= 2017–18 North Carolina Tar Heels men's basketball team =

American college basketball season

2017–18 North Carolina Tar Heels men's basketball

NCAA tournament, Second Round
- Conference: Atlantic Coast Conference

Ranking
- Coaches: No. 14
- AP: No. 10
- Record: 26–11 (11–7 ACC)
- Head coach: Roy Williams (15th season)
- Assistant coaches: Steve Robinson (15th season); Hubert Davis (6th season); Brad Frederick (1st season)
- Home arena: Dean E. Smith Center

2017–18 ACC men's basketball standings
	Conf.				Overall
Team	W		L	PCT	W		L	PCT
No. 1 Virginia †	17	–	1	.944	31	–	3	.912
No. 9 Duke	13	–	5	.722	29	–	8	.784
No. 22 Miami (FL)	11	–	7	.611	22	–	10	.688
No. 20 Clemson	11	–	7	.611	25	–	10	.714
NC State	11	–	7	.611	21	–	12	.636
No. 10 North Carolina	11	–	7	.611	26	–	11	.703
Virginia Tech	10	–	8	.556	21	–	12	.636
Florida State	9	–	9	.500	23	–	12	.657
Louisville	9	–	9	.500	22	–	14	.611
Notre Dame	8	–	10	.444	21	–	15	.583
Syracuse	8	–	10	.444	23	–	14	.622
Boston College	7	–	11	.389	19	–	16	.543
Georgia Tech	6	–	12	.333	13	–	19	.406
Wake Forest	4	–	14	.222	11	–	20	.355
Pittsburgh	0	–	18	.000	8	–	24	.250
† 2018 ACC tournament winner Rankings from AP poll

The 2017–18 North Carolina Tar Heels men's basketball team represented the University of North Carolina at Chapel Hill during the 2017–18 NCAA Division I men's basketball season. The team's head coach was Roy Williams, who was in his 15th season as UNC's head men's basketball coach. The Tar Heels played their home games at the Dean Smith Center in Chapel Hill, North Carolina as members of the Atlantic Coast Conference. They finished the season 26–11, 11–7 in ACC play to finish in a four-way tie for fourth place. As the No. 6 seed in the ACC tournament, they defeated Syracuse, Miami, and Duke before losing to Virginia in the championship game. They received an at-large bid to the NCAA tournament as the No. 2 seed in the West region where they defeated Lipscomb before losing to Texas A&M in the Second Round.

== Previous season ==
The Tar Heels finished the 2016–17 season with a record of 33–7, 14–4 in ACC play to finish in first place, winning their 31st ACC regular season title. After beating Miami in the ACC tournament, they lost to Duke in the semifinals. Despite the loss to Duke, the Tar Heels received an at-large bid to the NCAA tournament as a No. 1 seed in the South region. There they defeated No. 16 Texas Southern, No. 8 Arkansas, No. 4 Butler, and No. 2 Kentucky to earn a trip to their 20th Final Four. In a matchup against the Midwest Region's No. 3 seed Oregon in the Final Four, the Tar Heels won 77–76 to advance to the National Championship. In the championship against the West Region's No. 1 seed Gonzaga, the Tar Heels won 71–65, winning the school's sixth national championship.

== Offseason ==
=== Departures ===
Name	Number	Pos.	Height	Weight	Year	Hometown	Notes
Nate Britt	0	G	6'1"	175	Senior	Upper Marlboro, Maryland	Graduated
Kennedy Meeks	3	F	6'10"	260	Senior	Charlotte, North Carolina	Graduated
Isaiah Hicks	4	F	6'9"	235	Senior	Oxford, North Carolina	Graduated
Kanler Coker	13	G	6'4"	200	Senior	Gainesville, Georgia	Graduated
Stilman White	30	G	6'1"	175	Senior	Wilmington, North Carolina	Graduated
Justin Jackson	44	F	6'8"	200	Junior	Tomball, Texas	Declared for 2017 NBA draft
Tony Bradley	5	C	6'11"	240	Freshman	Bartow, Florida	Declared for 2017 NBA draft

=== 2017 recruiting class ===
College recruiting information
Name	Hometown	School	Height	Weight	Commit date
Garrison Brooks; PF	Lafayette, AL	Auburn High School	6 ft 10 in (2.08 m)	230 lb (100 kg)	Apr 21, 2017
Garrison Brooks; PF	Recruit ratings: Scout: Rivals: 247Sports: ESPN: (N/A)				
Jalek Felton; SG	Mullins, SC	Gray Collegiate Academy	6 ft 3 in (1.91 m)	180 lb (82 kg)	Dec 30, 2014
Jalek Felton; SG	Recruit ratings: Scout: Rivals: 247Sports: ESPN: (N/A)				
Brandon Huffman; C	Anchorage, AK	Word of God Christian Academy	6 ft 9 in (2.06 m)	250 lb (110 kg)	Sep 26, 2016
Brandon Huffman; C	Recruit ratings: Scout: Rivals: 247Sports: ESPN: (N/A)				
Andrew Platek; SG	Guilderland, NY	Northfield Mount Hermon	6 ft 4 in (1.93 m)	180 lb (82 kg)	Jul 18, 2016
Andrew Platek; SG	Recruit ratings: Scout: Rivals: 247Sports: ESPN: (N/A)				
Sterling Manley; C	Pickerington, OH	Pickerington Central High School	6 ft 10 in (2.08 m)	220 lb (100 kg)	Oct 16, 2016
Sterling Manley; C	Recruit ratings: Scout: Rivals: 247Sports: ESPN: (N/A)				
Overall recruit ranking: Scout: #21 Rivals: #28 247Sports: #14 ESPN: #22
Note: In many cases, Scout, Rivals, 247Sports, On3, and ESPN may conflict in their listings of height and weight.; In these cases, the average was taken. ESPN grades are on a 100-point scale.; Sources:

=== Incoming transfers ===
Name	Pos.	Height	Weight	Year	Hometown	Notes
Cameron Johnson	F	6'8"	210	Junior	Moon Township, PA	Graduate Transfer from the University of Pittsburgh. Will play immediately in the 2017–18 season under NCAA transfer rules and has two seasons of eligibility remaining.

== Roster ==
2017–18 North Carolina Tar Heels men's basketball team
Players
Coaches

Pos.	#	Name	Height	Weight	Year	Previous school	Hometown
G	0	Seventh Woods	6 ft 1 in (1.85 m)	185 lb (84 kg)	So	Hammond School	Columbia, South Carolina
G/F	1	Theo Pinson	6 ft 6 in (1.98 m)	205 lb (93 kg)	Sr	Wesleyan Christian Academy	Greensboro, North Carolina
G	2	Joel Berry II	6 ft 0 in (1.83 m)	195 lb (88 kg)	Sr	Lake Highland Prep	Apopka, Florida
G	3	Andrew Platek	6 ft 3 in (1.91 m)	195 lb (88 kg)	Fr	Northfield Mount Hermon	Schenectady, New York
G	4	Brandon Robinson	6 ft 5 in (1.96 m)	170 lb (77 kg)	So	Douglas County High School	Douglasville, Georgia
G	5	Jalek Felton (S)	6 ft 3 in (1.91 m)	190 lb (86 kg)	Fr	Gray Collegiate Academy	West Columbia, South Carolina
F	11	Shea Rush	6 ft 6 in (1.98 m)	185 lb (84 kg)	So	The Barstow School	Kansas City, Missouri
G	13	Cameron Johnson	6 ft 8 in (2.03 m)	210 lb (95 kg)	RS Jr	Our Lady of the Sacred Heart/Pittsburgh	Moon Township, Pennsylvania
G	14	Kane Ma (W)	6 ft 0 in (1.83 m)	175 lb (79 kg)	Sr	New Garden Friends School	Greensboro, North Carolina
F	15	Garrison Brooks	6 ft 9 in (2.06 m)	215 lb (98 kg)	Fr	Auburn High School	Lafayette, Alabama
C	21	Sterling Manley	6 ft 11 in (2.11 m)	240 lb (109 kg)	Fr	Pickerington Central High School	Reynoldsburg, Ohio
F	22	Walker Miller (W)	6 ft 10 in (2.08 m)	220 lb (100 kg)	Fr	New Hampton School	Greensboro, North Carolina
G	24	Kenny Williams	6 ft 4 in (1.93 m)	175 lb (79 kg)	Jr	L.C. Bird	Midlothian, Virginia
F	25	Aaron Rohlman (W)	6 ft 6 in (1.98 m)	210 lb (95 kg)	Sr	Hunter Huss	Gastonia, North Carolina
G	30	K. J. Smith (W) (redshirt)	6 ft 2 in (1.88 m)	180 lb (82 kg)	So	IMG Academy	Thousand Oaks, California
F	32	Luke Maye	6 ft 7 in (2.01 m)	230 lb (104 kg)	Jr	Hough	Huntersville, North Carolina
C	42	Brandon Huffman	6 ft 10 in (2.08 m)	250 lb (113 kg)	Fr	Word of God Christian Academy	Goldsboro, North Carolina

Head coach

- Roy Williams (North Carolina)

Assistant coach(es)

- Steve Robinson (Radford)
- Hubert Davis (North Carolina)
- Brad Frederick (North Carolina)

Legend

- (C) Team captain
- (S) Suspended
- (I) Ineligible
- (W) Walk-on
- Injured
- Current redshirt

Roster

== Schedule and results ==
Date time, TV	Rank^{#}	Opponent^{#}	Result	Record	High points	High rebounds	High assists	Site (attendance) city, state
Exhibition
Oct 27, 2017*; 7:30 pm, ACCN Extra		Barton	W 91–80	–	18 – Maye	11 – Maye	7 – Felton	Dean Smith Center (10,047); Chapel Hill, NC
Non-conference regular season
Nov 10, 2017*; 7:00 pm, ESPNU	No. 9	Northern Iowa	W 86–69	1–0	26 – Maye	10 – Maye	5 – Pinson	Dean Smith Center (18,926); Chapel Hill, NC
Nov 15, 2017*; 8:00 pm, ACCN Extra	No. 9	Bucknell; PK-80–Phil Knight Invitational Opening Round	W 93–81	2–0	20 – Maye	13 – Manley	6 – Tied	Dean Smith Center (13,941); Chapel Hill, NC
Nov 20, 2017*; 11:30 pm, ESPN2	No. 9	at Stanford	W 96–72	3–0	29 – Berry II	9 – Maye	5 – Maye	Maples Pavilion (7,233); Stanford, CA
Nov 23, 2017*; 2:30 pm, ESPN	No. 9	vs. Portland; PK-80–Phil Knight Invitational Victory quarterfinals	W 102–78	4–0	20 – Maye	10 – Maye	7 – Pinson	Moda Center (14,053); Portland, OR
Nov 24, 2017*; 3:30 pm, ESPN	No. 9	vs. Arkansas; PK-80–Phil Knight Invitational Victory semifinals	W 87–68	5–0	28 – Maye	16 – Maye	5 – Maye	Veterans Memorial Coliseum (10,978); Portland, OR
Nov 26, 2017*; 8:30 pm, ESPN	No. 9	vs. No. 4 Michigan State; PK-80–Phil Knight Invitational Victory championship	L 45–63	5–1	16 – Pinson	6 – Tied	3 – Berry II	Moda Center (19,413); Portland, OR
Nov 29, 2017*; 7:30 pm, ESPN	No. 13	Michigan; ACC–Big Ten Challenge	W 86–71	6–1	27 – Maye	7 – Pinson	6 – Pinson	Dean Smith Center (19,036); Chapel Hill, NC
Dec 1, 2017*; 8:00 pm, ESPN2	No. 13	vs. Davidson; Charlotte Showcase	W 85–75	7–1	27 – Berry II	17 – Maye	5 – Pinson	Spectrum Center (11,395); Charlotte, NC
Dec 3, 2017*; 2:00 pm, ESPN2	No. 13	Tulane	W 97–73	8–1	22 – Maye	10 – Maye	4 – Maye	Dean Smith Center (14,402); Chapel Hill, NC
Dec 6, 2017*; 7:00 pm, ESPN2	No. 11	Western Carolina	W 104–61	9–1	15 – Felton	12 – Maye	7 – Pinson	Dean Smith Center (12,720); Chapel Hill, NC
Dec 17, 2017*; 3:00 pm, ESPN	No. 7	at No. 20 Tennessee	W 78–73	10–1	21 – Berry II	9 – Pinson	8 – Pinson	Thompson–Boling Arena (21,678); Knoxville, TN
Dec 20, 2017*; 9:00 pm, ESPN2	No. 5	Wofford	L 75–79	10–2	23 – Berry II	14 – Maye	4 – Pinson	Dean Smith Center (16,017); Chapel Hill, NC
Dec 23, 2017*; 1:30 pm, CBS	No. 5	vs. Ohio State; CBS Sports Classic	W 86–72	11–2	19 – Tied	10 – Maye	5 – Felton	Smoothie King Center (8,119); New Orleans, LA
ACC Regular Season
Dec 30, 2017; 12:00 pm, ESPN2	No. 13	Wake Forest	W 73–69	12–2 (1–0)	17 – Maye	15 – Maye	6 – Pinson	Dean Smith Center (19,578); Chapel Hill, NC
Jan 3, 2018; 7:00 pm, ESPN2	No. 12	at No. 24 Florida State	L 80–81	12–3 (1–1)	28 – Berry II	7 – Williams	4 – Pinson	Donald L. Tucker Civic Center (8,931); Tallahassee, FL
Jan 6, 2018; 1:00 pm, ESPN	No. 12	at No. 8 Virginia	L 49–61	12–4 (1–2)	17 – Berry II	8 – Tied	3 – Williams	John Paul Jones Arena (14,401); Charlottesville, VA
Jan 9, 2018; 8:00 pm, ACCN	No. 20	Boston College	W 96–66	13–4 (2–2)	32 – Maye	18 – Maye	5 – Tied	Dean Smith Center (17,104); Chapel Hill, NC
Jan 13, 2018; 6:00 pm, ESPN	No. 20	at Notre Dame	W 69–68	14–4 (3–2)	18 – Maye	11 – Maye	4 – Pinson	Edmund P. Joyce Center (9,149); South Bend, IN
Jan 16, 2018; 7:00 pm, ACCRSN	No. 15	No. 20 Clemson	W 87–79	15–4 (4–2)	21 – Johnson	7 – Pinson	6 – Pinson	Dean Smith Center (20,155); Chapel Hill, NC
Jan 20, 2018; 2:00 pm, ESPN2	No. 15	Georgia Tech	W 80–66	16–4 (5–2)	17 – Maye	11 – Maye	5 – Williams	Dean Smith Center (20,334); Chapel Hill, NC
Jan 22, 2018; 7:00 pm, ESPN	No. 10	at Virginia Tech	L 69–80	16–5 (5–3)	23 – Tied	9 – Maye	8 – Pinson	Cassell Coliseum (9,275); Blacksburg, VA
Jan 27, 2018; 12:00 pm, CBS	No. 10	NC State; Rivalry	L 91–95 ^{OT}	16–6 (5–4)	31 – Maye	15 – Pinson	6 – Johnson	Dean Smith Center (21,750); Chapel Hill, NC
Jan 30, 2018; 7:00 pm, ESPN	No. 19	at No. 20 Clemson	L 78–82	16–7 (5–5)	32 – Johnson	9 – Maye	4 – Berry II	Littlejohn Coliseum (9,000); Clemson, SC
Feb 3, 2018; 8:00 pm, ACCN	No. 19	Pittsburgh	W 96–65	17–7 (6–5)	26 – Maye	13 – Pinson	8 – Pinson	Dean Smith Center (20,381); Chapel Hill, NC
Feb 8, 2018; 8:00 pm, ESPN/ACCN	No. 21	No. 9 Duke; Rivalry/ESPN College GameDay	W 82–78	18–7 (7–5)	21 – Berry II	13 – Johnson	6 – Berry II	Dean Smith Center (21,750); Chapel Hill, NC
Feb 10, 2018; 2:00 pm, ACCN	No. 21	at NC State; Rivalry	W 96–89	19–7 (8–5)	33 – Maye	17 – Maye	7 – Pinson	PNC Arena (19,500); Raleigh, NC
Feb 12, 2018; 7:00 pm, ESPN	No. 14	Notre Dame	W 83–66	20–7 (9–5)	21 – Berry II	10 – Pinson	5 – Pinson	Dean Smith Center (19,336); Chapel Hill, NC
Feb 17, 2018; 8:00 pm, ESPN	No. 14	at Louisville	W 93–76	21–7 (10–5)	23 – Berry II	13 – Maye	5 – Tied	KFC Yum! Center (21,210); Louisville, KY
Feb 21, 2018; 7:00 pm, ESPN	No. 10	at Syracuse	W 78–74	22–7 (11–5)	23 – Pinson	8 – Williams	7 – Pinson	Carrier Dome (27,165); Syracuse, NY
Feb 27, 2018; 9:00 pm, ESPN	No. 9	Miami (FL)	L 88–91	22–8 (11–6)	31 – Berry II	10 – Maye	11 – Pinson	Dean Smith Center (20,251); Chapel Hill, NC
Mar 3, 2018; 8:15 pm, ESPN	No. 9	at No. 5 Duke; Rivalry/ESPN College GameDay	L 64–74	22–9 (11–7)	16 – Johnson	8 – Williams	5 – Berry II	Cameron Indoor Stadium (9,314); Durham, NC
ACC Tournament
Mar 7, 2018; 9:30 pm, ESPN2	(6) No. 12	vs. (11) Syracuse; Second Round	W 78–59	23–9	17 – Williams	11 – Pinson	6 – Pinson	Barclays Center (17,732); Brooklyn, NY
Mar 8, 2018; 9:30 pm, ESPN2	(6) No. 12	vs. (3) No. 24 Miami (FL); Quarterfinals	W 82–65	24–9	25 – Pinson	13 – Maye	5 – Johnson	Barclays Center (17,732); Brooklyn, NY
Mar 9, 2018; 9:30 pm, ESPN	(6) No. 12	vs. (2) No. 5 Duke; Semifinals/Rivalry	W 74–69	25–9	17 – Maye	10 – Maye	7 – Pinson	Barclays Center (18,157); Brooklyn, NY
Mar 10, 2018; 8:30 pm, ESPN	(6) No. 12	vs. (1) No. 1 Virginia; Championship	L 63–71	25–10	20 – Maye	8 – Pinson	6 – Pinson	Barclays Center (18,157); Brooklyn, NY
NCAA tournament
Mar 16, 2018*; 2:45 pm, CBS	(2 W) No. 10	vs. (15 W) Lipscomb; First Round	W 84–66	26–10	18 – Williams	10 – Tied	7 – Pinson	Spectrum Center (18,489); Charlotte, NC
Mar 18, 2018*; 5:15 pm, CBS	(2 W) No. 10	vs. (7 W) Texas A&M; Second Round	L 65–86	26–11	21 – Berry II	11 – Maye	11 – Pinson	Spectrum Center (18,485); Charlotte, NC
*Non-conference game. ^{#}Rankings from AP Poll. (#) Tournament seedings in parentheses. W=West. All times are in Eastern Time.

== Rankings ==
Ranking movements Legend: ██ Increase in ranking ██ Decrease in ranking
	Week																				
Poll	Pre	1	2	3	4	5	6	7	8	9	10	11	12	13	14	15	16	17	18	19	Final
AP	9	9	9	9	13	11	7	5	13	12	20	15	10	19	21	14	10	9	12	10	Not released
Coaches	9	9	9	9	11	10	7	4	14	11	18	14	10	17	22	16	10	9	11	9	14

*AP does not release post-NCAA Tournament rankings
