= 2017–18 Atlantic Coast Conference men's basketball season =

- League: NCAA Division I
- Sport: Basketball
- Teams: 15
- TV partner(s): ACCN, ESPN, Raycom Sports, Regional Sports Networks, CBS

2017–18 NCAA Division I men's basketball season
- First place: Virginia
- Runners-up: Duke
- Season MVP: Marvin Bagley III – Duke
- Top scorer: Marvin Bagley III – Duke

ACC tournament
- Champions: Virginia
- Finals MVP: Kyle Guy – Virginia

Atlantic Coast Conference men's basketball seasons
- ← 2016–17 2018–19 →

2017–18 ACC men's basketball standings
| | Conf. | | | | Overall |
| Team | W | | L | PCT | W | | L | PCT |
|---|---|---|---|---|---|---|---|---|
| No. 1 Virginia † | 17 | – | 1 | .944 | 31 | – | 3 | .912 |
| No. 9 Duke | 13 | – | 5 | .722 | 29 | – | 8 | .784 |
| No. 22 Miami (FL) | 11 | – | 7 | .611 | 22 | – | 10 | .688 |
| No. 20 Clemson | 11 | – | 7 | .611 | 25 | – | 10 | .714 |
| NC State | 11 | – | 7 | .611 | 21 | – | 12 | .636 |
| No. 10 North Carolina | 11 | – | 7 | .611 | 26 | – | 11 | .703 |
| Virginia Tech | 10 | – | 8 | .556 | 21 | – | 12 | .636 |
| Florida State | 9 | – | 9 | .500 | 23 | – | 12 | .657 |
| Louisville | 9 | – | 9 | .500 | 22 | – | 14 | .611 |
| Notre Dame | 8 | – | 10 | .444 | 21 | – | 15 | .583 |
| Syracuse | 8 | – | 10 | .444 | 23 | – | 14 | .622 |
| Boston College | 7 | – | 11 | .389 | 19 | – | 16 | .543 |
| Georgia Tech | 6 | – | 12 | .333 | 13 | – | 19 | .406 |
| Wake Forest | 4 | – | 14 | .222 | 11 | – | 20 | .355 |
| Pittsburgh | 0 | – | 18 | .000 | 8 | – | 24 | .250 |
† 2018 ACC tournament winner Rankings from AP poll

The 2017–18 Atlantic Coast Conference men's basketball season began with practices in October 2017, followed by the start of the 2017–18 NCAA Division I men's basketball season in November. Conference play started in late December 2017 and concluded in March with the 2018 ACC men's basketball tournament at the Barclays Center in Brooklyn, New York. The Virginia Cavaliers won an outright regular season championship, their third in five years under the guidance of Tony Bennett, who also received his third ACC Coach of the Year Award. He also became the only living three-time winner of the Henry Iba Award for national coach of the year.

The Cavaliers finished 17–1 in the conference, finishing four games above second-place Duke. Virginia went on to win the tournament by handily defeating Louisville 75–58, Clemson 64–58, and North Carolina 71–63 in the championship game. Sophomore guard Kyle Guy was named Tournament MVP as well as First-Team All-ACC. Both the Virginia–North Carolina title game and Duke–North Carolina semifinal game set the Barclays Center attendance record for college basketball games, and conference leadership vowed to return the ACC tournament to New York again in the near future.

== Head coaches ==
=== Coaching changes ===
On February 16, 2017, NC State head coach Mark Gottfried was fired, but the school allowed him to finish out the season. He finished at NC State with a six-year record of 123–86. On March 17, the school hired UNC Wilmington head coach Kevin Keatts as head coach.

On September 26, 2017, federal prosecutors in New York announced that Louisville was under investigation for an alleged "pay for play" scheme involving recruits. The allegations state that an Adidas executive conspired to pay $100,000 to the family of a top-ranked national recruit to play at Louisville and to represent Adidas when he turned pro. The criminal complaint does not name Louisville specifically but appears to involve the recruitment of Brian Bowen, a late, surprise commit to the school. On September 27, head coach Rick Pitino and athletic director Tom Jurich were placed on administrative leave.

=== Coaches ===
| Team | Head coach | Previous job | Years at school | Record at school | ACC record | ACC titles | NCAA tournaments | NCAA Final Fours | NCAA Championships |
|---|---|---|---|---|---|---|---|---|---|
| Boston College | Jim Christian | Ohio | 4 | 29–67 | 6–48 | 0 | 2 | 0 | 0 |
| Clemson | Brad Brownell | Wright State | 8 | 124–103 | 56–66 | 0 | 5 | 0 | 0 |
| Duke | Mike Krzyzewski | Army | 38 | 998–271 | 399–166 | 15 | 33 | 12 | 5 |
| Florida State | Leonard Hamilton | Washington Wizards | 16 | 304–195 | 126–124 | 1 | 8 | 0 | 0 |
| Georgia Tech | Josh Pastner | Memphis | 2 | 21–16 | 8–10 | 0 | 4 | 0 | 0 |
| Louisville | David Padgett (Interim) | Louisville (Assistant) | 3 | 0–0 | 0–0 | 0 | 0 | 0 | 0 |
| Miami | Jim Larrañaga | George Mason | 7 | 139–69 | 64–42 | 1 | 8 | 1 | 0 |
| NC State | Kevin Keatts | UNC Wilmington | 1 | 0–0 | 0–0 | 0 | 2 | 0 | 0 |
| North Carolina | Roy Williams | Kansas | 15 | 398–115 | 169–65 | 3 | 28 | 8 | 3 |
| Notre Dame | Mike Brey | Delaware | 18 | 382–187 | 179–113 | 1 | 14 | 0 | 0 |
| Pittsburgh | Kevin Stallings | Vanderbilt | 2 | 16–17 | 4–14 | 0 | 9 | 0 | 0 |
| Syracuse | Jim Boeheim | Syracuse (Assistant) | 41 | 903–354 | 42–27 | 0 | 29 | 4 | 1 |
| Virginia | Tony Bennett | Washington State | 9 | 188–83 | 88–50 | 1 | 7 | 0 | 0 |
| Virginia Tech | Buzz Williams | Marquette | 4 | 53–48 | 22–32 | 0 | 6 | 0 | 0 |
| Wake Forest | Danny Manning | Tulsa | 4 | 43–52 | 16–38 | 0 | 2 | 0 | 0 |

Notes:

- Year at school includes 2017–18 season.
- Overall and ACC records are from time at current school and are through the end the 2016–17 season.
- NCAA tournament appearances are from time at current school only.
- NCAA Final Fours and Championship include time at other schools

== Preseason ==
ACC recruits at the 2017 McDonald's All-American Boys Game

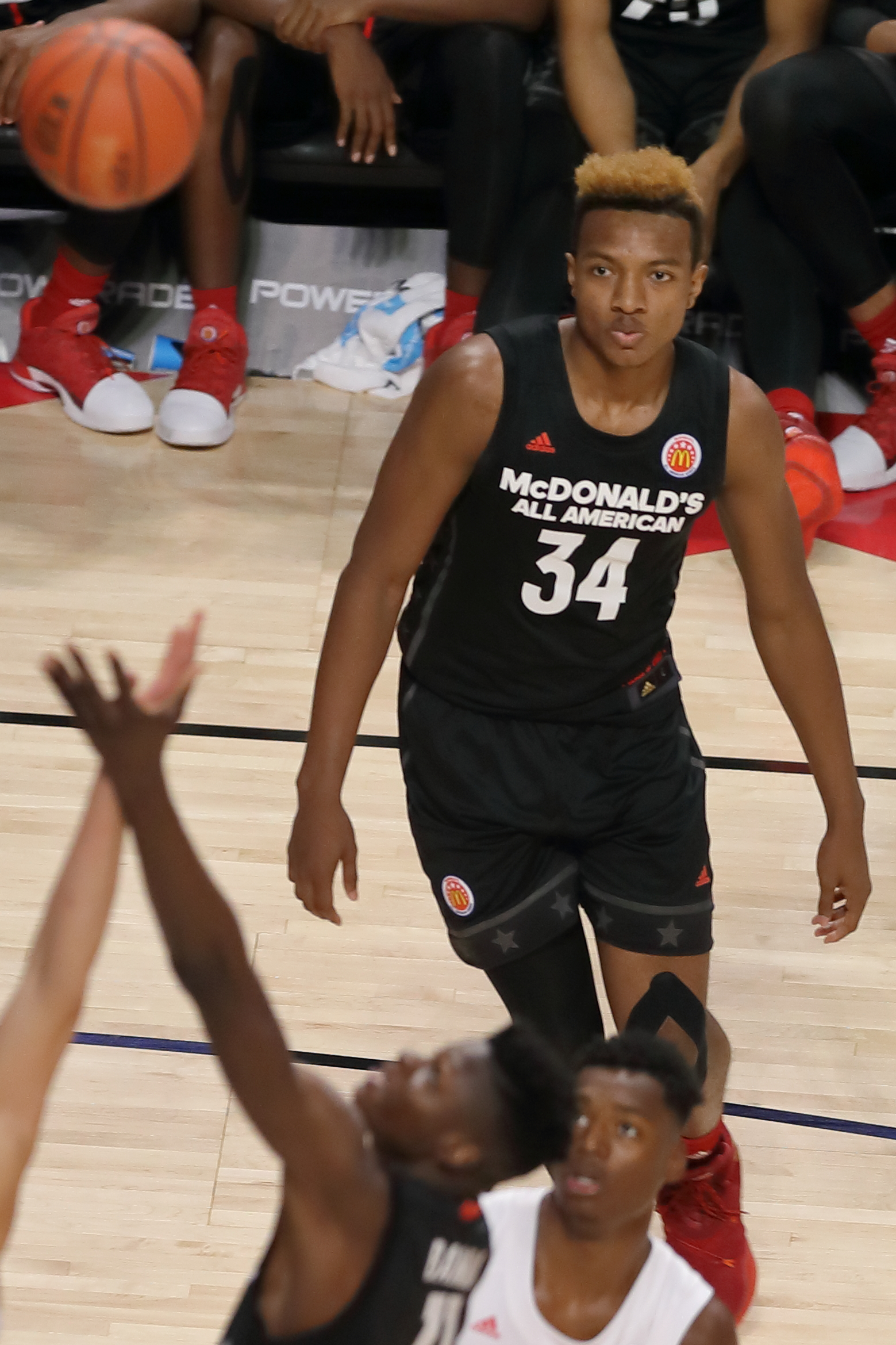
Wendell Carter Jr., Duke

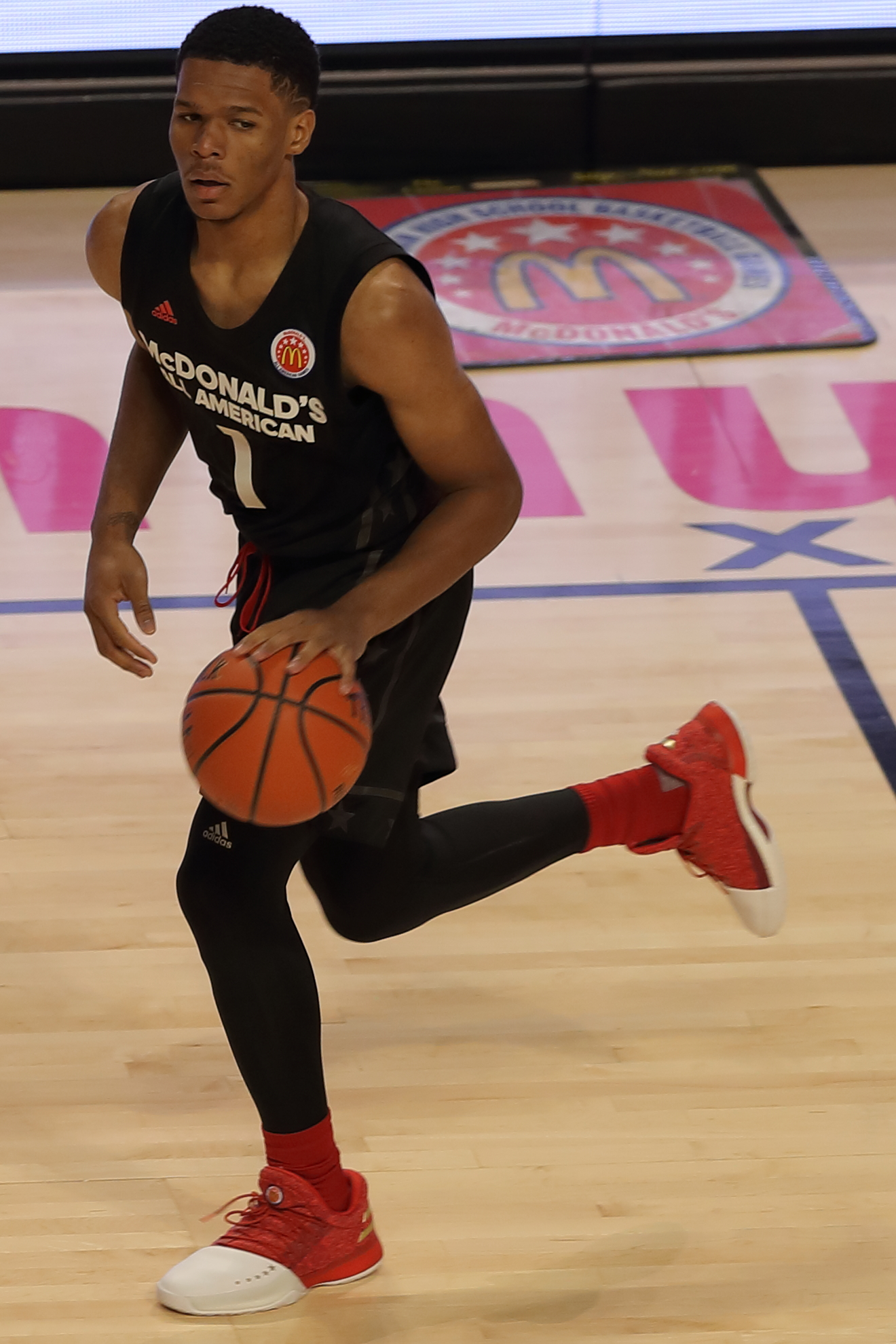
Trevon Duval, Duke

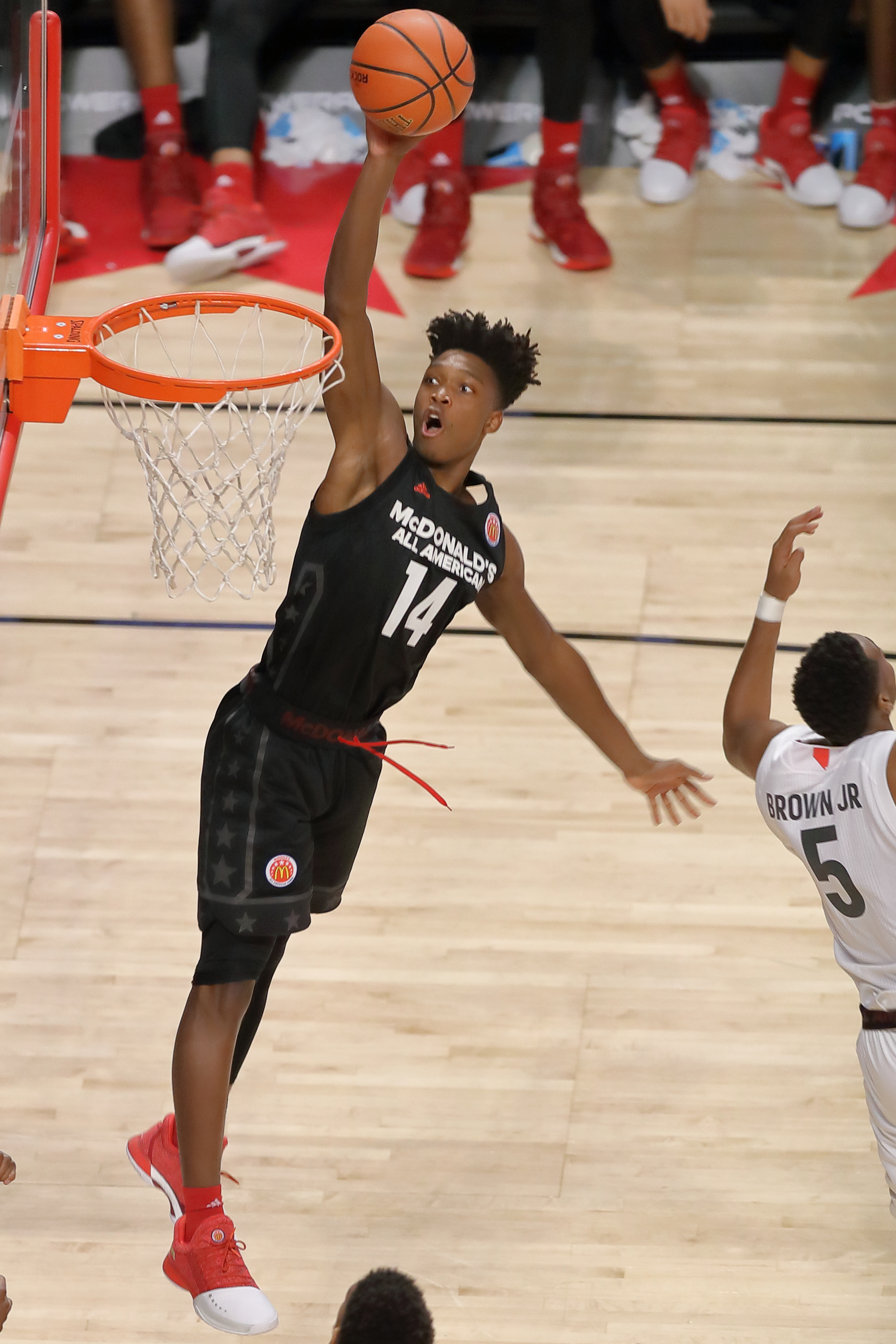
Lonnie Walker, Miami

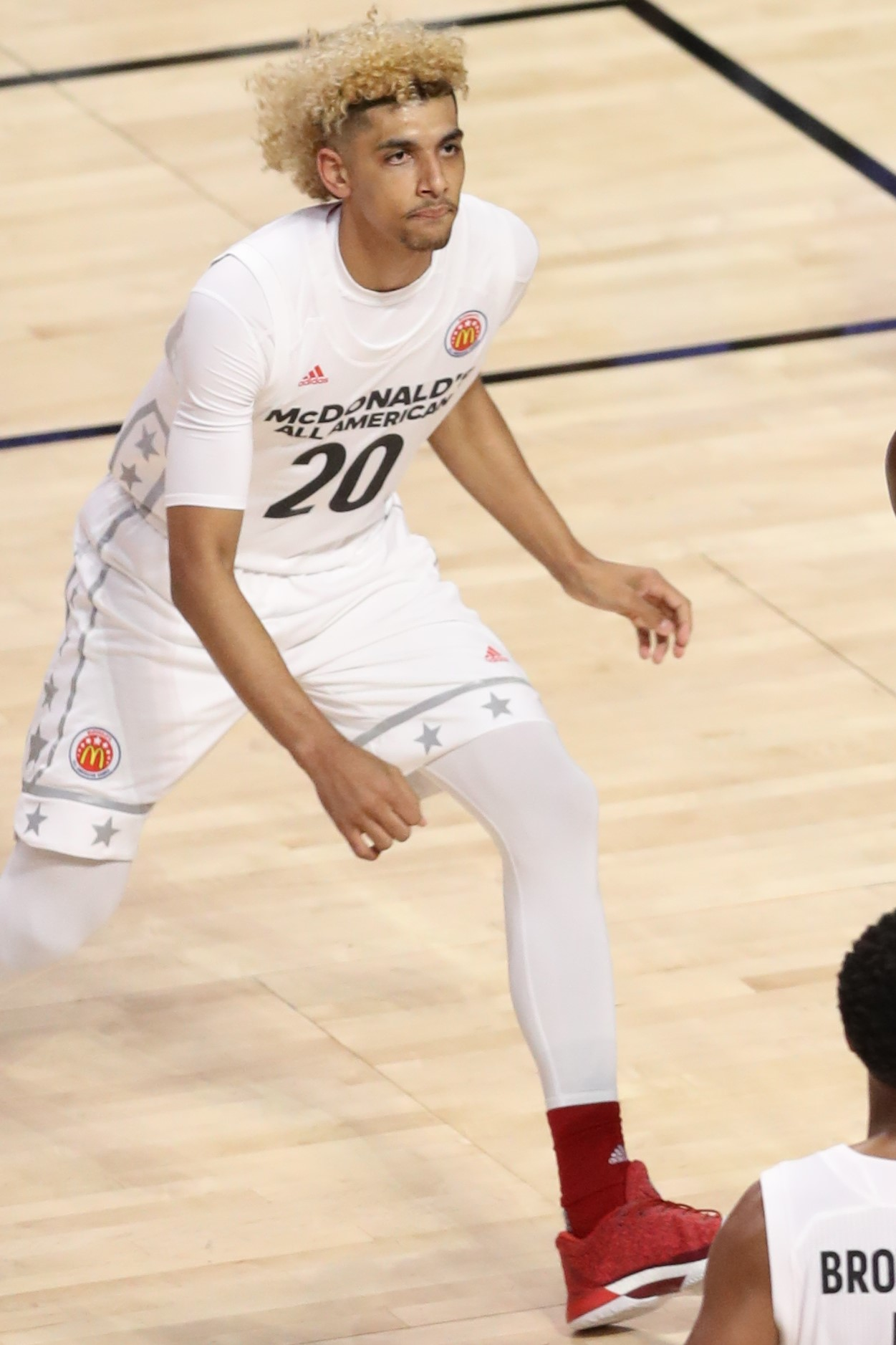
Brian Bowen, Louisville

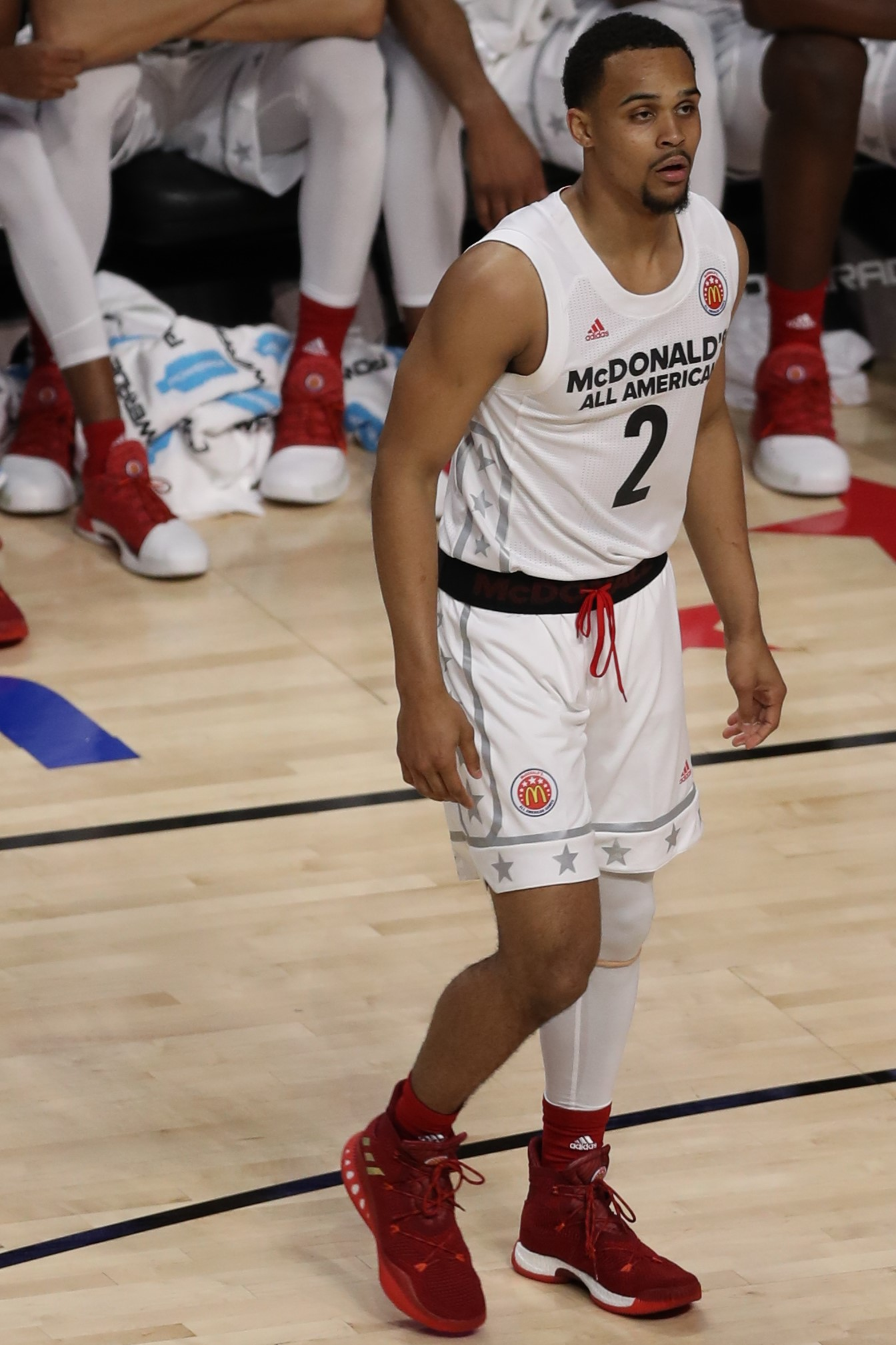
Gary Trent Jr., Duke

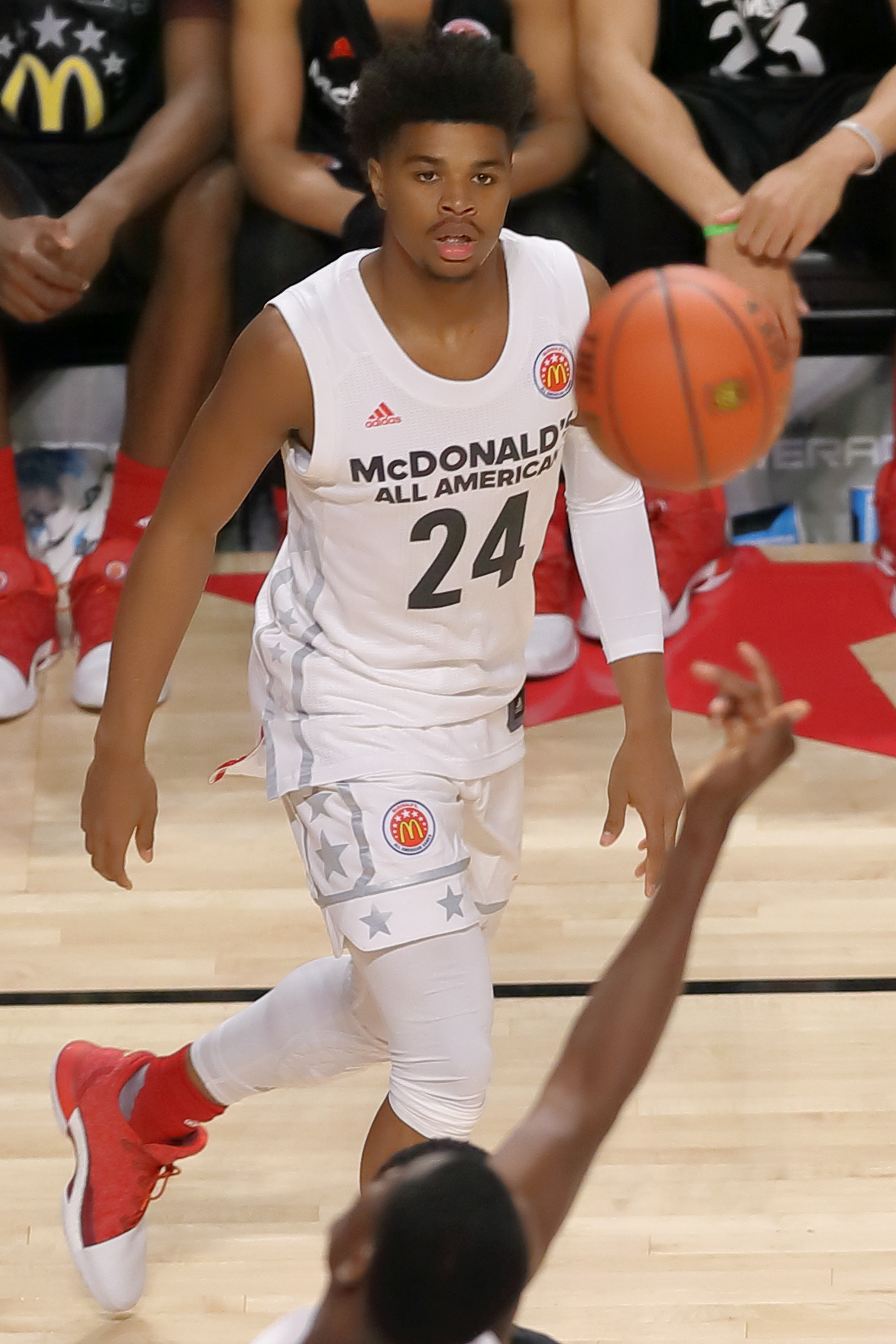
M. J. Walker, Florida State

=== Preseason watchlists ===
Below is a table of notable preseason watch lists.

| Wooden | Naismith | Robertson | Cousy | West | Erving | Malone | Abdul-Jabbar | Olson |
| Deng Adel – Louisville; Grayson Allen – Duke; Marvin Bagley III – Duke; Joel Berry II – North Carolina; Bruce Brown – Miami; Bonzie Colson – Notre Dame; Trevon Duval – Duke; Matt Farrell – Notre Dame; Ben Lammers – Georgia Tech | Deng Adel – Louisville; Grayson Allen – Duke; Marvin Bagley III – Duke; Joel Berry II – North Carolina; Bruce Brown – Miami; Wendell Carter Jr. – Duke; Bonzie Colson – Notre Dame; Trevon Duval – Duke; Matt Farrell – Notre Dame | Den Adel – Louisville; Grayson Allen – Duke; Marvin Bagley III – Duke; Joel Berry II – North Carolina; Bruce Brown Jr. – Miami; Wendell Carter Jr. – Duke; Bonzie Colson – Notre Dame; Trevon Duval – Duke | Trevon Duval – Duke; Quentin Snider – Louisville; Joel Berry II – North Carolina; Matt Farrell – Notre Dame; Bryant Crawford – Wake Forest | Jerome Robinson – Boston College; Grayson Allen – Duke; MJ Walker – Florida State; Lonnie Walker – Miami; Tyus Battle – Syracuse | Gary Trent Jr. – Duke; Deng Adel – Louisville; Bruce Brown Jr. – Miami | Marvin Bagley III – Duke; Wendell Carter Jr. – Duke; Bonzie Colson – Notre Dame | Marques Bolden – Duke; Ben Lammers – Georgia Tech; Omer Yurtseven – NC State | Deng Adel – Louisville; Grayson Allen – Duke; Joel Berry II – North Carolina; Bruce Brown Jr – Miami; Bonzie Colson – Notre Dame; Ben Lammers – Georgia Tech |

=== Preseason polls ===
| | AP | Athlon; Sports | Bleacher; Report | Blue Ribbon; Yearbook | CBS Sports | Coaches | ESPN | KenPom | NBC Sports | SBNation | Sports; Illustrated |
| Boston College | | | | | | | | 95 | | | |
| Clemson | | | | | | | | 47 | | | |
| Duke | 1 | 4 | 1 | 3 | 1 | 1 | 1 | 6 | 2 | 1 | 3 |
| Florida State | | | | | | | | 55 | | | |
| Georgia Tech | | | | | | | | 44 | | | |
| Louisville | 16 | 7 | 23 | 6 | 18 | 16 | 17 | 16 | 12 | 13 | 9 |
| Miami | 13 | 15 | 13 | 16 | 10 | 12 | 11 | 27 | 11 | 7 | 12 |
| North Carolina | 9 | 9 | 12 | 10 | 11 | 9 | 16 | 13 | 17 | 11 | 18 |
| NC State | | | | | | | | 109 | | | |
| Notre Dame | 14 | 18 | 14 | 19 | 12 | 14 | 20 | 22 | 14 | 19 | 15 |
| Pittsburgh | | | | | | | | 121 | | | |
| Syracuse | | | | | | | | 68 | | | |
| Virginia | | | 16 | | | | | 9 | | | |
| Virginia Tech | | | | 25 | | | | 53 | | 23 | |
| Wake Forest | | | | | | | | 57 | | | |

=== ACC Preseason Media Poll ===
In the end of October, 2017 members of the media gathered in Charlotte to vote on the preseason ACC awards. Conference finish, Preseason ACC teams, rookie of the year, and player of the year were all voted on. The results can be seen in the sections below.

==== Preseason poll ====
First place votes shown in parentheses.

1. Duke (57) – 1020
2. North Carolina (7) – 921
3. Notre Dame (4) – 852
4. Miami (1) – 809
5. Louisville – 733
6. Virginia – 690
7. Virginia Tech – 549
8. Florida State – 519
9. Georgia Tech – 468
10. Syracuse – 420
11. Wake Forest – 378
12. NC State – 310
13. Clemson – 289
14. Boston College – 181
15. Pittsburgh – 141

==== Preseason All-ACC teams ====
2017 ACC Men's Basketball PreSeason All-ACC Teams
| First Team | Second Team |
| Bonzie Colson, Notre Dame (64); Grayson Allen, Duke (60); Joel Berry II, North Carolina (58); Marvin Bagley III, Duke (26); Ben Lammers, Georgia Tech (25) | Bruce Brown Jr., Miami (22); Quentin Snider, Louisville (12); Deng Adel, Louisville (12); Josh Okogie, Georgia Tech (11); Jerome Robinson, Boston College (11) |

==== ACC Preseason Player of the year ====
- Bonzie Colson, Notre Dame (49)
- Grayson Allen, Duke (9)
- Joel Berry II, North Carolina (9)
- Bruce Brown Jr., Miami (1)
- Jerome Robinson, Boston College (1)

==== ACC Preseason Rookie of the year ====
- Marvin Bagley III, Duke (58)
- Lonnie Walker, Miami (3)
- Lavar Batts Jr., NC State (2)
- M. J. Walker, Florida State (2)
- Jalek Felton, North Carolina (1)
- Aamir Simms, Clemson (1)
- Oshae Brissett, Syracuse (1)
- De’Andre Hunter, Virginia (1)

== Regular season ==
=== Rankings ===
Legend
| Increase in ranking |
| Decrease in ranking |
| Not ranked previous week |
| First Place votes shown in () |

| | | Pre | Wk 2 | Wk 3 | Wk 4 | Wk 5 | Wk 6 | Wk 7 | Wk 8 | Wk 9 | Wk 10 | Wk 11 | Wk 12 | Wk 13 | Wk 14 | Wk 15 | Wk 16 | Wk 17 | Wk 18 | Final |
|---|---|---|---|---|---|---|---|---|---|---|---|---|---|---|---|---|---|---|---|---|
| Boston College | AP | | | | | | | | | | | | | | | | | | | |
| Boston College | C | | | | | | | | | | | | | | | | | | | |
| Clemson | AP | | | | | | | RV | RV | 25 | 19 | 20 | 18 | 20 | 16 | 11 | 15 | 18 | 19 | 20 |
| Clemson | C | | | | | | RV | RV | 25 | 17 | 18 | 17 | 20 | 15 | 12 | 17 | 18 | 20 | 18 | 15 |
| Duke | AP | 1 (33) | 1 (34) | 1 (54) | 1 (65) | 1 (65) | 4 | 4 | 4 | 2 (21) | 7 | 5 | 4 | 4 | 9 | 12 | 5 | 5 | 5 | 9 |
| Duke | C | 1 (20) | 1 (29) | 1 (30) | 1 (30) | 4 | 3 | 3 | 2 (4) | 6 | 5 | 4 | 5 | 8 | 10 | 5 | 3 | 4 | 6 | 4 |
| Florida State | AP | | | | | | 19 | 24 | 24 | 24 | 23 | RV | RV | RV | RV | RV | 25 | RV | RV | |
| Florida State | C | RV | | RV | RV | 19 | 25 | 25 | RV | RV | RV | RV | RV | RV | | RV | RV | RV | RV | 18 |
| Georgia Tech | AP | | | | | | | | | | | | | | | | | | | |
| Georgia Tech | C | RV | | | | | | | | | | | | | | | | | | |
| Louisville | AP | 16 | 18 | 19 | 17 | RV | RV | RV | RV | | | RV | RV | RV | | RV | | | | |
| Louisville | C | 16 | 18 | 17 | RV | RV | RV | RV | RV | | RV | RV | RV | RV | RV | | | | | |
| Miami | AP | 13 | 11 | 11 | 10 | 10 | 6 | 6 | 15 | 15 | 18 | 25 | RV | RV | 25 | RV | | | 24 | 22 |
| Miami | C | 12 | 11 | 13 | 11 | 8 | 7 | 16 | 17 | 19 | 23 | 24 | RV | 25 | RV | RV | RV | 25 | 25 | RV |
| North Carolina | AP | 9 | 9 | 9 | 13 | 11 | 7 | 5 | 13 | 12 | 20 | 15 | 10 | 19 | 21 | 14 | 10 | 9 | 12 | 10 |
| North Carolina | C | 9 | 9 | 11 | 10 | 7 | 4 | 14 | 11 | 18 | 14 | 10 | 17 | 22 | 16 | 10 | 9 | 11 | 9 | 14 |
| NC State | AP | | | | | | | | | RV | | | | | | | | RV | RV | |
| NC State | C | | | | | | | | | | | | | | | | RV | RV | RV | |
| Notre Dame | AP | 14 | 13 | 13 | 5 | 9 | 18 | RV | RV | RV | RV | | | | | | | | | |
| Notre Dame | C | 14 | 12 | 5 | 8 | 18 | RV | RV | RV | 25 | RV | | | | | | | | | |
| Pittsburgh | AP | | | | | | | | | | | | | | | | | | | |
| Pittsburgh | C | | | | | | | | | | | | | | | | | | | |
| Syracuse | AP | | | | | | RV | RV | | RV | | | | | | | | | | |
| Syracuse | C | | | RV | RV | RV | RV | RV | RV | | | | | | | | | | | |
| Virginia | AP | RV | RV | RV | 18 | 15 | 16 | 13 | 9 | 8 | 3 (1) | 2 (1) | 2 (1) | 2 (17) | 2 (16) | 1 (30) | 1 (42) | 1 (48) | 1 (65) | 1 (65) |
| Virginia | C | RV | 25 | 15 | 12 | 16 | 14 | 9 | 8 | 3 | 2 | 2 | 2 (8) | 2 (8) | 3 (5) | 2 (8) | 1 (17) | 1 (32) | 1 (32) | 5 |
| Virginia Tech | AP | RV | RV | | | RV | RV | RV | | | | | | | | RV | RV | RV | RV | RV |
| Virginia Tech | C | RV | RV | RV | RV | RV | RV | RV | RV | | | | | | RV | RV | RV | RV | RV | |
| Wake Forest | AP | | | | | | | | | | | | | | | | | | | |
| Wake Forest | C | | | | | | | | | | | | | | | | | | | |

Notes: The week 2 Coaches Poll did not release at the same time as the week 2 AP poll. The AP poll does not release a final poll after the NCAA tournament, where as the Coaches Poll does.

=== Conference matrix ===
This table summarizes the head-to-head results between teams in conference play. Each team will play 18 conference games, and at least 1 against each opponent.

| | Boston College | Clemson | Duke | Florida State | Georgia Tech | Louisville | Miami | North Carolina | NC State | Notre Dame | Pittsburgh | Syracuse | Virginia | Virginia Tech | Wake Forest |
|---|---|---|---|---|---|---|---|---|---|---|---|---|---|---|---|
| vs. Boston College | – | 1–0 | 0–1 | 1–1 | 0–1 | 1–0 | 1–1 | 1–0 | 1–0 | 2–0 | 0–1 | 1–1 | 1–0 | 1–0 | 0–1 |
| vs. Clemson | 0–1 | – | 1–0 | 1–1 | 0–2 | 0–1 | 0–1 | 1–1 | 1–1 | 0–1 | 0–1 | 1–0 | 1–0 | 1–0 | 0–1 |
| vs. Duke | 1–0 | 0–1 | – | 0–1 | 0–1 | 0–1 | 0–1 | 1–1 | 1–0 | 0–1 | 0–2 | 0–1 | 1–0 | 1–1 | 0–2 |
| vs. Florida State | 1–1 | 1–1 | 1–0 | – | 0–1 | 1–1 | 1–1 | 0–1 | 1–0 | 1–0 | 0–1 | 0–1 | 1–0 | 0–1 | 1–0 |
| vs. Georgia Tech | 1–0 | 2–0 | 1–0 | 1–0 | – | 1–0 | 0–1 | 1–0 | 0–1 | 1–1 | 0–1 | 0–1 | 2–0 | 1–0 | 1–1 |
| vs. Louisville | 0–1 | 1–0 | 1–0 | 1–1 | 0–1 | – | 1–0 | 1–0 | 1–0 | 0–1 | 0–2 | 1–0 | 2–0 | 0–2 | 0–1 |
| vs. Miami | 1–1 | 1–0 | 1–0 | 1–1 | 1–0 | 0–1 | – | 0–1 | 0–1 | 0–1 | 0–2 | 1–0 | 1–0 | 0–2 | 0–1 |
| vs. North Carolina | 0–1 | 1–1 | 1–1 | 1–0 | 0–1 | 0–1 | 1–0 | – | 1–1 | 0–2 | 0–1 | 0–1 | 1–0 | 1–0 | 0–1 |
| vs. NC State | 0–1 | 1–1 | 0–1 | 0–1 | 1–0 | 0–1 | 1–0 | 1–1 | – | 1–1 | 0–1 | 0–1 | 1–0 | 1–0 | 0–2 |
| vs. Notre Dame | 0–2 | 1–0 | 1–0 | 1–0 | 1–1 | 1–0 | 1–0 | 2–0 | 1–1 | – | 0–1 | 0–1 | 1–0 | 1–0 | 0–1 |
| vs. Pittsburgh | 1–0 | 1–0 | 2–0 | 1–0 | 1–0 | 2–0 | 2–0 | 1–0 | 1–0 | 1–0 | – | 2–0 | 1–0 | 1–0 | 1–0 |
| vs. Syracuse | 1–1 | 0–1 | 1–0 | 1–0 | 1–0 | 0–1 | 0–1 | 1–0 | 1–0 | 1–0 | 0–2 | – | 2–0 | 0–1 | 1–1 |
| vs. Virginia | 0–1 | 0–1 | 0–1 | 0–1 | 0–2 | 0–2 | 0–1 | 0–1 | 0–1 | 0–1 | 0–1 | 0–2 | – | 1–1 | 0–1 |
| vs. Virginia Tech | 0–1 | 0–1 | 1–1 | 1–0 | 0–1 | 2–0 | 2–0 | 0–1 | 0–1 | 0–1 | 0–1 | 1–0 | 1–1 | – | 0–1 |
| vs. Wake Forest | 1–0 | 1–0 | 2–0 | 0–1 | 1–1 | 1–0 | 1–0 | 1–0 | 2–0 | 1–0 | 0–1 | 1–1 | 1–0 | 1–0 | – |
| Total | 7–11 | 11–7 | 13–5 | 9–9 | 6–12 | 9–9 | 11–7 | 11–7 | 11–7 | 8–10 | 0–18 | 8–10 | 17–1 | 10–8 | 4–14 |

=== Player of the week ===
Throughout the conference regular season, the Atlantic Coast Conference offices named one or two Players of the week and one or two Rookies of the week.

| Week | Player of the week | Rookie of the week |
|---|---|---|
| November 13, 2017 | Marvin Bagley III, Duke | Marvin Bagley III, Duke |
| November 13, 2017 | Luke Maye, North Carolina | Marvin Bagley III, Duke |
| November 20, 2017 | Grayson Allen, Duke | Wendell Carter Jr., Duke |
| November 27, 2017 | Marvin Bagley III (2), Duke | Marvin Bagley III (2), Duke |
| December 4, 2017 | Luke Maye (2), North Carolina | Marvin Bagley III (3), Duke |
| December 11, 2017 | Ky Bowman, Boston College | Lonnie Walker, Miami |
| December 18, 2017 | Marcquise Reed, Clemson | Oshae Brissett, Syracuse |
| December 26, 2017 | Bonzie Colson, Notre Dame | Wendell Carter Jr. (2), Duke |
| January 2, 2018 | Ty Jerome, Virginia | Marvin Bagley III (4), Duke |
| January 8, 2018 | T. J. Gibbs, Notre Dame | Chris Lykes, Miami |
| January 15, 2018 | Luke Maye (3), North Carolina | Marvin Bagley III (5), Duke |
| January 22, 2018 | Gary Trent Jr., Duke | Gary Trent Jr., Duke |
| January 22, 2018 | Omer Yurtseven, NC State | Gary Trent Jr., Duke |
| January 29, 2018 | Allerik Freeman, NC State | Marvin Bagley III (6), Duke |
| January 29, 2018 | Allerik Freeman, NC State | Lonnie Walker (2), Miami |
| February 5, 2018 | Gabe DeVoe, Clemson | Gary Trent Jr. (2), Duke |
| February 5, 2018 | Gabe DeVoe, Clemson | Lonnie Walker (3), Miami |
| February 12, 2018 | Jerome Robinson, Boston College | Jordan Nwora, Louisville |
| February 19, 2018 | Grayson Allen (2), Duke | Oshae Brissett (2), Syracuse |
| February 19, 2018 | Grayson Allen (2), Duke | De'Andre Hunter, Virginia |
| February 26, 2018 | Allerik Freeman (2), NC State | Wendell Carter Jr. (3), Duke |
| March 5, 2018 | Bonzie Colson (2), Notre Dame | Marvin Bagley III (7), Duke |

=== Records against other conferences ===
2017–18 records against non-conference foes as of (Feb. 3, 2018). Records shown for regular season only.

| Power 7 Conferences | Record |
|---|---|
| American | 6–1 |
| Big East | 2–3 |
| Big Ten | 14–5 |
| Big 12 | 1–4 |
| Pac-12 | 3–1 |
| SEC | 9–5 |
| Power 7 Total | 35–19 |
| Other NCAA Division I Conferences | Record |
| America East | 2–0 |
| A-10 | 12–2 |
| ASUN | 3–0 |
| Big Sky | 1–1 |
| Big South | 7–1 |
| Big West | 2–0 |
| CAA | 4–0 |
| C-USA | 4–0 |
| Horizon League | 2–1 |
| Ivy League | 6–0 |
| MAAC | 4–0 |
| MAC | 4–1 |
| MEAC | 12–0 |
| MVC | 3–2 |
| Mountain West | 1–0 |
| NEC | 9–0 |
| OVC | 2–0 |
| Patriot League | 8–1 |
| Pacific West | 1–0 |
| SoCon | 9–3 |
| Southland | 3–0 |
| SWAC | 4–0 |
| The Summit | 2–0 |
| Sun Belt | 2–1 |
| WAC | 4–1 |
| WCC | 2–0 |
| Other Division I Total | 113–14 |
| NCAA Division I Total | 148–32 |

== Postseason ==
=== ACC tournament ===
- 2018 Atlantic Coast Conference Basketball Tournament, Barclays Center, Brooklyn.

First round Tuesday, March 7
12 | Boston College | 87
13 | Georgia Tech | 77
10 | Notre Dame | 67
15 | Pittsburgh | 64
11 | Syracuse | 73
14 | Wake Forest | 64

Second round Wednesday, March 8
8 | Florida State | 74
9 | Louisville | 82
5 | N.C. State | 87
12 | Boston College | 91
7 | Virginia Tech | 65
10 | Notre Dame | 71
6 | North Carolina | 78
11 | Syracuse | 59

Quarterfinals; Thursday, March 9
1 | Virginia | 75
9 | Louisville | 58
4 | Clemson | 90
12 | Boston College | 82
2 | Duke | 88
10 | Notre Dame | 70
3 | Miami | 65
6 | North Carolina | 82

Semifinals; Friday, March 10
1 | Virginia | 64
4 | Clemson | 58
2 | Duke | 69
6 | North Carolina | 74

Championship; Saturday, March 11
1 | Virginia | 71
6 | North Carolina | 63

* Denotes Overtime Game

AP Rankings at time of tournament

=== NCAA tournament ===
| Seed | Region | School | First Four | 1st round | 2nd round | Sweet 16 | Elite Eight | Final Four | Championship |
|---|---|---|---|---|---|---|---|---|---|
| 1 | South | Virginia | | L 54–74 vs. #16 UMBC – (Charlotte) | | | | | |
| 2 | West | North Carolina | | W 84–66 vs. #15 Lipscomb – (Charlotte) | L 65–86 vs. #7 Texas A&M – (Charlotte) | | | | |
| 2 | Midwest | Duke | | W 86–69 vs. #15 Iona – (Pittsburgh) | W 87–62 vs. #7 Rhode Island – (Pittsburgh) | W 69–65 vs. #11 Syracuse – (Omaha) | L 81–85 (OT) vs. #1 Kansas – (Omaha) | | |
| 5 | Midwest | Clemson | | W 79–68 vs. #12 New Mexico State – (San Diego) | W 84–53 vs. #4 Auburn – (San Diego) | L 76–80 vs. #1 Kansas – (Omaha) | | | |
| 6 | South | Miami | | L 62–64 vs. #11 Loyola–Chicago – (Dallas) | | | | | |
| 8 | East | Virginia Tech | | L 83–86 vs. #9 Alabama – (Pittsburgh) | | | | | |
| 9 | West | Florida State | | W 67–54 vs. #8 Missouri – (Nashville) | W 75–70 vs. #1 Xavier – (Nashville) | W 75–60 vs. #4 Gonzaga – (Los Angeles) | L 54–58 vs. #3 Michigan – (Los Angeles) | | |
| 9 | Midwest | NC State | | L 83–94 vs. #8 Seton Hall – (Wichita) | | | | | |
| 11 | Midwest | Syracuse | W 60–56 vs. #11 Arizona State – (Dayton) | W 57–52 vs. #6 TCU – (Detroit) | W 55–53 vs. #3 Michigan State – (Detroit) | L 65–69 vs. #2 Duke – (Omaha) | | | |
| | | W–L (%): | 1–0 (1.000) | 5–4 (.556) | 4–1 (.800) | 2–2 (.500) | 0–2 (.000) | 0–0 (–) | 0–0 (–) Total: 12–9 (.571) |

=== National Invitation tournament ===
| Seed | Bracket | School | 1st round | 2nd round | Quarterfinals | Semifinals | Championship |
|---|---|---|---|---|---|---|---|
| 1 | Notre Dame | Notre Dame | W 84–63 vs. #8 Hampton – (South Bend) | L 63–73 vs. #4 Penn State – (South Bend) | | | |
| 2 | Baylor | Louisville | W 66–58 vs. #7 Northern Kentucky – (Louisville) | W 84–68 vs. #3 Middle Tennessee – (Louisville) | L 56–79 vs. #4 Mississippi State – (Louisville) | | |
| 5 | USC | Boston College | L 62–79 vs. #4 Western Kentucky – (Bowling Green) | | | | |
| | | W–L (%): | 2–1 (.667) | 1–1 (.500) | 0–1 (.000) | 0–0 (–) | 0–0 (–) Total: 3–3 (.500) |

== Honors and awards ==
=== All-Americans ===
Consensus All-Americans
| First Team | Second Team |
|---|---|
| Marvin Bagley III – Duke | None |

To earn "consensus" status, a player must win honors based on a point system computed from the four different all-America teams. The point system consists of three points for first team, two points for second team and one point for third team. No honorable mention or fourth team or lower are used in the computation. The top five totals plus ties are first team and the next five plus ties are second team.

| Associated Press | NABC | Sporting News | USBWA |
First Team
| Marvin Bagley III – Duke | Marvin Bagley III – Duke | Marvin Bagley III – Duke | Marvin Bagley III – Duke |
Third Team
| Kyle Guy – Virginia; Luke Maye – North Carolina | Joel Berry II – North Carolina; Kyle Guy – Virginia | Luke Maye – North Carolina | |

=== ACC Awards ===
2017 ACC Men's Basketball Individual Awards
| Award | Recipient(s) |
| Player of the Year | Marvin Bagley III, F., Duke |
| Coach of the Year | Tony Bennett Virginia |
| Defensive Player of the Year | Isaiah Wilkins, F., Virginia |
| Freshman of the Year | Marvin Bagley III, F., Duke |
| Most Improved Player of the Year | Luke Maye, F., North Carolina |
| Sixth Man Award | De'Andre Hunter, F., Virginia |

2017 ACC Men's Basketball All-Conference Teams
| First Team | Second Team | Third Team |
| †Marvin Bagley III, Fr., F., Duke; Jerome Robinson, Jr., G., Boston College; Luke Maye, Jr., F., North Carolina; Joel Berry II, Sr., G., North Carolina; Kyle Guy, So., G., Virginia | Tyus Battle, So., G., Syracuse; Marcquise Reed, Jr., G., Clemson; Devon Hall, Sr., G., Virginia; Wendell Carter Jr., Fr., F., Duke; Justin Robinson, Jr., G., Virginia Tech | Grayson Allen, Sr., G., Duke; Matt Farrell, Sr., G., Notre Dame; Ty Jerome, So., G., Virginia; Josh Okogie, So., G., Georgia Tech; Omer Yurtseven, So., C., NC State |
† - denotes unanimous selection

== 2018 NBA draft ==
The Atlantic Coast Conference had a total of 10 players selected in the 2018 NBA Draft. Six players were selected in the first round, and 4 players were selected in the second round. The 10 selections was the most selections of any conference in the draft. The ACC is the only conference to have had at least four first round picks in each of the last 10 NBA Drafts, and has had at least one first round pick for 30 consecutive years.

| PG | Point guard | SG | Shooting guard | SF | Small forward | PF | Power forward | C | Center |

| Player | Team | Round | Pick # | Position | School |
|---|---|---|---|---|---|
| Marvin Bagley III | Sacramento Kings | 1 | 2 | PF | Duke |
| Wendell Carter Jr. | Chicago Bulls | 1 | 7 | C | Duke |
| Jerome Robinson | Los Angeles Clippers | 1 | 13 | SG | Boston College |
| Lonnie Walker IV | San Antonio Spurs | 1 | 18 | SG | Miami |
| Josh Okogie | Minnesota Timberwolves | 1 | 20 | SG | Georgia Tech |
| Grayson Allen | Utah Jazz | 1 | 21 | SG | Duke |
| Gary Trent Jr. | Portland Trail Blazers | 2 | 37 | SG | Duke |
| Bruce Brown Jr. | Detroit Pistons | 2 | 42 | SG | Miami |
| Devon Hall | Oklahoma City Thunder | 2 | 53 | SG | Virginia |
| Ray Spalding | Philadelphia 76ers^{(traded to Dallas)} | 2 | 56 | PF | Louisville |

== Attendance ==
| Team | Arena | Capacity | Game 1 | Game 2 | Game 3 | Game 4 | Game 5 | Game 6 | Game 7 | Game 8 | Game 9 | Game 10 | Total | Average | % of Capacity |
| Team | Arena | Capacity | Game 11 | Game 12 | Game 13 | Game 14 | Game 15 | Game 16 | Game 17 | Game 18 | Game 19 | Game 20 | Total | Average | % of Capacity |
| Boston College | Conte Forum | 8,606 | 4,522 | 3,104 | 3,130 | 3,277 | 8,606 | 3,989 | 4,669 | 5,538 | 3,911 | 5,247 | 87,731 | 5,161 | 60% |
| Boston College | Conte Forum | 8,606 | 4,953 | 5,867 | 4,091 | 4,763 | 7,740 | 8,606 | 5,718 | | | | 87,731 | 5,161 | 60% |
| Clemson | Littlejohn Coliseum | 9,000 | 8,188 | 5,528 | 5,526 | 5,932 | 7,434 | 8,031 | 6,847 | 9,000 | 7,594 | 9,000 | 123,895 | 7,743 | 86% |
| Clemson | Littlejohn Coliseum | 9,000 | 9,000 | 9,000 | 7,573 | 9,000 | 9,000 | 7,242 | | | | | 123,895 | 7,743 | 86% |
| Duke | Cameron Indoor Stadium | 9,314 | 9,314 | 9,314 | 9,314 | 9,314 | 9,314 | 9,314 | 9,314 | 9,314 | 9,314 | 9,314 | 149,024 | 9,314 | 100% |
| Duke | Cameron Indoor Stadium | 9,314 | 9,314 | 9,314 | 9,314 | 9,314 | 9,314 | 9,314 | | | | | 149,024 | 9,314 | 100% |
| Florida State | Donald L. Tucker Center | 12,100 | 7,455 | 5,284 | 6,021 | 7,323 | 5,836 | 5,003 | 8,931 | 10,604 | 10,938 | 9,879 | 127,685 | 8,512 | 70% |
| Florida State | Donald L. Tucker Center | 12,100 | 11,675 | 10,657 | 9,131 | 9,123 | 9,825 | | | | | | 127,685 | 8,512 | 70% |
| Georgia Tech | McCamish Pavilion | 8,600 | 5,154 | 4,504 | 4,867 | 5,562 | 4,925 | 6,514 | 5,156 | 4,522 | 5,341 | 5,568 | 123,843 | 6,518 | 76% |
| Georgia Tech | McCamish Pavilion | 8,600 | 6,630 | 7,771 | 8,600 | 8,600 | 8,600 | 8,600 | 8,600 | 6,907 | 7,422 | | 123,843 | 6,518 | 76% |
| Louisville | KFC Yum! Center | 22,090 | 18,304 | 18,112 | 18,046 | 17,524 | 19,244 | 22,090 | 20,030 | 16,236 | 16,388 | 16,841 | 342,560 | 18,209 | 82% |
| Louisville | KFC Yum! Center | 22,090 | 16,461 | 16,798 | 16,827 | 17,215 | 18,305 | 16,983 | 16,533 | 21,210 | 19,413 | | 342,560 | 18,209 | 82% |
| Miami | Watsco Center | 7,972 | 7,073 | 6,611 | 6,735 | 7,189 | 6,893 | 7,647 | 7,972 | 7,190 | 7,169 | 6,774 | 99,639 | 7,117 | 89% |
| Miami | Watsco Center | 7,972 | 7,333 | 6,879 | 7,010 | 7,164 | | | | | | | 99,639 | 7,117 | 89% |
| North Carolina | Dean Smith Center | 21,750 | 18,926 | 13,941 | 19,036 | 14,402 | 12,720 | 16,017 | 19,578 | 17,104 | 20,155 | 20,334 | 275,681 | 18,379 | 85% |
| North Carolina | Dean Smith Center | 21,750 | 21,750 | 20,381 | 21,750 | 19,336 | 20,251 | | | | | | 275,681 | 18,379 | 85% |
| NC State | PNC Arena | 19,722 | 14,805 | 13,602 | 10,472 | 13,422 | 15,270 | 13,842 | 13,957 | 13,695 | 14,899 | 19,500 | 270,612 | 15,918 | 81% |
| NC State | PNC Arena | 19,722 | 17,526 | 15,815 | 17,265 | 19,500 | 19,500 | 15,225 | 17,037 | 18,975 | | | 270,612 | 15,918 | 81% |
| Notre Dame | Edmund P. Joyce Center | 9,149 | 6,633 | 8,046 | 8,911 | 8,891 | 6,837 | 7,134 | 8,441 | 7,563 | 9,149 | 9,076 | 126,088 | 8,406 | 92% |
| Notre Dame | Edmund P. Joyce Center | 9,149 | 9,149 | 8,953 | 9,149 | 9,149 | 9,007 | | | | | | 126,088 | 8,406 | 92% |
| Pittsburgh | Petersen Events Center | 12,508 | 3,102 | 2,685 | 3,317 | 2,399 | 2,333 | 7,748 | 2,830 | 2,372 | 3,126 | 5,307 | 74,103 | 4,117 | 33% |
| Pittsburgh | Petersen Events Center | 12,508 | 9,180 | 3,544 | 2,566 | 7,033 | 4,772 | 2,835 | 2,420 | 6,534 | | | 74,103 | 4,117 | 33% |
| Syracuse | Carrier Dome | 35,446 | 21,720 | 19,601 | 16,644 | 15,534 | 16,237 | 20,852 | 21,380 | 17,335 | 20,976 | 21,925 | 407,778 | 21,462 | 61% |
| Syracuse | Carrier Dome | 35,446 | 20,688 | 24,304 | 21,259 | 21,262 | 27,083 | 24,018 | 21,125 | 27,165 | 28,670 | | 407,778 | 21,462 | 61% |
| Virginia | John Paul Jones Arena | 14,593 | 13,855 | 12,995 | 13,472 | 13,911 | 13,594 | 13,910 | 13,597 | 13,328 | 14,538 | 14,401 | 236,673 | 13,922 | 95% |
| Virginia | John Paul Jones Arena | 14,593 | 13,625 | 14,317 | 14,149 | 14,310 | 14,593 | 13,873 | 14,205 | | | | 236,673 | 13,922 | 95% |
| Virginia Tech | Cassell Coliseum | 10,052 | 9,275 | 9,275 | 4,951 | 5,390 | 7,101 | 7,265 | 6,578 | 5,043 | 6,979 | 5,945 | 138,023 | 7,668 | 76% |
| Virginia Tech | Cassell Coliseum | 10,052 | 5,478 | 9,275 | 9,275 | 9,275 | 9,275 | 9,275 | 9,275 | 9,275 | | | 138,023 | 7,668 | 76% |
| Wake Forest | LJVM Coliseum | 14,665 | 7,802 | 5,213 | 6,810 | 5,782 | 6,591 | 2,978 | 11,362 | 8,109 | 8,260 | 10,014 | 134,825 | 8,427 | 57% |
| Wake Forest | LJVM Coliseum | 14,665 | 13,209 | 7,809 | 10,468 | 6,133 | 13,641 | 10,626 | | | | | 134,825 | 8,427 | 57% |
