= 2017–18 Syracuse Orange men's basketball team =

American college basketball season

2017–18 Syracuse Orange men's basketball

NCAA tournament, Sweet Sixteen
- Conference: Atlantic Coast Conference
- Record: 23–14 (8–10 ACC)
- Head coach: Jim Boeheim (42nd season)
- Assistant coaches: Adrian Autry; Gerry McNamara; Allen Griffin
- Home arena: Carrier Dome

2017–18 ACC men's basketball standings
	Conf.				Overall
Team	W		L	PCT	W		L	PCT
No. 1 Virginia †	17	–	1	.944	31	–	3	.912
No. 9 Duke	13	–	5	.722	29	–	8	.784
No. 22 Miami (FL)	11	–	7	.611	22	–	10	.688
No. 20 Clemson	11	–	7	.611	25	–	10	.714
NC State	11	–	7	.611	21	–	12	.636
No. 10 North Carolina	11	–	7	.611	26	–	11	.703
Virginia Tech	10	–	8	.556	21	–	12	.636
Florida State	9	–	9	.500	23	–	12	.657
Louisville	9	–	9	.500	22	–	14	.611
Notre Dame	8	–	10	.444	21	–	15	.583
Syracuse	8	–	10	.444	23	–	14	.622
Boston College	7	–	11	.389	19	–	16	.543
Georgia Tech	6	–	12	.333	13	–	19	.406
Wake Forest	4	–	14	.222	11	–	20	.355
Pittsburgh	0	–	18	.000	8	–	24	.250
† 2018 ACC tournament winner Rankings from AP poll

The 2017–18 Syracuse Orange men's basketball team represented Syracuse University during the 2017–18 NCAA Division I men's basketball season. The Orange were led by 42nd-year head coach Jim Boeheim and played their home games at the Carrier Dome in Syracuse, New York as fifth-year members of the Atlantic Coast Conference. They finished the season 23–14, 8–10 in ACC play to finish in a tie for tenth place. They defeated Wake Forest in the first round of the 2018 ACC tournament before losing in the second round to North Carolina. They received one of the final four at-large bids to the NCAA tournament where, as a No. 11 seed, they defeated Arizona State in the First Four, and upset No. 6 seed TCU in the First Round and No. 3 seed Michigan State in the Second Round before losing in the Sweet Sixteen to fellow ACC member and No. 2 seed Duke.

== Previous season ==
The Orange finished the 2016–17 season 19–15, 10–8 in ACC play to finish in a three-way tie for seventh place. They lost in the second round of the ACC tournament to Miami. They were one of the last four teams not selected for the NCAA tournament and thus received a No. 1 seed in the National Invitation Tournament. There, they defeated UNC Greensboro in the first round before losing in the second round to Ole Miss.

== Offseason ==
=== Departures ===
Name	Number	Pos.	Height	Weight	Year	Hometown	Notes
Andrew White	3	F	6'7"	210	RS Senior	Richmond, VA	Graduated
John Gillon	4	G	6'0"	168	RS Senior	Houston, TX	Graduated
Mike Sutton	5	G	6'2"	194	Junior	Norwich, NY	Walk-on; left the team for personal reasons
Taurean Thompson	12	F	6'10"	220	Sophomore	Jersey City, NJ	Transferred to Seton Hall
Evan Dourdas	14	G	6'0"	160	Junior	Jamesville, NY	Walk-on; left the team for personal reasons
Tyler Lydon	20	F	6'8"	210	Sophomore	Elizaville, NY	Declared for 2017 NBA draft
Tyler Roberson	21	F	6'8"	226	Senior	Union, NJ	Graduated
DaJuan Coleman	32	C	6'9"	268	RS Senior	Jamesville, NY	Graduated
Jonathan Radner	33	G	5'10"	168	Sophomore	Huntington Woods, MI	Walk-on; left the team
Doyin Akintobi-Adeyeye	34	F	6'6"	230	Senior	Uniondale, NY	Graduated

=== Incoming transfers ===
Name	Number	Pos.	Height	Weight	Year	Hometown	Previous School
Elijah Hughes	4	G	6'6"	220	Sophomore	Somers, NY	Transferred from East Carolina. Under NCAA transfer rules, Hughes will have to sit out for the 2017–18 season. Will have three years of remaining eligibility.
Geno Thorpe	30	G	6'4"	170	RS Senior	Pittsburgh, PA	Transferred from South Florida. Eligible to play immediately since he graduated from South Florida.

=== 2017 recruiting class ===
College recruiting information
Name	Hometown	School	Height	Weight	Commit date
Oshae Brissett; SF	Mississauga, Ont., CAN	Athlete Institute Basketball Academy	6 ft 6 in (1.98 m)	195 lb (88 kg)	Nov 12, 2016
Oshae Brissett; SF	Recruit ratings: Scout: Rivals: (84)				
Bourama Sidibe #15 C	Newark, NJ	Saint Benedict's Prep	6 ft 10 in (2.08 m)	225 lb (102 kg)	Nov 21, 2016
Bourama Sidibe #15 C	Recruit ratings: Scout: Rivals: (82)				
Howard Washington; PG	Buffalo, NY	Athlete Institute Basketball Academy	6 ft 2 in (1.88 m)	172 lb (78 kg)	Mar 16, 2017
Howard Washington; PG	Recruit ratings: Scout: Rivals: (POST)				
Marek Doležaj; PF	Bratislava, Slovakia, EUR	MBK Karlovka	6 ft 9 in (2.06 m)	200 lb (91 kg)	Mar 16, 2017
Marek Doležaj; PF	Recruit ratings: Scout: Rivals: (NR)				
Overall recruit ranking:
Note: In many cases, Scout, Rivals, 247Sports, On3, and ESPN may conflict in their listings of height and weight.; In these cases, the average was taken. ESPN grades are on a 100-point scale.; Sources: "2017 Syracuse Signees". Rivals.; "2017 Syracuse Signees". Scout.; "2017 Syracuse Signees". ESPN.; "Scout.com Team Recruiting Rankings". Scout.; "2017 Team Ranking". Rivals.

=== Future recruits ===
==== 2018 recruiting class ====
College recruiting information (2018-2019)
Name	Hometown	School	Height	Weight	Commit date
Buddy Boeheim; SG	Syracuse, New York	Jamesville-DeWitt High School	6 ft 5 in (1.96 m)	180 lb (82 kg)	Sep 8, 2017
Buddy Boeheim; SG	Recruit ratings: Scout: Rivals: 247Sports: ESPN: (76)				
Jalen Carey; PG	Montclair, New Jersey	Immaculate Conception High School	6 ft 3 in (1.91 m)	170 lb (77 kg)	Oct 4, 2017
Jalen Carey; PG	Recruit ratings: Scout: Rivals: 247Sports: ESPN: (88)				
Overall recruit ranking:
Note: In many cases, Scout, Rivals, 247Sports, On3, and ESPN may conflict in their listings of height and weight.; In these cases, the average was taken. ESPN grades are on a 100-point scale.; Sources: "2018 Syracuse Signees". Rivals.; "2018 Syracuse Signees". Scout.; "2018 Syracuse Signees". ESPN.; "Scout.com Team Recruiting Rankings". Scout.; "2018 Team Ranking". Rivals.

== Roster ==
2017–18 Syracuse Orange men's basketball team
Players
Coaches

Pos.	#	Name	Height	Weight	Year	Previous school	Hometown
G	0	Adrian Autry (W)	6 ft 0 in (1.83 m)	182 lb (83 kg)	Jr	Jamesville-DeWitt	Jamesville, New York
F	2	Matthew Moyer	6 ft 8 in (2.03 m)	215 lb (98 kg)	RS So	South Kent School	Columbus, Ohio
G	4	Elijah Hughes (I) (redshirt)	6 ft 6 in (1.98 m)	215 lb (98 kg)	So	John F. Kennedy; East Carolina	Somers, New York
F	5	Patrick Herlihy (W)	6 ft 6 in (1.98 m)	205 lb (93 kg)	Sr	Charleston Catholic	Charleston, West Virginia
G	10	Howard Washington	6 ft 3 in (1.91 m)	175 lb (79 kg)	Fr	Athletic Institute Prep	Buffalo, New York
F	11	Oshae Brissett	6 ft 8 in (2.03 m)	210 lb (95 kg)	Fr	Athletic Institute Prep	Mississauga, Ontario
C	13	Paschal Chukwu	7 ft 2 in (2.18 m)	228 lb (103 kg)	RS Jr	Fairfield Prep; Providence	Westport, Connecticut
G	14	Braedon Bayer (W)	6 ft 4 in (1.93 m)	185 lb (84 kg)	Jr	Trinity-Pawling School; Grinnell College	Lagrangeville, New York
F	21	Marek Doležaj	6 ft 9 in (2.06 m)	180 lb (82 kg)	Fr	MBK Karlovka Bratislava	Bratislava, Slovakia
G	23	Frank Howard	6 ft 5 in (1.96 m)	205 lb (93 kg)	Jr	Paul IV	Suitland, Maryland
G	24	Shaun Belbey (W)	5 ft 10 in (1.78 m)	165 lb (75 kg)	Jr	Christian Brothers Academy	Brick, New Jersey
G	25	Tyus Battle	6 ft 6 in (1.98 m)	205 lb (93 kg)	So	St. Joseph	Edison, New Jersey
G	30	Geno Thorpe	6 ft 4 in (1.93 m)	170 lb (77 kg)	RS Sr	Shaler; South Florida	Pittsburgh, Pennsylvania
G	32	Ray Featherston (W)	5 ft 8 in (1.73 m)	150 lb (68 kg)	So	Choate Rosemary Hall	Wallingford, Connecticut
F	35	Bourama Sidibe	6 ft 10 in (2.08 m)	205 lb (93 kg)	Fr	St. Benedict's Prep	Newark, New Jersey
G	54	Ky Feldman (W)	5 ft 10 in (1.78 m)	150 lb (68 kg)	Jr	Agoura	Agoura Hills, California

Head coach

- Jim Boeheim, 42nd yr. (Syracuse, 1966)

Assistant coach(es)

- Adrian Autry, 7th yr. (Syracuse, 1994)
- Gerry McNamara, 9th yr. (Syracuse, 2007)
- Allen Griffin, 1st yr. (Syracuse, 2001)

Legend

- (C) Team captain
- (S) Suspended
- (I) Ineligible
- (W) Walk-on
- Injured
- Current redshirt

Roster

== Schedule and results ==
Date time, TV	Rank^{#}	Opponent^{#}	Result	Record	High points	High rebounds	High assists	Site (attendance) city, state
Exhibition
Nov 1, 2017*; 7:00 p.m.		Southern New Hampshire	W 84–54		20 – Battle	11 – Brisett	5 – Battle	Carrier Dome (8,668); Syracuse, NY
Nov 6, 2017*; 7:00 p.m.		Southern Connecticut State	W 84–59		20 – Battle	12 – Sidibe	4 – Thorpe	Carrier Dome (5,195); Syracuse, NY
Non-conference regular season
Nov 10, 2017*; 7:00 p.m., ACCN Extra		Cornell	W 77–45	1–0	18 – Battle	10 – Brissett	4 – Howard	Carrier Dome (21,720); Syracuse, NY
Nov 14, 2017*; 7:00 p.m., ACCN Extra		Iona	W 71–62	2–0	28 – Battle	10 – Chukwu	4 – Howard	Carrier Dome (19,601); Syracuse, NY
Nov 18, 2017*; 7:00 p.m., ACCN Extra		Texas Southern; Hoophall Miami Invitational	W 80–67	3–0	21 – Battle	10 – Brissett	8 – Howard	Carrier Dome (16,644); Syracuse, NY
Nov 20, 2017*; 7:00 p.m., ACCN Extra		Oakland; Hoophall Miami Invitational	W 74–50	4–0	25 – Battle	11 – Chukwu	6 – Howard	Carrier Dome (15,534); Syracuse, NY
Nov 22, 2017*; 7:00 p.m., ACCN Extra		Toledo; Hoophall Miami Invitational	W 72–64	5–0	25 – Howard	14 – Brissett	4 – Howard	Carrier Dome (16,237); Syracuse, NY
Nov 27, 2017*; 7:00 p.m., ESPN2		Maryland; ACC–Big Ten Challenge	W 72–70	6–0	18 – Battle	13 – Brissett	10 – Howard	Carrier Dome (20,852); Syracuse, NY
Dec 2, 2017*; 5:30 p.m., ESPN		vs. No. 2 Kansas; Hoophall Miami Invitational	L 60–76	6–1	22 – Battle	9 – Brissett	7 – Howard	American Airlines Arena (14,324); Miami, FL
Dec 5, 2017*; 9:00 p.m., ESPN		vs. UConn; Jimmy V Classic/Rivalry	W 72–63	7–1	22 – Battle	10 – Brissett	5 – Howard	Madison Square Garden (17,532); New York City, NY
Dec 9, 2017*; 2:00 p.m., RSN		Colgate	W 72–58	8–1	24 – Battle	9 – Chukwu	6 – Howard	Carrier Dome (21,380); Syracuse, NY
Dec 16, 2017*; 12:30 p.m., CBS		at Georgetown; Rivalry	W 86–79 ^{OT}	9–1	29 – Battle	14 – Brissett	9 – Howard	Capital One Arena (15,418); Washington, D.C.
Dec 19, 2017*; 7:00 p.m., ACCN Extra		Buffalo	W 81–74	10–1	25 – Brissett	9 – Moyer	4 – Howard	Carrier Dome (17,335); Syracuse, NY
Dec 22, 2017*; 7:00 p.m., ACCN Extra		St. Bonaventure	L 57–60 ^{OT}	10–2	17 – Howard	13 – Brissett	6 – Howard	Carrier Dome (20,976); Syracuse, NY
Dec 27, 2017*; 7:00 p.m., ESPN2		Eastern Michigan	W 62–47	11–2	22 – Battle	12 – Tied	7 – Howard	Carrier Dome (21,925); Syracuse, NY
ACC regular season
Dec 31, 2017; 6:00 p.m., ESPNU		Virginia Tech	W 68–56	12–2 (1–0)	19 – Brissett	13 – Moyer	4 – Howard	Carrier Dome (20,688); Syracuse, NY
Jan 3, 2018; 7:00 p.m., ESPNU		at Wake Forest	L 67–73	12–3 (1–1)	23 – Howard	8 – Moyer	5 – Howard	LJVM Coliseum (8,109); Winston-Salem, NC
Jan 6, 2018; 3:15 p.m., ESPN2		Notre Dame	L 49–51	12–4 (1–2)	21 – Battle	11 – Brissett	4 – Howard	Carrier Dome (24,304); Syracuse, NY
Jan 9, 2018; 8:00 p.m., ACCN		at No. 3 Virginia	L 61–68	12–5 (1–3)	18 – Howard	16 – Chukwu	1 – 3 tied	John Paul Jones Arena (13,625); Charlottesville, VA
Jan 13, 2018; 8:00 p.m., ACCN		at No. 23 Florida State	L 90–101 ^{2OT}	12–6 (1–4)	37 – Battle	11 – Chukwu	5 – Howard	Donald L. Tucker Civic Center (10,938); Tallahassee, FL
Jan 16, 2018; 9:00 p.m., RSN		Pittsburgh	W 59–45	13–6 (2–4)	18 – Howard	8 – Chukwu	4 – Howard	Carrier Dome (21,259); Syracuse, NY
Jan 24, 2018; 7:00 p.m., ESPNU		Boston College	W 81–63	14–6 (3–4)	24 – Battle	8 – Doležaj	6 – Howard	Carrier Dome (21,262); Syracuse, NY
Jan 27, 2018; 4:00 p.m., ACCN		at Pittsburgh	W 60–55	15–6 (4–4)	18 – Sidibe	16 – Sidibe	4 – Howard	Petersen Events Center (7,033); Pittsburgh, PA
Jan 31, 2018; 8:00 p.m., ACCN		at Georgia Tech	L 51–55	15–7 (4–5)	19 – Battle	9 – Battle	4 – Battle	McCamish Pavilion (8,600); Atlanta, GA
Feb 3, 2018; 4:00 p.m., ACCN		No. 2 Virginia	L 44–59	15–8 (4–6)	15 – Battle	7 – Doležaj	2 – Howard	Carrier Dome (27,083); Syracuse, NY
Feb 5, 2018; 7:00 p.m., ESPN		at Louisville	W 78–73	16–8 (5–6)	25 – Battle	8 – Tied	2 – 3 tied	KFC Yum! Center (16,983); Louisville, KY
Feb 11, 2018; 1:00 p.m., ACCN		Wake Forest	W 78–70	17–8 (6–6)	34 – Battle	11 – Chukwu	9 – Howard	Carrier Dome (24,018); Syracuse, NY
Feb 14, 2018; 9:00 p.m., ACCN		NC State	L 70–74	17–9 (6–7)	25 – Brissett	7 – Brissett	6 – Howard	Carrier Dome (21,125); Syracuse, NY
Feb 17, 2018; 12:00 p.m., CBS		at Miami (FL)	W 62–55	18–9 (7–7)	18 – Howard	12 – Brissett	6 – Howard	Watsco Center (6,879); Coral Gables, FL
Feb 21, 2018; 7:00 p.m., ESPN		No. 10 North Carolina	L 74–78	18–10 (7–8)	26 – Battle	11 – Chuwku	6 – Battle	Carrier Dome (27,165); Syracuse, NY
Feb 24, 2018; 6:00 p.m., ESPN		at No. 5 Duke	L 44–60	18–11 (7–9)	12 – Battle	12 – Chukwu	7 – Howard	Cameron Indoor Stadium (9,314); Durham, NC
Feb 28, 2018; 9:00 p.m., RSN		at Boston College	L 70–85	18–12 (7–10)	29 – Battle	9 – Tied	5 – Howard	Conte Forum (5,718); Chesnut Hill, MA
Mar 3, 2018; 2:00 p.m., ACCN		No. 18 Clemson	W 55–52	19–12 (8–10)	17 – Brissett	6 – Brissett	1 – Tied	Carrier Dome (28,670); Syracuse, NY
ACC Tournament
Mar 6, 2018; 7:00 p.m., ESPNU	(11)	vs. (14) Wake Forest; First Round	W 73–64	20–12	20 – Doležaj	9 – Tied	5 – Howard	Barclays Center (10,612); Brooklyn, NY
Mar 7, 2018; 9:30 p.m., ESPN2	(11)	vs. (6) No. 12 North Carolina; Second Round	L 59–78	20–13	20 – Brissett	10 – Brissett	4 – Howard	Barclays Center (17,732); Brooklyn, NY
NCAA tournament
Mar 14, 2018*; 9:10 p.m., truTV	(11 MW)	vs. (11 MW) Arizona State; First Four	W 60–56	21–13	23 – Brissett	12 – Brissett	3 – Tied	UD Arena (12,732); Dayton, OH
Mar 16, 2018*; 9:40 p.m., CBS	(11 MW)	vs. (6 MW) TCU; First Round	W 57–52	22–13	17 – Doležaj	10 – Chukwu	3 – Tied	Little Caesars Arena (20,314); Detroit, MI
Mar 18, 2018*; 2:40 p.m., CBS	(11 MW)	vs. (3 MW) No. 5 Michigan State; Second Round	W 55–53	23–13	17 – Battle	9 – Brissett	2 – Battle	Little Caesars Arena (20,360); Detroit, MI
Mar 23, 2018*; 9:37 p.m., CBS	(11 MW)	vs. (2 MW) No. 9 Duke; Sweet Sixteen	L 65–69	23–14	19 – Battle	8 – Howard	5 – Battle	CenturyLink Center Omaha (17,399); Omaha, NE
*Non-conference game. ^{#}Rankings from AP Poll. (#) Tournament seedings in parentheses. All times are in Eastern Time.

== Rankings ==
Ranking movements Legend: ██ Increase in ranking ██ Decrease in ranking — = Not ranked RV = Received votes
	Week																			
Poll	Pre	1	2	3	4	5	6	7	8	9	10	11	12	13	14	15	16	17	18	Final
AP	—	—	—	—	—	RV	RV	—	RV	—	—	—	—	—	—	—	—	—	—	Not released
Coaches	—	—	RV	RV	RV	RV	RV													RV

*AP does not release post-NCAA Tournament rankings
