= 2017–18 Florida State Seminoles men's basketball team =

American college basketball season

2017–18 Florida State Seminoles men's basketball

NCAA tournament, Elite Eight
- Conference: Atlantic Coast Conference

Ranking
- Coaches: No. 18
- Record: 23–12 (9–9 ACC)
- Head coach: Leonard Hamilton (16th season)
- Assistant coaches: Stan Jones (16th year); Charlton Young (5th year); Dennis Gates (7th year)
- Home arena: Donald L. Tucker Center (Capacity: 12,100)

2017–18 ACC men's basketball standings
	Conf.				Overall
Team	W		L	PCT	W		L	PCT
No. 1 Virginia †	17	–	1	.944	31	–	3	.912
No. 9 Duke	13	–	5	.722	29	–	8	.784
No. 22 Miami (FL)	11	–	7	.611	22	–	10	.688
No. 20 Clemson	11	–	7	.611	25	–	10	.714
NC State	11	–	7	.611	21	–	12	.636
No. 10 North Carolina	11	–	7	.611	26	–	11	.703
Virginia Tech	10	–	8	.556	21	–	12	.636
Florida State	9	–	9	.500	23	–	12	.657
Louisville	9	–	9	.500	22	–	14	.611
Notre Dame	8	–	10	.444	21	–	15	.583
Syracuse	8	–	10	.444	23	–	14	.622
Boston College	7	–	11	.389	19	–	16	.543
Georgia Tech	6	–	12	.333	13	–	19	.406
Wake Forest	4	–	14	.222	11	–	20	.355
Pittsburgh	0	–	18	.000	8	–	24	.250
† 2018 ACC tournament winner Rankings from AP poll

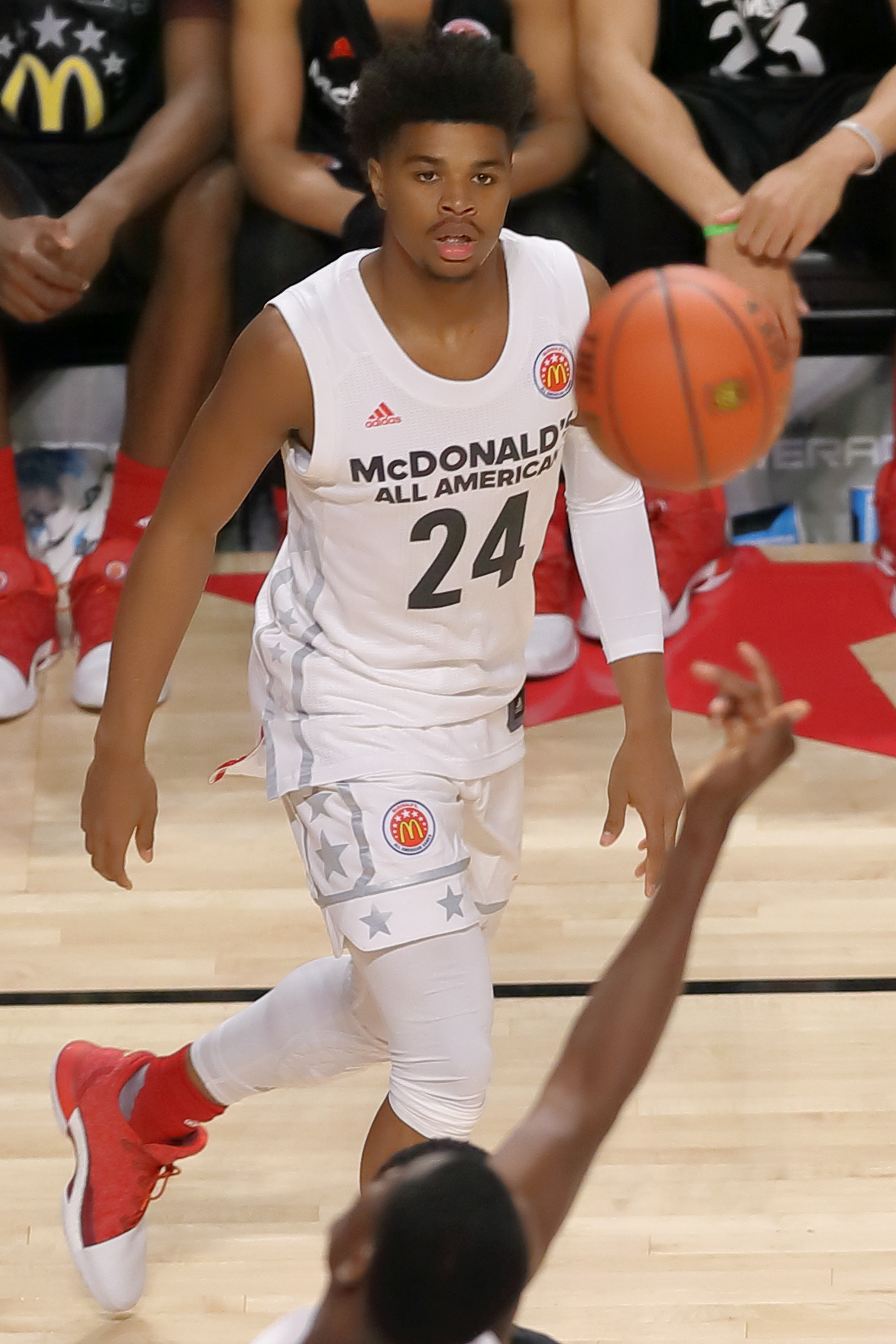
Florida State recruit M. J. Walker at the 2017 McDonald's All-American Boys Game.

The 2017–18 Florida State Seminoles men's basketball team represented Florida State University during the 2017–18 NCAA Division I men's basketball season. The Seminoles were led by head coach Leonard Hamilton, in his 16th year, and played their home games at the Donald L. Tucker Center on the university's Tallahassee, Florida campus as members of the Atlantic Coast Conference.

Florida State finished the season 23–12, 9–9 in ACC play, to finish in a tie for eighth place. The Seminoles lost in the second round of the ACC tournament to Louisville. They received an at-large bid to the NCAA tournament where they defeated Missouri in the first round, upset Xavier and Gonzaga before losing to Michigan.

== Previous season ==
The Seminoles finished the 2016–17 season with a record of 26–9, 12–6 in ACC play, to finish in a three-way tie for second place. They defeated Virginia Tech in the ACC tournament before losing to Notre Dame in the quarterfinals. They received an at-large bid to the NCAA tournament as the #3 seed in the West Region. There, they defeated #14 Florida Gulf Coast in the First Round before being upset by #11 Xavier in the Second Round.

== Offseason ==
=== Departures ===
Name	Number	Pos.	Height	Weight	Year	Hometown	Reason for departure
Jonathan Isaac	1	F	6'10"	210	Freshman	Naples, FL	Declare for 2017 NBA draft
Dwayne Bacon	4	G	6'7"	221	Sophomore	Lakeland, FL	Declare for 2017 NBA draft
Xavier Rathan-Mayes	22	G	6'4"	208	RS Junior	Scarborough, ON	Declare for 2017 NBA draft
Jarquez Smith	23	F	6'9"	236	Senior	Haddock, GA	Graduated
Michael Ojo	50	C	7'1"	304	RS Senior	Lagos, Nigeria	Graduated/Went undrafted in 2017 NBA draft

=== 2017 recruiting class ===
College recruiting information
Name	Hometown	School	Height	Weight	Commit date
M. J. Walker #5 SG	Jonesboro, GA	Jonesboro High School	6 ft 5 in (1.96 m)	207 lb (94 kg)	May 24, 2017
M. J. Walker #5 SG	Recruit ratings: Scout: Rivals: 247Sports: ESPN:				
Ikechukwu Obiagu #12 C	Atlanta, GA	Greenforest Christian Academy	7 ft 0 in (2.13 m)	230 lb (100 kg)	Nov 28, 2016
Ikechukwu Obiagu #12 C	Recruit ratings: Scout: Rivals: 247Sports: ESPN:				
RaiQuan Gray #23 PF	Fort Lauderdale, FL	Dillard High School	6 ft 8 in (2.03 m)	240 lb (110 kg)	Aug 8, 2016
RaiQuan Gray #23 PF	Recruit ratings: Scout: Rivals: 247Sports: ESPN:				
Wyatt Wilkes #35 PF	Winter Park, FL	Winter Park High School	6 ft 7 in (2.01 m)	200 lb (91 kg)	Aug 31, 2016
Wyatt Wilkes #35 PF	Recruit ratings: Scout: Rivals: 247Sports: ESPN:				
Anthony Polite #36 SG	Boca Raton, FL	St. Andrews School	6 ft 6 in (1.98 m)	210 lb (95 kg)	Aug 30, 2016
Anthony Polite #36 SG	Recruit ratings: Scout: Rivals: 247Sports: ESPN:				
Overall recruit ranking: Scout: N/A Rivals: N/A ESPN: N/A
Note: In many cases, Scout, Rivals, 247Sports, On3, and ESPN may conflict in their listings of height and weight.; In these cases, the average was taken. ESPN grades are on a 100-point scale.; Sources: "2017 Team Ranking". Rivals.

=== 2018 recruiting class ===
College recruiting information (2018)
Name	Hometown	School	Height	Weight	Commit date
Devin Vassell; SG	Suwanee, GA	Peachtree Ridge High School	6 ft 5 in (1.96 m)	170 lb (77 kg)	May 2, 2017
Devin Vassell; SG	Recruit ratings: Scout: Rivals: 247Sports: ESPN:				
Overall recruit ranking: Scout: N/A Rivals: N/A ESPN: N/A
Note: In many cases, Scout, Rivals, 247Sports, On3, and ESPN may conflict in their listings of height and weight.; In these cases, the average was taken. ESPN grades are on a 100-point scale.; Sources: "2018 Team Ranking". Rivals.

== Roster ==
2017–18 Florida State Seminoles men's basketball team
Players
Coaches

Pos.	#	Name	Height	Weight	Year	Previous school	Hometown
F	0	Phil Cofer	6 ft 8 in (2.03 m)	218 lb (99 kg)	Sr	Whitewater	Atlanta, GA
F	1	RaiQuan Gray	6 ft 8 in (2.03 m)	250 lb (113 kg)	Fr	Dillard	Fort Lauderdale, FL
G	2	CJ Walker	6 ft 1 in (1.85 m)	195 lb (88 kg)	So	Arsenal Technical	Indianapolis, IN
G	3	Trent Forrest	6 ft 5 in (1.96 m)	215 lb (98 kg)	So	Chipley	Chipley, FL
G	5	P. J. Savoy	6 ft 4 in (1.93 m)	200 lb (91 kg)	Jr	Las Vegas; Sheridan	Las Vegas, NV
G	11	Braian Angola	6 ft 6 in (1.98 m)	195 lb (88 kg)	Sr	Findlay Prep; North Idaho	Villanueva, Colombia
C	12	Ike Obiagu	7 ft 0 in (2.13 m)	240 lb (109 kg)	Fr	Greenforest Christian Academy (GA)	Anuja, Nigeria
G	13	Anthony Polite	6 ft 6 in (1.98 m)	210 lb (95 kg)	Fr	St. Andrew's Christian School	Lugano, Switzerland
G	14	Terance Mann	6 ft 6 in (1.98 m)	204 lb (93 kg)	Jr	Tilton School	Lowell, MA
G	15	Justin Lindner	6 ft 1 in (1.85 m)	175 lb (79 kg)	So	Christian Brothers	Memphis, TN
G	20	Travis Light (W)	6 ft 5 in (1.96 m)	175 lb (79 kg)	RS Fr	Montverde Academy	Vienna, VA
C	21	Christ Koumadje	7 ft 4 in (2.24 m)	233 lb (106 kg)	Jr	Montverde Academy	N'Djamena, Chad
F	23	M. J. Walker	6 ft 5 in (1.96 m)	205 lb (93 kg)	Fr	Jonesboro	Jonesboro, GA
F	25	Mfiondu Kabengele	6 ft 9 in (2.06 m)	235 lb (107 kg)	RS Fr	Don Bosco Prep	Burlington, ON
F	31	Wyatt Wilkes	6 ft 8 in (2.03 m)	210 lb (95 kg)	Fr	Winter Park	Orlando, FL
F	33	Will Miles (W)	6 ft 6 in (1.98 m)	220 lb (100 kg)	RS Fr	Trinity Prep	Orlando, FL
F	35	Harrison Prieto (W)	6 ft 8 in (2.03 m)	214 lb (97 kg)	So	St. Paul's School	Mandeville, FL
F	40	Brandon Allen (W)	6 ft 6 in (1.98 m)	209 lb (95 kg)	RS Sr	Milton	Milton, FL

Head coach

- Leonard Hamilton (UT Martin)

Assistant coach(es)

- Stan Jones (Memphis)
- Dennis Gates (California)
- Charlton Young (Georgia Southern)

Legend

- (C) Team captain
- (S) Suspended
- (I) Ineligible
- (W) Walk-on
- Injured
- Current redshirt

Roster

== Schedule ==
Date time, TV	Rank^{#}	Opponent^{#}	Result	Record	High points	High rebounds	High assists	Site (attendance) city, state
Jamaican Foreign Tour
Aug 10, 2017*		vs. Jamaican Select Team	W 117–65		–	–	–	Montego Bay Convention Center; Montego Bay, Jamaica
Aug 14, 2017*		vs. Minto 79ers	W 116–78		–	–	–	National Indoor Sport Center; Kingston, Jamaica
Aug 16, 2017*		vs. Jamaica Select Team	W 107–51		–	–	–	National Indoor Sport Center; Kingston, Jamaica
Exhibition
Oct 26, 2017*; 7:00 pm		Central Missouri	W 116–68		19 – Savoy	9 – Kabengele	4 – Polite	Donald L. Tucker Center (150); Tallahassee, FL
Nov 7, 2017*; 7:00 pm		Thomas (GA)	W 122–52		12 – Tied	7 – Obiagu	4 – Angola	Donald L. Tucker Center; Tallahassee, FL
Non-conference regular season
Nov 14, 2017*; 7:00 pm, RSN		George Washington	W 87–67	1–0	17 – Mann	8 – Mann	5 – Angola	Donald L. Tucker Center (7,455); Tallahassee, FL
Nov 17, 2017*; 6:00 pm, CBSSN		vs. Fordham; Jamaica Classic	W 67–43	2–0	15 – Kabengele	9 – Kabengele	5 – Forrest	Montego Bay Convention Center (235); Montego Bay, Jamaica
Nov 19, 2017*; 5:00 pm, CBSSN		vs. Colorado State; Jamaica Classic	W 90–73	3–0	22 – M. Walker	9 – Mann	8 – Angola	Montego Bay Convention Center (278); Montego Bay, Jamaica
Nov 22, 2017*; 2:00 pm, ACCN Extra		Kennesaw State	W 98–79	4–0	21 – Tied	9 – Cofer	6 – Forrest	Donald L. Tucker Center (5,284); Tallahassee, FL
Nov 24, 2017*; 8:00 pm, ACCN Extra		The Citadel; Jamaica Classic	W 113–78	5–0	21 – Tied	12 – Kabengele	8 – Mann	Donald L. Tucker Center (6,021); Tallahassee, FL
Nov 28, 2017*; 7:00 pm, ESPNU		at Rutgers; ACC-Big Ten Challenge	W 78–73	6–0	24 – C. Walker	10 – Obiagu	4 – Tied	Louis Brown Athletic Center (4,853); Piscataway, NJ
Dec 4, 2017*; 9:00 pm, ESPN2		at No. 5 Florida; Rivalry	W 83–66	7–0	25 – Mann	12 – Cofer	4 – C. Walker	O'Connell Center (10,425); Gainesville, FL
Dec 6, 2017*; 7:00 pm, ACCN Extra		Loyola (MD)	W 96–71	8–0	18 – Angola	7 – Mann	6 – C. Walker	Donald L. Tucker Center (7,323); Tallahassee, FL
Dec 10, 2017*; 12:00 pm, ESPNU		vs. Tulane; Heritage Insurance Classic	W 72–53	9–0	18 – Angola	8 – Tied	4 – Forrest	Amalie Arena (3,975); Tampa, FL
Dec 16, 2017*; 2:00 pm, FS2/FSS	No. 19	vs. Oklahoma State; Orange Bowl Basketball Classic	L 70–71	9–1	22 – Cofer	14 – Mann	6 – Forrest	BB&T Center (9,152); Sunrise, FL
Dec 18, 2017*; 7:00 pm, ESPNU	No. 24	Charleston Southern	W 69–58	10–1	19 – Cofer	6 – Tied	7 – Mann	Donald L. Tucker Center (5,836); Tallahassee, FL
Dec 21, 2017*; 7:00 pm, ACCN Extra	No. 24	Southern Miss	W 98–45	11–1	17 – Savoy	7 – Savoy	12 – Forrest	Donald L. Tucker Center (5,003); Tallahassee, FL
ACC regular season
Dec 30, 2017; 2:00 pm, CBS	No. 24	at No. 4 Duke	L 93–100	11–2 (0–1)	28 – Cofer	8 – Angola	5 – Tied	Cameron Indoor Stadium (9,314); Durham, NC
Jan 3, 2018; 7:00 pm, ESPN2	No. 24	No. 12 North Carolina	W 81–80	12–2 (1–1)	20 – Angola	9 – Mann	5 – Mann	Donald L. Tucker Center (8,931); Tallahassee, FL
Jan 7, 2018; 6:00 pm, ESPNU	No. 24	at No. 15 Miami (FL)	L 74–80	12–3 (1–2)	16 – Angola	12 – Kabengele	4 – Angola	Watsco Center (5,347); Coral Gables, FL
Jan 10, 2018; 9:00 pm, RSN	No. 23	Louisville	L 69–73	12–4 (1–3)	25 – Mann	10 – Cofer	2 – Tied	Donald L. Tucker Center (10,604); Tallahassee, FL
Jan 13, 2018; 2:00 pm, ACCN	No. 23	Syracuse	W 101–90 ^{2OT}	13–4 (2–3)	24 – Angola	11 – Forrest	8 – Angola	Donald L. Tucker Center (10,938); Tallahassee, FL
Jan 15, 2018; 7:00 pm, ESPNU		at Boston College	L 75–81	13–5 (2–4)	21 – Mann	9 – Tied	6 – C. Walker	Conte Forum (5,867); Chestnut Hill, MA
Jan 20, 2018; 12:00 pm, ESPN2		at Virginia Tech	W 91–82	14–5 (3–4)	24 – M. Walker	8 – Kabengele	7 – C. Walker	Cassell Coliseum (9,275); Blacksburg, VA
Jan 24, 2018; 7:00 pm, RSN		Georgia Tech	W 88–77	15–5 (4–4)	30 – Mann	5 – Mann	5 – Mann	Donald L. Tucker Center (9,879); Tallahassee, FL
Jan 27, 2018; 4:00 pm, ACCN		Miami (FL)	W 103–94 ^{OT}	16–5 (5–4)	21 – Cofer	8 – Cofer	6 – Angola	Donald L. Tucker Center (11,675); Tallahassee, FL
Jan 31, 2018; 8:00 pm, ACCN		at Wake Forest	L 72–76	16–6 (5–6)	23 – Cofer	8 – Koumadje	5 – Forrest	LJVM Coliseum (7,809); Winston-Salem, NC
Feb 3, 2018; 4:00 pm, ACCN		at Louisville	W 80–76	17–6 (6–5)	16 – Cofer	9 – Forrest	5 – Forrest	KFC Yum! Center (18,305); Louisville, KY
Feb 7, 2018; 7:00 pm, RSN		No. 2 Virginia	L 55–59	17–7 (6–6)	10 – M. Walker	6 – Kabengele	4 – Tied	Donald L. Tucker Center (10,657); Tallahassee, FL
Feb 10, 2018; 4:00 pm, ESPN2		at Notre Dame	L 69–84	17–8 (6–7)	16 – C. Walker	8 – Mann	4 – Forrest	Joyce Center (9,149); South Bend, IN
Feb 14, 2018; 7:00 pm, RSN		No. 11 Clemson	W 81–79 ^{OT}	18–8 (7–7)	17 – Cofer	8 – Mann	3 – Forrest	Donald L. Tucker Center (9,131); Tallahassee, FL
Feb 18, 2018; 6:00 pm, ESPNU		Pittsburgh	W 88–75	19–8 (8–7)	18 – Savoy	6 – Tied	4 – Forrest	Donald L. Tucker Center (9,123); Tallahassee, FL
Feb 25, 2018; 6:00 pm, ESPNU	No. 25	at NC State	L 72–92	19–9 (8–8)	16 – Forrest	8 – Koumadje	7 – Forrest	PNC Arena (17,037); Raleigh, NC
Feb 28, 2018; 7:00 pm, ESPNU		at No. 18 Clemson	L 63–76	19–10 (8–9)	21 – Cofer	7 – Cofer	4 – Mann	Littlejohn Coliseum (7,242); Clemson, SC
Mar 3, 2018; 2:00 pm, ACCN		Boston College	W 85–76	20–10 (9–9)	21 – Tied	12 – Obiagu	5 – Forrest	Donald L. Tucker Center (9,825); Tallahassee, FL
ACC Tournament
Mar 7, 2018; 12:00 pm, ESPN	(8)	vs. (9) Louisville; Second Round	L 74–82	20–11	14 – Tied	6 – Tied	6 – Forrest	Barclays Center (17,732); Brooklyn, NY
NCAA tournament
Mar 16, 2018*; 9:45 pm, TBS	(9 W)	vs. (8 W) Missouri; First Round	W 67–54	21–11	14 – Kabengele	12 – Kabengele	8 – Forrest	Bridgestone Arena (17,549); Nashville, TN
Mar 18, 2018*; 8:40 pm, TNT	(9 W)	vs. (1 W) No. 3 Xavier; Second Round	W 75–70	22–11	16 – Angola	6 – Tied	3 – Tied	Bridgestone Arena (17,552); Nashville, TN
Mar 22, 2018*; 10:10 pm, TBS	(9 W)	vs. (4 W) No. 8 Gonzaga; Sweet Sixteen	W 75–60	23–11	18 – Mann	6 – Tied	6 – Forrest	Staples Center (19,181); Los Angeles, CA
Mar 24, 2018*; 8:49 pm, TBS	(9 W)	vs. (3 W) No. 7 Michigan; Elite Eight	L 54–58	23–12	16 – Cofer	11 – Cofer	2 – Tied	Staples Center (19,665); Los Angeles, CA
*Non-conference game. ^{#}Rankings from AP Poll. (#) Tournament seedings in parentheses. W=West region. All times are in Eastern Time.

== Awards ==
=== Watchlists ===
- Jerry West Award

M.J. Walker

== Rankings ==
Ranking movements Legend: ██ Increase in ranking ██ Decrease in ranking — = Not ranked RV = Received votes
	Week																				
Poll	Pre	1	2	3	4	5	6	7	8	9	10	11	12	13	14	15	16	17	18	19	Final
AP	—	—	—	—	RV	19	24	24	24	23	RV	RV	RV	RV	RV	RV	25	RV	RV	RV	N/A
Coaches	RV	RV^	—	RV	RV	RV	19	25	25	RV	RV	RV	RV	RV	RV	—	RV	RV	RV	18	18

^Coaches did not release a Week 2 poll
*AP does not release post-NCAA Tournament rankings
