= 2017–18 Louisville Cardinals men's basketball team =

American college basketball season

2017–18 Louisville Cardinals men's basketball

NIT, Quarterfinals
- Conference: Atlantic Coast Conference
- Record: 22–14 (9–9 ACC)
- Head coach: David Padgett (Interim)
- Assistant coaches: Trent Johnson; Greg Paulus; R. J. Evans
- Home arena: KFC Yum! Center

2017–18 ACC men's basketball standings
	Conf.				Overall
Team	W		L	PCT	W		L	PCT
No. 1 Virginia †	17	–	1	.944	31	–	3	.912
No. 9 Duke	13	–	5	.722	29	–	8	.784
No. 22 Miami (FL)	11	–	7	.611	22	–	10	.688
No. 20 Clemson	11	–	7	.611	25	–	10	.714
NC State	11	–	7	.611	21	–	12	.636
No. 10 North Carolina	11	–	7	.611	26	–	11	.703
Virginia Tech	10	–	8	.556	21	–	12	.636
Florida State	9	–	9	.500	23	–	12	.657
Louisville	9	–	9	.500	22	–	14	.611
Notre Dame	8	–	10	.444	21	–	15	.583
Syracuse	8	–	10	.444	23	–	14	.622
Boston College	7	–	11	.389	19	–	16	.543
Georgia Tech	6	–	12	.333	13	–	19	.406
Wake Forest	4	–	14	.222	11	–	20	.355
Pittsburgh	0	–	18	.000	8	–	24	.250
† 2018 ACC tournament winner Rankings from AP poll

The 2017–18 Louisville Cardinals men's basketball team represented the University of Louisville during the 2017–18 NCAA Division I men's basketball season. The team played its home games on Denny Crum Court at the KFC Yum! Center in downtown Louisville, Kentucky as members of the Atlantic Coast Conference. They were led by interim head coach David Padgett after former head coach Rick Pitino was fired due to an FBI investigation into the school. They finished the season 22–14 overall, and 9–9 in ACC conference play, finishing in a tie for 8th with Florida State, who they defeated in the second round of the ACC tournament before losing to Virginia in the quarterfinals. They received an invitation to the NIT, where they defeated Northern Kentucky in the first round and Middle Tennessee in the second round before being defeated in the quarterfinals by Mississippi State.

Following their NIT quarterfinal loss, Louisville announced that Padgett would not be retained as head coach. On March 27, 2018, Xavier head coach Chris Mack was hired by Louisville.

== Previous season ==
The Cardinals finished the 2016–17 season with a record of 25–9, 12–6 in ACC play to finish in a three-way tie for second place. They lost to Duke in the quarterfinals of the ACC tournament. They received an at-large bid to the NCAA tournament as a No. 2 seed in the Midwest Region. They defeated #15 Jacksonville State in the First Round before being upset by #7 Michigan in the Second Round.

== FBI investigation ==
On September 26, 2017, federal prosecutors in New York announced that the school was under investigation for an alleged "pay for play" scheme involving recruits at Louisville. The allegations state that an Adidas executive conspired to pay $100,000 to the family of a top-ranked national recruit to play at Louisville and to represent Adidas when he turned pro. The criminal complaint does not name Louisville specifically but appears to involve the recruitment of Brian Bowen, a late, surprise commit to the school. On September 27, head coach Rick Pitino and athletic director Tom Jurich were placed on administrative leave.

Assistant coach David Padgett was named interim head coach on September 29. On October 6, the school also placed associate head coach Kenny Johnson and assistant coach Jordan Fair on administrative leave. On October 11, Louisville announced that Trent Johnson, former head coach at LSU and Stanford, was hired as an assistant coach. On the same day, the school announced assistant coach Jordan Fair had been fired. On October 19, Louisville hired former Ohio State assistant Greg Paulus as an assistant.

On October 16, 2017, the school officially fired Rick Pitino as head coach.

== Offseason ==
=== Departures ===
Name	Number	Pos.	Height	Weight	Year	Hometown	Reason for departure
Tony Hicks	1	G	6'1"	180	Graduate Student	South Holland, IL	Graduated
Matz Stockman	5	F/C	7'0"	240	Junior	Oslo, Norway	Transferred to Minnesota
Jaylen Johnson	10	F	6'9"	230	Junior	Ypsilanti, MI	Declare for 2017 NBA draft
Jay Henderson	11	G	6'4"	180	RS Sophomore	Orlando, FL	Walk-on; transferred
Mangok Mathiang	12	F/C	6'10"	230	RS Senior	Melbourne, Australia	Graduated/Went undrafted in 2017 NBA draft
Tyler Sharpe	15	G	6'1"	185	Freshman	Louisville, KY	Walk-on; transferred to Northern Kentucky
David Levitch	23	F	6'3"	180	Senior	Goshen, KY	Graduated
Donovan Mitchell	45	G	6'3"	200	Sophomore	Greenwich, CT	Declare for 2017 NBA draft

=== Incoming transfers ===
Name	Number	Pos.	Height	Weight	Year	Hometown	Previous School
Steven Enoch	23	C	6'10"	250	Junior	Norwalk, CT	Transferred from Connecticut. Under NCAA transfer rules, Enoch will have to sit out for the 2017–18 season. Will have two years of remaining eligibility.

=== 2017 recruiting class ===
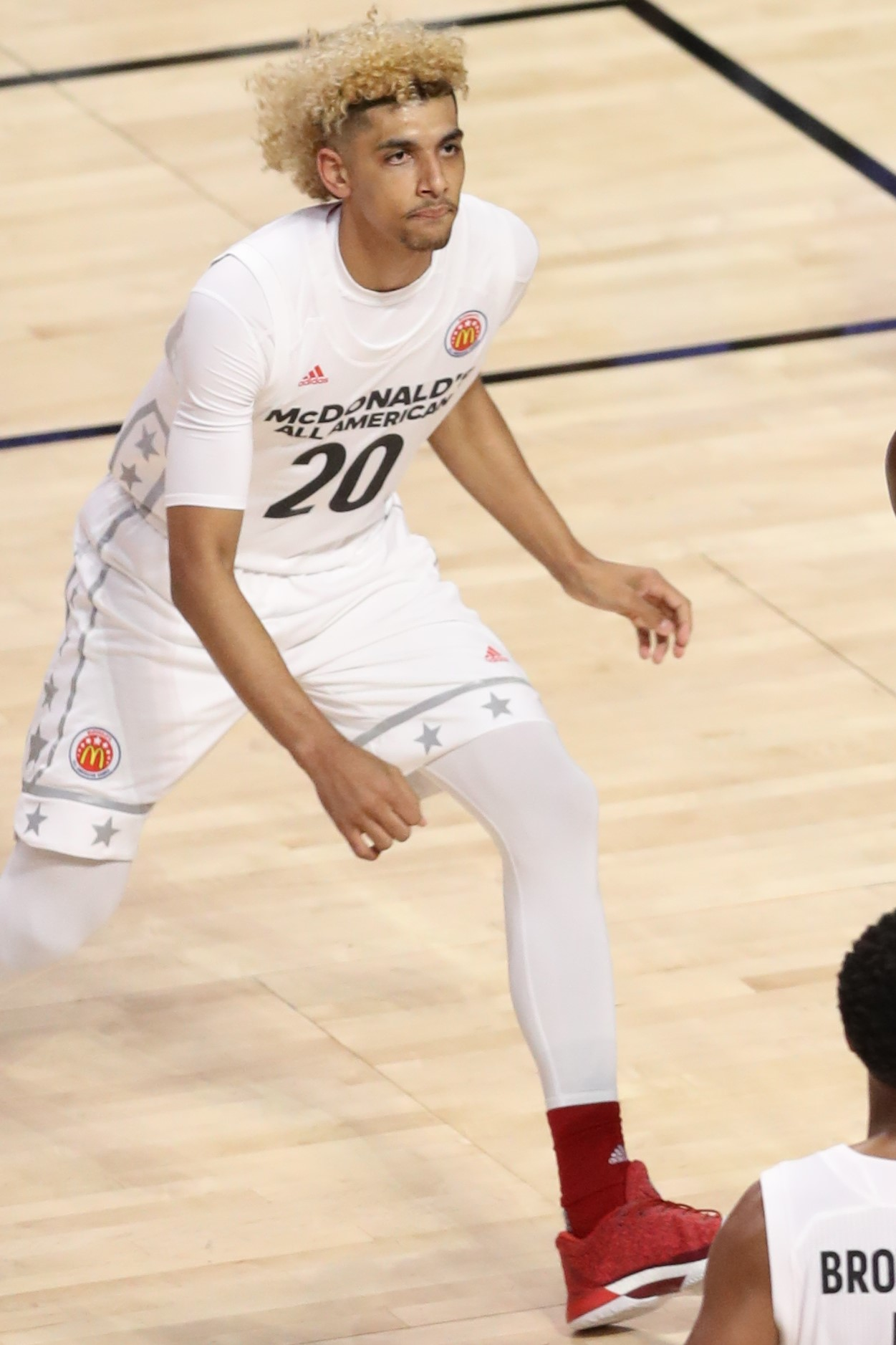
Louisville recruit Brian Bowen at the 2017 McDonald's All-American Boys Game.

College recruiting information
Name	Hometown	School	Height	Weight	Commit date
Brian Bowen; SF	Saginaw, MI	La Lumiere School	6 ft 7 in (2.01 m)	215 lb (98 kg)	Jun 3, 2017
Brian Bowen; SF	Recruit ratings: Scout: Rivals: 247Sports: ESPN:				
Malik Williams; C	Fort Wayne, IN	Snider High School	7 ft 0 in (2.13 m)	200 lb (91 kg)	Aug 4, 2016
Malik Williams; C	Recruit ratings: Scout: Rivals: 247Sports: ESPN:				
Darius Perry; PG	Marietta, GA	Wheeler High School	6 ft 2 in (1.88 m)	170 lb (77 kg)	Aug 16, 2016
Darius Perry; PG	Recruit ratings: Scout: Rivals: 247Sports: ESPN:				
Jordan Nwora; SF	Buffalo, NY	Vermont Academy	6 ft 8 in (2.03 m)	220 lb (100 kg)	Oct 19, 2016
Jordan Nwora; SF	Recruit ratings: Scout: Rivals: 247Sports: ESPN:				
Lance Thomas; PF	Norcross, GA	Norcross High School	6 ft 10 in (2.08 m)	210 lb (95 kg)	Oct 30, 2016
Lance Thomas; PF	Recruit ratings: Scout: Rivals: 247Sports: ESPN:				
Overall recruit ranking:
Note: In many cases, Scout, Rivals, 247Sports, On3, and ESPN may conflict in their listings of height and weight.; In these cases, the average was taken. ESPN grades are on a 100-point scale.; Sources: "2017 Louisville Commitments". Rivals.; "Men's Basketball Recruiting". Scout.; "ESPN- Louisville Cardinals Men's Basketball Recruiting". ESPN.; "Scout.com Team Recruiting Rankings". Scout.; "2017 Team Ranking". Rivals.

== Roster ==
On September 27, 2017, the school suspended Brian Bowen from the team due to the ongoing FBI investigation. On October 1, it was reported that Bowen had hired an attorney to seek reinstatement to the team.

2017–18 Louisville Cardinals men's basketball team
Players
Coaches

Pos.	#	Name	Height	Weight	Year	Previous school	Hometown
F	0	V. J. King	6 ft 6 in (1.98 m)	190 lb (86 kg)	So	Paul VI	Cleveland, Ohio
F	1	Lance Thomas	6 ft 8 in (2.03 m)	210 lb (95 kg)	Fr	Norcross	Norcross, Georgia
G	2	Darius Perry	6 ft 2 in (1.88 m)	170 lb (77 kg)	Fr	Wheeler	Marietta, Georgia
G	3	Jo Griffin (W)	6 ft 1 in (1.85 m)	175 lb (79 kg)	Fr	South Oldham	LaGrange, Kentucky
G	4	Quentin Snider	6 ft 2 in (1.88 m)	175 lb (79 kg)	Sr	Ballard	Louisville, Kentucky
F/C	5	Malik Williams	6 ft 11 in (2.11 m)	215 lb (98 kg)	Fr	Snider	Fort Wayne, Indiana
G	12	Jacob Redding (W)	6 ft 1 in (1.85 m)	165 lb (75 kg)	Fr	Carroll	Fort Wayne, Indiana
F	13	Ray Spalding	6 ft 10 in (2.08 m)	215 lb (98 kg)	Jr	Trinity	Louisville, Kentucky
F	14	Anas Mahmoud	7 ft 0 in (2.13 m)	215 lb (98 kg)	Sr	West Oaks (FL)	Cairo, Egypt
F	22	Deng Adel	6 ft 7 in (2.01 m)	200 lb (91 kg)	Jr	Victory Rock Prep	Melbourne, Australia
C	23	Steven Enoch (redshirt)	6 ft 10 in (2.08 m)	250 lb (113 kg)	Jr	St. Thomas More; Connecticut	Norwalk, Connecticut
F	24	Dwayne Sutton	6 ft 5 in (1.96 m)	200 lb (91 kg)	RS So	duPont Manuel; UNC Asheville	Louisville, Kentucky
G	30	Ryan McMahon	6 ft 0 in (1.83 m)	170 lb (77 kg)	RS So	Cardinal Mooney	Sarasota, Florida
F	33	Jordan Nwora	6 ft 8 in (2.03 m)	215 lb (98 kg)	Fr	Vermont Academy	Buffalo, New York

Head coach

- David Padgett (Louisville)

Assistant coach(es)

- Trent Johnson (Boise State)
- Greg Paulus (Duke)
- R. J. Evans (Holy Cross)

Legend

- (C) Team captain
- (S) Suspended
- (I) Ineligible
- (W) Walk-on
- Injured
- Current redshirt

Roster

== Schedule and results ==
Date time, TV	Rank^{#}	Opponent^{#}	Result	Record	High points	High rebounds	High assists	Site (attendance) city, state
Exhibition
Oct 30, 2017*; 7:00 pm, ACCN Extra		Kentucky Wesleyan	W 101–64	–	20 – Mahmoud	7 – Tied	5 – Snider	KFC Yum! Center (14,818); Louisville, KY
Nov 7, 2017*; 7:00 pm, ACCN Extra	No. 16	Bellarmine	W 72–57		21 – Adel	11 – Mahmoud	6 – Snider	KFC Yum! Center; Louisville, KY
Non-conference regular season
Nov 12, 2017*; 2:00 pm, RSN	No. 16	George Mason	W 72–61	1–0	20 – Adel	9 – Mahmoud	3 – 3 tied	KFC Yum! Center (18,304); Louisville, KY
Nov 17, 2017*; 7:00 pm, ACCN Extra	No. 18	Omaha	W 87–78	2–0	21 – Adel	11 – Spalding	4 – Tied	KFC Yum! Center (18,112); Louisville, KY
Nov 21, 2017*; 7:00 pm, RSN	No. 19	Southern Illinois	W 84–42	3–0	18 – Nwora	8 – Nwora	7 – Perry	KFC Yum! Center (18,046); Louisville, KY
Nov 24, 2017*; 7:00 pm, ACCN Extra	No. 19	Saint Francis (PA)	W 84–72	4–0	19 – Spalding	13 – Spalding	6 – Snider	KFC Yum! Center (17,524); Louisville, KY
Nov 28, 2017*; 8:00 pm, ESPN	No. 17	at Purdue; ACC–Big Ten Challenge	L 57–66	4–1	17 – King	9 – Spalding	6 – Snider	Mackey Arena (14,804); West Lafayette, IN
Dec 3, 2017*; 4:00 pm, ESPN2	No. 17	Seton Hall; Billy Minardi Classic	L 77–79	4–2	20 – Adel	8 – Spalding	2 – Tied	KFC Yum! Center (19,244); Louisville, KY
Dec 6, 2017*; 7:00 pm, ESPNU		Siena; Gotham Classic	W 86–60	5–2	17 – Mahmoud	13 – Mahmoud	5 – Adel	KFC Yum! Center (22,090); Louisville, KY
Dec 9, 2017*; 2:00 pm, ESPN		Indiana	W 71–62	6–2	16 – Adel	14 – Spalding	5 – Snider	KFC Yum! Center (20,030); Louisville, KY
Dec 11, 2017*; 7:00 pm, ESPNU		Bryant; Gotham Classic	W 102–59	7–2	17 – 3 tied	9 – Tied	4 – Tied	KFC Yum! Center (16,236); Louisville, KY
Dec 16, 2017*; 12:00 pm, ESPN2		vs. Memphis; Gotham Classic/Rivalry	W 81–72	8–2	19 – Snider	9 – Spalding	5 – Snider	Madison Square Garden (6,525); New York, NY
Dec 20, 2017*; 9:00 pm, ESPNU		Albany; Gotham Classic	W 70–68	9–2	19 – Snider	9 – Sutton	4 – Snider	KFC Yum! Center (16,388); Louisville, KY
Dec 23, 2017*; 1:00 pm, ACCN Extra		Grand Canyon	W 74–56	10–2	21 – Spalding	16 – Spalding	5 – Snider	KFC Yum! Center (16,841); Louisville, KY
Dec 29, 2017*; 1:00 pm, CBS		at No. 16 Kentucky; The Battle for the Bluegrass	L 61–90	10–3	13 – Adel	11 – Spalding	4 – Snider	Rupp Arena (24,228); Lexington, KY
ACC regular season
Jan 2, 2018; 9:00 pm, ESPNU		Pittsburgh	W 77–51	11–3 (1–0)	19 – Snider	8 – Sutton	4 – Snider	KFC Yum! Center (16,461); Louisville, KY
Jan 6, 2018; 9:00 pm, ACCN/WAVE-TV		at No. 25 Clemson	L 69–74 ^{OT}	11–4 (1–1)	16 – Spalding	14 – Spalding	5 – Snider	Littlejohn Coliseum (7,594); Clemson, SC
Jan 10, 2018; 7:00 pm, RSN		at No. 23 Florida State	W 73–69	12–4 (2–1)	16 – Adel	6 – 3 tied	6 – Snider	Donald L. Tucker Civic Center (10,604); Tallahassee, FL
Jan 13, 2018; 4:00 pm, ESPN2		Virginia Tech	W 94–86	13–4 (3–1)	27 – Adel	11 – Adel	3 – 3 tied	KFC Yum! Center (16,798); Louisville, KY
Jan 16, 2018; 7:00 pm, ESPN2		at Notre Dame	W 82–78 ^{2OT}	14–4 (4–1)	23 – Spalding	12 – Spalding	7 – Snider	Edmund P. Joyce Center (9,076); South Bend, IN
Jan 21, 2018; 12:00 pm, ACCN/WAVE-TV		Boston College	W 77–69	15–4 (5–1)	18 – Adel	11 – Spalding	5 – Adel	KFC Yum! Center (16,827); Louisville, KY
Jan 24, 2018; 7:30 pm, ESPN2		at Miami (FL)	L 75–78 ^{OT}	15–5 (5–2)	18 – Snider	13 – Spalding	3 – Snider	Watsco Center (7,190); Coral Gables, FL
Jan 27, 2018; 8:00 pm, ACCN/WAVE-TV		Wake Forest	W 96–77	16–5 (6–2)	15 – Tied	5 – Tied	4 – Tied	KFC Yum! Center (17,215); Louisville, KY
Jan 31, 2018; 7:00 pm, ESPN2		at No. 2 Virginia	L 64–74	16–6 (6–3)	16 – Spalding	7 – Spalding	2 – 3 tied	John Paul Jones Arena (14,310); Charlottesville, VA
Feb 3, 2018; 4:00 pm, ACCN/WAVE-TV		Florida State	L 76–80	16–7 (6–4)	17 – Adel	9 – Spalding	7 – Snider	KFC Yum! Center (18,305); Louisville, KY
Feb 5, 2018; 7:00 pm, ESPN		Syracuse	L 73–78	16–8 (6–5)	18 – Spalding	9 – Spalding	5 – Adel	KFC Yum! Center (16,983); Louisville, KY
Feb 8, 2018; 7:00 pm, ESPN2		Georgia Tech	W 77–54	17–8 (7–5)	16 – Nwora	7 – Mahmoud	7 – Snider	KFC Yum! Center (16,533); Louisville, KY
Feb 11, 2018; 1:00 pm, ACCN/WAVE-TV		at Pittsburgh	W 94–60	18–8 (8–5)	14 – 3 tied	6 – 3 tied	7 – Perry	Petersen Events Center (4,772); Pittsburgh, PA
Feb 17, 2018; 8:15 pm, ESPN		No. 14 North Carolina	L 76–93	18–9 (8–6)	20 – Adel	12 – Spalding	6 – Adel	KFC Yum! Center (21,210); Louisville, KY
Feb 21, 2018; 9:00 pm, ESPN		at No. 5 Duke	L 56–82	18–10 (8–7)	17 – Spalding	10 – Spalding	4 – Snider	Cameron Indoor Stadium (9,314); Durham, NC
Feb 24, 2018; 1:00 pm, CBS		at Virginia Tech	W 75–68	19–10 (9–7)	22 – Snider	11 – Sutton	8 – Adel	Cassell Coliseum (9,275); Blacksburg, VA
Mar 1, 2018; 8:00 pm, ACCN/WAVE-TV		No. 1 Virginia	L 66–67	19–11 (9–8)	18 – Adel	9 – Spalding	4 – Adel	KFC Yum! Center (19,413); Louisville, KY
Mar 3, 2018; 6:00 pm, ESPN		at NC State	L 69–76	19–12 (9–9)	20 – Adel	7 – Tied	6 – Snider	PNC Arena (18,975); Raleigh, NC
ACC Tournament
Mar 7, 2018; 12:00 pm, ESPN2	(9)	vs. (8) Florida State; Second Round	W 82–74	20–12	19 – Snider	8 – Adel	6 – Snider	Barclays Center (17,732); Brooklyn, NY
Mar 8, 2018; 12:00 pm, ESPN	(9)	vs. (1) No. 1 Virginia; Quarterfinals	L 58–75	20–13	16 – Spalding	6 – Spalding	3 – Tied	Barclays Center (17,732); Brooklyn, NY
NIT
Mar 13, 2018*; 7:00 pm, ESPN	(2)	(7) Northern Kentucky; First Round – Baylor Bracket	W 66–58	21–13	20 – Adel	13 – Spalding	3 – Tied	KFC Yum! Center (9,974); Louisville, KY
Mar 18, 2018*; 6:30 pm, ESPN2	(2)	(3) Middle Tennessee; Second Round – Baylor Bracket	W 84–68	22–13	18 – Spalding	6 – King	8 – Snider	KFC Yum! Center (13,050); Louisville, KY
Mar 20, 2018*; 9:00 pm, ESPN	(2)	(4) Mississippi State; Quarterfinals – Baylor Bracket	L 56–79	22–14	13 – Spalding	11 – Spalding	3 – Adel	KFC Yum! Center (10,718); Louisville, KY
*Non-conference game. ^{#}Rankings from AP Poll. (#) Tournament seedings in parentheses. MW=Midwest Region. All times are in Eastern Time.

== Rankings ==
Ranking movements Legend: ██ Increase in ranking ██ Decrease in ranking — = Not ranked RV = Received votes
	Week																			
Poll	Pre	1	2	3	4	5	6	7	8	9	10	11	12	13	14	15	16	17	18	Final
AP	16	18	19	17	RV	RV	RV	RV	RV	—	—	RV	RV	RV	—	RV				Not released
Coaches	16	16	18	17	RV	RV	RV	RV	RV	RV	—	—	RV	RV	RV	RV				

*AP does not release post-NCAA Tournament rankings
