= Jalek Felton =

American basketball player (born 1998)

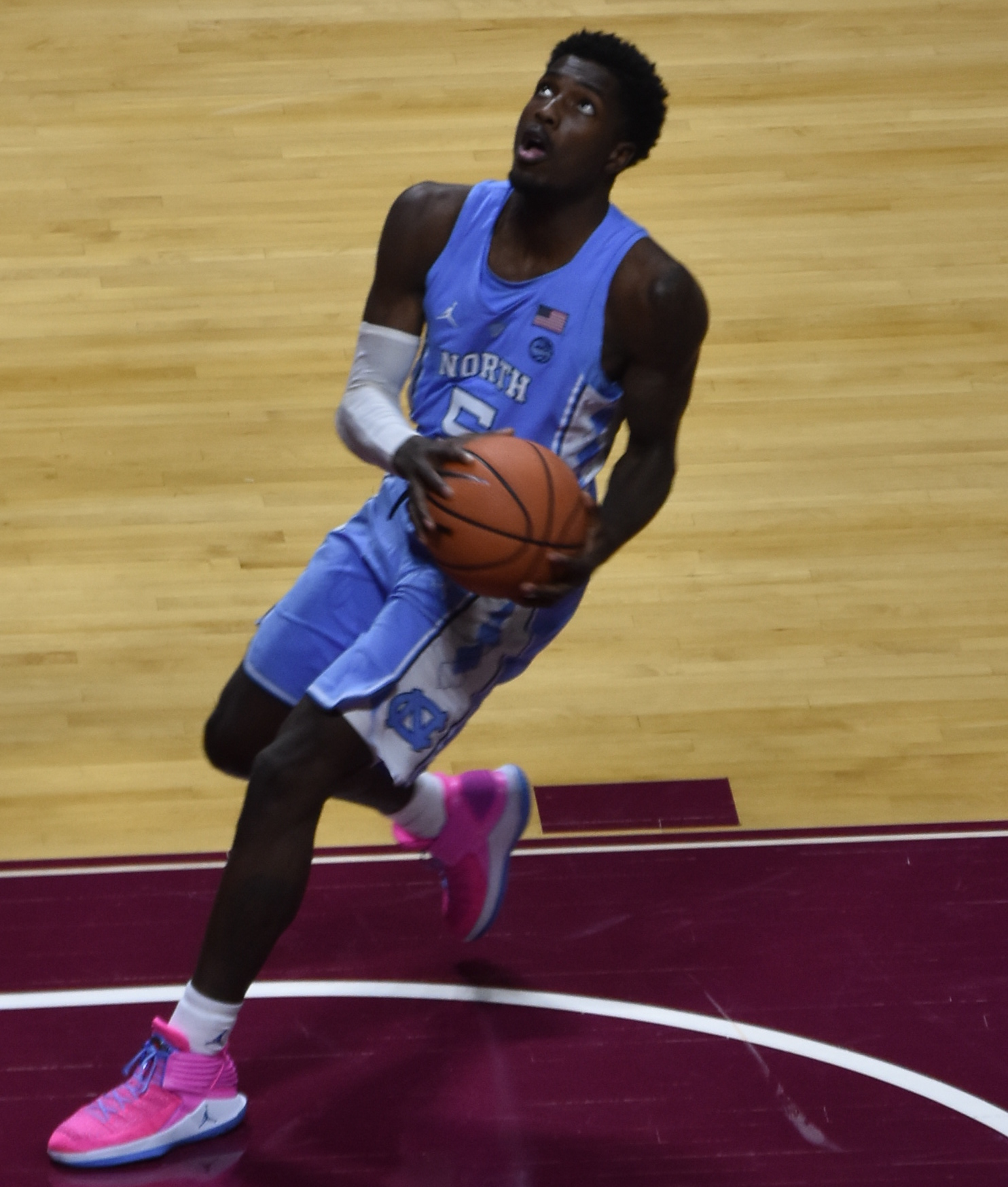

Lions Jindřichův Hradec
- Position: Point guard
- League: National Basketball League

Personal information
- Born: May 1, 1998 (age 28) Mullins, South Carolina, U.S.
- Listed height: 1.91 m (6 ft 3 in)
- Listed weight: 86 kg (190 lb)

Career information
- High school: Mullins (Mullins, South Carolina); Gray Collegiate Academy (West Columbia, South Carolina)
- College: North Carolina (2017–2018)
- NBA draft: 2019: undrafted
- Playing career: 2018–present

Career history
- 2018: Petrol Olimpija
- 2019: BC Nokia
- 2020: Venados de Mazatlán
- 2020–present: Fiobanka Jindřichův Hradec

Career highlights
- CIBACOPA All-Star (2023); South Carolina Mr. Basketball (2017)
Medals
Men's 3x3 basketball
Representing United States
FIBA Under-18 World Cup Dunk Contest
Silver medal – second place	2015 Hungary	Team

Jalek Shiquan Felton (born May 1, 1998) is an American professional basketball player for Fiobanka Jindřichův Hradec of the Czech National Basketball League. He played college basketball for the North Carolina Tar Heels.

== High school career ==
Coming into college basketball, Jalek Felton was the 28th-best player in class. He signed with North Carolina over Kansas and South Carolina.

== College career ==
Felton played one season for North Carolina, where he averaged 2.9 points per game in 22 games. He was suspended by the university on January 30, 2018, in response to misconduct allegations for reasons that remained largely unknown at the time. In March of that year, Felton withdrew from the university; documents released in August 2020 under a court order in response to a public records lawsuit by The Daily Tar Heel show that he was found to have committed "Sexual Assault or Sexual Violence" by the university and was expelled from the entire UNC System, given a no-contact order, and banned from the campus for four years. Felton considered transferring to a different school after leaving UNC, but ultimately opted to turn professional.

Season averages
Season	Team	Min	FGM–FGA	FG%	3PM–3PA	3P%	FTM–FTA	FT%	Reb	Ast	Blk	Stl	PF	TO	Pts
2017–18	UNC	9.7	1.1–2.8	.387	0.5–1.6	.314	0.2–0.3	.667	0.9	1.6	0.1	0.4	0.5	1.1	2.9

== Professional career ==
Felton started playing professional basketball for Petrol Olimpija in 2018. In the beginning of 2019 he signed a deal with BC Nokia.

In February 2020, Felton signed a contract to play for the Venados de Mazatlán of the Mexican Circuito de Baloncesto de la Costa del Pacífico (CIBACOPA). In two games he posted 8.0 points, 2.5 rebounds and 4.5 assists per game. On September 21, Felton signed with Czech club Fiobanka Jindřichův Hradec.

Felton returned to the Venados de Mazatlán ahead of the 2023 CIBACOPA season. He was named an All-Star in 2023.

== Personal life ==
His uncle Raymond Felton is a former professional basketball player who played in the NBA for 14 years after playing at North Carolina as well.
