= 2017–18 NC State Wolfpack men's basketball team =

American college basketball season

2017–18 NC State Wolfpack men's basketball

NCAA tournament, First Round
- Conference: Atlantic Coast Conference
- Record: 21–12 (11–7 ACC)
- Head coach: Kevin Keatts (1st season)
- Assistant coaches: James Johnson; Takayo Siddle; A. W. Hamilton
- Home arena: PNC Arena

2017–18 ACC men's basketball standings
	Conf.				Overall
Team	W		L	PCT	W		L	PCT
No. 1 Virginia †	17	–	1	.944	31	–	3	.912
No. 9 Duke	13	–	5	.722	29	–	8	.784
No. 22 Miami (FL)	11	–	7	.611	22	–	10	.688
No. 20 Clemson	11	–	7	.611	25	–	10	.714
NC State	11	–	7	.611	21	–	12	.636
No. 10 North Carolina	11	–	7	.611	26	–	11	.703
Virginia Tech	10	–	8	.556	21	–	12	.636
Florida State	9	–	9	.500	23	–	12	.657
Louisville	9	–	9	.500	22	–	14	.611
Notre Dame	8	–	10	.444	21	–	15	.583
Syracuse	8	–	10	.444	23	–	14	.622
Boston College	7	–	11	.389	19	–	16	.543
Georgia Tech	6	–	12	.333	13	–	19	.406
Wake Forest	4	–	14	.222	11	–	20	.355
Pittsburgh	0	–	18	.000	8	–	24	.250
† 2018 ACC tournament winner Rankings from AP poll

The 2017–18 NC State Wolfpack men's basketball team represented North Carolina State University during the 2017–18 NCAA Division I men's basketball season. The Wolfpack, led by first-year head coach Kevin Keatts, played its home games at PNC Arena in Raleigh, North Carolina and were members of the Atlantic Coast Conference (ACC). They finished the season 21–12, 11–7 in ACC play to finish in a tie for third place. They lost in the second round of the ACC tournament to Boston College. They received an at-large bid to the NCAA tournament where they lost in the first round to Seton Hall.

== Previous season ==
The Wolfpack finished the 2016–17 season 15–17, 4–14 in ACC play to finish in 13th place. They lost to Clemson in the first round of the ACC tournament.

== Offseason ==
=== Departures ===
Name	Number	Pos.	Height	Weight	Year	Hometown	Notes
Terry Henderson	3	G	6'5"	190	Senior	Raleigh, NC	Graduated
Dennis Smith Jr.	4	G	6'3"	195	Freshman	Fayetteville, NC	Declared for 2017 NBA draft
Cameron Gottfried	12	G	6'3"	183	Junior	Raleigh, NC	Walk-on; left the team for personal reasons
Chris Corchiani Jr.	13	G	6'0"	180	Junior	Raleigh, NC	Walk-on; left the team for personal reasons
Chris Brickhouse	15	F	6'5"	205	Senior	Raleigh, NC	Walk-on; graduated
BeeJay Anya	21	F	6'9"	320	Senior	Washington, D.C.	Graduated
Ted Kapita	23	F	6'2"	219	Freshman	Kinshasa, DR Congo	Declared for 2017 NBA Draft
Maverick Rowan	24	G/F	6'7"	220	Sophomore	Fort Lauderdale, FL	Turned pro
Tucker Thompson	42	F/C	6'10"	248	Junior	Huntersville, North Carolina	Walk-on; left the team to focus on academics

=== Class of 2017 Recruiting Class ===
College recruiting
Name	Hometown	School	Height	Weight	Commit date
Lavar Batts; PG	Concord, NC	J.M. Robinson High School	6 ft 2 in (1.88 m)	165 lb (75 kg)	Apr 1, 2017
Lavar Batts; PG	Recruit ratings: Scout: Rivals: 247Sports: ESPN:				
Braxton Beverly; PG	Hazard, KY	Hargrave Military Academy	5 ft 11 in (1.80 m)	170 lb (77 kg)	Jul 28, 2017
Braxton Beverly; PG	Recruit ratings: Scout: Rivals: 247Sports: ESPN:				
Overall recruit ranking:
Note: In many cases, Scout, Rivals, 247Sports, On3, and ESPN may conflict in their listings of height and weight.; In these cases, the average was taken. ESPN grades are on a 100-point scale.; Sources: "2017 Team Ranking". Rivals.

=== Incoming transfers ===
Name	Number	Pos.	Height	Weight	Year	Hometown	Previous School
Al Freeman	12	G	6'3"	200	RS Senior	Charlotte, NC	Transferred from Baylor. Will be eligible to play immediately since Freeman graduated from Baylor.
Sam Hunt	15	G	6'2"	185	RS Senior	Greensboro, NC	Transferred from NC A&T. Will be eligible to play immediately since Hunt graduated from NC A&T.
C. J. Bryce	13	G	6'5"	185	Junior	Huntersville, NC	Transferred from UNC Wilmington. Under NCAA transfer rules, Bryce will have to sit out for the 2017–18 season. Will have two years of remaining eligibility.
Devon Daniels	24	G	6'5"	200	Sophomore	Battle Creek, MI	Transferred from Utah. Under NCAA transfer rules, Daniels will have to sit out for the 2017–18 season. Will have three years of remaining eligibility.

== Future recruits ==
=== 2018–19 team recruits ===
College recruiting (2018)
Name	Hometown	School	Height	Weight	Commit date
Immanuel Bates; PF	Fayetteville, NC	Northwood Temple Academy	6 ft 9 in (2.06 m)	195 lb (88 kg)	Sep 15, 2017
Immanuel Bates; PF	Recruit ratings: Scout: Rivals: 247Sports: ESPN:				
Ian Steere; PF	Fayetteville, NC	Northwood Temple Academy	6 ft 9 in (2.06 m)	261 lb (118 kg)	Oct 6, 2017
Ian Steere; PF	Recruit ratings: Scout: Rivals: 247Sports: ESPN:				
Jericole Hellems; SF	St. Louis, MO	Chaminade College Prep	6 ft 6 in (1.98 m)	190 lb (86 kg)	Oct 20, 2017
Jericole Hellems; SF	Recruit ratings: Scout: Rivals: 247Sports: ESPN:				
Overall recruit ranking:
Note: In many cases, Scout, Rivals, 247Sports, On3, and ESPN may conflict in their listings of height and weight.; In these cases, the average was taken. ESPN grades are on a 100-point scale.; Sources: "2018 Team Ranking". Rivals.

== Roster ==
2017–18 NC State Wolfpack men's basketball team
Players
Coaches

Pos.	#	Name	Height	Weight	Year	Hometown
F	0	Abdul-Malik Abu	6 ft 8 in (2.03 m)	240 lb (109 kg)	Sr	Boston, Massachusetts
F	1	Lennard Freeman	6 ft 8 in (2.03 m)	267 lb (121 kg)	RS Sr	Washington, D.C.
G/F	2	Torin Dorn	6 ft 6 in (1.98 m)	208 lb (94 kg)	RS Jr	Charlotte, North Carolina
G	3	Lavar Batts Jr.	6 ft 2 in (1.88 m)	170 lb (77 kg)	Fr	Concord, North Carolina
F	5	Darius Hicks (injured)	6 ft 7 in (2.01 m)	231 lb (105 kg)	So	Quitman, Mississippi
G	10	Braxton Beverly	6 ft 0 in (1.83 m)	180 lb (82 kg)	Fr	Hazard, Kentucky
G	11	Markell Johnson	6 ft 1 in (1.85 m)	164 lb (74 kg)	So	Cleveland, Ohio
G	12	Allerik Freeman	6 ft 3 in (1.91 m)	210 lb (95 kg)	RS Sr	Charlotte, North Carolina
G	13	CJ Bryce (redshirt)	6 ft 5 in (1.96 m)	195 lb (88 kg)	Jr	Charlotte, North Carolina
F/C	14	Ömer Yurtseven	7 ft 0 in (2.13 m)	245 lb (111 kg)	So	Istanbul, Turkey
G	15	Sam Hunt	6 ft 2 in (1.88 m)	185 lb (84 kg)	RS Sr	Greensboro, North Carolina
G	24	Devon Daniels (redshirt)	6 ft 5 in (1.96 m)	200 lb (91 kg)	So	Battle Creek, Michigan
G	31	Spencer Newman (W)	6 ft 3 in (1.91 m)	186 lb (84 kg)	RS Fr	Daphne, Alabama

Head coach

- Kevin Keatts (Ferrum)

Assistant coach(es)

- James Johnson (Ferrum)
- Takayo Siddle (Gardner–Webb)
- A. W. Hamilton (Marshall)

Legend

- (C) Team captain
- (S) Suspended
- (I) Ineligible
- (W) Walk-on
- Injured
- Current redshirt

Roster
Last update: 14 January 2018

== Schedule and results ==
Date time, TV	Rank^{#}	Opponent^{#}	Result	Record	High points	High rebounds	High assists	Site (attendance) city, state
Exhibition
Nov 3, 2017*; 7:00 pm		Mars Hill	W 109–66	–	19 – Dorn	10 – L. Freeman	12 – Johnson	PNC Arena; Raleigh, NC
Non-conference regular season
Nov 10, 2017*; 7:00 pm, ACCN Extra		VMI	W 102–67	1–0	17 – A. Freeman	8 – Tied	9 – Johnson	PNC Arena (14,805); Raleigh, NC
Nov 12, 2017*; 4:00 pm, ACCN Extra		Charleston Southern	W 78–56	2–0	18 – A. Freeman	8 – L. Freeman	9 – Johnson	PNC Arena (13,602); Raleigh, NC
Nov 14, 2017*; 7:00 pm, ACCN Extra		Bryant	W 95–72	3–0	26 – Dorn	5 – 5 tied	11 – Johnson	PNC Arena (10,472); Raleigh, NC
Nov 16, 2017*; 7:00 pm, ACCN Extra		Presbyterian; Battle 4 Atlantis campus site game	W 86–68	4–0	23 – L. Freeman	9 – Dorn	7 – Johnson	PNC Arena (13,422); Raleigh, NC
Nov 22, 2017*; 7:00 pm, ESPN3		vs. No. 2 Arizona; Battle 4 Atlantis quarterfinals	W 90–84	5–0	24 – A. Freeman	8 – Tied	8 – Johnson	Imperial Arena (2,850); Paradise Island, Bahamas
Nov 23, 2017*; 3:00 pm, ESPN2		vs. Northern Iowa; Battle 4 Atlantis semifinals	L 60–64	5–1	17 – Yurtseven	13 – Yurtseven	3 – Johnson	Imperial Arena (892); Paradise Island, Bahamas
Nov 24, 2017*; 2:30 pm, ESPN2		vs. Tennessee; Battle 4 Atlantis third place game	L 58–67	5–2	14 – A. Freeman	9 – A. Freeman	3 – A. Freeman	Imperial Arena (1,329); Paradise Island, Bahamas
Nov 29, 2017*; 7:15 pm, ESPNU		Penn State; ACC–Big Ten Challenge	W 85–78	6–2	19 – Yurtseven	12 – Dorn	3 – 3 tied	PNC Arena (15,270); Raleigh, NC
Dec 2, 2017*; 12:00 pm, RSN		South Carolina State	W 103–71	7–2	19 – L. Freeman	10 – Dorn	12 – Johnson	PNC Arena (13,842); Raleigh, NC
Dec 9, 2017*; 2:00 pm, ACCN Extra		UMKC; Heritage Game	W 88–69	8–2	22 – Dorn	17 – Dorn	7 – Beverly	Reynolds Coliseum (5,500); Raleigh, NC
Dec 16, 2017*; 12:00 pm, RSN		UNC Greensboro	L 76–81	8–3	17 – A. Freeman	7 – L. Freeman	8 – Beverly	PNC Arena (13,957); Raleigh, NC
Dec 19, 2017*; 7:00 pm, ACCN Extra		Robert Morris	W 81–69	9–3	17 – Dorn	12 – L. Freeman	4 – Beverly	PNC Arena (13,695); Raleigh, NC
Dec 22, 2017*; 7:00 pm, RSN		Jacksonville	W 116–64	10–3	25 – A. Freeman	9 – Tied	11 – Beverly	PNC Arena (14,899); Raleigh, NC
ACC regular season
Dec 30, 2017; 4:00 pm, RSN		at Clemson	L 62–78	10–4 (0–1)	15 – Beverly	10 – Tied	3 – Beverly	Littlejohn Coliseum (9,000); Clemson, SC
Jan 3, 2018; 9:00 pm, ACCN		at Notre Dame	L 58–88	10–5 (0–2)	13 – A. Freeman	5 – Dorn	5 – Beverly	Edmund P. Joyce Center (7,563); South Bend, IN
Jan 6, 2018; 8:00 pm, ESPN		No. 2 Duke	W 96–85	11–5 (1–2)	16 – Tied	9 – Yurtseven	5 – 3 tied	PNC Arena (19,500); Raleigh, NC
Jan 11, 2018; 9:00 pm, ESPN		No. 19 Clemson	W 78–77	12–5 (2–2)	29 – Yurtseven	6 – Dorn	5 – Tied	PNC Arena (17,526); Raleigh, NC
Jan 14, 2018; 6:00 pm, ESPNU		at No. 3 Virginia	L 51–68	12–6 (2–3)	16 – Dorn	6 – Yurtseven	5 – Johnson	John Paul Jones Arena (14,317); Charlottesville, VA
Jan 18, 2018; 8:00 pm, ACCN		Wake Forest; Rivalry	W 72–63	13–6 (3–3)	22 – Yurtseven	8 – Yurtseven	9 – Beverly	PNC Arena (15,815); Raleigh, NC
Jan 21, 2018; 12:00 pm, ACCN		No. 25 Miami (FL)	L 81–86	13–7 (3–4)	28 – Yurtseven	6 – Yurtseven	14 – Johnson	PNC Arena (17,265); Raleigh, NC
Jan 24, 2018; 9:00 pm, RSN		at Pittsburgh	W 72–68	14–7 (4–4)	16 – Yurtseven	9 – Dorn	12 – Johnson	Petersen Events Center (2,566); Pittsburgh, PA
Jan 27, 2018; 12:00 pm, CBS		at No. 10 North Carolina; Rivalry	W 95–91 ^{OT}	15–7 (5–4)	29 – A. Freeman	13 – Yurtseven	11 – Johnson	Dean Smith Center (21,750); Chapel Hill, NC
Feb 3, 2018; 12:00 pm, ESPN		Notre Dame	W 76–58	16–7 (6–4)	21 – Dorn	10 – Yurtseven	10 – Johnson	PNC Arena (19,500); Raleigh, NC
Feb 7, 2018; 9:00 pm, RSN		at Virginia Tech	L 75–85	16–8 (6–5)	20 – Yurtseven	7 – Abu	10 – Johnson	Cassell Coliseum (9,275); Blacksburg, VA
Feb 10, 2018; 2:00 pm, ACCN		No. 21 North Carolina; Carolina–State Game	L 89–96	16–9 (6–6)	21 – Dorn	5 – Yurtseven	9 – Johnson	PNC Arena (19,500); Raleigh, NC
Feb 14, 2018; 9:00 pm, ACCN		at Syracuse	W 74–70	17–9 (7–6)	17 – A. Freeman	6 – Yurtseven	5 – Tied	Carrier Dome (21,125); Syracuse, NY
Feb 17, 2018; 4:00 pm, ACCN		at Wake Forest; Rivalry	W 90–84	18–9 (8–6)	24 – A. Freeman	8 – A. Freeman	10 – Johnson	LJVM Coliseum (13,641); Winston-Salem, NC
Feb 20, 2018; 7:00 pm, RSN		Boston College	W 82–66	19–9 (9–6)	20 – A. Freeman	7 – Dorn	8 – Johnson	PNC Arena (15,225); Raleigh, NC
Feb 25, 2018; 6:00 pm, ESPNU		No. 25 Florida State	W 92–72	20–9 (10–6)	25 – A. Freeman	5 – Dorn	8 – Beverly	PNC Arena (17,037); Raleigh, NC
Mar 1, 2018; 8:00 pm, ACCN		at Georgia Tech	L 75–78	20–10 (10–7)	19 – A. Freeman	9 – Yurtseven	6 – Beverly	Hank McCamish Pavilion (6,907); Atlanta, GA
Mar 3, 2018; 6:00 pm, ESPN		Louisville	W 76–69	21–10 (11–7)	16 – A. Freeman	8 – Dorn	6 – A. Freeman	PNC Arena (18,975); Raleigh, NC
ACC Tournament
Mar 7, 2018; 2:00 pm, ESPN/ACCN	(5)	vs. (12) Boston College; Second Round	L 87–91	21–11	21 – A. Freeman	9 – Yurtseven	6 – Johnson	Barclays Center (18,103); Brooklyn, NY
NCAA tournament
Mar 15, 2018*; 4:30 pm, TBS	(9 MW)	vs. (8 MW) Seton Hall; First Round	L 83–94	21–12	36 – A. Freeman	12 – Dorn	4 – Johnson	Intrust Bank Arena (14,390); Wichita, Kansas
*Non-conference game. ^{#}Rankings from AP Poll. (#) Tournament seedings in parentheses. All times are in Eastern Time.
