= 2017–18 Virginia Cavaliers men's basketball team =

American college basketball season

2017–18 Virginia Cavaliers men's basketball

ACC regular season and tournament champions NIT Season Tip-Off champions

NCAA tournament, First Round
- Conference: Atlantic Coast Conference

Ranking
- Coaches: No. 5
- AP: No. 1
- Record: 31–3 (17–1 ACC)
- Head coach: Tony Bennett (9th season)
- Associate head coach: Ron Sanchez (9th season)
- Assistant coaches: Jason Williford (9th season); Brad Soderberg (3rd season)
- Offensive scheme: Blocker-Mover
- Base defense: Pack-Line
- Captains: Devon Hall; Isaiah Wilkins; Jack Salt
- Home arena: John Paul Jones Arena

2017–18 ACC men's basketball standings
	Conf.				Overall
Team	W		L	PCT	W		L	PCT
No. 1 Virginia †	17	–	1	.944	31	–	3	.912
No. 9 Duke	13	–	5	.722	29	–	8	.784
No. 22 Miami (FL)	11	–	7	.611	22	–	10	.688
No. 20 Clemson	11	–	7	.611	25	–	10	.714
NC State	11	–	7	.611	21	–	12	.636
No. 10 North Carolina	11	–	7	.611	26	–	11	.703
Virginia Tech	10	–	8	.556	21	–	12	.636
Florida State	9	–	9	.500	23	–	12	.657
Louisville	9	–	9	.500	22	–	14	.611
Notre Dame	8	–	10	.444	21	–	15	.583
Syracuse	8	–	10	.444	23	–	14	.622
Boston College	7	–	11	.389	19	–	16	.543
Georgia Tech	6	–	12	.333	13	–	19	.406
Wake Forest	4	–	14	.222	11	–	20	.355
Pittsburgh	0	–	18	.000	8	–	24	.250
† 2018 ACC tournament winner Rankings from AP poll

The 2017–18 Virginia Cavaliers men's basketball team represented the University of Virginia during the 2017–18 NCAA Division I men's basketball season. The team was led by head coach Tony Bennett in his ninth year, and played their home games at John Paul Jones Arena in Charlottesville, Virginia as members of the Atlantic Coast Conference.

In a year with low expectations from the press, the Cavaliers began unranked but ascended all the way to the No. 1 ranking in the AP Poll for the first time since December 1982. (Note: The Cavaliers also became the first team in the AP Poll era, dating to the 1948–49 season, to rise to #1 despite losing a game in the prior week (at home in overtime to Virginia Tech). Virginia's rise was aided by the previous #1 and #3 teams, respectively Villanova and Purdue, also losing at home.) The team held on to that ranking through the end of the regular season, and became the first ACC team to win 17 conference games. The Cavaliers won the ACC tournament by handily defeating Louisville 75–58, Clemson 64–58, and North Carolina 71–63 in the championship game. In the process the team broke the school's single-season win record, which had twice been tied by Bennett-led teams in the past five years.

ACC Sixth Man of the Year De'Andre Hunter broke his wrist in the ACC Tournament victory, and was announced to be out for the NCAA tournament two days before it began. UVA entered as the No. 1 overall seed, placed in the South regional, but suffered an upset in the first round to UMBC and became the first No. 1 seed to lose to a No. 16 seed since the field expanded to 64 teams in 1985. The first-round losses by No. 1 seed Virginia and No. 4 seed Arizona, and second-round losses by No. 2 seed Cincinnati and No. 3 seed Tennessee, led to the South Region becoming the first ever to not advance any of its top four seeds to the Sweet Sixteen.

Nevertheless, for taking an unranked team to finish four games above pre-season AP No. 1 ranked Duke and winning the ACC Tournament over North Carolina, Bennett was awarded his third Henry Iba Award for the nation's top coach of the season.

== Previous season ==
The Cavaliers finished the 2016–17 season 23–11, and 11–7 in ACC play to tie Duke for fifth place. They defeated Pittsburgh in the second round of the ACC tournament to advance to the quarterfinals, where they lost to Notre Dame. The Wahoos received an at-large bid to the NCAA tournament as the No. 5 seed in the East region. There, they defeated No. 12 UNC Wilmington in the first round before losing in the second round to No. 4 Florida.

== Offseason ==
=== Departures ===
Name	Number	Pos.	Height	Weight	Year	Hometown	Reason for departure
Marial Shayok	4	G	6'5"	196	Junior	Ottawa, ON	Transferred to Iowa State
Jeff Jones	24	F	6'6"	213	Senior	Charlottesville, VA	Walk-on; graduated
Jarred Reuter	31	F	6'7"	243	Sophomore	Marion, MA	Transferred to George Mason
London Perrantes	32	G	6'2"	197	Senior	Los Angeles, CA	Graduated
Darius Thompson	51	G	6'4"	196	RS junior	Murfreesboro, TN	Graduate transferred to Western Kentucky

=== Incoming transfers ===
Name	Number	Pos.	Height	Weight	Year	Hometown	Previous school
Nigel Johnson	23	G	6'1"	190	RS senior	Ashburn, VA	Transferred from Rutgers. Was eligible to play immediately, since he graduated from Rutgers.

=== 2017 recruiting class ===
College recruiting
Name	Hometown	School	Height	Weight	Commit date
Marco Anthony #44 SG	San Antonio, TX	Holmes High School	6 ft 5 in (1.96 m)	200 lb (91 kg)	Jul 18, 2016
Marco Anthony #44 SG	Recruit ratings: Scout: Rivals: 247Sports: ESPN: (79)				
Francesco Badocchi; SF	Milan, Italy	Bishop Miege (KS)	6 ft 7 in (2.01 m)	185 lb (84 kg)	Apr 30, 2017
Francesco Badocchi; SF	Recruit ratings: Scout: Rivals: 247Sports: ESPN: (NR)				
Overall recruit ranking:
Note: In many cases, Scout, Rivals, 247Sports, On3, and ESPN may conflict in their listings of height and weight.; In these cases, the average was taken. ESPN grades are on a 100-point scale.; Sources: "Virginia 2017 Basketball Commitments". Rivals.; "2017 Virginia Commits". Scout.; "2016 Player Commits". ESPN.; "Scout.com Team Recruiting Rankings". Scout.; "2017 Team Ranking". Rivals.; "Virginia 2017 Basketball Commitments". 247Sports.

=== 2018 recruiting class ===
College recruiting (2018)
Name	Hometown	School	Height	Weight	Commit date
Kody Stattmann; SG	Cairns, Queensland, Australia	St. Augustine's College	6 ft 6 in (1.98 m)	N/A	Aug 28, 2017
Kody Stattmann; SG	Recruit ratings: Scout: Rivals: 247Sports: ESPN: (NR)				
Kihei Clark; PG	Woodland Hills, CA	Taft High School	5 ft 9 in (1.75 m)	N/A	Oct 2, 2017
Kihei Clark; PG	Recruit ratings: Scout: Rivals: 247Sports: ESPN: (NR)				
Overall recruit ranking:
Note: In many cases, Scout, Rivals, 247Sports, On3, and ESPN may conflict in their listings of height and weight.; In these cases, the average was taken. ESPN grades are on a 100-point scale.; Sources: "Virginia 2018 Basketball Commitments". Rivals.; "2018 Virginia Commits". Scout.; "2016 Player Commits". ESPN.; "Scout.com Team Recruiting Rankings". Scout.; "2018 Team Ranking". Rivals.; "Virginia 2018 Basketball Commitments". 247Sports.

== Roster ==
2017–18 Virginia Cavaliers men's basketball team
Players
Coaches

Pos.	#	Name	Height	Weight	Year	Previous school	Hometown
G	0	Devon Hall (C)	6 ft 5 in (1.96 m)	211 lb (96 kg)	RS Sr	Cape Henry Collegiate School	Virginia Beach, Virginia
F	1	Francesco Badocchi (redshirt)	6 ft 7 in (2.01 m)	185 lb (84 kg)	Fr	Bishop Miege HS	Milan, Italy
G	2	Justice Bartley	6 ft 5 in (1.96 m)	212 lb (96 kg)	Jr	Montrose Christian School	Lilburn, Georgia
G	5	Kyle Guy	6 ft 2 in (1.88 m)	175 lb (79 kg)	So	Lawrence Central HS	Indianapolis, Indiana
G	10	Trevon Gross Jr.	6 ft 3 in (1.91 m)	202 lb (92 kg)	Jr	St. Benedict's Prep School	Jackson, New Jersey
G	11	Ty Jerome	6 ft 5 in (1.96 m)	200 lb (91 kg)	So	Iona Preparatory School	New Rochelle, New York
F	12	De'Andre Hunter	6 ft 7 in (2.01 m)	222 lb (101 kg)	RS Fr	Friends' Central School	Philadelphia, Pennsylvania
F	21	Isaiah Wilkins (C)	6 ft 7 in (2.01 m)	227 lb (103 kg)	Sr	Greater Atlanta Christian	Atlanta, Georgia
G	23	Nigel Johnson	6 ft 1 in (1.85 m)	182 lb (83 kg)	RS Sr	Riverdale Baptist School; Kansas State; Rutgers	Ashburn, Virginia
G	24	Marco Anthony	6 ft 4 in (1.93 m)	228 lb (103 kg)	Fr	Holmes HS	San Antonio, Texas
F	25	Mamadi Diakite	6 ft 9 in (2.06 m)	228 lb (103 kg)	RS So	Blue Ridge School	Conakry, Guinea
F	30	Jay Huff	7 ft 1 in (2.16 m)	230 lb (104 kg)	RS Fr	Voyager Academy	Durham, North Carolina
C	33	Jack Salt (C)	6 ft 10 in (2.08 m)	250 lb (113 kg)	RS Jr	Westlake Boys HS	Auckland, New Zealand
F	45	Austin Katstra (W)	6 ft 6 in (1.98 m)	214 lb (97 kg)	Fr	Albemarle HS	Charlottesville, Virginia

Head coach

- Tony Bennett (Green Bay)

Assistant coach(es)

- Ron Sanchez (SUNY-Oneonta)
- Jason Williford (Virginia)
- Brad Soderberg (UW–Stevens Point)

Strength and conditioning coach(es)

- Mike Curtis (Virginia)

Athletic trainer(s)

- Ethan Saliba (Kansas)

Legend

- (C) Team captain
- (S) Suspended
- (I) Ineligible
- (W) Walk-on
- Injured
- Current redshirt

Roster

=== Depth chart ===
Pos.	Starting 5	Bench 1	Bench 2
C	Jack Salt		Jay Huff
PF	Isaiah Wilkins	Mamadi Diakite	Austin Katstra
SF	Devon Hall	De'Andre Hunter	Justice Bartley
SG	Kyle Guy		Marco Anthony
PG	Ty Jerome	Nigel Johnson	Trevon Gross Jr.

== Schedule and results ==
Date time, TV	Rank^{#}	Opponent^{#}	Result	Record	High points	High rebounds	High assists	Site (attendance) city, state
Non-conference regular season
Nov 10, 2017*; 7:00 pm, ACCN Extra		UNC Greensboro	W 60–48	1–0	16 – Guy	8 – Wilkins	3 – Guy	John Paul Jones Arena (13,855); Charlottesville, VA
Nov 13, 2017*; 7:00 pm, ACCN Extra		Austin Peay; NIT Season Tip-Off Campus-Site Game	W 93–49	2–0	19 – Hall	8 – Wilkins	4 – Anthony	John Paul Jones Arena (12,995); Charlottesville, VA
Nov 17, 2017*; 4:00 pm, CBSSN		at VCU	W 76–67	3–0	29 – Guy	8 – Wilkins	7 – Jerome	Siegel Center (7,637); Richmond, VA
Nov 19, 2017*; 1:00 pm, RSN		Monmouth; NIT Season Tip-Off Campus-Site Game	W 73–53	4–0	23 – Hunter	8 – Hunter	3 – Tied	John Paul Jones Arena (13,472); Charlottesville, VA
Nov 23, 2017*; 4:00 pm, ESPNU		vs. Vanderbilt; NIT Season Tip-Off Semifinals	W 68–42	5–0	18 – Guy	5 – Diakite	4 – 3 Tied	Barclays Center; Brooklyn, NY
Nov 24, 2017*; 7:30 pm, ESPNU		vs. Rhode Island; NIT Season Tip-Off Championship	W 70–55	6–0	19 – Wilkins	8 – Salt	3 – Tied	Barclays Center; Brooklyn, NY
Nov 27, 2017*; 9:00 pm, ESPN2	No. 18	Wisconsin; ACC–Big Ten Challenge	W 49–37	7–0	17 – Guy	10 – Wilkins	2 – Tied	John Paul Jones Arena (13,911); Charlottesville, VA
Dec 2, 2017*; 12:00 pm, ACCN Extra	No. 18	Lehigh	W 75–54	8–0	21 – Guy	6 – Wilkins	8 – Johnson	John Paul Jones Arena (13,594); Charlottesville, VA
Dec 5, 2017*; 7:00 pm, ESPNU	No. 15	at No. 18 West Virginia	L 61–68	8–1	19 – Hall	5 – Wilkins	6 – Hall	WVU Coliseum (12,816); Morgantown, WV
Dec 16, 2017*; 2:00 pm, ACCN Extra	No. 16	Davidson	W 80–60	9–1	22 – Johnson	8 – Wilkins	5 – Hall	John Paul Jones Arena (13,910); Charlottesville, VA
Dec 19, 2017*; 7:00 pm, ACCN Extra	No. 13	Savannah State	W 78–47	10–1	17 – Jerome	7 – Wilkins	5 – Johnson	John Paul Jones Arena (13,597); Charlottesville, VA
Dec 22, 2017*; 7:00 pm, ACCN Extra	No. 13	Hampton	W 82–48	11–1	15 – Guy	9 – Wilkins	4 – Johnson	John Paul Jones Arena (13,328); Charlottesville, VA
ACC regular season
Dec 30, 2017; 2:00 pm, RSN	No. 9	Boston College	W 59–58	12–1 (1–0)	31 – Jerome	14 – Wilkins	3 – Hall	John Paul Jones Arena (14,538); Charlottesville, VA
Jan 3, 2018; 9:00 pm, ACCN	No. 8	at Virginia Tech; Commonwealth Clash	W 78–52	13–1 (2–0)	14 – Hunter	7 – Tied	5 – Jerome	Cassell Coliseum (5,945); Blacksburg, VA
Jan 6, 2018; 1:00 pm, ESPN	No. 8	No. 12 North Carolina	W 61–49	14–1 (3–0)	16 – Hall	7 – Hunter	7 – Hall	John Paul Jones Arena (14,401); Charlottesville, VA
Jan 9, 2018; 8:00 pm, ACCN	No. 3	Syracuse	W 68–61	15–1 (4–0)	22 – Guy	9 – Wilkins	8 – Hall	John Paul Jones Arena (13,625); Charlottesville, VA
Jan 14, 2018; 6:00 pm, ESPNU	No. 3	NC State	W 68–51	16–1 (5–0)	25 – Hall	6 – Wilkins	6 – Jerome	John Paul Jones Arena (14,317); Charlottesville, VA
Jan 18, 2018; 8:00 pm, ACCN	No. 2	at Georgia Tech	W 64–48	17–1 (6–0)	17 – Hunter	7 – Hunter	5 – Jerome	McCamish Pavilion (8,600); Atlanta, GA
Jan 21, 2018; 6:00 pm, ESPNU	No. 2	at Wake Forest	W 59–49	18–1 (7–0)	17 – Guy	7 – Hall	4 – Guy	LJVM Coliseum (10,014); Winston-Salem, NC
Jan 23, 2018; 7:00 pm, RSN	No. 2	No. 18 Clemson	W 61–36	19–1 (8–0)	14 – Hall	5 – Tied	3 – Jerome	John Paul Jones Arena (14,149); Charlottesville, VA
Jan 27, 2018; 2:00 pm, CBS	No. 2	at No. 4 Duke	W 65–63	20–1 (9–0)	17 – Guy	8 – Hall	7 – Jerome	Cameron Indoor Stadium (9,314); Durham, NC
Jan 31, 2018; 7:00 pm, ESPN2	No. 2	Louisville	W 74–64	21–1 (10–0)	22 – Guy	10 – Wilkins	9 – Jerome	John Paul Jones Arena (14,310); Charlottesville, VA
Feb 3, 2018; 4:00 pm, ACCN	No. 2	at Syracuse	W 59–44	22–1 (11–0)	15 – Hunter	6 – Wilkins	6 – Jerome	Carrier Dome (27,083); Syracuse, NY
Feb 7, 2018; 7:00 pm, RSN	No. 2	at Florida State	W 59–55	23–1 (12–0)	17 – Hall	6 – Diakite	3 – Hall	Donald L. Tucker Civic Center (10,657); Tallahassee, FL
Feb 10, 2018; 6:15 pm, ESPN	No. 2	Virginia Tech; Commonwealth Clash/College Gameday	L 60–61 ^{OT}	23–2 (12–1)	16 – Hall	8 – Jerome	4 – Jerome	John Paul Jones Arena (14,593); Charlottesville, VA
Feb 13, 2018; 9:00 pm, ESPN	No. 1	at Miami (FL)	W 59–50	24–2 (13–1)	22 – Hunter	7 – Salt	7 – Jerome	Watsco Center (7,333); Coral Gables, FL
Feb 21, 2018; 7:00 pm, ESPN2	No. 1	Georgia Tech	W 65–54	25–2 (14–1)	18 – Jerome	6 – Salt	5 – Jerome	John Paul Jones Arena (13,873); Charlottesville, VA
Feb 24, 2018; 4:00 pm, ESPNU	No. 1	at Pittsburgh	W 66–37	26–2 (15–1)	14 – Hunter	10 – Hunter	4 – Hall	Petersen Events Center (6,534); Pittsburgh, PA
Mar 1, 2018; 8:00 pm, ACCN	No. 1	at Louisville	W 67–66	27–2 (16–1)	21 – Jerome	9 – Hall	4 – Hall	KFC Yum! Center (19,413); Louisville, KY
Mar 3, 2018; 4:00 pm, ACCN	No. 1	Notre Dame	W 62–57	28–2 (17–1)	17 – Hall	6 – Tied	6 – Hall	John Paul Jones Arena (14,205); Charlottesville, VA
ACC Tournament
Mar 8, 2018; 12:00 pm, ESPN/ACCN	(1) No. 1	vs. (9) Louisville; Quarterfinals	W 75–58	29–2	19 – Guy	7 – Guy	5 – Hall	Barclays Center (17,732); Brooklyn, NY
Mar 9, 2018; 7:00 pm, ESPN/ACCN	(1) No. 1	vs. (4) No. 19 Clemson; Semifinals	W 64–58	30–2	15 – Guy	8 – Salt	10 – Jerome	Barclays Center (18,157); Brooklyn, NY
Mar 10, 2018; 8:30 pm, ESPN/ACCN	(1) No. 1	vs. (6) No. 12 North Carolina; Championship	W 71–63	31–2	16 – Guy	6 – Jerome	6 – Jerome	Barclays Center (18,157); Brooklyn, NY
NCAA tournament
Mar 16, 2018*; 9:20 pm, TNT	(1 S) No. 1	vs. (16 S) UMBC; First Round	L 54–74	31–3	15 – Tied	5 – Wilkins	2 – Jerome	Spectrum Center (17,943); Charlotte, NC
*Non-conference game. ^{#}Rankings from AP Poll. (#) Tournament seedings in parentheses. S=South region. All times are in Eastern Time.

== Rankings ==
Ranking movements Legend: ██ Increase in ranking ██ Decrease in ranking RV = Received votes ( ) = First-place votes
	Week																			
Poll	Pre	1	2	3	4	5	6	7	8	9	10	11	12	13	14	15	16	17	18	Final
AP	RV	RV	RV	18	15	16	13	9	8	3	2 (1)	2 (1)	2 (1)	2 (17)	2 (16)	1 (42)	1 (48)	1 (65)	1 (65)	Not released
Coaches	RV	RV^	25	15	12	16	14	9	8	3	2	2	2 (8)	2 (8)	3 (5)	2 (3)	1 (17)	1 (32)	1 (32)	5

*AP does not release post-NCAA tournament rankings.
Coaches did not release a Week 2 poll at the same time the AP did.
