= 2017–18 Clemson Tigers men's basketball team =

American college basketball season

2017–18 Clemson Tigers men's basketball
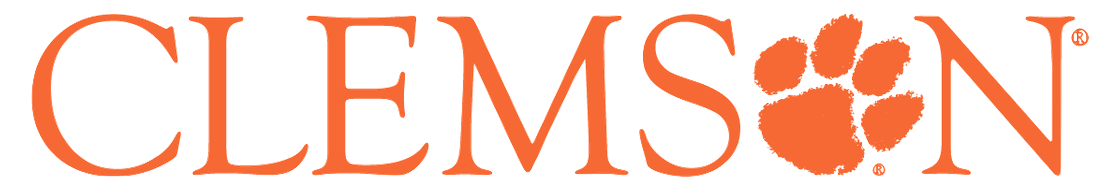

NCAA tournament, Sweet Sixteen
- Conference: Atlantic Coast Conference

Ranking
- Coaches: No. 15
- AP: No. 20
- Record: 25–10 (11–7 ACC)
- Head coach: Brad Brownell (8th season)
- Assistant coaches: Antonio Reynolds-Dean (1st season); Dick Bender (2nd season); Steve Smith (6th season)
- Home arena: Littlejohn Coliseum

2017–18 ACC men's basketball standings
	Conf.				Overall
Team	W		L	PCT	W		L	PCT
No. 1 Virginia †	17	–	1	.944	31	–	3	.912
No. 9 Duke	13	–	5	.722	29	–	8	.784
No. 22 Miami (FL)	11	–	7	.611	22	–	10	.688
No. 20 Clemson	11	–	7	.611	25	–	10	.714
NC State	11	–	7	.611	21	–	12	.636
No. 10 North Carolina	11	–	7	.611	26	–	11	.703
Virginia Tech	10	–	8	.556	21	–	12	.636
Florida State	9	–	9	.500	23	–	12	.657
Louisville	9	–	9	.500	22	–	14	.611
Notre Dame	8	–	10	.444	21	–	15	.583
Syracuse	8	–	10	.444	23	–	14	.622
Boston College	7	–	11	.389	19	–	16	.543
Georgia Tech	6	–	12	.333	13	–	19	.406
Wake Forest	4	–	14	.222	11	–	20	.355
Pittsburgh	0	–	18	.000	8	–	24	.250
† 2018 ACC tournament winner Rankings from AP poll

The 2017–18 Clemson Tigers men's basketball team represented Clemson University during the 2017–18 NCAA Division I men's basketball season. Led by eighth-year head coach Brad Brownell, the Tigers played their home games at Littlejohn Coliseum in Clemson, South Carolina as members of the Atlantic Coast Conference. They finished the season 25–10, 11–7 in ACC play to finish in four-way tie for third place. They defeated Boston College in the quarterfinals of the ACC tournament before losing in the semifinals to Virginia. They received an at-large bid to the NCAA tournament where they defeated New Mexico State and Auburn to advance to the Sweet Sixteen where they lost to Kansas. The Tigers 25 wins tied the most in program history and their 11 conference wins were the most in program history at the time.

== Previous season ==
The Tigers finished the 2016–17 season 17–16, 6–12 in ACC play to finish in 12th place. They lost in the second round of the ACC tournament to Duke. They received an invitation to the National Invitation Tournament where they lost in the first round to Oakland.

== Offseason ==
On June 19, 2017, the Tigers announced the signing of Antonio Reynolds-Dean as an assistant coach. Dean replaces longtime assistant Mike Winiecki, who left the program in April.

=== Departures ===
Name	Number	Pos.	Height	Weight	Year	Hometown	Reason for departure
Legend Robertin	00	C	7'0"	260	Junior	London, England	Transferred to Nicholls State University
Ty Hudson	1	G	6'1"	200	Sophomore	Mableton, GA	Transferred to Jacksonville St.
Jaron Blossomgame	5	F	6'7"	220	(redshirt) Senior	Alpharetta, GA	Graduated/2017 NBA draft
Avry Holmes	12	G	6'2"	195	Graduate Student	Salem, OR	Graduated
Riley McGillan	44	G	6'0"	170	Graduate Student	Fort Mill, SC	Graduated
Sidy Djitte	50	C	6'10"	240	Senior	Dakar, Senegal	Graduated

=== Incoming transfers ===
Name	Number	Pos.	Height	Weight	Year	Hometown	Previous school
Mark Donnal	5	C	6'9"	240	Graduate Student	Monclova, OH	Graduate transfer from Michigan. Will play immediately in the 2017–18 season under NCAA transfer rules.

=== 2017 recruiting class ===
College recruiting information
Name	Hometown	School	Height	Weight	Commit date
Malik William #26 PF	Orlando, FL	The First Academy	6 ft 7 in (2.01 m)	200 lb (91 kg)	Jul 27, 2016
Malik William #26 PF	Recruit ratings: Scout: Rivals: 247Sports: ESPN: (82)				
Aamir Simms #27 PF	Saint George, VA	Blue Ridge School	6 ft 8 in (2.03 m)	200 lb (91 kg)	Sep 22, 2016
Aamir Simms #27 PF	Recruit ratings: Scout: Rivals: 247Sports: ESPN: (82)				
A.J. Oliver #38 SG	Central, SC	D.W. Daniel High School	6 ft 5 in (1.96 m)	185 lb (84 kg)	Dec 1, 2015
A.J. Oliver #38 SG	Recruit ratings: Scout: Rivals: 247Sports: ESPN: (80)				
Clyde Trapp Jr. SG	Hopkins, SC	Lower Richland High School	6 ft 4 in (1.93 m)	188 lb (85 kg)	Nov 9, 2016
Clyde Trapp Jr. SG	Recruit ratings: Scout: Rivals: 247Sports: ESPN: (N/A)				
Overall recruit ranking: Scout: NA Rivals: NA ESPN: NA
Note: In many cases, Scout, Rivals, 247Sports, On3, and ESPN may conflict in their listings of height and weight.; In these cases, the average was taken. ESPN grades are on a 100-point scale.; Sources: "2017 Clemson Basketball Commitment List". Rivals.; "Clemson Tigers". ESPN.; "2017 Team Ranking". Rivals.

=== 2018 recruiting class ===
College recruiting information (2018)
Name	Hometown	School	Height	Weight	Commit date
John Newman III; SG	Greensboro, NC	Greensboro Day	6 ft 6 in (1.98 m)	175 lb (79 kg)	Jun 23, 2017
John Newman III; SG	Recruit ratings: Scout: Rivals: 247Sports: ESPN: (81)				
Hunter Tyson; SF	Monroe, NC	Piedmont Community Charter	6 ft 7 in (2.01 m)	180 lb (82 kg)	Sep 25, 2017
Hunter Tyson; SF	Recruit ratings: Scout: Rivals: 247Sports: ESPN: (80)				
Trey Jemison; PF	Birmingham, AL	Hoover High School	6 ft 11 in (2.11 m)	245 lb (111 kg)	Oct 25, 2017
Trey Jemison; PF	Recruit ratings: Scout: Rivals: 247Sports: ESPN: (N/A)				
Overall recruit ranking: Scout: NA Rivals: NA ESPN: NA
Note: In many cases, Scout, Rivals, 247Sports, On3, and ESPN may conflict in their listings of height and weight.; In these cases, the average was taken. ESPN grades are on a 100-point scale.; Sources: "2018 Clemson Basketball Commitment List". Rivals.; "Clemson Tigers". ESPN.; "2018 Team Ranking". Rivals.

== Roster ==
2017–18 Clemson Tigers men's basketball team
Players
Coaches

Pos.	#	Name	Height	Weight	Year	Hometown
G	0	Clyde Trapp	6 ft 4 in (1.93 m)	192 lb (87 kg)	Fr	Columbia, South Carolina
G	2	Marcquise Reed	6 ft 3 in (1.91 m)	189 lb (86 kg)	RS Jr	Landover, Maryland
G	3	Lyles Davis (W)	5 ft 11 in (1.8 m)	160 lb (73 kg)	Jr	Charleston, South Carolina
G	4	Shelton Mitchell	6 ft 3 in (1.91 m)	194 lb (88 kg)	RS Jr	Waxhaw, North Carolina
F/C	5	Mark Donnal	6 ft 9 in (2.06 m)	240 lb (109 kg)	GS	Monclova, Ohio
G	10	Gabe DeVoe	6 ft 3 in (1.91 m)	207 lb (94 kg)	Sr	Shelby, North Carolina
G	11	Isaac Fields (W)	6 ft 1 in (1.85 m)	180 lb (82 kg)	So	Pewee Valley, Kentucky
F	14	Elijah Thomas	6 ft 9 in (2.06 m)	237 lb (108 kg)	Jr	Lancaster, Texas
F	20	Malik William	6 ft 7 in (2.01 m)	226 lb (103 kg)	Fr	Orlando, Florida
G	21	Anthony Oliver II	6 ft 5 in (1.96 m)	190 lb (86 kg)	RS Fr	Clemson, South Carolina
G	22	Scott Spencer	6 ft 6 in (1.98 m)	190 lb (86 kg)	So	Suffolk, Virginia
F	24	David Skara	6 ft 8 in (2.03 m)	208 lb (94 kg)	RS Jr	Zadar, Croatia
F	25	Aamir Simms	6 ft 8 in (2.03 m)	237 lb (108 kg)	RS Fr	Palmyra, Virginia
F	32	Donte Grantham	6 ft 8 in (2.03 m)	215 lb (98 kg)	Sr	Martinsburg, West Virginia

Head coach

- Brad Brownell (DePauw)

Assistant coach(es)

- Antonio Reynolds Dean (Rhode Island)
- Dick Bender (McDaniel)
- Steve Smith (Morgan State)

Legend

- (C) Team captain
- (S) Suspended
- (I) Ineligible
- (W) Walk-on
- Injured
- Current redshirt

Roster
Last update: 6/19/2017

== Schedule and results ==
Date time, TV	Rank^{#}	Opponent^{#}	Result	Record	High points	High rebounds	High assists	Site (attendance) city, state
Exhibition
Nov 2, 2017*; 7:00 pm		Augusta	W 80–56		18 – Grantham	9 – Thomas	5 – Devoe	Littlejohn Coliseum; Clemson, SC
Nov 5, 2017*; 12:30 pm		Tennessee; Exhibition for Hurricane Relief	L 67–71		25 – Reed	8 – Reed	3 – Grantham	Littlejohn Coliseum (4,112); Clemson, SC
Non-conference regular season
Nov 10, 2017*; 7:00 pm, ACCN Extra		Western Carolina	W 85–57	1–0	14 – Grantham	6 – Simms	6 – Mitchell	Littlejohn Coliseum (8,188); Clemson, SC
Nov 12, 2017*; 2:00 pm, ACCN Extra		North Carolina A&T	W 87–63	2–0	17 – Grantham	12 – Grantham	6 – Mitchell	Littlejohn Coliseum (5,528); Clemson, SC
Nov 16, 2017*; 5:00 pm, ESPN2		vs. Ohio; Charleston Classic quarterfinal	W 81–76	3–0	20 – Grantham	15 – Thomas	5 – Mitchell	TD Arena (3,175); Charleston, SC
Nov 17, 2017*; 9:30 pm, ESPNU		vs. Hofstra; Charleston Classic semifinal	W 78–59	4–0	22 – Grantham	11 – Reed	6 – Reed	TD Arena (3,087); Charleston, SC
Nov 19, 2017*; 9:30 pm, ESPN2		vs. Temple; Charleston Classic final	L 60–67	4–1	16 – Mitchell	9 – Grantham	4 – Tied	TD Arena (2,263); Charleston, SC
Nov 24, 2017*; 3:00 pm, ACCN Extra		Texas Southern	W 84–77	5–1	26 – Thomas	16 – Thomas	3 – 4 Tied	Littlejohn Coliseum (5,526); Clemson, SC
Nov 29, 2017*; 7:00 pm, ESPN2		at Ohio State; ACC–Big Ten Challenge	W 79–65	6–1	22 – Reed	8 – Thomas	6 – Tied	Value City Arena (17,189); Columbus, OH
Dec 3, 2017*; 3:00 pm, ACCN Extra		UNC Asheville	W 83–52	7–1	19 – Reed	10 – Grantham	6 – Mitchell	Littlejohn Coliseum (5,932); Clemson, SC
Dec 9, 2017*; 3:00 pm, ACCN Extra		Samford	W 81–59	8–1	20 – Tied	11 – Thomas	5 – Tied	Littlejohn Coliseum (7,434); Clemson, SC
Dec 16, 2017*; 4:30 pm, FS2		vs. No. 22 Florida; Orange Bowl Basketball Classic	W 71–69	9–1	22 – Reed	10 – Thomas	6 – Reed	BB&T Center (9,152); Sunrise, FL
Dec 19, 2017*; 7:00 pm, ESPN2		South Carolina; Rivalry	W 64–48	10–1	25 – Reed	7 – Grantham	3 – Reed	Littlejohn Coliseum (8,031); Clemson, SC
Dec 22, 2017*; 3:00 pm, ACCN Extra		Louisiana	W 89–60	11–1	17 – Grantham	10 – Grantham	6 – Mitchell	Littlejohn Coliseum (6,847); Clemson, SC
ACC regular season
Dec 30, 2017; 4:00 pm, ACCRSN		NC State	W 78–62	12–1 (1–0)	18 – Reed	10 – Thomas	5 – Reed	Littlejohn Coliseum (9,000); Clemson, SC
Jan 3, 2018; 7:00 pm, ACCRSN	No. 25	at Boston College	W 74–70	13–1 (2–0)	23 – Grantham	14 – Grantham	5 – Grantham	Conte Forum (3,911); Chestnut Hill, MA
Jan 6, 2018; 12:00 pm, ACCN	No. 25	Louisville	W 74–69 ^{OT}	14–1 (3–0)	24 – Reed	11 – Grantham	3 – Tied	Littlejohn Coliseum (7,594); Clemson, SC
Jan 11, 2018; 9:00 pm, ESPN	No. 19	at NC State	L 77–78	14–2 (3–1)	17 – Reed	10 – Devoe	3 – 3 Tied	PNC Arena (17,526); Raleigh, NC
Jan 13, 2018; 3:00 pm, ESPNU	No. 19	No. 18 Miami (FL)	W 72–63	15–2 (4–1)	18 – Grantham	7 – Reed	7 – Mitchell	Littlejohn Coliseum (9,000); Clemson, SC
Jan 16, 2018; 7:00 pm, ACCRSN	No. 20	at No. 15 North Carolina	L 79–87	15–3 (4–2)	21 – Reed	6 – Thomas	5 – Grantham	Dean E. Smith Center (20,155); Chapel Hill, NC
Jan 20, 2018; 4:00 pm, ESPN	No. 20	Notre Dame	W 67–58	16–3 (5–2)	17 – Devoe	7 – Tied	5 – Mitchell	Littlejohn Coliseum (9,000); Clemson, SC
Jan 23, 2018; 7:00 pm, ACCRSN	No. 18	at No. 2 Virginia	L 36–61	16–4 (5–3)	11 – Devoe	6 – Simms	2 – Mitchell	John Paul Jones Arena (14,149); Charlottesville, VA
Jan 28, 2018; 6:00 pm, ESPNU	No. 18	at Georgia Tech	W 72–70	17–4 (6–3)	25 – Devoe	5 – 3 Tied	11 – Reed	McCamish Pavilion (8,600); Atlanta, GA
Jan 30, 2018; 7:00 pm, ESPN	No. 20	No. 19 North Carolina	W 82–78	18–4 (7–3)	20 – Reed	8 – Reed	5 – Reed	Littlejohn Coliseum (9,000); Clemson, SC
Feb 3, 2018; 2:00 pm, ACCRSN	No. 20	at Wake Forest	W 75–67	19–4 (8–3)	24 – DeVoe	7 – Tied	2 – 3 Tied	LJVM Coliseum (10,468); Winston-Salem, NC
Feb 8, 2018; 7:00 pm, ACCRSN	No. 16	Pittsburgh	W 72–48	20–4 (9–3)	25 – DeVoe	11 – Thomas	7 – Reed	Littlejohn Coliseum (7,573); Clemson, SC
Feb 14, 2018; 7:00 pm, ACCRSN	No. 11	at Florida State	L 79–81 ^{OT}	20–5 (9–4)	23 – Reed	9 – Thomas	4 – Reed	Donald L. Tucker Center (9,131); Tallahassee, FL
Feb 18, 2018; 1:00 pm, ACCN	No. 11	No. 12 Duke	L 57–66	20–6 (9–5)	13 – 3 Tied	15 – Thomas	5 – Reed	Littlejohn Coliseum (9,000); Clemson, SC
Feb 21, 2018; 7:00 pm, ACCRSN	No. 15	at Virginia Tech	L 58–65	20–7 (9–6)	28 – Reed	10 – Tied	3 – Tied	Cassell Coliseum (9,275); Blacksburg, VA
Feb 24, 2018; 3:00 pm, ACCN	No. 15	Georgia Tech	W 75–67	21–7 (10–6)	25 – DeVoe	6 – Tied	5 – Reed	Littlejohn Coliseum (9,000); Clemson, SC
Feb 28, 2018; 7:00 pm, ESPNU	No. 18	Florida State	W 76–63	22–7 (11–6)	22 – Reed	8 – Thomas	5 – Reed	Littlejohn Coliseum (7,242); Clemson, SC
Mar 3, 2018; 2:00 pm, ACCN	No. 18	at Syracuse	L 52–55	22–8 (11–7)	21 – Reed	9 – DeVoe	5 – DeVoe	Carrier Dome (28,670); Syracuse, NY
ACC tournament
Mar 8, 2018; 2:00 pm, ESPN	(4) No. 19	vs. (12) Boston College; Quarterfinals	W 90–82	23–8	25 – DeVoe	12 – Thomas	4 – Tied	Barclays Center (17,732); Brooklyn, NY
Mar 9, 2018; 7:00 pm, ESPN	(4) No. 19	vs. (1) No. 1 Virginia; Semifinals	L 58–64	23–9	18 – Mitchell	7 – Thomas	3 – DeVoe	Barclays Center (17,732); Brooklyn, NY
NCAA tournament
Mar 16, 2018*; 9:57 pm, truTV	(5 MW) No. 20	vs. (12 MW) New Mexico State; First Round	W 79–68	24–9	23 – Mitchell	10 – Thomas	5 – Mitchell	Viejas Arena (10,092); San Diego, CA
Mar 18, 2018*; 7:10 pm, TBS	(5 MW) No. 20	vs. (4 MW) No. 19 Auburn; Second Round	W 84–53	25–9	22 – DeVoe	11 – Thomas	6 – Mitchell	Viejas Arena (11,628); San Diego, CA
Mar 23, 2018*; 7:07 pm, CBS	(5 MW) No. 20	vs. (1 MW) No. 4 Kansas; Sweet Sixteen	L 76–80	25–10	31 – DeVoe	9 – DeVoe	3 – DeVoe	CenturyLink Center Omaha (17,399); Omaha, NE
*Non-conference game. ^{#}Rankings from AP Poll. (#) Tournament seedings in parentheses. MW=Midwest. All times are in Eastern Time.

== Rankings ==
Ranking movements Legend: ██ Increase in ranking ██ Decrease in ranking — = Not ranked RV = Received votes
	Week																			
Poll	Pre	1	2	3	4	5	6	7	8	9	10	11	12	13	14	15	16	17	18	Final
AP	—	—	—	—	—	—	RV	RV	25	19	20	18	20	16	11	15	18	19	20	Not released
Coaches	—	—	—	—	—	—	RV	RV	25	17	18	17	20	15	12	17	18	20	18	15

*AP does not release post-NCAA tournament rankings

== See also ==
- 2017–18 Clemson Tigers women's basketball team
