= Malik Ellison =

American basketball player (born 1996)

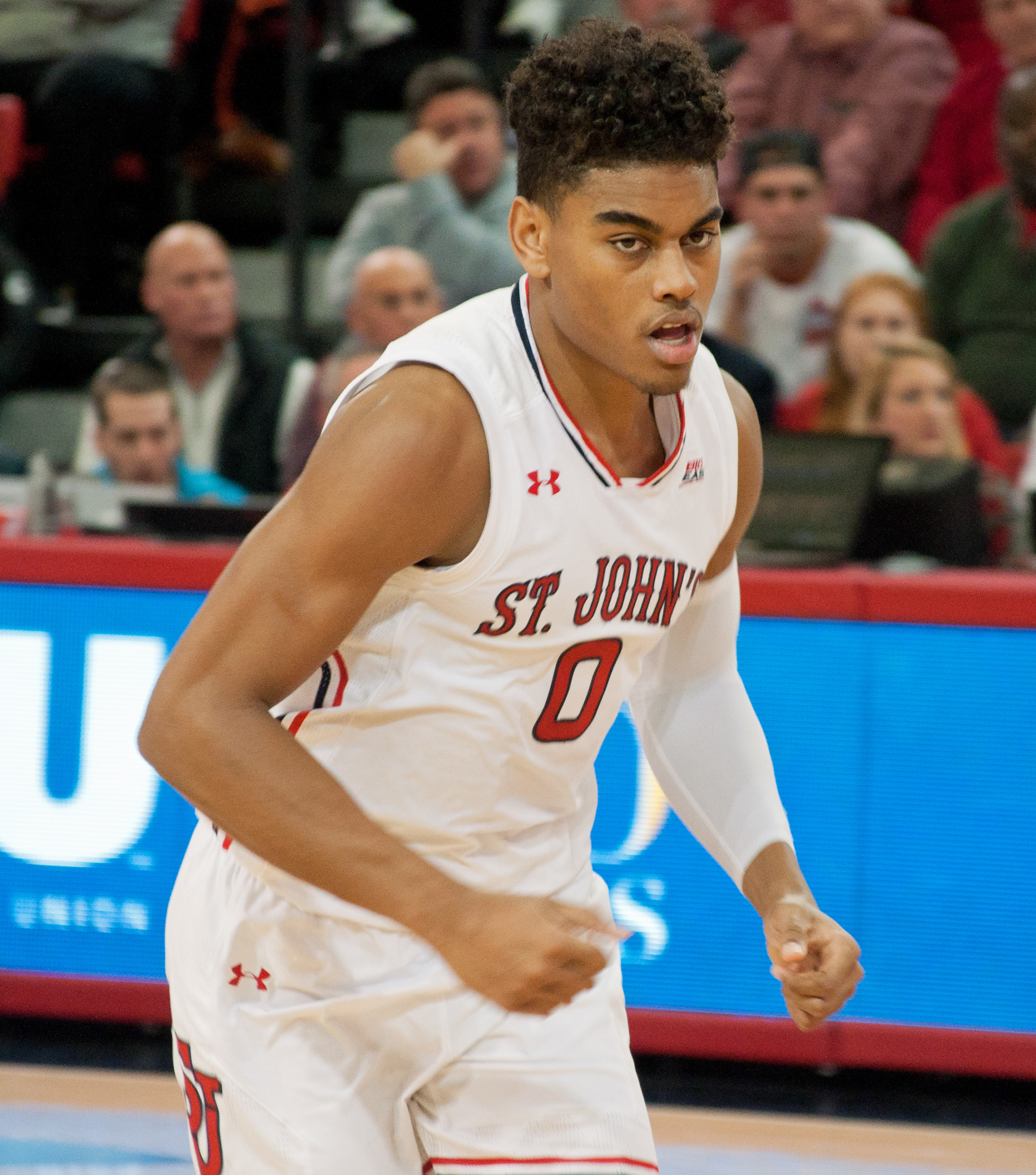
- Ellison in 2017

Personal information
- Born: August 17, 1996 (age 30) Washington, D.C., U.S.
- Listed height: 6 ft 6 in (1.98 m)
- Listed weight: 215 lb (98 kg)

Career information
- High school: Life Center Academy (Burlington, New Jersey)
- College: St. John's (2015–2017); Pittsburgh (2018–2019); Hartford (2019–2020)
- NBA draft: 2020: undrafted
- Playing career: 2021–2023
- Position: Shooting guard

Career history
- 2021–2023: College Park Skyhawks
- 2023: Kauhajoen Karhu

Career highlights
- First-team All-America East (2020)
- Stats at NBA.com
- Stats at Basketball Reference

Malik Ellison (born August 17, 1996) is an American former professional basketball player He played college basketball for the St. John's Red Storm, the Pittsburgh Panthers, and the Hartford Hawks.

== Early life ==
Raised in Voorhees Township, New Jersey, Ellison was nicknamed “Missile,” and attended Life Center Academy in Burlington. He missed the beginning of his senior season with a broken tibia, not returning to the court until December 2014. In January 2015, Ellison scored 28 points and tallied in a 60–54 win against Orangeville Prep at the Spalding Hoophall Classic. As a senior, he averaged 20 points, 7 rebounds and 4 assists per game. Ellison committed to playing college basketball for St. John's, choosing the Red Storm over offers from Maryland, Seton Hall, Temple, Xavier and South Carolina.

== College career ==
Ellison started nine games as a freshman and averaged 7.3 points, 2.5 rebounds and 2.6 assists per game. As a sophomore, Ellison averaged 7.4 points and 2.5 assists per game. He transferred to Pittsburgh after the season. Ellison made 16 starts as a junior and averaged 5.8 points, 3.8 rebounds and 1.2 assists per game. He provided energetic defense on the perimeter but struggled with his shooting, hitting 44.5 percent of his attempts from the floor, and his production declined during Atlantic Coast Conference play. Following the season, he transferred to Hartford as a graduate transfer. Ellison missed the start of his senior season due to a sprained ankle. On January 25, 2020, he scored a career-high 31 points and had 12 rebounds in a 62–48 win over Albany. As a senior, Ellison averaged 18.7 points and 9.7 rebounds per game, and scored in double figures in all but three games. He was named to the First Team All-America East as well as receiving NABC All-District 1 honors.

== Professional career ==
=== College Park Skyhawks (2021–2023) ===
After going undrafted in the 2020 NBA draft, Ellison signed his first professional contract with BC Kolín of the Czech National Basketball League on September 29, 2021. However, he didn't play for them because he joined the College Park Skyhawks of the NBA G League the next month. In 14 games, he averaged 10.5 points and 4.9 rebounds in 29.7 minutes per game (.505 FG%, .423 3FG%, .640 FT%).

On December 25, 2021, Ellison signed a 10-day contract with the Atlanta Hawks but did not appear in a game for the team during this stint. On January 4, 2022, Ellison was reacquired by the Skyhawks.

On September 16, 2022, Ellison signed with Atlanta, but was waived on October 9. On October 22, he re-signed with College Park.

=== Kauhajoen Karhu (2023) ===
On August 28, 2023, Ellison signed with Kauhajoen Karhu of the Korisliiga.

On October 30, 2023, Ellison joined the Santa Cruz Warriors, but was waived on November 18 without playing for them.

== Career statistics ==
Legend
GP	Games played	GS	Games started	MPG	Minutes per game
FG%	Field goal percentage	3P%	3-point field goal percentage	FT%	Free throw percentage
RPG	Rebounds per game	APG	Assists per game	SPG	Steals per game
BPG	Blocks per game	PPG	Points per game	**Bold**	Career high

=== College ===
Year	Team	GP	GS	MPG	FG%	3P%	FT%	RPG	APG	SPG	BPG	PPG
2015–16	St. John's	24	9	21.3	.369	.318	**.653**	2.5	**2.6**	.4	.1	7.3
2016–17	St. John's	**33**	**26**	24.8	.419	**.341**	.595	3.3	2.5	**.9**	.2	7.4
2017–18	Pittsburgh	Redshirt										
2018–19	Pittsburgh	31	16	21.0	.445	.188	.541	3.8	1.2	.6	.3	5.8
2019–20	Hartford	23	23	**35.0**	**.514**	.154	.630	**9.7**	1.7	.8	**1.1**	**18.7**
Career		111	74	25.1	.455	.304	.612	4.6	2.0	.7	.4	9.3

== Personal life ==
Ellison is the son of Pervis Ellison, who was the top pick in the 1989 NBA draft. His mother Timi, ran track in college. Ellison's sister Aja played basketball at Maryland and helped the team reach the Final Four. Another sister, Seattle, attended Howard University on a track scholarship.
