= 2018 ACC men's basketball tournament =

- 2018 ACC Tournament logo
- Classification: Division I
- Season: 2017–18
- Teams: 15
- Site: Barclays Center; Brooklyn, New York
- Champions: Virginia (3rd title)
- Winning coach: Tony Bennett (2nd title)
- MVP: Kyle Guy (Virginia)
- Attendance: 82,390
- Television: ESPN, ESPN2, ESPNU, ACCN

2017–18 ACC men's basketball standings
	Conf.				Overall
Team	W		L	PCT	W		L	PCT
No. 1 Virginia †	17	–	1	.944	31	–	3	.912
No. 9 Duke	13	–	5	.722	29	–	8	.784
No. 22 Miami (FL)	11	–	7	.611	22	–	10	.688
No. 20 Clemson	11	–	7	.611	25	–	10	.714
NC State	11	–	7	.611	21	–	12	.636
No. 10 North Carolina	11	–	7	.611	26	–	11	.703
Virginia Tech	10	–	8	.556	21	–	12	.636
Florida State	9	–	9	.500	23	–	12	.657
Louisville	9	–	9	.500	22	–	14	.611
Notre Dame	8	–	10	.444	21	–	15	.583
Syracuse	8	–	10	.444	23	–	14	.622
Boston College	7	–	11	.389	19	–	16	.543
Georgia Tech	6	–	12	.333	13	–	19	.406
Wake Forest	4	–	14	.222	11	–	20	.355
Pittsburgh	0	–	18	.000	8	–	24	.250
† 2018 ACC tournament winner Rankings from AP poll

The 2018 ACC men's basketball tournament was the postseason men's basketball tournament for the Atlantic Coast Conference held at Barclays Center in Brooklyn, New York, from March 6 to 10, 2018. It was the 65th annual edition of the tournament, and the second year in a row being held at Barclays Center. The Virginia Cavaliers entered the tournament as the top seed, with a 17–1 conference record (28–2 overall) under the guidance of Tony Bennett. UVA also began the tournament unanimously ranked number 1 in the country in both major polls.

The Cavaliers defeated Louisville 75–58 and Clemson 64–58 to secure a place in the tournament championship game. They defeated North Carolina 71–63 in the championship game to become tournament champion. Sophomore guard Kyle Guy was named Tournament MVP. Games were shown on over-the-air television in local media markets by the syndicated ACCN and simulcast nationally on various ESPN cable networks.

Both the Virginia–North Carolina title game and Duke–North Carolina semifinal game set the Barclays Center attendance record for college basketball games, and conference leadership vowed to return the ACC Tournament to New York in the near future.

== Seeds ==
All 15 ACC teams participated in the tournament. Teams were seeded by record within the conference, with a tiebreaker system to seed teams with identical conference records. The tournament was held over five consecutive days. Teams ranked 10–15 played on the first day; teams ranked 5–9 entered the bracket on the second day, with teams ranked 1–4 entering on the third day (quarterfinals). The semifinals were played on the fourth day, and the finals on the last day.

Seed	School	Conference Record	Tiebreaker
1	Virginia	17–1	
2	Duke	13–5	
3	Miami	11–7	2–1 vs Clem/NCST/UNC
4	Clemson	11–7	3–2 vs Miami/NCST/UNC
5	NC State	11–7	1–0 vs Duke
6	North Carolina	11–7	1–1 vs Duke
7	Virginia Tech	10–8	
8	Florida State	9–9	3–3 vs Miami/Clem/NCST/UNC
9	Louisville	9–9	0–4 vs Miami/Clem/NCST/UNC
10	Notre Dame	8–10	1–0 vs Syracuse
11	Syracuse	8–10	0–1 vs ND
12	Boston College	7–11	
13	Georgia Tech	6–12	
14	Wake Forest	4–14	
15	Pittsburgh	0–18	

== Schedule ==
All games were televised on the ACC Network within the ACC footprint and simulcast nationally on the ESPN networks denoted below.

Session	Game	Time	Matchup	Score	Television	Attendance
First round – Tuesday, March 6
Opening day	1	12:00 pm	12 Boston College vs 13 Georgia Tech	87–77	ESPN2	10,612
Opening day	2	2:00 pm	10 Notre Dame vs 15 Pittsburgh	67–64	ESPN2	10,612
Opening day	3	7:00 pm	11 Syracuse vs 14 Wake Forest	73–64	ESPNU	10,612
Second round – Wednesday, March 7
1	4	12:00 pm	8 Florida State vs 9 Louisville	74–82	ESPN	17,732
1	5	2:30 pm	5 NC State vs 12 Boston College	87–91	ESPN	17,732
2	6	7:00 pm	7 Virginia Tech vs 10 Notre Dame	65–71	ESPN2	17,732
2	7	9:30 pm	6 North Carolina vs 11 Syracuse	78–59	ESPN2	17,732
Quarterfinals – Thursday, March 8
3	8	12:00 pm	1 Virginia vs 9 Louisville	75–58	ESPN	17,732
3	9	2:00 pm	4 Clemson vs 12 Boston College	90–82	ESPN	17,732
4	10	7:00 pm	2 Duke vs 10 Notre Dame	88–70	ESPN	17,732
4	11	9:00 pm	3 Miami vs 6 North Carolina	65–82	ESPN	17,732
Semifinals – Friday, March 9
5	12	7:00 pm	1 Virginia vs 4 Clemson	64–58	ESPN2	18,157
5	13	9:00 pm	2 Duke vs 6 North Carolina	69–74	ESPN	18,157
Championship – Saturday, March 10
6	14	8:30 pm	1 Virginia vs 6 North Carolina	71–63	ESPN	18,157
Game times in ET. Rankings denote tournament seed.

== Bracket ==
First round Tuesday, March 6 ESPN2/ESPNU/ACCN
12	Boston College	87
13	Georgia Tech	77
10	Notre Dame	67
15	Pittsburgh	64
11	Syracuse	73
14	Wake Forest	64

Second round Wednesday, March 7 ESPN/ESPN2/ACCN
8	Florida State	74
9	Louisville	82
5	NC State	87
12	Boston College	91
7	Virginia Tech	65
10	Notre Dame	71
6	#12 North Carolina	78
11	Syracuse	59

Quarterfinals; Thursday, March 8 ESPN/ESPN2/ACCN
1	#1 Virginia	75
9	Louisville	58
4	#19 Clemson	90
12	Boston College	82
2	#5 Duke	88
10	Notre Dame	70
3	#24 Miami	65
6	#12 North Carolina	82

Semifinals; Friday, March 9 ESPN/ESPN2/ACCN
1	#1 Virginia	64
4	#19 Clemson	58
2	#5 Duke	69
6	#12 North Carolina	74

Championship; Saturday, March 10; ESPN/ACCN
1	#1 Virginia	71
6	#12 North Carolina	63

== Game summaries ==
=== First round ===
Three games were played in the first round. In all three, the higher seed advanced.

In the first game, the 12-seed Boston College Eagles took on the 13-seed Georgia Tech Yellow Jackets. Boston College got out to a ten-point lead at halftime. They opened the second half on a 15–5 run, bringing their lead to 20 with under 14 minutes to play. A late flurry of scoring by Georgia Tech reduced the Eagles' lead to 6 with only 45 seconds remaining, but BC hit four free throws at the end of the game, ending the chance of a Yellow Jacket comeback. Georgia Tech's Tadric Jackson led all scorers with 29 points in the losing effort.

The second game featured the 10-seed Notre Dame Fighting Irish against the 15-seed Pittsburgh Panthers. The game looked to be one of the biggest mismatches in the tournament, with Notre Dame likely post-season bound with a 20-win season and Pittsburgh entering the tournament having lost every conference game and sporting a woeful 8–24 record. Instead, the two teams played the closest game of the first round, with Notre Dame clinging to a two-point lead with less than a minute remaining; however a controversial loose-ball foul against Pitt's Marcus Carr followed by a turnover by Carr allowed Notre Dame to preserve their lead and close out the game 67–64. Carr's late game mistakes were ironic as his three-pointer was the one that cut the Notre Dame lead to two, and he scored 18 in the game, tied with Jared Wilson-Frame to lead the Panthers in scoring. Notre Dame's Bonzie Colson led all scorers with 19.

The last game of the day featured the 11-seed Syracuse Orange versus the 14-seed Wake Forest Demon Deacons. Syracuse was playing with a short bench, as several injuries limited their ability to substitute. Despite leading by 19 with under eight minutes to play, the wear on Syracuse's starters showed, as they played all but the last 32 seconds of the second half, and that substitution was forced by Tyus Battle's fifth foul of the game. The Demon Deacons had cut the lead to six with fresher legs, but the Orange held on to win 73–64. Wake Forest's Bryant Crawford led all scoring with 22 points.

ESPN2

March 6
12:00 pm

Report

12 Boston College 87, 13 Georgia Tech 77
Scoring by half: 36–26, 51–51
Pts: Bowman (26); Rebs: Mitchell (11); Asts: Bowman (6)	Pts: Jackson (29); Rebs: Gueye (8); Asts: Jackson (5)

Barclays Center
Brooklyn, NY
Attendance: 10,612
Referees: Bert Smith, Les Jones, AJ Dasai

ESPN2

March 6
2:00 pm

Report

10 Notre Dame 67, 15 Pittsburgh 64
Scoring by half: 36–24, 31–40
Pts: Colson (19); Rebs: Geben, Mooney (9); Asts: Farrell (3)	Pts: Carr, Wilson-Frame (18); Rebs: Stewart (5); Asts: Stevenson (4)

Barclays Center
Brooklyn, NY
Attendance: 10,612
Referees: Lee Cassell, Jerry Heater, Clarence Armstrong

ESPNU

March 6
7:00 pm

Report

11 Syracuse 73, 14 Wake Forest 64
Scoring by half: 30–24, 43–40
Pts: Dolezaj (20); Rebs: Brissett, Chukwu (9); Asts: Howard (5)	Pts: Crawford (22); Rebs: Okeke (6); Asts: Crawford (6)

Barclays Center
Brooklyn, NY
Attendance: 10,612
Referees: Bill Covington Jr., Raymond Styons, Tim Comer

=== Second round ===
ESPN

March 7
12:00 pm

Report

8 Florida State 74, 9 Louisville 82
Scoring by half: 22–41, 52–41
Pts: Forrest, Savoy (14); Rebs: Kabengele, Mann (6); Asts: Forrest (6)	Pts: Snider (19); Rebs: Adel (8); Asts: Snider (6)

Barclays Center
Brooklyn, NY
Attendance: 17,732
Referees: Mike Eades, Tim Nestor, AJ Desai

ESPN

March 7
2:00 pm

Report

5 NC State 87, 12 Boston College 91
Scoring by half: 31–45, 56–46
Pts: Freeman (21); Rebs: Yurtseven (9); Asts: Johnson (6)	Pts: Robinson (26); Rebs: Mitchell (15); Asts: Robinson (5)

Barclays Center
Brooklyn, NY
Attendance: 17,732
Referees: Jamie Luckie, Ron Groover, Jerry Heater

ESPN2

March 7
7:00 pm

Report

7 Virginia Tech 65, 10 Notre Dame 71
Scoring by half: 34–21, 31–50
Pts: Robinson, Bibbs (15); Rebs: Blackshear Jr. (8); Asts: Robinson (7)	Pts: Farrell (22); Rebs: Pfleuger (9); Asts: Gibbs (7)

Barclays Center
Brooklyn, NY
Attendance: 17,732
Referees: Ted Valentine, Raymond Styons, Les Jones

ESPN2

March 7
9:00 pm

Report

6 North Carolina 78, 11 Syracuse 59
Scoring by half: 39–29, 39–30
Pts: Williams (17); Rebs: Pinson (11); Asts: Pinson (6)	Pts: Brissett (20); Rebs: Brissett (10); Asts: Howard (4)

Barclays Center
Brooklyn, NY
Attendance: 17,732
Referees: Roger Ayers, Bert Smith, Clarence Armstrong

=== Quarterfinals ===
ESPN

March 8
12:00 pm

Report

1 Virginia 75, 9 Louisville 58
Scoring by half: 38–27, 37–32
Pts: Guy (19); Rebs: Guy (7); Asts: Hall (5)	Pts: Spalding (16); Rebs: Spalding (6); Asts: Spalding, Snider (3)

Barclays Center
Brooklyn, NY
Attendance: 17,732
Referees: Ted Valentine, Jamie Luckie, Tim Comer

ESPN

March 8
2:00 pm

Report

4 Clemson 90, 12 Boston College 82
Scoring by half: 43–36, 47–46
Pts: DeVoe (25); Rebs: Thomas (12); Asts: DeVoe, Reed (4)	Pts: Bowman (23); Rebs: Mitchell (9); Asts: Bowman (4)

Barclays Center
Brooklyn, NY
Attendance: 17,732
Referees: Mike Eades, Tim Nestor, Les Jones

ESPN

March 8
7:00 pm

Report

2 Duke 88, 10 Notre Dame 70
Scoring by half: 41–37, 47–33
Pts: Bagley (33); Rebs: Bagley (17); Asts: Duval (11)	Pts: Colson (18); Rebs: Colson (9); Asts: Farrell (12)

Barclays Center
Brooklyn, NY
Attendance: 17,732
Referees: Roger Ayers, Lee Cassell, Jerry Heater

ESPN

March 8
9:00 pm

Report

3 Miami 65, 6 North Carolina 82
Scoring by half: 31–32, 34–50
Pts: Newton (17); Rebs: Huell, Newton (7); Asts: Walker, Waardenburg (3)	Pts: Pinson (25); Rebs: Maye (13); Asts: Johnson (5)

Barclays Center
Brooklyn, NY
Attendance: 17,732
Referees: Ron Groover, Bill Covington Jr., Raymond Styons

=== Semifinals ===
ESPN2

March 9
7:00 pm

Report

1 Virginia 64, 4 Clemson 58
Scoring by half: 32–23, 32–35
Pts: Guy (15); Rebs: Salt (8); Asts: Jerome (10)	Pts: Mitchell (18); Rebs: Thomas (7); Asts: DeVoe (3)

Barclays Center
Brooklyn, NY
Referees: Roger Aires, Bill Covington Jr., Lee Cassell

ESPN

March 9
9:00 pm

Report

2 Duke 69, 6 North Carolina 74
Scoring by half: 31–36, 38–38
Pts: Trent (20); Rebs: Bagley (13); Asts: Duval (7)	Pts: Maye (17); Rebs: Maye (10); Asts: Pinson (7)

Barclays Center
Brooklyn, NY
Attendance: 18,157
Referees: Bert Smith, Ted Valentine, Mike Eades

=== Championship ===
ESPN

March 10
8:30 pm

Report

1 Virginia 71, 6 North Carolina 63
Scoring by half: 34–30, 37–33
Pts: Guy (16); Rebs: Jerome (6); Asts: Jerome (6)	Pts: Maye (20); Rebs: Pinson (8); Asts: Pinson (6)

Barclays Center
Brooklyn, NY
Attendance: 18,157
Referees: Tim Nestor, Ron Groover, Jamie Luckie

== Awards and honors ==
Tournament MVP: Kyle Guy

All-Tournament Teams:

First Team
- Kyle Guy, Virginia
- Theo Pinson, North Carolina
- Luke Maye, North Carolina
- Devon Hall, Virginia
- Marvin Bagley, Duke

Second Team
- Ty Jerome, Virginia
- Joel Berry, North Carolina
- Bonzie Colson, Notre Dame
- Shelton Mitchell, Clemson
- Ky Bowman, Boston College

== See also ==
- 2018 ACC women's basketball tournament
