= 2017–18 Wake Forest Demon Deacons men's basketball team =

American college basketball season

2017–18 Wake Forest Demon Deacons men's basketball
- Conference: Atlantic Coast Conference
- Record: 11–20 (4–14 ACC)
- Head coach: Danny Manning (4th season)
- Assistant coaches: Steve Woodberry; Randolph Childress; Jamil Jones
- Home arena: LJVM Coliseum

2017–18 ACC men's basketball standings
	Conf.				Overall
Team	W		L	PCT	W		L	PCT
No. 1 Virginia †	17	–	1	.944	31	–	3	.912
No. 9 Duke	13	–	5	.722	29	–	8	.784
No. 22 Miami (FL)	11	–	7	.611	22	–	10	.688
No. 20 Clemson	11	–	7	.611	25	–	10	.714
NC State	11	–	7	.611	21	–	12	.636
No. 10 North Carolina	11	–	7	.611	26	–	11	.703
Virginia Tech	10	–	8	.556	21	–	12	.636
Florida State	9	–	9	.500	23	–	12	.657
Louisville	9	–	9	.500	22	–	14	.611
Notre Dame	8	–	10	.444	21	–	15	.583
Syracuse	8	–	10	.444	23	–	14	.622
Boston College	7	–	11	.389	19	–	16	.543
Georgia Tech	6	–	12	.333	13	–	19	.406
Wake Forest	4	–	14	.222	11	–	20	.355
Pittsburgh	0	–	18	.000	8	–	24	.250
† 2018 ACC tournament winner Rankings from AP poll

The 2017–18 Wake Forest Demon Deacons men's basketball team represented Wake Forest University during the 2017–18 NCAA Division I men's basketball season. The Demon Deacons were led by fourth-year head coach Danny Manning and played their home games at the Lawrence Joel Veterans Memorial Coliseum in Winston-Salem, North Carolina as members of the Atlantic Coast Conference. They finished the season 11–20, 4–14 in ACC play to finish in 14th place. They lost in the first round of the ACC tournament to Syracuse.

== Previous season ==
The Demon Deacons finished 2016–17 season 19–14, 9–9 in ACC play to finish in tenth place. They defeated Boston College in the first round of the ACC tournament to advance to the second round where they lost to Virginia Tech. They received an at-large bid to the NCAA tournament as a No. 11 seed in the South region. There they lost in the First Four to Kansas State.

== Offseason ==
=== Departures ===
Name	Number	Pos.	Height	Weight	Year	Hometown	Reason for departure
Grey McClinton	11	G	6'7"	200	RS Junior	Winston-Salem, NC	Graduate transferred to Old Dominion
John Collins	20	F	6'10"	225	Sophomore	West Palm Beach, FL	Declare for 2017 NBA draft
Austin Arians	34	F	6'6"	200	RS Senior	Stoughton, WI	Graduated
Trent VanHorn	43	G	6'3"	215	Senior	Fort Wayne, IN	Graduated
Konstantinos Mitoglou	44	F	6'10"	245	Junior	Thessaloniki, Greece	Signed to play professionally in Greece with Panathinaikos B.C.

=== Incoming transfers ===
Name	Number	Pos.	Height	Weight	Year	Hometown	Previous School
Terrence Thompson	20	F	6'7"	217	Senior	Durham, NC	Transferred from Marshall. Will be eligible to play immediately since Thompson graduated from Marshall.

=== 2017 recruiting class ===
College recruiting information
Name	Hometown	School	Height	Weight	Commit date
Chaundee Brown #7 SG	Orlando, FL	The First Academy	6 ft 5 in (1.96 m)	195 lb (88 kg)	Oct 2, 2016
Chaundee Brown #7 SG	Recruit ratings: Scout: Rivals: 247Sports: ESPN:				
Melo Eggleston #70 SF	Washington, D.C.	Clinton Christian School	6 ft 8 in (2.03 m)	187 lb (85 kg)	Apr 25, 2016
Melo Eggleston #70 SF	Recruit ratings: Scout: Rivals: 247Sports: ESPN:				
Olivier Sarr; C	Paris, FR	INSEP Paris	6 ft 11 in (2.11 m)	225 lb (102 kg)	Apr 12, 2017
Olivier Sarr; C	Recruit ratings: Scout: Rivals: 247Sports: ESPN:				
Overall recruit ranking:
Note: In many cases, Scout, Rivals, 247Sports, On3, and ESPN may conflict in their listings of height and weight.; In these cases, the average was taken. ESPN grades are on a 100-point scale.; Sources: "2017 Team Ranking". Rivals.

=== 2018 recruiting class ===
College recruiting information (2018)
Name	Hometown	School	Height	Weight	Commit date
Jaylen Hoard #6 SF	Carnon, France	Wesleyan Christian Academy	6 ft 8 in (2.03 m)	195 lb (88 kg)	Aug 26, 2017
Jaylen Hoard #6 SF	Recruit ratings: Scout: Rivals: 247Sports: ESPN:				
Isaiah Mucius #20 SF	Saint James, MD	Brewster Academy	6 ft 7 in (2.01 m)	180 lb (82 kg)	Sep 18, 2017
Isaiah Mucius #20 SF	Recruit ratings: Scout: Rivals: 247Sports: ESPN:				
Sharone Wright #50 SG	Florence, SC	West Florence High School	6 ft 5 in (1.96 m)	200 lb (91 kg)	May 12, 2017
Sharone Wright #50 SG	Recruit ratings: Scout: Rivals: 247Sports: ESPN:				
Jamie Lewis #39 SG	Atlanta, GA	Findlay Prep	6 ft 3 in (1.91 m)	185 lb (84 kg)	Nov 8, 2017
Jamie Lewis #39 SG	Recruit ratings: Scout: Rivals: 247Sports: ESPN:				
Christian Lorng #69 PF	Allen, KY	Hargrave Military Academy	6 ft 10 in (2.08 m)	240 lb (110 kg)	Mar 22, 2018
Christian Lorng #69 PF	Recruit ratings: Scout: Rivals: 247Sports: ESPN:				
Overall recruit ranking:
Note: In many cases, Scout, Rivals, 247Sports, On3, and ESPN may conflict in their listings of height and weight.; In these cases, the average was taken. ESPN grades are on a 100-point scale.; Sources: "2018 Team Ranking". Rivals.

== Roster ==
2017–18 Wake Forest Demon Deacons men's basketball team
Players
Coaches

Pos.	#	Name	Height	Weight	Year	Previous school	Hometown
G	0	Brandon Childress	6 ft 0 in (1.83 m)	190 lb (86 kg)	So	Wesleyan Christian Academy	Winston-Salem, NC
G	1	Keyshawn Woods	6 ft 3 in (1.91 m)	205 lb (93 kg)	RS Jr	Northside Christian Academy; Charlotte	Gastonia, NC
F	2	D. J. Mitchell	6 ft 8 in (2.03 m)	215 lb (98 kg)	So	Buchanan	Clovis, CA
C	4	Doral Moore	7 ft 1 in (2.16 m)	280 lb (127 kg)	Jr	Montverde Academy	Locust Grove, GA
G	10	Mitchell Wilbekin	6 ft 2 in (1.88 m)	180 lb (82 kg)	Sr	The Rock School	Gainesville, FL
G/F	11	Melo Eggleston	6 ft 8 in (2.03 m)	190 lb (86 kg)	Fr	Notre Dame Prep	Suitland, MD
G	13	Bryant Crawford	6 ft 3 in (1.91 m)	200 lb (91 kg)	Jr	Gonzaga College HS	Kensington, MD
F	20	Terrence Thompson	6 ft 7 in (2.01 m)	215 lb (98 kg)	Sr	Riverside; Marshall	Durham, NC
G	23	Chaundee Brown	6 ft 5 in (1.96 m)	215 lb (98 kg)	Fr	First Academy	Orlando, FL
C	25	Sam Japhet-Mathias	6 ft 11 in (2.11 m)	280 lb (127 kg)	So	City of London Academy	London, England
C	30	Olivier Sarr	7 ft 0 in (2.13 m)	215 lb (98 kg)	Fr	INSEP	Toulouse, France
F	33	Rich Washington	6 ft 6 in (1.98 m)	190 lb (86 kg)	So	Walsingham Academy	Williamsburg, VA
F	34	Sunday Okeke (W)	6 ft 8 in (2.03 m)	240 lb (109 kg)	Fr	Greens Farms Academy	Lagos, Nigera
G	40	Anthony Bilas (W)	6 ft 2 in (1.88 m)	160 lb (73 kg)	Jr	Charlotte Latin School	Charlotte, NC
G	41	Aaron Spivey (W)	6 ft 2 in (1.88 m)	175 lb (79 kg)	Jr	Nash Central	Rocky Mount, NC
F	45	Troy Rike (W)	6 ft 7 in (2.01 m)	225 lb (102 kg)	Sr	St. Ignatius College Preparatory	San Francisco, CA
G	52	Britton Anderson (W)	6 ft 4 in (1.93 m)	200 lb (91 kg)	Sr	Flint Hill School	Great Falls, VA

Head coach

- Danny Manning (Kansas)

Assistant coach(es)

- Steve Woodberry (Kansas)
- Randolph Childress (Wake Forest)
- Jamil Jones (Arkansas Tech)

Legend

- (C) Team captain
- (S) Suspended
- (I) Ineligible
- (W) Walk-on
- Injured
- Current redshirt

Roster

== Schedule and results ==
Date time, TV	Rank^{#}	Opponent^{#}	Result	Record	High points	High rebounds	High assists	Site (attendance) city, state
Exhibition
Nov 3, 2017*; 7:30 pm		Queens (NC)	W 76–74		21 – Woods	11 – Thompson	4 – Crawford	LJVM Coliseum (4,238); Winston-Salem, NC
Non-conference regular season
Nov 10, 2017*; 7:30 pm, ACCN Extra		Georgia Southern	L 83–85	0–1	25 – Woods	11 – Thompson	9 – Childress	LJVM Coliseum (7,802); Winston-Salem, NC
Nov 14, 2017*; 7:30 pm, ACCN Extra		Liberty	L 66–79	0–2	21 – Crawford	9 – Moore	3 – Brown	LJVM Coliseum (5,213); Winston-Salem, NC
Nov 17, 2017*; 8:30 pm, FloHoops.com		vs. Drake; Paradise Jam quarterfinals	L 74–77	0–3	17 – Moore	17 – Moore	9 – Crawford	Vines Center (586); Lynchburg, VA
Nov 18, 2017*; 2:30 pm, FloHoops.com		vs. Quinnipiac; Paradise Jam 2nd round consolation	W 72–55	1–3	17 – Crawford	7 – Brown	4 – Childress	Vines Center (743); Lynchburg, VA
Nov 19, 2017*; 2:30 p.m., FloHoops.com		vs. Houston; Paradise Jam	L 73–78	1–4	17 – Crawford	9 – Moore	4 – Childress	Vines Center (655); Lynchburg, VA
Nov 24, 2017*; 7:00 pm, ACCN Extra		UNC Greensboro	W 81–75	2–4	20 – Woods	7 – Moore	5 – Crawford	LJVM Coliseum (6,810); Winston-Salem, NC
Nov 28, 2017*; 9:00 pm, ESPNU		Illinois; ACC–Big Ten Challenge	W 80–73	3–4	20 – Crawford	6 – Moore	4 – Crawford	LJVM Coliseum (5,782); Winston-Salem, NC
Dec 2, 2017*; 4:00 pm, RSN		Richmond	W 82–53	4–4	17 – Woods	8 – Moore	7 – Crawford	LJVM Coliseum (6,591); Winston-Salem, NC
Dec 5, 2017*; 7:00 pm, Stadium		at Charlotte	W 80–57	5–4	17 – Crawford	7 – Sarr	4 – Crawford	Dale F. Halton Arena (5,512); Charlotte, NC
Dec 8, 2017*; 7:00 pm, ACCN Extra		Army	W 100–80	6–4	22 – Woods	11 – Moore	9 – Crawford	LJVM Coliseum (2,978); Winston-Salem, NC
Dec 18, 2017*; 7:00 pm		at Coastal Carolina	W 84–80	7–4	22 – Crawford	10 – Moore	6 – Crawford	HTC Center (1,744); Conway, NC
Dec 23, 2017*; 12:30 pm, ESPN2		No. 21 Tennessee	L 60–79	7–5	18 – Woods	8 – Sarr	2 – Crawford	LJVM Coliseum (11,362); Winston-Salem, NC
ACC regular season
Dec 30, 2017; 12:00 pm, ESPN2		at No. 13 North Carolina	L 69–73	7–6 (0–1)	17 – Crawford	8 – Moore	7 – Childress	Dean Smith Center (19,578); Chapel Hill, NC
Jan 3, 2018; 7:00 pm, ESPNU		Syracuse	W 73–67	8–6 (1–1)	19 – Crawford	9 – Moore	8 – Wilbekin	LJVM Coliseum (8,109); Winston-Salem, NC
Jan 6, 2018; 4:00 pm, RSN		at Boston College	L 71–77	8–7 (1–2)	24 – Crawford	9 – Moore	5 – Childress	Conte Forum (5,247); Chestnut Hill, MA
Jan 10, 2018; 7:00 pm, RSN		Virginia Tech	L 75–83	8–8 (1–3)	17 – Childress	13 – Moore	4 – Tied	LJVM Coliseum (8,260); Winston-Salem, NC
Jan 13, 2018; 12:00 pm, ACCN		at No. 7 Duke	L 71–89	8–9 (1–4)	21 – Crawford	6 – 4 Tied	6 – Crawford	Cameron Indoor Stadium (9,314); Durham, NC
Jan 18, 2018; 8:00 pm, ACCN		at NC State	L 63–72	8–10 (1–5)	18 – Crawford	10 – Moore	5 – Crawford	PNC Arena (15,815); Raleigh, NC
Jan 21, 2018; 6:00 pm, ESPNU		No. 2 Virginia	L 49–59	8–11 (1–6)	11 – Crawford	13 – Moore	4 – Crawford	LJVM Coliseum (10,014); Winston-Salem, NC
Jan 23, 2018; 9:00 pm, RSN		No. 4 Duke	L 70–84	8–12 (1–7)	18 – Tied	12 – Moore	5 – Brown	LJVM Coliseum (13,209); Winston-Salem, NC
Jan 27, 2018; 8:00 pm, ACCN		at Louisville	L 77–96	8–13 (1–8)	20 – Brown	13 – Moore	6 – Crawford	KFC Yum! Center (17,215); Louisville, KY
Jan 31, 2018; 8:00 pm, ACCN		Florida State	W 76–72	9–13 (2–8)	19 – Crawford	12 – Moore	7 – Crawford	LJVM Coliseum (7,809); Winston-Salem, NC
Feb 3, 2018; 2:00 pm, RSN		No. 20 Clemson	L 67–75	9–14 (2–9)	16 – Crawford	13 – Moore	6 – Crawford	LJVM Coliseum (10,468); Winston-Salem, NC
Feb 7, 2018; 2:00 pm, ESPN2		at No. 25 Miami (FL)	L 81–87	9–15 (2–10)	23 – Crawford	10 – Moore	7 – Crawford	Watsco Center (6,774); Coral Gables, FL
Feb 11, 2018; 1:00 pm, ACCN		at Syracuse	L 70–78	9–16 (2–11)	24 – Crawford	16 – Moore	7 – Crawford	Carrier Dome (24,018); Syracuse, NY
Feb 14, 2018; 9:00 pm, RSN		Georgia Tech	W 79–62	10–16 (3–11)	17 – Moore	12 – Moore	9 – Crawford	LJVM Coliseum (6,133); Winston-Salem, NC
Feb 17, 2018; 4:00 pm, ACCN		NC State	L 84–90	10–17 (3–12)	29 – Crawford	12 – Moore	3 – Tied	LJVM Coliseum (13,641); Winston-Salem, NC
Feb 21, 2018; 9:00 pm, RSN		at Pittsburgh	W 63–57	11–17 (4–12)	14 – Crawford	9 – Moore	3 – Tied	Peterson Events Center (2,420); Pittsburgh, PA
Feb 24, 2018; 3:00 pm, ACCN		Notre Dame	L 71–76	11–18 (4–13)	14 – Wilbekin	6 – Moore	6 – Wilbekin	LJVM Coliseum (10,626); Winston-Salem, NC
Mar 3, 2018; 12:00 pm, ACCN		at Georgia Tech	L 56–64	11–19 (4–14)	22 – Crawford	13 – Moore	4 – Childress	McCamish Pavilion (7,422); Atlanta, GA
ACC tournament
Mar 6, 2018; 7:00 pm, ESPN2	(14)	vs. (11) Syracuse; First Round	L 64–73	11–20	22 – Crawford	6 – Okeke	6 – Crawford	Barclays Center (10,612); Brooklyn, NY
*Non-conference game. ^{#}Rankings from AP Poll. (#) Tournament seedings in parentheses. All times are in Eastern Time.
