= 2017–18 Miami Hurricanes men's basketball team =

American college basketball season

2017–18 Miami Hurricanes men's basketball

NCAA tournament, First Round
- Conference: Atlantic Coast Conference

Ranking
- AP: No. 22
- Record: 22–10 (11–7 ACC)
- Head coach: Jim Larrañaga (7th season)
- Assistant coaches: Chris Caputo; Jamal Brunt; Adam Fisher
- Home arena: Watsco Center

2017–18 ACC men's basketball standings
	Conf.				Overall
Team	W		L	PCT	W		L	PCT
No. 1 Virginia †	17	–	1	.944	31	–	3	.912
No. 9 Duke	13	–	5	.722	29	–	8	.784
No. 22 Miami (FL)	11	–	7	.611	22	–	10	.688
No. 20 Clemson	11	–	7	.611	25	–	10	.714
NC State	11	–	7	.611	21	–	12	.636
No. 10 North Carolina	11	–	7	.611	26	–	11	.703
Virginia Tech	10	–	8	.556	21	–	12	.636
Florida State	9	–	9	.500	23	–	12	.657
Louisville	9	–	9	.500	22	–	14	.611
Notre Dame	8	–	10	.444	21	–	15	.583
Syracuse	8	–	10	.444	23	–	14	.622
Boston College	7	–	11	.389	19	–	16	.543
Georgia Tech	6	–	12	.333	13	–	19	.406
Wake Forest	4	–	14	.222	11	–	20	.355
Pittsburgh	0	–	18	.000	8	–	24	.250
† 2018 ACC tournament winner Rankings from AP poll

The 2017–18 Miami Hurricanes men's basketball team represented the University of Miami during the 2017–18 NCAA Division I men's basketball season. Led by seventh-year head coach Jim Larrañaga, they played their home games at the Watsco Center on the university's campus in Coral Gables, Florida as members of the Atlantic Coast Conference (ACC). They finished the season 22–10, 11–7 in ACC play to finish in a four-way tie for third place. They lost in the quarterfinals of the ACC tournament to North Carolina. They received an at-large bid to the NCAA tournament, where they lost in the first round to Loyola–Chicago.

== Previous season ==
The Hurricanes finished the 2016–17 season 21–12, 10–8 in ACC play to finish in a three-way tie for seventh place. They defeated Syracuse in the second round of the ACC tournament to advance to the quarterfinals, where they lost to North Carolina. They received an at-large bid to the NCAA tournament as the #8 seed in the Midwest region, where they lost in the first round to #9 Michigan State.

== FBI investigation ==
On September 26, 2017 federal prosecutors in New York announced an investigation into an alleged "pay for play" scheme involving recruits at various schools, including Miami. On October 23, head coach Jim Larrañaga announced that he believed he was one of the coaches implicated in the FBI indictment. He insisted that he had done nothing wrong.

== Offseason ==
=== Departures ===
Departures
Name	Number	Pos.	Height	Weight	Year	Hometown	Reason for departure
Davon Reed	5	G	6'6"	220	Senior	Ewing, NJ	Graduated
Kamari Murphy	21	F	6'8"	220	RS senior	Brooklyn, NY	Graduated

=== Incoming transfers ===
Incoming transfers
Name	Number	Pos.	Height	Weight	Year	Hometown	Previous school
Miles Wilson	10	G	6'5"	165	Sophomore	Reistertown, MD	Mount St. Mary's

=== 2017 recruiting class ===
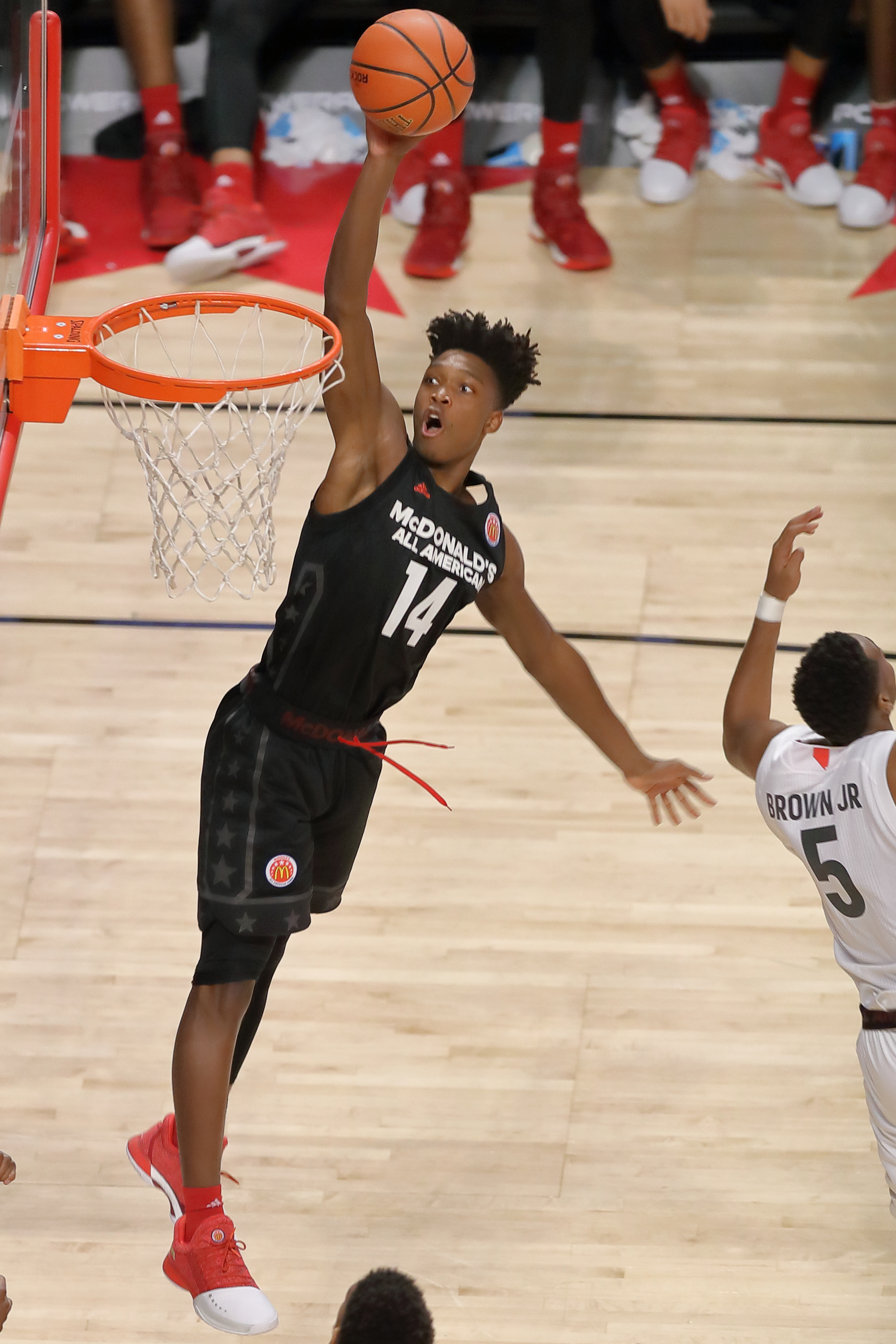
Miami recruit Lonnie Walker at the 2017 McDonald's All-American Boys Game

College recruiting
Name	Hometown	School	Height	Weight	Commit date
Lonnie Walker IV; G	Reading, PA	Reading High School	6 ft 5 in (1.96 m)	206 lb (93 kg)	Nov 16, 2016
Lonnie Walker IV; G	Recruit ratings: Scout: Rivals: 247Sports: ESPN:				
Chris Lykes; G	Mitchellville, MD	Gonzaga College High School	5 ft 6 in (1.68 m)	160 lb (73 kg)	Jun 12, 2016
Chris Lykes; G	Recruit ratings: Scout: Rivals: 247Sports: ESPN:				
Deng Gak; F	Sydney, Australia	Blair Academy	6 ft 11 in (2.11 m)	209 lb (95 kg)	Oct 25, 2016
Deng Gak; F	Recruit ratings: Scout: Rivals: 247Sports: ESPN:				
Sam Waardenburg; F	Henderson, New Zealand	Rangitoto College	6 ft 9 in (2.06 m)	205 lb (93 kg)	Sep 13, 2016
Sam Waardenburg; F	Recruit ratings: Scout: Rivals: 247Sports: ESPN:				
Overall recruit ranking:
Note: In many cases, Scout, Rivals, 247Sports, On3, and ESPN may conflict in their listings of height and weight.; In these cases, the average was taken. ESPN grades are on a 100-point scale.; Sources: "2017 Team Ranking". Rivals.

== Roster ==
2017–18 Miami Hurricanes men's basketball team
Players
Coaches

Pos.	#	Name	Height	Weight	Year	Hometown
G	0	Ja’Quan Newton	6 ft 3 in (1.91 m)	191 lb (87 kg)	Sr	Philadelphia, PA
G	1	Dejan Vasiljevic	6 ft 3 in (1.91 m)	203 lb (92 kg)	So	Melbourne, Australia
G	2	Chris Lykes	5 ft 7 in (1.7 m)	161 lb (73 kg)	Fr	Mitchellville, MD
G	3	Anthony Lawrence II	6 ft 7 in (2.01 m)	210 lb (95 kg)	Jr	St. Petersburg, FL
G	4	Lonnie Walker IV	6 ft 5 in (1.96 m)	204 lb (93 kg)	Fr	Reading, PA
G	5	Mike Robinson (W)	5 ft 10 in (1.78 m)	170 lb (77 kg)	Jr	New Britain, CT
G	10	Miles Wilson (I) (redshirt)	6 ft 5 in (1.96 m)	198 lb (90 kg)	So	Reisterstown, MD
G	11	Bruce Brown	6 ft 5 in (1.96 m)	202 lb (92 kg)	So	Boston, MA
C	14	Rodney Miller Jr.	7 ft 0 in (2.13 m)	255 lb (116 kg)	So	Laurelton, NY
C	15	Ebuka Izundu	6 ft 10 in (2.08 m)	235 lb (107 kg)	Jr	Charlotte, NC
F	20	Dewan Huell	6 ft 11 in (2.11 m)	236 lb (107 kg)	So	Miami, FL
F	21	Sam Waardenburg	6 ft 9 in (2.06 m)	217 lb (98 kg)	RS Fr	Henderson, New Zealand
F	22	Deng Gak (redshirt)	6 ft 10 in (2.08 m)	195 lb (88 kg)	Fr	Sydney, Australia
F	35	Chris Stowell (W)	6 ft 6 in (1.98 m)	208 lb (94 kg)	Sr	Exeter, NH

Head coach

- Jim Larrañaga (Providence)

Assistant coach(es)

- Chris Caputo (Westfield State)
- Jamal Brunt (Randolph–Macon)
- Adam Fisher (Penn State)

Legend

- (C) Team captain
- (S) Suspended
- (I) Ineligible
- (W) Walk-on
- Injured
- Current redshirt

Roster

== Schedule and results ==
Date time, TV	Rank^{#}	Opponent^{#}	Result	Record	High points	High rebounds	High assists	Site (attendance) city, state
Exhibition
Nov 1, 2017*; 7:00 pm, ACCN Extra	No. 13	Newberry College	W 106–79		30 – Vasiljevic	7 – Vasiljevic	8 – Tied	Watsco Center (6,174); Coral Gables, FL
Non-conference regular season
Nov 10, 2017*; 8:00 pm, ACCN Extra	No. 13	Gardner–Webb	W 77–45	1–0	14 – Izundu	11 – Brown Jr.	10 – Brown Jr.	Watsco Center (7,073); Coral Gables, FL
Nov 12, 2017*; 4:00 pm, ACCN Extra	No. 13	Navy	W 89–55	2–0	16 – Vasiljevic	10 – Huell	6 – Brown Jr.	Watsco Center (6,611); Coral Gables, FL
Nov 16, 2017*; 7:00 pm, ACCN Extra	No. 11	Florida A&M	W 90–59	3–0	15 – Tied	8 – Brown Jr.	4 – Tied	Watsco Center (6,735); Coral Gables, FL
Nov 22, 2017*; 6:00 pm	No. 11	vs. La Salle; Reading Showcase	W 57–46	4–0	16 – Huell	11 – Brown Jr.	5 – Lawrence II	Santander Arena (6,735); Reading, PA
Nov 25, 2017*; 4:00 pm, RSN	No. 11	North Florida	W 86–65	5–0	14 – Tied	7 – Tied	4 – Tied	Watsco Center (7,189); Coral Gables, FL
Nov 29, 2017*; 9:00 pm, ESPN2	No. 10	at No. 12 Minnesota; Big Ten-ACC Challenge	W 86–81	6–0	23 – Huell	9 – Brown Jr.	9 – Newton	Williams Arena (14,625); Minneapolis, MN
Dec 2, 2017*; 8:00 pm, ESPNU	No. 10	vs. Princeton; Hoophall Miami Invitational	W 80–52	7–0	20 – Vasiljevic	10 – Lawrence	5 – Newton	American Airlines Arena (8,426); Miami, FL
Dec 5, 2017*; 7:00 pm, RSN	No. 10	Boston University	W 69–54	8–0	26 – Walker IV	7 – Walker IV	6 – Lawrence II	Watsco Center (6,893); Coral Gables, FL
Dec 16, 2017*; 12:00 pm, CBSSN	No. 6	at George Washington	W 59–50	9–0	15 – Huell	12 – Huell	3 – Tied	Charles E. Smith Center (3,862); Washington, D.C.
Dec 23, 2017*; 1:00 am, ESPNU	No. 6	at Hawaii; Diamond Head Classic First Round	W 75–57	10–0	16 – Tied	6 – Huell	8 – Brown Jr.	Stan Sheriff Center (7,669); Honolulu, HI
Dec 23, 2017*; 10:00 pm, ESPN2	No. 6	vs. New Mexico State; Diamond Head Classic Semifinals	L 54–63	10–1	15 – Vasiljevic	9 – Huell	1 – Tied	Stan Sheriff Center (5,946); Honolulu, HI
Dec 25, 2017*; 8:30 pm, ESPNU	No. 15	vs. Middle Tennessee; Diamond Head Classic 3rd Place	W 84–81	11–1	21 – Huell	6 – Brown Jr.	6 – Newton	Stan Sheriff Center (6,062); Honolulu, HI
ACC regular season
Dec 30, 2017; 4:00 pm, ACCN	No. 15	at Pittsburgh	W 67–53	12–1 (1–0)	12 – Lawrence II	7 – Huell	4 – Newton	Peterson Events Center (5,307); Pittsburgh, PA
Jan 3, 2018; 9:00 pm, RSN	No. 15	at Georgia Tech	L 54–64	12–2 (1–1)	13 – Huell	12 – Lawrence II	5 – Lykes	McCamish Pavilion (5,568); Atlanta, GA
Jan 7, 2018; 6:00 pm, ESPNU	No. 15	No. 24 Florida State	W 80–74	13–2 (2–1)	23 – Brown Jr.	12 – Lawrence II	4 – Tied	Watsco Center (7,647); Coral Gables, FL
Jan 13, 2018; 3:00 pm, ESPNU	No. 18	at No. 19 Clemson	L 63–72	13–3 (2–2)	16 – Tied	7 – Tied	2 – Huell	Littlejohn Coliseum (9,000); Clemson, SC
Jan 15, 2018; 7:00 pm, ESPN	No. 25	No. 5 Duke	L 75–83	13–4 (2–3)	19 – Walker IV	13 – Huell	2 – Tied	Watsco Center (7,972); Coral Gables, FL
Jan 21, 2018; 12:00 pm, ACCN	No. 25	at NC State	W 86–81	14–4 (3–3)	19 – Brown Jr.	4 – Tied	9 – Brown Jr.	PNC Arena (17,265); Raleigh, NC
Jan 24, 2018; 8:00 pm, ESPN2		Louisville	W 78–75 ^{OT}	15–4 (4–3)	25 – Walker IV	12 – Huell	4 – Lykes	Watsco Center (7,190); Coral Gables, FL
Jan 27, 2018; 4:00 pm, ACCN		at Florida State	L 94–103 ^{OT}	15–5 (4–4)	23 – Walker IV	7 – Brown Jr.	5 – Tied	Donald L. Tucker Civic Center (11,675); Tallahassee, FL
Jan 31, 2018; 7:00 pm, RSN		Pittsburgh	W 69–57	16–5 (5–4)	16 – Walker IV	10 – Lawrence II	5 – Lykes	Watsco Center (7,169); Coral Gables, FL
Feb 3, 2018; 2:00 pm, ESPN		at Virginia Tech	W 84–75	17–5 (6–4)	25 – Lawrence II	13 – Lawrence II	4 – Newton	Cassell Coliseum (9,275); Blacksburg, VA
Feb 7, 2018; 7:00 pm, ESPN2	No. 25	Wake Forest	W 87–81	18–5 (7–4)	19 – Walker IV	10 – Huell	5 – Lykes	Watsco Center (6,774); Coral Gables, FL
Feb 10, 2018; 2:00 pm, RSN	No. 25	at Boston College	L 70–72	18–6 (7–5)	17 – Vasiljevic	9 – Lawrence II	4 – Lawrence II	Conte Forum (7,740); Chestnut Hill, MA
Feb 13, 2018; 9:00 pm, ESPN2		No. 1 Virginia	L 50–59	18–7 (7–6)	19 – Lykes	7 – Lawrence II	2 – Tied	Watsco Center (7,333); Coral Gables, FL
Feb 17, 2018; 12:00 pm, CBS		Syracuse	L 55–62	18–8 (7–7)	14 – Lykes	10 – Huell	5 – Lawrence II	Watsco Center (6,879); Coral Gables, FL
Feb 19, 2018; 7:00 pm, ESPN		at Notre Dame	W 77–74	19–8 (8–7)	19 – Walker IV	8 – Izundu	6 – Lawrence II	Joyce Center (9,149); Notre Dame, IN
Feb 24, 2018; 2:00 pm, RSN		Boston College	W 79–78	20–8 (9–7)	16 – Huell	9 – Tied	4 – Walker IV	Watsco Center (7,010); Coral Gables, FL
Feb 27, 2018; 9:00 pm, ESPN		at No. 9 North Carolina	W 91–88	21–8 (10–7)	18 – Lykes	8 – Huell	4 – Lykes	Dean Smith Center (21,750); Chapel Hill, NC
Mar 3, 2018; 12:00 pm, ESPN2		Virginia Tech	W 69–68	22–8 (11–7)	16 – Vasiljevic	6 – Lawrence II	7 – Lykes	Watsco Center (7,164); Coral Gables, FL
ACC tournament
Mar 8, 2018; 9:00 pm, ESPN	(3) No. 24	vs. (6) No. 12 North Carolina; Quarterfinals	L 65–82	22–9	17 – Newton	7 – Tied	3 – Tied	Barclays Center (17,732); Brooklyn, NY
NCAA tournament
Mar 15, 2018*; 3:10 pm, truTV	(6 S) No. 22	vs. (11 S) Loyola–Chicago; First Round	L 62–64	22–10	12 – Walker IV	7 – Huell	2 – Lykes	American Airlines Center (15,802); Dallas, TX
*Non-conference game. ^{#}Rankings from AP Poll. (#) Tournament seedings in parentheses. S=South Region. All times are in Eastern Time.

== Rankings ==
Ranking movements Legend: ██ Increase in ranking ██ Decrease in ranking — = Not ranked RV = Received votes
	Week																			
Poll	Pre	1	2	3	4	5	6	7	8	9	10	11	12	13	14	15	16	17	18	Final
AP	13	11	11	10	10	6	6	15	15	18	25	RV	RV	25	RV	—				Not released
Coaches	12	12^	11	13	11	8	7	16	17	19	23	24	RV	25	RV	RV				

^Coaches did not release a Week 2 poll.
*AP does not release post-NCAA tournament rankings.
