= 2017–18 Pittsburgh Panthers men's basketball team =

American college basketball season

2017–18 Pittsburgh Panthers men's basketball
- Conference: Atlantic Coast Conference
- Record: 8–24 (0–18 ACC)
- Head coach: Kevin Stallings (2nd season)
- Assistant coaches: Dan Cage (1st season); Kevin Sutton (2nd season); Sam Ferry (1st season)
- Home arena: Petersen Events Center (Capacity: 12,508)

2017–18 ACC men's basketball standings
| | Conf. | | | | Overall |
| Team | W | | L | PCT | W | | L | PCT |
|---|---|---|---|---|---|---|---|---|
| No. 1 Virginia † | 17 | – | 1 | .944 | 31 | – | 3 | .912 |
| No. 9 Duke | 13 | – | 5 | .722 | 29 | – | 8 | .784 |
| No. 22 Miami (FL) | 11 | – | 7 | .611 | 22 | – | 10 | .688 |
| No. 20 Clemson | 11 | – | 7 | .611 | 25 | – | 10 | .714 |
| NC State | 11 | – | 7 | .611 | 21 | – | 12 | .636 |
| No. 10 North Carolina | 11 | – | 7 | .611 | 26 | – | 11 | .703 |
| Virginia Tech | 10 | – | 8 | .556 | 21 | – | 12 | .636 |
| Florida State | 9 | – | 9 | .500 | 23 | – | 12 | .657 |
| Louisville | 9 | – | 9 | .500 | 22 | – | 14 | .611 |
| Notre Dame | 8 | – | 10 | .444 | 21 | – | 15 | .583 |
| Syracuse | 8 | – | 10 | .444 | 23 | – | 14 | .622 |
| Boston College | 7 | – | 11 | .389 | 19 | – | 16 | .543 |
| Georgia Tech | 6 | – | 12 | .333 | 13 | – | 19 | .406 |
| Wake Forest | 4 | – | 14 | .222 | 11 | – | 20 | .355 |
| Pittsburgh | 0 | – | 18 | .000 | 8 | – | 24 | .250 |
† 2018 ACC tournament winner Rankings from AP poll

The 2017–18 Pittsburgh Panthers men's basketball team represented the University of Pittsburgh during the 2017–18 NCAA Division I men's basketball season. The Panthers were led by second-year head coach Kevin Stallings and played their home games at the Petersen Events Center in Pittsburgh, Pennsylvania as members of the Atlantic Coast Conference.

The Panthers entered the season as one of the most inexperienced teams in NCAA Division I. ESPN's Andrea Adelson summed up the team's situation in a February 2018 piece:

Both he [Stallings] and those inside the program prepared for a rocky 2017–18: They had an NCAA-high 11 newcomers, zero returning starters and three total players with NCAA Division I experience on the roster when camp opened. That is not merely rebuilding; that is starting over with nothing to build off.

They finished with the worst season in program history, going 8–24 overall and 0–18 in ACC play, finishing last in the conference and losing in the first round of the ACC tournament to Notre Dame. On March 8, 2018, Pitt fired Stallings. On March 27, Pitt hired Duke assistant coach Jeff Capel as head coach.

== Previous season ==
The Panthers finished the 2016–17 season 16–17, 4–14 in ACC play to finish in a tie for 13th place. They defeated Georgia Tech in the first round of the ACC tournament to advance to the second round where they lost to Virginia.

On January 24, 2017, Pitt lost by 55 points to Louisville, the team's worst loss since 1906.

== Offseason ==
=== Departures ===
| Name | Number | Pos. | Height | Weight | Year | Hometown | Reason for departure |
|---|---|---|---|---|---|---|---|
| Crisshawn Clark | 0 | G | 6'4" | 210 | Sophomore | Huber Heights, OH | Transferred to Portland |
| Jamel Artis | 1 | F | 6'7" | 215 | Senior | Baltimore, MD | Graduated |
| Michael Young | 2 | F | 6'8" | 235 | Senior | Duquesne, PA | Graduated |
| Damon Wilson | 3 | G | 6'5" | 195 | Sophomore | Powder Springs, GA | Transferred to Georgia State |
| Justice Kithcart | 5 | G | 6'1" | 185 | Freshman | Durham, NC | Dismissed from the team due to conduct |
| Corey Manigault | 11 | F | 6'8" | 230 | Freshman | Suitland, MD | Transferred to Indian Hills CC |
| Chris Jones | 12 | G/F | 6'6" | 215 | (redshirt) Senior | Teaneck, NJ | Graduated |
| Sheldon Jeter | 21 | F | 6'8" | 230 | Senior | Beaver Falls, PA | Graduated |
| Cameron Johnson | 23 | G | 6'7" | 210 | (redshirt) Sophomore | Moon Township, PA | Graduate transferred to North Carolina |
| Rozelle Nix | 25 | C | 6'11" | 300 | (redshirt) Junior | Cincinnati, OH | Transferred to South Alabama |
| Ryan Seelye | 50 | F | 6'6" | 225 | Sophomore | St. Marys, PA | Walk-on; left the team due personal reasons |

=== Incoming transfers ===
| Name | Number | Pos. | Height | Weight | Year | Hometown | Previous School |
|---|---|---|---|---|---|---|---|
| Jared Wilson-Frame | 0 | F | 6'5" | 195 | Junior | Windsor, CT | Junior college transferred from Northwest Florida State College |
| Malik Ellison | 3 | G | 6'6" | 215 | Junior | Voorhees, NJ | Transferred from St. John's. Under NCAA transfer rules, Ellison will have to sit out from the 2017–18 season. Will have two years of remaining eligibility. |
| Kenechukwu Chukwuka | 15 | F | 6'8" | 215 | Sophomore | Stockholm, Sweden | Junior college transferred from New Mexico JC |
| Monty Boykins | 33 | G | 6'5" | 195 | (redshirt) Senior | West Chester, OH | Transferred from Lafayette. Will be eligible to play since Boykins graduated from Lafayette. |

=== 2017 recruiting class ===
College recruiting information
| Name | Hometown | School | Height | Weight | Commit date |
|---|---|---|---|---|---|
| Terrell Brown; C | East Providence, RI | Tilton School | 6 ft 10 in (2.08 m) | 225 lb (102 kg) | Sep 4, 2016 |
| Terrell Brown; C | Recruit ratings: Scout: Rivals: 247Sports: ESPN: | | | | |
| Parker Stewart #67 SG | Union City, TN | Union City High School | 6 ft 4 in (1.93 m) | 185 lb (84 kg) | Jun 19, 2017 |
| Parker Stewart #67 SG | Recruit ratings: Scout: Rivals: 247Sports: ESPN: | | | | |
| Marcus Carr #60 PG | Montverde, FL | Montverde Academy | 6 ft 2 in (1.88 m) | 170 lb (77 kg) | Oct 26, 2016 |
| Marcus Carr #60 PG | Recruit ratings: Scout: Rivals: 247Sports: ESPN: | | | | |
| Peace Ilegomah; C | Newark, NJ | Montverde Academy Prep | 6 ft 9 in (2.06 m) | 240 lb (110 kg) | Feb 3, 2017 |
| Peace Ilegomah; C | Recruit ratings: Scout: Rivals: 247Sports: ESPN: | | | | |
| Shamiel Stevenson; SF | Toronto, ON | Hillcrest Prep | 6 ft 7 in (2.01 m) | 228 lb (103 kg) | |
| Shamiel Stevenson; SF | Recruit ratings: Scout: Rivals: 247Sports: ESPN: | | | | |
| Samson George; PF | Washington, PA | First Love Christian Academy | 6 ft 8 in (2.03 m) | 220 lb (100 kg) | Jun 1, 2017 |
| Samson George; PF | Recruit ratings: Scout: Rivals: 247Sports: ESPN: | | | | |
| Khameron Davis; SG | Kernersville, NC | Forest Trail Academy | 6 ft 4 in (1.93 m) | 190 lb (86 kg) | May 4, 2017 |
| Khameron Davis; SG | Recruit ratings: Scout: Rivals: 247Sports: ESPN: | | | | |
Overall recruit ranking:
Note: In many cases, Scout, Rivals, 247Sports, On3, and ESPN may conflict in their listings of height and weight.; In these cases, the average was taken. ESPN grades are on a 100-point scale.; Sources: "2017 Team Ranking". Rivals.

== Roster ==
2017–18 Pittsburgh Panthers men's basketball team
Players
Coaches
}

| Pos. | # | Name | Height | Weight | Year | Previous school | Hometown |
|---|---|---|---|---|---|---|---|
| G/F | 0 | Jared Wilson-Frame | 6 ft 5 in (1.96 m) | 220 lb (100 kg) | Jr | Windsor; Northwest Florida State | Hartford, CT |
| G | 1 | Parker Stewart | 6 ft 5 in (1.96 m) | 195 lb (88 kg) | Fr | Union City | Union City, TN |
| G | 2 | Jonathan Milligan | 6 ft 2 in (1.88 m) | 170 lb (77 kg) | Sr | Mount Zion Christian (Durham, NC); Kilgore | Orlando, FL |
| G | 3 | Malik Ellison (I) (redshirt) | 6 ft 6 in (1.98 m) | 215 lb (98 kg) | Jr | Life Center Academy; St. John's | Voorhees, NJ |
| F | 4 | Ryan Luther | 6 ft 9 in (2.06 m) | 225 lb (102 kg) | Sr | Hampton | Gibsonia, PA |
| G | 5 | Marcus Carr | 6 ft 1 in (1.85 m) | 185 lb (84 kg) | Fr | Montverde Academy (Fla.) | Toronto, ON |
| G | 12 | Joe Mascaro (W) | 5 ft 10 in (1.78 m) | 170 lb (77 kg) | Jr | Bethel Park | Pittsburgh, PA |
| G | 13 | Khameron Davis | 6 ft 4 in (1.93 m) | 195 lb (88 kg) | Fr | Forest Trail Academy (NC) | Highlands Ranch, CO |
| F/C | 15 | Kene Chukwuka | 6 ft 9 in (2.06 m) | 215 lb (98 kg) | So | Söderslättsgymnasiet; New Mexico Junior College | Stockholm, Sweden |
| F/C | 21 | Terrell Brown | 6 ft 10 in (2.08 m) | 240 lb (109 kg) | Fr | Tilton School (NH) | Providence, RI |
| G | 22 | Anthony Starzynski (W) | 6 ft 3 in (1.91 m) | 180 lb (82 kg) | So | Baldwin | Pittsburgh, PA |
| G/F | 23 | Shamiel Stevenson | 6 ft 6 in (1.98 m) | 230 lb (104 kg) | Fr | Hillcrest Prep (AZ) | Toronto, ON |
| F | 24 | Samson George | 6 ft 7 in (2.01 m) | 220 lb (100 kg) | Fr | First Love Christian Academy (PA); Iona | Minna, Nigeria |
| G | 33 | Monty Boykins | 6 ft 5 in (1.96 m) | 195 lb (88 kg) | Sr | Lakota West; Lafayette | West Chester, OH |
| G | 35 | Zach Smith (redshirt) | 6 ft 3 in (1.91 m) | 200 lb (91 kg) | Sr | Smethport; Pitt-Bradford | Smethport, PA |
| C | 42 | Peace Ilegomah | 6 ft 9 in (2.06 m) | 235 lb (107 kg) | Fr | Montverde Academy (FL) | Benin City, Nigeria |

Head coach

- Kevin Stallings (Purdue)

Assistant coach(es)

- Kevin Sutton (James Madison)
- Dan Cage (Vanderbilt)
- Sam Ferry (Vanderbilt)

Legend

- (C) Team captain
- (S) Suspended
- (I) Ineligible
- (W) Walk-on
- Injured
- Current redshirt

Roster

== Schedule and results ==
| Date time, TV | Rank^{#} | Opponent^{#} | Result | Record | High points | High rebounds | High assists | Site (attendance) city, state |
Exhibition
| Sat. Nov. 4*; 2:00 pm | | Slippery Rock; Shoot Down Cancer Exhibition Game | W 71–59 | — | 24 – Wilson-Frame | 8 – Stevenson | 3 – Carr | Petersen Events Center (2,278); Pittsburgh, PA |
Non-conference regular season
| Fri. Nov. 10*; 9:00 pm, CBSSN | | at Navy; Veterans Classic | L 62–71 | 0–1 | 20 – Wilson-Frame | 9 – Stevenson | 4 – Tied | Alumni Hall (3,238); Annapolis, MD |
| Mon. Nov. 13*; 7:00 pm, ACCN Extra | | Montana; Legends Classic campus site game | L 78–83 ^{OT} | 0–2 | 19 – Stevenson | 11 – Luther | 3 – Tied | Petersen Events Center (3,102); Pittsburgh, PA |
| Wed. Nov. 15*; 7:00 pm, ACCN Extra | | UC Santa Barbara; Legends Classic campus site game | W 70–62 | 1–2 | 14 – Tied | 10 – Luther | 3 – Tied | Petersen Events Center (2,685); Pittsburgh, PA |
| Mon. Nov. 20*; 9:30 pm, ESPN3 | | vs. Penn State; Legends Classic semifinals | L 54–85 | 1–3 | 17 – Wilson-Frame | 9 – Luther | 3 – Stevenson | Barclays Center (5,904); Brooklyn, NY |
| Tue. Nov. 21*; 3:30 pm, ESPNU | | vs. Oklahoma State; Legends Classic 3rd place game | L 67–73 | 1–4 | 16 – Stevenson | 8 – Luther | 10 – Carr | Barclays Center (5,081); Brooklyn, NY |
| Sat. Nov. 25*; 2:00 pm, ACCN Extra | | Lehigh | W 80–68 | 2–4 | 18 – Luther | 10 – Luther | 5 – Chukwuka | Petersen Events Center (3,317); Pittsburgh, PA |
| Tue. Nov. 28*; 7:00 pm, ACCN Extra | | High Point | W 71–63 | 3–4 | 19 – Carr | 8 – Luther | 5 – Luther | Petersen Events Center (2,399); Pittsburgh, PA |
| Fri. Dec. 1*; 7:00 pm, Stadium | | vs. Duquesne; The City Game | W 76–64 | 4–4 | 16 – Luther | 9 – Luther | 5 – Carr | PPG Paints Arena (10,118); Pittsburgh, PA |
| Tue. Dec. 5*; 7:00 pm, ACCN Extra | | Mount St. Mary's | W 82–78 ^{OT} | 5–4 | 23 – Carr | 16 – Luther | 3 – Luther | Petersen Events Center (2,333); Pittsburgh, PA |
| Sat. Dec. 9*; 8:00 pm, ESPN2 | | No. 18 West Virginia; Backyard Brawl | L 60–69 | 5–5 | 13 – Luther | 12 – Luther | 4 – Carr | Petersen Events Center (7,748); Pittsburgh, PA |
| Sat. Dec. 16*; 2:00 pm, ACCN Extra | | McNeese State | W 72–51 | 6–5 | 19 – Wilson-Frame | 8 – Tied | 6 – Carr | Petersen Events Center (2,830); Pittsburgh, PA |
| Tue. Dec. 19*; 7:00 pm, ACCN Extra | | Delaware State | W 74–68 | 7–5 | 13 – Tied | 7 – Stevenson | 3 – 3 Tied | Petersen Events Center (2,372); Pittsburgh, PA |
| Fri. Dec. 22*; 7:00 pm, ACCN Extra | | Towson | W 63–59 | 8–5 | 13 – Stewart | 9 – Tied | 6 – Carr | Petersen Events Center (3,126); Pittsburgh, PA |
ACC regular season
| Sat. Dec. 30; 4:00 pm, ACCN | | No. 15 Miami (FL) | L 53–67 | 8–6 (0–1) | 13 – Wilson-Frame | 4 – Tied | 5 – Carr | Petersen Events Center (5,307); Pittsburgh, PA |
| Tue. Jan. 2; 9:00 pm, ESPNU | | at Louisville | L 51–77 | 8–7 (0–2) | 12 – Stewart | 6 – Tied | 2 – 3 Tied | KFC Yum! Center (16,461); Louisville, KY |
| Sat. Jan. 6; 12:00 pm, ACCN | | at Virginia Tech | L 67–81 | 8–8 (0–3) | 14 – Carr | 9 – Stevenson | 4 – Tied | Cassell Coliseum (5,478); Blacksburg, VA |
| Wed. Jan. 10; 7:00 pm, ESPN2 | | No. 7 Duke | L 52–87 | 8–9 (0–4) | 10 – Stewart | 4 – 5 Tied | 3 – Carr | Petersen Events Center (9,180); Pittsburgh, PA |
| Sat. Jan. 13; 2:00 pm, ACCN | | Georgia Tech | L 54–69 | 8–10 (0–5) | 9 – Tied | 5 – Stevenson | 3 – Carr | Petersen Events Center (3,544); Pittsburgh, PA |
| Tue. Jan. 16; 9:00 pm, ACCRSN | | at Syracuse | L 45–59 | 8–11 (0–6) | 23 – Stewart | 6 – Tied | 4 – Carr | Carrier Dome (21,259); Syracuse, NY |
| Sat. Jan. 20; 4:00 pm, ACCN | | at No. 5 Duke | L 54–81 | 8–12 (0–7) | 15 – Stewart | 8 – Chukwuka | 2 – 3 Tied | Cameron Indoor Stadium (9,314); Durham, NC |
| Wed. Jan. 24; 9:00 pm, ACCRSN | | NC State | L 68–72 | 8–13 (0–8) | 22 – Wilson-Frame | 6 – Tied | 4 – Wilson-Frame | Petersen Events Center (2,566); Pittsburgh, PA |
| Sat. Jan. 27; 4:00 pm, ACCN | | Syracuse | L 55–60 | 8–14 (0–9) | 18 – Wilson-Frame | 13 – Wilson-Frame | 12 – Carr | Petersen Events Center (7,033); Pittsburgh, PA |
| Wed. Jan. 31; 7:00 pm, ACCRSN | | at Miami (FL) | L 57–69 | 8–15 (0–10) | 17 – Wilson-Frame | 7 – Davis | 7 – Carr | Watsco Center (7,169); Coral Gables, FL |
| Sat. Feb. 3; 8:00 pm, ACCN | | at No. 19 North Carolina | L 65–96 | 8–16 (0–11) | 12 – Carr | 10 – Stewart | 5 – Carr | Dean Smith Center (20,381); Chapel Hill, NC |
| Thu. Feb. 8; 7:00 pm, ACCRSN | | at No. 16 Clemson | L 48–72 | 8–17 (0–12) | 19 – Brown | 8 – Brown | 4 – Carr | Littlejohn Coliseum (7,573); Clemson, SC |
| Sun. Feb. 11; 1:00 pm, ACCN | | Louisville | L 60–94 | 8–18 (0–13) | 12 – Stewart | 6 – Brown | 3 – Tied | Petersen Events Center (4,772); Pittsburgh, PA |
| Tue. Feb. 13; 7:00 pm, ESPNews | | Boston College | L 58–81 | 8–19 (0–14) | 16 – Stewart | 5 – Tied | 5 – Carr | Petersen Events Center (2,835); Pittsburgh, PA |
| Sun. Feb. 18; 6:00 pm, ESPNU | | at Florida State | L 75–88 | 8–20 (0–15) | 17 – Wilson-Frame | 5 – Stevenson | 5 – Milligan | Donald L. Tucker Center (9,123); Tallahassee, FL |
| Wed. Feb. 21; 9:00 pm, ACCRSN | | Wake Forest | L 57–63 | 8–21 (0–16) | 11 – Tied | 7 – Stewart | 4 – Tied | Petersen Events Center (2,420); Pittsburgh, PA |
| Sat. Feb. 24; 4:00 pm, ESPNU | | No. 1 Virginia | L 37–66 | 8–22 (0–17) | 8 – Milligan | 4 – Tied | 3 – Wilson-Frame | Petersen Events Center (6,534); Pittsburgh, PA |
| Wed. Feb. 28; 7:00 pm, ESPNU | | at Notre Dame | L 56–73 | 8–23 (0–18) | 10 – Tied | 8 – Brown | 5 – Carr | Edmund P. Joyce Center (9,007); South Bend, IN |
ACC Tournament
| Tue. Mar. 6; 2:45 pm, ESPN2 | (15) | vs. (10) Notre Dame; First Round | L 64–67 | 8–24 | 18 – Tied | 5 – Stewart | 4 – Stevenson | Barclays Center (10,612); Brooklyn, NY |
*Non-conference game. ^{#}Rankings from AP Poll. (#) Tournament seedings in parentheses. All times are in Eastern Time.
