= 2017–18 Georgia Tech Yellow Jackets men's basketball team =

American college basketball season

2017–18 Georgia Tech Yellow Jackets men's basketball
- Conference: Atlantic Coast Conference
- Record: 13–19 (6–12 ACC)
- Head coach: Josh Pastner (2nd season)
- Assistant coaches: Tavaras Hardy; Darryl LaBarrie; Eric Reveno
- Home arena: McCamish Pavilion

2017–18 ACC men's basketball standings
	Conf.				Overall
Team	W		L	PCT	W		L	PCT
No. 1 Virginia †	17	–	1	.944	31	–	3	.912
No. 9 Duke	13	–	5	.722	29	–	8	.784
No. 22 Miami (FL)	11	–	7	.611	22	–	10	.688
No. 20 Clemson	11	–	7	.611	25	–	10	.714
NC State	11	–	7	.611	21	–	12	.636
No. 10 North Carolina	11	–	7	.611	26	–	11	.703
Virginia Tech	10	–	8	.556	21	–	12	.636
Florida State	9	–	9	.500	23	–	12	.657
Louisville	9	–	9	.500	22	–	14	.611
Notre Dame	8	–	10	.444	21	–	15	.583
Syracuse	8	–	10	.444	23	–	14	.622
Boston College	7	–	11	.389	19	–	16	.543
Georgia Tech	6	–	12	.333	13	–	19	.406
Wake Forest	4	–	14	.222	11	–	20	.355
Pittsburgh	0	–	18	.000	8	–	24	.250
† 2018 ACC tournament winner Rankings from AP poll

The 2017–18 Georgia Tech Yellow Jackets men's basketball team represented the Georgia Institute of Technology during the 2017–18 NCAA Division I men's basketball season. They were led by second-year head coach Josh Pastner and played their home games at Hank McCamish Pavilion as members of the Atlantic Coast Conference. They finished the season 13–19, 6–12 in ACC play to finish in 13th place. They lost in the first round of the ACC tournament to Boston College.

== Previous season ==
The Yellow Jackets finished the 2016–17 season 21–16, 8–10 in ACC play to finish in 11th place. They lost in the first round of the ACC tournament to Pittsburgh. The Yellow Jackets received an invitation to the National Invitation Tournament where they defeated Indiana, Belmont, and Ole Miss to advance to the semifinals at Madison Square Garden. At MSG, they defeated Cal State Bakersfield before losing in the championship game to TCU.

== Departures ==
Name	Number	Pos.	Height	Weight	Year	Hometown	Reason for departure
Jordan Price	2	G/F	6'7	172	RS Senior	Indianapolis, IN	Graduated
Josh Heath	11	G	6'2"	179	Senior	Tampa, FL	Graduated
Quinton Stephens	12	F	6'9"	203	Senior	Atlanta, GA	Graduated
Christian Matthews	23	F	6'9"	190	Freshman	Clinton, MD	Transferred to Mineral Area College
Corey Heyward	30	G	6'1"	210	RS Senior	Duluth, GA	Graduated
Kellen McCormick	32	F	6'8"	215	RS Senior	West Bloomfield, MI	Graduated
Rand Rowland	42	F	6'7"	213	Senior	Cleveland, GA	Graduated

=== Incoming transfers ===
Name	Number	Pos.	Height	Weight	Year	Hometown	Previous School
Shembari Phillips	2	G	6'3"	192	Junior	Atlanta, GA	Transferred from Tennessee. Under NCAA transfer rules, Phillips will have to sit out for the 2017–18 season. Will have two years of remaining eligibility.
Brandon Alston	4	G	6'5"	200	Senior	Vienna, VA	Transferred from Lehigh. Will be eligible to play immediately since Alson graduated from Lehigh.

== 2017 recruiting class ==
College recruiting information
Name	Hometown	School	Height	Weight	Commit date
Curtis Haywood II #37 SF	Yukon, OK	Brewster Academy	6 ft 5 in (1.96 m)	180 lb (82 kg)	Dec 22, 2016
Curtis Haywood II #37 SF	Recruit ratings: Scout: Rivals: 247Sports: ESPN:				
Jose Alvarado #34 PG	Brooklyn, NY	Christ the King High School	5 ft 11 in (1.80 m)	160 lb (73 kg)	Dec 22, 2016
Jose Alvarado #34 PG	Recruit ratings: Scout: Rivals: 247Sports: ESPN:				
Moses Wright; PF	Raleigh, NC	Enloe High School	6 ft 9 in (2.06 m)	180 lb (82 kg)	Apr 8, 2017
Moses Wright; PF	Recruit ratings: Scout: Rivals: 247Sports: ESPN:				
Evan Cole; PF	Cumming, GA	South Forsyth High School	6 ft 8 in (2.03 m)	200 lb (91 kg)	May 2, 2017
Evan Cole; PF	Recruit ratings: Scout: Rivals: 247Sports: ESPN:				
Overall recruit ranking:
Note: In many cases, Scout, Rivals, 247Sports, On3, and ESPN may conflict in their listings of height and weight.; In these cases, the average was taken. ESPN grades are on a 100-point scale.; Sources: "2017 Team Ranking". Rivals.

=== 2018 Recruiting class ===
College recruiting information (2018)
Name	Hometown	School	Height	Weight	Commit date
Kristian Sjolund; SF	Katy, TX	Tompkins High School	6 ft 9 in (2.06 m)	190 lb (86 kg)	Aug 21, 2017
Kristian Sjolund; SF	Recruit ratings: Scout: Rivals: 247Sports: ESPN:				
Michael Devoe; SG	Orlando, FL	Montverde Academy	6 ft 4 in (1.93 m)	175 lb (79 kg)	Sep 23, 2017
Michael Devoe; SG	Recruit ratings: Scout: Rivals: 247Sports: ESPN:				
Khalid Moore; SF	Briarwood, NY	Archbishop Molly High School	6 ft 6 in (1.98 m)	175 lb (79 kg)	Oct 24, 2017
Khalid Moore; SF	Recruit ratings: Scout: Rivals: 247Sports: ESPN:				
Overall recruit ranking:
Note: In many cases, Scout, Rivals, 247Sports, On3, and ESPN may conflict in their listings of height and weight.; In these cases, the average was taken. ESPN grades are on a 100-point scale.; Sources: "2018 Team Ranking". Rivals.

== Roster ==
2017–18 Georgia Tech Yellow Jackets men's basketball team
Players
Coaches

Pos.	#	Name	Height	Weight	Year	Previous school	Hometown
G	0	Justin Moore	6 ft 4 in (1.93 m)	162 lb (73 kg)	So	Mission Bay HS	San Diego, CA
G	1	Tadric Jackson	6 ft 2 in (1.88 m)	203 lb (92 kg)	Sr	Tift County HS	Tifton, GA
G	2	Shembari Phillips (redshirt)	6 ft 3 in (1.91 m)	202 lb (92 kg)	Jr	Wheeler HS/Tucker HS; Tennessee	Atlanta, GA
F	3	Evan Cole	6 ft 9 in (2.06 m)	211 lb (96 kg)	Fr	South Forsyth HS	Cumming, GA
G	4	Brandon Alston	6 ft 5 in (1.96 m)	200 lb (91 kg)	Sr	Herndon HS; Lehigh	Vienna, VA
G	5	Josh Okogie	6 ft 5 in (1.96 m)	213 lb (97 kg)	So	Shiloh HS	Snellville, GA
G	10	Jose Alvarado	6 ft 0 in (1.83 m)	174 lb (79 kg)	Fr	Christ the King HS	Brooklyn, NY
F	11	Evan Jester (W)	6 ft 6 in (1.98 m)	180 lb (82 kg)	Fr	Sandy Creek HS	Riverdale, GA
F	12	Moses Wright	6 ft 9 in (2.06 m)	210 lb (95 kg)	Fr	William G. Enloe HS	Raleigh, NC
G	13	Curtis Haywood	6 ft 5 in (1.96 m)	198 lb (90 kg)	Fr	Mustang HS/Brewster Academy	Oklahoma City, OK
G	23	Jon Brown (W)	6 ft 5 in (1.96 m)	172 lb (78 kg)	Fr	Sports Leadership and Management Academy	Miami, FL
F	24	Sylvester Ogbonda	6 ft 10 in (2.08 m)	238 lb (108 kg)	RS So	National Christian Academy	Fort Washington, MD
C	32	Avi Schafer (W)	6 ft 8 in (2.03 m)	231 lb (105 kg)	RS Fr	Brewster Academy	Osaka, Japan
F	34	Abdoulaye Gueye	6 ft 9 in (2.06 m)	218 lb (99 kg)	RS Jr	Central Park Christian	Dakar, Senegal
C	44	Ben Lammers	6 ft 10 in (2.08 m)	231 lb (105 kg)	Sr	Alamo Heights HS	San Antonio, TX
G	55	Malachi Rice (W)	6 ft 0 in (1.83 m)	180 lb (82 kg)	Fr	Brebeuf Jesuit Prep	Indianapolis, IN

Head coach

- Josh Pastner (Arizona)

Assistant coach(es)

- Tavaras Hardy (Northwestern)
- Darryl LaBarrie (Georgia Tech)
- Eric Reveno (Stanford)

Legend

- (C) Team captain
- (S) Suspended
- (I) Ineligible
- (W) Walk-on
- Injured
- Current redshirt

Roster

== Schedule and results ==
Date time, TV	Rank^{#}	Opponent^{#}	Result	Record	High points	High rebounds	High assists	Site (attendance) city, state
Exhibition
Oct 28, 2017*; 12:00 pm		Georgia State; A-Town Showdown	L 58–65	–	14 – Lammers/Jackson	9 – Lammers	4 – Moore	McCamish Pavilion (2,112); Atlanta, GA
Nov 2, 2017*; 7:30 pm		Faulkner	W 78–60	–	17 – Wright	13 – Wright	6 – Alvarado	McCamish Pavilion (1,243); Atlanta, GA
Regular season
Nov 10, 2017*; 11:30 pm, ESPN		vs. No. 21 UCLA; Pac-12 China Game	L 60–63	0–1	24 – Lammers	10 – Lammers	3 – Alvarado	Baoshan Sports Centre (4,011); Shanghai, China
Nov 19, 2017*; 2:00 pm, ACCN Extra		Bethune–Cookman; Ramblin' Wreck Showcase	W 65–62	1–1	19 – Lammers	13 – Lammers	5 – Alvarado	McCamish Pavilion (5,154); Atlanta, GA
Nov 22, 2017*; 7:30 pm, ACCN Extra		Texas–Rio Grande Valley; Ramblin' Wreck Showcase	W 78–68	2–1	20 – Alston	7 – Lammers/Gueye	6 – Alvarado/Haywood	McCamish Pavilion (4,504); Atlanta, GA
Nov 24, 2017*; 4:00 pm, RSN		North Texas; Ramblin' Wreck Showcase	W 63–49	3–1	19 – Alvarado	7 – Alvarado	4 – Alvarado/Haywood	McCamish Pavilion (4,867); Atlanta, GA
Nov 28, 2017*; 7:00 pm, ESPN2		Northwestern; ACC–Big Ten Challenge	W 52–51	4–1	13 – Lammers	7 – Jackson	4 – Alvarado/Jackson	McCamish Pavilion (5,562); Atlanta, GA
Dec 1, 2017*; 7:30 pm, ACCN Extra		Grambling State; Ramblin' Wreck Showcase	L 63–64	4–2	22 – Alvarado	9 – Lammers	7 – Moore	McCamish Pavilion (4,925); Atlanta, GA
Dec 3, 2017*; 6:00 pm, ESPNU		Tennessee	L 70–77	4–3	17 – Lammers	9 – Lammers	6 – Haywood	McCamish Pavilion (6,514); Atlanta, GA
Dec 6, 2017*; 7:00 pm, ESPN3		at Wofford	L 60–63	4–4	26 – Jackson	7 – Lammers	3 – Haywood/Jackson	Benjamin Johnson Arena (2,419); Spartanburg, SC
Dec 17, 2017*; 4:00 pm, ESPNU		Florida A&M	W 79–54	5–4	19 – Okogie/Wright	8 – Lammers	7 – Alvarado	McCamish Pavilion (5,156); Atlanta, GA
Dec 19, 2017*; 9:00 pm, ESPN2		at Georgia; Rivalry	L 59–80	5–5	21 – Okogie	8 – Lammers	2 – Alvarado/Jackson	Stegeman Coliseum (10,048); Athens, GA
Dec 22, 2017*; 9:00 pm, RSN		Wright State	L 81–85	5–6	23 – Alvarado	10 – Lammers	3 – Alvarado	McCamish Pavilion (4,522); Atlanta, GA
Dec 27, 2017*; 7:20 pm, ACCN Extra		Coppin State	W 76-62	6–6	22 – Lammers	11 – Lammers	4 – Alston	McCamish Pavilion (5,341); Atlanta, GA
Dec 30, 2017; 2:00 pm, ESPN2		at Notre Dame	L 59–68	6–7 (0–1)	16 – Okogie	12 – Lammers	4 – Alston	Purcell Pavilion (8,441); South Bend, IN
Jan 3, 2018; 9:00 pm, RSN		No. 15 Miami (FL)	W 64–54	7–7 (1–1)	30 – Okogie	9 – Okogie	2 – Lammers/Alston/Jackson	McCamish Pavilion (5,568); Atlanta, GA
Jan 6, 2018*; 7:00 pm, ACCN Extra		Yale	W 74–60	8–7	23 – Alvarado	9 – Gueye	4 – Alvarado	McCamish Pavilion (6,630); Atlanta, GA
Jan 10, 2018; 7:00 pm, ESPNU		Notre Dame	W 60–53	9–7 (2–1)	17 – Okogie	10 – Lammers	5 – Okogie	McCamish Pavilion (7,771); Atlanta, GA
Jan 13, 2018; 2:00 pm, ACCN		at Pittsburgh	W 69–54	10–7 (3–1)	16 – Gueye	16 – Lammers	5 – Alston	Petersen Events Center (3,544); Pittsburgh, PA
Jan 18, 2018; 8:00 pm, ACCN		No. 2 Virginia	L 48–64	10–8 (3–2)	14 – Jackson	8 – Lammers	5 – Alvarado	McCamish Pavilion (8,600); Atlanta, GA
Jan 20, 2018; 2:00 pm, ESPN2		at No. 15 North Carolina	L 66–80	10–9 (3–3)	18 – Okogie	7 – Okogie	4 – Jackson	Dean Smith Center (20,334); Chapel Hill, NC
Jan 24, 2018; 7:00 pm, RSN		at Florida State	L 77–88	10–10 (3–4)	23 – Alvarado	16 – Okogie	5 – Okogie	Donald L. Tucker Civic Center (9,879); Tallahassee, FL
Jan 28, 2018; 6:00 pm, ESPNU		No. 18 Clemson	L 70–72	10–11 (3–5)	26 – Okogie	7 – Lammers	5 – Alvarado	McCamish Pavilion (8,600); Atlanta, GA
Jan 31, 2018; 8:00 pm, ACCN		Syracuse	W 55–51	11–11 (4–5)	20 – Okogie	12 – Lammers	5 – Alvarado	McCamish Pavilion (8,600); Atlanta, GA
Feb 4, 2018; 12:00 pm, ESPNU		at Boston College	L 72–80	11–12 (4–6)	14 – Lammers	12 – Lammers	4 – Alvarado	Conte Forum (4,763); Chestnut Hill, MA
Feb 8, 2018; 7:00 pm, ESPN2		at Louisville	L 54–77	11–13 (4–7)	25 – Okogie	10 – Okogie	4 – Alvarado	KFC Yum! Center (16,533); Louisville, KY
Feb 11, 2018; 6:00 pm, ESPN		No. 9 Duke	L 69–80	11–14 (4–8)	29 – Okogie	8 – Lammers	4 – Okogie	McCamish Pavilion (8,600); Atlanta, GA
Feb 14, 2018; 9:00 pm, RSN		at Wake Forest	L 62–79	11–15 (4–9)	20 – Okogie	8 – Lammers	4 – Jackson	LJVM Coliseum (6,133); Winston-Salem, NC
Feb 17, 2018; 12:00 pm, ESPN2		Virginia Tech	L 56–76	11–16 (4–10)	17 – Jackson	8 – Wright	4 – Alston	McCamish Pavilion (8,600); Atlanta, GA
Feb 21, 2018; 7:00 pm, ESPN2		at No. 1 Virginia	L 54–65	11–17 (4–11)	22 – Lammers	7 – Lammers/Wright	4 – Okogie	John Paul Jones Arena (13,873); Charlottesville, VA
Feb 24, 2018; 3:00 pm, ACCN		at No. 15 Clemson	L 67–75	11–18 (4–12)	22 – Okogie	8 – Okogie	6 – Okogie	Littlejohn Coliseum (9,000); Clemson, SC
Mar 1, 2018; 8:00 pm, ACCN		NC State	W 78–75	12–18 (5–12)	22 – Jackson	9 – Lammers	7 – Lammers	McCamish Pavilion (6,907); Atlanta, GA
Mar 3, 2018; 12:00 pm, RSN		Wake Forest	W 64–56	13–18 (6–12)	22 – Okogie	10 – Cole	4 – Jackson	McCamish Pavilion (7,422); Atlanta, GA
ACC tournament
Mar 6, 2018; 12:00 pm, ESPN2	(13)	vs. (12) Boston College; First Round	L 77–87	13–19	29 – Jackson	8 – Gueye	5 – Jackson	Barclays Center (10,612); Brooklyn, NY
*Non-conference game. ^{#}Rankings from AP Poll. (#) Tournament seedings in parentheses. All times are in Eastern Time.
