= 2017–18 NCAA Division I men's basketball season =

80th season of NCAA Division I men's basketball

- Preseason AP No. 1: Duke Blue Devils
- Regular season: November 10, 2017 – March 11, 2018
- NCAA Tournament: 2018
- Tournament dates: March 13, 2018 – April 2, 2018
- National Championship: Alamodome; San Antonio, Texas
- NCAA Champions: Villanova Wildcats
- Other champions: Penn State Nittany Lions (NIT), North Texas Mean Green (CBI), Northern Colorado Bears (CIT)
- Player of the Year (Naismith, Wooden): Jalen Brunson, Villanova Wildcats

The 2017–18 NCAA Division I men's basketball season began on November 10, 2017. The first tournament was the 2K Sports Classic and the season ended with the Final Four at the Alamodome in San Antonio, Texas, on April 2, 2018. Practices officially began on September 29, 2017.

== Rule changes ==
The following rule changes were proposed for the 2017–18 NCAA Division I men's basketball season:

- Expanding the coaches' box from 28 feet to 38 feet.
- Resetting the shot clock to 20 seconds when the ball is inbounded in the front court after a foul or violation (e.g. kicked ball) by the defense. If there are more than 20 seconds on the shot clock in this situation, the shot clock will not be reset. Previously the shot clock was reset to the full 30 seconds regardless of the time remaining on the shot clock.
- Allow referees to use instant replay in the final 2:00 of the second half and/or overtime to determine if a secondary defensive player was either inside or outside of the restricted arc. If the defender was inside the arc, a blocking foul will be called. If the defender is outside of the restricted area, then a player control foul (charge) will be called.
- Require a minimum of 0.3 seconds to be taken off the game clock when the ball is legally touched on a throw-in or other situation.
- Make throw-in spots more consistent in the front court.
- Redefine a "legal screen" to require the inside of the screener's feet be no wider than his shoulders.

The NCAA approved a number of experimental rule changes for use in the 2018 postseason NIT:

- Games were played in 10-minute quarters instead of 20-minute halves, matching current practice in NCAA women's basketball.
- The "one-and-one" foul shot was not used. Instead, starting with the fifth total foul in each quarter, non-shooting fouls by the defensive team resulted in two free throws, with the only exception being administrative technical fouls. This also matched current NCAA women's practice.
- The three-point line was extended to the current FIBA distance of 6.75 meters (22 ft 1.75 in) from the center of the basket, except where the arc approaches the sideline; the line was a minimum distance of 3 feet (0.91 m) from the sidelines.
- The free throw lane was extended to the 16-foot width used in NBA and FIBA play, instead of the NCAA standard of 12 feet.
- After an offensive rebound, the shot clock was reset to 20 seconds instead of 30.

== Season headlines ==
- May 9, 2017 – The Missouri Valley Conference (MVC) announced that it extended an invitation to Valparaiso University to take effect July 1, with negotiations between the parties ongoing. Under its terms, the Crusaders would replace Wichita State University, departing on the same date for the American Athletic Conference.
- May 10 – The NCAA announced its Academic Progress Rate (APR) sanctions for the 2017–18 school year. A total of 17 programs in 9 sports were declared ineligible for postseason play due to failure to meet the required APR benchmark, including the following four Division I men's basketball teams:
  - Alabama A&M
  - Grambling State
  - Savannah State
  - SE Missouri State
    - Savannah State was later granted a waiver by the NCAA to be able to compete in postseason play.
- May 25 – The MVC officially announced Valparaiso would join on July 1, as reported earlier in the month.
- June 15 – Following a prolonged investigation into the Louisville program, after claims by a self-described madam that she had provided strip shows and sex parties at the Cardinals' team residence, Minardi Hall, for Cardinals players and prospective recruits, the NCAA announced the following penalties, subject to a planned appeal by Louisville:
  - Four years of probation.
  - A reduction of four scholarships in all over the probation period, with Louisville choosing when to take the reductions.
  - Former director of basketball operations Andre McGee, who was found to have paid $10,000 from 2010 to 2014 in exchange for the parties, received a 10-year show-cause penalty.
  - Head coach Rick Pitino was suspended for the Cardinals' first five ACC games in the coming season.
  - Louisville was required to forfeit all money received from conference revenue sharing stemming from its appearances in the 2012–2015 NCAA tournaments.
  - All players who participated in the parties and played for Louisville were held to be ineligible. The school had 45 days to provide the NCAA with a list of games affected, and was to vacate any games in which ineligible players were involved. This would ultimately cost Louisville its 2013 national championship and 2012 Final Four appearance (see February 20), making Louisville the first Division I basketball champion (for either sex) to be stripped of its title.
- June 16 – The governing boards of the Indiana University and Purdue University systems gave final approval to the split of Summit League member Indiana University – Purdue University Fort Wayne (IPFW) into two separate institutions, ratifying a plan that both boards had approved in December 2016. On July 1, 2018, IU took over IPFW's degree programs in health sciences under the identity of Indiana University Fort Wayne, while Purdue took over all other degree programs as Purdue University Fort Wayne. The IPFW athletic program would continue in Division I and the Summit League, but represent only Purdue Fort Wayne. The athletic program branding was changed from Fort Wayne Mastodons to Purdue Fort Wayne Mastodons on June 18, 2018.
- June 28 – The Horizon League announced that IUPUI would move from the Summit League to replace Valparaiso effective July 1.
- August 24 – The University of Alaska Anchorage announced that the Great Alaska Shootout, which the school had hosted since 1978 and was the longest-running regular-season college basketball tournament, would be discontinued after this season.
- September 26 – The office of the United States Attorney for the Southern District of New York announced that 10 individuals, including assistant coaches at Arizona, Auburn, Oklahoma State, and USC, had been arrested on federal corruption charges. The accused were allegedly part of a scheme by which coaches accepted bribes to steer NBA-bound college players toward certain agents and financial advisers. Court documents also allege that an apparel company later identified as Adidas paid $100,000 to the family of an unnamed player to ensure his signing with an unnamed school that was later identified as Louisville.
- September 27 – In the first major fallout from the breaking bribery scandal, Louisville placed head coach Rick Pitino on unpaid administrative leave and athletic director Tom Jurich on paid administrative leave. Media reports indicated that both would be formally fired once contractual issues were sorted out. Assistant David Padgett was named interim head coach.
- September 28 – CBS News reported that Rick Pitino was the Louisville coach identified in court documents as "Coach-2", who was alleged to have spoken several times with an Adidas executive in the attempt to pay the family of a recruit in exchange for the player attending Louisville.
- November 6 – The Associated Press preseason All-American team was released. Michigan State forward Miles Bridges was the leading vote-getter (61 votes). Joining him on the team were Notre Dame forward Bonzie Colson (47 votes), Arizona guard Allonzo Trier (39), Villanova guard Jalen Brunson (33) and Missouri forward Michael Porter Jr. (30).
- November 27 – The Big West Conference announced that California State University, Bakersfield (CSU Bakersfield) and the University of California, San Diego (UC San Diego), already affiliate members, will join the conference in July 2020. CSU Bakersfield, a Big West beach volleyball member, will leave the Western Athletic Conference. UC San Diego, a member of Big West men's volleyball that will add women's water polo to its Big West membership in 2019–20, will transition from NCAA Division II and the California Collegiate Athletic Association; it will not be eligible for Division I national championships until the 2024–25 school year. (Note: UCSD will remain eligible for national championships in four of its sports during its transition to Division I. Men's and women's water polo and the coeducational sport of fencing have one national championship for all three NCAA divisions, while men's volleyball has a combined Division I/II national championship.)
- December 30 – On what ESPN called "the day college basketball went nuts", four top-10 teams lost—top-ranked Villanova, #3 Arizona State, #5 Texas A&M, and #10 TCU, with all except for A&M entering the day unbeaten. The end result marked the first time in the AP poll era (since 1948–49) that no major-college men's team was unbeaten before the new calendar year.
- February 12 – Virginia rose to #1 in the AP poll for the first time since 1982, becoming the first team in poll history to move up to the #1 ranking despite losing a game in the prior week. Despite the Cavaliers' overtime loss at home to Virginia Tech the previous weekend, the previous #1 and #3 teams, Villanova and Purdue, respectively, also lost at home.
- February 20 – The NCAA announced that it had denied Louisville's appeal of sanctions imposed in the wake of the basketball program's sex scandal, officially making the Cardinals the first Division I basketball program stripped of a national title.
- February 28 – Mountain West Conference commissioner Craig Thompson confirmed to the San Diego Union-Tribune that his conference had discussed potential expansion with six schools since August 2017, with current West Coast Conference member Gonzaga the only school he specifically named. Thompson added that if the MW added Gonzaga, it could do so possibly as early as the 2018–19 school year. In addition, while Thompson said that BYU had not contacted him about expansion, several sources indicated that the school may return to the MW, at least in non-football sports, if Gonzaga were to join.
- April 2 – Gonzaga athletic director Mike Roth notified the MW and WCC that the school would remain in the WCC for the immediate future. This followed WCC scheduling and revenue distribution changes that Gonzaga had long advocated.

=== Milestones and records ===
- During the season, the following players reached the 2,000-career-point milestone: Tennessee guard James Daniel III, Central Arkansas guard Jordan Howard, Marquette guard Andrew Rowsey, Murray State guard Jonathan Stark, Xavier guard Trevon Bluiett South Dakota State forward Mike Daum, Campbell guard Chris Clemons Creighton guard Marcus Foster, Fairfield guard Tyler Nelson, Davidson forward Peyton Aldridge, Troy guard Wesley Person, Eastern Washington swingman Bogdan Bliznyuk, Western Michigan guard Thomas Wilder and Butler forward Kelan Martin.
- November 11 – Mike Krzyzewski won his 1,000th game with Duke, becoming the first men's coach to reach that mark at one Division I school, as Duke beat Utah Valley 99–69.
- November 16 – Roy Williams became the first coach to win 400 games at two different schools (Kansas, North Carolina) as he led the Tar Heels to a victory over Bucknell.
- November 17 – Oregon head coach Dana Altman won his 600th career game in Division I, as his Ducks defeated Alabama State 114–56.
- December 19 – Oklahoma freshman point guard Trae Young tied the NCAA Division I single-game assists record (22) in a 105–68 victory over Northwestern State. He also scored 26 points, becoming the first player in 20 seasons to record a 20-point/20-assist game.
- January 2 – Lehigh's Kahron Ross became the Patriot League's all-time assist leader by recording his 600th assist in a loss to Navy. The previous record of 599 had been held by Holy Cross's Jave Meade since 2004. Earlier in the season, Ross had become Lehigh's all-time leader, passing Mackey McKnight.
- January 3 – Mike Brey became Notre Dame's all-time winningest coach, notching his 394th victory at the school with an 88–58 home win over North Carolina State. He passed Digger Phelps on the school's win list with the victory.
- January 17 – Chris Mack became Xavier's all-time winningest coach, notching his 203rd victory at his alma mater with an 88-82 home win over St. John's. He passed his former coach Pete Gillen on the school's list with the victory.
- February 11 – Houston guard Rob Gray became the American Athletic Conference′s all-time leading scorer, passing SMU's Nic Moore.
- February 22 – Drexel overcame a 53–19 first-half deficit to defeat Delaware 85–83. The 34-point deficit was the largest ever erased by a winning Division I men's team, surpassing a 32-point deficit erased by Duke in defeating Tulane in 1950.
- February 24 – Kansas defeated Texas Tech 74–72 to clinch at least a share of its 14th consecutive Big 12 regular-season title. This gave the Jayhawks sole possession of the Division I men's record for the most consecutive regular-season conference titles, breaking a tie with UCLA (1967–1979).
- March 1 – Virginia defeated Louisville by making 5 points in the final second (0.9) of regulation, including a buzzer beater three-point bank shot from De'Andre Hunter, in a comeback highly noted for its statistical improbability. The Virginia Cavaliers won 67–66 achieving the first 9-and-0 ACC road record in league history and first perfect league road mark since Duke went 8-and-0 in 2011–12.
- March 9 – Bogdan Bliznyuk of Eastern Washington became the Big Sky Conference's all-time leading scorer, passing Orlando Lightfoot's mark of 2,102 set in 1994. Earlier in the season, Bliznyuk claimed the school all-time scoring mark, passing Venky Jois' total of 1,803.
- March 16 – 16 seed UMBC upset top-seeded Virginia 74–54 in a first-round NCAA tournament game in Charlotte. The game marked the first time in history that a 16 seed defeated a top seed.

== Conference membership changes ==
Three schools joined new conferences for the 2017–18 season.

School	Former conference	New conference
IUPUI	Summit League	Horizon League
Valparaiso	Horizon League	Missouri Valley Conference
Wichita State	Missouri Valley Conference	American Athletic Conference

In addition to the schools changing conferences, the 2017–18 season was the last for four schools in their then-current conferences.

- North Dakota left the Big Sky Conference for the Summit League.
- Hampton and USC Upstate respectively left the Mid-Eastern Athletic Conference and Atlantic Sun Conference to become members of the Big South Conference.

== Arenas ==
=== New arenas ===
- DePaul played its first season at Wintrust Arena, replacing Allstate Arena.
- NJIT played its first season at the Wellness and Events Center, replacing Fleisher Center.
- UMBC began the season at the Retriever Activities Center, the team's home since 1973, before opening the new UMBC Event Center on February 3.
- Wofford played its first season at Jerry Richardson Indoor Stadium, replacing Benjamin Johnson Arena.

=== Arenas closing ===
- Elon played its final season at Alumni Gym, home to the Phoenix since 1949. The school opened the new Schar Center, with more than three times the capacity of Alumni Gym, for the 2018 women's volleyball season (which precedes the basketball season).
- Marquette's men's team played its final season at the BMO Harris Bradley Center, home to the Golden Eagles since 1988. The team continues to share an arena with the NBA's Milwaukee Bucks, both having started play in the new Fiserv Forum for the 2018–19 season.

=== Temporary arenas ===
Three Division I men's teams played the 2017–18 season in temporary homes due to renovation of their current venues. A fourth team moved its home schedule to what is normally an alternate home for the same reason. One additional team is playing in two temporary venues while its previous venue is being replaced by a completely new structure at the same site.

- Cincinnati, which normally plays at the on-campus Fifth Third Arena, shared Northern Kentucky's BB&T Arena.
- Houston was renovating Hofheinz Pavilion, which was renamed Fertitta Center once it reopened in December 2018, several months behind schedule. The Cougars played the 2017–18 season at Texas Southern's Health and Physical Education Arena, and remained there until Fertitta Center reopened.
- Northwestern played at Allstate Arena while Welsh–Ryan Arena was being renovated.
- Robert Morris closed the Charles L. Sewall Center, home to the Colonials since 1985, in June 2017. The UPMC Events Center is currently being built at the Sewall Center site and was originally scheduled to open in the middle of the 2018–19 basketball season. The Colonials played most of their 2017–18 home games at PPG Paints Arena in Downtown Pittsburgh, with another Pittsburgh venue, Duquesne's A. J. Palumbo Center, used when PPG Paints Arena was not available. (Due to construction delays, the new arena will not open until the summer of 2019; RMU chose instead to play its 2018–19 home games at the Student Recreation and Fitness Center, a building in the on-campus North Athletic Complex that opened in September 2017 as part of the arena project.)
- Villanova moved its entire home schedule, with one exception, to its alternate home of Wells Fargo Center during renovations to its on-campus home of The Pavilion, which was renamed Finneran Pavilion when it reopened for the 2018–19 season. The November 29 game against Big 5 rival Penn was played at Jake Nevin Field House, which had been the team's home before the Pavilion's initial 1986 opening.

== Season outlook ==
=== Preseason polls ===
The top 25 from the AP and USA Today Coaches polls.

AP
Ranking	Team
1	Duke (33)
2	Michigan State (13)
3	Arizona (18)
4	Kansas (1)
5	Kentucky
6	Villanova
7	Wichita State
8	Florida
9	North Carolina
10	USC
11	West Virginia
12	Cincinnati
13	Miami
14	Notre Dame
15	Minnesota
16	Louisville
17	Xavier
18	Gonzaga
19	Northwestern
20	Purdue
21	UCLA
22	Saint Mary's
23	Seton Hall
24	Baylor
25	Texas A&M

USA Today Coaches
Ranking	Team
1	Duke (20)
2	Michigan State (9)
3	Kansas
4	Kentucky
5	Arizona (2)
6	Villanova
7	Florida (1)
8	Wichita State
9	North Carolina
10	West Virginia
11	USC
12	Miami
13	Cincinnati
14	Notre Dame
15	Minnesota
16	Louisville
17	Xavier
18	UCLA
19	Gonzaga
20	Northwestern
21	Purdue
22	Saint Mary's
23	Seton Hall
24	Baylor
25	Alabama

== Regular season ==
=== Early-season tournaments ===
Name	Dates	Location	No. teams	Champion
2K Sports Classic	November 16–17	Madison Square Garden (Manhattan, NY)	4	Providence
Puerto Rico Tip-Off	November 16–17, 19	HTC Center (Conway, SC) (Note: The tournament was originally scheduled to be held at Coliseo Municipal Tomás Dones in Fajardo, Puerto Rico, but was moved to Coastal Carolina University due to major damage from Hurricane Maria. Coastal was chosen in part because its arena was available on every scheduled tournament day.)	8	Iowa State
Charleston Classic	November 16–17, 19	TD Arena (Charleston, SC)	8	Temple
The Islands of the Bahamas Showcase	November 17–19	Kendal Isaacs National Gymnasium (Nassau, BAH)	8	Vermont
Paradise Jam tournament	November 17–20	Vines Center; Lynchburg, VA (Note: The tournament was originally scheduled for the Sports and Fitness Center in Saint Thomas, US Virgin Islands, but was moved due to damage from hurricanes Irma and Maria. Organizers decided to solicit hosting bids from the eight participating teams, with Liberty selected as the substitute host on September 29.)	8	Colorado
Hall of Fame Tip Off	November 18–19	Mohegan Sun Arena (Uncasville, CT)	4	Texas Tech (Naismith) South Alabama (Springfield)
CBE Hall of Fame Classic	November 20–21	Sprint Center (Kansas City, MO)	4	Baylor
Legends Classic	November 20–21	Barclays Center (Brooklyn, NY)	4	Texas A&M
Cayman Islands Classic	November 20–22	John Gray Gymnasium (Cayman Islands)	8	Cincinnati
Gulf Coast Showcase	November 20–22	Germain Arena (Estero, FL)	8	Towson
Maui Invitational	November 20–22	Lahaina Civic Center (Lahaina, HI)	8	Notre Dame
MGM Resorts Main Event	November 20, 22	T-Mobile Arena (Las Vegas, NV)	8	Prairie View A&M (Middleweight) UNLV (Heavyweight)
Cancun Challenge	November 21–22	Moon Palace Golf & Spa Resort (Cancún, MX)	8	Montana State (Mayan) Louisiana Tech (Riviera)
Battle 4 Atlantis	November 22–24	Imperial Arena (Nassau, BAH)	8	Villanova
Great Alaska Shootout	November 22–25	Sullivan Arena (Anchorage, AK)	8	Central Michigan
NIT Season Tip-Off	November 23–24	Barclays Center (Brooklyn, NY)	4	Virginia
Las Vegas Invitational	November 23–24	Orleans Arena (Las Vegas, NV)	4	Arizona State & Rider
AdvoCare Invitational	November 23–24, 26	HP Field House (Lake Buena Vista, FL)	8	West Virginia
Phil Knight Invitational	November 23–24, 26	Veterans Memorial Coliseum & Moda Center (Portland, OR)	16	Michigan State (Victory Bracket); Duke (Motion Bracket)
Wooden Legacy	November 23–24, 26	Anaheim Convention Center (Anaheim, CA)	8	Washington State
Emerald Coast Classic	November 24–25	Emerald Coast Arena (Niceville, FL)	4	Tennessee Tech & TCU
Barclays Center Classic	November 24–25	Barclays Center (Brooklyn, NY)	4	Minnesota
Las Vegas Classic	December 22–23	Orleans Arena (Las Vegas, NV)	4	Radford (Visitors)
Diamond Head Classic	December 22–23, 25	Stan Sheriff Center (Honolulu, HI)	8	USC

=== Upsets ===
An upset is a victory by an underdog team. In the context of NCAA Division I men's basketball, this generally constitutes an unranked team defeating a team currently ranked in the Top 25. This list will highlight those upsets of ranked teams by unranked teams as well as upsets of #1 teams. Rankings are from the AP poll.

Bold type indicates winning teams in "true road games"—i.e., those played on an opponent's home court (including secondary homes, such as Intrust Bank Arena for Wichita State).

Winner	Score	Loser	Date	Tournament/event
**Creighton**	92–88	#20 Northwestern	November 15, 2017	Gavitt Tipoff Games
Texas Tech	85–49	#20 Northwestern	November 19, 2017	Hall of Fame Tip Off
Creighton	100–89	#23 UCLA	November 20, 2017	CBE Hall of Fame Classic
Tennessee	78–75^{OT}	#18 Purdue	November 22, 2017	Battle 4 Atlantis
NC State	90–84	#2 Arizona	November 22, 2017	Battle 4 Atlantis
Rhode Island	75–74	#20 Seton Hall	November 23, 2017	NIT Season Tip-Off
Western Kentucky	77–73	#18 Purdue	November 23, 2017	Battle 4 Atlantis
SMU	66–60	#2 Arizona	November 23, 2017	Battle 4 Atlantis
Washington State	84–79	#21 Saint Mary's	November 24, 2017	Wooden Legacy
Arizona State	102–86	#15 Xavier	November 24, 2017	Las Vegas Invitational
Georgia	83–81^{OT}	#21 Saint Mary's	November 26, 2017	Wooden Legacy
Purdue	66–57	#17 Louisville	November 28, 2017	ACC–Big Ten Challenge
Seton Hall	89–79	#22 Texas Tech	November 30, 2017	Under Armour Reunion
SMU	72–55	#14 USC	December 2, 2017	
**UCF**	65–62	#24 Alabama	December 3, 2017	
**Seton Hall**	79–77	#17 Louisville	December 3, 2017	Billy Minardi Classic
**Florida State**	83–66	#5 Florida	December 4, 2017	
**Ball State**	80–77	#9 Notre Dame	December 5, 2017	
Texas Tech	82–76^{OT}	#22 Nevada	December 5, 2017	
Arizona	67–64	#7 Texas A&M	December 5, 2017	Valley of the Sun Shootout
Nebraska	78–68	#14 Minnesota	December 5, 2017	
**Loyola (IL)**	65–59	#5 Florida	December 6, 2017	
**Washington**	74–65	#2 Kansas	December 6, 2017	Jayhawk Shootout
Oklahoma	85–83	#25 USC	December 8, 2017	Basketball Hall of Fame Classic
Boston College	89–84	#1 Duke	December 9, 2017	
Arkansas	95–79	#14 Minnesota	December 9, 2017	
Rutgers	71–65	#15 Seton Hall	December 16, 2017	
Oklahoma State	71–70	#19 Florida State	December 16, 2017	Orange Bowl Classic
Indiana	80–77^{OT}	#18 Notre Dame	December 16, 2017	Crossroads Classic
**Oklahoma**	91–83	#3 Wichita State	December 16, 2017	Intrust Bank Arena Showcase
Clemson	71–69	#22 Florida	December 16, 2017	Orange Bowl Classic
**Wofford**	79–75	#5 North Carolina	December 20, 2017	
San Diego State	72–70	#12 Gonzaga	December 21, 2017	
UCLA	83–75	#7 Kentucky	December 23, 2017	CBS Sports Classic
New Mexico State	63–54	#6 Miami	December 23, 2017	Diamond Head Classic
Arkansas	95–93^{OT}	#19 Tennessee	December 30, 2017	
Butler	101–93	#1 Villanova	December 30, 2017	
Alabama	79–57	#5 Texas A&M	December 30, 2017	
Auburn	94–84	#23 Tennessee	January 2, 2018	
Florida	83–66	#11 Texas A&M	January 2, 2018	
Mississippi State	78–75	#22 Arkansas	January 2, 2018	
Georgia Tech	64–54	#15 Miami	January 3, 2018	
Colorado	90–81^{OT}	#4 Arizona State	January 4, 2018	
Providence	81–72	#5 Xavier	January 6, 2018	
Colorado	80–77	#14 Arizona	January 6, 2018	
**LSU**	69–68	#11 Texas A&M	January 6, 2018	
Auburn	88–77	#22 Arkansas	January 6, 2018	
NC State	96–85	#2 Duke	January 6, 2018	
Ohio State	80–64	#1 Michigan State	January 7, 2018	
Marquette	84–64	#13 Seton Hall	January 9, 2018	
Louisville	73–69	#23 Florida State	January 10, 2018	
Texas	99–98^{2OT}	#16 TCU	January 10, 2018	
NC State	78–77	#19 Clemson	January 11, 2018	
**Oregon**	76–72	#11 Arizona State	January 11, 2018	
**Michigan**	82–72	#4 Michigan State	January 13, 2018	
Kansas State	87–69	#4 Oklahoma	January 16, 2018	
South Carolina	76–68	#18 Kentucky	January 16, 2018	
**SMU**	83–78	#7 Wichita State	January 17, 2018	
Alabama	76–71	#17 Auburn	January 17, 2018	
Texas	67–58	#8 Texas Tech	January 17, 2018	
Creighton	80–63	#19 Seton Hall	January 17, 2018	
Missouri	59–55	#21 Tennessee	January 17, 2018	
Stanford	86–77	#16 Arizona State	January 17, 2018	
**Saint Mary's**	74–71	#13 Gonzaga	January 18, 2018	
Nebraska	72–52	#23 Michigan	January 18, 2018	
Houston	73–59	#7 Wichita State	January 20, 2018	
Iowa State	70–52	#8 Texas Tech	January 20, 2018	
Oklahoma State	83–81^{OT}	#4 Oklahoma	January 20, 2018	
Kansas State	73–68	#24 TCU	January 20, 2018	
**Florida**	66–64	#18 Kentucky	January 20, 2018	
Virginia Tech	80–69	#10 North Carolina	January 22, 2018	
TCU	82–73	#7 West Virginia	January 22, 2018	
**South Carolina**	77–72	#20 Florida	January 24, 2018	
Wyoming	104–103^{2OT}	#23 Nevada	January 24, 2018	
**Penn State**	82–79	#13 Ohio State	January 25, 2018	
**Utah**	80–77^{OT}	#21 Arizona State	January 25, 2018	
**NC State**	95–91^{OT}	#10 North Carolina	January 27, 2018	
Alabama	80–73	#12 Oklahoma	January 27, 2018	Big 12/SEC Challenge
**Kentucky**	83–76	#7 West Virginia	January 27, 2018	Big 12/SEC Challenge
Georgia	72–60	#23 Florida	January 30, 2018	
Iowa State	93–77	#15 West Virginia	January 31, 2018	
Temple	81–79^{OT}	#16 Wichita State	February 1, 2018	
Washington	68–64	#25 Arizona State	February 1, 2018	
**Oklahoma State**	84–79	#7 Kansas	February 3, 2018	
St. John's	81–77	#4 Duke	February 3, 2018	The Garf
Missouri	69–60	#21 Kentucky	February 3, 2018	
**Alabama**	68–50	#23 Florida	February 3, 2018	
Texas	79–74	#12 Oklahoma	February 3, 2018	
Washington	78–75	#9 Arizona	February 3, 2018	
Northwestern	61–52	#20 Michigan	February 6, 2018	
**St. John's**	79–75	#1 Villanova	February 7, 2018	
**Texas A&M**	81–80	#8 Auburn	February 7, 2018	
**UNLV**	86–78	#23 Nevada	February 7, 2018	
**UCLA**	82–74	#13 Arizona	February 8, 2018	
**Oklahoma State**	88–85	#19 West Virginia	February 10, 2018	
Boston College	72–70	#25 Miami	February 10, 2018	
Baylor	80–64	#10 Kansas	February 10, 2018	
Iowa State	88–80	#17 Oklahoma	February 10, 2018	
Alabama	78–50	#15 Tennessee	February 10, 2018	
**Virginia Tech**	61–60^{OT}	#2 Virginia	February 10, 2018	
Texas A&M	85–74	#24 Kentucky	February 10, 2018	
Missouri	62–58	#21 Texas A&M	February 13, 2018	
Providence	76–71	#3 Villanova	February 14, 2018	
Florida State	81–79^{OT}	#11 Clemson	February 14, 2018	
Wisconsin	57–53	#6 Purdue	February 15, 2018	
Houston	67–62	#5 Cincinnati	February 15, 2018	
Penn State	79–56	#8 Ohio State	February 15, 2018	
San Francisco	70–63	#15 Saint Mary's	February 15, 2018	
St. Bonaventure	77–74	#16 Rhode Island	February 16, 2018	
**Texas**	77–66	#23 Oklahoma	February 17, 2018	
South Carolina	84–75	#10 Auburn	February 17, 2018	
Arkansas	94–75	#21 Texas A&M	February 17, 2018	
Georgia	73–62	#18 Tennessee	February 17, 2018	
Baylor	59–57	#7 Texas Tech	February 17, 2018	
Virginia Tech	65–58	#15 Clemson	February 21, 2018	
Oklahoma State	79–71	#6 Texas Tech	February 21, 2018	
Memphis	91–85	#23 Houston	February 22, 2018	
Creighton	89–83^{OT}	#3 Villanova	February 24, 2018	
Florida	72–66	#12 Auburn	February 24, 2018	
Oregon	98–93^{OT}	#14 Arizona	February 24, 2018	
NC State	92–72	#25 Florida State	February 25, 2018	
Virginia Tech	64–63	#5 Duke	February 26, 2018	
**Saint Joseph's**	78–48	#17 Rhode Island	February 27, 2018	
**Miami**	91–88	#9 North Carolina	February 27, 2018	
Arkansas	91–82	#14 Auburn	February 27, 2018	
Penn State	69–68	#13 Ohio State	March 2, 2018	Big Ten tournament
Davidson	63–61	#17 Rhode Island	March 2, 2018	
Florida	80–67	#23 Kentucky	March 3, 2018	
Texas	87–79^{OT}	#20 West Virginia	March 3, 2018	
Syracuse	55–52	#18 Clemson	March 3, 2018	
Oklahoma State	82–64	#6 Kansas	March 3, 2018	
**Marshall**	76–67	#24 Middle Tennessee	March 3, 2018	
San Diego State	79–74	#21 Nevada	March 3, 2018	
BYU	85–72	#20 Saint Mary's	March 5, 2018	West Coast tournament
Alabama	81–63	#16 Auburn	March 9, 2018	SEC tournament
Providence	75–72^{OT}	#3 Xavier	March 9, 2018	Big East tournament
San Diego State	90–73	#22 Nevada	March 9, 2018	Mountain West tournament
Arkansas	80–72	#23 Florida	March 9, 2018	SEC Tournament
Davidson	58–57	#25 Rhode Island	March 11, 2018	Atlantic 10 tournament
Kentucky	77–72	#13 Tennessee	March 11, 2018	SEC Tournament

In addition to the above listed upsets in which an unranked team defeated a ranked team, there were eleven non-Division I teams to defeat a Division I team this season. Bold type indicates winning teams in "true road games"—i.e., those played on an opponent's home court (including secondary homes).

Winner	Score	Loser	Date	Tournament/event
**Ouachita Baptist** (Division II)	81–79	Little Rock	November 11, 2017	
**LeTourneau** (Division III)	99–84	Northwestern State	November 12, 2017	Jamaica Classic
**Lynchburg** (Division III)	83–80	Norfolk State	November 13, 2017	
**Embry–Riddle (AZ)** (NAIA)	82–70	Northern Arizona	November 13, 2017	
**Concordia–St. Paul** (Division II)	69–55	Milwaukee	November 17, 2017	Black & Gold Shootout
Chaminade (Division II)	96–72	California	November 22, 2017	Maui Invitational
Alaska Anchorage (Division II)	78–73^{OT}	Santa Clara	November 23, 2017	Great Alaska Shootout
**Southern Nazarene** (Division II)	68–60	Oral Roberts	December 8, 2017	
LSU Shreveport (NAIA)	85–84	Northwestern State	December 16, 2017	Shreveport–Bossier Holiday Classic
**Elizabeth City State** (Division II)	76–67	Norfolk State	January 15, 2018	
**William Jewell** (Division II)	86–74	UMKC	January 23, 2018	

=== Conference winners and tournaments ===
Each of the 32 Division I athletic conferences ends its regular season with a single-elimination tournament. The team with the best regular-season record in each conference is given the number one seed in each tournament, with tiebreakers used as needed in the case of ties for the top seeding. The winners of these tournaments receive automatic invitations to the 2018 NCAA Division I men's basketball tournament.

Conference	Regular season first place	Conference player of the year	Conference coach of the Year	Conference tournament	Tournament venue (city)	Tournament winner
America East Conference	Vermont	Trae Bell-Haynes, Vermont	John Becker, Vermont & John Gallagher, Hartford	2018 America East men's basketball tournament	Campus sites	UMBC
American Athletic Conference	Cincinnati	Gary Clark, Cincinnati	Kelvin Sampson, Houston	2018 American Athletic Conference men's basketball tournament	Amway Center (Orlando, FL)	Cincinnati
Atlantic 10 Conference	Rhode Island	Jaylen Adams, St. Bonaventure & Peyton Aldridge, Davidson	Dan Hurley, Rhode Island	2018 Atlantic 10 men's basketball tournament	Capital One Arena (Washington, D.C.)	Davidson
Atlantic Coast Conference	Virginia	Marvin Bagley III, Duke	Tony Bennett, Virginia	2018 ACC men's basketball tournament	Barclays Center (Brooklyn, NY)	Virginia
Atlantic Sun Conference	Florida Gulf Coast	Brandon Goodwin, Florida Gulf Coast	Joe Dooley, Florida Gulf Coast	2018 Atlantic Sun men's basketball tournament	Campus sites	Lipscomb
Big 12 Conference	Kansas	Devonte' Graham, Kansas	Chris Beard, Texas Tech & Bill Self, Kansas	2018 Big 12 men's basketball tournament	Sprint Center (Kansas City, MO)	Kansas
Big East Conference	Xavier	Jalen Brunson, Villanova	Chris Mack, Xavier	2018 Big East men's basketball tournament	Madison Square Garden (Manhattan, NY)	Villanova
Big Sky Conference	Montana	Bogdan Bliznyuk, Eastern Washington	Travis DeCuire, Montana	2018 Big Sky Conference men's basketball tournament	Reno Events Center (Reno, NV)	Montana
Big South Conference	UNC Asheville	Xavier Cooks, Winthrop	Mike Jones, Radford	2018 Big South Conference men's basketball tournament	First round: Campus sites Quarterfinals/semifinals: #1 seed Final: Top surviving seed	Radford
Big Ten Conference	Michigan State	Keita Bates-Diop, Ohio State	Chris Holtmann, Ohio State	2018 Big Ten Conference men's basketball tournament	Madison Square Garden (New York City, NY)	Michigan
Big West Conference	UC Davis	T. J. Shorts, UC Davis	Jim Les, UC Davis	2018 Big West Conference men's basketball tournament	Honda Center (Anaheim, CA)	Cal State Fullerton
Colonial Athletic Association	Charleston (Note: Top seed in conference tournament) and Northeastern	Justin Wright-Foreman, Hofstra	Bill Coen, Northeastern	2018 CAA men's basketball tournament	North Charleston Coliseum (North Charleston, SC)	Charleston
Conference USA	Middle Tennessee	Nick King, Middle Tennessee	Steve Henson, UTSA	2018 Conference USA men's basketball tournament	Ford Center (Frisco, TX)	Marshall
Horizon League	Northern Kentucky	Kendrick Nunn, Oakland	Scott Nagy, Wright State	2018 Horizon League men's basketball tournament	Little Caesars Arena (Detroit, MI)	Wright State
Ivy League	Harvard and Penn	Seth Towns, Harvard	Steve Donahue, Penn	2018 Ivy League men's basketball tournament	Palestra (Philadelphia, PA)	Penn
Metro Atlantic Athletic Conference	Canisius and Rider	Jermaine Crumpton, Canisius & Kahlil Dukes, Niagara	Kevin Baggett, Rider	2018 MAAC men's basketball tournament	Times Union Center (Albany, NY)	Iona
Mid-American Conference	Buffalo (East) and Toledo (West)	Tre'Shaun Fletcher, Toledo	Nate Oats, Buffalo	2018 Mid-American Conference men's basketball tournament	First round: Campus sites Remainder: Quicken Loans Arena (Cleveland, OH)	Buffalo
Mid-Eastern Athletic Conference	Bethune–Cookman, Hampton and Savannah State	Brandon Tabb, Bethune–Cookman	Jay Joyner, North Carolina A&T	2018 MEAC men's basketball tournament	Norfolk Scope (Norfolk, VA)	North Carolina Central
Missouri Valley Conference	Loyola–Chicago	Clayton Custer, Loyolan (Illinois)	Porter Moser, Loyola (Illinois)	2018 Missouri Valley Conference men's basketball tournament	Scottrade Center (St. Louis, MO)	Loyola (Illinois)
Mountain West Conference	Nevada	Caleb Martin, Nevada	Eric Musselman, Nevada (coaches & media)	2018 Mountain West Conference men's basketball tournament	Thomas & Mack Center (Paradise, NV)	San Diego State
Northeast Conference	Wagner	Junior Robinson, Mount St. Mary's	Bashir Mason, Wagner	2018 Northeast Conference men's basketball tournament	Campus sites	LIU Brooklyn
Ohio Valley Conference	Murray State	Jonathan Stark, Murray State	Matt Figger, Austin Peay	2018 Ohio Valley Conference men's basketball tournament	Ford Center (Evansville, IN)	Murray State
Pac-12 Conference	Arizona	Deandre Ayton, Arizona	Mike Hopkins, Washington	2018 Pac-12 Conference men's basketball tournament	T-Mobile Arena (Paradise, NV)	Arizona
Patriot League	Bucknell	Zach Thomas, Bucknell	Matt Langel, Colgate	2018 Patriot League men's basketball tournament	Campus sites	Bucknell
Southeastern Conference	Auburn and Tennessee	Grant Williams, Tennessee (coaches); Yante Maten, Georgia (AP)	Rick Barnes, Tennessee	2018 SEC men's basketball tournament	Scottrade Center (St. Louis, MO)	Kentucky
Southern Conference	UNC Greensboro	Desonta Bradford, East Tennessee State (coaches) & Fletcher Magee, Wofford (media)	Wes Miller, UNC Greensboro	2018 Southern Conference men's basketball tournament	U.S. Cellular Center (Asheville, NC)	UNC Greensboro
Southland Conference	Nicholls State and Southeastern Louisiana	Jordan Howard, Central Arkansas	Richie Riley, Nicholls State	2018 Southland Conference men's basketball tournament	Leonard E. Merrell Center (Katy, TX)	Stephen F. Austin
Southwestern Athletic Conference	Grambling State (Note: Ineligible for postseason play)	Martaveous McKnight, Arkansas–Pine Bluff	Donte Jackson, Grambling State	2018 SWAC men's basketball tournament	Quarterfinals: Campus sites Semifinals and final: Delmar Fieldhouse (Houston, TX)	Texas Southern
Summit League	South Dakota State	Mike Daum, South Dakota State	T. J. Otzelberger, South Dakota State	2018 Summit League men's basketball tournament	Denny Sanford Premier Center (Sioux Falls, SD)	South Dakota State
Sun Belt Conference	Louisiana	D'Marcus Simonds, Georgia State	Bob Marlin, Louisiana	2018 Sun Belt Conference men's basketball tournament	Lakefront Arena (New Orleans, LA)	Georgia State
West Coast Conference	Gonzaga	Jock Landale, Saint Mary's	Mark Few, Gonzaga	2018 West Coast Conference men's basketball tournament	Orleans Arena (Paradise, NV)	Gonzaga
Western Athletic Conference	New Mexico State	Jemerrio Jones, New Mexico State	Chris Jans, New Mexico State	2018 WAC men's basketball tournament	Orleans Arena (Paradise, NV)	New Mexico State

=== Statistical leaders ===
Source for additional stats categories

**Points per game**			**Rebounds per game**			**Assists per game**			**Steals per game**		
Player	School	PPG	Player	School	RPG	Player	School	APG	Player	School	SPG
Trae Young	Oklahoma	27.4	Devontae Cacok	UNC Wilmington	13.5	Trae Young	Oklahoma	8.7	Joseph Chartouny	Fordham	3.34
Kendrick Nunn	Oakland	25.9	Jemerrio Jones	New Mexico St.	13.2	Emmett Naar	St. Mary's	7.9	Jevon Carter	West Virginia	3.03
Jordan Howard	C. Arkansas	25.1	Rokas Gustys	Hofstra	12.0	Jordan McLaughlin	USC	7.8	Matisse Thybulle	Washington	2.97
Chris Clemons	Campbell	24.9	Ángel Delgado	Seton Hall	11.8	Austin Luke	Belmont	7.5	Paris Collins	Jackson St.	2.92
Justin Wright-Foreman	Hofstra	24.4	Alize Johnson	Missouri St.	11.6	Markell Johnson	NC State	7.3	Brian Beard Jr.	FIU	2.90

**Blocked shots per game**			**Field goal percentage**			**Three-point field goal percentage**			**Free throw percentage**		
Player	School	BPG	Player	School	FG%	Player	School	3FG%	Player	School	FT%
Ajdin Penava	Marshall	3.94	Udoka Azubuike	Kansas	.770	Connor Burchfield	William & Mary	.520	Darnell Edge	Fairleigh Dickinson	.944
Mohamed Bamba	Texas	3.70	James Thompson IV	E. Michigan	.672	Andre Wolford	St. Francis (PA)	.495	Markus Howard	Marquette	.938
Sagaba Konate	West Virginia	3.22	Raasean Davis	NC Central	.671	Sam Hauser	Marquette	.487	Jacobi Boykins	Louisiana Tech	.915
Tai Odiase	UIC	3.11	Jehyve Floyd	Holy Cross	.668	Anthony Mathis	New Mexico	.473	Brandon Tabb	Bethune–Cookman	.914
Hayden Koval	C. Arkansas	3.09	Josh Cunningham	Dayton	.646	Carl Pierre	UMass	.472	David Cohn	William & Mary	.912

== Postseason ==
=== NCAA tournament ===
==== Tournament upsets ====
For this list, an "upset" is defined as a win by a team seeded 7 or more spots below its defeated opponent.

Date	Winner	Score	Loser	Region	Round
March 15	Buffalo (#13)	89–68	Arizona (#4)	South	First Round
March 16	UMBC (#16)	74–54	Virginia (#1)	South	First Round
March 16	Marshall (#13)	81–75	Wichita State (#4)	East	First Round
March 17	Loyola–Chicago (#11)	64–62	Tennessee (#3)	South	Second Round
March 18	Florida State (#9)	75–70	Xavier (#1)	West	Second Round
March 18	Syracuse (#11)	55–53	Michigan State (#3)	Midwest	Second Round

==== Final Four – Alamodome, San Antonio, TX ====
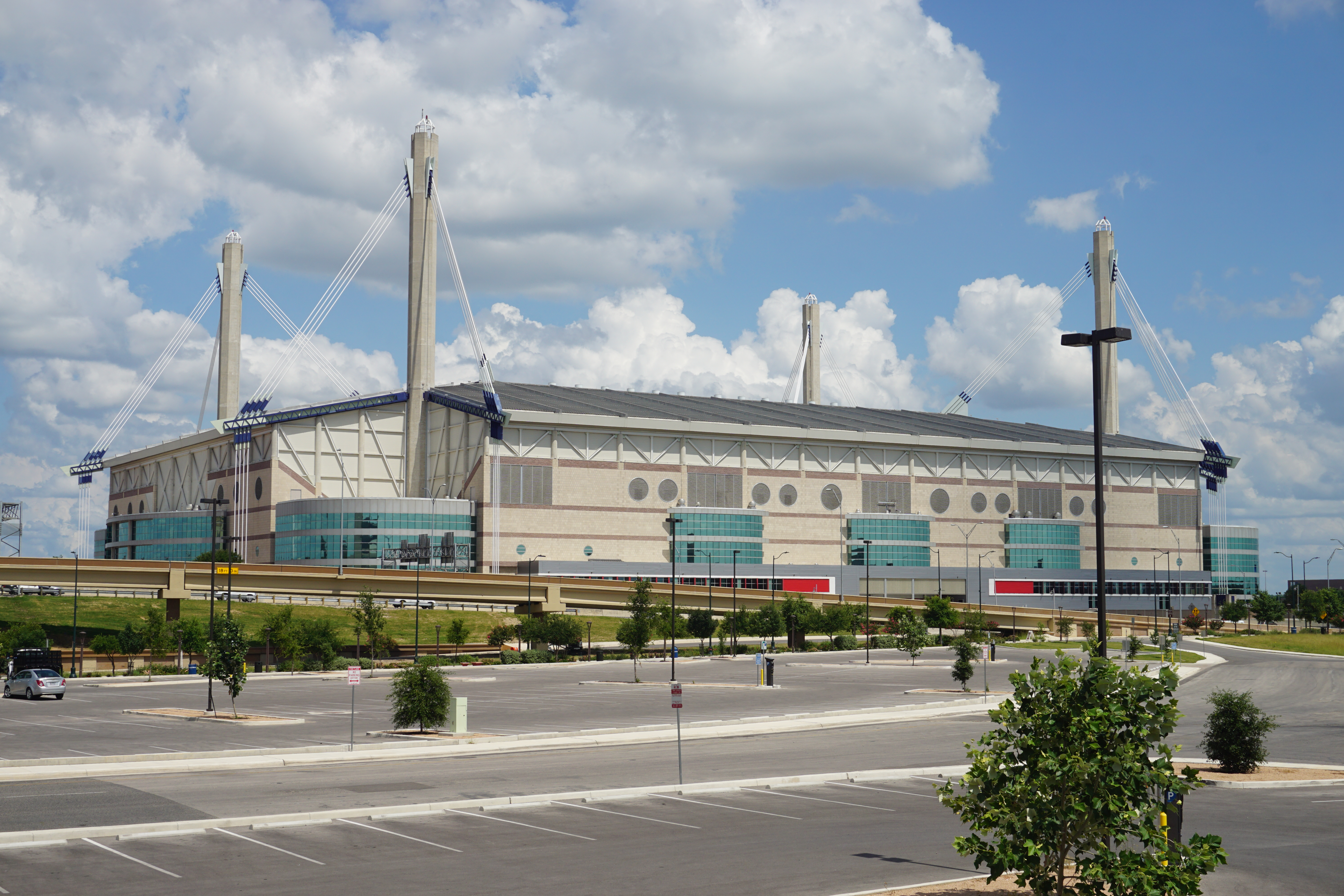
The Alamodome in San Antonio, Texas, hosted the NCAA men's Final Four.

National Semifinals; March 31
S11	Loyola–Chicago	57
W3	Michigan	69
MW1	Kansas	79
E1	Villanova	95

National Championship Game; April 2
W3	Michigan	62
E1	Villanova	79

=== National Invitation Tournament ===
After the NCAA tournament field was announced, the NCAA invited 32 teams to participate in the National Invitation Tournament. The tournament began on March 13, 2018 with all games prior to the semifinals being played at campus sites.

==== NIT Semifinals and Final ====
Played at Madison Square Garden in New York City on March 27 and 29

Semifinals; March 27
4	Western Kentucky	64
2	Utah	69
4	Penn State	75
4	Mississippi State	60

Championship game March 29
4	Penn State	82
2	Utah	66

=== College Basketball Invitational ===
The eleventh College Basketball Invitational (CBI) Tournament began on March 13, 2018. This tournament features 16 teams who were left out of the NCAA tournament and NIT.

Semifinals; March 22
North Texas	90
Jacksonville State	68
San Francisco	65
Campbell	62

Championship Series; March 26, 28, 30
North Texas	62	69	88
San Francisco	72	55	77

=== CollegeInsider.com Postseason tournament ===
The eighth CollegeInsider.com Postseason Tournament began on March 12, 2018 and ended with the championship game on March 30. This tournament places an emphasis on selecting successful teams from "mid-major" conferences who were left out of the NCAA tournament and NIT. 26 teams participate in this tournament.

Semifinals; March 28
UIC	67
Liberty	51
Sam Houston State	88
Northern Colorado	99

Championship; March 30
UIC	71
Northern Colorado	76

== Conference standings ==
2017–18 American Athletic Conference men's basketball standings
	Conf.				Overall
Team	W		L	PCT	W		L	PCT
No. 6 Cincinnati †	16	–	2	.889	31	–	5	.861
No. 16 Wichita State	14	–	4	.778	25	–	8	.758
No. 21 Houston	14	–	4	.778	27	–	8	.771
Tulsa	12	–	6	.667	19	–	12	.613
Memphis	10	–	8	.556	21	–	13	.618
UCF	9	–	9	.500	19	–	13	.594
Temple	8	–	10	.444	17	–	16	.515
UConn	7	–	11	.389	14	–	18	.438
SMU	6	–	12	.333	17	–	16	.515
Tulane	5	–	13	.278	14	–	17	.452
East Carolina	4	–	14	.222	10	–	20	.333
South Florida	3	–	15	.167	10	–	22	.313
† 2018 AAC tournament winner Rankings from AP poll

2017–18 America East Conference men's basketball standings
	Conf.				Overall
Team	W		L	PCT	W		L	PCT
Vermont	15	–	1	.938	27	–	8	.771
UMBC †	12	–	4	.750	25	–	11	.694
Hartford	11	–	5	.688	19	–	14	.576
Albany	10	–	6	.625	22	–	10	.688
Stony Brook	7	–	9	.438	13	–	19	.406
New Hampshire	6	–	10	.375	10	–	21	.323
UMass Lowell	6	–	10	.375	12	–	18	.400
Maine	3	–	13	.188	6	–	26	.188
Binghamton	2	–	14	.125	11	–	20	.355
† 2018 America East tournament winner

2017–18 Atlantic 10 men's basketball standings
	Conf.				Overall
Team	W		L	PCT	W		L	PCT
Rhode Island	15	–	3	.833	26	–	8	.765
St. Bonaventure	14	–	4	.778	26	–	8	.765
Davidson †	13	–	5	.722	21	–	12	.636
Saint Joseph's	10	–	8	.556	16	–	16	.500
VCU	9	–	9	.500	18	–	15	.545
Saint Louis	9	–	9	.500	17	–	16	.515
George Mason	9	–	9	.500	16	–	17	.485
Richmond	9	–	9	.500	12	–	20	.375
Dayton	8	–	10	.444	14	–	17	.452
Duquesne	7	–	11	.389	16	–	16	.500
George Washington	7	–	11	.389	15	–	18	.455
La Salle	7	–	11	.389	13	–	19	.406
Massachusetts	5	–	13	.278	13	–	20	.394
Fordham	4	–	14	.222	9	–	22	.290
† 2018 A10 Tournament winner Rankings from AP poll

2017–18 ASUN men's basketball standings
	Conf.				Overall
Team	W		L	PCT	W		L	PCT
Florida Gulf Coast	12	–	2	.857	23	–	12	.657
Lipscomb †	10	–	4	.714	23	–	10	.697
Jacksonville	8	–	6	.571	15	–	18	.455
NJIT	7	–	7	.500	14	–	16	.467
North Florida	7	–	7	.500	14	–	19	.424
Kennesaw State	6	–	8	.429	10	–	20	.333
Stetson	4	–	10	.286	12	–	20	.375
USC Upstate	2	–	12	.143	7	–	25	.219
† 2018 ASUN Tournament winner

2017–18 ACC men's basketball standings
	Conf.				Overall
Team	W		L	PCT	W		L	PCT
No. 1 Virginia †	17	–	1	.944	31	–	3	.912
No. 9 Duke	13	–	5	.722	29	–	8	.784
No. 22 Miami (FL)	11	–	7	.611	22	–	10	.688
No. 20 Clemson	11	–	7	.611	25	–	10	.714
NC State	11	–	7	.611	21	–	12	.636
No. 10 North Carolina	11	–	7	.611	26	–	11	.703
Virginia Tech	10	–	8	.556	21	–	12	.636
Florida State	9	–	9	.500	23	–	12	.657
Louisville	9	–	9	.500	22	–	14	.611
Notre Dame	8	–	10	.444	21	–	15	.583
Syracuse	8	–	10	.444	23	–	14	.622
Boston College	7	–	11	.389	19	–	16	.543
Georgia Tech	6	–	12	.333	13	–	19	.406
Wake Forest	4	–	14	.222	11	–	20	.355
Pittsburgh	0	–	18	.000	8	–	24	.250
† 2018 ACC tournament winner Rankings from AP poll

2017–18 Big East men's basketball standings
	Conf.				Overall
Team	W		L	PCT	W		L	PCT
No. 3 Xavier	15	–	3	.833	29	–	6	.829
No. 2 Villanova †	14	–	4	.778	36	–	4	.900
Seton Hall	10	–	8	.556	22	–	12	.647
Creighton	10	–	8	.556	21	–	12	.636
Providence	10	–	8	.556	21	–	14	.600
Butler	9	–	9	.500	21	–	14	.600
Marquette	9	–	9	.500	21	–	14	.600
Georgetown	5	–	13	.278	15	–	15	.500
St. John's	4	–	14	.222	16	–	17	.485
DePaul	4	–	14	.222	11	–	20	.355
† 2018 Big East tournament winner Rankings from AP poll

2017–18 Big Sky men's basketball standings
	Conf.				Overall
Team	W		L	PCT	W		L	PCT
Montana †	16	–	2	.889	26	–	8	.765
Idaho	14	–	4	.778	22	–	9	.710
Weber State	13	–	5	.722	20	–	11	.645
Eastern Washington	13	–	5	.722	20	–	15	.571
Northern Colorado	11	–	7	.611	26	–	12	.684
Idaho State	9	–	9	.500	14	–	16	.467
Portland State	9	–	9	.500	20	–	14	.588
Montana State	6	–	12	.333	13	–	19	.406
North Dakota	6	–	12	.333	12	–	20	.375
Southern Utah	5	–	13	.278	13	–	19	.406
Sacramento State	4	–	14	.222	7	–	25	.219
Northern Arizona	2	–	16	.111	5	–	27	.156
† Conference tournament winner

2017–18 Big South men's basketball standings
	Conf.				Overall
Team	W		L	PCT	W		L	PCT
UNC Asheville	13	–	5	.722	21	–	13	.618
Radford †	12	–	6	.667	23	–	13	.639
Winthrop	12	–	6	.667	19	–	12	.613
Campbell	10	–	8	.556	18	–	16	.529
Liberty	9	–	9	.500	22	–	15	.595
Charleston Southern	9	–	9	.500	15	–	16	.484
High Point	9	–	9	.500	14	–	16	.467
Gardner–Webb	9	–	9	.500	14	–	18	.438
Presbyterian	4	–	14	.222	11	–	21	.344
Longwood	3	–	15	.167	7	–	26	.212
† 2018 Big South tournament winner

2017–18 Big Ten Conference men's basketball standings
	Conf.				Overall
Team	W		L	PCT	W		L	PCT
No. 5 Michigan State	16	–	2	.889	30	–	5	.857
No. 11 Purdue	15	–	3	.833	30	–	7	.811
No. 17 Ohio State	15	–	3	.833	25	–	9	.735
No. 7 Michigan †	13	–	5	.722	33	–	8	.805
Nebraska	13	–	5	.722	22	–	11	.667
Penn State	9	–	9	.500	26	–	13	.667
Indiana	9	–	9	.500	16	–	15	.516
Maryland	8	–	10	.444	19	–	13	.594
Wisconsin	7	–	11	.389	15	–	18	.455
Northwestern	6	–	12	.333	15	–	17	.469
Minnesota	4	–	14	.222	15	–	17	.469
Illinois	4	–	14	.222	14	–	18	.438
Iowa	4	–	14	.222	14	–	19	.424
Rutgers	3	–	15	.167	15	–	19	.441
† 2018 Big Ten tournament winner Rankings from AP poll

2017–18 Big West men's basketball standings
	Conf.				Overall
Team	W		L	PCT	W		L	PCT
UC Davis	12	–	4	.750	22	–	11	.667
UC Santa Barbara	11	–	5	.688	23	–	9	.719
UC Irvine	11	–	5	.688	18	–	17	.514
Cal State Fullerton †	10	–	6	.625	20	–	12	.625
Long Beach State	9	–	7	.563	15	–	18	.455
Hawai'i	8	–	8	.500	17	–	13	.567
Cal Poly	4	–	12	.250	9	–	22	.290
UC Riverside	4	–	12	.250	9	–	22	.290
Cal State Northridge	3	–	13	.188	6	–	24	.200
† 2018 Big West tournament winner

2017–18 Big 12 men's basketball standings
	Conf.				Overall
Team	W		L	PCT	W		L	PCT
No. 4 Kansas †	13	–	5	.722	31	–	8	.795
No. 14 Texas Tech	11	–	7	.611	27	–	10	.730
No. 15 West Virginia	11	–	7	.611	26	–	11	.703
Kansas State	10	–	8	.556	25	–	12	.676
TCU	9	–	9	.500	21	–	12	.636
Baylor	8	–	10	.444	19	–	15	.559
Texas	8	–	10	.444	19	–	15	.559
Oklahoma State	8	–	10	.444	21	–	15	.583
Oklahoma	8	–	10	.444	18	–	14	.563
Iowa State	4	–	14	.222	13	–	18	.419
† 2018 Big 12 Tournament winner Rankings from AP poll

2017–18 CAA men's basketball standings
	Conf.				Overall
Team	W		L	PCT	W		L	PCT
College of Charleston †	14	–	4	.778	26	–	8	.765
Northeastern	14	–	4	.778	23	–	10	.697
Hofstra	12	–	6	.667	19	–	12	.613
William & Mary	11	–	7	.611	19	–	12	.613
Towson	8	–	10	.444	18	–	14	.563
UNC Wilmington	7	–	11	.389	11	–	21	.344
Delaware	6	–	12	.333	14	–	19	.424
Drexel	6	–	12	.333	13	–	20	.394
James Madison	6	–	12	.333	10	–	22	.313
Elon	6	–	12	.333	14	–	18	.438
† 2018 CAA tournament winner

2017–18 Conference USA men's basketball standings
	Conf.				Overall
Team	W		L	PCT	W		L	PCT
Middle Tennessee	16	–	2	.889	25	–	8	.758
Old Dominion	15	–	3	.833	25	–	7	.781
Western Kentucky	14	–	4	.778	27	–	11	.711
Marshall †	12	–	6	.667	25	–	11	.694
UTSA	11	–	7	.611	20	–	15	.571
UAB	10	–	8	.556	20	–	13	.606
North Texas	8	–	10	.444	20	–	18	.526
FIU	8	–	10	.444	14	–	18	.438
Southern Miss	7	–	11	.389	16	–	18	.471
Louisiana Tech	7	–	11	.389	17	–	16	.515
Florida Atlantic	6	–	12	.333	12	–	19	.387
UTEP	6	–	12	.333	11	–	20	.355
Rice	4	–	14	.222	7	–	24	.226
Charlotte	2	–	16	.111	6	–	23	.207
† 2018 C-USA Tournament winner

2017–18 Horizon League men's basketball standings
	Conf.				Overall
Team	W		L	PCT	W		L	PCT
Northern Kentucky	15	–	3	.833	22	–	10	.688
Wright State †	14	–	4	.778	25	–	10	.714
UIC	12	–	6	.667	20	–	16	.556
Oakland	10	–	8	.556	19	–	14	.576
Milwaukee	8	–	10	.444	16	–	17	.485
IUPUI	8	–	10	.444	11	–	19	.367
Green Bay	7	–	11	.389	13	–	20	.394
Cleveland State	6	–	12	.333	12	–	23	.343
Youngstown State	6	–	12	.333	8	–	24	.250
Detroit	4	–	14	.222	8	–	24	.250
† 2018 Horizon League Tournament winner

2017–18 Ivy League men's basketball standings
	Conf.				Overall
Team	W		L	PCT	W		L	PCT
x-Harvard	12	–	2	.857	18	–	14	.563
x-Penn †	12	–	2	.857	24	–	9	.727
Yale	9	–	5	.643	16	–	15	.516
Cornell	6	–	8	.429	12	–	16	.429
Princeton	5	–	9	.357	13	–	16	.448
Columbia	5	–	9	.357	8	–	19	.296
Brown	4	–	10	.286	11	–	16	.407
Dartmouth	3	–	11	.214	7	–	20	.259
† 2018 Ivy League Tournament winner x – Ivy League co-champions

2017–18 Mid-American Conference men's basketball standings
	Conf.				Overall
Team	W		L	PCT	W		L	PCT
East
Buffalo †	15	–	3	.833	27	–	9	.750
Kent State	9	–	9	.500	17	–	17	.500
Miami (OH)	8	–	10	.444	16	–	18	.471
Bowling Green	7	–	11	.389	16	–	16	.500
Ohio	7	–	11	.389	14	–	17	.452
Akron	6	–	12	.333	14	–	18	.438
West
Toledo	13	–	5	.722	23	–	11	.676
Eastern Michigan	11	–	7	.611	22	–	13	.629
Ball State	10	–	8	.556	19	–	13	.594
Western Michigan	9	–	9	.500	17	–	15	.531
Central Michigan	7	–	11	.389	21	–	15	.583
Northern Illinois	6	–	12	.333	13	–	19	.406
† 2018 MAC tournament winner

2017–18 MAAC men's basketball standings
	Conf.				Overall
Team	W		L	PCT	W		L	PCT
Rider	15	–	3	.833	22	–	10	.688
Canisius	15	–	3	.833	21	–	12	.636
Niagara	12	–	6	.667	19	–	14	.576
Iona †	11	–	7	.611	20	–	14	.588
Manhattan	9	–	9	.500	14	–	17	.452
Fairfield	9	–	9	.500	17	–	16	.515
Quinnipiac	7	–	11	.389	12	–	21	.364
Monmouth	7	–	11	.389	11	–	20	.355
Saint Peter's	6	–	12	.333	14	–	18	.438
Siena	4	–	14	.222	8	–	24	.250
Marist	4	–	14	.222	6	–	25	.194
† 2018 MAAC tournament winner

2017–18 MEAC men's basketball standings
	Conf.				Overall
Team	W		L	PCT	W		L	PCT
Hampton	12	–	4	.750	19	–	16	.543
Bethune–Cookman	12	–	4	.750	18	–	14	.563
Savannah State	12	–	4	.750	15	–	17	.469
North Carolina A&T	11	–	5	.688	20	–	15	.571
Norfolk State	11	–	5	.688	14	–	19	.424
North Carolina Central †	9	–	7	.563	19	–	16	.543
Morgan State	7	–	9	.438	13	–	19	.406
Howard	7	–	9	.438	10	–	23	.303
Florida A&M	7	–	9	.438	9	–	25	.265
South Carolina State	6	–	10	.375	10	–	22	.313
Coppin State	5	–	11	.313	5	–	27	.156
Maryland Eastern Shore	3	–	13	.188	7	–	25	.219
Delaware State	2	–	14	.125	4	–	28	.125
† 2018 MEAC tournament winner

2017–18 Missouri Valley Conference men's basketball standings
	Conf.				Overall
Team	W		L	PCT	W		L	PCT
Loyola Chicago †	15	–	3	.833	32	–	6	.842
Southern Illinois	11	–	7	.611	20	–	13	.606
Illinois State	10	–	8	.556	18	–	15	.545
Drake	10	–	8	.556	17	–	17	.500
Bradley	9	–	9	.500	20	–	13	.606
Indiana State	8	–	10	.444	13	–	18	.419
Missouri State	7	–	11	.389	18	–	15	.545
Evansville	7	–	11	.389	17	–	15	.531
Northern Iowa	7	–	11	.389	16	–	16	.500
Valparaiso	6	–	12	.333	15	–	17	.469
† 2018 MVC tournament winner

2017–18 Mountain West Conference men's basketball standings
	Conf.				Overall
Team	W		L	PCT	W		L	PCT
No. 24 Nevada	15	–	3	.833	29	–	8	.784
Boise State	13	–	5	.722	23	–	9	.719
New Mexico	12	–	6	.667	19	–	15	.559
Fresno State	11	–	7	.611	21	–	11	.656
San Diego State †	11	–	7	.611	22	–	11	.667
Wyoming	10	–	8	.556	20	–	13	.606
UNLV	8	–	10	.444	20	–	13	.606
Utah State	8	–	10	.444	17	–	17	.500
Air Force	6	–	12	.333	12	–	19	.387
Colorado State	4	–	14	.222	11	–	21	.344
San Jose State	1	–	17	.056	4	–	26	.133
† Conference tournament winner Rankings from AP poll

2017–18 Northeast Conference men's basketball standings
	Conf.				Overall
Team	W		L	PCT	W		L	PCT
Wagner	14	–	4	.778	23	–	10	.697
Saint Francis (PA)	12	–	6	.667	18	–	13	.581
Mount St. Mary's	12	–	6	.667	18	–	14	.563
LIU Brooklyn †	10	–	8	.556	18	–	17	.514
St. Francis Brooklyn	10	–	8	.556	13	–	18	.419
Robert Morris	9	–	9	.500	16	–	17	.485
Fairleigh Dickinson	9	–	9	.500	13	–	18	.419
Central Connecticut	7	–	11	.389	14	–	18	.438
Sacred Heart	5	–	13	.278	10	–	21	.323
Bryant	2	–	16	.111	3	–	28	.097
† 2018 NEC tournament winner

2017–18 Ohio Valley Conference men's basketball standings
	Conf.				Overall
Team	W		L	PCT	W		L	PCT
Murray State †	16	–	2	.889	26	–	6	.813
Belmont	15	–	3	.833	24	–	9	.727
Austin Peay	12	–	6	.667	19	–	15	.559
Jacksonville State	11	–	7	.611	23	–	13	.639
Tennessee Tech	10	–	8	.556	19	–	14	.576
Tennessee State	10	–	8	.556	15	–	15	.500
Southeast Missouri State*	8	–	10	.444	14	–	17	.452
Eastern Illinois	7	–	11	.389	12	–	19	.387
SIU Edwardsville	5	–	13	.278	9	–	21	.300
UT Martin	5	–	13	.278	10	–	21	.323
Eastern Kentucky	5	–	13	.278	11	–	20	.355
Morehead State	4	–	14	.222	8	–	21	.276
† 2018 OVC tournament winner *ineligible for postseason due to APR violations

2017–18 Pac-12 Conference men's basketball standings
	Conf.				Overall
Team	W		L	PCT	W		L	PCT
No. 12 Arizona †	14	–	4	.778	27	–	8	.771
USC	12	–	6	.667	24	–	12	.667
UCLA	11	–	7	.611	21	–	12	.636
Utah	11	–	7	.611	23	–	12	.657
Stanford	11	–	7	.611	19	–	16	.543
Oregon	10	–	8	.556	23	–	13	.639
Washington	10	–	8	.556	21	–	13	.618
Colorado	8	–	10	.444	17	–	15	.531
Arizona State	8	–	10	.444	20	–	12	.625
Oregon State	7	–	11	.389	16	–	16	.500
Washington State	4	–	14	.222	12	–	19	.387
California	2	–	16	.111	8	–	24	.250
† Pac-12 Tournament winner Rankings from AP poll

2017–18 Patriot League men's basketball standings
	Conf.				Overall
Team	W		L	PCT	W		L	PCT
Bucknell †	16	–	2	.889	25	–	10	.714
Colgate	12	–	6	.667	19	–	14	.576
Navy	11	–	7	.611	20	–	12	.625
Lehigh	11	–	7	.611	16	–	14	.533
Boston University	10	–	8	.556	15	–	16	.484
Holy Cross	8	–	10	.444	12	–	19	.387
Lafayette	7	–	11	.389	10	–	21	.323
Army	6	–	12	.333	13	–	17	.433
Loyola (MD)	6	–	12	.333	9	–	22	.290
American	3	–	15	.167	6	–	24	.200
† 2018 Patriot League tournament winner

2017–18 Southern Conference men's basketball standings
	Conf.				Overall
Team	W		L	PCT	W		L	PCT
UNC Greensboro †	15	–	3	.833	27	–	8	.771
East Tennessee State	14	–	4	.778	25	–	9	.735
Furman	13	–	5	.722	23	–	10	.697
Mercer	11	–	7	.611	19	–	15	.559
Wofford	11	–	7	.611	21	–	13	.618
Western Carolina	8	–	10	.444	13	–	19	.406
Samford	6	–	12	.333	10	–	22	.313
The Citadel	5	–	13	.278	11	–	21	.344
VMI	4	–	14	.222	9	–	21	.300
Chattanooga	3	–	15	.167	10	–	23	.303
† 2018 SoCon Tournament winner

2017–18 Southland Conference men's basketball standings
	Conf.				Overall
Team	W		L	PCT	W		L	PCT
Southeastern Louisiana	15	–	3	.833	22	–	12	.647
Nicholls State	15	–	3	.833	21	–	11	.656
Stephen F. Austin †	14	–	4	.778	28	–	7	.800
Sam Houston State	12	–	6	.667	21	–	15	.583
Lamar	11	–	7	.611	19	–	14	.576
New Orleans	11	–	7	.611	16	–	17	.485
Central Arkansas	10	–	8	.556	18	–	17	.514
Abilene Christian	8	–	10	.444	16	–	16	.500
Texas A&M–CC	8	–	10	.444	11	–	18	.379
McNeese State	8	–	10	.444	11	–	17	.393
Incarnate Word	2	–	16	.111	7	–	21	.250
Houston Baptist	2	–	16	.111	6	–	25	.194
Northwestern State	1	–	17	.056	4	–	25	.138
† 2018 Southland tournament winner

2017–18 Southeastern Conference men's basketball standings
	Conf.				Overall
Team	W		L	PCT	W		L	PCT
No. 19 Auburn	13	–	5	.722	26	–	8	.765
No. 13 Tennessee	13	–	5	.722	26	–	9	.743
No. 23 Florida	11	–	7	.611	21	–	13	.618
No. 18 Kentucky †	10	–	8	.556	26	–	11	.703
Missouri	10	–	8	.556	20	–	13	.606
Arkansas	10	–	8	.556	23	–	12	.657
Mississippi State	9	–	9	.500	25	–	12	.676
Texas A&M	9	–	9	.500	22	–	13	.629
Alabama	8	–	10	.444	20	–	16	.556
LSU	8	–	10	.444	18	–	15	.545
Georgia	7	–	11	.389	18	–	15	.545
South Carolina	7	–	11	.389	17	–	16	.515
Vanderbilt	6	–	12	.333	12	–	20	.375
Ole Miss	5	–	13	.278	12	–	20	.375
† 2018 SEC tournament winner Rankings from AP poll

2017–18 SWAC men's basketball standings
	Conf.				Overall
Team	W		L	PCT	W		L	PCT
Grambling State*	13	–	5	.722	17	–	14	.548
Prairie View A&M	12	–	6	.667	16	–	18	.471
Texas Southern †	12	–	6	.667	16	–	20	.444
Arkansas–Pine Bluff	12	–	6	.667	14	–	21	.400
Southern	10	–	8	.556	15	–	18	.455
Jackson State	9	–	9	.500	12	–	20	.375
Alabama State	8	–	10	.444	8	–	23	.258
Alcorn State	7	–	11	.389	11	–	21	.344
Mississippi Valley State	4	–	14	.222	4	–	28	.125
Alabama A&M*	3	–	15	.167	3	–	28	.097
† 2018 SWAC tournament winner *ineligible for postseason due to APR violations

2017–18 Sun Belt Conference men's basketball standings
	Conf.				Overall
Team	W		L	PCT	W		L	PCT
Louisiana	16	–	2	.889	27	–	7	.794
Georgia State †	12	–	6	.667	24	–	11	.686
Georgia Southern	11	–	7	.611	21	–	12	.636
Texas–Arlington	10	–	8	.556	21	–	13	.618
Louisiana–Monroe	9	–	9	.500	16	–	16	.500
Troy	9	–	9	.500	16	–	17	.485
Appalachian State	9	–	9	.500	15	–	18	.455
Coastal Carolina	8	–	10	.444	14	–	18	.438
South Alabama	7	–	11	.389	14	–	18	.438
Texas State	7	–	11	.389	15	–	18	.455
Arkansas State	6	–	12	.333	11	–	21	.344
Little Rock	4	–	14	.222	7	–	25	.219
† 2018 Sun Belt Conference tournament winner

2017–18 Summit League men's basketball standings
	Conf.				Overall
Team	W		L	PCT	W		L	PCT
South Dakota State †	13	–	1	.929	28	–	7	.800
South Dakota	11	–	3	.786	26	–	9	.743
Denver	8	–	6	.571	15	–	15	.500
Fort Wayne	7	–	7	.500	18	–	15	.545
North Dakota State	5	–	9	.357	15	–	17	.469
Oral Roberts	5	–	9	.357	11	–	21	.344
Omaha	4	–	10	.286	9	–	22	.290
Western Illinois	3	–	11	.214	12	–	16	.429
† 2018 Summit League Tournament winner

2017–18 West Coast Conference men's basketball standings
	Conf.				Overall
Team	W		L	PCT	W		L	PCT
No. 8 Gonzaga †	17	–	1	.944	32	–	5	.865
No. 25 Saint Mary's	16	–	2	.889	30	–	6	.833
BYU	11	–	7	.611	24	–	11	.686
San Diego	9	–	9	.500	20	–	14	.588
San Francisco	9	–	9	.500	22	–	17	.564
Pacific	9	–	9	.500	14	–	18	.438
Santa Clara	8	–	10	.444	11	–	20	.355
Loyola Marymount	5	–	13	.278	11	–	20	.355
Portland	4	–	14	.222	10	–	22	.313
Pepperdine	2	–	16	.111	6	–	26	.188
† Conference tournament winner Rankings from AP poll

2017–18 WAC men's basketball standings
	Conf.				Overall
Team	W		L	PCT	W		L	PCT
New Mexico State †	12	–	2	.857	28	–	6	.824
Utah Valley	10	–	4	.714	23	–	11	.676
Grand Canyon	9	–	5	.643	22	–	12	.647
Seattle	8	–	6	.571	20	–	14	.588
Texas–Rio Grande Valley	6	–	8	.429	15	–	18	.455
Cal State Bakersfield	5	–	9	.357	12	–	18	.400
UMKC	5	–	9	.357	10	–	22	.313
Chicago State	1	–	13	.071	3	–	29	.094
† 2018 WAC tournament winner

== Award winners ==
=== 2018 Consensus All-America team ===
Consensus First Team
Player	Position	Class	Team
Deandre Ayton	PF/C	Freshman	Arizona
Marvin Bagley III	PF	Freshman	Duke
Jalen Brunson	PG	Junior	Villanova
Devonte' Graham	PG	Senior	Kansas
Trae Young	PG	Freshman	Oklahoma

Consensus Second Team
Player	Position	Class	Team
Keita Bates-Diop	SF	Junior	Ohio State
Trevon Bluiett	SG	Senior	Xavier
Miles Bridges	SF	Sophomore	Michigan State
Jevon Carter	PG	Senior	West Virginia
Keenan Evans	PG	Senior	Texas Tech
Jock Landale	C	Senior	Saint Mary's

=== Major player of the year awards ===
- Wooden Award: Jalen Brunson, Villanova
- Naismith Award: Jalen Brunson, Villanova
- Associated Press Player of the Year: Jalen Brunson, Villanova
- NABC Player of the Year: Jalen Brunson, Villanova
- Oscar Robertson Trophy (USBWA): Jalen Brunson, Villanova
- Sporting News Player of the Year: Jalen Brunson, Villanova

=== Major freshman of the year awards ===
- Wayman Tisdale Award (USBWA): Trae Young, Oklahoma
- NABC Freshman of the Year: Marvin Bagley III, Duke
- Sporting News Freshman of the Year: Trae Young, Oklahoma

=== Major coach of the year awards ===
- Associated Press Coach of the Year: Tony Bennett, Virginia
- Henry Iba Award (USBWA): Tony Bennett, Virginia
- NABC Coach of the Year: Tony Bennett, Virginia
- Naismith College Coach of the Year: Tony Bennett, Virginia
- Sporting News Coach of the Year: Mick Cronin, Cincinnati

=== Other major awards ===
- Bob Cousy Award (Best point guard): Jalen Brunson, Villanova
- Jerry West Award (Best shooting guard): Carsen Edwards, Purdue
- Julius Erving Award (Best small forward): Mikal Bridges, Villanova
- Karl Malone Award (Best power forward): Deandre Ayton, Arizona
- Kareem Abdul-Jabbar Award (Best center): Ángel Delgado, Seton Hall
- Pete Newell Big Man Award (Best big man): Marvin Bagley III, Duke
- NABC Defensive Player of the Year: Jevon Carter, West Virginia
- Naismith Defensive Player of the Year (inaugural award): Jevon Carter, West Virginia
- Senior CLASS Award (top senior): Jevon Carter, West Virginia
- Robert V. Geasey Trophy (Top player in Philadelphia Big 5): Jalen Brunson, Villanova
- Haggerty Award (Top player in New York City metro area): Shamorie Ponds, St. John's
- Ben Jobe Award (Top minority coach): Donte Jackson, Grambling State
- Hugh Durham Award (Top mid-major coach): Ryan Odom, UMBC
- Jim Phelan Award (Top head coach): Chris Holtmann, Ohio State
- Lefty Driesell Award (Top defensive player): Jevon Carter, West Virginia
- Lou Henson Award (Top mid-major player): Clayton Custer, Loyola (Illinois)
- Lute Olson Award (Top non-freshman or transfer player): Jalen Brunson, Villanova
- Skip Prosser Man of the Year Award (Coach with moral character):
- Academic All-American of the Year (Top scholar-athlete): Jevon Carter, West Virginia
- Elite 90 Award (Top GPA among upperclass players at Final Four): Matt Kennedy, Villanova
- USBWA Most Courageous Award: Sam Dowd, Idaho State

== Coaching changes ==
Several teams changed coaches during and after the season.

Team	Former coach	Interim coach	New coach	Reason
Alabama A&M	Donnie Marsh	Dylan Howard		Marsh resigned on May 11 after one season at Alabama A&M. On May 17, AAMU associate head coach Howard was named interim head coach of the Bulldogs for the 2018–19 season, and had the interim tag removed following the season.
Bryant	Tim O'Shea		Jared Grasso	The 56-year-old O'Shea announced on February 12 that he would retire at the end of the season. The Bulldogs went 96–210 during O'Shea's 10-year tenure, including a 3–28 overall record and 2–16 in conference play this season. On March 30, Iona associate head coach Grasso was hired by Bryant for the head coaching position.
Cal State Northridge	Reggie Theus		Mark Gottfried	Cal State Northridge parted ways with Theus on March 6 after five seasons, finishing with a 53–105 record with no postseason appearances. Former North Carolina State head coach Gottfried was named head coach of the Matadors on March 13.
Charlotte	Mark Price	Houston Fancher	Ron Sanchez	Price was fired on December 14 after a 3–6 start and a 30–42 record overall in 2½ seasons at Charlotte. He was replaced on an interim basis by assistant Fancher for the rest of the season. Virginia associate head coach Sanchez was hired as head coach of the 49ers on March 19.
Chicago State	Tracy Dildy		Lance Irvin	Chicago State fired Dildy on the week of March 5, although it was not officially confirmed until March 12. The Cougars struggled during Dildy's eight-year tenure, which saw them lose at least 20 games in seven of those seasons. After a nearly five-month search, including hiring Chris Zorich as the new athletic director, the school hired Lance Irvin, a Chicago native and former assistant coach at DePaul and several other schools, as the new head coach on August 7.
Colorado State	Larry Eustachy	Steve Barnes; Jase Herl	Niko Medved	Eustachy, who was in his sixth season at Colorado State, was placed on administrative leave on February 3 amid an internal investigation into his conduct with players and staff members. He had previously been sanctioned by the university in 2017 for emotionally abusing players and assistant coaches from a university led investigation in 2014. Top assistant Steve Barnes was initially named as the interim replacement. A later report by The Denver Post indicated that school officials planned to fire Eustachy with cause, and were negotiating a contract buyout. On February 10, hours before the Rams' home game against San Jose State, the school placed Barnes on administrative leave after two games, and Barnes' top assistant Jase Herl was named interim coach for the rest of the season. On February 26, Eustachy resigned after reaching a buyout agreement. On March 22, Drake head coach and former Colorado State assistant Medved was named the new head coach.
Delaware State	Keith Walker	Keith Johnson	Eric Skeeters	Walker was fired on February 22 after five seasons at Delaware State, finishing with a 43–96 record, including a 3–25 record this season at the time of his firing. Associate head coach Johnson was named interim head coach of the Hornets for the rest of the season. More than five months after Walker's firing, along with hiring a new athletic director, the school hired UMBC assistant coach Skeeters for the job on July 25.
Detroit	Bacari Alexander		Mike Davis	Detroit fired Alexander on March 26 after two seasons at his alma mater, finishing 16–47 overall including a last place finish in Horizon league play this season. The school hired Texas Southern's Mike Davis as the new head coach on June 13.
Drake	Niko Medved		Darian DeVries	Medved left Drake after one season for the Colorado State head coaching job on March 22. Creighton assistant coach DeVries was named head coach of the Bulldogs on March 29.
East Carolina	Jeff Lebo	Michael Perry	Joe Dooley	Lebo announced his resignation from ECU on November 29, 2017, after a 2–4 start to the season and a 116–122 overall record with no NCAA tournament appearances in eight seasons with the program. Assistant Michael Perry was named interim head coach of the Pirates for the rest of the season. After the season was over, ECU brought back one of its former head coaches in Dooley, who had led the Pirates from 1995 to 1999, from Florida Gulf Coast on April 4.
Eastern Kentucky	Dan McHale		A. W. Hamilton	McHale was fired on February 26, the day after the Colonels ended the season 11–20 overall and 5–13 in Ohio Valley Conference play. In three seasons at EKU, he was 38–55 overall and 16–34 in OVC play, and failed to qualify for the OVC Tournament during his tenure at Eastern Kentucky. On March 23, EKU hired North Carolina State assistant Hamilton as the new head coach.
Evansville	Marty Simmons		Walter McCarty	Evansville fired Simmons on March 13 after 11 seasons. Although the former Indiana and Evansville player had three 20-win seasons with the Purple Aces, the team never made the NCAA tournament during his tenure. Evansville hired Boston Celtics assistant and Evansville native McCarty on March 22.
FIU	Anthony Evans		Jeremy Ballard	FIU parted ways with Evans on April 2 after five seasons and a 65–94 overall record. On April 20, VCU associate head coach Ballard was hired by the Panthers for the job.
Florida Atlantic	Michael Curry		Dusty May	After posting a 39–84 overall record in four seasons, FAU fired Curry on March 16. Florida assistant May was hired as head coach of the Owls on March 22.
Florida Gulf Coast	Joe Dooley		Michael Fly	Dooley left Florida Gulf Coast on April 4 after five seasons to return to East Carolina, having previously served as head coach of the school from 1995 to 1999. Longtime FGCU assistant coach Fly was promoted to head coach of the Eagles the following day.
Fresno State	Rodney Terry		Justin Hutson	Terry left Fresno State on March 12 after seven seasons for the UTEP head coaching job. The Bulldogs tabbed San Diego State assistant coach Hutson as his replacement on April 5.
Georgia	Mark Fox		Tom Crean	Georgia fired Fox on March 10 after nine seasons, in which the team went 163–133 overall, but had made the NCAA tournament just twice in his tenure. The Bulldogs hired ESPN analyst and former Indiana and Marquette head coach Crean on March 15.
High Point	Scott Cherry		Tubby Smith	Cherry and the university mutually agreed to part ways on March 7 after nine seasons, finishing with 146 wins and the program's winningest coach in the Division I era. On March 27, longtime college basketball coach and former High Point player Tubby Smith was named head coach of the Panthers.
Incarnate Word	Ken Burmeister		Carson Cunningham	Incarnate Word's Athletic Director announced on March 6 that Burmeister would not return next season, finishing with a 202–138 overall record in 12 seasons at the school. The Cardinals went to the NAIA for their next hire, naming Carroll College's Cunningham as the new head coach on March 22.
La Salle	John Giannini		Ashley Howard	La Salle parted ways with Giannini on March 23 after 14 seasons, finishing with 212 wins overall but only making the NCAA tournament once during his tenure as head coach. On April 10, Villanova assistant coach Howard, who previously served as assistant coach with the Explorers from 2004 to 2008, was hired for the head coaching job.
Little Rock	Wes Flanigan		Darrell Walker	Little Rock fired Flanagan on March 9 after two seasons, finishing 22–42 overall, including a school record 25 losses this season. On March 28, the Trojans hired former NBA player Darrell Walker, who spent the last two seasons as head coach at Division II Clark Atlanta University.
Longwood	Jayson Gee		Griff Aldrich	Gee was fired on March 2 after five seasons at Longwood, finishing 42–120 overall and never finishing higher than eighth place in Big South Conference play. On March 22, UMBC recruiting director Aldrich was named head coach of the Lancers.
Louisville	Rick Pitino	David Padgett	Chris Mack	Pitino, who was initially placed on unpaid administrative leave in September, was fired on October 16 after 16 seasons at Louisville amid revelations of his possible involvement in the NCAA corruption scandal. Louisville elevated assistant Padgett, but initially signed him only for the 2017–18 season. The Cardinals announced on March 21 that Padgett was not being retained. On March 27, Louisville hired Xavier head coach Chris Mack for the job.
Loyola (Maryland)	G.G. Smith		Tavaras Hardy	Smith resigned from Loyola on March 8 after five seasons, finishing with a record of 56–98 overall. On March 28, Georgia Tech assistant coach Hardy was hired by the Greyhounds for the head coaching position.
Maine	Bob Walsh		Richard Barron	Walsh resigned on March 5 after four seasons at Maine, choosing not to seek a contract extension. The Black Bears lost 100 overall games during Walsh's tenure with the team. Within hours, the school hired Barron, who had been working with the Maine athletic department after recovering from medical issues that forced him to take leave from coaching the Black Bears women's team in January 2017.
Marist	Mike Maker		John Dunne	Maker was fired on March 5 after four seasons at Marist, which saw the Red Foxes go 28–97 during his tenure. On April 3, Marist hired MAAC rival Saint Peter's head coach Dunne for the same position.
Maryland Eastern Shore	Bobby Collins	Clifford Reed	Jason Crafton	Collins' contract was not renewed on March 26, 2018, ending his 4-year tenure at Maryland Eastern Shore with a 49-82 overall record. Assistant coach Reed served as the interim head coach of the Hawks for the 2018–19 season, and after the season, the school hired Jason Crafton, assistant coach of the Philadelphia 76ers' NBA G League team Delaware Blue Coats and former head coach at Nyack College, on April 24, 2019.
McNeese State	Dave Simmons		Heath Schroyer	McNeese State parted ways with Simmons on March 4 after 12 seasons, finishing 155–211 overall with only two winning seasons and one postseason appearance. BYU assistant coach Schroyer, who had previous head coaching experience with Portland State, Wyoming, and Tennessee-Martin, was named head coach of the Cowboys on March 15.
Memphis	Tubby Smith		Penny Hardaway	Smith was fired on March 14 after two seasons amid a week of speculation that Memphis was seeking to hire Penny Hardaway, a former Tigers and NBA star. Although Smith went 40–26 overall and 21–13 this season, he struggled with recruiting and failed to make the NCAA tournament in either season. Hardaway was officially introduced as the new coach on March 20.
Middle Tennessee	Kermit Davis		Nick McDevitt	Davis left Middle Tennessee after 16 seasons for the Ole Miss head coaching job on March 19, after officially being named head coach on March 15. UNC Asheville head coach McDevitt was hired as head coach by the Blue Raiders on March 24.
Missouri State	Paul Lusk		Dana Ford	Lusk was fired on March 3 after seven seasons at Missouri State, finishing 106–121 overall, including an 18–15 overall record and 7–11 in conference play after the Bears were picked as the preseason favorite to win the MVC regular-season title. On March 21, the school hired Tennessee State head coach Ford for the job.
Mount St. Mary's	Jamion Christian		Dan Engelstad	Christian left his alma mater on May 2 after six seasons for the Siena job. On May 9, the school hired former Mountaineer assistant coach Englestad from Division III Southern Vermont as Christian's replacement.
Nicholls State	Richie Riley		Austin Claunch	Riley left Nicholls on March 15 after two seasons for the South Alabama head coaching job. Assistant coach Claunch was promoted to head coach of the Colonels on March 29.
Ole Miss	Andy Kennedy	Tony Madlock	Kermit Davis	It was initially announced on February 12 that Kennedy, the program's winningest head coach, would part ways with Ole Miss at the end of the season after 12 years at the school. However, on February 19, Kennedy announced that he would depart immediately, with assistant Madlock taking over on an interim basis for the rest of the season. The Rebels hired Middle Tennessee head coach Davis on March 15, and officially introduced him on March 19 after the Blue Raiders second round loss to Louisville in the NIT.
Pepperdine	Marty Wilson		Lorenzo Romar	Pepperdine announced on February 13 that Wilson would not return as head coach of his alma mater, effective at the end of the season. He finished at Pepperdine with a seven-year record of 88–129 (91–139 when including his 3–10 record as interim head coach in 1995–96). Arizona associate head coach Romar, who previously served as head coach of the Waves from 1996 to 1999, was named head coach on March 12, and was formally introduced after Arizona was upset by Buffalo in the NCAA tournament.
Pittsburgh	Kevin Stallings		Jeff Capel	After two disastrous seasons, including going winless in ACC play this season, Pitt fired Stallings on March 8. On March 27, Duke associate head coach and former VCU/Oklahoma head coach Capel was hired by the Panthers for the job.
Rhode Island	Dan Hurley		David Cox	Hurley left Rhode Island after six seasons to take the UConn head coaching job on March 22. On April 4, top assistant Cox was promoted to head coach of the Rams.
Saint Peter's	John Dunne		Shaheen Holloway	Dunne left Saint Peter's after 12 seasons for the head coaching job at MAAC rival Marist on April 3. The Peacocks stayed local for their new hire, announcing Seton Hall assistant Holloway as the new head coach on April 11.
San Diego	Lamont Smith	Sam Scholl		Smith resigned from his alma mater on March 8 after three seasons. He had been placed on administrative leave by the university following a February 25 domestic violence arrest and had the charges dropped hours before announcing his resignation. Assistant coach Scholl, who coached the Toreros in the WCC tournament, was named interim head coach of the team during the CIT tournament, and had the interim tag removed at the end of the season.
Siena	Jimmy Patsos		Jamion Christian	Patsos resigned on April 13 after five seasons at Siena and a 77–92 overall record, including an 8–24 finish this season. Despite this, he had the apparent confidence of the school's athletic director, but an ongoing internal investigation into the program revealed multiple issues, with allegations ranging from abusive conduct to financial improprieties. Mount St. Mary's head coach Christian was hired by the Saints for the job on May 2.
South Alabama	Matthew Graves		Richie Riley	South Alabama fired Graves on March 8 after five seasons, finishing 65–96 overall with no postseason appearances. Nicholls State head coach Richie Riley was hired by the Jaguars for the head coaching job on March 15.
South Dakota	Craig Smith		Todd Lee	Smith left South Dakota on March 26 after four seasons for the Utah State head coaching job. South Dakota alum Todd Lee, who spent the past five seasons as associate head coach at Grand Canyon University under Dan Majerle, was hired by the Coyotes as Smith's replacement on April 4.
Tennessee State	Dana Ford		Brian Collins	Ford left Tennessee State on March 21 after four seasons for the Missouri State head coaching job. On March 26, the Tigers brought Illinois State assistant coach Collins back to his hometown of Nashville, where he also played in college at Belmont, as the new head coach.
Texas-Arlington	Scott Cross		Chris Ogden	Considered to be one of the most controversial coaching changes of the off-season, Cross, UTA's all-time winningest head coach with 225 wins, was fired on March 26 after 12 seasons at his alma mater, with UTA's athletic director citing new leadership in the program as the reason for firing Cross. Former Texas player Ogden, who spent the past two seasons as an assistant at Texas Tech, was hired by the Mavericks as Cross's replacement on April 6.
Texas Southern	Mike Davis		Johnny Jones	Davis left Texas Southern on June 13 after six seasons for the Detroit Mercy head coaching job. On June 25, the Tigers hired Nevada associate head coach and former LSU/North Texas head coach Johnny Jones for the job.
UConn	Kevin Ollie		Dan Hurley	UConn dismissed Ollie on March 10 after six seasons, stating that it had "initiated disciplinary procedures" to formally fire him with cause. The school announced in January it was the subject of an NCAA investigation, with media reporting that the inquiry involved recruiting. Ollie, a former Huskies star and NBA journeyman, replaced Hall of Fame coach Jim Calhoun in 2012, and coached UConn to a national title in 2014, but the team failed to make the postseason for the second year in a row and finished 14–18 this season. On March 22, UConn hired Rhode Island head coach Dan Hurley as the new head coach.
UC Riverside	Dennis Cutts	Justin Bell	David Patrick	Cutts was fired on January 1 after a 50–85 record in five seasons at UCR, including a 5–9 start to the season. Associate head coach Bell was named interim head coach of the Highlanders for the remainder of the season. TCU assistant coach Patrick was named the new head coach of UCR on March 14 and formally introduced after the Horned Frogs were eliminated from the NCAA tournament.
UNC Asheville	Nick McDevitt		Mike Morrell	McDevitt left his alma mater on March 24 after five seasons for the Middle Tennessee head coaching job. UNCA announced Texas assistant Morrell as the new head coach of the Bulldogs on April 11.
USC Upstate	Kyle Perry		Dave Dickerson	Less than five months after being named full-time head coach, USC Upstate fired Perry on March 1, three days after the Spartans lost to Florida Gulf Coast in the first round of the ASUN tournament. On March 30, USC Upstate hired former Tulane head coach Dickerson, who had been serving as a scout for the Utah Jazz.
Utah State	Tim Duryea		Craig Smith	Utah State fired Duryea on March 11 after three seasons and a 47–49 record. On March 26, the Aggies hired South Dakota head coach Craig Smith for the same position.
UTEP	Tim Floyd	Phil Johnson	Rodney Terry	The 63-year-old Floyd announced his retirement, effective immediately, after eight seasons at UTEP and 24 overall following the Miners loss to Lamar on November 27. Floyd's longtime assistant Johnson was named interim head coach of the team the following day. On March 12, the school hired Fresno State head coach Terry as the new head coach.
Western Carolina	Larry Hunter		Mark Prosser	It was announced on March 4 that Hunter was stepping down from Western Carolina after 13 seasons. On March 27, Winthrop associate head coach Mark Prosser, son of the late former Xavier and Wake Forest head coach Skip Prosser, was hired as the new head coach of the Catamounts. In a postscript to the story, Hunter died two months after his resignation on May 4 from a stroke he suffered earlier in the week.
Xavier	Chris Mack		Travis Steele	Mack left his alma mater on March 27 after nine seasons for the Louisville head coaching job. On March 31, longtime Xavier assistant coach Steele was promoted to head coach of the Musketeers.

== Attendances ==
The top 30 NCAA Division I men's basketball teams by average home attendance:

#	Team	Home games	Total attendance	Average attendance
1	Kentucky	18	393,743	21,874
2	Syracuse	19	407,778	21,462
3	North Carolina	15	275,681	18,378
4	Wisconsin	18	310,901	17,272
5	Creighton	18	306,000	17,000
6	Louisville	22	371,427	16,883
7	Kansas	18	294,206	16,344
8	Tennessee	15	243,148	16,209
9	Arkansas	17	275,084	16,181
10	Indiana	18	280,631	15,590
11	Nebraska	17	263,367	15,492
12	NC State	19	289,807	15,253
13	Missouri	16	240,976	15,061
14	Michigan State	17	251,549	14,797
15	Maryland	18	264,164	14,675
16	Arizona	16	230,947	14,434
17	Purdue	17	243,844	14,343
18	BYU	16	227,692	14,230
19	Iowa State	16	225,941	14,121
20	Virginia	17	236,703	13,923
21	Ohio State	18	242,916	13,495
22	Alabama	17	227,640	13,390
23	Dayton	16	207,950	12,996
24	South Carolina	15	189,265	12,617
25	Illinois	18	227,051	12,613
26	Marquette	20	246,469	12,323
27	West Virginia	17	209,164	12,303
28	Iowa	15	180,391	12,026
29	Minnesota	17	201,454	11,850
30	Villanova	13	153,775	11,828

== See also ==
- 2017–18 NCAA Division I women's basketball season
