= 2017–18 Wichita State Shockers men's basketball team =

American college basketball season

2017–18 Wichita State Shockers men's basketball

NCAA tournament, First Round
- Conference: American Athletic Conference

Ranking
- Coaches: No. 25
- AP: No. 16
- Record: 25–8 (14–4 AAC)
- Head coach: Gregg Marshall (11th season)
- Assistant coaches: Donnie Jones; Isaac Brown; Kyle Lindsted
- Home arena: Charles Koch Arena

2017–18 American Athletic Conference men's basketball standings
	Conf.				Overall
Team	W		L	PCT	W		L	PCT
No. 6 Cincinnati †	16	–	2	.889	31	–	5	.861
No. 16 Wichita State	14	–	4	.778	25	–	8	.758
No. 21 Houston	14	–	4	.778	27	–	8	.771
Tulsa	12	–	6	.667	19	–	12	.613
Memphis	10	–	8	.556	21	–	13	.618
UCF	9	–	9	.500	19	–	13	.594
Temple	8	–	10	.444	17	–	16	.515
UConn	7	–	11	.389	14	–	18	.438
SMU	6	–	12	.333	17	–	16	.515
Tulane	5	–	13	.278	14	–	17	.452
East Carolina	4	–	14	.222	10	–	20	.333
South Florida	3	–	15	.167	10	–	22	.313
† 2018 AAC tournament winner Rankings from AP poll

The 2017–18 Wichita State Shockers men's basketball team represented Wichita State University in the 2017–18 NCAA Division I men's basketball season. They played their home games at Charles Koch Arena in Wichita, Kansas and are led by 11th-year head coach Gregg Marshall. The season marked the Shockers' first season as members of the American Athletic Conference. They finished the season 25–8, 14–4 in AAC play to finish a tie for second place. As the No. 2 seed in the AAC tournament, they defeated Temple in the quarterfinals before losing to Houston in the semifinals. They received an at-large bid to the NCAA tournament for the seventh season. As the No. 4 seed in the East region, they were upset in the first round by Marshall.

== Previous season ==
The Shockers finished the 2016–17 season 31–5, 17–1 to finish in a tie for first place in MVC play. In the MVC tournament, they beat Bradley, Missouri State, and Illinois State to win the tournament championship. As a result, they earned the conference's automatic bid to the NCAA tournament. As the No. 10 seed in the South region (considered by everyone to be too high), they defeated No. 7 Dayton in the first round before losing to No. 2 Kentucky in the second round.

The season marked the Shockers' final season as a member of the Missouri Valley Conference as the school announced on April 7, 2017 that it would be joining the American Athletic Conference effective July 1, 2017.

== Offseason ==
=== Returning players ===
It was expected that the Shockers would return all five starters and nearly all of their scholarship players from the prior season. The only two seniors on the prior season's roster, Zach Bush and John Robert Simon, were walk-ons. Two underclass players, rising junior Eric Hamilton and rising senior Daishon Smith, announced plans to transfer from Wichita State. Hamilton had been a little-used reserve; Smith had started at point guard at the beginning of the 2016–17 season, but lost his starting position to Landry Shamet and was seeing relatively little playing time by the end of the season.

Two other players, Markis McDuffie and Shaquille Morris, declared for the 2017 NBA draft, but neither hired an agent, allowing them to return to Wichita State if they withdrew from the draft within 10 days of the end of the mid-May NBA Draft Combine (specifically May 24). Both withdrew from the draft the day before the deadline.

=== Departures ===
Name	Number	Pos.	Height	Weight	Year	Hometown	Reason left
Daishon Smith	2	G	6'1"	175	Junior	Jacksonville, FL	Transferred to Louisiana–Monroe
Zach Bush	5	G	6'6"	175	Senior (redshirt)	Wichita, KS	Graduated
John Robert Simon	14	G	5'10"	175	Senior	Oklahoma City, OK	Graduated
Eric Hamilton	25	F	6'8"	230	Sophomore	Atlanta, GA	Transferred to UNC Greensboro

=== 2017 recruiting class ===
College recruiting
Name	Hometown	School	Height	Weight	Commit date
Rodgerick Brown; G/F	Cordova, Tennessee	Cordova HS	6 ft 6 in (1.98 m)	193 lb (88 kg)	Jun 19, 2017
Rodgerick Brown; G/F	Recruit ratings: Scout: Rivals: 247Sports: (79)				
Asbjørn Midtgaard; C	Helsingør, Denmark	Espergærde Gymnasium og HF	7 ft 1 in (2.16 m)	265 lb (120 kg)	Nov 16, 2016
Asbjørn Midtgaard; C	Recruit ratings: Scout: Rivals: 247Sports: (NR)				
Overall recruit ranking:
Note: In many cases, Scout, Rivals, 247Sports, On3, and ESPN may conflict in their listings of height and weight.; In these cases, the average was taken. ESPN grades are on a 100-point scale.; Sources: "2017 Wichita State Basketball Commits". Rivals.; "2017 Wichita State Basketball Commits". Scout.; "2017 Wichita State Basketball Commits". ESPN.; "Scout.com Team Recruiting Rankings". Scout.; "2017 Team Ranking". Rivals.

=== Injuries ===
On July 21, 2017, point guard Landry Shamet, a potential All-American, suffered a stress fracture in his right foot and would need surgery. He was expected to miss 12–16 weeks to recover from the injury. Shamet was expected to be ready for the team's season opener on November 10, and that proved true, as he scored 17 points in only 17 minutes of action in the Shockers' 109–57 blowout of UMKC and, according to the Associated Press, "looked completely recovered".

Shortly before practices began on September 29, it was announced that Markis McDuffie would be sidelined with a stress fracture in his left foot. It was expected that he would miss a majority of the non-conference schedule, but would return some time in late December. McDuffie returned for the final non-conference game on December 22 game against Florida Gulf Coast.

== Preseason ==
At the conference's annual media day, the Shockers were narrowly picked to finish second in the AAC, receiving five of the 12 first place votes. Landry Shamet was named to the preseason All-AAC first team.

== Roster ==
2017–18 Wichita State Shockers men's basketball team
Players
Coaches

Pos.	#	Name	Height	Weight	Year	Previous school	Hometown
F	0	Rashard Kelly	6 ft 7 in (2.01 m)	227 lb (103 kg)	Sr	Hargrave Military Academy	Fredericksburg, Virginia
F	1	Zach Brown	6 ft 6 in (1.98 m)	213 lb (97 kg)	Sr	Sunrise Christian Academy	Houston, Texas
G	3	C. J. Keyser	6 ft 3 in (1.91 m)	194 lb (88 kg)	So	Brewster Academy	Baltimore, Maryland
G	4	Samajae Haynes-Jones	6 ft 0 in (1.83 m)	177 lb (80 kg)	Jr	Hutchinson CC	Wichita, Kansas
F	5	Rod Brown	6 ft 6 in (1.98 m)	190 lb (86 kg)	Fr	Cordova HS	Cordova, Tennessee
G	10	Kaelen Malone	6 ft 0 in (1.83 m)	168 lb (76 kg)	Jr	McLennan CC	McKinney, Texas
G	11	Landry Shamet	6 ft 4 in (1.93 m)	180 lb (82 kg)	RS So	Park Hill HS	Kansas City, Missouri
G	12	Austin Reaves	6 ft 5 in (1.96 m)	174 lb (79 kg)	So	Cedar Ridge HS	Newark, Arkansas
G	14	Jacob Herrs (W)	6 ft 3 in (1.91 m)	164 lb (74 kg)	Fr	Andover HS	Wichita, Kansas
C	20	Rauno Nurger	6 ft 10 in (2.08 m)	232 lb (105 kg)	Sr	Sunrise Christian Academy	Keila, Estonia
F	21	Darral Willis	6 ft 9 in (2.06 m)	225 lb (102 kg)	Sr	Pearl River CC	Madison, Wisconsin
C	22	Asbjørn Midtgaard	7 ft 0 in (2.13 m)	270 lb (122 kg)	Fr	Espergarte Gymnasium	Helsingør, Denmark
G	23	Brycen Bush (W)	6 ft 0 in (1.83 m)	152 lb (69 kg)	Fr	Goddard Eisenhower HS	Wichita, Kansas
C	24	Shaquille Morris	6 ft 8 in (2.03 m)	265 lb (120 kg)	RS Sr	Edmond Memorial HS	Edmond, Oklahoma
F	25	Brett Barney (W)	6 ft 9 in (2.06 m)	210 lb (95 kg)	RS So	Sunrise Christian Academy	Wichita, Kansas
F	32	Markis McDuffie (injured)	6 ft 8 in (2.03 m)	203 lb (92 kg)	Jr	St. Anthony HS	Paterson, New Jersey
G	33	Conner Frankamp	6 ft 1 in (1.85 m)	171 lb (78 kg)	RS Sr	Kansas	Wichita, Kansas

Head coach

- Gregg Marshall (Randolph–Macon)

Assistant coach(es)

- Donnie Jones (Pikeville)
- Isaac Brown (Louisiana–Monroe)
- Kyle Lindsted (Central Christian (KS))

Legend

- (C) Team captain
- (S) Suspended
- (I) Ineligible
- (W) Walk-on
- Injured
- Current redshirt

Roster
Last update: September 14, 2017

== Schedule and results ==
Date time, TV	Rank^{#}	Opponent^{#}	Result	Record	High points	High rebounds	High assists	Site (attendance) city, state
Exhibition
November 4, 2017*; 7:00 pm, Cox	No. 7	Henderson State	W 90–53		16 – Morris	7 – Willis	4 – Haynes-Jones	Charles Koch Arena (10,333); Wichita, KS
November 6, 2017*; 7:00 pm, Cox	No. 7	Newman; ARC Charity Exhibition	W 113–55	–	16 – Nurger	11 – Tied	6 – Kelly	Charles Koch Arena (5,345); Wichita, KS
Non-conference regular season
November 10, 2017*; 7:00 pm, Cox	No. 7	UMKC	W 109–57	1–0	19 – Willis	10 – Willis	9 – Frankamp	Charles Koch Arena (10,506); Wichita, KS
November 13, 2017*; 8:00 pm, CBSSN	No. 6	College of Charleston	W 81–63	2–0	18 – Morris	10 – Morris	7 – Haynes-Jones	Charles Koch Arena (10,506); Wichita, KS
November 20, 2017; 4:00 pm, ESPN2	No. 6	vs. California; Maui Invitational quarterfinals	W 92–82	3–0	25 – Morris	10 – Kelly	4 – Reaves	Lahaina Civic Center (2,400); Lahaina, HI
November 21, 2017; 12:30 pm, ESPN	No. 6	vs. Marquette; Maui Invitational semifinals	W 80–66	4–0	19 – Shamet	10 – Kelly	8 – Kelly	Lahaina Civic Center (2,400); Lahaina, HI
November 22, 2017; 9:00 pm, ESPN2	No. 6	vs. No. 13 Notre Dame; Maui Invitational finals	L 66–67	4–1	14 – Brown	8 – Kelly	7 – Shamet	Lahaina Civic Center (2,400); Lahaina, HI
November 28, 2017*; 7:00 pm, Cox	No. 8	Savannah State	W 112–66	5–1	31 – Haynes-Jones	12 – Willis Jr.	5 – Haynes-Jones	Charles Koch Arena (10,506); Wichita, KS
December 2, 2017*; 1:00 pm, ESPNU	No. 8	at No. 16 Baylor	W 69–62	6–1	17 – Frankamp	7 – Kelly	7 – Shamet	Ferrell Center (9,733); Waco, TX
December 5, 2017*; 7:00 pm, Cox	No. 6	South Dakota State	W 95–85	7–1	21 – Shamet	8 – Brown	8 – Shamet	Charles Koch Arena (10,506); Wichita, KS
December 9, 2017*; 3:00 pm, ESPN2	No. 6	at Oklahoma State	W 78–66	8–1	30 – Shamet	7 – Kelly	5 – Shamet	Gallagher-Iba Arena (9,655); Stillwater, OK
December 16, 2017*; 3:00 pm, ESPN2	No. 3	vs. Oklahoma; Intrust Bank Arena Showcase	L 83–91	8–2	20 – Willis Jr.	12 – Willis Jr.	5 – Shamet	Intrust Bank Arena (15,004); Wichita, KS
December 19, 2017*; 7:00 pm, Cox	No. 11	Arkansas State	W 89–80	9–2	27 – Haynes-Jones	8 – Kelly	6 – Shamet	Charles Koch Arena (10,506); Wichita, KS
December 22, 2017*; 6:00 pm, CBSSN	No. 11	Florida Gulf Coast	W 75–65	10–2	23 – Shamet	13 – Willis Jr.	5 – Shamet	Charles Koch Arena (10,506); Wichita, KS
AAC regular season
December 30, 2017; 11:00 am, CBS	No. 8	at UConn	W 72–62	11–2 (1–0)	16 – Shamet	12 – Kelly	6 – Shamet	XL Center (15,564); Hartford, CT
January 4, 2018; 6:00 pm, ESPN	No. 9	Houston	W 81–63	12–2 (2–0)	18 – Shamet	7 – Brown	5 – Brown	Charles Koch Arena (10,506); Wichita, KS
January 7, 2018; 3:00 pm, CBSSN	No. 9	South Florida	W 95–57	13–2 (3–0)	15 – Morris	6 – McDuffie	7 – Tied	Charles Koch Arena (10,506); Wichita, KS
January 11, 2018; 8:00 pm, ESPN2	No. 5-t	at East Carolina	W 95–60	14–2 (4–0)	14 – Nurger	8 – Kelly	11 – Shamet	Williams Arena (5,539); Greenville, NC
January 13, 2018; 6:30 pm, ESPNU	No. 5-t	at Tulsa	W 72–69	15–2 (5–0)	16 – Tied	9 – McDuffie	3 – Shamet	Reynolds Center (8,355); Tulsa, OK
January 17, 2018; 6:00 pm, ESPNU	No. 7	SMU	L 78–83	15–3 (5–1)	20 – Shamet	6 – Kelly	10 – Shamet	Charles Koch Arena (10,506); Wichita, KS
January 20, 2018; 11:00 am, ESPNU	No. 7	at Houston	L 59–73	15–4 (5–2)	12 – Morris	10 – Kelly	3 – Tied	H&PE Arena (5,708); Houston, TX
January 25, 2018; 8:00 pm, ESPN2	No. 17	UCF	W 81–62	16–4 (6–2)	19 – Morris	10 – Kelly	6 – Shamet	Charles Koch Arena (10,506); Wichita, KS
January 28, 2018; 5:00 pm, CBSSN	No. 17	Tulsa	W 90–71	17–4 (7–2)	23 – Reaves	11 – Kelly	8 – Kelly	Charles Koch Arena (10,506); Wichita, KS
February 1, 2018; 6:00 pm, ESPN2	No. 16	at Temple	L 79–81 ^{OT}	17–5 (7–3)	24 – Morris	9 – Morris	7 – Shamet	Liacouras Center (6,320); Philadelphia, PA
February 6, 2018; 8:00 pm, CBSSN	No. 22	at Memphis	W 85–65	18–5 (8–3)	22 – Reaves	12 – Willis, Jr	5 – Shamet	FedEx Forum (7,257); Memphis, TN
February 10, 2018; 5:00 pm, ESPN2	No. 22	UConn	W 95–74	19–5 (9–3)	16 – Shamet	10 – Kelly	5 – Kelly	Charles Koch Arena (10,506); Wichita, KS
February 15, 2018; 6:00 pm, ESPN2	No. 19	Temple	W 93–86	20–5 (10–3)	24 – Willis, Jr	13 – Morris	5 – Shamet	Charles Koch Arena (10,506); Wichita, KS
February 18, 2018; 3:00 pm, ESPN	No. 19	at No. 5 Cincinnati	W 76–72	21–5 (11–3)	19 – Shamet	5 – McDuffie	5 – Shamet	BB&T Arena (9,523); Highland Heights, KY
February 21, 2018; 6:30 pm, CBSSN	No. 13	Tulane	W 93–86	22–5 (12–3)	25 – Morris	9 – Morris	4 – Frankamp	Charles Koch Arena (10,506); Wichita, KS
February 24, 2018; 1:00 pm, ESPN	No. 13	at SMU	W 84–78	23–5 (13–3)	26 – McDuffie	10 – Morris	4 – Tied	Moody Coliseum (6,931); University Park, TX
March 1, 2018; 6:00 pm, ESPN	No. 11	at UCF	W 75–71 ^{OT}	24–5 (14–3)	19 – Morris	9 – Tied	6 – Shamet	CFE Arena (5,930); Orlando, FL
March 4, 2018; 11:00 am, CBS	No. 11	No. 10 Cincinnati	L 61–62	24–6 (14–4)	16 – Tied	8 – Morris	5 – Shamet	Charles Koch Arena (10,506); Wichita, KS
AAC tournament
March 9, 2018; 5:00 pm, ESPNU	(2) No. 11	vs. (7) Temple; Quarterfinals	W 89–81	25–6	24 – Shamet	8 – Morris	4 – Shamet	Amway Center (8,680); Orlando, FL
March 10, 2018; 2:30 pm, CBS	(2) No. 11	vs. (3) No. 21 Houston; Semifinals	L 74–77	25–7	19 – Shamet	12 – Kelly	4 – Shamet	Amway Center (8,644); Orlando, FL
NCAA tournament
March 16, 2018*; 12:30 pm, TNT	(4 E) No. 16	vs. (13 E) Marshall; First Round	L 75–81	25–8	27 – Frankamp	11 – Kelly	8 – Shamet	Viejas Arena (10,892); San Diego, CA
*Non-conference game. ^{#}Rankings from AP Poll. (#) Tournament seedings in parentheses. All times are in Central Time.

== Rankings ==
Ranking movements Legend: ██ Increase in ranking ██ Decrease in ranking
	Week																			
Poll	Pre	1	2	3	4	5	6	7	8	9	10	11	12	13	14	15	16	17	18	Final
AP	7	6	6	8	6	3	11	8	9	5	7	17	16	22	19	13	11	11	16	Not released
Coaches	8	8^	6	8	6	3	11	10	9	5	7	16	16	21	18	12	11	14	16	25

^Coaches Poll did not release a Week 2 poll at the same time AP did.
*AP does not release post-NCAA tournament rankings.
