= 2017–18 Notre Dame Fighting Irish men's basketball team =

American college basketball season

2017–18 Notre Dame Fighting Irish men's basketball

Maui Invitational champions

NIT, Second Round
- Conference: Atlantic Coast Conference
- Record: 21–15 (8–10 ACC)
- Head coach: Mike Brey (18th season)
- Assistant coaches: Rod Balanis; Ryan Ayers; Ryan Humphrey
- Home arena: Edmund P. Joyce Center

2017–18 ACC men's basketball standings
	Conf.				Overall
Team	W		L	PCT	W		L	PCT
No. 1 Virginia †	17	–	1	.944	31	–	3	.912
No. 9 Duke	13	–	5	.722	29	–	8	.784
No. 22 Miami (FL)	11	–	7	.611	22	–	10	.688
No. 20 Clemson	11	–	7	.611	25	–	10	.714
NC State	11	–	7	.611	21	–	12	.636
No. 10 North Carolina	11	–	7	.611	26	–	11	.703
Virginia Tech	10	–	8	.556	21	–	12	.636
Florida State	9	–	9	.500	23	–	12	.657
Louisville	9	–	9	.500	22	–	14	.611
Notre Dame	8	–	10	.444	21	–	15	.583
Syracuse	8	–	10	.444	23	–	14	.622
Boston College	7	–	11	.389	19	–	16	.543
Georgia Tech	6	–	12	.333	13	–	19	.406
Wake Forest	4	–	14	.222	11	–	20	.355
Pittsburgh	0	–	18	.000	8	–	24	.250
† 2018 ACC tournament winner Rankings from AP poll

The 2017–18 Notre Dame Fighting Irish men's basketball team represented the University of Notre Dame during the 2017–18 NCAA Division I men's basketball season. The Fighting Irish, led by 18th-year head coach Mike Brey, played their home games at Edmund P. Joyce Center in South Bend, Indiana as fifth-year members of the Atlantic Coast Conference. They finished the season 21–15, 8–10 in ACC play to finish tied with Syracuse for tenth place. As the No. 10 seed in the ACC tournament, they defeated Pittsburgh in the first round and Virginia Tech in the second round before losing to Duke in the quarterfinals. They were one of the last four teams not selected for the NCAA tournament and as a result earned a No. 1 seed in the National Invitation Tournament, where they defeated Hampton in the first round before losing to Penn State in the second round.

== Previous season ==
The Fighting Irish finished the 2016–17 season 26–10, 12–6 in ACC play to finish in a three-way tie for second place. They defeated Virginia and Florida State to advance to the championship game of the ACC tournament where they lost to Duke. They received an at-large bid to the NCAA tournament as the No. 5 seed in the West Region. There they defeated #12 seed Princeton in the First Round before losing in the Second Round where they lost to #4 seed West Virginia.

== Offseason ==
=== Departures ===
Name	Number	Pos.	Height	Weight	Year	Hometown	Reason for departure
V. J. Beachem	3	F	6'8"	201	Senior	Fort Wayne, IN	Graduated/Undrafted 2017 NBA draft
Matt Ryan	4	F	6'7"	228	Sophomore	Cortlandt Manor, NY	Transferred to Vanderbilt
Patrick Mazza	30	F	6'10"	255	RS Senior	Glen Ellyn, IL	Walk-on; graduated
Steve Vasturia	32	G	6'5"	212	Senior	Medford, NJ	Graduated

=== Incoming transfers ===
Name	Number	Pos.	Height	Weight	Year	Hometown	Previous School
Juwan Durham	11	F	6'11"	207	Sophomore	Tampa, FL	Transferred from Connecticut. Under NCAA transfer rules, Durham will have to sit out for the 2017–18 season. Will have three years of remaining eligibility.

=== 2017 recruiting class ===
College recruiting information
Name	Hometown	School	Height	Weight	Commit date
D.J. Harvey; SF	Bowie, MD	DeMatha Catholic High School	6 ft 6 in (1.98 m)	185 lb (84 kg)	Sep 20, 2016
D.J. Harvey; SF	Recruit ratings: Scout: Rivals: 247Sports: ESPN:				
Overall recruit ranking:
Note: In many cases, Scout, Rivals, 247Sports, On3, and ESPN may conflict in their listings of height and weight.; In these cases, the average was taken. ESPN grades are on a 100-point scale.; Sources: "Notre Dame 2017 Basketball Commitments". Rivals.; "2017 Team Ranking". Rivals.

=== 2018 recruiting class ===
College recruiting information (2018)
Name	Hometown	School	Height	Weight	Commit date
Nate Laszewski #14 PF	Northfield, MA	Northfield-Mt. Hermon School	6 ft 9 in (2.06 m)	210 lb (95 kg)	Sep 27, 2017
Nate Laszewski #14 PF	Recruit ratings: Scout: Rivals: 247Sports: ESPN:				
Dane Goodwin #14 SG	Upper Arlington, OH	Upper Arlington High School	6 ft 5 in (1.96 m)	190 lb (86 kg)	Jul 5, 2017
Dane Goodwin #14 SG	Recruit ratings: Scout: Rivals: 247Sports: ESPN:				
Robby Carmody #20 SF	Mars, PA	Mars Area High School	6 ft 4 in (1.93 m)	185 lb (84 kg)	Jun 22, 2017
Robby Carmody #20 SF	Recruit ratings: Scout: Rivals: 247Sports: ESPN:				
Prentiss Hubb #15 SG	Upper Marlboro, MD	Gonzaga College High School	6 ft 3 in (1.91 m)	170 lb (77 kg)	May 17, 2017
Prentiss Hubb #15 SG	Recruit ratings: Scout: Rivals: 247Sports: ESPN:				
Chris Doherty #38 C	Marlborough, MA	Marlborough High School	6 ft 7 in (2.01 m)	225 lb (102 kg)	Nov 13, 2017
Chris Doherty #38 C	Recruit ratings: Scout: Rivals: 247Sports: ESPN:				
Overall recruit ranking:
Note: In many cases, Scout, Rivals, 247Sports, On3, and ESPN may conflict in their listings of height and weight.; In these cases, the average was taken. ESPN grades are on a 100-point scale.; Sources: "Notre Dame 2018 Basketball Commitments". Rivals.; "2018 Team Ranking". Rivals.

== Roster ==
2017–18 Notre Dame Fighting Irish men's basketball team
Players
Coaches

Pos.	#	Name	Height	Weight	Year	Previous school	Hometown
G	0	Rex Pflueger	6 ft 6 in (1.98 m)	206 lb (93 kg)	Jr	Mater Dei	Dana Point, California
F	1	Austin Torres	6 ft 7 in (2.01 m)	235 lb (107 kg)	RS Sr	Penn	Granger, Indiana
G/F	3	D. J. Harvey	6 ft 6 in (1.98 m)	220 lb (100 kg)	Fr	DeMatha	Bowie, Maryland
G	5	Matt Farrell	6 ft 1 in (1.85 m)	175 lb (79 kg)	Sr	Point Pleasant Beach	Point Pleasant, New Jersey
G	10	T. J. Gibbs	6 ft 3 in (1.91 m)	188 lb (85 kg)	So	Seton Hall Prep	Scotch Plains, New Jersey
PF	11	Juwan Durham (redshirt)	6 ft 11 in (2.11 m)	215 lb (98 kg)	So	Tampa Preparatory School; Connecticut	Tampa, Florida
F	12	Elijah Burns	6 ft 8 in (2.03 m)	238 lb (108 kg)	RS So	Blair Academy	Troy, New York
G	13	Nikola Djogo	6 ft 7 in (2.01 m)	211 lb (96 kg)	RS Fr	Athlete Institute Prep	Hamilton, Ontario
F	21	Matt Gregory (W)	6 ft 6 in (1.98 m)	204 lb (93 kg)	Sr	Cathedral	Avon, Indiana
F	23	Martinas Geben	6 ft 10 in (2.08 m)	252 lb (114 kg)	Sr	St. Maria Goretti	Vilnius, Lithuania
G	25	Liam Nelligan (W)	6 ft 5 in (1.96 m)	195 lb (88 kg)	Sr	Benet Academy	La Grange Park, Illinois
F	33	John Mooney	6 ft 9 in (2.06 m)	248 lb (112 kg)	So	Lake Brantley	Orlando, Florida
F	35	Bonzie Colson	6 ft 5 in (1.96 m)	224 lb (102 kg)	Sr	St. Andrew's School	New Bedford, Massachusetts

Head coach

- Mike Brey (George Washington)

Assistant coach(es)

- Rod Balanis (Georgia Tech)
- Ryan Ayers (Notre Dame)
- Ryan Humphrey (Notre Dame)

Legend

- (C) Team captain
- (S) Suspended
- (I) Ineligible
- (W) Walk-on
- Injured
- Current redshirt

Roster

== Schedule and results ==
Date time, TV	Rank^{#}	Opponent^{#}	Result	Record	High points	High rebounds	High assists	Site (attendance) city, state
Exhibition
Oct 20, 2017*; 7:00 pm		Holy Cross (IN)	W 97–57		20 – Geben	13 – Colson	5 – Pflueger	Edmund P. Joyce Center (3,483); South Bend, IN
Nov 3, 2017*; 7:00 pm, ACCN Extra	No. 14	Bethel	W 88–59		19 – Colson	11 – Colson	7 – Farrell	Edmund P. Joyce Center (9,149); South Bend, IN
Nov 7, 2017*; 7:00 pm, ACCN Extra	No. 14	Cardinal Stritch	W 90–46		19 – Colson	14 – Colson	6 – Farrell	Edmund P. Joyce Center (6,070); South Bend, IN
Non-conference regular season
Nov 11, 2017*; 4:00 pm, FS1	No. 14	at DePaul	W 72–58	1–0	21 – Gibbs	13 – Colson	5 – Colson	Wintrust Arena (10,194); Chicago, IL
Nov 13, 2017*; 7:00 pm, ACCN Extra	No. 13	Mount St. Mary's; Maui on the Mainland	W 88–62	2–0	27 – Colson	11 – Colson	5 – Tied	Edmund P. Joyce Center (6,633); South Bend, IN
Nov 16, 2017*; 7:00 pm, ACCN Extra	No. 13	Chicago State	W 105–66	3–0	23 – Gibbs	9 – Colson	4 – Tied	Edmund P. Joyce Center (8,046); South Bend, IN
Nov 20, 2017*; 9:00 pm, ESPNU	No. 13	at Chaminade; Maui Invitational tournament quarterfinals	W 83–56	4–0	27 – Farrell	8 – Colson	4 – Tied	Lahaina Civic Center (2,400); Lahaina, HI
Nov 21, 2017*; 10:30 pm, ESPN	No. 13	vs. LSU; Maui Invitational Tournament semifinals	W 92–53	5–0	26 – Gibbs	11 – Colson	7 – Farrell	Lahaina Civic Center (2,400); Lahaina, HI
Nov 22, 2017*; 10:00 pm, ESPN2	No. 13	vs. No. 6 Wichita State; Maui Invitational Tournament finals	W 67–66	6–0	25 – Colson	11 – Colson	4 – Tied	Lahaina Civic Center (2,400); Lahaina, HI
Nov 30, 2017*; 7:00 pm, ESPN	No. 5	at No. 3 Michigan State; ACC–Big Ten Challenge	L 63–81	6–1	17 – Colson	6 – Colson	7 – Farrell	Breslin Center (14,797); East Lansing, MI
Dec 3, 2017*; 2:00 pm, ACCN Extra	No. 5	St. Francis Brooklyn	W 71–53	7–1	14 – Geben	10 – Geben	4 – Farrell	Edmund P. Joyce Center (8,911); South Bend, IN
Dec 5, 2017*; 7:00 pm, ACCN Extra	No. 9	Ball State	L 77–80	7–2	26 – Colson	7 – Mooney	8 – Farrell	Edmund P. Joyce Center (8,891); South Bend, IN
Dec 9, 2017*; 7:00 pm, CBSSN	No. 9	at Delaware	W 92–68	8–2	24 – Farrell	12 – Tied	7 – Farrell	Bob Carpenter Center (4,737); Newark, DE
Dec 16, 2017*; 2:30 pm, FOX	No. 18	vs. Indiana; Crossroads Classic	L 77–80 ^{OT}	8–3	29 – Colson	11 – Colson	8 – Farrell	Bankers Life Fieldhouse (18,680); Indianapolis, IN
Dec 19, 2017*; 7:00 pm, ESPNU		Dartmouth	W 97–87	9–3	37 – Colson	11 – Colson	6 – Farrell	Edmund P. Joyce Center (6,837); South Bend, IN
Dec 21, 2017*; 7:00 pm, ACCN Extra		Southeastern Louisiana	W 86–50	10–3	18 – Gibbs	10 – Tied	5 – Gibbs	Edmund P. Joyce Center (7,134); South Bend, IN
ACC regular season
Dec 30, 2017; 2:00 pm, ESPNU		Georgia Tech	W 68–59	11–3 (1–0)	22 – Colson	17 – Colson	6 – Pflueger	Edmund P. Joyce Center (8,441); South Bend, IN
Jan 3, 2018; 9:00 pm, ACCN		NC State	W 88–58	12–3 (2–0)	22 – Gibbs	13 – Geben	5 – Gibbs	Edmund P. Joyce Center (7,563); South Bend, IN
Jan 6, 2018; 3:15 pm, ESPN2		at Syracuse	W 51–49	13–3 (3–0)	18 – Gibbs	14 – Geben	4 – Tied	Carrier Dome (24,304); Syracuse, NY
Jan 10, 2018; 7:00 pm, ESPNU		at Georgia Tech	L 53–60	13–4 (3–1)	16 – Geben	9 – Geben	7 – Gibbs	McCamish Pavilion (7,771); Atlanta, GA
Jan 13, 2018; 6:00 pm, ESPN		No. 20 North Carolina	L 68–69	13–5 (3–2)	19 – Gibbs	9 – Geben	6 – Gibbs	Edmund P. Joyce Center (9,149); South Bend, IN
Jan 16, 2018; 7:00 pm, ESPN2		Louisville	L 78–82 ^{2OT}	13–6 (3–3)	23 – Farrell	17 – Geben	8 – Farrell	Edmund P. Joyce Center (9,076); South Bend, IN
Jan 20, 2018; 7:00 pm, ESPN		at No. 20 Clemson	L 58–67	13–7 (3–4)	18 – Gibbs	9 – Geben	6 – Farrell	Littlejohn Coliseum (9,000); Clemson, SC
Jan 27, 2018; 8:00 pm, ESPN2		Virginia Tech	L 75–80	13–8 (3–5)	27 – Gibbs	11 – Mooney	5 – Gibbs	Edmund P. Joyce Center (9,149); South Bend, IN
Jan 29, 2018; 7:00 pm, ESPN		at No. 4 Duke	L 66–88	13–9 (3–6)	22 – Gibbs	6 – Pflueger	4 – Gibbs	Cameron Indoor Stadium (9,314); Durham, NC
Feb 3, 2018; 12:00 pm, ESPN		at NC State	L 58–76	13–10 (3–7)	16 – Farrell	6 – Tied	7 – Pflueger	PNC Arena (19,500); Raleigh, NC
Feb 6, 2018; 8:00 pm, ACCN		Boston College	W 96–85	14–10 (4–7)	28 – Gibbs	11 – Geben	7 – Farrell	Edmund P. Joyce Center (8,953); South Bend, IN
Feb 10, 2018; 4:00 pm, ESPN2		Florida State	W 84–69	15–10 (5–7)	28 – Farrell	8 – Geben	5 – Farrell	Edmund P. Joyce Center (9,149); South Bend, IN
Feb 12, 2018; 7:00 pm, ESPN		at No. 14 North Carolina	L 66–83	15–11 (5–8)	18 – Tied	7 – Geben	9 – Farrell	Dean Smith Center (19,336); Chapel Hill, NC
Feb 17, 2018; 4:00 pm, ACCN		at Boston College	W 84–67	16–11 (6–8)	37 – Farrell	7 – Mooney	7 – Farrell	Conte Forum (8,606); Chestnut Hill, MA
Feb 19, 2018; 7:00 pm, ESPN		Miami (FL)	L 74–77	16–12 (6–9)	19 – Geben	7 – Geben	6 – Farrell	Edmund P. Joyce Center (9,149); South Bend, IN
Feb 24, 2018; 3:00 pm, ACCN		at Wake Forest	W 76–71	17–12 (7–9)	22 – Geben	14 – Geben	6 – Farrell	LJVM Coliseum (10,626); Winston-Salem, NC
Feb 28, 2018; 7:00 pm, ESPNU		Pittsburgh	W 73–56	18–12 (8–9)	14 – Tied	13 – Geben	4 – Pflueger	Edmund P. Joyce Center (9,007); South Bend, IN
Mar 3, 2018; 4:00 pm, ACCN		at No. 1 Virginia	L 57–62	18–13 (8–10)	24 – Colson	15 – Colson	4 – Farrell	John Paul Jones Arena (14,205); Charlottesville, VA
ACC Tournament
Mar 6, 2018; 2:00 pm, ESPN2	(10)	vs. (15) Pittsburgh; First Round	W 67–64	19–13	19 – Colson	9 – Geben	3 – Farrell	Barclays Center (10,612); Brooklyn, NY
Mar 7, 2018; 7:00 pm, ESPN2	(10)	vs. (7) Virginia Tech; Second Round	W 71–65	20–13	22 – Farrell	9 – Pflueger	7 – Gibbs	Barclays Center (17,732); Brooklyn, NY
Mar 8, 2018; 7:00 pm, ESPN	(10)	vs. (2) No. 5 Duke; Quarterfinals	L 70–88	20–14	18 – Colson	9 – Colson	12 – Farrell	Barclays Center (17,732); Brooklyn, NY
NIT
Mar 13, 2018*; 9:00 pm, ESPN	(1)	(8) Hampton; First Round – Notre Dame Bracket	W 84–63	21–14	17 – Geben	12 – Colson	6 – Tied	Edmund P. Joyce Center (2,101); South Bend, IN
Mar 17, 2018*; 12:00 pm, ESPN	(1)	(4) Penn State; Second Round – Notre Dame Bracket	L 63–73	21–15	16 – Colson	9 – Colson	4 – Tied	Edmund P. Joyce Center (4,023); South Bend, IN
*Non-conference game. ^{#}Rankings from AP Poll. (#) Tournament seedings in parentheses. All times are in Eastern Time.

== Rankings ==
Ranking movements Legend: ██ Increase in ranking ██ Decrease in ranking — = Not ranked RV = Received votes
	Week																			
Poll	Pre	1	2	3	4	5	6	7	8	9	10	11	12	13	14	15	16	17	18	Final
AP	14	13	13	5	9	18	RV	RV	RV	RV	—	—	—	—	—	—				Not released
Coaches	14	14^	12	5	8	18	RV	RV	RV	25	RV	—	—	—	—	—				

^Coaches did not release a Week 2 poll.
*AP does not release post-NCAA tournament rankings
