= 2017–18 Boston College Eagles men's basketball team =

American college basketball season

2017–18 Boston College Eagles men's basketball

NIT, First Round
- Conference: Atlantic Coast Conference
- Record: 19–16 (7–11 ACC)
- Head coach: Jim Christian (4th season)
- Assistant coaches: Scott Spinelli; Bill Wuczynski; Chris Cheeks
- Home arena: Conte Forum

2017–18 ACC men's basketball standings
| | Conf. | | | | Overall |
| Team | W | | L | PCT | W | | L | PCT |
|---|---|---|---|---|---|---|---|---|
| No. 1 Virginia † | 17 | – | 1 | .944 | 31 | – | 3 | .912 |
| No. 9 Duke | 13 | – | 5 | .722 | 29 | – | 8 | .784 |
| No. 22 Miami (FL) | 11 | – | 7 | .611 | 22 | – | 10 | .688 |
| No. 20 Clemson | 11 | – | 7 | .611 | 25 | – | 10 | .714 |
| NC State | 11 | – | 7 | .611 | 21 | – | 12 | .636 |
| No. 10 North Carolina | 11 | – | 7 | .611 | 26 | – | 11 | .703 |
| Virginia Tech | 10 | – | 8 | .556 | 21 | – | 12 | .636 |
| Florida State | 9 | – | 9 | .500 | 23 | – | 12 | .657 |
| Louisville | 9 | – | 9 | .500 | 22 | – | 14 | .611 |
| Notre Dame | 8 | – | 10 | .444 | 21 | – | 15 | .583 |
| Syracuse | 8 | – | 10 | .444 | 23 | – | 14 | .622 |
| Boston College | 7 | – | 11 | .389 | 19 | – | 16 | .543 |
| Georgia Tech | 6 | – | 12 | .333 | 13 | – | 19 | .406 |
| Wake Forest | 4 | – | 14 | .222 | 11 | – | 20 | .355 |
| Pittsburgh | 0 | – | 18 | .000 | 8 | – | 24 | .250 |
† 2018 ACC tournament winner Rankings from AP poll

The 2017–18 Boston College Eagles men's basketball team represented Boston College during the 2017–18 NCAA Division I men's basketball season. The Eagles, led by fourth-year head coach Jim Christian, played their home games at the Conte Forum as members of the Atlantic Coast Conference. They finished the season 19–16, 7–11 in ACC play to finish in 12th place. In the ACC tournament, they defeated Georgia Tech and NC State before losing in the quarterfinals to Clemson. They received an invitation to the National Invitation Tournament where they lost in the first round to Western Kentucky.

== Previous season ==
The Eagles finished the 2016–17 season 9–23, 2–16 in ACC play to finish in last place. As the No. 15 seed in the ACC tournament, they lost in the first round to Wake Forest.

== Offseason ==
=== Departures ===
| Name | Number | Pos. | Height | Weight | Year | Hometown | Notes |
|---|---|---|---|---|---|---|---|
| Connar Tava | 2 | F | 6'6" | 250 | RS Senior | Macomb, MI | Graduated |
| Ty Graves | 3 | G | 6'0" | 165 | Freshman | Greensboro, NC | Transferred to Saint Louis |
| Garland Owens | 5 | F | 6'5" | 222 | Senior | Gaithersburg, MD | Graduated |
| A. J. Turner | 11 | G/F | 6'7" | 188 | Sophomore | Mount Clemens, MI | Transferred to Northwestern |
| Aser Ghebremichael | 14 | F | 6'8" | 195 | Sophomore | Somerville, MA | Walk-on; didn't return |
| Mo Jeffers | 15 | F | 6'9" | 240 | RS Senior | Washington, D.C. | Graduated |

=== Incoming transfers ===
| Name | Number | Pos. | Height | Weight | Year | Hometown | Previous School |
|---|---|---|---|---|---|---|---|
| Deontae Hawkins | 23 | F | 6'8" | 220 | RS Senior | Dayton, OH | Transferred from Illinois State. Will be eligible to play immediately since Hawkins graduated from Illinois State. |

=== Recruiting class of 2017 ===
College recruiting information
| Name | Hometown | School | Height | Weight | Commit date |
|---|---|---|---|---|---|
| Luka Kraljević #56 PF | Crown Point, IN | Don Bosco Prep | 6 ft 10 in (2.08 m) | N/A | Nov 16, 2016 |
| Luka Kraljević #56 PF | Recruit ratings: Scout: Rivals: 247Sports: ESPN: | | | | |
| Steffon Mitchell; SF | Shakopee, MN | Sunrise Christian Academy | 6 ft 8 in (2.03 m) | 225 lb (102 kg) | May 5, 2017 |
| Steffon Mitchell; SF | Recruit ratings: Scout: Rivals: 247Sports: ESPN: | | | | |
| Vin Baker Jr. SF | Old Saybrook, CT | Hamden Hall Country Day School | 6 ft 9 in (2.06 m) | 190 lb (86 kg) | May 1, 2017 |
| Vin Baker Jr. SF | Recruit ratings: Scout: Rivals: 247Sports: ESPN: | | | | |
| Avery Wilson; SG | Forest Park, GA | Forest Park High School | 6 ft 3 in (1.91 m) | 215 lb (98 kg) | Apr 21, 2017 |
| Avery Wilson; SG | Recruit ratings: Scout: Rivals: 247Sports: ESPN: | | | | |
Overall recruit ranking:
Note: In many cases, Scout, Rivals, 247Sports, On3, and ESPN may conflict in their listings of height and weight.; In these cases, the average was taken. ESPN grades are on a 100-point scale.; Sources: "2017 Team Ranking". Rivals.

=== Recruiting class of 2018 ===
College recruiting information (2018)
| Name | Hometown | School | Height | Weight | Commit date |
|---|---|---|---|---|---|
| Wynston Tabbs #51 SG | Leonardtown, MD | Saint Mary's Ryken | 6 ft 3 in (1.91 m) | 189 lb (86 kg) | Aug 11, 2017 |
| Wynston Tabbs #51 SG | Recruit ratings: Scout: Rivals: 247Sports: ESPN: | | | | |
| Jairus Hamilton #14 SF | Concord, NC | Cannon School | 6 ft 8 in (2.03 m) | 210 lb (95 kg) | Jan 11, 2018 |
| Jairus Hamilton #14 SF | Recruit ratings: Scout: Rivals: 247Sports: ESPN: | | | | |
Overall recruit ranking:
Note: In many cases, Scout, Rivals, 247Sports, On3, and ESPN may conflict in their listings of height and weight.; In these cases, the average was taken. ESPN grades are on a 100-point scale.; Sources: "2018 Team Ranking". Rivals.

== Roster ==
2017–18 Boston College Eagles men's basketball team
Players
Coaches

| Pos. | # | Name | Height | Weight | Year | Previous school | Hometown |
|---|---|---|---|---|---|---|---|
| G | 0 | Ky Bowman | 6 ft 1 in (1.85 m) | 188 lb (85 kg) | So | Havelock High School | Havelock, North Carolina |
| G | 1 | Jerome Robinson | 6 ft 5 in (1.96 m) | 191 lb (87 kg) | Jr | Needham B. Broughton High School | Raleigh, North Carolina |
| G | 2 | Avery Wilson | 6 ft 3 in (1.91 m) | 220 lb (100 kg) | Fr | Forest Park High School | Forest Park, GA |
| F | 3 | Mike Sagay | 6 ft 7 in (2.01 m) | 208 lb (94 kg) | So | St. Thomas More School (CT) | Bloomfield, Connecticut |
| F | 10 | Ervins Meznieks | 6 ft 7 in (2.01 m) | 231 lb (105 kg) | Jr | Riga Teika Secondary School | Riga, Latvia |
| F | 11 | Vin Baker Jr. | 6 ft 7 in (2.01 m) | 177 lb (80 kg) | Fr | Hamden Hall Country Day School | Old Saybrook, Connecticut |
| F/C | 12 | John Carlos Reyes | 6 ft 10 in (2.08 m) | 224 lb (102 kg) | RS So | Sound Doctrine Christian Academy | Lawrenceville, Georgia |
| F | 13 | Luka Kraljević | 6 ft 10 in (2.08 m) | 229 lb (104 kg) | Fr | Don Bosco Prep | Domžale, Slovenia |
| G/F | 20 | Gordon Gehan (W) | 6 ft 5 in (1.96 m) | 220 lb (100 kg) | Jr | Episcopal School of Dallas | Dallas, Texas |
| F | 21 | Nik Popovic | 6 ft 11 in (2.11 m) | 243 lb (110 kg) | So | Sagemont School | Banja Luka, Bosnia and Herzegovina |
| G | 22 | Matt DiLuccio (W) | 5 ft 11 in (1.8 m) | 180 lb (82 kg) | So | South Side High School | Rockville Centre, New York |
| F | 23 | Deontae Hawkins | 6 ft 8 in (2.03 m) | 220 lb (100 kg) | RS Sr | Illinois State | Dayton, Ohio |
| G | 25 | Jordan Chatman | 6 ft 5 in (1.96 m) | 200 lb (91 kg) | RS Jr | BYU | Vancouver, Washington |
| F | 41 | Steffon Mitchell | 6 ft 8 in (2.03 m) | 222 lb (101 kg) | Fr | Sunrise Christian Academy | Shakopee, Minnesota |

Head coach

- Jim Christian (Rhode Island)

Assistant coach(es)

- Scott Spinelli (Boston University)
- Bill Wuczynski (UNLV)
- Chris Cheeks (VCU)

Legend

- (C) Team captain
- (S) Suspended
- (I) Ineligible
- (W) Walk-on
- Injured
- Current redshirt

Roster

== Schedule and results ==
| Date time, TV | Rank^{#} | Opponent^{#} | Result | Record | High points | High rebounds | High assists | Site (attendance) city, state |
Regular season
| Nov 10, 2017*; 7:30 pm, ACCN Extra | | Maine; Hall of Fame Tip Off | W 85–65 | 1–0 | 18 – Tied | 15 – Hawkins | 4 – Robinson | Conte Forum (4,522); Chestnut Hill, MA |
| Nov 12, 2017*; 1:00 pm, ACCN Extra | | South Carolina State | W 91–52 | 2–0 | 21 – Mitchell | 11 – Hawkins | 6 – Bowman | Conte Forum (3,104); Chestnut Hill, MA |
| Nov 14, 2017*; 7:00 pm, ACCN Extra | | Sacred Heart; Hall of Fame Tip-Off Classic | W 73–53 | 3–0 | 22 – Hawkins | 9 – Mitchell | 7 – Bowman | Conte Forum (3,130); Chestnut Hill, MA |
| Nov 18, 2017*; 12:00 pm, ESPN3 | | vs. Texas Tech; Hall of Fame Tip-Off Classic Naismith Bracket semifinals | L 64–75 | 3–1 | 15 – Bowman | 7 – Tied | 4 – Bowman | Mohegan Sun Arena; Uncasville, CT |
| Nov 19, 2017*; 3:00 pm, ESPN2 | | vs. La Salle; Hall of Fame Tip-Off Classic Naismith Bracket third place game | W 82–61 | 4–1 | 25 – Robinson | 11 – Hawkins | 7 – Bowman | Mohegan Sun Arena; Uncasville, CT |
| Nov 22, 2017*; 4:00 pm, ACCN Extra | | Colgate | W 83–79 | 5–1 | 26 – Robinson | 11 – Hawkins | 8 – Bowman | Conte Forum (3,277); Chestnut Hill, MA |
| Nov 25, 2017*; 8:00 pm, FS1 | | at Providence | L 66–86 | 5–2 | 19 – Tied | 12 – Hawkins | 4 – Tied | Dunkin' Donuts Center (10,806); Providence, RI |
| Nov 29, 2017*; 9:00 pm, ESPNU | | at Nebraska; ACC–Big Ten Challenge | L 62–71 | 5–3 | 17 – Robinson | 9 – Reyes | 6 – Bowman | Pinnacle Bank Arena (10,742); Lincoln, NE |
| Dec 2, 2017*; 7:00 pm, ESPN3 | | at Hartford | W 73–61 | 6–3 | 23 – Robinson | 11 – Popovich | 4 – Tied | Chase Arena at Reich Family Pavilion (3,348); Hartford, CT |
| Dec 9, 2017; 12:00 pm, ESPN | | No. 1 Duke | W 89–84 | 7–3 (1–0) | 30 – Bowman | 10 – Bowman | 9 – Bowman | Conte Forum (8,606); Chestnut Hill, MA |
| Dec 12, 2017*; 7:00 pm, ACCN Extra | | Columbia | W 81–66 | 8–3 | 21 – Robinson | 12 – Bowman | 6 – Bowman | Conte Forum (3,989); Chestnut Hill, MA |
| Dec 17, 2017*; 1:00 pm, ACCN Extra | | Central Connecticut | W 84–65 | 9–3 | 15 – Chatman | 14 – Mitchell | 4 – Robinson | Conte Forum (4,669); Chestnut Hill, MA |
| Dec 23, 2017*; 1:00 pm, ACCN Extra | | Richmond | W 78–73 | 10–3 | 30 – Chatman | 10 – Popovic | 3 – Bowman | Conte Forum (5,538); Chestnut Hill, MA |
| Dec 30, 2017; 2:00 pm, RSN/NESN | | at No. 9 Virginia | L 58–59 | 10–4 (1–1) | 29 – Robinson | 9 – Bowman | 1 – 4 tied | John Paul Jones Arena (14,538); Charlottesville, VA |
| Jan 3, 2018; 7:00 pm, RSN/NESN | | No. 25 Clemson | L 70–74 | 10–5 (1–2) | 28 – Robinson | 9 – Bowman | 6 – Bowman | Conte Forum (3,911); Chestnut Hill, MA |
| Jan 6, 2018; 4:00 pm, RSN/NESN | | Wake Forest | W 77–71 | 11–5 (2–2) | 25 – Robinson | 10 – Bowman | 5 – Robinson | Conte Forum (5,247); Chestnut Hill, MA |
| Jan 9, 2018; 8:00 pm, ACCN | | at No. 20 North Carolina | L 66–96 | 11–6 (2–3) | 21 – Bowman | 10 – Mitchell | 5 – Bowman | Dean E. Smith Center (17,104); Chapel Hill, NC |
| Jan 13, 2018*; 1:00 pm, ACCN Extra | | Dartmouth | W 86–72 | 12–6 | 19 – Bowman | 10 – Mitchell | 6 – Bowman | Conte Forum (4,953); Chestnut Hill, MA |
| Jan 15, 2018; 7:00 pm, ESPNU | | Florida State | W 81–75 | 13–6 (3–3) | 19 – Tied | 13 – Bowman | 5 – Bowman | Conte Forum (5,867); Chestnut Hill, MA |
| Jan 21, 2018; 12:00 pm, ACCN | | at Louisville | L 69–77 | 13–7 (3–4) | 19 – Robinson | 11 – Mitchell | 4 – Robinson | KFC Yum! Center (16,827); Louisville, KY |
| Jan 24, 2018; 7:00 pm, ESPNU | | at Syracuse | L 63–81 | 13–8 (3–5) | 21 – Robinson | 5 – Tied | 4 – Tied | Carrier Dome (21,262); Syracuse, NY |
| Jan 31, 2018; 9:00 pm, RSN/NESN | | Virginia Tech | L 80–85 ^{OT} | 13–9 (3–6) | 32 – Robinson | 12 – Mitchell | 8 – Bowman | Conte Forum (4,091); Chestnut Hill, MA |
| Feb 4, 2018; 12:00 pm, ESPNU | | Georgia Tech | W 80–72 | 14–9 (4–6) | 19 – Tied | 10 – Mitchell | 5 – Robinson | Conte Forum (4,763); Chestnut Hill, MA |
| Feb 6, 2018; 8:00 pm, ACCN | | at Notre Dame | L 85–96 | 14–10 (4–7) | 46 – Robinson | 11 – Mitchell | 5 – Bowman | Edmund P. Joyce Center (8,953); South Bend, IN |
| Feb 10, 2018; 2:00 pm, RSN/NESN | | No. 25 Miami (FL) | W 72–70 | 15–10 (5–7) | 29 – Robinson | 12 – Bowman | 6 – Bowman | Conte Forum (7,740); Chestnut Hill, MA |
| Feb 13, 2018; 7:00 pm, ESPNews | | at Pittsburgh | W 81–58 | 16–10 (6–7) | 27 – Robinson | 14 – Popovic | 7 – Bowman | Peterson Events Center (2,835); Pittsburgh, PA |
| Feb 17, 2018; 4:00 pm, ACCN | | Notre Dame | L 67–84 | 16–11 (6–8) | 29 – Robinson | 11 – Popovic | 3 – tied | Conte Forum (8,606); Chestnut Hill, MA |
| Feb 20, 2018; 7:00 pm, RSN/NESN | | at NC State | L 66–82 | 16–12 (6–9) | 21 – Bowman | 13 – Mitchell | 3 – Robinson | PNC Arena (15,225); Raleigh, NC |
| Feb 24, 2018; 2:00 pm, RSN/NESN | | at Miami (FL) | L 78–79 | 16–13 (6–10) | 30 – Robinson | 5 – tied | 7 – Mitchell | Watsco Center (7,010); Coral Gables, FL |
| Feb 28, 2018; 9:00 pm, RSN/NESN | | Syracuse | W 85–70 | 17–13 (7–10) | 23 – Bowman | 6 – Popovic | 7 – Robinson | Conte Forum (5,718); Chestnut Hill, MA |
| Mar 3, 2018; 2:00 pm, RSN/NESN | | at Florida State | L 76–85 | 17–14 (7–11) | 22 – Bowman | 11 – Robinson | 5 – Bowman | Donald L. Tucker Center (9,825); Tallahassee, FL |
ACC tournament
| Mar 6, 2018; 12:00 pm, ESPN2 | (12) | vs. (13) Georgia Tech; First round | W 87–77 | 18–14 | 26 – Bowman | 11 – Mitchell | 6 – Bowman | Barclays Center (10,612); Brooklyn, NY |
| Mar 7, 2018; 2:00 pm, ESPN | (12) | vs. (5) NC State; Second round | W 91–87 | 19–14 | 26 – Robinson | 15 – Mitchell | 5 – Robinson | Barclays Center (17,732); Brooklyn, NY |
| Mar 8, 2018; 2:00 pm, ESPN | (12) | vs. (4) No. 19 Clemson; Quarterfinals | L 82–90 | 19–15 | 23 – Bowman | 9 – Mitchell | 4 – Bowman | Barclays Center (17,732); Brooklyn, NY |
NIT
| Mar 13, 2018*; 8:00 pm, ESPN3 | (5) | at (4) Western Kentucky; First Round – USC Bracket | L 62–79 | 19–16 | 18 – Bowman | 10 – Mitchell | 3 – Tied | E. A. Diddle Arena (6,176); Bowling Green, KY |
*Non-conference game. ^{#}Rankings from AP Poll. (#) Tournament seedings in parentheses. All times are in Eastern Time.

Source.

== See also ==
- 2017–18 Boston College Eagles women's basketball team
