= 2017 Maui Invitational =

2017 Maui Invitational Tournament
- Season: 2017–18
- Teams: 8
- Finals site: Lahaina Civic Center, Maui, Hawaii
- Champions: Notre Dame (1st title)
- Runner-up: Wichita State (1st title game)
- Semifinalists: Marquette (2nd semifinal); LSU (2nd semifinal)
- Winning coach: Mike Brey (1st title)
- MVP: Matt Farrell (Notre Dame)

The 2017 Maui Invitational Tournament was an early-season college basketball tournament that was played for the 34th time. The tournament began in 1984, and was part of the 2017–18 NCAA Division I men's basketball season. The Championship Round was played at the Lahaina Civic Center in Maui, Hawaii from November 20 to 22. Opening round games previously played at campus sites were discontinued.

Notre Dame defeated Wichita State in the championship game to win the Tournament.

== Bracket ==
Fifth Place Game; November 22
VCU	60
Michigan	68
Seventh Place Game
California	72
Chaminade	96

Consolation 2nd Round; November 21
VCU	83
California	69
Chaminade	64
Michigan	102

First round November 20
Marquette	94
VCU	83
6	Wichita State	92
California	82
13	Notre Dame	83
Chaminade	56
3	Michigan	75
LSU	77

Semifinals; November 21
Marquette	66
6	Wichita State	80
13	Notre Dame	92
LSU	53

Championship; November 22
6	Wichita State	66
13	Notre Dame	67
Third-place game
Marquette	94
LSU	84
