= 2017–18 Loyola Ramblers men's basketball team =

American college basketball season

2017–18 Loyola Ramblers men's basketball

Missouri Valley regular season and tournament champions Savannah Invitational champions

NCAA tournament, Final Four
- Conference: Missouri Valley Conference

Ranking
- Coaches: No. 7
- Record: 32–6 (15–3 MVC)
- Head coach: Porter Moser (7th season)
- Assistant coaches: Bryan Mullins; Matt Gordon; Drew Valentine
- Home arena: Joseph J. Gentile Arena

2017–18 Missouri Valley Conference men's basketball standings
	Conf.				Overall
Team	W		L	PCT	W		L	PCT
Loyola Chicago †	15	–	3	.833	32	–	6	.842
Southern Illinois	11	–	7	.611	20	–	13	.606
Illinois State	10	–	8	.556	18	–	15	.545
Drake	10	–	8	.556	17	–	17	.500
Bradley	9	–	9	.500	20	–	13	.606
Indiana State	8	–	10	.444	13	–	18	.419
Missouri State	7	–	11	.389	18	–	15	.545
Evansville	7	–	11	.389	17	–	15	.531
Northern Iowa	7	–	11	.389	16	–	16	.500
Valparaiso	6	–	12	.333	15	–	17	.469
† 2018 MVC tournament winner

The 2017–18 Loyola Ramblers men's basketball team represented Loyola University Chicago during the 2017–18 NCAA Division I men's basketball season. The Ramblers, led by seventh-year head coach Porter Moser, played their home games at the Joseph J. Gentile Arena in Chicago. They were members of the Missouri Valley Conference. With a win against Evansville on February 18, 2018, Loyola clinched at least a share of its first-ever Missouri Valley Conference regular season championship. With a win over Southern Illinois on February 21, the Ramblers clinched the outright MVC championship. The Ramblers defeated Northern Iowa, Bradley, and Illinois State to win the MVC tournament. As a result, the Ramblers received the conference's automatic bid to the NCAA tournament. As the No. 11 seed in the South Region, they upset No. 6-seeded Miami (FL) on a last second three-pointer. In the Second Round, they defeated No. 3-seeded Tennessee to earn the school's first trip to the Sweet Sixteen since 1985. They then defeated Nevada in the Sweet Sixteen and Kansas State in the Elite Eight to advance to the Final Four for the first time since 1963. Their Cinderella run ended with a loss to the eventual runner-up Michigan in the national semifinal. The Ramblers' run also made the team's then-98-year-old chaplain Sister Jean a national and even international media figure.

== Previous season ==
The Ramblers finished the 2016–17 season 18–14, 8–10 in MVC play to finish in fifth place. They lost to Southern Illinois in the quarterfinals of the MVC tournament.

== Offseason ==
=== Departures ===
Name	Number	Pos.	Height	Weight	Year	Hometown	Reason for departure
Glorind Lisha	1	G	6'2"	185	Senior	Chicago, IL	Walk-on; graduated
Matt Chastain	22	G/F	6'6"	190	Freshman	Leroy, IL	Transferred to Illinois State
Tyson Smith	25	G	6'2"	185	Junior	Baltimore, MD	Walk-on; didn't return
Byron Burt	30	G	6'5"	190	Junior	Chicago, IL	Eligibility ended
Maurice Kirby	31	F	6'9"	240	Junior	Chandler, AZ	Graduate transferred to IUPUI
Vlatko Granic	32	F	6'8"	230	Junior	Split, Croatia	Playing professional in Croatia
Milton Doyle	35	G	6'4"	185	RS Senior	Chicago, IL	Graduated

=== Incoming transfers ===
Name	Number	Pos.	Height	Weight	Year	Hometown	Previous School
Carson Shanks	32	C	7'0"	230	RS Senior	Prior Lake, MN	Transferred from North Dakota. Was eligible to play immediately because he graduated from North Dakota.
Aher Uguak	30	G/F	6'7"	206	Sophomore	Edmonton, AB	Transferred from New Mexico. Under NCAA transfer rules, Uguak had to sit out the 2017–18 season, and had three remaining years of eligibility.

=== 2017 recruiting class ===
College recruiting information
Name	Hometown	School	Height	Weight	Commit date
Cameron Krutwig #52 C	Algonquin, IL	H. D. Jacobs High School	6 ft 9 in (2.06 m)	250 lb (110 kg)	Aug 2, 2016
Cameron Krutwig #52 C	Recruit ratings: Scout: Rivals: 247Sports: ESPN: (70)				
Christian Negron #29 PF	San Juan, Puerto Rico	Larkin High School	6 ft 6 in (1.98 m)	220 lb (100 kg)	Oct 18, 2016
Christian Negron #29 PF	Recruit ratings: Scout: Rivals: 247Sports: ESPN: (80)				
Overall recruit ranking: Scout: #93 Rivals: #58 247Sports: #103
Note: In many cases, Scout, Rivals, 247Sports, On3, and ESPN may conflict in their listings of height and weight.; In these cases, the average was taken. ESPN grades are on a 100-point scale.; Sources: "2017 Team Ranking". Rivals.

== Preseason ==
In the conference's preseason poll, the Ramblers were picked to finish in third place in the MVC. Senior forward Aundre Jackson was named to the preseason All-MVC first team.

== Roster ==
2017–18 Loyola Ramblers men's basketball team
Players
Coaches

Pos.	#	Name	Height	Weight	Year	Previous school	Hometown
G/F	0	Donte Ingram	6 ft 6 in (1.98 m)	215 lb (98 kg)	Sr	Simeon	Chicago, IL
G	1	Lucas Williamson	6 ft 4 in (1.93 m)	190 lb (86 kg)	Fr	Whitney Young	Chicago, IL
G	2	Jake Baughman (W)	6 ft 3 in (1.91 m)	180 lb (82 kg)	So	Central Catholic	Bloomington, IL
G	4	Bruno Skokna	6 ft 4 in (1.93 m)	175 lb (79 kg)	So	Košarkaški klub Gorica	Zagreb, Croatia
G	5	Marques Townes	6 ft 4 in (1.93 m)	210 lb (95 kg)	RS Jr	St. Joseph; Fairleigh Dickinson	Edison, NJ
G	10	Adarius Avery	6 ft 5 in (1.96 m)	190 lb (86 kg)	Jr	Arlington; Connors State CC	Arlington, TN
F	12	Christian Negrón	6 ft 7 in (2.01 m)	215 lb (98 kg)	Fr	Larkin	Elgin, IL
G	13	Clayton Custer	6 ft 1 in (1.85 m)	185 lb (84 kg)	RS Jr	Blue Valley Northwest; Iowa State	Overland Park, KS
G	14	Ben Richardson	6 ft 3 in (1.91 m)	195 lb (88 kg)	Sr	Blue Valley Northwest	Overland Park, KS
G	23	Cameron Satterwhite	6 ft 4 in (1.93 m)	175 lb (79 kg)	So	Gilbert Christian	Gilbert, AZ
F	24	Aundre Jackson	6 ft 5 in (1.96 m)	230 lb (104 kg)	Sr	Kennedale; McLennan CC	Kennedale, TX
C	25	Cameron Krutwig	6 ft 9 in (2.06 m)	260 lb (118 kg)	Fr	Jacobs	Algonquin, IL
F	30	Aher Uguak (redshirt)	6 ft 7 in (2.01 m)	210 lb (95 kg)	So	Harry Ainlay; New Mexico	Edmonton, AB
F	31	Dylan Boehm (W)	6 ft 5 in (1.96 m)	205 lb (93 kg)	Fr	Loyola	Los Angeles, CA
C	32	Carson Shanks	7 ft 0 in (2.13 m)	245 lb (111 kg)	RS Sr	Prior Lake; North Dakota	Prior Lake, MN
F	44	Nick Dinardi (W)	6 ft 7 in (2.01 m)	225 lb (102 kg)	Sr	Providence Catholic	Palos Park, IL

Head coach

- Porter Moser (Creighton)

Assistant coach(es)

- Bryan Mullins (Southern Illinois)
- Matt Gordon (Illinois State)
- Drew Valentine (Oakland)

Legend

- (C) Team captain
- (S) Suspended
- (I) Ineligible
- (W) Walk-on
- Injured
- Current redshirt

Roster

== Schedule and results ==
The Ramblers won at least eight of their first nine games for the first time since the 1965–66 Ramblers. In their tenth game on December 6, they upset No. 5 ranked Florida, for the school's first win against a ranked opponent since a February 15, 2009 win over No. 15 Butler and the first against a top 5 team since a December 22, 1984 victory over No. 4 Illinois.

Date time, TV	Rank^{#}	Opponent^{#}	Result	Record	High points	High rebounds	High assists	Site (attendance) city, state
Exhibition
Oct 28, 2017*; 7:00 pm		Lewis	W 79–63		15 – Norton	10 – Blaylock	4 – Pischke	Joseph J. Gentile Arena (1,103); Chicago, IL
Non-conference regular season
Nov 10, 2017*; 7:00 pm, ESPN3		Wright State	W 84–80	1–0	21 – Ingram	7 – Krutwig	6 – Richardson	Joseph J. Gentile Arena (2,814); Chicago, IL
Nov 12, 2017*; 2:00 pm, ESPN3		Eureka	W 96–69	2–0	14 – Tied	9 – Jackson	5 – Townes	Joseph J. Gentile Arena (1,135); Chicago, IL
Nov 16, 2017*; 7:00 pm, NBCSC+		at UMKC	W 66–56	3–0	20 – Custer	9 – Townes	3 – Tied	Municipal Auditorium (1,482); Kansas City, MO
Nov 19, 2017*; 2:00 pm, ESPN3		Samford; Savannah Invitational	W 88–67	4–0	18 – Tied	8 – Tied	9 – Custer	Joseph J. Gentile Arena (1,289); Chicago, IL
Nov 21, 2017*; 7:00 pm, ESPN3		Mississippi Valley State; Savannah Invitational	W 63–50	5–0	13 – Custer	10 – Ingram	5 – Townes	Joseph J. Gentile Arena (1,133); Chicago, IL
Nov 24, 2017*; 4:00 pm		vs. UNC Wilmington; Savannah Invitational	W 102–78	6–0	25 – Jackson	9 – Ingram	4 – Custer	Savannah Civic Center (485); Savannah, GA
Nov 25, 2017*; 4:00 pm		vs. Kent State; Savannah Invitational	W 75–60	7–0	18 – Ingram	11 – Tied	6 – Custer	Savannah Civic Center (547); Savannah, GA
Nov 28, 2017*; 8:00 pm		at Boise State; MW–MVC Challenge	L 53–87	7–1	14 – Jackson	5 – Krutwig	4 – Custer	Taco Bell Arena (3,738); Boise, ID
Dec 2, 2017*; 3:00 pm, NBCSC		UIC	W 85–61	8–1	23 – Jackson	6 – Ingram	7 – Krutwig	Joseph J. Gentile Arena (3,024); Chicago, IL
Dec 6, 2017*; 7:00 pm, SECN		at No. 5 Florida	W 65–59	9–1	23 – Jackson	8 – Tied	3 – Tied	O'Connell Center (9,012); Gainesville, FL
Dec 9, 2017*; 3:00 pm, ESPN3		Norfolk State	W 80–52	10–1	18 – Skokna	8 – Krutwig	3 – Tied	Joseph J. Gentile Arena (1,904); Chicago, IL
Dec 16, 2017*; 1:00 pm, FSW		at Milwaukee	L 56–73	10–2	13 – Ingram	10 – Ingram	2 – Tied	UW–Milwaukee Panther Arena (1,705); Milwaukee, WI
Missouri Valley regular season
Dec 22, 2017; 8:00 pm, NBCSC		at Missouri State	L 59–64	10–3 (0–1)	18 – Krutwig	6 – Ingram	3 – Williamson	JQH Arena (4,583); Springfield, MO
Dec 30, 2017; 3:00 pm, NBCSC		Evansville	W 66–59	11–3 (1–1)	19 – Townes	5 – Tied	3 – Tied	Joseph J. Gentile Arena (1,914); Chicago, IL
Jan 3, 2018; 7:00 pm, NBCSC		Indiana State	L 57–61	11–4 (1–2)	16 – Ingram	8 – Jackson	3 – Richardson	Joseph J. Gentile Arena (1,501); Chicago, IL
Jan 7, 2018; 3:00 pm, ESPNU		at Northern Iowa	W 56–50	12–4 (2–2)	11 – Custer	6 – Ingram	4 – Custer	McLeod Center (3,765); Cedar Falls, IA
Jan 10, 2018; 7:00 pm, ESPN3		at Illinois State	W 68–61	13–4 (3–2)	15 – Jackson	5 – Tied	5 – Richardson	Redbird Arena (4,466); Normal, IL
Jan 13, 2018; 3:00 pm, NBCSC		Bradley	W 81–65	14–4 (4–2)	21 – Krutwig	13 – Krutwig	3 – Townes	Joseph J. Gentile Arena (2,814); Chicago, IL
Jan 17, 2018; 7:00 pm, NBCSC+		Southern Illinois	W 79–65	15–4 (5–2)	25 – Ingram	9 – Krutwig	6 – Richardson	Joseph J. Gentile Arena (2,439); Chicago, IL
Jan 21, 2018; 3:00 pm, ESPNU		at Valparaiso	W 70–54	16–4 (6–2)	18 – Custer	7 – Tied	4 – Custer	Athletics–Recreation Center (4,040); Valparaiso, IN
Jan 24, 2018; 7:00 pm, ESPN3		at Drake	W 80–57	17–4 (7–2)	17 – Townes	7 – Krutwig	8 – Custer	Knapp Center (3,522); Des Moines, IA
Jan 28, 2018; 3:00 pm, ESPNU		Northern Iowa	W 70–47	18–4 (8–2)	21 – Custer	8 – Tied	3 – Tied	Joseph J. Gentile Arena (2,658); Chicago, IL
Jan 31, 2018; 7:00 pm, NBCSC		at Bradley	L 67–69	18–5 (8–3)	23 – Custer	8 – Krutwig	6 – Richardson	Carver Arena (5,753); Peoria, IL
Feb 3, 2018; 1:00 pm, CBSSN		Missouri State	W 97–75	19–5 (9–3)	23 – Custer	7 – Tied	6 – Custer	Joseph J. Gentile Arena (3,592); Chicago, IL
Feb 7, 2018; 7:00 pm, NBCSC		Drake	W 72–57	20–5 (10–3)	17 – Krutwig	10 – Ingram	6 – Richardson	Joseph J. Gentile Arena (2,802); Chicago, IL
Feb 10, 2018; 1:00 pm, ESPN3		at Indiana State	W 75–71	21–5 (11–3)	17 – Ingram	6 – Tied	4 – Richardson	Hulman Center (4,328); Terre Haute, IN
Feb 14, 2018; 7:00 pm, ESPN3		Valparaiso	W 80–71	22–5 (12–3)	20 – Custer	7 – Tied	4 – Ingram	Joseph J. Gentile Arena (2,091); Chicago, IL
Feb 18, 2018; 3:00 pm, ESPN3		at Evansville	W 76–66	23–5 (13–3)	22 – Townes	7 – Custer	6 – Custer	Ford Center (4,887); Evansville, IN
Feb 21, 2018; 7:00 pm, ESPN3		at Southern Illinois	W 75–56	24–5 (14–3)	16 – Custer	7 – Jackson	8 – Richardson	SIU Arena (6,036); Carbondale, IL
Feb 24, 2018; 1:00 pm, ESPN2		Illinois State	W 68–61	25–5 (15–3)	16 – Krutwig	8 – Ingram	7 – Custer	Joseph J. Gentile Arena (4,963); Chicago, IL
Missouri Valley Tournament
Mar 2, 2018; 12:00 pm, ESPN3	(1)	vs. (9) Northern Iowa; Quarterfinal	W 54–50	26–5	13 – Tied	8 – Ingram	6 – Richardson	Scottrade Center (6,410); St. Louis, MO
Mar 3, 2018; 2:35 pm, CBSSN	(1)	vs. (5) Bradley; Semifinal	W 62–54	27–5	12 – Tied	8 – Ingram	5 – Richardson	Scottrade Center (8,415); St. Louis, MO
Mar 4, 2018; 1:05 pm, CBS	(1)	vs. (3) Illinois State; Championship	W 65–49	28–5	18 – Ingram	9 – Krutwig	6 – Custer	Scottrade Center (8,056); St. Louis, MO
NCAA tournament
Mar 15, 2018*; 2:10 pm, truTV	(11 S)	vs. (6 S) No. 22 Miami (FL); First round	W 64–62	29–5	14 – Custer	7 – Ingram	8 – Richardson	American Airlines Center (15,802); Dallas, TX
Mar 17, 2018*; 6:10 pm, TNT	(11 S)	vs. (3 S) No. 13 Tennessee; Second round	W 63–62	30–5	16 – Jackson	6 – Townes	4 – Krutwig	American Airlines Center (18,642); Dallas, TX
Mar 22, 2018*; 6:07 pm, CBS	(11 S)	vs. (7 S) No. 24 Nevada; Sweet Sixteen	W 69–68	31–5	18 – Townes	5 – Krutwig	5 – Townes	Philips Arena (15,616); Atlanta, GA
Mar 24, 2018*; 5:09 pm, TBS	(11 S)	vs. (9 S) Kansas State; Elite Eight	W 78–62	32–5	23 – Richardson	8 – Ingram	5 – Custer	Philips Arena (15,477); Atlanta, GA
Mar 31, 2018*; 5:09 pm, TBS	(11 S)	vs. (3 W) No. 7 Michigan; Final Four	L 57–69	32–6	17 – Krutwig	9 – Ingram	2 – Ingram	Alamodome (68,257); San Antonio, TX
*Non-conference game. ^{#}Rankings from AP Poll. (#) Tournament seedings in parentheses. S=South W=West. All times are in Central Time.

== Rankings ==
Ranking movements Legend: ██ Increase in ranking ██ Decrease in ranking — = Not ranked RV = Received votes
	Week																			
Poll	Pre	1	2	3	4	5	6	7	8	9	10	11	12	13	14	15	16	17	18	Final
AP	—	—	—	—	—	RV	—	—	—	—	—	—	—	—	—	RV	RV	RV	RV	Not released
Coaches	—	—	—	RV	—	RV	RV	—	—	—	—	—	—	RV	RV	RV	RV	RV	RV	7
