= 2018 NCAA Division I men's basketball tournament =

Edition of USA college basketball tournament

- Season: 2017–18
- Teams: 68
- Finals site: Alamodome, San Antonio, Texas
- Champions: Villanova Wildcats (3rd title, 4th title game, 6th Final Four)
- Runner-up: Michigan Wolverines (7th title game, 8th Final Four)
- Semifinalists: Kansas Jayhawks* (vacated) (15th Final Four); Loyola Ramblers (2nd Final Four)
- Winning coach: Jay Wright (2nd title)
- MOP: Donte DiVincenzo (Villanova)
- Top scorer: Malik Newman (Kansas) (108 points)

The 2018 NCAA Division I men's basketball tournament was a single-elimination tournament of 68 teams to determine the men's National Collegiate Athletic Association (NCAA) Division I college basketball national champion for the 2017–18 season. The 80th annual edition of the tournament began on March 13, 2018, and concluded with the championship game on April 2, at the Alamodome in San Antonio, Texas.

During the first round, UMBC became the first 16-seed to defeat a 1-seed in the men's tournament by defeating Virginia 74–54. For the first time in tournament history, all four top-seeded teams in a single region (the South) failed to make the Sweet 16. The tournament also featured the first regional final matchup of a 9-seed (Kansas State) and an 11-seed (Loyola–Chicago).

Villanova (returning after their 2016 national championship), Michigan (making their first appearance since their runner-up finish in 2013), Kansas (returning after their runner-up finish in 2012), and Loyola–Chicago (the "Cinderella team" of the tournament, and the fourth 11-seed to reach the Final Four, after VCU in 2011), all reached the Final Four. Villanova defeated Michigan in the championship game, 79–62.

The 2018 tournament was the first time since 1978 that none of the six Division I college basketball-playing schools based in the Washington, DC metropolitan area – American, Georgetown, George Mason, George Washington, Howard, and Maryland – made the NCAA tournament.

Atlantic Sun Conference champion Lipscomb made its NCAA tournament debut.

== Tournament procedure ==
A total of 68 teams entered the 2018 tournament. 32 automatic bids were awarded, one to each program that won their conference tournament. The remaining 36 bids were "at-large", with selections extended by the NCAA Selection Committee.

Eight teams (the four lowest-seeded automatic qualifiers and the four lowest-seeded at-large teams) played in the First Four (the successor to what had been popularly known as "play-in games" through the 2010 tournament). The winners of these games advanced to the main draw of the tournament.

The Selection Committee seeded the entire field from 1 to 68.

== Schedule and venues ==
2018 First Four (orange) and first and second rounds (green)
2018 Regionals (blue) and Final Four (red)

The following sites were selected to host each round of the 2018 tournament:

First Four

- March 13 and 14
  - University of Dayton Arena, Dayton, Ohio (Host: University of Dayton)

First and second rounds

- March 15 and 17
  - PPG Paints Arena, Pittsburgh, Pennsylvania (Host: Duquesne University)
  - Intrust Bank Arena, Wichita, Kansas (Host: Wichita State University)
  - American Airlines Center, Dallas, Texas (Host: Big 12 Conference)
  - ExtraMile Arena, Boise, Idaho (Host: Boise State University)
- March 16 and 18
  - Spectrum Center, Charlotte, North Carolina (Host: University of North Carolina at Charlotte)
  - Little Caesars Arena, Detroit, Michigan (Host: University of Detroit Mercy)
  - Bridgestone Arena, Nashville, Tennessee (Host: Ohio Valley Conference)
  - Viejas Arena, San Diego, California (Host: San Diego State University)

Regional semifinals and finals (Sweet Sixteen and Elite Eight)

- March 22 and 24
  - West Regional, Crypto.com Arena, Los Angeles, California (Host: Pepperdine University)
  - South Regional, State Farm Arena, Atlanta, Georgia (Host: Georgia Institute of Technology)
- March 23 and 25
  - East Regional, TD Garden, Boston, Massachusetts (Host: Boston College)
  - Midwest Regional, CHI Health Center Omaha, Omaha, Nebraska (Host: Creighton University)

National semifinals and championship (Final Four and championship)

- March 31 and April 2
  - Alamodome, San Antonio, Texas (Host: University of Texas at San Antonio)

The state of North Carolina was threatened with a 2018-2022 championship venue boycott by the NCAA, due to the HB2 law passed in 2016. However, the law was repealed (but with provisos) days before the NCAA met to make decisions on venues in April 2017. At that time, the NCAA board of governors "reluctantly voted to allow consideration of championship bids in North Carolina by our committees that are presently meeting". Therefore, Charlotte was eligible and served as a first weekend venue for the 2018 tournament.

== Qualification and selection ==
Four teams, out of 351 in Division I, were ineligible to participate in the 2018 tournament due to failing to meet APR requirements: Alabama A&M, Grambling State, Savannah State, and Southeast Missouri State. However, the NCAA granted the Savannah State Tigers a waiver which would have allowed the team to participate in the tournament, but the team failed to qualify.

=== Automatic qualifiers ===
The following 32 teams were automatic qualifiers for the 2018 NCAA field by virtue of winning their conference's automatic bid.

| Conference | Team | Record | Appearance | Last bid |
|---|---|---|---|---|
| America East | UMBC | 24–10 | 2nd | 2008 |
| American | Cincinnati | 30–4 | 32nd | 2017 |
| Atlantic 10 | Davidson | 21–11 | 14th | 2015 |
| ACC | Virginia | 31–2 | 22nd | 2017 |
| ASUN | Lipscomb | 23–9 | 1st | Never |
| Big 12 | Kansas | 27–7 | 47th | 2017 |
| Big East | Villanova | 30–4 | 38th | 2017 |
| Big Sky | Montana | 26–7 | 11th | 2013 |
| Big South | Radford | 22–12 | 3rd | 2009 |
| Big Ten | Michigan | 28–7 | 28th | 2017 |
| Big West | Cal State Fullerton | 20–11 | 3rd | 2008 |
| CAA | Charleston | 26–7 | 5th | 1999 |
| Conference USA | Marshall | 24–10 | 6th | 1987 |
| Horizon League | Wright State | 25–9 | 3rd | 2007 |
| Ivy League | Penn | 24–8 | 24th | 2007 |
| MAAC | Iona | 20–13 | 13th | 2017 |
| MAC | Buffalo | 26–8 | 3rd | 2016 |
| MEAC | North Carolina Central | 19–15 | 3rd | 2017 |
| Missouri Valley | Loyola–Chicago | 28–5 | 6th | 1985 |
| Mountain West | San Diego State | 22–10 | 12th | 2015 |
| Northeast | LIU Brooklyn | 18–16 | 7th | 2013 |
| Ohio Valley | Murray State | 26–5 | 16th | 2012 |
| Pac-12 | Arizona | 27–7 | 35th | 2017 |
| Patriot League | Bucknell | 25–9 | 8th | 2017 |
| SEC | Kentucky | 24–10 | 58th | 2017 |
| Southern | UNC Greensboro | 27–7 | 3rd | 2001 |
| Southland | Stephen F. Austin | 28–6 | 5th | 2016 |
| SWAC | Texas Southern | 15–19 | 8th | 2017 |
| Summit League | South Dakota State | 28–6 | 5th | 2017 |
| Sun Belt | Georgia State | 24–10 | 4th | 2015 |
| West Coast | Gonzaga | 30–4 | 21st | 2017 |
| WAC | New Mexico State | 28–5 | 24th | 2017 |

=== Tournament seeds ===
The tournament seeds were determined through the NCAA basketball tournament selection process. The seeds and regions were determined as follows:

South Regional, Philips Arena, Atlanta, Georgia
| Seed | School | Conference | Record | Overall Seed | Berth type | Last bid |
|---|---|---|---|---|---|---|
| 1 | Virginia | ACC | 31–2 | 1 | Auto | 2017 |
| 2 | Cincinnati | American | 30–4 | 8 | Auto | 2017 |
| 3 | Tennessee | SEC | 25–8 | 10 | At-large | 2014 |
| 4 | Arizona | Pac-12 | 27–7 | 16 | Auto | 2017 |
| 5 | Kentucky | SEC | 24–10 | 17 | Auto | 2017 |
| 6 | Miami (FL) | ACC | 22–9 | 22 | At-large | 2017 |
| 7 | Nevada | Mountain West | 27–7 | 27 | At-large | 2017 |
| 8 | Creighton | Big East | 21–11 | 30 | At-large | 2017 |
| 9 | Kansas State | Big 12 | 22–11 | 34 | At-large | 2017 |
| 10 | Texas | Big 12 | 19–14 | 39 | At-large | 2016 |
| 11 | Loyola–Chicago | Missouri Valley | 28–5 | 46 | Auto | 1985 |
| 12 | Davidson | Atlantic 10 | 21–11 | 48 | Auto | 2015 |
| 13 | Buffalo | MAC | 26–8 | 51 | Auto | 2016 |
| 14 | Wright State | Horizon | 25–9 | 57 | Auto | 2007 |
| 15 | Georgia State | Sun Belt | 24–10 | 60 | Auto | 2015 |
| 16 | UMBC | America East | 24–10 | 63 | Auto | 2008 |

East Regional, TD Garden, Boston, Massachusetts
| Seed | School | Conference | Record | Overall Seed | Berth type | Last bid |
|---|---|---|---|---|---|---|
| 1 | Villanova | Big East | 30–4 | 2 | Auto | 2017 |
| 2 | Purdue | Big Ten | 28–6 | 7 | At-large | 2017 |
| 3 | Texas Tech | Big 12 | 24–9 | 12 | At-large | 2016 |
| 4 | Wichita State | American | 25–7 | 14 | At-large | 2017 |
| 5 | West Virginia | Big 12 | 24–10 | 18 | At-large | 2017 |
| 6 | Florida | SEC | 20–12 | 21 | At-large | 2017 |
| 7 | Arkansas | SEC | 23–11 | 26 | At-large | 2017 |
| 8 | Virginia Tech | ACC | 21–11 | 31 | At-large | 2017 |
| 9 | Alabama | SEC | 19–15 | 36 | At-large | 2012 |
| 10 | Butler | Big East | 20–13 | 33 | At-large | 2017 |
| 11* | St. Bonaventure | Atlantic 10 | 25–7 | 42 | At-large | 2012 |
| 11* | UCLA | Pac-12 | 21–11 | 41 | At-large | 2017 |
| 12 | Murray State | Ohio Valley | 26–5 | 50 | Auto | 2012 |
| 13 | Marshall | Conference USA | 24–10 | 54 | Auto | 1987 |
| 14 | Stephen F. Austin | Southland | 28–6 | 58 | Auto | 2016 |
| 15 | Cal State Fullerton | Big West | 20–11 | 61 | Auto | 2008 |
| 16* | LIU Brooklyn | NEC | 18–16 | 66 | Auto | 2013 |
| 16* | Radford | Big South | 22–12 | 65 | Auto | 2009 |

West Regional, Staples Center, Los Angeles, California
| Seed | School | Conference | Record | Overall Seed | Berth type | Last bid |
|---|---|---|---|---|---|---|
| 1 | Xavier | Big East | 28–5 | 4 | At-large | 2017 |
| 2 | North Carolina | ACC | 25–10 | 5 | At-large | 2017 |
| 3 | Michigan | Big Ten | 28–7 | 11 | Auto | 2017 |
| 4 | Gonzaga | WCC | 30–4 | 15 | Auto | 2017 |
| 5 | Ohio State | Big Ten | 24–8 | 20 | At-large | 2015 |
| 6 | Houston | American | 26–7 | 23 | At-large | 2010 |
| 7 | Texas A&M | SEC | 20–12 | 25 | At-large | 2016 |
| 8 | Missouri | SEC | 20–12 | 32 | At-large | 2013 |
| 9 | Florida State | ACC | 20–11 | 38 | At-large | 2017 |
| 10 | Providence | Big East | 21–13 | 35 | At-large | 2017 |
| 11 | San Diego State | Mountain West | 22–10 | 45 | Auto | 2015 |
| 12 | South Dakota State | Summit League | 28–6 | 49 | Auto | 2017 |
| 13 | UNC Greensboro | Southern | 27–7 | 52 | Auto | 2001 |
| 14 | Montana | Big Sky | 26–7 | 56 | Auto | 2013 |
| 15 | Lipscomb | Atlantic Sun | 23–9 | 59 | Auto | Never |
| 16* | North Carolina Central | MEAC | 19–15 | 67 | Auto | 2017 |
| 16* | Texas Southern | SWAC | 15–19 | 68 | Auto | 2017 |

Midwest Regional, CenturyLink Center Omaha, Omaha, Nebraska
| Seed | School | Conference | Record | Overall Seed | Berth type | Last bid |
|---|---|---|---|---|---|---|
| 1 | Kansas | Big 12 | 27–7 | 3 | Auto | 2017 |
| 2 | Duke | ACC | 26–7 | 6 | At-large | 2017 |
| 3 | Michigan State | Big Ten | 29–4 | 9 | At-large | 2017 |
| 4 | Auburn | SEC | 25–7 | 13 | At-large | 2003 |
| 5 | Clemson | ACC | 23–9 | 19 | At-large | 2011 |
| 6 | TCU | Big 12 | 21–11 | 24 | At-large | 1998 |
| 7 | Rhode Island | Atlantic 10 | 25–7 | 28 | At-large | 2017 |
| 8 | Seton Hall | Big East | 21–11 | 29 | At-large | 2017 |
| 9 | NC State | ACC | 21–11 | 37 | At-large | 2015 |
| 10 | Oklahoma | Big 12 | 18–13 | 40 | At-large | 2016 |
| 11* | Arizona State | Pac-12 | 20–11 | 43 | At-large | 2014 |
| 11* | Syracuse | ACC | 20–13 | 44 | At-large | 2016 |
| 12 | New Mexico State | WAC | 28–5 | 47 | Auto | 2017 |
| 13 | Charleston | CAA | 26–7 | 53 | Auto | 1999 |
| 14 | Bucknell | Patriot | 25–9 | 55 | Auto | 2017 |
| 15 | Iona | MAAC | 20–13 | 62 | Auto | 2017 |
| 16 | Penn | Ivy League | 24–8 | 64 | Auto | 2007 |

*See First Four

== Regional brackets ==
All times are listed as Eastern Daylight Time (UTC−4)

=== First Four – Dayton, Ohio ===
The First Four games involved eight teams: the four overall lowest-ranked teams, and the four lowest-ranked at-large teams.

| March 13 – East Region |
| 16 | LIU Brooklyn | 61 |
| 16 | Radford | 71 |

| March 13 – East Region |
| 11 | St. Bonaventure | 65 |
| 11 | UCLA | 58 |

| March 14 – West Region |
| 16 | Texas Southern | 64 |
| 16 | North Carolina Central | 46 |

| March 14 – Midwest Region |
| 11 | Syracuse | 60 |
| 11 | Arizona State | 56 |

=== South Regional – Atlanta, Georgia ===
First round Round of 64; March 15–16
1 | Virginia | 54
16 | UMBC | 74
Charlotte – Fri/Sun
8 | Creighton | 59
9 | Kansas State | 69
5 | Kentucky | 78
12 | Davidson | 73
Boise – Thu/Sat
4 | Arizona | 68
13 | Buffalo | 89
6 | Miami (FL) | 62
11 | Loyola–Chicago | 64
Dallas – Thu/Sat
3 | Tennessee | 73
14 | Wright State | 47
7 | Nevada | 87^{OT}
10 | Texas | 83
Nashville – Fri/Sun
2 | Cincinnati | 68
15 | Georgia State | 53

Second round Round of 32; March 17–18
16 | UMBC | 43
9 | Kansas State | 50
5 | Kentucky | 95
13 | Buffalo | 75
11 | Loyola–Chicago | 63
3 | Tennessee | 62
7 | Nevada | 75
2 | Cincinnati | 73

Regional semifinals Sweet 16; March 22
9 | Kansas State | 61
5 | Kentucky | 58
11 | Loyola–Chicago | 69
7 | Nevada | 68

Regional final Elite 8 March 24
9 | Kansas State | 62
11 | Loyola–Chicago | 78

==== South Regional Final ====
TBS

March 24
6:09 pm EDT

Box score

#11 Loyola–Chicago Ramblers 78, #9 Kansas State Wildcats 62
Scoring by half: 36–24, 42–38
| Pts: B. Richardson – 23; Rebs: D. Ingram – 8 Asts: C. Custer – 5 | Pts: X. Sneed – 16; Rebs: X. Sneed – 6 Asts: K. Stokes – 4 |

Philips Arena – Atlanta, GA
Attendance: 15,477
Referees: Gerry Pollard, Terry Wymer, Bert Smith

==== South Regional all tournament team ====
- Ben Richardson (Sr, Loyola–Chicago) – South Regional most outstanding player
- Clayton Custer (Jr, Loyola–Chicago)
- Donte Ingram (Sr, Loyola–Chicago)
- Xavier Sneed (So, Kansas State)
- Barry Brown Jr. (Jr, Kansas State)

=== West Regional – Los Angeles, California ===
First round Round of 64; March 15–16
1 | Xavier | 102
16 | Texas Southern | 83
Nashville – Fri/Sun
8 | Missouri | 54
9 | Florida State | 67
5 | Ohio State | 81
12 | South Dakota State | 73
Boise – Thu/Sat
4 | Gonzaga | 68
13 | UNC Greensboro | 64
6 | Houston | 67
11 | San Diego State | 65
Wichita – Thu/Sat
3 | Michigan | 61
14 | Montana | 47
7 | Texas A&M | 73
10 | Providence | 69
Charlotte – Fri/Sun
2 | North Carolina | 84
15 | Lipscomb | 66

Second round Round of 32; March 17–18
1 | Xavier | 70
9 | Florida State | 75
5 | Ohio State | 84
4 | Gonzaga | 90
6 | Houston | 63
3 | Michigan | 64
7 | Texas A&M | 86
2 | North Carolina | 65

Regional semifinals Sweet 16; March 22
9 | Florida State | 75
4 | Gonzaga | 60
3 | Michigan | 99
7 | Texas A&M | 72

Regional final Elite 8 March 24
9 | Florida State | 54
3 | Michigan | 58

==== West Regional Final ====
TBS

March 24
5:49 pm PDT

Box score

#9 Florida State Seminoles 54, #3 Michigan Wolverines 58
Scoring by half: 26–27, 28–31
| Pts: P. Cofer - 16; Rebs: P. Cofer - 11; Asts: B. Angola, T. Mann, T. Forrest - 2 | Pts: C. Matthews – 17; Rebs: C. Matthews – 8 Asts: Z. Simpson – 5 |

Staples Center – Los Angeles, CA
Attendance: 19,665
Referees: Randy McCall, Keith Kimble, John Gaffney

==== West Regional all tournament team ====
- Charles Matthews (So, Michigan) – West Regional most outstanding player
- Moritz Wagner (Jr, Michigan)
- Muhammad-Ali Abdur-Rahkman (Sr, Michigan)
- Phil Cofer (Sr, Florida State)
- Terance Mann (Jr, Florida State)

=== East Regional – Boston, Massachusetts ===
First round Round of 64; March 15–16
1 | Villanova | 87
16 | Radford | 61
Pittsburgh – Thu/Sat
8 | Virginia Tech | 83
9 | Alabama | 86
5 | West Virginia | 85
12 | Murray State | 68
San Diego – Fri/Sun
4 | Wichita State | 75
13 | Marshall | 81
6 | Florida | 77
11 | St. Bonaventure | 62
Dallas – Thu/Sat
3 | Texas Tech | 70
14 | Stephen F. Austin | 60
7 | Arkansas | 62
10 | Butler | 79
Detroit – Fri/Sun
2 | Purdue | 74
15 | Cal State Fullerton | 48

Second round Round of 32; March 17–18
1 | Villanova | 81
9 | Alabama | 58
5 | West Virginia | 94
13 | Marshall | 71
6 | Florida | 66
3 | Texas Tech | 69
10 | Butler | 73
2 | Purdue | 76

Regional semifinals Sweet 16; March 23
1 | Villanova | 90
5 | West Virginia | 78
3 | Texas Tech | 78
2 | Purdue | 65

Regional final Elite 8 March 25
1 | Villanova | 71
3 | Texas Tech | 59

==== East Regional Final ====
CBS

March 25
2:20 pm EDT

Box score

#3 Texas Tech Red Raiders 59, #1 Villanova Wildcats 71
Scoring by half: 23–36, 36–35
| Pts: K. Evans – 12; Rebs: J. Gray – 9 Asts: K. Evans - 4 | Pts: J. Brunson – 15; Rebs: E. Paschall – 14; Asts: J. Brunson – 4 |

TD Garden – Boston, MA
Attendance: 19,169
Referees: Terry Oglesby, Mike Reed, Michael Stephens

==== East Regional all tournament team ====
- Jalen Brunson (Jr, Villanova) – East Regional most outstanding player
- Omari Spellman (Fr, Villanova)
- Eric Paschall (Jr, Villanova)
- Carsen Edwards (So, Purdue)
- Keenan Evans (Sr, Texas Tech)

=== Midwest Regional – Omaha, Nebraska ===
First round Round of 64; March 15–16
1 | Kansas | 76
16 | Penn | 60
Wichita – Thu/Sat
8 | Seton Hall | 94
9 | NC State | 83
5 | Clemson | 79
12 | New Mexico State | 68
San Diego – Fri/Sun
4 | Auburn | 62
13 | Charleston | 58
6 | TCU | 52
11 | Syracuse | 57
Detroit – Fri/Sun
3 | Michigan State | 82
14 | Bucknell | 78
7 | Rhode Island | 83^{OT}
10 | Oklahoma | 78
Pittsburgh – Thu/Sat
2 | Duke | 89
15 | Iona | 67

Second round Round of 32; March 17–18
1 | Kansas | 83
8 | Seton Hall | 79
5 | Clemson | 84
4 | Auburn | 53
11 | Syracuse | 55
3 | Michigan State | 53
7 | Rhode Island | 62
2 | Duke | 87

Regional semifinals Sweet 16; March 23
1 | Kansas | 80
5 | Clemson | 76
11 | Syracuse | 65
2 | Duke | 69

Regional final Elite 8 March 25
1 | Kansas | 85^{OT}
2 | Duke | 81

==== Midwest Regional Final ====
CBS

March 25
4:05 pm CDT

Box score

#2 Duke Blue Devils 81, #1 Kansas Jayhawks 85 (OT)
Scoring by half: 36–33, 36–39 Overtime: 9–13
| Pts: T. Duval – 20; Rebs: M. Bagley III – 10; Asts: T. Duval – 6 | Pts: M. Newman – 32; Rebs: S. Mykhailiuk, S. De Sousa – 10; Asts: D. Graham - 6 |

CenturyLink Center Omaha – Omaha, NE
Attendance: 17,579
Referees: Roger Ayers, Doug Sirmons, Jeffrey Anderson

==== Midwest Regional all tournament team ====
- Malik Newman (So, Kansas) – Midwest Regional most outstanding player
- Trevon Duval (Fr, Duke)
- Gabe DeVoe (Sr, Clemson)
- Marvin Bagley III (Fr, Duke)
- Devonte' Graham (Sr, Kansas)
- Gary Trent Jr. (Fr, Duke)

== Final Four ==
During the Final Four round, regardless of the seeds of the participating teams, the champion of the top overall top seed's region (Loyola-Chicago's South Region) plays against the champion of the fourth-ranked top seed's region (Michigan's West Region), and the champion of the second overall top seed's region (Villanova's East Region) plays against the champion of the third-ranked top seed's region (Kansas' Midwest Region).

=== Alamodome – San Antonio, Texas ===
National Semifinals; Final Four; Saturday, March 31
S11 | Loyola–Chicago | 57
W3 | Michigan | 69
E1 | Villanova | 95
MW1 | ~~Kansas~~ | 79

National Championship Game; Monday, April 2
W3 | Michigan | 62
E1 | Villanova | 79

Kansas vacated 15 wins, including all NCAA tournament wins from the 2017–18 season after an investigation into the eligibility of Silvio De Sousa. Unlike forfeiture, a vacated game does not result in the other school being credited with a win, only with Kansas removing the wins from its own record.

==== National semifinals ====
TBS

March 31
5:09 pm CDT

Box score

#S11 Loyola–Chicago Ramblers 57, #W3 Michigan Wolverines 69
Scoring by half: 29–22, 28–47
| Pts: Cameron Krutwig – 17; Rebs: Donte Ingram – 9 Asts: Donte Ingram – 2 | Pts: Moritz Wagner – 24; Rebs: Moritz Wagner – 15; Asts: Zavier Simpson – 3 |

Alamodome, San Antonio, Texas
Attendance: 68,257
Referees: Roger Ayers, Mike Roberts, Terry Oglesby

TBS

March 31
7:49 pm CDT

Box score

#MW1 ~~Kansas Jayhawks~~ 79, #E1 Villanova Wildcats 95
Scoring by half: 32–47, 47–48
| Pts: Devonte' Graham – 23; Rebs: Malik Newman – 8 Asts: Devonte' Graham, Sviatoslav Mykhailiuk – 3 | Pts: Eric Paschall – 24; Rebs: Omari Spellman – 13; Asts: Phil Booth, Jalen Brunson – 6 |

Alamodome, San Antonio, Texas
Attendance: 68,257
Referees: Randy McCall, Michael Stephens, Kipp Kissinger

==== National Championship ====
TBS

April 2
8:20 pm CDT

Box score

#W3 Michigan Wolverines 62, #E1 Villanova Wildcats 79
Scoring by half: 28–37, 34–42
| Pts: M. Abdur-Rahkman – 23; Rebs: Moritz Wagner – 7 Asts: Zavier Simpson – 2 | Pts: D. DiVincenzo – 31; Rebs: Omari Spellman – 11; Asts: D. DiVincenzo – 3 |

Alamodome, San Antonio, Texas
Attendance: 67,831
Referees: Doug Sirmons, Terry Wymer, Jeffrey Anderson

==== Final Four all-tournament team ====
- Donte DiVincenzo (So, Villanova) – Final Four Most Outstanding Player
- Mikal Bridges (Jr, Villanova)
- Jalen Brunson (Jr, Villanova)
- Eric Paschall (Jr, Villanova)
- Moritz Wagner (Jr, Michigan)

== Game summaries and tournament notes ==
=== Upsets ===
Per the NCAA, "Upsets are defined as when the winner of the game was seeded five or more places lower than the team it defeated."

The 2018 tournament saw a total of 11 upsets, with five in the first round, five in the second round, and one in the Sweet Sixteen.

Upsets in the 2018 NCAA Division I men's basketball tournament
| Round | South | West | East | Midwest |
|---|---|---|---|---|
| Round of 64 | No. 16 UMBC defeated No. 1 Virginia, 74–54; No. 13 Buffalo defeated No. 4 Arizona, 89–68; No. 11 Loyola Chicago defeated No. 6 Miami (FL), 64–62 | None | No. 13 Marshall defeated No. 4 Wichita State, 81–75 | No. 11 Syracuse defeated No. 6 TCU, 57–52 |
| Round of 32 | No. 11 Loyola Chicago defeated No. 3 Tennessee, 63–62; No. 7 Nevada defeated No. 2 Cincinnati, 75–73 | No. 9 Florida State defeated No. 1 Xavier, 75–70; No. 7 Texas A&M defeated No. 2 North Carolina, 86–65 | None | No. 11 Syracuse defeated No. 3 Michigan State, 55–53 |
| Sweet 16 | None | No. 9 Florida State defeated No. 4 Gonzaga, 75–60 | None | |
| Elite 8 | None | | | |
| Final 4 | None | | | |
| National Championship | None | | | |

== Record by conference ==
| Conference | Bids | Record | Win % | R64 | R32 | S16 | E8 | F4 | CG | NC |
|---|---|---|---|---|---|---|---|---|---|---|
| Big East | 6 | 9–5 | .643 | 6 | 4 | 1 | 1 | 1 | 1 | 1 |
| Big Ten | 4 | 9–4 | .692 | 4 | 4 | 2 | 1 | 1 | 1 | – |
| Big 12 | 7 | 12–7 | .632 | 7 | 4 | 4 | 3 | 1 | – | – |
| Missouri Valley | 1 | 4–1 | .800 | 1 | 1 | 1 | 1 | 1 | – | – |
| ACC | 9 | 12–9 | .571 | 9 | 5 | 4 | 2 | – | – | – |
| WCC | 1 | 2–1 | .667 | 1 | 1 | 1 | – | – | – | – |
| SEC | 8 | 8–8 | .500 | 8 | 6 | 2 | – | – | – | – |
| Mountain West | 2 | 2–2 | .500 | 2 | 1 | 1 | – | – | – | – |
| American | 3 | 2–3 | .400 | 3 | 2 | – | – | – | – | – |
| Atlantic 10 | 3 | 2–3 | .400 | 3 | 1 | – | – | – | – | – |
| America East | 1 | 1–1 | .500 | 1 | 1 | – | – | – | – | – |
| C-USA | 1 | 1–1 | .500 | 1 | 1 | – | – | – | – | – |
| MAC | 1 | 1–1 | .500 | 1 | 1 | – | – | – | – | – |
| Big South | 1 | 1–1 | .500 | 1 | – | – | – | – | – | – |
| SWAC | 1 | 1–1 | .500 | 1 | – | – | – | – | – | – |
| Pac-12 | 3 | 0–3 | .000 | 1 | – | – | – | – | – | – |

- The R64, R32, S16, E8, F4, CG, and NC columns indicate how many teams from each conference were in the round of 64 (first round), round of 32 (second round), Sweet 16, Elite Eight, Final Four, championship game, and national champion, respectively.
- The "Record" column includes wins in the First Four for the ACC, Atlantic 10, Big South, and SWAC conferences and two losses in the First Four for the Pac-12 conference.
- The MEAC and NEC conferences each had one representative, eliminated in the First Four with a record of 0–1.
- The Atlantic Sun, Big Sky, Big West, CAA, Horizon, Ivy League, MAAC, Ohio Valley, Patriot, Southern, Southland, Summit, Sun Belt and WAC conferences each had one representative, eliminated in the first round with a record of 0–1.

The Pac-12 lost all of its teams after the first day of the main tournament draw, marking the first time since the Big 12 began play in 1996 that one of the six major conferences—defined as the ACC, Big Ten, Big 12, Pac-12, SEC, and both versions of the Big East—failed to have a team advance to the tournament's round of 32.

== Media coverage ==
=== Television ===
CBS Sports and Turner Sports had U.S. television rights to the Tournament under the NCAA March Madness brand. As part of a cycle beginning in 2016, TBS held the rights to the Final Four and to the championship game.

For the first time, TBS held the rights to the Selection Show, which expanded into a two-hour format, was presented in front of a studio audience, and promoted that the entire field of the tournament would be unveiled within the first ten minutes of the broadcast. However, this entailed the 68-team field (beginning with automatic qualifiers, followed by at-large teams) being revealed in alphabetical order, and not by bracket matchups (which was done later in the show). The new format was criticized for lacking suspense, and the show also faced criticism for technical issues, as well as a segment containing product placement for Pizza Hut.

==== Television channels ====
- First Four – TruTV
- First and second rounds – CBS, TBS, TNT, and TruTV
- Regional semifinals and Finals (Sweet Sixteen and Elite Eight) – CBS and TBS
- National semifinals (Final Four) and championship – TBS

==== Studio hosts ====
- Greg Gumbel (New York City and San Antonio) – first round, second round, regionals, Final Four and national championship game
- Ernie Johnson Jr. (New York City, Atlanta, and San Antonio) – first round, second round, regional semi-finals, Final Four and national championship game
- Casey Stern (Atlanta) – First Four, first round and second round
- Adam Zucker (New York) – first round and second round (game breaks)

==== Studio analysts ====
- Charles Barkley (New York City and San Antonio) – first round, second round, regionals, Final Four and national championship game
- Seth Davis (Atlanta and San Antonio) – First Four, first round, second round, regional semi-finals, Final Four and national championship game
- Brendan Haywood (Atlanta and San Antonio) – First Four, first round, second round, regional semi-finals and Final Four
- Clark Kellogg (New York City and San Antonio) – first round, second round, regionals, Final Four and national championship game
- Gregg Marshall (Atlanta) – regional semi-finals
- Frank Martin (Atlanta) – second round
- Candace Parker (Atlanta and San Antonio) – First Four, first round, second round, regional semi-finals and Final Four
- Kenny Smith (New York City and San Antonio) – first round, second round, regionals, Final Four and national championship game
- Wally Szczerbiak (New York City) – second round
- Brad Underwood (Atlanta) – first round
- Christian Laettner (San Antonio) – Final Four
- Danny Manning (San Antonio) – Final Four
- Kris Jenkins (San Antonio) – Final Four

==== Commentary teams ====
- Jim Nantz/Bill Raftery/Grant Hill/Tracy Wolfson – first and second rounds at Charlotte, North Carolina; Midwest Regional at Omaha, Nebraska; Final Four and National Championship at San Antonio, Texas
- Brian Anderson/Chris Webber/Lisa Byington – first and second rounds at Boise, Idaho; South Regional at Atlanta, Georgia
- Ian Eagle/Jim Spanarkel/Allie LaForce – First Four at Dayton, Ohio (Wednesday); first and second rounds at Detroit, Michigan; East Regional at Boston, Massachusetts
- Kevin Harlan/Reggie Miller/Dan Bonner/Dana Jacobson – first and second rounds at Pittsburgh, Pennsylvania; West Regional at Los Angeles, California
- Brad Nessler/Steve Lavin/Evan Washburn – first and second rounds at Wichita, Kansas
- Spero Dedes/Steve Smith/Len Elmore/Rosalyn Gold-Onwude – First Four at Dayton, Ohio (Tuesday); first and second rounds at Dallas, Texas
- Andrew Catalon/Steve Lappas/Jamie Erdahl – first and second rounds at Nashville, Tennessee
- Carter Blackburn/Debbie Antonelli/John Schriffen – first and second rounds at San Diego, California

===== Team Stream broadcasts =====
Final Four

- Matt Park/Jay Feely/Dr. Sanjay Gupta – Michigan Team Stream on TNT
- Jeff Hagedorn/Jerry Harkness/Shams Charania – Loyola–Chicago Team Stream on truTV
- Dave Armstrong/Scot Pollard/Rob Riggle– Kansas Team Stream on TNT
- Scott Graham/Randy Foye/Kacie McDonnell – Villanova Team Stream on truTV

National championship game

- Matt Park/Jay Feely/Dr. Sanjay Gupta – Michigan Team Stream on TNT
- Scott Graham/Randy Foye/Kacie McDonnell – Villanova Team Stream on truTV

=== Radio ===
Westwood One had exclusive radio rights to the entire tournament.

==== First Four ====
- Ted Emrich and Austin Croshere – at Dayton, Ohio

==== First and second rounds ====
- Scott Graham and Kelly Tripucka – Pittsburgh, Pennsylvania
- Brandon Gaudin and Donny Marshall – Wichita, Kansas
- Ryan Radtke and Jim Jackson – Dallas, Texas
- Jason Benetti and Dan Dickau – Boise, Idaho
- Kevin Kugler and Eric Montross/John Thompson – Charlotte, North Carolina (Montross – Friday night; Thompson – Friday Afternoon & Sunday)
- Chris Carrino and P. J. Carlesimo – Detroit, Michigan
- Ted Emrich – Friday Afternoon/Craig Way – Friday Night & Sunday and Will Perdue – Nashville, Tennessee
- John Sadak and Mike Montgomery – San Diego, California

==== Regionals ====
- Gary Cohen and P. J. Carlesimo – East Regional at Boston, Massachusetts
- Kevin Kugler and Donny Marshall – Midwest Regional at Omaha, Nebraska
- Brandon Gaudin and John Thompson – South Regional at Atlanta, Georgia
- Tom McCarthy and Jim Jackson – West Regional at Los Angeles, California

==== Final Four ====
- Kevin Kugler, John Thompson, Clark Kellogg, and Jim Gray – San Antonio, Texas

=== Internet ===
==== Video ====
Live video of games was available for streaming through the following means:

- NCAA March Madness Live (website and app, no CBS games on digital media players; access to games on Turner channels requires TV Everywhere authentication through provider; 3 hour preview for Turner games is provided before authentication is required)
- CBS All Access (only CBS games, service subscription required)
- CBS Sports website and app (only CBS games)
- Bleacher Report website and Team Stream app (only Turner games, access requires subscription)
- Watch TBS website and app (only TBS games, requires TV Everywhere authentication)
- Watch TNT website and app (only TNT games, requires TV Everywhere authentication)
- Watch truTV website and app (only truTV games, requires TV Everywhere authentication)
- Websites and apps of cable, satellite, and OTT providers of CBS & Turner (access requires subscription)

==== Audio ====
Live audio of games was available for streaming through the following means:

- NCAA March Madness Live (website and app)
- Westwood One Sports website
- TuneIn (website and app)
- Websites and apps of Westwood One Sports affiliates

== See also ==
- 2018 NCAA Division II men's basketball tournament
- 2018 NCAA Division III men's basketball tournament
- 2018 NAIA Division I men's basketball tournament
- 2018 U Sports Men's Basketball Championship
- 2018 UMBC vs. Virginia men's basketball game
