= Aher Uguak =

Canadian basketball player (born 1998)

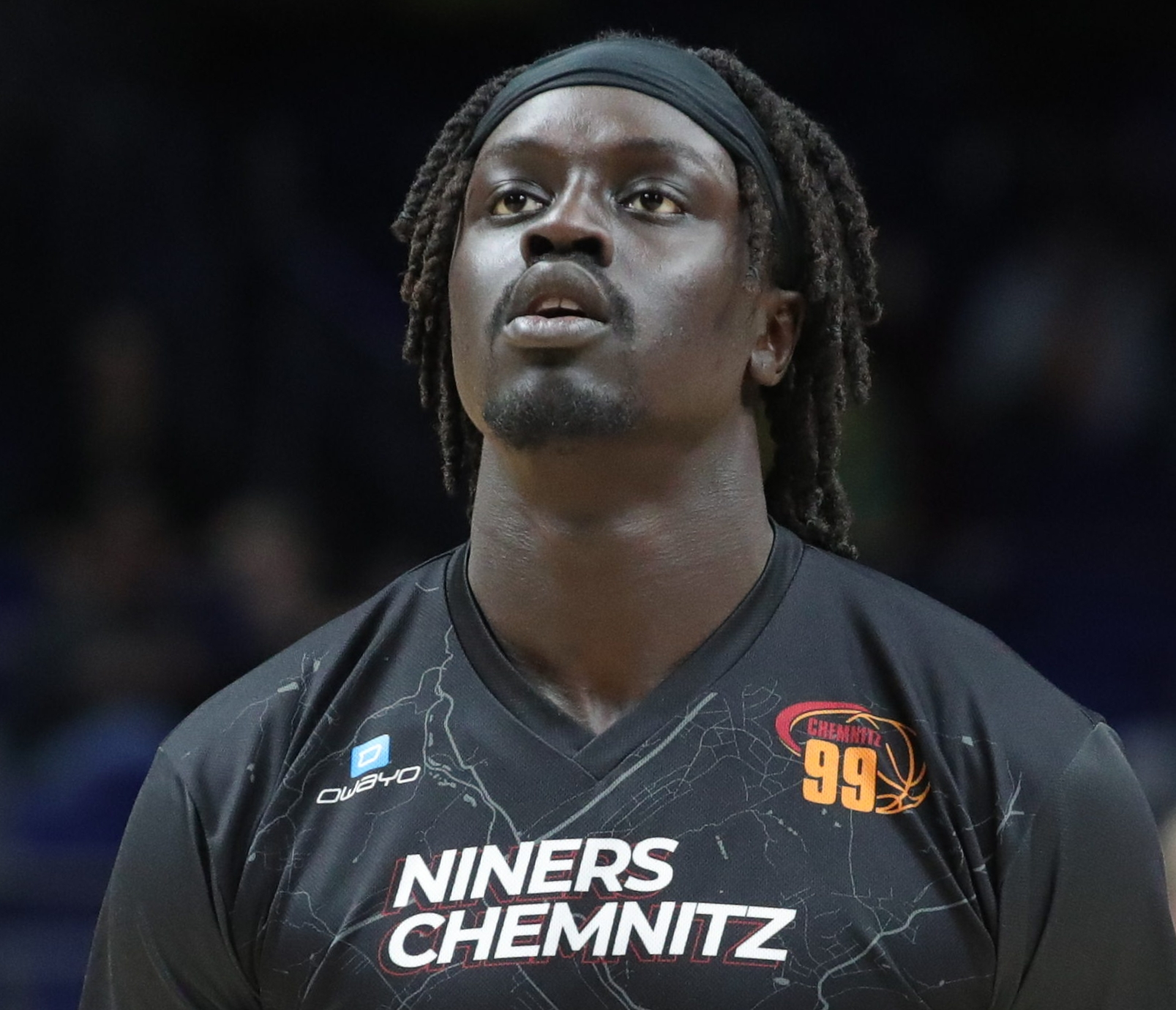
- Uguak in 2023

No. 3 – Élan Chalon
- Position: Small forward
- League: LNB Élite

Personal information
- Born: May 24, 1998 (age 28) Ismailia, Egypt
- Listed height: 6 ft 7 in (2.01 m)
- Listed weight: 225 lb (102 kg)

Career information
- High school: Harry Ainlay (Edmonton, Alberta)
- College: New Mexico (2016–2017); Loyola Chicago (2018–2022)
- NBA draft: 2022: undrafted
- Playing career: 2022–present

Career history
- 2022–2023: Chemnitz 99
- 2023: Edmonton Stingers
- 2023–2026: Chemnitz 99
- 2026–present: Élan Chalon

Career highlights
- FIBA Europe Cup champion (2024); Third-team All-MVC (2021); 2× MVC All-Defensive Team (2021, 2022)

Aher Simon Uguak (born May 24, 1998) is a Canadian professional basketball player for Élan Chalon of the LNB Élite. He played college basketball for New Mexico and Loyola Chicago.

== Early life and high school career ==
Uguak was born in Egypt after his family had fled their native Sudan to escape civil war. When he was eight months old, his family settled in Canada. Uguak started out playing Gridiron football but switched to basketball at age 7, inspired by the achievements of his cousin Luol Deng. He attended Harry Ainlay High School in Edmonton, Alberta. Uguak led his team to back-to-back provincial titles. He committed to playing college basketball for New Mexico. He was the highest rated prospect in his class from Alberta.

== College career ==
As a freshman at New Mexico, Uguak averaged 1.2 points per game before leaving the program. For his sophomore season, he transferred to Loyola (Illinois) and sat out for one year due to transfer rules. As a sophomore, Uguak was a regular starter, averaging 5.8 points and 3.5 rebounds per game. He averaged 5.7 points and 3.9 rebounds per game as a junior. Uguak improved offensively during his senior season. On January 2, 2021, he recorded a career-high 26 points and seven rebounds in a 57–49 win over North Texas. Uguak was named to the Third Team All-Missouri Valley Conference (MVC) and the MVC All-Defensive Team. As a senior, he averaged 7.3 points and 3.9 rebounds per game, shooting 61.9 percent from the field. Following the season, Uguak took advantage of the extra season of eligibility granted by the NCAA due to the COVID-19 pandemic. He was named to the MVC All-Defensive Team.

== Professional career ==
On July 25, 2022, Uguak signed with Chemnitz 99 of the Basketball Bundesliga (BBL).

On March 2, 2023, Uguak signed with Edmonton Stingers of the Canadian Elite Basketball League (CEBL).

On July 30, 2026, he signed with Élan Chalon of the LNB Pro A.

== Career statistics ==
Legend
GP	Games played	GS	Games started	MPG	Minutes per game
FG%	Field goal percentage	3P%	3-point field goal percentage	FT%	Free throw percentage
RPG	Rebounds per game	APG	Assists per game	SPG	Steals per game
BPG	Blocks per game	PPG	Points per game	**Bold**	Career high

=== College ===
Year	Team	GP	GS	MPG	FG%	3P%	FT%	RPG	APG	SPG	BPG	PPG
2016–17	New Mexico	19	2	7.4	.350	.125	.533	.7	.4	.3	.1	1.2
2017–18	Loyola	Redshirt										
2018–19	Loyola	**34**	28	**25.1**	.504	.200	.687	3.5	1.0	**.9**	**.2**	5.8
2019–20	Loyola	32	**31**	24.0	.517	.158	.628	**3.9**	**1.9**	.5	.1	5.7
2020–21	Loyola	31	**31**	24.5	**.619**	**.333**	**.764**	**3.9**	1.2	**.9**	.0	**7.3**
Career		116	92	21.7	.539	.238	.674	3.3	1.2	.7	.1	5.4

== Personal life ==
Uguak's younger brother, Lwal, plays in the CFL as a defensive lineman for the Montreal Alouettes. His cousin, Luol Deng, played in the National Basketball Association.
