= 2017–18 Cincinnati Bearcats men's basketball team =

American college basketball season

2017–18 Cincinnati Bearcats men's basketball

AAC regular season and tournament champions Cayman Islands Classic champions

NCAA tournament, Second Round
- Conference: American Athletic Conference

Ranking
- Coaches: No. 12
- AP: No. 6
- Record: 31–5 (16–2 AAC)
- Head coach: Mick Cronin (12th season)
- Assistant coaches: Larry Davis (12th season); Antwon Jackson (6th season); Darren Savino (8th season)
- Home arena: BB&T Arena

2017–18 American Athletic Conference men's basketball standings
	Conf.				Overall
Team	W		L	PCT	W		L	PCT
No. 6 Cincinnati †	16	–	2	.889	31	–	5	.861
No. 16 Wichita State	14	–	4	.778	25	–	8	.758
No. 21 Houston	14	–	4	.778	27	–	8	.771
Tulsa	12	–	6	.667	19	–	12	.613
Memphis	10	–	8	.556	21	–	13	.618
UCF	9	–	9	.500	19	–	13	.594
Temple	8	–	10	.444	17	–	16	.515
UConn	7	–	11	.389	14	–	18	.438
SMU	6	–	12	.333	17	–	16	.515
Tulane	5	–	13	.278	14	–	17	.452
East Carolina	4	–	14	.222	10	–	20	.333
South Florida	3	–	15	.167	10	–	22	.313
† 2018 AAC tournament winner Rankings from AP poll

The 2017–18 Cincinnati Bearcats men's basketball team represented the University of Cincinnati in the 2017–18 NCAA Division I men's basketball season. The team played its home games at the BB&T Arena on the campus of Northern Kentucky University in Highland Heights, Kentucky due to renovations at their home arena, Fifth Third Arena. The Bearcats were led by 12th-year head coach Mick Cronin and are members of the American Athletic Conference. They finished the season 31–5, 16–2 in AAC play to win the regular season championship. They defeated SMU, Memphis, and Houston to win the AAC tournament and received the conference's automatic bid to the NCAA tournament. As the No. 2 seed in the South region, they defeated Georgia State in the First Round before being upset by Nevada in the Second Round. In their loss to Nevada, they were up 22 before losing 75–73, tying the second largest comeback in NCAA Tournament history.

== Previous season ==
The Bearcats finished the 2016–17 season 30–6, 16–2 to finish in second place in AAC play. They beat Tulsa and UConn in the AAC tournament before losing to SMU in the championship game. The Bearcats received an at-large bid to the NCAA tournament as the No. 6 seed in the South region. In the NCAA Tournament, they defeated No. 11 Kansas State in the First Round 75–61 before losing to No. 3 UCLA 79–67 in the Second Round.

== Offseason ==
=== Departing players ===
Name	Number	Pos.	Height	Weight	Year	Hometown	Notes
Troy Caupain	10	G	6'4"	210	Senior	Midlothian, Virginia	Graduated
Kevin Johnson	25	G	6'3"	185	Senior	Cincinnati, Ohio	Graduated
Zack Tobler	45	F	6'5"	225	Senior	Fort Mitchell, Kentucky	Walk-on; graduated
Quadri Moore	0	F	6'8"	230	Junior	Linden, New Jersey	Transferred to Northwestern Oklahoma State

=== Recruiting class of 2017 ===
College recruiting
Name	Hometown	School	Height	Weight	Commit date
Trevor Moore; SG	Houston, Texas	South Kent Prep	6 ft 4 in (1.93 m)	195 lb (88 kg)	Jun 29, 2016
Trevor Moore; SG	Recruit ratings: Scout: Rivals: 247Sports: (79)				
Eliel Nsoseme; C	Kinshasa, DR Congo	The RISE Centre Academy	6 ft 9 in (2.06 m)	185 lb (84 kg)	Aug 21, 2016
Eliel Nsoseme; C	Recruit ratings: Scout: Rivals: 247Sports: (NR)				
Keith Williams; SG	Brooklyn, New York	Bishop Loughlin Memorial High School	6 ft 5 in (1.96 m)	180 lb (82 kg)	Oct 4, 2016
Keith Williams; SG	Recruit ratings: Scout: Rivals: 247Sports: (80)				
Mamoudou Diarra; SF	Bamako, Mali	22ft Academy	6 ft 9 in (2.06 m)	205 lb (93 kg)	Apr 28, 2017
Mamoudou Diarra; SF	Recruit ratings: Scout: Rivals: 247Sports: (79)				
Overall recruit ranking:
Note: In many cases, Scout, Rivals, 247Sports, On3, and ESPN may conflict in their listings of height and weight.; In these cases, the average was taken. ESPN grades are on a 100-point scale.; Sources: "Cincinnati 2017 Player Commits". ESPN.; "2017 Team Ranking". Rivals.

Cincinnati will also add Preferred Walk-on Sam Martin a 5'10" PG from Summit Country Day School in Cincinnati, Ohio.

== Preseason ==
At the conference's annual media day, the Bearcats were narrowly picked to win the AAC receiving seven of the 12 first-place votes. Gary Clark, Jacob Evans, and Kyle Washington were named to the preseason All-AAC second team.

== Roster ==
2017–18 Cincinnati Bearcats men's basketball team
Players
Coaches

Pos.	#	Name	Height	Weight	Year	Previous school	Hometown
G/F	1	Jacob Evans	6 ft 6 in (1.98 m)	210 lb (95 kg)	Jr	St. Michael the Archangel High School	Baton Rouge, Louisiana
G	2	Keith Williams	6 ft 5 in (1.96 m)	190 lb (86 kg)	Fr	Bishop Loughlin Memorial High School	Brooklyn, New York
G	3	Justin Jenifer	5 ft 10 in (1.78 m)	175 lb (79 kg)	Jr	Milford Mill Academy	Baltimore, Maryland
G	5	Trevor Moore	6 ft 5 in (1.96 m)	195 lb (88 kg)	Fr	South Kent Prep	Houston, Texas
F	11	Gary Clark (C)	6 ft 8 in (2.03 m)	225 lb (102 kg)	Sr	Clayton High School	Clayton, North Carolina
F	13	Trevon Scott	6 ft 8 in (2.03 m)	225 lb (102 kg)	RS So	McIntosh County Academy	Darien, Georgia
F	14	Jackson Bart (W)	6 ft 5 in (1.96 m)	210 lb (95 kg)	RS So	Oral Roberts	Bartlesville, Oklahoma
G	15	Cane Broome	6 ft 0 in (1.83 m)	160 lb (73 kg)	Jr	Sacred Heart	East Hartford, Connecticut
F	20	Mamoudou Diarra (redshirt)	6 ft 9 in (2.06 m)	205 lb (93 kg)	Fr	22ft Academy	Bamako, Mali
C	22	Eliel Nsoseme	6 ft 8 in (2.03 m)	195 lb (88 kg)	Fr	The RISE Centre Academy	Kinshasa, DR Congo
F	24	Kyle Washington (C)	6 ft 9 in (2.06 m)	230 lb (104 kg)	RS Sr	NC State	Champlin, Minnesota
G	31	Sam Martin (W)	5 ft 10 in (1.78 m)	155 lb (70 kg)	Fr	Summit Country Day School	Cincinnati, Ohio
G	32	John Koz (W)	6 ft 1 in (1.85 m)	190 lb (86 kg)	So	Bay High School	Cleveland, Ohio
C	33	Nysier Brooks	6 ft 11 in (2.11 m)	240 lb (109 kg)	So	Advanced Prep International	Philadelphia, Pennsylvania
G	34	Jarron Cumberland	6 ft 5 in (1.96 m)	218 lb (99 kg)	So	Wilmington High School	Wilmington, Ohio

Head coach

- Mick Cronin (Cincinnati)

Assistant coach(es)

- Larry Davis (Asbury)
- Darren Savino (NJCU)
- Antwon Jackson (Pikeville)

Legend

- (C) Team captain
- (S) Suspended
- (I) Ineligible
- (W) Walk-on
- Injured
- Current redshirt

Roster
Last update: September 30, 2017

=== Depth chart ===
Pos.	Starting 5	Bench 1	Bench 2
C	Kyle Washington	Nysier Brooks	Eliel Nsoseme
PF	Gary Clark	Trevon Scott	Mamoudou Diarra
SF	Jacob Evans	Keith Williams	Jackson Bart
SG	Jarron Cumberland	Trevor Moore	John Koz
PG	Justin Jenifer	Cane Broome	Sam Martin

== Schedule and results ==
Date time, TV	Rank^{#}	Opponent^{#}	Result	Record	High points	High rebounds	High assists	Site (attendance) city, state
Exhibition
November 1, 2017*; 7:00pm	No. 12	vs. Bellarmine	W 89–61		15 – Washington	5 – 3 tied	4 – Broome	Freedom Hall (4,135); Louisville, KY
November 5, 2017*; 2:00pm, BearcatsTV	No. 12	Embry-Riddle	W 101–68		27 – Cumberland	8 – Clark	9 – Jenifer	BB&T Arena (3,589); Highland Heights, KY
Non-conference regular season
November 10, 2017*; 12:00pm, FSOH/ESPN3	No. 12	Savannah State	W 107–77	1–0	19 – Evans	11 – Clark	5 – 3 tied	BB&T Arena (6,610); Highland Heights, KY
November 13, 2017*; 7:00pm, ESPN3	No. 12	Western Carolina	W 102–51	2–0	20 – Cumberland	8 – Brooks	6 – Evans	BB&T Arena (7,051); Highland Heights, KY
November 16, 2017*; 7:00pm, FSOH/ESPN3	No. 12	Coppin State	W 97–54	3–0	19 – Cumberland	9 – Tied	4 – Evans	BB&T Arena (7,158); Highland Heights, KY
November 20, 2017*; 7:30pm, FloHoops	No. 12	vs. Buffalo; Cayman Islands Classic Quarterfinals	W 73–67	4–0	24 – Clark	14 – Clark	5 – Jenifer	John Gray Gymnasium (1,200); George Town, Cayman Islands
November 21, 2017*; 7:30pm, FloHoops	No. 12	vs. Richmond; Cayman Islands Classic Semifinals	W 75–48	5–0	13 – Broome	8 – Tied	7 – Clark	John Gray Gymnasium (1,400); George Town, Cayman Islands
November 22, 2017*; 7:30pm, FloHoops	No. 12	vs. Wyoming; Cayman Islands Classic Championship	W 78–53	6–0	17 – Clark	11 – Washington	5 – Evans	John Gray Gymnasium (1,530); George Town, Cayman Islands
November 27, 2017*; 7:00pm, ESPNU	No. 11	Alabama State	W 83–51	7–0	14 – Clark	7 – Tied	4 – Tied	BB&T Arena (7,012); Highland Heights, KY
December 2, 2017*; 12:00pm, FS1	No. 11	at No. 21 Xavier; Crosstown Shootout	L 76–89	7–1	23 – Evans	7 – Tied	4 – Jenifer	Cintas Center (10,817); Cincinnati, OH
December 9, 2017*; 6:00pm, ESPN2	No. 17	vs. No. 5 Florida; Never Forget Tribute Classic	L 60–66	7–2	15 – Broome	13 – Clark	2 – Cumberland	Prudential Center (9,112); Newark, NJ
December 12, 2017*; 7:00pm, ESPN2	No. 25	Mississippi State	W 66–50	8–2	24 – Evans	13 – Clark	4 – Tied	BB&T Arena (8,128); Highland Heights, KY
December 16, 2017*; 3:30pm, CBS	No. 25	at UCLA	W 77–63	9–2	19 – Washington	11 – Clark	5 – Cumberland	Pauley Pavilion (10,018); Los Angeles, CA
December 19, 2017*; 7:00pm, ESPN3	No. 20	Arkansas–Pine Bluff	W 77–49	10–2	17 – Broome	7 – Evans	3 – 3 tied	BB&T Arena (5,812); Highland Heights, KY
December 21, 2017*; 7:00pm, ESPN3	No. 20	Cleveland State	W 81–62	11–2	18 – Clark	9 – Washington	7 – Jenifer	BB&T Arena (7,988); Highland Heights, KY
AAC Regular Season
December 31, 2017; 4:00pm, ESPN2	No. 21	Memphis; Rivalry	W 82–48	12–2 (1–0)	15 – Cumberland	10 – Clark	6 – Evans	BB&T Arena (8,143); Highland Heights, KY
January 4, 2018; 9:00pm, ESPN2	No. 19	at Temple	W 55–53	13–2 (2–0)	18 – Washington	7 – Brooks	4 – Evans	Liacouras Center (4,274); Philadelphia, PA
January 7, 2018; 6:00pm, ESPN2	No. 19	SMU	W 76–56	14–2 (3–0)	18 – Tied	8 – Tied	4 – 3 tied	BB&T Arena (9,109); Highland Heights, KY
January 13, 2018; 7:00pm, ESPNews	No. 14	at South Florida	W 78–55	15–2 (4–0)	18 – Cumberland	10 – Clark	4 – Tied	USF Sun Dome (3,609); Tampa, FL
January 16, 2018; 7:00pm, CBSSN	No. 12	at UCF	W 49–38	16–2 (5–0)	17 – Clark	14 – Clark	3 – Cumberland	CFE Arena (7,565); Orlando, FL
January 20, 2018; 4:00pm, ESPNews	No. 12	East Carolina	W 86–60	17–2 (6–0)	17 – Tied	14 – Clark	6 – Broome	BB&T Arena (8,879); Highland Heights, KY
January 24, 2018; 9:00pm, CBSSN	No. 9	Temple	W 75–42	18–2 (7–0)	17 – Clark	10 – Clark	5 – Evans	BB&T Arena (8,924); Highland Heights, KY
January 27, 2018; 6:00pm, CBSSN	No. 9	at Memphis; Rivalry	W 62–48	19–2 (8–0)	18 – Clark	10 – Washington	6 – Broome	FedEx Forum (12,223); Memphis, TN
January 31, 2018; 7:00pm, CBSSN	No. 8	Houston	W 80–70	20–2 (9–0)	19 – Washington	10 – Clark	5 – Evans	BB&T Arena (8,885); Highland Heights, KY
February 3, 2018; 12:00pm, ESPN2	No. 8	at UConn	W 65–57	21–2 (10–0)	19 – Evans	11 – Washington	3 – Tied	Gampel Pavilion (9,170); Storrs, CT
February 6, 2018; 7:00pm, CBSSN	No. 6	UCF	W 77–40	22–2 (11–0)	14 – Moore	8 – Scott	5 – Broome	BB&T Arena (8,673); Highland Heights, KY
February 11, 2018; 4:00pm, ESPN	No. 6	at SMU	W 76–51	23–2 (12–0)	17 – Washington	8 – Washington	5 – Jenifer	Moody Coliseum (6,935); University Park, TX
February 15, 2018; 7:00pm, CBSSN	No. 5	at Houston	L 62–67	23–3 (12–1)	16 – Evans	7 – Clark	2 – Tied	H&PE Arena (5,363); Houston, TX
February 18, 2018; 4:00pm, ESPN	No. 5	No. 19 Wichita State	L 72–76	23–4 (12–2)	18 – Cumberland	8 – Clark	3 – Tied	BB&T Arena (9,523); Highland Heights, KY
February 22, 2018; 7:00pm, ESPN	No. 11	UConn	W 77–52	24–4 (13–2)	17 – Clark	9 – Scott	5 – Evans	BB&T Arena (8,217); Highland Heights, KY
February 25, 2018; 12:00pm, CBSSN	No. 11	Tulsa	W 82–74	25–4 (14–2)	17 – Tied	7 – Scott	8 – Cumberland	BB&T Arena (8,911); Highland Heights, KY
March 1, 2018; 9:00pm, ESPN2	No. 10	at Tulane	W 78–49	26–4 (15–2)	16 – Washington	9 – Clark	5 – Cumberland	Devlin Fieldhouse (2,824); New Orleans, LA
March 4, 2018; 12:00pm, CBS	No. 10	at No. 11 Wichita State	W 62–61	27–4 (16–2)	19 – Evans	7 – Tied	2 – Tied	Charles Koch Arena (10,506); Wichita, KS
AAC Tournament
March 9, 2018; 12:00pm, ESPN2	(1) No. 8	vs. (9) SMU; Quarterfinals	W 61–51	28–4	15 – Washington	9 – Clark	8 – Cumberland	Amway Center (8,491); Orlando, FL
March 10, 2018; 1:00pm, CBS	(1) No. 8	vs. (5) Memphis; Semifinals/Rivalry	W 70–60	29–4	18 – Cumberland	12 – Clark	5 – Tied	Amway Center (8,644); Orlando, FL
March 11, 2018; 3:30pm, CBS	(1) No. 8	vs. (3) No. 21 Houston; Championship	W 56–55	30–4	20 – Clark	12 – Clark	3 – Evans	Amway Center (8,670); Orlando, FL
NCAA tournament
March 16, 2018*; 2:00pm, TBS	(2 S) No. 6	vs. (15 S) Georgia State; First Round	W 68–53	31–4	27 – Cumberland	13 – Clark	5 – Jenifer	Bridgestone Arena (17,552); Nashville, TN
March 18, 2018*; 6:10pm, TNT	(2 S) No. 6	vs. (7 S) No. 24 Nevada; Second Round	L 73–75	31–5	19 – Evans	11 – Washington	3 – 2 tied	Bridgestone Arena (17,552); Nashville, TN
*Non-conference game. ^{#}Rankings from AP Poll. (#) Tournament seedings in parentheses. S=South. All times are in Eastern Time.

== Awards and milestones ==
=== All-American ===
- Honorable Mention: Gary Clark

=== American Athletic Conference honors ===
==== All-AAC Awards ====
- Player of the Year: Gary Clark
- Defensive Player of the Year: Gary Clark
- Sportsmanship Award: Gary Clark

==== All-AAC First Team ====
- Gary Clark
- Jacob Evans

==== All-AAC Honorable Mention ====
- Kyle Washington

==== Player of the Week ====
- Week 3: Gary Clark
- Week 6: Jacob Evans
- Week 9: Jacob Evans
- Week 11: Gary Clark
- Week 12: Gary Clark

==== Weekly Honor Roll ====
- Week 2: Jarron Cumberland
- Week 6: Gary Clark
- Week 8: Jarron Cumberland
- Week 10: Jarron Cumberland
- Week 13: Jacob Evans
- Week 14: Kyle Washington
- Week 16: Gary Clark
- Week 17: Jacob Evans

== Rankings ==
Ranking movements Legend: ██ Increase in ranking ██ Decrease in ranking RV = Received votes ( ) = First-place votes
	Week																			
Poll	Pre	1	2	3	4	5	6	7	8	9	10	11	12	13	14	15	16	17	18	Final
AP	12	12	12	11	17	25	20	21	19	14	12	9	8	6	5	11	10	8	6	Not released
Coaches	13	13	13	9	18	RV	22	22	20	13	11	8	8	6	5 (1)	11	10	8	10	12

*AP does not release post-NCAA tournament rankings
