= Savannah Invitational =

Defunct basketball tournament

- Sport: College basketball
- Founded: 2016; 10 years ago
- Founder: Savannah Sports Council
- Folded: 2017
- No. of teams: 8
- Venues: Savannah Civic Center, Savannah, Georgia
- Website: Savannah Invitational

The Savannah Invitational was a college basketball tournament founded in 2016 held at the Savannah Civic Center in Savannah, Georgia. The event included both a men's and a women's tournament.

== 2016 ==
=== Men's tournament ===
The men's tournament took place November 20–26. The eight participating teams were divided into two brackets, a "host" bracket and a "visitors" bracket. Each of the four "host" teams hosted two of the "visitors" teams in games on their campuses in the first two rounds of the tournament on November 20 and 22. Regardless of the results of those two rounds, the four "host" teams then met one another in a bracketed tournament in Savannah in the third and championship rounds on November 25 and 26. Meanwhile, the four "visitor" teams also met in Savannah on November 25 and 26 to play a non-bracketed round-robin among themselves, with no championship awarded to them.

==== Campus games ====
First Round; November 20
Stetson	50
East Carolina	73

First Round; November 20
Georgia Southern	67
Mercer	80

First Round; November 20
Florida A&M	62
Air Force	87

First Round; November 20
Radford	41
Akron	88

Second Round; November 22
Georgia Southern	67
Akron	75

Second Round; November 22
Florida A&M	62
East Carolina	82

Second Round; November 22
Radford	47
Mercer	58

Second Round; November 22
Stetson	72
Air Force	85

==== Host bracket ====
Third Round
November 26
Mercer	70
East Carolina	66
November 26
Akron	84
Air Force	75

Championship
November 27
Mercer	63
Akron	65
Consolation
November 27
East Carolina	70
Air Force	63

==== Visitors bracket ====
Third Round; November 26
Radford	80
Stetson	66

Third Round; November 26
Georgia Southern	83
Florida A&M	72

Final Round; November 27
Stetson	98
Florida A&M	90

Final Round; November 27
Radford	64
Georgia Southern	65

=== Women's tournament ===
The women's tournament was played November 22–24. The format was a three-round round-robin, with all games played in Savannah.

First Round
East Carolina	70
Marist	68

First Round
Auburn	54
Ball State	40

First Round
North Carolina A&T	64
West Virginia	80

Second Round
Ball State	76
North Carolina A&T	57

Second Round
East Carolina	47
West Virginia	79

Second Round
Marist	51
Auburn	52

Third Round
North Carolina A&T	64
Marist	69

Third Round
Ball State	69
East Carolina	82^{(OT)}

Third Round
West Virginia	56
Auburn	52

== 2017 ==
=== Men's tournament ===
In 2017, the men's event was played November 11–26. As in 2016, the eight participating teams were divided into a "Host" bracket and a "Visitors" bracket. In the first round, held on November 11 and November 19, each of the four "Host" bracket teams played a home game on its campus against one of the four "Visitors" bracket teams. "Visitor" bracket team North Carolina Wesleyan played no further games in the Invitational, and "Host" team UNC Wilmington had a bye in the second round, but the other three "hosts" played another on-campus game against another of the three remaining "visitors" in the second round, held on November 21. Regardless of the results of these two rounds the four "host" teams then met in Savannah to play one another on November 24–25. Unlike in 2016, the "Host" teams met in a two-round round-robin "Hosts' Showcase" event in Savannah rather than in a bracketed tournament, a change made because "Host" bracket team Valparaiso had made a late move from the Horizon League to the Missouri Valley Conference, to which "Host" bracket team Loyola–Chicago also belonged; NCAA regulations prohibited teams from the same conference participating in the same in-season non-conference tournament, and the round-robin "showcase" format allowed the Invitational both to comply with NCAA non-conference tournament regulations and to ensure no meeting between Valparaiso and Loyola-Chicago. As a result of the non-bracketed "showcase" format, no championship was awarded in the "Host" bracket in 2017. Meanwhile, the three remaining "Visitor" bracket teams met at the Pete Hanna Center on the campus of Samford University in Birmingham, Alabama, on November 24, 25, and 26 to play one another in the "Visitors Subregional," a non-bracketed round-robin with no championship awarded.

==== Campus games ====
First Round; November 11
North Carolina Wesleyan	81
UNC Wilmington	105

First Round; November 19
Mississippi Valley State	67
Kent State	80

First Round; November 19
Samford	67
Loyola–Chicago	88

First Round; November 19
Southeastern Louisiana	50
Valparaiso	83

Second Round; November 21
Southeastern Louisiana	70
Kent State	66

Second Round; November 21
Mississippi Valley State	50
Loyola-Chicago	63

Second Round; November 21
Samford	67
Valparaiso	88

==== Hosts' Showcase ====
Third Round; November 24
Loyola–Chicago	102
UNC Wilmington	78

Third Round; November 24
Valparaiso	77
Kent State	67

Final Round; November 25
Loyola–Chicago	75
Kent State	60

Final Round; November 25
UNC Wilmington	70
Valparaiso	79

==== Visitors' Subregional ====
November 24
Southeastern Louisiana	77
Samford	71

November 25
Mississippi Valley State	59
Southeastern Louisiana	73

November 26
Mississippi Valley State	70
Samford	83

=== Women's tournament ===
The women's tournament was played November 21–23. The format was a three-round round-robin.

First Round
Stetson	59
Wright State	64

First Round
Florida	87
Richmond	80

First Round
Providence	78
Savannah State	48

Second Round
Richmond	100
Savannah State	63

Second Round
Wright State	69
Providence	74

Second Round
Florida	71
Stetson	85

Third Round
Richmond	69
Wright State	85

Third Round
Providence	56
Stetson	45

Third Round
Savannah State	40
Florida	90
