= Eric Hosmer =

American baseball player (born 1989)

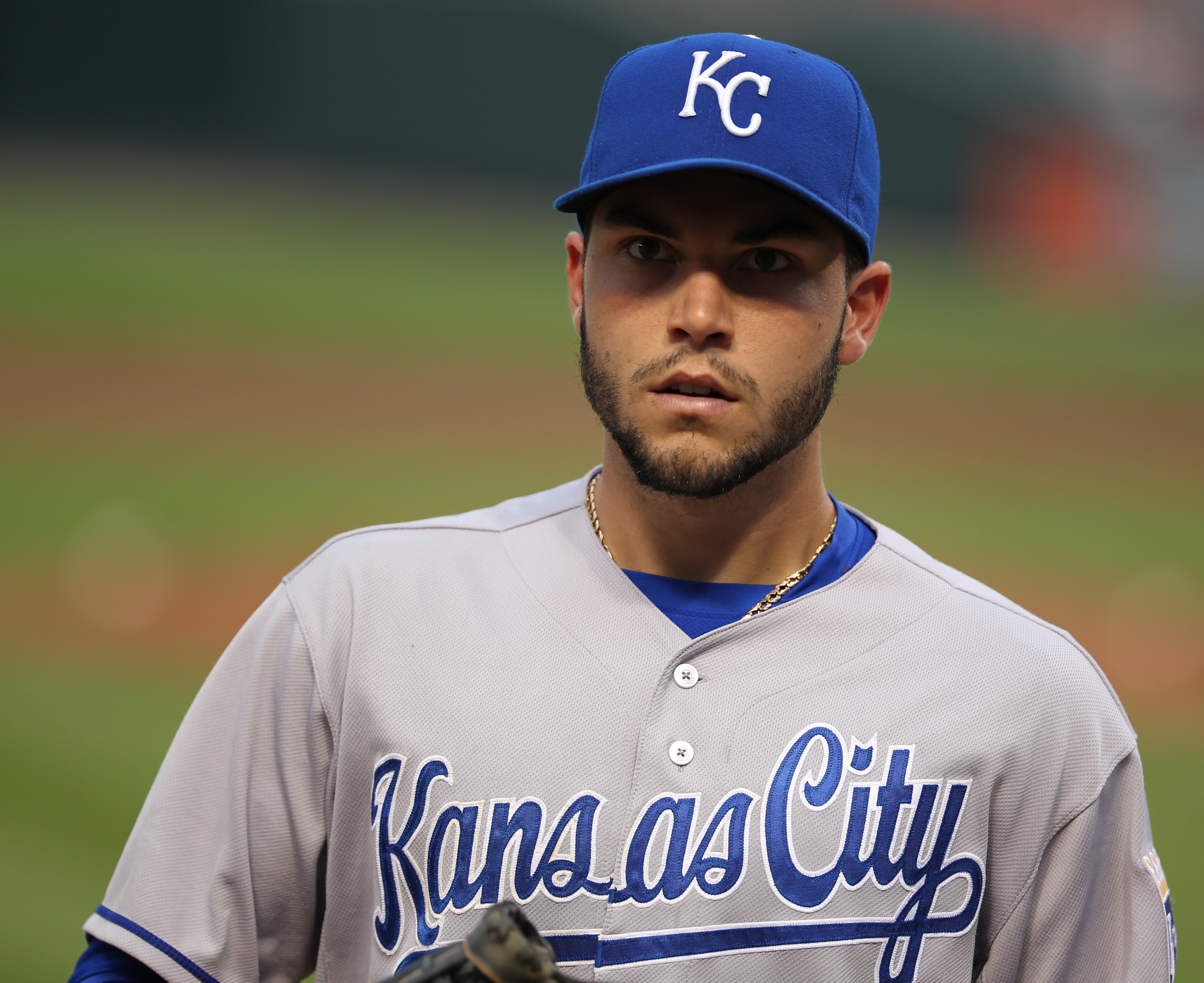
- Hosmer with the Kansas City Royals in 2011
- First baseman
- Born: October 24, 1989 (age 37); South Miami, Florida, U.S.
- Batted: Left Threw: Left

MLB debut
- May 6, 2011, for the Kansas City Royals

Last MLB appearance
- May 16, 2023, for the Chicago Cubs

MLB statistics
- Batting average: .276
- Home runs: 198
- Runs batted in: 893
- Stats at Baseball Reference

Teams
- Kansas City Royals (2011–2017); San Diego Padres (2018–2022); Boston Red Sox (2022); Chicago Cubs (2023)

Career highlights and awards
- All-Star (2016); World Series champion (2015); 4× Gold Glove Award (2013–2015, 2017); Silver Slugger Award (2017); Kansas City Royals Hall of Fame
Medals
Men's baseball
Representing United States
World Baseball Classic
Gold medal – first place	2017 Los Angeles	Team

Eric John Hosmer (born October 24, 1989) is an American former professional baseball first baseman. He played in Major League Baseball (MLB) for the Kansas City Royals, San Diego Padres, Boston Red Sox, and Chicago Cubs. Internationally, Hosmer represents the United States. In the 2017 World Baseball Classic (WBC), he helped win Team USA's first gold medal in a WBC tournament and was named to the All-World Baseball Classic Team.

A highly touted prospect coming out of American Heritage High School in Florida, Hosmer was described as a "left-handed hitter with raw power" by scouts. The Royals selected him with third overall pick in the 2008 MLB draft, and he received a $6 million signing bonus. He advanced in Minor League Baseball before debuting in MLB during the 2011 season. He finished third in the Rookie of the Year balloting after the 2011 season after hitting .293 with 19 home runs in 128 games. Hosmer won consecutive Gold Glove Awards from 2013 through 2015 and again in 2017, when he also won the Silver Slugger Award. He was the MVP of the 2016 MLB All-Star Game, and was a member of the 2015 World Series champion Royals.

After the 2017 season, Hosmer became a free agent, and signed an eight-year contract with the Padres. During the 2022 season, the Padres traded him to the Red Sox. The Red Sox released him after the season, and he signed a one-year contract with the Cubs.

== Early life ==
Hosmer's father, Mike, is a retired firefighter, and his mother, Ileana, is a nurse. His mother was born in Cuba and came to the United States at the age of seven with her family to escape Fidel Castro's regime, growing up in Pittsburgh, Pennsylvania. His parents met in 1979 when Mike was assigned to duty at Coral Gables Hospital in Coral Gables, Florida, where Ileana worked. They married four years later. Their first son, Mike Jr., was born in 1985, and Eric was born four years later in Miami.

Growing up in Cooper City, Hosmer credited his family for helping him succeed as a baseball player. He began playing baseball at an early age, using a Tony Gwynn teeball hitter to take practice swings. His father volunteered to work 48-hour shifts in a firehouse in Liberty City to focus on his son's baseball games, which he usually coached. The Hosmers traveled all over the state, and as far as Cooperstown, New York, home of the Baseball Hall of Fame, to play in baseball tournaments. At home, Hosmer watched Florida Marlins games to study the hitting techniques of the team's players in order to improve his skills. His father helped him with batting practice after finishing long shifts at work, while his mother helped with his homework and recorded every baseball game to evaluate Hosmer's baseball ability and further hone his skills. By the time Hosmer reached high school, he worked out "close to seven hours a day" and mainly ate protein, which helped form his muscular build. Hosmer's family hired Bladimir Marrero, a highly regarded hitting instructor, to help with their son's skills.

Hosmer grew up a New York Yankees fan.

== High school career ==
By the time Hosmer was a teenager, he was a member of several Little League baseball squads that won a couple of state championships. He attended American Heritage School in Plantation, Florida. His parents selected American Heritage because of its rich baseball program, which was considered to be one of the best in the United States, despite the expensive tuition. By Hosmer's sophomore year, he grew eight inches in size, becoming a powerful prep prospect. In his senior year, Hosmer hit .470 with 11 home runs, as the team was in the top 10 in USA Today's Super 25 rankings for most of the year and won a state championship. He attracted twenty or more MLB and college scouts who evaluated Hosmer's every move. Several of his amateur home runs had popularity in YouTube, which caught the attention of sports agent Scott Boras. He received many achievements while in high school including being named as Florida's Baseball Player of the Year twice by the Miami Herald, a member of the Rawlings High School Gold Glove team and the American Amateur Baseball Congress Connie Mack MVP award. Hosmer was offered a baseball scholarship to Arizona State University. Hosmer planned to attend Arizona State if negotiations with an MLB team did not go through.

He was named as one of the top five prep baseball players in the country by several scouting agencies by the time he graduated in 2008, including number two by Rivals.com and third by both RISE Magazine and Sports Illustrated. As "one of high school baseball top power hitters" by scouts, and a consensus top 10 pick, Hosmer was chosen by the Kansas City Royals in the first round (third overall selection) of the 2008 MLB draft. Hosmer remained unsigned for most of the summer while the Royals general manager Dayton Moore and Boras, operating as Hosmer's agent, negotiated a deal. During negotiations, Hosmer helped lead his team, based in Cincinnati, to a second-place finish at the American Amateur Baseball Congress Connie Mack World Series. The two sides agreed to a contract ten minutes before the signing deadline for drafted players on August 15, 2008. Hosmer received a $6 million signing bonus, the largest given to a draft pick in Royals history.

== Professional career ==
=== Minor leagues (2008–2011) ===
Soon after signing his contract, the Royals assigned Hosmer to Minor League Baseball with the Idaho Falls Chukars of the rookie level Pioneer League. Before reporting to the Chukars, Royals general manager Moore told reporters that Hosmer would not be "rushed" to reach the Majors, stating that he needed to advance though the Minor League hierarchy in his "own natural pace". Hosmer played a handful of games with the Chukars before a contract dispute with another Boras client, Pittsburgh Pirates second overall pick Pedro Álvarez, delayed Hosmer from playing with the team. Boras had claimed that Álvarez signed his contract after the August 15 deadline had passed; thus, he would not report to the Pirates. The Major League Baseball Players Association filed a grievance stating that Hosmer's contract was also signed past the deadline and that Major League Baseball extended the August 15 deadline without the association's permission. Both sides settled the claim a month later, allowing Hosmer and Álvarez to join their respective teams. Hosmer never disputed his original contract. Instead of heading back to the Chukars, Hosmer was sent to the Arizona Fall League to train.

In Hosmer's first full season in the minor leagues, he was assigned to the Burlington Bees in the Class A Midwest League. At Burlington, Hosmer struggled at the plate. By June 1, he had hit only one home run in 31 games while leading the team in strikeouts. He missed some time with a left pinkie finger injury. At the end of the season, Hosmer hit .241 with six home runs. He later referred to the 2009 season as "a tough year". In 2010, Hosmer was named the seventh best first base prospect by Scout.com. He started the season with the Royals' Class A-Advanced affiliate, the Wilmington Blue Rocks of the Carolina League. where his struggles continued. He was soon diagnosed with astigmatism, an eye condition, and had laser surgery to correct the problem. Hosmer returned to the Blue Rocks a week later; with the eye issue addressed, his hitting immediately improved. By May 23 he was hitting .388 with a .571 slugging percentage. He played in the 2010 All-Star Futures Game, and had four hits and two RBI in a 9–1 victory. For his efforts, Hosmer was promoted to the Northwest Arkansas Naturals of the Class AA Texas League on July 17, where he homered in his first at-bat. During the playoffs Hosmer hit six home runs, the second highest total by a player in a single Texas League playoff series. The team went on to win the Texas League championship.

The Royals' farm system was ranked number one in baseball entering the 2011 season, led by Hosmer and another top prospect, third baseman Mike Moustakas. Most baseball critics agreed that the Royals, a team known for mediocrity the past two decades, would be a contender within a couple of years; they had nine prospects in Baseball America's top 100, a record for the publication. Hosmer was ranked as the best prospect among first baseman in Major League Baseball prior to the 2011 season. He was also rated the eighth best overall prospect by Baseball America, and the top Royals prospect overall. With the Royals receiving attention for their bright future, the team's general manager Dayton Moore traded their best player, Cy Young Award winner Zack Greinke, to the Milwaukee Brewers in exchange for four top prospects, putting even more emphasis on the team's future. Hosmer began the season with the Royals Class AAA affiliate, the Omaha Storm Chasers of the Pacific Coast League (PCL). When the Royals purchased Hosmer's contract on May 5, 2011, he was leading the minor leagues with a .439 batting average, and the PCL with 43 hits and a .525 on-base percentage.

=== Kansas City Royals (2011–2017) ===
==== 2011 ====
There's no question in my mind he won't end up being a special player because he's got all the attributes to being a special player.

— Kansas City manager Ned Yost discussing Hosmer's MLB debut.

The Royals recalled Hosmer on May 5, 2011. Veteran catcher Jason Kendall was moved to the 60-day disabled list to make space for Hosmer on the 40-man roster. He made his MLB debut at first base the following day against Oakland Athletics starter Gio González, replacing Kila Ka'aihue. Prior to his debut, Hosmer was being touted by journalists as a "super-prospect" and the "most-hyped" rookie to debut for the Royals since Bo Jackson. The Royals promoted Hosmer before a mid-June deadline in which the Royals could have avoided salary arbitration for an extra year. Hosmer went hitless in two at-bats, striking out twice. He also walked twice and stole a base in a 3–2 loss as the Royals had the second biggest crowd of the season.

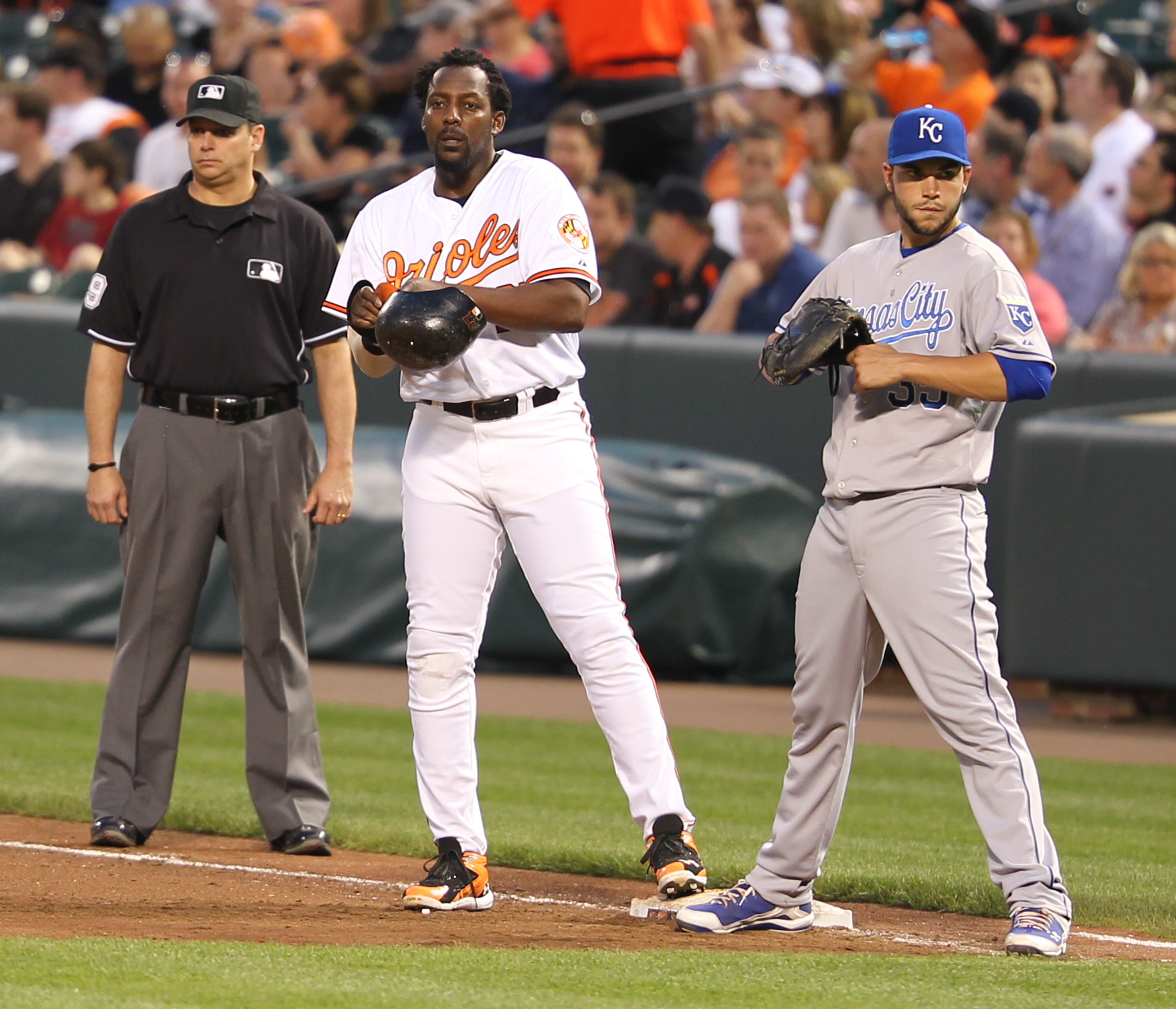
Hosmer playing in position with Vladimir Guerrero on first during a game against the Baltimore Orioles

On May 11 at Yankee Stadium, Hosmer started as the cleanup hitter for the Royals; he hit his first MLB home run off Yankees pitcher A. J. Burnett. In his first month with the Royals, he hit .283 with five home runs, and was named the Royals Player of the Month. His batting average fell 14 points by the end of June, with manager Ned Yost citing "impatience at the plate". He hit a game-winning two-run home run against closer Matt Capps of the Minnesota Twins on July 16. The home run led the Twins to replace Capps with Joe Nathan as its closer the next day. In the month of July, Hosmer was named the American League (AL) Rookie of the Month. He had five hits, including a three-run home run against Brad Penny in a 10–2 win against the Detroit Tigers on September 20. The next day, sportswriter Ian Casselberry of MLive.com called Hosmer a "Tiger killer" because of his statistics against the Tigers, which included a .346 batting average with four home runs that season. He led all rookies in most major batting categories for September, earning him a second Rookie of the Month award.

Hosmer finished third in AL Rookie of the Year voting behind Mark Trumbo of the Los Angeles Angels and winner Jeremy Hellickson of the Tampa Bay Rays. He hit .293 with 19 home runs and 78 runs batted in (RBIs) in 128 games. Yost praised Hosmer, and another rookie, catcher Salvador Pérez, calling them "future perennial All-Star players".

==== 2012–2013 ====
On February 18, 2012, the Royals announced they had signed Hosmer to a one-year contract for the 2012 season. No financial terms of the deal were released. During spring training, Hosmer led all players with 29 RBIs and had a slugging percentage of .714. Discussing Hosmer's spring training, Royals Hall of Famer George Brett said, "He's a baseball player... He acts like a baseball player. And boy, he's going to be a damn good one, too." By opening day, the Kansas City media was hyping Hosmer as the "face of the franchise", and the city's " next future sports star". He started at first base on opening day against the L.A. Angels, going 0-for-4. He hit a home run in a 6–3 victory the next day but later struggled, hitting below .200 for the first couple of weeks of the season as the Royals endured an 11-game losing streak entering April 24. He ended the season with a .232/.304/.359 slash line to go along with 14 home runs and 60 RBIs.

In 2013, Hosmer's defense earned him his first Gold Glove Award. He finished the year with a .302 batting average, 17 home runs, and 79 RBI.

==== 2014 ====
On July 20, 2014, in a game against the Boston Red Sox, Hosmer was hit in the hand by a pitch from Jon Lester. At first, he was only day-to-day with a bruised hand. However, on July 31, in a game against the Minnesota Twins, he aggravated the injury on a checked swing in the fourth inning. X-rays revealed a displaced fracture of the third finger on his right hand. Hosmer missed four weeks due to the injury. He finished the season batting .270 with nine home runs and 58 RBIs.

In the 2014 postseason, Hosmer helped lead the Royals to a record-setting run, winning three consecutive extra-inning games. After getting on base five times in the wildcard game against the Oakland A's, Hosmer also slammed a game-winning, two-run homer in Game 2 of the ALDS against the Los Angeles Angels of Anaheim. In doing so, he became the first player in MLB history to hit both a triple and a home run during extra innings in one year's postseason.

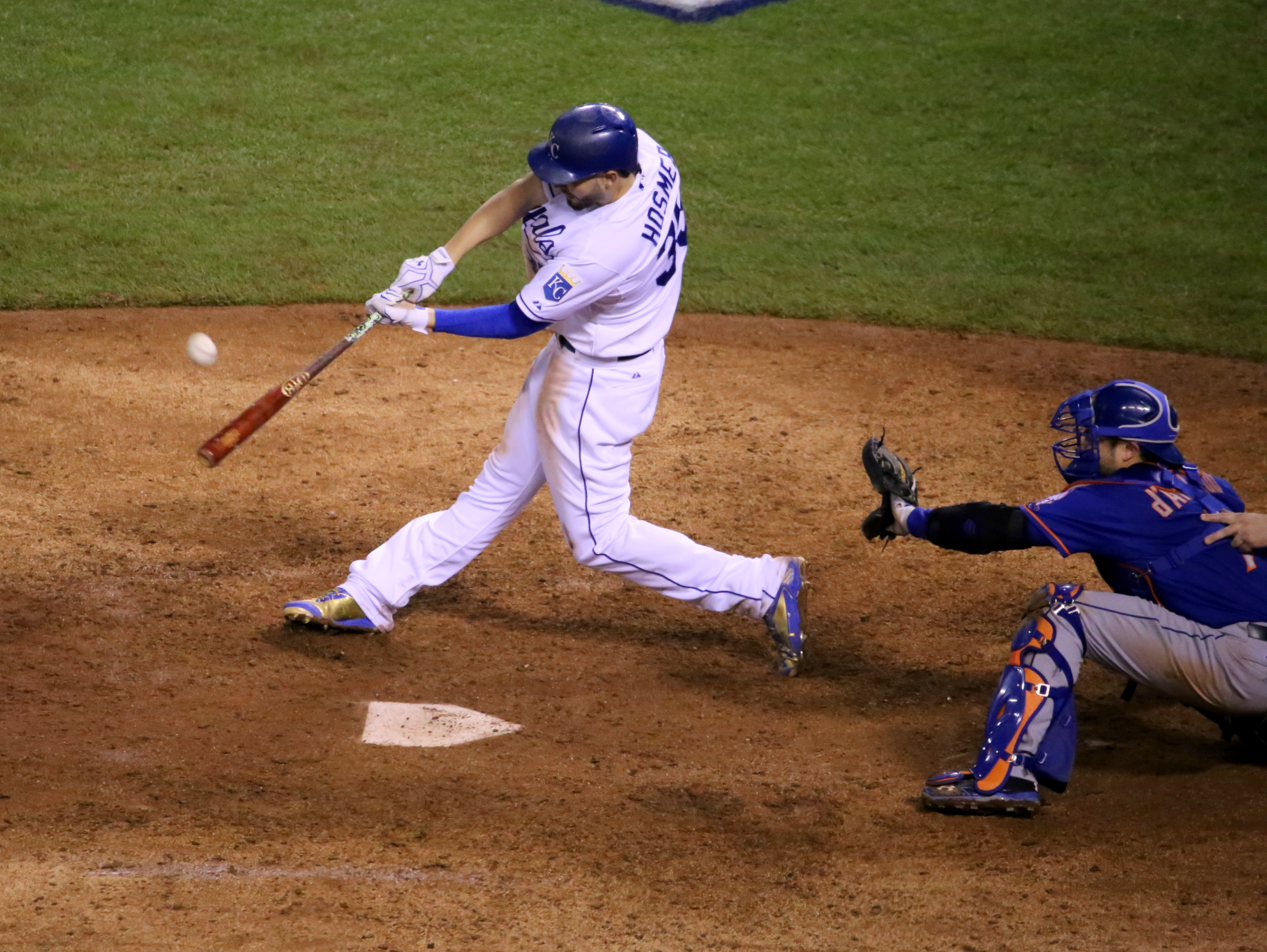
Hosmer's walk-off sac fly in Game 1 of the 2015 World Series

In the early morning hours of October 6, after the Royals had completed their sweep of the Angels, Hosmer posted on Twitter, inviting Kansas City fans to come out and celebrate with him at a downtown bar, the Power and Light District. Eventually, it was reported, "...(h)ordes showed up, and many of the fans ended up with free drinks as Hosmer...decided to help pay for an open bar for an hour. With several teammates, he also sprayed some champagne into the crowd."

The Royals swept the Baltimore Orioles in the 2014 American League Championship Series, as Hosmer contributed with a .400 batting average for the series. In the 2014 World Series, Hosmer batted .250, as the Royals lost to the San Francisco Giants in seven games.

==== 2015 ====
On February 18, 2015, Hosmer and the Royals agreed to a $13.9 million, two-year contract. He would earn $5.65 million during the 2015 season and $8.25 million during the 2016 season, and would be eligible for arbitration again in 2017. During the 2015 season, Hosmer had his best year to that point, with a .297 batting average, 18 home runs and 93 RBIs. Hosmer also recorded the final putout of the AL Central and the American League Championship Series clinching games. On October 23, Hosmer tied George Brett for the most RBIs in the postseason (23) in Royals' franchise history when he singled Lorenzo Cain home from first base representing the go-ahead run in Game 6 of the ALCS. In Game 1 of the 2015 World Series, Hosmer overtook Brett's record for the most RBIs in the postseason with a walk-off sacrifice fly to bring in Alcides Escobar in the 14th inning, representing Hosmer's 25th postseason RBI and helping atone for an eighth-inning error that helped the Mets take a one-run lead. Hosmer starred again in Game 2 with two hits, a run scored, and two RBIs to help the Royals take a 7–1 win and a 2–0 series lead. On November 1 in Game 5, Hosmer took advantage of a scouting report on the Mets' Lucas Duda to score the tying run in the ninth inning: on a groundout to first, Hosmer broke from third to the plate and beat a throw which was offline. This eventually led to the Royals' win to clinch the Series.

Hosmer won his third consecutive Gold Glove Award for the 2015 season.

==== 2016–2017 ====
Hosmer was named the 2016 MLB All-Star Game MVP, played in San Diego on July 12. In the second inning of the All-Star Game, he hit a game-tying home run off of former teammate Johnny Cueto. In 158 games of 2016, Hosmer finished with a .266 batting average, a career-high 25 home runs, and 104 RBI.

In 2017, Hosmer played all 162 regular season games, finishing with a career-high .318 batting average while tying his personal best 25 home runs. He added 94 RBI along with a career-best .385 on-base percentage. He won his fourth career Gold Glove Award. After the season, Hosmer became a free agent for the first time of his career.

=== San Diego Padres (2018–2022) ===
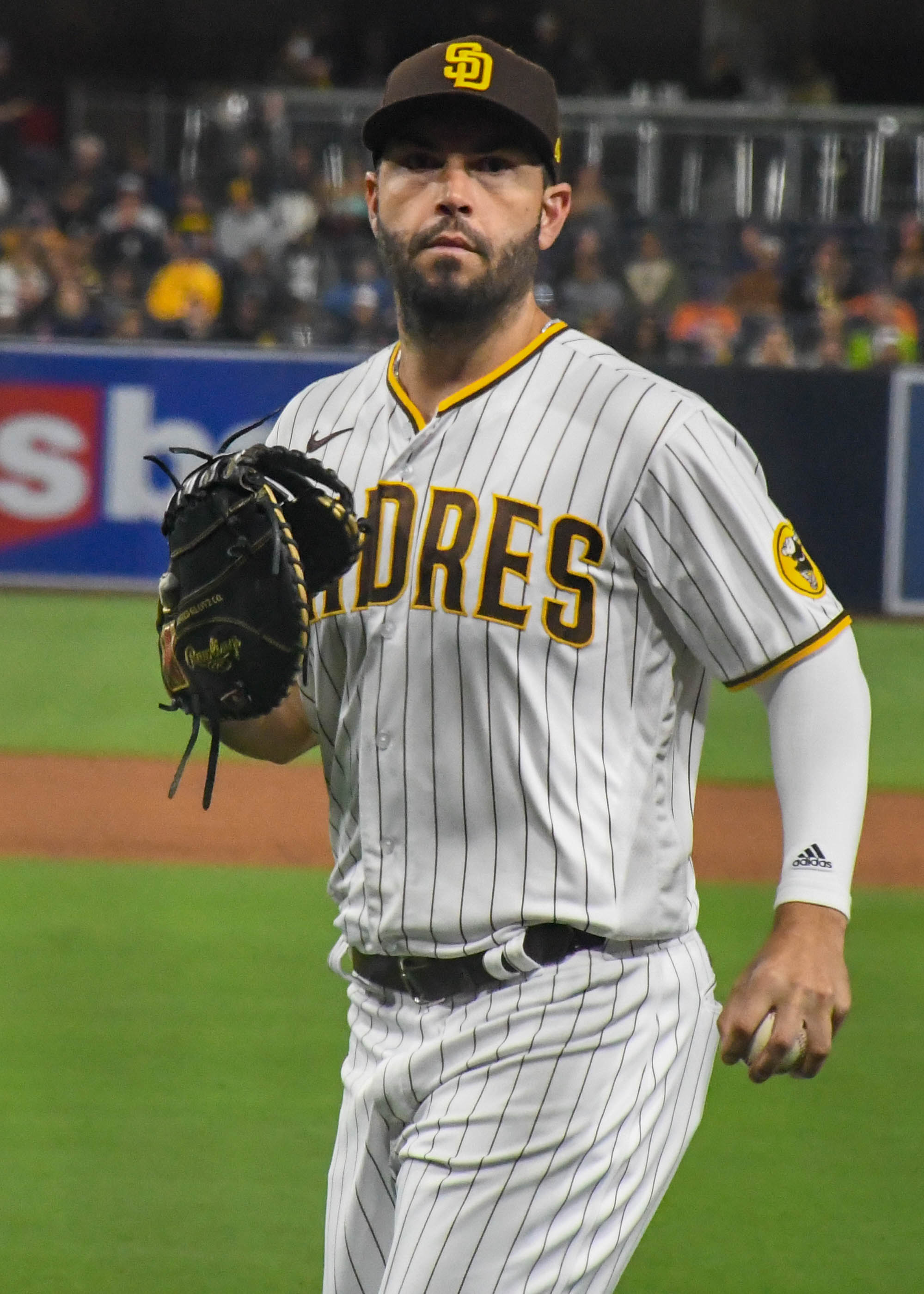
Hosmer in 2021

On February 19, 2018, Hosmer signed an eight-year, $144 million contract with the San Diego Padres, the largest contract in Padres franchise history at the time. Hosmer changed his jersey to No. 30 in honor of former Royals teammate Yordano Ventura, who had died a year earlier. Hosmer's previous No. 35 was already retired by the Padres for Randy Jones. In his first season as a Padre, Hosmer hit .253 with 18 home runs and 69 RBIs. In 2019, Hosmer slashed .265/.310/.425 with 22 home runs and 99 RBI as the primary cleanup hitter for the Padres. He led all NL first basemen in errors, with 14.

On August 20, 2020, Hosmer hit a grand slam against the Texas Rangers, making the Padres the first team in MLB history to hit a grand slam in four consecutive games, following grand slams by Fernando Tatís Jr., Wil Myers and Manny Machado. Hosmer finished the shortened 2020 season slashing .287/.333/.517 with nine home runs and 36 RBIs in 38 games.

During the 2021 season, Hosmer played in 151 games for the Padres, posting a .269/.337/.395 slash line with 12 home runs and 65 RBIs. In 2022, he appeared in 90 games for San Diego through the start of August, batting .272 with eight home runs and 40 RBIs.

=== Boston Red Sox (2022) ===
On August 2, 2022, Hosmer and two minor-league players (Max Ferguson and Corey Rosier) plus cash considerations were traded to the Boston Red Sox in exchange for minor-league pitcher Jay Groome. Hosmer was originally slated to be included in a blockbuster trade to the Washington Nationals for Juan Soto; however, Hosmer exercised his no-trade clause against the deal. Upon joining the Red Sox, Hosmer played as the team's primary first baseman. He was placed on the injured list on August 23, due to low back inflammation, and reactivated on October 3 for the final series of the season.

In 14 games for Boston, Hosmer batted .244/.320/.311 with four RBIs. On December 16, he was designated for assignment by the Red Sox following the acquisition of Wyatt Mills. Hosmer was released on December 22.

=== Chicago Cubs (2023) ===
On January 13, 2023, Hosmer signed a one-year contract with the Chicago Cubs. He played in 31 games for the Cubs, with a .234 batting average, two home runs and 14 RBI before he was designated for assignment on May 19. Hosmer was released by the Cubs on May 25.

=== Retirement ===
On February 21, 2024, Hosmer announced his retirement from playing in an Instagram post while also announcing the creation of his own media company, MoonBall Media. Although he had opportunities to continue playing, Hosmer felt that both his focus and physical abilities were not where they should be to justify continuing his playing career.

== International career ==
Hosmer played for Team USA at the 2017 World Baseball Classic. He hit the go-ahead home run in a second-round comeback win over Venezuela. Team USA went on to defeat Puerto Rico in the championship game to claim its first World Baseball Classic title, with Hosmer catching the throw at first base for the tournament's final out. Following the conclusion of the tournament, he was named to the 2017 All-World Baseball Classic team.

== Personal ==
In October 2020, Hosmer became engaged to Fox News sports host Kacie McDonnell. The two married on December 31, 2021. They announced in April 2022 that they were expecting their first child later that year. Their son was born in September 2022.
