= 2017–18 Nevada Wolf Pack men's basketball team =

American college basketball season

2017–18 Nevada Wolf Pack men's basketball

Mountain West regular season champions

NCAA tournament, Sweet Sixteen
- Conference: Mountain West Conference

Ranking
- Coaches: No. 20
- AP: No. 24
- Record: 29–8 (15–3 MW)
- Head coach: Eric Musselman (3rd season)
- Assistant coaches: Johnny Jones; Anthony Ruta; Gus Argenal
- Home arena: Lawlor Events Center

2017–18 Mountain West Conference men's basketball standings
	Conf.				Overall
Team	W		L	PCT	W		L	PCT
No. 24 Nevada	15	–	3	.833	29	–	8	.784
Boise State	13	–	5	.722	23	–	9	.719
New Mexico	12	–	6	.667	19	–	15	.559
Fresno State	11	–	7	.611	21	–	11	.656
San Diego State †	11	–	7	.611	22	–	11	.667
Wyoming	10	–	8	.556	20	–	13	.606
UNLV	8	–	10	.444	20	–	13	.606
Utah State	8	–	10	.444	17	–	17	.500
Air Force	6	–	12	.333	12	–	19	.387
Colorado State	4	–	14	.222	11	–	21	.344
San Jose State	1	–	17	.056	4	–	26	.133
† Conference tournament winner Rankings from AP poll

The 2017–18 Nevada Wolf Pack men's basketball team represented the University of Nevada, Reno during the 2017–18 NCAA Division I men's basketball season. The Wolf Pack, led by third-year head coach Eric Musselman, played their home games at the Lawlor Events Center in Reno, Nevada as members of the Mountain West Conference. They finished the season 29–8, 15–3 in Mountain West play to win the Mountain West regular season championship. They defeated UNLV in the quarterfinals of the Mountain West tournament before losing in the semifinals to San Diego State. They received an at-large bid to the NCAA tournament where they defeated Texas in the first round, then made a stunning 22-point comeback in the final 11 minutes of the game to beat Cincinnati. This tied the second largest comeback in terms of deficit in NCAA Tournament history. They then lost to eventual Final Four team Loyola Chicago in the Sweet Sixteen.

== Previous season ==
The Wolf Pack finished the season 28–7, 14–4 in Mountain West play to win the Mountain West regular season championship. They defeated Utah State, Fresno State, and Colorado State to win the Mountain West tournament championship. They received the conference's automatic bid to the NCAA tournament where they lost in the first round to Iowa State.

== Offseason ==
=== Departures ===
Name	Number	Pos.	Height	Weight	Year	Hometown	Reason for departure
Cameron Oliver	0	F	6'8"	225	Sophomore	Sacramento, CA	Declare for 2017 NBA draft
Marcus Marshall	1	G	6'3"	190	RS Senior	Saint Paul, MN	Graduated
Leland King II	2	F	6'7"	215	RS Junior	Inglewood, CA	Walk-on; graduate transferred to UC Santa Barbara
Devearl Ramsey	4	G	5'10"	170	Freshman	Chatsworth, CA	Transferred to UC Santa Barbara
D. J. Fenner	15	G	6'6"	205	Senior	Seattle, WA	Graduated
David Cunningham	20	G	6'4"	195	Sophomore	Sacramento, CA	Walk-on; left the team for personal reasons
John Carlson	34	F	6'8"	225	Sophomore	Reno, NV	Walk-on; didn't return

=== Incoming transfers ===
Name	Number	Pos.	Height	Weight	Year	Hometown	Previous school
Tre'Shawn Thurman	0	F	6'7"	230	Senior	Omaha, NE	Transferred from Omaha. Under NCAA transfer rules, Thurman will have to sit out for the 2017–18 season. Will have one year of remaining eligibility.
Nisre Zouzoua	5	G	6'2"	190	Junior	Brockton, MA	Transferred from Bryant. Under NCAA transfer rules, Zouzoua will have to sit out for the 2017–18 season. Will have two years of remaining eligibility.
Corey Henson	20	G	6'3"	175	Senior	Upper Marlboro, MD	Transferred from Wagner. Under NCAA transfer rules, Henson will have to sit out for the 2017–18 season. Will have one year of remaining eligibility.
Jazz Johnson	22	G	5'10"	200	Junior	Lake Oswego, OR	Transferred from Portland. Under NCAA transfer rules, Johnson will have to sit out for the 2017–18 season. Will have two years of remaining eligibility.

=== 2017 recruiting class ===
Nevada did not have any incoming players in the 2017 recruiting class.

=== 2018 recruiting class ===
College recruiting information (2018)
Name	Hometown	School	Height	Weight	Commit date
Jordan Brown; C	Roseville, CA	Prolific Prep	6 ft 10 in (2.08 m)	205 lb (93 kg)	May 11, 2018
Jordan Brown; C	Recruit ratings: Scout: Rivals: (89)				
K.J. Hymes; PF	Phoenix, AZ	Saint Mary's High School	6 ft 8 in (2.03 m)	193 lb (88 kg)	Sep 13, 2017
K.J. Hymes; PF	Recruit ratings: Scout: Rivals: (78)				
Vincent Lee; PF	Midlothian, TX	Midlothian High School	6 ft 7 in (2.01 m)	195 lb (88 kg)	Oct 22, 2017
Vincent Lee; PF	Recruit ratings: Scout: Rivals: (N/A)				
Overall recruit ranking: Scout: – Rivals: –
Note: In many cases, Scout, Rivals, 247Sports, On3, and ESPN may conflict in their listings of height and weight.; In these cases, the average was taken. ESPN grades are on a 100-point scale.; Sources: "2018 Team Ranking". Rivals.

== Preseason ==
In a vote by conference media at the Mountain West media day, the Wolf Pack were picked to win the Mountain West, receiving 19 of 24 first place votes. Junior forward Jordan Caroline was named to the preseason All-Mountain West team. Junior forward Caleb Martin, a transfer from NC State, was named the preseason Newcomer of the Year.

== Roster ==
2017–18 Nevada Wolf Pack men's basketball team
Players
Coaches

Pos.	#	Name	Height	Weight	Year	Previous school	Hometown
F	0	Tre'Shawn Thurman (I) (redshirt)	6 ft 7 in (2.01 m)	230 lb (104 kg)	Sr	Omaha Central HS; Omaha	Omaha, NE
G	1	Charlie Tooley (W)	6 ft 0 in (1.83 m)	190 lb (86 kg)	So	Granite Bay HS	Granite Bay, CA
G	3	John Jones (W)	6 ft 0 in (1.83 m)	165 lb (75 kg)	Fr	University Labaoratory	Baton Rouge, LA
C	4	Darien Williams	6 ft 8 in (2.03 m)	235 lb (107 kg)	Sr	St. John Bosco HS; St. John's	San Francisco, CA
G/F	5	Nisre Zouzoua (I) (redshirt)	6 ft 7 in (2.01 m)	210 lb (95 kg)	Jr	Boston Trinity Academy; Bryant	Brockton, MA
F	10	Caleb Martin	6 ft 7 in (2.01 m)	215 lb (98 kg)	RS Jr	Oak Hill Academy; NC State	Mocksville, NC
G/F	11	Cody Martin	6 ft 7 in (2.01 m)	210 lb (95 kg)	RS Jr	Oak Hill Academy; NC State	Mocksville, NC
F	12	Elijah Foster	6 ft 7 in (2.01 m)	240 lb (109 kg)	Sr	Rainier Beach HS	Seattle, WA
G	13	Hallice Cooke	6 ft 3 in (1.91 m)	190 lb (86 kg)	RS Sr	St. Anthony; Iowa State	Union City, NJ
G	14	Lindsey Drew	6 ft 4 in (1.93 m)	180 lb (82 kg)	Jr	Fairfax HS	Los Angeles, CA
G	20	Corey Henson (I) (redshirt)	6 ft 3 in (1.91 m)	175 lb (79 kg)	Sr	DeMatha Catholic HS; Wagner	Upper Marlboro, MD
G	21	Kendall Stephens	6 ft 7 in (2.01 m)	205 lb (93 kg)	RS Sr	St. Charles East HS; Purdue	St. Charles, IL
G	22	Jazz Johnson (I) (redshirt)	5 ft 10 in (1.78 m)	200 lb (91 kg)	RS Jr	Lake Oswego HS; Portland	Lake Oswego, OR
F	24	Jordan Caroline	6 ft 7 in (2.01 m)	235 lb (107 kg)	RS Jr	Montverde Academy; Southern Illinois	Champaign, IL
F	33	Josh Hall	6 ft 6 in (1.98 m)	190 lb (86 kg)	So	Montverde Academy	Detroit, MI

Head coach

- Eric Musselman (San Diego)

Assistant coach(es)

- Johnny Jones (LSU)
- Anthony Ruta (Arizona State)
- Gus Argenal (UC Davis)

Legend

- (C) Team captain
- (S) Suspended
- (I) Ineligible
- (W) Walk-on
- Injured
- Current redshirt

Roster
Last update: 10/4/2017

== Schedule and results ==
Date time, TV	Rank^{#}	Opponent^{#}	Result	Record	High points	High rebounds	High assists	Site (attendance) city, state
Exhibition
Oct 22, 2017*; 4:00 pm		Grand Canyon; Charity exhibition benefiting North Bay Fire Relief	W 81–72		22 – Caroline	8 – Caroline	8 – Cody Martin	Lawlor Events Center (3,072); Reno, NV
Oct 29, 2017*; 3:00 pm		Stanislaus State	W 100–83		35 – Stephens	10 – Hall	5 – Caleb Martin	Lawlor Events Center (7,032); Reno, NV
Nov 3, 2017*; 7:00 pm		Dominican	W 101–55		27 – Hall	10 – Foster	10 – Drew	Virginia Street Gym (1,581); Reno, NV
Non-conference regular season
Nov 10, 2017*; 7:00 pm		Idaho	W 88–64	1–0	26 – Caleb Martin	8 – Caroline	7 – Cody Martin	Lawlor Events Center (8,457); Reno, NV
Nov 13, 2017*; 8:30 pm, ESPNU		Rhode Island	W 88–81	2–0	28 – Caroline	12 – Caroline	3 – 2 tied	Lawlor Events Center (7,737); Reno, NV
Nov 15, 2017*; 7:00 pm		at Santa Clara	W 93–63	3–0	22 – Cody Martin	12 – Cody Martin	8 – Drew	Leavey Center (1,892); Santa Clara, CA
Nov 18, 2017*; 7:00 pm		at Pacific	W 79–66	4–0	25 – Hall	12 – Caroline	4 – Cody Martin	Alex G. Spanos Center (2,123); Stockton, CA
Nov 21, 2017*; 7:00 pm, ATTSNRM		Davidson	W 81–68	5–0	26 – Caleb Martin	9 – Caroline	9 – Drew	Lawlor Events Center (8,225); Reno, NV
Nov 24, 2017*; 10:00 pm		at Hawaii	W 67–54	6–0	22 – Caleb Martin	7 – Cody Martin	3 – Cody Martin	Stan Sheriff Center (6,309); Honolulu, HI
Nov 29, 2017*; 7:00 pm, Stadium		Illinois State; MW–MWC Challenge	W 98–68	7–0	21 – Caleb Martin	7 – 3 tied	7 – Cody Martin	Lawlor Events Center (8,293); Reno, NV
Dec 2, 2017*; 7:00 pm		at UC Irvine	W 76–65	8–0	24 – Caroline	13 – Caroline	4 – 2 tied	Bren Events Center (1,869); Irvine, CA
Dec 5, 2017*; 5:00 pm, FCS	No. 22	at Texas Tech	L 76–82 ^{OT}	8–1	28 – Caleb Martin	12 – Caroline	4 – Drew	United Supermarkets Arena (9,872); Lubbock, TX
Dec 8, 2017*; 10:00 pm, ESPNU	No. 22	vs. No. 20 TCU; Basketball Hall of Fame Classic	L 80–84	8–2	27 – Cody Martin	11 – Cody Martin	6 – Cody Martin	Staples Center (6,456); Los Angeles, CA
Dec 17, 2017*; 2:30 pm, ATTSNRM		Radford; Las Vegas Classic	W 77–62	9–2	25 – Caroline	15 – Caroline	5 – Hall	Lawlor Events Center (7,272); Reno, NV
Dec 19, 2017*; 7:00 pm, Stadium		UC Davis; Las Vegas Classic	W 88–73	10–2	22 – Caleb Martin	7 – Caroline	6 – Cody Martin	Lawlor Events Center (7,574); Reno, NV
Dec 22, 2017*; 8:00 pm, FS1		vs. Southern Illinois; Las Vegas Classic	W 86–64	11–2	19 – Caleb Martin	9 – Cody Martin	7 – Cody Martin	Orleans Arena; Paradise, NV
Dec 23, 2017*; 8:00 pm, FS1		vs. San Francisco; Las Vegas Classic	L 64–66	11–3	21 – Caleb Martin	8 – Drew	2 – 2 tied	Orleans Arena; Paradise, NV
Mountain West regular season
Dec 27, 2017; 7:00 pm, ESPN3		at Fresno State	W 80–65	12–3 (1–0)	19 – Stephens	10 – Caleb Martin	5 – Drew	Save Mart Center (6,008); Fresno, CA
Dec 30, 2017; 2:00 pm, ATTSNRM		New Mexico	W 77–74	13–3 (2–0)	24 – Caleb Martin	10 – Caroline	5 – Cody Martin	Lawlor Events Center (9,530); Reno, NV
Jan 3, 2018; 7:30 pm, CBSSN		Wyoming	W 92–83	14–3 (3–0)	22 – Cody Martin	16 – Caroline	5 – Drew	Lawlor Events Center (9,188); Reno, NV
Jan 6, 2018; 11:00 am, ATTSNRM		at Air Force	W 86–75	15–3 (4–0)	23 – Caleb Martin	8 – 2 tied	5 – Drew	Clune Arena (2,254); Colorado Springs, CO
Jan 13, 2018; 5:00 pm, ESPN3		Utah State	W 83–57	16–3 (5–0)	19 – Stephens	9 – Caleb Martin	7 – Drew	Lawlor Events Center (9,976); Reno, NV
Jan 17, 2018; 7:30 pm, CBSSN		at San Jose State	W 71–54	17–3 (6–0)	24 – Caleb Martin	7 – Hall	4 – Caleb Martin	Event Center Arena (1,738); San Jose, CA
Jan 20, 2018; 7:00 pm, ESPN2		Boise State	W 74–68	18–3 (7–0)	28 – Caleb Martin	13 – Caroline	9 – Drew	Lawlor Events Center (11,164); Reno, NV
Jan 24, 2018; 8:00 pm, ESPNU	No. 23	at Wyoming	L 103–104 ^{2OT}	18–4 (7–1)	29 – Caroline	9 – Caroline	6 – Cody Martin	Arena-Auditorium (5,016); Laramie, WY
Jan 31, 2018; 8:00 pm, CBSSN		Fresno State	W 102–92	19–4 (8–1)	22 – Cody Martin	7 – 2 tied	6 – 2 tied	Lawlor Events Center (8,521); Reno, NV
Feb 3, 2018; 5:00 pm, ESPNU		at Colorado State	W 76–67	20–4 (9–1)	26 – Caleb Martin	8 – 2 tied	3 – Caroline	Moby Arena (3,978); Fort Collins, CO
Feb 7, 2018; 8:00 pm, CBSSN	No. 23	UNLV	L 78–86	20–5 (9–2)	18 – Caroline	8 – Drew	5 – Cody Martin	Lawlor Events Center (11,285); Reno, NV
Feb 10, 2018; 5:00 pm, ESPN2	No. 23	San Diego State	W 83–58	21–5 (10–2)	26 – Caroline	11 – 2 tied	9 – Drew	Lawlor Events Center (10,134); Reno, NV
Feb 14, 2018; 8:00 pm, ESPNU	No. 24	at Boise State	W 77–72	22–5 (11–2)	21 – 2 tied	10 – Caroline	3 – 2 tied	Taco Bell Arena (8,611); Boise, ID
Feb 17, 2018; 3:00 pm, CBSSN	No. 24	at Utah State	W 93–87	23–5 (12–2)	30 – Cody Martin	9 – Cody Martin	5 – Cooke	Smith Spectrum (5,796); Logan, UT
Feb 21, 2018; 7:00 pm, ESPN3	No. 20	San Jose State	W 80–67	24–5 (13–2)	30 – Stephens	10 – Cody Martin	7 – 2 tied	Lawlor Events Center (8,096); Reno, NV
Feb 25, 2018; 1:00 pm, CBSSN	No. 20	Colorado State	W 92–83	25–5 (14–2)	25 – Caleb Martin	14 – Caroline	11 – Cody Martin	Lawlor Events Center (10,273); Reno, NV
Feb 28, 2018; 8:00 pm, CBSSN	No. 21	at UNLV	W 101–75	26–5 (15–2)	24 – Cody Martin	9 – Cody Martin	7 – Cody Martin	Thomas & Mack Center (13,998); Paradise, NV
Mar 3, 2018; 7:00 pm, CBSSN	No. 21	at San Diego State	L 74–79	26–6 (15–3)	29 – Caroline	9 – Caleb Martin	6 – Cody Martin	Viejas Arena (12,414); San Diego, CA
Mountain West tournament
Mar 8, 2018; 12:00 pm, CBSSN	(1) No. 22	at (8) UNLV; Quarterfinals	W 79–74	27–6	21 – Caroline	10 – Caroline	6 – Cody Martin	Thomas & Mack Center (6,753); Paradise, NV
Mar 9, 2018; 6:00 pm, CBSSN	(1) No. 22	vs. (5) San Diego State; Semifinals	L 73–90	27–7	25 – Caroline	10 – Caroline	8 – Cody Martin	Thomas & Mack Center (8,456); Paradise, NV
NCAA tournament
Mar 16, 2018*; 1:30 pm, TBS	(7 S) No. 24	vs. (10 S) Texas; First Round	W 87–83 ^{OT}	28–7	22 – Stephens	10 – Caleb Martin	6 – Cody Martin	Bridgestone Arena (17,552); Nashville, TN
Mar 17, 2018*; 6:10 pm, TNT	(7 S) No. 24	vs. (2 S) No. 6 Cincinnati; Second Round	W 75–73	29–7	25 – Cody Martin	7 – Caroline	7 – Cody Martin	Bridgestone Arena (17,552); Nashville, TN
Mar 22, 2018*; 4:00 pm, CBS	(7 S) No. 24	vs. (11 S) Loyola–Chicago; Sweet Sixteen	L 68–69	29–8	21 – Caleb Martin	6 – Caroline	5 – Cody Martin	Philips Arena (15,616); Atlanta, GA
*Non-conference game. (#) Tournament seedings in parentheses. S=South Region Source. All times are in Pacific Time.

== Ranking movement ==
Ranking movements Legend: ██ Increase in ranking ██ Decrease in ranking — = Not ranked RV = Received votes
	Week																			
Poll	Pre	1	2	3	4	5	6	7	8	9	10	11	12	13	14	15	16	17	18	Final
AP	RV	RV	RV	RV	RV	22	RV	RV	RV	RV	RV	23	RV	23	24	20	21	22	24	Not released
Coaches	RV	RV^	RV	RV	RV	24	RV	—	RV	RV	RV	RV	RV	23	24	22	21	22	25	20

^Coaches Poll did not release a Week 2 poll at the same time AP did.
*AP does not release post-NCAA tournament rankings. Number in parentheses indicates number of first place votes.
