= Ben Richardson (basketball) =

American basketball player (born 1996)

Personal information
- Born: February 26, 1996 (age 30) Overland Park, Kansas, U.S.
- Listed height: 6 ft 3 in (1.91 m)
- Listed weight: 195 lb (88 kg)

Career information
- High school: Blue Valley Northwest (Overland Park, Kansas)
- College: Loyola Chicago (2014–2018)
- NBA draft: 2018: undrafted
- Playing career: 2018–2022
- Position: Point guard / shooting guard

Career history
- 2018–2019: MKS Dąbrowa Górnicza
- 2019–2020: Geosan Kolín
- 2020–2021: SAM Basket
- 2021-2022: Spišskí Rytieri

Career highlights
- MVC Defensive Player of the Year (2018); MVC All-Defensive Team (2018)

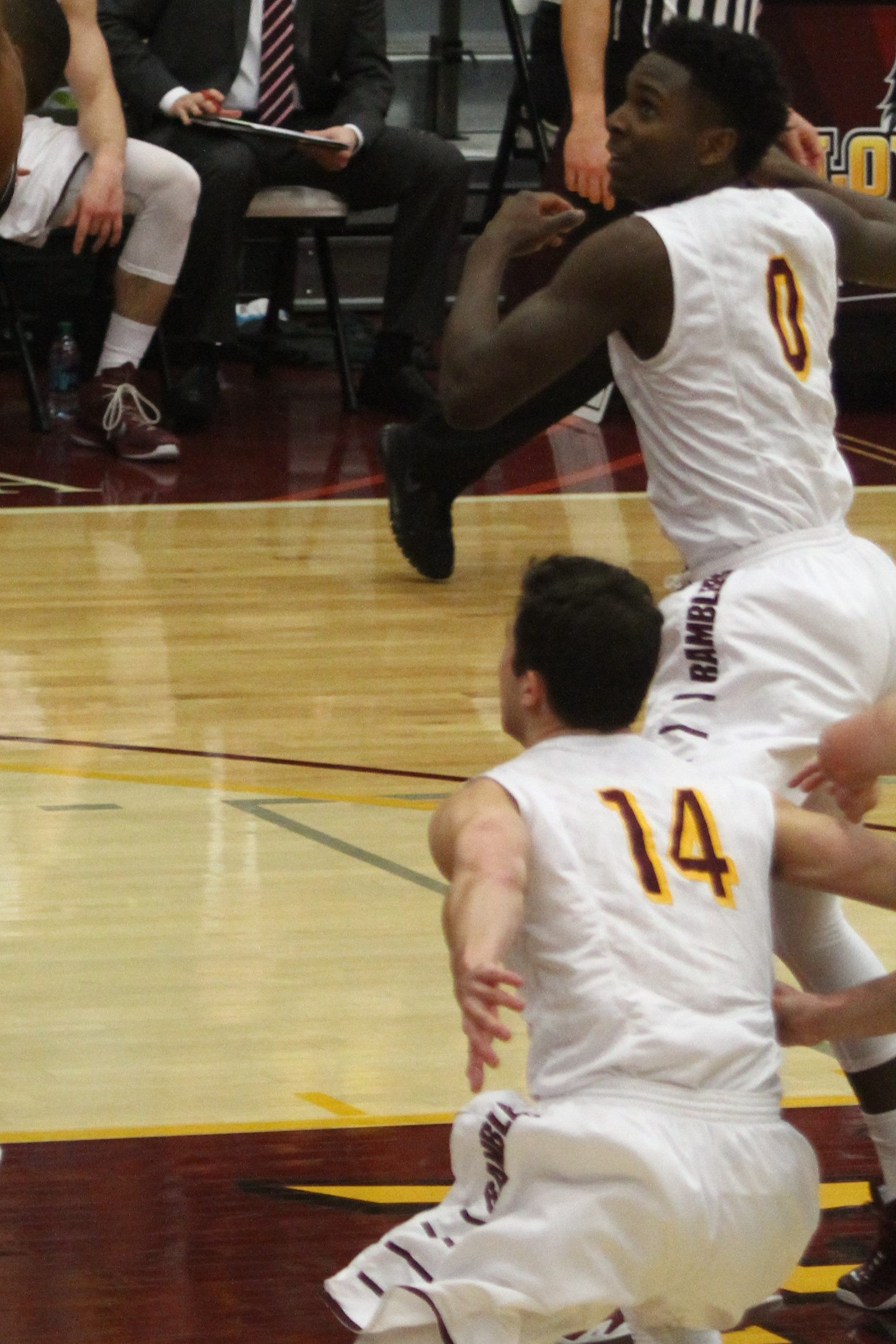

Ben Richardson (born February 26, 1996) is an American former professional basketball player. He spent four seasons with the Loyola Ramblers at the college level, winning Missouri Valley Conference (MVC) Defensive Player of the Year as a senior. In his final season at Loyola, he also helped his team reach the Final Four round of the 2018 NCAA Division I tournament. Richardson played professionally for four teams in Europe.

== Early life ==
From an early age, Richardson played youth basketball under the coaching of his father and Ed Fritz, who was also head coach for Blue Valley Northwest High School in Overland Park, Kansas. In third grade, he began playing with Clayton Custer, whom he met in first grade and would become his future high school and college teammate. In the following year, Richardson helped his youth team win the United States Specialty Sports Association national championship with Custer, and when he was in sixth grade, they won it a second time. For many years of his childhood, Richardson took part in Amateur Athletic Union (AAU) tournaments and summer leagues.

== High school career ==
Richardson played four years of basketball for Blue Valley Northwest High School, finishing with an overall record of 94–6. In all four seasons of high school, he helped his team reach the Kansas Class 6A State Championship game, winning two consecutive titles in his final two years. As a junior, he averaged 12.8 points, 4.0 rebounds, and 3.8 assists per game, and as a senior, he averaged 11.4 points per game, earning first-team All-State honors in both seasons. Richardson was deemed a three-star recruit by recruiting service Rivals but was not rated by ESPN or 247Sports. He gained limited interest from major NCAA Division I programs, primarily receiving offers from mid-major colleges like Indiana State and UMass. He committed to play for Loyola (Illinois) on September 29, 2013 under head coach Porter Moser.

== College career ==
As a freshman for Loyola in the 2014–15 season, Richardson averaged 4.2 points, shooting .381 from the field, in 20 minutes per game. His best game of the season was a season-high 15 points, going 5-of-5 from the three-point line, in a win over Indiana State at the 2015 Missouri Valley Conference tournament quarterfinals. He accumulated a team-high 33 steals. In his sophomore campaign, Richardson averaged 4.9 points, with a .402 field goal percentage, in 23.8 minutes per game. He was named to the Honorable Mention Missouri Valley Conference (MVC) Scholar-Athlete Team and made the MVC Honor Roll. He scored a season-best 21 points against Toledo at the Great Alaska Shootout on November 27, 2015, shooting 7-of-8 from the field.

Richardson averaged a career-high 8.3 points, 2.9 assists, and 1.3 steals in 31.8 minutes per game in his junior season, starting in all 32 games. He garnered First Team MVC Scholar-Athlete Team honors, being named MVC Scholar-Athlete of the Week on January 10, 2017. Richardson posted season-bests of 22 points and 8 assists on December 29, 2016 in a loss to Drake. As a senior, he averaged 6.9 points, 3.8 assists, and 1.2 steals in 31 minutes per game, en route to MVC Defensive Player of the Year and All-Defensive Team accolades. On March 24, 2018 against Kansas State, he scored a career-high 23 points, shooting 6-of-7 from the three-point line, to lead Loyola to the Final Four of the 2018 NCAA tournament. Richardson was named MVC First Team Scholar-Athlete and to the Division I-AAA Scholar-Athlete Team. Along with Loyola teammate Clayton Custer, he also won the Kansas City Sports Commission Sportsmen Of The Year award.

== Professional career ==
On July 20, 2018, Richardson signed a contract with MKS Dąbrowa Górnicza of the Polish Basketball League (PLK). He averaged 8.7 points, 3.0 rebounds, 2.8 assists and 1.5 steals per game. He spent the 2019-20 season in the Czech Republic with Geosan Kolín. Richardson averaged 12.2 points, 3.7 rebounds, 3.0 assists and 2.1 steals per game. On October 6, 2020, he signed with SAM Basket of the Swiss Basketball League. He then played for Spišskí Rytieri of the Slovak Basketball League.

== Personal life ==
As of 2023, Richardson was working for an insurance company in Overland Park, Kansas.
