= Kacie McDonnell =

American television host

- Born: July 30, 1990 (age 36); Pottsville, Pennsylvania
- Other names: Kacie Hosmer, Kacie McDonnell-Hosmer
- Education: Villanova University
- Employer: Fox News
- Spouse: Eric Hosmer (m. 2021)
- Children: 1

Kacie McDonnell (born July 30, 1990) is a Fox News talent, mostly on Fox Business as host of Mansion Global. Her first assignment was hosting the red carpet in the Patriot Awards in 2019.

== Early life and education ==
She was born and raised in Pottsville, Pennsylvania. She went to Nativity BVM High School then Villanova University where she graduated in 2012 with a bachelor's degree in communications.

== Career ==
Prior to joining Fox News, McDonnell began her career in sports at WTXF-TV, delivering reports on the Philadelphia Eagles for Good Day Philadelphia. She also was the traffic reporter there. McDonnell then spent two years at KSHB-TV in Kansas City, Missouri where she started as a traffic reporter and then began working as a sideline reporter for Sporting Kansas City about a year later. McDonnell served as an anchor for the New England Sports Network covering professional sports across Boston. She covered the Final four for Turner Sports when her alma mater Villanova University played in and later won two NCAA men's Division I national championships in 2016 and 2018.

== Personal life ==
McDonnell began dating NFL quarterback Aaron Murray in 2013. They became engaged in 2014, before calling it off the following year.

She married Major League Baseball player Eric Hosmer on December 31, 2021. She has taken her husband's name in her social media pages. The couple announced in April 2022 that they were expecting their first child later that year.
