= Clayton Custer =

American basketball player (born 1995)

Oklahoma Sooners
- Title: Assistant coach
- Conference: Southeastern Conference

Personal information
- Born: June 28, 1995 (age 31) Kansas City, Kansas, U.S.
- Listed height: 6 ft 1 in (1.85 m)
- Listed weight: 185 lb (84 kg)

Career information
- High school: Blue Valley Northwest (Overland Park, Kansas)
- College: Iowa State (2014–2015); Loyola Chicago (2016–2019)
- NBA draft: 2019: undrafted
- Position: Point guard
- Number: 13
- Coaching career: 2020–present

Career history

Playing
- 2019: Śląsk Wroclaw

Coaching
- 2020–2021: Loyola Chicago (player development)
- 2021–2023: Oklahoma (player development)
- 2023–present: Oklahoma (assistant)

Career highlights
- Lou Henson Award (2018); MVC Player of the Year (2018); First-team All-MVC (2018); Third-team All-MVC (2019)

Clayton Custer (born June 28, 1995) is an American former basketball player and current assistant coach for the Oklahoma Sooners. A 6 ft 1 in (1.85 m) point guard, he played college basketball for Loyola University Chicago, and was the 2018 Missouri Valley Conference Player of the Year. Custer briefly played professional basketball for Śląsk Wroclaw of the Polish Basketball League.

== High school career ==
Custer played high school basketball at Blue Valley Northwest High School in Overland Park, Kansas, where he and future Loyola teammate Ben Richardson led the team to back-to-back state championships. Custer ultimately committed early to play for coach Fred Hoiberg at Iowa State. He also received offers from Oklahoma State and Kansas State, and Kansas coach Bill Self told him he was good enough to play for the Jayhawks but they had too many guards at that moment.

== College career ==
As a freshman in the 2014–15 season, Custer played sparingly behind the Cyclones' Monté Morris, one of the top point guards in the Big 12 Conference. Custer chose to transfer following the season, after scoring 13 points in 12 games. He ultimately re-joined Richardson under coach Porter Moser at Loyola after Moser took him to lunch and met with his parents. After sitting out the 2015–16 season per National Collegiate Athletic Association (NCAA) transfer rules, Custer immediately joined the Ramblers' starting lineup, allowing star Milton Doyle to play off the ball. Custer averaged 11.6 points and 3.1 assists per game as a sophomore.

As a redshirt junior, Custer led the Ramblers to the Missouri Valley Conference regular-season title, despite missing five games to an ankle injury. Custer was named the MVC Player of the Year. Following a run through the 2018 MVC tournament, Custer and the Ramblers entered the 2018 NCAA Tournament as an 11 seed. After a first-round win over the Miami Hurricanes, Custer led the team to a 63–62 second-round win over Tennessee. Custer hit the game-winner with 3.7 seconds left to advance the Ramblers to the Sweet 16. He ended up leading the Ramblers to the Final Four while averaging 13.2 points and 4.2 assists per game. At the close of the 2017–18 season, Custer was awarded the Lou Henson Award for top mid-major player in the country.

== Professional career ==
After going undrafted in the 2019 NBA draft, Custer signed a professional contract with Śląsk Wroclaw of the Polish Basketball League. He received limited playing time, and his contract was bought out midway through the season.

== Coaching career ==
Following his playing career, Custer became the Director of Player Development for Loyola's men's team. After serving in that role for one season, Custer followed head coach Porter Moser to Oklahoma to become their Director of Video Operations & Player Development.
