= 2017 McDonald's All-American Boys Game =

American high school basketball game

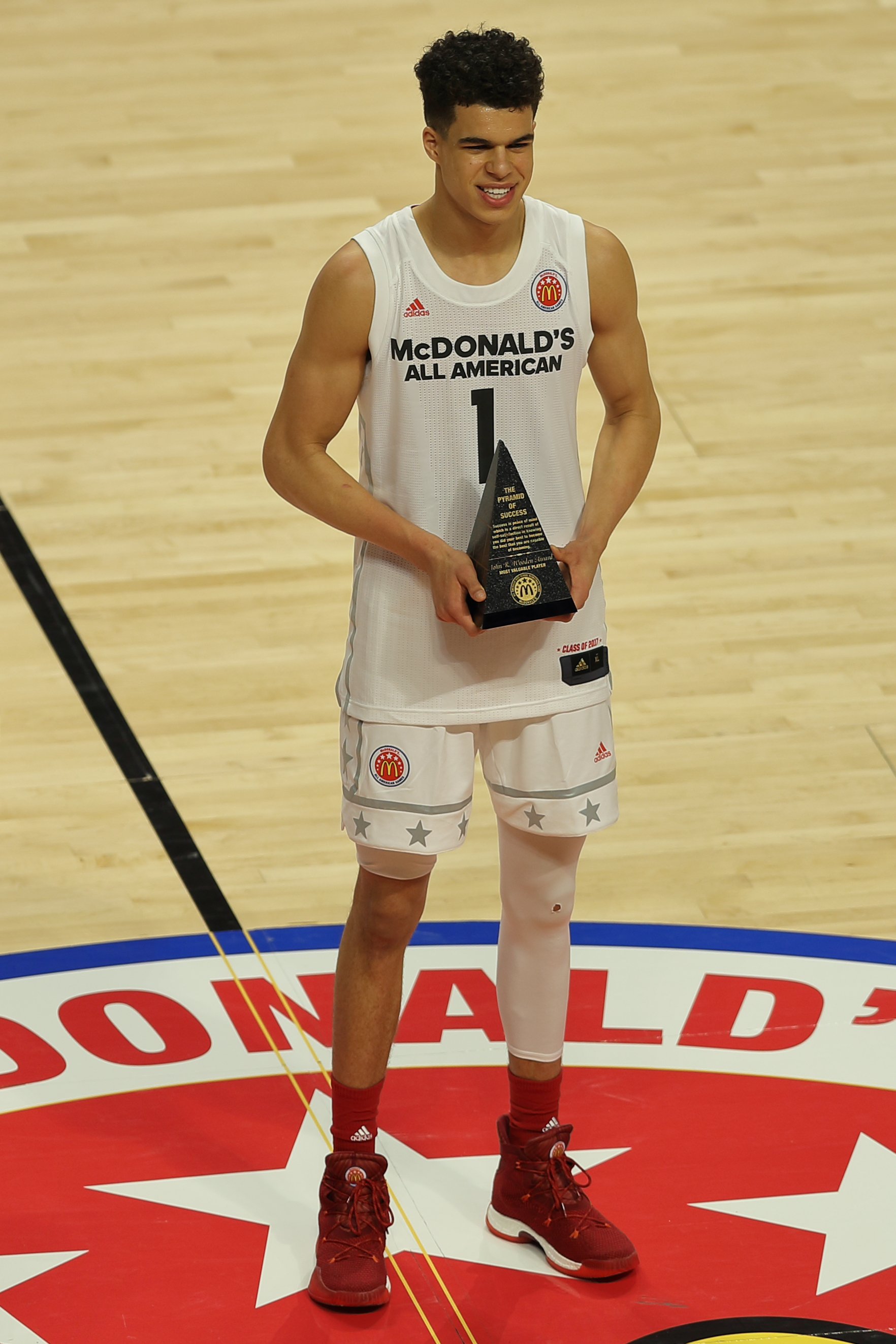
- Michael Porter Jr. earned the Most Valuable Player award.
| East | West |
|---|---|
| 107 | 109 |
| | 1st half | 2nd half | Total |
|---|---|---|---|
| East | 56 | 51 | 107 |
| West | 50 | 59 | 109 |
- Date: March 29, 2017
- Venue: United Center, Chicago, Illinois
- MVP: Michael Porter Jr.
- Network: ESPN

McDonald's All-American

The 2017 McDonald's All-American Boys Game was an All-star basketball game that was played on Wednesday, March 29, 2017 at the United Center in Chicago, Illinois, home of the Chicago Bulls. The game's rosters features the best and most highly recruited high school boys graduating in 2017. The game was the 40th annual version of the McDonald's All-American Game first played in 1977.

The 24 players are selected from 2,500 nominees by a committee of basketball experts. They are chosen not only for their on-court skills but for their performances off the court as well.

== Rosters ==
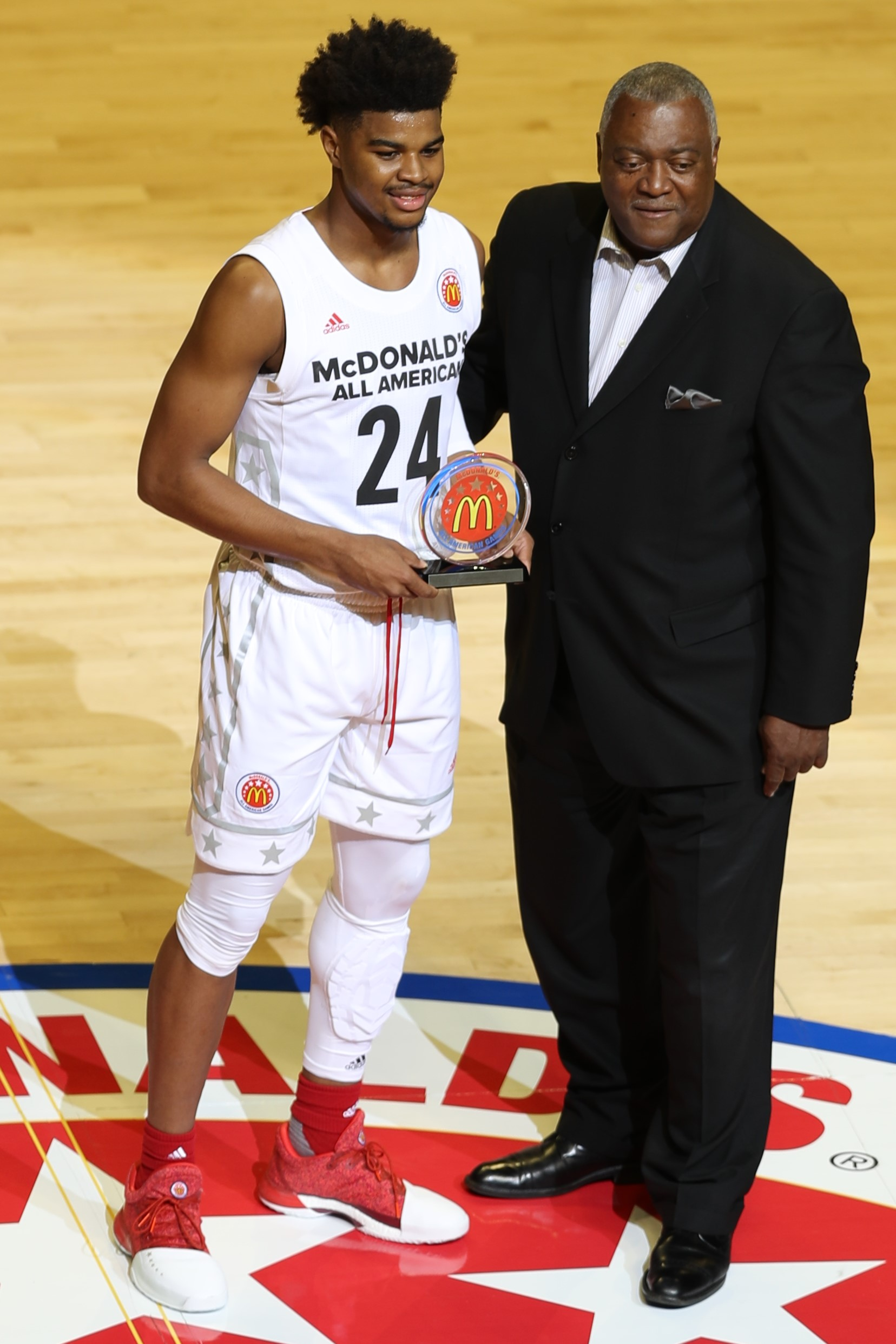
M. J. Walker won the Jack Daly Award.

When the rosters were announced on January 15, 2017, Kentucky had four selectees, while Duke and UCLA both had two. On the eve of the game, March 28, 2017, six players remained undecided. Of these six, four would choose their school within the next two months—Mo Bamba committed to Texas under coach Shaka Smart, Brandon McCoy elected to play for UNLV, Trevon Duval chose Duke, and Kevin Knox decided to join Kentucky.

Michael Porter Jr. earned the MVP award after leading his Team West to a close win with 17 points. Originally committed to the University of Washington, he decommitted after the firing of head coach Lorenzo Romar and instead chose to represent his home state by playing for the University of Missouri.

=== Team East ===
| ESPN 100 Rank | Name | Height (ft-in) | Weight (lb) | Position | Hometown | High school | College choice |
|---|---|---|---|---|---|---|---|
| 5 | Mo Bamba | 7-0 | 215 | C/PF | Harlem, New York | Westtown School | Texas^^{~} |
| 3 | Wendell Carter Jr. | 6-10 | 262 | PF/C | Atlanta, Georgia | Pace Academy | Duke |
| 4 | Trevon Duval | 6-2 | 175 | PG | Queens, New York | IMG Academy | Duke^^{~} |
| 22 | Quade Green | 6-0 | 170 | PG | Philadelphia, Pennsylvania | Neumann Goretti High School | Kentucky |
| 7 | Kevin Knox | 6-9 | 205 | SF | Tampa, Florida | Tampa Catholic High School | Kentucky^^{~} |
| 11 | Nick Richards | 6-11 | 220 | C | Elizabeth, New Jersey | St. Patrick High School | Kentucky |
| 9 | Mitchell Robinson | 7-1 | 230 | C | Chalmette, Louisiana | Chalmette High School | Western Kentucky† |
| 10 | Collin Sexton | 6-2 | 182 | SG | Mableton, Georgia | Pebblebrook High School | Alabama |
| 18 | Lonnie Walker IV | 6-5 | 210 | PG/SG | Reading, Pennsylvania | Reading Senior High School | Miami |
| 14 | P. J. Washington | 6-8 | 230 | SF/PF | Dallas, Texas | Findlay Prep | Kentucky |
| 13 | Kris Wilkes | 6-8 | 168 | SF/PF | Indianapolis, Indiana | North Central High School | UCLA |
| 23 | Jarred Vanderbilt | 6-9 | 213 | SF | Houston, Texas | Victory Prep School | Kentucky |

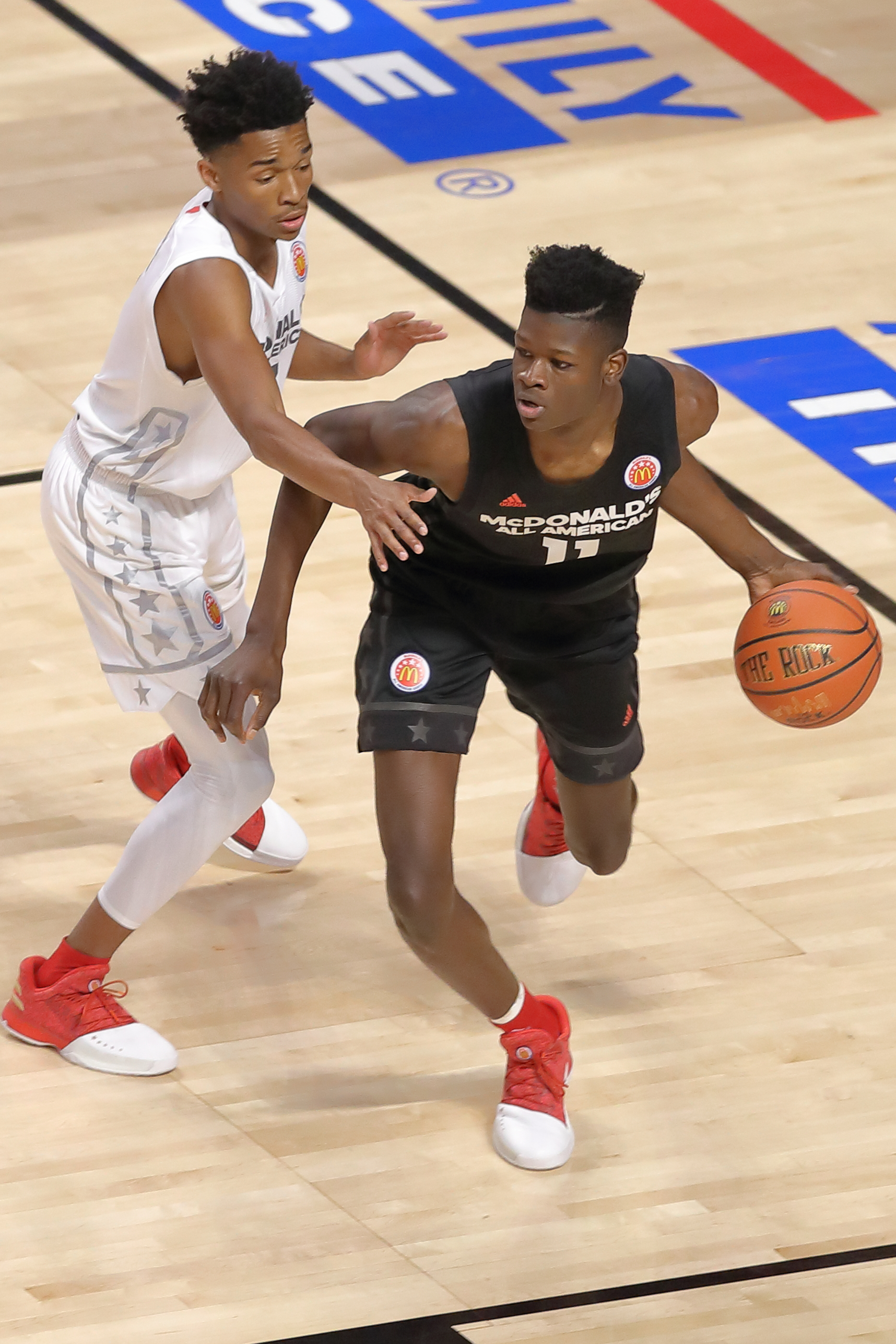
Mo Bamba

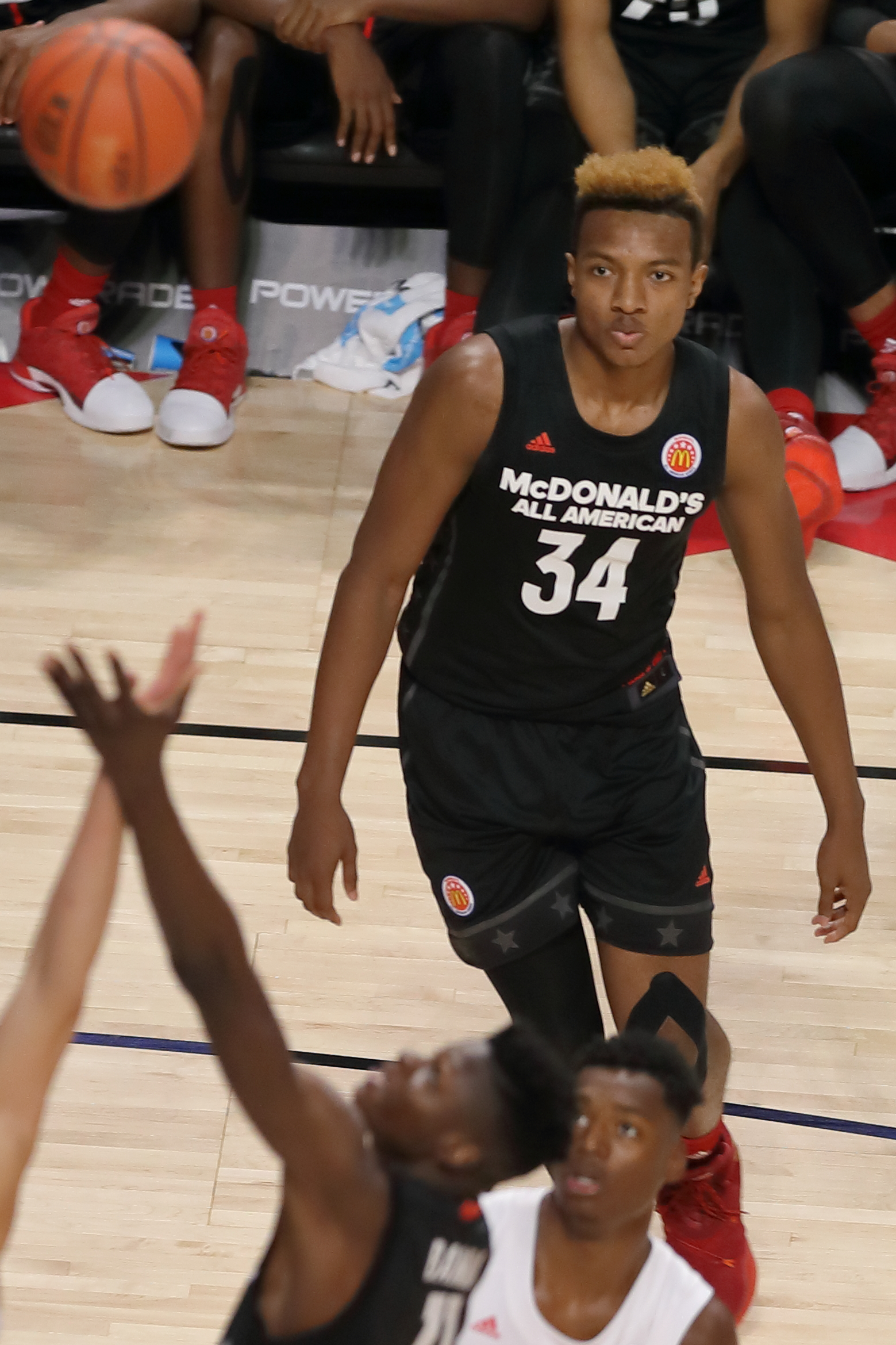
Wendell Carter Jr.

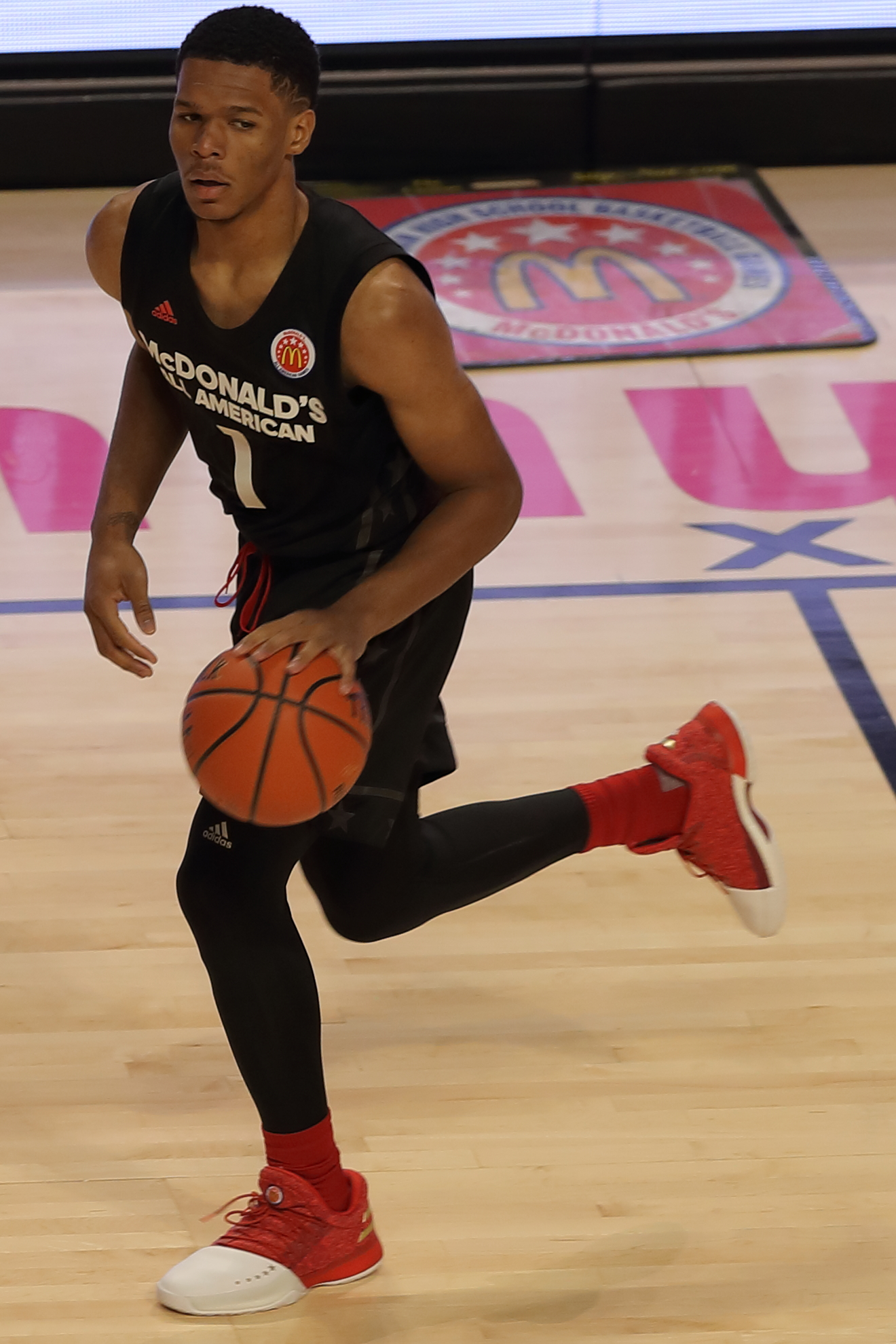
Trevon Duval

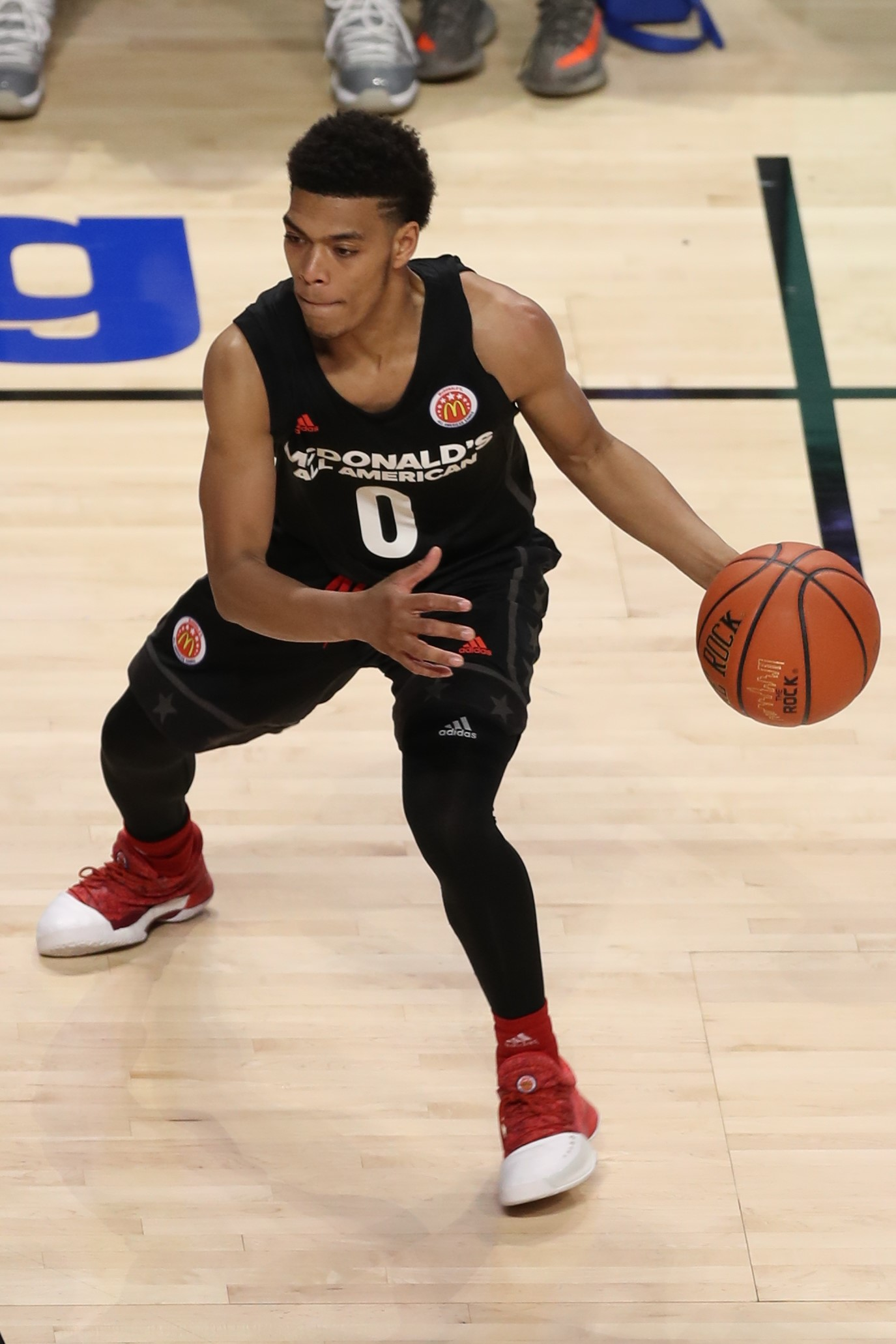
Quade Green

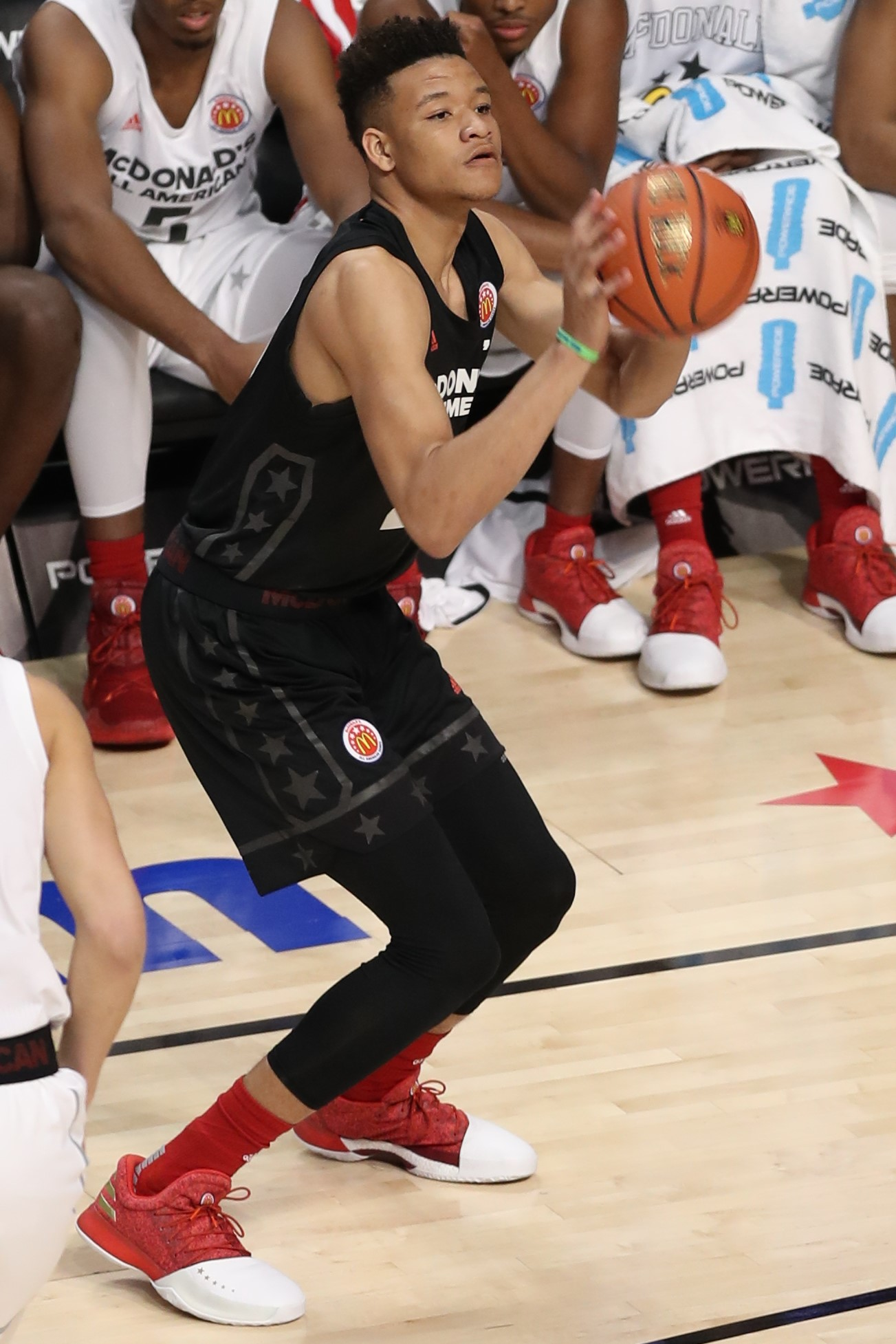
Kevin Knox

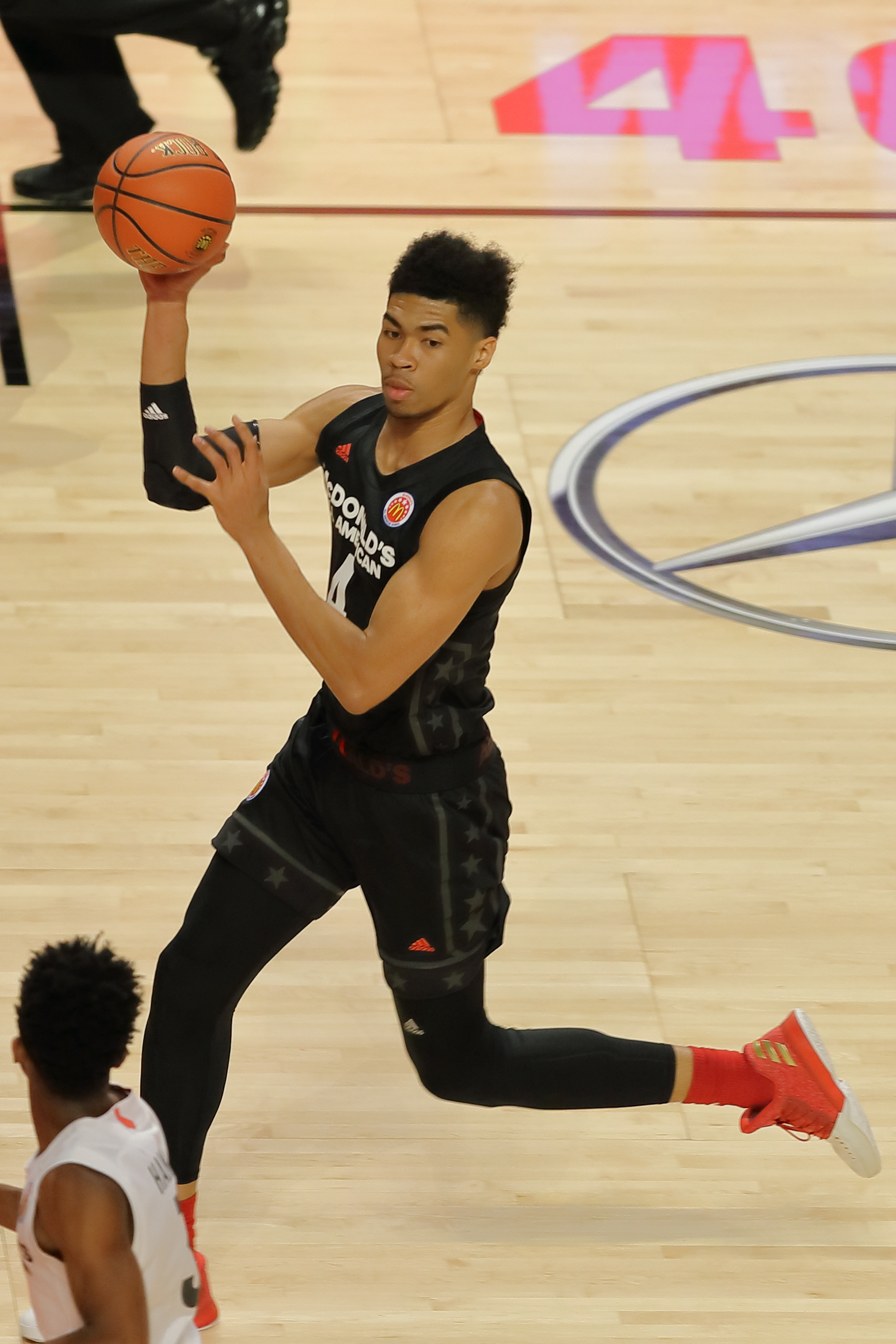
Nick Richards

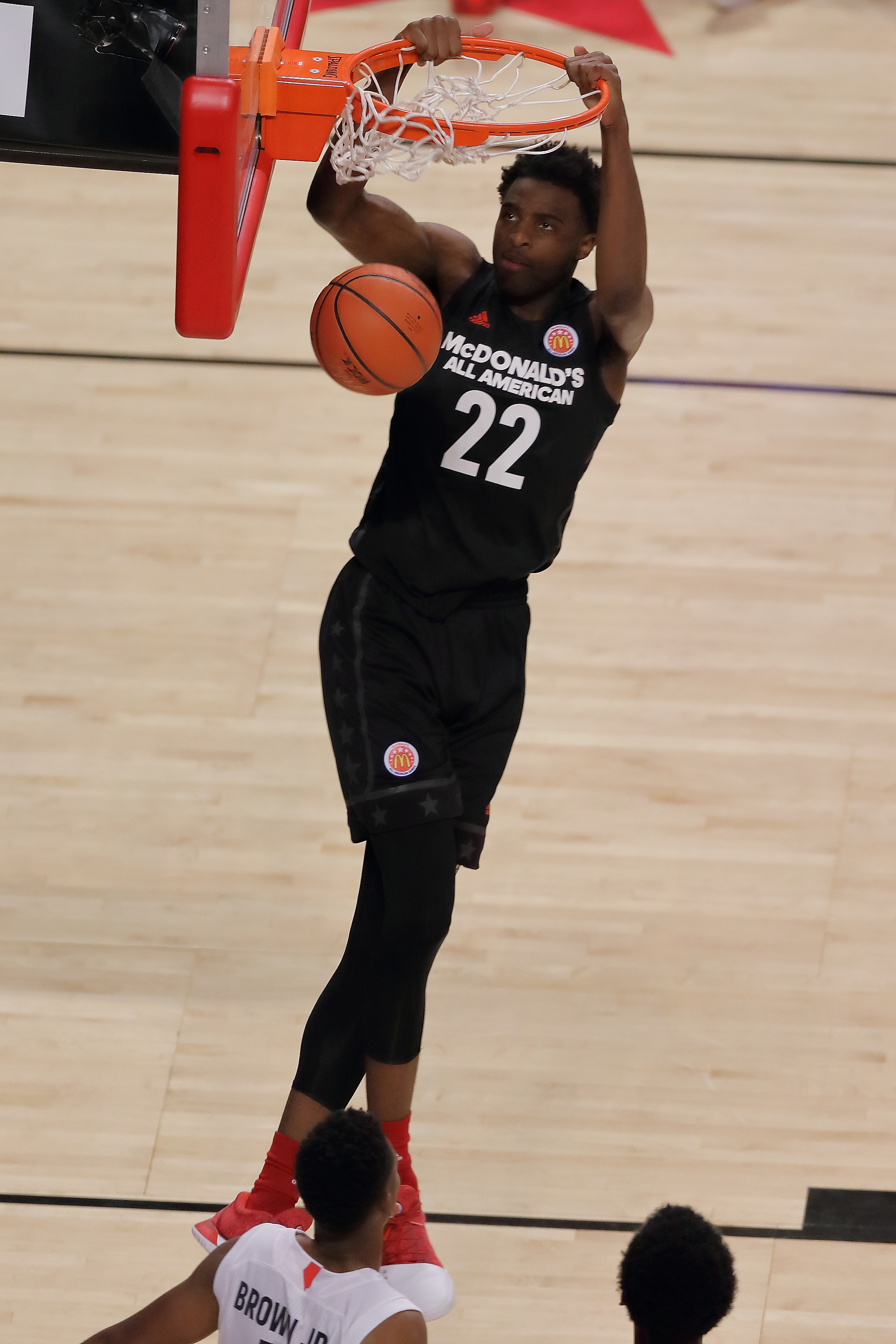
Mitchell Robinson

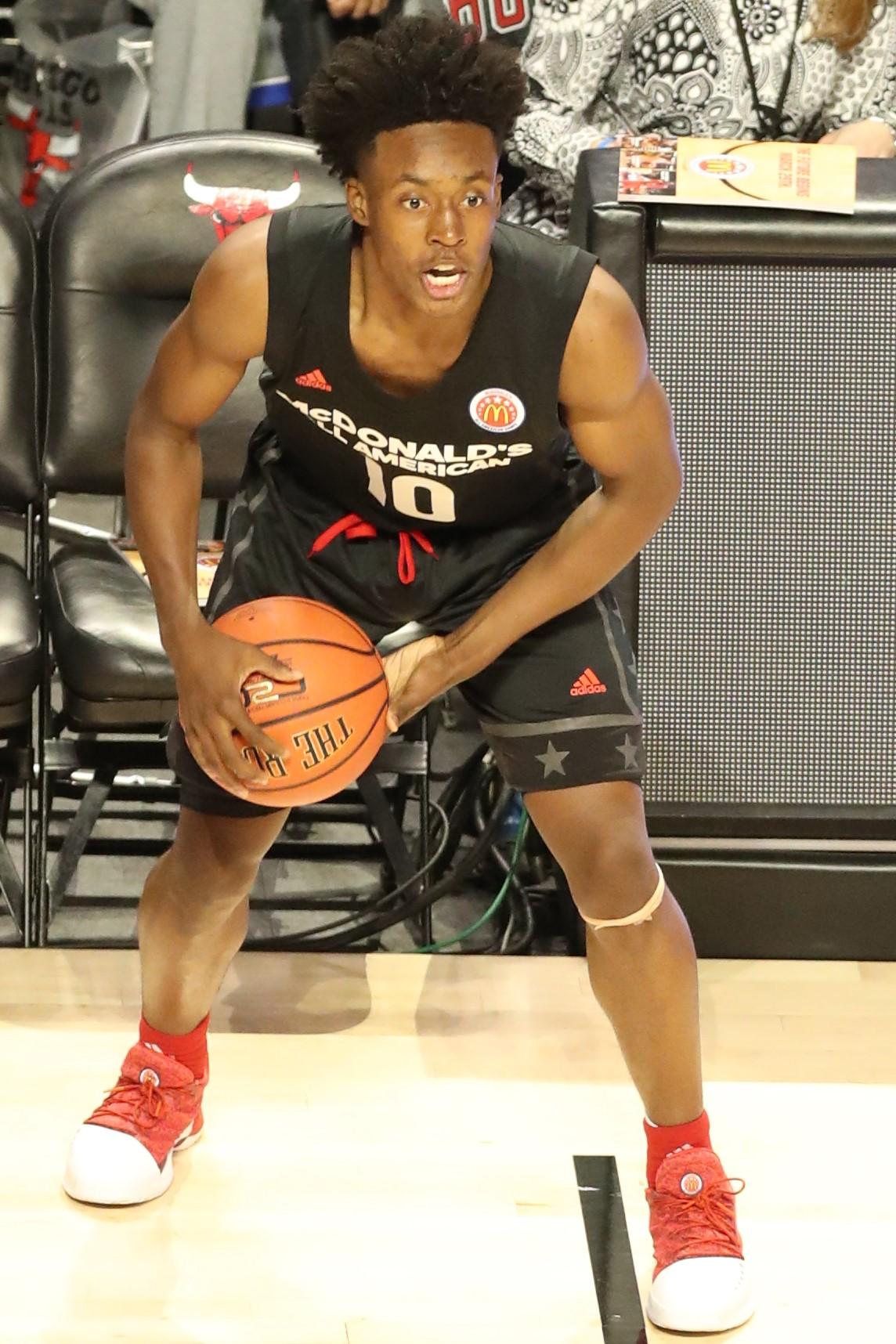
Collin Sexton

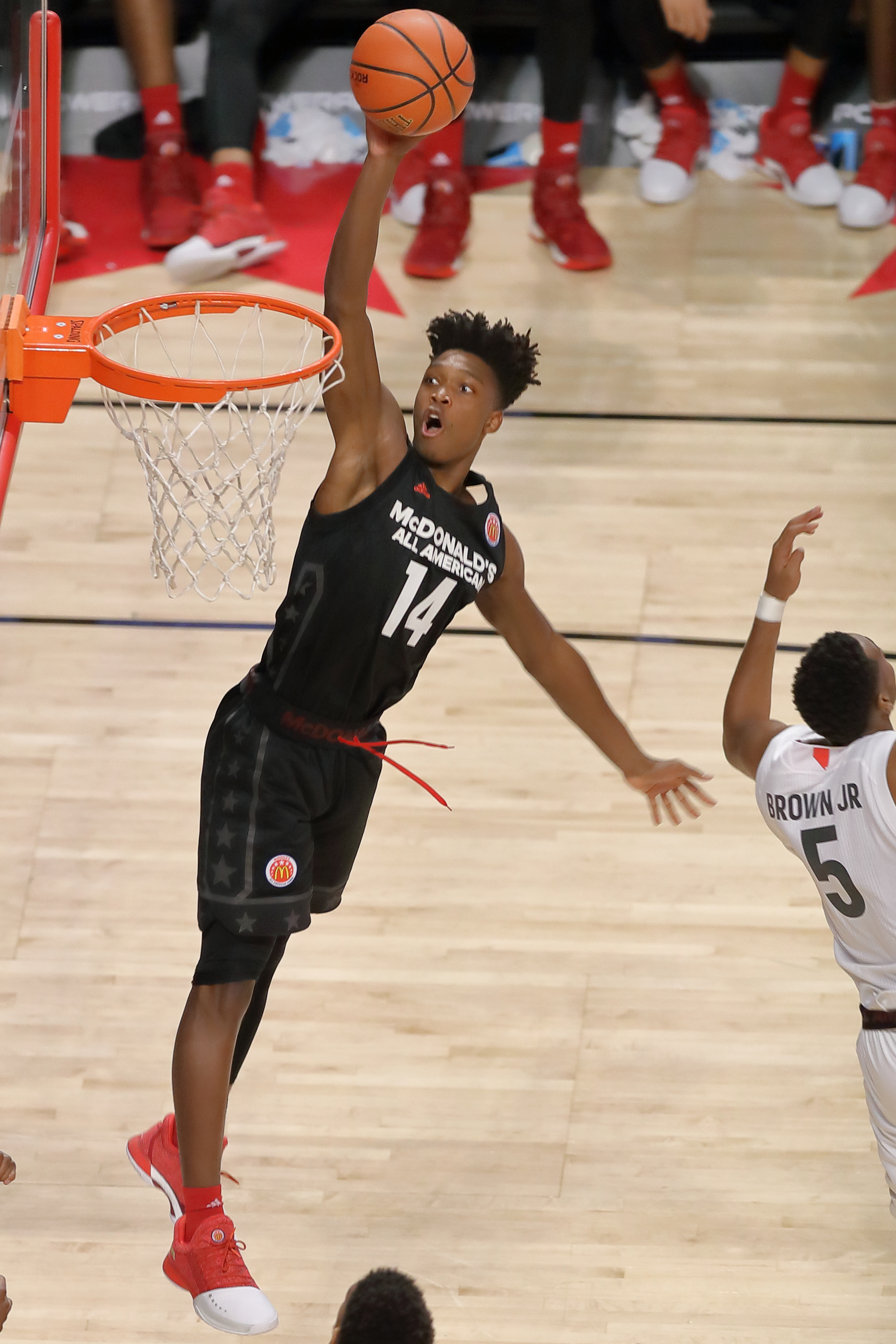
Lonnie Walker IV

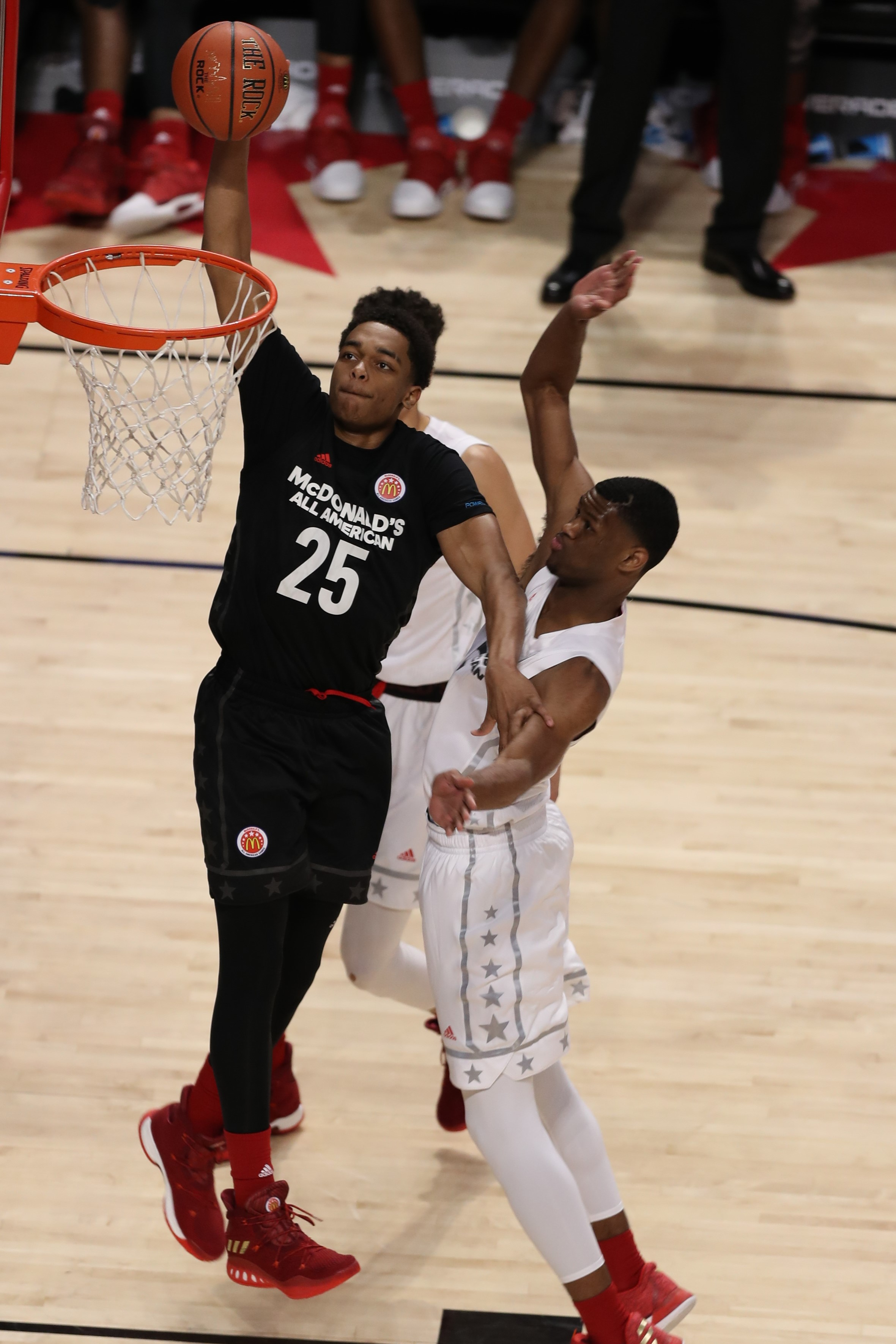
P. J. Washington

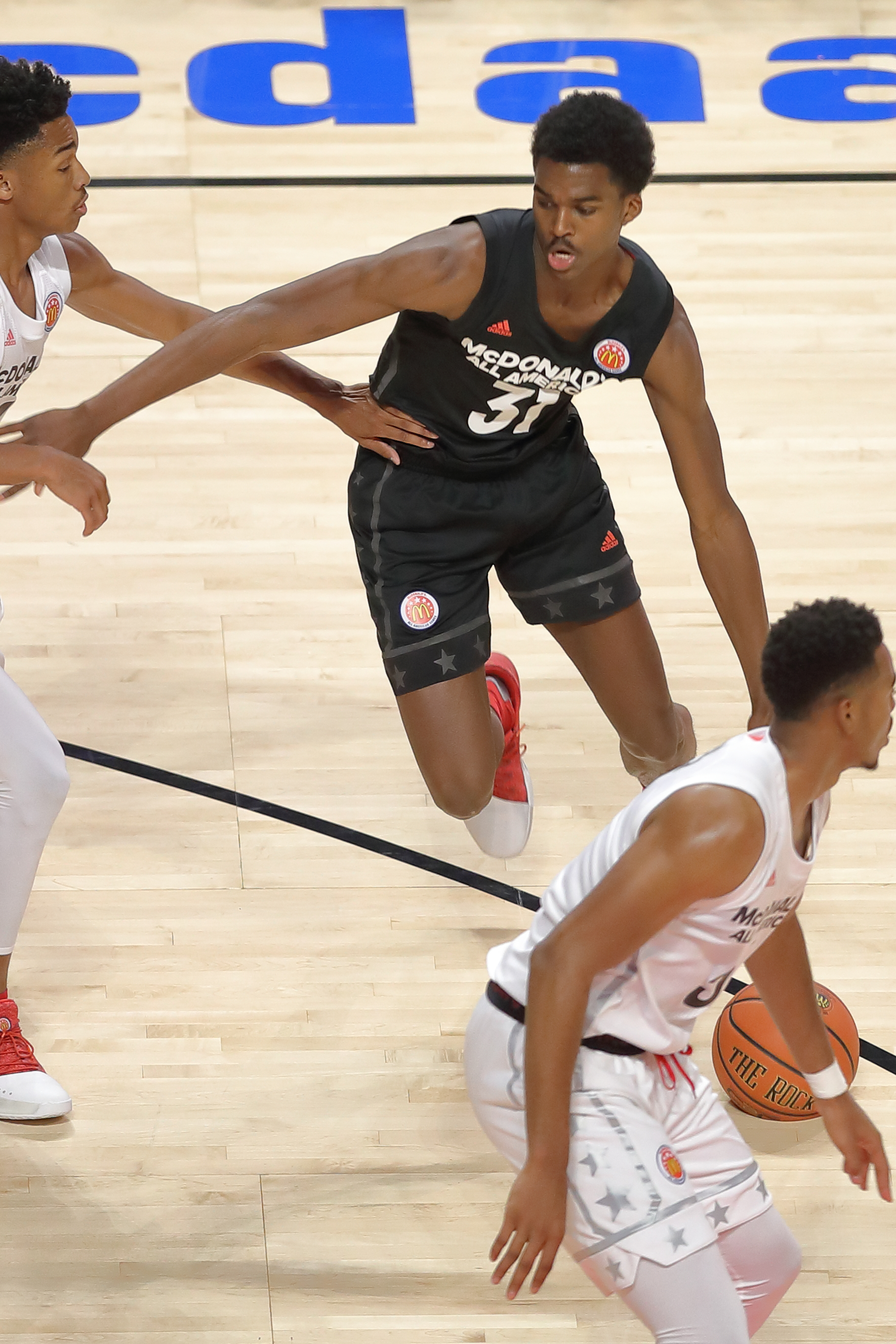
Kris Wilkes

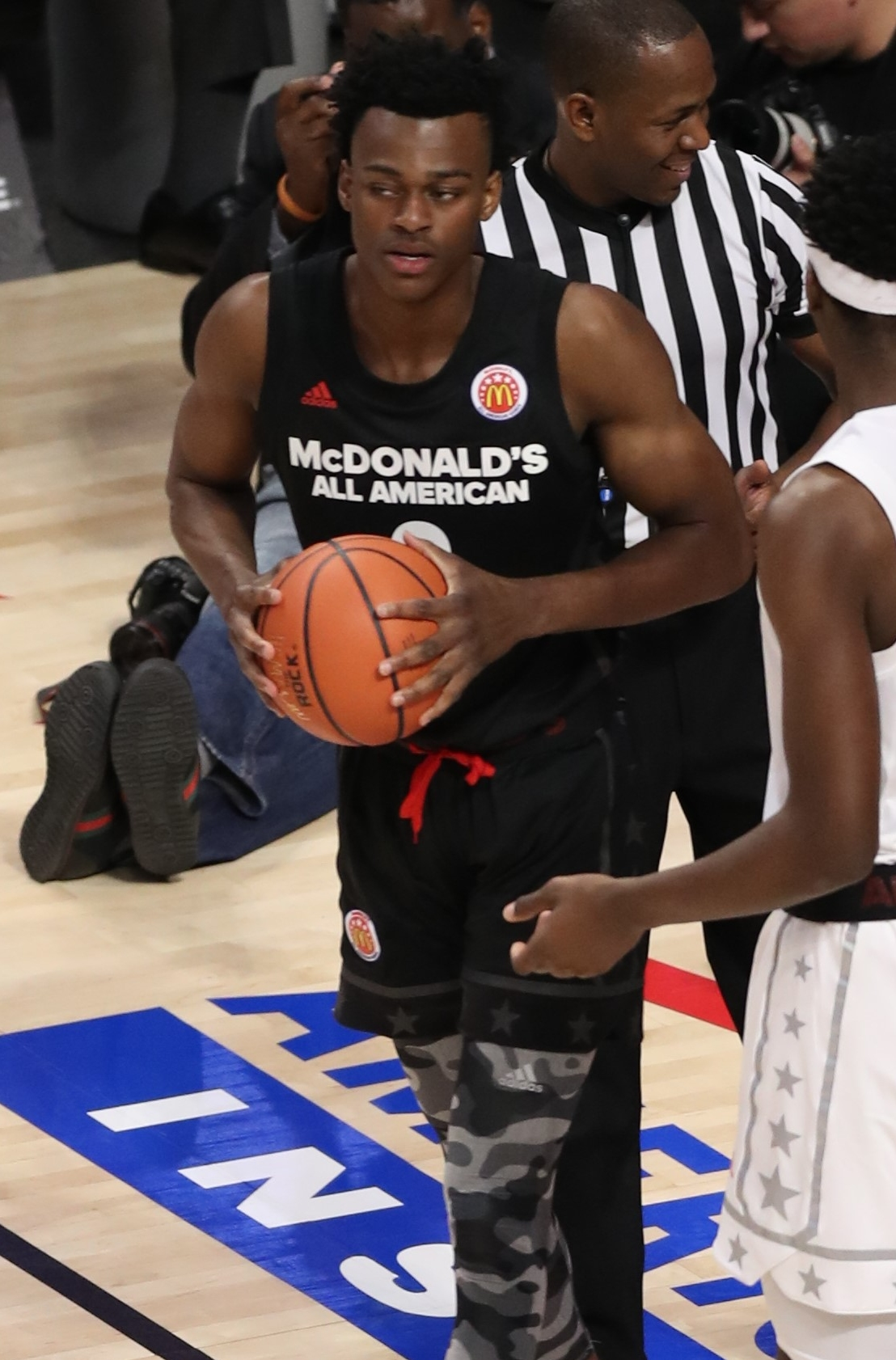
Jarred Vanderbilt

† On September 17, Robinson left Western Kentucky announcing he will prepare for the NBA and will not play college basketball.

=== Team West ===
| ESPN 100 Rank | Name | Height (ft-in) | Weight (lb) | Position | Hometown | High school | College choice |
|---|---|---|---|---|---|---|---|
| 2 | Deandre Ayton | 7-0 | 235 | C | Nassau, Bahamas | Hillcrest Prep | Arizona |
| 12 | Brian Bowen | 6-7 | 212 | SF/PF | LaPorte, Indiana | La Lumiere School | Louisville‡ |
| 17 | Troy Brown Jr. | 6-7 | 205 | SF/PF | Las Vegas, Nevada | Centennial High School | Oregon |
| 26 | Jaylen Hands | 6-3 | 170 | PG | El Cajon, California | Foothills Christian School | UCLA |
| 16 | Jaren Jackson Jr. | 6-11 | 235 | PF/C | LaPorte, Indiana | La Lumiere School | Michigan State |
| 6 | Brandon McCoy | 7-0 | 245 | C | San Diego, California | Cathedral Catholic High School | UNLV^^{~} |
| 30 | Charles O'Bannon Jr. | 6-6 | 200 | SF | Las Vegas, Nevada | Bishop Gorman High School | USC |
| 1 | Michael Porter Jr. | 6-10 | 210 | SF | Columbia, Missouri | Nathan Hale High School | Missouri |
| 20 | Billy Preston | 6-9 | 220 | PF | Santa Ana, California | Oak Hill Academy | Kansas |
| 8 | Gary Trent Jr. | 6-5 | 190 | SG | Napa, California | Prolific Prep Academy | Duke |
| 19 | M. J. Walker | 6-5 | 207 | SG | Jonesboro, Georgia | Jonesboro High School | Florida State^^{~} |
| 15 | Trae Young | 6-2 | 176 | PG | Norman, Oklahoma | Norman North High School | Oklahoma^ |

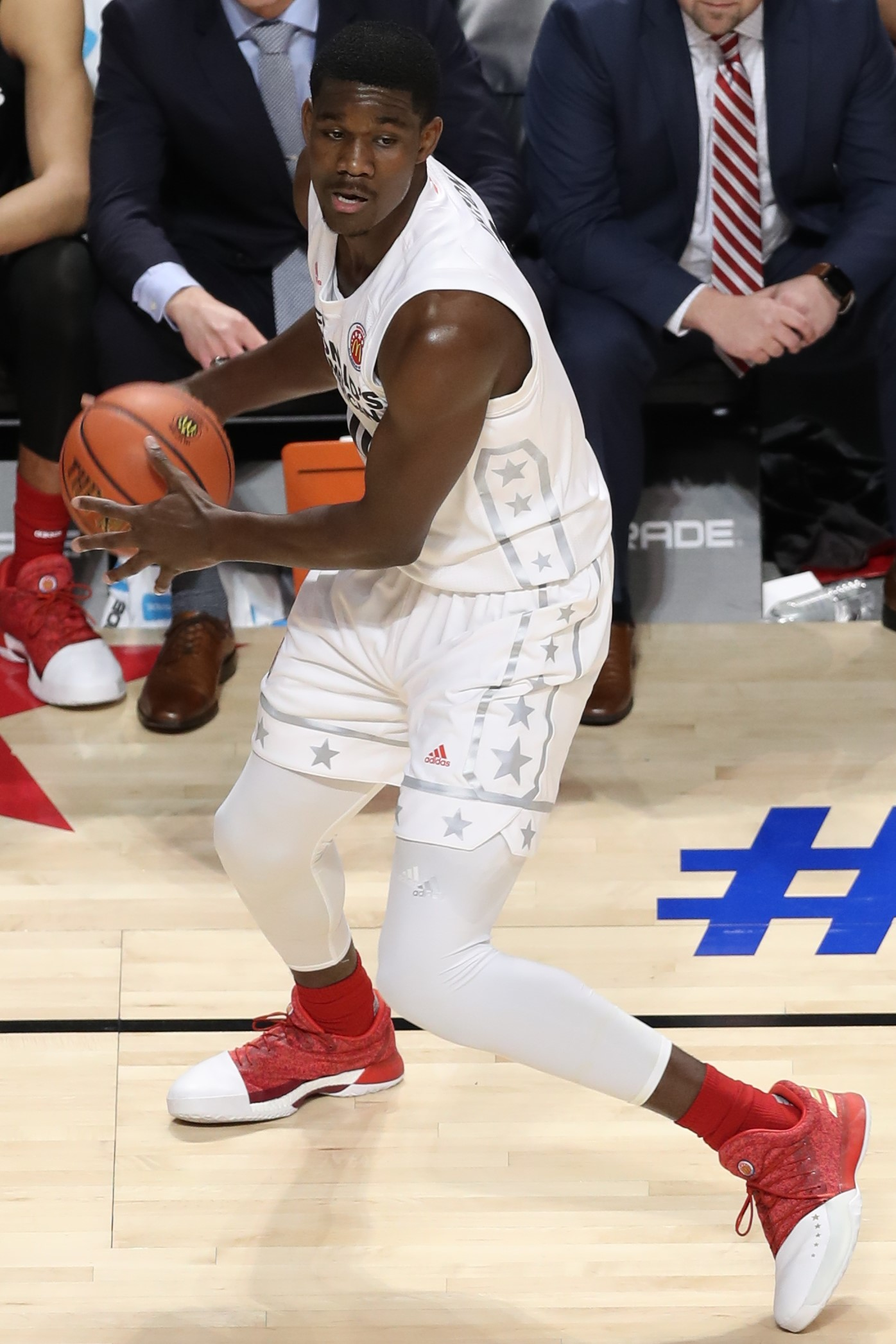
Deandre Ayton

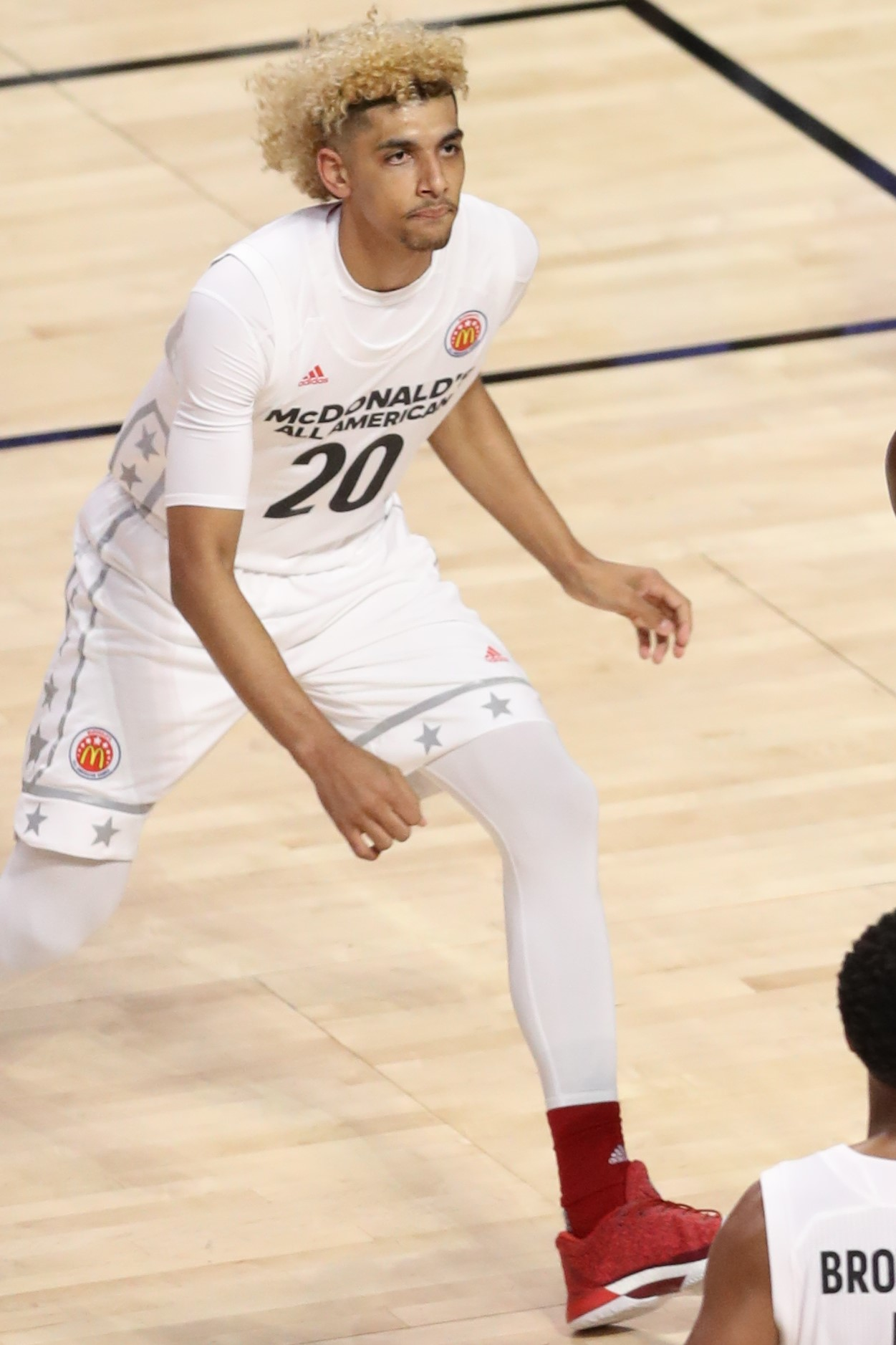
Brian Bowen

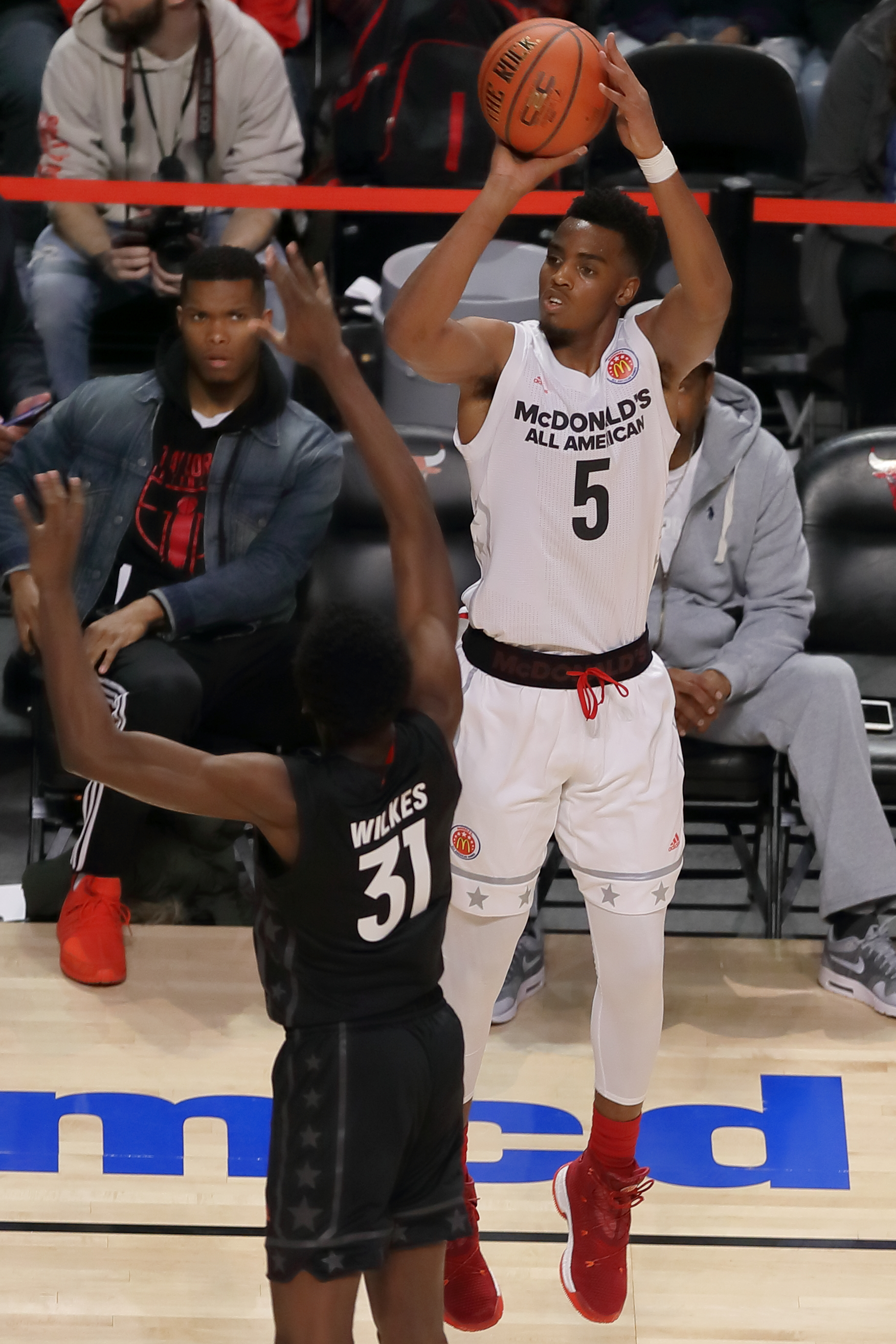
Troy Brown Jr.

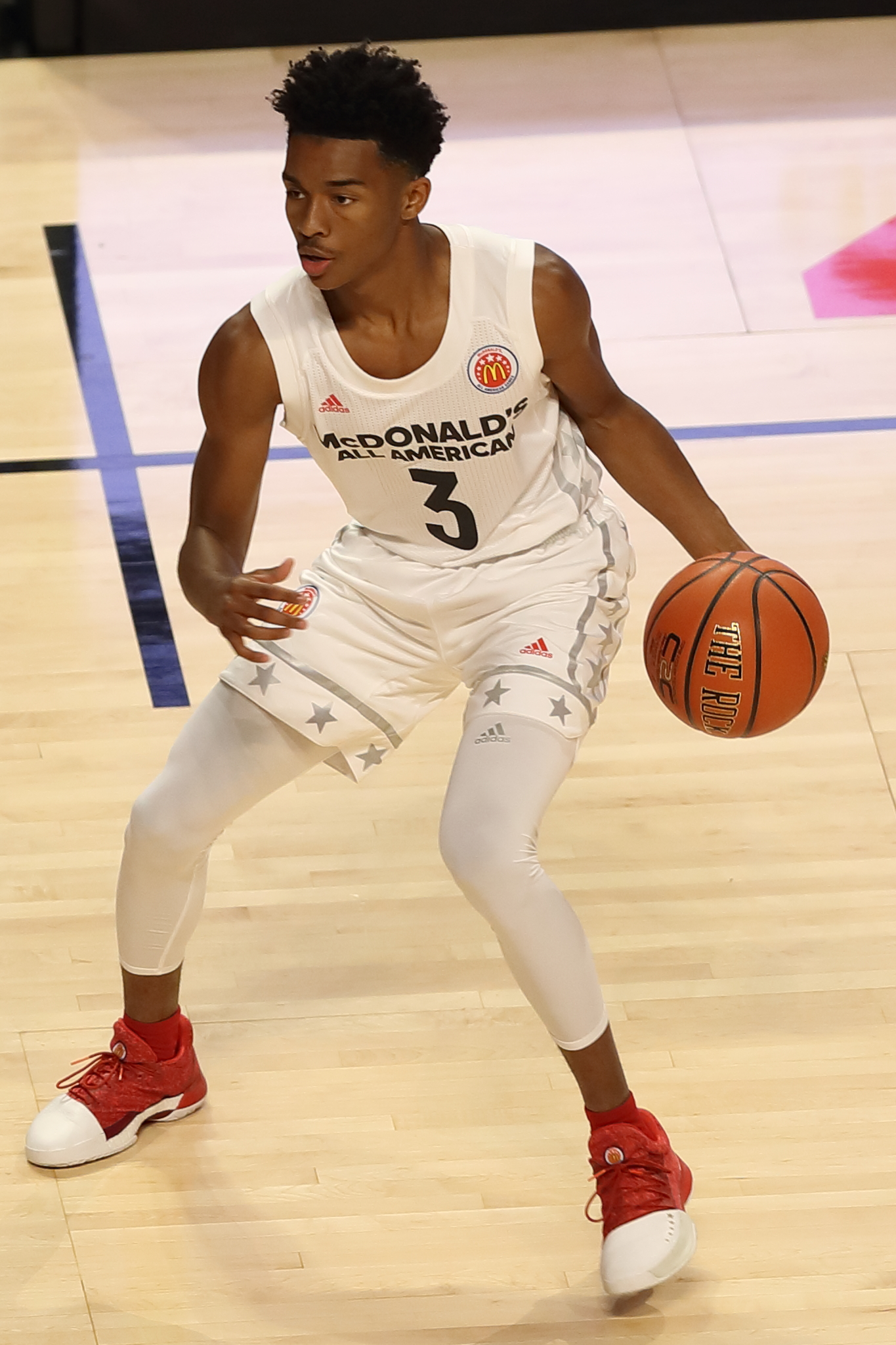
Jaylen Hands

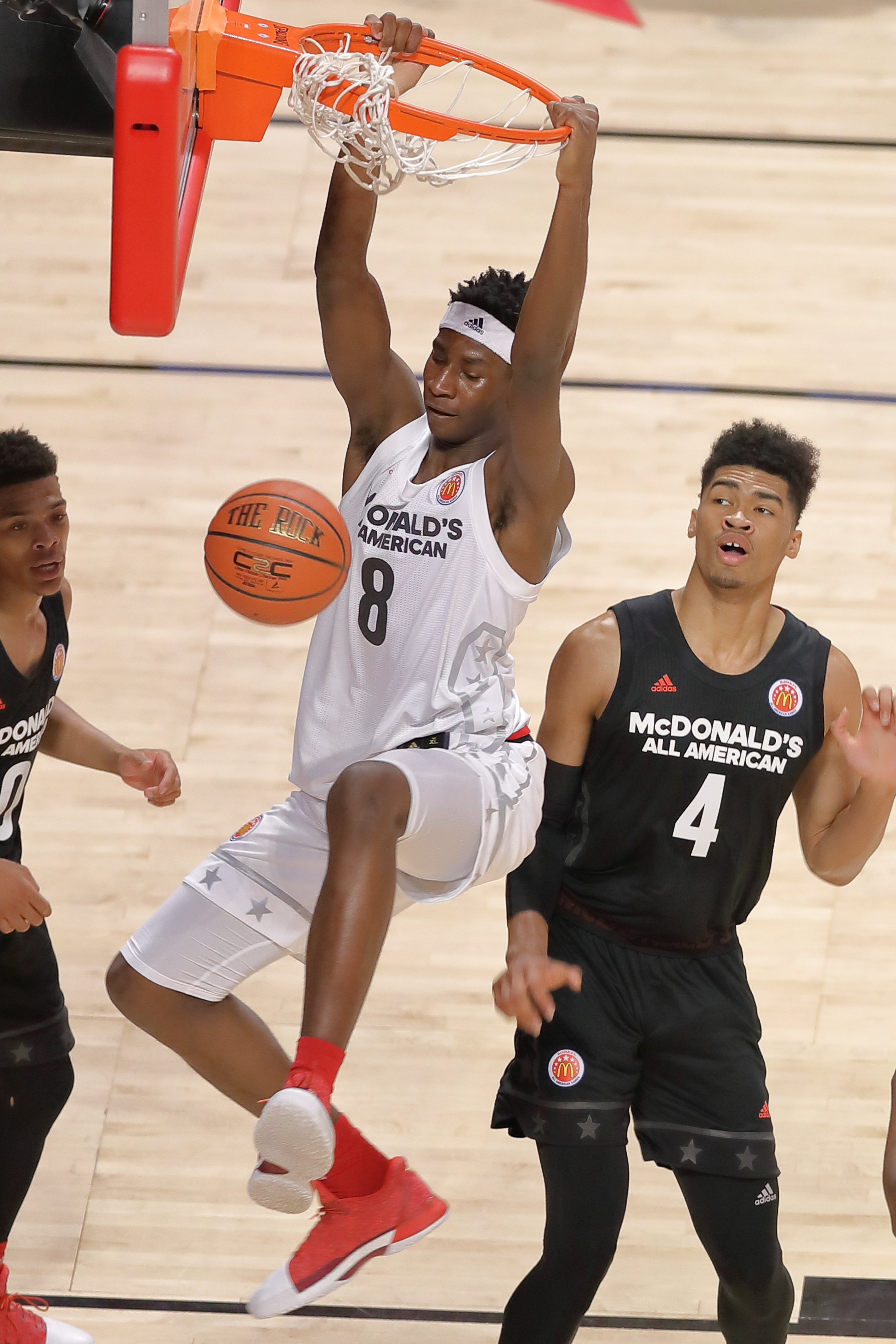
Jaren Jackson Jr.

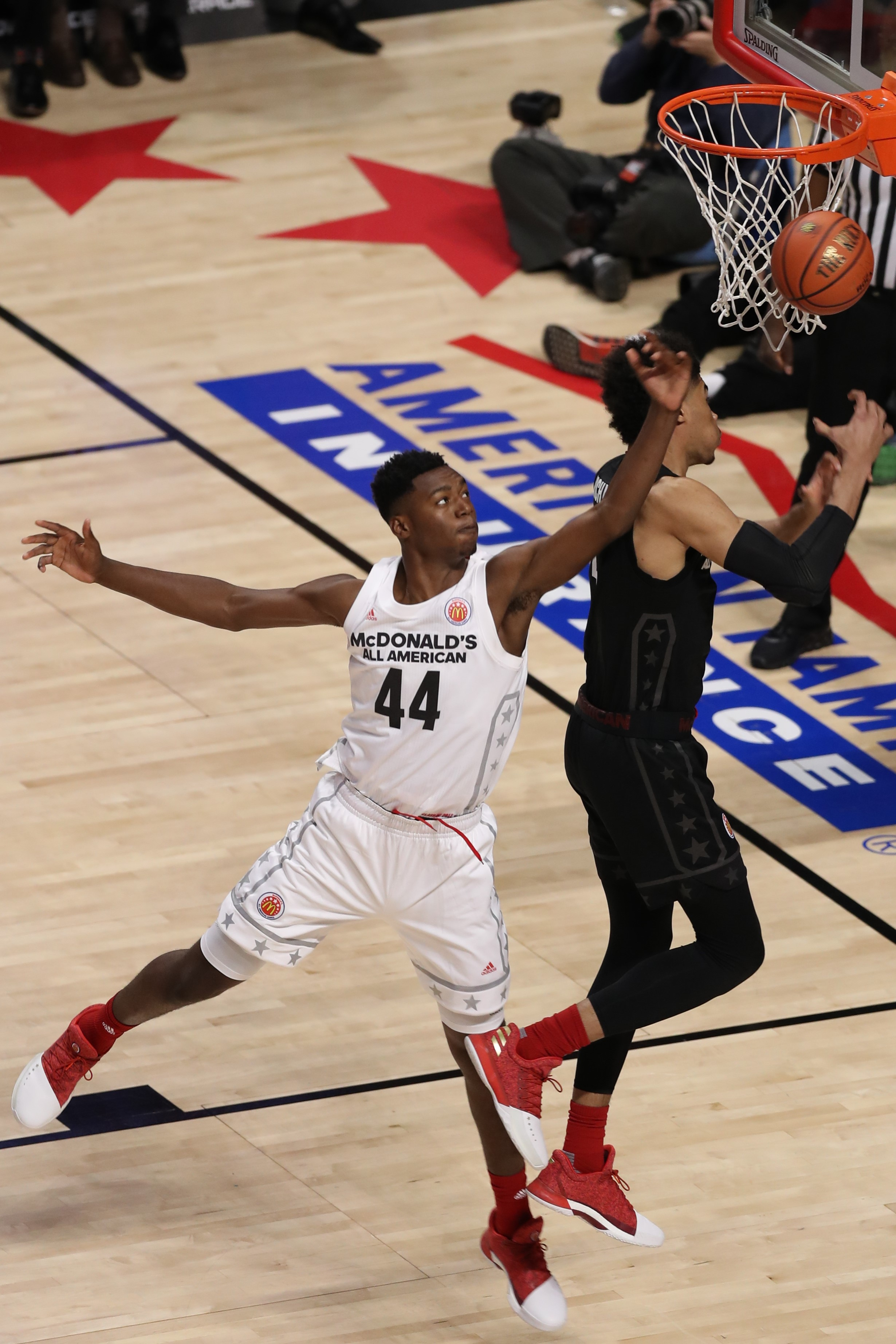
Brandon McCoy

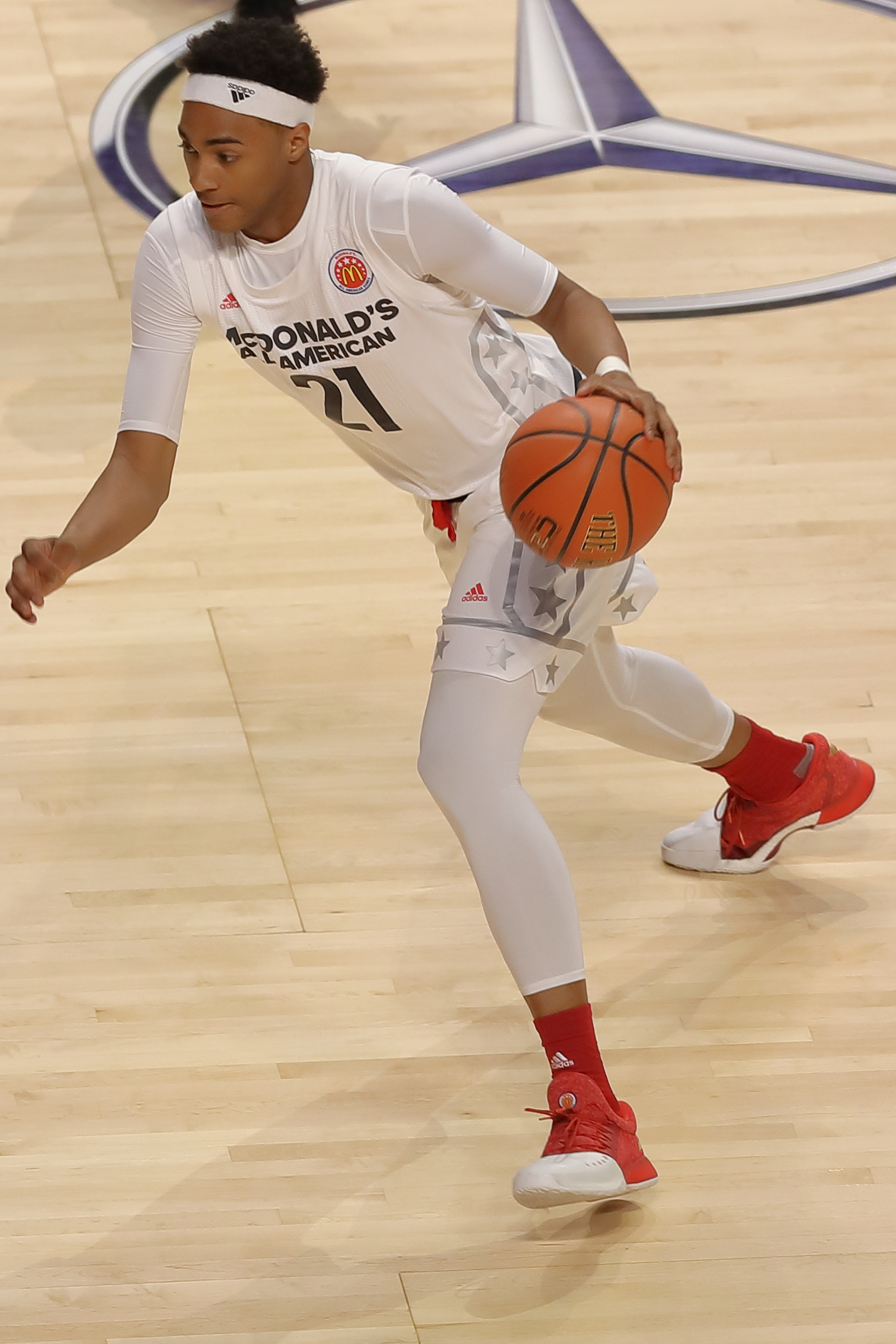
Charles O'Bannon Jr.

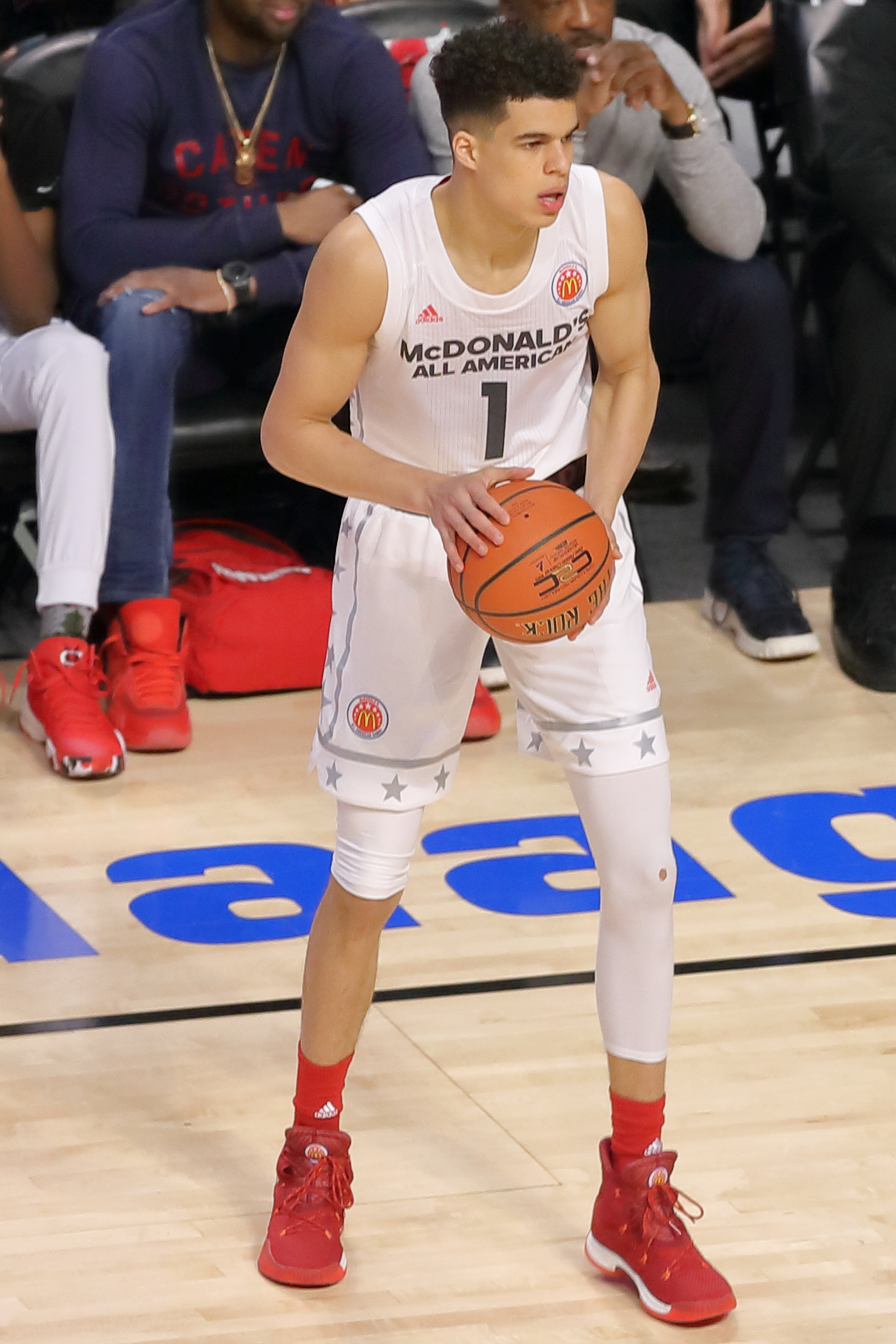
Michael Porter Jr.

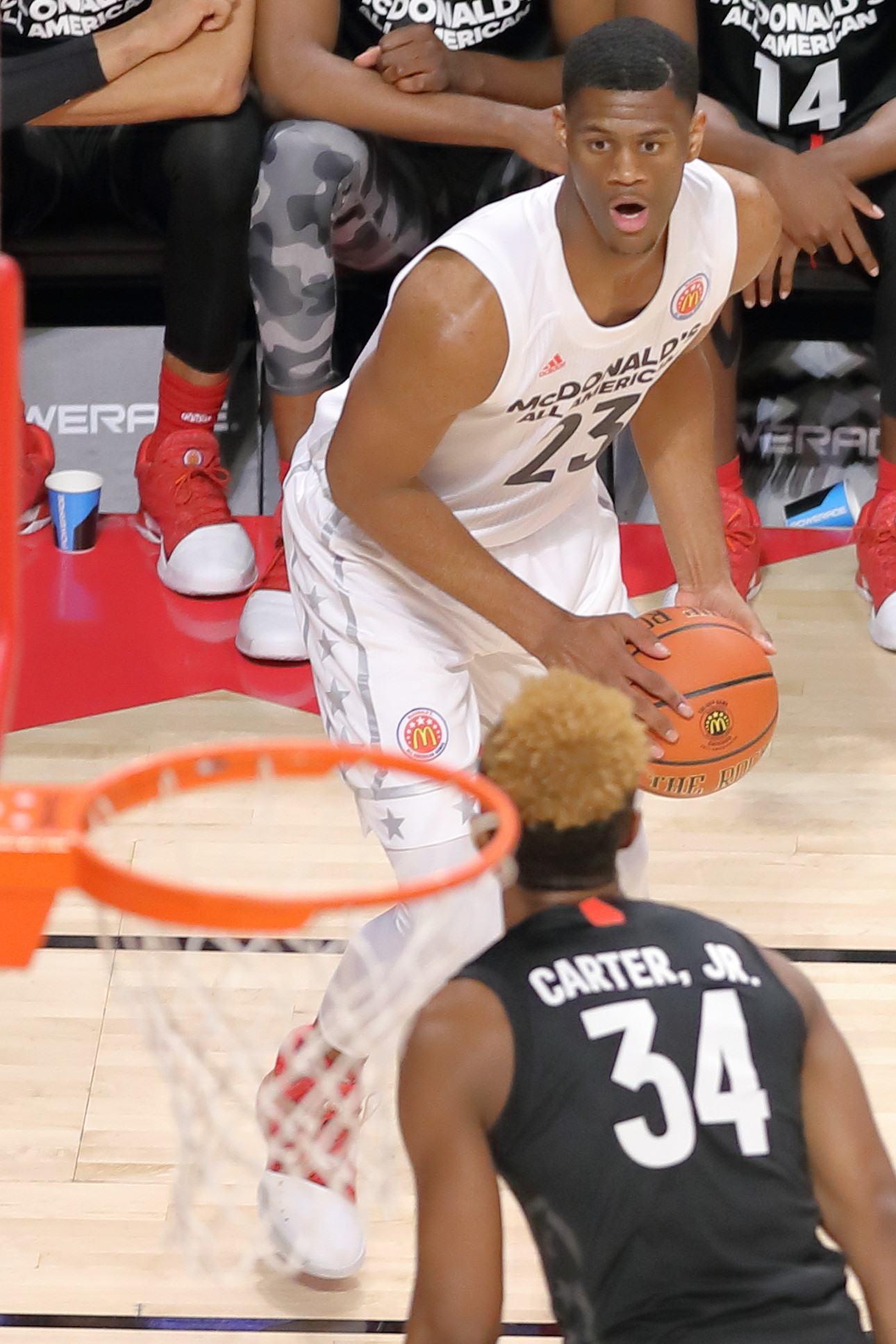
Billy Preston

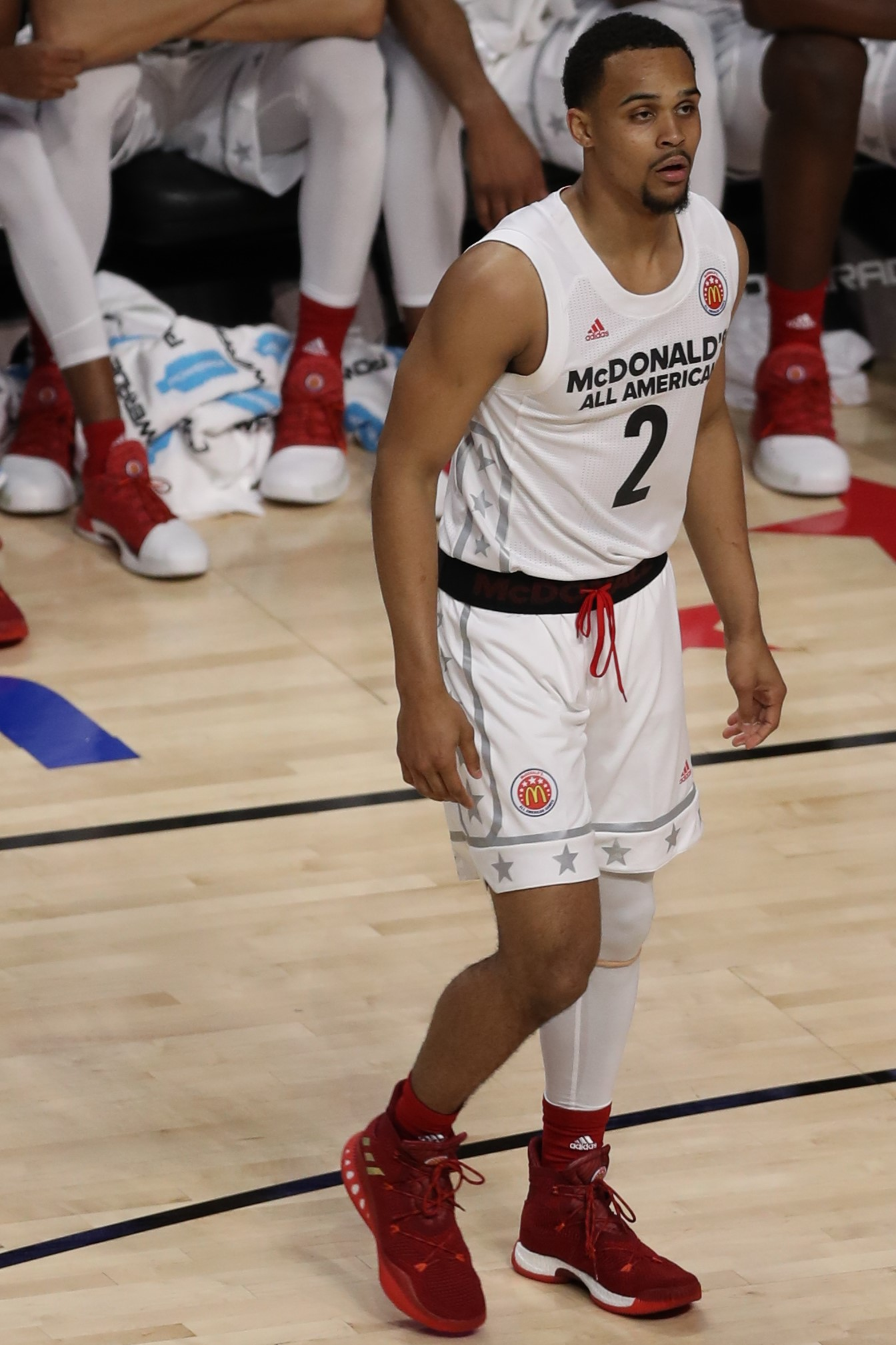
Gary Trent Jr.

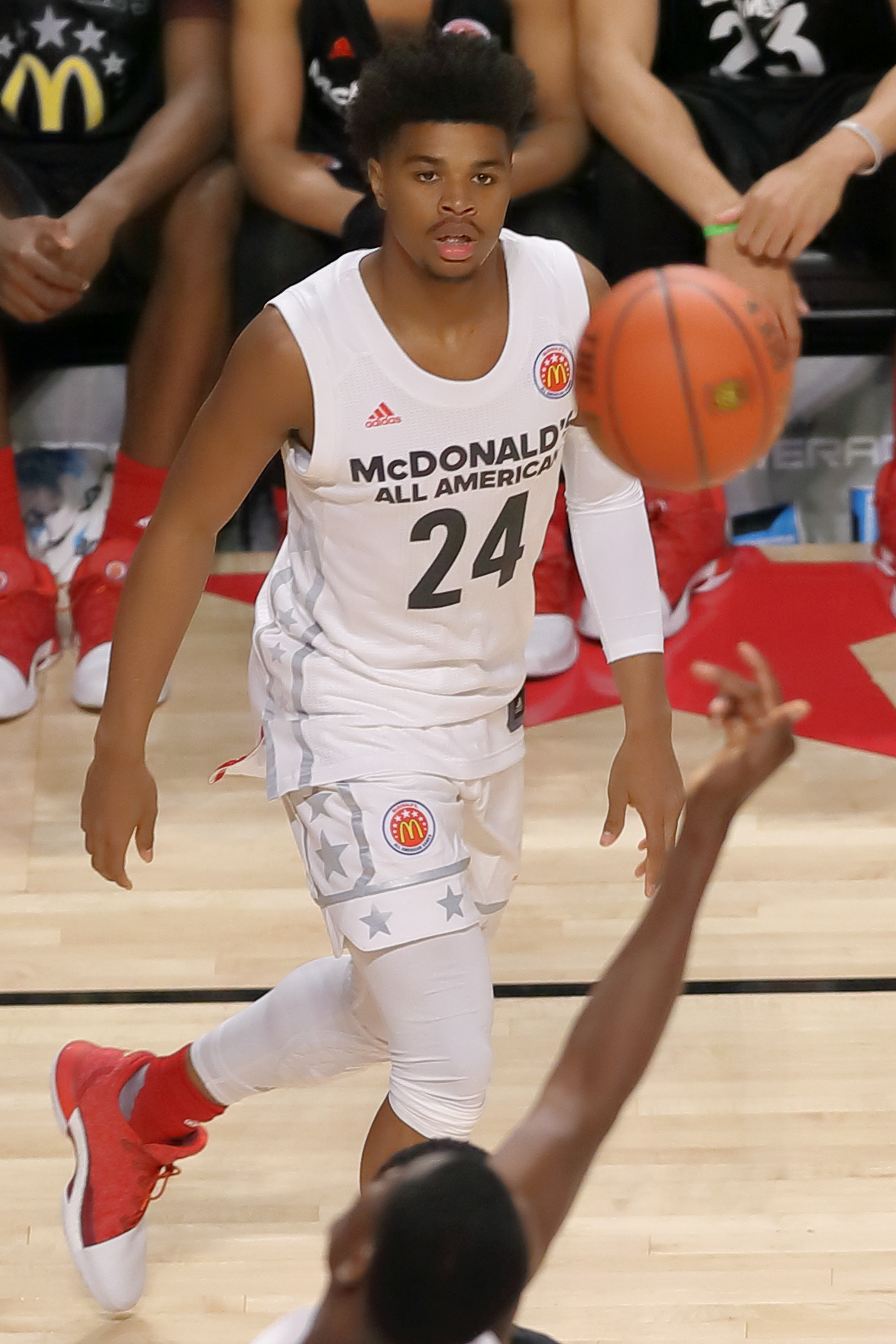
M. J. Walker

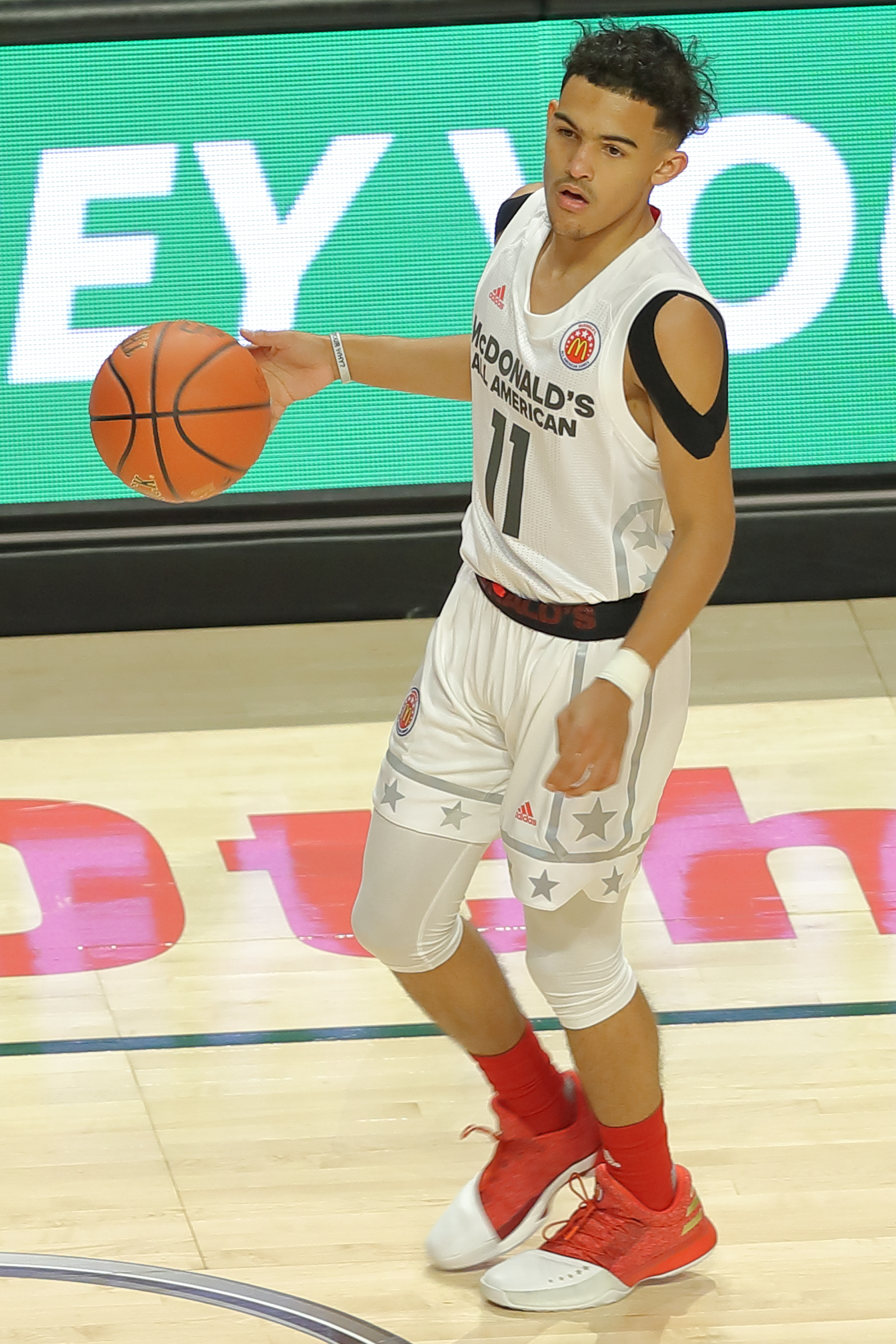
Trae Young

‡ As of 1 October 2017, Bowen is suspended and not allowed to participate in team activities, although he is still listed on the team's roster and is reportedly still enrolled as a student.

^undecided at the time of roster selection
^{~}undecided at game time

== Box Score ==
ESPN

March 29, 2017
09:00 pm ET

Box Score

| East | 107–109 | West |
Scoring by half: 56–51, 50–59
| Pts: Bamba (17); Rebs: Vanderbilt (6); Asts: Sexton (7) | | Pts: Porter Jr. (17); Rebs: Ayton (11); Asts: Young (5) |

United Center, Chicago, IL
Referees: Mark Witzke, Patrick Rock, Tariq Lucas
