= Gary Trent Jr. =

American basketball player (born 1999)

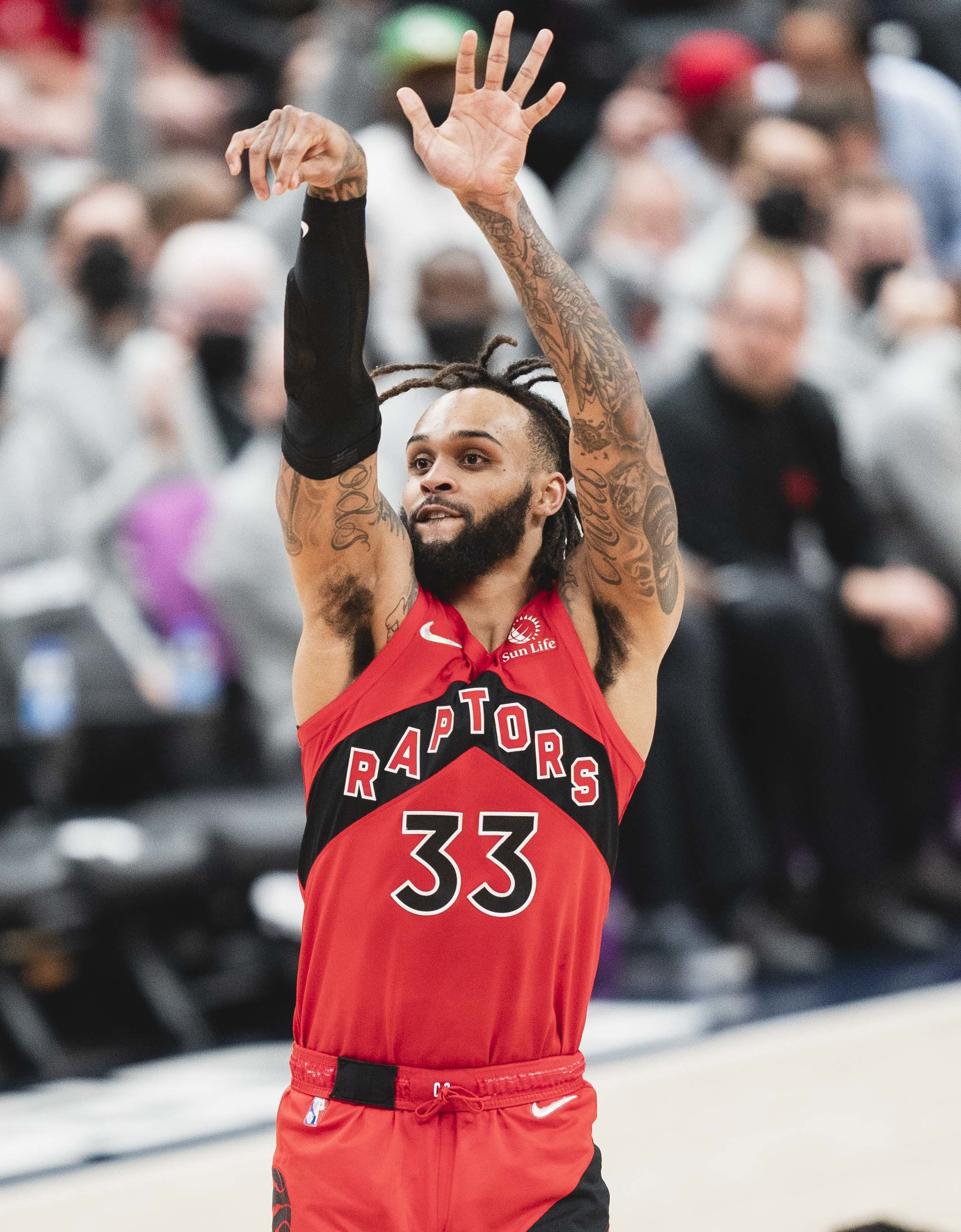
- Trent with the Toronto Raptors in 2022

No. 5 – Milwaukee Bucks
- Position: Shooting guard
- League: NBA

Personal information
- Born: January 18, 1999 (age 27) Columbus, Ohio, U.S.
- Listed height: 6 ft 4 in (1.93 m)
- Listed weight: 204 lb (93 kg)

Career information
- High school: Apple Valley (Apple Valley, Minnesota); Prolific Prep (Napa, California)
- College: Duke (2017–2018)
- NBA draft: 2018: 2nd round, 37th overall pick
- Drafted by: Sacramento Kings
- Playing career: 2018–present

Career history
- 2018–2021: Portland Trail Blazers
- 2019: →Texas Legends
- 2021–2024: Toronto Raptors
- 2024–present: Milwaukee Bucks

Career highlights
- NBA Cup champion (2024); McDonald's All-American (2017); FIBA Americas Under-16 Championship MVP (2015)
- Stats at NBA.com
- Stats at Basketball Reference
Medals
Men's basketball
Representing the United States
FIBA Americas U16 Championship
| Gold medal – first place | 2015 Argentina | National team |
FIBA U17 World Championship
| Gold medal – first place | 2016 Spain | National team |

Gary Dajaun Trent Jr. (born January 18, 1999) is an American professional basketball player for the Milwaukee Bucks of the National Basketball Association (NBA). He played college basketball for the Duke Blue Devils.

== Early life ==
Gary is the son of Roxanne Holt and Gary Trent, an American former professional basketball player. He has three brothers named Garyson, Grayson and Graydon. Gary's father, Gary Trent Sr., played on the 1993 U.S. Olympic Festival North Team that finished with a 4–0 record and captured the gold medal. He also played basketball at Ohio University, nine years in the NBA for the Portland Trail Blazers, Toronto Raptors, Milwaukee Bucks, Dallas Mavericks and Minnesota Timberwolves and also competed in Greece and Italy.

Trent Jr. first attended Apple Valley High School in Apple Valley, Minnesota. As a sophomore, he averaged 21.5 points per game. As a junior, he averaged 26.4 points per game and 5.8 rebounds per game, while earning Gatorade Minnesota Player of the Year, first-team Minneapolis All Metro honors, in addition to being named a first-team junior All-American by Maxpreps. Trent Jr. Averaged 22.2 points per game on the Nike EYBL Circuit for his AAU team, Howard Pulley Panthers.

Before his senior year, Trent Jr. decided to transfer to Prolific Prep in Napa, California. As a senior, he averaged 31.8 points, 6.4 rebounds and 3.8 assist per game while leading his team to a 29–3 overall record. Following his senior year he was selected to play in both 2017 Jordan Brand Classic and 2017 McDonald's All-American Boys Game.

=== Recruiting ===
Trent Jr. was rated as a five-star recruit and considered one of the best players in the 2017 high school class by Scout.com, Rivals.com and ESPN. Trent Jr. Was ranked as the No.8 overall recruit and No.1 shooting guard in the 2017 high school class.

College recruiting
| Name | Hometown | School | Height | Weight | Commit date |
|---|---|---|---|---|---|
| Gary Trent Jr. G | Columbus, OH | Prolific Prep (CA) | 6 ft 5 in (1.96 m) | 210 lb (95 kg) | Nov 10, 2016 |
| Gary Trent Jr. G | Recruit ratings: Scout: Rivals: 247Sports: ESPN: (95) | | | | |
Overall recruit ranking: Scout: #12 Rivals: #13 247Sports: #10 ESPN: #8
Note: In many cases, Scout, Rivals, 247Sports, On3, and ESPN may conflict in their listings of height and weight.; In these cases, the average was taken. ESPN grades are on a 100-point scale.; Sources: "Duke 2017 Basketball Commitments". Rivals.; "2017 Duke Basketball Commits". Scout.; "Scout.com Team Recruiting Rankings". Scout.; "2017 Team Ranking". Rivals.; "2017 Duke 24/7 Sports Commits". 247Sports.

== College career ==
Trent Jr. signed his letter of intent to attend Duke University on November 10, 2016. His Duke entering class included 7 highly rated recruits, four of whom were—like Trent—rated to be 5-star players. The group was the consensus top-rated entering class in the country.

Entering the season, despite starting four freshmen, Duke was the preseason number 1 team and stayed within the top ten throughout the season. Trent had multiple highlights during the season. On December 9, 2017, Trent Jr. scored 25 points in an 89–84 loss against Boston College, where he also tied the Duke Freshman record for six three point shots made. On January 13, 2018, despite battling an illness, Trent scored 19 points in a victory over Wake Forest. Against Miami on January 15, Trent scored a career-high 30 points in a Duke comeback victory. On January 22, 2018, Trent was named Atlantic Coast Conference Co-Player and Rookie of the week. On January 29, 2018, he scored a double-double of 22 points 10 rebounds in an 88–66 victory against Notre Dame.

Duke entered the ACC tournament as the No. 2 seed. After beating Notre Dame in the first round, Duke lost in the semi-finals against rival North Carolina.

Duke entered the 2018 NCAA men's basketball tournament as the #2 seed in the Midwest. In the tournament, the Duke team defeated the Iona, Rhode Island, and Syracuse, thereby advancing to the 4th round. In the Elite Eight, they lost to Kansas in overtime.

Afterward, all five Duke starters announced they would pursue a career in professional basketball. These included one senior, Grayson Allen, and four freshmen: Trent, along with teammates Marvin Bagley III, Wendell Carter, Jr, and Trevon Duval.

== Professional career ==
=== Portland Trail Blazers (2018–2021) ===
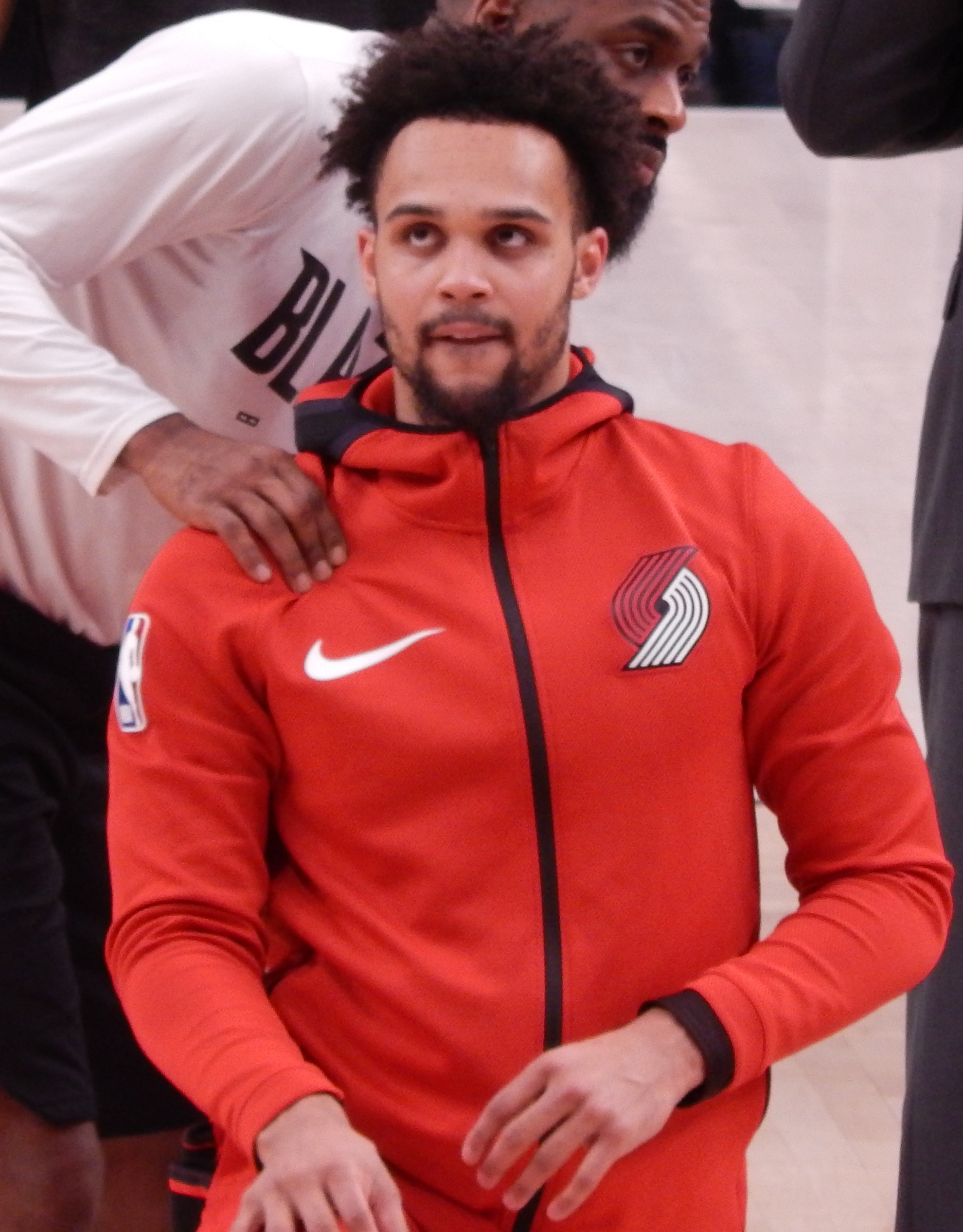
Trent with the Portland Trail Blazers in 2019

On June 21, 2018, Trent Jr. was drafted by the Sacramento Kings with the 37th overall selection in the 2018 NBA draft. He was subsequently traded to the Portland Trail Blazers. Trent Jr. signed with the Trail Blazers to a three-year deal on July 6.

During his rookie year, Trent played in 15 NBA games, averaging 2.7 points per game. Much of the season, the Blazers assigned him to the Texas Legends for an NBA G League.

During his 2nd and 3rd years in the NBA, Trent's numbers significantly improved. He averaged 22 minutes and 8.9 points per game in the 2019–2020 season and 31 minutes and 15 points per game during his 3rd season.

=== Toronto Raptors (2021–2024) ===
On March 25, 2021, the Toronto Raptors acquired Trent Jr. and Rodney Hood in a trade for Norman Powell. Trent Jr. scored a then career-high 31 points in a March 31 loss to the Oklahoma City Thunder. On April 2, in a 53-points blowout win over the Golden State Warriors, Trent Jr. recorded the second-highest plus–minus (+54) since the league started tracking the stat in 1996. On April 10, he scored a career-high 44 points on 17 of 19 shooting in a 135–115 victory over the Cleveland Cavaliers. On August 2, 2021, Trent Jr. signed a three-year, $54 million deal with the Raptors.

On January 25, 2022, Trent Jr. scored 32 points in a 125–113 win vs the Charlotte Hornets. On a back-to-back on January 26, he scored 32 points with six made three-pointers in a game against the Chicago Bulls. In a triple overtime game played on January 29, Trent Jr. scored 33 points and had five steals in a 124–120 win over the Miami Heat. On January 31, Trent Jr. dropped a career high in three-pointers made in a 106–100 win over the Atlanta Hawks, scoring 31 points and making nine three-pointers; he joined Kyle Lowry as the only Raptors to hit 5+ three-pointers in four straight games. On February 1, Trent Jr. recorded his fifth straight 30-point game, scoring 33 points in a 110–106 win over the Heat, joining DeMar DeRozan as the only other Raptor to do so. On February 10, Trent Jr. scored a season-high 42 points, along with five steals and five made three-pointers, in a 139–120 victory over the Houston Rockets. On March 11, Trent Jr. tied his season-high 42 points, along with eight rebounds, on 8–11 shooting from three-point range in a 107–102 over the reigning Western Conference champion Phoenix Suns.

On June 20, 2023, Trent Jr. exercised his $18.56 million player option to return to the Raptors for the 2023–24 season.

On December 18, 2023, Trent Jr. achieved his first career double-double with 22 points and 10 rebounds in a 114–99 win against the Charlotte Hornets.

On March 7, 2024, Trent Jr. scored a season-high 30 points in a 120–113 loss against the Phoenix Suns.

On April 5, 2024, Trent Jr. helped the Raptors break their 15-game losing streak, scoring 31 points in a 117–111 win over the Milwaukee Bucks.

=== Milwaukee Bucks (2024–present) ===
On July 20, 2024, Trent Jr. signed a one-year minimum deal with the Milwaukee Bucks. On February 9, 2025, Trent Jr. scored a then season-high 23 points during a win over the Philadelphia 76ers. On April 10, Trent Jr. scored a season–high 29 points during a 111-107 win over the New Orleans Pelicans. On April 25, in Game 3 of the first round against the Indiana Pacers, Trent scored 37 points, including nine three-pointers, in a 117–101 victory. His nine three-pointers tied a playoff record in Bucks franchise history. The Bucks were eliminated in five games, despite Trent's 33-point performance in a 119–118 closeout overtime loss in Game 5.

On July 8, 2025, Trent Jr. re–signed with the Bucks on a two-year, $7.5 million contract. The second year is a player option.

Trent Jr. opted out of the second year and on July 11, 2026 he agreed to a four-year, $64 million deal with the Bucks.

== Career statistics ==
Legend
| GP | Games played | GS | Games started | MPG | Minutes per game |
| FG% | Field goal percentage | 3P% | 3-point field goal percentage | FT% | Free throw percentage |
| RPG | Rebounds per game | APG | Assists per game | SPG | Steals per game |
| BPG | Blocks per game | PPG | Points per game | **Bold** | Career high |

=== NBA ===
==== Regular season ====
| Year | Team | GP | GS | MPG | FG% | 3P% | FT% | RPG | APG | SPG | BPG | PPG |
|---|---|---|---|---|---|---|---|---|---|---|---|---|
| 2018–19 | Portland | 15 | 1 | 7.4 | .320 | .238 | .429 | .7 | .3 | .1 | .1 | 2.7 |
| 2019–20 | Portland | 61 | 8 | 21.8 | **.444** | **.418** | .822 | 1.6 | 1.0 | .8 | **.3** | 8.9 |
| 2020–21 | Portland | 41 | 23 | 30.8 | .414 | .397 | .773 | 2.2 | 1.4 | .9 | .1 | 15.6 |
| 2020–21 | Toronto | 17 | 15 | 31.8 | .395 | .355 | .806 | **3.6** | 1.3 | 1.1 | .2 | 16.2 |
| 2021–22 | Toronto | 70 | **69** | **35.0** | .414 | .383 | **.853** | 2.7 | **2.0** | **1.7** | **.3** | **18.3** |
| 2022–23 | Toronto | 66 | 44 | 32.1 | .433 | .369 | .839 | 2.6 | 1.6 | 1.6 | .2 | 17.4 |
| 2023–24 | Toronto | 71 | 41 | 28.1 | .426 | .393 | .771 | 2.6 | 1.7 | 1.1 | .1 | 13.7 |
| 2024–25 | Milwaukee | **74** | 9 | 25.6 | .431 | .416 | .848 | 2.3 | 1.2 | 1.0 | .1 | 11.1 |
| 2025–26 | Milwaukee | 65 | 21 | 21.2 | .387 | .360 | .769 | 1.0 | 1.2 | .5 | .0 | 8.1 |
| Career | | 480 | 231 | 27.2 | .420 | .387 | .819 | 2.2 | 1.4 | 1.1 | .2 | 13.0 |

==== Playoffs ====
| Year | Team | GP | GS | MPG | FG% | 3P% | FT% | RPG | APG | SPG | BPG | PPG |
|---|---|---|---|---|---|---|---|---|---|---|---|---|
| 2020 | Portland | 5 | 1 | 30.6 | .356 | .417 | .857 | 2.0 | .6 | .8 | .0 | 9.6 |
| 2022 | Toronto | **6** | **6** | 33.2 | .378 | .333 | **.895** | 1.8 | **1.3** | 1.0 | **.5** | 15.3 |
| 2025 | Milwaukee | 5 | 3 | **34.2** | **.516** | **.500** | .800 | **2.2** | 1.2 | **2.6** | .0 | **18.8** |
| Career | | 16 | 10 | 32.7 | .418 | .421 | .861 | 1.9 | 1.1 | 1.4 | .2 | 14.6 |

=== College ===
| Year | Team | GP | GS | MPG | FG% | 3P% | FT% | RPG | APG | SPG | BPG | PPG |
|---|---|---|---|---|---|---|---|---|---|---|---|---|
| 2017–18 | Duke | 37 | 37 | 33.8 | .415 | .402 | .876 | 4.2 | 1.4 | 1.2 | .2 | 14.5 |
