= Brian Bowen =

American basketball player (born 1998)

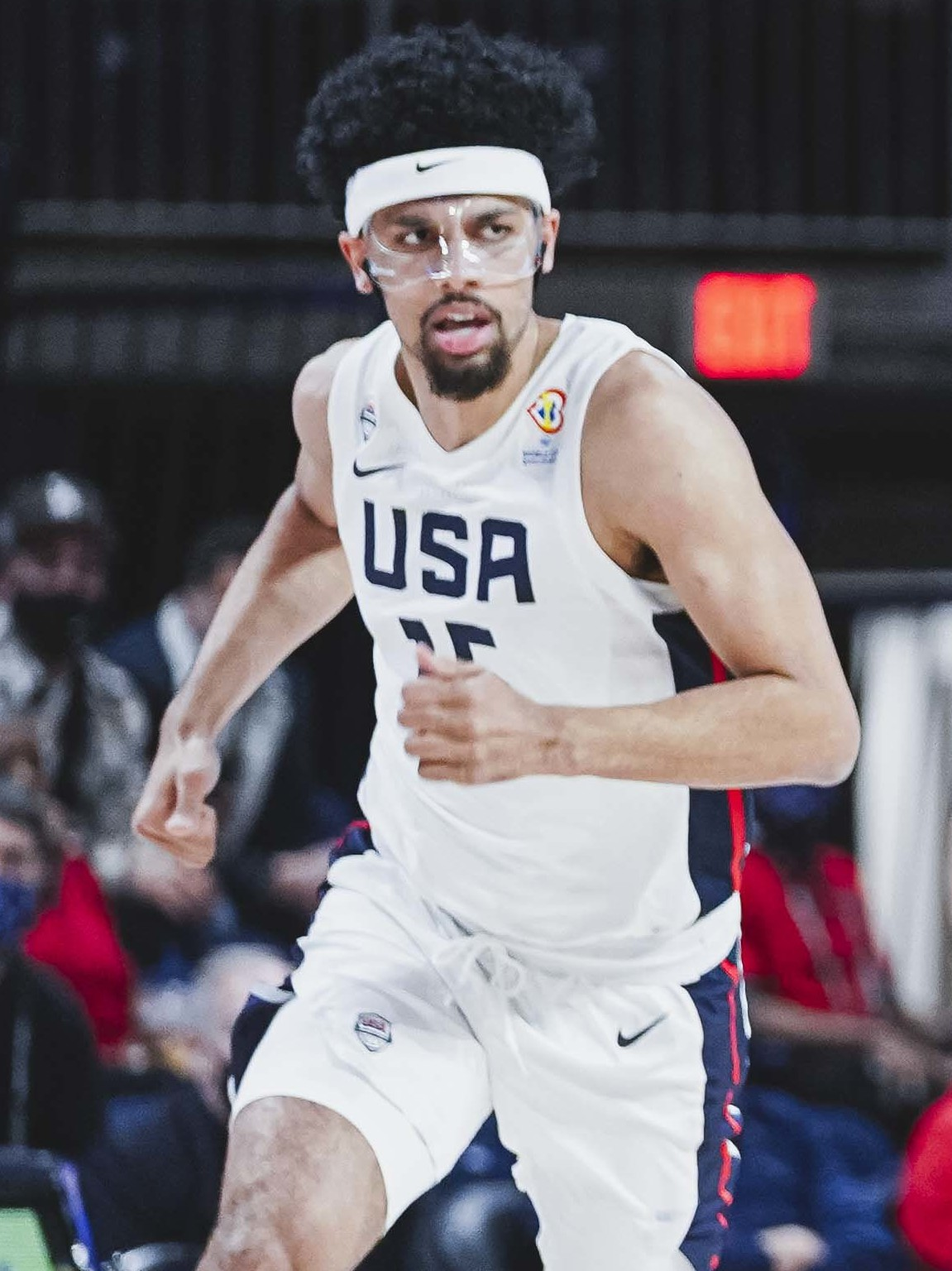
- Bowen with USA in 2022

No. 2 – Kozuv
- Position: Small forward / shooting guard
- League: Macedonian First League

Personal information
- Born: October 2, 1998 (age 27) Saginaw, Michigan, U.S.
- Listed height: 6 ft 7 in (2.01 m)
- Listed weight: 190 lb (86 kg)

Career information
- High school: Arthur Hill (Saginaw, Michigan); La Lumiere School (La Porte, Indiana)
- NBA draft: 2019: undrafted
- Playing career: 2018–present

Career history
- 2018–2019: Sydney Kings
- 2019–2021: Indiana Pacers
- 2019–2021: →Fort Wayne Mad Ants
- 2021–2023: Iowa Wolves
- 2024: Cleveland Charge
- 2024–2025: Stockton Kings
- 2026–present: Kožuv

Career highlights
- NBA G League Champion (2025); McDonald's All-American (2017)
- Stats at NBA.com
- Stats at Basketball Reference

Brian Bowen II (born October 2, 1998) is an American professional basketball player for Kožuv of the Macedonian First League. He originally committed to play college basketball for the Louisville Cardinals but was suspended by the team after a national college basketball corruption scandal which alleged that his family accepted payments in exchange for his choice to attend Louisville. He later tried to play for the South Carolina Gamecocks, but due to an NCAA ruling, he removed himself from college and the 2018 NBA draft altogether. Nicknamed "Tugs", he was named a McDonald's All-American as a senior in high school in 2017.

== High school career ==
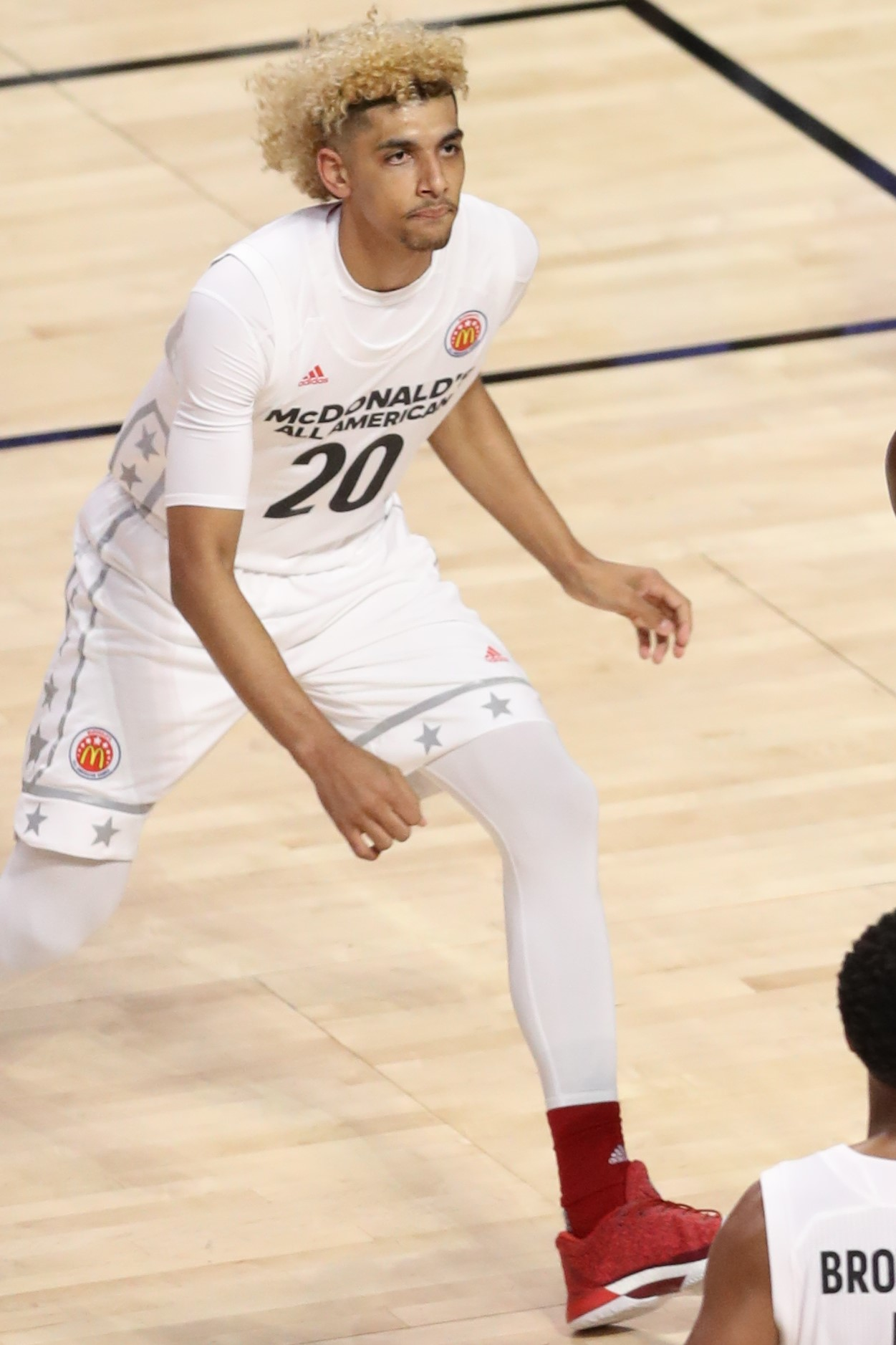
Bowen at the 2017 McDonald's All-American game

Bowen played at Arthur Hill High School in Saginaw, Michigan, before transferring to La Lumiere School in La Porte, Indiana, in 2015. He had three points in the 2017 McDonald's All-American Boys Game. As a senior at La Lumiere, he had averaged 22 points per contest, while leading his team to a national championship at the Dick's Sporting Goods high school tournament. In the 2017 Jordan Brand Classic, he scored a game high 26 points, including 6-of-7 from beyond the arc, and was named co-MVP.

== College recruiting ==
Bowen was the last five-star recruit in the class of 2017 to announce his college commitment. It was announced on June 3, 2017, that he would be enrolling at Louisville. He reportedly also had offers from Michigan State, Arizona, UCLA, Oregon, Texas, DePaul and Creighton on the table. In September 2017, a Federal Bureau of Investigation investigative report into a college basketball corruption scandal made an ostensibly anonymous reference to alleged payments to the family of a student-athlete named only as "Player-10" who was recruited by an institution named only as "University-6". That university was described in such a way that it could only have been the University of Louisville. Player-10's signing was reportedly announced on or about June 3, 2017, and Bowen was the only Louisville player whose signing was in fact announced on or about that day.

At the end of the summer, he enrolled in classes and began participating in preseason team activities as scheduled. On September 27, 2017, Louisville coach Rick Pitino and athletic director Tom Jurich were placed on administrative leave, and eventually dismissed. On the same day, Bowen was also suspended from all team activities, but he continued to be enrolled in the school and he still had his scholarship. On November 3, 2017, Bowen was cleared by the FBI. On November 22, 2017, Louisville announced that Bowen will not play or practice for the team. Academically, he was still a student in good standing at the time. On January 10, 2018, University of South Carolina coach Frank Martin announced that Bowen had enrolled at the university and would join the Gamecocks' basketball program. The university anticipated that Bowen would have to sit out the next two semesters, due to NCAA transfer regulations, meaning he would be able to begin playing within January 2019. However, on April 18, 2018, Bowen announced his intentions on entering the 2018 NBA draft, with him later being one of 69 players to enter that year's NBA Draft Combine. He would do so without hiring an agent, meaning he originally planned to return properly, but only if his confirmation on his transfer would be approved by the May 30 deadline. However, by that point in time, he had heard from the NCAA that he would have been forced to sit out for at least another season due to the combination of alleged benefits that were given to his family back when he committed to Louisville and his transfer soon afterward to South Carolina. As a result, he officially announced his entry for the 2018 NBA Draft that day instead of returning to college. However, on the June 11 international deadline, Bowen announced his withdrawal from the 2018 draft, which would allow him to either play in the NBA G League or overseas professionally before potentially returning in a future NBA Draft.

== Professional career ==
=== Sydney Kings (2018–2019) ===
After withdrawing from the 2018 NBA draft during the final entry deadline, Bowen made the decision to forgo college and pursue a professional contract. On August 7, 2018, Bowen signed with the Sydney Kings of the Australian NBL. During the 2018–19 NBL season, he played in 30 games while averaging 6.3 points and 3.2 rebounds per game. At the season's end, Bowen became automatically eligible for the 2019 NBA draft.

=== Indiana Pacers (2019–2021) ===
Bowen was not selected in the 2019 NBA draft. On July 1, 2019, Bowen signed a two-way contract with the Indiana Pacers and their G League affiliate, the Fort Wayne Mad Ants. Bowen averaged 16.1 points and 7.7 rebounds per game in the G League. On November 29, 2020, the Indiana Pacers announced that they had re-signed with Bowen to a two-way contract. On April 23, 2021, the Pacers waived Bowen. Bowen later filed a lawsuit at the United States District Court for the District of South Carolina against Adidas and others who he claimed derailed his NBA career, but the case was dismissed on May 26, 2021.

=== Iowa Wolves (2021–2023) ===
On September 20, 2021, Bowen signed with the Minnesota Timberwolves. However, he was waived prior to the start of the season. On October 26, he signed with the Iowa Wolves as an affiliate player. On March 10, 2022, he was waived.

On March 9, 2023, Bowen was reacquired by the Iowa Wolves. On October 21, he signed with the Minnesota Timberwolves, but was waived the same day. On October 29, he returned to Iowa, but was waived on December 14.

On January 2, 2024, Bowen joined the Windy City Bulls, but was waived five days later without playing for them.

=== Cleveland Charge (2024) ===
On January 19, 2024, Bowen joined the Cleveland Charge, but was waived eleven days later

=== Stockton Kings (2024–present) ===
On February 20, 2024, Bowen joined the Stockton Kings.

== Career statistics ==
Legend
GP	Games played	GS	Games started	MPG	Minutes per game
FG%	Field goal percentage	3P%	3-point field goal percentage	FT%	Free throw percentage
RPG	Rebounds per game	APG	Assists per game	SPG	Steals per game
BPG	Blocks per game	PPG	Points per game	**Bold**	Career high

=== NBA ===
Year	Team	GP	GS	MPG	FG%	3P%	FT%	RPG	APG	SPG	BPG	PPG
2019–20	Indiana	**6**	**1**	**5.2**	**.300**	.000	—	**1.2**	.0	.0	**.2**	**1.0**
2020–21	Indiana	6	0	2.5	.250	.000	**1.000**	.5	.0	.0	.0	.5
Career		12	1	3.8	.286	.000	1.000	.8	.0	.0	.1	.8

=== NBL ===
Year	Team	GP	GS	MPG	FG%	3P%	FT%	RPG	APG	SPG	BPG	PPG
2018–19	Sydney	28	3	15.5	.462	.351	.788	3.0	.6	.3	.1	6.5
Career		28	3	15.5	.462	.351	.788	3.0	.6	.3	.1	6.5
