= Trevon Duval =

American basketball player (born 1998)

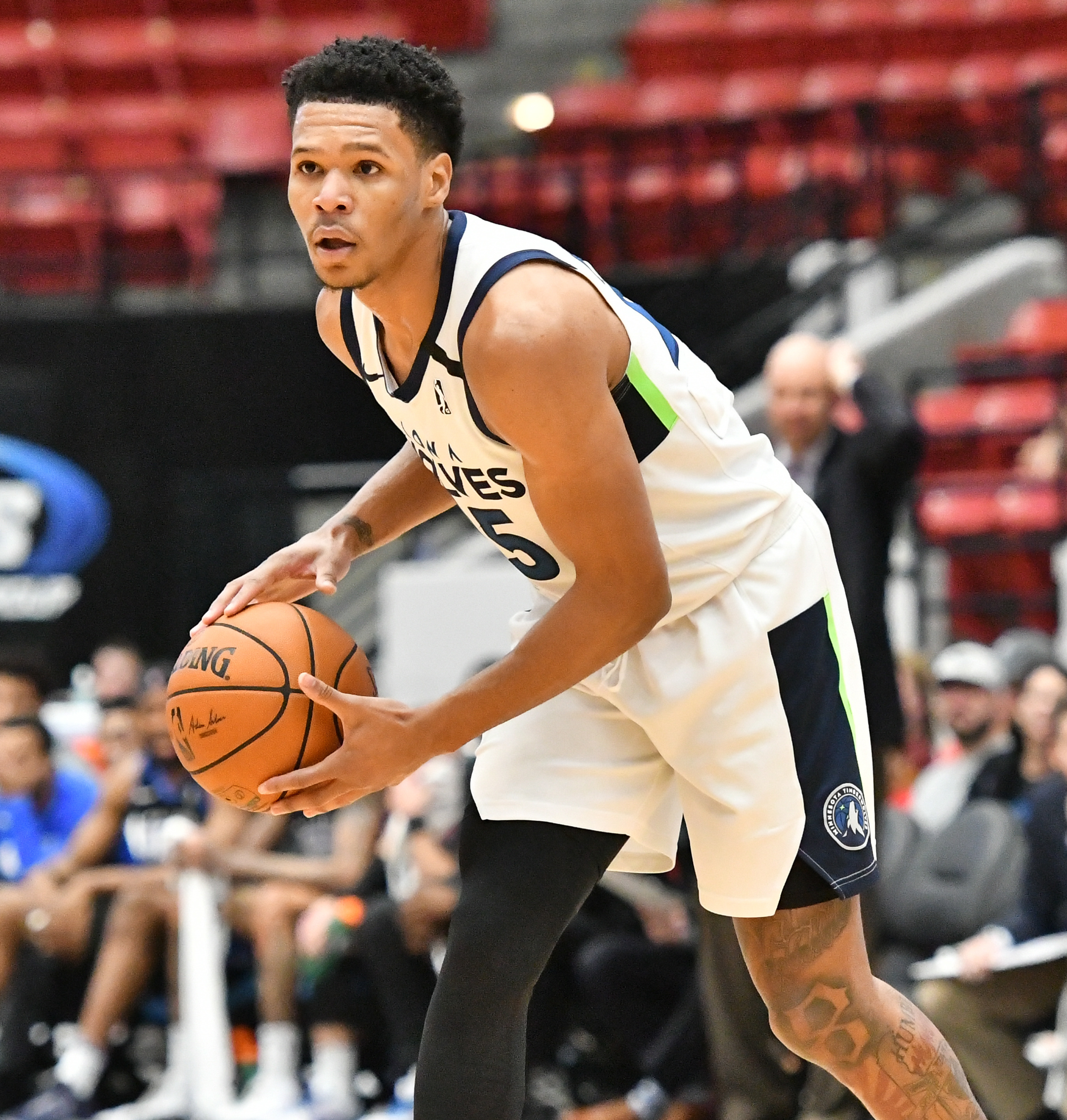
- Duval with the Iowa Wolves in 2020

No. 34 – Greensboro Swarm
- Position: Point guard
- League: NBA G League

Personal information
- Born: August 3, 1998 (age 28) Queens, New York, U.S.
- Listed height: 6 ft 2 in (1.88 m)
- Listed weight: 189 lb (86 kg)

Career information
- High school: St. Benedict's Prep (Newark, New Jersey); Advanced Prep International (Dallas, Texas); IMG Academy (Bradenton, Florida)
- College: Duke (2017–2018)
- NBA draft: 2018: undrafted
- Playing career: 2018–present

Career history
- 2018–2019: Milwaukee Bucks
- 2018–2019: →Wisconsin Herd
- 2019: Rio Grande Valley Vipers
- 2019–2020: Iowa Wolves
- 2021: Hamilton Honey Badgers
- 2021–2023: Grand Rapids Gold
- 2023: Metros de Santiago
- 2023–2024: Manisa BB
- 2024–2025: Sabah BC
- 2026–present: Greensboro Swarm

Career highlights
- NBA G League champion (2019); McDonald's All-American (2017)
- Stats at NBA.com
- Stats at Basketball Reference

Trevon Tyler Anthony Duval (born August 3, 1998) is an American professional basketball player who last played for the Greensboro Swarm of the NBA G League. He played college basketball for the Duke Blue Devils.

== High school career ==
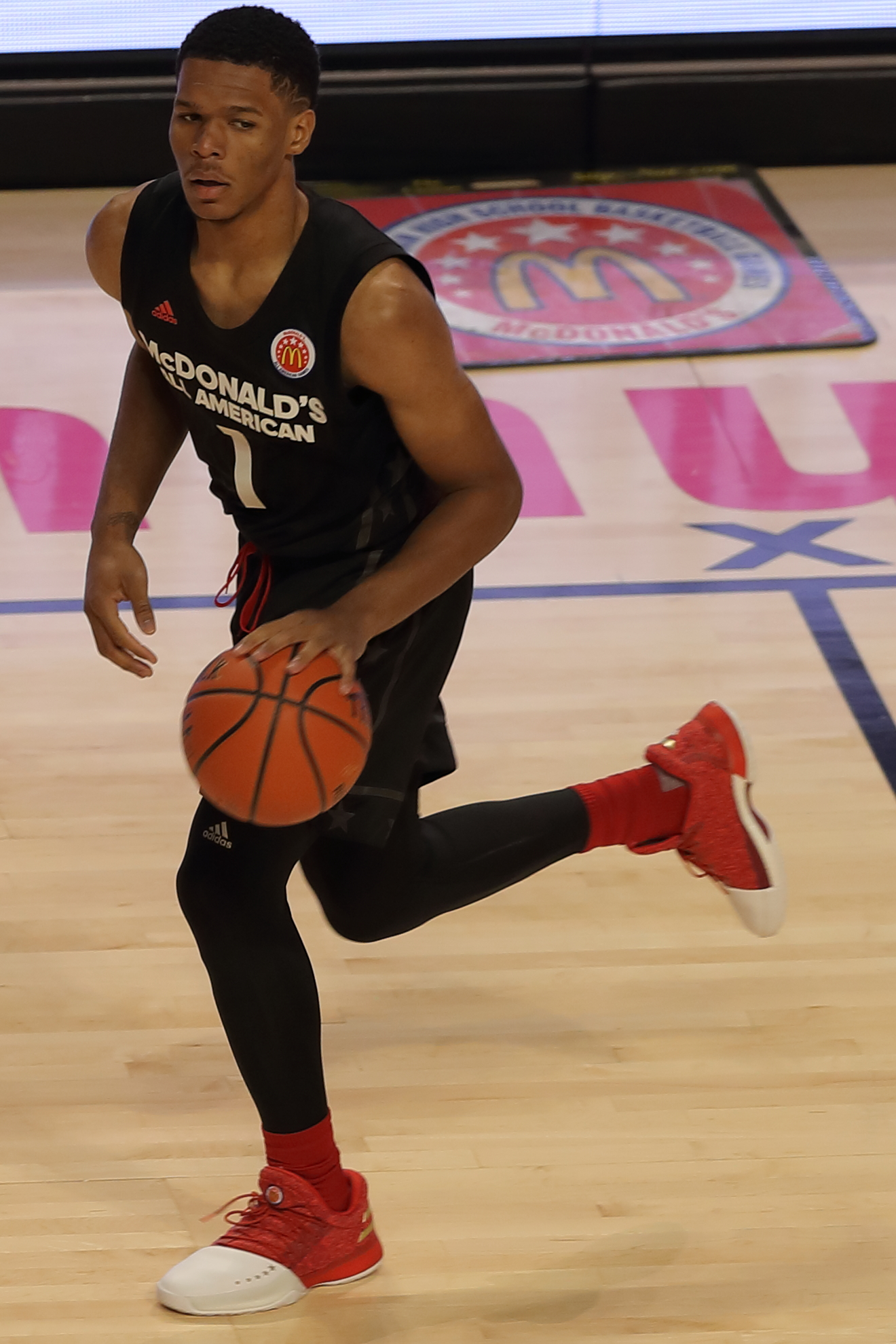
Duval at the 2017 McDonald's All-American Game

Duval attended St. Benedict's Preparatory School in Newark, New Jersey during his Freshman and Sophomore years. As a sophomore in 2014–15, Duval led the Gray Bees to a 31–6 record and NCSAA state championship in which he scored 25 points and had 8 assists. Prior to his sophomore year, Duval along with Isaiah Briscoe for the AAU team, New Jersey Playaz won the 2014 Nike Elite Youth Basketball League (EYBL) Peach Jam Championship. In September 2015, Duval transferred to Advanced Preparatory International in Dallas, Texas for his junior season. As a junior in 2015–16, Duval averaged 16.8 points per game and 7.0 assists per game. In the spring and summer of 2016, Duval competed in the Under Armour Association circuit for the AAU team, WE-R1. He led WE-R1 to an Under Armour Association Championship, becoming the first player to win both under armour and Nike peach jam championships. Duval averaged 16.3 points per game and 3.8 assists per game in the 2016 Under Armour Association circuit. Duval was then invited to the Under Armour Elite 24 in Brooklyn, New York, where Duval finished the game with 25 points and 7 assists leading team drive to 140–136 victory in overtime.

In late 2016, Duval transferred to IMG Academy in Bradenton, Florida. As a senior, Duval averaged 16.1 points per game and 7.5 assists per game leading IMG to a 26–2 record.

A consensus five-star recruit, he was selected to play in the McDonald's All-American Game and Jordan Brand Classic.

=== Recruiting ===
Duval was considered one of the best players in the 2017 recruiting class and was ranked as the No.6 recruit and No.1 point guard in 2017 high school class by Scout.com, Rivals, 247Sports, and ESPN. In 2015 he was considered by Scout as the third-ranked prospect in all of high school in their "Ultimate 100" list.

On May 15, 2017, Duval committed to attend and play for Duke University, joining fellow recruits Wendell Carter Jr., Gary Trent Jr., Jordan Tucker, and Marvin Bagley III later on that year.

College recruiting
| Name | Hometown | School | Height | Weight | Commit date |
|---|---|---|---|---|---|
| Trevon Duval; PG | New Castle, DE | IMG Academy (FL) | 6 ft 3 in (1.91 m) | 191 lb (87 kg) | May 15, 2017 |
| Trevon Duval; PG | Recruit ratings: Scout: Rivals: 247Sports: ESPN: (96) | | | | |
Overall recruit ranking: Scout: 7 Rivals: 5 247Sports: 7 ESPN: 6
Note: In many cases, Scout, Rivals, 247Sports, On3, and ESPN may conflict in their listings of height and weight.; In these cases, the average was taken. ESPN grades are on a 100-point scale.; Sources: "Duke 2017 Basketball Commitments". Rivals.; "2017 Duke Blue Devils Recruiting Class". ESPN.; "2017 Team Ranking". Rivals.

== College career ==
On November 11, Duval scored 15 points and had 12 assists in a 99–69 win over Utah Valley. On November 14, Duval achieved his second double-double in the season, scoring 17 points, 10 assists, and six steals in an 88–81 victory against Michigan State in the Champions Classic. On November 23, he scored 22 points while shooting 7-of-14 from the field helping the Blue Devils defeat Portland State 99–81. On November 29, Duval scored 15 points and 6 assist in a 91–81 win over Indiana in the ACC-Big Ten Challenge. On December 30, he scored 16 points and 4 assists in a 100–93 victory against Florida State. On January 15, Duval 17 points and 8 assists in an 83–75 victory over Miami. On March 15, Duval notched 19 points and 8 assists in an 89–67 win over Iona. On March 25, he scored 20 points and 6 assists in an 85–81 overtime loss against Kansas in the Elite 8.

In his freshman season at Duke, Duval saw at action in a total of 37 games (starting 34) as a freshman and averaged 10.9 points, 5.6 assists, and 2.0 rebounds per game. Duval's 207 assists was ranked fourth most in Duke history by a freshman, while his 5.6 assists per game ranked third on the Duke freshman list as well in the Atlantic Coast Conference (ACC).

Following Duke's loss in the 2018 NCAA men's basketball tournament, Duval announced his intention to forgo his final three seasons of collegiate eligibility and declare for the 2018 NBA draft.

== Professional career ==
=== Milwaukee Bucks (2018–2019) ===
On June 21, 2018, Duval did not get drafted by any team in the 2018 NBA draft. He was the first one-and-done player in Duke history to go undrafted. Afterwards, he signed with the Houston Rockets for the NBA Summer League. On July 24, Duval signed a two-way contract with the Milwaukee Bucks, his contract split time between the Bucks and their NBA G League affiliate, the Wisconsin Herd. Duval made his NBA debut on February 8, 2019, scoring two points and recording one assist in a win over the Dallas Mavericks. On March 24, 2019, the Bucks waived Duval, after he briefly appeared in just three games.

=== Rio Grande Valley Vipers (2019) ===
On March 26, 2019, Duval was claimed by the Houston Rockets on a two-way contract. He did not appear in a game for them during the regular season and his late signing ruled him ineligible for the playoffs. He instead spent the majority of his time signed to the Rockets in the G League with the Rio Grande Valley Vipers.

Duval played at the 2019 NBA Summer League in Las Vegas with the Houston Rockets.

=== Iowa Wolves (2019–2020) ===
On October 26, 2019, Duval was selected by the Iowa Wolves with the fifth overall pick in the first round of the 2019 NBA G League draft. On February 24, 2020, he posted 14 points, five rebounds, five assists, two blocks and one steal in a 152–148 loss to the South Bay Lakers.

=== Hamilton Honey Badgers (2021) ===
On June 7, 2021, Duval signed with the Hamilton Honey Badgers of the Canadian Elite Basketball League.

=== Grand Rapids Gold (2021–2023) ===
In October 2021, Duval was selected by the Grand Rapids Gold in the 2021 NBA G League draft. On December 15, he was waived. On December 30, he was reacquired by the Gold.

=== Metros de Santiago (2023) ===
On April 28, 2023, Duval signed with the Metros de Santiago of the Liga Nacional de Baloncesto.

=== Manisa Büyükşehir Belediyespor (2023–2024) ===
On November 17, 2023, he signed with Manisa BB of the Turkish Basketbol Süper Ligi.

=== Sabah BC (2024–2025) ===
On August 31, 2024, he signed with Sabah BC of the Azerbaijan Basketball League.

=== Greensboro Swarm (2026) ===
On March 9, 2026, the Greensboro Swarm announced that the team had acquired Trevon Duval from the NBA G League's available player pool.

As of the conclusion of the 2026 G League season, Duval is a free agent.

== National team career ==
Duval participated in the 2016, 2015 and 2014 USA Men's Junior National Team October minicamps.

== Career statistics ==
Legend
| GP | Games played | GS | Games started | MPG | Minutes per game |
| FG% | Field goal percentage | 3P% | 3-point field goal percentage | FT% | Free throw percentage |
| RPG | Rebounds per game | APG | Assists per game | SPG | Steals per game |
| BPG | Blocks per game | PPG | Points per game | **Bold** | Career high |

=== NBA ===
==== Regular season ====
| Year | Team | GP | GS | MPG | FG% | 3P% | FT% | RPG | APG | SPG | BPG | PPG |
|---|---|---|---|---|---|---|---|---|---|---|---|---|
| 2018–19 | Milwaukee | 3 | 0 | 2.0 | .667 | 1.000 | – | .3 | .7 | .0 | .0 | 1.7 |
| Career | | 3 | 0 | 2.0 | .667 | 1.000 | – | .3 | .7 | .0 | .0 | 1.7 |

=== College ===
| Year | Team | GP | GS | MPG | FG% | 3P% | FT% | RPG | APG | SPG | BPG | PPG |
|---|---|---|---|---|---|---|---|---|---|---|---|---|
| 2017–18 | Duke | 37 | 34 | 29.7 | .428 | .290 | .596 | 2.0 | 5.6 | 1.5 | .1 | 10.3 |
