= 2017–18 Southeastern Conference men's basketball season =

- League: NCAA Division I
- Sport: Basketball
- Teams: 14
- TV partner(s): CBS, ESPN, SEC Network

Regular Season
- 2018 SEC Champions: Auburn and Tennessee
- Season MVP: Yante Maten, Georgia and Grant Williams, Tennessee

Tournament
- Venue: Scottrade Center, St. Louis, Missouri
- Champions: Kentucky
- Runners-up: Tennessee
- Finals MVP: Shai Gilgeous-Alexander, Kentucky

Basketball seasons
- ← 2016–17 2018–19 →

2017–18 Southeastern Conference men's basketball standings
| | Conf. | | | | Overall |
| Team | W | | L | PCT | W | | L | PCT |
|---|---|---|---|---|---|---|---|---|
| No. 19 Auburn | 13 | – | 5 | .722 | 26 | – | 8 | .765 |
| No. 13 Tennessee | 13 | – | 5 | .722 | 26 | – | 9 | .743 |
| No. 23 Florida | 11 | – | 7 | .611 | 21 | – | 13 | .618 |
| No. 18 Kentucky † | 10 | – | 8 | .556 | 26 | – | 11 | .703 |
| Missouri | 10 | – | 8 | .556 | 20 | – | 13 | .606 |
| Arkansas | 10 | – | 8 | .556 | 23 | – | 12 | .657 |
| Mississippi State | 9 | – | 9 | .500 | 25 | – | 12 | .676 |
| Texas A&M | 9 | – | 9 | .500 | 22 | – | 13 | .629 |
| Alabama | 8 | – | 10 | .444 | 20 | – | 16 | .556 |
| LSU | 8 | – | 10 | .444 | 18 | – | 15 | .545 |
| Georgia | 7 | – | 11 | .389 | 18 | – | 15 | .545 |
| South Carolina | 7 | – | 11 | .389 | 17 | – | 16 | .515 |
| Vanderbilt | 6 | – | 12 | .333 | 12 | – | 20 | .375 |
| Ole Miss | 5 | – | 13 | .278 | 12 | – | 20 | .375 |
† 2018 SEC tournament winner Rankings from AP poll

The 2017–18 Southeastern Conference men's basketball season began with practices in October 2017, followed by the start of the 2017–18 NCAA Division I men's basketball season in November. Conference play started in early January 2018 and ended in March, after which 14 member teams participated in the 2018 SEC tournament at Scottrade Center in St. Louis, Missouri. The tournament champion was guaranteed a selection to the 2018 NCAA tournament.

== Preseason ==
SEC recruits at the 2017 McDonald's All-American Boys Game

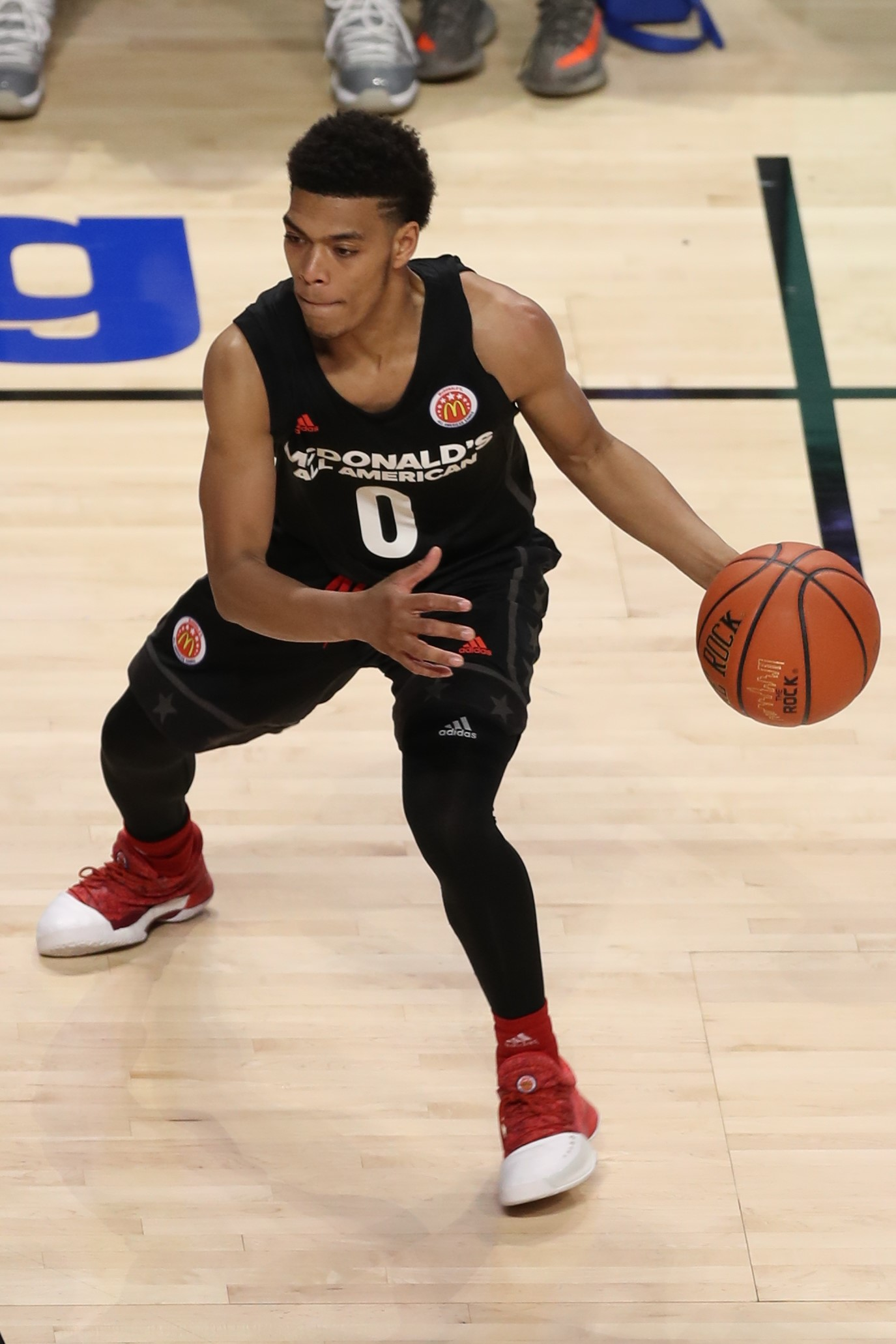
Quade Green, Kentucky

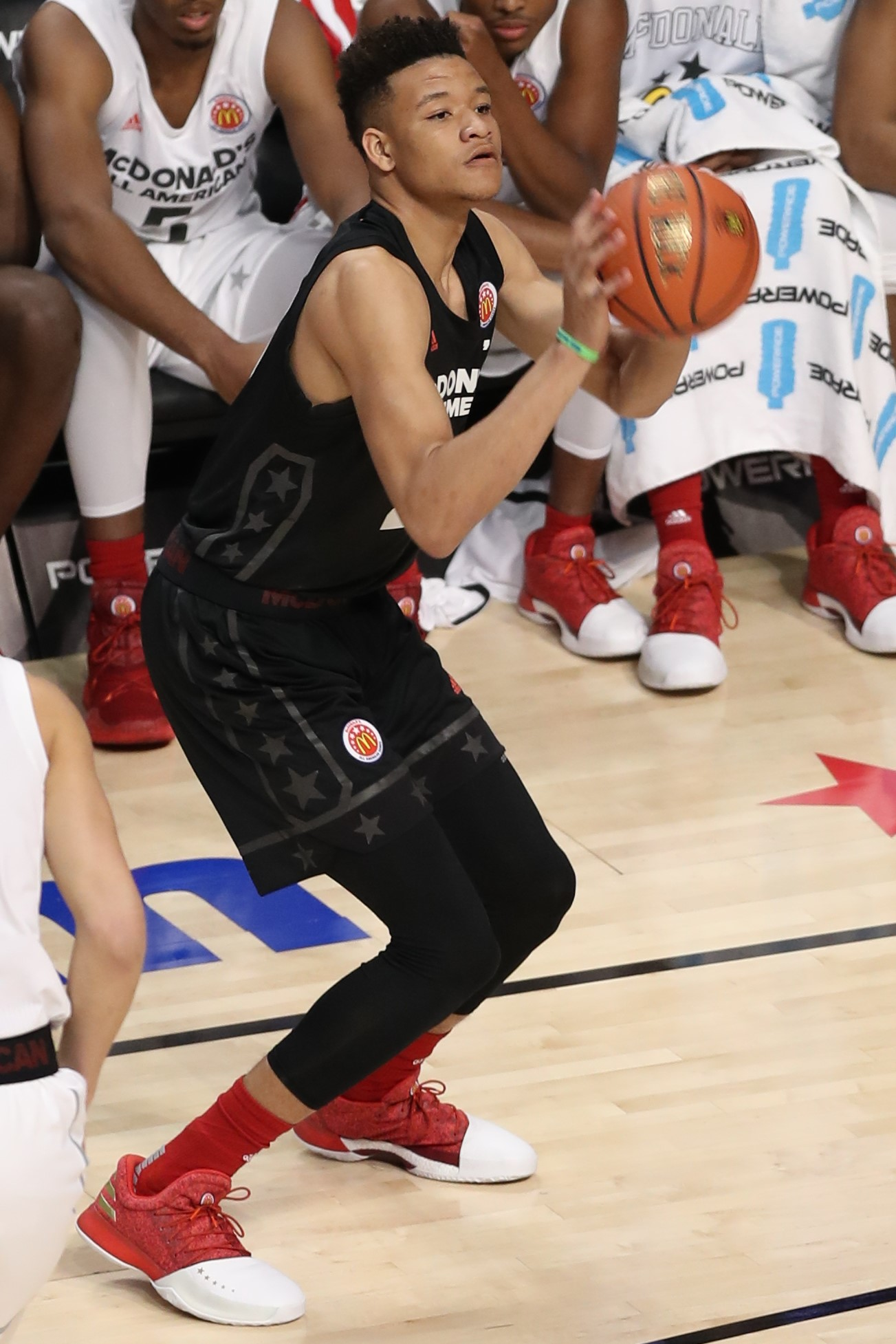
Kevin Knox II, Kentucky

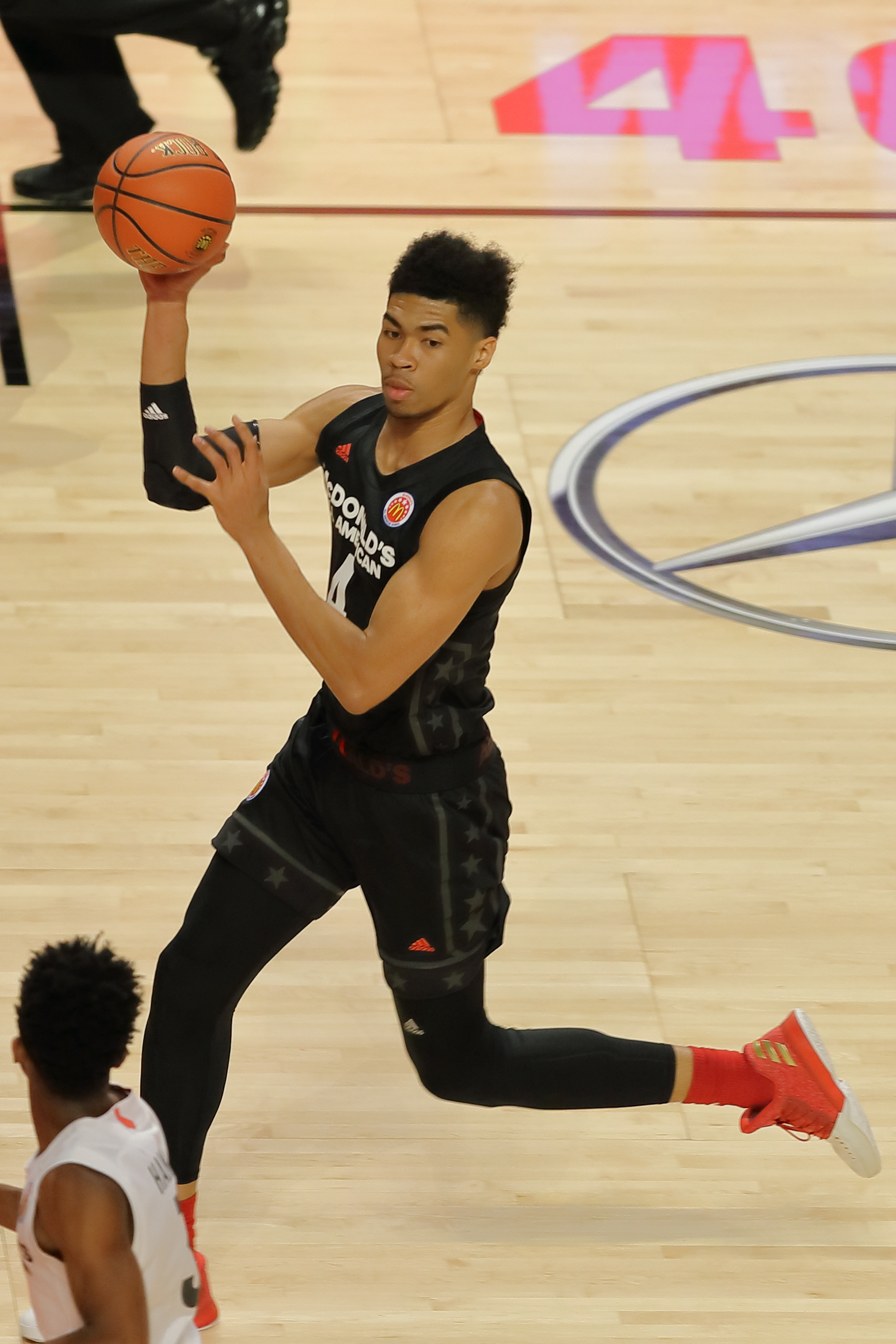
Nick Richards, Kentucky

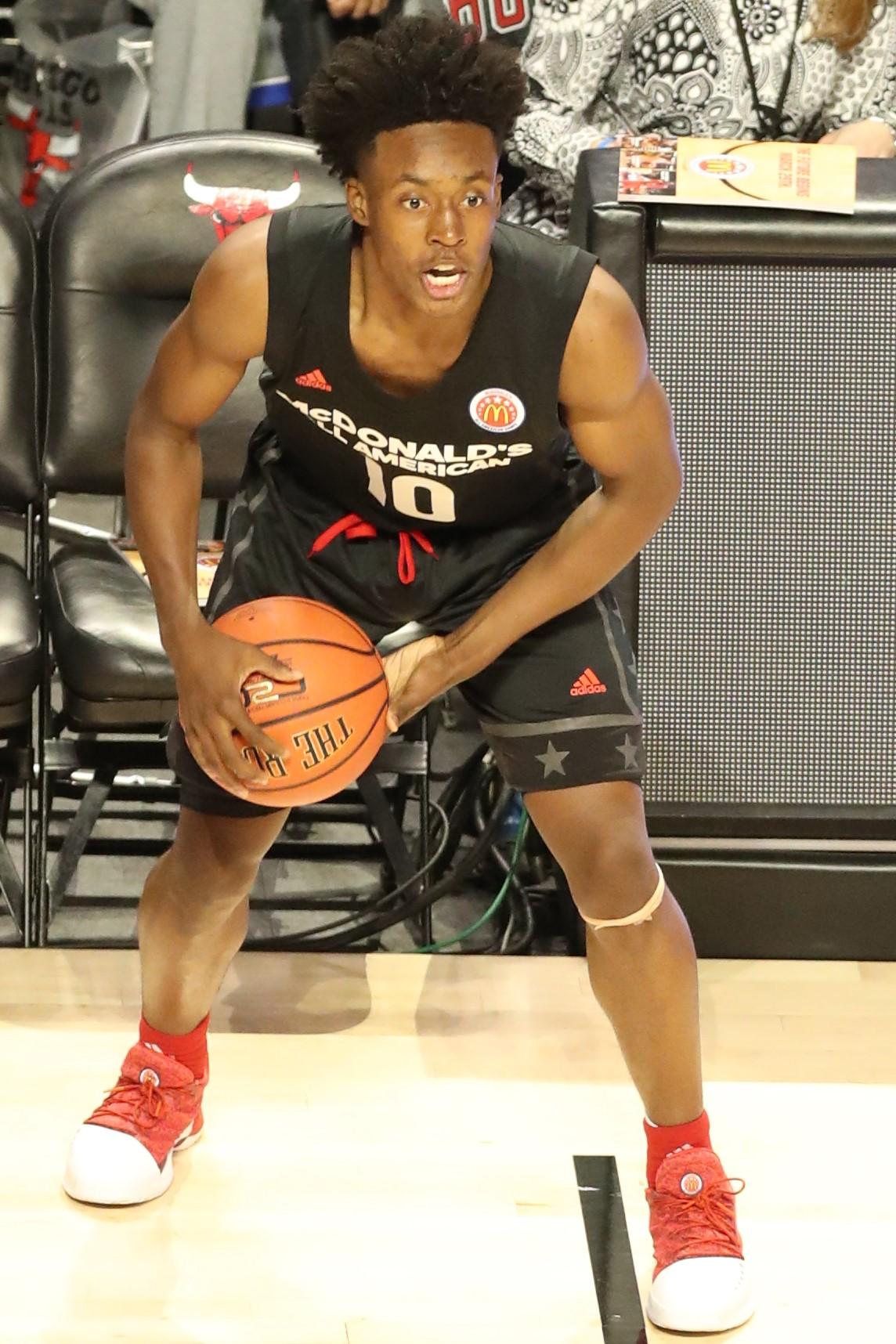
Collin Sexton, Alabama

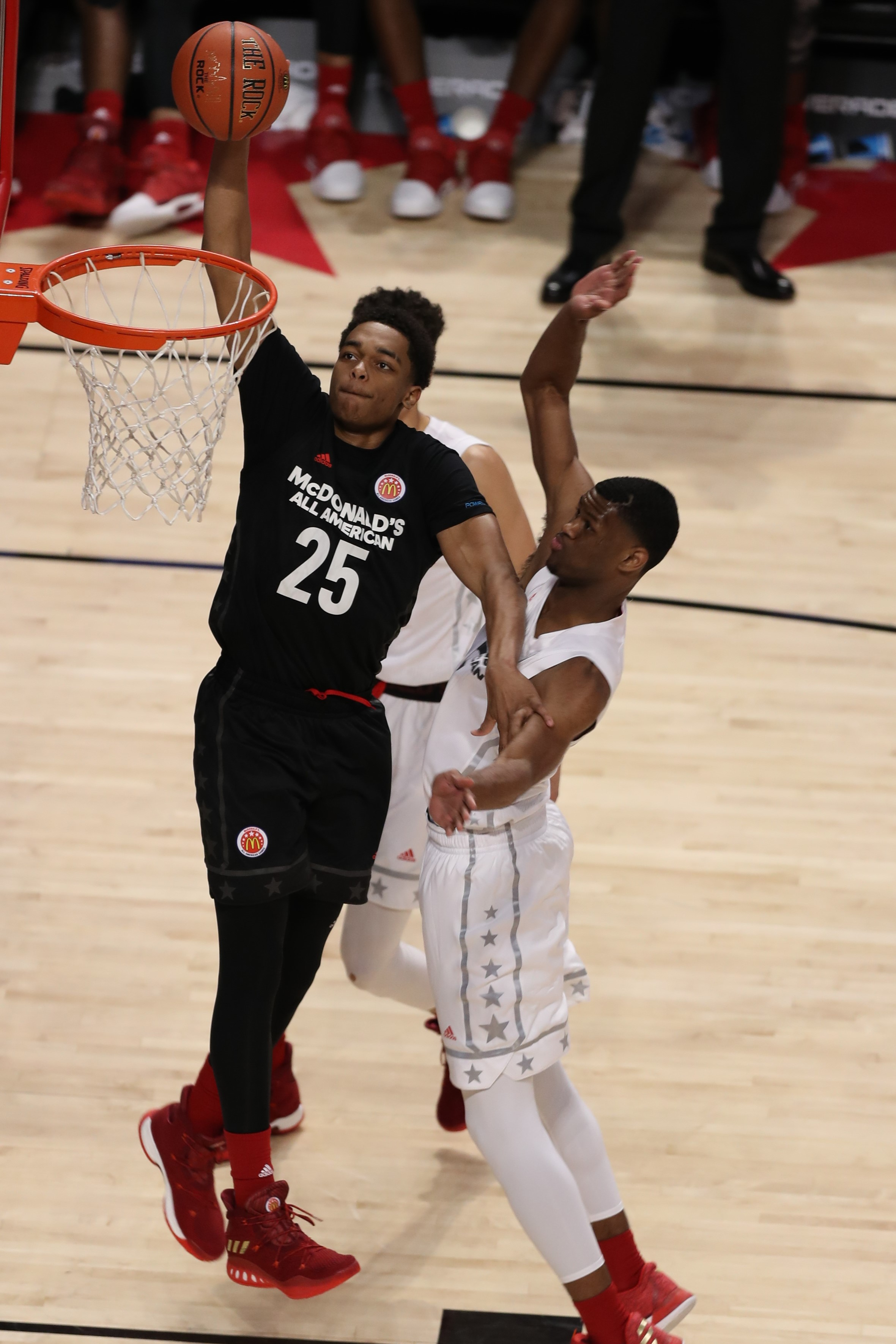
P. J. Washington, Kentucky

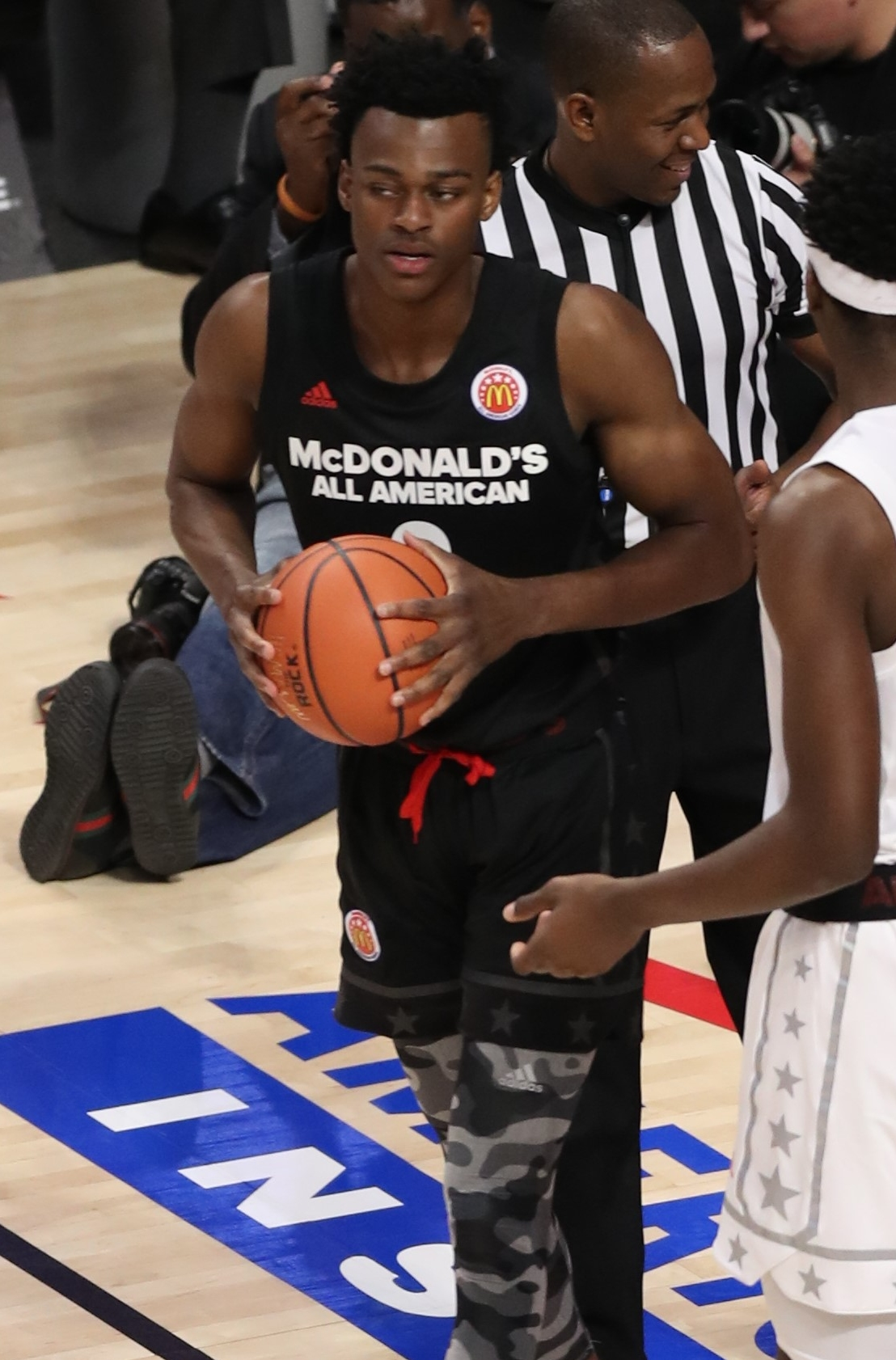
Jarred Vanderbilt, Kentucky

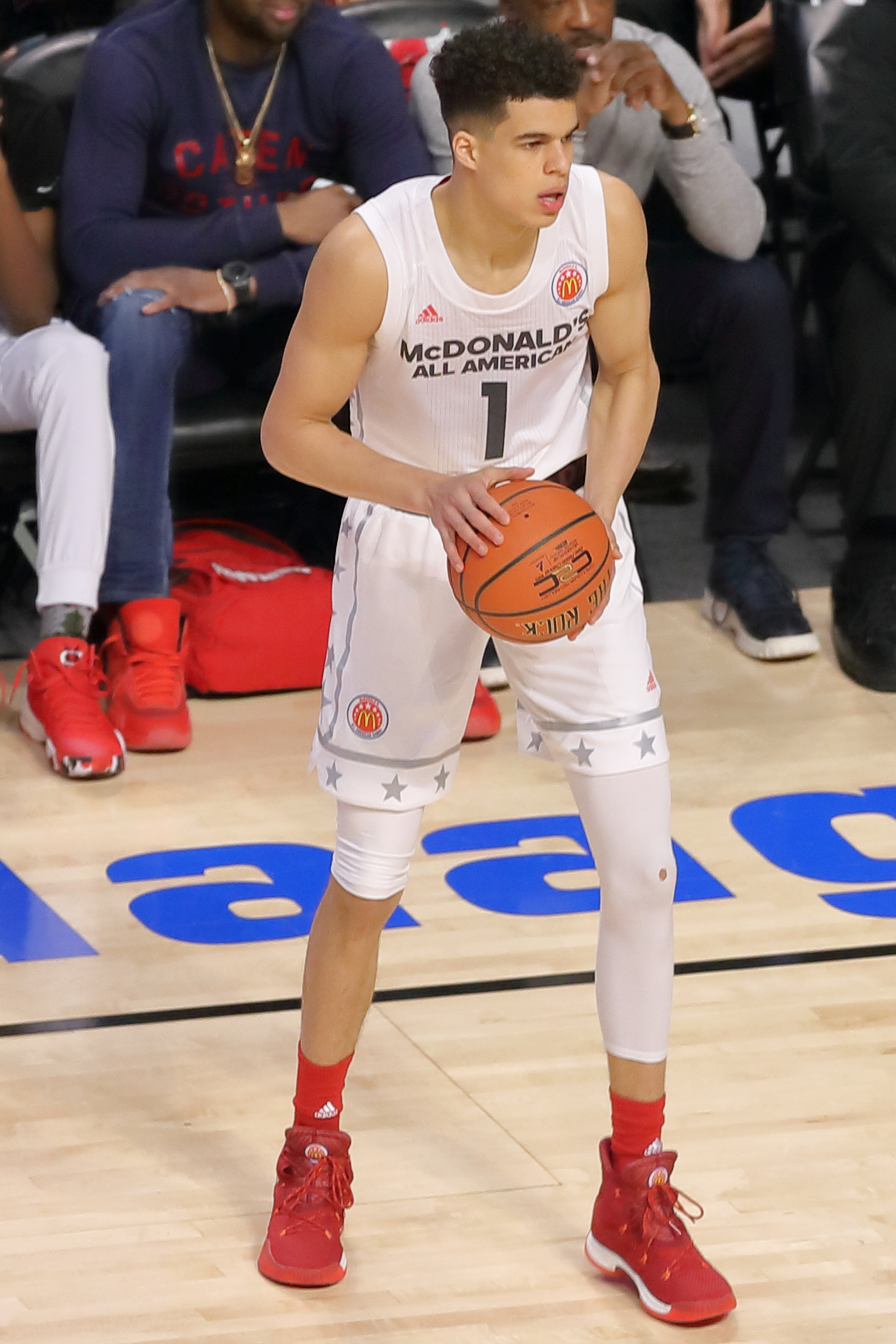
Michael Porter Jr., Missouri

=== Preseason polls ===
| | AP | Athlon; Sports | Bleacher; Report | Blue Ribbon; Yearbook | CBS Sports | Coaches | ESPN | FOX Sports | KenPom | Lindy's; Sports | NBC Sports | SBNation | Sporting; News | Sports; Illustrated | USBWA | Yahoo Sports |
| Alabama | RV | | | | #19 | #25 | #27 | | | | #23 | | | #21 | | |
| Arkansas | | | | | #36 | RV | #65 | | | | | | | #49 | | |
| Auburn | | | | | #66 | | #35 | | | | | | | #33 | | |
| Florida | #8 | | #10 | | #9 | #7 | #15 | | | | #7 | #9 | | #10 | | |
| Georgia | | | | | #53 | RV | #57 | | | | | | | #58 | | |
| Kentucky | #5 | | #6 | | #6 | #4 | #9 | | | | #8 | #6 | | #8 | | |
| LSU | | | | | #147 | | #88 | | | | | | | #91 | | |
| Mississippi State | | | | | #76 | | #69 | | | | | | | #48 | | |
| Missouri | RV | | | | #37 | RV | #71 | | | | | #25 | | #39 | | |
| Ole Miss | | | | | #88 | | #59 | | | | | | | #53 | | |
| South Carolina | RV | | | | #81 | RV | #40 | | | | | | | #61 | | |
| Tennessee | | | | | #118 | | #49 | | | | | | | #76 | | |
| Texas A&M | #25 | | #21 | | #27 | RV | #19 | | | | #19 | | | #29 | | |
| Vanderbilt | | | | | #46 | | #61 | | | | | | | #59 | | |

=== Media Day Selections ===
| | Media |
| 1. | Kentucky |
| 2. | Florida |
| 3. | Texas A&M |
| 4. | Alabama |
| 5. | Missouri |
| 6. | Arkansas |
| 7. | Vanderbilt |
| 8. | Georgia |
| 9. | Auburn |
| 10. | Ole Miss |
| 11. | South Carolina |
| 12. | Mississippi State |
| 13. | Tennessee |
| 14. | LSU |

() first place votes

=== Preseason All-SEC teams ===
| Media | Coaches |
|---|---|
| KeVaughn Allen Florida | KeVaughn Allen Florida |
| Hamidou Diallo Kentucky | Deandre Burnett Ole Miss |
| **Yante Maten Georgia** | Tyler Davis Texas A&M |
| **Michael Porter Jr. Missouri** | Matthew Fisher-Davis Vanderbilt |
| **Robert Williams Texas A&M** | Kevin Knox II Kentucky |
| | Michael Porter Jr. Missouri |
| | Quinndary Weatherspoon Mississippi State |
| | Robert Williams Texas A&M |

- Media select a five-member first team; coaches select an eight-member first team
- Players in bold are media choices for SEC Player of the Year; coaches do not select a preseason Player of the Year

== Head coaches ==
Note: Stats shown are before the beginning of the season. Overall and SEC records are from time at current school.

| Team | Head coach | Previous job | Season at school | Overall record | SEC record | NCAA Tournaments | NCAA Final Fours | NCAA Championships |
|---|---|---|---|---|---|---|---|---|
| Alabama | Avery Johnson | Brooklyn Nets | 3 | 37–30 (.552) | 18–18 (.500) | 0 | 0 | 0 |
| Arkansas | Mike Anderson | Missouri | 7 | 128–74 (.634) | 60–46 (.566) | 2 | 0 | 0 |
| Auburn | Bruce Pearl | Tennessee | 4 | 44–54 (.449) | 16–38 (.296) | 0 | 0 | 0 |
| Florida | Mike White | Louisiana Tech | 3 | 48–24 (.667) | 23–13 (.639) | 1 | 0 | 0 |
| Georgia | Mark Fox | Nevada | 9 | 145–118 (.551) | 70–68 (.507) | 2 | 0 | 0 |
| Kentucky | John Calipari | Memphis | 9 | 249–53 (.825) | 111–27 (.804) | 7 | 4 | 1 |
| LSU | Will Wade | VCU | 1 | 0–0 (–) | 0–0 (–) | 0 | 0 | 0 |
| Mississippi State | Ben Howland | UCLA | 3 | 30–33 (.476) | 13–23 (.361) | 0 | 0 | 0 |
| Missouri | Cuonzo Martin | California | 1 | 0–0 (–) | 0–0 (–) | 0 | 0 | 0 |
| Ole Miss | Andy Kennedy | Cincinnati | 12 | 234–139 (.627) | 98–88 (.527) | 2 | 0 | 0 |
| South Carolina | Frank Martin | Kansas State | 6 | 96–74 (.565) | 38–52 (.422) | 1 | 1 | 0 |
| Tennessee | Rick Barnes | Texas | 3 | 31–35 (.470) | 14–22 (.389) | 0 | 0 | 0 |
| Texas A&M | Billy Kennedy | Murray State | 7 | 115–85 (.575) | 51–57 (.472) | 1 | 0 | 0 |
| Vanderbilt | Bryce Drew | Valparaiso | 2 | 19–16 (.543) | 10–8 (.556) | 1 | 0 | 0 |

== Rankings ==
Legend
| Increase in ranking |
| Decrease in ranking |
| Not ranked previous week |

| | | Pre | Wk 2 | Wk 3 | Wk 4 | Wk 5 | Wk 6 | Wk 7 | Wk 8 | Wk 9 | Wk 10 | Wk 11 | Wk 12 | Wk 13 | Wk 14 | Wk 15 | Wk 16 | Wk 17 | Wk 18 | Wk 19 | Final |
|---|---|---|---|---|---|---|---|---|---|---|---|---|---|---|---|---|---|---|---|---|---|
| Alabama | AP | RV | RV | 25 | 24 | RV | RV | RV | | RV | | | | RV | RV | RV | RV | | | | |
| Alabama | C | 25 | 25 | RV | RV | RV | RV | RV | | RV | | | RV | RV | RV | RV | | | | | |
| Arkansas | AP | | RV | RV | RV | | RV | RV | RV | 22 | RV | | | | | | RV | RV | | | |
| Arkansas | C | RV | RV | RV | RV | | RV | RV | RV | 23 | RV | | | | | | RV | RV | | | |
| Auburn | AP | | | | | | | RV | RV | RV | 22 | 17 | 19 | 11 | 8 | 10 | 12 | 14 | | | |
| Auburn | C | | | | | | | | RV | RV | 24 | 20 | 19 | 13 | 9 | 11 | 13 | 15 | | | |
| Florida | AP | 8 | 8 | 7 | 6 | 5 | 22 | RV | RV | | RV | RV | 20 | 23 | RV | RV | | RV | | | |
| Florida | C | 7 (1) | 7 (1) | 7 | 6 | 5 | 22 | RV | RV | RV | RV | RV | 22 | 24 | RV | RV | RV | RV | | | |
| Georgia | AP | | | | RV | RV | RV | | | | RV | | | | | | | | | | |
| Georgia | C | RV | RV | RV | | RV | RV | | | | | | | | | | | | | | |
| Kentucky | AP | 5 | 7 | 8 | 7 | 8 | 8 | 7 | 16 | 17 | 21 | 18 | RV | 21 | 24 | RV | RV | 23 | | | |
| Kentucky | C | 4 | 4 | 8 | 7 | 7 | 5 | 6 | 15 | 14 | 20 | 16 | RV | 22 | 24 | RV | RV | 25 | | | |
| LSU | AP | | | | | | | | | | | | | | | | | | | | |
| LSU | C | | | | | | | | | | | | | | | | | | | | |
| Mississippi State | AP | | | | | RV | RV | | | RV | | | | | | | | | | | |
| Mississippi State | C | | | | | | RV | RV | RV | | RV | | | | | | | | | | |
| Missouri | AP | RV | RV | | | | | | | | | | | | | RV | RV | | | | |
| Missouri | C | RV | RV | RV | RV | RV | RV | RV | RV | RV | | | | | | | | | | | |
| Ole Miss | AP | | | | | | | | | | | | | | | | | | | | |
| Ole Miss | C | | | | | | | | | | | | | | | | | | | | |
| South Carolina | AP | RV | RV | | | | | | | | | | | | | | | | | | |
| South Carolina | C | RV | RV | RV | | | | | | | | | | | | | | | | | |
| Tennessee | AP | | | | RV | 24 | 20 | 21 | 19 | 23 | 24 | 21 | 22 | 18 | 15 | 18 | 19 | 16 | | | |
| Tennessee | C | | | | RV | RV | 20 | 20 | 20 | 22 | 23 | 21 | 21 | 19 | 14 | 17 | 19 | 17 | | | |
| Texas A&M | AP | 25 | 16 | 16 | 9 | 7 | 9 | 8 | 5 | 11 | RV | | | | | 21 | RV | | | | |
| Texas A&M | C | RV | RV | 19 | 10 | 9 | 10 | 9 | 6 | 13 | RV | | | | | RV | RV | RV | | | |
| Vanderbilt | AP | | | | | | | | | | | | | | | | | | | | |
| Vanderbilt | C | | | | | | | | | | | | | | | | | | | | |

== Regular season ==
=== SEC regular season ===
This table summarizes the head-to-head results between teams in conference play. Results updated through February 25, 2018.

| | Alabama | Arkansas | Auburn | Florida | Georgia | Kentucky | LSU | Miss. State | Missouri | Ole Miss | S. Carolina | Tennessee | Texas A&M | Vanderbilt |
| vs. Alabama | – | 1-0 | 1-1 | 0–1 | 1–0 | 1-0 | 0–2 | 1–1 | 1–0 | 1–0 | 0–1 | 0–1 | 0–1 | 1–0 |
| vs. Arkansas | 0–1 | – | 1–0 | 1–0 | 0–1 | 1-0 | 2–0 | 1–0 | 0–1 | 0–2 | 0–1 | 0–1 | 1-1 | 0–1 |
| vs. Auburn | 1-1 | 0–1 | – | 1-0 | 0–2 | 0–1 | 0–1 | 0–1 | 0–1 | 0–2 | 1-0 | 0–1 | 1–0 | 0–1 |
| vs. Florida | 1–0 | 0–1 | 0–1 | – | 2–0 | 0–1 | 0–1 | 0–1 | 0–1 | 1–0 | 1–1 | 1-0 | 0–1 | 1-1 |
| vs. Georgia | 0–1 | 1–0 | 2–0 | 0–2 | – | 1–0 | 0–2 | 1–0 | 1–0 | 0–1 | 2-0 | 0–1 | 0–0 | 1–0 |
| vs. Kentucky | 0–1 | 0–1 | 1–0 | 1–0 | 0–1 | – | 0–1 | 0–1 | 1-1 | 0–0 | 1–0 | 2–0 | 1–1 | 0–2 |
| vs. LSU | 2–0 | 0–2 | 1–0 | 1–0 | 2-0 | 1–0 | – | 0–0 | 0–1 | 0–1 | 0–0 | 1–0 | 0–2 | 1-1 |
| vs. Miss. State | 1–1 | 0–1 | 1–0 | 1–0 | 0–1 | 1–0 | 0–0 | – | 1–1 | 1-1 | 0–2 | 0–0 | 0–1 | 1–1 |
| vs. Missouri | 0–1 | 1–0 | 1–0 | 1–0 | 0–1 | 1-1 | 1-0 | 1–1 | – | 1-1 | 0–1 | 0–1 | 1–1 | 0–0 |
| vs. Ole Miss | 0–1 | 2–0 | 2–0 | 0–1 | 1–0 | 0–0 | 1–0 | 1-1 | 1-1 | – | 0–1 | 2-0 | 1–0 | 0–0 |
| vs. South Carolina | 1–0 | 1–0 | 1-1 | 1–1 | 0–2 | 0–1 | 0–0 | 2-0 | 1–0 | 1–0 | – | 2–0 | 1–0 | 0–1 |
| vs. Tennessee | 1–0 | 1–0 | 1–0 | 0–1 | 1-0 | 0–2 | 0–1 | 0–0 | 1–0 | 0–2 | 0–2 | – | 0–1 | 0–2 |
| vs. Texas A&M | 1–0 | 1-1 | 0–1 | 1–0 | 0–0 | 1–1 | 2–0 | 1-0 | 1–1 | 0–1 | 0–1 | 1–0 | – | 0–1 |
| vs. Vanderbilt | 0–1 | 1–0 | 1–0 | 1-1 | 0–1 | 2–0 | 1-1 | 1–1 | 0–0 | 0–0 | 1–0 | 2–0 | 1-0 | – |
| Total | 8–8 | 9–7 | 12–4 | 9–7 | 7–9 | 9–7 | 7–9 | 9–7 | 8–8 | 5–11 | 6–10 | 11–5 | 7–9 | 5–11 |

=== Records against other conferences ===
2017-18 records against non-conference foes as of January 27, 2018:

Regular Season

| Power Conferences | Record |
|---|---|
| ACC | 6–9 |
| American | 8–5 |
| Big East | 2–3 |
| Big Ten | 4–2 |
| Big 12 | 10–8 |
| Pac-12 | 2–7 |
| Power 7 Total | 32–34 |
| Other NCAA Division I Conferences | Record |
| America East | 2–0 |
| Atlantic 10 | 6–1 |
| Atlantic Sun | 6–0 |
| Big Sky | 0–0 |
| Big South | 8–0 |
| Big West | 3–0 |
| CAA | 3–0 |
| Conference USA | 7–2 |
| Horizon League | 4–0 |
| Ivy League | 2–0 |
| MAAC | 1–0 |
| MAC | 4–0 |
| MEAC | 3–0 |
| MVC | 2–3 |
| Mountain West | 3–1 |
| NEC | 2–0 |
| OVC | 6–1 |
| Patriot League | 1–0 |
| SoCon | 7–0 |
| Southland | 8–1 |
| SWAC | 5–0 |
| Summit League | 3–1 |
| Sun Belt | 7–0 |
| WAC | 3–0 |
| WCC | 4–0 |
| Other Division I Total | 104–10 |
| NCAA Division I Total | 136–44 |
| Division II Total | 3–0 |
| Total | 139–44 |

== Postseason ==
=== SEC Tournament ===
- March 7–11 at the Scottrade Center, St. Louis. Teams will be seeded by conference record, with ties broken by record between the tied teams followed by record against the regular-season champion, if necessary.

2016 SEC men's basketball tournament seeds and results
| Seed | School | Conf. | Over. | Tiebreaker | First Round March 7 | Second Round March 8 | Quarterfinals March 9 | Semifinals March 10 | Championship March 11 |
| 1. | ‡Auburn | 13–5 | 25–6 | 1–0 vs. Tennessee | Bye | Bye | vs. #9 Alabama L, 63–81 | | |
| 2. | †Tennessee | 13–5 | 23–7 | 0–1 vs. Auburn | Bye | Bye | vs. #7 Mississippi State W, 62–59 | vs. #6 Arkansas W, 84–66 | vs. #4 Kentucky L, 72–77 |
| 3. | †Florida | 11–7 | 20–11 | | Bye | Bye | vs. #6 Arkansas L, 72–80 | | |
| 4. | †Kentucky | 10–8 | 21–10 | 2–1 vs. Ark/Mizz | Bye | Bye | vs. #12 Georgia W, 62–49 | vs. #9 Alabama W, 86–63 | vs. #2 Tennessee W, 77–72 |
| 5. | #Missouri | 10–8 | 20–11 | 2–2 vs Ark/UK | Bye | vs. #12 Georgia L, 60–62 | | | |
| 6. | #Arkansas | 10–8 | 21–10 | 1–2 vs. UK/Mizz | Bye | vs. #11 South Carolina W, 69–64 | vs. #3 Florida W, 80–72 | vs. #2 Tennessee L, 66–84 | |
| 7. | #Mississippi State | 9–9 | 21–10 | 1–0 vs. Texas A&M | Bye | vs. #10 LSU W, 80–77 | vs. #2 Tennessee L, 59–62 | | |
| 8. | #Texas A&M | 9–9 | 20–11 | 0–1 vs. Mississippi State | Bye | vs. #9 Alabama L, 70–71 | | | |
| 9. | #Alabama | 8–10 | 17–14 | 2–0 vs. LSU | Bye | vs. #8 Texas A&M W, 71–70 | vs. #1 Auburn W, 81–63 | vs. #4 Kentucky L, 63–86 | |
| 10. | #LSU | 8–10 | 17–14 | 0–2 vs. Alabama | Bye | vs. #7 Mississippi State L, 77–80 | | | |
| 11. | #South Carolina | 7–11 | 16–15 | 2–0 vs. Georgia | vs. #14 Ole Miss W, 85–84 | vs. #6 Arkansas L, 64–69 | | | |
| 12. | Georgia | 7–11 | 16–14 | 0–2 vs. South Carolina | vs. #13 Vanderbilt W, 78–62 | vs. #5 Missouri W, 62–60 | vs. #4 Kentucky L, 49–62 | | |
| 13. | Vanderbilt | 6–12 | 12–19 | | vs. #12 Georgia L, 62–78 | | | | |
| 14. | Ole Miss | 5–13 | 12–19 | | vs. #11 South Carolina L, 84–85 | | | | |
‡ – SEC regular season champions, and tournament No. 1 seed. † – Received a double-Bye in the conference tournament. # – Received a single-Bye in the conference tournament. Overall records include all games played in the SEC tournament.

=== NCAA tournament ===
| Seed | Region | School | First Round | Second Round | Sweet 16 |
|---|---|---|---|---|---|
| 3 | South | Tennessee | #14 Wright State W 73–47 (Dallas) | #11 Loyola–Chicago L 62–63 (Dallas) | |
| 4 | Midwest | Auburn | #13 Charleston W 62–58(San Diego) | #5 Clemson L 53–84 (San Diego) | |
| 5 | South | Kentucky | #12 Davidson W 78–73 (Boise) | #13 Buffalo W 95–75 (Boise) | #9 Kansas State L 58–61 (Atlanta) |
| 6 | East | Florida | #11 St. Bonaventure W 77–62 (Dallas) | #3 Texas Tech L 66–69 (Dallas) | |
| 7 | East | Arkansas | #10 Butler L 62–79 (Detroit) | | |
| 7 | West | Texas A&M | #10 Providence W 73–69 (Charlotte) | #2 North Carolina W 86–65 (Charlotte) | #3 Michigan L 72–99 (Los Angeles) |
| 8 | West | Missouri | #9 Florida State L 54–67 (Nashville) | | |
| 9 | East | Alabama | #8 Virginia Tech W 86–83 (Pittsburgh) | #1 Villanova L 58–81 (Pittsburgh) | |

=== National Invitation Tournament ===
| Seed | Bracket | School | 1st Round | 2nd Round |
|---|---|---|---|---|
| 3 | Saint Mary's | LSU | W 84–76 vs. #6 Louisiana – (Baton Rouge) | L 71–95 vs. #2 Utah – (Salt Lake City) |

== Honors and awards ==
=== Players of the Week ===
Throughout the conference regular season, the SEC offices named one or two players of the week and one or two freshmen of the week each Monday.

| Week | Player of the week | Freshman of the week |
|---|---|---|
| 1 | Admon Gilder, A&M | Tremont Waters, LSU |
| 2 | Egor Koulechov, UF | John Petty, BAMA |
| 3 | Jalen Hudson, UF | Collin Sexton, BAMA |
| 4 | Tyson Carter, MSU | Chuma Okeke, AUB |
| 5 | Duop Reath, LSU | Daniel Gafford, ARK |
| 6 | Daryl Macon, ARK | Hamidou Diallo, UK |
| 7 | Yante Maten, UGA | Savion Flagg, A&M |
| 8 | Daryl Macon (2), ARK | John Petty (2), BAMA |
| 9 | Mustapha Heron, AUB | Tremont Waters (2), LSU |
| 10 | Grant Williams, TENN | Shai Gilgeous-Alexander, UK |
| 11 | Jalen Hudson (2), UF | Daniel Gafford (2), ARK |
| 11 | Tyler Davis, A&M | Daniel Gafford (2), ARK |
| 12 | Daryl Macon (3), ARK | Kevin Knox II, UK |
| 12 | Mustapha Heron (2), AUB | Kevin Knox II, UK |
| 13 | Kassius Robertson, MIZ | Nick Weatherspoon, MSU |
| 14 | Kassius Robertson (2), MIZ | T. J. Starks, A&M |
| 15 | Jeff Roberson, VAN | Daniel Gafford (3), ARK |
| 16 | Lamar Peters, MSU | Jarred Vanderbilt, UK |
| 16 | Admiral Schofield, TENN | Jarred Vanderbilt, UK |

=== All-SEC Awards ===
==== Coaches ====
2018 SEC Men's Basketball Individual Awards
| Award | Recipient(s) |
| Player of the Year | Grant Williams, Tennessee |
| Coach of the Year | Rick Barnes, Tennessee |
| Defensive Player of the Year | Chris Silva, South Carolina & Robert Williams, Texas A&M |
| Freshman of the Year | Kevin Knox II, Kentucky & Collin Sexton, Alabama |
| Scholar-Athlete of the Year | Juwan Parker, Georgia |
| Sixth Man Award | Jontay Porter, Missouri & Lamonte Turner, Tennessee |

2018 SEC Men's Basketball All-Conference Teams
| First Team | Second Team | All-Freshman Team | All-Defensive Team |
| Jaylen Barford Sr., G, Arkansas; Chris Chiozza Sr., G, Florida; Tyler Davis Jr., C, Texas A&M; Kevin Knox Fr., F, Kentucky; Yante Maten Sr., F, Georgia; Kassius Robertson GS, G, Missouri; Chris Silva Sr., F, South Carolina; Grant Williams So., F, Tennessee | Bryce Brown Jr., G, Auburn; Shai Gilgeous-Alexander Fr., G, Kentucky; Jared Harper So., G, Auburn; Daryl Macon Sr., G, Arkansas; Admiral Schofield Jr., F, Tennessee; Collin Sexton Fr., G, Alabama; Jeff Roberson Sr., F, Vanderbilt; Quinndary Weatherspoon Jr., F, Miss State | Daniel Gafford Arkansas; Shai Gilgeous-Alexander Kentucky; Kevin Knox Kentucky; Jontay Porter Missouri; Collin Sexton Alabama; TJ Starks Texas A&M; Tremont Waters LSU; Nick Weatherspoon Miss State | Chris Chiozza Sr., G, Florida; Donta Hall Jr., F, Alabama; Anfernee McLemore So., F, Auburn; Chris Silva Sr., F, South Carolina; Robert Williams So., F, Texas A&M |
† - denotes unanimous selection

==== AP ====
2018 SEC Men's Basketball Individual Awards
| Award | Recipient(s) |
| Player of the Year | Yante Maten, Georgia |
| Coach of the Year | Rick Barnes, Tennessee |
| Newcomer of the Year | Collin Sexton, Alabama |

2018 SEC Men's Basketball All-Conference Teams
| First Team | Second Team |
| Bryce Brown Jr., G, Auburn; Daryl Macon Sr., G, Arkansas †Yante Maten Sr., F, Georgia; Collin Sexton Fr., G, Alabama †Grant Williams So., F, Tennessee | Jaylen Barford Sr., G, Arkansas; Chris Chiozza Sr., G, Florida; Jared Harper So., G, Auburn; Mustapha Heron So., G, Auburn; Kassius Robertson GS, G, Missouri |
† - denotes unanimous selection

== NBA draft ==
| PG | Point guard | SG | Shooting guard | SF | Small forward | PF | Power forward | C | Center |

| Player | Team | Round | Pick # | Position | School |
|---|---|---|---|---|---|
| Collin Sexton | Cleveland Cavaliers | 1 | 8 | PG | Alabama |
| Kevin Knox II | New York Knicks | 1 | 9 | SF | Kentucky |
| Shai Gilgeous-Alexander | Charlotte Hornets | 1 | 11 | PG | Kentucky |
| Michael Porter Jr. | Denver Nuggets | 1 | 14 | SF | Missouri |
| Robert Williams | Boston Celtics | 1 | 27 | PF/C | Texas A&M |
| Jarred Vanderbilt | Orlando Magic | 2 | 41 | SF | Kentucky |
| Hamidou Diallo | Brooklyn Nets | 2 | 45 | SG | Kentucky |

== Attendance ==
Note: teams that played more than 16 home games have a * by them

| Team | Arena | Capacity | Game 1 | Game 2 | Game 3 | Game 4 | Game 5 | Game 6 | Game 7 | Game 8 | Total | Average | % of Capacity |
| Team | Arena | Capacity | Game 9 | Game 10 | Game 11 | Game 12 | Game 13 | Game 14 | Game 15 | Game 16 | Total | Average | % of Capacity |
|---|---|---|---|---|---|---|---|---|---|---|---|---|---|
| Alabama | Coleman Coliseum | 15,383 | 12,325 | 11,948 | 11,737 | 12,062 | 13,534 | 12,807 | 14,218 | 10,909 | 199,891 | 13,326 | 87% |
| Alabama | Coleman Coliseum | 15,383 | 15,383 | 15,383 | 15,383 | 15,383 | 11,154 | 15,383 | 12,282 | | 199,891 | 13,326 | 87% |
| *Arkansas | Bud Walton Arena | 19,368 | 13,407 | 13,404 | 15,051 | 13,634 | 17,583 | 13,945 | 15,829 | 18,696 | 275,084 | 16,181 | 84% |
| *Arkansas | Bud Walton Arena | 19,368 | 15,199 | 18,297 | 18,030 | 18,057 | 14,956 | 17,083 | 18,097 | 18,083 | 275,084 | 16,181 | 84% |
| Auburn | Auburn Arena | 9,121 | 7,419 | 7,197 | 6,164 | 6,232 | 7,565 | 8,039 | 8,493 | 8,950 | 131,537 | 8,221 | 90% |
| Auburn | Auburn Arena | 9,121 | 9,121 | 9,121 | 9,121 | 9,121 | 7,631 | 9,121 | 9,121 | 9,121 | 131,537 | 8,221 | 90% |
| Florida | O'Connell Center | 10,133 | 8,604 | 9,151 | 9,501 | 10,425 | 9,012 | 8,203 | 8,021 | 10,274 | 155,118 | 9,695 | 96% |
| Florida | O'Connell Center | 10,133 | 9,917 | 10,151 | 10,623 | 10,845 | 9,833 | 9,497 | 10,503 | 10,558 | 155,118 | 9,695 | 96% |
| Georgia | Stegeman Coliseum | 10,523 | 7,387 | 5,369 | 6,220 | 6,405 | 10,048 | 10,523 | 7,515 | 10,523 | 125,448 | 8,363 | 79% |
| Georgia | Stegeman Coliseum | 10,523 | 9,788 | 6,405 | 8,779 | 10,523 | 10,028 | 9,518 | 6,417 | | 125,448 | 8,363 | 79% |
| *Kentucky | Rupp Arena | 23,500 | 19,807 | 20,174 | 20,168 | 19,548 | 20,645 | 20,212 | 22,922 | 22,690 | 393,743 | 21,875 | 93% |
| *Kentucky | Rupp Arena | 23,500 | 24,228 | 22,862 | 22,643 | 24,394 | 20,609 | 21,143 | 23,332 | 23,220 | 393,743 | 21,875 | 93% |
| *LSU | Pete Maravich Assembly Center | 13,215 | 11,856 | 7,731 | 7,396 | 7,812 | 8,449 | 9,695 | 8,151 | 8,212 | 160,633 | 9,449 | 72% |
| *LSU | Pete Maravich Assembly Center | 13,215 | 11,952 | 13,600 | 13,215 | 8,528 | 9,272 | 8,545 | 9,635 | 7,517 | 160,633 | 9,449 | 72% |
| *Mississippi State | Humphrey Coliseum | 10,575 | 6,811 | 6,132 | 6,359 | 7,687 | 6,034 | 5,831 | 7,539 | 6,613 | 142,786 | 7,139 | 68% |
| *Mississippi State | Humphrey Coliseum | 10,575 | 6,709 | 7,156 | 7,764 | 6,324 | 8,443 | 6,633 | 7,169 | 7,775 | 142,786 | 7,139 | 68% |
| Missouri | Mizzou Arena | 15,061 | 15,061 | 15,061 | 15,061 | 15,061 | 15,061 | 15,061 | 15,061 | 15,061 | 240,976 | 15,061 | 100% |
| Missouri | Mizzou Arena | 15,061 | 15,061 | 15,061 | 15,061 | 15,061 | 15,061 | 15,061 | 15,061 | 15,061 | 240,976 | 15,061 | 100% |
| *Ole Miss | The Pavilion at Ole Miss | 9,500 | 8,302 | 7,042 | 6,835 | 6,014 | 6,297 | 5,054 | 6,309 | 6,102 | 125,051 | 6,947 | 73% |
| *Ole Miss | The Pavilion at Ole Miss | 9,500 | 7,993 | 5,849 | 8,664 | 6,547 | 8,099 | 9,121 | 6,204 | 6,023 | 125,051 | 6,947 | 73% |
| South Carolina | Colonial Life Arena | 18,000 | 12,136 | 10,832 | 10,205 | 11,734 | 11,305 | 11,391 | 16,200 | 18,000 | 183,267 | 13,091 | 73% |
| South Carolina | Colonial Life Arena | 18,000 | 18,000 | 11,042 | 14,629 | 14,995 | 11,529 | 11,269 | | | 183,267 | 13,091 | 73% |
| Tennessee | Thompson–Boling Arena | 21,678 | 15,047 | 12,343 | 13,642 | 14,051 | 21,678 | 13,095 | 14,755 | 21,678 | 242589 | 16,173 | 75% |
| Tennessee | Thompson–Boling Arena | 21,678 | 19,612 | 14,127 | 13,425 | 18,316 | 13,126 | 16,016 | 21,678 | | 242589 | 16,173 | 75% |
| Texas A&M | Reed Arena | 12,989 | 7,275 | 6,704 | 7,121 | 7,804 | 6,339 | 6,595 | 6,554 | 12,524 | 145,940 | 9,121 | 70% |
| Texas A&M | Reed Arena | 12,989 | 10,845 | 10,578 | 11,704 | 8,761 | 10,504 | 13,263 | 8,614 | 10,755 | 145,940 | 9,121 | 70% |
| *Vanderbilt | Memorial Gymnasium | 14,316 | 8,609 | 8,048 | 8,284 | 8,027 | 8,570 | 8,739 | 4,623 | 8,125 | 161,845 | 8,991 | 63% |
| *Vanderbilt | Memorial Gymnasium | 14,316 | 9,519 | 11,510 | 13,389 | 8,760 | 9,755 | 8,761 | 8,592 | 10,346 | 161,845 | 8,991 | 63% |
