= 2017–18 Florida Gators men's basketball team =

American college basketball season

2017–18 Florida Gators men's basketball

NCAA tournament, Second Round
- Conference: Southeastern Conference

Ranking
- AP: No. 23
- Record: 21–13 (11–7 SEC)
- Head coach: Mike White (3rd season)
- Assistant coaches: Dusty May; Jordan Mincy; Darris Nichols
- Home arena: Exactech Arena at the Stephen C. O'Connell Center

2017–18 Southeastern Conference men's basketball standings
	Conf.				Overall
Team	W		L	PCT	W		L	PCT
No. 19 Auburn	13	–	5	.722	26	–	8	.765
No. 13 Tennessee	13	–	5	.722	26	–	9	.743
No. 23 Florida	11	–	7	.611	21	–	13	.618
No. 18 Kentucky †	10	–	8	.556	26	–	11	.703
Missouri	10	–	8	.556	20	–	13	.606
Arkansas	10	–	8	.556	23	–	12	.657
Mississippi State	9	–	9	.500	25	–	12	.676
Texas A&M	9	–	9	.500	22	–	13	.629
Alabama	8	–	10	.444	20	–	16	.556
LSU	8	–	10	.444	18	–	15	.545
Georgia	7	–	11	.389	18	–	15	.545
South Carolina	7	–	11	.389	17	–	16	.515
Vanderbilt	6	–	12	.333	12	–	20	.375
Ole Miss	5	–	13	.278	12	–	20	.375
† 2018 SEC tournament winner Rankings from AP poll

The 2017–18 Florida Gators men's basketball team represented the University of Florida in the 2017–18 NCAA Division I men's basketball season. The Gators were led by third year head coach Mike White and played their home games in the Exactech Arena at the Stephen C. O'Connell Center on the university's Gainesville, Florida, campus as members of the Southeastern Conference. They finished the season 21–13, 11–7 in SEC play to finish in third place. They lost in the quarterfinals of the SEC tournament to Arkansas, 80–72. They received an at-large bid to the NCAA tournament where they defeated St. Bonaventure, 77–62, in the First Round before losing to Texas Tech, 69–66, in the Second Round.

== Previous season ==
The Gators finished the 2016–17 season 27–9, 14–4 in SEC play to finish in second place. They lost in the quarterfinals of the SEC tournament in overtime to 7-seed Vanderbilt. They received an at-large bid to the NCAA tournament as the East Region's No. 4 seed. They defeated 13-seed East Tennessee State and 5-seed Virginia to advance to the Sweet Sixteen. In the Sweet Sixteen, they defeated 8-seed Wisconsin with a three-pointer at the buzzer in overtime to earn a trip to the Elite Eight. In the Elite Eight, they lost to fellow SEC member 7-seed South Carolina.

== Offseason ==
=== Departures ===
Name	Number	Pos.	Height	Weight	Year	Hometown	Reason for departure
Kasey Hill	0	G	6'1"	175	Senior	Umatilla, FL	Graduated
Devin Robinson	1	F	6'8"	200	Junior	Chesterfield, VA	Declare for 2017 NBA draft
Eric Hester	2	G	6'3"	167	Freshman	Clearwater, FL	Transferred to Akron
Justin Leon	23	F	6'8"	206	Senior	Conway, AR	Graduated
Canyon Barry	24	G	6'6"	215	RS Senior	Colorado Springs, CO	Completed athletic eligibility; graduated from Charleston in 2016
Schuyler Rimmer	32	C	6'10"	249	RS Senior	Orlando, FL	Graduated

=== Incoming transfers ===
Name	Number	Pos.	Height	Weight	Year	Hometown	Previous School
Egor Koulechov	4	G/F	6'5"	210	RS Senior	Volgograd, Russia	Graduate transferred from Rice

=== 2017 recruiting class ===
College recruiting information
Name	Hometown	School	Height	Weight	Commit date
DeAundre Ballard; SF	Atlanta, GA	Southwest Atlanta Christian Academy	6 ft 6 in (1.98 m)	170 lb (77 kg)	Apr 18, 2016
DeAundre Ballard; SF	Recruit ratings: Scout: Rivals: 247Sports: (85)				
Chase Johnson; PF	Ripley, WV	Huntington Prep	6 ft 8 in (2.03 m)	205 lb (93 kg)	Oct 3, 2016
Chase Johnson; PF	Recruit ratings: Scout: Rivals: 247Sports: (80)				
Isaiah Stokes; C	Memphis, TN	IMG Academy	6 ft 8 in (2.03 m)	285 lb (129 kg)	Nov 30, 2016
Isaiah Stokes; C	Recruit ratings: Scout: Rivals: 247Sports: (85)				
Mike Okauru; PG	Raleigh, NC	Brewster Academy	6 ft 3 in (1.91 m)	175 lb (79 kg)	Dec 22, 2016
Mike Okauru; PG	Recruit ratings: Scout: Rivals: 247Sports: (79)				
Overall recruit ranking:
Note: In many cases, Scout, Rivals, 247Sports, On3, and ESPN may conflict in their listings of height and weight.; In these cases, the average was taken. ESPN grades are on a 100-point scale.; Sources: "2017 Florida Basketball Commits". Scout.; "Scout.com Team Recruiting Rankings". Scout.; "2017 Team Ranking". Rivals.

== Roster ==
2017–18 Florida Gators men's basketball team
Players
Coaches

Pos.	#	Name	Height	Weight	Year	Previous school	Hometown
G	0	Mike Okauru	6 ft 3 in (1.91 m)	180 lb (82 kg)	Fr	Brewster Academy	Raleigh, North Carolina
F	1	Chase Johnson	6 ft 9 in (2.06 m)	205 lb (93 kg)	Fr	Huntington Prep School	Ripley, West Virginia
F	2	Isaiah Stokes	6 ft 8 in (2.03 m)	270 lb (122 kg)	Fr	IMG Academy	Memphis, Tennessee
G	3	Jalen Hudson	6 ft 6 in (1.98 m)	190 lb (86 kg)	RS Jr	Virginia Tech	Richmond, Virginia
G/F	4	Egor Koulechov	6 ft 5 in (1.96 m)	205 lb (93 kg)	RS Sr	Rice	Volgograd, Russia
G	5	KeVaughn Allen	6 ft 2 in (1.88 m)	193 lb (88 kg)	Jr	North Little Rock High School	Little Rock, Arkansas
G	11	Chris Chiozza	6 ft 0 in (1.83 m)	175 lb (79 kg)	Sr	White Station High School	Memphis, Tennessee
F/C	12	Gorjok Gak	6 ft 11 in (2.11 m)	245 lb (111 kg)	So	Victory Rock Prep	Sydney, Australia
F/C	13	Kevarrius Hayes	6 ft 9 in (2.06 m)	225 lb (102 kg)	Jr	Suwannee High School	Live Oak, Florida
G	14	Mak Krause (W)	6 ft 2 in (1.88 m)	170 lb (77 kg)	Jr	St. Pius X Catholic High School	Atlanta, Georgia
C	15	John Egbunu	6 ft 11 in (2.11 m)	265 lb (120 kg)	RS Sr	South Florida	Bauchi, Nigeria
F	21	Dontay Bassett	6 ft 9 in (2.06 m)	240 lb (109 kg)	RS Fr	Oldsmar Christian School	Oakland, California
G	22	Andrew Fava (W)	5 ft 10 in (1.78 m)	165 lb (75 kg)	Fr	Loyola Blakefield	Baltimore, Maryland
G	24	Deaundrae Ballard	6 ft 5 in (1.96 m)	195 lb (88 kg)	Fr	Southwest Atlanta Christian Academy	Atlanta, Georgia
F	25	Keith Stone	6 ft 8 in (2.03 m)	240 lb (109 kg)	RS So	Zion Lutheran Christian School	Deerfield Beach, Florida

Head coach

- Mike White (Mississippi)

Assistant coach(es)

- Dusty May (Indiana)
- Jordan Mincy (Kent State)
- Darris Nichols (West Virginia)

Legend

- (C) Team captain
- (S) Suspended
- (I) Ineligible
- (W) Walk-on
- Injured
- Current redshirt

Roster

== Schedule and results ==
Date time, TV	Rank^{#}	Opponent^{#}	Result	Record	High points	High rebounds	High assists	Site (attendance) city, state
Exhibition
November 2, 2017*; 7:00 pm	No. 8	at Jacksonville; Fundraiser for Florida's First Coast Relief Fund	W 88–47		21 – Hudson	9 – Bassett	6 – Allen	Swisher Gym (1,542); Jacksonville, FL
November 5, 2017*; 2:00 pm, SECN+	No. 8	Tampa	W 94–57		18 – Hudson	7 – Tied	4 – Allen	O'Connell Center (8,023); Gainesville, FL
Regular season
November 13, 2017*; 7:00 pm, ESPNU	No. 8	Gardner–Webb	W 116–74	1–0	34 – Koulechov	7 – Gak	6 – Chiozza	O'Connell Center (8,604); Gainesville, FL
November 16, 2017*; 7:00 pm, SECN	No. 8	North Florida	W 108–68	2–0	18 – Allen	10 – Koulechov	7 – Chiozza	O'Connell Center (9,151); Gainesville, FL
November 19, 2017*; 6:00 pm, SECN	No. 8	New Hampshire; Phil Knight Invitational Campus Game	W 70–63	3–0	26 – Hudson	10 – Koulechov	1 – 3 tied	O'Connell Center (9,501); Gainesville, FL
November 23, 2017*; 10:00 pm, ESPN2	No. 7	vs. Stanford; Phil Knight Invitational Motion Bracket Quarterfinals	W 108–87	4–0	26 – Koulechov	4 – Allen	11 – Chiozza	Veterans Memorial Coliseum (7,878); Portland, OR
November 24, 2017*; 11:00 pm, ESPN2	No. 7	vs. No. 17 Gonzaga; Phil Knight Invitational Motion Bracket Semifinals	W 111–105 ^{2OT}	5–0	35 – Hudson	9 – Koulechov	10 – Chiozza	Moda Center (14,274); Portland, OR
November 26, 2017*; 10:30 pm, ESPN	No. 7	vs. No. 1 Duke; Phil Knight Invitational Motion Bracket Championship	L 84–87	5–1	24 – Hudson	10 – Hudson	7 – Chiozza	Moda Center (15,365); Portland, OR
December 4, 2017*; 9:00 pm, ESPN2	No. 5	Florida State; Rivalry	L 66–83	5–2	16 – Hudson	9 – Ballard	4 – Chiozza	O'Connell Center (10,425); Gainesville, FL
December 6, 2017*; 8:00 pm, SECN	No. 5	Loyola–Chicago	L 59–65	5–3	9 – Chiozza	9 – Koulechov	4 – Chiozza	O'Connell Center (9,012); Gainesville, FL
December 9, 2017*; 6:00 pm, ESPN2	No. 5	vs. No. 17 Cincinnati; Never Forget Tribute Classic	W 66–60	6–3	21 – Koulechov	7 – Koulechov	6 – Chiozza	Prudential Center (9,112); Newark, NJ
December 16, 2017*; 4:30 pm, FS2/FSFL	No. 22	vs. Clemson; Orange Bowl Basketball Classic	L 69–71	6–4	23 – Hudson	9 – Koulechov	3 – Tied	BB&T Center (9,152); Sunrise, FL
December 20, 2017*; 7:00 pm, SECN		James Madison	W 72–63	7–4	19 – Chiozza	7 – Hayes	7 – Chiozza	O'Connell Center (8,203); Gainesville, FL
December 22, 2017*; 7:00 pm, SECN		Incarnate Word	W 75–60	8–4	16 – Chozza	8 – Hayes	6 – Hudson	O'Connell Center (8,021); Gainesville, FL
December 30, 2017; 4:00 pm, ESPN2		Vanderbilt	W 81–74	9–4 (1–0)	22 – Koulechov	8 – Koulechov	3 – Chiozza	O'Connell Center (10,274); Gainesville, FL
January 2, 2018; 9:00 pm, ESPN2		at No. 11 Texas A&M	W 83–66	10–4 (2–0)	19 – Koulechov	7 – Hayes	9 – Chiozza	Reed Arena (12,524); College Station, TX
January 6, 2018; 1:00 pm, CBS		at Missouri	W 77–75	11–4 (3–0)	16 – Hudson	8 – Koulechov	6 – Chiozza	Mizzou Arena (15,061); Columbia, MO
January 10, 2018; 7:00 pm, SECN		Mississippi State	W 71–54	12–4 (4–0)	23 – Koulechov	8 – Tied	7 – Chiozza	O'Connell Center (9,917); Gainesville, FL
January 13, 2018; 1:00 pm, CBS		at Ole Miss	L 72–78	12–5 (4–1)	23 – Stone	11 – Koulechov	4 – Chiozza	The Pavilion at Ole Miss (6,457); Oxford, MS
January 17, 2018; 7:00 pm, ESPN2		Arkansas	W 88–73	13–5 (5–1)	28 – Allen	9 – Hudson	9 – Chiozza	O'Connell Center (9,929); Gainesville, FL
January 20, 2018; 8:15 pm, ESPN		at No. 18 Kentucky; Rivalry/College Gameday	W 66–64	14–5 (6–1)	17 – Hudson	9 – Tied	8 – Chiozza	Rupp Arena (24,394); Lexington, KY
January 24, 2018; 7:00 pm, SECN	No. 20	South Carolina	L 72–77	14–6 (6–2)	16 – Tied	8 – Koulechov	8 – Chiozza	O'Connell Center (10,151); Gainesville, FL
January 27, 2018*; 12:00 pm, ESPN	No. 20	Baylor; Big 12/SEC Challenge	W 81–60	15–6	20 – Chiozza	8 – Koulechov	6 – Chiozza	O'Connell Center (10,623); Gainesville, FL
January 30, 2018; 7:00 pm, SECN	No. 23	at Georgia	L 60–72	15–7 (6–3)	15 – Chiozza	7 – Koulechov	6 – Chiozza	Stegeman Coliseum (8,779); Athens, GA
February 3, 2018; 4:00 pm, ESPN	No. 23	Alabama	L 50–68	15–8 (6–4)	16 – Allen	5 – Tied	4 – Chiozza	O'Connell Center (10,845); Gainesville, FL
February 7, 2018; 6:30 pm, SECN		LSU	W 73–64	16–8 (7–4)	18 – Hudson	9 – Hudson	6 – Chiozza	O'Connell Center (9,833); Gainesville, FL
February 10, 2018; 12:00 pm, CBS		at South Carolina	W 65–41	17–8 (8–4)	12 – Tied	7 – 3 tied	3 – Tied	Colonial Life Arena (14,629); Columbia, SC
February 14, 2018; 9:00 pm, SECN		Georgia	L 69–72 ^{OT}	17–9 (8–5)	19 – Tied	7 – Hayes	5 – Chiozza	O'Connell Center (9,497); Gainesville, FL
February 17, 2018; 4:00 pm, ESPN2		at Vanderbilt	L 68–71	17–10 (8–6)	20 – Stone	7 – Koulechov	6 – Chiozza	Memorial Gymnasium (10,346); Nashville, TN
February 21, 2018; 9:00 pm, ESPN2		at No. 19 Tennessee	L 57–62	17–11 (8–7)	13 – Hudson	8 – Hayes	9 – Chiozza	Thompson–Boling Arena (16,016); Knoxville, FL
February 24, 2018; 8:30 pm, SECN		No. 12 Auburn	W 72–66	18–11 (9–7)	24 – Allen	6 – Tied	12 – Chiozza	O'Connell Center (10,503); Gainesville, FL
February 27, 2018; 7:00 pm, ESPN		at Alabama	W 73–52	19–11 (10–7)	27 – Hudson	9 – Chiozza	4 – Chiozza	Coleman Coliseum (12,282); Tuscaloosa, AL
March 3, 2018; 12:00 pm, CBS		No. 23 Kentucky; Rivalry	W 80–67	20–11 (11–7)	22 – Hudson	7 – Allen	7 – Allen	O'Connell Center (10,558); Gainesville, FL
SEC Tournament
March 9, 2018; 9:30 pm, SECN	(3) No. 23	vs. (6) Arkansas; Quarterfinals	L 72–80	20–12	22 – Stone	6 – Koulechov	6 – Chiozza	Scottrade Center (14,596); St. Louis, MO
NCAA tournament
March 15, 2018*; 9:57 pm, truTV	(6 E) No. 23	vs. (11 E) St. Bonaventure; First Round	W 77–62	21–12	20 – Koulechov	8 – Stone	11 – Chiozza	American Airlines Center (18,703); Dallas, Texas
March 17, 2018*; 8:40 pm, TNT	(6 E) No. 23	vs. (3 E) No. 14 Texas Tech; Second Round	L 66–69	21–13	23 – Hudson	10 – Stone	4 – Allen	American Airlines Center (18,642); Dallas, Texas
*Non-conference game. ^{#}Rankings from AP Poll. (#) Tournament seedings in parentheses. E=East Region. All times are in Eastern Time.

== Rankings ==
Ranking movements Legend: ██ Increase in ranking ██ Decrease in ranking — = Not ranked RV = Received votes ( ) = First-place votes
	Week																			
Poll	Pre	1	2	3	4	5	6	7	8	9	10	11	12	13	14	15	16	17	18	Final
AP	8	8	7	6	5	22	RV	RV	—	RV	RV	20	23	RV	RV	—	RV	23	23	Not released
Coaches	7 (1)	7	7	6	5	22	RV	RV	RV	RV	RV	22	24	RV	RV	—	RV	23	24	RV

*AP does not release post-NCAA tournament rankings

== See also ==
- 2017–18 Florida Gators women's basketball team
