= 2017–18 Missouri Tigers men's basketball team =

American college basketball season

2017–18 Missouri Tigers men's basketball

NCAA tournament, First Round
- Conference: Southeastern Conference
- Record: 20–13 (10–8 SEC)
- Head coach: Cuonzo Martin (1st season)
- Assistant coaches: Chris Hollender; Cornell Mann; Michael Porter Sr.
- Home arena: Mizzou Arena

2017–18 Southeastern Conference men's basketball standings
	Conf.				Overall
Team	W		L	PCT	W		L	PCT
No. 19 Auburn	13	–	5	.722	26	–	8	.765
No. 13 Tennessee	13	–	5	.722	26	–	9	.743
No. 23 Florida	11	–	7	.611	21	–	13	.618
No. 18 Kentucky †	10	–	8	.556	26	–	11	.703
Missouri	10	–	8	.556	20	–	13	.606
Arkansas	10	–	8	.556	23	–	12	.657
Mississippi State	9	–	9	.500	25	–	12	.676
Texas A&M	9	–	9	.500	22	–	13	.629
Alabama	8	–	10	.444	20	–	16	.556
LSU	8	–	10	.444	18	–	15	.545
Georgia	7	–	11	.389	18	–	15	.545
South Carolina	7	–	11	.389	17	–	16	.515
Vanderbilt	6	–	12	.333	12	–	20	.375
Ole Miss	5	–	13	.278	12	–	20	.375
† 2018 SEC tournament winner Rankings from AP poll

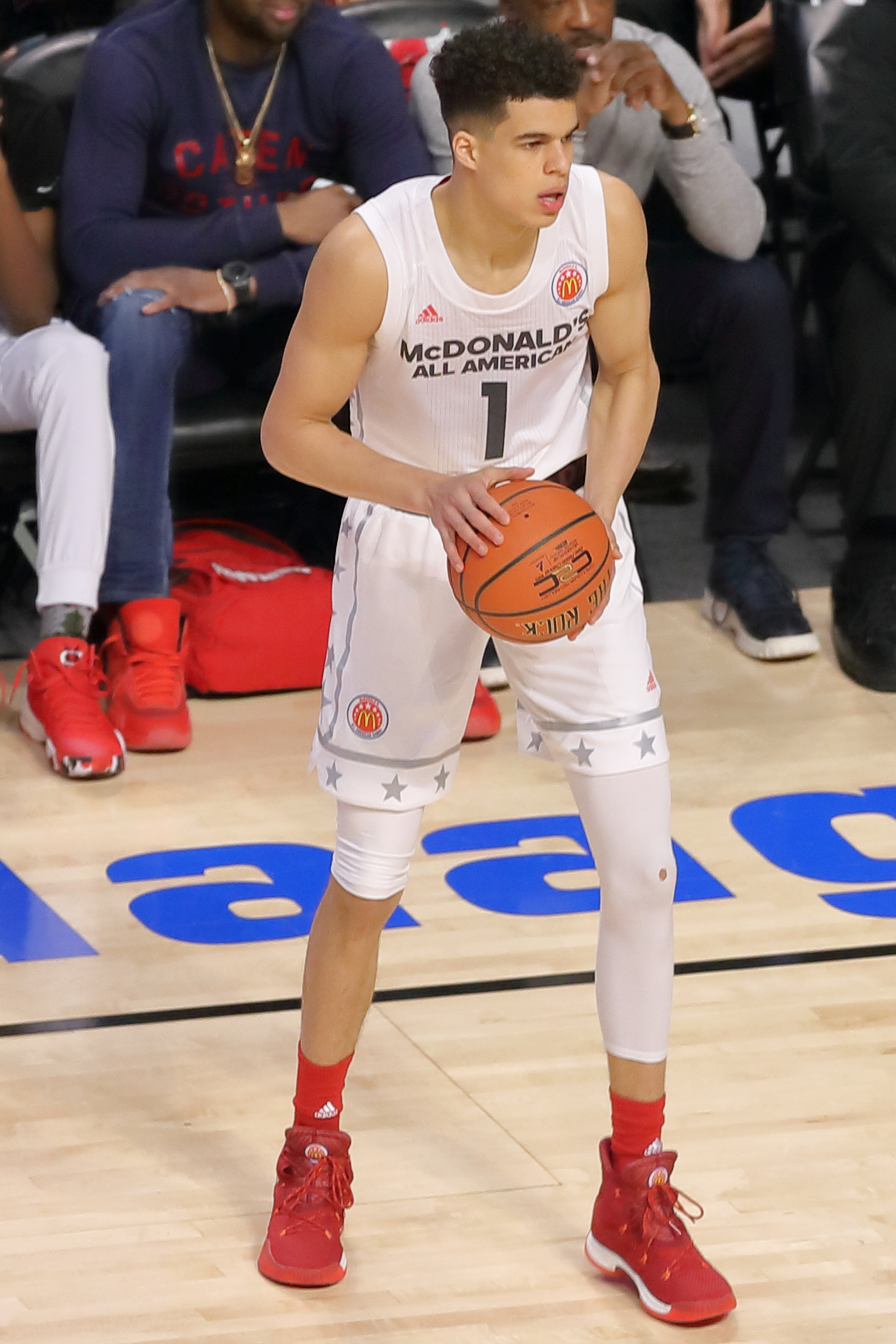
Missouri commit Michael Porter Jr. at the 2017 McDonald's All-American Boys Game

The 2017–18 Missouri Tigers men's basketball team represented the University of Missouri in the 2017–18 NCAA Division I men's basketball season. They were led by head coach Cuonzo Martin, who was in his first year at Missouri. The team played its home games at Mizzou Arena in Columbia, Missouri as sixth-year members of the Southeastern Conference.

On October 22, 2017, the Tigers renewed their rivalry against Kansas in an exhibition game for four different charities for Hurricane Harvey and Hurricane Maria relief funds. This was the first time the teams had played since Missouri left the Big 12 for the SEC. The event raised $1.75 million for hurricane relief.

They finished the season 20–13, 10–8 in SEC play to finish in a three-way tie for fourth place. As the No. 5 seed in the SEC tournament, they lost in the second round to Georgia. They received an at-large bid to the NCAA tournament, where they lost in the first round to Florida State.

== Previous season ==
The Tigers finished the 2016–17 season 8–24, 2–16 in SEC play to finish in a tie for 13th place. As the No. 14 seed in the SEC tournament, they defeated Auburn in the first round before losing in the second round to Ole Miss.

On March 5, 2017, head coach Kim Anderson was asked to step down as head coach of the Tigers following the season. He was allowed to coach the team in the SEC tournament. On March 15, the school hired Cuonzo Martin as head coach.

== Offseason ==
Soon after his hiring at Missouri, Cuonzo Martin hired Michael Porter Sr. as an assistant coach. Shortly thereafter, after being released from his commitment to Washington following the firing of Washington head coach Lorenzo Romar, Porter's son, No. 2 overall recruit Michael Porter Jr., committed to Missouri to play for the 2017–18 season. Nearly two months later, his younger brother, Jontay Porter, joined the family to play in Missouri this season.

=== Departures ===
Name	Number	Pos.	Height	Weight	Year	Hometown	Notes
Willie Jackson	2	F	6'6"	212	Sophomore	Cleveland, OH	Transferred to Toledo
Frankie Hughes	3	G	6'4"	192	Sophomore	Cleveland, OH	Transferred to Duquesne
Jakoby Kemp	4	F	6'9"	215	Sophomore	Layton, UT	Transferred to Salt Lake CC
KJ Walton	11	G	6'3"	200	Junior	Indianapolis, IN	Transferred to Ball State
Trevor Glassman	13	G	6'3"	205	Senior	Bedford, NH	Graduated
Russell Woods	25	C	6'8"	236	Senior	Chicago, IL	Graduated

=== Incoming transfers ===
Name	Number	Pos.	Height	Weight	Year	Hometown	Previous Sshool
Kassius Robertson	5	G	6'3"	175	Senior	Toronto, ON	Transferred from Canisius. Was eligible to play immediately since Robertson graduated from Canisius.
Ronnie Suggs	2	G	6'5"	179	Junior	Washington, MO	Transferred from Bradley. Under NCAA transfer rules, Suggs had to sit out for the 2017–18 season. Had two years of remaining eligibility. Joined the team as a preferred walk-on.

=== 2017 recruiting class ===
College recruiting
Name	Hometown	School	Height	Weight	Commit date
Michael Porter Jr. #1 SF	Columbia, MO	Nathan Hale High School (WA)	6 ft 10 in (2.08 m)	212 lb (96 kg)	Mar 24, 2017
Michael Porter Jr. #1 SF	Recruit ratings: Scout: Rivals: 247Sports: (97)				
Jeremiah Tilmon #7 C	East St. Louis, IL	East St. Louis High School	6 ft 11 in (2.11 m)	230 lb (100 kg)	May 15, 2017
Jeremiah Tilmon #7 C	Recruit ratings: Scout: Rivals: 247Sports: (88)				
Blake Harris #29 CG	Chapel Hill, NC	Word of God Christian Academy	6 ft 3 in (1.91 m)	180 lb (82 kg)	Sep 4, 2017
Blake Harris #29 CG	Recruit ratings: Scout: Rivals: 247Sports: (83)				
C. J. Roberts #35 PG	North Richlands Hills, TX	Richland High School	6 ft 0 in (1.83 m)	180 lb (82 kg)	Sep 19, 2016
C. J. Roberts #35 PG	Recruit ratings: Scout: Rivals: 247Sports: (80)				
Jontay Porter #9 PF	Columbia, MO	Nathan Hale High School (WA)	6 ft 9 in (2.06 m)	230 lb (100 kg)	May 22, 2017
Jontay Porter #9 PF	Recruit ratings: Scout: Rivals: 247Sports: ESPN: (94)				
Overall recruit ranking: Scout: #7 Rivals: #7 247Sports: #8 ESPN: #7
Note: In many cases, Scout, Rivals, 247Sports, On3, and ESPN may conflict in their listings of height and weight.; In these cases, the average was taken. ESPN grades are on a 100-point scale.; Sources:

=== 2018 Recruiting class ===
College recruiting (2018)
Name	Hometown	School	Height	Weight	Commit date
Torrence Watson; SG	St. Louis, MO	Whitfield School	6 ft 5 in (1.96 m)	175 lb (79 kg)	Aug 9, 2017
Torrence Watson; SG	Recruit ratings: Scout: Rivals: 247Sports: ESPN: (84)				
Xavier Pinson; PG	Chicago, IL	Simeon Career Academy	6 ft 2 in (1.88 m)	170 lb (77 kg)	Feb 5, 2018
Xavier Pinson; PG	Recruit ratings: Scout: Rivals: 247Sports: ESPN: (N/A)				
Overall recruit ranking:
Note: In many cases, Scout, Rivals, 247Sports, On3, and ESPN may conflict in their listings of height and weight.; In these cases, the average was taken. ESPN grades are on a 100-point scale.; Sources:

== Roster ==
2017–18 Missouri Tigers men's basketball team
Players
Coaches

Pos.	#	Name	Height	Weight	Year	Previous school	Hometown
G	0	C. J. Roberts	6 ft 0 in (1.83 m)	180 lb (82 kg)	Fr	Richland High School	North Richland Hills, TX
G	1	Terrence Phillips (S)	5 ft 11 in (1.8 m)	185 lb (84 kg)	Jr	Oak Hill Academy	Orange County, CA
G	2	Ronnie Suggs (I, W) (redshirt)	6 ft 6 in (1.98 m)	190 lb (86 kg)	Jr	Washington High School; Bradley	Washington, MO
G	3	Kassius Robertson	6 ft 3 in (1.91 m)	180 lb (82 kg)	RS Sr	Thornlea Secondary School; Canisius	Toronto, ON
F	5	Mitchell Smith (redshirt)	6 ft 10 in (2.08 m)	215 lb (98 kg)	So	Van Buren High School	Van Buren, AR
G	10	Brett Rau (W)	6 ft 4 in (1.93 m)	175 lb (79 kg)	Sr	Burlington High School; Elgin CC	Burlington, IL
F	11	Jontay Porter	6 ft 11 in (2.11 m)	240 lb (109 kg)	Fr	Nathan Hale High School	Columbia, MO
F	13	Michael Porter Jr. (injured)	6 ft 10 in (2.08 m)	215 lb (98 kg)	Fr	Nathan Hale High School	Columbia, MO
C	14	Reed Nikko	6 ft 10 in (2.08 m)	250 lb (113 kg)	So	Maple Grove High School	Maple Grove, MN
G	15	Jordan Geist	6 ft 2 in (1.88 m)	180 lb (82 kg)	RS So	Homestead High School; Ranger College	Fort Wayne, IN
F	21	Jordan Barnett	6 ft 7 in (2.01 m)	215 lb (98 kg)	Sr	Christian Brothers College High School; Texas	St. Louis, MO
C	23	Jeremiah Tilmon	6 ft 11 in (2.11 m)	252 lb (114 kg)	Fr	East St. Louis High School	East St. Louis, IL
F	24	Kevin Puryear	6 ft 7 in (2.01 m)	238 lb (108 kg)	Jr	Blue Springs South High School	Blue Springs, MO
F	32	Adam Wolf (W)	6 ft 7 in (2.01 m)	219 lb (99 kg)	Jr	Beaver Dam High School	Beaver Dam, WI
G	33	Cullen VanLeer	6 ft 4 in (1.93 m)	208 lb (94 kg)	Jr	Pacific High School	Pacific, MO
G	55	Blake Harris	6 ft 3 in (1.91 m)	195 lb (88 kg)	Fr	Word of God Christian Academy	Chapel Hill, NC

Head coach

- Cuonzo Martin (Purdue)

Assistant coach(es)

- Chris Hollender (Evansville)
- Cornell Mann (Akron)
- Michael Porter Sr. (LSU New Orleans)

Legend

- (C) Team captain
- (S) Suspended
- (I) Ineligible
- (W) Walk-on
- Injured
- Current redshirt

Roster

== Schedule and results ==
Date time, TV	Rank^{#}	Opponent^{#}	Result	Record	High points	High rebounds	High assists	Site (attendance) city, state
Exhibition
October 22, 2017*; 3:00 pm, PPV		vs. Kansas; Showdown for Relief / Border War	L 87–93	–	21 – M. Porter	12 – M. Porter	5 – Phillips	Sprint Center (18,951); Kansas City, MO
Non-conference regular season
November 10, 2017*; 8:00 pm, SECN		Iowa State	W 74–59	1–0	17 – Puryear	8 – Puryear	4 – Geist	Mizzou Arena (15,061); Columbia, MO
November 13, 2017*; 8:00 pm, ESPN2		Wagner	W 99–55	2–0	23 – Robertson	8 – Nikko, J. Porter	5 – Phillips	Mizzou Arena (15,061); Columbia, MO
November 16, 2017*; 7:00 pm, P12N		at Utah	L 59–77	2–1	12 – Robertson	9 – Nikko	5 – Robertson	Jon M. Huntsman Center (12,064); Salt Lake City, UT
November 20, 2017*; 7:00 pm		Emporia State	W 67–62	3–1	13 – Tilmon, Puryear	11 – J. Porter	4 – Harris	Mizzou Arena (15,061); Columbia, MO
November 23, 2017*; 10:30 am, ESPN2		vs. Long Beach State; AdvoCare Invitational quarterfinals	W 95–58	4–1	16 – Geist	7 – Geist	9 – Harris	HP Field House (2,712); Lake Buena Vista, FL
November 24, 2017*; 10:00 am, ESPNews		vs. St. John's; AdvoCare Invitational semifinals	W 90–82	5–1	19 – Barnett	9 – Barnett, Geist	5 – Robertson, Phillips	HP Field House (2,367); Lake Buena Vista, FL
November 26, 2017*; 8:30 pm, ESPN2		vs. No. 23 West Virginia; AdvoCare Invitational championship game	L 79–83	5–2	21 – Barnett	11 – Barnett	4 – Robertson, Geist	HP Field House (2,591); Lake Buena Vista, FL
November 30, 2017*; 8:00 pm, ESPN2		at UCF; AutoCare Invitational non-bracket game	W 62–59	6–2	19 – Barnett, Robertson	7 – Tilmon	3 – Harris, Phillips, Robertson	CFE Arena (5,122); Orlando, FL
December 5, 2017*; 8:00 pm, SECN		Miami (OH)	W 70–51	7–2	20 – Puryear	8 – Barnett, J. Porter	4 – Geist	Mizzou Arena (15,061); Columbia, MO
December 9, 2017*; 8:00 pm, SECN		Green Bay	W 100–77	8–2	28 – Geist	11 – Tilmon	4 – Phillips, Porter	Mizzou Arena (15,061); Columbia, MO
December 16, 2017*; 7:30 pm, SECN		North Florida	W 85–51	9–2	18 – Barnett	11 – Barnett	7 – Harris	Mizzou Arena (15,061); Columbia, MO
December 19, 2017*; 8:00 pm, ESPNU		Stephen F. Austin	W 82–81	10–2	23 – Robertson	6 – Barnett	5 – Harris	Mizzou Arena (15,061); Columbia, MO
December 23, 2017*; 7:00 pm, ESPN2		vs. Illinois; Braggin' Rights game	L 64–70	10–3	22 – Robertson	10 – Barnett	2 – Harris, Phillips	Scottrade Center (21,289); St. Louis, MO
SEC regular season
January 3, 2018; 8:00 pm, ESPN2		at South Carolina	W 79–68	11–3 (1–0)	23 – Robertson	7 – J. Porter	6 – Geist	Colonial Life Arena (9,846); Columbia, SC
January 6, 2018; 12:00 pm, CBS		Florida	L 75–77	11–4 (1–1)	28 – Barnett	9 – Barnett	6 – J. Porter	Mizzou Arena (15,061); Columbia, MO
January 10, 2018; 8:00 pm, ESPN2		Georgia	W 68–56	12–4 (2–1)	15 – J. Porter, Robertson	10 – J. Porter	4 – Geist	Mizzou Arena (15,061); Columbia, MO
January 13, 2018; 5:00 pm, ESPN2		at Arkansas	L 63–65	12–5 (2–2)	26 – Robertson	10 – Barnett	3 – Barnett, Geist, Phillips	Bud Walton Arena (18,297); Fayetteville, AR
January 17, 2018; 8:00 pm, SECN		No. 21 Tennessee	W 59–55	13–5 (3–2)	12 – Puryear	10 – Puryear	3 – Geist	Mizzou Arena (15,061); Columbia, MO
January 20, 2018; 3:00 pm, ESPN2		at Texas A&M	L 49–60	13–6 (3–3)	9 – Barnett, Geist, Tilmon	7 – Robertson	3 – Geist, Robertson	Reed Arena (11,704); College Station, TX
January 24, 2018; 8:00 pm, SECN		No. 19 Auburn	L 73–91	13–7 (3–4)	21 – Robertson	8 – J. Porter	3 – Phillips	Mizzou Arena (15,061); Columbia, MO
January 27, 2018; 7:30 pm, SECN		at Mississippi State	L 62–74	13–8 (3–5)	20 – Robertson	7 – Geist	4 – Geist, Robertson	Humphrey Coliseum (7,169); Starkville, MS
January 31, 2018; 8:00 pm, ESPN2		at Alabama	W 69-60	14–8 (4–5)	22 – Robertson	9 – Geist	4 – Geist, Robertson	Coleman Coliseum (11,603); Tuscaloosa, AL
February 3, 2018; 1:00 pm, CBS		No. 21 Kentucky	W 69–60	15–8 (5–5)	16 – Barnett, Robertson	8 – J. Porter	4 – Robertson	Mizzou Arena (15,061); Columbia, MO
February 6, 2018; 8:00 pm, SECN		at Ole Miss	W 75–69	16–8 (6–5)	27 – Robertson	13 – J. Porter	6 – Geist	The Pavilion at Ole Miss (6,204); Oxford, MS
February 10, 2018; 1:00 pm, ESPN2		Mississippi State	W 89–85 ^{OT}	17–8 (7–5)	22 – Robertson	8 – Barnett	3 – Puryear, Robertson	Mizzou Arena (15,061); Columbia, MO
February 13, 2018; 6:00 pm, ESPNU		No. 21 Texas A&M	W 62–58	18–8 (8–5)	16 – Robertson	9 – J. Porter	5 – Geist	Mizzou Arena (15,061); Columbia, MO
February 17, 2018; 1:00 pm, ESPN2		at LSU	L 63–64	18–9 (8–6)	18 – Barnett	10 – Geist	3 – Robertson	Pete Maravich Assembly Center (9,635); Baton Rouge, LA
February 20, 2018; 8:00 pm, ESPN2		Ole Miss	L 87–90 ^{OT}	18–10 (8–7)	17 – Porter	12 – Tilmon	6 – Robertson	Mizzou Arena (15,061); Columbia, MO
February 24, 2018; 7:15 pm, ESPN		at Kentucky	L 66–88	18–11 (8–8)	26 – Robertson	8 – Robertson	3 – Robertson, Geist	Rupp Arena (23,038); Lexington, KY
February 27, 2018; 6:00 pm, ESPN2		at Vanderbilt	W 74–66	19–11 (9–8)	24 – J. Porter	7 – J. Porter	6 – J. Porter	Memorial Gymnasium (8,812); Nashville, TN
March 3, 2018; 5:00 pm, ESPN2		Arkansas	W 77–67	20–11 (10–8)	19 – Barnett, J. Porter	11 – Barnett	4 – J. Porter, Geist	Mizzou Arena (15,061); Columbia, MO
SEC Tournament
March 8, 2018; 2:45 pm, SECN	(5)	vs. (12) Georgia; Second Round	L 60–62	20–12	20 – J. Porter	8 – J. Porter, M. Porter	3 – Robertson	Scottrade Center (15,129); St. Louis, MO
NCAA tournament
March 16, 2018*; 8:45 pm, TBS	(8 W)	vs. (9 W) Florida State; First Round	L 54–67	20–13	19 – Robertson	10 – Porter Jr.	5 – J. Porter	Bridgestone Arena (17,549); Nashville, TN
*Non-conference game. ^{#}Rankings from AP Poll. (#) Tournament seedings in parentheses. W=West. All times are in Central Time.
