= 2017–18 Texas A&M Aggies men's basketball team =

American college basketball season

2017–18 Texas A&M Aggies men's basketball

Legends Classic champions

NCAA tournament, Sweet Sixteen
- Conference: Southeastern Conference

Ranking
- Coaches: No. 24
- Record: 22–13 (9–9 SEC)
- Head coach: Billy Kennedy (7th season)
- Assistant coaches: Amir Abdur-Rahim (4th season); Isaac Chew; Ulric Maligi (2nd season)
- Home arena: Reed Arena

2017–18 Southeastern Conference men's basketball standings
	Conf.				Overall
Team	W		L	PCT	W		L	PCT
No. 19 Auburn	13	–	5	.722	26	–	8	.765
No. 13 Tennessee	13	–	5	.722	26	–	9	.743
No. 23 Florida	11	–	7	.611	21	–	13	.618
No. 18 Kentucky †	10	–	8	.556	26	–	11	.703
Missouri	10	–	8	.556	20	–	13	.606
Arkansas	10	–	8	.556	23	–	12	.657
Mississippi State	9	–	9	.500	25	–	12	.676
Texas A&M	9	–	9	.500	22	–	13	.629
Alabama	8	–	10	.444	20	–	16	.556
LSU	8	–	10	.444	18	–	15	.545
Georgia	7	–	11	.389	18	–	15	.545
South Carolina	7	–	11	.389	17	–	16	.515
Vanderbilt	6	–	12	.333	12	–	20	.375
Ole Miss	5	–	13	.278	12	–	20	.375
† 2018 SEC tournament winner Rankings from AP poll

The 2017–18 Texas A&M Aggies men's basketball team represented Texas A&M University in the 2017–18 NCAA Division I men's basketball season. The team's head coach Billy Kennedy was in his seventh season at Texas A&M. The Aggies played their home games at Reed Arena in College Station, Texas in their sixth season as members of the Southeastern Conference. They finished the season 22–13, 9–9 in SEC play to finish in a tie for seventh place. They lost in the second round of the SEC tournament to Alabama. They received an at-large bid to the NCAA tournament where they defeated Providence and defending champion North Carolina to advance to the Sweet Sixteen where they lost to Michigan.

== Previous season ==
The Aggies finished the 2016–17 season 16–15, 8–10 in SEC play to finish in a tie for ninth place. They lost in the second round of the SEC tournament to Vanderbilt.

== Offseason ==
=== Departures ===
Name	Number	Pos.	Height	Weight	Year	Hometown	Reason for Departure
Kobie Eubanks	0	G	6'5"	206	Sophomore	Fort Lauderdale, FL	Transferred
Eric Vila	2	F	6'11"	206	Freshman	Girona, Spain	Transferred to Fresno State
J. C. Hampton	5	G	6'1"	192	RS Senior	Gainesville, GA	Graduated
Kyle Nugent	20	G	6'4"	180	Sophomore	College Station, TX	Walk-on; didn't return
Caleb Smith	23	G	6'0"	178	Freshman	Wichita, KS	Transferred to Ranger College
Chase Carlton	33	G	6'1"	186	Sophomore	Austin, TX	Walk-on; didn't return
Tavario Miller	42	F	6'7"	226	Senior	Long Island, Bahamas	Graduated

=== Incoming transfers ===
Name	Number	Pos.	Height	Weight	Year	Hometown	Previous college
Duane Wilson	13	G	6'2"	185	RS Senior	Milwaukee, WI	Transferred from Marquette. Will be eligible to play immediately since Wilson graduated from Marquette.
Josh Nebo	32	F/C	6'8"	215	Junior	Houston, TX	Transferred from Saint Francis (PA). Under NCAA transfer rules, Nebo will have to sit out in the 2017–18 season. Will have two years of eligibility left.

=== 2017 recruiting class ===
College recruiting information
Name	Hometown	School	Height	Weight	Commit date
TJ Starks; PG	Lancaster, TX	Lancaster High School	6 ft 2 in (1.88 m)	185 lb (84 kg)	Jun 30, 2016
TJ Starks; PG	Recruit ratings: Scout: Rivals: 247Sports: ESPN: (81)				
Isiah Jasey; PF	Wichita, KS	Sunrise Christian School	6 ft 9 in (2.06 m)	220 lb (100 kg)	Aug 8, 2016
Isiah Jasey; PF	Recruit ratings: Scout: Rivals: 247Sports: ESPN: (82)				
Savion Flagg; SF	Alvin, TX	Alvin High School	6 ft 6 in (1.98 m)	190 lb (86 kg)	Sep 14, 2016
Savion Flagg; SF	Recruit ratings: Scout: Rivals: 247Sports: ESPN: (84)				
Jay Jay Chandler; PG	Katy, TX	Cinco Ranch High School	6 ft 4 in (1.93 m)	171 lb (78 kg)	Nov 16, 2016
Jay Jay Chandler; PG	Recruit ratings: Scout: Rivals: 247Sports: ESPN: (81)				
John Walker; SF	Missouri City, TX	Fort Bend Marshall High School	6 ft 8 in (2.03 m)	190 lb (86 kg)	Jun 8, 2017
John Walker; SF	Recruit ratings: Scout: Rivals: 247Sports: ESPN: (N/A)				
Overall recruit ranking:
Note: In many cases, Scout, Rivals, 247Sports, On3, and ESPN may conflict in their listings of height and weight.; In these cases, the average was taken. ESPN grades are on a 100-point scale.; Sources: "Texas A&M 2017 Basketball Commitments". Rivals.; "2017 Texas A&M Basketball Commits". Scout.; "ESPN". ESPN.; "Scout.com Team Recruiting Rankings". Scout.; "2017 Team Ranking". Rivals.

=== 2018 recruiting class ===
College recruiting information
Name	Hometown	School	Height	Weight	Commit date
Antwann Jones; SG	Orlando, FL	Oak Ridge High School	6 ft 6 in (1.98 m)	210 lb (95 kg)	Nov 14, 2017
Antwann Jones; SG	Recruit ratings: Scout: Rivals: 247Sports: ESPN: (87)				
Overall recruit ranking:
Note: In many cases, Scout, Rivals, 247Sports, On3, and ESPN may conflict in their listings of height and weight.; In these cases, the average was taken. ESPN grades are on a 100-point scale.; Sources: "Texas A&M 2018 Basketball Commitments". Rivals.; "2018 Team Ranking". Rivals.

== Roster ==
2017–18 Texas A&M Aggies men's basketball team
Players
Coaches

Pos.	#	Name	Height	Weight	Year	Previous school	Hometown
G	0	Jay Jay Chandler	6 ft 4 in (1.93 m)	180 lb (82 kg)	Fr	Cinco Ranch	Katy, Texas
F	1	D. J. Hogg	6 ft 9 in (2.06 m)	215 lb (98 kg)	Jr	Plano West	Plano, Texas
G	2	TJ Starks	6 ft 2 in (1.88 m)	196 lb (89 kg)	Fr	Lancaster	Lancaster, Texas
G	3	Admon Gilder	6 ft 4 in (1.93 m)	199 lb (90 kg)	Jr	James Madison	Dallas, Texas
G	4	J. J. Caldwell	6 ft 1 in (1.85 m)	195 lb (88 kg)	RS Fr	SATCH Homeschool	Houston, Texas
G/F	5	Savion Flagg	6 ft 6 in (1.98 m)	217 lb (98 kg)	Fr	Alvin	Alvin, Texas
C	10	Tonny Trocha-Morelos	6 ft 10 in (2.08 m)	229 lb (104 kg)	RS Sr	Mayor Jose Celestino Mutis	Cartagena, Colombia
G	11	Mark French (W)	5 ft 8 in (1.73 m)	156 lb (71 kg)	So	Prestonwood Christian	Plano, Texas
G	12	Chris Collins (W)	6 ft 2 in (1.88 m)	181 lb (82 kg)	RS Jr	Friendswood	Friendswood, Texas
G	13	Duane Wilson	6 ft 2 in (1.88 m)	175 lb (79 kg)	RS Sr	Marquette	Milwaukee, Wisconsin
F	15	Isiah Jasey	6 ft 10 in (2.08 m)	248 lb (112 kg)	Fr	Sunrise Christian	Killeen, Texas
G	22	Frank Byers	5 ft 10 in (1.78 m)	180 lb (82 kg)	Jr	South Oak Cliff	Dallas, Texas
F	24	John Walker III	6 ft 9 in (2.06 m)	170 lb (77 kg)	Fr	Fort Bend Marshall	Missouri City, Texas
F	32	Josh Nebo (I) (redshirt)	6 ft 9 in (2.06 m)	242 lb (110 kg)	Jr	Saint Francis	Houston, Texas
C	34	Tyler Davis	6 ft 10 in (2.08 m)	266 lb (121 kg)	Jr	Plano West	Plano, Texas
F	44	Robert Williams III	6 ft 10 in (2.08 m)	241 lb (109 kg)	So	North Caddo	Vivian, Louisiana

Head coach

- Billy Kennedy (Southeastern Louisiana)

Assistant coach(es)

- Amir Abdur-Rahim (Murray State)
- Issac Chew (Avila)
- Ulric Maligi (Howard)

Legend

- (C) Team captain
- (S) Suspended
- (I) Ineligible
- (W) Walk-on
- Injured
- Current redshirt

Roster

== Schedule and results ==
Date time, TV	Rank^{#}	Opponent^{#}	Result	Record	High points	High rebounds	High assists	Site (attendance) city, state
Exhibition
Oct 25, 2017*; 7:00 pm		vs. Texas; Hurricane Harvey relief game	L 69–73	–	19 – Trocha-Morelos	15 – Williams	2 – 3 tied	Tudor Fieldhouse (2,048); Houston, TX
Nov 3, 2017*; 7:00 pm, SECN	No. 25	Tarleton State	W 72–46	–	21 – Starks	8 – Tied	5 – Wilson	Reed Arena (6,267); College Station, TX
Regular season
Nov 10, 2017*; 5:00 pm, ESPN	No. 25	vs. No. 11 West Virginia; State Farm Armed Forces Classic	W 88–65	1–0	23 – Tied	13 – Davis	7 – Gilder	Ramstein Air Base (3,128); Ramstein-Miesenbach, GER
Nov 17, 2017*; 7:00 pm	No. 16	UC Santa Barbara; Legends Classic campus-site game	W 84-65	2–0	24 – Hogg	6 – Tied	7 – Gilder	Reed Arena (7,275); College Station, TX
Nov 20, 2017*; 6:00 pm, ESPN2	No. 16	vs. Oklahoma State; Legends Classic semifinals	W 72–55	3–0	18 – Hogg	11 – Williams	5 – Wilson	Barclays Center (5,904); Brooklyn, NY
Nov 21, 2017*; 5:00 pm, ESPN2	No. 16	vs. Penn State; Legends Classic championship	W 98–87	4–0	22 – Wilson	9 – Williams	6 – Wilson	Barclays Center (5,081); Brooklyn, NY
Nov 24, 2017*; 7:00 pm, SECN	No. 16	Pepperdine; Legends Classic campus-site game	W 81–65	5–0	18 – Hogg	9 – Hogg	6 – Williams	Reed Arena (6,704); College Station, TX
Nov 26, 2017*; 9:00 pm, P12N	No. 16	at No. 10 USC	W 75–59	6–0	15 – Hogg	10 – Gilder	4 – Hogg	Galen Center (5,347); Los Angeles, CA
Nov 30, 2017*; 7:00 pm	No. 9	Texas–Rio Grande Valley	W 78–60	7–0	17 – Tied	14 – Williams	7 – Wilson	Reed Arena (7,121); College Station, TX
Dec 5, 2017*; 8:00 pm, ESPN2	No. 7	vs. Arizona; Valley of the Sun Shootout	L 64–67	7–1	23 – Davis	7 – Williams	5 – Wilson	Talking Stick Resort Arena (8,907); Phoenix, AZ
Dec 9, 2017*; 3:30 pm, SECN	No. 7	Prairie View A&M	W 73–53	8–1	14 – Gilder	16 – Williams	3 – Trocha-Morelos	Reed Arena (7,804); College Station, TX
Dec 13, 2017*; 7:00 pm	No. 9	Savannah State	W 113–66	9–1	18 – Hogg	17 – Davis	7 – Trocha-Morelos	Reed Arena (6,339); College Station, TX
Dec 19, 2017*; 7:00 pm, SECN+	No. 8	Northern Kentucky	W 64–58	10–1	16 – Wilson	10 – Tied	4 – Caldwell	Reed Arena (6,595); College Station, TX
Dec 21, 2017*; 8:00 pm, SECN	No. 8	Buffalo	W 89–73	11–1	23 – Wilson	11 – Davis	11 – Wilson	Reed Arena (6,654); College Station, TX
Dec 30, 2017; 5:00 pm, ESPN2	No. 5	at Alabama	L 57–79	11–2 (0–1)	14 – Tied	9 – Flagg	3 – Tied	Coleman Coliseum (14,218); Tuscaloosa, AL
Jan 2, 2018; 8:00 pm, ESPN2	No. 11	Florida	L 66–83	11–3 (0–2)	17 – Chandler	11 – Williams	7 – Caldwell	Reed Arena (12,524); College Station, TX
Jan 6, 2018; 1:15 pm, SECN	No. 11	LSU	L 68–69	11–4 (0–3)	19 – Davis	12 – Davis	6 – Caldwell	Reed Arena (10,845); College Station, TX
Jan 9, 2018; 6:00 pm, ESPN		at No. 21 Kentucky	L 73–74	11–5 (0–4)	19 – Davis	8 – Williams	6 – Caldwell	Rupp Arena (22,643); Lexington, KY
Jan 13, 2018; 5:00 pm, SECN		at No. 24 Tennessee	L 62–75	11–6 (0–5)	16 – Gilder	7 – 2 Tied	6 – Wilson	Thompson–Boling Arena (19,612); Knoxville, TN
Jan 16, 2018; 8:00 pm, SECN		Ole Miss	W 71–69	12–6 (1–5)	20 – Davis	12 – Davis	6 – Wilson	Reed Arena (10,578); College Station, TX
Jan 20, 2018; 3:00 pm, ESPN2		Missouri	W 60–49	13–6 (2–5)	14 – Trocha-Morelos	14 – Davis	2 – 6 tied	Reed Arena (11,704); College Station, TX
Jan 23, 2018; 8:00 pm, ESPNU		at LSU	L 65–77	13–7 (2–6)	21 – Williams	15 – Williams	2 – Tied	Maravich Center (8,528); Baton Rouge, LA
Jan 27, 2018*; 3:30 pm, ESPN		at No. 5 Kansas; Big 12/SEC Challenge	L 68–79	13–8	18 – Davis	9 – Tied	3 – 3 tied	Allen Fieldhouse (16,300); Lawrence, KS
Jan 30, 2018; 8:00 pm, ESPNU		Arkansas	W 80–66	14–8 (3–6)	16 – Starks	13 – Davis	5 – Starks	Reed Arena (8,761); College Station, TX
Feb 3, 2018; 1:00 pm, ESPN2		South Carolina	W 80–63	15–8 (4–6)	15 – Gilder	9 – Williams	6 – Wilson	Reed Arena (10,504); College Station, TX
Feb 7, 2018; 8:00 pm, ESPN2		at No. 8 Auburn	W 81–80	16–8 (5–6)	23 – Starks	8 – Davis	7 – Hogg	Auburn Arena (7,631); Auburn, AL
Feb 10, 2018; 7:15 pm, ESPN		No. 24 Kentucky	W 85–74	17–8 (6–6)	17 – Starks	11 – Williams	4 – Tied	Reed Arena (13,263); College Station, TX
Feb 13, 2018; 6:00 pm, ESPNU	No. 21	at Missouri	L 58–62	17–9 (6–7)	14 – Tied	9 – Williams	1 – 4 tied	Mizzou Arena (15,061); Columbia, MO
Feb 17, 2018; 3:00 pm, ESPN	No. 21	at Arkansas	L 75–94	17–10 (6–8)	20 – Tied	14 – Williams	4 – Davis	Bud Walton Arena (18,097); Fayetteville, AR
Feb 20, 2018; 6:00 pm, SECN		Mississippi State	L 81–93	17–11 (6–9)	25 – Davis	11 – Davis	6 – Hogg	Reed Arena (8,614); College Station, TX
Feb 24, 2018; 3:00 pm, ESPN2		at Vanderbilt	W 89–81	18–11 (7–9)	22 – Davis	9 – Davis	6 – Starks	Memorial Gymnasium (9,376); Nashville, TN
Feb 28, 2018; 7:30 pm, SECN		at Georgia	W 61–60	19–11 (8–9)	15 – Starks	7 – Starks	4 – Starks	Stegeman Coliseum (6,417); Athens, GA
Mar 3, 2018; 1:00 pm, ESPN2		Alabama	W 68–66	20–11 (9–9)	20 – Davis	10 – Davis	5 – Starks	Reed Arena (10,755); College Station, TX
SEC Tournament
Mar 8, 2018; 12:00 pm, SECN	(8)	vs. (9) Alabama; Second Round	L 70–71	20–12	23 – Starks	10 – Tied	4 – Starks	Scottrade Center (15,129); St. Louis, MO
NCAA Tournament
Mar 16, 2018*; 11:15 am, CBS	(7 W)	vs. (10 W) Providence; First Round	W 73–69	21–12	18 – Gilder	15 – Davis	8 – Starks	Spectrum Center (18,489); Charlotte, NC
Mar 18, 2018*; 5:15 pm, CBS	(7 W)	vs. (2 W) No. 10 North Carolina; Second Round	W 86–65	22–12	21 – Starks	13 – Williams	5 – Starks	Spectrum Center (18,485); Charlotte, NC
Mar 22, 2018*; 4:37 pm, TBS	(7 W)	vs. (3 W) No. 7 Michigan; Sweet Sixteen	L 72–99	22–13	24 – Davis	8 – Davis	5 – Hogg	Staples Center (19,181); Los Angeles, CA
*Non-conference game. ^{#}Rankings from AP Poll. (#) Tournament seedings in parentheses. W=West. All times are in Central Time.

== Ranking movement ==
Ranking movements Legend: ██ Increase in ranking ██ Decrease in ranking RV = Received votes
	Week																			
Poll	Pre	1	2	3	4	5	6	7	8	9	10	11	12	13	14	15	16	17	18	Final
AP	25	16	16	9	7	9	8	5	11	RV	RV	RV	RV	RV	21	RV	RV	RV	RV	Not released
Coaches	RV	RV^	19	10	9	10	9	6	13	RV	RV	RV	RV	RV	RV	RV	RV	RV	RV	24

^Coaches did not release a Week 2 poll.
*AP does not release post-NCAA Tournament rankings
