= 2017–18 South Carolina Gamecocks men's basketball team =

American college basketball season

2017–18 South Carolina Gamecocks men's basketball
- Conference: Southeastern Conference
- Record: 17–16 (7–11 SEC)
- Head coach: Frank Martin (6th season)
- Assistant coaches: Perry Clark; Bruce Shingler; Chuck Martin
- Home arena: Colonial Life Arena

2017–18 Southeastern Conference men's basketball standings
	Conf.				Overall
Team	W		L	PCT	W		L	PCT
No. 19 Auburn	13	–	5	.722	26	–	8	.765
No. 13 Tennessee	13	–	5	.722	26	–	9	.743
No. 23 Florida	11	–	7	.611	21	–	13	.618
No. 18 Kentucky †	10	–	8	.556	26	–	11	.703
Missouri	10	–	8	.556	20	–	13	.606
Arkansas	10	–	8	.556	23	–	12	.657
Mississippi State	9	–	9	.500	25	–	12	.676
Texas A&M	9	–	9	.500	22	–	13	.629
Alabama	8	–	10	.444	20	–	16	.556
LSU	8	–	10	.444	18	–	15	.545
Georgia	7	–	11	.389	18	–	15	.545
South Carolina	7	–	11	.389	17	–	16	.515
Vanderbilt	6	–	12	.333	12	–	20	.375
Ole Miss	5	–	13	.278	12	–	20	.375
† 2018 SEC tournament winner Rankings from AP poll

The 2017–18 South Carolina Gamecocks men's basketball team represented the University of South Carolina during the 2017–18 NCAA Division I men's basketball season. The team's head coach, Frank Martin, was in his sixth season at South Carolina. The team played its home games at Colonial Life Arena in Columbia, South Carolina as a member of the Southeastern Conference. They finished the season 17–16, 7–11 in SEC play to finish in a tie for 11th place. They defeated Ole Miss in the first round of the SEC tournament before losing in the second round to Arkansas.

== Previous season ==
The Gamecocks finished the 2016–17 season 26–11, 12–6 in SEC play to finish in a tie for third place. They lost in the quarterfinals of the SEC tournament to Alabama. They received an at-large bid to the NCAA tournament as a No. 7 seed in the East region. In the First Round, they defeated No. 10-seeded Marquette, the school's first NCAA Tournament win since 1974. They then defeated No. 2-seeded Duke to earn a trip to the Sweet Sixteen. In the Sweet Sixteen, they blew out No. 3 seed and No. 12-ranked Baylor by 20 points to earn a trip the Elite Eight. In the Elite Eight, they defeated fellow SEC-member No. 4-seeded Florida to advance to the first Final Four in school history. There the Gamecocks lost to the West Region's No. 1 seed, Gonzaga. The 26 wins marked the most wins in school history.

== Offseason ==
=== Departures ===
Name	Number	Pos.	Height	Weight	Year	Hometown	Notes
Sindarius Thornwell	0	G	6'5"	211	Senior	Lancaster, SC	Graduated/2017 NBA draft
Rakym Felder	4	G	5'10"	210	Freshman	Brooklyn, NY	Suspended from the team due to an assault
TeMarcus Blanton	5	G	6'5"	206	RS Sophomore	Locust Grove, GA	Retired from basketball due to a hip injury
Duane Notice	10	G	6'2"	225	Senior	Woodbridge, ON	Graduated
Ran Tut	14	F	6'9"	210	Junior	Melbourne, Australia	Graduate transferred to Angelo State
PJ Dozier	15	G	6'6"	205	Sophomore	Columbia, SC	Declare for 2017 NBA draft
Justin McKie	20	G	6'4"	204	Senior	Columbia, SC	Graduated
Sedee Keita	24	F	6'9"	240	Freshman	Philadelphia, PA	Transferred to St. John's
Jarrell Holliman	31	F	6'7"	206	RS Junior	Alpharretta, GA	Walk-on; left the team for personal reasons
John Ragin	34	G	6'2"	177	Sophomore	Eastover, SC	Walk-on; didn't return

=== Incoming transfers ===
Name	Number	Pos.	Height	Weight	Year	Hometown	Previous School
Frank Booker	5	G	6'4"	190	RS Senior	Augusta, GA	Transferred from Florida Atlantic. Will be eligible to play immediately since Booker graduated from Florida Atlantic.
Wesley Meyers	10	G	6'2"	186	RS Senior	Brooklyn, NY	Transferred from Maine. Will be eligible to play immediately since Meyers graduated from Maine.

=== 2017 recruiting class ===
College recruiting information
Name	Hometown	School	Height	Weight	Commit date
David Beatty #32 SG	Philadelphia, PA	Imhotep Institute Charter High School	6 ft 4 in (1.93 m)	200 lb (91 kg)	Nov 14, 2016
David Beatty #32 SG	Recruit ratings: Scout: Rivals: 247Sports: ESPN:				
Ibrahim Doumbia #32 PF	Miami, FL	Miami Country Day School	6 ft 8 in (2.03 m)	220 lb (100 kg)	Sep 28, 2016
Ibrahim Doumbia #32 PF	Recruit ratings: Scout: Rivals: 247Sports: ESPN:				
Felipe Haase #56 C	Los Angeles, CA	Cathedral High School	6 ft 8 in (2.03 m)	250 lb (110 kg)	Nov 10, 2016
Felipe Haase #56 C	Recruit ratings: Scout: Rivals: 247Sports: ESPN:				
Jason Cudd; C	Myrtle Beach, SC	Socastee High School	7 ft 0 in (2.13 m)	250 lb (110 kg)	Sep 12, 2016
Jason Cudd; C	Recruit ratings: Scout: Rivals: 247Sports: ESPN:				
Justin Minaya; SG	Old Tappan, NJ	Northern Valley Regional High School	6 ft 6 in (1.98 m)	190 lb (86 kg)	May 10, 2017
Justin Minaya; SG	Recruit ratings: Scout: Rivals: 247Sports: ESPN:				
Overall recruit ranking: Scout: 28 Rivals: 23 ESPN: 23
Note: In many cases, Scout, Rivals, 247Sports, On3, and ESPN may conflict in their listings of height and weight.; In these cases, the average was taken. ESPN grades are on a 100-point scale.; Sources: "South Carolina 2017 Basketball Commitments". Rivals.; "2017 South Carolina Basketball Commits". Scout.; "ESPN". ESPN.; "Scout.com Team Recruiting Rankings". Scout.; "2017 Team Ranking". Rivals.

=== 2018 recruiting class ===
College recruiting information (2018)
Name	Hometown	School	Height	Weight	Commit date
Jermaine Couisnard; SG	East Chicago, IN	Montverde Academy	6 ft 4 in (1.93 m)	185 lb (84 kg)	Jan 27, 2018
Jermaine Couisnard; SG	Recruit ratings: Scout: Rivals: 247Sports: ESPN:				
Alanzo Frink; PF	Roselle, NJ	Roselle Catholic High School	6 ft 8 in (2.03 m)	215 lb (98 kg)	Apr 3, 2018
Alanzo Frink; PF	Recruit ratings: Scout: Rivals: 247Sports: ESPN:				
Overall recruit ranking:
Note: In many cases, Scout, Rivals, 247Sports, On3, and ESPN may conflict in their listings of height and weight.; In these cases, the average was taken. ESPN grades are on a 100-point scale.; Sources: "South Carolina 2018 Basketball Commitments". Rivals.; "2018 Team Ranking". Rivals.

== Roster ==
2017–18 South Carolina Gamecocks men's basketball team
Players
Coaches

Pos.	#	Name	Height	Weight	Year	Previous school	Hometown
G	0	David Beatty	6 ft 2 in (1.88 m)	205 lb (93 kg)	Fr	Imhotep Institute Charter HS	Philadelphia, PA
G	1	Kory Holden	6 ft 1 in (1.85 m)	197 lb (89 kg)	RS Jr	J.B. Bennett; Delaware	Salisbury, MD
G	2	Hassani Gravett	6 ft 1 in (1.85 m)	187 lb (85 kg)	RS Jr	Alexander; Pensacola State College	Villa Rica, GA
G	5	Frank Booker Jr.	6 ft 3 in (1.91 m)	208 lb (94 kg)	RS Sr	Westside HS; Florida Atlantic	Augusta, GA
G	10	Justin Minaya	6 ft 5 in (1.96 m)	210 lb (95 kg)	Fr	Northern Valley Regional HS	Old Tappan, NJ
F	12	Khadim Gueye	7 ft 0 in (2.13 m)	248 lb (112 kg)	So	Victory Rock Prep	Dakar, Senegal
F	13	Felipe Haase	6 ft 9 in (2.06 m)	249 lb (113 kg)	Fr	Miami Christian School	Osorno, Chile
F	14	Ibrahim Doumbia	6 ft 6 in (1.98 m)	205 lb (93 kg)	Fr	Miami Country Day School	Miami, FL
G	15	Wesley Myers	6 ft 1 in (1.85 m)	193 lb (88 kg)	RS Sr	Boys and Girls HS; Maine	Brooklyn, NY
G	20	Tommy Corchiani (W)	6 ft 3 in (1.91 m)	180 lb (82 kg)	So	Ravenscroft	Raleigh, NC
F	21	Maik Kotsar	6 ft 10 in (2.08 m)	245 lb (111 kg)	So	Sunrise Christian Academy	Tallinn, Estonia
G	23	Evan Hinson	6 ft 4 in (1.93 m)	240 lb (109 kg)	So	Deltona HS	Deltona, FL
G	25	Christian Schmitt (W)	5 ft 11 in (1.8 m)	180 lb (82 kg)	So	Mars Area HS	Mars, PA
F	30	Chris Silva	6 ft 9 in (2.06 m)	223 lb (101 kg)	Jr	Roselle Catholic HS	Libreville, Gabon
F	33	Jason Cudd	7 ft 1 in (2.16 m)	255 lb (116 kg)	Fr	Socastee HS	Myrtle Beach, SC

Head coach

- Frank Martin (FIU)

Assistant coach(es)

- Perry Clark (Gettysburg)
- Bruce Shingler (St. Augustine's)
- Chuck Martin (Monmouth)

Legend

- (C) Team captain
- (S) Suspended
- (I) Ineligible
- (W) Walk-on
- Injured
- Current redshirt

Roster

== Schedule and results ==
Date time, TV	Rank^{#}	Opponent^{#}	Result	Record	High points	High rebounds	High assists	Site (attendance) city, state
Exhibition
Oct 30, 2017*; 7:00 pm		Erskine	W 85–44		15 – Silva	12 – Haase	3 – Gravett/Haase	Colonial Life Arena; Columbia, SC
Nov 5, 2017*; 2:00 pm, SECN+		Virginia Tech; Hoops 4 Hurricane Relief	L 67–86		15 – Gravett	7 – Haase	3 – Gravett/Haase	Colonial Life Arena; Columbia, SC
Regular season
Nov 10, 2017*; 7:00 pm, ESPN3		at Wofford	W 72–53	1–0	13 – Kotsar	10 – Silva	4 – Kotsar	Jerry Richardson Indoor Stadium (3,400); Spartanburg, SC
Nov 13, 2017*; 8:00 pm, SECN		Western Michigan; Puerto Rico Tip-Off non-bracket game	W 78–60	2–0	15 – Gravett	10 – Silva	3 – Haase	Colonial Life Arena (12,136); Columbia, SC
Nov 16, 2017*; 11:30 am, ESPN2		vs. Illinois State; Puerto Rico Tip-Off quarterfinals	L 65–69	2–1	10 – Booker/Gravett/Silva	9 – Gravett	5 – Gravett	HTC Center (700); Conway, SC
Nov 17, 2017*; 10:30 am, ESPNU		vs. UTEP; Puerto Rico Tip-Off consolation round	W 80–56	3–1	15 – Silva	7 – Silva	9 – Gravett	HTC Center (987); Conway, SC
Nov 19, 2017*; 2:00 pm, ESPNU		vs. Western Michigan; Puerto Rico Tip-Off 5th place game	W 79–66	4–1	14 – Myers	5 – Myers	6 – Gravett	HTC Center (1,774); Conway, SC
Nov 27, 2017*; 7:00 pm, CBSSN		at FIU	W 78–61	5–1	26 – Silva	10 – Gravett/Silva	7 – Gravett	FIU Arena (1,335); Miami, FL
Nov 30, 2017*; 9:00 pm, ESPNU		vs. Temple; Under Armour Reunion	L 60–76	5–2	14 – Beatty	9 – Silva	2 – Beatty/Kotsar/Myers	Madison Square Garden (6,081); New York, NY
Dec 2, 2017*; 2:00 pm, SECN+		Massachusetts	W 76–70	6–2	17 – Minaya	10 – Haase	4 – Gravett	Colonial Life Arena (10,832); Columbia, SC
Dec 6, 2017*; 7:00 pm, SECN+		Wyoming	W 80–64	7–2	19 – Silva	10 – Silva	3 – Haase/Myers	Colonial Life Arena (10,205); Columbia, SC
Dec 9, 2017*; 12:00 pm, SECN		Coastal Carolina	W 80–78	8–2	19 – Booker	9 – Silva	4 – Gravett	Colonial Life Arena (11,734); Columbia, SC
Dec 19, 2017*; 7:00 pm, ESPNU		at Clemson; Rivalry	L 48–64	8–3	12 – Silva	9 – Silva	1 – Gravett/Minaya	Littlejohn Coliseum (8,031); Clemson, SC
Dec 27, 2017*; 3:00 pm, SECN+		Limestone	W 74–45	9–3	17 – Booker	8 – Haase	6 – Myers	Colonial Life Arena (11,305); Columbia, SC
Dec 31, 2017; 6:00 pm, ESPN2		at Ole Miss	L 69–74	9–4 (0–1)	21 – Booker/Silva	13 – Silva	5 – Myers	The Pavilion at Ole Miss (5,849); Oxford, MS
Jan 3, 2018; 9:00 pm, ESPN2		Missouri	L 68–79	9–5 (0–2)	18 – Silva	5 – Booker/Silva	2 – Kotsar/Minaya/Myers	Colonial Life Arena (9,846); Columbia, SC
Jan 6, 2018; 6:45 pm, SECN		Vanderbilt	W 71–60	10–5 (1–2)	27 – Silva	8 – Silva	2 – Haase	Colonial Life Arena (11,391); Columbia, SC
Jan 9, 2018; 7:00 pm, SECN		at Alabama	L 62–76	10–6 (1–3)	15 – Myers	5 – Kotsar/Minaya	2 – Minaya/Myers	Coleman Coliseum (10,909); Tuscaloosa, AL
Jan 13, 2018; 1:00 pm, SECN		at Georgia	W 64–57	11–6 (2–3)	17 – Booker	9 – Silva	4 – Silva	Stegeman Coliseum (10,523); Athens, GA
Jan 16, 2018; 9:00 pm, ESPN		No. 18 Kentucky	W 76–68	12–6 (3–3)	27 – Silva	8 – Silva	5 – Gravett	Colonial Life Arena (16,200); Columbia, SC
Jan 20, 2018; 6:00 pm, ESPN2		No. 21 Tennessee	L 63–70	12–7 (3–4)	16 – Minaya	5 – Silva/Kotsar/Minaya	5 – Kotsar	Colonial Life Arena (18,000); Columbia, SC
Jan 24, 2018; 7:00 pm, SECN		at No. 20 Florida	W 77–72	13–7 (4–4)	Myers – 22	12 – Silva	4 – Kotsar/Myers	O'Connell Center (10,151); Gainesville, FL
Jan 27, 2018*; 12:00 pm, ESPN2		No. 14 Texas Tech; Big 12/SEC Challenge	L 63–70	13–8	16 – Silva	7 – Kotsar	4 – Myers	Colonial Life Arena (14,142); Columbia, SC
Jan 31, 2018; 8:30 pm, SECN		Mississippi State	L 76–81	13–9 (4–5)	23 – Booker	6 – Silva/Beatty	7 – Gravett	Colonial Life Arena (11,042); Columbia, SC
Feb 3, 2018; 2:00 pm, ESPN2		at Texas A&M	L 60–83	13–10 (4–6)	16 – Minaya	8 – Silva	4 – Gravett	Reed Arena (10,504); College Station, TX
Feb 6, 2018; 7:00 pm, ESPN2		at Arkansas	L 65–81	13–11 (4–7)	12 – Gravett	7 – Gravett	4 – Gravett/Minaya	Bud Walton Arena (14,956); Fayetteville, AR
Feb 10, 2018; 12:00 pm, CBS		Florida	L 41–65	13–12 (4–8)	17 – Booker	5 – Silva/Kotsar	2 – Gravett/Minaya	Colonial Life Arena (14,629); Columbia, SC
Feb 13, 2018; 9:00 pm, ESPNU		at No. 18 Tennessee	L 67–70	13–13 (4–9)	19 – Booker	9 – Silva	4 – Gravett	Thompson–Boling Arena (13,126); Knoxville, TN
Feb 17, 2018; 3:30 pm, SECN		No. 10 Auburn	W 84–75	14–13 (5–9)	19 – Booker	11 – Silva	3 – Gravett/Booker	Colonial Life Arena (14,995); Columbia, SC
Feb 21, 2018; 6:30 pm, SECN		Georgia	W 66–57	15–13 (6–9)	15 – Silva/Myers	9 – Kotsar	5 – Gravett	Colonial Life Arena (11,529); Columbia, SC
Feb 24, 2018; 3:30 pm, SECN		at Mississippi State	L 68–72	15–14 (6–10)	19 – Gravett	12 – Silva	3 – Gravett	Humphrey Coliseum (8,612); Starkville, MS
Feb 28, 2018; 6:30 pm, SECN		LSU	W 83–74	16–14 (7–10)	25 – Booker	7 – Myers	4 – Myers/Gravett	Colonial Life Arena (11,269); Columbia, SC
Mar 3, 2018; 3:30 pm, SECN		at No. 14 Auburn	L 70–79	16–15 (7–11)	27 – Booker	11 – Silva	4 – Booker/Haase	Auburn Arena (9,121); Auburn, AL
SEC tournament
Mar 7, 2018; 9:30 pm, SECN	(11)	vs. (14) Ole Miss; First round	W 85–84	17–15	21 – Silva/Booker	11 – Silva	7 – Gravett	Scottrade Center (8,190); St. Louis, MO
Mar 8, 2018; 9:30 pm, SECN	(11)	vs. (6) Arkansas; Second round	L 64–69	17–16	15 – Silva/Kotsar	11 – Silva	3 – Beatty	Scottrade Center (11,752); St. Louis, MO
*Non-conference game. ^{#}Rankings from AP Poll. (#) Tournament seedings in parentheses. All times are in Eastern Time.

== See also ==
- 2017–18 South Carolina Gamecocks women's basketball team
