= 2017–18 Tennessee Volunteers basketball team =

American college basketball season

2017–18 Tennessee Volunteers basketball

SEC regular season co-champions

NCAA tournament, Second Round
- Conference: Southeastern Conference

Ranking
- Coaches: No. 16
- AP: No. 13
- Record: 26–9 (13–5 SEC)
- Head coach: Rick Barnes (3rd season)
- Assistant coaches: Rob Lanier; Desmond Oliver; Michael Schwartz
- Home arena: Thompson–Boling Arena

2017–18 Southeastern Conference men's basketball standings
	Conf.				Overall
Team	W		L	PCT	W		L	PCT
No. 19 Auburn	13	–	5	.722	26	–	8	.765
No. 13 Tennessee	13	–	5	.722	26	–	9	.743
No. 23 Florida	11	–	7	.611	21	–	13	.618
No. 18 Kentucky †	10	–	8	.556	26	–	11	.703
Missouri	10	–	8	.556	20	–	13	.606
Arkansas	10	–	8	.556	23	–	12	.657
Mississippi State	9	–	9	.500	25	–	12	.676
Texas A&M	9	–	9	.500	22	–	13	.629
Alabama	8	–	10	.444	20	–	16	.556
LSU	8	–	10	.444	18	–	15	.545
Georgia	7	–	11	.389	18	–	15	.545
South Carolina	7	–	11	.389	17	–	16	.515
Vanderbilt	6	–	12	.333	12	–	20	.375
Ole Miss	5	–	13	.278	12	–	20	.375
† 2018 SEC tournament winner Rankings from AP poll

The 2017–18 Tennessee Volunteers basketball team represented the University of Tennessee in the 2017–18 NCAA Division I men's basketball season. The Volunteers were led by third-year head coach Rick Barnes. The team played its home games at Thompson–Boling Arena in Knoxville, Tennessee, as a member of the Southeastern Conference. They finished the season 26–9, 13–5 in SEC play to earn a share of the SEC regular season championship. As the No. 2 seed in the SEC tournament, they defeated Mississippi State and Arkansas before losing to Kentucky in the championship game. They received an at-large bid to the NCAA tournament as the No. 3 seed in the South region. There the Volunteers defeated Wright State before being upset by Loyola–Chicago in the Second Round.

== Previous season ==
The Vols finished the 2016–17 season 16–16, 8–10 in SEC play to finish in a tie for ninth place. They lost in the second round of the SEC tournament to Georgia.

== Offseason ==
=== Departures ===
Name	Number	Pos.	Height	Weight	Year	Hometown	Notes	Ref
Robert Hubbs III	3	G	6'5"	207	Senior	Newbern, TN	Graduated	
Kwe Parker	12	G	6'0"	181	Freshman	Fayetteville, NC	Transferred to Cape Fear Community College	
Lew Evans	21	F	6'7"	235	RS Senior	Salt Lake City, UT	Graduated	
Shembari Phillips	25	G	6'3"	192	Sophomore	Atlanta, GA	Transferred to Georgia Tech	

=== Incoming transfers ===
Name	Number	Pos.	Height	Weight	Year	Hometown	Notes	Ref
James Daniel III	3	G	6'0"	175	RS Senior	Hampton, VA	Graduate transfer from Howard. Eligible to play immediately.	
Chris Darrington	32	G	6'1"	179	Junior	Toledo, OH	Junior college transfer from Vincennes University. Eligible to play immediately.	

=== 2017 recruiting class ===
College recruiting information
Name	Hometown	School	Height	Weight	Commit date
Yves Pons; SF	Paris, France	INSEP Paris	6 ft 6 in (1.98 m)	217 lb (98 kg)	Feb 28, 2017
Yves Pons; SF	Recruit ratings: Scout: Rivals: 247Sports:				
Derrick Walker; PF	Kansas City, MO	Sunrise Christian Academy	6 ft 8 in (2.03 m)	255 lb (116 kg)	Feb 2, 2017
Derrick Walker; PF	Recruit ratings: Scout: Rivals: 247Sports: ESPN: (80)				
Zach Kent; C	Middletown, DE	Blair Academy	6 ft 10 in (2.08 m)	235 lb (107 kg)	Oct 30, 2016
Zach Kent; C	Recruit ratings: Scout: Rivals: 247Sports: ESPN: (77)				
Overall recruit ranking: Scout: NR Rivals: NR 247Sports: NR ESPN: NR
Note: In many cases, Scout, Rivals, 247Sports, On3, and ESPN may conflict in their listings of height and weight.; In these cases, the average was taken. ESPN grades are on a 100-point scale.; Sources: "Rivals.com 2017 Tennessee Basketball Commitments". Rivals.; "2017 Team Ranking". Rivals.

== Roster ==
2017–18 Tennessee Volunteers men's basketball team
Players
Coaches

Pos.	#	Name	Height	Weight	Year	Previous school	Hometown
G	0	Jordan Bone	6 ft 3 in (1.91 m)	176 lb (80 kg)	So	The Ensworth School	Nashville, Tennessee
G	1	Lamonte Turner	6 ft 1 in (1.85 m)	183 lb (83 kg)	RS So	IMG Academy	Florence, Alabama
F	2	Grant Williams	6 ft 7 in (2.01 m)	241 lb (109 kg)	So	Providence Day School	Charlotte, North Carolina
G	3	James Daniel III	6 ft 0 in (1.83 m)	172 lb (78 kg)	RS Sr	Howard	Hampton, Virginia
G	4	Jacob Fleschman (W)	6 ft 3 in (1.91 m)	168 lb (76 kg)	So	Westlake High School	Austin, Texas
F	5	Admiral Schofield	6 ft 5 in (1.96 m)	238 lb (108 kg)	Jr	Zion-Benton Township High School	Zion, Illinois
F	10	John Fulkerson	6 ft 9 in (2.06 m)	210 lb (95 kg)	RS Fr	Christ School	Kingsport, Tennessee
F	11	Kyle Alexander	6 ft 11 in (2.11 m)	220 lb (100 kg)	Jr	Orangeville Prep	Milton, Ontario, Canada
G	12	Brad Woodson (W)	6 ft 1 in (1.85 m)	180 lb (82 kg)	Jr	Riverdale High School	Murfreesboro, Tennessee
G	13	Jalen Johnson	6 ft 7 in (2.01 m)	190 lb (86 kg)	RS Fr	Wesleyan Christian Academy	Durham, North Carolina
F	15	Derrick Walker	6 ft 8 in (2.03 m)	238 lb (108 kg)	Fr	Sunrise Christian Academy	Kansas City, Missouri
G	23	Jordan Bowden	6 ft 5 in (1.96 m)	185 lb (84 kg)	So	Carter High School	Knoxville, Tennessee
G	24	Lucas Campbell (W)	6 ft 4 in (1.93 m)	186 lb (84 kg)	Jr	Christian Academy of Knoxville	Knoxville, Tennessee
G	32	Chris Darrington	6 ft 1 in (1.85 m)	179 lb (81 kg)	Jr	Vincennes University	Toledo, Ohio
F	33	Zach Kent	6 ft 10 in (2.08 m)	224 lb (102 kg)	Fr	Blair Academy	Magnolia, Delaware
F	35	Yves Pons	6 ft 5 in (1.96 m)	203 lb (92 kg)	Fr	INSEP Academy	Fuveau, France

Head coach

- Rick Barnes (Lenoir–Rhyne)

Assistant coach(es)

- Rob Lanier (St. Bonaventure)
- Desmond Oliver (Dominican (NY))
- Michael Schwartz (Texas)

Legend

- (C) Team captain
- (S) Suspended
- (I) Ineligible
- (W) Walk-on
- Injured
- Current redshirt

Roster

=== Depth chart ===
Pos.	Starting 5	Bench 1	Bench 2	Bench 3
F/C	Kyle Alexander	John Fulkerson	Zach Kent
F	Grant Williams	Derrick Walker
G/F	Admiral Schofield	Yves Pons	Jalen Johnson	Lucas Campbell (W)
G	Jordan Bowden	Lamonte' Turner	Chris Darrington	Jacob Fleschman (W)
PG	Jordan Bone	James Daniel		Brad Woodson (W)

== Schedule and results ==
Date time, TV	Rank^{#}	Opponent^{#}	Result	Record	High points	High rebounds	High assists	Site (attendance) city, state
Exhibition
November 2, 2017*; 7:00 pm		Carson–Newman	W 86–44	–	18 – Williams	12 – Williams	8 – Bone	Thompson–Boling Arena (5,014); Knoxville, TN
November 5, 2017*; 12:30 pm		at Clemson; Exhibition for Hurricane Relief	W 71–67	–	24 – Williams	7 – Tied	4 – Daniel	Littlejohn Coliseum (4,112); Clemson, SC
Regular season
November 10, 2017*; 7:00 pm		Presbyterian; Battle 4 Atlantis campus-site game	W 88–53	1–0	22 – Schofield	7 – Williams	5 – Fulkerson	Thompson–Boling Arena (15,047); Knoxville, TN
November 14, 2017*; 7:00 pm		High Point	W 84–53	2–0	16 – Bone	12 – Williams	10 – Daniel	Thompson–Boling Arena (12,343); Knoxville, TN
November 22, 2017*; 12:00 pm, ESPN2		vs. No. 18 Purdue; Battle 4 Atlantis quarterfinals	W 78–75 ^{OT}	3–0	22 – Williams	11 – Alexander	3 – Bone	Imperial Arena (1,306); Nassau, Bahamas
November 23, 2017*; 12:30 pm, ESPN		vs. No. 5 Villanova; Battle 4 Atlantis semifinals	L 76–85	3–1	20 – Williams	8 – Williams	5 – Turner	Imperial Arena (2,102); Nassau, Bahamas
November 24, 2017*; 2:30 pm, ESPN2		vs. NC State; Battle 4 Atlantis 3rd Place game	W 67–58	4–1	14 – Williams	13 – Alexander	4 – Williams	Imperial Arena (1,329); Nassau, Bahamas
November 29, 2017*; 7:00 pm		Mercer	W 84–60	5–1	21 – Williams	4 – Tied	10 – Daniel	Thompson–Boling Arena (13,642); Knoxville, TN
December 3, 2017*; 6:00 pm, ESPNU		at Georgia Tech	W 77–70	6–1	24 – Turner	11 – Alexander	4 – Bone	McCamish Pavilion (6,529); Atlanta, GA
December 9, 2017*; 2:15 pm, SECN	No. 24	Lipscomb	W 81–71	7–1	19 – Williams	8 – Williams	6 – Bone	Thompson–Boling Arena (14,051); Knoxville, TN
December 17, 2017*; 3:00 pm, ESPN	No. 20	No. 7 North Carolina	L 73–78	7–2	15 – Williams	9 – Turner	4 – Bone	Thompson–Boling Arena (21,678); Knoxville, TN
December 20, 2017*; 9:00 pm, SECN	No. 21-T	Furman	W 66–61	8–2	21 – Bowden	13 – Schofield	4 – Daniel	Thompson–Boling Arena (13,095); Knoxville, TN
December 23, 2017*; 12:30 pm, ESPN2	No. 21-T	at Wake Forest	W 79–60	9–2	17 – Bowden	6 – Schofield	5 – Bone	LJVM Coliseum (11,362); Winston-Salem, NC
December 30, 2017; 1:00 pm, SECN	No. 19	at Arkansas	L 93–95 ^{OT}	9–3 (0–1)	21 – Bone	7 – Schofield	5 – Bone	Bud Walton Arena (18,696); Fayetteville, AR
January 2, 2018; 7:00 pm, ESPNU	No. 23	Auburn	L 84–94	9–4 (0–2)	25 – Turner	8 – Williams	3 – Bowden	Thompson–Boling Arena (14,755); Knoxville, TN
January 6, 2018; 9:00 pm, SECN	No. 23	No. 17 Kentucky; Rivalry	W 76–65	10–4 (1–2)	20 – Schofield	9 – Schofield	6 – Daniel	Thompson–Boling Arena (21,678); Knoxville, TN
January 9, 2018; 9:00 pm, SECN	No. 24	at Vanderbilt	W 92–84	11–4 (2–2)	37 – Williams	9 – Schofield	4 – Daniel	Memorial Gymnasium (11,510); Nashville, TN
January 13, 2018; 6:00 pm, SECN	No. 24	Texas A&M	W 75–62	12–4 (3–2)	15 – Bowden	8 – Schofield	4 – Bone	Thompson–Boling Arena (19,612); Knoxville, TN
January 17, 2018; 9:00 pm, SECN	No. 21	at Missouri	L 55–59	12–5 (3–3)	15 – Williams	5 – Tied	3 – Tied	Mizzou Arena (15,061); Columbia, MO
January 20, 2018; 6:00 pm, ESPN2	No. 21	at South Carolina	W 70–63	13–5 (4–3)	25 – Turner	6 – Turner	3 – Tied	Colonial Life Arena (18,000); Columbia, SC
January 23, 2018; 7:00 pm, ESPNU	No. 22	Vanderbilt	W 67–62	14–5 (5–3)	19 – Bowden	6 – Tied	4 – Daniel	Thompson–Boling Arena (14,127); Knoxville, TN
January 27, 2018*; 4:00 pm, ESPNU	No. 22	at Iowa State; Big 12/SEC Challenge	W 68–45	15–5	20 – Turner	10 – Tied	3 – Tied	Hilton Coliseum (14,384); Ames, IA
January 31, 2018; 6:00 pm, SECN	No. 18	LSU	W 84–61	16–5 (6–3)	17 – Daniel	8 – Schofield	8 – Bone	Thompson–Boling Arena (13,425); Knoxville, TN
February 3, 2018; 6:00 pm, SECN	No. 18	Ole Miss	W 94–61	17–5 (7–3)	17 – Tied	12 – Schofield	6 – Bone	Thompson–Boling Arena (18,316); Knoxville, TN
February 6, 2018; 7:00 pm, ESPN	No. 15	at No. 24 Kentucky; Rivalry	W 61–59	18–5 (8–3)	16 – Turner	8 – Bowden	4 – Bone	Rupp Arena (23,332); Lexington, KY
February 10, 2018; 6:00 pm, SECN	No. 15	at Alabama	L 50–78	18–6 (8–4)	16 – Williams	7 – Tied	2 – Bone	Coleman Coliseum (15,383); Tuscaloosa, AL
February 13, 2018; 9:00 pm, ESPNU	No. 18	South Carolina	W 70–67	19–6 (9–4)	22 – Williams	5 – Tied	4 – Bone	Thompson–Boling Arena (13,126); Knoxville, TN
February 17, 2018; 6:00 pm, SECN	No. 18	at Georgia	L 62–73	19–7 (9–5)	14 – Turner	13 – Alexander	7 – Bone	Stegeman Coliseum (10,028); Athens, GA
February 21, 2018; 9:00 pm, ESPN2	No. 19	Florida	W 62–57	20–7 (10–5)	23 – Williams	8 – Schofield	4 – Tied	Thompson–Boling Arena (16,016); Knoxville, TN
February 24, 2018; 1:00 pm, SECN	No. 19	at Ole Miss	W 73–65	21–7 (11–5)	25 – Schofield	7 – Tied	8 – Bone	The Pavilion at Ole Miss (8,149); Oxford, MS
February 27, 2018; 7:00 pm, SECN	No. 16	at Mississippi State	W 76–54	22–7 (12–5)	24 – Schofield	7 – Tied	4 – Tied	Humphrey Coliseum (7,548); Starkville, MS
March 3, 2018; 6:00 pm, SECN	No. 16	Georgia	W 66–61	23–7 (13–5)	23 – Schofield	9 – Alexander	7 – Bowden	Thompson–Boling Arena (21,678); Knoxville, TN
SEC Tournament
March 9, 2018; 7:00 pm, SECN	(2) No. 13	vs. (7) Mississippi State; Quarterfinals	W 62–59	24–7	15 – Turner	11 – Williams	3 – Tied	Scottrade Center (14,596); St. Louis, MO
March 10, 2018; 3:30 pm, ESPN	(2) No. 13	vs. (6) Arkansas; Semifinals	W 84–66	25–7	19 – Bone	7 – Tied	4 – Tied	Scottrade Center (18,729); St. Louis, MO
March 11, 2018; 1:00 pm, ESPN	(2) No. 13	vs. (4) Kentucky; Championship	L 72–77	25–8	22 – Schofield	10 – Schofield	4 – Tied	Scottrade Center (18,973); St. Louis, MO
NCAA tournament
March 15, 2018*; 12:40 pm, truTV	(3 S) No. 13	vs. (14 S) Wright State; First Round	W 73–47	26–8	19 – Turner	12 – Schofield	9 – Turner	American Airlines Center (15,802); Dallas, TX
March 17, 2018*; 6:10 pm, TNT	(3 S) No. 13	vs. (11 S) Loyola–Chicago; Second Round	L 62–63	26–9	14 – Schofield	5 – Turner	5 – Bone	American Airlines Center (18,642); Dallas, TX
*Non-conference game. ^{#}Rankings from AP Poll. (#) Tournament seedings in parentheses. S=South. All times are in Eastern Time.

== Rankings ==
Ranking movements Legend: ██ Increase in ranking ██ Decrease in ranking — = Not ranked RV = Received votes т = Tied with team above or below
	Week																			
Poll	Pre	1	2	3	4	5	6	7	8	9	10	11	12	13	14	15	16	17	18	Final
AP	—	—	—	RV	24	20	21-T	19	23	24	21	22	18	15	18	19	16	13	13	Not released
Coaches	—	—^	—	RV	RV	20	20	20	22	23	21	21	19	14	17	19	17	12	12	16

^Coaches' Poll did not release a second poll at the same time as the AP.
*AP does not release post-NCAA Tournament rankings

== See also ==
- 2017–18 Tennessee Lady Volunteers basketball team
