= 2018 SEC men's basketball tournament =

- Classification: Division I
- Season: 2017–18
- Teams: 14
- Site: Scottrade Center; St. Louis, Missouri
- Champions: Kentucky (32nd title)
- Winning coach: John Calipari (6th title)
- MVP: Shai Gilgeous-Alexander (Kentucky)
- Attendance: 103,733
- Television: SEC Network, ESPN

2017–18 Southeastern Conference men's basketball standings
	Conf.				Overall
Team	W		L	PCT	W		L	PCT
No. 19 Auburn	13	–	5	.722	26	–	8	.765
No. 13 Tennessee	13	–	5	.722	26	–	9	.743
No. 23 Florida	11	–	7	.611	21	–	13	.618
No. 18 Kentucky †	10	–	8	.556	26	–	11	.703
Missouri	10	–	8	.556	20	–	13	.606
Arkansas	10	–	8	.556	23	–	12	.657
Mississippi State	9	–	9	.500	25	–	12	.676
Texas A&M	9	–	9	.500	22	–	13	.629
Alabama	8	–	10	.444	20	–	16	.556
LSU	8	–	10	.444	18	–	15	.545
Georgia	7	–	11	.389	18	–	15	.545
South Carolina	7	–	11	.389	17	–	16	.515
Vanderbilt	6	–	12	.333	12	–	20	.375
Ole Miss	5	–	13	.278	12	–	20	.375
† 2018 SEC tournament winner Rankings from AP poll

The 2018 Southeastern Conference men's basketball tournament was a postseason men's basketball tournament for the Southeastern Conference held at Scottrade Center, now known as Enterprise Center, in St. Louis, Missouri, from March 7 through March 11, 2018. Kentucky defeated Tennessee, 77–72, in the championship game to earn an automatic bid to the 2018 NCAA Division I men's basketball tournament.

== Seeds ==
Seed	School	Conference record	Overall record	Tiebreaker
1	Auburn^{‡†}	13–5	25–6	1–0 vs. Tennessee
2	Tennessee^{‡†}	13–5	23–7	0–1 vs. Auburn
3	Florida^{†}	11–7	20–11	
4	Kentucky^{†}	10–8	21–10	2–1 vs. Arkansas and Missouri
5	Missouri^{#}	10–8	20–11	2–2 vs. Arkansas and Kentucky
6	Arkansas^{#}	10–8	21–10	1–2 vs. Kentucky and Missouri
7	Mississippi State^{#}	9–9	21–10	1–0 vs. Texas A&M
8	Texas A&M^{#}	9–9	20–11	0–1 vs. Mississippi State
9	Alabama^{#}	8–10	17–14	2–0 vs. LSU
10	LSU^{#}	8–10	17–13	0–2 vs. Alabama
11	South Carolina	7–11	16–15	2–0 vs. Georgia
12	Georgia	7–11	16–14	0–2 vs. South Carolina
13	Vanderbilt	6–12	12–19	
14	Ole Miss	5–13	12–19	
‡ – SEC regular season co-champions, and tournament No. 1 and No. 2 seeds. † – Received a double-bye in the conference tournament. # – Received a single-bye in the conference tournament. Overall records include all games played in the SEC Tournament.

== Schedule ==
Game	Time*	Matchup^{#}	Score	Television	Attendance
First round – Wednesday, March 7
1	6:00 pm	No. 12 Georgia vs. No. 13 Vanderbilt	78–62	SEC Network	8,190
2	8:30 pm	No. 11 South Carolina vs. No. 14 Ole Miss	85–84	SEC Network	8,190
Second round – Thursday, March 8
3	Noon	No. 8 Texas A&M vs. No. 9 Alabama	70–71	SEC Network	15,129
4	2:30 pm	No. 5 Missouri vs. No. 12 Georgia	60–62	SEC Network	15,129
5	6:00 pm	No. 7 Mississippi State vs. No. 10 LSU	80–77	SEC Network	11,752
6	8:30 pm	No. 6 Arkansas vs. No. 11 South Carolina	69–64	SEC Network	11,752
Quarterfinals – Friday, March 9
7	Noon	No. 1 Auburn vs. No. 9 Alabama	63–81	ESPN	16,364
8	2:30 pm	No. 4 Kentucky vs. No. 12 Georgia	62–49	ESPN	16,364
9	6:00 pm	No. 2 Tennessee vs. No. 7 Mississippi State	62–59	SEC Network	14,596
10	8:30 pm	No. 3 Florida vs. No. 6 Arkansas	72–80	SEC Network	14,596
Semifinals – Saturday, March 10
11	Noon	No. 4 Kentucky vs. No. 9 Alabama	86–63	ESPN	18,729
12	2:30 pm	No. 2 Tennessee vs No. 6 Arkansas	84–66	ESPN	18,729
Championship – Sunday, March 11
13	Noon	No. 4 Kentucky vs No. 2 Tennessee	77–72	ESPN	18,973
*Game times in CT. # – Rankings denote tournament seed

== Bracket ==
First round Wednesday, March 7 SECN
12	Georgia	78
13	Vanderbilt	62
11	South Carolina	85
14	Ole Miss	84

Second round Thursday, March 8 SECN
8	Texas A&M	70
9	Alabama	71
5	Missouri	60
12	Georgia	62
7	Mississippi State	80
10	LSU	77
6	Arkansas	69
11	South Carolina	64

Quarterfinals; Friday, March 9 ESPN/SECN
1	Auburn	63
9	Alabama	81
4	Kentucky	62
12	Georgia	49
2	Tennessee	62
7	Mississippi State	59
3	Florida	72
6	Arkansas	80

Semifinals; Saturday, March 10; ESPN
9	Alabama	63
4	Kentucky	86
2	Tennessee	84
6	Arkansas	66

Championship; Sunday, March 11; ESPN
4	Kentucky	77
2	Tennessee	72

== Game summaries ==
=== First round ===
SECN

March 7
6:00 pm

Recap

No. 13 Vanderbilt 62, No. 12 Georgia 78
Scoring by half: 22–43, 40–35
Pts: R. LaChance 17; Rebs: S. Lee 7 Asts: Tied 3	Pts: Y. Maten 25; Rebs: D. Ogbeide 10; Asts: T. Hightower 6

Scottrade Center
St. Louis, MO
Attendance: 8,190
Referees: Joe Lindsay, Brian Shey, Chuck Jones

SECN

March 7
8:18 pm

Recap

No. 14 Ole Miss 84, No. 11 South Carolina 85
Scoring by half: 36–48, 38–47
Pts: B. Tyree 18; Rebs: B. Stevens 13; Asts: D. Burnett 4	Pts: 2 Tied 21; Rebs: C. Silva 11; Asts: H. Gravett 7

Scottrade Center
St. Louis, MO
Attendance: 8,190
Referees: Tony Greene, Tony Henderson, Todd Austin

=== Second round ===
SECN

March 8
12:00 pm

Recap

No. 9 Alabama 71, No. 8 Texas A&M 70
Scoring by half: 35–36, 36-34
Pts: C. Sexton 27; Rebs: D. Ingram 9 Asts: C. Sexton 5	Pts: T. Starks 23; Rebs: T. Davis 10; Asts: T. Starks 4

Scottrade Center
St. Louis, MO
Attendance: 15,129
Referees: Doug Shows, Chuck Jones, Tony Henderson

SECN

March 8
2:30 pm

No. 12 Georgia 62, No. 5 Missouri 60
Scoring by half: 33–24, 29–36
Pts: Y. Maten 21; Rebs: Y. Maten 10; Asts: T. Crump 3	Pts: J. Porter 20; Rebs: J. Porter 8 Asts: K. Robertson 3

Scottrade Center
St. Louis, MO
Attendance: 15,129
Referees: Pat Adams, Bart Lenox, Todd Austin

SECN

March 8
6:00 pm

No. 10 LSU 77, No. 7 Mississippi State 80
Scoring by half: 29–45, 48–35
Pts: T. Waters 28; Rebs: B. Rachal 9 Asts: T. Waters 6	Pts: L. Peters 24; Rebs: A. Holman 12; Asts: L. Peters 6

Scottrade Center
St. Louis, MO
Attendance: 11,752
Referees: Tony Greene, Jason Baker, Wil Howard

SECN

March 8
8:00 pm

No. 11 South Carolina 64, No. 6 Arkansas 69
Scoring by half: 28–36, 36–33
Pts: C. Silva 15; Rebs: C. Silva 11; Asts: W. Myers 4	Pts: J. Barford 17; Rebs: D. Macon 4 Asts: A. Beard 5

Scottrade Center
St. Louis, MO
Attendance: 11,752
Referees: Anthony Jordan, Brian Shey, Vladimir Voyard-Tadal

=== Quarterfinals ===
ESPN

March 9
12:00 pm

No. 9 Alabama 81, No. 1 Auburn 63
Scoring by half: 31–41, 50–22
Pts: C. Sexton 31; Rebs: B. Key 10; Asts: D. Ingram 5	Pts: M. Heron 18; Rebs: D. Murray 8 Asts: J. Harper 4

Scottrade Center
St. Louis, MO
Attendance: 16,364
Referees: Anthony Jordan, Todd Austin, Bart Lenox

ESPN

March 9
2:30 pm

No. 12 Georgia 49, No. 4 Kentucky 62
Scoring by half: 23–30, 26-32
Pts: T. Crump 17; Rebs: D. Ogbeide 11; Asts: Tied 1	Pts: P. Washington 18; Rebs: P. Washington 7 Asts: S. Gilgeous-Alexander 9

Scottrade Center
St. Louis, MO
Attendance: 16,364
Referees: Tony Greene, Joe Lindsay, Wil Howard

SECN

March 9
6:00 pm

No. 7 Mississippi State 59, No. 2 Tennessee 62
Scoring by half: 24–31, 35–31
Pts: L. Peters 22; Rebs: A. Ado 8 Asts: Q. Weatherspoon 1	Pts: L. Turner 15; Rebs: G. Williams 11; Asts: Tied 3

Scottrade Center
St. Louis, MO
Attendance: 14,596
Referees: Brian Shey, Pat Adams, Rob Rorke

SECN

March 9
8:30 pm

No. 6 Arkansas 80, No. 3 Florida 72
Scoring by half: 30–29, 50–43
Pts: J. Barford 27; Rebs: D. Gafford 12; Asts: Tied 3	Pts: K. Stone 22; Rebs: E. Koulechov 6 Asts: C. Chiozza 6

Scottrade Center
St. Louis, MO
Attendance: 14,596
Referees: Doug Shows, Chuck Jones, Tony Henderson

=== Semifinals ===
ESPN

March 10
12:00 pm

No. 9 Alabama 63, No. 4 Kentucky 86
Scoring by half: 19–29, 44–57
Pts: C. Sexton 21; Rebs: D. Giddens 7 Asts: C. Sexton 3	Pts: W. Gabriel 23; Rebs: P. Washington 8 Asts: S. Gilgeous-Alexander 8

Scottrade Center
St. Louis, MO
Attendance: 18,729
Referees: Doug Shows, Tony Greene, Todd Austin

ESPN

March 10
2:00 pm

No. 6 Arkansas 66, No. 2 Tennessee 84
Scoring by half: 29–48, 37–36
Pts: D. Macon 19; Rebs: D. Hall 7 Asts: D. Hall	Pts: J. Bone 19; Rebs: Tied 7 Asts: Tied 4

Scottrade Center
St. Louis, MO
Attendance: 18,729
Referees: Anthony Jordan, Chuck Jones, Joe Lindsay

=== Championship ===
ESPN

March 11
12:00 pm

No. 4 Kentucky 77, No. 2 Tennessee 72
Scoring by half: 36–31, 41–41
Pts: S. Gilgeous-Alexander 29; Rebs: Tied 7 Asts: Tied 3	Pts: A. Schofield 22; Rebs: A. Schofield 10; Asts: Tied 4

Scottrade Center
St. Louis, MO
Attendance: 18,973
Referees: Joe Lindsay, Doug Shows, Anthony Jordan
