= 2017–18 Arkansas Razorbacks men's basketball team =

American college basketball season

2017–18 Arkansas Razorbacks men's basketball

NCAA tournament, First Round
- Conference: Southeastern Conference
- Record: 23–12 (10–8 SEC)
- Head coach: Mike Anderson (7th season)
- Associate head coach: Melvin Watkins
- Assistant coaches: T. J. Cleveland; Scotty Thurman
- Home arena: Bud Walton Arena

2017–18 Southeastern Conference men's basketball standings
	Conf.				Overall
Team	W		L	PCT	W		L	PCT
No. 19 Auburn	13	–	5	.722	26	–	8	.765
No. 13 Tennessee	13	–	5	.722	26	–	9	.743
No. 23 Florida	11	–	7	.611	21	–	13	.618
No. 18 Kentucky †	10	–	8	.556	26	–	11	.703
Missouri	10	–	8	.556	20	–	13	.606
Arkansas	10	–	8	.556	23	–	12	.657
Mississippi State	9	–	9	.500	25	–	12	.676
Texas A&M	9	–	9	.500	22	–	13	.629
Alabama	8	–	10	.444	20	–	16	.556
LSU	8	–	10	.444	18	–	15	.545
Georgia	7	–	11	.389	18	–	15	.545
South Carolina	7	–	11	.389	17	–	16	.515
Vanderbilt	6	–	12	.333	12	–	20	.375
Ole Miss	5	–	13	.278	12	–	20	.375
† 2018 SEC tournament winner Rankings from AP poll

The 2017–18 Arkansas Razorbacks men's basketball team represented the University of Arkansas in the 2017–18 NCAA Division I men's basketball season. The team was led by Mike Anderson, who was in his seventh season. The Razorbacks played their home games at Bud Walton Arena in Fayetteville, Arkansas as a member of the Southeastern Conference. They finished the season 23–12, 10–8 in SEC play to finish in a three-way tie for fourth place. As the No. 6 seed in the SEC tournament, they defeated South Carolina and Florida before losing in the semifinals to Tennessee. They received an at-large bid to the NCAA tournament, where they lost in the first round to Butler.

Senior guard Jaylen Barford was named first-team All-SEC, while senior guard Daryl Macon was a second-team All-SEC selection. Freshman center Daniel Gafford was named to the SEC All-Freshman Team. On March 26, 2018, Gafford announced he would forgo the 2018 NBA draft and would be returning to Arkansas for his sophomore season.

== Previous season ==
The Razorbacks finished the 2016–17 season 26–10, 12–6 in SEC play to finish in a tie for third. In the SEC tournament, they defeated Ole Miss and Vanderbilt before losing to Kentucky in the tournament championship. They received an at-large bid to the NCAA tournament for the second time in three years as a #8 seed in the South region. There, they defeated #9 Seton Hall before falling to top seed and eventual national champion North Carolina in the round of 32.

== Offseason ==
=== Departures ===
Name	Number	Pos.	Height	Weight	Year	Hometown	Reason for departure
Dusty Hannahs	3	G	6'3"	210	Senior	Little Rock, Arkansas	Graduated
Brachen Hazen	12	F	6'8"	195	Freshman	Fort Wayne, Indiana	Transferred
Manuale Watkins	21	G	6'3"	220	Senior	Fayetteville, Arkansas	Graduated
Moses Kingsley	33	C	6'10"	230	Senior	Abuja, Nigeria	Graduated

=== 2017 recruiting class ===
College recruiting
Name	Hometown	School	Height	Weight	Commit date
Daniel Gafford; F	El Dorado, Arkansas	El Dorado High School	6 ft 11 in (2.11 m)	220 lb (100 kg)	Aug 1, 2015
Daniel Gafford; F	Recruit ratings: Scout: Rivals: 247Sports: ESPN:				
Khalil Garland; G	Little Rock, Arkansas	Parkview High School	6 ft 5 in (1.96 m)	195 lb (88 kg)	Jul 16, 2016
Khalil Garland; G	Recruit ratings: Scout: Rivals: 247Sports: ESPN:				
Darious Hall; F	Little Rock, Arkansas	Mills University Studies High School	6 ft 6 in (1.98 m)	215 lb (98 kg)	Mar 15, 2016
Darious Hall; F	Recruit ratings: Scout: Rivals: 247Sports: ESPN:				
Gabe Osabuohien; F	Toronto, Ontario, Canada	Southwest Christian Academy	6 ft 8 in (2.03 m)	219 lb (99 kg)	May 24, 2017
Gabe Osabuohien; F	Recruit ratings: 247Sports:				
Overall recruit ranking:
Note: In many cases, Scout, Rivals, 247Sports, On3, and ESPN may conflict in their listings of height and weight.; In these cases, the average was taken. ESPN grades are on a 100-point scale.; Sources: "ESPN". ESPN.; "2017 Team Ranking". Rivals.

=== 2018 recruiting class ===
College recruiting (2018)
Name	Hometown	School	Height	Weight	Commit date
Isaiah Joe; SG	Fort Smith, AR	Northside High School	6 ft 4 in (1.93 m)	180 lb (82 kg)	Aug 2, 2016
Isaiah Joe; SG	Recruit ratings: Scout: Rivals: 247Sports: ESPN:				
Desi Sills; PG	Jonesboro, AR	Jonesboro High School	6 ft 2 in (1.88 m)	180 lb (82 kg)	Aug 19, 2016
Desi Sills; PG	Recruit ratings: Scout: Rivals: 247Sports: ESPN:				
Ethan Henderson; PF	Little Rock, AR	Parkview Magnet High School	6 ft 9 in (2.06 m)	200 lb (91 kg)	Sep 5, 2016
Ethan Henderson; PF	Recruit ratings: Scout: Rivals: 247Sports: ESPN:				
Keyshawn Embery; PG	Oklahoma City, OK	Midwest City High School	6 ft 4 in (1.93 m)	175 lb (79 kg)	Sep 16, 2017
Keyshawn Embery; PG	Recruit ratings: Scout: Rivals: 247Sports: ESPN:				
Jordan Phillips; SF	Cedar Hill, TX	Cedar Hill High School	6 ft 6 in (1.98 m)	190 lb (86 kg)	Oct 8, 2017
Jordan Phillips; SF	Recruit ratings: Scout: Rivals: 247Sports: ESPN:				
Reggie Chaney; PF	Frisco, TX	Findlay Prep	6 ft 8 in (2.03 m)	230 lb (100 kg)	Oct 28, 2017
Reggie Chaney; PF	Recruit ratings: Scout: Rivals: 247Sports: ESPN:				
Mason Jones; SG	Warner, OK	Connors State College	6 ft 5 in (1.96 m)	175 lb (79 kg)	Apr 7, 2018
Mason Jones; SG	Recruit ratings: Scout: Rivals: 247Sports: ESPN:				
Overall recruit ranking:
Note: In many cases, Scout, Rivals, 247Sports, On3, and ESPN may conflict in their listings of height and weight.; In these cases, the average was taken. ESPN grades are on a 100-point scale.; Sources: "2018 Arkansas Commits". Rivals.; "2018 Team Ranking". Rivals.

== Roster ==
2017–18 Arkansas Razorbacks men's basketball team
Players
Coaches

Pos.	#	Name	Height	Weight	Year	Previous school	Hometown
G	0	Jaylen Barford	6 ft 3 in (1.91 m)	205 lb (93 kg)	Sr	South Side HS; Motlow State CC	Jackson, Tennessee
PF	1	Trey Thompson	6 ft 9 in (2.06 m)	265 lb (120 kg)	Sr	Forrest City HS	Madison, Arkansas
SF	2	Adrio Bailey	6 ft 7 in (2.01 m)	215 lb (98 kg)	So	Lakeview HS	Campti, Louisiana
SG	3	Khalil Garland	6 ft 5 in (1.96 m)	195 lb (88 kg)	Fr	Parkview Arts and Science Magnet High School	Little Rock, Arkansas
SG	4	Daryl Macon	6 ft 3 in (1.91 m)	185 lb (84 kg)	Sr	Parkview HS; Holmes CC	Little Rock, Arkansas
SF	5	Arlando Cook	6 ft 8 in (2.03 m)	215 lb (98 kg)	Sr	Madison Prep; Connors State College	St. Louis, Missouri
PF	10	Daniel Gafford	6 ft 11 in (2.11 m)	235 lb (107 kg)	Fr	El Dorado High School	El Dorado, Arkansas
SG	11	Jalen Harris	6 ft 2 in (1.88 m)	170 lb (77 kg)	RS So	Word of God Christian Academy; New Mexico	Raleigh, North Carolina
SG	15	Jonathan Holmes	5 ft 10 in (1.78 m)	190 lb (86 kg)	So	Columbia High School	Columbia, Illinois
SF	20	Darious Hall	6 ft 6 in (1.98 m)	210 lb (95 kg)	Fr	Mills University Studies High School	Little Rock, Arkansas
SF	22	Gabe Osabuohien	6 ft 8 in (2.03 m)	220 lb (100 kg)	Fr	Southwest Christian Academy	Toronto
SG	23	C.J. Jones	6 ft 5 in (1.96 m)	180 lb (82 kg)	So	Central Park Christian HS	Birmingham, Alabama
PG	31	Anton Beard	6 ft 0 in (1.83 m)	190 lb (86 kg)	Sr	North Little Rock HS	North Little Rock, Arkansas

Head coach

- Mike Anderson (Tulsa)

Assistant coach(es)

- Melvin Watkins (Charlotte)
- T. J. Cleveland (Arkansas)
- Scotty Thurman (Arkansas)

Legend

- (C) Team captain
- (S) Suspended
- (I) Ineligible
- (W) Walk-on
- Injured
- Current redshirt

Roster
Last update: 2018-03-06

== Schedule and results ==
Date time, TV	Rank^{#}	Opponent^{#}	Result	Record	Site (attendance) city, state
Exhibition
Oct 27, 2017*; 7:00 p.m.		Central Oklahoma	W 78–66		Bud Walton Arena (13,272); Fayetteville, AR
Nov 3, 2017*; 7:00 p.m.		Missouri Western	W 88–74		Bud Walton Arena (13,291); Fayetteville, AR
Regular season
Nov 10, 2017*; 7:00 p.m.		Samford	W 95–56	1–0	Bud Walton Arena (13,407); Fayetteville, AR
Nov 12, 2017*; 5:00 p.m., SECN		Bucknell	W 101–73	2–0	Bud Walton Arena (13,404); Fayetteville, AR
Nov 17, 2017*; 7:00 p.m., ESPN3		Fresno State	W 83–75	3–0	Bud Walton Arena (15,051); Fayetteville, AR
Nov 23, 2017*; 4:00 p.m., ESPN2		vs. Oklahoma; PK80 tournament Victory Bracket quarterfinals	W 92–83	4–0	Moda Center (11,294); Portland, OR
Nov 24, 2017*; 2:30 p.m., ESPN		vs. No. 9 North Carolina; PK80 Tournament Victory Bracket semifinals	L 68–87	4–1	Veterans Memorial Coliseum (6,603); Portland, OR
Nov 26, 2017*; 2:00 p.m., ESPN		vs. UConn; PK80 Tournament Victory Bracket 3rd place game	W 102–67	5–1	Moda Center (11,571); Portland, OR
Dec 2, 2017*; 6:30 p.m., CBSSN		at Houston	L 65–91	5–2	H&PE Arena (4,186); Houston, TX
Dec 5, 2017*; 7:00 p.m.		Colorado State	W 92–66	6–2	Bud Walton Arena (13,634); Fayetteville, AR
Dec 9, 2017*; 5:45 p.m., SECN		No. 14 Minnesota	W 95–79	7–2	Bud Walton Arena (17,583); Fayetteville, AR
Dec 16, 2017*; 7:00 p.m.		vs. Troy; North Little Rock Showcase	W 88–63	8–2	Verizon Arena (16,416); North Little Rock, AR
Dec 19, 2017*; 7:00 p.m., ESPN3		Oral Roberts	W 104–69	9–2	Bud Walton Arena (13,945); Fayetteville, AR
Dec 27, 2017*; 7:00 p.m., SECN		Cal State Bakersfield	W 95–68	10–2	Bud Walton Arena (15,829); Fayetteville, AR
Dec 30, 2017; 12:00 p.m., SECN		No. 19 Tennessee	W 95–93 ^{OT}	11–2 (1–0)	Bud Walton Arena (18,696); Fayetteville, AR
Jan 2, 2018; 8:00 p.m., SECN	No. 22	at Mississippi State	L 75–78	11–3 (1–1)	Humphrey Coliseum (6,324); Starkville, MS
Jan 6, 2018; 5:00 p.m., ESPNU	No. 22	at Auburn	L 77–88	11–4 (1–2)	Auburn Arena (8,950); Auburn, AL
Jan 10, 2018; 8:00 p.m., SECN		LSU	L 54–75	11–5 (1–3)	Bud Walton Arena (15,199); Fayetteville, AR
Jan 13, 2018; 5:00 p.m., ESPN2		Missouri	W 65–63	12–5 (2–3)	Bud Walton Arena (18,297); Fayetteville, AR
Jan 17, 2018; 6:00 p.m., ESPN2		at Florida	L 73–88	12–6 (2–4)	O'Connell Center (9,929); Gainesville, FL
Jan 20, 2018; 2:30 p.m., SECN		Ole Miss	W 97–93	13–6 (3–4)	Bud Walton Arena (18,030); Fayetteville, AR
Jan 23, 2018; 5:30 p.m., SECN		at Georgia	W 80–77 ^{2OT}	14–6 (4–4)	Stegeman Coliseum (6,405); Athens, GA
Jan 27, 2018*; 5:00 p.m., ESPN2		Oklahoma State; Big 12/SEC Challenge	W 66–65	15–6	Bud Walton Arena (18,057); Fayetteville, Arkansas
Jan 30, 2018; 8:00 p.m., ESPNU		at Texas A&M	L 66–80	15–7 (4–5)	Reed Arena (8,761); College Station, TX
Feb 3, 2018; 2:30 p.m., SECN		at LSU	L 86–94	15–8 (4–6)	Pete Maravich Assembly Center (9,272); Baton Rouge, LA
Feb 6, 2018; 6:00 p.m., ESPN2		South Carolina	W 81–65	16–8 (5–6)	Bud Walton Arena (14,956); Fayetteville, AR
Feb 10, 2018; 7:30 p.m., SECN		Vanderbilt	W 72–54	17–8 (6–6)	Bud Walton Arena (17,083); Fayetteville, AR
Feb 13, 2018; 6:00 p.m., SECN		at Ole Miss	W 75–64	18–8 (7–6)	The Pavilion at Ole Miss (6,023); Oxford, MS
Feb 17, 2018; 3:00 p.m., ESPN		No. 21 Texas A&M	W 94–75	19–8 (8–6)	Bud Walton Arena (18,097); Fayetteville, AR
Feb 20, 2018; 8:00 p.m., ESPN		Kentucky	L 72–87	19–9 (8–7)	Bud Walton Arena (18,083); Fayetteville, AR
Feb 24, 2018; 5:00 p.m., SECN		at Alabama	W 76–73	20–9 (9–7)	Coleman Coliseum (15,383); Tuscaloosa, AL
Feb 27, 2018; 8:00 p.m., SECN		No. 14 Auburn	W 91–82	21–9 (10–7)	Bud Walton Arena (15,733); Fayetteville, AR
Mar 3, 2018; 5:00 p.m., ESPN2		at Missouri	L 67–77	21–10 (10–8)	Mizzou Arena (15,061); Columbia, MO
SEC Tournament
Mar 8, 2018; 8:00 p.m., SECN	(6)	vs. (11) South Carolina; Second Round	W 69–64	22–10	Scottrade Center (11,752); St. Louis, MO
Mar 9, 2018; 8:00 p.m., SECN	(6)	vs. (3) Florida; Quarterfinals	W 80–72	23–10	Scottrade Center (14,596); St. Louis, MO
Mar 10, 2018; 2:30 p.m., ESPN	(6)	vs. (2) No. 13 Tennessee; Semifinals	L 66–84	23–11	Scottrade Center (18,729); St. Louis, MO
NCAA tournament
Mar 16, 2018*; 2:10 p.m., truTV	(7 E)	vs. (10 E) Butler; First Round	L 62–79	23–12	Little Caesars Arena (20,163); Detroit, MI
*Non-conference game. ^{#}Rankings from AP Poll. (#) Tournament seedings in parentheses. E=East. All times are in Central Time.
