= 2017–18 LSU Tigers basketball team =

American college basketball season

2017–18 LSU Tigers basketball

NIT, Second Round
- Conference: Southeastern Conference
- Record: 18–15 (8–10 SEC)
- Head coach: Will Wade (1st season)
- Assistant coaches: Bill Armstrong; Tony Benford; Greg Heiar
- Home arena: Pete Maravich Assembly Center

2017–18 Southeastern Conference men's basketball standings
	Conf.				Overall
Team	W		L	PCT	W		L	PCT
No. 19 Auburn	13	–	5	.722	26	–	8	.765
No. 13 Tennessee	13	–	5	.722	26	–	9	.743
No. 23 Florida	11	–	7	.611	21	–	13	.618
No. 18 Kentucky †	10	–	8	.556	26	–	11	.703
Missouri	10	–	8	.556	20	–	13	.606
Arkansas	10	–	8	.556	23	–	12	.657
Mississippi State	9	–	9	.500	25	–	12	.676
Texas A&M	9	–	9	.500	22	–	13	.629
Alabama	8	–	10	.444	20	–	16	.556
LSU	8	–	10	.444	18	–	15	.545
Georgia	7	–	11	.389	18	–	15	.545
South Carolina	7	–	11	.389	17	–	16	.515
Vanderbilt	6	–	12	.333	12	–	20	.375
Ole Miss	5	–	13	.278	12	–	20	.375
† 2018 SEC tournament winner Rankings from AP poll

The 2017–18 LSU Tigers basketball team represented Louisiana State University during the 2017–18 NCAA Division I men's basketball season. The team's head coach was Will Wade, in his first season at LSU. They played their home games at the Pete Maravich Assembly Center in Baton Rouge, Louisiana, as a member of the Southeastern Conference. They finished the season 18–15, 8–10 in SEC play to finish in a tie for ninth place. They lost in the second round of the SEC tournament to Mississippi State. The Tigers received an invitation to the National Invitation Tournament, where they defeated Louisiana before losing to Utah in the second round.

== Previous season ==
The Tigers finished the 2016–17 season 10–21, 2–16 in SEC play to finish in a tie for 13th place. They lost in the first round of the SEC tournament to Mississippi State.

On March 10, head coach Johnny Jones was fired. He finished at LSU with a five-year record of 90–72. On March 20, LSU hired VCU head coach Will Wade as their next head coach.

== Offseason ==
=== Departures ===
Name	Number	Pos.	Height	Weight	Year	Hometown	Reason for departure
Antonio Blakeney	2	G	6'4"	197	Sophomore	Sarasota, FL	Declared for 2017 NBA draft
Elbert Robinson III	3	C	7'1"	290	Junior	Garland, TX	Left the team for personal reasons
Kieran Hayward	5	G	6'4"	195	Freshman	Sydney, Australia	Transferred to Massachusetts
Branden Jenkins	10	G	6'4"	180	Junior	Maywood, IL	Graduate transferred to Texas Wesleyan
Jalyn Patterson	11	G	6'1"	191	Junior	Atlanta, GA	Left the team for personal reasons
Brian Bridgewater	20	F	6'5"	282	Senior	Baton Rouge, LA	Graduated
Craig Victor II	32	F	6'9"	235	Junior	New Orleans, LA	Dismissed from the team due to violation of team rules/2017 NBA draft
Brandon Eddlestone	45	F	6'8"	248	Senior	Slidell, LA	Walk-on; graduated

=== Incoming transfers ===
Name	Number	Pos.	Height	Weight	Year	Hometown	Previous school
Daryl Edwards	5	G	6'4"	170	Junior	Fresno, CA	Junior college transferred to Northwest Florida State College
Kavell Bigby-Williams	11	F	6'11"	230	Senior	London, England	Transferred from Oregon. Under NCAA transfer rules, Bigby-Williams had to sit out for the 2017–18 season. Had one year of remaining eligibility.
Jeremy Combs	13	F	6'7"	215	Senior	Dallas, TX	Transferred from North Texas. Was eligible to play, since he graduated from North Texas.
Randy Onwausor	14	G	6'3"	210	RS senior	Inglewood, CA	Transferred from Southern Utah. Was eligible to play, since he graduated from Southern Utah.

=== 2017 recruiting class ===
College recruiting
Name	Hometown	School	Height	Weight	Commit date
Tremont Waters #8 PG	New Haven, CT	Notre Dame High School	5 ft 11 in (1.80 m)	165 lb (75 kg)	Jun 5, 2017
Tremont Waters #8 PG	Recruit ratings: Scout: Rivals: 247Sports: ESPN:				
Galen Alexander; SF	Lafayette, LA	Lafayette Christian Academy	6 ft 7 in (2.01 m)	220 lb (100 kg)	Jul 17, 2016
Galen Alexander; SF	Recruit ratings: Scout: Rivals: 247Sports: ESPN:				
Mayan Kiir #20 PF	Bradenton, FL	Victory Rock Prep	6 ft 9 in (2.06 m)	215 lb (98 kg)	Apr 11, 2017
Mayan Kiir #20 PF	Recruit ratings: Scout: Rivals: 247Sports: ESPN:				
Brandon Rachal #29 SF	Natchitoches, LA	Natchitoches Central High School	6 ft 6 in (1.98 m)	220 lb (100 kg)	Oct 12, 2016
Brandon Rachal #29 SF	Recruit ratings: Scout: Rivals: 247Sports: ESPN:				
Overall recruit ranking:
Note: In many cases, Scout, Rivals, 247Sports, On3, and ESPN may conflict in their listings of height and weight.; In these cases, the average was taken. ESPN grades are on a 100-point scale.; Sources: "LSU 2017 Basketball Commitments". Rivals.; "2017 LSU Basketball Commits". Scout.; "ESPN". ESPN.; "Scout.com Team Recruiting Rankings". Scout.; "2017 Team Ranking". Rivals.

=== 2018 recruiting class ===
College recruiting (2018)
Name	Hometown	School	Height	Weight	Commit date
Javonte Smart; PG	Baton Rouge, LA	Scotlandville Magnet High School	6 ft 4 in (1.93 m)	190 lb (86 kg)	Jun 30, 2017
Javonte Smart; PG	Recruit ratings: Scout: Rivals: 247Sports: ESPN:				
Naz Reid; PF	Asbury Park, NJ	Roselle Catholic High School	6 ft 9 in (2.06 m)	220 lb (100 kg)	Sep 12, 2017
Naz Reid; PF	Recruit ratings: Scout: Rivals: 247Sports: ESPN:				
Darius Days; PF	Williston, FL	The Rock School	6 ft 7 in (2.01 m)	218 lb (99 kg)	Oct 20, 2017
Darius Days; PF	Recruit ratings: Scout: Rivals: 247Sports: ESPN:				
Emmitt Williams; PF	Lehigh Acres, FL	Oak Ridge High School	6 ft 7 in (2.01 m)	215 lb (98 kg)	Jan 26, 2018
Emmitt Williams; PF	Recruit ratings: Scout: Rivals: 247Sports: ESPN:				
Overall recruit ranking:
Note: In many cases, Scout, Rivals, 247Sports, On3, and ESPN may conflict in their listings of height and weight.; In these cases, the average was taken. ESPN grades are on a 100-point scale.; Sources: "LSU 2018 Basketball Commitments". Rivals.; "2018 LSU Basketball Commits". Scout.; "ESPN". ESPN.; "Scout.com Team Recruiting Rankings". Scout.; "2018 Team Ranking". Rivals.

== Roster ==
2017–18 LSU Tigers men's basketball team
Players
Coaches

Pos.	#	Name	Height	Weight	Year	Previous school	Hometown
G	0	Brandon Sampson	6 ft 5 in (1.96 m)	184 lb (83 kg)	Jr	Madison Preparatory Academy	Baton Rouge, Louisiana
F	1	Duop Reath	6 ft 11 in (2.11 m)	244 lb (111 kg)	Sr	Lee College	Perth, Australia
G	2	Brandon Rachal	6 ft 5 in (1.96 m)	215 lb (98 kg)	Fr	Natchitoches Central High School	Natchitoches, Louisiana
G	3	Tremont Waters	5 ft 11 in (1.8 m)	167 lb (76 kg)	Fr	Notre Dame High School	New Haven, Connecticut
G	4	Skylar Mays	6 ft 4 in (1.93 m)	200 lb (91 kg)	So	Findlay Prep	Baton Rouge, Louisiana
G	5	Daryl Edwards	6 ft 3 in (1.91 m)	165 lb (75 kg)	Jr	Northwest Florida State	Fresno, California
F	10	Galen Alexander	6 ft 6 in (1.98 m)	210 lb (95 kg)	Fr	Lafayette Christian Academy	Breaux Bridge, Louisiana
F	11	Kavell Bigby-Williams (I) (redshirt)	6 ft 11 in (2.11 m)	230 lb (104 kg)	Sr	Oregon	London, England
G	12	Marshall Graves (W)	6 ft 3 in (1.91 m)	190 lb (86 kg)	So	Louisiana State University Laboratory School	Ponchatoula, Louisiana
F	13	Jeremy Combs	6 ft 7 in (2.01 m)	215 lb (98 kg)	Sr	North Texas	Dallas, Texas
G	14	Randy Onwausor	6 ft 3 in (1.91 m)	210 lb (95 kg)	RS Sr	Southern Utah	Inglewood, California
G	15	Reed Vial (W)	6 ft 3 in (1.91 m)	189 lb (86 kg)	Jr	Parkview Baptist High School	Baton Rouge, Louisiana
F	21	Aaron Epps	6 ft 10 in (2.08 m)	214 lb (97 kg)	Sr	Tioga High School	Ball, Louisiana
F	35	Mayan Kiir	6 ft 9 in (2.06 m)	201 lb (91 kg)	Fr	Victory Rock Prep	Bradenton, Florida
F	44	Wayde Sims	6 ft 6 in (1.98 m)	217 lb (98 kg)	So	Louisiana State University Laboratory School	Baton Rouge, Louisiana

Head coach

- Will Wade (Clemson)

Assistant coach(es)

- Bill Armstrong (UAB)
- Tony Benford (Texas Tech)
- Greg Heiar (Franciscan)

Legend

- (C) Team captain
- (S) Suspended
- (I) Ineligible
- (W) Walk-on
- Injured
- Current redshirt

Roster

== Schedule and results ==
Date time, TV	Rank^{#}	Opponent^{#}	Result	Record	High points	High rebounds	High assists	Site (attendance) city, state
Exhibition
Oct 31, 2017*; 7:30 pm		at Tulane; Hurricane relief charity game	L 74–84	–	21 – Reath	13 – Reath	3 – Sims	Devlin Fieldhouse (1,503); New Orleans, LA
Non-conference regular season
Nov 10, 2017*; 7:00 pm, SECN+		Alcorn State	W 99–59	1–0	27 – Waters	6 – Rachal	6 – Waters	Maravich Center (11,856); Baton Rouge, LA
Nov 16, 2017*; 7:00 pm, SECN+		Samford	W 105–86	2–0	20 – Mays, Sampson	8 – Sampson	8 – Waters	Maravich Center (7,731); Baton Rouge, LA
Nov 20, 2017*; 10:30 pm, ESPNU		vs. Michigan; Maui Invitational quarterfinals	W 77–75	3–0	21 – Waters	5 – Mays, Reath	4 – Rachal, Waters	Lahaina Civic Center (N/A); Maui, HI
Nov 21, 2017*; 9:30 pm, ESPN		vs. No. 13 Notre Dame; Maui Invitational semifinals	L 53–92	3–1	14 – Reath	6 – Reath	4 – Onwuasor	Lahaina Civic Center (2,400); Maui, HI
Nov 22, 2017*; 7:00 pm, ESPN2		vs. Marquette; Maui Invitational 3rd place game	L 84–94	3–2	39 – Waters	7 – Sims	4 – Waters	Lahaina Civic Center (2,400); Maui, HI
Nov 29, 2017*; 7:00 pm, SECN+		UT Martin	W 84–60	4–2	18 – Mays	9 – Reath	10 – Waters	Maravich Center (7,396); Baton Rouge, LA
Dec 10, 2017*; 4:00 pm, SECN+		UNC Wilmington	W 97–84	5–2	30 – Reath	9 – Waters	10 – Waters	Maravich Center (7,812); Baton Rouge, LA
Dec 13, 2017*; 7:00 pm, SECN		Houston	W 80–77	6–2	26 – Epps	16 – Epps	6 – Waters	Maravich Center (8,449); Baton Rouge, LA
Dec 16, 2017*; 12:00 pm, SECN		Stephen F. Austin	L 82–83	6–3	19 – Waters	10 – Epps	6 – Mays	Maravich Center (9,695); Baton Rouge, LA
Dec 19, 2017*; 7:00 pm, SECN+		Sam Houston State	W 80–58	7–3	13 – Mays, Onwuasor	10 – Sims	5 – Mays	Maravich Center (8,151); Baton Rouge, LA
Dec 22, 2017*; 7:00 pm, SECN+		North Florida	W 104–52	8–3	15 – Reath, Waters	9 – Epps	10 – Waters	Maravich Center (8,212); Baton Rouge, LA
Dec 28, 2017*; 8:00 pm, CBSSN		at Memphis	W 71–61	9–3	18 – Waters	7 – Sims	8 – Waters	FedEx Forum (9,468); Memphis, TN
SEC regular season
Jan 3, 2018; 7:30 pm, SECN		No. 17 Kentucky	L 71–74	9–4 (0–1)	24 – Reath	11 – Waters	4 – Sampson	Maravich Center (11,952); Baton Rouge, LA
Jan 6, 2018; 1:05 pm, SECN		at No. 11 Texas A&M	W 69–68	10–4 (1–1)	21 – Waters	10 – Reath	6 – Mays	Reed Arena (10,845); College Station, TX
Jan 10, 2018; 8:00 pm, SECN		at Arkansas	W 75–54	11–4 (2–1)	13 – Epps	11 – Epps	8 – Waters	Bud Walton Arena (15,199); Fayetteville, AR
Jan 13, 2018; 7:30 pm, SECN		Alabama	L 66–74	11–5 (2–2)	19 – Waters	4 – Epps, Rachal, Onwuasor	5 – Waters	Maravich Center (13,600); Baton Rouge, LA
Jan 16, 2018; 6:00 pm, ESPNU		Georgia	L 60–61	11–6 (2–3)	17 – Sampson	7 – Mays	5 – Waters	Maravich Center (13,215); Baton Rouge, LA
Jan 20, 2018; 12:00 pm, SECN		at Vanderbilt	L 71–77	11–7 (2–4)	31 – Reath	13 – Reath	4 – Waters	Memorial Gymnasium (8,760); Nashville, TN
Jan 23, 2018; 5:30 pm, ESPNU		Texas A&M	W 77–65	12–7 (3–4)	21 – Reath	8 – Reath	9 – Waters	Maravich Center (8,528); Baton Rouge, LA
Jan 27, 2018; 5:00 pm, SECN		at No. 19 Auburn	L 70–95	12–8 (3–5)	18 – Reath	4 – Mays	5 – Mays	Auburn Arena (9,121); Auburn, AL
Jan 31, 2018; 5:30 pm, SECN		at No. 18 Tennessee	L 61–84	12–9 (3–6)	21 – Reath	7 – Epps	3 – Onwuasor, Waters	Thompson–Boling Arena (13,425); Knoxville, TN
Feb 3, 2018; 2:30 pm, SECN		Arkansas	W 94–86	13–9 (4–6)	27 – Waters	6 – Sims	11 – Waters	Maravich Center (9,272); Baton Rouge, LA
Feb 7, 2018; 5:30 pm, SECN		at Florida	L 64–73	13–10 (4–7)	17 – Sampson	7 – Waters	6 – Waters	O'Connell Center (9,833); Gainesville, FL
Feb 10, 2018; 3:00 pm, ESPNU		Ole Miss	W 82–66	14–10 (5–7)	26 – Reath	9 – Epps	8 – Waters	Maravich Center (8,545); Baton Rouge, LA
Feb 13, 2018; 8:000 pm, ESPNU		at Alabama	L 65–80	14–11 (5–8)	21 – Edwards	9 – Mays	4 – Waters	Coleman Coliseum (11,154); Tuscaloosa, AL
Feb 17, 2018; 1:00 pm, ESPN2		Missouri	W 64–63	15–11 (6–8)	21 – Waters	9 – Epps	4 – Mays, Waters	Maravich Center (9,635); Baton Rouge, LA
Feb 20, 2018; 8:00 pm, SECN		Vanderbilt	W 88–78	16–11 (7–8)	28 – Waters	8 – Epps	9 – Waters	Maravich Center (7,517); Baton Rouge, LA
Feb 24, 2018; 1:00 pm, ESPNU		at Georgia	L 82–93	16–12 (7–9)	25 – Waters	6 – Sampson	3 – Waters	Stegeman Coliseum (9,518); Athens, GA
Feb 28, 2018; 5:30 pm, SECN		at South Carolina	L 74–83 ^{OT}	16–13 (7–10)	19 – Waters	13 – Rachal	6 – Mays	Colonial Life Arena (11,269); Columbia, SC
Mar 3, 2018; 12:00 pm, SECN		Mississippi State	W 78–57	17–13 (8–10)	16 – Epps, Sampson	8 – Reath	10 – Waters	Maravich Center (9,067); Baton Rouge, LA
SEC Tournament
Mar 8, 2018; 6:00 pm, SECN	(10)	vs. (7) Mississippi State; Second Round	L 77–80	17–14	28 – Waters	9 – Rachal	6 – Waters	Scottrade Center (11,752); St. Louis, MO
NIT
Mar 14, 2018*; 6:00 pm, ESPN3	(3)	(6) Louisiana; First Round – Saint Mary's Bracket	W 84–76	18–14	26 – Reath	11 – Reath	7 – Waters	Maravich Center (6,846); Baton Rouge, LA
Mar 19, 2018; 8:00 pm, ESPNU	(3)	at (2) Utah; Second Round – Saint Mary's Bracket	L 71–95	18–15	19 – Waters	6 – Epps	8 – Waters	Jon M. Huntsman Center (5,528); Salt Lake City, UT
*Non-conference game. ^{#}Rankings from AP Poll. (#) Tournament seedings in parentheses. All times are in Central Time.
