= 2017–18 Ole Miss Rebels men's basketball team =

American college basketball season

2017–18 Ole Miss Rebels men's basketball
- Conference: Southeastern Conference
- Record: 12–20 (5–13 SEC)
- Head coach: Andy Kennedy (First 27 games); Tony Madlock (interim)
- Assistant coaches: Todd Abernathy (3rd season); Rahim Lockhart (1st season)
- Home arena: The Pavilion at Ole Miss

2017–18 Southeastern Conference men's basketball standings
	Conf.				Overall
Team	W		L	PCT	W		L	PCT
No. 19 Auburn	13	–	5	.722	26	–	8	.765
No. 13 Tennessee	13	–	5	.722	26	–	9	.743
No. 23 Florida	11	–	7	.611	21	–	13	.618
No. 18 Kentucky †	10	–	8	.556	26	–	11	.703
Missouri	10	–	8	.556	20	–	13	.606
Arkansas	10	–	8	.556	23	–	12	.657
Mississippi State	9	–	9	.500	25	–	12	.676
Texas A&M	9	–	9	.500	22	–	13	.629
Alabama	8	–	10	.444	20	–	16	.556
LSU	8	–	10	.444	18	–	15	.545
Georgia	7	–	11	.389	18	–	15	.545
South Carolina	7	–	11	.389	17	–	16	.515
Vanderbilt	6	–	12	.333	12	–	20	.375
Ole Miss	5	–	13	.278	12	–	20	.375
† 2018 SEC tournament winner Rankings from AP poll

The 2017–18 Ole Miss Rebels men's basketball team represented the University of Mississippi in the 2017–18 NCAA Division I men's basketball season, their 108th basketball season. They were coached by Andy Kennedy for the first 27 games of the season before he left the position on February 19, 2018. The Rebels named assistant coach Tony Madlock interim head coach for the remainder of the season. The Rebels played their second full season in The Pavilion at Ole Miss in Oxford, Mississippi as members of the Southeastern Conference. They finished the season 12–20, 5–13 in SEC play to finish in last place. They lost in the first round of the SEC tournament to South Carolina.

On February 12, 2018, 12th-year head coach Andy Kennedy, the school's all-time winningest head coach, and the school mutually agreed to part ways following the end of the season. However, on February 19, Kennedy announced that he would depart immediately, with assistant Madlock taking over on an interim basis. On March 15, 2018, it was announced that Ole Miss had hired Middle Tennessee head coach Kermit Davis as head coach of the Rebels.

== Previous season ==
The Rebels finished the 2016–17 season 22–14, 10–8 in SEC play to finish in a three-way tie for fifth place. They defeated Missouri in the second round of the SEC tournament before losing in the quarterfinals to Arkansas. They were invited to the National Invitation Tournament where they defeated Monmouth and Syracuse before losing in the quarterfinals to Georgia Tech.

== Offseason ==
=== Coaching changes ===
On April 24, 2017 Ole Miss announced the hiring of former Rebel basketball player Rahim Lockhart as an assistant coach on the Rebel basketball team. On May 8, 2017 Ole Miss assistant coach Bill Armstrong left the Rebels to take the same position at Louisiana State University.

=== Departures ===
Name	Number	Pos.	Height	Weight	Year	Hometown	Reason left
Donte Fitzpatrick-Dorsey	0	Guard	6'4"	183	Sophomore	Memphis, Tennessee	Requested release from program.
Cullen Neal	2	Guard	6'5"	195	Redshirt Junior	Albuquerque, New Mexico	Transferred to Saint Mary's.
Sebastian Saiz	11	Forward	6'9"	233	Senior	Madrid, Spain	Graduated
Rasheed Brooks	14	Guard	6'5"	201	Senior	Mansfield, Ohio	Graduated
Nate Morris	32	Center	6'9"	240	Freshman	Dallas, Texas	Dismissed from program; later went to JBA.

=== 2017 recruiting class ===
College recruiting information
Name	Hometown	School	Height	Weight	Commit date
Devontae Shuler #24 SG	Mouth of Wilson, Virginia	Oak Hill Academy	6 ft 3 in (1.91 m)	180 lb (82 kg)	Oct 10, 2016
Devontae Shuler #24 SG	Recruit ratings: Scout: Rivals: 247Sports: ESPN:				
Bruce Stevens #3 JUCO C	Bay Springs, Mississippi	Jones County Junior College	6 ft 8 in (2.03 m)	257 lb (117 kg)	Mar 27, 2017
Bruce Stevens #3 JUCO C	Recruit ratings: Scout: Rivals: 247Sports: ESPN:				
Ilya Tyrtyshnik; G	Kyiv, Ukraine	GBA Prague	6 ft 3 in (1.91 m)	N/A	Jun 5, 2017
Ilya Tyrtyshnik; G	Recruit ratings: Scout: Rivals: 247Sports: ESPN:				
David Davis; G	Purvis, Mississippi	Jones County Junior College	6 ft 1 in (1.85 m)	174 lb (79 kg)	Jun 5, 2017
David Davis; G	Recruit ratings: Scout: Rivals: 247Sports: ESPN:				
Overall recruit ranking:
Note: In many cases, Scout, Rivals, 247Sports, On3, and ESPN may conflict in their listings of height and weight.; In these cases, the average was taken. ESPN grades are on a 100-point scale.; Sources: "Ole Miss 2017 Basketball Commitments". Rivals.; "2017 Ole Miss Basketball Commits". Scout.; "ESPN". ESPN.; "Scout.com Team Recruiting Rankings". Scout.; "2017 Team Ranking". Rivals.

=== 2018 recruiting class ===
College recruiting information
Name	Hometown	School	Height	Weight	Commit date
Brian Halums; SG	Hollandale, MS	Itawamba Community College	6 ft 5 in (1.96 m)	185 lb (84 kg)	Sep 21, 2017
Brian Halums; SG	Recruit ratings: Scout: Rivals: 247Sports: ESPN:				
Anthony Higgs; SF	Baltimore, MD	Perry Hall High School	6 ft 8 in (2.03 m)	200 lb (91 kg)	Sep 27, 2017
Anthony Higgs; SF	Recruit ratings: Scout: Rivals: 247Sports: ESPN:				
KJ Buffen; SF	Gainesville, GA	Gainesville High School	6 ft 7 in (2.01 m)	205 lb (93 kg)	Apr 25, 2018
KJ Buffen; SF	Recruit ratings: Scout: Rivals: 247Sports: ESPN:				
Blake Hinson; PF	Deltona, FL	Sunrise Christian Academy	6 ft 7 in (2.01 m)	230 lb (100 kg)	Apr 28, 2018
Blake Hinson; PF	Recruit ratings: Scout: Rivals: 247Sports: ESPN:				
Overall recruit ranking:
Note: In many cases, Scout, Rivals, 247Sports, On3, and ESPN may conflict in their listings of height and weight.; In these cases, the average was taken. ESPN grades are on a 100-point scale.; Sources: "Ole Miss 2018 Basketball Commitments". Rivals.; "2018 Team Ranking". Rivals.

== Roster ==
2017–18 Ole Miss Rebels men's basketball team
Players
Coaches

Pos.	#	Name	Height	Weight	Year	Previous school	Hometown
G	0	Devontae Shuler	6 ft 2 in (1.88 m)	192 lb (87 kg)	Fr	Oak Hill Academy	Irmo, SC
G	1	Deandre Burnett	6 ft 2 in (1.88 m)	192 lb (87 kg)	RS Sr	Miami Carol City Sr. HS; Miami (FL)	Miami Gardens, FL
F	2	Marcanvis Hymon	6 ft 7 in (2.01 m)	220 lb (100 kg)	Sr	Whitehaven HS	Memphis, TN
G	3	Terence Davis	6 ft 4 in (1.93 m)	201 lb (91 kg)	Jr	Southaven HS	Southaven, MS
G	4	Breein Tyree	6 ft 2 in (1.88 m)	192 lb (87 kg)	So	St. Joseph HS	Somerset, NJ
G	5	Markel Crawford	6 ft 4 in (1.93 m)	210 lb (95 kg)	Sr	Melrose, Memphis, Tennessee	Memphis, TN
C	12	Bruce Stevens	6 ft 8 in (2.03 m)	252 lb (114 kg)	Jr	Jones County JC	Bay Springs, MS
C	13	Dominik Olejniczak	7 ft 0 in (2.13 m)	255 lb (116 kg)	RS So	SMS Cetniewo Academy; Drake	Toruń, Poland
G	20	David Davis	5 ft 11 in (1.8 m)	175 lb (79 kg)	Jr	Purvis HS; Jones Count JC	Purvis, MS
C	22	Karlis Silins	6 ft 11 in (2.11 m)	245 lb (111 kg)	So	BK VEF Rīga	Riga, Latvia
G	24	Lane Below	6 ft 1 in (1.85 m)	185 lb (84 kg)	Sr	Advance HS; Three Rivers CC	Advance, MO
F	30	Jake Coddington	6 ft 6 in (1.98 m)	212 lb (96 kg)	RS Sr	Marquette Catholic HS; Three Rivers CC	Edwardsville, IL
G	34	Ilya Tyrtyshnik	6 ft 3 in (1.91 m)	185 lb (84 kg)	Fr	Get Better Academy	Kyiv, Ukraine
F	50	Justas Furmanavičius	6 ft 7 in (2.01 m)	210 lb (95 kg)	Sr	Three Rivers CC	Kaunas, Lithuania

Head coach

- Tony Madlock (Memphis)

Assistant coach(es)

- Todd Abernethy (Mississippi)
- Rahim Lockhart (Mississippi)

Legend

- (C) Team captain
- (S) Suspended
- (I) Ineligible
- (W) Walk-on
- Injured
- Current redshirt

Roster

== Schedule and results ==
On June 27, 2017 Mississippi announced its 2017–18 non-conference schedule, highlighted by opponents such as Virginia Tech, Middle Tennessee, Illinois State, and Texas. The Rebels will also face Utah and Rice in the MGM Resorts Main Event.

Date time, TV	Rank^{#}	Opponent^{#}	Result	Record	High points	High rebounds	High assists	Site (attendance) city, state
Exhibition
November 5, 2017*; 3:00 pm, SECN+		North Alabama	W 94–53		18 – Shuler	10 – Hymon	6 – Tyree	The Pavilion at Ole Miss; Oxford, MS
Regular Season
November 10, 2017*; 7:30 pm, SECN+		Louisiana	W 94–76	1–0	21 – Davis	13 – Hymon	4 – Davis	The Pavilion at Ole Miss (8,302); Oxford, MS
November 13, 2017*; 5:30 pm, SECN+		Eastern Kentucky; MGM Resorts Main Event campus-site game	W 85–75	2–0	17 – Burnett	10 – Hymon	5 – Crawford	The Pavilion at Ole Miss (7,042); Oxford, MS
November 17, 2017*; 6:00 pm, SECN+		Georgia State; MGM Resorts Main Event campus-site game	W 77–72	3–0	24 – Davis	6 – Davis	6 – Burnett	The Pavilion at Ole Miss (6,835); Oxford, MS
November 20, 2017*; 11:30 pm, AT&T SportsNet		vs. Utah; MGM Resorts Main Event Heavyweight semifinals	L 74–83	3–1	21 – Burnett	4 – Burnett	3 – Davis	T-Mobile Arena (8,107); Paradise, NV
November 22, 2017*; 9:00 pm, ESPNU		vs. Rice; MGM Resorts Main Event Heavyweight 3rd Place game	W 79–62	4–1	18 – Burnett	9 – Hymon	8 – Burnett	T-Mobile Arena (8,424); Paradise, NV
November 28, 2017*; 7:00 pm, SECN+		South Dakota State	L 97–99 ^{OT}	4–2	22 – Davis	8 – Hymon	6 – Burnett	The Pavilion at Ole Miss (6,014); Oxford, MS
December 2nd, 2017*; 1:00 pm, SECN+		Virginia Tech	L 80–83 ^{OT}	4–3	17 – Tyree	8 – Tyree	8 – Burnett	The Pavilion at Ole Miss (6,297); Oxford, MS
December 9, 2017*; 5:00 pm, Stadium		at Middle Tennessee	L 58–77	4–4	12 – Hymon	8 – Davis	4 – Tied	Murphy Center (8,806); Murfreesboro, TN
December 13, 2017*; 7:00 pm, SECN+		Sam Houston State	W 82–69	5–4	16 – Crawford	9 – Hymon	6 – Burnett	The Pavilion at Ole Miss (5,054); Oxford, MS
December 16, 2017*; 2:30 pm, SECN		Illinois State	L 97–101 ^{OT}	5–5	27 – Stevens	9 – Davis	6 – Tyree	The Pavilion at Ole Miss (6,309); Oxford, MS
December 19, 2017*; 6:00 pm, SECN		Texas A&M–Corpus Christi	W 85–63	6–5	15 – Tied	6 – Tied	8 – Burnett	The Pavilion at Ole Miss (6,102); Oxford, MS
December 22, 2017*; 6:00 pm, SECN+		Bradley	W 82–59	7–5	16 – Crawford	8 – Furmanavičius	5 – Crawford	The Pavilion at Ole Miss (7,993); Oxford, MS
December 31, 2017; 5:00 pm, ESPN2		South Carolina	W 74–69	8–5 (1–0)	18 – Burnett	5 – Davis	6 – Burnett	The Pavilion at Ole Miss (5,849); Oxford, MS
January 3, 2018; 5:30 pm, SECN		at Georgia	L 60–71	8–6 (1–1)	17 – Tyree	7 – Olejniczak	3 – Burnett	Stegeman Coliseum (7,515); Athens, GA
January 6, 2018; 3:30 pm, SECN		Mississippi State	W 64–58	9–6 (2–1)	21 – Burnett	5 – Burnett	3 – Burnett	The Pavilion at Ole Miss (8,664); Oxford, MS
January 9, 2018; 8:00 pm, ESPNU		at No. 22 Auburn	L 70–85	9–7 (2–2)	24 – Tyree	10 – Tied	4 – Tyree	Auburn Arena (9,121); Auburn, AL
January 13, 2018; 12:00 pm, CBS		Florida	W 78–72	10–7 (3–2)	22 – Stevens	9 – Hyman	6 – Burnett	The Pavilion at Ole Miss (6,547); Oxford, MS
January 16, 2018; 8:00 pm, SECN		at Texas A&M	L 69–71	10–8 (3–3)	20 – Stevens	9 – Stevens	8 – Burnett	Reed Arena (10,578); College Station, TX
January 20, 2018; 2:30 pm, SECN		at Arkansas	L 93–97	10–9 (3–4)	30 – Davis	8 – Hyman	5 – Tyree	Bud Walton Arena (18,030); Fayetteville, AR
January 23, 2018; 7:30 pm, SECN		Alabama	W 78–66	11–9 (4–4)	24 – Burnett	9 – Davis	4 – Tied	The Pavilion at Ole Miss (8,099); Oxford, MS
January 27, 2018*; 1:00 pm, ESPN2		at Texas; Big 12/SEC Challenge	L 72–85	11–10	21 – Burnett	8 – Crawford	2 – Tied	Frank Erwin Center (10,913); Austin, TX
January 30, 2018; 8:00 pm, SECN		No. 11 Auburn	L 70–79	11–11 (4–5)	16 – Burnett	8 – Tied	5 – Burnett	The Pavilion at Ole Miss (9,121); Oxford, MS
February 3, 2018; 5:00 pm, SECN		at No. 18 Tennessee	L 61–94	11–12 (4–6)	16 – Stevens	9 – T. Davis	5 – Tyree	Thompson–Boling Arena (18,316); Knoxville, TN
February 6, 2018; 8:00 pm, SECN		Missouri	L 69–75	11–13 (4–7)	20 – T. Davis	7 – Stevens	6 – Crawford	The Pavilion at Ole Miss (6,204); Oxford, MS
February 10, 2018; 3:00 pm, ESPNU		at LSU	L 66–82	11–14 (4–8)	16 – Stevens	9 – Davis	2 – Davis	Maravich Center (8,545); Baton Rouge, LA
February 13, 2018; 6:00 pm, SECN		Arkansas	L 64–75	11–15 (4–9)	24 – Burnett	13 – Davis	3 – Burnett	The Pavilion at Ole Miss (6,023); Oxford, MS
February 17, 2018; 7:30 pm, SECN		at Mississippi State	L 62–79	11–16 (4–10)	15 – Tyree	9 – Crawford	3 – Davis	Humphrey Coliseum (9,002); Starkville, FL
February 20, 2018; 8:00 pm, ESPN2		at Missouri	W 90–87 ^{OT}	12–16 (5–10)	25 – Tyree	8 – Stevens	4 – Burnett	Mizzou Arena (15,061); Columbia, MO
February 24, 2018; 12:00 pm, SECN		No. 19 Tennessee	L 65–73	12–17 (5–11)	17 – Tyree	9 – Crawford	3 – Hymon	The Pavilion at Ole Miss (8,149); Oxford, MS
February 28, 2018; 6:00 pm, ESPN2		at No. 23 Kentucky	L 78–96	12–18 (5–12)	26 – Davis	13 – Stevens	7 – Tyree	Rupp Arena (22,108); Lexington, KY
March 3, 2018; 7:30 pm, SECN		Vanderbilt	L 69–82	12–19 (5–13)	17 – Stevens	5 – Davis	6 – Tyree	The Pavilion at Ole Miss (6,447); Oxford, MS
SEC tournament
March 7, 2018; 8:30 pm, SECN	(14)	vs. (11) South Carolina; First round	L 84–85	12–20	16 – Davis	13 – Stevens	4 – Burnett	Scottrade Center (8,190); St. Louis, MO
*Non-conference game. ^{#}Rankings from AP Poll. (#) Tournament seedings in parentheses. All times are in Central Time.

== See also ==
•2018 Ole Miss Rebels football team
•2018 Ole Miss Rebels baseball team
•2017-18 Ole Miss Rebels women's basketball team
