= Quade Green =

American basketball player (born 1998)

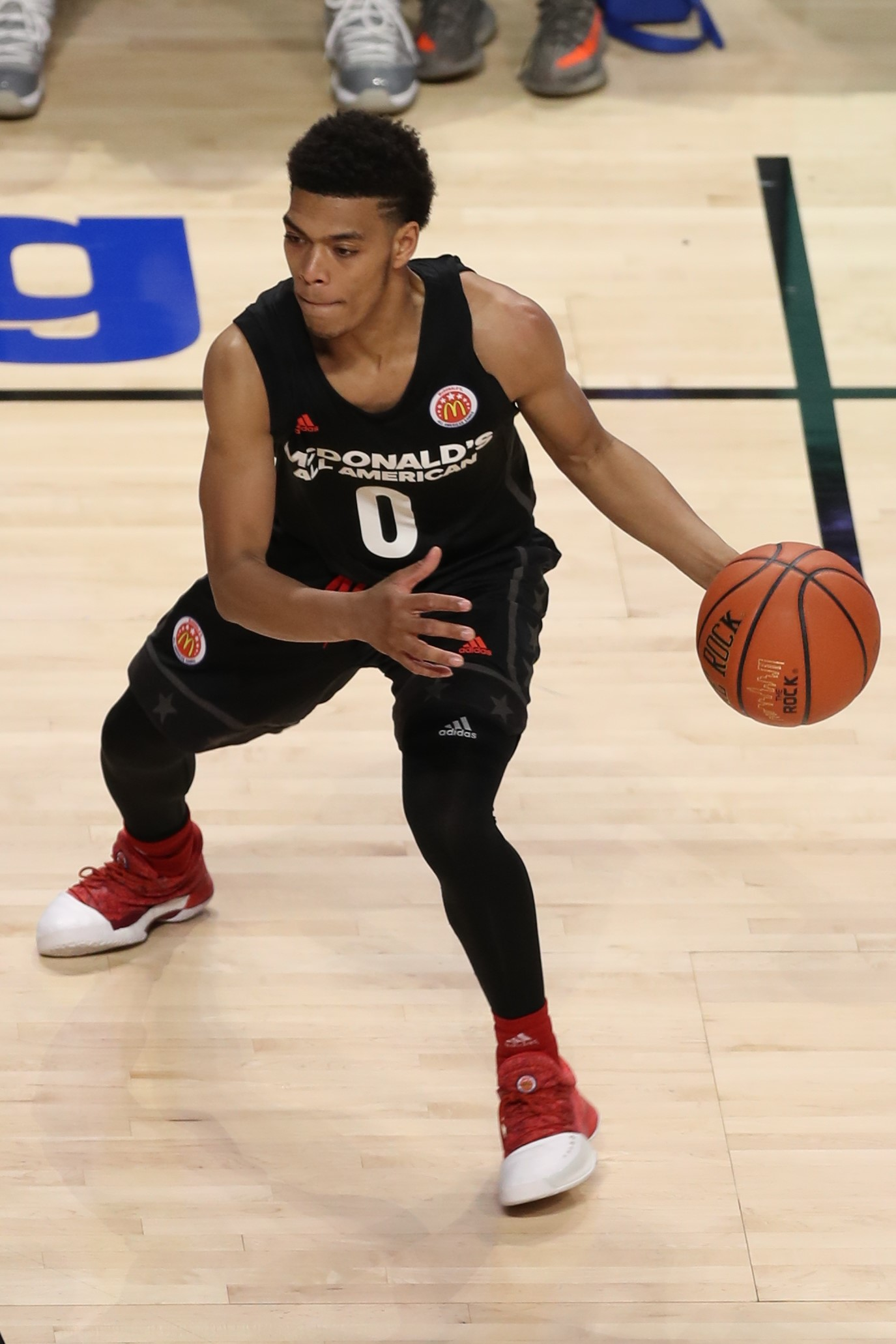
- Green at the 2017 McDonald's All-American Game

No. 0 – Suke Lions
- Position: Point guard
- League: NBL

Personal information
- Born: May 12, 1998 (age 28) Philadelphia, Pennsylvania, U.S.
- Listed height: 6 ft 0 in (1.83 m)
- Listed weight: 170 lb (77 kg)

Career information
- High school: Neumann-Goretti (Philadelphia, Pennsylvania)
- College: Kentucky (2017–2018); Washington (2019–2021)
- NBA draft: 2021: undrafted
- Playing career: 2021–present

Career history
- 2021: Maine Celtics
- 2021: Lakeland Magic
- 2021–2022: Grand Rapids Gold
- 2022: Oklahoma City Blue
- 2023–2024: Centauros de Portuguesa
- 2024: Caledonia Gladiators
- 2024–2025: Golden Eagle Ylli
- 2025: Ostioneros de Guaymas
- 2025–present: Suke Lions

Career highlights
- McDonald's All-American (2017); Nike Hoop Summit (2017)
Medals
Men's basketball
Representing the United States
FIBA Americas U18 Championship
Gold medal – first place	2016 Chile	Team

Quade Green (born May 12, 1998) is an American professional basketball player for Suke Lions of the National Basketball League (NBL). He played college basketball for the Washington Huskies and the Kentucky Wildcats.

== High school career ==
Green attended Saints John Neumann and Maria Goretti Catholic High School in Philadelphia, Pennsylvania, where he won four consecutive Pennsylvania Class 3A state championships.

Green finished his career at Neumann-Goretti with 1,853 points, which ranks second in program history.

In 2016, Green played in the summer for the PSA Cardinals in the Nike EYBL and helped lead his team to a berth in the 2016 Nike Peach Jam. He was named to the All-EYBL first team after averaging 14.1 points and 10.5 assists.

In January 2017, Green was selected as a McDonald's All-American.

Green won the Legends and Stars Shootout competition during the 2017 McDonald's All-American Game.

In February 2017, Green was selected to participate in the Jordan Brand Classic.

=== Recruiting ===
On November 16, 2016, Green committed to attend and play for the University of Kentucky.

College recruiting
Name	Hometown	School	Height	Weight	Commit date
Quade Green; PG	Philadelphia, PA	Neumann–Goretti (PA)	6 ft 1 in (1.85 m)	170 lb (77 kg)	Nov 16, 2016
Quade Green; PG	Recruit ratings: Scout: Rivals: 247Sports: ESPN: (92)				
Overall recruit ranking: Scout: 24 Rivals: 22 247Sports: 33 ESPN: 24
Note: In many cases, Scout, Rivals, 247Sports, On3, and ESPN may conflict in their listings of height and weight.; In these cases, the average was taken. ESPN grades are on a 100-point scale.; Sources: "Kentucky 2017 Basketball Commitments". Rivals.; "2017 Kentucky Wildcats Recruiting Class". ESPN.; "2017 Team Ranking". Rivals.

== College career ==
As a freshman, Green posted 9.3 points and 2.7 assists per game while shooting 37.6 percent from behind the arc. He started 13 of the first 14 games before missing three straight games due to injury. He moved to a bench role after returning from injury. Green scored in double figures eight times in 20 games after returning. Green returned to Kentucky for his sophomore season despite rumors of transferring.

On December 11, he announced he would be transferring from the University of Kentucky. On January 4, 2019, he was welcomed to the University of Washington basketball program. In January 2020 it was announced that Green was ruled academically ineligible for the winter quarter and could possibly return for the postseason. He averaged 11.6 points, 5.3 assists, 2.6 rebounds and 1.1 steals per game while shooting 51.4 percent from the floor and 44.7 percent from 3-point range in 15 games.

== Professional career ==
=== Maine Celtics (2021) ===
After going undrafted in the 2021 NBA draft, Green signed on October 23, 2021, with the Maine Celtics of the NBA G League. He was waived on December 9.

=== Lakeland Magic (2021) ===
On December 21, 2021, the Lakeland Magic claimed Green from the G League available player pool and played two games for the team.

=== Grand Rapids Gold (2021–2022) ===
On December 30, 2021, Green was acquired by the Grand Rapids Gold of the NBA G League.

=== Oklahoma City Blue (2022) ===
On November 21, 2022, Green was acquired by the Oklahoma City Blue. On January 2, 2023, Green was waived.

=== Centauros de Portuguesa (2023–2024) ===
On April 14, 2023, Green signed with Centauros de Portuguesa of the Venezuelan League.

== National team career ==
Green was named to the 2017 USA Junior National Select Team that played in the 20th annual Nike Hoop Summit but was unable to play in the game due to injury.

Green won a gold medal with USA Basketball at the 2016 FIBA Americas U18 Championship. Green averaged 4.6 points, 2.6 assists, and 1.8 rebounds in five games.

Green participated in the 2016 USA Men's Junior National Team October minicamp.

== Career statistics ==
Legend
GP	Games played	GS	Games started	MPG	Minutes per game
FG%	Field goal percentage	3P%	3-point field goal percentage	FT%	Free throw percentage
RPG	Rebounds per game	APG	Assists per game	SPG	Steals per game
BPG	Blocks per game	PPG	Points per game	**Bold**	Career high

=== College ===
Year	Team	GP	GS	MPG	FG%	3P%	FT%	RPG	APG	SPG	BPG	PPG
2017–18	Kentucky	**34**	13	25.6	.451	.376	.808	1.8	2.7	.3	.0	9.3
2018–19	Kentucky	9	0	17.8	.449	.423	**.895**	1.3	2.3	1.0	.0	8.0
2019–20	Washington	15	14	30.4	**.514**	**.447**	.837	2.6	**5.3**	**1.1**	.0	11.6
2020–21	Washington	25	**22**	**31.7**	.428	.313	.868	**3.0**	3.6	**1.1**	.0	**15.4**
Career		83	49	27.4	.450	.367	.847	2.2	3.4	.8	.0	11.4
