= 2017–18 Georgia Bulldogs basketball team =

American college basketball team season

2017–18 Georgia Bulldogs basketball
- Conference: Southeastern Conference
- Record: 18–15 (7–11 SEC)
- Head coach: Mark Fox (9th season)
- Assistant coaches: Philip Pearson; Jonas Hayes; David Carter
- Home arena: Stegeman Coliseum

2017–18 Southeastern Conference men's basketball standings
	Conf.				Overall
Team	W		L	PCT	W		L	PCT
No. 19 Auburn	13	–	5	.722	26	–	8	.765
No. 13 Tennessee	13	–	5	.722	26	–	9	.743
No. 23 Florida	11	–	7	.611	21	–	13	.618
No. 18 Kentucky †	10	–	8	.556	26	–	11	.703
Missouri	10	–	8	.556	20	–	13	.606
Arkansas	10	–	8	.556	23	–	12	.657
Mississippi State	9	–	9	.500	25	–	12	.676
Texas A&M	9	–	9	.500	22	–	13	.629
Alabama	8	–	10	.444	20	–	16	.556
LSU	8	–	10	.444	18	–	15	.545
Georgia	7	–	11	.389	18	–	15	.545
South Carolina	7	–	11	.389	17	–	16	.515
Vanderbilt	6	–	12	.333	12	–	20	.375
Ole Miss	5	–	13	.278	12	–	20	.375
† 2018 SEC tournament winner Rankings from AP poll

The 2017–18 Georgia bulldogs basketball team represented the University of Georgia during the 2017–18 NCAA Division I men's basketball season. The team's head coach was Mark Fox in his ninth season at UGA. They played their home games at Stegeman Coliseum as members of the Southeastern Conference. The Bulldogs finished the season 18–15, 7–11 in SEC play to finish in a tie for 11th place. As the No. 12 seed in the SEC tournament, they defeated Vanderbilt and Missouri before losing to Kentucky in the quarterfinals.

On March 10, 2018, the school fired head coach Mark Fox after nine seasons at Georgia. On March 13, the school hired former Indiana coach Tom Crean to replace Fox.

== Previous season ==
The Bulldogs finished the 2016–17 season 19–15, 9–9 in SEC play to finish in eighth place. They defeated Tennessee in the second round of the SEC tournament to advance to the quarterfinals where they lost to Kentucky. They were invited to the National Invitation Tournament where they lost in the First Round to Belmont.

== Offseason ==
=== Departures ===
Name	Number	Pos.	Height	Weight	Year	Hometown	Reason for departure
Brandon Young	14	G	5'10"	160	Senior	Atlanta, GA	Graduated
Houston Kessler	24	F	6'8"	230	RS Senior	Newnan, GA	Graduated
Kenny Paul Geno	25	F	6'6"	210	Senior	Booneville, MS	Graduated
J. J. Frazier	30	G	5'10"	155	Senior	Gleenville, GA	Graduated

=== 2017 recruiting class ===
College recruiting information
Name	Hometown	School	Height	Weight	Commit date
Rayshaun Hammonds #7 SF	Norcross, GA	Norcross High School	6 ft 7 in (2.01 m)	190 lb (86 kg)	Nov 10, 2016
Rayshaun Hammonds #7 SF	Recruit ratings: Scout: Rivals: 247Sports: ESPN:				
Nicolas Claxton #28 PF	Greenville, SC	Legacy Charter School	6 ft 8 in (2.03 m)	285 lb (129 kg)	Nov 14, 2016
Nicolas Claxton #28 PF	Recruit ratings: Scout: Rivals: 247Sports: ESPN:				
Teshaun Hightower #50 PG	Suwanee, GA	Mount Zion Baptist Christian School	6 ft 5 in (1.96 m)	170 lb (77 kg)	Jan 16, 2017
Teshaun Hightower #50 PG	Recruit ratings: Scout: Rivals: 247Sports: ESPN:				
Isaac Kante; PF	Brooklyn, NY	Putnam Science Academy	6 ft 8 in (2.03 m)	225 lb (102 kg)	May 2, 2017
Isaac Kante; PF	Recruit ratings: Scout: Rivals: 247Sports: ESPN:				
Overall recruit ranking: Scout: Not Ranked Rivals: Not Ranked ESPN: Not Ranked
Note: In many cases, Scout, Rivals, 247Sports, On3, and ESPN may conflict in their listings of height and weight.; In these cases, the average was taken. ESPN grades are on a 100-point scale.; Sources: "Georgia 2017 Basketball Commitments". Rivals.; "2017 Georgia Basketball Commits". Scout.; "ESPN". ESPN.; "Scout.com Team Recruiting Rankings". Scout.; "2017 Team Ranking". Rivals.

=== 2018 recruiting class ===
College recruiting information (2018)
Name	Hometown	School	Height	Weight	Commit date
Amanze Ngumezi; PF	Savannah, GA	Johnson High School	6 ft 9 in (2.06 m)	235 lb (107 kg)	Sep 3, 2017
Amanze Ngumezi; PF	Recruit ratings: Scout: Rivals: 247Sports: ESPN:				
JoJo Toppin; SF	Norcross, GA	Norcross High School	6 ft 6 in (1.98 m)	175 lb (79 kg)	Nov 15, 2017
JoJo Toppin; SF	Recruit ratings: Scout: Rivals: 247Sports: ESPN:				
Tye Fagan; SG	Thomaston, GA	Upson-Lee High School	6 ft 3 in (1.91 m)	170 lb (77 kg)	Apr 30, 2018
Tye Fagan; SG	Recruit ratings: Scout: Rivals: 247Sports: ESPN:				
Ignas Sargiūnas; SG	Kaunas, Lithuania	Jonas Basanavicius Gymnasium	6 ft 4 in (1.93 m)	195 lb (88 kg)	Jun 1, 2018
Ignas Sargiūnas; SG	Recruit ratings: Scout: Rivals: 247Sports: ESPN:				
Overall recruit ranking:
Note: In many cases, Scout, Rivals, 247Sports, On3, and ESPN may conflict in their listings of height and weight.; In these cases, the average was taken. ESPN grades are on a 100-point scale.; Sources: "2018 Georgia Basketball Commitments". Rivals.; "2018 Team Ranking". Rivals.

== Roster ==
2017–18 Georgia Bulldogs men's basketball team
Players
Coaches

Pos.	#	Name	Height	Weight	Year	Previous school	Hometown
G	0	William Jackson II	6 ft 4 in (1.93 m)	185 lb (84 kg)	Jr	Athens Christian School	Athens, GA
F	1	Yante Maten	6 ft 8 in (2.03 m)	240 lb (109 kg)	Sr	Bloomfield Hills HS	Bloomfield Hills, MI
G	2	Jordan Harris	6 ft 4 in (1.93 m)	190 lb (86 kg)	So	Seminole County HS	Iron City, GA
G	3	Juwan Parker	6 ft 4 in (1.93 m)	205 lb (93 kg)	RS Sr	Washington HS	Tulsa, OK
G	4	Tyree Crump	6 ft 1 in (1.85 m)	182 lb (83 kg)	So	Bainbridge HS	Bainbridge, GA
F	5	Pape Diatta	6 ft 7 in (2.01 m)	220 lb (100 kg)	Sr	The Rock; College of Southern Idaho	Dakar, Senegal
G	10	TeShaun Hightower	6 ft 4 in (1.93 m)	180 lb (82 kg)	Fr	Mount Zion Prep	Lithonia, GA
G	11	Christian Harrison (W)	6 ft 4 in (1.93 m)	200 lb (91 kg)	RS Jr	Woodward Academy	Atlanta, GA
F	13	E'Torrion Wilridge	6 ft 6 in (1.98 m)	220 lb (100 kg)	Jr	Central Medical Magnet HS	Beaumont, TX
F	20	Rayshaun Hammonds	6 ft 8 in (2.03 m)	227 lb (103 kg)	Fr	Norcross HS	Norcross, GA
F	24	Connor O'Neill (W)	6 ft 6 in (1.98 m)	220 lb (100 kg)	Jr	Tilton School	Roswell, GA
F	30	Isaac Kante	6 ft 7 in (2.01 m)	236 lb (107 kg)	Fr	Putnam Science Academy	Brooklyn, NY
F	32	Mike Edwards	6 ft 9 in (2.06 m)	225 lb (102 kg)	Jr	John Glenn HS	Westland, MI
F	33	Nicolas Claxton	6 ft 11 in (2.11 m)	215 lb (98 kg)	Fr	Legacy Charter School	Greenville, SC
F	34	Derek Ogbeide	6 ft 8 in (2.03 m)	245 lb (111 kg)	Jr	Pebblebrook HS	Atlanta, GA

Head coach

- Mark Fox (Eastern New Mexico)

Assistant coach(es)

- Philip Pearson (Alabama)
- Jonas Hayes (Georgia)
- David Carter (Saint Mary's)

Legend

- (C) Team captain
- (S) Suspended
- (I) Ineligible
- (W) Walk-on
- Injured
- Current redshirt

Roster

== Schedule and results ==
Date time, TV	Rank^{#}	Opponent^{#}	Result	Record	High points	High rebounds	High assists	Site (attendance) city, state
Exhibition
Oct 29, 2017; 2:00 pm		vs. Michigan State; Hurricane charity relief exhibition	L 68–80		33 – Maten	7 – Ogbeide	4 – Tied	Van Andel Arena (10,699); Grand Rapids, MI
Nov 2, 2017*; 7:00 pm		Valdosta State	W 112–74		24 – Maten	11 – Hammonds	7 – Jackson II	Stegeman Coliseum (3,752); Athens, GA
Regular season
Nov 10, 2017*; 7:00 pm		Bryant	W 79–54	1–0	21 – Maten	12 – Maten	3 – Wilridge	Stegeman Coliseum (7,387); Athens, GA
Nov 14, 2017*; 7:00 pm, SECN+		USC Upstate	W 74–65	2–0	22 – Maten	14 – Maten	5 – Wilridge	Stegeman Coliseum (5,369); Athens, GA
Nov 19, 2017*; 1:00 pm		Texas A&M–Corpus Christi	W 68–65	3–0	19 – Maten	13 – Maten	4 – Jackson II	Stegeman Coliseum (6,220); Athens, GA
Nov 23, 2017*; 10:30 pm, ESPNews		at Cal State Fullerton; Wooden Legacy quarterfinals	W 64–57	4–0	16 – Jackson II	12 – Hammonds	3 – Tied	Titan Gym (2,192); Fullerton, CA
Nov 24, 2017*; 7:00 pm, ESPN2		vs. San Diego State; Wooden Legacy	L 68–75	4–1	17 – Tied	7 – 3 tied	4 – Jackson II	Titan Gym (3,813); Fullerton, CA
Nov 26, 2017*; 5:00 pm, ESPNU		vs. No. 21 Saint Mary's; Wooden Legacy	W 83–81 ^{OT}	5–1	17 – Crump	9 – Ogbeide	5 – Hammonds	Honda Center (3,193); Anaheim, CA
Dec 2, 2017*; 2:00 pm, CBSSN		at Marquette	W 73–66	6–1	13 – Maten	8 – Hammonds	7 – Jackson II	BMO Harris Bradley Center (14,476); Milwaukee, WI
Dec 5, 2017*; 7:00 pm, SECN		Winthrop	W 87–82	7–1	25 – Maten	11 – Maten	7 – Jackson II	Stegeman Coliseum (6,405); Athens, GA
Dec 16, 2017*; 3:00 pm, NBCSN		at Massachusetts	L 62–72	7–2	20 – Maten	9 – Maten	5 – Jackson II	Mullins Center (4,744); Amherst, MA
Dec 19, 2017*; 9:00 pm, ESPN2		Georgia Tech	W 80–59	8–2	24 – Maten	6 – Maten	4 – Jackson II	Stegeman Coliseum (10,048); Athens, GA
Dec 22, 2017*; 1:00 pm, SECN		Temple	W 84–66	9–2	30 – Maten	12 – Maten	4 – Jackson II	Stegeman Coliseum (10,523); Athens, GA
Dec 31, 2017; 6:00 pm, ESPN		at No. 16 Kentucky	L 61–66	9–3 (0–1)	17 – Maten	12 – Maten	3 – Crump	Rupp Arena (22,862); Lexington, KY
Jan 3, 2018; 6:30 pm, SECN		Ole Miss	W 71–60	10–3 (1–1)	18 – Parker	11 – Parker	5 – Jackson II	Stegeman Coliseum (7,515); Athens, GA
Jan 6, 2018; 12:00 pm, SECN		Alabama	W 65–46	11–3 (2–1)	26 – Maten	11 – Maten	5 – Jackson II	Stegeman Coliseum (10,523); Athens, GA
Jan 10, 2018; 9:00 pm, ESPN2		at Missouri	L 56–68	11–4 (2–2)	10 – Tied	6 – Hammonds	2 – Tied	Mizzou Arena (15,061); Columbia, MO
Jan 13, 2018; 1:00 pm, SECN		South Carolina	L 57–64	11–5 (2–3)	25 – Maten	10 – Ogbeide	2 – Jackson II	Stegeman Coliseum (9,788); Athens, GA
Jan 16, 2018; 7:00 pm, ESPNU		at LSU	W 61–60	12–5 (3–3)	21 – Maten	12 – Maten	5 – Jackson II	Maravich Center (8,269); Baton Rouge, LA
Jan 20, 2018; 6:00 pm, SECN		at No. 17 Auburn	L 65–79	12–6 (3–4)	17 – Maten	9 – Maten	3 – Maten	Auburn Arena (9,121); Auburn, AL
Jan 23, 2018; 6:30 pm, SECN		Arkansas	L 77–80	12–7 (3–5)	26 – Maten	15 – Maten	5 – Jackson II	Stegeman Coliseum (6,405); Athens, GA
Jan 27, 2018*; 2:00 pm, ESPNU		at Kansas State; Big 12/SEC Challenge	L 51–56	12–8	14 – Maten	8 – Ogbeide	4 – Jackson II	Bramlage Coliseum (10,314); Manhattan, KS
Jan 30, 2018; 7:30 pm, SECN		No. 23 Florida	W 72–60	13–8 (4–5)	20 – Maten	8 – Claxton	3 – Parker	Stegeman Coliseum (8,779); Athens, GA
Feb 3, 2018; 6:00 pm, SECN		at Mississippi State	L 57–72	13–9 (4–6)	13 – Tied	7 – Maten	7 – Jackson II	Humphrey Coliseum (7,775); Starkville, MS
Feb 7, 2018; 8:30 pm, SECN		at Vanderbilt	L 66–81	13–10 (4–7)	20 – Maten	6 – Maten	4 – Jackson II	Memorial Gymnasium (8,761); Nashville, TN
Feb 10, 2018; 3:30 pm, SECN		No. 8 Auburn	L 61–78	13–11 (4–8)	20 – Maten	5 – 3 tied	4 – Jackson II	Stegeman Coliseum (10,523); Athens, GA
Feb 14, 2018; 9:00 pm, SECN		at Florida	W 72–69 ^{OT}	14–11 (5–8)	23 – Maten	10 – Tied	5 – Crump	O'Connell Center (9,497); Gainesville, FL
Feb 17, 2018; 6:00 pm, SECN		No. 18 Tennessee	W 73–62	15–11 (6–8)	19 – Maten	11 – Ogbeide	4 – Jackson II	Stegeman Coliseum (10,028); Athens, GA
Feb 21, 2018; 6:30 pm, SECN		at South Carolina	W 66–57	15–12 (6–9)	14 – Jackson II	10 – Maten	3 – Jackson II	Colonial Life Arena (11,529); Columbia, SC
Feb 24, 2018; 2:00 pm, ESPNU		LSU	W 93–82	16–12 (7–9)	27 – Maten	11 – Maten	8 – Jackson II	Stegeman Coliseum (9,518); Athens, GA
Feb 28, 2018; 8:30 pm, SECN		Texas A&M	L 60–61	16–13 (7–10)	16 – Maten	12 – Maten	4 – Hightower	Stegeman Coliseum (6,417); Athens, GA
Mar 3, 2018; 6:00 pm, SECN		at No. 16 Tennessee	L 61–66	16–14 (7–11)	18 – Maten	9 – Maten	8 – Jackson	Thompson–Boling Arena (22,237); Knoxville, TN
SEC Tournament
Mar 7, 2018; 7:00 pm, SECN	(12)	vs. (13) Vanderbilt; First round	W 78–62	17–14	25 – Maten	10 – Ogbeide	6 – Hightower	Scottrade Center (8,190); St. Louis, MO
Mar 8, 2018; 3:30 pm, SECN	(12)	vs. (5) Missouri; Second round	W 62–60	18–14	21 – Maten	10 – Maten	3 – Crump	Scottrade Center (15,129); St. Louis, MO
Mar 9, 2018; 3:30 pm, ESPN	(12)	vs. (4) Kentucky; Quarterfinals	L 49–62	18–15	17 – Crump	11 – Ogbeide	1 – Tied	Scottrade Center (16,364); St. Louis, MO
*Non-conference game. ^{#}Rankings from AP Poll. (#) Tournament seedings in parentheses. All times are in Eastern Time.
