= 2017–18 Kentucky Wildcats men's basketball team =

2017–18 season of University of Kentucky men's basketball team

2017–18 Kentucky Wildcats men's basketball

SEC tournament champions

NCAA tournament, Sweet Sixteen
- Conference: Southeastern Conference

Ranking
- Coaches: No. 17
- AP: No. 18
- Record: 26–11 (10–8 SEC)
- Head coach: John Calipari (9th season)
- Assistant coaches: Kenny Payne (8th season); Tony Barbee (4th season); Joel Justus (2nd season)
- Home arena: Rupp Arena

2017–18 Southeastern Conference men's basketball standings
	Conf.				Overall
Team	W		L	PCT	W		L	PCT
No. 19 Auburn	13	–	5	.722	26	–	8	.765
No. 13 Tennessee	13	–	5	.722	26	–	9	.743
No. 23 Florida	11	–	7	.611	21	–	13	.618
No. 18 Kentucky †	10	–	8	.556	26	–	11	.703
Missouri	10	–	8	.556	20	–	13	.606
Arkansas	10	–	8	.556	23	–	12	.657
Mississippi State	9	–	9	.500	25	–	12	.676
Texas A&M	9	–	9	.500	22	–	13	.629
Alabama	8	–	10	.444	20	–	16	.556
LSU	8	–	10	.444	18	–	15	.545
Georgia	7	–	11	.389	18	–	15	.545
South Carolina	7	–	11	.389	17	–	16	.515
Vanderbilt	6	–	12	.333	12	–	20	.375
Ole Miss	5	–	13	.278	12	–	20	.375
† 2018 SEC tournament winner Rankings from AP poll

The 2017–18 Kentucky Wildcats men's basketball team represented the University of Kentucky in the 2017–18 NCAA Division I men's basketball season. The team played its home games in Lexington, Kentucky for the 42nd consecutive season at Rupp Arena, with a capacity of 20,500. The team, led by John Calipari in his ninth season as head coach, was a member of the Southeastern Conference.

On January 22, 2018, following losses to South Carolina on the road, and to Florida at home, the Wildcats fell out of the AP rankings for the first time since March 2014.

They finished the season 26–11, 10–8 in SEC play to finish in three-way tie for fourth place. They defeated Georgia, Alabama, and Tennessee to become champions of the SEC tournament. They earned the SEC's automatic bid to the NCAA tournament, where they defeated Davidson and Buffalo to advance to the Sweet Sixteen where they lost to Kansas State.

== Previous season ==
The Wildcats finished the 2016–17 season 32–6, 16–2 in SEC play to win the regular season SEC championship. In the SEC tournament the Wildcats beat Georgia, Alabama, and Arkansas to win the tournament championship. As a result, the Wildcats received the conference's automatic bid to the NCAA tournament. As a No. 2 seed in the South region, they defeated No. 15 Northern Kentucky and No. 10 Wichita State to advance to the Sweet 16. There, they defeated No. 3 UCLA to advance to the Elite Eight where they lost to eventual National Champion, No. 1 North Carolina.

== Offseason ==
=== Summary ===
On April 3, 2017, De'Aaron Fox announced that he was leaving the program to enter the 2017 NBA draft, and would forgo his remaining eligibility. On April 4, 2017, Malik Monk, in a release to the fanbase, stated that he intended to enter the NBA draft and sign with an agent, thus ending his remaining eligibility with the program. On April 6, 2017, Isaiah Briscoe announced that he was leaving Kentucky to enter the 2017 NBA Draft, and would sign with an agent, forgoing his remaining eligibility. On April 12, 2017, Isaac Humphries announced that he was leaving Kentucky to pursue a professional career in basketball and will sign with an agent, and would forgo remaining eligibility. On April 24, 2017, Bam Adebayo stated that he intended to sign with an agent, thus ending his remaining eligibility with the program. On May 24, 2017, the final day on which players who wished to return to college basketball could withdraw from the NBA draft, Hamidou Diallo, who entered the draft without hiring an agent, announced that he would return to Kentucky to play in 2017–18.

=== Departures ===
Name	Number	Pos.	Height	Weight	Year	Hometown	Reason left
De'Aaron Fox	0	Guard	6'3"	187	Freshman	Katy, Texas	Declared for 2017 NBA draft
Bam Adebayo	3	Forward	6'10"	260	Freshman	Washington, North Carolina	Declared for 2017 NBA draft
Malik Monk	5	Guard	6'3"	200	Freshman	Lepanto, Arkansas	Declared for 2017 NBA draft
Mychal Mulder	11	Guard	6'4"	185	Senior	Windsor, Ontario	Graduated
Isaiah Briscoe	13	Guard	6'3"	210	Sophomore	Newark, New Jersey	Declared for 2017 NBA draft
Isaac Humphries	15	Center	7'0"	255	Sophomore	Sydney, Australia	Declared for 2017 NBA draft
Dominique Hawkins	25	Guard	6'0"	191	Senior	Richmond, Kentucky	Graduated
Derek Willis	35	Forward	6'9"	228	Senior	Mount Washington, Kentucky	Graduated

=== 2017–18 newcomers ===
Nick Richards, a native of Kingston, Jamaica who moved to Queens, New York in 2013, was the first commitment in the Kentucky class. He committed to Kentucky on November 10 at a press conference at his high school. He chose Kentucky over Arizona and Syracuse. He was a consensus five star prospect, and was ranked the consensus No. 14 overall player by the four main recruiting services.

P. J. Washington, a Dallas native attending school in Las Vegas, Nevada, was the second commitment in the Kentucky class. He committed to Kentucky on November 10 live on ESPNU. He chose Kentucky over North Carolina and UNLV. He was a consensus five star prospect, and was ranked the consensus No. 15 overall player by the four main recruiting services.

Shai Gilgeous-Alexander, originally from Hamilton, Ontario and attending school in Chattanooga, Tennessee, was the third commitment in the Kentucky class. He committed to Kentucky on November 14 through a message on Twitter. He was a consensus top fifty player, ranked No. 42 by the four main recruiting services Rivals, ESPN, Scout, and 24/7 Sports.

Quade Green, from Philadelphia, Pennsylvania, was the fourth commitment in the Kentucky class. He signed his National Letter of Intent on November 16, the last day of the early signing period, but did not reveal his choice between Kentucky and Syracuse until an event at his high school on November 19 - with his mother Tamika Johnson by his side. He was a consensus top-25 player and ranked as a five-star player by the four main recruiting services Rivals, ESPN, Scout, and 24/7 Sports.

Hamidou Diallo, a Queens native who graduated from a Connecticut school in spring 2016, announced on January 7, 2017, that he would enroll at UK for the start of the school's spring semester the following week. While he was eligible to play immediately, he redshirted the spring semester and began play as a freshman in 2017–18.

Jemarl Baker, a native of Eastvale, California, was the seventh commitment in the Kentucky recruiting class. He announced his decision on April 11 via a story posted on Scout.com by Evan Daniels. Baker originally committed to Cuonzo Martin at California, before Martin left the school to coach Missouri. He averaged 17.1 points, 4.1 assists, 3.5 rebounds and 1.8 steals for Roosevelt High School in Corona, Calif., and he quickly emerged as one of the Wildcats' top backcourt targets after their season ended last month. Scout.com ranks Baker as the No. 86 overall prospect in the 2017 class.

UK's final commitment came on May 6, when Tampa product Kevin Knox II announced he would come to the school. Kentucky beat out Duke, Florida State, North Carolina, and Missouri for Knox's signature.

Kentucky recruits at the 2017 McDonald's All-American Boys Game

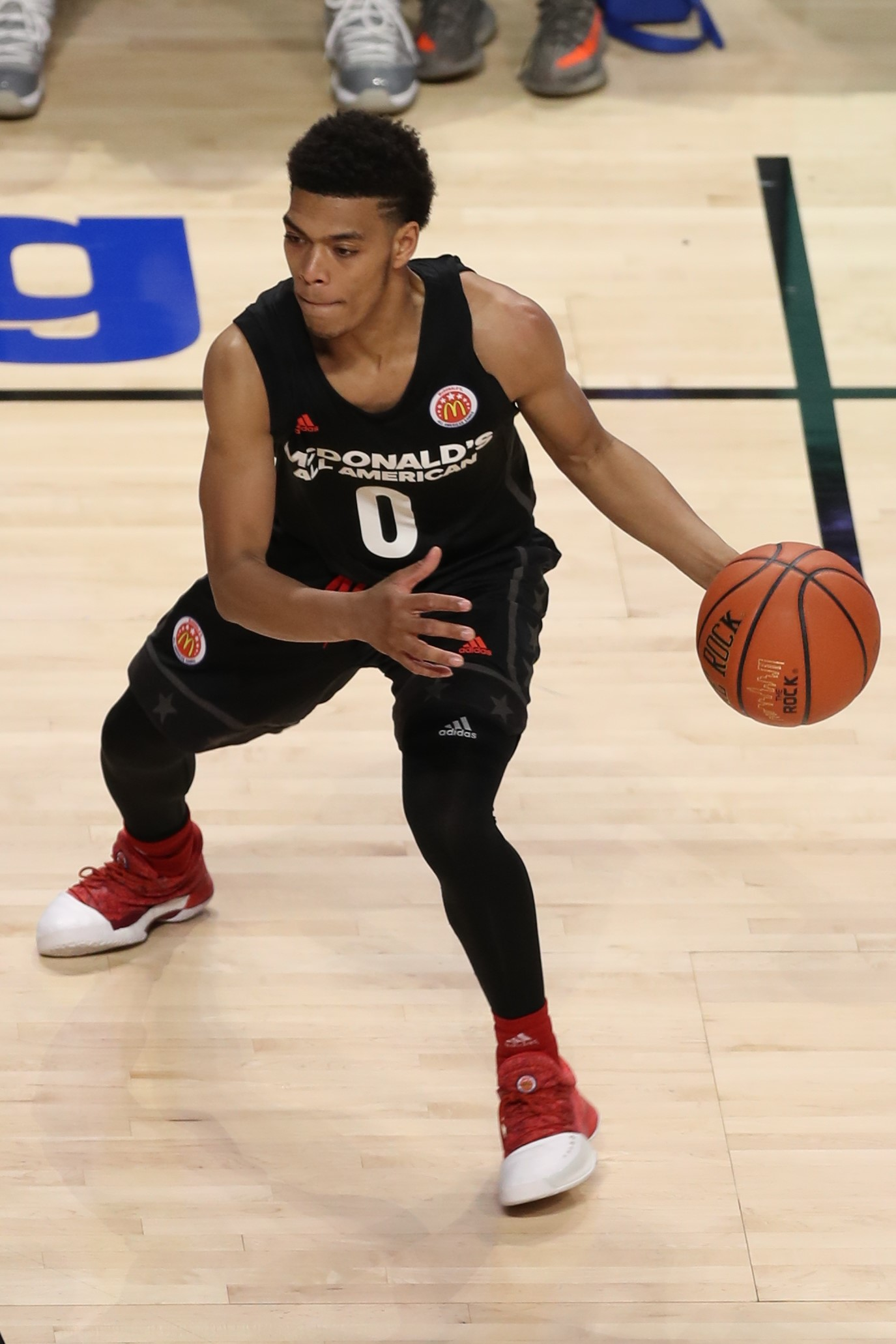
Quade Green

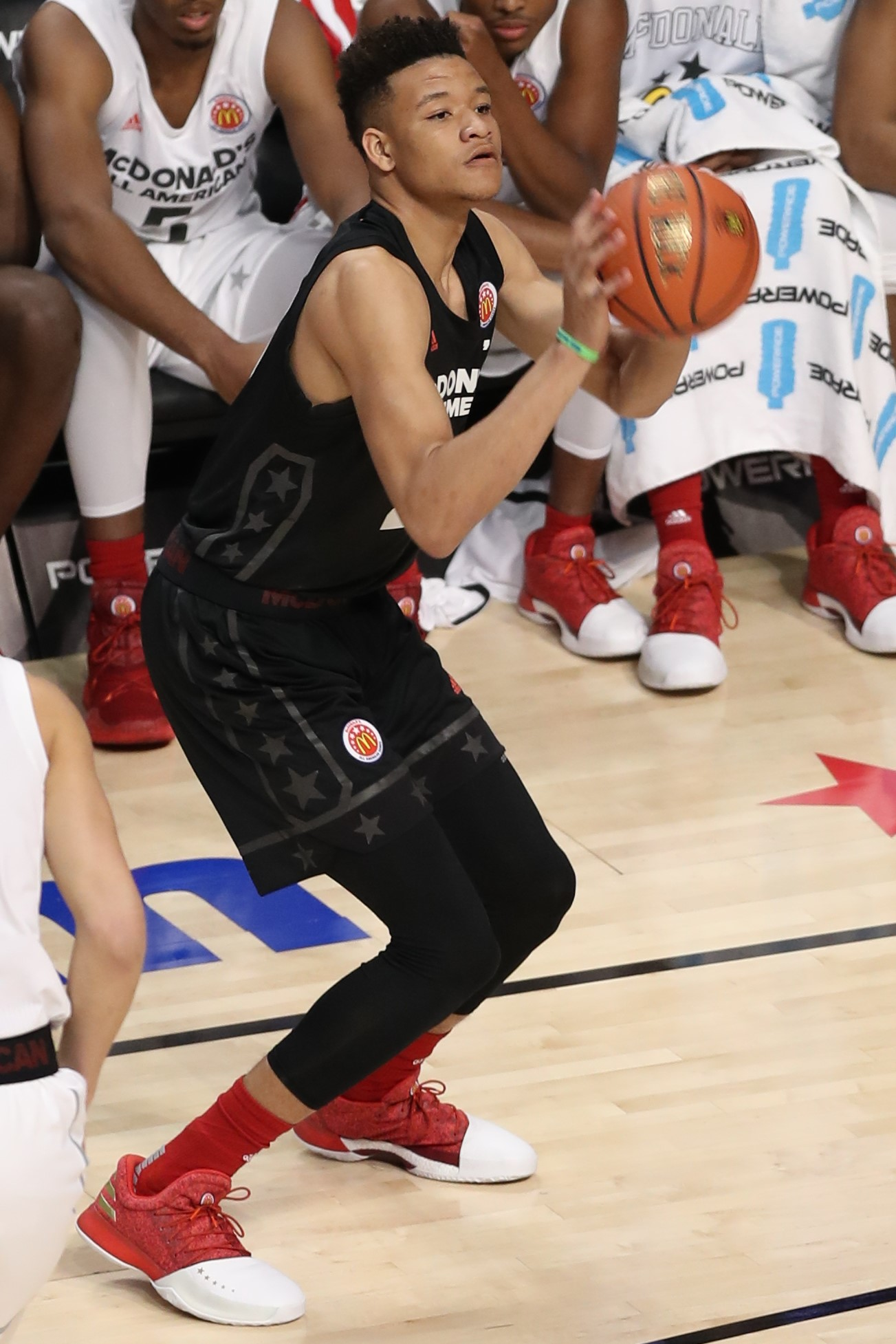
Kevin Knox II

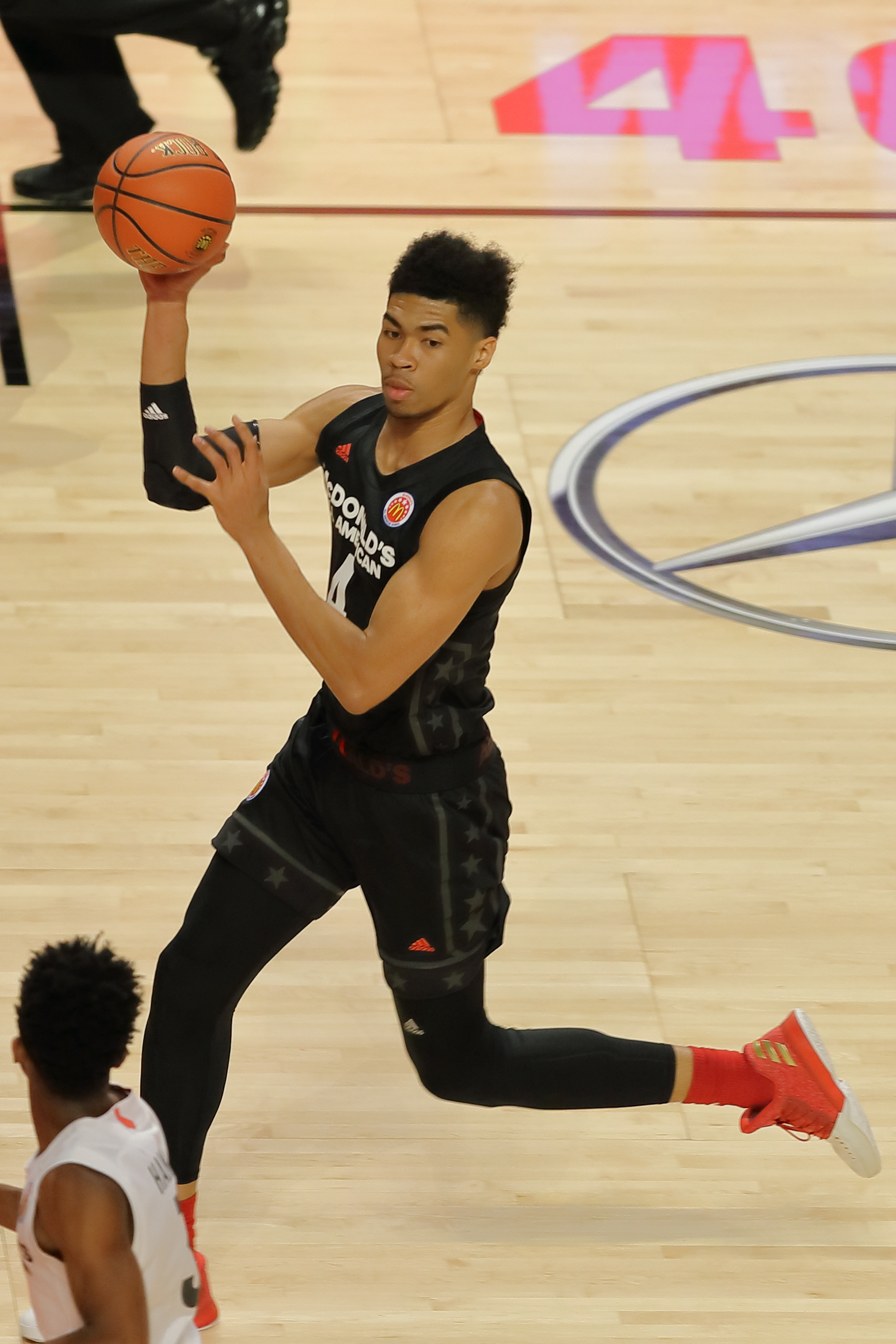
Nick Richards

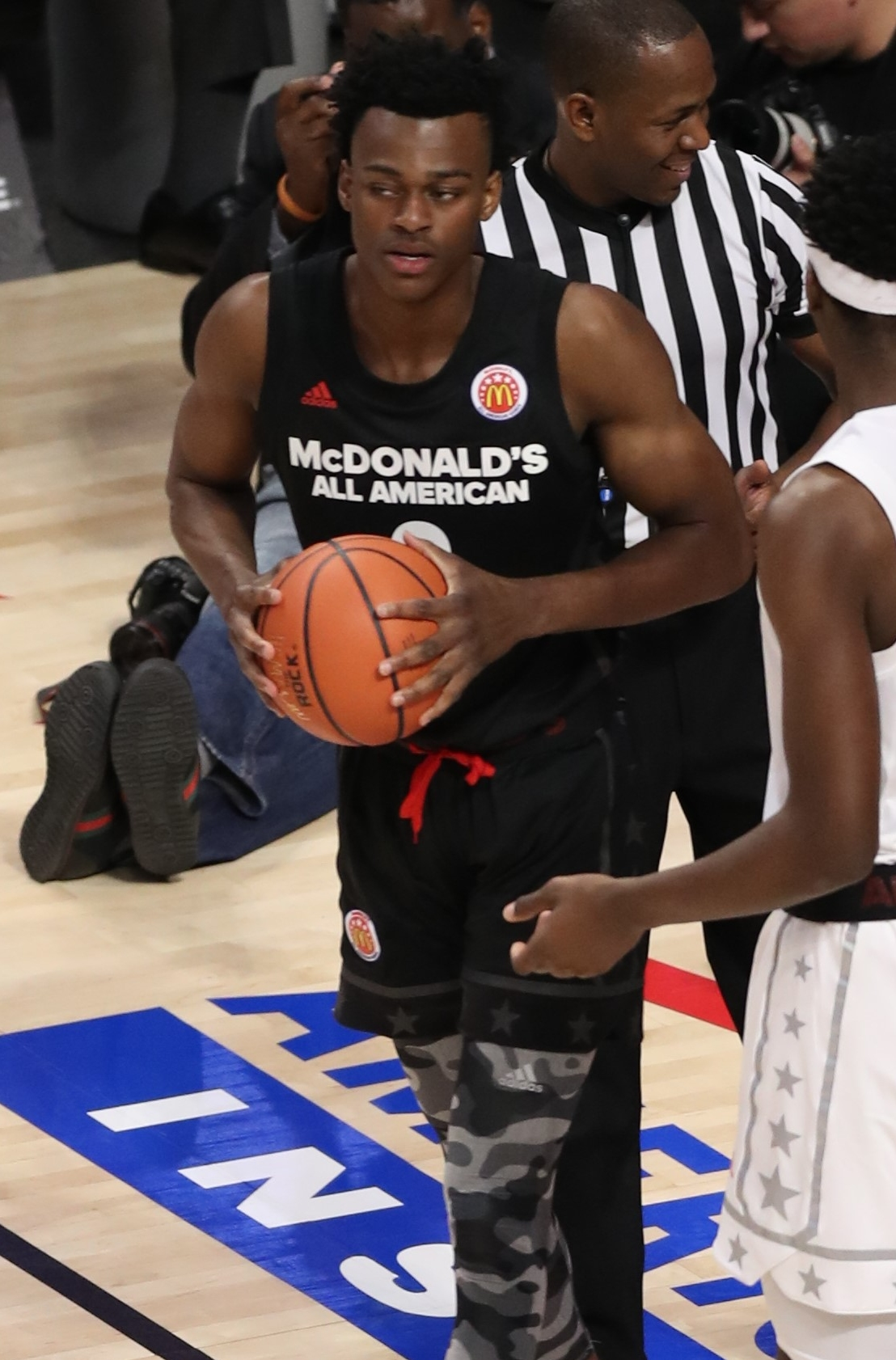
Jarred Vanderbilt

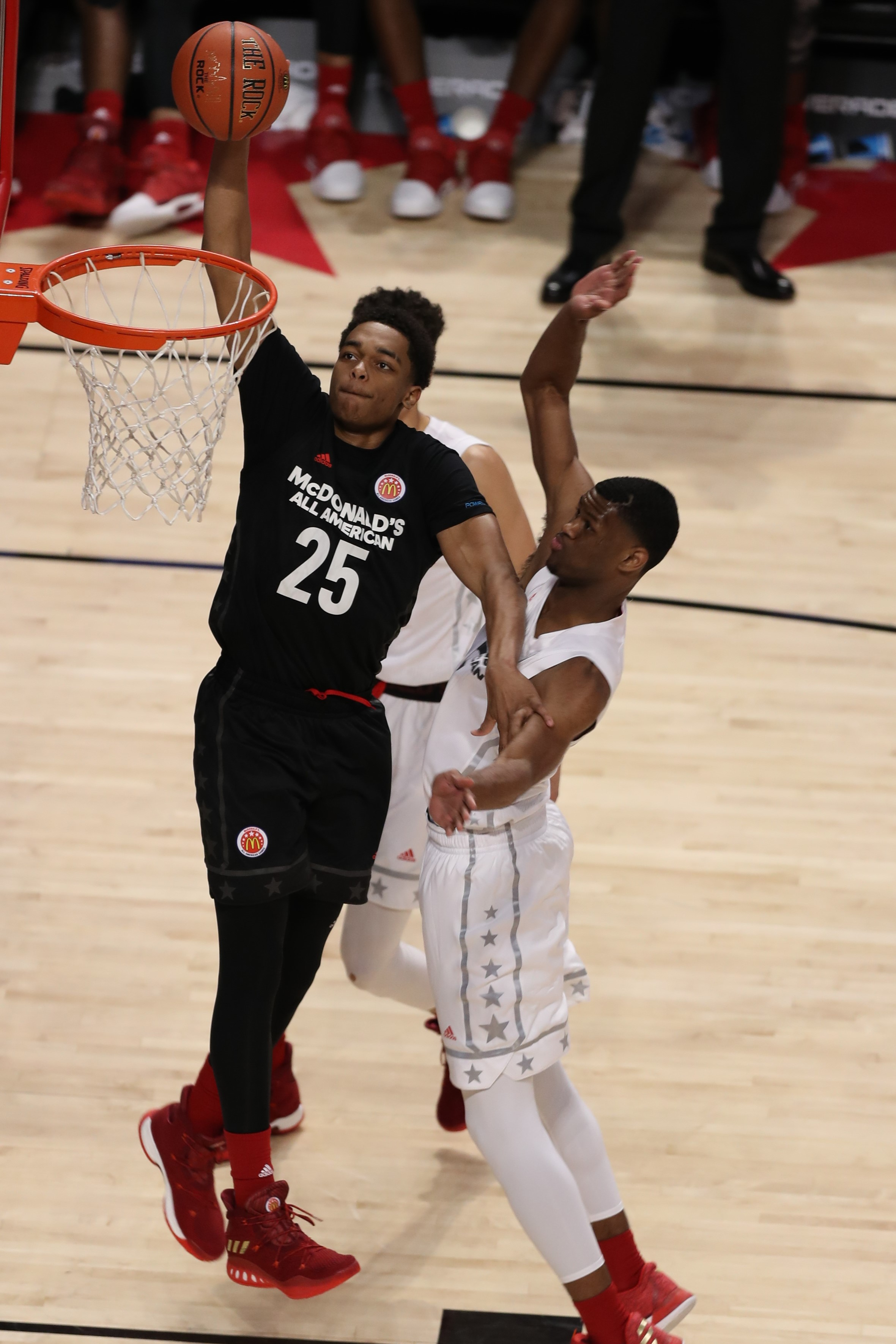
P. J. Washington

College recruiting information
Name	Hometown	School	Height	Weight	Commit date
Shai Gilgeous-Alexander; G	Hamilton, Ontario	Hamilton Heights Christian (TN)	6 ft 4 in (1.93 m)	160 lb (73 kg)	Nov 14, 2016
Shai Gilgeous-Alexander; G	Recruit ratings: Scout: Rivals: 247Sports: ESPN:				
Jemarl Baker; SG	Eastvale, California	Roosevelt High School	6 ft 4 in (1.93 m)	180 lb (82 kg)	Apr 11, 2017
Jemarl Baker; SG	Recruit ratings: Scout: Rivals: 247Sports: ESPN:				
Hamidou Diallo; SG	Queens, New York	Putnam Science Academy	6 ft 5 in (1.96 m)	195 lb (88 kg)	Jan 7, 2017
Hamidou Diallo; SG	Recruit ratings: Scout: Rivals: 247Sports: ESPN:				
Quade Green; PG	Philadelphia, Pennsylvania	Neumann–Goretti	6 ft 1 in (1.85 m)	170 lb (77 kg)	Nov 16, 2016
Quade Green; PG	Recruit ratings: Scout: Rivals: 247Sports: ESPN:				
Kevin Knox II; SF	Tampa, Florida	Tampa Catholic High School	6 ft 8 in (2.03 m)	205 lb (93 kg)	May 6, 2017
Kevin Knox II; SF	Recruit ratings: Scout: Rivals: 247Sports: ESPN:				
Nick Richards; C	Kingston, Jamaica	St. Patrick	6 ft 11 in (2.11 m)	250 lb (110 kg)	Nov 10, 2016
Nick Richards; C	Recruit ratings: Scout: Rivals: 247Sports: ESPN:				
P. J. Washington; PF	Dallas, Texas	Findlay Prep	6 ft 8 in (2.03 m)	225 lb (102 kg)	Nov 10, 2016
P. J. Washington; PF	Recruit ratings: Scout: Rivals: 247Sports: ESPN:				
Jarred Vanderbilt; SF	Houston, Texas	Victory Prep	6 ft 8 in (2.03 m)	215 lb (98 kg)	Dec 23, 2016
Jarred Vanderbilt; SF	Recruit ratings: Scout: Rivals: 247Sports: ESPN:				
Overall recruit ranking: Scout: No. 2 Rivals: No. 2 247Sports: No. 2 ESPN: No. 2
Note: In many cases, Scout, Rivals, 247Sports, On3, and ESPN may conflict in their listings of height and weight.; In these cases, the average was taken. ESPN grades are on a 100-point scale.; Sources: "Kentucky 2017 Basketball Commitments". Rivals.; "2017 Kentucky Basketball Commits". Scout.; "2017 Kentucky Basketball Commits". ESPN.; "Scout.com Team Recruiting Rankings". Scout.; "2017 Team Ranking". Rivals.

=== 2018–19 newcomers ===
Immanuel Quickley, from Havre de Grace, Maryland, was the first commitment in the Kentucky's 2018 class. He committed to Kentucky on September 22, over offers from Kansas and Miami. He was a consensus five-star prospect, and was ranked the consensus No. 12 overall player by the four main recruiting services.

The Wildcats' second 2018 commitment was Keldon Johnson, a small forward from South Hill, Virginia, who committed on November 11. Kentucky beat out Maryland, NC State, and Texas for Johnson's signature. He was also a consensus five-star prospect, and ranked by ESPN as its No. 7 overall prospect.

Tyler Herro was the third commitment for Kentucky's 2018 class. Formerly committed to Wisconsin, Herro committed to Kentucky the week after his official visit. Herro was a consensus four-star prospect and was ranked the No. 4 shooting guard in the 2018 class by ESPN.

E.J. Montgomery was the fourth commitment for Kentucky's 2018 class. Former committed to Auburn, he re-opened his recruitment after the Auburn staff was implicated in the 2017–18 NCAA Division I men's basketball corruption scandal. Montgomery committed to Kentucky on April 9, 2018. Montgomery was a five-star prospect and was ranked No. 12 in the 2018 class.

College recruiting information
Name	Hometown	School	Height	Weight	Commit date
Immanuel Quickley; PG	Havre de Grace, MD	John Carroll School	6 ft 3 in (1.91 m)	180 lb (82 kg)	Sep 22, 2017
Immanuel Quickley; PG	Recruit ratings: Scout: Rivals: 247Sports: ESPN: (90)				
Keldon Johnson; SF	South Hill, VA	Oak Hill Academy	6 ft 6 in (1.98 m)	210 lb (95 kg)	Nov 11, 2017
Keldon Johnson; SF	Recruit ratings: Scout: Rivals: 247Sports: ESPN: (94)				
Tyler Herro; SG	Milwaukee, WI	Whitnall High School	6 ft 5 in (1.96 m)	195 lb (88 kg)	Nov 14, 2017
Tyler Herro; SG	Recruit ratings: Scout: Rivals: 247Sports: ESPN: (89)				
E. J. Montgomery; PF	Marietta, GA	Joseph Wheeler High School	6 ft 10 in (2.08 m)	200 lb (91 kg)	Apr 9, 2018
E. J. Montgomery; PF	Recruit ratings: Scout: Rivals: 247Sports: ESPN: (92)				
Overall recruit ranking: Scout: No. 2 Rivals: No. 2 247Sports: No. 2 ESPN: No. 2
Note: In many cases, Scout, Rivals, 247Sports, On3, and ESPN may conflict in their listings of height and weight.; In these cases, the average was taken. ESPN grades are on a 100-point scale.; Sources: "Kentucky 2018 Basketball Commitments". Rivals.; "2018 Kentucky Basketball Commits". Scout.; "2018 Kentucky Basketball Commits". ESPN.; "Scout.com Team Recruiting Rankings". Scout.; "2018 Team Ranking". Rivals.

== Roster ==
2017–18 Kentucky Wildcats men's basketball team
Players
Coaches

Pos.	#	Name	Height	Weight	Year	Previous school	Hometown
G	0	Quade Green	6 ft 0 in (1.83 m)	180 lb (82 kg)	Fr	Neumann–Goretti	Philadelphia, Pennsylvania
F	1	Sacha Killeya-Jones	6 ft 10 in (2.08 m)	221 lb (100 kg)	So	Virginia Episcopal	Chapel Hill, North Carolina
F	2	Jarred Vanderbilt	6 ft 9 in (2.06 m)	214 lb (97 kg)	Fr	Victory Prep	Houston, Texas
G	3	Hamidou Diallo	6 ft 5 in (1.96 m)	198 lb (90 kg)	RS Fr	Putnam Science Academy	Queens, New York
C	4	Nick Richards	6 ft 11 in (2.11 m)	240 lb (109 kg)	Fr	St. Patrick (NJ)	Kingston, Jamaica
SF	5	Kevin Knox II	6 ft 9 in (2.06 m)	215 lb (98 kg)	Fr	Tampa Catholic	Tampa, Florida
G	10	Jonny David (W)	6 ft 2 in (1.88 m)	183 lb (83 kg)	Jr	Mt. Lebanon	Pittsburgh, Pennsylvania
G	12	Brad Calipari (W)	6 ft 0 in (1.83 m)	176 lb (80 kg)	So	MacDuffie	Franklin Lakes, New Jersey
G	13	Jemarl Baker (injured)	6 ft 4 in (1.93 m)	182 lb (83 kg)	Fr	Eleanor Roosevelt	Eastvale, California
F	14	Tai Wynyard (S)	6 ft 10 in (2.08 m)	250 lb (113 kg)	So	Rangitoto	Auckland, New Zealand
G	22	Shai Gilgeous-Alexander	6 ft 6 in (1.98 m)	180 lb (82 kg)	Fr	Hamilton Heights Christian (TN)	Hamilton, Ontario
F	25	P. J. Washington	6 ft 7 in (2.01 m)	236 lb (107 kg)	Fr	Findlay Prep	Dallas, Texas
G	30	Dillon Pulliam (W)	6 ft 3 in (1.91 m)	195 lb (88 kg)	RS Jr	Transylvania	Cynthiana, Kentucky
F	32	Wenyen Gabriel	6 ft 9 in (2.06 m)	205 lb (93 kg)	So	Wilbraham & Monson	Manchester, New Hampshire

Head coach

- John Calipari (Clarion)

Assistant coach(es)

- Kenny Payne (Louisville)
- Tony Barbee (UMass)
- Joel Justus (UNC Wilmington)
- John Robic (Denison)

Legend

- (C) Team captain
- (S) Suspended
- (I) Ineligible
- (W) Walk-on
- Injured
- Current redshirt

Roster

- Roster is subject to change as/if players transfer or leave the program for other reasons.

=== Depth chart ===
Pos.	Starting 5	Bench 1	Bench 2
C	Nick Richards	Sacha Killeya-Jones	Tai Wynyard
PF	P. J. Washington	Wenyen Gabriel
SF	Kevin Knox II	Jarred Vanderbilt	Dillon Pulliam
SG	Hamidou Diallo		Johnny David
PG	Shai Gilgeous-Alexander	Quade Green	Brad Calipari

== Schedule and results ==
On June 6, 2017, Kentucky released the non-conference portion of its schedule. The schedule is highlighted by marquee match-ups at Rupp Arena and across the country. Kentucky traveled to Chicago to play Kansas in the annual Champions Classic, to New York to play Monmouth, to New Orleans to play against UCLA in the annual CBS Sports Classic, and finally to face in-state rival Louisville in Lexington. Kentucky also hosted Virginia Tech and traveled to play West Virginia in the Big 12/SEC Challenge.

Big Blue Madness took place on October 13. The event was the debut of the team for the 2017–18 season. The annual Blue-White game took place on October 20, 2017.

Date time, TV	Rank^{#}	Opponent^{#}	Result	Record	High points	High rebounds	High assists	Site (attendance) city, state
Exhibition
October 27, 2017*; 7:00 pm, SECN		Thomas More	W 103–61	–	27 – Knox	10 – Tied	7 – Green	Rupp Arena (19,736); Lexington, KY
October 30, 2017*; 7:00 pm		Morehead State; Kentucky Cares Classic	W 92–67	–	23 – Diallo	6 – Gabriel	5 – Green	Rupp Arena (14,138); Lexington, KY
November 3, 2017*; 7:00 pm, SECN	No. 5	Centre	W 106–63	–	20 – Gabriel	11 – Knox	5 – Green	Rupp Arena (20,378); Lexington, KY
Regular Season
November 10, 2017*; 7:00 pm, SECN	No. 5	Utah Valley	W 73–63	1–0	18 – Diallo	12 – Gabriel	5 – Gilgeous-Alexander	Rupp Arena (19,807); Lexington, KY
November 12, 2017*; 3:30 pm, ESPN	No. 5	Vermont	W 73–69	2–0	17 – Washington	10 – Washington	4 – Green	Rupp Arena (20,174); Lexington, KY
November 14, 2017*; 9:30 pm, ESPN	No. 7	vs. No. 4 Kansas; Champions Classic	L 61–65	2–1	20 – Knox	9 – Tied	4 – Diallo	United Center (21,684); Chicago, IL
November 17, 2017*; 7:00 pm, SECN	No. 7	East Tennessee State; Adolph Rupp Classic	W 78–61	3–1	21 – Green	10 – Knox	6 – Gilgeous-Alexander	Rupp Arena (20,168); Lexington, KY
November 20, 2017*; 8:00 pm, SECN	No. 8	Troy; Adolph Rupp Classic	W 70–62	4–1	17 – Knox	10 – Diallo	4 – Washington	Rupp Arena (19,548); Lexington, KY
November 22, 2017*; 8:00 pm, SECN	No. 8	Fort Wayne; Adolph Rupp Classic	W 86–67	5–1	25 – Richards	15 – Richards	5 – Green	Rupp Arena (20,645); Lexington, KY
November 26, 2017*; 6:00 pm, SECN	No. 8	UIC; Adolph Rupp Classic	W 107–73	6–1	25 – Knox	6 – Green	4 – Tied	Rupp Arena (20,212); Lexington, KY
December 2, 2017*; 3:30 pm, ESPN	No. 7	Harvard	W 79–70	7–1	20 – Knox	7 – Tied	5 – Green	Rupp Arena (22,922); Lexington, KY
December 9, 2017*; 12:00 pm, ESPNU	No. 8	vs. Monmouth; Citi Double Cash Classic	W 93–76	8–1	23 – Diallo	8 – Richards	9 – Gilgeous-Alexander	Madison Square Garden (10,438); New York, NY
December 16, 2017*; 2:00 pm, ESPN2	No. 8	Virginia Tech	W 93–86	9–1	21 – Knox	9 – Gabriel	5 – Tied	Rupp Arena (22,690); Lexington, KY
December 23, 2017*; 4:00 pm, CBS	No. 7	vs. UCLA; CBS Sports Classic	L 75–83	9–2	18 – Diallo	6 – Tied	5 – Gilgeous-Alexander	Smoothie King Center (8,119); New Orleans, LA
December 29, 2017*; 1:00 pm, CBS	No. 16	Louisville; The Battle for the Bluegrass	W 90–61	10–2	24 – Gilgeous-Alexander	7 – Tied	5 – Green	Rupp Arena (24,228); Lexington, KY
December 31, 2017; 6:00 pm, ESPN	No. 16	Georgia	W 66–61	11–2 (1–0)	21 – Gilgeous-Alexander	11 – Gabriel	4 – Gilgeous-Alexander	Rupp Arena (22,862); Lexington, KY
January 3, 2018; 8:30 pm, SECN	No. 17	at LSU	W 74–71	12–2 (2–0)	18 – Tied	11 – Knox	4 – Gilgeous-Alexander	Pete Maravich Assembly Center (11,952); Baton Rouge, LA
January 6, 2018; 9:00 pm, SECN	No. 17	at No. 23 Tennessee; Rivalry	L 65–76	12–3 (2–1)	14 – Green	8 – Richards	6 – Gilgeous-Alexander	Thompson-Boling Arena (21,678); Knoxville, TN
January 9, 2018; 7:00 pm, ESPN	No. 21	Texas A&M	W 74–73	13–3 (3–1)	18 – Diallo	7 – Gilgeous-Alexander	5 – Gilgeous-Alexander	Rupp Arena (22,643); Lexington, KY
January 13, 2018; 4:00 pm, ESPN	No. 21	at Vanderbilt	W 74–67	14–3 (4–1)	22 – Gilgeous-Alexander	9 – Gabriel	6 – Gilgeous-Alexander	Memorial Gymnasium (13,389); Nashville, TN
January 16, 2018; 9:00 pm, ESPN	No. 18	at South Carolina	L 68–76	14–4 (4–2)	21 – Knox	8 – Knox	3 – Vanderbilt	Colonial Life Arena (16,200); Columbia, SC
January 20, 2018; 8:15 pm, ESPN	No. 18	Florida; Rivalry/College GameDay	L 64–66	14–5 (4–3)	10 – Tied	9 – Richards	6 – Gilgeous-Alexander	Rupp Arena (24,394); Lexington, KY
January 23, 2018; 9:00 pm, ESPN		Mississippi State	W 78–65	15–5 (5–3)	22 – Washington	7 – Tied	6 – Gilgeous-Alexander	Rupp Arena (20,609); Lexington, KY
January 27, 2018*; 7:00 pm, ESPN		at No. 7 West Virginia; Big 12/SEC Challenge/College GameDay	W 83–76	16–5	34 – Knox	11 – Vanderbilt	5 – Gilgeous-Alexander	WVU Coliseum (15,835); Morgantown, WV
January 30, 2018; 9:00 pm, ESPN	No. 21	Vanderbilt	W 83–81 ^{OT}	17–5 (6–3)	30 – Gilgeous-Alexander	8 – Knox	3 – Gilgeous-Alexander	Rupp Arena (21,143); Lexington, KY
February 3, 2018; 2:00 pm, CBS	No. 21	at Missouri	L 60–69	17–6 (6–4)	15 – Gilgeous-Alexander	10 – Vanderbilt	6 – Gilgeous-Alexander	Mizzou Arena (15,061); Columbia, MO
February 6, 2018; 7:00 pm, ESPN	No. 24	No. 15 Tennessee; Rivalry	L 59–61	17–7 (6–5)	15 – Tied	8 – Richards	6 – Gilgeous-Alexander	Rupp Arena (23,332); Lexington, KY
February 10, 2018; 8:15 pm, ESPN	No. 24	at Texas A&M	L 74–85	17–8 (6–6)	19 – Gilgeous-Alexander	8 – Washington	8 – Gilgeous-Alexander	Reed Arena (13,263); College Station, TX
February 14, 2018; 9:00 pm, ESPN2		at No. 10 Auburn	L 66–76	17–9 (6–7)	19 – Knox	10 – Vanderbilt	3 – Vanderbilt	Auburn Arena (9,121); Auburn, AL
February 17, 2018; 2:00 pm, CBS		Alabama	W 81–71	18–9 (7–7)	16 – Washington	9 – Vanderbilt	4 – Tied	Rupp Arena (23,220); Lexington, KY
February 20, 2018; 9:00 pm, ESPN		at Arkansas	W 87–72	19–9 (8–7)	23 – Knox	10 – Washington	7 – Gilgeous-Alexander	Bud Walton Arena (18,083); Fayetteville, AR
February 24, 2018; 8:15 pm, ESPN		Missouri	W 87–66	20–9 (9–7)	21 – Knox	15 – Vanderbilt	8 – Gilgeous-Alexander	Rupp Arena (23,038); Lexington, KY
February 28, 2018; 7:00 pm, ESPN2	No. 23	Ole Miss	W 96–78	21–9 (10–7)	22 – Knox	11 – Vanderbilt	10 – Gilgeous-Alexander	Rupp Arena (22,108); Lexington, KY
March 3, 2018; 12:00 pm, CBS	No. 23	at Florida; Rivalry	L 67–80	21–10 (10–8)	17 – Gilgeous-Alexander	7 – Washington	4 – Gilgeous-Alexander	O'Connell Center (10,558); Gainesville, FL
SEC Tournament
March 9, 2018; 3:30 pm, ESPN	(4)	vs. (12) Georgia; Quarterfinals	W 62–49	22–10	18 – Washington	9 – Knox	9 – Gilgeous-Alexander	Scottrade Center (16,364); St. Louis, MO
March 10, 2018; 1:00 pm, ESPN	(4)	vs. (9) Alabama; Semifinals	W 86–63	23–10	23 – Gabriel	8 – Washington	8 – Gilgeous-Alexander	Scottrade Center (18,729); St. Louis, MO
March 11, 2018; 1:00 pm, ESPN	(4)	vs. (2) No. 13 Tennessee; Championship	W 77–72	24–10	29 – Gilgeous-Alexander	7 – Knox	3 – Tied	Scottrade Center (18,973); St. Louis, MO
NCAA tournament
March 15, 2018*; 7:10 pm, CBS	(5 S) No. 18	vs. (12 S) Davidson; First Round	W 78–73	25–10	25 – Knox	8 – Gilgeous-Alexander	7 – Gilgeous-Alexander	Taco Bell Arena (11,673); Boise, ID
March 17, 2018*; 5:15 pm, CBS	(5 S) No. 18	vs. (13 S) Buffalo; Second Round	W 95–75	26–10	27 – Gilgeous-Alexander	11 – Gabriel	6 – Gilgeous-Alexander	Taco Bell Arena (11,686); Boise, ID
March 22, 2018*; 9:37 pm, CBS	(5 S) No. 18	vs. (9 S) Kansas State; Sweet Sixteen	L 58–61	26–11	18 – Washington	15 – Washington	5 – Gilgeous-Alexander	Philips Arena (15,616); Atlanta, GA
*Non-conference game. ^{#}Rankings from AP Poll. (#) Tournament seedings in parentheses. S=South. All times are in Eastern Time.

== Rankings ==
Ranking movements Legend: ██ Increase in ranking ██ Decrease in ranking RV = Received votes
	Week																			
Poll	Pre	1	2	3	4	5	6	7	8	9	10	11	12	13	14	15	16	17	18	Final
AP	5	7	8	7	8	8	7	16	17	21	18	RV	21	24	RV	RV	24	RV	18	Not released
Coaches	4	8	8	7	7	5	6	16	14	20	16	RV	22	24	RV	RV	25	RV	20	17

*AP does not release post-NCAA Tournament rankings
