= 2017–18 Vanderbilt Commodores men's basketball team =

American college basketball season

2017–18 Vanderbilt Commodores men's basketball
- Conference: Southeastern Conference
- Record: 12–20 (6–12 SEC)
- Head coach: Bryce Drew (2nd season)
- Assistant coaches: Roger Powell, Jr.; Jake Diebler; Casey Shaw
- Home arena: Memorial Gymnasium

2017–18 Southeastern Conference men's basketball standings
	Conf.				Overall
Team	W		L	PCT	W		L	PCT
No. 19 Auburn	13	–	5	.722	26	–	8	.765
No. 13 Tennessee	13	–	5	.722	26	–	9	.743
No. 23 Florida	11	–	7	.611	21	–	13	.618
No. 18 Kentucky †	10	–	8	.556	26	–	11	.703
Missouri	10	–	8	.556	20	–	13	.606
Arkansas	10	–	8	.556	23	–	12	.657
Mississippi State	9	–	9	.500	25	–	12	.676
Texas A&M	9	–	9	.500	22	–	13	.629
Alabama	8	–	10	.444	20	–	16	.556
LSU	8	–	10	.444	18	–	15	.545
Georgia	7	–	11	.389	18	–	15	.545
South Carolina	7	–	11	.389	17	–	16	.515
Vanderbilt	6	–	12	.333	12	–	20	.375
Ole Miss	5	–	13	.278	12	–	20	.375
† 2018 SEC tournament winner Rankings from AP poll

The 2017–18 Vanderbilt Commodores men's basketball team represented Vanderbilt University in the 2017–18 NCAA Division I men's basketball season. They were coached by Bryce Drew, who was in his second season at Vanderbilt. The Commodores played their home games at Memorial Gymnasium in Nashville, Tennessee as members of the Southeastern Conference. They finished the season 12–20, 6–12 in SEC play to finish in 13th place. They lost in the first round of the SEC tournament to Georgia.

== Previous season ==
The Commodores finished the 2016–17 season 19–16, 10–8 in SEC play to finish in a three-way tie for fifth place. They defeated Texas A&M and Florida in the SEC tournament before losing in the semifinals to Arkansas. They received an at-large invitation to the NCAA tournament as a #9 seed in the Midwest Region, despite having the most losses, 15, of any at-large recipient, where they lost in the first round to #8 Northwestern.

== Offseason ==
=== Departures ===
Name	Number	Pos.	Height	Weight	Year	Hometown	Reason for departure
Luke Kornet	3	F	7'1"	250	Senior	Lantana, TX	Graduated
Nolan Cressler	24	G	6'4"	210	RS Senior	Pittsburgh, PA	Graduated

=== Incoming transfers ===
Name	Number	Pos.	Height	Weight	Year	Hometown	Previous School
Yanni Wetzell	4	F	6'10"	235	Junior	Auckland, New Zealand	Transferred from St. Mary's (TX). Under NCAA transfer rules, Wetzell will have to sit out for the 2017–18 season. Will have two years of remaining eligibility.
Matt Ryan	32	F	6'7"	228	Junior	Cortlandt Manor, NY	Transferred from Notre Dame. Under NCAA transfer rules, Ryan will have to sit out for the 2017–18 season. Will have two years of remaining eligibility.

=== 2017 recruiting class ===
College recruiting information
Name	Hometown	School	Height	Weight	Commit date
Saben Lee #39 PG	Tempe, AZ	Corona Del Sol High School	6 ft 2 in (1.88 m)	175 lb (79 kg)	Jun 13, 2016
Saben Lee #39 PG	Recruit ratings: Scout: Rivals: 247Sports: ESPN:				
Maxwell Evans #41 PG	Bellaire, TX	Bellaire High School	6 ft 2 in (1.88 m)	165 lb (75 kg)	Aug 7, 2016
Maxwell Evans #41 PG	Recruit ratings: Scout: Rivals: 247Sports: ESPN:				
Ejike Obinna #19 C	Ashburn, VA	Virginia Academy	6 ft 9 in (2.06 m)	220 lb (100 kg)	Sep 25, 2016
Ejike Obinna #19 C	Recruit ratings: Scout: Rivals: 247Sports: ESPN:				
Overall recruit ranking: Scout: 23 Rivals: 30
Note: In many cases, Scout, Rivals, 247Sports, On3, and ESPN may conflict in their listings of height and weight.; In these cases, the average was taken. ESPN grades are on a 100-point scale.; Sources: "Vanderbilt 2017 Basketball Commitments". Rivals.; "2017 Vanderbilt Basketball Commits". Scout.; "ESPN". ESPN.; "Scout.com Team Recruiting Rankings". Scout.; "2017 Team Ranking". Rivals.

=== 2018 Recruiting class ===
College recruiting information
Name	Hometown	School	Height	Weight	Commit date
Aaron Nesmith; SF	Charleston, SC	Porter-Gaud School	6 ft 5 in (1.96 m)	190 lb (86 kg)	Sep 19, 2017
Aaron Nesmith; SF	Recruit ratings: Scout: Rivals: 247Sports: ESPN:				
Darius Garland; PG	Nashville, TN	Brentwood Academy	6 ft 1 in (1.85 m)	170 lb (77 kg)	Nov 13, 2017
Darius Garland; PG	Recruit ratings: Scout: Rivals: 247Sports: ESPN:				
Simisola Shittu; PF	Burlington, ON	Vermont Academy	6 ft 9 in (2.06 m)	220 lb (100 kg)	Nov 22, 2017
Simisola Shittu; PF	Recruit ratings: Scout: Rivals: 247Sports: ESPN:				
Overall recruit ranking:
Note: In many cases, Scout, Rivals, 247Sports, On3, and ESPN may conflict in their listings of height and weight.; In these cases, the average was taken. ESPN grades are on a 100-point scale.; Sources: "Vanderbilt 2018 Basketball Commitments". Rivals.; "2017 Team Ranking". Rivals.

== Roster ==
2017–18 Vanderbilt Commodores men's basketball team
Players
Coaches

Pos.	#	Name	Height	Weight	Year	Previous school	Hometown
G	0	Saben Lee	6 ft 2 in (1.88 m)	174 lb (79 kg)	Fr	Corona del Sol High School	Phoenix, Arizona
G	1	Payton Willis	6 ft 4 in (1.93 m)	182 lb (83 kg)	So	Fayetteville High School	Fayetteville, Arkansas
G/F	2	Joe Toye	6 ft 7 in (2.01 m)	206 lb (93 kg)	Jr	Whitney M. Young Magnet High School	Chicago, Illinois
G	3	Larry Austin Jr.	6 ft 2 in (1.88 m)	182 lb (83 kg)	RS Jr	Xavier	Springfield, Illinois
F/C	4	Yanni Wetzell (I) (redshirt)	6 ft 10 in (2.08 m)	235 lb (107 kg)	Jr	St. Mary's (TX)	Auckland, New Zealand
G/F	5	Matthew Fisher-Davis	6 ft 5 in (1.96 m)	186 lb (84 kg)	Sr	David W. Butler High School	Charlotte, North Carolina
G	10	Maxwell Evans	6 ft 2 in (1.88 m)	186 lb (84 kg)	Fr	Bellaire High School	Houston, Texas
F	11	Jeff Roberson	6 ft 6 in (1.98 m)	220 lb (100 kg)	Sr	The Kinkaid School	Houston, Texas
C	12	Djery Baptiste	6 ft 10 in (2.08 m)	245 lb (111 kg)	RS So	Prestonwood Christian Academy	Gonaïves, Haiti
G	13	Riley LaChance	6 ft 2 in (1.88 m)	195 lb (88 kg)	Sr	Brookfield Central High School	Brookfield, Wisconsin
G	14	Isaiah Rice	5 ft 11 in (1.8 m)	189 lb (86 kg)	Fr	Park Tudor School	Indianapolis, Indiana
F	15	Clevon Brown	6 ft 8 in (2.03 m)	233 lb (106 kg)	So	Winston Churchill High School	San Antonio, Texas
F	32	Matt Ryan (I) (redshirt)	6 ft 8 in (2.03 m)	209 lb (95 kg)	Jr	Notre Dame	Cortlandt Manor, New York
F/C	50	Ejike Obinna	6 ft 10 in (2.08 m)	234 lb (106 kg)	Fr	Virginia Academy (VA)	Enugu, Nigeria

Head coach

- Bryce Drew (Valparaiso)

Assistant coach(es)

- Roger Powell, Jr. (Illinois)
- Jake Diebler (Valparaiso)
- Casey Shaw (Toledo)

Legend

- (C) Team captain
- (S) Suspended
- (I) Ineligible
- (W) Walk-on
- Injured
- Current redshirt

Roster

== Schedule and results ==
Date time, TV	Rank^{#}	Opponent^{#}	Result	Record	High points	High rebounds	High assists	Site (attendance) city, state
Regular season
Nov 10, 2017*; 8:30 pm, SECN		Austin Peay; NIT Season Tip-Off campus game	W 73–54	1–0	13 – Roberson	10 – Roberson	7 – Lee	Memorial Gymnasium (8,609); Nashville, TN
Nov 13, 2017*; 6:30 pm		at Belmont	L 60–69	1–1	19 – Lee	12 – Roberson	2 – Tied	Curb Event Center (5,266); Nashville, TN
Nov 17, 2017*; 7:00 pm, SECN+		UNC Asheville; NIT Season Tip-Off campus game	W 79–76	2–1	17 – 3 tied	12 – Roberson	5 – Lee	Memorial Gymnasium (8,048); Nashville, TN
Nov 19, 2017*; 8:00 pm, SECN		No. 10 USC	L 89–93 ^{OT}	2–2	31 – Fisher-Davis	11 – Fisher-Davis	6 – Austin Jr.	Memorial Gymnasium (8,284); Nashville, TN
Nov 23, 2017*; 4:00 pm, ESPNU		vs. Virginia; NIT Season Tip-Off semifinals	L 42–68	2–3	11 – Fisher-Davis	7 – Obinna	2 – Evans	Barclays Center (1,874); Brooklyn, NY
Nov 24, 2017*; 8:45 pm, ESPNews		vs. No. 20 Seton Hall; NIT Season Tip-Off 3rd place game	L 59–72	2–4	20 – Roberson	13 – Roberson	4 – Lee	Barclays Center (3,952); Brooklyn, NY
Nov 28, 2017*; 8:00 pm, SECN		Radford	W 74–62	3–4	27 – LaChance	9 – Roberson	4 – Willis	Memorial Gymnasium (8,027); Nashville, TN
Dec 3, 2017*; 1:30 pm, SECN+		Kansas State	L 79–84	3–5	22 – Roberson	10 – Roberson	5 – Lee	Memorial Gymnasium (8,570); Nashville, TN
Dec 6, 2017*; 7:00 pm, SECN+		Middle Tennessee	L 63–66	3–6	17 – Fisher-Davis	7 – Fisher-Davis	5 – LaChance	Memorial Gymnasium (8,739); Nashville, TN
Dec 17, 2017*; 1:00 pm, P12N		at No. 5 Arizona State	L 64–76	3–7	24 – Lee	8 – Fisher-Davis	6 – Lee	Wells Fargo Arena (10,797); Tempe, AZ
Dec 20, 2017*; 6:00 pm, SECN+		Houston Baptist	W 81–48	4–7	19 – Fisher-Davis	10 – Roberson	5 – Tied	Memorial Gymnasium (4,623); Nashville, TN
Dec 22, 2017*; 6:00 pm, SECN+		Alcorn State	W 92–51	5–7	21 – Roberson	5 – Tied	4 – 4 tied	Memorial Gymnasium (8,125); Nashville, TN
Dec 30, 2017; 3:00 pm, ESPN2		at Florida	L 74–81	5–8 (0–1)	18 – Roberson	6 – Roberson	4 – Willis	O'Connell Center (10,274); Gainesville, FL
Jan 2, 2018; 6:00 pm, SECN		Alabama	W 76–75	6–8 (1–1)	23 – Lee	7 – Baptiste	5 – LaChance	Memorial Gymnasium (9,519); Nashville, TN
Jan 6, 2018; 5:45 pm, SECN		at South Carolina	L 60–79	6–9 (1–2)	17 – Lee	9 – Roberson	3 – Roberson	Colonial Life Arena (11,391); Columbia, SC
Jan 9, 2018; 8:00 pm, SECN		No. 24 Tennessee	L 84–92	6–10 (1–3)	21 – Lee	4 – Roberson	4 – LaChance	Memorial Gymnasium (11,510); Nashville, TN
Jan 13, 2018; 3:00 pm, ESPN		No. 21 Kentucky	L 67–74	6–11 (1–4)	20 – Roberson	7 – Roberson	4 – LaChance	Memorial Gymnasium (13,389); Nashville, TN
Jan 16, 2018; 6:00 pm, SECN		at Mississippi State	L 62–80	6–12 (1–5)	14 – Obinna	7 – LaChance	4 – Lee	Humphrey Coliseum (6,633); Starkville, MS
Jan 20, 2018; 12:00 pm, SECN		LSU	W 77–71	7–12 (2–5)	26 – LaChance	6 – 3 Tied	5 – Lee	Memorial Gymnasium (8,760); Nashville, TN
Jan 23, 2018; 6:00 pm, ESPNU		at No. 22 Tennessee	L 62–67	7–13 (2–6)	25 – LaChance	6 – Roberson	3 – Tied	Thompson–Boling Arena (14,127); Knoxville, TN
Jan 27, 2018*; 3:00 pm, ESPN2		TCU; Big 12/SEC Challenge	W 81–78	8–13	24 – LaChance	5 – Tied	4 – Tied	Memorial Gymnasium (9,755); Nashville, TN
Jan 30, 2018; 8:00 pm, ESPN		at No. 21 Kentucky	L 81–83 ^{OT}	8–14 (2–7)	23 – Roberson	8 – Roberson	6 – LaChance	Rupp Arena (21,143); Lexington, KY
Feb 3, 2018; 7:30 pm, SECN		at No. 11 Auburn	L 81–93	8–15 (2–8)	30 – Roberson	10 – Roberson	6 – LaChance	Auburn Arena (9,121); Auburn, AL
Feb 7, 2018; 7:30 pm, SECN		Georgia	W 81–66	9–15 (3–8)	19 – Tied	7 – Roberson	4 – Tied	Memorial Gymnasium (8,761); Nashville, TN
Feb 10, 2018; 7:30 pm, SECN		at Arkansas	L 54–72	9–16 (3–9)	8 – Tied	9 – Evans	1 – Tied	Bud Walton Arena (17,083); Fayetteville, AR
Feb 14, 2018; 6:00 pm, SECN		Mississippi State	W 81–80	10–16 (4–9)	22 – Roberson	11 – Roberson	8 – LaChance	Memorial Gymnasium (8,592); Nashville, TN
Feb 17, 2018; 3:00 pm, ESPN2		Florida	W 71–68	11–16 (5–9)	26 – Roberson	7 – Roberson	5 – LaChance	Memorial Gymnasium (10,346); Nashville, TN
Feb 20, 2018; 8:00 pm, SECN		at LSU	L 78–88	11–17 (5–10)	26 – LaChance	6 – Roberson	3 – Tied	Maravich Center (7,517); Baton Rouge, LA
Feb 24, 2018; 3:00 pm, ESPN2		Texas A&M	L 81–89	11–18 (5–11)	21 – Roberson	9 – Roberson	9 – Lee	Memorial Gymnasium (9,376); Nashville, TN
Feb 27, 2018; 6:00 pm, ESPN2		Missouri	L 66–74	11–19 (5–12)	19 – Roberson	7 – Roberson	4 – Lee	Memorial Gymnasium (8,812); Nashville, TN
Mar 3, 2018; 7:30 pm, SECN		at Ole Miss	W 82–69	12–19 (6–12)	19 – Roberson	7 – Roberson	5 – LaChance	The Pavilion at Ole Miss (6,447); Oxford, MS
SEC tournament
Mar 7, 2018; 6:00 pm, SECN	(13)	vs. (12) Georgia; First round	L 62–78	12–20	17 – LaChance	7 – Lee	3 – Tied	Scottrade Center (8,190); St. Louis, MO
*Non-conference game. ^{#}Rankings from AP Poll. (#) Tournament seedings in parentheses. W=West Region. All times are in Central Time.

== See also ==
- 2017–18 Vanderbilt Commodores women's basketball team
