= Les Schwab Invitational =

Basketball tournament

The Les Schwab Invitational (LSI) is Oregon's premier pre-season high school invitational basketball tournament.[1] Prior to its founding in 1996, Oregon's high school teams had to travel out of state for quality pre-season play, denying fans connection to local teams prior to the regular season. In 1994, South Salem High School coach Barry Adams and Beaverton High School coach Nick Robertson, along with the Oregon Athletic Coaches Association, proposed a pre-season tournament to showcase the upcoming season's top teams. After two years of phone calls, lobbying, and meetings, the Oregon State Activities Association approved the proposition and the Oregon Holiday Invitational (renamed in 2000 The Les Schwab Invitational) was born. Since its creation, the tournament has hosted nationally ranked teams from many states including Virginia, New York, Nevada, Louisiana, Texas, Maryland, Georgia, Florida, Pennsylvania, and numerous top teams from California. The LSI is a 4-day, 32-game, boy's high school basketball tournament. It features 16 teams chosen from Oregon's top schools and elite national teams through a partnership with Nike. Prime Time Sports is the owner and promoter of the tournament which was founded by co-tournament creator John McCallum.

== Facts ==
- Played in the month of December, usually between December 26 and January 1.
- Is a 5-day, 32-game, and 16-team tournament.
- Tournament awards include: "The Mr.Hustle Award", "Tournament MVP" and "The Shawn Zinsli Team Sportsmanship Award"
- Participating teams raise money for their basketball programs through ticket sales and sponsor donations
- Oak Hill Academy, from Mouth of Wilson, Virginia has won seven LSI championships ('97, '01, '04, '06, '11, '15, '17)
- 66 Les Schwab Invitational participants have gone on to play in the NBA
- Kevin Durant, the 2008 NBA Rookie of the Year was a player in the 2004 LSI while at Oak Hill Academy
- Kevin Love is the only freshman to ever be named LSI Most Valuable Player as he did in 2003 while at Lake Oswego High School

== Venues ==
Year-Venue(s)

- 1996 -Westview High School-Portland, OR.; South Salem High School, Salem, OR.; The University of Portland, Portland, OR.; Beaverton High School, Beaverton, OR.
- 1997-Lewis and Clark College, Portland, OR.
- 1998-Lewis and Clark College, Portland, OR.
- 1999-Lewis and Clark College, Portland, OR.
- 2000-Memorial Coliseum, Portland, OR.
- 2001-Memorial Coliseum, Portland, OR.
- 2002-The University of Portland, Portland, OR.
- 2003-The University of Portland, Portland, OR.
- 2004–2023-Liberty High School, Hillsboro, OR.
- 2024–Present-Viking Pavilion @ Portland State, Portland, OR.

== Teams invited ==
- Oregon State classification basketball teams from any level as well as the top teams from the Northwest are invited based on selections made by a committee that meets each January.
- 3-4 nationally ranked Nike-sponsored teams are also brought in from around the country.

== Past champions ==
Year School

- 1996 Beaverton High School Beavers
- 1997 Oak Hill Academy Warriors
- 1998 Crenshaw High School Cougars
- 1999 Jefferson High School Democrats
- 2000 Dominguez High School Dons
- 2001 Oak Hill Academy Warriors
- 2002 Bishop O’Connell High School Knights
- 2003 Jesuit High School Crusaders
- 2004 Oak Hill Academy Warriors
- 2005 Reserve Christian Eagles
- 2006 Oak Hill Academy Warriors
- 2007 Archbishop Mitty High School Monarchs
- 2008 Dominguez High School Dons
- 2009 Westchester High School Comets
- 2010 DeMatha Catholic Stags
- 2011 Oak Hill Academy Warriors
- 2012 Lake Oswego High School Lakers
- 2013 Rainier Beach High School Vikings
- 2014 Montverde Academy Eagles
- 2015 Oak Hill Academy Warriors
- 2016 Nathan Hale High School Raiders
- 2017 Oak Hill Academy Warriors
- 2018 Sierra Canyon School Trailblazers
- 2019 Mater Dei High School Monarchs
- 2020 Cancelled due to COVID-19 Pandemic
- 2021 Link Academy Lions
- 2022 West Linn High School Lions
- 2023 Columbus High School Explorers
- 2024 Gonzaga College High School Eagles
- 2025 Sierra Canyon School Trailblazers

== Tournament MVPs ==
Incomplete list of tournament Most Valuable Player award winners.

Year	Player	School
1996	Keon Coleman	Beaverton High School
1997	Lloyd Price	Oak Hill Academy
1998	Jonathan Stokes	Crenshaw High School
1999	Brian Michaelson	Jesuit High School
2000	Tyson Chandler	Dominguez High School
2001	Carmelo Anthony	Oak Hill Academy
2002	Ndudi Ebi	Westbury Christian School
2003	Kevin Love	Lake Oswego High School
2004	Jamont Gordon	Oak Hill Academy
2005	Tweety Carter	Reserve Christian School
2006	Brandon Jennings	Oak Hill Academy
2007	Drew Gordon	Archbishop Mitty High School
2008	Renardo Sidney	Fairfax High School
2009	Doron Lamb	Oak Hill Academy
2010	James Robinson	DeMatha Catholic
2011	Tyler Lewis	Oak Hill Academy
2012	Khyan Rayner	Jesuit High School
2013	Shaqquan Aaron	Rainier Beach High School
2014	Ben Simmons	Montverde Academy
2015	Markelle Fultz	DeMatha Catholic
2016	Michael Porter Jr.	Nathan Hale High School
2017	Keldon Johnson	Oak Hill Academy
2018	Scottie Pippen Jr.	Sierra Canyon School
2019	Devin Askew	Mater Dei High School
2020	Cancelled due to the COVID-19 pandemic	
2021	Jordan Walsh	Link Academy
2022	Jackson Shelstad	West Linn High School
2023	Cameron Boozer	Columbus High School
2024	Christian Gurdak	Gonzaga College High School
2025	Brandon McCoy Jr.	Sierra Canyon School

In 2016, Marvin Bagley III of Sierra Canyon School was named the tournament's Most Outstanding Player.

== LSI participants named McDonald's All Americans ==
- Carmelo Anthony | Oak Hill Academy, Mouth of Wilson, VA 2001
- Andre Barrett | Rice High School, New York, NY 1999
- Evan Burns | Fairfax High School, Los Angeles, CA 2000
- Tweety Carter | Reserve Christian, Laplace, LA 2005
- Tyson Chandler | Dominguez High School, Compton, CA 2000
- Eric Devendorf | Oak Hill Academy, Mouth of Wilson, VA 2004
- Mike Dunleavy Jr. | Jesuit High School, Portland, OR 1998
- Kevin Durant | Oak Hill Academy, Mouth of Wilson, VA 2004
- Ndudi Ebi | Westbury Christian, Houston, TX 2002
- Donté Greene | Towson Catholic, Towson, MD 2005
- JJ Hickson | Wheeler High School, Marietta, GA 2006
- Brandon Jennings | Oak Hill Academy, Mouth of Wilson, VA 2006
- Terrence Jones | Jefferson High School, Portland, OR 2010
- Doron Lamb | Oak Hill Academy, Mouth of Wilson, VA 2009
- Tywon Lawson | Oak Hill Academy, Mouth of Wilson, VA 2004
- Kevin Love | Lake Oswego High School, Lake Oswego, OR 2007
- Kyle Wiltjer | Jesuit High School, Beaverton, OR 2011
- Jaylen Brown | Wheeler High School, Marietta, GA 2015
- Ben Simmons | Montverde Academy, Montverde, FL 2015
- Michael Porter Jr | Nathan Hale High School, Seattle, WA 2017
- Keldon Johnson | Oak Hill Academy, Mouth of Wilson, VA 2018
- Vernon Carey Jr. | NSU University School, Fort Lauderdale, FL 2019*
- Scottie Barnes | University School, Fort Lauderdale, FL 2020
- Nathan Bittle | Crater High School, Crater, OR 2021
- Nolan Hickman | Eastside Catholic, Seattle, WA 2021
- Julian Phillips | Link Academy, Branson, MO 2022
- Amari Bailey | Sierra Canyon, Chatsworth, CA 2022
- Jordan Walsh | Link Academy, Branson, MO 2022
- Mookie Cook | Jefferson High, Portland, OR 2023
- Ron Holland | Duncanville High School, Duncanville, TX 2023
- Omaha Biliew | Link Academy, Branson, MO 2023
- Bronny James | Sierra Canyon, Chatsworth, CA 2023
- Trent Perry | Harvard-Westlake, Hollywood, CA 2024
- Koa Peat | Perry High School, Gilbert, AZ 2025
- Kevin Lyde | Oak Hill Academy, Mouth of Wilson, VA 1998
- Casey Sanders | Tampa Preparatory School, Tampa, FL 1999
- Omar Cook | Christ the King Regional High School, Queens, NY 2000
- D. J. White | Hillcrest High School, Tuscaloosa, AL 2004

== Les Schwab Invitational NBA players ==
LSI participants who went on to play in the NBA, with high school and the year(s) they played in the tournament.

- Carmelo Anthony – Oak Hill Academy (2001)
- Marvin Bagley III – Sierra Canyon School (2016)
- Amari Bailey – Sierra Canyon School (2018)
- Scottie Barnes – University School (2018)
- Andre Barrett – Rice High School (1999)
- MarJon Beauchamp – Nathan Hale High School (2016)
- Cameron Boozer – Columbus High School (2023, 2025)
- Jaylen Brown – Wheeler High School (2014)
- Vernon Carey Jr. – University School (2018)
- Tyson Chandler – Dominguez High School (2000)
- Zach Collins – Bishop Gorman High School
- Omar Cook – Christ the King Regional High School
- Quinn Cook – DeMatha Catholic (2010)
- Mike Dunleavy Jr. – Jesuit High School (1996–98)
- Kevin Durant – Oak Hill Academy (2004)
- Tari Eason – Garfield High School (2018)
- Ndudi Ebi – Westbury Christian School (2002)
- Drew Eubanks – Reynolds High School
- Markelle Fultz – DeMatha Catholic (2015)
- Aaron Gordon – Archbishop Mitty High School (2012)
- Drew Gordon – Archbishop Mitty High School (2007)
- Jerami Grant – DeMatha Catholic (2010)
- Donté Greene – Towson Catholic High School (2005)
- Jordan Hamilton – Dominguez High School (2008)
- A. J. Hammons – Oak Hill Academy (2011)
- Roy Hibbert – Georgetown Preparatory School
- J. J. Hickson – Wheeler High School (2006)
- Ron Holland – Duncanville High School (2022)
- Bronny James – Sierra Canyon School (2022)
- Brandon Jennings – Oak Hill Academy (2006)
- Keldon Johnson – Oak Hill Academy (2017)
- Freddie Jones – Barlow High School (1996–97)
- Terrence Jones – Jefferson High School (2008–09)
- Christian Koloko – Sierra Canyon School (2018)
- Doron Lamb – Oak Hill Academy (2009)
- Ty Lawson – Oak Hill Academy (2004)
- Kevin Love – Lake Oswego High School (2003–06)
- Kenyon Martin Jr. – Sierra Canyon School (2018)
- Aaron Miles – Jefferson High School (1999)
- Greg Monroe – Helen Cox High School (2007)
- Shabazz Muhammad – Bishop Gorman High School (2010)
- Dejounte Murray – Rainier Beach High School (2013)
- Jaylen Nowell – Garfield High School (2015–16)
- Jahlil Okafor – Whitney Young Magnet High School (2013)
- Julian Phillips – Link Academy (2021)
- Scottie Pippen Jr. – Sierra Canyon School (2018)
- Jontay Porter – Nathan Hale High School (2016)
- Kevin Porter Jr. – Rainier Beach High School (2017)
- Michael Porter Jr. – Nathan Hale High School (2016)
- Koa Peat – Perry High School (2023)
- Payton Pritchard – West Linn High School (2012–15)
- Jase Richardson – Columbus High School (2023)
- Terrence Ross – Jefferson High School (2008)
- Ben Simmons – Montverde Academy (2014)
- Kyle Singler – South Medford High School (2005–06)
- Nolan Smith – Oak Hill Academy (2006)
- Cassius Stanley – Sierra Canyon School (2018)
- D. J. Strawberry – Mater Dei High School (2001)
- JT Thor – Norcross High School (2019)
- Greivis Vásquez – Montrose Christian School
- Kemba Walker – Rice High School
- Jordan Walsh – Link Academy (2021)
- Lindell Wigginton – Oak Hill Academy (2015)
- D. J. White – Hillcrest High School
- Kyle Wiltjer – Jesuit High School (2010)
- Stephen Zimmerman – Bishop Gorman High School (2014)

== LSI participants in the Nike Hoop Summit ==
LSI participants who later played in the Nike Hoop Summit, with the Hoop Summit year and team.

- 1998 – Kevin Lyde, Oak Hill Academy (USA)
- 1999 – Mike Dunleavy Jr., Jesuit High School (USA)
- 1999 – Casey Sanders, Tampa Preparatory School (USA)
- 2000 – Nick Anderson, Southern University Laboratory School (USA)
- 2000 – Omar Cook, Christ the King Regional High School (USA)
- 2004 – Churchill Odia, Montrose Christian School (World)
- 2004 – D. J. White, Hillcrest High School (USA)
- 2005 – Uche Echefu, Montrose Christian School (World)
- 2005 – K. J. Matsui, Montrose Christian School (World)
- 2006 – Kevin Durant, Oak Hill Academy (USA)
- 2006 – Ty Lawson, Oak Hill Academy (USA)
- 2007 – Donté Greene, Towson Catholic High School (USA)
- 2007 – Kevin Love, Lake Oswego High School (USA)
- 2007 – Kyle Singler, South Medford High School (USA)
- 2007 – Nolan Smith, Oak Hill Academy (USA)
- 2008 – Drew Gordon, Archbishop Mitty High School (USA)
- 2008 – Greg Monroe, Helen Cox High School (USA)
- 2009 – Renardo Sidney, Fairfax High School (USA)
- 2010 – Terrence Jones, Jefferson High School (USA)
- 2011 – Quinn Cook, DeMatha Catholic (USA)
- 2011 – Kyle Wiltjer, Jesuit High School (World)
- 2012 – Shabazz Muhammad, Bishop Gorman High School (USA)
- 2013 – Aaron Gordon, Archbishop Mitty High School (USA)
- 2014 – Jahlil Okafor, Whitney Young Magnet High School (USA)
- 2015 – Jaylen Brown, Wheeler High School (USA)
- 2015 – Ben Simmons, Montverde Academy (World)
- 2015 – Stephen Zimmerman, Bishop Gorman High School (USA)
- 2016 – Markelle Fultz, DeMatha Catholic (USA)
- 2016 – Payton Pritchard, West Linn High School (USA)
- 2017 – Michael Porter Jr., Nathan Hale High School (USA)
- 2017 – Lindell Wigginton, Oak Hill Academy (World)
- 2018 – Keldon Johnson, Oak Hill Academy (USA)
- 2019 – Vernon Carey Jr., University School (USA)
- 2020 – Scottie Barnes, University School (USA; game cancelled)
- 2022 – Amari Bailey, Sierra Canyon School (USA)
- 2022 – Omaha Biliew, Link Academy (World)
- 2023 – Omaha Biliew, Link Academy (USA)
- 2023 – Ron Holland, Duncanville High School (USA)
- 2023 – Bronny James, Sierra Canyon School (USA)
- 2023 – Jackson Shelstad, West Linn High School (USA)
- 2025 – Cameron Boozer, Columbus High School (USA)
- 2025 – Cayden Boozer, Columbus High School (USA)
- 2025 – Koa Peat, Perry High School (USA)
- 2026 – Maximo Adams, Sierra Canyon School (World)
- 2026 – Caleb Gaskins, Columbus High School (USA)
- 2026 – Brandon McCoy Jr., Sierra Canyon School (USA)
- 2026 – Tyran Stokes, Rainier Beach High School (USA)

== Sponsors ==
The current presenting sponsor is Express Employment Professionals. The tournament's two main sponsors who have been involved from the beginning are Les Schwab Tires and Nike, both Oregon based companies. Les Schwab Tires is the title sponsor and Nike is the premier sports brand in the world.
