= Washington Mr. Basketball =

Honor awarded to high school basketball players

The Washington Mr. Basketball honor recognizes the top high school basketball player in the state of Washington. The award is presented annually by the Washington Interscholastic Basketball Coaches Association.

== Award winners ==
Year	Player	High School	College	NBA Draft
1994	Michael Dickerson	Federal Way	Arizona	1998 NBA draft: 1st rd, 14th overall by the Houston Rockets
1995	Donald Watts	Lake Washington	Washington	
1996	Quincy Wilder	Decatur	Highline/USC/Evergreen State	
1997	Michael Johnson	Ballard	Washington	
1998	Grant Leep	Mount Vernon	Washington	
1999	Curtis Borchardt	Eastlake	Stanford	2002 NBA draft: 1st rd, 18th overall by the Orlando Magic
2000	Luke Ridnour	Blaine	Oregon	2003 NBA draft: 1st rd, 14th overall by the Seattle SuperSonics
2001	Eroll Knight	Chief Sealth	Washington/Gonzaga	
2002	Justin Holt	Tacoma Lincoln	Tacoma/Indian Hills	
2003	Aaron Brooks	Franklin	Oregon	2007 NBA draft: 1st rd, 26th overall by the Houston Rockets
2004	David Pendergraft	Brewster	Gonzaga	
2005	Jon Brockman	Snohomish	Washington	2009 NBA draft: 2nd rd, 38th overall by the Portland Trail Blazers
2006	Spencer Hawes	Seattle Prep	Washington	2007 NBA draft: 1st rd, 10th overall by the Sacramento Kings
2007	Venoy Overton	Franklin	Washington	
2008	Shawn Stockton	Ferris	Montana	
2009	Peyton Siva	Franklin	Louisville	2013 NBA draft: 2nd rd, 56th overall by the Detroit Pistons
2010	Joe Harris	Chelan	Virginia	2014 NBA draft: 2nd rd, 33rd overall by the Cleveland Cavaliers
2011	Gary Bell Jr.	Kentridge	Gonzaga	
2012	Jordan Chatman	Union	BYU, Boston College	
2013	Zach LaVine	Bothell	UCLA	2014 NBA draft: 1st rd, 13th overall by the Minnesota Timberwolves
2014	Jason Todd	Jackson	Portland	
2015	Dejounte Murray	Rainier Beach	Washington	2016 NBA draft: 1st rd, 29th overall by the San Antonio Spurs
2016	JaQuori McLaughlin	Peninsula	Oregon State/UC Santa Barbara	
2017	Michael Porter Jr.	Nathan Hale	Missouri	2018 NBA draft: 1st rd, 14th overall by the Denver Nuggets
2018	Kevin Porter Jr.	Rainier Beach	USC	2019 NBA draft: 1st rd, 30th overall by the Cleveland Cavaliers
2019	Anton Watson	Gonzaga Preparatory School	Gonzaga	2024 NBA draft: 2nd rd, 54th overall by the Boston Celtics
2020	Tanner Toolson	Union	BYU	
2021	--	No award given		
2022	Tyler Bilodeau	Kamiakin	Oregon State	2026 NBA draft: 2nd rd, 43rd overall by the Brooklyn Nets
2023	Brooklyn Hicks	Timberline	UNLV	
2024	Jacob Cofie	Eastside Catholic	Virginia/USC	
2025	Jaylen Petty	Rainier Beach	Kansas	
2026	Tyran Stokes	Rainier Beach	Kansas	

== Winners by school ==
School	Number of Awards	Years
Franklin	3	2003, 2007, 2009
Rainier Beach	4	2015, 2018, 2025, 2026
Union	2	2012, 2020
21 other schools	1	
