= MarJon Beauchamp =

American basketball player (born 2000)

- Beauchamp with Bayern Munich in 2026

No. 3 – Bayern Munich
- Position: Small forward
- League: BBL; EuroLeague

Personal information
- Born: October 12, 2000 (age 26) Yakima, Washington, U.S.
- Listed height: 2.00 m (6 ft 7 in)
- Listed weight: 199 lb (90 kg)

Career information
- High school: Nathan Hale (Seattle, Washington); Garfield (Seattle, Washington); Rainier Beach (Seattle, Washington); Dream City Christian (Glendale, Arizona)
- College: Yakima Valley (2021)
- NBA draft: 2022: 1st round, 24th overall pick
- Drafted by: Milwaukee Bucks
- Playing career: 2021–present

Career history
- 2021–2022: NBA G League Ignite
- 2022–2025: Milwaukee Bucks
- 2023–2024: →Wisconsin Herd
- 2025: Los Angeles Clippers
- 2025: New York Knicks
- 2025: →Westchester Knicks
- 2025: Delaware Blue Coats
- 2025–2026: Philadelphia 76ers
- 2025–2026: →Delaware Blue Coats
- 2026–present: Bayern Munich

Career highlights
- NBA Cup champion (2024)
- Stats at NBA.com
- Stats at Basketball Reference

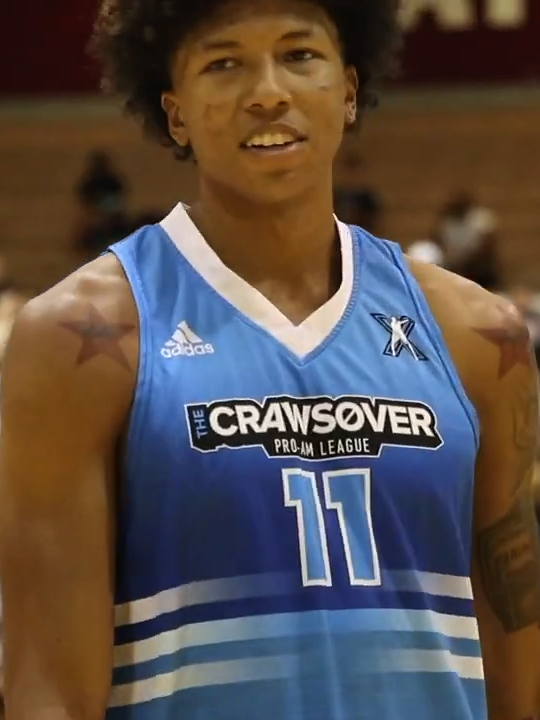
Beauchamp in 2022

MarJon Beauchamp (/ˈmɑːrʒɒn ˈboʊtʃæmp/ MAR-zhon BOH-champ; born October 12, 2000) is an American professional basketball player for Bayern Munich of the German Basketball Bundesliga (BBL) and the EuroLeague. He played college basketball for the Yakima Valley Yaks.

== High school career ==
Before entering high school, Beauchamp moved from his hometown of Yakima, Washington, to Seattle to play basketball at Nathan Hale High School under head coach Brandon Roy and to face stronger competition. As a freshman, he was a deep reserve for a team that featured top recruits Michael Porter Jr. and Jontay Porter. Nathan Hale finished with a 29–0 record, won the Washington Interscholastic Activities Association Class 3A state title, and captured the No. 1 national ranking from MaxPreps. As a sophomore, Beauchamp transferred to Garfield High School in Seattle. He moved to the school with former Nathan Hale coach Brandon Roy and teammate P. J. Fuller. He won his second straight Class 3A state championship and helped Garfield reach the quarterfinals at High School Nationals.

For his junior season, Beauchamp transferred to Rainier Beach High School in Seattle, citing a lack of motivation in class and sickness from mold in his house during his time at Garfield. He moved to the South End, within school boundaries, and as a result was ruled eligible to play basketball for his new school. After leading Rainier Beach to league and district titles, he was named most valuable player of the Seattle 3A Metro League. Beauchamp guided his team to a Class 3A state semifinal appearance and fifth place in the state tournament. He averaged 26 points, 11 rebounds, and five assists per game and was named to the USA Today All-USA Washington second team, Associated Press Class 3A All-State first team, and The Seattle Times All-State second team. Beauchamp transferred to Dream City Christian School, a school in Glendale, Arizona with a new basketball program, for his senior season. After finishing his high school basketball career he went back to his hometown of Yakima to graduate from Eisenhower High School.

=== Recruiting ===
After his freshman season, Beauchamp held offers from four NCAA Division I programs, including Washington. His success on the Amateur Athletic Union circuit helped him earn a five-star rating from recruiting websites before his junior season. Beauchamp was rated a consensus four-star recruit by major recruiting services at the end of his high school career. On August 1, 2019, he announced that he would forgo college basketball.

College recruiting
Name	Hometown	School	Height	Weight	Commit date
MarJon Beauchamp; SF	Yakima, WA	Dream City Christian (AZ)	6 ft 6 in (1.98 m)	175 lb (79 kg)	—
MarJon Beauchamp; SF	Recruit ratings: Rivals: 247Sports: ESPN: (87)				
Overall recruit ranking: Rivals: 48 247Sports: 34 ESPN: 44
Note: In many cases, Scout, Rivals, 247Sports, On3, and ESPN may conflict in their listings of height and weight.; In these cases, the average was taken. ESPN grades are on a 100-point scale.; Sources: "2020 Team Ranking". Rivals.

== College career ==
Following high school, Beauchamp trained with Chameleon BX, a training program based in San Francisco, to prepare for the 2021 NBA draft. After over six months with the program, he returned to Washington due to the COVID-19 pandemic and began reconsidering his college options. In March 2021, Beauchamp joined the basketball team at Yakima Valley Community College in his hometown, being drawn by his friendship with players on the team. In his college debut on April 20, 2021, Beauchamp had nine points and nine rebounds in a 99–90 loss over Treasure Valley, and felt lingering respiratory limitations. On June 1, he recorded a career-high 50 points and 11 rebounds in a 107–106 overtime loss to Treasure Valley. As a freshman, Beauchamp averaged 30.7 points, 10.5 rebounds and 4.8 assists per game through 12 games, leading the Northwest Athletic Conference in scoring. He drew attention from Washington, Washington State, Oregon, Texas Tech, Arkansas and LSU, but opted to forgo attending a Division I university due to concerns about his amateur status.

== Professional career ==
=== NBA G League Ignite (2021–2022) ===
On September 23, 2021, Beauchamp signed with the NBA G League Ignite of the NBA G League. He averaged 15.1 points, 7.3 rebounds and 2.3 assists per game.

=== Milwaukee Bucks (2022–2025) ===
On June 23, 2022, the Milwaukee Bucks drafted Beauchamp 24th overall in the 2022 NBA draft. He joined the Bucks' 2022 NBA Summer League roster. In his Summer League debut, Beauchamp scored sixteen points in a 94–90 win over the Brooklyn Nets. On July 7, 2022, Beauchamp signed a rookie-scale contract with the Bucks. On November 9, Beauchamp set a career high with 19 points scored, along with 8 rebounds grabbed, during a 136–132 win over the Oklahoma City Thunder. On November 14, Beauchamp set a new career high with 20 points during a 121–106 loss to the Atlanta Hawks. On 24 January 2024, playing for the Milwaukee Bucks's G-League affiliate team Wisconsin Herd, Beauchamp scored 36 points on 13-26 shooting along with 5 rebounds and 3 assists from the field in a 107–120 win against the Birmingham Squadron.

=== Los Angeles Clippers (2025) ===
On February 6, 2025, Beauchamp was traded to the Los Angeles Clippers in exchange for Kevin Porter Jr. On March 1, Beauchamp was waived by the Clippers.

=== New York Knicks (2025) ===
On March 4, 2025, Beauchamp signed a two-way contract with the New York Knicks.

=== Delaware Blue Coats / Philadelphia 76ers (2025–2026) ===
On October 14, 2025, Beauchamp signed an Exhibit 10 contract with the Philadelphia 76ers following the release of Emoni Bates. However, four days later, Beauchamp was waived by the 76ers. On December 23, Beauchamp signed a two-way contract with the 76ers after an impressive run playing for their G League affiliate, the Delaware Blue Coats. Beauchamp averaged over 26.5 points, seven rebounds, and three assists over five games.

=== Bayern Munich (2026–present) ===
On August 12, 2026, Beauchamp signed a one-year contract with Bayern Munich of the German Basketball Bundesliga (BBL) and the EuroLeague.

== Career statistics ==
Legend
GP	Games played	GS	Games started	MPG	Minutes per game
FG%	Field goal percentage	3P%	3-point field goal percentage	FT%	Free throw percentage
RPG	Rebounds per game	APG	Assists per game	SPG	Steals per game
BPG	Blocks per game	PPG	Points per game	**Bold**	Career high

=== NBA ===
==== Regular season ====
Year	Team	GP	GS	MPG	FG%	3P%	FT%	RPG	APG	SPG	BPG	PPG
2022–23	Milwaukee	**52**	**11**	13.5	.395	.331	.730	2.2	.7	.4	.1	5.1
2023–24	Milwaukee	48	1	12.7	.488	.400	.679	2.1	.6	.3	.1	4.4
2024–25	Milwaukee	26	0	4.7	.383	.333	.750	1.2	.3	.1	.0	2.0
2024–25	L.A. Clippers	3	0	5.7	**.571**	**.667**	.500	1.0	.7	.0	.0	4.0
2024–25	New York	6	0	2.8	.455	.200	**1.000**	1.5	.2	.2	.0	2.5
2025–26	Philadelphia	14	1	**14.0**	.434	.340	.684	**2.3**	**1.1**	**.6**	**.3**	**6.8**
Career		149	13	11.1	.431	.352	.712	1.9	.6	.3	.1	4.4

==== Playoffs ====
Year	Team	GP	GS	MPG	FG%	3P%	FT%	RPG	APG	SPG	BPG	PPG
2023	Milwaukee	2	0	**2.6**	**.667**	**1.000**	—	**.5**	.0	.0	.0	**2.5**
2024	Milwaukee	**4**	0	2.4	.250	.000	.500	.3	**.5**	.0	.0	.8
Career		6	0	2.5	.429	.333	.500	.3	.3	.0	.0	1.3

=== College ===
Year	Team	GP	GS	MPG	FG%	3P%	FT%	RPG	APG	SPG	BPG	PPG
2020–21	Yakima Valley	12	10	36.4	.525	.398	.768	10.5	4.8	1.3	1.1	30.7
Career		12	10	36.4	.525	.398	.768	10.5	4.8	1.3	1.1	30.7

== Personal life ==
Beauchamp is a Christian. Beauchamp's father, Jon, played college basketball for Eastern Washington University and Highline College. Jon is a former radio personality and works in customer relations in Bellevue, Washington. Beauchamp is of Native American descent, from the Mission Indians and La Jolla Band of Luiseño Indians. He is the grandson of Henry Beauchamp, the first African-American mayor of Yakima.
