= Lodrick Stewart =

American basketball player

Personal information
- Born: April 30, 1985 (age 41)
- Listed height: 6 ft 4 in (1.93 m)
- Listed weight: 210 lb (95 kg)

Career information
- High school: Rainier Beach (Seattle, Washington)
- College: USC (2003–2007)
- NBA draft: 2007: undrafted
- Position: Shooting guard

Career history
- 2007–2008: Anaheim Arsenal
- 2008–2009: Giants Nördlingen

Lodrick Stewart (born April 30, 1985) is a former American college basketball player. He played at the University of Southern California. Lodrick and twin brother Rodrick, attended Joyner Elementary School in Tupelo, Mississippi, before moving to Seattle, Washington.

== Personal life ==
Stewart has a twin brother named Rodrick Stewart, and they have younger twin brothers, Hikeem and Kadeem Stewart, who played for University of Washington and Shoreline Community College, and their youngest brother Scotty Ewing played for South Puget Sound Community College and is now playing professionally in China.

Stewart's son Jaylin plays college basketball at UConn.

== High school career ==
Stewart attended basketball powerhouse Rainier Beach High School in Seattle. He played alongside his brother Rodrick, Nate Robinson, Terrence Williams, and C. J. Giles. As a senior, he led his basketball team to a 28–1 record and won the AAA state championship.

== College career ==
Stewart played for the USC Trojans between 2003 and 2007. He was honorable mention Pac-10 his senior year and is the all-time 3 point leader for the Trojans. Stewart graduated from USC in 2007.

== Pro career ==
Stewart played for the NBA Development League Anaheim Arsenal in 2007–2008.

In 2008–2009, Stewart played for the Giants Nördlingen in Germany. Later he went to Lithuania, Marijampolės "Sūduva".

On March 8, 2010, it was reported that Stewart and another American player, Rashaun Broadus, left the team without saying a word after a game on February 23, 2010, against Perlas.
