= Michael Dickerson =

American basketball player (born 1975)

Personal information
- Born: June 25, 1975 (age 51) Greenville, South Carolina, U.S.
- Listed height: 6 ft 5 in (1.96 m)
- Listed weight: 180 lb (82 kg)

Career information
- High school: Federal Way (Federal Way, Washington)
- College: Arizona (1994–1998)
- NBA draft: 1998: 1st round, 14th overall pick
- Drafted by: Houston Rockets
- Playing career: 1998–2010
- Position: Shooting guard
- Number: 3, 8

Career history
- 1998–1999: Houston Rockets
- 1999–2003: Vancouver / Memphis Grizzlies
- 2009–2010: Faymasa Palencia

Career highlights
- NBA All-Rookie Second Team (1999); NCAA champion (1997); Third-team All-American – AP (1998); 2× First-team All-Pac-10 (1997, 1998); Washington Mr. Basketball (1994)

Career NBA statistics
- Points: 3,257 (15.4 ppg)
- Rebounds: 609 (2.9 rpg)
- Assists: 553 (2.6 apg)
- Stats at NBA.com
- Stats at Basketball Reference

Michael DeAngelo Dickerson (born June 25, 1975) is an American former professional basketball player who was a member of the Houston Rockets and Vancouver / Memphis Grizzlies of the National Basketball Association (NBA). The 6 ft 5 in shooting guard was born in Greenville, South Carolina and raised in both Kent and Federal Way, Washington.

== Career ==
=== Before the NBA ===
He played basketball at Decatur High School (Federal Way, Washington) in his sophomore season followed by Federal Way High School in his junior and senior years. He went to college at the University of Arizona, where he won the 1997 national championship on a team with Mike Bibby, Jason Terry, and Miles Simon. Dickerson was Arizona's leading scorer in the 1996-97 championship season (18.9 points per game) and averaged another team-high 18.0 points per game in 1997–98. In 2011, he was inducted into the Pac-12 Hall of Honor.

=== Houston Rockets (1998–99) ===
He was selected as the 14th overall pick by the Rockets in the 1998 NBA draft and played for them during the lockout-shortened 1998–1999 NBA season, in which Dickerson led the league in games played (50), was sixth in three-point field goal percentage (.433), and was named to the All-Rookie 2nd Team. He was reluctantly traded in 1999 to the Vancouver Grizzlies for Vancouver's draft pick, Steve Francis, who had demanded a trade because he did not want to play for Vancouver.

=== Vancouver/Memphis Grizzlies (1999–2003) ===
Dickerson played all 82 games for the Grizzlies in 1999–2000, averaging 18.2 points, 3.4 rebounds, 2.5 assists and 1.41 steals per game. His scoring average fell to 16.3 points per game the following season. After the Grizzlies relocated to Memphis, Tennessee, he played in just four and six games over the next two seasons due to injuries. Dickerson was released by the Grizzlies on October 27, 2003 and prematurely retired due to severe hamstring and groin injuries from which he was unable to fully recover. Dickerson was one of the many players in the history of the team that publicly expressed they enjoyed their time in Vancouver.

=== Cleveland Cavaliers (2008) ===
Dickerson was invited to training camp by the Cleveland Cavaliers, but was waived on October 8, 2008. He holds career NBA averages of 15.4 points, 2.9 rebounds and 2.6 assists per game in 212 contests. During his retirement he traveled to India and Tibet.

=== Spanish League ===
In 2009, Dickerson returned to basketball for one year as a member of Faymasa Palencia, playing in the second league of the Spanish basketball league system. He appeared in four games for Palencia, averaging 11.8 points per outing. At the end of the season, he retired once more.

== NBA career statistics ==
Legend
GP	Games played	GS	Games started	MPG	Minutes per game
FG%	Field goal percentage	3P%	3-point field goal percentage	FT%	Free throw percentage
RPG	Rebounds per game	APG	Assists per game	SPG	Steals per game
BPG	Blocks per game	PPG	Points per game	**Bold**	Career high
*	Led the league

=== Regular season ===
Year	Team	GP	GS	MPG	FG%	3P%	FT%	RPG	APG	SPG	BPG	PPG
1998–99	Houston	50*	50*	31.2	.465	**.433**	.639	1.7	1.9	0.5	0.2	10.9
1999–00	Vancouver	**82**	**82***	**37.8**	**.436**	.409	.830	**3.4**	2.5	**1.4**	**0.5**	**18.2**
2000–01	Vancouver	70	69	37.4	.417	.374	.763	3.3	**3.3**	0.9	0.4	16.3
2001–02	Memphis	4	4	31.0	.313	.381	.833	3.0	2.3	0.8	0.3	10.8
2002–03	Memphis	6	1	14.5	.417	.364	**1.000**	1.0	1.3	0.8	0.2	4.8
Career		212	206	35.3	.432	.402	.784	2.9	2.6	1.0	0.4	15.4

=== Playoffs ===
Year	Team	GP	GS	MPG	FG%	3P%	FT%	RPG	APG	SPG	BPG	PPG
1999	Houston	4	4	20.5	.273	.375	.500	1.0	0.8	0.5	0.8	4.3

== Personal ==
Dickerson is a cousin of former NBA guard David Wesley, and is a father to two daughters.

== See also ==
- List of National Basketball Association career 3-point field goal percentage leaders
