= Joe Harris (basketball) =

American basketball player (born 1991)

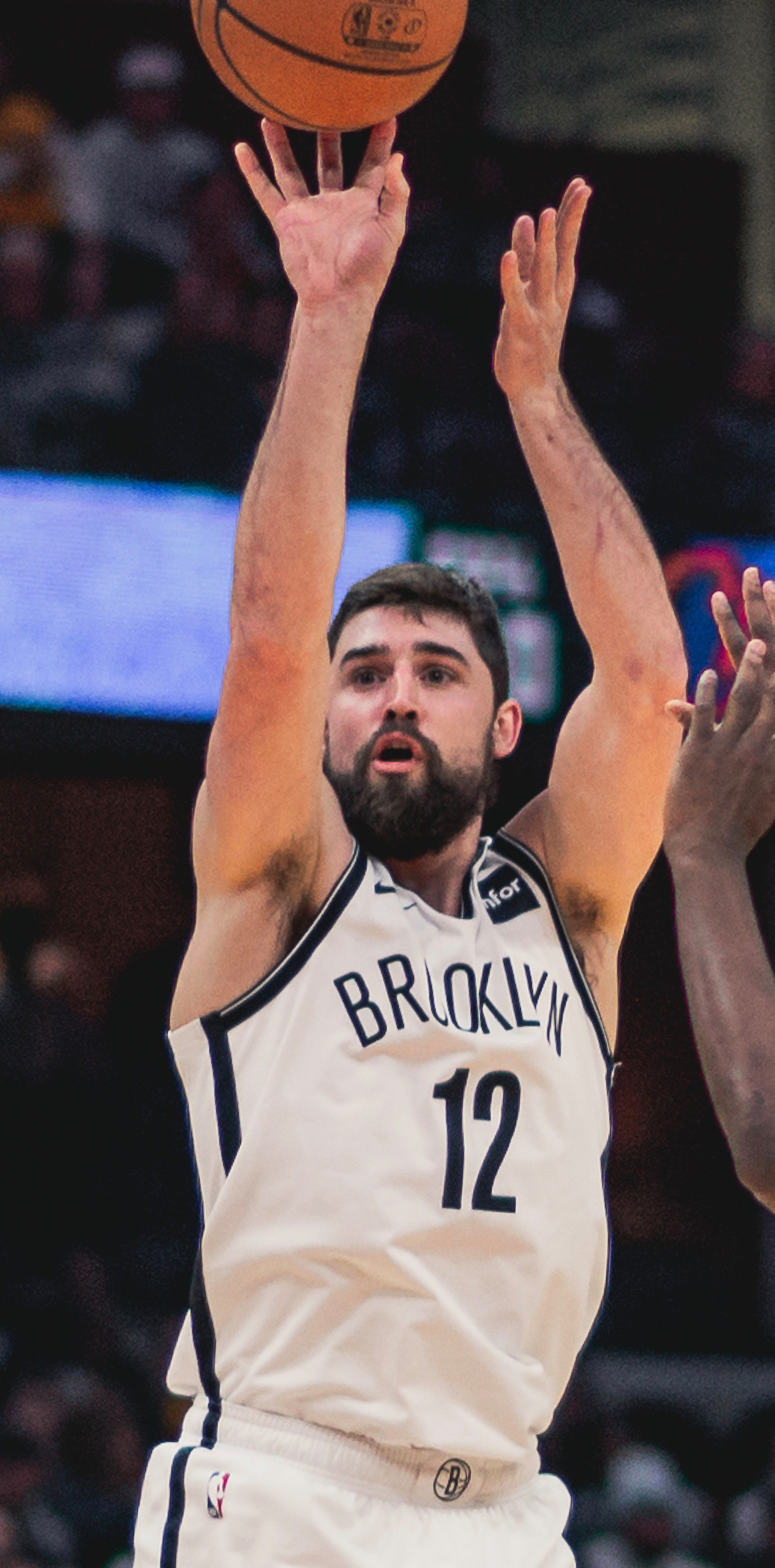
- Harris with the Brooklyn Nets in 2019

Personal information
- Born: September 6, 1991 (age 35) Chelan, Washington, U.S.
- Listed height: 6 ft 6 in (1.98 m)
- Listed weight: 220 lb (100 kg)

Career information
- High school: Chelan (Chelan, Washington)
- College: Virginia (2010–2014)
- NBA draft: 2014: 2nd round, 33rd overall pick
- Drafted by: Cleveland Cavaliers
- Playing career: 2014–2024
- Position: Small forward / shooting guard
- Number: 12, 31

Career history
- 2014–2016: Cleveland Cavaliers
- 2015: →Canton Charge
- 2016–2023: Brooklyn Nets
- 2023–2024: Detroit Pistons

Career highlights
- NBA Three-Point Contest champion (2019); First-team All-ACC (2013); Second-team All-ACC – Coaches (2014); Third-team All-ACC – Media (2014); ACC tournament MVP (2014); Washington Mr. Basketball (2010)
- Stats at NBA.com
- Stats at Basketball Reference

Joseph Malcolm Harris Jr. (born September 6, 1991) is an American former professional basketball player. He played college basketball for the Virginia Cavaliers, before being selected with the 33rd overall pick in the 2014 NBA draft by the Cleveland Cavaliers.

Harris spent one-and-a-half seasons with the Cavaliers before being traded and waived due to injury. He was signed by the Brooklyn Nets in 2016, and became one of just three Nets players in history to make 200 three-pointers in one season. Harris led the NBA in three-point shooting accuracy in 2018–19 and repeated the feat in 2020–21. In 2021, Harris surpassed Dražen Petrović as the Nets' all-time leader in three-point field goal percentage and surpassed Jason Kidd as the Nets' all-time leader in three-point field goals made.

Harris ranked fifth in NBA history for career three-point field goal percentage (minimum 1,000 career three-point field goals made) as of March 2024. Harris played for the Detroit Pistons in his final season before retiring in 2024.

== Early life ==
Harris was born and raised in Chelan, Washington to Joseph "Joe" Harris Sr., who coached the boys' basketball team at Bridgeport High for six years and then Chelan High for 25 years, and was inducted into the Washington Interscholastic Basketball Coaches Association Hall of Fame in 2011, and Alice Harris, who grew up playing softball, volleyball and basketball, and is a broker and director of sales at Coldwell Banker Lake Chelan Properties. Harris started going to his father's basketball practices when he was just four years old. He then volunteered to be the team manager from third to eighth grade. As a child, Harris wrote personal goals and quotes from NBA legends on his bedroom walls and ceiling. One of his goals was to take at least 1,000 shots a day.

== High school career ==
Harris played all four years for the Mountain Goats at Chelan High, where he was coached by his father, Joe.

In his junior year, he averaged 24.7 points, 8.5 rebounds, 4.3 assists and 2.7 steals a game, and led the Mountain Goats to the Class 1A state tournament with a 24–6 record. He was named AP Class 1A Player of the Year and was selected to the Class 1A All-Tournament first team.

In his senior year, Harris led his team to fifth place in the Class 1A state tournament after leading them to a 26–2 record. He averaged 26.6 points, 8.0 rebounds, 4.6 assists, 4.4 steals and 1.6 blocks a game, while shooting 59.2% from the field and 76.5% from the free throw line. He was named Washington Mr. Basketball by the Washington State Coaches Association, and named the Gatorade Washington Player of the Year. For the second straight year, Harris was named the AP Class 1A Player of the Year and selected to the Class 1A All-Tournament first team.

He finished off his high school career with 452 assists, 699 rebounds, 282 steals, and a Class 1A state record 2,399 points.

College recruiting
Name	Hometown	School	Height	Weight	Commit date
Joe Harris; SG	Chelan, WA	Chelan High	6 ft 5 in (1.96 m)	200 lb (91 kg)	Aug 3, 2009
Joe Harris; SG	Recruit ratings: Scout: Rivals: 247Sports: ESPN: (90)				
Overall recruit ranking: Scout: 51 (SG); 19 (school) Rivals: 32 (SG); 119 (national)
Note: In many cases, Scout, Rivals, 247Sports, On3, and ESPN may conflict in their listings of height and weight.; In these cases, the average was taken. ESPN grades are on a 100-point scale.; Sources: "2010 Virginia Basketball Commitment List". Rivals. Archived from the original on February 20, 2017.; "2010 Virginia College Basketball Team Recruiting Prospects". Scout. Archived from the original on February 20, 2017.; "Virginia Cavaliers 2010 Player Commits". ESPN.; "Scout.com Team Recruiting Rankings". Scout.; "2010 Team Ranking". Rivals.

== College career ==
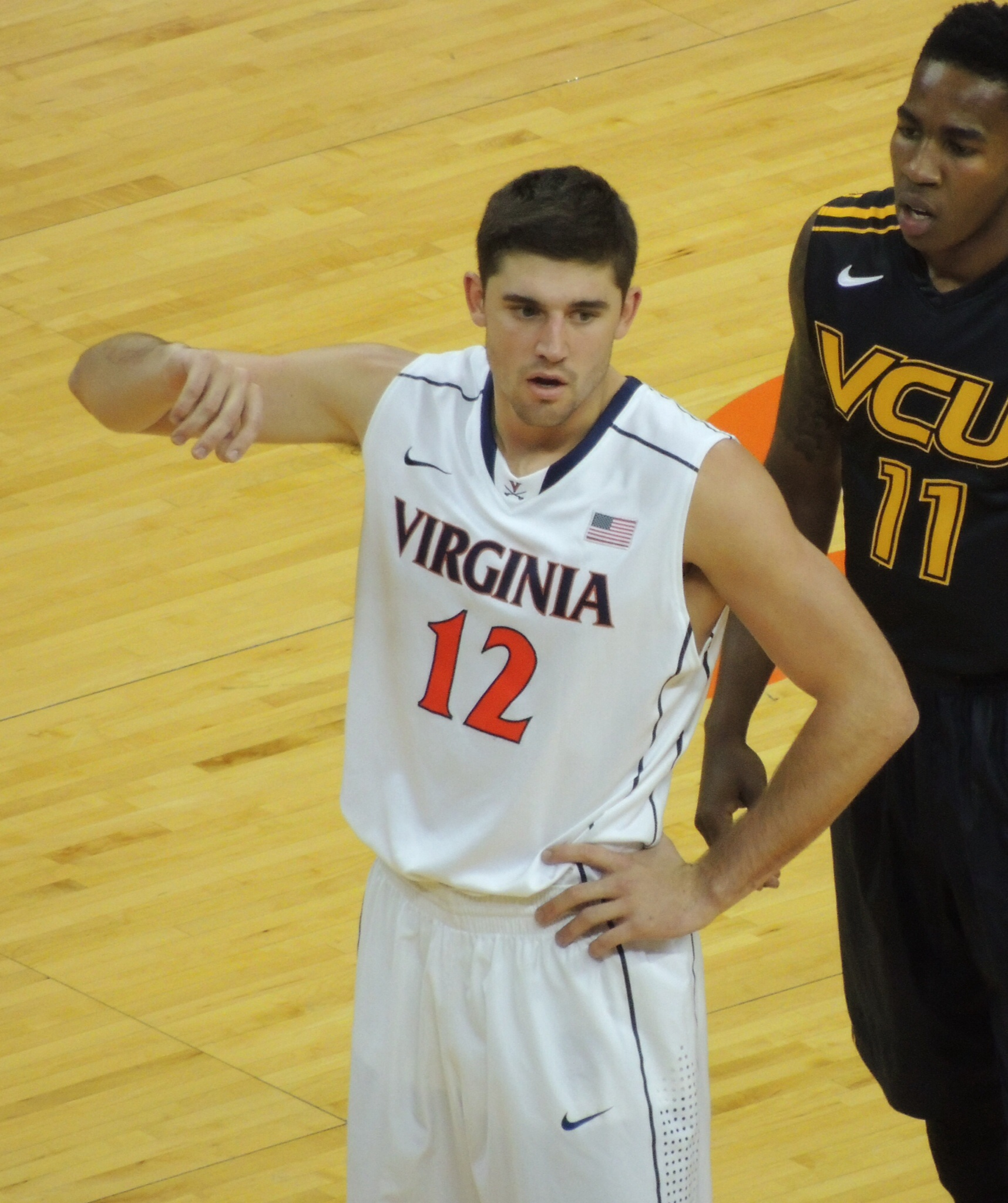
Harris with Virginia in November 2013

Harris was recruited by head coach Tony Bennett, while Bennett was the head coach at Washington State. When Bennett moved to Virginia, Harris switched his commitment to join him there.

=== Freshman season ===
In Harris' collegiate debut for the Virginia Cavaliers, he recorded 2 points, 4 rebounds and 3 assists in a 76–52 win over William & Mary. On November 18, Harris had his first career start for the Cavaliers and scored 12 points in an 81–60 loss against Stanford. At the Maui Invitational tournament, he scored 19 points on 8-of-13 field goals and 7 rebounds in a 106–63 loss against Washington. In 35 minutes of playing time, Harris scored a then-career-high 24 points on 8-of-12 field goals and grabbed 5 rebounds against Minnesota at the 2010 ACC–Big Ten Challenge, winning by 87–79. On January 2, he had a season-high 2 blocks in a 64–50 victory against LSU. Two days later, Harris scored 16 points with a career-high 5 three-pointers made on 5-of-6 attempts in an 84–63 win against Howard. On February 5, Harris played for a career-high 41 minutes and recorded 18 points, 3 rebounds, 2 assists and 3 steals in a 68–70 overtime loss against Miami. On February 26, he grabbed a career-high 10 rebounds against Boston College in a 44–63 loss. On March 1, Harris recorded an ACC career-high 19 points on 4-of-7 three-point attempts, 5 rebounds, 3 assists and 2 steals, leading the Cavaliers to a 69–58 victory against NC State. The Cavaliers lost to Miami in the first round of the 2011 ACC tournament 69–62 in overtime. The Cavaliers finished the season with a 7–9 conference record and a 16–15 overall record.

Harris averaged 29.4 minutes, 4.4 rebounds and 10.4 points per game, and averaged 32.0 minutes, 5.1 rebounds and 11.2 points in the sixteen regular season ACC games. He shot 41.8% from the field, and 41.7% from three-point range (the most by an ACC freshmen since 2000).

=== Sophomore season ===
In the season-opening game against South Carolina State, Harris recorded 13 points, 6 rebounds and 4 assists in a 75–38 win. At the Cavaliers' first of three Paradise Jam tournament games, Harris scored 13 points, grabbed 6 rebounds and gave 3 assists in a 55–57 losing effort against TCU. However, the Cavaliers defeated Drexel and Drake in their second and third games, 49–35 and 60–52, respectively. Harris scored 12 points against the Dragons and 18 points against the Bulldogs. At the 2011 ACC–Big Ten Challenge, he scored 18 points, grabbed 7 rebounds and had a season-high 4 steals against Michigan, winning by 70–58. Harris tied his ACC career-high 19 points and his career-high 5 three-pointers in 65–61 win against Clemson. On February 25, Harris recorded 12 points, 5 rebounds, 3 assists and a career-high 3 blocks against North Carolina in a 51–54 losing effort. The Cavaliers were defeated by NC State, 64–67, in the quarterfinals of the 2012 ACC tournament. Harris helped lead the Cavaliers to the 2012 NCAA tournament, the program's first tournament bid under Bennett and first since 2007. However, they were eliminated by Florida, 45–71, in the second round. The Cavaliers ended their season with a 9–7 conference record and a 22–10 overall record.

Harris fractured a bone in his left hand during a game against North Carolina on February 11. He still played in all of the remaining games of the season, but with a padded wrap wrapped around his hand. He also suffered a concussion in a game against Florida State on March 1, when an opposing player, Bernard James, accidentally elbowed the side of his head. Both men were fighting for the rebound, and both fell to the ground after the aforementioned hit. He was also unintentionally kicked in the stomach when James moved to get up, causing himself to be ejected. Harris was cleared to play in the next game.

Harris upped his scoring to 11.3 per game—second on the team to All-American Mike Scott. He also averaged 30.3 minutes and 3.9 rebounds per game. He shot 44.2% from the field, 38.0% from the three-point range and 77.2% from the free throw line, and was named to the All-State second team.

=== Junior season ===
In the 2012–13 season, Harris became one of the top players in the Atlantic Coast Conference (ACC). He started out the season scoring 19 points, handing out 3 assists and grabbing a season-high 8 rebounds in a 59–63 defeat against George Mason. In the first round of the 2012 NIT Season Tip-Off tournament, Harris recorded 15 points, 3 assists and 7 rebounds in a 54–45 victory against Fairfield. However, Virginia would lose in the second round to Delaware, 53–59. Harris scored 20 points in the losing effort. At the 2012 ACC–Big Ten Challenge, he recorded a game-high 22 points, 5 assists and 5 rebounds in a 60–54 victory against Wisconsin. On December 8, Harris gave a career-high 6 assists in a 67–39 win over Mississippi Valley State. At the Governor's Invitational game, he recorded 18 points, 2 assists, 3 rebounds and 2 steals in a 61–63 loss against Old Dominion. On February 12, he tied his career high of 5 three-pointers and finished with 26 points and 4 rebounds in a 73–55 victory over Virginia Tech. On February 28, Harris scored a career-high 36 points against Mike Krzyzewski's Duke Blue Devils in a 73–68 victory. He led the Cavaliers to an 11–7 conference record and a 23–12 overall record, scoring 16.3 points and collecting 4.0 rebounds per game. He was named first team All-ACC at the conclusion of the season.

=== Senior season ===
Going into his senior season in 2013–14, Harris received significant preseason recognition. He was a member of the preseason All-ACC team and was named to the preseason watch list for the Wooden Award as national player of the year. Harris led the Cavaliers to their first outright ACC regular season title since 1981, their first ACC tournament title since 1976, and their first Sweet Sixteen appearance since 1995. Harris subsequently earned ACC tournament MVP honors, and was named to the All-Tournament team and All-ACC third team.

== Professional career ==
=== Cleveland Cavaliers (2014–2016) ===
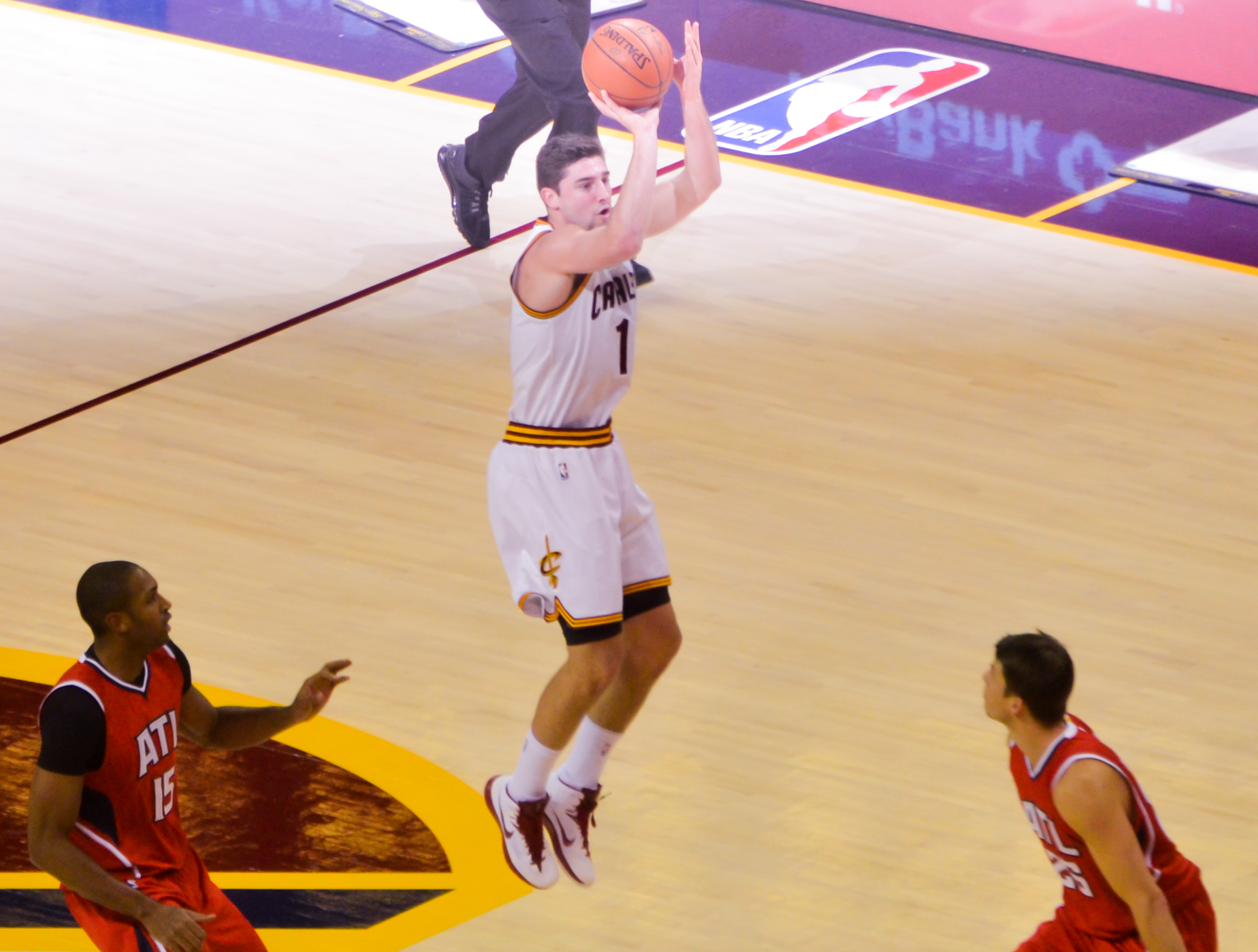
Harris attempting a shot with the Cavaliers in 2014

On June 26, 2014, Harris was selected with the 3rd pick of the second round (33rd overall) by the Cleveland Cavaliers in the 2014 NBA draft. On July 24, he signed his rookie-scale contract with the Cavaliers after averaging 7.8 points, 1.5 rebounds and 1.5 assists during the 2014 NBA Summer League. On November 15, Harris recorded 12 points, 4 assists, 4 rebounds and a steal in a 127–94 win against the Atlanta Hawks. He topped his scoring against the Hawks on December 30, scoring 13 points on 4-of-7 shooting in a 101–109 defeat. Harris received his first career start on January 5, scoring a then-career-high 16 points against the Philadelphia 76ers, losing by 92–95. Due to LeBron James's return and Kevin Love's acquisition, Harris rarely saw minutes and was assigned to the Canton Charge of the NBA Development League (D-League) on January 20. The following day, Harris posted 18 points and 6 rebounds in his D-League debut in a 107–109 double overtime loss to the Delaware 87ers. Harris scored a career-high 26 points against the Maine Red Claws in a 92–104 defeat. On February 6, he scored a game-high 23 points on 6-of-15 field goals including 4 three-pointers in a 102–84 victory over the Sioux Falls Skyforce. In his rookie season, the Cavaliers made it to the 2015 NBA Finals, but they lost to the Golden State Warriors in six games.

On January 5, 2016, Harris underwent season-ending surgery to remove an extra bone in his right foot. A week later, he was traded, along with a 2017 second-round pick and cash considerations, to the Orlando Magic in exchange for a 2020 second-round pick. He was immediately waived by the Magic upon acquisition.

=== Brooklyn Nets (2016–2023) ===
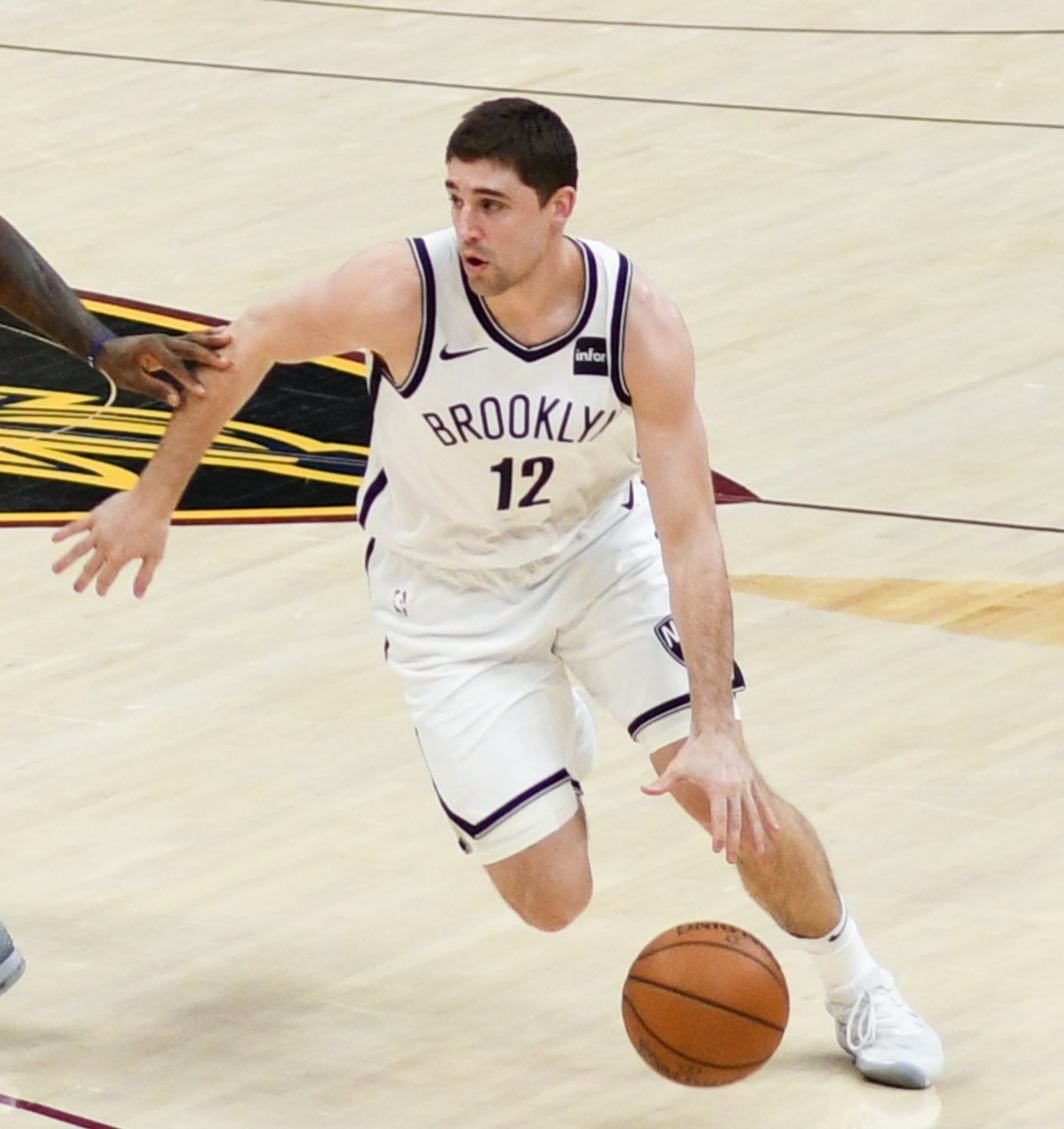
Harris with the Nets in 2018

On July 19, 2016, Harris signed with the Brooklyn Nets. He made his debut for the Nets in their season opener on October 26, 2016, against the Boston Celtics. In 25 minutes off the bench, he scored 16 points on 6-of-15 shooting in a 122–117 loss. On December 18, 2016, he tied his then career high with 19 points in a 108–107 loss to the Philadelphia 76ers. On April 2, 2017, he was ruled out for the rest of the season with a sprained left shoulder.

On December 29, 2017, Harris scored a then-career-high 21 points in a 111–87 win over the Miami Heat. On January 6, 2018, he recorded his first career double-double with 10 points and 12 rebounds in an 87–85 loss to the Boston Celtics. On March 25, 2018, he set a new career high with 30 points in a 121–114 loss to his former team the Cleveland Cavaliers.

On July 24, 2018, Harris re-signed with the Nets. On October 19, 2018, in a 107–105 win over the New York Knicks, Harris' first three-pointer was his 237th as a Net, moving him into 10th place on the franchise's career list. On November 4, in a 122–97 win over the 76ers, Harris made a three-pointer in his 25th straight game, moving into sole possession of fourth place on the Nets' career list. On December 23, in a 111–103 win over the Phoenix Suns, Harris made 3 three-pointers, making him the first player in franchise history to make three or more in six straight games. On December 26, he scored a season-high 27 points and made a game-winning layup with 3.4 seconds left in the second overtime to lift the Nets to a 134–132 win over the Charlotte Hornets. On February 11, 2019, he scored 24 points and made a career-best 7 three-pointers in a 127–125 loss to the Toronto Raptors. On February 16, he won the Three-Point Contest during All-Star weekend. In the playoffs, he shot 4-of-21 from 3-point range over five games.

On November 23, 2020, Harris re-signed with the Nets. On January 31, 2021, Harris made a career-high 8 three-pointers in a 149–146 loss to the Washington Wizards. On February 19, Harris set a franchise record as the fastest player to knock down 100 three-pointers in a season with 31 games played, surpassing the previous record accomplished by four players with 41 games. The Nets won the first series of the playoffs against the Boston Celtics, but were beaten in seven by the Milwaukee Bucks.

During a 93–106 loss to the Miami Heat on October 27, 2021, Harris became the franchise leader in career three-pointers, surpassing the 813 made by Jason Kidd for the Nets. On November 14, during a 120–96 win over the Oklahoma City Thunder, Harris suffered a left ankle injury. He underwent arthroscopic surgery on November 29 and was ruled out for at least 4-to-8 weeks. On March 3, 2022, Harris planned to undergo second ankle surgery and was ruled out for the remainder of the 2021–22 season. On March 21, he underwent the surgery, which was a left ankle ligament reconstruction.

=== Detroit Pistons (2023–2024) ===
On July 6, 2023, Harris was traded to the Detroit Pistons, alongside two second-round draft picks, in exchange for cash considerations. He made 16 appearances for the Pistons during the 2023–24 season, recording averages of 2.4 points, 0.8 rebounds, and 0.6 assists. Harris was waived by Detroit on February 8, 2024.

On August 15, 2024, Harris retired from professional basketball.

== Career statistics ==
Legend
GP	Games played	GS	Games started	MPG	Minutes per game
FG%	Field goal percentage	3P%	3-point field goal percentage	FT%	Free throw percentage
RPG	Rebounds per game	APG	Assists per game	SPG	Steals per game
BPG	Blocks per game	PPG	Points per game	**Bold**	Career high
*	Led the league

=== NBA ===
==== Regular season ====
Year	Team	GP	GS	MPG	FG%	3P%	FT%	RPG	APG	SPG	BPG	PPG
2014–15	Cleveland	51	1	9.7	.400	.369	.600	.8	.5	.1	.0	2.7
2015–16	Cleveland	5	0	3.0	.250	.250	—	.6	.4	.0	.0	.6
2016–17	Brooklyn	52	11	21.9	.425	.385	.714	2.8	1.0	.6	.2	8.2
2017–18	Brooklyn	**78**	14	25.3	.491	.419	.827	3.3	1.6	.4	**.3**	10.8
2018–19	Brooklyn	76	**76**	30.2	.500	.474*	.827	3.8	**2.4**	.5	.2	13.7
2019–20	Brooklyn	69	69	30.8	.486	.424	.719	**4.3**	2.1	.6	.2	**14.5**
2020–21	Brooklyn	69	65	**31.0**	**.505**	**.475***	.778	3.6	1.9	**.7**	.2	14.1
2021–22	Brooklyn	14	14	30.2	.452	.466	**.833**	4.0	1.0	.5	.1	11.3
2022–23	Brooklyn	74	33	20.6	.457	.426	.643	2.2	1.4	.5	.2	7.6
2023–24	Detroit	16	0	10.6	.359	.333	.500	.8	.6	.2	.1	2.4
Career		504	283	24.4	.479	.436	.771	3.0	1.6	.5	.2	10.3

==== Playoffs ====
Year	Team	GP	GS	MPG	FG%	3P%	FT%	RPG	APG	SPG	BPG	PPG
2015	Cleveland	6	0	2.7	.333	.333	.750	.2	.2	.0	.0	1.3
2019	Brooklyn	5	5	29.8	.372	.190	**1.000**	4.2	.6	**.6**	.0	8.8
2020	Brooklyn	2	2	36.0	**.522**	**.583**	.500	**10.0**	1.0	.5	.0	**16.5**
2021	Brooklyn	**12**	**12**	**36.2**	.398	.402	.750	3.6	**1.6**	.3	**.2**	11.2
2023	Brooklyn	4	0	10.9	.154	.083	**1.000**	1.3	.0	.5	.0	1.8
Career		29	19	24.7	.389	.354	.818	3.1	.9	.3	.1	7.8

=== College ===
Year	Team	GP	GS	MPG	FG%	3P%	FT%	RPG	APG	SPG	BPG	PPG
2010–11	Virginia	31	25	29.4	.418	.417	.759	**4.4**	1.3	.9	.4	10.4
2011–12	Virginia	32	31	30.3	.442	.380	**.772**	3.9	1.7	.7	.4	11.3
2012–13	Virginia	35	35	**32.5**	**.468**	**.425**	.740	4.0	2.2	.9	**.5**	**16.3**
2013–14	Virginia	**37**	**37**	28.8	.441	.400	.640	3.0	**2.3**	**1.0**	.2	12.0
Career		135	128	30.3	.442	.406	.728	3.8	1.9	.9	.4	12.5

== Personal life ==
Harris has three sisters: his older sister, Kaiti, and his younger sisters, Jaicee and Mackenzie. Kaiti played college basketball at Yakima Valley College and Warner Pacific College, Jaicee played volleyball at Washington State, and Mackenzie played volleyball at Chelan High.

Harris is good friends with former Cleveland Cavaliers teammate Matthew Dellavedova.

Harris wore a fluorescent green band around his left wrist in memory of his late cousin, Tricia Haerling.

Since 2015, Harris has held the Joe Harris Basketball Camp for kindergartners to eighth-graders every summer at Chelan High School.

Harris is a member of the "Starting Five", along with Malcolm Brogdon, Justin Anderson, Anthony Tolliver and Garrett Temple. Their goal was to raise $225,000 through Hoops2O, founded by Brogdon, to fund five wells in East Africa by the end of the 2018–19 season. Harris traveled with Brogdon and Anderson to Tanzania to witness the opening of the first well they funded in July 2019, and by November, Hoops2O had raised nearly $400,000. By February 2020, the charity had funded the construction of ten wells in Tanzania and Kenya, bringing water to over 52,000 citizens.

== See also ==
- List of NBA career 3-point field goal percentage leaders
