= Tolton High School =

High school in Columbia, Missouri, US

Father Tolton Catholic High School

Location
- 3351 East Gans Road; Columbia, Missouri 65201; United States; 38°53′34″N 92°17′23″W

Information
- Type: Private college-preparatory school
- Motto: Follow not the well worn path. Go instead where there is no path and blaze a trail.
- Religious affiliation: Roman Catholic
- Established: 2011; 15 years ago
- Principal: Daniel Everret
- Teaching staff: 21
- Grades: 9–12
- Gender: Co-educational
- Enrollment: approx. 360
- Houses: Gonzaga, Maximillian, Blaise, Ethelbert, Xavier, Sebastian
- Colors: White and Columbia blue
- Athletics conference: Archdiocesan Athletic Association
- Mascot: Gus
- Nickname: Trailblazers
- Tuition: $10,269 for Catholic families $12,805 for others
- Website: toltoncatholic.org

Father Augustine Tolton Regional Catholic High School is the first private, Catholic high school in Columbia, Missouri, built in 2010. It is located in the Diocese of Jefferson City. The school is named after Missouri native Augustus Tolton, the first self-identified black Catholic priest in the United States. The school's enrollment for the 2026–27 school year was approx. 360 students.

== History ==
Talk of opening a Catholic high school in Columbia had become a serious conversation by the time Bishop John R. Gaydos arrived in the Diocese Jefferson City in 1997. In a 2001 statement of his vision for the local Church, he called for “a study of how to expand the possibilities for Catholic secondary education in the diocese". Feasibility studies indicated strong support among Catholic parishioners in Columbia and surrounding communities for opening a Catholic high school.

Local parishioners wanted the new high school to be built on a foundation of Catholic spirituality, college-prep academics, and leadership-development opportunities for students. They helped their parishes pay down construction debts, which allowed fund-raising for the new school to begin in earnest. The Diocese of Jefferson City provided $1.5 million in seed money through the “Grateful Memories … Faithful Future” capital campaign in 2006 and Bishop John Gaydos authorized the purchase of 23 acres of real estate.

A fund drive to raise an additional $5 million in pledges in 2009 allowed the executive committee to secure financing for the rest of the school's cost. Bishop Gaydos authorized initial site work and excavation for the school to begin in April of that year. The first classes started in August 2011 and the building opened in November 2011.

Additional funds were being raised with the hope of keeping tuition affordable for as many children as possible. As of December 2019, however, the school held a debt of $6.2M, said to be related to the cost of constructing the school.

== Campus ==
Tolton High School is located on the south side of Columbia off of U.S. Route 63 on East Gans Road. The campus sits adjacent to A. Perry Philips Park, an outdoor recreation area and lake.

== Athletics ==
Tolton is a full member of the Missouri State High School Activities Association (MSHSAA), and its team compete as the Trailblazers. As of the conclusion of the 2025–26 school year, Tolton has won 15 MSHSAA state championships across nine different sports.

- Baseball (1): 2022
- Boys' basketball (1): 2016
- Boys' cross country (2): 2020, 2022
- Girls' cross country (3): 2021, 2022, 2023
- Boys' golf (1): 2022
- Girls' soccer (1): 2023
- Softball (3): 2020, 2024, 2025
- Boys' track and field (1): 2021
- Girls' track and field (2): 2015, 2016

== Notable alumni ==
- Jevon Porter, basketball player
- Jontay Porter, college basketball player for the Missouri Tigers, former professional for the NBA team Toronto Raptors
- Michael Porter Jr., college basketball player for the Missouri Tigers, professional for the NBA team Denver Nuggets
