= Chelan High School =

Public school in Washington, United States

Location
- 215 West Webster Ave., PO Box 369, Chelan, Washington 98816
- Coordinates: 47.8350°N 120.0207°W

Information
- Type: Public
- Established: 1892
- Principal: Brad Wilson
- Teaching staff: 25.06 (FTE)
- Grades: 9–12
- Enrollment: 439 (2024-2025)
- Student to teacher ratio: 17.52
- Campus: Rural Mountain
- Colors: Green, White & Grey
- Athletics: WIAA Division 1A
- Athletics conference: Caribou Trail
- Mascot: Mountain Goat
- Rivals: Cascade, Cashmere, Omak
- Website: www.chelanschools.org/Domain/8

Chelan High School is a small rural public high school located in Chelan, Washington. It is located within the Cascade Mountains, lying on the edge of the North Cascades National Park and the Wenatchee National Forest. Chelan High School has an approximate enrollment of 415 students in grades 9–12. The school's mascot is the Mountain Goats, and the school colors are Green, White and Red.

== Athletics ==
Chelan High School's mascot is the Mountain Goats and their school colors are Green, White and Grey. Chelan is a member of the Washington Interscholastic Activities Association and competes in the 1A Caribou Trail Conference. The Caribou Trail Conference consists of Chelan High School, Cascade High School, Cashmere High School, and Omak High School. The school participates in 14 sports, which are listed below.

Fall Sports	Winter Sports	Spring Sports
Football	Boys' Basketball	Baseball
Girls' Soccer	Girls' Basketball	Softball
Golf	Wrestling	Tennis
Cheerleading	Winter Track	Track & Field
Cross Country	Cheerleading	Boys' Soccer
Volleyball		

== Notable alumni ==
- Steve Kline - Class of 1966, former Major League Baseball player
- Joe Harris - Class of 2010, former professional NBA player for the Brooklyn Nets, former basketball player for the University of Virginia, led university to first ACC regular season title since 1981, and named 2014 ACC tournament MVP.
