= Michael Porter Jr. =

American basketball player (born 1998)

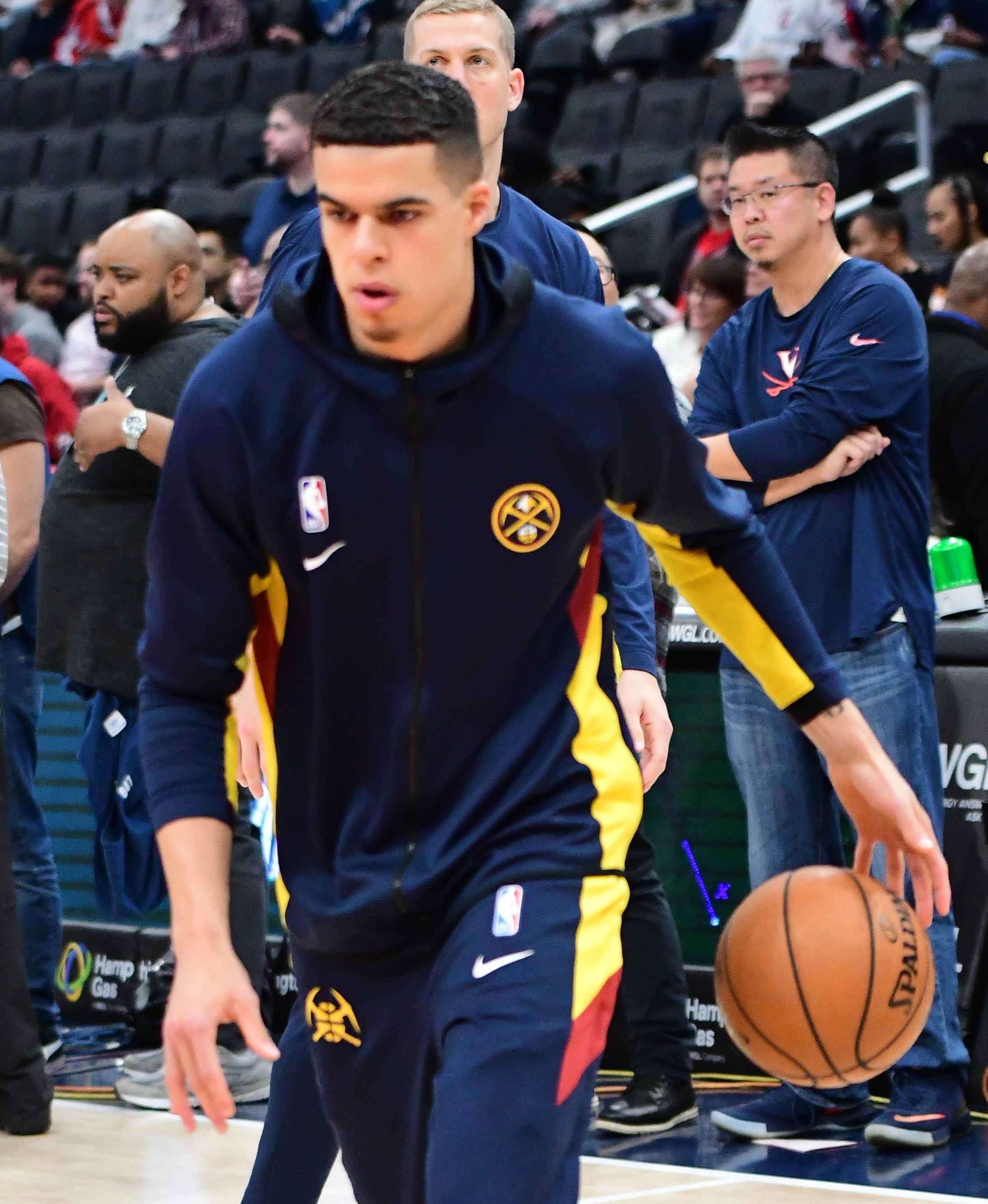
- Porter with the Denver Nuggets in 2020

No. 17 – Brooklyn Nets
- Position: Small forward
- League: NBA

Personal information
- Born: June 29, 1998 (age 28) Indianapolis, Indiana, U.S.
- Listed height: 6 ft 10 in (2.08 m)
- Listed weight: 232 lb (105 kg)

Career information
- High school: Father Tolton (Columbia, Missouri); Nathan Hale (Seattle, Washington)
- College: Missouri (2017–2018)
- NBA draft: 2018: 1st round, 14th overall pick
- Drafted by: Denver Nuggets
- Playing career: 2018–present

Career history
- 2018–2025: Denver Nuggets
- 2025–present: Brooklyn Nets

Career highlights
- NBA champion (2023); National high school player of the year (2017); McDonald's All-American MVP (2017); Washington Mr. Basketball (2017)
- Stats at NBA.com
- Stats at Basketball Reference
Medals
Men's basketball
Representing the United States
FIBA Americas U18 Championship
Gold medal – first place	2016 Chile	National team

Michael Lamar Porter Jr. (born June 29, 1998), also known as "MPJ", is an American professional basketball player for the Brooklyn Nets of the National Basketball Association (NBA). He played college basketball for the Missouri Tigers. Porter was ranked as one of the top prospects in the class of 2017. He was selected 14th overall by the Denver Nuggets in the 2018 NBA draft, winning his first NBA championship with them in 2023. After six seasons with Denver, Porter was traded to the Nets in 2025.

== Early life ==
Porter attended Father Tolton Regional Catholic High School in Columbia, Missouri, before transferring to Nathan Hale High School in Seattle, Washington, for his senior year. His father, Michael Porter Sr., was hired by the University of Washington to be an assistant coach; former NBA player Brandon Roy was the coach of Nathan Hale's basketball team.

In Porter's junior season at Father Tolton, he led the team to the 3A State Championship. In the 2016 summer, Porter joined Mokan Elite on the Nike Elite Youth Basketball League (EYBL) averaging 26.2 points and 11.5 rebounds per game leading them to the Nike EYBL Peach Jam championship and was named Co-MVP alongside teammate and future NBA player Trae Young.

In his senior season, Porter averaged 36.2 points and 13.6 rebounds as he helped his high school team earn a perfect 29–0 record and win the Washington Class 3A State Championship. He recorded 52 points and 23 rebounds in a blowout victory over Seattle Prep on senior night. Porter was rated as a five-star recruit and ranked as one of the top overall recruits in his class by Rivals.com and ESPN.

On March 29, 2017, Porter was named MVP at the McDonald's All-American Game leading the West in a 109–107 win over the East team. Porter also participated in the 2017 Nike Hoop Summit, leading Team USA to a 98–87 victory over the World Select Team with 19 points in 23 minutes of play.

College recruiting
Name	Hometown	School	Height	Weight	Commit date
Michael Porter Jr. SF	Columbia, MO	Nathan Hale High School (WA)	6 ft 9 in (2.06 m)	210 lb (95 kg)	Mar 24, 2017
Michael Porter Jr. SF	Recruit ratings: Scout: Rivals: 247Sports: ESPN: (97)				
Overall recruit ranking: Scout: 2 Rivals: 1 ESPN: 2
Note: In many cases, Scout, Rivals, 247Sports, On3, and ESPN may conflict in their listings of height and weight.; In these cases, the average was taken. ESPN grades are on a 100-point scale.; Sources:

== College career ==
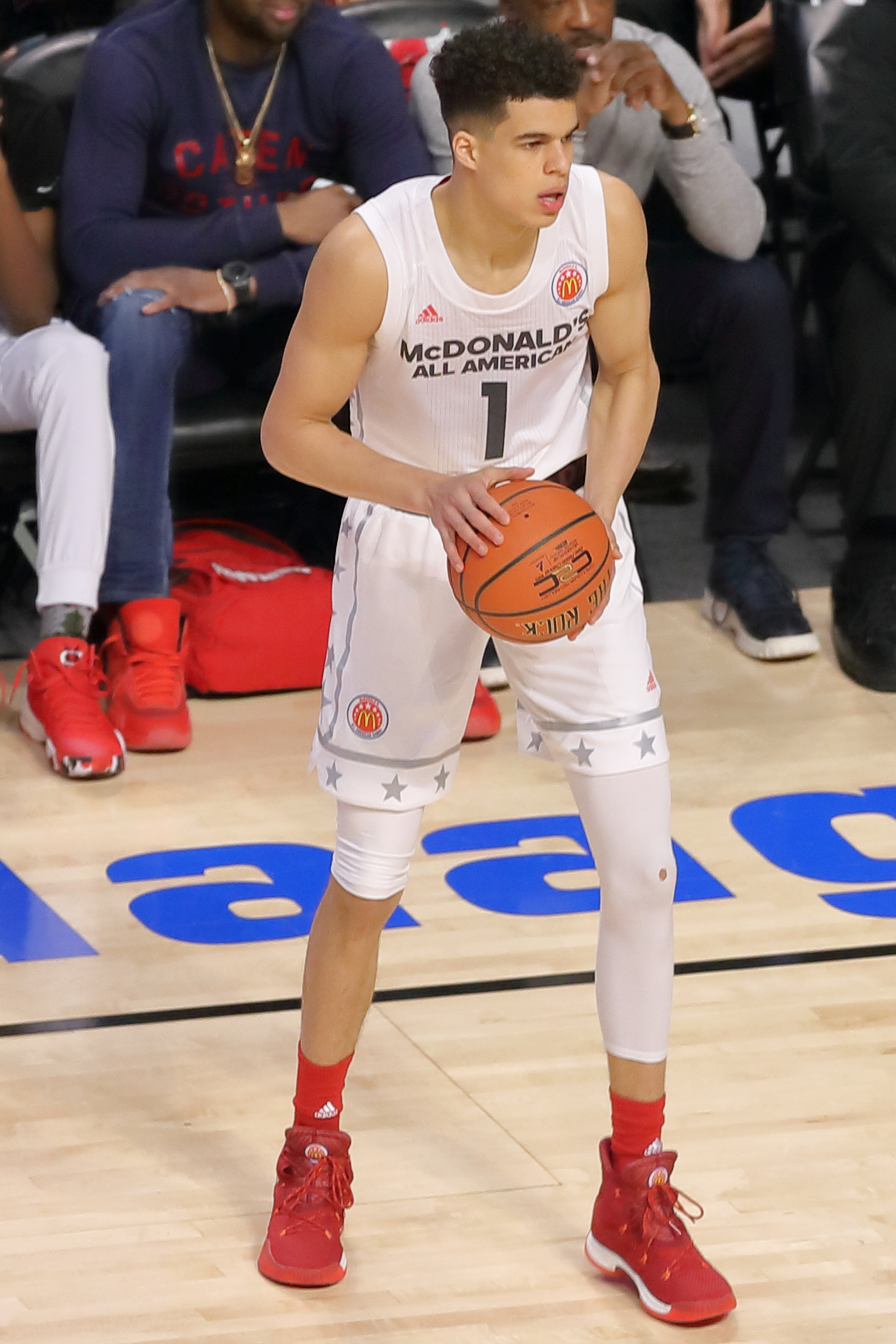
Porter at the 2017 McDonald's All-American Boys Game

In July 2016, Porter originally committed to Washington. After Lorenzo Romar was fired as Washington's head coach, Porter Sr. was hired as an assistant coach for the University of Missouri. Porter Jr. later decommitted from Washington.

On March 24, 2017, Porter committed to play for Missouri, joining his father and his younger brother, Jontay Porter (who reclassified from the class of 2018).

Porter was injured in the first half of the season opener against Iowa State. Porter was expected to miss the remainder of the 2017–18 season because of a lower back injury which required surgery. On November 22, 2017, Porter had a successful microdiscectomy of his L3-L4 spinal discs. On February 22, 2018, Porter Jr. was cleared to practice with Missouri again, with the potential to return to play before the end of the season. NBA executives were encouraging him to play if he was feeling healthy enough to do so.

Porter would officially return to action on March 8, 2018, in the quarterfinals of the SEC tournament. Porter would also play in the first round of the 2018 NCAA Division I men's basketball tournament, where the team lost to Florida State. In both games, however, Porter came off the bench to play instead of starting as he had on opening night, mainly as a precaution. On March 27, Porter announced his intention to forgo his final three seasons of collegiate eligibility and declared for the 2018 NBA draft.

== Professional career ==
=== Denver Nuggets (2018–2025) ===
Porter was selected with the 14th overall pick by the Denver Nuggets in the 2018 NBA draft. He fell from a possible first overall pick to the 14th pick with the Nuggets due to reports regarding his health. The Nuggets also discussed the possibility of having him sit out for his entire first season in the NBA in relation to his back problems. On July 3, 2018, Porter signed a multi-year contract with the Nuggets. On July 19, 2018, the Nuggets announced that Porter had undergone a second back surgery and subsequently missed the entire season.

On October 31, 2019, Porter made his debut in the NBA, coming off the bench with fifteen points, four rebounds, and an assist in a 107–122 loss to the New Orleans Pelicans. On December 29, he made his first career start in the NBA, finishing with 19 points, along with six rebounds and an assist in 26 minutes in a 120–115 win over the Sacramento Kings. He set a new career high with 25 points in 23 minutes just four days later in a win against the Indiana Pacers. On August 4, 2020, returning from the suspension of the season due to the COVID-19 pandemic, Porter Jr. led the Nuggets to their first victory in the Orlando bubble, scoring a then career-high 37 points in route to a 121–113 overtime win over Oklahoma City Thunder.

On April 24, 2021, Porter scored a career-high 39 points in a 129–116 win over the Houston Rockets.

On September 27, 2021, Porter and the Denver Nuggets agreed to a 5-year, $172 million rookie extension that will become $207 million if Porter is selected to an All-NBA Team. He was expected to be the secondary scoring option behind Nikola Jokić while Jamal Murray continued to recover from a torn ACL. On November 29, 2021, having appeared in only 9 games, Porter's agent Mark Bartelstein announced Porter would miss the remainder of the 2021–22 NBA season as he would be undergoing a third back surgery.

In Game 5 of the 2023 NBA Finals, Porter put up 16 points and 13 rebounds in a 94–89 win over the Miami Heat to help the Nuggets win their first NBA championship in franchise history.

On March 21, 2024, Porter put up 31 points along with his 193rd made three-pointer of the season, surpassing the previous record of 192 set by Dale Ellis for the most made three-pointers in a season in Nuggets franchise history.

On November 10, 2024, Porter scored 17 points and hit the game-winning jumper in a 122–120 victory over the Dallas Mavericks.

On February 3, 2025, Porter had 36 points in a 125–113 win over the New Orleans Pelicans. On February 5, Porter put up a career-high-tying 39 points, alongside 12 rebounds, in a 144–119 win over the New Orleans Pelicans. The next day, Porter scored 30 points in 112–90 win over the Orlando Magic. He became the first player in Nuggets history to record three straight games of 30+ points and 5+ three-pointers.

=== Brooklyn Nets (2025–present) ===
On July 8, 2025, Porter and a 2032 first-round draft pick were traded to the Brooklyn Nets in exchange for Cameron Johnson. He started 52 contests for Brooklyn during the 2025–26 NBA season, recording averages of 24.2 points, 7.1 rebounds, and 3.0 assists (all career-highs). On April 3, 2026, Porter was ruled out for the remainder of the season due to ankle and hamstring injuries. Porter became eligible for a contract extension on July 6, 2026, and general manager Sean Marks said the team would take a patient approach to negotiations while expressing confidence in Porter's future with the team.

== Career statistics ==
Legend
GP	Games played	GS	Games started	MPG	Minutes per game
FG%	Field goal percentage	3P%	3-point field goal percentage	FT%	Free throw percentage
RPG	Rebounds per game	APG	Assists per game	SPG	Steals per game
BPG	Blocks per game	PPG	Points per game	**Bold**	Career high
†	Won an NBA championship

=== NBA ===
==== Regular season ====
Year	Team	GP	GS	MPG	FG%	3P%	FT%	RPG	APG	SPG	BPG	PPG
2019–20	Denver	55	8	16.4	.509	.422	.833	4.7	.8	.5	.5	9.3
2020–21	Denver	61	54	31.3	**.542**	**.445**	.791	**7.3**	1.1	.7	**.9**	19.0
2021–22	Denver	9	9	29.5	.359	.208	.556	6.6	1.9	**1.1**	.2	9.9
2022–23^{†}	Denver	62	62	29.0	.487	.414	.800	5.5	1.0	.6	.5	17.4
2023–24	Denver	**81**	**81**	31.7	.484	.397	.836	7.0	1.5	.5	.7	16.7
2024–25	Denver	77	77	**33.7**	.504	.395	.768	7.0	2.1	.6	.5	18.2
2025–26	Brooklyn	52	52	32.5	.463	.363	**.859**	7.1	**3.0**	**1.1**	.3	**24.2**
Career		397	343	29.5	.493	.398	.812	6.5	1.6	.7	.5	17.3

==== Playoffs ====
Year	Team	GP	GS	MPG	FG%	3P%	FT%	RPG	APG	SPG	BPG	PPG
2020	Denver	19	3	23.7	**.476**	.382	.743	6.7	.8	.7	.3	11.4
2021	Denver	10	10	33.2	.474	.397	**.810**	6.2	1.3	**1.1**	.3	**17.4**
2023^{†}	Denver	**20**	**20**	32.6	.423	.351	.793	**8.1**	**1.6**	.5	.6	13.4
2024	Denver	12	12	**36.9**	.466	**.407**	.769	6.8	1.1	.9	**.8**	15.8
2025	Denver	14	14	31.1	.392	.343	.714	5.5	.6	.6	.4	9.1
Career		75	59	30.9	.446	.374	.768	6.8	1.1	.7	.5	13.0

=== College ===
Year	Team	GP	GS	MPG	FG%	3P%	FT%	RPG	APG	SPG	BPG	PPG
2017–18	Missouri	3	1	17.7	.333	.300	.778	6.7	.3	1.0	.3	10.0

== Personal life ==
Porter is a Christian. He grew up as a vegetarian. In 2018, he changed his diet to raw vegan. As of 2020, Porter is no longer vegetarian or vegan.

In addition to younger brother Jontay, he has two older sisters named Bri and Cierra, along with four younger siblings. In April 2024, his younger brother Coban was sentenced to six years in prison for killing a woman while driving under the influence of alcohol. Also in April 2024, another younger brother of Porter, Jevon, was arrested in Missouri on suspicion of DWI. All three of Porter's brothers also played basketball on at least a collegiate level as well, with Jontay playing with Michael in Missouri during his freshman season, Coban previously playing in the University of Denver, and Jevon currently playing for the University of Missouri, after previously playing for Loyola Marymount University and Pepperdine University.

In 2016, Porter began dating actress and model Madison Pettis. The two were in a relationship until mid-2017. Ten years following their relationship, Pettis spoke on their relationship together, stating that before the NBA, Porter was a "psychopath".

In 2021, Porter started his podcast, named Curious Mike, where on the podcast, he brings in different NBA players and talks about various topics ranging from the league to life.

On September 10, 2023, while visiting Taiwan, Porter threw out the first pitch at a CTBC Brothers game.

== See also ==
- List of NBA career 3-point field goal percentage leaders
- List of NBA single-season 3-point scoring leaders
