= Rainier Beach High School =

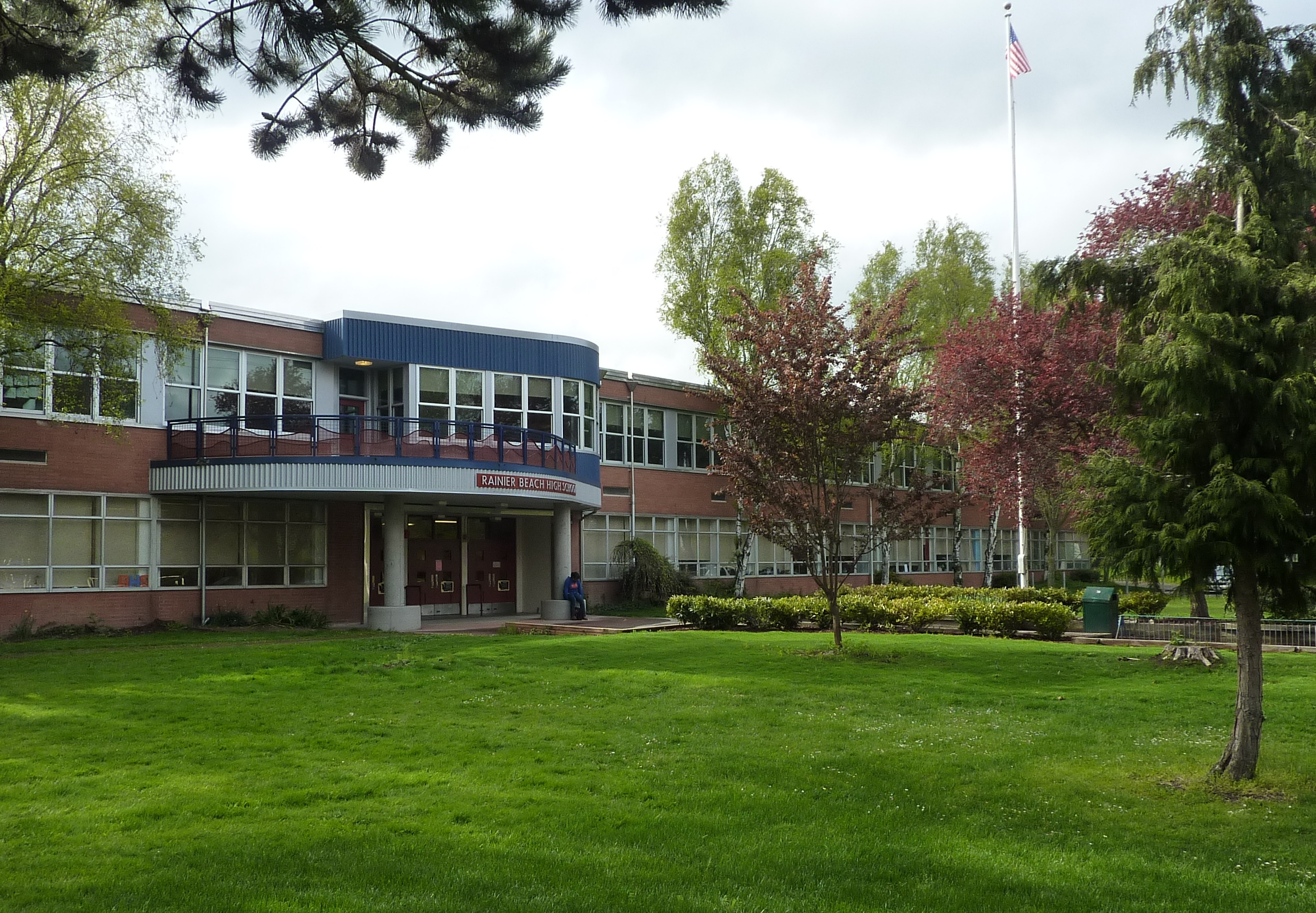

Location
- 8815 Seward Park Avenue South; Seattle, Washington 98118; United States; 47°31′28″N 122°16′00″W

Information
- Type: Public High School
- Principal: Annie Patu
- Staff: 46.00 (FTE)
- Enrollment: 765 (2023–2024)
- Student to teacher ratio: 16.63
- Colors: Blue & Orange
- Mascot: Vikings
- Website: rainierbeachhs.seattleschools.org

Rainier Beach High School is a public high school within the Seattle Public Schools system. It is located in the Rainier Beach neighborhood, in the southeastern part of Seattle, Washington, United States. Historically, the school has emphasized team sports and has produced many championship teams. The building has a capacity of 1,200 students, but enrollment has declined significantly in recent years. In 2006, 1,302 of the 1,600 high school students living in the Rainier Beach neighborhood traveled outside the area each morning to attend other high schools. During the 2008–09 school year, Rainier Beach began with 453 students and ended with about 295, resulting in an average monthly enrollment of 374. Only sixty students chose it as their first choice. In 2013, the school introduced an International Baccalaureate program.

== Academics ==
- Advanced Placement classes are offered in mathematics, statistics, language arts, history/politics, music theory, and studio art. In 2008–09, 15% of Rainier Beach students took at least one AP class (about 75 students). Of these, 10% passed the AP exams (about 7 or 8 students).
- Spanish and Mandarin Chinese are offered as foreign languages.
- In 2009, over 61% of 10th grade students passed the state reading test, 17.6% passed the math test, and 6% met minimum standards in all three basic subjects - reading, writing and math. In 2009, 9.8% passed the science test, up from 3% in 2006.
- On average, 76% of enrolled students attend school on any given day. Of the class of 2009, 64.2% of entering freshmen, and 86% of entering senior class members eventually graduated.
- 2010 57% of Graduating Class went on to 2yr or 4yr Colleges or Universities. In fall 2010, 12 students from the 2010 graduating class enrolled at the University of Washington.

== Athletics ==
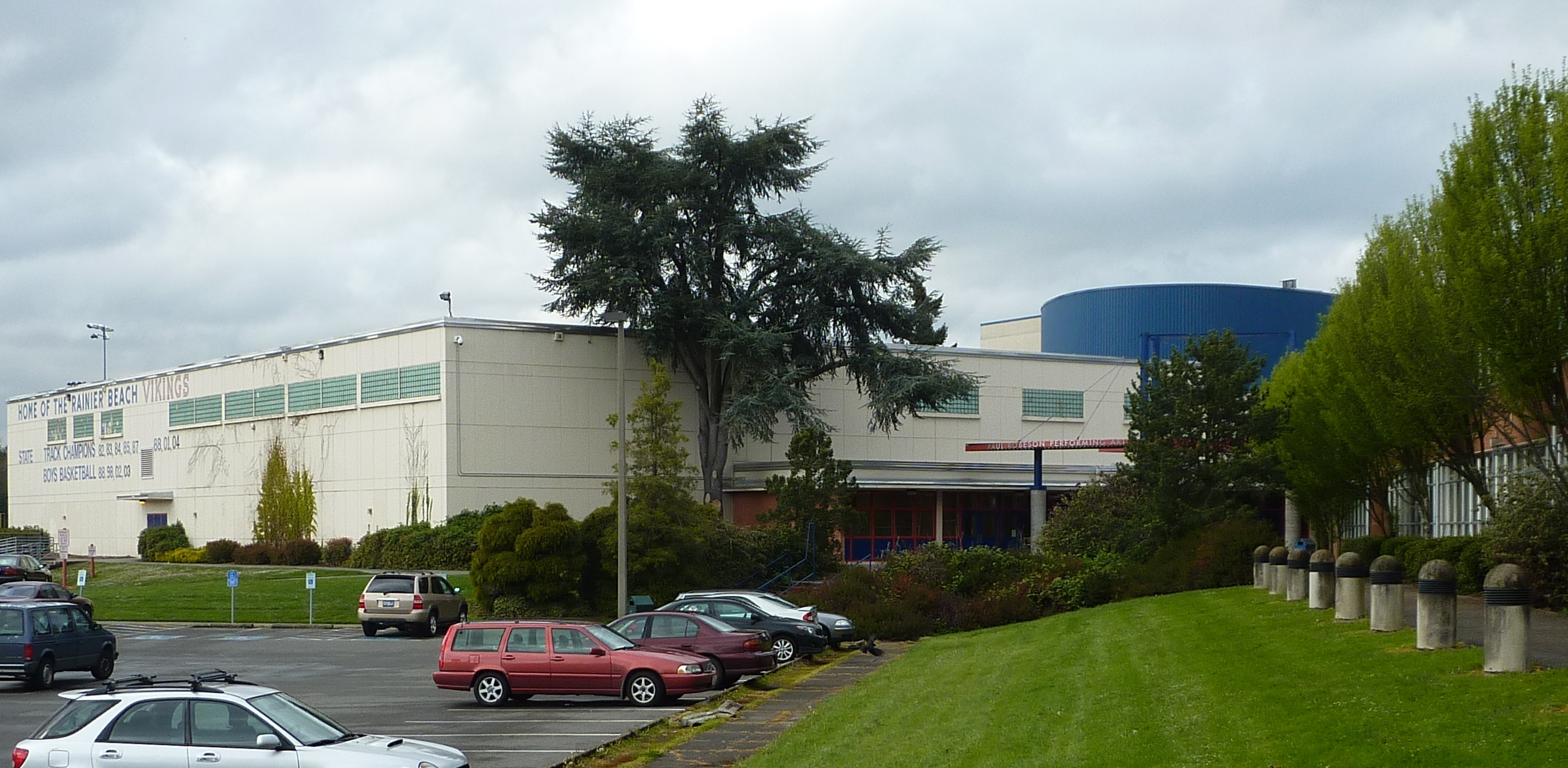
The side facing the athletic fields as seen from the street to the south.

Rainier Beach High School is a member of the Metro League, part of Sea-King District 2 and the Washington Interscholastic Activities Association.

In 2002, Rainier Beach's men's basketball team was ranked number 1 in the country for a brief time. Rainier Beach has won the basketball state championship nine times: 1988, 1998, 2002, 2003, 2008, 2012, 2013, 2014, and 2016.

Rainier Beach High School State Championship Games; WIAA State Tournament History, inquire by selecting Rainier Beach HS
| Year | Sport | Winning Team/1st Place | | Losing Team/2nd Place | | Location | Class |
| 1982 | Men's Track & Field | Edmonds-Woodway High School | 65 | Rainier Beach | 42 | Lincoln Bowl | 3A |
| 1986 | Men's Track & Field | Rainier Beach | 81 | Bellingham High School (Washington) | 44 | Lincoln Bowl | 3A |
| 1987 | Men's Track & Field | Rainier Beach | 72 | Stanwood High School | 30 | Lincoln Bowl | 3A |
| 1988 | Women's Basketball | Rainier Beach | 63 | Bainbridge High School (Washington) | 46 | Tacoma Dome | 3A |
| 1988 | Men's Basketball | Rainier Beach | 65 | Sequim High School | 53 | Tacoma Dome | 3A |
| 1989 | Women's Basketball | Rainier Beach | 59 | Lakeside School | 50 | Tacoma Dome | 3A |
| 1997 | Men's Track & Field | Ellensburg High School | 41 | Rainier Beach | 39 | Lincoln Bowl | 3A |
| 1998 | Men's Basketball | Rainier Beach | 44 | Olympia High School (Washington) | 40 | Kingdome | 3A |
| 2001 | Men's Basketball | Mount Vernon High School (Washington) | 65 | Rainier Beach | 52 | Tacoma Dome | 3A |
| 2002 | Men's Basketball | Rainier Beach | 67 | Mercer Island High School | 51 | Tacoma Dome | 3A |
| 2003 | Men's Basketball | Rainier Beach | 65 | Issaquah High School | 56 | Tacoma Dome | 3A |
| 2004 | Women's Basketball | Meadowdale High School | 66 | Rainier Beach | 53 | Tacoma Dome | 3A |
| 2004 | Men's Basketball | O'Dea High School | 68 | Rainier Beach | 64 (2OT) | Tacoma Dome | 3A |
| 2008 | Men's Basketball | Rainier Beach | 53 | Lakes High School | 45 | Hec Edmundson Pavilion | 3A |
| 2012 | Men's Basketball | Rainier Beach | 61 | Seattle Preparatory School | 58 | Tacoma Dome | 3A |
| 2013 | Men's Basketball | Rainier Beach | 62 | Lakeside | 59 (OT) | Tacoma Dome | 3A |
| 2014 | Men's Basketball | Rainier Beach | 47 | Eastside Catholic | 45 | Tacoma Dome | 3A |
| 2015 | Men's Basketball | Garfield High School | 66 | Rainier Beach | 51 | Tacoma Dome | 3A |
| 2016 | Men's Basketball | Rainier Beach | 70 | O'Dea High School | 49 | Tacoma Dome | 3A |
| 2017 | Football | O'Dea High School | 38 | Rainier Beach | 11 | Tacoma Dome | 3A |
| 2018 | Men's Basketball | Garfield High School | 72 | Rainier Beach | 63 (OT) | Tacoma Dome | 3A |

== Demographics ==
As of October 2007, 59.8% of enrolled students were African American, 24.4% were Asian, 9.4% were Hispanic, 5% were White and 1.4% were Native American. Of the 361 students, 61.8% qualify for free or reduced lunch. These demographics reflect the neighborhood itself. In October 2009, 70.6% of students were eligible for free or reduced price meals.

== Student life ==
Rainier Beach started as a combined Middle and High School, the increased volume of students created the need to separate the two types of schools. Staff has been honored with the local Golden Apple awards. 2 Parents and leaders of the PTSA have been honored at the White House. 3 Along with program recognition (1998 Golden Apple Teaching Academy winner) a tight knit community which supports and develops close knit community relationships. 4 Much of the stigma of the Rainier Valley is often placed on the school, however the academics and the student successes are often overlooked. Rainier Beach is trying to share their view of the school with their new approach, "The New Beach." Promotion of their academic success is the new focus. 5 RBHS is in a troubled section of the city, and many incidents occurring in the area are automatically assumed to be caused by gang-affiliated young men, including Rainier Beach and South Lake Alternative High School students. Students come from many ethnic cultures within the neighborhood, and often from difficult socio-economic backgrounds. Sometimes the realities of society outside the school enter into school life. One recent example emerged in this newspaper story. Another larger incident erupted on the school grounds during the summer.

== Performing Arts magnet school plan ==
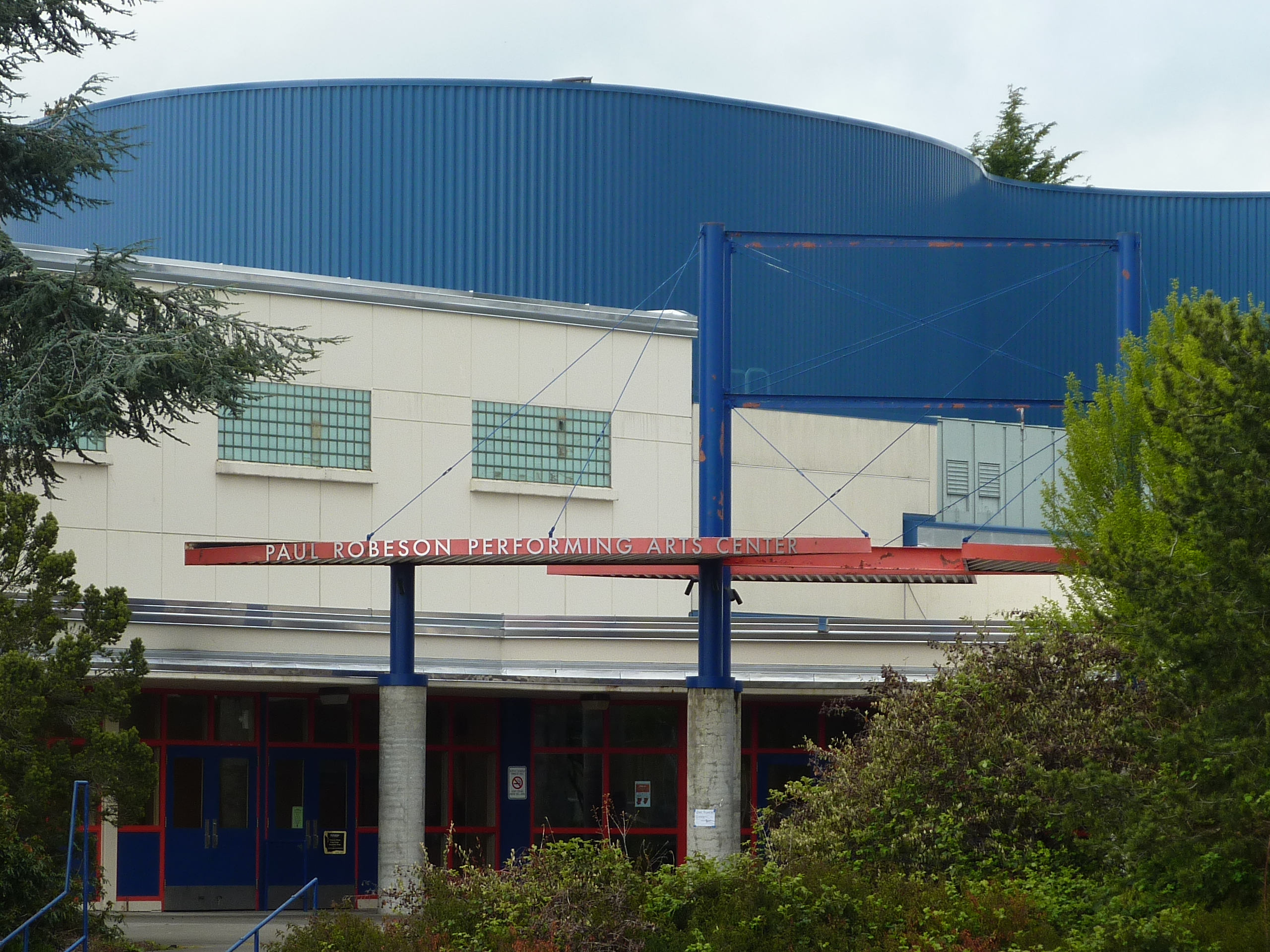
Paul Robeson Performing Arts Center entry

A large performing arts center was built on the campus in 1998, when Rainier Beach was to become a performing arts magnet school. Federal funding for the magnet plan, and the plan itself, ended after three years. Little used for years, the hall, now called the Paul Robeson Performing Arts Center, began hosting community theater productions in 2007. Rainier Beach now offers special programs in partnership with several theater troupes in the Rainier Beach High School Theater Coalition.

== Principal controversy ==
During the 1990s, controversy grew at Rainier Beach as the school's academics worsened and enrollment declined. After years of complaints to the central administration, parents began picketing the school in 1999. They staged weekly demonstrations against principal Marta Cano-Hinz, who had led the school since 1993, demanding that the district fire her and turn Rainier Beach around. In January, 2000 Cano-Hinz announced that she would step down at the end of the school year. Later that year, the school district disclosed that it had paid $173,507 to induce her to resign.

In September 2010, the school district appointed an academic co-principal, Lisa Escobar.

== Improved academic standards ==
In the fall of 2005, the school district ended its practice of promoting high school students to the next grade even if they didn't pass their classes. The new policy required students to earn five credits in order to move to the next grade. In early 2006, before the 10th grade WASL test, nearly half of Rainier Beach's sophomores were reclassified as freshmen."It was a wake-up call," said new Rainier Beach principal Robert Gary, Jr.

In 2007, Rainier Beach sophomores met AYP (Annual Yearly Progress) due to an afterschool program funded by Nate Robinson.

== Technology Access Foundation proposals ==
The Technology Access Foundation was invited to become a part of the Rainier Beach School in late 2006, but was met with a great deal of controversy regarding the possibility of a TAF takeover of the school. The foundation's co-founder Trish Millines Dziko outlined a proposal for how such a program would work, but despite administrative support, teachers and students were unhappy with the proposal. One of the major points for the opposition was TAF's ability to hire and fire teachers as they saw fit under the terms of the proposal. In addition, teachers and students felt like the proposal was a push to make Rainier Beach into a charter school. Supporters meanwhile, believed that it would create more incentives for people to enroll in the school, something that had been an issue for years. In the end, the proposal was rejected by the school board.

== Proposed closure ==
In December, 2008 Superintendent Goodloe-Johnson proposed closing Rainier Beach High School and merging its students into Cleveland High School. Parents were not enthusiastic about the merger. Alumni from past decades recalled Rainier Beach's prior success in preparing students for college, and demanded that the district restore the school academically instead of closing it. Others were concerned that students' opposing gang affiliations in the two neighborhoods would cause violent clashes. One week later, the Superintendent canceled the merger proposal.

== Southeast Initiative ==
The Southeast Initiative was a three-year plan, from 2007 to 2009, to "[e]nsure that local secondary schools are the 'schools of choice' for residents in southeast Seattle..." The plan targeted Rainier Beach High School, Cleveland High School, and Aki Kurose Middle School. First approved in June, 2007, the district expanded the plan in 2008 and proposed to increase spending on it to $7.9 million. In 2007–08, the Initiative's first year, 17.3% of Rainier Beach students chose the school as their first choice. In the third year, 2009–10, only 12.8% chose it. Rainier Beach High School's WASL reading test pass rates declined from 70.0% in 2007 to 61.5% in 2009. Rainier Beach's math pass rates declined from 37.4% in 2007 to 17.6% in 2009. While some measures improved, many others remained more or less the same. In 2010, about four fifths of students living in Rainier Beach's enrollment area continue to enroll at other high schools, often in far away districts in the city.

== International Baccalaureate ==
The school district, in the fall of 2010, discussed starting an International Baccalaureate program at Rainier Beach, in addition to the IB programs at Ingraham High School and Chief Sealth International High School. The plan was approved and classes began the fall of 2013. The IB Diploma program has been instituted.

== State designation as low achieving, eligibility for federal grant ==
On January 13, 2011, Washington State designated Rainier Beach High School as persistently low achieving. On the same day, Seattle Public Schools announced that the designation qualified the school for remedial federal funds and that it intended to apply for a federal school improvement grant for Rainier Beach. To receive the improvement grant, the district had to either close the school, replace the principal and at least half the faculty, or "transform" the school in several prescribed ways. Superintendent Goodloe-Johnson announced that she would reassign the current co-principals and appoint a new principal at Rainier Beach.

== Notable alumni ==
- Ryan Anderson, basketball player
- MarJon Beauchamp, basketball player
- Michael Berry, sprinter
- Nissim Black, rapper
- Doug Christie, basketball player
- Josh Conerly Jr., football player
- Ginnie Crawford, hurdler
- Jamal Crawford, basketball player
- Rosell Ellis, basketball player
- C. J. Giles, basketball player
- Phil Heath, bodybuilder
- Nate Kalepo, football player
- Katie Maloney, rower
- Dejounte Murray, basketball player
- Saul Patu, football player
- Trent Pollard, football player
- Kevin Porter Jr., basketball player
- Nate Robinson, basketball player
- Lodrick Stewart, basketball player
- Tyran Stokes, basketball player
- Alameda Ta'amu, football player
- Terrence Williams, basketball player
