= Nathan Hale High School (Washington) =

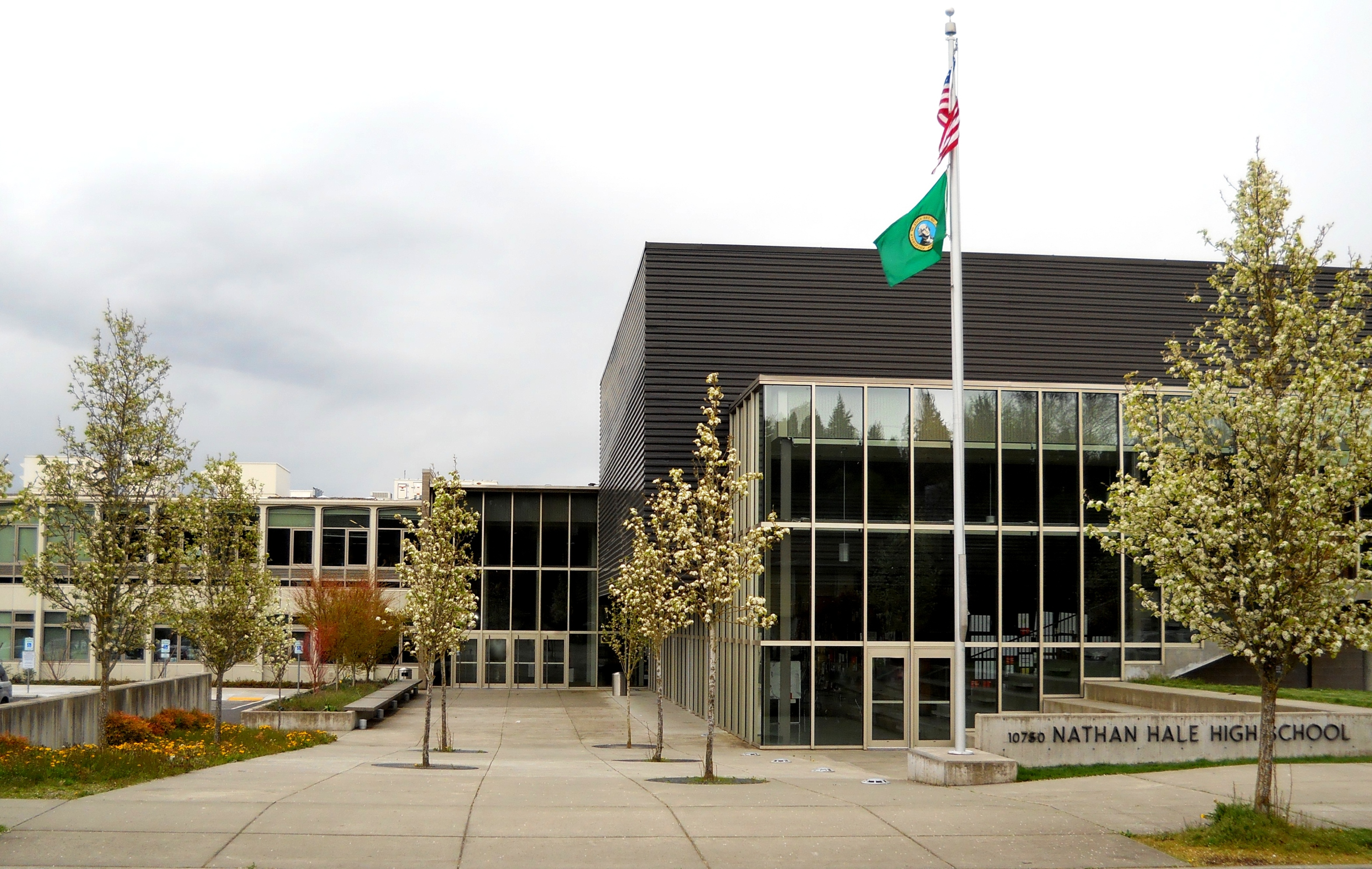

Location
- 10750 30th Avenue Northeast; Seattle, Washington 98125; United States; 47°42′27″N 122°17′40″W

Information
- Type: Public
- Motto: Ensuring that all students become honorable, skillful, thinking, global citizens
- Opened: 1963
- School district: Seattle Public Schools
- Principal: Jolene Grimes
- Teaching staff: 52.10 (on an FTE basis)
- Grades: 9-12
- Enrollment: 1,052 (2024–2025)
- Student to teacher ratio: 20.19
- Colors: Red, White, & Blue
- Athletics: Metro League
- Mascot: Raiders
- Rivals: Ingraham, Roosevelt
- Newspaper: Sentinel
- Yearbook: Heritage
- Website: halehs.seattleschools.org

Nathan Hale High School is a public high school in Seattle, Washington, United States, operated by Seattle Public Schools. It was a member of the Coalition of Essential Schools and uses a project-based learning curriculum.

== History ==
The land where Nathan Hale High School is located today was previously occupied by the Fisher Dairy Farm and later the Meadowbrook Golf Course. At that time, Jane Addams was the only secondary school in the area and was part of the Shoreline School District. Nathan Hale High School opened in 1963 with 1,206 students, all sophomores and juniors, and grew to 2,400 students across three grades by the end of the decade.

In 1969, unknown individuals painted a Raider on the school's smokestack in the middle of the night.

The school radio station, KNHC (for "Nathan Hale Communications"), was founded in 1971.

A learning resource center was added in 1972 using bond funds.

The first greenhouse was built in 1973 to house horticulture classes. Carpentry students built a newer solar greenhouse in 1982–83, near a sewer plant that was later redeveloped into Meadowbrook Pond in the late 1990s.

Nathan Hale's enrollment dropped dramatically after the district-wide 1978 desegregation plan closed or reassigned many of its feeder schools.

The school began admitting ninth graders in 1979.

By the late 1980s, the school's reputation was suffering. In 1996 the Seattle Times described the school as having a "historically bad reputation". This changed by the early 2000s, with the help of Principal Eric Benson. Under his guidance, Hale transformed into the most desirable high school in the district, with the longest waitlist.

New sports fields were added in 2000 and a new performing arts center was completed in 2005, hosting a free concert by Rihanna a few months later. In 2008, Lady Gaga performed a concert in the performing arts center.

=== Renovations ===
The original building underwent a major renovation between 2009 and 2011 as part of Bex III. 75% of the school was rebuilt, and a new library and synthetic turf football field were added. The new building was designed with CES principles in mind, and won an AIA National Award in 2014. The old smokestack was demolished during the renovation, but part of it was saved and moved to the south entrance in 2013.

In 2015, the old greenhouses were demolished to make way for redevelopment of Thornton Creek. A new greenhouse was opened behind Jane Addams Middle School in 2016.

=== Controversies ===
==== Antisemitic harassment ====
In 2025, a lawsuit was filed by the parents of a former Nathan Hale High School student alleging that Seattle Public Schools (SPS) failed to protect her from months of severe antisemitic harassment during the 2023–2024 school year.

According to the court complaint, after the October 7, 2023 Hamas-Israel conflict, the Jewish student was subjected to repeated antisemitic slurs. The harassment reportedly culminated on May 22, 2024, when around 20 students allegedly surrounded the girl’s classroom, pounding on the door and shouting antisemitic threats until a teacher locked her inside and security escorted her to safety.

The suit asserts that school administrators, including then-Principal Dr. William Jackson and Vice-Principal Makela Steward-Monroe, were repeatedly informed of the harassment but failed to take adequate action, and that the student withdrew from school for her safety, missing the final month of the school year, and later transferred to a different district. She was also diagnosed with post-traumatic stress disorder.

In response, members of the Jewish community and the Jewish Community Relations Council met with the school to advocate for anti-bias training. The lawsuit was later withdrawn, but refiled in United States District Court for the Western District of Washington on November 20, 2025.

A second lawsuit, by a different Jewish student, was filed in 2026.

== Programs and facilities ==
Ninth grade academies were created at Nathan Hale in the 1998-99 school year. They organized students into block classes with a reduced student-teacher ratio in health, science, language arts, and social studies. Beginning with the 2018–19 school year, tenth graders took block classes in humanities, art, biology, and career/technical education. Starting in the 2023-24 school year, the academies ended, becoming a regular six-period schedule for the ninth graders.

Seniors complete a year-long Hale Action Project as a graduation requirement.

Nathan Hale has a 17,000 square foot performing arts center, and its sports facilities include a football field, two gyms, and a weight room. Students use Jane Addams Middle School's soccer fields, and swimming classes meet at the Meadowbrook Pool. Nathan Hale has hosted a vocational horticulture program since the 1970s, offering school year and summer classes through Seattle Skills Center.

== Student activities ==
Nathan Hale is home to student-run radio station KNHC.

The school's journalism class produces the Sentinel, the school newspaper, which won first place with special merit from the National Scholastic Press Association in 1999.

Music performance ensembles at Nathan Hale include Jazz band, Vocal Jazz, Concert Orchestra, Chamber Orchestra, Concert Choir and Wind Ensemble. The theater department produces an annual fall play and spring musical.

Bilingual students belonging to the Hale Ambassadors program attend school events to orient families and provide translation.

== Community partnerships ==
Nathan Hale High School has a Teen Health Center run by Kaiser Permanente that provides free care to students.

Nathan Hale works with neighboring Jane Addams Middle School to improve the transition from middle school to high school for students.

== Sports ==
Nathan Hale is a member of the Washington Interscholastic Activities Association (WIAA). The school has been in the second largest classification, known as 3A, since the 1984–85 school year. It was previously in the largest classification. The Raiders are a member of the Metro League and Sea-King District.

The school supports 16 WIAA activities, including baseball, boys' and girls' basketball, cheer, cross country, football, golf, gymnastics, boys' and girls' soccer, softball, coed swimming, tennis, track and field, volleyball, and wrestling. Three non-WIAA sanctioned sports are also fielded: boys' lacrosse, girls' lacrosse, and ultimate. The boys' lacrosse team was founded in 1992, making Hale the first public high school in Seattle to have a field lacrosse team.

In 2016, former NBA star Brandon Roy was hired as the head basketball coach, and top recruit Michael Porter Jr., as well as his brothers Jontay and Coban, transferred to the school when their father, Michael Porter Sr., became the assistant coach at the University of Washington. This led to the school becoming nationally relevant, including a national #1 ranking on maxpreps.com. The basketball team completed the 2016–17 season undefeated, defeating Garfield High School 68–51 in the class-3A state championship game in Tacoma, Washington. That season the boys' basketball team traveled to Oregon to play in the Les Schwab Invitational, which they won.

The girls' ultimate team were national champions in 2018.

== Notable alumni ==
=== Athletics ===
- Emily Boyd - former goalkeeper for the Chicago Red Stars of the NWSL
- Lynn Colella - U.S. Olympic swimmer and silver medalist
- Rick Colella - two-time U.S. Olympic swimmer and bronze medalist
- Paul Dade - former Major League Baseball player
- Craig Driver - first base coach for the Miami Marlins, former bullpen catcher for the Philadelphia Phillies
- Rick Fehr - former PGA Tour golfer
- Cheryl Glass - first female African-American racing driver in the United States
- Jordan Malloch - two-time U.S. Olympic sprint canoer
- Jontay Porter - former NBA player for the Memphis Grizzlies and Toronto Raptors; received lifetime ban from NBA in 2024 for gambling
- Michael Porter Jr. - former Gatorade Player of the Year, first round NBA draft pick, currently plays for the Brooklyn Nets
- Brian Schmetzer - head coach of Seattle Sounders FC
- Ed Simmons - former tackle for Washington Commanders; played 11 seasons, winning two Super Bowls; named one of 70 greatest Commanders of all time
- Masai Ujiri - former president of basketball operations and general manager of the Toronto Raptors in the National Basketball Association.

=== Other ===
- Luke Burbank - host of the podcast TBTL and radio show Ross & Burbank
- Walt Crowley - local historian and co-creator of the website HistoryLink
- Macklemore - hip-hop artist, real name Ben Haggerty
- Casey Sander - actor, played Wade Swoboda in Grace Under Fire
- Sol - hip-hop artist
- Hari Sreenivasan - PBS NewsHour anchor
- Dan Strauss - city councilmember
