= Jontay Porter =

American basketball player (born 1999)

Seattle Super Hawks
- Position: Power forward / center
- League: USBL

Personal information
- Born: November 15, 1999 (age 27) Columbia, Missouri, U.S.
- Listed height: 6 ft 10 in (2.08 m)
- Listed weight: 240 lb (109 kg)

Career information
- High school: Father Tolton (Columbia, Missouri); Nathan Hale (Seattle, Washington)
- College: Missouri (2017–2019)
- NBA draft: 2019: undrafted
- Playing career: 2020–present

Career history
- 2020–2021: Memphis Grizzlies
- 2021: →Memphis Hustle
- 2022–2023: Wisconsin Herd
- 2023: Motor City Cruise
- 2023–2024: Toronto Raptors
- 2023–2024: →Raptors 905
- 2026–present: Seattle Super Hawks

Career highlights
- USBL champion (2026); SEC Sixth Man of the Year (2018); SEC All-Freshman Team (2018)
- Stats at NBA.com
- Stats at Basketball Reference

Jontay Porter (/ˈdʒɒnteɪ/ JON-tay; born November 15, 1999) is an American professional basketball player for the Seattle Super Hawks of the USBL.

Porter played college basketball for the Missouri Tigers where he played alongside his older brother, Michael Porter Jr. He was awarded as the Southeastern Conference Sixth Man of the Year during his freshman season. Porter was an early entrant in the 2019 NBA draft but went unselected, and started his professional career in 2020 on a two-way contract with the Memphis Grizzlies and spent time with their NBA G League affiliate Memphis Hustle. He sat out the 2021–22 season after he was waived by Memphis. Porter joined the Wisconsin Herd of the G League for the 2022–23 season, and after starting the 2023–24 season with the G League's Motor City Cruise, Porter was signed by the Toronto Raptors on a two-way contract with the Raptors 905.

Porter was banned for life by the National Basketball Association (NBA) in 2024 for violating their gambling policies while playing for the Toronto Raptors. The scandal resulted in him facing criminal charges, for which he pled guilty.

== High school career ==
Much like his older brother Michael, Porter started out his high school career playing for Father Tolton Regional Catholic High School in their home town of Columbia, Missouri. In his freshman year, he averaged 11.8 points and 7.8 rebounds per game for Father Tolton before being a key figure in helping them win the Missouri Class 3 State Championship for the first time during his sophomore season. In his junior year of high school, Porter and Michael, along with their younger brother Coban, moved to Seattle, Washington, after his father earned an assistant coaching job at the University of Washington for their basketball team. During Porter's and Michael's time at Nathan Hale High School, the brothers were coached by former NBA All-Star Brandon Roy, who helped lead the squad to a perfect 29–0 record and the Washington Class 3A State Championship. Under the coaching of Roy, Porter averaged a double-double of 14.3 points and 13.6 rebounds per game for Nathan Hale High School, thus earning a name for himself alongside his older brother.

Porter was previously a recruit under the Class of 2018, with him being ranked as high as 11th overall by ESPN at one point. However, after his father was hired as an assistant coach for the University of Missouri, his older brother changed his commitment from the University of Washington to his hometown University of Missouri, and Brandon Roy changed coaching positions from Nathan Hale to Garfield High School, Porter reclassified himself into the Class of 2017 alongside his brother, joining his family out at the University of Missouri. Between his time preparing for his transfer from high school into college, Porter grew two more inches, thus allowing him to play as a power forward, with center being a viable possibility as well.

=== Recruiting ===
College recruiting
| Name | Hometown | School | Height | Weight | Commit date |
|---|---|---|---|---|---|
| Jontay Porter; PF | Columbia, MO | Nathan Hale (WA) | 6 ft 10 in (2.08 m) | 240 lb (110 kg) | May 22, 2017 |
| Jontay Porter; PF | Recruit ratings: Rivals: 247Sports: ESPN: (92) | | | | |
Overall recruit ranking: Rivals: 25 ESPN: 25
Note: In many cases, Scout, Rivals, 247Sports, On3, and ESPN may conflict in their listings of height and weight.; In these cases, the average was taken. ESPN grades are on a 100-point scale.; Sources:

== College career ==
Porter, five days before his 18th birthday, made his season debut on November 10, 2017, in a 74–59 win over Iowa State University. Three days after his debut, he recorded 11 points and 8 rebounds in a blowout 99–55 win over Wagner College. One week later, Porter recorded his first collegiate double-double with 11 points and 11 rebounds in a 67–62 win over Emporia State University. On January 10, 2018, Porter made his first start of the season for Missouri, recording a double-double of 15 points and 10 rebounds in a 68–56 win over the University of Georgia. Porter continued starting for the team during the next five games before returning to the bench for the rest of the season. On February 27, Porter scored a season-high 24 points to go with a team-leading 7 rebounds and 6 assists in a 74–66 win over Vanderbilt University. In his last game of the season, he started for Missouri in the NCAA Tournament. On April 5, Porter announced he would enter the 2018 NBA draft alongside his brother. However, unlike Michael Porter Jr., he entered the draft without hiring an agent first, thus allowing him the possibility to return to Missouri for another year if he was willing to do so. On the May 30 draft day deadline, Porter decided to return to Missouri instead of entering the NBA Draft early where he was seen as a likely first round pick, possibly joining his brother Michael in the lottery had he stayed in. Porter was seen as potential lottery pick for the 2019 NBA draft.

On October 21, 2018, it was announced that Porter would miss his sophomore season after tearing both the ACL and MCL in his right knee during a scrimmage. While rehabilitating, Porter tore his ACL again on March 23, 2019. Despite the injury and Porter's stock plummeting, Porter entered his name for the 2019 NBA draft as one of 233 early-entrant participants. Porter was also one of 66 original participants included in the 2019 NBA Draft Combine. 89 players removed their names from draft consideration at the May 30 deadline, but Porter chose to remain eligible in the 2019 NBA draft's entry pool. After his injuries, Porter was seen as a late first round or second round pick.

== Professional career ==
=== Memphis Grizzlies (2020–2021) ===
Porter was not chosen in the 2019 NBA draft, partially due to teams wary of his injury history. On March 8, 2020, Porter signed with the Memphis Grizzlies. During his rookie season's free agency period, Porter was reported to have been granted access to a VIP account on FanDuel due to him already having a habit of Wall Street day trading and cryptocurrency investments, though this would not come to light until 2025. On November 22, 2020, the Memphis Grizzlies announced that they had re-signed Porter, this time to a multi-year contract. On July 30, 2021, he was waived by the Grizzlies after making 11 appearances. Porter joined the Denver Nuggets for the 2022 NBA Summer League.

=== Wisconsin Herd (2022–2023) ===
On November 3, 2022, Porter was named to the opening night roster of the Wisconsin Herd, the G League team affiliated with the Milwaukee Bucks.

=== Motor City Cruise (2023) ===
On October 2, 2023, Porter signed with the Detroit Pistons, but was waived on October 21. Nine days later, he joined the Pistons' G League affiliate, the Motor City Cruise.

=== Toronto Raptors / Raptors 905 (2023–2024) ===
On December 9, 2023, Porter signed a two-way contract with the Toronto Raptors. He averaged 4.4 points, 3.2 rebounds and 2.3 assists in 26 games played.

=== Gambling charges and ban from NBA ===
On March 25, 2024, ESPN reported that the NBA had opened an investigation of Porter for "multiple instances of betting irregularities over the past several months". On April 11, the Colorado Division of Gaming issued an instruction to state sportsbook operators to immediately report any potential wagering on "NBA affiliated games" by accounts connected to Porter. The investigation centered on irregularities found related to proposition bets around Porter's individual statistics.

By then, Porter was deep in the throes of a gambling addiction. He had been placing bets on FanDuel after his first stint in the NBA ended with mixed results. For instance, he took a $500,000 loan against his house and lost it all. Another time, he bet on Russian table tennis and made $1 million after three days of betting. Despite his record, he became a VIP on FanDuel, getting numerous comps like courtside seats at NBA games and Super Bowl tickets. In one week, he bet more money than anyone else on the platform. According to Frank Cardenas, a VIP manager who handled Porter's account, FanDuel was well aware that Porter couldn't afford to pay for his gambling. Porter sent money from his PayPal account to FanDuel, and at one point had severely overdrawn his PayPal account. The gambling put a strain on his marriage. Even after his new wife, Kelli, discovered his addiction and cut off access to their accounts, he would use her credit cards to gamble. Porter's family staged an intervention and sent him to rehab in Florida, but even after leaving his gambling continued unabated.

By the time he made it back to the NBA, Porter had run up massive gambling debts. His right knee had never fully recovered from the severe injury he'd suffered at Missouri, making it harder for him to catch on in the NBA. Soon after arriving in Toronto, he used a friend's phone to secretly bet on NBA games; while he netted modest profits, they were still not enough to pay off his earlier debts. By the winter of 2024, he had amassed a particularly large debt to Brooklyn gambler Ammar Awawdeh; according to a post-mortem by Toronto Life, the debt was large enough that Awawdeh could potentially "end Porter's career in an instant." Using this leverage, Awadeh pressed Porter to pay off the debts by performing a number of "specials" for Awawdeh and four of his friends–Long Phi "Bruce" Pham, Shane Hennen, Timothy McCormack, and Mahmoud Mollah. Porter took part in a scheme to help Awawdeh and his friends win proposition bets tied to Porter's performance. Awawdeh and his co-conspirators would bet that Porter would fall short of certain benchmarks. Porter then feigned injury to leave games early, ensuring the bets would hit.

Porter had hoped to clear off the debt by feigning an eye injury in a January game against the Los Angeles Clippers. Awadeh and his co-conspirators bet that Porter would miss certain benchmarks on DraftKings. The bets hit, but DraftKings' spending limits prevented them from putting down enough money to wipe away the debt. Awadeh pressed him to try again during the Raptors' March 20 game against the Sacramento Kings.

According to the NBA, Porter told Awawdeh, Pham, and Mollah in a secret Telegram channel that he intended to feign illness again ahead of the game. He had laid the groundwork for doing so the previous week by complaining about food poisoning. He also bet that the Raptors would lose the game. While at the Resorts Casino Hotel in Atlantic City with Awawdeh, McCormack, and Pham, Mollah then used his account with DraftKings' sportsbook at the casino to wager $80,000 on a parlay bet that Porter would not meet certain player statistics – an under bet – which would have won $1.1 million. Porter, Awawdeh, Pham, and Mollah would have each received 24 percent of the proceeds had the bet hit, while McCormack would have gotten the rest. Porter's behavior drew notice once he removed himself from the game due to illness. The size of the bet was highly irregular given Porter's relatively low stature. According to The New Yorker, a massive parlay would have raised eyebrows had it been made on a star like LeBron James, but doing so with a low-level reserve like Porter was "practically a confession" that the bet was illegitimate. The low odds also raised suspicion. Additionally, Awadeh had secretly read other co-conspirators into the scheme. After an independent monitor and DraftKings' algorithms flagged the bet, DraftKings refused to pay out and froze Mollah's account. Internal investigations by FanDuel and DraftKings revealed other suspicious bets Mollah placed on Porter's performance, including the Clippers game in which Porter feigned an eye injury. It was the largest payout of the night, as was the March 20 game. DraftKings and FanDuel reported their findings to the NBA and the International Betting Integrity Association. The FBI was called in as well. In its investigation, the NBA also found that between January and March 2024, Porter had placed 13 bets on NBA games using another person's account. Some of the wagers included parlay bets involving the Raptors losing. His wagers totaled $54,000 over that period, netting over $22,000 in winnings. The NBA accused him of "disclosing confidential information to sports bettors, limiting his own participation in one or more games for betting purposes, and betting on NBA games".

On April 17, Porter was banned for life from further play or any other involvement in the NBA and its associated leagues. He became the first active player to be banned for gambling since Jack Molinas in 1954, as well as the first active player to be permanently banned from the NBA without any means to return since Richard Dumas in 1996. On June 4, 2024, Pham was arrested at JFK International Airport while attempting to flee the country. McCormack, Mollad, and Awawdeh were subsequently taken into custody as well. On July 3, Porter was also charged with a federal felony in relation to the case involving those four men. On July 3, 2024, court papers were made public revealing Porter's imminent criminal charges in the United States at the federal level for his role in the sports betting scandal. Porter is also undergoing a criminal investigation in Canada. In the federal case on July 10, Porter would plead guilty to a charge of conspiracy to commit wire fraud, which could impose a range of no time in prison to up to 20 years in prison for what he did, but faces a most likely time of 41 to 51 months in prison. One of the conditions related to his guilty plea was to forfeit his passport for a pre-sentence release, which forbade him to play overseas for the Promitheas Patras B.C. of the Greek Basketball League. The NBA would also implement what is called the "Jontay Porter Rule" following his ban, which forbade sportsbooks from including unders on player props who are on either two-way contracts or 10-day contracts.

== Post-ban basketball career ==
=== Seattle Super Hawks (2026–present) ===
On February 25, 2026, close to two years after being permanently banned by the NBA and still awaiting sentencing in his federal case, Porter signed a contract to join the Seattle Super Hawks for the 2026 version of the United States Basketball League. He made his debut with Seattle on March 7, producing a triple-double of 21 points, 14 rebounds, and 14 assists, alongside three blocks and two steals in a 111–88 win over the Lilac City Legends. Porter helped the Super Hawks to a nearly undefeated season and led them to the championship in the league's inaugural season. On June 6, Porter was named as the league's Most Valuable Player.

== Personal life ==
In addition to his older brother Michael Porter Jr. with the Brooklyn Nets, Jontay has two older sisters, Bri and Cierra, both of whom were deemed medically retired from playing sports, both due to multiple leg injuries. Cierra Porter later returned for her senior year at the University of Missouri. Two of Porter's younger brothers, Coban and Jevon, played collegiate basketball as well, with Coban previously playing for the University of Denver and Jevon currently playing for Missouri after he previously played for Pepperdine for two seasons and Loyola Marymount for the 2024–25 season.

Porter and his wife Kelli Kingma had their first child in November 2024. They now have two children.

== Career statistics ==
Legend
| GP | Games played | GS | Games started | MPG | Minutes per game |
| FG% | Field goal percentage | 3P% | 3-point field goal percentage | FT% | Free throw percentage |
| RPG | Rebounds per game | APG | Assists per game | SPG | Steals per game |
| BPG | Blocks per game | PPG | Points per game | **Bold** | Career high |

=== NBA ===
| Year | Team | GP | GS | MPG | FG% | 3P% | FT% | RPG | APG | SPG | BPG | PPG |
|---|---|---|---|---|---|---|---|---|---|---|---|---|
| 2020–21 | Memphis | 11 | 0 | 4.9 | **.533** | **.375** | .600 | 1.3 | .1 | .3 | .1 | 2.0 |
| 2023–24 | Toronto | **26** | **5** | **13.8** | .385 | .333 | **.833** | **3.2** | **2.3** | **.8** | **.8** | **4.4** |
| Career | | 37 | 5 | 11.2 | .403 | .338 | .783 | 2.6 | 1.6 | .6 | .6 | 3.7 |

=== NBA G League ===
==== Showcase Cup ====
| Year | Team | GP | GS | MPG | FG% | 3P% | FT% | RPG | APG | SPG | BPG | PPG |
|---|---|---|---|---|---|---|---|---|---|---|---|---|
| 2022–23 | Wisconsin | **15** | 8 | 27.0 | .442 | .411 | .714 | 8.5 | 2.4 | .5 | 1.5 | 13.5 |
| 2023–24 | Motor City | 10 | **10** | **33.7** | .456 | .277 | .667 | **11.1** | 2.5 | .8 | **2.8** | 16.8 |
| 2023–24 | 905 | 5 | 5 | 27.0 | **.607** | **.682** | **1.000** | 9.2 | **4.0** | **1.4** | 2.4 | **18.8** |
| Career | | 30 | 23 | 29.2 | .475 | .395 | .727 | 9.5 | 2.7 | .7 | 2.1 | 15.5 |

==== Regular season ====
| Year | Team | GP | GS | MPG | FG% | 3P% | FT% | RPG | APG | SPG | BPG | PPG |
|---|---|---|---|---|---|---|---|---|---|---|---|---|
| 2020–21 | Memphis | 9 | 0 | 16.8 | .342 | .184 | .556 | 4.7 | 1.2 | .9 | 1.2 | 7.4 |
| 2022–23 | Wisconsin | **17** | **13** | 29.4 | **.353** | .287 | .600 | **11.4** | 3.4 | .9 | **2.6** | 11.5 |
| 2023–24 | 905 | 7 | 7 | **30.3** | .344 | **.298** | **.636** | 10.9 | **6.0** | **1.4** | **2.6** | **13.1** |
| Career | | 33 | 20 | 26.1 | .348 | .270 | .600 | 9.5 | 3.5 | 1.0 | 2.3 | 10.7 |

=== College ===
| Year | Team | GP | GS | MPG | FG% | 3P% | FT% | RPG | APG | SPG | BPG | PPG |
|---|---|---|---|---|---|---|---|---|---|---|---|---|
| 2017–18 | Missouri | 33 | 7 | 24.5 | .437 | .364 | .750 | 6.8 | 2.2 | .8 | 1.7 | 9.9 |

== See also ==
- 2025 NBA illegal gambling prosecution, a somewhat related scenario following Jontay Porter's banning from the NBA
- Jack Molinas
- List of people banned or suspended by the NBA
