= 2018–19 Texas Longhorns men's basketball team =

American college basketball season

2018–19 Texas Longhorns men's basketball

NIT Champions
- Conference: Big 12 Conference
- Record: 21–16 (8–10 Big 12)
- Head coach: Shaka Smart (4th season)
- Assistant coaches: Darrin Horn; Jai Lucas; Neill Berry
- Home arena: Frank Erwin Center

2018–19 Big 12 men's basketball standings
	Conf.				Overall
Team	W		L	PCT	W		L	PCT
No. 19 Kansas State	14	–	4	.778	25	–	9	.735
No. 2 Texas Tech	14	–	4	.778	31	–	7	.816
No. 16 Kansas	12	–	6	.667	26	–	10	.722
Baylor	10	–	8	.556	20	–	14	.588
No. 25 Iowa State †	9	–	9	.500	23	–	12	.657
Texas	8	–	10	.444	21	–	16	.568
Oklahoma	7	–	11	.389	20	–	14	.588
TCU	7	–	11	.389	23	–	14	.622
Oklahoma State	5	–	13	.278	12	–	20	.375
West Virginia	4	–	14	.222	15	–	21	.417
† 2019 Big 12 tournament winner Rankings from AP Poll

The 2018–19 Texas Longhorns men's basketball team represented the University of Texas at Austin in the 2018–19 NCAA Division I men's basketball season. They were led by fourth-year head coach Shaka Smart and played their home games at the Frank Erwin Center in Austin, Texas as members of the Big 12 Conference. The team won the 2019 National Invitational Tournament with Senior Forward Dylan Osetkowski being named MVP.

== Previous season ==
The Longhorns finished the 2017–18 season 19–15, 8–10 in Big 12 play to finish in seventh place. They defeated Iowa State in the first round of the Big 12 tournament before losing to Texas Tech in the quarterfinals. They received an at-large bid to the NCAA tournament as the No. 10 seed in the South region where they lost to Nevada in the first round.

== Offseason ==
=== Departures ===
Name	Number	Height	Position	Class	Reason
James Banks III	00	6'10"	C	Sophomore	Transferred to Georgia Tech
Jacob Young	3	6'2"	G	Sophomore	Transferred to Rutgers
Mo Bamba	4	6'11"	C	Freshman	Declared for the NBA draft/hired an agent
Eric Davis	10	6'2"	G	Junior	Declared for the NBA draft/hired an agent
Isaiah Hobbs	22	6'3"	G	Senior	Graduate transferred to Barry
Joe Schwartz	25	6'3"	G	Senior	Walk-on; graduated
Ryan McClurg	30	6'5"	F	Senior	Walk-on; graduated

== Recruits ==
=== 2018 recruiting class ===
College recruiting information
Name	Hometown	School	Height	Weight	Commit date
Gerald Liddell #11 SF	Cibolo, TX	Byron P. Steele II High School	6 ft 7 in (2.01 m)	180 lb (82 kg)	Aug 10, 2017
Gerald Liddell #11 SF	Recruit ratings: Scout: Rivals: 247Sports: ESPN:				
Courtney Ramey #11 PG	St. Louis, MO	Webster Groves High School	6 ft 3 in (1.91 m)	170 lb (77 kg)	Apr 27, 2018
Courtney Ramey #11 PG	Recruit ratings: Scout: Rivals: 247Sports: ESPN:				
Kamaka Hepa #13 PF	Barrow, AK	Jefferson High School	6 ft 9 in (2.06 m)	210 lb (95 kg)	Oct 31, 2017
Kamaka Hepa #13 PF	Recruit ratings: Scout: Rivals: 247Sports: ESPN:				
Jaxson Hayes #9 C	Loveland, OH	Moeller High School	6 ft 10 in (2.08 m)	200 lb (91 kg)	Sep 29, 2017
Jaxson Hayes #9 C	Recruit ratings: Scout: Rivals: 247Sports: ESPN:				
Brock Cunningham #41 PF	Austin, TX	Westlake High School	6 ft 7 in (2.01 m)	205 lb (93 kg)	Aug 4, 2017
Brock Cunningham #41 PF	Recruit ratings: Scout: Rivals: 247Sports: ESPN:				
Overall recruit ranking: Scout: 8 Rivals: 9 247Sports: 8 ESPN: 13
Note: In many cases, Scout, Rivals, 247Sports, On3, and ESPN may conflict in their listings of height and weight.; In these cases, the average was taken. ESPN grades are on a 100-point scale.; Sources: "2018 Texas Basketball Commitment List". Rivals.; "Texas 2018 Basketball Commits". Scout.; "2018 Player Commits". ESPN.; "Scout.com Team Recruiting Rankings". Scout.; "2018 Team Ranking". Rivals.

== Roster ==
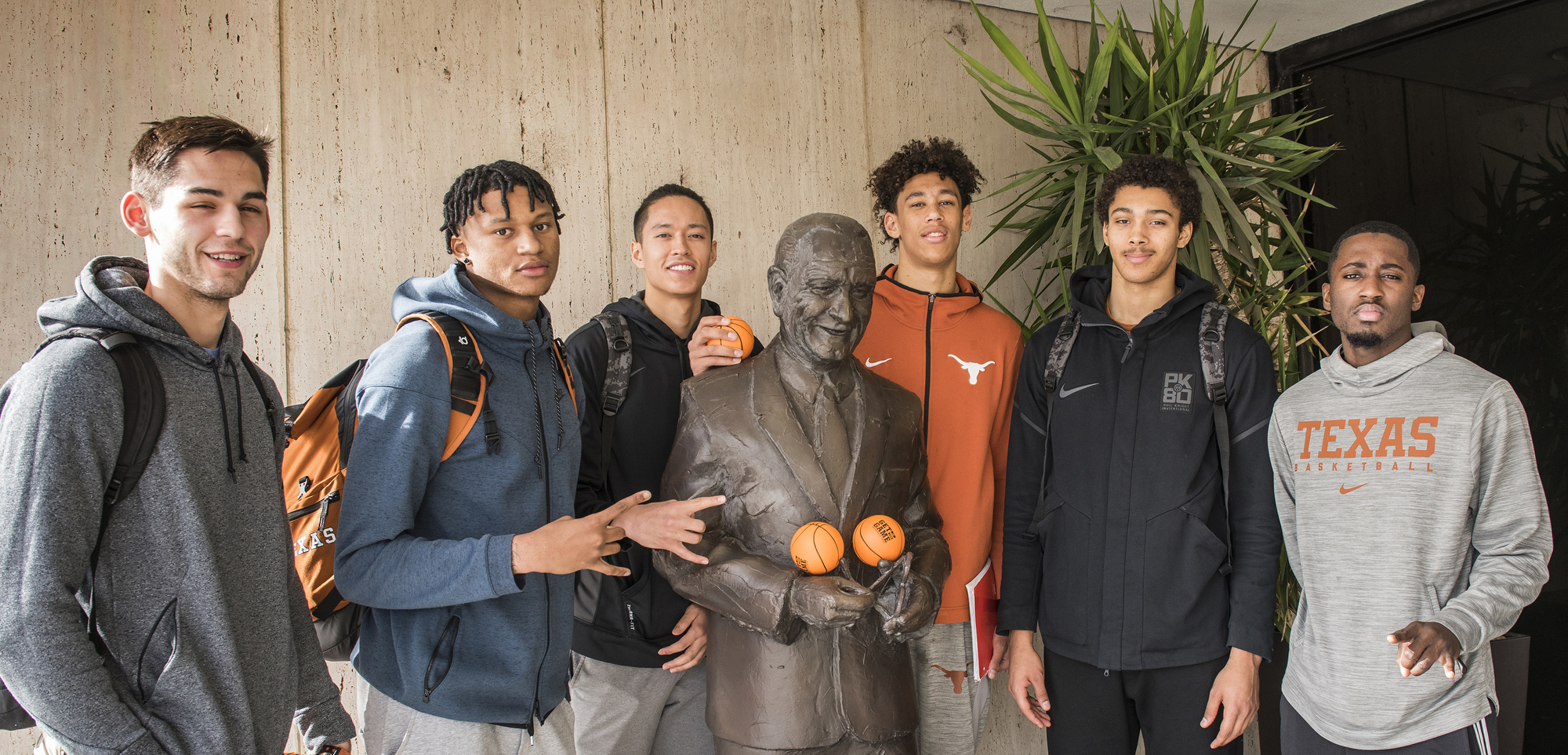
Brock Cunningham, Gerald Liddell, Kamaka Hepa, Jaxson Hayes, Jericho Sims and Courtney Ramey tour the LBJ Library in December 2018

2018–19 Texas Longhorns men's basketball team
Players
Coaches

Pos.	#	Name	Height	Weight	Year	Previous school	Hometown
F	0	Gerald Liddell	6 ft 8 in (2.03 m)	200 lb (91 kg)	Fr	Byron P. Steele	Cibolo, TX
G	1	Andrew Jones	6 ft 4 in (1.93 m)	180 lb (82 kg)	RS So	MacArthur	Irving, TX
G	2	Matt Coleman III	6 ft 2 in (1.88 m)	180 lb (82 kg)	So	Oak Hill Academy	Norfolk, VA
G	3	Courtney Ramey	6 ft 3 in (1.91 m)	185 lb (84 kg)	Fr	Webster Groves	St. Louis, MO
G	4	Drayton Whiteside (W)	6 ft 0 in (1.83 m)	156 lb (71 kg)	Jr	Vandegrift	Austin, TX
F	5	Royce Hamm Jr.	6 ft 8 in (2.03 m)	240 lb (109 kg)	So	Aldine Davis	Houston, TX
C	10	Jaxson Hayes	6 ft 11 in (2.11 m)	220 lb (100 kg)	Fr	Moeller	Loveland, OH
G	12	Kerwin Roach	6 ft 4 in (1.93 m)	180 lb (82 kg)	Sr	North Shore	Houston, TX
G	13	Jase Febres	6 ft 5 in (1.96 m)	190 lb (86 kg)	So	Westfield	Houston, TX
C	20	Jericho Sims	6 ft 9 in (2.06 m)	240 lb (109 kg)	So	Cristo Rey Jesuit	Minneapolis, MN
F	21	Dylan Osetkowski	6 ft 9 in (2.06 m)	250 lb (113 kg)	RS Sr	Tulane	San Diego, CA
G	22	Blake Nevins (W)	6 ft 5 in (1.96 m)	205 lb (93 kg)	So	Cypress Ranch	Cypress, TX
F	30	Brock Cunningham	6 ft 6 in (1.98 m)	215 lb (98 kg)	Fr	Westlake	Austin, TX
F	33	Kamaka Hepa	6 ft 9 in (2.06 m)	225 lb (102 kg)	Fr	Jefferson	Barrow, AK
G	55	Elijah Mitrou-Long	6 ft 1 in (1.85 m)	185 lb (84 kg)	RS Jr	Mount St. Mary's	Mississauga, ON

Head coach

- Shaka Smart (Kenyon)

Assistant coach(es)

- Darrin Horn (Western Kentucky)
- Jai Lucas (Texas)
- Neill Berry (Southeastern Louisiana)

Legend

- (C) Team captain
- (S) Suspended
- (I) Ineligible
- (W) Walk-on
- Injured
- Current redshirt

Roster

=== Depth chart ===
Pos.	Starting 5	Bench 1	Bench 2
F/C	Dylan Osetkowski	Jericho Sims
F	Jaxson Hayes	Kamaka Hepa	Royce Hamm Jr.
G/F	Kerwin Roach	Jase Febres	Gerald Liddell
G	Matt Coleman III	Blake Nevins (W)	Andrew Jones
PG	Elijah Mitrou-Long	Courtney Ramey

== Schedule and results ==
Date time, TV	Rank^{#}	Opponent^{#}	Result	Record	High points	High rebounds	High assists	Site (attendance) city, state
Regular season
November 6, 2018*; 7:00 pm, LHN		Eastern Illinois	W 71–59	1–0	13 – Coleman III	6 – Mitrou-Long	7 – Coleman III	Frank Erwin Center (7,522); Austin, TX
November 9, 2018*; 6:00 pm, ESPN		vs. Arkansas; Armed Forces Classic	W 73–71 ^{OT}	2–0	18 – Roach II	13 – Osetkowski	4 – Coleman III	Fort Bliss (1,400); El Paso, TX
November 12, 2018*; 7:00 pm, LHN		Louisiana–Monroe; Las Vegas Invitational campus-site game	W 65–55	3–0	13 – Roach	10 – Osetkowski	6 – Roach	Frank Erwin Center (7,453); Austin, TX
November 16, 2018*; 7:00 pm, LHN		The Citadel; Las Vegas Invitational campus-site game	W 97–69	4–0	15 – Tied	11 – Osetowski	6 – Mitrou-Long	Frank Erwin Center (8,212); Austin, TX
November 22, 2018*; 6:30 pm, FS1		vs. No. 7 North Carolina; Las Vegas Invitational semifinal	W 92–89	5–0	32 – Roach II	9 – Hayes	7 – Roach II	Orleans Arena (7,489); Paradise, NV
November 23, 2018*; 5:30 pm, FOX		vs. No. 11 Michigan State; Las Vegas Invitational championship	L 68–78	5–1	15 – Roach II	6 – Sims	5 – Roach II	Orleans Arena (6,500); Paradise, NV
November 30, 2018*; 6:00 pm, LHN	No. 17	Radford	L 59–62	5–2	16 – Sims	17 – Osetkowski	3 – Roach II	Frank Erwin Center (8,137); Austin, TX
December 5, 2018*; 7:00 pm, ESPNU		VCU	L 53–54	5–3	14 – Sims	9 – Osetkowski	3 – Tied	Frank Erwin Center (8,190); Austin, TX
December 9, 2018*; 5:00 pm, ESPN2		Purdue	W 72–68	6–3	22 – Coleman III	6 – Febres	5 – Roach II	Frank Erwin Center (10,048); Austin, TX
December 15, 2018*; 5:00 pm, LHN		Grand Canyon	W 98–60	7–3	16 – Tied	7 – Osetkowski	8 – Ramey	Frank Erwin Center (8,265); Austin, TX
December 21, 2018*; 8:00 pm, ESPN2		Providence	L 65–71	7–4	13 – Tied	10 – Osetkowski	4 – Mitrou-Long	Frank Erwin Center (8,610); Austin, TX
December 28, 2018*; 7:00 pm, LHN		UT Arlington	W 76–56	8–4	12 – Febres	8 – Osetkowski	3 – Tied	Frank Erwin Center (9,188); Austin, TX
January 2, 2019; 8:00 pm, ESPNU		at Kansas State	W 67–47	9–4 (1–0)	23 – Febres	11 – Hayes	7 – Coleman III	Bramlage Coliseum (10,137); Manhattan, KS
January 5, 2019; 5:00 pm, ESPN2		West Virginia; Saturday Showcase	W 61–54	10–4 (2–0)	17 – Coleman III	7 – Osetkowski	3 – Coleman III	Frank Erwin Center (9,195); Austin, TX
January 8, 2019; 6:00 pm, ESPNU		at Oklahoma State; Super Tuesday	L 58–61	10–5 (2–1)	18 – Roach II	7 – Roach II	4 – Coleman III	Gallagher-Iba Arena; Stillwater, OK
January 12, 2019; 1:00 pm, LHN		No. 8 Texas Tech	L 62–68	10–6 (2–2)	17 – Roach II	9 – Osetkowski	5 – Tied	Frank Erwin Center (14,070); Austin, TX
January 14, 2019; 8:00 pm, ESPN		at No. 7 Kansas; Big Monday	L 78–80	10–7 (2–3)	16 – Coleman III	9 – Osetkowski	8 – Coleman III	Allen Fieldhouse (16,300); Lawrence, KS
January 19, 2019; 7:00 pm, LHN		No. 20 Oklahoma	W 75–72	11–7 (3–3)	23 – Roach	11 – Osetkowski	2 – Tied	Frank Erwin Center (11,991); Austin, TX
January 23, 2019; 6:00 pm, ESPNU		at TCU	L 61–65	11–8 (3–4)	15 – Roach	10 – Osetkowski	5 – Ramey	Schollmaier Arena (7,099); Fort Worth, TX
January 26, 2018*; 1:00 pm, ESPN2		at Georgia; Big 12/SEC Challenge/Saturday Showcase	L 88–98	11–9	19 – Ramey	7 – Osetkowski	5 – Ramey	Stegeman Coliseum (10,374); Athens, GA
January 29, 2019; 6:00 pm, ESPN		No. 11 Kansas; Super Tuesday	W 73–63	12–9 (4–4)	16 – Osetkowski	9 – Hayes	4 – Coleman III	Frank Erwin Center (11,934); Austin, TX
February 2, 2019; 1:00 pm, ESPN2		at No. 20 Iowa State; Saturday Showcase	L 60–65	12–10 (4–5)	19 – Roach II	8 – Hayes	5 – Coleman III	Hilton Coliseum (14,384); Ames, IA
February 6, 2019; 7:00 pm, LHN		Baylor	W 84–72	13–10 (5–5)	21 – Roach II	7 – Osetkowski	5 – Coleman III	Frank Erwin Center (9,831); Austin, TX
February 9, 2019; 7:00 pm, ESPN2		at West Virginia; Saturday Showcase	W 75–53	14–10 (6–5)	19 – Ramey	10 – Osetkowski	5 – Coleman III	WVU Coliseum (12,815); Morgantown, WV
February 12, 2019; 8:00 pm, ESPN2		No. 18 Kansas State; Super Tuesday	L 64–71	14–11 (6–6)	17 – Roach II	8 – Roach II	5 – Coleman III	Frank Erwin Center (9,418); Austin, TX
February 16, 2019; 12:00 pm, CBS		Oklahoma State	W 69–57	15–11 (7–6)	16 – Roach II	7 – Tied	3 – Tied	Frank Erwin Center (10,406); Austin, TX
February 23, 2019; 11:00 am, ESPNU		at Oklahoma; Saturday Showcase	L 67–69	15–12 (7–7)	15 – Febres	6 – Tied	5 – Coleman III	Lloyd Noble Center (9,116); Norman, OK
February 27, 2019; 8:00 pm, ESPN2		at Baylor; Wednesday Night Hoops	L 83–84 ^{OT}	15–13 (7–8)	23 – Febres	5 – Hamm Jr.	10 – Ramey	Ferrell Center (5,796); Waco, TX
March 2, 2019; 1:00 pm, ESPN2		Iowa State; Saturday Showcase	W 86–69	16–13 (8–8)	26 – Febres	6 – Osetkowski	10 – Coleman III	Frank Erwin Center (10,494); Austin, TX
March 4, 2019; 8:00 pm, ESPN		at No. 8 Texas Tech; Big Monday	L 51–70	16–14 (8–9)	16 – Coleman III	5 – Osetkowski	1 – Coleman III	United Supermarkets Arena (15,098); Lubbock, TX
March 9, 2019; 11:00 am, ESPN2		TCU; Saturday Showcase	L 56–69	16–15 (8–10)	19 – Hayes	7 – Tied	5 – Ramey	Frank Erwin Center (9,762); Austin, TX
Big 12 Tournament
March 14, 2019; 8:00 pm, ESPN2	(6)	vs. (3) No. 17 Kansas; Quarterfinals	L 57–65	16–16	18 – Osetkowski	7 – Osetkowski	3 – Tied	Sprint Center (18,927); Kansas City, MO
NIT
March 19, 2019*; 8:00 pm, ESPN	(2)	(7) South Dakota State; First Round – Alabama Bracket	W 79–73	17–16	26 – Osetkowski	6 – Sims	4 – Ramey	Frank Erwin Center (1,739); Austin, TX
March 24, 2019*; 3:00 pm, ESPN	(2)	(3) Xavier; Second Round – Alabama Bracket	W 78–76 ^{OT}	18–16	21 – Roach II	10 – Sims	6 – Roach II	Frank Erwin Center (3,204); Austin, TX
March 27, 2019*; 8:00 pm, ESPN2	(2)	(4) Colorado; Quarterfinals – Alabama Bracket	W 68–55	19–16	15 – Osetkowski	10 – Sims	3 – Tied	Frank Erwin Center (3,982); Austin, TX
April 2, 2019*; 9:00 pm, ESPN	(2)	vs. (1) TCU; Semifinals	W 58–44	20–16	22 – Roach II	9 – Osetkowski	8 – Ramey	Madison Square Garden (4,599); New York City, NY
April 4, 2019*; 7:00 pm, ESPN	(2)	vs. (5) Lipscomb; Championship	W 81–66	21–16	19 – Osetkowski	11 – Osetkowski	9 – Roach	Madison Square Garden (4,051); New York City, NY
*Non-conference game. ^{#}Rankings from AP Poll. (#) Tournament seedings in parentheses. All times are in Eastern Time.

== Rankings ==
Ranking movements Legend: ██ Increase in ranking ██ Decrease in ranking — = Not ranked RV = Received votes
	Week																				
Poll	Pre	1	2	3	4	5	6	7	8	9	10	11	12	13	14	15	16	17	18	19	Final
AP	RV	RV	RV	17	RV	RV	—	—	—	RV	—	—	—	—	RV	—	—	—	—	—	Not released
Coaches	RV	RV^	RV	17	RV	RV	—	—	—	RV	—	—	—	RV	RV	RV	—	RV	—	—	RV

*AP does not release post-NCAA Tournament rankings
^Coaches did not release a Week 2 poll.
