= 2021–22 Texas Longhorns men's basketball team =

American college basketball season

2021–22 Texas Longhorns men's basketball

NCAA tournament, Second Round
- Conference: Big 12 Conference

Ranking
- AP: No. 25
- Record: 22–12 (10–8 Big 12)
- Head coach: Chris Beard (1st season)
- Associate head coach: Rodney Terry (1st season)
- Assistant coaches: Ulric Maligi (1st season); Jerrance Howard (1st season)
- Home arena: Frank Erwin Center

2021–22 Big 12 men's basketball standings
	Conf.				Overall
Team	W		L	PCT	W		L	PCT
No. 3 Kansas †	14	–	4	.778	34	–	6	.850
No. 4 Baylor	14	–	4	.778	27	–	7	.794
No. 12 Texas Tech	12	–	6	.667	27	–	10	.730
No. 25 Texas	10	–	8	.556	22	–	12	.647
TCU	8	–	10	.444	21	–	13	.618
Oklahoma State*	8	–	10	.444	15	–	15	.500
Iowa State	7	–	11	.389	22	–	13	.629
Oklahoma	7	–	11	.389	19	–	16	.543
Kansas State	6	–	12	.333	14	–	17	.452
West Virginia	4	–	14	.222	16	–	17	.485
† 2022 Big 12 Tournament winner *Oklahoma State was ineligible for both the 2022 Big 12 Tournament and the 2022 NCAA tournament due to postseason ban imposed by the NCAA. Rankings from AP poll

The 2021–22 Texas Longhorns men's basketball team represented the University of Texas at Austin in the 2021–22 NCAA Division I men's basketball season. They were led by first-year head coach Chris Beard and played their home games at the Frank Erwin Center in Austin, Texas as members of the Big 12 Conference. They finished the season 22–12, 10–8 in Big 12 play to finish in fourth place. As the No. 4 seed in the Big 12 tournament, they were defeated in the Quarterfinals by TCU. They received an at-large bid to the NCAA tournament as the No. 6 seed in the East Region, where they defeated Virginia Tech in the first round before losing to Purdue in the second round.

This was the Longhorns' final season at the Frank Erwin Center, with the new Moody Center opening for the 2022–23 season.

== Previous season ==
In a season limited due to the ongoing COVID-19 pandemic, the Longhorns finished the 2020–21 season 19–8, and 11–6 in Big 12 play, finishing in a tie for third place. As the No. 3 seed in the Big 12 tournament, they defeated Texas Tech in the first round and advanced to the tournament championship game due to COVID-19 issues at Kansas. There, they defeated Oklahoma State to win the Big 12 Tournament championship. As a result, they received the conference's automatic bid to the NCAA tournament as the No. 3 seed in the East region. They were upset in the first round by Abilene Christian.

On March 26, 2021, head coach Shaka Smart left the school to take the head coaching job at Marquette. Shortly thereafter, the school named Texas Tech coach Chris Beard the team's new head coach.

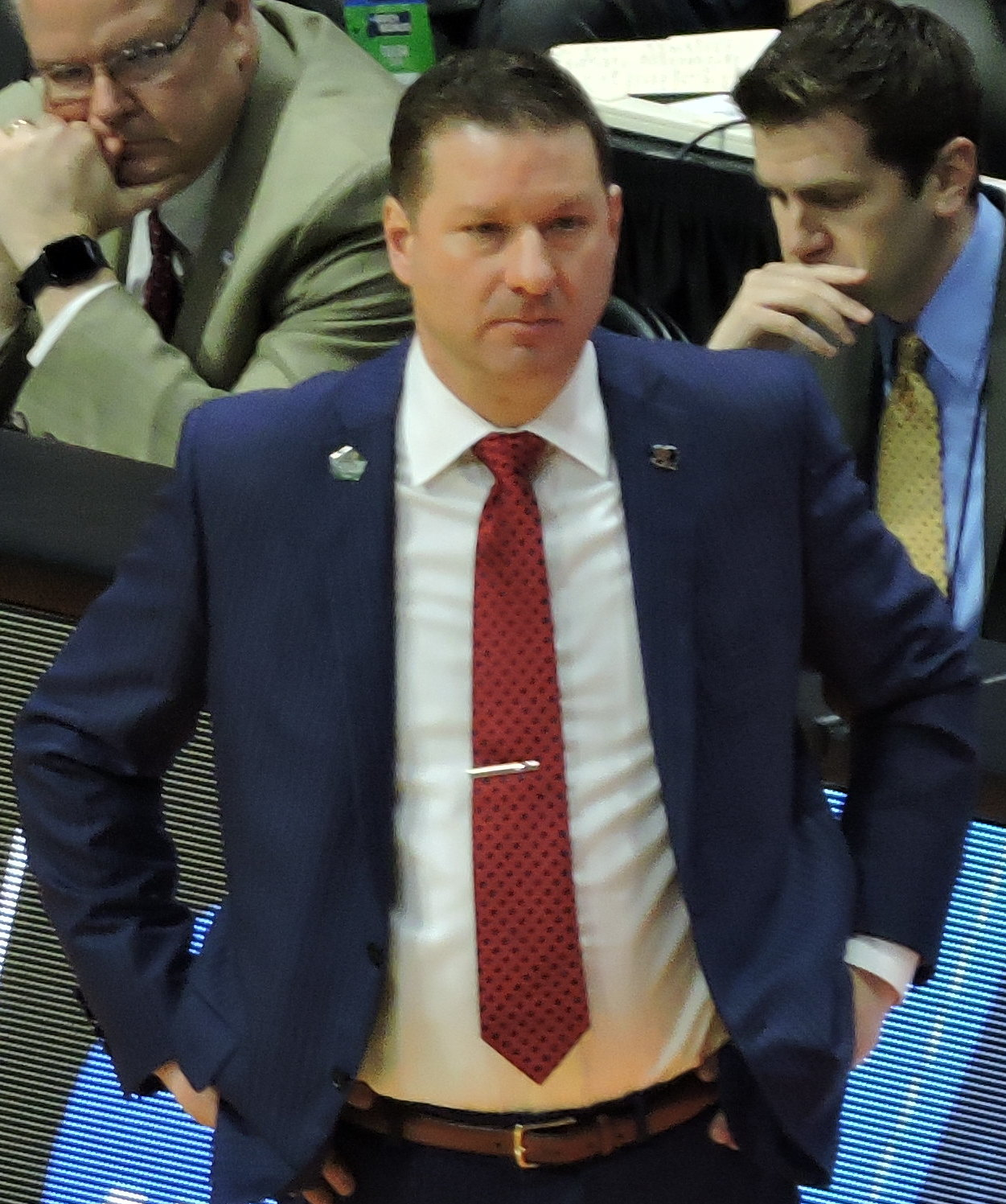
Texas Head coach Chris Beard

== Offseason ==
=== Departures ===
Texas Departures
Name	Number	Pos.	Height	Weight	Year	Hometown	Reason for Departures
Gerald Liddell	0	F	6’8”	200	Junior	Cibolo, TX	Transferred to Alabama State
Matt Coleman III	2	G	6’2”	180	Senior	Norfolk, VA	Signed as an undrafted free agent with the Sacramento Kings
Greg Brown	4	F	6’9”	205	Freshman	Austin, TX	Drafted in the 2021 NBA draft as the 43rd pick in the 2nd round by the New Orleans Pelicans
Royce Hamm Jr.	5	F	6’9”	225	Senior	Houston, TX	Transferred to UNLV
Donovan Williams	10	G	6’6”	190	Sophomore	Houston, TX	Transferred to UNLV
Drayton Whiteside	14	G	6’0”	160	Senior	Austin, TX	Graduated
Jericho Sims	20	F	6’10”	245	Senior	Minneapolis, MN	Drafted in the 2021 NBA draft as the 58th pick in the 2nd round by the New York Knicks
Kai Jones	22	F	6’11”	218	Sophomore	Nassau, Bahamas	Drafted in the 2021 NBA Draft as the 19th pick in the 1st round by the New York Knicks
Kamaka Hepa	33	F	6’9”	220	Junior	Utqiagvik, AK	Transferred to Hawaii
Blake Nevins	34	F	6’5”	205	Senior	Cypress, TX	Graduated

=== Incoming transfers ===
Texas Incoming transfers
Name	Number	Pos.	Height	Weight	Year	Hometown	Previous school	Years Remaining	Date Eligible
Timmy Allen	0	F	6'6"	210	Senior	Mesa, AZ	Utah	2	October 1, 2021
Marcus Carr	2	G	6'2"	190	Senior	Toronto, ON	Minnesota	2	October 1, 2021
Dylan Disu	4	F	6'9"	225	Junior	Pflugerville, TX	Vanderbilt	3	October 1, 2021
Devin Askew	5	G	6'3"	195	Sophomore	Sacramento, CA	Kentucky	4	October 1, 2021
Tristen Licon	12	G	6'0"	185	Senior	El Paso, TX	Sul Ross State	2	October 1, 2021
Avery Benson	21	G	6'4"	195	Senior	Springdale, AR	Texas Tech	2	October 1, 2021
Christian Bishop	32	F	6'7"	220	Senior	Lee’s Summit, MO	Creighton	2	October 1, 2021
Tre Mitchell	33	C	6'9"	220	Junior	Pittsburgh, PA	UMass	3	October 1, 2021

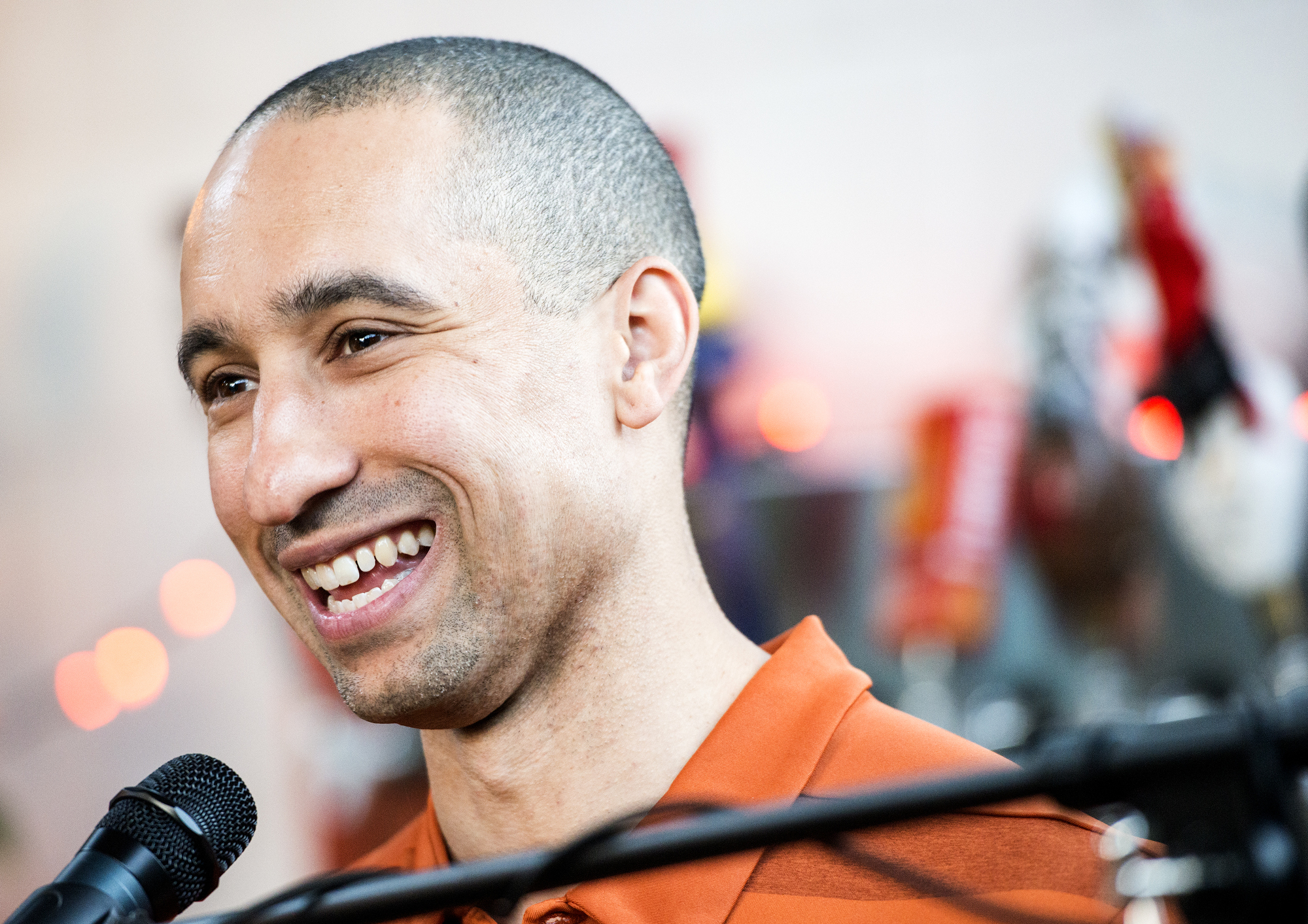
Shaka Smart departed Texas to be the head coach at Marquette.

=== Coaching staff departures ===
Name	Position	New Team	New Position
Shaka Smart	Head coach	Marquette	Head coach
K. T. Turner	Assistant coach	Oklahoma	Assistant coach
Neill Berry	Assistant coach	Marquette	Assistant coach
Cody Hatt	Assistant coach	Marquette	Assistant coach

=== Recruiting classes ===
==== 2021 recruiting class ====
College recruiting information
Name	Hometown	School	Height	Weight	Commit date
Jaylon Tyson; SF	Plano, TX	John Paul II High School	6 ft 6 in (1.98 m)	185 lb (84 kg)	Apr 8, 2021
Jaylon Tyson; SF	Recruit ratings: Rivals: 247Sports: ESPN: (89)				
Gavin Perryman; SG	Dallas, TX	Dallas Jesuit	6 ft 2 in (1.88 m)	175 lb (79 kg)	May 27, 2021
Gavin Perryman; SG	Recruit ratings: No ratings found				
Overall recruit ranking: Rivals: 20 247Sports: 13 ESPN: —
Note: In many cases, Scout, Rivals, 247Sports, On3, and ESPN may conflict in their listings of height and weight.; In these cases, the average was taken. ESPN grades are on a 100-point scale.; Sources: "Texas 2021 Basketball Commitments". Rivals.; "2021 Texas Longhorns Recruiting Class". ESPN.; "2021 Team Ranking". Rivals.

==== 2022 recruiting class ====
College recruiting information (2022)
Name	Hometown	School	Height	Weight	Commit date
Arterio Morris; PG	Dallas, TX	Justin F. Kimball High School	6 ft 3 in (1.91 m)	190 lb (86 kg)	Jul 17, 2021
Arterio Morris; PG	Recruit ratings: Rivals: 247Sports: ESPN: (90)				
Dillon Mitchell; SF	Montverde, FL	Montverde Academy	6 ft 7 in (2.01 m)	180 lb (82 kg)	Oct 25, 2021
Dillon Mitchell; SF	Recruit ratings: Rivals: 247Sports: ESPN: (93)				
Rowan Brumbaugh; PG	Gill, MA	Northfield Mount Hermon School	6 ft 4 in (1.93 m)	180 lb (82 kg)	Dec 30, 2021
Rowan Brumbaugh; PG	Recruit ratings: Rivals: 247Sports: ESPN: (82)				
Overall recruit ranking: Rivals: — 247Sports: 13 ESPN: —
Note: In many cases, Scout, Rivals, 247Sports, On3, and ESPN may conflict in their listings of height and weight.; In these cases, the average was taken. ESPN grades are on a 100-point scale.; Sources: "Texas 2022 Basketball Commitments". Rivals.; "2022 Texas Longhorns Recruiting Class". ESPN.; "2022 Team Ranking". Rivals.

=== 2021 NBA draft ===
Round	Pick	Player	Position	NBA Team
# 1	19	Kai Jones	F	New York Knicks
# 2	43	Greg Brown	F	New Orleans Pelicans
# 2	58	Jericho Sims	F	New York Knicks

== Preseason ==
=== Award watch lists ===
Listed in the order that they were released

Award	Player	Position	Year
Bob Cousy Award	Marcus Carr	G	R-Sr.
Jerry West Award	Andrew Jones	G	R-Sr.
Julius Erving Award	Timmy Allen	F	Sr.
Karl Malone Award	Tre Mitchell	C	Jr.
NABC Player of the Year	Marcus Carr	G	R-Sr.

=== Big 12 media poll ===
Big 12 media poll
Predicted finish	Team	Votes (1st place)
1	Kansas	80 (8)
2	Texas	70 (2)
3	Baylor	67
4	Texas Tech	51
T-5	Oklahoma State	49
T-5	West Virginia	49
7	Oklahoma	29
8	TCU	24
9	Kansas State	22
10	Iowa State	9

=== Preseason All-Big 12 teams ===
1st team

Marcus Carr – G (Coaches, Media)

Honorable Mention

Andrew Jones – G (Coaches, Media)

Tre Mitchell – C (Coaches, Media)

=== Preseason Big 12 Awards ===
Award	Player	Position	Year
Preseason Newcomer of the Year	Marcus Carr	G	R-Sr.

== Roster ==
2021–22 Texas Longhorns men's basketball team
Players
Coaches

Pos.	#	Name	Height	Weight	Year	Previous school	Hometown
F	0	Timmy Allen	6 ft 6 in (1.98 m)	210 lb (95 kg)	Sr	Red Mountain; Utah	Mesa, AZ
G	1	Andrew Jones	6 ft 4 in (1.93 m)	190 lb (86 kg)	RS Sr	MacArthur	Irving, TX
G	2	Marcus Carr	6 ft 2 in (1.88 m)	190 lb (86 kg)	RS Sr	Montverde Academy; Minnesota	Toronto, ON
G	3	Courtney Ramey	6 ft 3 in (1.91 m)	185 lb (84 kg)	Sr	Webster Groves	St. Louis, MO
F	4	Dylan Disu	6 ft 9 in (2.06 m)	225 lb (102 kg)	Jr	Hendrickson; Vanderbilt	Pflugerville, TX
G	5	Devin Askew	6 ft 3 in (1.91 m)	195 lb (88 kg)	So	Mater Dei; Kentucky	Sacramento, CA
F	10	Cole Bott (W)	6 ft 6 in (1.98 m)	195 lb (88 kg)	Fr	Northfield Mount Hermon School	Highlands Ranch, CO
G	12	Tristen Licon	6 ft 0 in (1.83 m)	185 lb (84 kg)	GS	Americas High School	El Paso, TX
G	13	Jase Febres	6 ft 5 in (1.96 m)	190 lb (86 kg)	GS	Westfield	Houston, TX
G/F	20	Jaylon Tyson	6 ft 7 in (2.01 m)	210 lb (95 kg)	Fr	John Paul II	Plano, TX
G	21	Avery Benson	6 ft 4 in (1.93 m)	195 lb (88 kg)	RS Sr	Southwest Christian Academy; Texas Tech	Springdale, AR
F	30	Brock Cunningham	6 ft 6 in (1.98 m)	210 lb (95 kg)	RS Jr	Westlake	Austin, TX
G	31	Gavin Perryman (W)	6 ft 1 in (1.85 m)	185 lb (84 kg)	Fr	Dallas Jesuit	Dallas, TX
F	32	Christian Bishop	6 ft 7 in (2.01 m)	220 lb (100 kg)	Sr	West; Creighton	Lee's Summit, MO
C	33	Tre Mitchell	6 ft 9 in (2.06 m)	220 lb (100 kg)	Jr	Woodstock; UMass	Pittsburgh, PA

Head coach

- Chris Beard (Texas)

Assistant coach(es)

- Rodney Terry (St. Edward's)
- Ulric Maligi (Howard)
- Jerrance Howard (Illinois)

Legend

- (C) Team captain
- (S) Suspended
- (I) Ineligible
- (W) Walk-on
- Injured
- Current redshirt

Roster
Last update: January 3, 2022

== Schedule and results ==
Date time, TV	Rank^{#}	Opponent^{#}	Result	Record	High points	High rebounds	High assists	Site (attendance) city, state
Exhibition
November 1, 2021*; 7:30 p.m., LHN	No. 5	Texas Lutheran	W 96–33	0–0	18 – Mitchell	6 – Cunningham	5 – Carr	Frank Erwin Center (N/A); Austin, TX
Regular season
November 9, 2021*; 8:00 p.m., LHN	No. 5	Houston Baptist	W 92–48	1–0	14 – Ramey	6 – Allen	7 – Carr	Frank Erwin Center (14,683); Austin, TX
November 13, 2021*; 9:30 p.m., ESPN2	No. 5	at No. 1 Gonzaga	L 74–86	1–1	18 – Allen	6 – Allen	4 – Allen	McCarthey Athletic Center (6,000); Spokane, WA
November 17, 2021*; 7:30 p.m., LHN	No. 8	Northern Colorado; Abe Lemons Classic	W 62–49	2–1	16 – Mitchell	8 – Allen	4 – Jones	Frank Erwin Center (11,083); Austin, TX
November 20, 2021*; 2:00 p.m., LHN	No. 8	San José State; Abe Lemons Classic	W 79–45	3–1	17 – Allen	8 – Mitchell	4 – tied	Frank Erwin Center (11,088); Austin, TX
November 24, 2021*; 7:30 p.m., LHN	No. 8	Cal Baptist; Abe Lemons Classic	W 68–44	4–1	15 – tied	8 – Allen	5 – Jones	Frank Erwin Center (10,878); Austin, TX
November 29, 2021*; 7:30 p.m., LHN	No. 7	Sam Houston State	W 73–57	5–1	19 – Carr	5 – Allen	7 – Allen	Gregory Gymnasium (2,834); Austin, TX
December 3, 2021*; 7:30 p.m., LHN	No. 7	UTRGV	W 88–58	6–1	17 – Bishop	5 – Mitchell	5 – Mitchell	Frank Erwin Center (10,865); Austin, TX
December 9, 2021*; 5:30 p.m., FS1	No. 7	at No. 23 Seton Hall; Big East–Big 12 Battle	L 60–64	6–2	19 – Mitchell	12 – Allen	3 – tied	Prudential Center (10,481); Newark, NJ
December 14, 2021*; 8:00 p.m., ESPNU	No. 17	Arkansas-Pine Bluff	W 63–31	7–2	14 – Mitchell	7 – tied	2 – tied	Frank Erwin Center (10,513); Austin, TX
December 19, 2021*; 2:00 p.m., ABC	No. 17	vs. Stanford; Pac-12 Coast-to-Coast Challenge	W 60–53	8–2	13 – Jones	5 – tied	4 – tied	T-Mobile Arena (1,600); Paradise, NV
December 22, 2021*; 1:00 p.m., LHN	No. 16	Alabama State	W 68–48	9–2	14 – Disu	7 – tied	4 – Allen	Frank Erwin Center (11,732); Austin, TX
December 28, 2021*; 7:30 p.m., LHN	No. 17	Incarnate Word	W 78–33	10–2	14 – tied	11 – Disu	7 – Allen	Frank Erwin Center (11,197); Austin, TX
January 1, 2022; 11:00 a.m., ESPNU	No. 17	West Virginia	W 74–59	11–2 (1–0)	20 – Carr	7 – Bishop	3 – tied	Frank Erwin Center (12,864); Austin, TX
January 4, 2022; 7:00 p.m., ESPN+	No. 14	at Kansas State	W 70–57	12–2 (2–0)	19 – Carr	14 – Allen	5 – Carr	Bramlage Coliseum (6,833); Manhattan, KS
January 8, 2022; 1:00 p.m., CBS	No. 14	at Oklahoma State	L 51–64	12–3 (2–1)	10 – tied	9 – Disu	3 – tied	Gallagher-Iba Arena (8,204); Stillwater, OK
January 11, 2022; 7:30 p.m., LHN	No. 21	Oklahoma	W 66–52	13–3 (3–1)	22 – Jones	8 – Bishop	5 – Carr	Frank Erwin Center (13,144); Austin, TX
January 15, 2022; 1:00 p.m., ESPN+	No. 21	at No. 15 Iowa State	L 70–79	13–4 (3–2)	18 – Jones	7 – Jones	6 – Carr	Hilton Coliseum (14,267); Ames, IA
January 18, 2022; 7:30 p.m., LHN	No. 23	Kansas State	L 65–66	13–5 (3–3)	25 – Carr	8 – Bishop	3 – tied	Frank Erwin Center (11,498); Austin, TX
January 22, 2022; 1:00 p.m., ESPN2	No. 23	Oklahoma State	W 56–51	14–5 (4–3)	14 – Carr	8 – Allen	3 – Allen	Frank Erwin Center (13,203); Austin, TX
January 25, 2022; 8:00 p.m., ESPNU		at TCU	W 73–50	15–5 (5–3)	16 – Allen	9 – Bishop	5 – Mitchell	Schollmaier Arena (8,412); Fort Worth, TX
January 29, 2022*; 7:00 p.m., ESPN		No. 18 Tennessee; Big 12/SEC Challenge	W 52–51	16–5	18 – Ramey	6 – Allen	3 – tied	Frank Erwin Center (16,540); Austin, TX
February 1, 2022; 8:00 p.m., ESPN2	No. 23	at No. 14 Texas Tech	L 64–77	16–6 (5–4)	16 – Carr	8 – Bishop	4 – Carr	United Supermarkets Arena (15,300); Lubbock, TX
February 5, 2022; 1:00 p.m., LHN	No. 23	No. 20 Iowa State	W 63–41	17–6 (6–4)	14 – tied	8 – Allen	8 – Carr	Frank Erwin Center (13,656); Austin, TX
February 7, 2022; 8:00 p.m., ESPN	No. 20	No. 8 Kansas	W 79–76	18–6 (7–4)	24 – Allen	10 – Bishop	4 – Carr	Frank Erwin Center (14,688); Austin, TX
February 12, 2022; 11:00 a.m., ESPN2	No. 20	at No. 10 Baylor	L 63–80	18–7 (7–5)	11 – Jones	7 – Allen	5 – Carr	Ferrell Center (10,284); Waco, TX
February 15, 2022; 6:00 p.m., ESPN2	No. 20	at Oklahoma	W 80–78 ^{OT}	19–7 (8–5)	20 – tied	7 – Jones	3 – Bishop	Lloyd Noble Center (8,124); Norman, OK
February 19, 2022; 11:30 a.m., ABC	No. 20	No. 11 Texas Tech	L 55–61	19–8 (8–6)	20 – Jones	11 – Bishop	3 – Ramey	Frank Erwin Center (16,540); Austin, TX
February 23, 2022; 6:00 p.m., ESPN2	No. 20	TCU	W 75–66	20–8 (9—6)	21 – Jones	7 – tied	2 – tied	Frank Erwin Center (12,017); Austin, TX
February 26, 2022; 1:00 p.m., ESPN2	No. 20	at West Virginia	W 82–81	21–8 (10–6)	26 – Allen	10 – Allen	3 – Allen	WVU Coliseum (13,470); Morgantown, WV
February 28, 2022; 8:00 p.m., ESPN	No. 21	No. 3 Baylor	L 61–68	21–9 (10–7)	13 – tied	11 – Bishop	3 – Allen	Frank Erwin Center (16,450); Austin, TX
March 5, 2022; 3:00 p.m., ESPN	No. 21	at No. 6 Kansas	L 63–70 ^{OT}	21–10 (10–8)	18 – Ramey	7 – tied	4 – Allen	Allen Fieldhouse (16,300); Lawrence, KS
Big 12 Tournament
March 10, 2022; 11:30 a.m., ESPN2	(4) No. 22	vs. (5) TCU; Quarterfinals	L 60–65	21–11	16 – Allen	9 – tied	3 – tied	T-Mobile Center (N/A); Kansas City, MO
NCAA tournament
March 18, 2022; 4:30 p.m., TBS	(6 E) No. 25	vs. (11 E) Virginia Tech; First Round	W 81–73	22–11	21 – Jones	6 – Allen	9 – Carr	Fiserv Forum (17,500); Milwaukee, WI
March 20, 2022; 7:40 p.m., TNT	(6 E) No. 25	vs. (3 E) No. 10 Purdue; Second Round	L 71–81	22–12	23 – Carr	6 – tied	6 – Carr	Fiserv Forum (17,500); Milwaukee, WI
*Non-conference game. ^{#}Rankings from AP Poll. (#) Tournament seedings in parentheses. All times are in Central Time.

== Player statistics ==
Individual player statistics (Final)
				Minutes		Scoring		Total FGs			3-point FGs			Free-Throws			Rebounds								
#	Player	GP	GS	Tot	Avg	Pts	Avg	FG	FGA	Pct	3FG	3FA	Pct	FT	FTA	Pct	Off	Def	Tot	Avg	A	PF	TO	Stl	Blk
0	Timmy Allen	34	34	984:24	29.0	410	12.1	150	304	49.3%	4	15	26.7%	106	145	73.1%	88	129	217	6.4	71	84	64	42	14
1	Andrew Jones	33	20	868:33	26.3	371	11.2	129	312	41.3%	56	175	32.0%	57	70	81.4%	6	87	93	2.8	53	51	41	38	7
2	Marcus Carr	34	32	1047:59	30.8	386	11.4	128	325	39.4%	47	139	33.8%	83	108	76.9%	9	57	66	1.9	117	78	64	32	3
3	Courtney Ramey	34	32	1024:18	30.1	321	9.4	110	277	39.7%	49	140	35.0%	52	68	76.5%	16	104	120	3.5	53	70	40	35	7
4	Dylan Disu	26	0	283:33	10.9	97	3.7	41	88	46.6%	2	15	13.3%	13	16	81.3%	25	58	83	3.2	11	45	22	11	21
5	Devin Askew	34	3	503:34	14.8	72	2.1	26	65	40.0%	8	25	32.0%	12	22	54.5%	3	29	32	0.9	45	39	26	26	3
10	Cole Bott	0	0	0	0.0	0	0	0	0	0%	0	0	0%	0	0	0%	0	0	0	0.0	0	0	0	0	0
12	Tristen Licon	16	0	67:13	4.2	22	1.4	9	21	42.9%	4	10	40.0%	0	0	0%	1	6	7	0.4	1	5	1	5	0
13	Jase Febres	31	6	428:31	13.8	120	3.9	39	108	36.1%	27	82	32.9%	15	20	75.0%	11	35	46	1.5	12	41	11	10	8
20	Jaylon Tyson	8	0	56:13	7.0	14	1.8	6	15	40%	0	4	0%	2	3	66.7%	2	7	9	1.1	3	6	3	4	2
21	Avery Benson	16	0	59:53	3.7	1	0.1	0	4	0%	0	1	0%	1	2	50.0%	4	4	8	0.5	5	4	0	1	0
30	Brock Cunningham	34	3	403:03	11.9	78	2.3	27	56	48.2%	11	23	47.8%	13	16	81.3%	31	46	77	2.3	22	72	10	24	3
31	Gavin Perryman	0	0	0	0.0	0	0	0	0	0%	0	0	0%	0	0	0%	0	0	0	0.0	0	0	0	0	0
32	Christian Bishop	34	23	673:18	19.8	238	7.0	90	150	60.0%	2	6	33.3%	56	83	67.5%	84	106	190	5.6	25	72	43	16	31
33	Tre Mitchell	24	17	449:28	18.7	209	8.7	77	161	47.8%	15	46	32.6%	40	50	80%	30	65	95	4.0	32	41	35	17	16
	Total	34	34	6850	–	2339	68.8	832	1886	44.1%	25	681	33.0%	450	603	74.6%	355	776	1131	33.3	450	608	392	261	115
	Opponents	34	34	6850	–	2062	60.6	712	1708	41.7%	183	573	31.9%	455	668	68.1%	328	767	1095	32.2	314	608	506	196	111

Legend
GP	Games played	GS	Games started	Avg	Average per game
FG	Field-goals made	FGA	Field-goal attempts	Off	Offensive rebounds
Def	Defensive rebounds	A	Assists	TO	Turnovers
Blk	Blocks	Stl	Steals	High	Team high

== Awards and honors ==
Weekly honors
Honors	Player	Position	Date Awarded	Ref.
Big 12 Newcomer of the Week	Tre Mitchell	F	November 22, 2021	
Big 12 Newcomer of the Week	Timmy Allen	F	February 28, 2022	

Conference honors
Honors	Player	Position
All-Big 12 Second Team; Big 12 All-Newcomer Team	Timmy Allen	F
All-Big 12 Third Team	Marcus Carr	G
All-Big 12 Honorable Mention	Christian Bishop	F
All-Big 12 Honorable Mention	Andrew Jones	G
All-Big 12 Honorable Mention	Courtney Ramey	G

National honors
Honors	Player	Position	Date Awarded	Ref.
USBWA Most Courageous Award	Andrew Jones	G	March 11, 2022	

National honors
Honors	Player	Position
USBWA District 8 Second Team	Timmy Allen	F
USBWA District VII Team	Timmy Allen	F
NABC All-District 8 Second Team	Timmy Allen	F

== Rankings ==
Ranking movements Legend: ██ Increase in ranking ██ Decrease in ranking — = Not ranked RV = Received votes
	Week																			
Poll	Pre	1	2	3	4	5	6	7	8	9	10	11	12	13	14	15	16	17	18	Final
AP	5	8	8	7	7	17	16	17	14	21	23	RV	23	20	20	20	21	22	25	Not released
Coaches	5	5^	8	8	11	17	17	18	16	22	22	25	21	20	20	22	21	22	25	—

^Coaches did not release a Week 1 poll.

== See also ==
2021–22 Texas Longhorns women's basketball team
