= 2017–18 Texas Longhorns men's basketball team =

American college basketball season

2017–18 Texas Longhorns men's basketball

NCAA tournament, First Round
- Conference: Big 12 Conference
- Record: 19–15 (8–10 Big 12)
- Head coach: Shaka Smart (3rd season)
- Assistant coaches: Darrin Horn; Jai Lucas; Mike Morell
- Home arena: Frank Erwin Center

2017–18 Big 12 men's basketball standings
| | Conf. | | | | Overall |
| Team | W | | L | PCT | W | | L | PCT |
|---|---|---|---|---|---|---|---|---|
| No. 4 Kansas † | 13 | – | 5 | .722 | 31 | – | 8 | .795 |
| No. 14 Texas Tech | 11 | – | 7 | .611 | 27 | – | 10 | .730 |
| No. 15 West Virginia | 11 | – | 7 | .611 | 26 | – | 11 | .703 |
| Kansas State | 10 | – | 8 | .556 | 25 | – | 12 | .676 |
| TCU | 9 | – | 9 | .500 | 21 | – | 12 | .636 |
| Baylor | 8 | – | 10 | .444 | 19 | – | 15 | .559 |
| Texas | 8 | – | 10 | .444 | 19 | – | 15 | .559 |
| Oklahoma State | 8 | – | 10 | .444 | 21 | – | 15 | .583 |
| Oklahoma | 8 | – | 10 | .444 | 18 | – | 14 | .563 |
| Iowa State | 4 | – | 14 | .222 | 13 | – | 18 | .419 |
† 2018 Big 12 Tournament winner Rankings from AP poll

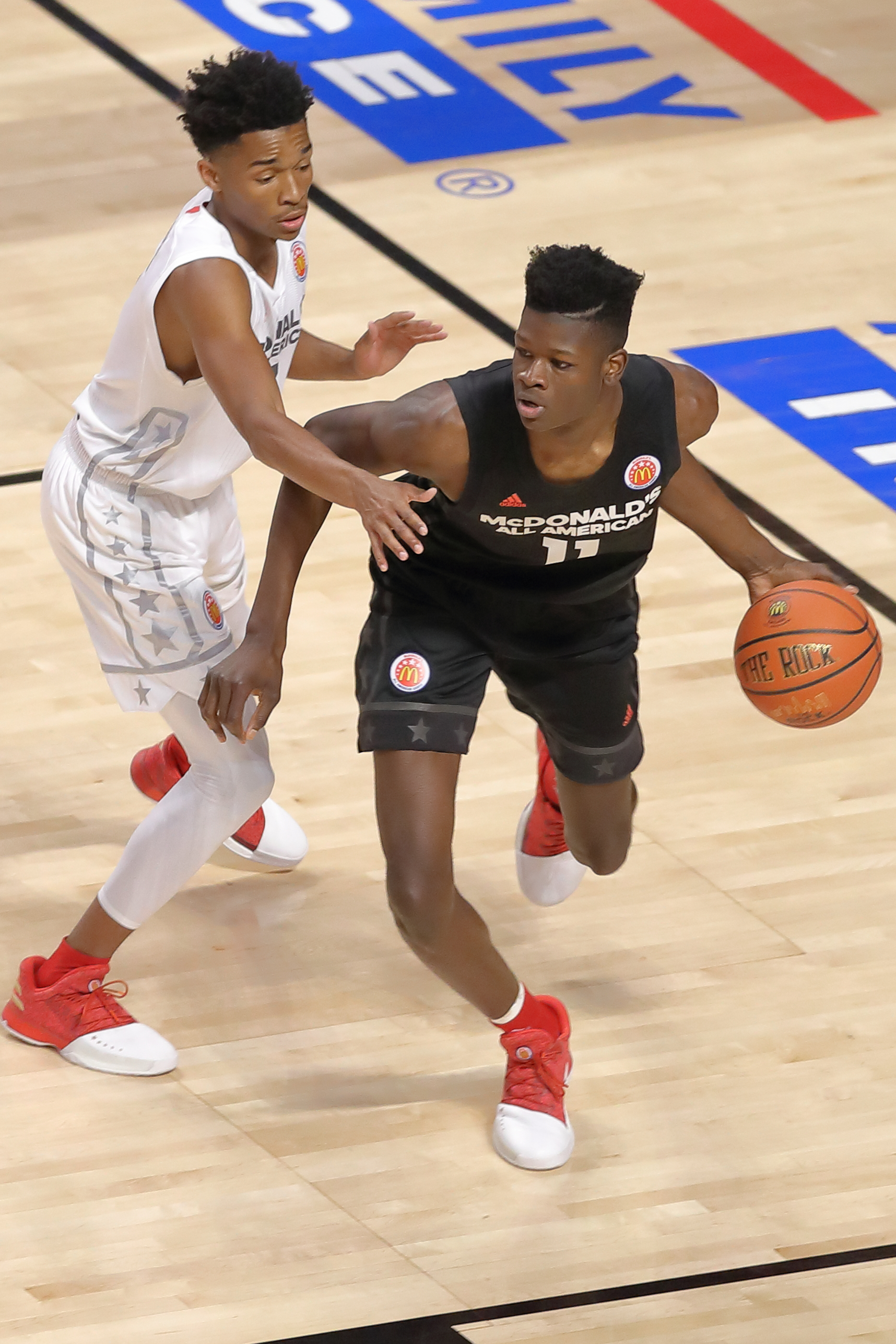
Texas recruit Mo Bamba at the 2017 McDonald's All-American Boys Game

The 2017–18 Texas Longhorns men's basketball team represented the University of Texas at Austin in the 2017–18 NCAA Division I men's basketball season. They were led by third-year head coach Shaka Smart, and played their home games at the Frank Erwin Center in Austin, Texas as members of the Big 12 Conference. They finished the season 19–15, 8–10 in Big 12 play to finish in seventh place. They defeated Iowa State in the first round of the Big 12 tournament before losing to Texas Tech in the quarterfinals. They received an at-large bid to the NCAA tournament as the No. 10 seed in the South region, where they lost to Nevada in the first round 87–83 in OT.

== Previous season ==
The Longhorns finished the 2016–17 season 11–22, 4–14 in Big 12 play to finish in last place. They defeated Texas Tech in the first round of the Big 12 tournament to advance to the quarterfinals, where they lost to West Virginia.

== Offseason ==
=== Departures ===
| Name | Number | Pos. | Height | Weight | Year | Hometown | Reason for departure |
|---|---|---|---|---|---|---|---|
| Tevin Mack | 0 | G/F | 6'6" | 220 | Sophomore | Columbia, SC | Transferred to Alabama |
| Kendal Yancy | 5 | G | 6'3" | 210 | Senior | Richardson, TX | Graduated |
| Mareik Isom | 14 | F | 6'9" | 217 | RS senior | Austin, TX | Graduated |
| Jarrett Allen | 31 | C | 6'11" | 235 | Freshman | Austin, TX | Declared for the 2017 NBA draft; selected 22nd overall by the Brooklyn Nets |
| Shaquille Cleare | 32 | F | 6'8" | 275 | Senior | Andros, BS | Graduated |

=== Incoming transfers ===
| Name | Number | Pos. | Height | Weight | Year | Hometown | Notes |
|---|---|---|---|---|---|---|---|
| Elijah Mitrou-Long | 55 | G | 6'0" | 175 | Junior | Mississauga, ON | Transferred from Mount St. Mary's. Under NCAA transfer rules, Long had to sit out for the 2017–18 season. Had two years of remaining eligibility. |

=== 2017 recruiting class ===
College recruiting
| Name | Hometown | School | Height | Weight | Commit date |
|---|---|---|---|---|---|
| Mo Bamba #2 C | Harlem, NY | Westtown School | 7 ft 0 in (2.13 m) | 216 lb (98 kg) | May 18, 2017 |
| Mo Bamba #2 C | Recruit ratings: Scout: Rivals: 247Sports: ESPN: | | | | |
| Matt Coleman III #6 PG | Norfolk, VA | Oak Hill Academy | 6 ft 1 in (1.85 m) | 170 lb (77 kg) | Jan 16, 2017 |
| Matt Coleman III #6 PG | Recruit ratings: Scout: Rivals: 247Sports: ESPN: | | | | |
| Jericho Sims #10 C | Minneapolis, MN | Cristo Rey Jesuit High School | 6 ft 8 in (2.03 m) | 190 lb (86 kg) | Aug 30, 2016 |
| Jericho Sims #10 C | Recruit ratings: Scout: Rivals: 247Sports: ESPN: | | | | |
| Royce Hamm #13 PF | Houston, TX | Aldine High School | 6 ft 8 in (2.03 m) | 205 lb (93 kg) | Jul 1, 2016 |
| Royce Hamm #13 PF | Recruit ratings: Scout: Rivals: 247Sports: ESPN: | | | | |
| Jase Febres #29 SG | Houston, TX | Westfield High School | 6 ft 5 in (1.96 m) | 180 lb (82 kg) | Sep 30, 2016 |
| Jase Febres #29 SG | Recruit ratings: Scout: Rivals: 247Sports: ESPN: | | | | |
Overall recruit ranking: Scout: 7 Rivals: 14 247Sports: 6 ESPN: 27
Note: In many cases, Scout, Rivals, 247Sports, On3, and ESPN may conflict in their listings of height and weight.; In these cases, the average was taken. ESPN grades are on a 100-point scale.; Sources: "2017 Texas Basketball Commitment List". Rivals.; "2017 Texas Basketball Recruiting Prospects". Scout.; "2017 Player Commits". ESPN.; "Scout.com Team Recruiting Rankings". Scout.; "2017 Team Ranking". Rivals.; "2017–18 Texas Longhorns men's basketball team". 247Sports.

=== 2018 recruiting class ===
College recruiting (2018)
| Name | Hometown | School | Height | Weight | Commit date |
|---|---|---|---|---|---|
| Gerald Liddell #11 SF | Cibolo, TX | Byron P. Steele II High School | 6 ft 7 in (2.01 m) | 180 lb (82 kg) | Aug 10, 2017 |
| Gerald Liddell #11 SF | Recruit ratings: Scout: Rivals: 247Sports: ESPN: | | | | |
| Courtney Ramey #11 PG | St. Louis, MO | Webster Groves High School | 6 ft 3 in (1.91 m) | 170 lb (77 kg) | Apr 27, 2018 |
| Courtney Ramey #11 PG | Recruit ratings: Scout: Rivals: 247Sports: ESPN: | | | | |
| Kamaka Hepa #13 PF | Barrow, AK | Jefferson High School | 6 ft 9 in (2.06 m) | 210 lb (95 kg) | Oct 31, 2017 |
| Kamaka Hepa #13 PF | Recruit ratings: Scout: Rivals: 247Sports: ESPN: | | | | |
| Jaxson Hayes #9 C | Loveland, OH | Moeller High School | 6 ft 10 in (2.08 m) | 200 lb (91 kg) | Sep 29, 2017 |
| Jaxson Hayes #9 C | Recruit ratings: Scout: Rivals: 247Sports: ESPN: | | | | |
| Brock Cunningham #41 PF | Austin, TX | Westlake High School | 6 ft 7 in (2.01 m) | 205 lb (93 kg) | Aug 4, 2017 |
| Brock Cunningham #41 PF | Recruit ratings: Scout: Rivals: 247Sports: ESPN: | | | | |
Overall recruit ranking: Scout: 8 Rivals: 9 247Sports: 8 ESPN: 13
Note: In many cases, Scout, Rivals, 247Sports, On3, and ESPN may conflict in their listings of height and weight.; In these cases, the average was taken. ESPN grades are on a 100-point scale.; Sources: "2018 Texas Basketball Commitment List". Rivals.; "Texas 2018 Basketball Commits". Scout.; "2018 Player Commits". ESPN.; "Scout.com Team Recruiting Rankings". Scout.; "2018 Team Ranking". Rivals.

== Roster ==
2017–18 Texas Longhorns men's basketball team
Players
Coaches

| Pos. | # | Name | Height | Weight | Year | Previous school | Hometown |
|---|---|---|---|---|---|---|---|
| C | 00 | James Banks III | 6 ft 10 in (2.08 m) | 240 lb (109 kg) | So | La Lumiere | Decatur, GA |
| G | 1 | Andrew Jones | 6 ft 4 in (1.93 m) | 195 lb (88 kg) | So | MacArthur | Irving, TX |
| G | 2 | Matt Coleman III | 6 ft 2 in (1.88 m) | 180 lb (82 kg) | Fr | Oak Hill Academy | Norfolk, VA |
| G | 3 | Jacob Young | 6 ft 2 in (1.88 m) | 185 lb (84 kg) | So | Yates | Houston, TX |
| C | 4 | Mo Bamba | 7 ft 0 in (2.13 m) | 225 lb (102 kg) | Fr | Westtown School | Harlem, NY |
| F | 5 | Royce Hamm Jr. | 6 ft 8 in (2.03 m) | 230 lb (104 kg) | Fr | Aldine Davis | Houston, TX |
| G | 10 | Eric Davis Jr. | 6 ft 3 in (1.91 m) | 190 lb (86 kg) | Jr | Arthur Hill | Saginaw, MI |
| G | 12 | Kerwin Roach | 6 ft 4 in (1.93 m) | 180 lb (82 kg) | Jr | North Shore | Houston, TX |
| G | 13 | Jase Febres | 6 ft 5 in (1.96 m) | 190 lb (86 kg) | Fr | Westfield | Houston, TX |
| C | 20 | Jericho Sims | 6 ft 9 in (2.06 m) | 240 lb (109 kg) | Fr | Cristo Rey Jesuit | Minneapolis, MN |
| F | 21 | Dylan Osetkowski | 6 ft 9 in (2.06 m) | 245 lb (111 kg) | RS Jr | JSerra Catholic; Tulane | San Diego, CA |
| G | 22 | Isaiah Hobbs | 6 ft 3 in (1.91 m) | 190 lb (86 kg) | Sr | Lake Worth Christian | Palm Beach, FL |
| G | 25 | Joe Schwartz (W) | 6 ft 2 in (1.88 m) | 190 lb (86 kg) | Sr | Vanguard College Prep | Waco, TX |
| F | 30 | Ryan McClurg (W) | 6 ft 6 in (1.98 m) | 235 lb (107 kg) | RS Sr | Seven Lakes | Katy, TX |
| G | 55 | Elijah Mitrou-Long (redshirt) | 6 ft 1 in (1.85 m) | 185 lb (84 kg) | Jr | The John Carroll School; Mount St. Mary's | Mississauga, ON |

Head coach

- Shaka Smart (Kenyon)

Assistant coach(es)

- Darrin Horn (Western Kentucky)
- Jai Lucas (Texas)
- Mike Morell (Milligan)

Legend

- (C) Team captain
- (S) Suspended
- (I) Ineligible
- (W) Walk-on
- Injured
- Current redshirt

Roster

== Schedule and results ==
| Date time, TV | Rank^{#} | Opponent^{#} | Result | Record | Site (attendance) city, state |
Exhibition
| Oct 25, 2017*; 7:00 pm | | vs. Texas A&M; Hurricane Harvey relief game | W 73–69 | | Tudor Fieldhouse (2,048); Houston, TX |
Regular season
| Nov 10, 2017*; 7:15 pm, LHN | | Northwestern State | W 105–59 | 1–0 | Frank Erwin Center (9,516); Austin, TX |
| Nov 14, 2017*; 7:00 pm, LHN | | New Hampshire; Phil Knight Invitational opening round | W 78–60 | 2–0 | Frank Erwin Center (8,465); Austin, TX |
| Nov 18, 2017*; 4:00 pm, LHN | | Lipscomb | W 80–57 | 3–0 | Frank Erwin Center (8,592); Austin, TX |
| Nov 23, 2017*; 6:00 pm, ESPN2 | | vs. Butler; Phil Knight Invitational Motion Bracket quarterfinals | W 61–48 | 4–0 | Veterans Memorial Coliseum (6,955); Portland, OR |
| Nov 24, 2017*; 4:30 pm, ESPN | | vs. No. 1 Duke; Phil Knight Invitational Motion Bracket semifinals | L 78–85 ^{OT} | 4–1 | Moda Center (13,746); Portland, OR |
| Nov 26, 2017*; 12:00 pm, ESPN | | vs. No. 17 Gonzaga; Phil Knight Invitational Motion Bracket 3rd place game | L 71–76 ^{OT} | 4–2 | Moda Center (15,365); Portland, OR |
| Nov 29, 2017*; 7:00 pm, LHN | | Florida A&M | W 82–58 | 5–2 | Frank Erwin Center (8,511); Austin, TX |
| Dec 5, 2017*; 6:00 pm, ESPN2 | | at VCU | W 71–67 | 6–2 | Siegel Center (7,637); Richmond, VA |
| Dec 12, 2017*; 8:00 pm, ESPN2 | | Michigan | L 52–59 | 6–3 | Frank Erwin Center (12,504); Austin, TX |
| Dec 16, 2017*; 1:00 pm, LHN | | Louisiana Tech | W 75–60 | 7–3 | Frank Erwin Center (8,828); Austin, TX |
| Dec 18, 2017*; 8:00 pm, ESPN2 | | Tennessee State | W 47–46 | 8–3 | Frank Erwin Center (8,218); Austin, TX |
| Dec 22, 2017*; 8:00 pm, ESPN2 | | vs. Alabama; Vulcan Classic | W 66–50 | 9–3 | Legacy Arena (16,146); Birmingham, AL |
| Dec 29, 2017; 8:00 pm, ESPN2 | | No. 11 Kansas | L 86–92 | 9–4 (0–1) | Frank Erwin Center (15,802); Austin, TX |
| Jan 1, 2018; 6:00 pm, ESPNU | | at Iowa State | W 74–70 ^{OT} | 10–4 (1–1) | Hilton Coliseum (14,131); Ames, IA |
| Jan 6, 2018; 1:00 pm, ESPNU | | at Baylor | L 60–69 | 10–5 (1–2) | Ferrell Center (7,119); Waco, TX |
| Jan 10, 2018; 8:00 pm, ESPNU | | No. 16 TCU | W 99–98 ^{2OT} | 11–5 (2–2) | Frank Erwin Center (9,736); Fort Worth, TX |
| Jan 13, 2018; 4:00 pm, ESPNews | | at Oklahoma State | L 64–65 | 11–6 (2–3) | Gallagher-Iba Arena (6,707); Stillwater, OK |
| Jan 17, 2018; 7:00 pm, LHN | | No. 8 Texas Tech | W 67–58 | 12–6 (3–3) | Frank Erwin Center (12,396); Austin, TX |
| Jan 20, 2018; 1:00 pm, CBS | | at No. 6 West Virginia | L 51–86 | 12–7 (3–4) | WVU Coliseum (14,001); Morgantown, WV |
| Jan 22, 2018; 6:00 pm, ESPN2 | | Iowa State | W 73–57 | 13–7 (4–4) | Frank Erwin Center (9,123); Austin, TX |
| Jan 27, 2018*; 1:00 pm, ESPN2 | | Ole Miss; Big 12/SEC Challenge | W 85–72 | 14–7 | Frank Erwin Center (10,913); Austin, TX |
| Jan 31, 2018; 8:00 pm, ESPNU | | at No. 10 Texas Tech | L 71–73 ^{OT} | 14–8 (4–5) | United Supermarkets Arena (15,098); Lubbock, TX |
| Feb 3, 2018; 5:15 pm, ESPN | | No. 12 Oklahoma; College Gameday | W 79–74 | 15–8 (5–5) | Frank Erwin Center (15,533); Austin, TX |
| Feb 7, 2018; 7:00 pm, LHN | | Kansas State | L 64–67 | 15–9 (5–6) | Frank Erwin Center (9,211); Austin, TX |
| Feb 10, 2018; 1:00 pm, ESPNU | | at TCU | L 71–87 | 15–10 (5–7) | Schollmaier Arena (6,549); Fort WOrth, TX |
| Feb 12, 2018; 8:00 pm, ESPN | | Baylor | L 73–74 ^{2OT} | 15–11 (5–8) | Frank Erwin Center (9,204); Austin, TX |
| Feb 17 2018; 11:00 am, ESPN | | at No. 23 Oklahoma | W 77–66 | 16–11 (6–8) | Lloyd Noble Center (11,645); Norman, OK |
| Feb 21, 2018; 7:00 pm, ESPNU | | at Kansas State | L 48–58 | 16–12 (6–9) | Bramlage Coliseum (8,623); Manhattan, KS |
| Feb 24, 2018; 1:00 pm, LHN | | Oklahoma State | W 65–64 | 17–12 (7–9) | Frank Erwin Center (12,316); Fort Worth, TX |
| Feb 26, 2018; 8:00 pm, ESPN | | at No. 6 Kansas | L 70–80 | 17–13 (7–10) | Allen Fieldhouse (16,300); Lawrence, KS |
| Mar 3, 2018; 11:00 am, ESPN | | No. 20 West Virginia | W 87–79 ^{OT} | 18–13 (8–10) | Frank Erwin Center (11,364); Austin, TX |
Big 12 Tournament
| Mar 7, 2018; 8:00 pm, ESPNU | (7) | vs. (10) Iowa State; First Round | W 68–64 | 19–13 | Sprint Center (17,752); Kansas City, MO |
| Mar 8, 2018; 6:00 pm, ESPN2 | (7) | vs. (2) No. 14 Texas Tech; Quarterfinals | L 69–73 | 19–14 | Sprint Center (17,653); Kansas City, MO |
NCAA tournament
| Mar 16, 2018*; 3:30 pm, TBS | (10 S) | vs. (7 S) No. 24 Nevada; First Round | L 83–87 ^{OT} | 19–15 | Bridgestone Arena (17,552); Nashville, TN |
*Non-conference game. ^{#}Rankings from AP Poll. (#) Tournament seedings in parentheses. S=South. All times are in Central Time.

== Rankings ==
Ranking movements Legend: ██ Increase in ranking ██ Decrease in ranking — = Not ranked RV = Received votes
| | Week | | | | | | | | | | | | | | | | | | | |
| Poll | Pre | 1 | 2 | 3 | 4 | 5 | 6 | 7 | 8 | 9 | 10 | 11 | 12 | 13 | 14 | 15 | 16 | 17 | 18 | Final |
|---|---|---|---|---|---|---|---|---|---|---|---|---|---|---|---|---|---|---|---|---|
| AP | RV | RV | RV | RV | RV | RV | RV | RV | RV | — | — | — | — | RV | — | — | — | — | — | Not released |
| Coaches | RV | RV | RV | RV | RV | RV | RV | RV | RV | — | — | — | — | RV | — | — | — | — | — | — |

*AP does not release post-NCAA tournament rankings

== See also ==
- 2017–18 Texas Longhorns women's basketball team
