= HEPA (disambiguation) =

HEPA is a standard for air filters.

HEPA may also refer to:

- Health–enhancing physical activity; see Exercise
- HepA, or Hepatitis A, a disease of the liver
- Kamaka Hepa, basketball player
