= Andrew Jones (basketball) =

American basketball player (born 1997)

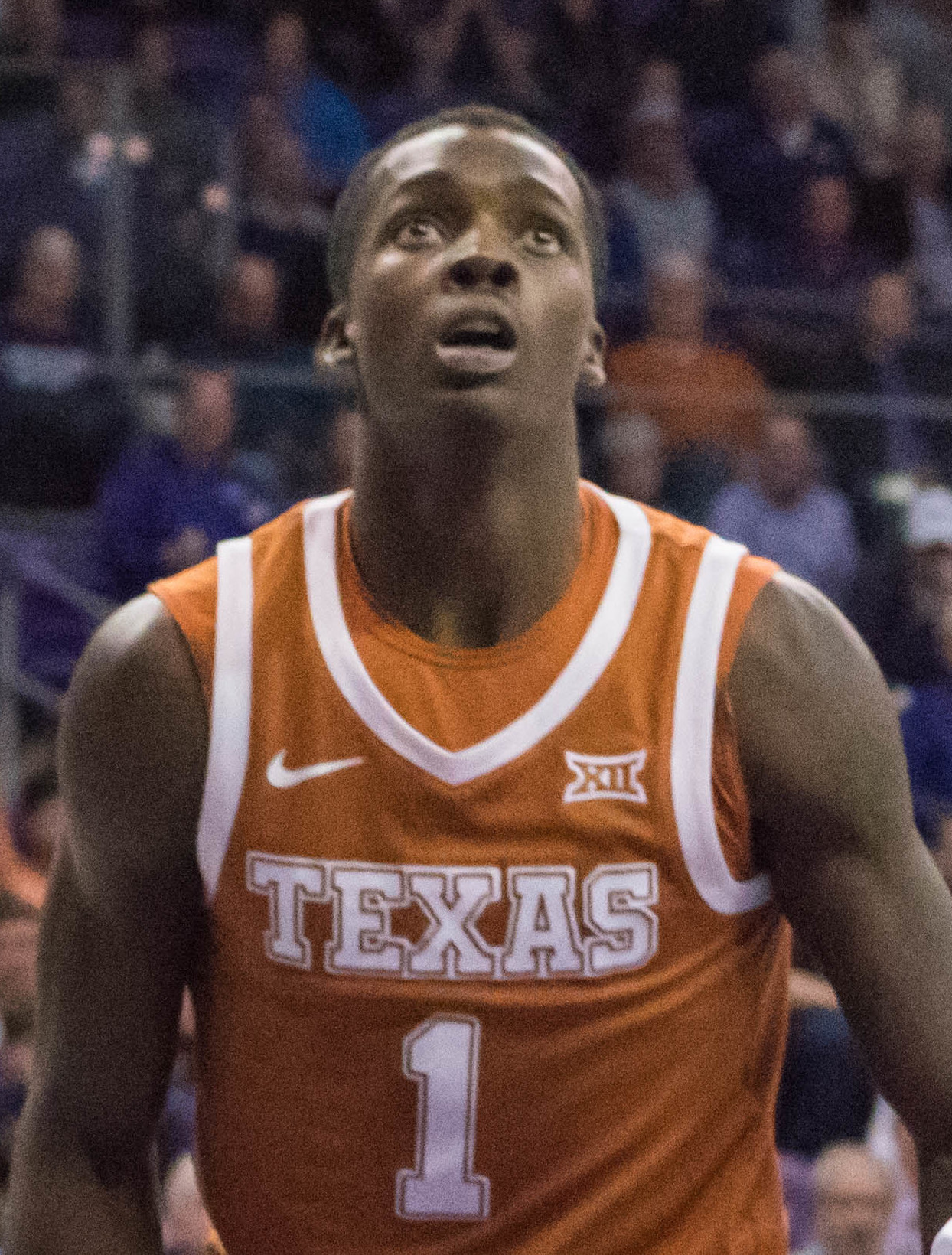
- Jones with Texas in 2020

No. 1 – Kapfenberg Bulls
- Position: Shooting guard
- League: Austrian Basketball Superliga

Personal information
- Born: December 9, 1997 (age 28) Midland, Texas, U.S.
- Listed height: 6 ft 4 in (1.93 m)
- Listed weight: 190 lb (86 kg)

Career information
- High school: MacArthur (Irving, Texas)
- College: Texas (2016–2022)
- NBA draft: 2022: undrafted
- Playing career: 2022–present

Career history
- 2022–2023: SC Rasta Vechta
- 2024: BC Orchies
- 2024: Álftanes
- 2025–present: Kapfenberg Bulls
- 2025: Nelson Giants

Career highlights
- ProA champion (2023); Perry Wallace Most Courageous Award (2022); NIT champion (2019); Second-team All-Big 12 (2021); McDonald's All-American (2016)

Andrew Jones (born December 9, 1997) is an American professional basketball player for the Kapfenberg Bulls of the Austrian Basketball Superliga. He played college basketball for the Texas Longhorns of the Big 12 Conference.

== Early life ==
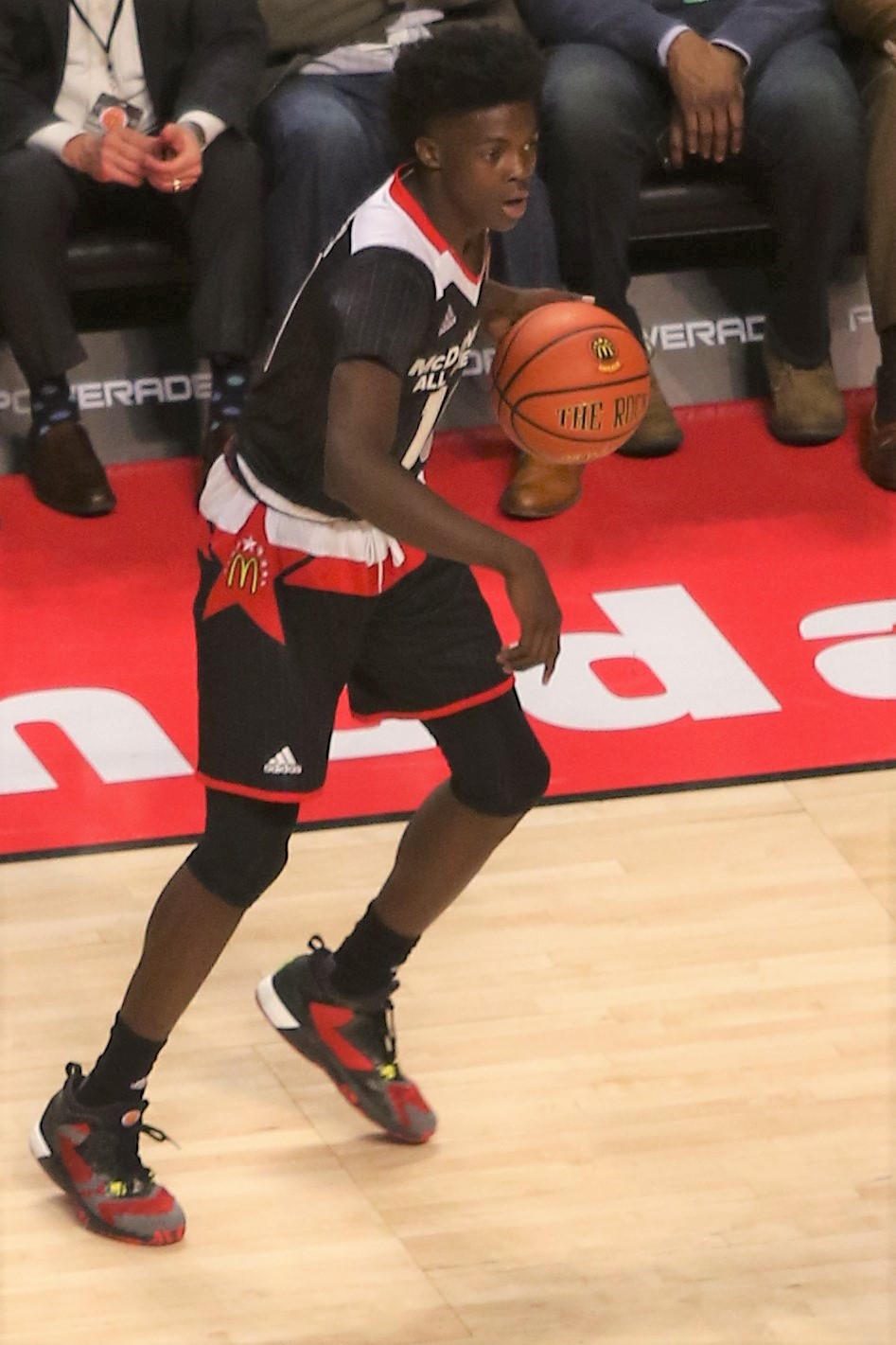
Jones at the 2016 McDonald's All-American Game

Jones was born in Midland, Texas, and moved with his family to Irving, Texas, at age seven. When Jones was in second grade, he suffered minor bruises in a car accident near Sweetwater, Texas, that left his sister, Alexis, with a broken wrist and his father, David, paralyzed from his chest down. Due to his father's disability, Jones learned to cook and care for his father. He played basketball for MacArthur High School in Irving, where as a senior he averaged 30 points, 10 rebounds and seven assists per game and led his team to a 22–7 record. Jones played in the McDonald's All-American Game and Jordan Brand Classic. A four-star recruit, he committed to Texas on December 14, 2015, over Arizona, Baylor, Louisville, Oklahoma State, and Texas A&M, among others. He credited his commitment to a strong relationship with coach Shaka Smart.

== College career ==
On February 25, 2017, Jones scored a freshman season-high 18 points in a 77–67 loss to third-ranked Kansas. As a freshman, he started in 23 games and averaged 11.4 points, 3.9 rebounds, 3.6 assists and 1.2 steals per game. At the end of the season, Jones took part in the NBA Draft Combine and team workouts before ultimately withdrawing from the 2017 NBA draft.

On December 5, 2017, as a sophomore, Jones scored a season-high 19 points in a 71–67 win over VCU but left with a right wrist injury in the final minutes. In his next two games, he played limited minutes because he felt tired, prompting Texas to send him for tests. On January 10, 2018, it was announced that Jones was diagnosed for leukemia. He was honored by several other schools and received more than $130,000 in donations for his medical expenses from a fundraising website set up by the Texas athletic department. Jones went to the University of Texas MD Anderson Cancer Center for treatment, and after being released in late February, he finished outpatient treatment in August. While recovering, Jones missed the second half of his sophomore season and was granted medical redshirts for both the 2017–18 and 2018–19 seasons. On October 13, 2018, he suffered a fractured toe in practice, shortly after his return to the team. He returned to action on November 6, scoring one point in nine minutes in a 71–59 victory over Eastern Illinois, one of his two appearances in the season.

Jones made his redshirt sophomore season debut on November 5, 2019, scoring a then-career-high 20 points in a 69–45 win over Northern Colorado. He established a new career high on February 19, 2020, after recording 21 points in a 70–56 victory over TCU. On March 2, Jones was named Big 12 Conference Co-Player of the Week after scoring a career-high 22 points twice in wins over West Virginia and Texas Tech. By the end of the season, he was averaging 11.5 points, 2.3 rebounds and 1.8 assists per game and was named All-Big 12 honorable mention. He reached double figures in scoring 15 times on the season.

Jones chose to return for a sixth season in 2021–22 after the NCAA ruled that the 2020–21 season, heavily disrupted by COVID-19, would not be counted against the athletic eligibility of any basketball player. At the end of that season, he was named as one of two recipients of the Perry Wallace Most Courageous Award, presented by the United States Basketball Writers Association to one or more individuals associated with men's college basketball who have exhibited extraordinary courage on and off the court. Both Jones and his fellow recipient, Justin Hardy of NCAA Division III Washington (MO), averaged double figures in scoring during the season while battling cancer (with Hardy battling stomach cancer).

== Professional career ==
On July 20, 2022, Jones signed with SC Rasta Vechta of the German ProA. He helped Rasta Vechta win the 2022–23 ProA championship, averaging 10.1 points in 43 games. He re-signed with Rasta Vechta in August 2023, but left the team the following month.

In January 2024, Jones joined BC Orchies of the French Nationale Masculine 1. In 18 games to finish the 2023–24 season, he averaged 17.2 points, 4.3 rebounds, 2.6 assists and 1.8 steals per game.

In June 2024, Jones signed with Álftanes of the Icelandic Úrvalsdeild karla. He left the club in December 2024. In 10 games, he averaged 19.3 points, 4.7 rebounds, 3.5 assists and 1.1 steals per game.

In January 2025, Jones joined the Kapfenberg Bulls of the Austrian Basketball Superliga. In 15 games to finish the 2024–25 season, he averaged 17.2 points, 4.9 rebounds, 2.3 assists and 1.1 steals per game.

On May 14, 2025, Jones joined the Nelson Giants of the New Zealand National Basketball League for the rest of the 2025 season.

Jones re-joined the Kapfenberg Bulls for the 2025–26 season.

== Career statistics ==
Legend
GP	Games played	GS	Games started	MPG	Minutes per game
FG%	Field goal percentage	3P%	3-point field goal percentage	FT%	Free throw percentage
RPG	Rebounds per game	APG	Assists per game	SPG	Steals per game
BPG	Blocks per game	PPG	Points per game	**Bold**	Career high

=== College ===
Year	Team	GP	GS	MPG	FG%	3P%	FT%	RPG	APG	SPG	BPG	PPG
2016–17	Texas	**33**	23	27.9	.425	.328	.775	3.9	**3.5**	**1.2**	**.4**	11.4
2017–18	Texas	10	8	22.6	**.522**	**.463**	.733	2.4	2.0	.6	.2	13.5
2018–19	Texas	2	0	5.5	.000	.000	.750	1.0	.5	.5	.0	1.5
2019–20	Texas	31	11	26.5	.410	.383	.722	2.3	1.9	.7	.2	11.5
2020–21	Texas	26	**26**	**31.4**	.404	.338	**.831**	**4.5**	2.3	1.0	.1	**14.6**
2021–22	Texas	**33**	20	26.3	.413	.320	.814	2.8	1.6	**1.2**	.2	11.2
Career		135	88	27.1	.419	.348	.785	3.2	2.3	1.0	.2	12.0

== Personal life ==
Jones is a Christian. Jones' older sister, Alexis, plays in the Women's National Basketball Association (WNBA). A decorated basketball player at MacArthur High School, she played for Duke and Baylor at the collegiate level, before winning a WNBA championship with the Minnesota Lynx. His favorite subject in high school was mathematics, and he said “I like dealing with numbers and money,” adding that it would help him with the business side of basketball.
