= Tre Mitchell =

American basketball player (born 2000)

No. 33 – KK Cibona
- Position: Power forward / center
- League: Croatian League

Personal information
- Born: September 24, 2000 (age 26) Pittsburgh, Pennsylvania, U.S.
- Listed height: 6 ft 9 in (2.06 m)
- Listed weight: 231 lb (105 kg)

Career information
- High school: Elizabeth Forward (Elizabeth, Pennsylvania); Woodstock Academy (Woodstock, Connecticut)
- College: UMass (2019–2021); Texas (2021–2022); West Virginia (2022–2023); Kentucky (2023–2024)
- NBA draft: 2024: undrafted
- Playing career: 2024–present

Career history
- 2024–2025: Löwen Braunschweig
- 2025–2026: JL Bourg
- 2026-present: Cibona Zagreb

Career highlights
- EuroCup champion (2026); First-team All-Atlantic 10 (2021); Second-team All-Atlantic 10 (2020); Atlantic 10 Rookie of the Year (2020); Atlantic 10 All-Rookie Team (2020)

Vincent Trevon Mitchell (born September 24, 2000) is an American professional basketball player for KK Cibona of the Croatian League. He played college basketball for the UMass Minutemen, Texas Longhorns, West Virginia Mountaineers, and Kentucky Wildcats.

== High school career ==
In his first two years of high school, Mitchell played for Elizabeth Forward High School in Elizabeth, Pennsylvania, before transferring to Woodstock Academy in Woodstock, Connecticut. As a senior, he averaged 16.6 points, 13.5 rebounds, 3.6 assists and 2.6 blocks per game, leading his team to a 39–2 record and the National Prep Championship quarterfinals. Mitchell was named Connecticut Gatorade Player of the Year. He was selected as Power 5 Conference AAA Player of the Year and Hoophall Classic Most Valuable Player honors in both of his years at Woodstock. Mitchell competed for Expressions Elite on the Amateur Athletic Union circuit. He was a consensus four-star recruit and committed to play college basketball for UMass over offers from Georgia Tech, Indiana, Providence, Syracuse and Virginia Tech, among others.

== College career ==
=== Freshman year (2019–2020) ===
Mitchell scored 30 points on February 4, 2020, in a 73–67 loss to Rhode Island. On February 22, Mitchell recorded 15 points and a freshman season-high 19 rebounds in a 57–49 win over Fordham. In his final game of the season, on March 7, he posted a season-high 34 points and 12 rebounds in a 64–63 loss to Rhode Island. As a freshman, Mitchell led his team with 17.7 points and 7.2 rebounds per game. He set a school freshman record for field goals and finished eight points shy of Jim McCoy's school freshman scoring record. Mitchell was a six-time Atlantic 10 Rookie of the Week and won the award for the final five weeks of the regular season, the longest streak since Lamar Odom in the 1998–99 season. He also earned Atlantic 10 Rookie of the Year and Second Team All-Atlantic 10 honors, becoming the first UMass freshman to receive all-conference honors since Marcus Camby in 1994.

=== Sophomore year (2020–2021) ===
As a sophomore, Mitchell averaged 18.8 points and 7.2 rebounds per game. He was named to the First Team All-Atlantic 10. At the end of the season he entered the transfer portal.

=== Junior year (2021–2022) ===
Mitchell transferred to Texas after his sophomore season. As a junior, he averaged 8.7 points and four rebounds per game. On February 15, 2022, the program announced that Mitchell would take an indefinite leave of absence from the team; he missed the rest of the season.

=== Senior year (2022–2023) ===
Following the season, Mitchell again entered the transfer portal, and later committed to West Virginia. As a senior, he averaged 11.7 points and 5.5 rebounds per game. After one season playing for West Virginia, Mitchell entered the transfer portal following the resignation of head coach Bob Huggins in June 2023.

=== Graduate year (2023-2024) ===
Mitchell announced he was transferring to Kentucky in June for his final year of NCAA eligibility. He averaged 10.7 points, 7.2 rebounds, and 2.6 assists per game in 30.2 minutes a game. After the season, Mitchell entered the NBA Draft.

== Professional career ==
Mitchell went undrafted in the 2024 NBA Draft. He signed a Summer League deal with the Oklahoma City Thunder.

On August 7, 2024, he signed with Löwen Braunschweig of the Basketball Bundesliga.

On July 10, 2025, he signed with JL Bourg of the LNB Pro A.

== Career statistics ==
Legend
GP	Games played	GS	Games started	MPG	Minutes per game
FG%	Field goal percentage	3P%	3-point field goal percentage	FT%	Free throw percentage
RPG	Rebounds per game	APG	Assists per game	SPG	Steals per game
BPG	Blocks per game	PPG	Points per game	**Bold**	Career high

=== College ===
Year	Team	GP	GS	MPG	FG%	3P%	FT%	RPG	APG	SPG	BPG	PPG
2019–20	UMass	31	31	30.8	.481	.330	.728	**7.2**	1.9	1.0	1.0	17.7
2020–21	UMass	13	12	**32.2**	**.519**	**.375**	.768	**7.2**	2.2	**1.2**	**1.5**	**18.8**
2021–22	Texas	24	17	18.6	.478	.326	**.800**	4.0	1.3	.7	.7	8.7
2022–23	West Virginia	**34**	**32**	30.0	.470	.364	.789	5.5	1.8	.8	.6	11.7
2023-24	Kentucky	27	24	30.2	.484	.305	.744	**7.2**	**2.6**	1.0	.7	10.7
Career		129	116	28.3	.483	.338	.760	6.1	1.9	.9	.9	13.1
