= 2017–18 West Virginia Mountaineers men's basketball team =

American college basketball season

2017–18 West Virginia Mountaineers men's basketball

AdvoCare Invitational champions

NCAA tournament, Sweet Sixteen
- Conference: Big 12 Conference

Ranking
- Coaches: No. 13
- AP: No. 15
- Record: 26–11 (11–7 Big 12)
- Head coach: Bob Huggins (11th season)
- Assistant coaches: Larry Harrison; Ron Everhart; Erik Martin
- Home arena: WVU Coliseum

2017–18 Big 12 men's basketball standings
	Conf.				Overall
Team	W		L	PCT	W		L	PCT
No. 4 Kansas †	13	–	5	.722	31	–	8	.795
No. 14 Texas Tech	11	–	7	.611	27	–	10	.730
No. 15 West Virginia	11	–	7	.611	26	–	11	.703
Kansas State	10	–	8	.556	25	–	12	.676
TCU	9	–	9	.500	21	–	12	.636
Baylor	8	–	10	.444	19	–	15	.559
Texas	8	–	10	.444	19	–	15	.559
Oklahoma State	8	–	10	.444	21	–	15	.583
Oklahoma	8	–	10	.444	18	–	14	.563
Iowa State	4	–	14	.222	13	–	18	.419
† 2018 Big 12 Tournament winner Rankings from AP poll

The 2017–18 West Virginia Mountaineers men's basketball team represented West Virginia University during the 2017–18 NCAA Division I men's basketball season. The Mountaineers were coached by Bob Huggins, in his 11th season as WVU's head coach, and played their home games at the WVU Coliseum in Morgantown, West Virginia as members of the Big 12 Conference. They finished the season 26–11, 11–7 in Big 12 play to finish in a tie for second place. They defeated Baylor and Texas Tech to advance to the championship game of the Big 12 tournament where they lost to Kansas. They received an at-large bid to the NCAA tournament where they defeated Murray State and Marshall to advance to the Sweet Sixteen, where they lost to Villanova.

== Previous season ==
The Mountaineers finished the 2016–17 season 28–9, 12–6 in Big 12 play to finish in second place in conference. They defeated Texas and Kansas State to advance to the championship game of the Big 12 tournament where they lost to Iowa State. They received an at-large bid to the NCAA tournament where they defeated Bucknell and Notre Dame before losing in the Sweet Sixteen to Gonzaga.

== Departures ==
Name	Number	Pos.	Height	Weight	Year	Hometown	Notes
Teyvon Myers	0	G	6'2"	185	Senior	Brooklyn, NY	Graduated
Nathan Adrian	11	F	6'9"	235	Senior	Morgantown, WV	Graduated
Tarik Phillip	12	G	6'3"	195	Senior	Brooklyn, NY	Graduated
James Long	13	G	5'11"	185	Senior	Charleston, WV	Graduated
Brandon Watkins	20	F	6'9"	230	Senior	Decatur, GA	Graduated
Elijah Macon	25	F	6'9"	240	Sophomore (redshirt)	Columbus, OH	Declared for 2017 NBA draft (undrafted)

== Future recruits ==
=== 2018–19 team recruits ===
College recruiting information
Name	Hometown	School	Height	Weight	Commit date
Derek Culver; PF	Warren, OH	Brewster Academy	6 ft 8 in (2.03 m)	205 lb (93 kg)	Aug 2, 2016
Derek Culver; PF	Recruit ratings: Scout: Rivals: 247Sports: ESPN:				
Jordan McCabe; PG	Kaukauna, WI	Kaukauna High School	5 ft 10 in (1.78 m)	155 lb (70 kg)	Aug 16, 2016
Jordan McCabe; PG	Recruit ratings: Scout: Rivals: 247Sports: ESPN:				
Trey Doomes; SG	Acworth, GA	University School	6 ft 3 in (1.91 m)	185 lb (84 kg)	Oct 5, 2017
Trey Doomes; SG	Recruit ratings: Scout: Rivals: 247Sports: ESPN:				
Andrew Gordon; PF	Dunedin, FL	Northwest Florida State College	6 ft 10 in (2.08 m)	220 lb (100 kg)	Oct 6, 2017
Andrew Gordon; PF	Recruit ratings: Scout: Rivals: 247Sports: ESPN:				
Overall recruit ranking:
Note: In many cases, Scout, Rivals, 247Sports, On3, and ESPN may conflict in their listings of height and weight.; In these cases, the average was taken. ESPN grades are on a 100-point scale.; Sources: "2018 Team Ranking". Rivals.

== Roster ==
2017–18 West Virginia Mountaineers men's basketball team
Players
Coaches

Pos.	#	Name	Height	Weight	Year	Previous school	Hometown
G	2	Jevon Carter	6 ft 2 in (1.88 m)	205 lb (93 kg)	Sr	Proviso East HS	Maywood, IL
G	3	James Bolden	6 ft 0 in (1.83 m)	170 lb (77 kg)	RS So	Holmes HS	Covington, KY
G	4	Daxter Miles Jr.	6 ft 3 in (1.91 m)	200 lb (91 kg)	Sr	Notre Dame Prep	Baltimore, MD
G	5	Brandon Knapper (injured) (redshirt)	6 ft 0 in (1.83 m)	180 lb (82 kg)	Fr	Hargrave Military Academy	South Charleston, WV
F	11	D'Angelo Hunter	6 ft 6 in (1.98 m)	190 lb (86 kg)	Jr	Navarro College	Louisville, KY
F	13	Teddy Allen	6 ft 5 in (1.96 m)	225 lb (102 kg)	Fr	Boys Town HS (NE)	Mesa, AZ
G	14	Chase Harler	6 ft 3 in (1.91 m)	180 lb (82 kg)	So	Wheeling Central HS	Moundsville, WV
F	15	Lamont West	6 ft 8 in (2.03 m)	220 lb (100 kg)	RS So	Miller Grove HS	Cincinnati, OH
F	21	Wesley Harris	6 ft 8 in (2.03 m)	200 lb (91 kg)	So	Lawson State CC	Jackson, MS
F	23	Esa Ahmad	6 ft 8 in (2.03 m)	230 lb (104 kg)	Jr	Shaker Heights HS	Cleveland, OH
F	25	Maciej Bender	6 ft 10 in (2.08 m)	250 lb (113 kg)	So	Mountain Mission School	Warsaw, Poland
F	31	Logan Routt	6 ft 11 in (2.11 m)	260 lb (118 kg)	RS So	Cameron HS	Cameron, WV
F	50	Sagaba Konate	6 ft 8 in (2.03 m)	260 lb (118 kg)	So	Kennedy Catholic HS	Bamako, Mali

Head coach

- Bob Huggins (West Virginia)

Assistant coach(es)

- Larry Harrison (Pittsburgh)
- Ron Everhart (Virginia Tech)
- Erik Martin (Cincinnati)

Legend

- (C) Team captain
- (S) Suspended
- (I) Ineligible
- (W) Walk-on
- Injured
- Current redshirt

Roster
Last update: January 11, 2018

== Schedule and results ==
Date time, TV	Rank^{#}	Opponent^{#}	Result	Record	High points	High rebounds	High assists	Site (attendance) city, state
Exhibition
Oct 28, 2017*; 7:30 pm		Albany; Charity exhibition	W 98–67	–	26 – West	8 – Harris	6 – Carter	WVU Coliseum (5,174); Morgantown, WV
Dec 16, 2017*; 2:00 pm, AT&T	No. 11	Wheeling Jesuit	W 98–50	–	–	–	–	WVU Coliseum (8,502); Morgantown, WV
Regular season
Nov 10, 2017*; 6:00 pm, ESPN	No. 11	vs. No. 25 Texas A&M; Armed Forces Classic	L 65–88	0–1	19 – Bolden	6 – Bender/Konate	7 – Carter	Ramstein Air Base (3,128); Ramstein Air Base, Germany
Nov 15, 2017*; 7:00 pm, AT&T	No. 24	American	W 98–64	1–1	20 – Carter/Miles Jr.	8 – Harris	7 – Carter	WVU Coliseum (9,180); Morgantown, WV
Nov 18, 2017*; 7:30 pm, Nexstar	No. 24	Morgan State	W 111–48	2–1	32 – Miles Jr.	7 – Harris	7 – Harler	WVU Coliseum (11,698); Morgantown, WV
Nov 20, 2017*; 7:00 pm, AT&T	No. 23-T	Long Beach State; AdvoCare Invitational campus game	W 91–62	3–1	22 – West	8 – West	7 – Carter	WVU Coliseum (8,676); Morgantown, WV
Nov 23, 2017*; 8:30 pm, ESPNews	No. 23-T	vs. Marist; AdvoCare Invitational Quarterfinals	W 84–78	4–1	20 – Carter	10 – Konate	7 – Miles Jr.	HP Field House (3,348); Lake Buena Vista, FL
Nov 24, 2017*; 5:00 pm, ESPN2	No. 23-T	vs. UCF; AdvoCare Invitational semifinals	W 83–45	5–1	17 – Bolden	9 – Konate	5 – Carter	HP Field House (2,834); Lake Buena Vista, FL
Nov 26, 2017*; 9:30 pm, ESPN2	No. 23-T	vs. Missouri; AdvoCare Invitational championship game	W 83–79	6–1	29 – Carter	10 – Wesley	3 – Carter	HP Field House (2,591); Lake Buena Vista, FL
Nov 30, 2017*; 7:00 pm, AT&T	No. 19	NJIT	W 102–69	7–1	25 – Carter	9 – Carter	6 – Carter	WVU Coliseum (8,882); Morgantown, WV
Dec 5, 2017*; 7:00 pm, ESPNU	No. 18	No. 15 Virginia	W 68–61	8–1	23 – Carter	10 – Carter	7 – Carter	WVU Coliseum (12,816); Morgantown, WV
Dec 9, 2017*; 8:00 pm, ESPN2	No. 18	at Pittsburgh; Backyard Brawl	W 69–60	9–1	19 – Carter	8 – West	9 – Carter	Petersen Events Center (7,748); Pittsburgh, PA
Dec 20, 2017*; 7:00 pm, AT&T	No. 10	Coppin State	W 77–38	10–1	24 – Allen	9 – Allen	4 – Carter	WVU Coliseum (8,102); Morgantown, WV
Dec 23, 2017*; 12:00 pm, AT&T	No. 10	Fordham	W 86–69	11–1	21 – Miles Jr.	12 – Carter	11 – Konate	WVU Coliseum (11,296); Morgantown, WV
Dec 29, 2017; 7:00 pm, ESPNU	No. 7	at Oklahoma State	W 85–79	12–1 (1–0)	15 – Allen	9 – Konate	7 – Carter	Gallagher-Iba Arena (8,257); Stillwater, OK
Jan 1, 2018; 5:00 pm, ESPNU	No. 6	at Kansas State	W 77–69	13–1 (2–0)	22 – Allen	8 – Carter	10 – Carter	Bramlage Coliseum (9,712); Manhattan, KS
Jan 6, 2018; 7:15 pm, ESPN2	No. 6	No. 7 Oklahoma	W 89–76	14–1 (3–0)	20 – Allen	13 – Konate	10 – Carter	WVU Coliseum (15,106); Morgantown, WV
Jan 9, 2018; 7:00 pm, ESPN2	No. 2	Baylor	W 57–54	15–1 (4–0)	12 – Miles Jr./West	12 – Konate	5 – Carter	WVU Coliseum (12,551); Morgantown, WV
Jan 13, 2018; 2:00 pm, ESPN	No. 2	at No. 8 Texas Tech	L 71–72	15–2 (4–1)	28 – Carter	11 – Konate	5 – Miles Jr.	United Supermarkets Arena (15,098); Lubbock, TX
Jan 15, 2018; 9:00 pm, ESPN	No. 6	No. 10 Kansas	L 66–71	15–3 (4–2)	16 – Konate	10 – Konate	4 – Carter/Miles Jr.	WVU Coliseum (14,115); Morgantown, WV
Jan 20, 2018; 2:00 pm, CBS	No. 6	Texas	W 86–51	16–3 (5–2)	22 – Carter	14 – Konate	8 – Carter	WVU Coliseum (14,001); Morgantown, WV
Jan 22, 2018; 9:00 pm, ESPN	No. 7	at TCU	L 73–82	16–4 (5–3)	16 – Carter	8 – Konate	7 – Carter	Schollmaier Arena (7,368); Fort Worth, TX
Jan 27, 2018*; 7:00 pm, ESPN	No. 7	Kentucky; Big 12/SEC Challenge/College Gameday	L 76–83	16–5	26 – Carter	6 – Konate	7 – Carter	WVU Coliseum (15,835); Morgantown, WV
Jan 31, 2018; 7:00 pm, ESPNU	No. 15	at Iowa State	L 77–93	16–6 (5–4)	18 – Carter	8 – Ahmad	9 – Carter	Hilton Coliseum (14,219); Ames, IA
Feb 3, 2018; 4:00 pm, ESPN2	No. 15	Kansas State	W 89–51	17–6 (6–4)	19 – Konate	9 – Konate	11 – Carter	WVU Coliseum (13,329); Morgantown, WV
Feb 5, 2018; 9:00 pm, ESPN	No. 19	at No. 17 Oklahoma	W 75–73	18–6 (7–4)	17 – West	11 – Konate	8 – Carter	Lloyd Noble Center (10,650); Norman, OK
Feb 10, 2018; 12:00 pm, ESPN	No. 19	Oklahoma State	L 85–88	18–7 (7–5)	33 – Carter	7 – Konate	5 – Miles Jr.	WVU Coliseum (13,057); Morgantown, WV
Feb 12, 2018; 9:00 pm, ESPN2	No. 20	TCU	W 82–66	19–7 (8–5)	16 – Allen	6 – Allen/Bender	9 – Carter	WVU Coliseum (11,773); Morgantown, WV
Feb 17, 2018; 6:00 pm, ESPN	No. 20	at No. 13 Kansas; ESPN College GameDay	L 69–77	19–8 (8–6)	22 – Miles Jr.	6 – 3 tied	7 – Carter	Allen Fieldhouse (16,300); Lawrence, KS
Feb 20, 2018; 7:00 pm, ESPN2	No. 21	at Baylor	W 71–60	20–8 (9–6)	15 – Ahmad/Carter	10 – Konate	4 – Miles Jr.	Ferrell Center (7,519); Waco, TX
Feb 24, 2018; 6:00 pm, ESPNU	No. 21	Iowa State	W 85–70	21–8 (10–6)	24 – Carter	11 – Ahmad	3 – Ahmad	WVU Coliseum (14,205); Morgantown, WV
Feb 26, 2018; 9:00 pm, ESPN2	No. 20	No. 12 Texas Tech	W 84–74	22–8 (11–6)	21 – Carter	11 – Ahmad	7 – Carter	WVU Coliseum (14,542); Morgantown, WV
Mar 3, 2018; 12:00 pm, ESPN	No. 20	at Texas	L 79–87 ^{OT}	22–9 (11–7)	15 – West	8 – Konate	6 – Carter	Frank Erwin Center (11,364); Austin, TX
Big 12 Tournament
Mar 8, 2018; 9:00 pm, ESPNU	(3) No. 18	vs. (6) Baylor; Quarterfinals	W 78–65	23–9	21 – Ahmad	8 – Ahmad	11 – Carter	Sprint Center (17,653); Kansas City, MO
Mar 9, 2018; 9:00 pm, ESPN2	(3) No. 18	vs. (2) No. 14 Texas Tech; Semifinals	W 66–63	24–9	16 – Miles Jr.	7 – Harris	4 – Carter	Sprint Center (18,223); Kansas City, MO
Mar 10, 2018; 6:00 pm, ESPN	(3) No. 18	vs. (1) No. 9 Kansas; Championship	L 70–81	24–10	25 – Miles Jr.	6 – Ahmad	9 – Carter	Sprint Center (17,718); Kansas City, MO
NCAA tournament
Mar 16, 2018*; 4:00 pm, TNT	(5 E) No. 15	vs. (12 E) Murray State; First Round	W 85–68	25–10	21 – Carter	7 – Konate	8 – Carter	Viejas Arena (10,892); San Diego, CA
Mar 18, 2018*; 9:40 pm, TBS	(5 E) No. 15	vs. (13 E) Marshall; Second Round	W 94–71	26–10	28 – Carter	10 – West	7 – Ahmad	Viejas Arena (11,628); San Diego, CA
Mar 23, 2018*; 7:27 pm, TBS	(5 E) No. 15	vs. (1 E) No. 2 Villanova; Sweet Sixteen	L 78–90	26–11	16 – Miles Jr.	9 – Konate	8 – Carter	TD Garden (19,055); Boston, MA
*Non-conference game. ^{#}Rankings from AP Poll. (#) Tournament seedings in parentheses. E=East. All times are in Eastern Time.

== Rankings ==
Ranking movements Legend: ██ Increase in ranking ██ Decrease in ranking т = Tied with team above or below ( ) = First-place votes
	Week																			
Poll	Pre	1	2	3	4	5	6	7	8	9	10	11	12	13	14	15	16	17	18	Final
AP	11	24	23-T	19	18	11	10	7	6	2 (12)	6	7	15	19	20	21	20	18	15	Not released
Coaches	10	10	20	19	16	11	11	7	5	2 (4)	7	7	11	17	20	21	19	18	14	13

== See also ==
- 2017–18 West Virginia Mountaineers women's basketball team
