= 2017–18 Texas Tech Red Raiders basketball team =

American college basketball season

2017–18 Texas Tech Red Raiders basketball

Hall of Fame Tip Off champions

NCAA tournament, Elite Eight
- Conference: Big 12 Conference

Ranking
- Coaches: No. 6
- AP: No. 14
- Record: 27–10 (11–7 Big 12)
- Head coach: Chris Beard (2nd season)
- Assistant coaches: Chris Ogden; Al Pinkens; Mark Adams
- Home arena: United Supermarkets Arena

2017–18 Big 12 men's basketball standings
	Conf.				Overall
Team	W		L	PCT	W		L	PCT
No. 4 Kansas †	13	–	5	.722	31	–	8	.795
No. 14 Texas Tech	11	–	7	.611	27	–	10	.730
No. 15 West Virginia	11	–	7	.611	26	–	11	.703
Kansas State	10	–	8	.556	25	–	12	.676
TCU	9	–	9	.500	21	–	12	.636
Baylor	8	–	10	.444	19	–	15	.559
Texas	8	–	10	.444	19	–	15	.559
Oklahoma State	8	–	10	.444	21	–	15	.583
Oklahoma	8	–	10	.444	18	–	14	.563
Iowa State	4	–	14	.222	13	–	18	.419
† 2018 Big 12 Tournament winner Rankings from AP poll

The 2017–18 Texas Tech Red Raiders basketball team represented Texas Tech University in the 2017–18 NCAA Division I men's basketball season as a member of the Big 12 Conference. The Red Raiders were led by second-year coach Chris Beard. They played their home games at the United Supermarkets Arena in Lubbock, Texas. They finished the season 27–10, 11–7 in Big 12 play to finish in a tie for second place. They defeated Baylor in the quarterfinals of the Big 12 tournament before losing in the semifinals to West Virginia. They received an at-large bid to the NCAA tournament where they defeated Stephen F. Austin, Florida, and Purdue to advance to the Elite Eight for the first time in school history. In the Elite Eight, they were eliminated by Villanova.

== Previous season ==
The Red Raiders finished the 2016–17 season 18–14, 6–12 in Big 12 play to finish in a tie for seventh place. They lost in the first round of the Big 12 tournament to Texas.

== Offseason ==
=== Departures ===
Name	Number	Pos.	Height	Weight	Year	Hometown	Reason for departure
Devon Thomas	2	G	6'0"	175	Senior	Silver Spring, MD	Graduated
Shandell Millighaus	4	G	6'2"	195	Junior	Brooklyn, NY	Graduate transferred to Georgetown (KY)
Aaron Ross	15	F	6'8"	215	RS Senior	North Little Rock, AR	Graduated
Anthony Livingston	21	F	6'8"	220	Senior	Washington, DC	Graduated
Thomas Brandsma	22	F	6'5"	220	Senior	Colleyville, TX	Graduated
Giovanni McLean	23	G	6'0"	190	Senior	Bronx, NY	Graduated
Matthew Temple	34	F	6'10"	240	Senior	Wichita Falls, TX	Graduated
John Brown	44	F	6'10"	240	Freshman	Magnolia, TX	Walk-on; didn't return

=== Incoming transfers ===
Name	Number	Pos.	Height	Weight	Year	Hometown	Previous college
Josh Webster	3	G	6'4"		Junior	St. Louis, MO	Junior college transferred from South Plains College
Hyron Edwards	4	G	6'1"	165	Junior	East Chicago, IN	Junior college transferred from Trinity Valley Community College

== Recruits ==
=== Recruiting Class of 2017 ===
College recruiting
Name	Hometown	School	Height	Weight	Commit date
Jarrett Culver #43 SG	Lubbock, TX	Coronado High School	6 ft 5 in (1.96 m)	185 lb (84 kg)	Sep 22, 2016
Jarrett Culver #43 SG	Recruit ratings: Scout: Rivals: 247Sports: ESPN:				
Daniel Mading #48 PF	Perth, Australia	St. Anthony High School	6 ft 9 in (2.06 m)	180 lb (82 kg)	Feb 14, 2017
Daniel Mading #48 PF	Recruit ratings: Scout: Rivals: 247Sports: ESPN:				
Davide Moretti; PG	Bologna, Italy	Universo Treviso Basket	6 ft 3 in (1.91 m)	185 lb (84 kg)	
Davide Moretti; PG	Recruit ratings: Scout: Rivals: 247Sports: ESPN:				
Zhaire Smith; SG	Garland, TX	Lakeview Centennial High School	6 ft 5 in (1.96 m)	175 lb (79 kg)	Apr 13, 2017
Zhaire Smith; SG	Recruit ratings: Scout: Rivals: 247Sports: ESPN:				
Malik Ondigo; PF	El Mirage, AZ	Putnam Science Academy	6 ft 10 in (2.08 m)	210 lb (95 kg)	Apr 24, 2017
Malik Ondigo; PF	Recruit ratings: Scout: Rivals: 247Sports: ESPN:				
Overall recruit ranking:
Note: In many cases, Scout, Rivals, 247Sports, On3, and ESPN may conflict in their listings of height and weight.; In these cases, the average was taken. ESPN grades are on a 100-point scale.; Sources: "2017 Team Ranking". Rivals.

=== Recruiting class of 2018 ===
College recruiting (2018)
Name	Hometown	School	Height	Weight	Commit date
Kyler Edwards; SG	Arlington, TX	Findley Prep	6 ft 4 in (1.93 m)	195 lb (88 kg)	Sep 17, 2017
Kyler Edwards; SG	Recruit ratings: Scout: Rivals: 247Sports: ESPN:				
Deshawn Corprew; SG	Norfolk, VA	South Plains College	6 ft 6 in (1.98 m)	190 lb (86 kg)	Sep 26, 2017
Deshawn Corprew; SG	Recruit ratings: Scout: Rivals: 247Sports: ESPN:				
Khavon Moore; SF	Macon, GA	Westside High School	6 ft 8 in (2.03 m)	187 lb (85 kg)	Feb 26, 2018
Khavon Moore; SF	Recruit ratings: Scout: Rivals: 247Sports: ESPN:				
Overall recruit ranking:
Note: In many cases, Scout, Rivals, 247Sports, On3, and ESPN may conflict in their listings of height and weight.; In these cases, the average was taken. ESPN grades are on a 100-point scale.; Sources: "2018 Team Ranking". Rivals.

== Roster ==
2017–18 Texas Tech Red Raiders men's basketball team
Players
Coaches

Pos.	#	Name	Height	Weight	Year	Previous school	Hometown
C	0	Tommy Hamilton IV	6 ft 11 in (2.11 m)	250 lb (113 kg)	RS Sr	IMG Academy; DePaul	Chicago, IL
G	1	Brandone Francis	6 ft 5 in (1.96 m)	205 lb (93 kg)	RS Jr	Arlington Country Day; Florida	La Romana, DR
G	2	Zhaire Smith	6 ft 5 in (1.96 m)	195 lb (88 kg)	Fr	Lakeview Centennial	Garland, TX
G	3	Josh Webster	6 ft 4 in (1.93 m)	175 lb (79 kg)	Jr	Christian Brothers College; South Plains College	St. Louis, MO
G	4	Hyron Edwards	6 ft 0 in (1.83 m)	170 lb (77 kg)	Jr	East Chicago Central; Trinity Valley CC	East Chicago, IN
F	5	Justin Gray	6 ft 6 in (1.98 m)	210 lb (95 kg)	Sr	Berkeley Prep	Tampa, FL
G	10	Niem Stevenson	6 ft 5 in (1.96 m)	205 lb (93 kg)	Sr	Ranchview	Irving, TX
F	11	Zach Smith	6 ft 8 in (2.03 m)	220 lb (100 kg)	Sr	Plano East	Plano, TX
G	12	Keenan Evans	6 ft 3 in (1.91 m)	190 lb (86 kg)	Sr	Berkner	Richardson, TX
G	13	Alex Vilarino	6 ft 1 in (1.85 m)	180 lb (82 kg)	Fr	McKinney	McKinney, TX
F	21	Malik Ondigo	6 ft 10 in (2.08 m)	210 lb (95 kg)	Fr	Dysart/Putnam Science Academy	El Mirage, AZ
G	23	Jarrett Culver	6 ft 5 in (1.96 m)	190 lb (86 kg)	Fr	Coronado	Lubbock, TX
G	24	Avery Benson	6 ft 3 in (1.91 m)	185 lb (84 kg)	Fr	Southwest Christian Academy	Springdale, AR
G	25	Davide Moretti	6 ft 3 in (1.91 m)	165 lb (75 kg)	Fr	Treviso Basket	Bologna, Italy
G	30	Andrew Sorrells (W)	6 ft 3 in (1.91 m)	170 lb (77 kg)	RS So	Birdville	North Richland Hills, TX
C	32	Norense Odiase	6 ft 9 in (2.06 m)	245 lb (111 kg)	RS Jr	North Crowley	Crowley, TX
G	35	Parker Hicks (W)	6 ft 5 in (1.96 m)	200 lb (91 kg)	Fr	Decatur	Decatur, TX

Head coach

- Chris Beard (Texas)

Assistant coach(es)

- Mark Adams (Texas Tech)
- Chris Ogden (Texas)
- Al Pinkens (NC State)

Legend

- (C) Team captain
- (S) Suspended
- (I) Ineligible
- (W) Walk-on
- Injured
- Current redshirt

Roster

== Schedule and results ==
Date time, TV	Rank^{#}	Opponent^{#}	Result	Record	High points	High rebounds	High assists	Site (attendance) city, state
Exhibition
Nov 1, 2017*; 7:00 pm		Angelo State	W 88–69		21 – Evans	8 – Zach Smith	6 – Zach Smith	United Supermarkets Arena; Lubbock, TX
Nov 5, 2017*; 1:00 pm		vs. New Mexico State; Hurricane Relief exhibition game	W 84–54		13 – Zhaire Smith	–	4 – Stevenson	Chaparral Center; Midland, TX
Regular season
Nov 10, 2017*; 8:00 pm, FCS		South Alabama; Hall of Fame Tip Off campus-site game	W 75–50	1–0	14 – Zhaire Smith	6 – Francis	3 – Tied	United Supermarkets Arena (8,865); Lubbock, TX
Nov 14, 2017*; 7:00 pm, FCS		Maine; Hall of Fame Tip Off campus-site game	W 83–44	2–0	12 – Evans	8 – Stevenson	4 – Tied	United Supermarkets Arena (6,317); Lubbock, TX
Nov 18, 2017*; 11:00 am, ESPN3		vs. Boston College; Hall of Fame Tip Off semifinals	W 75–64	3–0	29 – Evans	9 – Zach Smith	3 – Zach Smith	Mohegan Sun Arena; Uncasville, CT
Nov 19, 2017*; 4:30 pm, ESPN2		vs. No. 20 Northwestern; Hall of Fame Tip Off championship	W 85–49	4–0	25 – Evans	5 – Tied	3 – Tied	Mohegan Sun Arena; Uncasville, CT
Nov 22, 2017*; 5:30 pm, FSSW+		Wofford	W 79–56	5–0	21 – Culver	7 – Odiase	6 – Moretti	United Supermarkets Arena (7,526); Lubbock, TX
Nov 25, 2017*; 2:00 pm, FSSW+		Savannah State	W 103–69	6–0	18 – Tied	7 – Odiase	7 – Tied	United Supermarkets Arena (6,614); Lubbock, TX
Nov 30, 2017*; 5:30 pm, FS1	No. 22	vs. Seton Hall; Under Armour Reunion	L 79–89	6–1	21 – Evans	12 – Odiase	6 – Evans	Madison Square Garden (6,081); New York, NY
Dec 5, 2017*; 7:00 pm, FCS		No. 22 Nevada	W 82–76 ^{OT}	7–1	32 – Evans	8 – Evans	3 – Tied	United Supermarkets Arena (9,872); Lubbock, TX
Dec 13, 2017*; 8:00 pm, FSSW+	No. 24	Kennesaw State	W 82–53	8–1	16 – Evans	8 – Odiase	4 – Stevenson	United Supermarkets Arena (7,026); Lubbock, TX
Dec 16, 2017*; 7:00 pm	No. 24	Rice; Throwback Game	W 73–53	9–1	13 – Evans	5 – Tied	5 – Evans	Lubbock Municipal Coliseum (7,034); Lubbock, TX
Dec 19, 2017*; 7:00 pm, FSSW+	No. 21	Florida Atlantic	W 90–54	10–1	15 – Evans	7 – Hamilton	6 – Evans	United Supermarkets Arena (7,731); Lubbock, TX
Dec 22, 2017*; 2:00 pm, FSSW+	No. 21	Abilene Christian	W 74–47	11–1	16 – Zach Smith	8 – Hamilton	3 – Tied	United Supermarkets Arena (7,907); Lubbock, TX
Dec 29, 2017; 7:00 pm, FCS	No. 22	No. 18 Baylor	W 77–53	12–1 (1–0)	18 – Evans	7 – Hamilton	5 – Stevenson	United Supermarkets Arena (12,827); Lubbock, TX
Jan 2, 2018; 8:00 pm, ESPN	No. 18	at No. 10 Kansas	W 85–73	13–1 (2–0)	15 – Evans	8 – Odiase	4 – Stevenson	Allen Fieldhouse (16,300); Lawrence, KS
Jan 6, 2018; 3:00 pm, FSSW+	No. 18	Kansas State	W 74–58	14–1 (3–0)	27 – Evans	6 – Zhaire Smith	4 – Evans	United Supermarkets Arena (12,531); Lubbock, TX
Jan 9, 2018; 6:00 pm, ESPNU	No. 8	at No. 9 Oklahoma	L 65–75	14–2 (3–1)	19 – Evans	9 – Tied	2 – Tied	Lloyd Noble Center (10,043); Norman, OK
Jan 13, 2018; 1:00 pm, ESPN	No. 8	No. 2 West Virginia	W 72–71	15–2 (4–1)	20 – Evans	8 – Zhaire Smith	2 – Tied	United Supermarkets Arena (15,098); Lubbock, TX
Jan 17, 2018; 7:00 pm, LHN	No. 8	at Texas	L 58–67	15–3 (4–2)	16 – Culver	9 – Culver	2 – Tied	Frank Erwin Center (12,396); Austin, TX
Jan 20, 2018; 1:00 pm, ESPNU	No. 8	at Iowa State	L 52–70	15–4 (4–3)	10 – Zhaire Smith	6 – Culver	4 – Evans	Hilton Coliseum (14,384); Ames, IA
Jan 23, 2018; 6:00 pm, ESPNews	No. 14	Oklahoma State	W 75–70	16–4 (5–3)	26 – Evans	8 – Culver	5 – Evans	United Supermarkets Arena (12,585); Lubbock, TX
Jan 27, 2018*; 11:00 am, ESPN2	No. 14	at South Carolina; Big 12/SEC Challenge	W 70–63	17–4	31 – Evans	7 – Zhaire Smith	3 – Tied	Colonial Life Arena (14,142); Columbia, SC
Jan 31, 2018; 8:00 pm, ESPNU	No. 10	Texas	W 73–71 ^{OT}	18–4 (6–3)	38 – Evans	11 – Odiase	3 – Evans	United Supermarkets Arena (15,098); Lubbock, TX
Feb 3, 2018; 1:00 pm, ESPNU	No. 10	at TCU	W 83–71	19–4 (7–3)	20 – Culver	5 – Odiase	6 – Evans	Schollmaier Arena (7,178); Fort Worth, TX
Feb 7, 2018; 8:00 pm, ESPNU	No. 7	Iowa State	W 76–58	20–4 (8–3)	21 – Zhaire Smith	8 – Zhaire Smith	4 – Evans	United Supermarkets Arena (13,221); Lubbock, TX
Feb 10, 2018; 7:00 pm, ESPNU	No. 7	at Kansas State	W 66–47	21–4 (9–3)	19 – Evans	8 – Culver	4 – Zhaire Smith	Bramlage Coliseum (9,365); Manhattan, KS
Feb 13, 2018; 6:00 pm, ESPN	No. 7	No. 23 Oklahoma	W 88–78	22–4 (10–3)	26 – Evans	7 – Stevenson	3 – Tied	United Supermarkets Arena (15,098); Lubbock, TX
Feb 17, 2018; 6:30 pm, ESPNU	No. 7	at Baylor	L 57–59	22–5 (10–4)	15 – Zhaire Smith	8 – Tied	3 – Tied	Ferrell Center (10,627); Waco, TX
Feb 21, 2018; 6:00 pm, ESPNU	No. 6-T	at Oklahoma State	L 71–79	22–6 (10–5)	18 – Zhaire Smith	6 – Culver	4 – Stevenson	Gallagher-Iba Arena (7,092); Stillwater, OK
Feb 24, 2018; 3:00 pm, ESPN	No. 6-T	No. 8 Kansas; College GameDay	L 72–74	22–7 (10–6)	20 – Zhaire Smith	6 – Evans	3 – Evans	United Supermarkets Arena (15,098); Lubbock, TX
Feb 26, 2018; 8:00 pm, ESPN2	No. 12	at No. 20 West Virginia	L 74–84	22–8 (10–7)	26 – Culver	12 – Culver	3 – Webster	WVU Coliseum (14,542); Morgantown, WV
Mar 3, 2018; 3:00 pm, ESPN2	No. 12	TCU	W 79–75	23–8 (11–7)	23 – Evans	7 – Culver	3 – Gray	United Supermarkets Arena (15,098); Lubbock, TX
Big 12 Tournament
Mar 8, 2018; 6:00 pm, ESPNU	(2) No. 14	vs. (7) Texas; Quarterfinals	W 73–69	24–8	25 – Evans	11 – Culver	3 – Evans	Sprint Center (17,653); Kansas City, MO
Mar 9, 2018; 8:00 pm, ESPN2	(2) No. 14	vs. (3) No. 18 West Virginia; Semifinals	L 63–66	24–9	16 – Culver	7 – Gray	7 – Hamilton	Sprint Center (18,223); Kansas City, MO
NCAA tournament
Mar 15, 2018*; 6:27 pm, truTV	(3 E) No. 14	vs. (14 E) Stephen F. Austin; First Round	W 70–60	25–9	23 – Evans	8 – Smith	5 – Evans	American Airlines Center (18,703); Dallas, TX
Mar 17, 2018*; 8:40 pm, TNT	(3 E) No. 14	vs. (6 E) No. 23 Florida; Second Round	W 69–66	26–9	22 – Evans	9 – Tied	7 – Smith	American Airlines Center (18,642); Dallas, TX
Mar 23, 2018*; 9:07 pm, TBS	(3 E) No. 14	vs. (2 E) No. 11 Purdue; Sweet Sixteen	W 78–65	27–9	16 – Evans	7 – Gray	4 – Tied	TD Garden (19,059); Boston, MA
Mar 25, 2018*; 1:20 pm, CBS	(3 E) No. 14	vs. (1 E) No. 2 Villanova; Elite Eight	L 59–71	27–10	12 – Evans	9 – Gray	4 – Evans	TD Garden (19,169); Boston, MA
*Non-conference game. ^{#}Rankings from AP Poll. (#) Tournament seedings in parentheses. E=East. All times are in Central Time.

== Rankings ==
Ranking movements Legend: ██ Increase in ranking ██ Decrease in ranking — = Not ranked RV = Received votes т = Tied with team above or below
	Week																			
Poll	Pre	1	2	3	4	5	6	7	8	9	10	11	12	13	14	15	16	17	18	Final
AP	—	—	RV	22	RV	24	21	22	18	8	8	14	10	7	7	6–T	12	14	14	Not released
Coaches	—	—	—	22	RV	RV	21	21	18	8	8	14	10	7	6	7	12	13	13	6

*AP does not release post-NCAA tournament rankings.
