= Courtney Ramey =

American basketball player

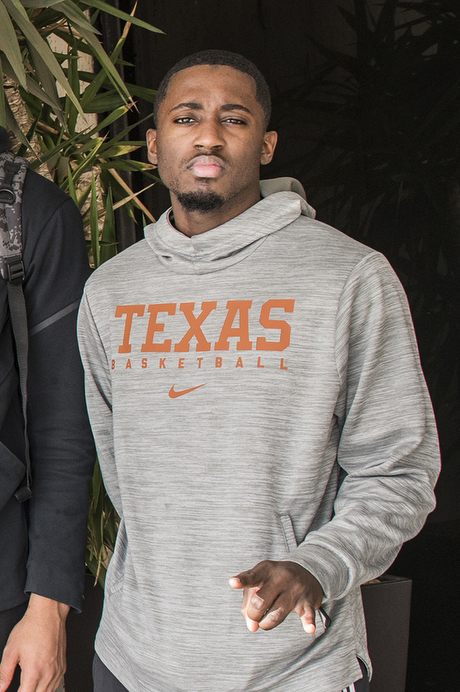
- Ramey in 2018

No. 3 – Start Lublin
- Position: Point guard
- League: PLK

Personal information
- Born: October 2, 1999 (age 27) St. Louis, Missouri, U.S.
- Listed height: 6 ft 3 in (1.91 m)
- Listed weight: 185 lb (84 kg)

Career information
- High school: Webster Groves (Webster Groves, Missouri)
- College: Texas (2018–2022); Arizona (2022–2023)
- NBA draft: 2023: undrafted
- Playing career: 2023–present

Career history
- 2023: Syntainics MBC
- 2023–2024: Nevėžis Kėdainiai
- 2024–2025: Start Lublin
- 2025–2026: Arka Gdynia
- 2026–present: Start Lublin

Career highlights
- NIT champion (2019); Third-team All-Big 12 (2021); Mr. Show-Me Basketball (2018)

Courtney Ramey (born October 2, 1999) is an American professional basketball player for Start Lublin of the Polish Basketball League (PLK). He played college basketball for the Texas Longhorns and the Arizona Wildcats.

== High school career ==
Ramey played basketball for Webster Groves High School in Webster Groves, Missouri. As a junior, he averaged 20 points, eight rebounds, and six assists per game, leading his team to the Class 5 state championship. He was named St. Louis Post-Dispatch Player of the Year. In his senior season, Ramey averaged 22 points, seven rebounds and seven assists per game, winning his second straight Class 5 state title and sharing St. Louis Post-Dispatch Player of the Year with E. J. Liddell. He left as his school's all-time leader in points and assists. He earned Mr. Show-Me Basketball honors as the top high school player in Missouri. Ramey originally committed to playing college basketball for Louisville but reopened his recruitment after an FBI investigation involving the program. He later committed to Texas over offers from Louisville, Missouri and Oklahoma State.

== College career ==
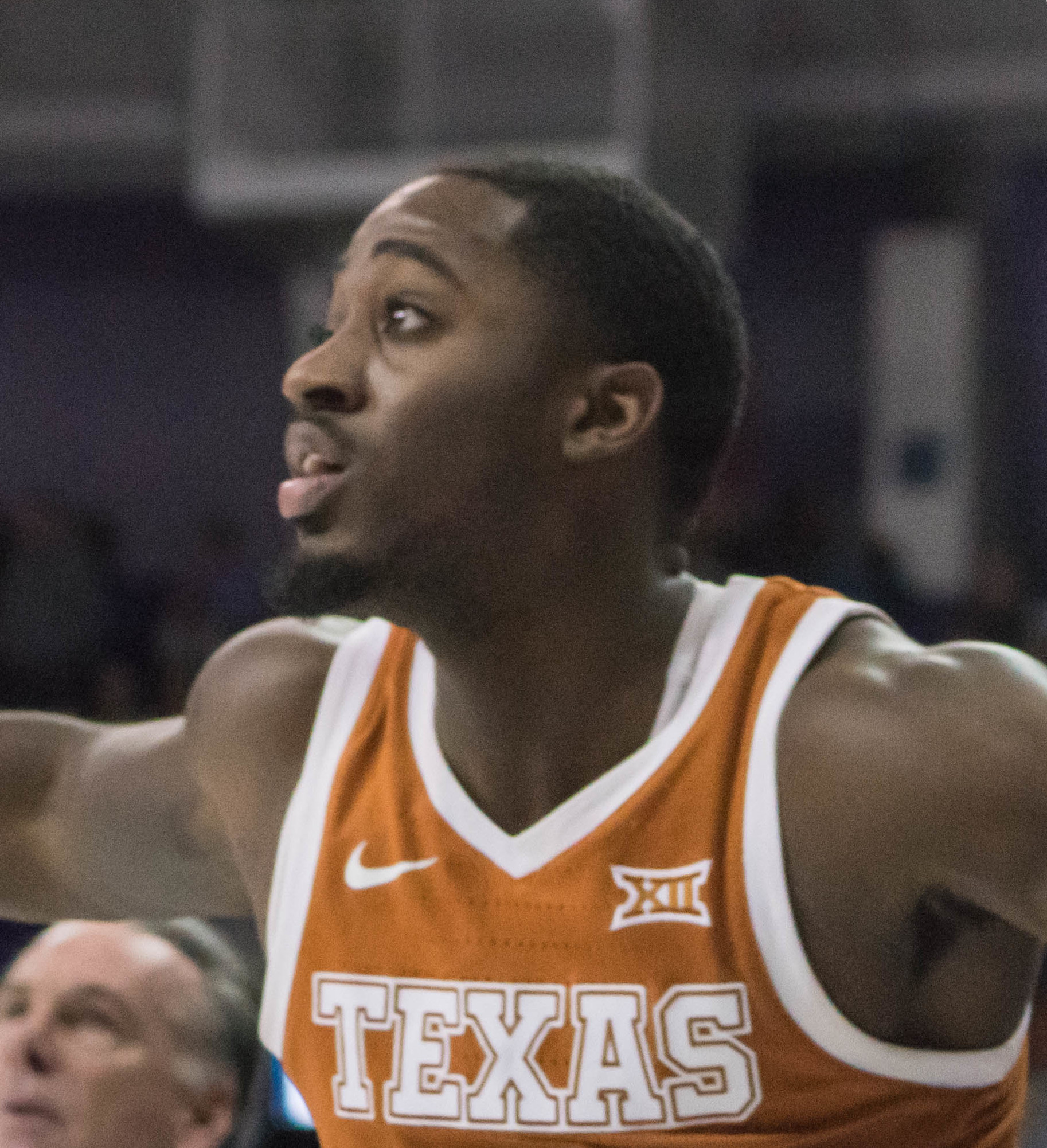
Ramey in 2020

As a freshman at Texas, Ramey was praised by head coach Shaka Smart for his impact on both ends of the floor. He averaged 8.1 points, 3.3 rebounds and 3.1 assists per game, helping his team win the 2019 National Invitation Tournament. On February 9, 2019, Ramey recorded a sophomore season-high 25 points, six rebounds and five steals in a 70–59 win over Kansas State. As a sophomore, he averaged 10.9 points, 3.9 rebounds and 2.9 assists per game and was named to the All-Big 12 honorable mention. On January 2, 2021, Ramey scored 18 points to help upset third-ranked Kansas, 84–59. As a junior, he averaged 12.2 points, 3.2 rebounds, and 3.9 assists per game, earning Third Team All-Big 12 honors. Following the season, he declared for the 2021 NBA draft while maintaining his college eligibility.

== Career statistics ==
Legend
GP	Games played	GS	Games started	MPG	Minutes per game
FG%	Field goal percentage	3P%	3-point field goal percentage	FT%	Free throw percentage
RPG	Rebounds per game	APG	Assists per game	SPG	Steals per game
BPG	Blocks per game	PPG	Points per game	**Bold**	Career high

=== College ===
Year	Team	GP	GS	MPG	FG%	3P%	FT%	RPG	APG	SPG	BPG	PPG
2018–19	Texas	**37**	20	25.5	.385	.386	.588	3.3	3.1	.9	**.2**	8.1
2019–20	Texas	31	28	31.5	**.401**	.313	.709	**3.9**	2.9	**1.0**	.1	10.9
2020–21	Texas	26	26	**33.5**	.383	**.414**	**.831**	3.2	**3.9**	**1.0**	.1	**12.2**
2021–22	Texas	34	**32**	30.1	.397	.350	.765	3.5	1.6	**1.0**	**.2**	9.4
Career		128	106	29.8	.392	.365	.737	3.5	2.8	1.0	.1	10.0

== Professional career ==
On June 30, 2023, Ramey signed his first professional contract with Syntainics MBC of the German Basketball Bundesliga. On 14 October, he parted ways with the team.

On November 6, 2023, Ramey signed with Nevėžis Kėdainiai of the Lithuanian Basketball League (LKL).

On August 2, 2024, he signed with Start Lublin of the Polish Basketball League (PLK).

On July 30, 2025, he signed with Arka Gdynia of the Polish Basketball League (PLK).

On February 26, 2026, he signed with Start Lublin of the Polish Basketball League (PLK).

== Personal life ==
Ramey wears the number 3 jersey to honor three people close to him who died during his childhood: his grandmother, his mother and his best friend, Alvin. He was coached by his father, Terrell, on his Amateur Athletic Union team.
