= MacArthur High School (Irving, Texas) =

School in Irving, Texas, United States

Coordinates: 32.853647°N 96.958806°W

- MacArthur High School Cardinals logo

Location
- 3700 MacArthur Boulevard; Irving, Dallas County, Texas 75062; United States

Information
- Type: Co-Educational, Public, Secondary
- Established: 1963
- School district: Irving Independent School District
- Teaching staff: 154.25 (FTE)
- Grades: 9–12
- Enrollment: 2,596 (2023–2024)
- Student to teacher ratio: 16.83
- Colors: Red; White; Black
- Mascot: Cardinal
- Website: macarthur.irvingisd.net

MacArthur High School is a public high school in Irving, Texas. Opened in 1963, it is named for the American General of the Army Douglas MacArthur. In 2010, the school was rated "Academically Recognized" by the Texas Education Agency. In 2021–22, the school was rated by the Texas Education Agency as follows: C overall, C for Student Achievement, B for School Progress, and C for Closing the Gaps.

== History ==
MacArthur High School, named after General Douglas MacArthur, opened in 1963. A Junior ROTC program began in the 1973–74 school year.

== Student body ==
As of 2024, the total minority enrollment at the high school was 93%, and 80% of the school's students were economically disadvantaged.

== Academic ratings ==
In 2009, the school was rated "Academically Acceptable" by the Texas Education Agency. In 2010, the school was rated "Academically Recognized" by the Texas Education Agency.

In 2021–22, the school was rated by the Texas Education Agency as follows: C overall, C for Student Achievement, B for School Progress, and C for Closing the Gaps.

== Sports ==
In 2011, the MacArthur girls basketball team won the state tournament. Coach Suzie Oelschlegel was named the Coach of the Year by the National Federation of State High School Associations.

In 2014–15, Josh Hawley played basketball for the school in his senior year, averaged 18 points and 12 rebounds per game leading the MacArthur High School basketball team to a 31–5 record, and was named Irving Independent School District MVP, all-region, and first team all-state.

== Controversies ==
=== Student arrest ===
A 14-year-old student, Ahmed Mohamed, was arrested on September 14, 2015, for bringing an alleged hoax bomb to school, questioned, and released. Under Texas law, it is illegal to possess a "hoax bomb" with an intent to "make another believe that the hoax bomb is an explosive or incendiary device" or to "cause [an] alarm or reaction of any type by an official of a public safety agency or volunteer agency organized to deal with emergencies".

The episode arose after Mohamed reassembled the parts of a digital clock in an 8-inch (20 cm) pencil container, and then brought it to school to show his teachers. His engineering teacher, upon seeing the clock advised him to keep the device in his backpack for the rest of the school day. Mohamed, however, later plugged it in during his English class and set a time on the clock. When the clock alarm started beeping, his English teacher confiscated the clock and reported him to the school principal, and the local police were called. The police questioned him for an hour and a half. He was handcuffed, taken into custody, and transported to a juvenile detention facility where he was fingerprinted and his mug shot was taken. He was then released to his parents. According to local police, the reason for his arrest was that they initially suspected he may have purposely caused a bomb scare. Police determined that he had no malicious intent, and he was not charged with any crime. The case was not pursued further by the juvenile justice authorities, but he was suspended from the school and offered no apology.

His family then sent a demand letter on November 23, 2015, saying they would file a lawsuit if they did not receive $15 million ($20,000,000 in current dollar terms) in financial compensation and a public apology from the City of Irving and the Irving School District. His family then filed a lawsuit against the City of Irving and the school district on August 8, 2016. On May 19, 2017, a federal judge dismissed the lawsuit, saying the plaintiff presented no facts demonstrating intentional discrimination against Mohamed. On March 13, 2018, another federal lawsuit filed by Ahmed Mohamed's father against the Irving Independent School District, the city of Irving, and several specific individuals, was dismissed with prejudice and with the court ordering Mohamed's family to bear all the costs of the lawsuit.

=== LGBTQ+ stickers policy ===
In August 2021, after some teachers posted small rainbow stickers — a symbol of the gay pride movement — outside their classrooms to indicate to students that they were LGBTQ allies, the high school administration required that the stickers be taken down, and they were scraped off by the school. The administration later said in a statement that decorations in classrooms, hallways or offices must be “curriculum driven and neutral in viewpoint” to “ensure that all students feel safe regardless of background or identity.”

Word spread among students that the new principal had allegedly fired a teacher who was openly gay and was forcing teachers to remove "safe space" stickers. Some students then organized a walkout for LGBTQ+ rights on September 22 between 6th and 7th periods.

== Notable people ==
=== Alumni ===
- Kole Ayi, National Football League (NFL) player
- Akin Ayodele, NFL player
- Brian Bosworth, NFL player and actor
- Ron Brooks, NFL player
- Patrick Chukwurah, Nigerian NFL player
- Don Davis, Member of the U.S. House of Representatives from North Carolina
- Josh Hawley (born 1996), Israeli Basketball Premier League player
- Alexis Jones, WNBA basketball player
- Andrew Jones (born 1997), college basketball player
- Peter MacNicol, Emmy Award-winning actor
- Mike Phillips (born 1950), Major League Baseball (MLB) player
- Steve Railsback, actor
- Odyssey Sims (born 1992), WNBA basketball player
- Rusty Troy (born 1966), Major Indoor Soccer League, National Professional Soccer League, American Professional Soccer League, and USISL soccer player
- Randy Waldrum (born 1956), soccer player and coach
- Kerry Wood (born 1977), MLB player

=== Faculty ===
- David Beaty, football coach, 2002–05
- Phil Bennett, football coach, 1983
- Melvin Robertson, football coach, 1988–90
