= Kamaka Hepa =

American basketball player (born 2000)

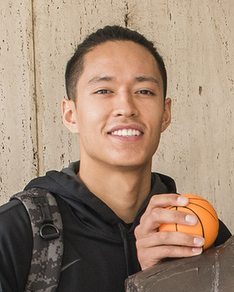
- Hepa in 2018

No. 44 – KK Cibona
- Position: Power forward
- League: Basketball Bundesliga

Personal information
- Born: January 27, 2000 (age 26) Barrow, Alaska, U.S. (now Utqiagvik, Alaska)
- Listed height: 6 ft 10 in (2.08 m)
- Listed weight: 215 lb (98 kg)

Career information
- High school: Barrow (Barrow, Alaska); Jefferson (Portland, Oregon)
- College: Texas (2018–2021); Hawaii (2021–2023)
- NBA draft: 2023: undrafted
- Playing career: 2023–present

Career history
- 2023-2024: Zastal Zielona Góra
- 2024: Rīgas Zeļļi
- 2024-2025: Fraport Skyliners
- 2025-present: KK Cibona

Career highlights
- Croatian League champion (2026); NIT champion (2019)
Medals
Men's basketball
Representing United States
FIBA Americas U18 Championship
Gold medal – first place	2018 Canada	Team

Kamaka Qapqan Hepa (born January 27, 2000) is an American professional basketball player for KK Cibona. He played college basketball for the Hawaii Rainbow Warriors and the Texas Longhorns.

== Early life ==
Hepa was born and brought up in Barrow, Alaska (now known as Utqiagvik), the northernmost community in the United States. He grew up playing club basketball for the Alaska Mountaineers, with whom he won tournaments in North Carolina and California. As a freshman and sophomore, Hepa played for Barrow High School. In each season, he led his team to the Class 3A state title and was named Alaska Gatorade Player of the Year.

In March 2016, Hepa moved to Portland, Oregon to gain more exposure and to play for Portland Basketball Club on the Amateur Athletic Union circuit. He also enrolled at Jefferson High School, where he played under head coach Pat Strickland. As a junior, Hepa averaged 16.4 points and 11.3 rebounds per game, leading Jefferson to its first Class 6A state title. In his senior season, he led his team to a Class 6A runner-up finish. After averaging 16.5 points, 10.4 rebounds and 6.2 blocks per game, he was named Oregon Gatorade Player of the Year. On October 31, 2017, Hepa committed to playing college basketball for Texas as a four-star recruit.

== College career ==
In February 2019, as a freshman, Hepa suffered a head injury in practice and missed two games in concussion protocol. On February 27, 2019, in his first career start, he scored a freshman season-high 11 points in an 84–83 loss to Baylor. He finished the season averaging 1.9 points and 1.6 rebounds in 10.3 minutes per game. On January 15, 2020, in his sophomore season, Hepa scored a career-high 15 points and four rebounds in a 76–64 win over Oklahoma State. As a sophomore, he averaged 2.9 points and two rebounds in 13.5 minutes per game. In his junior season, he played nine games and averaged 2.9 points in 6.4 minutes per game.

In 2021, Hepa was named an Arthur Ashe Jr. Sports Scholar by Diverse: Issues In Higher Education.

On April 25, 2021 Hepa announced that he would transfer to Hawaii. In 27 games, Hepa averaged 9.4 points in 28.1 minutes per game.

== Professional career ==
On July 3, 2023, Hepa was included in the New Orleans Pelicans 2023 Summer League roster.

On August 19, 2023, he signed with Zastal Zielona Góra of the Polish Basketball League. In early December, he temporarily returned to the United States due to the sudden death of his father. He was supposed to return, but he officially parted ways with team by mutual agreement on January 14, 2024.

On June 25, 2024, he signed with Skyliners Frankfurt of the Basketball Bundesliga (BBL).

On August 19, 2025, Hepa signed with KK Cibona of the ABA League 2 and the Croatian League. He averaged 10.1 points, 4.8 rebounds, and 1.3 assists per game. Hepa re-signed with the team on July 13, 2026.

== National team career ==
Hepa represented the United States at the 2018 FIBA Under-18 Americas Championship in St. Catharines, Ontario. He averaged 3.3 points and five rebounds per game, winning a gold medal.

== Career statistics ==
Legend
GP	Games played	GS	Games started	MPG	Minutes per game
FG%	Field goal percentage	3P%	3-point field goal percentage	FT%	Free throw percentage
RPG	Rebounds per game	APG	Assists per game	SPG	Steals per game
BPG	Blocks per game	PPG	Points per game	**Bold**	Career high

=== College ===
Year	Team	GP	GS	MPG	FG%	3P%	FT%	RPG	APG	SPG	BPG	PPG
2018–19	Texas	27	1	10.3	.291	.310	**.857**	1.6	.3	.0	.3	1.9
2019–20	Texas	22	10	13.5	.361	.292	.667	2.0	.6	.2	.6	2.9
2020–21	Texas	9	1	6.4	**.500**	**.500**	.000	1.0	.1	.1	.2	2.9
2021–22	Hawaii	27	27	28.1	.440	.396	.804	5.0	1.4	.4	.7	9.4
2022–23	Hawaii	**33**	**33**	**32.6**	.424	.387	.842	**6.6**	**1.5**	**.5**	**.8**	**11.5**
Career		118	72	20.9	.413	.374	.808	3.8	.9	.3	.6	6.6

== Personal life ==
Hepa's father, Roland Hepa, died in December 2023. He was originally from Kapa'a, Hawaii and was of Native Hawaiian and Filipino descent. Hepa's mother, Taqulik (née Opie), is an Iñupiaq from Utqiagvik. She played basketball for Barrow High School, while his father was a multi-sport athlete in high school.

Hepa's older sister, Lynette, was a standout basketball player for Barrow High School before playing collegiately at Fort Lewis College. On November 23, 2015, his half-brother, Radford Kawika Hepa, was shot and killed in Anchorage, Alaska. Kamaka’s younger brother, Keoni, is a collegiate football player at Simon Fraser.
