= 2017–18 Iowa State Cyclones men's basketball team =

American college basketball season

2017–18 Iowa State Cyclones men's basketball

Puerto Rico Tip-Off champions
- Conference: Big 12 Conference
- Record: 13–18 (4–14 Big 12)
- Head coach: Steve Prohm (3rd season)
- Assistant coaches: William Small; Daniyal Robinson; Neill Berry
- Home arena: Hilton Coliseum

2017–18 Big 12 men's basketball standings
	Conf.				Overall
Team	W		L	PCT	W		L	PCT
No. 4 Kansas †	13	–	5	.722	31	–	8	.795
No. 14 Texas Tech	11	–	7	.611	27	–	10	.730
No. 15 West Virginia	11	–	7	.611	26	–	11	.703
Kansas State	10	–	8	.556	25	–	12	.676
TCU	9	–	9	.500	21	–	12	.636
Baylor	8	–	10	.444	19	–	15	.559
Texas	8	–	10	.444	19	–	15	.559
Oklahoma State	8	–	10	.444	21	–	15	.583
Oklahoma	8	–	10	.444	18	–	14	.563
Iowa State	4	–	14	.222	13	–	18	.419
† 2018 Big 12 Tournament winner Rankings from AP poll

The 2017–18 Iowa State Cyclones men's basketball team represented Iowa State University during the 2017–18 NCAA Division I men's basketball season. The Cyclones were coached by Steve Prohm, who was in his third season at Iowa State. They played their home games at Hilton Coliseum in Ames, Iowa as members of the Big 12 Conference. They finished the season 13–18, 4–14 in Big 12 play to finish in last place. They lost in the first round of the Big 12 tournament to Texas.

== Previous season ==
The Cyclones finished the 2016–17 season 24–11, 12–6 in Big 12 play to finish in a three-way tie for second place. They defeated Oklahoma State, TCU, and West Virginia to win the Big 12 Conference tournament. As a result, they earned the conference's automatic bid to the NCAA tournament as a No. 5 seed. They defeated Nevada in the first round of the NCAA Tournament before losing in the second round to Purdue.

== Offseason ==
=== Departures ===
Offseason departures
Name	Position	Reason
Monté Morris	Guard	Graduated/NBA draft
Naz Mitrou-Long	Guard	Graduated
Matt Thomas	Guard	Graduated
Deonte Burton	Forward	Graduated
Darrell Bowie	Forward	Graduated
Merrill Holden	Forward	Graduated
Stuart Nezlek	Center	Graduated
Simeon Carter	Forward	Transferred to Georgia Southern
Ray Kasongo	Forward	Transferred

=== 2017 recruiting class ===
College recruiting
Name	Hometown	School	Height	Weight	Commit date
Lindell Wigginton; PG #5	Dartmouth, NS	Oak Hill Academy	6 ft 2 in (1.88 m)	184 lb (83 kg)	Oct 21, 2016
Lindell Wigginton; PG #5	Recruit ratings: Scout: Rivals: 247Sports: ESPN: (89)				
Terrence Lewis; SG #24	Milwaukee	Riverside	6 ft 5 in (1.96 m)	195 lb (88 kg)	Aug 9, 2016
Terrence Lewis; SG #24	Recruit ratings: Scout: Rivals: 247Sports: ESPN: (85)				
Overall recruit ranking: Scout: 58 Rivals: 26 247Sports: 58 ESPN: 20
Note: In many cases, Scout, Rivals, 247Sports, On3, and ESPN may conflict in their listings of height and weight.; In these cases, the average was taken. ESPN grades are on a 100-point scale.; Sources: "Iowa State 2016 Basketball Commitments". Rivals.; "2017 Iowa State Basketball Commits". Scout.; "ESPN". ESPN.; "Scout.com Team Recruiting Rankings". Scout.; "2017 Team Ranking". Rivals.

=== Incoming transfers ===
Incoming transfers
Name	Position	Hometown	Previous school	Remaining eligibility	Notes
Jeff Beverly	Forward	League City, Texas	UTSA	1	Beverly was eligible to play immediately.
Hans Brase	Forward	Clover, South Carolina	Princeton	1	Brase was eligible to play immediately.
Zoran Talley	Forward	Merrillville, Indiana	Old Dominion	2	Talley was eligible to play immediately.
Marial Shayok	Forward	Blairstown, New Jersey	Virginia	1	Shayok had to sit out the 2017–18 season due to NCAA eligibility rules.
Michael Jacobson	Forward	Waukee, Iowa	Nebraska	2	Jacobson had to sit out the 2017–18 season due to NCAA eligibility rules.

== Future recruits ==
=== 2018–19 team recruits ===
College recruiting (2018)
Name	Hometown	School	Height	Weight	Commit date
Zion Griffin; PF	Darien, Illinois	Hinsdale South High School	6 ft 6 in (1.98 m)	208 lb (94 kg)	Sep 12, 2017
Zion Griffin; PF	Recruit ratings: Scout: Rivals: 247Sports: ESPN: (80)				
Tyrese Haliburton; PG	Oshkosh, Wisconsin	North High School	6 ft 5 in (1.96 m)	170 lb (77 kg)	Sep 18, 2017
Tyrese Haliburton; PG	Recruit ratings: Scout: Rivals: 247Sports: ESPN: (78)				
George Conditt IV; PF	Chicago	Corliss High School	6 ft 10 in (2.08 m)	200 lb (91 kg)	Oct 2, 2017
George Conditt IV; PF	Recruit ratings: Scout: Rivals: 247Sports: ESPN: (77)				
Talen Horton-Tucker; SF	Chicago	Simeon Career Academy	6 ft 5 in (1.96 m)	210 lb (95 kg)	Oct 26, 2017
Talen Horton-Tucker; SF	Recruit ratings: Scout: Rivals: 247Sports: ESPN: (84)				
Overall recruit ranking:
Note: In many cases, Scout, Rivals, 247Sports, On3, and ESPN may conflict in their listings of height and weight.; In these cases, the average was taken. ESPN grades are on a 100-point scale.; Sources: "2018 Team Ranking". Rivals.

== Roster ==
2017–18 Iowa State Cyclones men's basketball team
Players
Coaches

Pos.	#	Name	Height	Weight	Year	Previous school	Hometown
G	1	Nick Weiler-Babb	6 ft 5 in (1.96 m)	205 lb (93 kg)	RS Jr	James Martin; Arkansas	Arlington, Texas
F	2	Cameron Lard	6 ft 9 in (2.06 m)	220 lb (100 kg)	RS Fr	Pro Vision Academy	Natchitoches, Louisiana
G	3	Marial Shayok (redshirt)	6 ft 5 in (1.96 m)	196 lb (89 kg)	Sr	Blair; Virginia	Blairstown, New Jersey
G	4	Donovan Jackson (C)	6 ft 2 in (1.88 m)	175 lb (79 kg)	Sr	Pius XI; Iowa Western CC	Milwaukee
G	5	Lindell Wigginton	6 ft 2 in (1.88 m)	184 lb (83 kg)	Fr	Oak Hill	Dartmouth, Nova Scotia
F	12	Michael Jacobson (redshirt)	6 ft 9 in (2.06 m)	239 lb (108 kg)	Jr	Waukee; Nebraska	Waukee, Iowa
G	13	Jakolby Long	6 ft 5 in (1.96 m)	207 lb (94 kg)	So	Mustang	Mustang, Oklahoma
F	23	Zoran Talley	6 ft 7 in (2.01 m)	200 lb (91 kg)	RS Jr	Merrillville; Old Dominion	Merrillville, Indiana
G	24	Terrence Lewis	6 ft 5 in (1.96 m)	195 lb (88 kg)	Fr	Riverside	Milwaukee
F	30	Hans Brase	6 ft 9 in (2.06 m)	235 lb (107 kg)	RS Sr	The Hill School; Princeton	Clover, South Carolina
F	33	Solomon Young	6 ft 8 in (2.03 m)	235 lb (107 kg)	So	Sacramento	Sacramento, California
F	55	Jeff Beverly	6 ft 6 in (1.98 m)	250 lb (113 kg)	RS Sr	Clear Springs; Texas A&M CC; McLennan CC; UTSA	League City, Texas

Head coach

- Steve Prohm (Alabama)

Assistant coach(es)

- William Small (Belhaven)
- Daniyal Robinson (Little Rock)
- Neill Berry (Southeastern Louisiana)

Legend

- (C) Team captain
- (S) Suspended
- (I) Ineligible
- (W) Walk-on
- Injured
- Current redshirt

Roster

== Schedule and results ==
Date time, TV	Rank^{#}	Opponent^{#}	Result	Record	High points	High rebounds	High assists	Site (attendance) city, state
Exhibition
November 5, 2017*; 5:00 pm, Cyclones.tv		Emporia State	W 77–68	0–0	20 – Jackson	8 – Talley Jr.	4 – Weiler-Babb	Hilton Coliseum (13,861); Ames, Iowa
Regular season
November 10, 2017*; 8:00 pm, SECN		at Missouri	L 59–74	0–1	14 – Weiler-Babb	8 – Young	5 – Weiler-Babb	Mizzou Arena (15,061); Columbia, Missouri
November 13, 2017*; 7:00 pm, Cyclones.tv		Milwaukee	L 56–74	0–2	11 – Tied	9 – Talley Jr.	3 – Wigginton	Hilton Coliseum (13,853); Ames, Iowa
November 16, 2017*; 4:30 pm, ESPNU		vs. Appalachian State; Puerto Rico Tip-Off quarterfinals	W 104–98	1–2	26 – Jackson	11 – Lard	7 – Weiler-Babb	HTC Center (703); Conway, South Carolina
November 17, 2017*; 6:00 pm, ESPNU		vs. Tulsa; Puerto Rico Tip-Off semifinals	W 80–78	2–2	24 – Jackson	14 – Weiler-Babb	8 – Weiler-Babb	HTC Center (1,827); Conway, South Carolina
November 19, 2017*; 6:30 pm, ESPN2		vs. Boise State; Puerto Rico Tip-Off Championship	W 75–64	3–2	26 – Jackson	10 – Wigginton	11 – Weiler-Babb	HTC Center (2,119); Conway, South Carolina
November 25, 2017*; 7:00 pm, Cyclones.tv		Western Illinois	W 70–45	4–2	21 – Wigginton	9 – Brase	10 – Weiler-Babb	Hilton Coliseum (13,647); Ames, Iowa
December 4, 2017*; 8:00 pm, ESPNU		Northern Illinois	W 94–80	5–2	28 – Wigginton	7 – Wigginton	11 – Weiler-Babb	Hilton Coliseum (13,894); Ames, Iowa
December 7, 2017*; 7:00 pm, ESPN2		Iowa; Iowa Corn Cy-Hawk Series	W 84–78	6–2	24 – Wigginton	7 – Tied	10 – Weiler-Babb	Hilton Coliseum (14,384); Ames, Iowa
December 10, 2017*; 5:00 pm, Cyclones.tv		Alcorn State	W 78–58	7–2	25 – Jackson	11 – Lard	9 – Weiler-Babb	Hilton Coliseum (14,112); Ames, Iowa
December 16, 2017*; 3:30 pm, MC22		vs. Northern Iowa; Big Four Classic	W 76–65	8–2	20 – Wigginton	9 – Weiler-Babb	4 – Weiler-Babb	Wells Fargo Arena (13,828); Des Moines, Iowa
December 20, 2017*; 6:00 pm, Cyclones.tv		Maryland Eastern Shore	W 55–49	9–2	15 – Lard	12 – Tied	6 – Weiler-Babb	Hilton Coliseum (13,177); Ames, Iowa
December 29, 2017; 8:00 pm, ESPNU		Kansas State	L 75–91	9–3 (0–1)	23 – Wigginton	9 – Lard	4 – Weiler-Babb	Hilton Coliseum (14,384); Ames, Iowa
January 1, 2018; 5:00 pm, ESPN2		Texas	L 70–74 ^{OT}	9–4 (0–2)	24 – Jackson	16 – Lard	9 – Weiler-Babb	Hilton Coliseum (14,131); Ames, Iowa
January 6, 2018; 3:00 pm, ESPNU		at Oklahoma State	L 87–96 ^{OT}	9–5 (0–3)	30 – Jackson	9 – Weiler-Babb	11 – Weiler-Babb	Gallagher-Iba Arena (5,568); Stillwater, Oklahoma
January 9, 2018; 8:00 pm, ESPN2		at No. 12 Kansas	L 78–83	9–6 (0–4)	27 – Wigginton	10 – Lard	8 – Weiler-Babb	Allen Fieldhouse (16,300); Lawrence, Kansas
January 13, 2018; 2:00 pm, ESPNews		Baylor	W 75–65	10–6 (1–4)	30 – Wigginton	12 – Young	10 – Weiler-Babb	Hilton Coliseum (14,283); Ames, Iowa
January 17, 2018; 8:00 pm, ESPNU		at No. 24 TCU	L 73–96	10–7 (1–5)	19 – Jackson	9 – Lard	6 – Weiler-Babb	Schollmaier Arena (6,894); Fort Worth, Texas
January 20, 2018; 1:00 pm, ESPNU		No. 8 Texas Tech	W 70–52	11–7 (2–5)	18 – Lard	9 – Young	5 – Weiler-Babb	Hilton Coliseum (14,384); Ames, Iowa
January 22, 2018; 6:00 pm, ESPNU		at Texas	L 57–73	11–8 (2–6)	15 – Tied	12 – Lard	3 – Tied	Frank Erwin Center (9,123); Austin, Texas
January 27, 2018*; 3:00 pm, ESPNU		No. 22 Tennessee; Big 12/SEC Challenge	L 45–68	11–9	13 – Jackson	9 – Lard	3 – Wigginton	Hilton Coliseum (14,384); Ames, Iowa
January 31, 2018; 6:00 pm, ESPNU		No. 15 West Virginia	W 93–77	12–9 (3–6)	25 – Jackson	13 – Lard	7 – Jackson	Hilton Coliseum (14,219); Ames, Iowa
February 3, 2018; 7:00 pm, ESPN2		at Baylor	L 67–81	12–10 (3–7)	15 – Jackson	9 – Lard	8 – Wigginton	Ferrell Center (6,852); Waco, Texas
February 7, 2018; 8:00 pm, ESPN2		at No. 7 Texas Tech	L 58–76	12–11 (3–8)	22 – Lard	9 – Young	5 – Wigginton	United Supermarkets Arena (13,221); Lubbock, Texas
February 10, 2018; 1:00 pm, ESPN		No. 17 Oklahoma	W 88–80	13–11 (4–8)	26 – Wigginton	17 – Lard	5 – Wigginton	Hilton Coliseum (14,384); Ames, Iowa
February 13, 2018; 6:00 pm, ESPN2		No. 13 Kansas	L 77–83	13–12 (4–9)	19 – Lard	11 – Lard	5 – Tied	Hilton Coliseum (14,384); Ames, Iowa
February 17, 2018; 12:00 pm, ESPNU		at Kansas State	L 66–78	13–13 (4–10)	15 – Lard	8 – Lard	5 – Tied	Bramlage Coliseum (9,645); Manhattan, Kansas
February 21, 2018; 7:00 pm, Cyclones.tv		TCU	W 89–83	13–14 (4–11)	27 – Jackson	8 – Lard	5 – Wigginton	Hilton Coliseum (14,063); Ames, Iowa
February 24, 2018; 5:00 pm, ESPNU		at No. 21 West Virginia	L 70–85	13–15 (4–12)	29 – Wigginton	10 – Lard	9 – Talley Jr.	WVU Coliseum (14,205); Morgantown, West Virginia
February 27, 2018; 6:00 pm, ESPNU		Oklahoma State	L 71–80	13–16 (4–13)	21 – Wigginton	6 – Lard	4 – Jackson	Hilton Coliseum (14,258); Ames, Iowa
March 2, 2018; 8:00 pm, ESPN2		at Oklahoma	L 60–81	13–17 (4–14)	20 – Wigginton	15 – Beverly	3 – Lard	Lloyd Noble Center (11,598); Norman, Oklahoma
Big 12 Tournament
March 7, 2018; 8:00 pm, ESPNU	(10)	vs. (7) Texas; First round	L 64–68	13–18	20 – Wigginton	9 – Talley Jr.	8 – Jackson	Sprint Center (17,752); Kansas City, Missouri
*Non-conference game. ^{#}Rankings from AP poll. (#) Tournament seedings in parentheses. MW=Midwest Region. All times are in Central Time.

== Awards and honors ==
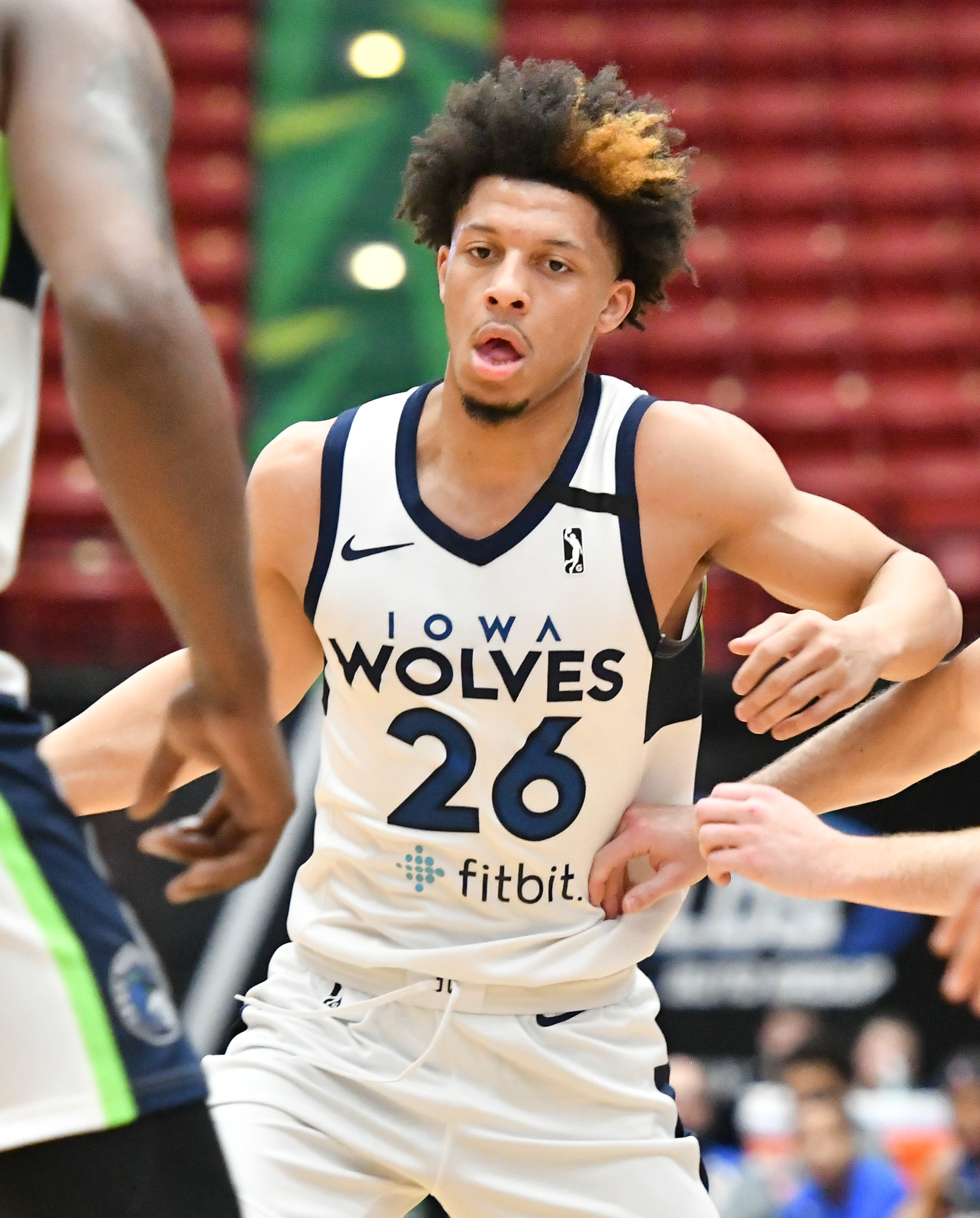
Lindell Wigginton

- Big 12 Player of the Week

Nick Weiler-Babb (November 20)

- Big 12 Newcomer of the Week

Lindell Wigginton (December 11)
Lindell Wigginton (January 15)
Cameron Lard (January 22)

== See also ==
- 2017–18 Iowa State Cyclones women's basketball team
