= 2017–18 Big 12 Conference men's basketball season =

2017–18 Big 12 Men's Basketball Season
- League: NCAA Division I
- Sport: Basketball
- Teams: 10
- TV partner(s): CBS, ESPN, FSN

2017–18 NCAA Division I men's basketball season
- 2018 Big 12 Champions: Kansas
- Season MVP: Devonte' Graham
- Top scorer: Trae Young

Big 12 tournament
- Champions: Kansas
- Runners-up: West Virginia
- Finals MVP: Malik Newman

Big 12 Basketball seasons
- ← 2016–17 2018–19 →

2017–18 Big 12 men's basketball standings
	Conf.				Overall
Team	W		L	PCT	W		L	PCT
No. 4 Kansas †	13	–	5	.722	31	–	8	.795
No. 14 Texas Tech	11	–	7	.611	27	–	10	.730
No. 15 West Virginia	11	–	7	.611	26	–	11	.703
Kansas State	10	–	8	.556	25	–	12	.676
TCU	9	–	9	.500	21	–	12	.636
Baylor	8	–	10	.444	19	–	15	.559
Texas	8	–	10	.444	19	–	15	.559
Oklahoma State	8	–	10	.444	21	–	15	.583
Oklahoma	8	–	10	.444	18	–	14	.563
Iowa State	4	–	14	.222	13	–	18	.419
† 2018 Big 12 Tournament winner Rankings from AP poll

The 2017–18 Big 12 men's basketball season began with practices in October 2017, followed by the start of the 2017–18 NCAA Division I men's basketball season in November. Regular season conference play started on December 29, 2017 and concluded on March 3, 2018. The Big 12 tournament began on March 7, with the championship game on March 10, played at the Sprint Center in Kansas City, Missouri. Kansas won the regular season conference title, their NCAA record 14th consecutive year winning the regular season title.

== Coaches ==
=== Coaching changes ===
On March 18, 2017, head coach Brad Underwood left Oklahoma State to accept the head coaching position at Illinois after one year at OSU. The school promoted assistant coach Mike Boynton Jr. to head coach on March 24.

=== Head coaches ===
Note: Stats are through the end of the season. All stats and records are from time at current school only.

Team	Head coach	Previous job	Seasons at school	Overall record	Big 12 record	NCAA tournaments	NCAA Final Fours	NCAA Championships
Baylor	Scott Drew	Valparaiso	14th	298–195 (.604)	115–137 (.456)	7	0	0
Iowa State	Steve Prohm	Murray State	3rd	60–41 (.594)	26–28 (.481)	2	0	0
Kansas	Bill Self	Illinois	15th	447–96 (.823)	208–46 (.819)	15	3	1
Kansas State	Bruce Weber	Illinois	6th	125–80 (.610)	55–53 (.509)	4	0	0
Oklahoma	Lon Kruger	UNLV	7th	140–91 (.606)	65–61 (.516)	6	1	0
Oklahoma State	Mike Boynton	Oklahoma State (asst.)	1st	21–15 (.583)	8–10 (.444)	0	0	0
TCU	Jamie Dixon	Pittsburgh	2nd	45–27 (.625)	15–21 (.417)	1	0	0
Texas	Shaka Smart	VCU	3rd	50–50 (.500)	23–31 (.426)	2	0	0
Texas Tech	Chris Beard	Little Rock	2nd	45–24 (.652)	25–22 (.532)	1	0	0
West Virginia	Bob Huggins	Kansas State	11th	255–130 (.662)	62–46 (.574)	9	1	0

== Preseason ==
Big 12 recruits at the 2017 McDonald's All-American Boys Game

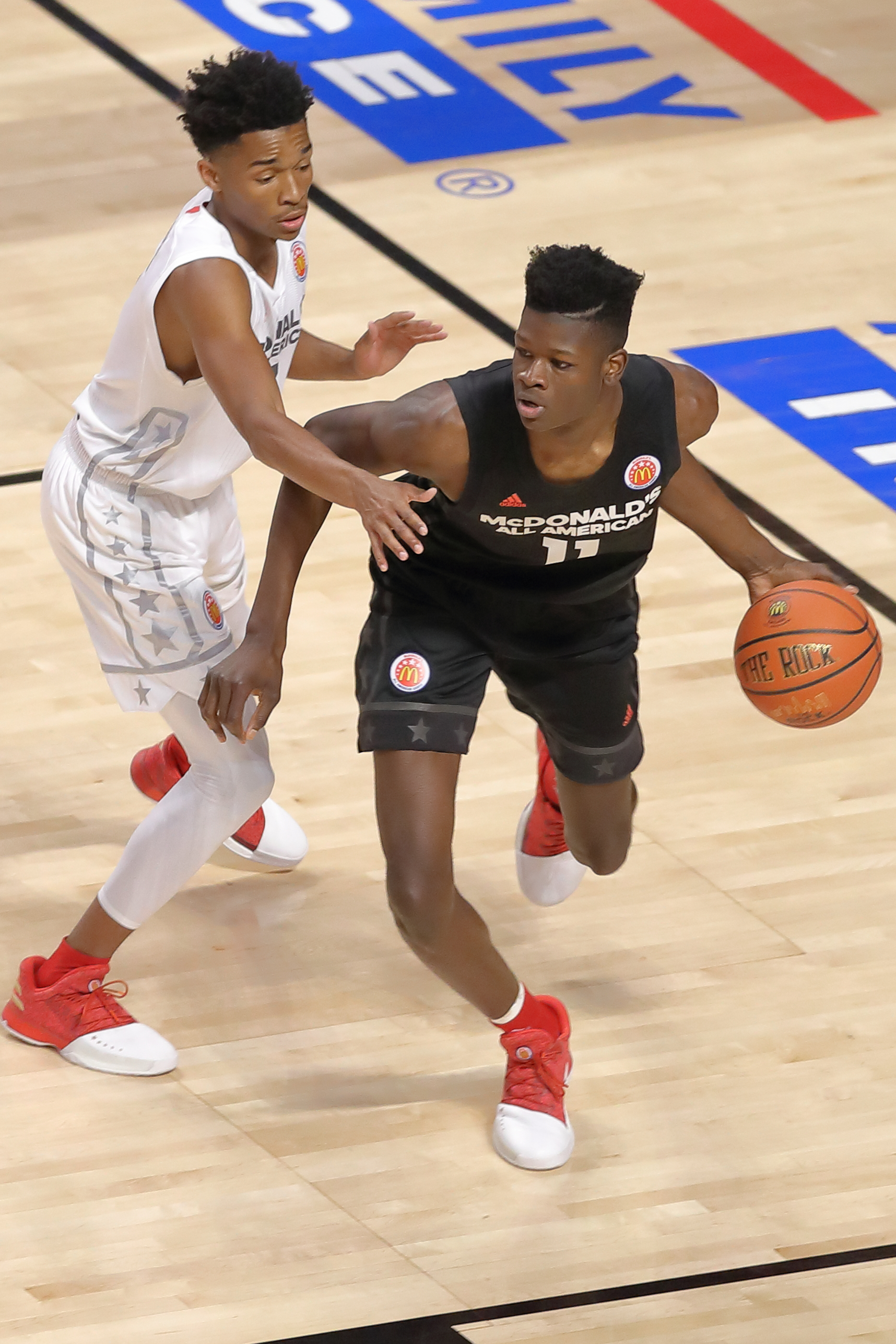
Mohamed Bamba, Texas

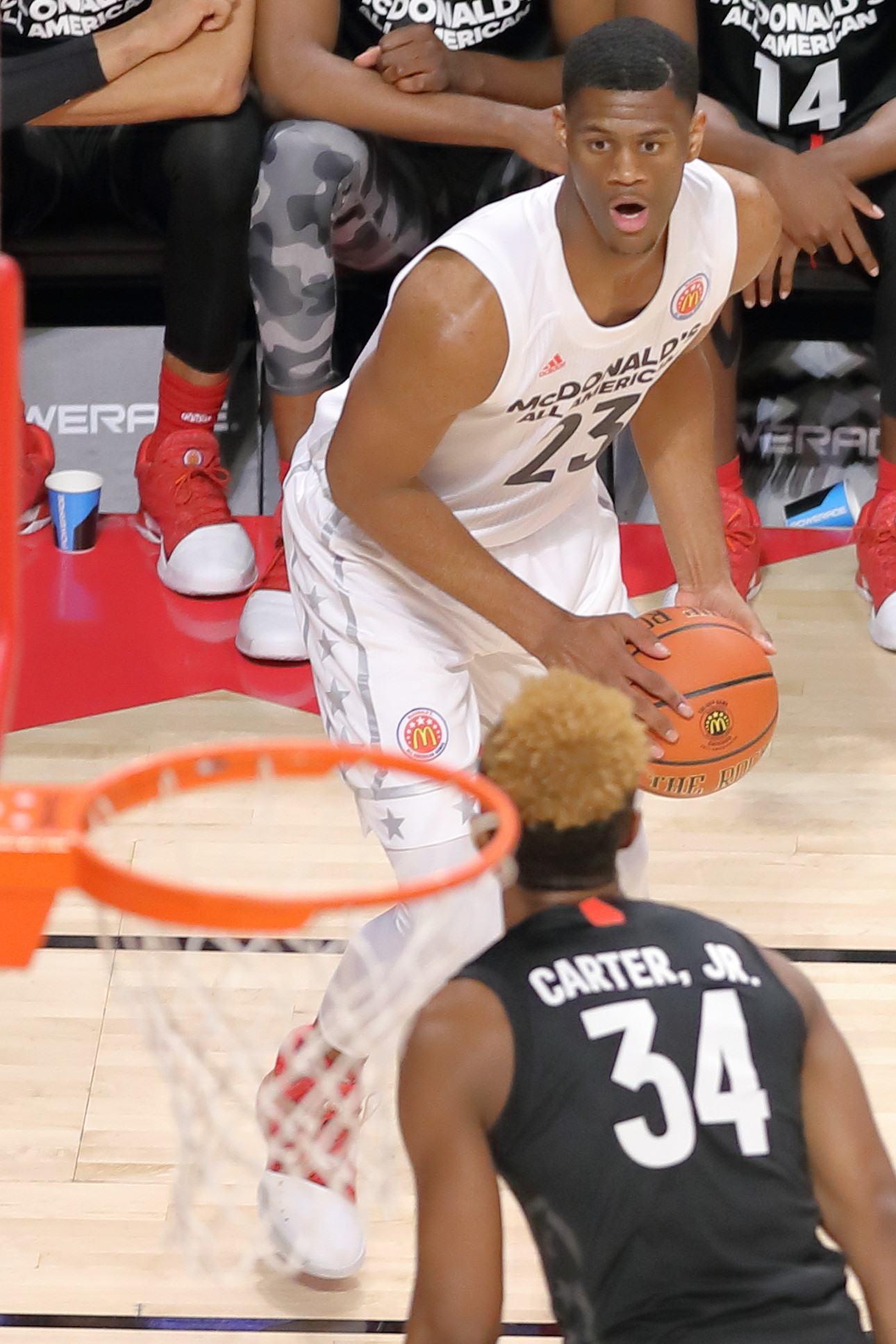
Billy Preston, Kansas

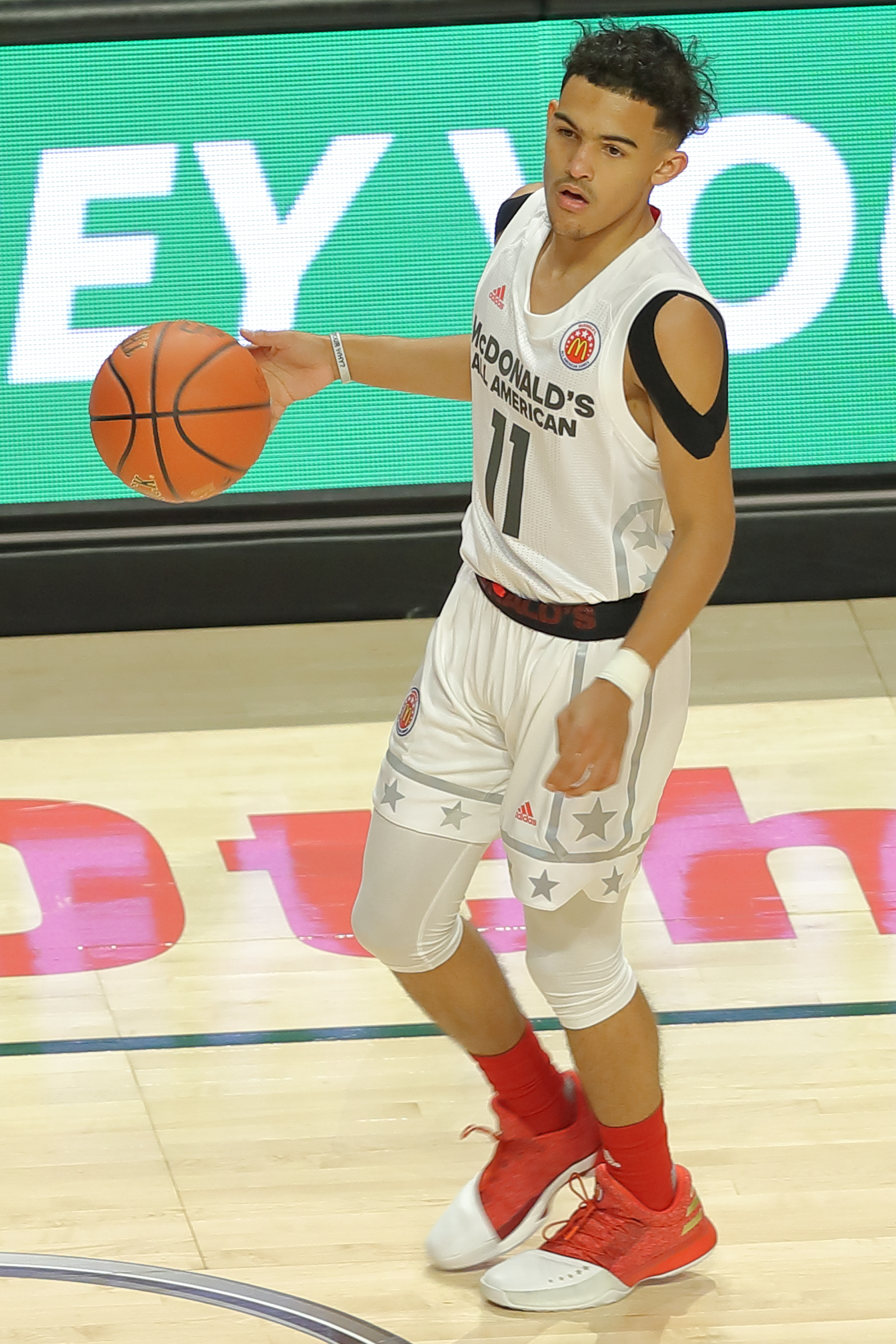
Trae Young, Oklahoma

Big 12 Preseason Poll

	Big 12 Coaches	Points
1.	Kansas (9)	81
2.	West Virginia (1)	71
3.	TCU	64
4.	Texas	49
5.	Baylor	47
6.	Oklahoma	43
7.	Texas Tech	36
8.	Kansas State	27
9.	Iowa State	22
10.	Oklahoma State	10
Reference: (#) first place votes

Pre-Season All-Big 12 Team

Big 12 Coaches
Devonte' Graham, G Kansas
Jeffrey Carroll, G/F Oklahoma State
Vladimir Brodziansky, F TCU
Zach Smith, F Texas Tech
Jevon Carter, G West Virginia

- Player of the Year: Devonte' Graham, Kansas
- Newcomer of the Year: Malik Newman, Kansas
- Freshman of the Year: Mohamed Bamba, Texas

=== Preseason watchlists ===
Wooden	Naismith	Robertson	Cousy	West	Erving	Malone	Abdul-Jabbar	Olson
Devonte' Graham - Kansas; Malik Newman - Kansas; Trae Young - Oklahoma; Jeffrey Carroll - Oklahoma State; Mohamed Bamba - Texas; Jevon Carter - West Virginia	DeVonte' Graham - Kansas; Malik Newman - Kansas; Jeffrey Carroll - Oklahoma State; Mohamed Bamba - Texas; Jevon Carter - West Virginia	DeVonte' Graham - Kansas; Mohamed Bamba - Texas; Jevon Carter - West Virginia	Manu Lecomte - Baylor; DeVonte' Graham - Kansas; Trae Young - Oklahoma; Jevon Carter - West Virginia	Malik Newman - Kansas; Andrew Jones - Texas; Daxter Miles, Jr - West Virginia	Jeffrey Carroll - Oklahoma State	Dylan Osetkowski - Texas; Zach Smith - Texas Tech	Vladimir Brodziansky - TCU; Mohamed Bamba - Texas	DeVonte' Graham - Kansas; Jevon Carter - West Virginia

=== Tournaments ===
Team	Tournament	Finish
Baylor	CBE Hall of Fame Classic	Champions
Iowa State	Puerto Rico Tip-Off	Champions
Kansas	Miami Invitational	Won all 4 games
Kansas State	Las Vegas Invitational	3rd Place
Oklahoma	Phil Knight Invitational	5th Place
Oklahoma State	Legends Classic	3rd Place
TCU	Emerald Coast Classic	Champions
Texas	Phil Knight Invitational	4th Place
Texas Tech	Hall of Fame Tip Off	Champions
West Virginia	AdvoCare Invitational	Champions

== Rankings ==
Legend
Increase in ranking
Decrease in ranking
Not ranked previous week

		Pre	Wk 2	Wk 3	Wk 4	Wk 5	Wk 6	Wk 7	Wk 8	Wk 9	Wk 10	Wk 11	Wk 12	Wk 13	Wk 14	Wk 15	Wk 16	Wk 17	Wk 18	Wk 19	Final
Baylor	AP	24	25	22	16	23	21	18	18	RV	RV						RV				
Baylor	C	24		24	16	22	21	18	17	RV	RV	RV					RV		RV		
Iowa State	AP																				
Iowa State	C																				
Kansas	AP	4	4	3	2	2	13	14	11	10	12	10	5	7	10	13	8	6	9	4	
Kansas	C	3		2	2	2	12	13	11	10	12	10	5	7	10	13	8	6	9	3	3
Kansas State	AP					RV							RV	RV			RV		RV	RV	
Kansas State	C					RV							RV	RV	RV		RV		RV	RV	19
Oklahoma	AP	RV	RV	RV	RV	RV	RV	17	12	7	9	4	12	12	17	23	RV	RV			
Oklahoma	C	RV		RV	RV	RV	24	17	12	7	9	6	11	15	18	23	RV	RV	RV		
Oklahoma State	AP					RV		RV	RV						RV	RV					
Oklahoma State	C							RV	RV			RV									
TCU	AP	RV	RV	RV	23	20	14	15	10	16	16	24	RV	RV	RV	RV	RV	RV	RV	RV	
TCU	C	RV		RV	RV	20	14	12	8	15	16	25	RV	RV		RV	RV	RV	RV	RV	
Texas	AP	RV	RV	RV	RV	RV	RV	RV	RV	RV					RV						
Texas	C	RV		RV	RV	RV	RV	RV	RV	RV					RV						
Texas Tech	AP		RV	RV	22	RV	24	21	22	18	8	8	14	10	7	7	6	12	14	14	
Texas Tech	C			RV	22	RV	RV	21	21	18	8	8	14	10	7	6	7	12	13	13	6
West Virginia	AP	11	24	23	19	18	11	10	7	6	2	6	7	15	19	20	21	20	18	15	
West Virginia	C	10		20	19	16	11	10	7	5	2	7	7	11	17	20	21	19	18	14	13

== Regular season ==
=== Conference matrix ===
	Baylor	Iowa State	Kansas	Kansas State	Oklahoma	Oklahoma State	TCU	Texas	Texas Tech	West Virginia
vs. Baylor	—	1–1	1–1	2–0	1–1	0–2	2–0	0–2	1–1	2–0
vs. Iowa State	1–1	—	2–0	2–0	1–1	2–0	2–0	2–0	1–1	1–1
vs. Kansas	1–1	0–2	—	0–2	1–1	2–0	0–2	0–2	1–1	0–2
vs. Kansas State	0–2	0–2	2–0	—	1–1	0–2	1–1	0–2	2–0	2–0
vs. Oklahoma	1–1	1–1	1–1	1–1	—	1–1	0–2	2–0	1–1	2–0
vs. Oklahoma State	2–0	0–2	0–2	2–0	1–1	—	2–0	1–1	1–1	1–1
vs. TCU	0–2	0–2	2–0	1–1	2–0	0–2	—	1–1	2–0	1–1
vs. Texas	2–0	0–2	2–0	2–0	0–2	1–1	1–1	—	1–1	1–1
vs. Texas Tech	1–1	1–1	1–1	0–2	1–1	1–1	0–2	1–1	—	1–1
vs. West Virginia	0–2	1–1	2–0	0–2	0–2	1–1	1–1	1–1	1–1	—
Total	8–10	4–14	13–5	10–8	8–10	8–10	9–9	8–10	11–7	11–7

=== Big 12 vs Power 5 matchups ===
This is a list of the power conference teams (ACC, Big 10, Pac-12 and SEC) the Big 12 plays in the non-conference (Rankings from the AP Poll):

Date	Visitor	Home	Site	Conference	Score
November 10, 2017	No. 25 Texas A&M	No. 11 West Virginia	Ramstein Air Base • Ramstein, GER	SEC	L, 88–65
November 10, 2017	Iowa State	Missouri	Mizzou Arena • Columbia, MO	SEC	L, 74–59
November 14, 2017	No. 4 Kansas	No. 7 Kentucky	United Center • Chicago	SEC	W, 65–61
November 18, 2017	Texas Tech	Boston College	Mohegan Sun Arena • Uncasville, CT	ACC	W, 75–64
November 19, 2017	No. 20 Northwestern	Texas Tech	Mohegan Sun Arena • Uncasville, CT	Big Ten	W, 85–49
November 20, 2017	Oklahoma State	No. 16 Texas A&M	Barclays Center • Brooklyn, NY	SEC	L, 72–55
November 20, 2017	No. 22 Baylor	Wisconsin	Sprint Center • Kansas City, MO	Big Ten	W, 70–65
November 21, 2017	Pittsburgh	Oklahoma State	Barclays Center • Brooklyn, NY	ACC	W, 73–67
November 23, 2017	Oklahoma	Arkansas	Moda Center • Portland, OR	SEC	W, 92–83
November 23, 2017	Kansas State	Arizona State	Orleans Arena • Las Vegas, NV	Pac-12	L, 92–90
November 24, 2017	No. 1 Duke	Texas	Moda Center • Portland, OR	ACC	L, 85–78
November 25, 2017	Missouri	No. 23 West Virginia	HP Field House • Lake Buena Vista, FL	SEC	W, 83–79
November 26, 2017	Oregon	Oklahoma	Moda Center • Portland, OR	Pac-12	W, 90–80
December 2, 2017	No. 2 Kansas	Syracuse	American Airlines Arena • Miami, FL	ACC	W, 76–60
December 3, 2017	Kansas State	Vanderbilt	Memorial Gymnasium • Nashville, TN	SEC	W, 84–79
December 5, 2017	No. 18 Virginia	West Virginia	WVU Coliseum • Morgantown, WV	ACC	W, 68–61
December 6, 2017	Washington	No. 2 Kansas	Sprint Center • Kansas City, MO	Pac-12	L, 74–65
December 7, 2017	Iowa	Iowa State	Hilton Coliseum • Ames, IA	Big Ten	W, 84–78
December 8, 2017	Oklahoma	No. 25 USC	Staples Center • Los Angeles, CA	Pac-12	W, 85–83
December 9, 2017	No. 18 West Virginia	Pittsburgh	Petersen Events Center • Pittsburgh, PA	ACC	W, 69-60
December 10, 2017	No. 16 Arizona State	No. 2 Kansas	Allen Fieldhouse • Lawrence, KS	Pac-12	L, 95-85
December 12, 2017	Michigan	Texas	Frank Erwin Center • Austin, TX	Big Ten	L, 59-52
December 16, 2017	Oklahoma State	No. 24 Florida State	BB&T Center • Sunrise, FL	ACC	W, 71-70
December 16, 2017	No. 13 Kansas	Nebraska	Pinnacle Bank Arena • Lincoln, NE	Big Ten	W, 73-72
December 20, 2017	Kansas State	Washington State	Veterans Memorial Arena • Spokane, WA	Pac-12	W, 68-65
December 21, 2017	No. 14 Kansas	Stanford	Golden 1 Center • Sacramento, CA	Pac-12	W, 75-54
December 22, 2017	Northwestern	No. 17 Oklahoma	Lloyd Noble Center • Norman, OK	Big Ten	W, 104-78
December 22, 2017	Texas	Alabama	Legacy Arena • Birmingham, AL	SEC	W, 66-50
January 27, 2018	Texas A&M	No. 5 Kansas	Allen Fieldhouse • Lawrence, KS	SEC	W, 79–68
January 27, 2018	Kentucky	No. 7 West Virginia	WVU Coliseum • Morgantown, WV	SEC	L, 83–76
January 27, 2018	Baylor	No. 22 Florida	O'Connell Center • Gainesville, FL	SEC	L, 81–60
January 27, 2018	No. 14 Texas Tech	South Carolina	Colonial Life Arena • Columbia, SC	SEC	W, 70–63
January 27, 2018	Georgia	Kansas State	Bramlage Coliseum • Manhattan, KS	SEC	W, 56–51
January 27, 2018	Ole Miss	Texas	Frank Erwin Center • Austin, TX	SEC	W, 85–72
January 27, 2018	No. 12 Oklahoma	Alabama	Coleman Coliseum • Tuscaloosa, AL	SEC	L, 80–73
January 27, 2018	No. 22 Tennessee	Iowa State	Hilton Coliseum • Ames, IA	SEC	L, 68–45
January 27, 2018	TCU	Vanderbilt	Memorial Gymnasium • Nashville, TN	SEC	L, 81–78
January 27, 2018	Oklahoma State	Arkansas	Bud Walton Arena • Fayetteville, AR	SEC	L, 66–65

=== Big 12/SEC Challenge ===
Date	Time	Big 12 team	SEC team	Location	TV	Attendance	Winner	Leader
Sat., Jan. 27	12:00 pm	Baylor	No. 20 Florida	O'Connell Center • Gainesville, FL	ESPN	10,623	Florida (81–60)	SEC (1–0)
Sat., Jan. 27	12:00 pm	No. 14 Texas Tech	South Carolina	Colonial Life Arena • Columbia, SC	ESPN2	14,142	Texas Tech (70–63)	Tied (1–1)
Sat., Jan. 27	2:00 pm	Texas	Ole Miss	Frank Erwin Center • Austin, TX	ESPN2	10,913	Texas (85–72)	Big 12 (2–1)
Sat., Jan. 27	2:00 pm	Kansas State	Georgia	Bramlage Coliseum • Manhattan, KS	ESPNU	10,314	Kansas State (56–51)	Big 12 (3–1)
Sat., Jan. 27	2:15 pm	No. 12 Oklahoma	Alabama	Coleman Coliseum • Tuscaloosa, AL	ESPN	15,383	Alabama (80–73)	Big 12 (3–2)
Sat., Jan. 27	4:00 pm	TCU	Vanderbilt	Memorial Gymnasium • Nashville, TN	ESPN2	9,755	Vanderbilt (81–78)	Tied (3–3)
Sat., Jan. 27	4:00 pm	Iowa State	No. 22 Tennessee	Hilton Coliseum • Ames, IA	ESPNU	14,384	Tennessee (68–45)	SEC (4–3)
Sat., Jan. 27	4:30 pm	No. 5 Kansas	Texas A&M	Allen Fieldhouse • Lawrence, KS	ESPN	16,300	Kansas (79–68)	Tied (4–4)
Sat., Jan. 27	6:00 pm	Oklahoma State	Arkansas	Bud Walton Arena • Fayetteville, AR	ESPN2	18,057	Arkansas (66–65)	SEC (5–4)
Sat., Jan. 27	7:00 pm	No. 7 West Virginia	Kentucky	WVU Coliseum • Morgantown, WV	ESPN	15,835	Kentucky (83–76)	SEC (6–4)
Auburn, LSU, Mississippi State, and Missouri did not participate for the SEC. All times Eastern

== Postseason ==
=== Big 12 tournament ===
- March 7–10, 2018–Big 12 Conference Basketball Tournament, Sprint Center, Kansas City, MO.

2018 Big 12 men's basketball tournament seeds and results
Seed	School	Conf.	Over.	Tiebreaker	First Round March 7	Quarterfinals March 8	Semifinals March 9	Championship March 10
1.	‡† Kansas	13–5	27–7		Bye	#8 Oklahoma State	#4 Kansas State	#3 West Virginia
2.	† Texas Tech	11–7	24–9	1–1 vs. WVU; 1–1 vs. KU	Bye	#7 Texas	#3 West Virginia	
3.	† West Virginia	11–7	24–10	1–1 vs. TTU; 0–2 vs. KU	Bye	#6 Baylor	#2 Texas Tech	#1 Kansas
4.	† Kansas State	10–8	22–11		Bye	#5 TCU	#1 Kansas	
5.	† TCU	9–9	21–11		Bye	#4 Kansas State		
6.	† Baylor	8–10	18–14	5–1 vs. UT, OSU, & OU	Bye	#3 West Virginia		
7.	Texas	8–10	19–14	3–3 vs. BU, OSU, & OU	#10 Iowa State	#2 Texas Tech		
8.	Oklahoma State	8–10	19–14	2–4 vs. BU, UT, & OU; 2–0 vs. KU	#9 Oklahoma	#1 Kansas		
9.	Oklahoma	8–10	18–13	2–4 vs. BU, UT, & OSU; 1–1 vs. KU	#8 Oklahoma State			
10.	Iowa State	4–14	13–18		#7 Texas			
‡ – Big 12 regular season champions, and tournament No. 1 seed. † – Received a single-bye in the conference tournament. Overall records include all games played in the Big 12 tournament.

==== Bracket ====
First round Wednesday, March 7
8	Oklahoma State	71
9	Oklahoma	60
7	Texas	68
10	Iowa State	64

Quarterfinals; Thursday, March 8
1	Kansas	82
8	Oklahoma State	68
4	Kansas State	66^{OT}
5	TCU	64
2	Texas Tech	73
7	Texas	69
3	West Virginia	78
6	Baylor	65

Semifinals; Friday, March 9
1	Kansas	83
4	Kansas State	67
2	Texas Tech	63
3	West Virginia	66

Championship; Saturday, March 10
1	Kansas	81
3	West Virginia	70

=== NCAA tournament ===
Seed	Region	School	First Round	Second Round	Sweet 16	Elite Eight	Final Four	Championship
1	Midwest	Kansas	#16 Penn W, 76–60	#8 Seton Hall W, 83–79	#5 Clemson W, 80–76	#2 Duke W, 85–81^{OT}	#1 Villanova L, 79–95	
3	East	Texas Tech	#14 Stephen F. Austin W, 70–60	#6 Florida W, 69–66	#2 Purdue W, 78–65	#1 Villanova L, 59–71		
5	East	West Virginia	#12 Murray State W, 85–68	#13 Marshall W, 94–71	#1 Villanova L, 78–90			
6	Midwest	TCU	#11 Syracuse L, 52–57					
9	South	Kansas State	#8 Creighton W, 69–59	#16 UMBC W, 50–43	#5 Kentucky W, 61–58	#11 Loyola–Chicago L, 62–78		
10	South	Texas	#7 Nevada L, 83–87^{OT}					
10	Midwest	Oklahoma	#7 Rhode Island L, 78–83^{OT}					
	7 Bids	W-L (%):	4–3 .571	4–0 1.000	3–1 .750	1–2 .333	0–1 .000	TOTAL: 12–7 .632

=== NIT ===
Seed	Region	School	First Round	Second Round	Quarterfinals	Semifinals	Final
1	Baylor	Baylor	#8 Wagner W, 80–59	#4 Mississippi State L, 77–78			
2	USC	Oklahoma State	#7 Florida Gulf Coast W, 80–68	#3 Stanford W, 71–65	#4 Western Kentucky L, 84–92		
	2 Bids	W-L (%):	2–0 1.000	1–1 .500	0–1 .000	0–0 –	TOTAL: 3–2 .600

== Honors and awards ==
=== All-Americans ===
Consensus All-Americans
First Team	Second Team
Devonte' Graham, G, Kansas; Trae Young, G, Oklahoma	Jevon Carter, G, West Virginia; Keenan Evans, G, Texas Tech

To earn "consensus" status, a player must win honors from a majority of the following teams: the Associated Press, the USBWA, Sporting News, and the National Association of Basketball Coaches.

=== All-Big 12 awards and teams ===
2018 Big 12 Men's Basketball Individual Awards
Award	Recipient(s)
Player of the Year	Devonte' Graham†, G, Kansas
Coach of the Year	Chris Beard, Texas Tech; Bill Self, Kansas
Defensive Player of the Year	Jevon Carter, G, West Virginia
Sixth Man Award	Terry Maston, F, Baylor
Newcomer of the Year	Malik Newman, G, Kansas
Freshman of the Year	Trae Young, G, Oklahoma

2018 Big 12 Men's Basketball All-Conference Teams
First Team	Second Team	Third Team	Defensive Team
Jevon Carter†, G, West Virginia; Keenan Evans†, G, Texas Tech; Devonte' Graham†, G, Kansas; Dean Wade, F, Kansas State; Trae Young, G, Oklahoma	Mohamed Bamba, F, Texas; Barry Brown Jr., G, Kansas State; Manu Lecomte, G, Baylor; Sviatoslav Mykhailiuk, G, Kansas; Kenrich Williams, F, TCU	Jo Lual-Acuil, C, Baylor; Udoka Azubuike, C, Kansas; Vladimir Brodziansky, F, TCU; Jeffrey Carroll, G, Oklahoma State; Sagaba Konate, F, West Virginia	Mohamed Bamba†, F, Texas; Barry Brown Jr., G, Kansas State; Jevon Carter†, G, West Virginia; Sagaba Konate, F, West Virginia; Zhaire Smith, G, Texas Tech
† - denotes unanimous selection

=== Phillips 66 Player of the Week ===
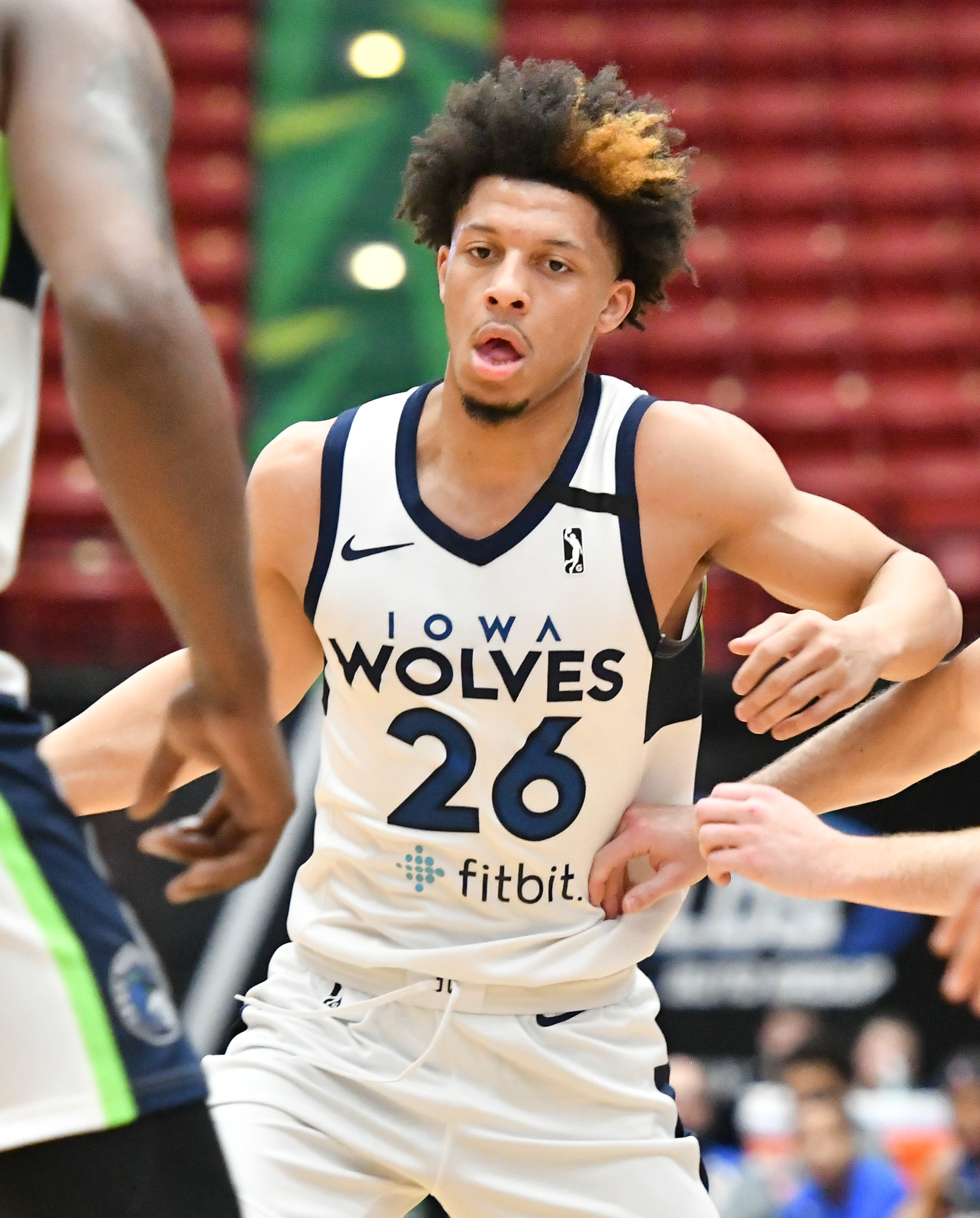
Lindell Wigginton

Week	Player of the Week	School	Newcomer of the Week	School	Ref.
Nov 13	Trae Young	Oklahoma	Mo Bamba; Marcus Garrett	Texas; Kansas	
Nov 20	Nick Weiler-Babb	Iowa State	Trae Young	Oklahoma	
Nov 27	Trae Young (2)	Oklahoma	Jarrett Culver	Texas Tech	
Dec 4	Devonte' Graham	Kansas	Trae Young (2)	Oklahoma	
Dec 11	Keenan Evans	Texas Tech	Lindell Wigginton	Iowa State	
Dec 18	Trae Young (3)	Oklahoma	Brady Manek	Oklahoma	
Dec 27	Trae Young (4)	Oklahoma	Brady Manek (2)	Oklahoma	
Jan 1	Trae Young (5)	Oklahoma	Mo Bamba (2)	Texas	
Jan 8	Keenan Evans (2)	Texas Tech	Teddy Allen	West Virginia	
Jan 15	Trae Young (6)	Oklahoma	Lindell Wigginton (2)	Iowa State	
Jan 22	Dean Wade	Kansas State	Cameron Lard; Malik Newman	Iowa State; Kansas	
Jan 29	Keenan Evans (3)	Texas Tech	Mo Bamba (3)	Texas	
Feb 5	Keenan Evans (4)	Texas Tech	Kendall Smith	Oklahoma State	
Feb 12	Manu Lecomte	Baylor	Cameron Lard (2)	Iowa State	
Feb 19	Terry Maston	Baylor	Mo Bamba (4)	Texas	
Feb 26	Devonte' Graham (2)	Kansas	Malik Newman (2); Lindell Wigginton (3)	Kansas; Iowa State	
Mar 5	Kendall Smith	Oklahoma State	Jericho Sims	Texas	

== See also ==
- 2017–18 NCAA Division I men's basketball season
- Big 12 Conference
- Big 12 Conference men's basketball
- Big 12/SEC Challenge
