= 2017–18 Oklahoma State Cowboys basketball team =

American college basketball season

2017–18 Oklahoma State Cowboys basketball

NIT, Quarterfinals
- Conference: Big 12 Conference
- Record: 21–15 (8–10 Big 12)
- Head coach: Mike Boynton Jr. (1st season)
- Assistant coaches: Scott Sutton; John Cooper; David Kontaxis
- Home arena: Gallagher-Iba Arena

2017–18 Big 12 men's basketball standings
| | Conf. | | | | Overall |
| Team | W | | L | PCT | W | | L | PCT |
|---|---|---|---|---|---|---|---|---|
| No. 4 Kansas † | 13 | – | 5 | .722 | 31 | – | 8 | .795 |
| No. 14 Texas Tech | 11 | – | 7 | .611 | 27 | – | 10 | .730 |
| No. 15 West Virginia | 11 | – | 7 | .611 | 26 | – | 11 | .703 |
| Kansas State | 10 | – | 8 | .556 | 25 | – | 12 | .676 |
| TCU | 9 | – | 9 | .500 | 21 | – | 12 | .636 |
| Baylor | 8 | – | 10 | .444 | 19 | – | 15 | .559 |
| Texas | 8 | – | 10 | .444 | 19 | – | 15 | .559 |
| Oklahoma State | 8 | – | 10 | .444 | 21 | – | 15 | .583 |
| Oklahoma | 8 | – | 10 | .444 | 18 | – | 14 | .563 |
| Iowa State | 4 | – | 14 | .222 | 13 | – | 18 | .419 |
† 2018 Big 12 Tournament winner Rankings from AP poll

The 2017–18 Oklahoma State Cowboys basketball team represented Oklahoma State University in the 2017–18 NCAA Division I men's basketball season. They were led by first-head coach Mike Boynton Jr. The Cowboys were members of the Big 12 Conference and played their home games at Gallagher-Iba Arena in Stillwater, Oklahoma. They finished the season 21–15, 8–10 in Big 12 play to finish in a four-way tie for sixth place. They defeated Oklahoma in the first round of the Big 12 tournament before losing in the quarterfinals to Kansas. They were invited to the National Invitation Tournament where they defeated Florida Gulf Coast and Stanford before losing in the quarterfinals to Western Kentucky.

== Previous season ==
The Cowboys finished the 2016–17 season with 20–13, 9–9 in Big 12 play to finish in fifth place. They lost to Iowa State in the quarterfinals of the Big 12 tournament. They received an at-large bid to the NCAA tournament as the No. 10 seed in the Midwest region where they lost to Michigan in the first round.

On March 18, 2017, head coach Brad Underwood left the school to accept the head coaching position at Illinois after one year at OSU. The school promoted assistant coach Mike Boynton Jr. to head coach on March 24.

== FBI investigation ==
On September 26, federal prosecutors in New York announced charges of fraud and corruption against 10 people involved in college basketball, including Oklahoma State assistant coach Lamont Evans. The charges allege that Evans and others allegedly received benefits from financial advisers and others to influence student-athletes to retain their services. Following the news, Evans was suspended and relieved of all duties. Evans was sentenced to three months in prison in June 2019 for his participation in the scheme, which he also conducted at the University of South Carolina.

In June 2020, a press release by the NCAA announced that the men’s basketball team will be prohibited from participating in 2020-21 postseason competition and the university will self-impose a fine of $10,000 plus 1 percent of the men’s basketball program’s budget.

== Departures ==
| Name | Number | Pos. | Height | Weight | Year | Hometown | Notes |
|---|---|---|---|---|---|---|---|
| Jawun Evans | 1 | G | 6'1" | 185 | Sophomore | Dallas, TX | Declared for 2017 NBA draft. Drafted by Philadelphia 76ers and traded to Los Angeles Clippers. |
| Phil Forte III | 13 | G | 5'11" | 195 | RS Senior | Flower Mound, TX | Graduated |
| Leyton Hammonds | 23 | F | 6'8" | 215 | Senior | North Richland Hills, TX | Graduated, signed a pro team in Finland. |
| Tyler Underwood | 32 | G | 6'2" | 240 | RS Freshman | Stillwater, OK | Transferred to Illinois. |
| Will Lienhard | 34 | F | 6'7" | 255 | Sophomore | Oklahoma City, OK | Walk-on, Transferred to Oklahoma Christian |

=== Incoming transfers ===
| Name | Number | Pos. | Height | Weight | Year | Hometown | Notes |
|---|---|---|---|---|---|---|---|
| Kendall Smith | 1 | G | 6'3" | 190 | RS Senior | Antioch, CA | Transferred from Cal State Northridge. Will be eligible to play immediately since Smith graduated from Cal State Northridge. |
| Michael Weathers | 23 | G | 6'2" | 170 | Sophomore | Roeland Park, KS | Transferred from Miami (OH). Will redshirt the 2017-18 season due to NCAA transfer rules. |
| Yankuba Sima | 35 | F/C | 6'11" | 225 | RS Junior | Girona, Spain | Transferred from St. John's. Will be eligible to play immediately for one year. |

== Recruits ==
College recruiting information
| Name | Hometown | School | Height | Weight | Commit date |
|---|---|---|---|---|---|
| Zack Dawson; G | Miami, FL | South Miami High School | 6 ft 3 in (1.91 m) | 185 lb (84 kg) | Jun 15, 2016 |
| Zack Dawson; G | Recruit ratings: Scout: Rivals: 247Sports: ESPN: (84) | | | | |
Overall recruit ranking:
Note: In many cases, Scout, Rivals, 247Sports, On3, and ESPN may conflict in their listings of height and weight.; In these cases, the average was taken. ESPN grades are on a 100-point scale.; Sources: "2017 Team Ranking". Rivals.

== Future recruits ==
=== 2018-19 team recruits ===
College recruiting information (2018)
| Name | Hometown | School | Height | Weight | Commit date |
|---|---|---|---|---|---|
| Duncan Demuth; PF | Seminole, FL | Seminole HS | 6 ft 8 in (2.03 m) | 215 lb (98 kg) | Oct 22, 2017 |
| Duncan Demuth; PF | Recruit ratings: Scout: Rivals: 247Sports: ESPN: | | | | |
| Yor Anei; PF | Lenexa, KS | Lee's Summit West HS | 6 ft 9 in (2.06 m) | 205 lb (93 kg) | Oct 26, 2017 |
| Yor Anei; PF | Recruit ratings: Scout: Rivals: 247Sports: ESPN: | | | | |
Overall recruit ranking:
Note: In many cases, Scout, Rivals, 247Sports, On3, and ESPN may conflict in their listings of height and weight.; In these cases, the average was taken. ESPN grades are on a 100-point scale.; Sources: "2018 Team Ranking". Rivals.

== Roster ==
2017–18 Oklahoma State Cowboys men's basketball team
Players
Coaches

| Pos. | # | Name | Height | Weight | Year | Previous school | Hometown |
|---|---|---|---|---|---|---|---|
| G | 0 | Brandon Averette | 5 ft 11 in (1.8 m) | 185 lb (84 kg) | So | Richardson | Richardson, TX |
| G | 1 | Kendall Smith | 6 ft 3 in (1.91 m) | 190 lb (86 kg) | RS Sr | Deer Valley HS; CSUN | Antioch, CA |
| G | 2 | Zach Dawson | 6 ft 3 in (1.91 m) | 185 lb (84 kg) | Fr | South Miami | Miami, FL |
| G | 4 | Thomas Dziagwa | 6 ft 4 in (1.93 m) | 180 lb (82 kg) | So | Tampa Catholic | Tampa, FL |
| G/F | 5 | Tavarius Shine | 6 ft 6 in (1.98 m) | 200 lb (91 kg) | RS Jr | MacArthur; FUMA | Irving, TX |
| F | 12 | Cameron McGriff | 6 ft 7 in (2.01 m) | 220 lb (100 kg) | So | South Grand Prairie | Grand Prairie, TX |
| F/C | 14 | Lucas N'Guessan | 7 ft 0 in (2.13 m) | 220 lb (100 kg) | So | Canarias Basketball Academy | De Lier, Netherlands |
| G | 21 | Lindy Waters III | 6 ft 6 in (1.98 m) | 205 lb (93 kg) | So | Norman North | Norman, OK |
| G | 23 | Michael Weathers (redshirt) | 6 ft 2 in (1.88 m) | 170 lb (77 kg) | So | Shawnee Mission North; Miami (OH) | Roeland Park, KS |
| G/F | 24 | Davon Dillard | 6 ft 5 in (1.96 m) | 215 lb (98 kg) | Jr | Our Savior New American School | Gary, IN |
| G/F | 30 | Jeffrey Carroll | 6 ft 6 in (1.98 m) | 220 lb (100 kg) | RS Sr | Rowlett | Rowlett, TX |
| F | 33 | Trey Reeves (W) | 6 ft 4 in (1.93 m) | 215 lb (98 kg) | So | Muldrow | Gans, OK |
| F/C | 35 | Yankuba Sima | 6 ft 11 in (2.11 m) | 225 lb (102 kg) | RS Jr | Elev8 Institute; St. John's | Girona, Spain |
| F | 41 | Mitchell Solomon | 6 ft 9 in (2.06 m) | 250 lb (113 kg) | Sr | Bixby | Bixby, OK |

Head coach

- Mike Boynton, Jr. (South Carolina)

Assistant coach(es)

- Scott Sutton (Oklahoma State)
- John Cooper (Wichita State)
- David Kontaxis (South Florida)

Legend

- (C) Team captain
- (S) Suspended
- (I) Ineligible
- (W) Walk-on
- Injured
- Current redshirt

Roster

== Schedule and results ==
| Date time, TV | Rank^{#} | Opponent^{#} | Result | Record | Site (attendance) city, state |
Exhibition
| Nov 3, 2017*; 7:00 pm, FSOK+ | | Arkansas–Monticello | W 85–65 | | Gallagher-Iba Arena (4,204); Stillwater, OK |
Regular season
| Nov 10, 2017*; 7:30 pm, FCS | | Pepperdine; Legends Classic regional game | W 78–47 | 1–0 | Gallagher-Iba Arena (5,386); Stillwater, OK |
| Nov 13, 2017*; 7:00 pm, FSOK+ | | Charlotte | W 83–65 | 2–0 | Gallagher-Iba Arena (4,387); Stillwater, OK |
| Nov 16, 2017*; 7:00 pm, FSOK+ | | Oral Roberts; Legends Classic regional game | W 91–48 | 3–0 | Gallagher-Iba Arena (4,268); Stillwater, OK |
| Nov 20, 2017*; 6:00 pm, ESPN2 | | vs. No. 16 Texas A&M; Legends Classic semifinals | L 55–72 | 3–1 | Barclays Center (5,904); Brooklyn, NY |
| Nov 21, 2017*; 2:30 pm, ESPNU | | vs. Pittsburgh; Legends Classic Consolation Game | W 73–67 | 4–1 | Barclays Center (5,081); Brooklyn, NY |
| Nov 26, 2017*; 2:00 pm, FSOK | | Houston Baptist | W 101–74 | 5–1 | Gallagher-Iba Arena (4,325); Stillwater, OK |
| Nov 29, 2017*; 7:00 pm, FSOK+ | | Austin Peay | W 79-63 | 6-1 | Gallagher-Iba Arena (4,697); Stillwater, OK |
| Dec 3, 2017*; 2:00 pm, FSOK+ | | Mississippi Valley State | W 83–62 | 7–1 | Gallagher-Iba Arena (4,564); Stillwater, OK |
| Dec 9, 2017*; 3:00 pm, ESPN2 | | No. 6 Wichita State | L 66–78 | 7–2 | Gallagher-Iba Arena (9,655); Stillwater, OK |
| Dec 16, 2017*; 1:00 pm, FS2 | | vs. No. 19 Florida State; Orange Bowl Basketball Classic | W 71–70 | 8–2 | BB&T Center (9,152); Sunrise, FL |
| Dec 19, 2017*; 8:00 pm, FSOK | | Tulsa | W 71–59 | 9–2 | Gallagher-Iba Arena (5,412); Stillwater, OK |
| Dec 22, 2017*; 12:00 pm, FSOK | | Texas–Rio Grande Valley | W 102–83 | 10–2 | Gallagher-Iba Arena (5,287); Stillwater, OK |
| Dec 29, 2017; 6:00 pm, ESPNU | | No. 7 West Virginia | L 79–85 | 10–3 (0–1) | Gallagher-Iba Arena (8,257); Stillwater, OK |
| Jan 3, 2018; 8:00 pm, ESPNU | | at No. 7 Oklahoma; Bedlam Series | L 89–109 | 10–4 (0–2) | Lloyd Noble Center (11,390); Norman, OK |
| Jan 6, 2018; 3:00 pm, ESPNU | | Iowa State | W 96–87 ^{OT} | 11–4 (1–2) | Gallagher-Iba Arena (5,568); Stillwater, OK |
| Jan 10, 2018; 7:00 pm, ESPNews | | at Kansas State | L 82–86 | 11–5 (1–3) | Bramlage Coliseum (7,470); Manhattan, KS |
| Jan 13, 2018; 4:00 pm, ESPNews | | Texas | W 65–64 | 12–5 (2–3) | Gallagher-Iba Arena (6,707); Stillwater, OK |
| Jan 15, 2018; 8:00 pm, ESPNU | | at Baylor | L 60–76 | 12–6 (2–4) | Ferrell Center (6,078); Waco, TX |
| Jan 20, 2018; 1:00 pm, ESPN | | No. 4 Oklahoma; Bedlam Series | W 83–81 ^{OT} | 13–6 (3–4) | Gallagher-Iba Arena (13,611); Stillwater, OK |
| Jan 23, 2018; 6:00 pm, ESPNews | | at No. 14 Texas Tech | L 70–75 | 13–7 (3–5) | United Supermarkets Arena (12,585); Lubbock, TX |
| Jan 27, 2018*; 5:00 pm, ESPN2 | | at Arkansas; Big 12/SEC Challenge | L 65–66 | 13–8 | Bud Walton Arena (18,057); Fayetteville, AR |
| Jan 30, 2018; 6:00 pm, ESPNU | | TCU | L 66–79 | 13–9 (3–6) | Gallagher-Iba Arena (6,250); Stillwater, OK |
| Feb 3, 2018; 11:00 am, CBS | | at No. 7 Kansas | W 84–79 | 14–9 (4–6) | Allen Fieldhouse (16,300); Lawrence, KS |
| Feb 6, 2018; 7:00 pm, ESPNU | | Baylor | L 56–67 | 14–10 (4–7) | Gallagher-Iba Arena (6,017); Stillwater, OK |
| Feb 10, 2018; 11:00 am, ESPN | | at No. 19 West Virginia | W 88–85 | 15–10 (5–7) | WVU Coliseum (13,057); Morgantown, WV |
| Feb 14, 2018; 6:00 pm, ESPNU | | Kansas State | L 72–82 | 15–11 (5–8) | Gallagher-Iba Arena (7,017); Stillwater, OK |
| Feb 17, 2018; 7:00 pm, ESPN2 | | at TCU | L 70–90 | 15–12 (5–9) | Schollmaier Arena (6,588); Fort Worth, TX |
| Feb 21, 2018; 6:00 pm, ESPNU | | No. 6 Texas Tech | W 79–71 | 16–12 (6–9) | Gallagher-Iba Arena (7,092); Stillwater, OK |
| Feb 24, 2018; 1:00 pm, LHN | | at Texas | L 64-65 | 16-13 (6-10) | Frank Erwin Center (12,316); Austin, TX |
| Feb 27, 2018; 6:00 pm, ESPNU | | at Iowa State | W 80–71 | 17–13 (7–10) | Hilton Coliseum (14,258); Ames, IA |
| Mar 3, 2018; 3:00 pm, ESPN2 | | No. 6 Kansas | W 82–64 | 18–13 (8–10) | Gallagher-Iba Arena (12,482); Stillwater, OK |
Big 12 tournament
| Mar 7, 2018; 6:00 pm, ESPNU | (8) | vs. (9) Oklahoma; First Round | W 71–60 | 19–13 | Sprint Center (17,752); Kansas City, MO |
| Mar 8, 2018; 1:30 pm, ESPN2 | (8) | vs. (1) No. 9 Kansas; Quarterfinals | L 68–82 | 19–14 | Sprint Center (17,903); Kansas City, MO |
NIT
| Mar 13, 2018*; 8:00 pm, ESPN2 | (2) | (7) Florida Gulf Coast; First Round – USC Bracket | W 80–68 | 20–14 | Gallagher-Iba Arena (5,305); Stillwater, OK |
| Mar 19, 2018*; 6:00 pm, ESPNU | (2) | (3) Stanford; Second Round – USC Bracket | W 71–65 | 21–14 | Gallagher-Iba Arena (9,635); Stillwater, OK |
| Mar 21, 2018*; 7:00 pm, ESPN | (2) | (4) Western Kentucky; Quarterfinals – USC Bracket | L 84–92 | 21–15 | Gallagher-Iba Arena (11,308); Stillwater, OK |
*Non-conference game. ^{#}Rankings from AP Poll. (#) Tournament seedings in parentheses. All times are in Central Time.
