= 2018 Big 12 men's basketball tournament =

- Classification: Division I
- Season: 2017–18
- Teams: 10
- Site: Sprint Center; Kansas City, Missouri
- Champions: Kansas (11th, later vacated title)
- Winning coach: Bill Self (8th title)
- MVP: Malik Newman (Kansas)
- Attendance: 89,249 (overall); 17,718 (championship)
- Top scorer: Malik Newman (Kansas) (72 points)
- Television: ESPN, ESPN2, ESPNU

2017–18 Big 12 men's basketball standings
	Conf.				Overall
Team	W		L	PCT	W		L	PCT
No. 4 Kansas †	13	–	5	.722	31	–	8	.795
No. 14 Texas Tech	11	–	7	.611	27	–	10	.730
No. 15 West Virginia	11	–	7	.611	26	–	11	.703
Kansas State	10	–	8	.556	25	–	12	.676
TCU	9	–	9	.500	21	–	12	.636
Baylor	8	–	10	.444	19	–	15	.559
Texas	8	–	10	.444	19	–	15	.559
Oklahoma State	8	–	10	.444	21	–	15	.583
Oklahoma	8	–	10	.444	18	–	14	.563
Iowa State	4	–	14	.222	13	–	18	.419
† 2018 Big 12 Tournament winner Rankings from AP poll

The 2018 Phillips 66 Big 12 men's basketball tournament was a postseason men's basketball tournament for the Big 12 Conference. It was played from March 7 to 10, in Kansas City, Missouri at the Sprint Center. Kansas defeated West Virginia in the championship game to win the tournament and receive the conference's automatic bid to the NCAA tournament. The Jayhawks tournament win was later vacated by the NCAA due to recruiting violations.

== Seeding ==
The Tournament consisted of a 10 team single-elimination tournament with the top 6 seeds receiving a bye. Teams were seeded by record within the conference, with a tiebreaker system to seed teams with identical conference records. These are the tiebreakers (5–8 involve both ties with two teams and ties with multiple teams):

1. If two teams have an identical conference record, then the team with the better head-to-head record gets the higher seed
2. If a tie can't be broken by the tiebreaker above, then the team with the better record against the 1 seed gets the higher seed
3. If those records are the same, then the team with the better road record against the top seed gets the higher seed
4. If multiple teams are tied, and you can't use the 1st tiebreaker, then the team with the better head-to-head record against the other tied teams gets the higher seed.
5. If tiebreaker number 4 can't break the tie between multiple teams, then the team with the better record against the 1 seed gets the higher seed
6. If those records are the same, the team with the better road record gets the higher seed
7. If those records are the same, the team with the better road record against the top seed gets the higher seed
8. If those records are the same, a public draw will be held to determine the top seed

2018 Big 12 Men's Basketball Tournament seeds
Seed	School	Conf.	Over.	Tiebreaker
1	Kansas ‡#	13–5	31–8	
2	Texas Tech #	11–7	27–10	1–1 vs WVU, 1–1 vs Kansas
3	West Virginia #	11–7	26–11	1–1 vs TTU, 0–2 vs Kansas
4	Kansas State #	10–8	25–12	
5	TCU #	9–9	21–12	
6	Baylor #	8–10	19–15	5–1 vs Okla/Okla St/Texas
7	Texas	8–10	19–15	3–3 vs Baylor/Okla/Okla St
8	Oklahoma State	8–10	21–15	2–4 vs Baylor/Okla/Texas, 2–0 vs KU
9	Oklahoma	8–10	18–14	2–4 vs Baylor/Okla St/Texas, 1–1 vs KU
10	Iowa State	4–14	13–18	
‡ – Big 12 Conference regular season champions, and tournament No. 1 seed. # – Received a single-bye in the conference tournament. Overall records include all games played in the Big 12 Conference tournament.

== Schedule ==
Session	Game	Time	Matchup	Television	Attendance
First Round – Wednesday, March 7
1	1	6:00 pm	#8 Oklahoma State 71 vs #9 Oklahoma 60	ESPNU	17,752
1	2	8:00 pm	#7 Texas 68 vs #10 Iowa State 64	ESPNU	17,752
Quarterfinals – Thursday, March 8
2	3	11:30 am	#4 Kansas State 66 vs #5 TCU 64 ^{OT}	ESPN2	17,903
2	4	1:30 pm	#1 Kansas 82 vs #8 Oklahoma State 68	ESPN2	17,903
3	5	6:00 pm	#2 Texas Tech 73 vs #7 Texas 69	ESPN2	17,653
3	6	8:00 pm	#3 West Virginia 78 vs #6 Baylor 65	ESPN2	17,653
Semifinals – Friday, March 9
4	7	6:00 pm	#1 Kansas 83 vs #4 Kansas State 67	ESPN	18,223
4	8	8:00 pm	#3 West Virginia 66 vs #2 Texas Tech 63	ESPN2	18,223
Final – Saturday, March 10
5	9	5:00 pm	#1 Kansas 81 vs #3 West Virginia 70	ESPN	17,718
Game times in CT. #-Rankings denote tournament seed

== Bracket ==
First round Wednesday, March 7 ESPNU
8	Oklahoma State	71
9	Oklahoma	60
7	Texas	68
10	Iowa State	64

Quarterfinals; Thursday, March 8 ESPN2
1	Kansas	82
8	Oklahoma State	68
4	Kansas State	66*
5	TCU	64
2	Texas Tech	73
7	Texas	69
3	West Virginia	78
6	Baylor	65

Semifinals; Friday, March 9 ESPN2
1	Kansas	83
4	Kansas State	67
2	Texas Tech	63
3	West Virginia	66

Championship; Saturday, March 10; ESPN
1	Kansas	81
3	West Virginia	70

* Indicates overtime game

== All-Tournament Team ==
Most Outstanding Player – Malik Newman, Kansas

Player	Team	Position	Class
Malik Newman	Kansas	So.	G
Devonte’ Graham	Kansas	Sr.	G
Jevon Carter	West Virginia	Sr.	G
Daxter Miles Jr.	West Virginia	Sr.	G
Makol Mawien	Kansas State	So.	G

== See also ==
- 2018 Big 12 Conference women's basketball tournament
- 2018 NCAA Division I men's basketball tournament
- 2017–18 NCAA Division I men's basketball rankings
