= 2017–18 TCU Horned Frogs men's basketball team =

American college basketball season

2017–18 TCU Horned Frogs men's basketball

Emerald Coast Classic champions

NCAA tournament, First Round
- Conference: Big 12 Conference
- Record: 21–12 (9–9 Big 12)
- Head coach: Jamie Dixon (2nd season)
- Assistant coaches: David Patrick; Ryan Miller (2nd season); Corey Barker
- Home arena: Schollmaier Arena

2017–18 Big 12 men's basketball standings
	Conf.				Overall
Team	W		L	PCT	W		L	PCT
No. 4 Kansas †	13	–	5	.722	31	–	8	.795
No. 14 Texas Tech	11	–	7	.611	27	–	10	.730
No. 15 West Virginia	11	–	7	.611	26	–	11	.703
Kansas State	10	–	8	.556	25	–	12	.676
TCU	9	–	9	.500	21	–	12	.636
Baylor	8	–	10	.444	19	–	15	.559
Texas	8	–	10	.444	19	–	15	.559
Oklahoma State	8	–	10	.444	21	–	15	.583
Oklahoma	8	–	10	.444	18	–	14	.563
Iowa State	4	–	14	.222	13	–	18	.419
† 2018 Big 12 Tournament winner Rankings from AP poll

The 2017–18 TCU Horned Frogs men's basketball team represented Texas Christian University in the 2017–18 NCAA Division I men's basketball season, led by head coach Jamie Dixon in his second season at TCU. The Horned Frogs competed as members of the Big 12 Conference and played their home games at Schollmaier Arena in Fort Worth, Texas. They finished the season 21–12, 9–9 in Big 12 play to finish in fifth place. They lost in the quarterfinals of the Big 12 tournament to Kansas State. They received an at-large bid to the NCAA tournament, their first appearance in 20 years. Seeded No. 6 in the Midwest region, TCU lost in the first round to Syracuse.

== Previous season ==
In 2016, the Horned Frogs introduced Jamie Dixon, a former TCU letterman, as the new head men's basketball coach. In his first season after leaving Pitt for his alma mater, Dixon led the Frogs to a 24–15, 6–12 Big 12 record. The Frogs' 6–12 record and eighth-place finish was their best league mark since joining the Big 12 in 2012. In the postseason, TCU defeated Oklahoma and No. 1 Kansas in the Big 12 tournament before losing in their first-ever Big 12 semifinal berth to Iowa State. They received an invitation to the National Invitation Tournament where they defeated Fresno State, Iowa, and Richmond to advance to the semifinals at Madison Square Garden. At MSG, they defeated UCF to advance to the NIT finals where they routed Georgia Tech to claim the 2017 NIT championship.

== Preseason ==
=== Departures ===
Name	Number	Pos.	Height	Weight	Year	Hometown	Reason
Michael Williams	2	G	6'2"	190	Senior	Arlington, TX	Graduated
Josh Parrish	5	G	6'5"	220	Freshman	Arlington, TX	Transferred to Rice
Brandon Parrish	11	F	6'6"	210	Senior	Arlington, TX	Graduated
Karviar Shephard	32	C	6'11"	230	Senior	Dallas, TX	Graduated
Chris Washburn	33	F	6'8"	240	Senior	Grand Prairie, TX	Graduated

=== Recruiting ===
College recruiting information
Name	Hometown	School	Height	Weight	Commit date
Kevin Samuel; C	Houston, TX	St. Thomas Episcopal	6 ft 10 in (2.08 m)	220 lb (100 kg)	Aug 16, 2016
Kevin Samuel; C	Recruit ratings: Scout: Rivals: 247Sports: ESPN:				
RJ Nembhard; G	Keller, TX	Keller High School	6 ft 4 in (1.93 m)	175 lb (79 kg)	Jul 14, 2016
RJ Nembhard; G	Recruit ratings: Scout: Rivals: 247Sports: ESPN:				
Lat Mayen; F	Adelaide, Australia	Concordia College	6 ft 8 in (2.03 m)	195 lb (88 kg)	Nov 1, 2016
Lat Mayen; F	Recruit ratings: Scout: Rivals: 247Sports: ESPN:				
Shawn Olden; G	Tulsa, OK	Union High School	6 ft 3 in (1.91 m)	180 lb (82 kg)	Mar 17, 2017
Shawn Olden; G	Recruit ratings: Scout: Rivals: 247Sports: ESPN:				
Ahmed Hamdy; F	Alexandria, Egypt		6 ft 9 in (2.06 m)	240 lb (110 kg)	
Ahmed Hamdy; F	Recruit ratings: Scout: Rivals: 247Sports: ESPN:				
Overall recruit ranking: Scout: NR Rivals: NR ESPN: NR
Note: In many cases, Scout, Rivals, 247Sports, On3, and ESPN may conflict in their listings of height and weight.; In these cases, the average was taken. ESPN grades are on a 100-point scale.; Sources: "TCU 2017 Basketball Commitments". Rivals.; "2017 TCU Basketball Commits". Scout.; "ESPN". ESPN.; "Scout.com Team Recruiting Rankings". Scout.; "2017 Team Ranking". Rivals.

=== Exhibition games in Australia ===
The Frogs traveled to Sydney and Melbourne, Australia, from August 5–16, 2017, and played five exhibition games under International Basketball Federation (FIBA) rules. TCU's starting sophomore guard Jaylen Fisher missed the trip due to a knee injury, and incoming freshmen Lat Mayen, an Australia native, and Kevin Samuel were unable to travel pending NCAA eligibility clearance. All three players were expected to be healthy and cleared prior to the season opener on November 10; however, the Frogs ultimately elected to redshirt Mayen and Samuel. The Horned Frogs defeated the Savannah Pride 108–54, Australia's Centre of Excellence 105–71, the Melbourne All-Stars 96–70, the Australia Longhorns 107–81, and the Knox Raiders 107–63.

=== Season projections ===
The Big 12 Conference coaches picked the Horned Frogs to finish third in regular season league play in the preseason coaches' poll, the highest-ever projection for the Frogs since joining the league in 2012 and being picked to finish ninth or tenth in each of their first five seasons. At Big 12 Media Day in Kansas City, Kansas head coach Bill Self suggested TCU would compete with the Jayhawks for the regular season crown. Senior Vladimir Brodziansky was one of five Big 12 players selected to the Preseason All-Big 12 team, and represents TCU's first selection since joining the league.

TCU received votes in the preseason Associated Press Poll and USA Today Coaches Poll, equivalent to 29th and 30th place, respectively.

== Roster ==
2017–18 TCU Horned Frogs men's basketball team
Players
Coaches

Pos.	#	Name	Height	Weight	Year	Previous school	Hometown
G	0	Jaylen Fisher (injured)	6 ft 2 in (1.88 m)	200 lb (91 kg)	So	Bolton	Arlington, TN
G	1	Desmond Bane	6 ft 5 in (1.96 m)	215 lb (98 kg)	So	Seton Catholic	Richmond, IN
G	2	Shawn Olden	6 ft 3 in (1.91 m)	180 lb (82 kg)	Jr	Union; New Mexico JC	Tulsa, OK
F	10	Vladimír Brodziansky	6 ft 11 in (2.11 m)	230 lb (104 kg)	Sr	Canarias Basketball Academy; Pratt CC	Prievidza, Slovakia
F	12	Kouat Noi	6 ft 7 in (2.01 m)	210 lb (95 kg)	RS Fr	Montverde Academy (FL)	Newcastle, Australia
F	13	Lat Mayen (redshirt)	6 ft 8 in (2.03 m)	195 lb (88 kg)	Fr	Basketball Australia's Centre of Excellence	Adelaide, Australia
F/C	14	Angus McWilliam (redshirt)	6 ft 10 in (2.08 m)	220 lb (100 kg)	Fr	Middleton Grange	Christchurch, New Zealand
F	15	JD Miller	6 ft 8 in (2.03 m)	235 lb (107 kg)	Jr	Seagoville	Dallas, TX
G	20	Dalton Dry (W)	6 ft 4 in (1.93 m)	190 lb (86 kg)	Sr	Country Day	Fort Worth, TX
C	21	Kevin Samuel (redshirt)	6 ft 11 in (2.11 m)	265 lb (120 kg)	Fr	Redemption Christian	Houston, TX
G	22	RJ Nembhard	6 ft 4 in (1.93 m)	190 lb (86 kg)	Fr	Keller HS	Keller, TX
F	23	Ahmed Hamdy	6 ft 9 in (2.06 m)	235 lb (107 kg)	Sr	Trent Internationale; VCU	Alexandria, Egypt
G	25	Alex Robinson	6 ft 1 in (1.85 m)	175 lb (79 kg)	Jr	Timberview; Texas A&M	Arlington, TX
F	33	Clayton Crawford (W)	6 ft 3 in (1.91 m)	210 lb (95 kg)	Sr	Aspen	Aspen, CO
G	34	Kenrich Williams	6 ft 7 in (2.01 m)	210 lb (95 kg)	Sr	University; New Mexico JC	Waco, TX
F	45	Austin Sottile (W)	6 ft 6 in (1.98 m)	225 lb (102 kg)	Sr	St. Louis University HS	St. Louis, MO

Head coach

- Jamie Dixon (TCU)

Assistant coach(es)

- David Patrick, Assistant Head Coach (Louisiana)
- Ryan Miller, Assistant Coach (Northern State)
- Corey Barker (Prairie View A&M)
- Ontario Lett, Special Assistant to the Head Coach (Pittsburgh)
- Thomas Montigel, Operations Coordinator (TCU)
- Ryan Brown, Graduate Assistant
- Mike Lecak, Graduate Assistant
- Corey Santee, Graduate Assistant
- Stephen Gephardt, Assistant Strength Coach
- Matt Herrill, Associate Director of Sports Medicine

Legend

- (C) Team captain
- (S) Suspended
- (I) Ineligible
- (W) Walk-on
- Injured
- Current redshirt

Roster
Last update: November 9, 2017

== Schedule and results ==
Date time, TV	Rank^{#}	Opponent^{#}	Result	Record	Site (attendance) city, state
Exhibition
August 8, 2017*; 5:00 am		at Savannah Pride	W 108–54; Box Score	–	Kevin Betts Stadium (N/A); Sydney, Australia
August 10, 2017*; 5:00 am		at Basketball Center of Excellence	W 105–71; Box Score	–	Minto Indoor Sports Centre (162); Sydney, Australia
August 12, 2017*; 2:30 am		at Melbourne All Stars	W 96–70; Box Score	–	Waverley Stadium (N/A); Melbourne, Australia
August 12, 2017*; 11:00 pm		at Longhorns	W 107–81; Box Score	–	Eagle Stadium (N/A); Melbourne, Australia
August 15, 2017*; 5:00 am		at Knox Raiders (Big V)	W 107–63; Box Score	–	State Basketball Centre (360); Melbourne, Australia
Regular season
November 10, 2017*; 8:00 pm, FCS		Louisiana–Monroe	W 83–73; Box Score	1–0	Schollmaier Arena (6,715); Fort Worth, TX
November 13, 2017*; 8:00 pm, FSSW+		Tennessee Tech; Emerald Coast Classic campus-site game	W 100–63; Box Score	2–0	Schollmaier Arena (6,019); Fort Worth, TX
November 15, 2017*; 8:00 pm, FSSW		South Dakota	W 76–71; Box Score	3–0	Schollmaier Arena (5,939); Fort Worth, TX
November 20, 2017*; 8:00 pm, FSSW+		Omaha; Emerald Coast Classic campus-site game	W 99–66; Box Score	4–0	Schollmaier Arena (6,733); Fort Worth, TX
November 24, 2017*; 6:00 pm, CBSSN		vs. New Mexico; Emerald Coast Classic semifinal	W 69–67; Box Score	5–0	The Arena at NFSC (1,000); Niceville, FL
November 25, 2017*; 6:00 pm, CBSSN		vs. St. Bonaventure; Emerald Coast Classic final	W 89–79; Box Score	6–0	The Arena at NFSC (1,400); Niceville, FL
November 29, 2017*; 8:00 pm, FSSW+	No. 23	Belmont	W 87–76; Box Score	7–0	Schollmaier Arena (6,237); Fort Worth, TX
December 2, 2017*; 7:00 pm, FSSW	No. 23	Yale	W 92–66; Box Score	8–0	Schollmaier Arena (5,970); Fort Worth, TX
December 5, 2017*; 8:00 pm, FSSW+	No. 20	SMU	W 94–83; Box Score	9–0	Schollmaier Arena (6,840); Fort Worth, TX
December 8, 2017*; 11:59 pm, ESPNU	No. 20	vs. No. 22 Nevada; Basketball Hall of Fame Classic	W 84–80; Box Score	10–0	Staples Center (6,456); Los Angeles, CA
December 18, 2017*; 8:00 pm, FSSW+	No. 15	Texas Southern	W 91–72; Box Score	11–0	Schollmaier Arena (5,925); Fort Worth, TX
December 22, 2017*; 8:00 pm, Facebook	No. 15	William & Mary	W 86–75; Box Score	12–0	Schollmaier Arena (6,207); Fort Worth, TX
December 30, 2017; 1:00 pm, ESPN2	No. 10	No. 12 Oklahoma	L 89–90; Box Score	12–1 (0–1)	Schollmaier Arena (6,912); Fort Worth, TX
January 2, 2018; 6:00 pm, ESPNews	No. 16	at Baylor	W 81–78; Box Score ^{OT}	13–1 (1–1)	Ferrell Center (5,776); Waco, TX
January 6, 2018; 8:15 pm, ESPN2	No. 16	No. 10 Kansas	L 84–88; Box Score	13–2 (1–2)	Schollmaier Arena (6,894); Fort Worth, TX
January 10, 2018; 8:00 pm, ESPNU	No. 16	at Texas	L 98–99; Box Score ^{2OT}	13–3 (1–3)	Frank Erwin Center (9,736); Austin, TX
January 13, 2018; 12:00 pm, ESPNU	No. 16	at No. 9 Oklahoma	L 97–102; Box Score ^{OT}	13–4 (1–4)	Lloyd Noble Center (11,504); Norman, OK
January 17, 2018; 8:00 pm, ESPNU	No. 24	Iowa State	W 96–73; Box Score	14–4 (2–4)	Schollmaier Arena (6,894); Fort Worth, TX
January 20, 2018; 3:00 pm, ESPNU	No. 24	at Kansas State	L 68–73; Box Score	14–5 (2–5)	Bramlage Coliseum (11,194); Manhattan, KS
January 22, 2018; 8:00 pm, ESPN		No. 7 West Virginia	W 82–73; Box Score	15–5 (3–5)	Schollmaier Arena (7,368); Fort Worth, TX
January 27, 2018*; 3:00 pm, ESPN2		at Vanderbilt; Big 12/SEC Challenge	L 78–81; Box Score	15–6	Memorial Gymnasium (9,755); Nashville, TN
January 30, 2018; 6:00 pm, ESPNU		at Oklahoma State	W 79–66; Box Score	16–6 (4–5)	Gallagher-Iba Arena (6,250); Stillwater, OK
February 3, 2018; 1:00 pm, ESPNU		No. 10 Texas Tech	L 71–83; Box Score	16–7 (4–6)	Schollmaier Arena (7,178); Fort Worth, TX
February 6, 2018; 8:00 pm, ESPN2		at No. 10 Kansas	L 64–71; Box Score	16–8 (4–7)	Allen Fieldhouse (16,300); Lawrence, KS
February 10, 2018; 1:00 pm, ESPNU		Texas	W 87–71; Box Score	17–8 (5–7)	Schollmaier Arena (6,549); Fort Worth, TX
February 12, 2018; 8:00 pm, ESPN2		at No. 20 West Virginia	L 66–82; Box Score	17–9 (5–8)	WVU Coliseum (11,773); Morgantown, WV
February 17, 2018; 7:00 pm, ESPN2		Oklahoma State	W 90–70; Box Score	18–9 (6–8)	Schollmaier Arena (6,588); Fort Worth, TX
February 21, 2018; 7:00 pm, Cyclones.TV		at Iowa State	W 89–83; Box Score	19–9 (7–8)	Hilton Coliseum (14,063); Ames, IA
February 24, 2018; 11:00 am, ESPN2		Baylor	W 82–72; Box Score	20–9 (8–8)	Schollmaier Arena (6,451); Fort Worth, TX
February 27, 2018; 8:00 pm, ESPNU		Kansas State	W 66–59; Box Score	21–9 (9–8)	Schollmaier Arena (6,682); Fort Worth, TX
March 3, 2018; 3:00 pm, ESPN2		at No. 12 Texas Tech	L 75–79; Box Score	21–10 (9–9)	United Supermarkets Arena (15,098); Lubbock, TX
Big 12 Tournament
March 16, 2018; 11:30 am, ESPN2	(5)	vs. (4) Kansas State; Quarterfinals	L 64–66; Box Score ^{OT}	21–11	Sprint Center (17,903); Kansas City, MO
NCAA tournament
March 16, 2018*; 9:40 pm, CBS	(6 MW)	vs. (11 MW) Syracuse; First Round	L 52–57; Box Score	21–12	Little Caesars Arena (20,314); Detroit, MI
*Non-conference game. ^{#}Rankings from AP Poll. (#) Tournament seedings in parentheses. All times are in Central Time.

Schedule Source: GoFrogs.com

== Rankings ==
TCU received votes in the preseason polls after their 2017 NIT Championship season. On December 25, 2017, the Horned Frogs received the program's first top-10 ranking from the Associated Press poll, surpassed the following day by a top-8 ranking from the USA Today Coaches Poll.

Ranking movements Legend: ██ Increase in ranking ██ Decrease in ranking — = Not ranked RV = Received votes
	Week																				
Poll	Pre	1	2	3	4	5	6	7	8	9	10	11	12	13	14	15	16	17	18	19	Final
AP	RV	RV	RV	23	20	14	15	10	16	16	24	RV	RV	RV	RV	RV	RV	RV	RV	RV	—
Coaches	RV	RV^	RV	RV	20	14	12	8	15	16	25	RV	RV	—	RV	RV	RV	RV	RV	RV	—

^Coaches Poll did not release a Week 2 poll at the same time AP did.
*AP does not release post-NCAA tournament rankings.

== Future players ==
=== Signing class entering 2018-19 ===
College recruiting information (2018)
Name	Hometown	School	Height	Weight	Commit date
Kendric Davis; PG	Houston, TX	Sam Houston High School	5 ft 11 in (1.80 m)	165 lb (75 kg)	Jun 16, 2016
Kendric Davis; PG	Recruit ratings: Scout: Rivals: 247Sports: ESPN:				
Russell Barlow; C	Richardson, TX	Berkner High School	6 ft 7 in (2.01 m)	215 lb (98 kg)	Aug 3, 2017
Russell Barlow; C	Recruit ratings: Scout: Rivals: 247Sports: ESPN:				
Kaden Archie; SF	Midlothian, TX	Midlothian High School	6 ft 6 in (1.98 m)	200 lb (91 kg)	Oct 15, 2017
Kaden Archie; SF	Recruit ratings: Scout: Rivals: 247Sports: ESPN:				
Angus McWilliam; C	Christchurch City, NZ	Middleton Grange School	6 ft 11 in (2.11 m)	235 lb (107 kg)	Apr 19, 2017
Angus McWilliam; C	Recruit ratings: Rivals:				
Yuat Alok; F	Auckland, NZ, Marianna, FL	Impact Academy, Chipola College	6 ft 11 in (2.11 m)	215 lb (98 kg)	Jan 28, 2018
Yuat Alok; F	Recruit ratings: Rivals:				
Overall recruit ranking:
Note: In many cases, Scout, Rivals, 247Sports, On3, and ESPN may conflict in their listings of height and weight.; In these cases, the average was taken. ESPN grades are on a 100-point scale.; Sources: "2018 TCU Commits". Rivals.; "2018 Team Ranking". Rivals.
