= 2017–18 Oklahoma Sooners men's basketball team =

American college basketball season

2017–18 Oklahoma Sooners men's basketball

NCAA tournament, First Round
- Conference: Big 12 Conference
- Record: 18–14 (8–10 Big 12)
- Head coach: Lon Kruger (7th season)
- Assistant coaches: Chris Crutchfield; Carlin Hartman; Kevin Kruger
- Home arena: Lloyd Noble Center

2017–18 Big 12 men's basketball standings
	Conf.				Overall
Team	W		L	PCT	W		L	PCT
No. 4 Kansas †	13	–	5	.722	31	–	8	.795
No. 14 Texas Tech	11	–	7	.611	27	–	10	.730
No. 15 West Virginia	11	–	7	.611	26	–	11	.703
Kansas State	10	–	8	.556	25	–	12	.676
TCU	9	–	9	.500	21	–	12	.636
Baylor	8	–	10	.444	19	–	15	.559
Texas	8	–	10	.444	19	–	15	.559
Oklahoma State	8	–	10	.444	21	–	15	.583
Oklahoma	8	–	10	.444	18	–	14	.563
Iowa State	4	–	14	.222	13	–	18	.419
† 2018 Big 12 Tournament winner Rankings from AP poll

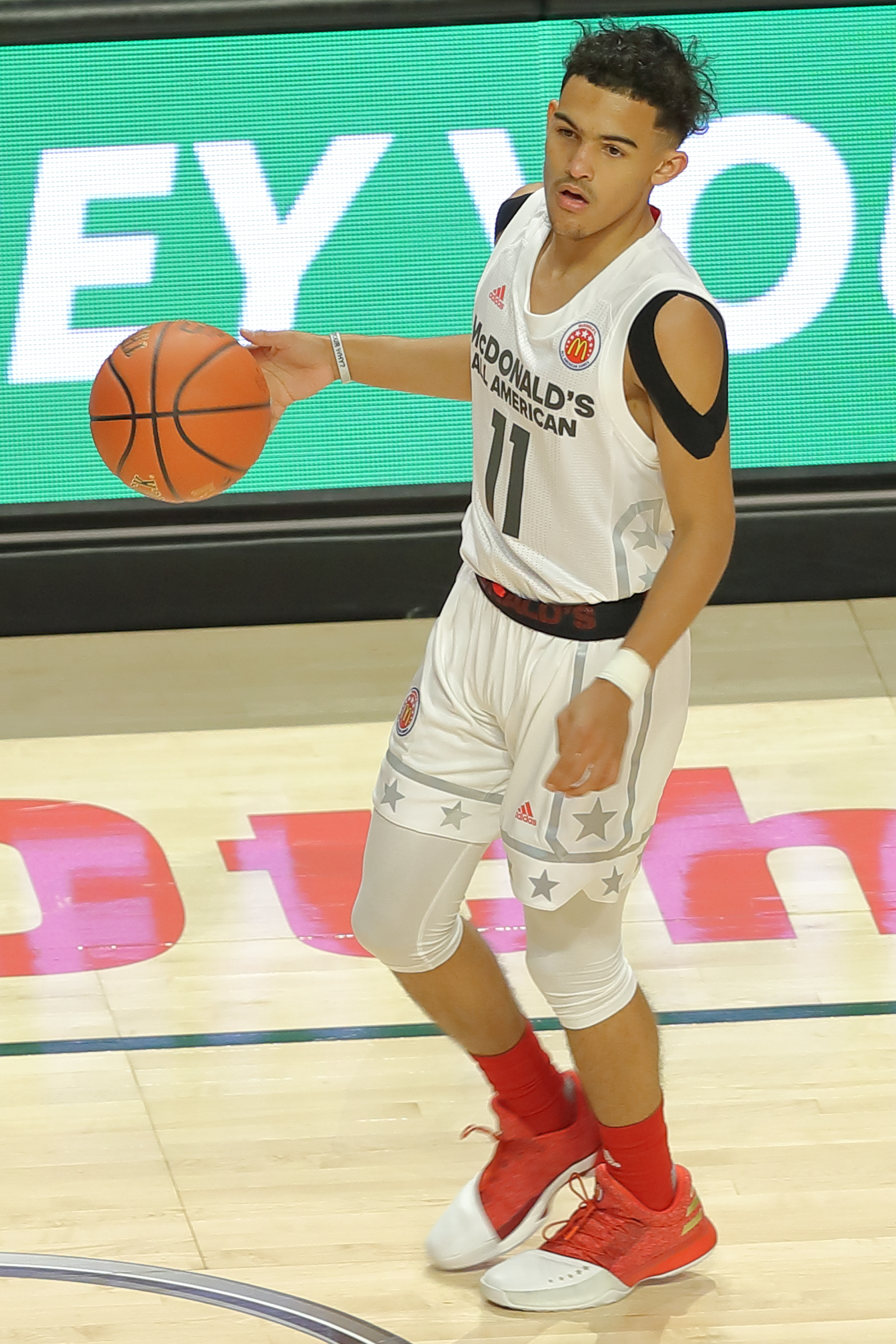
Oklahoma recruit Trae Young at the 2017 McDonald's All-American Boys Game.

The 2017–18 Oklahoma Sooners basketball team represented the University of Oklahoma in the 2017–18 NCAA Division I men's basketball season. They were led by seventh-year head coach Lon Kruger and played their home games at the Lloyd Noble Center in Norman, Oklahoma as a member of the Big 12 Conference. They finished the season 18–14, 8–10 in Big 12 play to finish in a tie for eighth place. They lost in the First Round of the Big 12 tournament to Oklahoma State. They received an at-large bid to the NCAA tournament where they lost in the First Round to Rhode Island.

== Previous season ==
The Sooners finished the 2016–17 season with an overall record of 11–20, 5–13 in Big 12 play to finish in ninth place. They lost in the first round of the Big 12 tournament to TCU.

== Offseason ==
=== Departures ===
Name	Number	Pos.	Height	Weight	Year	Hometown	Notes
Darrion Strong-Moore	00	F	6'1"	180	RS Senior	Chicago, IL	Transferred to Arkansas-Fort Smith
Jordan Woodard	10	G	6'0"	187	Senior	Arcadia, OK	Graduated
Grant Quinn	15	G	6'4"	185	Freshman	Argyle, TX	Walk-on; didn't return
Dante Buford	21	F	6'7"	221	RS Sophomore	Jacksonville, FL	Transferred to Texas–San Antonio
Daniel Harper	22	G	6'1"	190	RS Senior	Norman, OK	Walk-on; graduated
C.J. Cole	25	F	6'7"	245	RS Senior	Sperry, OK	Walk-on; graduated

=== Incoming transfers ===
Name	Number	Pos.	Height	Weight	Year	Hometown	Previous School
Ty Lazenby	14	G	6'2"	180	Junior	Glencoe, OK	Junior college transfer from Northern Oklahoma College.

=== 2017 recruiting class ===
College recruiting information
Name	Hometown	School	Height	Weight	Commit date
Trae Young #4 PG	Norman, OK	Norman North High School	6 ft 2 in (1.88 m)	180 lb (82 kg)	Feb 16, 2016
Trae Young #4 PG	Recruit ratings: Scout: Rivals: 247Sports: ESPN: (93)				
Brady Manek #30 PF	Harrah, OK	Harrah High School	6 ft 9 in (2.06 m)	235 lb (107 kg)	Oct 22, 2015
Brady Manek #30 PF	Recruit ratings: Scout: Rivals: 247Sports: ESPN: (81)				
Hannes Pöllä; C	Lahti, Finland	Helsinki Basketball Academy (FI)	6 ft 11 in (2.11 m)	265 lb (120 kg)	Sep 8, 2016
Hannes Pöllä; C	Recruit ratings: Scout: Rivals: 247Sports: ESPN: (80)				
Overall recruit ranking:
Note: In many cases, Scout, Rivals, 247Sports, On3, and ESPN may conflict in their listings of height and weight.; In these cases, the average was taken. ESPN grades are on a 100-point scale.; Sources: "Oklahoma 2017 Basketball Commitments". Rivals.; "2017 Oklahoma Basketball Commits". Scout.; "ESPN". ESPN.; "Scout.com Team Recruiting Rankings". Scout.; "2017 Team Ranking". Rivals.

== Future recruits ==
=== 2018–19 team recruits ===
College recruiting information (2018)
Name	Hometown	School	Height	Weight	Commit date
Jamal Bieniemy; SG	Katy, TX	Tompkins High School	6 ft 3 in (1.91 m)	170 lb (77 kg)	May 7, 2017
Jamal Bieniemy; SG	Recruit ratings: Scout: Rivals: 247Sports: ESPN:				
Overall recruit ranking:
Note: In many cases, Scout, Rivals, 247Sports, On3, and ESPN may conflict in their listings of height and weight.; In these cases, the average was taken. ESPN grades are on a 100-point scale.; Sources: "2018 Team Ranking". Rivals.

== Roster ==
2017–18 Oklahoma Sooners men's basketball team
Players
Coaches

Pos.	#	Name	Height	Weight	Year	Previous school	Hometown
G	0	Christian James	6 ft 4 in (1.93 m)	218 lb (99 kg)	Jr	Bellaire	Houston, TX
F	1	Rashard Odomes	6 ft 6 in (1.98 m)	212 lb (96 kg)	Jr	Copperas Cove	Copperas Cove, TX
G	2	Chris Giles (W)	6 ft 3 in (1.91 m)	193 lb (88 kg)	Fr	Findlay Prep	Dallas, TX
F	3	Khadeem Lattin	6 ft 9 in (2.06 m)	212 lb (96 kg)	Sr	Redemption Christian Homeschool Academy	Houston, TX
C	4	Jamuni McNeace	6 ft 10 in (2.08 m)	215 lb (98 kg)	RS Jr	Allen	Allen, TX
F	5	Matt Freeman	6 ft 10 in (2.08 m)	224 lb (102 kg)	RS So	Westlake Boys	Auckland, New Zealand
G	11	Trae Young	6 ft 2 in (1.88 m)	180 lb (82 kg)	Fr	Norman North	Norman, OK
G	13	Jordan Shepherd	6 ft 2 in (1.88 m)	180 lb (82 kg)	So	Asheville Christian	Asheville, NC
G	14	Ty Lazenby	6 ft 5 in (1.96 m)	210 lb (95 kg)	Jr	Northern Oklahoma College	Glencoe, OK
G	20	Kameron McGusty	6 ft 5 in (1.96 m)	191 lb (87 kg)	So	Sunrise Christian Academy	Katy, TX
F	21	Kristian Doolittle	6 ft 7 in (2.01 m)	236 lb (107 kg)	So	Edmond Memorial	Edmond, OK
F	22	Patrick Geha	6 ft 5 in (1.96 m)	200 lb (91 kg)	Jr	Rockhurst	Leawood, KS
F	30	Marshall Thrope (W)	6 ft 9 in (2.06 m)	235 lb (107 kg)	RS So	Bishop Kelley	Tulsa, OK
F	32	Read Streller (W)	6 ft 8 in (2.03 m)	220 lb (100 kg)	Fr	Oklahoma Christian	Edmond, OK
F	35	Brady Manek	6 ft 9 in (2.06 m)	215 lb (98 kg)	Fr	Harrah	Harrah, OK
C	44	Hannes Pöllä	6 ft 11 in (2.11 m)	265 lb (120 kg)	Fr	Helsinki Basketball Academy	Lahti, Finland

Head coach

- Lon Kruger (Kansas State)

Assistant coach(es)

- Chris Crutchfield (Omaha)
- Carlin Hartman (Tulane)
- Kevin Kruger (Arizona State)

Legend

- (C) Team captain
- (S) Suspended
- (I) Ineligible
- (W) Walk-on
- Injured
- Current redshirt

Roster

== Schedule and results ==
Date time, TV	Rank^{#}	Opponent^{#}	Result	Record	High points	High rebounds	High assists	Site (attendance) city, state
New Zealand and Australia Foreign Tour
Aug 6, 2017*; 3:00 pm, Facebook Live		vs. New Zealand Select	W 133–91	–	21 – Young	7 – Tied	11 – Shepherd	Auckland Grammar School; Auckland, New Zealand
Aug 9, 2017*; 7:30 pm, Facebook Live		at Sutherland Sharks (WL)	W 129–51	–	23 – Young	10 – Tied	9 – Tied	Sutherland Basketball Stadium; Sutherland, NSW, Australia
Aug 10, 2017*; 7:30 pm, YouTube		vs. Sydney Kings (NBL)	W 104–89	–	21 – Young	6 – Tied	6 – Young	Penrith Basketball Stadium; Penrith, NSW, Australia
Aug 13, 2017*; 4:00 pm, Facebook Live		vs. Cairns Taipans (NBL)	W 110–85	–	21 – Young	6 – Tied	6 – Young	Bendigo Bank Basketball Stadium; Bendigo, QLD, Australia
Exhibition
Oct 28, 2017*; 12:00 pm, SSTV		Texas–Arlington; Hurricane Relief Scrimmage	L 84–99	–	28 – James	9 – Manek	9 – Young	Lloyd Noble Center; Norman, OK
Nov 8, 2017*; 7:00 pm, SSTV/FSOK		East Central	W 114–78	–	23 – Young	10 – Lattin	6 – Young	Lloyd Noble Center; Norman, OK
Regular season
Nov 12, 2017*; 2:00 pm, SSTV/FSOK		Omaha	W 108–89	1–0	15 – Young	7 – Lattin	10 – Young	Lloyd Noble Center (5,573); Norman, OK
Nov 15, 2017*; 7:00 pm, SSTV/FSOK		Ball State; Phil Knight Invitational campus game	W 108–69	2–0	22 – Young	8 – Lattin	13 – Young	Lloyd Noble Center (7,242); Norman, OK
Nov 23, 2017*; 4:00 pm, ESPN2		vs. Arkansas; Phil Knight Invitational Victory Bracket quarterfinals	L 83–92	2–1	28 – Young	10 – Lattin	5 – Young	Moda Center (11,294); Portland, OR
Nov 24, 2017*; 5:00 pm, ESPN3		vs. Portland; Phil Knight Invitational Victory Bracket consolation 2nd round	W 93–71	3–1	33 – Young	16 – Lattin	8 – Young	Veterans Memorial Coliseum (6,603); Portland, OR
Nov 26, 2017*; 12:00 pm, ESPN2		vs. Oregon; Phil Knight Invitational Victory Bracket 5th place game	W 90–80	4–1	43 – Young	7 – James	7 – Young	Veterans Memorial Coliseum (5,910); Portland, OR
Nov 30, 2017*; 7:00 pm, SSTV/FSOK		North Texas	W 82–72	5–1	32 – Young	9 – Lattin	10 – Young	Lloyd Noble Center (8,132); Norman, OK
Dec 4, 2017*; 7:00 pm, SSTV/FSOK		UTSA	W 97–85	6–1	28 – Young	11 – Lattin	8 – Young	Lloyd Noble Center (8,793); Norman, OK
Dec 8, 2017*; 7:00 pm, ESPN2		vs. No. 25 USC; Basketball Hall of Fame Classic	W 85–83	7–1	29 – Young	6 – Lattin	9 – Young	Staples Center (6,456); Los Angeles, CA
Dec 16, 2017*; 4:00 pm, ESPN2		vs. No. 3 Wichita State; InTrust Bank Arena Showcase	W 91–83	8–1	29 – Young	10 – McNeace	10 – Young	Intrust Bank Arena (15,004); Wichita, KS
Dec 19, 2017*; 7:00 pm, SSTV/FSOK	No. 17	Northwestern State	W 105–68	9–1	26 – Young	7 – McNeace	22 – Young	Lloyd Noble Center (7,945); Norman, OK
Dec 22, 2017*; 6:00 pm, ESPN2	No. 17	Northwestern	W 104–78	10–1	31 – Young	8 – Manek	12 – Young	Lloyd Noble Center (11,259); Norman, OK
Dec 30, 2017; 1:00 pm, ESPNU	No. 12	at No. 10 TCU	W 90–89	11–1 (1–0)	39 – Young	13 – Manek	14 – Young	Schollmaier Arena (6,912); Fort Worth, TX
Jan 3, 2018; 8:00 pm, ESPNU	No. 7	Oklahoma State; Bedlam Series	W 109–89	12–1 (2–0)	28 – Manek	9 – Young	10 – Young	Lloyd Noble Center (11,390); Norman, OK
Jan 6, 2018; 6:15 pm, ESPN2	No. 7	at No. 6 West Virginia	L 76–89	12–2 (2–1)	29 – Young	8 – McNeace	5 – Young	WVU Coliseum (15,106); Morgantown, WV
Jan 9, 2018; 6:00 pm, ESPNU	No. 9	No. 8 Texas Tech	W 75–65	13–2 (3–1)	27 – Young	8 – Lattin	10 – Young	Lloyd Noble Center (10,043); Norman, OK
Jan 13, 2018; 12:00 pm, ESPNU	No. 9	No. 16 TCU	W 102–97 ^{OT}	14–2 (4–1)	43 – Young	11 – Young	7 – Young	Lloyd Noble Center (11,504); Norman, OK
Jan 16, 2018; 8:00 pm, ESPNU	No. 4	at Kansas State	L 69–87	14–3 (4–2)	20 – Young	7 – James	6 – Young	Bramlage Coliseum (10,744); Manhattan, KS
Jan 20, 2018; 1:00 pm, ESPN	No. 4	at Oklahoma State; Bedlam Series	L 81–83 ^{OT}	14–4 (4–3)	48 – Young	11 – Tied	8 – Young	Gallagher-Iba Arena (13,611); Stillwater, OK
Jan 23, 2018; 6:00 pm, ESPN2	No. 12	No. 5 Kansas	W 85–80	15–4 (5–3)	26 – Young	7 – Tied	9 – Young	Lloyd Noble Center (11,886); Norman, OK
Jan 27, 2018*; 2:15 pm, ESPN	No. 12	at Alabama; Big 12/SEC Challenge	L 73–80	15–5	18 – Lattin	9 – Manek	8 – Young	Coleman Coliseum (15,383); Tuscaloosa, AL
Jan 30, 2018; 8:00 pm, ESPN2	No. 12	Baylor	W 98–96	16–5 (6–3)	44 – Young	12 – Lattin	9 – Young	Lloyd Noble Center (10,574); Norman, OK
Feb 3, 2018; 5:15 pm, ESPN	No. 12	at Texas; College Gameday	L 74–79	16–6 (6–4)	19 – Young	7 – Tied	14 – Young	Frank Erwin Center (15,533); Austin, TX
Feb 5, 2018; 9:00 pm, ESPN	No. 17	No. 19 West Virginia	L 73–75	16–7 (6–5)	32 – Young	13 – Lattin	2 – Tied	Lloyd Noble Center (10,650); Norman, OK
Feb 10, 2018; 1:00 pm, ESPN	No. 17	at Iowa State	L 80–88	16–8 (6–6)	22 – Tied	9 – James	11 – Young	Hilton Coliseum (14,384); Ames, IA
Feb 13, 2018; 6:00 pm, ESPN	No. 23	at No. 7 Texas Tech	L 78–88	16–9 (6–7)	23 – James	9 – McNeace	7 – Young	United Supermarkets Arena (15,098); Lubbock, TX
Feb 17, 2018; 11:00 am, ESPN	No. 23	Texas	L 66–77	16–10 (6–8)	26 – Young	8 – McNeace	7 – Young	Lloyd Noble Center (11,645); Norman, OK
Feb 19, 2018; 8:00 pm, ESPN		at No. 8 Kansas	L 74–104	16–11 (6–9)	22 – McGusty	4 – Doolittle	9 – Young	Allen Fieldhouse (16,300); Lawrence, KS
Feb 24, 2018; 5:00 pm, ESPNU		Kansas State	W 86–77	17–11 (7–9)	28 – Young	8 – McNeace	7 – Young	Lloyd Noble Center (12,102); Norman, OK
Feb 27, 2018; 8:00 pm, ESPN2		at Baylor	L 64–87	17–12 (7–10)	18 – Young	6 – Doolittle	5 – Young	Ferrell Center (7,334); Waco, TX
Mar 2, 2018; 8:00 pm, ESPN2		Iowa State	W 81–60	18–12 (8–10)	18 – McGusty	10 – Doolittle	6 – Young	Lloyd Noble Center (11,589); Norman, OK
Big 12 Tournament
Mar 7, 2018; 6:00 pm, ESPNU	(9)	vs. (8) Oklahoma State; First Round	L 60–71	18–13	22 – Young	7 – McNeace	5 – Young	Sprint Center (17,752); Kansas City, MO
NCAA tournament
Mar 15, 2018*; 11:15 am, CBS	(10 MW)	vs. (7 MW) Rhode Island; First Round	L 78–83 ^{OT}	18–14	28 – Young	12 – Doolittle	7 – Young	PPG Paints Arena (18,757); Pittsburgh, PA
*Non-conference game. ^{#}Rankings from AP Poll. (#) Tournament seedings in parentheses. MW=Midwest. All times are in Central Time.

== Rankings ==
Ranking movements Legend: ██ Increase in ranking ██ Decrease in ranking — = Not ranked RV = Received votes
	Week																				
Poll	Pre	1	2	3	4	5	6	7	8	9	10	11	12	13	14	15	16	17	18	19	Final
AP	RV	RV	RV	RV	RV	RV	17	12	7	9	4	12	12	17	23	RV					Not released
Coaches	RV	RV	RV	RV	RV	24	17	12	7	9	6	11	15	18	23	RV					—
