= 2017–18 Baylor Bears basketball team =

American college basketball season

2017–18 Baylor Bears basketball

CBE Hall of Fame Classic champions

NIT, Second Round
- Conference: Big 12 Conference
- Record: 19–15 (8–10 Big 12)
- Head coach: Scott Drew (15th season)
- Associate head coach: Jerome Tang
- Assistant coaches: Alvin Brooks III; John Jakus
- Home arena: Ferrell Center

2017–18 Big 12 men's basketball standings
	Conf.				Overall
Team	W		L	PCT	W		L	PCT
No. 4 Kansas †	13	–	5	.722	31	–	8	.795
No. 14 Texas Tech	11	–	7	.611	27	–	10	.730
No. 15 West Virginia	11	–	7	.611	26	–	11	.703
Kansas State	10	–	8	.556	25	–	12	.676
TCU	9	–	9	.500	21	–	12	.636
Baylor	8	–	10	.444	19	–	15	.559
Texas	8	–	10	.444	19	–	15	.559
Oklahoma State	8	–	10	.444	21	–	15	.583
Oklahoma	8	–	10	.444	18	–	14	.563
Iowa State	4	–	14	.222	13	–	18	.419
† 2018 Big 12 Tournament winner Rankings from AP poll

The 2017–18 Baylor Bears basketball team represented Baylor University in the 2017–18 NCAA Division I men's basketball season. This was head coach Scott Drew's 15th season at Baylor. The Bears competed in the Big 12 Conference and played their home games at the Ferrell Center in Waco, TX. They finished the season 19–15 overall and 8–10 in Big 12 play, finishing in a four-way tie for sixth place. As the No. 6 seed in the Big 12 tournament, they were defeated by West Virginia in the quarterfinals. They were one of the last four teams not selected for the NCAA tournament and as a result earned a no. 1 seed in the National Invitation Tournament, where they defeated Wagner in the first round before losing to Mississippi State in the second round.

== Previous season ==
The Bears finished the 2016–17 season 27–8, 12–6 in Big 12 play to finish in a tie for second place. They lost to Kansas State in the quarterfinals of the Big 12 tournament. They received an at-large bid to the NCAA tournament as a No. 3 seed. They defeated No. 14 seeded New Mexico State and No. 11 seeded USC in the first and second rounds before losing to No. 7 seeded South Carolina in the sweet sixteen.

== Offseason ==
=== Departures ===
Name	Number	Pos.	Height	Weight	Year	Hometown	Reason for departure
Wendell Mitchell	1	G	6'3"	180	Freshman (RS)	Rockdale, TX	Transferred to Trinity Valley CC
Johnathan Motley	5	F	6'10"	230	Junior (RS)	Houston, TX	Entered 2017 NBA draft; Undrafted; Signed by the Dallas Mavericks
Ish Wainright	24	F	6'5"	235	Senior	Kansas City, MO	Graduated; Joined football team with remaining year of eligibility
Al Freeman	25	G	6'3"	200	Junior (RS)	Charlotte, NC	Graduated; Transferred to NC State

=== Incoming transfers ===
Name	Number	Pos.	Height	Weight	Year	Hometown	Previous School
Mario Kegler	4	F	6'7"	230	Sophomore	Jackson, MS	Transferred from Mississippi State. Under NCAA transfer rules, Kegler will have to sit out for the 2017–18 season. Will have three years of remaining eligibility.
Leonard Allen II	12	C	6'11"	200	Sophomore	Round Rock, TX	Junior college transferred from San Diego City College
Freddie Gillespie	45	F	6'9"	230	Junior	Saint Paul, MN	Transferred from Carleton. Under NCAA transfer rules, Gillespie will have to sit out for the 2017–18 season. Will have two years of remaining eligibility. Will join the team as a preferred walk-on.

=== 2017 recruiting class ===
College recruiting information
Name	Hometown	School	Height	Weight	Commit date
Tristan Clark #42 PF	San Antonio, TX	Karen Wagner High School	6 ft 8 in (2.03 m)	220 lb (100 kg)	Oct 16, 2015
Tristan Clark #42 PF	Recruit ratings: Scout: Rivals: 247Sports: ESPN:				
Overall recruit ranking:
Note: In many cases, Scout, Rivals, 247Sports, On3, and ESPN may conflict in their listings of height and weight.; In these cases, the average was taken. ESPN grades are on a 100-point scale.; Sources: "2017 Team Ranking". Rivals.

=== 2018 recruiting class ===
College recruiting information (2018)
Name	Hometown	School	Height	Weight	Commit date
Matthew Mayer #15 SF	Austin, TX	Westlake High School	6 ft 7 in (2.01 m)	200 lb (91 kg)	Jun 13, 2017
Matthew Mayer #15 SF	Recruit ratings: Scout: Rivals: 247Sports: ESPN:				
Flo Thamba #18 C	Grundy, VA	Mountain Mission School	6 ft 9 in (2.06 m)	224 lb (102 kg)	Jan 15, 2018
Flo Thamba #18 C	Recruit ratings: Scout: Rivals: 247Sports: ESPN:				
Overall recruit ranking:
Note: In many cases, Scout, Rivals, 247Sports, On3, and ESPN may conflict in their listings of height and weight.; In these cases, the average was taken. ESPN grades are on a 100-point scale.; Sources: "2018 Team Ranking". Rivals.

== Roster ==
2017–18 Baylor Bears men's basketball team
Players
Coaches

Pos.	#	Name	Height	Weight	Year	Previous school	Hometown
F	0	Jo Lual-Acuil	7 ft 0 in (2.13 m)	225 lb (102 kg)	RS Sr	Kingsway Christian College; Neosho County CC	Melbourne, Australia
G	3	Jake Lindsey	6 ft 5 in (1.96 m)	190 lb (86 kg)	Jr	Olympus	Salt Lake City, UT
F	4	Mario Kegler (redshirt)	6 ft 7 in (2.01 m)	230 lb (104 kg)	So	Oak Hill Academy; Mississippi State	Jackson, MS
G	10	Tyson Jolly	6 ft 4 in (1.93 m)	190 lb (86 kg)	RS Fr	Elev8 Basketball Academy	Oklahoma City, OK
F	11	Mark Vital	6 ft 5 in (1.96 m)	230 lb (104 kg)	So	Advanced Prep International	Lake Charles, LA
F	12	Leonard Allen	7 ft 0 in (2.13 m)	235 lb (107 kg)	So	Round Rock; San Diego CC	Round Rock, TX
G	20	Manu Lecomte	5 ft 11 in (1.8 m)	175 lb (79 kg)	RS Sr	Athénée des Pagodes; Miami (FL)	Brussels, Belgium
F	21	Nuni Omot	6 ft 9 in (2.06 m)	205 lb (93 kg)	Sr	Mahtomedi; Indian Hills CC	Mahtomedi, MN
G	22	King McClure	6 ft 3 in (1.91 m)	215 lb (98 kg)	Jr	Triple A Academy	Ovilla, TX
F	25	Tristan Clark	6 ft 9 in (2.06 m)	240 lb (109 kg)	Fr	Wagner	San Antonio, TX
F	30	Jonathan Davis	6 ft 6 in (1.98 m)	205 lb (93 kg)	Jr	Argyle	Argyle, TX
F	31	Terry Maston	6 ft 8 in (2.03 m)	225 lb (102 kg)	Sr	DeSoto	DeSoto, TX
G	34	Obim Okeke (W)	6 ft 0 in (1.83 m)	225 lb (102 kg)	So	Bishop Gorman	Las Vegas, NV
F	45	Freddie Gillespie (W) (redshirt)	6 ft 8 in (2.03 m)	240 lb (109 kg)	Jr	East Ridge; Carleton	St. Paul, MN

Head coach

- Scott Drew (Butler)

Assistant coach(es)

- Alvin Brooks III (Idaho State)
- John Jakus (Trinity International)
- Jerome Tang (Charter Oak)

Legend

- (C) Team captain
- (S) Suspended
- (I) Ineligible
- (W) Walk-on
- Injured
- Current redshirt

Roster

== Schedule and results ==
Date time, TV	Rank^{#}	Opponent^{#}	Result	Record	Site (attendance) city, state
Exhibition
Oct 21, 2017*; 12:00 pm		Houston; Hurricane Harvey Relief Exhibition	L 78–81		Ferrell Center (2,551); Waco, TX
Regular season
Nov 10, 2017*; 12:00 pm, FSSW	No. 24	Central Arkansas; Hall of Fame Classic campus-site game	W 107–66	1–0	Ferrell Center (7,791); Waco, TX
Nov 13, 2017*; 7:00 pm, FCS	No. 25	Texas A&M–Corpus Christi	W 70–46	2–0	Ferrell Center (4,454); Waco, TX
Nov 17, 2017*; 8:00 pm, FCS	No. 25	Alcorn State; Hall of Fame Classic campus-site game	W 78–61	3–0	Ferrell Center (5,330); Waco, TX
Nov 20, 2017*; 8:30 pm, ESPN2	No. 22	vs. Wisconsin; Hall of Fame Classic semifinals	W 70–65	4–0	Sprint Center (10,243); Kansas City, MO
Nov 21, 2017*; 9:00 pm, ESPN2	No. 22	vs. Creighton; Hall of Fame Classic championship	W 65–59	5–0	Sprint Center (10,160); Kansas City, MO
Nov 28, 2017*; 5:30 pm, FS1	No. 16	at No. 21 Xavier	L 63–76	5–1	Cintas Center (10,503); Cincinnati, OH
Dec. 2, 2017*; 1:00 pm, ESPNU	No. 16	No. 8 Wichita State	L 62–69	5–2	Ferrell Center (9,733); Waco, TX
Dec 4, 2017*; 7:00 pm, FSSW+	No. 23	Sam Houston State	W 84–56	6–2	Ferrell Center (5,015); Waco, TX
Dec 9, 2017*; 6:00 pm, FSSW+	No. 23	vs. Randall; Fort Hood Showcase	W 105–82	7–2	Abrams Gym (2,500); Fort Hood, TX
Dec 14, 2017*; 7:30 pm, ESPN2	No. 21	Texas Southern	W 99–68	8–2	Ferrell Center (5,459); Waco, TX
Dec 17, 2017*; 2:00 pm, FSSW	No. 21	Savannah State	W 118–86	9–2	Ferrell Center (6,996); Waco, TX
Dec 20, 2017*; 7:00 pm, FCS	No. 18-t	Southern	W 80–60	10–2	Ferrell Center (5,877); Waco, TX
Dec 29, 2017; 7:00 pm, FCS	No. 18	at No. 22 Texas Tech	L 53–77	10–3 (0–1)	United Supermarkets Arena (12,827); Lubbock, TX
Jan 2, 2018; 7:00 pm, ESPNews		No. 16 TCU	L 78–81	10–4 (0–2)	Ferrell Center (5,776); Waco, TX
Jan 6, 2018; 1:00 pm, ESPNU		Texas	W 69–60	11–4 (1–2)	Ferrell Center (7,119); Waco, TX
Jan 9, 2018; 6:00 pm, ESPN2		at No. 2 West Virginia	L 54–57	11–5 (1–3)	WVU Coliseum (12,551); Morgantown, WV
Jan 13, 2018; 2:00 pm, ESPNews		at Iowa State	L 65–75	11–6 (1–4)	Hilton Coliseum (14,283); Ames, IA
Jan 15, 2018; 8:00 pm, ESPNU		Oklahoma State	W 76–60	12–6 (2–4)	Ferrell Center (6,078); Waco, TX
Jan 20, 2018; 5:00 pm, ESPN		at No. 10 Kansas	L 67–70	12–7 (2–5)	Allen Fieldhouse (16,300); Lawrence, KS
Jan 22, 2018; 8:00 pm, ESPNU		Kansas State	L 83–90	12–8 (2–6)	Ferrell Center (4,787); Waco, TX
Jan 27, 2018*; 11:00 am, ESPN		at No. 20 Florida; Big 12/SEC Challenge	L 60–81	12–9	O'Connell Center (10,623); Gainesville, FL
Jan 30, 2018; 8:00 pm, ESPN2		at No. 12 Oklahoma	L 96–98	12–10 (2–7)	Lloyd Noble Center (10,574); Norman, OK
Feb 3, 2018; 7:00 pm, ESPN2		Iowa State	W 81–67	13–10 (3–7)	Ferrell Center (6,852); Waco, TX
Feb 6, 2018; 7:00 pm, ESPNU		at Oklahoma State	W 67–56	14–10 (4–7)	Gallagher-Iba Arena (6,017); Stillwater, OK
Feb 10, 2018; 1:00 pm, CBS		No. 10 Kansas	W 80–64	15–10 (5–7)	Ferrell Center (9,323); Waco, TX
Feb 12, 2018; 8:00 pm, ESPN		at Texas	W 74–73 ^{2OT}	16–10 (6–7)	Frank Erwin Center (9,204); Austin, TX
Feb 17, 2018; 6:30 pm, ESPNU		No. 7 Texas Tech	W 59–57	17–10 (7–7)	Ferrell Center (10,627); Waco, TX
Feb 20, 2018; 6:00 pm, ESPN2		No. 21 West Virginia	L 60–71	17–11 (7–8)	Ferrell Center (7,519); Waco, TX
Feb 24, 2018; 11:00 am, ESPN2		at TCU	L 72–82	17–12 (7–9)	Schollmaier Arena (6,451); Fort Worth, TX
Feb 27, 2018; 8:00 pm, ESPN2		Oklahoma	W 87–64	18–12 (8–9)	Ferrell Center (7,334); Waco, TX
Mar 3, 2018; 1:00 pm, ESPN		at Kansas State	L 67–77	18–13 (8–10)	Bramlage Coliseum (10,299); Manhattan, KS
Big 12 tournament
Mar 8, 2018; 8:00 pm, ESPNU	(6)	vs. (3) No. 18 West Virginia; Quarterfinals	L 65–78	18–14	Sprint Center (17,653); Kansas City, MO
NIT
Mar 13, 2018*; 6:00 pm, ESPN2	(1)	(8) Wagner; First Round – Baylor Bracket	W 80–58	19–14	Ferrell Center (1,988); Waco, TX
Mar 18, 2018*; 11:00 am, ESPN	(1)	(4) Mississippi State; Second Round – Baylor Bracket	L 77–78	19–15	Ferrell Center (2,246); Waco, TX
*Non-conference game. ^{#}Rankings from AP Poll. (#) Tournament seedings in parentheses. All times are in Central Time.

== Rankings ==
Ranking movements Legend: ██ Increase in ranking ██ Decrease in ranking — = Not ranked RV = Received votes
	Week																			
Poll	Pre	1	2	3	4	5	6	7	8	9	10	11	12	13	14	15	16	17	18	Final
AP	24	25	22	16	23	21	18	18	RV	RV	—	—	—	—	—	RV				Not released
Coaches	24	24	24	16	22	21	18	17	RV	RV	RV	—	—	—	—	RV				

*AP does not release post-NCAA tournament rankings
