= Puerto Rico Tip-Off =

Preseason college basketball tournament

- Puerto Rico Tip-Off
- Sport: College basketball
- Founded: 2007
- Founder: ESPN Regional Television
- Folded: 2017
- Replaced by: Myrtle Beach Invitational
- No. of teams: 8
- Country: United States
- Venues: HTC Center (2017); HP Field House (2016); Roberto Clemente Coliseum (2013–2015); Coliseo Rubén Rodríguez (2012); José Miguel Agrelot Coliseum (2007–2011)
- Last champion: Iowa State
- Most titles: Miami (FL) & Xavier (2)
- Broadcaster: ESPN
- Website: puertoricotipoff.com

The Puerto Rico Tip-Off was an early-season college basketball tournament owned and operated by ESPN Regional Television that took place in late November of each year from 2007 through 2017, usually the week before Thanksgiving.

== History ==
The Puerto Rico Tip-Off began in 2007. From 2007 to 2011, it was held in José Miguel Agrelot Coliseum in San Juan, Puerto Rico. In 2012, it took place in Coliseo Rubén Rodríguez in Bayamón, Puerto Rico. From 2013 to 2015, Roberto Clemente Coliseum in San Juan hosted it.

In 2016, plans to hold the tournament at Roberto Clemente Coliseum were scrapped due to a Zika virus outbreak in Puerto Rico, and it was held instead at HP Field House at Walt Disney World Resort in Orlando, Florida, temporarily renamed the Tire Pros Invitational for 2016. Plans called for the tournament to return to Puerto Rico in 2017 and take place at the Coliseo Tomás Dones in Fajardo, Puerto Rico, but widespread damage in Puerto Rico by Hurricane Maria in September 2017 caused the 2017 edition of the tournament to be moved as well, to the HTC Center on the campus of Coastal Carolina University in Conway, South Carolina.

The 2017 tournament was the final one for the Puerto Rico Tip-Off. Since 2018, the Myrtle Beach Invitational has taken place at the HTC Center instead.

== Champions ==
Year	School
2017	Iowa State
2016	Xavier
2015	Miami
2014	West Virginia
2013	Charlotte
2012	Oklahoma State
2011	Alabama
2010	Minnesota
2009	Villanova
2008	Xavier
2007	Miami

== 2017 Tournament ==
The 2017 field of eight teams to compete in the 2017 Puerto Rico Tip-Off was unveiled on July 26, 2017. Due to the aftermath of Hurricane Maria, the 2017 tournament took place at the HTC Center on the campus of Coastal Carolina University in Conway, South Carolina.

- All times Eastern.

=== Campus Site Games ===
Game 1 November 12; ESPN3		Game 2 November 13; SEC Network
		Western Michigan	60
Bridgewater	57	South Carolina	78
Appalachian State	95

=== Championship Round ===
First Round; November 16; ESPN2; ESPNU
Illinois State	69
South Carolina	65
Boise State	58
UTEP	56
Iowa State	104
Appalachian State	98
Tulsa	81
Western Michigan	74

Semifinals; November 17; ESPN2; ESPNU
Illinois State	64
Boise State	82
Iowa State	80
Tulsa	78

Championship; November 19; ESPN2
Boise State	64
Iowa State	75
3rd place game
November 19 (ESPNU)
Illinois State	84
Tulsa	68

Consolation 2nd Round; November 17; ESPNU
South Carolina	80
UTEP	56
Appalachian State	67
Western Michigan	86

5th place game November 19; ESPNU
South Carolina	79
Western Michigan	66

7th place game November 19; ESPNU
UTEP	72
Appalachian State	76

== 2016 Tournament (Tire Pros Invitational) ==
The 2016 tournament took place at HP Field House in Orlando, Florida due to a Zika virus outbreak in Puerto Rico, and temporarily was renamed the Tire Pros Invitational Tournament.

First Round; November 17
Clemson	95
Davidson	78
11	Xavier	83^{OT}
Missouri	82
Northern Iowa	82
Arizona State	63
Oklahoma	89
Tulane	70

Semifinals; November 18
Clemson	77
11	Xavier	83
Northern Iowa	73^{OT}
Oklahoma	67

Championship; November 20
11	Xavier	67
Northern Iowa	59

3rd place game November 20
Clemson	64
Oklahoma	70

Consolation 2nd Round; November 18
Davidson	70
Missouri	55
Arizona State	80
Tulane	71

5th place game November 20
Davidson	68
Arizona State	60

7th place game November 20
Missouri	67
Tulane	62

== 2015 Tournament ==
First Round; November 19
22	Butler	93
Missouri State	59
Minnesota	70
Temple	75
Mississippi State	79
Miami (FL)	105
Texas Tech	63
16	Utah	73

Semifinals; November 20
22	Butler	74
Temple	69
Miami (FL)	90
16	Utah	66

Championship; November 22
22	Butler	75
Miami (FL)	85

3rd place game November 22
	Temple	68
16	Utah	74

Consolation 2nd Round; November 20
Missouri State	69
Minnesota	74
Mississippi State	72
Texas Tech	74

5th place game November 22
Minnesota	68
Texas Tech	81

7th place game November 22
Missouri State	70
Mississippi State	84

== 2014 Tournament ==
First Round; Thursday, November 20
Texas A&M	53
Dayton	55
Charleston	57
17	Connecticut	65
New Mexico	65
Boston College	69
George Mason	65
West Virginia	91

Semifinals; Friday, November 21
Dayton	64
17	Connecticut	75
Boston College	66
West Virginia	70

Championship; Sunday, November 23
17	Connecticut	68
West Virginia	78

3rd Place Game; Sunday, November 23
Dayton	65
Boston College	53

Consolation 2nd Round; Friday, November 21
Texas A&M	59
Charleston	50
New Mexico	69
George Mason	58

5th Place Game; Sunday, November 23
Texas A&M	64
New Mexico	51

7th Place Game; Sunday, November 23
Charleston	61
George Mason	60

== 2013 Tournament ==
=== Campus Site Games ===
Game 1 November 17		Game 2 November 29
			Northeastern	66
Long Beach State	58	14	VCU	79
Kansas State	71

=== Championship Round ===
First Round; Thursday, November 21
Charlotte	68
Kansas State	61
Northeastern	63
Georgetown	56
Long Beach State	61
14	Michigan	85
Florida State	85
10	VCU	67

Semifinals; Friday, November 22
Charlotte	86
Northeastern	77
14	Michigan	82^{OT}
Florida State	80

Championship; Sunday, November 24
Charlotte	63
14	Michigan	61

3rd Place Game; Sunday, November 24
Northeastern	60
Florida State	62

Consolation 2nd Round; Friday, November 22
Kansas State	63
Georgetown	90
Long Beach State	67
10	VCU	73

5th Place Game; Sunday, November 24
Georgetown	84
10	VCU	80

7th Place Game; Sunday, November 24
Kansas State	52
Long Beach State	38

== 2012 Tournament ==
First Round; Thursday, November 15
Akron	65
Oklahoma State	69^{OT}
UNC Asheville	68
Tennessee	75
6	NC State	72
Penn State	55
Providence	75
UMass	77

Semifinals; Friday, November 16
Oklahoma State	62
Tennessee	45
6	NC State	94
UMass	76

Championship; Sunday, November 18
Oklahoma State	76
6	NC State	56

3rd Place Game; Sunday, November 18
Tennessee	83
UMass	69

Consolation 2nd Round; Friday, November 16
Akron	82
UNC Asheville	63
Penn State	55^{OT}
Providence	52

5th Place Game; Sunday, November 18
Akron	85
Penn State	60

7th Place Game; Sunday, November 18
UNC Asheville	67
Providence	72

All Times Eastern

== 2011 Tournament ==
- November 17–20

First Round
Temple	69
Western Michigan	55
Purdue	91
Iona	90
Maryland	42
16	Alabama	62
Wichita State	67
Colorado	58

Semifinals
Temple	77
Purdue	85
16	Alabama	70
Wichita State	60

Championship
Purdue	56
16	Alabama	65

3rd Place Game
Temple	78^{OT}
Wichita State	74

Consolation 2nd Round
Western Michigan	88
Iona	94
Maryland	78
Colorado	71

5th Place Game
Iona	89
Maryland	63

7th Place Game
Western Michigan	76
Colorado	81

== 2010 Tournament ==
- November 18–21

First Round
Davidson	70
West Virginia	84
Nebraska	49
Vanderbilt	59
Hofstra	63
8	North Carolina	107‡
Western Kentucky	77
Minnesota	95

Semifinals
West Virginia	74
Vanderbilt	71
8	North Carolina	67
Minnesota	72

Championship
Minnesota	74
West Virginia	70

3rd Place
	Vanderbilt	72
8	North Carolina	65

Consolation 2nd Round
Davidson	70
Nebraska	67
Hofstra	60
WKU	62

5th Place
Davidson	64
WKU	51

7th Place Game
Nebraska	62
Hofstra	47

‡ tournament record for most points scored in a game

== 2009 Tournament ==
- November 19–22

First Round
21	Dayton	63
19	Georgia Tech	59
6	Villanova	69
George Mason	68
Indiana	71
Ole Miss	89
Boston University	70
Kansas State	80

Semifinals
21	Dayton	65
6	Villanova	71
Ole Miss	86
Kansas State	74

Championship
6	Villanova	79
Ole Miss	67

3rd Place Game
21	Dayton	75
	Kansas State	83

Consolation 2nd Round
19	Georgia Tech	70
George Mason	62
Indiana	67
Boston University	71

5th Place Game
19	Georgia Tech	85
Boston University	67

7th Place Game
George Mason	69
Indiana	66

== 2008 Tournament ==
- November 20–23

First Round
Fairfield	57
Virginia Tech	74
Missouri	71
Xavier	75
Chattanooga	71
Memphis	83
USC	61
Seton Hall	63

Semifinals
Virginia Tech	62
Xavier	63
Memphis	84
Seton Hall	70

Championship
Xavier	63
Memphis	58

3rd Place Game
Virginia Tech	73
Seton Hall	77

Consolation 2nd Round
Fairfield	59
Missouri	87
Chattanooga	46
USC	73

5th Place Game
Missouri	83
USC	72

7th Place Game
Fairfield	61
Chattanooga	42

== 2007 Tournament ==
- November 15–18

First Round
Houston	72
VCU	73
Marist	61
Miami	85
Temple	64
Providence	66
College of Charleston	49
18	Arkansas	75

Semifinals
VCU	63
Miami	69
18	Arkansas	51
Providence	67

Championship
Miami	64
Providence	58

3rd Place Game
	VCU	60
18	Arkansas	70

Loser's Bracket
Houston	64
Marist	58
College of Charleston	79
Temple	76

Fifth Place Game
College of Charleston	69
Houston	84

7th Place Game
Marist	69
Temple	73
