= Hans Brase =

American-German basketball player

Personal information
- Born: September 15, 1993 (age 33) Charlottesville, Virginia
- Listed height: 6 ft 9 in (2.06 m)
- Listed weight: 229 lb (104 kg)

Career information
- High school: The Hill School (Pottstown, Pennsylvania)
- College: Princeton (2012–2017); Iowa State (2017–2018)
- NBA draft: 2018: undrafted
- Playing career: 2018–2021
- Position: Power forward / small forward
- Number: 30

Career history
- 2018–2019: Mitteldeutscher BC
- 2019–2020: Riesen Ludwigsburg
- 2020–2021: Hamburg Towers

Hans-George Brase (Hans) (born September 15, 1993) is a retired American-German basketball player. He stands 6’9’’ (205 cm) tall and plays the forward position. He made 52 appearances in the German Basketball-Bundesliga.

== Career ==
Born in Charlottesville, Virginia, Brase spent parts of his early childhood in Germany, where his parents come from, before his family settled in Clover, South Carolina.

Brase attended Gaston Day School in Gastonia, North Carolina and transferred to the Hill School in Pottstown, Pennsylvania in 2010.

He committed to Princeton University in 2011 and joined the Tigers for the 2012–13 season. During his freshman season, he received Ivy League Rookie of the Week honors on December 24, 2012. As a sophomore (2013–14), Brase led the team in rebounding (5.7rpg) and was the team's second-leading scorer with 11.2 points a contest. As a junior (2014–15), Brase once again led the Tigers in rebounding (7.5rpg) and was the team's second-leading scorer with 11.5 points a contest.

In November 2015, prior to his senior season, Brase sustained a torn ACL and missed the entire 2015–16 campaign. He suffered another injury to his right knee in December 2016, which ended his senior season as well as his playing career at Princeton. Brase played five games as a senior, averaging 6.4 points and 2.8 rebounds a contest. As the Ivy League does not allow medical redshirts, he transferred to Iowa State for a fifth year of college basketball.

In Mai 2018, he signed his first contract as a professional basketball player, inking a deal with Mitteldeutscher BC of the German Basketball Bundesliga. In his first season as professional basketball player, Brase averaged 5.2 points and 3.4 rebounds a game in 23 Bundesliga contests. In June 2019, he signed with fellow Bundesliga side Riesen Ludwigsburg. In the 2019–20 season, he reached the Bundesliga finals with Ludwigsburg, where he and his team fell short to Alba Berlin.

Brase signed with Bundesliga team Hamburg Towers on August 4, 2020.

== National team ==
Brase plays internationally for Germany. In 2013, he attended the under-20 European Championships in Estonia. During the summer of 2014, he played in friendly tournaments across Europe ultimately culminating in a six team tournament in China. He won silver at the 2015 World University Games in South Korea after losing to the Kansas Jayhawks, who were representing the United States, in the gold medal game. Brase led the team in scoring and rebounding as their only defeat in the tournament was to Kansas in double overtime.

== Personal info ==
Brase's sister Marie-Luise played basketball at Colgate University, his brother Janpeter was a member of the St. Lawrence University basketball team.
