= 2018–19 Big 12 Conference men's basketball season =

2018–19 Big 12 Men's Basketball Season
- League: NCAA Division I
- Sport: Basketball
- Teams: 10
- TV partner(s): CBS, ESPN, FSN

NBA Draft
- Top draft pick: Jarrett Culver
- Picked by: 6th, Minnesota Timberwolves

2018–19 NCAA Division I men's basketball season
- 2019 Big 12 Champions: Kansas State; Texas Tech
- Season MVP: Jarrett Culver, Texas Tech
- Top scorer: Dedric Lawson, Kansas

Big 12 tournament
- Champions: Iowa State
- Finals MVP: Marial Shayok

Big 12 Basketball seasons
- ← 2017–18 2019–20 →

2018–19 Big 12 men's basketball standings
	Conf.				Overall
Team	W		L	PCT	W		L	PCT
No. 19 Kansas State	14	–	4	.778	25	–	9	.735
No. 2 Texas Tech	14	–	4	.778	31	–	7	.816
No. 16 Kansas	12	–	6	.667	26	–	10	.722
Baylor	10	–	8	.556	20	–	14	.588
No. 25 Iowa State †	9	–	9	.500	23	–	12	.657
Texas	8	–	10	.444	21	–	16	.568
Oklahoma	7	–	11	.389	20	–	14	.588
TCU	7	–	11	.389	23	–	14	.622
Oklahoma State	5	–	13	.278	12	–	20	.375
West Virginia	4	–	14	.222	15	–	21	.417
† 2019 Big 12 tournament winner Rankings from AP Poll

The 2018–19 Big 12 men's basketball season began with practices in October 2018, followed by the start of the 2018–19 NCAA Division I men's basketball season in November. Regular season conference play began in December 2018 and concluded in March 2018. Kansas State and Texas Tech won a share of the regular season Big 12 Championship, ending the streak of 14 consecutive conference titles for Kansas.

The Big 12 tournament was held from March 13 through 16 at the Sprint Center in Kansas City, Missouri. Iowa State defeated Kansas in the Big 12 tournament championship game to receive the conference's automatic bid to the NCAA tournament.

Baylor, Iowa State, Kansas, Kansas State, Oklahoma, and Texas Tech each received invitations to the NCAA tournament. Texas Tech advanced to the NCAA championship game where they lost to Virginia.

== Coaches ==
=== Coaching changes ===
There were no head coaching changes following the 2017–18 Big 12 Conference men's basketball season.

=== Head coaches ===
Note: Stats are through the beginning of the season. All stats and records are from time at current school only.

Team	Head coach	Previous job	Seasons at school	Overall record	Big 12 record	NCAA tournaments	NCAA Final Fours	NCAA Championships
Baylor	Scott Drew	Valparaiso	15th	298–195 (.604)	115–137 (.456)	7	0	0
Iowa State	Steve Prohm	Murray State	4th	60–41 (.594)	26–28 (.481)	2	0	0
Kansas	Bill Self	Illinois	16th	447–96 (.823)	208–46 (.819)	15	3	1
Kansas State	Bruce Weber	Illinois	7th	125–80 (.610)	55–53 (.509)	4	0	0
Oklahoma	Lon Kruger	UNLV	8th	140–91 (.606)	65–61 (.516)	6	1	0
Oklahoma State	Mike Boynton	Oklahoma State (asst.)	2nd	21–15 (.583)	8–10 (.444)	0	0	0
TCU	Jamie Dixon	Pittsburgh	4th	45–27 (.625)	15–21 (.417)	1	0	0
Texas	Shaka Smart	VCU	4th	50–50 (.500)	23–31 (.426)	2	0	0
Texas Tech	Chris Beard	Little Rock	3rd	45–24 (.652)	25–22 (.532)	1	0	0
West Virginia	Bob Huggins	Kansas State	12th	255–130 (.662)	62–46 (.574)	9	1	0

== Preseason ==
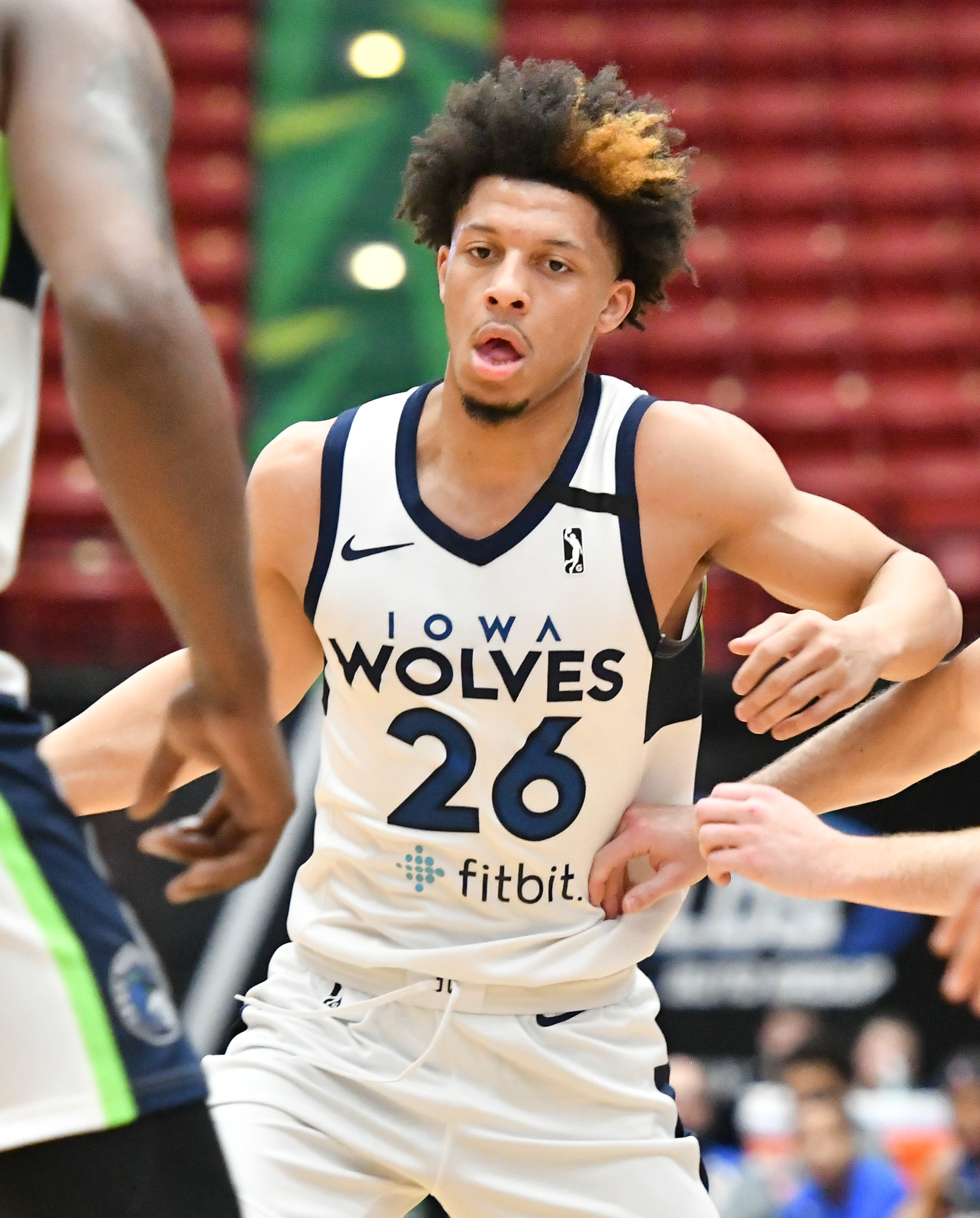
Lindell Wigginton

Big 12 Preseason Poll

	Big 12 Coaches	Points
1.	Kansas (8)	80
2.	Kansas State (2)	73
3.	West Virginia	61
T4.	TCU	54
T4.	Texas	54
6.	Iowa State	41
7.	Texas Tech	36
8.	Oklahoma	21
9.	Baylor	20
10.	Oklahoma State	10
Reference: (#) first place votes

Pre-Season All-Big 12 Team

Big 12 Coaches
Lindell Wigginton, G Iowa State
Dedric Lawson, F Kansas
Barry Brown Jr., G Kansas State
Dean Wade, F Kansas State
Sagaba Konate, F West Virginia

- Player of the Year: Dean Wade, Kansas State
- Newcomer of the Year: Dedric Lawson, Kansas
- Freshman of the Year: Quentin Grimes, Kansas

== Rankings ==
Legend
Increase in ranking
Decrease in ranking
Not ranked previous week

		Pre	Wk 2	Wk 3	Wk 4	Wk 5	Wk 6	Wk 7	Wk 8	Wk 9	Wk 10	Wk 11	Wk 12	Wk 13	Wk 14	Wk 15	Wk 16	Wk 17	Wk 18	Wk 19	Wk 20	Final
Baylor	AP														RV			RV	RV			
Baylor	C													RV	RV			RV	RV	RV		RV
Iowa State	AP		RV	RV	RV	RV	RV	RV	RV	RV	20	RV	24	20	17	23	19	RV	RV	RV	24	
Iowa State	C			RV	RV	RV	RV	RV	RV	RV	21	RV	25	20	16	22	20	RV	25	RV	23	25
Kansas	AP	1	2	2	2	2	1	1	5	5	7	7	9	11	13	14	12	15	13	17	17	
Kansas	C	1		2	2	2	1	1	5	6	9	8	10	12	14	14	12	16	14	18	17	16
Kansas State	AP	12	12	12	12	16	25	RV	RV	RV	RV	RV	RV	RV	RV	18	23	16	18	15	18	
Kansas State	C	11		12	10	15	24	RV	RV	RV	RV	RV	RV	RV	RV	18	21	15	17	14	14	19
Oklahoma	AP					RV	RV	RV	25	23	23	20	RV	RV								
Oklahoma	C						RV	RV	RV	25	22	19	RV	RV								RV
Oklahoma State	AP																					
Oklahoma State	C																					
TCU	AP	20	21	18	RV	RV	RV	RV	RV	RV	25	RV	RV	RV		RV						
TCU	C	21		18	RV		RV	RV	RV	RV	RV	RV	RV	RV								
Texas	AP	RV	RV	RV	17	RV	RV				RV					RV						
Texas	C	RV		RV	17	RV	RV				RV				RV	RV	RV		RV			RV
Texas Tech	AP	RV	RV	RV	20	13	11	12	11	11	8	8	14	16	18	15	14	11	8	7	9	
Texas Tech	C			RV	19	13	11	11	13	11	8	9	13	15	18	15	14	11	8	6	10	2
West Virginia	AP	13	RV	RV																		
West Virginia	C	13		RV	RV	RV																

== Regular season ==
=== Conference matrix ===
	Baylor	Iowa State	Kansas	Kansas State	Oklahoma	Oklahoma State	TCU	Texas	Texas Tech	West Virginia
vs. Baylor	—	0–2	2–0	2–0	0–2	1–1	1–1	1–1	1–1	0–2
vs. Iowa State	2–0	—	1–1	1–1	0–2	0–2	2–0	1–1	1–1	1–1
vs. Kansas	0–2	1–1	—	1–1	1–1	0–2	0–2	1–1	1–1	1–1
vs. Kansas State	0–2	1–1	1–1	—	0–2	0–2	0–2	1–1	1–1	0–2
vs. Oklahoma	2–0	2–0	1–1	2–0	—	0–2	0–2	1–1	2–0	1–1
vs. Oklahoma State	1–1	2–0	2–0	2–0	2–0	—	1–1	1–1	2–0	0–2
vs. TCU	1–1	0–2	2–0	2–0	2–0	1–1	—	0–2	2–0	1–1
vs. Texas	1–1	1–1	1–1	1–1	1–1	1–1	2–0	—	2–0	0–2
vs. Texas Tech	1–1	1–1	1–1	1–1	0–2	0–2	0–2	0–2	—	0–2
vs. West Virginia	2–0	1–1	1–1	2–0	1–1	2–0	1–1	2–0	2–0	—
Total	10–8	9–9	12–6	14–4	7–11	5–13	7–11	8–10	14–4	4–14

=== Big 12/SEC Challenge ===
Date	Time	Big 12 team	SEC team	Location	TV	Attendance	Winner	Leader
Sat., Jan. 26	12:00 PM	Baylor	Alabama	Ferrell Center • Waco, TX	ESPNU	7,094	Baylor (73-68)	Big 12 (1–0)
Sat., Jan. 26	12:00 PM	No. 24 Iowa State	No. 20 Ole Miss	The Pavilion at Ole Miss • Oxford, MS	ESPN	8,839	Iowa State (87–73)	Big 12 (2–0)
Sat., Jan. 26	12:00 PM	TCU	Florida	Schollmaier Arena • Fort Worth, TX	ESPN2	6,682	TCU (55-50)	Big 12 (3–0)
Sat., Jan. 26	2:00 PM	Kansas State	Texas A&M	Reed Arena • College Station, TX	ESPN	7,100	Texas A&M (65-53)	Big 12 (3-1)
Sat., Jan. 26	2:00 PM	Oklahoma State	South Carolina	Gallagher-Iba Arena • Stillwater, OK	ESPNU	7,658	Oklahoma State (74-70)	Big 12 (4-1)
Sat., Jan. 26	2:00 PM	Texas	Georgia	Stegeman Coliseum • Athens, GA	ESPN2	10,374	Georgia (98-88)	Big 12 (4-2)
Sat., Jan. 26	4:00 PM	Oklahoma	Vanderbilt	Lloyd Noble Center • Norman, OK	ESPN2	8,848	Oklahoma (86-55)	Big 12 (5-2)
Sat., Jan. 26	4:00 PM	West Virginia	No. 1 Tennessee	Thompson–Boling Arena • Knoxville, TN	ESPN	22,149	Tennessee (83-66)	Big 12 (5-3)
Sat., Jan. 26	6:00 PM	No. 9 Kansas	No. 8 Kentucky	Rupp Arena • Lexington, KY	ESPN	24,387	Kentucky (71-63)	Big 12 (5-4)
Sat., Jan. 26	6:00 PM	No. 14 Texas Tech	Arkansas	United Supermarkets Arena • Lubbock, TX	ESPN2	14,290	Texas Tech (67-64)	Big 12 (6-4)
Auburn, LSU, Mississippi State, and Missouri will not participate for the SEC. All times Eastern

== Postseason ==
=== Big 12 tournament ===
- March 13–16, 2019–Big 12 Conference Basketball Tournament, Sprint Center, Kansas City, MO.

2018 Big 12 men's basketball tournament seeds and results
Seed	School	Conf.	Over.	Tiebreaker	First round March 13	Quarterfinals March 14	Semifinals March 15	Championship March 16
1.	‡† Kansas State	14–4	25–8	1–1 vs TTU; 1–1 vs KU; 2–0 vs BU	Bye	#8 TCU	#5 Iowa State	
2.	† Texas Tech	14–4	26–6	1–1 vs KSU; 1–1 vs KU; 1–1 vs BU	Bye	#10 West Virginia		
3.	† Kansas	12–6	25–9		Bye	#6 Texas	#10 West Virginia	#5 Iowa State
4.	† Baylor	10–8	19–13		Bye	#5 Iowa State		
5.	† Iowa State	9–9	23–11		Bye	#4 Baylor	#1 Kansas State	#3 Kansas
6.	† Texas	8–10	16–16		Bye	#3 Kansas		
7.	Oklahoma	7–11	19–13	2–0 vs TCU	#10 West Virginia			
8.	TCU	7–11	20–13	0–2 vs OU	#9 Oklahoma State	#1 Kansas State		
9.	Oklahoma State	5–13	12–20		#8 TCU			
10.	West Virginia	4–14	14–20		#7 Oklahoma	#2 Texas Tech	#3 Kansas	
‡ – Big 12 regular season co-champions, and tournament No. 1 seed. † – Received a single-bye in the conference tournament. Overall records include all games played in the Big 12 tournament.

=== Bracket ===
First round Wednesday, March 13
8	TCU	73
9	Oklahoma State	70
7	Oklahoma	71
10	West Virginia	72

Quarterfinals; Thursday, March 14
1	Kansas State	70
8	TCU	61
4	Baylor	66
5	Iowa State	83
2	Texas Tech	74
10	West Virginia	79
3	Kansas	65
6	Texas	57

Semifinals; Friday, March 15
1	Kansas State	59
5	Iowa State	63
10	West Virginia	74
3	Kansas	88

Championship; Saturday, March 16
5	Iowa State	78
3	Kansas	66

=== NCAA tournament ===
Seed	Region	School	First round	Second round	Sweet 16	Elite Eight	Final Four	Championship
3	West	Texas Tech	#14 Northern Kentucky - March 22, Tulsa - W, 72–57	#6 Buffalo - March 24, Tulsa - W, 78–58	#2 Michigan - March 28, Anaheim - W, 63–44	#1 Gonzaga - March 30, Anaheim - W, 75–69	#2 Michigan State - April 6, Minneapolis - W, 71-51	#1 Virginia - April 8, Minneapolis - L, 77-85 OT
4	Midwest	Kansas	#13 Northeastern - March 21, Salt Lake City - W, 87–53	#5 Auburn - March 23, Salt Lake City - L, 75–89				
4	South	Kansas State	#13 UC Irvine - March 22, San Jose - L, 64–70					
6	Midwest	Iowa State	#11 Ohio State - March 22, Tulsa - L, 59–62					
9	West	Baylor	#8 Syracuse - March 21, Salt Lake City - W, 78–69	#1 Gonzaga - March 23, Salt Lake City - L, 71–83				
9	South	Oklahoma	#8 Ole Miss - March 22, Columbia - W, 95–72	#1 Virginia - March 24, Columbia - L, 51–63				
	6 Bids	W-L (%):	4–2 .667	1–3 .250	1–0 1.000	1–0 1.000	1–0 1.000	TOTAL: 8–6 .583

=== NIT ===
Seed	Region	School	First round	Second round	Quarterfinals	Semifinals	Final
1	TCU	TCU	#8 Sam Houston State - March 20, Fort Worth - W, 82–69	#4 Nebraska - March 24, Fort Worth - W, 88–72	#2 Creighton - March 26, Fort Worth - W, 71–58	#2 Texas - April 2, New York City - L, 44–58	
2	Alabama	Texas	#7 South Dakota State - March 19, Austin - W, 79–73	#3 Xavier - March 24, Austin - W, 78–76^{OT}	#4 Colorado - March 27, Austin - W, 68–55	#1 TCU - April 2, New York City - W, 58–44	#5 Lipscomb - April 4, New York City - W, 81–66
	2 Bids	W-L (%):	2–0 1.000	2–0 1.000	2–0 1.000	1–1 .500	TOTAL: 8–1 .889

=== College Basketball Invitational ===
School	First round	Quarterfinals	Semifinals	Finals
West Virginia	Grand Canyon - March 20, Morgantown - W, 77–63	Coastal Carolina - March 25, Morgantown - L, 91–109		
W-L (%):	1–0 1.000	0–1 .000		TOTAL: 1–1 .500

== Honors and awards ==
=== All-Americans ===
Consensus All-Americans
First Team	Second Team	Third Team
	Jarrett Culver, G, Texas Tech	Dedric Lawson, F, Kansas

To earn "consensus" status, a player must win honors from a majority of the following teams: the Associated Press, the USBWA, Sporting News, and the National Association of Basketball Coaches.

=== All-Big 12 awards and teams ===
2019 Big 12 Men's Basketball Individual Awards
Award	Recipient(s)
Player of the Year	Jarrett Culver, G, Texas Tech
Coach of the Year	Chris Beard, Texas Tech
Defensive Player of the Year	Barry Brown Jr., G, Kansas State
Sixth Man Award	Lindell Wigginton, G, Iowa State
Newcomer of the Year	Dedric Lawson, F, Kansas
Freshman of the Year	Jaxson Hayes, F, Texas

2019 Big 12 Men's Basketball All-Conference Teams
First Team	Second Team	Third Team	Freshman Team
Jarrett Culver†, G, Texas Tech; Dean Wade, F, Kansas State; Barry Brown Jr., G, Kansas State; Dedric Lawson, F, Kansas; Marial Shayok, G, Iowa State	Derek Culver, F, West Virginia; Matt Mooney, G, Texas Tech; Desmond Bane, G, TCU; Jaxson Hayes, F, Texas; Makai Mason, G, Baylor	Davide Moretti, G, Texas Tech; Alex Robinson, G, TCU; Christian James, G, Oklahoma; Kristian Doolittle, F, Oklahoma; Devon Dotson, G, Kansas	Derek Culver, F, West Virginia; Jaxson Hayes, F, Texas; Devon Dotson, G, Kansas; Talen Horton-Tucker, G, Iowa State; Jared Butler, G, Baylor
† - denotes unanimous selection

=== Phillips 66 Big 12 Men’s Basketball Weekly Awards ===
Week	Player of the Week	School	Newcomer of the Week	School	Ref.
Nov 12	Dedric Lawson	Kansas	Quentin Grimes	Kansas	
Nov 19	Lagerald Vick	Kansas	Talen Horton-Tucker; Jaxson Hayes	Iowa State; Texas	
Nov 26	Dedric Lawson (2)	Kansas	Jaxson Hayes (2)	Texas	
Dec 3	Lagerald Vick (2)	Kansas	Dedric Lawson	Kansas	
Dec 10	Christian James	Oklahoma	Tyrese Haliburton	Iowa State	
Dec 17	Jarrett Culver	Texas Tech	Dedric Lawson (2)	Kansas	
Dec 26	Dedric Lawson (3)	Kansas	Miles Reynolds; Curtis Jones	Oklahoma; Oklahoma State	
Dec 30	Tristan Clark	Baylor	Devon Dotson	Kansas	
Jan 7	Marial Shayok	Iowa State	Tyrese Haliburton (2)	Iowa State	
Jan 14	Barry Brown	Kansas State	Dedric Lawson (3)	Kansas	
Jan 21	King McClure; Dean Wade	Baylor; Kansas State	Marial Shayok	Iowa State	
Jan 28	Kouat Noi	TCU	Makai Mason; Dedric Lawson (4)	Baylor; Kansas	
Feb 4	Makai Mason	Baylor	Ochai Agbaji	Kansas	
Feb 11	Desmond Bane	TCU	Dedric Lawson (5); Courtney Ramey	Kansas; Texas	
Feb 18	Lindell Wigginton	Iowa State	Talen Horton-Tucker (2)	Iowa State	
Feb 25	Jarrett Culver (2)	Texas Tech	Jared Butler	Baylor	
Mar 4	Jase Febres	Texas	Jordan McCabe	West Virginia	
Mar 11	Jarrett Culver (3)	Texas Tech	Yor Anei	Oklahoma State	

== See also ==
- 2018–19 NCAA Division I men's basketball season
- Big 12 Conference
- Big 12/SEC Challenge
