= 2018–19 Baylor Bears basketball team =

American college basketball season

2018–19 Baylor Bears basketball

NCAA tournament, Second Round
- Conference: Big 12 Conference
- Record: 20–14 (10–8 Big 12)
- Head coach: Scott Drew (16th season)
- Associate head coach: Jerome Tang
- Assistant coaches: Alvin Brooks III; John Jakus
- Home arena: Ferrell Center

2018–19 Big 12 men's basketball standings
	Conf.				Overall
Team	W		L	PCT	W		L	PCT
No. 19 Kansas State	14	–	4	.778	25	–	9	.735
No. 2 Texas Tech	14	–	4	.778	31	–	7	.816
No. 16 Kansas	12	–	6	.667	26	–	10	.722
Baylor	10	–	8	.556	20	–	14	.588
No. 25 Iowa State †	9	–	9	.500	23	–	12	.657
Texas	8	–	10	.444	21	–	16	.568
Oklahoma	7	–	11	.389	20	–	14	.588
TCU	7	–	11	.389	23	–	14	.622
Oklahoma State	5	–	13	.278	12	–	20	.375
West Virginia	4	–	14	.222	15	–	21	.417
† 2019 Big 12 tournament winner Rankings from AP Poll

The 2018–19 Baylor Bears basketball team represented Baylor University in the 2018–19 NCAA Division I men's basketball season. This was head coach Scott Drew's 16th season at Baylor. The Bears competed in the Big 12 Conference and played their home games at the Ferrell Center in Waco, TX. They finished the season 20-14, 10-8 to finish in 4th place. They lost in the quarterfinals of the Big 12 tournament to Iowa State. They received a at-large bid to the NCAA Tournament where they defeated Syracuse in the first round before losing in the second round to Gonzaga.

== Previous season ==
The Bears finished the 2017–18 season 19–15 overall and 8–10 in Big 12 play, finishing in a four-way tie for sixth place. As the No. 6 seed in the Big 12 tournament, they were defeated by West Virginia in the quarterfinals. They were one of the last four teams not selected for the NCAA tournament and as a result earned a no. 1 seed in the National Invitation Tournament, where they defeated Wagner in the first round before losing to Mississippi State in the second round.

== Offseason ==
=== Departures ===
Name	Number	Pos.	Height	Weight	Year	Hometown	Reason for departure
Jo Lual-Acuil	0	F	7'0"	225	RS Senior	Melbourne, Australia	Graduated; Signed with Hapoel Jerusalem B.C.
Tyson Jolly	10	G	6'4"	190	RS Freshman	Oklahoma City, OK	Transferred to Trinity Valley CC
Leonard Allen	12	F	7'0"	235	Sophomore	Round Rock, TX	Injury
Manu Lecomte	20	G	5'11"	175	RS Senior	Brussels, Belgium	Graduated
Nuni Omot	21	F	6'9"	205	Senior	Mahtomedi, MN	Graduated
Jonathan Davis	30	F	6'6"	205	Junior	Argyle, TX	Transferred to Azusa Pacific
Terry Maston	31	F	6'8"	225	Senior	DeSoto, TX	Graduated

=== Incoming transfers ===
Name	Number	Pos.	Height	Weight	Year	Hometown	Previous School
Darius Allen	1	G	6'4"	185	Junior	Melbourne, FL	Palm Beach State College
Devonte Bandoo	2	G	6'3"	185	Junior	Brampton, ON	Hutchinson CC
MaCio Teague	5	G	6'3"	190	Junior	Cincinnati, OH	UNC Asheville
Makai Mason	11	G	6'1"	185	RS Senior	Greenfield, MA	Yale
Davion Mitchell	45	G	6'1"	200	Sophomore	Hinesville, GA	Auburn

=== 2018 recruiting class ===
College recruiting information
Name	Hometown	School	Height	Weight	Commit date
Jared Butler #20 PG	Reserve, LA	Riverside Academy	6 ft 3 in (1.91 m)	180 lb (82 kg)	Aug 19, 2018
Jared Butler #20 PG	Recruit ratings: Scout: Rivals: 247Sports: ESPN:				
Matthew Mayer #24 SF	Austin, TX	Westlake High School	6 ft 7 in (2.01 m)	200 lb (91 kg)	Jun 13, 2017
Matthew Mayer #24 SF	Recruit ratings: Scout: Rivals: 247Sports: ESPN:				
Flo Thamba #26 C	Grundy, VA	Mountain Mission School	6 ft 9 in (2.06 m)	224 lb (102 kg)	Jan 15, 2018
Flo Thamba #26 C	Recruit ratings: Scout: Rivals: 247Sports: ESPN:				
Overall recruit ranking:
Note: In many cases, Scout, Rivals, 247Sports, On3, and ESPN may conflict in their listings of height and weight.; In these cases, the average was taken. ESPN grades are on a 100-point scale.; Sources: "2018 Team Ranking". Rivals.

=== 2019 recruiting class ===
College recruiting information (2019)
Name	Hometown	School	Height	Weight	Commit date
Jordan Turner #23 SF	Houston, TX	Sunrise Christian Academy	6 ft 8 in (2.03 m)	180 lb (82 kg)	Jun 13, 2018
Jordan Turner #23 SF	Recruit ratings: Scout: Rivals: 247Sports: ESPN:				
Overall recruit ranking:
Note: In many cases, Scout, Rivals, 247Sports, On3, and ESPN may conflict in their listings of height and weight.; In these cases, the average was taken. ESPN grades are on a 100-point scale.; Sources: "2019 Team Ranking". Rivals.

== Roster ==
2018–19 Baylor Bears men's basketball team
Players
Coaches

Pos.	#	Name	Height	Weight	Year	Previous school	Hometown
F	0	Flo Thamba	6 ft 10 in (2.08 m)	245 lb (111 kg)	Fr	Mountain Mission	Kinshasa, DR Congo
G	1	Darius Allen	6 ft 4 in (1.93 m)	205 lb (93 kg)	Jr	Chaminade-Madonna Preparatory; Palm Beach State	Melbourne, FL
G	2	Devonte Bandoo	6 ft 3 in (1.91 m)	195 lb (88 kg)	Jr	Faith Baptist; Hutchinson CC	Mississauga, ON
G	3	King McClure	6 ft 3 in (1.91 m)	215 lb (98 kg)	Sr	Triple A Academy	Dallas, TX
G/F	4	Mario Kegler	6 ft 7 in (2.01 m)	230 lb (104 kg)	RS So	Oak Hill Academy; Mississippi State	Jackson, MS
G	5	MaCio Teague (redshirt)	6 ft 3 in (1.91 m)	190 lb (86 kg)	Jr	Walnut Hills; UNC Asheville	Cincinnati, OH
G	10	Makai Mason	6 ft 1 in (1.85 m)	185 lb (84 kg)	RS Sr	Hotchkiss School; Yale	Greenfield, MA
G/F	11	Mark Vital	6 ft 5 in (1.96 m)	230 lb (104 kg)	RS So	Advanced Prep International	Lake Charles, LA
G	12	Jared Butler	6 ft 3 in (1.91 m)	185 lb (84 kg)	Fr	Riverside Academy	Reserve, LA
G/F	13	Jackson Moffatt (W) (redshirt)	6 ft 6 in (1.98 m)	210 lb (95 kg)	Fr	Magnolia	Magnolia, TX
G	15	Obim Okeke (W)	6 ft 0 in (1.83 m)	225 lb (102 kg)	Jr	Bishop Gorman	Las Vegas, NV
G	22	Jake Lindsey	6 ft 5 in (1.96 m)	200 lb (91 kg)	Sr	Olympus	Houston, TX
G/F	24	Matthew Mayer	6 ft 9 in (2.06 m)	200 lb (91 kg)	Fr	Westlake	Austin, TX
F	25	Tristan Clark	6 ft 9 in (2.06 m)	240 lb (109 kg)	So	Wagner	San Antonio, TX
F	33	Freddie Gillespie	6 ft 8 in (2.03 m)	240 lb (109 kg)	RS Jr	East Ridge; Carleton	St. Paul, MN
G	45	Davion Mitchell (redshirt)	6 ft 1 in (1.85 m)	200 lb (91 kg)	So	Liberty County; Auburn	Hinesville, GA

Head coach

- Scott Drew (Butler)

Assistant coach(es)

- Alvin Brooks III (Idaho State)
- John Jakus (Trinity International)
- Jerome Tang (Charter Oak)

Legend

- (C) Team captain
- (S) Suspended
- (I) Ineligible
- (W) Walk-on
- Injured
- Current redshirt

Roster

== Schedule and results ==
Date time, TV	Rank^{#}	Opponent^{#}	Result	Record	Site (attendance) city, state
Regular season
Nov 6, 2018*; 8:30 pm, FSSW Alt.		Texas Southern	L 69–72	0–1	Ferrell Center (4,327); Waco, TX
Nov 10, 2018*; 5:00 pm, FSSW		Southern; Emerald Coast Classic first round	W 80–53	1–1	Ferrell Center (4,344); Waco, TX
Nov 12, 2018*; 7:00 pm, FSSW Alt.		Prairie View A&M	W 91–80	2–1	Ferrell Center (4,019); Waco, TX
Nov 16, 2018*; 11:00 am, FSSW		Nicholls State; Emerald Coast Classic second round	W 81–54	3–1	Ferrell Center (8,721); Waco, TX
Nov 23, 2018*; 8:30 pm, CBSSN		vs. Ole Miss; Emerald Coast Classic semifinals	L 70–78	3–2	The Arena at NFSC (1,250); Niceville, FL
Nov 24, 2018*; 3:00 pm		vs. George Mason; Emerald Coast Classic 3rd place game	W 72–61	4–2	The Arena at NFSC (1,250); Niceville, FL
Nov 27, 2018*; 7:00 pm, FSSW+		South Dakota	W 63–57	5–2	Ferrell Center (4,083); Waco, TX
Dec 1, 2018*; 7:00 pm, CBSSN		at Wichita State	L 63–71	5–3	Charles Koch Arena (10,506); Wichita, KS
Dec 15, 2018*; 10:00 pm, ESPN2		at Arizona	W 58–49	6–3	McKale Center (13,058); Tucson, AZ
Dec 18, 2018*; 7:30 pm, FSSW Alt.		Stephen F. Austin	L 58–59	6–4	Ferrell Center (4,336); Waco, TX
Dec 21, 2018*; 6:00 pm, ESPN2		Oregon	W 57–47	7–4	Ferrell Center (7,411); Waco, TX
Dec 29, 2018*; 5:00 pm, FSSW+		New Orleans	W 84–44	8–4	Ferrell Center (6,123); Waco, TX
Jan 5, 2019; 3:00 pm, ESPNU		at TCU	L 81–85	8–5 (0–1)	Schollmaier Arena (6,396); Fort Worth, TX
Jan 8, 2019; 6:00 pm, ESPNews		No. 20 Iowa State	W 73–70	9–5 (1–1)	Ferrell Center (5,930); Waco, TX
Jan 12, 2019; 3:00 pm, ESPN		No. 7 Kansas	L 68–73	9–6 (1–2)	Ferrell Center (9,091); Waco, TX
Jan 14, 2019; 8:00 pm, ESPNU		at Oklahoma State	W 73–69	10–6 (2–2)	Gallagher-Iba Arena (8,194); Stillwater, OK
Jan 19, 2019; 5:00 pm, ESPN2		No. 8 Texas Tech	W 73–62	11–6 (3–2)	Ferrell Center (9,018); Waco, TX
Jan 21, 2019; 8:00 pm, ESPNU		at West Virginia	W 85–73	12–6 (4–2)	WVU Coliseum (9,936); Morgantown, WV
Jan 26, 2019*; 11:00 am, ESPNU		Alabama; Big 12/SEC Challenge	W 73–68	13–6	Ferrell Center (7,094); Waco, TX
Jan 28, 2019; 8:00 pm, ESPNU		at Oklahoma	W 77–47	14–6 (5–2)	Lloyd Noble Center (10,193); Norman, OK
Feb 2, 2019; 7:00 pm, ESPNU		TCU	W 90–64	15–6 (6–2)	Ferrell Center (7,337); Waco, TX
Feb 6, 2019; 7:00 pm, LHN		at Texas	L 72–84	15–7 (6–3)	Frank Erwin Center (9,831); Austin, TX
Feb 9, 2019; 5:00 pm, ESPN2		Kansas State	L 63–70	15–8 (6–4)	Ferrell Center (8,466); Waco, TX
Feb 11, 2019; 8:00 pm, ESPN2		Oklahoma	W 59–53	16–8 (7–4)	Ferrell Center (4,517); Waco, TX
Feb 16, 2019; 1:00 pm, ESPN		at No. 15 Texas Tech	L 61–86	16–9 (7–5)	United Supermarkets Arena (14,598); Lubbock, TX
Feb 19, 2019; 8:00 pm, ESPN2		at No. 19 Iowa State	W 73–69	17–9 (8–5)	Hilton Coliseum (14,084); Ames, IA
Feb 23, 2019; 1:00 pm, ESPNU		West Virginia	W 82–75	18–9 (9–5)	Ferrell Center (6,262); Waco, TX
Feb 27, 2019; 8:00 pm, ESPN2		Texas	W 84–83 ^{OT}	19–9 (10–5)	Ferrell Center (5,796); Waco, TX
Mar 2, 2019; 7:00 pm, ESPN2		at No. 16 Kansas State	L 60–66	19–10 (10–6)	Bramlage Coliseum (9,855); Manhattan, KS
Mar 6, 2019; 8:00 pm, ESPN2		Oklahoma State	L 64–67	19–11 (10–7)	Ferrell Center (5,041); Waco, TX
Mar 9, 2019; 1:00 pm, ESPN		at No. 13 Kansas	L 70–78	19–12 (10–8)	Allen Fieldhouse (16,300); Lawrence, KS
Big 12 tournament
Mar 14, 2019; 12:30 pm, ESPN2	(4)	vs. (5) Iowa State; Quarterfinals	L 66–83	19–13	Sprint Center (18,930); Kansas City, MO
NCAA tournament
Mar 21, 2019*; 8:57 pm, truTV	(9 W)	vs. (8 W) Syracuse; First Round	W 78–69	20–13	Vivint Smart Home Arena (16,807); Salt Lake City, UT
Mar 23, 2019*; 6:10 pm, TBS	(9 W)	vs. (1 W) No. 4 Gonzaga; Second Round	L 71–83	20–14	Vivint Smart Home Arena (17,792); Salt Lake City, UT
*Non-conference game. ^{#}Rankings from AP Poll. (#) Tournament seedings in parentheses. W=West. All times are in Central Time.
