= 2018–19 Kansas State Wildcats men's basketball team =

American college basketball season

2018–19 Kansas State Wildcats men's basketball

Big 12 regular season co-champions Paradise Jam champions

NCAA tournament, First Round
- Conference: Big 12 Conference

Ranking
- Coaches: No. 19
- AP: No. 18
- Record: 25–9 (14–4 Big 12)
- Head coach: Bruce Weber (7th season)
- Assistant coaches: Chris Lowery (7th season); Chester Frazier (7th season); Brad Korn (4th season - 3rd consecutive)
- Home arena: Bramlage Coliseum (12,528)

2018–19 Big 12 men's basketball standings
	Conf.				Overall
Team	W		L	PCT	W		L	PCT
No. 19 Kansas State	14	–	4	.778	25	–	9	.735
No. 2 Texas Tech	14	–	4	.778	31	–	7	.816
No. 16 Kansas	12	–	6	.667	26	–	10	.722
Baylor	10	–	8	.556	20	–	14	.588
No. 25 Iowa State †	9	–	9	.500	23	–	12	.657
Texas	8	–	10	.444	21	–	16	.568
Oklahoma	7	–	11	.389	20	–	14	.588
TCU	7	–	11	.389	23	–	14	.622
Oklahoma State	5	–	13	.278	12	–	20	.375
West Virginia	4	–	14	.222	15	–	21	.417
† 2019 Big 12 tournament winner Rankings from AP Poll

The 2018–19 Kansas State Wildcats men's basketball team represented Kansas State University in the 2018–19 NCAA Division I men's basketball season. Their head coach was Bruce Weber in his seventh year at the helm of the Wildcats. The team played its home games in Bramlage Coliseum in Manhattan, Kansas as members of the Big 12 Conference. They finished the season 25–9, to finish in first place. In the Big 12 tournament, they defeated TCU in the quarterfinals before losing to Iowa State in the semifinals. They received an at-large bid to the NCAA Tournament where they were upset by UC Irvine in the First Round.

== Previous season ==
The Wildcats finished the 2017–18 season 25–12, 10–8 in Big 12 play to finish in fourth place. They defeated TCU in the quarterfinals of the Big 12 tournament before losing to Kansas in the semifinals. They received an at-large bid to the NCAA tournament as the No. 9 seed in the South region. There they defeated Creighton, UMBC, and Kentucky to advance to the Elite Eight. In the Elite Eight, they lost to Loyola–Chicago.

== Offseason ==
=== Departures ===
Name	Number	Pos.	Height	Weight	Year	Hometown	Notes
Mawdo Sallah	1	F	6'9"	235	RS Junior	Latri Kunda, Gambia	Transferred to Radford
Brian Patrick	11	G	6'5"	195	RS Sophomore	Fort Lauderdale, FL	Transferred to Purdue Fort Wayne
Mason Schoen	12	G	6'2"	185	RS Senior	Overland Park, KS	Graduated
Amaad Wainwright	23	G	6'2"	200	Junior	Kansas City, MO	Transferred
Kade Kinnamon	40	G	6'0"	175	Junior	St. John, KS	Granduated

=== Incoming transfers ===
Name	Number	Pos.	Height	Weight	Year	Hometown	Notes
Austin Trice	23	PF	6'7"	230	Junior	Chicago, IL	Wabash Valley College.

=== 2018 recruiting class ===
College recruiting information
Name	Hometown	School	Height	Weight	Commit date
Shaun Williams; PG	St. Louis, MO	Hazelwood Central High School	6 ft 3 in (1.91 m)	175 lb (79 kg)	Aug 4, 2017
Shaun Williams; PG	Recruit ratings: Scout: Rivals: 247Sports: ESPN:				
Overall recruit ranking: Scout: Not Ranked Top 20 Rivals: Not Ranked Top 25 ESPN: Not Ranked Top 25
Note: In many cases, Scout, Rivals, 247Sports, On3, and ESPN may conflict in their listings of height and weight.; In these cases, the average was taken. ESPN grades are on a 100-point scale.; Sources: "2018 Kansas State Basketball Commits". Rivals.; "2018 Kansas State Basketball Commits". Scout.; "2018 Kansas State Basketball Commits". ESPN.; "Scout.com Team Recruiting Rankings". Scout.; "2018 Team Ranking". Rivals.

== Roster ==
2018–19 Kansas State Wildcats men's basketball team
Players
Coaches

Pos.	#	Name	Height	Weight	Year	Previous school	Hometown
G	00	Mike McGuirl	6 ft 2 in (1.88 m)	195 lb (88 kg)	So	East Catholic High School	Ellington, CT
G	1	Shaun Neal-Williams	6 ft 3 in (1.91 m)	170 lb (77 kg)	Fr	Hazelwood Central High School	St. Louis, MO
G	2	Cartier Diarra	6 ft 4 in (1.93 m)	190 lb (86 kg)	RS So	West Florence High School	Florence, SC
G	3	Kamau Stokes	6 ft 0 in (1.83 m)	170 lb (77 kg)	Sr	Fork Union Military Academy	Baltimore, MD
G	5	Barry Brown Jr.	6 ft 3 in (1.91 m)	195 lb (88 kg)	Sr	Gibbs High School	St. Petersburg, FL
F	14	Makol Mawien	6 ft 9 in (2.06 m)	245 lb (111 kg)	Jr	New Mexico Junior College	West Valley City, UT
G/F	20	Xavier Sneed	6 ft 5 in (1.96 m)	220 lb (100 kg)	Jr	Hazelwood Central High School	Florissant, MO
F	21	James Love III	6 ft 11 in (2.11 m)	240 lb (109 kg)	RS So	American Heritage School	Fort Lauderdale, FL
F	23	Austin Trice	6 ft 7 in (2.01 m)	235 lb (107 kg)	Jr	Wabash Valley College	Chicago, IL
F	24	Pierson McAtee (W)	6 ft 6 in (1.98 m)	200 lb (91 kg)	RS Jr	Manhattan High School	Manhattan, KS
F	32	Dean Wade (injured)	6 ft 10 in (2.08 m)	228 lb (103 kg)	Sr	St. John-Hudson High School	St. John, KS
F	34	Levi Stockard III	6 ft 8 in (2.03 m)	240 lb (109 kg)	So	Vashon High School	St. Louis, MO
F	35	Patrick Muldoon (W)	6 ft 7 in (2.01 m)	210 lb (95 kg)	RS Jr	Eastern Illinois	Basehor, KS
F	45	Nigel Shadd	6 ft 9 in (2.06 m)	250 lb (113 kg)	RS Fr	Tri-City Christian Academy	Mesa, AZ

Head coach

- Bruce Weber (Milwaukee)

Assistant coach(es)

- Chris Lowery (Southern Illinois)
- Chester Frazier (Illinois)
- Brad Korn (Southern Illinois)

Legend

- (C) Team captain
- (S) Suspended
- (I) Ineligible
- (W) Walk-on
- Injured
- Current redshirt

Roster

== Schedule and results ==
Date time, TV	Rank^{#}	Opponent^{#}	Result	Record	High points	High rebounds	High assists	Site (attendance) city, state
Exhibition
November 2, 2018*; 7:00 pm, FSKC	No. 12	Pittsburg State	W 79–39		14 – Tied	12 – Trice	6 – Stokes	Bramlage Coliseum (8,652); Manhattan, KS
Regular season
November 9, 2018*; 7:00 pm, FSKC	No. 12	Kennesaw State; Paradise Jam opening round	W 56–41	1–0	15 – Tied	12 – Trice	5 – Stokes	Bramlage Coliseum (11,021); Manhattan, KS
November 12, 2018*; 8:00 pm, FSKC	No. 12	Denver	W 64–56	2–0	25 – Brown	16 – Wade	4 – Wade	Bramlage Coliseum (9,412); Manhattan, KS
November 16, 2018*; 6:50 pm, FloSports	No. 12	vs. Eastern Kentucky; Paradise Jam quarterfinals	W 95–68	3–0	16 – Sneed	10 – Trice	5 – Stokes	Sports and Fitness Center (2,162); St. Thomas, VI
November 18, 2018*; 6:55 pm, FloSports	No. 12	vs. Penn; Paradise Jam semifinals	W 64–48	4–0	17 – Wade	8 – Tied	4 – Wade	Sports and Fitness Center (2,460); St. Thomas, VI
November 19, 2018*; 6:30 pm, FloSports	No. 12	vs. Missouri; Paradise Jam final	W 82–67	5–0	21 – Wade	6 – Tied	6 – Brown	Sports and Fitness Center (2,274); St. Thomas, VI
November 24, 2018*; 3:30 pm, FSKC	No. 12	Lehigh	W 77–58	6–0	18 – Wade	9 – Mawien	5 – Tied	Bramlage Coliseum (8,578); Manhattan, KS
December 1, 2018*; 1:30 pm, FS1	No. 12	at Marquette	L 71–83	6–1	12 – Tied	4 – Tied	3 – Stokes	Fiserv Forum (15,517); Milwaukee, WI
December 8, 2018*; 3:30 pm, CBSSN	No. 16	at Tulsa	L 46–47	6–2	13 – Sneed	10 – Sneed	4 – Stokes	Reynolds Center (5,719); Tulsa, OK
December 15, 2018*; 7:00 pm, FSKC	No. 25-T	Georgia State	W 71–59	7-2	21 – Brown	9 – Wade	6 – Sneed	Bramlage Coliseum (9,563); Manhattan, KS
December 19, 2018*; 7:00 pm, FSKC		Southern Miss	W 55–51	8–2	18 – Stokes	14 – Sneed	3 – Tied	Bramlage Coliseum (8,815); Manhattan, KS
December 22, 2018*; 6:00 pm, ESPN2		vs. Vanderbilt; Wildcat Showcase	W 69–58	9–2	15 – Mawien	9 – Sneed	5 – Stokes	Sprint Center (14,062); Kansas City, MO
December 29, 2018*; 7:00 pm, FSKC		George Mason	W 59–58	10–2	20 – Stokes	9 – Sneed	7 – Brown	Bramlage Coliseum (9,973); Manhattan, KS
January 2, 2019; 8:00 pm, ESPNU		Texas	L 47–67	10–3 (0–1)	13 – Mawien	5 – Tied	5 – Brown	Bramlage Coliseum (10,137); Manhattan, KS
January 5, 2019; 1:00 pm, ESPNU		at No. 11 Texas Tech	L 57–63	10–4 (0–2)	16 – Brown	11 – Maiwen	2 – Tied	United Supermarkets Arena (15,098); Lubbock, TX
January 9, 2019; 6:00 pm, ESPNU		West Virginia	W 71–69	11–4 (1–2)	29 – Brown	6 – Sneed	6 – Stokes	Bramlage Coliseum (9,590); Manhattan, KS
January 12, 2019; 11:00 am, ESPN2		at No. 20 Iowa State	W 58–57	12–4 (2–2)	23 – Brown	9 – Wade	4 – Tied	Hilton Coliseum (14,384); Ames, IA
January 16, 2019; 6:00 pm, ESPN2		at No. 20 Oklahoma	W 74–61	13–4 (3–2)	25 – Brown	7 – Mawien	5 – Brown	Lloyd Noble Center (7,597); Norman, OK
January 19, 2019; 3:00 pm, ESPN2		TCU	W 65–55	14–4 (4–2)	18 – Sneed	5 – Brown	6 – Wade	Bramlage Coliseum (9,809); Manhattan, KS
January 22, 2019; 6:00 pm, ESPN2		No. 14-T Texas Tech	W 58–45	15–4 (5–2)	15 – Brown	7 – Brown	3 – Stokes	Bramlage Coliseum (11,134); Manhattan, KS
January 26, 2019*; 1:00 pm, ESPN		at Texas A&M; Big 12/SEC Challenge	L 53–65	15–5	17 – Wade	7 – Tied	6 – Stokes	Reed Arena (7,100); College Station, TX
February 2, 2019; 5:00 pm, ESPNU		at Oklahoma State	W 75–57	16–5 (6–2)	24 – Wade	6 – Wade	3 – Tied	Gallagher-Iba Arena (8,457); Stillwater, OK
February 5, 2019; 8:00 pm, ESPN		No. 13 Kansas; Sunflower Showdown	W 74–67	17–5 (7–2)	18 – Brown	9 – Wade	5 – Tied	Bramlage Coliseum (12,528); Manhattan, KS
February 9, 2019; 5:00 pm, ESPN2		at Baylor	W 70–63	18–5 (8–2)	20 – Stokes	7 – Tied	6 – Brown	Ferrell Center (8,466); Waco, TX
February 12, 2019; 8:00 pm, ESPN2	No. 18	at Texas	W 71–64	19–5 (9–2)	16 – Tied	8 – Sneed	6 – Wade	Frank Erwin Center (9,418); Austin, TX
February 16, 2019; 3:00 pm, ESPN2	No. 18	No. 23 Iowa State	L 64–78	19–6 (9–3)	23 – Brown	7 – Mawien	3 – Tied	Bramlage Coliseum (12,528); Manhattan, KS
February 18, 2019; 8:00 pm, ESPN	No. 23	at West Virginia	W 65–51	20–6 (10–3)	21 – Brown	7 – Tied	4 – Brown	WVU Coliseum (9,266); Morgantown, WV
February 23, 2019; 3:00 pm, ESPN2	No. 23	Oklahoma State	W 85–46	21–6 (11–3)	12 – Tied	7 – Brown	6 – Neal-Williams	Bramlage Coliseum (10,699); Manhattan, KS
February 25, 2019; 8:00 pm, ESPN	No. 16	at No. 15 Kansas; Sunflower Showdown	L 49–64	21–7 (11–4)	12 – Stokes	5 – Tied	4 – Stokes	Allen Fieldhouse (16,300); Lawrence, KS
March 2, 2019; 7:00 pm, ESPN2	No. 16	Baylor	W 66–60	22–7 (12–4)	20 – Wade	7 – Brown	5 – Stokes	Bramlage Coliseum (9,855); Manhattan, KS
March 4, 2019; 8:00 pm, ESPN2	No. 18	at TCU	W 64–52	23–7 (13–4)	16 – Brown	6 – Tied	5 – Wade	Schollmaier Arena (6,258); Fort Worth, TX
March 9, 2019; 5:00 pm, ESPN2	No. 18	Oklahoma	W 68–53	24–7 (14–4)	19 – Stokes	7 – Tied	6 – Stokes	Bramlage Coliseum (12,528); Manhattan, KS
Big 12 Tournament
March 14, 2019; 1:30 pm, ESPN2	(1) No. 15	vs. (8) TCU; Quarterfinals	W 70–61	25–7	19 – Sneed	8 – Mawien	6 – Brown	Sprint Center (18,930); Kansas City, MO
March 15, 2019; 6:00 pm, ESPN2	(1) No. 15	vs. (5) Iowa State; Semifinals	L 59–63	25–8	15 – Diarra	7 – Tied	3 – Brown	Sprint Center (19,066); Kansas City, MO
NCAA Tournament
March 22, 2019*; 1:00 pm, TBS	(4 S) No. 18	vs. (13 S) UC Irvine; First Round	L 64–70	25–9	18 – Stokes	12 – Mawien	4 – Stokes	SAP Center (14,331); San Jose, CA
*Non-conference game. ^{#}Rankings from AP Poll. (#) Tournament seedings in parentheses. All times are in Central Time.

== Rankings ==
Ranking movements Legend: ██ Increase in ranking ██ Decrease in ranking — = Not ranked RV = Received votes т = Tied with team above or below
	Week																				
Poll	Pre	1	2	3	4	5	6	7	8	9	10	11	12	13	14	15	16	17	18	19	Final
AP	12	12	12	12	16	25-T	RV	RV	RV	—	RV	RV	RV	RV	18	23	16	18	15	18	Not released
Coaches	11	11^	12	10-T	15	24	RV	RV	RV	RV	RV	RV	RV	RV	18	21	15	17	14	14	19

*AP does not release post-NCAA tournament rankings
^Coaches did not release a Week 2 poll.
