= 2018–19 TCU Horned Frogs men's basketball team =

American college basketball season

2018–19 TCU Horned Frogs men's basketball

Diamond Head Classic champions

NIT, Semifinals
- Conference: Big 12 Conference
- Record: 23–14 (7–11 Big 12)
- Head coach: Jamie Dixon (3rd season)
- Assistant coaches: Ryan Miller (3rd season); Scott Cross; Corey Barker
- Home arena: Schollmaier Arena

2018–19 Big 12 men's basketball standings
	Conf.				Overall
Team	W		L	PCT	W		L	PCT
No. 19 Kansas State	14	–	4	.778	25	–	9	.735
No. 2 Texas Tech	14	–	4	.778	31	–	7	.816
No. 16 Kansas	12	–	6	.667	26	–	10	.722
Baylor	10	–	8	.556	20	–	14	.588
No. 25 Iowa State †	9	–	9	.500	23	–	12	.657
Texas	8	–	10	.444	21	–	16	.568
Oklahoma	7	–	11	.389	20	–	14	.588
TCU	7	–	11	.389	23	–	14	.622
Oklahoma State	5	–	13	.278	12	–	20	.375
West Virginia	4	–	14	.222	15	–	21	.417
† 2019 Big 12 tournament winner Rankings from AP Poll

The 2018–19 TCU Horned Frogs men's basketball team represented Texas Christian University in the 2018–19 NCAA Division I men's basketball season, led by head coach Jamie Dixon in his third season at TCU. The Horned Frogs competed as members of the Big 12 Conference and played their home games at Schollmaier Arena in Fort Worth, Texas. They finished the season 23–14, 7–11 to tie for 7th place. As the No. 8 seed in the Big 12 Tournament, they defeated Oklahoma State in the first round before losing to Kansas State in the quarterfinals. They received an at-large bid to the NIT, where they defeated Sam Houston State, Nebraska and Creighton to advance to the semifinals, where they lost to in conference member Texas.

== Previous season ==
The Horned Frogs finished the season 21–12, 9–9 in Big 12 play to finish in fifth place. They lost in the quarterfinals of the Big 12 tournament to Kansas State. They received an at-large bid to the NCAA tournament for the first time since 1998 as the No. 6 seed in the Midwest region, where they lost in the first round to Syracuse.

== Offseason ==
=== Departures ===
Name	Number	Pos.	Height	Weight	Year	Hometown	Reason for departure
Shawn Olden	2	G	6'3"	180	Junior	Tulsa, OK	Left team
Vladimír Brodziansky	10	F	6'11"	230	Senior	Prievidza, Slovakia	Graduated
Dalton Dry	20	G	6'4"	190	Senior	Fort Worth, TX	Graduated
Ahmed Hamdy	23	F	6'9"	235	Senior	Alexandria, Egypt	Graduated
Clayton Crawford	33	F	6'3"	210	Senior	Aspen, CO	Graduated
Kenrich Williams	34	F	6'7"	210	Senior	Waco, TX	Graduated
Austin Sottitle	45	F	6'6"	225	Senior	St. Louis, MO	Graduated

=== Incoming transfers ===
Name	Number	Pos.	Height	Weight	Year	Hometown	Previous school
Yuat Alok	35	C	6'11"	200	Junior	Auckland, New Zealand	Chipola College

== Recruits ==
=== Recruiting class of 2018 ===
College recruiting
Name	Hometown	School	Height	Weight	Commit date
Kaden Archie #26 SF	Midlothian, TX	Midlothian High School	6 ft 6 in (1.98 m)	200 lb (91 kg)	Oct 15, 2017
Kaden Archie #26 SF	Recruit ratings: Scout: Rivals: 247Sports: ESPN:				
Russell Barlow #21 C	Richardson, TX	Bishop Lynch High School	6 ft 7 in (2.01 m)	215 lb (98 kg)	Aug 3, 2017
Russell Barlow #21 C	Recruit ratings: Scout: Rivals: 247Sports: ESPN:				
Kendric Davis #35 PG	Houston, TX	Sam Houston High School	5 ft 11 in (1.80 m)	165 lb (75 kg)	Jun 16, 2016
Kendric Davis #35 PG	Recruit ratings: Scout: Rivals: 247Sports: ESPN:				
Angus McWilliam; C	Christchurch City, NZ	Middleton Grange School	6 ft 11 in (2.11 m)	235 lb (107 kg)	Apr 19, 2017
Angus McWilliam; C	Recruit ratings: Rivals:				
Overall recruit ranking:
Note: In many cases, Scout, Rivals, 247Sports, On3, and ESPN may conflict in their listings of height and weight.; In these cases, the average was taken. ESPN grades are on a 100-point scale.; Sources: "2018 TCU Commits". Rivals.; "2018 Team Ranking". Rivals.

=== Recruiting class of 2019 ===
College recruiting (2019)
Name	Hometown	School	Height	Weight	Commit date
P. J. Fuller #11 SG	Seattle, WA	Findlay Prep	6 ft 4 in (1.93 m)	175 lb (79 kg)	Sep 8, 2018
P. J. Fuller #11 SG	Recruit ratings: Scout: Rivals: 247Sports: ESPN:				
Diante Smith; SF	Fort Walton Beach, FL	Choctawhatchee High School	6 ft 7 in (2.01 m)	195 lb (88 kg)	Sep 9, 2018
Diante Smith; SF	Recruit ratings: Scout: Rivals: 247Sports: ESPN:				
Overall recruit ranking:
Note: In many cases, Scout, Rivals, 247Sports, On3, and ESPN may conflict in their listings of height and weight.; In these cases, the average was taken. ESPN grades are on a 100-point scale.; Sources: "2019 TCU Commits". Rivals.; "2019 Team Ranking". Rivals.

== Roster ==
2018–19 TCU Horned Frogs men's basketball team
Players
Coaches

Pos.	#	Name	Height	Weight	Year	Previous school	Hometown
F	0	Kaden Archie	6 ft 6 in (1.98 m)	205 lb (93 kg)	Fr	Midlothian	Midlothian, TX
G	1	Desmond Bane	6 ft 5 in (1.96 m)	215 lb (98 kg)	Jr	Seton Catholic	Richmond, IN
G	5	Kendric Davis	5 ft 11 in (1.8 m)	180 lb (82 kg)	Fr	Sam Houston	Houston, TX
G	10	Jaylen Fisher	6 ft 2 in (1.88 m)	195 lb (88 kg)	Jr	Bolton	Arlington, TN
F	11	Lat Mayen	6 ft 8 in (2.03 m)	210 lb (95 kg)	RS Fr	Basketball Australia's Centre of Excellence	Adelaide, Australia
F	12	Kouat Noi	6 ft 8 in (2.03 m)	205 lb (93 kg)	RS So	Montverde Academy (FL)	Newcastle, Australia
G	13	Dylan Arnette	6 ft 3 in (1.91 m)	175 lb (79 kg)	Fr	Dallas Carter	DeSoto, TX
F	15	JD Miller	6 ft 8 in (2.03 m)	235 lb (107 kg)	Sr	Seagoville	Dallas, TX
C	21	Kevin Samuel	6 ft 11 in (2.11 m)	250 lb (113 kg)	RS Fr	Redemption Christian	Houston, TX
G	22	RJ Nembhard	6 ft 4 in (1.93 m)	195 lb (88 kg)	RS Fr	Keller HS	Keller, TX
F/C	23	Angus McWilliam	6 ft 10 in (2.08 m)	235 lb (107 kg)	RS Fr	Middleton Grange	Christchurch, New Zealand
G	25	Alex Robinson	6 ft 1 in (1.85 m)	175 lb (79 kg)	Sr	Timberview/Texas A&M	Arlington, TX
G	31	Owen Aschieris (W)	6 ft 1 in (1.85 m)	165 lb (75 kg)	So	Santa Fe Christian Schools	San Diego, CA
C	34	Russell Barlow	6 ft 10 in (2.08 m)	235 lb (107 kg)	Fr	Bishop Lynch	Richardson, TX
F	35	Yuat Alok	6 ft 11 in (2.11 m)	225 lb (102 kg)	Jr	Impact Academy/Chipola College	Auckland, New Zealand

Head coach

- Jamie Dixon (TCU)

Assistant coach(es)

- Scott Cross, (UT Arlington)
- Ryan Miller, assistant coach (Northern State)
- Corey Barker (Prairie View A&M)
- Ontario Lett, special assistant to the head coach (Pittsburgh)
- Thomas Montigel, operations coordinator (TCU)
- Corey Santee, graduate assistant
- Chris Jones, graduate assistant
- David Vogel, graduate assistant
- Stephen Gephardt, assistant strength coach
- Matt Herrill, associate director of sports medicine

Legend

- (C) Team captain
- (S) Suspended
- (I) Ineligible
- (W) Walk-on
- Injured
- Current redshirt

Roster

== Schedule and results ==
Date time, TV	Rank^{#}	Opponent^{#}	Result	Record	Site (attendance) city, state
Regular season
November 7, 2018*; 8:00 pm, FSSW+	No. 20	Cal State Bakersfield	W 66–61	1–0	Schollmaier Arena (6,819); Fort Worth, TX
November 11, 2018*; 4:00 pm, FSSW	No. 20	Oral Roberts	W 79–62	2–0	Schollmaier Arena (6,368); Fort Worth, TX
November 15, 2018*; 8:00 pm, FSSW	No. 21	Fresno State	W 77–69	3–0	Schollmaier Arena (6,315); Fort Worth, TX
November 20, 2018*; 7:00 pm, FSSW	No. 18	Lipscomb	L 64–73	3–1	Schollmaier Arena (6,168); Fort Worth, TX
November 26, 2018*; 7:00 pm, FSSW		Eastern Michigan	W 87–69	4–1	Schollmaier Arena (6,219); Fort Worth, TX
November 30, 2018*; 6:30 pm, FSSW		Central Michigan	W 89–62	5–1	Schollmaier Arena (6,802); Fort Worth, TX
December 5, 2018*; 9:00 pm, ESPNU		at SMU	W 67–59	6–1	Moody Coliseum (5,929); Dallas, TX
December 7, 2018*; 8:30 pm, FS1		vs. USC; Basketball Hall of Fame Classic	W 96–61	7–1	Staples Center; Los Angeles, CA
December 16, 2018*; 4:00 pm, ESPNU		Indiana State; Diamond Head Classic campus site game	W 90–70	8–1	Schollmaier Arena (6,431); Fort Worth, TX
December 22, 2018*; 11:30 pm, ESPN3		vs. Charlotte; Diamond Head Classic Quarterfinals	W 82–57	9–1	Stan Sheriff Center; Honolulu, HI
December 23, 2018*; 9:00 pm, ESPN2		vs. Bucknell; Diamond Head Classic Semifinals	W 82–65	10–1	Stan Sheriff Center; Honolulu, HI
December 25, 2018*; 8:00 pm, ESPN2		vs. Indiana State; Diamond Head Classic Championship game	W 83-69	11–1	Stan Sheriff Center; Honolulu, HI
December 28, 2018*; 6:00 pm		at Hawaii Pacific; Exhibition	Cancelled (Note: An exhibition game against Hawaii Pacific scheduled for December 28 was cancelled after a Hawaii Pacific player died earlier in the week after collapsing on the bench during a game on December 18 against Southern Nazarene.)		Neal S. Blaisdell Center; Honolulu, HI
January 5, 2019; 3:00 pm, ESPNU		Baylor; Saturday Showcase	W 85–81	12–1 (1–0)	Schollmaier Arena (6,396); Fort Worth, TX
January 9, 2019; 8:00 pm, ESPN2	No. 25	at No. 7 Kansas; Wednesday Night Hoops	L 68–77	12–2 (1–1)	Allen Fieldhouse (16,300); Lawrence, KS
January 12, 2019; 1:00 pm, FSSW	No. 25	at No. 23 Oklahoma	L 74–76	12–3 (1–2)	Lloyd Noble Center (8,005); Norman, OK
January 15, 2019; 6:00 pm, ESPNU		West Virginia; Super Tuesday	W 98–67	13–3 (2–2)	Schollmaier Arena (6,734); Fort Worth, TX
January 19, 2019; 3:00 pm, ESPN2		at Kansas State; Saturday Showcase	L 55–65	13–4 (2–3)	Bramlage Coliseum (9,809); Manhattan, KS
January 23, 2019; 6:00 pm, ESPNU		Texas	W 65–61	14–4 (3–3)	Schollmaier Arena (7,099); Fort Worth, TX
January 26, 2019*; 11:00 am, ESPN2		Florida; Big 12/SEC Challenge/Saturday Showcase	W 55–50	15–4	Schollmaier Arena (6,682); Fort Worth, TX
January 28, 2019; 8:00 pm, ESPN		at No. 16 Texas Tech; Big Monday	L 65–84	15–5 (3–4)	United Supermarkets Arena (12,736); Lubbock, TX
February 2, 2019; 7:00 pm, ESPNU		at Baylor; Saturday Showcase	L 64-90	15–6 (3–5)	Ferrell Center (7,337); Waco, TX
February 6, 2019; 8:00 pm, ESPNU		Oklahoma State	W 70–68	16–6 (4–5)	Schollmaier Arena (6,505); Fort Worth, TX
February 9, 2019; 1:00 pm, ESPNU		at No. 17 Iowa State; Saturday Showcase	W 92–83	17–6 (5–5)	Hilton Coliseum (14,384); Ames, IA
February 11, 2019; 8:00 pm, ESPN		No. 14 Kansas; Big Monday	L 77–82 ^{OT}	17–7 (5–6)	Schollmaier Arena (7,356); Fort Worth, TX
February 16, 2019; 11:00 am, ESPN2		Oklahoma; Saturday Showcase	L 62–71	17–8 (5–7)	Schollmaier Arena (6,464); Fort Worth, TX
February 18, 2019; 8:00 pm, ESPNU		at Oklahoma State; Big Monday	L 62–71	17–9 (5–8)	Gallagher-Iba Arena (5,900); Stillwater, OK
February 23, 2019; 1:00 pm, ESPN2		No. 19 Iowa State; Saturday Showcase	W 75–72	18–9 (6–8)	Schollmaier Arena (6,315); Fort Worth, TX
February 26, 2019; 6:00 pm, ESPNU		at West Virginia; Super Tuesday	L 96–104 ^{3OT}	18–10 (6–9)	WVU Coliseum (8,798); Morgantown, WV
March 2, 2019; 3:00 pm, ESPN2		No. 11 Texas Tech; Saturday Showcase	L 66–81	18–11 (6–10)	Schollmaier Arena (6,616); Fort Worth, TX
March 4, 2019; 8:00 pm, ESPN2		No. 18 Kansas State; Big Monday	L 52–64	18–12 (6–11)	Schollmaier Arena (6,258); Fort Worth, TX
March 9, 2019; 11:00 am, ESPN2		at Texas; Saturday Showcase	W 69–56	19–12 (7–11)	Frank Erwin Center (9,762); Austin, TX
Big 12 tournament
March 13, 2019; 6:00 pm, ESPNU	(8)	vs. (9) Oklahoma State; First Round	W 73–70	20–12	Sprint Center; Kansas City, MO
March 14, 2019; 1:55 pm, ESPN2	(8)	vs. (1) No. 15 Kansas State; Quarterfinals	L 61–70	20–13	Sprint Center (18,930); Kansas City, MO
NIT tournament
March 20, 2019*; 8:00 pm, ESPN2	(1)	(8) Sam Houston State; First Round – TCU Bracket	W 82–69	21–13	Schollmaier Arena (3,095); Fort Worth, TX
March 24, 2019*; 8:30 pm, ESPNU	(1)	(4) Nebraska; Second Round – TCU Bracket	W 88–72	22–13	Schollmaier Arena (3,445); Fort Worth, TX
March 26, 2019*; 8:00 pm, ESPN	(1)	(2) Creighton; Quarterfinals – TCU Bracket	W 71–58	23–13	Schollmaier Arena (3,314); Fort Worth, TX
April 2, 2019*; 8:00 pm, ESPN	(1)	(2) Texas; Semifinals	L 44–58	23–14	Madison Square Garden (4,599); New York City, NY
*Non-conference game. ^{#}Rankings from AP Poll. (#) Tournament seedings in parentheses. All times are in Central Time.

Schedule Source: GoFrogs.com

== Rankings ==
Ranking movements Legend: ██ Increase in ranking ██ Decrease in ranking — = Not ranked RV = Received votes
	Week																				
Poll	Pre	1	2	3	4	5	6	7	8	9	10	11	12	13	14	15	16	17	18	19	Final
AP	20	21	18	RV	RV	RV	RV	RV	RV	25	RV										
Coaches	21	21^	18	RV	—	RV	RV	RV	RV	RV	RV										

^Coaches did not release a Week 2 poll.
