= 2018 Diamond Head Classic =

College basketball competition

- Season: 2018–19
- Teams: 8
- Finals site: Stan Sheriff Center; Honolulu, Hawaii
- Champions: TCU (1st title)
- Runner-up: Indiana State (1st title game)
- Semifinalists: Bucknell (1st semifinal); UNLV (1st semifinal)
- Winning coach: Jamie Dixon (1st title)
- MVP: Alex Robinson (TCU)

The 2018 Diamond Head Classic was a mid-season eight-team college basketball tournament that was played on December 22, 23, and 25 at the Stan Sheriff Center in Honolulu, Hawaii. It was the tenth annual Diamond Head Classic tournament, and is part of the 2018–19 NCAA Division I men's basketball season.

== Bracket ==
* – Denotes overtime period

=== Campus Site Games ===
December 16
Indiana State	70
TCU	90

=== Championship Round ===
5th Place Game; December 25
Hawai'i	68
Rhode Island	60
7th Place Game; December 25
Colorado	68
Charlotte	53

Consolation 2nd Round; December 23
Colorado	62
Hawai'i	70*
Rhode Island	75
Charlotte	61

First Round; December 22
Indiana State	72
Colorado	67
UNLV	73
Hawai'i	59
Rhode Island	82
Bucknell	84
TCU	82
Charlotte	57

Semifinals; December 23
Indiana State	84
UNLV	79
Bucknell	65
TCU	82

Championship; December 25
Indiana State	69
TCU	83
3rd Place Game; December 25
UNLV	72
Bucknell	97
