= 2019 Big 12 men's basketball tournament =

- Classification: Division I
- Season: 2018–19
- Teams: 10
- Site: Sprint Center; Kansas City, Missouri
- Champions: Iowa State (5th title)
- Winning coach: Steve Prohm (2nd title)
- MVP: Marial Shayok (Iowa State)
- Attendance: 94,847 (overall); 19,066 (championship)
- Top scorer: Dedric Lawson (Kansas) (58 points)
- Television: ESPN, ESPN2, ESPNU

2018–19 Big 12 men's basketball standings
	Conf.				Overall
Team	W		L	PCT	W		L	PCT
No. 19 Kansas State	14	–	4	.778	25	–	9	.735
No. 2 Texas Tech	14	–	4	.778	31	–	7	.816
No. 16 Kansas	12	–	6	.667	26	–	10	.722
Baylor	10	–	8	.556	20	–	14	.588
No. 25 Iowa State †	9	–	9	.500	23	–	12	.657
Texas	8	–	10	.444	21	–	16	.568
Oklahoma	7	–	11	.389	20	–	14	.588
TCU	7	–	11	.389	23	–	14	.622
Oklahoma State	5	–	13	.278	12	–	20	.375
West Virginia	4	–	14	.222	15	–	21	.417
† 2019 Big 12 tournament winner Rankings from AP Poll

The 2019 Phillips 66 Big 12 men's basketball tournament was the postseason men's basketball tournament for the Big 12 Conference. It was played from March 13 to 16, in Kansas City, Missouri at the Sprint Center. No. 5 seed Iowa State defeated Kansas 78–66 to win the championship and receive the Big 12’s automatic bid to the 2019 NCAA tournament. It was Iowa State's fourth Big 12 title in the last six years. They also became the first team lower than a four seed to win the tournament.

== Seeding ==
The Tournament consisted of a 10 team single-elimination tournament with the top 6 seeds receiving a bye. Teams were seeded by record within the conference, with a tiebreaker system to seed teams with identical conference records.

2019 Big 12 Men's Basketball Tournament seeds
Seed	School	Conf.	Over.	Tiebreaker
1	Kansas State ‡#	14–4	25–9	1–1 vs. Texas Tech / 1–1 vs. Kansas / 2–0 vs Baylor
2	Texas Tech c#	14–4	31–7	1–1 vs. Kansas State / 1–1 vs. Kansas / 1–1 vs Baylor
3	Kansas #	12–6	26–10	
4	Baylor #	10–8	20–14	
5	Iowa State #	9–9	23–12	
6	Texas #	8–10	21–16	
7	Oklahoma	7–11	20–14	2–0 vs. TCU
8	TCU	7–11	23–14	0–2 vs. Oklahoma
9	Oklahoma State	5–13	12–20	
10	West Virginia	4–14	15–21	
‡ – Big 12 Conference regular season champions, and tournament No. 1 seed. c – Big 12 Conference regular season co-champion, not tournament No. 1 seed. # – Received a single-bye in the conference tournament. Overall records include all games played in the Big 12 Conference tournament.

== Schedule ==
Session	Game	Time	Matchup	Television	Attendance
First Round – Wednesday, March 13
1	1	6:00 pm	No. 8 TCU 73 vs No. 9 Oklahoma State 70	ESPNU	18,858
1	2	8:00 pm	No. 10 West Virginia 72 vs No. 7 Oklahoma 71	ESPNU	18,858
Quarterfinals – Thursday, March 14
2	3	11:30 am	No. 5 Iowa State 83 vs No. 4 Baylor 66	ESPN2	18,930
2	4	2:00 pm	No. 1 Kansas State 70 vs No. 8 TCU 61	ESPN2	18,930
3	5	6:00 pm	No. 10 West Virginia 79 vs No. 2 Texas Tech 74	ESPN2	18,927
3	6	8:30 pm	No. 3 Kansas 65 vs No. 6 Texas 57	ESPN2	18,927
Semifinals – Friday, March 15
4	7	6:00 pm	No. 5 Iowa State 63 vs No. 1 Kansas State 59	ESPN2	19,066
4	8	8:30 pm	No. 3 Kansas 88 vs No. 10 West Virginia 74	ESPN2	19,066
Championship – Saturday, March 16
5	9	5:00 pm	No. 5 Iowa State 78 vs No. 3 Kansas 66	ESPN	19,066
Game times in CT. #-Rankings denote tournament seed

== Bracket ==
First round Wednesday, March 13
8	TCU	73
9	Oklahoma State	70
7	Oklahoma	71
10	West Virginia	72

Quarterfinals; Thursday, March 14
1	Kansas State	70
8	TCU	61
4	Baylor	66
5	Iowa State	83
2	Texas Tech	74
10	West Virginia	79
3	Kansas	65
6	Texas	57

Semifinals; Friday, March 15
1	Kansas State	59
5	Iowa State	63
10	West Virginia	74
3	Kansas	88

Championship; Saturday, March 16
5	Iowa State	78
3	Kansas	66

== All-Tournament Team ==
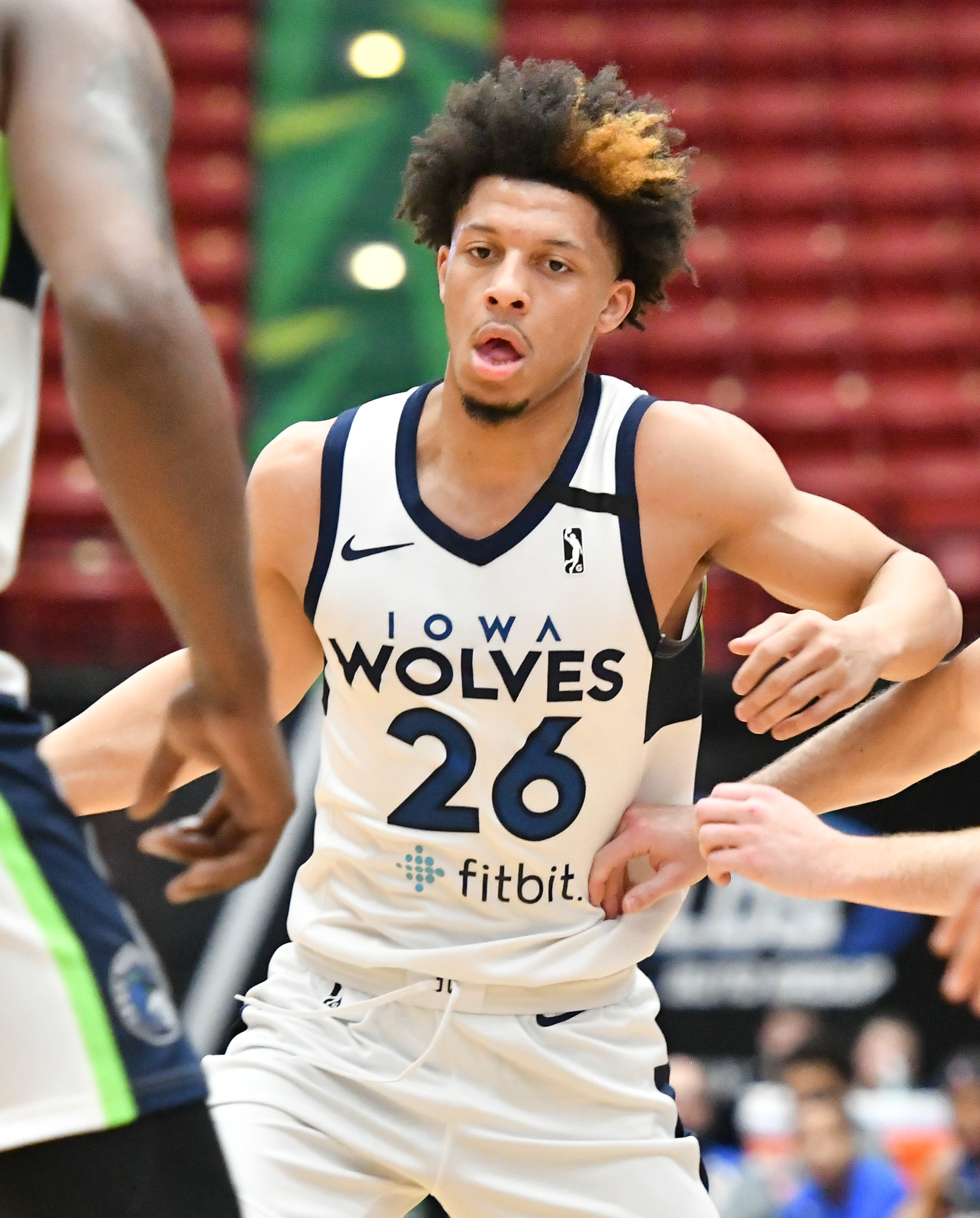
Lindell Wigginton

'Most Outstanding Player – Marial Shayok, Iowa State

Player	Team	Position	Class
Marial Shayok	Iowa State	0	0
Michael Jacobson	Iowa State	0	0
Lindell Wigginton	Iowa State	0	0
Devon Dotson	Kansas	0	0
Dedric Lawson	Kansas	0	0

== See also ==
- 2019 Big 12 Conference women's basketball tournament
- 2019 NCAA Division I men's basketball tournament
- 2018–19 NCAA Division I men's basketball rankings
