= 2018–19 Oklahoma State Cowboys basketball team =

American college basketball season

2018–19 Oklahoma State Cowboys basketball
- Conference: Big 12 Conference
- Record: 12–20 (5–13 Big 12)
- Head coach: Mike Boynton Jr. (2nd season)
- Assistant coaches: John Cooper; David Kontaxis; Scott Sutton
- Home arena: Gallagher-Iba Arena

2018–19 Big 12 men's basketball standings
	Conf.				Overall
Team	W		L	PCT	W		L	PCT
No. 19 Kansas State	14	–	4	.778	25	–	9	.735
No. 2 Texas Tech	14	–	4	.778	31	–	7	.816
No. 16 Kansas	12	–	6	.667	26	–	10	.722
Baylor	10	–	8	.556	20	–	14	.588
No. 25 Iowa State †	9	–	9	.500	23	–	12	.657
Texas	8	–	10	.444	21	–	16	.568
Oklahoma	7	–	11	.389	20	–	14	.588
TCU	7	–	11	.389	23	–	14	.622
Oklahoma State	5	–	13	.278	12	–	20	.375
West Virginia	4	–	14	.222	15	–	21	.417
† 2019 Big 12 tournament winner Rankings from AP Poll

The 2018–19 Oklahoma State Cowboys basketball team represented Oklahoma State University in the 2018–19 NCAA Division I men's basketball season. They were led by second-head coach Mike Boynton Jr. The Cowboys were members of the Big 12 Conference and played their home games at Gallagher-Iba Arena in Stillwater, Oklahoma.

== Previous season ==
The Cowboys finished the 2017–18 season with 21–15, 8–10 in Big 12 play to finish in a four-way tie for sixth place. They defeated Oklahoma in the first round of the Big 12 tournament before losing in the quarterfinals to Kansas. They were invited to the National Invitation Tournament where they defeated Florida Gulf Coast and Stanford before losing in the quarterfinals to Western Kentucky.

== Departures ==
Name	Number	Pos.	Height	Weight	Year	Hometown	Reason for departure
Brandon Averette	0	G	5'11"	185	Sophomore	Richardson, TX	Transferred to Utah Valley
Kendall Smith	1	G	6'3"	190	RS Senior	Antioch, CA	Graduated
Zach Dawson	2	G	6'3"	185	Freshman	Miami, FL	Dismissed from team
Travarius Shine	5	G/F	6'6"	200	RS Junior	Irving, TX	Signed to professional team
Lucas N'Guessan	14	F/C	7'0"	220	Sophomore	De Lier, Netherlands	Transferred to East Tennessee State
Davon Dillard	24	G/F	6'5"	215	Junior	Gary, IN	Dismissed from team
Jeffrey Carroll	30	G/F	6'6"	220	RS Senior	Rowlett, TX	Graduated
Yankuba Sima	35	F/C	6'11"	225	RS Junior	Girona, Spain	Signed to professional team
Mitchell Solomon	41	F	6'9"	250	Senior	Bixby, OK	Graduated

=== Incoming transfers ===
Name	Number	Pos.	Height	Weight	Year	Hometown	Previous school
Curtis Jones	1	G	6'4"	175	Junior	Richmond, VA	Indiana
Mike Cunningham	55	G	6'0"	185	RS Senior	Washington, D.C.	USC Upstate

== Recruits ==
College recruiting information
Name	Hometown	School	Height	Weight	Commit date
Kentrevious Jones #46 C	Macon, GA	Quality Education Academy	6 ft 11 in (2.11 m)	210 lb (95 kg)	Apr 5, 2018
Kentrevious Jones #46 C	Recruit ratings: Scout: Rivals: 247Sports: (75)				
Duncan Demuth; PF	Seminole, FL	Seminole HS	6 ft 8 in (2.03 m)	215 lb (98 kg)	Oct 22, 2017
Duncan Demuth; PF	Recruit ratings: Scout: Rivals: 247Sports: ESPN:				
Yor Anei; PF	Lenexa, KS	Lee's Summit West HS	6 ft 9 in (2.06 m)	205 lb (93 kg)	Oct 26, 2017
Yor Anei; PF	Recruit ratings: Scout: Rivals: 247Sports: ESPN:				
Isaac Likekele; PG	Arlington, TX	Mansfield Timberview HS	6 ft 4 in (1.93 m)	205 lb (93 kg)	Sep 10, 2017
Isaac Likekele; PG	Recruit ratings: Scout: Rivals: 247Sports: (NR)				
Maurice Calloo; PF	Windsor, ON	Oak Hill Academy	6 ft 8 in (2.03 m)	210 lb (95 kg)	May 10, 2018
Maurice Calloo; PF	Recruit ratings: Scout: Rivals: 247Sports: (NR)				
Overall recruit ranking:
Note: In many cases, Scout, Rivals, 247Sports, On3, and ESPN may conflict in their listings of height and weight.; In these cases, the average was taken. ESPN grades are on a 100-point scale.; Sources: "2018 Team Ranking". Rivals.

== Future recruits ==
=== 2019–20 team recruits ===
College recruiting information (2019)
Name	Hometown	School	Height	Weight	Commit date
Kalib Boone #23 PF	Tulsa, OK	Memorial High School	6 ft 8 in (2.03 m)	210 lb (95 kg)	Apr 16, 2018
Kalib Boone #23 PF	Recruit ratings: Scout: Rivals: 247Sports: ESPN:				
Keylan Boone; PF	Tulsa, OK	Memorial High School	6 ft 7 in (2.01 m)	195 lb (88 kg)	Apr 16, 2018
Keylan Boone; PF	Recruit ratings: Scout: Rivals: 247Sports: ESPN:				
Overall recruit ranking:
Note: In many cases, Scout, Rivals, 247Sports, On3, and ESPN may conflict in their listings of height and weight.; In these cases, the average was taken. ESPN grades are on a 100-point scale.; Sources: "2019 Team Ranking". Rivals.

== Roster ==
2018–19 Oklahoma State Cowboys men's basketball team
Players
Coaches

Pos.	#	Name	Height	Weight	Year	Previous school	Hometown
G	1	Curtis Jones	6 ft 4 in (1.93 m)	185 lb (84 kg)	Jr	Huntington Prep; Indiana	Richmond, VA
G	4	Thomas Dziagwa	6 ft 4 in (1.93 m)	180 lb (82 kg)	Jr	Tampa Catholic	Tampa, FL
F	5	Duncan Demuth	6 ft 8 in (2.03 m)	195 lb (88 kg)	Fr	Seminole	Seminole, FL
F	12	Cameron McGriff	6 ft 7 in (2.01 m)	220 lb (100 kg)	Jr	South Grand Prairie	Grand Prairie, TX
G	13	Isaac Likekele	6 ft 4 in (1.93 m)	210 lb (95 kg)	Fr	Timberview	Mansfield, TX
F	14	Yor Anei	6 ft 10 in (2.08 m)	225 lb (102 kg)	Fr	Lee's Summit	Overland Park, KS
G	21	Lindy Waters III	6 ft 6 in (1.98 m)	210 lb (95 kg)	Jr	Norman North	Norman, OK
G	24	Luke Major (W)	6 ft 7 in (2.01 m)	200 lb (91 kg)	Fr	Homeschool	Edmond, OK
G	31	Dee Mitchell (W)	6 ft 2 in (1.88 m)	190 lb (86 kg)	Fr	Jefferson	Jefferson, TX
F	33	Trey Reeves	6 ft 4 in (1.93 m)	220 lb (100 kg)	Jr	Muldrow	Gans, OK
G	35	Tanner Taylor (W)	6 ft 1 in (1.85 m)	170 lb (77 kg)	Jr	Emporia	Emporia, KS
F	40	Cade Wagner (W)	6 ft 6 in (1.98 m)	185 lb (84 kg)	Fr	Highland Park	Dallas, TX
G	44	Gabe Simpson (W)	6 ft 3 in (1.91 m)	208 lb (94 kg)	Fr	Jay	Jay, OK
G	54	J.K. Hadlock (W)	6 ft 3 in (1.91 m)	185 lb (84 kg)	Jr	Glencoe	Fairfax, OK

Head coach

- Mike Boynton, Jr. (South Carolina)

Assistant coach(es)

- John Cooper (Wichita State)
- David Kontaxis (South Florida)
- Scott Sutton (Oklahoma State)

Legend

- (C) Team captain
- (S) Suspended
- (I) Ineligible
- (W) Walk-on
- Injured
- Current redshirt

Roster

== Schedule and results ==
Date time, TV	Rank^{#}	Opponent^{#}	Result	Record	Site (attendance) city, state
Exhibition
Nov 4, 2018*; 2:00 pm, FSOK		Ouachita Baptist	W 80–59	–	Gallagher-Iba Arena (5,432); Stillwater, OK
Regular season
Nov 10, 2018*; 3:00 pm, ESPN+		at Charlotte	L 64–66	0–1	Dale F. Halton Arena (3,895); Charlotte, NC
Nov 14, 2018*; 7:00 pm, FSOK+		UTSA	W 82–60	1–1	Gallagher-Iba Arena (6,571); Stillwater, OK
Nov 18, 2018*; 3:00 pm, FSOK		College of Charleston; AdvoCare Invitational non-bracket game	W 70–58	2–1	Gallagher-Iba Arena (6,595); Stillwater, OK
Nov 22, 2018*; 2:30 pm, ESPN2		vs. Memphis; AdvoCare Invitational quarterfinals	W 84–64	3–1	HP Field House (2,964); Lake Buena Vista, FL
Nov 23, 2018*; 10:30 am, ESPN		vs. Villanova; AdvoCare Invitational	L 58–77	3–2	HP Field House; Lake Buena Vista, FL
Nov 25, 2018*; 3:00pm, ESPN2		vs. No. 19 LSU; AdvoCare Invitational	W 90–77	4–2	HP Field House; Lake Buena Vista, FL
Nov 30, 2018*; 9:00 pm, BTN		vs. Minnesota; U.S. Bank Stadium Classic	L 76–83	4-3	U.S. Bank Stadium (12,357); Minneapolis, MN
Dec 5, 2018*; 7:00 pm, CBSSN		at Tulsa	L 71–74	4–4	Reynolds Center (7,145); Tulsa, OK
Dec 8, 2018*; 3:00 pm, FSOK		Houston	L 53–63	4–5	Gallagher-Iba Arena (6,596); Stillwater, OK
Dec 16, 2018*; 6:00 pm, BTN		vs. Nebraska; Sioux Falls Showcase	L 56–79	4–6	Sanford Pentagon (3,800); Sioux Falls, SD
Dec 21, 2018*; 12:00 pm, FSOK		Central Arkansas	W 82–73	5–6	Gallagher-Iba Arena (5,806); Stillwater, OK
Dec 29, 2018*; 1:00 pm, FSOK		Texas–A&M Corpus Christi	W 69–59	6–6	Gallagher-Iba Arena (6,745); Stillwater, OK
Jan 2, 2019; 8:00 pm, ESPNews		Iowa State	L 63–69	6–7 (0–1)	Gallagher-Iba Arena (6,523); Stillwater, OK
Jan 5, 2019; 1:00 pm, FSSW		at No. 23 Oklahoma; Bedlam Series	L 64–74	6–8 (0–2)	Lloyd Noble Center (10,906); Norman, OK
Jan 8, 2019; 6:00 pm, ESPNU		Texas; Super Tuesday	W 61–58	7–8 (1–2)	Gallagher-Iba Arena (6,486); Stillwater, OK
Jan 12, 2019; 11:00 am, ESPNU		at West Virginia; Saturday Showcase	W 85–77	8–8 (2–2)	WVU Coliseum (11,339); Morgantown, WV
Jan 14, 2019; 8:00 pm, ESPNU		Baylor; Big Monday	L 69–73	8–9 (2–3)	Gallagher-Iba Arena (8,194); Stillwater, OK
Jan 19, 2019; 5:00 pm, ESPNU		at Iowa State; Saturday Showcase	L 59–72	8–10 (2–4)	Hilton Coliseum (14,384); Ames, IA
Jan 23, 2019; 8:00 pm, ESPNU		Oklahoma; Bedlam Series	L 61–70	8–11 (2–5)	Gallagher-Iba Arena (11,086); Stillwater, OK
Jan 26, 2019*; 1:00 pm, ESPNU		South Carolina; Big 12/SEC Challenge/Saturday Showcase	W 74–70	9–11	Gallagher-Iba Arena (7,658); Stillwater, OK
Feb 2, 2019; 5:00 pm, ESPNU		Kansas State; Saturday Showcase	L 57–75	9–12 (2–6)	Gallagher-Iba Arena (8,457); Stillwater, OK
Feb 6, 2019; 8:00 pm, ESPNU		at TCU	L 68–70	9–13 (2–7)	Schollmaier Arena (6,505); Fort Worth, TX
Feb 9, 2019; 11:00 am, ESPN		at No. 13 Kansas; Saturday Showcase	L 72–84	9–14 (2–8)	Allen Fieldhouse (16,300); Lawrence, KS
Feb 13, 2019; 8:00 pm, ESPN2		No. 15 Texas Tech; Wednesday Night Hoops	L 50–78	9–15 (2–9)	Gallagher-Iba Arena (6,155); Stillwater, OK
Feb 16, 2019; 12:00 pm, CBS		at Texas	L 57–69	9–16 (2–10)	Frank Erwin Center (10,406); Austin, TX
Feb 18, 2019; 8:00 pm, ESPNU		TCU; Big Monday	W 68–61	10–16 (3–10)	Gallagher-Iba Arena (5,900); Stillwater, OK
Feb 23, 2019; 3:00 pm, ESPN2		at No. 23 Kansas State; Saturday Showcase/Rivalry Week	L 46–85	10–17 (3–11)	Bramlage Coliseum (10,699); Manhattan, KS
Feb 27, 2019; 6:00 pm, ESPNU		at No. 11 Texas Tech	L 80–84 ^{OT}	10–18 (3–12)	United Supermarkets Arena (12,248); Lubbock, TX
Mar 2, 2019; 11:00 am, CBS		No. 15 Kansas	L 67–72	10–19 (3–13)	Gallagher-Iba Arena (9,335); Stillwater, OK
Mar 6, 2019; 8:00 pm, ESPN2		at Baylor; Wednesday Night Hoops	W 67–64	11–19 (4–13)	Ferrell Center (5,041); Waco, TX
Mar 9, 2019; 3:00 pm, ESPNews		West Virginia; Saturday Showcase	W 85–77	12–19 (5–13)	Gallagher-Iba Arena (7,279); Stillwater, OK
Big 12 tournament
Mar 13, 2019; 6:00 pm, ESPNU	(9)	vs. (8) TCU; First round	L 70–73	12–20	Sprint Center; Kansas City, MO
*Non-conference game. ^{#}Rankings from AP Poll. (#) Tournament seedings in parentheses. All times are in Central Time.
