= 2018–19 Kansas Jayhawks men's basketball team =

American college basketball season

2018–19 Kansas Jayhawks men's basketball

NIT Season Tip-Off champions

NCAA tournament, Second Round
- Conference: Big 12 Conference

Ranking
- Coaches: No. 16
- AP: No. 17
- Record: 26–10 (12–6 Big 12)
- Head coach: Bill Self (16th season)
- Assistant coaches: Jerrance Howard (6th season); Norm Roberts (8th season); Kurtis Townsend (15th season)
- Home arena: Allen Fieldhouse

2018–19 Big 12 men's basketball standings
	Conf.				Overall
Team	W		L	PCT	W		L	PCT
No. 19 Kansas State	14	–	4	.778	25	–	9	.735
No. 2 Texas Tech	14	–	4	.778	31	–	7	.816
No. 16 Kansas	12	–	6	.667	26	–	10	.722
Baylor	10	–	8	.556	20	–	14	.588
No. 25 Iowa State †	9	–	9	.500	23	–	12	.657
Texas	8	–	10	.444	21	–	16	.568
Oklahoma	7	–	11	.389	20	–	14	.588
TCU	7	–	11	.389	23	–	14	.622
Oklahoma State	5	–	13	.278	12	–	20	.375
West Virginia	4	–	14	.222	15	–	21	.417
† 2019 Big 12 tournament winner Rankings from AP Poll

The 2018–19 Kansas Jayhawks men's basketball team represented the University of Kansas in the 2018–19 NCAA Division I men's basketball season, which was the Jayhawks' 121st basketball season. The Jayhawks, members of the Big 12 Conference, played their home games at Allen Fieldhouse in Lawrence, Kansas. They were led by 16th year Hall of Fame head coach Bill Self.

== Season notes ==
The Jayhawks entered the season with high expectations due to returning All-Big 12 players Udoka Azubuike and LaGerald Vick, adding three 2018 McDonald's All-Americans, and several transfers coming off their redshirt years. Following the 2017–18 season, several sports websites ranked Kansas 1st on their "Way too early rankings" which preview the next season. The Jayhawks also entered the season ranked number 1 in the AP Poll. Despite the high expectations, the team dealt with adversity during the season as four different players that were expected to be starters missed time. Silvio De Sousa was declared ineligible by the NCAA, Udoka Azubuike underwent season ending surgery in January, Marcus Garrett missed five games due to injury, and LaGerald Vick took a leave absence in February to handle personal issues and eventually announced he wouldn't return. On February 23, 2019, the Jayhawks lost to Texas Tech 91–62. The loss was the Jayhawks worst conference loss under Bill Self and worst conference loss since the 1999–2000 season when they lost to Oklahoma State 86–53. Following a 81–68 loss to Oklahoma on March 5, the Jayhawks were eliminated from Big 12 regular season title contention, ending their NCAA record streak of 14 consecutive titles.

== Roster and coaching staff changes ==
=== Graduation ===
Below are players who graduated from the University of Kansas without any college eligibility left.

Name	Position
Devonte Graham	G
Sviatoslav Mykhailiuk	G
Clay Young	G

=== Early draft entrants ===
==== Hired agent ====
Players that hire an agent after declaring for the NBA draft automatically forfeit any remaining college eligibility. Below are any players that declared for the draft and hired an agent and will not be returning.

Name	Position	Class
Malik Newman	G	RS Sophomore

==== Did not hire agent ====
Players who do not hire an agent can return to their college as long as they withdraw from the draft no more than 10 days after the final day of the NBA draft Combine, which made May 31 the final date to withdraw from the 2018 Draft. The following players entered the draft without initially hiring an agent. Also included is their final decision to either return to Kansas or if they hired an agent and stayed in the draft.

Name	Position	Class*	Returned/ Entered draft
LaGerald Vick	G	Junior	Returned
Udoka Azubuike	C	Sophomore	Returned

*Players class for the 2017–18 season

=== Transfers ===
==== Outgoing ====
Name	Position	Class	New School
Sam Cunliffe	G	Junior	Evansville

=== Left team for other reasons ===
Name	Position	Class	Reason
James Sosinki	F	Sophomore	Walk on, not invited back

=== Left team during season ===
Name	Position	Class	Date left	Games played	Reason
LaGerald Vick	G	Senior	February 7	23	Undisclosed personal reasons

=== Incoming freshmen ===
==== Recruiting class ====
College recruiting information
Name	Hometown	School	Height	Weight	Commit date
Quentin Grimes; SG	The Woodlands, TX	College Park	6 ft 5 in (1.96 m)	200 lb (91 kg)	Nov 15, 2017
Quentin Grimes; SG	Recruit ratings: Scout: Rivals: 247Sports: ESPN: (94)				
Devon Dotson; PG	Charlotte, NC	Providence Day School	6 ft 2 in (1.88 m)	180 lb (82 kg)	Oct 13, 2017
Devon Dotson; PG	Recruit ratings: Scout: Rivals: 247Sports: ESPN: (90)				
David McCormack; C	Norfolk, VA	Oak Hill Academy	6 ft 9 in (2.06 m)	255 lb (116 kg)	Sep 24, 2017
David McCormack; C	Recruit ratings: Scout: Rivals: 247Sports: ESPN: (89)				
Ochai Agbaji; SG	Kansas City, MO	Oak Park	6 ft 5.5 in (1.97 m)	195 lb (88 kg)	Feb 8, 2018
Ochai Agbaji; SG	Recruit ratings: Scout: Rivals: 247Sports: ESPN: (78)				
Overall recruiting rankings: Scout: 5 Rivals: 5 247 Sports: 5 ESPN: 6

==== Walk–ons ====
Name	Position	Hometown	High school
Elijah Elliott	G	Southlake, Texas	Southlake Carroll
Garrett Luinstra	G	Lawrence, Kansas	Lawrence Free State

== Roster ==
2018–19 Kansas Jayhawks men's basketball team
Players
Coaches

Pos.	#	Name	Height	Weight	Year	Hometown
G	0	Marcus Garrett	6 ft 5 in (1.96 m)	195 lb (88 kg)	So	Dallas, TX
F	1	Dedric Lawson	6 ft 9 in (2.06 m)	235 lb (107 kg)	RS Jr	Memphis, TN
G	2	Charlie Moore	5 ft 11 in (1.8 m)	180 lb (82 kg)	RS So	Chicago, IL
G	5	Quentin Grimes	6 ft 5 in (1.96 m)	210 lb (95 kg)	Fr	The Woodlands, TX
G	10	Elijah Elliott (W) (redshirt)	6 ft 3 in (1.91 m)	185 lb (84 kg)	Fr	Southlake, TX
G	11	Devon Dotson	6 ft 2 in (1.88 m)	185 lb (84 kg)	Fr	Charlotte, NC
G	12	Chris Teahan	6 ft 4 in (1.93 m)	195 lb (88 kg)	So	Leawood, KS
F	13	K. J. Lawson	6 ft 8 in (2.03 m)	210 lb (95 kg)	RS So	Memphis, TN
G	20	Garrett Luinstra (W)	6 ft 2 in (1.88 m)	155 lb (70 kg)	Fr	Lawrence, KS
F	22	Silvio De Sousa (I)	6 ft 9 in (2.06 m)	245 lb (111 kg)	So	Luanda, Angola
G	30	Ochai Agbaji	6 ft 5 in (1.96 m)	210 lb (95 kg)	Fr	Kansas City, MO
C	33	David McCormack	6 ft 10 in (2.08 m)	265 lb (120 kg)	Fr	Norfolk, VA
C	35	Udoka Azubuike (injured)	7 ft 0 in (2.13 m)	270 lb (122 kg)	Jr	Delta, Nigeria
F	44	Mitch Lightfoot	6 ft 8 in (2.03 m)	225 lb (102 kg)	Jr	Gilbert, AZ

Head coach

- Bill Self (Oklahoma State)

Assistant coach(es)

- Norm Roberts (Queens (NY))
- Kurtis Townsend (Western Kentucky)
- Jerrance Howard (Illinois)

Legend

- (C) Team captain
- (S) Suspended
- (I) Ineligible
- (W) Walk-on
- Injured
- Current redshirt

Roster
Last update: March 11, 2018

== Schedule and results ==
Date time, TV	Rank^{#}	Opponent^{#}	Result	Record	High points	High rebounds	High assists	Site (attendance) city, state
Exhibition
October 25, 2018*; 7:00 pm, JTV/ESPN+	No. 1	Emporia State	W 93–55	–	31 – D. Lawson	15 – D. Lawson	5 – Vick	Allen Fieldhouse (16,300); Lawrence, KS
November 1, 2018*; 7:00 pm, JTV/ESPN+	No. 1	Washburn	W 79–52	–	18 – D. Lawson	8 – Grimes	5 – Garrett	Allen Fieldhouse (16,300); Lawrence, KS
Regular Season
November 6, 2018*; 6:00 pm, ESPN	No. 1	vs. No. 10 Michigan State; Champions Classic	W 92–87	1–0	21 – Grimes	14 – D. Lawson	6 – D. Lawson	Bankers Life Fieldhouse (18,907); Indianapolis, IN
November 12, 2018*; 8:00 pm, ESPN2	No. 2	Vermont; NIT Season Tip-Off campus game	W 84–68	2–0	32 – Vick	11 – Azubuike	10 – Grimes	Allen Fieldhouse (16,300); Lawrence, KS
November 16, 2018*; 7:00 pm, JTV/ESPN+	No. 2	Louisiana; NIT Season Tip-Off campus game	W 89–76	3–0	33 – Vick	9 – Vick	5 – Garrett	Allen Fieldhouse (16,300); Lawrence, KS
November 21, 2018*; 6:00 pm, ESPN2	No. 2	vs. Marquette; NIT Season Tip-Off	W 77–68	4–0	26 – D. Lawson	12 – D. Lawson	4 – Dotson	Barclays Center (4,981); Brooklyn, NY
November 23, 2018*; 8:00 pm, ESPN2	No. 2	vs. No. 5 Tennessee; NIT Season Tip-Off Championship	W 87–81 ^{OT}	5–0	24 – D. Lawson	13 – D. Lawson	5 – D. Lawson	Barclays Center (5,491); Brooklyn, NY
December 1, 2018*; 4:30 pm, ESPN	No. 2	Stanford	W 90–84 ^{OT}	6–0	27 – Vick	15 – D. Lawson	4 – Dotson	Allen Fieldhouse (16,300); Lawrence, KS
December 4, 2018*; 7:00 pm, JTV/ESPN+	No. 2	Wofford	W 72–47	7–0	20 – D. Lawson	8 – D. Lawson	3 – Dotson	Allen Fieldhouse (16,300); Lawrence, KS
December 8, 2018*; 7:30 pm, ESPN2	No. 2	New Mexico State; Jayhawk Shootout	W 63–60	8–0	20 – D. Lawson	10 – D. Lawson	5 – Vick	Sprint Center† (15,210); Kansas City, MO
December 15, 2018*; 11:00 am, ESPN	No. 1	No. 17 Villanova	W 74–71	9–0	29 – Vick	12 – D. Lawson	3 – Garrett	Allen Fieldhouse (16,300); Lawrence, KS
December 18, 2018*; 7:00 pm, JTV/ESPN+	No. 1	South Dakota	W 89–53	10–0	18 – Moore	14 – Lawson	6 – Dotson	Allen Fieldhouse (16,300); Lawrence, KS
December 22, 2018*; 8:00 pm, ESPN2	No. 1	at No. 18 Arizona State	L 76–80	10–1	30 – D. Lawson	14 – D. Lawson	5 – Dotson	Wells Fargo Arena (14,593); Tempe, AZ
December 29, 2018*; 1:00 pm, JTV/ESPN+	No. 5	Eastern Michigan	W 87–63	11–1	23 – Azubuike	9 – Azubuike	5 – Lawson	Allen Fieldhouse (16,300); Lawrence, KS
January 2, 2019; 8:00 pm, ESPN2	No. 5	No. 23 Oklahoma	W 70–63	12–1 (1–0)	16 – Dotson	15 – D. Lawson	5 – Garrett	Allen Fieldhouse (16,300); Lawrence, KS
January 5, 2019; 4:00 pm, ESPN2	No. 5	at Iowa State	L 60–77	12–2 (1–1)	19 – Grimes	12 – D. Lawson	3 – Tied	Hilton Coliseum (14,384); Ames, IA
January 9, 2019; 8:00 pm, ESPN2	No. 7	No. 25 TCU	W 77–68	13–2 (2–1)	31 – D. Lawson	14 – D. Lawson	4 – Vick	Allen Fieldhouse (16,300); Lawrence, KS
January 12, 2019; 3:00 pm, ESPN	No. 7	at Baylor	W 73–68	14–2 (3–1)	18 – Vick	6 – Grimes	5 – Dotson	Ferrell Center (9,091); Waco, TX
January 14, 2019; 8:00 pm, ESPN	No. 7	Texas	W 80–78	15–2 (4–1)	21 – Vick	8 – D. Lawson	5 – Dotson	Allen Fieldhouse (16,300); Lawrence, KS
January 19, 2019; 1:00 pm, ESPN	No. 7	at West Virginia	L 64–65	15–3 (4–2)	15 – Tied	11 – D. Lawson	3 – Garrett	WVU Coliseum (12,657); Morgantown, WV
January 21, 2019; 8:00 pm, ESPN	No. 9	No. 24 Iowa State	W 80–76	16–3 (5–2)	29 – D. Lawson	15 – D. Lawson	8 – Dotson	Allen Fieldhouse (16,300); Lawrence, KS
January 26, 2019*; 5:00 pm, ESPN	No. 9	at No. 8 Kentucky; Big 12/SEC Challenge	L 63–71	16–4	20 – D. Lawson	15 – D. Lawson	4 – Dotson	Rupp Arena (24,387); Lexington, KY
January 29, 2019; 6:00 pm, ESPN	No. 11	at Texas	L 63–73	16–5 (5–3)	24 – Agbaji	7 – Tied	4 – Dotson	Frank Erwin Center (11,934); Austin, TX
February 2, 2019; 3:00 pm, CBS	No. 11	No. 16 Texas Tech	W 79–63	17–5 (6–3)	25 – D. Lawson	10 – Tied	6 – Moore	Allen Fieldhouse (16,300); Lawrence, KS
February 5, 2019; 8:00 pm, ESPN	No. 13	at Kansas State; Sunflower Showdown	L 67–74	17–6 (6–4)	18 – D. Lawson	9 – D. Lawson	5 – Dotson	Bramlage Coliseum (12,528); Manhattan, KS
February 9, 2019; 11:00 am, ESPN	No. 13	Oklahoma State	W 84–72	18–6 (7–4)	25 – D. Lawson	9 – Lightfoot	5 – D. Lawson	Allen Fieldhouse (16,300); Lawrence, KS
February 11, 2019; 8:00 pm, ESPN	No. 14	at TCU	W 82–77 ^{OT}	19–6 (8–4)	25 – Dotson	11 – Agbaji	5 – Dotson	Schollmaier Arena (7,356); Ft. Worth, TX
February 16, 2019; 3:00 pm, ESPN	No. 14	West Virginia	W 78–53	20–6 (9–4)	15 – Tied	7 – Lightfoot	8 – Dotson	Allen Fieldhouse (16,300); Lawrence, KS
February 23, 2019; 7:00 pm, ESPN	No. 12	at No. 14 Texas Tech	L 62–91	20–7 (9–5)	14 – D. Lawson	15 – D. Lawson	3 – Grimes	United Supermarkets Arena (15,098); Lubbock, TX
February 25, 2019; 8:00 pm, ESPN	No. 15	No. 16 Kansas State; Sunflower Showdown	W 64–49	21–7 (10–5)	18 – D. Lawson	14 – D. Lawson	5 – D. Lawson	Allen Fieldhouse (16,300); Lawrence, KS
March 2, 2019; 11:00 am, CBS	No. 15	at Oklahoma State	W 72–67	22–7 (11–5)	20 – D. Lawson	15 – D. Lawson	4 – Dotson	Gallagher-Iba Arena (9,335); Stillwater, OK
March 5, 2019; 8:00 pm, ESPN2	No. 13	at Oklahoma	L 68–81	22–8 (11–6)	18 – D. Lawson	11 – D. Lawson	4 – Dotson	Lloyd Noble Center (9,839); Norman, OK
March 9, 2019; 1:00 pm, ESPN	No. 13	Baylor	W 78–70	23–8 (12–6)	23 – D. Lawson	14 – D. Lawson	5 – Grimes	Allen Fieldhouse (16,300); Lawrence, KS
Big 12 Tournament
March 14, 2019; 8:30 pm, ESPN2	(3) No. 17	vs. (6) Texas; Quarterfinals	W 65–57	24–8	17 – Dotson	9 – McCormack	4 – Dotson	Sprint Center (18,927); Kansas City, MO
March 15, 2019; 8:30 pm, ESPN2	(3) No. 17	vs. (10) West Virginia; Semifinals	W 88–74	25–8	24 – D. Lawson	8 – Tied	6 – Dotson	Sprint Center (19,066); Kansas City, MO
March 16, 2019; 5:00 pm, ESPN	(3) No. 17	vs. (5) Iowa State; Championship	L 66–78	25–9	18 – D. Lawson	15 – Garrett	4 – Garrett	Sprint Center (19,066); Kansas City, MO
NCAA Tournament
March 21, 2019*; 3:00 pm, TNT	(4 MW) No. 17	vs. (13 MW) Northeastern; First Round	W 87–53	26–9	25 – D. Lawson	11 – D. Lawson	3 – Grimes	Vivint Smart Home Arena (16,576); Salt Lake City, UT
March 23, 2019*; 8:40 pm, TNT	(4 MW) No. 17	vs. (5 MW) No. 14 Auburn; Second Round	L 75–89	26–10	25 – D. Lawson	10 – D. Lawson	3 – D. Lawson	Vivint Smart Home Arena (17,792); Salt Lake City, UT
*Non-conference game. ^{#}Rankings from AP Poll. (#) Tournament seedings in parentheses. MW=Midwest. All times are in Central Time.

†While the Jayhawks primary home arena is Allen Fieldhouse, they do play one game a year at the Sprint Center in Kansas City. These games are officially considered home games

== Rankings ==
Ranking movements Legend: ██ Increase in ranking ██ Decrease in ranking ( ) = First-place votes
	Week																				
Poll	Pre	1	2	3	4	5	6	7	8	9	10	11	12	13	14	15	16	17	18	19	Final
AP	1 (37)	2 (14)	2 (7)	2 (31)	2 (19)	1 (57)	1 (56)	5 (4)	5 (4)	7	7	9	11	13	14	12	15	13	17	17	Not released
Coaches	1 (14)	1*	2	2 (15)	2 (10)	1 (26)	1 (27)	5 (2)	6	9	8	10	12	14	14	12	16	14	18	17	16

*There was no coaches poll for Week 1, so the rank provided is the preseason rank.
