= Marial Shayok =

Canadian basketball player (born 1995)

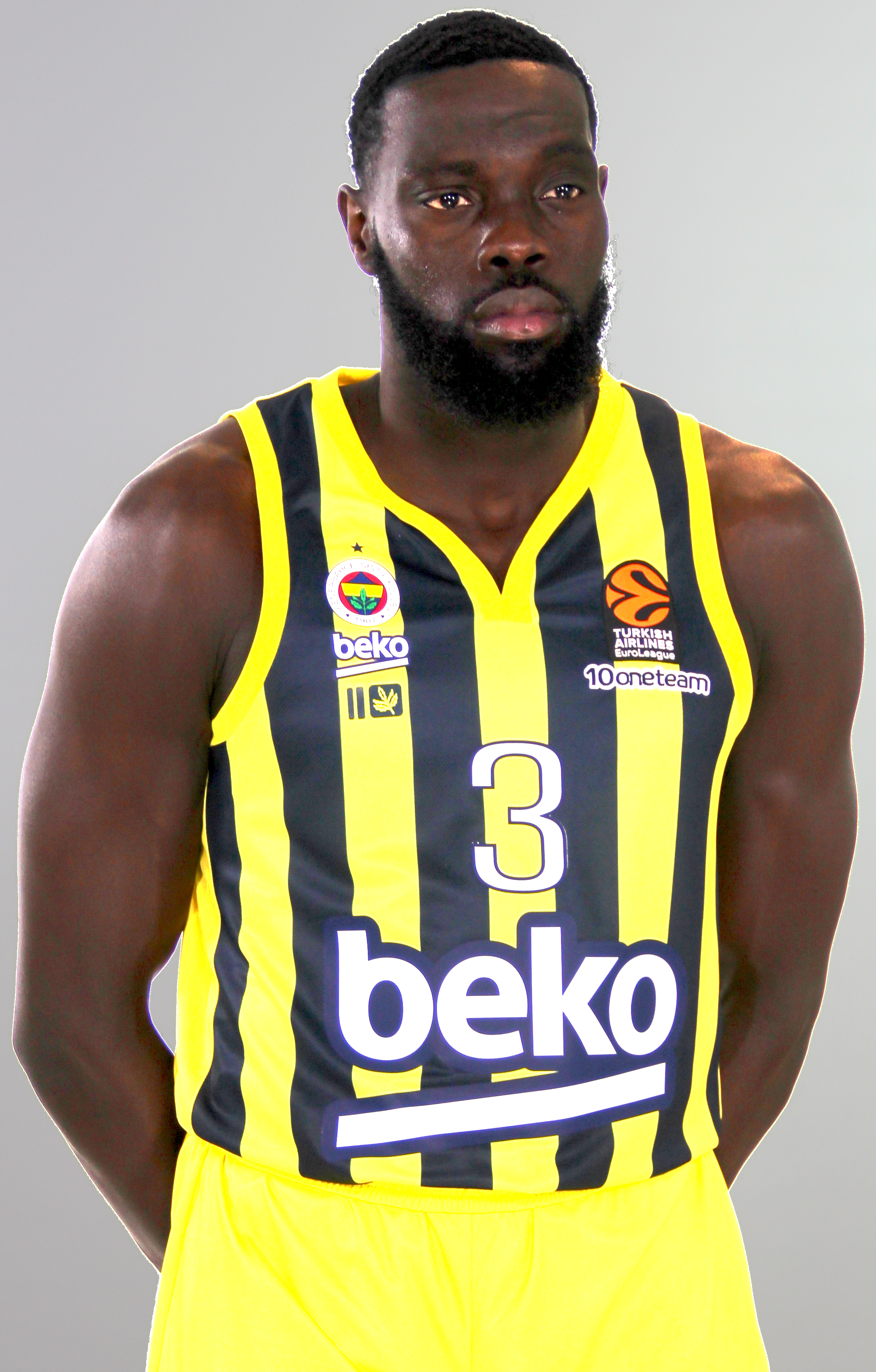
- Shayok with Fenerbahçe in 2021

No. 1 – Budućnost
- Position: Small forward / shooting guard
- League: Prva A Liga; ABA League; EuroCup

Personal information
- Born: July 26, 1995 (age 31) Ottawa, Ontario, Canada
- Listed height: 6 ft 5 in (1.96 m)
- Listed weight: 205 lb (93 kg)

Career information
- High school: St. Patrick's (Ottawa, Ontario); Blair Academy (Blairstown, New Jersey)
- College: Virginia (2014–2017); Iowa State (2018–2019)
- NBA draft: 2019: 2nd round, 54th overall pick
- Drafted by: Philadelphia 76ers
- Playing career: 2019–present

Career history
- 2019–2020: Philadelphia 76ers
- 2019–2020: →Delaware Blue Coats
- 2021: Bursaspor
- 2021–2022: Fenerbahçe
- 2022–2023: Maine Celtics
- 2023–2024: Shandong Hi-Speed Kirin
- 2024: Liaoning Flying Leopards
- 2024–2025: Maccabi Tel Aviv
- 2026: Altiri Chiba
- 2026–present: Budućnost

Career highlights
- All-NBA G League Third Team (2020); NBA G League All-Rookie Team (2020); AP Honorable Mention All-American (2019); First-team All-Big 12 (2019); Big 12 tournament MVP (2019)
- Stats at NBA.com
- Stats at Basketball Reference

Marial Makur Shayok (/ˈʃeɪɒk/ SHAY-ok; born July 26, 1995) is a South Sudanese-Canadian professional basketball player for Budućnost of the Montenegrin Prva A Liga, the ABA League, and the EuroCup. He played college basketball for the Virginia Cavaliers and Iowa State Cyclones. He was selected 54th overall by the Philadelphia 76ers in the 2019 NBA draft, and played briefly for the Sixers. Shayok represented the South Sudan national team in the 2023 FIBA World Cup and the 2024 Olympics.

== Early life ==
Shayok was born in Ottawa, Ontario, to Sudanese father Makur and mother Helena. Makur played basketball at the University of Dayton (1990-92)). Marial has four siblings, including two who played college basketball in the NCAA. His sister, Yar, played for the University of Detroit Mercy, then signed with a professional team in France, while his older brother Shayok played at the IMG Academy and later at Bradley University. He also played basketball professionally in South America.

Shayok started playing basketball at the age of seven, sometimes on the playgrounds, sometimes at the YMCA. Growing up, his favorite players were Michael Jordan, Kobe Bryant, Kevin Durant, Penny Hardaway, and Dwyane Wade.

== High school career ==
Shayok first attended and played basketball for three seasons for St. Patrick’s High School in Ottawa, Canada.

He then attended Blair Academy in Blairstown, New Jersey, where Shayok played for two seasons while coached by Joe Mantegna. As a junior in 2012-13, he averaged 15 points, 6 rebounds, and 4 assists per game, He was named New Jersey Prep All-State and All-Mid Atlantic Prep League First-Team. As a senior in 2013-14, he averaged 15 points, 6 rebounds, and 3 assists per game, He was a First Team All-Prep selection by The Star-Ledger, named the New Jersey Prep Player of the Year, and named New Jersey Prep All-State and All-Mid Atlantic Prep League First-Team .

Coming out of high school, Shayok signed with Marquette, but he never played for the team.

== College career ==
=== Virginia ===
As a freshman at Virginia, Shayok averaged 3.8 points and 1.8 rebounds per game. The following season, he averaged 4.3 points and 1.9 rebounds per game, while shooting 49.2% from the field and 43.6% from 3-point range. Shayok posted 8.9 points and 2.4 rebounds per game for the Cavaliers as a junior, shooting 44 percent from the field and 33 percent from 3-point range. He scored 23 points in Virginia's victory in the first round of the NCAA Tournament against the UNC Wilmington Seahawks. Following the season, Shayok opted to transfer and signed with Iowa State on April 19, 2017.

=== Iowa State ===
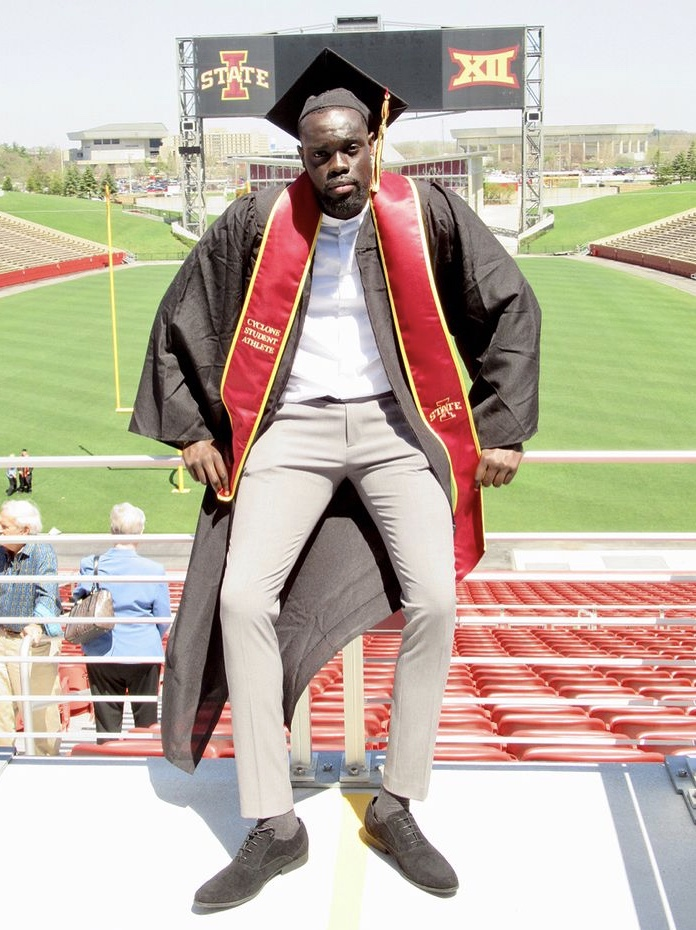
Shayok at his 2019 Iowa State graduation

Playing for Iowa State, Shayok scored 24 points in a 77–60 win over Kansas on January 5, 2019. On January 7, Shayok was named Big 12 Player of the Week. In the semifinals of the Big 12 Conference tournament, the redshirt senior hit a pair of big 3-pointers in the final two minutes to help five-seed Iowa State defeat top seed Kansas State 63–59. Shayok finished with a game-high 21 points, helping the Cyclones battle back from a five-point deficit with 2 minutes, and 47 seconds remaining. None were bigger than the final two shots Shayok hit. On March 16, in the finals of the Big 12 Conference tournament, Shayok scored 15 points in a 78–66 win over Kansas and was named the Big 12 tournament MVP to add to being named First-team All-Big 12.

On day two of the 2019 Portsmouth Invitational Tournament, Shayok scored 37 points, including a three-pointer to force overtime for his team, as well as the game-winning shot in OT. He was 7-of-9 from three-point range and also had 7 rebounds. He was later named as part of the PIT All-Tournament Team.

For the season, he averaged 18.7 points (2nd in the conference), 4.9 rebounds, 2.0 assists, and 2.1 three-pointers (6th) per game, shooting 49.6% (2nd) from the field, 38.6% from three-point range (8th), and 87.8% (2nd; 18th in the NCAA) from the free throw line. Shayok was the only player in the US who averaged 18.5 points while shooting at least 49% from the field, 38% on three-pointers, and 87% at the free throw line. He was named an Associated Press All-America Honorable Mention, a Julius Erving Award finalist (Small Forward of the Year), and an All-Big 12 First-Team selection.

== Professional career ==
=== Philadelphia 76ers (2019–2020) ===
Shayok was selected with the 54th overall pick in the 2019 NBA draft by the Philadelphia 76ers. On July 7, 2019, the 76ers announced that they had signed Shayok to a two-way contract, meaning he would split time between the 76ers and their G League affiliate, the Delaware Blue Coats. Shayok was named G League player of the week on November 18 after averaging 35.0 points, 9.3 rebounds, and 3.7 assists in three games for the Blue Coats, including 42 points against the Greensboro Swarm. On December 6, Shayok scored 31 points in a 110–109 win over the Capital City Go-Go on 13-of-23 shooting. He had 29 points and six assists on January 20, 2020, in a 119–109 win over the South Bay Lakers.

On February 6, Shayok made his NBA debut for the 76ers, hitting a three-pointer in a 112–101 loss to the Milwaukee Bucks. During the shortened 2019-20 G League season, in 35 games Shayok averaged 22.4 points (6th in the league), 6 rebounds, and 3.8 assists per game, shooting 46% from the field, 36% from three-point range, and 88.9% (9th) from the free throw line. He was named 2019-20 All-G League, and G-League All-Rookie Team. The 76ers waived him during the offseason.

=== Bursaspor (2021) ===
On January 5, 2021, he signed with Frutti Extra Bursaspor of the Turkish Super League (BSL). In 12 games with them, Shayok averaged 18.9 points (2nd in the league), 6.9 rebounds, and 4.2 assists, with an 88.1% free throw percentage.

=== Fenerbahçe (2021–2022) ===
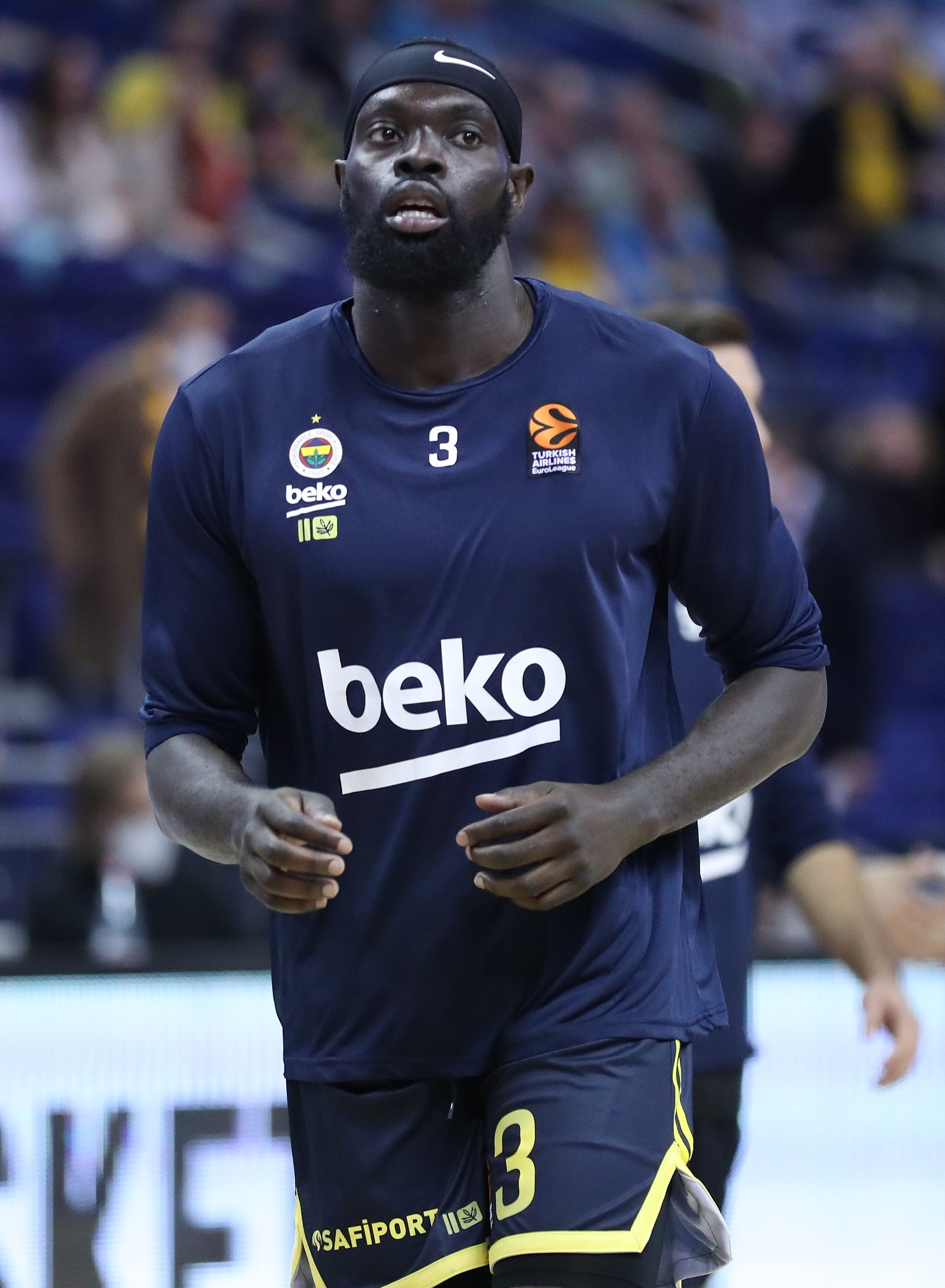
Shayok in 2021

Following his very strong finish to the season, Shayok signed a two (1+1) year deal with fellow Turkish club Fenerbahçe on June 21, 2021. In 25 games in 2021-22 he averaged 5.4 points, 2.2 rebounds, and 1.8 assists per game.

=== Maine Celtics (2022–2023) ===
On October 24, 2022, Shayok joined the Maine Celtics training camp roster. He played 21 games for the team in the G League, and averaged 19.7 points, 4.7 rebounds, and 4.4 assists per game while shooting 57.5% from the floor, 50.0% (3rd in the league) from three-point range, and 92.2% (2nd in the league) from the free throw line for the season of 2022–2023.

=== Shandong (2023–2024) ===
On October 23, 2023, Shayok signed with Shandong, of the Chinese Basketball Association (CBA). He averaged 19.1 points, 4.6 rebounds, 3.6 assists, and 1.2 steals per game, while shooting 41.1% from three-point range, and 81.2% from the free throw line.

=== Liaoning Flying Leopards (2024) ===
On September 20, 2024, Shayok joined the Liaoning Flying Leopards of the Chinese Basketball Association (CBA). In 47 games, he averaged 13.8 points, 3.2 rebounds, 2.4 assists, and 1.0 steals per game, while shooting 41.0% from three-point range, and 87.5% from the free throw line.

=== Maccabi Tel Aviv (2024–2025) ===
On November 14, 2024, he signed a two-year deal with Maccabi Tel Aviv of the Israeli Premier League. Shayok joined Maccabi Tel Aviv center Wenyen Gabriel, alongside whom he had represented South Sudan at the 2024 Olympic Games.

=== Budućnost (2026–present) ===
On July 17, 2026, Shayok signed with Budućnost of Montenegrin Prva A Liga, the ABA League, and the EuroCup.

== International career ==
Shayok represented South Sudan at the 2023 FIBA World Cup, averaging 13.2 points 3.5 rebounds, and 2.2 assists per game. The South Sudan men's basketball team finished the FIBA World Cup with a 3–2 record, and qualified for the 2024 Paris Olympics.

At the Olympics, he averaged 14.7 points, 3.7 rebounds, and 1.3 assists per game, as South Sudan defeated Puerto Rico but lost to Serbia and the United States. In a pre-Olympics exhibition game, he scored 25 points against Team USA, as South Sudan lost to the eventual gold medal winner by just one point, 100–101, as Team USA was led by four former NBA MVP winners, LeBron James, Joel Embiid, Stephen Curry, and Kevin Durant.

== Career statistics ==
Legend
GP	Games played	GS	Games started	MPG	Minutes per game
FG%	Field goal percentage	3P%	3-point field goal percentage	FT%	Free throw percentage
RPG	Rebounds per game	APG	Assists per game	SPG	Steals per game
BPG	Blocks per game	PPG	Points per game	**Bold**	Career high

=== NBA ===
==== Regular season ====
Year	Team	GP	GS	MPG	FG%	3P%	FT%	RPG	APG	SPG	BPG	PPG
2019–20	Philadelphia	4	0	7.0	.250	.333	.750	1.8	.3	.3	.0	2.8
Career		4	0	7.0	.250	.333	.750	1.8	.3	.3	.0	2.8

=== College ===
Year	Team	GP	GS	MPG	FG%	3P%	FT%	RPG	APG	SPG	BPG	PPG
2014–15	Virginia	34	1	14.6	.405	.380	.630	1.8	1.0	.6	**.3**	3.8
2015–16	Virginia	**35**	8	15.0	.492	**.436**	.548	1.9	1.1	.3	.1	4.3
2016–17	Virginia	34	14	20.6	.445	.328	.796	2.4	1.0	**.9**	**.3**	8.9
2018–19	Iowa State	34	**34**	**32.9**	**.496**	.386	**.878**	**4.9**	**2.0**	**.9**	.2	**18.7**
Career		137	57	20.7	.470	.381	.787	2.7	1.3	.7	.2	8.9
