= Lagerald Vick =

American basketball player (born 1997)

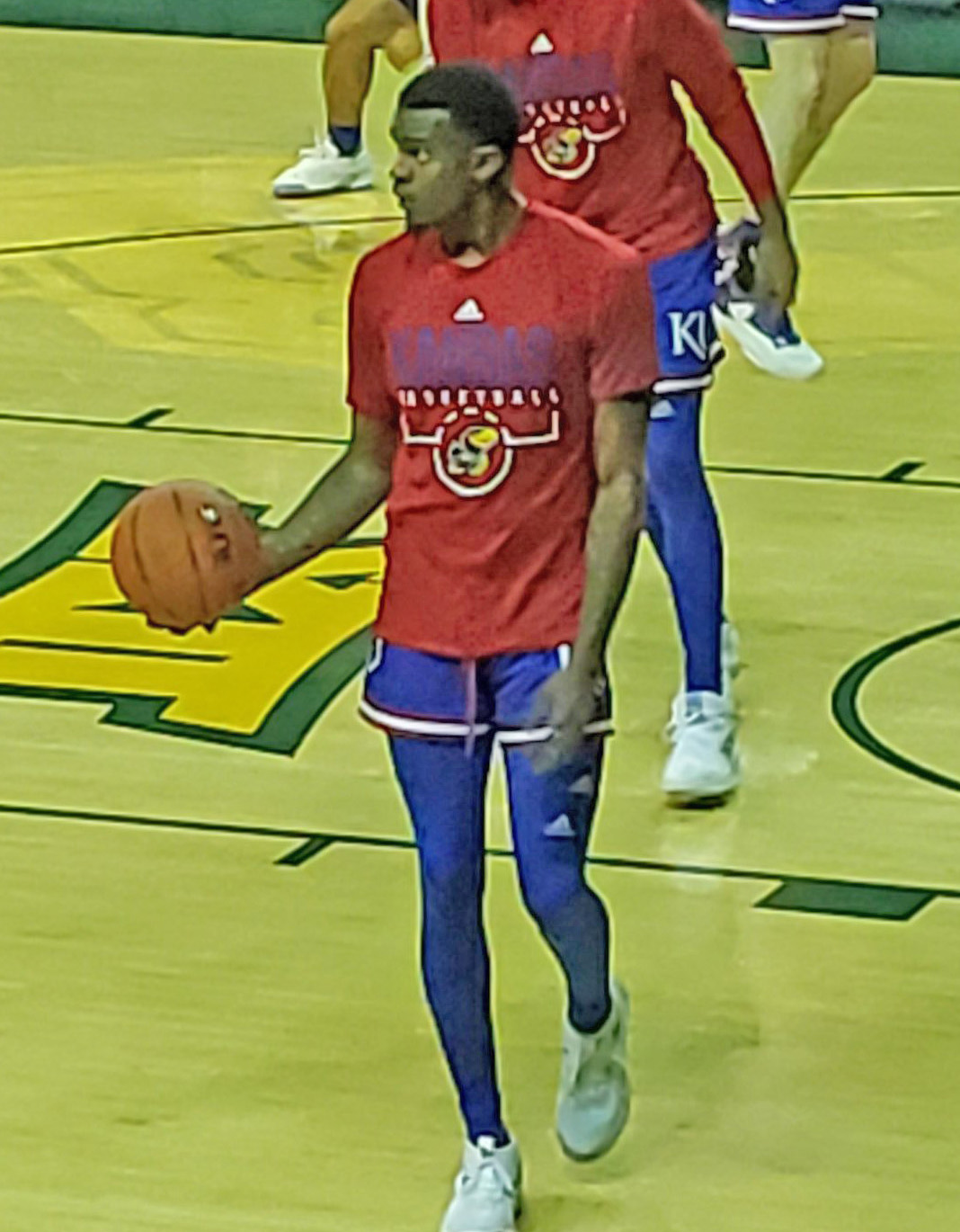
- Vick in January 2019

Free agent
- Position: Shooting guard

Personal information
- Born: January 12, 1997 (age 29) Memphis, Tennessee, U.S.
- Listed height: 6 ft 5 in (1.96 m)
- Listed weight: 200 lb (91 kg)

Career information
- High school: Douglass (Memphis, Tennessee)
- College: Kansas (2015–2019)
- NBA draft: 2019: undrafted
- Playing career: 2019–present

Career history
- 2019: Yulon Luxgen Dinos
- 2021: Team Cali
- 2022: Astros de Jalisco
- 2022: Spartans Distrito Capital
- 2023: Club Atlético Olimpia
- 2023: Astros de Jalisco
- 2024: Southland Sharks

Career highlights
- 2× CIBACOPA champion (2022, 2023); 2× CIBACOPA All-Star (2022, 2023)
Medals
Men's basketball
Representing United States
Summer Universiade
Gold medal – first place	2015 Gwangju	Team competition

Lagerald Montrell Vick (born January 12, 1997) is an American professional basketball player who last played for the Southland Sharks of the New Zealand National Basketball League (NZNBL).

== College career ==
Vick is a native of Memphis, Tennessee. He originally committed to SMU and SMU head coach Larry Brown, but on May 17, 2015, Vick committed to the Kansas Jayhawks and KU head coach Bill Self. As a freshman, he played in 19 games and averaged 4.8 minutes and 2.1 points per game. He was named to the 2015–16 Academic All-Big 12 Rookie Team. He became part of the rotation as a sophomore, playing in 36 games, averaging 7.4 points, 3.5 rebounds, and 37 percent shooting from three-point range.

As a junior, Vick played in 39 games and averaged 12.2 points, 4.8 rebounds and 2.1 assists, while shooting 37.3% from three-point range on the 2018 Final Four Team. He had averaged 17 points through the first 12 games. In the second round of the 2018 NCAA tournament, Vick scored 13 points on 5-of-9 shooting and collected four rebounds in a win over Seton Hall Pirates. He was named an All-Big 12 Honorable Mention selection after his junior season.

Following his junior season, Vick announced he would enter the 2018 NBA draft, but later withdrew his name. He was initially undecided on if he would return Kansas, play in the NBA G League, or transfer schools; however, on June 29, 2018, Vick announced he would return to Kansas.

As a senior in 2018–19, Vick was named Big 12 player of the week on November 19, 2018. In games against the Louisiana Ragin' Cajuns and Vermont Catamounts, he scored 33 and 32 points respectively. He hit 15 3-pointers in the two games, which set a Kansas Jayhawks record for most 3-pointers made in consecutive games. On January 12, 2019, he scored his 1,000 career point as a college player against the Baylor Bears. On February 8, 2019, it was announced that Vick would be taking a leave of absence to handle personal issues. For the season, he averaged 14.5 points, 4.0 rebounds, 1.5 steals, and 1.9 assists a game, while shooting 46.1% on three pointers.

== Professional career ==
In December 2019, Vick played two games for the Yulon Luxgen Dinos of the Super Basketball League in Taiwan.

In October 2021, Vick joined Team Cali of the Baloncesto Profesional Colombiano. In 13 games between October 24 and November 18, he averaged 17.5 points, 5.8 rebounds, 2.2 assists and 1.8 steals per game.

In March 2022, Vick joined the Astros de Jalisco of the Mexican Circuito de Baloncesto de la Costa del Pacífico (CIBACOPA). He helped the team win its first league title and was named an All-Star. In 49 games, he averaged 13.6 points, 4.3 rebounds and 1.6 assists per game.

In July 2022, Vick joined Spartans Distrito Capital of the Superliga Profesional de Baloncesto in Venezuela. In 12 games between July 23 and September 14, he averaged 13.4 points, 4.8 rebounds, 2.7 assists and 1.3 steals per game.

In January 2023, Vick had a two-time stint with Club Atlético Olimpia of the Liga Uruguaya de Básquetbol.

Vick re-joined the Astros de Jalisco in 2023, playing in both the CIBACOPA and LNBP. He earned CIBACOPA All-Star honors.

In January 2024, Vick signed with the Southland Sharks for the 2024 New Zealand NBL season. He was released by the Sharks on April 29, 2024.

== National team career ==
In 2015, Vick won gold with the USA University National Team at the World University Games in South Korea. In eight games, he averaged 4.5 points and 2.3 rebounds per game.

== Attempted murder arrest ==
On July 11, 2026, Vick was arrested and charged with attempted first-degree murder. The alleged incident occurred on July 4, 2026, after Vick allegedly shot another man in the back after an altercation.

== Career statistics ==
Legend
GP	Games played	GS	Games started	MPG	Minutes per game
FG%	Field goal percentage	3P%	3-point field goal percentage	FT%	Free throw percentage
RPG	Rebounds per game	APG	Assists per game	SPG	Steals per game
BPG	Blocks per game	PPG	Points per game	**Bold**	Career high

=== College ===
Year	Team	GP	GS	MPG	FG%	3P%	FT%	RPG	APG	SPG	BPG	PPG
2015–16	Kansas	19	0	4.8	**.560**	**.471**	.500	.3	.4	.2	.1	2.1
2016–17	Kansas	36	6	24.4	.443	.370	**.826**	3.5	.9	.6	**.4**	7.4
2017–18	Kansas	**39**	**35**	**33.1**	.488	.373	.673	**4.8**	**2.1**	.9	.3	12.1
2018–19	Kansas	23	20	33.0	.476	.455	.767	4.0	1.9	**1.2**	.2	**14.1**
Career		117	61	25.8	.475	.405	.737	3.5	1.4	.7	.3	9.4
