= King McClure =

American basketball player

King McClure (born October 1, 1996) is a former American college basketball player and sports analyst. He played for the Baylor Bears men's basketball team in the Big 12 Conference during his collegiate career. After retiring from basketball for health reasons, he transitioned into sports broadcasting and is known for his work as a basketball analyst on ESPN.

== Early life and high school career ==
King McClure was born and raised in Dallas, Texas. He is the son of Leroy McClure Jr, the founder of two local charter schools, Triple A Academy and Focus Learning Academy, for students with learning disabilities. King attended Triple A Academy, where he excelled as a basketball player. During his high school career, McClure was a highly regarded shooting guard and was named to the McDonald's All-American nominee list. He was ranked as a four-star recruit and received scholarship offers from top college basketball programs.

== College career ==
McClure committed to Baylor University, where he played from 2015 to 2019 under head coach Scott Drew. Throughout his college career, McClure was known for his three-point shooting, defensive skills, and leadership on the court. He contributed significantly to the Bears’ success during his tenure, helping the team reach the NCAA Tournament multiple times.

During his sophomore season, McClure was diagnosed with hypertrophic cardiomyopathy, a heart condition that threatened his basketball career. McClure underwent surgery for an implantable cardioverter-defibrillator to manage his condition and continued to play for Baylor.

== Post-basketball career ==
McClure graduated from Baylor with a degree in Health, Kinesiology and Leisure Studies. After graduating, McClure hoped to play in the NBA but doctors on the NBA board told him his chances to play were slim. McClure decided to pursue a career in sports broadcasting. He joined ESPN as a college basketball analyst for the 2019-2020 season.

In addition to his broadcasting work, McClure is a motivational speaker, sharing his experience about overcoming adversity.

== Personal life ==
King McClure remains active in the Dallas community, participating in local events and charity initiatives.
