= Makai Mason =

American-German basketball player

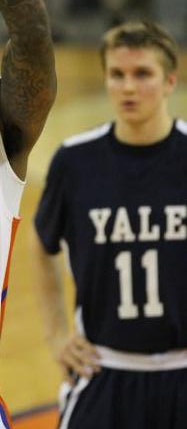
- Mason in 2014

Free Agent
- Position: Point guard / shooting guard

Personal information
- Born: May 4, 1995 (age 31) Greenfield, Massachusetts, U.S.
- Listed height: 185 cm (6 ft 1 in)
- Listed weight: 84 kg (185 lb)

Career information
- High school: Hotchkiss School (Lakeville, Connecticut)
- College: Yale (2014–2018); Baylor (2018–2019)
- NBA draft: 2019: undrafted
- Playing career: 2019–present

Career history
- 2019–2020: Alba Berlin
- 2020–2021: Manresa

Career highlights
- First-team All-Ivy League (2016); Second-team All-Big 12 (2019)

Makai Mason (born May 4, 1995) is an American-German professional basketball player who last played for Baxi Manresa of the Liga ACB. He played college basketball for the Yale Bulldogs and Baylor Bears.

== Early life ==
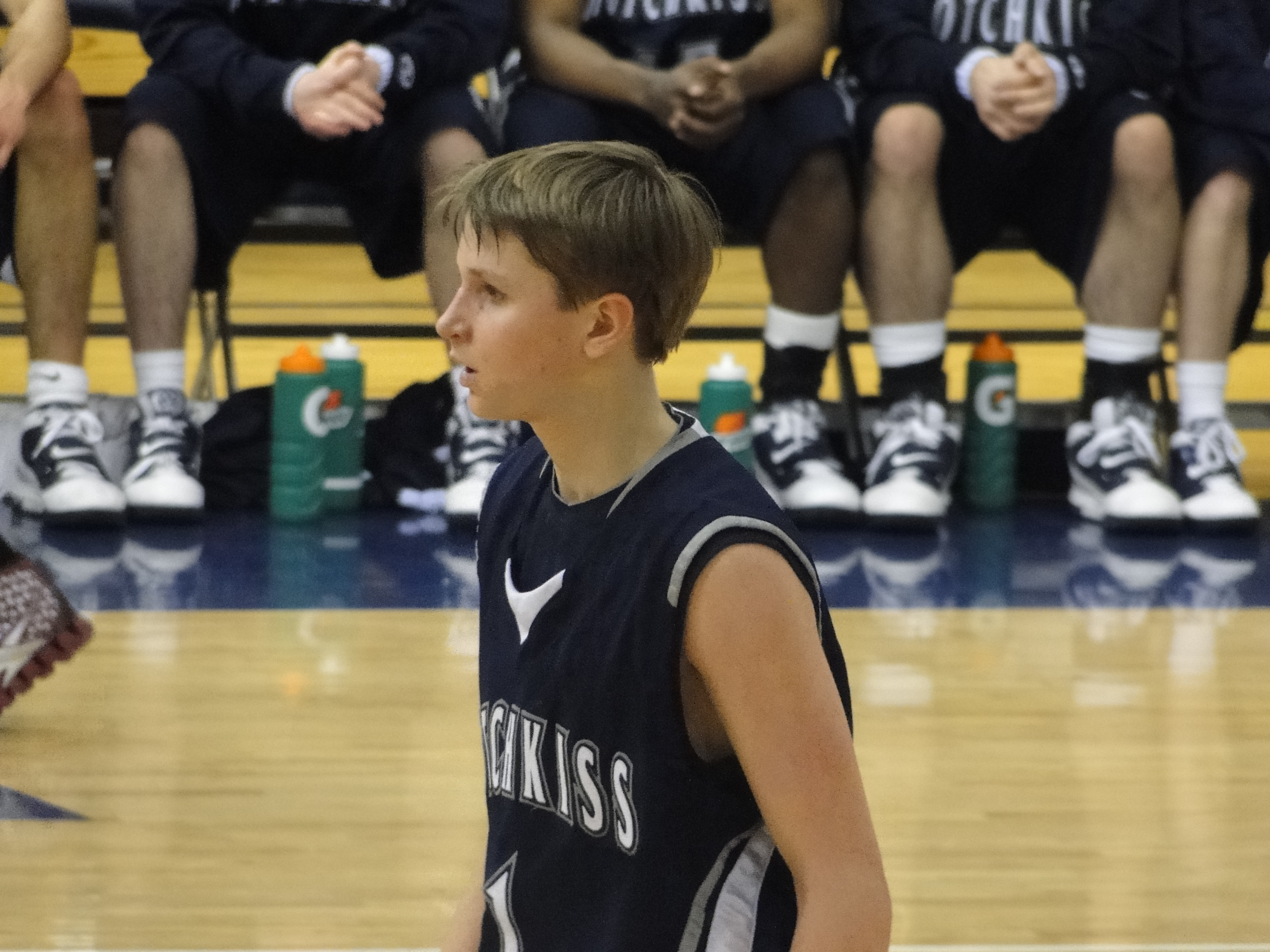
Mason in 2009

A Greenfield, Massachusetts, native, Mason attended The Hotchkiss School in Lakeville, Connecticut. He garnered NEPSAC Class A Player of the Year honors as a senior and enrolled at Yale University in 2014.

== College career ==
In his first year in college, Mason appeared in 31 games for the Bulldogs with per-game averages of 6.2 points, 2.2 rebounds and 1.6 assists, earning him the John C. Cobb Outstanding Freshman Award.

His sophomore campaign in 2015-16 was his breakout year. Mason took home All-Ivy League First Team honors, along with a NABC District 13 Second Team selection. He was also recognized with the Bill Madden Toughness Award and was the co-recipient of the Dutch Arnold Most Valuable Player Award (alongside his teammate Justin Sears). Mason emerged as Yale's leading scorer (16.0 points per game) and assist man (3.8 per game), while guiding the Bulldogs to their first ever NCAA Tournament victory, hitting on 9-of-18 from the field and netting a career-high 31 points in Yale's 79–75 upset win over heavily favored Baylor. Yale fell short to Duke in the second round. Mason declared for the 2016 NBA draft, but later withdrew his name.

On November 8, 2016, it was announced that Mason would miss the entire 2016–17 College Basketball season with a broken right foot. He suffered a stress fracture in his left foot in November 2017.

In 2018, Mason transferred to Baylor University to complete his basketball eligibility as a graduate student for the 2018–19 season. Despite dealing with injuries, Mason averaged 14.9 points and 3.4 assists per game in his only season at Baylor.

== Professional career ==
After going undrafted in the 2019 NBA draft, Mason signed his first professional contract with Alba Berlin of the Basketball Bundesliga. He averaged 3.9 points and 0.8 assists per game. On July 3, 2020, Mason left the German team in order to join Liga ACB club Manresa.

== International career ==
Mason has dual citizenship in the United States and Germany, his mother was born in Mainz, Germany. In 2016, Mason was selected for the German national basketball team, to play in the qualification rounds for the EuroBasket 2017. He played his first official game for Team Germany on July 30 against Ukraine.
