= 2027 FIBA Basketball World Cup qualification (Asia) =

2027 FIBA Basketball World Cup
Asian Qualifiers

Tournament details
- Dates: 27 November 2025 – March 2027
- Teams: 16 (from 2 confederations)

Official website
- Asian qualifiers website

The 2027 FIBA Basketball World Cup qualification for the FIBA Asia-Oceania region, began in November 2025 and will conclude in March 2027. The process will determine the seven teams that will join the automatically qualified host Qatar at the 2027 FIBA World Cup.

== Format ==
In total, eight World Cup berths were allocated for the Asia-Oceania region. A slot was automatically given to Qatar as the hosts.

The qualification structure is as follows:

- First round: 16 teams were divided into four groups of four teams to play a double round-robin system (home-and-away matches). The top three teams from each group (or the top two teams from Qatar's group) advanced to the second round.
- Second round: 12 teams were divided into two groups of six teams. Each group was formed from teams that advanced from the four first round groups. All results from the previous round were carried over. Each team played against the three teams in their group that they haven't faced yet on a home-and-away basis. The top three teams in each group and the best fourth-place team qualify for the World Cup, alongside host Qatar.

== Entrants ==
The 16 teams that qualified for the 2025 FIBA Asia Cup participated in the first round of the 2027 FIBA Basketball World Cup Asian qualifiers. Qatar, the host of the 2027 FIBA Basketball World Cup, also participated in the qualifiers, despite being automatically qualified for the tournament.

- Australia
- China
- Chinese Taipei
- Guam
- India
- Iran
- Iraq
- Japan
- Jordan
- Lebanon
- New Zealand
- Philippines
- Qatar
- Saudi Arabia
- South Korea
- Syria

== Qualifiers ==
=== Draw ===
The draw was held on 13 May 2025. Qatar will advance to the second round, regardless of their placement.

=== Seeding ===
The seeding was announced on 9 May 2025.

Pot 1
| Team | Pos |
|---|---|
| Australia | 7 |
| Japan | 21 |

Pot 5
| Team | Pos |
|---|---|
| Philippines | 34 |
| South Korea | 53 |

Pot 2
| Team | Pos |
|---|---|
| Iran | 28 |
| Lebanon | 29 |

Pot 6
| Team | Pos |
|---|---|
| Syria | 71 |
| India | 76 |

Pot 3
| Team | Pos |
|---|---|
| New Zealand | 22 |
| China | 30 |

Pot 7
| Team | Pos |
|---|---|
| Chinese Taipei | 73 |
| Guam | 88 |

Pot 4
| Team | Pos |
|---|---|
| Jordan | 35 |
| Saudi Arabia | 65 |

Pot 8
| Team | Pos |
|---|---|
| Qatar | 87 |
| Iraq | 92 |

=== First round ===
All times are local.

==== Group A ====
| Pos | Team | Pld | W | L | PF | PA | PD | Pts | Qualification |
|---|---|---|---|---|---|---|---|---|---|
| 1 | Australia | 6 | 6 | 0 | 565 | 403 | +162 | 12 | Second round |
| 2 | New Zealand | 6 | 4 | 2 | 559 | 473 | +86 | 10 | Second round |
| 3 | Philippines | 6 | 2 | 4 | 465 | 477 | −12 | 8 | Second round |
| 4 | Guam | 6 | 0 | 6 | 391 | 627 | −236 | 6 | |

Source: FIBA
Rules for classification: 1) Points; 2) Head-to-head results; 3) Points difference; 4) Points scored.

| 28 November 2025 | Australia | 84–79 | New Zealand | Hobart |
| 19:30 | Scoring by quarter: 28–24, 14–24, 24–19, 18–12 |
| | Pts: Galloway 19; Rebs: Kay 8 Asts: Hickey 6 | Boxscore | Pts: Mennenga 19; Rebs: Mennenga 10; Asts: Cameron 7 | Arena: MyState Bank Arena; Attendance: 4,137; Referees: Takaki Kato (JPN), Zhang Xiao (CHN), Daigo Urushima (JPN) |

| 28 November 2025 | Guam | 46–87 | Philippines | Mangilao |
| 19:00 | Scoring by quarter: 17–17, 12–23, 7–24, 10–23 |
| | Pts: Cruz 17; Rebs: Galloway 7 Asts: Cruz, Simon 2 | Boxscore | Pts: Brownlee 22; Rebs: Fajardo, Millora-Brown 10; Asts: Newsome 5 | Arena: UOG Calvo Field House; Attendance: 2,364; Referees: Park Kyoung-jin (KOR), Sun Jian (CHN), Lee Kyoung-hwan (KOR) |

| 1 December 2025 | New Zealand | 77–79 | Australia | Wellington |
| 19:00 | Scoring by quarter: 21–23, 16–16, 25–18, 15–22 |
| | Pts: Mennenga 16; Rebs: Harrison, Wetzell 8 Asts: King 5 | Boxscore | Pts: Pinder 21; Rebs: Kay 9 Asts: Hickey 7 | Arena: TSB Arena; Attendance: 3,050; Referees: Sun Jian (CHN), Park Kyoung-jin (KOR), Lee Kyoung-hwan (KOR) |

| 1 December 2025 | Philippines | 95–71 | Guam | Quezon City |
| 19:30 | Scoring by quarter: 32–15, 18–21, 22–19, 23–16 |
| | Pts: Brownlee 20; Rebs: Millora-Brown 9 Asts: Brownlee 8 | Boxscore | Pts: Cruz 27; Rebs: Galloway 18; Asts: Cruz, Galloway 3 | Arena: Blue Eagle Gym; Attendance: 3,788; Referees: Takaki Kato (JPN), Zhang Xiao (CHN), Daigo Urushima (JPN) |

| 26 February 2026 | Guam | 80–93 | Australia | Mangilao |
| 19:00 | Scoring by quarter: 17–17, 16–29, 26–27, 21–20 |
| | Pts: Freeman 25; Rebs: Freeman 9 Asts: Freeman, Simon 4 | Boxscore | Pts: Krebs 28; Rebs: Kay 11; Asts: Wilson 10 | Arena: UOG Calvo Field House; Attendance: 611; Referees: Takaki Kato (JPN), Zhang Xiao (CHN), Chuang Chih-chun (TPE) |

| 26 February 2026 | Philippines | 66–69 | New Zealand | Pasay |
| 19:30 | Scoring by quarter: 21–25, 16–12, 9–20, 20–12 |
| | Pts: Ramos 16; Rebs: Edu 11; Asts: Edu, Perez 3 | Boxscore | Pts: Darling 11; Rebs: Mennenga 14; Asts: three players 4 | Arena: SM Mall of Asia Arena; Attendance: 12,054; Referees: Sun Jian (CHN), Daigo Urushima (JPN), Park Kyoung-jin (KOR) |

| 1 March 2026 | Guam | 67–99 | New Zealand | Mangilao |
| 17:00 | Scoring by quarter: 18–25, 16–26, 16–18, 17–30 |
| | Pts: Galloway 20; Rebs: Galloway 5 Asts: Galloway 5 | Boxscore | Pts: Andrew 20; Rebs: Andrew 9 Asts: Britt 9 | Arena: UOG Calvo Field House; Attendance: 1,408; Referees: Takaki Kato (JPN), Lee Kyoung-hwan (KOR), Haruga Iwai (JPN) |

| 1 March 2026 | Philippines | 66–93 | Australia | Pasay |
| 19:30 | Scoring by quarter: 13–14, 20–24, 20–30, 13–25 |
| | Pts: Brownlee 20; Rebs: Brownlee 8 Asts: Brownlee 7 | Boxscore | Pts: Pepper 28; Rebs: Kay 8 Asts: Creek 5 | Arena: SM Mall of Asia Arena; Attendance: 17,301; Referees: Park Kyoung-jin (KOR), Sun Jian (CHN), Yuen Chun Yip (HKG) |

| 3 July 2026 | New Zealand | 106–102(2OT) | Philippines | Auckland |
| 19:00 | Scoring by quarter: 23–17, 21–22, 19–25, 20–19, Overtime: 10–10, 13–9 |
| | Pts: Te Rangi 22; Rebs: Waardenburg 10; Asts: Ili 6 | Boxscore | Pts: Gómez de Liaño, Quiambao 23; Rebs: Brownlee 8 Asts: Abarrientos 10 | Arena: Spark Arena; Attendance: 8,690; Referees: Daigo Urushima (JPN), Chan Owe Shiong (MAS), Chuang Chih-chun (TPE) |

| 3 July 2026 | Australia | 124–52 | Guam | Perth |
| 18:30 | Scoring by quarter: 32–16, 33–10, 28–18, 31–8 |
| | Pts: Proctor 22; Rebs: Pinder 11; Asts: Armstrong, Cotton 5 | Boxscore | Pts: Ross 22; Rebs: Galloway 7 Asts: Freeman 3 | Arena: Perth Arena; Attendance: 5,580; Referees: Takaki Kato (JPN), Leong Chuen Wing (SGP), Jiang Wenan (CHN) |

| 6 July 2026 | New Zealand | 129–75 | Guam | Auckland |
| 19:00 | Scoring by quarter: 35–24, 28–14, 35–13, 31–24 |
| | Pts: Mennenga 27; Rebs: Timmins 10; Asts: Davison, Rasmussen 6 | Boxscore | Pts: Galloway 21; Rebs: Galloway 7 Asts: Simon 5 | Arena: Eventfinda Stadium; Attendance: 1,570; Referees: Daigo Urushima (JPN), Owe Shiong Chan (MAS), Chuang Chih-Chun (TPE) |

| 6 July 2026 | Australia | 92–49 | Philippines | Perth |
| 18:30 | Scoring by quarter: 33–14, 8–13, 22–10, 29–12 |
| | Pts: Cotton 21; Rebs: Bannan 11; Asts: Cotton, Glover 5 | Boxscore | Pts: Ramos 9 Rebs: Phillips 12; Asts: Fajardo, Ramos 3 | Arena: Perth Arena; Attendance: 10,037; Referees: Takaki Kato (JPN), Leung Chuen Wing (SGP), Jiang Wenan (CHN) |

Australia's 72-point win over Guam on 3 July 2026 was the largest victory in FIBA World Cup Qualifying history.

==== Group B ====
| Pos | Team | Pld | W | L | PF | PA | PD | Pts | Qualification |
|---|---|---|---|---|---|---|---|---|---|
| 1 | Japan | 6 | 4 | 2 | 499 | 450 | +49 | 10 | Second round |
| 2 | South Korea | 6 | 3 | 3 | 468 | 468 | 0 | 9 (Note: South Korea 170–152 China.) | Second round |
| 3 | China | 6 | 3 | 3 | 504 | 509 | −5 | 9 | Second round |
| 4 | Chinese Taipei | 6 | 2 | 4 | 463 | 507 | −44 | 8 | |

Source: FIBA
Rules for classification: 1) Points; 2) Head-to-head results; 3) Points difference; 4) Points scored.
Notes:

| 28 November 2025 | Japan | 90–64 | Chinese Taipei | Kobe |
| 19:05 | Scoring by quarter: 23–10, 22–12, 20–20, 25–22 |
| | Pts: Watanabe 20; Rebs: Hawkinson 12; Asts: Hawkinson 8 | Boxscore | Pts: Gilbeck 23; Rebs: Lu 9 Asts: Chen 4 | Arena: Glion Arena Kobe; Attendance: 9,254; Referees: James Boyer (AUS), Glenn Cornelio (PHI), Leong Chuen Wing (SGP) |

| 28 November 2025 | China | 76–80 | South Korea | Beijing |
| 19:30 | Scoring by quarter: 16–24, 18–23, 18–14, 24–19 |
| | Pts: Zhang 20; Rebs: Zhou 12; Asts: Hu M., Liao 4 | Boxscore | Pts: Lee H. 33; Rebs: Lee H. 14; Asts: Lee J. 7 | Arena: Wukesong Arena; Attendance: 13,486; Referees: Ryan Jones (NZL), Preeda Muongmee (THA), Chan Owe Shiong (MAS) |

| 1 December 2025 | South Korea | 90–76 | China | Wonju |
| 19:00 | Scoring by quarter: 28–13, 24–16, 28–23, 10–24 |
| | Pts: Lee J. 24; Rebs: Lee H. 6 Asts: Lee S. 7 | Boxscore | Pts: Cheng 19; Rebs: Zhou 15; Asts: Liao 8 | Arena: Wonju Gymnasium; Attendance: 3,773; Referees: Glenn Cornelio (PHI), James Boyer (AUS), Leong Chuen Wing (SGP) |

| 1 December 2025 | Chinese Taipei | 73–80 | Japan | New Taipei City |
| 19:00 | Scoring by quarter: 22–17, 14–25, 21–15, 16–23 |
| | Pts: Lu 19; Rebs: Gilbeck 18; Asts: Chen, Lin T. 3 | Boxscore | Pts: Nishida 18; Rebs: Hawkinson 11; Asts: Saito 4 | Arena: Xinzhuang Gymnasium; Attendance: 6,165; Referees: Preeda Muongmee (THA), Ryan Jones (NZL), Chan Owe Shiong (MAS) |

| 26 February 2026 | Japan | 80–87 | China | Okinawa |
| 19:05 | Scoring by quarter: 21–11, 26–22, 9–25, 24–29 |
| | Pts: Nishida, Tominaga 14; Rebs: Kirk 10; Asts: Togashi 5 | Boxscore | Pts: Hu 20; Rebs: Hu 12; Asts: Liao 5 | Arena: Okinawa Arena; Attendance: 7,465; Referees: Ryan Jones (NZL), Preeda Muingmee (THA), Chuen Wing Leong (SGP) |

| 26 February 2026 | Chinese Taipei | 77–65 | South Korea | New Taipei City |
| 19:00 | Scoring by quarter: 21–18, 22–15, 17–18, 17–14 |
| | Pts: Gilbeck, Lin 18; Rebs: Gilbeck 15; Asts: Chen Y. 4 | Boxscore | Pts: Lee H. 18; Rebs: Lee S. 10; Asts: Lee J. 6 | Arena: Xinzhuang Gymnasium; Attendance: 5,738; Referees: James Boyer (AUS), Glenn Cornelio (PHI), Nattapong Jontapa (THA) |

| 1 March 2026 | Japan | 78–72 | South Korea | Okinawa |
| 14:00 | Scoring by quarter: 15–16, 27–22, 12–17, 24–17 |
| | Pts: Hawkinson 24; Rebs: Watanabe 6 Asts: Baba 5 | Boxscore | Pts: Lee H. 28; Rebs: Lee H. 11; Asts: Lee J. 5 | Arena: Okinawa Arena; Attendance: 7,821; Referees: Preeda Muongmee (THA), Ryan Jones (NZL), Chan Owe Shiong (MAS) |

| 1 March 2026 | Chinese Taipei | 93–100 | China | Pasay, Philippines (Note: FIBA decided to move games involving China and Chinese Taipei on 1 March and 6 July 2026 to a neutral venue.) |
| 16:00 | Scoring by quarter: 22–27, 29–23, 26–21, 16–29 |
| | Pts: Chen Y. 26; Rebs: Gilbeck 11; Asts: Chen Y., Gilbeck 4 | Boxscore | Pts: Zhu 19; Rebs: Li 11; Asts: Zhao R. 5 | Arena: SM Mall of Asia Arena; Attendance: 1,508; Referees: Glenn Cornelio (PHI), James Boyer (AUS), Suebpong Wichaiphin (THA) |

| 3 July 2026 | South Korea | 80–82(OT) | Chinese Taipei | Goyang |
| 19:30 | Scoring by quarter: 25–17, 16–13, 24–19, 10–26, Overtime: 5–7 |
| | Pts: Yeo 15; Rebs: Jang 10; Asts: Byeon 8 | Boxscore | Pts: Gilbeck 26; Rebs: Gilbeck 18; Asts: Hu 5 | Arena: Goyang Gymnasium; Attendance: 6,289; Referees: Glenn Cornelio (PHI), Ryan Jones (NZL), Yuen Chun Yip (HKG) |

| 3 July 2026 | China | 73–92 | Japan | Shenyang |
| 19:30 | Scoring by quarter: 21–22, 19–28, 19–24, 14–18 |
| | Pts: Hu 15; Rebs: Yang, Zhu 7 Asts: Liao, Zhao 4 | Boxscore | Pts: Hawkinson 27; Rebs: Baba 10; Asts: Saito 7 | Arena: Liaoning Gymnasium; Attendance: 11,000; Referees: James Boyer (AUS), James Griguol (AUS), Alexey Stepanenko (KAZ) |

| 6 July 2026 | China | 92–74 | Chinese Taipei | Goyang, South Korea |
| 15:00 | Scoring by quarter: 25–13, 29–15, 18–20, 20–26 |
| | Pts: Li, Zhao 17; Rebs: Hu, Zhu 6 Asts: Zhao 6 | Boxscore | Pts: Lin 28; Rebs: Gilbeck 10; Asts: Chen Y. 7 | Arena: Goyang Gymnasium; Attendance: 1,523; Referees: James Griguol (AUS), Glenn Cornelio (PHI), Alexey Stepanenko (KAZ) |

| 6 July 2026 | South Korea | 81–79 | Japan | Goyang |
| 19:30 | Scoring by quarter: 25–25, 10–12, 20–17, 26–25 |
| | Pts: Lee W. 19; Rebs: Yeo 8 Asts: Byeon 5 | Boxscore | Pts: Hawkinson 30; Rebs: Hawkinson 12; Asts: Saito 7 | Arena: Goyang Gymnasium; Attendance: 6,298; Referees: James Alexander Boyer (AUS), Chun Yip Yuen (HKG), Ryan Jones (NZL) |

==== Group C ====
| Pos | Team | Pld | W | L | PF | PA | PD | Pts | Qualification |
|---|---|---|---|---|---|---|---|---|---|
| 1 | Iran | 6 | 5 | 1 | 452 | 381 | +71 | 11 (Note: Iran 127–122 Jordan) | Second round |
| 2 | Jordan | 6 | 5 | 1 | 510 | 360 | +150 | 11 | Second round |
| 3 | Syria | 6 | 2 | 4 | 396 | 470 | −74 | 8 | Second round |
| 4 | Iraq | 6 | 0 | 6 | 416 | 563 | −147 | 6 | |

Source: FIBA
Rules for classification: 1) Points; 2) Head-to-head results; 3) Points difference; 4) Points scored.
Notes:

| 27 November 2025 | Iran | 94–68 | Iraq | Zouk Mikael, Lebanon (Note: Due to the Iran–Israel conflict, Iran will play their home games at neutral venues.) |
| 16:00 | Scoring by quarter: 24–19, 25–8, 27–19, 18–22 |
| | Pts: Vahedi 21; Rebs: Kazemi 10; Asts: Sheikhi, Yakhchali 6 | Boxscore | Pts: Galloway 20; Rebs: Alibraheemi 9 Asts: Abdulqader, Al-Zuhairi 2 | Arena: Nouhad Nawfal Sports Complex; Attendance: 36; Referees: Yevgeniy Mikheyev (KAZ), Issam Al-Siyabi (OMA), Alexey Stepanenko (KAZ) |

| 27 November 2025 | Jordan | 74–59 | Syria | Amman |
| 19:30 | Scoring by quarter: 22–12, 21–21, 15–14, 16–12 |
| | Pts: Harris 22; Rebs: Al-Dwairi 10; Asts: Al-Dwairi, Ibrahim 5 | Boxscore | Pts: Davis 23; Rebs: Davis 9 Asts: Davis 4 | Arena: Prince Hamza Hall; Attendance: 2,250; Referees: Rabah Noujaim (LBN), Taha Al-Hashedi (YEM), Paul Skayem (LBN) |

| 30 November 2025 | Iraq | 71–86 | Iran | Zouk Mikael, Lebanon (Note: Due to the Iran–Israel conflict, Iraq will play their home games at neutral venues.) |
| 16:00 | Scoring by quarter: 25–21, 13–21, 12–19, 21–25 |
| | Pts: Galloway 19; Rebs: Al-Zuhairi 7 Asts: Galloway 6 | Boxscore | Pts: Grigorian 21; Rebs: Kazemi 8 Asts: Jafari 9 | Arena: Nouhad Nawfal Sports Complex; Attendance: 35; Referees: Rabah Noujaim (LBN), Taha Al-Hashedi (YEM), Paul Skayem (LBN) |

| 30 November 2025 | Syria | 48–100 | Jordan | Amman, Jordan (Note: Due to the Israeli invasion of Syria and the Syrian post-civil war conflict, Syria will play their home games at neutral venues.) |
| 18:00 | Scoring by quarter: 6–22, 15–27, 13–21, 14–30 |
| | Pts: Michelsson 12; Rebs: Davis 10; Asts: Michelsson 4 | Boxscore | Pts: Harris 42; Rebs: Al-Hamarsheh 8 Asts: Ibrahim 5 | Arena: Prince Hamza Hall; Attendance: 1,900; Referees: Yevgeniy Mikheyev (KAZ), Issam Al-Siyabi (OMA), Alexey Stepanenko (KAZ) |

| 27 February 2026 | Iraq | 70–78 | Syria | Zouk Mikael, Lebanon (Note: Iraq were required to play their home games at neutral venues due to security concerns relating to Kata'ib Hezbollah and al-Ḥashd ash-Shaʿbī's roles in the 2026 Iran massacres.) |
| 15:00 | Scoring by quarter: 18–17, 15–18, 19–21, 18–22 |
| | Pts: Al-Zuhairi 15; Rebs: Zewki 12; Asts: Al-Yousif, Galloway 5 | Boxscore | Pts: McGill 34; Rebs: Atli 15; Asts: McGill 4 | Arena: Nouhad Nawfal Sports Complex; Attendance: 87; Referees: Rabah Noujaim (LBN), Taha Al-Hashedi (YEM), Issam Al-Siyabi (OMA) |

| 27 February 2026 | Iran | 60–73 | Jordan | Zouk Mikael, Lebanon (Note: Iran were required to play their home games at neutral venues due to security concerns relating to the 2026 Iran massacres.) |
| 18:00 | Scoring by quarter: 14–18, 11–11, 18–17, 17–27 |
| | Pts: Aghajanpour 13; Rebs: Kazemi 12; Asts: Jafari 9 | Boxscore | Pts: Harris 29; Rebs: Ibrahim 8 Asts: Ibrahim 6 | Arena: Nouhad Nawfal Sports Complex; Attendance: 100; Referees: Budi Marfan (INA), Paul Skayem (LBN), Alexey Stepanenko (KAZ) |

| 29 June 2026 (Note: The games scheduled for 2 March 2026 were postponed due to the 2026 Iran war.) | Iran | 72–68 | Syria | Amman, Jordan (Note: Iran were required to play their home games at neutral venues due to security concerns relating to the 2026 Iran massacres and 2026 Iran War.) |
| 16:30 | Scoring by quarter: 21–12, 17–19, 12–25, 22–12 |
| | Pts: Grigorian 18; Rebs: Kazemi 12; Asts: Sheikhi 6 | Boxscore | Pts: McGill 19; Rebs: Atli 6 Asts: Atli 5 | Arena: Prince Hamza Hall; Attendance: 46; Referees: Rabah Noujaim (LBN), Budi Marfan (INA), Issam Al-Siyabi (OMA) |

| 29 June 2026 | Iraq | 59–108 | Jordan | Amman, Jordan (Note: Iraq were required to play their home games at neutral venues due to security concerns relating to Kata'ib Hezbollah and al-Ḥashd ash-Shaʿbī's roles in 2026 Iran War and 2026 Iran massacres.) |
| 19:30 | Scoring by quarter: 23–28, 10–29, 14–26, 12–15 |
| | Pts: Hammoodi 14; Rebs: Al-Zuhairi 5 Asts: Al-Yousif 8 | Boxscore | Pts: Harris 23; Rebs: Saleh 11; Asts: Ibrahim 8 | Arena: Prince Hamza Hall; Attendance: 1,151; Referees: Preeda Muongmee (THA), Paul Skayem (LBN), Lee Kyoung-hwan (KOR) |

| 2 July 2026 | Syria | 91–81 | Iraq | Amman, Jordan |
| 16:30 | Scoring by quarter: 15–16, 31–24, 21–18, 24–23 |
| | Pts: McGill 27; Rebs: Abdullah, Atli 6 Asts: Atli 6 | Boxscore | Pts: Al-Yousif 16; Rebs: three players 6 Asts: Al-Yousif 7 | Arena: Prince Hamza Hall; Attendance: 70; Referees: Rabah Noujaim (LBN), Budi Marfan (INA), Nattapong Jontapa (THA) |

| 2 July 2026 | Jordan | 49–67 | Iran | Amman |
| 19:30 | Scoring by quarter: 11–17, 11–12, 8–23, 19–15 |
| | Pts: Harris 18; Rebs: Al-Dwairi 11; Asts: Ibrahim 5 | Boxscore | Pts: Heidari 17; Rebs: Kazemi 11; Asts: Kazemi 7 | Arena: Prince Hamza Hall; Attendance: 1,750; Referees: Preeda Muongmee (THA), Paul Skayem (LBN), Lee Kyoung-hwan (KOR) |

| 5 July 2026 | Syria | 52–73 | Iran | Amman, Jordan |
| 16:30 | Scoring by quarter: 5–17, 15–14, 10–23, 22–19 |
| | Pts: McGill 15; Rebs: Atli 6 Asts: Cheikh Ali 3 | Boxscore | Pts: Aghajanpour 13; Rebs: Kazemi 11; Asts: Jafari 7 | Arena: Prince Hamza Hall; Attendance: 42; Referees: Rabah Noujaim (LBN), Preeda Muongmee (THA), Haruga Iwai (JPN) |

| 5 July 2026 | Jordan | 106–67 | Iraq | Amman |
| 19:30 | Scoring by quarter: 27–10, 33–23, 24–20, 22–14 |
| | Pts: Harris 28; Rebs: Alshami, Saleh 5 Asts: Ibrahim 6 | Boxscore | Pts: Zewki 18; Rebs: Zewki 7 Asts: Ismael 5 | Arena: Prince Hamza Hall; Attendance: 870; Referees: Budi Marfan (INA), Nattapong Jontapa (THA), Paul Skayem (LBN) |

==== Group D ====
| Pos | Team | Pld | W | L | PF | PA | PD | Pts | Qualification |
|---|---|---|---|---|---|---|---|---|---|
| 1 | Lebanon | 6 | 5 | 1 | 537 | 434 | +103 | 11 | Second round |
| 2 | Qatar | 6 | 4 | 2 | 480 | 446 | +34 | 10 | Second round as host of the final tournament |
| 3 | Saudi Arabia | 6 | 3 | 3 | 461 | 446 | +15 | 9 | Second round |
| 4 | India | 6 | 0 | 6 | 365 | 517 | −152 | 6 | |

Source: FIBA
Rules for classification: 1) Points; 2) Head-to-head results; 3) Points difference; 4) Points scored.

| 27 November 2025 | Qatar | 74–75 | Lebanon | Lusail |
| 19:00 | Scoring by quarter: 9–21, 17–12, 17–17, 31–25 |
| | Pts: Hadžibegović 19; Rebs: Hadžibegović 11; Asts: Goodwin 7 | Boxscore | Pts: Arakji 19; Rebs: Lawson 12; Asts: El Darwich 6 | Arena: Lusail Multipurpose Hall; Attendance: 6,600; Referees: Wissam Zein (SYR), Sadegh Ghanbari (IND), Ahmad Al-Yousef (JOR) |

| 27 November 2025 | Saudi Arabia | 75–51 | India | Riyadh |
| 19:00 | Scoring by quarter: 28–16, 17–16, 16–11, 14–8 |
| | Pts: Abdur-Rahkman 23; Rebs: Al-Suwailem 9 Asts: Abdur-Rahkman 6 | Boxscore | Pts: Dagar 10; Rebs: Prince 9 Asts: Sekhon 4 | Arena: Riyadh Green Hall; Attendance: 1,648; Referees: Ahmed Al-Shuwaili (IRQ), Mohammad Taha (JOR), Hadi Salem (IRI) |

| 30 November 2025 | India | 57–81 | Saudi Arabia | Chennai |
| 18:00 | Scoring by quarter: 9–19, 12–24, 15–26, 21–12 |
| | Pts: Sandhu 19; Rebs: four players 5 Asts: Prince 4 | Boxscore | Pts: Abdur-Rahkman 24; Rebs: Al-Suwailem 9 Asts: Al-Muwallad 5 | Arena: Nehru Indoor Stadium; Attendance: 3,000; Referees: Wissam Zein (SYR), Sadegh Ghanbari (IND), Ahmad Al-Yousef (JOR) |

| 30 November 2025 | Lebanon | 83–86 | Qatar | Zouk Mikael |
| 21:00 | Scoring by quarter: 19–14, 19–21, 17–25, 28–26 |
| | Pts: Arakji 21; Rebs: Lawson 11; Asts: Arakji 8 | Boxscore | Pts: Goodwin 25; Rebs: Hadžibegović 12; Asts: Goodwin 8 | Arena: Nouhad Nawfal Sports Complex; Attendance: 5,777; Referees: Ahmed Al-Shuwaili (IRQ), Mohammad Taha (JOR), Hadi Salem (IRI) |

| 27 February 2026 | Lebanon | 94–64 | Saudi Arabia | Zouk Mikael |
| 21:00 | Scoring by quarter: 26–17, 25–16, 28–13, 15–18 |
| | Pts: Arakji 18; Rebs: Lawson 13; Asts: Lawson 6 | Boxscore | Pts: Abdur-Rahkman 20; Rebs: Al-Marwani 8 Asts: Abdel-Gabar, Belal 4 | Arena: Nouhad Nawfal Sports Complex; Attendance: 5,934; Referees: Ahmed Al-Shuwaili (IRQ), Wissam Zein (SYR), Hadi Salem (IRI) |

| 27 February 2026 | Qatar | 99–73 | India | Lusail |
| 22:00 | Scoring by quarter: 28–17, 17–26, 30–9, 24–21 |
| | Pts: Goodwin 23; Rebs: Harris 7 Asts: Fouda 5 | Boxscore | Pts: Sandhu 15; Rebs: Prince 11; Asts: Prince 6 | Arena: Lusail Multipurpose Hall; Attendance: 689; Referees: Yevgeniy Mikheyev (KAZ), Sadegh Ghanbari (IND), Mohammad Taha (JOR) |

| 29 June 2026 | Qatar | 80–86 | Saudi Arabia | Doha |
| 19:00 | Scoring by quarter: 20–29, 15–17, 24–22, 21–18 |
| | Pts: Hadžibegović 25; Rebs: Hadžibegović 8 Asts: Fouda 6 | Boxscore | Pts: Abdur-Rahkman 28; Rebs: Al-Suwailem 13; Asts: Abdel-Gabar 8 | Arena: Al-Gharafa Sports Club Multi-Purpose Hall; Attendance: 330; Referees: Mohammad Taha (JOR), Taha Al-Hashedi (YEM), Ahmad Al-Yousef (JOR) |

| 29 June 2026 | Lebanon | 99–56 | India | Zouk Mikael |
| 21:00 | Scoring by quarter: 25–13, 28–16, 25–14, 21–13 |
| | Pts: El Khatib, Gyokchyan 16; Rebs: Majok 8 Asts: El Darwich 6 | Boxscore | Pts: Dagar 14; Rebs: Prince 8 Asts: Krishnan 5 | Arena: Nouhad Nawfal Sports Complex; Attendance: 2,732; Referees: Wissam Zein (SYR), Ahmed Al-Shuwaili (IRQ), Hadi Salem (IRI) |

| 2 July 2026 | India | 56–65 | Qatar | Ahmedabad |
| 18:00 | Scoring by quarter: 12–7, 18–15, 14–20, 12–23 |
| | Pts: Dagar, Prince 13; Rebs: Prince 12; Asts: Dagar, Prince 4 | Boxscore | Pts: Saad 24; Rebs: Magassa 13; Asts: Saad 3 | Arena: Veer Savarkar Indoor Stadium; Attendance: 3,587; Referees: Wissam Zein (SYR), Sadegh Ghanbari (IND), Suebpong Wichaiphin (THA) |

| 2 July 2026 | Saudi Arabia | 82–88 | Lebanon | Jeddah |
| 20:00 | Scoring by quarter: 19–22, 23–19, 24–22, 16–25 |
| | Pts: Al-Suwailem 20; Rebs: Al-Suwailem 16; Asts: Abdur-Rahkman 3 | Boxscore | Pts: Saoud 25; Rebs: Jamaleddine 8 Asts: Mansour 4 | Arena: King Abdullah Sports City Stadium; Attendance: 4,217; Referees: Ahmed Al-Shuwaili (IRQ), Mohammad Taha (JOR), Hadi Salem (IRI) |

| 5 July 2026 | Saudi Arabia | 73–76 | Qatar | Jeddah |
| 18:00 | Scoring by quarter: 18–17, 15–15, 21–15, 19–29 |
| | Pts: Abdur-Rahkman 19; Rebs: Alsuwailem 9 Asts: Abdur-Rahkman 7 | Boxscore | Pts: Hadžibegović 21; Rebs: Grantham 9 Asts: Fouda 8 | Arena: King Abdullah Sports City Stadium; Attendance: 1,152; Referees: Ahmed Al-Shuwaili (IRQ), Hadi Salem (IRI), Mohammad Taha (JOR) |

| 5 July 2026 | India | 72–98 | Lebanon | Ahmedabad |
| 20:30 | Scoring by quarter: 15–28, 23–20, 16–27, 19–23 |
| | Pts: Muthu Krishnan 17; Rebs: Prince 8 Asts: Muthu Krishnan 7 | Boxscore | Pts: El Darwich 19; Rebs: Hadidian, Mezher 6 Asts: Mezher 15 | Arena: Veer Savarkar Indoor Stadium; Attendance: 4,597; Referees: Wissam Zein (SYR), Sadegh Ghanbari (IND), Suebpong Wichaiphin (THA) |

=== Second round ===
The twelve qualified teams will be divided into two groups and play the other three teams from the other group twice. Group A will be paired with Group C and Group B with Group D. All results from the first round will be carried over.

A total of eight Asian teams will qualify for the World Cup, with Qatar qualifying automatically as the host. Qatar's results in the second round will count toward the standings, but the team will be excluded from the final rankings. The top three teams from each group will qualify directly, while the fourth-placed teams from Groups E and F will be ranked against each other, with the better-ranked team claiming the final Asian qualification spot.

==== Group E ====
| Pos | Team | Pld | W | L | PF | PA | PD | Pts | Qualification |
|---|---|---|---|---|---|---|---|---|---|
| 1 | Australia | 8 | 8 | 0 | 814 | 560 | +254 | 16 | 2027 FIBA Basketball World Cup |
| 2 | New Zealand | 8 | 6 | 2 | 778 | 638 | +140 | 14 | 2027 FIBA Basketball World Cup |
| 3 | Iran | 8 | 5 | 3 | 599 | 542 | +57 | 13 (Note: Iran 127–122 Jordan) | 2027 FIBA Basketball World Cup |
| 4 | Jordan | 8 | 5 | 3 | 684 | 568 | +116 | 13 | Best fourth placed team |
| 5 | Philippines | 8 | 4 | 4 | 615 | 614 | +1 | 12 | |
| 6 | Syria | 8 | 2 | 6 | 534 | 719 | −185 | 10 | |

Updated to game(s) played on 30 August 2026. Source: FIBA
Rules for classification: 1) Points; 2) Head-to-head results; 3) Points difference; 4) Points scored.
Notes:

| 28 August 2026 | Iran | 91–93(OT) | New Zealand | Pasay, Philippines |
| 14:00 | Scoring by quarter: 19–21, 20–17, 22–28, 19–14, Overtime: 11–13 |
| | Pts: Aghajanpour 19; Rebs: Kazemi 9 Asts: Jafari 6 | Boxscore | Pts: Ili 24; Rebs: Mennenga 13; Asts: Ili 6 | Arena: SM Mall of Asia Arena; Attendance: 400; Referees: Yevgeniy Mikheyev (KAZ), Ahmed Al-Shuwaili (IRQ), Preeda Muongmee (THA) |

| 28 August 2026 | Syria | 64–123 | Australia | Pasay, Philippines |
| 17:00 | Scoring by quarter: 16–27, 11–36, 16–30, 21–30 |
| | Pts: Justice 21; Rebs: three players 3 Asts: Alkordy, Justice 4 | Boxscore | Pts: Pepper 32; Rebs: Bannan, Holt 8 Asts: Daniels, Froling 4 | Arena: SM Mall of Asia Arena; Attendance: 599; Referees: Daigo Urushima (JPN), Jiang Wenan (CHN), Park Kyoung-jin (KOR) |

| 28 August 2026 | Jordan | 81–82(OT) | Philippines | Pasay, Philippines |
| 20:30 | Scoring by quarter: 28–14, 16–25, 14–15, 14–18, Overtime: 9–10 |
| | Pts: Ibrahim 22; Rebs: Al-Dwairi 11; Asts: Ibrahim 5 | Boxscore | Pts: Sotto 18; Rebs: Sotto 14; Asts: Gómez de Liaño 6 | Arena: SM Mall of Asia Arena; Attendance: 12,294; Referees: Rabah Noujaim (LBN), Alexey Stepanenko (KAZ), Chuang Chih-chun (TPE) |

| 30 August 2026 | New Zealand | 126–74 | Syria | Pasay, Philippines |
| 14:00 | Scoring by quarter: 31–19, 34–24, 34–12, 27–19 |
| | Pts: C. Webster 22; Rebs: Timmins, Yates 6 Asts: T. Webster 9 | Boxscore | Pts: Justice 22; Rebs: Justice, Maran 5 Asts: Justice 5 | Arena: SM Mall of Asia Arena; Attendance: 2,699; Referees: Daigo Urushima (JPN), Jiang Wenan (CHN), Park Kyoung-jin (KOR) |

| 30 August 2026 | Australia | 126–93 | Jordan | Pasay, Philippines |
| 17:00 | Scoring by quarter: 29–16, 34–25, 28–23, 35–29 |
| | Pts: Dell'Orso 19; Rebs: Holt 9 Asts: Travers 10 | Boxscore | Pts: Abu Hawwas 21; Rebs: Saleh 8 Asts: Harris, Ibrahim 3 | Arena: SM Mall of Asia Arena; Attendance: 9,653; Referees: Ahmed Al-Shuwaili (IRQ), Preeda Muongmee (THA), Chuang Chih-chun (TPE) |

| 30 August 2026 | Philippines | 68–56 | Iran | Pasay |
| 20:00 | Scoring by quarter: 7–18, 29–16, 13–13, 19–9 |
| | Pts: Gómez de Liaño, Ramos 16; Rebs: Sotto 16; Asts: Sotto, Thompson 3 | Boxscore | Pts: Sheikhi 21; Rebs: three players 7 Asts: Amini 5 | Arena: SM Mall of Asia Arena; Attendance: 18,308; Referees: Rabah Noujaim (LBN), Yevgeniy Mikheyev (KAZ), Alexey Stepanenko (KAZ) |

| 27 November 2026 | Jordan | vs. | New Zealand | Seremban, Malaysia |
| 14:00 |
| | | Boxscore | | Arena: Karisma Arena |

| 27 November 2026 | Iran | vs. | Australia | Seremban, Malaysia |
| 17:00 |
| | | Boxscore | | Arena: Karisma Arena |

| 27 November 2026 | Syria | vs. | Philippines | Seremban, Malaysia |
| 20:00 |
| | | Boxscore | | Arena: Karisma Arena |

| 29 November 2026 | Syria | vs. | New Zealand | Seremban, Malaysia |
| 14:00 |
| | | Boxscore | | Arena: Karisma Arena |

| 29 November 2026 | Iran | vs. | Philippines | Seremban, Malaysia |
| 17:00 |
| | | Boxscore | | Arena: Karisma Arena |

| 29 November 2026 | Jordan | vs. | Australia | Seremban, Malaysia |
| 20:00 |
| | | Boxscore | | Arena: Karisma Arena |

| 26 February 2027 | Australia | vs. | Syria | Cebu City, Philippines |
| | | Boxscore | | Arena: SM Seaside Cebu Arena |

| 26 February 2027 | New Zealand | vs. | Iran | Cebu City, Philippines |
| | | Boxscore | | Arena: SM Seaside Cebu Arena |

| 26 February 2027 | Philippines | vs. | Jordan | Cebu City |
| | | Boxscore | | Arena: SM Seaside Cebu Arena |

| 1 March 2027 | Australia | vs. | Iran | Cebu City, Philippines |
| | | Boxscore | | Arena: SM Seaside Cebu Arena |

| 1 March 2027 | New Zealand | vs. | Jordan | Cebu City, Philippines |
| | | Boxscore | | Arena: SM Seaside Cebu Arena |

| 1 March 2027 | Philippines | vs. | Syria | Cebu City |
| | | Boxscore | | Arena: SM Seaside Cebu Arena |

==== Group F ====
| Pos | Team | Pld | W | L | PF | PA | PD | Pts | Qualification |
|---|---|---|---|---|---|---|---|---|---|
| 1 | Japan | 8 | 6 | 2 | 728 | 598 | +130 | 14 | 2027 FIBA Basketball World Cup |
| 2 | Lebanon | 8 | 6 | 2 | 717 | 597 | +120 | 14 | 2027 FIBA Basketball World Cup |
| 3 | China | 8 | 5 | 3 | 676 | 653 | +23 | 13 | 2027 FIBA Basketball World Cup |
| 4 | South Korea | 8 | 4 | 4 | 627 | 633 | −6 | 12 | Best fourth placed team |
| 5 | Qatar | 8 | 4 | 4 | 607 | 652 | −45 | 12 | 2027 FIBA Basketball World Cup as hosts |
| 6 | Saudi Arabia | 8 | 3 | 5 | 611 | 637 | −26 | 11 | |

Updated to game(s) played on 31 August 2026. Source: FIBA
Rules for classification: 1) Points; 2) Head-to-head results; 3) Points difference; 4) Points scored.

| 27 August 2026 | Qatar | 57–83 | China | Al Wakrah |
| 19:00 | Scoring by quarter: 13–23, 23–24, 12–19, 9–17 |
| | Pts: Lewis 14; Rebs: Dieng 5 Asts: Fouda 5 | Boxscore | Pts: Yang 15; Rebs: Yang 9 Asts: Hu M., Liao 4 | Arena: Al Janoub Stadium; Attendance: 6,985; Referees: Ruben Woolcock (AUS), Martin Davison (NZL), Taha Al-Hashedi (YEM) |

| 27 August 2026 | Saudi Arabia | 78–106 | Japan | Jeddah |
| 20:00 | Scoring by quarter: 22–33, 18–23, 12–34, 26–16 |
| | Pts: Al-Suwailem 19; Rebs: Al-Suwailem 16; Asts: Al-Suwailem 7 | Boxscore | Pts: Hachimura 29; Rebs: four players 4 Asts: Kawamura 9 | Arena: King Abdullah Sports City Stadium; Attendance: 2,065; Referees: James Griguol (AUS), Leong Chuen Wing (SGP), Hadi Salem (IRI) |

| 27 August 2026 | Lebanon | 93–74 | South Korea | Zouk Mikael |
| 21:00 | Scoring by quarter: 18–24, 20–17, 25–19, 30–14 |
| | Pts: Khayat 21; Rebs: Jamaleddine 9 Asts: Mezher 8 | Boxscore | Pts: Yeo 19; Rebs: Lee W. 8 Asts: Lee S., Lee W. 4 | Arena: Nouhad Nawfal Sports Complex; Attendance: 5,121; Referees: Wissam Zein (SYR), Sadegh Ghanbari (IND), Chan Owe Shiong (MAS) |

| 31 August 2026 | South Korea | 85–72 | Saudi Arabia | Suwon |
| 19:00 | Scoring by quarter: 19–16, 23–15, 22–20, 21–21 |
| | Pts: Lee H. 25; Rebs: Lee H. 10; Asts: Byeon, Lee H. 6 | Boxscore | Pts: Al-Suwailem 31; Rebs: Al-Suwailem 13; Asts: Al-Suwailem 5 | Arena: KT Sonicboom Arena; Attendance: 2,543; Referees: Mohammad Taha (JOR), Nattapong Jontapa (THA), Travis Stewart (AUS) |

| 31 August 2026 | Japan | 123–70 | Qatar | Tokyo |
| 19:10 | Scoring by quarter: 29–11, 24–23, 40–11, 30–25 |
| | Pts: Hachimura 30; Rebs: Hawkinson 8 Asts: Kawamura 10 | Boxscore | Pts: Mousa 14; Rebs: Abbasher 8 Asts: Abdelhaleem 4 | Arena: Toyota Arena Tokyo; Attendance: 9,153; Referees: Glenn Cornelio (PHI), Yuen Chun Yip (HKG), Ryan Jones (NZL) |

| 31 August 2026 | China | 89–87 | Lebanon | Zhuji |
| 19:30 | Scoring by quarter: 23–14, 23–28, 21–27, 22–18 |
| | Pts: Yang 19; Rebs: Yang 9 Asts: Zhao Jiw. 5 | Boxscore | Pts: Jamaleddine 19; Rebs: Jamaleddine 11; Asts: El Darwich 5 | Arena: Xishi Basketball Center; Attendance: 12,127; Referees: James Boyer (AUS), Budi Marfan (INA), Suebpong Wichaiphin (THA) |

| 26 November 2026 | Saudi Arabia | vs. | China | Al Wakrah, Qatar |
| 16:00 |
| | | Boxscore | | Arena: Al Janoub Stadium |

| 26 November 2026 | Qatar | vs. | South Korea | Al Wakrah |
| 19:00 |
| | | Boxscore | | Arena: Al Janoub Stadium |

| 26 November 2026 | Lebanon | vs. | Japan | Zouk Mikael |
| 21:00 |
| | | Boxscore | | Arena: Nouhad Nawfal Sports Complex |

| 29 November 2026 | Qatar | vs. | Japan | Al Wakrah |
| 16:00 |
| | | Boxscore | | Arena: Al Janoub Stadium |

| 29 November 2026 | Saudi Arabia | vs. | South Korea | Al Wakrah, Qatar |
| 19:00 |
| | | Boxscore | | Arena: Al Janoub Stadium |

| 29 November 2026 | Lebanon | vs. | China | Zouk Mikael |
| 21:00 |
| | | Boxscore | | Arena: Nouhad Nawfal Sports Complex |

| 26 February 2027 | Japan | vs. | Saudi Arabia |
| | | Boxscore |

| 26 February 2027 | South Korea | vs. | Lebanon |
| | | Boxscore |

| 26 February 2027 | China | vs. | Qatar |
| | | Boxscore |

| 1 March 2027 | Japan | vs. | Lebanon |
| | | Boxscore |

| 1 March 2027 | South Korea | vs. | Qatar |
| | | Boxscore |

| 1 March 2027 | China | vs. | Saudi Arabia |
| | | Boxscore |

==== Best fourth placed team ====
| Pos | Grp | Team | Pld | W | L | PF | PA | PD | Pts | Qualification |
|---|---|---|---|---|---|---|---|---|---|---|
| 1 | E | Jordan | 8 | 5 | 3 | 684 | 568 | +116 | 13 | 2027 FIBA Basketball World Cup |
| 2 | F | South Korea | 8 | 4 | 4 | 627 | 633 | −6 | 12 | |

Updated to game(s) played on 31 August 2026. Source: FIBA
