= 2017–18 Kansas Jayhawks men's basketball team =

American college basketball season

2017–18 Kansas Jayhawks men's basketball

Big 12 tournament champions (Vacated) Big 12 regular season champions (Vacated) Hoop Hall Miami Invitational champions

NCAA tournament, Final Four (Vacated)
- Conference: Big 12 Conference

Ranking
- Coaches: No. 3
- AP: No. 4
- Record: 16–8, 15 wins vacated (2–5 Big 12, 11 wins vacated)
- Head coach: Bill Self (15th season)
- Assistant coaches: Jerrance Howard (5th season); Norm Roberts (7th season); Kurtis Townsend (14th season)
- Home arena: Allen Fieldhouse

2017–18 Big 12 men's basketball standings
	Conf.				Overall
Team	W		L	PCT	W		L	PCT
No. 4 Kansas †	13	–	5	.722	31	–	8	.795
No. 14 Texas Tech	11	–	7	.611	27	–	10	.730
No. 15 West Virginia	11	–	7	.611	26	–	11	.703
Kansas State	10	–	8	.556	25	–	12	.676
TCU	9	–	9	.500	21	–	12	.636
Baylor	8	–	10	.444	19	–	15	.559
Texas	8	–	10	.444	19	–	15	.559
Oklahoma State	8	–	10	.444	21	–	15	.583
Oklahoma	8	–	10	.444	18	–	14	.563
Iowa State	4	–	14	.222	13	–	18	.419
† 2018 Big 12 Tournament winner Rankings from AP poll

The 2017–18 Kansas Jayhawks men's basketball team represented the University of Kansas in the 2017–18 NCAA Division I men's basketball season, which was the Jayhawks' 120th basketball season. The Jayhawks, were members of the Big 12 Conference and played their home games at Allen Fieldhouse in Lawrence, Kansas. They were led by 15th year Hall of Fame head coach Bill Self.

On October 22, the Jayhawks renewed their rivalry against Missouri in an exhibition game for charity. The proceeds of the game went to four different charities for Hurricane Harvey and Hurricane Maria relief funds. It was the first time the teams played since Missouri left the Big 12 for the SEC.

The Jayhawks entered the season ranked 4th, their 162nd consecutive poll they have been ranked in. During the season, they extended the streak to, as of the poll released on March 12, 2018, 180 consecutive polls. The last game KU played as unranked team was a 66–61 win over Colorado on January 31, 2009. With their 74–72 win over Texas Tech on February 24, 2018, the Jayhawks clinched their NCAA record 14th consecutive Big 12 regular season championship. The season marked the first time the Jayhawks have ever been swept in the regular season by an opponent under Bill Self, ending what was a streak of 103 home and home series without a sweep dating back to 2001. The Jayhawks lost to Self's alma mater Oklahoma State twice. With 3:49 left in the 2nd half of their Big 12 Tournament Quarterfinal game against Oklahoma State, red-shirt sophomore guard Malik Newman made a 3-point shot. That 3 point was the Jayhawks school record 319th made 3 point shot in the season, breaking a record the Jayhawks set the previous season.

They received an automatic bid to the NCAA tournament as the No. 1 seed in the Midwest region. There they defeated Penn, Seton Hall, Clemson, and Duke to advance to the Final Four. In the Final Four, they lost to No. 1 seed from the East region and eventual National Champions, Villanova.

Senior guard Devonte' Graham was named a Consensus First Team All-American. He was the 23rd different player to be named a Consensus First Team All-American and the 30th overall selection in Kansas history. It was also the 2nd consecutive year Kansas had a Consensus First Team All-American.

In 2023, 15 of the Jayhawks wins, their regular season Conference Championship, their Big 12 Tournament Championship, their tournament appearance, and Final Four appearance, were all vacated for recruiting violations. Specifically games Silvio De Sousa played in were vacated; the first game he played was the home victory over Kansas State. He did not play in the games KU won at home against TCU (February 06), WVU (February 17) and at Texas Tech (February 24), so those wins were not vacated. The vacated NCAA Tournament appearance caused their NCAA record of consecutive NCAA Tournament appearances to end at 28 with their 2017 appearance being the final official appearance in the streak.

== Roster and coaching staff changes ==
=== Coaching staff changes ===
The Jayhawks did not experience any changes to their coaching staff.

=== Graduation ===
Name	Position
Frank Mason III	G
Landen Lucas	F
Tyler Self	G

=== Early draft entrants ===
==== Hired agent ====
Name	Position	Class
Josh Jackson	F	Freshman

==== Did not initially hire agent ====
Starting with the 2016 NBA draft, if a player declares for the draft, but does not hire an agent, it allows the player to return to their school even after participating in the NBA Draft Combine, as long as they withdraw from the draft no later than 10 days after the end of the combine. For the 2017 draft, the final withdrawal date to retain NCAA eligibility was May 24.

Name	Position	Class	Returned/ Entered draft
Sviatoslav Mykhailiuk	Guard	Junior	Returned

=== Transfers ===
==== Incoming ====
Name	Year	Position	Old school
Charlie Moore	Freshman	G	California
Sam Cunliffe*	Freshman	G	Arizona State
K. J. Lawson	RS Freshman	F/G	Memphis
Dedric Lawson	Sophomore	F/G	Memphis

*Sam Cunliffe transferred during the 2016–17 season and was eligible to play in December 2017, one year after he transferred.

==== Outgoing ====
Name	Year	Position	New school
Evan Maxwell	RS Sophomore	C	Indiana Wesleyan
Carlton Bragg Jr.	Junior	F	Arizona State
Dwight Coleby	RS Senior	F	Western Kentucky

=== Recruiting class ===
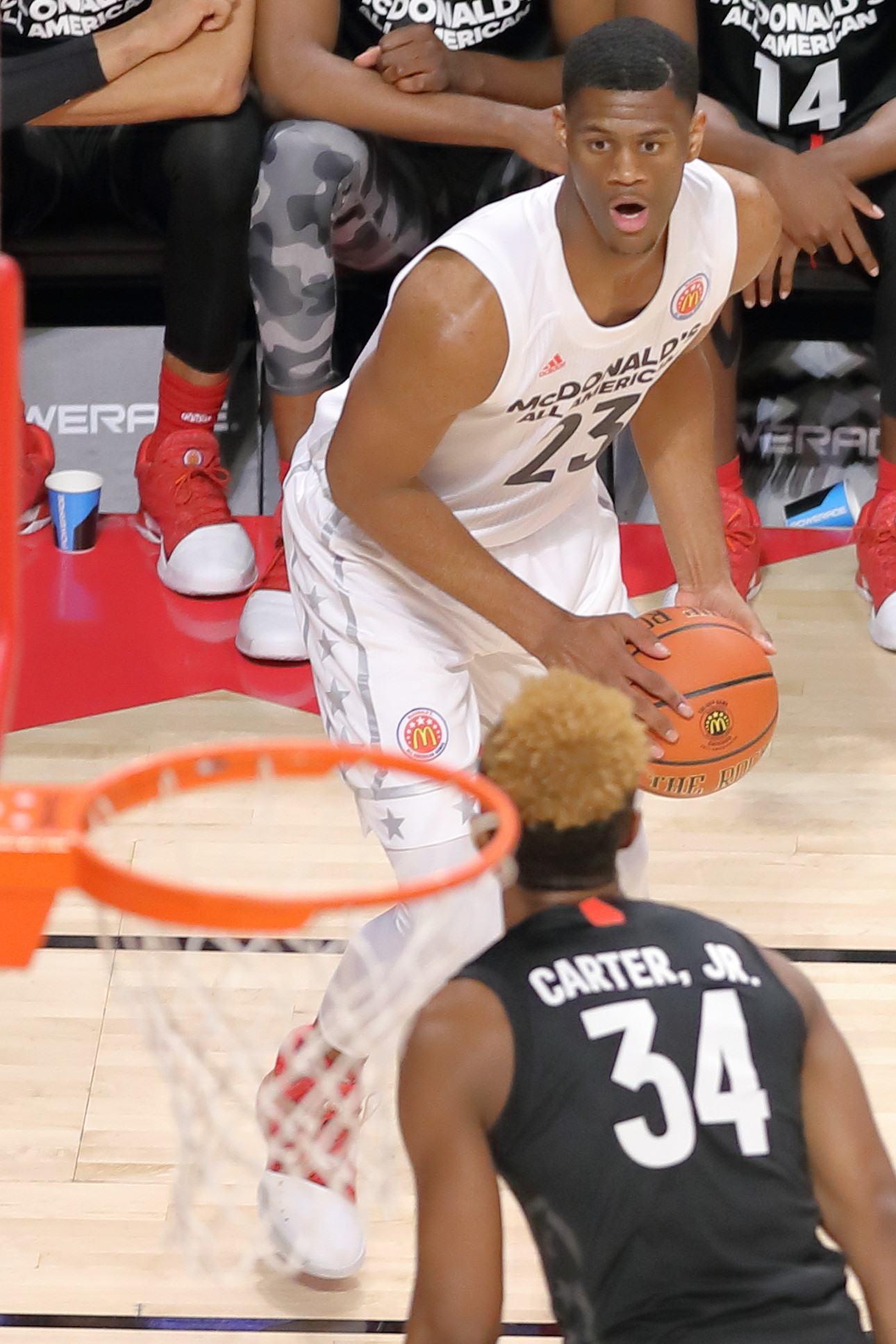
Kansas recruit Billy Preston at the 2017 McDonald's All-American Boys Game.

College recruiting
Name	Hometown	School	Height	Weight	Commit date
Billy Preston; F	Los Angeles, California	Oak Hill Academy (VA)	6 ft 10 in (2.08 m)	230 lb (100 kg)	Nov 18, 2016
Billy Preston; F	Recruit ratings: Scout: Rivals: 247Sports: ESPN:				
Silvio De Sousa*; F	Luanda, Angola	IMG Academy	6 ft 9 in (2.06 m)	242 lb (110 kg)	Aug 27, 2017
Silvio De Sousa*; F	Recruit ratings: Scout: Rivals: 247Sports: ESPN:				
Marcus Garrett; G	Dallas, Texas	Skyline High School	6 ft 5 in (1.96 m)	180 lb (82 kg)	Aug 1, 2016
Marcus Garrett; G	Recruit ratings: Scout: Rivals: 247Sports: ESPN:				
Overall recruiting rankings: Scout: 14 Rivals: 10 ESPN: 24

*Originally was recruited as a part of Kansas' 2018 recruiting class, however, De Sousa reclassified to 2017 and received approval from the NCAA to begin playing on January 13.

=== Walk-ons ===
Name	Position	Class
James Sosinski	F	RS* Sophomore

*Sosinski red-shirted on the Jayhawks football team and was invited to walk on by Bill Self. Following the season, he will have two years of eligibility remaining with the football and basketball team.

=== Left team during the season ===
Name	Position	Class	Reason
Billy Preston	F	Freshman	Signed with Bosnian pro team KK Igokea

== NCAA Corruption scandal, FBI Probe ==
On February 23, 2018, Kansas was announced as one of 27 schools that had players being investigated by the FBI's probe into corruption in college basketball which began with an investigation of Louisville and their former head coach Rick Pitino. Kansas' involvement was specifically a former player being named in Christian Dawkins' expense reports for seeking thousands of dollars of reimbursements for expenses incurred from recruits’ families. Former player Josh Jackson's mother reportedly received a $2,700 payment, which was listed in the report. Also named in the report were fellow Kansas Division I team Wichita State, Big 12 members Iowa State and Texas, as well as perennial power house programs Duke, North Carolina, Kentucky, and Michigan State.

== Roster ==
2017–18 Kansas Jayhawks men's basketball team
Players
Coaches

Pos.	#	Name	Height	Weight	Year	Hometown
G	0	Marcus Garrett	6 ft 5 in (1.96 m)	180 lb (82 kg)	Fr	Dallas, TX
F	1	Dedric Lawson (redshirt)	6 ft 9 in (2.06 m)	236 lb (107 kg)	Jr	Memphis, TN
G	2	LaGerald Vick	6 ft 5 in (1.96 m)	175 lb (79 kg)	Jr	Memphis, TN
G	3	Sam Cunliffe	6 ft 6 in (1.98 m)	200 lb (91 kg)	So	Seattle, WA
G	4	Devonte' Graham	6 ft 2 in (1.88 m)	185 lb (84 kg)	Sr	Raleigh, NC
G	5	Charlie Moore (redshirt)	5 ft 11 in (1.8 m)	170 lb (77 kg)	So	Chicago, IL
G	10	Sviatoslav Mykhailiuk	6 ft 8 in (2.03 m)	205 lb (93 kg)	Sr	Cherkasy, Ukraine
G	12	Chris Teahan (W)	6 ft 4 in (1.93 m)	170 lb (77 kg)	Fr	Kansas City, MO
F	13	K. J. Lawson (redshirt)	6 ft 7 in (2.01 m)	210 lb (95 kg)	RS So	Memphis, TN
G	14	Malik Newman	6 ft 3 in (1.91 m)	190 lb (86 kg)	RS So	Jackson, MS
G	21	Clay Young (W)	6 ft 5 in (1.96 m)	205 lb (93 kg)	RS Sr	Lansing, KS
F	22	Silvio De Sousa	6 ft 9 in (2.06 m)	245 lb (111 kg)	Fr	Luanda, Angola
C	35	Udoka Azubuike	7 ft 0 in (2.13 m)	280 lb (127 kg)	So	Delta, Nigeria
F	44	Mitch Lightfoot	6 ft 8 in (2.03 m)	210 lb (95 kg)	So	Gilbert, AZ
F	55	James Sosinski (W)	6 ft 7 in (2.01 m)	250 lb (113 kg)	RS So	Chandler, AZ

Head coach

- Bill Self (Oklahoma State)

Assistant coach(es)

- Norm Roberts (Queens (NY))
- Kurtis Townsend (Western Kentucky)
- Jerrance Howard (Illinois)

Legend

- (C) Team captain
- (S) Suspended
- (I) Ineligible
- (W) Walk-on
- Injured
- Current redshirt

Roster
Last update: April 6, 2017

== Schedule and results ==
Beginning with the home game against Kansas State, wins in games in which Silvio De Sousa played are officially vacated. He did not play in the games KU won on February 6 versus TCU, February 17 versus WVU and on February 24 at Texas Tech, so those wins were not vacated. The original results are listed in the table.

Date time, TV	Rank^{#}	Opponent^{#}	Result	Record	High points	High rebounds	High assists	Site (attendance) city, state
Italy exhibition trip
August 2, 2017*; 11:30 am		vs. A.S. Stella Azzurra	W 90–56	–	16 – Newman	4 – 4 tied	9 – Graham	Honey Sports City; Rome, Italy
August 3, 2017*; 11:30 am		vs. Players Group	W 92–61	–	15 – Azubuike	12 – Garrett	5 – Graham	Honey Sports City; Rome, Italy
August 5, 2017*; 12:00 pm		vs. Players Group	W 99–71	–	18 – Vick	7 – Preston	6 – 2 tied	Palasport Enrico Somaschini; Milan, Italy
August 6, 2017*; 12:00 pm		vs. Italy All Star A2	W 118–74	–	32 – Newman	9 – K.J. Lawson	10 – Graham	Palasport Enrico Somaschini (500); Milan, Italy
Exhibition
October 22, 2017*; 3:00 pm, PPV		vs. Missouri; Showdown for Relief; Border War	W 93–87	–	25 – Graham	10 – Graham	5 – 2 tied	Sprint Center (18,951); Kansas City, MO
October 31, 2017*; 7:00 pm, Jayhawk TV		Pittsburg State	W 100–54	–	19 – Newman	14 – Azubuike	5 – Graham	Allen Fieldhouse (16,300); Lawrence, KS
November 7, 2017*; 7:00 pm, Jayhawk TV	No. 4	Fort Hays State	W 86–57	–	27 – Graham	9 – Azubuike	8 – Graham	Allen Fieldhouse (16,300); Lawrence, KS
Regular season
November 10, 2017*; 8:00 pm, ESPNU	No. 4	Tennessee State	W 92–56	1–0	23 – Vick	10 – Garrett	12 – Graham	Allen Fieldhouse (16,300); Lawrence, KS
November 14, 2017*; 8:30 pm, ESPN	No. 4	vs. No. 7 Kentucky; Champions Classic	W 65–61	2–0	17 – Mykhailiuk	8 – Azubuike	5 – 2 tied	United Center (21,684); Chicago, IL
November 17, 2017*; 7:00 pm, Jayhawk TV	No. 4	South Dakota State	W 98–64	3–0	27 – Mykhailiuk	7 – 2 tied	11 – Graham	Allen Fieldhouse (16,300); Lawrence, KS
November 21, 2017*; 7:00 pm, Jayhawk TV	No. 3	Texas Southern; Hoophall Miami Invitational campus game	W 114–71	4–0	21 – Mykhailiuk	11 – Garrett	11 – Graham	Allen Fieldhouse (16,300); Lawrence, KS
November 24, 2017*; 7:00 pm, Jayhawk TV	No. 3	Oakland; Hoophall Miami Invitational campus game	W 102–59	5–0	21 – Azubuike	10 – Azubuike	7 – Graham	Allen Fieldhouse (16,300); Lawrence, KS
November 28, 2017*; 7:00 pm, Jayhawk TV	No. 2	Toledo; Hoophall Miami Invitational campus game	W 96–58	6–0	35 – Graham	7 – Garrett	5 – Graham	Allen Fieldhouse (16,300); Lawrence, KS
December 2, 2017*; 4:30 pm, ESPN	No. 2	vs. Syracuse; Hoophall Miami Invitational	W 76–60	7–0	35 – Graham	9 – Azubuike	7 – Vick	American Airlines Arena (8,426); Miami, FL
December 6, 2017*; 8:00 pm, ESPN2	No. 2	Washington; Jayhawk Shootout	L 65–74	7–1	28 – Vick	9 – Azubuike	7 – Vick	Sprint Center (17,106); Kansas City, MO
December 10, 2017*; 1:00 pm, ESPN	No. 2	No. 16 Arizona State	L 85–95	7–2	25 – Vick	9 – Azubuike	8 – Graham	Allen Fieldhouse (16,300); Lawrence, KS
December 16, 2017*; 7:00 pm, FS1	No. 13	at Nebraska; Shelter Insurance Showcase	W 73–72	8–2	26 – Azubuike	10 – Azubuike	8 – Graham	Pinnacle Bank Arena (15,596); Lincoln, NE
December 18, 2017*; 6:00 pm, ESPN2	No. 14	Omaha	W 109–64	9–2	26 – Mykhailiuk	12 – Azubuike	8 – Graham	Allen Fieldhouse (16,300); Lawrence, KS
December 21, 2017*; 10:00 pm, ESPN2	No. 14	vs. Stanford; Sacramento Showcase	W 75–54	10–2	22 – Azubuike	7 – 3 tied	6 – Graham	Golden 1 Center (7,880); Sacramento, CA
December 29, 2017; 8:00 pm, ESPN2	No. 11	at Texas	W 92–86	11–2 (1–0)	23 – Graham	13 – Azubuike	8 – Graham	Frank Erwin Center (15,802); Austin, TX
January 2, 2018; 8:00 pm, ESPN	No. 10	No. 18 Texas Tech	L 73–85	11–3 (1–1)	27 – Graham	7 – Azubuike	6 – Graham	Allen Fieldhouse (16,300); Lawrence, KS
January 6, 2018; 8:15 pm, ESPN2	No. 10	at No. 16 TCU	W 88–84	12–3 (2–1)	28 – Graham	7 – Lightfott	6 – 2 tied	Schollmaier Arena (6,800); Fort Worth, TX
January 9, 2018; 8:00 pm, ESPN2	No. 12	Iowa State	W 83–78	13–3 (3–1)	27 – Newman	8 – Newman	9 – Graham	Allen Fieldhouse (16,300); Lawrence, KS
January 13, 2018; 11:00 am, ESPN	No. 12	Kansas State; Sunflower Showdown	W 73–72	14–3 (4–1)	23 – Graham	8 – Azubuike	5 – Graham	Allen Fieldhouse (16,300); Lawrence, KS
January 15, 2018; 8:00 pm, ESPN	No. 10	at No. 6 West Virginia	W 71–66	15–3 (5–1)	17 – Mykhailiuk	9 – Azubuike	6 – Graham	WVU Coliseum (14,115); Morgantown, WV
January 20, 2018; 5:00 pm, ESPN	No. 10	Baylor	W 70–67	16–3 (6–1)	24 – Newman	8 – Graham	7 – Graham	Allen Fieldhouse (16,300); Lawrence, KS
January 23, 2018; 6:00 pm, ESPN2	No. 5	at No. 12 Oklahoma	L 80–85	16–4 (6–2)	24 – Mykhailiuk	7 – Graham	9 – Graham	Lloyd Noble Center (11,886); Norman, OK
January 27, 2018*; 3:30 pm, ESPN	No. 5	Texas A&M; Big 12/SEC Challenge	W 79–68	17–4	24 – Mykhailiuk	7 – Newman	7 – Graham	Allen Fieldhouse (16,300); Lawrence, KS
January 29, 2018; 8:00 pm, ESPN	No. 7	at Kansas State; Sunflower Showdown	W 70–56	18–4 (7–2)	22 – Mykhailiuk	10 – Newman	11 – Graham	Bramlage Coliseum (12,528); Manhattan, KS
February 3, 2018; 11:00 am, CBS	No. 7	Oklahoma State	L 79–84	18–5 (7–3)	20 – Azubuike	5 – 2 tied	8 – Graham	Allen Fieldhouse (16,300); Lawrence, KS
February 6, 2018; 8:00 pm, ESPN2	No. 10	TCU	W 71–64	19–5 (8–3)	24 – Graham	11 – Azubuike	5 – 2 tied	Allen Fieldhouse (16,300); Lawrence, KS
February 10, 2018; 1:00 pm, CBS	No. 10	at Baylor	L 64–80	19–6 (8–4)	23 – Graham	4 – 3 tied	5 – Newman	Ferrell Center (10,284); Waco, TX
February 13, 2018; 6:00 pm, ESPN2	No. 13	at Iowa State	W 83–77	20–6 (9–4)	19 – Azubuike	6 – 2 tied	5 – Graham	Hilton Coliseum (14,384); Ames, IA
February 17, 2018; 5:00 pm, ESPN	No. 13	No. 20 West Virginia	W 77–69	21–6 (10–4)	21 – Azubuike	8 – Graham	7 – Graham	Allen Fieldhouse (16,300); Lawrence, KS
February 19, 2018; 8:00 pm, ESPN	No. 8	Oklahoma	W 104–74	22–6 (11–4)	23 – Graham	8 – Azubuike	7 – Graham	Allen Fieldhouse (16,300); Lawrence, KS
February 24, 2018; 3:00 pm, ESPN	No. 8	at No. 6 Texas Tech	W 74–72	23–6 (12–4)	26 – Graham	7 – Azubuike	4 – 2 tied	United Supermarkets Arena (15,098); Lubbock, TX
February 26, 2018; 8:00 pm, ESPN	No. 6	Texas	W 80–70	24–6 (13–4)	20 – Azubuike	8 – Azubuike	11 – Graham	Allen Fieldhouse (16,300); Lawrence, KS
March 3, 2018; 3:00 pm, ESPN2	No. 6	at Oklahoma State	L 64–82	24–7 (13–5)	15 – Graham	7 – Azubuike	8 – Graham	Gallagher-Iba Arena (12,482); Stillwater, OK
Big 12 Tournament
March 8, 2018; 2:00 pm, ESPN2	(1) No. 9	vs. (8) Oklahoma State; Quarterfinal	W 82–68	25–7	30 – Newman	6 – 2 tied	9 – Graham	Sprint Center (17,903); Kansas City, MO
March 9, 2018; 6:00 pm, ESPN2	(1) No. 9	vs. (4) Kansas State; Semifinal	W 83–67	26–7	22 – Newman	11 – De Sousa	8 – Graham	Sprint Center (18,223); Kansas City, MO
March 10, 2018; 5:00 pm, ESPN	(1) No. 9	vs. (3) No. 18 West Virginia; Championship	W 81–70	27–7	20 – Newman	10 – De Sousa	13 – Graham	Sprint Center (17,718); Kansas City, MO
NCAA Tournament
March 15, 2018*; 1:00 pm, TBS	(1 MW) No. 4	vs. (16 MW) Penn; First round	W 76–60	28–7	29 – Graham	11 – Lightfoot	6 – Graham	Intrust Bank Arena (14,390); Wichita, KS
March 17, 2018*; 6:10 pm, TBS	(1 MW) No. 4	vs. (8 MW) Seton Hall; Second round	W 83–79	29–7	28 – Newman	7 – Azubuike	9 – Graham	Intrust Bank Arena (14,385); Wichita, KS
March 23, 2018*; 6:07 pm, CBS	(1 MW) No. 4	vs. (5 MW) No. 20 Clemson; Sweet Sixteen	W 80–76	30–7	17 – Newman	11 – Azubuike	4 – 2 tied	CenturyLink Center Omaha (17,399); Omaha, NE
March 25, 2018*; 4:05 pm, CBS	(1 MW) No. 4	vs. (2 MW) No. 9 Duke; Elite Eight	W 85–81 ^{OT}	31–7	32 – Newman	10 – 2 tied	6 – Graham	CenturyLink Center Omaha (17,579); Omaha, NE
March 31, 2018*; 7:49 pm, TBS	(1 MW) No. 4	vs. (1 E) No. 2 Villanova; Final Four	L 79–95	31–8	23 – Graham	8 – Newman	3 – 2 tied	Alamodome (68,257); San Antonio, TX
*Non-conference game. ^{#}Rankings from AP Poll. (#) Tournament seedings in parentheses. MW=Midwest E=East. All times are in Central Time.

== Rankings ==
Ranking movements Legend: ██ Increase in ranking ██ Decrease in ranking ( ) = First-place votes
	Week																			
Poll	Pre	1	2	3	4	5	6	7	8	9	10	11	12	13	14	15	16	17	18	Final
AP	4 (1)	4 (2)	3	2	2	13	14	11	10	12	10	5	7	10	13	8	6	9	4	Not released
Coaches	3	3	2	2 (1)	2 (1)	12	13	11	10	12	10	5	7	10	13	8	6	9	3	3

*AP does not release post-NCAA tournament rankings.

== Post-season awards ==
Bill Self

- Big 12 Co-Coach of the Year

Devonte Graham

- Big 12 Player of the Year
- 1st Team All-Big 12
- Consensus 1st Team All-American
- NCAA Tournament All-Midwest Regional team

Malik Newman

- Big 12 Newcomer of the Year
- Big 12 All-Newcomer Team
- Big 12 Tournament Most Outstanding Player
- NCAA Tournament Midwest Regional Most Outstanding Player
- NCAA Tournament All-Midwest Regional team

Sviatoslav Mykhailiuk

- 2nd Team All-Big 12

Udoka Azubuike

- 3rd Team All-Big 12

LaGerald Vick

- Honorable Mention All-Big 12

Clay Young

- Academic All-Big 12

Primary source unless otherwise noted:
