= 2024 FIBA Men's Pre-Qualifying Olympic Qualifying Tournaments – Asia =

2024 FIBA Men's Pre-Qualifying Olympic Qualifying Tournaments
Tournament details
- Host country: Syria
- City: Damascus
- Dates: 12–17 August 2023
- Teams: 6 (from 1 confederation)
- Venue(s): 1 (in 1 host city)

Final positions
- Champions: Bahrain

Tournament statistics
- Top scorer: (Indonesia) Marques Bolden (23.4 ppg)
- Top rebounds: (Saudi Arabia) Mohammed Al-Suwailem (13.2 rpg)
- Top assists: (Saudi Arabia) Khalid Abdel Gabar (7.2 apg)

Official website
- OPQT Syria

The 2024 FIBA Men's Pre-Qualifying Olympic Qualifying Tournaments in Asia was one of five 2024 FIBA Men's Pre-Qualifying Olympic Qualifying Tournaments. The tournament was held from 12 to 17 August 2023 in Damascus, Syria. Bahrain, as the winner, qualified for the 2024 FIBA Men's Olympic Qualifying Tournaments.

== Teams ==
Teams that missed out on the 2023 FIBA Basketball World Cup participated.

Qualification method		Places	Qualified team
2023 FIBA World Cup Qualifiers – Asia	5th	2	Saudi Arabia
2023 FIBA World Cup Qualifiers – Asia	5th	2	Kazakhstan
2023 FIBA World Cup Qualifiers – Asia	6th	2	India
2023 FIBA World Cup Qualifiers – Asia	6th	2	Bahrain
2023 FIBA World Cup Qualifiers – Asia	4th (round 1)	4	~~South Korea~~
2023 FIBA World Cup Qualifiers – Asia	4th (round 1)	4	~~Chinese Taipei~~
2023 FIBA World Cup Qualifiers – Asia	4th (round 1)	4	Indonesia
2023 FIBA World Cup Qualifiers – Asia	4th (round 1)	4	Syria
Total		8	

South Korea and Chinese Taipei withdrew before the tournament.

== Draw ==
The draw took place on 1 May 2023.

=== Seeding ===
The seedings were announced on 29 April 2023.

Pot 1	Pot 2	Pot 3	Pot 4
~~South Korea~~; Kazakhstan	Saudi Arabia; ~~Chinese Taipei~~	Syria; India	Bahrain; Indonesia

== Standings ==
After South Korea and Chinese Taipei withdrew, a single round-robin was played.

Pos	Team	Pld	W	L	PF	PA	PD	Pts	Qualification
1	Bahrain	5	5	0	458	339	+119	10	Olympic Qualifying Tournaments
2	Saudi Arabia	5	3	2	402	375	+27	8	
3	India	5	2	3	386	392	−6	7 (Note: Head-to-head points difference: India +13, Kazakhstan −6, Indonesia −7.)	
4	Kazakhstan	5	2	3	373	414	−41	7	
5	Indonesia	5	2	3	393	431	−38	7	
6	Syria (H)	5	1	4	355	416	−61	6	

Source: FIBA
Rules for classification: 1) points; 2) head-to-head points; 3) head-to-head points difference; 4) head-to-head number of points scored.
(H) Hosts

== Games ==
All times are local (UTC+3).

12 August 2023
15:00

Boxscore

Indonesia	91–82	Kazakhstan
Scoring by quarter: 19–22, 28–16, 23–21, 21–23
Pts: Bolden 40; Rebs: Bolden 10; Asts: Saputera 8		Pts: Bykov 21; Rebs: Pan 12; Asts: Kuanov 6

Al-Fayhaa Sports Arena, Damascus
Attendance: 200
Referees: Mohammad Doost (IRN), Issam Al-Siyabi (OMN), Mohammed Al-Tarawneh (JOR)

12 August 2023
17:30

Boxscore

Bahrain	89–74	Saudi Arabia
Scoring by quarter: 22–17, 19–21, 28–18, 20–18
Pts: Chism 24; Rebs: Hamooda 6 Asts: Melad 6		Pts: Al-Suwailem 23; Rebs: Al-Suwailem 19; Asts: Abdel Gabar 6

Al-Fayhaa Sports Arena, Damascus
Referees: Rabah Noujaim (LBN), Mohammad Taha (JOR), Taha Al-Hashedi (YEM)

12 August 2023
20:00

Boxscore

Syria	74–85	India
Scoring by quarter: 16–31, 19–17, 18–23, 21–14
Pts: Issa 21; Rebs: Al-Hamwi 7 Asts: Harbasha 6		Pts: Prince 21; Rebs: Pa. Singh, A. Singh 6 Asts: Prince 7

Al-Fayhaa Sports Arena, Damascus
Attendance: 3,500
Referees: Mohammad Al-Amiri (KWT), Hadi Salem (IRN), Ahmad Al-Yousef (JOR)

13 August 2023
15:00

Boxscore

Kazakhstan	67–104	Bahrain
Scoring by quarter: 18–25, 12–21, 17–26, 20–32
Pts: Neff 19; Rebs: Pan 10; Asts: Balashov 6		Pts: M. Rashed 26; Rebs: Chism 9 Asts: three players 4

Al-Fayhaa Sports Arena, Damascus
Referees: Mohammad Doost (IRN), Mohammad Taha (JOR), Hadi Salem (IRN)

13 August 2023
17:30

Boxscore

India	90–74	Indonesia
Scoring by quarter: 25–16, 25–20, 19–19, 21–19
Pts: Hafeez 15; Rebs: Pa. Singh 9 Asts: Bhriguvanshi, Hafeez 5		Pts: Bolden 23; Rebs: Bolden 9 Asts: Saputera 4

Al-Fayhaa Sports Arena, Damascus
Attendance: 100
Referees: Mohammad Doost (IRN), Mohammed Al-Hashedi (YEM), hmad Al-Yousef (JOR)

13 August 2023
20:00

Boxscore

Saudi Arabia	71–73	Syria
Scoring by quarter: 20–20, 19–13, 17–18, 15–22
Pts: Al-Suwailem 19; Rebs: Al-Suwailem 11; Asts: Abdel Gabar 5		Pts: Issa 23; Rebs: Idelbi 12; Asts: Peterson 5

Al-Fayhaa Sports Arena, Damascus
Attendance: 4,000
Referees: Rabah Noujaim (LBN), Mohammed Al-Tarawneh (JOR), Issam Al-Siyabi (OMN)

14 August 2023
15:00

Boxscore

India	70–73	Kazakhstan
Scoring by quarter: 16–19, 20–18, 18–13, 16–23
Pts: Krishnan 18; Rebs: Pa. Singh 10; Asts: Hafeez, Prince 4		Pts: Ivanov 19; Rebs: Ivanov 12; Asts: Balashov 6

Al-Fayhaa Sports Arena, Damascus
Attendance: 10
Referees: Rabah Noujaim (LBN), Hadi Salem (IRN), Ahmad Al-Yousef (JOR)

14 August 2023
17:30

Boxscore

Indonesia	72–86	Saudi Arabia
Scoring by quarter: 23–20, 15–23, 19–24, 15–19
Pts: Bolden 21; Rebs: Bolden 9 Asts: Saputera 9		Pts: Al-Suwailem 23; Rebs: Al-Suwailem 17; Asts: Abdel Gabar 7

Al-Fayhaa Sports Arena, Damascus
Referees: Mohammad Al-Amiri (KWT), Mohammad Doost (IRN), Issam Al-Siyabi (OMN)

14 August 2023
20:00

Boxscore

Syria	60–91	Bahrain
Scoring by quarter: 13–19, 14–25, 17–21, 16–26
Pts: Harbasha 15; Rebs: Canbolat 8 Asts: Issa 7		Pts: M. Rashed 32; Rebs: Chism 9 Asts: Isa 7

Al-Fayhaa Sports Arena, Damascus
Attendance: 4,500
Referees: Paul Skayem (LBN), Mohammad Taha (JOR), Taha Al-Hashedi (YEM)

16 August 2023
15:00

Boxscore

Saudi Arabia	92–75	India
Scoring by quarter: 27–14, 25–16, 18–20, 22–25
Pts: Gabar, Kadi 15; Rebs: Al-Suwailem, Kadi 9 Asts: Gabar 9		Pts: Sandhu 14; Rebs: Sandhu 9 Asts: Bhriguvanshi 7

Al-Fayhaa Sports Arena, Damascus
Referees: Paul Skayem (LBN), Taha Al-Hashedi (YEM), Ahmad Al-Yousef (JOR)

16 August 2023
17:30

Boxscore

Bahrain	95–72	Indonesia
Scoring by quarter: 23–16, 22–15, 27–17, 23–24
Pts: Chism 20; Rebs: Chism 11; Asts: three players 3		Pts: Putra Teja 15; Rebs: Reza Guntara, Bolden 7 Asts: Xavi Yonga 4

Al-Fayhaa Sports Arena, Damascus
Attendance: 100
Referees: Mohammad Taha (JOR), Hadi Salem (IRN), Mohammed Al-Tarawneh (JOR)

16 August 2023
20:00

Boxscore

Kazakhstan	85–70	Syria
Scoring by quarter: 18–17, 21–14, 29–14, 17–25
Pts: Pan 30; Rebs: Pan 12; Asts: Marat, Neff 12		Pts: Harbasha 20; Rebs: Peterson 9 Asts: Harbasha 5

Al-Fayhaa Sports Arena, Damascus
Attendance: 1,800
Referees: Mohammad Al-Amiri (KWT), Mohammad Doost (IRN), Issam Al-Siyabi (OMN)

17 August 2023
15:00

Boxscore

India	66–79	Bahrain
Scoring by quarter: 24–17, 15–31, 12–22, 15–9
Pts: Sekhon 17; Rebs: Prince, Singh 10; Asts: Sekhon 4		Pts: Hamooda 24; Rebs: Chism 11; Asts: Melad 6

Al-Fayhaa Sports Arena, Damascus
Attendance: 50
Referees: Mohammad Al-Amiri (KWT), Issam Al-Siyabi (OMN), Taha Al-Hashedi (YEM)

17 August 2023
17:30

Boxscore

Saudi Arabia	79–66	Kazakhstan
Scoring by quarter: 24–10, 24–13, 22–26, 9–17
Pts: Al-Suwailem 23; Rebs: Al-Suwailem 10; Asts: Abdel Gabar 9		Pts: Pan 14; Rebs: Ivanov 4 Asts: Kuanov 8

Al-Fayhaa Sports Arena, Damascus
Attendance: 100
Referees: Mohammad Doost (IRN), Mohammad Taha (JOR), Mohammed Al-Tarawneh (JOR)

17 August 2023
20:00

Boxscore

Indonesia	84–78	Syria
Scoring by quarter: 19–23, 26–22, 32–16, 7–17
Pts: Bolden 24; Rebs: Bolden 11; Asts: Saputera 8		Pts: Issa 23; Rebs: Adribe 11; Asts: Issa 8

Al-Fayhaa Sports Arena, Damascus
Attendance: 1,500
Referees: Paul Skayem (LBN), Ahmad Al-Yousef (JOR), Hadi Salem (IRN)
