= Thomas Johnson (defensive tackle) =

American football player (born 1981)

No. 92, 96, 93
- Position: Defensive tackle

Personal information
- Born: June 24, 1981 (age 45); Memphis, Tennessee, U.S.
- Listed height: 6 ft 2 in (1.88 m)
- Listed weight: 305 lb (138 kg)

Career information
- High school: Hamilton (Memphis)
- College: Middle Tennessee State
- NFL draft: 2005: undrafted

Career history
- Dallas Cowboys (2005); Houston Texans (2006); New York Jets (2008)*; Atlanta Falcons (2009-2010)
- * Offseason or practice squad member only

Career NFL statistics
- Games played: 26
- Stats at Pro Football Reference

Thomas Johnson (born June 24, 1981) is an American former professional football player who was a defensive tackle in the National Football League (NFL) for the Dallas Cowboys, Houston Texans and Atlanta Falcons. He played college football for the Middle Tennessee Blue Raiders.

== Early life ==
Johnson attended Hamilton High School, where he played defensive tackle, tight end and linebacker. He led his team in tackles and sacks in his last 2 seasons. As a senior, he received All-state, All-Metro, and All-City honors.

He accepted a football scholarship from Middle Tennessee State University. As a true freshman, although he was enrolled in school, he did not participate in football while improving his grades. As a redshirt freshman, he appeared in 10 games with 4 starts at defensive tackle, registering 19 total tackles (2 for loss) and one sack

As a sophomore, he appeared in 10 games with 4 starts at defensive tackle, tallying 14 tackles, one sack and one blocked punt. As a junior, he appeared in 11 games with 8 starts at defensive tackle, posting 33 tackles (5.5 for loss), 4 sacks and one fumble recovery. As a senior, he was the regular starter at defensive tackle, recording 47 tackles (8 for loss) and 4 sacks.

== Professional career ==
=== Dallas Cowboys ===
Johnson was signed as an undrafted free agent by the Dallas Cowboys after the 2005 NFL draft on April 28, to play as a nose tackle. He was declared inactive in the first 13 games, playing in only 2 games, while making 3 tackles and one quarterback pressure. On September 4, 2006, he was waived during final cuts after the team claimed defensive tackle J'Vonne Parker.

=== Houston Texans ===
On September 6, 2006, he was signed as a free agent by the Houston Texans. He played in 11 games (3 starts) at defensive tackle and defensive end, recording 15 tackles and one pass deflection during the season. He had 5 tackles (4 solo) against the Cleveland Browns. He was released during mandatory roster cuts on August 28, 2007.

=== New York Jets ===
On January 15, 2008, Johnson was signed by the New York Jets to a future contract. He was waived during final cuts on August 30.

=== Atlanta Falcons ===
On January 7, 2009, Johnson was signed by the Atlanta Falcons to a future contract. He started in 10 games after Peria Jerry was lost for the season with a knee injury. He made 20 tackles and forced one fumble. He was waived during final roster cuts on August 31, 2010.
