= K. J. Lawson =

American basketball player (born 1996)

Free agent
- Position: Shooting guard / small forward

Personal information
- Born: May 7, 1996 (age 30) Memphis, Tennessee, U.S.
- Listed height: 6 ft 7 in (2.01 m)
- Listed weight: 209 lb (95 kg)

Career information
- High school: Hamilton (Memphis, Tennessee)
- College: Memphis (2015–2017); Kansas (2018–2019); Tulane (2019–2020)
- NBA draft: 2020: undrafted
- Playing career: 2020–present

Career history
- 2020–2021: Worcester Wolves

Career highlights
- AAC Freshman of the Year (2017); AAC All-Freshman Team (2017)

Keelon Lawson III (born May 7, 1996) is an American professional basketball player who last played for the Worcester Wolves of the British Basketball League. He played college basketball for the Memphis Tigers, the Kansas Jayhawks, and the Tulane Green Wave.

== High school career ==
Lawson attended Hamilton High School in Memphis, Tennessee. He averaged 21.4 points and 12.6 rebounds per game as a junior, earning TSWA Class AAA All-State Team honors. As a senior, he averaged 22.3 points per game and led the Wildcats to the 2015 TSSAA Class AAA state title. Lawson committed to play college basketball at Memphis on October 7, 2013.

== College career ==
Lawson played in 10 games as a true freshman, averaging 8.8 points and 3.5 rebounds per game, before sustaining an Achilles injury and taking a medical redshirt. As a redshirt freshman, Lawson averaged 12.3 points and 8.1 rebounds per game, earning AAC Freshman of the Year honors. He transferred to Kansas in April 2017. In the first round of the 2019 NCAA Tournament, Lawson scored 13 points in a 87–53 win against Northeastern. Lawson averaged 3.1 points and 2.0 rebounds per game as a redshirt sophomore. Following the season, he transferred again to Tulane. On December 1, 2019, Lawson scored a career-high 30 points in an 82–65 win against Southern. As a redshirt junior, Lawson averaged 13.1 points and 5.5 rebounds per game. Though he had an additional year of eligibility, he opted to turn professional.

== Professional career ==
On September 4, 2020, Lawson signed his first professional contract with the Worcester Wolves of the British Basketball League.

He joined the Boston Celtics roster for the 2021 NBA Summer League.

== Personal life ==
Lawson's younger brother, Dedric, plays basketball professionally and was his college teammate at Memphis and Kansas. Another younger brother, Chandler, played for Oregon before transferring to Memphis. Lawson's youngest brother, Johnathan, was a highly ranked high school recruit in the 2021 class before committing to Memphis. K.J. Lawson married his wife Sydney in July 2019, having met at Kansas. He is a vegan.
