= American Conference Men's Basketball Rookie of the Year =

- Awarded for: the most outstanding rookie basketball player in the American Conference
- Country: United States
- First award: 2014
- Currently held by: PJ Haggerty, Tulsa

The American Conference Men's Basketball Rookie of the Year is a basketball award given to the American Conference's one or more best men's basketball players in their first year of competitive play. The conference formed in 2013–14 after many schools departed from the original Big East Conference to form their own conference. The conference was called the American Athletic Conference from its inception up until July 21, 2025, at which time it was formally rebranded. Austin Nichols of Memphis was the first-ever winner. This award is voted for by the coaches and can only be awarded once to any player.

== Key ==
†	Co-Players of the Year
*	Awarded a national Player of the Year award: Naismith College Player of the Year (1968–69 to present) or the John R. Wooden Award (1976–77 to present)

== Winners ==
Season	Player	School	Position	Class	Ref.
2013–14	Austin Nichols	Memphis	Forward	Freshman	
2014–15	Daniel Hamilton	UConn	Swingman	Freshman	
2015–16	Dedric Lawson	Memphis	Forward	Freshman	
2016–17	K. J. Lawson	Memphis	Swingman	RS Freshman	
2017–18	Shawn Williams	East Carolina	Guard	RS Freshman	
2018–19	Alexis Yetna	South Florida	Forward	RS Freshman	
2019–20	Precious Achiuwa	Memphis	Forward	Freshman	
2020–21	Moussa Cissé	Memphis	Center	Freshman	
2021–22	Jalen Duren	Memphis	Center	Freshman	
2022–23	Jarace Walker	Houston	Forward	Freshman	
2023–24	PJ Haggerty	Tulsa	Guard	RS Freshman	

== Winners by school ==
School (year joined)	Winners	Years
Memphis (2013)	6	2014, 2016, 2017, 2020, 2021, 2022
East Carolina (2014)	1	2018
Houston (2013) (Note: Cincinnati, Houston, and UCF left The American after the 2022–23 season to join the current Big 12 Conference.)	1	2023
South Florida (2013)	1	2019
Tulsa (2014)	1	2024
UConn (2013) (Note: UConn left The American after the 2019–20 season to join the current Big East Conference.)	1	2015
Cincinnati (2013)	0	—
Louisville (2013) (Note: Louisville and Rutgers played only the 2013–14 season in The American. In July 2014, they respectively left for the ACC and Big Ten.)	0	—
Rutgers (2013)	0	—
SMU (2013)	0	—
Temple (2013)	0	—
Tulane (2014)	0	—
UCF (2013)	0	—
Wichita State (2017)	0	—
