= Alexis Yetna =

French basketball player (born 1997)

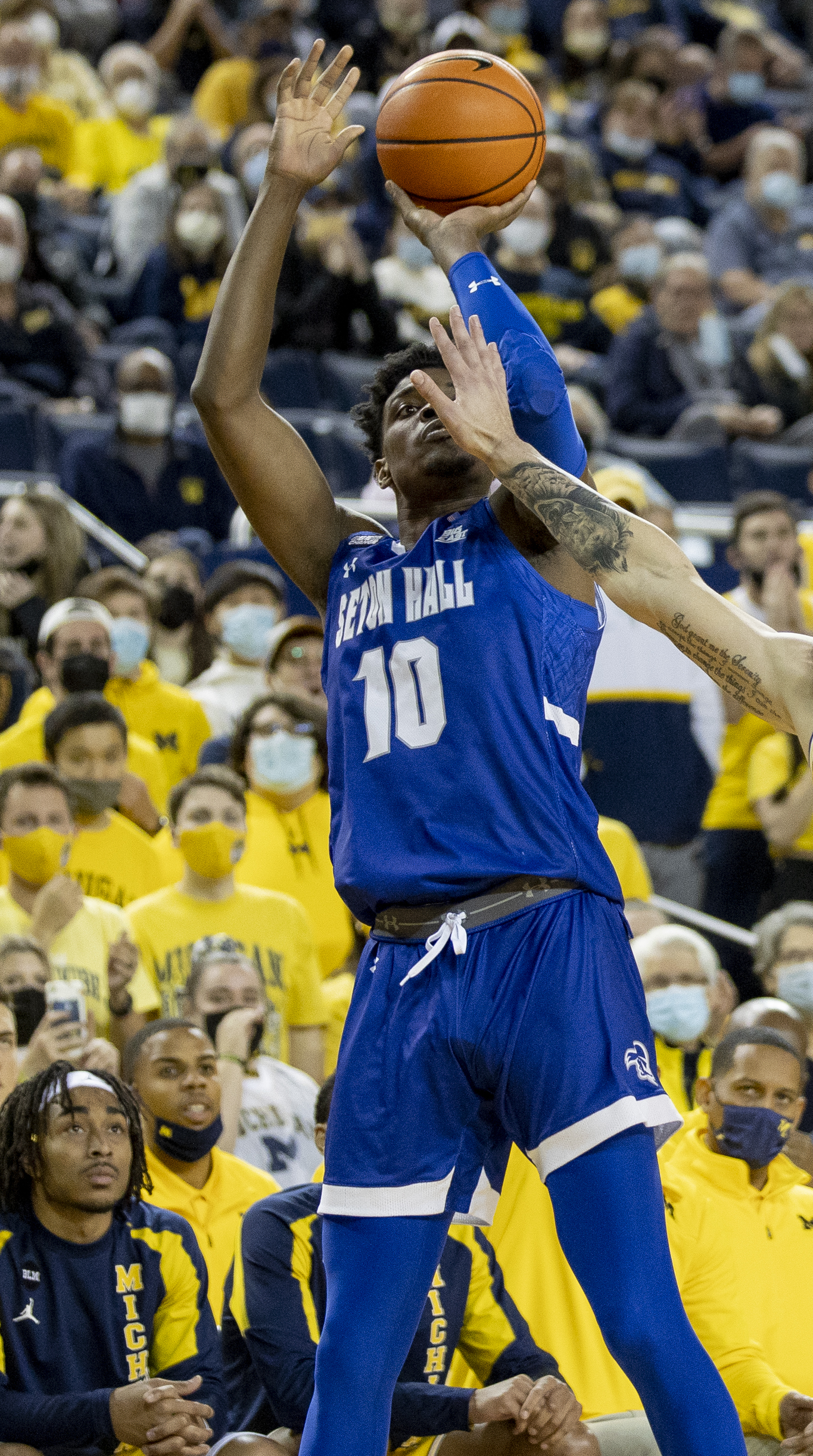
- Yetna in 2021

Personal information
- Born: 7 August 1997 (age 29) Saint-Quentin, France
- Listed height: 6 ft 8 in (2.03 m)
- Listed weight: 225 lb (102 kg)

Career information
- High school: Mt. Zion Prep (Baltimore, Maryland); Putnam Science Academy (Putnam, Connecticut)
- College: South Florida (2018–2021); Seton Hall (2021–2022); Fairfield (2023–2024)
- NBA draft: 2024: undrafted
- Playing career: 2024–present
- Position: Power forward

Career highlights
- CBI champion (2019); AAC Freshman of the Year (2019); AAC All-Freshman Team (2019)
Medals
Men's basketball
Representing France
FIBA U20 European Championship
Bronze medal – third place	2017 Greece	Team

Alexis Yetna (born 7 August 1997) is a French professional basketball player. He played college basketball in the United States of America for the South Florida Bulls, Seton Hall Pirates and the Fairfield Stags.

== Early life and career ==
Yetna grew up in Vauréal, France and played association football for eight years. In 2012, he started playing basketball for Vauréal Basket Club, one year before joining Cergy-Pontoise Basketball. Yetna moved to the United States with the help of coach Xavier Calvaire to compete for Mt. Zion Preparatory School in Baltimore, Maryland. After one year, he transferred to Putnam Science Academy in Putnam, Connecticut, where he played alongside future NBA player Hamidou Diallo. On 19 April 2017, he committed to play college basketball for South Florida over offers from Old Dominion, Oregon State and St. John's, among others. He had been discovered by South Florida's assistant coach Tom Herrion.

== College career ==
Yetna was ruled ineligible for his first season at South Florida by the National Collegiate Athletic Association because he had played prep basketball two years after graduating from high school in France. On 15 December 2018, Yetna recorded 13 points and a freshman season-high 18 rebounds in a 76–69 win over Appalachian State. On 26 January 2019, he posted a season-high 28 points and 13 rebounds in a 77–57 victory over East Carolina. Yetna sustained a hamstring injury against Memphis in February 2019. Yetna was a four-time American Athletic Conference (AAC) Freshman of the Week and was named AAC Freshman of the Year. As a freshman, he averaged 12.3 points and 9.6 rebounds per game, leading the AAC in rebounding and double-doubles (15). He grabbed 346 rebounds, the most by a freshman in school and AAC history. Yetna missed his entire next season after suffering a left knee injury in practice. He underwent surgery for the injury. As a junior, he averaged 9.5 points and 7.3 rebounds per game, missing six games with an ankle injury. After the season, Yetna transferred to Seton Hall, choosing the Pirates over UConn.

== Professional career ==
After going undrafted in the 2024 NBA draft, in June 2024, Yetna signed with Álftanes of the Icelandic Úrvalsdeild karla. He left the club in end of September the same year, before the start of the regular season.

== National team career ==
Yetna played for France at the 2017 FIBA U20 European Championship in Greece. He averaged three points and 3.6 rebounds per game, helping his team win the bronze medal.

== Career statistics ==
Legend
GP	Games played	GS	Games started	MPG	Minutes per game
FG%	Field goal percentage	3P%	3-point field goal percentage	FT%	Free throw percentage
RPG	Rebounds per game	APG	Assists per game	SPG	Steals per game
BPG	Blocks per game	PPG	Points per game	**Bold**	Career high

=== College ===
Year	Team	GP	GS	MPG	FG%	3P%	FT%	RPG	APG	SPG	BPG	PPG
2017–18	South Florida	Redshirt										
2018–19	South Florida	**36**	**34**	**30.2**	**.539**	**.368**	.625	**9.6**	**1.0**	**.8**	**.6**	**12.3**
2019–20	South Florida	Injured										
2020–21	South Florida	16	15	27.3	.463	.315	.719	7.3	.8	.4	**.6**	9.5
2021–22	Seton Hall	31	17	23.9	.404	.228	**.750**	7.6	.8	.6	.3	8.1
Career		83	66	27.3	.479	.301	.676	8.4	.9	.7	.5	10.2

== Personal life ==
Yetna is the son of Gisele Abossolo and Jean Didier Yetna. He is of Cameroonian descent.
