= Marques Bolden =

American-Indonesian basketball player (born 1998)

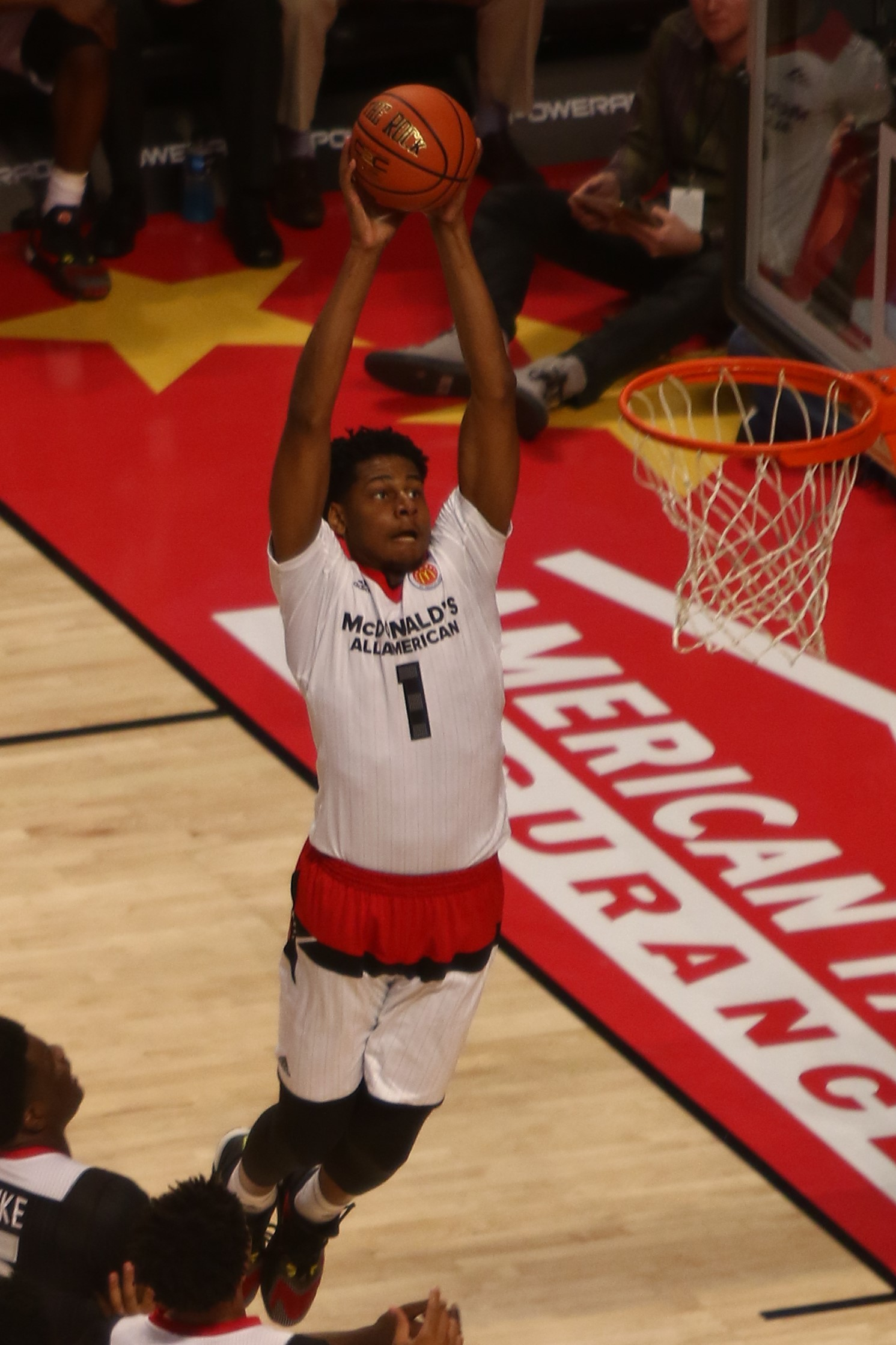
- Bolden in the 2016 McDonald's All-American Game

No. 7 – Levanga Hokkaido
- Position: Center
- League: B.League

Personal information
- Born: April 17, 1998 (age 28) Dallas, Texas, U.S.
- Listed height: 6 ft 10 in (2.08 m)
- Listed weight: 249 lb (113 kg)

Career information
- High school: DeSoto (DeSoto, Texas)
- College: Duke (2016–2019)
- NBA draft: 2019: undrafted
- Playing career: 2019–present

Career history
- 2019–2020: Canton Charge
- 2020–2021: Cleveland Cavaliers
- 2021: →Canton Charge
- 2021–2023: Salt Lake City Stars
- 2023–2024: Milwaukee Bucks
- 2023–2024: →Wisconsin Herd
- 2024: Wisconsin Herd
- 2024: Charlotte Hornets
- 2024: →Greensboro Swarm
- 2025–2026: Santa Cruz Warriors
- 2026: Ironi Ness Ziona
- 2026–present: Levanga Hokkaido

Career highlights
- McDonald's All-American (2016); Texas Mr. Basketball (2016)
- Stats at NBA.com
- Stats at Basketball Reference
Medals
Men's basketball
Representing Indonesia
SEA Games
Gold medal – first place	2021 Vietnam	Team

Marques Terrell Bolden (/mɑːrˈkwiːs/ mar-KWEESS; born April 17, 1998) is an American-born naturalized Indonesian professional basketball player for Levanga Hokkaido of the B.League. He played college basketball for the Duke Blue Devils.

== High school career ==
At DeSoto High School, Bolden supplied per-game averages of 23.4 points, 10.2 rebounds and 2.6 blocked shots as a senior, helping his team win the Texas Class 6A state title, while earning Texas Mr. Basketball and TABC 6A Player of the Year honors. He had eight points and five rebounds in the 2016 Jordan Brand Classic and tallied 13 points as well as seven boards at the McDonald's All-American Game the same year.

Bolden was ranked 8th overall in the 2016 high school class by Scout.com, 11th overall by Rivals and 16th overall by ESPN. On May 19, 2016, Bolden committed to Duke, joining fellow five-star recruits Harry Giles III, Jayson Tatum and Frank Jackson.

== College career ==
Bolden had to sit out the first eight games of the 2016–17 season due to a leg injury, before making his debut against Maine on December 3, 2016, scoring seven points and five rebounds. He missed the NCAA Tournament due to illness and averaged 1.5 points and 1.1 rebounds (24 games) as a freshman.

As a sophomore, Bolden averaged 3.9 points and 3.6 rebounds per game, playing behind Wendell Carter Jr. and Marvin Bagley III. On June 25, 2018, coach Mike Krzyzewski said he thought he would be one of the best big men in the upcoming season. As a junior in 2018–19, he saw action in 35 games (21 starts) with the Blue Devils, averaging 5.3 points, 4.5 rebounds and 1.7 blocks in 19.1 minutes per game. In April 2019, Bolden announced his participation in the 2019 NBA draft.

== Professional career ==
=== Cleveland Cavaliers / Canton / Cleveland Charge (2019–2021) ===
After going undrafted in the 2019 NBA draft, Bolden joined the Cleveland Cavaliers in the 2019 NBA Summer League. On October 19, 2019, the Cavaliers released Bolden, later to add him to the roster of their NBA G League affiliate, the Canton Charge.

On January 30, 2020, the Cleveland Cavaliers announced that they had signed Bolden to a 10-day contract. Bolden was reported to have returned to the Canton Charge after the contract expired.

On November 30, 2020, the Cleveland Cavaliers announced that they had added Bolden, and the contract was converted to a two-way contract on December 19. On February 24, 2021, the Cavaliers waived Bolden, and two days later on February 26, he was re-acquired by the Charge.

=== Salt Lake City Stars (2021–2023) ===
On September 28, 2021, Bolden signed with the Utah Jazz. He was waived prior to the start of the season and added to the roster of their G League affiliate, the Salt Lake City Stars.

On September 22, 2022, Bolden signed with the Milwaukee Bucks, but was waived on October 16, prior to the start of the regular season. Seven days later, he rejoined the Salt Lake City Stars.

On January 25, 2023, Bolden was placed on the injured list, ending his season with the Stars.

=== Milwaukee Bucks / Wisconsin Herd (2023–2024) ===
On October 2, 2023, Bolden once again signed with the Milwaukee Bucks. and on October 21, his deal was converted into a two-way contract. On January 7, 2024, he was waived by the Bucks and five days later, he joined the Wisconsin Herd.

=== Charlotte Hornets / Greensboro Swarm (2024) ===
On February 20, 2024, Bolden signed a 10-day contract with the Charlotte Hornets and on March 2, he signed a two-way contract. He recorded his first career high at the last 2023–24 NBA season game winning against Cavaliers with 14 points, 8 rebounds, 2 assists, 4 blocks and 1 steal over 30 minutes. On July 3, he was waived by the Hornets.

=== Santa Cruz Warriors (2025–2026) ===
Bolden joined the Golden State Warriors for both the 2024 and 2025 NBA Summer Leagues. For the 2025–26 season, he was added to the training camp roster of the Warriors' G League affiliate, the Santa Cruz Warriors.

== National team career ==
Playing at the 2016 Nike Hoop Summit, Bolden scored three points and pulled down two rebounds in 13 minutes of action for Team USA. He attended a training camp of the 2017 USA Basketball Men's U19 World Cup Team but was cut before the start of the tournament.

In July 2021, Bolden was naturalized into an Indonesian citizen. He helped the national team win its first ever Southeast Asian Games gold medal in 2022. In 2022 FIBA Asia Cup, he brought Indonesia for the qualification to quarter finals and he recorded statistical averages of highest minutes per game (38.0), highest efficiency per game (28.5), highest blocks per game (2.8), second highest points per game (21.8), third highest double-doubles (3), and fourth highest rebounds per game (11.3) among all participating players during the tournament.

== Career statistics ==
Legend
GP	Games played	GS	Games started	MPG	Minutes per game
FG%	Field goal percentage	3P%	3-point field goal percentage	FT%	Free throw percentage
RPG	Rebounds per game	APG	Assists per game	SPG	Steals per game
BPG	Blocks per game	PPG	Points per game	**Bold**	Career high

=== NBA ===
==== Regular season ====
Year	Team	GP	GS	MPG	FG%	3P%	FT%	RPG	APG	SPG	BPG	PPG
2019–20	Cleveland	1	0	2.8	—	—	—	2.0	.0	**1.0**	.0	.0
2020–21	Cleveland	6	0	4.8	.333	—	.625	1.0	.0	.3	.3	1.2
2023–24	Milwaukee	2	0	1.5	—	—	—	1.0	.0	.0	.0	.0
2023–24	Charlotte	**9**	**2**	**13.1**	**.680**	.000	**.750**	**3.6**	**.4**	.3	**.8**	**4.1**
Career		18	2	8.5	.643	.000	.667	2.3	.2	.3	.5	2.4

=== NBA G League ===
==== Regular season ====
Year	Team	GP	GS	MPG	FG%	3P%	FT%	RPG	APG	SPG	BPG	PPG
2019–20	Canton	**38**	**27**	18.9	**.600**	.182	.736	6.7	1.2	0.3	1.5	9.7
2020–21	Canton	10	10	23.9	.507	.000	.867	7.5	1.0	.0	**2.1**	9.2
2021–22	Salt Lake	20	20	**31.7**	.519	.395	.619	**9.3**	1.2	**1.0**	1.9	12.3
2022–23	Salt Lake	3	0	14	.417	.000	.867	5.3	**1.7**	.3	.7	4
2023–24	Wisconsin	18	14	25.3	.561	.310	.773	9.1	1.5	.2	1.7	**13.7**
2023–24	Greenboro	8	7	23.1	.516	**.538**	**1.000**	7.8	1.0	.8	1.5	9.9
Career		97	78	23.4	.550	.345	.730	7.9	1.2	0.4	1.6	12.5

=== College ===
Year	Team	GP	GS	MPG	FG%	3P%	FT%	RPG	APG	SPG	BPG	PPG
2016–17	Duke	24	1	6.5	.457	–	.625	1.1	.1	.1	.3	1.5
2017–18	Duke	29	2	12.9	**.615**	–	.593	3.6	**.6**	.3	1.0	3.9
2018–19	Duke	**35**	**21**	**19.0**	.579	.000	**.726**	**4.5**	.5	**.5**	**1.7**	**5.3**
Career		88	24	19.6	.573	.000	.685	3.3	.4	.3	1.1	3.8

=== National team ===
Year	Team	GP	GS	MPG	FG%	3P%	FT%	RPG	APG	SPG	BPG	PPG
SEA Games 2021
2022	Indonesia	2	1	19.5	.538	.200	**1.000**	6.0	**2.5**	-	1.0	11.0
FIBA Asia Cup 2022
2022	Indonesia	4	4	**38.3**	**.578**	**.438**	.875	**11.3**	0.3	0.5	2.8	21.8
FIBA Pre-Qualifying Olympic 2024
2023	Indonesia	**5**	**5**	31.4	.520	.294	.723	9.2	1.2	**1.0**	**3.0**	**23.4**
