= 2017–18 Kansas State Wildcats men's basketball team =

American college basketball season

2017–18 Kansas State Wildcats men's basketball

NCAA tournament, Elite Eight
- Conference: Big 12 Conference

Ranking
- Coaches: No. 19
- Record: 25–12 (10–8 Big 12)
- Head coach: Bruce Weber (6th season)
- Assistant coaches: Chris Lowery; Chester Frazier; Brad Korn
- Home arena: Bramlage Coliseum (12,528)

2017–18 Big 12 men's basketball standings
	Conf.				Overall
Team	W		L	PCT	W		L	PCT
No. 4 Kansas †	13	–	5	.722	31	–	8	.795
No. 14 Texas Tech	11	–	7	.611	27	–	10	.730
No. 15 West Virginia	11	–	7	.611	26	–	11	.703
Kansas State	10	–	8	.556	25	–	12	.676
TCU	9	–	9	.500	21	–	12	.636
Baylor	8	–	10	.444	19	–	15	.559
Texas	8	–	10	.444	19	–	15	.559
Oklahoma State	8	–	10	.444	21	–	15	.583
Oklahoma	8	–	10	.444	18	–	14	.563
Iowa State	4	–	14	.222	13	–	18	.419
† 2018 Big 12 Tournament winner Rankings from AP poll

The 2017–18 Kansas State Wildcats men's basketball team represented Kansas State University in the 2017–18 NCAA Division I men's basketball season. Their head coach was Bruce Weber in his sixth year at the helm of the Wildcats. The team played its home games in Bramlage Coliseum in Manhattan, Kansas. They were members of the Big 12 Conference. They finished the season 25–12, 10–8 in Big 12 play to finish in fourth place. They defeated TCU in the quarterfinals of the Big 12 tournament before losing to Kansas in the semifinals. They received an at-large bid to the NCAA tournament as the No. 9 seed in the South region. There they defeated Creighton, UMBC, and Kentucky to advance to the Elite Eight. In the Elite Eight, they lost to Loyola–Chicago.

== Previous season ==
The Wildcats finished the 2016–17 season 21–14, 8–10 in Big 12 play to finish in sixth place. They defeated Baylor in the first round of the Big 12 tournament to advance to the quarterfinals where they lost to West Virginia. They received an at-large bid to the NCAA tournament as a No. 11 seed in the South Region. They defeated Wake Forest in the First Four before losing to No. 6-seeded Cincinnati.

== Offseason ==
=== Departures ===
Name	Number	Pos.	Height	Weight	Year	Hometown	Notes
Carlbe Ervin II	1	G	6'3"	202	Senior	Oklahoma City, OK	Graduated
Isaiah Maurice	10	F	6'10"	225	RS Freshman	Durham, NC	Dismissed from the team due to violation of team rules
Zach Winter	13	G	6'3"	208	Senior	Andover, KS	Graduated
Wesley Iwundu	25	F	6'7"	205	Senior	Houston, TX	Graduated/2nd round, 33rd overall 2017 NBA draft
Austin Budke	35	F	6'6"	227	Senior	Beloit, KS	Graduated
D. J. Johnson	4	F	6'9"	237	RS Senior	St. Louis, MO	Graduated

=== Incoming transfers ===
Name	Number	Pos.	Height	Weight	Year	Hometown	Notes
Mawdo Sallah	1	C	6'8"	225	RS Junior	Latri Kunda, Gambia	Transferred from Mount St. Mary's. Will be eligible to play immediately since Sallah graduated from Mount St. Mary's.
Makol Mawien	14	PF	6'9"	215	Sophomore	West Valley City, UT	Junior college transferred from New Mexico Junior College.
Amaad Wainright	23	SG	6'4"	200	Sophomore	Kansas City, MO	Junior college transferred from Trinity Valley Community College.
Patrick Muldoon	35	SF	6'7"	210	Junior	Basehor, Kansas	Transferred from Eastern Illinois. Will sit out 2017–18 season due to NCAA transfer rules and be eligible to play in 2018–19.

=== 2017 recruiting class ===
College recruiting
Name	Hometown	School	Height	Weight	Commit date
Mike McGuirl #80 G	Manchester, CT	East Catholic High School	6 ft 2 in (1.88 m)	175 lb (79 kg)	Sep 11, 2016
Mike McGuirl #80 G	Recruit ratings: Scout: Rivals: 247Sports: ESPN:				
Nigel Shadd; F	Chandler, AZ	Tri-City Christian Academy	6 ft 9 in (2.06 m)	225 lb (102 kg)	Sep 25, 2016
Nigel Shadd; F	Recruit ratings: Scout: Rivals: 247Sports: ESPN:				
Levi Stockard; F	St. Louis, MO	Vashon High School	6 ft 8 in (2.03 m)	250 lb (110 kg)	Oct 3, 2016
Levi Stockard; F	Recruit ratings: Scout: Rivals: 247Sports: ESPN:				
Overall recruit ranking: Scout: Not Ranked Top 20 Rivals: Not Ranked Top 25 ESPN: Not Ranked Top 25
Note: In many cases, Scout, Rivals, 247Sports, On3, and ESPN may conflict in their listings of height and weight.; In these cases, the average was taken. ESPN grades are on a 100-point scale.; Sources: "2017 Kansas State Basketball Commits". Rivals.; "2017 Kansas State Basketball Commits". Scout.; "2017 Kansas State Basketball Commits". ESPN.; "Scout.com Team Recruiting Rankings". Scout.; "2017 Team Ranking". Rivals.

== Roster ==
2017–18 Kansas State Wildcats men's basketball team
Players
Coaches

Pos.	#	Name	Height	Weight	Year	Previous school	Hometown
G	00	Mike McGuirl	6 ft 2 in (1.88 m)	190 lb (86 kg)	Fr	East Catholic High School	Ellington, CT
F	1	Mawdo Sallah	6 ft 9 in (2.06 m)	235 lb (107 kg)	RS Jr	Mount St. Mary's	Latri Kunda, Gambia
G	2	Cartier Diarra	6 ft 4 in (1.93 m)	190 lb (86 kg)	RS Fr	West Florence High School	Florence, SC
G	3	Kamau Stokes	6 ft 0 in (1.83 m)	170 lb (77 kg)	Jr	Fork Union Military Academy	Baltimore, MD
G	5	Barry Brown Jr.	6 ft 3 in (1.91 m)	195 lb (88 kg)	Jr	Gibbs High School	St. Petersburg, FL
G	11	Brian Patrick	6 ft 5 in (1.96 m)	195 lb (88 kg)	RS So	Boyd H. Anderson High School	Fort Lauderdale, FL
G	12	Mason Schoen (W)	6 ft 2 in (1.88 m)	185 lb (84 kg)	RS Sr	Blue Valley Northwest High School	Overland Park, KS
F	14	Makol Mawien	6 ft 9 in (2.06 m)	225 lb (102 kg)	So	New Mexico Junior College	West Valley City, UT
F	20	Xavier Sneed	6 ft 5 in (1.96 m)	212 lb (96 kg)	So	Hazelwood Central High School	Florissant, MO
F	21	James Love III	6 ft 11 in (2.11 m)	225 lb (102 kg)	RS Fr	American Heritage School	Fort Lauderdale, FL
G	23	Amaad Wainright	6 ft 2 in (1.88 m)	200 lb (91 kg)	Jr	Trinity Valley Community College	Kansas City, MO
F	24	Pierson McAtee (W)	6 ft 6 in (1.98 m)	200 lb (91 kg)	RS So	Manhattan High School	Manhattan, KS
F	32	Dean Wade	6 ft 10 in (2.08 m)	228 lb (103 kg)	Jr	St. John-Hudson High School	St. John, KS
F	34	Levi Stockard III	6 ft 8 in (2.03 m)	239 lb (108 kg)	Fr	Vashon High School	St. Louis, MO
F	35	Patrick Muldoon (W) (redshirt)	6 ft 7 in (2.01 m)	210 lb (95 kg)	Jr	Eastern Illinois	Basehor, KS
G	40	Kade Kinnamon (W)	6 ft 0 in (1.83 m)	175 lb (79 kg)	Jr	St. John-Hudson High School	St. John, KS
F	45	Nigel Shadd	6 ft 9 in (2.06 m)	235 lb (107 kg)	Fr	Tri-City Christian Academy	St. Louis, MO

Head coach

- Bruce Weber (Wisconsin–Milwaukee)

Assistant coach(es)

- Chris Lowery (Southern Illinois)
- Chester Frazier (Illinois)
- Brad Korn (Southern Illinois)

Legend

- (C) Team captain
- (S) Suspended
- (I) Ineligible
- (W) Walk-on
- Injured
- Current redshirt

Roster

== Schedule and results ==
Date time, TV	Rank^{#}	Opponent^{#}	Result	Record	High points	High rebounds	High assists	Site (attendance) city, state
Exhibition
Oct 21, 2017*; 12:00 pm		Missouri State; ARC hurricane relief benefit	W 78–62		15 – Diarra	7 – Wade	3 – 2 tied	Bramlage Coliseum; Manhattan, KS
Oct 29, 2017*; 2:00 pm, FSKC		Fort Hays State	W 79–56		18 – Sneed	7 – 2 tied	6 – Diarra	Bramlage Coliseum (10,979); Manhattan, KS
Nov 3, 2017*; 8:00 pm, FSKC		Emporia State	W 77–44		20 – Wade	10 – Wade	4 – 2 tied	Bramlage Coliseum (6,841); Manhattan, KS
Regular season
Nov 10, 2017*; 8:00 pm, FSKC		American	W 83–45	1–0	17 – Wade	9 – Mawien	7 – Stokes	Bramlage Coliseum (8,218); Manhattan, KS
Nov 14, 2017*; 7:00 pm, FSKC		UMKC	W 72–51	2–0	14 – Brown	9 – Sallah	4 – 2 tied	Bramlage Coliseum (7,373); Manhattan, KS
Nov 17, 2017*; 8:00 pm, FSKC		UC Irvine; Las Vegas Invitational	W 71–49	3–0	14 – Stokes	5 – Sneed	4 – Brown	Bramlage Coliseum (6,451); Manhattan, KS
Nov 20, 2017*; 7:00 pm, FSKC		Northern Arizona; Las Vegas Invitational	W 80–58	4–0	20 – Brown	5 – Wade	7 – Sneed	Bramlage Coliseum (6,112); Manhattan, KS
Nov 23, 2017*; 5:30 pm, FS1		vs. Arizona State; Las Vegas Invitational semifinals	L 90–92	4–1	27 – Brown	6 – Wainright	7 – Wade	Orleans Arena (3,425); Paradise, NV
Nov 24, 2017*; 7:00 pm, FS1		vs. George Washington; Las Vegas Invitational 3rd place game	W 67–59	5–1	19 – Stokes	9 – Wade	3 – Brown	Orleans Arena (3,325); Paradise, NV
Nov 29, 2017*; 7:00 pm, FSKC		Oral Roberts	W 77–68	6–1	25 – Wade	11 – Wade	5 – 2 tied	Bramlage Coliseum (7,273); Manhattan, KS
Dec 3, 2017*; 1:30 pm, SECN+		at Vanderbilt	W 84–79	7–1	21 – Sneed	7 – Wade	6 – Stokes	Memorial Gymnasium (8,750); Nashville, TN
Dec 5, 2017*; 7:00 pm, FSKC		USC Upstate	W 86–49	8–1	17 – Stokes	7 – Wade	5 – Stokes	Bramlage Coliseum (6,911); Manhattan, KS
Dec 9, 2017*; 7:00 pm, FSKC		vs. Tulsa; Wichita Wildcat Classic	L 54–61	8–2	15 – Sneed	8 – Sneed	4 – 2 tied	Intrust Bank Arena (7,180); Wichita, KS
Dec 16, 2017*; 7:00 pm, FSKC		Southeast Missouri State	W 89–71	9–2	23 – Sneed	9 – Wainright	9 – Stokes	Bramlage Coliseum (7,389); Manhattan, KS
Dec 20, 2017*; 10:00 pm, ESPN2		vs. Washington State; Spokane Showcase	W 68–65	10–2	23 – Brown	9 – Mawien	7 – Stokes	Spokane Arena (12,058); Spokane, WA
Dec 29, 2017; 8:00 pm, ESPNU		at Iowa State	W 91–75	11–2 (1–0)	34 – Wade	8 – Wade	7 – Stokes	Hilton Coliseum (14,384); Ames, IA
Jan 1, 2018; 4:00 pm, ESPNU		No. 6 West Virginia	L 69–77	11–3 (1–1)	20 – Sneed	10 – Wade	6 – Stokes	Bramlage Coliseum (9,712); Manhattan, KS
Jan 6, 2018; 3:00 pm, FSSW+		at No. 18 Texas Tech	L 58–74	11–4 (1–2)	24 – Brown	5 – Wade	2 – 2 tied	United Supermarkets Arena (12,531); Lubbock, TX
Jan 10, 2018; 7:00 pm, ESPNews		Oklahoma State	W 86–82	12–4 (2–2)	38 – Brown	12 – Sneed	4 – Diarra	Bramlage Coliseum (7,740); Manhattan, KS
Jan 13, 2018; 12:00 pm, ESPN		at No. 12 Kansas; Sunflower Showdown	L 72–73	12–5 (2–3)	22 – Wade	7 – Sneed	6 – Brown	Allen Fieldhouse (16,300); Lawrence, KS
Jan 16, 2018; 8:00 pm, ESPNU		No. 4 Oklahoma	W 87–69	13–5 (3–3)	24 – Brown	7 – Wade	7 – Wade	Bramlage Coliseum (10,744); Manhattan, KS
Jan 20, 2018; 3:00 pm, ESPNU		No. 24 TCU	W 73–68	14–5 (4–3)	20 – Wade	6 – Wade	9 – Brown	Bramlage Coliseum (11,194); Manhattan, KS
Jan 22, 2018; 8:00 pm, ESPNU		at Baylor	W 90–83	15–5 (5–3)	34 – Brown	6 – Wade	6 – Diarra	Ferrell Center (4,787); Waco, TX
Jan 27, 2018*; 1:00 pm, ESPNU		Georgia; Big 12/SEC Challenge	W 56–51	16–5	20 – Wade	8 – Wade	5 – Diarra	Bramlage Coliseum (10,314); Manhattan, KS
Jan 29, 2018; 8:00 pm, ESPN		No. 7 Kansas; Sunflower Showdown	L 56–70	16–6 (5–4)	20 – Wade	8 – Wade	5 – Brown	Bramlage Coliseum (12,528); Manhattan, KS
Feb 3, 2018; 4:00 pm, ESPN2		at No. 15 West Virginia	L 51–89	16–7 (5–5)	17 – Wade	6 – Brown	4 – Stokes	WVU Coliseum (13,329); Morgantown, WV
Feb 7, 2018; 7:00 pm, LHN		at Texas	W 67–64	17–7 (6–5)	16 – Wade	6 – Brown	6 – Brown	Frank Erwin Center (9,211); Austin, TX
Feb 10, 2018; 7:00 pm, ESPNU		No. 7 Texas Tech	L 47–66	17–8 (6–6)	13 – Wade	11 – Wade	2 – 3 tied	Bramlage Coliseum (9,365); Manhattan, KS
Feb 14, 2018; 6:00 pm, ESPNU		at Oklahoma State	W 82–72	18–8 (7–6)	25 – Brown	6 – Sneed	4 – Wade	Gallagher-Iba Arena (7,017); Stillwater, OK
Feb 17, 2018; 12:00 pm, ESPNU		Iowa State	W 78–66	19–8 (8–6)	22 – Wade	8 – 2 tied	9 – Wade	Bramlage Coliseum (9,645); Manhattan, KS
Feb 21, 2018; 8:00 pm, ESPNU		Texas	W 58–48	20–8 (9–6)	16 – Brown	13 – Sneed	3 – Wade	Bramlage Coliseum (8,623); Manhattan, KS
Feb 24, 2018; 5:00 pm, ESPNU		at Oklahoma	L 77–86	20–9 (9–7)	28 – Brown	11 – Wade	3 – Wade	Lloyd Noble Center (12,102); Norman, OK
Feb 27, 2018; 8:00 pm, ESPNU		at TCU	L 59–66	20–10 (9–8)	24 – Wade	7 – Mawien	6 – Brown	Schollmaier Arena (6,682); Fort Worth, TX
Mar 3, 2018; 1:00 pm, ESPN		Baylor	W 77–66	21–10 (10–8)	25 – Wade	7 – Wade	6 – Sneed	Bramlage Coliseum (10,299); Manhattan, KS
Big 12 Tournament
Mar 8, 2018; 11:30 am, ESPN2	(4)	vs. (5) TCU; Quarterfinals	W 66–64 ^{OT}	22–10	16 – Mawien	9 – Mawien	5 – Diarra	Sprint Center (17,903); Kansas City, MO
Mar 9, 2018; 6:00 pm, ESPN	(4)	vs. (1) No. 9 Kansas; Semifinals	L 67–83	22–11	29 – Mawien	6 – Sneed	5 – Sneed	Sprint Center (18,223); Kansas City, MO
NCAA tournament
Mar 16, 2018; 5:50 pm, TNT	(9 S)	vs. (8 S) Creighton; First Round	W 69–59	23–11	18 – Brown	6 – Brown	3 – 3 tied	Spectrum Center (17,943); Charlotte, NC
Mar 18, 2018; 7:45 pm, truTV	(9 S)	vs. (16 S) UMBC; Second Round	W 50–43	24–11	18 – Brown	7 – Sneed	2 – 2 tied	Spectrum Center (18,485); Charlotte, NC
Mar 21, 2018; 8:37 pm, CBS	(9 S)	vs. (5 S) No. 18 Kentucky; Sweet Sixteen	W 61–58	25–11	22 – Sneed	9 – Sneed	3 – 2 tied	Philips Arena (15,616); Atlanta, GA
Mar 24, 2018; 5:09 pm, TBS	(9 S)	vs. (11 S) Loyola–Chicago; Elite Eight	L 62–78	25–12	16 – Sneed	6 – Sneed	4 – Stokes	Philips Arena (15,477); Atlanta, GA
*Non-conference game. ^{#}Rankings from AP Poll. (#) Tournament seedings in parentheses. S=South. All times are in Central Time.

== Rankings ==
Ranking movements Legend: ██ Increase in ranking ██ Decrease in ranking — = Not ranked RV = Received votes
	Week																				
Poll	Pre	1	2	3	4	5	6	7	8	9	10	11	12	13	14	15	16	17	18	19	Final
AP	—	—	—	—	—	RV	—	—	—	—	—	RV	RV	RV	—	—	RV	—	—	RV	Not released
Coaches	—	—	—	—	—	RV	—	—	—	—	—	RV	RV	RV	RV	—	RV	—	RV	RV	19

*AP does not release post-NCAA tournament rankings
