= Kanwar Sandhu (basketball) =

Indian basketball player

Kanwar Sandhu (born 30 October 1999) is an Indian basketball player from Punjab. He plays for the India men's national basketball team as a shooting guard. He plays for Punjab Warriors and Punjab in the domestic tournaments.

== Career ==
He made his debut for India as a youth player in 2015 when he represented the country in the FIBA Asia U16 Championship for Men. In 2023, he represented India in the FIBA Basketball World Cup 2023 Asian Qualifiers. In March 2025, he played 8 matches in the FIBA Asia Cup qualifiers at Manama, and in the crucial match against Bahrain, he scored 15 points to help India beat the higher-ranked team, along with Harsh Dagar. He went on to play the FIBA Asia Cup in August 2025. He was also part of the Indian team that played the World Cup 2027 Asian Qualifiers.
