= Hamilton High School (Memphis, Tennessee) =

Location
- 1363 E Person Avenue; Memphis, Tennessee 38106; United States
- Coordinates: 35.1001°N 90.0170°W

Information
- Type: Public
- Motto: Love Hamilton Absolutely
- School district: Shelby County School District
- NCES School ID: 470014801080
- Teaching staff: 31.69 (FTE)
- Enrollment: 647 (2023–2024)
  - Grade 9: 187
  - Grade 10: 157
  - Grade 11: 143
  - Grade 12: 160
- Student to teacher ratio: 20.42
- Colors: Royal blue; white
- Mascot: Wildcats
- Website: hamilton-hs.scsk12.org

Hamilton High School is a public high school in Memphis, Tennessee, located at 1363 E Person Avenue. Enrollment is 646 as of the 2019–2020 school year and the school is part of the Shelby County School District.

The school has a Junior ROTC program and requires a school uniform.

Hamilton High School graduates were among the Memphis State Eight that broke the color barrier at Memphis State in 1959. There was a clash between students and police during the Martin Luther King era. In 2011, organizers rallied to save the high school from closing.

School colors are royal blue and white. Wildcats are the mascot, and the school motto is "Love Hamilton Absolutely".

Former NFL player Curtis Weathers served as principal in 2015 and sought to transition the school into a Charter School. The school was part of a grade tampering controversy at several Shelby County schools in 2017 and had its principal demoted to a teaching position as a result.

97% of the students are black as of 2020.

== History ==
- On May 16, 2024, a fight broke out between two students at a graduation, which escalated into a bigger brawl between more students. A school security officer was injured.

=== Shooting incidents ===
- On February 5, 1982, a teacher who was collecting money outside of a school basketball game was robbed and murdered.
- In October 2004, a student fired a gun at another student but missed and no one was injured.
- On February 4, 2008, a student was shot in the leg after an argument by another student in a third floor classroom.
- On August 15, 2012, a person from across the street shot at the students who hit the deck in the school's parking lot. The police believe the shooting was gang related. No one was injured in the incident.
- On April 20, 2018, a coach was shot and carjacked in the school's parking lot.

== Notable alumni ==
- Big Ella, R&B singer
- Todd Day, basketball player
- Lois DeBerry, state legislator
- Young Dolph, rapper
- Eric Harris, football player
- Al Henry, basketball player
- Brian Ingram, football player
- Thomas Johnson, football player
- Larry Joyner, football player
- Dedric Lawson, Basketball player
- Lloyd Patterson, football player
- Keith Simpson, football player
- Bernard Williams, football player
- Shawne Williams, basketball player
