= Dedric Lawson =

American basketball player (born 1997)

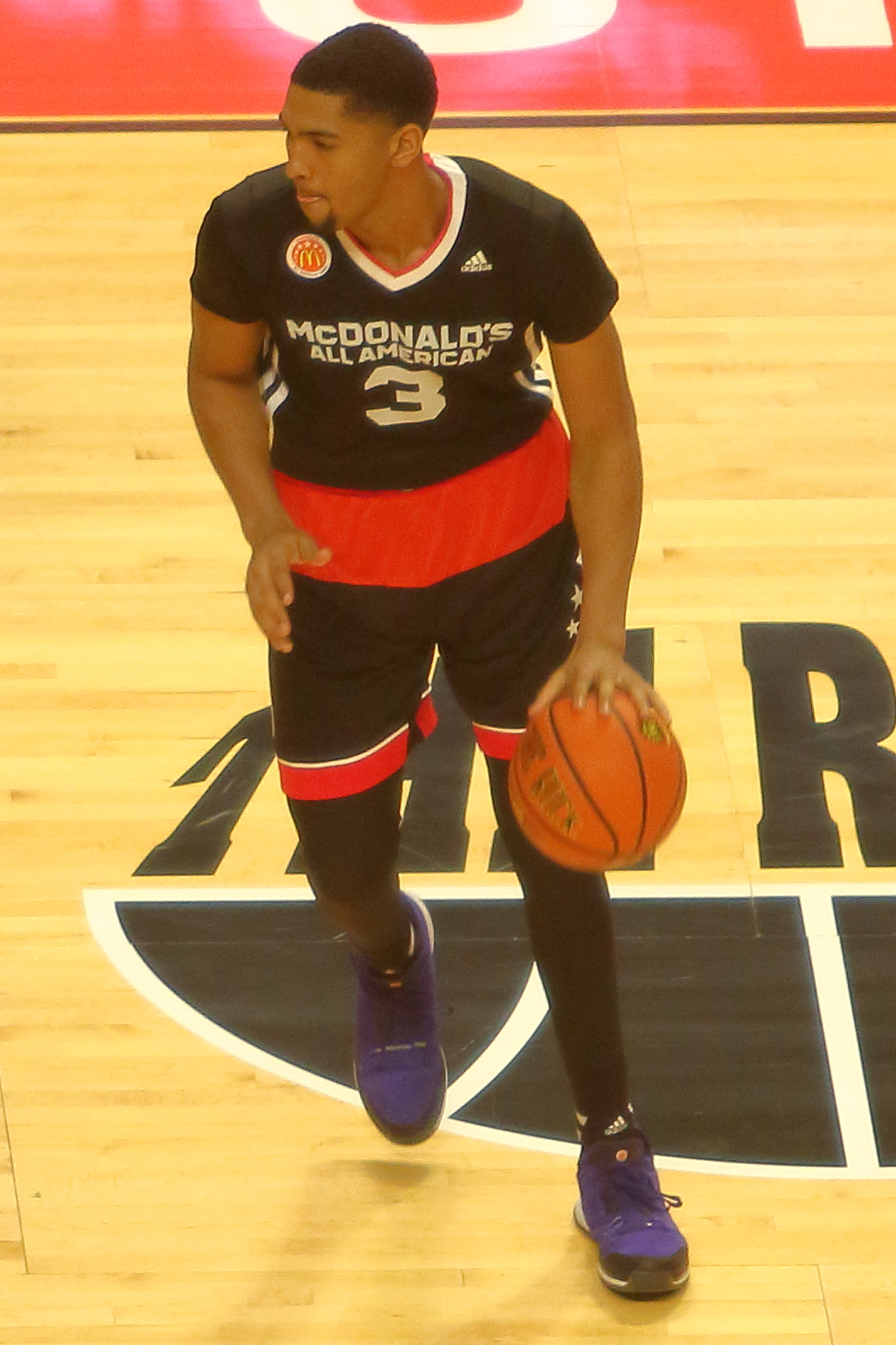
- Lawson at the 2015 McDonald's All-American Boys Game

No. 5 – Xinjiang Flying Tigers
- Position: Power forward
- League: CBA

Personal information
- Born: October 1, 1997 (age 29) Memphis, Tennessee, U.S.
- Listed height: 6 ft 9 in (2.06 m)
- Listed weight: 235 lb (107 kg)

Career information
- High school: Hamilton (Memphis, Tennessee)
- College: Memphis (2015–2017); Kansas (2018–2019)
- NBA draft: 2019: undrafted
- Playing career: 2019–present

Career history
- 2019–2020: Austin Spurs
- 2020–2021: Goyang Orion Orions
- 2021–2022: Beşiktaş
- 2022–2023: Goyang Carrot Jumpers
- 2023–2024: Wonju DB Promy
- 2024–present: Xinjiang Flying Tigers

Career highlights
- Second-team All-American – SN (2019); Third-team All-American – AP, NABC, USBWA (2019); Big 12 Newcomer of the Year (2019); First-team All-Big 12 (2019); First-team All-AAC (2017); AAC Rookie of the Year (2016); McDonald's All-American (2015); First-team Parade All-American (2015); Class AAA Tennessee Mr. Basketball (2015)
- Stats at Basketball Reference

Dedric Nicholaus Lawson (born October 1, 1997) is an American-Lebanese professional basketball player for the Xinjiang Flying Tigers of the Chinese Basketball Association (CBA). He played college basketball for the Memphis Tigers and the Kansas Jayhawks.

== High school career ==
Lawson attended Hamilton High School in Memphis, Tennessee alongside his older brother K. J. Lawson. As a freshman he averaged, 20.8 points, 13.4 rebounds, and 2.6 blocks per game. As a sophomore in 2013–14, Lawson averaged 16.7 points, 12.3 rebounds and 3.1 blocks per game. On September 11, 2014, Lawson reclassified from the class of 2016 to the class of 2015 so he could join K.J. at Memphis. As a senior, Lawson averaged 21.9 points, 15.4 rebounds, 3.2 blocks and 2.1 assists per game. Dedric was soon selected to both Jordan Brand Classic and 2015 McDonald's All-American Boys Game.

=== Recruiting ===
Lawson was rated as a four-star recruit and considered one of the top prospects in the class of 2016, before reclassifying to the 2015 class.

College recruiting
| Name | Hometown | School | Height | Weight | Commit date |
|---|---|---|---|---|---|
| Dedric Lawson; PF | Memphis, Tennessee | Hamilton | 6 ft 8 in (2.03 m) | 195 lb (88 kg) | Jul 20, 2014 |
| Dedric Lawson; PF | Recruit ratings: Scout: Rivals: 247Sports: ESPN: (89) | | | | |
Overall recruit ranking: Rivals: 33 ESPN: 26
Note: In many cases, Scout, Rivals, 247Sports, On3, and ESPN may conflict in their listings of height and weight.; In these cases, the average was taken. ESPN grades are on a 100-point scale.; Sources:

== College career ==
As a freshman at Memphis, Dedric averaged 15.8 points and 9.3 rebounds per game and tied Keith Lee’s Memphis record for double-doubles by a freshman. Lawson was named AAC Rookie of the Year as well as the Second Team All-AAC as a freshman. As a sophomore, Lawson was named to the First Team All-AAC. He averaged 19.2 points, 9.9 rebounds and 3.3 assists per game. In April 2017 he announced he was transferring to Kansas alongside K.J. and sat out a year as a redshirt per NCAA policy. In late July he was suspended by Kansas coach Bill Self after being involved in an altercation and did not participate in the team's exhibition trip to Italy.

During his lone season with Kansas, Lawson led the Big 12 in both scoring (19.4 ppg) and rebounding (10.3 rpg). Following Kansas' loss in the 2019 NCAA men's basketball tournament, Lawson announced his intention to forgo his final season of collegiate eligibility and declare for the 2019 NBA draft.

== Professional career ==
=== Austin Spurs (2019–2020) ===
After going undrafted in the 2019 NBA draft, Lawson was named in the Golden State Warriors roster for the 2019 NBA Summer League. He joined the San Antonio Spurs for training camp and ultimately was assigned to the Spurs’ NBA G League affiliate, the Austin Spurs. On March 9, 2020, Lawson posted 33 points and 10 rebounds for his 10th double-double of the season during a 117–114 win against the Oklahoma City Blue. He finished the season averaging 13.7 points and 8.1 rebounds in 42 games with Austin.

=== Goyang Orion Orions (2020–2021) ===
On July 9, 2020, the Goyang Orion Orions added Lawson to their roster.

=== Beşiktaş (2021–2022) ===
On June 2, 2021, he has signed with Beşiktaş Icrypex of the Turkish Super League.

He played for the Boston Celtics in the 2021 NBA summer league, missing a single three point shot in his 4-minute debut, a 85–83 win against the Atlanta Hawks in which he started.

== National team career ==
In July 2025, Lawson was naturalized as a Lebanese citizen, and will join the Lebanon men's national basketball team for the 2025 FIBA Asia Cup.

== College statistics ==
Legend
| GP | Games played | GS | Games started | MPG | Minutes per game |
| FG% | Field goal percentage | 3P% | 3-point field goal percentage | FT% | Free throw percentage |
| RPG | Rebounds per game | APG | Assists per game | SPG | Steals per game |
| BPG | Blocks per game | PPG | Points per game | **Bold** | Career high |

=== College ===
| Year | Team | GP | GS | MPG | FG% | 3P% | FT% | RPG | APG | SPG | BPG | PPG |
|---|---|---|---|---|---|---|---|---|---|---|---|---|
| 2015–16 | Memphis | 33 | 32 | 32.2 | .409 | .350 | .709 | 9.3 | 2.5 | 1.2 | 1.7 | 15.8 |
| 2016–17 | Memphis | 32 | 32 | **34.5** | .461 | .270 | .741 | 9.9 | **3.3** | **1.3** | **2.1** | 19.2 |
| 2018–19 | Kansas | **36** | **36** | 32.6 | **.490** | **.393** | **.815** | **10.3** | 1.7 | **1.3** | 1.1 | **19.4** |
| Career | | 101 | 100 | 33.1 | .455 | .332 | .757 | 9.9 | 2.5 | 1.2 | 1.6 | 18.2 |

== Personal life ==
Lawson also has two younger brothers, Chandler and Jonathan, who both played collegiate basketball for Memphis.
