= Pranav Prince =

Indian basketball player

Personal information
- National team: India
- Born: 19 June 2003 (age 23)

Sport
- Country: India
- Sport: Basketball
- Event: 3x3 Basketball

Pranav Prince (born 19 June 2003) is an Indian professional basketball player from Kerala. He plays for the India men's national basketball team as a forward. He plays for Tamil Nadu in the domestic tournaments.

== Early life and career ==
Prince is from Thiruvananthapuram, Kerala but resides in Tamil Nadu.

He first represented the Indian youth team in 2019 playing three matches in the FIBA U16 Asian Championship SABA Qualifier.

He made his senior India debut in the FIBA Asia Cup 2021 Qualifiers and played three matches in the FIBA Asia Cup in 2022. In 2023, he played the FIBA World Cup 2023 Asian Qualifiers. In 2023, he also played the FIBA Olympic Pre-Qualifying Tournament in Syria.

In 2025, he took part in the FIBA Asia Cup 2025 Qualifiers. In August 2025, he played the main event of the Asia Cup 2025 at Jeddah, Saudi Arabia. In the first match, India lost against higher ranked Jordan, where Prince scored 12 points. Later, he also played for the Indian team in the FIBA Basketball World Cup 2027 Asian Qualifiers.

In club competitions in 2024, he represented Tamil Nadu club in the FIBA West Asia Super League - Final 8 and in 2025, he played the SABA Club Championship, also for Tamil Nadu club.

In March 2025, he represented India in the FIBA 3x3 Asia Cup 2025, where India finished sixth. In September 2023, he represented India in the 19th Asian Games Hangzhou 2022 3x3 basketball.

=== Domestic ===
He represents Tamil Nadu in the domestic tournaments and was part of the 3x3 winning Tamil Nadu team in 2024 and 2025. In January 2026, he led the Tamil Nadu team which won the 5th 3x3 Senior National Basketball Championship for Men & Women. Earlier in January 2025, he was also part of the Tamil Nadu team which won the 4th 3x3 Senior National Basketball Championship for Men & Women.
