= 2017–18 Big East Conference men's basketball season =

- League: NCAA Division I
- Sport: Basketball
- Teams: 10
- TV partner(s): CBS, CBSSN, FOX, FS1, FSN

Regular season
- 2018 Big East Champions: Xavier
- Runners-up: Villanova
- Season MVP: Jalen Brunson, Villanova

Tournament
- Champions: Villanova
- Runners-up: Providence
- Finals MVP: Mikal Bridges, Villanova

Basketball seasons
- ← 2016–17 2018–19 →

2017–18 Big East men's basketball standings
	Conf.				Overall
Team	W		L	PCT	W		L	PCT
No. 3 Xavier	15	–	3	.833	29	–	6	.829
No. 2 Villanova †	14	–	4	.778	36	–	4	.900
Seton Hall	10	–	8	.556	22	–	12	.647
Creighton	10	–	8	.556	21	–	12	.636
Providence	10	–	8	.556	21	–	14	.600
Butler	9	–	9	.500	21	–	14	.600
Marquette	9	–	9	.500	21	–	14	.600
Georgetown	5	–	13	.278	15	–	15	.500
St. John's	4	–	14	.222	16	–	17	.485
DePaul	4	–	14	.222	11	–	20	.355
† 2018 Big East tournament winner Rankings from AP poll

The 2017–18 Big East Conference men's basketball season began with practices in October 2017, followed by the start of the 2017–18 NCAA Division I men's basketball season in November. This season marked the 39th year in the conference's history, but the fifth as a non-football conference, which officially formed on July 1, 2013. Conference play began in December 2017. For the first time since the reconfigured Big East formed, Villanova failed to win the regular-season title, with Xavier claiming the crown.

The 2018 Big East men's basketball tournament was held at Madison Square Garden in New York from March 7 through March 10, 2018. Villanova defeated Providence to win the tournament championship and receive the conference's automatic bid to the NCAA tournament.

Six Big East schools received bids to the NCAA tournament (Butler, Creighton, Providence, Seton Hall, Villanova, and Xavier). Only Villanova won more than one game in the Tournament, but the Wildcats defeated Michigan to win the NCAA Championship for the second time in three years.

Marquette received a bid to the National Invitation Tournament, where they advanced to the quarterfinals before losing to eventual NIT champions Penn State.

Villanova guard Jalen Brunson was named the Big East Player of the Year and was consensus National Player of the Year. Villanova freshman forward Omari Spellman was named Big East Freshman of the Year. Xavier head coach Chris Mack was named Big East coach of the year.

== Head coaches ==
=== Coaching changes ===
On March 23, 2017, Georgetown officials announced that John Thompson III had been fired. On April 2, it was reported that Patrick Ewing would replace Thompson as head coach.

On June 9, 2017, Butler head coach Chris Holtmann left to become the head coach at Ohio State. On June 12, the school hired Milwaukee head coach and Bulter alum LaVall Jordan as head coach.

=== Coaches ===
Team	Head coach	Previous job	Years at school	Overall record	Big East record	Big East titles	NCAA tournaments	NCAA Final Fours	NCAA Championships
Butler	LaVall Jordan	Milwaukee	1	21–14	9–9	0	1	0	0
Creighton	Greg McDermott	Iowa State	8	187–94	47––43	0	3	0	0
DePaul	Dave Leitao	Tulsa (asst.)	6	87–99	39–63	0	0	0	0
Georgetown	Patrick Ewing	Charlotte Hornets (asst.)	1	15–15	5–13	0	0	0	0
Marquette	Steve Wojciechowski	Duke (asst.)	4	73–59	31–41	0	1	0	0
Providence	Ed Cooley	Fairfield	7	144–94	64–62	0	5	0	0
Seton Hall	Kevin Willard	Iona	8	150–114	62–82	0	2	0	0
St. John's	Chris Mullin	None	3	39–60	12–42	0	0	0	0
Villanova	Jay Wright	Hofstra	17	422–165	191–103	6	13	3	2
Xavier	Chris Mack	Xavier (asst.)	9	215–97	57–33	1	8	0	0

Notes:

- Years at school includes 2017–18 season.
- Overall and Big East records are from time at current school and are through the end of the 2017–18 season.
- Mack's A-10 and McDermott's MVC conference records not included since teams began play in Big East.

== Preseason ==
=== Preseason poll ===
Prior to the season, the Big East conducted a poll of Big East coaches, coaches do not place their own team on their ballots.

Rank	Team
1.	Villanova (8)
2.	Seton Hall (1)
3.	Xavier (1)
4.	Providence
4.	Creighton
6.	St. John's
7.	Marquette
8.	Butler
9.	Georgetown
10.	DePaul
(first place votes)

=== Preseason All-Big East teams ===
Honor	Recipient
Preseason Player of the Year	Jalen Brunson, Villanova
Preseason All-Big East First Team	Kelan Martin, Butler
Preseason All-Big East First Team	Marcus Foster, Creighton
Preseason All-Big East First Team	Khadeen Carrington, Seton Hall
Preseason All-Big East First Team	Ángel Delgado, Seton Hall
Preseason All-Big East First Team	Trevon Bluiett, Xavier
Preseason All-Big East Second Team	Markus Howard, Marquette
Preseason All-Big East Second Team	Rodney Bullock, Providence
Preseason All-Big East Second Team	Kyron Cartwright, Providence
Preseason All-Big East Second Team	Marcus LoVett Jr., St. John's
Preseason All-Big East Second Team	Shamorie Ponds, St. John's
Preseason All-Big East Honorable Mention	Khyri Thomas, Creighton
Preseason All-Big East Honorable Mention	Desi Rodriguez, Seton Hall
Preseason All-Big East Honorable Mention	J. P. Macura, Xavier
Preseason Rookie of the Year	Omari Spellman, Villanova

== Regular season ==
=== Rankings ===
Legend
Increase in ranking
Decrease in ranking
Not ranked previous week
() First place votes

		Pre	Wk 2	Wk 3	Wk 4	Wk 5	Wk 6	Wk 7	Wk 8	Wk 9	Wk 10	Wk 11	Wk 12	Wk 13	Wk 14	Wk 15	Wk 16	Wk 17	Wk 18	Wk 19	Final
Butler	AP	RV	RV							RV					RV	RV	RV	RV			
Butler	C	RV	RV	RV	RV	RV									RV	RV	RV	RV			
Creighton	AP			RV	25	RV	RV	25	25	25	25	RV	RV	RV	RV	RV	RV	RV			
Creighton	C	RV	RV	RV	23	RV	25	24	23	25	22	RV	RV	RV	RV	25	RV	24			
DePaul	AP																				
DePaul	C																				
Georgetown	AP																				
Georgetown	C																				
Marquette	AP																				
Marquette	C																				
Providence	AP	RV	RV	RV	RV	RV							RV								
Providence	C	RV	RV	RV	RV	RV															
Seton Hall	AP	23	22	20	RV	19	15	23	23	21	13	19	RV	RV	RV			RV			
Seton Hall	C	23	23	22	24	19	15	22	24	21	15	19	RV	RV	RV	RV	RV	RV			
St. John's	AP																				
St. John's	C																				
Villanova	AP	6	5	5	4	4	1 (41)	1 (45)	1 (43)	3	1 (52)	1 (63)	1 (63)	1 (47)	1 (48)	3 (9)	3 (4)	4			
Villanova	C	6	6	5	4	4	1 (22)	1 (26)	1 (27)	3	1 (27)	1 (31)	1 (31)	1 (22)	1 (22)	2 (8)	3 (4)	5			
Xavier	AP	17	15	15	21	13	10	9	6	5	10	11	8	6	5	4 (5)	4	3			
Xavier	C	17	17	14	20	14	9	8	5	4	10	12	8	6	5	4 (1)	4	4			

=== Conference matrix ===
This table summarizes the head-to-head results between teams in conference play.

	Butler	Creighton	DePaul	Georgetown	Marquette	Providence	Seton Hall	St. John's	Villanova	Xavier
vs. Butler	–	1–1	0–2	1–1	0–2	1–1	2–0	1–1	1–1	2–0
vs. Creighton	1–1	–	0–2	0–2	2–0	1–1	1–1	0–2	1–1	2–0
vs. DePaul	2–0	2–0	–	1–1	1–1	1–1	2–0	1–1	2–0	2–0
vs. Georgetown	1–1	2–0	1–1	–	2–0	2–0	1–1	0–2	2–0	2–0
vs. Marquette	2–0	0–2	1–1	0–2	–	1–1	0–2	1–1	2–0	2–0
vs. Providence	1–1	1–1	1–1	0–2	1–1	–	2–0	0–2	1–1	1–1
vs. Seton Hall	0–2	1–1	0–2	1–1	2–0	0–2	–	0–2	2–0	2–0
vs. St. John's	1–1	2–0	1–1	2–0	1–1	2–0	2–0	–	1–1	2–0
vs. Villanova	1–1	1–1	0–2	0–2	0–2	1–1	0–2	1–1	–	0–2
vs. Xavier	0–2	0–2	0–2	0–2	0–2	1–1	0–2	0–2	2–0	–
Total	9–9	10–8	4–14	5–13	9–9	10–8	10–8	4–14	14–4	15–3

=== Player of the week ===
Throughout the season, the Big East Conference named a player of the week and a freshman of the week each Monday.

Week	Player of the week	Freshman of the week
November 13, 2017	Kelan Martin, Butler	Omari Spellman, Villanova
November 20, 2017	Trevon Bluiett, Xavier	Ty-Shon Alexander, Creighton
November 27, 2017	Jalen Brunson, Villanova	Mitch Ballock, Creighton
December 4, 2017	Desi Rodriguez, Seton Hall	Omari Spellman (2), Villanova
December 11, 2017	Markus Howard, Marquette	Mitch Ballock (2), Creighton
December 18, 2017	Jalen Brunson (2), Villanova	Omari Spellman (3), Villanova
December 26, 2017	Marcus Foster, Creighton	Mitch Ballock (3), Creighton
January 2, 2018	Kelan Martin (2), Butler	Jamal Cain, Marquette
January 8, 2018	Markus Howard (2), Marquette	Jahvon Blair, Georgetown
January 15, 2018	Kelan Martin (3), Butler	Naji Marshall, Xavier
January 22, 2018	J. P. Macura, Xavier	Omari Spellman (4), Villanova
January 29, 2018	Marcus Foster (2), Creighton	Naji Marshall (2), Xavier
February 5, 2018	Shamorie Ponds, St. John's	Omari Spellman (5), Villanova
February 12, 2018	Shamorie Ponds (2), St. John's	Jamorko Pickett, Georgetown
February 19, 2018	Mikal Bridges, Villanova	Naji Marshall (3), Xavier
February 26, 2018	Khadeen Carrington, Seton Hall	Naji Marshall (4), Xavier
March 4, 2018	Andrew Rowsey, Marquette	Omari Spellman (6), Villanova

== Honors and awards ==
=== Big East Awards ===
2018 Big East Men's Basketball Individual Awards
Award	Recipient(s)
Player of the Year	Jalen Brunson, G., Villanova
Coach of the Year	Chris Mack, Xavier
Defensive Player of the Year	Khyri Thomas, G., Creighton
Freshman of the Year	Omari Spellman, G., Villanova
Most Improved Player of the Year	Myles Powell, F., Seton. Hall
Scholar-Athlete of the Year	Jalen Brunson, G., Butler
Sixth Man Award	Donte DiVincenzo, G., Villanova
Sportsmanship Award	Tyler Wideman, F., Butler

2018 Big East Men's Basketball All-Conference Teams
First Team	Second Team	Honorable Mention	All-Freshman Team
Trevon Bluiett†, Xavier; Jalen Brunson†, Villanova; Mikal Bridges, Villanova; Marcus Foster, Creighton; Kelan Martin†, Butler; Shamorie Ponds, St. John's	Ángel Delgado, Seton Hall; Marcus Derrickson, Georgetown; Markus Howard, Marquette; Desi Rodriguez, Seton Hall; Khyri Thomas, Creighton	Andrew Rowsey, Marquette; Kyron Cartwright, Providence	Mitch Ballock, Creighton; Jahvon Blair, Georgetown; Naji Marshall†, Xavier; Jamorko Pickett†, Georgetown; Omari Spellman†, Villanova; Nate Watson, Providence
†unanimous selection Sources

== Postseason ==
=== 2018 Big East tournament ===
First round March 7
8	Georgetown	77
9	St. John's	88
7	Marquette	72
10	DePaul	69

Quarterfinals; March 8
1	Xavier	88
9	St. John's	60
4	Creighton	68
5	Providence	72*
2	Villanova	94
7	Marquette	70
3	Seton Hall	74
6	Butler	75

Semifinals; March 9
1	Xavier	72
5	Providence	75*
2	Villanova	87
6	Butler	68

Championship; March 10
5	Providence	66
2	Villanova	76*

=== NCAA tournament ===
The winner of the Big East tournament, Villanova, received the conference's automatic bid to the 2018 NCAA Division I men's basketball tournament.

Seed	Region	School	First Four	First round	Second round	Sweet Sixteen	Elite Eight	Final Four	Championship
1	East	Villanova	N/A	defeated (16) Radford 87–61	defeated (9) Alabama 81–58	defeated (5) West Virginia 90–78	defeated (3) Texas Tech 71–59	defeated (1) Kansas 95–79	defeated (3) Michigan 79–62
1	West	Xavier	N/A	defeated (16) Texas Southern 103–82	eliminated by (9) Florida State 70–75				
8	South	Creighton	N/A	eliminated by (9) Kansas State 59–69					
8	Midwest	Seton Hall	N/A	defeated (9) NC State 94–83	eliminated by (1) Kansas 79–83				
10	East	Butler	N/A	defeated (7) Arkansas 79–62	eliminated by (2) Purdue 73–76				
10	West	Providence	N/A	eliminated by (7) Texas A&M 69–73					
		W–L (%):	0–0 (–)	4–2 (.667)	1–3 (.250)	1–0 (1.000)	1–0 (1.000)	1–0 (1.000)	1–0 (1.000) Total: 9–5 (.643)

=== National Invitation tournament ===
Marquette received an invitation to the National Invitation Tournament.

Seed	Bracket	School	First round	Second round	Quarterfinals	Semifinals	Finals
2	Notre Dame	Marquette	defeated (7) Harvard 67–60	defeated (3) Oregon 101–92	eliminated by (4) Penn State		
		W–L (%):	1–0 (1.000)	1–0 (1.000)	0–1 (.000)	0–0 (–)	0–0 (–) Total: 2–1 (.667)
