= 2017–18 Seton Hall Pirates men's basketball team =

American college basketball season

2017–18 Seton Hall Pirates men's basketball

NCAA tournament, Second Round
- Conference: Big East Conference
- Record: 22–12 (10–8 Big East)
- Head coach: Kevin Willard (8th season)
- Assistant coaches: Shaheen Holloway; Fred Hill; Grant Billmeier
- Home arena: Prudential Center; Walsh Gymnasium

2017–18 Big East men's basketball standings
	Conf.				Overall
Team	W		L	PCT	W		L	PCT
No. 3 Xavier	15	–	3	.833	29	–	6	.829
No. 2 Villanova †	14	–	4	.778	36	–	4	.900
Seton Hall	10	–	8	.556	22	–	12	.647
Creighton	10	–	8	.556	21	–	12	.636
Providence	10	–	8	.556	21	–	14	.600
Butler	9	–	9	.500	21	–	14	.600
Marquette	9	–	9	.500	21	–	14	.600
Georgetown	5	–	13	.278	15	–	15	.500
St. John's	4	–	14	.222	16	–	17	.485
DePaul	4	–	14	.222	11	–	20	.355
† 2018 Big East tournament winner Rankings from AP poll

The 2017–18 Seton Hall Pirates men's basketball team represented Seton Hall University in the 2017–18 NCAA Division I men's basketball season. They were led by eighth-year head coach Kevin Willard. The Pirates played their home games at the Prudential Center in Newark, New Jersey and Walsh Gymnasium in South Orange, New Jersey as members of the Big East Conference. They finished the season 22–12, 10–8 in Big East play to finish in a three-way tie for third place. In the Big East tournament, they lost to Butler in the quarterfinals. They received an at-large bid to the NCAA tournament as the No. 8 seed in the Midwest region. There they defeated NC State in the first round before losing to Kansas in the second round.

== Previous season ==
The Pirates finished the 2016–17 season 21–12, 10–8 in Big East play to finish in a four-way tie for third place. As the No. 5 seed in the Big East tournament, they defeated Marquette before losing to Villanova in the semifinals. They received an at-large bid to the NCAA tournament as a No. 9 seed in the South region where they lost to 8-seeded Arkansas on a controversial flagrant foul call late in the game in the first round.

== Offseason ==
=== Returning players ===
Following the season, junior forward Ángel Delgado declared himself eligible of the NBA draft, but did not hire an agent. On May 22, 2017, he withdrew his name from the draft and announced he would return to Seton Hall for his senior season. Junior guard Khadeen Carringon also announced he would make himself eligible for the NBA draft, but also withdrew his name from the draft to return to the Hall for his senior season.

=== Departures ===
Name	Number	Pos.	Height	Weight	Year	Hometown	Notes
Jevon Thomas	2	G	6'1"	185	RS Junior	Queens, NY	Graduate transferred to UT Permian Basin
Dalton Soffer	21	G	6'6"	195	Sophomore	San Diego, CA	Graduate transferred to Cal State San Marcos
Myles Carter	23	F	6'9"	220	Sophomore	Chicago, IL	Dismissed from the team
Rashed Anthony	25	F	6'9"	235	RS Junior	Orangeburg, SC	Transferred to Saint Louis
Madison Jones	30	G	6'2"	160	Senior	Raleigh, NC	Graduated
Manny Anderson	35	G	6'4"	190	Freshman	Franklin, NJ	Walk-on; didn't return

=== Incoming transfers ===
Name	Number	Pos.	Height	Weight	Year	Hometown	Previous School
Quincy McKnight	30	G	6'3"	180	Junior	Bridgeport, CT	Transferred from Sacred Heart. Under NCAA transfer rules, McKnight will have to sit out from the 2017–18 season. Will have two years of remaining eligibility.
Taurean Thompson	33	F	6'10"	220	Junior	Jersey City, NJ	Transferred from Syracuse. Under NCAA transfer rules, Thompson will have to sit out for the 2017–18 season. Will have two years of remaining eligibility.
Romaro Gill	35	C	7'0"	235	Junior	St. Thomas, Jamaica	Junior college transferred from Vincennes University.

=== Class of 2017 recruits ===
College recruiting
Name	Hometown	School	Height	Weight	Commit date
Myles Cale #17 SG	Middletown, DE	Appoquinimink High School	6 ft 3 in (1.91 m)	195 lb (88 kg)	Mar 11, 2016
Myles Cale #17 SG	Recruit ratings: Scout: Rivals: (85)				
Jordan Walker; PG	Port Washington, NY	St. Patrick Prep	5 ft 10 in (1.78 m)	160 lb (73 kg)	
Jordan Walker; PG	Recruit ratings: Scout: Rivals: (NR)				
Sandro Mamukelashvili; PF	Tbilisi, Georgia	Montverde Academy	6 ft 11 in (2.11 m)	230 lb (100 kg)	Apr 19, 2017
Sandro Mamukelashvili; PF	Recruit ratings: Scout: Rivals: (NR)				
Overall recruit ranking:
Note: In many cases, Scout, Rivals, 247Sports, On3, and ESPN may conflict in their listings of height and weight.; In these cases, the average was taken. ESPN grades are on a 100-point scale.; Sources: "2017 Team Ranking". Rivals.

== Preseason ==
In its annual preseason preview, Blue Ribbon Yearbook ranked Seton Hall No. 15 in the country. Senior forward Ángel Delgado was named a fourth team All-American.

Seton Hall was picked to finish second in the Big East preseason Coaches' Poll. Khadeen Carrington and Angel Delgado were named to the preseason All-Big East First Team.

== Roster ==
2017–18 Seton Hall Pirates men's basketball team
Players
Coaches

Pos.	#	Name	Height	Weight	Year	Previous school	Hometown
G	0	Khadeen Carrington	6 ft 4 in (1.93 m)	195 lb (88 kg)	Sr	Bishop Loughlin Memorial High School	Brooklyn, New York
F	1	Michael Nzei	6 ft 8 in (2.03 m)	205 lb (93 kg)	RS Jr	Our Savior New American School	Makurdi, Nigeria
G	2	Jordan Walker	5 ft 11 in (1.8 m)	155 lb (70 kg)	Fr	The Patrick School (NJ)	Port Washington, New York
G	4	Eron Gordon	6 ft 3 in (1.91 m)	200 lb (91 kg)	So	Cathedral High School (IN)	Indianapolis, Indiana
G	13	Myles Powell	6 ft 2 in (1.88 m)	195 lb (88 kg)	Fr	Trenton Catholic Academy	Trenton, New Jersey
F	14	Ismael Sanogo	6 ft 8 in (2.03 m)	215 lb (98 kg)	Sr	East Side High School (NJ)	Newark, New Jersey
F	20	Desi Rodriguez	6 ft 6 in (1.98 m)	220 lb (100 kg)	Sr	Abraham Lincoln High School (NY)	Bronx, New York
G	21	Shavar Reynolds Jr. (W)	6 ft 2 in (1.88 m)	195 lb (88 kg)	Fr	Manchester Township High School	Manchester, Jersey
G	22	Myles Cale	6 ft 5 in (1.96 m)	200 lb (91 kg)	Fr	Appoquinimink High School	Middletown, Delaware
F	23	Sandro Mamukelashvili	6 ft 10 in (2.08 m)	230 lb (104 kg)	Fr	Montverde Academy	Tbilisi, Georgia
G/F	25	Philip Flory (W)	6 ft 5 in (1.96 m)	190 lb (86 kg)	Fr	Oshkosh North High School	Oshkosh, Wisconsin
G	30	Quincy McKnight (I) (redshirt)	6 ft 4 in (1.93 m)	180 lb (82 kg)	Jr	Sacred Heart	Bridgeport, Connecticut
C	31	Ángel Delgado	6 ft 10 in (2.08 m)	245 lb (111 kg)	Sr	St. Patrick High School (NJ)	Bajos de Haina, Dominican Republic
F	33	Taurean Thompson (I) (redshirt)	6 ft 10 in (2.08 m)	225 lb (102 kg)	So	Syracuse	Jersey City, New Jersey
C	35	Romaro Gill	7 ft 2 in (2.18 m)	245 lb (111 kg)	Jr	Vincennes	St. Thomas, Jamaica

Head coach

- Kevin Willard (Pittsburgh)

Assistant coach(es)

- Shaheen Holloway (Seton Hall)
- Fred Hill (Montclair State)
- Grant Billmeier (Seton Hall)

Legend

- (C) Team captain
- (S) Suspended
- (I) Ineligible
- (W) Walk-on
- Injured
- Current redshirt

Roster

== Schedule and results ==
Date time, TV	Rank^{#}	Opponent^{#}	Result	Record	High points	High rebounds	High assists	Site (attendance) city, state
Exhibition
November 2, 2017*; 7:30 pm	No. 23	La Salle; Charity Exhibition	W 87–74	–	22 – Rodriguez	9 – Delgado	5 – Tied	Walsh Gymnasium (1,140); South Orange, NJ
November 4, 2017*; 4:00 pm	No. 23	LIU Post	W 77–43	–	18 – Rodriguez	13 – Mamukelashvili	2 – Tied	Walsh Gymnasium (1,215); South Orange, NJ
Non-conference regular season
November 10, 2017*; 6:30 pm, FS2	No. 23	Fairleigh Dickinson; NIT Season Tip-Off campus game	W 90–68	1–0	17 – Rodriguez	10 – Delgado	6 – Carrington	Prudential Center (6,733); Newark, NJ
November 12, 2017*; 1:30 pm, FS1	No. 23	Monmouth; NIT Season Tip-Off campus game	W 75–65	2–0	18 – Powell	11 – Delgado	4 – Carrington	Prudential Center (7,139); Newark, NJ
November 15, 2017*; 6:30 pm, FS1	No. 22	Indiana; Gavitt Tipoff Games	W 84–68	3–0	23 – Rodriguez	11 – Delgado	5 – Carrington	Prudential Center (8,452); Newark, NJ
November 18, 2017*; 4:00 pm, FS2	No. 22	NJIT	W 82–53	4–0	19 – Rodriguez	9 – Mamukelashvili	5 – Carrington	Prudential Center (6,743); Newark, NJ
November 23, 2017*; 6:00 pm, ESPNU	No. 20	vs. Rhode Island; NIT Season Tip-Off semifinals	L 74–75	4–1	21 – Powell	14 – Delgado	3 – Delgado	Barclays Center (1,874); Brooklyn, NY
November 24, 2017*; 9:45 pm, ESPNews	No. 20	vs. Vanderbilt; NIT Season Tip-Off 3rd place game	W 72–59	5–1	27 – Rodriguez	8 – Tied	4 – Gordon	Barclays Center (3,952); Brooklyn, NY
November 30, 2017*; 6:30 pm, FS1		vs. No. 22 Texas Tech; Under Armour Reunion	W 89–79	6–1	24 – Rodriguez	7 – Rodriguez	4 – Tied	Madison Square Garden (6,081); New York, NY
December 3, 2017*; 4:00 pm, ESPN2		at No. 17 Louisville; Billy Minardi Classic	W 79–77	7–1	29 – Rodriguez	13 – Delgado	4 – Carrington	KFC Yum! Center (19,244); Louisville, KY
December 9, 2017*; 3:00 pm, FOX	No. 19	VCU; Never Forget Tribute Classic	W 90–67	8–1	17 – Rodriguez	13 – Delgado	5 – Powell	Prudential Center (9,112); Newark, NJ
December 12, 2017*; 7:00 pm, FS1	No. 15	Saint Peter's	W 84–61	9–1	18 – Delgado	11 – Delgado	5 – Carrington	Walsh Gymnasium (1,655); South Orange, NJ
December 16, 2017*; 12:00 pm, BTN	No. 15	at Rutgers; Rivalry/Garden State Hardwood Classic	L 65–71	9–2	18 – Powell	21 – Delgado	4 – Carrington	Louis Brown Athletic Center (8,318); Piscataway, NJ
December 20, 2017*; 7:00 pm, FS1	No. 23	Wagner	W 89–68	10–2	26 – Carrington	10 – Delgado	5 – Tied	Prudential Center (6,481); Newark, NJ
December 23, 2017*; 12:00 pm, FSN	No. 23	Manhattan	W 74–62	11–2	15 – Tied	18 – Delgado	5 – Rodriguez	Prudential Center (8,001); Newark, NJ
Big East regular season
December 28, 2017; 6:30 pm, FS1	No. 23	No. 25 Creighton	W 90–84	12–2 (1–0)	23 – Rodriguez	14 – Tied	5 – Delgado	Prudential Center (9,824); Newark, NJ
December 31, 2017; 5:00 pm, FS1	No. 23	St. John's	W 75–70	13–2 (2–0)	24 – Carrington	12 – Delgado	6 – Delgado	Prudential Center (8,456); Newark, NJ
January 6, 2018; 2:30 pm, FS1	No. 21	at Butler	W 90–87	14–2 (3–0)	29 – Carrington	15 – Delgado	6 – Tied	Hinkle Fieldhouse (8,855); Indianapolis, IN
January 9, 2018; 9:00 pm, CBSSN	No. 13	at Marquette	L 64–84	14–3 (3–1)	14 – Sanogo	10 – Delgado	7 – Carrington	BMO Harris Bradley Center (12,901); Milwaukee, WI
January 13, 2018; 12:00 pm, FS1	No. 13	Georgetown	W 74–61	15–3 (4–1)	19 – Powell, Rodriguez	13 – Delgado	6 – Carrington	Prudential Center (10,481); Newark, NJ
January 17, 2018; 8:45 pm, FS1	No. 19	at Creighton	L 63–80	15–4 (4–2)	19 – Powell	10 – Sanogo	5 – Carrington	CenturyLink Center (17,705); Omaha, NE
January 20, 2018; 2:30 pm, FOX	No. 19	No. 11 Xavier	L 64–73	15–5 (4–3)	19 – Rodriguez	18 – Delgado	5 – Tied	Prudential Center (10,481); Newark, NJ
January 28, 2018; 4:00 pm, CBSSN		at DePaul	W 86–70	16–5 (5–3)	21 – Powell	19 – Delgado	5 – Tied	Wintrust Arena (5,650); Chicago, IL
January 31, 2018; 7:00 pm, FS1		Providence	W 73–57	17–5 (6–3)	23 – Carrington	14 – Delgado	7 – Carrington	Prudential Center (8,434); Newark, NJ
February 4, 2018; 12:00 pm, FOX		at No. 1 Villanova	L 76–92	17–6 (6–4)	20 – Rodriguez	9 – Delgado	4 – Tied	Wells Fargo Center (16,115); Philadelphia, Pa
February 7, 2018; 7:00 pm, FS1		Marquette	L 85–88	17–7 (6–5)	21 – Rodriguez	7 – Tied	5 – Carrington	Prudential Center (8,210); Newark, NJ
February 10, 2018; 4:00 pm, CBSSN		at Georgetown	L 80–83	17–8 (6–6)	25 – Powell	12 – Delgado	9 – Carrington	Capital One Arena (11,037); Washington, D.C.
February 14, 2018; 9:00 pm, FS1		at No. 4 Xavier	L 90–102	17–9 (6–7)	30 – Powell	7 – Tied	5 – Walker	Cintas Center (10,512); Cincinnati, OH
February 18, 2018; 1:00 pm, FS1		DePaul	W 82–77	18–9 (7–7)	33 – Rodriguez	19 – Delgado	5 – Carrington	Prudential Center (10,110); Newark, NJ
February 21, 2018; 6:30 pm, FS1		at Providence^{A}	W 89–77	19–9 (8–7)	25 – Carrington	11 – Delgado	4 – Powell	Dunkin' Donuts Center (11,432); Providence, RI
February 24, 2018; 12:00 pm, FOX		at St. John's	W 81–74 ^{OT}	20–9 (9–7)	22 – Carrington	13 – Delgado	8 – Powell	Madison Square Garden (18,840); New York, NY
February 28, 2018; 8:30 pm, FS1		No. 4 Villanova	L 68–69 ^{OT}	20–10 (9–8)	23 – Carrington	8 – Delgado	7 – Carrington	Prudential Center (13,711); Newark, NJ
March 3, 2018; 8:00 pm, CBSSN		Butler	W 77–70	21–10 (10–8)	25 – Carrington	10 – Tied	5 – Powell	Prudential Center (9,743); Newark, NJ
Big East tournament
March 8, 2018; 9:30 pm, FS1	(3)	vs. (6) Butler; Quarterfinals	L 74–75	21–11	17 – Carrington	9 – Delgado	7 – Carrington	Madison Square Garden (19,812); New York, NY
NCAA tournament
March 15, 2018*; 4:30 pm, TBS	(8 MW)	vs. (9 MW) NC State; First Round	W 94–83	22–11	26 – Carrington	10 – Sanogo	4 – Delgado	Intrust Bank Arena (14,390); Wichita, KS
March 17, 2018*; 7:10 pm, TBS	(8 MW)	vs. (1 MW) No. 4 Kansas; Second Round	L 79–83	22–12	28 – Carrington	23 – Delgado	5 – Carrington	Intrust Bank Arena (14,385); Wichita, KS
*Non-conference game. ^{#}Rankings from AP Poll. (#) Tournament seedings in parentheses. All times are in Eastern Time.

- ^A Game was suspended with 13:03 left in the 2nd half due to unsafe floor conditions and resumed at noon on February 22 at Alumni Hall.

== Rankings ==
Ranking movements Legend: ██ Increase in ranking ██ Decrease in ranking RV = Received votes
	Week																			
Poll	Pre	1	2	3	4	5	6	7	8	9	10	11	12	13	14	15	16	17	18	Final
AP	23	22	20	RV	19	15	23	23	21	13	19	RV	RV							Not released
Coaches	23	23^	22	24	19	15	22	24	21	15	19	RV	RV							RV

^Coaches did not release a Week 2 poll.
*AP does not release post-NCAA tournament rankings
