= 2017–18 St. John's Red Storm men's basketball team =

American college basketball season

2017–18 St. John's Red Storm men's basketball
- Conference: Big East Conference
- Record: 16–17 (4–14 Big East)
- Head coach: Chris Mullin (3rd season)
- Assistant coaches: Mitch Richmond; Matt Abdelmassih; Greg St. Jean
- Home arena: Carnesecca Arena; Madison Square Garden

2017–18 Big East men's basketball standings
	Conf.				Overall
Team	W		L	PCT	W		L	PCT
No. 3 Xavier	15	–	3	.833	29	–	6	.829
No. 2 Villanova †	14	–	4	.778	36	–	4	.900
Seton Hall	10	–	8	.556	22	–	12	.647
Creighton	10	–	8	.556	21	–	12	.636
Providence	10	–	8	.556	21	–	14	.600
Butler	9	–	9	.500	21	–	14	.600
Marquette	9	–	9	.500	21	–	14	.600
Georgetown	5	–	13	.278	15	–	15	.500
St. John's	4	–	14	.222	16	–	17	.485
DePaul	4	–	14	.222	11	–	20	.355
† 2018 Big East tournament winner Rankings from AP poll

The 2017–18 St. John's Red Storm men's basketball team represented St. John's University during the 2017–18 NCAA Division I men's basketball season. They were coached by alumnus and Naismith Memorial Basketball Hall of Fame member Chris Mullin, in his third year at the school. They played their home games at Carnesecca Arena and Madison Square Garden as members of the Big East Conference. They finished the season 16–17, 4–14 in Big East play to finish in tie for ninth place. They beat Georgetown in the first round of the Big East tournament before losing to Xavier in the quarterfinals.

== Previous season ==
The Red Storm finished the 2016–17 season with a record of 14–19, 7–11 in Big East play to finish in eighth place in conference. They defeated Georgetown in the first round of the Big East tournament before losing to Villanova in the quarterfinals.

== Offseason ==
=== Departures ===
Name	Number	Pos.	Height	Weight	Year	Hometown	Notes
Malik Ellison	0	G	6'6"	215	Sophomore	Voorhees, New Jersey	Transferred to Pittsburgh
Federico Mussini	4	G	6'2"	170	Sophomore	Reggio Emilia, Italy	Entered the LBA
Sidney Wilson	15	F	6'7"	170	Freshman	Bronx, NY	Transferred to Connecticut (pre-season)
Richard Freudenberg	20	F	6'9"	210	Freshman	Heidelberg, Germany	Entered the BBL
Darien Williams	45	F	6'8"	235	Senior	San Francisco, California	Graduated; Transferred to Nevada

=== Incoming transfers ===
Name	Pos.	Height	Weight	Year	Hometown	Notes
Sedee Keita	F	6'9"	240	Sophomore	Philadelphia, Pennsylvania	transfer from South Carolina (3 yrs eligibility remaining)
Mikey Dixon	G	6'2"	170	Sophomore	New Castle, Delaware	transfer from Quinnipiac (3 yrs eligibility remaining)

=== 2017 recruiting class ===
College recruiting information
Name	Hometown	School	Height	Weight	Commit date
Sidney Wilson; SF	Bronx, NY	Brewster Academy	6 ft 7 in (2.01 m)	170 lb (77 kg)	May 20, 2017
Sidney Wilson; SF	Recruit ratings: Scout: Rivals: 247Sports: (81)				
Bryan Trimble Jr. SG	Kansas City, MO	Sunrise Christian Academy	6 ft 3 in (1.91 m)	220 lb (100 kg)	Jun 12, 2017
Bryan Trimble Jr. SG	Recruit ratings: Scout: Rivals: 247Sports: (79)				
Boubacar Diakite; SF	Bamako, Mali	Our Savior New American School	6 ft 8 in (2.03 m)	185 lb (84 kg)	Jun 13, 2016
Boubacar Diakite; SF	Recruit ratings: Scout: Rivals: 247Sports: (78)				
Overall recruit ranking:
Note: In many cases, Scout, Rivals, 247Sports, On3, and ESPN may conflict in their listings of height and weight.; In these cases, the average was taken. ESPN grades are on a 100-point scale.; Sources: "2017 Team Ranking". Rivals.

=== 2018 recruiting class ===
College recruiting information (2018)
Name	Hometown	School	Height	Weight	Commit date
Greg Williams Jr. SG	Lafayette, LA	Lafayette Christian Academy	6 ft 3 in (1.91 m)	190 lb (86 kg)	Nov 15, 2017
Greg Williams Jr. SG	Recruit ratings: Scout: Rivals: 247Sports: (82)				
Josh Roberts; SF	Troy, AL	Montverde Academy	6 ft 9 in (2.06 m)	210 lb (95 kg)	Sep 8, 2017
Josh Roberts; SF	Recruit ratings: Scout: Rivals: 247Sports: (77)				
Marcellus Earlington; PF	Ramsey, NJ	Don Bosco Prep	6 ft 5 in (1.96 m)	240 lb (110 kg)	Feb 28, 2018
Marcellus Earlington; PF	Recruit ratings: Scout: Rivals: 247Sports: (N/A)				
Overall recruit ranking:
Note: In many cases, Scout, Rivals, 247Sports, On3, and ESPN may conflict in their listings of height and weight.; In these cases, the average was taken. ESPN grades are on a 100-point scale.; Sources: "2018 Team Ranking". Rivals.

== Preseason ==
In a preseason poll of Big East coaches, the Red Storm was picked to finish in sixth place in the Big East. Sophomore guards Marcus LoVett and Shamorie Ponds were named to the preseason All-Big East second team.

== Roster ==
2017–18 St. John's Red Storm men's basketball team
Players
Coaches

Pos.	#	Name	Height	Weight	Year	Previous school	Hometown
F/C	0	Sedee Keita (redshirt)	6 ft 9 in (2.06 m)	240 lb (109 kg)	So	South Carolina	Philadelphia, PA
G/F	1	Bashir Ahmed	6 ft 7 in (2.01 m)	210 lb (95 kg)	Sr	Hutchinson C.C.	Bronx, NY
G	2	Shamorie Ponds	6 ft 1 in (1.85 m)	175 lb (79 kg)	So	Thomas Jefferson	Brooklyn, NY
G	3	Mikey Dixon (redshirt)	6 ft 2 in (1.88 m)	170 lb (77 kg)	So	Quinnipiac	New Castle, DE
G	4	Jay Camus (W)	5 ft 10 in (1.78 m)	170 lb (77 kg)	Jr	Manhattan	Queens, NY
G	5	Justin Simon	6 ft 5 in (1.96 m)	215 lb (98 kg)	RS So	Arizona	Temcula, CA
F	10	Amar Alibegović	6 ft 9 in (2.06 m)	240 lb (109 kg)	Sr	Instituto Tecnico Minerva	Rome, Italy
F	11	Tariq Owens	6 ft 11 in (2.11 m)	205 lb (93 kg)	RS Jr	Tennessee	Odenton, MD
G	12	Bryan Trimble Jr.	6 ft 3 in (1.91 m)	220 lb (100 kg)	Fr	Sunrise Christian	Kansas City, MO
F	13	Marvin Clark II	6 ft 7 in (2.01 m)	230 lb (104 kg)	RS Jr	Michigan State	Kansas City, MO
F	14	Kassoum Yakwe	6 ft 7 in (2.01 m)	210 lb (95 kg)	Jr	Our Savior New American	Bamako, Mali
G	20	Marcus LoVett Jr. (injured)	6 ft 0 in (1.83 m)	180 lb (82 kg)	RS So	Morgan Park	Fort Wayne, IN
F	22	Boubacar Diakite (redshirt)	6 ft 8 in (2.03 m)	185 lb (84 kg)	Fr	Our Savior New American	Bamako, Mali
G	23	Justin Cole (W)	6 ft 2 in (1.88 m)	190 lb (86 kg)	So	Archbishop Molloy	Rockville Centre, NY
G	24	Brandon Lawrence (W)	6 ft 2 in (1.88 m)	175 lb (79 kg)	So	Moreau Catholic	Union City, CA

Head coach

- Chris Mullin (St. John's)

Assistant coach(es)

- Mitch Richmond
- Matt Abdelmassih
- Greg St. Jean

Legend

- (C) Team captain
- (S) Suspended
- (I) Ineligible
- (W) Walk-on
- Injured
- Current redshirt

Roster

== Schedule and results ==
Date time, TV	Rank^{#}	Opponent^{#}	Result	Record	High points	High rebounds	High assists	Site (attendance) city, state
Exhibition
Nov 1, 2017*; 7:00 pm, ESPN3		American International	W 84–52		21 – Ponds	14 – Clark	7 – Simon	Carnesecca Arena (3,869); Queens, NY
Nov 5, 2017*; 1:00 pm, BTN Plus		at Rutgers; Disaster Relief Charity Exhibition	L 78–80		25 – Ponds	7 – Tied	6 – Ponds	Louis Brown Athletic Center (1,551); Piscataway, NJ
Regular season
Nov 10, 2017*; 7:00 pm, FCS		New Orleans	W 77–61	1–0	23 – Lovett	7 – Ponds	6 – Ponds	Carnesecca Arena (4,921); Queens, NY
Nov 14, 2017*; 6:30 pm, FS2		Central Connecticut	W 80–55	2–0	21 – Ponds	11 – Simon	4 – Tied	Carnesecca Arena (4,043); Queens, NY
Nov 16, 2017*; 6:30 pm, FS1		Nebraska; Gavitt Tipoff Games	W 79–56	3–0	22 – Ponds	12 – Simon	5 – Ponds	Carnesecca Arena (4,652); Queens, NY
Nov 20, 2017*; 6:30 pm, FS1		Molloy	W 71–43	4–0	14 – Tied	11 – Simon	9 – Simon	Carnesecca Arena (4,424); Queens, NY
Nov 23, 2017*; 2:00 pm, ESPNU		vs. Oregon State; AdvoCare Invitational quarterfinals	W 82–77	5–0	26 – Ponds	6 – Tied	6 – Ponds	HP Field House (2,712); Lake Buena Vista, FL
Nov 24, 2017*; 11:00 am, ESPNews		vs. Missouri; AdvoCare Invitational semifinals	L 82–90	5–1	31 – Ponds	9 – Simon	8 – Simon	HP Field House (2,367); Lake Buena Vista, FL
Nov 26, 2017*; 12:00 pm, ESPNU		vs. UCF; Advocare Invitational 3rd place game	W 46–43	6–1	12 – Lovett	10 – Ponds	4 – Ponds	HP Field House (1,712); Lake Buena Vista, FL
Dec 2, 2017*; 4:30 pm, FS1		Sacred Heart	W 90–55	7–1	22 – Ponds	11 – Owens	7 – Ponds	Carnesecca Arena (4,643); Queens, NY
Dec 5, 2017*; 11:30 pm, ESPNU		vs. Grand Canyon; Valley of the Sun Shootout	W 68–60	8–1	28 – Ponds	11 – Simon	4 – Ponds	Talking Stick Resort Arena (8,907); Phoenix, AZ
Dec 8, 2017*; 8:00 pm, P12N		vs. No. 16 Arizona State; Basketball Hall of Fame Classic	L 70–82	8–2	18 – Ponds	8 – Ahmed	7 – Ponds	Staples Center (6,456); Los Angeles, CA
Dec 17, 2017*; 4:30 pm, FS1		Iona; Madison Square Garden Holiday Festival	W 69–59	9–2	16 – Ponds	11 – Ahmed	3 – Simon	Madison Square Garden (9,515); New York, NY
Dec 20, 2017*; 4:30 pm, ESPNU		vs. Saint Joseph's; Basketball Hall of Fame Holiday Showcase	W 77–73	10–2	28 – Ponds	11 – Simon	9 – Simon	Mohegan Sun Arena (5,518); Uncasville, CT
Dec 28, 2017; 7:00 pm, FSN		Providence	L 72–94	10–3 (0–1)	20 – Clark	8 – Clark	6 – Ponds	Carnesecca Arena (5,602); Queens, NY
Dec 31, 2017; 5:00 pm, FS1		at No. 23 Seton Hall	L 70–75	10–4 (0–2)	19 – Owens	14 – Owens	10 – Simon	Prudential Center (8,456); Newark, NJ
Jan 3, 2018; 8:00 pm, FS1		at Creighton	L 71–78	10–5 (0–3)	21 – Ahmed	5 – Tied	6 – Simon	CenturyLink Center (16,167); Omaha, NE
Jan 6, 2018; 2:00 pm, FSN		DePaul	L 74–91	10–6 (0–4)	21 – Ahmed	7 – Tied	6 – Ponds	Carnesecca Arena (5,602); Queens, NY
Jan 9, 2018; 6:30 pm, FS1		Georgetown	L 66–69	10–7 (0–5)	17 – Ponds	7 – Clark	6 – Ponds	Madison Square Garden (9,406); New York, NY
Jan 13, 2018; 8:00 pm, FBN		No. 1 Villanova	L 71–78	10–8 (0–6)	37 – Ponds	7 – Tied	3 – Simon	Madison Square Garden (17,123); New York, NY
Jan 17, 2018; 8:30 pm, CBSSN		at No. 11 Xavier	L 82–88	10–9 (0–7)	28 – Simon	6 – Owens	6 – Simon	Cintas Center (10,224); Cincinnati, OH
Jan 20, 2018; 12:00 pm, FS1		at Georgetown	L 89–93 ^{2OT}	10–10 (0–8)	33 – Ponds	10 – Simon	8 – Ponds	Capital One Arena (8,976); Washington, D.C.
Jan 23, 2018; 8:30 pm, FS1		Creighton	L 63–68	10–11 (0–9)	17 – Simon	9 – Simon	7 – Simon	Carnesecca Arena (4,771); Queens, NY
Jan 27, 2018; 2:30 pm, FS1		at Butler	L 45–70	10–12 (0–10)	13 – Owens	9 – Owens	5 – Simon	Hinkle Fieldhouse (9,129); Indianapolis, IN
Jan 30, 2018; 8:30 pm, CBSSN		No. 6 Xavier	L 68–73	10–13 (0–11)	31 – Ponds	10 – Ahmed	5 – Ponds	Carnesecca Arena (5,344); Queens, NY
Feb 3, 2018*; 12:00 pm, FOX		No. 4 Duke; The Garf	W 81–77	11–13	33 – Ponds	7 – Ponds	7 – Simon	Madison Square Garden (19,812); New York, NY
Feb 7, 2018; 7:00 pm, CBSSN		at No. 1 Villanova	W 79–75	12–13 (1–11)	26 – Ponds	10 – Simon	7 – Simon	Wells Fargo Center (10,900); Philadelphia, PA
Feb 10, 2018; 12:00 pm, FSN		Marquette	W 86–78	13–13 (2–11)	44 – Ponds	11 – Simon	6 – Simon	Carnesecca Arena (5,602); Queens, NY
Feb 14, 2018; 9:00 pm, CBSSN		at DePaul	W 77–76	14–13 (3–11)	26 – Ponds	6 – Owens	10 – Ponds	Wintrust Arena (4,690); Chicago, IL
Feb 21, 2018; 8:30 pm, FSN		at Marquette	L 73–85	14–14 (3–12)	19 – Tied	7 – Ponds	6 – Tied	BMO Harris Bradley Center (12,624); Milwaukee, WI
Feb 24, 2018; 12:00 pm, FOX		Seton Hall	L 74–81 ^{OT}	14–15 (3–13)	25 – Ponds	10 – Clark II	6 – Ponds	Madison Square Garden (18,840); New York, NY
Feb 28, 2018; 9:00 pm, CBSSN		Butler	W 75–68 ^{2OT}	15–15 (4–13)	24 – Simon	10 – Simon	5 – Simon	Carnesecca Arena (5,602); Queens, NY
Mar 3, 2018; 12:00 pm, FSN		at Providence	L 57–61	15–16 (4–14)	14 – Clark	7 – Ahmed	9 – Simon	Dunkin' Donuts Center (12,627); Providence, RI
Big East tournament
Mar 7, 2018; 7:00 pm, FS1	(9)	vs. (8) Georgetown; First round	W 88–77	16–16	26 – Ponds	10 – Simon	6 – Simon	Madison Square Garden (16,866); New York, NY
Mar 8, 2018; 12:00 pm, FS1	(9)	vs. (1) No. 3 Xavier; Quarterfinals	L 60–88	16–17	18 – Clark	7 – Ponds	3 – Ponds	Madison Square Garden (17,647); New York, NY
*Non-conference game. ^{#}Rankings from AP Poll. (#) Tournament seedings in parentheses. All times are in Eastern Time.
