= 2017–18 Providence Friars men's basketball team =

American college basketball season

2017–18 Providence Friars men's basketball
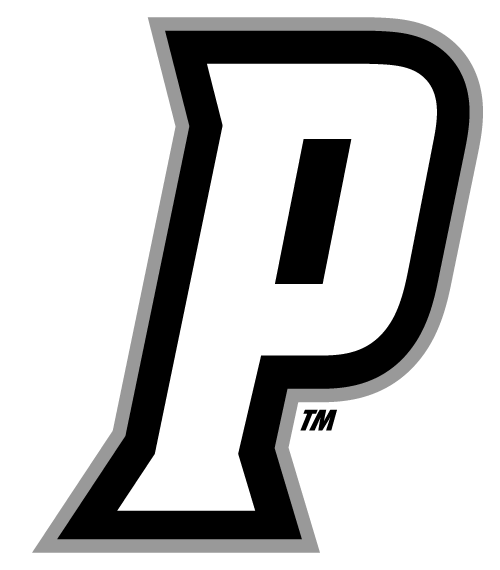

2K Sports Classic champions

NCAA tournament, First Round
- Conference: Big East Conference
- Record: 21–14 (10–8 Big East)
- Head coach: Ed Cooley (7th season)
- Assistant coaches: Jeff Battle; Brian Blaney; Ivan Thomas
- Home arena: Dunkin' Donuts Center

2017–18 Big East men's basketball standings
	Conf.				Overall
Team	W		L	PCT	W		L	PCT
No. 3 Xavier	15	–	3	.833	29	–	6	.829
No. 2 Villanova †	14	–	4	.778	36	–	4	.900
Seton Hall	10	–	8	.556	22	–	12	.647
Creighton	10	–	8	.556	21	–	12	.636
Providence	10	–	8	.556	21	–	14	.600
Butler	9	–	9	.500	21	–	14	.600
Marquette	9	–	9	.500	21	–	14	.600
Georgetown	5	–	13	.278	15	–	15	.500
St. John's	4	–	14	.222	16	–	17	.485
DePaul	4	–	14	.222	11	–	20	.355
† 2018 Big East tournament winner Rankings from AP poll

The 2017–18 Providence Friars men's basketball team represented Providence College in the 2017–18 NCAA Division I men's basketball season. The Friars, led by seventh-year head coach Ed Cooley, played their home games at the Dunkin' Donuts Center as members of the Big East Conference. They finished the season 21–14, 10–8 in Big East play to finish in a three-way tie for third place. As the No. 5 seed in the Big East tournament, they defeated Creighton and No. 1-seeded Xavier in back-to-back overtime games to advance to the championship game. In a third straight overtime game, the Friars fell to Villanova in the championship game. They received an at-large bid to the NCAA tournament as the No. 10 seed in the West region where they lost to Texas A&M in the first round.

== Previous season ==
The Friars finished the 2016–17 season 20–13, 10–8 in Big East play to finish in a four-way tie for third place. As the No. 3 seed in the Big East tournament, they lost in the quarterfinals to Creighton. They received an at-large bid to the NCAA tournament as a No. 11 seed where they lost to USC in the First Four.

== Offseason ==
=== Departures ===
Name	Number	Pos.	Height	Weight	Year	Hometown	Notes
Bryan Donovan	2	G	6'0"	180	Freshman	Gainesville, FL	Transferred to Roger Williams University
Casey Woodring	12	G	6'2"	190	Senior	Darien, CT	Graduated
Ricky Council II	22	G	6'5"	200	Sophomore	Durham, NC	Transferred to UMBC
Ryan Fazekas	35	G	6'8"	215	Sophomore	Chesterton, IN	Transferred to Valparaiso

=== 2017 recruiting class ===
College recruiting
Name	Hometown	School	Height	Weight	Commit date
Makai Ashton-Langford; PG	Worcester, MA	Brewster Academy	6 ft 2 in (1.88 m)	185 lb (84 kg)	Apr 10, 2017
Makai Ashton-Langford; PG	Recruit ratings: Scout: Rivals: (89)				
Dajour Dickens; C	Hampton, VA	Bethel High School	6 ft 10 in (2.08 m)	205 lb (93 kg)	Feb 27, 2016
Dajour Dickens; C	Recruit ratings: Scout: Rivals: (80)				
Nate Watson; C	Arlington, VA	Bishop O'Connell High School	6 ft 8 in (2.03 m)	220 lb (100 kg)	Sep 10, 2016
Nate Watson; C	Recruit ratings: Scout: Rivals: (80)				
Overall recruit ranking:
Note: In many cases, Scout, Rivals, 247Sports, On3, and ESPN may conflict in their listings of height and weight.; In these cases, the average was taken. ESPN grades are on a 100-point scale.; Sources: "2017 Team Ranking". Rivals.

== Preseason ==
Prior to the season, Providence was picked to finish fourth in a poll of Big East coaches.

== Roster ==
2017–18 Providence Friars men's basketball team
Players
Coaches

Pos.	#	Name	Height	Weight	Year	Previous school	Hometown
C	0	Nate Watson	6 ft 10 in (2.08 m)	260 lb (118 kg)	Fr	Bishop O'Connell High School	Arlington, Virginia
G	1	Makai Ashton-Langford	6 ft 3 in (1.91 m)	185 lb (84 kg)	Fr	Brewster Academy	Worcester, Massachusetts
G	4	Maliek White	6 ft 3 in (1.91 m)	190 lb (86 kg)	So	George Wythe High School	Richmond, Virginia
F	5	Rodney Bullock (C)	6 ft 8 in (2.03 m)	225 lb (102 kg)	RS Sr	Kecoughtan High School	Hampton, Virginia
G	10	Andrew Fonts (W)	6 ft 2 in (1.88 m)	170 lb (77 kg)	Fr	Portsmouth Abbey School	Portsmouth, Rhode Island
G	11	Alpha Diallo	6 ft 7 in (2.01 m)	211 lb (96 kg)	So	Brewster Academy	New York, New York
F	13	Kalif Young	6 ft 9 in (2.06 m)	255 lb (116 kg)	So	Orangeville Prep	Vaughan, Ontario
F	15	Emmitt Holt	6 ft 7 in (2.01 m)	240 lb (109 kg)	Sr	Webster Schroeder; Indian Hills CC	Webster, New York
F	21	Jalen Lindsay	6 ft 7 in (2.01 m)	227 lb (103 kg)	Sr	Huntington Prep	Murfreesboro, Tennessee
G	24	Kyron Cartwright (C)	5 ft 11 in (1.8 m)	185 lb (84 kg)	Sr	Compton High School	Compton, California
F	25	Drew Edwards	6 ft 4 in (1.93 m)	190 lb (86 kg)	RS So	Calvert Hall	Perry Hall, Maryland
C	33	Dajour Dickens	7 ft 0 in (2.13 m)	220 lb (100 kg)	Fr	Bethel High School	Hampton, Virginia
F	34	Tom Planek (W)	6 ft 7 in (2.01 m)	210 lb (95 kg)	Sr	Fenwick High School	Oak Park, Illinois
G	44	Isaiah Jackson	6 ft 6 in (1.98 m)	225 lb (102 kg)	RS Jr	Villages Charter School; George Mason	Gainesville, Florida

Head coach

- Ed Cooley (Stonehill)

Assistant coach(es)

- Jeff Battle (Marshall)
- Brian Blaney (Roanoke)
- Ivan Thomas (VCU)

Legend

- (C) Team captain
- (S) Suspended
- (I) Ineligible
- (W) Walk-on
- Injured
- Current redshirt

Roster

== Schedule and results ==
Date time, TV	Rank^{#}	Opponent^{#}	Result	Record	Site (attendance) city, state
Exhibition
Oct 25, 2017*; 7:00 pm, Fox Sports Go		vs. Connecticut; ARC disaster relief exhibition	W 90–76	–	Mohegan Sun Arena (6,415); Uncasville, CT
Oct 28, 2017*; 4:00 pm		Carleton (ON)	L 67–77	–	Dunkin' Donuts Center (5,216); Providence, RI
Nov 4, 2017*; 2:00 pm		Baruch	W 87–53	–	Dunkin' Donuts Center (3,855); Providence, RI
Non-conference regular season
Nov 10, 2017*; 7:00 pm, FSN		Houston Baptist; 2K Sports Classic campus-site game	W 84–55	1–0	Alumni Hall (2,620); Providence, RI
Nov 13, 2017*; 6:30 pm, FS1		No. 14 Minnesota; Gavitt Tipoff Games	L 74–86	1–1	Dunkin' Donuts Center (10,214); Providence, RI
Nov 16, 2017*; 9:30 pm, ESPN2		vs. Washington; 2K Sports Classic semifinals	W 77–70	2–1	Madison Square Garden (6,104); New York City, NY
Nov 17, 2017*; 7:30 pm, ESPN2		vs. Saint Louis; 2K Sports Classic championship	W 90–63	3–1	Madison Square Garden (6,173); New York City, NY
Nov 22, 2017*; 7:00 pm, FS1		Belmont; 2K Sports Classic campus-site game	W 66–65	4–1	Dunkin' Donuts Center (6,857); Providence, RI
Nov 25, 2017*; 8:00 pm, FS1		Boston College	W 86–66	5–1	Dunkin' Donuts Center (10,806); Providence, RI
Nov 29, 2017*; 7:00 pm, FSN		Rider	W 88–84	6–1	Dunkin' Donuts Center (7,255); Providence, RI
Dec 2, 2017*; 5:00 pm, CBSSN		at Rhode Island; Ocean State Cup	L 68–75	6–2	Ryan Center (7,959); Kingston, RI
Dec 6, 2017*; 7:00 pm, FS2		Brown; Ocean State Cup	W 77–72 ^{OT}	7–2	Dunkin' Donuts Center (6,087); Providence, RI
Dec 9, 2017*; 3:00 pm, NESN		at Massachusetts	L 63–72	7–3	Mullins Center (4,015); Amherst, MA
Dec 17, 2017*; 2:30 pm, FS1		Stony Brook	W 62–60	8–3	Dunkin' Donuts Center (5,742); Providence, RI
Dec 20, 2017*; 7:00 pm, ESPNU		vs. Houston; Hall of Fame Holiday Showcase	L 59–70	8–4	Mohegan Sun Arena (5,518); Uncasville, CT
Dec 22, 2017*; 6:30 pm, FS1		Sacred Heart	W 89–75	9–4	Dunkin' Donuts Center (6,452); Providence, RI
Big East regular season
Dec 28, 2017; 7:00 pm, FSN		at St. John's	W 94–72	10–4 (1–0)	Carnesecca Arena (5,602); Queens, NY
Dec 31, 2017; 2:30 pm, FS1		at No. 25 Creighton	L 64–83	10–5 (1–1)	CenturyLink Center Omaha (17,768); Omaha, NE
Jan 3, 2018; 6:30 pm, CBSSN		Marquette	L 90–95 ^{OT}	10–6 (1–2)	Dunkin' Donuts Center (8,375); Providence, RI
Jan 6, 2018; 12:00 noon, FOX		No. 5 Xavier	W 81–72	11–6 (2–2)	Dunkin' Donuts Center (12,630); Providence, RI
Jan 12, 2018; 8:30 pm, FS1		at DePaul	W 71–64	12–6 (3–2)	Wintrust Arena (5,354); Chicago, IL
Jan 15, 2018; 4:30 pm, FS1		Butler	W 70–60	13–6 (4–2)	Dunkin' Donuts Center (12,407); Providence, RI
Jan 20, 2018; 3:00 pm, CBSSN		Creighton	W 85–71	14–6 (5–2)	Dunkin' Donuts Center (12,927); Providence, RI
Jan 23, 2018; 6:30 pm, FS1		at No. 1 Villanova	L 69–89	14–7 (5–3)	Wells Fargo Center (8,565); Philadelphia, PA
Jan 31, 2018; 7:00 pm, FS1		at Seton Hall	L 57–73	14–8 (5–4)	Prudential Center (8,434); Newark, NJ
Feb 3, 2018; 2:30 pm, FS1		at Marquette	W 77–75	15–8 (6–4)	BMO Harris Bradley Center (18,958); Milwaukee, WI
Feb 6, 2018; 8:45 pm, FS1		Georgetown	W 73–69	16–8 (7–4)	Dunkin' Donuts Center (11,125); Providence, RI
Feb 10, 2018; 4:30 pm, FSN		DePaul	L 63–80	16–9 (7–5)	Dunkin' Donuts Center (12,892); Providence, RI
Feb 14, 2018; 7:00 pm, FS1		No. 3 Villanova	W 76–71	17–9 (8–5)	Dunkin' Donuts Center (12,887); Providence, RI
Feb 17, 2018; 12:00 noon, FOX		at Butler	L 54–69	17–10 (8–6)	Hinkle Fieldhouse (9,184); Indianapolis, IN
Feb 21, 2018; 6:30 pm, FS1		Seton Hall^{A}	L 77–89	17–11 (8–7)	Dunkin' Donuts Center (11,432); Providence, RI
Feb 24, 2018; 12:00 noon, CBSSN		at Georgetown	W 74–69	18–11 (9–7)	Capital One Arena (10,681); Washington, D.C.
Feb 28, 2018; 6:30 pm, FS1		at No. 3 Xavier	L 74–84	18–12 (9–8)	Cintas Center (10,715); Cincinnati, OH
Mar 3, 2018; 12:00 pm, FSN		St. John's	W 61–57	19–12 (10–8)	Dunkin' Donuts Center (12,627); Providence, RI
Big East tournament
Mar 8, 2018; 2:30 pm, FS1	(5)	vs. (4) Creighton; Quarterfinals	W 72–68 ^{OT}	20–12	Madison Square Garden (17,647); New York City, NY
Mar 9, 2018; 6:30 pm, FS1	(5)	vs. (1) No. 3 Xavier; Semifinals	W 75–72 ^{OT}	21–12	Madison Square Garden (19,812); New York City, NY
Mar 10, 2018; 5:30 pm, FOX	(5)	vs. (2) No. 2 Villanova; Championship	L 66–76 ^{OT}	21–13	Madison Square Garden (19,812); New York City, NY
NCAA tournament
Mar 16, 2018*; 12:15 pm, CBS	(10 W)	vs. (7 W) Texas A&M; First Round	L 69–73	21–14	Spectrum Center (18,489); Charlotte, NC
*Non-conference game. ^{#}Rankings from AP Poll. (#) Tournament seedings in parentheses. W=West. All times are in Eastern Time.

- ^A Game was suspended with 13:03 left in the 2nd half due to unsafe floor conditions and resumed at noon on February 22 at Alumni Hall.
