= 2018 Big East men's basketball tournament =

- Classification: Division I
- Season: 2017–18
- Teams: 10
- Site: Madison Square Garden; New York City
- Champions: Villanova (4th title)
- Winning coach: Jay Wright (3rd title)
- MVP: Mikal Bridges (Villanova)
- Attendance: 93,949
- Television: FS1, FOX

2017–18 Big East men's basketball standings
	Conf.				Overall
Team	W		L	PCT	W		L	PCT
No. 3 Xavier	15	–	3	.833	29	–	6	.829
No. 2 Villanova †	14	–	4	.778	36	–	4	.900
Seton Hall	10	–	8	.556	22	–	12	.647
Creighton	10	–	8	.556	21	–	12	.636
Providence	10	–	8	.556	21	–	14	.600
Butler	9	–	9	.500	21	–	14	.600
Marquette	9	–	9	.500	21	–	14	.600
Georgetown	5	–	13	.278	15	–	15	.500
St. John's	4	–	14	.222	16	–	17	.485
DePaul	4	–	14	.222	11	–	20	.355
† 2018 Big East tournament winner Rankings from AP poll

The 2018 Big East men's basketball tournament was the postseason tournament men's basketball tournament for the Big East Conference. It was held from March 7 through March 10, 2018 at Madison Square Garden in New York City. No. 2 seed Villanova defeated No. 5 seed Providence in the championship game to win the tournament and receive the conference's bid to the NCAA tournament. It was Villanova's second straight tournament championship.

Providence participated in three straight overtime games in the tournament, setting a Big East tournament record.

== Seeds ==
All 10 Big East schools participated in the tournament. Teams were seeded by the conference record with tie-breaking procedures to determine the seeds for teams with identical conference records. The top six teams received first-round byes. Seeding for the tournament was determined at the close of the regular conference season. Notably, no Big East team had secured its tournament seed before the final day of the 2017–18 regular season.

Seed	School	Conference	Tiebreaker 1	Tiebreaker 2
1	Xavier	15–3		
2	Villanova	14–4		
3	Seton Hall	10–8	3–1 vs. Creighton, Providence	
4	Creighton	10–8	2–2 vs. Seton Hall, Providence	
5	Providence	10–8	1–3 vs. Seton Hall, Creighton	
6	Butler	9–9	2–0 vs. Marquette	
7	Marquette	9–9	0–2 vs. Butler	
8	Georgetown	5–13		
9	St. John's	4–14	1–1 vs. DePaul	0–2 vs. Xavier, 1–1 vs. Villanova
10	DePaul	4–14	1–1 vs. St. John's	0–2 vs. Xavier, 0–2 vs. Villanova

== Schedule ==
Game	Time	Matchup	Score	Television	Attendance
First round – Wednesday, March 7
1	7:00 pm	No. 8 Georgetown vs. No. 9 St. John's	77–88	FS1	16,866
2	9:30 pm	No. 7 Marquette vs. No. 10 DePaul	72–69	FS1	16,866
Quarterfinals – Thursday, March 8
3	12:00 pm	No. 1 Xavier vs. No. 9 St. John's	88–60	FS1	17,647
4	2:30 pm	No. 4 Creighton vs. No. 5 Providence	68–72 ^{OT}	FS1	17,647
5	7:00 pm	No. 2 Villanova vs. No. 7 Marquette	94–70	FS1	19,812
6	9:30 pm	No. 3 Seton Hall vs. No. 6 Butler	74–75	FS1	19,812
Semifinals – Friday, March 9
7	6:30 pm	No. 1 Xavier vs. No. 5 Providence	72–75 ^{OT}	FS1	19,812
8	9:30 pm	No. 2 Villanova vs. No. 6 Butler	87–60	FS1	19,812
Championship – Saturday, March 10
9	6:30 pm	No. 2 Villanova vs. No. 5 Providence	76–66 ^{OT}	FOX	19,812
Game times in Eastern Time. Rankings denote tournament seed.

== Bracket ==
First round Wednesday, March 7 FS1
8	Georgetown	77
9	St. John's	88
7	Marquette	72
10	DePaul	69

Quarterfinals; Thursday, March 8 FS1
1	#3 Xavier	88
9	St. John's	60
4	Creighton	68
5	Providence	72*
2	#2 Villanova	94
7	Marquette	70
3	Seton Hall	74
6	Butler	75

Semifinals; Friday, March 9 FS1
1	#3 Xavier	72
5	Providence	75*
2	#2 Villanova	87
6	Butler	68

Championship; Saturday, March 10; FOX
5	Providence	66
2	#2 Villanova	76*

* denotes overtime period

== See also ==
- 2018 Big East women's basketball tournament
