= 2017–18 Marquette Golden Eagles men's basketball team =

American college basketball season

2017–18 Marquette Golden Eagles men's basketball
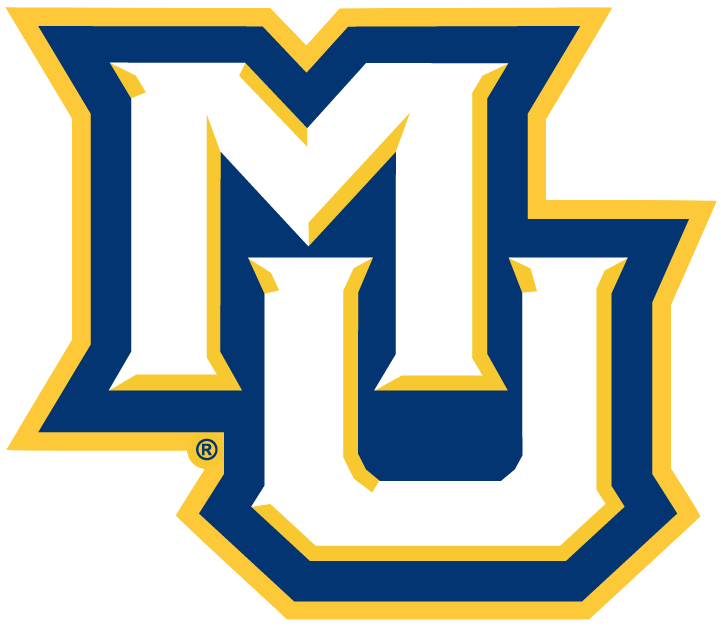

NIT, Quarterfinals
- Conference: Big East Conference|Big East
- Record: 21–14 (9–9 Big East)
- Head coach: Steve Wojciechowski (4th season)
- Assistant coaches: Chris Carrawell; Stan Johnson; Brett Nelson
- Home arena: BMO Harris Bradley Center; Al McGuire Center (NIT home games)

2017–18 Big East men's basketball standings
	Conf.				Overall
Team	W		L	PCT	W		L	PCT
No. 3 Xavier	15	–	3	.833	29	–	6	.829
No. 2 Villanova †	14	–	4	.778	36	–	4	.900
Seton Hall	10	–	8	.556	22	–	12	.647
Creighton	10	–	8	.556	21	–	12	.636
Providence	10	–	8	.556	21	–	14	.600
Butler	9	–	9	.500	21	–	14	.600
Marquette	9	–	9	.500	21	–	14	.600
Georgetown	5	–	13	.278	15	–	15	.500
St. John's	4	–	14	.222	16	–	17	.485
DePaul	4	–	14	.222	11	–	20	.355
† 2018 Big East tournament winner Rankings from AP poll

The 2017–18 Marquette Golden Eagles men's basketball team represented Marquette University in the 2017–18 NCAA Division I men's basketball season. The Golden Eagles, led by fourth-year head coach Steve Wojciechowski, played their home games at the BMO Harris Bradley Center as members of the Big East Conference. They finished the season 21–14, 9–9 in Big East play to finish in a tie for sixth place. As the No. 7 seed in the Big East tournament, they defeated DePaul in the first round before losing to eventual tournament champion Villanova in the quarterfinals. They received an at-large bid to the National Invitation Tournament where they defeated Harvard in the first round and Oregon in the second round before losing to Penn State in the quarterfinals.

This season was the last for the men's team playing at the Bradley Center, as they will open the new Fiserv Forum for the 2018–19 season.

== Previous season ==
The Golden Eagles finished the 2016–17 season 19–12, 10–8 in Big East play to finish in a four-way tie for third place. As the No. 4 seed in the Big East tournament, they lost to Seton Hall in the quarterfinals. They received an at-large bid to the NCAA tournament as a No. 10 seed in the East region where they lost to No. 7 South Carolina in the First Round, who eventually won the East Region and made it to the Final Four.

== Offseason ==
=== Departures ===
Name	Number	Pos.	Height	Weight	Year	Hometown	Reason for departure
Duane Wilson	1	G	6'2"	185	RS Junior	Milwaukee, WI	Graduate transferred to Texas A&M
Katin Reinhardt	22	G	6'6"	210	RS Senior	Dana Point, CA	Graduated
JaJuan Johnson	23	G	6'5"	205	Senior	Memphis, TN	Graduated
Luke Fischer	40	C	6'11"	250	RS Senior	Germantown, WI	Graduated
Deon Franklin	41	F	6'5"	215	RS Sophomore	Treviso, Italy	Walk-on; left the team for personal reasons
Haanif Cheatham	25	G	6'5	195	Junior	Fort Lauderdale, Florida	Left mid-season for personal reasons

=== Incoming transfers ===
Name	Number	Pos.	Height	Weight	Year	Hometown	Previous school
Ed Morrow	1	F	6'7"	213	Junior	Chicago, IL	Transferred from Nebraska. Under NCAA transfer rules, Morrow, Jr. will have to sit out for the 2017–18 season. Will have two years of remaining eligibility.
Harry Froling	21	C	6'11"	249	Sophomore	Townsville, Australia	Transferred from SMU. Under NCAA transfer rules, Froling will have to sit out for the 2017–18 season. Will have three years of remaining eligibility.

=== 2017 recruiting class ===
College recruiting
Name	Hometown	School	Height	Weight	Commit date
Jamal Cain #32 SF	Detroit, MI	Cornerstone Academy	6 ft 7 in (2.01 m)	175 lb (79 kg)	Jun 19, 2016
Jamal Cain #32 SF	Recruit ratings: Scout: Rivals: (81)				
Theo John #43 PF	Champlin, MN	Champlin High School	6 ft 8 in (2.03 m)	210 lb (95 kg)	Sep 13, 2016
Theo John #43 PF	Recruit ratings: Scout: Rivals: (79)				
Ikechukwu Eke; PF	Detroit, MI	Univ. of Detroit Jesuit High School	6 ft 9 in (2.06 m)	220 lb (100 kg)	Jun 19, 2016
Ikechukwu Eke; PF	Recruit ratings: Scout: Rivals: (NR)				
Greg Elliott; SG	Detroit, MI	East English Village Prep Academy	6 ft 4 in (1.93 m)	160 lb (73 kg)	Apr 3, 2017
Greg Elliott; SG	Recruit ratings: Scout: Rivals: (NR)				
Overall recruit ranking:
Note: In many cases, Scout, Rivals, 247Sports, On3, and ESPN may conflict in their listings of height and weight.; In these cases, the average was taken. ESPN grades are on a 100-point scale.; Sources: "2017 Team Ranking". Rivals.

=== 2018 Recruiting class ===
College recruiting (2018)
Name	Hometown	School	Height	Weight	Commit date
Joey Hauser #13 PF	Stevens Point, WI	Stevens Point Area Senior High School	6 ft 7 in (2.01 m)	210 lb (95 kg)	Jul 23, 2017
Joey Hauser #13 PF	Recruit ratings: Rivals: 247Sports: ESPN: (88)				
Overall recruit ranking:
Note: In many cases, Scout, Rivals, 247Sports, On3, and ESPN may conflict in their listings of height and weight.; In these cases, the average was taken. ESPN grades are on a 100-point scale.; Sources: "2018 Team Ranking". Rivals.

== Preseason ==
In a preseason poll of Big East coaches, the Eagles were picked to finish in seventh place in the Big East. Sophomore guard Markus Howard was named to the preseason All-Big East second team.

== Roster ==
2017–18 Marquette Golden Eagles men's basketball team
Players
Coaches

Pos.	#	Name	Height	Weight	Year	Previous school	Hometown
G	0	Markus Howard	5 ft 11 in (1.8 m)	175 lb (79 kg)	So	Findlay Prep	Chandler, Arizona
F	1	Ed Morrow (redshirt)	6 ft 7 in (2.01 m)	235 lb (107 kg)	Jr	Simeon Academy; Nebraska	Chicago, Illinois
G/F	2	Sacar Anim	6 ft 5 in (1.96 m)	205 lb (93 kg)	RS So	DeLaSalle High School (MN)	Minneapolis, Minnesota
F	4	Theo John	6 ft 9 in (2.06 m)	245 lb (111 kg)	Fr	Champlin Park High School	Minneapolis, Minnesota
G	5	Greg Elliott	6 ft 3 in (1.91 m)	170 lb (77 kg)	Fr	East English Village Prep	Detroit, Michigan
F	10	Sam Hauser	6 ft 8 in (2.03 m)	225 lb (102 kg)	So	Stevens Point Area Senior High School	Stevens Point, Wisconsin
C	12	Matt Heldt	6 ft 10 in (2.08 m)	245 lb (111 kg)	Jr	Neenah High School	Neenah, Wisconsin
F	13	Ike Eke	6 ft 9 in (2.06 m)	225 lb (102 kg)	Fr	University of Detroit Jesuit High School	Lagos, Nigeria
C	21	Harry Froling	6 ft 11 in (2.11 m)	250 lb (113 kg)	So	SMU	Townsville, Australia
F	22	Joey Hauser (redshirt)	6 ft 9 in (2.06 m)	215 lb (98 kg)	Fr	Stevens Point Area Senior High School	Stevens Point, Wisconsin
F	23	Jamal Cain	6 ft 7 in (2.01 m)	190 lb (86 kg)	Fr	Cornerstone Health & Technology High School	Pontiac, Michigan
G	30	Andrew Rowsey	5 ft 11 in (1.8 m)	180 lb (82 kg)	RS Sr	UNC Asheville	Lexington, Virginia
G	41	Mike Lelito (W)	6 ft 5 in (1.96 m)	185 lb (84 kg)	RS Fr	John Hersey High School	Mt. Prospect, Illinois
G	52	Cam Marotta (W)	5 ft 10 in (1.78 m)	175 lb (79 kg)	Jr	Homestead High School (WI)	Mequon, Wisconsin

Head coach

- Steve Wojciechowski (Duke)

Assistant coach(es)

- Chris Carrawell (Duke)
- Brett Nelson (Florida)
- Stan Johnson (Southern Utah)

Legend

- (C) Team captain
- (S) Suspended
- (I) Ineligible
- (W) Walk-on
- Injured
- Current redshirt

Roster

== Schedule and results ==
Date time, TV	Rank^{#}	Opponent^{#}	Result	Record	Site (attendance) city, state
Exhibition
Nov 4, 2017*; 1:00 pm, SPEC		Lindenwood	W 81–79		BMO Harris Bradley Center (11,533); Milwaukee, WI
Non-conference regular season
Nov 10, 2017*; 8:00 pm, FSN		Mount St. Mary's; Maui Invitational Mainland game	W 80–59	1–0	BMO Harris Bradley Center (13,324); Milwaukee, WI
Nov 14, 2017*; 7:30 pm, FS1		No. 19 Purdue; Gavitt Tipoff Games	L 71–86	1–1	BMO Harris Bradley Center (13,307); Milwaukee, WI
Nov 20, 2017*; 1:30 pm, ESPN2		vs. VCU; Maui Invitational quarterfinals	W 94–83	2–1	Lahaina Civic Center (2,400); Lahaina, HI
Nov 21, 2017*; 12:30 pm, ESPN		vs. No. 6 Wichita State; Maui Invitational semifinals	L 66–80	2–2	Lahaina Civic Center (2,400); Lahaina, HI
Nov 22, 2017*; 7:00 pm, ESPN2		vs. LSU; Maui Invitational	W 94–84	3–2	Lahaina Civic Center (2,400); Lahaina, HI
Nov 27, 2017*; 7:00 pm, FS1		Eastern Illinois	W 86–83	4–2	BMO Harris Bradley Center (11,647); Milwaukee, WI
Nov 29, 2017*; 8:00 pm, FS2		Chicago State	W 95–69	5–2	BMO Harris Bradley Center (11,685); Milwaukee, WI
Dec 2, 2017*; 1:00 pm, CBSSN		Georgia	L 66–73	5–3	BMO Harris Bradley Center (13,476); Milwaukee, WI
Dec 5, 2017*; 6:00 pm, FS1		Vermont	W 91–81	6–3	BMO Harris Bradley Center (12,055); Milwaukee, WI
Dec 9, 2017*; 11:00 am, FS1		at Wisconsin; Rivalry	W 82–63	7–3	Kohl Center (17,287); Madison, WI
Dec 18, 2017*; 6:00 pm, FS1		Northern Illinois	W 79–70	8–3	BMO Harris Bradley Center (12,532); Milwaukee, WI
Dec 21, 2017*; 6:00 pm, FS1		American	W 92–51	9–3	BMO Harris Bradley Center (12,683); Milwaukee, WI
Big East regular season
Dec 27, 2017; 7:30 pm, FS1		No. 6 Xavier	L 87–91	9–4 (0–1)	BMO Harris Bradley Center (15,095); Milwaukee, WI
Dec 30, 2017; 3:30 pm, FS1		Georgetown	W 74–65	10–4 (1–1)	BMO Harris Bradley Center (14,889); Milwaukee, WI
Jan 3, 2018; 5:30 pm, CBSSN		at Providence	W 95–90 ^{OT}	11–4 (2–1)	Dunkin' Donuts Center (8,375); Providence, RI
Jan 6, 2018; 7:00 pm, FS1		at No. 3 Villanova	L 90–100	11–5 (2–2)	Wells Fargo Center (14,210); Philadelphia, PA
Jan 9, 2018; 8:00 pm, CBSSN		No. 13 Seton Hall	W 84–64	12–5 (3–2)	BMO Harris Bradley Center (12,901); Milwaukee, WI
Jan 12, 2018; 5:30 pm, FS1		at Butler	L 83–94	12–6 (3–3)	Hinkle Fieldhouse (8,911); Indianapolis, IN
Jan 15, 2018; 8:00 pm, FS1		DePaul	W 70–52	13–6 (4–3)	BMO Harris Bradley Center (12,278); Milwaukee, WI
Jan 24, 2018; 5:30 pm, FS1		at No. 8 Xavier	L 70–89	13–7 (4–4)	Cintas Center (10,493); Cincinnati, OH
Jan 28, 2018; 12:00 pm, FOX		No. 1 Villanova	L 82–85	13–8 (4–5)	BMO Harris Bradley Center (17,120); Milwaukee, WI
Jan 31, 2018; 8:00 pm, FS1		Butler	L 72–92	13–9 (4–6)	BMO Harris Bradley Center (12,779); Milwaukee, WI
Feb 3, 2018; 1:30 pm, FS1		Providence	L 75–77	13–10 (4–7)	BMO Harris Bradley Center (18,958); Milwaukee, WI
Feb 7, 2018; 6:00 pm, FS1		at Seton Hall	W 88–85	14–10 (5–7)	Prudential Center (8,210); Newark, NJ
Feb 10, 2018; 11:00 am, FSN		at St. John's	L 78–86	14–11 (5–8)	Carnesecca Arena (5,602); Queens, NY
Feb 17, 2018; 9:00 pm, FSN		at Creighton	W 90–86	15–11 (6–8)	CenturyLink Center (18,495); Omaha, NE
Feb 21, 2018; 7:30 pm, FSN		St. John's	W 85–73	16–11 (7–8)	BMO Harris Bradley Center (12,624); Milwaukee, WI
Feb 24, 2018; 11:00 am, FSN		at DePaul	L 62–70	16–12 (7–9)	Wintrust Arena (9,053); Chicago, IL
Feb 26, 2017; 6:00 pm, FS1		at Georgetown	W 90–86 ^{OT}	17–12 (8–9)	Capital One Arena (5,375); Washington, D.C.
Mar 3, 2018; 2:30 pm, FS1		Creighton	W 85–81	18–12 (9–9)	BMO Harris Bradley Center (18,221); Milwaukee, WI
Big East tournament
Mar 7, 2018; 8:30 pm, FS1	(7)	vs. (10) DePaul; First Round	W 72–69	19–12	Madison Square Garden (16,866); New York, NY
Mar 8, 2018; 8:30 pm, FS1	(7)	vs. (2) No. 2 Villanova; Quarterfinals	L 70–94	19–13	Madison Square Garden (19,812); New York, NY
NIT
Mar 14, 2018*; 6:00 pm, ESPN2	(2)	(7) Harvard; First Round – Notre Dame Bracket	W 67–60	20–13	Al McGuire Center (3,607); Milwaukee, WI
Mar 18, 2018*; 3:30 pm, ESPN2	(2)	(3) Oregon; Second Round – Notre Dame Bracket	W 101–92	21–13	Al McGuire Center (3,618); Milwaukee, WI
Mar 20, 2018*; 6:00 pm, ESPN	(2)	(4) Penn State; Quarterfinals – Notre Dame Bracket	L 80–85	21–14	Al McGuire Center (3,670); Milwaukee, WI
*Non-conference game. ^{#}Rankings from AP Poll. (#) Tournament seedings in parentheses. All times are in Central Time.
