= 2017–18 DePaul Blue Demons men's basketball team =

American college basketball season

2017–18 DePaul Blue Demons men's basketball
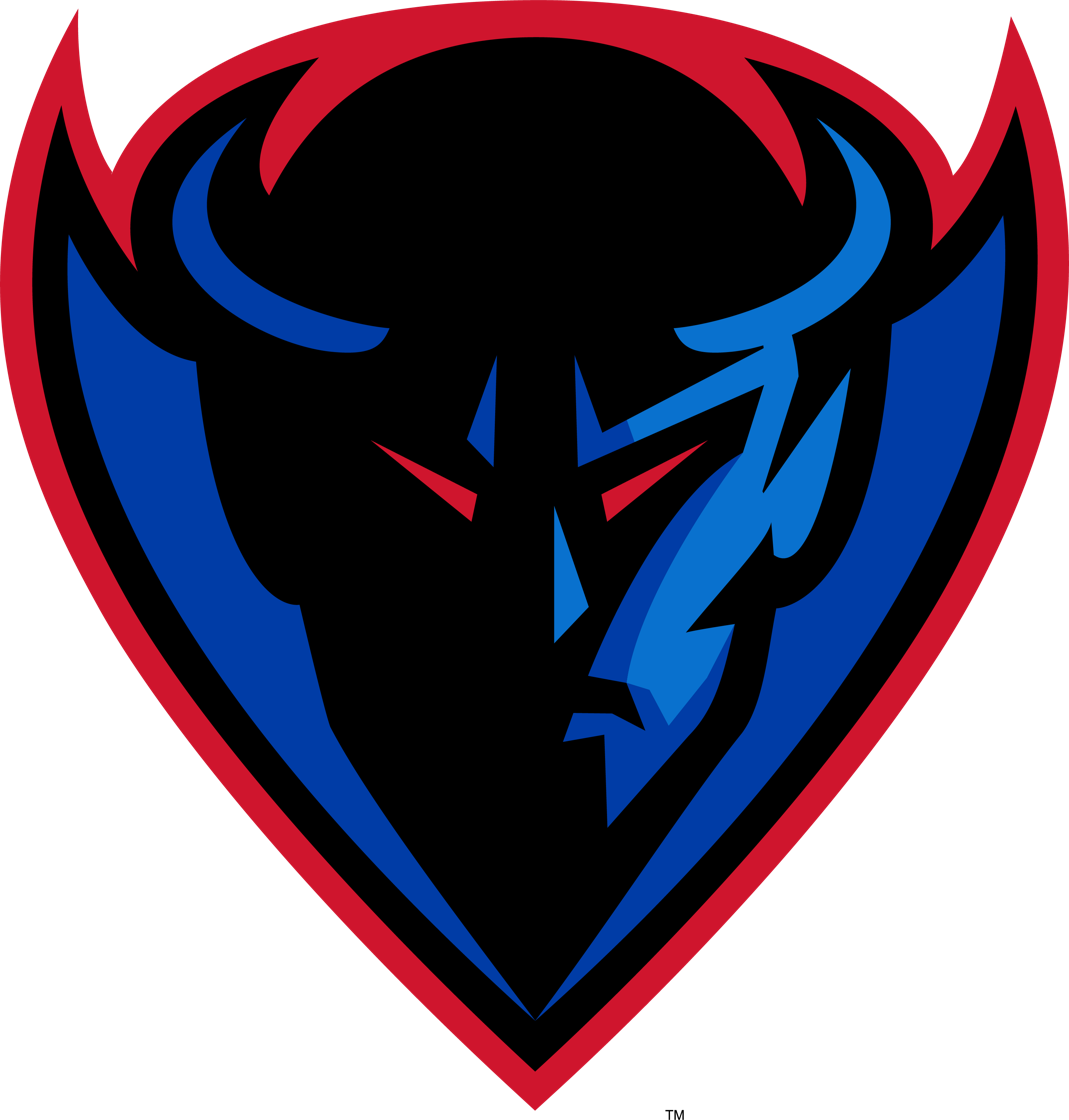
- Conference: Big East Conference
- Record: 11–20 (4–14 Big East)
- Head coach: Dave Leitao (3rd straight, 6th overall season)
- Assistant coaches: Tim Anderson; Bill Courtney; Shane Heirman
- Home arena: Wintrust Arena

2017–18 Big East men's basketball standings
	Conf.				Overall
Team	W		L	PCT	W		L	PCT
No. 3 Xavier	15	–	3	.833	29	–	6	.829
No. 2 Villanova †	14	–	4	.778	36	–	4	.900
Seton Hall	10	–	8	.556	22	–	12	.647
Creighton	10	–	8	.556	21	–	12	.636
Providence	10	–	8	.556	21	–	14	.600
Butler	9	–	9	.500	21	–	14	.600
Marquette	9	–	9	.500	21	–	14	.600
Georgetown	5	–	13	.278	15	–	15	.500
St. John's	4	–	14	.222	16	–	17	.485
DePaul	4	–	14	.222	11	–	20	.355
† 2018 Big East tournament winner Rankings from AP poll

The 2017–18 DePaul Blue Demons men's basketball team represented DePaul University during the 2017–18 NCAA Division I men's basketball season. They were led by third-year (sixth overall with DePaul) head coach Dave Leitao and played their home games at the new Wintrust Arena in Chicago, Illinois as members of the Big East Conference. They finished the season 11–20, 4–14 in Big East play to finish in a tie for ninth place. They lost in the first round of the Big East tournament to Marquette.

== Previous season ==
The Blue Demons finished the 2016–17 season 9–23, 2–16 in Big East play to finish in last place. They lost in the first round of the Big East tournament to Xavier. That season marked the Blue Demons' final season at Allstate Arena

== Offseason ==
=== Departures ===
Name	Number	Pos.	Height	Weight	Year	Hometown	Reason for departure
R. J. Curington	0	G	6'5"	199	Senior	Dyer, IN	Graduated
Darrick Wood	1	G	6'5"	178	Senior	Alexandria, VA	Graduated
Billy Garrett Jr.	5	G	6'6"	210	Senior	Chicago, IL	Graduated
Erten Gazi	12	G	6'4"	212	Sophomore	Northern Cyprus	Transferred to Fordham
Al Eichelberger	23	F	6'7"	251	Freshman	Saginaw, MI	Transferred to Cleveland State
David Leitao III	32	F	6'5'	220	Senior	Virginia Beach, VA	Walk-on; left the team for personal reasons
Levi Cook	44	C	6'10"	300	Freshman	Clarksburg, WV	Transferred to Marshall
Chris Harrison-Docks	51	G	5'10"	189	RS Senior	Okemos, MI	Graduated

=== Incoming transfers ===
Name	Number	Pos.	Height	Weight	Year	Hometown	Previous School
Jalen Coleman-Lands	5	G	6'3"	190	Junior	Indianapolis, IN	Transfer from Illinois. Under NCAA transfer rules, Coleman-Lands will have to sit out the 2017–18 season. Will have two years of remaining eligibility.
Marin Maric	34	C	6'11"	250	RS Senior	Split, Croatia	Transferred from Northern Illinois. Will be eligible to play immediately since Maric graduated from Northern Illinois.

=== 2017 recruiting class ===
College recruiting
Name	Hometown	School	Height	Weight	Commit date
Justin Roberts #32 PG	Indianapolis, IN	Pike High School	5 ft 10 in (1.78 m)	170 lb (77 kg)	Jun 13, 2016
Justin Roberts #32 PG	Recruit ratings: Scout: Rivals: 247Sports: ESPN:				
Jaylen Butz #58 PF	Fort Wayne, IN	North Side High School	6 ft 9 in (2.06 m)	225 lb (102 kg)	Oct 6, 2016
Jaylen Butz #58 PF	Recruit ratings: Scout: Rivals: 247Sports: ESPN:				
Paul Reed; SF	Apopka, FL	Wekiva High School	6 ft 8 in (2.03 m)	180 lb (82 kg)	Dec 4, 2016
Paul Reed; SF	Recruit ratings: Scout: Rivals: 247Sports: ESPN:				
Overall recruit ranking:
Note: In many cases, Scout, Rivals, 247Sports, On3, and ESPN may conflict in their listings of height and weight.; In these cases, the average was taken. ESPN grades are on a 100-point scale.; Sources: "2017 DePaul Signees". Rivals.; "2017 DePaul Signees". ESPN.; "2017 Team Ranking". Rivals.

=== 2018 recruiting class ===
College recruiting (2018)
Name	Hometown	School	Height	Weight	Commit date
John Diener; SG	Cedarburg, WI	Cedarburg High School	6 ft 4 in (1.93 m)	170 lb (77 kg)	May 4, 2016
John Diener; SG	Recruit ratings: Scout: Rivals: 247Sports: ESPN:				
Overall recruit ranking:
Note: In many cases, Scout, Rivals, 247Sports, On3, and ESPN may conflict in their listings of height and weight.; In these cases, the average was taken. ESPN grades are on a 100-point scale.; Sources: "2018 DePaul Signees". Rivals.; "2018 DePaul Signees". ESPN.; "2018 Team Ranking". Rivals.

== Preseason ==
The Blue Demons were picked to finish in last place in the preseason Big East poll.

== Roster ==
2017–18 DePaul Blue Demons men's basketball team
Players
Coaches

Pos.	#	Name	Height	Weight	Year	Previous school	Hometown
G	0	Justin Roberts	6 ft 0 in (1.83 m)	170 lb (77 kg)	Fr	Findlay Prep	Indianapolis, IN
G	1	Austin Grandstaff	6 ft 2 in (1.88 m)	185 lb (84 kg)	RS So	Rockwall; Ohio State	Rockwall, TX
F	2	Jaylen Butz	6 ft 9 in (2.06 m)	224 lb (102 kg)	Fr	North Side	Fort Wayne, IN
G	3	Devin Gage (injured)	6 ft 2 in (1.88 m)	195 lb (88 kg)	So	Curie	Chicago, IL
G	4	Brandon Cyrus	6 ft 5 in (1.96 m)	190 lb (86 kg)	So	La Lumiere School	Toronto, ON
G	5	Jalen Coleman-Lands (redshirt)	6 ft 3 in (1.91 m)	185 lb (84 kg)	Jr	La Lumiere School; Illinois	Indianapolis, IN
F	10	Tre'Darius McCallum	6 ft 7 in (2.01 m)	220 lb (100 kg)	Sr	St. James; Indian Hills CC	Myrtle Beach, SC
G	11	Eli Cain	6 ft 6 in (1.98 m)	200 lb (91 kg)	Jr	St. Benedict's Prep	Willingboro, NJ
G	12	Jason Malonga (W)	6 ft 4 in (1.93 m)	180 lb (82 kg)	Fr	Benet Academy	Bolingbrook, IL
G	13	James Anderson (W)	6 ft 1 in (1.85 m)	180 lb (82 kg)	Fr	La Lumiere	Melbourne, Australia
F	15	Paul Reed	6 ft 9 in (2.06 m)	210 lb (95 kg)	Fr	Wekiva	Orlando, FL
G	21	Pantelis Xidias (W)	5 ft 11 in (1.8 m)	155 lb (70 kg)	Fr	La Lumiere	Michigan City, IN
F	22	Tobias Dwimaah (W)	6 ft 5 in (1.96 m)	220 lb (100 kg)	Sr	DePaul Prep	Chicago, IL
F	30	Peter Ryckbosch	6 ft 10 in (2.08 m)	230 lb (104 kg)	RS Sr	St. Ignatius	Chicago, IL
G	31	Max Strus	6 ft 6 in (1.98 m)	205 lb (93 kg)	RS Jr	Amos Alonzo Stagg; Lewis University	Hickory Hills, IL
F	33	Joe Hanel (W)	6 ft 7 in (2.01 m)	218 lb (99 kg)	Sr	Holy Family Catholic	Savage, MN
C	34	Marin Maric	6 ft 11 in (2.11 m)	240 lb (109 kg)	RS Sr	La Lumiere School; Northern Illinois	Split, Croatia

Head coach

- Dave Leitao (Northeastern)

Assistant coach(es)

- Tim Anderson (Oklahoma Panhandle State)
- Bill Courtney (Bucknell)
- Shane Heirman (Tulsa)

Legend

- (C) Team captain
- (S) Suspended
- (I) Ineligible
- (W) Walk-on
- Injured
- Current redshirt

Roster

== Schedule and results ==
Date time, TV	Rank^{#}	Opponent^{#}	Result	Record	High points	High rebounds	High assists	Site (attendance) city, state
Exhibition
Nov 5, 2017*; 3:00 pm		IU Northwest	W 121–65	–	22 – Strus	11 – McCallum	6 – Cain	Wintrust Arena (4,751); Chicago, IL
Non-conference regular season
Nov 11, 2017*; 3:00 pm, FS1		No. 14 Notre Dame	L 58–72	0–1	14 – Tied	5 – McCallum	3 – Cain	Wintrust Arena (10,194); Chicago, IL
Nov 13, 2017*; 7:00 pm, FS2		Delaware State	W 81–57	1–1	17 – McCallum	13 – Butz	8 – Gage	Wintrust Arena (4,527); Chicago, IL
Nov 17, 2017*; 7:30 pm, BTN		at Illinois; Gavitt Tipoff Games	L 73–82	1–2	19 – Roberts	7 – Butz	5 – Roberts	State Farm Center (11,254); Champaign, IL
Nov 23, 2017*; 10:30 pm, ESPN		vs. No. 4 Michigan State; PK80–Phil Knight Invitational Quarterfinals	L 51–73	1–3	12 – Tied	4 – 3 tied	2 – 3 tied	Moda Center (13,439); Portland, OR
Nov 24, 2017*; 8:30 pm, ESPNU		vs. Oregon; PK80–Phil Knight Invitational Consolation 2nd round	L 79–89 ^{OT}	1–4	22 – Maric	9 – McCallum	4 – Cain	Veterans Memorial Coliseum (8,853); Portland, OR
Nov 26, 2017*; 6:00 pm, ESPNU		vs. Portland; PK80–Phil Knight Invitational 7th place game	W 82–69	2–4	21 – Strus	13 – Maric	6 – Gage	Veterans Memorial Coliseum (2,771); Portland, OR
Dec 2, 2017*; 1:00 pm, FSN		Youngstown State	W 89–73	3–4	20 – Strus	7 – Cain	4 – Strus	Wintrust Arena (4,732); Chicago, IL
Dec 6, 2017*; 8:00 pm, FS1		Central Connecticut	W 85–57	4–4	17 – Cain	9 – Butz	5 – Roberts	Wintrust Arena (4,458); Chicago, IL
Dec 9, 2017*; 3:00 pm, NBCS CHI		at UIC	W 65–55	5–4	24 – Strus	8 – Cain	8 – Cain	UIC Pavilion (3,229); Chicago, IL
Dec 11, 2017*; 8:00 pm, FS1		Alabama A&M	W 83–59	6–4	14 – Strus	6 – Reed	8 – Cain	Wintrust Arena (4,508); Chicago, IL
Dec 16, 2017*; 1:00 pm, FS1		Northwestern	L 60–62	6–5	33 – Strus	11 – McCallum	5 – Cyrus	Wintrust Arena (7,001); Chicago, IL
Dec 21, 2017*; 8:00 pm, FS1		Miami (OH)	W 83–66	7–5	22 – Maric	8 – McCallum	4 – Tied	Wintrust Arena (4,890); Chicago, IL
Big East Conference regular season
Dec 27, 2017; 6:30 pm, CBSSN		No. 1 Villanova	L 85–103	7–6 (0–1)	20 – Strus	10 – Maric	6 – 3 tied	Wintrust Arena (8,323); Chicago, IL
Dec 30, 2017; 1:00 pm, FS1		at No. 6 Xavier	L 72–77	7–7 (0–2)	33 – Strus	8 – McCallum	6 – Maric	Cintas Center (10,436); Cincinnati, OH
Jan 2, 2018; 8:15 pm, FS1		Georgetown	L 81–90	7–8 (0–3)	19 – Strus	7 – McCallum	10 – Cain	Wintrust Arena (5,190); Chicago, IL
Jan 6, 2018; 1:00 pm, FSN		at St. John's	W 91–74	8–8 (1–3)	25 – Maric	11 – Maric	5 – Maric	Carnesecca Arena (5,602); Queens, NY
Jan 12, 2018; 7:30 pm, FS1		Providence	L 64–71	8–9 (1–4)	15 – Maric	9 – Strus	4 – 3 tied	Wintrust Arena (5,354); Chicago, IL
Jan 15, 2018; 8:00 pm, FS1		at Marquette	L 52–70	8–10 (1–5)	15 – Cyrus	8 – Maric	4 – Strus	BMO Harris Bradley Center (12,278); Milwaukee, WI
Jan 20, 2018; 1:00 pm, FS1		Butler	L 67–79	8–11 (1–6)	27 – Strus	8 – McCallum	7 – Cain	Wintrust Arena (6,802); Chicago, IL
Jan 24, 2018; 7:45 pm, FS1		at Georgetown	W 74–73	9–11 (2–6)	27 – Cain	9 – Reed	4 – Strus	Capital One Arena (4,828); Washington, D.C.
Jan 28, 2018; 3:00 pm, CBSSN		Seton Hall	L 70–86	9–12 (2–7)	16 – McCallum	8 – Strus	6 – Cain	Wintrust Arena (5,650); Chicago, IL
Feb 3, 2018; 11:00 am, FS1		at Butler	L 57–80	9–13 (2–8)	15 – Maric	7 – McCallum	4 – Roberts	Hinkle Fieldhouse (8,879); Indianapolis, IN
Feb 7, 2018; 8:00 pm, FS1		Creighton	L 75–76	9–14 (2–9)	23 – Maric	11 – Reed	6 – Cain	Wintrust Arena (5,010); Chicago, IL
Feb 10, 2018; 3:30 pm, FSN		at Providence	W 80–63	10–14 (3–9)	18 – Maric	10 – McCallum	5 – Cain	Dunkin' Donuts Center (12,892); Providence, RI
Feb 14, 2018; 8:00 pm, CBSSN		St. John's	L 76–77	10–15 (3–10)	19 – Cain	9 – Maric	11 – Cain	Wintrust Arena (4,690); Chicago, IL
Feb 18, 2018; 3:00 pm, FS1		at Seton Hall	L 77–82	10–16 (3–11)	23 – Maric	8 – Maric	5 – Cain	Prudential Center (10,110); Newark, NJ
Feb 21, 2018; 7:30 pm, FS1		at No. 3 Villanova	L 62–93	10–17 (3–12)	21 – Strus	8 – Reed	8 – Cain	Wells Fargo Center (10,007); Philadelphia, PA
Feb 24, 2018; 11:00 am, FSN		Marquette	W 70–62	11–17 (4–12)	20 – Strus	13 – Maric	3 – 3 tied	Wintrust Arena (9,053); Chicago, IL
Feb 27, 2018; 8:00 pm, FS1		at Creighton	L 57–82	11–18 (4–13)	14 – Strus	7 – Maric	6 – Strus	CenturyLink Center Omaha (18,191); Omaha, NE
Mar 3, 2018; 11:00 am, FOX		No. 3 Xavier	L 62–65	11–19 (4–14)	20 – Cyrus	5 – 3 tied	4 – Cain	Wintrust Arena (7,972); Chicago, IL
Big East tournament
Mar 7, 2018; 8:30 pm, FS1	(10)	vs. (7) Marquette; First round	L 69–72	11–20	22 – 2 tied	10 – Maric	10 – Cain	Madison Square Garden (16,866); New York City, NY
*Non-conference game. ^{#}Rankings from AP Poll. (#) Tournament seedings in parentheses. All times are in Central Time.
