= 2017–18 Creighton Bluejays men's basketball team =

American college basketball season

2017–18 Creighton Bluejays men's basketball

NCAA tournament, First Round
- Conference: Big East Conference
- Record: 21–12 (10–8 Big East)
- Head coach: Greg McDermott (8th season)
- Assistant coaches: Darian DeVries (20th season); Preston Murphy (3rd season); Alan Huss (1st season)
- Home arena: CenturyLink Center Omaha

2017–18 Big East men's basketball standings
	Conf.				Overall
Team	W		L	PCT	W		L	PCT
No. 3 Xavier	15	–	3	.833	29	–	6	.829
No. 2 Villanova †	14	–	4	.778	36	–	4	.900
Seton Hall	10	–	8	.556	22	–	12	.647
Creighton	10	–	8	.556	21	–	12	.636
Providence	10	–	8	.556	21	–	14	.600
Butler	9	–	9	.500	21	–	14	.600
Marquette	9	–	9	.500	21	–	14	.600
Georgetown	5	–	13	.278	15	–	15	.500
St. John's	4	–	14	.222	16	–	17	.485
DePaul	4	–	14	.222	11	–	20	.355
† 2018 Big East tournament winner Rankings from AP poll

The 2017–18 Creighton Bluejays men's basketball team represented Creighton University in the 2017–18 NCAA Division I men's basketball season. The Bluejays were led by eighth-year head coach Greg McDermott and played their home games at the CenturyLink Center Omaha, as members of the Big East Conference. They finished the season 21–12, 10–8 in Big East play to finish in a three-way tie for third place. They lost in the quarterfinals of the Big East tournament to Providence. They received an at-large bid to the NCAA tournament as the No. 8 seed in the South Region. There the Bluejays lost in the first round to Kansas State.

== Previous season ==
The Bluejays finished the 2016–17 season 25–10, 10–8 in Big East play to finish in a four-way tie for third place. In the Big East tournament, they defeated Providence and Xavier before losing to Villanova in the championship game. They received an at-large bid to the NCAA tournament as a No. 6 seed in the Midwest region. There they lost in the first round to No. 11-seeded Rhode Island.

== Offseason ==
=== Departures ===
Name	Number	Pos.	Height	Weight	Year	Hometown	Notes
Maurice Watson	10	G	5'10"	175	Senior	Philadelphia, PA	Graduated
Cole Huff	13	F	6'8"	220	Senior	Altadena, CA	Graduated
Isaiah Zierden	21	G	6'3"	190	RS Senior	St. Louis Park, MN	Graduated
Justin Patton	23	C	7'0"	230	RS Freshman	Omaha, NE	Declared for the 2017 NBA draft; selected 16th overall by the Chicago Bulls.
Kobe Paras	24	G	6'6"	200	Freshman	Quezon City, Philippines	Transferred to Cal State Northridge
Sam Dunkum	31	F	6'10"	215	Sophomore	North Little Rock, AR	Walk-on; transferred to East Mississippi CC

=== Incoming transfers ===
Name	Number	Pos.	Height	Weight	Year	Hometown	Notes
Damien Jefferson	23	G/F	6'5"	190	Sophomore	East Chicago, IN	Transferred from New Mexico. Under NCAA transfer rules, Jefferson will have to sit out for the 2017–18 season. Will have three years of remaining eligibility.
Manny Suarez	44	C	6'10"	250	RS Senior	Cliffside Park, NJ	Transferred from Adelphi. Will be eligible to play immediately since Suarez graduated from Adelphi.

=== 2017 recruiting class ===
College recruiting information
Name	Hometown	School	Height	Weight	Commit date
Ty-Shon Alexander; SG	Charlotte, NC	Oak Hill Academy (VA)	6 ft 4 in (1.93 m)	190 lb (86 kg)	Oct 31, 2015
Ty-Shon Alexander; SG	Recruit ratings: Scout: Rivals: 247Sports: ESPN: (84)				
Jacob Epperson; C	Maribyrnong, Victoria, Australia	La Lumiere School	6 ft 11 in (2.11 m)	190 lb (86 kg)	Mar 16, 2017
Jacob Epperson; C	Recruit ratings: Scout: Rivals: 247Sports: ESPN: (83)				
Mitch Ballock; SG	Eudora, KS	Eudora	6 ft 5 in (1.96 m)	185 lb (84 kg)	Feb 7, 2016
Mitch Ballock; SG	Recruit ratings: Scout: Rivals: 247Sports: ESPN: (82)				
Overall recruit ranking:
Note: In many cases, Scout, Rivals, 247Sports, On3, and ESPN may conflict in their listings of height and weight.; In these cases, the average was taken. ESPN grades are on a 100-point scale.; Sources: "2017 Team Ranking". Rivals.

=== 2018 Recruiting class ===
College recruiting information (2018)
Name	Hometown	School	Height	Weight	Commit date
Marcus Zegarowski; PG	Hamilton, MA	Tilton School	6 ft 1 in (1.85 m)	164 lb (74 kg)	Sep 4, 2017
Marcus Zegarowski; PG	Recruit ratings: Scout: Rivals: 247Sports: ESPN:				
Christian Bishop; SF	Lee's Summit, MO	Lee's Summit West High School	6 ft 7 in (2.01 m)	180 lb (82 kg)	Jun 22, 2017
Christian Bishop; SF	Recruit ratings: Scout: Rivals: 247Sports: ESPN:				
Sam Froling; PF	Canberra, SW	Australian Institute of Sport	6 ft 9 in (2.06 m)	205 lb (93 kg)	Jan 15, 2018
Sam Froling; PF	Recruit ratings: Scout: Rivals: 247Sports: ESPN:				
Overall recruit ranking:
Note: In many cases, Scout, Rivals, 247Sports, On3, and ESPN may conflict in their listings of height and weight.; In these cases, the average was taken. ESPN grades are on a 100-point scale.; Sources: "2018 Team Ranking". Rivals.

== Preseason ==
In a poll of Big East coaches at the conference media day, Creighton was picked to finish in fifth place. Junior guard Khyri Thomas was a preseason All-Big East Honorable Mention.

== Roster ==
2017–18 Creighton Bluejays men's basketball team
Players
Coaches

Pos.	#	Name	Height	Weight	Year	Previous school	Hometown
G	0	Marcus Foster	6 ft 3 in (1.91 m)	205 lb (93 kg)	RS Sr	Hirschi HS; Kansas State	Wichita Falls, TX
G	1	Davion Mintz	6 ft 3 in (1.91 m)	180 lb (82 kg)	So	North Mecklenburg HS	Charlotte, NC
G	2	Khyri Thomas	6 ft 3 in (1.91 m)	210 lb (95 kg)	Jr	Fork Union	Omaha, NE
G/F	4	Ronnie Harrell	6 ft 7 in (2.01 m)	200 lb (91 kg)	RS Jr	East HS	Denver, CO
G	5	Ty-Shon Alexander	6 ft 4 in (1.93 m)	195 lb (88 kg)	Fr	Oak Hill Academy (VA)	Charlotte, NC
G	11	Tyler Clement (W)	6 ft 2 in (1.88 m)	185 lb (84 kg)	Sr	St. Thomas Aquinas HS	Overland Park, KS
G	12	Jordan Scurry (W)	6 ft 2 in (1.88 m)	205 lb (93 kg)	So	St. Mark's	Chestnut Hill, MA
G	14	Kaleb Joseph	6 ft 3 in (1.91 m)	180 lb (82 kg)	RS Jr	Cushing Academy; Syracuse	Nashua, NH
F	15	Martin Krampelj	6 ft 9 in (2.06 m)	220 lb (100 kg)	RS So	Impact Academy	Grosuplje, Slovenia
G/F	23	Damien Jefferson (redshirt)	6 ft 5 in (1.96 m)	195 lb (88 kg)	So	Central HS; New Mexico	East Chicago, IN
G	24	Mitch Ballock	6 ft 5 in (1.96 m)	205 lb (93 kg)	Fr	Eudora HS	Eudora, KS
F	32	Toby Hegner	6 ft 10 in (2.08 m)	240 lb (109 kg)	RS Sr	Berlin HS	Berlin, WI
C	41	Jacob Epperson	6 ft 11 in (2.11 m)	210 lb (95 kg)	Fr	La Lumiere (IN)	Melbourne, Australia
C	44	Manny Suarez	6 ft 10 in (2.08 m)	250 lb (113 kg)	RS Sr	Marist HS; Adelphi	Cliffside Park, NJ

Head coach

- Greg McDermott (Northern Iowa)

Assistant coach(es)

- Darian DeVries (Northern Iowa)
- Preston Murphy (Rhode Island)
- Alan Huss (Creighton)

Legend

- (C) Team captain
- (S) Suspended
- (I) Ineligible
- (W) Walk-on
- Injured
- Current redshirt

Roster

== Schedule and results ==
Date time, TV	Rank^{#}	Opponent^{#}	Result	Record	High points	High rebounds	High assists	Site (attendance) city, state
Exhibition
Oct 26, 2017*; 7:00 pm		Omaha; ARC hurricane relief charity game	W 96–67	–	22 – Foster	13 – Harrell	3 – 3 tied	CenturyLink Center (8,280); Omaha, NE
Nov 3, 2017*; 7:00 pm		UNC Pembroke	W 93–70	–	23 – Thomas	13 – Suarez	3 – Tied	CenturyLink Center (15,535); Omaha, NE
Regular season
Nov 10, 2017*; 8:00 pm, FSN		Yale; CBE Hall of Fame Classic campus-site game	W 92–76	1–0	23 – Foster	9 – Krampelj	5 – Tied	CenturyLink Center (16,611); Omaha, NE
Nov 12, 2017*; 6:00 pm, FS1		Alcorn State; CBE Hall of Fame Classic campus-site game	W 109–72	2–0	23 – Foster	12 – Krampelj	3 – Tied	CenturyLink Center (14,730); Omaha, NE
Nov 15, 2017*; 8:00 pm, BTN		at No. 20 Northwestern; Gavitt Tipoff Games	W 92–88	3–0	24 – Thomas	11 – Thomas	5 – Thomas	Allstate Arena (6,384); Rosemont, IL
Nov 20, 2017*; 6:00 pm, ESPNU		vs. No. 23 UCLA; CBE Hall of Fame Classic semifinals	W 100–89	4–0	23 – Foster	15 – Harrell, Jr.	3 – 3 tied	Sprint Center (10,234); Kansas City, MO
Nov 21, 2017*; 9:00 pm, ESPN2		vs. No. 22 Baylor; CBE Hall of Fame Classic championship	L 59–65	4–1	15 – Thomas	6 – Krampelj	4 – Foster	Sprint Center (10,160); Kansas City, MO
Nov 25, 2017*; 3:30 pm, FS2		SIU Edwardsville	W 103–66	5–1	20 – Krampelj	8 – Harrell, Jr.	6 – Ballock	CenturyLink Center (15,607); Omaha, NE
Dec 1, 2017*; 9:15 pm, ESPN2	No. 25	at No. 15 Gonzaga	L 74–91	5–2	21 – Foster	8 – Harrell Jr.	6 – Mintz	McCarthey Athletic Center (6,000); Spokane, WA
Dec 5, 2017*; 7:00 pm, FS2		North Dakota	W 111–68	6–2	23 – Foster	14 – Krampelj	6 – Ballock	CenturyLink Center (15,069); Omaha, NE
Dec 9, 2017*; 1:30 pm, FS1		Nebraska; Rivlary	W 75–65	7–2	19 – Foster	11 – Tied	4 – Ballock	CenturyLink Center (17,901); Omaha, NE
Dec 15, 2017*; 7:00 pm, FS1		Maryland Eastern Shore	W 87–36	8–2	15 – Foster	10 – Harrell Jr.	4 – Tied	CenturyLink Center (16,520); Omaha, NE
Dec 18, 2017*; 8:00 pm, FS1	No. 25	Texas–Arlington	W 90–81	9–2	32 – Foster	11 – Krampelj	5 – Thomas	CenturyLink Center (15,564); Omaha, NE
Dec 20, 2017*; 8:00 pm, FS1	No. 25	USC Upstate	W 116–62	10–2	16 – Foster	9 – Sauarez	8 – Joseph	CenturyLink Center (15,366); Omaha, NE
Dec 28, 2017; 5:30 pm, FS1	No. 25	at No. 23 Seton Hall	L 84–90	10–3 (0–1)	23 – Krampelj	10 – Tied	6 – Thomas	Prudential Center; Newark, NJ
Dec 31, 2017; 1:30 pm, FS1	No. 25	Providence	W 83–64	11–3 (1–1)	18 – Foster	8 – Krampelj	4 – Tied	CenturyLink Center (17,768); Omaha, NE
Jan 3, 2018; 7:00 pm, FS1		St. John's	W 78–71	12–3 (2–1)	25 – Foster	11 – Krampelj	5 – Tied	CenturyLink Center (16,167); Omaha, NE
Jan 6, 2018; 11:00 am, FSN/MASN2		at Georgetown	W 90–66	13–3 (3–1)	19 – Hegner	11 – Krampelj	6 – Mintz	Capital One Arena (7,538); Washington, D.C.
Jan 9, 2018; 7:30 pm, FS1	No. 25	Butler	W 85–74	14–3 (4–1)	23 – Foster	14 – Krampelj	8 – Foster	CenturyLink Center (17,229); Omaha, NE
Jan 13, 2018; 1:00 pm, FOX	No. 25	at No. 10 Xavier	L 70–92	14–4 (4–2)	16 – Tied	6 – Harrell Jr.	3 – Thomas	Cintas Center (10,655); Cincinnati, OH
Jan 17, 2018; 7:45 pm, FS1		No. 19 Seton Hall	W 80–63	15–4 (5–2)	25 – Foster	6 – Mintz	7 – Mintz	CenturyLink Center (17,705); Omaha, NE
Jan 20, 2018; 2:00 pm, CBSSN		at Providence	L 71–85	15–5 (5–3)	22 – Foster	8 – Harrell Jr.	8 – Harrell Jr.	Dunkin' Donuts Center (12,927); Providence, RI
Jan 23, 208; 7:30 pm, FS1		at St. John's	W 68–63	16–5 (6–3)	24 – Foster	8 – Foster	3 – Thomas	Carnesecca Arena (4,771); Queens, NY
Jan 27, 2018; 7:10 pm, CBSSN		Georgetown	W 85–77	17–5 (7–3)	28 – Foster	6 – Foster	3 – Tied	CenturyLink Center (18,518); Omaha, NE
Feb 1, 2018; 5:30 pm, FS1		at No. 1 Villanova	L 78–98	17–6 (7–4)	20 – Foster	4 – Tied	7 – Mintz	Wells Fargo Center (10,225); Philadelphia, PA
Feb 7, 2018; 8:00 pm, FS1		at DePaul	W 76–75	18–6 (8–4)	29 – Foster	8 – Harrell Jr.	5 – Harrell Jr.	Wintrust Arena (5,010); Chicago, IL
Feb 10, 2018; 1:30 pm, FOX		No. 5 Xavier	L 71–72	18–7 (8–5)	29 – Foster	8 – Foster	4 – Thomas	CenturyLink Center (18,257); Omaha, NE
Feb 13, 2018*; 7:00 pm, FS2		Bemidji State	W 94–46	19–7	15 – Epperson	8 – Tied	5 – Tied	CenturyLink Center (17,981); Omaha, NE
Feb 17, 2018; 9:00 pm, FSN		Marquette	L 86–90	19–8 (8–6)	26 – Thomas	6 – Harrell Jr.	6 – Harrell Jr.	CenturyLink Center (18,495); Omaha, NE
Feb 20, 2018; 6:00 pm, FS1		at Butler	L 70–93	19–9 (8–7)	15 – Ballock	7 – Harrell Jr.	3 – Tied	Hinkle Fieldhouse (8,630); Indianapolis, IN
Feb 24, 2018; 1:20 pm, FOX		No. 3 Villanova	W 89–83	20–9 (9–7)	28 – Foster	9 – Mintz	8 – Ballock	CenturyLink Center (18,321); Omaha, NE
Feb 27, 2018; 8:00 pm, FS1		DePaul	W 82–51	21–9 (10–7)	20 – Foster	8 – Thomas	8 – Thomas	CenturyLink Center (18,191); Omaha, NE
Mar 3, 2018; 1:30 pm, FS1		at Marquette	L 81–85	21–10 (10–8)	29 – Foster	9 – Thomas	6 – Mintz	BMO Harris Bradley Center (18,221); Milwaukee, WI
Big East tournament
Mar 8, 2018; 1:30 pm, FS1	(4)	vs. (5) Providence; Quarterfinals	L 68–72 ^{OT}	21–11	19 – Foster	7 – Tied	6 – Mintz	Madison Square Garden (17,647); New York, NY
NCAA tournament
Mar 16, 2018; 5:50 pm, TNT	(8 S)	vs. (9 S) Kansas State; First Round	L 59–69	21–12	16 – Ballock	8 – Ballock	4 – Thomas	Spectrum Center (17,943); Charlotte, NC
*Non-conference game. ^{#}Rankings from AP Poll. (#) Tournament seedings in parentheses. S=South. All times are in Central Time.

== Rankings ==
Ranking movements Legend: ██ Increase in ranking ██ Decrease in ranking — = Not ranked RV = Received votes
	Week																			
Poll	Pre	1	2	3	4	5	6	7	8	9	10	11	12	13	14	15	16	17	18	Final
AP	—	—	RV	25	RV	RV	25	25	RV	25	RV	RV	RV	RV	RV	RV	RV			Not released
Coaches	RV	RV^	RV	23	RV	25	24	23	24	22	RV	RV	RV	RV	25	RV	24			RV

^Coaches did not release a Week 2 poll.
*AP does not release post-NCAA tournament rankings
