= 2017–18 Butler Bulldogs men's basketball team =

American college basketball season

2017–18 Butler Bulldogs men's basketball

NCAA tournament, Second Round
- Conference: Big East Conference
- Record: 21–14 (9–9 Big East)
- Head coach: LaVall Jordan (1st season)
- Assistant coaches: Jeff Meyer (4th season); Emerson Kampen (2nd season); Omar Lowery (1st season)
- Home arena: Hinkle Fieldhouse

2017–18 Big East men's basketball standings
	Conf.				Overall
Team	W		L	PCT	W		L	PCT
No. 3 Xavier	15	–	3	.833	29	–	6	.829
No. 2 Villanova †	14	–	4	.778	36	–	4	.900
Seton Hall	10	–	8	.556	22	–	12	.647
Creighton	10	–	8	.556	21	–	12	.636
Providence	10	–	8	.556	21	–	14	.600
Butler	9	–	9	.500	21	–	14	.600
Marquette	9	–	9	.500	21	–	14	.600
Georgetown	5	–	13	.278	15	–	15	.500
St. John's	4	–	14	.222	16	–	17	.485
DePaul	4	–	14	.222	11	–	20	.355
† 2018 Big East tournament winner Rankings from AP poll

The 2017–18 Butler Bulldogs men's basketball team represented Butler University in the 2017–18 NCAA Division I men's basketball season. They were coached by LaVall Jordan, in his first year as head coach of his alma mater. The Bulldogs played their home games at Hinkle Fieldhouse in Indianapolis, Indiana as members of the Big East Conference. They finished the season 21–14, 9–9 in Big East play to finish a tie for sixth place. As the No. 6 seed in the Big East tournament, they defeated Seton Hall before losing to Villanova in the semifinals. They received an at-large bid to the NCAA tournament as the No. 10 seed in the Midwest region. There they defeated Arkansas in the first round before losing to Purdue in the second round.

== Previous season ==
The Bulldogs finished the 2016–17 season 25–9, 12–6 in Big East play to finish in second place. They lost to Xavier in the quarterfinals of the Big East tournament. The team received an at-large bid to the NCAA tournament as a No. 4 seed in the South Region. They defeated No. 13 Winthrop and No. 12 Middle Tennessee to advance to the Sweet 16. In the Sweet 16, they lost to eventual National Champion North Carolina.

On June 9, 2017, head coach Chris Holtmann left the school to become the head coach at Ohio State. On June 12, the school hired Milwaukee head coach and Butler alum LaVall Jordan as head coach.

== Off season ==
=== Departures ===
Name	Number	Pos.	Height	Weight	Year	Hometown	Notes
Steven Bennett	25	G	6'3"	190	Senior	New Castle, IN	Graduated
Andrew Chrabascz	45	F	6'7"	230	Senior	Portsmouth, RI	Graduated
Tyler Lewis	1	G	5'11"	170	RS Senior	Statesville, NC	Graduated
Trey Pettus	10	G	6'4"	200	Senior	St. Louis, MO	Graduated
Kethan Savage	11	G	6'3"	205	RS Senior	Alexandria, VA	Graduated
Avery Woodson	0	G	6'2"	190	Senior	Waynesboro, MS	Graduated

=== 2017 recruiting class ===
Butler originally signed five recruits in its 2017 class which was hailed as the best recruiting class in Butler history. Following Chris Holtmann's departure, however, top-rated recruited Kyle Young was released from his letter of intent and followed Holtmann to Ohio State. On October 8, 2017, Cooper Neese announced he would be transferring to Indiana State before the season began.

College recruiting information
Name	Hometown	School	Height	Weight	Commit date
Jerald Gillens-Butler; Point Guard	Fort Lauderdale, FL	Calvary Christian Academy	6 ft 4 in (1.93 m)	210 lb (95 kg)	Dec 8, 2015
Jerald Gillens-Butler; Point Guard	Recruit ratings: Scout: Rivals: 247Sports: ESPN: (80)				
Christian David; Shooting guard	Milton, ON	Vermont Academy	6 ft 5 in (1.96 m)	185 lb (84 kg)	Sep 24, 2016
Christian David; Shooting guard	Recruit ratings: Scout: Rivals: 247Sports: ESPN: (83)				
Aaron Thompson; Point Guard	Glenn Dale, MD	Paul VI Catholic High School	6 ft 3 in (1.91 m)	175 lb (79 kg)	May 2, 2017
Aaron Thompson; Point Guard	Recruit ratings: Scout: Rivals: 247Sports: ESPN: (81)				
Overall recruit ranking:
Note: In many cases, Scout, Rivals, 247Sports, On3, and ESPN may conflict in their listings of height and weight.; In these cases, the average was taken. ESPN grades are on a 100-point scale.; Sources: "2017 Team Ranking". Rivals.

== Preseason ==
In a poll of Big East coaches at the conference's media day, the Bulldogs were picked to finish in eight place in the Big East. Senior forward Kelan Martin was named to the preseason All-Big East First Team.

== Roster ==
2017–18 Butler Bulldogs men's basketball team
Players
Coaches

Pos.	#	Name	Height	Weight	Year	Previous school	Hometown
F	30	Kelan Martin	6 ft 7 in (2.01 m)	220 lb (100 kg)	Sr	Ballard	Louisville, KY
F	4	Tyler Wideman	6 ft 8 in (2.03 m)	240 lb (109 kg)	Sr	Lake Central	Merrillville, IN
C	51	Nate Fowler	6 ft 10 in (2.08 m)	240 lb (109 kg)	Jr	Archbishop Moeller	Cincinnati, OH
G	5	Paul Jorgensen	6 ft 2 in (1.88 m)	185 lb (84 kg)	RS Jr	Don Bosco Prep (George Washington)	New City, NY
G/F	20	Henry Baddley	6 ft 4 in (1.93 m)	175 lb (79 kg)	So	St. Vincent–St. Mary	Wadsworth, OH
G	3	Kamar Baldwin	6 ft 1 in (1.85 m)	170 lb (77 kg)	So	Apalachee	Winder, GA
F/C	50	Joey Brunk	6 ft 11 in (2.11 m)	240 lb (109 kg)	RS Fr	Southport	Indianapolis, IN
G	22	Sean McDermott	6 ft 6 in (1.98 m)	190 lb (86 kg)	RS So	Pendleton Heights	Pendleton, IN
G/F	25	Christian David	6 ft 6 in (1.98 m)	215 lb (98 kg)	Fr	Vermont Academy	Milton, Ontario
G	0	Campbell Donovan (W)	5 ft 11 in (1.8 m)	165 lb (75 kg)	Fr	Bishop Dwenger	Fort Wayne, IN
G/F	21	Jerald Gillens-Butler	6 ft 4 in (1.93 m)	235 lb (107 kg)	Fr	Calvary Christian Academy	Fort Lauderdale, FL
G	2	Aaron Thompson	6 ft 2 in (1.88 m)	190 lb (86 kg)	Fr	Paul VI Catholic	Glenn Dale, MD

Head coach

- LaVall Jordan (Butler)

Assistant coach(es)

- Jeff Meyer (Taylor)
- Emerson Kampen (Butler)
- Omar Lowery (Concordia (WI))

Legend

- (C) Team captain
- (S) Suspended
- (I) Ineligible
- (W) Walk-on
- Injured
- Current redshirt

Roster
Last update: July 10, 2017

== Schedule and results ==
- Date time, TV	Rank^{#}	Opponent^{#}	Result	Record	High points	High rebounds	High assists	Site (attendance) city, state
  Spain Exhibition Trip
  Aug 4, 2017*; 2:00 p.m.		Madrid Generals	W 84–80	–	26 – Martin	9 – Martin	7 – Baldwin	Pabellon Polideportivo "Javier Limones"; Torrejón de Ardoz, Madrid, Spain
  Aug 6, 2017*; 6:00 a.m.		Albacete Basket	W 85–51	–	20 – Jorgensen	9 – Martin	5 – Baldwin	Pabellón del Parque; Albacete, Spain
  Aug 8, 2017*; 1:00 p.m.		Valencia All-Stars	W 81–68	–	15 – Baldwin	7 – Martin	5 – Tied	Pabellon Municipal de Godella; València, Spain
  Aug 10, 2017*; 1:30 p.m.		Union Dax-Gamarde	W 80–74	–	15 – Baldwin	5 – Martin	5 – Baldwin	Pavello Esportiu Municipal; Sant Julià de Vilatorta, Catalonia, Spain
  Exhibition
  Oct 28, 2017*; 2:00 p.m.		Hanover	W 68–36	–	14 – McDermott	6 – Martin	4 – McDermott	Hinkle Fieldhouse (7,571); Indianapolis, IN
  Nov 4, 2017*; 7:00 p.m.		Lincoln Memorial	W 86–79	–	19 – Martin	7 – Martin	4 – Baldwin	Hinkle Fieldhouse (7,685); Indianapolis, IN
  Non-conference regular season
  Nov 10, 2017*; 7:00 p.m., FCS		Kennesaw State	W 82–64	1–0	20 – Martin	9 – Martin	5 – Thompson	Hinkle Fieldhouse (9,138); Indianapolis, IN
  Nov 12, 2017*; 6:00 p.m, CBSSN		Princeton	W 85–75	2–0	20 – Martin	13 – Martin	3 – Martin	Hinkle Fieldhouse (8,470); Indianapolis, IN
  Nov 15, 2017*; 8:30 p.m, FS1		at Maryland; Gavitt Tipoff Games	L 65–79	2–1	17 – McDermott	6 – Martin	6 – Thompson	Xfinity Center (16,317); College Park, MD
  Nov 18, 2017*; 2:00 p.m., FS2		Furman	W 82–65	3–1	19 – Wideman	7 – Wideman	4 – Tied	Hinkle Fieldhouse (7,827); Indianapolis, IN
  Nov 23, 2017*; 7:00 p.m., ESPN2		vs. Texas; PK80 Motion Bracket quarterfinals	L 48–61	3–2	15 – Baldwin	6 – Baldwin	3 – Thompson	Veterans Memorial Coliseum (6,955); Portland, OR
  Nov 24, 2017*; 3:00 p.m., ESPNU		vs. Portland State; PK80 Motion Bracket consolation 2nd round	W 71–69	4–2	18 – Wideman	8 – Wideman	5 – Jorgensen	Moda Center; Portland, OR
  Nov 26, 2017*; 3:00 p.m., ESPN2		vs. Ohio State; PK80 Motion Bracket 5th place game	W 67–66 ^{OT}	5–2	24 – Martin	8 – Wideman	4 – Baldwin	Veterans Memorial Coliseum (5,910); Portland, OR
  Dec 2, 2017*; 2:00 p.m., FS1		Saint Louis	W 75–45	6–2	20 – Martin	12 – Martin	5 – Thompson	Hinkle Fieldhouse (8,963); Indianapolis, IN
  Dec 5, 2017*; 9:00 p.m., FS1		Utah	W 81–69	7–2	29 – Martin	11 – Martin	5 – Baldwin	Hinkle Fieldhouse (7,638); Indianapolis, IN
  Dec 9, 2017*; 12:00 p.m., FSN		Youngstown State	W 95–67	8–2	19 – Baldwin	7 – Brunk	6 – Thompson	Hinkle Fieldhouse (8,022); Indianapolis, IN
  Dec 16, 2017*; 12:00 p.m., FOX		vs. No. 17 Purdue; Crossroads Classic	L 67–82	8–3	17 – Martin	8 – Jorgensen	4 – Thompson	Bankers Life Fieldhouse; Indianapolis, IN
  Dec 19, 2017*; 8:30 p.m., FS1		Morehead State	W 85–69	9–3	20 – Martin	10 – Martin	5 – Thompson	Hinkle Fieldhouse (7,122); Indianapolis, IN
  Dec 21, 2017*; 7:00 p.m., FSN		Western Illinois	W 107–46	10–3	20 – Tied	12 – Fowler	7 – Martin	Hinkle Fieldhouse (7,779); Indianapolis, IN
  Big East regular season
  Dec 27, 2017; 6:30 p.m., FS1		at Georgetown	W 91–89 ^{2OT}	11–3 (1–0)	31 – Baldwin	12 – McDermott	3 – Tied	Capital One Arena (9,257); Washington, D.C.
  Dec 30, 2017; 4:00 p.m., CBS		No. 1 Villanova	W 101–93	12–3 (2–0)	24 – Martin	9 – Baldwin	7 – Baldwin	Hinkle Fieldhouse (9,244); Indianapolis, IN
  Jan 2, 2018; 7:00 p.m., FS1		at No. 5 Xavier	L 79–86	12–4 (2–1)	28 – Baldwin	11 – McDermott	3 – Jorgensen	Cintas Center (10,609); Cincinnati, OH
  Jan 6, 2018; 2:30 p.m., FS1		No. 21 Seton Hall	L 87–90	12–5 (2–2)	27 – Martin	6 – Baldwin	5 – Baldwin	Hinkle Fieldhouse (8,855); Indianapolis, IN
  Jan 9, 2018; 8:30 p.m., FS1		at No. 25 Creighton	L 74–85	12–6 (2–3)	18 – Jorgensen	11 – Martin	3 – 3 tied	CenturyLink Center Omaha (17,229); Omaha, NE
  Jan 12, 2017; 6:30 p.m., FS1		Marquette	W 94–83	13–6 (3–3)	37 – Martin	7 – Martin	6 – Jorgensen	Hinkle Fieldhouse (8,911); Indianapolis, IN
  Jan 15, 2018; 4:30 p.m., FS1		at Providence	L 60–70	13–7 (3–4)	25 – Baldwin	7 – Tied	7 – Jorgensen	Dunkin' Donuts Center (12,407); Providence, Rhode Island
  Jan 20, 2018; 2:00 p.m., FS1		at DePaul	W 79–67	14–7 (4–4)	24 – Martin	9 – Baldwin	8 – Thompson	Wintrust Arena (6,802); Chicago, IL
  Jan 27, 2018; 2:30 p.m., FS1		St. John's	W 70–45	15–7 (5–4)	19 – Martin	11 – Wideman	5 – Baldwin	Hinkle Fieldhouse (9,129); Indianapolis, IN
  Jan 31, 2018; 9:00 p.m., FS1		at Marquette	W 92–72	16–7 (6–4)	23 – Wideman	9 – Wideman	5 – Baldwin	BMO Harris Bradley Center (12,779); Milwaukee, WI
  Feb 3, 2018; 12:00 p.m., FS1		DePaul	W 80–57	17–7 (7–4)	26 – Martin	6 – Martin	6 – Martin	Hinkle Fieldhouse (8,879); Indianapolis, IN
  Feb 6, 2018; 6:30 p.m., FS1		No. 5 Xavier	L 93–98 ^{OT}	17–8 (7–5)	34 – Martin	7 – Tied	5 – Jorgensen	Hinkle Fieldhouse (9,100); Indianapolis, IN
  Feb 10, 2018; 12:00 p.m., FOX		at No. 1 Villanova	L 75–86	17–9 (7–6)	30 – Martin	6 – Jorgensen	7 – Jorgensen	Wells Fargo Center (20,603); Philadelphia, PA
  Feb 13, 2018; 6:30 p.m., CBSSN		Georgetown	L 83–87	17–10 (7–7)	22 – Martin	8 – Martin	7 – Baldwin	Hinkle Fieldhouse (8,539); Indianapolis, IN
  Feb 17, 2018; 12:00 p.m., FOX		Providence	W 69–54	18–10 (8–7)	19 – Martin	8 – Thompson	2 – 3 tied	Hinkle Fieldhouse (9,184); Indianapolis, IN
  Feb 20, 2018; 7:00 p.m., FS1		Creighton	W 93–70	19–10 (9–7)	26 – Martin	7 – Martin	4 – Baldwin	Hinkle Fieldhouse (8,630); Indianapolis, IN
  Feb 28, 2018; 9:00 p.m., CBSSN		at St. John's	L 68–75 ^{2OT}	19–11 (9–8)	17 – Tied	7 – McDermott	7 – Thompson	Carnesecca Arena (5,602); Queens, NY
  Mar 3, 2018; 8:00 p.m., CBSSN		at Seton Hall	L 70–77	19–12 (9–9)	35 – Martin	7 – Martin	2 – Tied	Prudential Center (9,743); Newark, NJ
  Big East tournament
  Mar 8, 2018; 9:30 p.m., FS1	(6)	vs. (3) Seton Hall; Quarterfinals	W 75–74	20–12	32 – Baldwin	7 – McDermott	3 – Baldwin	Madison Square Garden (19,812); New York, NY
  Mar 9, 2018; 9:00 p.m., FS1	(6)	vs. (2) No. 7 Villanova; Semifinals	L 68–87	20–13	13 – Martin	5 – Tied	4 – Tied	Madison Square Garden (19,812); New York, NY
  NCAA tournament
  Mar 16, 2018*; 3:10 p.m., truTV	(10 E)	vs. (7 E) Arkansas; First Round	W 79–62	21–13	27 – Martin	9 – 3 tied	7 – Thompson	Little Caesars Arena (20,163); Detroit, MI
  Mar 18, 2018*; 12:20 p.m., CBS	(10 E)	vs. (2 E) No. 11 Purdue; Second Round	L 73–76	21–14	29 – Martin	5 – Martin	4 – Thompson	Little Caesars Arena (20,360); Detroit, MI
  *Non-conference game. ^{#}Rankings from AP Poll. (#) Tournament seedings in parentheses. E=East Region. All times are in Eastern Time.

== Rankings ==
Ranking movements Legend: ██ Increase in ranking ██ Decrease in ranking — = Not ranked RV = Received votes
	Week																			
Poll	Pre	1	2	3	4	5	6	7	8	9	10	11	12	13	14	15	16	17	18	Final
AP	RV	RV	—	—	—	—	—	—	RV	—	—	—	—	RV	RV	RV	RV	RV	—	Not released
Coaches	RV	RV	RV	RV	RV	—	—	—	RV	—	—	—	—	RV	RV	RV	RV	RV	RV	RV

*AP does not release post-NCAA tournament rankings

== Awards ==
Name	Award(s)
Kelan Martin	Preseason All-Big East First Team; Big East Player of the Week – Nov. 13; Big East Player of the Week – Jan. 2 Lute Olsen National Player of the Week – Jan. 2 Big East Player of the Week – Jan. 15; All-Big East First Team
Tyler Wideman	Big East Sportsmanship Award
