= Shamorie Ponds =

American basketball player (born 1998)

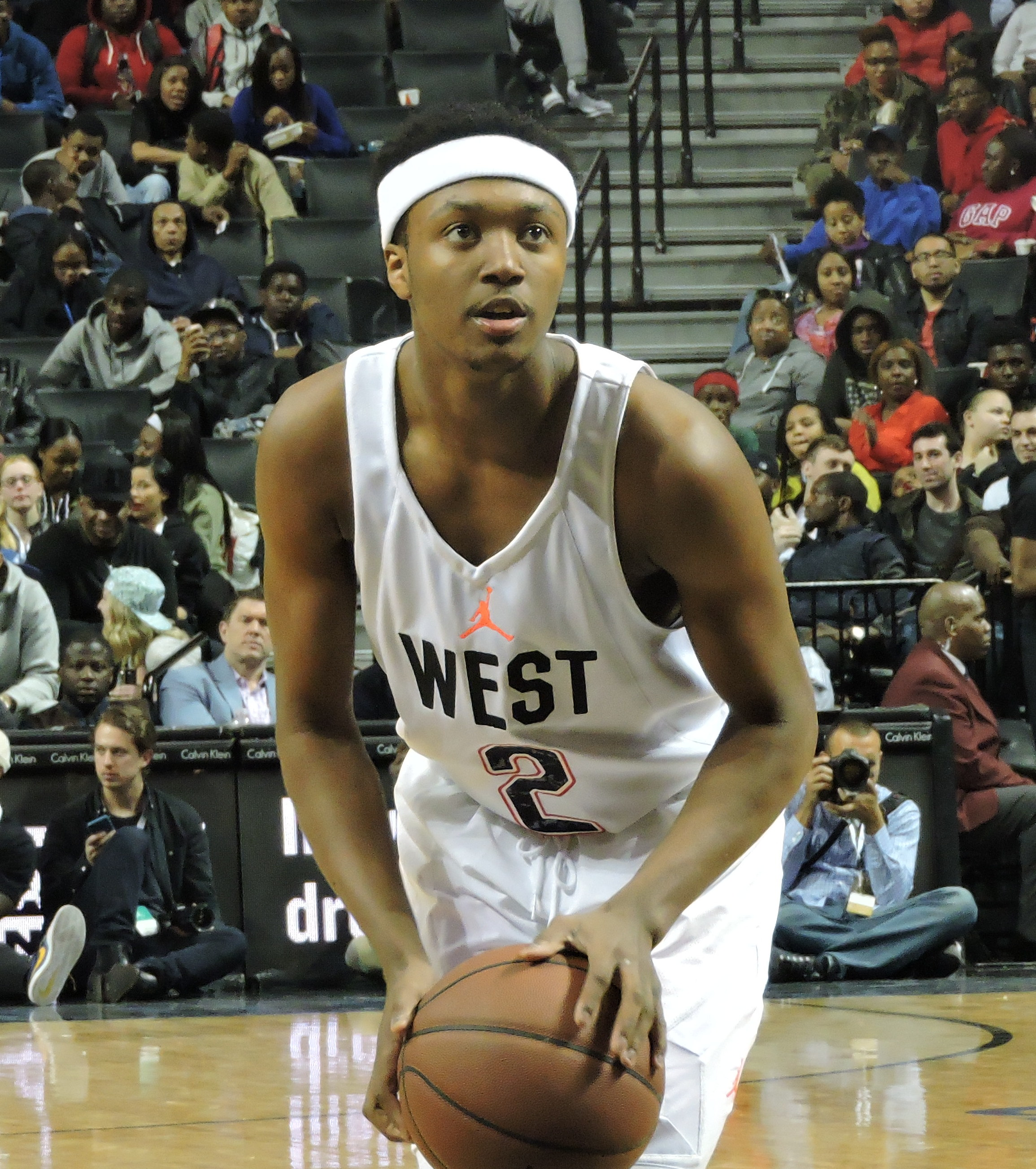

Free Agent
- Position: Point guard

Personal information
- Born: June 29, 1998 (age 28) Brooklyn, New York, U.S.
- Listed height: 6 ft 0 in (1.83 m)
- Listed weight: 175 lb (79 kg)

Career information
- High school: Thomas Jefferson (Brooklyn, New York)
- College: St. John's (2016–2019)
- NBA draft: 2019: undrafted
- Playing career: 2019–present

Career history
- 2019–2020: Toronto Raptors
- 2019–2020: →Raptors 905
- 2021: Spars
- 2021–2022: Delaware Blue Coats
- 2023: Astros de Jalisco
- 2023: Al Rayyan
- 2024: Club Malvín
- 2024: Marinos de Oriente
- 2024: Erdenet Miners
- 2025: Dorados de Chihuahua
- 2025–2026: Sichuan Blue Whales
- 2026: Hong Kong Bulls

Career highlights
- NBL champion (2026); CIBACOPA champion (2023); CIBACOPA Finals MVP (2023); 2× AP Honorable Mention All-American (2018, 2019); 2× First-team All-Big East (2018, 2019); Big East All-Freshman team (2017); Haggerty Award winner (2018)
- Stats at NBA.com
- Stats at Basketball Reference

Shamorie Saequan Ponds (born June 29, 1998) is an American professional basketball player who last played Hong Kong Bulls of the National Basketball League (NBL). He played college basketball for the St. John's Red Storm.

== High school career ==
Ponds played high school basketball for Thomas Jefferson High School in Brooklyn, New York, where in 2016 he led the team to its first New York City title since 1954. He chose to attend nearby St. John's to play for coach Chris Mullin.

Ponds was rated as a four-star recruit and ranked 37th overall recruit and 9th best point guard in the 2016 high school class.

== College career ==
As a freshman, Ponds was one of the top freshmen in the Big East Conference, averaging 17.4 points and averaging 3.3 assists as the starting point guard for the Red Storm. At the close of the season, Ponds was named to the conference all-freshman team.

Following his freshman year, Ponds became a top player in the Big East as a sophomore. Ponds made a national name for himself with standout performances in back to back upset wins over fourth-ranked Duke, top-ranked Villanova, as well as scoring 44 points, a Carnesecca Arena record, against the Marquette Golden Eagles. At the close of the season, Ponds was named first-team All-Big East and won the Haggerty Award as the top college player in the New York City metro area.

Following his sophomore season, Ponds declared his eligibility for the 2018 NBA draft. He did not initially hire an agent. He decided to return to St. John's for his junior season. Ponds averaged 19.7 points, 4.1 rebounds, 5.1 assists, and 2.6 steals in 35.1 minutes per game as a junior. He left St. John's for the NBA after the season concluded.

== Professional career ==
=== Toronto Raptors (2019–2020) ===
After going undrafted in the 2019 NBA draft, the Houston Rockets signed Ponds to a contract to play in the 2019 NBA Summer League and take part in training camp. He later had his contract converted to a two-way deal, a decision which was later reversed. On October 19, 2019, the Rockets released Ponds.

On October 23, 2019, the Toronto Raptors announced they had signed Ponds to a two-way contract. Under the terms of the deal, he would split time between the Raptors and their NBA G League affiliate, the Raptors 905. On November 27, 2019, Ponds made his NBA debut against the New York Knicks, scoring 4 points and making his first NBA basket. On December 31, 2019, Ponds set a new career high with 5 points against the Cleveland Cavaliers. On January 15, 2020, the Raptors waived Ponds.

=== Spars (2021) ===
On February 23, 2021, Spars of the Bosnian League announced they had signed Ponds to for the rest of the 2020–21 season.

=== Delaware Blue Coats (2021–2022) ===
Ponds was selected by the Delaware Blue Coats first overall in the 2021 NBA G League draft.

=== Astros de Jalisco (2023) ===
Ponds led the Astros de Jalisco to a CIBACOPA league title in 2023 and was named Finals MVP.

=== Erdenet Miners (2024) ===
In December 2024, Ponds joined the Erdenet Miners of The League.. He averaged 22.8 points, 6.3 rebounds, 4.3 assists, 3.1 steals per game.

=== Sichuan Blue Whales (2025–2026) ===
On December 25, 2025, Ponds joined the Sichuan Blue Whales of CBA.

== Personal life ==
Ponds is the son of Shawn Ponds and Lamell Brightwell. He has two brothers named Shawn and Shamell and one sister, Shaniaya.

== Career statistics ==
Legend
GP	Games played	GS	Games started	MPG	Minutes per game
FG%	Field goal percentage	3P%	3-point field goal percentage	FT%	Free throw percentage
RPG	Rebounds per game	APG	Assists per game	SPG	Steals per game
BPG	Blocks per game	PPG	Points per game	**Bold**	Career high

=== NBA ===
==== Regular season ====
Year	Team	GP	GS	MPG	FG%	3P%	FT%	RPG	APG	SPG	BPG	PPG
2019–20	Toronto	4	0	2.8	.600	.500	1.000	.3	.5	.0	.3	2.3
Career		4	0	2.8	.600	.500	1.000	.3	.5	.0	.3	2.3

=== College ===
Year	Team	GP	GS	MPG	FG%	3P%	FT%	RPG	APG	SPG	BPG	PPG
2016–17	St. John's	**33**	**33**	33.6	.439	**.375**	.823	4.4	3.1	2.1	.2	17.4
2017–18	St. John's	30	30	**37.0**	.420	.253	**.857**	**5.0**	4.7	2.3	.1	**21.6**
2018–19	St. John's	**33**	**33**	35.1	**.454**	.353	.836	4.1	**5.1**	**2.6**	**.3**	19.7
Career		96	96	35.2	.437	.328	.840	4.5	4.3	2.3	.2	19.5
