= Mitch Ballock =

American basketball player (born 1998)

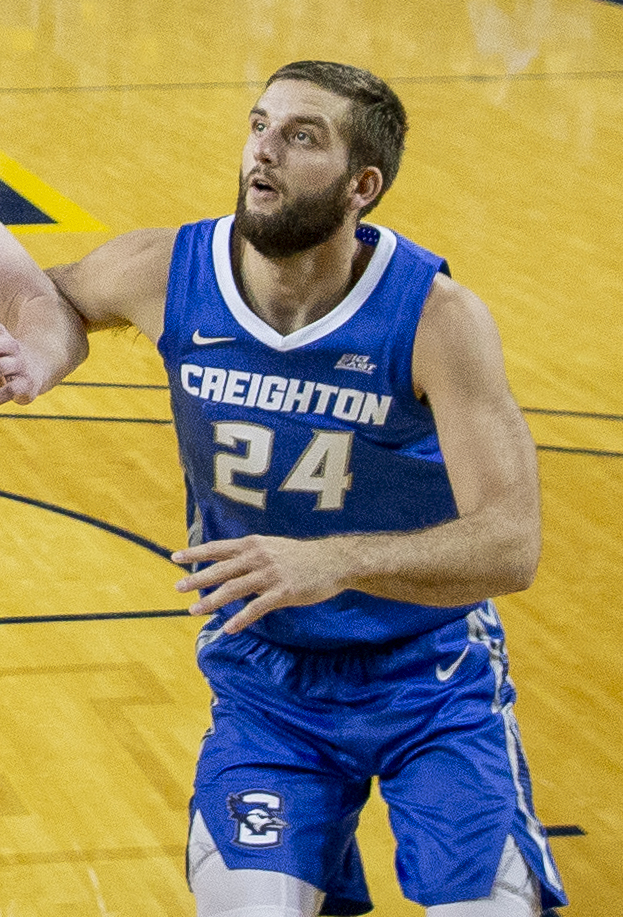
- Ballock with Creighton in 2019

Creighton Bluejays
- Position: Assistant coach
- League: Big East Conference

Personal information
- Born: July 2, 1998 (age 28) Eudora, Kansas
- Listed height: 6 ft 5 in (1.96 m)
- Listed weight: 205 lb (93 kg)

Career information
- High school: Eudora (Eudora, Kansas)
- College: Creighton (2017–2021)
- NBA draft: 2021: undrafted
- Playing career: 2021–2023
- Coaching career: 2023–present

Career history

Playing
- 2021–2022: Cleveland Charge
- 2022–2023: Mitteldeutscher BC

Coaching
- 2023–2025: Creighton (graduate assistant)
- 2025–present: Creighton (assistant)

Career highlights
- Big East All-Freshman Team (2018)
- Stats at NBA.com
- Stats at Basketball Reference

Mitchell Ballock (born July 2, 1998) is an American college basketball coach and former player. He is currently an assistant coach for Creighton University who last played for the Cleveland Charge of the NBA G League. He played college basketball for the Creighton Bluejays.

== High school career ==
Ballock played basketball for Eudora High School in Eudora, Kansas. In his varsity debut, he scored 40 points. As a freshman, he played alongside his older brother, Andrew, and led his team to the Class 4A-II state title. Ballock missed most of his junior season with a torn labrum in his left shoulder. As a senior, he averaged 25.4 points, 8.6 rebounds, 4.1 assists, 2.1 steals and 1.8 blocks per game, helping his team reach the Class 4A sub-state title game. Ballock was named Kansas Gatorade Player of the Year. A four-star recruit, he committed to play college basketball for Creighton over offers from Kansas, Kansas State and Oklahoma, among others.

== College career ==
On November 20, 2017, Ballock scored a freshman season-high 22 points in a 100–89 win over UCLA. As a freshman, he averaged 7.3 points and 2.9 rebounds per game, earning Big East All-Freshman Team honors. In the following season, Ballock moved into a starting role. On March 9, 2019, he scored a career-high 39 points, shooting 11-of-12 from three-point range, in a 91–78 victory over DePaul. He broke the program record and tied the Big East record for three-pointers in a game, while setting the National Collegiate Athletic Association (NCAA) single-game record for three-point percentage with at least 12 attempts. As a sophomore, Ballock averaged 11.1 points, 4.4 rebounds and 3.2 assists per game. On January 1, 2020, he scored a junior season-high 24 points in a 92–75 win over Marquette. As a junior, he averaged 11.9 points, 5.3 rebounds and 3.1 assists per game. Ballock led Creighton in three-pointers made with 95 and three-point percentage with 43.5 percent. He averaged 9.9 points per game as a senior, shooting 38.9 percent from behind the arc. Ballock opted to pursue professional opportunities after the season rather than take advantage of the extra year of eligibility.

== Professional career ==
After going undrafted in the 2021 NBA draft, Ballock joined the Philadelphia 76ers for the 2021 NBA Summer League. On September 27, 2021, he signed with the Cleveland Cavaliers, but was waived on October 16. On October 23, he signed with the Cleveland Charge as an affiliate player.

== Coaching career ==
Following the conclusion of his playing career, Ballock returned to Creighton, first as a graduate assistant, and then as a full-time assistant coach in 2025.

== Personal life ==
Ballock's older brother, Andrew, played college basketball for Missouri Southern, Cloud County Community College and Drury. His sister, Emily, ran track for Wichita State before transferring to Pittsburg State, where Ballock's other sister, Megan, and brother, Justin, also ran track.

== Career statistics ==
Legend
GP	Games played	GS	Games started	MPG	Minutes per game
FG%	Field goal percentage	3P%	3-point field goal percentage	FT%	Free throw percentage
RPG	Rebounds per game	APG	Assists per game	SPG	Steals per game
BPG	Blocks per game	PPG	Points per game	**Bold**	Career high

=== College ===
Year	Team	GP	GS	MPG	FG%	3P%	FT%	RPG	APG	SPG	BPG	PPG
2017–18	Creighton	33	5	21.4	.421	.326	**.808**	2.9	1.9	.7	.2	7.3
2018–19	Creighton	**35**	**35**	33.0	**.455**	.419	.762	4.4	**3.2**	.8	.2	11.1
2019–20	Creighton	31	31	**36.0**	.439	**.435**	.744	**5.3**	3.1	.8	**.3**	**11.9**
2020–21	Creighton	31	31	33.6	.435	.386	.571	3.2	2.6	**.9**	.2	9.9
Career		130	102	30.9	.439	.398	.734	3.9	2.7	.8	.2	10.0
