= 2017–18 Georgetown Hoyas men's basketball team =

American college basketball season

2017–18 Georgetown Hoyas men's basketball
- Conference: Big East
- Record: 15–15 (5–13 Big East)
- Head coach: Patrick Ewing (1st season)
- Assistant coaches: Louis Orr; Robert Kirby; Akbar Waheed
- Home arena: Capital One Arena

2017–18 Big East men's basketball standings
	Conf.				Overall
Team	W		L	PCT	W		L	PCT
No. 3 Xavier	15	–	3	.833	29	–	6	.829
No. 2 Villanova †	14	–	4	.778	36	–	4	.900
Seton Hall	10	–	8	.556	22	–	12	.647
Creighton	10	–	8	.556	21	–	12	.636
Providence	10	–	8	.556	21	–	14	.600
Butler	9	–	9	.500	21	–	14	.600
Marquette	9	–	9	.500	21	–	14	.600
Georgetown	5	–	13	.278	15	–	15	.500
St. John's	4	–	14	.222	16	–	17	.485
DePaul	4	–	14	.222	11	–	20	.355
† 2018 Big East tournament winner Rankings from AP poll

The 2017–18 Georgetown Hoyas men's basketball team represented Georgetown University in the 2017–18 NCAA Division I men's basketball season. The Hoyas, led by first-year head coach Patrick Ewing, played their home games at the Capital One Arena in Washington, D.C. as members of the Big East Conference. They finished the season 15–15, 5–13 in Big East play to finish in eighth place. They lost in the first round of the Big East tournament to St. John's.

== Previous season ==
The Hoyas finished the 2016–17 season at 14–18, 5–13 in Big East play, to finish in ninth place in the conference. As the No. 9 seed in the Big East tournament, they lost in the first round to St. John's. Georgetown finished the season with a losing record for the second straight year, the first time that had happened since the 1971–72 and 1972–73 seasons, and without an invitation to a postseason tournament in consecutive years for the first time since 1973 and 1974.

On March 23, 2017, Georgetown officials announced that head coach John Thompson III had been fired. On April 2, it was reported that Basketball Hall of Famer and Georgetown alumnus Patrick Ewing would replace Thompson as head coach.

== Offseason ==
=== Departures ===
Name	Number	Pos.	Height	Weight	Year	Hometown	Reason
L. J. Peak	0	G/F	6'5"	215	Junior	Gaffney, SC	Declared for 2017 NBA draft
Tre Campbell	1	G	6'2"	170	Junior	Washington, D.C.	Left the team for personal reasons
Reggie Cameron II	5	F	6'7"	225	Senior	Hackensack, NJ	Graduated
Isaac Copeland	11	F	6'9"	220	Junior	Raleigh, NC	Transferred (mid-season) to Nebraska
Akoy Agau	22	F	6'8"	235	RS Junior	Omaha, NE	Graduate transfer to SMU
Rodney Pryor	23	G	6'5"	205	RS Senior	Evanston, IL	Graduated
Bradley Hayes	42	C	7'0"	275	RS Senior	Jacksonville, FL	Graduated

=== Incoming transfers ===
Name	Number	Pos.	Height	Weight	Year	Hometown	Notes
Greg Malinowski	11	G/F	6'6"	210	Senior	Chantilly, VA	Transferred from William & Mary. Under NCAA transfer rules, Malinowski had to sit out the 2017–18 season.
Trey Dickerson	13	G	6'1"	160	RS Senior	Queens, NY	Transferred from South Dakota. Eligible to play immediately because he graduated from South Dakota.

=== 2017 recruiting class ===
College recruiting
Name	Hometown	School	Height	Weight	Commit date
Chris Sodom #26 C	Phoenix, AZ	Notre Dame High School	7 ft 2 in (2.18 m)	225 lb (102 kg)	May 7, 2017
Chris Sodom #26 C	Recruit ratings: Scout: Rivals: 247Sports: (80)				
Antwan Walker; PF	Washington, DC	Hargrave Military Academy	6 ft 7 in (2.01 m)	215 lb (98 kg)	Oct 25, 2016
Antwan Walker; PF	Recruit ratings: Scout: Rivals: 247Sports: (81)				
Jahvon Blair; PG	Toronto, ON	Athlete Institute Basketball Academy	6 ft 3 in (1.91 m)	N/A	Apr 21, 2017
Jahvon Blair; PG	Recruit ratings: Scout: Rivals: 247Sports: (NR)				
Jamorko Pickett; SF	Washington, DC	Massanutten Military Academy	6 ft 9 in (2.06 m)	215 lb (98 kg)	Jul 25, 2017
Jamorko Pickett; SF	Recruit ratings: Scout: Rivals: 247Sports: (NR)				
Overall recruit ranking:
Note: In many cases, Scout, Rivals, 247Sports, On3, and ESPN may conflict in their listings of height and weight.; In these cases, the average was taken. ESPN grades are on a 100-point scale.; Sources: "2017 Team Ranking". Rivals.

== Arrival of Patrick Ewing ==
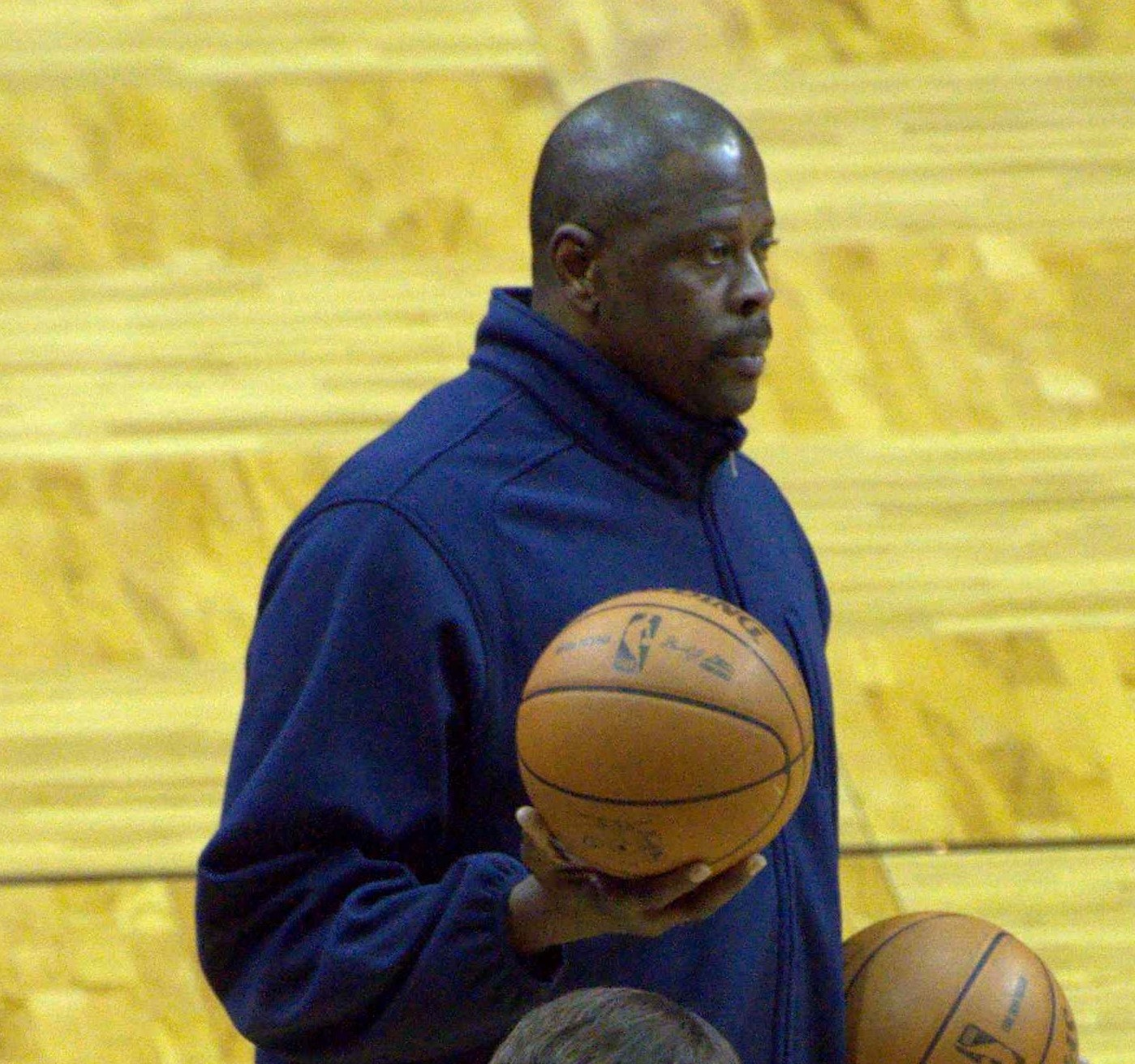
Head coach Patrick Ewing on court in April 2018

On April 3, 2017, Georgetown hired Patrick Ewing to replace the fired John Thompson III as head coach. Generally considered the greatest player in Georgetown men's basketball history, Ewing had led the Georgetown teams of 1981 through 1985, which had reached the NCAA Division I men's basketball tournament′s championship game three times and won one national championship, in 1984. He then went on to a Naismith Basketball Hall of Fame 17-season playing career in the National Basketball Association, playing for the New York Knicks from 1985 to 2000, the Seattle SuperSonics from 2000 to 2001, and the Orlando Magic from 2001 to 2002. After that, he spent 15 years as an NBA assistant coach, with the Washington Wizards from 2002 to 2003, the Houston Rockets from 2003 to 2006, the Orlando Magic from 2007 to 2012, and the Charlotte Bobcats/Charlotte Hornets from 2012 to 2017. Although he had made it clear that he desired a head coaching job in the NBA and had interviewed for head coaching positions, he had never been a head coach at any level before taking the job at Georgetown. After taking over at Georgetown, he told the press that he never would have considered taking a college coaching job anywhere except at Georgetown where, he said, "I was able to...spend four of the best years of my life."

After graduating from Georgetown in 1985, Ewing had left the world of college basketball behind completely during his 32 years of playing and coaching in the NBA. The role of a college coach differed significantly from that of an NBA coach: Player acquisition was very different, requiring compliance with a myriad of National Collegiate Athletic Association recruiting and eligibility rules and a nearly constant recruiting effort. Since his college days, much had changed in college basketball, including the rise of the influence of the Amateur Athletic Union and the orientation of recruiting and coaching toward developing players for NBA careers, as well as the impatience of many college players, who tended to view their college careers as a necessary step on their way to an NBA career but no longer viewed college as a four-year – or even any more than a one-year – commitment. College coaching also required a significant amount of off-court player management, such as ensuring players went to class and met Georgetown's academic eligibility requirements. Critics of Georgetown's decision to hire Ewing argued that his lack of experience in these matters would undermine his ability to lead the Georgetown program. Ewing countered that he had a great deal of experience with young NBA players who had foregone some or all of their college eligibility to play in the NBA and that he had hired a staff including assistant coaches Louis Orr and Robert Kirby – that could provide him with well-informed advice and guide him through the modern world of college basketball. However, his arrival required the departure of his son, Patrick Ewing Jr., a former Georgetown player who had served under John Thompson III as an assistant coach since August 2015; under Georgetown University's nepotism policies, the younger Ewing was not allowed to serve in a position in which he reported directly to his father. Many commentators mocked the idea of a nepotism clause at Georgetown given John Thompson III's 13-year tenure as head coach while his father, former Georgetown head coach John Thompson Jr., remained a major figure in the men's basketball program, but the clause did not apply in that case because the younger Thompson was not on his father's staff, reporting to athletic director Lee Reed and not to his father.

Ewing said he would abandon John Thompson III's deliberate "Princeton offense" and move Georgetown's game toward an uptempo, NBA-style offense favored by NBA scouts and more suitable to the playing style of contemporary players. He also promised a more physical defense of the type that both Georgetown and the original Big East Conference had been known for in their 1980s heyday. He also told reporters that he thought he could improve Georgetown's recruiting efforts by offering players an easier path to the NBA, which he believed he understood better than most college coaches.

== Season recap ==
Georgetown had lost seven players – including its five top scorers – since the conclusion of the previous season. Among those departing were the team's two top scorers of 2016–2017, senior guard Rodney Pryor and junior forward L. J. Peak; Pryor graduated in 2017 after a single season with the Hoyas, and Peak declared for the 2017 NBA draft, foregoing his senior year of college. Starting center Bradley Hayes and power forward Reggie Cameron II graduated in 2017. Junior forward Isaac Copeland had transferred to Nebraska in mid-season, and redshirt junior forward Akoy Agau, after a single season of action with the Hoyas and with two seasons of college eligibility remaining, transferred to SMU during the offseason. Junior guard Tre Campbell left the team after 2016–2017 for personal reasons and, although he remained on scholarship and enrolled at Georgetown for his senior year, he was not on Georgetown's roster and sat out the 2017–2018 basketball season. Another loss was Tremont Waters. Georgetown had lacked a true point guard since the graduation of Markel Starks in 2014, and John Thompson III had attempted to address that by recruiting Waters in the fall of 2016, but Waters had withdrawn his commitment to Georgetown in March 2017 amid the turmoil that surrounded the Georgetown men's basketball program in the aftermath of the 2016–2017 team's losing season. Ewing attempted to re-recruit Waters, but ultimately failed when Waters committed to LSU in early June 2017.

Senior Jonathan Mulmore and sophomore Jagan Moseley at guard, junior guard/forward Kaleb Johnson, junior forward Marcus Derrickson, and junior center Jesse Govan all returned for another year. Senior forward Trey Mourning, the son of Georgetown great Alonzo Mourning, rumored to be considering a transfer at the end of the previous season, also decided to return for 2017–2018, although he suffered a knee injury that forced him to sit out the entire season. The team's former student manager, senior guard Ra'Mond Hines, made the team as a walk-on for the third straight year, while sophomore forward George Muresan, the son of former NBA player Gheorghe Muresan, made the team as a walk-on for a second straight year.

Four freshmen – guard Jahvon Blair, forwards Jamorko Pickett and Antwan Walker, and 7-foot-3 (221-cm) center Chris Sodom – joined the team. Two upperclassmen also arrived: Redshirt senior guard Trey Dickerson came to Georgetown from South Dakota as a graduate transfer, eligible to play immediately, while senior guard Greg Malinowski transferred to Georgetown from William and Mary; Malinowski had to sit out the 2017–2018 season in accordance with NCAA rules for transferring players, but planned to play for Georgetown as a redshirt senior in 2018-2019.

The 2017-2018 squad faced a rebuilding year in which it had arguably the lowest expectations of any Big East Conference team. A preseason poll of Big East coaches picked the Hoyas to finish ninth in the 10-team conference, while pundits raised the prospect of the Hoyas doing little better than winning a game or two against St. John's or DePaul and perhaps going winless in their 18 conference games. The most optimistic projections had Georgetown finishing at 5–13 in the Big East.

=== Nonconference schedule ===
During the head-coaching tenures of John Thompson Jr. and Craig Esherick in the original Big East Conference between 1979 and 2004, Georgetown developed a reputation for scheduling weak non-conference opponents, but during his 13 seasons as head coach at Georgetown between 2004 and 2017, John Thompson III had sought early challenges for his teams during the non-conference portion of the schedule, scheduling ranked opponents, early-season tournaments featuring nationally prominent teams, and distant travel so that his teams could prepare for the Big East Conference season by gaining experience against challenging opponents while facing a demanding travel schedule. Ewing scrapped John Thompson III's approach, returning to the earlier philosophy of arranging a weak early-season schedule. On August 2, in accordance with Ewing's wishes, Georgetown withdrew from the PK-80–Phil Knight Invitational, a high-profile, 16-team, two-bracket tournament in Portland, Oregon, scheduled for November 23–26, in which the Hoyas would have opened with a game against Michigan State, a preseason Top Five team, then faced either Connecticut or 2017 Final Four participant Oregon in the second round the following day, and finished two days later with a final game against Arkansas, North Carolina, or Portland. Big East rival DePaul replaced Georgetown in the tournament. Georgetown athletic director Lee Reed issued a statement explaining the withdrawal, saying "The Georgetown's men's basketball program is in the midst of an exciting time of rebuilding. Georgetown has a prominent, seasoned head coach who has begun this process, which will continue to develop in the fall." The withdrawal reportedly left Georgetown with nine or ten open slots left to fill in its 2017-2018 schedule, which CBS Sports′ Matt Norlander described on August 2 as "an enormous amount of open dates for a Big East program to fill this deep into the offseason." But Ewing saw no need to pit his team against some of the toughest teams in the United States during his first season as head coach, explaining his decision to withdraw this way: "“It's my belief that, why go out there and get my ass kicked to show my recruits that we need their help when I can stay home and watch other people get their butts kicked...Do my recruiting, keep on telling the people we need that we need them, recruit them, and do my job to help my team, build them up and show them what my visions are of them, and win as many games as we can.” Later in August, Ewing also threw cold water on the idea of renewing Georgetown's rivalry with Maryland any time soon. After not meeting in a non-tournament game since 1993, the Hoyas and Terrapins had met in a home-and-home series over the past two seasons as part of the annual Gavitt Tipoff Games between the Big East and Big Ten conferences, Maryland winning both games in tight contests, raising hope among fans in the Washington, D.C., area that Georgetown-Maryland meetings would become annual events. On August 24, however, Ewing told the press, "I'm not thinking about Maryland. I'm not sure if or when we will schedule Maryland. My focus is on getting us back strong.” The Hoyas did not participate in the Gavitt Tipoff Games in 2017, and Maryland was not on Georgetown's 2017–2018 schedule. Discussing his scheduling philosophy in August with The Washington Post, Ewing said, “The Big East schedule is going to be tough enough to handle. It's always been tough. It was tough when I was playing. So, you know, you don't have to play the toughest nonconference schedule. It's all about where you end up at the end. . .Do the best job that we can in the Big East and let the chips fall where they may. And hopefully we'll be able to be in the NCAAs and do our work there.”

Georgetown released its 2017–2018 schedule on September 12, and it immediately provided one of the main narratives of the season. The non-conference schedule included no tournaments, and the average RPI of non-conference opponents for the season was a lowly 265.1. The opponents for 2017–2018 and their 2016–2017 RPI rankings among the 351 NCAA Division I teams were Richmond (72), Syracuse (86), Mount St. Mary's (137), Maryland Eastern Shore (279), Jacksonville (305), Maine (323), Coppin State (336), North Texas (338), Howard (339), North Carolina A&T (350), and Alabama A&M (351). Maine was picked to finish last in the America East Conference in a preseason poll of the conference's coaches, had not won more than eight games in any of the previous four seasons, and had not had a winning season since 2009-2010. Four of the teams were from the Mid-Eastern Athletic Conference (MEAC), ranked 31st among the 32 Division I conferences during the 2016–2017 college basketball season, and none of those four were among the top five MEAC teams of 2016–2017; moreover, MEAC coaches in a preseason poll picked North Carolina A&T – which had posted a 3–29 record the previous season – to finish last in the conference. Overall, Georgetown's opponents had gone 116–230 (.335) against Division I schools during 2016–2017; five of them had failed to win 10 games all season, while one had won 10. The contractually obligated Syracuse game – part of a two-season home-and-home series between the former archrivals in the original Big East Conference of 1979–2013 – provided Georgetown with its only truly challenging non-conference game, and even then Syracuse was facing a down year in which pundits projected the Orange to finish next-to-last in the Atlantic Coast Conference. None of the schools had received an at-large bid to the 2017 NCAA tournament – Mount St. Mary's, a 16th-seed in the tournament, was the only team among Georgetown's 11 non-conference opponents that made the tournament and did so via an automatic bid by winning the 2017 Northeast Conference tournament – and none of them were projected to make the 2018 NCAA tournament; preseason prognosticators raised the possibility that none of them would make even the 2018 National Invitation Tournament. Other than a visit to Richmond, the entire non-conference schedule was at home.

Pundits indulged in a chorus of criticism of Georgetown's nonconference schedule. Kerry Miller of Bleacher Report called the schedule "terrible," observing that "constructing a strong nonconference schedule for college basketball is an art form, and Georgetown is No. 1 on the list of teams that miserably failed that art class this year" and that "this might be the worst nonconference schedule in major-conference history;" Miller offered the possibility that the Hoyas "could be headed for an interesting dichotomy: Georgetown going 11-0 in nonconference play before going 0-18 in the Big East." Other basketball media members called the schedule "embarrassing," "pathetic," "ridiculously weak," "atrocious," "among the worst non-conference schedule I have ever seen," "perhaps the worst non-con[ference] schedule ever," and "the worst non-conference basketball schedule ever." Critics also noted that even if the Hoyas had an unexpectedly strong showing in Big East play, the non-conference schedule's weakness would work against Georgetown when the selection committee for the 2018 NCAA Tournament made its picks the following March, virtually precluding Georgetown's consideration for the NCAA Tournament and even for the 2018 National Invitation Tournament. Ewing made no apologies for how he scheduled the team, dismissing concerns about the non-conference schedule by saying, "It's all a work in progress. To me everything is a work in progress to get ready for the Big East. The Big East is where everything starts for me. The Big East is a make or break for us...My guys are coming off two poor years, and it is my job to mend their egos and to get them to believe in themselves again. The Big East is what it's all about. Get our guys believing in themselves and get ready for the Big East competition."

Regardless of the debate over their schedule, the Hoyas began their season two months to the day after it was announced, on November 12, opening a three-game homestand by facing Jacksonville at Capital One Arena, as the Verizon Center had been renamed in August 2017. It was Ewing's first game as a head coach at any level, and in honor of the occasion Ewing's former college and NBA rival Michael Jordan, former Georgetown and NBA players Alonzo Mourning and Dikembe Mutombo, Washington Wizards and former Georgetown player Otto Porter Jr., Wizards head coach Scott Brooks, and Ewing's former New York Knicks coach and television analyst Jeff Van Gundy all were in the crowd, and Ewing told the press that his high-school coach also was at the game. The crowd cheered loudly when Ewing first walked onto the court about 10 minutes before the opening tipoff, and gave him an ovation when the spotlight fell on him during pregame introductions. The Hoyas held the Dolphins – who were coming off their first winning season in six years – to 23.3 percent shooting from the field in the first half and 32.7 percent for the game as Georgetown cruised to a 73–57 victory and Ewing's first head-coaching win. Jesse Govan led the Hoyas with a double-double (20 points and 15 rebounds), and Marcus Derrickson also scored 20.

Over the next six days, the homestand continued with victories over Mount St. Mary's, which had not defeated Georgetown since 1961, and Maryland Eastern Shore, which was missing five players projected preseason as starters because of eligibility problems and other reasons. Against Mount St. Mary's, the Hoyas scored 102 points – their first 100-plus-point game since they scored 105 against South Carolina Upstate in their season opener the previous year – and Jesse Govan had his second straight double-double with 20 points and 14 rebounds, while Jahvon Blair contributed 19 points and five assists, Jagan Moseley scored 15 points and also recorded five assists, and Kaleb Johnson and Jamorko Pickett each had 14 points and seven rebounds. Three days later against Maryland Eastern Shore, Johnson scored a career-high 24 points, Govan had his third straight double-double (23 points and 14 rebounds), Marcus Derrickson had his third career double-double (14 points and 10 rebounds), Blair scored 12 points, and Jonathan Mulmore posted 10 points and recorded five assists.

Beginning the season with a record of 3–0 for the first time since 2014–2015, the Hoyas traveled to Richmond, Virginia, to meet Richmond at the Robins Center a week later in Georgetown's only non-conference game of the season away from Capital One Arena; it was part of a home-and-home series in which Richmond would visit Georgetown the following season. Richmond, although only 1–3 on the season entering the game, had been a 2017 National Invitation Tournament quarterfinalist and as Georgetown's second-strongest non-conference opponent posed the biggest challenge thus far in Georgetown's young season. With former Georgetown head coach John Thompson Jr. making the trip and looking on from the stands, the Hoyas led by only 40–39 at halftime and had to fend off a Richmond surge in which the Spiders took a 59–57 lead with 9:26 left to play before pulling back ahead and hanging on for an 82–76 win. In a balanced Georgetown attack, Marcus Derrickson scored 16 points and grabbed nine rebounds, Jonathan Mulmore added 15 points and eight assists, Jessie Govan had 14 points and six rebounds, Jamorko Pickett scored 12 points and pulled down seven rebounds, and Kaleb Johnson added 11 points. The win gave Georgetown its first 4–0 start since the 2014–2015 season.

By the time the Hoyas returned to Capital One Arena on November 28 to begin an eight-game homestand by meeting Maine, their first five opponents had a combined record of 9–25 (.265) on the season, and two of them had won only one game. Georgetown defeated Maine – a team that was missing three of its starters and had a record of 1–6 entering the game – but the Hoyas′ strength of schedule fell to 348th or 349th, depending on the ranking system, out of 351 Division I teams. Georgetown followed up over the next 11 days with wins over Coppin State, Howard, and North Carolina A&T. Georgetown cruised to easy wins in all four games, and the resulting 5–0, 6–0, 7–0, and 8–0 records for the Hoyas represented their first start with each of those records since the 2010–2011 season. The Coppin State game was the Hoyas′ fourth consecutive and fourth overall appearance in the annual BB&T Classic, and they improved their all-time record in the Classic to 4–0, but by the time they had beaten Howard, their strength of schedule had fallen to 351st, the weakest among NCAA Division I teams. Jessie Govan scored 16 points and grabbed eight rebounds against Maine, then recorded three straight double-doubles – his fourth, fifth, and sixth of the season – with a season-high 26 points and a career-high 16 rebounds against Coppin State, 24 points against Howard in a game in which he tied his career best with 16 rebounds and also blocked three shots, and 22 points and 15 rebounds against North Carolina A&T. Kaleb Johnson scored 18 against both Maine and Howard – in the Howard game on 6-for-6 shooting from the field, including 2-for-2 from three-point range, and a 4-for-4 performance from the free-throw line – and he finished with 10 points against North Carolina A&T. Marcus Derrickson scored 12 points and went 6–for–6 in free throws against Maine and had 13 points against Coppin State, and he contributed 16 points and nine rebounds against Howard. Jamorko Pickett finished with 13 points against Coppin State and 12 against North Carolina A&T. In the Maine game, Jonathan Mulmore scored 10 points and recorded five assists, while Jahvon Blair came off the bench to add 11 points.

North Carolina A&T's loss to Georgetown dropped the Aggies to 5–4, but they were the only team with a winning record the Hoyas had faced all season. Defeating North Carolina A&T gave Georgetown an 8–0 record and made the Hoyas one of only six NCAA Division I teams without a loss during the season. However, Georgetown also had the weakest strength of schedule – 351st out of 351 – among Division I schools. By the time the Hoyas beat North Carolina A&T on December 9, Georgetown's previous seven opponents were a combined 13-54 (.194) on the season, and the Hoyas′ previous three opponents (Maine, Coppin State, and Howard) had a combined record of 2–26 (.071). By December 15 – the eve of the Hoyas′ meeting with Syracuse – Georgetown's first eight opponents were a combined 24-64 (.273) on the season. The lackluster games resulted in lackluster attendance: The crowd of 9,212 for the season opener against Jacksonville left the 20,356-seat Capital One Arena less than half-full, and since then the Hoyas had averaged 5,247 fans per game and never had reached 6,500 for any game. When reporters again asked Ewing immediately after the North Carolina A&T game about the unambitious schedule he had put together, he dismissed their concerns by saying, "It's a great schedule, a great schedule. All the people worried about the schedule are all you guys."

The Hoyas had a week off before facing Syracuse, Georgetown's archrival in the original Big East, and during that week the letter "S" was "prohibited" on the Georgetown campus, being covered over or X-ed out everywhere it appeared on a sign. The game was Georgetown's only real challenge of the nonconference schedule, and it pitted Patrick Ewing against Jim Boeheim – Syracuse's head coach back in Ewing's playing days at Georgetown – as head coaches for the first time, prompting nostalgia about the early 1980s heyday of the original Big East Conference. Neither team led by more than five points during the first half, and the Hoyas held a 28–24 lead at halftime. Georgetown pulled out to a 53–40 lead in the second half before the Orange, led by freshman small forward Oshae Brissett – who scored only one point in the first half but 24 after halftime – began a comeback, going on a 5–0 scoring run to close the gap to 53–45 with 9:55 remaining in regulation. Georgetown still led 64–57 when Marcus Derrickson fouled out with 5:23 left in the second half. With a minute left in regulation, Syracuse sophomore guard Frank Howard stripped the ball from Jesse Govan and scored on a layup to tie the game 69–69, but then Syracuse missed three straight shots and the game remained tied at 69–69 at the end of regulation. Syracuse sophomore guard Tyus Battle led the Orange in overtime, scoring eight points after the end of regulation, including a three-pointer that put Syracuse ahead for good at 72–69. Syracuse, which had outscored Georgetown 29–15 after Derrickson fouled out, won 86–79, dealing the Hoyas their first loss of the season. The win snapped a two-game Orange losing streak against the Hoyas and was their first road win against Georgetown since 2011, while the Hoyas missed both their first chance to beat Syracuse three games in a row since a four-win streak between 2000 and 2002 and their only chance to pick up a quality win during their non-conference schedule. Both teams shot 10-for-27 (37 percent) from the field and both had 16 turnovers. Jessie Govan had 21 points and eight rebounds and logged a career-high 42 minutes, Jagan Mosely came off the bench to add 20 points, Marcus Derrickson had 14 points and eight rebounds, and Jamorko Pickett scored 12 points.

On December 19, Georgetown announced that freshman center Chris Sodom had been dismissed from the team for violating team rules; it later was revealed that his dismissal stemmed from his involvement in an off-campus altercation. Sodom had had little impact on the team, appearing in only six games and playing only 27 minutes as a Hoya, but his departure left Georgetown with a shortage of depth among its "big men;" with Sodom off the team, Ewing's only option for the rest of the season as a backup for center Jesse Govan and forward Marcus Derrickson became freshman forward Antwan Walker.

The Hoyas completed their non-conference schedule with two more home games, beating North Texas in the first meeting between the schools and then defeating winless Alabama A&M. Against North Texas, with Ewing's former New York Knicks teammate John Starks looking on from the stands, Marcus Derrickson led the Hoyas with 17 points and Jessie Govan had his ninth career double-double and seventh double-double of the season with 12 points and 14 rebounds, while Jonathan Mulmore finished with 12 points and six assists. Three days later in the rout of Alabama A&M – which entered the game with a record of 0–12 and ranked 344th in RPI among the 351 Division I schools – Antwan Walker made his first collegiate start and first appearance in a game since December 9, played a career-high 15 minutes and scored in double figures for the first time with 16 points on 6-of-7 shooting from the field and 4-for-4 from the free-throw line, while Jahvon Blair, making his second collegiate start, scored 13 points. Against Alabama A&M, Jessie Govan had another double-double (11 points and 11 rebounds), his eighth of the season and the tenth of his career, while Jamorko Pickett and Kaleb Johnson added 10 points each.

The Hoyas completed their non-conference schedule with a 10–1 record, their best start to a season since they opened 10–1 in 2012–2013. However, their strength of schedule was 350th among the 351 teams after they defeated North Texas and fell to 351st and last after they beat Alabama A&M. Sports pundits understood Ewing's desire to pad the team's schedule given its limited prospects for the season and its need to rebuild in terms of both talent and confidence. However, sports commentators also viewed the nonconference portion of Georgetown's schedule as harming the team's chances of making the NCAA Tournament even if it won most of its conference games, as well as poorly preparing the Hoyas for the rigors of the upcoming Big East season. They also saw it as a missed opportunity to market Georgetown's otherwise faded national brand by highlighting Ewing's return to the school via nationally noted nonconference games, such as those that might have occurred if Georgetown had not withdrawn from the November PK80-Phil Knight Tournament. On the eve of the Syracuse game, college basketball analyst Ken Pomeroy opined that the Hoyas would have to go an unexpected 12–6 in the upcoming Big East season to ensure an NCAA Tournament bid and that even an equally unexpected record of 11–7 might make it difficult for the selection committee to justify a bid. Asked by reporters after the Alabama A&M game whether he felt his team was prepared for Big East play, Ewing was noncommittal, saying, "That's yet to be determined. We just have to stay focused and continue to work hard. Even though we're, what, 10-1 right now, we can't be happy with that. We have to stay hungry. No one expects us to be successful, and we have to have a chip on our shoulder about that. We have to continue to grind. At the end of the year, we'll see where we lie."

=== Conference schedule ===
Georgetown completed its eight-game homestand and opened its Big East season on December 27 with a 91–89 double-overtime loss to Butler, despite pulling out to a 20-point lead in the first half and holding a 42-24 lead over the Bulldogs at halftime; Marcus Derrickson (23 points and 11 rebounds) and Jesse Govan (19 points and 13 rebounds) both had double-doubles, and Jahvon Blair went 11-for-12 from the free-throw line and scored 17 points. The Hoyas then embarked on a two-game road trip in which they finished 2017 with a loss at Marquette and began 2018 with their first conference victory of the season in a game at DePaul. Derrickson scored 20 points at Marquette, and 24 at DePaul, while Kaleb Johnson finished with 12 points at Marquette and Jahvon Blair had a 15-point game against DePaul. Govan had double-doubles in both games, with 11 points and 12 rebounds at Marquette and 25 points and 12 boards at DePaul.

Georgetown returned to Capital One Arena for a one-sided loss to Creighton in which the Hoyas trailed from the opening basket and the Bluejays led by double figures from halfway through the first half through the end of the game; with 11 points, Jahvon Blair was the only Hoya to score in double figures, while Kaleb Johnson grabbed 10 rebounds. Three days later, Georgetown visited Madison Square Garden and defeated St. John's to improve to 2–3 in conference play; Govan had another double-double, scoring 18 points and pulling down 13 rebounds, Derrickson added 17 points, and Jagan Moseley contributed 13. With former St. John's head coach Lou Carnesecca in the stands, the two teams played a lackluster game that betrayed how far the two programs had fallen since their mid-1980s heyday in the original Big East Conference when Carnesecca coached the Red Storm, Ewing played for Georgetown, St. John's head coach Chris Mullin played for St. John's, and the two teams were national powers and faced off in nationally prominent games. However, the meeting was the first between Ewing and Mullin as head coaches, and the game also marked the return of Ewing to Madison Square Garden, where he had played with the New York Knicks in the NBA, and it prompted much nostalgia about both the old Big East and Ewing's 15-year Knicks career; the crowd cheered heartily for Ewing from the moment he came out onto the court and chanted "Patrick! Patrick!" as he exited after the conclusion of the game.

In their next game, the Hoyas faced a ranked opponent for the first time in the season when they traveled to meet No. 13 Seton Hall at the Prudential Center in Newark, New Jersey, on January 13, the first time they had gone without a ranked opponent until mid-January since the 2003-2004 season. Undefeated at home for the season at 10–0, the Pirates were celebrating the 25th anniversary of the 1992–1993 Pirates team that won both the Big East regular season championship and the 1993 Big East tournament, and that season's head coach, P. J. Carlesimo, and Artūras Karnišovas, general manager of the Denver Nuggets and a member of the 1992–1993 Seton Hall team, were in the audience. The Hoyas staked themselves to a 12–3 lead to start the game, but the Pirates took advantage of Georgetown turnovers to come back with a 29–10 scoring run in the final 11 minutes of the first half and go into the locker room with a 44–31 at halftime. In the second half, the Pirates pulled out to a 16–point advantage before the Hoyas cut Seton Hall's lead to 60–52 with eight minutes to play, but Seton Hall extended its lead to 62–52 with 6:29 left and to 69-54 with 3:28 remaining on the way to a 74–61 win. It was Seton Hall's fifth straight victory over Georgetown, and the Pirates improved their all-time record against the Hoyas to 47–57 – dating back to the first meeting between the schools on December 10, 1909 – and to 21–41 since the two teams joined the original Big East Conference as charter members in 1979. Marcus Derrickson led the Hoyas with 18 points, while Kaleb Johnson scored 14 points and Jahvon Blair and Jesse Govan had 11 each.

Four days later, the Hoyas were at Capital One Arena to open a three-game homestand by playing another ranked opponent, No. 1 Villanova. It was the first time Ewing had faced Villanova in any capacity since the Wildcats upset the Hoyas in his final game as a college player to win the national championship in the 1985 NCAA tournament. The game quickly became a blowout, as Villanova went on an 18–0 scoring run to take a 31–8 lead in the first half. By halftime, when Villanova led 42–20, Georgetown had more turnovers (nine) than baskets (eight), and had shot only 8-for-26 (30.8 percent) from the field, including 0-for-8 in three-pointers. During the second half, Villanova continued to extend its lead, which reached its peak at 88–44 with about 3 1/2 minutes remaining. With about 2 1/2 minutes left, Villanova head coach Jay Wright took his starters out of the game, and with the Wildcats′ bench players on the floor, the Hoyas concluded the game with a 12–0 scoring run, closing to 88–56 at the final buzzer. For the game, the Wildcats shot 17-for-33 (51.5 percent) from three-point range, while the Hoyas shot only 4-for-15 (26.7 percent) from the beyond the arc. Jesse Govan, the only Georgetown player to score in double figures, finished with 12 points, and Trey Dickerson left the game with back spasms during the first half. It was Villanova's seventh straight victory over Georgetown, the Wildcats′ longest winning streak against the Hoyas since the schools first met in 1922. The 32-point loss was Georgetown's worst since December 10, 1974, when Maryland beat the Hoyas by 33 points, 104–71, and it dropped the Hoyas to 12–6 on the season, 2–5 in the Big East. Georgetown's easy non-conference schedule had inflated the Hoyas′ overall record and, when the press asked him what the game said about the true contrast between the state of the Georgetown's men's basketball program and that of a national power like Villanova, Ewing replied, "I'm not even thinking about that. All I'm thinking about is that they're a good team and tonight was their night. That's it. . .I've had my butt kicked before – fortunately it was as a player – and all I can do is get ready for the next one. You can't dwell on it. Just got to look at the film and make adjustments and get ready for the next game."

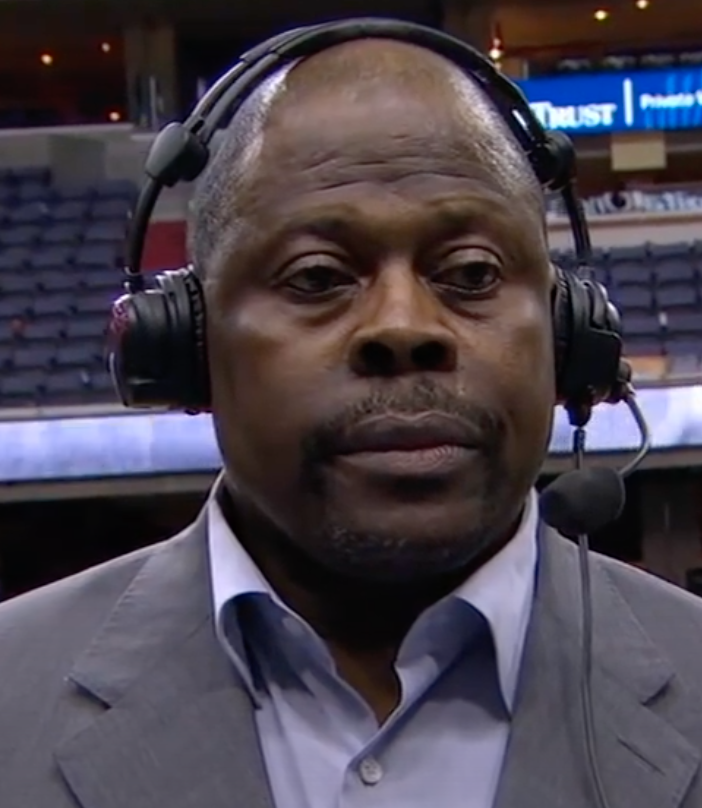
Head coach Patrick Ewing during a television interview at Capital One Arena in Washington, D.C., after the St. John's–Georgetown game of January 20, 2018.

The homestand continued with two close games in which the Hoyas completed a regular-season sweep of the series with St. John's in a double-overtime win but then lost to DePaul. Marcus Derrickson led the Hoyas against St. John's with 27 points, while Jesse Govan and Jamorko Pickett each scored 16, Jahvon Blair finished with 15 off the bench, Jagan Moseley came off the bench to contribute 12, and Trey Dickerson had a double-double (10 points and 11 rebounds); Dickerson scored all of his points in overtime, while Moseley scored seven of his points in the second overtime. In the DePaul game – which the Blue Demons won on the final possession for the second season in a row – Derrickson again led the team with 23 points, Jamorko Pickett had 19 points and eight rebounds, and Moseley finished with 10 off the bench. The Hoyas finished a 1–2 homestand with an overall record of 13–7 and a 3–6 Big East record.

Three road games followed. At Creighton, facing a Bluejays team that was undefeated at home for the season, the Hoyas, one of the ten best free-throwing-shooting teams in the United States, shot 16-for-17 (94.1 percent) from the free-throw line, but nonetheless lost 85–77 as Creighton went 9-for-10 in free throws over the final 51 seconds; Jahvon Blair scored 21 points and Marcus Derrickson finished with 17. A week later, Georgetown visited No. 6 Xavier, the Hoyas' third game of the season against a ranked opponent, in a meeting of the Big East's two top rebounding teams. Xavier, the Big East's second-place team, clung to a 46–44 lead at halftime, and the game saw 20 ties and 21 lead changes, with neither team ever leading by more than five points. With 24.3 seconds left in regulation and Georgetown leading 86–82, Jagan Moseley fouled Xavier senior guard Trevon Bluiett as Bluiett made a three-pointer, and Bluiett sank the resulting free throw to tie the game at 86–86. As time wound down, Jahvon Blair had an open shot that could have won the game but, thinking that the Hoyas should hold the ball for the last shot, passed it up; when he did shoot, attempting a three-pointer with two seconds left to play, he missed badly, and the score stood at 86–86 at the buzzer. In overtime, the Musketeers scored no field goals, but they went 10-for-10 from the free-throw line, and Bluiett – who finished with a season-high 31 points – hit two free throws with 10 seconds left to clinch a 96–91 Xavier victory, the Musketeers′ sixth win in a row. It was Xavier's fourth consecutive defeat of Georgetown and the Musketeers′ seventh win in the past eight meetings between the schools. Jesse Govan, who had posted only 12 points and six rebounds in his last two games combined played a strong inside game in the first half against Xavier, scoring 17 points and grabbing six rebounds before halftime, and he scored 23 points to lead the Hoyas before fouling out early in overtime, while Derrickson had a double-double with 19 points and 15 rebounds; Jamorko Pickett scored 21 points, and Blair came off the bench to add 19. Three days later, the Hoyas′ losing streak reached four when they lost at Providence in a game in which Georgetown led 69-64 with 1:52 remaining but Providence closed out play with a 9–0 scoring run – during which the Friars sank four free throws in the final 4.2 seconds – to win 73–69. Govan equaled his career high by finishing with 27 points against the Friars and was the only Hoya to score in double figures, although Derrickson narrowly missed a double-double with nine points and nine rebounds. The four consecutive losses dropped Georgetown to 13–10 overall and 3–9 in the Big East.

The Hoyas returned home to meet Seton Hall at Capital One Arena and won their first game in three weeks, despite blowing a 17-point early-second-half lead; the Pirates took their first lead of the game at 69–67 with 5:36 left to play after a 10–0 scoring run, but Marcus Derrickson scored a game-winning deep three-pointer with 4.2 seconds remaining and the Hoyas hung on to win 83–80. Georgetown then traveled to face Butler and won again, snapping a four-game road losing streak. Derrickson had a double-double against the Pirates with 22 points and a career-high 18 rebounds, and against the Bulldogs he scored a career-high 27 points – his eighth 20-plus-point game of the season – on 11-of-13 (84.6 percent) shooting from the field. Jesse Govan scored 11 points against Seton Hall and against Butler had his twelfth double-double of the season with 17 points and 12 rebounds. Jamorko Picket had 18 points against Seton Hall and 10 at Butler, while Trey Dickerson, who was averaging only 3.5 points per game entering the Butler game, came off the bench against the Bulldogs to score a personal-best 12 points in the first half on the way to an 18-point game. It was the first time Georgetown had won consecutive games since the back-to-back victories over North Texas and Alabama A&M in the latter half of December and the Hoyas improved to 15–10 on the season and 5–9 in the conference, but the 2017–2018 Georgetown squad would not win again.

Georgetown's season-ending losing streak began when, after an eight-day break in action, they returned to Capital One Area to begin a three-game homestand with their fourth game of the season against a ranked opponent, a rematch with Xavier, which had climbed to No. 4 in the Associated Press Poll. Georgetown led 40–38 at halftime and still led 50–47 in the second half when Xavier went on a decisive 12–0 scoring run to take a 59–50 lead with 12 minutes left to play. Jamorko Pickett tied a career high with 21 points to lead the Hoyas, sinking a career-high six three-pointers, while Jesse Govan finished with his 13th double-double of the season (18 points and 11 rebounds), Jahvon Blair scored 12 points, and Kaleb Johnson finished with 11, but Xavier outrebounded Georgetown 38–29, including 11–6 in offensive rebounds. Although the Musketeers′ leading scorer, senior guard Trevon Bluiett with 19.8 points per game, scored only two points – giving him a grand total of three points in his last two games at Capital One Arena – Xavier won 89–77, and for the second straight year, the Musketeers swept the season series with the Hoyas. Xavier improved its record to 8–2 against Georgetown since the two schools became charter members of the new Big East Conference in the 2013–2014 season. Georgetown, meanwhile, lost its seventh straight game against Top 25 teams dating back to the previous season, falling to 0–4 against them for the 2017–2018 season. The loss also guaranteed the Hoyas their third straight losing season in conference play.

The homestand continued with Georgetown losing its eighth straight game to Providence and losing in overtime to Marquette two days later in a game in which the Hoya defense gave up 18 three-pointers to the Golden Eagles. Jesse Govan scored the 1,000th point of his collegiate career and had a double-double (20 points and 11 rebounds) against Providence and finished with 25 points, nine rebounds, and five assists against Marquette. Marcus Derrickson had a double-double (11 points and 15 rebounds) against Providence and finished with 15 points in the Marquette game. Jamorko Pickett scored 12 against Providence, while Jagan Moseley came off the bench to score 12 against the Friars. Against the Golden Eagles, Jonathan Mulmore contributed 15 points and Jahvon Blair added 16 off the bench.

The Hoyas rounded out their regular season with a visit to No. 4 Villanova for their fifth and final game of the season against a ranked opponent. Marcus Derrickson, suffering from an injured right ankle, sat out the game. The Hoyas missed all nine of their three-point attempts in the first half and the Wildcats jumped out to a 15-point lead during the half that the Hoyas never really challenged. The teams went into the locker room at halftime with Villanova leading Georgetown 44–31, and Villanova cruised through the second half on the way to a 97–73 victory. The win was Jay Wright′s 413th as head coach of Villanova, tying him with Al Severance for the most wins as head coach in the school's history. Jesse Govan shot 10-for-15 from the field and 10-for-10 from the free-throw line to finish with 30 points, and Jamorko Pickett, the only other Hoya to score in double figures, added 10 points. The Hoyas finished in eighth place in the Big East with a conference record of 5–13, the first time they had finished with a losing conference record for three consecutive seasons since 1997–1998, 1998–1999, and 1999–2000. They completed the regular season with an overall record of 15–14.

=== Big East tournament ===
With a No. 8 seed in the 2018 Big East tournament at Madison Square Garden, Georgetown faced ninth-seeded St. John's in the first round. Both schools were charter members of the original Big East Conference when it was created in 1979, and it was their eighth meeting in the tournament since it began in 1980; it also was the second straight year that the schools had met in the first round of the Big East tournament. The Hoyas had swept the regular-season series with the Red Storm, but St. John's sophomore point guard Shamorie Ponds, who was the Big East's leading scorer with 26.1 points per game and had averaged 29 points during his last seven games but had missed the Red Storm's final two regular-season games with an abdominal strain, returned to action in time to face the Hoyas. Neither team defended well during the first half, and Georgetown led 48–42 at halftime, but in the second half the Red Storm's defense clamped down, allowing the Hoyas to shoot only 26 percent from the field after halftime. St. John's took the lead for good with an 8–0 scoring run that gave the Red Storm a 67–59 lead with 9:11 left to play. With a balanced attack led by Ponds's 26 points, St. John's shot 53 percent from the field for the game and the Hoyas never got closer than five points the rest of the way. Winning 88–77, St. John's upset the Hoyas, knocked Georgetown out of the Big East tournament in the first round for the second straight year, and advanced to face Xavier in the quarterfinals. Jesse Govan had a double-double (28 points and 11 rebounds), but scored only eight points in the second half, while Marcus Derrickson returned to action to score 20 points, but the other three Georgetown starters – Jamorko Pickett (two points), Jonathan Mulmore (four points) and Kaleb Johnson, who went scoreless – who were averaging a combined 23.8 points per game for the season entering the Big East tournament, contributed only a total of six points, shooting 1-for-11 (9.1 percent) from the field.

When reporters asked Ewing to reflect on the season in the immediate aftermath of the loss, he replied, "“Right now it's hard to reflect on it. I just have a bitter taste in my mouth right now. So I'm going to take a couple days and reflect. Depending on what happens, see if we're going to get a chance to continue to play and then reflect on it and see — and make that decision. But right now it's hard to say.”

=== Wrap-up ===
Georgetown's season ended with a five-game losing streak and an overall record of 15–15. For the third straight season, the Hoyas never made the Top 25 in either the Associated Press Poll or the Coaches Poll – the first time that had happened in three consecutive seasons since 1997-1998, 1998-1999, and 1999-2000. By winning half their games, the Hoyas avoided a third straight losing season, but it nonetheless was the first time Georgetown had three consecutive non-winning seasons since 1971–1972, 1972–1973, and 1973–1974. Having lost their last five games, nine of their last 11, and 11 of their last 14, the Hoyas were left to hope for a bid to the 2018 National Invitation Tournament – which Ewing said Georgetown would accept – but no invitation came; it was the first time the Hoyas had received an invitation to neither the NCAA Tournament or the NIT in three consecutive seasons since 1972, 1973 and 1974.

Jesse Govan was the team's leading scorer for the year; he started all 30 games, shooting 50.8 percent from the field, averaging 17.9 points and leading the team with 10.0 rebounds per game. Marcus Derrickson started all 29 games he played in, and he averaged 15.9 points and 8.1 rebounds per game, shooting 52.6 percent from the field overall and 46.5 percent from three-point range. Jamorko Pickett played in every game, starting 28 of them, shooting 36.3 percent in field-goal attempts and 35.7 percent from three-point range, and he averaged 9.6 points and 3.8 rebounds per game. Jahvon Blair played in all 30 games and started two of them, averaging 9.0 points per game on 33.2 percent field-goal shooting overall and 32.2 percent from three-point range, and he had 2.2 rebounds per game. Kaleb Johnson started all 30 games; he ended the season with a field-goal percentage of 54.2 – 34.0 from three-point range – and with per-game averages of 7.9 points and 4.2 rebounds. Jagan Moseley also played in every game and had one start, and he finished with 6.6 points and 2.8 rebounds per game, shooting 48.6 percent from the field and 38.9 percent from beyond the arc. Jonathan Mulmore started 29 of the 30 games he played in, and he averaged 5.6 points per game on 45.9 percent shooting from the field – 46.9 percent in three-point attempts – and grabbed 2.1 rebounds per game. Playing as a reserve in his only season as a Hoya, Trey Dickerson came off the bench in 27 games and averaged 4.4 points and 1.2 rebounds per game, shooting 42.7 percent overall and 27.5 percent in three-pointers. Antwan Walker made one start and came off the bench in 23 other games, averaging 2.7 points and 1.9 rebounds, and shot 49.0 percent from the field overall and 40.0 percent from three-point range. Before his dismissal, Chris Sodom appeared in six games, all as a reserve, and averaged 0.7 point and pulled down an average of 1.3 rebounds per game. Walk-ons Ra'Mond Hines and George Muresan each played in six games.

Jonathan Mulmore, Trey Dickerson, and Ra'Mond Hines all graduated in 2018. In his two seasons at Georgetown, Mulmore appeared in 62 games, starting 41, shooting 41.2 percent overall from the field and 41.0 percent from three-point range and averaging 4.6 points and 1.7 rebounds per game. In addition to his only year at Georgetown, Dickerson had played a season at Iowa and a season at South Dakota, and he finished his three-season college career having played in 76 games, starting 34 of them, shooting 40.3 percent from the field and 31.6 percent from three-point range and averaging 6.8 points and 1.5 rebounds per game. Hines, the Hoyas′ one-time student manager, had made the team for two seasons as a walk-on, playing a total of 22 minutes in 11 games, scoring three points and grabbing one rebound. Also graduating in 2018 was Tre Campbell, who had played guard as a freshman, sophomore, and junior on the Georgetown teams of 2014–15, 2015–16, and 2016–17, then left the team for "personal reasons" in August 2017. He remained enrolled at Georgetown and on scholarship during his senior year, sitting out the 2017-2018 basketball season with a year of college eligibility remaining. He announced on May 8, 2018, that after his graduation from Georgetown he would transfer to South Carolina where, as a graduate transfer, he would be eligible to begin play immediately in the 2018-2019 season.

Another player who left the team after the season was Marcus Derrickson. Talking to reporters at the end of the season-ending Big East tournament loss to St. John's, he had said he would return to Georgetown to play during his senior year, but he announced on April 9 that he instead had decided to forego his senior year of college and enter the 2018 NBA draft. He completed his three-season career at Georgetown having played in 89 games, starting 73 of them, averaging 10.3 points and 5.6 rebounds per game, and shooting 45.9 percent overall from the field and 39.7 percent in three-pointers. He went undrafted, but the Golden State Warriors signed him to play in the NBA Summer League. On April 11, Jesse Govan – who after the season's final game had, like Derrickson, declared an intention to return for his senior year – announced that he also would not return and would enter the NBA draft, raising the prospect of Georgetown losing two of its most experienced players and its top two scorers. However Govan did not hire an agent and, with his college eligibility therefore still intact, Georgetown announced on May 24 that he had withdrawn from the draft and would return for his senior year. Chris Sodom, dismissed from the team in December, decided to transfer to George Washington for the following season, a move which George Washington announced on May 30.

When the season ended, Georgetown's RPI stood at 165, below the lowest RPI for a 2018 NCAA Tournament team (16th-seeded Radford′s 128), and well below the second-lowest RPI in the Big East (Marquette's 58). The team had played five games against ranked opponents and lost all five of them, the first time Georgetown had not defeated any of its ranked opponents since the 2003–2004 season. During the season, Georgetown's backcourt had struggled, but the Hoya frontcourt had shown great promise, with Marcus Derrickson, Jesse Govan, and Jamorko Pickett all impressing sports media figures and fans with their offensive prowess. Beginning with the Syracuse game and extending through the Big East season, however, the 2017–18 Hoyas showed a tendency to surrender leads during the second halves of games and "looked nervous and unprepared in late-game situations;" in six of its 13 Big East losses, as well as in its non-conference loss to Syracuse, Georgetown had blown a second-half lead. Its five conference wins had not come easily, either; it had won only one game by more than four points, its two regular-season wins over ninth-place St. John's had been very close, and the Hoyas′ wins in conference play seemed "more about Georgetown surviving self-inflicted errors and hanging on for the victory than producing a good effort with solid play from start to finish." At least some observers blamed Georgetown's non-conference schedule for the team's apparent lack of preparedness for tough late-game situations and frequent inability to hold second-half leads. They also questioned the optics of Ewing's decision to opt out of the November PK80-Phil Knight Invitational and the lost opportunity to test the team against marquee opponents and signal Ewing's goal of rebuilding the team to national greatness that the withdrawal represented. Thus, the season ended as it began, centering around the narrative of the "historically weak" non-conference schedule Ewing had arranged.

However, the season also ended amid reports that Georgetown had noted the deleterious effects of too weak a schedule both on team preparedness for conference play and on NCAA Tournament selection possibilities and would schedule more challenging opponents for the following season, including an early-season tournament. With the likelihood of a stronger schedule and of further player development, the return of Jesse Govan, the upcoming eligibility of redshirt senior shooting guard Greg Malinowski, and the anticipated arrival of four highly rated freshman recruits – guard Mac McClung, point guard James Akinjo, and forwards Josh LeBlanc and Grayson Carter – sports pundits even saw a possibility of Georgetown returning to the NCAA Tournament in 2019.

== Roster ==
2017–18 Georgetown Hoyas men's basketball team
Players
Coaches

Pos.	#	Name	Height	Weight	Year	Previous school	Hometown
G	0	Jahvon Blair	6 ft 3 in (1.91 m)	189 lb (86 kg)	Fr	Orangeburg Prep	Mono, Ontario
F	1	Jamorko Pickett	6 ft 7 in (2.01 m)	190 lb (86 kg)	Fr	Massanutten Military Academy	Washington, D.C.
G	2	Jonathan Mulmore	6 ft 4 in (1.93 m)	185 lb (84 kg)	Sr	Redemption Christian Academy	New Orleans, Louisiana
G	4	Jagan Mosely	6 ft 3 in (1.91 m)	205 lb (93 kg)	So	St. Anthony's	Morganville, New Jersey
F	5	Antwan Walker	6 ft 9 in (2.06 m)	230 lb (104 kg)	Fr	Massanutten Military Academy	Washington, D.C.
G	10	Ra'Mond Hines (W)	6 ft 4 in (1.93 m)	175 lb (79 kg)	Sr	Gonzaga College High School	Washington, D.C.
G	11	Greg Malinowski (I) (redshirt)	6 ft 5 in (1.96 m)	215 lb (98 kg)	Sr	Episcopal High School; William & Mary	Chantilly, Virginia
C	12	Chris Sodom	7 ft 3 in (2.21 m)	220 lb (100 kg)	Fr	Tennessee Prep (Memphis)	Kaduna, Nigeria
G	13	Trey Dickerson	6 ft 0 in (1.83 m)	185 lb (84 kg)	RS Sr	God's Academy (Texas); South Dakota	Queens, New York
C	15	Jessie Govan	6 ft 10 in (2.08 m)	270 lb (122 kg)	Jr	Wings Academy	Queens Village, New York
F	20	George Muresan (W)	6 ft 9 in (2.06 m)	210 lb (95 kg)	So	St. Andrew's	Potomac, Maryland
F	24	Marcus Derrickson	6 ft 7 in (2.01 m)	250 lb (113 kg)	Jr	Brewster Academy	Bowie, Maryland
G/F	32	Kaleb Johnson	6 ft 6 in (1.98 m)	205 lb (93 kg)	Jr	Carlisle School	South Hill, Virginia
F	33	Trey Mourning (injured) (redshirt)	6 ft 9 in (2.06 m)	230 lb (104 kg)	Sr	Ransom Everglades School	Miami, Florida

Head coach

- Patrick Ewing (Georgetown)

Assistant coach(es)

- Louis Orr (Syracuse)
- Robert Kirby (Texas-Rio Grande Valley)
- Akbar Waheed (Niagara)

Legend

- (C) Team captain
- (S) Suspended
- (I) Ineligible
- (W) Walk-on
- Injured
- Current redshirt

Roster

Note: Chris Sodom was dismissed from the team in December 2017.

== Schedule and results ==
The Hoyas were originally announced as a participant in the Phil Knight Invitational, but withdrew from the highly anticipated event in early August.

Date time, TV	Rank^{#}	Opponent^{#}	Result	Record	High points	High rebounds	High assists	Site (attendance) city, state
Non-conference regular season
Nov 12, 2017*; 12:00 noon, FSN		Jacksonville	W 73–57	1–0	20 – Derrickson, Govan	15 – Govan	7 – Mulmore	Capital One Arena (9,212); Washington, D.C.
Nov 15, 2017*; 7:00 pm, FS2		Mount St. Mary's	W 102–68	2–0	20 – Govan	14 – Govan	5 – Blair, Moseley	Capital One Arena (5,064); Washington, D.C.
Nov 18, 2017; 12:00 noon, FSN		Maryland Eastern Shore	W 83–57	3–0	24 – Johnson	14 – Govan	5 – Mulmore	Capital One Arena (6,381); Washington, D.C.
Nov 25, 2017*; 6:00 pm, Stadium		at Richmond	W 82–76	4–0	16 – Derrickson	9 – Derrickson	8 – Mulmore	Robins Center (7,201); Richmond, VA
Nov 28, 2017*; 8:45 pm, FS1		Maine	W 76–55	5–0	18 – Johnson	8 – Govan	5 – Mulmore	Capital One Arena (4,029); Washington, D.C.
Dec 3, 2017*; 6:45 pm, FS1		Coppin State; BB&T Classic	W 76–60	6–0	26 – Govan	16 – Govan	5 – Mulmore, Johnson	Capital One Arena (6,335); Washington, D.C.
Dec 7, 2017*; 8:45 pm, FS1		Howard	W 81–67	7–0	24 – Govan	16 – Govan	4 – Derrickson, Johnson	Capital One Arena (4,543); Washington, D.C.
Dec 9, 2017*; 2:30 pm, FS2		North Carolina A&T	W 83–74	8–0	22 – Govan	15 – Govan	5 – Mulmore	Capital One Arena (5,127); Washington, D.C.
Dec 16, 2017*; 12:30 pm, CBS		Syracuse; Rivalry	L 79–86 ^{OT}	8–1	21 – Govan	8 – Derrickson, Govan	5 – Blair	Capital One Arena (15,418); Washington, D.C.
Dec 20, 2017*; 7:00 pm, FS2		North Texas	W 75–63	9–1	17 – Derrickson	14 – Govan	6 – Mulmore	Capital One Arena (4,226); Washington, D.C.
Dec 23, 2017*; 12:00 noon, FS1		Alabama A&M	W 89–49	10–1	16 – Walker	7 – Govan, Mosely	6 – Dickerson	Capital One Arena (5,149); Washington, D.C.
Big East regular season
Dec 27, 2017; 6:30 pm, FS1		Butler	L 89–91 ^{2OT}	10–2 (0–1)	23 – Derrickson	13 – Govan	5 – Mulmore	Capital One Arena (9,257); Washington, D.C.
Dec 30, 2017; 4:30 pm, FS1		at Marquette	L 65–74	10–3 (0–2)	20 – Derrickson	12 – Govan	4 – Johnson, Pickett	BMO Harris Bradley Center (14,889); Milwaukee, WI
Jan 2, 2018; 9:15 pm, FS1		at DePaul	W 90–81	11–3 (1–2)	25 – Govan	12 – Govan	5 – Govan	Wintrust Arena (5,190); Chicago, IL
Jan 6, 2018; 12:00 noon, FSN		Creighton	L 66–90	11–4 (1–3)	11 – Mosely	10 – Johnson	4 – Mosely	Capital One Arena (7,538); Washington, D.C.
Jan 9, 2018; 6:30 pm, FS1		at St. John's	W 69–66	12–4 (2–3)	18 – Govan	13 – Govan	5 – Mosley	Madison Square Garden (9,406); New York, NY
Jan 13, 2017; 12:00 noon, FS1		at No. 13 Seton Hall	L 61–74	12–5 (2–4)	18 – Derrickson	10 – Derrickson	4 – Mulmore	Prudential Center (10,481); Newark, NJ
Jan 17, 2018; 6:30 pm, FS1		No. 1 Villanova	L 56–88	12–6 (2–5)	12 – Govan	8 – Derrickson	4 – Derrickson, Mosely	Capital One Arena (11,905); Washington, D.C.
Jan 20, 2018; 12:00 noon, FS1		St. John's	W 93–89 ^{2OT}	13–6 (3–5)	27 – Derrickson	11 – Derrickson	7 – Mosely	Capital One Arena (8,976); Washington, D.C.
Jan 24, 2018; 8:45 pm, FS1		DePaul	L 73–74	13–7 (3–6)	23 – Derrickson	8 – Pickett	5 – Mosely	Capital One Arena (4,828); Washington, D.C.
Jan 27, 2018; 8:10 pm, CBSSN		at Creighton	L 77–85	13–8 (3–7)	21 – Blair	6 – Pickett	3 – Blair, Govan, Mulmore	CenturyLink Center (18,518); Omaha, NE
Feb 3, 2018; 6:10 pm, CBSSN		at No. 6 Xavier	L 91–96 ^{OT}	13–9 (3–8)	23 – Govan	15 – Derrickson	6 – Dickerson	Cintas Center (10,758); Cincinnati, OH
Feb 6, 2018; 8:45 pm, FS1		at Providence	L 69–73	13–10 (3–9)	27 – Govan	9 – Derrickson	3 – Pickett	Dunkin' Donuts Center (11,125); Providence, RI
Feb 10, 2018; 4:00 pm, CBSSN		Seton Hall	W 83–80	14–10 (4–9)	22 – Derrickson	18 – Derrickson	4 – Dickerson, Mosely, Mulmore	Capital One Arena (11,037); Washington, D.C.
Feb 13, 20178; 6:30 pm, CBSSN		at Butler	W 87–83	15–10 (5–9)	27 – Derrickson	12 – Govan	4 – Govan, Mulmore	Hinkle Fieldhouse (8,539); Indianapolis, IN
Feb 21, 2018; 6:30 pm, FS1		No. 4 Xavier	L 77–89	15–11 (5–10)	21 – Pickett	11 – Govan	6 – Mulmore	Capital One Arena (8,012); Washington, D.C.
Feb 24, 2018; 12:00 noon, CBSSN		Providence	L 69–74	15–12 (5–11)	20 – Govan	15 – Derrickson	6 – Dickerson	Capital One Arena (10,681); Washington, D.C.
Feb 26, 2018; 7:00 pm, FS1		Marquette	L 86–90 ^{OT}	15–13 (5–12)	25 – Govan	9 – Govan	5 – Govan	Capital One Arena (5,375); Washington, D.C.
Mar 3, 2018; 5:00 pm, FOX		at No. 4 Villanova	L 73–97	15–14 (5–13)	30 – Govan	8 – Govan	4 – Dickerson	Wells Fargo Center (18,523); Philadelphia, PA
Big East tournament
Mar 7, 2018; 7:00 pm, FS1	(8)	vs. (9) St. John's; First round	L 77–88	15–15	28 – Govan	11 – Govan	4 – Mulmore	Madison Square Garden (16,866); New York, NY
*Non-conference game. ^{#}Rankings from AP Poll. (#) Tournament seedings in parentheses. All times are in Eastern Time.

== Awards and honors ==
=== Big East Conference honors ===
Postseason honors
Honors	Player	Position	Date awarded	Ref.
All-Big East Second Team	Marcus Derrickson	F	March 4, 2018	
Big East All-Freshman Team	Jahvon Blair	G	March 4, 2018	
Big East All-Freshman Team	Jamorko Pickett	F	March 4, 2018	
