= 2017–18 Xavier Musketeers men's basketball team =

American college basketball season

2017–18 Xavier Musketeers men's basketball

Big East regular season champions

NCAA tournament, Second Round
- Conference: Big East Conference

Ranking
- Coaches: No. 8
- AP: No. 3
- Record: 29–6 (15–3 Big East)
- Head coach: Chris Mack (9th season)
- Assistant coaches: Travis Steele; Luke Murray; Mike Pegues
- Home arena: Cintas Center

2017–18 Big East men's basketball standings
	Conf.				Overall
Team	W		L	PCT	W		L	PCT
No. 3 Xavier	15	–	3	.833	29	–	6	.829
No. 2 Villanova †	14	–	4	.778	36	–	4	.900
Seton Hall	10	–	8	.556	22	–	12	.647
Creighton	10	–	8	.556	21	–	12	.636
Providence	10	–	8	.556	21	–	14	.600
Butler	9	–	9	.500	21	–	14	.600
Marquette	9	–	9	.500	21	–	14	.600
Georgetown	5	–	13	.278	15	–	15	.500
St. John's	4	–	14	.222	16	–	17	.485
DePaul	4	–	14	.222	11	–	20	.355
† 2018 Big East tournament winner Rankings from AP poll

The 2017–18 Xavier Musketeers men's basketball team represented Xavier University during the 2017–18 NCAA Division I men's basketball season as a member of the Big East Conference. Led by ninth-year head coach Chris Mack, they played their home games at the Cintas Center in Cincinnati, Ohio. They finished the season 29–6, 15–3 in Big East play to win the Big East championship. In the Big East tournament, they defeated St. John's before losing to Providence in the semifinals. They received an at-large bid to the NCAA tournament as a No. 1 seed in the West region. In the First Round, they defeated Texas Southern before being upset by Florida State in the Second Round.

On March 27, 2018, Chris Mack was hired as the new head coach of Louisville, leaving Xavier after nine seasons. Four days later, longtime assistant coach Travis Steele was named the new head coach of the Musketeers.

== Previous season ==
The Musketeers finished the 2016–17 season 24–14, 9–9 in Big East play to finish in seventh place. In the Big East tournament, they defeated DePaul and Butler before losing to Creighton in the semifinals. They received an at-large bid to the NCAA tournament as a No. 11 seed in the West region where they defeated Maryland, Florida State, and Arizona before losing in the Elite Eight to Gonzaga.

== Offseason ==
=== Returning players ===
On March 31, 2017, Trevon Bluiett announced he would declare for the NBA draft, but would not hire an agent. On May 23, he withdrew his name from the draft and announced he would return to Xavier for his senior season.

=== Incoming recruits ===
College recruiting
Name	Hometown	School	Height	Weight	Commit date
Elias Harden; SG	Tyrone, GA	Sandy Creek High School	6 ft 6 in (1.98 m)	175 lb (79 kg)	Jul 27, 2016
Elias Harden; SG	Recruit ratings: Scout: Rivals: 247Sports: (80)				
Naji Marshall; SF	Greenbelt, MD	Hargrave Military Academy	6 ft 6 in (1.98 m)	185 lb (84 kg)	Jul 29, 2016
Naji Marshall; SF	Recruit ratings: Scout: Rivals: 247Sports: (85)				
Paul Scruggs; PG	Indianapolis, IN	Prolific Prep	6 ft 4 in (1.93 m)	200 lb (91 kg)	Oct 14, 2016
Paul Scruggs; PG	Recruit ratings: Scout: Rivals: 247Sports:				
Overall recruit ranking:
Note: In many cases, Scout, Rivals, 247Sports, On3, and ESPN may conflict in their listings of height and weight.; In these cases, the average was taken. ESPN grades are on a 100-point scale.; Sources: "2017 Team Ranking". Rivals.

=== Incoming transfers ===
Name	Pos.	Height	Weight	Year	Hometown	Previous School	Years Remaining	Date Eligible
Kerem Kanter	Forward	6'10"	240	Senior	Istanbul, Turkey	Green Bay	1	Oct. 1, 2017

=== Future recruits ===
==== 2018 recruits ====
College recruiting (2018)
Name	Hometown	School	Height	Weight	Commit date
Jake Walter; C	Alexandria, KY	Covington Catholic High School	6 ft 10 in (2.08 m)	265 lb (120 kg)	Aug 18, 2017
Jake Walter; C	Recruit ratings: Scout: Rivals: 247Sports: ESPN:				
Keonte Kennedy; SG	Austin, TX	Westlake High School	6 ft 4 in (1.93 m)	175 lb (79 kg)	Oct 3, 2017
Keonte Kennedy; SG	Recruit ratings: Scout: Rivals: 247Sports: ESPN:				
Dontarius James; SF	Kershaw, SC	Andrew Jackson High School	6 ft 7 in (2.01 m)	215 lb (98 kg)	Nov 12, 2017
Dontarius James; SF	Recruit ratings: Scout: Rivals: 247Sports:				
Overall recruit ranking:
Note: In many cases, Scout, Rivals, 247Sports, On3, and ESPN may conflict in their listings of height and weight.; In these cases, the average was taken. ESPN grades are on a 100-point scale.; Sources: "2018 Xavier Commits". Rivals.; "2018 Team Ranking". Rivals.

== Preseason ==
In its annual preseason preview, Blue Ribbon Yearbook ranked the Musketeers No. 21 in the country. Trevon Bluiett was named a third team All-American.

In a poll of Big East coaches at the conference's media day, the Musketeers were picked to finish in third place in the Big East. Senior guard Trevon Bluiett was named to the preseason All-Big East First team while senior guard J.P. Macura was named a preseason All-Big East Honorable Mention.

== Roster ==
2017–18 Xavier Musketeers men's basketball team
Players
Coaches

Pos.	#	Name	Height	Weight	Year	Previous school	Hometown
F	0	Tyrique Jones	6 ft 9 in (2.06 m)	237 lb (108 kg)	So	Vermont Academy	Bloomfield, Connecticut
G	1	Paul Scruggs	6 ft 3 in (1.91 m)	212 lb (96 kg)	Fr	Prolific Prep (CA)	Indianapolis, Indiana
G	3	Quentin Goodin	6 ft 4 in (1.93 m)	194 lb (88 kg)	So	Taylor County HS	Campbellsville, Kentucky
G	4	Elias Harden	6 ft 5 in (1.96 m)	183 lb (83 kg)	Fr	Pebblebrook HS	East Point, Georgia
G	5	Trevon Bluiett	6 ft 6 in (1.98 m)	198 lb (90 kg)	Sr	Park Tudor School	Indianapolis, Indiana
G	10	Leighton Schrand (W)	6 ft 0 in (1.83 m)	155 lb (70 kg)	So	Holy Cross High School	Villa Hills, Kentucky
F	11	Kerem Kanter	6 ft 10 in (2.08 m)	240 lb (109 kg)	RS Sr	Green Bay	Istanbul, Turkey
G	12	Nick Vanderpohl (W)	6 ft 1 in (1.85 m)	170 lb (77 kg)	Fr	Harrison	Harrison, Ohio
F	13	Naji Marshall	6 ft 6 in (1.98 m)	214 lb (97 kg)	Fr	Hargrave Military Academy	Atlantic City, New Jersey
F	20	Matt Singleton (W)	6 ft 7 in (2.01 m)	215 lb (98 kg)	Sr	Garrett HS	Garrett, Indiana
F	22	Kaiser Gates	6 ft 8 in (2.03 m)	228 lb (103 kg)	Jr	St. Francis HS	Alpharetta, Georgia
F/C	54	Sean O'Mara	6 ft 10 in (2.08 m)	244 lb (111 kg)	Sr	Benet Academy	Glen Ellyn, Illinois
G	55	J. P. Macura	6 ft 5 in (1.96 m)	203 lb (92 kg)	Sr	Lakeville North HS	Lakeville, Minnesota

Head coach

- Chris Mack (Xavier)

Assistant coach(es)

- Travis Steele (Butler)
- Luke Murray (Fairfield)
- Mike Pegues (Delaware)

Legend

- (C) Team captain
- (S) Suspended
- (I) Ineligible
- (W) Walk-on
- Injured
- Current redshirt

Roster

== Schedule and results ==
Date time, TV	Rank^{#}	Opponent^{#}	Result	Record	High points	High rebounds	High assists	Site (attendance) city, state
Exhibition
Nov 4, 2017*; 4:00 pm	No. 17	Thomas More College	W 78–38		16 – Marshall	10 – Kanter	6 – Scruggs	Cintas Center (10,224); Cincinnati, OH
Non-conference regular season
Nov 10, 2017*; 7:00 pm, FSN	No. 17	Morehead State	W 101–49	1–0	25 – Bluiett	9 – Jones	7 – Goodin	Cintas Center (10,224); Cincinnati, OH
Nov 13, 2017*; 8:30 pm, FS1	No. 15	Rider; Las Vegas Invitational campus-site game	W 101–75	2–0	26 – Bluiett	9 – Bluiett	6 – Tied	Cintas Center (10,224); Cincinnati, OH
Nov 16, 2017*; 8:30 pm, FS1	No. 15	at Wisconsin; Gavitt Tipoff Games	W 80–70	3–0	25 – Bluiett	9 – Bluiett	6 – Goodin	Kohl Center (17,287); Madison, WI
Nov 20, 2017*; 8:30 pm, FS1	No. 15	Hampton; Las Vegas Invitational campus-site game	W 96–60	4–0	21 – Bluiett	9 – Gates	5 – Goodin	Cintas Center (10,224); Cincinnati, OH
Nov 23, 2017*; 5:00 pm, FS1	No. 15	vs. George Washington; Las Vegas Invitational semifinals	W 83–64	5–0	20 – Bluiett	11 – Jones	4 – Goodin	Orleans Arena; Paradise, NV
Nov 24, 2017*; 5:30 pm, FOX	No. 15	vs. Arizona State; Las Vegas Invitational championship	L 86–102	5–1	23 – Macura	5 – Tied	6 – Tied	Orleans Arena; Paradise, NV
Nov 28, 2017*; 6:30 pm, FS1	No. 21	No. 16 Baylor	W 76–63	6–1	19 – Tied	7 – Jones	6 – Tied	Cintas Center (10,503); Cincinnati, OH
Dec 2, 2017*; 12:00 pm, FS1	No. 21	No. 11 Cincinnati; Skyline Chili Crosstown Shootout	W 89–76	7–1	28 – Bluiett	10 – Gates	8 – Goodin	Cintas Center (10,817); Cincinnati, OH
Dec 6, 2017*; 7:00 pm, FS1	No. 13	Kent State	W 96–70	8–1	26 – Bluiett	8 – Kanter	6 – Goodin	Cintas Center (10,292); Cincinnati, OH
Dec 9, 2017*; 5:00 pm, FS1	No. 13	Colorado	W 96–69	9–1	25 – Bluiett	7 – Tied	8 – Goodin	Cintas Center (10,228); Cincinnati, OH
Dec 16, 2017*; 2:00 pm, FSN	No. 10	East Tennessee State	W 68–66	10–1	18 – Bluiett	7 – Tied	6 – Goodin	Cintas Center (10,432); Cincinnati, OH
Dec 19, 2017*; 6:30 pm, FS1	No. 9	Marshall	W 81–77	11–1	16 – Kanter	13 – Kanter	4 – Marshall	Cintas Center (10,431); Cincinnati, OH
Dec 22, 2017*; 9:00 pm, CBSSN	No. 9	at Northern Iowa	W 77–67	12–1	15 – Macura	9 – Gates	5 – Goodin	McLeod Center (6,355); Cedar Falls, IA
Big East regular season
Dec 27, 2017; 8:30 pm, FS1	No. 6	at Marquette	W 91–87	13–1 (1–0)	23 – Bluiett	6 – Bluiett	8 – Bluiett	BMO Harris Bradley Center (15,095); Milwaukee, WI
Dec 30, 2017; 2:00 pm, FS1	No. 6	DePaul	W 77–72	14–1 (2–0)	19 – Macura	7 – Tied	5 – Macura	Cintas Center (10,436); Cincinnati, OH
Jan 2, 2018; 7:00 pm, FS1	No. 5	Butler	W 86–79	15–1 (3–0)	21 – Bluiett	9 – Jones	4 – Macura	Cintas Center (10,609); Cincinnati, OH
Jan 6, 2018; 12:00 pm, FOX	No. 5	at Providence	L 72–81	15–2 (3–1)	24 – Kanter	12 – Kanter	4 – Tied	Dunkin' Donuts Center (12,630); Providence, RI
Jan 10, 2018; 8:00 pm, FS1	No. 10	at No. 1 Villanova	L 65–89	15–3 (3–2)	16 – Kanter	5 – Kanter	3 – Tied	Wells Fargo Center (12,765); Philadelphia, PA
Jan 13, 2018; 2:00 pm, FOX	No. 10	No. 25 Creighton	W 92–70	16–3 (4–2)	22 – Bluiett	8 – Tied	6 – Goodin	Cintas Center (10,655); Cincinnati, OH
Jan 17, 2018; 8:30 pm, CBSSN	No. 11	St. John's	W 88–82	17–3 (5–2)	23 – Bluiett	13 – Kanter	7 – Goodin	Cintas Center (10,224); Cincinnati, OH
Jan 20, 2018; 2:30 pm, FOX	No. 11	at No. 19 Seton Hall	W 73–64	18–3 (6–2)	27 – Macura	5 – Tied	5 – Scruggs	Prudential Center (10,481); Newark, NJ
Jan 24, 2018; 6:30 pm, FS1	No. 8	Marquette	W 89–70	19–3 (7–2)	15 – Goodin	10 – Bluiett	5 – Tied	Cintas Center (10,493); Cincinnati, OH
Jan 30, 2018; 8:30 pm, CBSSN	No. 6	at St. John's	W 73–68	20–3 (8–2)	14 – Bluiett	6 – Gates	5 – Goodin	Carnesecca Arena (5,344); Queens, NY
Feb 3, 2018; 6:10 pm, CBSSN	No. 6	Georgetown	W 96–91 ^{OT}	21–3 (9–2)	31 – Bluiett	10 – Gates	4 – Gates	Cintas Center (10,758); Cincinnati, OH
Feb 6, 2018; 6:30 pm, FS1	No. 5	at Butler	W 98–93 ^{OT}	22–3 (10–2)	26 – Bluiett	6 – Tied	3 – Tied	Hinkle Fieldhouse (9,100); Indianapolis, IN
Feb 10, 2018; 2:30 pm, FOX	No. 5	at Creighton	W 72–71	23–3 (11–2)	17 – Goodin	9 – Macura	4 – Bluiett	CenturyLink Center (18,257); Omaha, NE
Feb 14, 2018; 9:00 pm, FS1	No. 4	Seton Hall	W 102–90	24–3 (12–2)	37 – Bluiett	7 – Bluiett	5 – Macura	Cintas Center (10,512); Cincinnati, OH
Feb 17, 2018; 4:30 pm, FOX	No. 4	No. 3 Villanova	L 79–95	24–4 (12–3)	26 – Bluiett	8 – Marshall	12 – Goodin	Cintas Center (10,777); Cincinnati, OH
Feb 21, 2018; 6:30 pm, FS1	No. 4	at Georgetown	W 89–77	25–4 (13–3)	21 – Marshall	7 – Tied	4 – Tied	Capital One Arena (8,012); Washington, DC
Feb 28, 2018; 6:30 pm, FS1	No. 3	Providence	W 84–74	26–4 (14–3)	23 – Bluiett	6 – Bluiett	4 – Goodin	Cintas Center (10,715); Cincinnati, OH
Mar 3, 2018; 12:00 pm, FS1	No. 3	at DePaul	W 65–62	27–4 (15–3)	22 – Bluiett	11 – Marshall	4 – Macura	Wintrust Arena (7,972); Chicago, IL
Big East tournament
Mar 8, 2018; 12:00 pm, FS1	(1) No. 3	vs. (9) St. John's; Quarterfinals	W 88–60	28–4	27 – Bluiett	7 – Bluiett/Marshall	5 – Macura	Madison Square Garden (17,647); New York, NY
Mar 9, 2018; 6:30 pm, FS1	(1) No. 3	vs. (5) Providence; Semifinals	L 72–75	28–5	18 – Kanter	12 – Marshall	3 – Tied	Madison Square Garden (19,812); New York, NY
NCAA tournament
Mar 16, 2018*; 7:20 pm, TBS	(1 W) No. 3	vs. (16 W) Texas Southern; First Round	W 102–83	29–5	29 – Macura	6 – Tied	7 – Goodin	Bridgestone Arena (17,549); Nashville, TN
Mar 18, 2018; 8:40 pm, TNT	(1 W) No. 3	vs. (9 W) Florida State; Second Round	L 70–75	29–6	17 – Macura	6 – Kanter	2 – 3 tied	Bridgestone Arena (17,552); Nashville, TN
*Non-conference game. ^{#}Rankings from AP Poll. (#) Tournament seedings in parentheses. W=West. All times are in Eastern Time.

== Rankings ==
Ranking movements Legend: ██ Increase in ranking ██ Decrease in ranking ( ) = First-place votes
	Week																			
Poll	Pre	1	2	3	4	5	6	7	8	9	10	11	12	13	14	15	16	17	18	Final
AP	17	15	15	21	13	10	9	6	5	10	11	8	6	5	4 (5)	4	3	3	3	Not released
Coaches	17	17	14	20	14	9	8	5	4	10	12	8	6	5	4 (1)	4	4	2	4	8

- AP does not release post-NCAA tournament rankings
