= 2017–18 Villanova Wildcats men's basketball team =

American college basketball season

2017–18 Villanova Wildcats men's basketball

NCAA tournament National Champions Big East tournament champions Philadelphia Big 5 champions Battle 4 Atlantis champions

National Championship Game, W 79–62 vs. Michigan
- Conference: Big East Conference

Ranking
- Coaches: No. 1
- AP: No. 2
- Record: 36–4 (14–4 Big East)
- Head coach: Jay Wright (17th season)
- Assistant coaches: George Halcovage; Ashley Howard; Kyle Neptune
- Home arena: Wells Fargo Center

2017–18 Big East men's basketball standings
	Conf.				Overall
Team	W		L	PCT	W		L	PCT
No. 3 Xavier	15	–	3	.833	29	–	6	.829
No. 2 Villanova †	14	–	4	.778	36	–	4	.900
Seton Hall	10	–	8	.556	22	–	12	.647
Creighton	10	–	8	.556	21	–	12	.636
Providence	10	–	8	.556	21	–	14	.600
Butler	9	–	9	.500	21	–	14	.600
Marquette	9	–	9	.500	21	–	14	.600
Georgetown	5	–	13	.278	15	–	15	.500
St. John's	4	–	14	.222	16	–	17	.485
DePaul	4	–	14	.222	11	–	20	.355
† 2018 Big East tournament winner Rankings from AP poll

The 2017–18 Villanova Wildcats men's basketball team represented Villanova University in the 2017–18 NCAA Division I men's basketball season. Led by head coach Jay Wright in his 17th year, the Wildcats played their home games at the Wells Fargo Center in Philadelphia, Pennsylvania as members of the Big East Conference.

The Wildcats finished the season 36–4, 14–4 in Big East play to finish in second place. They defeated Marquette, Butler, and Providence to win the Big East tournament championship. As a result, they received the conference's automatic bid to the NCAA tournament as the No. 1 seed in the East region, their third No.1 seed in four years. They defeated Radford, Alabama, West Virginia, and Texas Tech to advance to the Final Four for the second time in three years. In the National Semifinal, they defeated Kansas before defeating Michigan in the National Championship game to win their second national championship in three years. They won every game of the tournament by a double-digit margin and the team's tournament run is widely considered one of the most dominant ever along with being called among the best seasons of all time.

The Wildcats' home court, The Pavilion, underwent a temporary closure for a $60 million renovation project during the season. It reopened for the 2018–19 season with the new name of Finneran Pavilion after a Villanova alum who donated $22.6 million to Villanova. Accordingly, all home games for the 2017–18 season but one were played at the Wells Fargo Center. The exception was the November 29, 2017 game with Big 5 rival Penn; it was instead held at Jake Nevin Field House, which had been home to the team before the Pavilion's initial 1986 opening.

== Previous season ==
The Wildcats finished the 2016–17 season 32–4, 15–3 in Big East play to win the regular season championship. In the Big East tournament, they defeated St. John's, Seton Hall, and Creighton to win the tournament championship. As a result, they received the conference's automatic bid to the NCAA tournament. The Wildcats were given the Tournament's overall No. 1 seed as a No. 1 seed in the East region. In the First Round they defeated Mount St. Mary's before being upset by No. 8-seeded Wisconsin in the Second Round. The loss marked the second time in the previous three tournaments that Villanova was upset by an eighth-seeded team.

== Offseason ==
=== Departures ===
Name	Number	Pos.	Height	Weight	Year	Hometown	Notes
Kris Jenkins	2	F	6'6"	235	SR	Upper Marlboro, Maryland	Graduated
Josh Hart	3	G	6'5"	215	SR	Silver Spring, Maryland	Graduated

=== 2017 recruiting class ===
College recruiting information
Name	Hometown	School	Height	Weight	Commit date
Dhamir Cosby-Roundtree; PF	Philadelphia, PA	Neumann-Goretti High School	6 ft 9 in (2.06 m)	215 lb (98 kg)	Apr 5, 2016
Dhamir Cosby-Roundtree; PF	Recruit ratings: Scout: Rivals: 247Sports: ESPN: (81)				
Jermaine Samuels; SF	Franklin, MA	The Rivers School	6 ft 6 in (1.98 m)	190 lb (86 kg)	Aug 27, 2016
Jermaine Samuels; SF	Recruit ratings: Scout: Rivals: 247Sports: ESPN: (86)				
Collin Gillespie; PG	Warminster, PA	Archbishop Wood Catholic High School	6 ft 2 in (1.88 m)	180 lb (82 kg)	Jan 14, 2017
Collin Gillespie; PG	Recruit ratings: Scout: Rivals: 247Sports: ESPN: (64)				
Overall recruit ranking:
Note: In many cases, Scout, Rivals, 247Sports, On3, and ESPN may conflict in their listings of height and weight.; In these cases, the average was taken. ESPN grades are on a 100-point scale.; Sources: "2017 Team Ranking". Rivals.

=== Future recruits ===
==== 2018 recruiting class ====
College recruiting information (2018)
Name	Hometown	School	Height	Weight	Commit date
Brandon Slater; SG	Fairfax, Virginia	Paul VI Catholic High School	6 ft 6 in (1.98 m)	180 lb (82 kg)	May 24, 2017
Brandon Slater; SG	Recruit ratings: Scout: Rivals: 247Sports: ESPN:				
Cole Swider; SF	Barrington, RI	St. Andrew's School	6 ft 7 in (2.01 m)	210 lb (95 kg)	May 24, 2017
Cole Swider; SF	Recruit ratings: Scout: Rivals: 247Sports: ESPN:				
Jahvon Quinerly; PG	Jersey City, NJ	Hudson Catholic High School	6 ft 0 in (1.83 m)	170 lb (77 kg)	Feb 14, 2018
Jahvon Quinerly; PG	Recruit ratings: Scout: Rivals: 247Sports: ESPN:				
Overall recruit ranking:
Note: In many cases, Scout, Rivals, 247Sports, On3, and ESPN may conflict in their listings of height and weight.; In these cases, the average was taken. ESPN grades are on a 100-point scale.; Sources: "2018 Villanova Commits". Rivals.; "2018 Team Ranking". Rivals.

== Preseason ==
In its annual preseason preview, Blue Ribbon Yearbook ranked the Wildcats No. 12 in the country. Jalen Brunson was named a third team preseason All-American.

Villanova was picked to win the Big East in the conference's preseason Coaches' Poll for the fourth consecutive year. Jalen Brunson was named the unanimous preseason All-Big East player of the year.

== Roster ==
2017–18 Villanova Wildcats men's basketball team
Players
Coaches

Pos.	#	Name	Height	Weight	Year	Previous school	Hometown
G	1	Jalen Brunson	6 ft 3 in (1.91 m)	190 lb (86 kg)	Jr	Stevenson High School	Lincolnshire, IL
G	2	Collin Gillespie	6 ft 3 in (1.91 m)	190 lb (86 kg)	Fr	Archbishop Wood	Warminster, PA
F	4	Eric Paschall	6 ft 6 in (1.98 m)	255 lb (116 kg)	RS Jr	Fordham	Dobbs Ferry, NY
G	5	Phil Booth	6 ft 3 in (1.91 m)	190 lb (86 kg)	RS Jr	Mount Saint Joseph High School	Baltimore, MD
G	10	Donte DiVincenzo	6 ft 5 in (1.96 m)	205 lb (93 kg)	RS So	Salesianum School	Wilmington, DE
F	14	Omari Spellman	6 ft 9.5 in (2.07 m)	245 lb (111 kg)	RS Fr	St. Thomas More School (CT)	North Royalton, OH
F	21	Dhamir Cosby-Roundtree	6 ft 9 in (2.06 m)	220 lb (100 kg)	RS Fr	Neumann–Goretti	Philadelphia, PA
G	22	Peyton Heck	5 ft 11 in (1.8 m)	175 lb (79 kg)	Jr	Archmere Academy	Wilmington, DE
F	23	Jermaine Samuels	6 ft 5 in (1.96 m)	225 lb (102 kg)	Fr	The Rivers School	Franklin, MA
F	24	Tom Leibig	6 ft 4 in (1.93 m)	195 lb (88 kg)	Sr	Haverford High School	Havertown, PA
G/F	25	Mikal Bridges	6 ft 7 in (2.01 m)	210 lb (95 kg)	RS Jr	Great Valley High School	Malvern, PA
F	34	Tim Delaney	6 ft 9 in (2.06 m)	230 lb (104 kg)	RS So	Blair Academy	Mullica Hill, NJ
G	35	Matt Kennedy	6 ft 2 in (1.88 m)	175 lb (79 kg)	Sr	Flint Hill School	Fairfax, VA
G	40	Denny Grace	5 ft 11 in (1.8 m)	175 lb (79 kg)	GS	Calvert Hall College High School	Catonsville, MD
F	42	Dylan Painter	6 ft 9 in (2.06 m)	245 lb (111 kg)	So	Hershey High School	Hershey, PA

Head coach

- Jay Wright (Bucknell)

Assistant coach(es)

- Ashley Howard (Drexel)
- Kyle Neptune (Lehigh)
- George Halcovage (Babson)

Legend

- (C) Team captain
- (S) Suspended
- (I) Ineligible
- (W) Walk-on
- Injured
- Current redshirt

Roster

== Schedule and results ==
Date time, TV	Rank^{#}	Opponent^{#}	Result	Record	High points	High rebounds	High assists	Site (attendance) city, state
Exhibition
November 1, 2017*; 9:00 pm	No. 6	Drexel; Puerto Rico Hurricane Relief Exhibition	W 87–68		16 – Brunson	12 – Spellman	6 – Brunson	Jake Nevin Field House; Villanova, PA
Regular season
November 10, 2017*; 8:30 pm, FS2	No. 6	Columbia	W 75–60	1–0	15 – Paschall	11 – Spellman	3 – Tied	Wells Fargo Center (10,504); Philadelphia, PA
November 14, 2017*; 6:30 pm, FS1	No. 5	Nicholls State; Battle 4 Atlantis Mainland game	W 113–77	2–0	23 – Bridges	6 – 4 tied	5 – Tied	Wells Fargo Center (8,517); Philadelphia, PA
November 17, 2017*; 8:00 pm, FS2	No. 5	vs. Lafayette; Allentown Showcase	W 104–57	3–0	24 – Bridges	9 – Spellman	6 – Brunson	PPL Center (6,652); Allentown, PA
November 22, 2017*; 2:30 pm, ESPN2	No. 4	vs. Western Kentucky; Battle 4 Atlantis quarterfinal	W 66–58	4–0	18 – Brunson	8 – 2 Tied	3 – 3 Tied	Imperial Arena (1,199); Nassau, Bahamas
November 23, 2017*; 12:30 pm, ESPN	No. 5	vs. Tennessee; Battle 4 Atlantis semifinal	W 85–76	5–0	25 – Brunson	6 – Paschall	6 – Brunson	Imperial Arena (2,102); Nassau, Bahamas
November 24, 2017*; 12:00 pm, ESPN2	No. 5	vs. Northern Iowa; Battle 4 Atlantis championship	W 64–50	6–0	18 – Bridges	7 – Bridges	4 – Brunson	Imperial Arena (2,831); Nassau, Bahamas
November 29, 2017*; 7:00 pm, FS2	No. 4	Penn; Big 5	W 90–62	7–0	17 – Brunson	7 – 2 Tied	4 – 2 Tied	Jake Nevin Field House (2,200); Villanova, PA
December 2, 2017*; 5:30 pm, ESPN2	No. 4	at Saint Joseph's; Big 5 / Holy War	W 94–53	8–0	18 – Bridges	11 – Spellman	6 – Tied	Hagan Arena (4,200); Philadelphia, PA
December 5, 2017*; 7:00 pm, ESPN	No. 4	vs. No. 12 Gonzaga; Jimmy V Classic	W 88–72	9–0	28 – Bridges	8 – Spellman	3 – Tied	Madison Square Garden (17,532); New York, NY
December 10, 2017*; 1:00 pm, FS1	No. 4	La Salle; Big 5	W 77–68	10–0	18 – Tied	10 – DiVincenzo	7 – Brunson	Wells Fargo Center (10,611); Philadelphia, PA
December 13, 2017*; 7:00 pm, ESPN2	No. 1	at Temple; Big 5	W 87–67	11–0	31 – Brunson	8 – Spellman	5 – Brunson	Liacouras Center (10,206); Philadelphia, PA
December 22, 2017*; 8:30 pm, FS1	No. 1	vs. Hofstra; Long Island Showcase	W 95–71	12–0	20 – Bridges	10 – Spellman	7 – Brunson	Nassau Veterans Memorial Coliseum (7,892); Uniondale, NY
December 27, 2017; 7:30 pm, CBSSN	No. 1	at DePaul	W 103–85	13–0 (1–0)	20 – Bridges	12 – Spellman	6 – Booth	Wintrust Arena (8,323); Chicago, IL
December 30, 2017; 4:00 pm, CBS	No. 1	at Butler	L 93–101	13–1 (1–1)	31 – Brunson	9 – Spellman	5 – Brunson	Hinkle Fieldhouse (9,244); Indianapolis, IN
January 6, 2018; 8:00 pm, FS1	No. 3	Marquette	W 100–90	14–1 (2–1)	27 – Brunson	7 – Bridges	8 – Brunson	Wells Fargo Center (14,210); Philadelphia, PA
January 10, 2018; 8:00 pm, FS1	No. 1	No. 10 Xavier	W 89–65	15–1 (3–1)	21 – Booth	9 – Bridges	5 – Brunson	Wells Fargo Center (12,765); Philadelphia, PA
January 13, 2018; 8:00 pm, FBN	No. 1	at St. John's	W 78–71	16–1 (4–1)	25 – DiVincenzo	11 – Bridges	5 – Brunson	Madison Square Garden (17,123); New York, NY
January 17, 2018; 6:30 pm, FS1	No. 1	at Georgetown	W 88–56	17–1 (5–1)	18 – Brunson	7 – DiVincenzo	7 – Brunson	Capital One Arena (11,905); Washington, DC
January 20, 2018*; 12:00 pm, CBS	No. 1	at UConn	W 81–61	18–1	23 – Brunson	12 – Spellman	6 – Booth	XL Center (15,564); Hartford, CT
January 23, 2018; 6:30 pm, FS1	No. 1	Providence	W 89–69	19–1 (6–1)	17 – Paschall	9 – Bridges	5 – Paschall	Wells Fargo Center (8,595); Philadelphia, PA
January 28, 2018; 1:00 pm, FOX	No. 1	at Marquette	W 85–82	20–1 (7–1)	31 – Brunson	9 – Paschall	2 – Tied	BMO Harris Bradley Center (17,120); Milwaukee, WI
February 1, 2018; 12:00 pm, FS1	No. 1	Creighton	W 98–78	21–1 (8–1)	21 – Bridges	8 – Paschall	5 – Tied	Wells Fargo Center (10,225); Philadelphia, PA
February 4, 2018; 12:00 pm, FOX	No. 1	Seton Hall	W 92–76	22–1 (9–1)	26 – Spellman	11 – Spellman	7 – DiVincenzo	Wells Fargo Center (16,115); Philadelphia, PA
February 7, 2018; 7:00 pm, CBSSN	No. 1	St. John's	L 75–79	22–2 (9–2)	28 – Brunson	12 – Spellman	3 – Tied	Wells Fargo Center (10,900); Philadelphia, PA
February 10, 2018; 12:00 pm, FOX	No. 1	Butler	W 86–75	23–2 (10–2)	30 – DiVincenzo	11 – Spellman	5 – Bridges	Wells Fargo Center (20,603); Philadelphia, PA
February 14, 2018; 7:00 pm, FS1	No. 3	at Providence	L 71–76	23–3 (10–3)	19 – Bridges	9 – Spellman	5 – Brunson	Dunkin' Donuts Center (12,887); Providence, RI
February 17, 2018; 4:30 pm, FOX	No. 3	at No. 4 Xavier	W 95–79	24–3 (11–3)	25 – Bridges	9 – DiVincenzo	9 – DiVincenzo	Cintas Center (10,777); Cincinnati, OH
February 21, 2018; 8:30 pm, FS1	No. 3	DePaul	W 93–62	25–3 (12–3)	27 – Bridges	7 – Spellman	7 – Brunson	Wells Fargo Center (10,007); Philadelphia, PA
February 24, 2018; 2:30 pm, FOX	No. 3	at Creighton	L 83–89 ^{OT}	25–4 (12–4)	22 – Brunson	10 – Spellman	5 – Brunson	CenturyLink Center (18,321); Omaha, NE
February 28, 2018; 8:30 pm, FS1	No. 4	at Seton Hall	W 69–68 ^{OT}	26–4 (13–4)	23 – Bridges	14 – Spellman	5 – DiVincenzo	Prudential Center (13,711); Newark, NJ
March 3, 2018; 5:00 pm, FOX	No. 4	Georgetown	W 97–73	27–4 (14–4)	24 – Bridges	6 – Tied	7 – Brunson	Wells Fargo Center (18,523); Philadelphia, PA
Big East tournament
March 8, 2018; 7:00 pm, FS1	(2) No. 2	vs. (7) Marquette; Quarterfinal	W 94–70	28–4	25 – Bridges	8 – Bridges	4 – Bridges	Madison Square Garden (19,812); New York, NY
March 9, 2018; 10:00 pm, FS1	(2) No. 2	vs. (6) Butler; Semifinal	W 87–68	29–4	18 – Bridges	12 – Spellman	6 – DiVincenzo	Madison Square Garden (19,812); New York, NY
March 10, 2018; 6:30 pm, FOX	(2) No. 2	vs. (5) Providence; Championship	W 76–66 ^{OT}	30–4	31 – Brunson	13 – Paschall	4 – Brunson	Madison Square Garden (19,812); New York, NY
NCAA tournament
March 15, 2018*; 6:50 pm, TNT	(1 E) No. 2	vs. (16 E) Radford; First round	W 87–61	31–4	16 – Brunson	7 – Spellman	8 – DiVincenzo	PPG Paints Arena (18,715); Pittsburgh, PA
March 17, 2018*; 12:10 pm, CBS	(1 E) No. 2	vs. (9 E) Alabama; Second round	W 81–58	32–4	23 – Bridges	8 – Spellman	5 – DiVincenzo	PPG Paints Arena (19,015); Pittsburgh, PA
March 23, 2018*; 7:27 pm, TBS	(1 E) No. 2	vs. (5 E) No. 15 West Virginia; Sweet Sixteen	W 90–78	33–4	27 – Brunson	8 – Spellman	4 – Tied	TD Garden (19,055); Boston, MA
March 25, 2018*; 2:20 pm, CBS	(1 E) No. 2	vs. (3 E) No. 14 Texas Tech; Elite Eight	W 71–59	34–4	15 – Brunson	14 – Paschall	4 – Brunson	TD Garden (19,169); Boston, MA
March 31, 2018*; 7:49 pm, TBS	(1 E) No. 2	vs. (1 MW) No. 4 Kansas; Final Four	W 95–79	35–4	24 – Paschall	13 – Spellman	6 – Tied	Alamodome (68,257); San Antonio, TX
April 2, 2018*; 9:20 pm, TBS	(1 E) No. 2	vs. (3 W) No. 8 Michigan; National Championship	W 79–62	36–4	31 – DiVincenzo	11 – Spellman	3 – DiVincenzo	Alamodome (67,831); San Antonio, TX
*Non-conference game. ^{#}Rankings from AP Poll. (#) Tournament seedings in parentheses. E=East MW=Midwest. All times are in Eastern Time.

== Rankings ==
Ranking movements Legend: ██ Increase in ranking ██ Decrease in ranking ( ) = First-place votes
	Week																			
Poll	Pre	1	2	3	4	5	6	7	8	9	10	11	12	13	14	15	16	17	18	Final
AP	6	5	5	4	4	1 (41)	1 (45)	1 (43)	3 (1)	1 (25)	1 (63)	1 (63)	1 (47)	1 (48)	3 (9)	3 (4)	4	2	2	Not released
Coaches	6	6^	3 (1)	4	4	1 (22)	1 (26)	1 (27)	3 (1)	1 (27)	1 (31)	1 (31)	1 (22)	1 (22)	2 (8)	3 (4)	5	3	2	1 (32)

^Coaches Poll did not release a Week 2 poll at the same time AP did.
*AP does not release post-NCAA tournament rankings

== Gallery ==
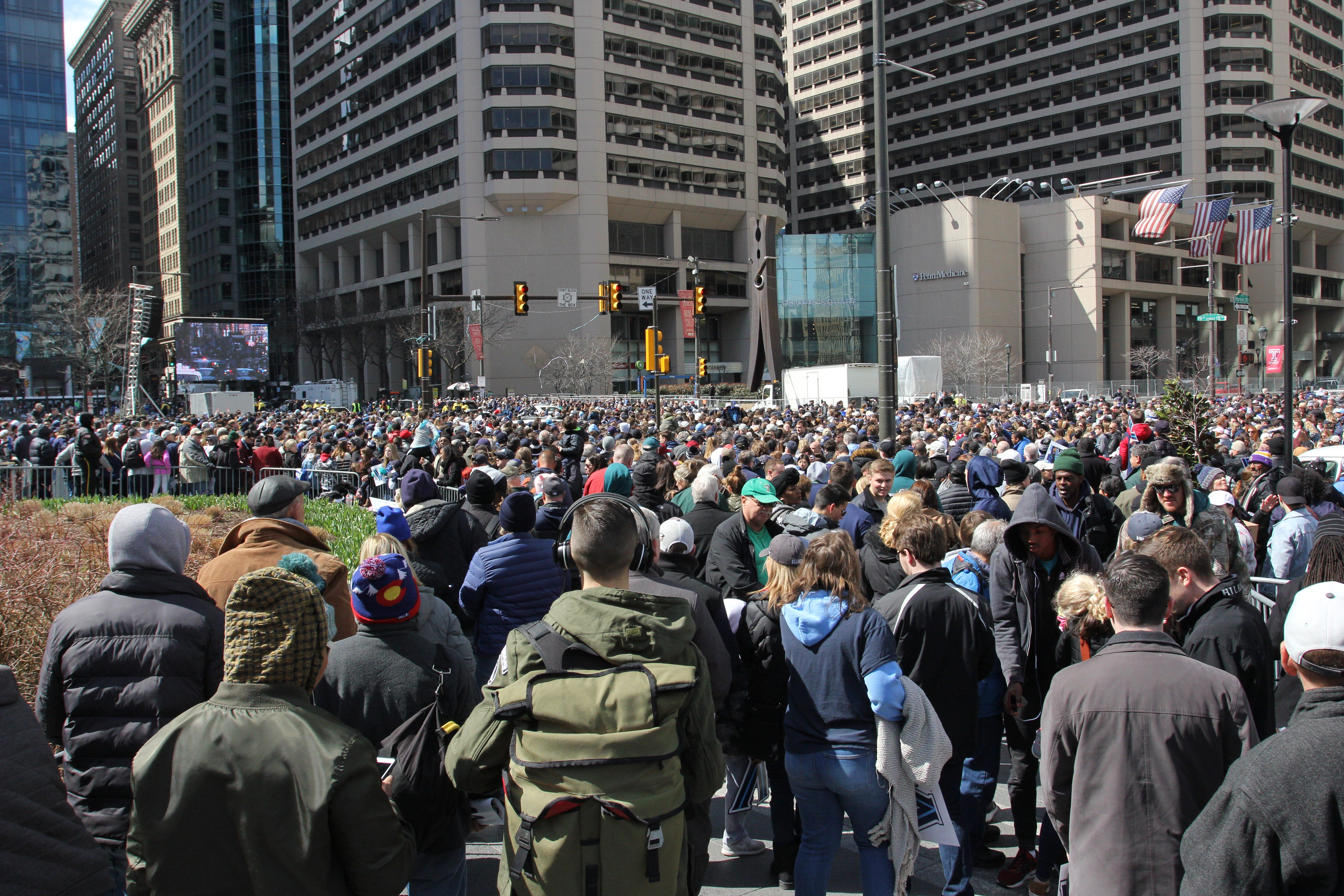
Crowd at parade

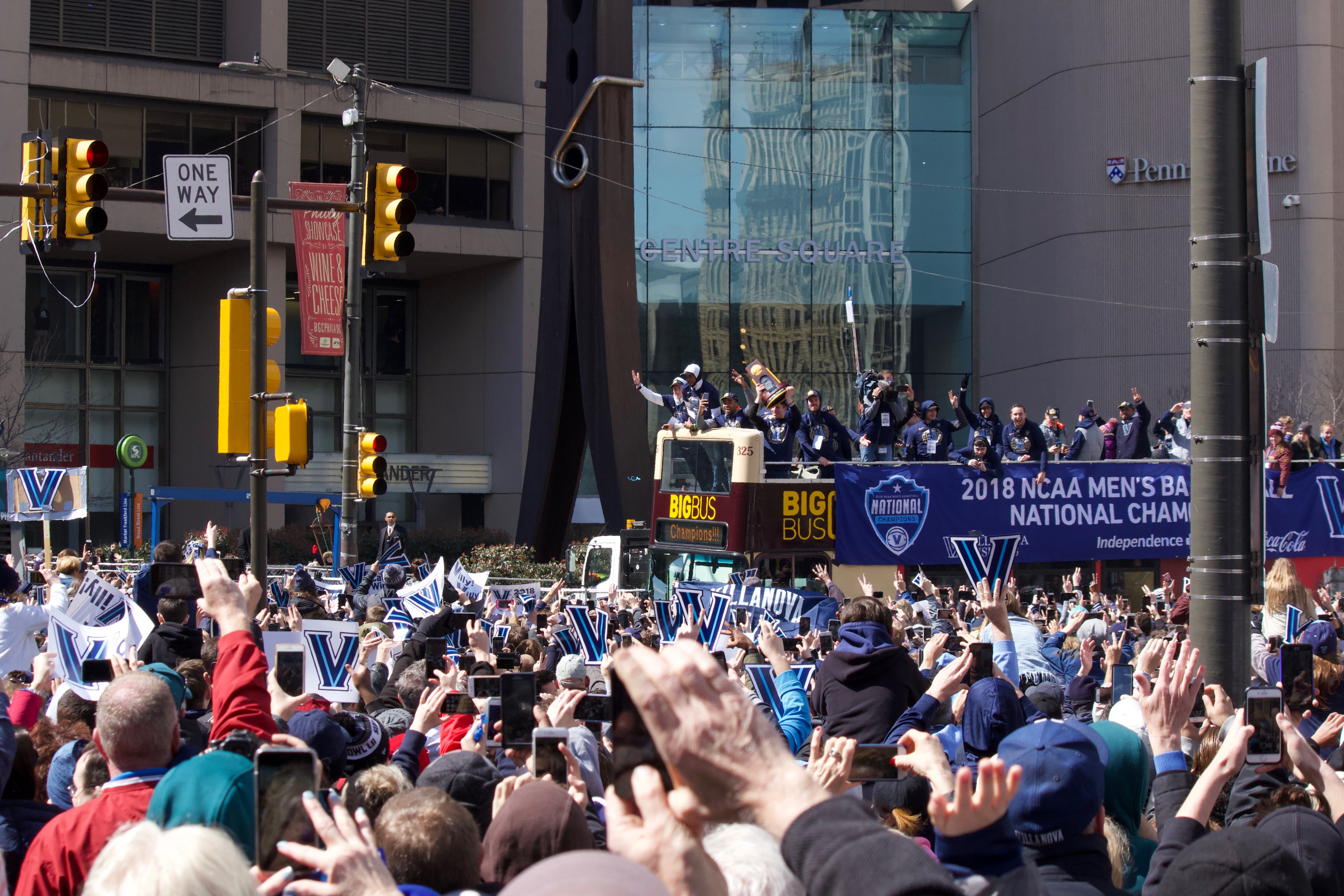
Bus with Championship Trophy

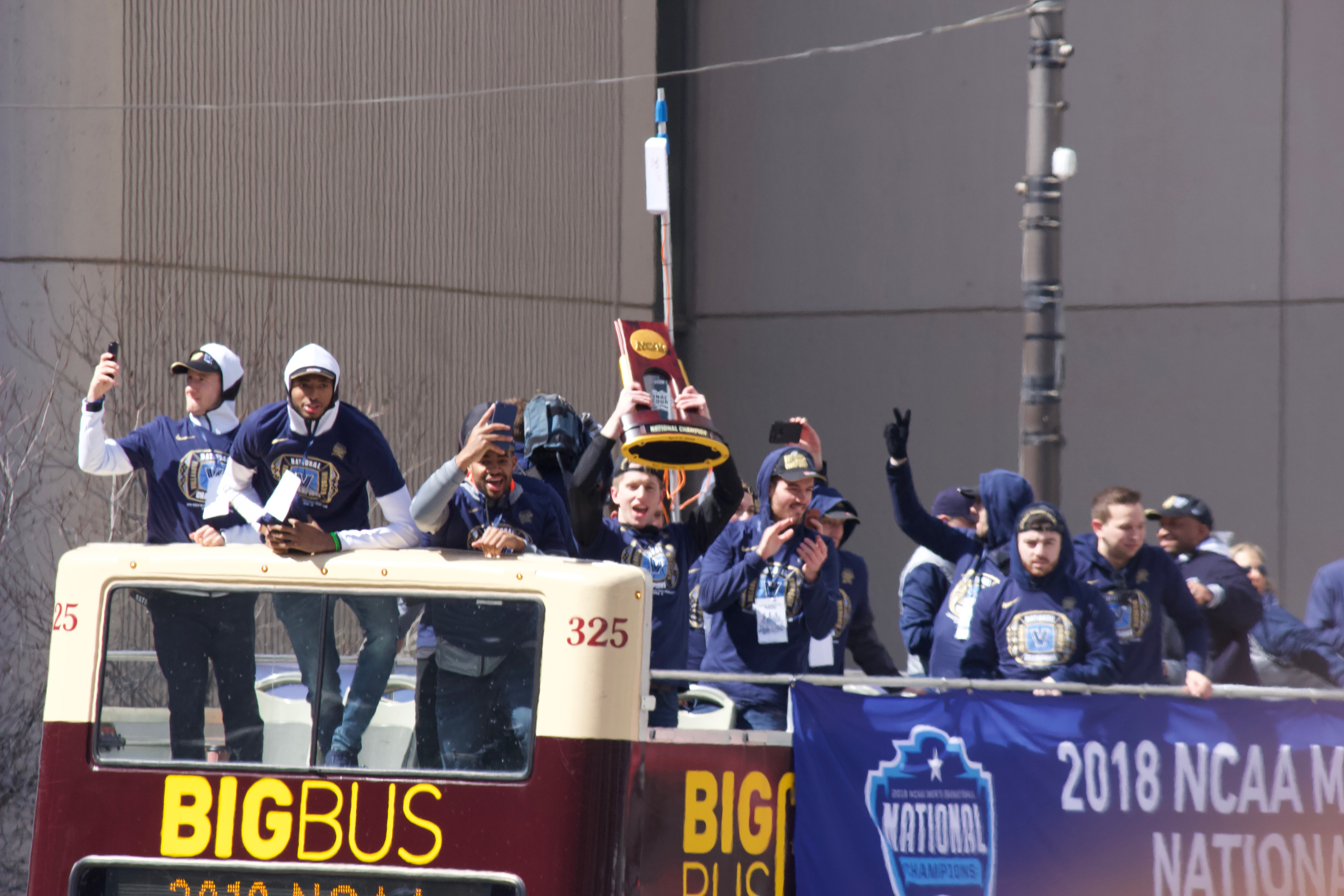
Players with trophy

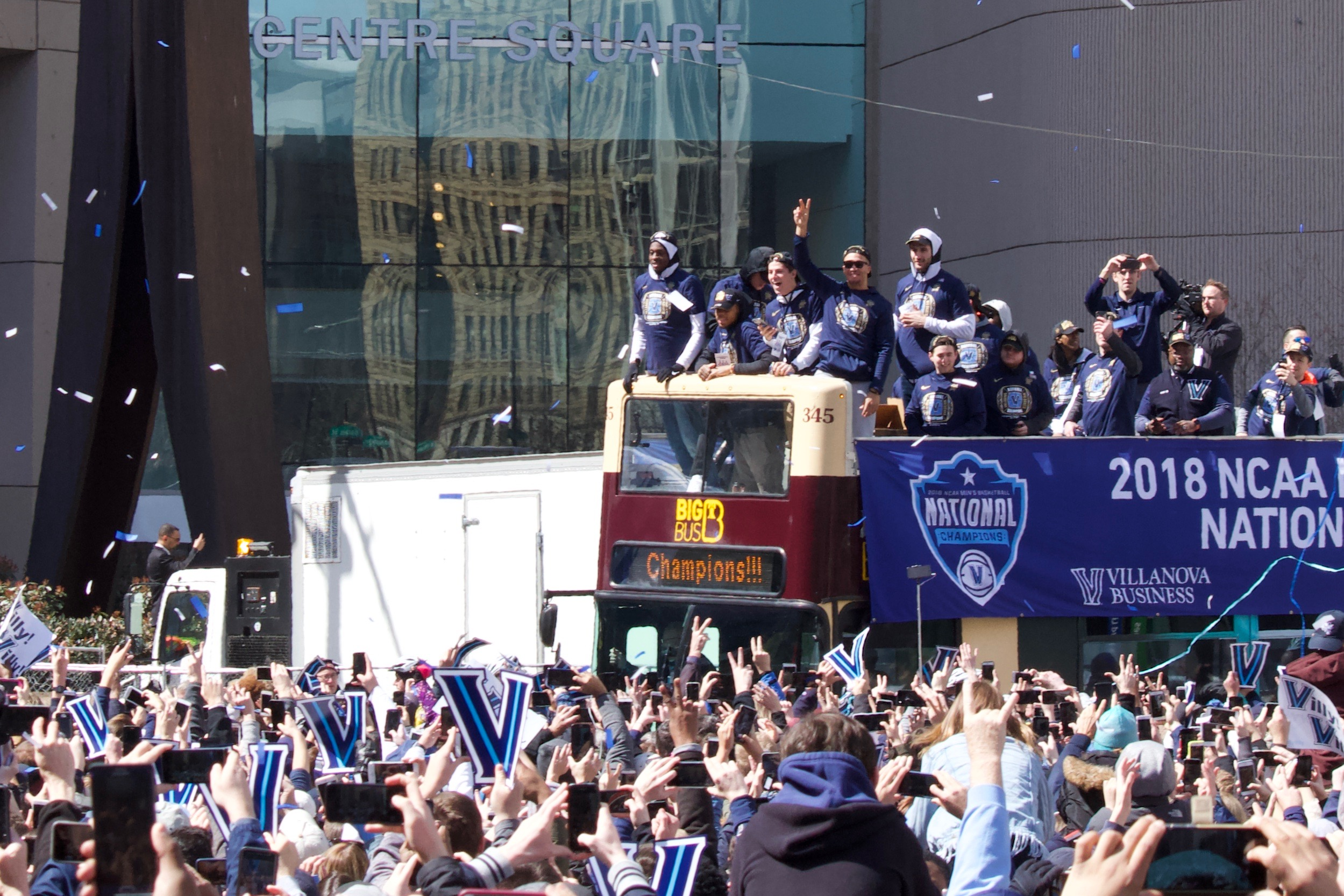
Players on bus

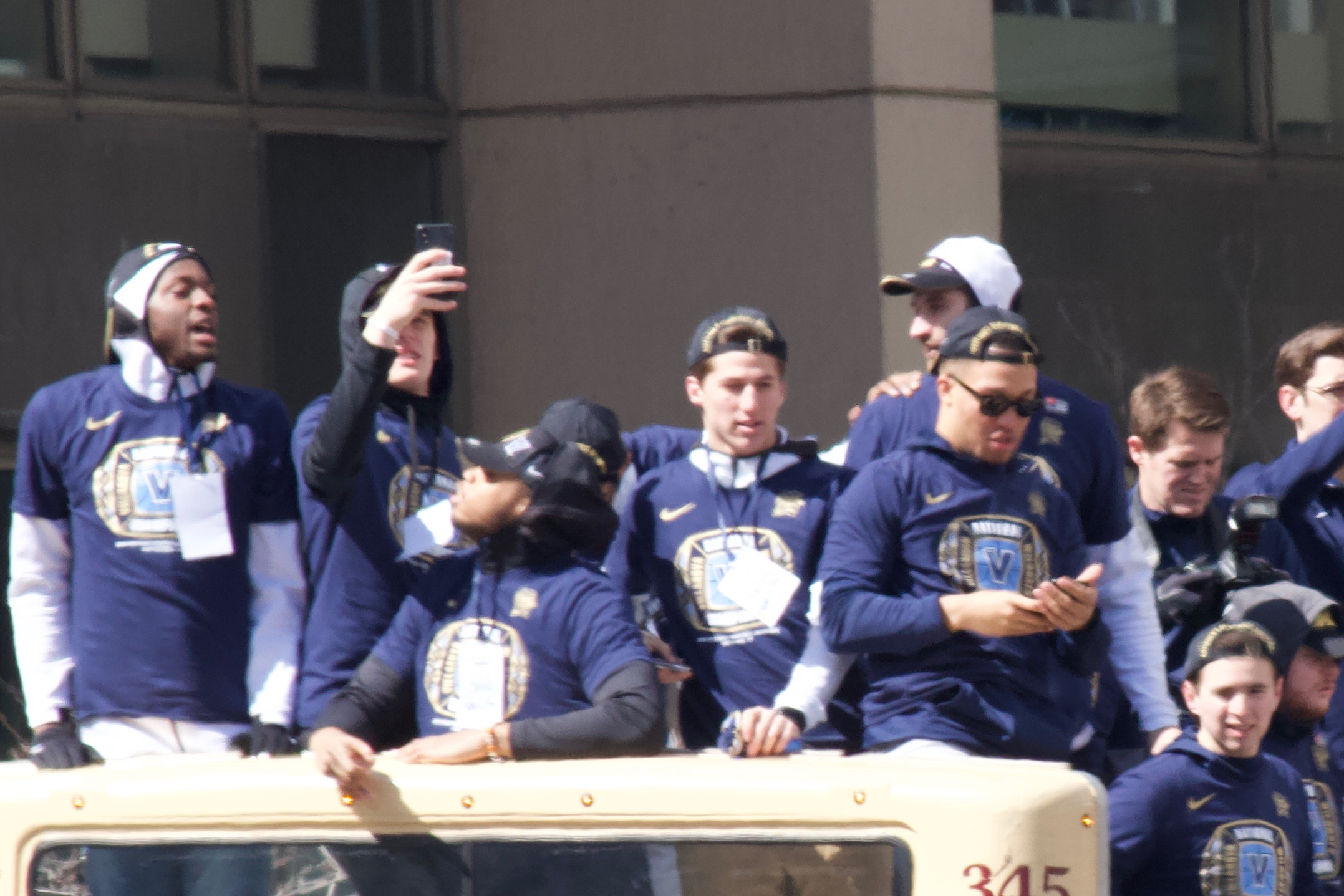
Eric Paschall, Donte DiVincenzo, Omari Spellman, Collin Gillespie, and Jalen Brunson
