= 2017–18 NCAA Division I men's basketball rankings =

- Season: 2017–18
- NCAA Tournament: 2018
- Preseason No. 1: Duke
- NCAA Tournament Champions: Villanova
NCAA Division I men's basketball rankings


Two human polls make up the 2017–18 NCAA Division I men's basketball rankings, the AP Poll and the Coaches Poll, in addition to various publications' preseason polls.

== Legend ==
	Increase in ranking
	Decrease in ranking
	New to rankings from previous week
Italics	Number of first place votes
(#–#)	Win–loss record
т	Tied with team above or below also with this symbol

== AP Poll ==
	Preseason Nov 1	Week 2 Nov 13	Week 3 Nov 20	Week 4 Nov 27	Week 5 Dec 4	Week 6 Dec 11	Week 7 Dec 18	Week 8 Dec 25	Week 9 Jan 1	Week 10 Jan 8	Week 11 Jan 15	Week 12 Jan 22	Week 13 Jan 29	Week 14 Feb 5	Week 15 Feb 12	Week 16 Feb 19	Week 17 Feb 26	Week 18 Mar 5	Week 19 Mar 12	
1.	Duke (33)	Duke (2–0) (34)	Duke (4–0) (54)	Duke (8–0) (65)	Duke (10–0) (65)	Villanova (10–0) (41)	Villanova (11–0) (45)	Villanova (12–0) (43)	Michigan State (14–1) (43)	Villanova (14–1) (52)	Villanova (16–1) (63)	Villanova (18–1) (63)	Villanova (20–1) (47)	Villanova (22–1) (48)	Virginia (23–2) (30)	Virginia (24–2) (42)	Virginia (26–2) (48)	Virginia (28–2) (65)	Virginia (31–2) (65)	1.
2.	Michigan State (13)	Michigan State (1–0) (13)	Arizona (3–0) (11)	Kansas (5–0)	Kansas (7–0)	Michigan State (9–1) (19)	Michigan State (10–1) (15)	Michigan State (12–1) (16)	Duke (13–1) (21)	West Virginia (14–1) (12)	Virginia (16–1) (1)	Virginia (18–1) (1)	Virginia (20–1) (17)	Virginia (22–1) (16)	Michigan State (24–3) (21)	Michigan State (26–3) (19)	Michigan State (28–3) (17)	Villanova (27–4)	Villanova (30–4)	2.
3.	Arizona (18)	Arizona (2–0) (16)	Kansas (3–0)	Michigan State (5–1)	Michigan State (7–1)	Wichita State (8–1)	Arizona State (10–0) (5)	Arizona State (12–0) (6)	Villanova (13–1) (1)	Virginia (14–1) (1)	Purdue (17–2) (1)	Purdue (19–2) (1)	Purdue (21–2) (1)	Purdue (23–2) (1)	Villanova (23–2) (9)	Villanova (24–3) (4)	Xavier (25–4)	Xavier (27–4)	Xavier (28–5)	3.
4.	Kansas (1)	Kansas (1–0) (2)	Michigan State (2–1)	Villanova (6–0)	Villanova (9–0)	Duke (11–1)	Duke (11–1)	Duke (12–1)	Arizona State (12–1)	Michigan State (15–2)	Oklahoma (14–2)	Duke (17–2)	Duke (18–3)	Michigan State (22–3)	Xavier (23–3) (5)	Xavier (24–4)	Villanova (25–4)	Michigan State (29–4)	Kansas (27–7)	4.
5.	Kentucky	Villanova (1–0)	Villanova (3–0)	Notre Dame (6–0)	Florida (5–1)	Arizona State (9–0) (5)	North Carolina (10–1)	Texas A&M (11–1)	Xavier (14–1)	Wichita State (13–2)т	Duke (15–2)	Kansas (16–3)	Michigan State (20–3)	Xavier (21–3)	Cincinnati (23–2)	Duke (22–5)	Duke (24–5)	Duke (25–6)	Michigan State (29–4)	5.
6.	Villanova	Wichita State (1–0)	Wichita State (2–0)	Florida (5–1)	Wichita State (6–1)	Miami (8–0)	Miami (9–0)	Xavier (12–1)	West Virginia (12–1)	Purdue (15–2)т	West Virginia (15–2)	Michigan State (17–3)	Xavier (19–3)	Cincinnati (21–2)	Purdue (23–4)	Texas Tech (22–5) т	Kansas (23–6)	Gonzaga (28–4)	Cincinnati (30–4)	6.
7.	Wichita State	Kentucky (2–0)	Florida (3–0)	Kentucky (6–1)	Texas A&M (7–0)	North Carolina (9–1)	Kentucky (9–1)	West Virginia (11–1)	Oklahoma (11–1)	Duke (13–2)	Wichita State (15–2)	West Virginia (16–3)	Kansas (17–4)	Texas Tech (19–4)	Texas Tech (21–4)	Gonzaga (25–4) т	Gonzaga (27–4)	Michigan (28–7)	Michigan (28–7)	7.
8.	Florida	Florida (0–0)	Kentucky (3–1)	Wichita State (4–1)	Kentucky (7–1)	Kentucky (8–1)	Texas A&M (9–1)	Wichita State (10–2)	Virginia (12–1)	Texas Tech (14–1)	Texas Tech (15–2)	Xavier (18–3)	Cincinnati (19–2)	Auburn (21–2)	Ohio State (22–5)	Kansas (21–6)	Purdue (26–5)	Cincinnati (27–4)	Gonzaga (30–4)	8.
9.	North Carolina	North Carolina (1–0)	North Carolina (2–0)	Texas A&M (6–0)	Notre Dame (7–1)	Texas A&M (8–1)	Xavier (10–1)	Virginia (11–1)	Wichita State (11–2)	Oklahoma (12–2)	Michigan State (16–3)	Cincinnati (17–2)	Arizona (18–4)	Duke (19–4)	Gonzaga (23–4)	Purdue (24–5)	North Carolina (22–7)	Kansas (24–7)	Duke (26–7)	9.
10.	USC	USC (1–0)	USC (3–0)	Miami (5–0)	Miami (7–0)	Xavier (9–1)	West Virginia (9–1)	TCU (12–0)	Kansas (11–2)	Xavier (15–2)	Kansas (14–3)	North Carolina (16–4)	Texas Tech (17–4)	Kansas (18–5)	Auburn (22–3)	North Carolina (21–7)	Cincinnati (25–4)	Purdue (28–6)	North Carolina (25–10)	10.
11.	West Virginia	Miami (2–0)	Miami (3–0)	Cincinnati (6–0)	North Carolina (8–1)	West Virginia (9–1)	Wichita State (8–2)	Kansas (10–2)	Texas A&M (11–2)	Arizona State (13–2)	Xavier (16–3)	Arizona (16–4)	Auburn (19–2)	Saint Mary's (23–2)	Clemson (20–4)	Cincinnati (23–4)	Wichita State (23–5)	Wichita State (24–6)	Purdue (28–6)	11.
12.	Cincinnati	Cincinnati (1–0)	Cincinnati (3–0)	Minnesota (7–0)	Gonzaga (7–1)	Gonzaga (8–2)	Gonzaga (9–2)	Oklahoma (10–1)	North Carolina (12–2)	Kansas (12–3)	Cincinnati (15–2)	Oklahoma (14–4)	Oklahoma (15–5)	Gonzaga (21–4)	Duke (20–5)	Auburn (23–4)	Texas Tech (22–7)	North Carolina (22–9)	Arizona (27–7)	12.
13.	Miami	Notre Dame (1–0)	Notre Dame (3–0)	North Carolina (5–1)	Xavier (7–1)	Kansas (7–2)	Virginia (9–1)	North Carolina (11–2)	Purdue (13–2)	Seton Hall (14–2)	Gonzaga (16–3)	Ohio State (17–4)	Saint Mary's (21–2)	Arizona (19–5)	Kansas (19–6)	Wichita State (21–5)	Ohio State (24–7)	Tennessee (23–7)	Tennessee (25–8)	13.
14.	Notre Dame	Minnesota (1–0)	Minnesota (4–0)	USC (4–1)	Minnesota (8–1)	TCU (10–0)	Kansas (8–2)	Purdue (12–2)	Arizona (11–3)	Cincinnati (14–2)	Arizona (14–4)	Texas Tech (15–4)	Gonzaga (19–4)	Ohio State (20–5)	North Carolina (19–7)	Arizona (21–6)	Auburn (24–5)	Texas Tech (23–8)	Texas Tech (24–9)	14.
15.	Minnesota	Xavier (1–0)	Xavier (3–0)	Gonzaga (5–1)	Virginia (8–0)	Seton Hall (8–1)	TCU (10–0)	Miami (10–1)	Miami (12–1)	Gonzaga (14–3)	North Carolina (14–4)	Gonzaga (17–4)	West Virginia (16–5)	Tennessee (17–5)	Saint Mary's (24–3)	Clemson (20–6)	Michigan (24–7)	Arizona (24–7)	West Virginia (24–10)	15.
16.	Louisville	Texas A&M (1–0)	Texas A&M (2–0)	Baylor (5–0)	Arizona State (7–0)	Virginia (8–1)	Purdue (11–2)	Kentucky (9–2)	TCU (12–1)	TCU (13–2)	Arizona State (14–3)	Saint Mary's (19–2)	Wichita State (17–4)	Clemson (19–4)	Rhode Island (20–3)	Ohio State (22–7)	Tennessee (21–7)	Auburn (25–6)	Wichita State (25–7)	16.
17.	Xavier	Gonzaga (1–0)	Gonzaga (3–0)	Louisville (4–0)	Cincinnati (7–1)	Purdue (10–2)	Oklahoma (8–1)	Arizona (10–3)	Kentucky (11–2)	Arizona (12–4)	Auburn (16–1)	Wichita State (15–4)	Ohio State (18–5)	Oklahoma (16–6)	Arizona (20–6)	Michigan (22–7)	Rhode Island (23–4)	Ohio State (24–8)	Ohio State (24–8)	17.
18.	Gonzaga	Louisville (1–0)	Purdue (4–0)	Virginia (6–0)	West Virginia (7–1)	Notre Dame (8–2)	Arizona (8–3)т	Baylor (10–2)	Texas Tech (12–1)	Miami (13–2)	Kentucky (14–3)	Clemson (16–3)	Tennessee (15–5)	Rhode Island (19–3)	Tennessee (18–6)	Rhode Island (21–4)	Clemson (21–7)	West Virginia (22–9)	Kentucky (24–10)	18.
19.	Northwestern	Purdue (2–0)	Louisville (2–0)	West Virginia (6–1)	Seton Hall (7–1)	Florida State (9–0)	Baylor (9–2)т	Tennessee (9–2)	Gonzaga (12–3)т	Clemson (14–1)	Seton Hall (15–3)	Auburn (17–2)	North Carolina (16–6)	West Virginia (17–6)	Wichita State (19–5)	Tennessee (19–7)	Arizona (22–7)	Clemson (22–8)	Auburn (25–7)	19.
20.	Purdue	Northwestern (1–0)	Seton Hall (4–0)	Arizona State (6–0)	TCU (8–0)	Tennessee (7–1)	Cincinnati (9–2)	Gonzaga (10–3)	Cincinnati (12–2)т	North Carolina (12–4)	Clemson (15–2)	Florida (14–5)	Clemson (17–4)	Michigan (19–6)	West Virginia (18–7)	Nevada (23–5)	West Virginia (21–8)	Saint Mary's (28–4)	Clemson (23–9)	20.
21.	UCLA	Saint Mary's (1–0)	Saint Mary's (4–0)	Xavier (5–1)	Purdue (8–2)	Baylor (7–2)	Tennessee (7–2)т	Cincinnati (10–2)	Seton Hall (13–2)	Kentucky (12–3)	Tennessee (12–4)	Arizona State (15–4)	Kentucky (16–5)	North Carolina (17–7)	Texas A&M (17–8)	West Virginia (19–8)	Nevada (25–5)	Houston (24–6)	Houston (26–7)	21.
22.	Saint Mary's	Seton Hall (2–0)	Baylor (3–0)	Texas Tech (6–0)	Nevada (8–0)	Florida (6–3)	Texas Tech (9–1)т	Texas Tech (11–1)	Arkansas (11–2)	Auburn (14–1)	Ohio State (15–4)	Tennessee (13–5)	Rhode Island (17–3)	Wichita State (17–5)	Michigan (20–7)	Saint Mary's (25–4)	Saint Mary's (27–4)	Nevada (26–6)	Miami (22–9)	22.
23.	Seton Hall	UCLA (1–0)	West Virginia (2–1) т	TCU (6–0)	Baylor (5–2)	Arizona (7–3)	Seton Hall (9–2)	Seton Hall (11–2)	Tennessee (9–3)	Florida State (12–3)	Michigan (15–4)	Nevada (18–3)	Florida (15–6)	Nevada (20–4)	Oklahoma (16–8)	Houston (21–5)	Kentucky (20–9)	Florida (20–11)	Florida (20–12)	23.
24.	Baylor	West Virginia (0–1)	UCLA (3–0) т	Alabama (5–1)	Tennessee (6–1)	Texas Tech (7–1)	Florida State (9–1)	Florida State (11–1)	Florida State (11–2)	Tennessee (10–4)	TCU (13–4)	Rhode Island (15–3)	Michigan (17–6)	Kentucky (17–6)	Nevada (21–5)	Middle Tennessee (22–5)	Middle Tennessee (23–5)	Miami (22–8)	Nevada (27–7)	24.
25.	Texas A&M	Baylor (1–0)	Alabama (3–0)	Creighton (5–1)	USC (4–2)	Cincinnati (7–2)	Creighton (8–2)	Creighton (10–2)	Clemson (12–1)	Creighton (13–3)	Miami (13–3)	Michigan (17–5)	Arizona State (16–5)	Miami (17–5)	Arizona State (19–6)	Florida State (19–8)	Houston (22–6)	Rhode Island (23–6)	Saint Mary's (28–5)	25.
	Preseason Nov 1	Week 2 Nov 13	Week 3 Nov 20	Week 4 Nov 27	Week 5 Dec 4	Week 6 Dec 11	Week 7 Dec 18	Week 8 Dec 25	Week 9 Jan 1	Week 10 Jan 8	Week 11 Jan 15	Week 12 Jan 22	Week 13 Jan 29	Week 14 Feb 5	Week 15 Feb 12	Week 16 Feb 19	Week 17 Feb 26	Week 18 Mar 5	Week 19 Mar 12	
		None	Dropped: Northwestern (3–2)	Dropped: Arizona (3–3); Purdue (5–2); Seton Hall (5–1); Saint Mary's (5–2); UCLA (5–1)	Dropped: Louisville (4–2); Texas Tech (6–1); Alabama (6–2); Creighton (5–2)	Dropped: Minnesota (8–3); Nevada (8–2); USC (4–3)	Dropped: Notre Dame (8–3); Florida (6–4)	None	Dropped: Baylor (10–3); Creighton (11–3)	Dropped: Texas A&M (11–4); Arkansas (11–4)	Dropped: Creighton (14–4); Florida State (13–4)	Dropped: Kentucky (14–5); Seton Hall (15–5); TCU (14–5); Miami (14–4)	Dropped: Nevada (18–4)	Dropped: Florida (15–8); Arizona State (17–6)	Dropped: Kentucky (17–8); Miami (18–6)	Dropped: Arizona State (19–7); Oklahoma (16–10); Texas A&M (17–10)	Dropped: Florida State (19–9)	Dropped: Kentucky (21–10); Middle Tennessee (24–6)	Dropped: Rhode Island (25–7)	

== USA Today Coaches Poll ==
The Coaches Poll is the second oldest poll still in use after the AP Poll. It is compiled by a rotating group of 31 college Division I head coaches. The Poll operates by Borda count. Each voting member ranks teams from 1 to 25. Each team then receives points for their ranking in reverse order: Number 1 earns 25 points, number 2 earns 24 points, and so forth. The points are then combined and the team with the highest points is then ranked No. 1; second highest is ranked No. 2 and so forth. Only the top 25 teams with points are ranked, with teams receiving first place votes noted the quantity next to their name. The maximum points a single team can earn is 775.

	Preseason Oct 19	Week 2 Nov 20	Week 3 Nov 27	Week 4 Dec 3	Week 5 Dec 11	Week 6 Dec 18	Week 7 Dec 26	Week 8 Jan 2	Week 9 Jan 8	Week 10 Jan 17	Week 11 Jan 22	Week 12 Jan 29	Week 13 Feb 5	Week 14 Feb 12	Week 15 Feb 19	Week 16 Feb 26	Week 17 Mar 5	Week 18 Mar 12	Week 19 Apr 3	
1.	Duke (20)	Duke (4–0) (29)	Duke (8–0) (30)	Duke (10–0) (30)	Villanova (10–0) (22)	Villanova (11–0) (26)	Villanova (12–0) (27)	Michigan State (14–1) (25)	Villanova (14–1) (27)	Villanova (16–1) (31)	Villanova (18–1) (30)	Villanova (20–1) (22)	Villanova (22–1) (22)	Michigan State (24–3) (17)	Michigan State (26–3) (20)	Virginia (26–2) (17)	Virginia (28–2) (32)	Virginia (31–2)	Villanova (36–4) (32)	1.
2.	Michigan State (9)	Kansas (3–0) (2)	Kansas (5–0) (1)	Kansas (7–0) (1)	Michigan State (9–1) (10)	Michigan State (10–1) (6)	Michigan State (12–1) (5)	Duke (13–1) (4)	West Virginia (14–1) (4)	Virginia (16–1)	Virginia (18–1)	Virginia (20–1) (8)	Virginia (22–1) (8)	Villanova (23–2) (8)	Virginia (24–2) (3)	Michigan State (28–3) (15)	Xavier (27–4)	Villanova (30–4)	Michigan (33–8)	2.
3.	Kansas	Villanova (3–0) (1)	Michigan State (5–1)	Michigan State (7–1)	Wichita State (8–1)	Duke (11–1)	Duke (12–1)	Villanova (13–1) (1)	Virginia (14–1)	Purdue (17–2) (1)	Purdue (19–2) (1)	Purdue (21–2) (1)	Purdue (23–2) (1)	Virginia (23–2) (5)	Villanova (24–3) (4)	Duke (24–5)	Villanova (27–4)	Kansas (27–7)	Kansas (31–8)	3.
4.	Kentucky	Arizona (3–0)	Villanova (6–0)	Villanova (8–0)	Duke (11–1)	Arizona State (10–0)т	Arizona State (12–0)	Xavier (14–1)	Michigan State (15–2)	Wichita State (15–2)	Duke (17–2)	Michigan State (18–3)	Michigan State (22–3)	Xavier (23–3) (1)	Xavier (24–4)	Xavier (25–4)	Duke (25–6)	Xavier (28–5)	Duke (29–8)	4.
5.	Arizona (2)	Michigan State (2–1)	Notre Dame (6–0)	Florida (5–1)	Kentucky (8–1)	North Carolina (10–1)т	Xavier (12–1)	West Virginia (13–1)	Wichita State (13–2)	Duke (15–2)	Kansas (16–3)	Duke (19–3)	Xavier (21–3)	Cincinnati (23–2) (1)	Duke (22–5)	Villanova (25–4)	Michigan State (29–4)	Michigan State (29–4)	Virginia (31–3)	5.
6.	Villanova	Wichita State (2–0)	Florida (5–1)	Wichita State (6–1)	Arizona State (9–0)	Kentucky (9–1)	Texas A&M (11–1)	Arizona State (12–1)	Duke (13–2)	Oklahoma (14–2)	Michigan State (17–3)	Xavier (19–3)	Cincinnati (21–2)	Texas Tech (21–4)	Gonzaga (25–4)	Kansas (23–6)	Gonzaga (28–4)	Duke (26–7)	Texas Tech (27–10)	6.
7.	Florida (1)	Florida (3–0)	Kentucky (6–1)	Kentucky (7–1)	North Carolina (9–1)	Miami (9–0)	West Virginia(11–1)	Oklahoma (11–1)	Purdue (15–2)	West Virginia (15–2)	West Virginia (16–3)	Kansas (17–4)	Texas Tech (19–4)	Purdue (23–4)	Texas Tech (22–5)	Gonzaga (27–4)	Michigan (28–7)	Michigan (28–7)	Loyola–Chicago (32–6)	7.
8.	Wichita State	Kentucky (3–1)	Wichita State (4–1)	Notre Dame (7–1)	Miami (8–0	Xavier (10–1)	TCU(12–0)	Virginia (12–1)	Texas Tech (14–1)	Texas Tech (15–2)	Cincinnati (17–2)т	Cincinnati (19–2)	Duke (19–4)	Gonzaga (23–4)	Kansas (21–6)	Purdue (26–5)	Cincinnati (27–4)	Gonzaga (30–4)	Xavier (29–6)	8.
9.	North Carolina	North Carolina (2–0)	Cincinnati (6–0)	Texas A&M (7–0)	Xavier (9–1)	Texas A&M (9–1)	Virginia (11–1)	Wichita State (11–2)	Oklahoma (12–2)	Michigan State (16–3)	Xavier (18–3)т	Arizona (18–4)	Auburn (21–2)	Ohio State (22–5)	Purdue (24–5)	North Carolina (22–7)	Kansas (24–7)	North Carolina (25–10)	Purdue (30–7)	9.
10.	West Virginia	USC (3–0)	Texas A&M (6–0)	North Carolina (8–1)	Texas A&M (8–1)	West Virginia (9–1)	Wichita State (10–2)	Kansas (11–2)	Xavier (15–2)	Kansas (14–3)	North Carolina (16–4)	Texas Tech (17–4)	Kansas (18–5)	Duke (20–5)	North Carolina (21–7)	Cincinnati (25–4)	Purdue (28–6)	Cincinnati (30–4)	Gonzaga (32–5)	10.
11.	USC	Miami (3–0)	North Carolina (5–1)	Miami (7–0)	West Virginia (9–1)	Wichita State (8–2)	Kansas (10–2)	North Carolina (12–2)	Arizona State (13–2)	Cincinnati (15–2)	Oklahoma (14–4)	West Virginia (16–5)	Gonzaga (21–4)	Auburn (22–3)	Cincinnati (23–4)	Wichita State (23–5)	North Carolina (22–9)	Purdue (28–6)	Michigan State (30–5)	11.
12.	Miami	Notre Dame (3–0)	Minnesota (7–0)	Virginia (8–0)	Kansas (7–2)	TCU (10–0)	Oklahoma (10–1)	Purdue (13–2)	Kansas (12–3)	Xavier (16–3)	Arizona (16–4)	Gonzaga (19–4)	Saint Mary's (23–2)	Clemson (20–4)	Wichita State (21–5)	Texas Tech (22–7)	Tennessee (23–7)	Tennessee (25–8)	Cincinnati (31–5)	12.
13.	Cincinnati	Cincinnati (3–0)	Miami (5–0)	Gonzaga (7–1)	Gonzaga (8–2)	Kansas (8–2)	Purdue (12–2)	Texas A&M (11–2)	Cincinnati (14–2)	Gonzaga (16–3)	Ohio State (17–4)	Auburn (19–2)	Arizona (19–5)	Kansas (19–6)	Auburn 23–4)	Michigan (24–7)	Texas Tech (23–8)	Texas Tech (24–9)	West Virginia (26–11)	13.
14.	Notre Dame	Xavier (3–0)	Gonzaga (5–1)	Xavier (7–1)	TCU (10–0)	Virginia (9–1)	North Carolina (11–2)	Kentucky (11–2)	Gonzaga (14–3)	North Carolina (14–4)т	Texas Tech (15–4)	Saint Mary's (21–2)	Tennessee (17–5)	Rhode Island (20–3)	Arizona (21–6)	Ohio State (24–7)	Wichita State (24–6)	West Virginia (24–10)	North Carolina (26–11)	14.
15.	Minnesota	Minnesota (4–0)	Virginia (6–0)	Minnesota (8–1)	Seton Hall (8–1)	Gonzaga (9–2)	Kentucky (9–2)	TCU (12–1)	Seton Hall (14–2)	Arizona State (14–3)т	Gonzaga (17–4)	Oklahoma (15–5)	Clemson (19–4)	Saint Mary's (24–3)	Ohio State (22–7)	Auburn (24–5)	Auburn (25–6)	Arizona (27–7)	Clemson (25–10)	15.
16.	Louisville	Purdue (4–0)	Baylor (5–0)	West Virginia (7–1)	Virginia (8–1)	Purdue (11–2)	Miami (11–1)	Arizona (11–3)	TCU (13–2)	Kentucky (14–3)	Wichita State (15–4)	Wichita State (17–4)	Ohio State (20–5)	North Carolina (19–7)	Michigan (22–7)	Rhode Island (23–4)	Ohio State (24–8)	Wichita State (25–7)	Tennessee (26–9)	16.
17.	Xavier	Gonzaga (3–0)	Louisville (4–0)	Arizona State (7–0)т	Purdue (10–2)	Oklahoma (8–1)	Baylor (10–2)	Miami (12–1)	Clemson (14–1)	Arizona (14–4)	Clemson (16–3)	North Carolina (16–6)	West Virginia (17–6)	Tennessee (18–6)	Clemson (20–6)	Tennessee (21–7)	Arizona (24–7)	Ohio State (24–8)	Kentucky (26–11)	17.
18.	UCLA	Louisville (2–0)	USC (4–1)	Cincinnati (7–1)т	Notre Dame (8–2)	Baylor (9–2)	Arizona (10–3)	Texas Tech (12–1)	North Carolina (12–4)	Clemson (15–2)	Saint Mary's (19–2)	Ohio State (18–5)	Oklahoma (16–6)	Wichita State (19–5)	Rhode Island (21–4)	Clemson (21–7)	West Virginia (22–9)	Clemson (23–9)	Florida State (23–12)	18.
19.	Gonzaga	Texas A&M (2–0)	West Virginia (6–1)	Seton Hall (7–1)	Florida State (9–0)	Arizona (8–3)	Gonzaga (10–3)	Gonzaga (12–3)	Miami (13–2)	Seton Hall (15–3)	Arizona State (15–4)	Tennessee (15–5)	Rhode Island (19–3)	Arizona (20–6)	Tennessee (19–7)	West Virginia (21–8)	Saint Mary's (28–4)	Houston (26–7)	Kansas State (25–12)	19.
20.	Northwestern	West Virginia (2–1)	Xavier (5–1)	TCU (8–0)	Tennessee (7–1)	Tennessee (7–2)	Tennessee (9–2)	Cincinnati (12–2)	Kentucky (12–3)	Auburn (16–1)	Auburn (17–2)	Clemson (17–4)	Michigan (19–6)	West Virginia (18–7)	Saint Mary's (25–4)	Saint Mary's (27–4)	Clemson (22–8)	Kentucky (24–10)	Nevada (29–8)	20.
21.	Purdue	Saint Mary's (4–0)	Arizona State (6–0)	Purdue (8–2)	Baylor (7–2)	Texas Tech (9–1)	Texas Tech (11–1)	Seton Hall (13–2)	Arizona (12–4)	Tennessee (12–4)	Tennessee (13–5)	Rhode Island (17–3)	Wichita State (17–5)	Michigan (20–7)	West Virginia (19–8)	Nevada (25–5)	Houston (24–6)	Auburn (25–7)	Ohio State (25–9)	21.
22.	Saint Mary’s	Seton Hall (4–0)	Texas Tech (6–0)	Baylor (5–2)	Florida (6–3)	Seton Hall (9–2)т	Cincinnati (11–2)	Tennessee (9–3)	Creighton (13–3)	Ohio State (15–4)	Florida (14–5)	Kentucky (16–5)	North Carolina (17–7)	Arizona State (19–6)	Nevada (23–5)	Arizona (22–7)	Nevada (26–6)	Rhode Island (25–7)	Houston (27–8)	22.
23.	Seton Hall	UCLA (3–0)	Creighton (5–1)	UCLA (7–1)	Arizona (7–3)	Cincinnati (9–2)т	Creighton (10–2)	Arkansas (11–2)	Tennessee (10–4)	Miami (13–3)	Rhode Island (15–3)	Arizona State (16–5)	Nevada (20–4)	Oklahoma (16–8)	Houston (21–5)	Middle Tennessee (23–5)	Florida (20–11)	Saint Mary's (28–5)	Auburn (26–8)	23.
24.	Baylor	Baylor (3–0)	Seton Hall (5–1)	Nevada (8–0)	Oklahoma (7–1)	Creighton (8–2)	Seton Hall (11–2)	Creighton (11–3)	Auburn (14–1)	Michigan (15–4)	Miami (14–4)	Florida (15–6)	Kentucky (17–6)	Nevada (21–5)	Middle Tennessee (22–5)	Creighton (20–9)	Rhode Island (23–6)	Florida (20–12)	Texas A&M (22–13)	24.
25.	Alabama	Virginia (4–0)	UCLA (5–1)	USC (4–2)	Creighton (7–2)	Florida State (9–1)	Florida State (11–1)	Clemson (12–1)	Notre Dame (13–3)	TCU (13–4)	Michigan (17–5)	Michigan (17–6)	Miami (17–5)	Creighton (18–7)	Arizona State (19–7)	Kentucky (20–9)	Miami (22–8)	Miami (22–9)т Nevada (27–7)т	Wichita State (25–8)	25.
	Preseason Oct 19	Week 2 Nov 20	Week 3 Nov 27	Week 4 Dec 3	Week 5 Dec 11	Week 6 Dec 18	Week 7 Dec 26	Week 8 Jan 2	Week 9 Jan 8	Week 10 Jan 17	Week 11 Jan 22	Week 12 Jan 29	Week 13 Feb 5	Week 14 Feb 12	Week 15 Feb 19	Week 16 Feb 26	Week 17 Mar 5	Week 18 Mar 12	Week 19 Apr 3	
		Dropped: Alabama (3–0); Northwestern(3–2)	Dropped: Arizona (3–3); Purdue (5–2); Saint Mary's (5–2)	Dropped: Louisville (4–2); Texas Tech (6–1); Creighton (5–2)	Dropped: Minnesota (8–3); Cincinnati (7–2); UCLA (7–2); Nevada (8–2); USC (4–3)	Dropped: Notre Dame (8–3); Florida (6–4)	None	Dropped: Baylor (10–3); Florida State (11–2)	Dropped: Texas A&M (11–4); Arkansas (11–4)	Dropped: Creighton (14–4); Notre Dame (13–5)	Dropped: Kentucky (14–5); Seton Hall (15–5); TCU (14–5)	Dropped: Miami (15–5)	Dropped: Arizona State (17–6); Florida (15–8)	Dropped: Kentucky (17–8); Miami (18–6)	Dropped: Creighton (19–8); Oklahoma (16–10)	Dropped: Arizona State (19–9); Houston (22–6)	Dropped: Middle Tennessee (24–6); Creighton (21–10); Kentucky (21–10)	None	Dropped: Arizona (27–8); Rhode Island (26–8); St. Mary’s (30–6); Florida (21–13); Miami (22–10)	

== See also ==
2017–18 NCAA Division I women's basketball rankings
