= 2018–19 Kentucky Wildcats men's basketball team =

2018–19 season of University of Kentucky men's basketball team

2018–19 Kentucky Wildcats men's basketball

NCAA tournament, Elite Eight
- Conference: Southeastern Conference

Ranking
- Coaches: No. 7
- AP: No. 7
- Record: 30–7 (15–3 SEC)
- Head coach: John Calipari (10th season)
- Assistant coaches: Kenny Payne (9th season); Tony Barbee (5th season); Joel Justus (3rd season)
- Home arena: Rupp Arena

2018–19 Southeastern Conference men's basketball standings
	Conf.				Overall
Team	W		L	PCT	W		L	PCT
No. 15 LSU	16	–	2	.889	28	–	7	.800
No. 10 Tennessee	15	–	3	.833	31	–	6	.838
No. 7 Kentucky	15	–	3	.833	30	–	7	.811
No. 5 Auburn†	11	–	7	.611	30	–	10	.750
South Carolina	11	–	7	.611	16	–	16	.500
Mississippi State	10	–	8	.556	23	–	11	.676
Ole Miss	10	–	8	.556	20	–	13	.606
Florida	9	–	9	.500	20	–	16	.556
Alabama	8	–	10	.444	18	–	16	.529
Arkansas	8	–	10	.444	18	–	16	.529
Texas A&M	6	–	12	.333	14	–	18	.438
Missouri	5	–	13	.278	15	–	17	.469
Georgia	2	–	16	.111	11	–	21	.344
Vanderbilt	0	–	18	.000	9	–	23	.281
† 2019 SEC tournament winner Rankings from AP Poll

The 2018–19 Kentucky Wildcats men's basketball team represented the University of Kentucky in the 2018–19 NCAA Division I men's basketball season. The team played its home games in Lexington, Kentucky for the 43rd consecutive season at Rupp Arena, with a capacity of 20,500. The Wildcats, led by John Calipari in his 10th season as head coach, played in the Southeastern Conference.

== Previous season ==
The Wildcats finished the 2017–18 season 26–11, 10–8 in SEC play to finish in a three-way tie for fourth. In the SEC tournament, the Wildcats defeated Georgia, Alabama, and Tennessee to win the tournament championship for the 31st time in school history. As a result, the Wildcats received the conference's automatic bid to the NCAA tournament. As the No. 5 seed in the South region, they defeated No. 12 Davidson and No. 13 Buffalo to advance to the Sweet Sixteen. There, they lost to No. 9-seeded Kansas State.

== Offseason ==
=== Departures ===
On April 2, 2018, Tai Wynyard announced that he would be transferring from Kentucky. On April 6, Kevin Knox II announced that he would declare for the 2018 NBA draft and would hire an agent, forgoing his remaining eligibility. On April 9, Sacha Killeya-Jones announced he would be transferring as well. Also, on April 9, Shai Gilgeous-Alexander announced that he would declare for the draft and would be hiring an agent, forgoing his remaining NCAA eligibility. On April 16, Hamidou Diallo also announced that he would declare for the draft and hire an agent. Three other players announced their entry in the draft, but did not initially hire agents, giving them the option to return to Kentucky. P. J. Washington declared for the draft on April 3, followed by Wenyen Gabriel on April 18 and Jarred Vanderbilt on April 20. On May 30, 2018, the NCAA's final day to announce a return, Washington announced he would return for a sophomore season. Jarred Vanderbilt and Wenyen Gabriel announced on May 30, 2018, that they would remain in the 2018 NBA draft and forgo their remaining college eligibility.

Name	Number	Pos.	Height	Weight	Year	Hometown	Reason left
Tai Wynyard	14	Forward	6'10"	255	Sophomore	Auckland, New Zealand	Transferred to Santa Clara
Shai Gilgeous-Alexander	22	Guard	6'6"	171	Freshman	Hamilton, Ontario	Declared for the 2018 NBA draft
Kevin Knox II	5	Forward	6'9"	215	Freshman	Tampa, Florida	Declared for the 2018 NBA draft
Sacha Killeya-Jones	1	Forward	6'10"	221	Sophomore	Chapel Hill, North Carolina	Transferred to NC State
Dillon Pulliam	30	Guard	6'3"	195	Junior	Cynthiana, Kentucky	Graduated and transferred to Carnegie Mellon
Hamidou Diallo	3	Guard	6'5"	200	Freshman	Queens, New York	Declared for the 2018 NBA draft
Jarred Vanderbilt	2	Forward	6'9"	214	Freshman	Houston, Texas	Declared for the 2018 NBA draft
Wenyen Gabriel	32	Forward	6'9"	205	Sophomore	Manchester, New Hampshire	Declared for the 2018 NBA draft
Quade Green	0	Guard	6'0"	170	Sophomore	Philadelphia, Pennsylvania	Transferred to Washington mid-season

=== 2018 recruiting class ===
Immanuel Quickley, from Havre de Grace, Maryland, was the first commitment to Kentucky's 2018 class. He committed to Kentucky on September 22, over offers from Kansas and Miami. He was a consensus five-star prospect and was ranked the consensus No. 12 overall player by the four main recruiting services. The Wildcats' second 2018 commitment was Keldon Johnson, a small forward from South Hill, Virginia, who committed on November 11. Kentucky beat out Maryland, NC State, and Texas for Johnson's signature. He was also a consensus five-star prospect and was ranked by ESPN as its No. 7 overall prospect. Tyler Herro was the third commitment for Kentucky's 2018 class. Formerly committed to Wisconsin, he committed to Kentucky the week after his official visit. Herro was a consensus four-star prospect and was ranked the No. 4 shooting guard in the 2018 class by ESPN. E.J. Montgomery was the fourth commitment for Kentucky's 2018 class. Formerly committed to Auburn, he re-opened his recruitment after the Auburn staff was implicated in the 2017–18 NCAA Division I men's basketball corruption scandal. Montgomery committed to Kentucky on April 9, 2018. He was a five-star prospect and was ranked No. 12 in the 2018 class. On April 10, 2018, Ashton Hagans committed to the University of Kentucky over offers from Georgia and North Carolina. Hagans was originally the second commitment in the 2019 recruiting class and the No. 1 ranked point guard in the class of 2019 by 247 sports. On June 15, 2018, Hagans announced that he would be reclassifying into the 2018 class and would play for the Cats in the upcoming season, thus making him the fifth recruit in the class of 2018.

College recruiting
Name	Hometown	School	Height	Weight	Commit date
Ashton Hagans; PG	Covington, GA	Newton High School	6 ft 4 in (1.93 m)	185 lb (84 kg)	Apr 10, 2018
Ashton Hagans; PG	Recruit ratings: Scout: Rivals: 247Sports: ESPN: (92)				
Tyler Herro; SG	Milwaukee, WI	Whitnall High School	6 ft 5 in (1.96 m)	195 lb (88 kg)	Nov 14, 2017
Tyler Herro; SG	Recruit ratings: Scout: Rivals: 247Sports: ESPN: (89)				
Keldon Johnson; SF	South Hill, VA	Oak Hill Academy	6 ft 6 in (1.98 m)	210 lb (95 kg)	Nov 11, 2017
Keldon Johnson; SF	Recruit ratings: Scout: Rivals: 247Sports: ESPN: (94)				
E. J. Montgomery; PF	Marietta, GA	Joseph Wheeler High School	6 ft 10 in (2.08 m)	200 lb (91 kg)	Apr 9, 2018
E. J. Montgomery; PF	Recruit ratings: Scout: Rivals: 247Sports: ESPN: (92)				
Immanuel Quickley; PG	Havre de Grace, MD	John Carroll School	6 ft 3 in (1.91 m)	180 lb (82 kg)	Sep 22, 2017
Immanuel Quickley; PG	Recruit ratings: Scout: Rivals: 247Sports: ESPN: (90)				
Overall recruit ranking: Scout: No. 2 Rivals: No. 2 247Sports: No. 2 ESPN: No. 2
Note: In many cases, Scout, Rivals, 247Sports, On3, and ESPN may conflict in their listings of height and weight.; In these cases, the average was taken. ESPN grades are on a 100-point scale.; Sources: "Kentucky 2018 Basketball Commitments". Rivals.; "2018 Kentucky Basketball Commits". Scout.; "2018 Kentucky Basketball Commits". ESPN.; "Scout.com Team Recruiting Rankings". Scout.; "2018 Team Ranking". Rivals.

=== Incoming transfers ===
On June 20, 2018, Reid Travis announced that he would transfer to Kentucky. He was a two-time first team All-Pac-12 for Stanford and averaged 19.5 PPG and 8.7 RPG in his final year with the Cardinal. As a grad transfer, he was eligible to play immediately.

Name	Number	Pos.	Height	Weight	Year	Hometown	Previous school
Reid Travis	22	F	6'8"	245	Graduate student	Minneapolis, MN	Stanford

== Roster ==
2018–19 Kentucky Wildcats men's basketball team
Players
Coaches

Pos.	#	Name	Height	Weight	Year	Previous school	Hometown
G	2	Ashton Hagans	6 ft 4 in (1.93 m)	175 lb (79 kg)	Fr	Newton	Covington, Georgia
F	3	Keldon Johnson	6 ft 6 in (1.98 m)	210 lb (95 kg)	Fr	Oak Hill Academy	South Hill, Virginia
C	4	Nick Richards	6 ft 11 in (2.11 m)	240 lb (109 kg)	So	St. Patrick (NJ)	Kingston, Jamaica
G	5	Immanuel Quickley	6 ft 3 in (1.91 m)	180 lb (82 kg)	Fr	John Carroll	Havre de Grace, Maryland
G	10	Jonny David (W)	6 ft 2 in (1.88 m)	183 lb (83 kg)	Sr	Mt. Lebanon	Pittsburgh, Pennsylvania
G	12	Brad Calipari (W) (redshirt)	6 ft 0 in (1.83 m)	176 lb (80 kg)	Jr	MacDuffie	Franklin Lakes, New Jersey
G	13	Jemarl Baker	6 ft 4 in (1.93 m)	182 lb (83 kg)	RS Fr	Eleanor Roosevelt	Eastvale, California
G	14	Tyler Herro	6 ft 5 in (1.96 m)	195 lb (88 kg)	Fr	Whitnall	Milwaukee, Wisconsin
F	21	Zan Payne (W) (redshirt)	6 ft 4 in (1.93 m)	200 lb (91 kg)	Fr	Lexington Catholic	Lexington, Kentucky
F	22	Reid Travis	6 ft 8 in (2.03 m)	245 lb (111 kg)	GS	Stanford	Minneapolis, Minnesota
F	23	E. J. Montgomery	6 ft 10 in (2.08 m)	215 lb (98 kg)	Fr	Joseph Wheeler	Marietta, Georgia
F	25	P. J. Washington	6 ft 7 in (2.01 m)	236 lb (107 kg)	So	Findlay Prep	Dallas, Texas

Head coach

- John Calipari (Clarion)

Assistant coach(es)

- Kenny Payne (Louisville)
- Tony Barbee (UMass)
- Joel Justus (UNC Wilmington)
- John Robic (Denison)

Legend

- (C) Team captain
- (S) Suspended
- (I) Ineligible
- (W) Walk-on
- Injured
- Current redshirt

Roster

- Roster is subject to change as/if players transfer or leave the program for other reasons.

=== Depth chart ===
Pos.	Starting 5	Bench 1	Bench 2
C	Reid Travis	Nick Richards
PF	P. J. Washington	E. J. Montgomery
SF	Keldon Johnson	Jemarl Baker	Zan Payne
SG	Tyler Herro	Jonny David
PG	Ashton Hagans	Immanuel Quickley	Brad Calipari

== Schedule and results ==
Date time, TV	Rank^{#}	Opponent^{#}	Result	Record	High points	High rebounds	High assists	Site (attendance) city, state
Big Blue Bahamas exhibition trip
August 8, 2018*; 7:00 pm, SECN		vs. Bahamas National Team	W 85–61	–	19 – Richards	14 – Travis	5 – Green	Imperial Arena; Nassau, BAH
August 9, 2018*; 7:00 pm, SECN		vs. San Lorenzo de Almagro	W 91–68	–	22 – Herro	7 – Quickley	5 – Quickley	Imperial Arena; Nassau, BAH
August 11, 2018*; 7:00 pm, SECN		vs. Mega Bemax	W 100–64	–	20 – Washington	12 – Washington	5 – Tied	Imperial Arena; Nassau, BAH
August 12, 2018*; 4:00 pm, SECN		vs. Team Toronto	W 93–60	–	19 – Travis	15 – Travis	4 – Quickley	Imperial Arena; Nassau, BAH
Exhibition
October 26, 2018*; 7:00 pm, SECN	No. 2	Transylvania	W 94–66	–	14 – Montgomery	10 – Travis	4 – Quickley	Rupp Arena (19,927); Lexington, KY
November 2, 2018*; 7:00 pm, SECN	No. 2	IUP	W 86–64	–	22 – Travis	14 – Travis	5 – Johnson	Rupp Arena (20,095); Lexington, KY
Regular season
November 6, 2018*; 9:30 pm, ESPN	No. 2	vs. No. 4 Duke; Champions Classic	L 84–118	0–1	23 – Johnson	9 – Herro	5 – Herro	Bankers Life Fieldhouse (18,907); Indianapolis, IN
November 9, 2018*; 7:00 pm, SECN	No. 2	Southern Illinois	W 71–59	1–1	15 – Tied	19 – Richards	3 – Tied	Rupp Arena (20,277); Lexington, KY
November 14, 2018*; 9:00 pm, SECN	No. 10	North Dakota; Ohio Valley Hardwood Showcase	W 96–58	2–1	25 – Washington	10 – Johnson	5 – Green	Rupp Arena (18,555); Lexington, KY
November 18, 2018*; 6:00 pm, SECN	No. 10	VMI; Ohio Valley Hardwood Showcase	W 92–82	3–1	22 – Travis	18 – Washington	4 – Hagans	Rupp Arena (20,207); Lexington, KY
November 21, 2018*; 1:00 pm, SECN	No. 10	Winthrop; Ohio Valley Hardwood Showcase	W 87–74	4–1	19 – Washington	11 – Washington	7 – Herro	Rupp Arena (20,070); Lexington, KY
November 23, 2018*; 7:00 pm, SECN	No. 10	Tennessee State; Ohio Valley Hardwood Showcase	W 77–62	5–1	27 – Johnson	9 – Travis	4 – Green	Rupp Arena (20,224); Lexington, KY
November 28, 2018*; 8:30 pm, SECN	No. 10	Monmouth	W 90–44	6–1	16 – Herro	8 – Tied	3 – Tied	Rupp Arena (18,680); Lexington, KY
December 1, 2018*; 1:00 pm, ESPN2	No. 10	UNC Greensboro	W 78–61	7–1	22 – Travis	12 – Travis	3 – Hagans	Rupp Arena (21,853); Lexington, KY
December 8, 2018*; 12:00 pm, FOX	No. 9	vs. Seton Hall; Citi Hoops Classic	L 83–84 ^{OT}	7–2	26 – Washington	12 – Washington	4 – Tied	Madison Square Garden (10,244); New York, NY
December 15, 2018*; 5:00 pm, ESPN2	No. 19	Utah	W 88–61	8–2	24 – Johnson	5 – Montgomery	7 – Hagans	Rupp Arena (21,922); Lexington, KY
December 22, 2018*; 5:15 pm, CBS	No. 19	vs. No. 9 North Carolina; CBS Sports Classic/Rivalry	W 80–72	9–2	23 – Johnson	9 – Washington	8 – Washington	United Center; Chicago, IL
December 29, 2018*; 2:00 pm, ESPN2	No. 16	at Louisville; Battle for the Bluegrass	W 71–58	10–2	24 – Herro	8 – Washington	3 – Tied	KFC Yum! Center (20,882); Louisville, KY
January 5, 2019; 1:00 pm, ESPN	No. 13	at Alabama	L 75–77	10–3 (0–1)	15 – Washington	7 – Tied	6 – Hagans	Coleman Coliseum (12,424); Tuscaloosa, AL
January 8, 2019; 7:00 pm, SECN	No. 18	Texas A&M	W 85–74	11–3 (1–1)	21 – Herro	6 – Johnson	4 – Hagans	Rupp Arena (22,048); Lexington, KY
January 12, 2019; 8:30 pm, SECN	No. 18	Vanderbilt	W 56–47	12–3 (2–1)	15 – Tied	12 – Travis	4 – Hagans	Rupp Arena (22,504); Lexington, KY
January 15, 2019; 7:00 pm, ESPN	No. 12	at Georgia	W 69–49	13–3 (3–1)	23 – Hagans	7 – Tied	4 – Tied	Stegeman Coliseum (10,523); Athens, GA
January 19, 2019; 4:00 pm, ESPN	No. 12	at No. 14 Auburn	W 82–80	14–3 (4–1)	20 – Tied	7 – Tied	6 – Hagans	Auburn Arena (9,121); Auburn, AL
January 22, 2019; 7:00 pm, ESPN	No. 8	No. 22 Mississippi State	W 76–55	15–3 (5–1)	21 – Washington	12 – Travis	9 – Hagans	Rupp Arena (21,449); Lexington, KY
January 26, 2019*; 6:00 pm, ESPN	No. 8	No. 9 Kansas; Big 12/SEC Challenge/ESPN College GameDay	W 71–63	16–3	20 – Washington	13 – Washington	7 – Hagans	Rupp Arena (24,387); Lexington, KY
January 29, 2019; 9:00 pm, ESPN	No. 7	at Vanderbilt	W 87–52	17–3 (6–1)	26 – Washington	12 – Washington	8 – Hagans	Memorial Gymnasium (12,298); Nashville, TN
February 2, 2019; 4:00 pm, ESPN	No. 7	at Florida; Rivalry	W 65–54	18–3 (7–1)	19 – Herro	12 – Washington	4 – Hagans	O'Connell Center (10,763); Gainesville, FL
February 5, 2019; 7:00 pm, SECN	No. 5	South Carolina	W 76–48	19–3 (8–1)	20 – Washington	13 – Montgomery	4 – Tied	Rupp Arena (20,496); Lexington, KY
February 9, 2019; 1:00 pm, CBS	No. 5	at Mississippi State	W 71–67	20–3 (9–1)	23 – Washington	8 – Travis	9 – Hagans	Humphrey Coliseum (9,019); Starkville, MS
February 12, 2019; 7:00 pm, ESPN	No. 5	No. 19 LSU	L 71–73	20–4 (9–2)	20 – Washington	9 – Tied	4 – Herro	Rupp Arena (23,490); Lexington, KY
February 16, 2019; 8:00 pm, ESPN	No. 5	No. 1 Tennessee; Rivalry/ESPN College GameDay	W 86–69	21–4 (10–2)	23 – Washington	13 – Herro	7 – Hagans	Rupp Arena (24,467); Lexington, KY
February 19, 2019; 9:00 pm, ESPN	No. 4	at Missouri	W 66–58	22–4 (11–2)	18 – Tied	8 – Washington	3 – Washington	Mizzou Arena (10,703); Columbia, MO
February 23, 2019; 1:30 pm, CBS	No. 4	Auburn	W 80–53	23–4 (12–2)	24 – Washington	17 – Johnson	5 – Tied	Rupp Arena (23,427); Lexington, KY
February 26, 2019; 9:00 pm, SECN	No. 4	Arkansas	W 70–66	24–4 (13–2)	29 – Herro	15 – Richards	6 – Washington	Rupp Arena (21,998); Lexington, KY
March 2, 2019; 2:00 pm, CBS	No. 4	at No. 7 Tennessee; Rivalry	L 52–71	24–5 (13–3)	13 – Washington	7 – Tied	3 – Tied	Thompson–Boling Arena (21,729); Knoxville, TN
March 5, 2019; 9:00 pm, ESPN	No. 6	at Ole Miss	W 80–76	25–5 (14–3)	22 – Johnson	7 – Johnson	4 – Washington	The Pavilion at Ole Miss (9,500); Oxford, MS
March 9, 2019; 2:00 pm, CBS	No. 6	Florida; Rivalry	W 66–57	26–5 (15–3)	16 – Herro	9 – Washington	3 – Johnson	Rupp Arena (24,456); Lexington, KY
SEC Tournament
March 15, 2019; 7:00 pm, SECN	(2) No. 4	vs. (10) Alabama; Quarterfinals	W 73–55	27–5	20 – Herro	12 – Washington	6 – Hagans	Bridgestone Arena (37,250); Nashville, TN
March 16, 2019; 3:30 pm, ESPN	(2) No. 4	vs. (3) No. 8 Tennessee; Semifinals	L 78–82	27–6	16 – Washington	6 – Tied	12 – Hagans	Bridgestone Arena (20,933); Nashville, TN
NCAA tournament
March 21, 2019*; 7:10 pm, CBS	(2 MW) No. 7	vs. (15 MW) Abilene Christian; First Round	W 79–44	28–6	25 – Johnson	11 – Montgomery	4 – Hagans	VyStar Veterans Memorial Arena (13,495); Jacksonville, FL
March 23, 2019*; 2:40 pm, CBS	(2 MW) No. 7	vs. (7 MW) No. 19 Wofford; Second Round	W 62–56	29–6	14 – Travis	11 – Travis	4 – Tied	VyStar Veterans Memorial Arena (14,250); Jacksonville, FL
March 29, 2019*; 9:59 pm, TBS	(2 MW) No. 7	vs. (3 MW) No. 11 Houston; Sweet Sixteen	W 62–58	30–6	19 – Herro	11 – Travis	4 – Johnson	Sprint Center (17,385); Kansas City, MO
March 31, 2019*; 2:20 pm, CBS	(2 MW) No. 7	vs. (5 MW) No. 14 Auburn; Elite Eight	L 71–77 ^{OT}	30–7	28 – Washington	13 – Washington	6 – Herro	Sprint Center (17,174); Kansas City, MO
*Non-conference game. ^{#}Rankings from AP Poll. (#) Tournament seedings in parentheses. All times are in Eastern Time.

== Rankings ==
Ranking movements Legend: ██ Increase in ranking ██ Decrease in ranking ( ) = First-place votes
	Week																				
Poll	Pre	1	2	3	4	5	6	7	8	9	10	11	12	13	14	15	16	17	18	19	Final
AP	2 (19)	10	10	10	9	19	19	16	13	18	12	8	7	5	5	4	4 (3)	6	4	7	Not released
Coaches	2 (12)	2^ (12)	10	9	8	18	18	15	14	18	14	9	6	5	5	4	4 (4)	6	4	7	7

*AP does not release post-NCAA Tournament rankings.
^Coaches did not release a Week 2 poll.
