= 2018–19 Southeastern Conference men's basketball season =

- League: NCAA Division I
- Sport: Basketball
- Teams: 14
- TV partner(s): CBS, ESPN, SEC Network

Regular season
- 2019 SEC Champions: LSU
- Season MVP: Grant Williams, Tennessee

Tournament
- Venue: Bridgestone Arena, Nashville, Tennessee
- Champions: Auburn
- Runners-up: Tennessee
- Finals MVP: Bryce Brown, Auburn

Basketball seasons
- ← 2017–18 2019–20 →

2018–19 Southeastern Conference men's basketball standings
| | Conf. | | | | Overall |
| Team | W | | L | PCT | W | | L | PCT |
|---|---|---|---|---|---|---|---|---|
| No. 15 LSU | 16 | – | 2 | .889 | 28 | – | 7 | .800 |
| No. 10 Tennessee | 15 | – | 3 | .833 | 31 | – | 6 | .838 |
| No. 7 Kentucky | 15 | – | 3 | .833 | 30 | – | 7 | .811 |
| No. 5 Auburn† | 11 | – | 7 | .611 | 30 | – | 10 | .750 |
| South Carolina | 11 | – | 7 | .611 | 16 | – | 16 | .500 |
| Mississippi State | 10 | – | 8 | .556 | 23 | – | 11 | .676 |
| Ole Miss | 10 | – | 8 | .556 | 20 | – | 13 | .606 |
| Florida | 9 | – | 9 | .500 | 20 | – | 16 | .556 |
| Alabama | 8 | – | 10 | .444 | 18 | – | 16 | .529 |
| Arkansas | 8 | – | 10 | .444 | 18 | – | 16 | .529 |
| Texas A&M | 6 | – | 12 | .333 | 14 | – | 18 | .438 |
| Missouri | 5 | – | 13 | .278 | 15 | – | 17 | .469 |
| Georgia | 2 | – | 16 | .111 | 11 | – | 21 | .344 |
| Vanderbilt | 0 | – | 18 | .000 | 9 | – | 23 | .281 |
† 2019 SEC tournament winner Rankings from AP Poll

The 2018–19 Southeastern Conference men's basketball season began with practices in October 2018, followed by the start of the 2018–19 NCAA Division I men's basketball season in November. Conference play started in early January 2019 and will end in March, after which 14 member teams will participate in the 2019 SEC tournament at Bridgestone Arena in Nashville, Tennessee. The tournament champion is guaranteed a selection to the 2019 NCAA tournament.

== Preseason ==
=== Preseason polls ===
| | AP | Athlon; Sports | Bleacher; Report | Blue Ribbon; Yearbook | CBS Sports | Coaches | ESPN | FOX Sports | KenPom | Lindy's; Sports | NBC Sports | SBNation | Sporting; News | Sports; Illustrated | USBWA | Yahoo Sports |
| Alabama | RV | | | | #19 | #25 | #27 | | | | #23 | | | #21 | | |
| Arkansas | | | | | #36 | RV | #65 | | | | | | | #49 | | |
| Auburn | | | | | #66 | | #35 | | | | | | | #33 | | |
| Florida | #8 | | #10 | | #9 | #7 | #15 | | | | #7 | #9 | | #10 | | |
| Georgia | | | | | #53 | RV | #57 | | | | | | | #58 | | |
| Kentucky | #5 | | #6 | | #6 | #4 | #9 | | | | #8 | #6 | | #8 | | |
| LSU | | | | | #147 | | #88 | | | | | | | #91 | | |
| Mississippi State | | | | | #76 | | #69 | | | | | | | #48 | | |
| Missouri | RV | | | | #37 | RV | #71 | | | | | #25 | | #39 | | |
| Ole Miss | | | | | #88 | | #59 | | | | | | | #53 | | |
| South Carolina | RV | | | | #81 | RV | #40 | | | | | | | #61 | | |
| Tennessee | | | | | #118 | | #49 | | | | | | | #76 | | |
| Texas A&M | #25 | | #21 | | #27 | RV | #19 | | | | #19 | | | #29 | | |
| Vanderbilt | | | | | #46 | | #61 | | | | | | | #59 | | |

=== Media Day Selections ===
| | Media |
| 1. | Kentucky |
| 2. | Tennessee |
| 3. | Auburn |
| 4. | Mississippi State |
| 5. | Florida |
| 6. | LSU |
| 7. | Alabama |
| 8. | Vanderbilt |
| 9. | Missouri |
| 10. | Arkansas |
| 11. | South Carolina |
| 12. | Texas A&M |
| 13. | Georgia |
| 14. | Ole Miss |

() first place votes

=== Preseason All-SEC teams ===
| Media | Coaches |
|---|---|
| Daniel Gafford Arkansas | Daniel Gafford Arkansas |
| Chris Silva South Carolina | Admiral Schofield Tennessee |
| Reid Travis Kentucky | Chris Silva South Carolina |
| Tremont Waters LSU | Reid Travis Kentucky |
| **Grant Williams Tennessee** | P. J. Washington Kentucky |
| | Tremont Waters LSU |
| | Quinndary Weatherspoon Mississippi State |
| | Grant Williams Tennessee |

- Media select a five-member first team; coaches select an eight-member first team
- Players in bold are media choices for SEC Player of the Year; coaches do not select a preseason Player of the Year

== Head coaches ==
Note: Stats shown are before the beginning of the season. Overall and SEC records are from time at current school.

| Team | Head coach | Previous job | Season at school | Overall record | SEC record | NCAA Tournaments | NCAA Final Fours | NCAA Championships |
|---|---|---|---|---|---|---|---|---|
| Alabama | Avery Johnson | Brooklyn Nets | 4 | 57–46 (.553) | 26–28 (.481) | 1 | 0 | 0 |
| Arkansas | Mike Anderson | Missouri | 8 | 151–73 (.674) | 70–54 (.565) | 3 | 0 | 0 |
| Auburn | Bruce Pearl | Tennessee | 5 | 70–62 (.530) | 29–43 (.403) | 1 | 0 | 0 |
| Florida | Mike White | Louisiana Tech | 4 | 69–37 (.651) | 34–20 (.630) | 2 | 0 | 0 |
| Georgia | Tom Crean | Indiana | 1 | 0–0 (–) | 0–0 (–) | 0 | 0 | 0 |
| Kentucky | John Calipari | Memphis | 10 | 273–64 (.810) | 121–35 (.776) | 8 | 4 | 1 |
| LSU | Will Wade | VCU | 2 | 18–15 (.545) | 8–10 (.444) | 0 | 0 | 0 |
| Mississippi State | Ben Howland | UCLA | 4 | 56–45 (.554) | 22–32 (.407) | 0 | 0 | 0 |
| Missouri | Cuonzo Martin | California | 2 | 20–13 (.606) | 10–8 (.556) | 1 | 0 | 0 |
| Ole Miss | Kermit Davis | Middle Tennessee | 1 | 0–0 (–) | 0–0 (–) | 0 | 0 | 0 |
| South Carolina | Frank Martin | Kansas State | 7 | 113–90 (.557) | 45–63 (.417) | 1 | 1 | 0 |
| Tennessee | Rick Barnes | Texas | 4 | 57–44 (.564) | 27–27 (.500) | 1 | 0 | 0 |
| Texas A&M | Billy Kennedy | Murray State | 7 | 136–98 (.581) | 60–66 (.476) | 1 | 0 | 0 |
| Vanderbilt | Bryce Drew | Valparaiso | 2 | 31–36 (.463) | 16–20 (.444) | 1 | 0 | 0 |

== Rankings ==
Legend
| Increase in ranking |
| Decrease in ranking |
| Not ranked previous week |

| | | Pre | Wk 2 | Wk 3 | Wk 4 | Wk 5 | Wk 6 | Wk 7 | Wk 8 | Wk 9 | Wk 10 | Wk 11 | Wk 12 | Wk 13 | Wk 14 | Wk 15 | Wk 16 | Wk 17 | Wk 18 | Wk 19 | Final |
|---|---|---|---|---|---|---|---|---|---|---|---|---|---|---|---|---|---|---|---|---|---|
| Alabama | AP | RV | RV | | | | | | | | | | | | | | | | | | |
| Alabama | C | RV | | | | | | | | | | | | | | | | | | | |
| Arkansas | AP | | | | | | | | | | | | | | | | | | | | |
| Arkansas | C | | | | | | | | | | | | | | | | | | | | |
| Auburn | AP | 11 | 9 | | | | | | | | | | | | | | | | | | |
| Auburn | C | 12 | 12 | | | | | | | | | | | | | | | | | | |
| Florida | AP | RV | RV | | | | | | | | | | | | | | | | | | |
| Florida | C | RV | RV | | | | | | | | | | | | | | | | | | |
| Georgia | AP | | | | | | | | | | | | | | | | | | | | |
| Georgia | C | | | | | | | | | | | | | | | | | | | | |
| Kentucky | AP | 2 | 10 | | | | | | | | | | | | | | | | | | |
| Kentucky | C | 2 | 10 | | | | | | | | | | | | | | | | | | |
| LSU | AP | 23 | 22 | | | | | | | | | | | | | | | | | | |
| LSU | C | RV | RV | | | | | | | | | | | | | | | | | | |
| Mississippi State | AP | 18 | 17 | | | | | | | | | | | | | | | | | | |
| Mississippi State | C | 19 | 19 | | | | | | | | | | | | | | | | | | |
| Missouri | AP | RV | | | | | | | | | | | | | | | | | | | |
| Missouri | C | RV | | | | | | | | | | | | | | | | | | | |
| Ole Miss | AP | | | | | | | | | | | | | | | | | | | | |
| Ole Miss | C | | | | | | | | | | | | | | | | | | | | |
| South Carolina | AP | | | | | | | | | | | | | | | | | | | | |
| South Carolina | C | | | | | | | | | | | | | | | | | | | | |
| Tennessee | AP | 6 | 5 | | | | | | | | | | | | | | | | | | |
| Tennessee | C | 6 | 6 | | | | | | | | | | | | | | | | | | |
| Texas A&M | AP | | | | | | | | | | | | | | | | | | | | |
| Texas A&M | C | | | | | | | | | | | | | | | | | | | | |
| Vanderbilt | AP | | RV | | | | | | | | | | | | | | | | | | |
| Vanderbilt | C | | RV | | | | | | | | | | | | | | | | | | |

== Regular season ==
=== Big 12/SEC Challenge ===
| Date | Time | Big 12 team | SEC team | Location | TV | Attendance | Winner | Leader |
|---|---|---|---|---|---|---|---|---|
| Sat., Jan. 26 | 12:00 PM | Baylor | Alabama | Ferrell Center • Waco, TX | ESPNU | 7,094 | Baylor (73-68) | Big 12 (1–0) |
| Sat., Jan. 26 | 12:00 PM | No. 24 Iowa State | No. 20 Ole Miss | The Pavilion at Ole Miss • Oxford, MS | ESPN | 8,839 | Iowa State (87–73) | Big 12 (2–0) |
| Sat., Jan. 26 | 12:00 PM | TCU | Florida | Schollmaier Arena • Fort Worth, TX | ESPN2 | 6,682 | TCU (55-50) | Big 12 (3–0) |
| Sat., Jan. 26 | 2:00 PM | Kansas State | Texas A&M | Reed Arena • College Station, TX | ESPN | 7,100 | Texas A&M (65-53) | Big 12 (3-1) |
| Sat., Jan. 26 | 2:00 PM | Oklahoma State | South Carolina | Gallagher-Iba Arena • Stillwater, OK | ESPNU | 7,658 | Oklahoma State (74-70) | Big 12 (4-1) |
| Sat., Jan. 26 | 2:00 PM | Texas | Georgia | Stegeman Coliseum • Athens, GA | ESPN2 | 10,374 | Georgia (98-88) | Big 12 (4-2) |
| Sat., Jan. 26 | 4:00 PM | Oklahoma | Vanderbilt | Lloyd Noble Center • Norman, OK | ESPN2 | 8,848 | Oklahoma (86-55) | Big 12 (5-2) |
| Sat., Jan. 26 | 4:00 PM | West Virginia | No. 1 Tennessee | Thompson–Boling Arena • Knoxville, TN | ESPN | 22,149 | Tennessee (83-66) | Big 12 (5-3) |
| Sat., Jan. 26 | 6:00 PM | No. 9 Kansas | No. 8 Kentucky | Rupp Arena • Lexington, KY | ESPN | 24,387 | Kentucky (71-63) | Big 12 (5-4) |
| Sat., Jan. 26 | 6:00 PM | No. 14 Texas Tech | Arkansas | United Supermarkets Arena • Lubbock, TX | ESPN2 | 14,290 | Texas Tech (67-64) | Big 12 (6-4) |
Auburn, LSU, Mississippi State, and Missouri did not participate for the SEC. All times Eastern

=== SEC regular season ===
This table summarizes the head-to-head results between teams in conference play. Results updated through January 5, 2019.

| | Alabama | Arkansas | Auburn | Florida | Georgia | Kentucky | LSU | Miss. State | Missouri | Ole Miss | S. Carolina | Tennessee | Texas A&M | Vanderbilt |
| vs. Alabama | – | 1–0 | 2–0 | 1–0 | 0–1 | 0–1 | 2–0 | 1–1 | 0–1 | 0–1 | 0–1 | 1–0 | 2–0 | 0–2 |
| vs. Arkansas | 0–1 | – | 1–0 | 1–0 | 0–1 | 1–0 | 1–1 | 1–0 | 1–1 | 1–1 | 1–0 | 1–0 | 1–1 | 0–2 |
| vs. Auburn | 0–2 | 0–1 | – | 0–1 | 0–2 | 2–0 | 1–0 | 1–1 | 0–1 | 2–0 | 1–0 | 0–1 | 0–1 | 0–1 |
| vs. Florida | 0–1 | 0–1 | 1–0 | – | 1–1 | 2–0 | 1–1 | 1–0 | 0–1 | 0–1 | 1–0 | 2–0 | 0–1 | 0–2 |
| vs. Georgia | 1–0 | 1–0 | 2–0 | 1–1 | – | 1–0 | 2–0 | 1–0 | 1–0 | 2–0 | 2–0 | 1–0 | 1–0 | 0–1 |
| vs. Kentucky | 1–0 | 0–1 | 0–2 | 0–2 | 0–1 | – | 1–0 | 0–2 | 0–1 | 0–1 | 0–1 | 1–1 | 0–1 | 0–2 |
| vs. LSU | 0–2 | 1–1 | 0–1 | 1–1 | 0–2 | 0–1 | – | 0–1 | 0–1 | 0–1 | 0–1 | 0–1 | 0–2 | 0–1 |
| vs. Miss. State | 1–1 | 0–1 | 1–1 | 0–1 | 0–1 | 2–0 | 1–0 | – | 0–1 | 1–1 | 1–1 | 1–0 | 0–1 | 0–1 |
| vs. Missouri | 1–0 | 1–1 | 1–0 | 1–0 | 0–1 | 1–0 | 1–0 | 1–0 | – | 2–0 | 1–1 | 2–0 | 1–1 | 0–1 |
| vs. Ole Miss | 1–0 | 1–1 | 0–2 | 1–0 | 0–2 | 1–0 | 1–0 | 1–1 | 0–2 | – | 1–0 | 1–0 | 0–1 | 0–1 |
| vs. South Carolina | 1–0 | 0–1 | 0–1 | 0–1 | 0–2 | 1–0 | 1–0 | 1–1 | 1–1 | 0–1 | – | 2–0 | 0–2 | 0–1 |
| vs. Tennessee | 0–1 | 0–1 | 1–0 | 0–2 | 0–1 | 1–1 | 1–0 | 0–1 | 0–2 | 0–1 | 0–2 | – | 0–1 | 0–2 |
| vs. Texas A&M | 0–2 | 1–1 | 1–0 | 1–0 | 0–1 | 1–0 | 2–0 | 1–0 | 1–1 | 1–0 | 2–0 | 1–0 | – | 0–1 |
| vs. Vanderbilt | 2–0 | 2–0 | 1–0 | 2–0 | 1–0 | 2–0 | 1–0 | 1–0 | 1–0 | 1–0 | 1–0 | 2–0 | 1–0 | – |
| Total | 8–10 | 8–10 | 11–7 | 9–9 | 2–16 | 15–3 | 16–2 | 10–8 | 5–13 | 10–8 | 11–7 | 15–3 | 6–12 | 0–18 |

=== Records against other conferences ===
Regular season

| Power Conferences | Record |
|---|---|
| ACC | 7–10 |
| American | 5–5 |
| Big East | 3–4 |
| Big Ten | 3–3 |
| Big 12 | 6–13 |
| Pac-12 | 9–3 |
| Power 7 Total | 33–38 |
| Other NCAA Division I Conferences | Record |
| A-10 | 5–0 |
| America East | 1–1 |
| ASUN | 8–0 |
| Big Sky | 1–0 |
| Big South | 6–0 |
| Big West | 2–1 |
| CAA | 1–1 |
| C-USA | 7–1 |
| Horizon | 2–0 |
| Ivy | |
| MAAC | 2–0 |
| MAC | 2–1 |
| MEAC | 4–0 |
| MVC | 4–0 |
| MW | 1–1 |
| NEC | |
| OVC | 9–0 |
| Patriot | |
| SoCon | 8–1 |
| Southland | 10–0 |
| SWAC | 5–1 |
| Summit | 2–0 |
| Sun Belt | 10–2 |
| WAC | |
| WCC | 5–1 |
| Other Division I Total | 95–11 |
| NCAA Division I Total | 128–49 |
| Division II Total | 0–0 |
| Total | 0–0 |

== Postseason ==
=== SEC Tournament ===
- March 13–17 at the Bridgestone Arena, Nashville. Teams will be seeded by conference record, with ties broken by record between the tied teams followed by record against the regular-season champion, if necessary.

2019 SEC men's basketball tournament seeds and results
| Seed | School | Conf. | Over. | Tiebreaker | First round March 13 | Second round March 14 | Quarterfinals March 15 | Semifinals March 16 | Championship March 17 |
| 1. | ‡LSU | 16–2 | 26–5 | | Bye | Bye | vs. #8 Florida L, 73–76 | | |
| 2. | †Kentucky | 15–3 | 26–5 | 1–1 vs. Tennessee; 2-0 vs. Auburn | Bye | Bye | vs. #10 Alabama W, 73–55 | vs. #3 Tennessee L, 78–82 | |
| 3. | †Tennessee | 15–3 | 27–4 | 1–1 vs. Kentucky; 0-1 vs. Auburn | Bye | Bye | vs. #6 Mississippi State W, 83–76 | vs. #2 Kentucky W, 82–78 | vs. #5 Auburn L, 64–84 |
| 4. | †South Carolina | 11–7 | 16–15 | 1–0 vs. Auburn | Bye | Bye | vs. #5 Auburn L, 64–73 | | |
| 5. | #Auburn | 11–7 | 22–9 | 0–1 vs. South Carolina | Bye | vs. #12 Missouri W, 81–71 | vs. #4 South Carolina W, 73–64 | vs. #8 Florida W, 65–62 | vs. #3 Tennessee W, 84–64 |
| 6. | #Mississippi State | 10–8 | 22–9 | 1–1 vs. Ole Miss; 1–1 vs, South Carolina | Bye | vs. #11 Texas A&M W, 80–54 | vs. #3 Tennessee L, 76–83 | | |
| 7. | #Ole Miss | 10–8 | 20–11 | 1–1 vs. Mississippi State; 0–1 vs, South Carolina | Bye | vs. #10 Alabama L, 57–62 | | | |
| 8. | #Florida | 9–9 | 17–14 | | Bye | vs. #9 Arkansas W, 66–50 | vs. #1 LSU W, 76–73 | vs. #5 Auburn L, 62–65 | |
| 9. | #Arkansas | 8–10 | 17–14 | 1–0 vs. Alabama | Bye | vs. #8 Florida L, 50–66 | | | |
| 10. | #Alabama | 8–10 | 17–14 | 0–1 vs. Arkansas | Bye | vs. #7 Ole Miss W, 62–57 | vs. #2 Kentucky L, 55–73 | | |
| 11. | Texas A&M | 6–12 | 13–17 | | vs. #14 Vanderbilt W, 69–52 | vs. #6 Mississippi State L, 54–80 | | | |
| 12. | Missouri | 5–13 | 14–16 | | vs. #13 Georgia W, 71–61 | vs. #5 Auburn L, 71–81 | | | |
| 13. | Georgia | 2–16 | 11–20 | | vs. #12 Missouri L, 61–71 | | | | |
| 14. | Vanderbilt | 0–18 | 9–22 | | vs. #11 Texas A&M L, 52–69 | | | | |
‡ – SEC regular season champions, and tournament No. 1 seed. † – Received a double-Bye in the conference tournament. # – Received a single-Bye in the conference tournament. Overall records include all games played in the SEC tournament.

== Honors and awards ==
=== All-SEC Awards ===
==== Coaches ====
2019 SEC Men's Basketball Individual Awards
| Award | Recipient(s) |
| Player of the Year | Grant Williams, Tennessee |
| Coach of the Year | Kermit Davis, Ole Miss |
| Co-Defensive Player of the Year | Ashton Hagans, Kentucky & Tremont Waters, LSU |
| Freshman of the Year | Keldon Johnson, Kentucky |
| Scholar-Athlete of the Year | Skylar Mays, LSU |
| Sixth Man Award | Hassani Gravett, South Carolina |

==== Players ====
2019 SEC Men's Basketball All-Conference Teams
| First Team | Second Team | All-Freshman Team | All-Defensive Team |
| Daniel Gafford So., F, Arkansas; Admiral Schofield Jr., F, Tennessee; Chris Silva Sr., F, South Carolina; Breein Tyree Jr., G, Ole Miss; P. J. Washington So., F, Kentucky; Tremont Waters So., G, LSU; Quinndary Weatherspoon Sr., G, Mississippi State; Grant Williams So., F, Tennessee | Jordan Bone Jr., G, Tennessee; Bryce Brown Sr., G, Auburn; Nicolas Claxton So., F, Georgia; Terence Davis Jr., G, Ole Miss; Jared Harper Jr., G, Auburn; Tyler Herro Fr., G, Kentucky; Keldon Johnson Fr., F, Kentucky; Skylar Mays Jr., G, LSU | Tyler Herro Kentucky; Isaiah Joe Arkansas; Keldon Johnson Kentucky; A. J. Lawson South Carolina; Kira Lewis Alabama; Andrew Nembhard Florida; Naz Reid LSU; Reggie Perry Mississippi State | Daniel Gafford So., F, Arkansas; Ashton Hagans Fr., G, Kentucky; Donta Hall Sr., F, Alabama; Chris Silva Sr., F, South Carolina; Tremont Waters So., G, LSU |
† - denotes unanimous selection

==== AP ====
2019 SEC Men's Basketball Individual Awards
| Award | Recipient(s) |
| Player of the Year | Grant Williams, Tennessee |
| Coach of the Year | Kermit Davis, Ole Miss |
| Newcomer of the Year | Tyler Herro, Kentucky |

2019 SEC Men's Basketball All-Conference Teams
| First Team | Second Team |
| Daniel Gafford So., F, Arkansas; P. J. Washington So., F, Kentucky; Tremont Waters So., G, LSU; Quinndary Weatherspoon Sr., G, Mississippi State †Grant Williams So., F, Tennessee | Jordan Bone Jr., G, Tennessee; Jared Harper Jr., G, Auburn; Admiral Schofield Sr., F, Tennessee; Chris Silva Sr., F, South Carolina; Breein Tyree Jr., G, Ole Miss |
† - denotes unanimous selection

== NBA draft ==
| PG | Point guard | SG | Shooting guard | SF | Small forward | PF | Power forward | C | Center |

| Player | Team | Round | Pick # | Position | School |
|---|---|---|---|---|---|
| Darius Garland | Cleveland Cavaliers | 1 | 5 | PG | Vanderbilt |
| P. J. Washington | Charlotte Hornets | 1 | 12 | PF | Kentucky |
| Tyler Herro | Miami Heat | 1 | 13 | SG | Kentucky |
| Chuma Okeke | Orlando Magic | 1 | 16 | PF | Auburn |
| Grant Williams | Boston Celtics | 1 | 22 | PF | Tennessee |
| Keldon Johnson | San Antonio Spurs | 1 | 29 | SG | Kentucky |
| Nicolas Claxton | Brooklyn Nets | 2 | 31 | PF | Georgia |
| Daniel Gafford | Chicago Bulls | 2 | 28 | C | Arkansas |
| Admiral Schofield | Philadelphia 76ers | 2 | 42 | SF | Tennessee |
| Quinndary Weatherspoon | San Antonio Spurs | 2 | 49 | SG | Mississippi State |
| Tremont Waters | Charlotte Hornets | 2 | 51 | PG | LSU |
| Jordan Bone | New Orleans Pelicans | 2 | 57 | PG | Tennessee |
