= E. J. Montgomery =

American basketball player (born 1999)

E.J. Montgomery
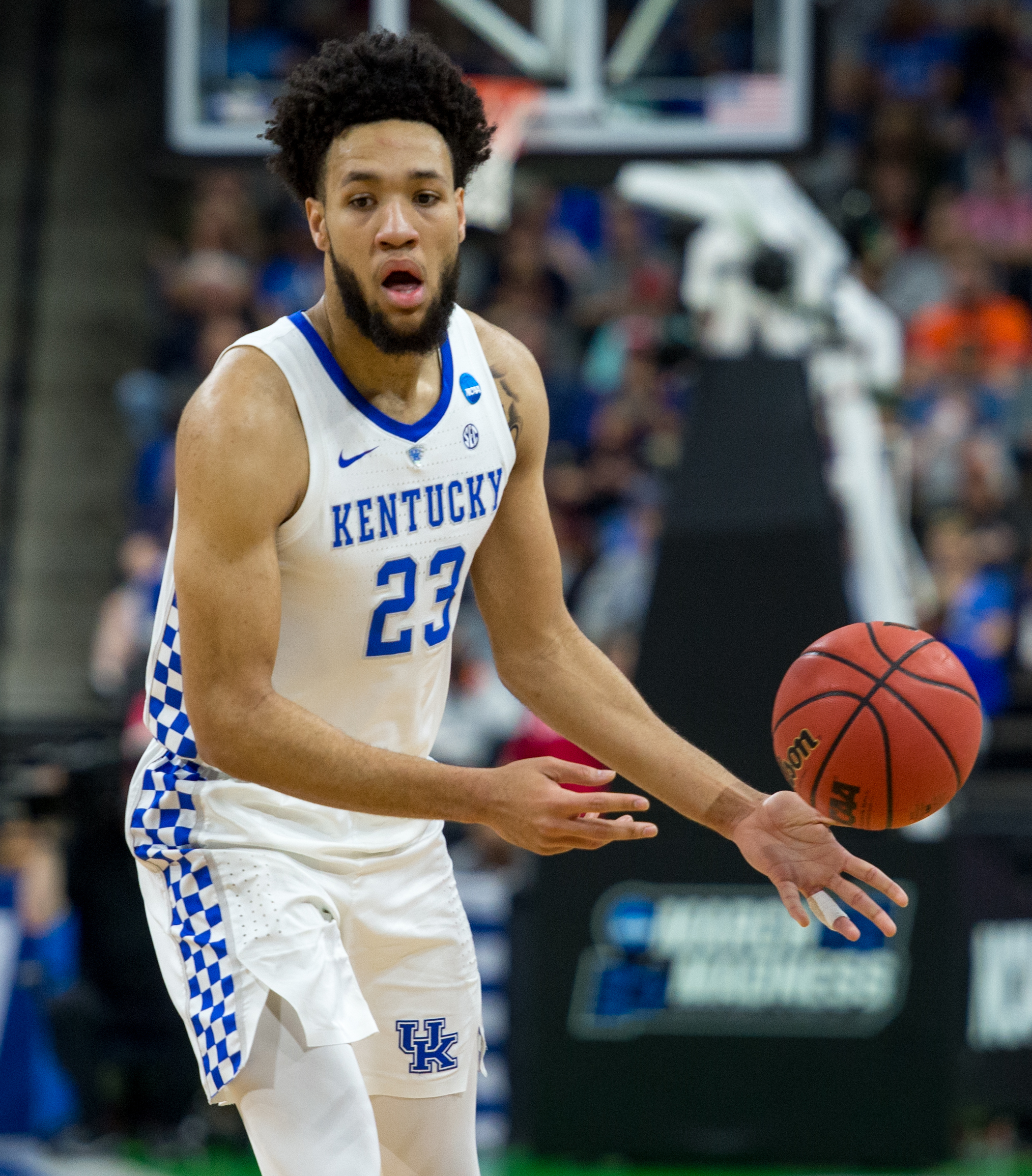
- Montgomery with Kentucky in 2019

Free Agent
- Position: Power forward

Personal information
- Born: September 12, 1999 (age 27) Fort Pierce, Florida, U.S.
- Listed height: 6 ft 10 in (2.08 m)
- Listed weight: 228 lb (103 kg)

Career information
- High school: Montverde Academy (Montverde, Florida); Wheeler (Marietta, Georgia)
- College: Kentucky (2018–2020)
- NBA draft: 2020: undrafted
- Playing career: 2021–present

Career history
- 2021: Nevėžis Kėdainiai
- 2021–2022: Soproni KC
- 2022–2024: Aomori Wat's
- 2024–2025: Birmingham Squadron
- 2025: Nadim Souaid Academy
- 2025–2026: MKS Dąbrowa Górnicza

Career highlights
- McDonald's All-American (2018)
- Stats at NBA.com
- Stats at Basketball Reference

Efrem Reynard Montgomery Jr. (born September 12, 1999) is an American basketball player who last played for MKS Dąbrowa Górnicza of the Polish Basketball League (PLK). He played college basketball for the Kentucky Wildcats.

== High school career ==
Montgomery attended Lincoln Park Academy in Fort Pierce, Florida for middle school and started playing at the varsity level as a 6'8" seventh grader. As an eighth grader, Montgomery and the Greyhounds won the Florida District 12-4A championship.

Montgomery first attended Montverde Academy for his freshmen and sophomore year, where he played alongside current Net Ben Simmons.

He later transferred to Wheeler High School for his junior and senior year. He averaged 25.6 points, 13.6 rebounds, and 4.3 assists at Wheeler.

=== Recruiting ===
Montgomery originally committed to Auburn University on September 22, 2016. However, when Auburn was involved in the college basketball corruption scandal, Montgomery decommitted on September 27, 2017.

On April 9, 2018, Montgomery committed to play college basketball at the University of Kentucky.

College recruiting
Name	Hometown	School	Height	Weight	Commit date
E.J. Montgomery; PF	Fort Pierce, FL	Wheeler (GA)	6 ft 10 in (2.08 m)	215 lb (98 kg)	Apr 9, 2018
E.J. Montgomery; PF	Recruit ratings: Rivals: 247Sports: ESPN: (93)				
Overall recruit ranking: Rivals: 11 247Sports: 6 ESPN: 14
Note: In many cases, Scout, Rivals, 247Sports, On3, and ESPN may conflict in their listings of height and weight.; In these cases, the average was taken. ESPN grades are on a 100-point scale.; Sources: "Kentucky 2018 Basketball Commitments". Rivals.; "2018 Kentucky Wildcats Recruiting Class". ESPN.; "2018 Team Ranking". Rivals.

== College career ==
Montgomery had his first double-double of 11 points and 13 rebounds in a win over South Carolina. As a freshman, Montgomery averaged 3.8 points and 4.1 rebounds per game. On December 7, 2019, Montgomery scored a career-high 25 points as Kentucky defeated Fairleigh Dickinson 83–52. In the regular season finale versus Florida, Montgomery hit the game-winning tip-in with 11 seconds left. He averaged 6.1 points, 5.4 rebounds, and 1.1 blocks per game. Following the season, he declared for the 2020 NBA draft.

== Professional career ==
After going undrafted in the 2020 NBA draft, Montgomery signed with the Milwaukee Bucks. He was waived on December 17.

On January 4, 2021, he signed with Nevėžis-OPTIBET of the Lithuanian Basketball League. On September 1, Montgomery signed with Soproni KC of the Nemzeti Bajnokság I/A.

On August 3, 2022, Montgomery signed with Aomori Wat's of the Japanese B.League.

On October 28, 2024, Montgomery joined the Birmingham Squadron.

On August 15, 2025, he signed with MKS Dąbrowa Górnicza of the Polish Basketball League (PLK).

== Career statistics ==
Legend
GP	Games played	GS	Games started	MPG	Minutes per game
FG%	Field goal percentage	3P%	3-point field goal percentage	FT%	Free throw percentage
RPG	Rebounds per game	APG	Assists per game	SPG	Steals per game
BPG	Blocks per game	PPG	Points per game	**Bold**	Career high

=== College ===
Year	Team	GP	GS	MPG	FG%	3P%	FT%	RPG	APG	SPG	BPG	PPG
2018–19	Kentucky	**37**	10	15.1	.480	**.200**	.567	4.1	.4	**.4**	1.0	3.8
2019–20	Kentucky	28	**25**	**24.1**	**.518**	.167	**.667**	**5.4**	**.6**	**.4**	**1.1**	**6.1**
Career		65	35	19.0	.500	.188	.625	4.6	.5	.4	1.1	4.8

== Personal life ==
E.J. is the son of Efrem and Glenda Montgomery and has two sisters Brittni and Brandy.
