= 2018–19 Tennessee Volunteers basketball team =

American college basketball season

2018–19 Tennessee Volunteers basketball

NCAA tournament, Sweet Sixteen
- Conference: Southeastern Conference

Ranking
- Coaches: No. 10
- AP: No. 6
- Record: 31–6 (15–3 SEC)
- Head coach: Rick Barnes (4th season)
- Assistant coaches: Rob Lanier; Desmond Oliver; Michael Schwartz
- Home arena: Thompson–Boling Arena

2018–19 Southeastern Conference men's basketball standings
	Conf.				Overall
Team	W		L	PCT	W		L	PCT
No. 15 LSU	16	–	2	.889	28	–	7	.800
No. 10 Tennessee	15	–	3	.833	31	–	6	.838
No. 7 Kentucky	15	–	3	.833	30	–	7	.811
No. 5 Auburn†	11	–	7	.611	30	–	10	.750
South Carolina	11	–	7	.611	16	–	16	.500
Mississippi State	10	–	8	.556	23	–	11	.676
Ole Miss	10	–	8	.556	20	–	13	.606
Florida	9	–	9	.500	20	–	16	.556
Alabama	8	–	10	.444	18	–	16	.529
Arkansas	8	–	10	.444	18	–	16	.529
Texas A&M	6	–	12	.333	14	–	18	.438
Missouri	5	–	13	.278	15	–	17	.469
Georgia	2	–	16	.111	11	–	21	.344
Vanderbilt	0	–	18	.000	9	–	23	.281
† 2019 SEC tournament winner Rankings from AP Poll

The 2018–19 Tennessee Volunteers basketball team represented the University of Tennessee in the 2018–19 NCAA Division I men's basketball season. The Volunteers were led by fourth-year head coach Rick Barnes. The team played its home games at Thompson–Boling Arena in Knoxville, Tennessee, as a member of the Southeastern Conference. They finished the season 31–6, 15–3 to finish in 2nd place. In the SEC Tournament, they defeated Mississippi State and Kentucky to make it to the championship. In the championship, they lost to Auburn. They received an at-large bid to the NCAA Tournament where they defeated Colgate in the First Round, Iowa in the Second Round before losing in the Sweet Sixteen to Purdue.

== Previous season ==
The Vols finished the 2017–18 NCAA Division I men's basketball season 26–9, 13–5 in SEC play to earn a share of the SEC regular season championship. As the No. 2 seed in the SEC tournament, they defeated Mississippi State and Arkansas before losing to Kentucky in the championship game. They received an at-large bid to the NCAA tournament as the No. 3 seed in the South region. There the Volunteers defeated Wright State before being upset by Loyola–Chicago in the Second Round.

== Offseason ==
=== Departures ===
Name	Number	Pos.	Height	Weight	Year	Hometown	Reason for departure
James Daniel III	3	G	6'0"	175	RS Senior	Hampton, VA	Graduated
Chris Darrington	32	G	6'1"	179	Junior	Toledo, OH	Transferred to Toledo

=== 2018 recruiting class ===
College recruiting information
Name	Hometown	School	Height	Weight	Commit date
D. J. Burns; C	Rock Hill, SC	York Preparatory School	6 ft 9 in (2.06 m)	248 lb (112 kg)	Jun 1, 2018
D. J. Burns; C	Recruit ratings: Rivals: 247Sports: ESPN: (86)				
Overall recruit ranking: Scout: NR Rivals: NR 247Sports: NR ESPN: NR
Note: In many cases, Scout, Rivals, 247Sports, On3, and ESPN may conflict in their listings of height and weight.; In these cases, the average was taken. ESPN grades are on a 100-point scale.; Sources: "Rivals.com 2018 Tennessee Basketball Commitments". Rivals.; "2018 Team Ranking". Rivals.

== Roster ==
2018–19 Tennessee Volunteers men's basketball team
Players
Coaches

Pos.	#	Name	Height	Weight	Year	Previous school	Hometown
G	0	Jordan Bone	6 ft 3 in (1.91 m)	180 lb (82 kg)	Jr	The Ensworth School	Nashville, Tennessee
G	1	Lamonte Turner	6 ft 2 in (1.88 m)	195 lb (88 kg)	RS Jr	IMG Academy	Florence, Alabama
F	2	Grant Williams	6 ft 7 in (2.01 m)	236 lb (107 kg)	Jr	Providence Day School	Charlotte, North Carolina
G	4	Jacob Fleschman (W)	6 ft 3 in (1.91 m)	170 lb (77 kg)	RS So	Westlake High School	Austin, Texas
F	5	Admiral Schofield	6 ft 6 in (1.98 m)	241 lb (109 kg)	Sr	Zion-Benton Township High School	Zion, Illinois
F	10	John Fulkerson	6 ft 9 in (2.06 m)	197 lb (89 kg)	RS So	Christ School	Kingsport, Tennessee
F	11	Kyle Alexander	6 ft 11 in (2.11 m)	222 lb (101 kg)	Sr	Orangeville Prep	Milton, Ontario, Canada
G	12	Brad Woodson (W)	6 ft 1 in (1.85 m)	177 lb (80 kg)	Sr	Riverdale High School	Murfreesboro, Tennessee
G	13	Jalen Johnson	6 ft 6 in (1.98 m)	187 lb (85 kg)	RS So	Wesleyan Christian Academy	Durham, North Carolina
F	15	Derrick Walker	6 ft 8 in (2.03 m)	236 lb (107 kg)	So	Sunrise Christian Academy	Kansas City, Missouri
G	23	Jordan Bowden	6 ft 5 in (1.96 m)	193 lb (88 kg)	Jr	Carter High School	Knoxville, Tennessee
G	24	Lucas Campbell (W)	6 ft 4 in (1.93 m)	185 lb (84 kg)	Sr	Christian Academy of Knoxville	Knoxville, Tennessee
F	32	D. J. Burns	6 ft 9 in (2.06 m)	272 lb (123 kg)	Fr	York Preparatory Academy	Rock Hill, South Carolina
F	33	Zach Kent	6 ft 11 in (2.11 m)	225 lb (102 kg)	RS Fr	Blair Academy	Magnolia, Delaware
F	34	Brock Jancek (W)	6 ft 8 in (2.03 m)	212 lb (96 kg)	Fr	Knoxville Catholic High School	Knoxville, Tennessee
G/F	35	Yves Pons	6 ft 6 in (1.98 m)	209 lb (95 kg)	So	INSEP Academy	Fuveau, France

Head coach

- Rick Barnes (Lenoir–Rhyne)

Assistant coach(es)

- Rob Lanier (St. Bonaventure)
- Desmond Oliver (Dominican (NY))
- Michael Schwartz (Texas)

Legend

- (C) Team captain
- (S) Suspended
- (I) Ineligible
- (W) Walk-on
- Injured
- Current redshirt

Roster

=== Depth chart ===
Pos.	Starting 5	Bench 1	Bench 2	Bench 3
F/C	Kyle Alexander	John Fulkerson	Zach Kent
F	Grant Williams	Derrick Walker	D. J. Burns	Brock Jancek (W)
G/F	Admiral Schofield	Yves Pons	Lucas Campbell (W)
G	Lamonte Turner	Jalen Johnson	Jacob Fleschman (W)
PG	Jordan Bone	Jordan Bowden	Brad Woodson (W)

== Schedule and results ==
Date time, TV	Rank^{#}	Opponent^{#}	Result	Record	High points	High rebounds	High assists	Site (attendance) city, state
Exhibition
October 31, 2018*; 7:00 pm, SECN+	No. 6	Tusculum	W 87–48		16 – Bowden	7 – Walker	5 – Fulkerson	Thompson–Boling Arena (4,439); Knoxville, TN
Regular season
November 6, 2018*; 7:00 pm, SECN	No. 6	Lenoir–Rhyne; NIT Season Tip-Off campus game	W 86–41	1–0	18 – Bone	9 – Schofield	6 – Bowden	Thompson–Boling Arena (16,156); Knoxville, TN
November 9, 2018*; 7:00 pm, SECN+	No. 6	Louisiana; NIT Season Tip-Off campus game	W 87–65	2–0	31 – Williams	10 – Williams	8 – Bone	Thompson–Boling Arena (16,864); Knoxville, TN
November 13, 2018*; 9:00 pm, ESPN2	No. 5	Georgia Tech	W 66–53	3–0	22 – Williams	11 – Bowden	4 – Schofield	Thompson–Boling Arena (16,219); Knoxville, TN
November 21, 2018*; 5:00 pm, ESPN2	No. 5	vs. Louisville; NIT Season Tip-Off semifinals	W 92–81	4–0	24 – Williams	9 – Williams	6 – Bone	Barclays Center (4,981); Brooklyn, NY
November 23, 2018*; 9:00 pm, ESPN2	No. 5	vs. No. 2 Kansas; NIT Season Tip-Off championship	L 81–87 ^{OT}	4–1	21 – Schofield	8 – Williams	6 – Williams	Barclays Center (5,491); Brooklyn, NY
November 28, 2018*; 6:30 pm, SECN	No. 6	Eastern Kentucky	W 95–67	5–1	21 – Williams	11 – Williams	7 – Bone	Thompson–Boling Arena (15,036); Knoxville, TN
December 2, 2018*; 12:00 pm, SECN	No. 6	Texas A&M–Corpus Christi	W 79–51	6–1	16 – Schofield	10 – Alexander	10 – Bone	Thompson–Boling Arena (14,730); Knoxville, TN
December 9, 2018*; 3:00 pm, ESPN	No. 7	vs. No. 1 Gonzaga; Jerry Colangelo Classic	W 76–73	7–1	30 – Schofield	12 – Williams	9 – Bone	Talking Stick Resort Arena (10,172); Phoenix, AZ
December 15, 2018*; 12:00 pm, ESPN2	No. 3	at Memphis	W 102–92	8–1	29 – Schofield	11 – Schofield	6 – Bowden	FedEx Forum (18,528); Memphis, TN
December 19, 2018*; 7:00 pm, SECN+	No. 3	Samford	W 83–70	9–1	24 – Bone	9 – Pons	11 – Bone	Thompson–Boling Arena (15,794); Knoxville, TN
December 22, 2018*; 12:00 pm, ESPN2	No. 3	Wake Forest	W 83–64	10–1	22 – Williams	10 – Williams	5 – Bone	Thompson–Boling Arena (19,846); Knoxville, TN
December 29, 2018*; 1:00 pm, SECN+	No. 3	Tennessee Tech	W 96–53	11–1	25 – Williams	7 – Williams	3 – Bone	Thompson–Boling Arena (21,165); Knoxville, TN
January 5, 2019; 3:30 pm, SECN	No. 3	Georgia	W 96–50	12–1 (1–0)	20 – Bowden	14 – Alexander	5 – Tied	Thompson–Boling Arena (21,678); Knoxville, TN
January 8, 2019; 8:00 pm, ESPN2	No. 3	at Missouri	W 87–63	13–1 (2–0)	20 – Bowden	17 – Alexander	5 – Bone	Mizzou Arena (10,165); Columbia, MO
January 12, 2019; 6:00 pm, ESPN	No. 3	at Florida	W 78–67	14–1 (3–0)	20 – Williams	9 – Williams	5 – Bone	Exactech Arena (10,923); Gainesville, FL
January 15, 2019; 7:00 pm, ESPN2	No. 3	Arkansas	W 106–87	15–1 (4–0)	21 – Turner	7 – Williams	8 – Bone	Thompson–Boling Arena (19,282); Knoxville, TN
January 19, 2019; 2:00 pm, ESPN2	No. 3	Alabama	W 71–68	16–1 (5–0)	21 – Williams	11 – Schofield	7 – Bone	Thompson–Boling Arena (21,957); Knoxville, TN
January 23, 2019; 7:00 pm, ESPN2	No. 1	at Vanderbilt	W 88–83 ^{OT}	17–1 (6–0)	43 – Williams	8 – Williams	7 – Bone	Memorial Gymnasium (14,316); Nashville, TN
January 26, 2019*; 4:00 pm, ESPN	No. 1	West Virginia; Big 12/SEC Challenge	W 83–66	18–1	23 – Turner	10 – Schofield	5 – Tied	Thompson–Boling Arena (22,149); Knoxville, TN
January 29, 2019; 6:30 pm, SECN	No. 1	at South Carolina	W 92–70	19–1 (7–0)	24 – Schofield	9 – Tied	9 – Bone	Colonial Life Arena (18,000); Columbia, SC
February 2, 2019; 8:00 pm, ESPN	No. 1	at Texas A&M	W 93–76	20–1 (8–0)	22 – Williams	10 – Williams	10 – Bone	Reed Arena (10,234); College Station, TX
February 5, 2019; 9:00 pm, ESPN2	No. 1	Missouri	W 72–60	21–1 (9–0)	13 – Tied	8 – Alexander	7 – Bone	Thompson–Boling Arena (17,264); Knoxville, TN
February 9, 2019; 4:00 pm, ESPN	No. 1	Florida	W 73–61	22–1 (10–0)	16 – Williams	6 – Tied	5 – Bone	Thompson–Boling Arena (22,261); Knoxville, TN
February 13, 2019; 6:30 pm, SECN	No. 1	South Carolina	W 85–73	23–1 (11–0)	21 – Schofield	10 – Schofield	7 – Williams	Thompson–Boling Arena (19,407); Knoxville, TN
February 16, 2019; 8:00 pm, ESPN	No. 1	at No. 5 Kentucky; Rivalry/ESPN College GameDay	L 69–86	23–2 (11–1)	19 – Bone	8 – Williams	6 – Bone	Rupp Arena (24,467); Lexington, KY
February 19, 2019; 7:00 pm, ESPN	No. 5	Vanderbilt	W 58–46	24–2 (12–1)	14 – Williams	11 – Williams	6 – Bone	Thompson–Boling Arena (20,523); Knoxville, TN
February 23, 2019; 12:00 pm, ESPN	No. 5	at No. 13 LSU	L 80–82 ^{OT}	24–3 (12–2)	27 – Schofield	9 – Schofield	3 – Williams	Pete Maravich Assembly Center (13,581); Baton Rouge, LA
February 27, 2019; 7:00 pm, SECN	No. 7	at Ole Miss	W 73–71	25–3 (13–2)	21 – Williams	6 – Tied	4 – Tied	The Pavilion at Ole Miss (9,500); Oxford, MS
March 2, 2019; 2:00 pm, CBS	No. 7	No. 4 Kentucky; Rivalry	W 71–52	26–3 (14–2)	27 – Bone	7 – Tied	6 – Turner	Thompson–Boling Arena (21,729); Knoxville, TN
March 5, 2019; 9:00 pm, SECN	No. 5	Mississippi State	W 71–54	27–3 (15–2)	18 – Schofield	10 – Tied	6 – Tied	Thompson–Boling Arena (20,555); Knoxville, TN
March 9, 2019; 12:00 pm, ESPN	No. 5	at Auburn	L 80–84	27–4 (15–3)	25 – Williams	9 – Tied	7 – Bone	Auburn Arena (9,121); Auburn, AL
SEC Tournament
March 15, 2019; 9:30 pm, SECN	(3) No. 8	vs. (6) Mississippi State; Quarterfinals	W 83–76	28–4	20 – Schofield	9 – Alexander	9 – Bone	Bridgestone Arena (19,575); Nashville, TN
March 16, 2019; 3:30 pm, ESPN	(3) No. 8	vs. (2) No. 4 Kentucky; Semifinals	W 82–78	29–4	21 – Schofield	7 – Williams	5 – Tied	Bridgestone Arena (20,933); Nashville, TN
March 17, 2019; 1:00 pm, ESPN	(3) No. 8	vs. (5) No. 22 Auburn; Championship	L 64–84	29–5	24 – Turner	8 – Williams	2 – Tied	Bridgestone Arena (19,452); Nashville, TN
NCAA tournament
March 22, 2019*; 2:45 pm, CBS	(2 S) No. 6	vs. (15 S) Colgate; First Round	W 77–70	30–5	19 – Schofield	3 – Bone	6 – Turner	Nationwide Arena (19,641); Columbus, OH
March 24, 2019*; 12:10 pm, CBS	(2 S) No. 6	vs. (10 S) Iowa; Second Round	W 83–77 ^{OT}	31–5	19 – Tied	9 – Alexander	5 – Williams	Nationwide Arena (19,610); Columbus, OH
March 28, 2019*; 7:29 pm, TBS	(2 S) No. 6	vs. (3 S) No. 13 Purdue; Sweet Sixteen	L 94–99 ^{OT}	31–6	21 – Schofield	9 – Schofield	4 – Tied	KFC Yum! Center (19,831); Louisville, KY
*Non-conference game. ^{#}Rankings from AP Poll. (#) Tournament seedings in parentheses. S=South. All times are in Eastern Time.

== Rankings ==
Ranking movements Legend: ██ Increase in ranking ██ Decrease in ranking т = Tied with team above or below ( ) = First-place votes
	Week																				
Poll	Pre	1	2	3	4	5	6	7	8	9	10	11	12	13	14	15	16	17	18	19	Final
AP	6	5 (1)	5 (1)	6	7	3 (1)	3 (2)	3 (12)	3 (12)	3 (13)	3 (13)	1 (48)	1 (48)	1 (48)	1 (40)	5	7	5	8	6	Not released
Coaches	6	6^	5	7	7	4	4	3 (7)	3 (7)	3 (6)	3 (7)	1 (30)	1 (31)	1 (32)	1 (30)	6	7	4-T	8	5	10

^Coaches' Poll did not release a second poll at the same time as the AP.
*AP does not release post-NCAA Tournament rankings
