= 2018–19 Florida Gators men's basketball team =

American college basketball season

2018–19 Florida Gators men's basketball

NCAA tournament, Second Round
- Conference: Southeastern Conference
- Record: 20–16 (9–9 SEC)
- Head coach: Mike White (4th season)
- Associate head coach: Al Pinkins
- Assistant coaches: Jordan Mincy; Darris Nichols
- Home arena: Exactech Arena at the Stephen C. O'Connell Center

2018–19 Southeastern Conference men's basketball standings
	Conf.				Overall
Team	W		L	PCT	W		L	PCT
No. 15 LSU	16	–	2	.889	28	–	7	.800
No. 10 Tennessee	15	–	3	.833	31	–	6	.838
No. 7 Kentucky	15	–	3	.833	30	–	7	.811
No. 5 Auburn†	11	–	7	.611	30	–	10	.750
South Carolina	11	–	7	.611	16	–	16	.500
Mississippi State	10	–	8	.556	23	–	11	.676
Ole Miss	10	–	8	.556	20	–	13	.606
Florida	9	–	9	.500	20	–	16	.556
Alabama	8	–	10	.444	18	–	16	.529
Arkansas	8	–	10	.444	18	–	16	.529
Texas A&M	6	–	12	.333	14	–	18	.438
Missouri	5	–	13	.278	15	–	17	.469
Georgia	2	–	16	.111	11	–	21	.344
Vanderbilt	0	–	18	.000	9	–	23	.281
† 2019 SEC tournament winner Rankings from AP Poll

The 2018–19 Florida Gators men's basketball team represented the University of Florida in the 2018–19 NCAA Division I men's basketball season. The Gators were led by fourth-year head coach Mike White and played their home games in the Exactech Arena at the Stephen C. O'Connell Center on the university's Gainesville, Florida campus as members of the Southeastern Conference. They finished 20–16, 9–9 to finish 8th please. In the SEC Tournament, they defeated Arkansas, beat LSU in quarterfinals before losing to Auburn in the semifinals. They received a at-large bid to the NCAA Tournament where they defeated Nevada in the First Round before losing in the Second Round to Michigan.

== Previous season ==
The Gators finished the 2017–18 season 21–13, 11–7 in SEC play to finish in third place. They lost in the quarterfinals of the SEC tournament to Arkansas. They received an at-large bid to the NCAA tournament where they defeated St. Bonaventure in the First Round before losing in the Second Round to Texas Tech.

== Offseason ==
=== Departures ===
Name	Number	Pos.	Height	Weight	Year	Hometown	Reason for departure
Egor Koulechov	4	G/F	6'5"	205	RS SR	Volgograd, Russia	Graduated
John Egbunu	15	C	6'11"	265	RS SR	Bauchi, Nigeria	Graduated
Chris Chiozza	11	G	6'0"	175	SR	Memphis, Tennessee	Graduated

=== 2018 recruiting class ===
College recruiting information
Name	Hometown	School	Height	Weight	Commit date
Andrew Nembhard; PG	Aurora, ON	Montverde Academy	6 ft 4 in (1.93 m)	185 lb (84 kg)	Oct 2, 2017
Andrew Nembhard; PG	Recruit ratings: Scout: Rivals: 247Sports: ESPN: (87)				
Noah Locke; SG	Owings Mills, MD	McDonogh School	6 ft 2 in (1.88 m)	160 lb (73 kg)	Oct 3, 2017
Noah Locke; SG	Recruit ratings: Scout: Rivals: 247Sports: ESPN: (84)				
Keyontae Johnson; SF	Norfolk, VA	Oak Hill Academy	6 ft 5 in (1.96 m)	190 lb (86 kg)	Nov 10, 2017
Keyontae Johnson; SF	Recruit ratings: Scout: Rivals: 247Sports: ESPN: (81)				
Overall recruit ranking:
Note: In many cases, Scout, Rivals, 247Sports, On3, and ESPN may conflict in their listings of height and weight.; In these cases, the average was taken. ESPN grades are on a 100-point scale.; Sources: "2018 Florida Basketball Commits". Scout.; "Scout.com Team Recruiting Rankings". Scout.; "2017 Team Ranking". Rivals.

== Roster ==
2018–19 Florida Gators men's basketball team
Players
Coaches

Pos.	#	Name	Height	Weight	Year	Previous school	Hometown
G	0	Mike Okauru	6 ft 3 in (1.91 m)	184 lb (83 kg)	So	Brewster Academy	Raleigh, North Carolina
F	1	Chase Johnson	6 ft 9 in (2.06 m)	219 lb (99 kg)	RS Fr	Huntington Prep School	Ripley, West Virginia
G	2	Andrew Nembhard	6 ft 5 in (1.96 m)	191 lb (87 kg)	Fr	Montverde Academy	Aurora, Ontario
G	3	Jalen Hudson	6 ft 6 in (1.98 m)	195 lb (88 kg)	RS Sr	Virginia Tech	Richmond, Virginia
G	5	KeVaughn Allen	6 ft 2 in (1.88 m)	193 lb (88 kg)	Sr	North Little Rock High School	Little Rock, Arkansas
G	10	Noah Locke	6 ft 3 in (1.91 m)	205 lb (93 kg)	Fr	McDonogh School	Randallstown, Maryland
F	11	Keyontae Johnson	6 ft 5 in (1.96 m)	225 lb (102 kg)	Fr	Oak Hill Academy	Norfolk, Virginia
C	12	Gorjok Gak (injured)	6 ft 11 in (2.11 m)	254 lb (115 kg)	Jr	Victory Rock Prep	Sydney, Australia
C	13	Kevarrius Hayes	6 ft 9 in (2.06 m)	227 lb (103 kg)	Sr	Suwannee High School	Live Oak, Florida
G	14	Mak Krause (W)	6 ft 2 in (1.88 m)	172 lb (78 kg)	Sr	St. Pius X Catholic High School	Atlanta, Georgia
F	15	Isaiah Stokes	6 ft 8 in (2.03 m)	270 lb (122 kg)	RS Fr	IMG Academy	Aurora, Ontario
F	21	Dontay Bassett	6 ft 9 in (2.06 m)	237 lb (108 kg)	RS So	Oldsmar Christian School	Oakland, California
G	22	Andrew Fava (W)	5 ft 10 in (1.78 m)	171 lb (78 kg)	So	Loyola Blakefield	Baltimore, Maryland
G	24	Deaundrae Ballard	6 ft 5 in (1.96 m)	197 lb (89 kg)	So	Southwest Atlanta Christian Academy	Atlanta, Georgia
F	25	Keith Stone	6 ft 8 in (2.03 m)	253 lb (115 kg)	RS Jr	Zion Lutheran Christian School	Deerfield Beach, Florida

Head coach

- Mike White (Mississippi)

Assistant coach(es)

- Al Pinkens (NC State)
- Jordan Mincy (Kent State)
- Darris Nichols (West Virginia)

Legend

- (C) Team captain
- (S) Suspended
- (I) Ineligible
- (W) Walk-on
- Injured
- Current redshirt

Roster

== Schedule and results ==
Date time, TV	Rank^{#}	Opponent^{#}	Result	Record	High points	High rebounds	High assists	Site (attendance) city, state
Exhibition
October 30, 2018*; 7:00 pm		Florida Southern	W 95–70	–	14 – Hudson	10 – Stone	4 – Tied	O'Connell Center (8,025); Gainesville, FL
Regular season
November 6, 2018*; 9:00 pm, ESPN2		at No. 17 Florida State; Sunshine Showdown	L 60–81	0–1	13 – Ballard	8 – Stone	4 – Nembhard	Donald L. Tucker Center (11,103); Tallahassee, FL
November 9, 2018*; 7:00 pm, SECN+		Charleston Southern; Battle 4 Atlantis campus game	W 76–46	1–1	14 – Allen	7 – Nembhard	6 – Nembhard	O'Connell Center (10,072); Gainesville, FL
November 14, 2018*; 7:00 pm, SECN+		La Salle	W 82–69	2–1	15 – Hudson	6 – Hayes	7 – Nembhard	O'Connell Center (8,450); Gainesville, FL
November 21, 2018*; 12:00 pm, ESPN		vs. Oklahoma; Battle 4 Atlantis quarterfinal	L 60–65	2–2	14 – Bassett	7 – Tied	6 – Nembhard	Imperial Arena (1,401); Nassau, Bahamas
November 22, 2018*; 7:00 pm, ESPN2		vs. Stanford; Battle 4 Atlantis consolation round	W 72–49	3–2	19 – Ballard	8 – Hayes	5 – Nembhard	Imperial Arena (1,109); Nassau, Bahamas
November 23, 2018*; 9:30 pm, ESPNU		vs. Butler; Battle 4 Atlantis 5th place game	L 54–61	3–3	11 – Tied	6 – Hayes	7 – Nembhard	Imperial Arena (1,140); Nassau, Bahamas
November 27, 2018*; 7:00 pm, SECN		North Florida	W 98–66	4–3	18 – Locke	6 – Hudson	11 – Nembhard	O'Connell Center (8,505); Gainesville, FL
December 4, 2018*; 9:00 pm, ESPN		vs. West Virginia; Jimmy V Classic	W 66–56	5–3	19 – Allen	8 – Stone	7 – Nembhard	Madison Square Garden (8,499); New York, NY
December 8, 2018*; 12:00 pm, CBS		No. 10 Michigan State	L 59–63	5–4	13 – Tied	8 – Hayes	3 – Nembhard	O'Connell Center (10,423); Gainesville, FL
December 18, 2018*; 8:00 pm, SECN		Mercer	W 71–63	6–4	18 – Locke	11 – Hayes	7 – Nembhard	O'Connell Center (8,043); Gainesville, FL
December 22, 2018*; 5:00 pm, FS2/FSSUN		vs. Florida Gulf Coast; Orange Bowl Basketball Classic	W 77–56	7–4	15 – Locke	7 – Hayes	4 – Nembhard	BB&T Center (8,914); Sunrise, FL
December 29, 2018*; 4:00 pm, ESPNU		Butler	W 77–43	8–4	12 – Tied	8 – Johnson	3 – Tied	O'Connell Center (9,814); Gainesville, FL
January 5, 2019; 7:00 pm, ESPN2		South Carolina	L 69–71	8–5 (0–1)	17 – Locke	6 – Johnson	7 – Nembhard	O'Connell Center (10,230); Gainesville, FL
January 9, 2019; 8:30 pm, SECN		at Arkansas	W 57–51	9–5 (1–1)	19 – Allen	6 – Hudson	4 – Nembhard	Bud Walton Arena (17,160); Fayetteville, AR
January 12, 2019; 6:00 pm, ESPN		No. 3 Tennessee	L 67–78	9–6 (1–2)	18 – Allen	7 – Hayes	5 – Nembhard	O'Connell Center (10,923); Gainesville, FL
January 15, 2019; 7:00 pm, SECN		at No. 24 Mississippi State	L 68–71	9–7 (1–3)	17 – Allen	8 – Hayes	8 – Nembhard	Humphrey Coliseum (7,501); Starkville, MS
January 19, 2019; 12:00 pm, CBS		at Georgia	W 62–52	10–7 (2–3)	13 – Allen	9 – Hayes	5 – Nembhard	Stegeman Coliseum (10,023); Athens, GA
January 22, 2019; 8:30 pm, SECN		Texas A&M	W 81–72	11–7 (3–3)	31 – Allen	9 – Johnson	11 – Nembhard	O'Connell Center (9,063); Gainesville, FL
January 26, 2019*; 12:00 pm, ESPN2		at TCU; Big 12/SEC Challenge	L 50–55	11–8	11 – Allen	8 – Johnson	5 – Allen	Schollmaier Arena (6,682); Fort Worth, TX
January 30, 2019; 6:30 pm, SECN		Ole Miss	W 90–86 ^{OT}	12–8 (4–3)	22 – Locke	8 – Hayes	6 – Nembhard	O'Connell Center (9,380); Gainesville, FL
February 2, 2019; 4:00 pm, ESPN		No. 7 Kentucky; Rivalry	L 54–65	12–9 (4–4)	12 – Nembhard	10 – Johnson	3 – Nembhard	O'Connell Center (10,763); Gainesville, FL
February 5, 2019; 9:00 pm, ESPNU		at Auburn	L 62–76	12–10 (4–5)	11 – Hayes	10 – Johnson	3 – Allen	Auburn Arena (7,714); Auburn, AL
February 9, 2019; 4:00 pm, ESPN		at No. 1 Tennessee	L 61–73	12–11 (4–6)	17 – Locke	9 – Hayes	5 – Nembhard	Thompson–Boling Arena (22,261); Knoxville, TN
February 13, 2019; 9:00 pm, ESPNU		Vanderbilt	W 66–57	13–11 (5–6)	15 – Johnson	9 – Johnson	1 – Tied	O'Connell Center (9,007); Gainesville, FL
February 16, 2019; 2:00 pm, ESPNU		at Alabama	W 71–53	14–11 (6–6)	21 – Nembhard	13 – Johnson	3 – Allen	Coleman Coliseum (12,148); Tuscaloosa, AL
February 20, 2019; 7:00 pm, ESPN2		at No. 13 LSU	W 82–77 ^{OT}	15–11 (7–6)	21 – Allen	7 – Hayes	8 – Nembhard	Pete Maravich Assembly Center (10,976); Baton Rouge, LA
February 23, 2019; 4:00 pm, ESPNU		Missouri	W 64–60	16–11 (8–6)	17 – Allen	7 – Johnson	4 – Nembhard	O'Connell Center (10,450); Gainesville, FL
February 27, 2019; 9:00 pm, SECN		at Vanderbilt	W 71–55	17–11 (9–6)	19 – Nembhard	6 – Johnson	3 – Locke	Memorial Gymnasium (8,583); Nashville, TN
March 2, 2019; 8:30 pm, SECN		Georgia	L 55–61	17–12 (9–7)	13 – Hudson	6 – Hayes	4 – Tied	O'Connell Center (9,328); Gainesville, FL
March 6, 2019; 7:00 pm, ESPN2		No. 10 LSU	L 78–79 ^{OT}	17–13 (9–8)	33 – Hudson	15 – Hayes	4 – Nembhard	O'Connell Center (9,550); Gainesville, FL
March 9, 2019; 2:00 pm, CBS		at No. 6 Kentucky; Rivalry	L 57–66	17–14 (9–9)	19 – Hayes	6 – Hudson	8 – Nembhard	Rupp Arena (24,456); Lexington, KY
SEC Tournament
March 14, 2019; 1:00 pm, SECN	(8)	vs. (9) Arkansas; Second Round	W 66–50	18–14	20 – Johnson	12 – Johnson	8 – Nembhard	Bridgestone Arena (12,720); Nashville, TN
March 15, 2019; 1:00 pm, ESPN	(8)	vs. (1) No. 9 LSU; Quarterfinals	W 76–73	19–14	20 – Nembhard	10 – Johnson	6 – Nembhard	Bridgestone Arena (16,490); Nashville, TN
March 16, 2019; 1:00 pm, ESPN	(8)	vs. (5) No. 22 Auburn; Semifinals	L 62–65	19–15	16 – Tied	12 – Hayes	5 – Nembhard	Bridgestone Arena (20,933); Nashville, TN
NCAA tournament
March 21, 2019*; 6:50 pm, TNT	(10 W)	vs. (7 W) No. 20 Nevada; First Round	W 70–61	20–15	16 – Hayes	10 – Johnson	6 – Nembhard	Wells Fargo Arena (16,360); Des Moines, IA
March 23, 2019*; 5:15 pm, CBS	(10 W)	vs. (2 W) No. 8 Michigan; Second Round	L 49–64	20–16	11 – Hudson	9 – Johnson	8 – Nembhard	Wells Fargo Arena (16,770); Des Moines, IA
*Non-conference game. ^{#}Rankings from AP Poll. (#) Tournament seedings in parentheses. W=West. All times are in Eastern Time.

== Rankings ==
Ranking movements Legend: ██ Increase in ranking ██ Decrease in ranking — = Not ranked RV = Received votes
	Week																			
Poll	Pre	1	2	3	4	5	6	7	8	9	10	11	12	13	14	15	16	17	18	Final
AP	RV	RV	RV	RV	RV	RV	RV	—	RV	RV	RV	RV	—	—	—	—	—	—	—	Not released
Coaches	RV	RV	RV	—	RV	RV	RV	—	RV	—	—	—	—	—	—	RV	RV	—	RV	RV

*AP does not release post-NCAA Tournament rankings
