= 2018–19 Texas A&M Aggies men's basketball team =

American college basketball season

2018–19 Texas A&M Aggies men's basketball
- Conference: Southeastern Conference
- Record: 14–18 (6–12 SEC)
- Head coach: Billy Kennedy (8th season)
- Assistant coaches: Isaac Chew; Ulric Maligi (3rd season); Jeff Reynolds
- Home arena: Reed Arena

2018–19 Southeastern Conference men's basketball standings
	Conf.				Overall
Team	W		L	PCT	W		L	PCT
No. 15 LSU	16	–	2	.889	28	–	7	.800
No. 10 Tennessee	15	–	3	.833	31	–	6	.838
No. 7 Kentucky	15	–	3	.833	30	–	7	.811
No. 5 Auburn†	11	–	7	.611	30	–	10	.750
South Carolina	11	–	7	.611	16	–	16	.500
Mississippi State	10	–	8	.556	23	–	11	.676
Ole Miss	10	–	8	.556	20	–	13	.606
Florida	9	–	9	.500	20	–	16	.556
Alabama	8	–	10	.444	18	–	16	.529
Arkansas	8	–	10	.444	18	–	16	.529
Texas A&M	6	–	12	.333	14	–	18	.438
Missouri	5	–	13	.278	15	–	17	.469
Georgia	2	–	16	.111	11	–	21	.344
Vanderbilt	0	–	18	.000	9	–	23	.281
† 2019 SEC tournament winner Rankings from AP Poll

The 2018–19 Texas A&M Aggies men's basketball team represented Texas A&M University in the 2018–19 NCAA Division I men's basketball season. The team's head coach Billy Kennedy was in his eighth and final season at Texas A&M. The Aggies played their home games at Reed Arena in College Station, Texas in their seventh season as members of the Southeastern Conference. They finished the season 14–18, 6–12 in SEC play to finish in 11th place. They defeated Vanderbilt in the first round of the SEC tournament before losing to Mississippi State.

On March 15, 2019, the school fired head coach Billy Kennedy after eight seasons. On April 3, the school hired Virginia Tech head coach Buzz Williams as the team's next head coach.

== Previous season ==
The Aggies finished the 2017–18 season 22–13, 9–9 in SEC play to finish in a tie for seventh place. They lost in the second round of the SEC tournament to Alabama. They received an at-large bid to the NCAA tournament, where they defeated Providence and North Carolina to advance to the Sweet Sixteen, where they lost to Michigan.

== Offseason ==
=== Departures ===
Name	Number	Pos.	Height	Weight	Year	Hometown	Reason for departure
D. J. Hogg	1	F	6'9"	215	Junior	Plano, TX	Declared for 2018 NBA draft
J. J. Caldwell	4	G	6'1"	195	RS freshman	Houston, TX	Dismissed from team
Tonny Trocha-Morelos	10	C	6'10"	229	RS senior	Cartagena, Colombia	Graduated
Duane Wilson	13	G	6'2"	175	RS senior	Milwaukee, WI	Graduated
Tyler Davis	34	C	6'10"	266	Junior	Plano, TX	Declared for 2018 NBA draft
Robert Williams III	44	C	6'10"	241	Sophomore	Vivian, LA	Declared for 2018 NBA draft

=== Incoming transfers ===
Name	Number	Pos.	Height	Weight	Year	Hometown	Previous school
Wendell Mitchell	11	G	6'3"	185	RS junior	Rockdale, TX	Trinity Valley CC
Brandon Mahan	13	G	6'5"	200	Sophomore	Birmingham, AL	Chipola College.
John Brown	20	F	7'0"	220	RS sophomore	Magnolia, TX	Blinn College
Christian Mekowulu	21	F	6'9"	245	RS senior	Lagos, Nigeria	Tennessee State

=== 2018 recruiting class ===
There was no recruiting class of 2018.

== Roster ==
2018–19 Texas A&M Aggies men's basketball team
Players
Coaches

Pos.	#	Name	Height	Weight	Year	Previous school	Hometown
G	0	Jay Jay Chandler	6 ft 4 in (1.93 m)	180 lb (82 kg)	So	Cinco Ranch	Katy, Texas
G/F	1	Savion Flagg	6 ft 7 in (2.01 m)	217 lb (98 kg)	So	Alvin	Alvin, Texas
G	2	TJ Starks	6 ft 2 in (1.88 m)	196 lb (89 kg)	So	Lancaster	Lancaster, Texas
G	3	Admon Gilder (redshirt)	6 ft 4 in (1.93 m)	199 lb (90 kg)	Sr	James Madison	Dallas, Texas
G	4	Mark French (W)	5 ft 8 in (1.73 m)	160 lb (73 kg)	Jr	Prestonwood Christian	Plano, Texas
C	10	Everett Vaughn (W)	6 ft 10 in (2.08 m)	237 lb (108 kg)	Fr	St. Thomas	Bellaire, Texas
G	11	Wendell Mitchell	6 ft 3 in (1.91 m)	180 lb (82 kg)	RS Jr	Rockdale; Baylor/Trinity Valley CC	Rockdale, Texas
G	12	Chris Collins (W)	6 ft 2 in (1.88 m)	181 lb (82 kg)	RS Sr	Friendswood	Friendswood, Texas
G	13	Brandon Mahan	6 ft 5 in (1.96 m)	200 lb (91 kg)	So	Central Park Christian; Chipola College	Birmingham, Alabama
F	15	Isiah Jasey	6 ft 10 in (2.08 m)	246 lb (112 kg)	So	Sunrise Christian	Killeen, Texas
F	20	John Brown (W)	6 ft 10 in (2.08 m)	220 lb (100 kg)	RS So	Magnolia; Texas Tech/Blinn College	Magnolia, Texas
F	21	Christian Mekowulu	6 ft 9 in (2.06 m)	245 lb (111 kg)	RS Sr	Covenant Christian; Tennessee State	Lagos, Nigeria
G	22	Frank Byers	5 ft 10 in (1.78 m)	180 lb (82 kg)	Sr	South Oak Cliff	Dallas, Texas
F	24	John Walker III	6 ft 9 in (2.06 m)	196 lb (89 kg)	RS Fr	Fort Bend Marshall	Missouri City, Texas
F	31	Luke McGhee (W)	6 ft 8 in (2.03 m)	237 lb (108 kg)	Fr	Clark	San Antonio, Texas
F	32	Josh Nebo	6 ft 9 in (2.06 m)	244 lb (111 kg)	RS Jr	Cypress Lakes; Saint Francis	Houston, Texas
G	33	Cameron Alo (W)	5 ft 9 in (1.75 m)	174 lb (79 kg)	So	St. Thomas	Houston, Texas

Head coach

- Billy Kennedy (Southeastern Louisiana)

Assistant coach(es)

- Issac Chew (Avila)
- Ulric Maligi (Howard)
- Jeff Reynolds (UNC Greensboro)

Legend

- (C) Team captain
- (S) Suspended
- (I) Ineligible
- (W) Walk-on
- Injured
- Current redshirt

Roster

== Schedule and results ==
Date time, TV	Rank^{#}	Opponent^{#}	Result	Record	High points	High rebounds	High assists	Site (attendance) city, state
Regular season
November 7, 2018*; 8:30 pm, SECN+		Savannah State	W 98–83	1–0	24 – Flagg	16 – Flagg	6 – Collins	Reed Arena (6,757); College Station, TX
November 9, 2018*; 8:30 pm, SECN+		UC Irvine	L 73–74	1–1	15 – Nebo	10 – Nebo	3 – Tied	Reed Arena (7,689); College Station, TX
November 15, 2018*; 10:30 pm, ESPN2		at No. 3 Gonzaga	L 74–91	1–2	18 – Flagg	10 – Mekowulu	4 – Starks	McCarthey Athletic Center (6,000); Spokane, WA
November 18, 2018*; 9:30 pm, ESPN2		vs. Minnesota; Vancouver Showcase	L 64–69	1–3	17 – Mahan	9 – Flagg	5 – Starks	Vancouver Convention Centre (3,107); Vancouver, BC
November 20, 2018*; 10:30 pm, ESPN2		vs. Washington; Vancouver Showcase	L 67–71	1–4	21 – Chandler	8 – Chandler	5 – Starks	Vancouver Convention Centre; Vancouver, BC
November 23, 2018*; 6:30 pm, SECN+		South Alabama	W 74–62	2–4	25 – Flagg	8 – Mekowulu	5 – Chandler	Reed Arena (8,569); College Station, TX
December 3, 2018*; 7:00 pm, SECN		Northwestern State	W 80-59	3-4	18 – Mitchell	9 – Nebo	6 – Flagg	Reed Arena (4,805); College Station, TX
December 8, 2018*; 5:00 pm, SECN		Boston College	Cancelled					Reed Arena; College Station, TX
December 15, 2018*; 10:00 pm, P12N		vs. Oregon State; Dam City Classic	W 67-64	4-4	18 – Starks	8 – Flagg	8 – Starks	Moda Center (5,802); Portland, OR
December 19, 2018*; 7:30 pm, SECN+		Valparaiso	W 71–49	5–4	20 – Tied	9 – Mitchell	5 – Mitchell	Reed Arena (6,684); College Station, TX
December 22, 2018*; 1:00 pm, SECN+		Marshall	W 92–68	6–4	17 – Tied	12 – Flagg	4 – Tied	Reed Arena (7,894); College Station, TX
December 29, 2018*; 2:30 pm, SECN+		Texas Southern	L 73–88	6–5	21 – Mitchell	9 – Flagg	6 – Flagg	Reed Arena (7,925); College Station, TX
January 5, 2019; 5:00 pm, SECN		Arkansas	L 71–73	6–6 (0–1)	23 – Starks	15 – Flagg	5 – Starks	Reed Arena (10,049); College Station, TX
January 8, 2019; 6:00 pm, SECN		at No. 18 Kentucky	L 74–85	6–7 (0–2)	18 – Tied	9 – Flagg	5 – Mitchell	Rupp Arena; Lexington, KY
January 12, 2019; 2:30 pm, SECN		at Alabama	W 81–80	7–7 (1–2)	21 – Nebo	7 – Tied	2 – Tied	Coleman Coliseum; Tuscaloosa, AL
January 16, 2019; 6:00 pm, ESPNU		No. 14 Auburn	L 66–85	7–8 (1–3)	22 – Tied	7 – Tied	2 – Tied	Reed Arena (8,730); College Station, TX
January 19, 2019; 2:30 pm, SECN		Missouri	L 43–66	7–9 (1–4)	12 – Nebo	7 – Flagg	3 – French	Reed Arena (6,396); College Station, TX
January 22, 2019; 7:30 pm, SECN		at Florida	L 72–81	7–10 (1–5)	25 – Mitchell	9 – Nebo	6 – Starks	Exactech Arena (9,063); Gainesville, FL
January 26, 2019*; 1:00 pm, ESPN		Kansas State; Big 12/SEC Challenge	W 65–53	8–10	22 – Mitchell	12 – Flagg	6 – Starks	Reed Arena (7,100); College Station, TX
January 30, 2019; 8:00 pm, ESPN2		No. 19 LSU	L 57–72	8–11 (1–6)	21 – Starks	11 – Nebo	3 – Starks	Reed Arena (6,554); College Station, TX
February 2, 2019; 7:00 pm, ESPN		No. 1 Tennessee	L 76–93	8–12 (1–7)	18 – Mitchell	6 – Tied	8 – Starks	Reed Arena (10,234); College Station, TX
February 6, 2019; 6:00 pm, SECN		at Ole Miss	L 71–75	8–13 (1–8)	23 – Mitchell	10 – Nebo	4 – Tied	The Pavilion at Ole Miss (7,718); Oxford, MS
February 9, 2019; 5:00 pm, SECN		at Missouri	W 68-59	9-13 (2-8)	20 – Mitchell	10 – Mekowulo	3 – Starks	Mizzou Arena (11,171); Columbia, MO
February 12, 2019; 6:00 pm, SECN		Georgia	W 73–56	10–13 (3–8)	19 – Starks	15 – Mekowulu	4 – Flagg	Reed Arena (5,782); College Station, TX
February 16, 2019; 12:00 pm, SECN		at South Carolina	L 77–84	10–14 (3–9)	24 – Flagg	7 – Flagg	4 – Mitchell	Colonial Life Arena (13,473); Columbia, SC
February 19, 2019; 8:00 pm, SECN		Alabama	W 65–56	11–14 (4–9)	18 – Tied	9 – Flagg	3 – Tied	Reed Arena (5,459); College Station, TX
February 23, 2019; 7:30 pm, SECN		at Arkansas	W 87–80	12–14 (5–9)	22 – Flagg	9 – Flagg	4 – Flagg	Bud Walton Arena (16,108); Fayetteville, AR
February 26, 2019; 8:00 pm, ESPN2		at No. 13 LSU	L 55–66	12–15 (5–10)	14 – Mitchell	8 – Mahan	2 – Tied	Pete Maravich Assembly Center (9,614); Baton Rouge, LA
March 2, 2019; 5:00 pm, SECN		Vanderbilt	W 64-57	13-15 (6-10)	22 – Flagg	12 – Tied	3 – Tied	Reed Arena (7,679); College Station, TX
March 5, 2019; 6:00 pm, SECN		South Carolina	L 54–71	13–16 (6–11)	15 – Mitchell	11 – Flagg	4 – Mitchell	Reed Arena (5,032); College Station, TX
March 9, 2019; 1:00 pm, ESPN2		at Mississippi State	L 81–92	13–17 (6–12)	23 – Flagg	15 – Mekowulu	3 – Flagg	Humphrey Coliseum (8,732); Starkville, MS
SEC tournament
March 13, 2019; 8:00 pm, SECN	(11)	vs. (14) Vanderbilt; First Round	W 69–52	14–17	29 – Flagg	9 – Mekowulu	3 – Mitchell	Bridgestone Arena (10,849); Nashville, TN
March 14, 2019; 8:00 pm, SECN	(11)	vs. (6) Mississippi State; Second Round	L 54–80	14–18	21 – Flagg	10 – Flagg	2 – Tied	Bridgestone Arena; Nashville, TN
*Non-conference game. ^{#}Rankings from AP Poll. (#) Tournament seedings in parentheses. All times are in Central Time.
