= 2018–19 LSU Tigers basketball team =

American college basketball season

2018–19 LSU Tigers basketball

SEC regular season champions

NCAA tournament, Sweet Sixteen
- Conference: Southeastern Conference

Ranking
- Coaches: No. 15
- AP: No. 12
- Record: 28–7 (16–2 SEC)
- Head coach: Will Wade (2nd season); Tony Benford (interim)
- Assistant coaches: Bill Armstrong; Tony Benford; Greg Heiar
- Home arena: Pete Maravich Assembly Center

2018–19 Southeastern Conference men's basketball standings
	Conf.				Overall
Team	W		L	PCT	W		L	PCT
No. 15 LSU	16	–	2	.889	28	–	7	.800
No. 10 Tennessee	15	–	3	.833	31	–	6	.838
No. 7 Kentucky	15	–	3	.833	30	–	7	.811
No. 5 Auburn†	11	–	7	.611	30	–	10	.750
South Carolina	11	–	7	.611	16	–	16	.500
Mississippi State	10	–	8	.556	23	–	11	.676
Ole Miss	10	–	8	.556	20	–	13	.606
Florida	9	–	9	.500	20	–	16	.556
Alabama	8	–	10	.444	18	–	16	.529
Arkansas	8	–	10	.444	18	–	16	.529
Texas A&M	6	–	12	.333	14	–	18	.438
Missouri	5	–	13	.278	15	–	17	.469
Georgia	2	–	16	.111	11	–	21	.344
Vanderbilt	0	–	18	.000	9	–	23	.281
† 2019 SEC tournament winner Rankings from AP Poll

The 2018–19 LSU Tigers basketball team represented Louisiana State University during the 2018–19 NCAA Division I men's basketball season. The team's head coach was Will Wade, in his second season at LSU. Tony Benford also served as interim head coach for the last regular season game, 2019 SEC men's basketball tournament and 2019 NCAA Division I men's basketball tournament. They played their home games at the Pete Maravich Assembly Center in Baton Rouge, Louisiana, as a member of the Southeastern Conference. They finished the season 28–7, 16–2 in SEC Play to finish as SEC regular season champions.. They lost in the quarterfinals of the SEC tournament to Florida. They received an at-large bid to the NCAA tournament where they defeated Yale and Maryland to advance to the Sweet Sixteen where they lost to Michigan State.

== Previous season ==
The Tigers finished the 2017–18 season 18–15, 8–10 in SEC play to finish in a tie for ninth place. They lost in the second round of the SEC tournament to Mississippi State. The Tigers received an invitation to the National Invitation Tournament where they defeated Louisiana before losing in to Utah in the second round.

== Offseason ==
=== Departures ===
Name	Number	Pos.	Height	Weight	Year	Hometown	Reason for departure
Brandon Sampson	0	G	6'5"	184	Junior	Baton Rouge, LA	Declared for the 2018 NBA draft
Duop Reath	1	F	6'11"	244	Senior	Perth, Australia	Graduated
Brandon Rachal	2	G	6'5"	215	Freshman	Natchitoches, LA	Transferred to Pearl River CC
Galen Alexander	10	F	6'6"	210	Freshman	Breaux Bridge, LA	Dismissed from the team
Jeremy Combs	13	F	6'7"	215	Senior	Dallas, TX	Graduated
Randy Onwausor	14	G	6'3"	210	RS Senior	Inglewood, CA	Graduated
Reed Vial	15	G	6'3"	190	Junior	Baton Rouge, LA	Walk-on; left the team for personal reasons
Aaron Epps	21	F	6'10"	214	Senior	Ball, LA	Graduated
Mayan Kiir	35	F	6'9"	217	Sophomore	Bradenton, FL	Dismissed from the team
Wayde Sims	44	F	6'6"	217	Sophomore	Baton Rouge, LA	Deceased

=== Incoming transfers ===
Name	Number	Pos.	Height	Weight	Year	Hometown	Previous School
Marlon Taylor	14	F	6'6"		Junior	Mount Vernon, NY	Panola College
Danya Kingsby	20	G	6'1"	165	Junior	Milwaukee, WI	College of Southern Idaho
Courtese Cooper	21	F	6'9"	205	Sophomore	Elgin, IL	Triton College

=== 2018 recruiting class ===
College recruiting information
Name	Hometown	School	Height	Weight	Commit date
Naz Reid #3 PF	Asbury Park, NJ	Roselle Catholic High School	6 ft 10 in (2.08 m)	240 lb (110 kg)	Sep 12, 2017
Naz Reid #3 PF	Recruit ratings: Scout: Rivals: 247Sports: ESPN:				
Emmitt Williams #7 PF	Lehigh Acres, FL	Oak Ridge High School	6 ft 6 in (1.98 m)	215 lb (98 kg)	Jan 26, 2018
Emmitt Williams #7 PF	Recruit ratings: Scout: Rivals: 247Sports: ESPN:				
Javonte Smart #9 PG	Baton Rouge, LA	Scotlandville Magnet High School	6 ft 4 in (1.93 m)	190 lb (86 kg)	Jun 30, 2017
Javonte Smart #9 PG	Recruit ratings: Scout: Rivals: 247Sports: ESPN:				
Darius Days #14 PF	Williston, FL	The Rock School	6 ft 7 in (2.01 m)	218 lb (99 kg)	Oct 20, 2017
Darius Days #14 PF	Recruit ratings: Scout: Rivals: 247Sports: ESPN:				
Aundre Hyatt #51 PF	Chalottesville, VA	The Miller School	6 ft 7 in (2.01 m)	218 lb (99 kg)	Aug 6, 2018
Aundre Hyatt #51 PF	Recruit ratings: Scout: Rivals: 247Sports: ESPN:				
Overall recruit ranking:
Note: In many cases, Scout, Rivals, 247Sports, On3, and ESPN may conflict in their listings of height and weight.; In these cases, the average was taken. ESPN grades are on a 100-point scale.; Sources: "LSU 2018 Basketball Commitments". Rivals.; "2018 LSU Basketball Commits". Scout.; "ESPN". ESPN.; "Scout.com Team Recruiting Rankings". Scout.; "2018 Team Ranking". Rivals.

== Roster ==
2018–19 LSU Tigers men's basketball team
Players
Coaches

Pos.	#	Name	Height	Weight	Year	Previous school	Hometown
F	0	Naz Reid	6 ft 10 in (2.08 m)	240 lb (109 kg)	Fr	Roselle Catholic High School	Asbury Park, New Jersey
G	1	Javonte Smart	6 ft 4 in (1.93 m)	190 lb (86 kg)	Fr	Scotlandville Magnet High School	Baton Rouge, Louisiana
G	3	Tremont Waters	5 ft 11 in (1.8 m)	167 lb (76 kg)	So	Notre Dame High School	New Haven, Connecticut
G	4	Skylar Mays	6 ft 4 in (1.93 m)	200 lb (91 kg)	Jr	Findlay Prep	Baton Rouge, Louisiana
G	5	Daryl Edwards	6 ft 3 in (1.91 m)	165 lb (75 kg)	Jr	Northwest Florida State	Fresno, California
G	10	Noah Thomas (W)	6 ft 4 in (1.93 m)	185 lb (84 kg)	Fr	Cy-Fair High School	Cypress, Texas
F	11	Kavell Bigby-Williams	6 ft 11 in (2.11 m)	230 lb (104 kg)	RS Sr	Oregon	London, England
G	12	Marshall Graves (W)	6 ft 4 in (1.93 m)	195 lb (88 kg)	Jr	Louisiana State University Laboratory School	Ponchatoula, Louisiana
G	13	Will Reese (W)	6 ft 4 in (1.93 m)	190 lb (86 kg)	RS So	Anacoco High School	Leesville, Louisiana
G	14	Marlon Taylor	6 ft 6 in (1.98 m)	210 lb (95 kg)	Jr	Panola College	Mount Vernon, New York
F	15	Aundre Hyatt	6 ft 7 in (2.01 m)	215 lb (98 kg)	Fr	Miller School	Bronx, New York
G	20	Danya Kingsby	6 ft 1 in (1.85 m)	165 lb (75 kg)	Jr	Southern Idaho	Milwaukee, Wisconsin
F	21	Courtese Cooper	6 ft 9 in (2.06 m)	205 lb (93 kg)	So	Triton College	Elgin, Illinois
F	22	Darius Days	6 ft 7 in (2.01 m)	218 lb (99 kg)	Fr	IMG Academy	Raleigh, Florida
F	24	Emmitt Williams	6 ft 7 in (2.01 m)	215 lb (98 kg)	Fr	Oak Ridge High School	Fort Myers, Florida

Head coach

- Will Wade (Clemson)

Assistant coach(es)

- Bill Armstrong (UAB)
- Tony Benford (Texas Tech)
- Greg Heiar (Franciscan)

Legend

- (C) Team captain
- (S) Suspended
- (I) Ineligible
- (W) Walk-on
- Injured
- Current redshirt

Roster

== Schedule and results ==
Date time, TV	Rank^{#}	Opponent^{#}	Result	Record	High points	High rebounds	High assists	Site (attendance) city, state
Non-conference regular season
November 6, 2018*; 7:30 pm, SECN+	No. 23	Southeastern Louisiana	W 93–64	1–0	17 – Reid	10 – Williams	2 – Tied	Pete Maravich Assembly Center (10,513); Baton Rouge, LA
November 9, 2018*; 7:00 pm, SECN+	No. 23	UNC Greensboro	W 97–91	2–0	29 – Reid	7 – Reid	10 – Waters	Pete Maravich Assembly Center (8,613); Baton Rouge, LA
November 13, 2018*; 6:00 pm, SECN	No. 22	Memphis; AdvoCare Invitational non-bracket game	W 85–76	3–0	19 – Mays	10 – Williams	8 – Waters	Pete Maravich Assembly Center (9,295); Baton Rouge, LA
November 16, 2018*; 7:00 pm, SECN+	No. 22	Louisiana Tech	W 74–67	4–0	16 – Smart	7 – Williams	5 – Waters	Pete Maravich Assembly Center (9,557); Baton Rouge, LA
November 22, 2018*; 6:00 pm, ESPNU	No. 19	vs. College of Charleston; AdvoCare Invitational quarterfinals	W 67–55	5–0	14 – Williams	9 – Williams	11 – Waters	HP Field House (N/A); Orlando, FL
November 23, 2018*; 4:30 pm, ESPN2	No. 19	vs. No. 14 Florida State; AdvoCare Invitational semifinals	L 76–79 ^{OT}	5–1	19 – Mays	6 – Days	8 – Smart	HP Field House (N/A); Orlando, FL
November 25, 2018*; 3:00 pm, ESPN2	No. 19	vs. Oklahoma State; AdvoCare Invitational 3rd place game	L 77–90	5–2	20 – Mays	7 – Bigby-Williams	5 – Waters	HP Field House (N/A); Orlando, FL
December 1, 2018*; 4:00 pm, SECN+		Grambling State	W 78–57	6–2	15 – Waters	9 – Days	5 – Tied	Pete Maravich Assembly Center (8,474); Baton Rouge, LA
December 9, 2018*; 1:00 pm, SECN		Incarnate Word	W 91–50	7–2	16 – Tied	10 – Bigby-Williams	6 – Mays	Pete Maravich Assembly Center (9,098); Baton Rouge, LA
December 12, 2018*; 8:00 pm, ESPN2		at No. 24 Houston	L 76–82	7–3	18 – Smart	6 – Williams	2 – Tied	Fertitta Center (7,039); Houston, TX
December 15, 2018*; 10:00 pm, ESPNU		vs. Saint Mary's; Neon Hoops Showcase	W 78–74	8–3	18 – Waters	6 – Williams	3 – Tied	T-Mobile Arena (5,107); Paradise, NV
December 21, 2018*; 7:00 pm, SECN+		No. 24 Furman	W 75–57	9–3	20 – Waters	10 – Tied	7 – Waters	Pete Maravich Assembly Center (9,765); Baton Rouge, LA
December 28, 2018*; 7:00 pm, SECN+		Louisiana–Monroe	W 81–69	10–3	19 – Reid	12 – Reid	10 – Waters	Pete Maravich Assembly Center (10,028); Baton Rouge, LA
SEC regular season
January 8, 2019; 8:00 pm, SECN		Alabama	W 88–79	11–3 (1–0)	19 – Waters	13 – Bigby-Williams	7 – Waters	Pete Maravich Assembly Center (9,718); Baton Rouge, LA
January 12, 2019; 5:00 pm, SECN		at Arkansas	W 94–88 ^{OT}	12–3 (2–0)	27 – Reid	10 – Williams	11 – Waters	Bud Walton Arena (17,361); Fayetteville, AR
January 15, 2019; 8:00 pm, SECN		at No. 18 Ole Miss	W 83–69	13–3 (3–0)	20 – Waters	10 – Bigby-Williams	9 – Waters	The Pavilion at Ole Miss (9,500); Oxford, MS
January 19, 2019; 5:00 pm, SECN		South Carolina	W 89–67	14–3 (4–0)	15 – Tied	13 – Williams	6 – Waters	Pete Maravich Assembly Center (11,607); Baton Rouge, LA
January 23, 2019; 6:00 pm, SECN	No. 25	Georgia	W 92–82	15–3 (5–0)	26 – Waters	7 – Reid	4 – Waters	Pete Maravich Assembly Center (9,416); Baton Rouge, LA
January 26, 2019; 5:00 pm, SECN	No. 25	at Missouri	W 86–80 ^{OT}	16–3 (6–0)	24 – Mays	8 – Reid	9 – Waters	Mizzou Arena (11,513); Columbia, MO
January 30, 2019; 8:00 pm, ESPN2	No. 19	at Texas A&M	W 72–57	17–3 (7–0)	36 – Waters	11 – Bigby-Williams	4 – Mays	Reed Arena (6,554); College Station, TX
February 2, 2019; 5:00 pm, SECN	No. 19	Arkansas	L 89–90	17–4 (7–1)	19 – Reid	10 – Reid	6 – Waters	Pete Maravich Assembly Center (13,311); Baton Rouge, LA
February 6, 2019; 8:00 pm, ESPN2	No. 21	at Mississippi State	W 92–88 ^{OT}	18–4 (8–1)	29 – Reid	13 – Bigby-Williams	5 – Waters	Humphrey Coliseum (7,456); Starkville, MS
February 9, 2019; 1:00 pm, ESPN2	No. 21	Auburn	W 83–78	19–4 (9–1)	20 – Mays	11 – Bigby-Williams	10 – Waters	Pete Maravich Assembly Center (12,004); Baton Rouge, LA
February 12, 2019; 6:00 pm, ESPN	No. 19	at No. 5 Kentucky	W 73–71	20–4 (10–1)	15 – Waters	7 – Reid	5 – Tied	Rupp Arena (23,490); Lexington, KY
February 16, 2019; 5:00 pm, SECN	No. 19	at Georgia	W 83–79	21–4 (11–1)	20 – Waters	8 – Bigby-Williams	5 – Waters	Stegeman Coliseum (10,298); Athens, GA
February 20, 2019; 6:00 pm, ESPN2	No. 13	Florida	L 77–82 ^{OT}	21–5 (11–2)	18 – Mays	15 – Reid	4 – Waters	Pete Maravich Assembly Center (10,976); Baton Rouge, LA
February 23, 2019; 11:00 am, ESPN	No. 13	No. 5 Tennessee	W 82–80 ^{OT}	22–5 (12–2)	29 – Smart	10 – Bigby-Williams	5 – Smart	Pete Maravich Assembly Center (13,581); Baton Rouge, LA
February 26, 2019; 8:00 pm, ESPN2	No. 13	Texas A&M	W 66–55	23–5 (13–2)	18 – Reid	11 – Tied	5 – Mays	Pete Maravich Assembly Center (9,614); Baton Rouge, LA
March 2, 2019; 11:00 am, ESPN	No. 13	at Alabama	W 74–69	24–5 (14–2)	20 – Mays	13 – Reid	4 – Smart	Coleman Coliseum (11,570); Tuscaloosa, AL
March 6, 2019; 6:00 pm, ESPN2	No. 10	at Florida	W 79–78 ^{OT}	25–5 (15–2)	19 – Waters	14 – Williams	6 – Waters	Exactech Arena (9,550); Gainesville, FL
March 9, 2019; 7:30 pm, SECN	No. 10	Vanderbilt	W 80–59	26–5 (16–2)	15 – Days	11 – Bigby-Williams	8 – Waters	Pete Maravich Assembly Center (13,546); Baton Rouge, LA
SEC Tournament
March 15, 2019; 12:00 pm, ESPN	(1) No. 9	vs. (8) Florida; Quarterfinals	L 73–76	26–6	26 – Reid	14 – Reid	7 – Waters	Bridgestone Arena (16,490); Nashville, TN
NCAA tournament
March 21, 2019*; 11:40 am, truTV	(3 E) No. 12	vs. (14 E) Yale; First Round	W 79–74	27–6	19 – Mays	10 – Reid	7 – Waters	VyStar Veterans Memorial Arena (12,429); Jacksonville, FL
March 24, 2019*; 11:10 am, CBS	(3 E) No. 12	vs. (6 E) Maryland; Second Round	W 69–67	28–6	16 – Mays	8 – Bigby-Williams	5 – Waters	VyStar Veterans Memorial Arena (14,250); Jacksonville, FL
March 29, 2019*; 6:09 pm, CBS	(3 E) No. 12	vs. (2 E) No. 5 Michigan State; Sweet Sixteen	L 63–80	28–7	23 – Waters	9 – Reid	9 – Tied	Capital One Arena (20,728); Washington, D.C.
*Non-conference game. ^{#}Rankings from AP Poll. (#) Tournament seedings in parentheses. E=East. All times are in Central Time.

== Rankings ==
Ranking movements Legend: ██ Increase in ranking ██ Decrease in ranking — = Not ranked RV = Received votes
	Week																				
Poll	Pre	1	2	3	4	5	6	7	8	9	10	11	12	13	14	15	16	17	18	19	Final
AP	23	22	19	RV	—	—	—	—	—	—	RV	25	19	21	19	13	13	10	9	12	Not released
Coaches	RV	RV^	21	RV	RV	—	—	—	—	—	—	RV	19	22	21	15	14	10	9	12	15

*AP does not release post-NCAA Tournament rankings
^Coaches did not release a Week 2 poll.
