= 2018–19 Mississippi State Bulldogs men's basketball team =

American college basketball season

2018–19 Mississippi State Bulldogs men's basketball

NCAA tournament, First Round
- Conference: Southeastern Conference
- Record: 23–11 (10–8 SEC)
- Head coach: Ben Howland (4th season)
- Assistant coaches: George Brooks; Korey McCray; Ernie Zeigler
- Home arena: Humphrey Coliseum

2018–19 Southeastern Conference men's basketball standings
	Conf.				Overall
Team	W		L	PCT	W		L	PCT
No. 15 LSU	16	–	2	.889	28	–	7	.800
No. 10 Tennessee	15	–	3	.833	31	–	6	.838
No. 7 Kentucky	15	–	3	.833	30	–	7	.811
No. 5 Auburn†	11	–	7	.611	30	–	10	.750
South Carolina	11	–	7	.611	16	–	16	.500
Mississippi State	10	–	8	.556	23	–	11	.676
Ole Miss	10	–	8	.556	20	–	13	.606
Florida	9	–	9	.500	20	–	16	.556
Alabama	8	–	10	.444	18	–	16	.529
Arkansas	8	–	10	.444	18	–	16	.529
Texas A&M	6	–	12	.333	14	–	18	.438
Missouri	5	–	13	.278	15	–	17	.469
Georgia	2	–	16	.111	11	–	21	.344
Vanderbilt	0	–	18	.000	9	–	23	.281
† 2019 SEC tournament winner Rankings from AP Poll

The 2018–19 Mississippi State Bulldogs basketball team represented Mississippi State University in the 2018–19 NCAA Division I men's basketball season. The Bulldogs, led by fourth-year head coach Ben Howland, played their home games at the Humphrey Coliseum in Starkville, Mississippi as members of the Southeastern Conference. They finished the season 23-11, to finish a tie for 6th place. In the SEC Tournament, They defeated Texas A&M in the second round before losing to Tennessee in the quarterfinals. They received a at-large bid to the NCAA Tournament where they were upset by 12th seed Liberty in the first round.

== Previous season ==
The Bulldogs finished the 2017–18 season 25–12, 9–9 in SEC play to finish in a tie for seventh place. They defeated LSU in the second round of the SEC tournament before losing in the quarterfinals to Tennessee. They were received an at-large bid to the National Invitation Tournament where they defeated Nebraska, Baylor, and Louisville to advance to the semifinals where they lost to Penn State.

== Offseason ==
=== Departures ===
Name	Number	Pos.	Height	Weight	Year	Hometown	Reason for departure
Xavian Stapleton	3	G	6'6"	210	RS Junior	Flora, MS	Transferred to Florida Atlantic
Drew Davis	12	G	5'10"	165	Senior	Atlanta, GA	Graduated
Nick Singleton	13	G	6'5"	195	Junior	Decatur, GA	Left team
Eli Wright	32	G	6'4"	190	Sophomore	Owesnboro, KY	Transferred to St. John's
Schnider Herard	34	C	6'10"	260	Sophomore	Plano, TX	Transferred to Maryland

=== Incoming transfers ===
Name	Number	Pos.	Height	Weight	Year	Hometown	Previous School
Prince Oduro	15	F	6'8"	253	Sophomore	Toronto, ON	Siena
Jethro Tshisumpa	42	F	6'10"	260	Junior	Lubumbashi, Congo	San Jacinto College

=== 2018 recruiting class ===
College recruiting information
Name	Hometown	School	Height	Weight	Commit date
Reggie Perry #8 PF	Thomasville, Georgia	Thomasville High School	6 ft 8 in (2.03 m)	239 lb (108 kg)	Jul 17, 2017
Reggie Perry #8 PF	Recruit ratings: Scout: Rivals: 247Sports: ESPN:				
Robert Woodard II #10 SF	Columbus, Mississippi	Columbus High School	6 ft 6 in (1.98 m)	222 lb (101 kg)	Nov 14, 2017
Robert Woodard II #10 SF	Recruit ratings: Scout: Rivals: 247Sports: ESPN:				
D. J. Stewart Jr. SF	Grace, Mississippi	Riverside High School	6 ft 6 in (1.98 m)	190 lb (86 kg)	Jul 24, 2017
D. J. Stewart Jr. SF	Recruit ratings: Scout: Rivals: 247Sports: ESPN:				
Overall recruit ranking:
Note: In many cases, Scout, Rivals, 247Sports, On3, and ESPN may conflict in their listings of height and weight.; In these cases, the average was taken. ESPN grades are on a 100-point scale.; Sources: "Mississippi State 2018 Basketball Commitments". Rivals.; "2018 Mississippi State Basketball Commits". Scout.; "ESPN". ESPN.; "Scout.com Team Recruiting Rankings". Scout.; "2018 Team Ranking". Rivals.

== Roster ==
2018–19 Mississippi State Bulldogs men's basketball team
Players
Coaches

Pos.	#	Name	Height	Weight	Year	Previous school	Hometown
G	0	Nick Weatherspoon	6 ft 2 in (1.88 m)	195 lb (88 kg)	So	Velma Jackson HS	Camden, MS
F	1	Reggie Perry	6 ft 10 in (2.08 m)	245 lb (111 kg)	Fr	Thomasville HS	Thomasville, GA
G	2	Lamar Peters	6 ft 0 in (1.83 m)	185 lb (84 kg)	Jr	Landry-Walker HS	New Orleans, LA
G	3	D. J. Stewart Jr. (redshirt)	6 ft 6 in (1.98 m)	195 lb (88 kg)	Fr	Riverside HS	Grace, MS
G	4	T. J. Gray (W)	6 ft 0 in (1.83 m)	165 lb (75 kg)	Jr	Columbus HS	Columbus, MS
F	5	Mitchell Storm (W)	6 ft 7 in (2.01 m)	202 lb (92 kg)	Jr	Madison Central HS; East Mississippi CC	Madison, MS
G	10	Tate Clayton (W)	6 ft 2 in (1.88 m)	170 lb (77 kg)	So	Tupelo HS	Tupelo, MS
G	11	Quinndary Weatherspoon	6 ft 4 in (1.93 m)	205 lb (93 kg)	Sr	Velma Jackson HS	Camden, MS
G	12	Robert Woodard II	6 ft 7 in (2.01 m)	230 lb (104 kg)	Fr	Columbus HS	Columbus, MS
F	15	Prince Oduro (redshirt)	6 ft 8 in (2.03 m)	255 lb (116 kg)	So	First Love Christian Academy; Siena	Toronto, ON
F	22	KeyShawn Feazell	6 ft 8 in (2.03 m)	230 lb (104 kg)	So	Lawrence County HS	New Hebron, MS
G	23	Tyson Carter	6 ft 4 in (1.93 m)	165 lb (75 kg)	Jr	Starkville HS	Starkville, MS
F	24	Abdul Ado	6 ft 11 in (2.11 m)	250 lb (113 kg)	RS So	Hamilton Heights HS	Chattanooga, TN
F	30	Andrew Junkin (W)	6 ft 11 in (2.11 m)	240 lb (109 kg)	Fr	New Hope HS	New Hope, MS
F	35	Aric Holman	6 ft 10 in (2.08 m)	225 lb (102 kg)	Sr	Owensboro HS	Owensboro, KY
F	42	Jethro Tshisumpa	6 ft 10 in (2.08 m)	260 lb (118 kg)	Jr	Mountain Mission; San Jacinto College	Lubumbashi, Congo
C	45	E. J. Datcher	6 ft 10 in (2.08 m)	250 lb (113 kg)	Jr	Vincent HS	Vincent, AL

Head coach

- Ben Howland (Weber State)

Assistant coach(es)

- George Brooks (Mississippi State)
- Korey McCray (Mercer)
- Ernie Zeigler (Cleary)

Legend

- (C) Team captain
- (S) Suspended
- (I) Ineligible
- (W) Walk-on
- Injured
- Current redshirt

Roster

== Schedule and results ==
Date time, TV	Rank^{#}	Opponent^{#}	Result	Record	High points	High rebounds	High assists	Site (attendance) city, state
Exhibition
November 4, 2018*; 2:00 pm, SECN+	No. 18	Georgia Southwestern State	W 88–57		17 – Peters	12 – Perry	5 – Peters	Humphrey Coliseum (2,621); Starkville, MS
Non-conference regular season
November 9, 2018*; 6:30 pm, SECN+	No. 18	Austin Peay	W 95–67	1–0	21 – Q. Weatherspoon	10 – Holman	7 – Peters	Humphrey Coliseum (5,977); Starkville, MS
November 11, 2018*; 4:00 pm, SECN	No. 18	Hartford; MGM Resorts Main Event campus-site game	W 77–59	2–0	22 – Q. Weatherspoon	10 – Ado	4 – Peters	Humphrey Coliseum (5,953); Starkville, MS
November 16, 2018*; 8:00 pm, SECN	No. 17	Long Beach State; MGM Resorts Main Event campus-site game	W 79–51	3–0	21 – Q. Weatherspoon	14 – Perry	4 – Tied	Humphrey Coliseum (8,106); Starkville, MS
November 19, 2018*; 10:00 pm, ESPNU	No. 15	vs. Arizona State; MGM Resorts Main Event Heavyweight semifinals	L 67–72	3–1	22 – Holman	10 – Holman	6 – Peters	T-Mobile Arena (2,507); Paradise, NV
November 20, 2018*; 7:30 pm	No. 15	vs. Saint Mary's; MGM Resorts Main Event Heavyweight	W 61–57	4–1	12 – Tied	11 – Holman	5 – Peters	T-Mobile Arena (3,157); Paradise, NV
November 26, 2018*; 7:00 pm, SECN+	No. 25	Alcorn State	W 88–65	5–1	17 – Tied	11 – Perry	7 – Peters	Humphrey Coliseum (6,537); Starkville, MS
November 30, 2018*; 6:00 pm, CBSSN	No. 25	at Dayton	W 65–58	6–1	21 – Q. Weatherspoon	12 – Q. Weatherspoon	8 – Peters	UD Arena (13,455); Dayton, OH
December 4, 2018*; 7:00 pm, SECN+	No. 22	McNeese State	W 90–77	7–1	27 – Peters	11 – Holman	5 – Peters	Humphrey Coliseum (6,437); Starkville, MS
December 8, 2018*; 3:00 pm, ESPN2	No. 22	vs. Clemson; Never Forget Tribute Classic	W 82–71	8–1	28 – Peters	7 – Q. Weatherspoon	6 – N. Weatherspoon	Prudential Center (7,142); Newark, NJ
December 15, 2018*; 7:30 pm, SECN	No. 18	Cincinnati	W 70–59	9–1	14 – Tied	10 – Holman	9 – Peters	Humphrey Coliseum (9,120); Starkville, MS
December 19, 2018*; 7:00 pm, SECN+	No. 17	Wofford	W 98–87	10–1	19 – Tied	8 – Holman	8 – Peters	Humphrey Coliseum (6,443); Starkville, MS
December 22, 2018*; 6:00 pm, SECN	No. 17	vs. Wright State; Jackson Showcase	W 67–63	11–1	14 – Q. Weatherspoon	9 – Holman	6 – Peters	Mississippi Coliseum (3,021); Jackson, MS
December 29, 2018*; 11:00 am, ESPNU	No. 19	BYU	W 103–81	12–1	28 – Holman	8 – Tied	6 – Peters	Humphrey Coliseum (10,202); Starkville, MS
SEC regular season
January 8, 2019; 8:00 pm, ESPNU	No. 14	at South Carolina	L 82–87 ^{OT}	12–2 (0–1)	20 – Holman	10 – Holman	7 – Peters	Colonial Life Arena (8,776); Columbia, SC
January 12, 2019; 12:00 pm, CBS	No. 14	Ole Miss	L 77–81	12–3 (0–2)	18 – Q. Weatherspoon	11 – Ado	4 – Peters	Humphrey Coliseum (10,021); Starkville, MS
January 15, 2019; 6:00 pm, SECN	No. 24	Florida	W 71–68	13–3 (1–2)	16 – Peters	5 – Tied	6 – Peters	Humphrey Coliseum (7,501); Starkville, MS
January 19, 2019; 7:30 pm, SECN	No. 24	at Vanderbilt	W 71–55	14–3 (2–2)	17 – Q. Weatherspoon	9 – Holman	4 – Q. Weatherspoon	Memorial Gymnasium (9,570); Nashville, TN
January 22, 2019; 6:00 pm, ESPN	No. 22	at No. 8 Kentucky	L 55–76	14–4 (2–3)	19 – Q. Weatherspoon	13 – Woodard II	3 – Peters	Rupp Arena (21,449); Lexington, KY
January 26, 2019; 7:00 pm, SECN	No. 22	No. 16 Auburn	W 92–84	15–4 (3–3)	27 – Q. Weatherspoon	11 – Perry	10 – Peters	Humphrey Coliseum (10,063); Starkville, MS
January 29, 2019; 7:30 pm, SECN	No. 22	at Alabama	L 79–83	15–5 (3–4)	18 – Perry	8 – Holman	4 – Peters	Coleman Coliseum (11,632); Tuscaloosa, AL
February 2, 2019; 2:30 pm, SECN	No. 22	at Ole Miss	W 81–75	16–5 (4–4)	27 – Q. Weatherspoon	11 – Perry	6 – Peters	The Pavilion at Ole Miss (9,500); Oxford, MS
February 6, 2019; 8:00 pm, ESPN2		No. 21 LSU	L 88–92 ^{OT}	16–6 (4–5)	27 – Q. Weatherspoon	10 – Perry	6 – Peters	Humphrey Coliseum (7,456); Starkville, MS
February 9, 2019; 12:00 pm, CBS		No. 5 Kentucky	L 67–71	16–7 (4–6)	16 – Peters	5 – Woodard II	3 – Q. Weatherspoon	Humphrey Coliseum (9,019); Starkville, MS
February 12, 2019; 8:00 pm, SECN		Alabama	W 81–62	17–7 (5–6)	22 – Peters	10 – Perry	6 – Q. Weatherspoon	Humphrey Coliseum (8,022); Starkville, MS
February 16, 2019; 7:30 pm, SECN		at Arkansas	W 77–67	18–7 (6–6)	22 – Q. Weatherspoon	10 – Perry	4 – Carter	Bud Walton Arena (17,022); Fayetteville, AR
February 20, 2019; 5:30 pm, SECN		at Georgia	W 68–67	19–7 (7–6)	31 – Q. Weatherspoon	6 – Tied	4 – Carter	Stegeman Coliseum (7,153); Athens, GA
February 23, 2019; 5:00 pm, SECN		South Carolina	W 76–61	20–7 (8–6)	21 – Perry	6 – Perry	9 – Peters	Humphrey Coliseum (8,655); Starkville, MS
February 26, 2019; 6:00 pm, SECN		Missouri	W 68–49	21–7 (9–6)	24 – Carter	9 – Perry	5 – Peters	Humphrey Coliseum (7,058); Starkville, MS
March 2, 2019; 3:00 pm, ESPNU		at Auburn	L 75–80	21–8 (9–7)	25 – Q. Weatherspoon	14 – Perry	6 – Q. Weatherspoon	Auburn Arena (9,121); Auburn, AL
March 5, 2019; 8:00 pm, SECN		at No. 5 Tennessee	L 54–71	21–9 (9–8)	14 – Carter	12 – Perry	3 – Tied	Thompson–Boling Arena (20,555); Knoxville, TN
March 9, 2019; 1:00 pm, ESPN2		Texas A&M	W 92–81	22–9 (10–8)	21 – Peters	9 – Holman	8 – Peters	Humphrey Coliseum (8,732); Starkville, MS
SEC tournament
March 14, 2019; 8:00 pm, SECN	(6)	vs. (11) Texas A&M; Second Round	W 80–54	23–9	15 – Peters	8 – Woodard	9 – Q. Weatherspoon	Bridgestone Arena (14,813); Nashville, TN
March 15, 2019; 8:00 pm, SECN	(6)	vs. (3) No. 8 Tennessee; Quarterfinals	L 76–83	23–10	20 – Holman	12 – Perry	5 – Peters	Bridgestone Arena (19,575); Nashville, TN
NCAA tournament
March 22, 2019*; 6:27 pm, truTV	(5 E)	vs. (12 E) Liberty; First Round	L 76–80	23–11	27 – Q. Weatherspoon	10 – Perry	5 – Peters	SAP Center (12,824); San Jose, CA
*Non-conference game. ^{#}Rankings from AP Poll. (#) Tournament seedings in parentheses. All times are in Central Time.

== Rankings ==
Ranking movements Legend: ██ Increase in ranking ██ Decrease in ranking — = Not ranked RV = Received votes
	Week																			
Poll	Pre	1	2	3	4	5	6	7	8	9	10	11	12	13	14	15	16	17	18	Final
AP	18	17	15	25	22	18	17	19	17	14	24	22	22	RV	—	RV				Not released
Coaches	19	19^	15	25	22	17	16	17	16	14	23	22	21	22	—	RV				RV

*AP does not release post-NCAA Tournament rankings
^Coaches did not release a Week 2 poll.
