= John Fulkerson =

American basketball player (born 1997)

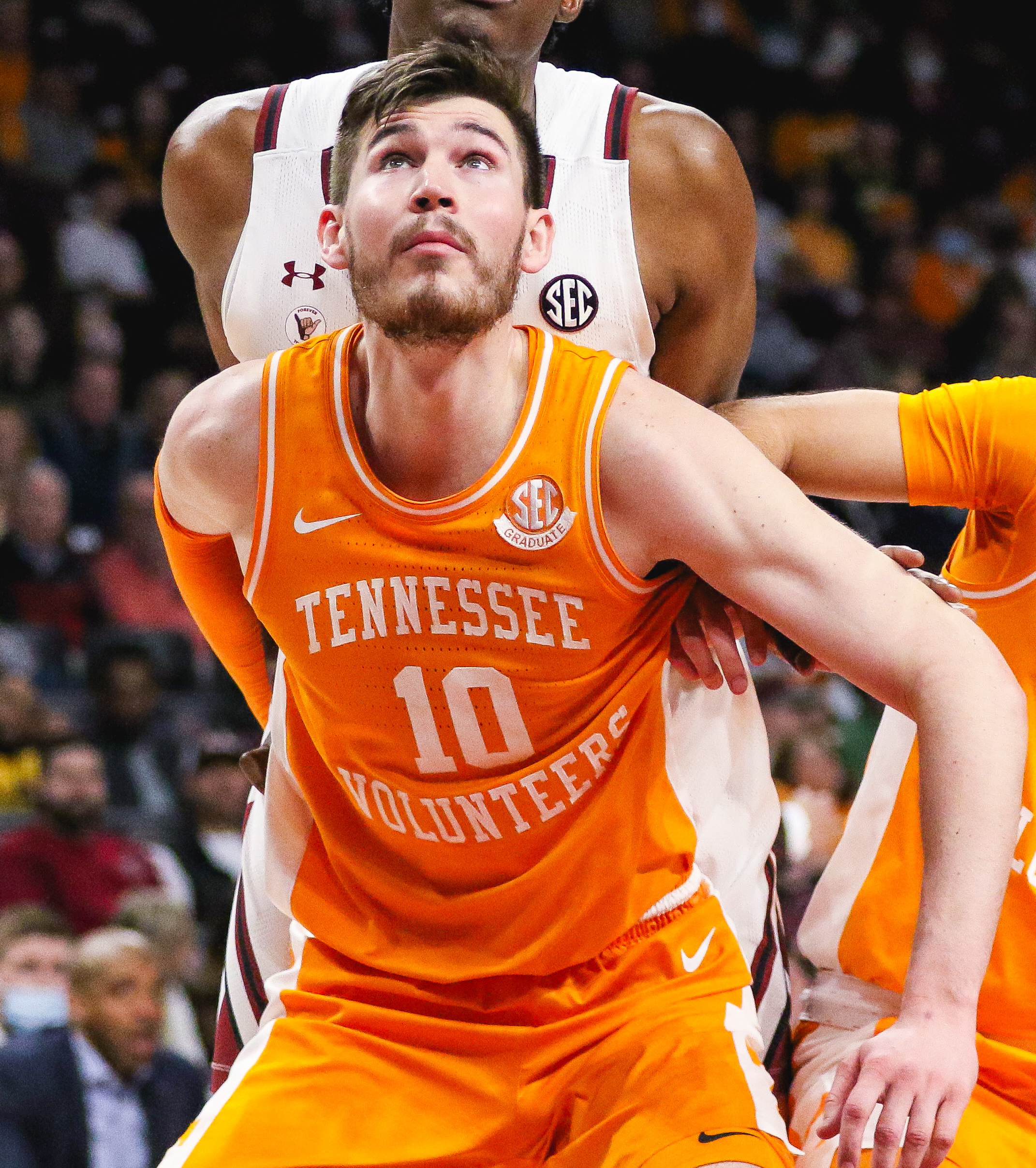
- Fulkerson with Tennessee in 2022

Free agent
- Position: Power forward / center

Personal information
- Born: April 29, 1997 (age 29) Kingsport, Tennessee, U.S.
- Listed height: 6 ft 9 in (2.06 m)
- Listed weight: 220 lb (100 kg)

Career information
- High school: Dobyns-Bennett (Kingsport, Tennessee); Christ School (Arden, North Carolina)
- College: Tennessee (2016–2022)
- NBA draft: 2022: undrafted
- Playing career: 2022–present

Career history
- 2022–2024: Leuven Bears
- 2024–2025: Dziki Warsaw

Career highlights
- Second-team All-SEC – Coaches (2020)

John Michael Fulkerson (born April 29, 1997) is an American professional basketball player who is currently a free agent. He played college basketball for the Tennessee Volunteers.

== High school career ==
In his first two years of high school, Fulkerson played basketball for Dobyns-Bennett High School in his hometown of Kingsport, Tennessee, before transferring to Christ School in Arden, North Carolina to gain more exposure. As a junior, he averaged 10 points, 6.1 rebounds and 2.8 blocks per game, tying a school record with 93 blocks. In his senior season, Fulkerson averaged 14.5 points, 11.1 rebounds, 4.3 assists and 3.5 blocks per game, breaking Marshall Plumlee's school single-season blocks record with 112. He earned NCISAA 3-A All-State accolades and was named Carolinas Athletic Association Player of the Year.

=== Recruiting ===
Fulkerson was considered a three-star recruit by 247Sports and Rivals. On November 6, 2015, he committed to play college basketball for Tennessee over 20 other NCAA Division I programs, including Georgia and Clemson. He was drawn to the Volunteers because he had grown up supporting the team.

College recruiting
Name	Hometown	School	Height	Weight	Commit date
John Fulkerson; PF	Kingsport, TN	Christ School (NC)	6 ft 7 in (2.01 m)	200 lb (91 kg)	Nov 6, 2015
John Fulkerson; PF	Recruit ratings: Rivals: 247Sports:				
Overall recruit ranking: Rivals: — 247Sports: 184 ESPN: —
Note: In many cases, Scout, Rivals, 247Sports, On3, and ESPN may conflict in their listings of height and weight.; In these cases, the average was taken. ESPN grades are on a 100-point scale.; Sources: "Tennessee 2016 Basketball Commitments". Rivals.; "2016 Tennessee Volunteers Recruiting Class". ESPN.; "2016 Team Ranking". Rivals.

== College career ==
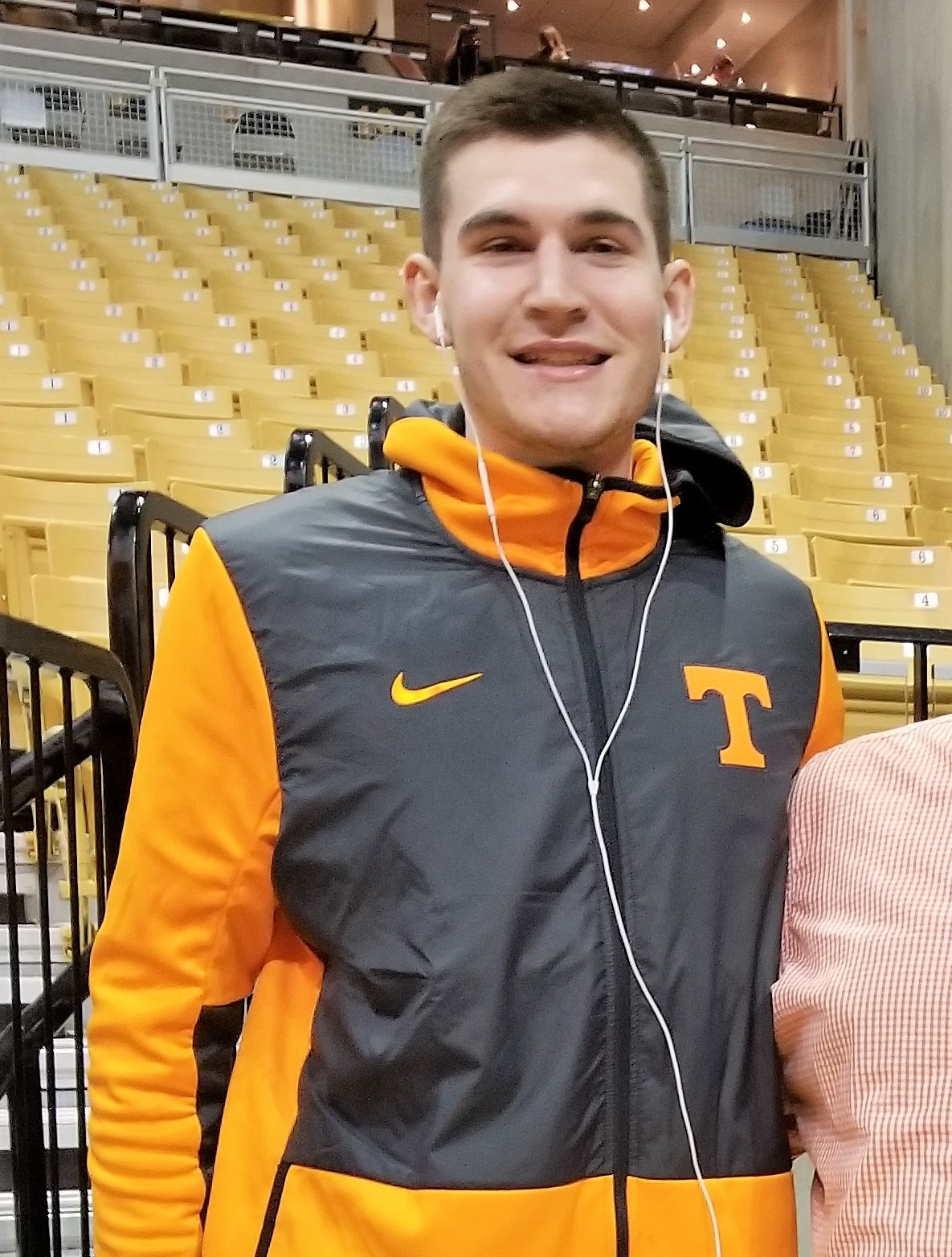
Fulkerson in January 2019

On November 22, 2016, in his first season at Tennessee, Fulkerson recorded 12 points, 10 rebounds and five blocks in a 69–65 overtime loss to 13th-ranked Oregon. On December 15 against Lipscomb, he fractured his right wrist and dislocated his right elbow, sidelining him for the remainder of the season. Fulkerson underwent surgery for the injury and was granted a medical redshirt. Before playing another game, he suffered a torn labrum in his left shoulder that required another surgery. In his following season, as a redshirt freshman, Fulkerson averaged 9.3 minutes per game. In his sophomore season, he served as Tennessee's primary frontcourt player off the bench. On December 29, 2018, Fulkerson scored a season-high 15 points in a 96–53 win over Tennessee Tech. As a sophomore, he averaged 3.1 points and 2.6 rebounds per game.

In his junior season, Fulkerson was placed in a more important role with the departures of Grant Williams and Kyle Alexander. On February 15, 2020, Fulkerson posted 25 points in a 63–61 loss to South Carolina. On March 3, he scored a career-high 27 points to help unranked Tennessee overcome a 17-point deficit and upset sixth-ranked Kentucky, 81–73. Fulkerson finished the season averaging 13.7 points and 5.9 rebounds per game and was named to the Second Team All-Southeastern Conference (SEC) by the league's coaches. He led his team in scoring, rebounding and steals, while shooting 61.2 percent from the field, which ranked second in the SEC and fourth in school history.

Fulkerson suffered a concussion and facial fracture during Tennessee's 78–64 win over Florida in the 2021 SEC Tournament, forcing him to miss the remaining two games of the season. As a senior, Fulkerson averaged 9.5 points and 5.5 rebounds per game. He decided to return for a sixth season in April, taking advantage of the NCAA's granting of an additional year of eligibility due to the COVID-19 pandemic. Fulkerson underwent wrist surgery in June 2021.

Due to his East Tennessee upbringing, humble personality, the length of his college career, and his style of play, Fulkerson cemented himself as an all-time fan favorite among Volunteer fans. During his career, signs reading “The Incredible Fulk” would often be seen from the Tennessee student section.

== Professional career ==
On July 29, 2022, he has signed with Leuven Bears of the BNXT League.

On December 26, 2024, he signed with Dziki Warsaw of the Polish Basketball League (PLK).

== Career statistics ==
Legend
GP	Games played	GS	Games started	MPG	Minutes per game
FG%	Field goal percentage	3P%	3-point field goal percentage	FT%	Free throw percentage
RPG	Rebounds per game	APG	Assists per game	SPG	Steals per game
BPG	Blocks per game	PPG	Points per game	**Bold**	Career high

=== College ===
Year	Team	GP	GS	MPG	FG%	3P%	FT%	RPG	APG	SPG	BPG	PPG
2016–17	Tennessee	10	6	16.0	.567	–	.650	4.6	1.0	**1.1**	**.9**	4.7
2017–18	Tennessee	30	1	9.3	.429	–	.727	1.6	.5	.5	.3	1.7
2018–19	Tennessee	**36**	0	12.0	.583	–	.644	2.6	.7	.5	.7	3.1
2019–20	Tennessee	31	**31**	**30.1**	**.612**	**.500**	**.748**	**5.9**	1.3	**1.1**	**.9**	**13.7**
2020–21	Tennessee	25	24	26.4	.527	.000	.747	5.5	**1.7**	.5	.6	9.5
Career		132	62	18.7	.567	.200	.726	3.9	1.0	.7	.6	6.6
