= 2018–19 Alabama Crimson Tide men's basketball team =

American college basketball season

2018–19 Alabama Crimson Tide men's basketball

NIT, first round
- Conference: Southeastern Conference
- Record: 18–16 (8–10 SEC)
- Head coach: Avery Johnson (4th season)
- Assistant coaches: John Pelphrey (3rd season); Antoine Pettway (7th season); Yasir Rosemond (2nd season)
- Home arena: Coleman Coliseum

2018–19 Southeastern Conference men's basketball standings
	Conf.				Overall
Team	W		L	PCT	W		L	PCT
No. 15 LSU	16	–	2	.889	28	–	7	.800
No. 10 Tennessee	15	–	3	.833	31	–	6	.838
No. 7 Kentucky	15	–	3	.833	30	–	7	.811
No. 5 Auburn†	11	–	7	.611	30	–	10	.750
South Carolina	11	–	7	.611	16	–	16	.500
Mississippi State	10	–	8	.556	23	–	11	.676
Ole Miss	10	–	8	.556	20	–	13	.606
Florida	9	–	9	.500	20	–	16	.556
Alabama	8	–	10	.444	18	–	16	.529
Arkansas	8	–	10	.444	18	–	16	.529
Texas A&M	6	–	12	.333	14	–	18	.438
Missouri	5	–	13	.278	15	–	17	.469
Georgia	2	–	16	.111	11	–	21	.344
Vanderbilt	0	–	18	.000	9	–	23	.281
† 2019 SEC tournament winner Rankings from AP Poll

The 2018–19 Alabama Crimson Tide men's basketball team represented the University of Alabama in the 2018–19 NCAA Division I men's basketball season. The team was led by fourth-year head coach Avery Johnson and played its home games at Coleman Coliseum in Tuscaloosa, Alabama as a member of the Southeastern Conference. They finished the season 18–16, 8–10 in SEC play to finish in a tie for ninth place in SEC play. They defeated Ole Miss to advance to the quarterfinals of the SEC tournament where they lost to Kentucky. They received an invitation to the National Invitation Tournament where they lost in the first round to Norfolk State.

On March 24, 2019, the school fired head coach Avery Johnson. A few days later, the school hired Buffalo head coach Nate Oats as coach.

== Previous season ==
The Crimson Tide finished the 2017–18 season 20–16, 8–10 in SEC play to finish in a tie for ninth place. They defeated Texas A&M and Auburn in the SEC tournament before losing in the semifinals to Kentucky. They received an at-large bid to the NCAA tournament where they defeated Virginia Tech in the first round before losing in the second round to Villanova.

== Offseason ==
=== Departures ===
Name	Number	Pos.	Height	Weight	Year	Hometown	Reason for departure
Collin Sexton	2	G	6'3"	190	Freshman	Mableton, GA	Declared for the 2018 NBA draft; selected 8th overall by the Cleveland Cavaliers
Ar'Mond Davis	22	G	6'6"	193	Senior	Tacoma, WA	Graduated
Braxton Key	25	F	6'8"	225	Sophomore	Decatur, GA	Transferred to Virginia
Landon Fuller	33	F	6'8"	222	Sophomore	Brentwood, TN	Left team

=== 2018 recruiting class ===
College recruiting information
Name	Hometown	School	Height	Weight	Commit date
Javian Fleming; C	Canton, MS	Canton High School	6 ft 9 in (2.06 m)	230 lb (100 kg)	Nov 3, 2017
Javian Fleming; C	Recruit ratings: Scout: Rivals: 247Sports: ESPN: (82)				
Diante Wood; SG	Anniston, AL	Sacred Heart Catholic School	6 ft 4 in (1.93 m)	175 lb (79 kg)	Nov 8, 2017
Diante Wood; SG	Recruit ratings: Scout: Rivals: 247Sports: ESPN: (82)				
Kira Lewis Jr. PG	Meridianville, AL	Hazel Green High School	6 ft 2 in (1.88 m)	165 lb (75 kg)	Aug 10, 2018
Kira Lewis Jr. PG	Recruit ratings: Scout: Rivals: 247Sports: ESPN: (87)				
Overall recruit ranking:
Note: In many cases, Scout, Rivals, 247Sports, On3, and ESPN may conflict in their listings of height and weight.; In these cases, the average was taken. ESPN grades are on a 100-point scale.; Sources: "2018 Alabama Commits". Rivals.; "2018 Team Ranking". Rivals.

== Roster ==
2018–19 Alabama Crimson Tide men's basketball team
Players
Coaches

Pos.	#	Name	Height	Weight	Year	Previous school	Hometown
F/C	0	Donta Hall	6 ft 10 in (2.08 m)	230 lb (104 kg)	Sr	Luverne HS	Luverne, AL
G/F	1	Riley Norris	6 ft 7 in (2.01 m)	212 lb (96 kg)	RS Sr	Albertville HS	Albertville, AL
G	2	Kira Lewis Jr.	6 ft 3 in (1.91 m)	167 lb (76 kg)	Fr	Hazel Green HS	Meridianville, AL
F	3	Alex Reese	6 ft 9 in (2.06 m)	238 lb (108 kg)	So	Pelham HS	Pelham, AL
F/C	4	Daniel Giddens	6 ft 11 in (2.11 m)	247 lb (112 kg)	RS Jr	Ohio State	Mableton, GA
G	5	Avery Johnson Jr.	5 ft 11 in (1.8 m)	187 lb (85 kg)	RS Sr	Texas A&M	Houston, TX
G	10	Herbert Jones	6 ft 7 in (2.01 m)	206 lb (93 kg)	So	Hale County HS	Greensboro, AL
G	12	Dazon Ingram	6 ft 5 in (1.96 m)	210 lb (95 kg)	RS Jr	Theodore HS	Theodore, AL
C	13	Javian Davis-Fleming	6 ft 9 in (2.06 m)	268 lb (122 kg)	Fr	Canton HS	Canton, MS
F	15	Tyler Barnes (W)	6 ft 8 in (2.03 m)	205 lb (93 kg)	So	St. Xavier HS	Louisville, KY
G	22	Diante Wood	6 ft 4 in (1.93 m)	206 lb (93 kg)	Fr	Sacred Heart Catholic HS	Anniston, AL
G	23	John Petty Jr.	6 ft 5 in (1.96 m)	197 lb (89 kg)	So	Jemison HS	Huntsville, AL
G	24	Lawson Schaffer (W)	5 ft 11 in (1.8 m)	168 lb (76 kg)	Sr	Cullman HS	Cullman, AL
C	30	Galin Smith	6 ft 9 in (2.06 m)	245 lb (111 kg)	So	Clinton HS	Clinton, MS
G/F	34	Tevin Mack	6 ft 6 in (1.98 m)	225 lb (102 kg)	RS Jr	Texas	Columbia, SC

Head coach

- Avery Johnson (Southern)

Assistant coach(es)

- John Pelphrey (Kentucky)
- Antoine Pettway (Alabama)
- Yasir Rosemond (Oregon)

Strength and conditioning coach(es)

- Lou DeNeen (South Florida)

Legend

- (C) Team captain
- (S) Suspended
- (I) Ineligible
- (W) Walk-on
- Injured
- Current redshirt

Roster

== Schedule and results ==
Date time, TV	Rank^{#}	Opponent^{#}	Result	Record	High points	High rebounds	High assists	Site (attendance) city, state
Exhibition
October 30, 2018*; 7:00 pm, SECN+		Montevallo	W 82–40		12 – Petty	11 – Hall	5 – Ingram	Coleman Coliseum; Tuscaloosa, AL
Regular season
November 6, 2018*; 7:00 pm, SECN+		Southern	W 82–62	1–0	20 – Hall	9 – Jones	7 – Lewis	Coleman Coliseum (9,793); Tuscaloosa, AL
November 11, 2018*; 6:00 pm, SECN		Appalachian State	W 81–73	2–0	21 – Lewis	12 – Hall	4 – Jones	Coleman Coliseum (9,701); Tuscaloosa, AL
November 15, 2018*; 1:00 pm, ESPNU		vs. Northeastern; Charleston Classic Quarterfinals	L 52–68	2–1	17 – Petty	5 – Ingram	2 – Hall	TD Arena (2,648); Charleston, SC
November 16, 2018*; 12:00 pm, ESPNU		vs. Ball State; Charleston Classic Consolation 2nd round	W 79–61	3–1	20 – Mack	12 – Hall	7 – Petty	TD Arena (2,752); Charleston, SC
November 18, 2018*; 12:30 pm, ESPNU		vs. Wichita State; Charleston Classic 5th place game	W 90–86	4–1	24 – Lewis	6 – Jones	5 – Ingram	TD Arena (2,862); Charleston, SC
November 26, 2018*; 7:00 pm, SECN+		Murray State	W 78–72	5–1	20 – Lewis	8 – Jones	4 – Jones	Coleman Coliseum (9,004); Tuscaloosa, AL
November 29, 2018*; 6:00 pm, ESPNU		at UCF	L 64–70	5–2	14 – Tied	9 – Hall	4 – Ingram	CFE Arena (4,449); Orlando, FL
December 4, 2018*; 7:00 pm, SECN+		Georgia State	L 80–83	5–3	19 – Lewis	11 – Hall	2 – Tied	Coleman Coliseum (9,076); Tuscaloosa, AL
December 9, 2018*; 12:00 pm, ESPN		Arizona	W 76–73	6–3	20 – Lewis	9 – Hall	4 – Petty	Coleman Coliseum (9,581); Tuscaloosa, AL
December 18, 2018*; 7:00 pm, SECN+		vs. Liberty; Rocket City Classic	W 84–75	7–3	21 – Hall	5 – Hall	4 – Lewis	Von Braun Center (5,781); Huntsville, AL
December 21, 2018*; 8:00 pm, SECN		Penn State	W 73–64	8–3	17 – Hall	11 – Hall	4 – Tied	Coleman Coliseum (10,142); Tuscaloosa, AL
December 30, 2018*; 5:00 pm, ESPNU		at Stephen F. Austin	W 79–69	9–3	17 – Lewis	14 – Hall	8 – Lewis	William R. Johnson Coliseum (7,203); Nacogdoches, TX
January 5, 2019; 12:00 pm, ESPN		No. 13 Kentucky	W 77–75	10–3 (1–0)	22 – Mack	10 – Hall	6 – Jones	Coleman Coliseum (12,424); Tuscaloosa, AL
January 8, 2019; 8:00 pm, SECN		at LSU	L 79–88	10–4 (1–1)	15 – Lewis	8 – Petty	5 – Jones	Pete Maravich Assembly Center (9,718); Baton Rouge, LA
January 12, 2019; 2:30 pm, SECN		Texas A&M	L 80–81	10–5 (1–2)	22 – Petty	16 – Hall	3 – Tied	Coleman Coliseum (12,288); Tuscaloosa, AL
January 16, 2019; 8:00 pm, SECN		at Missouri	W 70-60	11–5 (2–2)	14 – Johnson Jr.	11 – Hall	3 – Ingram	Mizzou Arena (8,530); Columbia, MO
January 19, 2019; 1:00 pm, ESPN2		at No. 3 Tennessee	L 68–71	11–6 (2–3)	30 – Petty	12 – Hall	5 – Ingram	Thompson–Boling Arena (21,957); Knoxville, TN
January 22, 2019; 8:00 pm, ESPNU		No. 20 Ole Miss	W 74–53	12–6 (3–3)	15 – Petty	10 – Hall	2 – Tied	Coleman Coliseum (10,710); Tuscaloosa, AL
January 26, 2019*; 11:00 am, ESPNU		at Baylor; Big 12/SEC Challenge	L 68–73	12–7	16 – Norris	7 – Hall	6 – Lewis Jr.	Ferrell Center (7,094); Waco, TX
January 29, 2019; 7:30 pm, SECN		No. 22 Mississippi State	W 83–79	13–7 (4–3)	19 – Hall	8 – Mack	3 – Lewis Jr.	Coleman Coliseum (11,632); Tuscaloosa, AL
February 2, 2019; 7:00 pm, ESPN2		at Auburn; Iron Bowl of Basketball	L 63–84	13–8 (4–4)	18 – Petty	10 – Hall	4 – Ingram	Auburn Arena (9,121); Auburn, AL
February 6, 2019; 8:00 pm, SECN		Georgia	W 89–74	14–8 (5–4)	25 – Mack	8 – Hall	7 – Lewis Jr.	Coleman Coliseum (10,541); Tuscaloosa, AL
February 9, 2019; 7:30 pm, SECN		at Vanderbilt	W 77-67	15-8 (6-4)	18 – Lewis Jr.	12 – Norris	4 – Lewis Jr.	Memorial Gymnasium (10,539); Nashville, TN
February 12, 2019; 8:00 pm, SECN		at Mississippi State	L 62–81	15–9 (6–5)	17 – Lewis Jr.	7 – Hall	3 – Tied	Humphrey Coliseum (8,022); Starkville, MS
February 16, 2019; 1:00 pm, ESPNU		Florida	L 53–71	15–10 (6–6)	14 – Lewis Jr.	7 – Hall	2 – Tied	Coleman Coliseum (12,148); Tuscaloosa, AL
February 19, 2019; 8:00 pm, SECN		at Texas A&M	L 56–65	15–11 (6–7)	14 – Mack	6 – Petty	4 – Lewis Jr.	Reed Arena (5,459); College Station, TX
February 23, 2019; 5:00 pm, ESPNU		Vanderbilt	W 68–61	16–11 (7–7)	19 – Lewis Jr.	11 – Hall	6 – Ingram	Coleman Coliseum (11,020); Tuscaloosa, AL
February 26, 2019; 6:00 pm, ESPN2		at South Carolina	W 68–62	17–11 (8–7)	17 – Lewis Jr.	10 – Tied	3 – Tied	Colonial Life Arena (11,164); Columbia, SC
March 2, 2019; 11:00 am, ESPN		No. 13 LSU	L 69–74	17–12 (8–8)	23 – Petty	10 – Hall	5 – Jones	Coleman Coliseum (11,570); Tuscaloosa, AL
March 5, 2019; 8:00 pm, ESPNU		Auburn; Iron Bowl of Basketball	L 60–66	17–13 (8–9)	13 – Lewis Jr.	8 – Hall	3 – Tied	Coleman Coliseum (11,865); Tuscaloosa, AL
March 9, 2019; 5:00 pm, SECN		at Arkansas	L 70–82	17–14 (8–10)	14 – Mack	8 – Hall	2 – Tied	Bud Walton Arena (16,253); Fayetteville, AR
SEC Tournament
March 14, 2019; 6:00 pm, SECN	(10)	vs. (7) Ole Miss; Second Round	W 62–57	18–14	21 – Mack	15 – Hall	5 – Norris	Bridgestone Arena; Nashville, TN
March 15, 2019; 6:00 pm, SECN	(10)	vs. (2) No. 4 Kentucky; Quarterfinals	L 55–73	18–15	15 – Reese	6 – Tied	3 – Petty	Bridgestone Arena; Nashville, TN
National Invitation Tournament
March 20, 2019*; 6:00 pm, ESPNU	(1)	(8) Norfolk State; First round – Alabama bracket	L 79–80 ^{OT}	18–16	18 – Jones	12 – Hall	6 – Ingram	Coleman Coliseum (2,086); Tuscaloosa, AL
*Non-conference game. ^{#}Rankings from AP Poll. (#) Tournament seedings in parentheses. All times are in Central Time.
