= 2019 SEC men's basketball tournament =

2019 basketball tournament in the US

- Classification: Division I
- Season: 2018–19
- Teams: 14
- Site: Bridgestone Arena; Nashville, TN
- Champions: Auburn (2nd title)
- Winning coach: Bruce Pearl (1st title)
- MVP: Bryce Brown (Auburn)
- Attendance: 114,832
- Television: SEC Network, ESPN

2018–19 Southeastern Conference men's basketball standings
	Conf.				Overall
Team	W		L	PCT	W		L	PCT
No. 15 LSU	16	–	2	.889	28	–	7	.800
No. 10 Tennessee	15	–	3	.833	31	–	6	.838
No. 7 Kentucky	15	–	3	.833	30	–	7	.811
No. 5 Auburn†	11	–	7	.611	30	–	10	.750
South Carolina	11	–	7	.611	16	–	16	.500
Mississippi State	10	–	8	.556	23	–	11	.676
Ole Miss	10	–	8	.556	20	–	13	.606
Florida	9	–	9	.500	20	–	16	.556
Alabama	8	–	10	.444	18	–	16	.529
Arkansas	8	–	10	.444	18	–	16	.529
Texas A&M	6	–	12	.333	14	–	18	.438
Missouri	5	–	13	.278	15	–	17	.469
Georgia	2	–	16	.111	11	–	21	.344
Vanderbilt	0	–	18	.000	9	–	23	.281
† 2019 SEC tournament winner Rankings from AP Poll

The 2019 Southeastern Conference men's basketball tournament was a postseason men's basketball tournament for the Southeastern Conference at Bridgestone Arena in Nashville, Tennessee, from March 13–17, 2019. Auburn defeated Tennessee, 84–64, in the championship game to earn an automatic bid to the 2019 NCAA Division I men's basketball tournament.

== Seeds ==
Seed	School	Conference record	Tiebreaker(s)
1	LSU^{‡†}	16–2	
2	Kentucky^{†}	15–3	1–1 vs. Tennessee, 2–0 vs. Auburn
3	Tennessee^{†}	15–3	1–1 vs. Kentucky, 0–1 vs. Auburn
4	South Carolina^{†}	11–7	1–0 vs. Auburn
5	Auburn^{#}	11–7	0–1 vs. South Carolina
6	Mississippi State^{#}	10–8	1–1 vs. Ole Miss, 1–1 vs. South Carolina
7	Ole Miss^{#}	10–8	1–1 vs. Mississippi State, 0–1 vs. South Carolina
8	Florida^{#}	9–9	
9	Arkansas^{#}	8–10	1–0 vs. Alabama
10	Alabama^{#}	8–10	0–1 vs. Arkansas
11	Texas A&M	6–12	
12	Missouri	5–13	
13	Georgia	2–16	
14	Vanderbilt	0–18	
‡ – SEC regular season champion, and tournament No. 1 seed. † – Received a double-bye in the conference tournament. # – Received a single-bye in the conference tournament.

== Schedule ==
Game	Time	Matchup	Score	Television	Attendance
First round – Wednesday, March 13
1	6:00 pm	12 Missouri vs. 13 Georgia	71–61	SEC Network	10,849
2	8:30 pm	11 Texas A&M vs. 14 Vanderbilt	69–52	SEC Network	10,849
Second round – Thursday, March 14
3	Noon	8 Florida vs. 9 Arkansas	66–50	SEC Network	12,720
4	2:30 pm	5 Auburn vs. 12 Missouri	81–71	SEC Network	12,720
5	6:00 pm	7 Ole Miss vs. 10 Alabama	62–57	SEC Network	14,813
6	8:30 pm	6 Mississippi State vs. 11 Texas A&M	80–54	SEC Network	14,813
Quarterfinals – Friday, March 15
7	Noon	1 LSU vs. 8 Florida	73–76	ESPN	16,490
8	2:30 pm	4 South Carolina vs. 5 Auburn	64–73	ESPN	16,490
9	6:00 pm	2 Kentucky vs. 10 Alabama	73–55	SEC Network	19,575
10	8:30 pm	3 Tennessee vs. 6 Mississippi State	83–76	SEC Network	19,575
Semifinals – Saturday, March 16
11	Noon	8 Florida vs. 5 Auburn	62–65	ESPN	20,933
12	2:30 pm	2 Kentucky vs. 3 Tennessee	78–82	ESPN	20,933
Championship – Sunday, March 17
13	Noon	5 Auburn vs. 3 Tennessee	84–64	ESPN	19,452
*Game times in CT. # – Rankings denote tournament seed

== Bracket ==
First round Wednesday, March 13; SECN
12	Missouri	71
13	Georgia	61
11	Texas A&M	69
14	Vanderbilt	52

Second round Thursday, March 14; SECN
8	Florida	66
9	Arkansas	50
5	Auburn	81
12	Missouri	71
7	Ole Miss	57
10	Alabama	62
6	Mississippi State	80
11	Texas A&M	54

Quarterfinals; Friday, March 15; ESPN/SECN
1	LSU	73
8	Florida	76
4	South Carolina	64
5	Auburn	73
2	Kentucky	73
10	Alabama	55
3	Tennessee	83
6	Mississippi State	76

Semifinals; Saturday, March 16; ESPN
8	Florida	62
5	Auburn	65
2	Kentucky	78
3	Tennessee	82

Championship; Sunday, March 17; ESPN
5	Auburn	84
3	Tennessee	64

== Game summaries ==
=== First round ===
SECN

March 13
6:00 pm

No. 13 Georgia 61, No. 12 Missouri 71
Scoring by half: 34–32, 27–39
Pts: J. Harris 26; Rebs: D. Ogbeide 8 Asts: W. Jackson II 5	Pts: J. Geist 30; Rebs: K. Puryear 7 Asts: Tied 1

Bridgestone Arena
Nashville, TN
Attendance: 10,849
Referees: Mike Nance, Jason Baker, Wil Howard

SECN

March 13
8:42 pm

No. 14 Vanderbilt 52, No. 11 Texas A&M 69
Scoring by half: 19–34, 33–35
Pts: S. Lee 19; Rebs: Y. Wetzell 10; Asts: Tied 2	Pts: S. Flagg 29; Rebs: C. Mekowulu 9 Asts: W. Mitchell 3

Bridgestone Arena
Nashville, TN
Attendance: 10,849
Referees: Pat Adams, Steven Anderson, Owen Shortt

=== Second round ===
SECN

March 14
Noon

No. 9 Arkansas 50, No. 8 Florida 66
Scoring by half: 28–30, 22–36
Pts: D. Gafford 15; Rebs: Tied 6 Asts: J. Harris 5	Pts: K. Johnson 20; Rebs: K. Johnson 12; Asts: A. Nembhard 8

Bridgestone Arena
Nashville, TN
Attendance: 12,720
Referees: Todd Austin, Steven Anderson, Rob Rorke

SECN

March 14
2:28 pm

No. 12 Missouri 71, No. 5 Auburn 81
Scoring by half: 30–32, 41–49
Pts: J. Geist 25; Rebs: J. Tilmon 5 Asts: X. Pinson 5	Pts: B. Brown 17; Rebs: H. Spencer 10; Asts: J. Harper 5

Bridgestone Arena
Nashville, TN
Attendance: 12,720
Referees: Pat Adams, Bart Lenox, Owen Shortt

SECN

March 14
6:05 pm

No. 10 Alabama 62, No. 7 Ole Miss 57
Scoring by half: 24–38, 38–19
Pts: T. Mack 21; Rebs: D. Hall 15; Asts: R. Norris 5	Pts: D. Shuler 14; Rebs: D. Shuler 7 Asts: T. Davis 4

Bridgestone Arena
Nashville, TN
Attendance: 14,813
Referees: Doug Shows, Chuck Jones, K.B. Burdett

SECN

March 14
8:30 pm

No. 11 Texas A&M 54, No. 6 Mississippi State 80
Scoring by half: 23–38, 31–42
Pts: S. Flagg 21; Rebs: S. Flagg 10; Asts: Tied 2	Pts: L. Peters 15; Rebs: R. Woodard 8 Asts: Q. Weatherspoon 9

Bridgestone Arena
Nashville, TN
Attendance: 14,813
Referees: Don Daily, Mike Nance, Gerald Williams

=== Quarterfinals ===
ESPN

March 15
Noon

No. 8 Florida 76, No. 1 LSU 73
Scoring by half: 25−35, 51−38
Pts: A. Nembhard 20; Rebs: K. Johnson 10; Asts: A. Nembhard 6	Pts: N. Reid 26; Rebs: N. Reid 14; Asts: T. Waters 7

Bridgestone Arena
Nashville, TN
Attendance: 16,490
Referees: Doug Shows, Chuck Jones, K.B. Burdett

ESPN

March 15
2:30 pm

No. 5 Auburn 73, No. 4 South Carolina 64
Scoring by half: 36–36, 37–28
Pts: J. Harper 27; Rebs: J. Harper 6 Asts: J. Harper 6	Pts: C. Silva 24; Rebs: C. Silva 9 Asts: T. Campbell 5

Bridgestone Arena
Nashville, TN
Attendance: 16,490
Referees: Don Daily, Mike Nance, Jason Baker

SECN

March 15
6:00 pm

No. 10 Alabama 55, No. 2 Kentucky 73
Scoring by half: 29–39, 26–34
Pts: A. Reese 15; Rebs: Tied 6 Asts: J. Petty 3	Pts: T. Herro 20; Rebs: P. Washington 12; Asts: A. Hagans 6

Bridgestone Arena
Nashville, TN
Attendance: 19,575
Referees: Todd Austin, Steven Anderson, Owen Shortt

SECN

March 15
8:30 pm

No. 6 Mississippi State 76, No. 3 Tennessee 83
Scoring by half: 28–34, 48–49
Pts: A. Holman 20; Rebs: R. Perry 12; Asts: L. Peters 5	Pts: A. Schofield 20; Rebs: K. Alexander 9 Asts: J. Bone 9

Bridgestone Arena
Nashville, TN
Attendance: 19,575
Referees: Bart Lenox, Wil Howard, Rob Rorke

=== Semifinals ===
ESPN

March 16
12:03 pm

No. 8 Florida 62, No. 5 Auburn 65
Scoring by half: 34–30, 28–35
Pts: Tied 16; Rebs: K. Hayes 12; Asts: A. Nembhard 5	Pts: J. Harper 20; Rebs: C. Okeke 7 Asts: S. Doughty 4

Bridgestone Arena
Nashville, TN
Attendance: 20,933
Referees: Todd Austin, Chuck Jones, Bart Lenox

ESPN

March 16
2:21 pm

No. 2 Kentucky 78, No. 3 Tennessee 82
Scoring by half: 34–36, 44–46
Pts: P. Washington 16; Rebs: Tied 6 Asts: A. Hagans 12	Pts: A. Schofield 21; Rebs: G. Williams 7 Asts: Tied 5

Bridgestone Arena
Nashville, TN
Attendance: 20,933
Referees: Doug Shows, Don Daily, Steven Anderson

=== Championship ===
ESPN

March 17
12:05 pm

No. 5 Auburn 84, No. 3 Tennessee 64
Scoring by half: 32–23, 52–41
Pts: B. Brown 19; Rebs: C. Okeke 13; Asts: J. Harper 6	Pts: L. Turner 24; Rebs: G. Williams 8 Asts: Tied 2

Bridgestone Arena
Nashville, TN
Attendance: 19,452
Referees: Doug Shows, Don Daily, Chuck Jones

== See also ==
- 2019 SEC women's basketball tournament
