= 2018–19 Auburn Tigers men's basketball team =

American college basketball season

2018–19 Auburn Tigers men's basketball

SEC tournament champions

NCAA tournament, Final Four
- Conference: Southeastern Conference

Ranking
- Coaches: No. 5
- AP: No. 14
- Record: 30–10 (11–7 SEC)
- Head coach: Bruce Pearl (5th season)
- Assistant coaches: Ira Bowman (1st season); Wes Flanigan (1st season); Steven Pearl (2nd season)
- Home arena: Auburn Arena

2018–19 Southeastern Conference men's basketball standings
	Conf.				Overall
Team	W		L	PCT	W		L	PCT
No. 15 LSU	16	–	2	.889	28	–	7	.800
No. 10 Tennessee	15	–	3	.833	31	–	6	.838
No. 7 Kentucky	15	–	3	.833	30	–	7	.811
No. 5 Auburn†	11	–	7	.611	30	–	10	.750
South Carolina	11	–	7	.611	16	–	16	.500
Mississippi State	10	–	8	.556	23	–	11	.676
Ole Miss	10	–	8	.556	20	–	13	.606
Florida	9	–	9	.500	20	–	16	.556
Alabama	8	–	10	.444	18	–	16	.529
Arkansas	8	–	10	.444	18	–	16	.529
Texas A&M	6	–	12	.333	14	–	18	.438
Missouri	5	–	13	.278	15	–	17	.469
Georgia	2	–	16	.111	11	–	21	.344
Vanderbilt	0	–	18	.000	9	–	23	.281
† 2019 SEC tournament winner Rankings from AP Poll

The 2018–19 Auburn Tigers men's basketball team represented Auburn University during the 2018–19 NCAA Division I men's basketball season as a member of the Southeastern Conference. The team's head coach was Bruce Pearl in his 5th season at Auburn. The team played their home games at the Auburn Arena in Auburn, Alabama. They finished the season 30–10, 11–7 in SEC play. They defeated Missouri, South Carolina, Florida, and Tennessee to win the SEC tournament. They received an automatic bid to the NCAA tournament where they defeated New Mexico State, Kansas, North Carolina, and Kentucky to advance to their first Final Four in school history where they lost 63–62 to the eventual champions Virginia.

== Previous season ==
Auburn finished the 2017–18 season 26–8, 13–5 in SEC play to win a share of the SEC regular season championship. They lost to Alabama in the quarterfinals of the SEC tournament. They received an at-large bid to the NCAA tournament where they defeated College of Charleston to advance to the Second Round where they lost to Clemson.

== Offseason ==
=== Departures ===
Name	Number	Pos.	Height	Weight	Year	Hometown	Reason for departure
Mustapha Heron	5	G	6'5"	218	Sophomore	Waterbury, CT	Transferred to St. John's
Davion Mitchell	10	G	6'1"	200	Freshman	Hinesville, GA	Transferred to Baylor
Desean Murray	13	F	6'3"	225	Junior	Stanley, NC	Transferred to Western Kentucky
Patrick Keim	21	G	6'0"	186	Senior	Birmingham, AL	Graduated

=== Incoming transfers ===
Name	Number	Pos.	Height	Weight	Year	Hometown	Previous School
J'Von McCormick	12	G	6'0"	170	Junior	Katy, TX	Lee College
Jamal Johnson		G	6'3"	178	Sophomore	Birmingham, AL	Memphis

== Roster ==
2018–19 Auburn Tigers men's basketball team
Players
Coaches

Pos.	#	Name	Height	Weight	Year	Previous school	Hometown
F	0	Horace Spencer	6 ft 8 in (2.03 m)	225 lb (102 kg)	Sr	Findlay Prep	Warminster, PA
G	1	Jared Harper	5 ft 10 in (1.78 m)	175 lb (79 kg)	Jr	Pebblebrook	Mableton, GA
G	2	Bryce Brown	6 ft 3 in (1.91 m)	198 lb (90 kg)	Sr	Tucker	Stone Mountain, GA
F	3	Danjel Purifoy	6 ft 7 in (2.01 m)	230 lb (104 kg)	RS Jr	Hargrave Military Academy	Centerville, AL
G/F	4	Malik Dunbar	6 ft 6 in (1.98 m)	230 lb (104 kg)	Sr	Spring Valley/College of Central Florida	North Augusta, SC
F	5	Chuma Okeke	6 ft 8 in (2.03 m)	230 lb (104 kg)	So	Westlake	Atlanta, GA
G	10	Samir Doughty	6 ft 4 in (1.93 m)	195 lb (88 kg)	RS Jr	Mathematics, Civics & Science/VCU	Philadelphia, PA
G	12	J'Von McCormick	6 ft 0 in (1.83 m)	175 lb (79 kg)	Jr	Mayde Creek/Lee College	Katy, TX
G	14	Preston Cook (W)	6 ft 4 in (1.93 m)	190 lb (86 kg)	Fr	Auburn	Auburn, AL
F	20	Myles Parker (W)	6 ft 8 in (2.03 m)	200 lb (91 kg)	Fr	Madison Academy	Madison, AL
G	21	Devontae Williams (W)	6 ft 4 in (1.93 m)	215 lb (98 kg)	Jr	Opp	Opp, AL
G	22	Will Macoy	6 ft 4 in (1.93 m)	200 lb (91 kg)	Jr	Vestavia Hills	Birmingham, AL
F	24	Anfernee McLemore	6 ft 7 in (2.01 m)	220 lb (100 kg)	Jr	Worth County	Warwick, GA
G	25	Brett Easterling (W)	6 ft 1 in (1.85 m)	170 lb (77 kg)	Jr	Lawton Chiles	Tallahassee, FL
C	41	Cole Blackstock	6 ft 9 in (2.06 m)	260 lb (118 kg)	Sr	Brooks	Killen, AL
C	50	Austin Wiley	6 ft 11 in (2.11 m)	260 lb (118 kg)	Jr	Spain Park	Hoover, AL
F	54	Thomas Collier (W)	6 ft 9 in (2.06 m)	215 lb (98 kg)	RS Jr	Briarwood Christian	Birmingham, AL
G		Jamal Johnson (I) (redshirt)	6 ft 3 in (1.91 m)	185 lb (84 kg)	RS So	Spain Park/Memphis	Birmingham, AL

Head coach

- Bruce Pearl (Boston College)

Assistant coach(es)

- Ira Bowman (Penn)
- Wes Flanigan (Auburn)
- Steven Pearl (Tennessee)

Legend

- (C) Team captain
- (S) Suspended
- (I) Ineligible
- (W) Walk-on
- Injured
- Current redshirt

Roster

== Schedule and results ==
Date time, TV	Rank^{#}	Opponent^{#}	Result	Record	High points	High rebounds	High assists	Site (attendance) city, state
Exhibition
November 2, 2018*; 7:00 pm	No. 11	Lincoln Memorial	W 76–62	–	22 – Harper	11 – Okeke	5 – Okeke	Auburn Arena (8,121); Auburn, AL
Non-conference regular season
November 6, 2018*; 8:00 pm, SECN	No. 11	South Alabama	W 101–58	1–0	20 – Tied	9 – Okeke	13 – Harper	Auburn Arena (7,754); Auburn, AL
November 9, 2018*; 8:30 pm, SECN	No. 11	No. 25 Washington	W 88–66	2–0	19 – Okeke	10 – Okeke	5 – Harper	Auburn Arena (9,121); Auburn, AL
November 14, 2018*; 7:00 pm, SECN+	No. 9	Mississippi College	W 103–52	3–0	18 – Wiley	17 – Spencer	4 – Harper	Auburn Arena (6,959); Auburn, AL
November 19, 2018*; 1:30 pm, ESPN2	No. 8	vs. Xavier; Maui Invitational tournament quarterfinals	W 88–79 ^{OT}	4–0	26 – Brown	7 – Okeke	8 – Harper	Lahaina Civic Center (2,400); Lahaina, HI
November 20, 2018*; 7:00 pm, ESPN	No. 8	vs. No. 1 Duke; Maui Invitational Tournament semifinals	L 72–78	4–1	22 – Harper	12 – McLemore	6 – Harper	Lahaina Civic Center (2,400); Lahaina, HI
November 21, 2018*; 10:30 pm, ESPN2	No. 8	vs. Arizona; Maui Invitational Tournament 3rd place game	W 73–57	5–1	19 – Brown	6 – Okeke	5 – Harper	Lahaina Civic Center (2,400); Lahaina, HI
November 28, 2018*; 7:00 pm, SECN+	No. 8	Saint Peter's	W 99–49	6–1	19 – Tied	6 – Tied	8 – Harper	Auburn Arena (7,162); Auburn, AL
December 4, 2018*; 7:00 pm, SECN	No. 8	UNC Asheville	W 67–41	7–1	14 – Wiley	7 – Tied	5 – Okeke	Auburn Arena (7,121); Auburn, AL
December 8, 2018*; 7:30 pm, SECN	No. 8	Dayton	W 82–72	8–1	34 – Brown	10 – Doughty	7 – Harper	Auburn Arena (8,365); Auburn, AL
December 15, 2018*; 6:30 pm, CBSSN	No. 8	at UAB; Rivalry/Mike Slive Invitational	W 75–71 ^{OT}	9–1	31 – Harper	6 – Tied	3 – Harper	Legacy Arena (15,856); Birmingham, AL
December 19, 2018*; 6:00 pm, ESPN2	No. 7	at NC State	L 71–78	9–2	14 – McCormick	6 – Tied	5 – Harper	PNC Arena (17,793); Raleigh, NC
December 22, 2018*; 3:30 pm, SECN	No. 7	Murray State	W 93–88	10–2	20 – Doughty	10 – Wiley	10 – Harper	Auburn Arena (8,356); Auburn, AL
December 29, 2018*; 4:00 pm, SECN+	No. 12	North Florida	W 95–49	11–2	18 – Brown	7 – Wiley	10 – Harper	Auburn Arena (8,450); Auburn, AL
SEC regular season
January 9, 2019; 6:00 pm, ESPN2	No. 11	at Ole Miss	L 67–82	11–3 (0–1)	23 – Brown	7 – Tied	5 – Harper	The Pavilion at Ole Miss (8,241); Oxford, MS
January 12, 2019; 3:00 pm, ESPN2	No. 11	Georgia	W 93–78	12–3 (1–1)	22 – Harper	6 – Spencer	7 – Harper	Auburn Arena (9,121); Auburn, AL
January 16, 2019; 6:00 pm, ESPNU	No. 14	at Texas A&M	W 85–66	13–3 (2–1)	22 – Brown	12 – Wiley	6 – Harper	Reed Arena (8,730); College Station, TX
January 19, 2019; 3:00 pm, ESPN	No. 14	No. 12 Kentucky	L 80–82	13–4 (2–2)	28 – Brown	8 – Spencer	6 – Harper	Auburn Arena (9,121); Auburn, AL
January 22, 2019; 5:30 pm, SECN	No. 16	at South Carolina	L 77–80	13–5 (2–3)	17 – Tied	7 – Okeke	5 – Harper	Colonial Life Arena (13,857); Columbia, SC
January 26, 2019; 7:30 pm, SECN	No. 16	at No. 22 Mississippi State	L 84–92	13–6 (2–4)	18 – Brown	5 – Doughty	7 – Harper	Humphrey Coliseum (10,063); Starkville, MS
January 30, 2019; 7:30 pm, SECN		Missouri	W 92–58	14–6 (3–4)	16 – Harper	12 – Okeke	5 – Harper	Auburn Arena (7,213); Auburn, AL
February 2, 2019; 7:00 pm, ESPN2		Alabama; Iron Bowl of Basketball	W 84–63	15–6 (4–4)	23 – Brown	5 – Tied	5 – Harper	Auburn Arena (9,121); Auburn, AL
February 5, 2019; 8:00 pm, ESPNU		Florida	W 76–62	16–6 (5–4)	14 – Brown	8 – Okeke	3 – Harper	Auburn Arena (7,714); Auburn, AL
February 9, 2019; 1:00 pm, ESPN2		at No. 21 LSU	L 78–83	16–7 (5–5)	25 – Harper	14 – Okeke	7 – Harper	Pete Maravich Assembly Center (12,004); Baton Rouge, LA
February 13, 2019; 7:30 pm, SECN		Ole Miss	L 55–60	16–8 (5–6)	23 – Okeke	11 – Okeke	2 – Tied	Auburn Arena (7,337); Auburn, AL
February 16, 2019; 11:00 am, ESPNU		at Vanderbilt	W 64–53	17–8 (6–6)	16 – Harper	6 – Okeke	8 – Harper	Memorial Gymnasium (11,287); Nashville, TN
February 20, 2019; 7:30 pm, SECN		Arkansas	W 79–56	18–8 (7–6)	18 – Brown	6 – McLemore	5 – Okeke	Auburn Arena (7,493); Auburn, AL
February 23, 2019; 12:30 pm, CBS		at No. 4 Kentucky	L 53–80	18–9 (7–7)	14 – Okeke	8 – McLemore	2 – Tied	Rupp Arena (23,427); Lexington, KY
February 27, 2019; 8:00 pm, ESPNU		at Georgia	W 78–75	19–9 (8–7)	22 – Harper	6 – Okeke	5 – Harper	Stegeman Coliseum (7,837); Athens, GA
March 2, 2019; 3:00 pm, ESPNU		Mississippi State	W 80–75	20–9 (9–7)	24 – Brown	7 – Okeke	9 – Harper	Auburn Arena (9,121); Auburn, AL
March 5, 2019; 8:00 pm, ESPNU		at Alabama; Iron Bowl of Basketball	W 66–60	21–9 (10–7)	17 – Okeke	14 – Okeke	3 – Okeke	Coleman Coliseum (11,865); Tuscaloosa, AL
March 9, 2019; 11:00 am, ESPN		No. 5 Tennessee	W 84–80	22–9 (11–7)	22 – Okeke	5 – Tied	8 – Harper	Auburn Arena (9,121); Auburn, AL
SEC Tournament
March 14, 2019; 2:30 pm, SECN	(5) No. 22	vs. (12) Missouri; Second Round	W 81–71	23–9	17 – Brown	10 – Spencer	5 – Harper	Bridgestone Arena (12,720); Nashville, TN
March 15, 2019; 2:30 pm, ESPN	(5) No. 22	vs. (4) South Carolina; Quarterfinals	W 73–64	24–9	27 – Harper	6 – Harper	6 – Harper	Bridgestone Arena (16,490); Nashville, TN
March 16, 2019; 12:00 pm, ESPN	(5) No. 22	vs. (8) Florida; Semifinals	W 65–62	25–9	20 – Harper	7 – Okeke	4 – Doughty	Bridgestone Arena (20,933); Nashville, TN
March 17, 2019; 12:00 pm, ESPN	(5) No. 22	vs. (3) No. 8 Tennessee; Championship	W 84–64	26–9	19 – Brown	13 – Okeke	6 – Harper	Bridgestone Arena (19,452); Nashville, TN
NCAA tournament
March 21, 2019*; 12:30 pm, TNT	(5 MW) No. 14	vs. (12 MW) New Mexico State; First Round	W 78–77	27–9	17 – Harper	5 – Okeke	5 – Brown	Vivint Smart Home Arena (16,576); Salt Lake City, UT
March 23, 2019*; 8:40 pm, TBS	(5 MW) No. 14	vs. (4 MW) No. 17 Kansas; Second Round	W 89–75	28–9	25 – Brown	5 – Okeke	6 – Harper	Vivint Smart Home Arena (17,792); Salt Lake City, UT
March 29, 2019*; 6:29 pm, TBS	(5 MW) No. 14	vs. (1 MW) No. 3 North Carolina; Sweet Sixteen	W 97–80	29–9	20 – Okeke	11 – Okeke	11 – Harper	Sprint Center (17,385); Kansas City, MO
March 31, 2019*; 1:20 pm, CBS	(5 MW) No. 14	vs. (2 MW) No. 7 Kentucky; Elite Eight	W 77–71 ^{OT}	30–9	26 – Harper	7 – Tied	5 – Harper	Sprint Center (17,174); Kansas City, MO
April 6, 2019*; 5:09 pm, CBS	(5 MW) No. 14	vs. (1 S) No. 2 Virginia; Final Four	L 62–63	30–10	13 – Doughty	12 – McLemore	3 – Tied	U.S. Bank Stadium (72,711); Minneapolis, MN
*Non-conference game. ^{#}Rankings from AP Poll. (#) Tournament seedings in parentheses. MW=Midwest S=South. All times are in Central Time.

== Rankings ==
Ranking movements Legend: ██ Increase in ranking ██ Decrease in ranking RV = Received votes т = Tied with team above or below
	Week																				
Poll	Pre	1	2	3	4	5	6	7	8	9	10	11	12	13	14	15	16	17	18	19	Final
AP	11	9	8	8	8	8	7	12	12	11	14	16	RV	RV	RV	RV	RV	RV	22	14	Not released
Coaches	12	12^	9	8	10–T	9	8	7	12	13	14	10	12	15	RV	RV	RV	RV	24	18	5

*AP does not release post-NCAA Tournament rankings
^Coaches did not release a Week 2 poll.

== Awards and honors ==
=== Bryce Brown ===
- Jerry West Award Preseason Watch List
- Preseason Media Second Team All-SEC
- Preseason Coaches' Second Team All-SEC
- Coaches' Second Team All-SEC
- SEC All-Tournament Team
- SEC Tournament MVP

=== Jared Harper ===
- Bob Cousy Award Preseason Watch List
- Preseason Media Second Team All-SEC
- Preseason Coaches' Second Team All-SEC
- Maui Jim Maui Invitational All-Tournament Team
- AP Second Team All-SEC
- Coaches' Second Team All-SEC
- SEC All-Tournament Team
- NCAA Midwest Regional All-Tournament Team
- NCAA Midwest Regional MVP

=== Chuma Okeke ===
- SEC All-Tournament Team
- NCAA Midwest Regional All-Tournament Team

=== Austin Wiley ===
- Kareem Abdul-Jabbar Award Preseason Watch List
