= 2018–19 Missouri Tigers men's basketball team =

American college basketball season

2018–19 Missouri Tigers men's basketball
- Conference: Southeastern Conference
- Record: 15–17 (5–13 SEC)
- Head coach: Cuonzo Martin (2nd season)
- Assistant coaches: Chris Hollender; Cornell Mann; Michael Porter Sr.
- Home arena: Mizzou Arena

2018–19 Southeastern Conference men's basketball standings
	Conf.				Overall
Team	W		L	PCT	W		L	PCT
No. 15 LSU	16	–	2	.889	28	–	7	.800
No. 10 Tennessee	15	–	3	.833	31	–	6	.838
No. 7 Kentucky	15	–	3	.833	30	–	7	.811
No. 5 Auburn†	11	–	7	.611	30	–	10	.750
South Carolina	11	–	7	.611	16	–	16	.500
Mississippi State	10	–	8	.556	23	–	11	.676
Ole Miss	10	–	8	.556	20	–	13	.606
Florida	9	–	9	.500	20	–	16	.556
Alabama	8	–	10	.444	18	–	16	.529
Arkansas	8	–	10	.444	18	–	16	.529
Texas A&M	6	–	12	.333	14	–	18	.438
Missouri	5	–	13	.278	15	–	17	.469
Georgia	2	–	16	.111	11	–	21	.344
Vanderbilt	0	–	18	.000	9	–	23	.281
† 2019 SEC tournament winner Rankings from AP Poll

The 2018–19 Missouri Tigers men's basketball team represented the University of Missouri in the 2018–19 NCAA Division I men's basketball season. They were led by head coach Cuonzo Martin in his second year at Missouri. The team played its home games at Mizzou Arena in Columbia, Missouri as seventh-year members of the Southeastern Conference. They finished the season 15–17 overall, 5–13 in the SEC to finish in 12th place.

== Previous season ==
The Tigers finished the 2017–18 season 20–13, 10–8 in SEC play to finish in a tie for fourth place. As the No. 5 seed in the SEC tournament, they lost to the Georgia Bulldogs in the second round. The Tigers received an at-large bid to the NCAA tournament as the No. 8 seed in the West region. The Tigers lost in the First Round to Florida State.

== Offseason ==
On March 26, 2018, Michael Porter Jr. announced he would declare for the 2018 NBA draft and would forgo his final years of eligibility by signing with an agent. On April 5, his younger brother Jontay Porter also declared for the NBA draft, but did not sign with an agent. Shortly before the deadline to withdraw from the draft, the younger Porter did so and will return for his sophomore year.

=== Departures ===
Name	Number	Pos.	Height	Weight	Year	Hometown	Notes
Michael Porter Jr.	13	F	6'10"	215	Freshman	Columbia, MO	Declared for 2018 NBA draft
Kassius Robertson	3	G	6'3"	180	RS-Senior	Toronto, ON	Graduated
Jordan Barnett	21	F	6'7"	215	Senior	St. Louis, MO	Graduated
Brett Rau	10	G	6'4"	175	Senior	Burlington, IL	Graduated
C. J. Roberts	0	G	6'0"	180	Freshman	North Richland Hills, TX	Transferred to Broward College
Terrence Phillips	1	G	5'11"	185	Junior	Orange County, CA	Left team
Blake Harris	55	G	6'3"	195	Freshman	Chapel Hill, NC	Transferred to NC State

=== Incoming transfers ===
Name	Number	Pos.	Height	Weight	Year	Hometown	Previous School
Mark Smith	13	G	6'4"	220	Freshman	Edwardsville, IL	Illinois
Dru Smith	12	G	6'3"	200	Sophomore	Evansville, IN	Evansville
K. J. Santos	2	F	6'8"	220	Sophomore	Geneva, IL	Tallahassee Community College.
Ronnie Suggs	3	G	6'6"	190	Junior	Washington, MO	Bradley University.

=== 2018 recruiting class ===
College recruiting information
Name	Hometown	School	Height	Weight	Commit date
Torrence Watson; SG	St. Louis, MO	Whitfield School	6 ft 5 in (1.96 m)	175 lb (79 kg)	Aug 9, 2017
Torrence Watson; SG	Recruit ratings: Scout: Rivals: 247Sports: ESPN: (84)				
Xavier Pinson; PG	Chicago, IL	Simeon Career Academy	6 ft 2 in (1.88 m)	170 lb (77 kg)	Feb 5, 2018
Xavier Pinson; PG	Recruit ratings: Scout: Rivals: 247Sports: ESPN: (N/A)				
Parker Braun; PF		Blue Valley Northwest	6 ft 8 in (2.03 m)	205 lb (93 kg)	May 31, 2018
Parker Braun; PF	Recruit ratings: Scout: Rivals: 247Sports: ESPN: (N/A)				
Overall recruit ranking:
Note: In many cases, Scout, Rivals, 247Sports, On3, and ESPN may conflict in their listings of height and weight.; In these cases, the average was taken. ESPN grades are on a 100-point scale.; Sources:

== Roster ==
2018–19 Missouri Tigers men's basketball team
Players
Coaches

Pos.	#	Name	Height	Weight	Year	Previous school	Hometown
G	0	Torrence Watson	6 ft 5 in (1.96 m)	200 lb (91 kg)	Fr	Whitfield School	St. Louis, MO
G	1	Xavier Pinson	6 ft 2 in (1.88 m)	170 lb (77 kg)	Fr	Simeon Career Academy	Chicago, IL
F	2	K. J. Santos	6 ft 8 in (2.03 m)	220 lb (100 kg)	So	Vermont Academy; Tallahassee Community College	Geneva, IL
G	3	Ronnie Suggs (W)	6 ft 6 in (1.98 m)	190 lb (86 kg)	Jr	Bradley University	Washington, MO
G	4	Javon Pickett	6 ft 5 in (1.96 m)	207 lb (94 kg)	Fr	Belleville East High School	Belleville, IL
F	5	Mitchell Smith	6 ft 10 in (2.08 m)	215 lb (98 kg)	So	Van Buren High School	Van Buren, AR
G	10	Evan Yerkes (W)	6 ft 3 in (1.91 m)	180 lb (82 kg)	Fr	Victor J. Andrew High School	Tinley Park, IL
F	11	Jontay Porter (injured)	6 ft 11 in (2.11 m)	240 lb (109 kg)	So	Nathan Hale High School	Columbia, MO
G	12	Dru Smith (redshirt)	6 ft 3 in (1.91 m)	200 lb (91 kg)	RS So	Reitz Memorial High School; Evansville	Evansville, IN
G	13	Mark Smith (injured)	6 ft 4 in (1.93 m)	220 lb (100 kg)	RS So	Edwardsville High School; Illinois	Edwardsville, IL
C	14	Reed Nikko	6 ft 10 in (2.08 m)	250 lb (113 kg)	Jr	Maple Grove High School	Maple Grove, MN
G	15	Jordan Geist	6 ft 2 in (1.88 m)	180 lb (82 kg)	RS Sr	Homestead High School; Ranger College	Fort Wayne, IN
C	23	Jeremiah Tilmon	6 ft 10 in (2.08 m)	252 lb (114 kg)	So	East St. Louis High School	East St. Louis, IL
F	24	Kevin Puryear	6 ft 7 in (2.01 m)	238 lb (108 kg)	Sr	Blue Springs South High School	Blue Springs, MO
G	25	Brooks Ford (W)	6 ft 0 in (1.83 m)	170 lb (77 kg)	Fr	De Smit High School	St. Louis, MO
F	32	Adam Wolf (W)	6 ft 7 in (2.01 m)	219 lb (99 kg)	Sr	Beaver Dam High School	Beaver Dam, WI
G	33	Cullen VanLeer	6 ft 4 in (1.93 m)	208 lb (94 kg)	Sr	Pacific High School	Pacific, MO
F	42	Parker Braun (W)	6 ft 8 in (2.03 m)	205 lb (93 kg)	Fr	Blue Valley Northwest High School	Overland Park, KS

Head coach

- Cuonzo Martin (Purdue)

Assistant coach(es)

- Chris Hollender (Evansville)
- Cornell Mann (Akron)
- Michael Porter Sr. (New Orleans)

Legend

- (C) Team captain
- (S) Suspended
- (I) Ineligible
- (W) Walk-on
- Injured
- Current redshirt

Roster

== Schedule and results ==
Date time, TV	Rank^{#}	Opponent^{#}	Result	Record	High points	High rebounds	High assists	Site (attendance) city, state
Non-conference regular season
November 6, 2018*; 7:00 pm, SECN+		Central Arkansas	W 68–55	1–0	19 – Ma. Smith	10 – Tied	4 – Pinson	Mizzou Arena (9,436); Columbia, MO
November 10, 2018*; 6:00 pm		at Iowa State	L 59–76	1–1	15 – Ma. Smith	7 – Tied	5 – Geist	Hilton Coliseum (14,384); Ames, IA
November 16, 2018*; 2:00 pm, FloSports		vs. Kennesaw State; Paradise Jam Quarterfinals	W 55–52	2–1	17 – Puryear	9 – Tilmon	3 – Pickett	Sports and Fitness Center (522); St. Thomas VI
November 18, 2018*; 4:30 pm, FloSports		vs. Oregon State; Paradise Jam Semifinals	W 69–63	3–1	18 – Geist	8 – Puryear	6 – Ma. Smith	Sports and Fitness Center; St. Thomas VI
November 19, 2018*; 6:30 pm, FloSports		vs. No. 12 Kansas State; Paradise Jam championship game	L 67–82	3–2	24 – Geist	4 – Tied	4 – Ma. Smith	Sports and Fitness Center (2,274); St. Thomas, VI
November 27, 2018*; 8:00 pm, SECN		Temple	L 77–79	3–3	19 – Ma. Smith	10 – Tilmon	3 – Geist	Mizzou Arena (9,971); Columbia, MO
December 2, 2018*; 2:00 pm, ESPNU		UCF	W 64–62 ^{OT}	4–3	18 – Geist	7 – Mi. Smith	3 – Pickett	Mizzou Arena (10,067); Columbia, MO
December 4, 2018*; 7:00 pm, SECN+		Texas–Arlington	W 65–45	5–3	12 – Watson	12 – Tilmon	3 – Geist	Mizzou Arena (9,428); Columbia, MO
December 7, 2018*; 6:00 pm, SECN		Oral Roberts	W 80–64	6–3	14 – Ma. Smith	6 – Tilmon	4 – Pinson	Mizzou Arena (9,813); Columbia, MO
December 18, 2018*; 6:00 pm, ESPNU		Xavier	W 71–56	7–3	23 – Tilmon	9 – Tilmon	5 – Pinson	Mizzou Arena (9,785); Columbia, MO
December 22, 2018*; 7:00 pm, BTN		vs. Illinois; Braggin' Rights	W 79–63	8–3	20 – Geist	12 – Tilmon	7 – Geist	Enterprise Center (16,397); St. Louis, MO
December 29, 2018*; 1:00 pm, SECN+		Morehead State	W 75–61	9–3	22 – Ma. Smith	8 – Puryear	3 – Tied	Mizzou Arena (11,458); Columbia, MO
SEC regular season
January 8, 2019; 6:00 pm, ESPN2		No. 3 Tennessee	L 63–87	9–4 (0–1)	14 – Pinson	5 – Tied	5 – Geist	Mizzou Arena (10,165); Columbia, MO
January 13, 2019; 12:00 pm, SECN+		at South Carolina	L 75–85	9–5 (0–2)	21 – Pickett	6 – Watson	5 – Geist	Colonial Life Arena (12,747); Columbia, SC
January 16, 2019; 8:00 pm, SECN		Alabama	L 60–70	9–6 (0–3)	13 – Tied	8 – Smith	3 – Tied	Mizzou Arena (8,530); Columbia, MO
January 19, 2019; 2:30 pm, SECN		at Texas A&M	W 66–43	10–6 (1–3)	17 – Geist	10 – Puryear	5 – Geist	Reed Arena (6,396); College Station, TX
January 23, 2019; 8:00 pm, SECN		at Arkansas	L 60–72	10–7 (1–4)	22 – Smith	7 – Smith	4 – Geist	Bud Walton Arena (13,881); Fayetteville, AR
January 26, 2019; 5:00 pm, SECN		No. 25 LSU	L 80–86 ^{OT}	10–8 (1–5)	25 – Geist	11 – Geist	2 – Tied	Mizzou Arena (11,513); Columbia, MO
January 30, 2019; 7:30 pm, SECN		at Auburn	L 58–92	10–9 (1–6)	15 – Tilmon	9 – Geist	4 – Pinson	Auburn Arena (7,213); Auburn, AL
February 2, 2019; 7:30 pm, SECN		Vanderbilt	W 77–67	11–9 (2–6)	19 – Tilmon	10 – Puryear	6 – Geist	Mizzou Arena (11,091); Columbia, MO
February 5, 2019; 8:00 pm, ESPN2		at No. 1 Tennessee	L 60–72	11–10 (2–7)	12 – Pickett	8 – Pinson	5 – Geist	Thompson–Boling Arena (17,264); Knoxville, TN
February 9, 2019; 5:00 pm, SECN		Texas A&M	L 59–68	11–11 (2–8)	15 – Pickett	7 – Puryear	6 – Pinson	Mizzou Arena (11,171); Columbia, MO
February 12, 2019; 8:00 pm, ESPNU		Arkansas	W 79–78	12–11 (3–8)	21 – Tilmon	9 – Pinson	4 – Puryear	Mizzou Arena (9,489); Columbia, MO
February 16, 2019; 2:30 pm, SECN		at Ole Miss	L 65–75	12–12 (3–9)	23 – Geist	9 – Pinson	3 – Pickett	The Pavilion at Ole Miss (8,248); Oxford, MS
February 19, 2019; 8:00 pm, ESPN		No. 4 Kentucky	L 58–66	12–13 (3–10)	13 – Suggs	7 – Tilmonn	4 – Geist	Mizzou Arena (10,703); Columbia, MO
February 23, 2019; 3:00 pm, ESPNU		at Florida	L 60–64	12–14 (3–11)	16 – Geist	6 – 2 tied	3 – Pinson	Exactech Arena (10,450); Gainesville, FL
February 26, 2019; 6:00 pm, SECN		at Mississippi State	L 49–68	12–15 (3–12)	12 – Watson	7 – Pickett	2 – 2 tied	Humphrey Coliseum (7,058); Starkville, MS
March 2, 2019; 2:30 pm, SECN		South Carolina	W 78–63	13–15 (4–12)	20 – Watson	8 – Tilmon	3 – 3 tied	Mizzou Arena (10,376); Columbia, MO
March 6, 2019; 5:30 pm, SECN		at Georgia	W 64–39	14–15 (5–12)	18 – Geist	11 – M. Smith	6 – Geist	Stegeman Coliseum; Athens, GA
March 9, 2019; 2:30 pm, SECN		Ole Miss	L 68–73	14–16 (5–13)	20 – Pinson	7 – Tilmon	6 – Pinson	Mizzou Arena (11,050); Columbia, MO
SEC Tournament
March 13, 2019; 6:00 pm, SECN	(12)	vs. (13) Georgia; First Round	W 71-61	15-16	30 – Geist	7 – Puryear	1 – 4 tied	Bridgestone Arena; Nashville, TN
March 14, 2019; 2:30 pm, SECN	(12)	vs. (5) No. 22 Auburn; Second Round	L 71–81	15–17	25 – Geist	5 – Tilmon	5 – Pinson	Bridgestone Arena; Nashville, TN
*Non-conference game. ^{#}Rankings from AP Poll. (#) Tournament seedings in parentheses. All times are in Central Time.
