= 2018–19 Arkansas Razorbacks men's basketball team =

American college basketball season

2018–19 Arkansas Razorbacks men's basketball

NIT, Second Round
- Conference: Southeastern Conference
- Record: 18–16 (8–10 SEC)
- Head coach: Mike Anderson (8th season)
- Associate head coach: Melvin Watkins
- Assistant coaches: T. J. Cleveland; Scotty Thurman
- Home arena: Bud Walton Arena

2018–19 Southeastern Conference men's basketball standings
	Conf.				Overall
Team	W		L	PCT	W		L	PCT
No. 15 LSU	16	–	2	.889	28	–	7	.800
No. 10 Tennessee	15	–	3	.833	31	–	6	.838
No. 7 Kentucky	15	–	3	.833	30	–	7	.811
No. 5 Auburn†	11	–	7	.611	30	–	10	.750
South Carolina	11	–	7	.611	16	–	16	.500
Mississippi State	10	–	8	.556	23	–	11	.676
Ole Miss	10	–	8	.556	20	–	13	.606
Florida	9	–	9	.500	20	–	16	.556
Alabama	8	–	10	.444	18	–	16	.529
Arkansas	8	–	10	.444	18	–	16	.529
Texas A&M	6	–	12	.333	14	–	18	.438
Missouri	5	–	13	.278	15	–	17	.469
Georgia	2	–	16	.111	11	–	21	.344
Vanderbilt	0	–	18	.000	9	–	23	.281
† 2019 SEC tournament winner Rankings from AP Poll

The 2018–19 Arkansas Razorbacks men's basketball team represented the University of Arkansas during the 2018–19 NCAA Division I men's basketball season. The team was led by eighth-year head coach Mike Anderson, and played their home games at Bud Walton Arena in Fayetteville, Arkansas as a member of the Southeastern Conference. They finished the season 18–16, 8–10 in SEC Play to finish a tie for 9th place. They lost in the Second Round of the SEC tournament to Florida. They received an at-large bid to the National Invitation Tournament where they defeated Providence in the First Round before losing in the Second Round to Indiana.

On March 26, 2019, Arkansas athletic director Hunter Yurachek fired Anderson.

== Previous season ==
Arkansas finished the season 23–12, 10–8 in SEC play to finish in a three-way tie for fourth place. As the No. 6 seed in the SEC tournament, the Razorbacks defeated South Carolina and Florida before losing in the semifinals to Tennessee. They received an at-large bid to the NCAA tournament where they lost in the first round to Butler.

Senior guard Jaylen Barford was named first team All-SEC, while senior guard Daryl Macon was a second team All-SEC selection. Freshman center Daniel Gafford was named to the SEC All-Freshman Team. On March 26, 2018, Gafford announced he would forgo the 2018 NBA draft, and would be returning to Arkansas for his sophomore season.

== Offseason ==
=== Departures ===
Name	Number	Pos.	Height	Weight	Year	Hometown	Notes
Jaylen Barford	0	G	6'3"	205	Senior	Jackson, Tennessee	Graduated
Trey Thompson	1	F	6'9"	265	Senior	Forrest City, Arkansas	Graduated
Daryl Macon	4	G	6'3"	185	Senior	Little Rock, Arkansas	Graduated
Arlando Cook	5	F	6'8"	215	Senior	St. Louis, Missouri	Graduated
Dustin Thomas	13	F	6'7"	220	Senior	Texarkana, Texas	Graduated
Darious Hall	20	SF	6'6"	210	Freshman	Little Rock, Arkansas	Transferred to DePaul
C.J. Jones	23	SG	6'5"	180	Sophomore	Birmingham, Alabama	Transferred to Middle Tennessee
Anton Beard	31	G	6'0"	190	Senior	North Little Rock, Arkansas	Graduated

=== 2018 recruiting class ===
College recruiting information
Name	Hometown	School	Height	Weight	Commit date
Isaiah Joe; SG	Fort Smith, AR	Northside High School	6 ft 5 in (1.96 m)	170 lb (77 kg)	Aug 2, 2016
Isaiah Joe; SG	Recruit ratings: Scout: Rivals: 247Sports: ESPN:				
Desi Sills; PG	Jonesboro, AR	Jonesboro High School	6 ft 2 in (1.88 m)	196 lb (89 kg)	Aug 19, 2016
Desi Sills; PG	Recruit ratings: Scout: Rivals: 247Sports: ESPN:				
Ethan Henderson; PF	Little Rock, AR	Parkview Magnet High School	6 ft 8 in (2.03 m)	210 lb (95 kg)	Sep 5, 2016
Ethan Henderson; PF	Recruit ratings: Scout: Rivals: 247Sports: ESPN:				
Keyshawn Embery; PG	Oklahoma City, OK	IMG Academy, FL.	6 ft 3 in (1.91 m)	202 lb (92 kg)	Sep 16, 2017
Keyshawn Embery; PG	Recruit ratings: Scout: Rivals: 247Sports: ESPN:				
Jordan Phillips; SF	Cedar Hill, TX	Cedar Hill High School	6 ft 7 in (2.01 m)	209 lb (95 kg)	Oct 8, 2017
Jordan Phillips; SF	Recruit ratings: Scout: Rivals: 247Sports: ESPN:				
Reggie Chaney; PF	Frisco, TX	Findlay Prep, Las Vegas, NV.	6 ft 8 in (2.03 m)	222 lb (101 kg)	Oct 28, 2017
Reggie Chaney; PF	Recruit ratings: Scout: Rivals: 247Sports: ESPN:				
Mason Jones; SG	Warner, OK	Connors State Jr. College	6 ft 5 in (1.96 m)	207 lb (94 kg)	Apr 7, 2018
Mason Jones; SG	Recruit ratings: Scout: Rivals: 247Sports: ESPN:				
Ibrahim Ali; C	Nigeria	Southwest Christian Academy, Little Rock, AR.	6 ft 10 in (2.08 m)	244 lb (111 kg)	May 14, 2018
Ibrahim Ali; C	Recruit ratings: Scout: Rivals: 247Sports: ESPN:				
Overall recruit ranking:
Note: In many cases, Scout, Rivals, 247Sports, On3, and ESPN may conflict in their listings of height and weight.; In these cases, the average was taken. ESPN grades are on a 100-point scale.; Sources: "2018 Arkansas Commits". Rivals.; "2018 Team Ranking". Rivals.

== Roster ==
2018–19 Arkansas Razorbacks men's basketball team
Players
Coaches

Connors State College

Pos.	#	Name	Height	Weight	Year	Previous school	Hometown
C	23	Ibrahim Ali	6 ft 10 in (2.08 m)	244 lb (111 kg)	Fr	Maumelle	Maumelle, Arkansas
SF	2	Adrio Bailey	6 ft 6 in (1.98 m)	222 lb (101 kg)	Jr	Lakeview HS	Campti, LA
PF	35	Reggie Chaney	6 ft 8 in (2.03 m)	222 lb (101 kg)	Fr	Findlay Prep	Tulsa, Oklahoma
PG	11	Keyshawn Embery	6 ft 3 in (1.91 m)	202 lb (92 kg)	Fr	Midwest City HS	Midwest City, OK
SG	3	Khalil Garland	6 ft 5 in (1.96 m)	198 lb (90 kg)	RS Fr	Parkview Arts & Science HS	Little Rock, AR
PF	10	Daniel Gafford	6 ft 11 in (2.11 m)	233 lb (106 kg)	So	El Dorado HS	El Dorado, AR
SG	5	Jalen Harris	6 ft 2 in (1.88 m)	170 lb (77 kg)	RS So	Word of God Christian Academy; New Mexico	Raleigh, NC
PF	24	Ethan Henderson	6 ft 8 in (2.03 m)	210 lb (95 kg)	Fr	Parkview Arts & Science HS	Little Rock, AR
SG	1	Isaiah Joe	6 ft 5 in (1.96 m)	170 lb (77 kg)	Fr	Northside HS	Fort Smith, AR
SG	13	Mason Jones	6 ft 5 in (1.96 m)	207 lb (94 kg)	So	Triple A Academy	DeSoto, Texas
SF	22	Gabe Osabuohien	6 ft 8 in (2.03 m)	221 lb (100 kg)	So	Southwest Christian Academy	Toronto, ON
SG	25	Jordan Phillips	6 ft 7 in (2.01 m)	209 lb (95 kg)	Fr	Cedar Hill	Fort Worth, Texas
PG	0	Desi Sills	6 ft 2 in (1.88 m)	196 lb (89 kg)	Fr	Jonesboro HS	Jonesboro, AR

Head coach

- Mike Anderson (Tulsa)

Assistant coach(es)

- Melvin Watkins (Charlotte)
- T. J. Cleveland (Arkansas)
- Scotty Thurman (Arkansas)

Legend

- (C) Team captain
- (S) Suspended
- (I) Ineligible
- (W) Walk-on
- Injured
- Current redshirt

Roster
Last update: 2018-04-21

== Schedule and results ==
Date time, TV	Rank^{#}	Opponent^{#}	Result	Record	High points	High rebounds	High assists	Site (attendance) city, state
Exhibition
October 26, 2018*; 7:00 pm		Tusculum	W 96–47	–	18 – Joe	10 – Chaney	7 – Harris	Bud Walton Arena (13,376); Fayetteville, AR
November 2, 2018*; 7:00 pm		Southwest Baptist	W 100–63	–	19 – Joe	12 – Gafford	5 – Tied	Bud Walton Arena (13,283); Fayetteville, AR
Regular season
November 9, 2018*; 6:00 pm, ESPN		vs. Texas; Armed Forces Classic	L 71–73 ^{OT}	0–1	20 – Gafford	12 – Gafford	4 – Harris	Fort Bliss (1,400); El Paso, TX
November 12, 2018*; 7:00 pm, SECN+		UC Davis; Hardwood Showcase	W 81–58	1–1	21 – Jones	8 – Jones	4 – Harris	Bud Walton Arena (13,444); Fayetteville, AR
November 18, 2018*; 2:30 pm, ESPN		Indiana; Hardwood Showcase	W 73–72	2–1	27 – Gafford	12 – Gafford	7 – Jones	Bud Walton Arena (17,456); Fayetteville, AR
November 21, 2018*; 7:00 pm, SECN+		Montana State; Hardwood Showcase	W 90–68	3–1	18 – Jones	7 – Gafford	11 – Harris	Bud Walton Arena (13,698); Fayetteville, AR
November 23, 2018*; 7:00 pm, SECN+		Texas–Arlington; Hardwood Showcase	W 78–60	4–1	21 – Gafford	8 – Chaney	6 – Harris	Bud Walton Arena (17,403); Fayetteville, AR
December 1, 2018*; 7:00 pm, SECN+		FIU	W 121–89	5–1	34 – Joe	12 – Gafford	5 – Sills	Bud Walton Arena (13,763); Fayetteville, AR
December 5, 2018*; 9:00 pm, CBSSN		at Colorado State	W 98–74	6–1	16 – Jones	9 – Gafford	12 – Harris	Moby Arena (3,238); Fort Collins, CO
December 8, 2018*; 2:30 pm, SECN		Western Kentucky	L 77–78	6–2	19 – Joe	9 – Gafford	7 – Harris	Bud Walton Arena (14,488); Fayetteville, AR
December 15, 2018*; 7:00 pm		vs. UTSA; North Little Rock Showcase	W 79–67	7–2	21 – Joe	14 – Gafford	10 – Harris	Verizon Arena (13,728); North Little Rock, AR
December 19, 2018*; 8:00 pm, SECN		Georgia Tech	L 65–69	7–3	17 – Jones	9 – Gafford	5 – Jones	Bud Walton Arena (14,368); Fayetteville, AR
December 22, 2018*; 1:00 pm, SECN		Texas State	W 73–70	8–3	21 – Jones	10 – Gafford	4 – Tied	Bud Walton Arena (13,463); Fayetteville, AR
December 28, 2018*; 7:00 pm, SECN+		Austin Peay	W 76–65	9–3	16 – Gafford	10 – Gafford	7 – Harris	Bud Walton Arena (14,267); Fayetteville, AR
January 5, 2019; 5:00 pm, SECN		at Texas A&M	W 73–71	10–3 (1–0)	15 – Harris	11 – Gafford	9 – Harris	Reed Arena (10,049); College Station, TX
January 9, 2019; 7:30 pm, SECN		Florida	L 51–57	10–4 (1–1)	30 – Jones	12 – Gafford	3 – Tied	Bud Walton Arena (17,160); Fayetteville, AR
January 12, 2019; 5:00 pm, SECN		LSU	L 88–94 ^{OT}	10–5 (1–2)	32 – Gafford	7 – Gafford	6 – Harris	Bud Walton Arena (17,361); Fayetteville, AR
January 15, 2019; 6:00 pm, ESPN2		at No. 3 Tennessee	L 87–106	10–6 (1–3)	23 – Joe	7 – Tied	6 – Jones	Thompson–Boling Arena (19,282); Knoxville, TN
January 19, 2019; 12:00 pm, SECN		at No. 18 Ole Miss	L 67–84	10–7 (1–4)	16 – Embery-Simpson	10 – Gafford	7 – Harris	The Pavilion at Ole Miss (9,500); Oxford, MS
January 23, 2019; 8:00 pm, SECN		Missouri	W 72–60	11–7 (2–4)	23 – Joe	10 – Gafford	6 – Harris	Bud Walton Arena (13,881); Fayetteville, AR
January 26, 2019*; 5:00 pm, ESPN2		at No. 14-T Texas Tech; Big 12/SEC Challenge	L 64–67	11–8	16 – Gafford	5 – Gafford	2 – Harris	United Supermarkets Arena (14,290); Lubbock, TX
January 29, 2019; 6:00 pm, ESPNU		Georgia	W 70–60	12–8 (3–4)	23 – Jones	6 – Tied	4 – Jones	Bud Walton Arena (13,970); Fayetteville, AR
February 2, 2019; 5:00 pm, SECN		at No. 19 LSU	W 90–89	13–8 (4–4)	23 – Gafford	8 – Gafford	5 – Tied	Pete Maravich Assembly Center (13,311); Baton Rouge, LA
February 5, 2019; 8:00 pm, SECN		Vanderbilt	W 69–66	14–8 (5–4)	28 – Gafford	9 – Gafford	5 – Joe	Bud Walton Arena (13,587); Fayetteville, AR
February 9, 2019; 2:30 pm, SECN		at South Carolina	L 65–77	14–9 (5–5)	17 – Harris	6 – Bailey	4 – Jones	Colonial Life Arena (12,374); Columbia, SC
February 12, 2019; 8:00 pm, ESPNU		at Missouri	L 78–79	14–10 (5–6)	26 – Gafford	8 – Gafford	5 – Harris	Mizzou Arena (9,489); Columbia, MO
February 16, 2019; 7:30 pm, SECN		Mississippi State	L 67–77	14–11 (5–7)	30 – Jones	11 – Gafford	7 – Harris	Bud Walton Arena (17,022); Fayetteville, AR
February 20, 2019; 7:30 pm, SECN		at Auburn	L 56–79	14–12 (5–8)	14 – Joe	8 – Gafford	3 – Sills	Auburn Arena (7,493); Auburn, AL
February 23, 2019; 7:30 pm, SECN		Texas A&M	L 80–87	14–13 (5–9)	23 – Gafford	13 – Gafford	4 – Jones	Bud Walton Arena (16,108); Fayetteville, AR
February 26, 2019; 8:00 pm, SECN		at No. 4 Kentucky	L 66–70	14–14 (5–10)	19 – Joe	8 – Gafford	4 – Osabuohien	Rupp Arena (21,998); Lexington, KY
March 2, 2019; 12:00 pm, SECN		Ole Miss	W 74–73	15–14 (6–10)	22 – Jones	4 – Bailey	9 – Harris	Bud Walton Arena (17,320); Fayetteville, AR
March 6, 2019; 7:30 pm, SECN		at Vanderbilt	W 84–48	16–14 (7–10)	20 – Gafford	7 – Osabuohien	5 – Jones	Memorial Gymnasium (8,517); Nashville, TN
March 9, 2019; 5:00 pm, SECN		Alabama	W 82–70	17–14 (8–10)	29 – Gafford	16 – Gafford	4 – Harris	Bud Walton Arena (16,253); Fayetteville, AR
SEC Tournament
March 14, 2019; 12:00 pm, SECN	(9)	vs. (8) Florida; Second Round	L 50–66	17–15	15 – Gafford	6 – Tied	5 – Harris	Bridgestone Arena (13,000); Nashville, TN
NIT
March 19, 2019*; 8:00 pm, ESPN2	(5)	at (4) Providence; First Round – Indiana Bracket	W 84–72	18–15	18 – Jones	8 – Osabuohien	6 – Harris	Dunkin' Donuts Center (3,057); Providence, RI
March 23, 2019*; 12:00 pm, ESPN	(5)	at (1) Indiana; Second Round – Indiana Bracket	L 60–63	18–16	18 – Sills	6 – Osabuohien	7 – Harris	Simon Skjodt Assembly Hall (12,225); Bloomington, IN
*Non-conference game. ^{#}Rankings from AP Poll. (#) Tournament seedings in parentheses. All times are in Central Time.
