= 2018–19 Georgia Bulldogs basketball team =

American college basketball season

2018–19 Georgia Bulldogs basketball
- Conference: Southeastern Conference
- Record: 11–21 (2–16 SEC)
- Head coach: Tom Crean (1st season)
- Assistant coaches: Joe Scott; Chad Dollar; Amir Abdur-Rahim
- Home arena: Stegeman Coliseum

2018–19 Southeastern Conference men's basketball standings
	Conf.				Overall
Team	W		L	PCT	W		L	PCT
No. 15 LSU	16	–	2	.889	28	–	7	.800
No. 10 Tennessee	15	–	3	.833	31	–	6	.838
No. 7 Kentucky	15	–	3	.833	30	–	7	.811
No. 5 Auburn†	11	–	7	.611	30	–	10	.750
South Carolina	11	–	7	.611	16	–	16	.500
Mississippi State	10	–	8	.556	23	–	11	.676
Ole Miss	10	–	8	.556	20	–	13	.606
Florida	9	–	9	.500	20	–	16	.556
Alabama	8	–	10	.444	18	–	16	.529
Arkansas	8	–	10	.444	18	–	16	.529
Texas A&M	6	–	12	.333	14	–	18	.438
Missouri	5	–	13	.278	15	–	17	.469
Georgia	2	–	16	.111	11	–	21	.344
Vanderbilt	0	–	18	.000	9	–	23	.281
† 2019 SEC tournament winner Rankings from AP Poll

The 2018–19 Georgia bulldogs basketball team represented the University of Georgia during the 2018–19 NCAA Division I men's basketball season. The team's head coach was Tom Crean in his first year at Georgia. They played their home games at Stegeman Coliseum in Athens, Georgia as members of the Southeastern Conference.

== Previous season ==
The Bulldogs finished the 2017–18 season 18–15, 7–11 in SEC play to finish in a tie for 11th place. As the No. 12 seed in the SEC tournament, they defeated Vanderbilt and Missouri before losing to Kentucky in the quarterfinals.

On March 10, 2018, the school fired head coach Mark Fox after nine seasons at Georgia. On March 13, the school hired former Marquette and Indiana coach Tom Crean to replace Fox.

== Offseason ==
=== Departures ===
Name	Number	Pos.	Height	Weight	Year	Hometown	Reason for departure
Yante Maten	1	F	6'8"	240	Senior	Bloomfield Hills, MI	Graduated
Juwan Parker	3	G	6'4"	205	RS Senior	Tulsa, OK	Graduated
Pape Diatta	5	F	6'7"	220	Senior	Dakar, Senegal	Graduated
Isaac Kante	30	F	6'7"	236	Freshman	Brooklyn, NY	Transferred to Hofstra

=== 2018 recruiting class ===
College recruiting information
Name	Hometown	School	Height	Weight	Commit date
Amanze Ngumezi; PF	Savannah, GA	Johnson High School	6 ft 9 in (2.06 m)	235 lb (107 kg)	Sep 3, 2017
Amanze Ngumezi; PF	Recruit ratings: Scout: Rivals: 247Sports: ESPN:				
JoJo Toppin; SF	Norcross, GA	Norcross High School	6 ft 6 in (1.98 m)	175 lb (79 kg)	Nov 15, 2017
JoJo Toppin; SF	Recruit ratings: Scout: Rivals: 247Sports: ESPN:				
Tye Fagan; PG	Thomaston, GA	Upson-Lee High School	6 ft 3 in (1.91 m)	170 lb (77 kg)	Apr 30, 2018
Tye Fagan; PG	Recruit ratings: Scout: Rivals: 247Sports: ESPN:				
Ignas Sargiūnas; SG	Kaunas, Lithuania	Jonas Basanavičius Gymnasium	6 ft 4 in (1.93 m)	195 lb (88 kg)	Jun 1, 2018
Ignas Sargiūnas; SG	Recruit ratings: Scout: Rivals: 247Sports: ESPN:				
Overall recruit ranking:
Note: In many cases, Scout, Rivals, 247Sports, On3, and ESPN may conflict in their listings of height and weight.; In these cases, the average was taken. ESPN grades are on a 100-point scale.; Sources: "2018 Georgia Basketball Commitments". Rivals.; "2018 Team Ranking". Rivals.

== Roster ==
2018–19 Georgia Bulldogs men's basketball team
Players
Coaches

Pos.	#	Name	Height	Weight	Year	Previous school	Hometown
G	0	William Jackson II	6 ft 4 in (1.93 m)	185 lb (84 kg)	Sr	Athens Christian School	Athens, GA
G	1	TeShaun Hightower	6 ft 4 in (1.93 m)	190 lb (86 kg)	So	Mount Zion Prep	Lithonia, GA
G	2	Jordan Harris	6 ft 4 in (1.93 m)	190 lb (86 kg)	Jr	Seminole County HS	Iron City, GA
G	4	Tyree Crump	6 ft 1 in (1.85 m)	185 lb (84 kg)	Jr	Bainbridge HS	Bainbridge, GA
F	5	JoJo Toppin	6 ft 6 in (1.98 m)	190 lb (86 kg)	Fr	Norcross HS	Norcross, GA
F	10	Jack Herring (W)	6 ft 8 in (2.03 m)	210 lb (95 kg)	Fr	Christian Brothers HS	Memphis, TN
G	11	Christian Harrison (W)	6 ft 4 in (1.93 m)	200 lb (91 kg)	RS Sr	Woodward Academy	Atlanta, GA
F	13	E'Torrion Wilridge	6 ft 6 in (1.98 m)	220 lb (100 kg)	Sr	Central Medical Magnet HS	Beaumont, TX
G	14	Tye Fagan	6 ft 3 in (1.91 m)	185 lb (84 kg)	Fr	Upson-Lee HS	Thomaston, GA
F	20	Rayshaun Hammonds	6 ft 8 in (2.03 m)	235 lb (107 kg)	So	Norcross HS	Norcross, GA
F	24	Connor O'Neill (W)	6 ft 6 in (1.98 m)	220 lb (100 kg)	Sr	Tilton School	Roswell, GA
F	25	Amanze Ngumezi	6 ft 9 in (2.06 m)	245 lb (111 kg)	Fr	Johnson HS	Savannah, GA
F	32	Mike Edwards	6 ft 9 in (2.06 m)	235 lb (107 kg)	Sr	John Glenn HS	Westland, MI
F	33	Nicolas Claxton	6 ft 11 in (2.11 m)	220 lb (100 kg)	So	Legacy Charter School	Greenville, SC
F	34	Derek Ogbeide	6 ft 9 in (2.06 m)	250 lb (113 kg)	Sr	Pebblebrook HS	Atlanta, GA
G	43	Ignas Sargiūnas	6 ft 5 in (1.96 m)	205 lb (93 kg)	Fr	Jonas Basanavičius Gymnasium	Kaunas, Lithuania

Head coach

- Tom Crean (Central Michigan)

Assistant coach(es)

- Joe Scott (Princeton)
- Chad Dollar (South Florida)
- Amir Abdur-Rahim (Murray State)

Legend

- (C) Team captain
- (S) Suspended
- (I) Ineligible
- (W) Walk-on
- Injured
- Current redshirt

Roster

== Schedule and results ==
Date time, TV	Rank^{#}	Opponent^{#}	Result	Record	High points	High rebounds	High assists	Site (attendance) city, state
Exhibition
October 18, 2018*; 8:00 pm		at UAB; Charity Exhibition Game	W 56–54	–	13 – Hammonds	9 – Hammonds	3 – Hightower	Bartow Arena (3,437); Birmingham, AL
November 1, 2018*; 7:00 pm, SECN+		West Georgia	W 98–59	–	18 – Crump	9 – Tied	4 – Tied	Stegeman Coliseum; Athens, GA
Regular season
November 9, 2018*; 8:30 pm, SECN+		Savannah State	W 110–76	1–0	18 – Hightower	13 – Claxton	4 – Tied	Stegeman Coliseum (9,018); Athens, GA
November 13, 2018*; 7:00 pm, ESPN3		at Temple	L 77–81	1–1	16 – Tied	11 – Ogbeide	3 – Tied	Liacouras Center; Philadelphia, PA
November 16, 2018*; 7:00 pm, SECN+		Sam Houston State	W 75–64	2–1	15 – Hammonds	8 – Claxton	4 – Wilridge	Stegeman Coliseum (7,195); Athens, GA
November 19, 2018*; 2:30 pm, Stadium		vs. Illinois State; Cayman Islands Classic Quarterfinals	W 80–68	3–1	31 – Hammonds	11 – Claxton	4 – Claxton	John Gray Gymnasium (1,180); George Town, Cayman Islands
November 20, 2018*; 2:30 pm, Stadium		vs. No. 16 Clemson; Cayman Islands Classic Semifinals	L 49–64	3–2	11 – Ogbeide	9 – Claxton	4 – Crump	John Gray Gymnasium (786); George Town, Cayman Islands
November 21, 2018*; 5:00 pm, Stadium		vs. Georgia State; Cayman Islands Classic Third Place Game	L 67–91	3–3	14 – Ogbeide	8 – Ogbeide	4 – Tied	John Gray Gymnasium (781); George Town, Cayman Islands
November 27, 2018*; 7:00 pm, SECN+		Kennesaw State	W 84–51	4–3	16 – Claxton	15 – Claxton	4 – Claxton	Stegeman Coliseum (5,947); Athens, GA
December 3, 2018*; 7:00 pm, SECN+		Texas Southern	W 92–75	5–3	25 – Crump	10 – Ogbeide	4 – Fagan	Stegeman Coliseum (6,801); Athens, GA
December 15, 2018*; 6:00 pm, SECN		No. 20 Arizona State	L 74–76	5–4	19 – Tied	13 – Claxton	3 – Claxton	Stegeman Coliseum (9,028); Athens, GA
December 18, 2018*; 7:00 pm, SECN+		Oakland	W 81–69	6–4	17 – Tied	13 – Claxton	3 – Tied	Stegeman Coliseum (7,518); Athens, GA
December 22, 2018*; 12:00 pm, ESPNU		at Georgia Tech	W 70–59	7–4	13 – Claxton	13 – Claxton	6 – Claxton	McCamish Pavilion (8,600); Atlanta, GA
December 30, 2018*; 6:00 pm, SECN		Massachusetts	W 91–72	8–4	20 – Claxton	11 – Claxton	4 – Ogbeide	Stegeman Coliseum (10,523); Athens, GA
January 5, 2019; 3:30 pm, SECN		at No. 3 Tennessee	L 50–96	8–5 (0–1)	17 – Ogbeide	6 – Ogbeide	2 – Tied	Thompson–Boling Arena (21,678); Knoxville, TN
January 9, 2019; 6:30 pm, SECN		Vanderbilt	W 82–63	9–5 (1–1)	19 – Hammonds	12 – Claxton	4 – Crump	Stegeman Coliseum (9,429); Athens, GA
January 12, 2019; 4:00 pm, ESPN2		at No. 11 Auburn	L 78–93	9–6 (1–2)	16 – Jackson II	10 – Hammonds	5 – Jackson II	Auburn Arena (9,121); Auburn, AL
January 15, 2019; 7:00 pm, ESPN		No. 12 Kentucky	L 49–69	9–7 (1–3)	12 – Claxton	9 – Claxton	2 – Tied	Stegeman Coliseum (10,523); Athens, GA
January 19, 2019; 12:00 pm, CBS		Florida	L 52–62	9–8 (1–4)	10 – Harris	12 – Claxton	2 – Tied	Stegeman Coliseum (10,023); Athens, GA
January 23, 2019; 7:00 pm, SECN		at No. 25 LSU	L 82–92	9–9 (1–5)	18 – Hammonds	9 – Claxton	3 – Tied	Pete Maravich Assembly Center (9,416); Baton Rouge, LA
January 26, 2019*; 2:00 pm, ESPN2		Texas; Big 12/SEC Challenge	W 98–88	10–9	21 – Crump	9 – Hammonds	5 – Crump	Stegeman Coliseum (10,374); Athens, GA
January 29, 2019; 7:00 pm, ESPNU		at Arkansas	L 60–70	10–10 (1–6)	14 – Tied	13 – Hammonds	3 – Wilridge	Bud Walton Arena (13,970); Fayetteville, AR
February 2, 2019; 1:00 pm, SECN		South Carolina	L 80–86	10–11 (1–7)	16 – Ogbeide	9 – Claxton	3 – Jackson II	Stegeman Coliseum (9,820); Athens, GA
February 6, 2019; 9:00 pm, SECN		at Alabama	L 74–89	10–12 (1–8)	17 – Ogbeide	9 – Claxton	2 – Tied	Coleman Coliseum (10,541); Tuscaloosa, AL
February 9, 2019; 1:00 pm, SECN		Ole Miss	L 64–80	10–13 (1–9)	10 – Tied	11 – Harris	2 – Tied	Stegeman Coluiseum (10,033); Athens, GA
February 12, 2019; 7:00 pm, SECN		at Texas A&M	L 56–73	10–14 (1–10)	18 – Claxton	10 – Claxton	3 – Tied	Reed Arena (5,782); College Station, TX
February 16, 2019; 6:00 pm, SECN		No. 19 LSU	L 79–83	10–15 (1–11)	17 – Claxton	7 – Harris	4 – Claxton	Stegeman Coliseum (10,298); Athens, GA
February 20, 2019; 6:30 pm, SECN		Mississippi State	L 67–68	10–16 (1–12)	13 – Harris	10 – Hammonds	4 – Tied	Stegeman Coliseum (7,153); Athens, GA
February 23, 2019; 3:30 pm, SECN		at Ole Miss	L 71–72	10–17 (1–13)	16 – Hammonds	7 – Ogbeide	6 – Jackson II	The Pavilion at Ole Miss (7,416); Oxford, MS
February 27, 2019; 9:00 pm, ESPNU		Auburn	L 75–78	10–18 (1–14)	18 – Harris	7 – Claxton	5 – Jackson II	Stegeman Coliseum (7,837); Athens, GA
March 2, 2019; 8:30 pm, SECN		at Florida	W 61–55	11–18 (2–14)	25 – Claxton	5 – Tied	4 – Harris	O'Connell Center (9,328); Gainesville, FL
March 6, 2019; 6:30 pm, SECN		Missouri	L 39–64	11–19 (2–15)	9 – Claxton	10 – Claxton	3 – Wilridge	Stegeman Coliseum (7,180); Athens, GA
March 9, 2019; 1:00 pm, SECN		at South Carolina	L 46–66	11–20 (2–16)	13 – Claxton	10 – Tied	4 – Jackson II	Colonial Life Arena; Columbia, SC
SEC Tournament
March 13, 2019; 6:00 pm, SECN	(13)	vs. (12) Missouri; First Round	L 61–71	11–21	26 – Harris	8 – Ogbeide	5 – Jackson II	Bridgestone Arena; Nashville, TN
*Non-conference game. ^{#}Rankings from AP Poll. (#) Tournament seedings in parentheses. All times are in Eastern Time.
