= 2018–19 Vanderbilt Commodores men's basketball team =

American college basketball season

2018–19 Vanderbilt Commodores men's basketball
- Conference: Southeastern Conference
- Record: 9–23 (0–18 SEC)
- Head coach: Bryce Drew (3rd season)
- Assistant coaches: Roger Powell Jr.; Jake Diebler; Casey Shaw
- Home arena: Memorial Gymnasium

2018–19 Southeastern Conference men's basketball standings
	Conf.				Overall
Team	W		L	PCT	W		L	PCT
No. 15 LSU	16	–	2	.889	28	–	7	.800
No. 10 Tennessee	15	–	3	.833	31	–	6	.838
No. 7 Kentucky	15	–	3	.833	30	–	7	.811
No. 5 Auburn†	11	–	7	.611	30	–	10	.750
South Carolina	11	–	7	.611	16	–	16	.500
Mississippi State	10	–	8	.556	23	–	11	.676
Ole Miss	10	–	8	.556	20	–	13	.606
Florida	9	–	9	.500	20	–	16	.556
Alabama	8	–	10	.444	18	–	16	.529
Arkansas	8	–	10	.444	18	–	16	.529
Texas A&M	6	–	12	.333	14	–	18	.438
Missouri	5	–	13	.278	15	–	17	.469
Georgia	2	–	16	.111	11	–	21	.344
Vanderbilt	0	–	18	.000	9	–	23	.281
† 2019 SEC tournament winner Rankings from AP Poll

The 2018–19 Vanderbilt Commodores men's basketball team represented Vanderbilt University in the 2018–19 NCAA Division I men's basketball season. They were coached by Bryce Drew in his third season at Vanderbilt. The Commodores played their home games at Memorial Gymnasium in Nashville, Tennessee as members of the Southeastern Conference. They finished the season 9–23, 0–18 to finish in last place in SEC play. They were the first SEC team to go winless in a season since the 1954 Georgia Tech team, and the first team ever in the 18-game conference schedule. They lost in the first round of the SEC tournament to Texas A&M.

On March 22, 2019, the school fired Drew as head coach after three years in Nashville. On April 5, the school hired former NBA player and NBA assistant coach Jerry Stackhouse as head coach.

== Previous season ==
They finished the season 12–20, 6–12 in SEC play to finish in 13th place. They lost in the first round of the SEC tournament to Georgia.

== Offseason ==
=== Departures ===
Name	Number	Pos.	Height	Weight	Year	Hometown	Reason for departure
Larry Austin Jr.	3	G	6'2"	182	RS Junior	Springfield, IL	Transferred to Central Michigan
Djery Baptiste	12	C	6'10"	235	RS Sophomore	Gonaïves, Haiti	Transferred to Massachusetts
Matthew Fisher-Davis	5	G/F	6'5"	186	Senior	Charlotte, NC	Graduated
Riley LaChance	13	G	6'2"	185	Senior	Brookfield, WI	Graduated
Jeff Roberson	11	F	6'6"	220	Senior	Houston, TX	Graduated
Payton Willis	1	G	6'4"	182	Sophomore	Fayetteville, AR	Transferred to University of Minnesota

=== Incoming transfers ===
Name	Number	Pos.	Height	Weight	Year	Hometown	Previous School
Matthew Moyer	13	F	6'8"	220	Junior	Gahanna, OH	Syracuse University

=== 2018 recruiting class ===
College recruiting information
Name	Hometown	School	Height	Weight	Commit date
Aaron Nesmith; SF	Charleston, SC	Porter-Gaud School	6 ft 5 in (1.96 m)	190 lb (86 kg)	Sep 19, 2017
Aaron Nesmith; SF	Recruit ratings: Scout: Rivals: 247Sports: ESPN:				
Darius Garland; PG	Nashville, TN	Brentwood Academy	6 ft 1 in (1.85 m)	170 lb (77 kg)	Nov 13, 2017
Darius Garland; PG	Recruit ratings: Scout: Rivals: 247Sports: ESPN:				
Simisola Shittu; PF	Burlington, ON	Vermont Academy	6 ft 9 in (2.06 m)	220 lb (100 kg)	Nov 22, 2017
Simisola Shittu; PF	Recruit ratings: Scout: Rivals: 247Sports: ESPN:				
Overall recruit ranking: Scout: 12 Rivals: 12
Note: In many cases, Scout, Rivals, 247Sports, On3, and ESPN may conflict in their listings of height and weight.; In these cases, the average was taken. ESPN grades are on a 100-point scale.; Sources: "Vanderbilt 2018 Basketball Commitments". Rivals.; "ESPN". ESPN.; "2018 Team Ranking". Rivals.

== Roster ==
2018–19 Vanderbilt Commodores men's basketball team
Players
Coaches

Pos.	#	Name	Height	Weight	Year	Previous school	Hometown
G	0	Saben Lee	6 ft 2 in (1.88 m)	183 lb (83 kg)	So	Corona del Sol High School	Phoenix, Arizona
G/F	2	Joe Toye	6 ft 7 in (2.01 m)	210 lb (95 kg)	Sr	Whitney M. Young Magnet High School	Chicago, Illinois
G	3	Maxwell Evans	6 ft 2 in (1.88 m)	192 lb (87 kg)	So	Bellaire High School	Houston, Texas
F/C	4	Yanni Wetzell	6 ft 10 in (2.08 m)	240 lb (109 kg)	RS Jr	St. Mary's	Auckland, New Zealand
G	10	Darius Garland	6 ft 2 in (1.88 m)	175 lb (79 kg)	Fr	Brentwood Academy	Nashville, Tennessee
F/C	11	Simisola Shittu	6 ft 10 in (2.08 m)	240 lb (109 kg)	Fr	Vermont Academy	Burlington, Ontario
F	13	Matthew Moyer	6 ft 8 in (2.03 m)	217 lb (98 kg)	Jr	Syracuse	Gahanna, Ohio
G	14	Isaiah Rice	5 ft 11 in (1.8 m)	195 lb (88 kg)	So	Park Tudor School	Indianapolis, Indiana
F	15	Clevon Brown	6 ft 8 in (2.03 m)	240 lb (109 kg)	Jr	Winston Churchill High School	San Antonio, Texas
F	24	Aaron Nesmith	6 ft 6 in (1.98 m)	213 lb (97 kg)	Fr	Porter-Gaud School	Charleston, South Carolina
F	32	Matt Ryan	6 ft 8 in (2.03 m)	209 lb (95 kg)	RS Jr	Notre Dame	Cortlandt Manor, New York
G	42	Mac Hunt (W)	6 ft 6 in (1.98 m)	182 lb (83 kg)	Fr	McCallie School	Chattanooga, Tennessee
F/C	50	Ejike Obinna (redshirt)	6 ft 10 in (2.08 m)	234 lb (106 kg)	So	Virginia Academy (VA)	Enugu, Nigeria

Head coach

- Bryce Drew (Valparaiso)

Assistant coach(es)

- Roger Powell Jr. (Illinois)
- Jake Diebler (Valparaiso)
- Casey Shaw (Toledo)

Legend

- (C) Team captain
- (S) Suspended
- (I) Ineligible
- (W) Walk-on
- Injured
- Current redshirt

Roster

== Schedule ==
Date time, TV	Rank^{#}	Opponent^{#}	Result	Record	Site city, state
Regular season
November 6, 2018*; 8:30 pm, SECN+		Winthrop	W 92–79	1–0	Memorial Gymnasium (8,387); Nashville, TN
November 11, 2018*; 8:00 pm, P12N		at USC	W 82–78	2–0	Galen Center (3,804); Los Angeles, CA
November 16, 2018*; 7:00 pm, SECN+		Alcorn State	W 79–54	3–0	Memorial Gymnasium (9,193); Nashville, TN
November 19, 2018*; 7:00 pm, SECN+		Liberty	W 79–70	4–0	Memorial Gymnasium (8,493); Nashville, TN
November 23, 2018*; 4:00 pm, SECN+		Kent State	L 75–77	4–1	Memorial Gymnasium (9,061); Nashville, TN
November 27, 2018*; 7:00 pm, SECN+		Savannah State	W 120–85	5–1	Memorial Gymnasium (8,271); Nashville, TN
December 1, 2018*; 5:00 pm, ESPN2		vs. NC State; Hoophall Miami Invitational	L 65–80	5–2	American Airlines Arena; Miami, FL
December 5, 2018*; 6:30 pm, SECN		Middle Tennessee	W 79–51	6–2	Memorial Gymnasium (8,513); Nashville, TN
December 17, 2018*; 6:00 pm, SECN		No. 18 Arizona State	W 81–65	7–2	Memorial Gymnasium (9,271); Nashville, TN
December 22, 2018*; 6:30 pm, ESPN2		vs. Kansas State; Wildcat Showcase	L 58–69	7–3	Sprint Center (14,062); Kansas City, MO
December 29, 2018*; 12:30 pm, SECN+		Tennessee State	W 95–76	8–3	Memorial Gymnasium (9,505); Nashville, TN
December 31, 2018*; 1:00 pm, SECN+		UNC Asheville	W 90–59	9–3	Memorial Gymnasium (8,350); Nashville, TN
January 5, 2019; 7:30 pm, SECN		Ole Miss	L 71–81	9–4 (0–1)	Memorial Gymnasium (10,422); Nashville, TN
January 9, 2019; 5:30 pm, SECN		at Georgia	L 63–82	9–5 (0–2)	Stegeman Coliseum (9,429); Athens, GA
January 12, 2019; 7:30 pm, SECN		at No. 18 Kentucky	L 47–56	9–6 (0–3)	Rupp Arena (22,504); Lexington, KY
January 16, 2019; 6:30 pm, SECN		South Carolina	L 71–74	9–7 (0–4)	Memorial Gymnasium (8,400); Nashville, TN
January 19, 2019; 7:30 pm, SECN		No. 24 Mississippi State	L 55–71	9–8 (0–5)	Memorial Gymnasium (9,570); Nashville, TN
January 23, 2019; 6:00 pm, ESPN2		No. 1 Tennessee	L 83–88 ^{OT}	9–9 (0–6)	Memorial Gymnasium (14,316); Nashville, TN
January 26, 2019*; 3:00 pm, ESPN2		at Oklahoma; Big 12/SEC Challenge	L 55–86	9–10	Lloyd Noble Center (8,848); Norman, OK
January 29, 2019; 8:00 pm, ESPN		No. 7 Kentucky	L 52–87	9–11 (0–7)	Memorial Gymnasium (12,298); Nashville, TN
February 2, 2019; 7:30 pm, SECN		at Missouri	L 67–77	9–12 (0–8)	Mizzou Arena (11,091); Columbia, MO
February 5, 2019; 8:00 pm, SECN		at Arkansas	L 66–69	9–13 (0–9)	Bud Walton Arena (13,587); Fayetteville, AR
February 9, 2019; 7:30 pm, SECN		Alabama	L 67–77	9–14 (0–10)	Memorial Gymnasium (10,539); Nashville, TN
February 13, 2019; 8:00 pm, ESPNU		at Florida	L 57–66	9–15 (0–11)	O'Connell Center; Gainesville, FL
February 16, 2019; 11:00 am, ESPNU		Auburn	L 53–64	9–16 (0–12)	Memorial Gymnasium (11,287); Nashville, TN
February 19, 2019; 6:00 pm, ESPN		at No. 5 Tennessee	L 46–58	9–17 (0–13)	Thompson-Boling Arena (20,523); Knoxville, TN
February 23, 2019; 5:00 pm, ESPNU		at Alabama	L 61–68	9–18 (0–14)	Coleman Coliseum (11,020); Tuscaloosa, AL
February 27, 2019; 8:00 pm, SECN		Florida	L 55–71	9–19 (0–15)	Memorial Gymnasium (8,583); Nashville, TN
March 2, 2019; 5:00 pm, SECN		at Texas A&M	L 57–64	9–20 (0–16)	Reed Arena (7,679); College Station, TX
March 6, 2019; 7:30 pm, SECN		Arkansas	L 48–84	9–21 (0–17)	Memorial Gymnasium (8,517); Nashville, TN
March 9, 2019; 7:30 pm, SECN		at No. 10 LSU	L 59–80	9–22 (0–18)	Pete Maravich Assembly Center (13,546); Baton Rouge, LA
SEC tournament
March 13, 2019; 8:30 pm, SECN	(14)	vs. (11) Texas A&M; First Round	L 52–69	9–23	Bridgestone Arena (10,849); Nashville, TN
*Non-conference game. ^{#}Rankings from AP Poll. (#) Tournament seedings in parentheses. All times are in Central Time.

== See also ==
- 2018–19 Vanderbilt Commodores women's basketball team
