= Xavier Pinson =

American basketball player (born 2000)

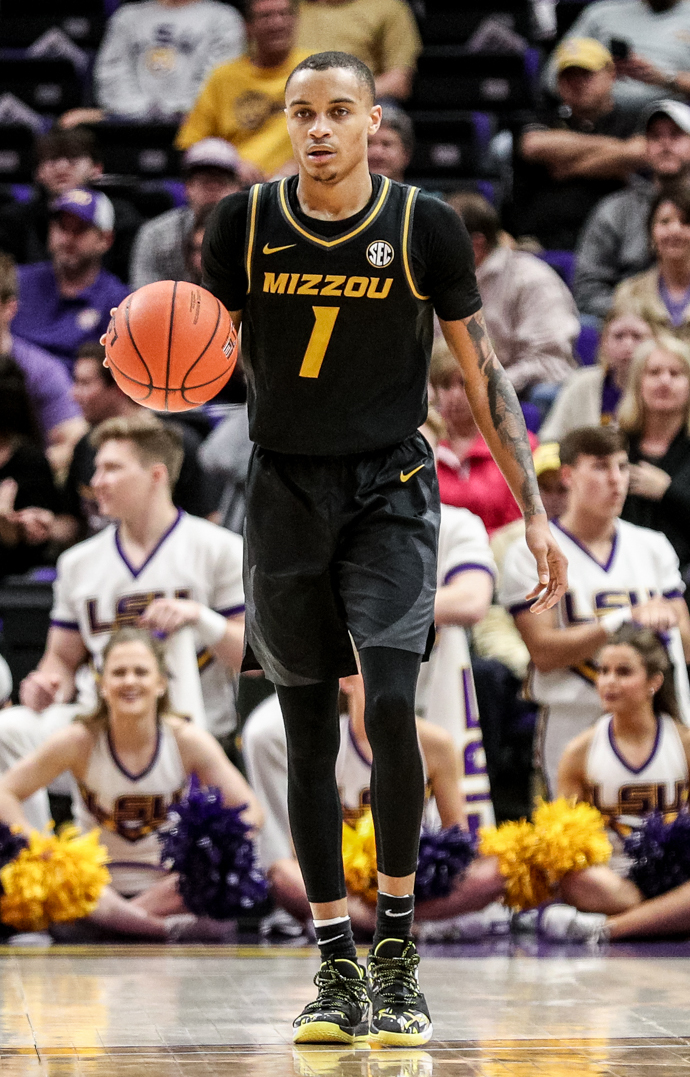
- Pinson with Missouri in 2020

No. 11 – Ostioneros de Guaymas
- Position: Point guard
- League: CIBACOPA

Personal information
- Born: June 23, 2000 (age 26) Chicago, Illinois
- Listed height: 6 ft 4 in (1.93 m)
- Listed weight: 182 lb (83 kg)

Career information
- High school: St. Patrick (Chicago, Illinois); Simeon Career Academy (Chicago, Illinois)
- College: Missouri (2018–2021); LSU (2021–2022); New Mexico State (2022–2023)
- NBA draft: 2023: undrafted
- Playing career: 2023–present

Career history
- 2023: Montreal Alliance
- 2023: Leicester Riders
- 2024: Rip City Remix
- 2024: Raptors 905
- 2024: Salt Lake City Stars
- 2025: Osceola Magic
- 2026–present: Ostioneros de Guaymas

Xavier Pinson (born June 23, 2000) is an American professional basketball player for the Ostioneros de Guaymas of the Circuito de Baloncesto de la Costa del Pacífico (CIBACOPA). He played college basketball for the Missouri Tigers, LSU Tigers and New Mexico State Aggies.

== High school career ==
Pinson attended St. Patrick High School in Chicago, Illinois. He stood 5'1" as a freshman and made the varsity team in his following year. He transferred to Simeon Career Academy in Chicago, Illinois for his senior season, joining Talen Horton-Tucker. Pinson averaged 11.9 points and 3.8 assists per game, helping his team win Class 4A sectional and Chicago Public League titles. He originally committed to playing college basketball for Kent State before reopening his recruitment. A three-star recruit, Pinson committed to Missouri over offers from Georgetown and Wisconsin.

== College career ==
As a freshman at Missouri, Pinson averaged 6.6 points, 2.6 rebounds and 2.3 assists per game. On February 18, 2020, he scored a sophomore season-high 32 points in a 71–68 win over Ole Miss. Pinson became one of his team's best offensive players during the month. As a sophomore, he averaged 11.1 points, 2.8 rebounds and 2.8 assists per game. He declared for the 2020 NBA draft before withdrawing his name and returning to college. On January 23, 2021, Pinson scored 27 points in a 73–64 victory over sixth-ranked Tennessee. One week later, he scored 36 points in a 102–98 overtime win over TCU. As a junior, Pinson averaged 13.6 points and 2.9 assists per game. For his senior season, he transferred to LSU.

== Professional career ==
=== Montreal Alliance (2023) ===
After going undrafted in the 2023 NBA draft, Pinson signed with the Montreal Alliance of the Canadian Elite Basketball League on July 15, 2023.

=== Leicester Riders (2023) ===
On August 7, 2023, Pinson signed with Leicester Riders of the British Basketball League.

=== Rip City Remix (2024) ===
On February 10, 2024, Pinson joined the Rip City Remix of the NBA G League. However, he was waived nine days later.

=== Raptors 905 (2024) ===
On February 22, 2024, Pinson joined Raptors 905, but was waived on March 14.

=== Salt Lake City Stars (2024) ===
On March 22, 2024, Pinson joined the Salt Lake City Stars.

On October 25, 2024, Pinson was traded to the Wisconsin Herd, but was waived on November 7. Four days later, he signed with the Osceola Magic, but was waived on November 26 before playing for the Magic.

== Career statistics ==
Legend
GP	Games played	GS	Games started	MPG	Minutes per game
FG%	Field goal percentage	3P%	3-point field goal percentage	FT%	Free throw percentage
RPG	Rebounds per game	APG	Assists per game	SPG	Steals per game
BPG	Blocks per game	PPG	Points per game	**Bold**	Career high

=== College ===
Year	Team	GP	GS	MPG	FG%	3P%	FT%	RPG	APG	SPG	BPG	PPG
2018–19	Missouri	**31**	12	18.4	**.412**	**.400**	.779	2.6	2.3	.6	.0	6.6
2019–20	Missouri	**31**	11	24.0	.391	.279	.817	**2.8**	2.8	.8	.0	11.1
2020–21	Missouri	26	**26**	**25.6**	.386	.336	**.837**	2.7	**2.9**	**1.1**	.0	**13.6**
Career		88	49	22.5	.394	.330	.815	2.7	2.6	.8	.0	10.3
