= 2018–19 South Carolina Gamecocks men's basketball team =

American college basketball season

2018–19 South Carolina Gamecocks men's basketball
- Conference: Southeastern Conference
- Record: 16–16 (11–7 SEC)
- Head coach: Frank Martin (7th season)
- Assistant coaches: Perry Clark; Chuck Martin; Bruce Shingler
- Home arena: Colonial Life Arena

2018–19 Southeastern Conference men's basketball standings
| | Conf. | | | | Overall |
| Team | W | | L | PCT | W | | L | PCT |
|---|---|---|---|---|---|---|---|---|
| No. 15 LSU | 16 | – | 2 | .889 | 28 | – | 7 | .800 |
| No. 10 Tennessee | 15 | – | 3 | .833 | 31 | – | 6 | .838 |
| No. 7 Kentucky | 15 | – | 3 | .833 | 30 | – | 7 | .811 |
| No. 5 Auburn† | 11 | – | 7 | .611 | 30 | – | 10 | .750 |
| South Carolina | 11 | – | 7 | .611 | 16 | – | 16 | .500 |
| Mississippi State | 10 | – | 8 | .556 | 23 | – | 11 | .676 |
| Ole Miss | 10 | – | 8 | .556 | 20 | – | 13 | .606 |
| Florida | 9 | – | 9 | .500 | 20 | – | 16 | .556 |
| Alabama | 8 | – | 10 | .444 | 18 | – | 16 | .529 |
| Arkansas | 8 | – | 10 | .444 | 18 | – | 16 | .529 |
| Texas A&M | 6 | – | 12 | .333 | 14 | – | 18 | .438 |
| Missouri | 5 | – | 13 | .278 | 15 | – | 17 | .469 |
| Georgia | 2 | – | 16 | .111 | 11 | – | 21 | .344 |
| Vanderbilt | 0 | – | 18 | .000 | 9 | – | 23 | .281 |
† 2019 SEC tournament winner Rankings from AP Poll

The 2018–19 South Carolina Gamecocks men's basketball team represented the University of South Carolina during the 2018–19 NCAA Division I men's basketball season. The team's head coach, Frank Martin, was in his seventh season at South Carolina. The team played its home games at Colonial Life Arena in Columbia, South Carolina as a member of the Southeastern Conference. They finished the season 16-16, 11-7 in SEC Play to finish a tie for 4th place. They lost in the quarterfinals of the SEC tournament to Auburn.

== Previous season ==
The Gamecocks finished the 2017–18 season finished the season 17–16, 7–11 in SEC play to finish in a tie for 11th place. They had 3 wins against ranked teams; No. 10 Auburn, No. 18 Kentucky, and No. 20 Florida. They defeated Ole Miss in the first round of the SEC tournament before losing in the second round to Arkansas.

== Offseason ==
=== Departures ===
| Name | Number | Pos. | Height | Weight | Year | Hometown | Reason for departure |
|---|---|---|---|---|---|---|---|
| David Beatty | 0 | G | 6'2" | 205 | Freshman | Philadelphia, PA | Transferred to La Salle |
| Kory Holden | 1 | G | 6'1" | 197 | RS Junior | Salisbury, MD | Transferred to South Alabama |
| Frank Booker Jr. | 5 | G | 6'3" | 208 | RS Senior | Augusta, GA | Graduated |
| Khadim Gueye | 12 | F | 7'0" | 248 | Sophomore | Dakar, Senegal | Transferred to Akron |
| Ibrahim Doumbia | 14 | F | 6'6" | 205 | Freshman | Miami, FL | Transferred to UCF |
| Wesley Myers | 15 | G | 6'1" | 193 | RS Senior | Brooklyn, NY | Graduated |
| Tommy Corchiani | 20 | G | 6'3" | 180 | Sophomore | Raleigh, NC | Left team |
| Christian Schmitt | 25 | G | 5'11" | 180 | Sophomore | Mars, PA | Left team |

=== Incoming transfers ===
| Name | Number | Pos. | Height | Weight | Year | Hometown | Previous School |
|---|---|---|---|---|---|---|---|
| Tre Campbell | 4 | G | 6'2" | 170 | Graduate Student | Washington, D.C. | Georgetown |
| Jair Bolden | 52 | G | 6'4' | 205 | Junior | Brooklyn, NY | George Washington |

=== 2018 recruiting class ===
College recruiting information
| Name | Hometown | School | Height | Weight | Commit date |
|---|---|---|---|---|---|
| T.J. Moss #30 SG | Memphis, TN | Findlay Prep | 6 ft 4 in (1.93 m) | 175 lb (79 kg) | Apr 15, 2018 |
| T.J. Moss #30 SG | Recruit ratings: Scout: Rivals: 247Sports: ESPN: | | | | |
| Keyshawn Bryant #42 SF | Winter Haven, FL | Huntington Prep | 6 ft 6 in (1.98 m) | 180 lb (82 kg) | Jun 2, 2018 |
| Keyshawn Bryant #42 SF | Recruit ratings: Scout: Rivals: 247Sports: ESPN: | | | | |
| A. J. Lawson; SG | Brampton, ON | Montverde Academy | 6 ft 6 in (1.98 m) | 185 lb (84 kg) | Jan 26, 2018 |
| A. J. Lawson; SG | Recruit ratings: Scout: Rivals: 247Sports: ESPN: | | | | |
| Jermaine Couisnard; SG | East Chicago, IN | Montverde Academy | 6 ft 4 in (1.93 m) | 185 lb (84 kg) | Jan 27, 2018 |
| Jermaine Couisnard; SG | Recruit ratings: Scout: Rivals: 247Sports: ESPN: | | | | |
| Alanzo Frink; PF | Roselle, NJ | Roselle Catholic High School | 6 ft 8 in (2.03 m) | 215 lb (98 kg) | Apr 3, 2018 |
| Alanzo Frink; PF | Recruit ratings: Scout: Rivals: 247Sports: ESPN: | | | | |
Overall recruit ranking:
Note: In many cases, Scout, Rivals, 247Sports, On3, and ESPN may conflict in their listings of height and weight.; In these cases, the average was taken. ESPN grades are on a 100-point scale.; Sources: "South Carolina 2018 Basketball Commitments". Rivals.; "2018 Team Ranking". Rivals.

== Roster ==
2018–19 South Carolina Gamecocks men's basketball team
Players
Coaches

| Pos. | # | Name | Height | Weight | Year | Previous school | Hometown |
|---|---|---|---|---|---|---|---|
| G | 00 | A. J. Lawson | 6 ft 6 in (1.98 m) | 172 lb (78 kg) | Fr | GTA Prep | Mississauga, ON |
| G | 1 | T. J. Moss | 6 ft 4 in (1.93 m) | 193 lb (88 kg) | Fr | Findlay Prep | Memphis, TN |
| G | 2 | Hassani Gravett | 6 ft 1 in (1.85 m) | 188 lb (85 kg) | RS Sr | Alexander; Pensacola State College | Villa Rica, GA |
| G | 4 | Tre Campbell | 6 ft 2 in (1.88 m) | 183 lb (83 kg) | GS | St. John's College HS; Georgetown | Washington, D.C. |
| G | 5 | Jermaine Couisnard (redshirt) | 6 ft 4 in (1.93 m) | 202 lb (92 kg) | Fr | Montverde Academy | East Chicago, IN |
| F | 10 | Justin Minaya | 6 ft 5 in (1.96 m) | 215 lb (98 kg) | So | Northern Valley Regional HS | Old Tappan, NJ |
| F | 13 | Felipe Haase | 6 ft 9 in (2.06 m) | 253 lb (115 kg) | So | Miami Christian School | Osorno, Chile |
| F | 14 | Nathan Nelson (W) | 6 ft 6 in (1.98 m) | 174 lb (79 kg) | Fr | Blackman HS | Murfreesboro, TN |
| F | 20 | Alanzo Frink | 6 ft 8 in (2.03 m) | 265 lb (120 kg) | Fr | Roselle Catholic HS | Jersey City, NJ |
| F | 21 | Maik Kotsar | 6 ft 10 in (2.08 m) | 264 lb (120 kg) | Jr | Sunrise Christian Academy | Tallinn, Estonia |
| G | 23 | Evan Hinson | 6 ft 4 in (1.93 m) | 240 lb (109 kg) | Jr | Deltona HS | Deltona, FL |
| F | 24 | Keyshawn Bryant | 6 ft 6 in (1.98 m) | 190 lb (86 kg) | Fr | Winter Haven HS | Winter Haven, FL |
| F | 30 | Chris Silva | 6 ft 9 in (2.06 m) | 234 lb (106 kg) | Sr | Roselle Catholic HS | Libreville, Gabon |
| F | 33 | Jason Cudd | 7 ft 1 in (2.16 m) | 263 lb (119 kg) | So | Socastee HS | Myrtle Beach, SC |
| G | 52 | Jair Bolden (redshirt) | 6 ft 4 in (1.93 m) | 210 lb (95 kg) | Jr | Westtown School; George Washington | Brooklyn, NY |

Head coach

- Frank Martin (FIU)

Assistant coach(es)

- Perry Clark (Gettysburg)
- Bruce Shingler (St. Augustine's)
- Chuck Martin (Monmouth)

Legend

- (C) Team captain
- (S) Suspended
- (I) Ineligible
- (W) Walk-on
- Injured
- Current redshirt

Roster

== Schedule and results ==
| Date time, TV | Rank^{#} | Opponent^{#} | Result | Record | High points | High rebounds | High assists | Site (attendance) city, state |
Exhibition
| October 26, 2018*; 6:00 pm | | Augusta | L 72–77 | – | 18 – Gravett | 10 – Minaya | 3 – Tied | Colonial Life Arena; Columbia, SC |
Regular season
| November 6, 2018*; 7:00 pm, SECN+ | | USC Upstate | W 65–52 | 1–0 | 21 – Bryant | 12 – Gravett | 3 – Gravett | Colonial Life Arena (10,145); Columbia, SC |
| November 9, 2018*; 7:00 pm, SECN+ | | Stony Brook; Hall of Fame Tip Off campus-site game | L 81–83 | 1–1 | 23 – Lawson | 9 – Tied | 6 – Lawson | Colonial Life Arena (9,657); Columbia, SC |
| November 13, 2018*; 7:00 pm, SECN+ | | Norfolk State; Hall of Fame Tip Off campus-site game | W 81–64 | 2–1 | 18 – Tied | 6 – Lawson | 8 – Lawson | Colonial Life Arena (9,038); Columbia, SC |
| November 17, 2018*; 2:30 pm, ESPN3 | | vs. Providence; Hall of Fame Tip Off Naismith semifinals | L 67–76 | 2–2 | 14 – Gravett | 7 – Gravett | 3 – Lawson | Mohegan Sun Arena; Uncasville, CT |
| November 18, 2018*; 4:00 pm, ESPN2 | | vs. George Washington; Hall of Fame Tip Off Naismith 3rd place game | W 90–55 | 3–2 | 20 – Silva | 10 – Silva | 5 – Lawson | Mohegan Sun Arena; Uncasville, CT |
| November 26, 2018*; 7:00 pm, SECN+ | | Wofford | L 61–81 | 3–3 | 13 – Tied | 10 – Kotsar | 3 – Moss | Colonial Life Arena (10,561); Columbia, SC |
| November 30, 2018*; 7:00 pm, SECN | | Coastal Carolina | W 85–79 | 4–3 | 25 – Lawson | 8 – Kotsar | 4 – Gravett | Colonial Life Arena (9,315); Columbia, SC |
| December 5, 2018*; 9:00 pm, Stadium | | at Wyoming | L 64–73 | 4–4 | 15 – Lawson | 9 – Lawson | 4 – Moss | Arena-Auditorium (3,657); Laramie, WY |
| December 8, 2018*; 12:00 pm, FS1 | | at No. 5 Michigan | L 78–89 | 4–5 | 18 – Silva | 12 – Silva | 5 – Lawson | Crisler Center (12,707); Ann Arbor, MI |
| December 19, 2018*; 7:00 pm, SECN | | No. 5 Virginia | L 52–69 | 4–6 | 11 – Silva | 8 – Frink | 3 – Lawson | Colonial Life Arena (12,291); Columbia, SC |
| December 22, 2018*; 2:00 pm, ESPN2 | | Clemson; Rivalry | L 68–78 | 4–7 | 18 – Silva | 7 – Tied | 4 – Lawson | Colonial Life Arena (12,269); Columbia, SC |
| December 31, 2018*; 2:00 pm, SECN+ | | North Greenville | W 97–46 | 5–7 | 22 – Lawson | 9 – Silva | 9 – Gravett | Colonial Life Arena (8,974); Columbia, SC |
| January 5, 2019; 7:00 pm, ESPN2 | | at Florida | W 71–69 | 6–7 (1–0) | 22 – Gravett | 7 – Kotsar | 4 – Campbell | Exactech Arena (10,230); Gainesville, FL |
| January 8, 2019; 9:00 pm, ESPNU | | No. 14 Mississippi State | W 87–82 ^{OT} | 7–7 (2–0) | 25 – Kotsar | 12 – Silva | 4 – Silva | Colonial Life Arena (8,776); Columbia, SC |
| January 13, 2019; 1:00 pm, SECN+ | | Missouri | W 85–75 | 8–7 (3–0) | 15 – Bryant | 7 – Kotsar | 4 – Lawson | Colonial Life Arena (12,747); Columbia, SC |
| January 16, 2019; 7:00 pm, SECN | | at Vanderbilt | W 74–71 | 9–7 (4–0) | 24 – Lawson | 6 – Bryant | 3 – Hasse | Memorial Gymnasium (8,400); Nashville, TN |
| January 19, 2019; 6:00 pm, SECN | | at LSU | L 67–89 | 9–8 (4–1) | 18 – Lawson | 5 – Lawson | 2 – Tied | Pete Maravich Assembly Center (11,607); Baton Rouge, LA |
| January 22, 2019; 6:30 pm, SECN | | No. 16 Auburn | W 80–77 | 10–8 (5–1) | 32 – Silva | 14 – Silva | 6 – Gravett | Colonial Life Arena (13,857); Columbia, SC |
| January 26, 2019*; 2:00 pm, ESPNU | | at Oklahoma State; Big 12/SEC Challenge | L 70–74 | 10–9 | 15 – Silva | 9 – Silva | 5 – Bryant | Gallagher-Iba Arena (7,658); Stillwater, OK |
| January 29, 2019; 6:30 pm, SECN | | No. 1 Tennessee | L 70–92 | 10–10 (5–2) | 28 – Silva | 10 – Silva | 3 – Gravett | Colonial Life Arena (18,000); Columbia, SC |
| February 2, 2019; 1:00 pm, SECN | | at Georgia | W 86–80 | 11–10 (6–2) | 19 – Tied | 7 – Lawson | 7 – Campbell | Stegeman Coliseum (9,820); Athens, GA |
| February 5, 2019; 7:00 pm, SECN | | at No. 5 Kentucky | L 48–76 | 11–11 (6–3) | 12 – Tied | 4 – Tied | 2 – Tied | Rupp Arena (20,496); Lexington, KY |
| February 9, 2019; 3:30 pm, SECN | | Arkansas | W 77–65 | 12–11 (7–3) | 24 – Lawson | 8 – Silva | 3 – Tied | Colonial Life Arena (12,374); Columbia, SC |
| February 13, 2019; 6:30 pm, SECN | | at No. 1 Tennessee | L 73–85 | 12–12 (7–4) | 19 – Campbell | 15 – Silva | 6 – Lawson | Thompson–Boling Arena (19,407); Knoxville, TN |
| February 16, 2019; 1:00 pm, SECN | | Texas A&M | W 84–77 | 13–12 (8–4) | 23 – Lawson | 14 – Silva | 6 – Campbell | Colonial Life Arena (13,473); Columbia, SC |
| February 19, 2019; 7:00 pm, SECN | | Ole Miss | W 79–64 | 14–12 (9–4) | 18 – Silva | 9 – Lawson | 6 – Lawson | Colonial Life Arena (10,455); Columbia, SC |
| February 23, 2019; 6:00 pm, SECN | | at Mississippi State | L 61–76 | 14–13 (9–5) | 18 – Lawson | 5 – Tied | 7 – Campbell | Humphrey Coliseum (8,655); Starkville, MS |
| February 26, 2019; 7:00 pm, ESPN2 | | Alabama | L 62–68 | 14–14 (9–6) | 23 – Silva | 12 – Silva | 5 – Lawson | Colonial Life Arena (11,164); Columbia, SC |
| March 2, 2019; 3:30 pm, SECN | | at Missouri | L 63–78 | 14–15 (9–7) | 20 – Gravett | 7 – Bryant | 3 – Campbell | Mizzou Arena (10,376); Columbia, MO |
| March 5, 2019; 7:00 pm, SECN | | at Texas A&M | W 71–54 | 15–15 (10–7) | 22 – Silva | 17 – Silva | 9 – Campbell | Reed Arena (5,032); College Station, TX |
| March 9, 2019; 1:00 pm, SECN | | Georgia | W 66–46 | 16–15 (11–7) | 24 – Silva | 10 – Silva | 2 – Tied | Colonial Life Arena (11,927); Columbia, SC |
SEC tournament
| March 15, 2019; 3:00 pm, ESPN | (4) | vs. (5) No. 22 Auburn; Quarterfinals | L 64–73 | 16–16 | 27 – Silva | 11 – Silva | 5 – Campbell | Bridgestone Arena (16,490); Nashville, TN |
*Non-conference game. ^{#}Rankings from AP Poll. (#) Tournament seedings in parentheses. All times are in Eastern Time.
