= 2018–19 Ole Miss Rebels men's basketball team =

American college basketball season

2018–19 Ole Miss Rebels men's basketball

NCAA tournament, First Round
- Conference: Southeastern Conference
- Record: 20–13 (10–8 SEC)
- Head coach: Kermit Davis (1st season)
- Assistant coaches: Win Case; Ronnie Hamilton; Levi Watkins
- Home arena: The Pavilion at Ole Miss

2018–19 Southeastern Conference men's basketball standings
	Conf.				Overall
Team	W		L	PCT	W		L	PCT
No. 15 LSU	16	–	2	.889	28	–	7	.800
No. 10 Tennessee	15	–	3	.833	31	–	6	.838
No. 7 Kentucky	15	–	3	.833	30	–	7	.811
No. 5 Auburn†	11	–	7	.611	30	–	10	.750
South Carolina	11	–	7	.611	16	–	16	.500
Mississippi State	10	–	8	.556	23	–	11	.676
Ole Miss	10	–	8	.556	20	–	13	.606
Florida	9	–	9	.500	20	–	16	.556
Alabama	8	–	10	.444	18	–	16	.529
Arkansas	8	–	10	.444	18	–	16	.529
Texas A&M	6	–	12	.333	14	–	18	.438
Missouri	5	–	13	.278	15	–	17	.469
Georgia	2	–	16	.111	11	–	21	.344
Vanderbilt	0	–	18	.000	9	–	23	.281
† 2019 SEC tournament winner Rankings from AP Poll

The 2018–19 Ole Miss Rebels men's basketball team represented the University of Mississippi in the 2018–19 NCAA Division I men's basketball season, their 109th basketball season. The Rebels were led by first-year, SEC Coach of the Year, Kermit Davis. The Rebels played their games at The Pavilion at Ole Miss in Oxford, Mississippi as members of the Southeastern Conference. The Rebels had an eight-win improvement from their previous season, which was eleventh best in Division I. The Rebels returned to the NCAA Tournament for the first time since 2015, where they were defeated in the first round by 9th seeded Oklahoma.

== Previous season ==
The Rebels finished the 2017–18 season 12–20, 5–13 in SEC play to finish in last place. They lost in the first round of the SEC tournament to South Carolina.

On February 12, 2018, 12th-year head coach Andy Kennedy, the school's all-time winningest head coach, and the school mutually agreed to part ways following the end of the season. However, on February 19, Kennedy announced that he would depart immediately, with assistant Madlock taking over on an interim basis. On March 15, 2018, it was announced that Ole Miss had hired Middle Tennessee head coach Kermit Davis as head coach of the Rebels.

== Offseason ==
=== Departures ===
Name	Number	Pos.	Height	Weight	Year	Hometown	Reason for departure
Deandre Burnett	1	G	6'2"	192	RS Senior	Miami Gardens, FL	Graduated
Marcanvis Hymon	2	F	6'7"	220	Senior	Memphis, TN	Graduated
Markel Crawford	5	G	6'4"	210	Senior	Memphis, TN	Graduated
Karlis Silins	22	C	6'11"	245	Sophomore	Riga, Latvia	Transferred to Florida Atlantic
Lane Below	24	G	6'1"	185	Senior	Advance, MO	Graduated
Jake Coddington	30	F	6'6"	212	RS Senior	Edwardsville, IL	Graduated
Ilya Tyrtyshnik	34	G	6'3"	185	Freshman	Kyiv, Ukraine	Left team
Justas Furmanavičius	50	F	6'7"	210	Senior	Kaunas, Lithuania	Graduated

=== Incoming transfers ===
Name	Number	Pos.	Height	Weight	Year	Hometown	Previous School
Zach Naylor	1	G/F	6'7"		Junior	Richmond, TX	Weatherford College
Brian Halums	5	F	6'5"	190	Junior	Hollandale, MS	Itawamba Community College

=== 2018 recruiting class ===
College recruiting information
Name	Hometown	School	Height	Weight	Commit date
Blake Hinson #42 SF	Deltona, FL	Sunrise Christian Academy	6 ft 7 in (2.01 m)	230 lb (100 kg)	Apr 28, 2018
Blake Hinson #42 SF	Recruit ratings: Scout: Rivals: 247Sports: ESPN:				
KJ Buffen; SF	Gainesville, GA	Gainesville High School	6 ft 7 in (2.01 m)	205 lb (93 kg)	Apr 25, 2018
KJ Buffen; SF	Recruit ratings: Scout: Rivals: 247Sports: ESPN:				
Franco Miller Jr. PG	Freeport, Bahamas	Crestwood Academy	6 ft 2 in (1.88 m)	180 lb (82 kg)	May 10, 2018
Franco Miller Jr. PG	Recruit ratings: Scout: Rivals: 247Sports: ESPN:				
Luis Rodriguez; SG	Los Angeles, CA	Woodstock Academy	6 ft 5 in (1.96 m)	200 lb (91 kg)	May 10, 2018
Luis Rodriguez; SG	Recruit ratings: Scout: Rivals: 247Sports: ESPN:				
Carlos Curry; C	Albany, GA	Dougherty Comprehensive	6 ft 11 in (2.11 m)	220 lb (100 kg)	May 16, 2018
Carlos Curry; C	Recruit ratings: Scout: Rivals: 247Sports: ESPN:				
Overall recruit ranking:
Note: In many cases, Scout, Rivals, 247Sports, On3, and ESPN may conflict in their listings of height and weight.; In these cases, the average was taken. ESPN grades are on a 100-point scale.; Sources: "Ole Miss 2018 Basketball Commitments". Rivals.; "2018 Team Ranking". Rivals.

== Roster ==
2018–19 Ole Miss Rebels men's basketball team
Players
Coaches

Pos.	#	Name	Height	Weight	Year	Previous school	Hometown
G/F	0	Blake Hinson	6 ft 7 in (2.01 m)	229 lb (104 kg)	Fr	Sunrise Christian Academy	Deltona, FL
F	1	Zach Naylor	6 ft 8 in (2.03 m)	220 lb (100 kg)	Jr	Travis HS; Weatherford College	Houston, TX
G	2	Devontae Shuler	6 ft 2 in (1.88 m)	192 lb (87 kg)	So	Oak Hill Academy	Irmo, SC
G	3	Terence Davis	6 ft 4 in (1.93 m)	201 lb (91 kg)	Sr	Southaven HS	Southaven, MS
G	4	Breein Tyree	6 ft 2 in (1.88 m)	192 lb (87 kg)	Jr	St. Joseph HS	Somerset, NJ
G	5	Brian Halums	6 ft 5 in (1.96 m)	188 lb (85 kg)	Jr	Simmons HS; Itawamba CC	Hollandale, MS
F	10	Carlos Curry (redshirt)	6 ft 11 in (2.11 m)	235 lb (107 kg)	Fr	Dougherty Comprehensive	Albany, GA
G	11	Franco Miller Jr. (injured) (redshirt)	6 ft 2 in (1.88 m)	202 lb (92 kg)	Fr	Crestwood Prep	Freeport, Bahamas
F	12	Bruce Stevens	6 ft 8 in (2.03 m)	252 lb (114 kg)	Sr	Bay Springs HS; Jones County JC	Bay Springs, MS
C	13	Dominik Olejniczak	7 ft 0 in (2.13 m)	255 lb (116 kg)	RS Jr	SMS Cetniewo Academy; Drake	Toruń, Poland
F	14	KJ Buffen	6 ft 7 in (2.01 m)	220 lb (100 kg)	Fr	Gainesville	Gainesville, GA
G/F	15	Luis Rodriguez	6 ft 6 in (1.98 m)	202 lb (92 kg)	Fr	Woodstock Academy	Los Angeles, CA
G	20	D.C. Davis	5 ft 11 in (1.8 m)	175 lb (79 kg)	Sr	Purvis HS; Jones County JC	Purvis, MS
G	30	Antonio Morgano (W)	5 ft 10 in (1.78 m)	165 lb (75 kg)	So	Morgantown HS	Morgantown, WV
G	33	John McBride (W)	6 ft 5 in (1.96 m)	216 lb (98 kg)	Fr	Memphis University School	Memphis, TN

Head coach

- Kermit Davis (Mississippi State)

Assistant coach(es)

- Win Case (Oklahoma City)
- Ronnie Hamilton (UNC Pembroke)
- Levi Watkins (NC State)

Legend

- (C) Team captain
- (S) Suspended
- (I) Ineligible
- (W) Walk-on
- Injured
- Current redshirt

Roster

== Schedule and results ==
Date time, TV	Rank^{#}	Opponent^{#}	Result	Record	High points	High rebounds	High assists	Site (attendance) city, state
Exhibition
November 2, 2018*; 2:00 pm, SECN+		Fayetteville State	W 101–52		20 – T. Davis	10 – Stevens	9 – Buffen	The Pavilion at Ole Miss; Oxford, MS
Regular season
November 10, 2018*; 3:00 pm, SECN+		Western Michigan; Emerald Coast Classic first round	W 90–64	1–0	17 – T. Davis	5 – Stevens	3 – Tied	The Pavilion at Ole Miss (5,205); Oxford, MS
November 16, 2018*; 7:00 pm, FS2		at Butler	L 76–83	1–1	30 – T. Davis	8 – Shuler	5 – Tied	Hinkle Fieldhouse (8,328); Indianapolis, IN
November 20, 2018*; 6:00 pm, SECN		Nicholls; Emerald Coast Classic second round	W 75–55	2–1	14 – T. Davis	8 – T. Davis	6 – Tied	The Pavilion at Ole Miss (5,903); Oxford, MS
November 23, 2018*; 8:30 pm, CBSSN		vs. Baylor; Emerald Coast Classic semifinals	W 78–70	3–1	28 – Tyree	8 – Stevens	3 – Tied	The Arena at NFSC (1,250); Niceville, FL
November 24, 2018*; 6:00 pm, CBSSN		vs. Cincinnati; Emerald Coast Classic championship	L 57–71	3–2	24 – Shuler	6 – Tied	2 – T. Davis	The Arena at NFSC (1,250); Niceville, FL
November 28, 2018*; 6:30 pm, SECN+		San Diego	W 93–86	4–2	22 – Tyree	7 – Buffen	9 – T. Davis	The Pavilion at Ole Miss (5,968); Oxford, MS
December 1, 2018*; 1:00 pm, SECN+		Louisiana–Monroe	W 83–60	5–2	20 – Tyree	8 – T. Davis	6 – Shuler	The Pavilion at Ole Miss (6,128); Oxford, MS
December 8, 2018*; 7:00 pm, ESPN+		at Illinois State	W 81–74	6–2	22 – Tyree	7 – Tied	6 – Tyree	Redbird Arena (6,598); Normal, IL
December 12, 2018*; 6:30 pm, SECN+		vs. Southeastern Louisiana; Jackson Showcase	W 69–47	7–2	19 – Shuler	7 – Stevens	4 – T. Davis	Mississippi Coliseum (3,564); Jackson, MS
December 16, 2018*; 5:00 pm, SECN		Chattanooga	W 90–70	8–2	20 – Tied	5 – T. Davis	7 – T. Davis	The Pavilion at Ole Miss (6,344); Oxford, MS
December 21, 2018*; 7:00 pm, Facebook		at Middle Tennessee; Battle at Bridgestone	W 74–56	9–2	24 – Tyree	9 – Buffen	4 – T. Davis	Bridgestone Arena (11,294); Nashville, TN
December 28, 2018*; 3:00 pm, SECN+		Florida Gulf Coast	W 87–57	10–2	20 – T. Davis	6 – T. Davis	6 – Tyree	The Pavilion at Ole Miss (7,551); Oxford, MS
January 5, 2019; 7:30 pm, SECN		at Vanderbilt	W 81–71	11–2 (1–0)	31 – Tyree	7 – Tied	6 – Shuler	Memorial Gymnasium (10,422); Nashville, TN
January 9, 2019; 6:00 pm, ESPN2		No. 11 Auburn	W 82–67	12–2 (2–0)	27 – T. Davis	12 – T. Davis	4 – Hinson	The Pavilion at Ole Miss (8,241); Oxford, MS
January 12, 2019; 12:00 pm, CBS		at No. 14 Mississippi State	W 81–77	13–2 (3–0)	26 – Hinson	8 – Stevens	5 – Tyree	Humphrey Coliseum (10,021); Starkville, MS
January 15, 2019; 8:00 pm, SECN	No. 18	LSU	L 69–83	13–3 (3–1)	21 – T. Davis	10 – T. Davis	6 – Shuler	The Pavilion at Ole Miss (9,500); Oxford, MS
January 19, 2019; 12:00 pm, SECN	No. 18	Arkansas	W 84–67	14–3 (4–1)	22 – Tyree	9 – T. Davis	7 – T. Davis	The Pavilion at Ole Miss (9,500); Oxford, MS
January 22, 2019; 8:00 pm, ESPNU	No. 20	at Alabama	L 53–74	14–4 (4–2)	10 – T. Davis	6 – Tied	2 – Tyree	Coleman Coliseum (10,710); Tuscaloosa, AL
January 26, 2019*; 11:00 am, ESPN	No. 20	No. 24 Iowa State; Big 12/SEC Challenge	L 73–87	14–5	22 – Tyree	6 – T. Davis	4 – Tied	The Pavilion at Ole Miss (8,839); Oxford, MS
January 30, 2019; 5:30 pm, SECN		at Florida	L 86–90 ^{OT}	14–6 (4–3)	26 – T. Davis	12 – T. Davis	5 – T. Davis	Exactech Arena (9,380); Gainesville, FL
February 2, 2019; 2:30 pm, SECN		No. 22 Mississippi State	L 75–81	14–7 (4–4)	25 – Tyree	8 – T. Davis	5 – Shuler	The Pavilion at Ole Miss (9,500); Oxford, MS
February 6, 2019; 6:00 pm, SECN		Texas A&M	W 75–71	15–7 (5–4)	22 – Tyree	8 – T. Davis	5 – T. Davis	The Pavilion at Ole Miss (7,718); Oxford, MS
February 9, 2019; 12:00 pm, SECN		at Georgia	W 80–64	16–7 (6–4)	31 – Tyree	9 – Stevens	4 – T. Davis	Stegeman Coliseum (10,033); Athens, GA
February 13, 2019; 7:30 pm, SECN		at Auburn	W 60–55	17–7 (7–4)	20 – Tyree	5 – Stevens	4 – Shuler	Auburn Arena (7,337); Auburn, AL
February 16, 2019; 2:30 pm, SECN		Missouri	W 75–65	18–7 (8–4)	17 – Stevens	4 – Tied	4 – Tied	The Pavilion at Ole Miss (8,248); Oxford, MS
February 19, 2019; 6:00 pm, SECN		at South Carolina	L 64–79	18–8 (8–5)	18 – T. Davis	8 – Buffen	5 – Tyree	Colonial Life Arena (10,455); Columbia, SC
February 23, 2019; 2:30 pm, SECN		Georgia	W 72–71	19–8 (9–5)	17 – Tyree	5 – Tied	4 – T. Davis	The Pavilion at Ole Miss (7,416); Oxford, MS
February 27, 2019; 6:00 pm, SECN		No. 7 Tennessee	L 71–73	19–9 (9–6)	16 – Tied	10 – Stevens	5 – Tyree	The Pavilion at Ole Miss (9,500); Oxford, MS
March 2, 2019; 12:00 pm, SECN		at Arkansas	L 73–74	19–10 (9–7)	20 – Tyree	6 – Shuler	5 – Tyree	Bud Walton Arena (17,320); Fayetteville, AR
March 5, 2019; 8:00 pm, ESPN		No. 6 Kentucky	L 76–80	19–11 (9–8)	25 – T. Davis	12 – T. Davis	4 – Tyree	The Pavilion at Ole Miss (9,500); Oxford, MS
March 9, 2019; 2:30 pm, SECN		at Missouri	W 73–68	20–11 (10–8)	21 – Tyree	6 – Buffen	4 – Shuler	Mizzou Arena (11,050); Columbia, MO
SEC tournament
March 14, 2019; 6:00 pm, SECN	(7)	vs. (10) Alabama; Second Round	L 57–62	20–12	14 – Shuler	7 – Shuler	4 – T. Davis	Bridgestone Arena (14,813); Nashville, TN
NCAA tournament
March 22, 2019*; 11:40 am, truTV	(8 S)	vs. (9 S) Oklahoma; First Round	L 72–95	20–13	17 – T. Davis	6 – Tied	6 – T. Davis	Colonial Life Arena (15,417); Columbia, SC
*Non-conference game. ^{#}Rankings from AP Poll. (#) Tournament seedings in parentheses. S=South. All times are in Central Time.

== Rankings ==
Ranking movements Legend: ██ Increase in ranking ██ Decrease in ranking — = Not ranked RV = Received votes
	Week																			
Poll	Pre	1	2	3	4	5	6	7	8	9	10	11	12	13	14	15	16	17	18	Final
AP	—	—	—	—	—	—	—	—	—	—	18	20	RV	—	—	RV	—	—	—	Not released
Coaches	—	—^	—	—	—	—	—	—	—	—	20	20	RV	RV	RV	RV	—	—	—	—

*AP does not release post-NCAA Tournament rankings
^Coaches did not release a Week 2 poll.
