= Sacred Heart of Jesus Catholic School (McClellan, Alabama) =

Location
- 16 Morton Road; Anniston, (Calhoun County), Alabama 36205; United States
- Coordinates: 33.7175°N 85.8146°W

Information
- Type: Private, coeducational
- Religious affiliation: Roman Catholic
- Established: 1953
- Authority: Diocese of Birmingham
- Principal: MARK PROPER
- Chaplain: Fr. McDonald
- Grades: Pre-K–12
- Enrolment: 275
- Classes: K3-12
- Average class size: 17
- Colors: Maroon, Navy, and Gold
- Mascot: Cardinal
- Team name: Cardinals
- Accreditation: Southern Association of Colleges and Schools
- Affiliation: National Catholic Educational Association
- Website: www.shcards.org

Sacred Heart of Jesus Catholic School is a private, Roman Catholic school, serving students pre-K through 12th grade, located on the old Fort McClellan Army Base in McClellan, Alabama. It is a part of the Roman Catholic Diocese of Birmingham in Alabama.

== History ==
Sacred Heart of Jesus Catholic Mission was organized in the late nineteenth century by Jesuit missionaries in downtown Anniston, and after half a century, the mission became a parish and opened a school. In 1952, under the leadership of Father Frank Giri, the parish purchased the Wilmer Avenue School building on the corner of Wilmer and 15th, and after extensive renovations, opened its doors to eighty students on September 1, 1953. The school originally offered grades one through four and was run by four Benedictine sisters: Sr. Hildegarde, Sr. Rita, Sr. Loretta, and "little" Sr. Carmelita as she was known. An additional grade was added each academic year until the school offered grades one through eight.

Based on the increased demand for Catholic education in the area, a campaign was made in 1956 by Father Giri and Sacred Heart parishioners to build a new school on a 14-acre plot on McCall Drive. The new school, now called St. Mary's Catholic, opened for the 1957 academic year, and in its first year of operation, served over 180 students. At that time, the school allocated roughly ten percent of their enrollment for non-Catholics.

During the 1970s, St. Mary's experienced some significant changes. Even though the number of students remained roughly around 200, the school permitted a greater number of non-Catholics, averaging roughly 35 to 45 percent of overall enrollment. In 1973, the Benedictine Sisters, who had run the school since its inception, returned to their convent in Cullman, Alabama, leaving the school to be administered by Sacred Heart parish. In August of that year, R. James Finley became the first lay principal, and with the exception of two sisters from the order of the Immaculate Heart of Mary, the faculty was entirely laity. The school's name also reverted to Sacred Heart of Jesus Catholic School that same year.

In 2000, under the leadership of Father Richard Donohoe, Sacred Heart capitalized on an opportunity to purchase a much larger school building on the recently closed Fort McClellan Army Base. Father Donohoe and Sacred Heart parishioners wanted to expand the school from an elementary and middle school to a comprehensive PK–12 institution. In fall 2000, the school moved from McCall Drive to its current location on the fort. That first year, they added a ninth grade, as well as a pre-K program. (The kindergarten program began earlier at St. Mary's School in fall 1981.) The following year, Sacred Heart added grades ten and eleven and then admitted its first senior class in the fall of 2002. Current school enrollment is roughly 275 students, the highest number in the school's history.

== Activities ==
=== Athletics ===
- Boys' Basketball- Class 1A AHSAA State Champions: 2015, 2016, 2017
- Girls' Basketball
- Cross Country
- Boys' Soccer
- Girls' Soccer
- Volleyball
- Swimming- Class 1A AHSAA State Qualifying- 2016
- Golf
- Cheerleading

=== Clubs ===
Sacred Heart has several student-operated clubs. These clubs currently include: (listed alphabetically)

- Junior Beta Club
- Lifeguards (Pro-Life Christian Organization)
- Liturgy Committee
- Mu Alpha Theta
- Robotics Club
- Senior Beta Club
- SCHOLAR'S BOWL TEAM
- Spanish Club
- Student Government Association
- Writers' Bowl
- Youth Choir
