= 2016–17 Missouri Valley Conference men's basketball season =

- League: NCAA Division I
- Sport: Basketball
- Teams: 10
- TV partner(s): ESPN3, CBSSN, CBS

Regular Season
- 2017 MVC Champions: Illinois State and Wichita State (co-champions)
- Season MVP: Paris Lee, Illinois State

Tournament
- Champions: Wichita State
- Runners-up: Illinois State
- Finals MVP: Conner Frankamp, Wichita State

Basketball seasons
- ← 2015–16 2017–18

2016–17 Missouri Valley Conference men's basketball standings
	Conf.				Overall
Team	W		L	PCT	W		L	PCT
Illinois State	17	–	1	.944	28	–	7	.800
No. 19 Wichita State†	17	–	1	.944	31	–	5	.861
Northern Iowa	9	–	9	.500	14	–	16	.467
Southern Illinois	9	–	9	.500	17	–	16	.515
Loyola Chicago	8	–	10	.444	18	–	14	.563
Missouri State	7	–	11	.389	17	–	16	.515
Bradley	7	–	11	.389	13	–	20	.394
Evansville	6	–	12	.333	16	–	17	.485
Indiana State	5	–	13	.278	11	–	20	.355
Drake	5	–	13	.278	7	–	24	.226
† 2017 MVC tournament winner Rankings from AP poll

The 2016–17 Missouri Valley Conference men's basketball season began with practices in October 2016, followed by the start of the 2016–17 NCAA Division I men's basketball season in November. Conference play began on December 28, 2016, and concluded in March.

Illinois State and Wichita State shared the regular season championship with matching records of 17–1. Due to tiebreakers, Illinois State received the conference's No. 1 seed in the Missouri Valley Conference tournament.

Illinois State's Paris Lee was named Conference Player of the Year and Dan Muller was named Coach of the Year.

The MVC Tournament was held from March 2–5 at the Scottrade Center in St. Louis, Missouri. Wichita State defeated Illinois State to win the tournament championship. As a result, the Shockers received the conference's automatic bid to the NCAA tournament. No other MVC team received a bid to the NCAA Tournament. Illinois State received a bid to the National Invitation Tournament.

The season marked Wichita State's final season as an MVC member. Shortly after the end of the NCAA Tournament, the Shockers announced their departure for the American Athletic Conference, effective July 1, 2017.

== Head coaches ==
=== Coaches ===
Team	Head coach	Previous job	Year at school	Overall record	MVC record	MVC championships	NCAA Tournaments
Bradley	Brian Wardle	Green Bay	2	18–47	10–26	0	0
Drake	Jeff Rutter	Drake (asst.)	1	6–17	5–13	0	0
Evansville	Marty Simmons	SIU Edwardsville	10	158–155	75–105	0	0
Illinois State	Dan Muller	Vanderbilt (asst.)	5	104–65	57–33	1	0
Indiana State	Greg Lansing	Indiana State (asst.)	7	120–108	65–61	0	1
Loyola	Porter Moser	Saint Louis (asst.)	6	89–105	27–45	0	0
Missouri State	Paul Lusk	Purdue (asst.)	7	88–106	45–64	0	0
Northern Iowa	Ben Jacobson	Northern Iowa (asst.)	10	234–134	123–75	2	4
Southern Illinois	Barry Hinson	Kansas (admin.)	5	77–80	36–48	0	0
Wichita State	Gregg Marshall	Winthrop	10	261–90	132–46	5	6

Notes:

- All records, appearances, titles, etc. are from time with current school only.
- Year at school includes 2016–17 season.
- Overall and MVC records are from time at current school and are through the end of the 2016–17 season.
- Fourth-year head coach Ray Giacoletti resigned on December 6, 2016 after the first eight games of the season. Assistant coach Jeff Rutter was named interim head coach.

== Preseason ==
=== Preseason poll ===
Rank	Team
1.	Wichita State (37)
2.	Illinois State (4)
3.	Northern Iowa (1)
4.	Missouri State
5.	Southern Illinois
6.	Indiana State
7.	Loyola
8.	Bradley
9.	Evansville
10.	Drake
(first place votes)

=== Preseason All-MVC teams ===
Honor	Recipient
Preseason Player of the Year	Jeremy Morgan, Northern Iowa
Preseason All-MVC First Team
Preseason All-MVC First Team	Paris Lee, Illinois State
Preseason All-MVC First Team	MiKyle McIntosh, Illinois State
Preseason All-MVC First Team	Markis McDuffie, Wichita State
Preseason All-MVC First Team	Jeremy Morgan, Northern Iowa
Preseason All-MVC First Team	Brenton Scott, Indiana State
Preseason All-MVC Second Team
Preseason All-MVC Second Team	Milton Doyle, Loyola–Chicago
Preseason All-MVC Second Team	Dequon Miller, Missouri State
Preseason All-MVC Second Team	Shaquille Morris, Wichita State
Preseason All-MVC Second Team	Sean O'Brien, Southern Illinois
Preseason All-MVC Second Team	Reed Timmer, Drake

== Regular season ==
According to college basketball statistical guru Ken Pomeroy, the MVC had "the most unusual conference table in the land" for the season. The co-champions Illinois State and Wichita State were the only two teams that finished above .500 in conference play, each finishing with only one conference loss (splitting their two regular-season matchups). This made the MVC the first Division I conference to have two men's teams finish with no more than one conference loss since the MEAC in 2013, and also marked the first time that a Division I conference with 10 or more members had only two teams with winning league records since the MVC itself in 2012 (which had a five-team tie for third place at 9–9).

=== Head-to-head results ===
	Bradley	Drake	Evansville	Illinois State	Indiana State	Loyola	Missouri State	Northern Iowa	Southern Illinois	Wichita State
vs. Bradley	–	0–2	0–2	2–0	2–0	2–0	1–1	1–1	1–1	2–0
vs. Drake	2–0	–	1–1	2–0	1–1	1–1	1–1	2–0	1–1	2–0
vs. Evansville	2–0	1–1	–	2–0	1–1	1–1	1–1	1–1	1–1	2–0
vs. Illinois State	0–2	0–2	0–2	–	0–2	0–2	0–2	0–2	0–2	1–1
vs. Indiana State	0–2	1–1	1–1	2–0	–	2–0	2–0	1–1	2–0	2–0
vs. Loyola	0–2	1–1	1–1	2–0	0–2	–	1–1	1–1	2–0	2–0
vs. Missouri State	1–1	1–1	1–1	2–0	0–2	1–1	–	1–1	2–0	2–0
vs. Northern Iowa	1–1	0–2	1–1	2–0	1–1	1–1	1–1	–	0–2	2–0
vs. Southern Illinois	1–1	1–1	1–1	2–0	0–2	0–2	0–2	2–0	–	2–0
vs. Wichita State	0–2	0–2	0–2	1–1	0–2	0–2	0–2	0–2	0–2	–
Total	7–11	5–13	6–12	17–1	5–13	8–12	7–11	9–9	9–9	17–1

== Player of the week ==
Week	Player of the week	Newcomer of the week
Nov. 14	Alize Johnson, Missouri State	
Nov. 21	Jeremy Morgan, Northern Iowa	Aundre Jackson, Loyola–Chicago
Nov. 28	Darrell Brown, Jr., Bradley	Aundre Jackson, Loyola–Chicago
Dec, 5	Paris Lee, Illinois State	Aundre Jackson, Loyola–Chicago
Dec. 12	Jeremy Morgan, Northern Iowa	Alize Johnson, Missouri State
Dec. 19	Paris Lee, Illinois State	Ryan Taylor, Evansville
Dec. 26	Jaylon Brown, Evansville	Alize Johnson, Missouri State
Jan. 2	Alize Johnson, Missouri State	Alize Johnson, Missouri State
Jan. 9	Milton Doyle, Loyola–Chicago	Landry Shamet, Wichita State
Jan. 16	MiKyle McIntosh, Illinois State	Aundre Jackson, Loyola–Chicago
Jan. 23	Shaquille Morris, Wichita State	Alize Johnson, Missouri State
Jan. 30	Milton Doyle, Loyola–Chicago	Phil Fayne, Illinois State
Feb. 6	Conner Frankamp, Wichita State	Thik Bol, Southern Illinois
Feb. 13	Paris Lee, Illinois State	Ryan Taylor, Evansville
Feb. 20	Deontae Hawkins, Illinois State	Alize Johnson, Missouri State

== Conference Awards ==
Award	Recipients
Larry Bird Player of the Year	Paris Lee, Illinois State
Coach of the Year	Dan Muller, Illinois State
Newcomer of the Year	Alize Johnson, Missouri State
Freshman of the Year	Landry Shamet, Wichita State
Defensive MVP	Paris Lee, Illinois State
Sixth-Man of the Year	Aundre Jackson, Loyola–Chicago
All-MVC First Team	Milton Doyle, Loyola–Chicago; Alize Johnson, Missouri State. Paris Lee, Illinois State; Markis McDuffie, Wichita State; Landry Shamet, Wichita State
All-MVC Second Team	Jaylon Brown, Evansville; Deontae Hawkins, Illinois State; MiKyle McIntosh, Illinois State; Jeremy Morgan, Northern Iowa; Sean O'Brien, Southern Illinois
All-MVC Third Team	Conner Frankamp, Wichita State; Donte Ingram, Loyola–Chicago; Shaquille Morris, Wichita State; Brenton Scott, Indiana State; Reed Timmer, Drake
All-Newcomer Team	Phil Fayne, Illinois State; Aundre Jackson, Loyola–Chicago; Alize Johnson, Missouri State; Landry Shamet, Wichita State; Darral Willis Jr., Wichita State
All-Freshmen Team	Koch Bar, Bradley; Jordan Barnes, Indiana State; Darrell Brown Jr., Bradley; Spencer Haldeman, Northern Iowa; Landry Shamet, Wichita State; Dru Smith, Evansville
All-Defensive Team	Thik Bol, Southern Illinois; Zach Brown, Wichita State; Obediah Church, Missouri State; Paris Lee, Illinois State; Jeremy Morgan, Northern Iowa; Tony Wills, Illinois State

== Postseason ==
=== Missouri Valley Conference tournament ===
Teams were seeded by conference record, with ties broken by record between the tied teams followed by overall adjusted RPI, if necessary. The top six seeds received first-round byes.

Game	Time*	Matchup	Final score	Television
First round – Thursday, March 2
1	6:05 pm	No. 8 Evansville vs. No. 9 Indiana State	83–72	ESPN3/FSMW/CSNC
2	8:35 pm	No. 7 Bradley vs. No. 10 Drake	67–58	ESPN3/FSMW/CSNC
Quarterfinals – Friday, March 3
3	12:05 pm	No. 1 Illinois State vs. No. 8 Evansville	80–69	ESPN3/FSMW/CSNC
4	2:35 pm	No. 4 Southern Illinois vs. No. 5 Loyola–Chicago	55-50	ESPN3/FSMW/CSNC
5	6:05 pm	No. 2 Wichita State vs. No. 7 Bradley	82–56	ESPN3/FSMW/CSNC
6	8:35 pm	No. 3 Northern Iowa vs. No. 6 Missouri State	64–70	ESPN3/FSMW/CSNC
Semifinals – Saturday, March 4
7	2:35 pm	No. 1 Illinois State vs. No. 4 Southern Illinois	63–50	CBSSN
8	5:05 pm	No. 2 Wichita State vs. No. 6 Missouri State	78–63	CBSSN
Championship – Sunday, March 5
10	1:05 pm	No. 1 Illinois State vs. No. 2 Wichita State	51–71	CBS
*Game times in CT. Rankings denote tournament seeding.

=== NCAA tournament ===
The winner of the MVC tournament received an automatic bid to the 2017 NCAA Division I men's basketball tournament.

Seed	Region	School	First Four	First round	Second round	Sweet Sixteen	Elite Eight	Final Four	Championship
10	South	Wichita State	N/A	defeated (7) Dayton 64–58	eliminated by (2) Kentucky				
		W–L (%):	0–0 (–)	1–0 (1.000)	0–1 (.000)	0–0 (–)	0–0 (–)	0–0 (–)	0–0 (–) Total: 1–1 (.500)

=== National Invitation tournament ===
One MVC team, Illinois State, received an invitation to the National Invitation Tournament.

Seed	Bracket	School	First round	Second round	Quarterfinals	Semifinals	Finals
1	Illinois State	Illinois State	defeated (8) UC Irvine 85–71	eliminated by (4) UCF			
		W–L (%):	1–0 (1.000)	0–1 (.000)	0–0 (–)	0–0 (–)	0–0 (–) Total: 1–1 (.500)
