= 2016–17 Loyola Ramblers men's basketball team =

American college basketball season

2016–17 Loyola Ramblers men's basketball
- Conference: Missouri Valley Conference
- Record: 18–14 (8–10 MVC)
- Head coach: Porter Moser (6th season)
- Assistant coaches: Bennie Seltzer; Bryan Mullins; Matt Gordon
- Home arena: Joseph J. Gentile Arena

2016–17 Missouri Valley Conference men's basketball standings
	Conf.				Overall
Team	W		L	PCT	W		L	PCT
Illinois State	17	–	1	.944	28	–	7	.800
No. 19 Wichita State†	17	–	1	.944	31	–	5	.861
Northern Iowa	9	–	9	.500	14	–	16	.467
Southern Illinois	9	–	9	.500	17	–	16	.515
Loyola Chicago	8	–	10	.444	18	–	14	.563
Missouri State	7	–	11	.389	17	–	16	.515
Bradley	7	–	11	.389	13	–	20	.394
Evansville	6	–	12	.333	16	–	17	.485
Indiana State	5	–	13	.278	11	–	20	.355
Drake	5	–	13	.278	7	–	24	.226
† 2017 MVC tournament winner Rankings from AP poll

The 2016–17 Loyola Ramblers men's basketball team represented Loyola University Chicago during the 2016–17 NCAA Division I men's basketball season. The Ramblers, led by sixth-year head coach Porter Moser, played their home games at the Joseph J. Gentile Arena in Chicago, Illinois as members of the Missouri Valley Conference. They finished the season 18–14, 8–10 in MVC play to finish in fifth place. They lost to Southern Illinois in the quarterfinals of the MVC tournament.

== Previous season ==
The Ramblers finished the 2015–16 season 15–17, 7–11 in Missouri Valley play to finish in eighth play. They defeated Bradley in the first round of the Missouri Valley tournament to advance to the quarterfinals where they lost to Wichita State.

== Offseason ==
=== Departures ===
Name	Number	Pos.	Height	Weight	Year	Hometown	Notes
Earl Peterson	2	G	6'3"	180	Senior	Raytown, MO	Graduated
Devon Turk	4	G	6'4"	195	Senior	Houston, TX	Graduated
Pernell Adgei	5	G/F	6'7"	215	Freshman	Dumfries, VA	Transferred to Panola College
Jay Knuth	10	F	6'6"	205	Sophomore	Johnston, IA	Transferred to Minnesota State
Julius Rajala	12	F	6'9"	215	Sophomore	Helsinki, Finland	Transferred to Southern Indiana
Jeff White	23	G	6'1"	185	Senior	Peoria, IL	Graduated
Montel James	24	F	6'7"	220	Senior	Kenner, LA	Graduated
Cal Kennedy	34	F	6'6"	210	RS Sophomore	Oak Lawn, IL	Walk-on; left the team for personal reasons

=== Incoming transfers ===
Name	Number	Pos.	Height	Weight	Year	Hometown	Previous School
Marques Townes	5	G	6'4"	210	Junior	Edison, NJ	Transferred from Fairleigh Dickinson. Under NCAA transfer rules, Townes will have to sit out for the 2016–17 season. Will have two years of remaining eligibility.
Aundre Jackson	24	F	6'5"	230	Junior	Kennedale, TX	Junior college transferred from McLennan CC
Vlatko Granic	32	F	6'9"	230	Junior	Split, Croatia	Junior college transferred from Weatherford College
Treyvon Andres		F	6'7"	230	Junior	Denver, CO	Junior college transferred from Trinidad State Junior College

=== 2016 recruiting class ===
College recruiting information
Name	Hometown	School	Height	Weight	Commit date
Cameron Satterwhite #47 SG	Gibert, AZ	Gilbert Christian High School	6 ft 3 in (1.91 m)	170 lb (77 kg)	Oct 18, 2015
Cameron Satterwhite #47 SG	Recruit ratings: Scout: Rivals: (75)				
Bruno Skokna; SG	Zagrab, Croatia	Košarkaški klub Gorica	6 ft 4 in (1.93 m)	175 lb (79 kg)	Nov 11, 2015
Bruno Skokna; SG	Recruit ratings: Scout: Rivals: (N/A)				
Matt Chastain; SF	Leroy, IL	Leroy High School	6 ft 6 in (1.98 m)	190 lb (86 kg)	Apr 24, 2016
Matt Chastain; SF	Recruit ratings: Scout: Rivals: (N/A)				
Overall recruit ranking: Scout: – Rivals: –
Note: In many cases, Scout, Rivals, 247Sports, On3, and ESPN may conflict in their listings of height and weight.; In these cases, the average was taken. ESPN grades are on a 100-point scale.; Sources: "2016 Team Ranking". Rivals.

== Roster ==
2016–17 Loyola Ramblers men's basketball team
Players
Coaches

Pos.	#	Name	Height	Weight	Year	Previous school	Hometown
G/F	0	Donte Ingram	6 ft 6 in (1.98 m)	215 lb (98 kg)	Jr	Simeon	Chicago, IL
G	1	Glorind Lisha (W)	6 ft 2 in (1.88 m)	185 lb (84 kg)	Sr	Andrew; Lewis	Chicago, IL
G	2	Jake Baughman (W)	6 ft 3 in (1.91 m)	180 lb (82 kg)	Fr	Central Catholic	Bloomington, IL
G	4	Bruno Skokna	6 ft 4 in (1.93 m)	175 lb (79 kg)	Fr	Košarkaški klub Gorica	Zagreb, Croatia
G	5	Marques Townes (I) (redshirt)	6 ft 4 in (1.93 m)	210 lb (95 kg)	Jr	St. Joseph; Fairleigh Dickinson	Edison, NJ
G	13	Clayton Custer	6 ft 1 in (1.85 m)	185 lb (84 kg)	RS So	Blue Valley Northwest; Iowa State	Overland Park, KS
G	14	Ben Richardson	6 ft 3 in (1.91 m)	185 lb (84 kg)	Jr	Blue Valley Northwest	Overland Park, KS
G/F	22	Matt Chastain	6 ft 6 in (1.98 m)	190 lb (86 kg)	Fr	Leroy	Leroy, IL
G	23	Cameron Satterwhite	6 ft 4 in (1.93 m)	175 lb (79 kg)	Fr	Gilbert Christian	Gilbert, AZ
F	24	Aundre Jackson	6 ft 5 in (1.96 m)	230 lb (104 kg)	Jr	Kennedale; McLennan CC	Kennedale, TX
G	25	Tyson Smith	6 ft 2 in (1.88 m)	185 lb (84 kg)	Jr	Westwind Prep; Southern Idaho	Baltimore, MD
G	30	Byron Burt (I) (redshirt)	6 ft 5 in (1.96 m)	190 lb (86 kg)	Jr	Mather; North Park	Chicago, IL
F	31	Maurice Kirby	6 ft 9 in (2.06 m)	240 lb (109 kg)	Jr	Basha; Coffeyville CC	Chandler, AZ
F	32	Vlatko Granic	6 ft 8 in (2.03 m)	230 lb (104 kg)	Jr	Don Bosco; Weatherford College	Split, Croatia
G	35	Milton Doyle	6 ft 4 in (1.93 m)	185 lb (84 kg)	RS Sr	Marshall; Kansas	Chicago, IL

Head coach

- Porter Moser (Creighton)

Assistant coach(es)

- Bennie Seltzer (Washington State)
- Bryan Mullins (Southern Illinois)
- Matt Gordon (Illinois State)

Legend

- (C) Team captain
- (S) Suspended
- (I) Ineligible
- (W) Walk-on
- Injured
- Current redshirt

Roster

== Schedule and results ==
Date time, TV	Rank^{#}	Opponent^{#}	Result	Record	Site (attendance) city, state
Non-conference regular season
11/11/2016*; 7:30 pm, ESPN3		Alcorn State	W 69–44	1–0	Joseph J. Gentile Arena (1,801); Chicago, IL
11/13/2016*; 2:00 pm, ESPN3		IU Northwest	W 100–51	2–0	Joseph J. Gentile Arena; Chicago, IL
11/14/2016*; 7:00 pm, ESPN3		Eureka	W 97–59	3–0	Joseph J. Gentile Arena; Chicago, IL
11/18/2016*; 11:30 am		vs. Saint Joseph's; Paradise Jam quarterfinals	L 57–71	3–1	Sports and Fitness Center (512); St. Thomas, VI
11/19/2016*; 2:30 pm, CBSSN		vs. Oral Roberts; Paradise Jam consolation round	W 78–53	4–1	Sports and Fitness Center (1,831); St. Thomas, VI
11/21/2016*; 2:00 pm		vs. Washington State; Paradise Jam 5th place game	W 88–79	5–1	Sports and Fitness Center (224); St. Thomas, VI
11/26/2016*; 3:00 pm		at NC State; Paradise Jam On Campus Site	L 77–79	5–2	PNC Arena (15,141); Raleigh, NC
11/30/2016*; 7:00 pm, ESPN3		Norfolk State	W 75–62	6–2	Joseph J. Gentile Arena (1,118); Chicago, IL
12/03/2016*; 3:00 pm, ESPN3		San Diego State; MW–MVC Challenge	W 65–59	7–2	Joseph J. Gentile Arena (2,189); Chicago, IL
12/07/2016*; 7:00 pm, ESPN3		Wright State	W 77–64	8–2	Joseph J. Gentile Arena (1,428); Chicago, IL
12/10/2016*; 3:00 pm, CSNC		Milwaukee	L 56–72	9–2	Joseph J. Gentile Arena (1,696); Chicago, IL
12/17/2016*; 3:00 pm, ESPN3		at UIC	W 81–75 ^{OT}	10–2	UIC Pavilion (2,376); Chicago, IL
12/20/2016*; 6:00 pm, ESPN3		at Toledo	L 70–74	10–3	Savage Arena (3,452); Toledo, OH
Missouri Valley regular season
12/29/2016; 7:05 pm, ESPN3		at Drake	L 98–102	10–4 (0–1)	Knapp Center (3,007); Des Moines, IA
01/01/2017; 1:00 pm, ESPN3		Illinois State	L 59–81	10–5 (0–2)	Joseph J. Gentile Arena (1,678); Chicago, IL
01/04/2017; 6:00 pm, CSNC		Northern Iowa	W 77–66	11–5 (1–2)	Joseph J. Gentile Arena (1,269); Chicago, IL
01/07/2017; 7:00 pm, ESPN3		at Bradley	W 78–62	12–5 (2–2)	Carver Arena (5,506); Peoria, IL
01/11/2017; 6:00 pm, CSNC		at Wichita State	L 75–87	12–6 (2–3)	Charles Koch Arena (10,506); Wichita, KS
01/15/2017; 3:00 pm, ESPNU		at Missouri State	W 77–71	13–6 (3–3)	Joseph J. Gentile Arena (1,376); Chicago, IL
01/18/2017; 7:00 pm, CSNC		at Northern Iowa	L 69–72 ^{2OT}	13–7 (3–4)	McLeod Center (3,934); Cedar Falls, IA
01/21/2017; 3:00 pm, CSNC		Evansville	W 67–61	14–7 (4–4)	Joseph J. Gentile Arena (3,006); Chicago, IL
01/25/2017; 7:00 pm, ESPN3		Bradley	W 70–50	15–7 (5–4)	Joseph J. Gentile Arena (2,089); Chicago, IL
01/28/2017; 1:00 pm, ESPN3		at Indiana State	W 81–66	16–7 (6–4)	Hulman Center (4,069); Terre Haute, IN
01/31/2017; 7:05 pm, ESPN3		at Missouri State	L 81–82 ^{OT}	16–8 (6–5)	JQH Arena (4,070); Springfield, MO
02/04/2017; 1:00 pm, CSNC		Southern Illinois	L 61–67	16–9 (6–6)	Joseph J. Gentile Arena (2,315); Chicago, IL
02/08/2017; 7:00 pm, ESPN3		at Evansville	L 58–60	16–10 (6–7)	Ford Center (3,436); Evansville, IN
02/12/2017; 3:00 pm, ESPNU		Wichita State	L 64–81	16–11 (6–8)	Joseph J. Gentile Arena (4,156); Chicago, IL
02/15/2017; 7:00 pm, ESPN3		Indiana State	W 64–46	17–11 (7–8)	Joseph J. Gentile Arena (1,406); Chicago, IL
02/19/2017; 3:00 pm, ESPNU		at Illinois State	L 63–65	17–12 (7–9)	Redbird Arena (8,052); Normal, IL
02/22/2017; 7:00 pm, CSNC+		Drake	W 80–65	18–12 (8–9)	Joseph J. Gentile Arena (2,163); Chicago, IL
02/25/2017; 1:00 pm, ESPN3		at Southern Illinois	L 70–72	18–13 (8–10)	SIU Arena (4,925); Carbondale, IL
Missouri Valley tournament
03/03/2017; 2:35 pm, ESPN3/FSMW/CSNC	(5)	vs. (4) Southern Illinois; Quarterfinals	L 50–55	18–14	Scottrade Center (8,648); St. Louis, MO
*Non-conference game. ^{#}Rankings from Coaches' Poll. (#) Tournament seedings in parentheses. All times are in Central Time.
