= 2016–17 Drake Bulldogs men's basketball team =

American college basketball season

2016–17 Drake Bulldogs men's basketball
- Conference: Missouri Valley Conference
- Record: 7–24 (5–13 MVC)
- Head coach: Ray Giacoletti (8 games); Jeff Rutter (interim)
- Assistant coaches: Dave Buchanan; JR Blount
- Home arena: Knapp Center

2016–17 Missouri Valley Conference men's basketball standings
	Conf.				Overall
Team	W		L	PCT	W		L	PCT
Illinois State	17	–	1	.944	28	–	7	.800
No. 19 Wichita State†	17	–	1	.944	31	–	5	.861
Northern Iowa	9	–	9	.500	14	–	16	.467
Southern Illinois	9	–	9	.500	17	–	16	.515
Loyola Chicago	8	–	10	.444	18	–	14	.563
Missouri State	7	–	11	.389	17	–	16	.515
Bradley	7	–	11	.389	13	–	20	.394
Evansville	6	–	12	.333	16	–	17	.485
Indiana State	5	–	13	.278	11	–	20	.355
Drake	5	–	13	.278	7	–	24	.226
† 2017 MVC tournament winner Rankings from AP poll

The 2016–17 Drake Bulldogs men's basketball team represented Drake University during the 2016–17 NCAA Division I men's basketball season. The Bulldogs were led by interim head coach Jeff Rutter. They played their home games at the Knapp Center in Des Moines, Iowa and were members of the Missouri Valley Conference.

Fourth-year head coach Ray Giacoletti resigned on December 6, 2016, after the first eight games of the season. Assistant coach Jeff Rutter was named interim head coach.

They finished the season 7–24, 5–13 to finish in a tie for ninth place in MVC play. They lost in the first round of the Missouri Valley Conference tournament to Bradley.

Following the season, the school chose not to keep Jeff Rutter as head coach and hired Niko Medved, former head coach at Furman, as the Bulldogs' new head coach.

== Previous season ==
The Bulldogs finished the season 7–24, 2–16 in Missouri Valley play to finish in last place. They lost in the first round of the Missouri Valley tournament to Missouri State.

== Preseason ==
Drake was picked to finish last in the preseason MVC poll.

== Departures ==
Name	Number	Pos.	Height	Weight	Year	Hometown	Notes
Karl Madison	1	G	5'11"	174	RS Senior	Springfield, IL	Graduated
Kale Abrahamson	31	F	6'8"	221	RS Junior	West Des Moines, IA	Graduate transferred to Duquesne
Dominik Olejniczak	44	C	7'0"	249	Freshman	Toruń, Poland	Transferred to Ole Miss

=== Incoming transfers ===
Name	Number	Pos.	Height	Weight	Year	Hometown	Previous School
De'Antae McMurray	4	G	6'1"	185	Junior	Alton, IL	Junior college transferred from Southwestern Illinois College
T.J. Thomas	10	F	6'8"	200	Junior	Lithonia, GA	Junior college transferred from Tyler JC

== Incoming recruits ==
Drake did not have any incoming players in the 2016 recruiting class.

=== Recruiting class of 2017 ===
College recruiting information (2017)
Name	Hometown	School	Height	Weight	Commit date
Teyvion Kirk; PG	Joliet, IL	Joliet West High School	6 ft 1 in (1.85 m)	N/A	
Teyvion Kirk; PG	Recruit ratings: Scout: Rivals: (NR)				
Tai Bibbs; PG	West Chicago, IL	West Chicago Community High School	6 ft 0 in (1.83 m)	N/A	
Tai Bibbs; PG	Recruit ratings: Scout: Rivals: (NR)				
Antonio Pilipovic; SF	Germany	RheinStars Köln	6 ft 6 in (1.98 m)	209 lb (95 kg)	
Antonio Pilipovic; SF	Recruit ratings: Scout: Rivals: (NR)				
Overall recruit ranking:
Note: In many cases, Scout, Rivals, 247Sports, On3, and ESPN may conflict in their listings of height and weight.; In these cases, the average was taken. ESPN grades are on a 100-point scale.; Sources: "2017 Team Ranking". Rivals.

== Roster ==
2016–17 Drake Bulldogs men's basketball team
Players
Coaches

Pos.	#	Name	Height	Weight	Year	Previous school	Hometown
G	0	C. J. Rivers	6 ft 2 in (1.88 m)	187 lb (85 kg)	Jr	Cahokia	Cahokia, IL
F	2	Bill Wampler	6 ft 6 in (1.98 m)	200 lb (91 kg)	So	Regis	Eau Claire, WI
G	3	Graham Woodward	6 ft 0 in (1.83 m)	182 lb (83 kg)	RS Jr	Penn State; Edina HS	Edina, MN
G	4	De'Antae McMurray	6 ft 2 in (1.88 m)	170 lb (77 kg)	Jr	Southwestern Illinois College; Alton HS	Alton, IL
F	10	T. J. Thomas	6 ft 8 in (2.03 m)	205 lb (93 kg)	Jr	Tyler JC; Tucker HS	Stone Mountain, GA
C	11	Jacob Enevold	7 ft 0 in (2.13 m)	246 lb (112 kg)	Sr	Falkonergardens Gymnasium	Lunderskov, Denmark
G	12	Reed Timmer	6 ft 1 in (1.85 m)	185 lb (84 kg)	Jr	Eisenhower	New Berlin, WI
G	14	A. J. Rutter (W)	6 ft 1 in (1.85 m)	180 lb (82 kg)	RS Jr	Gilbert	Ames, IA
G	21	Will Halfon (W)	6 ft 2 in (1.88 m)	200 lb (91 kg)	Fr	Cherry Creek	Greenwood Village, CO
F	22	Casey Schlatter	6 ft 10 in (2.08 m)	207 lb (94 kg)	RS So	Iowa Falls Alden	Iowa Falls, IA
G	23	Ore Arogundade	6 ft 3 in (1.91 m)	185 lb (84 kg)	Jr	St. Viator	Arlington Heights, IL
G	24	Nick Girardi (W)	6 ft 4 in (1.93 m)	180 lb (82 kg)	Fr	Fossil Ridge	Fort Collins, CO
F	25	Johannes Dolven	6 ft 8 in (2.03 m)	230 lb (104 kg)	RS Fr	Wang Videregående	Oslo, Norway
C	32	Kory Kuenstling	6 ft 11 in (2.11 m)	234 lb (106 kg)	RS So	Dunkerton Community School	Dunkerton, IA
F	35	Nick McGlynn	6 ft 8 in (2.03 m)	223 lb (101 kg)	So	Stoughton	Stoughton, WI

Head coach

- Ray Giacoletti (Minot State)

Assistant coach(es)

- Jeff Rutter (Winona State)
- Dave Buchanan (UW–La Crosse)
- JR Blount (Loyola Chicago)

Legend

- (C) Team captain
- (S) Suspended
- (I) Ineligible
- (W) Walk-on
- Injured
- Current redshirt

Roster

== Schedule and results ==
Date time, TV	Rank^{#}	Opponent^{#}	Result	Record	Site (attendance) city, state
Exhibition
11/05/2016*; 5:05 pm, ESPN3		Concordia–St. Paul	W 81–75		Knapp Center (2,224); Des Moines, IA
Non-conference regular season
11/11/2016; 8:35 pm, ESPN3		South Dakota	L 74–79	0–1	Knapp Center (2,439); Des Moines, IA
11/15/2016; 6:35 pm		at UMKC	L 62–68	0–2	Municipal Auditorium (1,535); Kansas City, MO
11/19/2016; 2:05 pm, ESPN3		Simpson	W 76–61	1–2	Knapp Center (2,541); Des Moines, IA
11/24/2016*; 8:30 pm, CBSSN		vs. Iona; Great Alaska Shootout quarterfinals	L 53–64	1–3	Alaska Airlines Center (2,039); Anchorange, AK
11/25/2016*; 5:00 pm		vs. UC Davis; Great Alaska Shootout consolation 2nd round	L 58–64	1–4	Alaska Airlines Center (2,308); Anchorage, AK
11/26/2016*; 3:00 pm		at Alaska Anchorage; Great Alaska Shootout 7th place game	L 69–74	1–5	Alaska Airlines Center (2,030); Anchorage, AK
11/30/2016*; 7:30 pm, FSN		at DePaul	L 75–77	1–6	McGrath-Phillips Arena (2,091); Chicago, IL
12/03/2016*; 2:05 pm, MC22		Fresno State; MW–MVC Challenge	L 76–78 ^{OT}	1–7	Knapp Center (2,633); Des Moines, IA
12/10/2016*; 2:05 pm, MC22		Jackson State	L 63–68	1–8	Knapp Center (2,467); Des Moines, IA
12/17/2016*; 6:00 pm, MC22		vs. Iowa State; Hy-Vee Classic	L 80–97	1–9	Wells Fargo Arena (15,028); Des Moines, IA
12/19/2016*; 7:05 pm, MC22		South Dakota State	L 75–83	1–10	Knapp Center (2,385); Des Moines, IA
12/22/2016*; 7:05 pm, MC22		Mississippi Valley State	W 101–69	2–10	Knapp Center (2,268); Des Moines, IA
Missouri Valley Conference regular season
12/29/2016; 7:05 pm, MC22		Loyola–Chicago	W 102–98	3–10 (1–0)	Knapp Center (3,007); Des Moines, IA
01/01/2017; 4:00 pm, ESPN3		at Southern Illinois	L 69–83	3–11 (1–1)	SIU Arena (4,143); Carbondale, IL
01/04/2017; 7:00 pm, ESPN3		at Wichita State	L 65–90	3–12 (1–2)	Charles Koch Arena (10,383); Wichita, KS
01/08/2017; 3:00 pm, ESPN3		Evansville	W 88–76	4–12 (2–2)	Knapp Center (2,688); Des Moines, IA
01/11/2017; 7:05 pm, MC22		Indiana State	W 87–70	5–12 (3–2)	Knapp Center (2,958); Des Moines, IA
01/15/2017; 3:00 pm, ESPN3		at Northern Iowa	L 60–79	5–13 (3–3)	McLeod Center (4,652); Cedar Falls, IA
01/18/2017; 7:05 pm, MC22/ESPN3		Southern Illinois	W 88–84 ^{OT}	6–13 (4–3)	Knapp Center (2,508); Des Moines, IA
01/21/2017; 7:00 pm, MVC TV		at Illinois State	L 58–72	6–14 (4–4)	Redbird Arena (8,123); Normal, IL
01/24/2017; 7:05 pm, ESPN3		at Missouri State	W 72–71 ^{OT}	7–14 (5–4)	JQH Arena (4,729); Springfield, MO
01/28/2017; 1:00 pm, CBSSN		Northern Iowa	L 63–71	7–15 (5–5)	Knapp Center (5,237); Des Moines, IA
02/01/2017; 6:00 pm, CSNCHI		Wichita State	L 69–77	7–16 (5–6)	Knapp Center (3,024); Des Moines, IA
02/04/2017; 1:00 pm, ESPN3		at Bradley	L 72–79	7–17 (5–7)	Carver Arena (5,815); Peoria, IL
02/07/2017; 7:05 pm, MC22		Illinois State	L 53–82	7–18 (5–8)	Knapp Center (2,812); Des Moines, IA
02/11/2017; 1:00 pm, ESPN3		at Indiana State	L 60–84	7–19 (5–9)	Hulman Center (4,280); Terre Haute, IN
02/14/2017; 7:00 pm, ESPN3		at Evansville	L 70–87	7–20 (5–10)	Ford Center (3,639); Evansville, IN
02/18/2017; 7:05 pm, MVC TV/ESPN3		Missouri State	L 73–76	7–21 (5–11)	Knapp Center (2,818); Des Moines, IA
02/22/2017; 7:00 pm, ESPN3		at Loyola–Chicago	L 65–80	7–22 (5–12)	Joseph J. Gentile Arena (2,163); Chicago, IL
02/25/2017; 1:00 pm, ESPN3		Bradley	L 74–82	7–23 (5–13)	Knapp Center (2,860); Des Moines, IA
Missouri Valley tournament
03/02/2017; 8:35 pm, ESPN3/FSMW/CSNC	(10)	vs. (7) Bradley; First Round	L 58–67	7–24	Scottrade Center (5,057); St. Louis, MO
*Non-conference game. ^{#}Rankings from AP Poll. (#) Tournament seedings in parentheses. All times are in Central Time Source.
