= 2016–17 Illinois State Redbirds men's basketball team =

American college basketball season

2016–17 Illinois State Redbirds men's basketball

MVC Regular Season Co-Champion

NIT, Second Round
- Conference: Missouri Valley Conference
- Record: 28–7 (17–1 MVC)
- Head coach: Dan Muller (5th season)
- Assistant coaches: Luke Yaklich; Dean Oliver; Brian Reese
- Home arena: Doug Collins Court at Redbird Arena

2016–17 Missouri Valley Conference men's basketball standings
	Conf.				Overall
Team	W		L	PCT	W		L	PCT
Illinois State	17	–	1	.944	28	–	7	.800
No. 19 Wichita State†	17	–	1	.944	31	–	5	.861
Northern Iowa	9	–	9	.500	14	–	16	.467
Southern Illinois	9	–	9	.500	17	–	16	.515
Loyola Chicago	8	–	10	.444	18	–	14	.563
Missouri State	7	–	11	.389	17	–	16	.515
Bradley	7	–	11	.389	13	–	20	.394
Evansville	6	–	12	.333	16	–	17	.485
Indiana State	5	–	13	.278	11	–	20	.355
Drake	5	–	13	.278	7	–	24	.226
† 2017 MVC tournament winner Rankings from AP poll

The 2016–17 Illinois State Redbirds men's basketball team represented Illinois State University during the 2016–17 NCAA Division I men's basketball season. The Redbirds, led by fifth-year head coach Dan Muller, played their home games at Redbird Arena in Normal, Illinois as a member of the Missouri Valley Conference. They finished the season 28–7, 17–1 in conference play, to finish in a tie for first place. As the number one seed in the MVC tournament, they defeated Evansville in their quarterfinal game and Southern Illinois in their semifinal game before being beaten by Wichita State in the final.

Although not winning the conference tournament, the Redbirds held the tie-breaker for the regular season title and, as a result, received an automatic bid to the National Invitation Tournament. They were awarded a number one seed where they defeated California–Irvine in their first round game before losing to Central Florida in their second round game.

== Previous season ==
The Redbirds finished the 2015–16 NCAA Division I men's basketball season 18–14, 12–6 in conference play, to finish in a tie for second place. They were the number three seed and were beaten by Indiana State in their quarterfinal game.

== Offseason ==
=== Departures ===
Name	#	Pos.	Height	Weight	Year	Hometown	Comment
Quintin Brewer	2	F	6'8"	215	RS Sr	Atlanta, GA	Graduation
DeVaughn Akoon–Purcell	44	G	6'5"	185	Sr	Orlando, FL	Graduation
Justin McCloud	15	G	6'4"	198	Sr	Bottineau, ND	Graduation
Nick Banyard	0	F	6'8"	225	RS Jr	Flower Mound, TX	Graduation; (graduate transfer Central Florida)
Roland Griffin	35	F	6'7"	210	Fr	Aurora, IL	Midland College
Elvis Harvey	22	F	6'8"	210	Fr	South Bay, FL	Tallahassee Community College

=== Arrivals ===
==== Transfers ====
Name	Pos.	Height	Weight	Year	Hometown	Prior School
D J Clayton	F	6'6"	184	Jr	Oakland, CA	Palm Beach State College
Milik Yarbrough	F	6'6"	230	Jr	Zion, IL	Saint Louis
Phil Fayne	F	6'9"	200	So	Elk Grove, CA	Western Nebraska Community College
Christian Romine	F/C	6'9"	220	So	Mahomet, IL	Texas–El Paso

==== Recruiting class ====
College recruiting information
Name	Hometown	School	Height	Weight	Commit date
Andre Washington; PF	Fort Worth, TX	Arlington Heights High School	6 ft 6 in (1.98 m)	N/A	Aug 18, 2015
Andre Washington; PF	Recruit ratings: Scout: Rivals: 247Sports: (N/A)				
Madison Williams; SG	Augusta, GA	Academy of Richmond County	6 ft 3 in (1.91 m)	170 lb (77 kg)	Jul 28, 2015
Madison Williams; SG	Recruit ratings: Scout: Rivals: 247Sports: (N/A)				
Overall recruit ranking:
Note: In many cases, Scout, Rivals, 247Sports, On3, and ESPN may conflict in their listings of height and weight.; In these cases, the average was taken. ESPN grades are on a 100-point scale.; Sources: "2016 Team Ranking". Rivals.

== Preseason ==
The Redbirds were picked to finish second in the Missouri Valley Conference preseason poll. MiKyle McIntosh and Paris Lee were selected to the All-MVC preseason team.

== Roster ==
2016–17 Illinois State Redbirds men's basketball team
Players
Coaches

Pos.	#	Name	Height	Weight	Year	Previous school	Hometown
G	0	Isaac Gassman (W) (redshirt)	6 ft 5 in (1.96 m)	180 lb (82 kg)	Fr	Ottawa Township High School	Utica, IL
G	1	Paris Lee	6 ft 0 in (1.83 m)	185 lb (84 kg)	Sr	Proviso East High School	Maywood, IL
G	2	D J Clayton	6 ft 6 in (1.98 m)	185 lb (84 kg)	Jr	Elev8 Academy; Western Kentucky; Palm Beach State College	Oakland, CA
G	3	Keyshawn Evans	6 ft 0 in (1.83 m)	180 lb (82 kg)	So	Sagemont School	Plantation, FL
C	4	Daouda Ndaiye	7 ft 0 in (2.13 m)	215 lb (98 kg)	So	Windermere Preparatory School	Dakar, Senegal
G	5	Matt Hein	6 ft 3 in (1.91 m)	185 lb (84 kg)	RS Fr	Windermere Preparatory School	Windermere, FL
F	10	Phil Fayne	6 ft 9 in (2.06 m)	200 lb (91 kg)	So	Franklin High School; Western Nebraska Community College	Elk Grove, CA
F	11	MiKyle McIntosh	6 ft 7 in (2.01 m)	234 lb (106 kg)	RS Jr	22 Feet Academy	Pickering, ON
G	12	Tony Wills	6 ft 4 in (1.93 m)	185 lb (84 kg)	Sr	Ben Davis High School	Indianapolis, IN
F	13	Milik Yarbrough (I)	6 ft 6 in (1.98 m)	230 lb (104 kg)	Jr	Zion–Benton Township High School; Saint Louis	Zion, IL
F	15	Andre Washington	6 ft 8 in (2.03 m)	195 lb (88 kg)	Fr	Arlington Heights High School	Fort Worth, TX
F	23	Deontae Hawkins	6 ft 8 in (2.03 m)	220 lb (100 kg)	RS Jr	Dunbar High School	Dayton, OH
G	25	Madison Williams	6 ft 3 in (1.91 m)	170 lb (77 kg)	Fr	Academy of Richmond County	Augusta, GA
G	31	Javaka Thompson (W)	6 ft 4 in (1.93 m)	191 lb (87 kg)	RS Sr	Whitney Young Magnet High School; Knox College	Chicago, IL
F	34	Christian Romine (I)	6 ft 9 in (2.06 m)	220 lb (100 kg)	So	Mahomet–Seymour High School; Texas–El Paso	Mahomet, IL

Head coach

- Dan Muller (Illinois State)

Assistant coach(es)

- Luke Yaklich (Illinois State)
- Dean Oliver (Iowa)
- Brian Reese (North Carolina)

Legend

- (C) Team captain
- (S) Suspended
- (I) Ineligible
- (W) Walk-on
- Injured
- Current redshirt

Roster
Last update: March 21, 2017

== Schedule and results ==
Date time, TV	Rank^{#}	Opponent^{#}	Result	Record	High points	High rebounds	High assists	Site (attendance) city, state
Exhibition Season
November 6, 2016*; 3:00 pm, ESPN3		Quincy	W 84–62		21 – McIntosh	9 – Washington	4 – Evans	Redbird Arena (3,797); Normal, IL
Non-Conference Regular Season
November 11, 2016*; 7:00 pm, OVC Digital Network		at Murray State	L 70–73	0–1	18 – McIntosh	15 – Hawkins	4 – Tied	CFSB Center (4,321); Murray, KY
November 16, 2016*; 6:00 pm, ESPN3		Fort Wayne	W 75–57	1–1	24 – Hawkins	9 – Clayton	6 – Lee	Redbird Arena (4,081); Normal, IL
November 21, 2016*; 5:00 pm, FSMW/FSSW		at TCU	L 71–80	1–2	20 – McIntosh	9 – McIntosh	7 – Lee	Ed and Rae Schollmaier Arena (5,938); Fort Worth, TX
November 27, 2016*; 3:00 pm, ESPN3		Ferris State	W 81–67	2–2	22 – Fayne	6 – Tied	5 – Lee	Redbird Arena (3,704); Normal, IL
November 30, 2016*; 6:00 pm, ESPN3		IUPUI	W 77–63	3–2	18 – Lee	8 – Clayton	6 – Lee	Redbird Arena (3,717); Normal, IL
December 3, 2016*; 7:00 pm, CSNC+/ESPN3		New Mexico; MW–MVC Challenge	W 79–74	4–2	18 – Lee	10 – Fayne	11 – Lee	Redbird Arena (6,056); Normal, IL
December 7, 2016*; 7:00 pm, ESPN3		at Tulsa	L 68–70	4–3	18 – Lee	7 – McIntosh	6 – Lee	Donald W. Reynolds Center (3,478); Tulsa, OK
December 10, 2016*; 2:00 pm, CSNC+/ESPN3		UT Martin	W 74–57	5–3	12 – Tied	8 – Fayne	5 – Lee	Redbird Arena (4,275); Normal, IL
December 18, 2016*; 3:00 pm, CSNC+/ESPN3		Saint Joseph's	W 81–72	6–3	24 – Lee	8 – Hawkins	4 – Lee	Redbird Arena (3,924); Normal, IL
December 23, 2016*; 12:30 am, ESPN2		at Hawaii; Hawaiian Airlines Diamond Head Classic [Quarterfinal]	W 71–45	7–3	16 – Hawkins	6 – Tied	3 – Lee	Stan Sheriff Center (6,659); Honolulu, HI
December 23, 2016*; 9:00 pm, ESPN2		vs. San Francisco; Hawaiian Airlines Diamond Head Classic [Semifinal]	L 58–66	7–4	20 – McIntosh	12 – McIntosh	4 – Lee	Stan Sheriff Center (6,053); Honolulu, HI
December 25, 2016*; 5:00 pm, ESPN2		vs. Tulsa; Hawaiian Airlines Diamond Head Classic [Third Place]	W 68–56	8–4	18 – Lee	5 – Lee	3 – Tied	Stan Sheriff Center (6,119); Honolulu, HI
Missouri Valley Conference Regular Season
December 29, 2017; 7:00 pm, CSNC+/ESPN3		Evansville	W 62–50	9–4 (1–0)	17 – Fayne	8 – McIntosh	7 – Lee	Redbird Arena (5,415); Normal, IL
January 1, 2017; 1:00 pm, ESPN3		at Loyola–Chicago	W 68–61	10–4 (2–0)	16 – Hawkins	9 – McIntosh	4 – Lee	Joseph J. Gentile Arena (1,678); Chicago, IL
January 4, 2017; 8:00 pm, MVC TV/ESPN3		Missouri State	W 74–71 ^{OT}	11–4 (3–0)	21 – McIntosh	10 – Lee	4 – McIntosh	Redbird Arena (4,107); Normal, IL
January 7, 2017; 1:00 pm, MVC TV/ESPN3		at Indiana State	W 77–58	12–4 (4–0)	31 – McIntosh	11 – Fayne	7 – Lee	Hulman Center (3,641); Terre Haute, IN
January 11, 2017; 7:00 pm, ESPN3		Southern Illinois	W 60–53	13–4 (5–0)	13 – Clayton	8 – Hawkins	4 – Lee	SIU Arena (4,556); Carbondale, IL
January 14, 2017; 7:00 pm, ESPN2		Wichita State	W 76–62	14–4 (6–0)	20 – McIntosh	8 – Tied	6 – Lee	Redbird Arena (9,078); Normal, IL
January 18, 2017; 8:00 pm, CBSSN		at Bradley; I–74 Rivalry	W 69–49	15–4 (7–0)	20 – Hawkins	10 – Tied	5 – Lee	Carver Arena (7,170); Peoria, IL
January 21, 2017; 7:00 pm, MVC TV/ESPN3		Drake	W 72–58	16–4 (8–0)	19 – Hawkins	9 – McIntosh	5 – Lee	Redbird Arena (8,123); Normal, IL
January 25, 2017; 7:00 pm, ESPN3		Indiana State	W 71–66	17–4 (9–0)	19 – Tied	12 – Hawkins	6 – Lee	Redbird Arena (5,738); Normal, IL
January 29, 2017; 3:00 pm, ESPN3		at Evansville	W 69–59	18–4 (10–0)	16 – Fayne	10 – Fayne	6 – Lee	Ford Center (5,428); Evansville, IN
February 1, 2017; 8:00 pm, MVC TV/ESPN3		Northern Iowa	W 57–51	19–4 (11–0)	18 – Lee	10 – Fayne	5 – Lee	Redbird Arena (5,732); Normal, IL
February 4, 2017; 7:00 pm, ESPN2		at Wichita State	L 45–86	19–5 (11–1)	9 – Fayne	8 – Ndaiye	3 – Lee	Charles Koch Arena (10,506); Wichita, KS
February 7, 2017; 7:00 pm, ESPN3		at Drake	W 80–53	20–5 (12–1)	26 – Lee	8 – Fayne	4 – Evans	The Knapp Center (2,812); Des Moines, IA
February 11, 2017; 9:00 pm, ESPNU		Bradley; I–74 Rivalry	W 64–50	21–5 (13–1)	14 – Lee	9 – Ndaiye	4 – Tied	Redbird Arena (9,380); Normal, IL
February 15, 2017; 8:00 pm, MVC TV/ESPN3		at Missouri State	W 67–66	22–5 (14–1)	19 – Hawkins	8 – Fayne	6 – Lee	JQH Arena (3,875); Springfield, MO
February 19, 2017; 3:00 pm, ESPNU		Loyola–Chicago	W 65–63	23–5 (15–1)	16 – Hawkins	11 – Hawkins	9 – Lee	Redbird Arena (8,052); Normal, IL
February 22, 2017; 6:00 pm, MVC TV/ESPN3		Southern Illinois	W 50–46	24–5 (16–1)	16 – Wills	15 – Fayne	3 – Tied	Redbird Arena (6,545); Normal, IL
February 25, 2017; 1:00 pm, CBSSN		at Northern Iowa	W 63–42	25–5 (17–1)	15 – McIntsoh	8 – Lee	4 – Lee	McLeod Center (5,677); Cedar Falls, IA
Missouri Valley Conference Tournament
March 3, 2017*; 12:00 pm, MVC TV/ESPN3	(1)	vs. (8) Evansville; Arch Madness [Quarterfinal]	W 80–69	26–5	19 – Hawkins	5 – Tied	7 – Lee	Scottrade Center (8,648); St. Louis, MO
March 4, 2017*; 2:30 pm, CBSSN	(1)	vs. (4) Southern Illinois; Arch Madness [Semifinal]	W 63–50	27–5	15 – McIntosh	11 – Fayne	5 – Lee	Scottrade Center (12,124); St. Louis, MO
March 5, 2017*; 1:00 pm, CBS	(1)	vs. (2) No. 21 Wichita State; Arch Madness [Final]	L 51–71	27–6	18 – Lee	7 – Tied	2 – Lee	Scottrade Center (11,744); St. Louis, MO
National Invitation Tournament
March 15, 2017; 8:30 pm, ESPNU	(1)	(8) UC Irvine; First Round – Illinois State Bracket	W 85–71	28–6	22 – Hawkins	8 – McIntosh	7 – Lee	Redbird Arena (5,124); Normal, IL
March 20, 2017; 6:00 pm, ESPN	(1)	(4) UCF; Second Round – Illinois State Bracket	L 62–63	28–7	15 – Hawkins	5 – Tied	5 – McIntosh	Redbird Arena (7,984); Normal, IL
*Non-conference game. ^{#}Rankings from AP Poll. (#) Tournament seedings in parentheses. All times are in Central Standard Time.
