= 2016–17 Missouri State Bears basketball team =

American college basketball season

2016–17 Missouri State Bears basketball
- Conference: Missouri Valley Conference
- Record: 17–16 (7–11 MVC)
- Head coach: Paul Lusk (6th season)
- Assistant coaches: Corey Gipson; Matt Sligh; Keith Pickens
- Home arena: JQH Arena

2016–17 Missouri Valley Conference men's basketball standings
	Conf.				Overall
Team	W		L	PCT	W		L	PCT
Illinois State	17	–	1	.944	28	–	7	.800
No. 19 Wichita State†	17	–	1	.944	31	–	5	.861
Northern Iowa	9	–	9	.500	14	–	16	.467
Southern Illinois	9	–	9	.500	17	–	16	.515
Loyola Chicago	8	–	10	.444	18	–	14	.563
Missouri State	7	–	11	.389	17	–	16	.515
Bradley	7	–	11	.389	13	–	20	.394
Evansville	6	–	12	.333	16	–	17	.485
Indiana State	5	–	13	.278	11	–	20	.355
Drake	5	–	13	.278	7	–	24	.226
† 2017 MVC tournament winner Rankings from AP poll

The 2016–17 Missouri State Bears basketball team represented Missouri State University during the 2016–17 NCAA Division I men's basketball season. The Bears, led by sixth-year head coach Paul Lusk, played their home games at JQH Arena in Springfield, Missouri as members of the Missouri Valley Conference. They finished the regular season 17–16, 7–11 in MVC play to finish in a tie for sixth place. As the No. 6 seed in the MVC tournament, they defeated Northern Iowa in the quarterfinals before losing to Wichita State in the semifinals.

== Previous season ==
The Bears finished the 2015–16 season 13–19, 8–10 in Missouri Valley play to finish in a tie for sixth place. They defeated Drake in the first round of the Missouri Valley tournament to advance to the quarterfinals where they lost to Evansville.

== Offseason ==
=== Departures ===
Name	Number	Pos.	Height	Weight	Year	Hometown	Notes
Loomis Gerring	3	F	6'5"	205	Senior	Grandview, MO	Graduated
Dorrian Williams	23	G	6'3"	190	Senior	Oklahoma City, OK	Graduated
Shawn Roundtree	24	G	6'0"	185	Sophomore	Edwardsville, IL	Transferred to Mineral Area College
Camryn Boone	30	F	6'6"	240	Senior	Seattle, WA	Graduated

=== Incoming transfers ===
Name	Number	Pos.	Height	Weight	Year	Hometown	Previous School
Jarrid Rhodes	10	F	6'7"	180	Junior	Palmetto, FL	Junior college transferred from Northern Oklahoma College
Ronnie Rousseau III	14	G	5'10"	160	Junior	Cincinnati, OH	Junior college transferred from State Fair CC
Alize Johnson	24	F	6'8"	200	Junior	Williamsport, PA	Junior college transferred from Frank Phillips College

=== 2016 recruiting class ===
College recruiting information
Name	Hometown	School	Height	Weight	Commit date
Greg Williams #49 PG	Houston, TX	Genesis Academy	6 ft 6 in (1.98 m)	185 lb (84 kg)	Nov 2, 2015
Greg Williams #49 PG	Recruit ratings: Scout: Rivals: (73)				
Overall recruit ranking:
Note: In many cases, Scout, Rivals, 247Sports, On3, and ESPN may conflict in their listings of height and weight.; In these cases, the average was taken. ESPN grades are on a 100-point scale.; Sources: "2016 Team Ranking". Rivals.

== Roster ==
2016–17 Missouri State Bears men's basketball team
Players
Coaches

Pos.	#	Name	Height	Weight	Year	Previous school	Hometown
F	0	Jordan Martin	6 ft 8 in (2.03 m)	235 lb (107 kg)	Sr	Central; John A. Logan College	St. Louis, MO
F	1	Robin Thompson	6 ft 6 in (1.98 m)	224 lb (102 kg)	RS So	MICDS	St. Louis, MO
G	4	Dequon Miller	5 ft 10 in (1.78 m)	176 lb (80 kg)	Sr	Capital; Motlow State CC	Charleston, WV
F	5	Onediah Church	6 ft 8 in (2.03 m)	217 lb (98 kg)	So	Springfield	Springfield, IL
F	10	Jarrid Rhodes	6 ft 6 in (1.98 m)	174 lb (79 kg)	Jr	Palmetto; Northern Oklahoma College	Palmetto, FL
G	11	Jarred Dixon	6 ft 3 in (1.91 m)	167 lb (76 kg)	So	Lee's Summit West	Kansas City, MO
G	14	Ronnie Rousseau	5 ft 10 in (1.78 m)	153 lb (69 kg)	Jr	Winton Woods; State Fair CC	Cincinnati, OH
G	15	Austin Ruder	6 ft 3 in (1.91 m)	199 lb (90 kg)	Sr	Nixa	Nixa, MO
G	20	Ryan Kreklow	6 ft 4 in (1.93 m)	181 lb (82 kg)	So	Rock Bridge	Columbia, MO
F	24	Alize Johnson	6 ft 9 in (2.06 m)	201 lb (91 kg)	Jr	St. John Neumann; Frank Phillips College	Williamsport, PA
F	33	Chris Kendrix	6 ft 5 in (1.96 m)	185 lb (84 kg)	Jr	Willard HS	Willard, MO
C	50	Tyler McCullough	6 ft 11 in (2.11 m)	252 lb (114 kg)	Sr	Fayetteville HS	Fayetteville, AR

Head coach

- Paul Lusk (Southern Illinois)

Assistant coach(es)

- Corey Gipson (Austin Peay)
- Matt Sligh (Covenant College)
- Keith Pickens (Missouri State)

Legend

- (C) Team captain
- (S) Suspended
- (I) Ineligible
- (W) Walk-on
- Injured
- Current redshirt

Roster

== Schedule and results ==
Date time, TV	Rank^{#}	Opponent^{#}	Result	Record	Site (attendance) city, state
Exhibition
11/05/2016*; 7:05 pm		Missouri Baptist	W 93–72		JQH Arena (2,737); Springfield, MO
Non-conference regular season
11/11/2016*; 7:05 pm		Alabama A&M	W 96–62	1–0	JQH Arena (3,502); Springfield, MO
11/13/2016*; 1:05 pm		Jacksonville State	W 91–65	2–0	JQH Arena (3,330); Springfield, MO
11/17/2016*; 7:05 pm		Fontbonne	W 100–27	3–0	JQH Arena (3,121); Springfield, MO
11/23/2016*; 7:00 pm, FSN		at DePaul	L 66–68	3–1	Allstate Arena (4,387); Rosemont, IL
11/27/2016*; 3:05 pm, ESPN3		North Dakota State	W 64–50	4–1	JQH Arena (3,765); Springfield, MO
12/03/2016*; 8:00 pm		at Air Force; MW–MWC Challenge	L 70–83	4–2	Clune Arena (1,986); Colorado Springs, CO
12/07/2016*; 7:00 pm, ESPN3		at Southeast Missouri State	W 79–71	5–2	Show Me Center (1,556); Cape Girardeau, MO
12/10/2016*; 7:05 pm, ESPN3		Valparaiso	L 81–84	5–3	JQH Arena (6,147); Springfield, MO
12/14/2016*; 7:05 pm, ESPN3		Oral Roberts	W 86–76	6–3	JQH Arena (3,723); Springfield, MO
12/17/2016*; 5:05 pm		Southeast Missouri State; Las Vegas Classic	W 71–66	7–3	JQH Arena (2,384); Springfield, MO
12/19/2016*; 8:35 pm, ESPN3		Chicago State; Las Vegas Classic	W 66–46	8–3	JQH Arena (3,146); Springfield, MO
12/22/2016*; 9:30 pm, FS1		vs. No. 23 USC; Las Vegas Classic semifinals	L 75–83	8–4	Orleans Arena; Paradise, NV
12/23/2016*; 7:30 pm, FS1		vs. DePaul; Las Vegas Classic	W 69–58	9–4	Orleans Arena; Paradise, NV
Missouri Valley Conference regular season
12/28/2016; 8:00 pm, FSMW		at Northern Iowa	W 68–64	10–4 (1–0)	McLeod Center (5,448); Cedar Falls, IA
12/31/2016; 11:00 am, FSMW		Indiana State	W 81–75 ^{OT}	11–4 (2–0)	JQH Arena (4,400); Springfield, MO
01/04/2017; 8:00 pm, FSMW		at Illinois State	L 71–74 ^{OT}	11–5 (2–1)	Redbird Arena (4,107); Normal, IL
01/07/2017; 3:00 pm, CBSSN		Southern Illinois	L 67–75	11–6 (2–2)	JQH Arena (5,892); Springfield, MO
01/11/2017; 7:05 pm, ESPN3		Evansville	W 55–51	12–6 (3–2)	JQH Arena (3,235); Springfield, MO
01/15/2017; 3:00 pm, ESPNU		at Loyola–Chicago	L 71–77	12–7 (3–3)	Joseph J. Gentile Arena (1,376); Chicago, IL
01/18/2017; 6:00 pm, ESPN3		at Indiana State	W 73–68	13–7 (4–3)	Hulman Center (3,875); Terre Haute, IN
01/21/2017; 2:05 pm, ESPN3		Bradley	W 76–62	14–7 (5–3)	JQH Arena (4,854); Springfield, MO
01/24/2017; 7:05 pm		Drake	L 71–72 ^{OT}	14–8 (5–4)	JQH Arena (4,729); Springfield, MO
01/28/2017; 7:00 pm, FSMW		at Southern Illinois	L 84–85 ^{OT}	14–9 (5–5)	SIU Arena (4,518); Carbondale, IL
01/31/2017; 7:05 pm		Loyola–Chicago	W 82–81 ^{OT}	15–9 (6–5)	JQH Arena (4,070); Springfield, MO
02/04/2017; 3:00 pm		at Evansville	L 66–74	15–10 (6–6)	Ford Center (4,467); Evansville, IN
02/09/2017; 8:00 pm, CBSSN		at Wichita State	L 62–80	15–11 (6–7)	Charles Koch Arena (10,506); Wichita, KS
02/12/2017; 3:00 pm, ESPN3		Northern Iowa	L 52–55	15–12 (6–8)	JQH Arena (4,165); Springfield, MO
02/15/2017; 8:00 pm, FSMW/CSNC/ESPN3		Illinois State	L 66–67	15–13 (6–9)	JQH Arena (3,875); Springfield, MO
02/18/2017; 7:00 pm, FSMW		at Drake	W 76–73	16–13 (7–9)	Knapp Center (2,818); Des Moines, IA
02/22/2017; 7:05 pm, ESPN3		at Bradley	L 68–77	16–14 (7–10)	Carver Arena (5,474); Peoria, IL
02/25/2017; 11:00 am, ESPN2		No. 25 Wichita State	L 67–86	16–15 (7–11)	JQH Arena (6,823); Springfield, MO
Missouri Valley tournament
03/03/2017; 8:35 pm, ESPN3/FSMW/CSNC	(6)	vs. (3) Northern Iowa; Quarterfinals	W 70–64	17–15	Scottrade Center (9,124); St. Louis, MO
03/04/2017; 5:00 pm, CBSSN	(6)	vs. (2) No. 21 Wichita State; Semifinals	L 63–78	17–16	Scottrade Center (12,124); St. Louis, MO
*Non-conference game. ^{#}Rankings from AP Poll. (#) Tournament seedings in parentheses. All times are in Central Time Source.
