= 2016–17 Bradley Braves men's basketball team =

American college basketball season

2016–17 Bradley Braves men's basketball
- Conference: Missouri Valley Conference
- Record: 13–20 (7–11 MVC)
- Head coach: Brian Wardle (2nd season)
- Assistant coaches: Drew Adams; Mike Bargen; Jimmie Foster
- Home arena: Carver Arena

2016–17 Missouri Valley Conference men's basketball standings
	Conf.				Overall
Team	W		L	PCT	W		L	PCT
Illinois State	17	–	1	.944	28	–	7	.800
No. 19 Wichita State†	17	–	1	.944	31	–	5	.861
Northern Iowa	9	–	9	.500	14	–	16	.467
Southern Illinois	9	–	9	.500	17	–	16	.515
Loyola Chicago	8	–	10	.444	18	–	14	.563
Missouri State	7	–	11	.389	17	–	16	.515
Bradley	7	–	11	.389	13	–	20	.394
Evansville	6	–	12	.333	16	–	17	.485
Indiana State	5	–	13	.278	11	–	20	.355
Drake	5	–	13	.278	7	–	24	.226
† 2017 MVC tournament winner Rankings from AP poll

The 2016–17 Bradley Braves men's basketball team represented Bradley University during the 2016–17 NCAA Division I men's basketball season. The Braves, led by second-year head coach Brian Wardle, played their home games at Carver Arena in Peoria, Illinois as members of the Missouri Valley Conference. They finished the season 13–20, 7–11 in MVC play to finish in a tie for sixth place. As the No. 7 seed in the MVC tournament, they defeated Drake in the first round before losing to Wichita State in the quarterfinals.

== Previous season ==
The Braves finished the 2015–16 season 5–27, 3–15 in Missouri Valley play to finish in ninth place. They lost in the first round of the Missouri Valley tournament to Loyola–Chicago.

== Preseason ==
The Missouri Valley Conference's preseason poll picked Bradley to finish in eighth place in the MVC.

== Offseason ==
=== Departures ===
Name	Number	Pos.	Height	Weight	Year	Hometown	Notes
Ka'Darryl Bell	0	G	6'1"	200	Senior	Chicago, IL	Graduated
Anthony Fields	3	G	6'0"	160	RS Senior	Detroit, MI	Graduated
Joel Okafor	4	G	5'11"	175	Freshman	Richmond, IN	Transferred to Indiana Wesleyan
Davante Cooper	5	C	6'10"	215	Freshman	Atlanta, GA	Transferred to Tyler JC
Jackson Kane	10	G	5'10"	175	Senior	Roseville, IL	Walk-on; graduated
Scottie James	24	F	6'8"	215	Freshman	Tarpon Springs, FL	Transferred to Liberty
Mike Shaw	32	F	6'8"	230	RS Senior	Chicago, IL	Graduated

=== Incoming transfers ===
Name	Number	Pos.	Height	Weight	Year	Hometown	Previous School
JoJo McGlaston	24	G	6'3"	180	RS Junior	Dublin, CA	Junior college transferred from Diablo Valley College

=== 2016 recruiting class ===
College recruiting information
Name	Hometown	School	Height	Weight	Commit date
Koch Bar; C	Jacksonville, FL	Arlington Country Day School	6 ft 9 in (2.06 m)	220 lb (100 kg)	Jul 2, 2015
Koch Bar; C	Recruit ratings: Scout: Rivals: (76)				
Jayden Hodgson; PG	Gosford, Australia	Centre of Excellence	6 ft 1 in (1.85 m)	N/A	Nov 30, 2015
Jayden Hodgson; PG	Recruit ratings: Scout: Rivals: (NG)				
Nate Kennell; SG	Metamora, IL	Metamora Township High School	6 ft 5 in (1.96 m)	N/A	Jul 1, 2015
Nate Kennell; SG	Recruit ratings: Scout: Rivals: (NG)				
Darrell Brown Jr. PG	Memphis, TN	Germantown High School	6 ft 0 in (1.83 m)	160 lb (73 kg)	Feb 7, 2016
Darrell Brown Jr. PG	Recruit ratings: Scout: Rivals: (NG)				
Overall recruit ranking: Scout: – Rivals: –
Note: In many cases, Scout, Rivals, 247Sports, On3, and ESPN may conflict in their listings of height and weight.; In these cases, the average was taken. ESPN grades are on a 100-point scale.; Sources: "Bradley Commit List for 2016". Rivals.; "Men's Basketball Recruiting". Scout.; "ESPN – Bradley Braves Basketball Recruiting 2016". ESPN.; "Scout.com Team Recruiting Rankings". Scout.; "2016 Team Ranking". Rivals.

=== 2017 Recruiting class ===
College recruiting information (2017)
Name	Hometown	School	Height	Weight	Commit date
Ryan Stipanovich; SF	Saint Louis, MO	De Smet Jesuit High School	6 ft 5 in (1.96 m)	180 lb (82 kg)	Aug 16, 2016
Ryan Stipanovich; SF	Recruit ratings: Scout: Rivals: (NR)				
Overall recruit ranking: Scout: – Rivals: –
Note: In many cases, Scout, Rivals, 247Sports, On3, and ESPN may conflict in their listings of height and weight.; In these cases, the average was taken. ESPN grades are on a 100-point scale.; Sources: "Bradley Commit List for 2017". Rivals.; "Men's Basketball Recruiting". Scout.; "ESPN – Bradley Braves Basketball Recruiting 2017". ESPN.; "Scout.com Team Recruiting Rankings". Scout.; "2017 Team Ranking". Rivals.

== Roster ==
2016–17 Bradley Braves men's basketball team
Players
Coaches

Pos.	#	Name	Height	Weight	Year	Previous school	Hometown
G	0	Lou Griffith (W)	5 ft 9 in (1.75 m)	155 lb (70 kg)	Fr	Washington Community HS	Washington, IL
F	1	Donte Thomas	6 ft 7 in (2.01 m)	225 lb (102 kg)	Jr	Thornwood HS	Calumet City, IL
G	2	Ronnie Suggs	6 ft 6 in (1.98 m)	190 lb (86 kg)	So	Vermont Academy	Washington, MO
G	3	Antoine Pittman	6 ft 3 in (1.91 m)	210 lb (95 kg)	So	Auburn HS	Rockford, IL
G	10	Darrell Brown	5 ft 10 in (1.78 m)	175 lb (79 kg)	Fr	Germantown HS	Memphis, TN
C	12	Koch Bar	6 ft 10 in (2.08 m)	225 lb (102 kg)	Fr	Arlington County Day School, FL	Abyei, South Sudan
F	13	Luuk van Bree	6 ft 9 in (2.06 m)	220 lb (100 kg)	So	Canarias Basketball Academy	Venray, Netherlands
F	14	Peter Hanley (W)	6 ft 7 in (2.01 m)	215 lb (98 kg)	So	Notre Dame HS	Peoria, IL
F	20	Jerome Merritt	6 ft 5 in (1.96 m)	210 lb (95 kg)	Fr	Oldsmar Christian School	Hudson, FL
G	23	Dwayne Lautier-Ogunleye	6 ft 3 in (1.91 m)	205 lb (93 kg)	So	Bristol Academy Flyers	London, England
G/F	24	JoJo McGlaston	6 ft 5 in (1.96 m)	205 lb (93 kg)	RS Jr	Dublin HS; Diablo Valley College	Dublin, CA
G	25	Nate Kennell	6 ft 6 in (1.98 m)	195 lb (88 kg)	Fr	Metamora Township HS	Metamora, IL
F	30	Callum Barker	6 ft 9 in (2.06 m)	230 lb (104 kg)	So	Notre Dame Prep	Hobart, Australia
F	34	Alex Foster	6 ft 8 in (2.03 m)	230 lb (104 kg)	RS Jr	Seton Academy; Texas Tech	Joliet, IL
G	35	Jayden Hodgson	6 ft 3 in (1.91 m)	185 lb (84 kg)	Fr	UCSSC Lake Ginninderra	Gosford, Australia

Head coach

- Brian Wardle (Marquette)

Assistant coach(es)

- Drew Adams (Tennessee)
- Mike Bargen (Marquette)
- Jimmie Foster (South Dakota)

Legend

- (C) Team captain
- (S) Suspended
- (I) Ineligible
- (W) Walk-on
- Injured
- Current redshirt

Roster

== Schedule and results ==
Date time, TV	Rank^{#}	Opponent^{#}	Result	Record	Site (attendance) city, state
Exhibition
Nov 6, 2016*; 2:00 pm		Wisconsin-La Crosse	W 83–66		Carver Arena (4,682); Peoria, IL
Non-conference regular season
Nov. 11, 2016*; 7:00 pm, ESPN3		Illinois-Springfield; Gulf Coast Showcase Opening game	W 70–55	1–0	Carver Arena (5,176); Peoria, IL
Nov. 13, 2016*; 4:00 pm, ESPN3		Delaware	L 49–63	1–1	Carver Arena (4,897); Peoria, IL
Nov 18, 2016*; 7:00 pm, ESPN3		Southeast Missouri State	W 84–78	2–1	Carver Arena (5,142); Peoria, IL
Nov 21, 2016*; 12:30 pm		vs. Hofstra; Gulf Coast Showcase	L 90–92	2–2	Germain Arena; Estero, FL
Nov 22, 2016*; 10:00 am		vs. Wofford; Gulf Coast Showcase	W 70–62	3–2	Germain Arena; Estero, FL
Nov 23, 2016*; 12:30 pm		vs. George Mason; Gulf Coast Showcase	L 66–77	3–3	Germain Arena; Estero, FL
Nov 29, 2016*; 7:00 pm, WEIU-TV		at Eastern Illinois	W 87–83 ^{OT}	4–3	Lantz Arena; Charleston, IL
Dec 3, 2016*; 7:00 pm, CSN+/ESPN3		Nevada; MW–MVC Challenge	L 69–91	4–4	Carver Arena (5,384); Peoria, IL
Dec 6, 2016*; 6:00 pm		at Ball State	L 63–80	4–5	Worthen Arena (2,477); Muncie, IN
Dec 10, 2016*; 8:00 pm, ESPN3		Chicago State	W 83–48	5–5	Carver Arena (4,943); Peoria, IL
Dec 16, 2016*; 7:00 pm, ESPN3		Texas–Arlington	L 51–56	5–6	Carver Arena (4,711); Peoria, IL
Dec 19, 2016*; 8:00 pm, SECN		at Ole Miss	L 49–66	5–7	The Pavilion at Ole Miss (7,792); Oxford, MS
Dec 21, 2016*; 8:00 pm, FSN		at TCU	L 42–74	5–8	Schollmaier Arena (6,258); Fort Worth, TX
Missouri Valley Conference regular season
Dec 29, 2016; 7:00 pm, ESPN3		Southern Illinois	W 60–51	6–8 (1–0)	Carver Arena (5,989); Peoria, IL
Jan 1, 2017; 1:00 pm, ESPN3		at Wichita State	L 66–100	6–9 (1–1)	Charles Koch Arena (10,506); Wichita, KS
Jan 4, 2017; 7:00 pm, ESPN3		at Evansville	W 74–63	7–9 (2–1)	Ford Center (3,614); Evansville, IN
Jan 7, 2017; 7:00 pm, ESPN3		Loyola–Chicago	L 62–78	7–10 (2–2)	Carver Arena (5,506); Peoria, IL
Jan 11, 2017; 8:00 pm, MVC-TV		Northern Iowa	W 72–61	8–10 (3–2)	Carver Arena (5,138); Peoria, IL
Jan 14, 2017; 12:00 pm, ESPN3		at Indiana State	L 71–81	8–11 (3–3)	Hulman Center (3,969); Terre Haute, IN
Jan 18, 2017; 8:00 pm, CBSSN		Illinois State; I-74 Rivalry	L 49–69	8–12 (3–4)	Carver Arena (7,170); Peoria, IL
Jan 21, 2017; 2:00 pm, ESPN3		at Missouri State	L 62–76	8–13 (3–5)	JQH Arena (4,854); Springfield, MO
Jan 25, 2017; 7:00 pm, ESPN3		at Loyola–Chicago	L 50–70	8–14 (3–6)	Joseph J. Gentile Arena (2,089); Chicago, IL
Jan 29, 2017; 3:00 pm, ESPNU		Wichita State	L 49–64	8–15 (3–7)	Carver Arena (6,001); Peoria, IL
Feb 1, 2017; 7:00 pm, ESPN3		at Southern Illinois	L 65–85	8–16 (3–8)	SIU Arena (4,689); Carbondale, IL
Feb 4, 2017; 1:00 pm, ESPN3		Drake	W 79–72	9–16 (4–8)	Carver Arena (5,815); Peoria, IL
Feb 8, 2017; 8:00 pm, MVC-TV		Indiana State	L 54–56	9–17 (4–9)	Carver Arena (5,004); Peoria, IL
Feb 11, 2017; 9:00 pm, ESPNU		at Illinois State	L 50–64	9–18 (4–10)	Redbird Arena (9,380); Bloomington, IL
Feb 15, 2017; 7:00 pm, ESPN3		at Northern Iowa	L 61–64	9–19 (4–11)	McLeod Center (4,225); Cedar Falls, IA
Feb 18, 2017; 1:00 pm, ESPN3		Evansville	W 84–72	10–19 (5–11)	Carver Arena (5,968); Peoria, IL
Feb 22, 2017; 7:00 pm, ESPN3		Missouri State	W 77–68	11–19 (6–11)	Carver Arena (5,474); Peoria, IL
Feb 25, 2017; 1:00 pm, ESPN3		at Drake	W 82–74	12–19 (7–11)	Knapp Center (7,152); Des Moines, IA
Missouri Valley tournament
Mar 2, 2017; 8:25 pm, ESPN3/FSMW/CSNC	(7)	vs. (10) Drake; First Round	W 67–58	13–19	Scottrade Center (5,057); St. Louis, MO
03/03/2017; 6:00 pm, ESPN3/FSMW/CSNC	(7)	vs. (2) No. 21 Wichita State; Quarterfinals	L 56–82	13–20	Scottrade Center (9,124); St. Louis, MO
*Non-conference game. ^{#}Rankings from AP Poll. (#) Tournament seedings in parentheses. All times are in Central Time.
