= 2016–17 Indiana State Sycamores men's basketball team =

American college basketball season

2016–17 Indiana State Sycamores men's basketball
- Conference: Missouri Valley Conference
- Record: 11–20 (5–13 MVC)
- Head coach: Greg Lansing (7th season)
- Assistant coaches: Lou Gudino; Marcus Belcher; Terry Parker
- Home arena: Hulman Center

2016–17 Missouri Valley Conference men's basketball standings
| | Conf. | | | | Overall |
| Team | W | | L | PCT | W | | L | PCT |
|---|---|---|---|---|---|---|---|---|
| Illinois State | 17 | – | 1 | .944 | 28 | – | 7 | .800 |
| No. 19 Wichita State† | 17 | – | 1 | .944 | 31 | – | 5 | .861 |
| Northern Iowa | 9 | – | 9 | .500 | 14 | – | 16 | .467 |
| Southern Illinois | 9 | – | 9 | .500 | 17 | – | 16 | .515 |
| Loyola Chicago | 8 | – | 10 | .444 | 18 | – | 14 | .563 |
| Missouri State | 7 | – | 11 | .389 | 17 | – | 16 | .515 |
| Bradley | 7 | – | 11 | .389 | 13 | – | 20 | .394 |
| Evansville | 6 | – | 12 | .333 | 16 | – | 17 | .485 |
| Indiana State | 5 | – | 13 | .278 | 11 | – | 20 | .355 |
| Drake | 5 | – | 13 | .278 | 7 | – | 24 | .226 |
† 2017 MVC tournament winner Rankings from AP poll

The 2016–17 Indiana State Sycamores basketball team represented Indiana State University during the 2016–17 NCAA Division I men's basketball season. The Sycamores, led by seventh-year head coach Greg Lansing, played their home games at the Hulman Center in Terre Haute, Indiana and were members of the Missouri Valley Conference. They finished the season 11–20, 5–13 to finish in a tie for ninth place in MVC play. They lost in the first round of the Missouri Valley Conference tournament to Evansville.

== Previous season ==
The Sycamores finished the 2015–16 season 15–17, 8–10 in MVC play to finish in a tie for sixth place. They defeated Illinois State in the quarterfinals of the Missouri Valley tournament to advance to the semifinals where they lost to Evansville.

== Preseason ==
The Sycamores were picked to finish third in the preseason MVC poll. Brenton Scott was selected to the preseason's All-MVC team.

== Offseason ==
=== Departures ===
| Name | Number | Pos. | Height | Weight | Year | Hometown | Notes |
|---|---|---|---|---|---|---|---|
| Kristian Smith | 1 | G/F | 6'6" | 200 | Senior | Indianapolis, IN | Graduated |
| Kalen Alexander | 10 | G | 6'3" | 169 | Junior | Terre Haute, IN | Walk-on; left the team for personal reasons |
| Devonte Brown | 11 | G | 6'2" | 195 | Senior | Killeen, TX | Graduated |
| Grant Prusator | 20 | G | 6'0" | 171 | Junior | Rochelle, IL | Transferred to Arkansas Tech |
| Brandon Burnett | 22 | G | 6'6" | 232 | Senior | Tucson, AZ | Graduated |
| Nick Amor | 24 | G/F | 6'4" | 187 | Junior | Lakeville, IN | Walk-on; left the team for personal reasons |

=== Incoming transfers ===
| Name | Number | Pos. | Height | Weight | Year | Hometown | Previous School |
|---|---|---|---|---|---|---|---|
| Demonte Ojinnaka | 1 | G | 6'5" | 215 | Junior | Silver Spring, MD | Junior college transfer from Cloud County CC |
| Donovan Franklin | 13 | G | 6'5" | 175 | Sophomore | O'Fallon, IL | Junior college transfer from Gulf Coast State College |

=== 2016 recruiting class ===
College recruiting information
| Name | Hometown | School | Height | Weight | Commit date |
|---|---|---|---|---|---|
| Jordan Barnes; PG | Saint Louis, MO | Christian Brothers College High School | 5 ft 11 in (1.80 m) | 160 lb (73 kg) | Jul 19, 2015 |
| Jordan Barnes; PG | Recruit ratings: Scout: Rivals: (74) | | | | |
Overall recruit ranking:
Note: In many cases, Scout, Rivals, 247Sports, On3, and ESPN may conflict in their listings of height and weight.; In these cases, the average was taken. ESPN grades are on a 100-point scale.; Sources: "2016 Team Ranking". Rivals.

== Roster ==
2016–17 Indiana State Sycamores men's basketball team
Players
Coaches

| Pos. | # | Name | Height | Weight | Year | Previous school | Hometown |
|---|---|---|---|---|---|---|---|
| G | 0 | Everett Clemons | 6 ft 1 in (1.85 m) | 185 lb (84 kg) | Sr | Vincennes; Lanphier HS | Springfield, IL |
| G | 1 | Demonte Ojinnaka | 6 ft 5 in (1.96 m) | 215 lb (98 kg) | Jr | Blake HS; Cloud County CC | Silver Spring, MD |
| G | 2 | Jordan Barnes | 5 ft 11 in (1.8 m) | 160 lb (73 kg) | Fr | Christian Brothers HS | St. Louis, MO |
| G | 3 | Trey Knight III | 6 ft 4 in (1.93 m) | 185 lb (84 kg) | RS Fr | Cedar Park HS | Cedar Park, TX |
| G | 4 | Brenton Scott | 6 ft 1 in (1.85 m) | 195 lb (88 kg) | RS Jr | Northrop HS | Fort Wayne, IN |
| F | 5 | Bronson Kessinger | 6 ft 8 in (2.03 m) | 230 lb (104 kg) | RS Fr | Corydon Central HS | Corydon, IN |
| F | 10 | Ethan Claycomb (W) | 6 ft 7 in (2.01 m) | 195 lb (88 kg) | Fr | Lincoln HS | Vincennes, IN |
| F | 12 | Niels Bunschoten | 6 ft 9 in (2.06 m) | 225 lb (102 kg) | Sr | Howard College | Bussum, Netherlands |
| G | 13 | Donovan Franklin | 6 ft 5 in (1.96 m) | 195 lb (88 kg) | So | O'Fallon HS; Gulf Coast State | St. Louis, MO |
| G | 24 | Matt Deady (W) | 6 ft 5 in (1.96 m) | 175 lb (79 kg) | Fr | South Vigo HS | Terre Haute, IN |
| F | 30 | Matt Van Scyoc | 6 ft 6 in (1.98 m) | 216 lb (98 kg) | RS Sr | The Citadel; Green Lake HS | Green Lake, WI |
| G | 32 | Laquarious Paige | 6 ft 3 in (1.91 m) | 180 lb (82 kg) | Jr | Stark HS | West Orange, TX |
| F/C | 34 | Brandon Murphy | 6 ft 7 in (2.01 m) | 275 lb (125 kg) | Jr | Carver HS | Montgomery, AL |
| F/C | 41 | Emondre Richman | 6 ft 9 in (2.06 m) | 250 lb (113 kg) | So | Collinsville HS | Collinsville, IL |
| C | 42 | T. J. Bell | 6 ft 8 in (2.03 m) | 250 lb (113 kg) | Sr | Charleston HS | Charleston, IL |

Head coach

- Greg Lansing (South Dakota)

Assistant coach(es)

- Lou Gudino (Indiana)
- Marcus Belcher (Southern Illinois)
- Terry Parker (Louisiana Tech)

Legend

- (C) Team captain
- (S) Suspended
- (I) Ineligible
- (W) Walk-on
- Injured
- Current redshirt

Roster

== Schedule and results ==
| Date time, TV | Rank^{#} | Opponent^{#} | Result | Record | Site (attendance) city, state |
Exhibition
| 11/03/2016*; 7:00 pm | | Rose-Hulman | W 95–36 | | Hulman Center (3,321); Terre Haute, IN |
Non-conference regular season
| 11/11/2016*; 8:00 pm, ESPN3 | | at Northern Illinois | L 78–80 ^{OT} | 0–1 | Convocation Center (1,565); DeKalb, IL |
| 11/15/2016*; 7:00 pm, ESPN3 | | at Ball State | W 80–74 ^{OT} | 1–1 | John E. Worthen Arena (3,845); Muncie, IN |
| 11/19/2016*; 6:00 pm | | Missouri–St. Louis | W 96–55 | 2–1 | Hulman Center (3,141); Terre Haute, IN |
| 11/24/2016*; 12:30 pm, ESPN2 | | vs. No. 21 Iowa State; AdvoCare Invitational Quarterfinals | L 71–73 | 2–2 | HP Field House (2,436); Lake Buena Vista, FL |
| 11/25/2016*; 1:30 pm, ESPN3 | | vs. Stanford; AdvoCare Invitational | L 62–65 | 2–3 | HP Field House (1,876); Lake Buena Vista, FL |
| 11/27/2016*; 11:00 am, ESPNU | | vs. Quinnipiac; AdvoCare Invitational | L 77–80 | 2–4 | HP Field House; Lake Buena Vista, FL |
| 11/30/2016*; 8:00 pm, ESPN3 | | Northern Illinois | W 63–52 | 3–4 | Hulman Center (3,730); Terre Haute, IN |
| 12/03/2016*; 9:00 pm, ESPN3 | | at Utah State; MW–MWC Challenge | W 62–61 | 4–4 | Smith Spectrum (7,064); Logan, UT |
| 12/07/2016*; 6:00 pm, ESPN3 | | No. 16 Butler | W 72–71 | 5–4 | Hulman Center (5,559); Terre Haute, IN |
| 12/11/2016*; 4:30 pm, ESPN3 | | Western Kentucky | L 59–77 | 5–5 | Hulman Center (3,345); Terre Haute, IN |
| 12/17/2016*; 8:00 pm, ESPN3 | | at Valparaiso | L 71–89 | 5–6 | Athletics–Recreation Center (2,172); Valparaiso, IN |
| 12/21/2016*; 5:30 pm, ESPN3 | | Eastern Illinois | W 88–85 ^{2OT} | 6–6 | Hulman Center (3,315); Terre Haute, IN |
Missouri Valley Conference regular season
| 12/28/2016; 7:00 pm, FSI/CSNCH | | Wichita State | L 72–80 | 6–7 (0–1) | Hulman Center (4,550); Terre Haute, IN |
| 12/31/2016; 12:00 pm, FSI/CSNCH | | at Missouri State | L 75–81 ^{OT} | 6–8 (0–2) | JQH Arena (4,400); Springfield, MO |
| 01/04/2017; 8:00 pm | | at Southern Illinois | L 74–80 ^{OT} | 6–9 (0–3) | SIU Arena (4,168); Carbondale, IL |
| 01/07/2017; 2:00 pm, FSI/CSNCH | | Illinois State | L 58–77 | 6–10 (0–4) | Hulman Center (3,461); Terre Haute, IN |
| 01/11/2017; 8:00 pm, ESPN3 | | at Drake | L 70–87 | 6–11 (0–5) | Knapp Center (2,958); Des Moines, IA |
| 01/14/2017; 1:00 pm, ESPN3 | | Bradley | W 81–71 | 7–11 (1–5) | Hulman Center (3,969); Terre Haute, IN |
| 01/18/2017; 7:00 pm, ESPN3 | | Missouri State | L 68–73 | 7–12 (1–6) | Hulman Center (3,875); Terre Haute, IN |
| 01/21/2017; 3:00 pm, ESPN3 | | at Wichita State | L 58–84 | 7–13 (1–7) | Charles Koch Arena (10,506); Wichita, KS |
| 01/25/2017; 8:00 pm, ESPN3 | | at Illinois State | L 66–71 | 7–14 (1–8) | Redbird Arena (5,738); Normal, IL |
| 01/28/2017; 2:00 pm, ESPN3 | | Loyola–Chicago | L 66–81 | 7–15 (1–9) | Hulman Center (4,069); Terre Haute, IN |
| 02/01/2017; 7:00 pm, ESPN3 | | Evansville | W 85–84 ^{OT} | 8–15 (2–9) | Hulman Center (3,669); Terre Haute, IN |
| 02/04/2017; 2:00 pm, CBSSN | | at Northern Iowa | L 60–65 | 8–16 (2–10) | McLeod Center (4,982); Cedar Falls, IA |
| 02/08/2017; 9:00 pm, FSI/CSNCH | | at Bradley | W 56–54 | 9–16 (3–10) | Carver Arena (5,004); Peoria, IL |
| 02/11/2017; 2:00 pm | | Drake | W 84–60 | 10–16 (4–10) | Hulman Center (4,280); Terre Haute, IN |
| 02/15/2017; 8:00 pm, ESPN3 | | at Loyola–Chicago | L 46–64 | 10–17 (4–11) | Joseph J. Gentile Arena (1,406); Chicago, IL |
| 02/19/2017; 4:00 pm, ESPN3 | | Southern Illinois | L 68–74 | 10–18 (4–12) | Hulman Center (3,922); Terre Haute, IN |
| 02/22/2017; 7:00 pm, ESPN3 | | Northern Iowa | W 69–59 | 11–18 (5–12) | Hulman Center (3,778); Terre Haute, IN |
| 02/25/2017; 1:00 pm, ESPN3 | | at Evansville | L 63–65 | 11–19 (5–13) | Ford Center (4,913); Evansville, IN |
Missouri Valley tournament
| 03/03/2017; 6:05 pm, ESPN3/FSMW/CSNC | (9) | vs. (8) Evansville; First Round | L 72–83 | 11–20 | Scottrade Center (5,057); St. Louis, MO |
*Non-conference game. ^{#}Rankings from AP Poll. (#) Tournament seedings in parentheses. All times are in Eastern Time.
