= Jeremy Morgan =

American basketball player (born 1995)

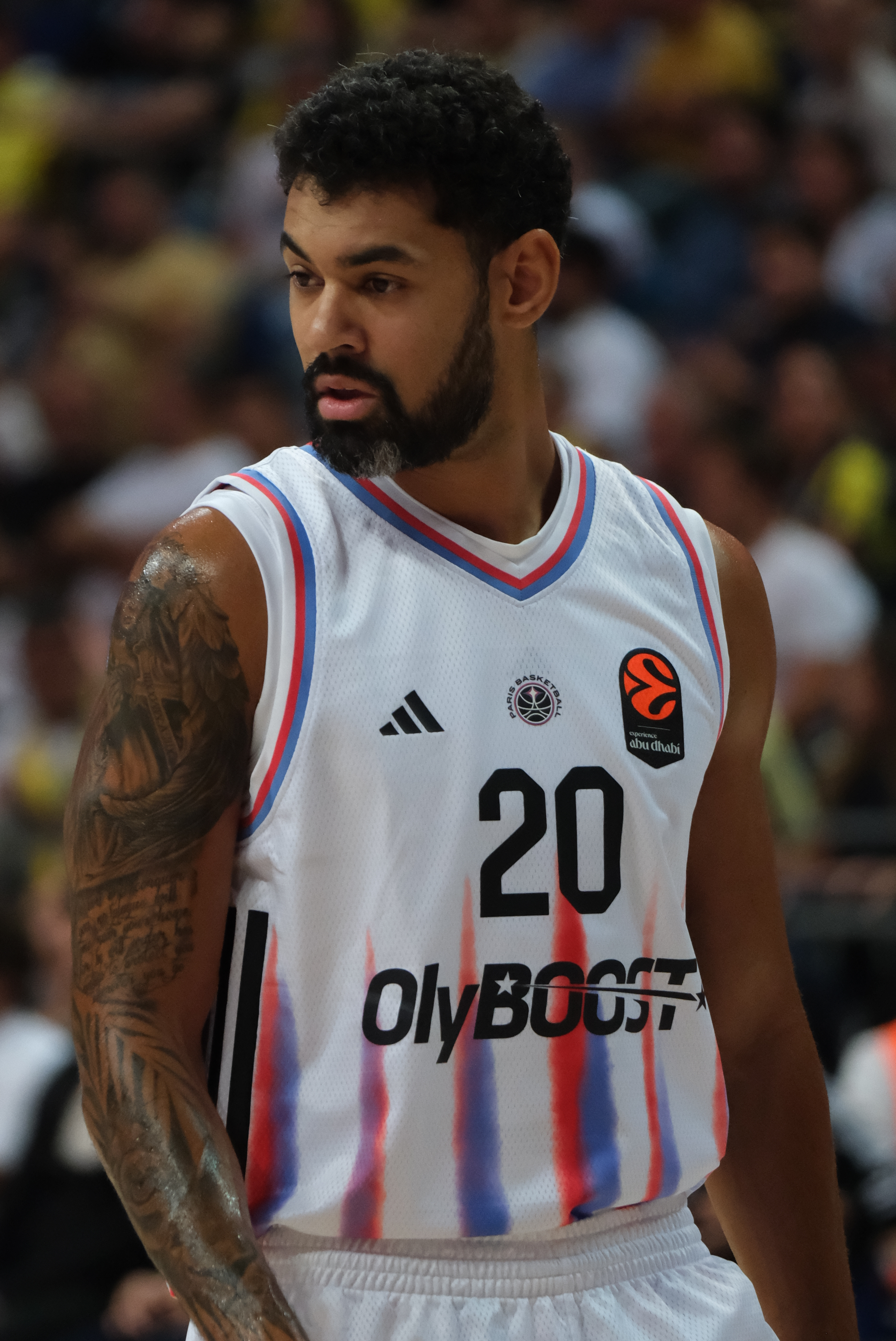
- Morgan with Paris Basketball in 2025

No. 20 – Paris Basketball
- Position: Shooting guard / small forward
- League: LNB Élite; EuroLeague

Personal information
- Born: May 8, 1995 (age 31) Coralville, Iowa, U.S.
- Listed height: 6 ft 6 in (1.98 m)
- Listed weight: 192 lb (87 kg)

Career information
- High school: Iowa City West (Iowa City, Iowa)
- College: Northern Iowa (2013–2017)
- NBA draft: 2017: undrafted
- Playing career: 2017–present

Career history
- 2017–2018: Memphis Hustle
- 2018–2019: Kouvot
- 2019–2020: Crailsheim Merlins
- 2020–2021: Aquila Basket Trento
- 2021–2023: Telekom Baskets Bonn
- 2023–2024: JL Bourg-en-Bresse
- 2024–2025: Hapoel Jerusalem
- 2025–present: Paris Basketball

Career highlights
- Second-team All MVC (2016–17)
- Stats at Basketball Reference

Jeremy Morgan (born May 8, 1995) is an American professional basketball player for Paris Basketball of the LNB Élite and the EuroLeague. He played college basketball for the Northern Iowa Panthers.

== Early years ==
Morgan's hometown is Coralville, Iowa, in the United States. His father, Michael Morgan, played for the University of Iowa in the 1980s; his mother Cris Morgan played for Drake University.

His high school was Iowa City West High School, and he was an All Star for the basketball team. In 2013, he was named Iowa Gatorade Player of the Year. He is 6 ft 5 in (196 cm) tall, and weighs 192 lb (87 kg).

== College ==
Morgan attended college at the University of Northern Iowa, and played basketball for the Northern Iowa Panthers. In 2013–14, playing for coach Ben Jacobson, Morgan averaged 6.0 points per game; he was also named to the 2013–14 Missouri Valley All-Freshman team. In 2014–15, he averaged 5.6 points and 1.1 steals per game.

In 2015–16, Morgan led the MVC with 1.9 steals per game, and averaged 11.3 points, 5.2 rebounds, and 0.9 blocks per game, with a free throw percentage of 80.5%. He was named to the 2015–16 MVC All-Defense team and was an honorable mention for the All-MVC team. He also helped Northern Iowa win the 2016 MVC tournament, being named to the All-Tournament team. In the 2016 NCAA Tournament, he would have 16 points in an upset win over 6-seed Texas, before scoring a career-high 36 points in a double overtime loss to 3-seed Texas A&M.

In 2016–17, Morgan was named the MVC preseason player of the year. He averaged 14.8 points, 5.8 rebounds, 1.8 steals, and 1.1 blocks per game, with a free throw percentage of 78.4%. In a game against North Dakota in December 2016, he scored 38 points in the second half, setting a new career-high for points in a game and outscoring the opposing team by himself in that half. After the season, he was named to the 2016–17 All-MVC 2nd team and 2016–17 MVC All-Defense team.

== Professional career ==
=== Memphis Hustle ===
In July 2017, Morgan signed a contract with the Memphis Grizzlies. Playing 32 games for the Memphis Hustle in the 2017–18 season, he averaged 7.8 points, 3.7 rebounds, and 1.0 steals per game, with an .818 free throw percentage. In October 2017 he was placed on waivers and became a free agent.

=== Kouvot ===
In 2018–19, Morgan played 55 games for Kouvot in the Korisliiga in Finland. He averaged 12.4 points, 4.6 rebounds, and 1.9 steals per game, with a free throw percentage of .829.

=== Crailsheim Merlins ===
In 2019–20, he played for Crailsheim Merlins in the Basketball Bundesliga in Germany, under coach Tuomas Iisalo. Morgan averaged 11.7 points per game.

=== Dolomiti Energia ===
In 2020–21, after signing with the team in July 2020, Morgan played for Aquila Basket Trento in the Lega Basket Serie A in Italy. He averaged 10.4 points and 1.3 steals per game, with a free throw percentage of .836.

=== Telekom Baskets Bonn ===
In 2021–22, after signing with the team in July 2022, he played for Telekom Baskets in Bonn, Germany, in the Basketball Bundesliga, reuniting with his former Merlins coach Tuomas Iisalo. Morgan averaged 13.1 points and 1.3 steals per game, with a free throw percentage of .809. He played for the team again in 2022–23. He averaged 13.4 points and 1.0 steals per game, with a free throw percentage of .844.

=== JL Bourg-en-Bresse ===
In 2023–24, he played for JL Bourg-en-Bresse in the LNB Élite in France. Morgan averaged 9.3 points and 1.7 steals per game.

=== Hapoel Jerusalem ===
In July 2024, Morgan signed to play for Hapoel Jerusalem of the Israeli Basketball Premier League and the EuroCup. Morgan said: "I’m extremely excited to join Hapoel.... I am 100% locked in to help bring Hapoel to the next level. I also remember the unbelievable atmosphere that the red fans brought back in Malaga, and I can't wait to feel that energy once again!! Yalla Hapoel!"

=== Paris Basketball ===
On July 3, 2025, he signed with Paris Basketball of the LNB Pro A.
