= 2016–17 Wichita State Shockers men's basketball team =

American college basketball season

2016–17 Wichita State Shockers men's basketball

MVC regular season co-champions MVC tournament champions

NCAA tournament, Second Round
- Conference: Missouri Valley Conference

Ranking
- Coaches: No. 21
- AP: No. 19
- Record: 31–5 (17–1 MVC)
- Head coach: Gregg Marshall (10th season)
- Assistant coaches: Greg Heiar; Isaac Brown; Kyle Lindsted
- Home arena: Charles Koch Arena

2016–17 Missouri Valley Conference men's basketball standings
	Conf.				Overall
Team	W		L	PCT	W		L	PCT
Illinois State	17	–	1	.944	28	–	7	.800
No. 19 Wichita State†	17	–	1	.944	31	–	5	.861
Northern Iowa	9	–	9	.500	14	–	16	.467
Southern Illinois	9	–	9	.500	17	–	16	.515
Loyola Chicago	8	–	10	.444	18	–	14	.563
Missouri State	7	–	11	.389	17	–	16	.515
Bradley	7	–	11	.389	13	–	20	.394
Evansville	6	–	12	.333	16	–	17	.485
Indiana State	5	–	13	.278	11	–	20	.355
Drake	5	–	13	.278	7	–	24	.226
† 2017 MVC tournament winner Rankings from AP poll

The 2016–17 Wichita State Shockers men's basketball team represented Wichita State University in the 2016–17 NCAA Division I men's basketball season. They played their home games at the Charles Koch Arena in Wichita, Kansas and were led by 10th-year head coach Gregg Marshall. They were members of the Missouri Valley Conference. They finished the season 31–5, 17–1 to finish in a tie for first place in MVC play. In the MVC tournament, they beat Bradley, Missouri State, and Illinois State to win the tournament championship. As a result, they earned the conference's automatic bid to the NCAA tournament. As the No. 10 seed in the South region, they defeated Dayton in the first round before losing to No. 2-seeded Kentucky in the second round.

This was the Shockers' final season as a member of the Missouri Valley Conference, as the school announced on April 7, 2017 that it would be joining the American Athletic Conference effective July 1, 2017.

== Previous season ==
The Shockers finished the 2015–16 season with a record 26–9, 16–2 in Missouri Valley play to win the MVC regular season championship. They lost in the semifinals of the MVC tournament to Northern Iowa. The Shockers received an at-large bid to the NCAA tournament as a No. 11 seed. They defeated Vanderbilt in the First Four and Arizona in the first round before losing to Miami (FL) in the second round.

== Offseason ==
=== Departures ===
Name	Number	Pos.	Height	Weight	Year	Hometown	Reason left
Evan Wessel	3	G	6'3"	218	Senior	Wichita, KS	Graduated
Anton Grady	15	F	6'8"	230	Graduate	Cleveland, OH	Completed athletic eligibility; graduated from Cleveland State in 2015
Tom Wamukota	21	C	6'11"	224	Senior	Bungoma, Kenya	Graduated
Fred VanVleet	23	G	6'0"	195	Senior	Rockford, IL	Graduated
Ron Baker	31	G	6'4"	220	RS Senior	Scott City, KS	Graduated

=== Class of 2016 recruits ===
College recruiting information
Name	Hometown	School	Height	Weight	Commit date
Darrlyn Willis; PF	Poplarville, MS	Pearl River C.C.	6 ft 8 in (2.03 m)	225 lb (102 kg)	Nov 13, 2015
Darrlyn Willis; PF	Recruit ratings: Scout: Rivals: 247Sports: (NR)				
C. J. Keyser; G	Wolfeboro, NH	Brewster Academy	6 ft 3 in (1.91 m)	185 lb (84 kg)	Nov 23, 2015
C. J. Keyser; G	Recruit ratings: Scout: Rivals: 247Sports: ESPN:				
Daishon Smith; G	Tallahassee, FL	Tallahassee C.C.	6 ft 1 in (1.85 m)	165 lb (75 kg)	Nov 23, 2015
Daishon Smith; G	Recruit ratings: Scout: Rivals: 247Sports: (NR)				
Austin Reaves; PG	Newark, AR	Cedar Ridge High School	6 ft 5 in (1.96 m)	170 lb (77 kg)	Jan 20, 2016
Austin Reaves; PG	Recruit ratings: Scout: Rivals: 247Sports: (NR)				
Overall recruit ranking:
Note: In many cases, Scout, Rivals, 247Sports, On3, and ESPN may conflict in their listings of height and weight.; In these cases, the average was taken. ESPN grades are on a 100-point scale.; Sources: "2016 Wichita State Basketball Commits". Rivals.; "2016 Wichita State Basketball Commits". Scout.; "2016 Wichita State Basketball Commits". ESPN.; "Scout.com Team Recruiting Rankings". Scout.; "2016 Team Ranking". Rivals.

== Preseason ==
The Shockers were picked, for the fourth consecutive year, to win the Missouri Valley Conference by an MVC preseason poll. Markis McDuffie, the 2016 MVC Freshman of the Year, was selected to the conference's preseason All-MVC team.

== Roster ==
2016–17 Wichita State Shockers men's basketball team
Players
Coaches

Pos.	#	Name	Height	Weight	Year	Previous school	Hometown
F	0	Rashard Kelly	6 ft 7 in (2.01 m)	225 lb (102 kg)	Jr	Hargrave Military Academy	Fredericksburg, Virginia
F	1	Zach Brown	6 ft 6 in (1.98 m)	215 lb (98 kg)	Jr	Sunrise Christian Academy	Houston, Texas
G	2	Daishon Smith	6 ft 1 in (1.85 m)	175 lb (79 kg)	Jr	Tallahassee Community College	Jacksonville, Florida
G	3	C. J. Keyser	6 ft 3 in (1.91 m)	194 lb (88 kg)	Fr	Brewster Academy	Baltimore, Maryland
F	4	Brett Barney (W)	6 ft 9 in (2.06 m)	227 lb (103 kg)	RS Fr	Sunrise Christian Academy	Wichita, Kansas
G	5	Zach Bush (W)	6 ft 6 in (1.98 m)	200 lb (91 kg)	RS Sr	Eisenhower High School	Wichita, Kansas
G	10	Kaelen Malone	6 ft 0 in (1.83 m)	176 lb (80 kg)	So	McLennan Community College	McKinney, Texas
G	11	Landry Shamet	6 ft 4 in (1.93 m)	188 lb (85 kg)	RS Fr	Park Hill High School	Kansas City, Missouri
G	12	Austin Reaves	6 ft 5 in (1.96 m)	179 lb (81 kg)	Fr	Cedar Ridge High School	Newark, Arkansas
G	14	John Robert Simon (W)	5 ft 10 in (1.78 m)	175 lb (79 kg)	Sr	Putnam City North High School	Oklahoma City, Oklahoma
C	20	Rauno Nurger	6 ft 10 in (2.08 m)	238 lb (108 kg)	Jr	Sunrise Christian Academy	Keila, Estonia
F	21	Darral Willis Jr.	6 ft 9 in (2.06 m)	221 lb (100 kg)	Jr	Pearl River Community College	Madison, Wisconsin
C	24	Shaquille Morris	6 ft 8 in (2.03 m)	265 lb (120 kg)	RS Jr	Edmond Memorial High School	Edmond, Oklahoma
F	25	Eric Hamilton	6 ft 8 in (2.03 m)	230 lb (104 kg)	So	Sunrise Christian Academy	Atlanta, Georgia
F	32	Markis McDuffie	6 ft 8 in (2.03 m)	212 lb (96 kg)	So	St. Anthony High School	Paterson, New Jersey
G	33	Conner Frankamp	6 ft 1 in (1.85 m)	172 lb (78 kg)	RS Jr	Kansas	Wichita, Kansas

Head coach

- Gregg Marshall (Randolph–Macon)

Assistant coach(es)

- Greg Heiar (Franciscan)
- Isaac Brown (Louisiana–Monroe)
- Kyle Lindsted (Central Christian (KS))

Legend

- (C) Team captain
- (S) Suspended
- (I) Ineligible
- (W) Walk-on
- Injured
- Current redshirt

Roster

== Schedule and results ==
Date time, TV	Rank^{#}	Opponent^{#}	Result	Record	High points	High rebounds	High assists	Site (attendance) city, state
Exhibition
Nov 5, 2016*; 2:00 pm, Cox Kansas		Augusta	W 73–67		24 – Morris	7 – Tied	7 – Shamet	Charles Koch Arena (10,105); Wichita, KS
Non-conference regular season
Nov 11, 2016*; 8:30 pm, Cox Kansas		South Carolina State	W 85–39	1–0	14 – Nurger	9 – Kelly	4 – Tied	Charles Koch Arena (10,506); Wichita, KS
Nov 13, 2016*; 7:00 pm, Cox Kansas		Long Beach State; Battle 4 Atlantis opening round	W 92–55	2–0	15 – Frankamp	6 – Smith	6 – Smith	Charles Koch Arena (10,506); Wichita, KS
Nov 16, 2016*; 7:00 pm, ESPN3		Tulsa	W 80–53	3–0	18 – McDuffie	7 – McDuffie	4 – McDuffie	Charles Koch Arena (10,506); Wichita, KS
Nov 20, 2016*; 2:00 pm, Cox Kansas		Maryland Eastern Shore	W 116–79	4–0	16 – Tied	4 – Tied	5 – Frankamp	Charles Koch Arena (10,506); Wichita, KS
Nov 23, 2016*; 11:00 am, ESPN2		vs. LSU; Battle 4 Atlantis quarterfinals	W 82–47	5–0	16 – Shamet	6 – Kelly	7 – Frankamp	Imperial Arena (1,604); Nassau, Bahamas
Nov 24, 2016*; 1:30 pm, ESPN		vs. No. 10 Louisville; Battle 4 Atlantis semifinals	L 52–62	5–1	10 – Tied	5 – Nurger	3 – Shamet	Imperial Arena (1,604); Nassau, Bahamas
Nov 25, 2016*; 12:00 pm, ESPN2		vs. No. 24 Michigan State; Battle 4 Atlantis 3rd place game	L 72–77	5–2	16 – Willis Jr.	6 – Willis Jr.	3 – Shamet	Imperial Arena (1,569); Nassau, Bahamas
Nov 29, 2016*; 7:00 pm, Cox Kansas		Southern Nazarene	W 87–57	6–2	15 – Morris	9 – Willis Jr.	5 – Smith	Charles Koch Arena (10,436); Wichita, KS
Dec 3, 2016*; 4:00 pm, CBSSN		at Colorado State; MW–MVC Challenge	W 82–67	7–2	16 – Brown	6 – Morris	4 – Smith	Moby Arena; Fort Collins, CO
Dec 6, 2016; 7:00 pm, Cox Kansas		Saint Louis	W 75–45	8–2	15 – Kelly	8 – Kelly	5 – Shamet	Charles Koch Arena (10,157); Wichita, KS
Dec 10, 2016*; 3:00 pm, ESPN2		vs. Oklahoma; All-College Classic	W 76–73	9–2	17 – Brown	8 – McDuffie	6 – Smith	Chesapeake Energy Arena (11,157); Oklahoma City, OK
Dec 17, 2016*; 6:00 pm, ESPN3		Oklahoma State	L 76–93	9–3	24 – Willis Jr.	13 – Willis	3 – Tied	Intrust Bank Arena (15,004); Wichita, KS
Dec 22, 2016*; 7:00 pm, Cox Kansas		South Dakota State	W 89–67	10–3	21 – Shamet	9 – Willis Jr.	6 – Brown	Charles Koch Arena (10,506); Wichita, KS
Missouri Valley regular season
Dec 28, 2016; 6:00 pm, Cox Kansas		at Indiana State	W 80–72	11–3 (1–0)	25 – Willis Jr.	10 – Willis Jr.	4 – Shamet	Hulman Center (4,550); Terre Haute, IN
Jan 1, 2017; 1:00 pm, Cox Kansas		Bradley	W 100–66	12–3 (2–0)	15 – Tied	6 – Kelly	6 – Shamet	Charles Koch Arena (10,506); Wichita, KS
Jan 4, 2017; 7:00 pm, Cox Kansas		Drake	W 90–65	13–3 (3–0)	13 – Tied	11 – McDuffie	5 – Shamet	Charles Koch Arena (10,383); Wichita, KS
Jan 8, 2017; 3:30 pm, ESPNU		at Northern Iowa	W 80–66	14–3 (4–0)	17 – Shamet	5 – McDuffie	3 – Tied	McLeod Center (5,547); Cedar Falls, IA
Jan 11, 2017; 6:00 pm, Cox Kansas		Loyola–Chicago	W 87–75	15–3 (5–0)	26 – McDuffie	6 – Nurger	3 – Tied	Charles Koch Arena (10,506); Wichita, KS
Jan 14, 2017; 7:00 pm, ESPN2		at Illinois State	L 62–76	15–4 (5–1)	14 – Tied	9 – Willis Jr	6 – Shamet	Redbird Arena (9,078); Bloomington, IL
Jan 17, 2017; 8:00 pm, CBSSN		at Evansville	W 82–65	16–4 (6–1)	17 – Morris	10 – Morris	5 – Shamet	Ford Center (4,019); Evansville, IN
Jan 21, 2017; 2:00 pm, ESPN3		Indiana State	W 84–58	17–4 (7–1)	24 – Morris	8 – Morris	4 – Morris	Charles Koch Arena (10,506); Wichita, KS
Jan 24, 2017; 6:00 pm, CBSSN		Southern Illinois	W 87–45	18–4 (8–1)	20 – McDuffie	9 – McDuffie	4 – Tied	Charles Koch Arena (10,506); Wichita, KS
Jan 29, 2017; 3:00 pm, ESPNU		at Bradley	W 64–49	19–4 (9–1)	19 – Shamet	14 – McDuffie	6 – Shamet	Carver Arena (6,001); Peoria, IL
Feb 1, 2017; 6:00 pm, Cox Kansas		at Drake	W 77–69	20–4 (10–1)	17 – Shamet	14 – McDuffie	8 – McDuffie	Knapp Center (3,024); Des Moines, IA
Feb 4, 2017; 7:00 pm, ESPN2		Illinois State	W 86–45	21–4 (11–1)	18 – Frankamp	11 – Morris	5 – Brown	Charles Koch Arena (10,506); Wichita, KS
Feb 9, 2017; 8:00 pm, CBSSN		Missouri State	W 80–62	22–4 (12–1)	13 – Morris	4 – 3 tied	5 – McDuffie	Charles Koch Arena (10,506); Wichita, KS
Feb 12, 2017; 3:00 pm, ESPNU		at Loyola–Chicago	W 81–64	23–4 (13–1)	16 – Frankamp, Shamet	9 – Morris	7 – Shamet	Joseph J. Gentile Arena (4,156); Chicago, IL
Feb 15, 2017; 6:00 PM, Cox Kansas		at Southern Illinois	W 87–68	24–4 (14–1)	14 – Frankamp	9 – McDuffie	6 – Shamet	SIU Arena (4,447); Carbondale, IL
Feb 18, 2017; 11:00 am, ESPN2		Northern Iowa	W 73–44	25–4 (15–1)	14 – Shamet, Willis	11 – Willis	5 – Frankamp	Charles Koch Arena (10,506); Wichita, KS
Feb 21, 2017; 7:00 pm, Cox Kansas	No. 25	Evansville	W 109–83	26–4 (16–1)	18 – Morris	6 – Kelly	6 – Kelly	Charles Koch Arena (10,506); Wichita, KS
Feb 25, 2017; 11:00 am, ESPN2	No. 25	at Missouri State	W 86–67	27–4 (17–1)	23 – Shamet	8 – Shamet	5 – Tied	JQH Arena (6,823); Springfield, MO
Missouri Valley tournament
Mar 3, 2017; 6:05 pm, ESPN3/FSMW/CSNC	(2) No. 21	vs. (7) Bradley; Quarterfinals	W 82–56	28–4	14 – Kelly	10 – McDuffie	3 – Tied	Scottrade Center (9,124); St. Louis, MO
Mar 4, 2017; 5:00 pm, CBSSN	(2) No. 21	vs. (6) Missouri State; Semifinals	W 78–63	29–4	21 – Morris	7 – Tied	4 – Shamet	Scottrade Center (12,124); St. Louis, MO
Mar 5, 2017; 1:00 pm, CBS	(2) No. 21	vs. (1) Illinois State; Championship	W 71–51	30–4	19 – Frankamp	10 – Morris	2 – Kelly	Scottrade Center (11,744); St. Louis, MO
NCAA tournament
Mar 17, 2017*; 6:10 pm, CBS	(10 S) No. 19	vs. (7 S) Dayton; First Round	W 64–58	31–4	13 – Shamet	11 – Kelly	3 – Tied	Bankers Life Fieldhouse (18,269); Indianapolis, IN
Mar 19, 2017*; 1:40 pm, CBS	(10 S) No. 19	vs. (2 S) No. 5 Kentucky; Second Round	L 62–65	31–5	20 – Shamet	8 – Tied	3 – McDuffie	Bankers Life Fieldhouse (18,293); Indianapolis, IN
*Non-conference game. ^{#}Rankings from AP Poll. (#) Tournament seedings in parentheses. S=South Region. All times are in Central Time.

== Rankings ==
Ranking movements Legend: ██ Increase in ranking ██ Decrease in ranking — = Not ranked RV = Received votes
	Week																			
Poll	Pre	1	2	3	4	5	6	7	8	9	10	11	12	13	14	15	16	17	18	Final
AP	RV	RV	RV	—	RV	RV	—	—	—	RV	—	—	RV	RV	RV	25	21	20	19	Not released
Coaches	RV	RV	RV	RV	RV	RV	RV	—	—	RV	—	—	RV	RV	RV	25	22	22	19	

*AP does not release post-NCAA tournament rankings
