= 2016–17 Southern Illinois Salukis men's basketball team =

American college basketball season

2016–17 Southern Illinois Salukis men's basketball
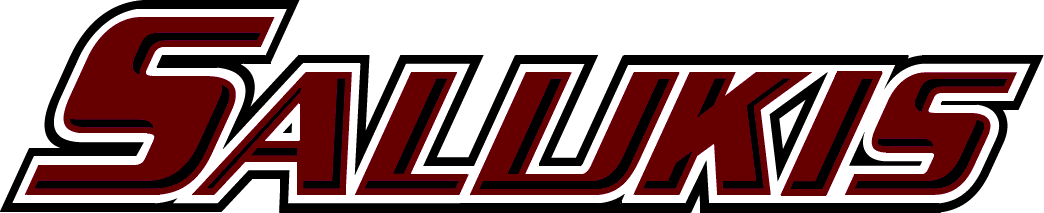
- Conference: Missouri Valley Conference
- Record: 17–16 (9–9 MVC)
- Head coach: Barry Hinson (5th season)
- Assistant coaches: Brad Autry; Anthony Beane, Sr.; Terrance McGee
- Home arena: SIU Arena

2016–17 Missouri Valley Conference men's basketball standings
	Conf.				Overall
Team	W		L	PCT	W		L	PCT
Illinois State	17	–	1	.944	28	–	7	.800
No. 19 Wichita State†	17	–	1	.944	31	–	5	.861
Northern Iowa	9	–	9	.500	14	–	16	.467
Southern Illinois	9	–	9	.500	17	–	16	.515
Loyola Chicago	8	–	10	.444	18	–	14	.563
Missouri State	7	–	11	.389	17	–	16	.515
Bradley	7	–	11	.389	13	–	20	.394
Evansville	6	–	12	.333	16	–	17	.485
Indiana State	5	–	13	.278	11	–	20	.355
Drake	5	–	13	.278	7	–	24	.226
† 2017 MVC tournament winner Rankings from AP poll

The 2016–17 Southern Illinois Salukis men's basketball team represented Southern Illinois University Carbondale during the 2016–17 NCAA Division I men's basketball season. The Salukis, led by fifth-year head coach Barry Hinson, played their home games at the SIU Arena in Carbondale, Illinois as members of the Missouri Valley Conference. They finished the season 17–16, 9–9 in MVC play to finish in a tie for third place. In the MVC tournament, they defeated Loyola–Chicago in the quarterfinals before losing to Illinois State in the semifinals.

== Previous season ==
The Salukis finished the 2015–16 season with a record of 22–10, 11–7 in Missouri Valley play to finish in a tie for fourth place. They lost in the quarterfinals of the MVC tournament to Northern Iowa. Despite having 22 wins, they chose not to participate in a postseason tournament.

== Offseason ==
=== Departures ===
Name	Number	Pos.	Height	Weight	Year	Hometown	Notes
Jeremy Postell	2	F	6'6"	205	Junior	Atlanta, GA	Graduate transferred to William Penn
Ibby Djimde	10	C	6'8"	255	RS Senior	Bamako, Mali	Graduated
Bola Olaniyah	23	F	6'7"	225	Junior	Lagos, Nigeria	Graduate transferred to Alabama
Anthony Beane, Jr.	25	G	6'2"	190	Senior	Normal, IL	Graduated
Deng Leek	32	C	7'0"	230	Senior	Sudan	Graduated

=== Incoming transfers ===
Name	Number	Pos.	Height	Weight	Year	Hometown	Previous School
Jonathan Wiley	0	G	6'5"	190	Junior	Houston, TX	Junior college transferred from Panola College
Marcus Bartley	3	G	6'4"	180	Junior	Decatur, IL	Transferred from Saint Louis. Under NCAA transfer rules, Bartley will have to sit out for the 2016–17 season. Will have two years of remaining eligibility.
Thik Bol	40	F	6'8"	205	Junior	Omaha, NE	Junior college transferred from Iowa Western CC

=== 2016 recruiting class ===
College recruiting information
Name	Hometown	School	Height	Weight	Commit date
Jeremy Roscoe; SG	Chicago, IL	Victory Rock Preparatory School	6 ft 2 in (1.88 m)	N/A	Jan 24, 2016
Jeremy Roscoe; SG	Recruit ratings: Scout: Rivals: (N/A)				
Brendon Gooch; SF	Belleville, IL	Althoff Catholic High School	6 ft 5 in (1.96 m)	180 lb (82 kg)	Jul 20, 2013
Brendon Gooch; SF	Recruit ratings: Scout: Rivals: (N/A)				
Aaron Cook; PG	Saint Louis, MO	Westminster Christian Academy	6 ft 1 in (1.85 m)	170 lb (77 kg)	Jul 20, 2015
Aaron Cook; PG	Recruit ratings: Scout: Rivals: (N/A)				
Overall recruit ranking:
Note: In many cases, Scout, Rivals, 247Sports, On3, and ESPN may conflict in their listings of height and weight.; In these cases, the average was taken. ESPN grades are on a 100-point scale.; Sources: "2016 Team Ranking". Rivals.

== Roster ==
2016–17 Southern Illinois Salukis men's basketball team
Players
Coaches

Pos.	#	Name	Height	Weight	Year	Previous school	Hometown
G	0	Jonathan Wiley	6 ft 6 in (1.98 m)	200 lb (91 kg)	Jr	Panola College; St. Pius	Houston, TX
G	1	Mike Rodriguez	5 ft 10 in (1.78 m)	165 lb (75 kg)	Sr	Marshalltown CC; Redemption Christian Academy	Boston, MA
G	3	Marcus Bartley (I) (redshirt)	6 ft 4 in (1.93 m)	176 lb (80 kg)	Jr	Saint Louis; Douglas MacArthur	Decatur, IL
G	5	Leo Vincent	6 ft 1 in (1.85 m)	185 lb (84 kg)	Sr	Harcum College; Bensalem	Bensalem, PA
G	10	Aaron Cook Jr.	6 ft 1 in (1.85 m)	175 lb (79 kg)	Fr	Westminster Christian	St. Louis, MO
G	11	Tyler Smithpeters	6 ft 4 in (1.93 m)	198 lb (90 kg)	Sr	Harrisburg	Harrisburg, IL
G	13	Sean Lloyd	6 ft 5 in (1.96 m)	215 lb (98 kg)	So	Mt. Zion Prep	Philadelphia, PA
F	15	Austin Weiher	6 ft 8 in (2.03 m)	210 lb (95 kg)	RS So	Creating Young Minds Academy	Kent, WA
G	22	Armon Fletcher	6 ft 4 in (1.93 m)	190 lb (86 kg)	RS So	Edwardsville	Edwardsville, IL
F	24	Rudy Stradnieks	6 ft 9 in (2.06 m)	240 lb (109 kg)	So	Lee Academy	Riga, Latvia
G	25	Brendon Gooch	6 ft 5 in (1.96 m)	201 lb (91 kg)	Fr	Althoff	Belleville, IL
F	33	Sean O'Brien	6 ft 7 in (2.01 m)	215 lb (98 kg)	Sr	Mundelein	Mundelein, IL
F	40	Thik Bol	6 ft 8 in (2.03 m)	200 lb (91 kg)	Jr	Benson; Iowa Western CC	Omaha, NE

Head coach

- Barry Hinson (Oklahoma State)

Assistant coach(es)

- Jerome Beane, Sr. (Kansas State)
- Brad Autry (Northwestern Oklahoma State)
- Terrance McGee (Missouri State)

Legend

- (C) Team captain
- (S) Suspended
- (I) Ineligible
- (W) Walk-on
- Injured
- Current redshirt

Roster

== Schedule and results ==
Date time, TV	Rank^{#}	Opponent^{#}	Result	Record	High points	High rebounds	High assists	Site (attendance) city, state
Exhibition
11/03/2016*; 7:00 pm, ESPN3		Missouri–St. Louis	W 72–67		13 – Lloyd	8 – Fletcher	3 – Smithpeters	SIU Arena; Carbondale, IL
Non-conference regular season
11/11/2016*; 7:00 pm, ESPN3		Wright State	L 81–85	0–1	29 – Rodriguez	6 – Tied	6 – Rodriguez	SIU Arena (4,427); Carbondale, IL
11/14/2016*; 7:00 pm		at Arkansas	L 65–90	0–2	13 – Fletcher	12 – Bol	4 – Rodriguez	Bud Walton Arena (13,308); Fayetteville, AR
11/16/2016; 7:00 pm, ESPN3		Missouri Southern State	W 85–64	1–2	19 – O'Brien	17 – Bol	4 – Rodriguez	SIU Arena (4,042); Carbondale, IL
11/18/2016; 7:00 pm		at SIU Edwardsville	W 101–83	2–2	22 – O'Brien	9 – O'Brien	9 – O'Brien	Vadalabene Center (3,017); Edwardsville, IL
11/21/2016; 7:00 pm, ESPN3		Mount St. Mary's	W 73–63	3–2	19 – Fletcher	18 – O'Brien	9 – O'Brien	SIU Arena (3,971); Carbondale, IL
11/25/2016; 7:00 pm		at Minnesota	L 45–57	3–3	15 – Bol	7 – Bol	9 – Rodriguez	Williams Arena (9,603); Minneapolis, MN
11/29/2016; 7:00 pm, ESPN3		Murray State	W 89–85 ^{OT}	4–3	21 – Rodriguez	9 – O'Brien	5 – Rodriguez	SIU Arena (4,334); Carbondale, IL
12/03/2016; 4:00 pm, ESPN3		Texas Southern	W 74–70	5–3	18 – Fletcher	7 – Bol	10 – Rodriguez	SIU Arena (4,472); Carbondale, IL
12/07/2016; 6:00 pm, ACCN Extra		at No. 11 Louisville	L 51–74	5–4	15 – Tied	11 – O'Brien	4 – Rodriguez	KFC Yum! Center (18,894); Louisville, KY
12/10/2016; 1:00 pm, ESPN3		Sam Houston State	L 73–79	5–5	14 – Fletcher	9 – Fletcher	3 – Rodriguez	SIU Arena (4,278); Carbondale, IL
12/14/2016; 7:00 pm, ESPN3		Saint Louis	W 70–55	6–5	21 – Fletcher	13 – O'Brien	3 – Tied	SIU Arena (4,459); Carbondale, IL
12/19/2016; 9:00 pm		at UNLV	L 61–68	6–6	15 – Tied	9 – Bol	5 – Tied	Thomas & Mack Center (11,758); Las Vegas, NV
12/22/2016; 7:00 pm, ESPN3		UT Martin	W 78–70	7–6	22 – Fletcher	7 – Bol	5 – Rodriguez	SIU Arena (4,280); Carbondale, IL
Missouri Valley regular season
12/29/2016; 7:00 pm, ESPN3		at Bradley	L 51–60	7–7 (0–1)	10 – Tied	12 – Bol	2 – Tied	Carver Arena (5,989); Peoria, IL
01/01/2017; 4:00 pm, ESPN3		Drake	W 83–69	8–7 (1–1)	16 – O'Brien	13 – O'Brien	5 – O'Brien	SIU Arena (4,143); Carbondale, IL
01/04/2017; 7:00 pm, ESPN3		Indiana State	W 80–74 ^{OT}	9–7 (2–1)	28 – O'Brien	14 – O'Brien	3 – Rodriguez	SIU Arena (4,168); Carbondale, IL
01/07/2017; 3:00 pm, CBSSN		at Missouri State	W 75–67	10–7 (3–1)	22 – Rodriguez	9 – Bol	3 – Rodriguez	JQH Arena (5,892); Springfield, MO
01/11/2017; 7:00 pm, ESPN3		Illinois State	L 53–60	10–8 (3–2)	15 – O'Brien	7 – Tied	5 – Rodriguez	SIU Arena (4,556); Carbondale, IL
01/14/2017; 1:00 pm, FSMW/CSNCH		at Evansville	W 73–61	11–8 (4–2)	20 – Rodriguez	8 – Fletcher	4 – Rodriguez	Fortd Center (4,803); Evansville, IN
01/18/2017; 7:00 pm, ESPN3		at Drake	L 84–88 ^{OT}	11–9 (4–3)	24 – Rodriguez	8 – Bol	7 – Rodriguez	Knapp Center (2,508); Des Moines, IA
01/21/2017; 7:00 pm, ESPN3		Northern Iowa	L 57–58	11–10 (4–4)	16 – Fletcher	8 – O'Brien	3 – Rodriguez	SIU Arena (5,015); Carbondale, IL
01/24/2017; 6:00 pm, CBSSN		at Wichita State	L 45–87	11–11 (4–5)	12 – O'Brien	5 – 3 tied	2 – Rodriguez	Charles Koch Arena (10,506); Wichita, KS
01/28/2017; 7:00 pm, FSMW/CSNCH		Missouri State	W 85–84 ^{OT}	12–11 (5–5)	24 – O'Brien	11 – Fletcher	6 – Tied	SIU Arena (4,518); Carbondale, IL
02/01/2017; 7:00 pm, ESPN3		Bradley	W 85–65	13–11 (6–5)	15 – Rodriquez	8 – O'Brien	6 – Rodriquez	SIU Arena (4,689); Carbondale, IL
02/04/2017; 1:00 pm, FSMW/CSNCH		at Loyola–Chicago	W 67–61	14–11 (7–5)	19 – O'Brien	10 – O'Brien	4 – O'Brien	Joseph J. Gentile Arena (2,315); Chicago, IL
02/08/2017; 7:00 pm, ESPN3		at Northern Iowa	L 41–49	14–12 (7–6)	9 – Vincent	12 – O'Brien	4 – O'Brien	McLeod Center (3,921); Cedar Falls, IA
02/11/2017; 3:00 pm, FSMW/CSNCH		Evansville	L 70–75	14–13 (7–7)	21 – Vincent	13 – O'Brien	3 – Cook	SIU Arena (5,490); Carbondale, IL
02/15/2017; 6:00 pm, FSMW/CSNCH		Wichita State	L 68–87	14–14 (7–8)	14 – O'Brien	8 – O'Brien	2 – Tied	SIU Arena (4,447); Carbondale, IL
02/19/2017; 3:00 pm, ESPN3		at Indiana State	W 74–68	15–14 (8–8)	19 – Bol	11 – Bol	6 – O'Brien	Hulman Center (3,922); Terre Haure, IN
02/22/2017; 7:00 pm, FSMW/CSNCH		at Illinois State	L 46–50	15–15 (8–9)	12 – Bol	8 – Fletcher	4 – O'Brien	Redbird Arena (6,545); Normal, IL
02/25/2017; 1:00 pm, ESPN3		Loyola–Chicago	W 72–70	16–15 (9–9)	17 – O'Brien	13 – O'Brien	5 – O'Brien	SIU Arena (10,014); Carbondale, IL
Missouri Valley tournament
03/03/2017; 2:35 pm, ESPN3/FSMW/CSNC	(4)	vs. (5) Loyola–Chicago; Quarterfinals	W 72–70	17–15	16 – Rodriguez	9 – O'Brien	4 – O'Brien	Scottrade Center (8,648); St. Louis, MO
03/04/2017; 2:30 pm, CBSSN	(4)	vs. (1) Illinois State; Semifinals	L 50–63	17–16	12 – Lloyd	8 – O'Brien	5 – Rodriguez	Scottrade Center (12,124); St. Louis, MO
*Non-conference game. ^{#}Rankings from AP Poll. (#) Tournament seedings in parentheses. All times are in Central Time.
