= 2017 Missouri Valley Conference men's basketball tournament =

- Classification: Division I
- Season: 2016–17
- Teams: 10
- Site: Scottrade Center; St. Louis, Missouri
- Champions: Wichita State (4th title)
- Winning coach: Gregg Marshall (2nd title)
- MVP: Conner Frankamp (Wichita State)
- Television: ESPN3, CBSSN, CBS

2016–17 Missouri Valley Conference men's basketball standings
	Conf.				Overall
Team	W		L	PCT	W		L	PCT
Illinois State	17	–	1	.944	28	–	7	.800
No. 19 Wichita State†	17	–	1	.944	31	–	5	.861
Northern Iowa	9	–	9	.500	14	–	16	.467
Southern Illinois	9	–	9	.500	17	–	16	.515
Loyola Chicago	8	–	10	.444	18	–	14	.563
Missouri State	7	–	11	.389	17	–	16	.515
Bradley	7	–	11	.389	13	–	20	.394
Evansville	6	–	12	.333	16	–	17	.485
Indiana State	5	–	13	.278	11	–	20	.355
Drake	5	–	13	.278	7	–	24	.226
† 2017 MVC tournament winner Rankings from AP poll

The 2017 Missouri Valley Conference men's basketball tournament, popularly referred to as "Arch Madness", was the postseason men's basketball tournament that completed the 2016–17 season in the Missouri Valley Conference. The tournament was held at the Scottrade Center, now known as Enterprise Center, in St. Louis, Missouri from March 2–5, 2017. Wichita State defeated Illinois State in the championship game and earned the conference's automatic bid to the NCAA tournament.

This was the last MVC tournament for Wichita State, as it would leave its conference home of nearly 70 years to join the American Athletic Conference in July 2017.

== Seeds ==
Teams were seeded by conference record, with ties broken by record between the tied teams followed by overall adjusted RPI, if necessary. The top six seeds received first-round byes.

Seed	School	Conference	Tiebreaker 1	Tiebreaker 2
1	Illinois State	17–1	1–1 vs. Wichita State	RPI: 34
2	Wichita State	17–1	1–1 vs. Illinois State	RPI: 40
3	Northern Iowa	9–9	2–0 vs Southern Illinois	
4	Southern Illinois	9–9	0–2 vs Northern Iowa	
5	Loyola–Chicago	8–10		
6	Missouri State	7–11	1–1 vs. Bradley	RPI: 216
7	Bradley	7–11	1–1 vs. Missouri State	RPI: 220
8	Evansville	6–12		
9	Indiana State	5–13	1–1 vs. Drake	RPI: 222
10	Drake	5–13	1–1 vs. Indiana State	RPI: 305

== Schedule ==
Game	Time*	Matchup	Score	Television
Opening round – Thursday, March 2
1	6:05 pm	No. 8 Evansville vs. No. 9 Indiana State	83–72	ESPN3/FSMW/CSNC
2	8:35 pm	No. 7 Bradley vs. No. 10 Drake	67–58	ESPN3/FSMW/CSNC
Quarterfinals – Friday, March 3
3	12:05 pm	No. 1 Illinois State vs. No. 8 Evansville	80–69	ESPN3/FSMW/CSNC
4	2:35 pm	No. 4 Southern Illinois vs. No. 5 Loyola–Chicago	55-50	ESPN3/FSMW/CSNC
5	6:05 pm	No. 2 Wichita State vs. No. 7 Bradley	82–56	ESPN3/FSMW/CSNC
6	8:35 pm	No. 3 Northern Iowa vs. No. 6 Missouri State	64–70	ESPN3/FSMW/CSNC
Semifinals – Saturday, March 4
7	2:35 pm	No. 1 Illinois State vs. No. 4 Southern Illinois	63–50	CBSSN
8	5:05 pm	No. 2 Wichita State vs. No. 6 Missouri State	78–63	CBSSN
Final – Sunday, March 5
9	1:05 pm	No. 1 Illinois State vs. No. 2 Wichita State	51–71	CBS
*Game times in CT. Rankings denote tournament seeding.

== Tournament bracket ==
Opening round Thursday, March 2 MVC TV
8	Evansville	83
9	Indiana State	72
7	Bradley	67
10	Drake	58

Quarterfinals; Friday, March 3 MVC TV
1	Illinois State	80
8	Evansville	69
4	Southern Illinois	55
5	Loyola-Chicago	50
2	#21 Wichita State	82
7	Bradley	56
3	Northern Iowa	64
6	Missouri State	70

Semifinals; Saturday, March 4 CBSSN
1	Illinois State	63
4	Southern Illinois	50
2	#21 Wichita State	78
6	Missouri State	63

Final; Sunday, March 5 CBS
1	Illinois State	51
2	#21 Wichita State	71
