= 2016–17 Evansville Purple Aces men's basketball team =

American college basketball season

2016–17 Evansville Purple Aces men's basketball
- Conference: Missouri Valley Conference
- Record: 16–17 (6–12 MVC)
- Head coach: Marty Simmons (10th season)
- Assistant coaches: Doug Novsek; Lennox Forrester; Geoff Alexander
- Home arena: Ford Center

2016–17 Missouri Valley Conference men's basketball standings
	Conf.				Overall
Team	W		L	PCT	W		L	PCT
Illinois State	17	–	1	.944	28	–	7	.800
No. 19 Wichita State†	17	–	1	.944	31	–	5	.861
Northern Iowa	9	–	9	.500	14	–	16	.467
Southern Illinois	9	–	9	.500	17	–	16	.515
Loyola Chicago	8	–	10	.444	18	–	14	.563
Missouri State	7	–	11	.389	17	–	16	.515
Bradley	7	–	11	.389	13	–	20	.394
Evansville	6	–	12	.333	16	–	17	.485
Indiana State	5	–	13	.278	11	–	20	.355
Drake	5	–	13	.278	7	–	24	.226
† 2017 MVC tournament winner Rankings from AP poll

The 2016–17 Evansville Purple Aces men's basketball team represented the University of Evansville during the 2016–17 NCAA Division I men's basketball season. The Purple Aces, led by 10th-year head coach Marty Simmons, played their home games at the Ford Center as members of the Missouri Valley Conference. They finished the season 16–17, 6–12 to finish in eighth place in MVC play. They defeated Indiana State in the MVC tournament before losing to Illinois State in the quarterfinals.

== Previous season ==
The Purple Aces finished the 2015–16 season with a record of 25–9, 12–6 in Missouri Valley play to finish in a tie for second place. They defeated Missouri State and Indiana State in the Missouri Valley tournament to advance to the championship game where they lost to Northern Iowa. Despite having 25 wins, they did not participate in a postseason tournament.

== Preseason ==
Evansville was picked to finish ninth in the conference's preseason poll.

== Offseason ==
=== Departures ===
Name	Number	Pos.	Height	Weight	Year	Hometown	Notes
Mislav Brzoja	5	G	6'4"	215	RS Junior	Zagreb, Croatia	Playing professional overseas in Europe
Adam Wing	12	G	6'4"	205	Senior	Morehead, KY	Graduated
Harris Brown	13	G	5'11"	175	Freshman	Indianapolis, IN	Transferred to Dodge City CC
D. J. Balentine	31	G	6'2"	210	Senior	Kokomo, IN	Graduated
Egidijus Mockevičius	55	C	6'10"	225	Senior	Kuršėnai, Lithuania	Graduated

=== Incoming transfers ===
Name	Number	Pos.	Height	Weight	Year	Hometown	Notes
Dalen Traore	15	C	6'9"	250	Junior	Ivory Coast	Junior college transferred from Miami Dade College.

=== 2016 recruiting class ===
College recruiting
Name	Hometown	School	Height	Weight	Commit date
Silas Adheke #40 C	Chattanooga, TN	Hamilton Heights Christian Academy	6 ft 8 in (2.03 m)	N/A	
Silas Adheke #40 C	Recruit ratings: Scout: Rivals: (77)				
Dru Smith; SG	Evansville, IN	Reitz Memorial High School	6 ft 3 in (1.91 m)	N/A	Sep 23, 2015
Dru Smith; SG	Recruit ratings: Scout: Rivals: (NR)				
Jaiveon Eaves; SG	Madisonville, KY	Madisonville North Hopkins High School	6 ft 3 in (1.91 m)	N/A	
Jaiveon Eaves; SG	Recruit ratings: Scout: Rivals: (NR)				
John Hall; SF	Philadelphia, PA	Standard of Excellence Academy	6 ft 8 in (2.03 m)	210 lb (95 kg)	
John Hall; SF	Recruit ratings: Scout: Rivals: (NR)				
Overall recruit ranking:
Note: In many cases, Scout, Rivals, 247Sports, On3, and ESPN may conflict in their listings of height and weight.; In these cases, the average was taken. ESPN grades are on a 100-point scale.; Sources: "2016 Team Ranking". Rivals.

== Roster ==
2016–17 Evansville Purple Aces men's basketball team
Players
Coaches

Pos.	#	Name	Height	Weight	Year	Previous school	Hometown
G	2	Christian Benzon	6 ft 4 in (1.93 m)	195 lb (88 kg)	Sr	The Rock School	Copenhagen, Denmark
G	3	Jaylon Brown	6 ft 0 in (1.83 m)	185 lb (84 kg)	Sr	Fishers	Fishers, IN
G	4	Jaiveon Eaves	6 ft 2 in (1.88 m)	200 lb (91 kg)	Fr	Madisonville-North Hopkins	Madisonville, KY
F	5	Solomon Hainna	6 ft 6 in (1.98 m)	195 lb (88 kg)	RS Jr	Palisades Charter; Midland College	Inglewood, CA
G	12	Dru Smith	6 ft 3 in (1.91 m)	195 lb (88 kg)	Fr	Reitz	Evansville, IN
C	14	Sergej Vucetic	7 ft 1 in (2.16 m)	238 lb (108 kg)	RS Sr	Aim; Nebraska	Vrbas, Serbia
C	15	Dalen Traore	6 ft 9 in (2.06 m)	230 lb (104 kg)	Jr	Northwood Temple Academy; Miami Dade College	Ivory Coast
F	23	Willie Wiley	6 ft 7 in (2.01 m)	215 lb (98 kg)	RS Sr	Vincennes	Springfield, IL
G	25	Duane Gibson	6 ft 3 in (1.91 m)	195 lb (88 kg)	RS Jr	Villa Angela-St. Joseph	Cleveland, OH
F	35	John Hall	6 ft 7 in (2.01 m)	215 lb (98 kg)	Fr	Standard of Excellence	Philadelphia, PA
F	44	David Howard	6 ft 8 in (2.03 m)	225 lb (102 kg)	RS Sr	Montgomery Bell	Nashville, TN
G/F	50	Blake Simmons	6 ft 5 in (1.96 m)	210 lb (95 kg)	Sr	Castle	Newburgh, IN

Head coach

- Marty Simmons (Evansville)

Assistant coach(es)

- Doug Novsek (Southern Illinois)
- Lennox Forrester (Evansville)
- Geoff Alexander (Western Illinois)

Legend

- (C) Team captain
- (S) Suspended
- (I) Ineligible
- (W) Walk-on
- Injured
- Current redshirt

Roster

== Schedule and results ==
Date time, TV	Rank^{#}	Opponent^{#}	Result	Record	Site (attendance) city, state
Non-conference regular season
11/11/2016*; 7:00 pm, ACC Extra		at No. 13 Louisville	L 47–78	0–1	KFC Yum! Center (21,129); Louisville, KY
11/14/2016*; 8:00 pm, ESPN3		Alcorn State	W 82–59	1–1	Ford Center (3,669); Evansville, IN
11/19/2016*; 12:00 pm, ESPN3		Morehead State	W 69–56	2–1	Ford Center (3,386); Evansville, IN
11/25/2016*; 5:00 pm		vs. Toledo; Challenge in Music City	L 79–83 ^{2OT}	2–2	Nashville Municipal Auditorium; Nashville, TN
11/26/2016*; 5:00 pm		vs. UNC Wilmington; Challenge in Music City	L 62–65	2–3	Nashville Municipal Auditorium; Nashville, TN
11/27/2016*; 5:30 pm		vs. Middle Tennessee; Challenge in Music City	L 55–66	2–4	Nashville Municipal Auditorium; Nashville, TN
11/30/2016*; 7:00 pm, ESPN3		Wabash	W 83–39	3–4	Ford Center (3,234); Evansville, IN
12/03/2016*; 1:00 pm, ESPN3		Boise State; MW–MVC Challenge	W 72–67	4–4	Ford Center (3,773); Evansville, IN
12/06/2016*; 7:00 pm, ESPN3		Bowling Green	W 69–66	5–4	Ford Center (3,513); Evansville, IN
12/10/2016*; 3:00 pm, ESPN3		Murray State	W 78–46	6–4	Ford Center (5,016); Evansville, IN
12/14/2016*; 7:00 pm, ESPN3		Norfolk State	W 85–66	7–4	Ford Center (3,312); Evansville, IN
12/17/2016*; 7:00 pm		at Austin Peay	W 77–69	8–4	Dunn Center (1,428); Clarksville, TN
12/22/2016*; 7:00 pm, ESPN3		Mount St. Joseph	W 68–55	9–4	Ford Center (4,017); Evansville, IN
Missouri Valley regular season
12/30/2016; 7:00 pm, ESPN3		at Illinois State	L 50–62	9–4 (0–1)	Redbird Arena (5,415); Bloomington, IL
01/01/2017; 3:00 pm, ESPN3		Northern Iowa	W 70–58	10–4 (1–1)	Ford Center (5,277); Evansville, IN
01/04/2017; 7:00 pm, ESPN3		Bradley	L 63–74	10–6 (1–2)	Ford Center (3,614); Evansville, IN
01/08/2017; 3:00 pm, ESPN3		at Drake	L 76–88	10–7 (1–3)	Knapp Center (2,688); Des Moines, IA
01/11/2017; 7:00 pm, ESPN3		at Missouri State	L 51–55	10–8 (1–4)	JQH Arena (3,253); Springfield, MO
01/14/2017; 1:00 pm, FSMW/CSNCH/ESPN3		Southern Illinois	L 61–73	10–9 (1–5)	Ford Center (4,803); Evansville, IN
01/17/2017; 8:00 pm, CBSSN		Wichita State	L 65–82	10–10 (1–6)	Ford Center (4,019); Evansville, IN
01/21/2017; 3:00 pm, ESPN3		at Loyola–Chicago	L 61–67	10–11 (1–7)	Joseph J. Gentile Arena (3,006); Chicago, IL
01/25/2017; 7:00 pm, ESPN3		at Northern Iowa	L 54–61	10–12 (1–8)	McLeod Center (3,782); Cedar Falls, IA
01/29/2017; 3:00 pm, ESPN3		Illinois State	L 59–69	10–13 (1–9)	Ford Center (5,428); Evansville, IN
02/01/2017; 6:00 pm, ESPN3		at Indiana State	L 84–85 ^{OT}	10–14 (1–10)	Hulman Center (3,669); Terre Haute, IN
02/04/2017; 3:00 pm, ESPN3		Missouri State	W 74–66	11–14 (2–10)	Ford Center (4,467); Evansville, IN
02/08/2017; 7:00 pm, ESPN3		Loyola–Chicago	W 60–58	12–14 (3–10)	Ford Center (3,436); Evansville, IN
02/11/2017; 3:00 pm, FSMW/CSNCH/ESPN3		at Southern Illinois	W 75–70	13–14 (4–10)	SIU Arena (5,490); Carbondale, IL
02/14/2017; 7:00 pm, ESPN3		Drake	W 87–70	14–14 (5–10)	Ford Center (3,639); Evansville, IN
02/18/2017; 1:00 pm, ESPN3		at Bradley	L 72–84	14–15 (5–11)	Carver Arena (5,968); Peoria, IL
02/21/2017; 7:00 pm, ESPN3		at No. 25 Wichita State	L 83–109	14–16 (5–12)	Charles Koch Arena (10,506); Wichita, KS
02/25/2017; 1:00 pm, ESPN3		Indiana State	W 65–63	15–16 (6–12)	Ford Center (4,913); Evansville, IN
Missouri Valley tournament
03/02/2017; 6:05 pm, ESPN3/FSMW/CSNC	(8)	vs. (9) Indiana State; First Round	W 83–72	16–16	Scottrade Center (5,057); St. Louis, MO
03/03/2017; 12:00 pm, ESPN3/FSMW/CSNC	(8)	vs. (1) Illinois State; Quarterfinals	L 69–80	16–17	Scottrade Center (8,648); St. Louis, MO
*Non-conference game. ^{#}Rankings from AP Poll. (#) Tournament seedings in parentheses. All times are in Central Time.
