= Jeff Rutter =

American basketball coach (born 1965)

Current position
- Title: Assistant coach
- Team: Western Michigan
- Conference: MAC

Biographical details
- Born: January 28, 1965 (age 61); West Allis, Wisconsin, U.S.

Playing career
- 1984–1986: Wisconsin–Waukesha
- 1986–1988: Winona State

Coaching career (HC unless noted)
- 1990–1995: North Dakota State (assistant)
- 1995–1996: Stetson (assistant)
- 1996–2003: Wisconsin–Parkside
- 2003–2006: Northern Iowa (assistant)
- 2006–2010: Iowa State (assistant)
- 2010-2013: Iowa State (Director of Basketball Operations)
- 2013–2016: Drake (assistant)
- 2016–2017: Drake (interim HC)
- 2017–2022: Miami (OH) (assistant)
- 2022–present: Western Michigan (assistant)

Head coaching record
- Overall: 77-133

Jeff Rutter (born January 28, 1965) is an American basketball coach. He currently serves as an assistant men's basketball coach at Bellarmine University. He was previously at Western Michigan. Rutter also served as the interim head coach at Drake from December 2016 to March 2017.

== Coaching history ==
Rutter has served as an assistant coach at the Division II and Division I levels. He moved with Greg McDermott from Northern Iowa to Iowa State in 2006 and stayed on as director of basketball operations at Iowa State after McDermott was replaced by Fred Hoiberg.

Following the December 2016 resignation of Ray Giacoletti, Rutter took his first Division I head coaching job as the interim head coach of Drake. Since Drake he has served as an assistant and Miami (OH) and Western Michigan

== Head coaching record ==
Record table
| Season | Team | Overall | Conference | Standing | Postseason |
|---|---|---|---|---|---|
Drake (Missouri Valley Conference) (Dec. 2016–2017)
| 2016–17 | Drake | 6–17* | 5–13* | T–9th | |
| Drake: | | 6–17 | 5–13 | | |
| Total: | | 14–40 | | | |
National champion Postseason invitational champion Conference regular season champion Conference regular season and conference tournament champion Division regular season champion Division regular season and conference tournament champion Conference tournament champion

*Took over as head coach for the rest of the season when Ray Giacoletti resigned on December 6, 2016. Drake's record for the 2016–17 season was 7–24 overall and 5–13 in the MVC.
