= Aundre Jackson =

American basketball player

Sparta Bertrange
- Position: Small forward
- League: Total League

Personal information
- Born: November 15, 1995 (age 31) Fort Worth, Texas
- Listed height: 6 ft 5 in (1.96 m)
- Listed weight: 230 lb (104 kg)

Career information
- High school: Kennedale (Kennedale, Texas)
- College: McLennan CC (2014–2016); Loyola Chicago (2016–2018)
- NBA draft: 2018: undrafted
- Playing career: 2018–present

Career history
- 2018–2019: Skallagrímur
- 2019: BC Kyiv
- 2019–2020: Apollon Limassol
- 2020–present: Sparta Bertrange

Career highlights
- MVC Sixth-Man of the Year (2017)

Aundre Jackson (born November 15, 1995) is an American professional basketball player for Sparta Bertrange of the Total League.

== Early life ==
Jackson was born in Fort Worth, Texas and grew up in Kennedale and was a star player at Kennedale High School.

== College career ==
Jackson started his college career with McLennan Community College in 2014 before transferring to Loyola University Chicago in 2016. In 2017 he was named the Missouri Valley Conference's Sixth Man of the Year. In 2018, he made it to the Final Four of the NCAA tournament.

== Club career ==
In July 2018, Jackson signed with Skallagrímur of the Úrvalsdeild karla. In 22 league games for Skallagrímur, he averaged 19.9 points and 8.3 rebounds.
