= 2016–17 Northern Iowa Panthers men's basketball team =

American college basketball season

2016–17 Northern Iowa Panthers men's basketball
- Conference: Missouri Valley Conference
- Record: 14–16 (9–9 MVC)
- Head coach: Ben Jacobson (11th season)
- Assistant coaches: P.J. Hogan; Erik Crawford; Kyle Green
- Home arena: McLeod Center

2016–17 Missouri Valley Conference men's basketball standings
	Conf.				Overall
Team	W		L	PCT	W		L	PCT
Illinois State	17	–	1	.944	28	–	7	.800
No. 19 Wichita State†	17	–	1	.944	31	–	5	.861
Northern Iowa	9	–	9	.500	14	–	16	.467
Southern Illinois	9	–	9	.500	17	–	16	.515
Loyola Chicago	8	–	10	.444	18	–	14	.563
Missouri State	7	–	11	.389	17	–	16	.515
Bradley	7	–	11	.389	13	–	20	.394
Evansville	6	–	12	.333	16	–	17	.485
Indiana State	5	–	13	.278	11	–	20	.355
Drake	5	–	13	.278	7	–	24	.226
† 2017 MVC tournament winner Rankings from AP poll

The 2016–17 Northern Iowa Panthers men's basketball team represented the University of Northern Iowa during the 2016–17 NCAA Division I men's basketball season. The Panthers, led by eleventh-year head coach Ben Jacobson, played their home games at the McLeod Center in Cedar Falls, IA as members of the Missouri Valley Conference. They finished the regular season 14–16, 9–9 in MVC play to finish in a tie for third place. As the No. 3 seed in the MVC tournament, they lost to Missouri State in the quarterfinals.

== Previous season ==
The Panthers finished the 2015–16 season with a record of 23–13, 11–7 in Missouri Valley play to finish in a tie for fourth place. They defeated Southern Illinois, Wichita State, and Evansville to win the Missouri Valley tournament and earn the conference's automatic bid to the NCAA tournament. As a No. 11 seed, they defeated Texas in the first round to advance to the second round, where they lost to Texas A&M.

== Preseason ==
The Panthers were picked to finish in third place in the MVC preseason poll. Jeremy Morgan was selected as preseason Missouri Valley Conference player of the year.

== Departures ==
Name	Number	Pos.	Height	Weight	Year	Hometown	Notes
Aarias Austin	1	G	6'4"	180	Junior	Gurnee, IL	Transferred to Minnesota State
Paul Jesperson	4	G	6'0"	206	RS senior	Merrill, WI	Graduated
Matt Bohannon	5	G	6'4"	195	Senior	Marion, IA	Graduated
Wes Washpun	11	G	6'1"	175	Senior	Cedar Rapids, IA	Graduated
Robert Kanar	22	G	6'1"	180	RS sophomore	Mundelein, IL	Transferred to Missouri–Kansas City

=== Incoming transfers ===
Name	Number	Pos.	Height	Weight	Year	Hometown	Previous school
Hunter Rhodes	21	G	6'0"	175	Junior	Canton, IL	Junior college transferred from Kirkwood CC
Jordan Ashton	23	G	6'4"	195	RS senior	Mount Pleantsant, MI	Transferred from Iowa State. Will be eligible to play immediately since Ashton graduated from Iowa State.

== 2016 recruiting class ==
College recruiting
Name	Hometown	School	Height	Weight	Commit date
Juwan McCloud; PG	Germantown, WI	Germantown High School	5 ft 11 in (1.80 m)	150 lb (68 kg)	May 9, 2015
Juwan McCloud; PG	Recruit ratings: Scout: Rivals: (NR)				
Isaiah Brown; PG	Flower Mound, TX	Flower Mound High School	6 ft 5 in (1.96 m)	170 lb (77 kg)	Nov 15, 2015
Isaiah Brown; PG	Recruit ratings: Scout: Rivals: (NR)				
Tanner Lohaus; SF	North Liberty, IA	West High School	6 ft 7 in (2.01 m)	205 lb (93 kg)	May 19, 2015
Tanner Lohaus; SF	Recruit ratings: Scout: Rivals: (NR)				
Overall recruit ranking:
Note: In many cases, Scout, Rivals, 247Sports, On3, and ESPN may conflict in their listings of height and weight.; In these cases, the average was taken. ESPN grades are on a 100-point scale.; Sources: "2016 Team Ranking". Rivals.

=== 2017 recruiting class ===
College recruiting (2017)
Name	Hometown	School	Height	Weight	Commit date
Austin Phyfe; PF	Waverly, IA	Waverly-Shell Rock High School	6 ft 8 in (2.03 m)	225 lb (102 kg)	Nov 5, 2015
Austin Phyfe; PF	Recruit ratings: Scout: Rivals: (NR)				
Overall recruit ranking:
Note: In many cases, Scout, Rivals, 247Sports, On3, and ESPN may conflict in their listings of height and weight.; In these cases, the average was taken. ESPN grades are on a 100-point scale.; Sources: "2017 Team Ranking". Rivals.

== Roster ==
2016–17 Northern Iowa Panthers men's basketball team
Players
Coaches

Pos.	#	Name	Height	Weight	Year	Previous school	Hometown
G	1	Adam McDermott (W) (redshirt)	6 ft 4 in (1.93 m)	190 lb (86 kg)	So	Xavier	Cedar Rapids, IA
F	2	Klint Carlson	6 ft 7 in (2.01 m)	222 lb (101 kg)	RS Jr	Waverly-Shell Rock	Waverly, IA
C	3	Ted Friedman	6 ft 9 in (2.06 m)	245 lb (111 kg)	RS Jr	Ankeny	Ankeny, IA
G	5	Rafael de Souza (W)	6 ft 1 in (1.85 m)	180 lb (82 kg)	Jr	Gulf Coast State College	Jundiaí, Brazil
F	12	Lincoln Conrey	6 ft 7 in (2.01 m)	218 lb (99 kg)	RS Fr	Waterloo West	Waterloo, IA
G	13	Juwan McCloud	5 ft 11 in (1.8 m)	173 lb (78 kg)	Fr	Germantown	Germantown, WI
C	15	Justin Dahl	6 ft 11 in (2.11 m)	250 lb (113 kg)	RS Fr	Holy Family	Carver, MN
G	20	Jeremy Morgan	6 ft 5 in (1.96 m)	195 lb (88 kg)	Sr	Iowa City West	Coralville, IA
G	21	Hunter Rhodes	6 ft 0 in (1.83 m)	175 lb (79 kg)	Jr	Canton; Kirkwood CC	Canton, IL
F	22	Tanner Lohaus	6 ft 7 in (2.01 m)	205 lb (93 kg)	Fr	Iowa City West	North Liberty, IA
G	23	Jordan Ashton	6 ft 4 in (1.93 m)	192 lb (87 kg)	RS Sr	Mount Pleasant; Iowa State	Mount Pleasant, IA
G	24	Isaiah Brown	6 ft 5 in (1.96 m)	172 lb (78 kg)	Fr	Flower Mound	Flower Mound, TX
F	25	Bennett Koch	6 ft 9 in (2.06 m)	234 lb (106 kg)	RS Jr	Ashwaubenon	Ashwaubenon, WI
G	30	Spencer Haldeman	6 ft 1 in (1.85 m)	173 lb (78 kg)	RS Fr	Western Dubuque	Peosta, IA
G	33	Wyatt Lohaus	6 ft 2 in (1.88 m)	180 lb (82 kg)	Jr	Iowa City West	North Liberty, IA
F	34	Luke McDonnell	6 ft 9 in (2.06 m)	218 lb (99 kg)	RS Fr	Dubuque Senior	Dubuque, IA

Head coach

- Ben Jacobson (North Dakota)

Assistant coach(es)

- P.J. Hogan (Morningside)
- Erik Crawford (Iowa State)
- Kyle Green (Hamline)

Legend

- (C) Team captain
- (S) Suspended
- (I) Ineligible
- (W) Walk-on
- Injured
- Current redshirt

Roster

== Schedule and results ==
Date time, TV	Rank^{#}	Opponent^{#}	Result	Record	Site (attendance) city, state
Exhibition
10/28/2016*; 7:00 pm, ESPN3		Bemidji State	W 71–48		McLeod Center (3,737); Cedar Falls, IA
Non-conference regular season
11/12/2016*; 11:00 am, ESPN3		Coe	W 74–37	1–0	McLeod Center (4,053); Cedar Falls, IA
11/17/2016*; 3:30 pm, ESPNU		vs. Arizona State; Tire Pros Invitational quarterfinals	W 82–63	2–0	HP Field House; Orlando, FL
11/18/2016*; 6:00 pm, ESPNU		vs. Oklahoma; Tire Pros Invitational semifinals	W 73–67 ^{OT}	3–0	HP Field House; Orlando, FL
11/20/2016*; 6:30 pm, ESPN2		vs. No. 11 Xavier; Tire Pros Invitational championship	L 59–67	3–1	HP Field House; Orlando, FL
11/26/2016*; 11:00 am, FSN		at No. 9 Xavier; Tire Pros Invitational non-bracketed game	L 42–64	3–2	Cintas Center (10,028); Cincinnati, OH
11/30/2016*; 7:00 pm, PSN/ESPN3		George Mason	L 50–54	3–3	McLeod Center (4,302); Cedar Falls, IA
12/03/2016*; 5:00 pm, Campus Insiders/MWN		at Wyoming; MW–MVC Challenge	L 73–81	3–4	Arena-Auditorium (5,539); Laramie, WY
12/07/2016*; 7:00 pm, PSN/ESPN3		South Dakota State	W 86–58	4–4	McLeod Center (3,922); Cedar Falls, IA
12/10/2016*; 7:00 pm, PSN/ESPN3		North Dakota	W 78–70	5–4	McLeod Center (4,521); Cedar Falls, IA
12/17/2016*; 3:30 pm, ESPN3		vs. Iowa; Big Four Classic	L 46–69	5–5	Wells Fargo Arena (15,028); Des Moines, IA
12/21/2016*; 7:00 pm, ESPN2		at No. 8 North Carolina	L 42–85	5–6	Dean Smith Center (18,033); Chapel Hill, NC
Missouri Valley Conference regular season
12/28/2016; 8:00 pm, FSMW/CSNC		Missouri State	L 64–68	5–7 (0–1)	McLeod Center (5,448); Cedar Falls, IA
01/01/2017; 3:00 pm, ESPN3		at Evansville	L 58–70	5–8 (0–2)	Ford Center (5,277); Evansville, IN
01/04/2017; 6:00 pm, CSNC		at Loyola–Chicago	L 66–77	5–9 (0–3)	Joseph J. Gentile Arena (1,269); Chicago, IL
01/08/2017; 3:00 pm, ESPNU		Wichita State	L 66–80	5–10 (0–4)	McLeod Center (5,547); Cedar Falls, IA
01/11/2017; 8:00 pm, FSMW/CSNC		at Bradley	L 61–72	5–11 (0–5)	Carver Arena (5,138); Peoria, IL
01/15/2017; 3:00 pm, ESPN3		Drake	W 79–60	6–11 (1–5)	McLeod Center (4,652); Cedar Falls, IA
01/18/2017; 7:00 pm, FSMW/CSNC		Loyola–Chicago	W 72–69 ^{2OT}	7–11 (2–5)	McLeod Center (3,934); Cedar Falls, IA
01/21/2017; 3:00 pm, ESPN3		at Southern Illinois	W 58–57	8–11 (3–5)	SIU Arena (5,015); Carbondale, IL
01/25/2017; 7:00 pm, PSN/ESPN3		Evansville	W 61–54	9–11 (4–5)	McLeod Center (3,782); Cedar Falls, IA
01/28/2017; 1:00 pm, CBSSN		at Drake	W 71–63	10–11 (5–5)	Knapp Center (5,237); Des Moines, IA
02/01/2017; 8:00 pm, FSMW/CSNC		at Illinois State	L 51–57	10–12 (5–6)	Redbird Arena (5,732); Normal, IL
02/04/2017; 1:00 pm, CBSSN		Indiana State	W 65–60	11–12 (6–6)	McLeod Center (4,982); Cedar Falls, IA
02/08/2017; 7:00 pm, ESPN3		Southern Illinois	W 49–41	12–12 (7–6)	McLeod Center (3,921); Cedar Falls, IA
02/12/2017; 3:00 pm, ESPN3		at Missouri State	W 55–52	13–12 (8–6)	JQH Arena (4,165); Springfield, MO
02/15/2017; 7:00 pm, PSN/ESPN3		Bradley	W 64–61	14–12 (9–6)	McLeod Center (4,225); Cedar Falls, IA
02/18/2017; 11:00 am, ESPN2		at Wichita State	L 44–73	14–13 (9–7)	Charles Koch Arena (10,506); Wichita, KS
02/22/2017; 6:00 pm, ESPN3		at Indiana State	L 59–69	14–14 (9–8)	Hulman Center (3,778); Terre Haute, IN
02/25/2017; 1:00 pm, CBSSN		Illinois State	L 42–63	14–15 (9–9)	McLeod Center (5,677); Cedar Falls, IA
Missouri Valley tournament
03/03/2017; 8:35 pm, ESPN3/FSMW/CSNC	(3)	vs. (6) Missouri State; Quarterfinals	L 64–70	14–16	Scottrade Center (9,124); St. Louis, MO
*Non-conference game. ^{#}Rankings from AP Poll. (#) Tournament seedings in parentheses. W=West Region. All times are in Central Time.

Panther Sports Network (PSN) Cedar Falls Utilities Ch. 15/HD415; KCRG-TV Ch. 9.2; WHO-DT Ch. 13.2; KGCW Ch. 26, Time Warner CableKC Channel 324, Comcast SportsNet Chicago
