= 2015–16 Drake Bulldogs men's basketball team =

American college basketball season

2015–16 Drake Bulldogs men's basketball
- Conference: Missouri Valley Conference
- Record: 7–24 (2–16 MVC)
- Head coach: Ray Giacoletti (3rd season)
- Assistant coaches: Jeff Rutter; Todd Townsend; Dave Buchanan
- Home arena: Knapp Center

2015–16 Missouri Valley Conference men's basketball standings
	Conf.				Overall
Team	W		L	PCT	W		L	PCT
Wichita State	16	–	2	.889	26	–	9	.743
Evansville	12	–	6	.667	25	–	9	.735
Illinois State	12	–	6	.667	18	–	14	.563
Southern Illinois	11	–	7	.611	22	–	10	.688
Northern Iowa †	11	–	7	.611	23	–	13	.639
Indiana State	8	–	10	.444	15	–	17	.469
Missouri State	8	–	10	.444	13	–	19	.406
Loyola Chicago	7	–	11	.389	15	–	17	.469
Bradley	3	–	15	.167	5	–	27	.156
Drake	2	–	16	.111	7	–	24	.226
† 2016 MVC tournament winner

The 2015–16 Drake Bulldogs men's basketball team represented Drake University during the 2015–16 NCAA Division I men's basketball season. The Bulldogs, led by third year head coach Ray Giacoletti, played their home games at the Knapp Center and were members of the Missouri Valley Conference. They finished the season 7–24, 2–16 in Missouri Valley play to finish in last place. They lost in the first round of the Missouri Valley tournament to Missouri State.

== Previous season ==
The Bulldogs finished the season 9–22, 6–12 in MVC play to finish in seventh place. They lost in the first round of the Missouri Valley tournament to Bradley.

== Departures ==
Name	Number	Pos.	Height	Weight	Year	Hometown	Notes
Gary Ricks, Jr.	2	G	6'1"	181	RS Senior	Los Angeles, CA	Graduated
Jordan Daniels	3	G	5'10"	150	Senior	Fontana, CA	Graduated & transferred to California Baptist
Trevor Berkeley	10	F	6'6"	200	Senior	Tucker, GA	Graduated
Chris Caird	25	G/F	6'6"	232	Senior	Daventry, England	Graduated

== Incoming recruits ==
College recruiting information
Name	Hometown	School	Height	Weight	Commit date
Nick McGlynn; PF	Stoughton, WI	Stoughton High School	6 ft 8 in (2.03 m)	210 lb (95 kg)	Jun 17, 2014
Nick McGlynn; PF	Recruit ratings: Scout: Rivals: (NR)				
Billy Wampler; SG	Eau Claire, WI	Regis High School	6 ft 6 in (1.98 m)	200 lb (91 kg)	Aug 3, 2014
Billy Wampler; SG	Recruit ratings: Scout: Rivals: (NR)				
Johannes Dolven; PF	Oslo, Norway	WANG Toppidrett	6 ft 8 in (2.03 m)	225 lb (102 kg)	Aug 27, 2014
Johannes Dolven; PF	Recruit ratings: Scout: Rivals: (NR)				
Dominik Olejniczak; C	Toruń, Poland	SMS Cetniewo Academy	7 ft 0 in (2.13 m)	230 lb (100 kg)	NA
Dominik Olejniczak; C	Recruit ratings: Scout: Rivals: (NR)				
Overall recruit ranking:
Note: In many cases, Scout, Rivals, 247Sports, On3, and ESPN may conflict in their listings of height and weight.; In these cases, the average was taken. ESPN grades are on a 100-point scale.; Sources: "2015 Team Ranking". Rivals.

== Roster ==
2015–16 Drake Bulldogs men's basketball team
Players
Coaches

Pos.	#	Name	Height	Weight	Year	Previous school	Hometown
G	0	C. J. Rivers	6 ft 2 in (1.88 m)	187 lb (85 kg)	So	Cahokia	Cahokia, IL
G	1	Karl Madison	5 ft 11 in (1.8 m)	174 lb (79 kg)	RS Sr	Lanphier	Springfield, IL
F	2	Bill Wampler	6 ft 6 in (1.98 m)	200 lb (91 kg)	Fr	Regis	Eau Claire, WI
G	3	Graham Woodward	6 ft 0 in (1.83 m)	182 lb (83 kg)	RS So	Penn State; Edina HS	Edina, MN
C	11	Jacob Jensen Enevold	7 ft 0 in (2.13 m)	246 lb (112 kg)	Jr	Falkonergardens Gymnasium	Lunderskov, Denmark
G	12	Reed Timmer	6 ft 1 in (1.85 m)	185 lb (84 kg)	So	Eisenhower	New Berlin, WI
G	14	A. J. Rutter (W)	6 ft 1 in (1.85 m)	170 lb (77 kg)	RS So	Glibert	Ames, IA
F	22	Casey Schlatter	6 ft 10 in (2.08 m)	207 lb (94 kg)	RS Fr	Iowa Falls Alden	Iowa Falls, IA
G	23	Ore Arogundade	6 ft 3 in (1.91 m)	185 lb (84 kg)	So	St. Viator	Arlington Heights, IL
F	25	Johannes Dolven	6 ft 8 in (2.03 m)	230 lb (104 kg)	Fr	XXXX	Oslo, Norway
F	31	Kale Abrahamson	6 ft 8 in (2.03 m)	221 lb (100 kg)	RS Jr	Northwestern; Valley HS	West Des Moines, IA
C	32	Kory Kuenstling	6 ft 11 in (2.11 m)	232 lb (105 kg)	So	Dunkerton Community School	Dunkerton, IA
F	35	Nick McGlynn	6 ft 8 in (2.03 m)	223 lb (101 kg)	Fr	Stoughton	Stoughton, WI
C	44	Dominik Olejniczak	7 ft 0 in (2.13 m)	249 lb (113 kg)	Fr	XXXX	Toruń, Poland

Head coach

- Ray Giacoletti (Minot State)

Assistant coach(es)

- Jeff Rutter (Winona State)
- Todd Townsend (Marquette)
- Dave Buchanan (UW–La Crosse)

Legend

- (C) Team captain
- (S) Suspended
- (I) Ineligible
- (W) Walk-on
- Injured
- Current redshirt

Roster

== Schedule ==
Date time, TV	Opponent	Result	Record	Site (attendance) city, state
Exhibition
November 7*; 4:00 pm, ESPN3	McKendree	W 95–78		Knapp Center (2,666); Des Moines, IA
Non-conference regular season
November 13*; 7:00 pm, ESPN3	Simpson	W 97–52	1–0	Knapp Center (3,140); Des Moines, IA
November 16*; 7:00 pm, ESPN3	at Tulane	L 74–79 ^{OT}	1–1	Devlin Fieldhouse (1,411); New Orleans, LA
November 21*; 7:00 pm	UMKC	L 73–79	1–2	Knapp Center (2,862); Des Moines, IA
November 23*; 5:00 pm	vs. WKU; Gulf Coast Showcase quarterfinals	W 81–79 ^{OT}	2–2	Germain Arena (523); Estero, FL
November 24*; 7:30 pm	vs. Weber State; Gulf Coast Showcase semifinals	L 58–74	2–3	Germain Arena (1,053); Estero, FL
November 25*; 6:00 pm	vs. Pepperdine; Gulf Coast Showcase 3rd place game	W 69–53	3–3	Germain Arena (1,077); Estero, FL
November 28*; 2:00 pm, ESPN3	UIC	W 83–62	4–3	Knapp Center (2,593); Des Moines, IA
December 5*; 3:00 pm, ESPN3	at Bowling Green	L 63–75	4–4	Stroh Center (1,446); Bowling Green, OH
December 9*; 7:00 pm, ESPN3	DePaul	L 71–74	4–5	Knapp Center (3,262); Des Moines, IA
December 12*; 6:00 pm	at Nevada; MW–MVC Challenge	L 71–79	4–6	Lawlor Events Center (5,541); Reno, NV
December 19*; 3:30 pm, ESPN3	vs. Iowa; Big Four Classic	L 64–70	4–7	Wells Fargo Arena (15,424); Des Moines, IA
December 22*; 7:00 pm, ESPN3	Abilene Christian	W 87–70	5–7	Knapp Center (2,701); Des Moines, IA
Missouri Valley Conference regular season
December 31; 1:00 pm, ESPNU	at Wichita State	L 47–67	5–8 (0–1)	Charles Koch Arena (10,506); Wichita, KS
January 3; 1:00 pm, ESPN3	Illinois State	L 62–67	5–9 (0–2)	Knapp Center (2,803); Des Moines, IA
January 6; 7:00 pm, ESPN3	Indiana State	L 59–79	5–10 (0–3)	Knapp Center (2,717); Des Moines, IA
January 9; 7:00 pm, ESPN3	at Northern Iowa	L 44–77	5–11 (0–4)	McLeod Center (5,105); Cedar Falls, IA
January 12; 7:00 pm, ESPN3	at Evansville	L 65–84	5–12 (0–5)	Ford Center (4,011); Evansville, IN
January 17; 3:00 pm, ESPNU	Southern Illinois	L 76–81	5–13 (0–6)	Knapp Center (3,136); Des Moines, IA
January 20; 7:00 pm, ESPN3	Missouri State	L 70–79	5–14 (0–7)	Knapp Center (2,561); Des Moines, IA
January 23; 1:00 pm, ESPN3	at Loyola–Chicago	L 63–68	5–15 (0–8)	Joseph J. Gentile Arena (2,925); Chicago, IL
January 26; 7:00 pm, ESPN3	at Illinois State	L 64–76	5–16 (0–9)	Redbird Arena (4,182); Normal, IL
January 30; 2:00 pm, ESPN3	Bradley	W 80–70	6–16 (1–9)	Knapp Center (3,254); Des Moines, IA
February 2; 6:00 pm, ESPN3	at Indiana State	L 56–63	6-17 (1-10)	Hulman Center (3,409); Terre Haute, IN
February 6; 1:00 pm, CBSSN	Northern Iowa	L 66–82	6–18 (1–11)	Knapp Center (4,724); Des Moines, IA
February 9; 7:00 pm, ESPN3	Wichita State	L 48–74	6–19 (1–12)	Knapp Center (3,317); Des Moines, IA
February 13; 3:00 pm, ESPN3	at Southern Illinois	L 60–75	6–20 (1–13)	SIU Arena (5,474); Carbondale, IL
February 17; 8:00 pm, ESPN3	Evansville	L 74–80	6–21 (1–14)	Knapp Center (2,790); Des Moines, IA
February 20; 8:00 pm, ESPN3	at Bradley	L 70–73	6–22 (1–15)	Carver Arena (7,149); Peoria, IL
February 24; 7:00 pm, ESPN3	at Missouri State	L 52–61	6–23 (1–16)	JQH Arena; Springfield, MO
February 27; 1:00 pm, ESPN3	Loyola–Chicago	W 69–59 ^{OT}	7–23 (2–16)	Knapp Center (3,362); Des Moines, IA
Missouri Valley tournament
March 3; 8:30 pm, ESPN3	vs. Missouri State; First round	L 67–69	7–24	Scottrade Center (6,929); St. Louis, MO
*Non-conference game. ^{#}Rankings from AP Poll. (#) Tournament seedings in parentheses. All times are in Central Time.
