= 2015–16 Missouri State Bears basketball team =

American college basketball season

2015–16 Missouri State Bears basketball
- Conference: Missouri Valley Conference
- Record: 13–19 (8–10 MVC)
- Head coach: Paul Lusk (5th season)
- Assistant coaches: Brad Korn; Matt Sligh; Corey Gipson
- Home arena: JQH Arena

2015–16 Missouri Valley Conference men's basketball standings
	Conf.				Overall
Team	W		L	PCT	W		L	PCT
Wichita State	16	–	2	.889	26	–	9	.743
Evansville	12	–	6	.667	25	–	9	.735
Illinois State	12	–	6	.667	18	–	14	.563
Southern Illinois	11	–	7	.611	22	–	10	.688
Northern Iowa †	11	–	7	.611	23	–	13	.639
Indiana State	8	–	10	.444	15	–	17	.469
Missouri State	8	–	10	.444	13	–	19	.406
Loyola Chicago	7	–	11	.389	15	–	17	.469
Bradley	3	–	15	.167	5	–	27	.156
Drake	2	–	16	.111	7	–	24	.226
† 2016 MVC tournament winner

The 2015–16 Missouri State Bears basketball team represented Missouri State University during the 2015–16 NCAA Division I men's basketball season. The Bears, led by fifth year head coach Paul Lusk, played their home games at JQH Arena and were members of the Missouri Valley Conference. They finished the season 13–19, 8–10 in Missouri Valley play to finish in a tie for sixth place. They defeated Drake in the first round of the Missouri Valley tournament to advance to the quarterfinals where they lost to Evansville.

== Previous season ==
The Bears finished the season 11–20, 5–13 in MVC play to finish in eighth place. They lost in the first round of the Missouri Valley tournament to Southern Illinois.

== Departures ==
Name	Number	Pos.	Height	Weight	Year	Hometown	Notes
Ron Mvouika	10	G/F	6'6"	201	Senior	Paris, France	Graduated
Marcus Marshall	11	G	6'3"	190	Junior	Saint Paul, MN	Transferred to Nevada
Cameron Maes	12	G	6'4"	200	Freshman	Springfield, MO	Left the team
Gavin Thurman	20	F	6'7"	226	Junior	Wichita, KS	Transferred to Newman
Christian Kirk	42	F	6'8"	218	Senior	Springfield, MO	Graduated

=== Incoming transfers ===
Name	Number	Pos.	Height	Weight	Year	Hometown	Previous school
Dequon Miller	4	G	5'11"	165	Junior	Charleston, WV	Junior college transfer from Motlow State Community College

== Incoming recruits ==
College recruiting information
Name	Hometown	School	Height	Weight	Commit date
Jarred Dixon; PG	Lee's Summit, MO	Lee's Summit West High School	6 ft 3 in (1.91 m)	170 lb (77 kg)	Aug 2, 2014
Jarred Dixon; PG	Recruit ratings: Scout: Rivals: (NR)				
Obediah Church; SF	Springfield, IL	Springfield High School	6 ft 8 in (2.03 m)	200 lb (91 kg)	Sep 15, 2014
Obediah Church; SF	Recruit ratings: Scout: Rivals: (NR)				
Ryan Kreklow; SG	Columbia, MO	Rock Bridge High School	6 ft 3 in (1.91 m)	185 lb (84 kg)	Oct 15, 2014
Ryan Kreklow; SG	Recruit ratings: Scout: Rivals: (NR)				
Overall recruit ranking:
Note: In many cases, Scout, Rivals, 247Sports, On3, and ESPN may conflict in their listings of height and weight.; In these cases, the average was taken. ESPN grades are on a 100-point scale.; Sources: "2015 Team Ranking". Rivals.

== Roster ==
2015–16 Missouri State Bears men's basketball team
Players
Coaches

Pos.	#	Name	Height	Weight	Year	Previous school	Hometown
F	1	Robin Thompson	6 ft 6 in (1.98 m)	220 lb (100 kg)	RS Fr	MICDS	St. Louis, MO
G	2	Austin Ruder	6 ft 3 in (1.91 m)	190 lb (86 kg)	Jr	Nixa	Nixa, MO
F	3	Loomis Gerring	6 ft 5 in (1.96 m)	205 lb (93 kg)	Sr	Grandview; Vincennes	Grandview, MO
G	4	Dequon Miller	5 ft 10 in (1.78 m)	175 lb (79 kg)	Jr	Capital; Motlow State CC	Charleston, WV
F	5	Onediah Church	6 ft 8 in (2.03 m)	200 lb (91 kg)	Fr	Springfield	Springfield, IL
G	11	Jarred Dixon	6 ft 3 in (1.91 m)	200 lb (91 kg)	Fr	Lee's Summit West	Kansas City, MO
G	20	Ryan Kreklow	6 ft 3 in (1.91 m)	185 lb (84 kg)	Fr	Rock Bridge	Columbia, MO
G	23	Dorrian Williams	6 ft 3 in (1.91 m)	190 lb (86 kg)	Sr	Douglass HS	Oklahoma City, OK
G	24	Shawn Roundtree	6 ft 0 in (1.83 m)	185 lb (84 kg)	So	Edwardsville HS	Edwardsville, IL
F	25	Jordan Martin	6 ft 8 in (2.03 m)	240 lb (109 kg)	Jr	Central; John A. Logan College	St. Louis, MO
F	30	Camyn Boone	6 ft 6 in (1.98 m)	240 lb (109 kg)	Sr	Mountain View HS; Mesa CC	Seattle, WA
G/F	33	Chris Kendrix	6 ft 5 in (1.96 m)	185 lb (84 kg)	So	Willard HS	Willard, MO
C	50	Tyler McCullough	6 ft 11 in (2.11 m)	246 lb (112 kg)	Jr	Fayetteville HS	Fayetteville, AR

Head coach

- Paul Lusk (Southern Illinois)

Assistant coach(es)

- Brad Korn (Southern Illinois)
- Matt Sligh (Covenant College)
- Corey Gipson (Austin Peay)

Legend

- (C) Team captain
- (S) Suspended
- (I) Ineligible
- (W) Walk-on
- Injured
- Current redshirt

Roster

== Schedule ==
Date time, TV	Opponent	Result	Record	Site (attendance) city, state
Exhibition
11/07/2015*; 2:05 pm	William Jewell	W 88–62		JQH Arena; Springfield, MO
Non-conference regular season
11/13/2015*; 7:00 pm	at Oral Roberts	L 65–80	0–1	Mabee Center (3,243); Tulsa, OK
11/19/2015*; 1:00 pm, ESPNU	vs. No. 22 Butler; Puerto Rico Tip-Off quarterfinals	L 59–93	0–2	Roberto Clemente Coliseum (1,601); San Juan, PR
11/20/2015*; 9:30 am, ESPNU	vs. Minnesota; Puerto Rico Tip-Off consolation 2nd round	L 69–74	0–3	Roberto Clemente Coliseum (1,814); San Juan, PR
11/22/2015*; 11:00 am, ESPN3	vs. Mississippi State; Puerto Rico Tip-Off 7th place game	L 70–84	0–4	Roberto Clemente Coliseum; San Juan, PR
11/27/2015*; 2:05 pm, ESPN3	Williams Woods	W 77–56	1–4	JQH Arena (2,937); Springfield, MO
12/01/2015*; 7:05 pm, ESPN3	Utah State; MW–MWC Challenge	L 68–69	1–5	JQH Arena (3,694); Springfield, MO
12/05/2015*; 2:30 pm, FSSW	at Oklahoma State	W 64–63	2–5	Gallagher-Iba Arena (4,651); Stillwater, OK
12/10/2015*; 7:05 pm, ESPN3	IUPUI	W 88–74	3–5	JQH Arena (4,113); Springfield, MO
12/13/2015*; 2:05 pm, ESPN3	Tulsa	L 61–70	3–6	JQH Arena (4,052); Springfield, MO
12/16/2015*; 7:05 pm	Oral Roberts	W 85–66	4–6	JQH Arena (4,079); Springfield, MO
12/19/2015*; 1:35 pm	at Valparaiso	L 45–74	4–7	Athletics–Recreation Center (3,458); Valparaiso, IN
12/22/2015*; 7:05 pm	Southeast Missouri State	L 74–78	4–8	JQH Arena (4,189); Springfield, MO
Missouri Valley Conference regular season
12/30/2015; 7:00 pm, ESPN3	at Illinois State	L 61–74	4–9 (0–1)	Redbird Arena (5,680); Normal, IL
01/02/2016; 3:00 pm, ESPN3	Evansville	L 59–76	4–10 (0–2)	JQH Arena (4,023); Springfield, MO
01/06/2016; 7:05 pm, ESPN3	Northern Iowa	W 59–58	5–10 (1–2)	JQH Arena (4,297); Springfield, MO
01/09/2016; 3:00 pm, ESPN3	at Loyola–Chicago	W 56–54	6–10 (2–2)	Joseph J. Gentile Arena (1,128); Chicago, IL
01/13/2016; 8:00 pm, ESPN3	Wichita State	L 62–78	6–11 (2–3)	JQH Arena (7,684); Springfield, MO
01/16/2016; 8:00 pm, ESPN3	at Bradley	W 61–42	7–11 (3–3)	Carver Arena (6,076); Peoria, IL
01/20/2016; 7:05 pm, ESPN3	at Drake	W 79–70	8–11 (4–3)	Knapp Center (2,561); Des Moines, IA
01/24/2016; 3:00 pm, ESPN3	Southern Illinois	L 65–80	8–12 (4–4)	JQH Arena (4,835); Springfield, MO
01/27/2016; 6:00 pm, ESPN3	at Indiana State	L 59–68	8–13 (4–5)	Hulman Center (3,501); Terre Haute, IN
01/30/2016; 3:05 pm, ESPN3	Illinois State	W 84–81 ^{OT}	9–13 (5–5)	JQH Arena (3,546); Springfield, MO
02/02/2016; 7:05 pm, ESPN3	Bradley	W 77–71	10–13 (6–5)	JQH Arena (3,723); Springfield, MO
02/06/2016; 11:00 am, ESPN3	at Evansville	L 64–83	10–14 (6–6)	Ford Center; Evansville, IN
02/10/2016; 7:00 pm, ESPN3	at Northern Iowa	L 69–83	10–15 (6–7)	McLeod Center (5,755); Cedar Falls, IA
02/13/2016; 3:05 pm, ESPN3	Indiana State	W 89–85 ^{OT}	11–15 (7–7)	JQH Arena (4,400); Springfield, MO
02/18/2016; 6:00 pm, CBSSN	at Wichita State	L 68–99	11–16 (7–8)	Charles Koch Arena (10,506); Wichita, KS
02/21/2016; 3:00 pm, ESPNU/ESPN3	Loyola–Chicago	L 62–75	11–17 (7–9)	JQH Arena (3,385); Springfield, MO
02/24/2016; 7:05 pm, ESPN3	Drake	W 61–52	12–17 (8–9)	JQH Arena; Springfield, MO
02/27/2016; 7:00 pm, ESPN3	at Southern Illinois	L 68–78	12–18 (8–10)	SIU Arena (6,012); Carbondale, IL
Missouri Valley tournament
03/03/2016; 8:30 pm, ESPN3	vs. Drake; First round	W 69–67	13–18	Scottrade Center (6,929); St. Louis, MO
03/04/2016; 6:00 pm, ESPN3	vs. Evansville; Quarterfinals	L 56–66	13–19	Scottrade Center (8,468); St. Louis, MO
*Non-conference game. ^{#}Rankings from AP Poll. (#) Tournament seedings in parentheses. All times are in Central Time.
