= 2015–16 Illinois State Redbirds men's basketball team =

American college basketball season

2015–16 Illinois State Redbirds men's basketball
- Conference: Missouri Valley Conference
- Record: 18–14 (12–6 MVC)
- Head coach: Dan Muller (4th season)
- Assistant coaches: Luke Yaklich; Dean Oliver; Jeremy Ballard
- Home arena: Doug Collins Court at Redbird Arena

2015–16 Missouri Valley Conference men's basketball standings
	Conf.				Overall
Team	W		L	PCT	W		L	PCT
Wichita State	16	–	2	.889	26	–	9	.743
Evansville	12	–	6	.667	25	–	9	.735
Illinois State	12	–	6	.667	18	–	14	.563
Southern Illinois	11	–	7	.611	22	–	10	.688
Northern Iowa †	11	–	7	.611	23	–	13	.639
Indiana State	8	–	10	.444	15	–	17	.469
Missouri State	8	–	10	.444	13	–	19	.406
Loyola Chicago	7	–	11	.389	15	–	17	.469
Bradley	3	–	15	.167	5	–	27	.156
Drake	2	–	16	.111	7	–	24	.226
† 2016 MVC tournament winner

The 2015–16 Illinois State Redbirds men's basketball team represented Illinois State University during the 2015–16 NCAA Division I men's basketball season. The Redbirds, led by fourth-year head coach Dan Muller, played their home games at Redbird Arena in Normal, Illinois as a member of the Missouri Valley Conference. They finished the season 18–14, 12–6 in conference play, to finish in a tie for second place. As the number three seed in the MVC tournament, they were defeated by Indiana State in their quarterfinal game.

== Previous season ==
The Redbirds finished the 2014–15 season 22–13, 11–7 in conference play, to finish in a tie for third place. For the Missouri Valley tournament they were the number four seed, defeating Evansville in a quarterfinal game and eighth ranked Wichita State in a semifinal game before succumbing to eleventh ranked Northern Iowa in the final. They received an at-large bid to the National Invitation Tournament where they won over Green Bay in the first round before losing to Old Dominion in the second round.

== Offseason ==
=== Departures ===
Name	#	Pos.	Height	Weight	Year	Hometown	Comment
Bobby Hunter	4	G	5'10"	194	RS Sr	Reno, NV	Graduation
John Jones	10	C	6'9"	260	Sr	Saint Michael, Barbados	Graduation
Daishon Knight	3	G	6'1"	175	Sr	Baltimore, MD	Graduation
Will Ransom	42	F	6'8"	240	Jr	Fort Worth, TX	North Carolina Central
Mark Hall	5	G	6'3"	170	RS So	Round Lake Beach, IL	St. Cloud State
Reggie Lynch	22	C	6'10"	255	So	Edina, MN	Minnesota

=== Arrivals ===
==== Transfers ====
Name	Pos.	Height	Weight	Year	Hometown	Prior School
Quentin Brewer	F	6'8"	220	RS Sr	Tampa, FL	Bethune–Cookman

==== Recruiting class ====
College recruiting information
Name	Hometown	School	Height	Weight	Commit date
Keyshawn Evans; PG	Plantation, FL	The Sagemont School	5 ft 11 in (1.80 m)	150 lb (68 kg)	Sep 14, 2014
Keyshawn Evans; PG	Recruit ratings: Scout: Rivals: 247Sports: (NR)				
Roland Griffin; SG	Aurora, IL	Aurora West High School	6 ft 6 in (1.98 m)	195 lb (88 kg)	Jun 29, 2014
Roland Griffin; SG	Recruit ratings: Scout: Rivals: 247Sports: (NR)				
Elvis Harvey; PF	South Bay, FL	Oxford Academy	6 ft 8 in (2.03 m)	215 lb (98 kg)	Apr 28, 2015
Elvis Harvey; PF	Recruit ratings: Scout: Rivals: 247Sports: (NR)				
Matt Hein; PG	Orlando, FL	Windermere Preparatory School	6 ft 2 in (1.88 m)	170 lb (77 kg)	Aug 26, 2014
Matt Hein; PG	Recruit ratings: Scout: Rivals: 247Sports: (NR)				
Daouda Ndaiye; C	Orlando, FL	Windermere Preparatory School	6 ft 11 in (2.11 m)	205 lb (93 kg)	Aug 25, 2014
Daouda Ndaiye; C	Recruit ratings: Scout: Rivals: 247Sports: (NR)				
Overall recruit ranking:
Note: In many cases, Scout, Rivals, 247Sports, On3, and ESPN may conflict in their listings of height and weight.; In these cases, the average was taken. ESPN grades are on a 100-point scale.; Sources: "2015 Team Ranking". Rivals.

== Roster ==
2015–16 Illinois State Redbirds men's basketball team
Players
Coaches

Pos.	#	Name	Height	Weight	Year	Previous school	Hometown
F	0	Nick Banyard	6 ft 8 in (2.03 m)	225 lb (102 kg)	RS Jr	Edwards Marcus High School; New Mexico	Flower Mound, TX
G	1	Paris Lee	6 ft 0 in (1.83 m)	185 lb (84 kg)	Jr	Proviso East High School	Maywood, IL
F	2	Quintin Brewer	6 ft 8 in (2.03 m)	215 lb (98 kg)	RS Sr	Howard Blake High School; Bethune–Cookman	Atlanta, GA
G	3	Keyshawn Evans	6 ft 0 in (1.83 m)	170 lb (77 kg)	Fr	The Sagemont School	Plantation, FL
C	4	Daouda Ndaiye	6 ft 11 in (2.11 m)	210 lb (95 kg)	Fr	Windermere Preparatory School	Dakar, Senegal
G	5	Matt Hein (redshirt)	6 ft 3 in (1.91 m)	185 lb (84 kg)	Fr	Windermere Preparatory School	Windermere, FL
F	11	MiKyle McIntosh	6 ft 7 in (2.01 m)	234 lb (106 kg)	RS So	22 Feet Academy	Pickering, ON
G	12	Tony Wills	6 ft 3 in (1.91 m)	180 lb (82 kg)	Jr	Ben Davis High School	Indianapolis, IN
G	15	Justin McCloud	6 ft 4 in (1.93 m)	198 lb (90 kg)	Sr	Bottineau High School; Bismarck State College	Bottineau, ND
F	22	Elvis Harvey	6 ft 8 in (2.03 m)	210 lb (95 kg)	Fr	Oxbridge Academy	South Bay, FL
F	23	Deontae Hawkins	6 ft 8 in (2.03 m)	219 lb (99 kg)	RS So	Dunbar High School	Dayton, OH
G	31	Javaka Thompson (W) (redshirt)	6 ft 4 in (1.93 m)	191 lb (87 kg)	Jr	Whitney Young Magnet High School; Knox College	Chicago, IL
F	35	Roland Griffin	6 ft 7 in (2.01 m)	210 lb (95 kg)	Fr	West Aurora High School	Aurora, IL
G	44	DeVaughn Akoon-Purcell	6 ft 5 in (1.96 m)	185 lb (84 kg)	Sr	West Oaks Academy; Eastern Oklahoma State College	Orlando, FL

Head coach

- Dan Muller (Illinois State)

Assistant coach(es)

- Luke Yaklich (Illinois State)
- Dean Oliver (Iowa)
- Jeremy Ballard (Colgate)

Legend

- (C) Team captain
- (S) Suspended
- (I) Ineligible
- (W) Walk-on
- Injured
- Current redshirt

Roster
Last update: March 6, 2016

== Schedule and results ==
Date time, TV	Rank^{#}	Opponent^{#}	Result	Record	High points	High rebounds	High assists	Site (attendance) city, state
Exhibition Season
November 8, 2015*; 2:00 pm		Southern Indiana	W 88–81		25 – Akoon–Purcell	14 – Banyard	3 – Lee, Wills	Doug Collins Court at Redbird Arena (4,022); Normal, IL
Non-Conference Regular Season
November 13, 2015*; 9:00 pm, ESPN3		at San Diego State; Mountain West– Missouri Valley Challenge	L 60–71	0–1	13 – Griffin	7 – McCloud	7 – Lee	Viejas Arena (12,414); San Diego, CA
November 16, 2015*; 7:00 pm, ESPN3		Morehead State	W 67–66	1–1	23 – Akoon–Purcell	4 – Akoon–Purcell, Banyard, Griffin	7 – Lee	Doug Collins Court at Redbird Arena (4,698); Normal, IL
November 19, 2015*; 7:00 pm, ESPN3		South Dakota State; Cancún Challenge [Campus Site]	L 67–83	1–2	15 – Akoon–Purcell	7 – Hawkins	4 – McCloud	Doug Collins Court at Redbird Arena (4,107); Normal, IL
November 21, 2015*; 6:00 pm, ESPN3		Houston Baptist; Cancún Challenge [Campus Site]	W 72–56	2–2	20 – Akoon–Purcell	6 – Hawkins	5 – Lee	Doug Collins Court at Redbird Arena (4,100); Normal, IL
November 24, 2015*; 7:30 pm, CBSSN		vs. No. 2 Maryland; Cancún Challenge {Riviera Division} [Semifinal]	L 66–77	2–3	17 – McIntosh	6 – Hawkins	3 – Lee	Hard Rock Hotel; Riviera Maya (982); Cancún, Mexico
November 25, 2015*; 5:00 pm, CBSSN		vs. TCU; Cancún Challenge {Riviera Division} [Third Place]	L 60–71	2–4	16 – Lee	9 – McIntosh	2 – Akoon–Purcell	Hard Rock Hotel; Riviera Maya (982); Cancún, Mexico
November 27, 2015*; 2:00 pm, ESPN3		Quincy	W 73–63	3–4	18 – Akoon–Purcell	7 – Wills, Hawkins	5 – Akoon–Purcell, Lee	Doug Collins Court at Redbird Arena (3,853); Normal, IL
November 30, 2015*; 6:00 pm, ESPN2		at No. 1 Kentucky	L 63–75	3–5	22 – Akoon–Purcell	8 – Brewer	2 – Akoon–Purcell, McIntosh	Rupp Arena (21,894); Lexington, KY
December 5, 2015*; 7:00 pm, ESPN3		UAB	L 61–74	3–6	18 – Akoon–Purcell	8 – Akoon–Purcell	4 – Lee	Doug Collins Court at Redbird Arena (5,093); Normal, IL
December 13, 2015*; 3:00 pm, ESPN3		Murray State	W 63–61	4–6	16 – Hawkins	9 – Hawkins	7 – Lee	Doug Collins Court at Redbird Arena (4,239); Normal, IL
December 16, 2015*; 8:00 pm, CSNC+		at UIC	W 72–60	5–6	18 – Akoon–Purcell	11 – McIntosh	4 – Lee, McIntosh	UIC Pavilion (4,499); Chicago, IL
December 19, 2015*; 1:00 pm, A-10; Digital Network		at Saint Joseph's	L 65–79	5–7	16 – McIntosh	7 – Akoon–Purcell, McIntosh	4 – Lee	Hagan Arena (3,516); Philadelphia, PA
December 22, 2015*; 6:00 pm, ESPN3		Tennessee State	W 66–55	6–7	10 – Akoon–Purcell, Hawkins, Griffin	11 – Banyard	3 – Griffin	Doug Collins Court at Redbird Arena (4,205); Normal, IL
Missouri Valley Conference Regular Season
December 30, 2015; 7:00 pm, ESPN3		Missouri State	W 74–61	7–7 (1–0)	17 – Hawkins	7 – McIntosh	4 – McIntosh	Doug Collins Court at Redbird Arena (5,680); Normal, IL
January 3, 2016; 1:00 pm, ESPN3		at Drake	W 67–62	8–7 (2–0)	28 – Akoon–Purcell	9 – Akoon–Purcell	2 – Banyard, Lee	The Knapp Center (2,803); Des Moines, IA
January 6, 2016; 7:00 pm, ESPN3		Loyola–Chicago	W 54–52	9–7 (3–0)	14 – Akoon–Purcell	8 – Brewer	3 – McIntosh	Doug Collins Court at Redbird Arena (4,106); Normal, IL
January 9, 2016; 1:00 pm, CSNC/FSMW		at Indiana State	L 65–77	9–8 (3–1)	20 – McIntosh	6 – Brewer, Lee	5 – Lee	Hulman Center (3,801); Terre Haute, IN
January 12, 2016; 7:00 pm, ESPN3		at Southern Illinois	L 78–81	9–9 (3–2)	25 – McIntosh	9 – Hawkins	4 – Akoon–Purcell, Lee, Hawkins	SIU Arena (4,441); Carbondale, IL
January 15, 2016; 8:00 pm, ESPN2		Evansville	L 55–65	9–10 (3–3)	12 – Akoon–Purcell, Lee	10 – Hawkins	4 – Lee, Wills	Doug Collins Court at Redbird Arena (5,148); Normal, IL
January 20, 2016; 7:00 pm, ESPN3		at Bradley; I–74 Rivalry	W 55–52	10–10 (4–3)	16 – Lee	15 – Hawkins	4 – Lee, Wills	Carver Arena (7,300); Peoria, IL
January 23, 2016; 3:00 pm, CSNC/FSMW		Northern Iowa	W 76–67	11–10 (5–3)	18 – McIntosh	7 – Brewer	6 – Lee	Doug Collins Court at Redbird Arena (7,103); Normal, IL
January 26, 2016; 7:00 pm, CSNC+/FSMW		Drake	W 76–64	12–10 (6–3)	25 – McIntosh	7 – McIntosh	7 – Wills	Doug Collins Court at Redbird Arena (4,182); Normal, IL
January 30, 2016; 3:00 pm, ESPN3		at Missouri State	L 81–84 ^{OT}	12–11 (6–4)	18 – Akoon–Purcell	9 – Akoon–Purcell	6 – Lee	JQH Arena (3,546); Springfield, MO
February 3, 2016; 7:00 pm, ESPN3		at Loyola–Chicago	W 78–70	13–11 (7–4)	21 – McIntosh	6 – McIntosh	5 – Akoon–Purcell	Joseph J. Gentile Arena (1,691); Chicago, IL
February 6, 2016; 9:00 pm, ESPN2		No. 21 Wichita State	W 58–53	14–11 (8–4)	19 – Lee	10 – Hawkins	4 – Akoon–Purcell	Doug Collins Court at Redbird Arena (8,284); Normal, IL
February 11, 2016; 8:00 pm, CBSSN		at Evansville	W 70–60	15–11 (9–4)	18 – Banyard	9 – Hawkins	9 – Lee	Ford Center (4,195); Evansville, IN
February 14, 2016; 3:00 pm, ESPN3		Bradley; I–74 Rivalry	W 75–60	16–22 (10–4)	14 – McIntosh	6 – Hawkins, McIntosh	3 – Brewer, McIntosh	Doug Collins Court at Redbird Arena (7,888); Normal, IL
February 17, 2016; 7:00 pm, ESPN3		Indiana State	W 78–50	17–11 (11–4)	18 – Lee	8 – Brewer, Hawkins	5 – Wills	Doug Collins Court at Redbird Arena (4,456); Normal, IL
February 20, 2016; 3:00 pm, CBSSN		at Northern Iowa	L 66–75	17–12 (11–5)	14 – Lee	6 – Brewer, Lee	7 – Lee	McLeod Center (6,145); Cedar Falls, IA
February 24, 2016; 6:00 pm, CSNC+/FSMW		Southern Illinois	W 73–50	18–12 (12–5)	21 – Lee	7 – Akoon–Purcell, Banyard, Hawkins	4 – Lee	Doug Collins Court at Redbird Arena (6,052); Normal, IL
February 27, 2016; 1:00 pm, ESPN2		at Wichita State	L 58–74	18–13 (12–6)	15 – Akoon–Purcell	7 – Hawkins	4 – Akoon–Purcell	Charles Koch Arena (10,506); Wichita, KS
State Farm Missouri Valley Conference {MVC} tournament
March 3, 2016*; 8:30 pm, CSNC/FSMW	(3)	vs. (6) Indiana State; Quarterfinal	L 57–65	18–14	17 – McIntosh	14 – Akoon–Purcell	2 – Lee, Wills	Scottrade Center (8,468); St. Louis, MO
*Non-conference game. ^{#}Rankings from AP Poll. (#) Tournament seedings in parentheses. All times are in Central Standard Time.
