= 2015–16 Indiana State Sycamores men's basketball team =

American college basketball season

2015–16 Indiana State Sycamores men's basketball
- Conference: Missouri Valley Conference
- Record: 15–17 (8–10 MVC)
- Head coach: Greg Lansing (6th season)
- Assistant coaches: Lou Gudino; Marcus Belcher; Terry Parker
- Home arena: Hulman Center

2015–16 Missouri Valley Conference men's basketball standings
	Conf.				Overall
Team	W		L	PCT	W		L	PCT
Wichita State	16	–	2	.889	26	–	9	.743
Evansville	12	–	6	.667	25	–	9	.735
Illinois State	12	–	6	.667	18	–	14	.563
Southern Illinois	11	–	7	.611	22	–	10	.688
Northern Iowa †	11	–	7	.611	23	–	13	.639
Indiana State	8	–	10	.444	15	–	17	.469
Missouri State	8	–	10	.444	13	–	19	.406
Loyola Chicago	7	–	11	.389	15	–	17	.469
Bradley	3	–	15	.167	5	–	27	.156
Drake	2	–	16	.111	7	–	24	.226
† 2016 MVC tournament winner

The 2015–16 Indiana State Sycamores basketball team represented Indiana State University during the 2015–16 NCAA Division I men's basketball season. The Sycamores, led by sixth year head coach Greg Lansing, played their home games at the Hulman Center and were members of the Missouri Valley Conference. They finished the season 15–17, 8–10 in Missouri Valley play to finish in a tie for sixth place. They defeated Illinois State in the quarterfinals of the Missouri Valley tournament to advance to the semifinals where they lost to Evansville.

== Previous season ==
The Sycamores finished the season 15–16, 11–7 in MVC play to finish in a tie for third place. They lost in the quarterfinals of the Missouri Valley tournament to Loyola–Chicago.

== Departures ==
Name	Number	Pos.	Height	Weight	Year	Hometown	Notes
Jake Kitchell	0	F/C	6'10"	233	Senior	Union Mills, IN	Graduated
Alex Etherington	2	G/F	6'5"	210	Sophomore	Cicero, IN	Transferred to Indianapolis
Justin Gant	5	F	6'9"	240	Senior	Terre Haute, IN	Graduated
Tre' Bennett	15	G	5'10"	183	Junior	Houston, TX	Transferred to Angelo State

=== Incoming transfers ===
Name	Number	Pos.	Height	Weight	Year	Hometown	Previous School
Everett Clemons	0	G	6'0"	185	Junior	Springfield, IL	Junior college transfer from Vincennes University.

== Recruiting ==
College recruiting information
Name	Hometown	School	Height	Weight	Commit date
Bronson Kessinger; SF	Corydon, IN	Corydon Central High School	6 ft 6 in (1.98 m)	200 lb (91 kg)	Sep 8, 2014
Bronson Kessinger; SF	Recruit ratings: Scout: Rivals: (NR)				
Emondre Rickman; PF	Collinsville, IL	Collinsville High School	6 ft 8 in (2.03 m)	220 lb (100 kg)	Sep 13, 2014
Emondre Rickman; PF	Recruit ratings: Scout: Rivals: (NR)				
Overall recruit ranking:
Note: In many cases, Scout, Rivals, 247Sports, On3, and ESPN may conflict in their listings of height and weight.; In these cases, the average was taken. ESPN grades are on a 100-point scale.; Sources: "2015 Team Ranking". Rivals.

== Roster ==
2015–16 Indiana State Sycamores men's basketball team
Players
Coaches

Pos.	#	Name	Height	Weight	Year	Previous school	Hometown
G	0	Everett Clemons	6 ft 1 in (1.85 m)	180 lb (82 kg)	Jr	Vincennes; Lanphier HS	Springfield, IL
G/F	1	Kristian Smith	6 ft 6 in (1.98 m)	200 lb (91 kg)	Sr	Pike HS	Indianapolis, IN
G	4	Brenton Scott	6 ft 1 in (1.85 m)	192 lb (87 kg)	RS So	Northrop HS	Fort Wayne, IN
F	5	Bronson Kessinger	6 ft 8 in (2.03 m)	205 lb (93 kg)	Fr	Corydon Central HS	Corydon, IN
G	10	Kalen Alexander (W)	6 ft 3 in (1.91 m)	169 lb (77 kg)	Jr	Terre Haute North Vigo HS	Terre Haute, IN
G	11	Devonte Brown	6 ft 2 in (1.88 m)	195 lb (88 kg)	Sr	Ellison HS	Killeen, TX
F	12	Niels Bunschoten	6 ft 9 in (2.06 m)	220 lb (100 kg)	Jr	Howard College	Bussum, Netherlands
G	20	Grant Prusator	6 ft 0 in (1.83 m)	171 lb (78 kg)	Jr	Highland CC; Rochelle Township HS	Rochelle, IL
G	22	Brandon Burnett	6 ft 6 in (1.98 m)	232 lb (105 kg)	Sr	Cienega HS	Tucson, AZ
G/F	24	Nick Amor (W)	6 ft 4 in (1.93 m)	187 lb (85 kg)	Jr	LaVille HS	Lakeville, IN
F	30	Matt Van Scyoc	6 ft 6 in (1.98 m)	218 lb (99 kg)	RS Jr	The Citadel; Green Lake HS	Green Lake, WI
G	32	Laquarious Paige	6 ft 3 in (1.91 m)	174 lb (79 kg)	RS Fr	Stark HS	West Orange, TX
F/C	34	Brandon Murphy	6 ft 7 in (2.01 m)	290 lb (132 kg)	So	Carver HS	Montgomery, AL
F/C	41	Emondre Rickman	6 ft 9 in (2.06 m)	220 lb (100 kg)	Fr	Collinsville HS	Collinsville, IL
C	42	T. J. Bell	6 ft 8 in (2.03 m)	254 lb (115 kg)	Jr	Charleston HS	Charleston, IL

Head coach

- Greg Lansing (South Dakota)

Assistant coach(es)

- Lou Gudino (Indiana)
- Marcus Belcher (Southern Illinois)
- Terry Parker (Louisiana Tech)

Legend

- (C) Team captain
- (S) Suspended
- (I) Ineligible
- (W) Walk-on
- Injured
- Current redshirt

Roster

== Schedule ==
Date time, TV	Opponent	Result	Record	Site (attendance) city, state
Exhibition
11/07/2015*; 2:00 pm	DePauw	W 91–71		Hulman Center (3,431); Terre Haute, IN
Non-conference regular season
11/13/2015*; 7:00 pm, ESPN3	IUPUI	L 70–72	0–1	Hulman Center (4,131); Terre Haute, IN
11/16/2015*; 7:00 pm, ESPN3	Wyoming; MW–MWC Challenge	W 70–55	1–1	Hulman Center (3,601); Terre Haute, IN
11/20/2015*; 8:30 pm	vs. Norfolk State; Paradise Jam quarterfinals	W 70-61	2–1	Sports and Fitness Center; St. Thomas, VI
11/22/2015*; 6:30 pm, CBSSN	vs. Tulsa; Paradise Jam semifinals	L 59–67	2–2	Sports and Fitness Center; St. Thomas, VI
11/23/2015*; 6:30 pm, CBSSN	vs. Hofstra; Paradise Jam 3rd place game	W 67–66	3–2	Sports and Fitness Center (2,002); St. Thomas, VI
12/01/2015*; 8:00 pm	at Eastern Illinois	L 62–68	3–3	Lantz Arena (1,183); Charleston, IL
12/05/2015*; 12:00 pm, FS1	at Butler	L 71–85	3–4	Hinkle Fieldhouse (8,142); Indianapolis, IN
12/09/2015*; 7:00 pm, ESPN3	Valparaiso	L 63–69	3–5	Hulman Center (3,621); Terre Haute, IN
12/13/2015*; 1:00 pm, FCS	at WKU	L 62–75	3–6	E. A. Diddle Arena (2,810); Bowling Green, KY
12/16/2015*; 7:00 pm, ESPN3	Illinois–Springfield	W 75–60	4–6	Hulman Center (3,110); Terre Haute, IN
12/19/2015*; 8:00 pm, FSMW	at Saint Louis	W 76–68	5–6	Chaifetz Arena (7,244); St. Louis, MO
12/22/2015*; 7:00 pm, ESPN3	Ball State	W 73–61	6–6	Hulman Center (3,256); Terre Haute, IN
Missouri Valley Conference regular season
12/30/2015; 8:00 pm, ESPN3	at Evansville	L 62–70	6–7 (0–1)	Ford Center (7,801); Evansville, IN
01/02/2016; 2:00 pm, ESPN3	Loyola–Chicago	W 73–58	7–7 (1–1)	Hulman Center (3,375); Terre Haute, IN
01/06/2016; 7:00 pm, ESPN3	at Drake	W 79–69	8–7 (2–1)	Knapp Center; Des Moines, IA
01/09/2016; 2:00 pm, MVC TV/FSIND	Illinois State	W 77–65	9–7 (3–1)	Hulman Center (3,801); Terre Haute, IN
01/13/2016; 7:00 pm, ESPN3	Northern Iowa	W 74–60	10–7 (4–1)	Hulman Center (3,544); Terre Haute, IN
01/17/2016; 4:00 pm, ESPN3	at Wichita State	L 62–82	10–8 (4–2)	Charles Koch Arena (10,506); Wichita, KS
01/20/2016; 8:00 pm, ESPN3	at Southern Illinois	L 66–79	10–9 (4–3)	SIU Arena (5,036); Carbondale, IL
01/24/2016; 4:00 pm, ESPNU	Evansville	W 82–65	11–9 (5–3)	Hulman Center (4,630); Terre Haute, IN
01/27/2016; 7:00 pm, ESPN3	Missouri State	W 68–59	12–9 (6–3)	Hulman Center (3,501); Terre Haute, IN
01/30/2016; 4:00 pm, MVC TV/FSIND	at Loyola–Chicago	L 96–104 ^{2OT}	12–10 (6–4)	Joseph J. Gentile Arena; Chicago, IL
02/02/2016; 7:00 pm, ESPN3	Drake	W 63–56	13–10 (7–4)	Hulman Center (3,409); Terre Haute, IN
02/06/2016; 8:00 pm, ESPN3	at Bradley	L 58–63	13–11 (7–5)	Carver Arena (6,028); Peoria, IL
02/10/2016; 7:00 pm, ESPN3	Southern Illinois	L 78–85	13–12 (7–6)	Hulman Center (3,221); Terre Haute, IN
02/13/2016; 3:00 pm, ESPN3	at Missouri State	L 85–89 ^{OT}	13–13 (7–7)	JQH Arena (4,400); Springfield, MO
02/17/2016; 8:00 pm, ESPN3	at Illinois State	L 50–78	13–14 (7–8)	Redbird Arena (4,456); Normal, IL
02/21/2016; 4:00 pm, ESPNU	Wichita State	L 51–84	13–15 (7–9)	Hulman Center (10,200); Terre Haute, IN
02/24/2016; 8:00 pm, ESPN3	at Northern Iowa	L 44-66	13-16 (7-10)	McLeod Center (5,911); Cedar Falls, IA
02/27/2016; 8:00 pm, ESPN3	Bradley	W 77–58	14–16 (8–10)	Hulman Center (3,700); Terre Haute, IN
Missouri Valley tournament
03/04/2016; 8:30 pm, ESPN3	vs. Illinois State; Quarterfinals	W 65–57	15–16	Scottrade Center (8,468); St. Louis, MO
03/05/2016; 6:00 pm, CBSSN	vs. Evansville; Semifinals	L 42–68	15–17	Scottrade Center (14,299); St. Louis, MO
*Non-conference game. ^{#}Rankings from AP Poll. (#) Tournament seedings in parentheses. All times are in Eastern Time.
