= 2015–16 Bradley Braves men's basketball team =

American college basketball season

2015–16 Bradley Braves men's basketball
- Conference: Missouri Valley Conference
- Record: 5–27 (3–15 MVC)
- Head coach: Brian Wardle (1st season)
- Assistant coaches: Drew Adams; Mike Bargen; Jimmie Foster
- Home arena: Carver Arena

2015–16 Missouri Valley Conference men's basketball standings
	Conf.				Overall
Team	W		L	PCT	W		L	PCT
Wichita State	16	–	2	.889	26	–	9	.743
Evansville	12	–	6	.667	25	–	9	.735
Illinois State	12	–	6	.667	18	–	14	.563
Southern Illinois	11	–	7	.611	22	–	10	.688
Northern Iowa †	11	–	7	.611	23	–	13	.639
Indiana State	8	–	10	.444	15	–	17	.469
Missouri State	8	–	10	.444	13	–	19	.406
Loyola Chicago	7	–	11	.389	15	–	17	.469
Bradley	3	–	15	.167	5	–	27	.156
Drake	2	–	16	.111	7	–	24	.226
† 2016 MVC tournament winner

The 2015–16 Bradley Braves men's basketball team represented Bradley University during the 2015–16 NCAA Division I men's basketball season. The Braves were led by first year head coach Brian Wardle, who was hired in the offseason to replace Geno Ford. The Braves were members of the Missouri Valley Conference and played their home games at Carver Arena in Peoria, Illinois. They finished the season 5–27, 3–15 in Missouri Valley play to finish in ninth place. They lost in the first round of the Missouri Valley tournament to Loyola–Chicago.

== Previous season ==
The Braves finished the 2014–15 season with an overall record of 9–24. The team finished in last place in the Missouri Valley Conference with a conference record of 3–15. Following a first round upset of No. 7 seed Drake in the MVC tournament, the Braves season ended with a loss to Northern Iowa.

On March 22, 2015, Bradley fired head men's basketball coach Geno Ford, who compiled a 46–86 (19–53) record in four seasons at Bradley. Ford was replaced less than a week later by UW–Green Bay head coach Brian Wardle.

== Departures ==
Name	Number	Pos.	Height	Weight	Year	Hometown	Notes
Warren Jones	2	G	6'3"	190	Junior	Centralia, IL	Graduate transferred to Wisconsin–Parkside
Auston Barnes	4	F	6'8"	215	Senior	Lansing, MI	Graduated
Tramique Sutherland	5	G	5'11"	175	Junior	Toronto, ON	Transferred to UT Permian Basin
Darrion Harris	12	G	5'10"	155	Junior	St. Louis, MO	Left the team for personal reasons
Kendahl Amerson	13	G	6'3"	180	Junior	Detroit, MI	Transferred to Central Oklahoma
Josh Cunningham	21	F	6'7"	180	Freshman	Chicago, IL	Transferred to Dayton
Xazavier Taylor	22	F/C	6'9"	225	Sophomore	Chicago, IL	Transferred to IPFW
Omari Grier	24	G	6'4"	180	RS Junior	Erial, NJ	Graduate transfer to Rutgers
Nate Wells	52	C	7'1"	260	Junior	Davenport, IA	Graduate transfer to Ball State

=== Incoming transfers ===
Name	Number	Pos.	Height	Weight	Year	Hometown	Previous School
Alex Foster	34	F	6'8"	225	Junior	Joliet, IL	Transferred from Texas Tech. Under NCAA transfer rules, Foster will have to sit out for the 2015–16 season. Will have two years of remaining eligibility.

== 2015 recruiting class ==
College recruiting information
Name	Hometown	School	Height	Weight	Commit date
Joel Okafor; PG	Richmond, IN	Richmond High School	5 ft 11 in (1.80 m)	175 lb (79 kg)	Apr 20, 2015
Joel Okafor; PG	Recruit ratings: Scout: Rivals: (77)				
Ronnie Suggs; SG	Washington, MO	Vermont Academy	6 ft 4 in (1.93 m)	170 lb (77 kg)	Apr 19, 2015
Ronnie Suggs; SG	Recruit ratings: Scout: Rivals: (POST)				
Dwayne Lautier-Ogunleye; SG	Briston, England	Stroud College	6 ft 3 in (1.91 m)	190 lb (86 kg)	N/A
Dwayne Lautier-Ogunleye; SG	Recruit ratings: Scout: Rivals: (NR)				
Scottie James; SG	Tarpon Springs, FL	Tarpon Springs High School	6 ft 7 in (2.01 m)	N/A	May 17, 2015
Scottie James; SG	Recruit ratings: Scout: Rivals: (NR)				
Overall recruit ranking: Scout: – Rivals: –
Note: In many cases, Scout, Rivals, 247Sports, On3, and ESPN may conflict in their listings of height and weight.; In these cases, the average was taken. ESPN grades are on a 100-point scale.; Sources: "Bradley Commit List for 2015". Rivals.; "Men's Basketball Recruiting". Scout.; "ESPN – Bradley Braves Basketball Recruiting 2015". ESPN.; "Scout.com Team Recruiting Rankings". Scout.; "2015 Team Ranking". Rivals.

== Roster ==
2015–16 Bradley Braves men's basketball team
Players
Coaches

Pos.	#	Name	Height	Weight	Year	Previous school	Hometown
G	0	Ka'Darryl Bell	6 ft 1 in (1.85 m)	200 lb (91 kg)	Sr	Oak Park-River Forest HS	Chicago, IL
F	1	Donte Thomas	6 ft 7 in (2.01 m)	217 lb (98 kg)	So	Thornwood HS	Calumet City, IL
G	3	Anthony Fields	6 ft 0 in (1.83 m)	160 lb (73 kg)	RS Sr	Quality Education Academy; Wake Forest	Detroit, MI
G	4	Joel Okafor	5 ft 11 in (1.8 m)	175 lb (79 kg)	Fr	Richmond HS	Richmond, IN
C	5	Davante Cooper	6 ft 10 in (2.08 m)	215 lb (98 kg)	Fr	West Oaks Academy	Atlanta, GA
G	10	Jackson Kane (W)	5 ft 10 in (1.78 m)	175 lb (79 kg)	Sr	Monmouth-Roseville HS; Southeastern CC	Roseville, IL
F	13	Luuk van Bree	6 ft 8 in (2.03 m)	210 lb (95 kg)	Fr	Canarias Basketball Academy	Venray, Netherlands
F	14	Peter Hanley (W)	6 ft 6 in (1.98 m)	200 lb (91 kg)	Fr	Notre Dame HS	Peoria, IL
G	22	Ronnie Suggs	6 ft 6 in (1.98 m)	185 lb (84 kg)	Fr	Vermont Academy	Washington, MO
G	23	Dwayne Lautier-Ogunleye	6 ft 3 in (1.91 m)	195 lb (88 kg)	Fr	Bristol Academy Flyers	London, England
F	24	Scottie James	6 ft 8 in (2.03 m)	215 lb (98 kg)	Fr	Tarpon Springs HS	Tarpon Springs, FL
F	30	Callum Barker	6 ft 9 in (2.06 m)	240 lb (109 kg)	Fr	Notre Dame Prep	Hobart, Australia
F	32	Mike Shaw	6 ft 8 in (2.03 m)	230 lb (104 kg)	RS Sr	De La Salle Institute; Illinois	Chicago, IL
F	34	Alex Foster (I) (redshirt)	6 ft 8 in (2.03 m)	225 lb (102 kg)	Jr	Seton Academy; Texas Tech	Joliet, IL

Head coach

- Brian Wardle (Marquette)

Assistant coach(es)

- Drew Adams (Tennessee)
- Mike Bargen (Marquette)
- Jimmie Foster (South Dakota)

Legend

- (C) Team captain
- (S) Suspended
- (I) Ineligible
- (W) Walk-on
- Injured
- Current redshirt

Roster

== Schedule and results ==
Date time, TV	Opponent	Result	Record	Site (attendance) city, state
Exhibition
11/04/2015*; 7:00 pm	Edgewood College	W 78–42		Carver Arena (5,829); Peoria, IL
11/09/2015*; 7:00 pm	Saint Joseph's (IN)	W 84–65		Carver Arena (4,957); Peoria, IL
Non-conference regular season
11/13/2015*; 7:00 pm, ESPN3	Ball State	W 54–53	1–0	Carver Arena; Peoria, IL
11/16/2015*; 7:00 pm, P12N	at No. 12 Arizona	L 60–90	1–1	McKale Center (14,238); Tucson, AZ
11/19/2015*; 8:30 pm, ESPN2	vs. No. 6 Virginia; Charleston Classic quarterfinals	L 57–82	1–2	TD Arena (2,517); Charleston, SC
11/20/2015*; 6:00 pm, ESPNU	vs. Seton Hall; Charleston Classic consolation round	L 59–67	1–3	TD Arena (2,820); Charleston, SC
11/22/2015*; 12:30 pm, ESPN3	vs. Towson; Charleston Classic 7th place game	L 60–62	1–4	TD Arena (1,553); Charleston, SC
11/25/2015*; 7:00 pm, ESPN3	New Orleans	L 51–64	1–5	Carver Arena (5,379); Peoria, IL
11/28/2015*; 1:00 pm, ESPN3	Ole Miss; Charleston Classic	L 54–67	1–6	Carver Arena (5,603); Peoria, IL
12/01/2015*; 6:00 pm	at Delaware	L 47–70	1–7	Bob Carpenter Center (1,361); Newark, DE
12/05/2015*; 7:00 pm, ESPN3	North Dakota	L 59–65 ^{2OT}	1–8	Carver Arena (5,557); Peoria, IL
12/08/2015*; 7:00 pm	at Texas–Arlington	L 61–97	1–9	College Park Center (1,833); Arlington, TX
12/17/2015*; 7:00 pm	Maryville	W 61–53	2–9	Carver Arena (5,601); Peoria, IL
12/20/2015*; 1:00 pm, ROOT	at Boise State; MW–MVC Challenge	L 70–90	2–10	Taco Bell Arena (4,405); Boise, ID
12/23/2015*; 7:00 pm, ESPN3	TCU	L 49–53	2–11	Carver Arena (5,560); Peoria, IL
Missouri Valley Conference regular season
12/30/2015; 7:00 pm, ESPN3	at Northern Iowa	L 44–80	2–12 (0–1)	McLeod Center (5,230); Cedar Falls, IA
01/03/2016; 1:00 pm, ESPN3	Wichita State	L 58–85	2–13 (0–2)	Carver Arena (6,597); Peoria, IL
01/06/2016; 7:00 pm, ESPN3	Southern Illinois	L 44–65	2–14 (0–3)	Carver Arena (5,639); Peoria, IL
01/09/2016; 3:00 pm, ESPN3	at Evansville	L 35–67	2–15 (0–4)	Ford Center (5,873); Evansville, IN
01/13/2016; 6:00 pm, ESPN3	at Loyola–Chicago	W 54–53	3–15 (1–4)	Joseph J. Gentile Arena (1,386); Chicago, IL
01/16/2016; 8:00 pm, ESPN3	Missouri State	L 42–61	3–16 (1–5)	Carver Arena (6,076); Peoria, IL
01/20/2016; 7:00 pm, ESPN3	Illinois State	L 52–55	3–17 (1–6)	Carver Arena (7,300); Peoria, IL
01/23/2016; 2:00 pm, ESPN3	at Wichita State	L 54–88	3–18 (1–7)	Charles Koch Arena (10,506); Wichita, KS
01/27/2016; 8:00 pm, ESPN3	Northern Iowa	L 50–68	3–19 (1–8)	Carver Arena (5,334); Peoria, IL
01/30/2016; 2:00 pm, ESPN3	at Drake	L 70–80	3–20 (1–9)	Knapp Center (3,524); Des Moines, IA
02/02/2016; 7:00 pm, ESPN3	at Missouri State	L 71–77	3–21 (1–10)	JQH Arena (3,723); Springfield, MO
02/06/2016; 7:00 pm, ESPN3	Indiana State	W 63–58	4–21 (2–10)	Carver Arena (6,028); Peoria, IL
02/10/2016; 7:00 pm, ESPN3	Loyola–Chicago	L 43–54	4–22 (2–11)	Carver Arena (5,400); Peoria, IL
02/14/2016; 3:00 pm, ESPN3	at Illinois State	L 60–75	4–23 (2–12)	Redbird Arena (7,888); Normal, IL
02/17/2016; 7:00 pm, ESPN3	at Southern Illinois	L 59–71	4–24 (2–13)	SIU Arena (5,002); Carbondale, IL
02/20/2016; 7:00 pm, ESPN3	Drake	W 73–70	5–24 (3–13)	Carver Arena (7,149); Peoria, IL
02/23/2016; 8:00 pm, ESPN3	Evansville	L 55–67	5–25 (3–14)	Carver Arena (5,523); Peoria, IL
02/27/2016; 1:00 pm, ESPN3	at Indiana State	L 58–77	5–26 (3–15)	Hulman Center (3,700); Terre Haute, IN
Missouri Valley tournament
03/03/2016; 6:00 pm, ESPN3	vs. Loyola–Chicago; First round	L 66–74	5–27	Scottrade Center (6,929); St. Louis, MO
*Non-conference game. ^{#}Rankings from AP Poll. (#) Tournament seedings in parentheses. All times are in Central Time.
