= 2015–16 Loyola Ramblers men's basketball team =

American college basketball season

2015–16 Loyola Ramblers men's basketball
- Conference: Missouri Valley Conference
- Record: 15–17 (7–11 MVC)
- Head coach: Porter Moser (5th season)
- Assistant coaches: Bennie Seltzer; Emanuel Dildy; Matt Gordon
- Home arena: Joseph J. Gentile Arena

2015–16 Missouri Valley Conference men's basketball standings
	Conf.				Overall
Team	W		L	PCT	W		L	PCT
Wichita State	16	–	2	.889	26	–	9	.743
Evansville	12	–	6	.667	25	–	9	.735
Illinois State	12	–	6	.667	18	–	14	.563
Southern Illinois	11	–	7	.611	22	–	10	.688
Northern Iowa †	11	–	7	.611	23	–	13	.639
Indiana State	8	–	10	.444	15	–	17	.469
Missouri State	8	–	10	.444	13	–	19	.406
Loyola Chicago	7	–	11	.389	15	–	17	.469
Bradley	3	–	15	.167	5	–	27	.156
Drake	2	–	16	.111	7	–	24	.226
† 2016 MVC tournament winner

The 2015–16 Loyola Ramblers men's basketball team represented Loyola University Chicago during the 2015–16 NCAA Division I men's basketball season. The Ramblers, led by fifth year head coach Porter Moser, played their home games at the Joseph J. Gentile Arena and were members of the Missouri Valley Conference. They finished the season 15–17, 7–11 in Missouri Valley play to finish in eighth place. They defeated Bradley in the first round of the Missouri Valley tournament to advance to the quarterfinals where they lost to Wichita State.

== Previous season ==
The Ramblers finished the season 24–13, 8–10 in MVC play to finish in sixth place. They advanced to the semifinals of the Missouri Valley tournament where they lost to Northern Iowa. They were invited to the College Basketball Invitational where they defeated Rider, Oral Roberts, and Seattle to advance to the best-of-three finals series against Louisiana–Monroe. They defeated Louisiana–Monroe 2 games to 0 to become the CBI champions.

== Departures ==
Name	Number	Pos.	Height	Weight	Year	Hometown	Notes
Joe Crisman	5	G	6'4"	200	Senior	Munster, IN	Graduated
London Dokubo	13	G	6'0"	170	Senior	Schaumburg, IL	Graduated
Eric Porter	22	G	5'11"	165	Freshman	Deerfield, IL	Walk on; didn't return
Christian Thomas	32	G/F	6'5"	220	Senior	St. Louis, MO	Graduated

=== Incoming transfers ===
Name	Number	Pos.	Height	Weight	Year	Hometown	Previous School
Clayton Custer	13	G	6'0"	175	Sophomore	Overland Park, KS	Transferred from Iowa State. Under NCAA transfer rules, Custer will have to sit out for the 2015–16 season. Will have three years of remaining eligibility.
Tyson Smith	25	G	6'2"	185	Sophomore	Baltimore, MD	Junior college transferred from College of Southern Idaho
Maurice Kirby	31	C	6'9"	230	Sophomore	Phoenix, AZ	Junior college transferred from Coffeyville Community College.

== Recruiting ==
College recruiting information
Name	Hometown	School	Height	Weight	Commit date
Roosevelt Smart; PG	Palatine, IL	Sunrise Christian Academy	6 ft 2 in (1.88 m)	170 lb (77 kg)	Sep 24, 2014
Roosevelt Smart; PG	Recruit ratings: Scout: Rivals: (79)				
Pernell Adgei; SF	Dumfries, VA	Fishburne Military School	6 ft 7 in (2.01 m)	N/A	Oct 23, 2014
Pernell Adgei; SF	Recruit ratings: Scout: Rivals: (N/A)				
Overall recruit ranking: Scout: – Rivals: –
Note: In many cases, Scout, Rivals, 247Sports, On3, and ESPN may conflict in their listings of height and weight.; In these cases, the average was taken. ESPN grades are on a 100-point scale.; Sources: "2015 Team Ranking". Rivals.

== Roster ==
2015–16 Loyola Ramblers men's basketball team
Players
Coaches

Pos.	#	Name	Height	Weight	Year	Previous school	Hometown
G/F	0	Donte Ingram	6 ft 6 in (1.98 m)	215 lb (98 kg)	So	Simeon	Chicago, IL
G	2	Earl Peterson	6 ft 3 in (1.91 m)	180 lb (82 kg)	Sr	Rayton South; Coffeyville CC	Raytown, MO
G	4	Devon Turk	6 ft 4 in (1.93 m)	195 lb (88 kg)	Sr	Westbury Christian	Houston, TX
G/F	5	Pernell Adgei	6 ft 7 in (2.01 m)	215 lb (98 kg)	Fr	Pope John Paul The Great	Dumfries, VA
F	10	Jay Knuth	6 ft 6 in (1.98 m)	205 lb (93 kg)	So	Johnston	Johnston, IA
F	12	Julius Rajala	6 ft 9 in (2.06 m)	215 lb (98 kg)	So	n/a	Helsinki, Finland
G	13	Clayton Custer (I) (redshirt)	6 ft 1 in (1.85 m)	185 lb (84 kg)	So	Blue Valley Northwest; Iowa State	Overland Park, KS
G	14	Ben Richardson	6 ft 3 in (1.91 m)	185 lb (84 kg)	So	Blue Valley Northwest	Overland Park, KS
G	23	Jeff White	6 ft 1 in (1.85 m)	185 lb (84 kg)	Sr	Manual	Peoria, IL
F	24	Montel James	6 ft 7 in (2.01 m)	220 lb (100 kg)	Sr	Bonnabel; Coffeyville CC	Kenner, LA
G	25	Tyson Smith	6 ft 2 in (1.88 m)	185 lb (84 kg)	So	Westwind Prep; Southern Idaho	Baltimore, MD
F	31	Maurice Kirby	6 ft 9 in (2.06 m)	240 lb (109 kg)	So	Basha; Coffeyville CC	Chandler, AZ
F	34	Cal Kennedy (W)	6 ft 6 in (1.98 m)	210 lb (95 kg)	RS So	Brother Rice	Oak Lawn, IL
G	35	Milton Doyle	6 ft 4 in (1.93 m)	185 lb (84 kg)	Jr	Marshall; Kansas	Chicago, IL

Head coach

- Porter Moser (Creighton)

Assistant coach(es)

- Bennie Seltzer (Washington State)
- Emanuel Dildy (Eastern Illinois)
- Bryan Mullins (Southern Illinois)

Legend

- (C) Team captain
- (S) Suspended
- (I) Ineligible
- (W) Walk-on
- Injured
- Current redshirt

Roster

== Schedule ==
Date time, TV	Opponent	Result	Record	Site (attendance) city, state
Exhibition
11/06/2015*; 7:00 pm	Lewis	W 75–65		Joseph J. Gentile Arena; Chicago, IL
Non-conference regular season
11/13/2015*; 7:00 pm, ESPN3	UTSA	W 76–64	1–0	Joseph J. Gentile Arena (1,711); Chicago, IL
11/14/2015*; 7:00 pm, ESPN3	Eureka	W 84–51	2–0	Joseph J. Gentile Arena (1,217); Chicago, IL
11/18/2015*; 8:00 pm, ROOT	at New Mexico; MW–MWC Challenge	L 51–75	2–1	The Pit (11,951); Albuquerque, NM
11/21/2015*; 4:00 pm, ESPN3	Toledo; Great Alaska Shootout	W 69–62	3–1	Joseph J. Gentile Arena (1,556); Chicago, IL
11/26/2015*; 1:00 am, CBSSN	vs. San Diego; Great Alaska Shootout quarterfinals	W 67–57	4–1	Alaska Airlines Center (2,362); Anchorage, AK
11/27/2015*; 9:00 pm, CBSSN	vs. Toledo; Great Alaska Shootout semifinals	L 74–82	4–2	Alaska Airlines Center (2,757); Anchorage, AK
11/28/2015*; 8:30 pm	vs. UNC Asheville; Great Alaska Shootout 3rd place game	L 48–59	4–3	Alaska Airlines Center (2,906); Anchorage, AK
12/05/2015*; 1:00 pm, CSN Chicago	Creighton	W 68–65	5–3	Joseph J. Gentile Arena (3,473); Chicago, IL
12/13/2015*; 1:00 pm	at Notre Dame	L 61–81	5–4	Edmund P. Joyce Center (8,653); South Bend, IN
12/16/2015*; 7:00 pm, ESPN3	Cleveland State	L 54–60	5–5	Joseph J. Gentile Arena (1,189); Chicago, IL
12/19/2015*; 3:00 pm, ESPN3	UIC	W 64–47	6–5	Joseph J. Gentile Arena (1,562); Chicago, IL
12/21/2015*; 7:00 pm, ESPN3	Western Illinois	W 72–67	7–5	Joseph J. Gentile Arena (1,211); Chicago, IL
Missouri Valley regular season
12/30/2015; 7:00 pm, CSN Chicago	Southern Illinois	L 62–72	7–6 (0–1)	Joseph J. Gentile Arena (1,624); Chicago, IL
01/02/2016; 1:00 pm, ESPN3	at Indiana State	L 58–73	7–7 (0–2)	Hulman Center (3,375); Terre Haute, IN
01/06/2016; 7:00 pm, ESPN3	at Illinois State	L 52–54	7–8 (0–3)	Redbird Arena (4,106); Normal, IL
01/09/2016; 3:00 pm, ESPN3	Missouri State	L 54–56	7–9 (0–4)	Joseph J. Gentile Arena (1,128); Chicago, IL
01/13/2016; 6:00 pm, CSN Chicago	Bradley	L 53–54	7–10 (0–5)	Joseph J. Gentile Arena (1,386); Chicago, IL
01/16/2016; 3:00 pm, CSN Chicago	at Northern Iowa	W 51–41	8–10 (1–5)	McLeod Center (6,033); Cedar Falls, IA
01/19/2016; 8:00 pm, CBSSN	at Evansville	L 66–74	8–11 (1–6)	Ford Center (4,014); Evansville, IN
01/23/2016; 1:00 pm, CSN Chicago	Drake	W 68–63	9–11 (2–6)	Joseph J. Gentile Arena (2,925); Chicago, IL
01/27/2016; 8:00 pm, CBSSN	at No. 22 Wichita State	L 54–80	15–5 (9–0)	Charles Koch Arena (10,506); Wichita, KS
01/30/2016; 3:00 pm, CSN Chicago	Indiana State	W 104–96 ^{OT}	10–12 (3–7)	Joseph J. Gentile Arena; Chicago, IL
02/03/2016; 7:00 pm, ESPN3	Illinois State	L 70–73	10–13 (3–8)	Joseph J. Gentile Arena (1,691); Chicago, IL
02/06/2016; 7:00 pm, ESPN3	at Southern Illinois	W 73–59	11–13 (4–8)	SIU Arena (5,788); Carbondale, IL
02/10/2016; 7:00 pm, ESPN3	at Bradley	W 54–43	12–13 (5–8)	Carver Arena (5,400); Peoria, IL
02/14/2016; 3:00 pm, ESPNU	Evansville	L 73–74	12–14 (5–9)	Joseph J. Gentile Arena (2,257); Chicago, IL
02/17/2016; 3:00 pm, ESPN3	Northern Iowa	W 59–56	13–14 (6–9)	Joseph J. Gentile Arena (1,690); Chicago, IL
02/21/2016; 3:00 pm, ESPNU/ESPN3	at Missouri State	W 75–62	14–14 (7–9)	JQH Arena (3,385); Springfield, MO
02/24/2016; 8:00 pm, CSN Chicago	Wichita State	L 54–76	14–15 (7–10)	Joseph J. Gentile Arena (2,709); Chicago, IL
02/27/2016; 1:00 pm, ESPN3	at Drake	L 59–69 ^{OT}	14–16 (7–11)	Knapp Center (3,362); Des Moines, IA
Missouri Valley tournament
03/03/2016; 6:00 pm, ESPN3	vs. Bradley; First round	W 74–66	15–16	Scottrade Center (6,929); St. Louis, MO
03/04/2016; 12:00 pm, ESPN3	vs. Wichita State; Quarterfinals	L 58–65	15–17	Scottrade Center (10,560); St. Louis, MO
*Non-conference game. ^{#}Rankings from Coaches' Poll. (#) Tournament seedings in parentheses. All times are in Central Time.
