= 2015–16 Northern Iowa Panthers men's basketball team =

American college basketball season

2015–16 Northern Iowa Panthers men's basketball

Missouri Valley tournament champions

NCAA tournament, Second Round
- Conference: Missouri Valley Conference
- Record: 23–13 (11–7 MVC)
- Head coach: Ben Jacobson (10th season)
- Assistant coaches: Erik Crawford; Kyle Green; P.J. Hogan
- Home arena: McLeod Center

2015–16 Missouri Valley Conference men's basketball standings
	Conf.				Overall
Team	W		L	PCT	W		L	PCT
Wichita State	16	–	2	.889	26	–	9	.743
Evansville	12	–	6	.667	25	–	9	.735
Illinois State	12	–	6	.667	18	–	14	.563
Southern Illinois	11	–	7	.611	22	–	10	.688
Northern Iowa †	11	–	7	.611	23	–	13	.639
Indiana State	8	–	10	.444	15	–	17	.469
Missouri State	8	–	10	.444	13	–	19	.406
Loyola Chicago	7	–	11	.389	15	–	17	.469
Bradley	3	–	15	.167	5	–	27	.156
Drake	2	–	16	.111	7	–	24	.226
† 2016 MVC tournament winner

The 2015–16 Northern Iowa Panthers men's basketball team represented the University of Northern Iowa during the 2015–16 NCAA Division I men's basketball season. The Panthers, led by tenth year head coach Ben Jacobson, played their home games at the McLeod Center and were members of the Missouri Valley Conference (The Valley). They finished the 23–13, 11–7 in Missouri Valley play to finish in a tie for fourth place. The Panthers defeated Southern Illinois, Wichita State, and Evansville to win the Missouri Valley tournament and earn the conference's automatic bid to the NCAA tournament. As a No. 11 seed, they defeated Texas in the first round to advance to the second round, where they lost to the Texas A&M Aggies in double overtime after suffering the greatest collapse in NCAA Tournament history, blowing a 12 point lead with 35 seconds left in regulation.

== Previous season ==
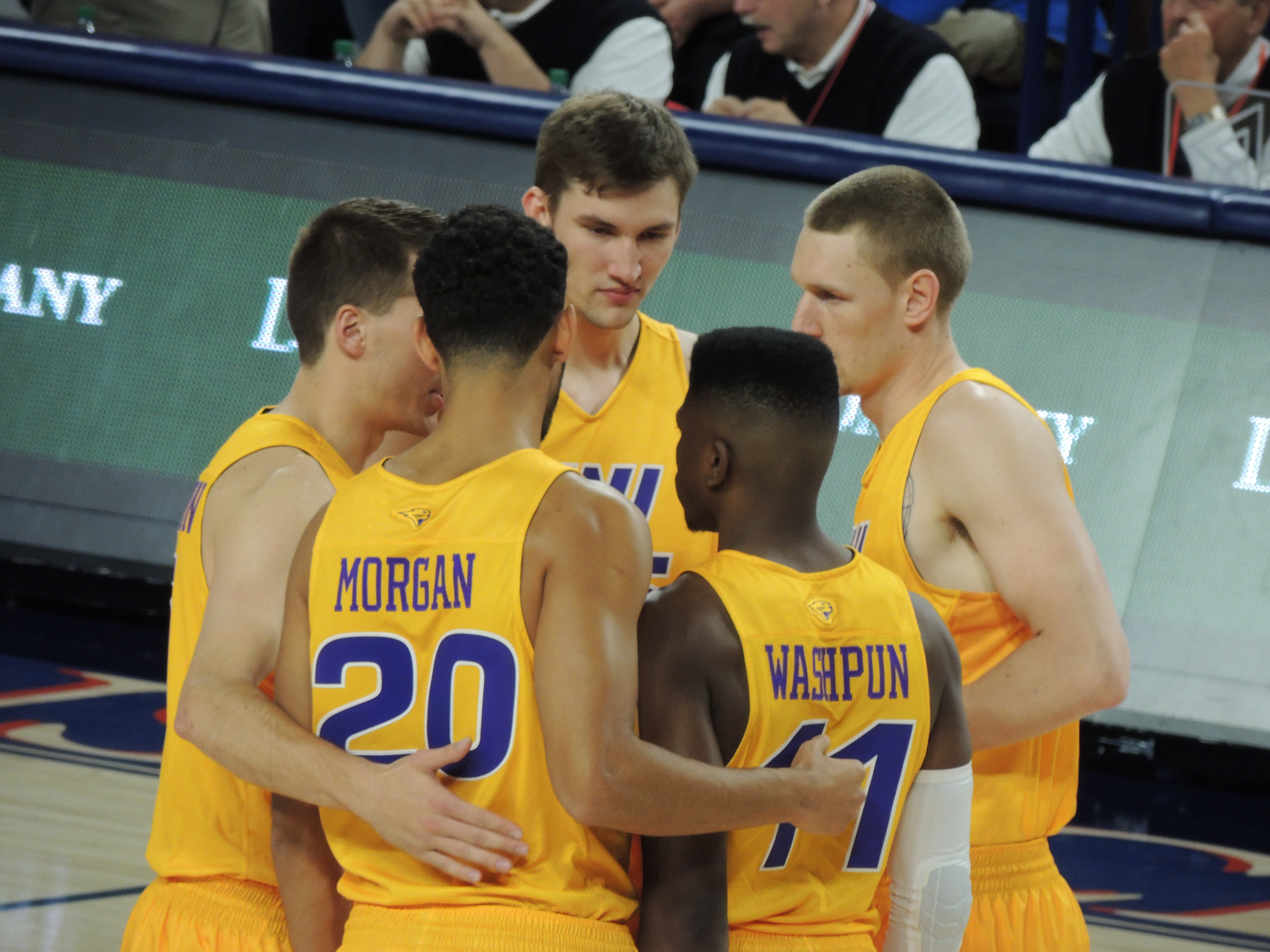
The Panthers' starting five huddle during their December 5 game vs. Richmond.

The Panthers finished the 2014–15 season 31–4, 16–2 in MVC play to finish in second place. They defeated Bradley, Loyola–Chicago, and Illinois State to win the Missouri Valley tournament and received the conference's automatic bid to the NCAA tournament. In the Tournament, they defeated Wyoming in the second round before losing in the Third Round to Louisville.

== Departures ==
Name	Number	Pos.	Height	Weight	Year	Hometown	Notes
Nate Buss	14	F	6'9"	212	Senior	Charles City, IA	Graduated
Max Martino	24	G	6'5"	215	Senior	Cedar Rapids, IA	Graduated
Deon Mitchell	1	G	6'1"	196	Senior	Pflugerville, TX	Graduated
Marvin Singleton	12	F	6'6"	237	Senior	Minneapolis, MN	Graduated
Seth Tuttle	10	F	6'8"	220	Senior	Sheffield, IA	Graduated

=== Incoming transfers ===
Name	Number	Pos.	Height	Weight	Year	Hometown	Previous School
Aarias Austin	1	G	6'4"	180	Junior	Gurnee, IL	Junior college transfer from Des Moines Area Community College.

== Incoming recruits ==
College recruiting information
Name	Hometown	School	Height	Weight	Commit date
Luke McDonnell; PF	Dubuque, IA	Dubuque Senior High School	6 ft 8 in (2.03 m)	200 lb (91 kg)	Sep 18, 2013
Luke McDonnell; PF	Recruit ratings: Scout: Rivals: (NR)				
Spencer Haldeman; PG	Epworth, IA	Western Dubuque High School	6 ft 1 in (1.85 m)	170 lb (77 kg)	May 12, 2014
Spencer Haldeman; PG	Recruit ratings: Scout: Rivals: (NR)				
Justin Dahl; C	Eden Prairie, MN	Holy Family Catholic High School	6 ft 11 in (2.11 m)	225 lb (102 kg)	Aug 8, 2014
Justin Dahl; C	Recruit ratings: Scout: Rivals: (NR)				
Lincoln Conrey; SF	Waterloo, IA	Waterloo West High School	6 ft 7 in (2.01 m)	230 lb (100 kg)	Apr 15, 2015
Lincoln Conrey; SF	Recruit ratings: Scout: Rivals: (NR)				
Overall recruit ranking:
Note: In many cases, Scout, Rivals, 247Sports, On3, and ESPN may conflict in their listings of height and weight.; In these cases, the average was taken. ESPN grades are on a 100-point scale.; Sources: "2015 Team Ranking". Rivals.

=== 2016 recruiting class ===
College recruiting information (2016)
Name	Hometown	School	Height	Weight	Commit date
Juwan McCloud; PG	Germantown, WI	Germantown High School	5 ft 11 in (1.80 m)	150 lb (68 kg)	May 9, 2015
Juwan McCloud; PG	Recruit ratings: Scout: Rivals: (NR)				
Overall recruit ranking:
Note: In many cases, Scout, Rivals, 247Sports, On3, and ESPN may conflict in their listings of height and weight.; In these cases, the average was taken. ESPN grades are on a 100-point scale.; Sources: "2016 Team Ranking". Rivals.

== Roster ==
2015–16 Northern Iowa Panthers men's basketball team
Players
Coaches

Pos.	#	Name	Height	Weight	Year	Previous school	Hometown
G	1	Aarias Austin	6 ft 4 in (1.93 m)	180 lb (82 kg)	Jr	Des Moines Area CC; Warren Township	Gurnee, IL
F	2	Klint Carlson	6 ft 7 in (2.01 m)	225 lb (102 kg)	RS So	Waverly-Shell Rock	Waverly, IA
C	3	Ted Friedman	6 ft 9 in (2.06 m)	245 lb (111 kg)	RS So	Ankeny	Ankeny, IA
G	4	Paul Jesperson	6 ft 6 in (1.98 m)	206 lb (93 kg)	RS Sr	Virginia; Merrill	Merrill, WI
G	5	Matt Bohannon	6 ft 4 in (1.93 m)	195 lb (88 kg)	Sr	Linn-Mar	Marion, IA
G	11	Wes Washpun	6 ft 1 in (1.85 m)	175 lb (79 kg)	Sr	Washington	Cedar Rapids, IA
F	12	Lincoln Conrey	6 ft 7 in (2.01 m)	230 lb (104 kg)	Fr	Waterloo West	Waterloo, IA
C	15	Justin Dahl	6 ft 11 in (2.11 m)	250 lb (113 kg)	Fr	Holy Family	Carver, MN
G	20	Jeremy Morgan	6 ft 5 in (1.96 m)	192 lb (87 kg)	Jr	Iowa City West	Coralville, IA
G	22	Robert Knar	6 ft 1 in (1.85 m)	180 lb (82 kg)	RS So	Mundelein	Mundelein, IL
F	25	Bennett Koch	6 ft 9 in (2.06 m)	232 lb (105 kg)	RS So	Ashwaubenon	Ashwaubenon, WI
G	30	Spencer Haldeman	6 ft 1 in (1.85 m)	170 lb (77 kg)	Fr	Western Dubuque	Peosta, IA
G	33	Wyatt Lohaus	6 ft 2 in (1.88 m)	185 lb (84 kg)	So	Iowa City West	North Liberty, IA
F	35	Luke McDonnell	6 ft 9 in (2.06 m)	210 lb (95 kg)	Fr	Dubuque Senior	Dubuque, IA

Head coach

- Ben Jacobson (North Dakota)

Assistant coach(es)

- Erik Crawford (Iowa State)
- Kyle Green (Hamline)
- P.J. Hogan (Morningside)

Legend

- (C) Team captain
- (S) Suspended
- (I) Ineligible
- (W) Walk-on
- Injured
- Current redshirt

Roster

== Schedule ==
Date time, TV	Rank^{#}	Opponent^{#}	Result	Record	Site (attendance) city, state
Exhibition
11/01/2015*; 4:00 pm		Truman State	W 70–50		McLeod Center (4,455); Cedar Falls, IA
Non-conference regular season
11/14/2015*; 11:00 am		Colorado State; MW–MVC Challenge	L 78–84	0–1	McLeod Center (4,455); Cedar Falls, IA
11/17/2015*; 7:00 am, ESPN2		Stephen F. Austin; College Hoops Tip-Off Marathon	W 70–60	1–1	McLeod Center (4,720); Cedar Falls, IA
11/21/2015*; 1:00 pm, ESPN3		No. 1 North Carolina	W 71–67	2–1	McLeod Center (7,018); Cedar Falls, IA
11/25/2015*; 7:00 pm, ESPN3		Dubuque	W 83–63	3–1	McLeod Center (4,578); Cedar Falls, IA
11/28/2015*; 2:00 pm, MidcoSN		at North Dakota	W 97–51	4–1	Betty Engelstad Sioux Center (2,302); Grand Forks, ND
11/30/2015*; 7:00 pm, ESPN3		North Texas	W 93–70	5–1	McLeod Center; Cedar Falls, IA
12/05/2015*; 5:00 pm, CSN		at Richmond	L 67–82	5–2	Robins Center (6,323); Richmond, VA
12/08/2015*; 6:00 pm, ASN		at George Mason	W 73–65	6–2	EagleBank Arena (4,102); Fairfax, VA
12/12/2015*; 8:00 pm, ESPN3		at New Mexico; Diamond Head Classic mainland round	L 57–76	6–3	The Pit (13,154); Albuquerque, NM
12/19/2015*; 6:00 pm, ESPNU		vs. No. 5 Iowa State; Big Four Classic	W 81–79	7–3	Wells Fargo Arena (15,424); Des Moines, IA
12/22/2015*; 12:30 am, ESPN2		at Hawaiʻi; Diamond Head Classic quarterfinals	L 52–68	7–4	Stan Sheriff Center (8,463); Honolulu, HI
12/23/2015*; 10:30 pm, ESPNU		vs. Washington State; Diamond Head Classic consolation	W 63–59	8–4	Stan Sheriff Center (7,365); Honolulu, HI
12/25/2015*; 2:30 pm, ESPNU		vs. BYU; Diamond Head Classic 5th place game	L 76–84	8–5	Stan Sheriff Center (6,172); Honolulu, HI
Missouri Valley Conference regular season
12/30/2015; 7:00 pm, ESPN3		Bradley	W 80–44	9–5 (1–0)	McLeod Center (5,230); Cedar Falls, IA
01/02/2016; 7:00 pm, ESPN3		at Southern Illinois	L 73–75	9–6 (1–1)	SIU Arena (6,106); Carbondale, IL
01/06/2016; 7:00 pm, ESPN3		at Missouri State	L 58–59	9–7 (1–2)	JQH Arena (4,297); Springfield, MO
01/09/2016; 7:00 pm, ESPN3		Drake	W 77–44	10–7 (2–2)	McLeod Center (5,105); Cedar Falls, IA
01/13/2016; 6:00 pm, ESPN3		at Indiana State	L 60–74	10–8 (2–3)	Hulman Center (3,544); Terre Haute, IN
01/16/2016; 3:00 pm, ESPN3		Loyola–Chicago	L 41–51	10–9 (2–4)	McLeod Center (6,033); Cedar Falls, IA
01/20/2016; 7:00 pm, ESPN3		Wichita State	L 55–74	10–10 (2–5)	McLeod Center (5,425); Cedar Falls, IA
01/23/2016; 3:00 pm		at Illinois State	L 67–76	10–11 (2–6)	Redbird Arena (7,103); Normal, IL
01/27/2016; 8:00 pm, ESPN3		at Bradley	W 68–50	11–11 (3–6)	Carver Arena (5,334); Peoria, IL
01/31/2016; 3:00 pm, ESPN3		Southern Illinois	W 67–58	12–11 (4–6)	McLeod Center (5,275); Cedar Falls, IA
02/03/2016; 6:00 pm, ESPN3		Evansville	W 57–54	13–11 (5–6)	McLeod Center (4,805); Cedar Falls, IA
02/06/2016; 1:00 pm, CBSSN		at Drake	W 82–66	14–11 (6–6)	Knapp Center (4,724); Des Moines, IA
02/10/2016; 7:00 pm, ESPN3		Missouri State	W 83–69	15–11 (7–6)	McLeod Center (5,755); Cedar Falls, IA
02/13/2016; 11:00 am, ESPN2		at No. 25 Wichita State	W 53–50	16–11 (8–6)	Charles Koch Arena (10,506); Wichita, KS
02/17/2016; 7:00 pm, ESPN3		at Loyola–Chicago	L 56–59	16–12 (8–7)	Joseph J. Gentile Arena (1,690); Chicago, IL
02/20/2016; 3:00 pm, CBSSN		Illinois State	W 75–66	17–12 (9–7)	McLeod Center (6,145); Cedar Falls, IA
02/24/2016; 7:00 pm, ESPN3		Indiana State	W 66–44	18–12 (10–7)	McLeod Center (5,911); Cedar Falls, IA
02/27/2016; 1:00 pm, ESPN3		at Evansville	W 54–52	19–12 (11–7)	Ford Center (6,552); Evansville, IN
Missouri Valley tournament
03/04/2016; 2:30 pm, ESPN3	(4)	vs. (5) Southern Illinois; Quarterfinals	W 66–60	20–12	Scottrade Center (10,560); St. Louis, MO
03/05/2016; 2:30 pm, CBSSN	(4)	vs. (1) Wichita State; Semifinals	W 57–52 ^{OT}	21–12	Scottrade Center (14,299); St. Louis, MO
03/06/2016; 1:00 pm, CBS	(4)	vs. (2) Evansville; Championship	W 56–54	22–12	Scottrade Center (14,299); St. Louis, MO
NCAA tournament
03/18/2016*; 8:50 pm, TBS	(11 W)	vs. (6 W) Texas; First Round	W 75–72	23–12	Chesapeake Energy Arena (15,279); Oklahoma City, OK
03/20/2016*; 6:40 pm, truTV	(11 W)	vs. (3 W) No. 15 Texas A&M; Second Round	L 88–92 ^{2OT}	23–13	Chesapeake Energy Arena (15,279); Oklahoma City, OK
*Non-conference game. ^{#}Rankings from AP Poll. (#) Tournament seedings in parentheses. W=West Region. All times are in Central Time.
