= 2015–16 Wichita State Shockers men's basketball team =

American college basketball season

2015–16 Wichita State Shockers men's basketball

MVC regular season champions

NCAA tournament, Second Round
- Conference: Missouri Valley Conference
- Record: 26–9 (16–2 MVC)
- Head coach: Gregg Marshall (9th season)
- Assistant coaches: Greg Heiar; Isaac Brown; Kyle Lindsted
- Home arena: Charles Koch Arena (10,506)

2015–16 Missouri Valley Conference men's basketball standings
	Conf.				Overall
Team	W		L	PCT	W		L	PCT
Wichita State	16	–	2	.889	26	–	9	.743
Evansville	12	–	6	.667	25	–	9	.735
Illinois State	12	–	6	.667	18	–	14	.563
Southern Illinois	11	–	7	.611	22	–	10	.688
Northern Iowa †	11	–	7	.611	23	–	13	.639
Indiana State	8	–	10	.444	15	–	17	.469
Missouri State	8	–	10	.444	13	–	19	.406
Loyola Chicago	7	–	11	.389	15	–	17	.469
Bradley	3	–	15	.167	5	–	27	.156
Drake	2	–	16	.111	7	–	24	.226
† 2016 MVC tournament winner

The 2015–16 Wichita State Shockers men's basketball team represented Wichita State University in the 2015–16 NCAA Division I men's basketball season. They played their home games Charles Koch Arena and were led by ninth-year head coach Gregg Marshall. They were members of the Missouri Valley Conference. They finished the season 26–9, 16–2 in Missouri Valley play to win the MVC regular season championship. They lost in the semifinals of the MVC tournament to Northern Iowa. The Shockers received an at-large bid to the NCAA tournament as an 11 seed. They defeated Vanderbilt in the First Four and Arizona in the first round before losing to Miami (FL) in the second round.

== Previous season ==
The Shockers finished the 2014–15 season 30–5, 17–1 in MVC play to win the regular season Missouri Valley championship. They advanced to the semifinals of the Missouri Valley tournament where they lost to Illinois State. They received an at-large bid to the NCAA tournament where they defeated Indiana in the second round and Kansas in the Third Round before losing in the Sweet Sixteen to Notre Dame.

== Departures ==
Name	Number	Pos.	Height	Weight	Year	Hometown	Reason
Darius Carter	12	F	6'7"	245	Senior	Akron, OH	Graduated
Tekele Cotton	32	G	6'3"	205	Senior	Marietta, GA	Graduated

=== Incoming transfers ===
Name	Number	Pos.	Height	Weight	Year	Hometown	Previous School	Notes
Anton Grady	15	F	6'8"	225	Senior (redshirt)	Cleveland, OH	Cleveland State	Graduate transfer

== Class of 2015 recruits ==
College recruiting
Name	Hometown	School	Height	Weight	Commit date
Markis McDuffie; SF	Jersey City, NJ	St. Anthony High School	6 ft 8 in (2.03 m)	170 lb (77 kg)	Oct 26, 2014
Markis McDuffie; SF	Recruit ratings: Scout: Rivals: (81)				
Landry Shamet; SG	Kansas City, MO	Park Hill High School	6 ft 4 in (1.93 m)	180 lb (82 kg)	Sep 3, 2014
Landry Shamet; SG	Recruit ratings: Scout: Rivals: (77)				
Tyrone Taylor; SG	Grandview, MO	Hargrave Military Academy	6 ft 3 in (1.91 m)	170 lb (77 kg)	Sep 28, 2014
Tyrone Taylor; SG	Recruit ratings: Scout: Rivals: (69)				
Eric Hamilton; PF	Duluth, GA	Sunrise Christian Academy	6 ft 8 in (2.03 m)	200 lb (91 kg)	Nov 20, 2013
Eric Hamilton; PF	Recruit ratings: Scout: Rivals: (NR)				
Overall recruit ranking: Scout: Not Ranked Top 20 Rivals: Not Ranked Top 25 ESPN: Not Ranked Top 25
Note: In many cases, Scout, Rivals, 247Sports, On3, and ESPN may conflict in their listings of height and weight.; In these cases, the average was taken. ESPN grades are on a 100-point scale.; Sources: "2015 Wichita State Basketball Commits". Rivals.; "2015 Wichita State Basketball Commits". Scout.; "2015 Wichita State Basketball Commits". ESPN.; "Scout.com Team Recruiting Rankings". Scout.; "2015 Team Ranking". Rivals.

== Roster ==
2015–16 Wichita State Shockers men's basketball team
Players
Coaches

Pos.	#	Name	Height	Weight	Year	Hometown
F	0	Rashard Kelly	6 ft 7 in (2.01 m)	235 lb (107 kg)	So	Fredericksburg, Virginia
F	1	Zach Brown	6 ft 6 in (1.98 m)	213 lb (97 kg)	So	Houston, Texas
G	3	Evan Wessel	6 ft 4 in (1.93 m)	218 lb (99 kg)	Sr	Wichita, Kansas
F	5	Zach Bush (W)	6 ft 6 in (1.98 m)	200 lb (91 kg)	RS Jr	Wichita, Kansas
G	10	Tyrone Taylor	6 ft 2 in (1.88 m)	155 lb (70 kg)	Fr	Grandview, Missouri
G	11	Landry Shamet	6 ft 4 in (1.93 m)	180 lb (82 kg)	Fr	Kansas City, Missouri
F	12	Brett Barney (W)	6 ft 9 in (2.06 m)	215 lb (98 kg)	Fr	Wichita, Kansas
G	14	John Robert Simon (W)	5 ft 10 in (1.78 m)	171 lb (78 kg)	Jr	Oklahoma City, Oklahoma
F	15	Anton Grady	6 ft 8 in (2.03 m)	230 lb (104 kg)	RS Sr	Cleveland, Ohio
C	20	Rauno Nurger	6 ft 10 in (2.08 m)	242 lb (110 kg)	So	Keila, Estonia
C	21	Tom Wamukota	6 ft 11 in (2.11 m)	224 lb (102 kg)	Sr	Bungoma, Kenya
G	22	Peyton Allen	6 ft 4 in (1.93 m)	208 lb (94 kg)	So	Chatham, Illinois
G	23	Fred VanVleet	6 ft 0 in (1.83 m)	195 lb (88 kg)	Sr	Rockford, Illinois
F	24	Shaquille Morris	6 ft 7 in (2.01 m)	261 lb (118 kg)	RS So	Edmond, Oklahoma
F	25	Eric Hamilton	6 ft 9 in (2.06 m)	225 lb (102 kg)	Fr	Duluth, Georgia
G	31	Ron Baker	6 ft 4 in (1.93 m)	220 lb (100 kg)	RS Sr	Scott City, Kansas
F	32	Markis McDuffie	6 ft 8 in (2.03 m)	185 lb (84 kg)	Fr	Jersey City, New Jersey
G	33	Conner Frankamp	6 ft 1 in (1.85 m)	175 lb (79 kg)	RS So	Wichita, Kansas

Head coach

- Gregg Marshall (Randolph–Macon)

Assistant coach(es)

- Greg Heiar (Franciscan)
- Isaac Brown (Louisiana–Monroe)
- Kyle Lindsted (Central Christian (KS))

Legend

- (C) Team captain
- (S) Suspended
- (I) Ineligible
- (W) Walk-on
- Injured
- Current redshirt

Roster

== Schedule ==
Date time, TV	Rank^{#}	Opponent^{#}	Result	Record	High points	High rebounds	High assists	Site (attendance) city, state
Exhibition
November 07, 2015*; 2:00 pm, Cox Kansas	No. 10	Hawaii Pacific	W 91–57		13 – Grady	7 – Wamukota	4 – Baker	Charles Koch Arena (10,506); Wichita, KS
Regular season
November 13, 2015*; 7:00 pm, Cox Kansas	No. 10	Charleston Southern	W 88–63	1–0	15 – Baker	7 – Hamilton	3 – Tied	Charles Koch Arena (10,506); Wichita, KS
November 17, 2015*; 7:00 pm, Cox Kansas	No. 9	at Tulsa	L 67–77	1–1	23 – Baker	9 – Grady	4 – Wessel	Reynolds Center (5,670); Tulsa, OK
November 21, 2015*; 2:00 pm, Cox Kansas	No. 9	Emporia State	W 76–54	2–1	23 – Baker	7 – Wamukota	4 – Baker	Charles Koch Arena (10,506); Wichita, KS
November 26, 2015*; 1:30 pm, ESPN2	No. 20	vs. USC; AdvoCare Invitational first round	L 69–72	2–2	25 – Baker	7 – Tied	5 – Baker	HP Field House (4,629); Lake Buena Vista, FL
November 27, 2015*; 11:00 am, ESPN3	No. 20	vs. Alabama; AdvoCare Invitational Consolation 2nd round	L 60–64	2–3	15 – Baker	7 – Tied	6 – Taylor II	HP Field House (4,170); Lake Buena Vista, FL
November 29, 2015*; 10:00 am, ESPN3	No. 20	vs. Iowa; AdvoCare Invitational 7th place game	L 61–84	2–4	14 – Hamilton	5 – Hamilton	4 – Baker	HP Field House (1,631); Lake Buena Vista, FL
December 05, 2015*; 8:00 pm, ESPNU		at Saint Louis	W 63–58	3–4	14 – Tied	6 – Baker	7 – VanVleet	Chaifetz Arena (8,459); St. Louis, MO
December 09, 2015*; 8:00 pm, ESPN2		UNLV; MW–MVC Challenge	W 56–50	4–4	17 – VanVleet	6 – Tied	4 – VanVleet	Charles Koch Arena (10,506); Wichita, KS
December 12, 2015*; 2:30 pm, ESPN2		No. 25 Utah	W 67–50	5–4	14 – Brown	4 – Tied	6 – VanVleet	Intrust Bank Arena (15,004); Wichita, KS
December 19, 2015*; 11:00 am, FOX		at Seton Hall	L 76–80 ^{OT}	5–5	9 – VanVleet	6 – Grady	7 – Baker	Prudential Center (7,596); Newark, NJ
December 22, 2015*; 7:00 pm, Cox Kansas		Nevada	W 98–69	6–5	17 – Baker	7 – Grady	6 – VanVleet	Charles Koch Arena (10,506); Wichita, KS
December 31, 2015; 1:00 pm, ESPNU		Drake	W 67–47	7–5 (1–0)	14 – Baker	6 – Morris	6 – VanVleet	Charles Koch Arena (10,506); Wichita, KS
January 3, 2016; 1:00 pm, Cox Kansas		at Bradley	W 85–58	8–5 (2–0)	14 – McDuffie	6 – MCDuffie	6 – VanVleet	Carver Arena (6,597); Peoria, IL
January 6, 2016; 7:00 pm, Cox Kansas		Evansville	W 67–64	9–5 (3–0)	17 – Grady	7 – Grady	9 – VanVleet	Charles Koch Arena (10,506); Wichita, KS
January 9, 2016; 3:00 pm, CBSSN		at Southern Illinois	W 83–58	10–5 (4–0)	18 – Baker	12 – VanVleet	6 – VanVleet	SIU Arena (8,284); Carbondale, IL
January 13, 2016; 8:00 pm, Cox Kansas		at Missouri State	W 78–62	11–5 (5–0)	16 – McDuffie	9 – McDuffie	8 – VanVleet	JQH Arena (7,684); Springfield, MO
January 17, 2016; 3:00 pm, ESPN3		Indiana State	W 82–62	12–5 (6–0)	29 – VanVleet	7 – Tied	5 – VanVleet	Charles Koch Arena (10,506); Wichita, KS
January 20, 2016; 7:00 pm, Cox Kansas		at Northern Iowa	W 74–55	13–5 (7–0)	21 – Baker	7 – Baker	7 – VanVleet	McLeod Center (5,425); Cedar Falls, IA
January 23, 2016; 2:00 pm, Cox Kansas		Bradley	W 88–54	14–5 (8–0)	13 – VanVleet	4 – Tied	4 – VanVleet	Charles Koch Arena (10,506); Wichita, KS
January 27, 2016; 8:00 pm, CBSSN	No. 22	Loyola–Chicago	W 80–54	15–5 (9–0)	12 – Morris	7 – Baker	8 – VanVleet	Charles Koch Arena (10,506); Wichita, KS
January 31, 2016; 3:00 pm, ESPNU	No. 22	at Evansville	W 78–65	16–5 (10–0)	32 – VanVleet	8 – Grady	3 – VanVleet	Ford Center (10,034); Evansville, IN
February 3, 2016; 8:00 pm, Cox Kansas	No. 21	Southern Illinois	W 76–55	17–5 (11–0)	13 – Morris	8 – Baker	11 – VanVleet	Charles Koch Arena (10,506); Wichita, KS
February 6, 2016; 9:00 pm, ESPN2	No. 21	at Illinois State	L 53–58	17–6 (11–1)	10 – Tied	6 – Grady	7 – VanVleet	Redbird Arena (8,284); Normal, IL
February 9, 2016; 7:00 pm, Cox Kansas	No. 25	at Drake	W 74–48	18–6 (12–1)	11 – Tied	8 – Kelly	5 – Tied	Knapp Center (3,317); Des Moines, IA
February 13, 2016; 11:00 am, ESPN2	No. 25	Northern Iowa	L 50–53	18–7 (12–2)	12 – Tied	7 – Baker	6 – Baker	Charles Koch Arena (10,506); Wichita, KS
February 15, 2016*; 7:00 pm, Cox Kansas		New Mexico State; Postponed from December 28, 2015	W 71–41	19–7	13 – Baker	6 – Wessel	7 – VanVleet	Charles Koch Arena (10,506); Wichita, KS
February 18, 2016; 6:00 pm, CBSSN		Missouri State	W 99–68	20–7 (13–2)	16 – Brown	8 – Morris	5 – Baker	Charles Koch Arena (10,656); Wichita, KS
February 21, 2016; 3:00 pm, ESPNU		at Indiana State	W 84–54	21–7 (14–2)	14 – Baker	7 – Wessel	8 – VanVleet	Hulman Center (10,200); Terre Haute, IN
February 24, 2016; 8:00 pm, Cox Kansas		at Loyola–Chicago	W 76–64	22–7 (15–2)	19 – Baker	7 – VanVleet	7 – VanVleet	Joseph J. Gentile Arena (2,709); Chicago, IL
February 27, 2016; 1:00 pm, ESPN3		Illinois State	W 74–58	23–7 (16–2)	16 – Grady	8 – Wessel	9 – VanVleet	Charles Koch Arena (10,506); Wichita, KS
Missouri Valley tournament
March 4, 2016; 12:05 pm, ESPN3	(1)	vs. (8) Loyola–Chicago; Quarterfinals	W 66–58	24–7	25 – Baker	6 – Grady	4 – Baker	Scottrade Center (10,560); St. Louis, MO
March 5, 2016; 2:35 pm, CBSSN	(1)	vs. (4) Northern Iowa; Semifinals	L 52–57 ^{OT}	24–8	14 – Grady	9 – Baker	5 – VanVleet	Scottrade Center (14,299); St. Louis, MO
NCAA tournament
March 15, 2016*; 8:10 pm, truTV	(11 S)	vs. (11 S) Vanderbilt; First Four	W 70–50	25–8	14 – Tied	9 – Baker	7 – VanVleet	UD Arena (11,728); Dayton, OH
March 17, 2016*; 7:20 pm, TNT	(11 S)	vs. (6 S) No. 17 Arizona; First Round	W 65–55	26–8	16 – VanVleet	7 – Morris	6 – Baker	Dunkin' Donuts Center (11,559); Providence, RI
March 19, 2016*; 12:10 pm, CBS	(11 S)	vs. (3 S) No. 10 Miami (FL); Second Round	L 57–65	26–9	12 – Tied	6 – Morris	6 – VanVleet	Dunkin' Donuts Center (11,679); Providence, RI
*Non-conference game. ^{#}Rankings from AP Poll. (#) Tournament seedings in parentheses. S=South. All times are in Central Time.

== Rankings ==
Ranking movement Legend: ██ Increase in ranking. ██ Decrease in ranking. ██ Not ranked the previous week. RV=Received votes.
Poll	Pre	Wk 2	Wk 3	Wk 4	Wk 5	Wk 6	Wk 7	Wk 8	Wk 9	Wk 10	Wk 11	Wk 12	Wk 13	Wk 14	Wk 15	Wk 16	Wk 17	Wk 18	Wk 19	Wk 20	Final
AP	10	9	20						RV	RV	RV	22	21	25	RV	RV	RV	RV			N/A
Coaches	12	11	20	24							RV	25	22	24	RV	RV	23	RV			
