= 2016 Missouri Valley Conference men's basketball tournament =

- Classification: Division I
- Season: 2015–16
- Teams: 10
- Site: Scottrade Center; St. Louis, Missouri
- Champions: Northern Iowa (5th title)
- Winning coach: Ben Jacobson (4th title)
- MVP: Wes Washpun (Northern Iowa)
- Television: ESPN3, CBSSN, CBS

2015–16 Missouri Valley Conference men's basketball standings
	Conf.				Overall
Team	W		L	PCT	W		L	PCT
Wichita State	16	–	2	.889	26	–	9	.743
Evansville	12	–	6	.667	25	–	9	.735
Illinois State	12	–	6	.667	18	–	14	.563
Southern Illinois	11	–	7	.611	22	–	10	.688
Northern Iowa †	11	–	7	.611	23	–	13	.639
Indiana State	8	–	10	.444	15	–	17	.469
Missouri State	8	–	10	.444	13	–	19	.406
Loyola Chicago	7	–	11	.389	15	–	17	.469
Bradley	3	–	15	.167	5	–	27	.156
Drake	2	–	16	.111	7	–	24	.226
† 2016 MVC tournament winner

The 2016 Missouri Valley Conference men's basketball tournament, popularly referred to as "Arch Madness", was the Missouri Valley Conference's postseason tournament which was held March 3–6, 2016 at the Scottrade Center in St. Louis. The tournament was won by Northern Iowa, who defeated Evansville in the championship game. As a result, Northern Iowa received the conference's automatic bid to the NCAA tournament.

== Seeds ==
Teams were seeded by conference record, with ties broken by record between the tied teams followed by non-conference strength of schedule, if necessary. The top six seeds received first round byes.

Seed	School	Conference	Tiebreaker
1	Wichita State	16–2	
2	Evansville	12–6	Better RPI than Illinois State
3	Illinois State	12–6	
4	Northern Iowa	11–7	Better RPI than Southern Illinois
5	Southern Illinois	11–7	
6	Indiana State	8–10	Better RPI than Missouri State
7	Missouri State	8–10	
8	Loyola–Chicago	7–11	
9	Bradley	3–15	
10	Drake	2–16	

== Schedule ==
Game	Time*	Matchup	Final score	Television
Opening round – Thursday, March 3
1	6:05 pm	No. 8 Loyola–Chicago vs. No. 9 Bradley	74–66	ESPN3
2	8:35 pm	No. 7 Missouri State vs. No. 10 Drake	69–67	ESPN3
Quarterfinals – Friday, March 4
3	12:05 pm	No. 1 Wichita State vs. No. 8 Loyola-Chicago	66–58	ESPN3
4	2:35 pm	No. 4 Northern Iowa vs. No. 5 Southern Illinois	66–60	ESPN3
5	6:05 pm	No. 2 Evansville vs. No. 7 Missouri State	66–56	ESPN3
6	8:35 pm	No. 3 Illinois State vs. No. 6 Indiana State	57–65	ESPN3
Semifinals – Saturday, March 5
7	2:35 pm	No. 1 Wichita State vs. No. 4 Northern Iowa	52–57^{OT}	CBSSN
8	5:05 pm	No. 2 Evansville vs. No. 6 Indiana State	68–42	CBSSN
Championship – Sunday, March 6
10	1:05 pm	No. 2 Evansville vs. No. 4 Northern Iowa	54–56	CBS
*Game times in CT. Rankings denote tournament seeding.

== Tournament bracket ==
First round Thursday, March 3 MVC TV
8	Loyola–Chicago	74
9	Bradley	66
7	Missouri State	69
10	Drake	67

Quarterfinals; Friday, March 4 MVC TV
1	Wichita State	66
8	Loyola-Chicago	58
4	Northern Iowa	66
5	Southern Illinois	60
2	Evansville	66
7	Missouri State	56
3	Illinois State	57
6	Indiana State	65

Semifinals; Saturday, March 5 CBSSN
1	Wichita State	52
4	Northern Iowa	57*
2	Evansville	68
6	Indiana State	42

Championship; Sunday, March 6 CBS
4	Northern Iowa	56
2	Evansville	54

* denotes overtime period
