= 2015–16 Evansville Purple Aces men's basketball team =

American college basketball season

2015–16 Evansville Purple Aces men's basketball
- Conference: Missouri Valley Conference
- Record: 25–9 (12–6 MVC)
- Head coach: Marty Simmons (9th season)
- Assistant coaches: Doug Novsek; Lennox Forrester; Geoff Alexander
- Home arena: Ford Center

2015–16 Missouri Valley Conference men's basketball standings
	Conf.				Overall
Team	W		L	PCT	W		L	PCT
Wichita State	16	–	2	.889	26	–	9	.743
Evansville	12	–	6	.667	25	–	9	.735
Illinois State	12	–	6	.667	18	–	14	.563
Southern Illinois	11	–	7	.611	22	–	10	.688
Northern Iowa †	11	–	7	.611	23	–	13	.639
Indiana State	8	–	10	.444	15	–	17	.469
Missouri State	8	–	10	.444	13	–	19	.406
Loyola Chicago	7	–	11	.389	15	–	17	.469
Bradley	3	–	15	.167	5	–	27	.156
Drake	2	–	16	.111	7	–	24	.226
† 2016 MVC tournament winner

The 2015–16 Evansville Purple Aces men's basketball team represented the University of Evansville during the 2015–16 NCAA Division I men's basketball season. The Purple Aces, led by ninth year head coach Marty Simmons, played their home games at the Ford Center and were members of the Missouri Valley Conference. They finished the season 25–9, 12–6 in Missouri Valley play to finish in a tie for second place. They defeated Missouri State and Indiana State in the Missouri Valley tournament to advance to the championship game where they lost to Northern Iowa. Despite having 25 wins, they did not participate in a postseason tournament.

== Previous season ==
The Purple Aces finished the 2014–15 season 24–12, 9–9 in MVC play to finish in fifth place. They lost in the quarterfinals of the Missouri Valley tournament to Illinois State. They were invited to the CollegeInsider.com Tournament where they defeated IPFW, Eastern Illinois, Louisiana–Lafayette, Tennessee–Martin, and Northern Arizona to become CIT champions.

== Departures ==
Name	Number	Pos.	Height	Weight	Year	Hometown	Notes
Taylor Stafford	1	G	6'1"	170	Junior	Duluth, MN	Transferred to Western Washington
Jaylor Moore	10	F/C	6'7"	230	Senior	Olive Branch, MS	Graduated

== Class of 2015 recruits ==
College recruiting information
Name	Hometown	School	Height	Weight	Commit date
Dainius Chatkevicius; PF	Orlando, FL	West Oaks Academy	6 ft 9 in (2.06 m)	245 lb (111 kg)	N/A
Dainius Chatkevicius; PF	Recruit ratings: Scout: Rivals: (NR)				
Harris Brown; PG	Indianapolis, IN	T.C. Howe High School	5 ft 11 in (1.80 m)	N/A	Oct 18, 2014
Harris Brown; PG	Recruit ratings: Scout: Rivals: (NR)				
Overall recruit ranking:
Note: In many cases, Scout, Rivals, 247Sports, On3, and ESPN may conflict in their listings of height and weight.; In these cases, the average was taken. ESPN grades are on a 100-point scale.; Sources: "2015 Team Ranking". Rivals.

== Roster ==
2015–16 Evansville Purple Aces men's basketball team
Players
Coaches

Pos.	#	Name	Height	Weight	Year	Previous school	Hometown
G	2	Christian Benzon	6 ft 4 in (1.93 m)	195 lb (88 kg)	Jr	The Rock School	Copenhagen, Denmark
G	3	Jaylon Brown	6 ft 0 in (1.83 m)	185 lb (84 kg)	Jr	Fishers	Fishers, IN
G	4	Duane Gibson	6 ft 3 in (1.91 m)	195 lb (88 kg)	Jr	Villa Angela-St. Joseph	Cleveland, OH
G	5	Mislav Brzoja	6 ft 4 in (1.93 m)	215 lb (98 kg)	RS Jr	Villanova	Zagreb, Croatia
G	12	Adam Wing	6 ft 4 in (1.93 m)	205 lb (93 kg)	Sr	Rowan County	Morehead, KY
G	13	Harris Brown	5 ft 11 in (1.8 m)	175 lb (79 kg)	Fr	Howe	Indianapolis, IN
C	14	Sergej Vucetic	7 ft 1 in (2.16 m)	238 lb (108 kg)	RS Jr	Nebraska	Vrbas, Serbia
F	22	Willie Wiley	6 ft 7 in (2.01 m)	215 lb (98 kg)	RS Jr	Vincennes	Springfield, IL
G	31	D. J. Balentine	6 ft 2 in (1.88 m)	210 lb (95 kg)	Sr	Kokomo	Kokomo, IN
F/C	44	David Howard	6 ft 8 in (2.03 m)	225 lb (102 kg)	RS Jr	Montgomery Bell	Nashville, TN
G/F	50	Blake Simmons	6 ft 5 in (1.96 m)	210 lb (95 kg)	Jr	Castle	Newburgh, IN
C	55	Egidijus Mockevičius	6 ft 10 in (2.08 m)	225 lb (102 kg)	Sr	Lithuanian Edu. Sciences	Kuršėnai, Lithuania

Head coach

- Marty Simmons (Evansville)

Assistant coach(es)

- Doug Novsek (Southern Illinois)
- Lennox Forrester (Evansville)
- Geoff Alexander (Western Illinois)

Legend

- (C) Team captain
- (S) Suspended
- (I) Ineligible
- (W) Walk-on
- Injured
- Current redshirt

Roster

== Schedule ==
Date time, TV	Opponent	Result	Record	Site (attendance) city, state
Exhibition
11/07/2015*; 3:00 pm, ESPN3	Wabash	W 95–65		Ford Center (3,813); Evansville, IN
Non-conference regular season
11/15/2015*; 2:00 pm, ESPN3	Southeast Missouri State	W 80–65	1–0	Ford Center (3,893); Evansville, IN
11/17/2015*; 7:00 pm, ESPN3	Marian (IN)	W 84–59	2–0	Ford Center (3,463); Evansville, IN
11/21/2015*; 12:30 pm, ESPN3	Belmont	W 93–88	3–0	Ford Center (4,227); Evansville, IN
11/26/2015*; 8:00 pm, ESPNU	vs. Providence; Wooden Legacy quarterfinals	L 64–74	3–1	Titan Gym (2,460); Fullerton, CA
11/27/2015*; 8:00 pm, ESPN3	vs. Santa Clara; Wooden Legacy consolation round	W 69–57	4–1	Titan Gym (2,873); Fullerton, CA
11/29/2015*; 1:30 pm, ESPNU	vs. UC Irvine; Wooden Legacy 5th Place Game	W 75–56	5–1	Honda Center (4,393); Anaheim, CA
12/01/2015*; 7:00 pm, ESPN3	Alabama State	W 88–56	6–1	Ford Center (3,702); Evansville, IN
12/05/2015*; 7:30 pm	at Murray State	W 85–81 ^{OT}	7–1	CFSB Center (3,174); Murray, KY
12/08/2015*; 8:00 pm, SECN	at Arkansas	L 76–89	7–2	Bud Walton Arena (13,980); Fayetteville, AR
12/12/2015*; 3:00 pm, ESPN3	Mississippi Valley State	W 95–60	8–2	Ford Center (4,251); Evansville, IN
12/17/2015*; 7:00 pm, ESPN3	Norfolk State	W 84–70	9–2	Ford Center (3,883); Evansville, IN
12/20/2015*; 3:00 pm	at Fresno State; MW–MVC Challenge	W 85–77	10–2	Save Mart Center (5,251); Fresno, CA
12/22/2015*; 7:00 pm, ESPN3	Alabama A&M	W 91–70	11–2	Ford Center (4,746); Evansville, IN
Missouri Valley regular season
12/30/2015; 7:00 pm, ESPN3	Indiana State	W 70–62	12–2 (1–0)	Ford Center (7,801); Evansville, IN
01/02/2016; 3:00 pm, ESPN3	at Missouri State	W 76–59	13–2 (2–0)	JQH Arena (4,023); Springfield, MO
01/06/2016; 7:00 pm, ESPN3	at Wichita State	L 64–67	13–3 (2–1)	Charles Koch Arena (10,506); Wichita, KS
01/09/2016; 3:00 pm, ESPN3	Bradley	W 67–35	25–3 (3–1)	Ford Center (5,873); Evansville, IN
01/12/2016; 7:00 pm, ESPN3	Drake	W 84–65	15–3 (4–1)	Ford Center (4,011); Evansville, IN
01/15/2016; 8:00 pm, ESPN2	at Illinois State	W 66–55	16–3 (5–1)	Redbird Arena (5,148); Normal, IL
01/19/2016; 8:00 pm, CBSSN	Loyola–Chicago	W 74–66	17–3 (6–1)	Ford Center (4,014); Evansville, IN
01/24/2016; 3:00 pm, ESPNU	at Indiana State	L 65–82	17–4 (6–2)	Hulman Center (4,630); Terre Haute, IN
01/28/2016; 7:00 pm, ESPN3	at Southern Illinois	W 85–78 ^{OT}	18–4 (7–2)	SIU Arena (6,345); Carbondale, IL
01/31/2016; 3:00 pm, ESPNU	No. 22 Wichita State	L 65–78	18–5 (7–3)	Ford Center (10,034); Evansville, IN
02/03/2016; 6:00 pm, ESPN3	at Northern Iowa	L 54–57	18–6 (7–4)	McLeod Center (4,805); Cedar Falls, IA
02/06/2016; 11:00 am, ESPN3	Missouri State	W 83–64	19–6 (8–4)	Ford Center (4,556); Evansville, IN
02/11/2016; 8:00 pm, CBSSN	Illinois State	L 60–70	19–7 (8–5)	Ford Center (4,195); Evansville, IN
02/14/2016; 3:00 pm, ESPNU	at Loyola–Chicago	W 74–73	20–7 (9–5)	Joseph J. Gentile Arena (2,257); Chicago, IL
02/17/2016; 8:00 pm, ESPN3	at Drake	W 80–74	21–7 (10–5)	Knapp Center (2,790); Des Moines, IA
02/20/2016; 3:00 pm, ESPN3	Southern Illinois	W 83–71	22–7 (11–5)	Ford Center (7,163); Evansville, IN
02/23/2016; 8:00 pm, ESPN3	at Bradley	W 67–55	23–7 (12–5)	Carver Arena (5,523); Peoria, IL
02/27/2016; 1:00 pm, ESPN3	Northern Iowa	L 52–54	23–8 (12–6)	Ford Center (6,552); Evansville, IN
Missouri Valley tournament
03/04/2016; 6:00 pm, ESPN3	vs. Missouri State; Quarterfinals	W 66–56	24–8	Scottrade Center (8,468); St. Louis, MO
03/05/2016; 5:00 pm, CBSSN	vs. Indiana State; Semifinals	W 68-42	25–8	Scottrade Center (14,299); St. Louis, MO
03/06/2016; 1:00 pm, CBS	vs. Northern Iowa; Championship game	L 54–56	25–9	Scottrade Center (14,299); St. Louis, MO
*Non-conference game. ^{#}Rankings from AP Poll. (#) Tournament seedings in parentheses. All times are in Central Time.
