= 2015–16 Southern Illinois Salukis men's basketball team =

American college basketball season

2015–16 Southern Illinois Salukis men's basketball
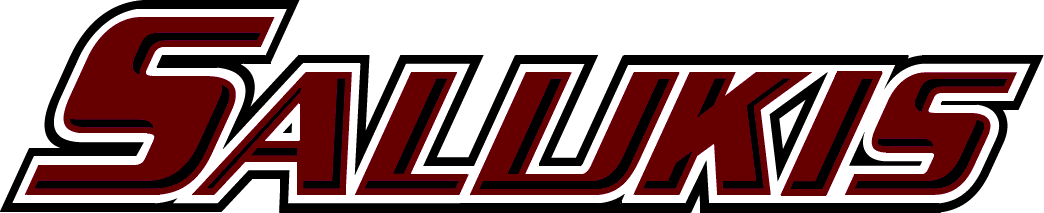
- Conference: Missouri Valley Conference
- Record: 22–10 (11–7 MVC)
- Head coach: Barry Hinson (4th season)
- Assistant coaches: Brad Autry; Anthony Beane, Sr.; Terrance McGee
- Home arena: SIU Arena

2015–16 Missouri Valley Conference men's basketball standings
	Conf.				Overall
Team	W		L	PCT	W		L	PCT
Wichita State	16	–	2	.889	26	–	9	.743
Evansville	12	–	6	.667	25	–	9	.735
Illinois State	12	–	6	.667	18	–	14	.563
Southern Illinois	11	–	7	.611	22	–	10	.688
Northern Iowa †	11	–	7	.611	23	–	13	.639
Indiana State	8	–	10	.444	15	–	17	.469
Missouri State	8	–	10	.444	13	–	19	.406
Loyola Chicago	7	–	11	.389	15	–	17	.469
Bradley	3	–	15	.167	5	–	27	.156
Drake	2	–	16	.111	7	–	24	.226
† 2016 MVC tournament winner

The 2015–16 Southern Illinois Salukis men's basketball team represented Southern Illinois University Carbondale during the 2015–16 NCAA Division I men's basketball season. The Salukis, led by fourth year head coach Barry Hinson, played their home games at the SIU Arena and were members of the Missouri Valley Conference. They finished the season 22–10, 11–7 in Missouri Valley play to finish in a tie for fourth place. They lost in the quarterfinals of the Missouri Valley tournament to Northern Iowa. Despite having 22 wins, citing financial concerns and player fatigue, they chose not to participate in a postseason tournament.

== Previous season ==
The Salukis finished the 2015–16 season 12–21, 4–14 in MVC play to finish in ninth place. They advanced to the quarterfinals of the Missouri Valley tournament where they lost to Northern Iowa.

== Departures ==
Name	Number	Pos.	Height	Weight	Year	Hometown	Notes
Jalen Pendelton	1	G	6'2"	205	Junior	Evansville, IN	Transferred to Minnesota State
K. C. Goodwin	2	G	5'11"	205	RS Freshman	Memphis, TN	Transferred to Union (TN)
Deion Lavender	5	G	6'3"	180	Freshman	Alton, IL	Transferred to UAB
Chaz Glotta	13	G	6'2"	172	Freshman	St. Louis, MO	Transferred to Northern Colorado
Jordan Caroline	14	F	6'6"	235	Freshman	Champaign, IL	Transferred to Nevada
Dawson Verhines	24	G	6'4"	210	Senior	Woodlawn, IL	Graduated

=== Incoming transfers ===
Name	Number	Pos.	Height	Weight	Year	Hometown	Previous School
Mike Rodriguez	1	G	5'10"	160	Junior	Boston, MA	Junior college transferred from Marshalltown Community College
Leo Vincent	5	G	6'1"	180	Junior	Bensalem, PA	Junior college transferred from Harcum College
Aaron Siler	12	G	5'11"	165	Junior	Robinson, IL	Junior college transferred from Lincoln Trail College
Bobby Mannie	14	G	5'11"	165	Junior	Herrin, IL	Junior College transferred from John A. Logan College

== Recruiting ==
College recruiting information
Name	Hometown	School	Height	Weight	Commit date
Sean Lloyd; SF	Philadelphia, PA	Mount Zion Baptist Christian School	6 ft 4 in (1.93 m)	185 lb (84 kg)	Jun 29, 2015
Sean Lloyd; SF	Recruit ratings: Scout: Rivals: (71)				
Overall recruit ranking:
Note: In many cases, Scout, Rivals, 247Sports, On3, and ESPN may conflict in their listings of height and weight.; In these cases, the average was taken. ESPN grades are on a 100-point scale.; Sources: "2015 Team Ranking". Rivals.

== Roster ==
2015–16 Southern Illinois Salukis men's basketball team
Players
Coaches

Pos.	#	Name	Height	Weight	Year	Previous school	Hometown
G	1	Mike Rodriguez	5 ft 10 in (1.78 m)	170 lb (77 kg)	Jr	Marshalltown CC; Redemption Christian Academy	Boston, MA
F	2	Jeremy Postell	6 ft 6 in (1.98 m)	205 lb (93 kg)	Jr	New Mexico JC; Westlake	Atlanta, GA
G	3	Sean Lloyd	6 ft 5 in (1.96 m)	200 lb (91 kg)	Fr	Mt. Zion Prep	Philadelphia, PA
G	5	Leo Vincent	6 ft 1 in (1.85 m)	185 lb (84 kg)	Jr	Harcum College; Bensalem	Bensalem, PA
C	10	Ibby Djimde	6 ft 8 in (2.03 m)	255 lb (116 kg)	RS Sr	Illinois; Huntington Prep	Bamako, Mali
G	11	Tyler Smithpeters	6 ft 3 in (1.91 m)	175 lb (79 kg)	Jr	Harrisburg	Harrisburg, IL
F	15	Austin Weiher	6 ft 8 in (2.03 m)	210 lb (95 kg)	RS Fr	Creating Young Minds Academy	Kent, WA
G	22	Armon Fletcher	6 ft 4 in (1.93 m)	180 lb (82 kg)	RS Fr	Edwardsville	Edwardsville, IL
F	23	Bola Olaniyan	6 ft 7 in (2.01 m)	225 lb (102 kg)	Jr	Richmond	Lagos, Nigeria
G	25	Anthony Beane, Jr.	6 ft 2 in (1.88 m)	190 lb (86 kg)	Sr	Normal	Normal, IL
C	32	Deng Leek	7 ft 0 in (2.13 m)	230 lb (104 kg)	Sr	Jacksonville College; Wesleyan Christian Academy	Sudan
F	33	Sean O'Brien	6 ft 6 in (1.98 m)	210 lb (95 kg)	Jr	Mundelein	Mundelein, IL
F	34	Rudy Stradnieks	6 ft 9 in (2.06 m)	225 lb (102 kg)	Fr	Lee Academy	Riga, Latvia

Head coach

- Barry Hinson (Oklahoma State)

Assistant coach(es)

- Jerome Beane, Sr. (Kansas State)
- Brad Autry (Northwestern Oklahoma State)
- Terrance McGee (Missouri State)

Legend

- (C) Team captain
- (S) Suspended
- (I) Ineligible
- (W) Walk-on
- Injured
- Current redshirt

Roster

== Schedule and results ==
Date time, TV	Opponent	Result	Record	High points	High rebounds	High assists	Site (attendance) city, state
Exhibition
11/09/2015*; 7:00 pm, ESPN3	Maryville	W 106–73		17 – O'Brien	7 – O'Brien	6 – Smithpeters	SIU Arena (3,843); Carbondale, IL
Non-conference regular season
11/13/2015*; 7:00 pm, ESPN3	Air Force; MW–MVC Challenge	W 77–75	1–0	15 – Rodriguez	12 – Olaniyan	3 – Olaniyan, Smithpeters	SIU Arena (4,759); Carbondale, IL
11/15/2015*; 3:00 pm, ESPN3	Florida A&M; Corpus Christi Coastal Classic	W 81–51	2–0	20 – Beane Jr.	12 – Olaniyan	6 – Rodriguez	SIU Arena (4,119); Carbondale, IL
11/18/2015*; 7:00 pm, ESPN3	Kent State	W 72–69	3–0	32 – Beane Jr.	8 – Beane Jr.	3 – Beane Jr. & Rodriguez	SIU Arena (4,362); Carbondale, IL
11/21/2015*; 1:00 pm	at Sam Houston State	W 86–81 ^{OT}	4–0	21 – Beane Jr.	8 – Olaniyan	5 – Rodriguez	Bernard Johnson Coliseum (1,008); Huntsville, TX
11/24/2015*; 7:00 pm, ESPN3	Oakland; Corpus Christi Coastal Classic	W 97–88	5–0	30 – Beane Jr.	9 – O'Brien	5 – Rodriguez	SIU Arena (4,280); Carbondale, IL
11/27/2015*; 5:00 pm, ASN	vs. UTEP; Corpus Christi Coastal Classic semifinals	L 66–71	5–1	25 – O'Brien	11 – O'Brien	4 – Rodriguez	American Bank Center (264); Corpus Christi, TX
11/28/2015*; 7:30 pm, ASN	vs. Portland; Corpus Christi Coastal Classic	W 80–79	6–1	18 – Beane & O'Brien	10 – O'Brien	3 – Rodriguez	American Bank Center (179); Corpus Christi, TX
12/02/2015*; 7:00 pm, ESPN3	Southeast Missouri State	W 74–50	7–1	22 – O'Brien	11 – O'Brien	7 – Rodriguez	SIU Arena (4,781); Carbondale, IL
12/05/2015*; 5:00 pm	at North Texas	W 95–63	8–1	27 – Beane Jr.	5 – Smithpeters	4 – O'Brien	The Super Pit (2,475); Denton, TX
12/09/2015*; 7:00 pm, ESPN3	SIU Edwardsville	L 74–76	8–2	21 – Beane Jr.	11 – Olaniyan	2 – Rodriguez	SIU Arena (4,817); Carbondale, IL
12/12/2015*; 7:00 pm, ESPN3	North Texas	W 74–66	9–2	19 – Beane Jr.	7 – Leek	3 – O'Brien & Beane Jr.	SIU Arena (4,839); Carbondale, IL
12/18/2015*; 7:00 pm	at Murray State	W 88–73	10–2	22 – Beane Jr.	8 – Olaniyan	4 – Rodriguez	CFSB Center (3,784); Murray, KY
12/21/2015*; 7:00 pm, FSMW	at Saint Louis	W 65–52	11–2	19 – Beane Jr.	8 – Olaniyan	2 – 5 tied	Chaifetz Arena (8,758); St. Louis, MO
Missouri Valley Conference regular season
12/30/2015; 7:00 pm	at Loyola–Chicago	W 72–62	12–2 (1–0)	26 – Beane Jr.	10 – Olaniyan	3 – Rodriguez & Vincent	Joseph J. Gentile Arena (1,624); Chicago, IL
01/02/2016; 7:00 pm	Northern Iowa	W 75–73	13–2 (2–0)	32 – Beane Jr.	13 – Olaniyan	4 – Smithpeters	SIU Arena (6,106); Carbondale, IL
01/06/2016; 7:00 pm	at Bradley	W 65-44	14-2 (3-0)	11 – Beane Jr.	10 – Olaniyan	6 – Rodriguez	Carver Arena (5,639); Peoria, IL
01/09/2016; 3:00 pm, CBSSN	Wichita State	L 58–83	14–3 (3–1)	15 – Beane Jr.	8 – Olaniyan	2 – Rodriguez	SIU Arena (8,284); Carbondale, IL
01/12/2016; 7:00 pm, ESPN3	Illinois State	W 81–78	15–3 (4–1)	24 – Vincent	8 – O'Brien	6 – O'Brien	SIU Arena (4,441); Carbondale, IL
01/17/2016; 3:00 pm, ESPNU	at Drake	W 81–76	16–3 (5–1)	26 – Beane Jr.	14 – Olaniyan	4 – Rodriguez	Knapp Center (3,136); Des Moines, IA
01/20/2016; 7:00 pm, ESPN3	Indiana State	W 79-66	17–3 (6–1)	18 – Vincent	4 – 3 tied	4 – Smithpeters	SIU Arena (5,036); Carbondale, IL
01/24/2016; 3:00 pm, ESPN3	at Missouri State	W 80–65	18–3 (7–1)	17 – Olaniyan	6 – Olaniyan & O'Brien	6 – Beane Jr.	JQH Arena; Springfield, MO
01/28/2016; 7:00 pm, ESPN3	Evansville	L 78–85 ^{OT}	18–4 (7–2)	30 – Smithpeters	8 – Olaniyan	3 – O'Brien	SIU Arena (6,345); Carbondale, IL
01/31/2016; 3:00 pm, ESPN3	at Northern Iowa	L 58–67	18–5 (7–3)	16 – Beane	7 – Smithpeters	4 – O'Brien	McLeod Center (5,275); Cedar Falls, IA
02/03/2016; 8:00 pm, FSMW	at No. 21 Wichita State	L 55–76	18–6 (7–4)	20 – Beane	16 – Olaniyan	3 – Rodriguez	Charles Koch Arena (10,506); Wichita, KS
02/06/2016; 7:00 pm, ESPN3	Loyola–Chicago	L 59–73	18–7 (7–5)	18 – Beane	11 – Beane	4 – Rodriguez	SIU Arena (5,788); Carbondale, IL
02/10/2016; 6:00 pm, ESPN3	at Indiana State	W 85–78	19–7 (8–5)	31 – Beane	5 – Beane	2 – Beane/Smithpeters/Vincent	Hulman Center (3,221); Terre Haute, IN
02/13/2016; 3:00 pm, FSMW	Drake	W 75–60	20–7 (9–5)	31 – Beane	10 – Olaniyan	4 – O'Brien	SIU Arena (5,474); Carbondale, IL
02/17/2016; 7:00 pm, ESPN3	Bradley	W 71–59	21–7 (10–5)	24 – O'Brien	11 – Olaniyan	7 – Smithpeters	SIU Arena (5,002); Carbondale, IL
02/20/2016; 3:00 pm, FSMW	at Evansville	L 71–83	21–8 (10–6)	22 – Beane	12 – Olaniyan	5 – Beane	Ford Center (7,163); Evansville, IN
02/24/2016; 7:00 pm, FSMW	at Illinois State	L 50–73	21–9 (10–7)	14 – O'Brien	12 – Olaniyan	3 – Beane	Redbird Arena (6,502); Normal, IL
02/27/2016; 7:00 pm, ESPN3	Missouri State	W 78–68	22–9 (11–7)	19 – Beane	13 – Olaniyan	8 – O'Brien	SIU Arena (6,012); Carbondale, IL
Missouri Valley tournament
03/04/2016; 2:30 pm, ESPN3	vs. Northern Iowa; Quarterfinals	L 60–66	22–10	17 – Beane	12 – O'Brien	3 – Beane	Scottrade Center (10,560); St. Louis, MO
*Non-conference game. ^{#}Rankings from AP Poll. (#) Tournament seedings in parentheses. All times are in Central Time.
