= 2017–18 Missouri Valley Conference men's basketball season =

- League: NCAA Division I
- Sport: Basketball
- Teams: 10
- TV partner(s): ESPN3, CBSSN, CBS

Regular season
- 2018 MVC Champions: Loyola
- Season MVP: Clayton Custer

Tournament
- Champions: Loyola
- Runners-up: Illinois State
- Finals MVP: Donte Ingram, Loyola

Basketball seasons
- 2016–17 2018–19

2017–18 Missouri Valley Conference men's basketball standings
	Conf.				Overall
Team	W		L	PCT	W		L	PCT
Loyola Chicago †	15	–	3	.833	32	–	6	.842
Southern Illinois	11	–	7	.611	20	–	13	.606
Illinois State	10	–	8	.556	18	–	15	.545
Drake	10	–	8	.556	17	–	17	.500
Bradley	9	–	9	.500	20	–	13	.606
Indiana State	8	–	10	.444	13	–	18	.419
Missouri State	7	–	11	.389	18	–	15	.545
Evansville	7	–	11	.389	17	–	15	.531
Northern Iowa	7	–	11	.389	16	–	16	.500
Valparaiso	6	–	12	.333	15	–	17	.469
† 2018 MVC tournament winner

The 2017–18 Missouri Valley Conference men's basketball season began with practices in October 2017, followed by the start of the 2017–18 NCAA Division I men's basketball season in November. Conference play began in late December 2017 and concluded in March with the Missouri Valley Conference tournament at Scottrade Center in St. Louis, Missouri.

With a win against Evansville on February 18, 2018, Loyola clinched at least a share of its first-ever Missouri Valley Conference regular season championship. With a win over Southern Illinois on February 21, the Ramblers clinched the outright MVC championship.

Loyola defeated Illinois State in the championship game to win the MVC tournament and received the conference's automatic bid to the NCAA tournament.

This season marked the first season with Valparaiso as a member of the conference. The Crusaders were invited to join the conference after Wichita State left the conference to join the American Athletic Conference.

Loyola received the conference's only bid to the NCAA tournament and advanced to the Final Four before losing to Michigan.

Drake was the only other conference school that received a bid to a postseason tournament, receiving a bid to the CollegeInsider.com Tournament where they went 1–1.

== Head coaches ==
=== Coaching changes ===
Drake's fourth-year head coach Ray Giacoletti resigned on December 6, 2016 after the first eight games of the season. Assistant coach Jeff Rutter was named interim head coach. Following the season, the school chose not to keep Jeff Rutter as head coach and hired Niko Medved, former head coach at Furman, as the Bulldogs' new head coach.

=== Coaches ===
Team	Head coach	Previous job	Years at school	Overall record	MVC record	MVC titles	NCAA tournaments
Bradley	Brian Wardle	Green Bay	3	38–60	19–35	0	0
Drake	Niko Medved	Furman	1	17–17	10–8	0	0
Evansville	Marty Simmons	SIU Edwardsville	11	184–175	82–116	0	0
Illinois State	Dan Muller	Vanderbilt (Asst.)	6	122–80	75–48	1	0
Indiana State	Greg Lansing	Indiana State (Asst.)	8	133–126	73–71	0	1
Loyola	Porter Moser	Saint Louis (Asst.)	7	121–111	42–58	1	1
Missouri State	Paul Lusk	Purdue (Asst.)	7	106–121	52–75	0	0
Northern Iowa	Ben Jacobson	Northern Iowa (Asst.)	12	250–150	130–86	2	4
Southern Illinois	Barry Hinson	Kansas (Adm.)	6	99–96	47–55	0	0
Valparaiso	Matt Lottich	Valparaiso (Asst.)	2	39–26	6–12	0	0

Notes:

- All records, appearances, titles, etc. are from time with current school only.
- Overall and MVC records are from time at current school and are through the end of the season.
- Lottich and Moser's conference records only includes MVC play, not prior Horizon League records.

== Preseason ==
=== Preseason poll ===
Rank	Team
1.	Missouri State (30)
2.	Northern Iowa (8)
3.	Loyola (1)
4.	Illinois State (1)
5.	Southern Illinois
6.	Valparaiso
7.	Bradley
8.	Indiana State
9.	Evansville
10.	Drake
(first place votes)

=== Preseason All-MVC teams ===
Honor	Recipient
Preseason Player of the Year	Alize Johnson, Missouri State
Preseason All-MVC First Team
Preseason All-MVC First Team	Donte Ingram, Loyola
Preseason All-MVC First Team	Brenton Scott, Indiana State
Preseason All-MVC First Team	Bennett Koch, Northern Iowa
Preseason All-MVC First Team	Reed Timmer, Drake
Preseason All-MVC First Team	Aundre Jackson, Loyola
Preseason All-MVC Second Team
Preseason All-MVC Second Team	Thik Bol, Southern Illinois
Preseason All-MVC Second Team	Darrell Brown, Bradley
Preseason All-MVC Second Team	Klint Carlson, Northern Iowa
Preseason All-MVC Second Team	Phil Fayne, Illinois State
Preseason All-MVC Second Team	Tevonn Walker, Valparaiso

== Regular season ==
=== Conference matrix ===
This table summarizes the head-to-head results between teams in conference play. Each team played 18 conference games, playing each team twice.

	Bradley	Drake	Evansville	Illinois State	Indiana State	Loyola	Missouri State	Northern Iowa	Southern Illinois	Valparaiso
vs. Bradley	–	2–0	1–1	1–1	0–1	1–1	0–2	1–1	1–1	1–1
vs. Drake	0–2	–	1–1	1–1	0–2	2–0	0–2	1–1	1–1	2–0
vs. Evansville	1–1	1–1	–	2–0	2–0	2–0	1–1	1–1	1–1	0–2
vs. Illinois State	1–1	1–1	0–2	–	1–1	2–0	0–2	1–1	1–1	1–1
vs. Indiana State	1–1	2–0	0–2	1–1	–	1–1	2–0	0–2	2–0	1–1
vs. Loyola	1–1	0–2	0–2	0–2	1–1	–	1–1	0–2	0–2	0–2
vs. Missouri State	2–0	2–0	1–1	2–0	0–2	1–1	–	1–1	2–0	0–2
vs. Northern Iowa	1–1	1–1	1–1	1–1	2–0	2–0	1–1	–	2–0	0–2
vs. Southern Illinois	1–1	1–1	1–1	1–1	0–2	1–0	0–2	0–2	–	1–1
vs. Valparaiso	1–1	0–2	2–0	1–1	1–1	1–0	2–0	2–0	1–1	–
Total	9–9	10–8	7–11	10–8	7–11	15–3	7–11	7–11	11–7	6–12

=== Player of the week ===
Throughout the regular season, the Missouri Valley Conference named a player and newcomer of the week.

Week	Player of the week	Newcomer of the week
November 13, 2017	Brenton Scott, Indiana State	Kavion Pippen, Southern Illinois
November 20, 2017	Keyshawn Evans, Illinois State	Marques Townes, Loyola
November 27, 2017	Donte Ingram, Loyola	Tywhon Pickford, Northern Iowa
December 4, 2017	Bennett Koch, Northern Iowa	Kavion Pippen (2), Southern Illinois
December 11, 2017	Dru Smith, Evansville	Cameron Krutwig, Loyola
December 18, 2017	Milik Yarbrough, Illinois State	Milik Yarbrough, Illinois State
December 26, 2017	Alize Johnson, Missouri State	Milik Yarbrough (2), Illinois State
January 2, 2018	Milik Yarbrough (2), Illinois State	Milik Yarbrough (3), Illinois State
January 8, 2018	Reed Timmer, Drake	J. T. Miller, Missouri State
January 15, 2018	Alize Johnson (2), Missouri State	Tywhon Pickford (2), Northern Iowa
January 22, 2018	Donte Ingram (2), Loyola	Cameron Krutwig (2), Loyola
January 29, 2018	Clayton Custer, Loyola	Milik Yarbrough (4), Illinois State
February 5, 2018	Reed Timmer, Drake Ryan Taylor, Evansville	Kavion Pippen (2), Southern Illinois
February 12, 2018	Alize Johnson (3), Missouri State	Kavion Pippen (3), Southern Illinois
February 19, 2018	Reed Timmer (2), Drake	Milik Yarbrough (5), Illinois State

== Conference Awards ==
Award	Recipients
Larry Bird Player of the Year	Clayton Custer, Loyola
Coach of the Year	Porter Moser, Loyola
Newcomer of the Year	Clayton Custer, Loyola
Freshman of the Year	Cameron Krutwig, Loyola
Defensive MVP	Ben Richardson, Loyola
Sixth-Man of the Year	Tyler Smithpeters, Southern Illinois
All-MVC First Team	Clayton Custer, Loyola; Alize Johnson, Missouri State; Ryan Taylor, Evansville; Reed Timmer, Drake; Milik Yarbrough, Illinois State
All-MVC Second Team	Jorand Barnes, Indiana State; Phil Fayne, Illinois State; Armon Fletcher, Southern Illinois; Donte Ingram, Loyola; Donte Thomas, Bradley
All-MVC Third Team	Darrel Brown, Bradley; Bennett Koch, Northern Iowa; Cameron Krutwig, Loyola; Kavion Pippen, Southern Illinois; Brenton Scott, Indiana State
All-Newcomer Team	Bakari Evelyn, Valparaiso; Cameron Krutwig, Loyola; Tywhon Pickford, Northern Iowa; Kavion Pippen, Southern Illinois; Milik Yarbrough, Illinois State
All-Freshmen Team	Elijah Childs, Bradley; Tyreke Key, Indiana State; Cameron Krutwig, Loyola; Tywhon Pickford, Northern Iowa; Lucas Williamson, Loyola
All-Defensive Team	Obediah Church, Missouri State; Dwante Lautier-Ogunleye, Bradley; Sean Lloyd, Southern Illinois; Ben Richardson, Loyola; Tevonn Walker, Valparaiso

== Postseason ==
=== Missouri Valley Conference tournament ===
Teams were seeded by conference record, with ties broken by record between the tied teams followed by overall adjusted RPI, if necessary. The top six seeds received first-round byes.

First round Thursday, March 1 MVC TV/ESPN3
8	Evansville	50
9	Northern Iowa	60
7	Missouri State	83
10	Valparaiso	79

Quarterfinals; Friday, March 2 MVC TV/ESPN3
1	Loyola–Chicago	54
9	Northern Iowa	50
4	Drake	61
5	Bradley	63
2	Southern Illinois	67
7	Missouri State	63
3	Illinois State	77
6	Indiana State	70

Semifinals; Saturday, March 3 CBSSN
1	Loyola–Chicago	62
5	Bradley	54
2	Southern Illinois	68
3	Illinois State	76*

Championship; Sunday, March 4 CBS
1	Loyola–Chicago	65
3	Illinois State	49

* denotes overtime period

=== NCAA tournament ===
The winner of the MVC tournament, Loyola, received the conference's automatic bid to the 2018 NCAA Division I men's basketball tournament.

Seed	Region	School	First Four	First round	Second round	Sweet Sixteen	Elite Eight	Final Four	Championship
11	South	Loyola	N/A	defeated (6) Miami 64–62	defeated (3) Tennessee 63–62	defeated (7) Nevada 69–68	defeated (9) Kansas State 78–62	lost to (3) Michigan 69–57	
		W–L (%):	0–0 (–)	1–0 (1.000)	1–0 (1.000)	1–0 (1.000)	1–0 (1.000)	0–1 (.000)	0–0 (–) Total: 4–1 (.800)
