= 2017–18 Indiana State Sycamores men's basketball team =

American college basketball season

2017–18 Indiana State Sycamores men's basketball
- Conference: Missouri Valley Conference
- Record: 13–18 (8–10 MVC)
- Head coach: Greg Lansing (8th season)
- Assistant coaches: Marcus Belcher; Terry Parker; Brett Carey
- Home arena: Hulman Center

2017–18 Missouri Valley Conference men's basketball standings
	Conf.				Overall
Team	W		L	PCT	W		L	PCT
Loyola Chicago †	15	–	3	.833	32	–	6	.842
Southern Illinois	11	–	7	.611	20	–	13	.606
Illinois State	10	–	8	.556	18	–	15	.545
Drake	10	–	8	.556	17	–	17	.500
Bradley	9	–	9	.500	20	–	13	.606
Indiana State	8	–	10	.444	13	–	18	.419
Missouri State	7	–	11	.389	18	–	15	.545
Evansville	7	–	11	.389	17	–	15	.531
Northern Iowa	7	–	11	.389	16	–	16	.500
Valparaiso	6	–	12	.333	15	–	17	.469
† 2018 MVC tournament winner

The 2017–18 Indiana State Sycamores basketball team represented Indiana State University during the 2017–18 NCAA Division I men's basketball season. The Sycamores, led by eighth-year head coach Greg Lansing, played their home games at the Hulman Center in Terre Haute, Indiana as members of the Missouri Valley Conference. They finished the season 13–18, 8–10 in MVC play to finish in sixth place. They lost in the quarterfinals of the MVC tournament to Illinois State.

== Previous season ==
The Sycamores finished the 2016–17 season 11–20, 5–13 to finish in a tie for ninth place in MVC play. They lost in the first round of the Missouri Valley Conference tournament to Evansville.

== Offseason ==
=== Departures ===
Name	Number	Pos.	Height	Weight	Year	Hometown	Reason for departure
Everett Clemons	0	G	6'1"	185	Senior	Springfield, IL	Graduated
Niels Bunschoten	12	F	6'9"	225	Senior	Bussum, Netherlands	Graduated
Donovan Franklin	13	G	6'5"	195	Sophomore	St. Louis, MO	Transferred to Pittsburg State
Matt Van Scyoc	30	F	6'6"	216	RS Senior	Green Lake, WI	Graduated
Laquarious Paige	32	G	6'3"	180	Junior	West Orange, TX	Transferred to Lamar
T. J. Bell	42	C	6'8"	250	Senior	Charleston, IL	Graduated

=== Incoming transfers ===
Name	Number	Pos.	Height	Weight	Year	Hometown	Previous School
Christian Williams	10	G	6'5"	200	Junior	Decatur, IL	Transferred from Iowa. Under NCAA transfer rules, Williams will have to sit out for the 2017–18 season. Will have two years of remaining eligibility.
Qiydar Davis	25	G	6'6"	220	RS Senior	Atlanta, GA	Transferred from Louisiana Tech. Will be eligible to play immediately since Ashton graduated from Louisiana Tech.
Devin Thomas	35	F	6'8"	205	Junior	Richmond, IN	Junior college transferred from Mineral Area College

=== 2017 recruiting class ===
College recruiting
Name	Hometown	School	Height	Weight	Commit date
Tyreke Key; PG	Celina, TN	Clay County High School	6 ft 2 in (1.88 m)	180 lb (82 kg)	Oct 13, 2016
Tyreke Key; PG	Recruit ratings: Scout: Rivals: (NR)				
Cooper Neese; SG	Cloverdale, IN	Cloverdale High School	6 ft 4 in (1.93 m)	175 lb (79 kg)	Aug 3, 2015
Cooper Neese; SG	Recruit ratings: Scout: Rivals: 247Sports: (79)				
Clayton Hughes; SF	Jackson, TN	Hargrave Military Academy	6 ft 5 in (1.96 m)	180 lb (82 kg)	Apr 28, 2017
Clayton Hughes; SF	Recruit ratings: Scout: Rivals: (NR)				
Daniel Hunermann; PF	St Gallen, Switzerland	Kantonsschule am Burggraben	6 ft 9 in (2.06 m)	225 lb (102 kg)	Oct 16, 2016
Daniel Hunermann; PF	Recruit ratings: Scout: Rivals: (NR)				
Overall recruit ranking:
Note: In many cases, Scout, Rivals, 247Sports, On3, and ESPN may conflict in their listings of height and weight.; In these cases, the average was taken. ESPN grades are on a 100-point scale.; Sources: "2017 Team Ranking". Rivals.

== Preseason ==
In the conference's preseason poll, the Sycamores were picked to finish in eighth place in the MVC. Senior guard Brenton Scott was named to the preseason All-MVC first team.

== Roster ==
2017–18 Indiana State Sycamores men's basketball team
Players
Coaches

Pos.	#	Name	Height	Weight	Year	Previous school	Hometown
G	1	Demonte Ojinnaka	6 ft 5 in (1.96 m)	212 lb (96 kg)	Sr	Blake HS; Cloud County CC	Silver Spring, MD
G	2	Jordan Barnes	5 ft 11 in (1.8 m)	152 lb (69 kg)	So	Christian Brothers HS	St. Louis, MO
G	3	Trey Knight III	6 ft 4 in (1.93 m)	180 lb (82 kg)	RS So	Cedar Park HS	Cedar Park, TX
G	4	Brenton Scott	6 ft 1 in (1.85 m)	190 lb (86 kg)	RS Sr	Northrop HS	Fort Wayne, IN
F	5	Bronson Kessinger	6 ft 8 in (2.03 m)	222 lb (101 kg)	RS So	Corydon Central HS	Corydon, IN
F	10	Ethan Claycomb (W)	6 ft 7 in (2.01 m)	194 lb (88 kg)	RS Fr	Lincoln HS	Vincennes, IN
G	10	Christian Williams (redshirt)	6 ft 5 in (1.96 m)	200 lb (91 kg)	Jr	St. Teresa HS; Iowa	Decatur, IL
G	11	Tyreke Key	6 ft 2 in (1.88 m)	201 lb (91 kg)	Fr	Clay County HS	Celina, TN
G	13	Clayton Hughes	6 ft 6 in (1.98 m)	206 lb (93 kg)	Fr	University School/Hargrave Military	Jackson, TN
F/C	20	Daniel Huenermann	6 ft 11 in (2.11 m)	221 lb (100 kg)	Fr	Kantonsschule Am Burggraben	St. Gallen, Switzerland
G	24	Matt Deady (W)	6 ft 5 in (1.96 m)	208 lb (94 kg)	RS Fr	South Vigo HS	Terre Haute, IN
G	25	Qiydar Davis	6 ft 5 in (1.96 m)	209 lb (95 kg)	RS Sr	Indian Hills Community College; Flora MacDonald Academy	Atlanta, GA
G	32	Cooper Neese (redshirt)	6 ft 4 in (1.93 m)	190 lb (86 kg)	Fr	Cloverdale HS	Cloverdale, IN
C	34	Brandon Murphy	6 ft 7 in (2.01 m)	270 lb (122 kg)	Sr	Carver HS	Montgomery, AL
F	35	Devin Thomas	6 ft 8 in (2.03 m)	220 lb (100 kg)	Jr	Richmond HS; Mineral Area College	Richmond, IN
C	41	Emondre Richman	6 ft 9 in (2.06 m)	255 lb (116 kg)	Jr	Collinsville HS	Collinsville, IL

Head coach

- Greg Lansing (South Dakota)

Assistant coach(es)

- Marcus Belcher (Southern Illinois)
- Terry Parker (Louisiana Tech)
- Brett Carey (UNC Asheville)

Legend

- (C) Team captain
- (S) Suspended
- (I) Ineligible
- (W) Walk-on
- Injured
- Current redshirt

Roster

== Schedule and results ==
Date time, TV	Rank^{#}	Opponent^{#}	Result	Record	Site (attendance) city, state
Exhibition
Oct 28, 2017*; 3:00 pm		at Purdue	L 72–94		Mackey Arena (5,168); West Lafayette, IN
Nov 3, 2017*; 7:00 pm, ESPN3		Marian	W 84–64		Hulman Center (3,247); Terre Haute, IN
Non-conference regular season
Nov 10 2017*; 7:00 pm, BTN Plus		at Indiana	W 90–69	1–0	Simon Skjodt Assembly Hall (17,222); Bloomington, IN
Nov 16, 2017*; 11:30 am, ESPNU		vs. Auburn; Charleston Classic quarterfinals	L 64–83	1–1	TD Arena (2,136); Charleston, SC
Nov 17, 2017*; 1:30 pm, ESPNU		vs. Old Dominion; Charleston Classic consolation second round	L 44–62	1–2	TD Arena (1,970); Charleston, SC
Nov 19, 2017*; 1:00 pm, ESPN3		vs. Ohio; Charleston Classic 7th place game	L 94–96 ^{4OT}	1–3	TD Arena; Charleston, SC
Nov 22, 2017*; 5:00 pm, ESPN3		Missouri–St. Louis	W 75–58	2–3	Hulman Center (2,612); Terre Haute, IN
Nov 25, 2017*; 1:00 pm, ESPN3		Ball State	L 85–93	2–4	Hulman Center (3,274); Terre Haute, IN
Nov 29, 2017*; 7:00 pm, ESPN3		Air Force; MW–MVC Challenge	W 74–64	3–4	Hulman Center (3,797); Terre Haute, IN
Dec 6, 2017*; 8:00 pm		at North Texas	L 76–79 ^{OT}	3–5	The Super Pit (1,642); Denton, TX
Dec 9, 2017*; 4:00 pm, ESPN3		Indianapolis	W 79–75	4–5	Hulman Center (3,491); Terre Haute, IN
Dec 12, 2017*; 7:00 pm, ESPN3		Green Bay	W 85–63	5–5	Hulman Center (2,924); Terre Haute, IN
Dec 16, 2017*; 3:00 pm		at Western Kentucky	L 65–81	5–6	E. A. Diddle Arena (4,412); Bowling Green, KY
Dec 22, 2017*; 6:00 pm, ESPN3		Elon	L 68–73	5–7	Hulman Center (2,979); Terre Haute, IN
Missouri Valley regular season
Dec 28, 2017; 7:00 pm, NBCSC		Valparaiso	W 73–64	6–7 (1–0)	Hulman Center (3,269); Terre Haute, IN
Dec 31, 2017; 4:00 pm, ESPN3		at Illinois State	L 81–84 ^{OT}	6–8 (1–1)	Redbird Arena (5,824); Normal, IL
Jan 3, 2018; 8:00 pm, NBCSC+		at Loyola–Chicago	W 61–57	7–8 (2–1)	Joseph J. Gentile Arena (1,501); Chicago, IL
Jan 6, 2018; 2:00 pm, ESPN3		Drake	L 72–75	7–9 (2–2)	Hulman Center; Terre Haute, IN
Jan 10, 2018; 7:00 pm, FSI/NBCSC		Northern Iowa	W 69–67	8–9 (3–2)	Hulman Center (3,216); Terre Haute, IN
Jan 14, 2018; 3:00 pm, ESPN3		at Missouri State	L 73–76	8–10 (3–3)	JQH Arena (4,137); Springfield, MO
Jan 17, 2018; 8:00 pm, ESPN3		at Evansville	W 71–66	9–10 (4–3)	Ford Center (3,601); Evansville, IN
Jan 20, 2018; 2:00 pm, ESPN3		Illinois State	W 84–54	10–10 (5–3)	Hulman Center (5,950); Terre Haute, IN
Jan 24, 2018; 8:00 pm, ESPN3		at Southern Illinois	L 77–82	10–11 (5–4)	SIU Arena (3,929); Carbondale, IL
Jan 28, 2018; 2:00 pm, ESPN3		Bradley	L 73–81	10–12 (5–5)	Hulman Center (4,516); Terre Haute, IN
Jan 31, 2018; 8:00 pm, ESPN3		at Valparaiso	L 63–69	10–13 (5–6)	Athletics–Recreation Center (2,228); Valparaiso, IN
Feb 3, 2018; 4:00 pm, FSI/NBCSC		at Northern Iowa	W 77–66	11–13 (6–6)	McLeod Center (4,564); Cedar Falls, IA
Feb 6, 2018; 7:00 pm, FSI/NBCSC		Missouri State	L 62–81	11–14 (6–7)	Hulman Center (4,040); Terre Haute, IN
Feb 10, 2018; 2:00 pm, ESPN3		Loyola–Chicago	L 71–75	11–15 (6–8)	Hulman Center (4,328); Terre Haute, IN
Feb 14, 2018; 8:00 pm, ESPN3		at Drake	L 76–90	11–16 (6–9)	Knapp Center (2,617); Des Moines, IA
Feb 17, 2018; 2:00 pm, ESPN3		Southern Illinois	L 72–76 ^{OT}	11–17 (6–10)	Hulman Center (3,895); Terre Haute, IN
Feb 21, 2018; 7:00 pm, ESPN3		Evansville	W 58–53	12–17 (7–10)	Hulman Center (4,295); Terre Haute, IN
Feb 24, 2018; 4:00 pm, CBSSN		at Bradley	W 66–64	13–17 (8–10)	Carver Arena (7,827); Peoria, IL
Missouri Valley tournament
Mar 2, 2018; 9:30 pm, ESPN3	(6)	vs. (3) Illinois State; Quarterfinals	L 70–77	13–18	Scottrade Center (7,077); St. Louis, MO
*Non-conference game. ^{#}Rankings from AP Poll. (#) Tournament seedings in parentheses. All times are in Eastern Time.
