= 2017–18 Valparaiso Crusaders men's basketball team =

American college basketball season

2017–18 Valparaiso Crusaders men's basketball
- Conference: Missouri Valley Conference
- Record: 15–17 (6–12 MVC)
- Head coach: Matt Lottich (2nd season)
- Assistant coaches: Luke Gore; David Ragland; Emanuel Dildy
- Home arena: Athletics–Recreation Center

2017–18 Missouri Valley Conference men's basketball standings
	Conf.				Overall
Team	W		L	PCT	W		L	PCT
Loyola Chicago †	15	–	3	.833	32	–	6	.842
Southern Illinois	11	–	7	.611	20	–	13	.606
Illinois State	10	–	8	.556	18	–	15	.545
Drake	10	–	8	.556	17	–	17	.500
Bradley	9	–	9	.500	20	–	13	.606
Indiana State	8	–	10	.444	13	–	18	.419
Missouri State	7	–	11	.389	18	–	15	.545
Evansville	7	–	11	.389	17	–	15	.531
Northern Iowa	7	–	11	.389	16	–	16	.500
Valparaiso	6	–	12	.333	15	–	17	.469
† 2018 MVC tournament winner

The 2017–18 Valparaiso Crusaders men's basketball team represented Valparaiso University during the 2017–18 NCAA Division I men's basketball season. The Crusaders, led by second-year head coach Matt Lottich, played their home games at the Athletics–Recreation Center as first-year members of the Missouri Valley Conference. They finished the season 15–17, 6–12 in MVC play to finish in last place. They lost in the first round of the Missouri Valley tournament to Missouri State.

== Previous season ==
The Crusaders finished the 2016–17 season 24–9, 14–4 in Horizon League play to finish in a tie for the Horizon League regular season championship. As the No. 2 seed in the Horizon League tournament, they lost to Milwaukee in the quarterfinals. They received an invitation to the National Invitation Tournament where they lost in the first round to Illinois.

The season marked the Crusaders' final season as a member of the Horizon League as the school announced on May 25, 2017, that it would be joining the Missouri Valley Conference effective July 1, 2017.

== Offseason ==
=== 2017 recruiting class ===
College recruiting
Name	Hometown	School	Height	Weight	Commit date
Parker Hazen; SF	Columbia City, Indiana	Columbia City High School	6 ft 7 in (2.01 m)	188 lb (85 kg)	
Parker Hazen; SF	Recruit ratings: Scout: Rivals: 247Sports: (78)				
Marten Linssen; PF	Düsseldorf, Germany	Bayer Giants Leverkusen	6 ft 8 in (2.03 m)	240 lb (110 kg)	
Marten Linssen; PF	Recruit ratings: Scout: Rivals: 247Sports: (NR)				
Mileek McMillan; PF	Merrillville, IN	Merrillville High School	6 ft 8 in (2.03 m)	220 lb (100 kg)	
Mileek McMillan; PF	Recruit ratings: Scout: Rivals: 247Sports: (NR)				
Overall recruit ranking:
Note: In many cases, Scout, Rivals, 247Sports, On3, and ESPN may conflict in their listings of height and weight.; In these cases, the average was taken. ESPN grades are on a 100-point scale.; Sources:

== Preseason ==
In the conference's preseason poll, the Crusaders were picked to finish in sixth place in the MVC. Senior guard Tevonn Walker was named to the preseason All-MVC second team.

== Roster ==
2017–18 Valparaiso Crusaders men's basketball team
Players
Coaches

Pos.	#	Name	Height	Weight	Year	Previous school	Hometown
F	0	Parker Hazen	6 ft 7 in (2.01 m)	210 lb (95 kg)	Fr	Columbia City HS	Columbia City, IN
G	1	Micah Bradford	6 ft 2 in (1.88 m)	155 lb (70 kg)	So	Bradley–Bourbonnais HS	Bradley, IL
G	2	Tevonn Walker	6 ft 2 in (1.88 m)	210 lb (95 kg)	Sr	Vanier College	Montreal, Canada
G	3	Max Joseph	6 ft 1 in (1.85 m)	210 lb (95 kg)	Sr	Vanier College	Montreal, Canada
G	4	Bakari Evelyn	6 ft 2 in (1.88 m)	180 lb (82 kg)	RS So	Southfield Christian School/Nebraska	Detroit, MI
G/F	5	Marcus Golder	6 ft 6 in (1.98 m)	195 lb (88 kg)	RS So	Clackamas HS/North Idaho College	Portland, OR
G/F	10	Joe Burton	6 ft 8 in (2.03 m)	210 lb (95 kg)	RS Jr	Atascosita HS/Oklahoma State	Porter, TX
F	12	Martin Linssen	6 ft 8 in (2.03 m)	240 lb (109 kg)	Fr	Schloss-Gymnasium Benrath	Dusseldorf, Germany
C	14	Jaume Sorolla	7 ft 0 in (2.13 m)	245 lb (111 kg)	So	Sunrise Christian Academy (KS)	Tortosa, Spain
C	21	Derrik Smits	7 ft 2 in (2.18 m)	240 lb (109 kg)	RS So	Zionsville HS	Zionsville, IN
F	23	Mileek McMillan	6 ft 8 in (2.03 m)	220 lb (100 kg)	Fr	Merrillville HS	Merrillville, IN
G/F	33	John Kiser	6 ft 5 in (1.96 m)	205 lb (93 kg)	So	Noblesville HS	Noblesville, IN
G/F	35	Ryan Fazekas	6 ft 8 in (2.03 m)	225 lb (102 kg)	Jr	Marquette Catholic HS/Providence	Chesterton, IN

Head coach

- Matt Lottich (Stanford)

Assistant coach(es)

- Luke Gore (Bethel (TN))
- David Ragland (Southern Indiana)
- Emanuel Dildy (Eastern Illinois)

Legend

- (C) Team captain
- (S) Suspended
- (I) Ineligible
- (W) Walk-on
- Injured
- Current redshirt

Roster

== Schedule and results ==
Date time, TV	Rank^{#}	Opponent^{#}	Result	Record	High points	High rebounds	High assists	Site (attendance) city, state
Exhibition
Nov 2, 2017*; 7:00 pm, ESPN3		Robert Morris (IL)	W 117–69		17 – Bradford	10 – Hazen	6 – Joseph	Athletics–Recreation Center (2,134); Valparaiso, IN
Nov 2, 2017*; 7:00 pm		at Chicago State	W 77–42		–	–	–	Jones Convocation Center; Chicago, IL
Non-conference regular season
Nov 10, 2017*; 7:00 pm, ESPN3		North Park	W 88–46	1–0	20 – Bradford	10 – Golder	3 – Walker	Athletics–Recreation Center (2,682); Valparaiso, IN
Nov 13, 2017*; 7:00 pm, ESPN3		Trinity Christian	W 83–46	2–0	18 – Walker	9 – Kiser	4 – Evelyn	Athletics–Recreation Center (2,545); Valparaiso, IN
Nov 15, 2017*; 7:00 pm, FSMW		at SIU Edwardsville	W 94–69	3–0	22 – Walker	5 – Golder	7 – Evelyn	Vadalabene Center (1,353); Edwardsville, IL
Nov 19, 2017*; 3:00 pm, ESPN3		Southeastern Louisiana; Savannah Invitational	W 83–50	4–0	18 – Burton	6 – Smits	4 – Evelyn	Athletics–Recreation Center (2,651); Valparaiso, IN
Nov 21, 2017*; 7:00 pm, ESPN3		Samford; Savannah Invitational	W 88–67	5–0	26 – Walker	9 – Walker	6 – Joseph	Athletics–Recreation Center (2,259); Valparaiso, IN
Nov 24, 2017*; 6:30 pm		vs. Kent State; Savannah Invitational	W 77–67	6–0	17 – Walker	7 – Linssen	7 – Evelyn	Savannah Civic Center; Savannah, GA
Nov 25, 2017*; 6:30 pm		vs. UNC Wilmington; Savannah Invitational	W 79–70	7–0	30 – Evelyn	8 – Tied	1 – 3 tied	Savannah Civic Center (547); Savannah, GA
Nov 28, 2017*; 7:00 pm		Utah State; MW–MVC Challenge	W 72–65	8–0	25 – Walker	9 – Walker	4 – Evelyn	Athletics–Recreation Center (2,949); Valparaiso, IN
Dec 7, 2017*; 5:30 pm, FS1		at No. 21 Purdue	L 50–80	8–1	19 – Burton	10 – Sorolla	2 – Bradford	Mackey Arena (14,232); West Lafayette, IN
Dec 9, 2017*; 1:00 pm, ESPN3		at Ball State	L 70–71	8–2	17 – Burton	11 – Joseph	6 – Evelyn	Worthen Arena (5,009); Muncie, IN
Dec 14, 2017*; 7:00 pm, BTN		at Northwestern	L 50–84	8–3	16 – Burton	6 – Tied	3 – Bradford	Allstate Arena (5,299); Rosemont, IL
Dec 18, 2017*; 9:00 pm		at Santa Clara	W 76–68	9–3	14 – Burton	6 – Kiser	4 – 4 tied	Leavey Center (1,305); Santa Clara, CA
Dec 20, 2017*; 9:00 pm		at UC Riverside	L 60–73	9–4	15 – Joseph	7 – Smits	3 – Tied	SRC Center (454); Riverside, CA
MVC regular season
Dec 28, 2017; 6:00 pm, NBCSC		at Indiana State	L 64–73	9–5 (0–1)	19 – Tied	7 – Joseph	2 – Linssen	Hulman Center (3,269); Terre Haute, IN
Dec 31, 2017; 3:00 pm, ESPN3		Missouri State	L 50–67	9–6 (0–2)	13 – Joseph	5 – Joseph	4 – Walker	Athletics–Recreation Center (2,440); Valparaiso, IN
Jan 3, 2018; 7:00 pm, ESPN3		at Bradley	L 71–80	9–7 (0–3)	25 – Walker	7 – Walker	3 – Tied	Carver Arena (5,294); Peoria, IL
Jan 6, 2018; 3:00 pm, NBCSC		Southern Illinois	W 83–72	10–7 (1–3)	17 – Tied	8 – Walker	6 – Bradford	Athletics–Recreation Center (2,966); Valparaiso, IN
Jan 10, 2018; 7:00 pm, ESPN3		at Drake	W 77–60	11–7 (2–3)	26 – Walker	6 – Walker	8 – Joseph	Knapp Center (2,710); Des Moines, IA
Jan 13, 2018; 7:00 pm, ESPN2		at Northern Iowa	L 76–81	11–8 (2–4)	19 – Evelyn	6 – Golder	9 – Bradford	McLeod Center (4,707); Cedar Falls, IA
Jan 17, 2018; 7:00 pm, ESPN3		at Missouri State	L 57–64	11–9 (2–5)	12 – Golder	7 – Joseph	3 – Bradford	JQH Arena (4,876); Springfield, MO
Jan 21, 2018; 3:00 pm, ESPNU		Loyola–Chicago	L 54–70	11–10 (2–6)	19 – Evelyn	6 – Tied	2 – Evelyn	Athletics–Recreation Center (4,040); Valparaiso, IN
Jan 24, 2018; 7:00 pm, ESPN3		Evansville	L 65–75	11–11 (2–7)	17 – Evelyn	6 – 3 tied	4 – Evelyn	Athletics–Recreation Center (2,219); Valparaiso, IN
Jan 27, 2018; 9:00 pm, ESPN2		at Illinois State	L 65–76	11–12 (2–8)	20 – Evelyn	7 – Kiser	4 – Evelyn	Redbird Arena (5,024); Bloomington, IL
Jan 31, 2018; 7:00 pm, ESPN3		Indiana State	W 69–63	12–12 (3–8)	20 – Evelyn	6 – Smits	2 – 3 tied	Athletics–Recreation Center (2,228); Valparaiso, IN
Feb 3, 2018; 7:00 pm, ESPN3		at Southern Illinois	L 59-65	12–13 (3–9)	16 – Walker	9 – Evelyn	5 – Golder	SIU Arena (5,694); Carbondale, IL
Feb 7, 2018; 7:00 pm, ESPN3		at Evansville	L 59-63	12–14 (3–10)	15 – Tied	6 – Kiser	4 – Evelyn	Ford Center (3,425); Evansville, IN
Feb 11, 2018; 3:00 pm, ESPNU		Illinois State	W 74–58	13–14 (4–10)	22 – Evelyn	9 – Kiser	5 – Tied	Athletics–Recreation Center (3,330); Valparaiso, IN
Feb 14, 2018; 7:00 pm, ESPN3		at Loyola–Chicago	L 71–80	13–15 (4–11)	18 – Walker	8 – Kiser	5 – Walker	Joseph J. Gentile Arena (2,091); Chicago, IL
Feb 17, 2018; 8:00 pm, NBCSC		Bradley	W 77–64	14–15 (5–11)	16 – Golder	7 – Golder	6 – Joseph	Athletics–Recreation Center (3,021); Valparaiso, IN
Feb 20, 2018; 8:00 pm, CBSSN		Northern Iowa	L 63–68	14–16 (5–12)	19 – Evelyn	5 – Golder	3 – Golder	Athletics–Recreation Center (2,071); Valparaiso, IN
Feb 24, 2018; 7:00 pm, ESPN3		Drake	W 69–64	15–16 (6–12)	22 – Smits	9 – Tied	4 – Evelyn	Athletics–Recreation Center (4,025); Valparaiso, IN
MVC tournament
Mar 1, 2018; 8:30 pm, ESPN3	(10)	vs. (7) Missouri State; First round	L 79–83	15–17	25 – Walker	6 – Evelyn	5 – Bradford	Scottrade Center (4,852); St. Louis, MO
*Non-conference game. ^{#}Rankings from AP Poll. (#) Tournament seedings in parentheses. All times are in Central Time.
