= 2017–18 Southern Illinois Salukis men's basketball team =

American college basketball season

2017–18 Southern Illinois Salukis men's basketball
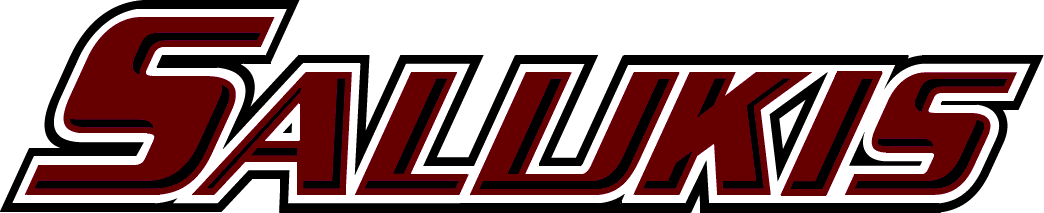
- Conference: Missouri Valley Conference
- Record: 20–13 (11–7 MVC)
- Head coach: Barry Hinson (6th season)
- Assistant coaches: Brad Autry; Anthony Beane Sr.; Justin Walker
- Home arena: SIU Arena

2017–18 Missouri Valley Conference men's basketball standings
	Conf.				Overall
Team	W		L	PCT	W		L	PCT
Loyola Chicago †	15	–	3	.833	32	–	6	.842
Southern Illinois	11	–	7	.611	20	–	13	.606
Illinois State	10	–	8	.556	18	–	15	.545
Drake	10	–	8	.556	17	–	17	.500
Bradley	9	–	9	.500	20	–	13	.606
Indiana State	8	–	10	.444	13	–	18	.419
Missouri State	7	–	11	.389	18	–	15	.545
Evansville	7	–	11	.389	17	–	15	.531
Northern Iowa	7	–	11	.389	16	–	16	.500
Valparaiso	6	–	12	.333	15	–	17	.469
† 2018 MVC tournament winner

The 2017–18 Southern Illinois Salukis men's basketball team represented Southern Illinois University Carbondale during the 2017–18 NCAA Division I men's basketball season. The Salukis, led by sixth-year head coach Barry Hinson, played their home games at the SIU Arena in Carbondale, Illinois as members of the Missouri Valley Conference (MVC). They finished the season 20–13, 11–7 in MVC play, to finish in second place. In the MVC tournament, they defeated Missouri State in the quarterfinals before losing to Illinois State in the semifinals. Despite winning 20 games, the Salukis did not participate in a postseason tournament.

== Previous season ==
The Salukis finished the 2016–17 season 17–16, 9–9 in MVC play, to finish in a tie for third place. In the MVC tournament, they defeated Loyola–Chicago in the quarterfinals before losing to Illinois State in the semifinals.

== Offseason ==
=== Departures ===
Name	Number	Pos.	Height	Weight	Year	Hometown	Reason for departure
Mike Rodriguez	1	G	5'10"	165	Senior	Boston, MA	Graduated
Leo Vincent	5	G	6'1"	185	Senior	Bensalem, PA	Graduated
Sean O'Brien	33	F	6'7"	215	Senior	Mundelein, IL	Graduated

=== Incoming transfers ===
Name	Number	Pos.	Height	Weight	Year	Hometown	Previous school
Eric McGill	2	G	6'2"	170	Junior	Memphis, TN	Junior college transferred from Panola College
Kavion Pippen	33	F	6'10"	220	Junior	Hamburg, AR	Junior college transferred form Three Rivers College

=== 2017 recruiting class ===
Southern Illinois did not have any incoming players in the 2017 recruiting class.

== Preseason ==
In the conference's preseason poll, the Salukis were picked to finish in fifth place in the MVC. Senior forward Thik Bol was named to the preseason All-MVC second team.

== Roster ==
2017–18 Southern Illinois Salukis men's basketball team
Players
Coaches

Pos.	#	Name	Height	Weight	Year	Previous school	Hometown
G	0	Jonathan Wiley	6 ft 7 in (2.01 m)	201 lb (91 kg)	Sr	Panola College; St. Pius	Houston, TX
G	3	Marcus Bartley	6 ft 5 in (1.96 m)	193 lb (88 kg)	RS Jr	Saint Louis; Douglas MacArthur	Decatur, IL
G	4	Eric McGill	6 ft 2 in (1.88 m)	175 lb (79 kg)	Jr	Panola College; Bartlett	Memphis, TN
G	10	Aaron Jr. Cook	6 ft 2 in (1.88 m)	185 lb (84 kg)	So	Westminster Christian	St. Louis, MO
G	11	Tyler Smithpeters	6 ft 4 in (1.93 m)	203 lb (92 kg)	RS Sr	Harrisburg	Harrisburg, IL
G	13	Sean Lloyd	6 ft 5 in (1.96 m)	210 lb (95 kg)	Jr	Mt. Zion Prep	Philadelphia, PA
F	15	Austin Weiher	6 ft 8 in (2.03 m)	206 lb (93 kg)	RS Jr	Creating Young Minds Academy	Kent, WA
G	22	Armon Fletcher	6 ft 5 in (1.96 m)	207 lb (94 kg)	RS Jr	Edwardsville	Edwardsville, IL
F	24	Rudy Stradnieks	6 ft 9 in (2.06 m)	229 lb (104 kg)	Jr	Lee Academy	Riga, Latvia
G	25	Brendon Gooch	6 ft 5 in (1.96 m)	204 lb (93 kg)	So	Althoff	Belleville, IL
C	33	Kavion Pippen	6 ft 10 in (2.08 m)	240 lb (109 kg)	Jr	Hamburg; Three Rivers College	Hamburg, AR
F	40	Thik Bol	6 ft 8 in (2.03 m)	202 lb (92 kg)	Sr	Benson; Iowa Western CC	Omaha, NE

Head coach

- Barry Hinson (Oklahoma State)

Assistant coach(es)

- Anthony Beane Sr. (Kansas State)
- Brad Autry (Northwestern Oklahoma State)
- Justin Walker (Eastern Illinois)

Legend

- (C) Team captain
- (S) Suspended
- (I) Ineligible
- (W) Walk-on
- Injured
- Current redshirt

Roster
Last update: July 26, 2024

== Schedule and results ==
Date time, TV	Rank^{#}	Opponent^{#}	Result	Record	Site (attendance) city, state
Exhibition
November 4, 2017*; 7:00 p.m.		Rockhurst	W 98–68		SIU Arena (4,055); Carbondale, IL
Non-conference regular season
November 10, 2017*; 6:00 p.m., BSN		at Winthrop	W 81–66	1–0	Winthrop Coliseum (2,675); Rock Hill, SC
November 18, 2017*; 7:00 p.m., ESPN3		Illinois–Springfield	W 69–64	2–0	SIU Arena (4,166); Carbondale, IL
November 21, 2017*; 6:00 p.m., RSN		at No. 19 Louisville	L 42–84	2–1	KFC Yum! Center (18,046); Louisville, KY
November 25, 2017*; 7:00 p.m., 3,052		at Murray State	L 73–81	2–2	CFSB Center (3,062); Murray, KY
November 29, 2017*; 7:00 p.m., ESPN3		SIU Edwardsville	W 86–59	3–2	SIU Arena (3,333); Carbondale, IL
December 2, 2017*; 3:00 p.m., ESPN3		San Jose State; MW–MVC Challenge	W 76–58	4–2	SIU Arena (4,026); Carbondale, IL
December 6, 2017*; 7:00 p.m., FSMW		at Saint Louis	L 69–74	4–3	Chaifetz Arena (5,633); St. Louis, MO
December 9, 2017*; 7:00 p.m., ESPN3		Southeast Missouri State	L 69–75	4–4	SIU Arena (4,493); Carbondale, IL
December 13, 2017*; 7:00 p.m., ESPN3		Jackson State	W 69–51	5–4	SIU Arena (2,151); Carbondale, IL
December 17, 2017*; 3:00 p.m., ESPN3		Lamar; Las Vegas Classic campus game	W 71–61	6–4	SIU Arena (2,136); Carbondale, IL
December 19, 2017*; 7:00 p.m., ESPN3		North Carolina A&T; Las Vegas Classic campus game	W 102–64	7–4	SIU Arena (3,058); Carbondale, IL
December 22, 2017*; 10:00 p.m., FS1		vs. Nevada; Las Vegas Classic	L 64–86	7–5	Orleans Arena; Paradise, NV
December 23, 2017*; 7:30 p.m., FS1		vs. Duquesne; Las Vegas Classic	W 74–64	8–5	Orleans Arena; Paradise, NV
Missouri Valley regular season
December 28, 2017; 7:00 p.m., ESPN3		at Northern Iowa	L 56–63	9–5 (1–0)	McLeod Center (4,933); Cedar Falls, IA
December 31, 2017; 3:00 p.m., ESPN3		Drake	L 67–70	9–6 (1–1)	SIU Arena (4,230); Carbondale, IL
January 3, 2018; 7:00 p.m., ESPN3		Evansville	W 65–63	10–6 (2–1)	SIU Arena (4,622); Carbondale, IL
January 6, 2018; 3:00 p.m., ESPN3		at Valparaiso	L 72–83	10–7 (2–2)	Athletics–Recreation Center (2,966); Valparaiso, IN
January 9, 2018; 7:00 p.m., ESPN3		at Bradley	L 62–68	10–8 (2–3)	Carver Arena (5,319); Peoria, IL
January 13, 2018; 5:00 p.m., CBSSN		Illinois State	W 74–70	11–8 (3–3)	SIU Arena (3,227); Carbondale, IL
January 17, 2018; 7:00 p.m., ESPN3		at Loyola–Chicago	L 65–79	11–9 (3–4)	Joseph J. Gentile Arena (2,439); Chicago, IL
January 21, 2018; 3:00 p.m., ESPN3		Northern Iowa	W 64–53	12–9 (4–4)	SIU Arena (3,254); Carbondale, IL
January 24, 2018; 7:00 p.m., ESPN3		Indiana State	W 82–77	13–9 (5–4)	SIU Arena (3,929); Carbondale, IL
January 27, 2018; 5:00 p.m., ESPNU		at Missouri State	W 79–77	14–9 (6–4)	JQH Arena (6,724); Springfield, MO
January 30, 2018; 7:00 p.m.		at Drake	W 78–67	15–9 (7–4)	Knapp Center (3,198); Des Moines, IA
February 3, 2018; 7:00 p.m., ESPN3		Valparaiso	W 65–59	16–9 (8–4)	SIU Arena (5,694); Carbondale, IL
February 8, 2018; 8:00 p.m., CBSSN		at Illinois State	L 68–76 ^{OT}	16–10 (8–5)	Redbird Arena (4,948); Normal, IL
February 11, 2018; 3:00 p.m., ESPN3		Bradley	W 74–57	17–10 (9–5)	SIU Arena (4,830); Carbondale, IL
February 14, 2018; 7:00 p.m., ESPN3		Missouri State	W 81–80 ^{OT}	18–10 (10–5)	SIU Arena (4,285); Carbondale, IL
February 17, 2018; 1:00 p.m., ESPN3		at Indiana State	W 76–72 ^{OT}	19–10 (11–5)	Hulman Center (3,895); Terre Haute, IN
February 21, 2018; 7:00 p.m., ESPN3		Loyola–Chicago	L 56–75	19–11 (11–6)	SIU Arena (6,036); Carbondale, IL
February 24, 2018; 1:00 p.m., ESPN3		at Evansville	L 44–75	19–12 (11–7)	Ford Center (4,312); Evansville, IN
Missouri Valley tournament
March 2, 2018; 6:00 p.m., ESPN3	(2)	vs. (7) Missouri State; Quarterfinals	W 67–63	20–12	Scottrade Center (7,077); St. Louis, MO
March 3, 2018; 5:05 p.m., CBSSN	(2)	vs. (3) Illinois State; Semifinals	L 68–76 ^{OT}	20–13	Scottrade Center (8,415); St. Louis, MO
*Non-conference game. ^{#}Rankings from AP poll. (#) Tournament seedings in parentheses. All times are in Central.
