= 2017–18 Illinois State Redbirds men's basketball team =

American college basketball season

2017–18 Illinois State Redbirds men's basketball
- Conference: Missouri Valley Conference
- Record: 18–15 (10–8 MVC)
- Head coach: Dan Muller (6th season)
- Assistant coaches: Brian Reese; Brian Collins; Brendan Mullins
- Home arena: Doug Collins Court at Redbird Arena

2017–18 Missouri Valley Conference men's basketball standings
	Conf.				Overall
Team	W		L	PCT	W		L	PCT
Loyola Chicago †	15	–	3	.833	32	–	6	.842
Southern Illinois	11	–	7	.611	20	–	13	.606
Illinois State	10	–	8	.556	18	–	15	.545
Drake	10	–	8	.556	17	–	17	.500
Bradley	9	–	9	.500	20	–	13	.606
Indiana State	8	–	10	.444	13	–	18	.419
Missouri State	7	–	11	.389	18	–	15	.545
Evansville	7	–	11	.389	17	–	15	.531
Northern Iowa	7	–	11	.389	16	–	16	.500
Valparaiso	6	–	12	.333	15	–	17	.469
† 2018 MVC tournament winner

The 2017–18 Illinois State Redbirds men's basketball team represented Illinois State University during the 2017–18 NCAA Division I men's basketball season. The Redbirds, led by sixth-year head coach Dan Muller, played their home games at Redbird Arena in Normal, Illinois as a member of the Missouri Valley Conference. They finished the season 18–15, 10–8 in conference play, to finish in a tie for the third place. As the number three seed in the MVC tournament, they defeated Missouri State in their quarterfinal game and Southern Illinois in their semifinal game before being beaten by Loyola–Chicago in the final.

== Previous season ==
The Redbrids finished the 2016–17 NCAA Division I men's basketball season 28–7, 17–1 in conference play, to finish in a tie for first place. As the number one seed in the MVC tournament, they defeated Evansville in their quarterfinal game and Southern Illinois in their semifinal game before being beaten by Wichita State in the final.

Although not winning the conference tournament, the Redbirds held the tie-breaker for the regular season title and, as a result, received an automatic bid to the National Invitation Tournament. They were awarded a number one seed where they defeated California–Irvine in their first-round game before losing to Central Florida in their second-round game.

== Offseason ==
=== Departures ===
Name	#	Pos.	Height	Weight	Year	Hometown	Comment
Javaka Thompson	31	G	6'4"	191	RS Sr	Chicago, IL	Graduation
Paris Lee	1	G	6'0"	185	Sr	Maywood, IL	Graduation
Tony Willis	12	G	6'4"	185	Sr	Indianapolis, IN	Graduation
Deontae Hawkins	23	F	6'8"	220	RS Jr	Dayton, OH	Graduation; (graduate transfer Boston College)
MiKyle McIntosh	11	F	6'7"	234	RS Jr	Pickering, ON	Graduation; (graduate transfer Oregon)
Andre Washington	15	F	6'8"	195	Fr	Fort Worth, TX	Hill College

=== Arrivals ===
==== Transfers ====
Name	Pos.	Height	Weight	Year	Hometown	Prior School
Jerron Martin	G	6'0"	175	RS Sr	Prince George's County, MD	Texas Southern
Zach Copeland	G	6'4"	175	Jr	Oakland, CA	City College of San Francisco
William Tinsley	G	6'6"	195	Jr	Colfax, IL	Lake Land College
Matt Chastain	G/F	6'6"	190	RS Fr	Le Roy, IL	Loyola–Chicago

==== Recruiting class ====
College recruiting information
Name	Hometown	School	Height	Weight	Commit date
Taylor Bruninga; PF	Glasford, IL	Illini Bluffs High School	6 ft 8 in (2.03 m)	200 lb (91 kg)	
Taylor Bruninga; PF	Recruit ratings: Scout: Rivals: 247Sports: (N/A)				
Elijah Clarance; PG	Malmö, Sweden	St. Maria Goretti High School	6 ft 4 in (1.93 m)	190 lb (86 kg)	
Elijah Clarance; PG	Recruit ratings: Scout: Rivals: 247Sports: (65)				
Overall recruit ranking:
Note: In many cases, Scout, Rivals, 247Sports, On3, and ESPN may conflict in their listings of height and weight.; In these cases, the average was taken. ESPN grades are on a 100-point scale.; Sources: "2017 Team Ranking". Rivals.

== Preseason ==
In the conference's preseason poll, the Redbirds were picked to finish in fourth place in the MVC. Junior forward Phil Fayne was named to the preseason All-MVC second team.

== Roster ==
2017–18 Illinois State Redbirds men's basketball team
Players
Coaches

Pos.	#	Name	Height	Weight	Year	Previous school	Hometown
G	0	Isaac Gassman	6 ft 5 in (1.96 m)	180 lb (82 kg)	RS Fr	Ottawa Township High School	Utica, IL
G	1	Elijah Clarence	6 ft 4 in (1.93 m)	190 lb (86 kg)	Fr	St. Maria Goretti High School	Malmö, Sweden
G	2	Zach Copeland	6 ft 4 in (1.93 m)	185 lb (84 kg)	Jr	Berkeley High School; City College of San Francisco	Oakland, CA
G	3	Keyshawn Evans	6 ft 0 in (1.83 m)	180 lb (82 kg)	Jr	Sagemont School	Plantation, FL
C	4	Daouda Ndaiye	7 ft 0 in (2.13 m)	215 lb (98 kg)	Jr	Windermere Preparatory School	Dakar, Senegal
G	5	Matt Hein	6 ft 3 in (1.91 m)	185 lb (84 kg)	RS So	Windermere Preparatory School	Windermere, FL
F	10	Phil Fayne	6 ft 9 in (2.06 m)	200 lb (91 kg)	Jr	Franklin High School; Western Nebraska Community College	Elk Grove, CA
G	22	Matt Chastain (W, I)	6 ft 6 in (1.98 m)	190 lb (86 kg)	RS Fr	Le Roy High School; Loyola–Chicago	Le Roy, IL
G	23	William Tinsley	6 ft 6 in (1.98 m)	195 lb (88 kg)	Jr	Ridgeview High School	Colfax, IL
G	24	Jerron Martin	6 ft 0 in (1.83 m)	175 lb (79 kg)	RS Sr	Princeton Day School; Texas Southern	Prince George's County, MD
G	25	Madison Williams	6 ft 3 in (1.91 m)	170 lb (77 kg)	So	Academy of Richmond County	Augusta, GA
F	32	Taylor Bruninga	6 ft 8 in (2.03 m)	200 lb (91 kg)	Fr	Illini Bluffs High School	Mapleton, IL
F	34	Christian Romine (injured)	6 ft 9 in (2.06 m)	220 lb (100 kg)	RS So	Mahomet–Seymour High School; Texas–El Paso	Mahomet, IL
F	52	Milik Yarbrough	6 ft 6 in (1.98 m)	230 lb (104 kg)	RS Jr	Zion–Benton Township High School; Saint Louis	Zion, IL

Head coach

- Dan Muller (Illinois State)

Assistant coach(es)

- Brian Reese (North Carolina)
- Brian Collins (Belmont)
- Brendan Mullins (Saint Michael's)

Legend

- (C) Team captain
- (S) Suspended
- (I) Ineligible
- (W) Walk-on
- Injured
- Current redshirt

Roster
Last update: March 5, 2018

== Schedule and results ==
Date time, TV	Rank^{#}	Opponent^{#}	Result	Record	High points	High rebounds	High assists	Site (attendance) city, state
Exhibition Season
November 5, 2017*; 2:00 pm, ESPN3		Lewis	W 79–52		25 – Yarbrough	8 – Yarbrough, Bruninga	4 – Evans	Doug Collins Court at Redbird Arena (4,066); Normal, IL
Non-Conference Regular Season
November 11, 2017*; 12:00 pm, ESPN3		at Florida Gulf Coast	L 87–98	0–1	28 – Evans	8 – Yarbrough	10 – Yarbrough	Alico Arena (4,335); Fort Myers, FL
November 16, 2017*; 10:30 am, ESPN2		vs. South Carolina; Puerto Rico Tip–Off [Quarterfinal]	W 69–65	1–1	18 – Yarbrough	10 – Fayne	6 – Yarbrough	HTC Center (700); Conway, SC
November 17, 2017*; 12:00 pm, ESPN2		vs. Boise State; Puerto Rico Tip–Off [Semifinal]	L 64–82	1–2	21 – Evans	6 – Fayne	4 – Evans	HTC Center (875); Conway, SC
November 19, 2017*; 4:00 pm, ESPNU		vs. Tulsa; Puerto Rico Tip–Off [Third Place]	W 84–68	2–2	29 – Evans	8 – Yarbrough	5 – Yarbrough, Evans	HTC Center (2,119); Conway, SC
November 22, 2017*; 8:00 pm, ESPN3		Quincy	W 86–57	3–2	19 – Fayne	10 – Tinsley	6 – Evans	Doug Collins Court at Redbird Arena (3,733); Normal, IL
November 25, 2017*; 8:00 pm, ESPN3		Charleston Southern	L 62–64 ^{OT}	3–3	26 – Evans	13 – Fayne	2 – Yarbrough, Fayne	Doug Collins Court at Redbird Arena (3,831); Normal, IL
November 29, 2017*; 9:00 pm, Stadium		at Nevada; Mountain West– Missouri Valley Challenge	L 68–98	3–4	15 – Fayne	7 – Tinsley	4 – Evans	Lawlor Events Center (8,293); Reno, NV
December 2, 2017*; 3:00 pm, NBCSCH+		Tulsa	W 65–58	4–4	22 – Yarbrough	8 – Fayne	5 – Evans	Doug Collins Court at Redbird Arena (5,803); Normal, IL
December 6, 2017*; 8:00 pm, BYUtv		at BYU	L 68–80	4–5	20 – Bruninga	9 – Yarbrough	6 – Evans	Marriott Center (12,250); Provo, UT
December 9, 2017*; 3:00 pm, NBCSCH+		Murray State	L 72–78	4–6	30 – Yarbrough	7 – Yarbrough	3 – Yarbrough, Evans	Doug Collins Court at Redbird Arena (5,150); Normal, IL
December 16, 2017*; 2:30 pm, SECN		at Ole Miss	W 101–97 ^{OT}	5–6	25 – Yarbrough, Evans	10 – Yarbrough, Fayne	8 – Yarbrough	The Pavilion at Ole Miss (6,309); Oxford, MS
December 19, 2017*; 7:00 pm, NBCSCH		UIC	W 71–70	6–6	20 – Yarbrough	10 – Tinsley	5 – Yarbrough	Doug Collins Court at Redbird Arena (4,062); Normal, IL
Missouri Valley Conference Regular Season
December 23, 2017; 1:00 pm, MVC Network (FSIN/FSKC/FSMW/NBCSCH)		at Evansville	W 72–66	7–6 (1–0)	28 – Yarbrough	7 – Fayne	3 – Yarbrough, Hein	Ford Center (4,039); Evansville, IN
December 31, 2017; 3:00 pm, ESPN3		Indiana State	W 84–81 ^{OT}	8–6 (2–0)	29 – Yarbrough	11 – Fayne	4 – Yarbrough	Doug Collins Court at Redbird Arena (5,824); Normal, IL
January 3, 2018; 7:00 pm, ESPN3		at Drake	L 62–87	8–7 (2–1)	13 – Evans	7 – Nidaye	7 – Yarbrough	The Knapp Center (3,113); Des Moines, IA
January 7, 2018; 1:00 pm, CBSSN		Missouri State	W 72–68	9–7 (3–1)	23 – Yarbrough, Fayne	6 – Fayne	4 – Yarbrough, Evans	Doug Collins Court at Redbird Arena (4,344); Normal, IL
January 10, 2018; 7:00 pm, ESPN3		Loyola–Chicago	L 61–68	9–8 (3–2)	14 – Fayne	4 – Yarbrough, Tinsley	8 – Yarbrough	Doug Collins Court at Redbird Arena (4,466); Normal, IL
January 13, 2018; 5:00 pm, CBSSN		Southern Illinois	L 70–74	9–9 (3–3)	24 – Fayne	10 – Fayne	5 – Yarbrough	SIU Arena (3,227); Carbondale, IL
January 17, 2018; 6:00 pm, MVC Network		Bradley; I–74 Rivalry	W 70–57	10–9 (4–3)	20 – Yarbrough	12 – Ndiaye	3 – Yarbrough, Evans, Hein	Doug Collins Court at Redbird Arena (6,321); Normal, IL
January 20, 2018; 1:00 pm, ESPN3		at Indiana State	L 54–84	10–10 (4–4)	13 – Fayne	9 – Fayne	2 – Evans	Hulman Center (5,148); Terre Haute, IN
January 24, 2018; 7:00 pm, ESPN3		at Northern Iowa	L 72–83	10–11 (4–5)	25 – Evans	13 – Yarbrough	5 – Yarbrough	McLeod Center (3,762); Cedar Falls, IA
January 27, 2018; 9:00 pm, ESPN2		Valparaiso	W 76–65	11–11 (5–5)	24 – Fayne	9 – Fayne	7 – Yarbrough	Doug Collins Court at Redbird Arena (5,024); Normal, IL
January 30, 2018; 7:00 pm, ESPN3		at Missouri State	W 76–60	12–11 (6–5)	15 – Yarbrough, Evans	10 – Ndiaye	6 – Yarbrough	JQH Arena (4,545); Springfield, MO
February 3, 2018; 3:00 pm, ESPN3		Evansville	W 75–71	13–11 (7–5)	13 – Yarbrough, Fayne, Hein	10 – Fayne	5 – Yarbrough	Doug Collins Court at Redbird Arena (6,923); Normal, IL
February 8, 2018; 8:00 pm, CBSSN		Southern Illinois	W 76–68 ^{OT}	14–11 (8–5)	15 – Clarance	9 – Yarbrough	5 – Yarbrough	Doug Collins Court at Redbird Arena (4,948); Normal, IL
February 11, 2018; 3:00 pm, ESPNU		at Valparaiso	L 58–74	14–12 (8–6)	13 – Tinsley	10 – Yarbrough	5 – Yarbrough	Athletics–Recreation Center (3,330); Valparaiso, IN
February 14, 2018; 7:00 pm, ESPN3		at Bradley; I-74 Rivalry	L 58–70	14–13 (8–7)	25 – Yarbrough	8 – Ndiaye	2 – Yarbrough, Evans, Tinsley, Gassman, Clarance	Carver Arena (7,731); Peoria, IL
February 17, 2018; 5:00 pm, ESPN2		Northern Iowa	W 79–75	15–13 (9–7)	25 – Yarbrough	6 – Yarbrough	9 – Yarbrough	Doug Collins Court at Redbird Arena (6,535); Normal, IL
February 21, 2018; 7:00 pm, MVC Network		Drake	W 89–81 ^{OT}	16–13 (10–7)	23 – Evans	11 – Fayne	6 – Evans	Doug Collins Court at Redbird Arena (5,028); Normal, IL
February 24, 2018; 1:00 pm, ESPN2		at Loyola–Chicago	L 61–68	16–14 (10–8)	21 – Tinsley	7 – Yarbrough	6 – Yarbrough	Joseph J. Gentile Arena (4,963); Chicago, IL
State Farm Missouri Valley Conference {MVC} Tournament
March 2, 2018*; 8:30 pm, MVC Network	(3)	vs. (6) Indiana State; Quarterfinal	W 77–70	17–14	24 – Yarbrough	10 – Fayne	5 – Yarbrough	Scottrade Center (7,077); St. Louis, MO
March 3, 2018*; 5:00 pm, CBSSN	(3)	vs. (2) Southern Illinois; Semifinal	W 76–68 ^{OT}	18–14	26 – Fayne	9 – Fayne, Tinsley	7 – Evans	Scottrade Center (8,415); St. Louis, MO
March 4, 2018*; 1:00 pm, CBS	(3)	vs. (1) Loyola–Chicago; Final	L 49–65	18–15	12 – Yarbrough, Fayne	12 – Fayne	5 – Yarbrough	Scottrade Center (8,056); St. Louis, MO
*Non-conference game. ^{#}Rankings from AP Poll. (#) Tournament seedings in parentheses. All times are in Central Standard Time.
