= 2017–18 Drake Bulldogs men's basketball team =

American college basketball season

2017–18 Drake Bulldogs men's basketball

Lou Henson Classic champions

CIT, Second round
- Conference: Missouri Valley Conference
- Record: 17–17 (10–8 MVC)
- Head coach: Niko Medved (1st season)
- Assistant coaches: JR Blount; Dave Thorson; Ali Farokhmanesh
- Home arena: Knapp Center

2017–18 Missouri Valley Conference men's basketball standings
	Conf.				Overall
Team	W		L	PCT	W		L	PCT
Loyola Chicago †	15	–	3	.833	32	–	6	.842
Southern Illinois	11	–	7	.611	20	–	13	.606
Illinois State	10	–	8	.556	18	–	15	.545
Drake	10	–	8	.556	17	–	17	.500
Bradley	9	–	9	.500	20	–	13	.606
Indiana State	8	–	10	.444	13	–	18	.419
Missouri State	7	–	11	.389	18	–	15	.545
Evansville	7	–	11	.389	17	–	15	.531
Northern Iowa	7	–	11	.389	16	–	16	.500
Valparaiso	6	–	12	.333	15	–	17	.469
† 2018 MVC tournament winner

The 2017–18 Drake Bulldogs men's basketball team represented Drake University during the 2017–18 NCAA Division I men's basketball season. The Bulldogs were led by first-year head coach Niko Medved. They played their home games at Knapp Center in Des Moines, Iowa as members of the Missouri Valley Conference. They finished the season 17–17, 10–8 in MVC play to finish in to finish in a tie for third place. They lost in the quarterfinals of the MVC tournament to Bradley. They were invited to the CollegeInsider.com Tournament where they defeated Abilene Christian in the first round in a game referred to as the Lou Henson Classic. In the second round they were defeated by Northern Colorado.

On March 22, 2018, it was announced that head coach Niko Medved had accepted the head coaching position at Colorado State, where he had previously served as an assistant. A week after Medved's departure, Drake hired Creighton assistant and Iowa native Darian DeVries for the head coaching job.

== Previous season ==
The Bulldogs finished the 2016–17 season They finished the season 7–24, 5–13 to finish in a tie for ninth place in MVC play. They lost in the first round of the Missouri Valley Conference tournament to Bradley.

Fourth-year head coach Ray Giacoletti resigned on December 6, 2016, after the first eight games of the season. Assistant coach Jeff Rutter was named interim head coach. Following the season, the school chose not to keep Jeff Rutter as head coach and hired Niko Medved, former head coach at Furman, as the Bulldogs' new head coach.

== Offseason ==
=== Departures ===
Name	Number	Pos.	Height	Weight	Year	Hometown	Notes
Bill Wampler	2	F	6'6"	200	Sophomore	Eau Claire, WI	Transferred to Wright State
T. J. Thomas	10	F	6'8"	205	Junior	Stone Mountain, GA	Left the team for personal reasons
Jacob Enevold	11	C	7'0"	246	Senior	Lunderskov, Denmark	Graduated
A. J. Rutter	14	G	6'1"	180	RS Junior	Ames, IA	Walk-on; didn't return
Will Halfon	21	G	6'2"	200	Freshman	Greenwood Village, CO	Walk-on; didn't return
Nick Girardi	24	G	6'4"	180	Freshman	Fort Collins, CO	Walk-on; didn't return
Johannes Dolven	25	F	6'8"	230	RS Freshman	Oslo, Norway	Transferred to Barry

=== 2017 recruiting class ===
College recruiting information
Name	Hometown	School	Height	Weight	Commit date
Jalen Gibbs; SG	Waldorf, Md	North Point High School	6 ft 3 in (1.91 m)	N/A	Apr 25, 2017
Jalen Gibbs; SG	Recruit ratings: Scout: Rivals: (NR)				
Noah Thomas; PG	Sydney, Australia	22Ft Academy	6 ft 2 in (1.88 m)	N/A	May 6, 2017
Noah Thomas; PG	Recruit ratings: Scout: Rivals: (NR)				
Antonio Pilipovic; SF	Cologne, Germany	RheinStars Köln	6 ft 7 in (2.01 m)	205 lb (93 kg)	Jul 13, 2017
Antonio Pilipovic; SF	Recruit ratings: Scout: Rivals: (NR)				
Overall recruit ranking:
Note: In many cases, Scout, Rivals, 247Sports, On3, and ESPN may conflict in their listings of height and weight.; In these cases, the average was taken. ESPN grades are on a 100-point scale.; Sources: "2017 Team Ranking". Rivals.

=== 2018 recruiting class ===
College recruiting information (2018)
Name	Hometown	School	Height	Weight	Commit date
Adam Thistlewood; SF	Golden, CO	Golden High School	6 ft 7 in (2.01 m)	180 lb (82 kg)	Aug 27, 2017
Adam Thistlewood; SF	Recruit ratings: Scout: Rivals: 247Sports: (NR)				
Kendle Moore; PG	Danville, IL	Danville High School	5 ft 10 in (1.78 m)	160 lb (73 kg)	Sep 3, 2017
Kendle Moore; PG	Recruit ratings: Scout: Rivals: (NR)				
James Moors; PF	Auckland, New Zealand	Westlake Boys High School	6 ft 9 in (2.06 m)	200 lb (91 kg)	Sep 15, 2017
James Moors; PF	Recruit ratings: Scout: Rivals: (NR)				
Messiah Jones; SF	Chicago, IL	Neal F. Simeon Career Academy	6 ft 6 in (1.98 m)	190 lb (86 kg)	Oct 1, 2017
Messiah Jones; SF	Recruit ratings: Scout: Rivals: 247Sports: (NR)				
Montrell Horsey; PG	Joppa, MD	Joppatowne High School	6 ft 2 in (1.88 m)	175 lb (79 kg)	Oct 22, 2017
Montrell Horsey; PG	Recruit ratings: Scout: Rivals: (NR)				
Larry Wise; SG	Waxahachie, TX	Waxahachie High School	6 ft 5 in (1.96 m)	175 lb (79 kg)	Dec 2, 2017
Larry Wise; SG	Recruit ratings: Scout: Rivals:				
Matthew Gray; PF	Orange, Australia	Canobolas Rural Technology High School	6 ft 8 in (2.03 m)	N/A	Dec 20, 2017
Matthew Gray; PF	Recruit ratings: Scout: Rivals: (NR)				
Overall recruit ranking:
Note: In many cases, Scout, Rivals, 247Sports, On3, and ESPN may conflict in their listings of height and weight.; In these cases, the average was taken. ESPN grades are on a 100-point scale.; Sources: "2018 Team Ranking". Rivals.

== Preseason ==
In the conference's preseason poll, the Bulldogs were picked to finish in last place in the MVC. Senior guard Reed Timmer was named to the preseason All-MVC first team.

== Roster ==
2017–18 Drake Bulldogs men's basketball team
Players
Coaches

Pos.	#	Name	Height	Weight	Year	Previous school	Hometown
G	0	C. J. Rivers	6 ft 2 in (1.88 m)	187 lb (85 kg)	Sr	Cahokia	Cahokia, IL
G	1	Samm Jones (W)	5 ft 11 in (1.8 m)	180 lb (82 kg)	RS Fr	Northwestern; De La Salle	Minneapolis, MN
G	2	Jalen Gibbs	6 ft 3 in (1.91 m)	180 lb (82 kg)	Fr	North Point	Waldorf, MD
G	3	Graham Woodward	6 ft 0 in (1.83 m)	182 lb (83 kg)	RS Sr	Penn State; Edina HS	Edina, MN
G	4	De'Antae McMurray	6 ft 2 in (1.88 m)	170 lb (77 kg)	Sr	Southwestern Illinois College; Alton HS	Alton, IL
F	11	Antonio Pilipovic	6 ft 7 in (2.01 m)	205 lb (93 kg)	Fr	RheinStars Köln	Cologne, Germany
G	12	Reed Timmer	6 ft 1 in (1.85 m)	185 lb (84 kg)	Sr	Eisenhower	New Berlin, WI
G	14	Noah Thomas	6 ft 2 in (1.88 m)	180 lb (82 kg)	Fr	22 Ft Academy	Sydney, Australia
F	22	Casey Schlatter	6 ft 10 in (2.08 m)	207 lb (94 kg)	RS Jr	Iowa Falls Alden	Iowa Falls, IA
G	23	Ore Arogundade	6 ft 3 in (1.91 m)	185 lb (84 kg)	Sr	St. Viator	Arlington Heights, IL
G	25	Connor Gholson (W)	6 ft 3 in (1.91 m)	170 lb (77 kg)	Fr	Newton	Newton, IA
F/C	32	Kory Kuenstling	6 ft 11 in (2.11 m)	234 lb (106 kg)	RS Jr	Dunkerton	Dunkerton, IA
F	35	Nick McGlynn	6 ft 8 in (2.03 m)	223 lb (101 kg)	Jr	Stoughton	Stoughton, WI

Head coach

- Niko Medved (Minnesota)

Assistant coach(es)

- JR Blount (Loyola Chicago)
- Dave Thorson (Hamline)
- Ali Farokhmanesh (Northern Iowa)

Legend

- (C) Team captain
- (S) Suspended
- (I) Ineligible
- (W) Walk-on
- Injured
- Current redshirt

Roster

== Schedule and results ==
Date time, TV	Rank^{#}	Opponent^{#}	Result	Record	Site (attendance) city, state
Exhibition
November 4, 2017*; 1:00 pm		Minnesota–Crookston	W 86–73		Knapp Center (2,062); Des Moines, IA
Non-conference regular season
November 11, 2017*; 2:00 pm, ESPN3		Coe	W 101–54	1–0	Knapp Center (2,685); Des Moines, IA
November 17, 2017*; 7:30 pm		vs. Wake Forest; Paradise Jam quarterfinals (Note: The tournament was originally scheduled for the Sports and Fitness Center in Saint Thomas, US Virgin Islands, but was moved due to damage from Hurricanes Irma and Maria. Organizers decided to solicit hosting bids from the eight participating teams, with Liberty selected as the substitute host on September 29.)	W 77–74	2–0	Vines Center (586); Lynchburg, VA
November 18, 2017*; 7:30 pm		vs. Colorado; Paradise Jam semifinals	L 81–86	2–1	Vines Center (568); Lynchburg, VA
November 19, 2017*; 5:00 pm		vs. Drexel; Paradise Jam 3rd place game	W 90–88 ^{2OT}	3–1	Vines Center (577); Lynchburg, VA
November 26, 2017*; 2:00 pm, MC22/ESPN3		Chicago State	W 79–67	4–1	Knapp Center (2,386); Des Moines, IA
November 29, 2017*; 7:00 pm		at Omaha	L 73–75	4–2	Baxter Arena (1,525); Omaha, NE
December 2, 2017*; 5:00 pm		at Wyoming; MW–MVC Challenge	L 89–96 ^{2OT}	4–3	Arena-Auditorium (4,853); Laramie, WY
December 6, 2017*; 7:00 pm, ESPN3		at South Dakota	L 65–93	4–4	Sanford Coyote Sports Center (2,101); Vermillion, SD
December 9, 2017*; 5:00 pm, ESPN3		Omaha	W 93–74	5–4	Knapp Center (2,718); Des Moines, IA
December 11, 2017*; 7:00 pm, BTN		at Minnesota	L 67–68	5–5	Williams Arena (11,319); Minneapolis, MN
December 16, 2017*; 1:00 pm, BTN		vs. Iowa; Hy-Vee Classic	L 64–90	5–6	Wells Fargo Arena (13,828); Des Moines, IA
December 19, 2017*; 7:00 pm		at South Dakota State	L 74–87	5–7	Frost Arena (1,525); Brookings, SD
December 22, 2017*; 7:00 pm, MC22/ESPN3		Maryland Eastern Shore	W 81–57	6–7	Knapp Center (2,214); Des Moines, IA
MVC regular season
December 28, 2017; 7:00 pm, MC22/ESPN3		Bradley	W 66–64	7–7 (1–0)	Knapp Center (2,611); Des Moines, IA
December 31, 2017; 3:00 pm, ESPN3		at Southern Illinois	W 70–67	8–7 (2–0)	SIU Arena (4,230); Carbondale, IL
January 3, 2018; 7:00 pm, MC22/ESPN3		Illinois State	W 87–62	9–7 (3–0)	Knapp Center (3,113); Des Moines, IA
January 6, 2018; 1:00 pm, ESPN3		at Indiana State	W 75–72	10–7 (4–0)	Hulman Center (3,249); Terre Haute, IN
January 10, 2018; 7:00 pm, ESPN3		at Valparaiso	L 60–77	10–8 (4–1)	Athletics–Recreation Center (2,710); Valparaiso, IN
January 13, 2018; 2:00 pm, ESPN3		Evansville	W 81–65	11–8 (5–1)	Knapp Center (3,313); Des Moines, IA
January 16, 2018; 7:00 pm, ESPN3		at Northern Iowa	L 54–68	11–9 (5–2)	McLeod Center (3,880); Cedar Falls, IA
January 20, 2018; 3:00 pm, FSMW/NBCSC		Missouri State	W 61–58	12–9 (6–2)	Knapp Center (3,647); Des Moines, IA
January 24, 2018; 7:00 pm, MC22/ESPN3		Loyola–Chicago	L 57–80	12–10 (6–3)	Knapp Center (3,522); Des Moines, IA
January 27, 2018; 1:00 pm, ESPN3		at Evansville	L 73–77	12–11 (6–4)	Ford Center (4,295); Evansville, IN
January 30, 2018; 7:00 pm, MC22/ESPN3		Southern Illinois	L 67–78	12–12 (6–5)	Knapp Center (3,198); Des Moines, IA
February 3, 2018; 7:00 pm, ESPN3		at Bradley	W 78–68	13–12 (7–5)	Carver Arena (7,793); Peoria, IL
February 7, 2018; 7:00 pm, NBCSC		at Loyola–Chicago	L 57–72	13–13 (7–6)	Joseph J. Gentile Arena (2,802); Chicago, IL
February 10, 2018; 3:00 pm, FSMW		Northern Iowa	W 71–64	14–13 (8–6)	Knapp Center (5,121); Des Moines, IA
February 14, 2018; 7:00 pm, MC22/ESPN3		Indiana State	W 90–76	15–13 (9–6)	Knapp Center (2,617); Des Moines, IA
February 18, 2018; 3:00 pm, ESPNU		at Missouri State	W 67–63	16–13 (10–6)	JQH Arena (4,859); Springfield, MO
February 21, 2018; 7:00 pm		at Illinois State	L 81–89 ^{OT}	16–14 (10–7)	Redbird Arena (5,028); Normal, IL
February 24, 2018; 2:00 pm, ESPN3		Valparaiso	L 64–69	16–15 (10–8)	Knapp Center (4,025); Des Moines, IA
MVC tournament
March 2, 2018; 2:30 pm, ESPN3	(4)	vs. (5) Bradley; Quarterfinals	L 61–63	16–16	Scottrade Center (6,410); St. Louis, MO
CIT
March 12, 2018*; 1:00 pm, CBSSN		Abilene Christian; First Round – Lou Henson Classic	W 80–73 ^{OT}	17–16	Knapp Center (3,565); Des Moines, IA
March 18, 2018*; 4:00 pm		at Northern Colorado; Second Round	L 72–81	17–17	Bank of Colorado Arena (1,074); Greeley, CO
*Non-conference game. ^{#}Rankings from AP Poll. (#) Tournament seedings in parentheses. All times are in Central Time.
