= 2017–18 Missouri State Bears basketball team =

American college basketball season

2017–18 Missouri State Bears basketball
- Conference: Missouri Valley Conference
- Record: 18–15 (7–11 MVC)
- Head coach: Paul Lusk (7th season)
- Assistant coaches: Corey Gipson; Matt Sligh; Keith Pickens
- Home arena: JQH Arena

2017–18 Missouri Valley Conference men's basketball standings
	Conf.				Overall
Team	W		L	PCT	W		L	PCT
Loyola Chicago †	15	–	3	.833	32	–	6	.842
Southern Illinois	11	–	7	.611	20	–	13	.606
Illinois State	10	–	8	.556	18	–	15	.545
Drake	10	–	8	.556	17	–	17	.500
Bradley	9	–	9	.500	20	–	13	.606
Indiana State	8	–	10	.444	13	–	18	.419
Missouri State	7	–	11	.389	18	–	15	.545
Evansville	7	–	11	.389	17	–	15	.531
Northern Iowa	7	–	11	.389	16	–	16	.500
Valparaiso	6	–	12	.333	15	–	17	.469
† 2018 MVC tournament winner

The 2017–18 Missouri State Bears basketball team represented Missouri State University during the 2017–18 NCAA Division I men's basketball season. The Bears, led by seventh-year head coach Paul Lusk, played their home games at JQH Arena in Springfield, Missouri as members of the Missouri Valley Conference. Despite being the preseason favorite in the MVC, the Bears finished the season 18–15, 7–11 in MVC play to finish in a three-way tie for seventh place. As the No. 7 seed in the MVC tournament, they beat Valparaiso in the first round before losing to Southern Illinois in the quarterfinals.

On March 3, 2018, the school announced that head coach Paul Lusk had been fired. He finished at Missouri State with a seven-year record of 106–121. The school announced that former Tennessee State head coach Dana Ford had been named head coach of the Bears on March 21.

== Previous season ==
The Bears finished the 2016–17 season 17–16, 7–11 in MVC play to finish in a tie for sixth place. As the No. 6 seed in the MVC tournament, they defeated Northern Iowa in the quarterfinals before losing to Wichita State in the semifinals.

== Offseason ==
=== Departures ===
Name	Number	Pos.	Height	Weight	Year	Hometown	Reason for departure
Jordan Martin	0	F	6'8"	235	Senior	St. Louis, MO	Graduated
Robin Thompson	1	F	6'6"	224	RS Sophomore	St. Louis, MO	Transferred to Maryville
Dequon Miller	4	G	5'10"	176	Senior	Charleston, WV	Graduated
Austin Ruder	15	G	6'3"	199	Senior	Nixa, MO	Graduated
Chris Kendrix	33	F	6'5"	185	Junior	Willard, MO	Graduate transferred to Minnesota State
Tyler McCullough	50	C	6'11"	252	Senior	Fayetteville, AR	Graduated

=== Incoming transfers ===
Name	Number	Pos.	Height	Weight	Year	Hometown	Previous School
Abdul-Hakim Fofana	0	F	6'7"	220	Junior	Bobo Dioulasso, Burkina Faso	Junior college transferred from Dakota College at Bottineau
Reggie Scurry	2	F	6'7"	220	Junior	Atlanta, GA	Junior college transferred from Northern Oklahoma College
James Miller	23	G	6'4"	185	RS Senior	Clinton, NC	Transferred from Howard. Will be eligible to play immediately since Miller graduated from Howard.
Tanveer Bhullar	34	C	7'2"	285	RS Senior	Toronto, ON	Transferred from New Mexico. Will be eligible to play immediately since Bhullar graduated from New Mexico State.

=== 2017 recruiting class ===
College recruiting information
Name	Hometown	School	Height	Weight	Commit date
Jared Ridder; SF	Springfield, MO	Kickapoo High School	6 ft 5 in (1.96 m)	180 lb (82 kg)	Jun 8, 2016
Jared Ridder; SF	Recruit ratings: Scout: Rivals: 247Sports: (81)				
Darian Scott #67 C	Las Vegas, NV	Centennial High School	6 ft 9 in (2.06 m)	220 lb (100 kg)	Oct 4, 2016
Darian Scott #67 C	Recruit ratings: Scout: Rivals: 247Sports: (68)				
Mustafa Lawrence; PG	Las Vegas, NV	Forest Hills High School	5 ft 11 in (1.80 m)	165 lb (75 kg)	Oct 22, 2016
Mustafa Lawrence; PG	Recruit ratings: Scout: Rivals: 247Sports: (NA)				
Overall recruit ranking:
Note: In many cases, Scout, Rivals, 247Sports, On3, and ESPN may conflict in their listings of height and weight.; In these cases, the average was taken. ESPN grades are on a 100-point scale.; Sources: "2017 Team Ranking". Rivals.

== Preseason ==
In the conference's preseason poll, the Bears were picked to win the MVC, receiving 30 of 40 first place votes. Senior forward Alize Johnson was named the preseason MVC Player of the Year.

== Roster ==
2017–18 Missouri State Bears men's basketball team
Players
Coaches

Pos.	#	Name	Height	Weight	Year	Previous school	Hometown
F	0	Abdul Fofana	6 ft 7 in (2.01 m)	207 lb (94 kg)	Jr	Saint Exupery French Secondary School; Dakota College	Bobo Dioulasso, Burkina Faso
G	1	Mustafa Lawrence	6 ft 0 in (1.83 m)	186 lb (84 kg)	Fr	Essex County Vocational	Newark, NJ
F	2	Reggie Scurry	6 ft 5 in (1.96 m)	213 lb (97 kg)	Jr	North Clayton; Northern Oklahoma College	Atlanta, GA
G	3	James Byrd (W)	6 ft 1 in (1.85 m)	185 lb (84 kg)	Jr	Park Hill South; Penn Valley CC	Kansas City, MO
F	5	Onediah Church	6 ft 8 in (2.03 m)	225 lb (102 kg)	Jr	Springfield	Springfield, IL
G	11	Jarred Dixon	6 ft 4 in (1.93 m)	171 lb (78 kg)	Jr	Lee's Summit West	Kansas City, MO
G	13	Greg Williams	6 ft 6 in (1.98 m)	180 lb (82 kg)	RS Fr	Home School	Houston, TX
G	14	Ronnie Rousseau III	5 ft 10 in (1.78 m)	163 lb (74 kg)	Sr	Winton Woods; State Fair CC	Cincinnati, OH
F	15	Jarrid Rhodes	6 ft 6 in (1.98 m)	185 lb (84 kg)	Sr	Palmetto; Northern Oklahoma College	Palmetto, FL
G	20	Ryan Kreklow	6 ft 4 in (1.93 m)	186 lb (84 kg)	Jr	Rock Bridge	Columbia, MO
G	21	Ross Owens (W)	6 ft 4 in (1.93 m)	191 lb (87 kg)	So	Woodlawn	Woodlawn, IL
G	23	J. T. Miller	6 ft 2 in (1.88 m)	190 lb (86 kg)	RS Sr	Mt. Zion; Howard	Clinton, NC
F	24	Alize Johnson	6 ft 9 in (2.06 m)	212 lb (96 kg)	Sr	St. John Neumann; Frank Phillips College	Williamsport, PA
C	25	Darian Scott	6 ft 11 in (2.11 m)	200 lb (91 kg)	Fr	Centennial	Las Vegas, NV
C	34	Tanveer Bhullar	7 ft 2 in (2.18 m)	278 lb (126 kg)	RS Sr	Father Henry Carr Catholic Secondary; New Mexico State	Etobicoke, ON
F	35	Jared Ridder (W) (redshirt)	6 ft 7 in (2.01 m)	180 lb (82 kg)	Fr	Kickapoo; Xavier	Springfield, MO

Head coach

- Paul Lusk (Southern Illinois)

Assistant coach(es)

- Corey Gipson (Austin Peay)
- Matt Sligh (Covenant College)
- Keith Pickens (Missouri State)

Legend

- (C) Team captain
- (S) Suspended
- (I) Ineligible
- (W) Walk-on
- Injured
- Current redshirt

Roster

== Schedule and results ==
Date time, TV	Rank^{#}	Opponent^{#}	Result	Record	Site city, state
Exhibition
Oct 21, 2017*; 12:00 pm		at Kansas State	L 62–78		Bramlage Coliseum; Manhattan, KS
Nov 1, 2017*; 7:00 pm		Southwest Baptist	W 83–56		JQH Arena (3,926); Springfield, MO
Non-conference regular season
Nov 10, 2017*; 7:00 pm		at Western Kentucky	W 85–80	1–0	E. A. Diddle Arena (5,241); Bowling Green, KY
Nov 15, 2017*; 5:30 pm, ESPN3		Southern	W 86–58	2–0	JQH Arena (4,876); Springfield, MO
Nov 17, 2017*; 7:00 pm, ESPN3		North Dakota State	L 54–57	2–1	JQH Arena (4,703); Springfield, MO
Nov 20, 2017*; 12:30 pm		vs. Georgia Southern; Gulf Coast Showcase quarterfinals	L 73–74	2–2	Germain Arena (823); Estero, FL
Nov 21, 2017*; 10:00 am		vs. Manhattan; Gulf Coast Showcase consolation round	W 69–65	3–2	Germain Arena (841); Estero, FL
Nov 22, 2017*; 12:30 pm		at Florida Atlantic; Gulf Coast Showcase 5th place game	W 71–60	4–2	Germain Arena (868); Estero, FL
Nov 24, 2017*; 7:00 pm, ESPN3		Evangel	W 80–48	5–2	JQH Arena (3,485); Springfield, MO
Nov 28, 2017*; 7:00 pm, ESPN3		Colorado State; MV–MVC Challenge	W 77–67	6–2	JQH Arena (4,895); Springfield, MO
Dec 2, 2017*; 7:00 pm, ESPN3		at South Dakota State	W 73–53	7–2	Frost Arena (2,001); Sioux Falls, SD
Dec 2, 2017*; 7:00 pm, ESPN3		at North Dakota State	W 71–58	8–2	Scheels Arena (1,704); Fargo, ND
Dec 8, 2017*; 7:00 pm, ESPN3		Hampton	W 88–75	9–2	JQH Arena (4,612); Springfield, MO
Dec 10, 2017*; 3:00 pm		at Oral Roberts	L 66–73	9–3	Mabee Center (2,331); Tulsa, OK
Dec 19, 2017*; 7:00 pm, ESPN3		Wright State	W 66–50	10–3	JQH Arena (3,123); Springfield, MO
Missouri Valley regular season
Dec 22, 2017; 8:00 pm, FSMW		at Loyola–Chicago	W 64–59	11–3 (1–0)	JQH Arena (4583); Springfield, MO
Dec 31, 2017; 3:00 pm, ESPN3		at Valparaiso	W 67–50	12–3 (2–0)	Athletics–Recreation Center (2,440); Valparaiso, IN
Jan 4, 2018; 8:00 pm, CBSSN		Northern Iowa	W 62–55	13–3 (3–0)	JQH Arena (4,934); Springfield, MO
Jan 7, 2018; 1:00 pm, CBSSN		at Illinois State	L 68–72	13–4 (3–1)	Redbird Arena (4,344); Normal, IL
Jan 10, 2018; 7:00 pm, ESPN3		at Evansville	L 55–64	13–5 (3–2)	Ford Center (3,237); Evansville, IN
Jan 14, 2018; 2:00 pm, ESPN3		Indiana State	W 76–73	14–5 (4–2)	JQH Arena (4,137); Springfield, MO
Jan 17, 2018; 7:00 pm, ESPN3		Valparaiso	W 64–57	15–5 (5–2)	JQH Arena (4,876); Springfield, MO
Jan 20, 2018; 3:00 pm, FSMW		at Drake	L 58–61	15–6 (5–3)	Knapp Center (3,647); Des Moines, IA
Jan 23, 2018; 7:00 pm		at Bradley	L 52–72	15–7 (5–4)	Carver Arena (5,041); Peoria, IL
Jan 27, 2018; 5:00 pm, ESPNU		Southern Illinois	L 77–79	15–8 (5–5)	JQH Arena (6,724); Springfield, MO
Jan 30, 2018; 7:00 pm, ESPN3		Illinois State	L 60–76	15–9 (5–6)	JQH Arena (4,545); Springfield, MO
Feb 3, 2018; 1:00 pm, CBSSN		at Loyola–Chicago	L 75–97	15–10 (5–7)	Joseph J. Gentile Arena; Chicago, IL
Feb 6, 2018; 6:00 pm, ESPN3		at Indiana State	W 81–62	16–10 (6–7)	Hulman Center (4,040); Terre Haute, IN
Feb 10, 2018; 2:00 pm, ESPN3		Evansville	W 72–55	17–10 (7–7)	JQH Arena (3,358); Springfield, MO
Feb 14, 2018; 7:00 pm, FSMW		at Southern Illinois	L 80–81 ^{OT}	17–11 (7–8)	SIU Arena (4,285); Carbondale, IL
Feb 18, 2018; 3:00 pm, ESPNU		Drake	L 63–67	17–12 (7–9)	JQH Arena (4,859); Springfield, MO
Feb 21, 2018; 7:00 pm, FSMW		Bradley	L 78–82	17–13 (7–10)	JQH Arena (4,054); Springfield, MO
Feb 24, 2018; 7:00 pm, ESPN3		at Northern Iowa	L 56–71	17–14 (7–11)	McLeod Center (4,834); Cedar Falls, IA
Missouri Valley tournament
Mar 1, 2018; 8:30 pm, ESPN3	(7)	vs. (10) Valparaiso; First round	W 83–79	18–14	Scottrade Center (4,852); St. Louis, MO
Mar 2, 2018; 6:00 pm, ESPN3	(7)	vs. (2) Southern Illinois; Quarterfinals	L 63–67	18–15	Scottrade Center (7,077); St. Louis, MO
*Non-conference game. ^{#}Rankings from AP Poll. (#) Tournament seedings in parentheses. All times are in Central Time.
