= 2018 Missouri Valley Conference men's basketball tournament =

- Classification: Division I
- Season: 2017–18
- Teams: 10
- Site: Scottrade Center; St. Louis, Missouri
- Champions: Loyola–Chicago (1st title)
- Winning coach: Porter Moser (1st title)
- MVP: Donte Ingram (Loyola–Chicago)
- Television: CBS, CBSSN, MVC TV (ESPN3)

2017–18 Missouri Valley Conference men's basketball standings
	Conf.				Overall
Team	W		L	PCT	W		L	PCT
Loyola Chicago †	15	–	3	.833	32	–	6	.842
Southern Illinois	11	–	7	.611	20	–	13	.606
Illinois State	10	–	8	.556	18	–	15	.545
Drake	10	–	8	.556	17	–	17	.500
Bradley	9	–	9	.500	20	–	13	.606
Indiana State	8	–	10	.444	13	–	18	.419
Missouri State	7	–	11	.389	18	–	15	.545
Evansville	7	–	11	.389	17	–	15	.531
Northern Iowa	7	–	11	.389	16	–	16	.500
Valparaiso	6	–	12	.333	15	–	17	.469
† 2018 MVC tournament winner

The 2018 Missouri Valley Conference men's basketball tournament, popularly referred to as "Arch Madness", was the postseason men's basketball tournament that completed the 2017–18 season in the Missouri Valley Conference. The Tournament was held at the Scottrade Center, now known as the Enterprise Center, in St. Louis, Missouri from March 1–4, 2018.

The Tournament marked the first tournament with Valparaiso as a member of the MVC, having replaced Wichita State when the Shockers joined the American Athletic Conference in June 2017.

The tournament's top seed, Loyola–Chicago defeated the No. 3 seed Illinois State in the championship game to receive the Missouri Valley's automatic bid to the NCAA tournament.

== Seeds ==
Teams were seeded by conference record, with ties broken by overall record in conference games played between the tied teams, then (if necessary) by overall adjusted RPI on the day following the conclusion of the regular season as calculated in Collegiate Basketball News' Men's RPI Report. The top six seeds received opening round byes.

With a win at Southern Illinois on February 21, Loyola–Chicago clinched the outright MVC championship and the No. 1 seed.

Seed	School	Conference	Tiebreaker 1	Tiebreaker 2
1	Loyola–Chicago	15–3		
2	Southern Illinois	11–7		
3	Illinois State	10–8	1–1 vs. Drake	RPI: 84
4	Drake	10–8	1–1 vs. Illinois St	RPI: 162
5	Bradley	9–9		
6	Indiana State	8–10		
7	Missouri State	7–11	1–1 vs. Evansville, 1–1 vs. N. Iowa	RPI: 133
8	Evansville	7–11	1–1 vs. Missouri St, 1–1 vs. N. Iowa	RPI: 137
9	Northern Iowa	7–11	1–1 vs. Missouri St, 1–1 vs. Evansville	RPI: 141
10	Valparaiso	6–12		

== Schedule ==
Game	Time *	Matchup	Score	Television
Opening round – Thursday, March 1
1	6:00 pm	No. 8 Evansville vs. No. 9 Northern Iowa	50–60	MVC TV [ESPN3]
2	8:30 pm	No. 7 Missouri State vs. No. 10 Valparaiso	83–79	MVC TV [ESPN3]
Quarterfinals – Friday, March 2
3	12:00 pm	No. 1 Loyola–Chicago vs. No. 9 Northern Iowa	54–50	MVC TV [ESPN3]
4	2:30 pm	No. 4 Drake vs. No. 5 Bradley	61–63	MVC TV [ESPN3]
5	6:00 pm	No. 2 Southern Illinois vs. No. 7 Missouri State	67–63	MVC TV [ESPN3]
6	8:30 pm	No. 3 Illinois State vs. No. 6 Indiana State	77–70	MVC TV [ESPN3]
Semifinals – Saturday, March 3
7	2:30 pm	No. 1 Loyola–Chicago vs. No. 5 Bradley	62–54	CBSSN
8	5:00 pm	No. 2 Southern Illinois vs. No. 3 Illinois State	68–76^{OT}	CBSSN
Final – Sunday, March 4
9	1:00 pm	No. 1 Loyola–Chicago vs. No. 3 Illinois State	65–49	CBS
* Game times in CST; rankings denote tournament seed.

== Tournament bracket ==
Opening round Thursday, March 1 MVC TV/ESPN3
8	Evansville	50
9	Northern Iowa	60
7	Missouri State	83
10	Valparaiso	79

Quarterfinals; Friday, March 2 MVC TV/ESPN3
1	Loyola–Chicago	54
9	Northern Iowa	50
4	Drake	61
5	Bradley	63
2	Southern Illinois	67
7	Missouri State	63
3	Illinois State	77
6	Indiana State	70

Semifinals; Saturday, March 3 CBSSN
1	Loyola–Chicago	62
5	Bradley	54
2	Southern Illinois	68
3	Illinois State	76*

Final; Sunday, March 4 CBS
1	Loyola–Chicago	65
3	Illinois State	49

* denotes overtime period
