= 2017–18 Northern Iowa Panthers men's basketball team =

American college basketball season

2017–18 Northern Iowa Panthers men's basketball
- Conference: Missouri Valley Conference
- Record: 16–16 (7–11 MVC)
- Head coach: Ben Jacobson (12th season)
- Assistant coaches: P.J. Hogan; Erik Crawford; Kyle Green
- Home arena: McLeod Center

2017–18 Missouri Valley Conference men's basketball standings
| | Conf. | | | | Overall |
| Team | W | | L | PCT | W | | L | PCT |
|---|---|---|---|---|---|---|---|---|
| Loyola Chicago † | 15 | – | 3 | .833 | 32 | – | 6 | .842 |
| Southern Illinois | 11 | – | 7 | .611 | 20 | – | 13 | .606 |
| Illinois State | 10 | – | 8 | .556 | 18 | – | 15 | .545 |
| Drake | 10 | – | 8 | .556 | 17 | – | 17 | .500 |
| Bradley | 9 | – | 9 | .500 | 20 | – | 13 | .606 |
| Indiana State | 8 | – | 10 | .444 | 13 | – | 18 | .419 |
| Missouri State | 7 | – | 11 | .389 | 18 | – | 15 | .545 |
| Evansville | 7 | – | 11 | .389 | 17 | – | 15 | .531 |
| Northern Iowa | 7 | – | 11 | .389 | 16 | – | 16 | .500 |
| Valparaiso | 6 | – | 12 | .333 | 15 | – | 17 | .469 |
† 2018 MVC tournament winner

The 2017–18 Northern Iowa Panthers men's basketball team represented the University of Northern Iowa during the 2017–18 NCAA Division I men's basketball season. The Panthers, led by 12th-year head coach Ben Jacobson, played their home games at the McLeod Center in Cedar Falls, Iowa as members of the Missouri Valley Conference. They finished the season 16–16, 7–11 in MVC play to finish three-way tie for seventh place. As the No. 7 seed in the MVC tournament, they defeated Evansville in the first round before losing to Loyola–Chicago in the quarterfinals.

== Previous season ==
The Panthers finished the 2016–17 season 14–16, 9–9 in MVC play to finish in a tie for third place. As the No. 3 seed in the MVC tournament, they lost to Missouri State in the quarterfinals.

== Offseason ==
=== Departures ===
| Name | Number | Pos. | Height | Weight | Year | Hometown | Notes |
|---|---|---|---|---|---|---|---|
| Paul Jesperson | 4 | G | 6'6" | 206 | RS Senior | Merrill, WI | Graduated |
| Matt Bohannon | 5 | G | 6'4" | 195 | Senior | Marion, IA | Graduated |
| Wes Washpun | 11 | G | 6'1" | 175 | Senior | Cedar Rapids, IA | Graduated |
| Jeremy Morgan | 20 | G | 6'5" | 195 | Senior | Coralville, IA | Graduated |
| Jordan Ashton | 23 | G | 6'4" | 192 | RS Senior | Mount Pleasant, IA | Graduated |

=== 2017 recruiting class ===
College recruiting information
| Name | Hometown | School | Height | Weight | Commit date |
|---|---|---|---|---|---|
| Austin Phyfe; PF | Waverly, IA | Waverly-Shell Rock High School | 6 ft 9 in (2.06 m) | 225 lb (102 kg) | Nov 5, 2015 |
| Austin Phyfe; PF | Recruit ratings: Scout: Rivals: (NR) | | | | |
| Tywhon Pickford; G/F | Osseo, MN | Maple Grove Rock High School | 6 ft 4 in (1.93 m) | 185 lb (84 kg) | Apr 25, 2015 |
| Tywhon Pickford; G/F | Recruit ratings: Scout: Rivals: (NR) | | | | |
Overall recruit ranking:
Note: In many cases, Scout, Rivals, 247Sports, On3, and ESPN may conflict in their listings of height and weight.; In these cases, the average was taken. ESPN grades are on a 100-point scale.; Sources: "2017 Team Ranking". Rivals.

=== 2018 recruiting class ===
College recruiting information (2018)
| Name | Hometown | School | Height | Weight | Commit date |
|---|---|---|---|---|---|
| A. J. Green #18 PG | Cedar Falls, IA | Cedar Falls High School | 6 ft 3 in (1.91 m) | 165 lb (75 kg) | Aug 11, 2017 |
| A. J. Green #18 PG | Recruit ratings: Scout: Rivals: (84) | | | | |
Overall recruit ranking:
Note: In many cases, Scout, Rivals, 247Sports, On3, and ESPN may conflict in their listings of height and weight.; In these cases, the average was taken. ESPN grades are on a 100-point scale.; Sources: "2018 Team Ranking". Rivals.

=== 2019 recruiting class ===
College recruiting information (2019)
| Name | Hometown | School | Height | Weight | Commit date |
|---|---|---|---|---|---|
| James Betz; PF | Garner, IA | Garner-Hayfield High School | 6 ft 7 in (2.01 m) | 210 lb (95 kg) | Aug 11, 2017 |
| James Betz; PF | Recruit ratings: Scout: Rivals: (N/A) | | | | |
Overall recruit ranking:
Note: In many cases, Scout, Rivals, 247Sports, On3, and ESPN may conflict in their listings of height and weight.; In these cases, the average was taken. ESPN grades are on a 100-point scale.; Sources: "2019 Team Ranking". Rivals.

== Preseason ==
In the conference's preseason poll, the Panthers were picked to finish in second place in the MVC and received eight first place votes. Senior forward Bennet Koch was named to the preseason All-MVC first team while senior forward Klint Carlson was named to the second team.

== Roster ==
2017–18 Northern Iowa Panthers men's basketball team
Players
Coaches

| Pos. | # | Name | Height | Weight | Year | Previous school | Hometown |
|---|---|---|---|---|---|---|---|
| G | 1 | Adam McDermott (W) | 6 ft 4 in (1.93 m) | 190 lb (86 kg) | RS So | Xavier | Cedar Rapids, IA |
| F | 2 | Klint Carlson | 6 ft 7 in (2.01 m) | 225 lb (102 kg) | RS Sr | Waverly-Shell Rock | Waverly, IA |
| C | 3 | Ted Friedman | 6 ft 9 in (2.06 m) | 245 lb (111 kg) | RS Sr | Ankeny | Ankeny, IA |
| G/F | 4 | Tywhon Pickford | 6 ft 4 in (1.93 m) | 200 lb (91 kg) | Fr | Maple Grove | Minneapolis, MN |
| G | 5 | Rafael de Souza (W) | 6 ft 1 in (1.85 m) | 180 lb (82 kg) | Sr | Gulf Coast State College | Jundiaí, Brazil |
| G | 10 | Miles Wentzien (W) | 6 ft 3 in (1.91 m) | 190 lb (86 kg) | Jr | Fort Madison; Kirkwood CC | Fort Madison, IA |
| F | 12 | Lincoln Conrey | 6 ft 7 in (2.01 m) | 218 lb (99 kg) | RS So | Waterloo West | Waterloo, IA |
| G | 13 | Juwan McCloud | 5 ft 11 in (1.8 m) | 173 lb (78 kg) | So | Germantown | Germantown, WI |
| C | 15 | Justin Dahl | 6 ft 11 in (2.11 m) | 250 lb (113 kg) | RS So | Holy Family | Carver, MN |
| G | 21 | Hunter Rhodes | 6 ft 0 in (1.83 m) | 175 lb (79 kg) | Sr | Canton; Kirkwood CC | Canton, IL |
| F | 22 | Tanner Lohaus | 6 ft 7 in (2.01 m) | 205 lb (93 kg) | RS Fr | Iowa City West | North Liberty, IA |
| G | 24 | Isaiah Brown | 6 ft 5 in (1.96 m) | 172 lb (78 kg) | So | Flower Mound | Flower Mound, TX |
| F/C | 25 | Bennett Koch | 6 ft 10 in (2.08 m) | 235 lb (107 kg) | RS Sr | Ashwaubenon | Ashwaubenon, WI |
| G | 30 | Spencer Haldeman | 6 ft 1 in (1.85 m) | 173 lb (78 kg) | RS So | Western Dubuque | Peosta, IA |
| G | 33 | Wyatt Lohaus | 6 ft 2 in (1.88 m) | 180 lb (82 kg) | RS Jr | Iowa City West | North Liberty, IA |
| F | 34 | Luke McDonnell | 6 ft 9 in (2.06 m) | 218 lb (99 kg) | RS So | Dubuque Senior | Dubuque, IA |
| F | 50 | Austin Phyfe | 6 ft 9 in (2.06 m) | 235 lb (107 kg) | Fr | Waverly-Shell Rock | Waverly, IA |

Head coach

- Ben Jacobson (North Dakota)

Assistant coach(es)

- P.J. Hogan (Morningside)
- Erik Crawford (Iowa State)
- Kyle Green (Hamline)

Legend

- (C) Team captain
- (S) Suspended
- (I) Ineligible
- (W) Walk-on
- Injured
- Current redshirt

Roster

== Schedule and results ==
| Date time, TV | Rank^{#} | Opponent^{#} | Result | Record | Site (attendance) city, state |
Exhibition
| Nov 1, 2017*; 7:00 pm, BTN+ | | at Wisconsin; Team Rubicon benefit exhibition | L 38–69 | – | Kohl Center (17,287); Madison, WI |
| Nov 5, 2017*; 1:00 pm, ESPN3 | | UNC Pembroke | W 72–66 | — | McLeod Center (3,090); Cedar Falls, IA |
Non-conference regular season
| Nov 10, 2017*; 6:00 pm, ESPNU | | at No. 9 North Carolina | L 69–86 | 0–1 | Dean Smith Center (18,926); Chapel Hill, NC |
| Nov 13, 2017*; 7:00 pm, PSN/ESPN3 | | Alcorn State | W 73–45 | 1–1 | McLeod Center (3,385); Cedar Falls, IA |
| Nov 15, 2017*; 7:00 pm, ESPN3 | | Wartburg | W 72–43 | 2–1 | McLeod Center (3,678); Cedar Falls, IA |
| Nov 18, 2017*; 11:00 am, ESPN3 | | Chicago State; Battle 4 Atlantis campus-site game | W 82–44 | 3–1 | McLeod Center (3,051); Cedar Falls, IA |
| Nov 22, 2017*; 8:30 pm, ESPN3 | | vs. SMU; Battle 4 Atlantis quarterfinals | W 61–58 | 4–1 | Imperial Arena (909); Nassau, BAH |
| Nov 23, 2017*; 2:00 pm, ESPN2 | | vs. NC State; Battle 4 Atlantis semifinals | W 64–60 | 5–1 | Imperial Arena (892); Nassau, BAH |
| Nov 24, 2017*; 11:00 am, ESPN2 | | vs. No. 5 Villanova; Battle 4 Atlantis finals | L 50–64 | 5–2 | Imperial Arena (2,831); Nassau, BAH |
| Nov 29, 2017*; 7:00 pm, ESPN3 | | UNLV; MW–MVC Challenge | W 77–68 ^{OT} | 6–2 | Mcleod Center (4,546); Cedar Falls, IA |
| Dec 7, 2017*; 7:00 pm, PSN/ESPN3 | | Texas–Arlington | W 62–58 | 7–2 | McLeod Center (3,630); Cedar Falls, IA |
| Dec 10, 2017*; 4:00 pm, ESPN3 | | Dubuque | W 80–47 | 8–2 | McLeod Center; Cedar Falls, IA |
| Dec 16, 2017*; 3:30 pm, MC22 | | vs. Iowa State; Big Four Classic | L 65–76 | 8–3 | Wells Fargo Arena (13,828); Des Moines, IA |
| Dec 22, 2017*; 8:00 pm, CBSSN | | No. 9 Xavier | L 67–77 | 8–4 | McLeod Center (6,355); Cedar Falls, IA |
Missouri Valley Conference regular season
| Dec 28, 2017; 7:00 pm, PSN/ESPN3 | | Southern Illinois | L 53–56 | 8–5 (0–1) | McLeod Center (4,933); Cedar Falls, IA |
| Dec 31, 2017; 1:00 pm, ESPN3 | | at Bradley | L 53–72 | 8–6 (0–2) | Carver Arena (5,684); Peoria, IL |
| Jan 4, 2018; 8:00 pm, CBSSN | | at Missouri State | L 55–62 | 8–7 (0–3) | JQH Arena (4,934); Springfield, MO |
| Jan 7, 2018; 3:00 pm, ESPNU | | Loyola–Chicago | L 50–56 | 8–8 (0–4) | McLeod Center (3,765); Cedar Falls, IA |
| Jan 10, 2018; 6:00 pm, FSMW/NBCSC | | at Indiana State | L 67–69 | 8–9 (0–5) | Hulman Center (3,216); Terre Haute, IN |
| Jan 13, 2018; 6:00 pm, ESPN2 | | Valparaiso | W 81–76 | 9–9 (1–5) | McLeod Center (4,707); Cedar Falls, IA |
| Jan 16, 2018; 7:00 pm, PSN/ESPN3 | | Drake | W 68–54 | 10–9 (2–5) | McLeod Center (3,880); Cedar Falls, IA |
| Jan 21, 2018; 3:00 pm, ESPN3 | | at Southern Illinois | L 53–64 | 10–10 (2–6) | SIU Arena (3,254); Carbondale, IL |
| Jan 24, 2018; 7:00 pm, ESPN3 | | Illinois State | W 83–72 | 11–10 (3–6) | McLeod Center (3,762); Cedar Falls, IA |
| Jan 28, 2018; 3:00 pm, ESPNU | | at Loyola–Chicago | L 47–70 | 11–11 (3–7) | Joseph J. Gentile Arena (2,658); Chicago, IL |
| Jan 31, 2018; 7:00 pm, ESPN3 | | at Evansville | L 49–57 | 11–12 (3–8) | Ford Center (3,352); Evansville, IN |
| Feb 3, 2018; 3:00 pm, FSMW/NBCSC | | Indiana State | L 66–77 | 11–13 (3–9) | McLeod Center (4,564); Cedar Falls, IA |
| Feb 7, 2018; 7:00 pm, ESPN3 | | Bradley | W 74–65 | 12–13 (4–9) | McLeod Center (3,794); Cedar Falls, IA |
| Feb 10, 2018; 3:00 pm, FSMW/NBCSC | | at Drake | L 64–71 | 12–14 (4–10) | Knapp Center (5,121); Des Moines, IA |
| Feb 13, 2018; 7:00 pm, PSN/ESPN3 | | Evansville | W 47–41 | 13–14 (5–10) | McLeod Center (3,346); Cedar Falls, IA |
| Feb 17, 2018; 5:00 pm, ESPN2 | | at Illinois State | L 75–79 | 13–15 (5–11) | Redbird Arena (6,535); Normal, IL |
| Feb 20, 2018; 8:00 pm, CBSSN | | at Valparaiso | W 68–63 | 14–15 (6–11) | Athletics–Recreation Center (2,071); Valparaiso, IN |
| Feb 24, 2018; 3:00 pm, ESPN3 | | Missouri State | W 71–56 | 15–15 (7–11) | McLeod Center (4,834); Cedar Falls, IA |
Missouri Valley tournament
| Mar 1, 2018; 6:00 pm, ESPN3 | (9) | vs. (8) Evansville; First round | W 60–50 | 16–15 | Scottrade Center (4,852); St. Louis, MO |
| Mar 2, 2018; 12:00 pm, ESPN3 | (9) | vs. (1) Loyola–Chicago; Quarterfinals | L 50–54 | 16–16 | Scottrade Center (6,410); St. Louis, MO |
*Non-conference game. ^{#}Rankings from AP Poll. (#) Tournament seedings in parentheses. All times are in Central Time.

Panther Sports Network (PSN) Cedar Falls Utilities Ch. 15/HD415; KCRG-TV Ch. 9.2; WHO-DT Ch. 13.2; KGCW Ch. 26, Time Warner Cable KC Channel 324, (NBC Sports Chicago or NBCSC+)
