= 2017–18 Bradley Braves men's basketball team =

American college basketball season

2017–18 Bradley Braves men's basketball
- Conference: Missouri Valley Conference
- Record: 20–13 (9–9 MVC)
- Head coach: Brian Wardle (3rd season)
- Assistant coaches: Drew Adams; Mike Bargen; Jimmie Foster
- Home arena: Carver Arena

2017–18 Missouri Valley Conference men's basketball standings
	Conf.				Overall
Team	W		L	PCT	W		L	PCT
Loyola Chicago †	15	–	3	.833	32	–	6	.842
Southern Illinois	11	–	7	.611	20	–	13	.606
Illinois State	10	–	8	.556	18	–	15	.545
Drake	10	–	8	.556	17	–	17	.500
Bradley	9	–	9	.500	20	–	13	.606
Indiana State	8	–	10	.444	13	–	18	.419
Missouri State	7	–	11	.389	18	–	15	.545
Evansville	7	–	11	.389	17	–	15	.531
Northern Iowa	7	–	11	.389	16	–	16	.500
Valparaiso	6	–	12	.333	15	–	17	.469
† 2018 MVC tournament winner

The 2017–18 Bradley Braves men's basketball team represented Bradley University during the 2017–18 NCAA Division I men's basketball season. The Braves, led by third-year head coach Brian Wardle, played their home games at Carver Arena in Peoria, Illinois as members of the Missouri Valley Conference. They finished the season 20–13, 9–9 in MVC play to finish in fifth place. They defeated Drake in the first round of the MVC tournament before losing to Loyola–Chicago in the quarterfinals.

== Previous season ==
The Braves finished the 2016–17 season 13–20, 7–11 in MVC play to finish in a tie for sixth place. As the No. 7 seed in the MVC tournament, they defeated Drake in the first round before losing to Wichita State in the quarterfinals.

== Offseason ==
=== Departures ===
Name	Number	Pos.	Height	Weight	Year	Hometown	Reason for departure
Lou Griffith	0	G	5'9"	155	Freshman	Washington, IL	Walk-on; transferred to Lincoln
Ronnie Suggs	2	G	6'6"	190	Sophomore	Washington, MO	Transferred to Missouri
Jerome Merritt	20	F	6'5"	210	Freshman	Houston, TX	Transferred to College of Central Florida
Alex Foster	34	F	6'8"	230	RS Junior	Joliet, IL	Transferred to Albany

=== Incoming transfers ===
Name	Number	Pos.	Height	Weight	Year	Hometown	Previous School
Luqman Lundy	2	G	6'4"	200	Junior	Newark, NJ	Junior college transferred from Northern Oklahoma College

=== 2017 recruiting class ===
College recruiting information
Name	Hometown	School	Height	Weight	Commit date
Elijah Childs; SF	Lee's Summit, MO	Lee's Summit West High School	6 ft 7 in (2.01 m)	205 lb (93 kg)	Aug 16, 2016
Elijah Childs; SF	Recruit ratings: Scout: Rivals: 247Sports: (N/A)				
Ryan Stipanovich; SF	Saint Louis, MO	De Smet Jesuit High School	6 ft 5 in (1.96 m)	180 lb (82 kg)	Aug 16, 2016
Ryan Stipanovich; SF	Recruit ratings: Scout: Rivals: 247Sports: (N/A)				
Overall recruit ranking: Scout: – Rivals: –
Note: In many cases, Scout, Rivals, 247Sports, On3, and ESPN may conflict in their listings of height and weight.; In these cases, the average was taken. ESPN grades are on a 100-point scale.; Sources: "Bradley Commit List for 2017". Rivals.; "Men's Basketball Recruiting". Scout.; "ESPN – Bradley Braves Basketball Recruiting 2017". ESPN.; "Scout.com Team Recruiting Rankings". Scout.; "2017 Team Ranking". Rivals.

== Preseason ==
In the conference's preseason poll, the Braves were picked to finish in seventh place in the MVC. Sophomore guard Darrell Brown was named to the preseason All-MVC second team.

== Roster ==
2017–18 Bradley Braves men's basketball team
Players
Coaches

Pos.	#	Name	Height	Weight	Year	Previous school	Hometown
F	1	Donte Thomas	6 ft 7 in (2.01 m)	225 lb (102 kg)	Sr	Thornwood HS	Calumet City, IL
G	2	Luqman Lundy	6 ft 3 in (1.91 m)	200 lb (91 kg)	Jr	Mays HS; Northern Oklahoma College	Edgewater, NJ
G	3	Antoine Pittman	6 ft 3 in (1.91 m)	210 lb (95 kg)	Jr	Auburn HS	Rockford, IL
G	5	Darrell Brown	5 ft 10 in (1.78 m)	190 lb (86 kg)	So	Germantown HS	Memphis, TN
F	10	Elijah Childs	6 ft 7 in (2.01 m)	220 lb (100 kg)	Fr	Lee's Summit West HS	Kansas City, MO
C	12	Koch Bar	6 ft 11 in (2.11 m)	230 lb (104 kg)	So	Arlington County Day School, FL	Abyei, South Sudan
F	13	Luuk van Bree	6 ft 9 in (2.06 m)	225 lb (102 kg)	Jr	Canarias Basketball Academy	Venray, Netherlands
F	14	Peter Hanley (W)	6 ft 7 in (2.01 m)	225 lb (102 kg)	Jr	Notre Dame HS	Peoria, IL
G/F	21	Ryan Stipanovich	6 ft 7 in (2.01 m)	210 lb (95 kg)	Fr	De Smet Jesuit HS	St. Louis, MO
G	23	Dwayne Lautier-Ogunleye	6 ft 4 in (1.93 m)	210 lb (95 kg)	Jr	Bristol Academy Flyers	London, England
G	24	JoJo McGlaston	6 ft 5 in (1.96 m)	205 lb (93 kg)	RS Sr	Dublin HS; Diablo Valley College	Dublin, CA
G	25	Nate Kennell	6 ft 6 in (1.98 m)	205 lb (93 kg)	So	Metamora Township HS	Metamora, IL
F	30	Callum Barker	6 ft 9 in (2.06 m)	235 lb (107 kg)	Jr	Notre Dame Prep	Hobart, Australia
G	35	Jayden Hodgson	6 ft 3 in (1.91 m)	200 lb (91 kg)	So	UCSSC Lake Ginninderra	Gosford, Australia

Head coach

- Brian Wardle (Marquette)

Assistant coach(es)

- Drew Adams (Tennessee)
- Mike Bargen (Marquette)
- Jimmie Foster (South Dakota)

Legend

- (C) Team captain
- (S) Suspended
- (I) Ineligible
- (W) Walk-on
- Injured
- Current redshirt

Roster

== Schedule and results ==
Date time, TV	Rank^{#}	Opponent^{#}	Result	Record	High points	High rebounds	High assists	Site (attendance) city, state
Exhibition
Oct 26, 2017*; 7:00 pm		Lewis	W 71–58		12 – Brown	6 – Childs	6 – Brown	Renaissance Coliseum; Peoria, IL
Nov 1, 2017*; 7:00 pm		Robert Morris (IL)	W 87–57		17 – Lautier-Ogunleye	8 – Childs	4 – Tied	Carver Arena (4,248); Peoria, IL
Non-conference regular season
Nov 11, 2017*; 1:00 pm, ESPN3		IUPUI	W 68–53	1–0	19 – Kennell	11 – Lautier-Ogunleye	4 – Tied	Carver Arena (4,936); Peoria, IL
Nov 14, 2017*; 7:00 pm, ESPN3		Delaware	W 61–53	2–0	15 – Van Bree	10 – Thomas	3 – Tied	Carver Arena (4,556); Peoria, IL
Nov 17, 2017*; 10:00 am		vs. Vermont; The Islands of the Bahamas Showcase quarterfinals	L 64–65	2–1	12 – 3 tied	11 – Childs	3 – Lautier-Oguenleye	Kendal Isaacs Gymnasium (334); Nassau, Bahamas
Nov 18, 2017*; 10:00 am		vs. UTSA; The Islands of the Bahamas Showcase consolation round	W 71–69	3–1	18 – Thomas	7 – Tied	3 – Tied	Kendal Isaacs Gymnasium (247); Nassau, Bahamas
Nov 19, 2017*; 1:00 pm		vs. Weber State; The Islands of the Bahamas Showcase 5th-place game	W 70–64	4–1	23 – Brown	8 – Thomas	3 – 3 tied	Kendal Isaacs Gymnasium (312); Nassau, Bahamas
Nov 22, 2017*; 7:00 pm, ESPN3		Missouri S&T; The Islands of the Bahamas Showcase campus game	W 79–47	5–1	18 – Kennell	8 – Tied	7 – Brown	Carver Arena (4,655); Peoria, IL
Nov 25, 2017*; 1:00 pm, ESPN3		Georgia Southern	W 62–57	6–1	19 – Brown	14 – Bar	3 – Tied	Carver Arena (4,670); Peoria, IL
Dec 1, 2017*; 7:00 pm, NBCSC+		Eastern Illinois	W 67–56	7–1	14 – Childs	10 – Lautier-Oguenleye	4 – Brown	Carver Arena (5,275); Peoria, IL
Dec 3, 2017*; 5:00 pm, STADIUM		at San Diego State; MW–MVC Challenge	W 75–52	7–2	12 – Brown	7 – Childs	2 – 3 tied	Viejas Arena (11,102); San Diego, CA
Dec 13, 2017*; 7:00 pm, ESPN3		Little Rock	W 86–46	8–2	12 – Thomas	6 – Van Bree	5 – Brown	Carver Arena (4,670); Peoria, IL
Dec 16, 2017*; 2:05 pm		at Chicago State	W 84–58	9–2	15 – Van Bree	6 – Thomas	10 – Brown	Dickens Athletic Center (750); Chicago, IL
Dec 20, 2017*; 1:00 pm		at Southeast Missouri State	W 75–67	10–2	18 – Brown	6 – 4 tied	5 – Kennell	Show Me Center (702); Cape Girardeau, MO
Dec 22, 2017*; 6:00 pm		at Ole Miss	W 82–59	10–3	16 – Brown	6 – 3 tied	5 – Brown	The Pavilion at Ole Miss (7,993); Oxford, MS
Missouri Valley Conference regular season
Dec 28, 2017; 7:00 pm, ESPN3		at Drake	W 66–64	10–4 (0–1)	19 – Brown	8 – Childs	2 – 3 tied	Knapp Center (2,611); Des Moines, IA
Dec 31, 2018; 1:00 pm, ESPN3		Northern Iowa	W 72–53	11–4 (1–1)	24 – Brown	10 – Thomas	5 – Tied	Carver Arena (5,684); Peoria, IL
Jan 3, 2018; 7:00 pm, ESPN3		Valparaiso	W 80–71	12–4 (2–1)	19 – Thomas	14 – Lautier-Oguenleye	7 – Brown	Carver Arena (5,294); Peoria, IL
Jan 6, 2018; 3:00 pm, ESPN3		at Evansville	L 44–68	12–5 (2–2)	12 – Thomas	4 – 4 tied	3 – Kennell	Ford Center (4,171); Evansville, IN
Jan 9, 2018; 7:00 pm, ESPN3		Southern Illinois	W 68–62	13–5 (3–2)	22 – Thomas	7 – Thomas	5 – Brown	Carver Arena (5,319); Peoria, IL
Jan 13, 2018; 3:00 pm, FSMW/NBCSC		at Loyola	W 81–65	13–6 (3–3)	15 – Brown	7 – Thomas	5 – Tied	Joseph J. Gentile Arena (2,814); Chicago, IL
Jan 17, 2018; 6:00 pm, FSMW/NBCSC		at Illinois State; I-74 Rivalry	L 57–70	13–7 (3–4)	13 – Tied	13 – Thomas	6 – Brown	Redbird Arena (6,321); Bloomington, IL
Jan 20, 2018; 7:00 pm, ESPN3		Evansville	W 66–53	14–7 (4–4)	17 – Brown	12 – Thomas	4 – Lautier-Oguenleye	Carver Arena (6,285); Peoria, IL
Jan 23, 2018; 7:00 pm, ESPN3		Missouri State	W 72–52	15–7 (5–4)	20 – Brown	12 – Childs	8 – Brown	Carver Arena (5,041); Peoria, IL
Jan 28, 2018; 1:00 pm, ESPN3		at Indiana State	W 81–73	16–7 (6–4)	25 – Kennell	7 – Childs	8 – Brown	Hulman Center (4,516); Terre Haute, IN
Jan 31, 2018; 7:00 pm, FSMW/NBCSC		Loyola	W 69–67	17–7 (7–4)	18 – Childs	7 – Childs	8 – Tied	Carver Arena (5,753); Peoria, IL
Feb 3, 2018; 7:00 pm, ESPN3		Drake	L 68–78	17–8 (7–5)	20 – Brown	12 – Thomas	8 – Brown	Carver Arena (7,793); Peoria, IL
Feb 7, 2018; 7:00 pm, ESPN3		at Northern Iowa	L 65–74	17–9 (7–6)	19 – Lautier-Ogunleye	6 – Kennell	2 – Tied	McLeod Center (4,564); Cedar Falls, IA
Feb 11, 2018; 3:00 pm, ESPN3		at Southern Illinois	L 57–74	17–10 (7–7)	21 – Pippen	8 – Pippen	4 – Lautier-Ogunleye	SIU Arena (4,830); Carbondale, IL
Feb 14, 2018; 7:00 pm, ESPN3		Illinois State; I-74 Rivalry	W 70–58	18–10 (8–7)	14 – Thomas	10 – Thomas	6 – Lautier-Ogunleye	Carver Arena (7,731); Peoria, IL
Feb 17, 2018; 8:00 pm, FSNW/NBCSC		at Valparaiso	L 64–77	18–11 (8–8)	19 – Thomas	19 – thomas	3 – Lautier-Ogunleye	Athletics–Recreation Center (3,021); Valparaiso, IN
Feb 21, 2018; 7:00 pm, FSNW/NBCSC		Missouri State	W 82–78	19–11 (9–8)	20 – Kennell	7 – Thomas	4 – Brown	JQH Arena (4,504); Springfield, MO
Feb 24, 2018; 3:00 pm, CBSSN		Indiana State	L 64–66	19–12 (9–9)	24 – Thomas	8 – Thomas	7 – Lautier-Ogunleye	Carver Arena (7,827); Peoria, IL
Missouri Valley tournament
Mar 2, 2018; 2:30 pm, ESPN3	(5)	vs. (4) Drake; Quarterfinals	W 63–61	20–12	24 – Brown	7 – Thomas	2 – 5 tied	Scottrade Center (6,410); St. Louis, MO
Mar 3, 2018; 2:30 pm, CBSSN	(5)	vs. (1) Loyola-Chicago; Semifinals	L 54–62	20–13	12 – 3 tied	7 – Lautier-Ogunleye	3 – Hodgson	Scottrade Center (8,415); St. Louis, MO
*Non-conference game. ^{#}Rankings from AP Poll. (#) Tournament seedings in parentheses. All times are in Central Time.
