= 2017–18 Evansville Purple Aces men's basketball team =

American college basketball season

2017–18 Evansville Purple Aces men's basketball
- Conference: Missouri Valley Conference
- Record: 17–15 (7–11 MVC)
- Head coach: Marty Simmons (11th season)
- Assistant coaches: Doug Novsek; Carson Harris; Kavon Lacey
- Home arena: Ford Center

2017–18 Missouri Valley Conference men's basketball standings
	Conf.				Overall
Team	W		L	PCT	W		L	PCT
Loyola Chicago †	15	–	3	.833	32	–	6	.842
Southern Illinois	11	–	7	.611	20	–	13	.606
Illinois State	10	–	8	.556	18	–	15	.545
Drake	10	–	8	.556	17	–	17	.500
Bradley	9	–	9	.500	20	–	13	.606
Indiana State	8	–	10	.444	13	–	18	.419
Missouri State	7	–	11	.389	18	–	15	.545
Evansville	7	–	11	.389	17	–	15	.531
Northern Iowa	7	–	11	.389	16	–	16	.500
Valparaiso	6	–	12	.333	15	–	17	.469
† 2018 MVC tournament winner

The 2017–18 Evansville Purple Aces men's basketball team represented the University of Evansville during the 2017–18 NCAA Division I men's basketball season. The Purple Aces, led by 11th-year head coach Marty Simmons, played their home games at the Ford Center in Evansville, Indiana as members of the Missouri Valley Conference (MVC). They finished the season 17–15, 7–11 in MVC play to finish in a three-way tie for seventh place. As the No. 8 seed in the MVC tournament, they lost to Northern Iowa in the first round.

On March 13, 2018, Evansville fired head coach Marty Simmons. He finished at Evansville with an 11-year record of 184–175. On March 22, the school hired Boston Celtics assistant coach, former Kentucky player and Evansville native Walter McCarty as head coach.

== Previous season ==
The Purple Aces finished the 2016–17 season 16–17, 6–12 to finish in eighth place in MVC play. They defeated Indiana State in the MVC tournament before losing to Illinois State in the quarterfinals.

== Offseason ==
=== Departures ===
Name	Number	Pos.	Height	Weight	Year	Hometown	Reason for departure
Christian Benzon	2	G	6' 4"	195	Senior	Copenhagen, Denmark	Graduated
Jaylon Brown	3	G	6' 0"	185	Senior	Fishers, IN	Graduated
Jaiveon Eaves	4	G	6' 2"	200	Freshman	Madisonville, KY	Transferred to John A. Logan College
Sergej Vucetic	14	C	7' 1"	238	RS Senior	Vrbas, Serbia	Graduated
Willie Wiley	23	F	6' 7"	215	Senior	Springfield, IL	Graduated
David Howard	44	F	6' 8"	225	RS Senior	Nashville, TN	Graduated

=== Incoming transfers ===
Name	Number	Pos.	Height	Weight	Year	Hometown	Notes
Marty Hill	1	G	6' 5"	170	Junior	Champlin, MN	Junior college transferred from Northeast CC

=== 2017 recruiting class ===
College recruiting information
Name	Hometown	School	Height	Weight	Commit date
Evan Kuhlman; PF	Liberty Township, OH	Lakota East High School	6 ft 6 in (1.98 m)	N/A	Sep 12, 2016
Evan Kuhlman; PF	Recruit ratings: Scout: Rivals: (NR)				
Noah Frederking; SG	Okawville, IL	Okawville High School	6 ft 4 in (1.93 m)	195 lb (88 kg)	Oct 22, 2016
Noah Frederking; SG	Recruit ratings: Scout: Rivals: (NR)				
Overall recruit ranking:
Note: In many cases, Scout, Rivals, 247Sports, On3, and ESPN may conflict in their listings of height and weight.; In these cases, the average was taken. ESPN grades are on a 100-point scale.; Sources: "2017 Team Ranking". Rivals.

== Preseason ==
In the conference's preseason poll, the Aces were picked to finish in ninth place in the MVC. Junior guard Ryan Taylor was named to the preseason All-MVC second team.

== Roster ==
2017–18 Evansville Purple Aces men's basketball team
Players
Coaches

Pos.	#	Name	Height	Weight	Year	Previous school	Hometown
G	0	Ryan Taylor	6 ft 6 in (1.98 m)	195 lb (88 kg)	RS Jr	St. John's Northwestern Military Academy; Ohio	Gary, IN
G	1	Marty Hill	6 ft 5 in (1.96 m)	180 lb (82 kg)	Jr	Champlin Park; Northeast CC	Brooklyn Park, MN
F	5	Solomon Hainna	6 ft 6 in (1.98 m)	195 lb (88 kg)	RS Sr	Palisades Charter; Midland College	Inglewood, CA
F	10	Evan Kuhlman	6 ft 8 in (2.03 m)	220 lb (100 kg)	Fr	Lakota East	Liberty Township, OH
G	12	Dru Smith	6 ft 3 in (1.91 m)	190 lb (86 kg)	So	Reitz	Evansville, IN
F	14	Dainius Chatkevicius	6 ft 9 in (2.06 m)	240 lb (109 kg)	RS Jr	West Oaks Academy; Vincennes	Klaipėda, Lithuania
C	15	Dalen Traore	6 ft 9 in (2.06 m)	230 lb (104 kg)	Sr	Northwood Temple Academy; Miami Dade College	Ivory Coast
G	25	Duane Gibson	6 ft 3 in (1.91 m)	195 lb (88 kg)	RS Sr	Villa Angela-St. Joseph	Cleveland, OH
G	30	Noah Frederking	6 ft 4 in (1.93 m)	210 lb (95 kg)	Fr	Okawville	Okawville, IL
G	33	K. J. Riley	6 ft 5 in (1.96 m)	190 lb (86 kg)	So	Standard of Excellence; Howard College	The Bronx, NY
F	35	John Hall	6 ft 7 in (2.01 m)	215 lb (98 kg)	RS Fr	Standard of Excellence	Philadelphia, PA
G/F	50	Blake Simmons	6 ft 5 in (1.96 m)	210 lb (95 kg)	RS Sr	Castle	Newburgh, IN

Head coach

- Marty Simmons (Evansville)

Assistant coach(es)

- Doug Novsek (Southern Illinois)
- Carson Harris (Manchester (IN))
- Kavon Lacey (Evansville)

Legend

- (C) Team captain
- (S) Suspended
- (I) Ineligible
- (W) Walk-on
- Injured
- Current redshirt

Roster
Last update: February 21, 2025

== Schedule and results ==
Date time, TV	Rank^{#}	Opponent^{#}	Result	Record	Site (attendance) city, state
Non-conference regular season
November 10, 2017*; 7:00 p.m., ESPN3		Arkansas State	W 77–63	1–0	Ford Center (3,622); Evansville, IN
November 13, 2017*; 11:00 a.m., ESPN3		North Carolina Central	W 68–55	2–0	Ford Center (6,048); Evansville, IN
November 16, 2017*; 7:00 p.m., ESPN3		Southeast Missouri State; Cancún Challenge campus game	W 66–50	3–0	Ford Center (3,151); Evansville, IN
November 18, 2017*; 3:00 p.m., ESPN3		Binghamton; Cancún Challenge campus game	W 66–61	4–0	Ford Center (3,167); Evansville, IN
November 21, 2017*; 7:30 p.m., CBSSN		vs. Fresno State; Cancún Challenge semifinals	W 59–57	5–0	Hard Rock Hotel Riviera Maya (982); Cancún, Mexico
November 22, 2017*; 7:30 p.m., CBSSN		vs. Louisiana Tech; Cancún Challenge championship	L 61–63	5–1	Hard Rock Hotel Riviera Maya (982); Cancún, Mexico
November 29, 2017*; 8:00 p.m., ATTSNRM		at New Mexico; MW–MVC Challenge	L 59–78	5–2	Dreamstyle Arena (8,943); Albuquerque, NM
December 2, 2017*; 1:00 p.m., ESPN3		Oakland City	W 98–56	6–2	Ford Center (3,213); Evansville, IN
December 5, 2017*; 6:00 p.m., ESPN3		at Bowling Green	W 91–76	7–2	Stroh Center (1,489); Bowling Green, OH
December 9, 2017*; 1:00 p.m., ESPN3		Canisius	W 65–58	8–2	Ford Center (3,363); Evansville, IN
December 16, 2017*; 3:00 p.m., ESPN3		Austin Peay	W 78–74 ^{OT}	9–2	Ford Center (3,403); Evansville, IN
December 17, 2017*; 3:00 p.m., ESPN3		Midway	W 79–52	10–2	Ford Center (3,010); Evansville, IN
December 20, 2017*; 6:00 p.m., ESPN2		at No. 4 Duke	L 40–104	10–3	Cameron Indoor Stadium (9,314); Durham, NC
Missouri Valley regular season
December 23, 2017; 1:00 p.m., NBCSC		Illinois State	L 66–72	10–4 (0–1)	Ford Center (4,039); Evansville, IN
December 30, 2017; 3:00 p.m., FSMW/NBCSC		at Loyola–Chicago	L 59–66	10–5 (0–2)	Joseph J. Gentile Arena (1,914); Chicago, IL
January 3, 2018; 7:00 p.m., ESPN3		at Southern Illinois	L 63–65	10–6 (0–3)	SIU Arena (4,622); Carbondale, IL
January 6, 2018; 3:00 p.m., ESPN3		Bradley	W 68–44	11–6 (1–3)	Ford Center (4,171); Evansville, IN
January 10, 2018; 7:00 p.m., ESPN3		Missouri State	W 64–55	12–6 (2–3)	Ford Center (3,237); Evansville, IN
January 13, 2018; 2:00 p.m., ESPN3		at Drake	L 65–81	12–7 (2–4)	Knapp Center (3,313); Des Moines, IA
January 17, 2018; 7:00 p.m., ESPN3		Indiana State	L 66–71	12–8 (2–5)	Ford Center (3,601); Evansville, IN
January 20, 2018; 7:00 p.m., ESPN3		at Bradley	L 53–66	12–9 (2–6)	Carver Arena (6,205); Peoria, IL
January 24, 2018; 7:00 p.m., ESPN3		at Valparaiso	W 75–65	13–9 (3–6)	Athletics–Recreation Center (2,219); Valparaiso, IN
January 27, 2018; 1:00 p.m., ESPN3		Drake	W 77–73	14–9 (4–6)	Ford Center (4,295); Evansville, IN
January 31, 2018; 7:00 p.m., ESPN3		at Northern Iowa	W 57–49	15–9 (5–6)	Ford Center (3,352); Evansville, IN
February 3, 2018; 3:00 p.m., ESPN3		at Illinois State	L 71–75	16–9 (5–7)	Redbird Arena (6,923); Normal, IL
February 7, 2018; 7:00 p.m., ESPn3		Valparaiso	W 63–59	16–10 (6–7)	Ford Center (3,425); Evansville, IN
February 10, 2018; 2:00 p.m.		at Missouri State	L 55–72	16–11 (6–8)	JQH Arena (3,358); Springfield, MO
February 13, 2018; 7:00 p.m., ESPN3		at Northern Iowa	L 41–47	16–12 (6–9)	McLeod Center (3,346); Cedar Falls, IA
February 18, 2018; 3:00 p.m., ESPN3		Loyola–Chicago	L 66–76	16–13 (6–10)	Ford Center (4,887); Evansville, IN
February 21, 2018; 6:00 p.m., ESPN3		at Indiana State	L 53–58	16–14 (6–11)	Hulman Center (4,295); Terre Haute, IN
February 24, 2018; 1:00 p.m., ESPN3		Southern Illinois	W 75–44	17–14 (7–11)	Ford Center (4,312); Evansville, IN
Missouri Valley tournament
March 1, 2018; 6:00 p.m., ESPN3	(8)	vs. (9) Northern Iowa; First round	L 50–60	17–15	Scottrade Center (4,852); St. Louis, MO
*Non-conference game. ^{#}Rankings from AP poll. (#) Tournament seedings in parentheses. All times are in Central.
