= Paul Lusk =

American men's college basketball coach (born 1971)

Current position
- Title: Assistant coach
- Team: Purdue
- Conference: Big Ten

Biographical details
- Born: November 14, 1971 (age 54)

Playing career
- 1991–1992: Iowa
- 1993–1995: Southern Illinois
- Position: Point guard

Coaching career (HC unless noted)
- 1996–1997: Southwestern Illinois (assistant)
- 1999–2002: Missouri Southern (assistant)
- 2002–2003: Dubuque
- 2003–2004: Southern Illinois (assistant)
- 2004–2011: Purdue (assistant)
- 2011–2018: Missouri State
- 2018–2021: Creighton (assistant)
- 2021–present: Purdue (assistant)

Head coaching record
- Overall: 106–121 (.467)
- Tournaments: 0–1 (CIT)

Accomplishments and honors

Awards
- Second Team All-MVC (1994)

Paul Lusk (born November 14, 1971) is an American men's basketball coach and former point guard, who is a current assistant men's basketball coach for the Purdue Boilermakers. He played college basketball at Iowa from 1991 to 1993 before transferring to Southern Illinois where he played from 1993 to 1995 for head coach Rich Herrin. He then served as the head coach of the Missouri State Bears (2011–2018).

== Playing career ==
A native of New Baden, Illinois, Lusk played high school basketball at Trenton (Wesclin) high school, leading the Warriors to the 1990 Class A state title with an 83–78, 2OT win over top-ranked Fairbury (Prairie Central). Lusk originally committed to the University of Iowa, but suffered a broken leg in his freshman year with the Hawkeyes and later transferred to Southern Illinois University where he played under longtime head coach Rich Herrin.

== Coaching career ==
=== Dubuque ===
Lusk was hired in 2002 as the head men's basketball coach at the University of Dubuque in Dubuque, Iowa. He held this job for only one year, the 2002-2003 season. During this season, he was able to win only two games, and finished the season with 2 wins and 23 losses. His team finished last in the conference with a record of 1 win and 17 losses. (archive) https://udspartans.com/sports/2023/12/1/mens-basketball-record-book.aspx

=== Purdue ===
Lusk was an assistant at Purdue University from 2004 to 2011 under legendary coach Gene Keady and Matt Painter.

=== Missouri State ===
Lusk was introduced as the new coach at Missouri State University on Friday, April 1, 2011, replacing longtime friend, Cuonzo Martin after he left for the head coaching position at Tennessee. In his first season as a head coach, the Bears entered the year with strong expectations and returned Missouri Valley Player of the Year, Kyle Weems. The team would go on to hold a 15–16 record. A major highlight of the season was a road victory over 21st-ranked Creighton in the opening game of conference play.

In Lusk's second season as head coach, with a roster including six freshmen and only one returning senior, the Bears were the youngest team in the Missouri Valley Conference and one of the youngest in the nation. Struggling early in the season the Bears went 0–10 against Division I programs, only gaining 2 wins in their first 12 games against Division II teams. The Bears registered their first win over a Division I team on December 30, beating Southern Illinois University 70–59.

He was fired from Missouri State on March 3, 2018.

=== Creighton ===
Following his firing from Missouri State, Lusk joined the coaching staff of Greg McDermott at Creighton.

=== Return to Purdue ===
On April 12, 2021, Lusk returned to Painter's staff at Purdue.

== Head coaching record ==
Record table
Season	Team	Overall	Conference	Standing	Postseason
Missouri State (Missouri Valley) (2011–2018)
2011–12	Missouri State	16–16	9–9	T–3rd	
2012–13	Missouri State	11–22	7–11	T–8th	
2013–14	Missouri State	20–13	9–9	T–4th	CIT First Round
2014–15	Missouri State	11–20	5–13	8th	
2015–16	Missouri State	13–19	8–10	T–6th	
2016–17	Missouri State	17–16	7–11	T–6th	
2017–18	Missouri State	18–15	7–11	T–7th	
Missouri State:		106–121 (.467)	51–75 (.405)		
Total:		106–121 (.467)			
National champion Postseason invitational champion Conference regular season champion Conference regular season and conference tournament champion Division regular season champion Division regular season and conference tournament champion Conference tournament champion
