= Elijah Childs =

American basketball player (born 1999)

- Childs with Heidelberg in 2024

No. 4 – Mykonos
- Position: Power forward / small forward
- League: Greek Basketball League

Personal information
- Born: January 10, 1999 (age 27)
- Listed height: 6 ft 7 in (2.01 m)
- Listed weight: 225 lb (102 kg)

Career information
- High school: Raytown South (Raytown, Missouri); Lee's Summit West (Lee's Summit, Missouri)
- College: Bradley (2017–2021)
- NBA draft: 2021: undrafted
- Playing career: 2021–present

Career history
- 2021–2022: Pallacanestro Trapani
- 2022–2023: Bakken Bears
- 2023–2024: MHP Riesen Ludwigsburg
- 2024: MLP Academics Heidelberg
- 2024: Pistoia 2000
- 2025–2026: Hapoel HaEmek
- 2026–present: Mykonos

Career highlights
- Danish League champion (2023); 2x Second-team All-MVC (2020, 2021); Third-team All-MVC (2019); MVC tournament MVP (2019)

Elijah Childs (born January 10, 1999) is an American professional basketball player for Mykonos B.C. of the Greek Basketball League. He played college basketball for the Bradley Braves.

== Early life and high school career ==
Growing up, Childs focused on football and baseball. He did not begin playing basketball until eighth grade, when friends recommended he try out as he was already 6'5". Childs attended Raytown South High School before transferring to Lee's Summit West High School. As a junior, he averaged 19 points and 12 rebounds per game, earning All-Conference and All-State recognition. During his senior season, Childs averaged 14.2 points and 10.7 rebounds per game. He was named Suburban Gold Conference player of the year as well was First Team All-Metro by The Kansas City Star. Childs was not highly recruited, receiving offers from Central Arkansas, Indiana State, and Missouri State, before committing to Bradley due to the suggestion of his father.

== College career ==
Childs averaged 8.4 points, 6.2 rebounds and 1.4 blocks per game as a freshman, earning Missouri Valley Conference All-Freshman Team honors. He was named 2019 Missouri Valley Conference tournament MVP after averaging 12.7 points, 7.7 rebounds and 2.0 blocks per game in three games. In the NCAA Tournament, Childs scored 19 points on 9-of-14 shooting and had six rebounds and three blocks in a loss to Michigan State. As a sophomore, he averaged 12.4 points, 7.8 rebounds and 1.4 blocks per game, earning Third Team All-Missouri Valley Conference honors. Childs broke his middle finger in a game against Georgia Southern on December 15, 2019. After sitting out for three weeks, he re-injured it during a game against Northern Iowa, which required surgery.

Childs averaged 14.8 points and 8.6 rebounds per game as a junior. He was named to the Second Team All-Missouri Valley Conference. In February 2021, he was indefinitely suspended due to a violation of program standards, and he missed the rest of the season. It later emerged that he was investigated by the police for sodomy in the second degree.

As a senior, Childs averaged 14.2 points, 8.3 rebounds and 1.3 blocks per game. He was named to the Second Team All-Missouri Valley Conference. Following the season, Childs entered the transfer portal, but ultimately decided to turn professional.

== Professional career ==
On July 26, 2021, Childs signed his first professional contract with Pallacanestro Trapani of the Serie A2 Basket.

On July 14, 2022, he signed with Bakken Bears of the Basketligaen.

On July 14, 2023, he signed with MHP Riesen Ludwigsburg of the Basketball Bundesliga.

On July 2, 2024, he signed with Pistoia 2000 of the Lega Basket Serie A (LBA).

On June 21, 2026, he signed with Mykonos B.C. of the Greek Basketball League (GBL).

== Career statistics ==
Legend
GP	Games played	GS	Games started	MPG	Minutes per game
FG%	Field goal percentage	3P%	3-point field goal percentage	FT%	Free throw percentage
RPG	Rebounds per game	APG	Assists per game	SPG	Steals per game
BPG	Blocks per game	PPG	Points per game	**Bold**	Career high

=== College ===
Year	Team	GP	GS	MPG	FG%	3P%	FT%	RPG	APG	SPG	BPG	PPG
2017–18	Bradley	33	12	20.9	**.502**	.280	.537	6.2	.6	.7	**1.4**	8.4
2018–19	Bradley	**35**	**34**	29.5	.471	.236	.659	7.8	1.0	.8	**1.4**	12.4
2019–20	Bradley	22	22	30.0	.498	.212	**.711**	**8.6**	**1.1**	.4	**1.4**	**14.8**
2020–21	Bradley	22	22	**31.2**	.476	**.355**	.700	8.3	1.0	**.9**	1.3	14.2
Career		112	90	27.4	.484	.264	.647	7.6	.9	.7	1.4	12.1

== Personal life ==
Childs is the son of Keisha Cook and Daron Childs. His mother is a nurse while his father works on the assembly line at Ford Motors. Childs has two older siblings, Markevian and Robert Cornelius; a fraternal twin Isaiah, and a younger brother Daron Jr. He studied communications at Bradley.
