= 2009–10 New Mexico Lobos men's basketball team =

American college basketball season

2009–10 New Mexico Lobos men's basketball

Mountain West regular season champions

NCAA tournament, second round
- Conference: Mountain West Conference

Ranking
- Coaches: No. 16
- AP: No. 8
- Record: 30–5 (14–2 Mountain West)
- Head coach: Steve Alford (3rd season)
- Assistant coaches: Craig Neal; Wyking Jones; Ryan Miller
- Home arena: The Pit (14,586)

2009–10 Mountain West Conference men's basketball standings
	Conf.				Overall
Team	W		L	PCT	W		L	PCT
No. 8 New Mexico	14	–	2	.875	30	–	5	.857
No. 17 BYU	13	–	3	.813	30	–	6	.833
UNLV	11	–	5	.688	25	–	8	.758
San Diego State†	11	–	5	.688	25	–	9	.735
Colorado State	7	–	9	.438	16	–	16	.500
Utah	7	–	9	.438	14	–	17	.452
TCU	5	–	11	.313	13	–	19	.406
Wyoming	3	–	13	.188	10	–	21	.323
Air Force	1	–	15	.063	10	–	21	.323
† Conference tournament winner As of March 20, 2010; Rankings from AP/Coaches Poll

The 2009–10 New Mexico Lobos men's basketball team represented the University of New Mexico as a member of the Mountain West Conference. The Lobos were coached by third-year head coach Steve Alford and played their home games at The Pit, newly renamed from its previous official name of University Arena, in Albuquerque, New Mexico.

The Lobos finished the season 30–5, 14–2 in Mountain West play to capture the regular season championship. They advanced to the semifinals of the 2010 Mountain West Conference men's basketball tournament before being defeated by eventual champion San Diego State. They received an at–large bid to the 2010 NCAA Division I men's basketball tournament, earning a 3 seed in the East Region. They defeated 14 seed Montana in the first round before being upset by 11 seed Washington in the second round to end their season.

== 2009–10 University Arena renovations ==
The University of New Mexico Vice President for Athletics Paul Krebs outlined details of the $60 million renovations to University Arena (The Pit). Some of the items included in the presentation were the addition of 60,000 square feet (5,600 m^{2}) of new space, the expansion of the concourse, the addition of 40 luxury suites and 300 club seats to the mezzanine level and the new state-of-the-art locker room facilities for Lobo men's and women's basketball. Krebs stated, "Our goal is to create the best collegiate basketball venue in the nation."

The design process followed the completion of the Program Document for The Pit, which was used to guide the planning and design. The focus of the design, guided by Molzen-Corbin & Associates, was to maintain and improve the fan experience but not change The Pit. The planning committee was charged with keeping The Pit intimate, respecting its history, keeping the mystique of the arena, maintaining great sight lines and the current bowl seating mix and embracing new technology.

The project was expected to be completed in time for the 2010–2011 basketball season. During construction the home games still took place at University Arena and had no impact on the 2009–10 season.

== Roster ==
2009–10 Roster
Name	Number	Pos.	Height	Weight	Year	Hometown	High School/Last College
A.J. Hardeman	00	F	6' 8"	225	Sophomore	Del Valle, Texas	Del Valle High School
Darington Hobson	1	G/F	6' 7"	205	Junior	Las Vegas, Nevada	College of Eastern Utah
Curtis Dennis	3	G	6' 5"	195	Freshman	Bronx, New York	Findlay Prep
Chad Adams	4	G/F	6' 6"	190	Freshman	Albuquerque, New Mexico	Highland High School
Dairese Gary	5	G	6' 1"	205	Junior	Elkhart, Indiana	Concord High School
Kevin Nelson	10	G	6' 0"	175	Freshman	Albuquerque, New Mexico	Albuquerque Academy
Nate Garth	11	G	6' 2"	180	Sophomore	Sacramento, California	Hamilton High School, TN
Jamal Fenton	13	G	5' 9"	170	Freshman	Houston, Texas	Cesar E. Chavez High School
Will Brown	15	F	6' 9"	235	Sophomore	Dallas, Texas	Woodrow Wilson High School
Phillip McDonald	23	G	6' 5"	200	Sophomore	Cypress, Texas	Cypress Springs High School
Román Martínez	30	F	6' 6"	185	Senior	El Paso, Texas	Montwood High School
Matt Staff	41	F	6' 9"	220	Freshman	Houston, Texas	Memorial High School

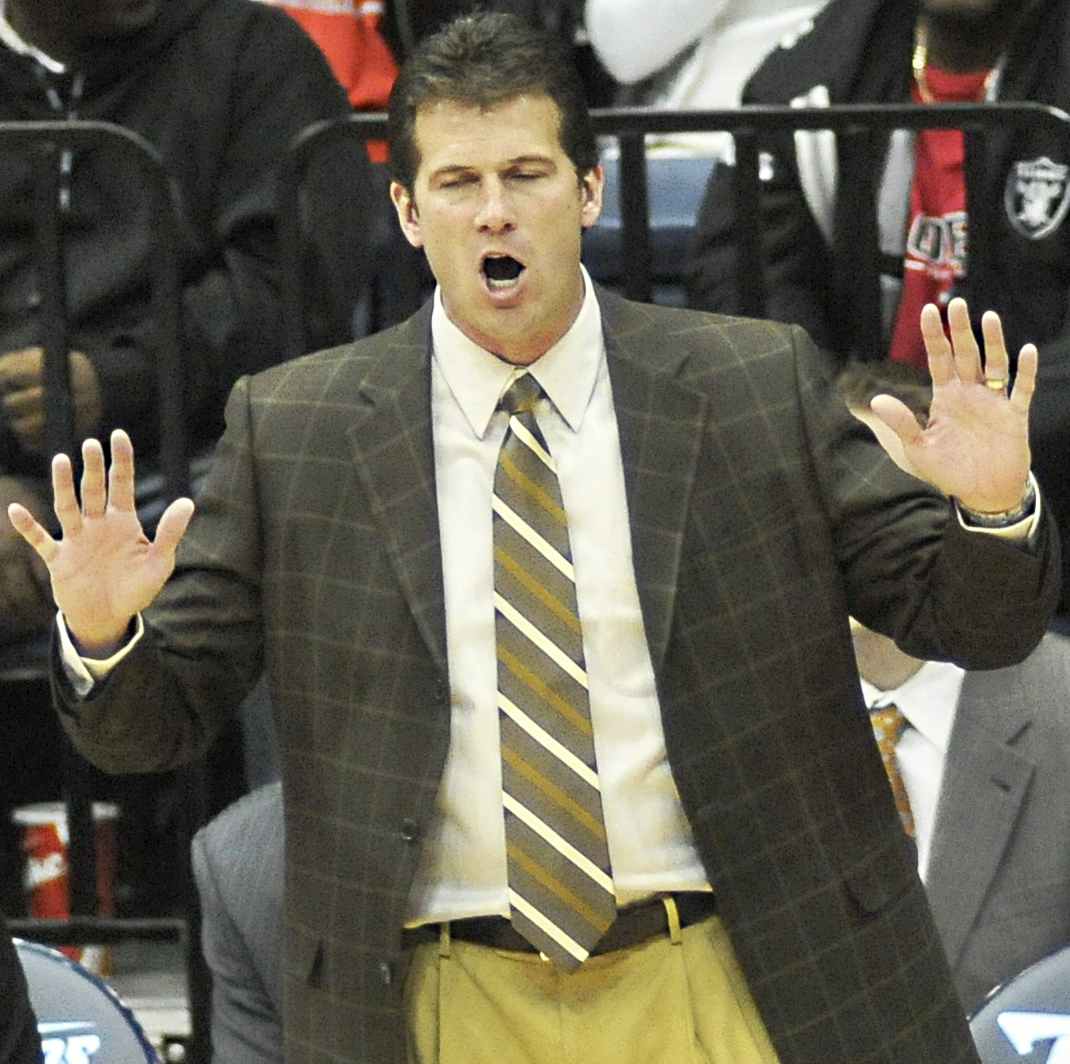
Lobo Coach Steve Alford

== Rankings ==
Ranking movement Legend: ██ Increase in ranking. ██ Decrease in ranking. ██ Not ranked the previous week.
Poll	Pre	Wk 1	Wk 2	Wk 3	Wk 4	Wk 5	Wk 6	Wk 7	Wk 8	Wk 9	Wk 10	Wk 11	Wk 12	Wk 13	Wk 14	Wk 15	Wk 16	Wk 17	Wk 18	Final
AP	NR	NR	NR	NR	NR	19	13	19	15	NR	NR	23	15	15	12	10	8	8	8	
Coaches	NR	NR	NR	NR	NR	17	12	17	14	NR	NR	NR	23	19	15	12	10	8	10	16

== 2009–2010 schedule ==
Date time, TV	Rank^{#}	Opponent^{#}	Result	Record	Site (attendance) city, state
Exhibition
11/03/2009*; 1:00 pm		New Mexico Highlands	W 98–68	—	The Pit (11,465); Albuquerque, NM
Regular season
11/14/2009*; 8:00 pm		UC Riverside	W 67–51	1–0	The Pit (11,871); Albuquerque, NM
11/17/2009*; 7:00 pm, AggieVision		at New Mexico State; Rio Grande Rivalry	W 97–87	2–0	Pan American Center (8,469); Las Cruces, NM
11/20/2009*; 8:35 pm, KASY		Nicholls State; World Vision Classic	W 83–59	3–0	The Pit (11,095); Alnuquerque, NM
11/21/2009*; 8:35 pm, KASY		Louisiana Tech; World Vision Classic	W 81–52	4–0	The Pit (11,311); Albuquerque, NM
11/22/2009*; 6:00 pm, KASY		Miami (OH); World Vision Classic	W 85–60	5–0	The Pit (10,986); Albuquerque, NM
11/27/2009*; 10:05 pm, KASY		at Hawai'i	W 83–71	6–0	Stan Sheriff Center (5,256); Honolulu, HI
12/02/2009*; 7:00 pm, CBSCS		California	W 86–78	7–0	The Pit (13,549); Albuquerque, NM
12/05/2009*; 7:00 pm, The Mtn.		New Mexico State; Rio Grande Rivalry	W 75–58	8–0	The Pit (14,586); Albuquerque, NM
12/09/2009*; 1:00 pm, KASY		at San Diego	W 82–78	9–0	Jenny Craig Pavilion (1,873); San Diego, CA
12/12/2009*; 4:00 pm, FSN		vs. No. 16 Texas A&M	W 84–81	10–0	Toyota Center (7,757); Houston, TX
12/16/2009*; 7:00 pm	No. 19	Northern Arizona	W 96–57	11–0	The Pit (13,091); Albuquerque, NM
12/19/2009*; 7:00 pm, The Mtn.	No. 19	Creighton; MWC–MVC Challenge	W 66–61	12–0	The Pit (14,333); Albuquerque, NM
12/23/2009*; 6:00 pm, KASY	No. 13	at Oral Roberts	L 66–75	12–1	Mabee Center (5,869); Tulsa, OK
12/29/2009*; 7:00 pm, CBSCS	No. 19	No. 20 Texas Tech	W 90–75	13–1	The Pit (14,586); Albuquerque, NM
01/01/2010*; 7:00 pm, The Mtn.	No. 19	Dayton	W 68–66	14–1	The Pit (14,586); Albuquerque, NM
01/05/2010; 8:30 pm, The Mtn.	No. 15	at San Diego State	L 64–74	14–2 (0–1)	Viejas Arena (7,558); San Diego, CA
01/09/2010; 2:00 pm, Versus	No. 15	UNLV	L 62–74	14–3 (0–2)	The Pit (14,586); Albuquerque, NM
01/13/2010; 8:00 pm, The Mtn.		Utah	W 74–57	15–3 (1–2)	The Pit (13,501); Albuquerque, NM
01/16/2010; 1:30 pm, The Mtn.		at Wyoming	W 70–68	16–3 (2–2)	Arena-Auditorium (6,146); Laramie, WY
01/20/2010; 7:00 pm		at Air Force	W 73–50	17–3 (3–2)	Clune Arena (2,156); Colorado Springs, CO
01/23/2010; 1:30 pm, The Mtn.		Colorado State	W 82–64	18–3 (4–2)	The Pit (13,707); Albuquerque, NM
01/27/2010; 8:00 pm, The Mtn.	No. 23	No. 12 BYU	W 76–72	19–3 (5–2)	The Pit (14,586); Albuquerque, NM
01/30/2010; 4:00 pm, CBSCS	No. 23	at TCU	W 73–57	20–3 (6–2)	Daniel-Meyer Coliseum (4,827); Fort Worth, TX
02/06/2010; 4:00 pm, The Mtn.	No. 15	San Diego State	W 88–86 ^{OT}	21–3 (7–2)	The Pit (14,586); Albuquerque, NM
02/10/2010; 9:00 pm, CBSCS	No. 15	at No. 23 UNLV	W 76–66	22–3 (8–2)	Thomas & Mack Center (18,044); Paradise, NV
02/13/2010; 7:00 pm, The Mtn.	No. 15	at Utah	W 68–65 ^{OT}	23–3 (9–2)	Jon M. Huntsman Center (9,933); Salt Lake City, UT
02/17/2010; 7:00 pm, CBSCS	No. 12	Wyoming	W 83–61	24–3 (10–2)	The Pit (14,586); Albuquerque, NM
02/20/2010; 1:30 pm, The Mtn.	No. 12	Air Force	W 59–56	25–3 (11–2)	The Pit (14,586); Albuquerque, NM
02/23/2010; 8:00 pm, The Mtn.	No. 10	at Colorado State	W 72–66	26–3 (12–2)	Moby Arena (4,303); Fort Collins, CO
02/27/2010; 2:00 pm, Versus	No. 10	at No. 13 BYU	W 83–81	27–3 (13–2)	Marriott Center (22,644); Provo, UT
03/03/2010; 6:30 pm, The Mtn.	No. 8	TCU	W 73–66	28–3 (14–2)	The Pit (14,586); Albuquerque, NM
Mountain West tournament
03/11/2010; 2:00 pm, The Mtn.	(1) No. 8	vs. (9) Air Force; MWC Quarterfinals	W 75–69	29–3	Thomas & Mack Center; Paradise, NV
03/12/2010; 8:00 pm, CBSCS	(1) No. 8	vs. (4) San Diego State; MWC Semifinals	L 69–72	29–4	Thomas & Mack Center; Paradise, NV
NCAA tournament
03/18/2010*; 8:45 pm, CBS	(3 E) No. 8	vs. (14 E) Montana; NCAA First Round	W 62–57	30–4	HP Pavilion (15,427); San Jose, CA
03/20/2010*; 3:50 pm, CBS	(3 E) No. 8	vs. (11 E) Washington; NCAA Second Round	L 64–82	30–5	HP Pavilion (16,044); San Jose, CA
*Non-conference game. ^{#}Rankings from AP Poll. (#) Tournament seedings in parentheses. E=NCAA East Region. Source:
