= 2009–10 Air Force Falcons men's basketball team =

American college basketball season

2009–10 Air Force Falcons men's basketball
- Conference: Mountain West Conference
- Record: 10–21 (1–15 Mountain West)
- Head coach: Jeff Reynolds
- Assistant coaches: Dave Pilipovich; Steve Snell; Rob Pryor; Drew Long; Tom Bellairs
- Home arena: Clune Arena

2009–10 Mountain West Conference men's basketball standings
	Conf.				Overall
Team	W		L	PCT	W		L	PCT
No. 8 New Mexico	14	–	2	.875	30	–	5	.857
No. 17 BYU	13	–	3	.813	30	–	6	.833
UNLV	11	–	5	.688	25	–	8	.758
San Diego State†	11	–	5	.688	25	–	9	.735
Colorado State	7	–	9	.438	16	–	16	.500
Utah	7	–	9	.438	14	–	17	.452
TCU	5	–	11	.313	13	–	19	.406
Wyoming	3	–	13	.188	10	–	21	.323
Air Force	1	–	15	.063	10	–	21	.323
† Conference tournament winner As of March 20, 2010; Rankings from AP/Coaches Poll

The 2009–10 Air Force Falcons men's basketball team represented the United States Air Force Academy in the 2009–10 NCAA Division I men's basketball season. Led by third-year coach Jeff Reynolds, the Falcons played their home games at Clune Arena on at the Air Force Academy's main campus in Colorado Springs, Colorado. They finished the season 10–21, with a 1–15 record in Mountain West play, finishing in last place. The Falcons lost in the quarterfinals of the 2010 Mountain West tournament to UNLV.

== Roster ==
#	Name	Height	Weight (lbs.)	Class	Position	Hometown	Previous school
00	Chris Blake	6–7	205	Freshman	Forward	San Antonio, TX	Clark HS
1	Scott Stucky	6–3	185	Junior	Guard	Dublin, OH	Dublin Coffman HS
5	Mike Fitzgerald	6–6	195	Sophomore	Guard/Forward	Centerville, MN	St. Thomas Academy
10	Todd Fletcher	6–2	180	Sophomore	Guard	Lee's Summit, MO	Lee's Summit West HS
12	Ben Matthewson	6-3	180	Sophomore	Guard	San Antonio, TX	Smithson Valley HS
13	Zach Bohannon	6–8	205	Sophomore	Forward	Marion, IA	Linn-Mar HS
14	Michael Lyons	6–6	190	Sophomore	Guard	Newport News, VA	Massanutten Military Acad.
15	Taylor Stewart	6–5	190	Junior	Guard/Forward	Lexington, KY	Lexington Catholic HS
20	Tom Fow	6–6	205	Senior	Forward	Scottsdale, AZ	Notre Dame Prep.
21	Myles Jerrett	6–5	215	Freshman	Forward	Chino Hills, CA	Ayala HS
22	Sean Bowman	6–7	195	Freshman	Forward	Houston, TX	Stratford HS
23	Jamil Bailey	6–4	200	Freshman	Guard	Dallas, TX	Dallas Jesuit Prep
24	Derek Brooks	6–6	200	Senior	Forward	Nathalie, VA	Halifax County HS
25	Kyle Green	6–3	190	Sophomore	Guard	Richland Hills, TX	Richland
30	Adam Brakeville	6–6	210	Sophomore	Guard/Forward	San Clemente, CA	Corona Del Mar HS
32	Shawn Hempsey	6–2	180	Junior	Guard	Encinitas, CA	La Costa Canyon HS
34	Taylor Broekhuis	6–10	210	Sophomore	Center	Colorado Springs, CO	Colorado Springs Christian School
35	Evan Washington	6–4	200	Senior	Guard	Columbus, OH	Reynoldsburg HS
44	Chase Kammerer	6–8	210	Freshman	Forward	Montgomery, TX	St. Thomas HS

== Schedule and results ==
Date time, TV	Rank^{#}	Opponent^{#}	Result	Record	Site (attendance) city, state
Regular season
11/13/2009*; 8:00 pm		Western State	W 65–54	1–0	Clune Arena (2,835); Colorado Springs, CO
11/20/2009*; 8:00 pm		Dickinson State; Air Force Classic	W 95–77	2–0	Clune Arena (2,260); Colorado Springs, CO
11/21/2009*; 8:00 pm		Northern Colorado Bears; Air Force Classic	L 46–70	2–1	Clune Arena (5,858); Colorado Springs, CO
11/28/2009*; 7:00 pm		Charleston Southern	W 68–58 ^{OT}	3–1	Clune Arena (1,728); Colorado Springs, CO
12/02/2009*; 7:00 pm		North Carolina Central	W 61–49	4–1	Clune Arena (1,093); Colorado Springs, CO
12/05/2009*; 6:00 pm		at Missouri State; MWC–MVC Challenge	L 48–58	4–2	JQH Arena (7,524); Springfield, MO
12/08/2009*; 7:00 pm		Prairie View A&M	W 75–41	5–2	Clune Arena (739); Colorado Springs, CO
12/12/2009*; 2:00 pm		vs. Washington State	L 68–75	5–3	Spokane Arena (7,024); Spokane, WA
12/19/2009*; 7:00 pm		Northern Arizona	L 52–60	5–4	Clune Arena (2,507); Colorado Springs, CO
12/22/2009*; 7:00 pm		UC Davis	W 69–57	6–4	Clune Arena (1,922); Colorado Springs, CO
12/28/2009*; 9:00 pm		vs. Niagara; Sun Bowl Invitational semifinals	W 77–71	7–4	Don Haskins Center (6,212); El Paso, TX
12/29/2009*; 7:30 pm		at UTEP; Sun Bowl Invitational championship	L 47–58	7–5	Don Haskins Center (8,010); El Paso, TX
01/06/2010*; 7:00 pm		Texas–Pan American	W 72–65	8–5	Clune Arena (1,748); Colorado Springs, CO
01/05/2010; 7:00 pm, CBSCS		at TCU	L 50–59	8–6 (0–1)	Daniel-Meyer Coliseum (3,102); Fort Worth, TX
01/09/2010; 7:00 pm, The Mtn.		at Colorado State	L 48–70	8–7 (0–2)	Moby Arena (3,207); Fort Collins, CO
01/13/2010; 6:00 pm, The Mtn.		No. 18 BYU	L 49–67	8–8 (0–3)	Clune Arena (3,185); Colorado Springs, CO
01/20/2010; 7:00 pm		New Mexico	L 50–73	8–9 (0–4)	Clune Arena (2,156); Colorado Springs, CO
01/23/2010; 4:00 pm, The Mtn.		at Utah	L 54–71	8–10 (0–5)	Jon M. Huntsman Center (10,011); Salt Lake City, UT
01/26/2010; 6:30 pm, The Mtn.		at UNLV	L 50–60	8–11 (0–6)	Thomas & Mack Center (14,175); Las Vegas, NV
01/30/2010; 1:30 pm, The Mtn.		Wyoming	W 70–63	9–11 (1–6)	Clune Arena (4,969); Colorado Springs, CO
02/02/2010; 7:00 pm, CBSCS		at San Diego State	L 48–70	9–12 (1–7)	Viejas Arena (6,126); San Diego, CA
02/06/2010; 2:00 pm		TCU	L 51–65	9–13 (1–8)	Clune Arena (4,077); Colorado Springs, CO
02/09/2010; 8:00 pm, The Mtn.		Colorado State	L 47–51	9–14 (1–9)	Clune Arena (1,709); Colorado Springs, CO
02/13/2010; 4:00 pm, The Mtn.		at No. 17 BYU	L 48–91	9–15 (1–10)	Marriott Center (15,647); Provo, UT
02/20/2010; 1:30 pm, The Mtn.		at No. 12 New Mexico	L 56–59	9–16 (1–11)	University Arena (14,586); Albuquerque, NM
02/24/2010; 6:30 pm, The Mtn.		Utah	L 43–54	9–17 (1–12)	Clune Arena (1,862); Colorado Springs, CO
02/26/2010; 1:30 pm, The Mtn.		UNLV	L 47–77	9–18 (1–13)	Clune Arena (2,430); Colorado Springs, CO
03/02/2010; 7:30 pm, The Mtn.		at Wyoming	L 49–58	9–19 (1–14)	Arena-Auditorium (4,526); Laramie, WY
03/06/2010; 6:00 pm, The Mtn.		San Diego State	L 42–61	9–20 (1–15)	Clune Arena (3,352); Colorado Springs, CO
Mountain West tournament
03/10/2010; 3:00 pm, The Mtn.	(9)	vs. (8) Wyoming; MWC First Round	W 59–40	10–20	Thomas & Mack Center; Las Vegas, NV
03/11/2010; 1:00 pm, The Mtn.	(9)	vs. (1) No. 8 New Mexico; MWC Quarterfinals	L 69–75	10–21	Thomas & Mack Center; Las Vegas, NV
*Non-conference game. ^{#}Rankings from AP Poll/Coaches' Poll. (#) Tournament seedings in parentheses. All times are in Mountain Time.

== See also ==
- 2010–11 NCAA Division I men's basketball season
- 2010–11 NCAA Division I men's basketball rankings
