= 2009–10 Mountain West Conference men's basketball season =

- League: NCAA Division I
- Sport: Basketball
- Duration: December 9, 2009 through March 6, 2010
- Teams: 9
- TV partner: The Mtn.

Regular Season
- Season champions: New Mexico Lobos

Tournament

Basketball seasons
- ← 2008–09 2010–11 →

2009–10 Mountain West Conference men's basketball standings
	Conf.				Overall
Team	W		L	PCT	W		L	PCT
No. 8 New Mexico	14	–	2	.875	30	–	5	.857
No. 17 BYU	13	–	3	.813	30	–	6	.833
UNLV	11	–	5	.688	25	–	8	.758
San Diego State†	11	–	5	.688	25	–	9	.735
Colorado State	7	–	9	.438	16	–	16	.500
Utah	7	–	9	.438	14	–	17	.452
TCU	5	–	11	.313	13	–	19	.406
Wyoming	3	–	13	.188	10	–	21	.323
Air Force	1	–	15	.063	10	–	21	.323
† Conference tournament winner As of March 20, 2010; Rankings from AP/Coaches Poll

The 2009–10 Mountain West Conference men's basketball season marked the 11th season of Mountain West Conference basketball.

== Preseason ==
The Mountain West Conference held its pre-season media day on October 6, 2009 at The Mtn. studios in Denver, Colorado. The league's media overwhelmingly voted Brigham Young the preseason #1 and BYU junior guard Jimmer Fredette the preseason player of the year.

New Mexico's Roman Martinez was named to the 30-man Lowe's Senior CLASS Award preseason candidate list.

=== Mountain West Media Poll ===
Rank	Team	Votes
1	BYU (23)	215
2	San Diego State (1)	166
3	UNLV	161
4	Utah	143
5	New Mexico	141
6	Wyoming	89
7	TCU	82
8	Colorado State	58
9	Air Force	25

=== Preseason awards ===
Preseason All-MWC team

- Jimmer Fredette, BYU
- Jonathan Tavernari, BYU
- Billy White, San Diego State
- Zvonko Buljan, TCU
- Tre'Von Willis, UNLV

Preseason Player of the Year

- Jimmer Fredette, BYU

Preseason Newcomer of the Year

- Derrick Jasper, UNLV

Preseason Freshman of the Year

- Kawhi Leonard, San Diego State

== Regular season ==
=== Season summary & highlights ===
- TCU reached the quarterfinals of the NIT Season Tip-Off, losing to Arizona State, 52–49.
- Utah was the runner up in the Las Vegas Invitational, losing to Oklahoma State, 77–55.
- UNLV was the runner up in the inaugural Diamond Head Classic, losing to Southern California, 67–56.
- New Mexico ranks 17th in the Nation for Basketball Attendance. The Lobos averaged a crowd of 13,994. New Mexico was first in the Mountain West with UNLV in second.

=== Mountain West – Missouri Valley Challenge ===
2009 marks the inaugural year of the Mountain West - Missouri Valley Challenge – matching teams from the Mountain West against teams from the Missouri Valley Conference in an effort to bolster strength of schedule for both leagues. Match-ups were set in January, 2009 and were based on 2008–09 preseason projections. The MVC won the first Challenge 5–4 as Northern Iowa knocked off Wyoming in the final game.

==== Results ====
- November 13: BYU defeated Bradley, 70–60
- November 20: Colorado State lost to Indiana State, 65–60
- November 21: UNLV defeated Southern Illinois, 78–69
- December 5: Air Force lost to Missouri State, 58–48
- December 12: TCU lost to Wichita State, 80–68
- December 19: New Mexico defeated Creighton, 66–61
- December 19: Utah lost to Illinois State, 73–63
- December 22: San Diego State defeated Drake, 76–73 (OT)
- December 23: Wyoming lost to Northern Iowa, 72–54

=== Rankings ===
2009–10 Mountain West Conference Weekly Rankings Key: ██ Increase in ranking. ██ Decrease in ranking. RV = Received Votes
Coaches Poll	Pre	Wk 1	Wk 2	Wk 3	Wk 4	Wk 5	Wk 6	Wk 7	Wk 8	Wk 9	Wk 10	Wk 11	Wk 12	Wk 13	Wk 14	Wk 15	Wk 16	Wk 17	Wk 18	Final
Air Force																				
Brigham Young	RV	RV	RV	RV	RV	RV	RV	RV	25	18	14	12	12	17	17	14	11	15	15	16
Colorado State																				
New Mexico			RV	RV	RV	19	13	19	15	RV	RV	23	15	15	19	15	12	10	8	10
San Diego State																				RV
Texas Christian																				
UNLV			RV	21	17	20	23	RV	RV	RV		RV	RV	25	25	RV	RV	RV	RV	
Utah																				
Wyoming																				

== Conference awards & honors ==
=== Weekly awards ===
MWC Player of the Week
Throughout the conference season, the MWC offices name a player of the week.

Week	Player of the week
November 16	Jimmer Fredette, BYU
November 23	Darington Hobson, UNM
November 30	Grant Parker, AFA
December 7	Roman Martinez, UNM
December 21	Kawhi Leonard, SDSU
December 21	Roman Martinez, UNM
December 28	Edvinas Ruzgas, TCU
January 4	Jimmer Fredette, BYU
January 11	Andy Ogide, CSU
January 11	Jonathan Tavernari, BYU
January 18	A.J. Hardeman, UNM
January 25	Tre'Von Willis, UNLV
February 1	Jimmer Fredette, BYU
February 8	Darington Hobson, UNM, and Tre'Von Willis, UNLV
February 15	Kawhi Leonard, SDSU
February 22	Jimmer Fredette, BYU
March 1	Dairese Gary, UNM
March 8	Kawhi Leonard, SDSU
