= 2009–10 Wyoming Cowboys basketball team =

American college basketball season

2009–10 Wyoming Cowboys basketball
- Conference: Mountain West Conference
- Record: 10–21 (3–13 Mountain West)
- Head coach: Heath Schroyer
- Assistant coaches: Fred Langley; Shaun Vandiver; Anthony Stewart
- Home arena: Arena-Auditorium (Capacity: 15,028)

2009–10 Mountain West Conference men's basketball standings
| | Conf. | | | | Overall |
| Team | W | | L | PCT | W | | L | PCT |
|---|---|---|---|---|---|---|---|---|
| No. 8 New Mexico | 14 | – | 2 | .875 | 30 | – | 5 | .857 |
| No. 17 BYU | 13 | – | 3 | .813 | 30 | – | 6 | .833 |
| UNLV | 11 | – | 5 | .688 | 25 | – | 8 | .758 |
| San Diego State† | 11 | – | 5 | .688 | 25 | – | 9 | .735 |
| Colorado State | 7 | – | 9 | .438 | 16 | – | 16 | .500 |
| Utah | 7 | – | 9 | .438 | 14 | – | 17 | .452 |
| TCU | 5 | – | 11 | .313 | 13 | – | 19 | .406 |
| Wyoming | 3 | – | 13 | .188 | 10 | – | 21 | .323 |
| Air Force | 1 | – | 15 | .063 | 10 | – | 21 | .323 |
† Conference tournament winner As of March 20, 2010; Rankings from AP/Coaches Poll

The 2009–10 Wyoming Cowboys basketball team represented the University of Wyoming during the 2009–2010 NCAA Division I men's basketball season. The Cowboys were coached by Heath Schroyer who was in his 3rd season and played their home games at the Arena-Auditorium in Laramie, Wyoming. The Cowboys are a member of the Mountain West Conference. They finished the season 10–21, 3–13 in Mountain West play and lost in the first round of the 2010 Mountain West Conference men's basketball tournament to Air Force.

== Offseason ==
- April 15: Cowboy basketball head coach Heath Schroyer announced the signing of Desmar Jackson, a high school standout from Warren, Ohio, to a National Letter of Intent to attend the University of Wyoming. Jackson will enroll at Wyoming for the fall semester of 2009.
- April 27: Akron, Ohio native Daylen Harrison signed a National Letter of Intent to play basketball for the Cowboys on Sunday. Harrison will enroll at Wyoming for the fall semester of 2009, following his senior year of high school.
- May 6: University of Wyoming Athletics Director Tom Burman announced that head basketball coach Heath Schroyer's contract has been extended for two years, through April 30, 2014. Schroyer's base salary was also increased from $150,000 to $160,000. His original contract was a five-year deal that was due to end after the 2011-12 season.
- May 6: The NCAA released the Academic Progress Rate (APR) Public Report for the 2007–08 academic year, and the University of Wyoming men's basketball team received its highest annual score in the history of the APR. The team achieved an annual score of 935 during the 2007-08 academic year, the Cowboys improved their multiyear score to 884. Due to the Cowboys' academic improvement and a favorable comparison based on other academic and institutional factors, the Cowboys will be allotted 13 scholarships for the 2009–10 season. That is the maximum number of scholarships allowed by the NCAA for men's basketball programs.
- May 18: University of Wyoming redshirt sophomore point guard JayDee Luster was announced as a team captain for the 2009–10 Cowboy basketball team.

== Roster ==
2009–10 Wyoming Cowboys men's basketball team
Players
Coaches

| Pos. | # | Name | Height | Weight | Year | Previous school | Hometown |
|---|---|---|---|---|---|---|---|
| G | 1 | JayDee Luster | 5 ft 9 in (1.75 m) | 160 lb (73 kg) | So | New Mexico State; Hoover HS | San Diego, CA |
| G | 2 | Arthur Bouëdo | 6 ft 4 in (1.93 m) | 185 lb (84 kg) | So | Stoneridge Prep | Aix-en-Provence, France |
| G | 3 | Desmar Jackson | 6 ft 5 in (1.96 m) | 175 lb (79 kg) | Fr | Warren G. Harding HS | Warren, OH |
| F | 5 | Ryan Dermody | 6 ft 8 in (2.03 m) | 195 lb (88 kg) | Sr | Loveland HS | Loveland, CO |
| G | 10 | Thomas Manzano | 6 ft 4 in (1.93 m) | 205 lb (93 kg) | So | Garden City CC; Notre Dame Prep | Brooklyn, NY |
| F | 11 | Afam Muojeke | 6 ft 8 in (2.03 m) | 210 lb (95 kg) | So | Genesis One Prep | Jamaica, NY |
| C | 15 | Adam Waddell | 6 ft 10 in (2.08 m) | 235 lb (107 kg) | So | Cody HS | Cody, WY |
| F | 22 | Amath M'Baye | 6 ft 9 in (2.06 m) | 208 lb (94 kg) | Fr | Stoneridge Prep | Bordeaux, France |
| F | 25 | Djibril Thiam | 6 ft 10 in (2.08 m) | 215 lb (98 kg) | Jr | Baylor; Stoneridge Prep | Dakar, Senegal |
| F | 32 | Rob Watsabaugh | 6 ft 7 in (2.01 m) | 215 lb (98 kg) | Jr | Jackson HS | Jackson, WY |
| C | 33 | Boubacar Sylla | 7 ft 2 in (2.18 m) | 275 lb (125 kg) | So | Auburn; Stoneridge Prep | Paris, France |
| F | 35 | Daylen Harrison | 6 ft 6 in (1.98 m) | 214 lb (97 kg) | Fr | St. Vincent–St. Mary HS | Akron, OH |
| G | 51 | A. J. Davis | 6 ft 6 in (1.98 m) | 195 lb (88 kg) | So | Harmony Community School | Columbus, OH |

Head coach

- Heath Schroyer (Armstrong Atlantic State)

Assistant coach(es)

- Fred Langley (Fresno State)
- Shaun Vandiver (Colorado)
- Anthony Stewart (Mount Union)

Legend

- (C) Team captain
- (S) Suspended
- (I) Ineligible
- (W) Walk-on
- Injured
- Current redshirt

== Statistics ==
| Player | GP | GS | MPG | FG% | 3FG% | FT% | RPG | APG | SPG | BPG | PPG |
|---|---|---|---|---|---|---|---|---|---|---|---|
| Arthur Bouëdo | 17 | 12 | 22.9 | .343 | .286 | .529 | 1.6 | 1.2 | 0.5 | 0.1 | 5.5 |
| A.J. Davis | 22 | 19 | 20.6 | .429 | .107 | .783 | 2.5 | 0.7 | 1.7 | 0.1 | 10.0 |
| Ryan Dermody | 31 | 7 | 23.4 | .318 | .308 | .625 | 3.3 | 0.8 | 0.7 | 0.5 | 5.5 |
| Daylen Harrison | 28 | 1 | 11.7 | .362 | .297 | .667 | 1.9 | 0.8 | 0.3 | 0.1 | 2.9 |
| Desmar Jackson | 31 | 12 | 20.7 | .508 | .209 | .690 | 2.3 | 1.9 | 1.4 | 0.3 | 11.8 |
| Thomas Manzano | 8 | 1 | 17.6 | .417 | .095 | .583 | 2.3 | 1.4 | 0.5 | 0.0 | 7.0 |
| Amath M'Baye | 21 | 0 | 19.9 | .463 | .111 | .548 | 3.2 | 0.5 | 0.5 | 0.9 | 5.6 |
| Afam Muojeke | 16 | 14 | 28.4 | .433 | .333 | .835 | 3.9 | 1.4 | 1.6 | 0.3 | 16.8 |
| JayDee Luster | 29 | 27 | 27.9 | .299 | .268 | .655 | 3.0 | 4.3 | 1.2 | 0.0 | 5.7 |
| Boubacar Sylla | 29 | 14 | 10.3 | .409 | .000 | .595 | 2.9 | 0.1 | 0.2 | 0.9 | 2.6 |
| Djibril Thiam | 31 | 31 | 27.5 | .563 | .250 | .641 | 5.3 | 0.8 | 0.8 | 0.8 | 9.5 |
| Adam Waddell | 29 | 17 | 24.0 | .522 | .000 | .620 | 5.4 | 0.3 | 0.6 | 0.8 | 9.4 |
| Rob Watsabaugh | 9 | 0 | 2.2 | .571 | .000 | .500 | 0.3 | 0.0 | 0.0 | 0.1 | 1.0 |

== Schedule and results ==
| Date time, TV | Rank^{#} | Opponent^{#} | Result | Record | Site (attendance) city, state |
Exhibition
| 11/08/2009*; 7:00 pm | | Regis | W 78–60 | – | Arena-Auditorium (6,083); Laramie, WY |
Regular Season
| 11/13/2009*; 7:30 pm | | South Dakota State | L 61–77 | 0–1 | Arena-Auditorium (5,370); Laramie, WY |
| 11/18/2009*; 7:00 pm | | Peru State | W 120–73 | 1–1 | Arena-Auditorium (4,543); Laramie, WY |
| 11/21/2009*; 7:00 pm | | Boise State | W 87–61 | 2–1 | Arena-Auditorium (5,298); Laramie, WY |
| 11/25/2009*; 7:00 pm | | at Denver | L 77–80 | 2–2 | Magness Arena (2,934); Denver, CO |
| 11/27/2009*; 7:30 pm | | Monmouth; World Vision Challenge | L 73–75 | 2–3 | Arena-Auditorium (4,555); Laramie, WY |
| 11/28/2009*; 7:30 pm | | Hampton; World Vision Challenge | L 67–78 | 2–4 | Arena-Auditorium (4,463); Laramie, WY |
| 11/29/2009*; 3:00 pm | | Pepperdine; World Vision Challenge | W 86–82 ^{OT} | 3–4 | Arena-Auditorium (4,299); Laramie, WY |
| 12/05/2009*; 7:00 pm | | Loyola Marymount | W 76–70 | 4–4 | Arena-Auditorium (6,259); Laramie, WY |
| 12/12/2009*; 3:30 pm | | vs. Northern Colorado; Blue Cross/Blue Shield of Wyoming Shootout | W 76–70 | 5–4 | Casper Events Center (3,520); Casper, WY |
| 12/15/2009*; 5:00 pm, ESPNU | | at No. 9 Tennessee | L 58–77 | 5–5 | Thompson-Boling Arena (17,274); Knoxville, TN |
| 12/20/2009*; 5:30 pm | | South Dakota | W 72–54 | 6–5 | Arena-Auditorium (4,330); Laramie, WY |
| 12/23/2009*; 6:00 pm | | at Northern Iowa; MWC–MVC Challenge | L 54–72 | 6–6 | McLeod Center (3,102); Cedar Falls, IA |
| 12/30/2009*; 7:00 pm | | Akron | L 76–85 | 6–7 | Arena-Auditorium (4,414); Laramie, WY |
| 01/02/2010*; 2:00 pm | | Adams State | W 123–71 | 7–7 | Arena-Auditorium (4,467); Laramie, WY |
| 01/06/2010; 6:00 pm, The Mtn. | | Colorado State | L 73–83 | 7–8 (0–1) | Arena-Auditorium (4,397); Laramie, WY |
| 01/09/2010; 4:00 pm, The Mtn. | | San Diego State | W 85–83 | 8–8 (1–1) | Arena-Auditorium (4,826); Laramie, WY |
| 01/12/2010; 5:30 pm, The Mtn. | | at TCU | L 59–62 | 8–9 (1–2) | Daniel-Meyer Coliseum (3,308); Fort Worth, TX |
| 01/16/2010; 1:30 pm, The Mtn. | | New Mexico | L 68–70 | 8–10 (1–3) | Arena-Auditorium (6,146); Laramie, WY |
| 01/20/2010; 6:00 pm, The Mtn. | | at No. 14 BYU | L 66–81 | 8–11 (1–4) | Marriott Center (10,931); Provo, UT |
| 01/27/2010; 7:00 pm | | Utah | W 75–69 | 9–11 (2–4) | Arena-Auditorium (4,828); Laramie, WY |
| 01/30/2010; 1:30 pm, The Mtn. | | at Air Force | L 63–70 | 9–12 (2–5) | Clune Arena (3,414); Colorado Springs, CO |
| 02/03/2010; 8:00 pm, The Mtn. | | UNLV | L 50–78 | 9–13 (2–6) | Arena-Auditorium (4,718); Laramie, WY |
| 02/06/2010; 7:00 pm, The Mtn. | | Colorado State | L 64–80 | 9–14 (2–7) | Moby Arena (5,277); Fort Collins, CO |
| 02/10/2010; 8:30 pm, The Mtn. | | at San Diego State | L 57–88 | 9–15 (2–8) | Viejas Arena (6,606); San Diego, CA |
| 02/13/2010; 1:30 pm, The Mtn. | | TCU | L 68–76 | 9–16 (2–9) | Arena-Auditorium (5,338); Laramie, WY |
| 02/17/2010; 7:00 pm, CBSCS | | at No. 12 New Mexico | L 61–83 | 9–17 (2–10) | The Pit (14,586); Albuquerque, NM |
| 02/20/2010; 4:00 pm, The Mtn. | | No. 16 BYU | L 63–85 | 9–18 (2–11) | Arena-Auditorium (5,154); Laramie, WY |
| 02/27/2010; 4:00 pm, The Mtn. | | at Utah | L 64–74 | 9–19 (2–12) | Jon M. Huntsman Center (10,138); Salt Lake City, UT |
| 03/02/2010; 7:30 pm, The Mtn. | | Air Force | W 58–49 | 10–19 (3–12) | Arena-Auditorium (4,526); Laramie, WY |
| 03/06/2010; 2:00 pm, Versus | | at UNLV | L 56–74 | 10–20 (3–13) | Thomas & Mack Center (14,116); Las Vegas, NV |
Mountain West tournament
| 03/10/2010; 2:00 pm, The Mtn. | (8) | vs. (9) Air Force; MWC First Round | L 40–59 | 10–21 | Thomas & Mack Center; Las Vegas, NV |
*Non-conference game. ^{#}Rankings from AP Poll. (#) Tournament seedings in parentheses. All times are in Mountain Time. Source
