= Mountain West–Missouri Valley Challenge =

College basketball tournament

MW–MVC Challenge logo

The Mountain West – Missouri Valley Challenge was an in-season NCAA Division I men's college basketball series, pitting teams from the Mountain West Conference (MW) and the Missouri Valley Conference (MVC). The series began in November 2009 and featured all of the MW teams against most of the MVC teams. The series has not been extended since the conclusion of the 2018 offering.

The first challenge was held in 2009. The conferences agreed to a four-year deal, extending the challenge through 2012. The challenge was not extended beyond its initial term and ended after 2012. However, after a two-year hiatus, it was announced on April 2, 2015 that the conferences would renew the series in 2015 for another four years.

The MW–MVC Challenge occurred from mid-November through mid-December. The games were hosted by each of the institutions. Since its inception, one or more schools sat out each iteration due to unbalanced membership numbers. The first four series had at least one MVC squad without an opponent (including 2011 when two teams were not scheduled). Upon its resumption in 2015, it was the MW that had one team not participating.

The MW leads the eight season series with three wins, one loss, and four ties. Of the schools with more than two decisions, New Mexico (MW, .875) and Wichita State (MVC, .833) have the best percentages for their respective conferences.

== Institution Records ==
=== Missouri Valley Conference ===
- (1-3-4)

Institution	Wins	Losses	Percentage
Valparaiso Crusaders	2	0	1.000
Wichita State Shockers *	5	1	.833
Indiana State Sycamores	5	3	.625
Southern Illinois Salukis	3	3	.500
Northern Iowa Panthers	4	4	.500
Evansville Purple Aces	4	4	.500
Drake Bulldogs	3	5	.375
Illinois State Redbirds	2	5	.286
Missouri State Bears	2	5	.286
Loyola–Chicago Ramblers	1	3	.250
Creighton Bluejays *	1	3	.250
Bradley Braves	0	7	.000
Overall	32	43	.427

* Institution that is no longer a member of the MVC.

=== Mountain West Conference ===
- (3-1-4)

Institution	Wins	Losses	Percentage
Brigham Young Cougars *	2	0	1.000
New Mexico Lobos	7	1	.875
Nevada Wolf Pack	4	1	.800
San Diego State Aztecs	6	2	.750
Boise State Broncos	4	2	.667
Wyoming Cowboys	5	3	.625
Utah Utes *	1	1	.500
Utah State Aggies	2	2	.500
Nevada–Las Vegas Runnin' Rebels	4	4	.500
Colorado State Rams	3	5	.375
Air Force Falcons	3	5	.375
Fresno State Bulldogs	1	2	.333
Texas Christian Horned Frogs *	1	2	.333
San Jose State Spartans	0	2	.000
Overall	43	32	.573

* Institution that is no longer a member of the MW.

== Challenges ==
=== 2009 ===
- The Missouri Valley Conference had ten members schools and the Mountain West Conference had nine member schools; accordingly, only nine match-ups were scheduled.

Date Time, Television	MVC Opponent	MW Opponent	Result	Record	Site (Attendance) City, State
November 13, 2009; 7:30 PM, The Mtn.	Bradley	at **Brigham Young**	60–**70**	MW (1–0)	Marriott Center (16,276); Provo, UT
November 20, 2009; 5:05 PM	at **Indiana State**	Colorado State	**65**–60	Tie (1–1)	Hulman Center (4,308); Terre Haute, IN
November 21, 2009; 7:05 PM	Southern Illinois	at **Nevada–Las Vegas**	69–**78**	MW (2–1)	Thomas & Mack Center (11,651); Paradise, NV
December 5, 2009; 7:00 PM	at **Missouri State**	Air Force	**58**–48	Tie (2–2)	JQH Arena (7,524); Springfield, MO
December 12, 2009; 6:05 PM	at **Wichita State**	Texas Christian	**80**–68	MVC (3–2)	Charles Koch Arena (10,506); Wichita, KS
December 19, 2009; 4:00 PM, The Mtn.	**Illinois State**	at Utah	**73**–63	MVC (4–2)	Jon M. Huntsman Center (8,403); Salt Lake City, UT
December 19, 2009; 7:05 PM, The Mtn.	Creighton	at No. 19 **New Mexico**	61–**66**	MVC (4–3)	The Pit (14,333); Albuquerque, NM
December 22, 2009; 7:05 PM, Metro Sports	at Drake	**San Diego State**	73–**76** ^{OT}	Tie (4–4)	The Knapp Center (4,012); Des Moines, IA
December 23, 2009; 6:07 PM, CFU 15/ KWWL	at **Northern Iowa**	Wyoming	**72**–54	**MVC** (**5**–4)	McLeod Center (3,102); Cedar Falls, IA
Winner denoted in **bold**. (Time is Mountain Standard Time (MST)).

- Evansville did not participate in the 2009 Challenge.

=== 2010 ===
Date Time, Television	MVC Opponent	MW Opponent	Result	Record	Site (Attendance) City, State
December 1, 2010; 6:00 PM, The Mtn.	Drake	at **Colorado State**	67–**78**	MW (1–0)	Moby Arena (2,215); Fort Collins, CO
December 1, 2010; 6:05 PM, KMTV	at Creighton	No. 21 **Brigham Young**	65–**77**	MW (2–0)	CenturyLink Center Omaha (15,532); Omaha, NE
December 1, 2010; 6:05 PM	at Illinois State	No. 23 **Nevada–Las Vegas**	51–**82**	MW (3–0)	Redbird Arena (6,485); Normal, IL
December 1, 2010; 6:05 PM	at Southern Illinois	**New Mexico**	59–**74**	MW (4–0)	SIU Arena (4,531); Carbondale, IL
December 4, 2010; 12:00 PM, The Mtn.	**Northern Iowa**	at Texas Christian	**64**–60	MW (4–1)	Daniel-Meyer Coliseum (4,022); Fort Worth, TX
December 4, 2010; 5:00 PM, The Mtn.	Indiana State	at **Wyoming**	51–**81**	MW (5–1)	Arena-Auditorium (7,008); Laramie, WY
December 4, 2010; 6:05 PM, WTVP	at Bradley	**Utah**	60–**68**	MW (6–1)	Carver Arena (9,076); Peoria, IL
December 4, 2010; 8:05 PM, The Mtn.	Wichita State	at **San Diego State**	69–**83**	MW (7–1)	Viejas Arena (12,414); San Diego, CA
December 5, 2010; 1:05 PM, The Mtn.	Evansville	at **Air Force**	56–**57**	**MW** (**8**–1)	Clune Arena (1,148); Colorado Springs, CO
Winner denoted in **bold**. (Time is Mountain Standard Time (MST)).

- Missouri State did not participate in the 2010 Challenge.

=== 2011 ===
- The Mountain West Conference had two member schools (Brigham Young, Utah) depart the conference and one school (Boise State) arrive prior to the 2011 Challenge, leaving the MW with eight member schools; accordingly, only eight match-ups were scheduled.

Date Time, Television	MVC Opponent	MW Opponent	Result	Record	Site (Attendance) City, State
November 30, 2011; 8:30 PM, The Mtn.	No. 22 **Creighton**	at San Diego State	**85**–83	MVC (1–0)	Viejas Arena (12,414); San Diego, CA
December 3, 2011; 12:30 PM	at **Northern Iowa**	Colorado State	**83**–77	MVC (2–0)	McLeod Center (4,015); Cedar Falls, IA
December 3, 2011; 6:05 PM, Mediacom	at **Drake**	Air Force	**62**–60	MVC (3–0)	The Knapp Center (3,583); Des Moines, IA
December 3, 2011; 6:05 PM	at Evansville	**Texas Christian**	68–**70**	MVC (3–1)	Ford Center (5,198); Evansville, IN
December 3, 2011; 8:00 PM	Indiana State	at **Boise State**	65–**74**	MVC (3–2)	Taco Bell Arena (5,342); Boise, ID
December 3, 2011; 8:00 PM, The Mtn.	Missouri State	at **New Mexico**	60–**76**	Tied (3–3)	The Pit (14,077); Albuquerque, NM
December 3, 2011; 8:00 PM	Bradley	at **Wyoming**	49–**66**	MW (4–3)	Arena-Auditorium (4,643); Laramie, WY
December 4, 2011; 2:05 PM, Cox Kansas 22/ Cox Las Vegas 96	at **Wichita State**	No. 20 Nevada–Las Vegas	**89**–70	Tied (4–4)	Charles Koch Arena (10,466); Wichita, KS
Winner denoted in **bold**. (Time is Mountain Standard Time (MST)).

- Illinois State and Southern Illinois did not participate in the 2011 Challenge.

=== 2012 ===
- The Mountain West Conference had one member school (Texas Christian) depart the conference and two schools (Fresno State and Nevada) arrive prior to the 2012 Challenge, returning the conference to nine member schools; accordingly, nine match-ups were scheduled.

Date Time, Television	MVC Opponent	MW Opponent	Result	Record	Site (Attendance) City, State
November 17, 2012; 12:00 PM	at Missouri State	No. 23 **San Diego State**	44–**60**	MW (1–0)	JQH Arena (7,272); Springfield, MO
November 28, 2012; 6:05 PM, Cox Nebraska 78	at No. 11 Creighton	**Boise State**	70–**83**	MW (2–0)	CenturyLink Center Omaha (16,364); Omaha, NE
November 28, 2012; 6:05 PM	at **Southern Illinois**	Fresno State	**57**–54	MW (2–1)	SIU Arena (5,409); Carbondale, IL
November 30, 2012; 8:00 PM	**Drake**	at Nevada	**76**–66	Tied (2–2)	Lawlor Events Center (6,649); Reno, NV
December 1, 2012; 12:05 PM, WTWO	at Indiana State	No. 25 **New Mexico**	68–**77** ^{OT}	MW (3–2)	Hulman Center (6,080); Terre Haute, IN
December 1, 2012; 2:30 PM	Evansville	at **Colorado State**	72–**79**	MW (4–2)	Moby Arena (3,970); Fort Collins, CO
December 2, 2012; 3:00 PM, Cox Kansas 22	**Wichita State**	at Air Force	**72**–69	MW (4–3)	Clune Arena (1,793); Colorado Springs, CO
December 4, 2012; 7:05 PM	at Illinois State	**Wyoming**	67–**81**	MW (5–3)	Redbird Arena (6,561); Normal, IL
December 19, 2012; 8:00 PM, TWSN	Northern Iowa	at No. 21 **Nevada–Las Vegas**	59–**73**	**MW** (**6**–3)	Thomas & Mack Center (14,484); Paradise, NV
Winner denoted in **bold**. (Time is Mountain Standard Time (MST)).

- Bradley did not participate in the 2012 Challenge.

=== 2015 ===
- The Challenge was not held as part of the 2013–14 or 2014–15 seasons. During this time period, the Missouri Valley Conference had one member school (Creighton) depart the conference and one school (Loyola–Chicago) arrive, maintaining the conference at ten member schools; the Mountain West Conference had two schools (San Jose State, Utah State) arrive, expanding the conference to eleven members. Accordingly, ten match-ups were scheduled.

Date Time, Television	MVC Opponent	MW Opponent	Result	Record	Site (Attendance) City, State
November 13, 2015; 6:00 PM, ESPN3	at **Southern Illinois**	Air Force	**77**–75	MVC (1–0)	SIU Arena (4,759); Carbondale, IL
November 13, 2015; 8:00 PM, ESPN3	Illinois State	at **San Diego State**	61–**71**	Tied (1–1)	Viejas Arena (12,414); San Diego, CA
November 14, 2015; 10:00 AM, CSN Chicago	at Northern Iowa	**Colorado State**	78–**84**	MW (2–1)	McLeod Center (4,455); Cedar Falls, IA
November 16, 2015; 5:00 PM, ESPN3	at **Indiana State**	Wyoming	**70**–55	Tied (2–2)	Hulman Center (3,601); Terre Haute, IN
November 18, 2015; 7:00 PM, Root Sports	Loyola–Chicago	at **New Mexico**	51–**75**	MW (3–2)	WisePies Arena (11,951); Albuquerque, NM
December 1, 2015; 6:00 PM, KOZL	at Missouri State	**Utah State**	68–**69**	MW (4–2)	JQH Arena (3,694); Springfield, MO
December 9, 2015; 7:00 PM, ESPN2	at **Wichita State**	Nevada–Las Vegas	**56**–50	MW (4–3)	Charles Koch Arena (10,506); Wichita, KS
December 12, 2015; 5:00 PM	Drake	at **Nevada**	71–**79**	MW (5–3)	Lawlor Events Center (5,541); Reno, NV
December 20, 2015; 12:00 PM, Root Sports	Bradley	at **Boise State**	70–**90**	MW (6–3)	Taco Bell Arena (4,405); Boise, ID
December 20, 2015; 2:00 PM	**Evansville**	at Fresno State	**85**–77	**MW** (**6**–4)	Save Mart Center (5,251); Fresno, CA
Winner denoted in **bold**. (Time is Mountain Standard Time (MST)).

- San Jose State did not participate in the 2015 Challenge.

=== 2016 ===
Date Time, Television	MVC Opponent	MW Opponent	Result	Record	Site (Attendance) City, State
December 3, 2016; 12:00 PM, ESPN3	at **Evansville**	Boise State	**72**–67	MVC (1–0)	Ford Center (3,773); Evansville, IN
December 3, 2016; 1:00 PM, MC22	at Drake	**Fresno State**	76–**78** ^{OT}	Tied (1–1)	The Knapp Center (2,633); Des Moines, IA
December 3, 2016; 2:00 PM, ESPN3	at **Loyola–Chicago**	San Diego State	**65**–59	MVC (2–1)	Joseph J. Gentile Arena (2,189); Chicago, IL
December 3, 2016; 3:00 PM, CBSSN	**Wichita State**	at Colorado State	**82**–67	MVC (3–1)	Moby Arena (6,918); Fort Collins, CO
December 3, 2016; 4:00 PM, MWN	Northern Iowa	at **Wyoming**	73–**81**	MVC (3–2)	Arena-Auditorium (5,539); Laramie, WY
December 3, 2016; 6:00 PM, CSN Chicago	at Bradley	**Nevada**	69–**91**	Tied (3–3)	Carver Arena (5,384); Peoria, IL
December 3, 2016; 6:00 PM, CSN Chicago Plus	at **Illinois State**	New Mexico	**79**–74	MVC (4–3)	Redbird Arena (6,056); Normal, IL
December 3, 2016; 7:00 PM	Missouri State	at **Air Force**	70–**83**	Tied (4–4)	Clune Arena (1,986); Colorado Springs, CO
December 3, 2016; 7:00 PM	**Indiana State**	at Utah State	**62**–61	MVC (5–4)	Dee Glen Smith Spectrum (7,064); Logan, UT
December 19, 2016; 8:00 PM	Southern Illinois	at **Nevada–Las Vegas**	61–**68**	Tied (5–5)	Thomas & Mack Center (11,758); Paradise, NV
Winner denoted in **bold**. (Time is Mountain Standard Time (MST)).

- San Jose State did not participate in the 2016 Challenge.

=== 2017 ===
- The Missouri Valley Conference had one member school (Wichita State) depart the conference and one school (Valparaiso) arrive prior to the 2017 Challenge, maintaining the conference at ten member schools; accordingly, ten match-ups were scheduled.

Date Time, Television	MVC Opponent	MW Opponent	Result	Record	Site (Attendance) City, State
November 28, 2017; 6:00 PM, ESPN3	at **Missouri State**	Colorado State	**77**–67	MVC (1–0)	JQH Arena (4,895); Springfield, MO
November 28, 2017; 6:00 PM, ESPN3	at **Valparaiso**	Utah State	**72**–65	MVC (2–0)	Athletics–Recreation Center (2,949); Valparaiso, IN
November 28, 2017; 7:00 PM	Loyola–Chicago	at **Boise State**	53–**87**	MVC (2–1)	Taco Bell Arena (3,738); Boise, ID
November 29, 2017; 5:00 PM, ESPN3	at **Indiana State**	Air Force	**74**–64	MVC (3–1)	Hulman Center (3,797); Terre Haute, IN
November 29, 2017; 6:00 PM, ESPN3	at **Northern Iowa**	Nevada–Las Vegas	**77**–68 ^{OT}	MVC (4–1)	McLeod Center (4,546); Cedar Falls, IA
November 29, 2017; 7:00 PM, AT&T RM	Evansville	at **New Mexico**	59–**78**	MVC (4–2)	Dreamstyle Arena (8,943); Albuquerque, NM
November 29, 2017; 8:00 PM, Stadium	Illinois State	at **Nevada**	68–**98**	MVC (4–3)	Lawlor Events Center (8,293); Reno, NV
December 2, 2017; 2:00 PM, ESPN3	at **Southern Illinois**	San Jose State	**76**–58	MVC (5–3)	SIU Arena (4,026); Carbondale, IL
December 2, 2017; 4:00 PM	Drake	at **Wyoming**	89–**96** ^{OT}	MVC (5–4)	Arena-Auditorium (4,853); Laramie, WY
December 3, 2017; 4:00 PM, Stadium	Bradley	at **San Diego State**	52–**75**	Tied (5–5)	Viejas Arena (11,102); San Diego, CA
Winner denoted in **bold**. (Time is Mountain Standard Time (MST)).

- Fresno State did not participate in the 2017 Challenge.

=== 2018 ===
Date Time, Television	MVC Opponent	MW Opponent	Result	Record	Site (Attendance) City, State
November 27, 2018; 6:00 PM, MC22	at **Drake**	Boise State	**83**–74	MVC (1–0)	The Knapp Center (2,543); Des Moines, IA
November 27, 2018; 6:00 PM, ESPNews	at Loyola–Chicago	No. 5 **Nevada**	65–**79**	Tied (1–1)	Joseph J. Gentile Arena (4,963); Chicago, IL
November 27, 2018; 7:00 PM	**Southern Illinois**	at Colorado State	**82**–67	MVC (2–1)	Moby Arena (2,566); Fort Collins, CO
November 28, 2018; 5:00 PM, ESPN+	at **Evansville**	Wyoming	**86**–78	MVC (3–1)	Ford Center (4,709); Evansville, IN
November 28, 2018; 7:00 PM	Northern Iowa	at **Utah State**	52–**71**	MVC (3–2)	Dee Glen Smith Spectrum (5,134); Logan, UT
November 28, 2018; 7:15 PM	Missouri State	at **Air Force**	69–**88**	Tied (3–3)	Clune Arena (1,629); Colorado Springs, CO
November 28, 2018; 8:00 PM	**Indiana State**	at San Jose State	**86**–57	MVC (4–3)	Event Center Arena (1,523); San Jose, CA
November 28, 2018; 8:30 PM, AT&T RM	**Valparaiso**	at Nevada–Las Vegas	**72**–64	MVC (5–3)	Thomas & Mack Center (7,587); Paradise, NV
December 1, 2018; 1:00 PM, ESPN+	at Illinois State	**San Diego State**	65–**75**	MVC (5–4)	Redbird Arena (6,245); Normal, IL
December 1, 2018; 6:00 PM, ESPN+	at Bradley	**New Mexico**	75–**85**	Tied (5–5)	Carver Arena (5,494); Peoria, IL
Winner denoted in **bold**. (Time is Mountain Standard Time (MST)).

- Fresno State did not participate in the 2018 Challenge.
