= 2009–10 BYU Cougars men's basketball team =

American college basketball season

2009–10 BYU Cougars men's basketball

NCAA tournament, second round
- Conference: Mountain West Conference

Ranking
- Coaches: No. 22
- AP: No. 17
- Record: 30–6 (13–3 Mountain West)
- Head coach: Dave Rose
- Assistant coaches: Dave Rice; John Wardenburg; Terry Nashif
- Home arena: Marriott Center

2009–10 Mountain West Conference men's basketball standings
| | Conf. | | | | Overall |
| Team | W | | L | PCT | W | | L | PCT |
|---|---|---|---|---|---|---|---|---|
| No. 8 New Mexico | 14 | – | 2 | .875 | 30 | – | 5 | .857 |
| No. 17 BYU | 13 | – | 3 | .813 | 30 | – | 6 | .833 |
| UNLV | 11 | – | 5 | .688 | 25 | – | 8 | .758 |
| San Diego State† | 11 | – | 5 | .688 | 25 | – | 9 | .735 |
| Colorado State | 7 | – | 9 | .438 | 16 | – | 16 | .500 |
| Utah | 7 | – | 9 | .438 | 14 | – | 17 | .452 |
| TCU | 5 | – | 11 | .313 | 13 | – | 19 | .406 |
| Wyoming | 3 | – | 13 | .188 | 10 | – | 21 | .323 |
| Air Force | 1 | – | 15 | .063 | 10 | – | 21 | .323 |
† Conference tournament winner As of March 20, 2010; Rankings from AP/Coaches Poll

The 2009–10 BYU Cougars men's basketball team represented Brigham Young University in the 2009–10 college basketball season. This was head coach Dave Rose's fifth season at BYU. The Cougars were members of the Mountain West Conference and played their home games at the Marriott Center. They finished the season 30–6, 13–3 in MWC play. They advanced to the semifinals of the 2010 Mountain West Conference men's basketball tournament before losing to UNLV. They received an at–large bid to the 2010 NCAA Division I men's basketball tournament, earning a 7 seed in the West Region. They beat 10 seed Florida in double overtime in the first round before losing to 2 seed and AP #7 Kansas State in the second round.

== Pre-season ==
In the Mountain West preseason polls, released October 6 at The Mtn. studios in Denver, Colorado, BYU was selected to finish first in the media poll. Jr. Jimmer Fredette was selected as the preseason conference player of the year along with being selected to the preseason MWC first team. Sr. Jonathan Tavernari was also selected to the preseason first team.

== Roster ==
| # | Name | Height | Weight (lbs.) | Position | Class | Hometown | Previous Team(s) |
|---|---|---|---|---|---|---|---|
| 0 | Brandon Davies | 6'9" | 230 | F | Fr. | Provo, Utah, United States | Provo HS |
| 1 | Charles Abouo | 6'5" | 210 | G F | So. | Abidjan, Côte d'Ivoire | Brewster Academy |
| 2 | Lamont Morgan Jr. | 5'10" | 170 | G | Sr. | Pomona, California, United States | Diamond Ranch HS; Saddleback CC |
| 4 | Jackson Emery | 6'3" | 185 | G | Jr. | Alpine, Utah, United States | Lone Peak HS |
| 10 | Michael Loyd Jr. | 6'1" | 170 | G | So. | Las Vegas, Nevada, United States | Palo Verde HS |
| 12 | Logan Magnusson | 6'6" | 210 | G F | Jr. | Heber City, Utah, United States | Wasatch HS; Salt Lake CC |
| 13 | Brock Zylstra | 6'6" | 205 | G F | Jr. | La Verne, California, United States | Bonita HS |
| 15 | James Anderson | 6'10" | 230 | F C | So. | Page, Arizona, United States | Page HS |
| 23 | Tyler Haws | 6'5" | 200 | G | Fr. | Alpine, Utah, United States | Lone Peak HS |
| 32 | Jimmer Fredette | 6'2" | 195 | G | Jr. | Glens Falls, New York, United States | Glens Falls HS |
| 34 | Noah Hartsock | 6'8" | 215 | F | So. | Bartlesville, Oklahoma, United States | Bartlesville HS |
| 45 | Jonathan Tavernari | 6'6" | 215 | G F | Sr. | São Bernardo do Campo, Brazil | Bishop Gorman HS |
| 54 | Chris Miles | 6'11" | 235 | F C | Sr. | Provo, Utah, United States | Timpview HS |

== Schedule and results ==
| Date time, TV | Rank^{#} | Opponent^{#} | Result | Record | Site (attendance) city, state |
Exhibition
| 11/05/2009*; 7:05 pm, BYU TV | | Trinity Western | W 74–56 | — | Marriott Center (7,533); Provo, UT |
| 11/10/2009*; 7:35 pm, BYU TV | | Central Washington | W 82–46 | — | Marriott Center; Provo, UT |
Regular Season
| 11/13/2009*; 7:35 pm, The Mtn. | | Bradley; MWC–MVC Challenge | W 70–60 | 1–0 | Marriott Center (16,276); Provo, UT |
| 11/17/2009*; 7:35 pm | | Idaho State | W 87–53 | 2–0 | Marriott Center (8,367); Provo, UT |
| 11/20/2009*; 10:05 pm, KFVE | | at Hawai'i | W 83–65 | 3–0 | Stan Sheriff Center (5,891); Honolulu, HI |
| 11/24/2009*; 7:05 pm | | Southern | W 107–51 | 4–0 | Marriott Center (9,596); Provo, UT |
| 11/27/2009*; 7:35 pm, The Mtn. | | Weber State; Old Oquirrh Bucket | W 87–70 | 5–0 | Marriott Center (11,892); Provo, UT |
| 12/02/2009*; 7:05 pm, CW30 | | at Utah State; Old Oquirrh Bucket | L 61–71 | 5–1 | Smith Spectrum (10,270); Logan, UT |
| 12/05/2009*; 4:05 pm, BYU TV/KJZZ | | vs. San Francisco | W 69–43 | 6–1 | EnergySolutions Arena (10,106); Salt Lake City, UT |
| 12/08/2009*; 8:05 pm, The Mtn. | | Arizona State | W 81–68 | 7–1 | Marriott Center (11,587); Provo, UT |
| 12/12/2009*; 8:00 pm, KJZZ | | at Fresno State | W 72–67 | 8–1 | Save Mart Center (4,853); Fresno, CA |
| 12/17/2009*; 7:05 pm, BYU TV | | Wagner; Las Vegas Classic | W 77–61 | 9–1 | Marriott Center (8,031); Provo, UT |
| 12/19/2009*; 7:05 pm, BYU TV | | Eastern Washington; Las Vegas Classic | W 91–34 | 10–1 | Marriott Center (8,003); Provo, UT |
| 12/22/2009*; 12:00 pm, BYU TV | | vs. Nevada; Las Vegas Classic semifinals | W 110–104 | 11–1 | Orleans Arena; Paradise, NV |
| 12/23/2009*; 12:00 pm, BYU TV | | vs. Nebraska; Las Vegas Classic championship | W 88–66 | 12–1 | Orleans Arena (1,817); Paradise, NV |
| 12/28/2009*; 7:00 pm, FCS | | at Arizona; Fiesta Bowl Basketball Classic | W 99–69 | 13–1 | McKale Center (13,992); Tucson, AZ |
| 01/02/2010*; 7:05 pm | | Eastern New Mexico | W 95–49 | 14–1 | Marriott Center (11,293); Provo, UT |
| 01/06/2010; 8:05 pm, The Mtn. | No. 25 | UNLV | W 77–73 | 15–1 (1–0) | Marriott Center (15,546); Provo, UT |
| 01/09/2010*; 7:00 pm, CBSCS | No. 25 | at UTEP | W 83–77 | 16–1 | Don Haskins Center (8,687); El Paso, TX |
| 01/13/2010; 6:00 pm, The Mtn. | No. 18 | at Air Force | W 67–49 | 17–1 (2–0) | Clune Arena (3,185); Colorado Springs, CO |
| 01/16/2010; 4:05 pm, The Mtn. | No. 18 | Colorado State | W 91–47 | 18–1 (3–0) | Marriott Center (20,155); Provo, UT |
| 01/20/2010; 6:05 pm, The Mtn. | No. 14 | Wyoming | W 81–66 | 19–1 (4–0) | Marriott Center (10,931); Provo, UT |
| 01/23/2010; 8:00 pm, The Mtn. | No. 14 | at San Diego State | W 71–69 | 20–1 (5–0) | Viejas Arena (12,414); San Diego, CA |
| 01/27/2010; 8:00 pm, The Mtn. | No. 12 | at No. 23 New Mexico | L 72–76 | 20–2 (5–1) | The Pit (14,586); Albuquerque, NM |
| 01/30/2010; 7:05 pm, The Mtn. | No. 12 | Utah; Old Oquirrh Bucket | W 82–69 | 21–2 (6–1) | Marriott Center (22,644); Provo, UT |
| 02/02/2010; 7:05 pm, The Mtn. | No. 12 | TCU | W 76–56 | 22–2 (7–1) | Marriott Center (11,454); Provo, UT |
| 02/06/2010; 1:00 pm, Versus | No. 12 | at UNLV | L 74–88 | 22–3 (7–2) | Thomas & Mack Center (18,557); Paradise, NV |
| 02/13/2010; 4:05 pm, The Mtn. | No. 17 | Air Force | W 91–48 | 23–3 (8–2) | Marriott Center (15,647); Provo, UT |
| 02/17/2010; 6:00 pm, The Mtn. | No. 16 | at Colorado State | W 92–40 | 24–3 (9–2) | Moby Arena (3,738); Fort Collins, CO |
| 02/20/2010; 4:00 pm, The Mtn. | No. 16 | at Wyoming | W 85–63 | 25–3 (10–2) | Arena-Auditorium (5,154); Laramie, WY |
| 02/24/2010; 7:05 pm, CBSCS | No. 13 | San Diego State | W 82–68 | 26–3 (11–2) | Marriott Center (20,124); Provo, UT |
| 02/27/2010; 2:05 pm, Versus | No. 13 | No. 10 New Mexico | L 81–83 | 26–4 (11–3) | Marriott Center (22,644); Provo, UT |
| 03/03/2010; 7:00 pm, CBSCS | No. 14 | at Utah; Old Oquirrh Bucket | W 71–51 | 27–4 (12–3) | Jon M. Huntsman Center (14,901); Salt Lake City, UT |
| 03/06/2010; 5:00 pm, The Mtn. | No. 14 | at TCU | W 107–77 | 28–4 (13–3) | Daniel-Meyer Coliseum (6,469); Fort Worth, TX |
Mountain West tournament
| 03/11/2010; 7:00 pm, The Mtn. | (2) No. 14 | vs. (7) TCU; MWC Quarterfinals | W 95–85 | 29–4 | Thomas & Mack Center; Paradise, NV |
| 03/12/2010; 9:30 pm, CBSCS | (2) No. 14 | vs. (3) UNLV; MWC Semifinals | L 60–70 | 29–5 | Thomas & Mack Center (18,500); Paradise, NV |
NCAA tournament
| 03/18/2010*; 10:20 am, CBS | (7 W) No. 17 | vs. (10 W) Florida; NCAA First Round | W 99–92 ^{2OT} | 30–5 | Ford Center (13,382); Oklahoma City, OK |
| 03/20/2010*; 6:10 pm, CBS | (7 W) No. 17 | vs. (2 W) No. 7 Kansas State; NCAA Second Round | L 72–84 | 30–6 | Ford Center (15,668); Oklahoma City, OK |
*Non-conference game. ^{#}Rankings from AP Poll. (#) Tournament seedings in parentheses. W=NCAA West Regional. All times are in Mountain Time. Source

== Rankings ==
Ranking movements Legend: ██ Increase in ranking ██ Decrease in ranking — = Not ranked
| | Week | | | | | | | | | | | | | | | | | | | |
| Poll | Pre | 1 | 2 | 3 | 4 | 5 | 6 | 7 | 8 | 9 | 10 | 11 | 12 | 13 | 14 | 15 | 16 | 17 | 18 | Final |
|---|---|---|---|---|---|---|---|---|---|---|---|---|---|---|---|---|---|---|---|---|
| AP | — | — | — | — | — | — | — | — | 25 | 18 | 14 | 12 | 12 | 17 | 16 | 13 | 14 | 14 | 17 | Not released |
| Coaches | — | — | — | — | — | — | — | — | 23 | 17 | 13 | 10 | 12 | 17 | 14 | 11 | 15 | 15 | 16 | 22 |

*AP does not release post-NCAA Tournament rankings
^Coaches did not release a Week 2 poll.
