= 2009–10 UNLV Runnin' Rebels basketball team =

American college basketball season

2009–10 UNLV Runnin' Rebels basketball

NCAA tournament, first round
- Conference: Mountain West Conference
- Record: 25–9 (11–5 Mountain West)
- Head coach: Lon Kruger
- Assistant coaches: Greg Grensing; Steve Henson; Lew Hill
- Home arena: Thomas & Mack Center

2009–10 Mountain West Conference men's basketball standings
	Conf.				Overall
Team	W		L	PCT	W		L	PCT
No. 8 New Mexico	14	–	2	.875	30	–	5	.857
No. 17 BYU	13	–	3	.813	30	–	6	.833
UNLV	11	–	5	.688	25	–	8	.758
San Diego State†	11	–	5	.688	25	–	9	.735
Colorado State	7	–	9	.438	16	–	16	.500
Utah	7	–	9	.438	14	–	17	.452
TCU	5	–	11	.313	13	–	19	.406
Wyoming	3	–	13	.188	10	–	21	.323
Air Force	1	–	15	.063	10	–	21	.323
† Conference tournament winner As of March 20, 2010; Rankings from AP/Coaches Poll

The 2009–10 UNLV Runnin' Rebels basketball team represented the University of Nevada, Las Vegas. The team was coached by Lon Kruger, returning for his sixth year with the Runnin' Rebels. They played their home games at the Thomas & Mack Center on UNLV's main campus in Paradise, Nevada and are a member of the Mountain West Conference. The Runnin' Rebels finished the season 25–9, 11–5 in MWC play. They advanced to the championship game of the 2010 Mountain West Conference men's basketball tournament before losing to San Diego State. They received an at–large bid to the 2010 NCAA Division I men's basketball tournament, earning an 8 seed in the Midwest Region, where they lost to 9 seed Northern Iowa in the first round.

== Preseason ==
=== Recruiting ===
Coach Lon Kruger signed a three-man class for 2008, including the #4 ranked prospect out of Nevada (#66 Rivals, #80 Scout, #85 ESPN), shooting guard Anthony Marshall of North Las Vegas, power forward Carlos Lopez of Henderson and shooting guard Justin Hawkins out of Woodland Hills, California. UNLV also signed power forward Quintrell Thomas, who transferred to UNLV from Kansas.

College recruiting information
Name	Hometown	School	Height	Weight	Commit date
Anthony Marshall; SG	North Las Vegas, Nevada	Mojave (NV)	6 ft 3 in (1.91 m)	185 lb (84 kg)	Aug 14, 2008
Anthony Marshall; SG	Recruit ratings: Scout: Rivals: (91)				
Carlos Lopez; PF	Lajas, Puerto Rico	Findlay College Prep (NV)	6 ft 10 in (2.08 m)	200 lb (91 kg)	Mar 25, 2008
Carlos Lopez; PF	Recruit ratings: Scout: Rivals: (89)				
Justin Hawkins; SG	Woodland Hills, California	Taft (CA)	6 ft 2 in (1.88 m)	170 lb (77 kg)	Sep 30, 2007
Justin Hawkins; SG	Recruit ratings: Scout: Rivals: (80)				
Overall recruit ranking:
Note: In many cases, Scout, Rivals, 247Sports, On3, and ESPN may conflict in their listings of height and weight.; In these cases, the average was taken. ESPN grades are on a 100-point scale.; Sources: "UNLV Basketball Commitments". Rivals.; "2009 UNLV Basketball Commits". Scout.; "ESPN". ESPN.; "Scout.com Team Recruiting Rankings". Scout.; "2009 Team Ranking". Rivals.

== Season ==
=== Non-conference schedule ===
On November 28, 2009, the team defeated #16 Louisville and became ranked nationally the following week. After defeating Arizona in double overtime, 74–72, on December 2, 2009, UNLV marked their first 6–0 start since the 1992–93 season and defeated Santa Clara on December 5 to move to 7–0, their best start since going 34–0 in 1990–91 and losing to Duke in the Final Four. UNLV would raise to #17/18 by the time they took on Kansas State on a neutral court at the Orleans Arena. As in the previous two games, UNLV's sloppy first half play allowed their opponent to jump to an early lead. Unlike in the games against Arizona and Santa Clara, UNLV was unable to move back in front and would lose their first game of the season, 95–80. UNLV's loss to Kansas State would drop them to #23 in the Coaches poll and knock them out of the AP poll all together. The Runnin' Rebels were able to rebound from the loss with a road win at Southern Utah, and home wins against Weber State and South Carolina – Upstate, before heading to Hawai'i for the inaugural Diamond Head Classic.

The Runnin' Rebels would enter the tournament only ranked in the coaches poll at #20. UNLV's first game of tournament would come against SMU. UNLV took control of the game quickly, sprinting out to an 18–4 lead within mere minutes of tip off and never looked back in a 67–53 victory. In the tournament's semifinal, the Rebels would face the tournament host, Hawai'i. Thanks to a relentless defense, UNLV was able to take Hawai'i out of the game early en route to a 77–53 victory, advancing UNLV to the Diamond Head Classic finals versus Southern California. UNLV's offensive might that had helped them to big early leads against SMU and Hawai'i was silenced by a tough USC defense. The Trojans were able to keep the Rebels at bay for most of the game and came away with the 67–56 win and the Diamond Head Classic title. The loss to Southern California would knock UNLV out of the Coaches poll.

=== Conference schedule ===
After eleven days off, UNLV began conference play against #23/25 BYU at the Marriott Center in Provo. Despite leading the Cougars for much of the game, including a six-point lead with less than six minutes to play. Late miscues would doom the Runnin' Rebels, leading to a 77–73 defeat to BYU. The following Saturday, UNLV would travel to The Pit to take on the #13/15 New Mexico Lobos. UNLV was able to keep the sell-out crowd of 14,586 quiet for most of the game, beginning by forcing New Mexico into two turnovers on their first two possessions of the game and jumping to a 9–2 lead. New Mexico would come back, taking over the lead twice in the game, but sophomore guard Kendall Wallace would pace the Rebels, going 7 of 10 on three-pointers as UNLV upset New Mexico 74–62. The Runnin' Rebels had their conference home opener against San Diego State, a team that swept UNLV in their three meetings the previous season. The first half of the game belonged to the bigger and athletically stacked SDSU, taking a 39–33 halftime lead. The Runnin' Rebels however, were able to take control in the second half and came away with a hard-fought 76–66 victory over their rival to improve to 2–1 in the Mountain West and 14–3 overall.

However, thing soon went downhill as UNLV fell to Utah at home, 73–69. The Rebels rebounded and won in both Colorado State and TCU. Returning home, UNLV came from behind to beat Air Force, 60–50.

== Roster ==
#	Name	Height	Weight (lbs.)	Position	Class	Hometown	Previous school
0	Oscar Bellfield	6'2"	185	G	So.	Los Angeles, CA	Westchester HS
1	Quintrell Thomas†	6'8"	245	F	So.	Newark, NJ	Kansas
2	Kendall Wallace	6'4"	190	G	Jr.	Mesa, AZ	Mountain View HS
3	Anthony Marshall	6'3"	200	G	Fr.	Las Vegas, NV	Mojave HS
5	Derrick Jasper	6'6"	215	G	Jr.	Paso Robles, CA	Kentucky
10	Tyler Norman	6'0"	190	G	Jr.	Las Vegas, NV	Iowa State
11	Carlos Lopez	6'11"	215	F	Fr.	Lajas, Puerto Rico	Findlay Prep
12	Brice Massamba	6'10"	240	F/C	So.	Sodertalje, Sweden	Findlay Prep
14	Todd Hanni	6'4"	215	G	So.	Danville, IN	Wabash Valley
15	Mychal Martinez	6'5"	205	F	Jr.	Las Vegas, NV	Yavapai
20	Steve Jones	6'1"	220	G	Sr.	Portland, OR	Arizona State
22	Chase Stanback	6'8"	210	G/C	So.	Los Angeles, CA	UCLA
31	Justin Hawkins	6'3"	190	G	Fr.	Los Angeles, CA	Taft HS
33	Tre'Von Willis	6'4"	195	G	Jr.	Fresno, CA	Memphis
34	Matt Shaw	6'8"	240	F	Jr.	Los Angeles, CA	Fairfax HS
44	Darris Santee	6'8"	225	F	Sr.	Houston, TX	Midland

Notes: † – denotes the player must sit out the 2009–10 season per NCAA transfer rules.

== Rankings ==
Ranking movement Legend: ██ Increase in ranking. ██ Decrease in ranking. ██ Not ranked the previous week. RV–Received Votes
Poll	Pre	Wk 1	Wk 2	Wk 3	Wk 4	Wk 5	Wk 6	Wk 7	Wk 8	Wk 9	Wk 10	Wk 11	Wk 12	Wk 13	Wk 14	Wk 15	Wk 16	Wk 17	Wk 18	Final
AP	–	–	RV	24	18	RV	RV	RV	RV	RV	RV	RV	RV	23	RV	RV	RV	RV	RV	RV
Coaches	RV	RV	RV	21	17	23	20	RV	RV	RV	RV	RV	RV	25	RV	RV	RV	RV	RV	RV

== Schedule and results ==
Date time, TV	Rank^{#}	Opponent^{#}	Result	Record	Site (attendance) city, state
Exhibition
11/10/2009*; 7:00 PM		Washburn	W 62–52	—	Thomas & Mack Center (10,238); Las Vegas, NV
Regular season
11/14/2009*; 7:00 PM		Pittsburg State	W 92–51	1–0	Thomas & Mack Center (14,304); Las Vegas, NV
11/18/2009*; 7:30 PM, The Mtn.		Nevada	W 88–75	2–0	Thomas & Mack Center (13,113); Las Vegas, NV
11/21/2009*; 7:00 PM		Southern Illinois; MWC–MVC Challenge	W 78–69	3–0	Thomas & Mack Center (11,651); Las Vegas, NV
11/25/2009*; 7:00 PM		Holy Cross	W 80–59	4–0	Thomas & Mack Center (10,946); Las Vegas, NV
11/28/2009*; 1:00 PM, Versus		No. 16 Louisville	W 76–71	5–0	Thomas & Mack Center (14,390); Las Vegas, NV
12/02/2009*; 6:00 PM, FSAZ	No. 23	at Arizona	W 74–72 ^{2OT}	6–0	McKale Center (13,485); Tucson, AZ
12/05/2009*; 7:00 PM	No. 23	at Santa Clara	W 66–63	7–0	Leavey Center (2,064); Santa Clara, CA
12/12/2009*; 4:00 PM, FSKC	No. 18	vs. Kansas State	L 80–95	7–1	Orleans Arena (8,320); Las Vegas, NV
12/15/2009*; 6:00 PM		at Southern Utah	W 77–59	8–1	Centrum Arena (4,331); Cedar City, UT
12/17/2009*; 7:00 PM		Weber State	W 72–63	9–1	Thomas & Mack Center (15,715); Las Vegas, NV
12/19/2009*; 7:00 PM		USC Upstate	W 88–58	10–1	Thomas & Mack Center (11,300); Las Vegas, NV
12/22/2009*; 7:30 PM, ESPNU		vs. SMU; Diamond Head Classic Quarterfinals	W 67–53	11–1	Stan Sheriff Center (7,119); Honolulu, HI
12/23/2009*; 8:30 PM, ESPN2		at Hawai'i; Diamond Head Classic semifinals	W 77–53	12–1	Stan Sheriff Center (6,416); Honolulu, HI
12/25/2009*; 6:30 PM, ESPN2		vs. USC; Diamond Head Classic finals	L 56–67	12–2	Stan Sheriff Center (6,172); Honolulu, HI
01/06/2009; 7:00 PM, The Mtn.		at No. 25 BYU	L 73–77	12–3 (0–1)	Marriott Center (15,546); Provo, UT
01/09/2010; 1:00 PM, Versus		at No. 15 New Mexico	W 74–62	13–3 (1–1)	The Pit (14,586); Albuquerque, NM
01/13/2010; 7:00 PM, CBSCS		San Diego State	W 76–66	14–3 (2–1)	Thomas & Mack Center (14,530); Las Vegas, NV
01/16/2010; 7:00 PM, CBSCS		Utah	L 69–73	14–4 (2–2)	Thomas & Mack Center (16,594); Las Vegas, NV
01/20/2010; 7:00 PM, The Mtn.		at Colorado State	W 80–72	15–4 (3–2)	Moby Arena (4,353); Fort Collins, CO
01/23/2010; 3:00 PM, CBSCS		at TCU	W 79–70	16–4 (4–2)	Daniel-Meyer Coliseum (4,270); Fort Worth, TX
01/26/2010; 7:30 PM, The Mtn.		Air Force	W 60–50	17–4 (5–2)	Thomas & Mack Center (14,175); Las Vegas, NV
02/03/2010; 7:00 PM, The Mtn.		at Wyoming	W 78–50	18–4 (6–2)	Arena-Auditorium (4,718); Laramie, WY
02/06/2010; 1:00 PM, Versus		No. 12 BYU	W 88–74	19–4 (7–2)	Thomas & Mack Center (18,557); Las Vegas, NV
02/10/2010; 8:00 PM, CBSCS	No. 23	No. 15 New Mexico	L 66–76	19–5 (7–3)	Thomas & Mack Center (18,044); Las Vegas, NV
02/13/2010; 1:00 PM, Versus	No. 23	at San Diego State	L 58–68	19–6 (7–4)	Viejas Arena (9,224); San Diego, CA
02/17/2010; 7:00 PM, The Mtn.		at Utah	L 61–66	19–7 (7–5)	Jon M. Huntsman Center (9,122); Salt Lake City, UT
02/20/2010; 3:00 PM, CBSCS		Colorado State	W 70–39	20–7 (8–5)	Thomas & Mack Center (13,626); Las Vegas, NV
02/24/2010; 8:00 PM, The Mtn.		TCU	W 78–62	21–7 (9–5)	Thomas & Mack Center (11,408); Las Vegas, NV
02/27/2010; 12:30 PM, The Mtn.		at Air Force	W 77–47	22–7 (10–5)	Clune Arena (2,430); Colorado Springs, CO
03/06/2010; 1:00 PM, Versus		Wyoming	W 74–56	23–7 (11–5)	Thomas & Mack Center (14,116); Las Vegas, NV
Mountain West tournament
03/11/2010; 8:30 PM, The Mtn.	(3)	vs. (6) Utah; MWC Quarterfinals	W 73–61	24–7	Thomas & Mack Center (12,405); Las Vegas, NV
03/12/2010; 8:30 PM, CBSCS	(3)	vs. (2) No. 14 BYU; MWC Semifinals	W 70–66	25–7	Thomas & Mack Center (18,500); Las Vegas, NV
03/13/2010; 4:00 PM, Versus	(3)	vs. (4) San Diego State; MWC Championship Game	L 45–55	25–8	Thomas & Mack Center (12,728); Las Vegas, NV
NCAA tournament
03/18/2010*; 4:10 PM, CBS	(8 MW)	vs. (9 MW) No. 24 Northern Iowa; NCAA First Round	L 66–69	25–9	Ford Center; Oklahoma City, OK
*Non-conference game. ^{#}Rankings from AP Poll. (#) Tournament seedings in parentheses. MW=NCAA Midwest Regional. All times are in Pacific Time.
