= 2009–10 San Diego State Aztecs men's basketball team =

American college basketball season

2009–10 San Diego State Aztecs men's basketball
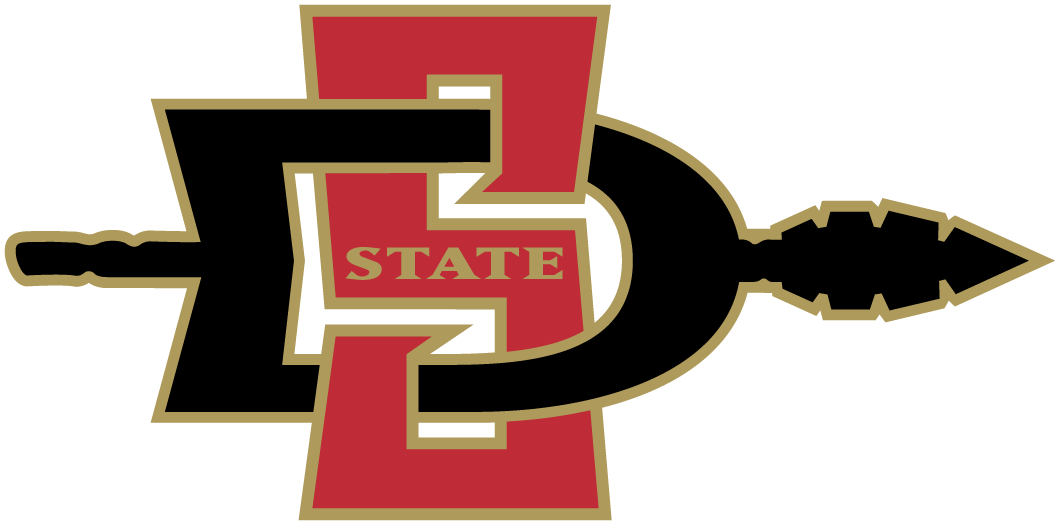

Mountain West Tournament Champions

NCAA tournament, Round of 64
- Conference: Mountain West Conference
- Record: 25–9 (11–5 Mountain West)
- Head coach: Steve Fisher
- Associate head coach: Brian Dutcher
- Assistant coaches: Justin Hutson (4th season); Mark Fisher
- Home arena: Viejas Arena

2009–10 Mountain West Conference men's basketball standings
	Conf.				Overall
Team	W		L	PCT	W		L	PCT
No. 8 New Mexico	14	–	2	.875	30	–	5	.857
No. 17 BYU	13	–	3	.813	30	–	6	.833
UNLV	11	–	5	.688	25	–	8	.758
San Diego State†	11	–	5	.688	25	–	9	.735
Colorado State	7	–	9	.438	16	–	16	.500
Utah	7	–	9	.438	14	–	17	.452
TCU	5	–	11	.313	13	–	19	.406
Wyoming	3	–	13	.188	10	–	21	.323
Air Force	1	–	15	.063	10	–	21	.323
† Conference tournament winner As of March 20, 2010; Rankings from AP/Coaches Poll

The 2009–10 San Diego State men's basketball team represented San Diego State University in the 2009–10 college basketball season. This was head coach Steve Fisher's eleventh season at San Diego State. The Aztecs competed in the Mountain West Conference and played their home games at Viejas Arena. They finished the season 25–9, 11–5 in MWC play. They won the 2010 Mountain West Conference men's basketball tournament to earn the conference's automatic bid to the 2010 NCAA Division I men's basketball tournament. They earned an 11 seed in the Midwest Region and were defeated by 6 seed and AP #15 Tennessee in the first round.

== Off Season ==
=== Departures ===
Name	Number	Pos.	Height	Weight	Year	Hometown	Notes
Ryan Amoroso	43	F	6'8"	263	Senior	Burnsville, Minnesota	Graduated
Tim Island	2	G	6'4"	207	Senior	San Diego, California	Graduated
Kyle Spain	15	F	6'5"	220	Senior	Newark, California	Graduated
Matt Thomas	21	G	6'4"	213	Senior	Riverside, California	Graduated
Lorenzo Wade	31	F	6'6"	225	Senior	Hawthorne, California	Graduated
Richie Williams	3	G	5'10"	162	Senior	San Diego, California	Graduated
Bryce Smith	25	G	6'3"	200	Freshman	Woodland Hills, California	Elected to transfer.

=== Incoming transfers ===
Name	Number	Pos.	Height	Weight	Year	Hometown	Notes
James Rahon	11	G	6'5"	202	Sophomore	San Diego, California	Elected to transfer from Santa Clara. Rahon will redshirt for the 2009–10 season, under NCAA transfer rules. Will have three years of eligibility.

=== 2009 Recruiting Class ===
College recruiting information
Name	Hometown	School	Height	Weight	Commit date
Kawhi Leonard; SF	Riverside, CA	Martin Luther King High School	6 ft 7 in (2.01 m)	210 lb (95 kg)	Oct 22, 2008
Kawhi Leonard; SF	Recruit ratings: Scout: Rivals: (92)				
Eric Lawton; SG	Hemet, CA	West Valley High School	6 ft 1 in (1.85 m)	160 lb (73 kg)	Jun 27, 2008
Eric Lawton; SG	Recruit ratings: Scout: Rivals: (90)				
Chase Tapley; SG	Sacramento, CA	Sacramento High School	6 ft 2 in (1.88 m)	180 lb (82 kg)	Sep 25, 2008
Chase Tapley; SG	Recruit ratings: Scout: Rivals: (85)				
Alec Williams; PF	San Juan Capistrano, CA	Junipero Serra Catholic High School	6 ft 5 in (1.96 m)	230 lb (100 kg)	Jun 13, 2008
Alec Williams; PF	Recruit ratings: Scout: Rivals: (80)				
Malcolm Thomas; PF	San Diego, CA	San Diego City College	6 ft 9 in (2.06 m)	220 lb (100 kg)	Nov 12, 2008
Malcolm Thomas; PF	Recruit ratings: Scout: Rivals: (JC)				
Overall recruit ranking:
Note: In many cases, Scout, Rivals, 247Sports, On3, and ESPN may conflict in their listings of height and weight.; In these cases, the average was taken. ESPN grades are on a 100-point scale.; Sources: "2009 Team Ranking". Rivals.

== Preseason ==
In the Mountain West preseason polls, released October 6 at The Mtn. studios in Denver, CO, San Diego State was selected to finish second in the media poll. Jr. Billy White was selected to the preseason MWC first team. Fr. Kawhi Leonard was selected as the preseason freshman of the year.

== Roster ==
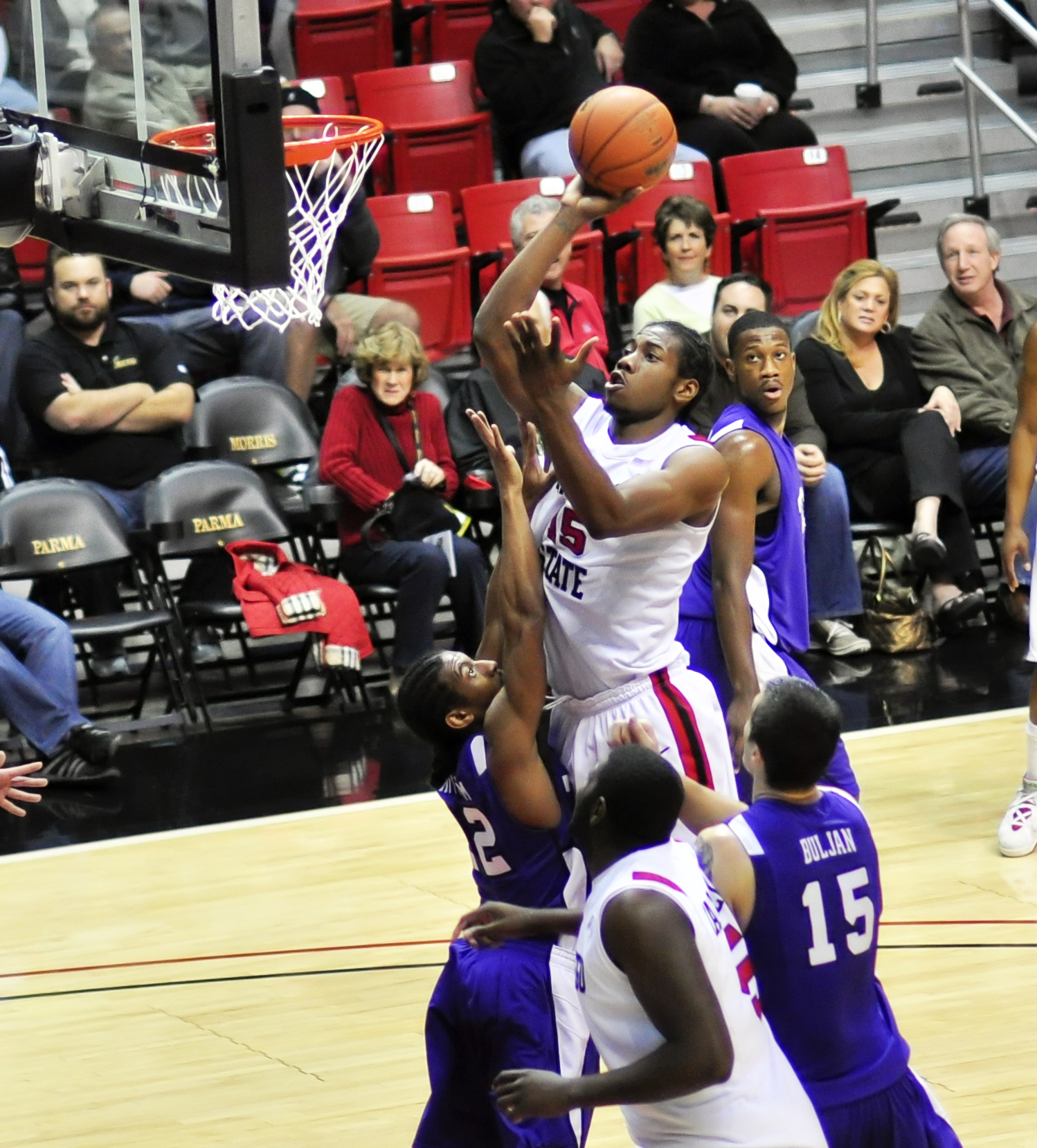
Kawhi Leonard

#	Name	Height	Weight (lbs.)	Position	Class	Hometown	Previous Team(s)
0	Alec Williams	6'6"	268	F	Fr.	San Juan Capistrano, CA	JSerra HS
3	Tyrone Shelley	6'6"	225	G	So.	San Diego, CA	Crawford HS; Pepperdine
4	Malcolm Thomas	6'9"	215	F	Jr.	San Diego, CA	Crawford HS; San Diego City College
5	Brian Carlwell	6'11"	297	C	Jr.	Maywood, IL	Proviso East HS; Illinois
11	James Rahon	6'5"	202	G	So.	San Diego, CA	Torrey Pines HS; Santa Clara
15	Kawhi Leonard	6'7"	225	F	Fr.	Riverside, CA	King HS
20	Jason Deutchman	6'6"	220	G	Jr.	Los Angeles, CA	Santa Monica HS; UW–Milwaukee
22	Chase Tapley	6'2"	205	G	Fr.	Sacramento, CA	Sacramento HS
23	D.J. Gay	6'0"	167	G	Jr.	Sun Valley, CA	Poly HS
24	Tim Shelton	6'7"	248	F	So.	Fresno, CA	Clovis West HS
32	Billy White	6'8"	235	F	Jr.	Las Vegas, NV	Green Valley HS
40	Kelvin Davis	6'3"	220	G	Sr.	Waterbury, CT	Sacred Heart HS; College of Southern Idaho
42	Mehdi Cheriet	6'9"	218	F	Sr.	Tarare, France	Albert Thomas HS; Arizona Western

== Schedule and results ==
Date time, TV	Rank^{#}	Opponent^{#}	Result	Record	Site (attendance) city, state
Exhibition
11/03/2009*; 7:00pm		California Baptist	W 72–57	—	Viejas Arena (4,365); San Diego, CA
11/10/2009*; 7:00pm		Point Loma Nazarene	W 89–56	—	Viejas Arena (4,807); San Diego, CA
Regular Season
11/14/2009*; 2:00pm		UC San Diego	W 77–52	1–0	Viejas Arena (5,520); San Diego, CA
11/16/2009*; 11:00pm, ESPN		at Saint Mary's; ESPN College Hoops Tip-Off Marathon	L 58–80	1–1	McKeon Pavilion (2,774); Moraga, CA
11/19/2009*; 7:00pm		Santa Clara; West Coast Classic	W 86–53	2–1	Viejas Arena (5,401); San Diego, CA
11/23/2009*; 7:00pm		at Fresno State; West Coast Classic	W 62–58	3–1	Save Mart Center (8,041); Fresno, CA
11/25/2009*; 7:00pm, Big West TV		at Pacific; West Coast Classic	L 63–71	3–2	Alex G. Spanos Center (2,705); Stockton, CA
11/28/2009*; 3:00pm		Northern Arizona; West Coast Classic	W 89–48	4–2	Viejas Arena (4,390); San Diego, CA
12/02/2009*; 7:05pm, 4SD		at San Diego; City Championship	W 69–62 ^{OT}	5–2	Jenny Craig Pavilion (4,662); San Diego, CA
12/05/2009*; 7:00pm		at UC Santa Barbara	W 69–61	6–2	The Thunderdome (2,513); Santa Barbara, CA
12/09/2009*; 7:00pm		Cal State Fullerton	W 82–68	7–2	Viejas Arena (4,774); San Diego, CA
12/12/2009*; 7:00pm, The Mtn.		Arizona	W 63–46	8–2	Viejas Arena (12,414); San Diego, CA
12/19/2009*; 3:30pm, FSAZ		at Arizona State	L 52–55	8–3	Wells Fargo Arena (10,055); Tempe, AZ
12/22/2009*; 6:05pm		at Drake; MWC–MVC Challenge	W 76–73 ^{OT}	9–3	Knapp Center (4,012); Des Moines, IA
12/29/2009*; 7:00pm		UC Riverside	W 58–53	10–3	Viejas Arena (5,315); San Diego, CA
12/31/2009*; 1:00pm		Pomona-Pitzer	W 89–54	11–3	Viejas Arena (4,061); San Diego, CA
01/05/2010; 7:30pm, The Mtn.		No. 15 New Mexico	W 74–64	12–3 (1–0)	Viejas Arena (7,558); San Diego, CA
01/09/2010; 3:00pm, The Mtn.		at Wyoming	L 83–85	12–4 (1–1)	Arena-Auditorium (4,826); Laramie, WY
01/13/2010; 7:05pm, CBSCS		at UNLV	L 66–76	12–5 (1–2)	Thomas & Mack Center (14,530); Paradise, NV
01/16/2010; 7:00pm, The Mtn.		TCU	W 67–62	13–5 (2–2)	Viejas Arena (5,871); San Diego, CA
01/19/2010; 7:00pm, The Mtn.		at Utah	W 70–68	14–5 (3–2)	Jon M. Huntsman Center (8,520); Salt Lake City, UT
01/23/2010; 7:00pm, The Mtn.		No. 14 BYU	L 69–71	14–6 (3–3)	Viejas Arena (12,414); San Diego, CA
01/30/2010; 3:00pm, The Mtn.		at Colorado State	W 64–52	15–6 (4–3)	Moby Arena (3,809); Fort Collins, CO
02/02/2010; 7:00pm, CBSCS		Air Force	W 70–48	16–6 (5–3)	Viejas Arena (6,126); San Diego, CA
02/06/2010; 3:00pm, The Mtn.		at No. 15 New Mexico	L 86–88 ^{OT}	16–7 (5–4)	The Pit (14,586); Albuquerque, NM
02/10/2010; 7:30pm, The Mtn.		Wyoming	W 88–57	17–7 (6–4)	Viejas Arena (6,606); San Diego, CA
02/13/2010; 7:00pm, Versus		No. 23 UNLV	W 68–58	18–7 (7–4)	Viejas Arena (9,224); San Diego, CA
02/16/2010; 5:00pm, The Mtn.		at TCU	W 68–51	19–7 (8–4)	Daniel-Meyer Coliseum (3,615); Fort Worth, TX
02/20/2010; 6:00pm, The Mtn.		Utah	W 68–61	20–7 (9–4)	Viejas Arena (10,695); San Diego, CA
02/24/2010; 6:00pm, CBSCS		at No. 13 BYU	L 68–82	20–8 (9–5)	Marriott Center (20,124); Provo, UT
03/03/2010; 7:30pm, The Mtn.		Colorado State	W 68–55	21–8 (10–5)	Viejas Arena (8,043); San Diego, CA
03/06/2010; 6:00pm, The Mtn.		at Air Force	W 61–42	22–8 (11–5)	Clune Arena (3,352); Colorado Springs, CO
Mountain West tournament
03/11/2010; 2:30pm, The Mtn.	(4)	vs. (5) Colorado State; MWC Quarterfinals	W 72–71	23–8	Thomas & Mack Center (11,031); Paradise, NV
03/12/2010; 6:00pm, CBSCS	(4)	vs. (1) No. 8 New Mexico; MWC Semifinals	W 72–69	24–8	Thomas & Mack Center; Paradise, NV
03/13/2010; 4:00pm, Versus	(4)	at (3) UNLV; MWC Championship Game	W 55–45	25–8	Thomas & Mack Center (12,728); Paradise, NV
NCAA tournament
03/18/2010*; 6:45pm, CBS	(11 MW)	vs. (6 MW) No. 15 Tennessee; NCAA First Round	L 59–62	25–9	Dunkin Donuts Center (10,788); Providence, RI
*Non-conference game. ^{#}Rankings from AP Poll. (#) Tournament seedings in parentheses. MW=NCAA Midwest Regional. All times are in Pacific Time. Source

== See also ==
- San Diego State Aztecs
- 2009–10 MWC men's basketball season
