= 2009–10 Utah Utes men's basketball team =

American college basketball season

2009–10 Utah Utes men's basketball
- Conference: Mountain West Conference
- Record: 14–17 (7–9 Mountain West)
- Head coach: Jim Boylen (3rd year)
- Assistant coaches: Jeff Smith; Barret Peery; Stan Johnson
- Home arena: Jon M. Huntsman Center

2009–10 Mountain West Conference men's basketball standings
	Conf.				Overall
Team	W		L	PCT	W		L	PCT
No. 8 New Mexico	14	–	2	.875	30	–	5	.857
No. 17 BYU	13	–	3	.813	30	–	6	.833
UNLV	11	–	5	.688	25	–	8	.758
San Diego State†	11	–	5	.688	25	–	9	.735
Colorado State	7	–	9	.438	16	–	16	.500
Utah	7	–	9	.438	14	–	17	.452
TCU	5	–	11	.313	13	–	19	.406
Wyoming	3	–	13	.188	10	–	21	.323
Air Force	1	–	15	.063	10	–	21	.323
† Conference tournament winner As of March 20, 2010; Rankings from AP/Coaches Poll

The 2009–10 Utah Utes men's basketball team represented the University of Utah. They played their home games at the Jon M. Huntsman Center in Salt Lake City, Utah, United States, and were a member of the Mountain West Conference. The Utes were led by third-year head coach Jim Boylen. They finished the season 14–17 (7–9 in Mountain West play) and lost in the quarterfinals of the 2010 Mountain West Conference men's basketball tournament to UNLV.

== Roster ==
#	Name	Position	Height	Weight (lbs.)	Class	Hometown
0	Chris Hines	G	6–1	195	RS Freshman	Houston, TX
1	Jay Watkins	F	6–8	215	RS Senior	Memphis, TN
2	Chris Kupets	G	6–0	175	Junior	Athens, GA
3	Preston Guiot	G	6–0	185	Freshman	Bolivar, MO
5	Jace Tavita	G	6–4	205	Junior	Salt Lake City, UT
10	Antonio DiMaria	G/F	6–6	195	RS Junior	Pittsburgh, PA
11	Dominique Lee	G	6–4	205	Freshman	Oakland, CA
15	Josh Watkins	G	6–0	200	Junior	New York City, NY
20	J. J. O'Brien	G/F	6–7	215	Freshman	Rancho Cucamonga, CA
21	Will Clyburn	G/F	6–7	200	Junior	Detroit, MI
25	Josh Fuller	G/F	6–7	210	Freshman	Rexburg, ID
32	Shawn Glover	G/F	6–7	195	Sophomore	Cedar Hill, TX
41	Neal Monson	C	6–10	220	Freshman	Sandy, UT
42	Jason Washburn	C	7–0	230	RS Sophomore	Battle Creek, MI
51	David Foster	C	7–3	255	Junior	Lake Forest, CA

== Schedule and results ==
Date time, TV	Rank^{#}	Opponent^{#}	Result	Record	Site (attendance) city, state
Exhibition
11/07/2009*; 12:00 PM		Findlay	W 83–70	—	Jon M. Huntsman Center; Salt Lake City, UT
Regular season
11/13/2009*; 7:00 PM		Idaho	L 87–94	0–1	Jon M. Huntsman Center (8,127); Salt Lake City, UT
11/18/2009*; 6:00 PM, The Mtn.		Utah State; Old Oquirrh Bucket	W 68–67	1–1	Jon M. Huntsman Center (9,699); Salt Lake City, UT
11/21/2009*; 7:00 PM		Southern; Las Vegas Invitational	W 88–48	2–1	Jon M. Huntsman Center (7,739); Salt Lake City, UT
11/24/2009*; 7:00 PM		Seattle; Las Vegas Invitational	L 74–77	2–2	Jon M. Huntsman Center (7,856); Salt Lake City, UT
11/27/2009*; 8:30 PM		vs. No. 21 Illinois; Las Vegas Invitational semifinals	W 60–58	3–2	Orleans Arena (3,500); Paradise, NV
11/28/2009*; 8:30 PM		vs. Oklahoma State; Las Vegas Invitational championship	L 55–77	3–3	Orleans Arena (3,500); Paradise, NV
12/02/2009*; 7:00 PM		at Weber State; Old Oquirrh Bucket	L 76–83	3–4	Dee Events Center (5,779); Ogden, UT
12/05/2009*; 7:00 PM		Idaho State	W 68–56	4–4	Jon M. Huntsman Center (8,269); Salt Lake City, UT
12/09/2009*; 7:00 PM, CBSCS		Michigan	W 68–52	5–4	Jon M. Huntsman Center (9,227); Salt Lake City, UT
12/12/2009*; 2:00 PM, Versus		Oklahoma	L 73–78 ^{OT}	5–5	Jon M. Huntsman Center (9,268); Salt Lake City, UT
12/19/2009*; 4:00 PM, The Mtn.		Illinois State; MWC–MVC Challenge	L 63–73	5–6	Jon M. Huntsman Center (8,403); Salt Lake City, UT
12/23/2009*; 8:00 PM		at Pepperdine	L 64–76	5–7	Firestone Fieldhouse (612); Malibu, CA
12/29/2009*; 7:00 PM		UTSA	W 69–47	6–7	Jon M. Huntsman Center (8,412); Salt Lake City, UT
01/02/2010*; 6:00 PM, CSS		at LSU	W 61–59	7–7	Maravich Center (8,631); Baton Rouge, LA
01/09/2010; 1:30 PM, The Mtn.		TCU	W 65–45	8–7 (1–0)	Jon M. Huntsman Center (8,694); Salt Lake City, UT
01/13/2010; 8:00 PM, The Mtn.		at New Mexico	L 57–74	8–8 (1–1)	The Pit (13,501); Albuquerque, NM
01/16/2010; 8:00 PM, CBSCS		at UNLV	W 73–69	9–8 (2–1)	Thomas & Mack Center (16,594); Paradise, NV
01/19/2010; 8:00 PM, The Mtn.		San Diego State	L 68–70	9–9 (2–2)	Jon M. Huntsman Center (8,520); Salt Lake City, UT
01/23/2010; 4:00 PM, The Mtn.		Air Force	W 71–54	10–9 (3–2)	Jon M. Huntsman Center (10,011); Salt Lake City, UT
01/27/2010; 7:00 PM		at Wyoming	L 69–75	10–10 (3–3)	Arena-Auditorium (4,828); Laramie, WY
01/30/2010; 7:00 PM, The Mtn.		at BYU; Rivalry	L 69–82	10–11 (3–4)	Marriott Center (22,644); Provo, UT
02/03/2010; 6:00 PM, The Mtn.		Colorado State	L 50–65	10–12 (3–5)	Jon M. Huntsman Center (8,110); Salt Lake City, UT
02/10/2010; 6:00 PM, The Mtn.		at TCU	W 64–55	11–12 (4–5)	Daniel–Meyer Coliseum (4,414); Fort Worth, TX
02/13/2010; 7:00 PM, The Mtn.		No. 15 New Mexico	L 65–68 ^{OT}	11–13 (4–6)	Jon M. Huntsman Center (9,933); Salt Lake City, UT
02/17/2010; 8:00 PM, The Mtn.		UNLV	W 66–61	12–13 (5–6)	Jon M. Huntsman Center (9,122); Salt Lake City, UT
02/20/2010; 7:00 PM, The Mtn.		at San Diego State	L 61–68	12–14 (5–7)	Viejas Arena (10,695); San Diego, CA
02/24/2010; 6:00 PM, The Mtn.		at Air Force	W 54–43	13–14 (6–7)	Clune Arena (1,862); Colorado Springs, CO
02/27/2010; 4:00 PM, The Mtn.		Wyoming	W 74–64	14–14 (7–7)	Jon M. Huntsman Center (10,138); Salt Lake City, UT
03/03/2010; 7:00 PM, CBSCS		No. 14 BYU; Rivalry	L 51–71	14–15 (7–8)	Jon M. Huntsman Center (14,901); Salt Lake City, UT
03/06/2010; 1:30 PM, The Mtn.		at Colorado State	L 65–78	14–16 (7–9)	Moby Arena (3,832); Fort Collins, CO
Mountain West tournament
03/11/2010; 9:30 PM, The Mtn.	(6)	vs. (3) UNLV; MWC Quarterfinals	L 61–73	14–17	Thomas & Mack Center (12,405); Paradise, NV
*Non-conference game. ^{#}Rankings from AP Poll. (#) Tournament seedings in parentheses. All times are in Mountain Time.
