= 2009–10 Colorado State Rams men's basketball team =

American college basketball season

2009–10 Colorado State Rams men's basketball
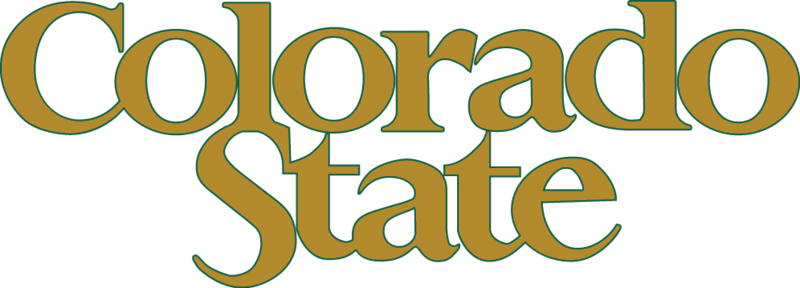

CBI, First Round
- Conference: Mountain West Conference
- Record: 16–16 (7–9 MW)
- Head coach: Tim Miles (3rd season)
- Assistant coaches: Niko Medved (3rd season); Craig Smith (3rd season); DeMarlo Slocum (3rd season)
- Home arena: Moby Arena

2009–10 Mountain West Conference men's basketball standings
	Conf.				Overall
Team	W		L	PCT	W		L	PCT
No. 8 New Mexico	14	–	2	.875	30	–	5	.857
No. 17 BYU	13	–	3	.813	30	–	6	.833
UNLV	11	–	5	.688	25	–	8	.758
San Diego State†	11	–	5	.688	25	–	9	.735
Colorado State	7	–	9	.438	16	–	16	.500
Utah	7	–	9	.438	14	–	17	.452
TCU	5	–	11	.313	13	–	19	.406
Wyoming	3	–	13	.188	10	–	21	.323
Air Force	1	–	15	.063	10	–	21	.323
† Conference tournament winner As of March 20, 2010; Rankings from AP/Coaches Poll

The 2009–10 Colorado State Rams men's basketball team represented Colorado State University in the 2009–10 NCAA Division I men's basketball season. The Rams were led by head coach Tim Miles in his third year leading the team. Colorado State played their home games at Moby Arena in Fort Collins, Colorado, as members of the Mountain West Conference.

The Rams finished conference play with a 7–9 record, earning the fifth seed in the Mountain West tournament. Colorado State lost in the quarterfinals of the MWC tournament to eventual tournament champion San Diego State.

Colorado State failed to qualify for the NCAA tournament, but were invited to the 2010 College Basketball Invitational. The Rams were eliminated in the first round of the CBI by Morehead State, 74–60.

The Rams finished the season with a 16–16 record.

== Roster ==
2009–10 Colorado State Rams men's basketball team
Players
Coaches

Pos.	#	Name	Height	Weight	Year	Hometown
F	0	Mame Ba	6 ft 9 in (2.06 m)	245 lb (111 kg)	Sr	Dakar, Senegal
F	1	Travis Franklin	6 ft 7 in (2.01 m)	215 lb (98 kg)	Jr	Baton Rouge, Louisiana
G	2	Wes Eikmeier	6 ft 3 in (1.91 m)	175 lb (79 kg)	So	Fremont, Nebraska
F	4	Pierce Hornung	6 ft 5 in (1.96 m)	200 lb (91 kg)	Fr	Arvada, Colorado
G	5	Johnny Bene	6 ft 1 in (1.85 m)	175 lb (79 kg)	Jr	Clayton, California
F	10	Travis Busch	6 ft 4 in (1.93 m)	220 lb (100 kg)	Sr	Mounds View, Minnesota
G	11	Jesse Carr	6 ft 2 in (1.88 m)	180 lb (82 kg)	So	Ainsworth, Nebraska
G	12	Adam Nigon	6 ft 3 in (1.91 m)	175 lb (79 kg)	Jr	Broomfield, Colorado
F	13	Andre McFarland	6 ft 6 in (1.98 m)	225 lb (102 kg)	Jr	Las Vegas, Nevada
G	15	Mike Annese	6 ft 1 in (1.85 m)	155 lb (70 kg)	Sr	Littleton, Colorado
G	20	Harvey Perry	6 ft 5 in (1.96 m)	205 lb (93 kg)	Sr	Las Vegas, Nevada
G	22	Dorian Green	6 ft 2 in (1.88 m)	170 lb (77 kg)	Fr	Lawrence, Kansas
C	23	Trevor Williams	7 ft 0 in (2.13 m)	270 lb (122 kg)	Fr	Denver, Colorado
F	32	Andy Ogide	6 ft 9 in (2.06 m)	245 lb (111 kg)	Jr	Marietta, Georgia
F	33	Michael Lebsack	6 ft 4 in (1.93 m)	190 lb (86 kg)	Sr	Yuma, Colorado
G	40	Arin Dunn	6 ft 1 in (1.85 m)	185 lb (84 kg)	Sr	Broomfield, Colorado
F	44	Greg Smith	6 ft 6 in (1.98 m)	200 lb (91 kg)	Fr	Omaha, Nebraska

Head coach

- Tim Miles (Mary)

Assistant coach(es)

- Niko Medved (Minnesota)
- Craig Smith (North Dakota)
- DeMarlo Slocum (Georgia Southern)

Legend

- (C) Team captain
- (S) Suspended
- (I) Ineligible
- (W) Walk-on
- Injured
- Current redshirt

Roster
Last update: February 14, 2023

== Schedule and results ==
Date time, TV	Rank^{#}	Opponent^{#}	Result	Record	Site (attendance) city, state
Exhibition
November 3, 2009*; 7:00 pm		Regis	W 74–65	—	Moby Arena; Fort Collins, CO
November 7, 2009*; 5:00 pm		Western State	W 64–50	—	Moby Arena; Fort Collins, CO
Regular season
November 13, 2009*; 5:30 pm		vs. UC Davis; BTI Tip-Off Tournament	W 91–73	1–0	McArthur Court (6,872); Eugene, OR
November 14, 2009*; 5:15 pm		vs. Winston-Salem State; BTI Tip-Off Tournament	W 57–40	2–0	McArthur Court (6,748); Eugene, OR
November 15, 2009*; 4:30 pm		at Oregon; BTI Tip-Off Tournament	L 55–68	2–1	McArthur Court (6,769); Eugene, OR
November 20, 2009*; 5:00 pm		at Indiana State; MWC–MVC Challenge	L 60–65	2–2	Hulman Center (4,308); Terre Haute, IN
November 24, 2009*; 7:00 pm		Mayville State	W 79–42	3–2	Moby Arena (1,969); Fort Collins, CO
November 29, 2009*; 2:00 pm		San Francisco	W 91–75 ^{2OT}	4–2	Moby Arena (2,203); Fort Collins, CO
December 1, 2009*; 7:00 pm		at Northern Colorado	L 63–70	4–3	Butler–Hancock Athletic Center (3,192); Greeley, CO
December 5, 2009*; 7:00 pm		Denver	W 64–59	5–3	Moby Arena (2,569); Fort Collins, CO
December 10, 2009*; 7:30 pm		Colorado	W 77–62	6–3	Moby Arena (5,293); Fort Collins, CO
December 12, 2009*; 7:00 pm		Montana	W 62–61	7–3	Moby Arena (2,498); Fort Collins, CO
December 20, 2009*; 6:00 pm		Northern Arizona	W 64–56	8–3	Moby Arena (2,419); Fort Collins, CO
December 22, 2009*; 8:30 pm		at UCLA	L 63–75	8–4	Pauley Pavilion (6,755); Los Angeles, CA
December 28, 2009*; 8:00 pm		at Fresno State	L 50–73	8–5	Save Mart Center (7,425); Fresno, CA
December 31, 2009*; 2:00 pm		Yale	W 93–71	9–5	Moby Arena (2,498); Fort Collins, CO
January 6, 2010; 6:00 pm		at Wyoming; Border War	W 83–73	10–5 (1–0)	Arena-Auditorium (4,397); Laramie, WY
January 9, 2010; 7:00 pm		Air Force	W 70–48	11–5 (2–0)	Moby Arena (3,207); Fort Collins, CO
January 16, 2010; 7:00 pm		at No. 18 BYU	L 47–91	11–6 (2–1)	Marriott Center (20,155); Provo, UT
January 20, 2010; 8:00 pm		UNLV	L 72–80	11–7 (2–2)	Moby Arena (4,353); Fort Collins, CO
January 23, 2010; 1:30 pm		at New Mexico	L 64–82	11–8 (2–3)	The Pit (13,707); Albuquerque, NM
January 27, 2010; 6:00 pm		TCU	W 63–57	12–8 (3–3)	Moby Arena (2,910); Fort Collins, CO
January 30, 2010; 4:00 pm		San Diego State	L 52–64	12–9 (3–4)	Moby Arena (3,809); Fort Collins, CO
February 3, 2010; 6:00 pm		at Utah	W 65–50	13–9 (4–4)	Jon M. Huntsman Center (8,110); Salt Lake City, UT
February 6, 2010; 7:00 pm		Wyoming; Border War	W 80–64	14–9 (5–4)	Moby Arena (5,277); Fort Collins, CO
February 9, 2010; 8:00 pm		at Air Force	W 51–47	15–9 (6–4)	Clune Arena (1,709); Colorado Springs, CO
February 17, 2010; 6:00 pm		No. 16 BYU	L 70–92	15–10 (6–5)	Moby Arena (3,738); Fort Collins, CO
February 20, 2010; 4:00 pm		at UNLV	L 39–70	15–11 (6–6)	Thomas & Mack Center (13,626); Paradise, NV
February 23, 2010; 8:00 pm		No. 10 New Mexico	L 66–72	15–12 (6–7)	Moby Arena (4,303); Fort Collins, CO
February 27, 2010; 6:30 pm		at TCU	L 67–73	15–13 (6–8)	Daniel–Meyer Coliseum (4,887); Fort Worth, TX
March 3, 2010; 8:30 pm		at San Diego State	L 55–68	15–14 (6–9)	Viejas Arena (8,043); San Diego, CA
March 6, 2010; 1:30 pm		Utah	W 76–67	16–14 (7–9)	Moby Arena (3,832); Fort Collins, CO
Mountain West tournament
March 11, 2010; 3:30 pm	(5)	vs. (4) San Diego State; MWC Quarterfinals	L 71–72	16–15	Thomas & Mack Center (11,031); Las Vegas, NV
CBI
March 17, 2010; 7:00 pm		at Morehead State; CBI First Round	L 60–74	16–16	Ellis Johnson Arena (1,612); Morehead, KY
*Non-conference game. ^{#}Rankings from AP Poll. (#) Tournament seedings in parentheses. All times are in Mountain Time. Source
