= Darington Hobson =

American basketball player

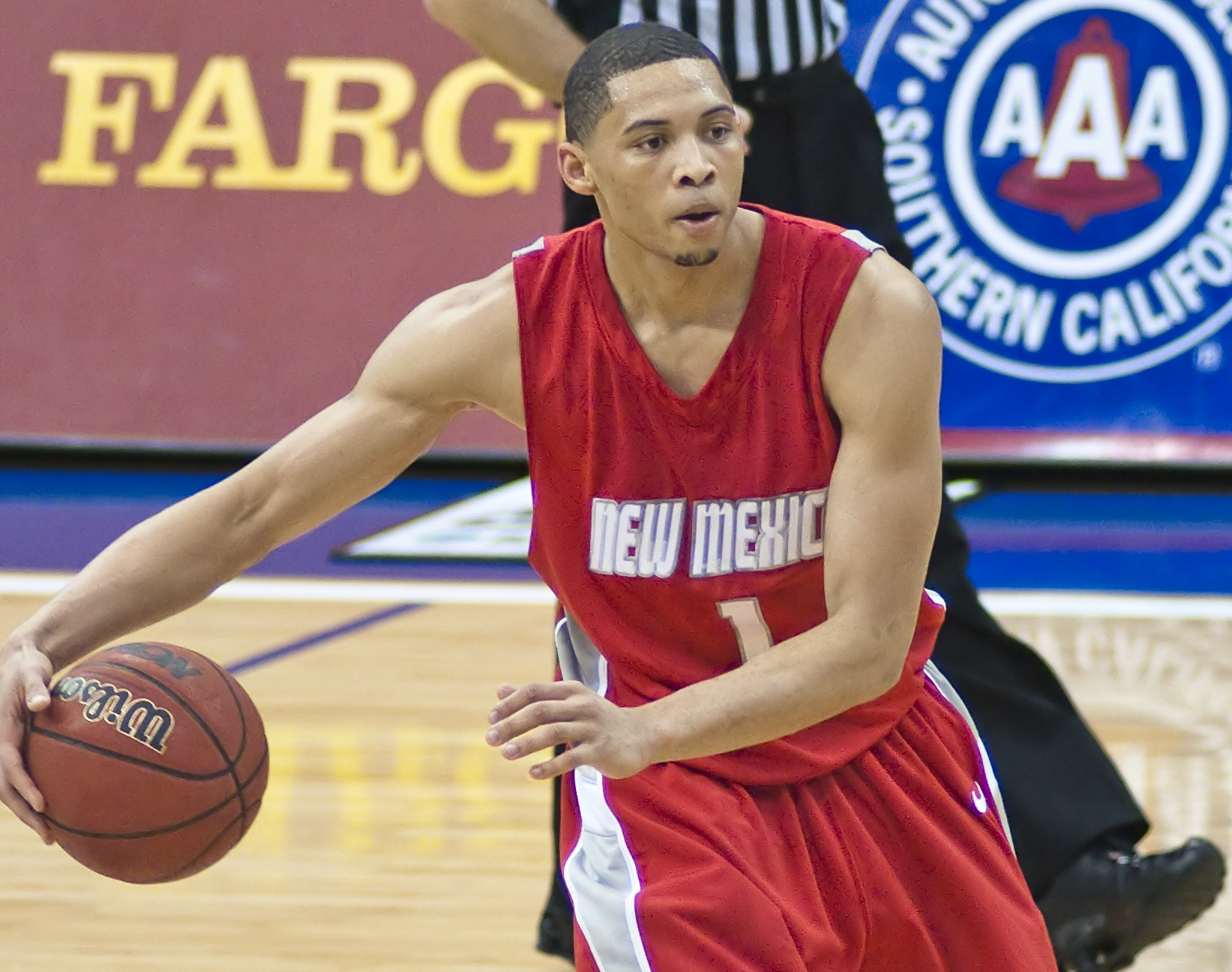
- Hobson with the New Mexico Lobos in 2009

Personal information
- Born: September 29, 1987 (age 39) Las Vegas, Nevada, U.S.
- Listed height: 6 ft 7 in (2.01 m)
- Listed weight: 207 lb (94 kg)

Career information
- High school: Western (Las Vegas, Nevada); Alief Hastings (Houston, Texas); Gulf Shores Academy (Houston, Texas); Calvary Christian (San Fernando, California); Decatur Christian (Decatur, Illinois)
- College: USU Eastern (2007–2009); New Mexico (2009–2010)
- NBA draft: 2010: 2nd round, 37th overall pick
- Drafted by: Milwaukee Bucks
- Playing career: 2010–2024
- Position: Shooting guard / small forward

Career history
- 2011–2012: Milwaukee Bucks
- 2011–2012: →Fort Wayne Mad Ants
- 2013: Santa Cruz Warriors
- 2014: Hapoel Migdal Ha'emek
- 2014: Brasília
- 2015–2016: Santa Cruz Warriors
- 2016: Guangxi Rhinos
- 2017–2018: Atenas de Córdoba
- 2018: Rethymno Cretan Kings
- 2018: Metros de Santiago
- 2018–2019: Auxilium Torino
- 2019–2020: Illawarra Hawks
- 2020–2021: Peñarol
- 2021–2022: Khaneh Khuzestan
- 2022: Minas Tênis Clube
- 2023-2024: Botafogo de Futebol e Regatas

Career highlights
- NBA D-League champion (2015); Third-team All-American – AP, SN (2010); MWC Player of the Year (2010); First-team All-MWC (2010)
- Stats at NBA.com
- Stats at Basketball Reference

Darington O'Neal Hobson (born September 29, 1987) is an American former professional basketball player for Botafogo of the Novo Basquete Brasil. He played college basketball for the New Mexico Lobos.

Born in Las Vegas, Nevada, Hobson attended five high schools and a junior college before finally becoming eligible to play Division I college basketball. Hobson was drafted in the 2nd round (37th overall) of the 2010 NBA draft by the Milwaukee Bucks. Hobson was waived on December 2, 2010, due to injury. A year later, Hobson was re-signed by the Bucks for the 2011–12 season. He was waived again on February 3, 2012.

== High school and junior college ==
Hobson attended Western High School in Las Vegas for his freshmen year, before moving to Houston, Texas to attend Alief Hastings High School. At fifteen he attended Gulf Shores Academy, earning his nickname of "Butta" through his pick-up play in Houston. He then moved to southern California and attended his fourth high school of Calvary Baptist Christian. Eventually, he finally moved to Decatur Christian in Illinois for prep school. At Decatur Christian, Hobson was prompted by his coach, Alan Huss, to take the ACT, where he passed. Hobson, rated a 4-star recruit by Scout.com, was coming off a season where he averaged 19 points, 12 rebounds and 7 assists. He still needed credit, and therefore attended the College of Eastern Utah, leading them to a 25–7 record where he averaged 15.2 points and 8.7 rebounds.

== College career ==
=== University of New Mexico ===
Upon coming to UNM, Hobson broke down and cried. "You always wished that you were there and playing on that level," Hobson said. "When I finally got there, I just sat in my room and just thanked God and cried for a couple of hours because I finally got to the place where I always wanted to get."

Virtually unknown coming into the season, the left-handed Hobson was the question mark in how successful UNM's season would be. The Lobos had players in Roman Martinez and Dairese Gary, but the 6'7" point forward JC transfer Hobson was the key to the year where the Lobos were picked fifth in the Mountain West Conference. He did not disappoint, being the first Lobo to ever lead the team in points, rebounds and assists in the regular season. In 2010, Hobson was awarded the Mountain West Conference Men's Basketball Player of the Year and Newcomer of the Year, making him the only player to ever achieve both honors in the same year. He was also named to First-Team All-Mountain West. He was also one of twenty-six finalists for the John R. Wooden Award, which annually awards the most outstanding player in men's college basketball. On March 29, 2010, Hobson was named an Associated Press Third Team All-American, the first since Danny Granger in 2005.

Hobson had 30 points and 10 rebounds against Louisiana Tech on November 21, 2009, going 3 for 4 from behind the arc. He had 22 points and 15 rebounds against the California on December 2, 2009, only to best that with a 29-point, 12-rebound performance against San Diego St. on February 2, including a 56-footer at the first half buzzer. On February 23, Hobson was two points away from being only the second Lobo in UNM history to record a triple-double, with 8 points, 10 rebounds and 11 assists. In the 2010 Mountain West Conference men's basketball tournament, Hobson had 28 points and 15 rebounds en route to a 75–69 Lobos victory over the Air Force Academy.

| Games Played | Minutes/Game | Points/Game | Rebounds/Game | Assists/Game | Field Goal Percentage | 3pt. Field Goal Percentage |
|---|---|---|---|---|---|---|
| 35 | 33.6 | 15.9 | 9.3 | 4.6 | 44.0% | 36.1% |

== Professional career ==
On April 13, 2010, it was reported that Hobson declared himself eligible for the NBA draft while not hiring an agent, leaving the possibility of returning to college basketball a possibility. On May 8, 2010, Hobson declared for the 2010 NBA draft, forfeiting his final year of eligibility at the University of New Mexico.

On June 24, 2010, Hobson was selected with the seventh pick of the second round (37th overall) by the Milwaukee Bucks.

On September 3, 2010, Hobson signed with the Bucks. After not playing during the preseason or during the regular season, he was waived on December 2, 2010, due to injury. He later re-signed with the Bucks for the 2011–12 season, but in February 2012, he was waived again.

On January 1, 2013, Hobson was acquired by the Santa Cruz Warriors of the NBA D-League.

On August 29, 2013, Hobson's rights were acquired by the Delaware 87ers in the 2013 NBA Development League Expansion Draft.

In September 2014, Hobson signed with UniCEUB/BRB of Brazil for the 2014–15 season. He left Brazil in December 2014 after appearing in just six games for UniCEUB. On January 27, 2015, he joined the Santa Cruz Warriors after his rights were traded back to the team from the 87ers on January 21. On April 26, he won the D-League championship with the Warriors.

On November 2, 2015, Hobson was reacquired by Santa Cruz.

On May 25, 2016, Hobson signed with Guangxi Rhinos of the Chinese NBL. Four days later, he made his debut in a 112–95 loss against Hebei Xianglan, recording 30 points, 13 rebounds, four assists and one steal in 34 minutes.

On January 29, 2018, Hobson signed with Panionios of the Greek Basket League.

On March 2, 2018, Hobson signed with Rethymno Cretan Kings B.C. of the Greek Basket League.

On November 28, 2018, Hobson signed a deal with Auxilium Torino of the Italian Lega Basket Serie A

On December 5, 2019, Hobson signed with the Illawarra Hawks of the Australian National Basketball League as an injury replacement for Aaron Brooks. He averaged 5.9 points, 4.2 rebounds and 3.9 assists per game. On October 11, 2020, Hobson signed with Peñarol of the Argentine Liga Nacional de Básquet.

In 2021, he signed with Khaneh Khuzestan of the Iranian league and averaged 18 points and 8.4 rebounds per game. On January 27, 2022, Hobson signed with Minas Tênis Clube of the Novo Basquete Brasil.

== Career statistics ==
Legend
| GP | Games played | GS | Games started | MPG | Minutes per game |
| FG% | Field goal percentage | 3P% | 3-point field goal percentage | FT% | Free throw percentage |
| RPG | Rebounds per game | APG | Assists per game | SPG | Steals per game |
| BPG | Blocks per game | PPG | Points per game | **Bold** | Career high |

=== NBA ===
| Year | Team | GP | GS | MPG | FG% | 3P% | FT% | RPG | APG | SPG | BPG | PPG |
|---|---|---|---|---|---|---|---|---|---|---|---|---|
| 2011–12 | Milwaukee | 5 | 0 | 7.8 | .154 | .000 | – | .6 | 1.2 | .0 | .0 | .8 |
| Career | | 5 | 0 | 7.8 | .154 | .000 | – | .6 | 1.2 | .0 | .0 | .8 |
