= 2010 Mountain West Conference men's basketball tournament =

- Tournament logo
- Classification: Division I
- Season: 2009–10
- Teams: 9
- Site: Thomas & Mack Center; Paradise, NV
- Champions: San Diego State (3rd title)
- Winning coach: Steve Fisher
- MVP: Kawhi Leonard (San Diego State)
- Television: The Mtn., CSTV, Versus

2009–10 Mountain West Conference men's basketball standings
	Conf.				Overall
Team	W		L	PCT	W		L	PCT
No. 8 New Mexico	14	–	2	.875	30	–	5	.857
No. 17 BYU	13	–	3	.813	30	–	6	.833
UNLV	11	–	5	.688	25	–	8	.758
San Diego State†	11	–	5	.688	25	–	9	.735
Colorado State	7	–	9	.438	16	–	16	.500
Utah	7	–	9	.438	14	–	17	.452
TCU	5	–	11	.313	13	–	19	.406
Wyoming	3	–	13	.188	10	–	21	.323
Air Force	1	–	15	.063	10	–	21	.323
† Conference tournament winner As of March 20, 2010; Rankings from AP/Coaches Poll

The 2010 Mountain West Conference men's basketball tournament was played at the Thomas & Mack Center in Las Vegas, Nevada, from March 10–13, 2010. The tournament is sponsored by Conoco. The first-round game and all four quarterfinals were broadcast live on the MountainWest Sports Network. The semifinals was broadcast on CBS College Sports Network, and the championship game on Versus. The winner of the tournament receives an automatic bid to the NCAA tournament.

San Diego State, the fourth seed, defeated University of Nevada, Las Vegas (UNLV), the third seed, to claim the 2010 Mountain West Conference men's basketball tournament championship.

== Tournament bracket ==
First round Wednesday, March 10
8	Wyoming	40
9	Air Force	59

Quarterfinals; Thursday, March 11
1	New Mexico (#8)	75
9	Air Force	69
4	San Diego State	72
5	Colorado State	71
3	UNLV	73
6	Utah	61
2	BYU (#14)	95
7	Texas Christian	85

Semifinals; Friday, March 12
1	New Mexico (#8)	69
4	San Diego State	72
3	UNLV	70
2	BYU (#14)	66

Championship; Saturday, March 13
4	San Diego State	55
3	UNLV	45
