= MountainWest Sports Network =

Former American regional sports network (2006–2012)

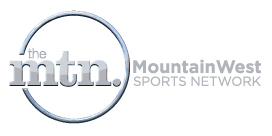
- Country: United States
- Headquarters: Colorado Springs, Colorado

Ownership
- Owner: Mountain West Conference; NBCUniversal Television Group; CBS Corporation

History
- Launched: September 1, 2006; 20 years ago
- Closed: May 31, 2012; 14 years ago

The MountainWest Sports Network, also known as The Mtn. (stylized as the mtn.), was an American college sports television channel. Launched on September 1, 2006, it was dedicated to the Mountain West Conference (MWC), including studio programs following the conference, live events, and documentary-style programs profiling the conference's members.

It was the first such network of its kind in the United States, preceding similar efforts that would emerge from the Big Ten, Pac-12, SEC, and ACC. The network was a joint venture between the conference's two rightsholders, CBS Corporation and NBCUniversal (initially via parent company Comcast).

== History ==
The MountainWest Sports Network launched as part of the conference's new television deals with CSTV and Versus (later known as CBS Sports Network and NBCSN, respectively), which jointly replaced ESPN. It was the first cable sports network in the United States to be devoted to a single college athletic conference—a business model that would later be emulated by Power Five conferences such as the Big Ten, Pac-12, SEC, and ACC.

The channel initially struggled to gain carriage; at launch, it was available to approximately one million subscribers, but it was unable to gain carriage on providers in Las Vegas and San Diego (two of the conference's major markets via the San Diego State Aztecs and the UNLV Rebels) nor on satellite television, at launch.

The lack of national distribution proved particularly frustrating for the BYU Cougars, as the team has a notable national fanbase via the LDS Church. The MountainWest Sports Network had narrower distribution than Brigham Young University's own BYU TV, and the conference's television partners CSTV and Versus. While the agreements limited the number of events BYU TV could air, the MWC did promote that the deals would result in more televised events.

In June 2007, the presidents of BYU and the University of Utah issued a joint press release, stating that the schools had "retained a sports broadcasting attorney to explore all possible options in improving the distribution of athletic broadcasts to their fans." In an interview with KUTV, University of Utah president Michael K. Young stated that "President Samuelson and I have been clear about this for the last year and a half that it is absolutely essential that we get on satellite to make our games available to our fans. Anything short of that is unacceptable." He then added that "We are passionately committed to our having our football games being on TV this year."

The MountainWest Sports Network reached a carriage agreement with DirecTV in 2008.

=== Closure ===
In 2010, as part of a larger re-alignment of the Mountain West, Utah moved to the Pac-10. In mid-August 2010, after Fresno State and Nevada were invited to the MWC, it was reported that CBS and Comcast wanted to expand distribution of MountainWest Sports Network. It was also reported that BYU was contemplating becoming a football independent and joining the West Coast Conference (WCC) in all other sports, with dissatisfaction with the MountainWest Sports Network being a factor. BYU athletic director Tom Holmoe stated that "We have a national base. We can go all over the country and people can see that. That is a very important thing to us right now—exposure." BYU announced its exit from the MWC as expected on August 31, 2010, and reached an agreement with ESPN to carry its games. In 2011 Comcast-owned Xfinity began expanding its carriage of the channel, especially in non-Mountain West markets, after Boise State joined the conference.

On April 5, 2012, amid further uncertainty surrounding the conference (including the possibility of an alliance or merger with Conference USA), it was announced that the MountainWest Sports Network would shut down on May 31, 2012. Its employees were offered severance pay, and positions at the Comcast SportsNet regional networks. The MWC had not announced formal broadcast plans for 2012–13, though a Colorado Springs Gazette report suggested that some MWC games might be picked up by CBS Sports Network or NBCSN, or offered to a third party such as ESPN. The conference ultimately renewed with CBS Sports Network, and reached seven-year agreements with ESPN and regional network Root Sports Rocky Mountain beginning in the 2013–14 season.

The "Mountain West Network" name remains in use for a digital platform carrying conference events not broadcast on television, which relies upon on-campus productions.

== Programming ==
=== Live events ===
The network covered over 800 live sporting events in its first four years of operation. Details of football and basketball telecasts are listed in the events section below. Also on the schedule are current and former Olympic sports like baseball, softball, soccer, volleyball, and track and field. The Mtn. aired pregame and post game shows from its suburban Denver, Colorado studios in support of most of the network's live event coverage, including football, men's and women's basketball, baseball, soccer, volleyball and softball. Halftime shows took place for all football and men's and women's basketball game telecasts.

=== Studio shows ===
- All-22 — Each week, the MWC football coaches traded game video via web-based technology called DragonFly. The Mtn. had received access to this content, which provided a bird's-eye view of the field of play, enabling the studio analysts to dissect team strategies, performances and keys to success.
- Around the Mountain — Brought together some of the best sportswriters and bloggers from across the Mountain West region for an entertaining discussion and debate about the latest developments and trends across the Conference and beyond.
- It's a Numbers Game — Fantasy football players and stats enthusiasts alike will enjoy It's a Numbers Game as host Scott Sarra takes viewers past the highlights and deep into the trends and box scores.
- Mountain Sports Report — Mountain Sports Report, presented by Dodge debuted Saturday, September 4, 2010. This 30-minute news program airs live Tuesday through Friday at 5:30 p.m. MT and on Saturdays at 10 p.m. MT or after the final game scheduled that evening. The program replays several times each evening, schedule permitting. Mountain Sports Report, presented by Dodge features scores and highlights plus provides previews and feature stories from across the Mountain West Conference. Network anchors Marius Payton and Bill Doleman along with Natalie Vickers host the program.
- Mountain West Football Saturday — Airs at 11 a.m. MT every Saturday throughout the football season beginning in August with one full hour of features, stories and previews of the upcoming games of the day. Expert analysis along with in-depth reporting and compelling storylines break down the key match-ups and prepare viewers for all the upcoming action. Marius Payton and Bill Doleman host, with expert analysis provided on a rotating basis by Joe Glenn, Jay Leeuwenburg, Kelly Stouffer and Ted Sundquist.
- Season and championship preview and reviews shows for all Mountain West Conference sanctioned sports air throughout the year.

=== Former shows ===
The Mountain View (final show 9/3/10), The Mountain Cap, Mountain Peak Performances (final show September 1, 2010) and On Campus Cam have been canceled. On Campus Cam, which featured a panel of students from different institutions across the Mountain West Conference, was rolled into Around the Mountain, presented by Jeep roughly once per month.

=== Documentaries/reality shows ===
- A Day in the Life – Gave viewers the opportunity to look into the daily lives of student-athletes and other personalities from Conference institutions.
- A Conversation with... – Combines interviews with participatory journalism with one-on-one interviews with prominent individuals from across the Mountain West Conference.
- Legends – Profiles of former MWC players and coaches. Debuted August 27, the day of its DirecTV debut, with Lavell Edwards. Other "Legends" have included Jerry Tarkanian, Amy Van Dyken and Chad Hennings.
- Rivalries – Looks at each Mountain West Conference institution's biggest rival from an athletic and casual fan's point of view across multiple sports.
- Season Pass – The Mtn. presents an insider's look into the Colorado State men's basketball team and the UNLV women's basketball squad in 2011 with these two new original programs: Season Pass: Colorado State Men's Basketball and Season Pass: UNLV Women's Basketball. Both shows are a continuation under a more appropriate title of The Mtn.'s successful original program, Reaching the Peak, which in past seasons has featured the TCU baseball team, Colorado State men's basketball and football teams, and the Wyoming football team. Each show provides viewers an in-depth, behind-the-scenes look into athletic programs across the Mountain West Conference that delves into the lives of the student-athletes. Season Pass will follow both programs from the first days of practice through the 2011 Conoco Mountain West Conference basketball championships. Unique elements from the prior seasons will return in Season Pass: Colorado State Men's Basketball, including Miles a Minute, Player Profiles ("The Roster") and The Rams' Glossary. Player Profiles and the Lady Rebels Glossary will apply to Season Pass: UNLV Women's Basketball. Both shows will incorporate a player version of Coach 'em Up called This Is My Game, which features different players demonstrating a how-to on various on-court techniques. Additional web-only segments will be available throughout the season exclusively at themtn.tv.

== Notable on-air staff ==
- Anne Marie Anderson
- Gary Bender
- Todd Christensen
- Joe Cravens
- Blaine Fowler
- Akbar Gbaja-Biamila
- Courtney George
- Joe Glenn
- Robert Griffith
- Mark Knudson
- Andrea Lloyd
- Tim Neverett
- Glenn Parker
- Reggie Rivers
- Ari Wolfe
