= 2018–19 Creighton Bluejays men's basketball team =

American college basketball season

2018–19 Creighton Bluejays men's basketball

Cayman Islands Classic Champions

NIT, Quarterfinals
- Conference: Big East Conference
- Record: 20–15 (9–9 Big East)
- Head coach: Greg McDermott (9th season)
- Assistant coaches: Preston Murphy (4th season); Alan Huss (2nd season); Paul Lusk (1st season)
- Home arena: CHI Health Center Omaha

2018–19 Big East men's basketball standings
	Conf.				Overall
Team	W		L	PCT	W		L	PCT
No. 23 Villanova †	13	–	5	.722	26	–	10	.722
Marquette	12	–	6	.667	24	–	10	.706
Seton Hall	9	–	9	.500	20	–	14	.588
Xavier	9	–	9	.500	19	–	16	.543
Creighton	9	–	9	.500	20	–	15	.571
Georgetown	9	–	9	.500	19	–	14	.576
St. John's	8	–	10	.444	21	–	13	.618
Providence	7	–	11	.389	18	–	16	.529
Butler	7	–	11	.389	16	–	17	.485
DePaul	7	–	11	.389	19	–	17	.528
† 2019 Big East tournament winner Rankings from AP Poll

The 2018–19 Creighton Bluejays men's basketball team represented Creighton University in the 2018–19 NCAA Division I men's basketball season. The Bluejays were led by ninth-year head coach Greg McDermott and played their home games at the newly-named CHI Health Center Omaha, as members of the Big East Conference. They finished the season 20–15, 9–9 in Big East play to finish in a four-way tie for third place. As the No. 5 seed in the Big East tournament, they lost to Xavier in the quarterfinals. They received a bid to the National Invitation Tournament as the No. 2 seed in the TCU bracket where they defeated Loyola and Memphis before losing to TCU in the quarterfinals.

== Previous season ==
The Bluejays finished the 2017–18 season 21–12, 10–8 in Big East play to finish in a three-way tie for third place. They lost in the quarterfinals of the Big East tournament to Providence. They received an at-large bid to the NCAA tournament as the No. 8 seed in the South Region. There the Bluejays lost in the first round to Kansas State.

== Offseason ==
=== Departures ===
Name	Number	Pos.	Height	Weight	Year	Hometown	Notes
Marcus Foster	0	G	6'3"	215	Senior (redshirt)	Wichita Falls, TX	Graduated
Khyri Thomas	2	G	6'3"	210	Junior	Omaha, NE	Declared for the 2018 NBA draft; selected 38th overall by the Philadelphia 76ers.
Ronnie Harrell	5	G	6'7"	195	Junior (redshirt)	Denver, CO	Graduate transferred to Denver
Tyler Clement	11	G	6'2"	185	Senior	Overland Park, KS	Graduated
Toby Hegner	32	F	6'10"	235	Senior (redshirt)	Berlin, WI	Graduated
Manny Suarez	44	C	6'10"	250	Senior (redshirt)	Cliffside Park, NJ	Graduated

In addition to the departing players, top assistant Darian DeVries left to take the head coaching vacancy at Drake. He had been with Creighton since 1998, first as an equipment manager and then from 2001 as an assistant coach.

=== Incoming transfers ===
Name	Number	Pos.	Height	Weight	Year	Hometown	Notes
Connor Cashaw	2	G	6'5"	205	Graduate Student	Lincolnshire, IL	Transferred from Rice. Will be eligible to play immediately since Cashaw graduated from Rice.
Denzel Mahoney	34	G	6'4"	213	Junior	Oviedo, FL	Transferred from Southeast Missouri State. Under NCAA transfer rules, Mahoney will have to sit out for the 2018–19 season. Will have two years of remaining eligibility.

=== 2018 recruiting class ===
College recruiting information
Name	Hometown	School	Height	Weight	Commit date
Marcus Zegarowski; PG	Hamilton, MA	Tilton School	6 ft 1 in (1.85 m)	164 lb (74 kg)	Sep 4, 2017
Marcus Zegarowski; PG	Recruit ratings: Scout: Rivals: 247Sports: ESPN:				
Christian Bishop; SF	Lee's Summit, MO	Lee's Summit West High School	6 ft 7 in (2.01 m)	180 lb (82 kg)	Jun 22, 2017
Christian Bishop; SF	Recruit ratings: Scout: Rivals: 247Sports: ESPN:				
Sam Froling; PF	Canberra, ACT	Australian Institute of Sport	6 ft 9 in (2.06 m)	205 lb (93 kg)	Jan 15, 2018
Sam Froling; PF	Recruit ratings: Scout: Rivals: 247Sports: ESPN:				
Overall recruit ranking:
Note: In many cases, Scout, Rivals, 247Sports, On3, and ESPN may conflict in their listings of height and weight.; In these cases, the average was taken. ESPN grades are on a 100-point scale.; Sources: "2018 Team Ranking". Rivals.

=== 2019 recruiting class ===
College recruiting information (2019)
Name	Hometown	School	Height	Weight	Commit date
Shereef Mitchell; PG	Omaha, NE	Burke High School	6 ft 0 in (1.83 m)	155 lb (70 kg)	Jul 12, 2018
Shereef Mitchell; PG	Recruit ratings: Scout: Rivals: 247Sports: ESPN:				
Overall recruit ranking:
Note: In many cases, Scout, Rivals, 247Sports, On3, and ESPN may conflict in their listings of height and weight.; In these cases, the average was taken. ESPN grades are on a 100-point scale.; Sources: "2019 Team Ranking". Rivals.

== Roster ==
2018–19 Creighton Bluejays men's basketball team
Players
Coaches

Pos.	#	Name	Height	Weight	Year	Previous school	Hometown
G	1	Davion Mintz	6 ft 3 in (1.91 m)	185 lb (84 kg)	Jr	North Mecklenburg HS	Charlotte, NC
G	2	Connor Cashaw	6 ft 5 in (1.96 m)	200 lb (91 kg)	GS	Stevenson HS; Rice	Lincolnshire, IL
G	5	Ty-Shon Alexander	6 ft 4 in (1.93 m)	195 lb (88 kg)	So	Oak Hill Academy (VA)	Charlotte, NC
G	10	Jett Canfield (W)	5 ft 10 in (1.78 m)	155 lb (70 kg)	Fr	Hayden HS	Topeka, KS
G	11	Marcus Zegarowski	6 ft 2 in (1.88 m)	180 lb (82 kg)	Fr	Tilton School	Hamilton, MA
G	12	Jordan Scurry (W)	6 ft 2 in (1.88 m)	200 lb (91 kg)	Jr	St. Mark's	Chestnut Hill, MA
F	13	Christian Bishop	6 ft 7 in (2.01 m)	205 lb (93 kg)	Fr	West	Lee's Summit, MO
G	14	Kaleb Joseph	6 ft 3 in (1.91 m)	185 lb (84 kg)	RS Sr	Cushing Academy; Syracuse	Nashua, NH
F	15	Martin Krampelj	6 ft 9 in (2.06 m)	235 lb (107 kg)	RS Jr	Impact Academy	Grosuplje, Slovenia
G/F	23	Damien Jefferson	6 ft 5 in (1.96 m)	200 lb (91 kg)	RS So	Central HS; New Mexico	East Chicago, IN
G	24	Mitch Ballock	6 ft 5 in (1.96 m)	205 lb (93 kg)	So	Eudora HS	Eudora, KS
C	31	Sam Froling	7 ft 0 in (2.13 m)	230 lb (104 kg)	Fr	Australian Institute of Sport	Townsville, Australia
G	34	Denzel Mahoney (redshirt)	6 ft 5 in (1.96 m)	225 lb (102 kg)	Jr	Hagerty; Southeast Missouri State	Oviedo, FL
C	41	Jacob Epperson	6 ft 11 in (2.11 m)	225 lb (102 kg)	Fr	La Lumiere (IN)	Melbourne, Australia

Head coach

- Greg McDermott (Northern Iowa)

Assistant coach(es)

- Preston Murphy (Rhode Island)
- Alan Huss (Creighton)
- Paul Lusk (Southern Illinois)

Legend

- (C) Team captain
- (S) Suspended
- (I) Ineligible
- (W) Walk-on
- Injured
- Current redshirt

Roster

== Schedule and results ==
Date time, TV	Rank^{#}	Opponent^{#}	Result	Record	High points	High rebounds	High assists	Site (attendance) city, state
Exhibition
October 27, 2018*; 7:00 pm		Winona State	W 101–57	–	17 – Alexander	7 – Epperson	4 – Tied	CHI Health Center Omaha (15,804); Omaha, NE
Non-conference regular season
November 6, 2018*; 7:30 pm, FSN		Western Illinois	W 78–67	1–0	13 – Tied	12 – Jefferson	5 – Ballock	CHI Health Center Omaha (16,449); Omaha, NE
November 11, 2018*; 12:30 pm, FS1		East Tennessee State; Cayman Islands Classic on-campus site	W 75–69	2–0	20 – Alexander	3 – Froling	3 – Tied	CHI Health Center Omaha (16,506); Omaha, NE
November 15, 2018*; 6:00 pm, FS1		Ohio State; Gavitt Tipoff Games	L 60–69	2–1	16 – Alexander	7 – Krampelj	3 – Tied	CHI Health Center Omaha (17,146); Omaha, NE
November 19, 2018*; 6:30 pm, Stadium		vs. Boise State; Cayman Islands Classic quarterfinals	W 94–82	3–1	18 – Alexander	6 – Tied	4 – Tied	John Gray High School (1,512); George Town, Cayman Islands
November 20, 2018*; 6:30 pm, Stadium		vs. Georgia State; Cayman Islands Classic semifinals	W 93–68	4–1	23 – Ballock	7 – Ballock	6 – Ballock	John Gray High School (1,558); George Town, Cayman Islands
November 21, 2018*; 6:30pm, Stadium		vs. No. 16 Clemson; Cayman Islands Classic championship	W 87–82	5–1	36 – Alexander	5 – Zegarowski	3 – Tied	John Gray High School (1,709); George Town, Cayman Islands
November 28, 2018*; 7:30 pm, FS1		Montana	W 98–72	6–1	18 – Jefferson	6 – Krampelj	6 – Zegarowski	CHI Health Center Omaha (16,457); Omaha, NE
December 1, 2018*; 1:00 pm, FOX		No. 1 Gonzaga	L 92–103	6–2	27 – Alexander	9 – Jefferson	5 – Alexander	CHI Health Center Omaha (18,759); Omaha, NE
December 8, 2018*; 5:00 pm, BTN		at No. 24 Nebraska; Rivalry	L 75–94	6–3	23 – Ballock	5 – Tied	3 – Alexander	Pinnacle Bank Arena (15,950); Lincoln, NE
December 14, 2018*; 8:00 pm, FS1		Green Bay	W 86–65	7–3	19 – Ballock	9 – Jefferson	6 – Alexander	CHI Health Center Omaha (17,147); Omaha, NE
December 18, 2018*; 8:00 pm, ESPNU		at Oklahoma	W 83–70	7–4	19 – Krampelj	10 – Krampelj	2 – Tied	Lloyd Noble Center (4.480); Norman, OK
December 20, 2018*; 7:00 pm, FS1		Coe	W 110–60	8–4	20 – Zegarowski	7 – Cashaw	7 – Tied	CHI Health Center Omaha (16,328); Omaha, NE
December 27, 2018*; 7:00 pm, FS1		UMKC	W 89–53	9–4	19 – Alexander	8 – Krampelj	6 – Mintz	CHI Health Center Omaha (17,608); Omaha, NE
Big East regular season
December 31, 2018; 3:00 pm, FS1		at Providence	W 79–68	10–4 (1–0)	18 – Alexander	9 – Krampelj	6 – Ballock	Dunkin' Donuts Center (11,343); Providence, RI
January 5, 2019; 11:00 am, FS1		at Butler	L 69–84	10–5 (1–1)	16 – Krampelj	8 – Krampelj	5 – Zegarowski	Hinkle Fieldhouse (9,148); Indianapolis, IN
January 9, 2019; 6:00 pm, CBSSN		No. 21 Marquette	L 104–106 ^{OT}	10–6 (1–2)	23 – Alexander	8 – Krampelj	4 – Ballock	CHI Health Center Omaha (17,085); Omaha, NE
January 13, 2019; 11:00 am, FOX		Villanova	L 78–90	10–7 (1–3)	22 – Alexander	10 – Krampelj	7 – Zegarowski	CHI Health Center Omaha (17,379); Omaha, NE
January 16, 2019; 5:30 pm, FS1		at St. John's	L 66–81	10–8 (1–4)	17 – Zegarowsi	9 – Krampelj	4 – Tied	Carnesecca Arena (5,602); Queens, NY
January 21, 2019; 7:45 pm, FS1		at Georgetown	W 91–87	11–8 (2–4)	26 – Alexander	8 – Krampelj	4 – Tie	Capital One Arena (5,230); Washington, D.C.
January 25, 2019; 7:00 pm, FS1		Butler	W 75–61	12–8 (3–4)	19 – Alexander	8 – Krampelj	6 – Mintz	CHI Health Center Omaha (18,089); Omaha, NE
January 30, 2019; 7:30 pm, FS1		St. John's	L 67–83	12–9 (3–5)	15 – Alexander	5 – Bzllock	7 – Mintz	CHI Health Center Omaha (16,832); Omaha, NE
February 3, 2019; 12:00 pm, FSN		Xavier	W 76–54	13–9 (4–5)	23 – Krampelj	6 – Krampelj	3 – Tied	CHI Health Center Omaha (16,678); Omaha, NE
February 6, 2019; 7:00 pm, CBSSN		at No. 14 Villanova	L 59–66	13–10 (4–6)	19 – Mintz	10 – Krampelj	4 – Mintz	Finneran Pavilion (6,501); Villanova, PA
February 9, 2019; 7:00 pm, CBSSN		at Seton Hall	L 58–63	13–11 (4–7)	25 – Krampelj	11 – Krampelj	5 – Mintz	Prudential Center (9,681); Newark, NJ
February 13, 2019; 7:30 pm, CBSSN		at Xavier	L 61–64	13–12 (4–8)	18 – Krampelj	10 – Alexander	5 – Alexander	Cintas Center (9,949); Cincinnati, OH
February 17, 2019; 2:00 pm, FS1		Seton Hall	L 75–81	13–13 (4–9)	20 – Alexander	8 – Ballock	5 – Mintz	CHI Health Center Omaha (17,036); Omaha, NE
February 20, 2019; 8:00 pm, FSN		at DePaul	W 79–67	14–13 (5–9)	16 – Alexander	7 – Krampelj	6 – Alexander	Wintrust Arena (4,238); Chicago, IL
February 23, 2019; 1:40 pm, FOX		Georgetown	W 82–69	15–13 (6–9)	22 – Krampelj	9 – Krampelj	6 – Ballock	CHI Health Center Omaha (17,358); Omaha, NE
March 3, 2019; 2:00 pm, FS1		at No. 10 Marquette	W 66–60	16–13 (7–9)	19 – Krampelj	7 – Alexander	5 – Zegarowski	Fiserv Forum (17,512); Milwaukee, WI
March 6, 2019; 7:00 pm, CBSSN		Providence	W 76–70 ^{OT}	17–13 (8–9)	17 – Alexander	10 – Krampelj	3 – Krampelj	CHI Health Center Omaha (16,903); Omaha, NE
March 9, 2019; 7:00 pm, FS1		DePaul	W 91–78	18–13 (9–9)	39 – Ballock	10 – Krampelj	10 – Zegarowski	CHI Health Center Omaha (17,083); Omaha, NE
Big East Tournament
March 14, 2019; 1:30 pm, FS1	(5)	vs. (4) Xavier; Quarterfinals	L 61–63	18–14	21 – Alexander	9 – Krampelj	3 – Tie	Madison Square Garden (19,534); New York, NY
NIT
March 19, 2019*; 8:00 pm, ESPNU	(2)	(7) Loyola–Chicago; First Round – TCU Bracket	W 70–61	19–14	17 – Krampelj	8 – Krampelj	7 – Alexander	CHI Health Center Omaha (5,755); Omaha, NE
March 22, 2019*; 7:30 pm, ESPNU	(2)	(3) Memphis; Second Round – TCU Bracket	W 79–67	20–14	14 – Ballock/Zegarowski	10 – Bishop	8 – Zegarowski	CHI Health Center Omaha (7,031); Omaha, NE
March 26, 2019*; 8:00 pm, ESPN	(2)	at (1) TCU; Quarterfinals – TCU Bracket	L 58–71	20–15	14 – Ballock	6 – Bishop	2 – Tied	Schollmaier Arena (3,314); Fort Worth, Texas
*Non-conference game. ^{#}Rankings from AP Poll. (#) Tournament seedings in parentheses. All times are in Central Time.
