= 2018–19 Nevada Wolf Pack men's basketball team =

American college basketball season

2018–19 Nevada Wolf Pack men's basketball

Mountain West regular season co-champions Las Vegas Holiday Invitational champions

NCAA tournament, First Round
- Conference: Mountain West Conference

Ranking
- Coaches: No. 23
- AP: No. 20
- Record: 29–5 (15–3 MW)
- Head coach: Eric Musselman (4th season)
- Assistant coaches: Anthony Ruta; Gus Argenal; Brandon Dunson
- Home arena: Lawlor Events Center

2018–19 Mountain West Conference men's basketball standings
	Conf.				Overall
Team	W		L	PCT	W		L	PCT
No. 20 Nevada	15	–	3	.833	29	–	5	.853
No. 25 Utah State †	15	–	3	.833	28	–	7	.800
Fresno State	13	–	5	.722	23	–	9	.719
San Diego State	11	–	7	.611	21	–	13	.618
UNLV	11	–	7	.611	17	–	14	.548
Air Force	8	–	10	.444	14	–	18	.438
New Mexico	7	–	11	.389	14	–	18	.438
Boise State	7	–	11	.389	13	–	20	.394
Colorado State	7	–	11	.389	12	–	20	.375
Wyoming	4	–	14	.222	8	–	24	.250
San Jose State	1	–	17	.056	4	–	27	.129
† Mountain West Conference tournament winner Rankings from AP Poll

The 2018–19 Nevada Wolf Pack men's basketball team represented the University of Nevada, Reno during the 2018–19 NCAA Division I men's basketball season. The Wolf Pack, led by fourth-year head coach Eric Musselman, played their home games at the Lawlor Events Center on their campus in Reno, Nevada as members of the Mountain West Conference (MW). They finished the season 29–5, 15–3 in Mountain West play to share the regular season Mountain West championship with Utah State. They defeated Boise State in the quarterfinals of the Mountain West tournament before losing in the semifinals to San Diego State. They received an at-large bid to the NCAA tournament where they lost in the first round to Florida.

On April 7, head coach Eric Musselman resigned to become the head coach at Arkansas. He finished at Nevada with a four-year record of 110–34, three trips to the NCAA Tournament, and were champions of the 2016 College Basketball Invitational.

On April 11, Nevada hired Steve Alford as their next head coach.

== Previous season ==
The Wolf Pack finished the season 29–8 overall and 15–3 in conference play to win the MW regular season championship. They defeated UNLV in the quarterfinals of the MW tournament before losing in the semifinals to San Diego State. They received an at-large bid to the NCAA tournament where they defeated Texas and Cincinnati to advance to the Sweet Sixteen where they lost to Loyola–Chicago.

== Offseason ==
=== Departures ===
Name	Number	Pos.	Height	Weight	Year	Hometown	Reason for departure
Hallice Cooke	13	G	6'3"	190	Senior (redshirt)	Union City, NJ	Graduated
Elijah Foster	12	F	6'7"	240	Senior	Seattle, WA	Graduated
Josh Hall	33	G/F	6'6"	190	Sophomore	Detroit, MI	Transferred to Missouri State
John Jones	3	G	6'0"	165	Freshman	Baton Rouge, LA	Left program after his father was named the new head coach at Texas Southern.
Kendall Stephens	21	G	6'7"	205	Senior (redshirt)	St. Charles, IL	Graduated
Charlie Tooley	1	G	6'0"	190	Sophomore	Granite Bay, CA	Transferred to Cal State Monterey Bay
Darien Williams	4	C	6'8"	235	Senior	San Francisco, CA	Graduated

=== Incoming transfers ===
Name	Number	Pos.	Height	Weight	Year	Hometown	Previous school
Jalen Harris	1	G	6'4"	195	Junior	Dallas, TX	Transferred from Louisiana Tech. Will sit out the 2018–19 season due to NCAA transfer rules and will then have two seasons of eligibility.
Trey Porter	15	F	6'11"	230	GS	Woodbridge, VA	Graduate transferred from Old Dominion. Immediately eligible for the 2018–19 season only.
Josiah Wood	4	G	6'5"	200	Senior	Reno, NV	Transferred from Alaska–Anchorage. Will sit out the 2018–19 season due to NCAA transfer rules and will then have one season of eligibility.

=== 2018 recruiting class ===
College recruiting information
Name	Hometown	School	Height	Weight	Commit date
Jordan Brown #5 C	Roseville, CA	Prolific Prep	6 ft 10 in (2.08 m)	205 lb (93 kg)	May 11, 2018
Jordan Brown #5 C	Recruit ratings: Scout: Rivals: ESPN: (89)				
K.J. Hymes; PF	Phoenix, AZ	Saint Mary's High School	6 ft 8 in (2.03 m)	193 lb (88 kg)	Sep 13, 2017
K.J. Hymes; PF	Recruit ratings: Scout: Rivals: ESPN: (78)				
Vincent Lee; PF	Midlothian, TX	Midlothian High School	6 ft 7 in (2.01 m)	195 lb (88 kg)	Oct 22, 2017
Vincent Lee; PF	Recruit ratings: Scout: Rivals: (N/A)				
Overall recruit ranking: Scout: – Rivals: –
Note: In many cases, Scout, Rivals, 247Sports, On3, and ESPN may conflict in their listings of height and weight.; In these cases, the average was taken. ESPN grades are on a 100-point scale.; Sources: "2018 Team Ranking". Rivals.

=== 2019 recruiting class ===
College recruiting information (2019)
Name	Hometown	School	Height	Weight	Commit date
Dischon Thomas; PF	Phoenix, AZ	Hillcrest Hoops	6 ft 9 in (2.06 m)	190 lb (86 kg)	Nov 14, 2017
Dischon Thomas; PF	Recruit ratings: Scout: Rivals: (N/A)				
Overall recruit ranking: Scout: – Rivals: –
Note: In many cases, Scout, Rivals, 247Sports, On3, and ESPN may conflict in their listings of height and weight.; In these cases, the average was taken. ESPN grades are on a 100-point scale.; Sources: "2019 Team Ranking". Rivals.

== Preseason ==
According to ESPN journalist Jeff Borzello, this season's Wolf Pack team "has high-level talent throughout its roster", later adding, "There might not be a team in the country with more college-proven depth than Nevada." The team returns three players who earned all-conference recognition last season—first-team members Jordan Caroline and Caleb Martin and second-team member Cody Martin, with Caleb Martin also having been named Player of the Year by MW coaches. Additionally, six transfers who averaged at least 13 points per game in their immediately previous seasons of college play will become eligible this season.

At the conference's media days in Las Vegas, Caroline and the Martin twins were named as preseason first-team all-conference picks for 2018–19, with Caleb Martin picked as the preseason Player of the Year. Jordan Brown, who headed the Pack's 2018 recruiting class, was named preseason Freshman of the Year. The Pack were also the overwhelming choice for the MW regular-season title, receiving all but one of the possible first-place votes.

== Roster ==
2018–19 Nevada Wolf Pack men's basketball team
Players
Coaches

Pos.	#	Name	Height	Weight	Year	Previous school	Hometown
F	0	Tre'Shawn Thurman	6 ft 7 in (2.01 m)	230 lb (104 kg)	RS Sr	Omaha Central HS; Omaha	Omaha, NE
G	1	Jalen Harris (I) (redshirt)	6 ft 4 in (1.93 m)	195 lb (88 kg)	Jr	Duncanville HS; Louisiana Tech	Dallas, TX
G	2	Corey Henson	6 ft 3 in (1.91 m)	175 lb (79 kg)	RS Sr	DeMatha Catholic HS; Wagner	Upper Marlboro, MD
G	4	Josiah Wood (I, W) (redshirt)	6 ft 5 in (1.96 m)	200 lb (91 kg)	Sr	Galena HS; Alaska–Anchorage	Reno, NV
G	5	Nisre Zouzoua	6 ft 2 in (1.88 m)	200 lb (91 kg)	RS Jr	Boston Trinity Academy; Bryant	Brockton, MA
F	10	Caleb Martin	6 ft 7 in (2.01 m)	205 lb (93 kg)	RS Sr	Oak Hill Academy; NC State	Mocksville, NC
G/F	11	Cody Martin	6 ft 7 in (2.01 m)	205 lb (93 kg)	RS Sr	Oak Hill Academy; NC State	Mocksville, NC
G	12	Isaiah Rhymes (W)	6 ft 3 in (1.91 m)	190 lb (86 kg)	Fr	Carl Hayden HS	Phoenix, AZ
G	14	Lindsey Drew	6 ft 4 in (1.93 m)	180 lb (82 kg)	Sr	Fairfax HS	Encino, CA
F	15	Trey Porter	6 ft 11 in (2.11 m)	230 lb (104 kg)	GS	Potomac HS; George Mason; Old Dominion	Woodbridge, VA
G	20	David Cunningham (W)	6 ft 4 in (1.93 m)	195 lb (88 kg)	Sr	Bella Vista HS	Sacramento, CA
F	21	Jordan Brown	6 ft 11 in (2.11 m)	210 lb (95 kg)	Fr	Prolific Prep	Roseville, CA
G	22	Jazz Johnson	5 ft 10 in (1.78 m)	195 lb (88 kg)	RS Jr	Lake Oswego HS; Portland	Lake Oswego, OR
G/F	23	Jalen Townsell (W)	6 ft 7 in (2.01 m)	198 lb (90 kg)	Fr	Spanish Springs HS	Sparks, NV
F	24	Jordan Caroline	6 ft 7 in (2.01 m)	230 lb (104 kg)	RS Sr	Montverde Academy; Southern Illinois	Champaign, IL
F	40	Vincent Lee	6 ft 9 in (2.06 m)	215 lb (98 kg)	Fr	Midlothian HS	Midlothian, TX
F	45	K .J. Hymes (redshirt)	6 ft 11 in (2.11 m)	210 lb (95 kg)	Fr	Hillcrest Prep	Phoenix, AZ
G/F	54	Zach Wurm (W)	6 ft 4 in (1.93 m)	216 lb (98 kg)	Sr	Bishop Manogue HS; Menlo College	Reno, NV

Head coach

- Eric Musselman (San Diego)

Assistant coach(es)

- Anthony Ruta (Arizona State)
- Gus Argenal (UC Davis)
- Brandon Dunson (Arizona State)

Legend

- (C) Team captain
- (S) Suspended
- (I) Ineligible
- (W) Walk-on
- Injured
- Current redshirt

Roster
Last update: July 29, 2018

== Schedule and results ==
Date time, TV	Rank^{#}	Opponent^{#}	Result	Record	Site city, state
Exhibition
October 21, 2018*; 3:00 pm		Washington; Wildfire Charity	L 73–91		Lawlor Events Center (4,069); Reno, NV
October 26, 2018*; 7:00 pm	No. 7	San Francisco State	W 85–60		Virginia Street Gym (1,588); Reno, NV
Non-conference regular season
November 6, 2018*; 8:00 pm, CBSSN	No. 7	BYU	W 86–70	1–0	Lawlor Events Center (11,094); Reno, NV
November 9, 2018*; 7:00 pm, ESPN3	No. 7	Pacific	W 83–61	2–0	Lawlor Events Center (10,561); Reno, NV
November 16, 2018*; 8:00 pm, ESPNU	No. 6	Little Rock; Las Vegas Holiday Invitational	W 87–59	3–0	Lawlor Events Center (10,273); Reno, NV
November 19, 2018*; 7:00 pm, Stadium	No. 6	California Baptist; Las Vegas Holiday Invitational	W 90–55	4–0	Lawlor Events Center (9,395); Reno, NV
November 22, 2018*; 1:00 pm, FS1	No. 6	vs. Tulsa; Las Vegas Holiday Invitational semifinals	W 96–86	5–0	Orleans Arena; Paradise, NV
November 23, 2018*; 7:00 pm, FS1	No. 6	vs. UMass; Las Vegas Holiday Invitational final	W 110–87	6–0	Orleans Arena; Paradise, NV
November 27, 2018*; 5:00 pm, ESPNews	No. 5	at Loyola–Chicago; MW–MVC Challenge	W 79–65	7–0	Joseph J. Gentile Arena (4,963); Chicago, IL
December 1, 2018*; 1:30 pm, FOX	No. 5	at USC	W 73–61	8–0	Galen Center (5,844); Los Angeles, CA
December 7, 2018*; 9:00 pm, ESPN2	No. 6	vs. No. 20 Arizona State; Basketball Hall of Fame Classic	W 72–66	9–0	Staples Center (7,235); Los Angeles, CA
December 9, 2018*; 2:30 pm, ESPNU	No. 6	vs. Grand Canyon; Jerry Colangelo Classic	W 74–66	10–0	Talking Stick Resort Arena (10,172); Phoenix, AZ
December 15, 2018*; 6:00 pm, ESPN3	No. 7	South Dakota State	W 72–68	11–0	Lawlor Events Center (11,257); Reno, NV
December 22, 2018*; 4:00 pm, ESPN3	No. 6	Akron	W 68–62	12–0	Lawlor Events Center (10,825); Reno, NV
December 29, 2018*; 11:00 am, P12N	No. 6	at Utah	W 86–71	13–0	Jon M. Huntsman Center (12,835); Salt Lake City, UT
Mountain West regular season
January 2, 2019; 8:00 pm, ESPNU	No. 6	Utah State	W 72–49	14–0 (1–0)	Lawlor Events Center (11,224); Reno, NV
January 5, 2019; 5:00 pm, ESPNU	No. 6	at New Mexico	L 58–85	14–1 (1–1)	Dreamstyle Arena (12,702); Albuquerque, NM
January 9, 2019; 8:00 pm, CBSSN	No. 10	San Jose State	W 92–53	15–1 (2–1)	Lawlor Events Center (10,432); Reno, NV
January 12, 2019; 5:00 pm, ESPNU	No. 10	at Fresno State	W 74–64	16–1 (3–1)	Save Mart Center (9,586); Fresno, CA
January 15, 2019; 6:00 pm, CBSSN	No. 10	at Boise State	W 72–71	17–1 (4–1)	Taco Bell Arena (8,022); Boise, ID
January 19, 2019; 7:00 pm, ESPNU	No. 10	Air Force	W 67–52	18–1 (5–1)	Lawlor Events Center (11,222); Reno, NV
January 23, 2019; 8:00 pm, CBSSN	No. 7	Colorado State	W 100–60	19–1 (6–1)	Lawlor Events Center (10,931); Reno, NV
January 29, 2019; 8:00 pm, ESPN2	No. 8	at UNLV	W 87–70	20–1 (7–1)	Thomas & Mack Center (15,786); Paradise, NV
February 2, 2019; 3:00 pm, CBSSN	No. 8	Boise State	W 93–73	21–1 (8–1)	Lawlor Events Center (11,207); Reno, NV
February 6, 2019; 7:00 pm, CBSSN	No. 6	at Colorado State	W 98–82	22–1 (9–1)	Moby Arena (3,765); Fort Collins, CO
February 9, 2019; 3:00 pm, CBSSN	No. 6	New Mexico	W 91–62	23–1 (10–1)	Lawlor Events Center (11,197); Reno, NV
February 16, 2019; 7:00 pm, ESPNU	No. 7	at Wyoming	W 82–49	24–1 (11–1)	Arena-Auditorium (5,287); Laramie, WY
February 20, 2019; 8:00 pm, CBSSN	No. 6	at San Diego State	L 57–65	24–2 (11–2)	Viejas Arena (12,414); San Diego, CA
February 23, 2019; 5:00 pm, CBSSN	No. 6	Fresno State	W 74–68	25–2 (12–2)	Lawlor Events Center (11,019); Reno, NV
February 27, 2019; 8:00 pm, CBSSN	No. 12	UNLV	W 89–73	26–2 (13–2)	Lawlor Events Center (11,289); Reno, NV
March 2, 2019; 5:30 pm, CBSSN	No. 12	at Utah State	L 76–81	26–3 (13–3)	Smith Spectrum (10,387); Logan, UT
March 6, 2019; 8:00 pm, ESPN2	No. 17	at Air Force	W 90–79	27–3 (14–3)	Clune Arena (3,852); Colorado Springs, CO
March 9, 2019; 7:30 pm, CBSSN	No. 17	San Diego State	W 81–53	28–3 (15–3)	Lawlor Events Center (11,243); Reno, NV
Mountain West tournament
March 14, 2019; 12:00 pm, CBSSN	(1) No. 14	vs. (8) Boise State; Quarterfinals	W 77–69	29–3	Thomas & Mack Center (7,518); Paradise, NV
March 15, 2019; 6:00 pm, CBSSN	(1) No. 14	vs. (4) San Diego State; Semifinals	L 56–65	29–4	Thomas & Mack Center (8,764); Paradise, NV
NCAA tournament
March 21, 2019*; 3:50 pm, TNT	(7 W) No. 20	vs. (10 W) Florida; First Round	L 61–70	29–5	Wells Fargo Arena (16,360); Des Moines, IA
*Non-conference game. (#) Tournament seedings in parentheses. W=West Source. All times are in Pacific Time.

== Rankings ==
Ranking movements Legend: ██ Increase in ranking ██ Decrease in ranking
	Week																				
Poll	Pre	1	2	3	4	5	6	7	8	9	10	11	12	13	14	15	16	17	18	19	Final
AP	7	6	6	5	6	7	6	6	6	10	10	7	8	6	7	6	12	17	14	20	Not released
Coaches	9	9^	7	6	6	7	6	6	5	11	10	7	7	6	6	6	13	18	17	20	23

*AP does not release post-NCAA Tournament rankings
^Coaches did not release a Week 2 poll.
