= 2018–19 NCAA Division I men's basketball season =

81st season of NCAA Division I Men's Basketball

- Preseason AP No. 1: Kansas Jayhawks
- Regular season: November 6, 2018 – March 17, 2019
- NCAA Tournament: 2019
- Tournament dates: March 19, 2019 – April 8, 2019
- National Championship: U.S. Bank Stadium; Minneapolis, Minnesota
- NCAA Champions: Virginia Cavaliers
- Other champions: Texas Longhorns (NIT), South Florida Bulls (CBI), Marshall Thundering Herd (CIT)
- Player of the Year (Naismith, Wooden): Zion Williamson, Duke Blue Devils

The 2018–19 NCAA Division I men's basketball season began on November 6, 2018. The first tournament was the 2K Sports Classic and the season concluded with the Final Four at U.S. Bank Stadium in Minneapolis, Minnesota, on April 8, 2019. Practices officially began on September 28, 2018. The season saw Zion Williamson dominate Player of the Year honors and media attention, while Virginia won its first NCAA Championship. The NCAA Championship Game between Virginia and Texas Tech would mark the final NCAA game with a 20-foot 9 inch three-point shot line, as it moved out to the FIBA standard of 22 feet and 2 inches the following year.

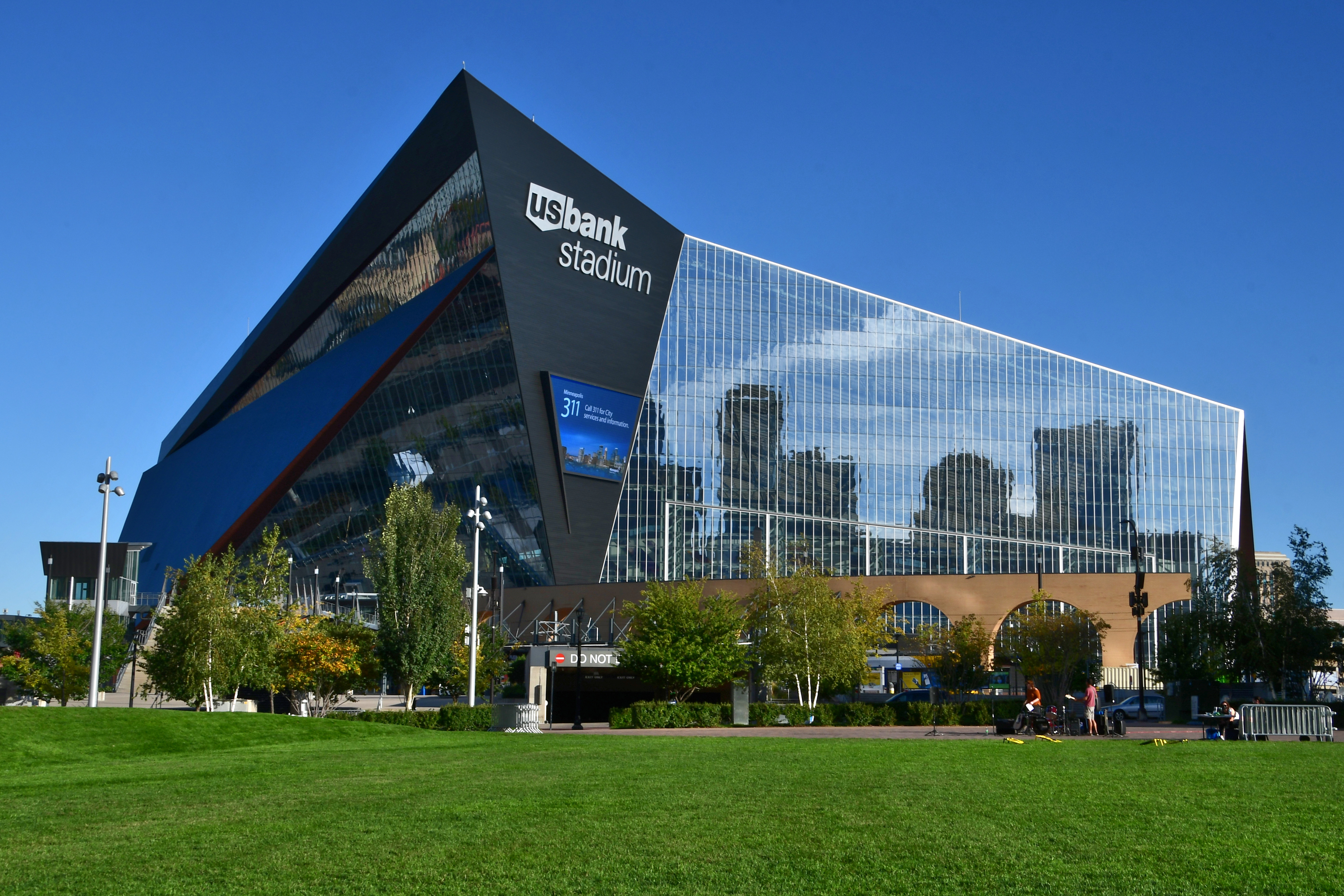
U.S. Bank Stadium in Minneapolis, Minnesota, hosted the NCAA men's Final Four.

== Rule changes ==
On February 22, 2019, the NCAA announced a set of experimental rules that it would use in the 2019 National Invitation Tournament.

The following rules were also used in the 2018 NIT:

- The three-point line was moved to the FIBA standard of 6.75 metres (22 ft 2 in). When the arc approached the sideline, it changed to a line parallel to and 1.02 metres (3 ft 4 in) from the sideline. (Note: FIBA's definition of the three-point arc calls for the line to be exactly 0.9 metres (2 ft 11 in) from the sideline until it intersects the 6.75 m arc. However, the FIBA court is officially defined as 15 metres (49 ft 3 in) wide, slightly narrower than the NCAA standard of 50 feet (15.24 m). On a FIBA court, the closest three-point distance, found along a line parallel to the baseline that passes through the center of the basket, is thus 6.6 metres (21 ft 8 in) from the center of the basket. Translating this distance to the NCAA court dimensions results in the line being the stated 1.02 m from the sidelines.)
- The free-throw lane was widened from the current college standard of 12 feet to the NBA standard of 16 feet.
- After an offensive rebound, the shot clock was reset to 20 seconds instead of the current NCAA standard of 30.

A set of rules relating to free throws that had been used in the 2017 NIT was used again in the 2019 edition, with one modification:

- Team foul counts, for purposes of determining bonus free throws, were reset to zero at the 10-minute mark of each half, effectively dividing the game into quarters for that purpose.
- The "one-and-one" was eliminated. All bonus free throw situations resulted in two free throws for the non-fouled team. This mirrored current practice in NCAA women's basketball, which has been played in quarters since the 2015–16 season.
- Teams entered the bonus upon the fifth team foul in each 10-minute segment.
- The team foul count was reset to zero at the start of any overtime period. Teams entered the bonus upon the fourth team foul in an overtime period.
- In a completely new feature, the NCAA adopted the NBA's bonus rule regarding team fouls in the last two minutes of any period. Teams entered the bonus on the second team foul in the last two minutes of a ten-minute segment or overtime period, regardless of the total team foul count at that point of the period.

== Season headlines ==
- May 23, 2018 – The NCAA announced its Academic Progress Rate (APR) sanctions for the 2018–19 school year. A total of nine programs in eight sports were declared ineligible for postseason play due to failure to meet the required APR benchmark, including the following Division I men's basketball team:
  - Alabama A&M
- May 29 – Conference USA announced a new men's basketball scheduling format that took effect with the 2018–19 season. The league now plays an 18-game schedule formatted as follows:
  - During the first 14 games of the conference season, each team plays its designated travel partner home-and-home, and single games against every other team.
  - At this point, teams are placed into three groups based on their conference standings through 14 games, with the top five teams in one group, the next five in a second group, and the bottom four teams in the final group. Teams play within their grouping for the final four games of the conference season, with home and away games determined by a preset formula.
  - Each team will be locked into a seed for the C-USA tournament that corresponds to its group. For example, teams in the top group will be assured the top five seeds. The specific seedings will be determined by conference record across the full league schedule.
- June 4 – The Sun Belt Conference announced a new men's basketball scheduling format similar to that announced by Conference USA the previous week. Effective with the 2019–20 season, the league was to have played a 20-game schedule formatted as follows:
  - The conference would split into East and West Divisions for scheduling purposes, though this split would not affect overall league standings.
    - East: Appalachian State, Coastal Carolina, Georgia Southern, Georgia State, South Alabama, Troy
    - West: Arkansas State, Little Rock, Louisiana, Louisiana–Monroe, Texas State, UT Arlington
  - For the first 16 games of the conference season, each team would play home-and-home against other divisional members and single games against teams in the other division.
  - After 16 conference games, teams would be divided into four "pods" based on their conference standings at that time. The top three teams would be assigned to Pod A, the next three to Pod B, and so on through Pod D for the bottom three teams. The final four games for each team would be home-and-homes against the other two teams in that pod.
  - Each team would be locked into a seed for the Sun Belt tournament that corresponds to its pod. For example, teams in Pod A would be assured the top three seeds. Unlike the C-USA system, the specific seed would be based strictly on standings in the final four conference games—not overall conference record.

A year later, the conference announced that it would place almost all of these changes on hold. The only part of the plan that was implemented on the original schedule was expansion of the conference schedule to 20 games.

- June 18 – Purdue University Fort Wayne (PFW), which was set to begin operation on July 1 following the dissolution of Indiana University – Purdue University Fort Wayne (IPFW), announced that the athletic program that it would inherit from IPFW, previously known as the Fort Wayne Mastodons, would become the Purdue Fort Wayne Mastodons. PFW also changed its colors from IPFW's former blue and silver scheme to the old gold and black used by its new parent institution.
- August 8 – In response to the sport's ongoing corruption scandal, the NCAA announced a suite of major changes to its rules governing college basketball:
  - Certain high school players and college players with remaining eligibility will now be allowed to have formal relationships with agents while retaining college eligibility. These agents must be certified by the NCAA. College players can be represented if they have formally requested an evaluation of their NBA prospects from the league. Should the NBA change the age limit for the draft to once again allow players to be drafted directly from high school, the rule also allows for high school players to be represented, effective on the July 1 before their senior year, if USA Basketball has designated them as "elite senior prospects". However, these relationships will be allowed only during the draft process, and must be terminated if the player returns to school.
  - Certain players who declare for the NBA draft but are not selected will be free to return to their former schools, as long as they have not signed professional contracts, or have not complied with NCAA rules for relationships with agents, in the meantime. However, this privilege is only extended to players who have requested NBA evaluation of their draft prospects and have been invited to the NBA Draft Combine.
  - School presidents, chancellors, and athletics staff members are now contractually required to comply with all NCAA investigations. This effectively gives the NCAA subpoena power in its investigations, which it previously lacked.
  - Presidents and chancellors are now personally accountable to the NCAA for athletic department compliance with NCAA rules.
  - The NCAA and its Committee on Infractions can now use information obtained in outside investigations in its infractions process. Previously, the NCAA could not use such information.
- August 22 – The NCAA announced that effective immediately, the RPI will no longer be used in the selection process for the Division I men's tournament. It was replaced by the NCAA Evaluation Tool (NET), which takes into account the following:
  - Game results
  - Strength of schedule
  - Location (home, away, or neutral site)
  - Scoring margin—Teams will receive no added credit for victory margins above 10 points. Additionally, overtime games will be assigned a scoring margin of 1 point, regardless of the actual score.
  - Net offensive and defensive efficiency
  - Quality of wins and losses—The NCAA will continue to use its "quadrant" system, introduced for last year's tournament selection process, to classify individual wins and losses.
  - All games will be evaluated equally; there is no bonus or penalty for when a game is played within the season.

The NET was adopted only for men's basketball. All other sports that use selection committees to determine NCAA tournament entries, including the Division I women's basketball tournament, continue to use their own versions of the RPI.

- September 10 – The Northeast Conference (NEC) announced that Merrimack College would start a transition from the NCAA Division II Northeast-10 Conference and join the NEC effective July 1, 2019. The Warriors will not be eligible for the NCAA tournament until becoming a full D-I member in 2023–24.
- September 28 – LSU player Wayde Sims, set to play his junior season for the Tigers, was killed in a shooting near the Southern University campus in Baton Rouge, home to both schools.
- October 3 – Long Island University announced that it would merge its two current athletic programs—the LIU Brooklyn Blackbirds, full members of the NEC, and the Division II LIU Post Pioneers—effective with the 2019–20 school year. The new program will compete under the LIU name with a new nickname and maintain LIU Brooklyn's Division I and NEC memberships. This change will have minimal effect on the existing LIU Brooklyn men's basketball program, as LIU has announced that the unified basketball team will be based at the Brooklyn campus.
- October 23 – The Associated Press preseason All-American team was released. Purdue guard Carsen Edwards was the leading vote-getter (63 votes). Joining him on the team were North Carolina forward Luke Maye (52 votes), Duke guard R. J. Barrett (50), Kansas forward Dedric Lawson (30), Wisconsin forward Ethan Happ (23) and Nevada forward Caleb Martin (23).
- January 11, 2019 – The Western Athletic Conference announced that Dixie State University (Note: Now known as Utah Tech University Trailblazers) would start a transition from Division II and join the conference in July 2020.
- January 19 – The last two undefeated teams lost. First, Michigan suffered a 54–64 point loss at Wisconsin. Later on in the day, Virginia lost on the road to Duke by the score of 72–70.
- February 13 – Florida A&M announces four athletic teams, including men's basketball, are ineligible for postseason play due to failure to meet the APR multi-year threshold.
- February 20
  - North Carolina's 88–72 upset of top-ranked Duke was overshadowed by a freak injury suffered by superstar Duke freshman Zion Williamson. On the Blue Devils' first possession of the game, Williamson's left shoe catastrophically failed, with the sole completely separating from the midsole. Williamson suffered a sprained right knee in the incident, and did not return to the game. The following day, the injury was confirmed to be minor; although Williamson was listed as day-to-day immediately after the injury, he did not return to action until the Blue Devils' ACC tournament opener on March 14.
  - On his way home from a postgame meal after Syracuse's 69–49 upset of Louisville, Orange head coach Jim Boeheim was involved in a fatal car accident. A car crashed on Interstate 690 in Syracuse, and the occupants attempted to cross over to the median. Boeheim hit one of them while swerving to avoid those with disabilities vehicle, and the victim died in a local hospital. Neither driver involved in the incident was found to be impaired, and Syracuse's police chief initially indicated that no charges would be filed in the case.
- March 5 – Kansas was eliminated from the race for the Big 12 Conference regular-season title with an 81–68 loss at Oklahoma, ending the Jayhawks' streak of consecutive conference regular-season titles at a Division I men's record of 14.
- March 7 – The district attorney for Onondaga County, New York issued his report on the fatal car accident in which Jim Boeheim was involved. According to the report, the disabled vehicle did not have lights on, and also had inoperable rear marker lights. Additionally, the passengers of that vehicle, including the individual who was struck and killed, were wearing dark clothing. Boeheim was officially cleared of wrongdoing, and no charges would be filed against anyone involved.
- March 8 – In further fallout from the corruption scandal, LSU suspended head coach Will Wade indefinitely. This action came the day after it was revealed that FBI wiretaps had intercepted calls between Wade and Christian Dawkins, an aspiring agent who had been convicted on federal felony charges relating to the corruption scandal, during one of which Wade referenced a "strong-ass offer" made to a recruit.
- March 15 – Long Island University announced that its merged athletic program would compete as the LIU Sharks.
- April 14 – Will Wade was reinstated as LSU head coach after a meeting between the LSU athletic department, Wade, and NCAA compliance officials.

=== Milestones and records ===
- During the season, the following players reached the 2,000 career point milestone – Marshall guard Jon Elmore, Montana State guard Tyler Hall, Wofford guard Fletcher Magee, Cornell guard Matt Morgan, Lipscomb guard Garrison Mathews, Georgia Southern guard Tookie Brown, Eastern Kentucky forward Nick Mayo, Northern Colorado guard Jordan Davis, Hofstra guard Justin Wright-Foreman, Wisconsin forward Ethan Happ, Charlotte guard Jon Davis, UNC Greensboro guard Francis Alonso, Purdue Fort Wayne guard John Konchar, Appalachian State guard Ronshad Shabazz, Northern Kentucky forward Drew McDonald, Nevada swingman Jordan Caroline, Wyoming guard Justin James, Mississippi State guard Quinndary Weatherspoon, and Clemson guard Marcquise Reed.
  - Konchar additionally became the first Division I men's player with 2,000 points, 1,000 rebounds, 500 assists and 200 steals in his career.
- Two players reached the 3,000-point milestone in February. First, Campbell guard Chris Clemons reached the mark on February 16 in the Fighting Camels' 76–71 loss to Presbyterian. Then, on February 23, South Dakota State forward Mike Daum reached the mark in the Jackrabbits' 94–89 win over South Dakota.
- November 12 – Buffalo was ranked 25th in the AP top 25 poll – signifying the first time in school history that the program cracked the top 25.
- November 24 – High Point head coach Tubby Smith won his 600th career Division I game, as his Panthers defeated East Carolina 55–52.
- December 3—Furman was ranked 25th in the AP top 25 poll – signifying the first time in school history that the program cracked the top 25.
- December 7—Mike Daum became the Summit League's all-time leading scorer. In a 42-point outing against Southern, Daum passed former Oral Roberts forward Caleb Green's conference record 2,504 points.
- December 21 – Chris Clemons of Campbell became the Big South Conference's all-time leading scorer. He passed VMI guard Reggie Williams' 2,556 career points for the honor.
- January 19 – Montana State's Tyler Hall became the Big Sky Conference all-time leading scorer, breaking a mark of 2,169 set the previous season by Bogdan Bliznyuk of Eastern Washington.
- February 23 – Syracuse drew a crowd of 35,642 in the Carrier Dome for its 75–65 loss to then top-ranked Duke, breaking the school's own record attendance of 35,446 for an on-campus college basketball game. Not only was this a record, it was also greater than the home attendances of more than half of Division I men's teams in the entire regular season (180 out of 353).
- February 25 – Wofford made the AP top 25 for the first time in the school's history, entering the poll at #24.
- March 3 – Marshall guard Jon Elmore became the Conference USA all-time leading scorer, passing UTEP's Stefon Jackson. Earlier in the season, Elmore became the conference's all-time assist leader (passing UTEP's Julyan Stone), making him the only player currently leading a conference in both categories all-time.
  - Later in the season (March 26), in a quarterfinal match of the CollegeInsider Postseason tournament, Elmore made three 3-pointers to become Conference USA's all-time leader in that category. He surpassed the previous record of 345 set by Charlotte's Jobey Thomas in 2002.
- March 15 – Michigan State head coach Tom Izzo won his 600th career Division I game as the Spartans defeated Ohio State 77–70 in the quarterfinals of the Big Ten Conference tournament.
- March 16 – Washington guard Matisse Thybulle broke former Oregon State star Gary Payton's 29 year-old Pac-12 Conference career steals record as he collected his 322nd steal in the Huskies' Pac-12 tournament final loss to Oregon.
- March 20 – Wichita State head coach Gregg Marshall won his 500th career Division I game as the Shockers defeated Furman 76–70 in the 1st round of the NIT.
- March 21 – The first day of the first round of the NCAA tournament saw one significant milestone achieved and one major record broken:
  - First, in an afternoon West Regional game, Murray State's Ja Morant became the first player with a triple-double in the NCAA tournament since Draymond Green in 2012, with 17 points, 11 rebounds, and 16 assists in the Racers' 83–64 win over Marquette.
  - Then, in a late-evening Midwest Regional game, Wofford's Fletcher Magee became the Division I career leader in three-pointers, surpassing Oakland's Travis Bader in the Terriers' 84–68 win over Seton Hall. Magee's seven three-pointers gave him 509 for his career to Bader's previous record of 504. This was also Wofford's first-ever NCAA tournament win.

== Conference membership changes ==
Six schools joined new conferences for the 2018–19 season. Four schools switched between Division I conferences for the 2018–19 season. In addition, two schools moved from Division II starting this season and are ineligible for NCAA-sponsored postseason play until completing their D-I transitions in 2022.

School	Former conference	New conference
California Baptist	Pacific West Conference (D-II)	Western Athletic Conference
Hampton	Mid-Eastern Athletic Conference	Big South Conference
Liberty	Big South Conference	ASUN Conference
North Alabama	Gulf South Conference (D-II)	ASUN Conference
North Dakota	Big Sky Conference	Summit League
USC Upstate	ASUN Conference	Big South Conference

In addition to the schools changing conferences, the 2018–19 season was the last for Savannah State in D-I with its decision to reclassify all of its sports to D-II.

Also, one D-I member adopted a new institutional and athletic identity. The 2017–18 school year was the last for Indiana University – Purdue University Fort Wayne (IPFW) as a single institution; the school's health sciences programs were taken over by Indiana University as Indiana University Fort Wayne, while all other academic programs are now governed by Purdue University as Purdue University Fort Wayne (PFW). As noted previously, the former IPFW athletic program was inherited by PFW and is now known as the Purdue Fort Wayne Mastodons.

== Arenas ==
=== New arenas ===
- Elon began play at the new Schar Center, which replaced their home of 69 seasons, Alumni Gym.
- Marquette along with the NBA's Milwaukee Bucks moved into the new Fiserv Forum, which replaced Bradley Center after 30 years.
- After 32 seasons at the off-campus Burton Coliseum, McNeese State opened the new on-campus Health and Human Performance Education Complex (H&HP Complex).
- The two new Division I entries for 2018 continued to play at existing on-campus facilities. California Baptist plays at the CBU Events Center, which opened in 2017, and North Alabama plays at Flowers Hall, their home since 1972.

=== Arenas reopening ===
Four teams returned to newly renovated arenas, all of which were closed for the 2017–18 season.

- Cincinnati returned to Fifth Third Arena.
- Houston initially planned to reopen the renamed Fertitta Center (originally Hofheinz Pavilion) by the start of the 2018–19 season, but the new arena did not open until December 1, 2018, six games into the season. The Cougars' first game in the renovated facility was a 65–61 upset of then-#18 Oregon.
- Northwestern returned to Welsh–Ryan Arena.
- Villanova returned the bulk of its schedule to the renamed Finneran Pavilion (originally duPont Pavilion and later The Pavilion).

=== Temporary arenas ===
- With the reopening of Fertitta Center delayed, Houston began the 2018–19 season at Texas Southern's Health and Physical Education Arena, where the Cougars played most of their 2017–18 home games.
- Due to delays in the construction of the new UPMC Events Center, originally scheduled to open in January 2019 but since delayed to that summer, Robert Morris played its entire home schedule at the Student Recreation and Fitness Center, a facility that opened in 2017 at the on-campus North Athletic Complex as part of the UPMC Events Center project.

== Season outlook ==
=== Pre–season polls ===
The top 25 from the AP and USA Today Coaches Polls.

AP
Ranking	Team
1	Kansas (37)
2	Kentucky (19)
3	Gonzaga (1)
4	Duke (4)
5	Virginia (2)
6	Tennessee (1)
7	Nevada
8	North Carolina
9	Villanova (1)
10	Michigan State
11	Auburn
12	Kansas State
13	West Virginia
14	Oregon
15	Virginia Tech
16	Syracuse
17	Florida State
18	Mississippi State
19	Michigan
20	TCU
21	UCLA
22	Clemson
23	LSU
24	Purdue
25	Washington

USA Today Coaches
Ranking	Team
1	Kansas (14)
2	Kentucky (12)
3	Duke (4)
4	Gonzaga (1)
5	Virginia (1)
6	Tennessee
7	North Carolina
8	Villanova
9	Nevada
10	Michigan State
11	Kansas State
12	Auburn
13	West Virginia
14	Syracuse
15	Florida State
16	Oregon
17	Virginia Tech
18	Michigan
19	Mississippi State
20	UCLA
21	TCU
22	Purdue
23	Clemson
24	Washington
25	Nebraska

== Regular season ==
=== Early season tournaments ===
Name	Dates	Location	No. teams	Champion
2K Empire Classic	November 15–16	Madison Square Garden (Manhattan, NY)	4	Iowa
Charleston Classic	November 15–16, 18	TD Arena (Charleston, SC)	8	Virginia Tech
Myrtle Beach Invitational	November 15–20, 18	HTC Center (Conway, SC)	8	UCF
The Islands of the Bahamas Showcase	November 16–18	Kendal Isaacs National Gymnasium (Nassau, BAH)	8	Georgia Southern
Jersey Mike's Jamaica Classic	November 16–18	Montego Bay Convention Centre (Montego Bay, Jamaica)	8	Loyola Marymount
John Bach Classic	November 16–18	Rose Hill Gymnasium (Bronx, NY)	4	Fordham
Paradise Jam tournament	November 16–19	Sports and Fitness Center (Saint Thomas, VI)	8	Kansas State
Hall of Fame Tip Off	November 17–18	Mohegan Sun Arena (Uncasville, CT)	4	Michigan
Vancouver Showcase	November 18–20	Vancouver Convention Centre (Vancouver, BC)	4	Minnesota
CBE Hall of Fame Classic	November 19–20	Sprint Center (Kansas City, MO)	4	Texas Tech
Legends Classic	November 19–20	Barclays Center (Brooklyn, NY)	4	St. John's
Cayman Islands Classic	November 19–21	John Gray Gymnasium (George Town, Cayman Islands)	8	Creighton
Gulf Coast Showcase	November 19–21	Hertz Arena (Estero, FL)	8	Toledo
Maui Invitational	November 19–21	Lahaina Civic Center (Lahaina, HI)	8	Gonzaga
MGM Resorts Main Event	November 19, 21	T-Mobile Arena (Las Vegas, NV)	8	Utah Valley (Middleweight Bracket) Arizona State (Heavyweight Bracket)
Cancún Challenge	November 20–21	Moon Palace Golf & Spa Resort (Cancún, MX)	8	Bradley (Riviera Division) Jacksonville State (Mayan Division)
Battle 4 Atlantis	November 21–23	Imperial Arena (Nassau, BAH)	8	Virginia
NIT Season Tip-Off	November 21, 23	Barclays Center (Brooklyn, NY)	4	Kansas
Las Vegas Invitational	November 22–23	Orleans Arena (Las Vegas, NV)	4	Michigan State
AdvoCare Invitational	November 22–23, 25	HP Field House (Lake Buena Vista, FL)	8	Villanova
Wooden Legacy	November 22–23, 25	Titan Gym (Fullerton, CA)	4	Seton Hall
Barclays Center Classic	November 23–24	Barclays Center (Brooklyn, NY)	2	Pittsburgh
Emerald Coast Classic	November 23–24	The Arena at NFSC (Niceville, FL)	4	Cincinnati
Basketball Hall of Fame Belfast Classic	November 29 – December 1	SSE Arena (Belfast, Northern Ireland)	4	Marist (Samson Bracket) Buffalo (Goliath Bracket)
Battle at the Boardwalk Classic	December 21–22	Boardwalk Hall (Atlantic City, NJ)	4	La Salle
Las Vegas Classic	December 22–23	Orleans Arena (Las Vegas, NV)	4	Drake (Orleans Bracket) Cal State Northridge (Visitors Bracket)
Diamond Head Classic	December 22–23, 25	Stan Sheriff Center (Honolulu, HI)	8	TCU

=== Upsets ===
An upset is a victory by an underdog team. In the context of NCAA Division I Men's Basketball this generally constitutes an unranked team defeating a team currently ranked In the Top 25. This list will highlight those upsets of ranked teams by unranked teams as well as upsets of #1 teams. Rankings are from the AP poll.

Bold type indicates winning teams in "true road games"-i.e., those played on an opponent's home court (including secondary homes, such as Intrust Bank Arena for Wichita State).

Winner	Score	Loser	Date	Tournament/Event
**Buffalo**	99–94^{OT}	#13 West Virginia	November 9, 2018	
Indiana	96–73	#24 Marquette	November 14, 2018	Gavitt Tipoff Games
UConn	83–76	#15 Syracuse	November 15, 2018	2K Empire Classic/Rivalry
Iowa	77–69	#13 Oregon	November 15, 2018	2K Empire Classic
**Furman**	76–68^{OT}	#8 Villanova	November 17, 2018	
Arizona State	72–67	#15 Mississippi State	November 19, 2018	MGM Resorts Main Event
**Lipscomb**	73–64	#18 TCU	November 20, 2018	
#3 Gonzaga	89–87	#1 Duke	November 21, 2018	Maui Invitational
Creighton	87–82	#16 Clemson	November 21, 2018	Cayman Islands Classic
Texas	92–89	#7 North Carolina	November 22, 2018	Las Vegas Invitational
Villanova	66–60	#14 Florida State	November 25, 2018	AdvoCare Invitational
Oklahoma State	90–77	#19 LSU	November 25, 2018	AdvoCare Invitational
**Texas Southern**	89–84	#18 Oregon	November 26, 2018	
Penn State	63–62	#13 Virginia Tech	November 27, 2018	ACC–Big Ten Challenge
Louisville	82–78^{OT}	#9 Michigan State	November 27, 2018	ACC–Big Ten Challenge
**Syracuse**	72–62	#16 Ohio State	November 28, 2018	ACC–Big Ten Challenge
**Radford**	62–59	#17 Texas	November 30, 2018	
Marquette	83–71	#12 Kansas State	December 1, 2018	
Houston	65–61	#18 Oregon	December 1, 2018	
Minnesota	85–78	#24 Nebraska	December 5, 2018	
Purdue	62–60	#23 Maryland	December 6, 2018	
Seton Hall	84–83^{OT}	#9 Kentucky	December 8, 2018	Citi Hoops Classic
Tulsa	47–46	#16 Kansas State	December 8, 2018	
Marquette	74–69^{OT}	#12 Wisconsin	December 8, 2018	
#7 Tennessee	76–73	#1 Gonzaga	December 9, 2018	Jerry Colangelo Classic
Penn	78–75	#17 Villanova	December 11, 2018	Philadelphia Big 5
**Old Dominion**	68–62	#25 Syracuse	December 15, 2018	
Vanderbilt	81–65	#18 Arizona State	December 17, 2018	
NC State	78–71	#7 Auburn	December 19, 2018	
LSU	75–57	#24 Furman	December 21, 2018	
#18 Arizona State	80–76	#1 Kansas	December 22, 2018	
**Princeton**	67–66	#17 Arizona State	December 29, 2018	
Western Kentucky	83–76	#15 Wisconsin	December 29, 2018	
St. John's	89–69	#16 Marquette	January 1, 2019	
Maryland	74–72	#24 Nebraska	January 2, 2019	
Purdue	86–70	#25 Iowa	January 3, 2019	
**Minnesota**	59–52	#22 Wisconsin	January 3, 2018	
Alabama	77–75	#13 Kentucky	January 5, 2019	
Iowa State	77–60	#5 Kansas	January 5, 2019	
New Mexico	85–58	#6 Nevada	January 5, 2019	
Villanova	76–71	#24 St. John's	January 8, 2019	
Baylor	73–70	#20 Iowa State	January 8, 2019	
South Carolina	87–82^{OT}	#14 Mississippi State	January 8, 2019	
Temple	73–69	#17 Houston	January 9, 2019	
Ole Miss	82–67	#11 Auburn	January 9, 2019	
Rutgers	64–61	#16 Ohio State	January 9, 2019	
Maryland	78–75	#22 Indiana	January 11, 2019	
**Kansas State**	58–57	#20 Iowa State	January 12, 2019	
**Louisville**	83–62	#12 North Carolina	January 12, 2019	
**Ole Miss**	81–77	#14 Mississippi State	January 12, 2019	
Iowa	72–62	#16 Ohio State	January 12, 2019	
**DePaul**	79–71	#24 St. John's	January 12, 2019	
**Nebraska**	66–51	#25 Indiana	January 14, 2019	
Pittsburgh	75–62	#11 Florida State	January 14, 2019	
**Syracuse**	95–91^{OT}	#1 Duke	January 14, 2019	
Wake Forest	71–67	#17 NC State	January 15, 2019	
**LSU**	83–69	#18 Ole Miss	January 15, 2019	
**Kansas State**	74–61	#20 Oklahoma	January 16, 2019	
**Iowa State**	68–64	#8 Texas Tech	January 16, 2019	
Wisconsin	64–54	#2 Michigan	January 19, 2019	
West Virginia	65–64	#7 Kansas	January 19, 2019	
Purdue	70–55	#25 Indiana	January 19, 2019	Rivalry/Indiana National Guard Governor's Cup
Baylor	73–62	#8 Texas Tech	January 19, 2019	
Texas	75–72	#20 Oklahoma	January 19, 2019	
Boston College	87–82	#11 Florida State	January 20, 2019	
South Carolina	80–77	#16 Auburn	January 22, 2019	
Kansas State	58–45	#14 Texas Tech	January 22, 2019	
Northern Illinois	77–75	#14 Buffalo	January 22, 2019	
Alabama	74–53	#20 Ole Miss	January 22, 2019	
Illinois	78–67	#13 Maryland	January 26, 2019	B1G Super Saturday
Purdue	73–63	#6 Michigan State	January 27, 2019	
Minnesota	92–87	#19 Iowa	January 27, 2019	
Texas	73–63	#11 Kansas	January 29, 2019	
Alabama	83–79	#22 Mississippi State	January 29, 2019	
Iowa	74–59	#5 Michigan	February 1, 2019	
Bowling Green	92–88	#18 Buffalo	February 1, 2019	
**Arkansas**	90–89	#19 LSU	February 2, 2019	
**Indiana**	79–75^{OT}	#6 Michigan State	February 2, 2019	
Illinois	79–74	#9 Michigan State	February 5, 2019	
**St. John's**	70–69	#10 Marquette	February 5, 2019	
Kansas State	74–67	#13 Kansas	February 5, 2019	Sunflower Showdown
Clemson	59–51	#11 Virginia Tech	February 9, 2019	
**TCU**	92–83	#17 Iowa State	February 9, 2019	
Penn State	75–69	#6 Michigan	February 12, 2019	
#5 Kentucky	86–69	#1 Tennessee	February 16, 2019	Rivalry
St. John's	71–65	#13 Villanova	February 17, 2019	
**Baylor**	73–69	#19 Iowa State	February 19, 2019	
Georgetown	85–73	#17 Villanova	February 20, 2019	
Syracuse	69–49	#18 Louisville	February 20, 2019	
**Florida**	82–77^{OT}	#13 LSU	February 20, 2019	
**#8 North Carolina**	88–72	#1 Duke	February 20, 2019	Rivalry
San Diego State	65–57	#6 Nevada	February 20, 2019	
TCU	75–72	#19 Iowa State	February 23, 2019	
Xavier	66–54	#17 Villanova	February 24, 2019	
Ohio State	90–70	#22 Iowa	February 26, 2019	
Indiana	75–73^{2OT}	#19 Wisconsin	February 26, 2019	
Penn State	78–61	#17 Maryland	February 27, 2019	
Villanova	67–61	#10 Marquette	February 27, 2019	
California	76–73	#25 Washington	February 28, 2019	
Indiana	63–62	#6 Michigan State	March 2, 2019	
**UCF**	69–64	#8 Houston	March 2, 2019	
**Rutgers**	86–72	#22 Iowa	March 2, 2019	
Utah State	81–76	#12 Nevada	March 2, 2019	
**Creighton**	66–60	#10 Marquette	March 3, 2019	
Minnesota	73–69	#11 Purdue	March 5, 2019	
Oklahoma	81–68	#13 Kansas	March 5, 2019	
Seton Hall	73–64	#16 Marquette	March 6, 2019	
Auburn	84–80	#5 Tennessee	March 9, 2019	
Seton Hall	79–75	#23 Villanova	March 9, 2019	
**Georgetown**	86–84	#16 Marquette	March 9, 2019	
Temple	67–62	#25 UCF	March 9, 2019	
Saint Mary's	60–47	#1 Gonzaga	March 12, 2019	West Coast tournament
Nebraska	69–61	#21 Maryland	March 14, 2019	Big Ten tournament
West Virginia	79–74	#7 Texas Tech	March 14, 2019	Big 12 tournament
Florida	76–73	#9 LSU	March 15, 2019	SEC tournament
Minnesota	75–73	#13 Purdue	March 15, 2019	Big Ten tournament
Iowa State	63–59	#15 Kansas State	March 15, 2019	Big 12 Tournament
San Diego State	65–56	#14 Nevada	March 15, 2019	Mountain West tournament
Seton Hall	81–79	#23 Marquette	March 15, 2019	Big East tournament
Iowa State	78–66	#17 Kansas	March 16, 2019	Big 12 Tournament

In addition to the above listed upsets in which an unranked team defeated a ranked team, there were six non-Division I teams to defeat a Division I team this season. Bold type indicates winning teams in "true road games"—i.e., those played on an opponent's home court (including secondary homes).

Winner	Score	Loser	Date	Tournament/event
**St. Edward's** (Division II)	77–76	UTSA	November 7, 2018	
**Loyola (LA)** (NAIA)	79–78	McNeese State	November 16, 2018	
Northwest Nazarene (Division II)	77–73	Idaho	November 23, 2018	Vandal Holiday Hoops Showcase
**William Carey** (NAIA)	78–72	Southern Miss	November 25, 2018	
**Fayetteville State** (Division II)	80–63	UNC Asheville	December 29, 2018	
**Lincoln (PA)** (Division II)	77–75	Morgan State	January 3, 2019	

=== Conference winners and tournaments ===
Each of the 32 Division I athletic conferences ends its regular season with a single-elimination tournament. The team with the best regular-season record in each conference is given the number one seed in each tournament, with tiebreakers used as needed in the case of ties for the top seeding. The winners of these tournaments receive automatic invitations to the 2019 NCAA Division I men's basketball tournament.

Conference	Regular season first place	Conference player of the year	Conference coach of the Year	Conference tournament	Tournament venue (city)	Tournament winner
America East Conference	Vermont	Anthony Lamb, Vermont	John Becker, Vermont	2019 America East men's basketball tournament	Campus sites	Vermont
American Athletic Conference	Houston	Jarron Cumberland, Cincinnati	Kelvin Sampson, Houston	2019 American Athletic Conference men's basketball tournament	FedEx Forum (Memphis, TN)	Cincinnati
Atlantic 10 Conference	VCU	Jón Axel Guðmundsson, Davidson	Mike Rhoades, VCU	2019 Atlantic 10 men's basketball tournament	Barclays Center (Brooklyn, NY)	Saint Louis
Atlantic Coast Conference	Virginia (Note: Top seed in conference tournament.) and North Carolina	Zion Williamson, Duke	Tony Bennett, Virginia	2019 ACC men's basketball tournament	Spectrum Center (Charlotte, NC)	Duke
Atlantic Sun Conference	Lipscomb and Liberty	Garrison Mathews, Lipscomb	Casey Alexander, Lipscomb	2019 ASUN men's basketball tournament	Campus sites	Liberty
Big 12 Conference	Kansas State and Texas Tech	Jarrett Culver, Texas Tech	Chris Beard, Texas Tech	2019 Big 12 men's basketball tournament	Sprint Center (Kansas City, MO)	Iowa State
Big East Conference	Villanova	Markus Howard, Marquette	Jay Wright, Villanova	2019 Big East men's basketball tournament	Madison Square Garden (New York City, NY)	Villanova
Big Sky Conference	Montana	Jordan Davis, Northern Colorado	Jeff Linder, Northern Colorado	2019 Big Sky Conference men's basketball tournament	CenturyLink Arena (Boise, ID)	Montana
Big South Conference	Campbell and Radford	Chris Clemons, Campbell	Kevin McGeehan, Campbell	2019 Big South Conference men's basketball tournament	First round: Campus sites Quarterfinals/semifinals: #1 seed Final: Top surviving seed	Gardner–Webb
Big Ten Conference	Michigan State and Purdue	Cassius Winston, Michigan State	Matt Painter, Purdue	2019 Big Ten Conference men's basketball tournament	United Center (Chicago, IL)	Michigan State
Big West Conference	UC Irvine	Lamine Diane, Cal State Northridge	Russell Turner, UC Irvine	2019 Big West Conference men's basketball tournament	Honda Center (Anaheim, CA)	UC Irvine
Colonial Athletic Association	Hofstra	Justin Wright-Foreman, Hofstra	Joe Mihalich, Hofstra	2019 CAA men's basketball tournament	North Charleston Coliseum (North Charleston, SC)	Northeastern
Conference USA	Old Dominion	B. J. Stith, Old Dominion	Jeff Jones, Old Dominion	2019 Conference USA men's basketball tournament	Ford Center (Frisco, TX)	Old Dominion
Horizon League	Wright State and Northern Kentucky	Drew McDonald, Northern Kentucky	Scott Nagy, Wright State	2019 Horizon League men's basketball tournament	Quarterfinals: Campus sites Semifinals and final: Little Caesars Arena (Detroit, MI)	Northern Kentucky
Ivy League	Harvard and Yale	Miye Oni, Yale	Mike Martin, Brown	2019 Ivy League men's basketball tournament	Payne Whitney Gymnasium (New Haven, CT)	Yale
Metro Atlantic Athletic Conference	Iona	Cameron Young, Quinnipiac	Tim Cluess, Iona	2019 MAAC men's basketball tournament	Times Union Center (Albany, NY)	Iona
Mid-American Conference	Buffalo (East) and Toledo (West)	C. J. Massinburg, Buffalo	Nate Oats, Buffalo	2019 Mid-American Conference men's basketball tournament	First round: Campus sites Remainder: Quicken Loans Arena (Cleveland, OH)	Buffalo
Mid-Eastern Athletic Conference	Norfolk State	R. J. Cole, Howard	Robert Jones, Norfolk State	2019 MEAC men's basketball tournament	Norfolk Scope (Norfolk, VA)	North Carolina Central
Missouri Valley Conference	Loyola (IL) and Drake	Marques Townes, Loyola (IL)	Darian DeVries, Drake	2019 Missouri Valley Conference men's basketball tournament	Enterprise Center (St. Louis, MO)	Bradley
Mountain West Conference	Nevada and Utah State	Sam Merrill, Utah State	Craig Smith, Utah State	2019 Mountain West Conference men's basketball tournament	Thomas & Mack Center (Paradise, NV)	Utah State
Northeast Conference	Saint Francis (PA) and Fairleigh Dickinson	Keith Braxton, Saint Francis (PA)	Rob Krimmel, Saint Francis (PA)	2019 Northeast Conference men's basketball tournament	Campus sites	Fairleigh Dickinson
Ohio Valley Conference	Belmont and Murray State	Ja Morant, Murray State	Rick Byrd, Belmont	2019 Ohio Valley Conference men's basketball tournament	Ford Center (Evansville, IN)	Murray State
Pac-12 Conference	Washington	Jaylen Nowell, Washington	Mike Hopkins, Washington	2019 Pac-12 Conference men's basketball tournament	T-Mobile Arena (Paradise, NV)	Oregon
Patriot League	Colgate and Bucknell	Rapolas Ivanauskas, Colgate	Matt Langel, Colgate	2019 Patriot League men's basketball tournament	Campus sites	Colgate
Southeastern Conference	LSU	Grant Williams, Tennessee	Kermit Davis, Ole Miss	2019 SEC men's basketball tournament	Bridgestone Arena (Nashville, TN)	Auburn
Southern Conference	Wofford	Fletcher Magee, Wofford	Mike Young, Wofford	2019 Southern Conference men's basketball tournament	U.S. Cellular Center (Asheville, NC)	Wofford
Southland Conference	Sam Houston State	Cameron Delaney, Sam Houston State	Joe Golding, Abilene Christian	2019 Southland Conference men's basketball tournament	Leonard E. Merrell Center (Katy, TX)	Abilene Christian
Southwestern Athletic Conference	Prairie View A&M	Jeremy Combs, Texas Southern	Byron Smith, Prairie View A&M	2019 SWAC men's basketball tournament	Quarterfinals: Campus sites Semifinals and final: Bill Harris Arena (Birmingham, AL)	Prairie View A&M
Summit League	South Dakota State	Mike Daum, South Dakota State	Derrin Hansen, Omaha	2019 Summit League men's basketball tournament	Denny Sanford Premier Center (Sioux Falls, SD)	North Dakota State
Sun Belt Conference	Georgia State	Tookie Brown, Georgia Southern	Chris Ogden, UT Arlington	2019 Sun Belt Conference men's basketball tournament	First round: Campus sites Remainder: Lakefront Arena (New Orleans, LA)	Georgia State
West Coast Conference	Gonzaga	Rui Hachimura, Gonzaga	Mark Few, Gonzaga	2019 West Coast Conference men's basketball tournament	Orleans Arena (Paradise, NV)	Saint Mary's
Western Athletic Conference	New Mexico State	Jake Toolson, Utah Valley	Chris Jans, New Mexico State	2019 WAC men's basketball tournament	Orleans Arena (Paradise, NV)	New Mexico State

=== Statistical leaders ===
Source for additional stats categories

**Points per game**			**Rebounds per game**			**Assists per game**			**Steals per game**		
Player	School	PPG	Player	School	RPG	Player	School	APG	Player	School	SPG
Chris Clemons	Campbell	30.1	Nico Carvacho	Colorado St.	12.9	Ja Morant	Murray St.	10.0	Matisse Thybulle	Washington	3.50
Justin Wright-Foreman	Hofstra	27.1	Devontae Cacok	UNC Wilmington	12.3	Kai Toews	UNC Wilmington	7.7	Brian Beard Jr.	FIU	2.97
Antoine Davis	Detroit Mercy	26.1	Cletrell Pope	Bethune–Cookman	12.2	Cassius Winston	Michigan St.	7.5	Javon Levi	UTRGV	2.95
Mike Daum	S. Dakota St.	25.3	Mike Daum	S. Dakota St.	11.7	Josh Sharkey	Samford	7.2	Tremont Waters	LSU	2.91
Markus Howard	Marquette	25.0	John Mooney	Notre Dame	11.2	Tyree Griffin	Southern Miss	7.1	Isaiah Miller	UNC Greensboro	2.89

**Blocked shots per game**			**Field goal percentage**			**Three-point field goal percentage**			**Free throw percentage**		
Player	School	BPG	Player	School	FG%	Player	School	3FG%	Player	School	FT%
Brandon Gilbeck	W. Illinois	3.42	Brandon Clarke	Gonzaga	.687	Derrik Jamerson	Norfolk St.	.497	Gavin Peppers	Nicholls	.924
Kylor Kelley	Oregon St.	3.35	Zion Williamson	Duke	.680	Justin Jaworski	Lafayette	.489	Davide Moretti	Texas Tech	.922
Brandon Clarke	Gonzaga	3.16	Jehyve Floyd	Holy Cross	.669	Darnell Edge	Fairleigh Dickinson	.477	Deishuan Booker	Long Beach St.	.912
Osasumwen Osaghae	FIU	3.10	Obi Toppin	Dayton	.666	Nathan Hoover	Wofford	.469	Kyle Leufroy	Lehigh	.910
Jare'l Spellman	Sacred Heart	3.09	Daniel Gafford	Arkansas	.660	Justin Ravenal	Florida A&M	.464	Fletcher Magee	Wofford	.910

== Postseason ==
=== NCAA tournament ===
==== Tournament upsets ====
For this list, an "upset" is defined as a win by a team seeded 7 or more spots below its defeated opponent.

Date	Winner	Score	Loser	Region	Round
March 21	Murray State (#12)	83–64	Marquette (#5)	West	First Round
March 22	UC Irvine (#13)	70–64	Kansas State (#4)	South	First Round
March 22	Oregon (#12)	72–54	Wisconsin (#5)	South	First Round
March 22	Liberty (#12)	80–76	Mississippi State (#5)	East	First Round

== Conference standings ==
2018–19 American Athletic Conference men's basketball standings
	Conf.				Overall
Team	W		L	PCT	W		L	PCT
No. 11 Houston	16	–	2	.889	33	–	4	.892
No. 22 Cincinnati †	14	–	4	.778	28	–	7	.800
Temple	13	–	5	.722	23	–	10	.697
UCF	13	–	5	.722	24	–	9	.727
Memphis	11	–	7	.611	22	–	14	.611
Wichita State	10	–	8	.556	22	–	15	.595
Tulsa	8	–	10	.444	18	–	14	.563
South Florida	8	–	10	.444	24	–	14	.632
UConn	6	–	12	.333	16	–	17	.485
SMU	6	–	12	.333	15	–	17	.469
East Carolina	3	–	15	.167	10	–	21	.323
Tulane	0	–	18	.000	4	–	27	.129
† 2019 AAC tournament winner Rankings from AP poll

2018–19 America East Conference men's basketball standings
	Conf.				Overall
Team	W		L	PCT	W		L	PCT
Vermont †	14	–	2	.875	27	–	7	.794
Stony Brook	12	–	4	.750	24	–	9	.727
UMBC	11	–	5	.688	21	–	13	.618
Hartford	10	–	6	.625	18	–	15	.545
UMass Lowell	7	–	9	.438	15	–	17	.469
Albany	7	–	9	.438	12	–	20	.375
Binghamton	5	–	11	.313	10	–	23	.303
Maine	3	–	13	.188	5	–	27	.156
New Hampshire	3	–	13	.188	5	–	24	.172
† 2019 America East tournament winner

2018–19 Atlantic 10 men's basketball standings
	Conf.				Overall
Team	W		L	PCT	W		L	PCT
VCU	16	–	2	.889	25	–	8	.758
Davidson	14	–	4	.778	24	–	10	.706
Dayton	13	–	5	.722	21	–	12	.636
St. Bonaventure	12	–	6	.667	18	–	16	.529
George Mason	11	–	7	.611	18	–	15	.545
Saint Louis †	10	–	8	.556	23	–	13	.639
Duquesne	10	–	8	.556	19	–	13	.594
Rhode Island	9	–	9	.500	18	–	15	.545
La Salle	8	–	10	.444	10	–	21	.323
Saint Joseph's	6	–	12	.333	14	–	19	.424
Richmond	6	–	12	.333	13	–	20	.394
George Washington	4	–	14	.222	9	–	24	.273
Massachusetts	4	–	14	.222	11	–	21	.344
Fordham	3	–	15	.167	12	–	20	.375
† 2019 Atlantic 10 tournament winner

2018–19 ASUN men's basketball standings
	Conf.				Overall
Team	W		L	PCT	W		L	PCT
Liberty †	14	–	2	.875	29	–	7	.806
Lipscomb	14	–	2	.875	29	–	8	.784
North Florida	9	–	7	.563	16	–	17	.485
Florida Gulf Coast	9	–	7	.563	14	–	18	.438
NJIT	8	–	8	.500	22	–	13	.629
North Alabama	7	–	9	.438	10	–	22	.313
Jacksonville	5	–	11	.313	12	–	20	.375
Kennesaw State	3	–	13	.188	6	–	26	.188
Stetson	3	–	13	.188	7	–	24	.226
† 2019 ASUN tournament winner

2018–19 ACC men's basketball standings
	Conf.				Overall
Team	W		L	PCT	W		L	PCT
No. 2 Virginia	16	–	2	.889	35	–	3	.921
No. 3 North Carolina	16	–	2	.889	29	–	7	.806
No. 1 Duke †	14	–	4	.778	32	–	6	.842
No. 10 Florida State	13	–	5	.722	29	–	8	.784
No. 16 Virginia Tech	12	–	6	.667	26	–	9	.743
Syracuse	10	–	8	.556	20	–	14	.588
Louisville	10	–	8	.556	20	–	14	.588
NC State	9	–	9	.500	24	–	12	.667
Clemson	9	–	9	.500	20	–	14	.588
Georgia Tech	6	–	12	.333	14	–	18	.438
Boston College	5	–	13	.278	14	–	17	.452
Miami (FL)	5	–	13	.278	14	–	18	.438
Wake Forest	4	–	14	.222	11	–	20	.355
Pittsburgh	3	–	15	.167	14	–	19	.424
Notre Dame	3	–	15	.167	14	–	19	.424
† 2019 ACC tournament winner Rankings from AP poll

2018–19 Big East men's basketball standings
	Conf.				Overall
Team	W		L	PCT	W		L	PCT
No. 23 Villanova †	13	–	5	.722	26	–	10	.722
Marquette	12	–	6	.667	24	–	10	.706
Seton Hall	9	–	9	.500	20	–	14	.588
Xavier	9	–	9	.500	19	–	16	.543
Creighton	9	–	9	.500	20	–	15	.571
Georgetown	9	–	9	.500	19	–	14	.576
St. John's	8	–	10	.444	21	–	13	.618
Providence	7	–	11	.389	18	–	16	.529
Butler	7	–	11	.389	16	–	17	.485
DePaul	7	–	11	.389	19	–	17	.528
† 2019 Big East tournament winner Rankings from AP Poll

2018–19 Big Sky men's basketball standings
	Conf.				Overall
Team	W		L	PCT	W		L	PCT
Montana †	16	–	4	.800	26	–	9	.743
Northern Colorado	15	–	5	.750	21	–	11	.656
Eastern Washington	12	–	8	.600	16	–	18	.471
Weber State	11	–	9	.550	18	–	15	.545
Portland State	11	–	9	.550	16	–	16	.500
Montana State	11	–	9	.550	15	–	17	.469
Southern Utah	9	–	11	.450	17	–	17	.500
Northern Arizona	8	–	12	.400	10	–	21	.323
Sacramento State	8	–	12	.400	15	–	16	.484
Idaho State	7	–	13	.350	11	–	19	.367
Idaho	2	–	18	.100	5	–	27	.156
† Conference tournament winner

2018–19 Big South men's basketball standings
	Conf.				Overall
Team	W		L	PCT	W		L	PCT
Campbell	12	–	4	.750	20	–	13	.606
Radford	12	–	4	.750	22	–	11	.667
Winthrop	10	–	6	.625	18	–	12	.600
Gardner–Webb †	10	–	6	.625	23	–	12	.657
High Point	9	–	7	.563	16	–	15	.516
Charleston Southern	9	–	7	.563	18	–	16	.529
Presbyterian	9	–	7	.563	20	–	16	.556
Hampton	9	–	7	.563	18	–	17	.514
Longwood	5	–	11	.313	16	–	18	.471
UNC Asheville	2	–	14	.125	4	–	27	.129
USC Upstate	1	–	15	.063	6	–	26	.188
† 2019 Big South tournament winner

2018–19 Big Ten Conference men's basketball standings
	Conf.				Overall
Team	W		L	PCT	W		L	PCT
No. 5 Michigan State †	16	–	4	.800	32	–	7	.821
No. 13 Purdue	16	–	4	.800	26	–	10	.722
No. 8 Michigan	15	–	5	.750	30	–	7	.811
No. 21 Wisconsin	14	–	6	.700	23	–	11	.676
Maryland	13	–	7	.650	23	–	11	.676
Iowa	10	–	10	.500	23	–	12	.657
Minnesota	9	–	11	.450	22	–	14	.611
Ohio State	8	–	12	.400	20	–	15	.571
Indiana	8	–	12	.400	19	–	16	.543
Penn State	7	–	13	.350	14	–	18	.438
Illinois	7	–	13	.350	12	–	21	.364
Rutgers	7	–	13	.350	14	–	17	.452
Nebraska	6	–	14	.300	19	–	17	.528
Northwestern	4	–	16	.200	13	–	19	.406
† 2019 Big Ten tournament winner Rankings from AP poll

2018–19 Big West men's basketball standings
	Conf.				Overall
Team	W		L	PCT	W		L	PCT
UC Irvine †	15	–	1	.938	31	–	6	.838
UC Santa Barbara	10	–	6	.625	22	–	10	.688
Cal State Fullerton	10	–	6	.625	16	–	18	.471
Hawai'i	9	–	7	.563	18	–	13	.581
Long Beach State	8	–	8	.500	15	–	19	.441
UC Davis	7	–	9	.438	11	–	20	.355
Cal State Northridge	7	–	9	.438	13	–	21	.382
UC Riverside	4	–	12	.250	10	–	23	.303
Cal Poly	2	–	14	.125	6	–	23	.207
† 2019 Big West tournament winner

2018–19 Big 12 men's basketball standings
	Conf.				Overall
Team	W		L	PCT	W		L	PCT
No. 19 Kansas State	14	–	4	.778	25	–	9	.735
No. 2 Texas Tech	14	–	4	.778	31	–	7	.816
No. 16 Kansas	12	–	6	.667	26	–	10	.722
Baylor	10	–	8	.556	20	–	14	.588
No. 25 Iowa State †	9	–	9	.500	23	–	12	.657
Texas	8	–	10	.444	21	–	16	.568
Oklahoma	7	–	11	.389	20	–	14	.588
TCU	7	–	11	.389	23	–	14	.622
Oklahoma State	5	–	13	.278	12	–	20	.375
West Virginia	4	–	14	.222	15	–	21	.417
† 2019 Big 12 tournament winner Rankings from AP Poll

2018–19 CAA men's basketball standings
	Conf.				Overall
Team	W		L	PCT	W		L	PCT
Hofstra	15	–	3	.833	27	–	8	.771
Northeastern †	14	–	4	.778	23	–	11	.676
Charleston	12	–	6	.667	24	–	9	.727
William & Mary	10	–	8	.556	14	–	17	.452
Delaware	8	–	10	.444	17	–	16	.515
Drexel	7	–	11	.389	13	–	19	.406
Elon	7	–	11	.389	11	–	21	.344
James Madison	6	–	12	.333	14	–	19	.424
Towson	6	–	12	.333	10	–	22	.313
UNC Wilmington	5	–	13	.278	10	–	23	.303
† 2019 CAA tournament winner

2018–19 Conference USA men's basketball standings
	Conf.				Overall
Team	W		L	PCT	W		L	PCT
Old Dominion †	13	–	5	.722	26	–	9	.743
Western Kentucky	11	–	7	.611	20	–	14	.588
Southern Miss	11	–	7	.611	20	–	13	.606
UTSA	11	–	7	.611	17	–	15	.531
UAB	10	–	8	.556	20	–	15	.571
Marshall	11	–	7	.611	23	–	14	.622
FIU	10	–	8	.556	20	–	13	.606
Louisiana Tech	9	–	9	.500	20	–	13	.606
Florida Atlantic	8	–	10	.444	17	–	16	.515
North Texas	8	–	10	.444	21	–	12	.636
Rice	8	–	10	.444	13	–	19	.406
Middle Tennessee	8	–	10	.444	11	–	21	.344
Charlotte	5	–	13	.278	8	–	21	.276
UTEP	3	–	15	.167	8	–	21	.276
† 2019 C-USA tournament winner

2018–19 Horizon League men's basketball standings
	Conf.				Overall
Team	W		L	PCT	W		L	PCT
Wright State	13	–	5	.722	21	–	14	.600
Northern Kentucky †	13	–	5	.722	26	–	9	.743
Oakland	11	–	7	.611	16	–	17	.485
Green Bay	10	–	8	.556	21	–	17	.553
UIC	10	–	8	.556	16	–	16	.500
Youngstown State	8	–	10	.444	12	–	20	.375
Detroit Mercy	8	–	10	.444	11	–	20	.355
IUPUI	8	–	10	.444	16	–	17	.485
Cleveland State	5	–	13	.278	10	–	21	.323
Milwaukee	4	–	14	.222	9	–	22	.290
† 2019 Horizon League tournament winner

2018–19 Ivy League men's basketball standings
	Conf.				Overall
Team	W		L	PCT	W		L	PCT
x-Harvard	10	–	4	.714	19	–	12	.613
x-Yale †	10	–	4	.714	22	–	8	.733
Princeton	8	–	6	.571	16	–	12	.571
Penn	7	–	7	.500	19	–	12	.613
Cornell	7	–	7	.500	15	–	16	.484
Brown	7	–	7	.500	20	–	12	.625
Columbia	5	–	9	.357	10	–	18	.357
Dartmouth	2	–	12	.143	11	–	19	.367
† 2019 Ivy League tournament winner x - Ivy League co-champions

2018–19 Mid-American Conference men's basketball standings
	Conf.				Overall
Team	W		L	PCT	W		L	PCT
East
No. 15 Buffalo †	16	–	2	.889	32	–	4	.889
Bowling Green	12	–	6	.667	22	–	12	.647
Kent State	11	–	7	.611	22	–	11	.667
Akron	8	–	10	.444	17	–	16	.515
Miami (OH)	7	–	11	.389	15	–	17	.469
Ohio	6	–	12	.333	14	–	17	.452
West
Toledo	13	–	5	.722	25	–	8	.758
Central Michigan	10	–	8	.556	23	–	12	.657
Eastern Michigan	9	–	9	.500	15	–	17	.469
Northern Illinois	8	–	10	.444	17	–	17	.500
Ball State	6	–	12	.333	16	–	17	.485
Western Michigan	2	–	16	.111	8	–	24	.250
† 2019 MAC tournament winner Rankings from AP Poll

2018–19 MAAC men's basketball standings
	Conf.				Overall
Team	W		L	PCT	W		L	PCT
Iona †	12	–	6	.667	17	–	16	.515
Canisius	11	–	7	.611	15	–	17	.469
Quinnipiac	11	–	7	.611	16	–	15	.516
Rider	11	–	7	.611	16	–	15	.516
Siena	11	–	7	.611	17	–	16	.515
Monmouth	10	–	8	.556	14	–	21	.400
Manhattan	8	–	10	.444	11	–	21	.344
Marist	7	–	11	.389	12	–	19	.387
Saint Peter's	6	–	12	.333	10	–	22	.313
Fairfield	6	–	12	.333	9	–	22	.290
Niagara	6	–	12	.333	13	–	19	.406
† 2019 MAAC tournament winner

2018–19 MEAC men's basketball standings
	Conf.				Overall
Team	W		L	PCT	W		L	PCT
Norfolk State	14	–	2	.875	22	–	14	.611
North Carolina A&T	13	–	3	.813	19	–	13	.594
North Carolina Central †	10	–	6	.625	18	–	16	.529
Howard	10	–	6	.625	17	–	17	.500
Bethune–Cookman	9	–	7	.563	14	–	17	.452
Florida A&M*	9	–	7	.563	12	–	19	.387
Savannah State	8	–	8	.500	11	–	20	.355
Coppin State	7	–	9	.438	8	–	25	.242
MD Eastern Shore	5	–	11	.313	7	–	25	.219
South Carolina State	5	–	11	.313	8	–	26	.235
Morgan State	4	–	12	.250	9	–	21	.300
Delaware State	2	–	14	.125	6	–	25	.194
† 2019 MEAC tournament winner *ineligible for postseason due to APR violations

2018–19 Missouri Valley Conference men's basketball standings
	Conf.				Overall
Team	W		L	PCT	W		L	PCT
Loyola Chicago	12	–	6	.667	20	–	14	.588
Drake	12	–	6	.667	24	–	10	.706
Southern Illinois	10	–	8	.556	17	–	15	.531
Missouri State	10	–	8	.556	16	–	16	.500
Bradley †	9	–	9	.500	20	–	15	.571
Northern Iowa	9	–	9	.500	16	–	18	.471
Illinois State	9	–	9	.500	17	–	16	.515
Indiana State	7	–	11	.389	15	–	16	.484
Valparaiso	7	–	11	.389	15	–	18	.455
Evansville	5	–	13	.278	11	–	21	.344
† 2019 MVC tournament winner

2018–19 Mountain West Conference men's basketball standings
	Conf.				Overall
Team	W		L	PCT	W		L	PCT
No. 20 Nevada	15	–	3	.833	29	–	5	.853
No. 25 Utah State †	15	–	3	.833	28	–	7	.800
Fresno State	13	–	5	.722	23	–	9	.719
San Diego State	11	–	7	.611	21	–	13	.618
UNLV	11	–	7	.611	17	–	14	.548
Air Force	8	–	10	.444	14	–	18	.438
New Mexico	7	–	11	.389	14	–	18	.438
Boise State	7	–	11	.389	13	–	20	.394
Colorado State	7	–	11	.389	12	–	20	.375
Wyoming	4	–	14	.222	8	–	24	.250
San Jose State	1	–	17	.056	4	–	27	.129
† Mountain West Conference tournament winner Rankings from AP Poll

2018–19 Northeast Conference men's basketball standings
	Conf.				Overall
Team	W		L	PCT	W		L	PCT
Saint Francis (PA)	12	–	6	.667	18	–	15	.545
Fairleigh Dickinson †	12	–	6	.667	21	–	14	.600
Sacred Heart	11	–	7	.611	15	–	17	.469
Robert Morris	11	–	7	.611	18	–	17	.514
St. Francis Brooklyn	9	–	9	.500	17	–	16	.515
LIU Brooklyn	9	–	9	.500	16	–	16	.500
Wagner	8	–	10	.444	13	–	17	.433
Bryant	7	–	11	.389	10	–	20	.333
Mount St. Mary's	6	–	12	.333	9	–	22	.290
Central Connecticut	5	–	13	.278	11	–	20	.355
† 2019 NEC tournament winner

2018–19 Ohio Valley Conference men's basketball standings
	Conf.				Overall
Team	W		L	PCT	W		L	PCT
Belmont	16	–	2	.889	27	–	6	.818
Murray State†	16	–	2	.889	28	–	5	.848
Jacksonville State	15	–	3	.833	24	–	9	.727
Austin Peay	13	–	5	.722	22	–	11	.667
Morehead State	8	–	10	.444	13	–	20	.394
Eastern Illinois	7	–	11	.389	14	–	18	.438
UT Martin	6	–	12	.333	12	–	19	.387
SIU Edwardsville	6	–	12	.333	10	–	21	.323
Eastern Kentucky	6	–	12	.333	13	–	18	.419
Tennessee State	6	–	12	.333	9	–	21	.300
Southeast Missouri State	5	–	13	.278	10	–	21	.323
Tennessee Tech	4	–	14	.222	8	–	23	.258
† 2019 OVC tournament winner

2018–19 Pac-12 Conference men's basketball standings
	Conf.				Overall
Team	W		L	PCT	W		L	PCT
Washington	15	–	3	.833	27	–	9	.750
Arizona State	12	–	6	.667	23	–	11	.676
Utah	11	–	7	.611	17	–	14	.548
Oregon State	10	–	8	.556	18	–	13	.581
Colorado	10	–	8	.556	23	–	13	.639
Oregon †	10	–	8	.556	25	–	13	.658
UCLA	9	–	9	.500	17	–	16	.515
USC	8	–	10	.444	16	–	17	.485
Arizona	8	–	10	.444	17	–	15	.531
Stanford	8	–	10	.444	15	–	16	.484
Washington State	4	–	14	.222	11	–	21	.344
California	3	–	15	.167	8	–	23	.258
† Pac-12 Conference tournament winner

2018–19 Patriot League men's basketball standings
	Conf.				Overall
Team	W		L	PCT	W		L	PCT
Colgate †	13	–	5	.722	24	–	11	.686
Bucknell	13	–	5	.722	21	–	12	.636
Lehigh	12	–	6	.667	20	–	11	.645
American	9	–	9	.500	15	–	15	.500
Navy	8	–	10	.444	12	–	19	.387
Army	8	–	10	.444	13	–	19	.406
Lafayette	7	–	11	.389	10	–	20	.333
Boston University	7	–	11	.389	15	–	18	.455
Loyola (MD)	7	–	11	.389	11	–	21	.344
Holy Cross	6	–	12	.333	16	–	17	.485
† 2019 Patriot League tournament winner

2018–19 Southern Conference men's basketball standings
	Conf.				Overall
Team	W		L	PCT	W		L	PCT
No. 19 Wofford †	18	–	0	1.000	30	–	5	.857
UNC Greensboro	15	–	3	.833	29	–	7	.806
Furman	13	–	5	.722	25	–	8	.758
East Tennessee State	13	–	5	.722	24	–	10	.706
Chattanooga	7	–	11	.389	12	–	20	.375
Mercer	6	–	12	.333	11	–	20	.355
Samford	6	–	12	.333	17	–	16	.515
VMI	4	–	14	.222	11	–	21	.344
Western Carolina	4	–	14	.222	7	–	25	.219
The Citadel	4	–	14	.222	12	–	18	.400
† 2019 SoCon tournament winner Rankings from AP poll

2018–19 Southland Conference men's basketball standings
	Conf.				Overall
Team	W		L	PCT	W		L	PCT
Sam Houston State	16	–	2	.889	21	–	12	.636
Abilene Christian †	14	–	4	.778	27	–	7	.794
Southeastern Louisiana	12	–	6	.667	17	–	16	.515
New Orleans	12	–	6	.667	19	–	14	.576
Lamar	12	–	6	.667	20	–	13	.606
Texas A&M–CC	9	–	9	.500	14	–	18	.438
Central Arkansas	8	–	10	.444	14	–	19	.424
Houston Baptist	8	–	10	.444	12	–	18	.400
Stephen F. Austin	7	–	11	.389	14	–	16	.467
Nicholls	7	–	11	.389	14	–	17	.452
Northwestern State	6	–	12	.333	11	–	20	.355
McNeese State	5	–	13	.278	9	–	22	.290
Incarnate Word	1	–	17	.056	6	–	25	.194
† 2019 Southland tournament winner

2018–19 Southeastern Conference men's basketball standings
	Conf.				Overall
Team	W		L	PCT	W		L	PCT
No. 15 LSU	16	–	2	.889	28	–	7	.800
No. 10 Tennessee	15	–	3	.833	31	–	6	.838
No. 7 Kentucky	15	–	3	.833	30	–	7	.811
No. 5 Auburn†	11	–	7	.611	30	–	10	.750
South Carolina	11	–	7	.611	16	–	16	.500
Mississippi State	10	–	8	.556	23	–	11	.676
Ole Miss	10	–	8	.556	20	–	13	.606
Florida	9	–	9	.500	20	–	16	.556
Alabama	8	–	10	.444	18	–	16	.529
Arkansas	8	–	10	.444	18	–	16	.529
Texas A&M	6	–	12	.333	14	–	18	.438
Missouri	5	–	13	.278	15	–	17	.469
Georgia	2	–	16	.111	11	–	21	.344
Vanderbilt	0	–	18	.000	9	–	23	.281
† 2019 SEC tournament winner Rankings from AP Poll

2018–19 SWAC men's basketball standings
	Conf.				Overall
Team	W		L	PCT	W		L	PCT
Prairie View A&M †	17	–	1	.944	22	–	13	.629
Texas Southern	14	–	4	.778	24	–	14	.632
Jackson State	10	–	8	.556	13	–	19	.406
Grambling State	10	–	8	.556	17	–	17	.500
Arkansas–Pine Bluff	10	–	8	.556	13	–	19	.406
Alabama State	9	–	9	.500	12	–	19	.387
Southern	6	–	12	.333	7	–	25	.219
Alcorn State	6	–	12	.333	10	–	21	.323
Mississippi Valley State	4	–	14	.222	6	–	26	.188
Alabama A&M*	4	–	14	.222	5	–	27	.156
† 2019 SWAC tournament winner *ineligible for postseason due to APR violations

2018–19 Summit League men's basketball standings
	Conf.				Overall
Team	W		L	PCT	W		L	PCT
South Dakota State	14	–	2	.875	24	–	9	.727
Omaha	13	–	3	.813	21	–	11	.656
Purdue Fort Wayne	9	–	7	.563	18	–	15	.545
North Dakota State †	9	–	7	.563	19	–	16	.543
Oral Roberts	7	–	9	.438	11	–	21	.344
South Dakota	7	–	9	.438	13	–	17	.433
North Dakota	6	–	10	.375	12	–	18	.400
Western Illinois	4	–	12	.250	10	–	21	.323
Denver	3	–	13	.188	8	–	22	.267
† 2019 Summit League tournament winner

2018–19 Sun Belt Conference men's basketball standings
	Conf.				Overall
Team	W		L	PCT	W		L	PCT
Georgia State †	13	–	5	.722	24	–	10	.706
UT Arlington	12	–	6	.667	17	–	16	.515
Georgia Southern	12	–	6	.667	21	–	12	.636
Texas State	12	–	6	.667	24	–	10	.706
Louisiana	10	–	8	.556	19	–	13	.594
Coastal Carolina	9	–	9	.500	17	–	17	.500
Louisiana–Monroe	9	–	9	.500	19	–	16	.543
South Alabama	8	–	10	.444	17	–	17	.500
Arkansas State	7	–	11	.389	13	–	19	.406
Appalachian State	6	–	12	.333	11	–	21	.344
Little Rock	5	–	13	.278	10	–	21	.323
Troy	5	–	13	.278	12	–	18	.400
† 2019 Sun Belt Conference tournament winner

2018–19 West Coast Conference men's basketball standings
	Conf.				Overall
Team	W		L	PCT	W		L	PCT
No. 4 Gonzaga	16	–	0	1.000	33	–	4	.892
Saint Mary's †	11	–	5	.688	22	–	12	.647
BYU	11	–	5	.688	19	–	13	.594
San Francisco	9	–	7	.563	21	–	10	.677
Loyola Marymount	8	–	8	.500	22	–	12	.647
Santa Clara	8	–	8	.500	16	–	15	.516
San Diego	7	–	9	.438	21	–	15	.583
Pepperdine	6	–	10	.375	16	–	18	.471
Pacific	4	–	12	.250	14	–	18	.438
Portland	0	–	16	.000	7	–	25	.219
† 2019 WCC tournament winner Rankings from AP Poll

2018–19 WAC men's basketball standings
	Conf.				Overall
Team	W		L	PCT	W		L	PCT
New Mexico State †	15	–	1	.938	30	–	5	.857
Utah Valley	12	–	4	.750	25	–	10	.714
Grand Canyon	10	–	6	.625	20	–	14	.588
Texas–Rio Grande Valley	9	–	7	.563	20	–	17	.541
California Baptist *	7	–	9	.438	16	–	15	.516
Cal State Bakersfield	7	–	9	.438	18	–	16	.529
Seattle	6	–	10	.375	18	–	15	.545
UMKC	6	–	10	.375	11	–	21	.344
Chicago State	0	–	16	.000	3	–	29	.094
† 2019 WAC tournament winner * Ineligible for WAC tournament (reclassification from NCAA Division II)

== Award winners ==
=== 2019 Consensus All-America team ===
Consensus First Team
Player	Position	Class	Team
RJ Barrett	SG	Freshman	Duke
Rui Hachimura	SF/PF	Junior	Gonzaga
Ja Morant	PG	Sophomore	Murray State
Grant Williams	PF	Junior	Tennessee
Zion Williamson	SF/PF	Freshman	Duke

Consensus Second Team
Player	Position	Class	Team
Jarrett Culver	SG	Sophomore	Texas Tech
Carsen Edwards	PG/SG	Junior	Purdue
Ethan Happ	PF	Senior	Wisconsin
Markus Howard	PG	Junior	Marquette
Cassius Winston	PG	Junior	Michigan State

=== Major player of the year awards ===
- Wooden Award: Zion Williamson, Duke
- Naismith Award: Zion Williamson, Duke
- Associated Press Player of the Year: Zion Williamson, Duke
- NABC Player of the Year: Zion Williamson, Duke
- Oscar Robertson Trophy (USBWA): Zion Williamson, Duke
- Sporting News Player of the Year: Zion Williamson, Duke

=== Major freshman of the year awards ===
- Wayman Tisdale Award (USBWA): Zion Williamson, Duke
- NABC Freshman of the Year: Zion Williamson, Duke
- Sporting News Freshman of the Year: Zion Williamson, Duke

=== Major coach of the year awards ===
- Associated Press Coach of the Year: Chris Beard, Texas Tech
- Henry Iba Award (USBWA): Rick Barnes, Tennessee
- NABC Coach of the Year: Matt Painter, Purdue
- Naismith College Coach of the Year: Rick Barnes, Tennessee
- Sporting News Coach of the Year: Mike Young, Wofford

=== Other major awards ===
- Bob Cousy Award (Best point guard): Ja Morant, Murray State
- Jerry West Award (Best shooting guard): RJ Barrett, Duke
- Julius Erving Award (Best small forward): Rui Hachimura, Gonzaga
- Karl Malone Award (Best power forward): Zion Williamson, Duke
- Kareem Abdul-Jabbar Award (Best center): Ethan Happ, Wisconsin
- Pete Newell Big Man Award (Best big man): Ethan Happ, Wisconsin
- NABC Defensive Player of the Year: De'Andre Hunter, Virginia
- Naismith Defensive Player of the Year: Matisse Thybulle, Washington
- Senior CLASS Award (top senior on and off the court): Luke Maye, North Carolina
- Robert V. Geasey Trophy (Top player in Philadelphia Big 5): Phil Booth, Villanova
- Haggerty Award (Top player in New York City metro area): Myles Powell, Seton Hall
- Ben Jobe Award (Top minority coach): James Jones, Yale
- Hugh Durham Award (Top mid-major coach): Darian DeVries, Drake
- Jim Phelan Award (Top head coach): Ritchie McKay, Liberty
- Lefty Driesell Award (Top defensive player): Matisse Thybulle, Washington
- Lou Henson Award (Top mid-major player): Fletcher Magee, Wofford
- Lute Olson Award (Top non-freshman or transfer player): Ja Morant, Murray State
- Skip Prosser Man of the Year Award (Coach with moral character): Robert Jones, Norfolk State
- Academic All-American of the Year (Top scholar-athlete): Joe Sherburne, UMBC
- Elite 90 Award (Top GPA among upperclass players at Final Four): Davide Moretti, Texas Tech
- USBWA Most Courageous Award: The 2019 men's award was not presented to a figure involved with the Division I game. This year's recipient was involved with the NCAA Division II game—namely Ericka Downey, wife of Northeastern State men's head coach Mike Downey.

== Coaching changes ==
Several teams changed coaches during and after the season.

Team	Former coach	Interim coach	New coach	Reason
Alabama	Avery Johnson		Nate Oats	Johnson and Alabama mutually agreed to part ways on March 24 after 4 seasons, in which the Crimson Tide went 75–62 overall but only made the NCAA tournament once. Alabama filled the opening three days later, hiring Buffalo head coach Oats.
Appalachian State	Jim Fox		Dustin Kerns	Fox was fired on March 15 after 5 seasons and a 56–99 overall record at Appalachian State. On March 28, the Mountaineers hired Presbyterian head coach Kerns for the position.
Arkansas	Mike Anderson		Eric Musselman	Arkansas parted ways with Anderson on March 26 after 8 seasons, in which the Razorbacks went 169–102 overall, but Arkansas's AD cited lack of consistent success in the SEC and NCAA as the reasons for Anderson's dismissal. Nevada head coach Musselman was hired by Arkansas on April 7.
Belmont	Rick Byrd		Casey Alexander	The 65-year-old Byrd announced his retirement on April 1 after 33 seasons at Belmont and 38 overall as head coach. Byrd led the Bruins to many accomplishments including winning the 1989 NAIA championship, 8 NCAA tournament appearances, and leaves Belmont as the winningest head coach with 713 wins. Casey Alexander, a former Belmont player and Byrd assistant and head coach of crosstown rival Lipscomb for the past 6 seasons, was hired on April 10.
Buffalo	Nate Oats		Jim Whitesell	Oats left on March 27 to replace Avery Johnson as the Alabama head coach. Oats left Buffalo with a 97–43 record over four years, four winning seasons, and back-to-back tournament appearances, both of which included a victory in the Round of 64. Bulls associate head coach Whitesell was promoted to head coach on April 6.
BYU	Dave Rose		Mark Pope	The 61-year-old Rose announced his retirement on March 26 after 14 seasons at BYU. Under Rose, the Cougars won 348 games overall (pending the school's appeal of an NCAA rules violation in November), but this season was the first in Rose's tenure in which the team did not play in any postseason tournaments. On April 10, Utah Valley head coach and former BYU assistant Pope was hired for the head coaching position.
Cal Poly	Joe Callero		John Smith	Callero was fired on March 6, effective at the end of the season. At the time of his firing near the end of his 10th season at Cal Poly, he had a record of 126–182, and the Mustangs were 6–21 overall and 2–12 in Big West play, long since assured of their sixth straight losing season. Additionally, the Mustangs were assured of their worst overall record in nearly 25 years. On March 28, the school hired Cal State Fullerton assistant coach Smith for the job.
California	Wyking Jones		Mark Fox	Jones was fired on March 24 after two seasons in Berkeley, during which the Golden Bears went 16–47 overall and 5–31 in the Pac-12. Former Georgia and Nevada head coach Fox was hired on March 29.
Cincinnati	Mick Cronin		John Brannen	Cronin left his alma mater on April 9 after 13 seasons to accept the UCLA head coaching job. The Bearcats stayed local for Cronin's replacement, hiring Brannen away from nearby Northern Kentucky on April 14.
Cleveland State	Dennis Felton		Dennis Gates	Cleveland State fired Felton on July 12 after 2 seasons and a 22–44 overall record. The Vikings hired Florida State assistant Gates for the job on July 26.
Elon	Matt Matheny		Mike Schrage	Matheny was fired on March 18 after 10 seasons at Elon. Despite leaving as the program's winningest coach with 151 wins, the Phoenix only made one postseason tournament under Matheny. On April 5, Elon hired Ohio State assistant coach Mike Schrage as their new head coach.
Fairfield	Sydney Johnson		Jay Young	Johnson was fired March 11 after 8 seasons at Fairfield, in which the Stags went 116–147 overall. Rutgers assistant coach Young was named the new head coach of Fairfield on April 3.
George Washington	Maurice Joseph		Jamion Christian	George Washington parted ways with Joseph on March 15 after 3 seasons and an overall record of 44–57. On March 21, the Colonials hired Christian away from Siena to take the job.
Georgia State	Ron Hunter		Rob Lanier	Hunter left Georgia State on March 24 after 8 seasons for the Tulane head coaching job. Tennessee assistant coach and former Siena head coach Lanier was hired by the Panthers as their new head coach on April 5.
Holy Cross	Bill Carmody		Brett Nelson	The 67-year-old Carmody announced his retirement on June 18 after 4 seasons at Holy Cross, and 21 seasons overall as head coach. The Crusaders hired Marquette assistant Nelson as Carmody's successor on July 3.
Howard	Kevin Nickelberry		Kenny Blakeney	Nickelberry stepped down from his head coaching position on March 26 after 9 seasons at Howard, finishing 96–193 overall. The Bison hired Columbia assistant Kenny Blakeney as their new head coach on May 6.
Idaho	Don Verlin	Zac Claus		Verlin, who had been placed on administrative leave by Idaho since late May, was fired on June 14 after 11 seasons following an internal report that revealed potential NCAA violations in the program. Assistant coach Zac Claus was initially named interim head coach of the Vandals for the 2019–20 season, but had the interim tag removed on February 25 and was named full-time head coach of the team.
Idaho State	Bill Evans		Ryan Looney	Evans' 7-year tenure at Idaho State came to an end on March 26 after his contract was not renewed, finishing 70–141 overall. The Bengals went to Division II for their next hire, tapping Point Loma's Ryan Looney, fresh off a loss in the D-II title game, as their next head coach on April 18.
IUPUI	Jason Gardner	Byron Rimm II	Matt Crenshaw	Gardner resigned from IUPUI on August 27, 2019, after 5 seasons following an OWI arrest 2 days earlier. He leaves the school with a 64–93 overall record. Associate head coach Rimm was initially named interim head coach of the Jaguars for the 2019–20 season, but due to the ongoing COVID-19 pandemic, the school announced on June 11, 2020, that they had shut down their coaching search and retained Rimm for the 2020–21 season. On April 13, 2021, Ball State assistant coach and IUPUI alum Matt Crenshaw was hired as the new head coach of the program.
Kennesaw State	Al Skinner		Amir Abdur-Rahim	Skinner announced his resignation from Kennesaw State effective after the season on February 21. The Owls finished 41–84 overall in Skinner's 4-year tenure as head coach. Georgia assistant coach Amir Abdur-Rahim was hired as his replacement on April 18.
Lipscomb	Casey Alexander		Lennie Acuff	Alexander left Lipscomb on April 10 after 6 seasons to accept the head coaching job at his alma mater and Lipscomb's crosstown rival, Belmont. On April 23, the Bisons hired Acuff from the D-II Alabama–Huntsville Chargers as the new head coach.
Mercer	Bob Hoffman		Greg Gary	Hoffman was fired on March 11 after 11 seasons at Mercer. The Bears went 209–165 under Hoffman, but this season, in which the team finished 11–20 overall and 6–12 in the Southern Conference, was the worst season of his tenure. On March 26, the university hired Purdue assistant coach Gary for the head coaching job, officially introducing him after Purdue exited the NCAA tournament.
Michigan	John Beilein		Juwan Howard	Beilein left Michigan on May 13 after 12 seasons to accept the head coaching job with the NBA's Cleveland Cavaliers. Beilein ends his Michigan tenure as the all-time winningest coach in school history with 278 wins. Miami Heat assistant Juwan Howard, a Michigan alum who is best known for his role in the Fab Five during the 1990s, was hired as his replacement on May 22.
Mississippi Valley State	Andre Payne		Lindsey Hunter	MVSU fired Payne on March 25 after 5 seasons, in which the Delta Devils went 31–132 overall and lost at least 25 games in each season of his tenure. The school hired former NBA player Lindsey Hunter as their new head coach on April 20.
Montana State	Brian Fish		Danny Sprinkle	Montana State parted ways with Fish on March 17 after 5 seasons and a 65–92 overall record. Cal State Fullerton assistant and former Bobcat standout player Sprinkle was hired as the new head coach on April 4.
Morgan State	Todd Bozeman		Kevin Broadus	Bozeman's 13-year tenure at Morgan State ended on March 20 when his contract was not renewed. Under Bozeman, the Bears finished 195–218 overall, but this season was the 6th straight in which the team finished with a losing record. Maryland assistant Kevin Broadus, who also served as Binghamton head coach from 2007 to 2009, was hired as his replacement on April 29.
Nebraska	Tim Miles		Fred Hoiberg	Nebraska fired Miles on March 26 after 7 seasons, in which the Cornhuskers went 116–114 overall and made only 1 appearance in the NCAA tournament under his tenure. Former Iowa State and Chicago Bulls head coach Fred Hoiberg was hired as his replacement on March 30.
Nevada	Eric Musselman		Steve Alford	Musselman left Nevada on April 7 after 4 seasons for the Arkansas head coaching job. The school announced on April 11 that it had hired Alford, who had been fired by UCLA at midseason, and formally introduced him as the Wolf Pack's newest head coach the next day.
Niagara	Chris Casey		Patrick Beilein	Niagara fired Casey on March 11 after 6 seasons. Under Casey, the Purple Eagles went 64–129 overall with one winning season. Niagara went to the Division II ranks for its new hire, announcing Le Moyne head coach Patrick Beilein (son of then Michigan head coach John Beilein) as the new coach on March 28. However, the younger Beilein would never coach a game for the Purple Eagles, resigning on October 24, 2019, for undisclosed personal reasons.
North Dakota	Brian Jones		Paul Sather	Jones left North Dakota on May 1 after 13 seasons for the associate head coaching position at Illinois State. The Fighting Hawks hired Sather from Division II Northern State University as their new head coach on May 28.
Northern Arizona	Jack Murphy	Shane Burcar		Murphy left Northern Arizona on June 2 to become the top assistant at his alma mater of Arizona, leaving NAU with a 78–149 record in 7 seasons. The Lumberjacks named assistant Burcar as interim head coach for the 2019–20 season, and had the interim tag removed on March 25.
Northern Kentucky	John Brannen		Darrin Horn	Brannen left NKU on April 14 after 4 seasons for the Cincinnati vacancy. On April 23, former Western Kentucky and South Carolina head coach Darrin Horn was hired away from his assistant coaching position at Texas to become the Norse's new head coach.
Ohio	Saul Phillips		Jeff Boals	Ohio fired Phillips on March 13 after 5 seasons, in which the team went 81–77 overall and 40–50 in Mid-American Conference play. The school then hired Boals, who played for the Bobcats and began his coaching career as an assistant with the team in the 1990s, from Stony Brook on March 17.
Presbyterian	Dustin Kerns		Quinton Ferrell	Kerns left Presbyterian on March 28 after 2 seasons for the head coaching job at Appalachian State. College of Charleston assistant coach and Presbyterian alumnus Quinton Ferrell was hired as his replacement on April 11.
St. John's	Chris Mullin		Mike Anderson	Hall of Fame player and St. John's great Chris Mullin resigned on April 9 after 4 seasons as head coach of his alma mater. Mullin posted records of 59–73 overall and 20–52 in Big East play, though the Red Storm reached the NCAA tournament this past season. Former Arkansas head coach Mike Anderson, who was let go by Arkansas last month after 8 seasons, was hired as the new coach on April 19.
Saint Joseph's	Phil Martelli		Billy Lange	Martelli was fired on March 19 after 34 seasons at Saint Joseph's, the last 24 as head coach. Despite Martelli's 444–328 overall record, the Hawks were unable to break .500 in the last three seasons, finishing this season 14–19 overall and 6–12 in the A-10. On March 28, Saint Joseph's hired Philadelphia 76ers assistant and former Navy head coach Billy Lange.
San Francisco	Kyle Smith		Todd Golden	Smith left San Francisco on March 27 after three seasons to replace Ernie Kent at Washington State. During his tenure, San Francisco went 63–40 with two CBI appearances. The Dons promoted assistant Golden to head coaching position the following day.
Siena	Jamion Christian		Carmen Maciariello	Christian left Siena on March 21 after a single season to take the head coaching job at George Washington. This was the second straight offseason in which Siena made a coaching change, having fired Jimmy Patsos after the 2017–18 season. The Saints promoted assistant coach Maciariello to fill the vacancy on March 26.
SIU Edwardsville	Jon Harris	Brian Barone		Harris's contract with SIUE was not renewed on March 11, ending his 4-year tenure at the school. The Cougars went 31–88 overall during his tenure. On March 26, assistant coach Barone was initially promoted to interim head coach of the Cougars for the 2019–20 season, but had his contract extended on November 13 and named head coach of the team.
South Dakota State	T. J. Otzelberger		Eric Henderson	Otzelberger left after three seasons for the UNLV opening. Assistant coach Henderson was promoted to head coach of the Jackrabbits the following day.
Southeastern Louisiana	Jay Ladner		David Kiefer	Ladner left Southeastern Louisiana on April 17 after 5 seasons to accept the head coaching job at his alma mater, Southern Miss. Ladner's top assistant, David Kiefer, was named as his replacement on July 2.
Southern Illinois	Barry Hinson		Bryan Mullins	Shortly after losing to Northern Iowa in the quarterfinals of the Missouri Valley Conference tournament, Hinson announced his resignation from Southern Illinois on March 8. The Salukis finished 116–106 overall under Hinson, but did not make any postseason tournaments during his 7-year tenure with the team. On March 20, the school hired Loyola-Chicago assistant and former Salukis player Mullins for the head coaching job.
Southern Miss	Doc Sadler		Jay Ladner	Sadler resigned on April 11 after 5 seasons at Southern Miss. Under Sadler, the Golden Eagles went 56–94 overall, but this season was their best under Sadler, in which the team went 20–13 overall and finished tied for 2nd in conference play. The following day, new Nebraska head coach Fred Hoiberg announced he had hired Sadler, a former Cornhuskers head coach who had spent a season on Hoiberg's staff at Iowa State, as an assistant. The school hired Southeastern Louisiana head coach and fellow alumnus Jay Ladner as their new head coach on April 17.
Stetson	Corey Williams		Donnie Jones	Stetson fired Williams on March 6 after 6 seasons and a 58–133 overall record, including a 7–24 overall record and 3–13 in ASUN play this season. On March 29, the Hatters hired Dayton assistant and former UCF/Marshall head coach Donnie Jones.
Stony Brook	Jeff Boals	Geno Ford		Boals left Stony Brook on March 17 after 3 seasons to take the head coaching job at his alma mater of Ohio. Assistant coach Ford served as the interim head coach of the Seawolves in the CBI, and had the interim tag removed on March 26.
Temple	Fran Dunphy		Aaron McKie	Following the 2017–18 season, Temple announced on April 13, 2018, that Dunphy would step down from his head coaching position at the end of the 2018–19 season, with assistant coach and former Owl player McKie succeeding him. In Dunphy's 13-year tenure at Temple, the team won 270 games overall and made the NCAA tournament 8 times. McKie was officially introduced as head coach of the Owls on April 2, 2019.
Tennessee Tech	Steve Payne		John Pelphrey	Tennessee Tech announced on March 3 that Payne had resigned after 17 seasons on the coaching staff and 8 as head coach. Tech had failed to make the NCAA tournament during Payne's head coaching tenure, and his final record as head coach was 118–134. The 2018–19 season saw the Golden Eagles finish last in the OVC, at 4–14 in-conference and 8–23 overall. Alabama assistant Pelphrey, who previously served as head coach at South Alabama and Arkansas, was named Tennessee Tech's new head coach on April 6.
Texas A&M	Billy Kennedy		Buzz Williams	Texas A&M announced on March 12 that Kennedy will not return next season. At the time of the announcement, the Aggies were 150–115 overall under Kennedy's 8-year tenure, but this season, in which the team went 13–17 overall and 6–12 in SEC play, was their worst since joining the conference in 2012. The school hired Virginia Tech head coach Buzz Williams to the same position on April 3.
Troy	Phil Cunningham		Scott Cross	Troy parted ways with Cunningham on March 11 after 6 seasons and an 80–111 overall record. On March 26, the Trojans hired TCU assistant coach and former UT Arlington head coach Cross for the job.
Tulane	Mike Dunleavy		Ron Hunter	After a 24–69 overall record in 3 seasons, including going winless in conference play this season, Tulane parted ways with Dunleavy on March 15. On March 24, the Green Wave hired Georgia State head coach Hunter for the job.
UCLA	Steve Alford	Murry Bartow	Mick Cronin	UCLA fired Alford on December 31. In 5 1/2 seasons at UCLA, Alford was 124–63 along with 3 Sweet 16 trips, but the Bruins were 7–6 on the season and in the midst of a four-game losing streak, capped off by a double-digit home loss to Liberty. Top assistant Murry Bartow, whose father Gene succeeded John Wooden at UCLA, was named interim head coach for the remainder of the season. The school hired Cincinnati's Mick Cronin as their new head coach on April 9.
UMKC	Kareem Richardson		Billy Donlon	UMKC fired Richardson on March 14 after 6 seasons, in which the Kangaroos went 75–118 overall with one winning season. On March 28, Northwestern assistant and former Wright State head coach Donlon was hired to fill the vacancy.
UNLV	Marvin Menzies		T. J. Otzelberger	UNLV parted ways with Menzies on March 15 after 3 seasons and a 48–48 overall record. The Runnin' Rebels hired Otzelberger away from South Dakota State on March 27.
Utah Valley	Mark Pope		Mark Madsen	Pope left Utah Valley on April 10 after 4 seasons for the head coaching job at BYU, where he served as assistant coach prior to taking the Utah Valley job. The school hired Los Angeles Lakers assistant Mark Madsen as his replacement on April 14.
Vanderbilt	Bryce Drew		Jerry Stackhouse	Vanderbilt fired Drew on March 22 after 3 seasons and a 40–59 overall record. After qualifying for the NCAA tournament in 2017, Drew's first season, the Commodores suffered back-to-back losing seasons, including an 0–18 conference record in 2018–19. On April 5, former North Carolina standout and two-time NBA All-Star Stackhouse agreed to become the new head coach for Vanderbilt after being an assistant for the Memphis Grizzlies.
Virginia Tech	Buzz Williams		Mike Young	Williams left Virginia Tech on April 3 after 5 seasons to take the Texas A&M head coaching job. The Hokies hired Wofford head coach Young as his replacement on April 7.
Washington State	Ernie Kent		Kyle Smith	Washington State fired Kent on March 14 after 5 seasons and a 58–98 overall record, with no Pac-12 finish higher than 10th in any of the last four seasons. The Cougars hired San Francisco head coach Smith on March 27.
William & Mary	Tony Shaver		Dane Fischer	Willam & Mary parted ways with Shaver on March 13 after 16 seasons. Shaver leaves as the program's winningest coach with 226 wins, but the Tribe were never able to make their first NCAA tournament under his tenure. On April 2, the Tribe hired George Mason assistant Fischer to replace him.
Wofford	Mike Young		Jay McAuley	Young left Wofford on April 7 after 17 seasons to accept the Virginia Tech job. The Terriers promoted their top assistant McAuley to head coach on April 14.

== Attendances ==
The top 30 NCAA Division I men's basketball teams by average home attendance:

#	Team	Home games	Total attendance	Average attendance
1	Syracuse	19	417,852	21,992
2	Kentucky	18	390,510	21,695
3	North Carolina	16	315,436	19,715
4	Tennessee	18	342,615	19,034
5	Wisconsin	15	257,546	17,170
6	Louisville	18	298,826	16,601
7	Kansas	17	276,010	16,236
8	Creighton	19	303,629	15,980
9	Marquette	19	296,611	15,611
10	Nebraska	18	276,143	15,341
11	Arkansas	18	275,012	15,278
12	Indiana	21	319,335	15,206
13	Michigan State	16	236,752	14,797
14	Purdue	15	217,005	14,467
15	Iowa State	16	225,578	14,099
16	Virginia	16	225,392	14,087
17	Memphis	21	295,385	14,065
18	Maryland	18	252,155	14,009
19	Ohio State	18	250,595	13,922
20	NC State	22	305,744	13,897
21	Arizona	17	233,645	13,744
22	Dayton	17	220,277	12,957
23	Iowa	18	231,650	12,869
24	Michigan	18	225,093	12,505
25	Illinois	16	199,303	12,456
26	Texas Tech	18	217,771	12,098
27	BYU	16	191,322	11,958
28	South Carolina	17	195,023	11,472
29	Cincinnati	18	202,610	11,256
30	New Mexico	16	177,715	11,107

== See also ==
- 2018–19 NCAA Division I women's basketball season
