= 2019 Missouri Valley Conference men's basketball tournament =

- Classification: Division I
- Season: 2018–19
- Teams: 10
- Site: Enterprise Center; St. Louis, Missouri
- Champions: Bradley (3rd title)
- Winning coach: Brian Wardle (1st title)
- MVP: Elijah Childs (Bradley)
- Television: CBS, CBSSN, MVC TV (ESPN+)

2018–19 Missouri Valley Conference men's basketball standings
	Conf.				Overall
Team	W		L	PCT	W		L	PCT
Loyola Chicago	12	–	6	.667	20	–	14	.588
Drake	12	–	6	.667	24	–	10	.706
Southern Illinois	10	–	8	.556	17	–	15	.531
Missouri State	10	–	8	.556	16	–	16	.500
Bradley †	9	–	9	.500	20	–	15	.571
Northern Iowa	9	–	9	.500	16	–	18	.471
Illinois State	9	–	9	.500	17	–	16	.515
Indiana State	7	–	11	.389	15	–	16	.484
Valparaiso	7	–	11	.389	15	–	18	.455
Evansville	5	–	13	.278	11	–	21	.344
† 2019 MVC tournament winner

The 2019 Missouri Valley Conference men's basketball tournament, popularly referred to as "Arch Madness", was a postseason men's basketball tournament that completed the 2018–19 season in the Missouri Valley Conference. The tournament was held at the Enterprise Center in St. Louis, Missouri from March 7–10, 2019.

No. 5 seed Bradley defeated No. 6-seeded Northern Iowa 57–54 in the championship game to win the tournament, and received the MVC's automatic bid to the NCAA tournament. It was the third overall MVC title for Bradley, the first since 1988.

== Seeds ==
Teams were seeded by conference record, with ties broken by overall record in conference games played between the tied teams, then (if necessary) by NET Rating on the day following the conclusion of the regular season. The top six seeds received opening round byes.

Seed	School	Conference	Tiebreaker 1	Tiebreaker 2
1	Loyola–Chicago	12–6	2–0 vs. Drake	
2	Drake	12–6	0–2 vs. Loyola–Chicago	
3	Southern Illinois	10–8	1–1 vs. Missouri St.	131 NET
4	Missouri State	10–8	1–1 vs. S. Illinois	182 NET
5	Bradley	9–9	3–1 vs. N. Iowa/Illinois St.	
6	Northern Iowa	9–9	2–2 vs. Bradley/Illinois St.	
7	Illinois State	9–9	1–3 vs. Bradley/N. Iowa	
8	Indiana State	7–11	2–0 vs Valparaiso	
9	Valparaiso	7–11	0–2 vs Indiana St.	
10	Evansville	5–13		

== Schedule ==
Game	Time *	Matchup	Score	Television
Opening round – Thursday, March 7
1	6:05 pm	No. 8 Indiana State vs. No. 9 Valparaiso	55–77	MVC TV [ESPN+]
2	8:35 pm	No. 7 Illinois State vs. No. 10 Evansville	65–60	MVC TV [ESPN+]
Quarterfinals – Friday, March 8
3	12:05 pm	No. 1 Loyola–Chicago vs. No. 9 Valparaiso	67–54	MVC TV [ESPN+]
4	2:35 pm	No. 4 Missouri State vs. No. 5 Bradley	58–61	MVC TV [ESPN+]
5	6:05 pm	No. 2 Drake vs. No. 7 Illinois State	78–62	MVC TV [ESPN+]
6	8:35 pm	No. 3 Southern Illinois vs. No. 6 Northern Iowa	58–61	MVC TV [ESPN+]
Semifinals – Saturday, March 9
7	2:35 pm	No. 1 Loyola–Chicago vs. No. 5 Bradley	51–53	CBSSN
8	5:05 pm	No. 2 Drake vs. No. 6 Northern Iowa	58–60	CBSSN
Final – Sunday, March 10
9	1:05 pm	No. 5 Bradley vs. No. 6 Northern Iowa	57–54	CBS
* Game times in CST through semifinals; CDT for championship; rankings denote tournament seed.

== Tournament bracket ==
First round Thursday, March 7 MVC TV/ESPN+
8	Indiana State	55
9	Valparaiso	77
7	Illinois State	65
10	Evansville	60

Quarterfinals; Friday, March 8 MVC TV/ESPN+
1	Loyola–Chicago	67
9	Valparaiso	54
4	Missouri State	58
5	Bradley	61
2	Drake	78
7	Illinois State	62
3	Southern Illinois	58
6	Northern Iowa	61

Semifinals; Saturday, March 9 CBSSN
1	Loyola–Chicago	51
5	Bradley	53
2	Drake	58
6	Northern Iowa	60

Championship; Sunday, March 10; CBS
5	Bradley	57
6	Northern Iowa	54
