= 2018–19 Loyola Ramblers men's basketball team =

American college basketball season

2018–19 Loyola Ramblers men's basketball

Missouri Valley regular season co-champions

NIT, first round
- Conference: Missouri Valley Conference
- Record: 20–14 (12–6 MVC)
- Head coach: Porter Moser (8th season)
- Assistant coaches: Bryan Mullins; Matt Gordon; Drew Valentine
- Home arena: Joseph J. Gentile Arena

2018–19 Missouri Valley Conference men's basketball standings
| | Conf. | | | | Overall |
| Team | W | | L | PCT | W | | L | PCT |
|---|---|---|---|---|---|---|---|---|
| Loyola Chicago | 12 | – | 6 | .667 | 20 | – | 14 | .588 |
| Drake | 12 | – | 6 | .667 | 24 | – | 10 | .706 |
| Southern Illinois | 10 | – | 8 | .556 | 17 | – | 15 | .531 |
| Missouri State | 10 | – | 8 | .556 | 16 | – | 16 | .500 |
| Bradley † | 9 | – | 9 | .500 | 20 | – | 15 | .571 |
| Northern Iowa | 9 | – | 9 | .500 | 16 | – | 18 | .471 |
| Illinois State | 9 | – | 9 | .500 | 17 | – | 16 | .515 |
| Indiana State | 7 | – | 11 | .389 | 15 | – | 16 | .484 |
| Valparaiso | 7 | – | 11 | .389 | 15 | – | 18 | .455 |
| Evansville | 5 | – | 13 | .278 | 11 | – | 21 | .344 |
† 2019 MVC tournament winner

The 2018–19 Loyola Ramblers men's basketball team represented Loyola University Chicago during the 2018–19 NCAA Division I men's basketball season. The Ramblers, led by seventh-year head coach Porter Moser, played their home games at the Joseph J. Gentile Arena in Chicago, Illinois. They were members of the Missouri Valley Conference. They finished the season 20–14, 12–6 in MVC play to earn a share of the MVC regular season championship. As the No. 1 seed in the MVC tournament, they beat Valparaiso before losing to Bradley in the semifinals. As a regular season conference champion who did not win their tournament championship, the Ramblers received an automatic bid to the National Invitation Tournament as the No. 7 seed in the TCU bracket. There they lost in the first round to Creighton.

== Previous season ==
The Ramblers finished the 2017–18 season 32–6, 15–3 in MVC play with a win against Evansville on February 18, 2018, Loyola clinched at least a share of its first-ever Missouri Valley Conference regular season championship. With a win over Southern Illinois on February 21, the Ramblers clinched the outright MVC championship. The Ramblers defeated Northern Iowa, Bradley, and Illinois State to win the MVC tournament. As a result, the Ramblers received the conference's automatic bid to the NCAA tournament. As the No. 11 seed in the South Region, they upset No. 6-seeded Miami (FL) on a last second three-pointer. In the Second Round, they defeated No. 3-seeded Tennessee to earn the school's first trip to the Sweet Sixteen since 1985. They then defeated Nevada in the Sweet Sixteen and Kansas State in the Elite Eight to advance to the Final Four for the first time since 1963. Their Cinderella-story run ended with loss to Michigan in the national semifinal.

== Offseason ==
=== Departures ===
| Name | Number | Pos. | Height | Weight | Year | Hometown | Reason for departure |
|---|---|---|---|---|---|---|---|
| Donte Ingram | 0 | G/F | 6'6" | 215 | Senior | Chicago, IL | Graduated |
| Adarius Avery | 10 | G | 6'5" | 190 | Junior | Arlington, TN | Graduate transferred to Central Oklahoma |
| Ben Richardson | 14 | G | 6'3" | 195 | Senior | Overland Park, KS | Graduated/signed to play professional in Poland with MKS Dąbrowa Górnicza |
| Cameron Satterwhite | 23 | G | 6'4" | 175 | Sophomore | Gilbert, AZ | Transferred to Northern Arizona |
| Aundre Jackson | 24 | F | 6'5" | 230 | Senior | Kennedale, TX | Graduated/signed to play professional in Iceland with Skallagrímur |
| Carson Shanks | 32 | C | 7'0" | 245 | RS Senior | Prior Lake, MN | Graduated |
| Nick Dinardi | 44 | F | 6'7" | 225 | Senior | Palos Park, IL | Walk-on; graduated |

=== Incoming transfers ===
| Name | Number | Pos. | Height | Weight | Year | Hometown | Previous School |
|---|---|---|---|---|---|---|---|
| Tate Hall | 24 | G | 6'6" | 200 | Junior | Greenfield, IN | Transferred from Indianapolis. Under NCAA transfer rules, Hall will have to sit out for the 2018–19 season. Will have two years of remaining eligibility. |

=== 2018 recruiting class ===
College recruiting information
| Name | Hometown | School | Height | Weight | Commit date |
|---|---|---|---|---|---|
| Franklin Aguananne #19 C | Abuja, Nigeria | La Lumiere School | 6 ft 8 in (2.03 m) | 210 lb (95 kg) | Sep 15, 2017 |
| Franklin Aguananne #19 C | Recruit ratings: Scout: Rivals: 247Sports: ESPN: (80) | | | | |
| Cooper Kaifes; SG | Shawnee, KS | Mill Valley High School | 6 ft 3 in (1.91 m) | 190 lb (86 kg) | Nov 15, 2017 |
| Cooper Kaifes; SG | Recruit ratings: Scout: Rivals: 247Sports: ESPN: (NR) | | | | |
| Isaiah Bujdoso; PG | Hamilton, ON | Sunrise Christian Academy | 6 ft 2 in (1.88 m) | 180 lb (82 kg) | Nov 8, 2017 |
| Isaiah Bujdoso; PG | Recruit ratings: Scout: Rivals: 247Sports: ESPN: (NR) | | | | |
Overall recruit ranking: Scout: #93 Rivals: #58 247Sports: #103
Note: In many cases, Scout, Rivals, 247Sports, On3, and ESPN may conflict in their listings of height and weight.; In these cases, the average was taken. ESPN grades are on a 100-point scale.; Sources: "2018 Team Ranking". Rivals.

=== 2019 recruiting class ===
College recruiting information (2019)
| Name | Hometown | School | Height | Weight | Commit date |
|---|---|---|---|---|---|
| Paxson Wojcik; SG | La Lumiere, IN | La Lumiere School | 6 ft 4 in (1.93 m) | 170 lb (77 kg) | Jun 24, 2018 |
| Paxson Wojcik; SG | Recruit ratings: Scout: Rivals: 247Sports: ESPN: (NR) | | | | |
| Thomas Welch; PF | Naperville, IL | Naperville North High School | 6 ft 6 in (1.98 m) | 195 lb (88 kg) | Aug 9, 2018 |
| Thomas Welch; PF | Recruit ratings: Scout: Rivals: 247Sports: ESPN: (NR) | | | | |
| Marquise Kennedy; PG | Chicago, IL | Brother Rice High School | 6 ft 1 in (1.85 m) | 165 lb (75 kg) | Sep 17, 2018 |
| Marquise Kennedy; PG | Recruit ratings: Scout: Rivals: 247Sports: ESPN: (NR) | | | | |
Overall recruit ranking: Scout: #93 Rivals: #58 247Sports: #103
Note: In many cases, Scout, Rivals, 247Sports, On3, and ESPN may conflict in their listings of height and weight.; In these cases, the average was taken. ESPN grades are on a 100-point scale.; Sources: "2019 Team Ranking". Rivals.

== Roster ==
2018–19 Loyola Ramblers men's basketball team
Players
Coaches

| Pos. | # | Name | Height | Weight | Year | Previous school | Hometown |
|---|---|---|---|---|---|---|---|
| G | 1 | Lucas Williamson | 6 ft 4 in (1.93 m) | 205 lb (93 kg) | So | Whitney Young | Chicago, IL |
| G | 2 | Jake Baughman (W) | 6 ft 3 in (1.91 m) | 180 lb (82 kg) | Jr | Central Catholic | Bloomington, IL |
| G | 4 | Bruno Skokna | 6 ft 4 in (1.93 m) | 175 lb (79 kg) | Jr | Košarkaški klub Gorica | Zagreb, Croatia |
| G | 5 | Marques Townes | 6 ft 4 in (1.93 m) | 208 lb (94 kg) | RS Sr | St. Joseph; Fairleigh Dickinson | Edison, NJ |
| F | 12 | Christian Negrón | 6 ft 7 in (2.01 m) | 225 lb (102 kg) | So | Larkin | Elgin, IL |
| G | 13 | Clayton Custer | 6 ft 1 in (1.85 m) | 185 lb (84 kg) | RS Sr | Blue Valley Northwest; Iowa State | Overland Park, KS |
| G | 22 | Isaiah Bujdoso | 6 ft 3 in (1.91 m) | 190 lb (86 kg) | Fr | Sunrise Christian Academy | Hamilton, ON |
| G | 23 | Cooper Kaifes | 6 ft 3 in (1.91 m) | 195 lb (88 kg) | Fr | Mill Valley | Shawnee, KS |
| G | 24 | Tate Hall (redshirt) | 6 ft 6 in (1.98 m) | 220 lb (100 kg) | Jr | Greenfield-Central; Indianapolis | Greenfield, IN |
| C | 25 | Cameron Krutwig | 6 ft 9 in (2.06 m) | 255 lb (116 kg) | So | Jacobs | Algonquin, IL |
| F | 30 | Aher Uguak | 6 ft 7 in (2.01 m) | 225 lb (102 kg) | RS So | Harry Ainlay; New Mexico | Edmonton, AB |
| F | 31 | Dylan Boehm (W) | 6 ft 5 in (1.96 m) | 205 lb (93 kg) | So | Loyola | Los Angeles, CA |
| F | 33 | Franklin Agunanne | 6 ft 9 in (2.06 m) | 245 lb (111 kg) | Fr | La Lumiere | Abuja, Nigeria |
| F | 45 | Will Alcock (W) | 6 ft 7 in (2.01 m) | 205 lb (93 kg) | Fr | Zionsville Community | Zionsville, IN |

Head coach

- Porter Moser (Creighton)

Assistant coach(es)

- Bryan Mullins (Southern Illinois)
- Matt Gordon (Illinois State)
- Drew Valentine (Oakland)

Legend

- (C) Team captain
- (S) Suspended
- (I) Ineligible
- (W) Walk-on
- Injured
- Current redshirt

Roster

== Schedule and results ==
| Date time, TV | Rank^{#} | Opponent^{#} | Result | Record | Site (attendance) city, state |
Exhibition
| Oct 23, 2018*; 7:00 pm | | Winona State | W 82–52 | | Joseph J. Gentile Arena (2,882); Chicago, IL |
Non-conference regular season
| Nov 6, 2018*; 8:00 pm, NBCSCH | | UMKC | W 76–45 | 1–0 | Joseph J. Gentile Arena; Chicago, IL |
| Nov 9, 2018*; 7:00 pm, NBCSCH | | Furman | L 58–60 | 2-0 | Joseph J. Gentile Arena; Chicago, IL |
| Nov 14, 2018*; 7:00 pm, ESPN+ | | Niagara; Fort Myers Tip Off | W 75–62 | 3-0 | Joseph J. Gentile Arena; Chicago, IL |
| Nov 16, 2018*; 7:00 pm, ESPN+ | | Grambling State; Fort Myers Tip Off | W 80–64 | 4-0 | Joseph J. Gentile Arena; Chicago, IL |
| Nov 19, 2018*; 5:30 pm, FS1 | | vs. Richmond; Fort Myers Tip-Off semifinals | W 82–66 | 5-0 | Suncoast Credit Union Arena; Fort Myers, FL |
| Nov 21, 2018*; 8:30 pm, FS1 | | vs. Boston College; Fort Myers Tip-Off championship | L 66-78 | 5-1 | Suncoast Credit Union Arena; Fort Myers, FL |
| Nov 27, 2018*; 7:00 pm, ESPNews | | No. 5 Nevada; MW–MVC Challenge | L 65–79 | 5-2 | Joseph J. Gentile Arena; Chicago, IL |
| Dec 1, 2018*; 3:00 pm, NBCSCH | | at UIC | W 73–64 | 5–3 | Credit Union 1 Arena (3,539); Chicago, IL |
| Dec 5, 2018*; 8:00 pm, NBCSCH | | Ball State | L 69–75 | 5–4 | Joseph J. Gentile Arena (2,831); Chicago, IL |
| Dec 8, 2018*; 3:00 pm, BTN | | vs. No. 23 Maryland; Baltimore Showcase | L 41–55 | 5–5 | Royal Farms Arena (3,640); Baltimore, MD |
| Dec 16, 2018*; 3:00 pm, ESPN+ | | Norfolk State | W 80–49 | 6–5 | Joseph J. Gentile Arena (3,412); Chicago, IL |
| Dec 18, 2018*; 7:00 pm, ESPN+ | | Benedictine | W 75–47 | 7–5 | Joseph J. Gentile Arena (2,139); Chicago, IL |
| Dec 22, 2018*; 4:00 pm, CBSSN | | vs. Saint Joseph's; The Palestra Showcase | L 42–45 | 7–6 | Palestra (5,735); Philadelphia, PA |
Missouri Valley regular season
| Jan 2, 2019; 8:00 pm, NBCSCH | | Indiana State | W 79–44 | 8–6 (1–0) | Joseph J. Gentile Arena (3,102); Chicago, IL |
| Jan 5, 2019; 2:00 pm, ESPN+ | | at Drake | W 85-74 | 9–6 (2–0) | Knapp Center (4,279); Des Moines, IA |
| Jan 8, 2019; 7:00 pm, CBSSN | | at Evansville | L 48–67 | 9–7 (2–1) | Ford Center (5,049); Evansville, IN |
| Jan 12, 2019; 1:00 pm, ESPN2 | | Illinois State | W 67–64 | 10–7 (3–1) | Joseph J. Gentile Arena (4,513); Chicago, IL |
| Jan 15, 2019; 7:00 pm, NBCSCH | | Valparaiso | W 71–54 | 11–7 (4–1) | Joseph J. Gentile Arena (3,412); Chicago, IL |
| Jan 19, 2019; 1:00 pm, ESPNU | | at Indiana State | W 75–67 | 12–7 (5–1) | Hulman Center (10,200); Terre Haute, IN |
| Jan 23, 2019; 8:00 pm, CBSSN | | at Missouri State | L 35–70 | 12–8 (5–2) | JQH Arena (4,863); Springfield, MO |
| Jan 27, 2019; 3:00 pm, CBSSN | | Southern Illinois | W 75–50 | 13–8 (6–2) | Joseph J. Gentile Arena (4,712); Chicago, IL |
| Jan 30, 2019; 6:00 pm, NBCSCH+ | | Northern Iowa | W 61–60 | 14–8 (7–2) | Joseph J. Gentile Arena (3,011); Chicago, IL |
| Feb 2, 2019; 9:00 pm, ESPN2 | | at Illinois State | L 57–65 | 14–9 (7–3) | Redbird Arena (8,107); Normal, IL |
| Feb 5, 2019; 6:00 pm, CBSSN | | Drake | W 86–64 | 15–9 (8–3) | Joseph J. Gentile Arena (3,611); Chicago, IL |
| Feb 10, 2019; 3:00 pm, ESPNU | | at Valparaiso | W 56–51 | 16–9 (9–3) | Athletics–Recreation Center (5,148); Valparaiso, IN |
| Feb 13, 2019; 7:00 pm, NBCSCH | | at Bradley | L 54–61 | 16–10 (9–4) | Carver Arena (5,490); Peoria, IL |
| Feb 17, 2019; 3:00 pm, ESPNU/ESPN3 | | Missouri State | L 61–65 | 16–11 (9–5) | Joseph J. Gentile Arena (4,722); Chicago, IL |
| Feb 20, 2019; 6:00 pm, NBCSCH | | Evansville | W 70–58 | 17–11 (10–5) | Joseph J. Gentile Arena; Chicago, IL |
| Feb 24, 2019; 3:00 pm, ESPNU | | at Southern Illinois | L 53–63 | 17–12 (10–6) | SIU Arena; Carbondale, IL |
| Feb 27, 2019; 7:00 pm, ESPN+/ESPN3 | | at Northern Iowa | W 56–55 | 18–12 (11–6) | McLeod Center; Cedar Falls, IA |
| Mar 2, 2019; 5:00 pm, ESPN2 | | Bradley | W 81–68 | 19–12 (12–6) | Joseph J. Gentile Arena; Chicago, IL |
Missouri Valley tournament
| Mar 8, 2019; 12:00 pm, NBCSCH | (1) | vs. (9) Valparaiso; Quarterfinals | W 67–54 | 20–12 | Enterprise Center; St. Louis, MO |
| Mar 9, 2019; 2:30 pm, CBSSN | (1) | vs. (5) Bradley; Semifinals | L 51–53 | 20–13 | Enterprise Center; St. Louis, MO |
NIT
| Mar 19, 2019*; 8:00 pm, ESPNU | (7) | at (2) Creighton; First round – TCU bracket | L 61–70 | 20–14 | CHI Health Center Omaha (5,755); Omaha, NE |
*Non-conference game. ^{#}Rankings from AP Poll. (#) Tournament seedings in parentheses. All times are in Central Time.

== Rankings ==
Ranking movements Legend: RV = Received votes
| | Week | | | | | | | | | | | | | | | | | | | |
| Poll | Pre | 1 | 2 | 3 | 4 | 5 | 6 | 7 | 8 | 9 | 10 | 11 | 12 | 13 | 14 | 15 | 16 | 17 | 18 | Final |
|---|---|---|---|---|---|---|---|---|---|---|---|---|---|---|---|---|---|---|---|---|
| AP | RV | RV | RV | | | | | | | | | | | | | | | | | Not released |
| Coaches | RV | | | | | | | | | | | | | | | | | | | |
