= 2018–19 Valparaiso Crusaders men's basketball team =

American college basketball season

2018–19 Valparaiso Crusaders men's basketball
- Conference: Missouri Valley Conference
- Record: 15–18 (7–11 MVC)
- Head coach: Matt Lottich (3rd season)
- Assistant coaches: Luke Gore; Todd Townsend; Rob Holloway
- Home arena: Athletics–Recreation Center

2018–19 Missouri Valley Conference men's basketball standings
	Conf.				Overall
Team	W		L	PCT	W		L	PCT
Loyola Chicago	12	–	6	.667	20	–	14	.588
Drake	12	–	6	.667	24	–	10	.706
Southern Illinois	10	–	8	.556	17	–	15	.531
Missouri State	10	–	8	.556	16	–	16	.500
Bradley †	9	–	9	.500	20	–	15	.571
Northern Iowa	9	–	9	.500	16	–	18	.471
Illinois State	9	–	9	.500	17	–	16	.515
Indiana State	7	–	11	.389	15	–	16	.484
Valparaiso	7	–	11	.389	15	–	18	.455
Evansville	5	–	13	.278	11	–	21	.344
† 2019 MVC tournament winner

The 2018–19 Valparaiso Crusaders men's basketball team represented Valparaiso University during the 2018–19 NCAA Division I men's basketball season. The Crusaders, led by third-year head coach Matt Lottich, played their home games at the Athletics–Recreation Center as second-year members of the Missouri Valley Conference. They finished the season 15–18, 7–11 in MVC play to finish in a tie for eighth place. As the No. 9 seed in the MVC tournament, they defeated Indiana State in the first round before losing to Loyola in the quarterfinals.

== Previous season ==
The Crusaders finished the 2017–18 season 15–17, 6–12 in MVC play to finish in last place in their first season as members of the MVC. They lost in the first round of the Missouri Valley tournament to Missouri State.

== Offseason ==
=== Departures ===
Name	Number	Pos.	Height	Weight	Year	Hometown	Reason for departure
Parker Hazen	0	F	6'7"	210	Freshman	Columbia City, IN	Transferred to Daytona State College
Tevonn Walker	2	G	6'2"	210	Senior	Montreal, QC	Graduated
Max Joseph	3	G	6'1"	210	Senior	Montreal, QC	Graduated
Joe Burton	10	G/F	6'8"	210	RS Junior	Porter, TX	Left the team for personal reasons; transferred to Georgetown
Marten Linssen	12	F	6'8"	240	Freshman	Düsseldorf, Germany	Transferred to UNC Wilmington

=== Incoming transfers ===
Name	Number	Pos.	Height	Weight	Year	Hometown	Previous School
Deion Lavender	2	G	6'4"	190	RS Senior	Alton, IL	Transferred from UAB. Was eligible to play immediately since Lavender graduated from UAB.
Eron Gordon		G	6'3"	200	Junior	Indianapolis, IN	Transferred from Seton Hall. Under NCAA transfer rules, Gordon had to sit out for the 2018–19 season, after which he had two years of eligibility.
Nick Robinson		G	6'6"	195	Junior	Chicago, IL	Transferred from Saint Joseph's. Under NCAA transfer rules, Robinson had to sit out for the 2018–19 season, after which he had two years of eligibility.

=== 2018 recruiting class ===
College recruiting
Name	Hometown	School	Height	Weight	Commit date
Javon Freeman-Liberty #41 SG	Chicago, IL	Whitney Young	6 ft 4 in (1.93 m)	170 lb (77 kg)	
Javon Freeman-Liberty #41 SG	Recruit ratings: (79)				
Daniel Sackey; PG	Winnipeg, Canada	Thornlea Secondary School	5 ft 10 in (1.78 m)	170 lb (77 kg)	
Daniel Sackey; PG	Recruit ratings: No ratings found				
Overall recruit ranking:
Note: In many cases, Scout, Rivals, 247Sports, On3, and ESPN may conflict in their listings of height and weight.; In these cases, the average was taken. ESPN grades are on a 100-point scale.; Sources:

== Roster ==
2018–19 Valparaiso Crusaders men's basketball team
Players
Coaches

Pos.	#	Name	Height	Weight	Year	Previous school	Hometown
G	0	Javon Freeman-Liberty	6 ft 3 in (1.91 m)	175 lb (79 kg)	Fr	Whitney Young HS	Chicago, IL
G	1	Micah Bradford	6 ft 2 in (1.88 m)	155 lb (70 kg)	Jr	Bradley–Bourbonnais HS	Bradley, IL
G	2	Deion Lavender	6 ft 3 in (1.91 m)	190 lb (86 kg)	RS Sr	Marquette Catholic HS; Southern Illinois/UAB	Alton, IL
G	3	Daniel Sackey	5 ft 9 in (1.75 m)	175 lb (79 kg)	Fr	Thornlea	Winnipeg, MB
G	4	Bakari Evelyn	6 ft 2 in (1.88 m)	180 lb (82 kg)	RS Jr	Southfield Christian School/Nebraska	Detroit, MI
G/F	5	Markus Golder	6 ft 6 in (1.98 m)	195 lb (88 kg)	RS Jr	Clackamas HS; North Idaho College	Portland, OR
G	12	Langston Stalling (W)	6 ft 3 in (1.91 m)	210 lb (95 kg)	Fr	Bowman Academy	Gary, IN
C	14	Jaume Sorolla	7 ft 0 in (2.13 m)	240 lb (109 kg)	Jr	Sunrise Christian Academy (KS)	Tortosa, Spain
C	21	Derrik Smits	7 ft 1 in (2.16 m)	240 lb (109 kg)	RS Jr	Zionsville HS	Zionsville, IN
F	23	Mileek McMillan	6 ft 8 in (2.03 m)	220 lb (100 kg)	So	Merrillville HS	Merrillville, IN
G/F	33	John Kiser	6 ft 5 in (1.96 m)	205 lb (93 kg)	Jr	Noblesville HS	Noblesville, IN
G/F	35	Ryan Fazekas	6 ft 7 in (2.01 m)	220 lb (100 kg)	RS Jr	Marquette Catholic HS/Providence	Chesterton, IN
G		Eron Gordon (redshirt)	6 ft 3 in (1.91 m)	200 lb (91 kg)	Jr	Cathedral HS; Seton Hall	Indianapolis, IN
G		Nick Robinson (redshirt)	6 ft 6 in (1.98 m)	195 lb (88 kg)	Jr	Kenwood Academy; Saint Joseph's	Chicago, IL

Head coach

- Matt Lottich (Stanford)

Assistant coach(es)

- Luke Gore (Bethel (TN))
- Todd Townsend (Marquette)
- Rob Holloway (Eastern Illinois)

Legend

- (C) Team captain
- (S) Suspended
- (I) Ineligible
- (W) Walk-on
- Injured
- Current redshirt

Roster

== Schedule and results ==
Date time, TV	Rank^{#}	Opponent^{#}	Result	Record	Site (attendance) city, state
Exhibition
Nov 1, 2018*; 7:00 pm		Indianapolis	W 60–57		Athletics–Recreation Center (2,256); Valparaiso, IN
Non-conference regular season
Nov 6, 2018*; 7:00 pm, ESPN3		Concordia University Chicago	W 121–65	1–0	Athletics–Recreation Center (2,098); Valparaiso, IN
Nov 15, 2018*; 4:00 pm, ESPNU		vs. Western Kentucky; Myrtle Beach Invitational quarterfinals	L 71-83	1–1	HTC Center (3,620); Conway, SC
Nov 16, 2018*; 5:30 pm, ESPN3		vs. Monmouth; Myrtle Beach Invitational consolation 2nd round	W 64–53	2–1	HTC Center (2,830); Conway, SC
Nov 18, 2018*; 9:30 am, ESPNU		vs. Wake Forest; Myrtle Beach Invitational consolation 5th place game	L 63-69	2–2	HTC Center (639); Conway, SC
Nov 21, 2018*; 7:00 pm, ESPN+		SIU Edwardsville	W 75–70 ^{OT}	3–2	Athletics–Recreation Center (1,940); Valparaiso, IN
Nov 24, 2018*; 1:00 pm, ATTSPT		at West Virginia; Myrtle Beach Invitational non-bracket game	L 76–88	3–3	WVU Coliseum (9,188); Morgantown, WV
Nov 28, 2018*; 9:30 pm, ATTSNRM		at UNLV; MW–MVC Challenge	W 72–64	4–3	Thomas & Mack Center (7,587); Las Vegas, NV
Dec 2, 2018*; 1:00 pm, ESPN+		UC Riverside	W 82–73	5–3	Athletics–Recreation Center (2,112); Valparaiso, IN
Dec 4, 2018*; 7:00 pm, ESPN3		High Point	L 53–55	5–4	Athletics–Recreation Center (2,479); Valparaiso, IN
Dec 8, 2018*; 3:00 pm, ESPN+		at George Washington	W 82–79	6–4	Charles E. Smith Center (2,107); Washington, D.C.
Dec 17, 2018*; 7:00 pm, ESPN+		Ball State	L 61–77	6–5	Athletics–Recreation Center (3,636); Valparaiso, IN
Dec 19, 2018*; 7:30 pm, SECN+		at Texas A&M	L 41-79	6–6	Reed Arena (6,684); College Station, TX
Dec 29, 2018*; 1:00 pm, ESPN3		Purdue Northwest	W 97–61	7–6	Athletics–Recreation Center (1,925); Valparaiso, IN
MVC regular season
Jan 2, 2019; 7:00 pm, ESPN+		Illinois State	W 58–56	8–6 (1–0)	Athletics–Recreation Center (3,818); Valparaiso, IN
Jan 5, 2019; 1:00 pm, ESPN3		at Missouri State	W 82–66	9–6 (2–0)	JQH Arena (4,179); Springfield, MO
Jan 8, 2019; 7:00 pm, ESPN+		Bradley	W 61–50	10–6 (3–0)	Athletics–Recreation Center (2,535); Valparaiso, IN
Jan 12, 2019; 3:00 pm, FSMW/NBCSCH		at Southern Illinois	W 65–61	11–6 (4–0)	SIU Arena (4,671); Carbondale, IL
Jan 15, 2019; 7:00 pm, NBCSCH		at Loyola–Chicago	L 54-71	11–7 (4–1)	Joseph J. Gentile Arena (3,412); Chicago, IL
Jan 19, 2019; 3:00 pm, FSMW/NBCSCH		Northern Iowa	W 75–66	12–7 (5–1)	Athletics–Recreation Center (3,160); Valparaiso, IN
Jan 23, 2019; 6:00 pm, ESPN3		at Indiana State	L 53-70	12–8 (5–2)	Hulman Center (3,460); Terre Haute, IN
Jan 26, 2019; 7:00 pm, ESPN3		Drake	L 59-70	12–9 (5–3)	Athletics–Recreation Center (4,160); Valparaiso, IN
Jan 29, 2019; 7:00 pm, ESPN+		Missouri State	L 54-55 ^{OT}	12–10 (5–4)	Athletics–Recreation Center (1,333); Valparaiso, IN
Feb 2, 2019; 1:00 pm, FSMW/NBCSCH		at Evansville	L 53–64	12–11 (5–5)	Ford Center (5,805); Evansville, IN
Feb 5, 2019; 7:00 pm, ESPN+		at Illinois State	W 69–53	13–11 (6–5)	Redbird Arena (4,662); Bloomington, IL
Feb 10, 2019; 3:00 pm, ESPNU		Loyola–Chicago	L 51–56	13–12 (6–6)	Athletics–Recreation Center (5,148); Valparaiso, IN
Feb 13, 2019; 7:00 pm, ESPN3		Indiana State	L 82-87 ^{OT}	13–13 (6–7)	Athletics–Recreation Center (3,014); Valparaiso, IN
Feb 16, 2019; 2:00 pm, ESPN3		at Drake	L 79-84	13–14 (6–8)	Knapp Center (4,035); Des Moines, IA
Feb 20, 2019; 7:00 pm, ESPN+		Southern Illinois	W 55–52	14–14 (7–8)	Athletics–Recreation Center (2,371); Valparaiso, IN
Feb 23, 2019; 7:00 pm, ESPN3		at Northern Iowa	L 53-64	14–15 (7–9)	McLeod Center (3,812); Cedar Falls, IA
Feb 27, 2019; 7:00 pm, ESPN+		at Bradley	L 42-67	14–16 (7–10)	Carver Arena (5,867); Peoria, IL
Mar 2, 2019; 1:00 pm, ESPN+		Evansville	L 63-65	14–17 (7–11)	Athletics–Recreation Center (2,592); Valparaiso, IN
MVC tournament
Mar 7, 2019; 6:00 pm, ESPN+	(9)	vs. (8) Indiana State; First Round	W 77–55	15–17	Enterprise Center (0); St. Louis, MO
Mar 8, 2019; 12:00 pm, ESPN+	(9)	vs. (1) Loyola-Chicago; First Round	L 54-67	15-18	Enterprise Center (0); St. Louis, MO
*Non-conference game. ^{#}Rankings from AP Poll. (#) Tournament seedings in parentheses. All times are in Central Time.
