= 2018–19 Missouri Valley Conference men's basketball season =

- League: NCAA Division I
- Sport: Basketball
- Teams: 10
- TV partner(s): ESPN3, CBSSN, CBS

Regular Season
- 2019 MVC Champions: Loyola & Drake
- Season MVP: Marques Townes, Loyola

Tournament
- Champions: Bradley
- Runners-up: Northern Iowa
- Finals MVP: Elijah Childs, Bradley

Basketball seasons
- 2017–18 2019–20

2018–19 Missouri Valley Conference men's basketball standings
	Conf.				Overall
Team	W		L	PCT	W		L	PCT
Loyola Chicago	12	–	6	.667	20	–	14	.588
Drake	12	–	6	.667	24	–	10	.706
Southern Illinois	10	–	8	.556	17	–	15	.531
Missouri State	10	–	8	.556	16	–	16	.500
Bradley †	9	–	9	.500	20	–	15	.571
Northern Iowa	9	–	9	.500	16	–	18	.471
Illinois State	9	–	9	.500	17	–	16	.515
Indiana State	7	–	11	.389	15	–	16	.484
Valparaiso	7	–	11	.389	15	–	18	.455
Evansville	5	–	13	.278	11	–	21	.344
† 2019 MVC tournament winner

The 2018–19 Missouri Valley Conference men's basketball season began with practices in October 2018, followed by the start of the 2018–19 NCAA Division I men's basketball season on November 6, 2018. Conference play began in late December 2018 and concluded in March with the Missouri Valley Conference tournament at Enterprise Center in St. Louis, Missouri.

Defending regular season and tournament champion Loyola shared the regular season title with Drake at 12-6.

Bradley defeated Northern Iowa in the championship game to win the Missouri Valley Conference tournament and thereby received the conference's automatic bid to the NCAA Tournament.

Bradley received the conference's only bid to the NCAA Tournament and lost to Michigan State in the first round, 76-65. Loyola-Chicago received a bid to the NIT and lost in the first round at Creighton, 70-61.

Drake was the only other conference school that received a bid to a postseason tournament, receiving a bid to the CollegeInsider.com Tournament where they lost in the first round at Southern Utah, 80-73.

== Head coaches ==
=== Coaching changes ===
On March 3, 2018, Missouri State announced that head coach Paul Lusk had been fired. He finished with a seven-year record of 106–121. The school announced that former Tennessee State head coach Dana Ford had been named head coach of the Bears on March 21.

On March 13, 2018, Evansville fired head coach Marty Simmons. He finished at Evansville with an 11-year record of 184–175. On March 22, the school hired Boston Celtics assistant coach, former Kentucky player and Evansville native Walter McCarty as head coach.

On March 22, 2018, Drake announced that head coach Niko Medved had accepted the head coaching position at Colorado State, where he had previously served as an assistant. A week after Medved's departure, Drake hired Creighton assistant and Iowa native Darian DeVries for the head coaching job.

=== Coaches ===
Team	Head coach	Previous job	Years at school	Overall record	MVC record	MVC titles	NCAA Tournaments
Bradley	Brian Wardle	Green Bay	3	38–60	19–35	0	0
Drake	Darian DeVries	Creighton (Asst.)	1	0–0	0–0	0	0
Evansville	Walter McCarty	Boston Celtics (Asst.)	1	0–0	0–0	0	0
Illinois State	Dan Muller	Vanderbilt (Asst.)	6	122–80	75–48	1	0
Indiana State	Greg Lansing	Indiana State (Asst.)	8	133–126	73–71	0	1
Loyola	Porter Moser	Saint Louis (Asst.)	7	121–111	42–58	1	1
Missouri State	Dana Ford	Tennessee State	1	0–0	0–0	0	0
Northern Iowa	Ben Jacobson	Northern Iowa (Asst.)	12	250–150	130–86	2	4
Southern Illinois	Barry Hinson	Kansas (Adm.)	6	99–96	47–55	0	0
Valparaiso	Matt Lottich	Valparaiso (Asst.)	2	39–26	6–12	0	0

Notes:

- All records, appearances, titles, etc. are from time with current school only.
- Overall and MVC records are from time at current school and are through the beginning of the season.
- Ford, Lottich, and Moser's conference records only includes MVC play, not other conference records.

== Preseason ==
=== Preseason poll ===
Rank	Team
1.	Loyola (29)
2.	Illinois State (10)
3.	Southern Illinois (4)
4.	Bradley
5.	Northern Iowa
6.	Indiana State
7.	Valparaiso
8.	Missouri State
9.	Drake
10.	Evansville
(first place votes)

=== Preseason All-MVC teams ===
Honor	Recipient
Preseason Player of the Year	Clayton Custer, Loyola
Preseason All-MVC First Team
Preseason All-MVC First Team	Jordan Barnes, Indiana State
Preseason All-MVC First Team	Clayton Custer, Loyola
Preseason All-MVC First Team	Phil Fayne, Illinois State
Preseason All-MVC First Team	Armon Fletcher, Southern Illinois
Preseason All-MVC First Team	Milik Yarbrough, Illinois State
Preseason All-MVC Second Team
Preseason All-MVC Second Team	Darrell Brown, Bradley
Preseason All-MVC Second Team	Keyshawn Evans, Illinois State
Preseason All-MVC Second Team	Cameron Krutwig, Loyola
Preseason All-MVC Second Team	Kavion Pippen, Southern Illinois
Preseason All-MVC Second Team	Marques Townes, Loyola

== Regular season ==
=== Conference matrix ===
This table summarizes the head-to-head results between teams in conference play. Each team will play 18 conference games, playing each team twice.

	Bradley	Drake	Evansville	Illinois State	Indiana State	Loyola	Missouri State	Northern Iowa	Southern Illinois	Valparaiso
vs. Bradley	–	2–0	0–2	0–2	1–1	1–1	2–0	1–1	1–1	1–1
vs. Drake	0–2	–	1–1	2–0	0–2	2–0	0–2	1–1	0–2	0–2
vs. Evansville	2–0	1–1	–	2–0	2–0	1–1	1–1	2–0	2–0	0–2
vs. Illinois State	2–0	0–2	0–2	–	1–1	1–1	1–1	1–1	1–1	2–0
vs. Indiana State	1–1	2–0	0–2	1–1	–	2–0	2–0	1–1	2–0	0–2
vs. Loyola	1–1	0–2	1–1	1–1	0–2	–	2–0	0–2	1–1	0–2
vs. Missouri State	0–2	2–0	1–1	1–1	0–2	0–2	–	2–0	1–1	1–1
vs. Northern Iowa	1–1	1–1	0–2	1–1	1–1	2–0	0–2	–	2–0	1–1
vs. Southern Illinois	1–1	2–0	0–2	1–1	0–2	1–1	1–1	0–2	–	2–0
vs. Valparaiso	1–1	2–0	2–0	0–2	2–0	2–0	1–1	1–1	0–2	–
Total	9–9	12–6	5–13	9–9	7–11	12–6	10–8	9–9	10–8	7–11

== Postseason ==
=== Coaches ===
Honor	Recipient
Coach of the Year	Darian DeVries, Drake

=== All-Conference Teams ===
Honor	Recipient
Larry Bird Player of the Year	Marques Townes, Loyola-Chicago
Defensive MVP	Nick McGlynn, Drake
Sixth-Man of the Year	Spencer Haldeman, Northern Iowa
Sixth-Man of the Year	Nate Kennell, Bradley
Newcomer of the Year	Tulio Da Silva, Missouri State
Freshman of the Year	A. J. Green, Northern Iowa
First Team
First Team	Tulio Da Silva, Missouri State
First Team	Phil Fayne, Illinois State
First Team	Cameron Krutwig, Loyola-Chicago
First Team	Nick McGlynn, Drake
First Team	Marques Townes, Loyola-Chicago
Second Team
Second Team	Darrell Brown, Bradley
Second Team	Brady Ellingson, Drake
Second Team	Armon Fletcher, Southern Illinois
Second Team	Tyreke Key, Indiana State
Second Team	Milik Yarbrough, Illinois State
Third Team
Third Team	Elijah Childs, Bradley
Third Team	Keandre Cook, Missouri State
Third Team	Clayton Custer, Loyola-Chicago
Third Team	A. J. Green, Northern Iowa
Third Team	Kavion Pippen, Southern Illinois
