= 2018–19 Drake Bulldogs men's basketball team =

American college basketball season

2018–19 Drake Bulldogs men's basketball

Missouri Valley regular season co-champions Las Vegas Classic Orleans Bracket champions

CIT, First round
- Conference: Missouri Valley Conference
- Record: 24–10 (12–6 MVC)
- Head coach: Darian DeVries (1st season)
- Assistant coaches: Larry Blunt; Marty Richter; Matt Woodley
- Home arena: Knapp Center

2018–19 Missouri Valley Conference men's basketball standings
	Conf.				Overall
Team	W		L	PCT	W		L	PCT
Loyola Chicago	12	–	6	.667	20	–	14	.588
Drake	12	–	6	.667	24	–	10	.706
Southern Illinois	10	–	8	.556	17	–	15	.531
Missouri State	10	–	8	.556	16	–	16	.500
Bradley †	9	–	9	.500	20	–	15	.571
Northern Iowa	9	–	9	.500	16	–	18	.471
Illinois State	9	–	9	.500	17	–	16	.515
Indiana State	7	–	11	.389	15	–	16	.484
Valparaiso	7	–	11	.389	15	–	18	.455
Evansville	5	–	13	.278	11	–	21	.344
† 2019 MVC tournament winner

The 2018–19 Drake Bulldogs men's basketball team represented Drake University during the 2018–19 NCAA Division I men's basketball season. The Bulldogs were led by first-year head coach Darian DeVries. They played their home games at Knapp Center in Des Moines, Iowa as members of the Missouri Valley Conference. They finished the season 24–10, 12–6 to earn a share of the MVC regular season championship. As the No. 2 seed in the MVC tournament, they defeated Illinois State before losing to Northern Iowa in the semifinals. They received a bid to the CollegeInsider.com Tournament where they lost in the first round to Southern Utah.

== Previous season ==
The Bulldogs finished the 2017–18 season 17–17, 10–8 in MVC play to finish in to finish in a tie for third place. They lost in the quarterfinals of the MVC tournament to Bradley. They were invited to the CollegeInsider.com Tournament where they defeated Abilene Christian in the first round in a game referred to as the Lou Henson Classic. In the second round they were defeated by Northern Colorado.

On March 22, 2018, it was announced that head coach Niko Medved had accepted the head coaching position at Colorado State, where he had previously served as an assistant. A week after Medved's departure, Drake hired Creighton assistant and Iowa native Darian DeVries for the head coaching job.

== Offseason ==
=== Departures ===
Name	Number	Pos.	Height	Weight	Year	Hometown	Reason for departure
C. J. Rivers	0	G	6'2"	187	Senior	Cahokia, IL	Graduated
Jalen Gibbs	2	G	6'3"	180	Freshman	Waldorf, MD	Transferred to Mount St. Mary's
Graham Woodward	3	G	6'0"	182	RS Senior	Edina, MN	Graduated
De'Antae McMurray	4	G	6'2"	170	Senior	Alton, IL	Graduated
Reed Timmer	12	G	6'1"	185	Senior	New Berlin, WI	Graduated
Casey Schlatter	22	F	6'10"	207	RS Junior	Iowa Falls, IA	Graduate transferred to Grand View
Ore Arogundade	23	G	6'3"	185	Senior	Arlington Heights, IL	Graduated
Kory Kuenstling	32	F/C	6'11"	234	RS Junior	Dunketon, IA	Graduate transferred to Grand View

=== Incoming transfers ===
Name	Number	Pos.	Height	Weight	Year	Hometown	Previous School
D. J. Wilkins	0	G	6'2"	170	RS Freshman	Merrillville, IN	Junior college transferred from Florida SouthWestern State College
Tremell Murphy	2	F	6'6"	205	Junior	Griffith, IN	Junior college transferred from Florida SouthWestern State College
Anthony Murphy	4	G	6'5"	185	Junior	Griffith, IN	Junior college transferred from Florida SouthWestern State College
Roman Penn	12	G	5'11"	180	Sophomore	Calumet City, IL	Transferred from Siena. Under NCAA transfer rules, Penn will have to sit out for the 2018–19 season. Will have three years of remaining eligibility.
Nick Norton	20	G	5'10"	166	RS Senior	Bloomington, IL	Transferred from UAB. Was eligible to play immediately since he graduated from UAB.
Brady Ellingson	24	G	6'4"	193	RS Senior	Menomonee Falls, WI	Transferred from Iowa. Was eligible to play immediately since he graduated from Iowa.

=== 2018 recruiting class ===
College recruiting information
Name	Hometown	School	Height	Weight	Commit date
Matthew Gray; PF	Orange, Australia	Canobolas Rural Technology High School	6 ft 8 in (2.03 m)	N/A	Dec 20, 2017
Matthew Gray; PF	Recruit ratings: Scout: Rivals: (NR)				
Liam Robbins; C	Davenport, IA	Sunrise Christian Academy	7 ft 0 in (2.13 m)	235 lb (107 kg)	Apr 17, 2018
Liam Robbins; C	Recruit ratings: Scout: Rivals: (NR)				
Overall recruit ranking:
Note: In many cases, Scout, Rivals, 247Sports, On3, and ESPN may conflict in their listings of height and weight.; In these cases, the average was taken. ESPN grades are on a 100-point scale.; Sources: "2018 Team Ranking". Rivals.

=== 2019 recruiting class ===
College recruiting information (2019)
Name	Hometown	School	Height	Weight	Commit date
Joe Yesufu #49 PG	Bolingbrook, IL	Bolingbrook High School	5 ft 11 in (1.80 m)	215 lb (98 kg)	Aug 26, 2018
Joe Yesufu #49 PG	Recruit ratings: Scout: Rivals: (76)				
Nate Ferguson; PF	Lemont, IL	Lemont High School	6 ft 7 in (2.01 m)	N/A	
Nate Ferguson; PF	Recruit ratings: Scout: Rivals: (NR)				
Issa Samake; PF	Mali	Hamilton Heights Christian Academy	6 ft 7 in (2.01 m)	200 lb (91 kg)	Jun 24, 2018
Issa Samake; PF	Recruit ratings: Scout: Rivals: (NR)				
Overall recruit ranking:
Note: In many cases, Scout, Rivals, 247Sports, On3, and ESPN may conflict in their listings of height and weight.; In these cases, the average was taken. ESPN grades are on a 100-point scale.; Sources: "2019 Team Ranking". Rivals.

== Roster ==
2018–19 Drake Bulldogs men's basketball team
Players
Coaches

Pos.	#	Name	Height	Weight	Year	Previous school	Hometown
G	0	D. J. Wilkins	6 ft 2 in (1.88 m)	179 lb (81 kg)	RS Fr	Florida Southwestern State; Merrillville	Merrillville, IN
G	1	Samm Jones (W)	5 ft 11 in (1.8 m)	196 lb (89 kg)	RS So	Northwestern; De La Salle	Minneapolis, MN
F	2	Tremell Murphy	6 ft 6 in (1.98 m)	202 lb (92 kg)	Jr	Florida Southwestern State; Griffith	Griffith, IN
G	3	Garrett Sturtz (W)	6 ft 3 in (1.91 m)	175 lb (79 kg)	Fr	Newton	Newton, IA
F	4	Anthony Murphy	6 ft 5 in (1.96 m)	189 lb (86 kg)	Jr	Florida Southwestern State; Griffith	Griffith, IN
G	10	Luke Vaske (W)	6 ft 0 in (1.83 m)	182 lb (83 kg)	Fr	Norwalk	Norwalk, IA
F	11	Antonio Pilipovic	6 ft 7 in (2.01 m)	228 lb (103 kg)	So	RheinStars Köln	Cologne, Germany
G	12	Roman Penn (redshirt)	5 ft 11 in (1.8 m)	180 lb (82 kg)	So	Siena; Bishop Noll	Calumet City, IL
F	13	Matt Gray	6 ft 8 in (2.03 m)	224 lb (102 kg)	Fr	Canbolas Rural Tech	Orange, Australia
G	14	Noah Thomas	6 ft 2 in (1.88 m)	163 lb (74 kg)	So	22 Ft Academy	Sydney, Australia
G	20	Nick Norton	5 ft 10 in (1.78 m)	170 lb (77 kg)	RS Sr	UAB; Central Catholic	Bloomington, IL
F	21	Liam Robbins	7 ft 0 in (2.13 m)	235 lb (107 kg)	Fr	Assumption	Davenport, IA
G	22	Brady Ellingson	6 ft 4 in (1.93 m)	191 lb (87 kg)	RS Sr	Iowa; Sussex Hamilton	Menomonee Falls, WI
G	25	Connor Gholson (W)	6 ft 3 in (1.91 m)	182 lb (83 kg)	RS Fr	Newton	Newton, IA
F	35	Nick McGlynn	6 ft 8 in (2.03 m)	244 lb (111 kg)	Sr	Stoughton	Stoughton, WI

Head coach

- Darian DeVries (Northern Iowa)

Assistant coach(es)

- Larry Blunt (James Madison)
- Marty Richter (Simpson)
- Matt Woodley (Drake)

Legend

- (C) Team captain
- (S) Suspended
- (I) Ineligible
- (W) Walk-on
- Injured
- Current redshirt

Roster

== Schedule and results ==
Date time, TV	Rank^{#}	Opponent^{#}	Result	Record	Site (attendance) city, state
Exhibition
Nov 4, 2018*; 2:00 pm		Coe	W 99–58	–	Knapp Center (2,343); Des Moines, IA
Non-conference regular season
Nov 8, 2018*; 7:00 pm, ESPN+		Buena Vista	W 98–52	1–0	Knapp Center (3,561); Des Moines, IA
Nov 13, 2018*; 7:00 pm, P12N		at Colorado	L 71–100	1–1	CU Events Center (5,695); Boulder, CO
Nov 17, 2018*; 2:00 pm, ESPN3		Texas State	W 75–69	2–1	Knapp Center (2,968); Des Moines, IA
Nov 21, 2018*; 6:00 pm, WAC DN		at UMKC	W 66–63	3–1	Municipal Auditorium (2,186); Kansas City, MO
Nov 27, 2018*; 7:00 pm, MC22/ESPN+		Boise State; MW–MVC Challenge	W 83–74	4–1	Knapp Center (2,543); Des Moines, IA
Dec 1, 2018*; 5:30 pm, ESPN+		vs. North Dakota State; U.S. Bank Stadium Classic	W 95–88	5–1	U.S. Bank Stadium (2,186); Minneapolis, MN
Dec 6, 2018*; 7:00 pm, FS WI/ESPN+		at Milwaukee	W 75–61	6–1	UW–Milwaukee Panther Arena (1,395); Milwaukee, WI
Dec 15, 2018*; 3:30 pm, MC22		vs. Iowa State; Hy-Vee Classic	L 68–77	6–2	Wells Fargo Arena (12,236); Des Moines, IA
Dec 17, 2018*; 7:00 pm, MC22/ESPN+		SIU Edwardsville; Las Vegas Classic	W 79–66	7–2	Knapp Center (2,375); Des Moines, IA
Dec 19, 2018*; 7:00 pm, ESPN+		Rider; Las Vegas Classic	W 76–58	8–2	Knapp Center (2,358); Des Moines, IA
Dec 22, 2018*; 6:30 pm, FS2		vs. New Mexico State; Las Vegas Classic semifinals	W 66–63	9–2	Orleans Arena (2,232); Paradise, NV
Dec 23, 2018*; 6:30 pm, FS1		vs. San Diego; Las Vegas Classic championship	W 110–103 ^{2OT}	10–2	Orleans Arena (2,152); Paradise, NV
Dec 29, 2018*; 2:00 pm, ESPN3		McKendree	W 98–70	11–2	Knapp Center (3,008); Des Moines, IA
MVC regular season
Jan 2, 2019; 6:00 pm, ESPN+		at Evansville	L 77–82 ^{2OT}	11–3 (0–1)	Ford Center (5,503); Evansville, IN
Jan 5, 2019; 2:00 pm, ESPN+		Loyola–Chicago	L 74–85	11–4 (0–2)	Knapp Center (4,279); Des Moines, IA
Jan 8, 2019; 7:00 pm, ESPN+		Southern Illinois	W 82–70	12–4 (1–2)	Knapp Center (2,638); Des Moines, IA
Jan 13, 2019; 3:00 pm, FSMW/NBCSCH		at Northern Iowa	L 54–57	12–5 (1–3)	McLeod Center (4,141); Cedar Falls, IA
Jan 16, 2019; 7:00 pm, FSMW/NBCSCH		at Bradley	W 69–52	13–5 (2–3)	Carver Arena (4,654); Peoria, IL
Jan 20, 2019; 3:00 pm, ESPN3		Missouri State	W 74–63	14–5 (3–3)	Knapp Center (3,124); Des Moines, IA
Jan 23, 2019; 7:00 pm, MC22/ESPN+		Evansville	W 78–66	15–5 (4–3)	Knapp Center (2,709); Des Moines, IA
Jan 26, 2019; 7:00 pm, ESPN3		at Valparaiso	W 70–59	16–5 (5–3)	Athletics–Recreation Center (4,160); Valparaiso, IN
Jan 30, 2019; 7:00 pm, MC22/ESPN+		Illinois State	L 55–69	16–6 (5–4)	Knapp Center (3,511); Des Moines, IA
Feb 2, 2019; 1:00 pm, ESPN3		at Indiana State	W 68–62	17–6 (6–4)	Hulman Center (3,529); Terre Haute, IN
Feb 5, 2019; 6:00 pm, CBSSN		at Loyola–Chicago	L 64–86	17–7 (6–5)	Joseph J. Gentile Arena (3,611); Chicago, IL
Feb 9, 2019; 5:00 pm, FSMW/NBCSCH		Northern Iowa	W 83–77	18–7 (7–5)	Knapp Center (5,632); Des Moines, IA
Feb 12, 2019; 7:00 pm, ESPN+		at Southern Illinois	W 72–69	19–7 (8–5)	SIU Arena (4,075); Carbondale, IL
Feb 16, 2019; 2:00 pm, MC22/ESPN3		Valparaiso	W 84–79	20–7 (9–5)	Knapp Center (4,035); Des Moines, IA
Feb 19, 2019; 7:00 pm, ESPN+		Bradley	W 77–68	21–7 (10–5)	Knapp Center (3,061); Des Moines, IA
Feb 24, 2019; 3:00 pm, CBSSN		at Illinois State	L 60–67	21–8 (10–6)	Redbird Arena (4,985); Normal, IL
Feb 27, 2019; 7:00 pm, ESPN+		Indiana State	W 80–68	22–8 (11–6)	Knapp Center (4,023); Des Moines, IA
Mar 2, 2019; 3:00 pm, ESPN+		at Missouri State	W 73–62	23–8 (12–6)	JQH Arena (7,984); Springfield, MO
MVC tournament
Mar 8, 2019; 6:05 pm, MVC TV [ESPN+]	(2)	vs. (7) Illinois State; Quarterfinals	W 78–62	24–8	Enterprise Center; St. Louis, MO
Mar 9, 2019; 5:05 pm, CBSSN	(2)	vs. (6) Northern Iowa; Semifinals	L 58–60	24–9	Enterprise Center (7,884); St. Louis, MO
CollegeInsider.com Postseason tournament
Mar 22, 2019*; 7:30 pm, watchcit.com		at Southern Utah; First round	L 73–80 ^{OT}	24–10	America First Events Center (2,714); Cedar City, UT
*Non-conference game. ^{#}Rankings from AP Poll. (#) Tournament seedings in parentheses. All times are in Central Time.
