= 2018–19 Illinois State Redbirds men's basketball team =

American college basketball season

2018–19 Illinois State Redbirds men's basketball
- Conference: Missouri Valley Conference
- Record: 17–16 (9–9 MVC)
- Head coach: Dan Muller (7th season)
- Assistant coaches: Brian Reese; Brendan Mullins; Chris Duhon
- Home arena: Doug Collins Court at Redbird Arena

2018–19 Missouri Valley Conference men's basketball standings
	Conf.				Overall
Team	W		L	PCT	W		L	PCT
Loyola Chicago	12	–	6	.667	20	–	14	.588
Drake	12	–	6	.667	24	–	10	.706
Southern Illinois	10	–	8	.556	17	–	15	.531
Missouri State	10	–	8	.556	16	–	16	.500
Bradley †	9	–	9	.500	20	–	15	.571
Northern Iowa	9	–	9	.500	16	–	18	.471
Illinois State	9	–	9	.500	17	–	16	.515
Indiana State	7	–	11	.389	15	–	16	.484
Valparaiso	7	–	11	.389	15	–	18	.455
Evansville	5	–	13	.278	11	–	21	.344
† 2019 MVC tournament winner

The 2018–19 Illinois State Redbirds men's basketball team represented Illinois State University during the 2018–19 NCAA Division I men's basketball season. The Redbirds, led by seventh-year head coach Dan Muller, played their home games at Redbird Arena in Normal, Illinois as a member of the Missouri Valley Conference. They finished the season 17–16, 9–9 in conference play, to finish in a tie for the fifth place. As the number seven seed in the MVC tournament, they defeated Evansville in the opening round and were beaten by Drake in the quarterfinal round.

== Previous season ==
The Redbrids finished the 2017–18 NCAA Division I men's basketball season 18–15, 10–8 in MVC play, to finish in a tie for third place. They were the number three seed and defeated Missouri State in their quarterfinal game and Southern Illinois in their semifinal game to advance to the championship game of the MVC tournament where they lost to Loyola–Chicago.

== Offseason ==
=== Departures ===
Name	#	Pos.	Height	Weight	Year	Hometown	Comment
Jerron Martin	24	G	6'0"	175	RS Sr	Prince George's County, MD	Graduation
Daouda Ndiaye	4	C	7'0"	215	Jr	Dakar, Senegal	Southern Utah
Christian Romine	34	F	6'9"	220	RS So	Mahomet, IL	Personal reasons
Madison Williams	25	G	6'3"	170	So	Augusta, GA	Retired due to injury
Elijah Clarance	1	G	6'4"	190	Fr	Malmö, Sweden	Skyliners Frankfurt

=== Arrivals ===
==== Transfers ====
Name	Pos.	Height	Weight	Year	Hometown	Prior School
Jaycee Hillsman	G	6'6"	213	Sr	Champaign, IL	San Jose State
Lijah Donnelly	G	6'2"	170	Jr	Bloomington, IL	Illinois–Springfield
Josh Jefferson	G	6'2"	173	Jr	New Albany, IN	Lake Land College
Keith Fisher III	F	6'8"	215	RS So	Los Angeles, CA	San Jose State
Dedric Boyd	G	6'4"	175	So	Brownsville, TN	Eastern Kentucky

==== Recruiting class ====
College recruiting information
Name	Hometown	School	Height	Weight	Commit date
Rey Idowu; PF	Melbourne, FL	Clearwater Academy International	6 ft 9 in (2.06 m)	230 lb (100 kg)	Sep 16, 2017
Rey Idowu; PF	Recruit ratings: Scout: Rivals: 247Sports: (NR)				
Abdou Ndiaye; PF	Louga, Senegal	The Nation Christian Academy	6 ft 9 in (2.06 m)	190 lb (86 kg)	Apr 16, 2018
Abdou Ndiaye; PF	Recruit ratings: Scout: Rivals: 247Sports: (NR)				
Overall recruit ranking:
Note: In many cases, Scout, Rivals, 247Sports, On3, and ESPN may conflict in their listings of height and weight.; In these cases, the average was taken. ESPN grades are on a 100-point scale.; Sources: "2018 Team Ranking". Rivals.

== Roster ==
2018–19 Illinois State Redbirds men's basketball team
Players
Coaches

Pos.	#	Name	Height	Weight	Year	Previous school	Hometown
G	0	Isaac Gassman	6 ft 5 in (1.96 m)	180 lb (82 kg)	RS So	Ottawa Township High School	Utica, IL
G	2	Zach Copeland	6 ft 4 in (1.93 m)	185 lb (84 kg)	Jr	Berkeley High School; City College of San Francisco	Oakland, CA
G	3	Keyshawn Evans	6 ft 0 in (1.83 m)	180 lb (82 kg)	Sr	Sagemont School	Plantation, FL
F	4	Abdou Ndaiye	6 ft 9 in (2.06 m)	190 lb (86 kg)	Fr	The Nation Christian Academy	Louga, Senegal
G	5	Matt Hein	6 ft 3 in (1.91 m)	185 lb (84 kg)	RS Jr	Windermere Preparatory School	Windermere, FL
F	10	Phil Fayne	6 ft 9 in (2.06 m)	220 lb (100 kg)	Sr	Franklin High School; Western Nebraska Community College	Elk Grove, CA
G	11	Josh Jefferson	6 ft 2 in (1.88 m)	190 lb (86 kg)	Jr	New Albany High School; Lake Land College	New Albany, IN
F	13	Rey Idowu	6 ft 9 in (2.06 m)	240 lb (109 kg)	Fr	Clearwater Academy	Melbourne, FL
F	14	Keith Fisher III (I)	6 ft 8 in (2.03 m)	215 lb (98 kg)	RS So	Westchester Enriched Sciences Magnets; San Jose State	Los Angeles, CA
G	15	Lijah Donnelly (I,W)	6 ft 2 in (1.88 m)	170 lb (77 kg)	Jr	Bloomington High School; Illinois–Springfield	Bloomington, IL
G	22	Matt Chastain	6 ft 6 in (1.98 m)	190 lb (86 kg)	RS So	Le Roy High School; Loyola–Chicago	Le Roy, IL
G	23	William Tinsley	6 ft 6 in (1.98 m)	195 lb (88 kg)	Sr	Ridgeview High School	Colfax, IL
G	25	Jaycee Hillsman (I)	6 ft 6 in (1.98 m)	213 lb (97 kg)	Sr	Simeon Career Academy; San Jose State	Champaign, IL
G	30	Dedric Boyd (I)	6 ft 4 in (1.93 m)	175 lb (79 kg)	So	Haywood High School; Eastern Kentucky	Brownsville, TN
F	32	Taylor Bruninga	6 ft 8 in (2.03 m)	220 lb (100 kg)	So	Illini Bluffs High School	Mapleton, IL
F	52	Milik Yarbrough	6 ft 6 in (1.98 m)	215 lb (98 kg)	RS Sr	Zion-Benton Township High School; Saint Louis	Zion, IL

Head coach

- Dan Muller (Illinois State)

Assistant coach(es)

- Brian Reese (North Carolina)
- Brendan Mullins (Saint Michael's)
- Chris Duhon (Duke)

Legend

- (C) Team captain
- (S) Suspended
- (I) Ineligible
- (W) Walk-on
- Injured
- Current redshirt

Roster
Last update: January 19, 2020

== Schedule and results ==
Date time, TV	Rank^{#}	Opponent^{#}	Result	Record	High points	High rebounds	High assists	Site (attendance) city, state
Exhibition Season
October 30, 2018*; 7:00 pm		Lewis	W 80–58		20 – Fayne	12 – Fayne	6 – Hein	Doug Collins Court at Redbird Arena; Normal, IL
November 3, 2018*; 12:00 pm		Augustana (Illinois)	W 82–74		23 – Fayne	11 – Tinsley	5 – Yarbrough	Doug Collins Court at Redbird Arena (4,218); Normal, IL
Non-Conference Regular Season
November 6, 2018*; 6:00 pm, NBCSCH		Florida Gulf Coast	W 74–66	1–0	17 – Yarbrough, Fayne, Jefferson	11 – Fayne	5 – Copeland	Doug Collins Court at Redbird Arena (4,764); Normal, IL
November 10, 2018*; 7:00 pm, ESPN+		at Belmont	L 89–100	1–1	23 – Fayne	6 – Tinsley	5 – Copeland	Curb Event Center (3,086); Nashville, TN
November 13, 2018*; 7:00 pm, NBCSCH		Chicago State; Cayman Islands Classic campus site	W 75–71	2–1	25 – Yarbrough	9 – Yarbrough	7 – Yarbrough	Doug Collins Court at Redbird Arena (4,320); Normal, IL
November 19, 2018*; 12:30 pm, Stadium		vs. Georgia; Cayman Islands Classic quarterfinal	L 68–80	2–2	20 – Yarbrough	8 – Yarbrough	4 – Yarbrough	John Gray Gymnasium (1,180); George Town, Cayman Islands
November 20, 2018*; 10:00 am, Stadium		vs. Akron; Cayman Islands Classic consolation semifinal	W 73–68	3–2	19 – Jefferson	16 – Yarbrough	6 – Copeland	John Gray Gymnasium (667); George Town, Cayman Islands
November 21, 2018*; 12:30 pm, Stadium		vs. Boise State; Cayman Islands Classic consolation final	W 73–70	4–2	28 – Yarbrough	8 – Yarbrough	6 – Yarbrough	John Gray Gymnasium (525); George Town, Cayman Islands
November 24, 2018*; 2:00 pm, ESPN3		Lindenwood	W 79–62	5–2	15 – Copeland	9 – Tinsley	6 – Yarbrough, Evans	Doug Collins Court at Redbird Arena (3,737); Normal, IL
November 28, 2018*; 7:00 pm, ESPN+		BYU	W 92–89 ^{OT}	6–2	20 – Fayne	10 – Fayne	7 – Copeland	Doug Collins Court at Redbird Arena (6,187); Normal, IL
December 1, 2018*; 2:00 pm, ESPN+		San Diego State; Mountain West– Missouri Valley Challenge	L 65–75	6–3	16 – Yarbrough, Fayne	13 – Yarbrough	2 – Yarbrough, Evans	Doug Collins Court at Redbird Arena (6,245); Normal, IL
December 5, 2018*; 6:00 pm, NBCSCH		at UIC	L 75–94	6–4	30 – Yarbrough	6 – Yarbrough, Jefferson	5 – Jefferson	Credit Union 1 Arena (2,197); Chicago, IL
December 8, 2018*; 7:00 pm, NBCSCH		Ole Miss	L 74–81	6–5	19 – Yarbrough	11 – Fayne	6 – Yarbrough	Doug Collins Court at Redbird Arena (6,598); Normal, IL
December 16, 2018*; 1:00 pm, ESPN+		Cleveland State	W 88–77 ^{OT}	7–5	30 – Fayne	9 – Fayne	5 – Yarbrough, Copeland	Doug Collins Court at Redbird Arena (4,225); Normal, IL
December 21, 2018*; 6:00 pm, ESPN3		at UCF	L 56–77	7–6	10 – Evans, Fayne	6 – Fayne	3 – Copeland	CFE Arena (3,385); Orlando, FL
Missouri Valley Conference Regular Season
January 2, 2019; 7:00 pm, ESPN+		at Valparaiso	L 56–58	7–7 (0–1)	21 – Copeland	9 – Chastain	3 – Evans, Copeland	Athletics–Recreation Center (3,818); Valparaiso, IN
January 5, 2019; 3:00 pm, MVC Network (FSIN/FSKC/FSMW/NBCSCH)		Evansville	W 58–46	8–7 (1–1)	20 – Fayne	12 – Yarbrough	7 – Yarbrough	Doug Collins Court at Redbird Arena (5,643); Normal, IL
January 8, 2019; 7:00 pm, NBCSCH		Northern Iowa	W 70–69	9–7 (2–1)	23 – Yarbrough	8 – Yarbrough	4 – Copeland	Doug Collins Court at Redbird Arena (4,107); Normal, IL
January 12, 2019; 1:00 pm, ESPN2		at Loyola–Chicago	L 64–67	9–8 (2–2)	19 – Yarbrough	8 – Yarbrough	3 – Yarbrough	Joseph J. Gentile Arena (4,513); Chicago, IL
January 15, 2019; 6:00 pm, CBSSN		Southern Illinois	W 59–58	10–8 (3–2)	14 – Copeland	8 – Fayne	3 – Evans, Copeland	Doug Collins Court at Redbird Arena (4,588); Normal, IL
January 19, 2019; 1:00 pm, ESPN+		at Evansville	W 78–70	11–8 (4–2)	27 – Yarbrough	8 – Yarbrough	7 – Copeland	Ford Center (5,731); Evansville, IN
January 23, 2019; 6:00 pm, MVC Network		at Bradley; I–74 Rivalry	L 68–85	11–9 (4–3)	25 – Yarbrough	6 – Fayne	5 – Copeland	Carver Arena (7,122); Peoria, IL
January 27, 2019; 1:00 pm, CBSSN		Indiana State	W 76–62	12–9 (5–3)	26 – Fayne	6 – Chastain	5 – Yarbrough	Doug Collins Court at Redbird Arena (5,141); Normal, IL
January 30, 2019; 7:00 pm, ESPN+		at Drake	W 69–55	13–9 (6–3)	22 – Fayne	9 – Yarbrough	5 – Yarbrough	The Knapp Center (3,511); Des Moines, IA
February 2, 2019; 9:00 pm, ESPN2		Loyola–Chicago	W 65–57	14–9 (7–3)	21 – Yarbrough	6 – Fayne	3 – Evans	Doug Collins Court at Redbird Arena (8,107); Normal, IL
February 5, 2019; 7:00 pm, ESPN+		Valparaiso	L 53–69	14–10 (7–4)	17 – Copeland	5 – Yarbrough	3 – Copeland	Doug Collins Court at Redbird Arena (4,662); Normal, IL
February 10, 2019; 3:00 pm, ESPN3		at Missouri State	L 65–66	14–11 (7–5)	22 – Fayne	6 – Yarbrough, Fayne	3 – Yarbrough, Copeland	JQH Arena (6,507); Springfield, MO
February 13, 2019; 7:00 pm, ESPN+		at Northern Iowa	L 64–77	14–12 (7–6)	21 – Fayne	9 – Tinsley	4 – Evans	McLeod Center (3,364); Cedar Falls, IA
February 16, 2019; 7:00 pm, ESPN2		Bradley; I–74 Rivalry	L 59–65	14–13 (7–7)	20 – Yarbrough	11 – Fayne	5 – Chastain	Doug Collins Court at Redbird Arena (9,011); Normal, IL
February 20, 2019; 6:00 pm, ESPN+		at Indiana State	L 50–73	14–14 (7–8)	16 – Fayne	5 – Fayne, Tinsley	5 – Copeland	Hulman Center (3,253); Terre Haute, IN
February 24, 2019; 1:00 pm, CBSSN		Drake	W 67–60	15–14 (8–8)	21 – Yarbrough	9 – Fayne	4 – Yarbrough	Doug Collins Court at Redbird Arena (4,985); Normal, IL
February 27, 2019; 6:00 pm, MVC Network		Missouri State	W 65–57	16–14 (9–8)	28 – Yarbrough	9 – Yarbrough	3 – Yarbrough	Doug Collins Court at Redbird Arena (4,468); Normal, IL
March 2, 2019; 1:00 pm, CBSSN		Southern Illinois	L 63–72	16–15 (9–9)	21 – Fayne	7 – Chastain	2 – Evans, Chastain	SIU Arena (4,599); Carbondale, IL
State Farm Missouri Valley Conference {MVC} tournament
March 7, 2019*; 8:30 pm, MVC Network/ESPN+	(7)	vs. (10) Evansville; Opening Round	W 65–60	17–15	18 – Yarbrough	10 – Fayne	2 – Evans, Copeland	Enterprise Center (5,004); St. Louis, MO
March 8, 2019*; 6:00 pm, MVC Network/ESPN+	(7)	vs. (2) Drake; Quarterfinal	L 62–78	17–16	18 – Fayne	7 – Yarbrough	3 – Yarbrough, Copeland	Enterprise Center (7,396); St. Louis, MO
*Non-conference game. ^{#}Rankings from AP Poll. (#) Tournament seedings in parentheses. All times are in Central Standard Time.
