= 2018–19 Indiana State Sycamores men's basketball team =

American college basketball season

2018–19 Indiana State Sycamores men's basketball
- Conference: Missouri Valley Conference
- Record: 15–16 (7–11 MVC)
- Head coach: Greg Lansing (9th season)
- Assistant coaches: Marcus Belcher; Terry Parker; Brett Carey
- Home arena: Hulman Center

2018–19 Missouri Valley Conference men's basketball standings
	Conf.				Overall
Team	W		L	PCT	W		L	PCT
Loyola Chicago	12	–	6	.667	20	–	14	.588
Drake	12	–	6	.667	24	–	10	.706
Southern Illinois	10	–	8	.556	17	–	15	.531
Missouri State	10	–	8	.556	16	–	16	.500
Bradley †	9	–	9	.500	20	–	15	.571
Northern Iowa	9	–	9	.500	16	–	18	.471
Illinois State	9	–	9	.500	17	–	16	.515
Indiana State	7	–	11	.389	15	–	16	.484
Valparaiso	7	–	11	.389	15	–	18	.455
Evansville	5	–	13	.278	11	–	21	.344
† 2019 MVC tournament winner

The 2018–19 Indiana State Sycamores basketball team represented Indiana State University during the 2018–19 NCAA Division I men's basketball season. The Sycamores, led by ninth-year head coach Greg Lansing, played their home games at the Hulman Center in Terre Haute, Indiana as members of the Missouri Valley Conference. They finished the season 15–16, 7–11 in MVC play to finish in a tie for eighth place. As the No. 8 seed in the MVC tournament, they lost to Valparaiso in the first round.

ISU coach Greg Lansing began the season needing two wins during the season to surpass his mentor (Royce Waltman) on the ISU Coaching Leaderboard. Waltman had 134 wins. Lansing passed Waltman following the Sycamores victory over the McKendree Bearcats and is currently second (148) in wins at Indiana State; the leader Duane Klueh has 182. Junior Guard Jordan Barnes became the 39th member of the ISU 1,000-pt Club.

== Previous season ==
The Sycamores finished the 2017–18 season 13–18, 8–10 in MVC play to finish in sixth place. They lost in the quarterfinals of the MVC tournament to Illinois State.

== Offseason ==
=== Departures ===
Name	Number	Pos.	Height	Weight	Year	Hometown	Reason for departure
Demonte Ojinnaka	1	G	6'5"	212	Senior	Silver Spring, MD	Graduated
Trey Knight III	3	G	6'4"	180	RS Sophomore	Cedar Park, TX	Transferred to Texas A&M–Kingsville
Brenton Scott	4	G	6'1"	190	RS Senior	Fort Wayne, IN	Graduated
Ethan Claycomb	10	F	6'7"	194	RS Freshman	Vincennes, IN	Walk-on; transferred to Bellarmine
Matt Deady	24	G	6'5"	208	RS Freshman	Terre Haute, IN	Walk-on; left the team for personal reasons
Qiydar Davis	25	G	6'5"	209	RS Senior	Atlanta, GA	Graduated
Brandon Murphy	34	C	6'7"	270	Senior	Montgomery, AL	Graduated

=== Incoming transfers ===
Name	Number	Pos.	Height	Weight	Year	Hometown	Previous School
Allante Holston	1	G	6'7"	190	Senior	Capitol Heights, MD	Transferred from North Texas. Will be eligible to play immediately since Holston graduated from North Texas.
Cameron Bacote	3	G	6'3"	170	Sophomore	Hampton, VA	Transferred from Maryland Eastern Shore. Under NCAA transfer rules, Bacote will have to sit out for the 2018–19 season. Will have three years of remaining eligibility.

=== 2018 recruiting class ===
College recruiting
Name	Hometown	School	Height	Weight	Commit date
Deavion Washington; SG	Terre Haute, IN	Terre Haute South Vigo High School	6 ft 3 in (1.91 m)	170 lb (77 kg)	Jun 21, 2016
Deavion Washington; SG	Recruit ratings: Scout: Rivals: 247Sports: (NR)				
Blake Brinkmeyer; PF	West Des Moines, IA	Valley High School	6 ft 8 in (2.03 m)	205 lb (93 kg)	Aug 1, 2017
Blake Brinkmeyer; PF	Recruit ratings: Scout: Rivals: (NR)				
Overall recruit ranking:
Note: In many cases, Scout, Rivals, 247Sports, On3, and ESPN may conflict in their listings of height and weight.; In these cases, the average was taken. ESPN grades are on a 100-point scale.; Sources: "2018 Team Ranking". Rivals.

=== 2019 recruiting class ===
College recruiting (2018)
Name	Hometown	School	Height	Weight	Commit date
Jared Hankins; SG	Indianapolis, IN	Lawrence North High School	6 ft 4 in (1.93 m)	190 lb (86 kg)	
Jared Hankins; SG	Recruit ratings: Scout: Rivals: 247Sports: (NR)				
Treauhn Williams; PF	Reynoldsburg, OH	Woodstock Academy	6 ft 7 in (2.01 m)	N/A	Sep 22, 2018
Treauhn Williams; PF	Recruit ratings: Scout: Rivals: 247Sports: (NR)				
Cobie Barnes; SF	Floyds Knobs, IN	Floyd Central High School	6 ft 5 in (1.96 m)	200 lb (91 kg)	Oct 11, 2017
Cobie Barnes; SF	Recruit ratings: Scout: Rivals: 247Sports: (NR)				
Overall recruit ranking:
Note: In many cases, Scout, Rivals, 247Sports, On3, and ESPN may conflict in their listings of height and weight.; In these cases, the average was taken. ESPN grades are on a 100-point scale.; Sources: "2019 Team Ranking". Rivals.

== Roster ==
2018–19 Indiana State Sycamores men's basketball team
Players
Coaches

Pos.	#	Name	Height	Weight	Year	Previous school	Hometown
G	1	Allante Holston	6 ft 7 in (2.01 m)	190 lb (86 kg)	Sr	Clinton Christian School; North Texas	Capitol Heights, MD
G	2	Jordan Barnes	5 ft 11 in (1.8 m)	152 lb (69 kg)	Jr	Christian Brothers HS	St. Louis, MO
G	3	Cam Bacote (redshirt)	6 ft 3 in (1.91 m)	170 lb (77 kg)	So	Bethel HS; Maryland Eastern Shore	Hampton, VA
G	4	Cooper Neese	6 ft 4 in (1.93 m)	190 lb (86 kg)	RS Fr	Cloverdale HS	Cloverdale, IN
F/C	5	Bronson Kessinger	6 ft 8 in (2.03 m)	222 lb (101 kg)	RS Jr	Corydon Central HS	Corydon, IN
G	10	Christian Williams	6 ft 5 in (1.96 m)	200 lb (91 kg)	RS Jr	St. Teresa HS; Iowa	Decatur, IL
G	11	Tyreke Key	6 ft 2 in (1.88 m)	201 lb (91 kg)	So	Clay County HS	Celina, TN
G	12	Tyeshon Martin (W)	6 ft 0 in (1.83 m)	180 lb (82 kg)	RS Fr	New Rochelle HS	Yonkers, NY
G	13	Clayton Hughes	6 ft 6 in (1.98 m)	206 lb (93 kg)	So	University School/Hargrave Military	Jackson, TN
F/C	20	Daniel Huenermann	6 ft 11 in (2.11 m)	221 lb (100 kg)	So	Kantonsschule Am Burggraben	St. Gallen, Switzerland
G	23	De'Avion Washington	6 ft 3 in (1.91 m)	190 lb (86 kg)	Fr	Terre Haute South Vigo HS	Terre Haute, IN
F	35	Devin Thomas	6 ft 8 in (2.03 m)	220 lb (100 kg)	Sr	Richmond HS; Mineral Area College	Richmond, IN
F	40	Blake Brinkmeyer	6 ft 9 in (2.06 m)	205 lb (93 kg)	Fr	Valley HS	West Des Moines, IA
C	41	Emondre Richman	6 ft 9 in (2.06 m)	255 lb (116 kg)	Sr	Collinsville HS	Collinsville, IL

Head coach

- Greg Lansing (South Dakota)

Assistant coach(es)

- Marcus Belcher (Southern Illinois)
- Terry Parker (Louisiana Tech)
- Brett Carey (UNC Asheville)

Legend

- (C) Team captain
- (S) Suspended
- (I) Ineligible
- (W) Walk-on
- Injured
- Current redshirt

Roster

== Schedule and results ==
Date time, TV	Rank^{#}	Opponent^{#}	Result	Record	Site (attendance) city, state
Exhibition
Nov 1, 2018*; 7:00 pm		Rose-Hulman	W 77–44		Hulman Center (3,675); Terre Haute, IN
Non-conference regular season
Nov 6, 2018*; 7:00 pm, ESPN+		at Ball State	L 69–86	0–1	Worthen Arena (4,022); Muncie, IN
Nov 9, 2018*; 4:30 pm, ESPN3		at Green Bay	W 78–74	1–1	Resch Center (1,469); Green Bay, WI
Nov 14, 2018*; 7:00 pm, ESPN3		McKendree	W 80–63	2–1	Hulman Center (3,146); Terre Haute, IN
Nov 24, 2018*; 2:00 pm, ESPN+		Western Kentucky	W 63–54	3–1	Hulman Center (3,032); Terre Haute, IN
Nov 28, 2018*; 10:00 pm		at San Jose State; MW–MVC Challenge	W 86–57	4–1	Event Center Arena (1,523); San Jose, CA
Dec 1, 2018*; 2:00 pm, ESPN3		Wright State	W 69–63	5–1	Hulman Center (3,499); Terre Haute, IN
Dec 5, 2018*; 7:00 pm, ESPN+		North Texas	L 69–80	5–2	Hulman Center (3,113); Terre Haute, IN
Dec 8, 2018*; 1:00 pm, ESPN+		Truman State	W 77–69	6–2	Hulman Center (3,466); Terre Haute, IN
Dec 16, 2018*; 5:00 pm, ESPNU		at TCU; Diamond Head Classic campus site game	L 70–90	6–3	Schollmaier Arena (6,431); Fort Worth, TX
Dec 22, 2018*; 4:00 pm, ESPNU		vs. Colorado; Diamond Head Classic quarterfinals	W 72–67	7–3	Stan Sheriff Center; Honolulu, HI
Dec 23, 2018*; 4:30 pm, ESPN2		vs. UNLV; Diamond Head Classic semifinals	W 84–79	8–3	Stan Sheriff Center; Honolulu, HI
Dec 25, 2018*; 9:00 pm, ESPN2		vs. TCU; Diamond Head Classic championship game	L 69–83	8–4	Stan Sheriff Center (5,752); Honolulu, HI
Missouri Valley regular season
Jan 2, 2019; 9:00 pm, FSMW/NBCSCH		at Loyola–Chicago	L 44–79	8–5 (0–1)	Joseph J. Gentile Arena (3,112); Chicago, IL
Jan 5, 2019; 2:00 pm, ESPN3		Bradley	W 65–60	9–5 (1–1)	Hulman Center (4,117); Terre Haute, IN
Jan 8, 2019; 7:00 pm, ESPN3		Missouri State	L 57–72	9–6 (1–2)	Hulman Center (3,420); Terre Haute, IN
Jan 12, 2019; 2:00 pm, ESPN3		at Evansville	W 72–66 ^{OT}	10–6 (2–2)	Ford Center (6,419); Evansville, IN
Jan 16, 2019; 8:00 pm, ESPN3		at Northern Iowa	L 64–69	10–7 (2–3)	McLeod Center (3,457); Cedar Falls, IA
Jan 19, 2019; 2:00 pm, ESPNU		Loyola–Chicago	L 67–75	10–8 (2–4)	Hulman Center (10,200); Terre Haute, IN
Jan 23, 2019; 7:00 pm, ESPN3		Valparaiso	W 70–53	11–8 (3–4)	Hulman Center (3,460); Valparaiso, IN
Jan 27, 2019; 2:00 pm, CBSSN		at Illinois State	L 62–76	11–9 (3–5)	Redbird Arena (5,141); Normal, IL
Jan 30, 2019; 9:00 pm, FSMW/NBCSCH		at Southern Illinois	L 73–88	11–10 (3–6)	SIU Arena (8,284); Carbondale, IL
Feb 2, 2019; 2:00 pm, ESPN3		Drake	L 62–68	11–11 (3–7)	Hulman Center (3,529); Terre Haute, IN
Feb 6, 2019; 7:00 pm, ESPN3		Evansville	W 85–62	12–11 (4–7)	Hulman Center (3,469); Terre Haute, IN
Feb 9, 2019; 8:00 pm, ESPN3		at Bradley	L 67–96	12–12 (4–8)	Carver Arena (5,805); Peoria, IL
Feb 13, 2019; 8:00 pm, ESPN3		at Valparaiso	W 87–82 ^{OT}	13–12 (5–8)	Athletics–Recreation Center (3,014); Valparaiso, IN
Feb 16, 2019; 12:00 pm, FSMW/NBCSCH		Southern Illinois	L 57–79	13–13 (5–9)	Hulman Center (3,997); Terre Haute, IN
Feb 20, 2019; 7:00 pm, ESPN3		Illinois State	W 73–50	14–13 (6–9)	Hulman Center (3,253); Valparaiso, IN
Feb 23, 2019; 2:00 pm, ESPN3		at Missouri State	L 61–67	14–14 (6–10)	JQH Arena (5,788); Springfield, MO
Feb 27, 2019; 8:00 pm, ESPN3		at Drake	L 68–80	14–15 (6–11)	Knapp Center (4,023); Des Moines, IA
Mar 2, 2019; TBA		Northern Iowa	W 71–54	15–15 (7–11)	Hulman Center (3,764); Terre Haute, IN
Missouri Valley tournament
Mar 7, 2019	(8)	vs. (9) Valparaiso	L 55-77	15-16 (7-11)	Enterprise Center; St. Louis, MO
*Non-conference game. ^{#}Rankings from AP Poll. (#) Tournament seedings in parentheses. All times are in Eastern Time.
