= 2018–19 Bradley Braves men's basketball team =

American college basketball season

2018–19 Bradley Braves men's basketball

Missouri Valley Tournament champions Cancún Challenge Riviera Division champions

NCAA tournament, First Round
- Conference: Missouri Valley Conference
- Record: 20–15 (9–9 MVC)
- Head coach: Brian Wardle (4th season)
- Assistant coaches: Drew Adams; Mike Bargen; Jimmie Foster
- Home arena: Carver Arena

2018–19 Missouri Valley Conference men's basketball standings
	Conf.				Overall
Team	W		L	PCT	W		L	PCT
Loyola Chicago	12	–	6	.667	20	–	14	.588
Drake	12	–	6	.667	24	–	10	.706
Southern Illinois	10	–	8	.556	17	–	15	.531
Missouri State	10	–	8	.556	16	–	16	.500
Bradley †	9	–	9	.500	20	–	15	.571
Northern Iowa	9	–	9	.500	16	–	18	.471
Illinois State	9	–	9	.500	17	–	16	.515
Indiana State	7	–	11	.389	15	–	16	.484
Valparaiso	7	–	11	.389	15	–	18	.455
Evansville	5	–	13	.278	11	–	21	.344
† 2019 MVC tournament winner

The 2018–19 Bradley Braves men's basketball team represented Bradley University during the 2018–19 NCAA Division I men's basketball season. The Braves, led by fourth-year head coach Brian Wardle, played their home games at Carver Arena in Peoria, Illinois as members of the Missouri Valley Conference. They finished the season 20–15, 9–9 in MVC play to finish in a three-way tie for fifth place. As the No. 5 seed in the MVC tournament, they defeated Missouri State, Loyola, and Northern Iowa to win the tournament championship. As a result, they received the conference's automatic bid to the NCAA tournament as the No. 15 seed in the East region. There they lost to No. 2-seeded Michigan State in the first round.

== Previous season ==
The Braves finished the 2017–18 season 20–13, 9–9 in MVC play to finish in fifth place. They defeated Drake in the first round of the MVC tournament before losing to Loyola–Chicago in the semifinals.

== Offseason ==
=== Departures ===
Name	Number	Pos.	Height	Weight	Year	Hometown	Reason for departure
Donte Thomas	1	F	6'7"	225	Senior	Calumet City, IL	Graduated
Ryan Stipanovich	21	G/F	6'7"	210	Freshman	St. Louis, MO	Left the team for personal reasons
JoJo McGlaston	24	G	6'5"	205	RS Senior	Dublin, CA	Graduated
Chudier Bile	**	G/F	6'6"	200	Junior	Denver, Colorado	Stayed one Summer Session then transferred to Northwestern State
Callum Barker	30	F	6'9"	235	Junior	Hobart, Australia	Graduate transferred to Missouri Baptist

=== 2018 recruiting class ===
College recruiting
Name	Hometown	School	Height	Weight	Commit date
Armon Brummett; SG	Decatur, IL	Douglas MacArthur High School	6 ft 4 in (1.93 m)	185 lb (84 kg)	Jan 23, 2018
Armon Brummett; SG	Recruit ratings: Scout: Rivals: 247Sports: (0)				
Ja'Shon Henry; SF	Saskatoon, SK	Athol Murray College of Notre Dame Prep, Wilcox, SK	6 ft 6 in (1.98 m)	225 lb (102 kg)	Jun 1, 2018
Ja'Shon Henry; SF	Recruit ratings: Scout: Rivals: 247Sports: (0)				
Aristide Boya; C	Douala, Cameroon	Scotland Campus Prep, Scotland, PA	6 ft 10 in (2.08 m)	205 lb (93 kg)	Sep 5, 2017
Aristide Boya; C	Recruit ratings: Scout: Rivals: 247Sports: (0)				
Overall recruit ranking: Scout: – Rivals: –
Note: In many cases, Scout, Rivals, 247Sports, On3, and ESPN may conflict in their listings of height and weight.; In these cases, the average was taken. ESPN grades are on a 100-point scale.; Sources: "Bradley Commit List for 2018". Rivals.; "Men's Basketball Recruiting". Scout.; "ESPN – Bradley Braves Basketball Recruiting 2018". ESPN.; "Scout.com Team Recruiting Rankings". Scout.; "2018 Team Ranking". Rivals.

=== 2019 recruiting class ===
College recruiting
Name	Hometown	School	Height	Weight	Commit date
Stephan Gabriel; SF	Maplewood, NJ	Columbia HS; Hillcrest Prep (Phoenix, AZ); Veritas Prep (Santa Fe Springs, CA); NTSI Prep (Orlando, FL)	6 ft 7 in (2.01 m)	215 lb (98 kg)	Sep 14, 2018
Stephan Gabriel; SF	Recruit ratings: Scout: Rivals: 247Sports: (NR)				
JaMir Price; SG	Rock Island, IL	Rock Island High School	6 ft 2 in (1.88 m)	170 lb (77 kg)	09/26/2018 (to spend a year at prep school and enter Bradley in fall of 2020)
JaMir Price; SG	Recruit ratings: Scout: Rivals: 247Sports: (NR)				
Ville Tahvanainen; PG/SG	Helsinki, Finland	amateur team- Helsinki Basketball Academy (HBA-Marsky 1st Division)	6 ft 4 in (1.93 m)	210 lb (95 kg)	Sep 29, 2018
Ville Tahvanainen; PG/SG	Recruit ratings: Scout: Rivals: 247Sports: (NR)				
Antonio Thomas; PG	Memphis, TN	Memphis East High School	6 ft 2 in (1.88 m)	170 lb (77 kg)	Sep 17, 2018
Antonio Thomas; PG	Recruit ratings: Scout: Rivals: 247Sports: (NR)				
Rienk Mast; PF	Groningen, the Netherlands	amateur team- Donar, Dutch Basketball League (DBL - Eredivisie)	6 ft 9 in (2.06 m)	215 lb (98 kg)	Jan 20, 2019
Rienk Mast; PF	Recruit ratings: Scout: Rivals: 247Sports: (NR)				
Danya Kingsby; PG/SG	Milwaukee, WI	Milwaukee Hamilton HS; Arlington Country Day (Jacksonville, FL); College of Southern Idaho; LSU transfer	6 ft 2 in (1.88 m)	180 lb (82 kg)	Mar 29, 2019
Danya Kingsby; PG/SG	Recruit ratings: Scout: Rivals: 247Sports: (NR)				
Overall recruit ranking: Scout: – Rivals: –
Note: In many cases, Scout, Rivals, 247Sports, On3, and ESPN may conflict in their listings of height and weight.; In these cases, the average was taken. ESPN grades are on a 100-point scale.; Sources: "Bradley Commit List for 2019". Rivals.; "Men's Basketball Recruiting". Scout.; "ESPN – Bradley Braves Basketball Recruiting 2019". ESPN.; "Scout.com Team Recruiting Rankings". Scout.; "2019 Team Ranking". Rivals.

== Roster ==
2018–19 Bradley Braves men's basketball team
Players
Coaches

Pos.	#	Name	Height	Weight	Year	Previous school	Hometown
C	1	Ari Boya	7 ft 1 in (2.16 m)	240 lb (109 kg)	Fr	Scotland Prep	Douala, Cameroon
G	2	Luqman Lundy	6 ft 3 in (1.91 m)	200 lb (91 kg)	Jr	Mays HS; Northern Oklahoma	Edgewater, NJ
G	3	Antoine Pittman	6 ft 3 in (1.91 m)	210 lb (95 kg)	RS Jr	Auburn HS	Rockford, IL
G	4	Armon Brummett	6 ft 4 in (1.93 m)	205 lb (93 kg)	Fr	MacArthur HS	Decatur, IL
G	5	Darrell Brown	5 ft 10 in (1.78 m)	190 lb (86 kg)	Jr	Germantown HS	Memphis, TN
F	10	Elijah Childs	6 ft 7 in (2.01 m)	225 lb (102 kg)	So	Lee's Summit West HS	Kansas City, MO
C	12	Koch Bar	6 ft 11 in (2.11 m)	225 lb (102 kg)	Jr	Arlington County Day School	Abyei, South Sudan
F	13	Luuk van Bree	6 ft 9 in (2.06 m)	225 lb (102 kg)	Sr	Canarias Academy	Venray, Netherlands
F	14	Peter Hanley	6 ft 7 in (2.01 m)	220 lb (100 kg)	Sr	Notre Dame HS	Peoria, IL
G/F	22	Ja'Shon Henry	6 ft 6 in (1.98 m)	225 lb (102 kg)	Fr	Athol Murray College of Notre Dame	Saskatoon, Saskatchewan
G	23	Dwayne Lautier-Ogunleye	6 ft 4 in (1.93 m)	210 lb (95 kg)	Sr	Bristol Academy	London, England
G	25	Nate Kennell	6 ft 6 in (1.98 m)	205 lb (93 kg)	Jr	Metamora Township HS	Metamora, IL
G	35	Jayden Hodgson	6 ft 3 in (1.91 m)	195 lb (88 kg)	Jr	Arlington County Day School	Gosford, Australia

Head coach

- Brian Wardle (Marquette)

Assistant coach(es)

- Drew Adams (Tennessee)
- Mike Bargen (Marquette)
- Jimmie Foster (South Dakota)

Legend

- (C) Team captain
- (S) Suspended
- (I) Ineligible
- (W) Walk-on
- Injured
- Current redshirt

Roster
Last update: August 29, 2018

== Schedule and results ==
Date time, TV	Rank^{#}	Opponent^{#}	Result	Record	Site (attendance) city, state
Exhibition
Nov 1, 2018*; 7:00 pm CT		Carroll (WI)	W 81–31		Carver Arena (4,386); Peoria, IL
Non-conference regular season
Nov 1, 2018*; 7:00 pm CT, ESPN+		UW–Parkside; Cancún Challenge campus site game	W 74–58	1–0	Carver Arena (4,610); Peoria, IL
Nov 10, 2018*; 1:00 pm CT, ESPN3		Southeast Missouri State	W 68–57	2–0	Carver Arena (5,181); Peoria, IL
Nov 14, 2018*; 7:00 pm CT, ESPN+		Jacksonville State; Cancún Challenge campus site game	W 74–65	3–0	Carver Arena (4,706); Peoria, IL
Nov 17, 2018*; 7:00 pm CT, ESPN3		at UIC	L 70–71	3–1	Credit Union 1 Arena (1,423); Chicago, IL
Nov 20, 2018*; 5:00 pm CT, CBSSN		vs. SMU; Cancún Challenge Riviera Bracket semifinal	W 75–62	4–1	Hard Rock Hotel Riviera Maya; Cancún, Mexico
Nov 21, 2018*; 7:30 pm CT, CBSSN		vs. Penn State; Cancún Challenge Riviera Bracket final	W 59–56	5–1	Hard Rock Hotel Riviera Maya (1,473); Cancún, Mexico
Nov 24, 2018*; 1:00 pm CT, ESPN3		Chicago State	W 86–70	6–1	Carver Arena (4,952); Peoria, IL
Nov 28, 2018*; 6:00 pm CT, ESPN+		at IUPUI	L 73-85	6–2	Indiana Farmers Coliseum (1,383); Indianapolis, IN
Dec 1, 2018*; 7:00 pm CT, ESPN+		New Mexico; MW–MVC Challenge	L 75-85	6–3	Carver Arena (5,494); Peoria, IL
Dec 4, 2018*; 6:30 pm CT		at Little Rock	W 68-62	7–3	Jack Stephens Center (1,388); Little Rock, AR
Dec 15, 2018*; 7:00 pm CT, ESPN+		Eastern Illinois	L 66-73	7–4	Carver Arena (5,186); Peoria, IL
Dec 18, 2018*; 6:30 pm CT, ESPN+		at Georgia Southern	L 74–79 ^{OT}	7–5	Hanner Fieldhouse (1,507); Statesboro, GA
Dec 22, 2018*; 1:00 pm CT, ESPN+		Southeastern Louisiana	W 63–60	8–5	Carver Arena (5,004); Peoria, IL
Missouri Valley Conference regular season
Jan 2, 2019; 7:00 pm CT, ESPN+		Northern Iowa	L 47–65	8–6 (0–1)	Carver Arena (5,252); Peoria, IL
Jan 5, 2019; 1:00 pm CT, ESPN3		at Indiana State	L 60–65	8–7 (0–2)	Hulman Center (4,117); Terre Haute, IN
Jan 8, 2019; 7:00 pm CT, ESPN+		at Valparaiso	L 50–61	8–8 (0–3)	Athletics–Recreation Center (2,535); Valparaiso, IN
Jan 12, 2019; 7:00 pm CT, ESPN+		Missouri State	L 64–69	8–9 (0–4)	Carver Arena (5,009); Peoria, IL
Jan 16, 2019; 7:00 pm CT, FSMW/NBCSCH		Drake	L 52–69	8–10 (0–5)	Carver Arena (4,654); Peoria, IL
Jan 20, 2019; 3:00 pm CT, ESPNU		at Southern Illinois	W 57–54	9–10 (1–5)	SIU Arena (4,327); Carbondale, IL
Jan 23, 2019; 6:00 pm CT, FSMW/NBCSCH		Illinois State	W 85–68	10–10 (2–5)	Carver Arena (7,122); Peoria, IL
Jan 26, 2019; 3:00 pm CT, FSMW/NBCSCH		at Missouri State	L 37–55	10–11 (2–6)	JQH Arena (5,215); Springfield, MO
Jan 30, 2019; 6:00 pm CT, ESPN+		at Evansville	W 81–73	11–11 (3–6)	Ford Center (5,019); Evansville, IN
Feb 2, 2019; 1:00 pm CT, CBSSN		Southern Illinois	L 68–72	11–12 (3–7)	Carver Arena (5,968); Peoria, IL
Feb 6, 2019; 7:00 pm CT, ESPN+		at Northern Iowa	W 79–71	12–12 (4–7)	McLeod Center (3,345); Cedar Falls, IA
Feb 9, 2019; 7:00 pm CT, ESPN+		Indiana State	W 96–67	13–12 (5–7)	Carver Arena (5,805); Peoria, IL
Feb 13, 2019; 7:00 pm CT, FSMW/NBCSCH		Loyola–Chicago	W 61–54	14–12 (6–7)	Carver Arena (5,490); Peoria, IL
Feb 16, 2019; 7:00 pm CT, ESPN2		at Illinois State	W 65–59	15–12 (7–7)	Redbird Arena (9,011); Normal, IL
Feb 19, 2019; 7:00 pm CT, ESPN+		at Drake	L 68–77	15–13 (7–8)	Knapp Center (3,061); Des Moines, IA
Feb 23, 2019; 1:00 pm CT, ESPN3		Evansville	W 63–61	16–13 (8–8)	Carver Arena (6,571); Peoria, IL
Feb 27, 2019; 7:00 pm CT, ESPN+		Valparaiso	W 67–42	17–13 (9–8)	Carver Arena (5,867); Peoria, IL
Mar 2, 2019; 5:00 pm CT, ESPN2		at Loyola–Chicago	L 68–81	17–14 (9–9)	Joseph J. Gentile Arena (4,963); Chicago, IL
Missouri Valley tournament
Mar 8, 2019; 2:35 pm CT, MVC-TV Network	(5)	vs. (4) Missouri State; Quarterfinals	W 61–58	18–14	Enterprise Center (6,774); St. Louis, MO
Mar 9, 2019; 2:35 pm CT, CBSSN	(5)	vs. (1) Loyola–Chicago; Semifinals	W 53–51	19–14	Enterprise Center (7,884); St. Louis, MO
Mar 10, 2019; 1:05 pm CT, CBS	(5)	vs. (6) Northern Iowa; Championship	W 57–54	20–14	Enterprise Center (8,108); St. Louis, MO
NCAA tournament
Mar 21, 2019*; 1:45 pm CT, CBS	(15 E)	vs. (2 E) No. 5 Michigan State; First Round	L 65–76	20–15	Wells Fargo Arena (16,512); Des Moines, IA
*Non-conference game. ^{#}Rankings from AP Poll. (#) Tournament seedings in parentheses. E=East. All times are in Central Time.
