= 2018–19 Evansville Purple Aces men's basketball team =

American college basketball season

2018–19 Evansville Purple Aces men's basketball
- Conference: Missouri Valley Conference
- Record: 11–21 (5–13 MVC)
- Head coach: Walter McCarty (1st season)
- Assistant coaches: Todd Lickliter; Matthew Graves; Terrence Commodore
- Home arena: Ford Center

2018–19 Missouri Valley Conference men's basketball standings
	Conf.				Overall
Team	W		L	PCT	W		L	PCT
Loyola Chicago	12	–	6	.667	20	–	14	.588
Drake	12	–	6	.667	24	–	10	.706
Southern Illinois	10	–	8	.556	17	–	15	.531
Missouri State	10	–	8	.556	16	–	16	.500
Bradley †	9	–	9	.500	20	–	15	.571
Northern Iowa	9	–	9	.500	16	–	18	.471
Illinois State	9	–	9	.500	17	–	16	.515
Indiana State	7	–	11	.389	15	–	16	.484
Valparaiso	7	–	11	.389	15	–	18	.455
Evansville	5	–	13	.278	11	–	21	.344
† 2019 MVC tournament winner

The 2018–19 Evansville Purple Aces men's basketball team represented the University of Evansville during the 2018–19 NCAA Division I men's basketball season. The Purple Aces, led by first-year head coach Walter McCarty, played their home games at the Ford Center as members of the Missouri Valley Conference. They finished the season 11–21 overall, 5–13 in MVC play, and finishing in last place. As the No. 10 seed in the MVC tournament, they lost to Illinois State in the first round.

== Previous season ==
The Purple Aces finished the 2017–18 season 17–15, 7–11 in MVC play to finish in a three-way tie for seventh place. As the No. 8 seed in the MVC tournament, they lost to Northern Iowa in the first round.

On March 13, 2018, Evansville fired head coach Marty Simmons. He finished at Evansville with an 11-year record of 184–175. On March 22, the school hired Boston Celtics assistant coach, former Kentucky player, and Evansville native Walter McCarty as head coach.

== Offseason ==
=== Departures ===
Name	Number	Pos.	Height	Weight	Year	Hometown	Reason for departure
Ryan Taylor	0	G	6'6"	195	RS Junior	Gary, IN	Graduate transferred to Northwestern
Solomon Hainna	5	G	6'6"	195	RS Senior	Inglewood, CA	Graduated
Dru Smith	12	G	6'3"	190	Sophomore	Evansville, IN	Transferred to Missouri
Dalen Traore	15	C	6'9"	230	Senior	Ivory Coast	Graduated
Duane Gibson	25	G	6'3"	195	RS Senior	Cleveland, OH	Graduated
Blake Simmons	50	G/F	6'5"	210	RS Senior	Newburgh, IN	Graduated

=== Incoming transfers ===
Name	Number	Pos.	Height	Weight	Year	Hometown	Notes
Artur Labinowicz	2	G	6'4"	190	Junior	Charlotte, NC	Transferred from Coastal Carolina. Under NCAA transfer rules, Labinowicz will have to sit out for the 2018–19 season. Will have two years of remaining eligibility.
Devan Straub	4	G	6'2"	190	RS Sophomore	Evansville, IN	Transferred from Indiana Kokomo. Will be eligible to play. Will join the team as a walk-on.
Shea Feehan	21	G	6'0"	155	RS Senior	Peoria, IL	Transferred from Eureka College. Will be eligible to play immediately since Feehan graduated from Eureka.
Sam Cunliffe	24	G	6'6"	200	Junior	Seattle, WA	Transferred from Kansas. Under NCAA transfer rules, Cunliffe will have to sit out for the 2018–19 season. Will have two years of remaining eligibility.

=== 2018 recruiting class ===
College recruiting information
Name	Hometown	School	Height	Weight	Commit date
DeAndre Williams #42 SF	Houston, TX	Klein Forest High School	6 ft 7 in (2.01 m)	195 lb (88 kg)	Apr 14, 2018
DeAndre Williams #42 SF	Recruit ratings: Scout: Rivals: 247Sports: (76)				
Will Becker #57 PF	Aurora, CO	Smokey Hill High School	6 ft 6 in (1.98 m)	190 lb (86 kg)	May 17, 2018
Will Becker #57 PF	Recruit ratings: Scout: Rivals: (65)				
Shamar Givance; PG	Toronto, ON	First Love Christian Academy	5 ft 10 in (1.78 m)	N/A	May 1, 2018
Shamar Givance; PG	Recruit ratings: Scout: Rivals: (NR)				
Jawaun Newton; SG	El Paso, TX	Burges High School	6 ft 3 in (1.91 m)	180 lb (82 kg)	May 8, 2018
Jawaun Newton; SG	Recruit ratings: Scout: Rivals: (NR)				
Overall recruit ranking:
Note: In many cases, Scout, Rivals, 247Sports, On3, and ESPN may conflict in their listings of height and weight.; In these cases, the average was taken. ESPN grades are on a 100-point scale.; Sources: "2018 Team Ranking". Rivals.

=== 2019 recruiting class ===
College recruiting information (2019)
Name	Hometown	School	Height	Weight	Commit date
Marcus Henderson; PG	Charlotte, NC	United Faith Christian Academy	6 ft 2 in (1.88 m)	N/A	Oct 10, 2018
Marcus Henderson; PG	Recruit ratings: Scout: Rivals: (NR)				
Overall recruit ranking:
Note: In many cases, Scout, Rivals, 247Sports, On3, and ESPN may conflict in their listings of height and weight.; In these cases, the average was taken. ESPN grades are on a 100-point scale.; Sources: "2019 Team Ranking". Rivals.

== Roster ==
2018–19 Evansville Purple Aces men's basketball team
Players
Coaches

Pos.	#	Name	Height	Weight	Year	Previous school	Hometown
G	1	Marty Hill	6 ft 5 in (1.96 m)	180 lb (82 kg)	Sr	Champlin Park; Northeast CC	Brooklyn Park, MN
G	2	Artur Labinowicz (redshirt)	6 ft 4 in (1.93 m)	190 lb (86 kg)	Jr	Combine Academy; Coastal Carolina	Charlotte, NC
G	3	Jawaun Newton	6 ft 3 in (1.91 m)	170 lb (77 kg)	Fr	Burges	El Paso, TX
G	4	Devan Straub (W)	6 ft 2 in (1.88 m)	190 lb (86 kg)	RS So	Mater Dei; IU Kokomo	Evansville, IN
G	5	Shamar Givance	5 ft 10 in (1.78 m)	155 lb (70 kg)	Fr	First Love Christian	Toronto, ON
F	10	Evan Kuhlman	6 ft 8 in (2.03 m)	220 lb (100 kg)	So	Lakota East	Liberty Township, OH
F	11	Will Becker	6 ft 9 in (2.06 m)	200 lb (91 kg)	Fr	Smoky Hill	Aurora, CO
G	12	Jared Chestnut (W)	6 ft 2 in (1.88 m)	180 lb (82 kg)	Sr	Harrison	Evansville, IN
F	13	DeAndre Williams	6 ft 9 in (2.06 m)	190 lb (86 kg)	Fr	Klein Forest	Houston, TX
F	14	Dainius Chatkevicius	6 ft 9 in (2.06 m)	240 lb (109 kg)	RS Sr	West Oaks Academy; Vincennes	Klaipėda, Lithuania
G	21	Shea Feehan	6 ft 0 in (1.83 m)	155 lb (70 kg)	RS Sr	Notre Dame; Eureka	Peoria, IL
G	24	Sam Cunliffe (redshirt)	6 ft 6 in (1.98 m)	200 lb (91 kg)	Jr	Rainier Beach; Kansas	Seattle, WA
G	30	Noah Frederking	6 ft 4 in (1.93 m)	210 lb (95 kg)	So	Okawville	Okawville, IL
G	33	K. J. Riley	6 ft 5 in (1.96 m)	180 lb (82 kg)	Jr	Standard of Excellence; Howard College	Bronx, NY
F	35	John Hall	6 ft 7 in (2.01 m)	215 lb (98 kg)	RS So	Standard of Excellence	Philadelphia, PA

Head coach

- Walter McCarty (Kentucky)

Assistant coach(es)

- Todd Lickliter (Butler)
- Matthew Graves (Butler)
- Terrence Commodore (Eastern Kentucky)

Legend

- (C) Team captain
- (S) Suspended
- (I) Ineligible
- (W) Walk-on
- Injured
- Current redshirt

Roster

== Schedule and results ==
Date time, TV	Rank^{#}	Opponent^{#}	Result	Record	Site (attendance) city, state
Exhibition
Nov 3, 2018*; 2:00 pm		New Mexico Highlands	W 83–61		Ford Center (4,460); Evansville, IN
Non-conference regular season
Nov 8, 2018*; 8:00 pm, BTN Plus		at Illinois; Maui on the Mainland	L 60–99	0–1	State Farm Center (11,755); Champaign, IL
Nov 10, 2018*; 4:00 pm, FSN		at Xavier; Maui on the Mainland	L 85–91	0–2	Cintas Center (10,533); Cincinnati, OH
Nov 15, 2018*; 6:00 pm, ESPN+		Kentucky Wesleyan; Maui on the Mainland	W 92–72	1–2	Ford Center (4,497); Evansville, IN
Nov 18, 2018*; 12:00 pm, ESPN+		Texas Southern; Maui on the Mainland	W 85–63	2–2	Ford Center (4,578); Evansville, IN
Nov 24, 2018*; 1:00 pm, ESPN3		at Ball State	L 72–82	2–3	Worthen Arena (3,224); Muncie, IN
Nov 28, 2018*; 6:00 pm, ESPN+		Wyoming; MW–MVC Challenge	W 86–78	3–3	Ford Center (4,709); Evansville, IN
Dec 1, 2018*; 6:00 pm, ESPN3		Albion	W 65–49	4–3	Ford Center (4,337); Evansville, IN
Dec 4, 2018*; 7:00 pm		at Arkansas State	L 77–87	4–4	First National Bank Arena (1,037); Jonesboro, AR
Dec 9, 2018*; 2:00 pm, ESPN+		Ball State	W 89–77	5–4	Ford Center (5,672); Evansville, IN
Dec 15, 2018*; 1:00 pm, ESPN3		Jacksonville State	L 50–55	5–5	Ford Center (4,814); Evansville, IN
Dec 18, 2018*; 7:00 pm, ESPN+		at Murray State	L 64–66	5–6	CFSB Center (4,099); Murray, KY
Dec 22, 2018*; 4:00 pm, ESPN+		Green Bay	W 80–75	6–6	Ford Center (5,011); Evansville, IN
Dec 30, 2018*; 12:00 pm, ESPN3		at Miami (OH)	L 67–70	6–7	Millett Hall (1,456); Oxford, OH
Missouri Valley regular season
Jan 2, 2019; 6:00 pm, ESPN+		Drake	W 82–77	7–7 (1–0)	Ford Center (5,503); Evansville, IN
Jan 5, 2019; 3:00 pm, FSMW/NBCSCH		at Illinois State	L 46–58	7–8 (1–1)	Redbird Arena (5,643); Normal, IN
Jan 8, 2019; 7:00 pm, CBSSN		Loyola–Chicago	W 67–48	8–8 (2–1)	Ford Center (5,049); Evansville, IN
Jan 12, 2019; 1:00 pm, ESPN3		Indiana State	L 66–72	8–9 (2–2)	Ford Center (6,419); Evansville, IN
Jan 16, 2019; 7:00 pm, ESPN+		at Missouri State	W 70–64	9–9 (3–2)	JQH Arena (4,923); Springfield, MO
Jan 19, 2019; 1:00 pm, ESPN+		Illinois State	L 70–78	9–10 (3–3)	Ford Center (5,731); Evansville, IN
Jan 23, 2019; 7:00 pm, ESPN+		at Drake	L 66–78	9–11 (3–4)	Knapp Center (2,709); Des Moines, IA
Jan 26, 2019; 7:00 pm, ESPN+		at Northern Iowa	L 74–81	9–12 (3–5)	McLeod Center (3,677); Cedar Falls, IA
Jan 30, 2019; 6:00 pm, ESPN+		Bradley	L 73–81	9–13 (3–6)	Ford Center (5,019); Evansville, IN
Feb 2, 2019; 1:00 pm, FSMW/NBCSCH		Valparaiso	W 64–53	10–13 (4–6)	Ford Center (5,805); Evansville, IN
Feb 6, 2019; 6:00 pm, ESPN+		at Indiana State	L 62–85	10–14 (4–7)	Hulman Center (3,469); Terre Haute, IN
Feb 9, 2019; 7:00 pm, ESPN+		at Southern Illinois	L 73–78	10–15 (4–8)	SIU Arena (4,923); Carbondale, IL
Feb 13, 2019; 6:00 pm, ESPN3		Missouri State	L 56–68	10–16 (4–9)	Ford Center (5,289); Evansville, IN
Feb 17, 2019; 3:00 pm, ESPN3		Northern Iowa	L 58–73	10–17 (4–10)	Ford Center (6,148); Evansville, IN
Feb 20, 2019; 6:00 pm, FSNW/NBCSCH		at Loyola–Chicago	L 58–70	10–18 (4–11)	Joseph J. Gentile Arena (3,204); Chicago, IL
Feb 23, 2019; 7:00 pm, ESPN+		at Bradley	L 61–63	10–19 (4–12)	Carver Arena (6,571); Peoria, IL
Feb 27, 2019; 1:00 pm, ESPN+		Southern Illinois	L 91–98	10–20 (4–13)	Ford Center (6,198); Evansville, IN
Mar 2, 2019; TBA, CBSSN/ESPN2		at Valparaiso	W 65–63	11–20 (5–13)	Athletics–Recreation Center (2,592); Valparaiso, IN
Missouri Valley tournament
Mar 7, 2019	(10)	vs. (7) Illinois State; First round	L 60–65	11–21	Enterprise Center (5,004); St. Louis, MO
*Non-conference game. ^{#}Rankings from AP Poll. (#) Tournament seedings in parentheses. All times are in Central Time.
