= 2018–19 Northern Iowa Panthers men's basketball team =

American college basketball season

2018–19 Northern Iowa Panthers men's basketball
- Conference: Missouri Valley Conference
- Record: 16–18 (9–9 MVC)
- Head coach: Ben Jacobson (13th season)
- Assistant coaches: P.J. Hogan; Erik Crawford; Kyle Green
- Home arena: McLeod Center

2018–19 Missouri Valley Conference men's basketball standings
	Conf.				Overall
Team	W		L	PCT	W		L	PCT
Loyola Chicago	12	–	6	.667	20	–	14	.588
Drake	12	–	6	.667	24	–	10	.706
Southern Illinois	10	–	8	.556	17	–	15	.531
Missouri State	10	–	8	.556	16	–	16	.500
Bradley †	9	–	9	.500	20	–	15	.571
Northern Iowa	9	–	9	.500	16	–	18	.471
Illinois State	9	–	9	.500	17	–	16	.515
Indiana State	7	–	11	.389	15	–	16	.484
Valparaiso	7	–	11	.389	15	–	18	.455
Evansville	5	–	13	.278	11	–	21	.344
† 2019 MVC tournament winner

The 2018–19 Northern Iowa Panthers men's basketball team represented the University of Northern Iowa during the 2018–19 NCAA Division I men's basketball season. The Panthers, led by 13th-year head coach Ben Jacobson, played their home games at the McLeod Center in Cedar Falls, Iowa as members of the Missouri Valley Conference. They finished the season 16–18, 9–9 in MVC play to finish in a three-way tie for fifth place. As the No. 6 seed in the MVC tournament, they beat Southern Illinois and Drake before losing to Bradley in the championship.

== Previous season ==
The Panthers finished the 2017–18 season 16–16, 7–11 in MVC play to finish three-way tie for seventh place. As the No. 7 seed in the MVC tournament, they defeated Evansville in the first round before losing to Loyola–Chicago in the quarterfinals.

== Offseason ==
=== Departures ===
Name	Number	Pos.	Height	Weight	Year	Hometown	Reason for departure
Adam McDermott	1	G	6'4"	190	RS Sophomore	Cedar Rapids, IA	Walk-on; transferred to Coe College
Klint Carlson	2	F	6'7"	225	RS Senior	Waverly, IA	Graduated
Ted Friedman	3	C	6'9"	245	RS Senior	Ankeny, IA	Graduated
Rafael de Souza	5	G	6'1"	180	Senior	Jundiaí, Brazil	Walk-on; left the team for personal reasons
Juwan McCloud	13	G	5'11"	173	Sophomore	Germantown, WI	Graduate transferred to Minnesota State
Hunter Rhodes	21	G	6'0"	175	Senior	Canton, IL	Graduated
Tanner Lohaus	22	F	6'7"	205	RS Freshman	North Liberty, IA	Left the team for personal reasons
Bennett Koch	25	F/C	6'10"	235	RS Senior	Ashwaubenon, WI	Graduated/signed to play professional in Netherlands with Dutch Windmills

=== Incoming transfers ===
Name	Number	Pos.	Height	Weight	Year	Hometown	Previous School
Tray Croft	5	G	6'1"	170	Junior	Anniston, AL	Junior college transferred from Iowa Central Community College
Trae Berhow	11	G	6'5"	195	Sophomore	Watertown, MN	Transferred from Pepperdine. Under NCAA transfer rules, Berhow will have to sit out for the 2018–19 season. Will have three years of remaining eligibility.
Shandon Goldman	20	F	6'9"	220	Junior	Evansville, AR	Junior college transferred from Panola College

=== 2018 recruiting class ===
College recruiting information
Name	Hometown	School	Height	Weight	Commit date
A. J. Green #18 PG	Cedar Falls, IA	Cedar Falls High School	6 ft 3 in (1.91 m)	165 lb (75 kg)	Aug 11, 2017
A. J. Green #18 PG	Recruit ratings: Scout: Rivals: (84)				
Overall recruit ranking:
Note: In many cases, Scout, Rivals, 247Sports, On3, and ESPN may conflict in their listings of height and weight.; In these cases, the average was taken. ESPN grades are on a 100-point scale.; Sources: "2018 Team Ranking". Rivals.

=== 2019 recruiting class ===
College recruiting information (2019)
Name	Hometown	School	Height	Weight	Commit date
James Betz; PF	Garner, IA	Garner-Hayfield High School	6 ft 7 in (2.01 m)	210 lb (95 kg)	Aug 11, 2017
James Betz; PF	Recruit ratings: Scout: Rivals: (N/A)				
Cole Henry; SG	Oskaloosa, IA	Oskaloosa High School	6 ft 5 in (1.96 m)	210 lb (95 kg)	Aug 13, 2018
Cole Henry; SG	Recruit ratings: Scout: Rivals: (N/A)				
Noah Carter; PF	Dubuque, IA	Dubuque Senior High School	6 ft 4 in (1.93 m)	205 lb (93 kg)	Jun 27, 2018
Noah Carter; PF	Recruit ratings: Scout: Rivals: (N/A)				
Overall recruit ranking:
Note: In many cases, Scout, Rivals, 247Sports, On3, and ESPN may conflict in their listings of height and weight.; In these cases, the average was taken. ESPN grades are on a 100-point scale.; Sources: "2019 Team Ranking". Rivals.

=== 2020 recruiting class ===
College recruiting information (2020)
Name	Hometown	School	Height	Weight	Commit date
Tytan Anderson; PG	Eldridge, IA	North Scott Senior High School	5 ft 10 in (1.78 m)	N/A	Aug 14, 2018
Tytan Anderson; PG	Recruit ratings: Scout: Rivals: (N/A)				
Overall recruit ranking:
Note: In many cases, Scout, Rivals, 247Sports, On3, and ESPN may conflict in their listings of height and weight.; In these cases, the average was taken. ESPN grades are on a 100-point scale.; Sources: "2019 Team Ranking". Rivals.

== Roster ==
2018–19 Northern Iowa Panthers men's basketball team
Players
Coaches

Pos.	#	Name	Height	Weight	Year	Previous school	Hometown
G	3	Tywhon Pickford	6 ft 4 in (1.93 m)	202 lb (92 kg)	So	Maple Grove	Minneapolis, MN
G	4	A. J. Green	6 ft 4 in (1.93 m)	175 lb (79 kg)	Fr	Cedar Falls	Cedar Falls, IA
G	5	Tray Croft (redshirt)	6 ft 1 in (1.85 m)	170 lb (77 kg)	Jr	Anniston; Iowa Central CC	Anniston, AL
G	10	Miles Wentzien (W)	6 ft 3 in (1.91 m)	190 lb (86 kg)	Sr	Fort Madison; Kirkwood CC	Fort Madison, IA
G	11	Trae Berhow (redshirt)	6 ft 5 in (1.96 m)	195 lb (88 kg)	So	Watertown Mayer; Pepperdine	Watertown, MN
F	12	Lincoln Conrey	6 ft 5 in (1.96 m)	203 lb (92 kg)	RS Jr	Waterloo West	Waterloo, IA
C	15	Justin Dahl	7 ft 0 in (2.13 m)	261 lb (118 kg)	RS Jr	Holy Family	Carver, MN
F	20	Shandon Goldman	6 ft 10 in (2.08 m)	220 lb (100 kg)	Jr	Lincoln; Chipola College	Evansville, AR
G	22	Wyatt Lohaus	6 ft 2 in (1.88 m)	192 lb (87 kg)	RS Sr	Iowa City West	North Liberty, IA
G	24	Isaiah Brown	6 ft 7 in (2.01 m)	180 lb (82 kg)	Jr	Flower Mound	Flower Mound, TX
G	30	Spencer Haldeman	6 ft 1 in (1.85 m)	175 lb (79 kg)	RS Jr	Western Dubuque	Peosta, IA
F	34	Luke McDonnell	6 ft 9 in (2.06 m)	212 lb (96 kg)	RS Jr	Dubuque Senior	Dubuque, IA
F	50	Austin Phyfe	6 ft 9 in (2.06 m)	235 lb (107 kg)	So	Waverly-Shell Rock	Waverly, IA

Head coach

- Ben Jacobson (North Dakota)

Assistant coach(es)

- P.J. Hogan (Morningside)
- Erik Crawford (Iowa State)
- Kyle Green (Hamline)

Legend

- (C) Team captain
- (S) Suspended
- (I) Ineligible
- (W) Walk-on
- Injured
- Current redshirt

Roster

== Schedule and results ==
Date time, TV	Rank^{#}	Opponent^{#}	Result	Record	Site (attendance) city, state
Exhibition
Oct 28, 2018*; 1:00 pm		Wartburg	W 110–69		McLeod Center; Cedar, Falls, IA
Nov 1, 2018*; 7:00 pm		Upper Iowa	W 82–63		McLeod Center (3,054); Cedar, Falls, IA
Non-conference regular season
Nov 6, 2018*; 7:00 pm, ESPN+		Bemidji State	W 97–51	1–0	McLeod Center (3,233); Cedar, Falls, IA
Nov 10, 2018*; 7:00 pm, ESPN+		at UT Arlington	L 64–75	1–1	College Park Center (3,789); Arlington, TX
Nov 16, 2018*; 5:00 pm		vs. Penn; Paradise Jam Quarterfinals	L 71–78	1–2	Sports and Fitness Center; St. Thomas, VI
Nov 17, 2018; 4:30 pm		vs. Eastern Kentucky; Paradise Jam	W 90–85	2–2	Sports and Fitness Center (1,253); St. Thomas, VI
Nov 19, 2018*; 2:00pm		vs. Old Dominion; Paradise Jam	W 54–53	3–2	Sports and Fitness Center (886); St. Thomas, VI
Nov 23, 2018*; 6:00 pm		at Old Dominion; Paradise Jam campus game	L 65–72	3–3	Ted Constant Convocation Center (5,529); Norfolk, VA
Nov 28, 2018*; 8:00 pm		at Utah State; MW–MVC Challenge	L 52–71	3–4	Smith Spectrum (5,134); Logan, UT
Dec 1, 2018*; 8:00 pm		vs. South Dakota State; U.S. Bank Basketball Classic	L 50–82	3–5	U.S. Bank Stadium (3,184); Minneapolis, MN
Dec 8, 2018*; 1:00 pm, ESPN+		Dubuque	W 75–67	4–5	McLeod Center (3,314); Cedar, Falls, IA
Dec 15, 2018*; 6:00 pm, BTN		vs. No. 22 Iowa; Hy-Vee Classic	L 54–77	4–6	Wells Fargo Arena (12,236); Des Moines, IA
Dec 19, 2018*; 7:30 pm, ESPN+		Grand Canyon	L 62–73	4–7	McLeod Center (3,394); Cedar, Falls, IA
Dec 22, 2018*; 1:00 pm, ESPN+		North Dakota	W 64–62	5–7	McLeod Center (3,619); Cedar, Falls, IA
Dec 29, 2018*; 7:00 pm, ESPN+		Stony Brook	L 63–73	5–8	McLeod Center (3,262); Cedar, Falls, IA
Missouri Valley Conference regular season
Jan 2, 2019; 7:00 pm, ESPN+		at Bradley	W 65–47	6–8 (1–0)	Carver Arena (5,252); Peoria, IL
Jan 5, 2019; 7:00 pm, ESPN+		Southern Illinois	L 51–58	6–9 (1–1)	McLeod Center (3,783); Cedar Falls, IA
Jan 8, 2019; 7:00 pm, NBCSCH		at Illinois State	L 69–70	6–10 (1–2)	Redbird Arena (4,107); Normal, IL
Jan 13, 2019; 3:00 pm, FSMW/NBCSCH		Drake	W 57–54	7–10 (2–2)	McLeod Center (4,141); Cedar Falls, IA
Jan 16, 2019; 7:00 pm, PSN/ESPN+		Indiana State	W 69–64	8–10 (3–2)	McLeod Center (3,457); Cedar Falls, IA
Jan 19, 2019; 3:00 pm, FSMW/NBCSCH		at Valparaiso	L 66–75	8–11 (3–3)	Athletics–Recreation Center (3,160); Valpraiso, IN
Jan 23, 2019; 7:00 pm, ESPN+		at Southern Illinois	L 62–70	8–12 (3–4)	SIU Arena (4,419); Carbondale, IL
Jan 26, 2019; 7:00 pm, ESPN+		Evansville	W 81–74	9–12 (4–4)	McLeod Center (3,677); Cedar Falls, IA
Jan 30, 2019; 6:00 pm, NBCSCH+		at Loyola–Chicago	L 60–61	9–13 (4–5)	Joseph J. Gentile Arena (3,011); Chicago, IL
Feb 2, 2019; 7:00 pm, ESPN+		Missouri State	W 64–59	10–13 (5–5)	McLeod Center (3,882); Cedar Falls, IA
Feb 6, 2019; 7:00 pm, ESPN+		Bradley	L 71–79	10–14 (5–6)	McLeod Center (3,345); Cedar, Falls, IA
Feb 9, 2019; 5:00 pm, FSMW/NBCSCH		at Drake	L 77–83	10–15 (5–7)	Knapp Center (5,632); Des Moines, IA
Feb 13, 2019; 7:00 pm, ESPN+		Illinois State	W 77-64	11–15 (6–7)	McLeod Center; Cedar Falls, IA
Feb 17, 2019; 1:00 pm, ESPN3		at Evansville	W 73-58	12–15 (7–7)	Ford Center; Evansville, IN
Feb 20, 2019; 7:00 pm, ESPN+		at Missouri State	W 63-43	13–15 (8–7)	JQH Arena; Springfield, MO
Feb 23, 2019; 7:00 pm, ESPN3		Valparaiso	W 64-53	14–15 (9–7)	McLeod Center; Cedar Falls, IA
Feb 27, 2019; 7:00 pm, ESPN+		Loyola–Chicago	L 55–56	14–16 (9–8)	McLeod Center; Cedar Falls, IA
Mar 2, 2019; 2:00 pm, ESPN+		at Indiana State	L 54–71	14–17 (9–9)	Hulman Center; Terre Haute, IN
Missouri Valley tournament
Mar 8, 2019; 9:30 pm, ESPN+	(6)	vs. (3) Southern Illinois; Quarterfinals	W 61–58	15–17	Enterprise Center; St. Louis, MO
Mar 9, 2019; 5:05 pm, CBSSN	(6)	vs. (2) Drake; Semifinals	W 60–58	16–17	Enterprise Center; St. Louis, MO
Mar 10, 2019; 1:05 pm, CBS	(6)	vs. (5) Bradley; Championship Game	L 54–57	16–18	Enterprise Center; St. Louis, MO
*Non-conference game. ^{#}Rankings from AP Poll. (#) Tournament seedings in parentheses. All times are in Central Time.

Panther Sports Network (PSN) Cedar Falls Utilities Ch. 15/HD415; KCRG-TV Ch. 9.2; WHO-DT Ch. 13.2; KGCW Ch. 26, (NBC Sports Chicago or NBCSC+)
