= 2018–19 Southern Illinois Salukis men's basketball team =

American college basketball season

2018–19 Southern Illinois Salukis men's basketball
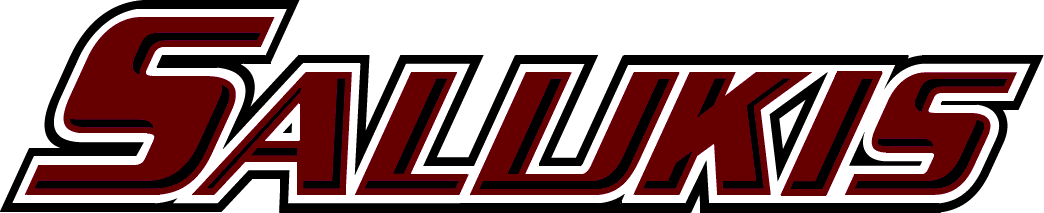
- Conference: Missouri Valley Conference
- Record: 17–15 (10–8 MVC)
- Head coach: Barry Hinson (7th season)
- Assistant coaches: Brad Autry; Anthony Beane Sr.; Justin Walker
- Home arena: SIU Arena

2018–19 Missouri Valley Conference men's basketball standings
	Conf.				Overall
Team	W		L	PCT	W		L	PCT
Loyola Chicago	12	–	6	.667	20	–	14	.588
Drake	12	–	6	.667	24	–	10	.706
Southern Illinois	10	–	8	.556	17	–	15	.531
Missouri State	10	–	8	.556	16	–	16	.500
Bradley †	9	–	9	.500	20	–	15	.571
Northern Iowa	9	–	9	.500	16	–	18	.471
Illinois State	9	–	9	.500	17	–	16	.515
Indiana State	7	–	11	.389	15	–	16	.484
Valparaiso	7	–	11	.389	15	–	18	.455
Evansville	5	–	13	.278	11	–	21	.344
† 2019 MVC tournament winner

The 2018–19 Southern Illinois Salukis men's basketball team represented Southern Illinois University Carbondale during the 2018–19 NCAA Division I men's basketball season. The Salukis, led by seventh-year head coach Barry Hinson, played their home games at the SIU Arena in Carbondale, Illinois as members of the Missouri Valley Conference. They finished the season 17–15 overall, 10–8 in MVC play, finishing in a tie for third place. As the No. 3 seed in the MVC tournament, the Salukis were upset by No. 6 seed Northern Iowa in the quarterfinals.

In an emotional news conference following the game, Southern Illinois head coach Barry Hinson, announced he was stepping down as the coach of the Salukis. On March 20, 2019, the school hired former SIU star point guard and Loyola assistant coach Bryan Mullins as head coach.

== Previous season ==
The Salukis finished the 2017–18 season 20–13, 11–7 in MVC play to finish in second place. In the MVC tournament, they defeated Missouri State in the quarterfinals before losing to Illinois State in the semifinals. Despite winning 20 games, the Salukis did not participate in a postseason tournament.

== Offseason ==
=== Departures ===
Name	Number	Pos.	Height	Weight	Year	Hometown	Reason for departure
Jonathan Wiley	0	G	6'7"	201	Senior	Houston, TX	Graduated
Tyler Smithpeters	11	G	6'4"	203	RS Senior	Harrisburg, IL	Graduated
Austin Weiher	15	F	6'8"	206	RS Junior	Kent, WA	Graduate transferred

=== 2018 recruiting class ===
College recruiting information
Name	Hometown	School	Height	Weight	Commit date
Darius Beane; PG	Carbondale, IL	Carbondale Community High School	6 ft 4 in (1.93 m)	165 lb (75 kg)	Aug 1, 2017
Darius Beane; PG	Recruit ratings: Scout: Rivals: 247Sports: (NR)				
Sam Shafer; SG	Frankford, IL	Lincoln-Way East High School	6 ft 5 in (1.96 m)	215 lb (98 kg)	May 1, 2017
Sam Shafer; SG	Recruit ratings: Scout: Rivals: (NR)				
Amadou Fall; SF	Senegal	St. Louis Christian Academy	6 ft 9 in (2.06 m)	215 lb (98 kg)	Nov 10, 2017
Amadou Fall; SF	Recruit ratings: Scout: Rivals: (NR)				
Overall recruit ranking:
Note: In many cases, Scout, Rivals, 247Sports, On3, and ESPN may conflict in their listings of height and weight.; In these cases, the average was taken. ESPN grades are on a 100-point scale.; Sources: "2018 Team Ranking". Rivals.

=== 2019 recruiting class ===
College recruiting information (2019)
Name	Hometown	School	Height	Weight	Commit date
Lance Jones; SG	Evanston, IL	Evanston Township High School	6 ft 2 in (1.88 m)	180 lb (82 kg)	Mar 21, 2018
Lance Jones; SG	Recruit ratings: Scout: Rivals: (NR)				
Evan Taylor; SF	Glen Ellyn, IL	Glenbard West High School	6 ft 5 in (1.96 m)	N/A	Jun 28, 2018
Evan Taylor; SF	Recruit ratings: Scout: Rivals: (NR)				
Overall recruit ranking:
Note: In many cases, Scout, Rivals, 247Sports, On3, and ESPN may conflict in their listings of height and weight.; In these cases, the average was taken. ESPN grades are on a 100-point scale.; Sources: "2019 Team Ranking". Rivals.

== Roster ==
2018–19 Southern Illinois Salukis men's basketball team
Players
Coaches

Pos.	#	Name	Height	Weight	Year	Previous school	Hometown
G	1	David Swedura (W)	5 ft 11 in (1.8 m)	170 lb (77 kg)	Fr	Prospect	Mount Prospect, IL
F	2	Sekou Dembele	6 ft 7 in (2.01 m)	230 lb (104 kg)	Fr	Central Park Christian School	Bamako, Mali
G	3	Marcus Bartley	6 ft 5 in (1.96 m)	200 lb (91 kg)	RS Sr	Saint Louis; Douglas MacArthur	Decatur, IL
G	4	Eric McGill	6 ft 2 in (1.88 m)	175 lb (79 kg)	RS Jr	Panola College; Bartlett	Memphis, TN
G	5	Darius Beane	6 ft 3 in (1.91 m)	165 lb (75 kg)	Fr	Carbonale	Carbondale, IL
G	10	Aaron Cook Jr.	6 ft 2 in (1.88 m)	185 lb (84 kg)	Jr	Westminster Christian	St. Louis, MO
G	13	Sean Lloyd Jr.	6 ft 5 in (1.96 m)	215 lb (98 kg)	Sr	Mt. Zion Prep	Philadelphia, PA
F	15	Amadou Fall	6 ft 9 in (2.06 m)	220 lb (100 kg)	Fr	St. Louis Christian Academy	Kaolack, Senegal
G	22	Armon Fletcher	6 ft 5 in (1.96 m)	215 lb (98 kg)	RS Sr	Edwardsville	Edwardsville, IL
G	23	Sam Shafer	6 ft 6 in (1.98 m)	205 lb (93 kg)	Fr	Lincoln Way East	Frankfort, IL
F	24	Rudy Stradnieks	6 ft 9 in (2.06 m)	240 lb (109 kg)	Sr	Lee Academy	Riga, Latvia
G	25	Brendon Gooch	6 ft 5 in (1.96 m)	205 lb (93 kg)	RS So	Althoff	Belleville, IL
C	33	Kavion Pippen	6 ft 10 in (2.08 m)	245 lb (111 kg)	Sr	Hamburg; Three Rivers College	Hamburg, AR
F	40	Thik Bol	6 ft 8 in (2.03 m)	225 lb (102 kg)	RS Sr	Benson; Iowa Western CC	Omaha, NE

Head coach

- Barry Hinson (Oklahoma State)

Assistant coach(es)

- Jerome Beane, Sr. (Kansas State)
- Brad Autry (Northwestern Oklahoma State)
- Justin Walker (Eastern Illinois)

Legend

- (C) Team captain
- (S) Suspended
- (I) Ineligible
- (W) Walk-on
- Injured
- Current redshirt

Roster

== Schedule and results ==
Date time, TV	Rank^{#}	Opponent^{#}	Result	Record	Site (attendance) city, state
Exhibition
Nov 1, 2018*; 7:00 pm		East Central	W 76–49		SIU Arena (3,554); Carbondale, IL
Non-conference regular season
Nov 9, 2018*; 6:00 pm, SECN		at No. 2 Kentucky	L 59–71	0–1	Rupp Arena (20,277); Lexington, KY
Nov 12, 2018*; 7:00 pm, ESPN+		No. 25 Buffalo; Charles Helleny Tip-Off Classic	L 53–62	0–2	SIU Arena (4,373); Carbondale, IL
Nov 17, 2018*; 7:00 pm, ESPN3		Arkansas–Pine Bluff; Las Vegas Holiday Invitational	W 78–48	1–2	SIU Arena (4,003); Carbondale, IL
Nov 19, 2018*; 7:00 pm, ESPN+		Howard; Las Vegas Holiday Invitational	W 83–69	2–2	SIU Arena (3,720); Carbondale, IL
Nov 22, 2018*; 12:30 pm, FS1		vs. Massachusetts; Las Vegas Holiday Invitational semifinals	L 62–84	2–3	Orleans Arena; Paradise, NV
Nov 23, 2018*; 11:30 pm, FS1		vs. Tulsa; Las Vegas Holiday Invitational 3rd place game	W 79–69	3–3	Orleans Arena; Paradise, NV
Nov 27, 2018*; 8:00 pm		at Colorado State; MW–MVC Challenge	W 82–67	4–3	Moby Arena (2,566); Fort Collins, CO
Dec 1, 2018*; 1:00 pm, ESPN+		at SIU Edwardsville	W 82–61	5–3	Vadalabene Center (3,360); Edwardsville, IL
Dec 5, 2018*; 7:00 pm, ESPN+		Saint Louis	W 61–56	6–3	SIU Arena (5,021); Carbondale, IL
Dec 8, 2018*; 6:30 pm, ESPN+		at Southeast Missouri State	W 83–73	7–3	Show Me Center (3,432); Cape Girardeau, MO
Dec 12, 2018*; 7:00 pm, ESPN+		Murray State	L 52–80	7–4	SIU Arena (5,107); Carbondale, IL
Dec 15, 2018*; 1:00 pm, ESPN+		at No. 14 Buffalo	L 65–73	7–5	Alumni Arena (5,513); Amherst, NY
Dec 22, 2018*; 3:00 pm, ESPN+		Winthrop	L 71–79	7–6	SIU Arena (5,009); Carbondale, IL
Missouri Valley regular season
Jan 2, 2019; 7:00 pm, ESPN+		Missouri State	W 75–70	8–6 (1–0)	SIU Arena (4,167); Carbondale, IL
Jan 5, 2019; 7:00 pm, ESPN+		at Northern Iowa	W 58–51	9–6 (2–0)	McLeod Center (3,783); Cedar Falls, IA
Jan 8, 2019; 7:00 pm, ESPN+		at Drake	L 70–82	9–7 (2–1)	Knapp Center (2,638); Des Moines, IA
Jan 12, 2019; 3:00 pm, FSMW/NBCSCH		Valparaiso	L 61-65	9–8 (2–2)	SIU Arena (4,671); Carbondale, IL
Jan 15, 2019; 6:00 pm, CBSSN		at Illinois State	L 58–59	9–9 (2–3)	Redbird Arena (4,588); Normal, IL
Jan 20, 2019; 3:00 pm, ESPNU/ESPN3		Bradley	L 54–57	9–10 (2–4)	SIU Arena (4,327); Carbondale, IL
Jan 23, 2019; 7:00 pm, ESPN+		Northern Iowa	W 70–62	10–10 (3–4)	SIU Arena (4,419); Carbondale, IL
Jan 27, 2019; 3:00 pm, CBSSN		at Loyola–Chicago	L 50–75	10–11 (3–5)	Joseph J. Gentile Arena (4,712); Chicago, IL
Jan 30, 2019; 8:00 pm, FSMW/NBCSCH		Indiana State	W 88–73	11–11 (4–5)	SIU Arena (4,076); Carbondale, IL
Feb 2, 2019; 1:00 pm, CBSSN		at Bradley	W 72–68	12–11 (5–5)	Carver Arena (5,968); Peoria, IL
Feb 6, 2019; 7:00 pm, FSMW/NBCSCH		at Missouri State	L 59–65	12–12 (5–6)	JQH Arena (5,311); Springfield, MO
Feb 9, 2019; 7:00 pm, ESPN3		Evansville	W 78–73	13–12 (6–6)	SIU Arena (4,923); Carbondale, IL
Feb 12, 2019; 7:00 pm, ESPN+		Drake	L 69–71	13–13 (6–7)	SIU Arena; Carbondale, IL
Feb 16, 2019; 11:00 am, FSMW/NBCSCH		at Indiana State	W 79–57	14–13 (7–7)	Hulman Center; Terre Haute, IN
Feb 20, 2019; 7:00 pm, ESPN+		at Valparaiso	L 52–55	14–14 (7–8)	Athletics–Recreation Center; Valparaiso, IN
Feb 24, 2019; 3:00 pm, CBSSN/ESPNU		Loyola–Chicago	W 63–53	15–14 (8–8)	SIU Arena; Carbondale, IL
Feb 27, 2019; 6:00 pm, ESPN+		at Evansville	W 98–91	16–14 (9–8)	Ford Center; Evansville, IN
Mar 2, 2019; 1:00 pm		Illinois State	W 72–63	17–14 (10–8)	SIU Arena; Carbondale, IL
Missouri Valley tournament
Mar 8, 2019; 8:30 pm	(3)	vs. (6) Northern Iowa; Quarterfinals	L 58–61	17–15	Enterprise Center (7,936); St. Louis, MO
*Non-conference game. ^{#}Rankings from AP Poll. (#) Tournament seedings in parentheses. All times are in Central Time.
