= 2018–19 Missouri State Bears basketball team =

American college basketball season

2018–19 Missouri State Bears basketball
- Conference: Missouri Valley Conference
- Record: 16–16 (10–8 MVC)
- Head coach: Dana Ford (1st season)
- Assistant coaches: Corey Gipson; Jake Headrick; Jase Herl
- Home arena: JQH Arena

2018–19 Missouri Valley Conference men's basketball standings
| | Conf. | | | | Overall |
| Team | W | | L | PCT | W | | L | PCT |
|---|---|---|---|---|---|---|---|---|
| Loyola Chicago | 12 | – | 6 | .667 | 20 | – | 14 | .588 |
| Drake | 12 | – | 6 | .667 | 24 | – | 10 | .706 |
| Southern Illinois | 10 | – | 8 | .556 | 17 | – | 15 | .531 |
| Missouri State | 10 | – | 8 | .556 | 16 | – | 16 | .500 |
| Bradley † | 9 | – | 9 | .500 | 20 | – | 15 | .571 |
| Northern Iowa | 9 | – | 9 | .500 | 16 | – | 18 | .471 |
| Illinois State | 9 | – | 9 | .500 | 17 | – | 16 | .515 |
| Indiana State | 7 | – | 11 | .389 | 15 | – | 16 | .484 |
| Valparaiso | 7 | – | 11 | .389 | 15 | – | 18 | .455 |
| Evansville | 5 | – | 13 | .278 | 11 | – | 21 | .344 |
† 2019 MVC tournament winner

The 2018–19 Missouri State Bears basketball team represented Missouri State University during the 2018–19 NCAA Division I men's basketball season. The Bears, led by first-year head coach Dana Ford, played their home games at JQH Arena in Springfield, Missouri as members of the Missouri Valley Conference. They finished the season 16–16, 10–8 in MVC play to finish in a tie for third place. As the No. 4 seed in the MVC tournament, they lost in the quarterfinals to Bradley.

== Previous season ==
The Bears finished the 2017–18 season 18–15, 7–11 in MVC play to finish in a three-way tie for seventh place. As the No. 7 seed in the MVC tournament, they beat Valparaiso in the first round before losing to Southern Illinois in the quarterfinals.

On March 3, 2018, the school announced that head coach Paul Lusk had been fired. He finished at Missouri State with a seven-year record of 106–121. The school announced that former Tennessee State head coach Dana Ford had been named head coach of the Bears on March 21.

== Offseason ==
=== Departures ===
| Name | Number | Pos. | Height | Weight | Year | Hometown | Reason for departure |
|---|---|---|---|---|---|---|---|
| Abdul Fofana | 0 | F | 6'7" | 207 | Sophomore | Bobo Dioulasso, Burkina Faso | Walk-on; didn't return |
| Mustafa Lawerence | 1 | G | 6'0" | 186 | Freshman | Newark, NJ | Transferred to Tallahassee CC |
| Reggie Scurry | 2 | F | 6'5" | 213 | Junior | Atlanta, GA | Transferred to Middle Tennessee |
| James Byrd | 3 | G | 6'1" | 185 | Junior | Kansas City, MO | Walk-on; transferred to Central Missouri |
| Greg Williams | 13 | G | 6'6" | 180 | RS Freshman | Houston, TX | Retired from basketball due to injury |
| Ronnie Roussau III | 14 | G | 5'10" | 163 | Senior | Cincinnati, OH | Graduated |
| Jarrid Rhodes | 15 | F | 6'6" | 185 | Senior | Palmeto, FL | Graduated |
| J. T. Miller | 23 | G | 6'2" | 190 | RS Senior | Clinton, NC | Graduated |
| Alize Johnson | 24 | F | 6'9" | 212 | Senior | Williamsport, PA | Graduated |
| Tanveer Bhullar | 34 | C | 7'2" | 278 | RS Senior | Etobicoke, ON | Graduated |

=== Incoming transfers ===
| Name | Number | Pos. | Height | Weight | Year | Hometown | Previous School |
|---|---|---|---|---|---|---|---|
| Josh Webster | 0 | G | 6'4" | 175 | Senior | St. Louis, MO | Transferred from Texas Tech. Will be eligible to play immediately since Webster graduated from Texas Tech. |
| Keandre Cook | 1 | G | 6'5" | 190 | Junior | Baltimore, MD | Junior college transferred from Odessa College |
| Kabir Mohammed | 5 | G | 6'5" | | Junior | Lagos, Nigeria | Junior college transferred from San Jacinto College |
| Spencer Brown | | G | 6'3" | 190 | Junior | Fayetteville, AR | Junior college transferred from Lyon College. Will join the team as a walk-on. |
| Tulio Da Silva | | F | 6'7" | 206 | RS Junior | Formiga, Brazil | Transferred from South Florida. Under NCAA transfer rules, Chastain will have to sit out for the 2018–19 season. Will have two years of remaining eligibility. |
| Tyrik Dixon | | G | 6'1" | 184 | Junior | Bentonville, AR | Transferred from Middle Tennessee. Under NCAA transfer rules, Dixon will have to sit out for the 2018–19 season. Will have two years of remaining eligibility. |
| Josh Hall | | G/F | 6'6" | 190 | Junior | Detroit, MI | Transferred from Nevada. Under NCAA transfer rules, Hall will have to sit out for the 2018–19 season. Will have two years of remaining eligibility. |

=== 2018 recruiting class ===
College recruiting information
| Name | Hometown | School | Height | Weight | Commit date |
|---|---|---|---|---|---|
| Jan Wójcik; PF | Pełczyce, Poland | Élan Chalon | 6 ft 10 in (2.08 m) | 210 lb (95 kg) | May 12, 2018 |
| Jan Wójcik; PF | Recruit ratings: Scout: Rivals: 247Sports: (NR) | | | | |
| Szymon Wójcik; PF | Pełczyce, Poland | Élan Chalon | 6 ft 10 in (2.08 m) | 210 lb (95 kg) | May 1, 2018 |
| Szymon Wójcik; PF | Recruit ratings: Scout: Rivals: 247Sports: (NR) | | | | |
Overall recruit ranking:
Note: In many cases, Scout, Rivals, 247Sports, On3, and ESPN may conflict in their listings of height and weight.; In these cases, the average was taken. ESPN grades are on a 100-point scale.; Sources: "2018 Team Ranking". Rivals.

=== 2019 recruiting class ===
College recruiting information (2019)
| Name | Hometown | School | Height | Weight | Commit date |
|---|---|---|---|---|---|
| Jordan Brinson #31 PG | Los Angeles, CA | Westchester High School | 6 ft 10 in (2.08 m) | 210 lb (95 kg) | Oct 5, 2018 |
| Jordan Brinson #31 PG | Recruit ratings: Scout: Rivals: 247Sports: (80) | | | | |
| Tyem Freeman #44 SF | Springfield, MO | Hillcrest High School | 6 ft 5 in (1.96 m) | 180 lb (82 kg) | Aug 11, 2018 |
| Tyem Freeman #44 SF | Recruit ratings: Scout: Rivals: 247Sports: (78) | | | | |
| Dajuan Harris; PG | Columbia, MO | Rock Bridge High School | 6 ft 1 in (1.85 m) | 160 lb (73 kg) | Aug 11, 2018 |
| Dajuan Harris; PG | Recruit ratings: Scout: Rivals: 247Sports: (NR) | | | | |
| Jamonta Black; SG | Columbia, MO | Rock Bridge High School | 6 ft 4 in (1.93 m) | 190 lb (86 kg) | Apr 14, 2018 |
| Jamonta Black; SG | Recruit ratings: Scout: Rivals: 247Sports: (NR) | | | | |
| Gaige Prim; PF | Aurora, CO | South Plains College | 6 ft 7 in (2.01 m) | 184 lb (83 kg) | Sep 29, 2018 |
| Gaige Prim; PF | Recruit ratings: Scout: Rivals: 247Sports: (NR) | | | | |
Overall recruit ranking:
Note: In many cases, Scout, Rivals, 247Sports, On3, and ESPN may conflict in their listings of height and weight.; In these cases, the average was taken. ESPN grades are on a 100-point scale.; Sources: "2019 Team Ranking". Rivals.

== Roster ==
2018–19 Missouri State Bears men's basketball team
Players
Coaches

| Pos. | # | Name | Height | Weight | Year | Previous school | Hometown |
|---|---|---|---|---|---|---|---|
| G | 0 | Josh Webster | 6 ft 3 in (1.91 m) | 180 lb (82 kg) | Sr | Christian Brothers College; Texas Tech | St. Louis, MO |
| G | 1 | Keandre Cook | 6 ft 5 in (1.96 m) | 183 lb (83 kg) | Jr | Edmondson-Westside; Odessa College | Baltimore, MD |
| F | 5 | Onediah Church | 6 ft 8 in (2.03 m) | 218 lb (99 kg) | Sr | Springfield | Springfield, IL |
| F | 10 | Szymon Wojcik | 6 ft 10 in (2.08 m) | 224 lb (102 kg) | Fr | Élan Chalon | Pełczyce, Poland |
| G | 11 | Jarred Dixon | 6 ft 4 in (1.93 m) | 176 lb (80 kg) | Sr | Lee's Summit West | Kansas City, MO |
| G | 15 | Szymon Wojcik | 6 ft 10 in (2.08 m) | 218 lb (99 kg) | Fr | Élan Chalon | Pełczyce, Poland |
| G | 20 | Ryan Kreklow | 6 ft 4 in (1.93 m) | 185 lb (84 kg) | Sr | Rock Bridge | Columbia, MO |
| G | 21 | Ross Owens (W) | 6 ft 4 in (1.93 m) | 201 lb (91 kg) | Jr | Woodlawn | Woodlawn, IL |
| F | 23 | Kabir Mohammed | 6 ft 5 in (1.96 m) | 233 lb (106 kg) | Jr | National Christian Academy; San Jacinto College | Lagos, Nigeria |
| C | 25 | Darian Scott | 6 ft 11 in (2.11 m) | 220 lb (100 kg) | RS Fr | Centennial | Las Vegas, NV |
| F | 34 | Jared Ridder | 6 ft 7 in (2.01 m) | 209 lb (95 kg) | RS Fr | Kickapoo; Xavier | Springfield, MO |
| G | | Spencer Brown (W) | 6 ft 2 in (1.88 m) | 191 lb (87 kg) | Jr | Fayetteville; Lyon College | Fayetteville, AR |
| F | | Tulio Da Silva | 6 ft 8 in (2.03 m) | 211 lb (96 kg) | RS Jr | Arlington Country Day School; South Florida | Formiga, Brazil |
| G | | Tyrik Dixon (redshirt) | 6 ft 1 in (1.85 m) | 173 lb (78 kg) | Jr | Southwest Christian Academy; Middle Tennessee | Bentonville, AR |
| G/F | | Josh Hall (redshirt) | 6 ft 7 in (2.01 m) | 200 lb (91 kg) | Jr | Montverde Academy; Nevada | Detroit, MI |

Head coach

- Dana Ford (Illinois State)

Assistant coach(es)

- Corey Gipson (Austin Peay)
- Jake Headrick (Montevallo)
- Jase Herl (Colorado Mesa)

Legend

- (C) Team captain
- (S) Suspended
- (I) Ineligible
- (W) Walk-on
- Injured
- Current redshirt

Roster

== Schedule and results ==
| Date time, TV | Rank^{#} | Opponent^{#} | Result | Record | Site city, state |
Exhibition
| Oct 30, 2018*; 7:00 pm | | Evangel | W 77–28 | | JQH Arena (3,209); Springfield, MO |
Non-conference regular season
| Nov 6, 2018*; 7:00 pm, ESPN3 | | Oral Roberts | W 84–50 | 1–0 | JQH Arena (5,014); Springfield, MO |
| Nov 9, 2018*; 7:00 pm, ESPN3 | | Robert Morris; Hall of Fame Classic campus-site game | W 74–60 | 2–0 | JQH Arena (5,038); Springfield, MO |
| Nov 11, 2018*; 3:00 pm, KOZL | | Stetson; Hall of Fame Classic campus-site game | W 83–70 | 3–0 | JQH Arena (3,879); Springfield, MO |
| Nov 19, 2018*; 6:00 pm, ESPNU | | vs. Nebraska; Hall of Fame Classic semifinals | L 62–85 | 3–1 | Sprint Center; Kansas City, MO |
| Nov 20, 2018*; 6:00 pm, ESPN3 | | vs. USC; Hall of Fame Classic consolation | L 80–99 | 3–2 | Sprint Center (6,521); Kansas City, MO |
| Nov 24, 2018*; 7:00 pm, ESPN+ | | at Murray State | L 66–77 | 3–3 | CFSB Center (2,701); Murray, KY |
| Nov 28, 2018*; 8:15 pm | | at Air Force; MW–MVC Challenge | L 69–88 | 3–4 | Clune Arena (1,629); Colorado Springs, CO |
| Dec 1, 2018*; 6:00 pm, P12N | | at Oregon State | L 77–101 | 3–5 | Gill Coliseum (4,369); Corvallis, OR |
| Dec 5, 2018*; 7:00 pm, ESPN+ | | Western Kentucky | W 84–78 | 4–5 | JQH Arena (4,893); Springfield, MO |
| Dec 15, 2018*; 7:30 pm | | at North Dakota State | L 67–74 | 4–6 | Scheels Center (1,942); Fargo, ND |
| Dec 18, 2018*; 7:00 pm | | at Arkansas State | L 63–71 | 4–7 | First National Bank Arena (1,409); Jonesboro, AR |
| Dec 22, 2018*; 1:00 pm, ESPN+ | | Arkansas–Pine Bluff | W 93–72 | 5–7 | JQH Arena (3,826); Springfield, MO |
| Dec 30, 2018*; 5:00 pm, ESPN+ | | William Woods | W 110–56 | 6–7 | JQH Arena (3,174); Springfield, MO |
Missouri Valley regular season
| Jan 2, 2019; 7:00 pm, ESPN+ | | at Southern Illinois | L 70–75 | 6–8 (0–1) | SIU Arena (4,167); Carbondale, IL |
| Jan 5, 2019; 1:00 pm | | Valparaiso | L 66–82 | 6–9 (0–2) | JQH Arena (4,179); Springfield, MO |
| Jan 8, 2019; 6:00 pm, ESPN3 | | at Indiana State | W 72–57 | 7–9 (1–2) | Hulman Center (3,420); Terre Haute, IN |
| Jan 12, 2019; 7:00 pm, ESPN+ | | at Bradley | W 69–64 | 8–9 (2–2) | Carver Arena (5,009); Peoria, IL |
| Jan 16, 2019; 7:00 pm, ESPN+ | | Evansville | L 64–70 | 8–10 (2–3) | JQH Arena (4,923); Springfield, MO |
| Jan 20, 2019; 3:00 pm, ESPN3 | | at Drake | L 63–74 | 8–11 (2–4) | Knapp Center (3,124); Des Moines, IA |
| Jan 23, 2019; 8:00 pm, CBSSN | | Loyola–Chicago | W 70–35 | 9–11 (3–4) | JQH Arena (4,863); Springfield, MO |
| Jan 26, 2019; 3:00 pm, FSMW | | Bradley | W 55–37 | 10–11 (4–4) | JQH Arena (5,215); Springfield, MO |
| Jan 29, 2019; 7:00 pm, ESPN+ | | at Valparaiso | W 55–54 ^{OT} | 11–11 (5–4) | Athletics–Recreation Center (1,333); Valparaiso, IN |
| Feb 2, 2019; 7:00 pm | | at Northern Iowa | L 59–64 | 11–12 (5–5) | McLeod Center (3,882); Cedar Falls, IA |
| Feb 6, 2019; 7:00 pm, FSMW | | Southern Illinois | W 65–59 | 12–12 (6–5) | JQH Arena; Springfield, MO |
| Feb 10, 2019; 3:00 pm, ESPNU/ESPN3 | | Illinois State | W 66–65 | 13–12 (7–5) | JQH Arena; Springfield, MO |
| Feb 13, 2019; 6:00 pm, ESPN+ | | at Evansville | W 68–56 | 14–12 (8–5) | Ford Center (5,289); Evansville, IN |
| Feb 17, 2019; 3:00 pm, ESPNU/ESPN3 | | at Loyola–Chicago | W 65–61 | 15–12 (9–5) | Joseph J. Gentile Arena (4,722); Chicago, IL |
| Feb 20, 2019; 7:00 pm, ESPN+ | | Northern Iowa | L 43–63 | 15–13 (9–6) | JQH Arena (6,751); Springfield, MO |
| Feb 23, 2019; 1:00 pm, ESPN3 | | Indiana State | W 67–61 | 16–13 (10–6) | JQH Arena (5,788); Springfield, MO |
| Feb 27, 2019; 6:00 pm, FSMW | | at Illinois State | L 57–65 | 16–14 (10–7) | Redbird Arena (4,468); Normal, IL |
| Mar 2, 2019; 3:00 pm, ESPN2/CBSSN/ESPN3 | | Drake | L 62–73 | 16–15 (10–8) | JQH Arena (7,894); Springfield, MO |
Missouri Valley tournament
| Mar 8, 2019; MVC TV | (4) | vs. (5) Bradley quarterfinals | L 58–61 | 16–16 | Enterprise Center (6,774); St. Louis, MO |
*Non-conference game. ^{#}Rankings from AP Poll. (#) Tournament seedings in parentheses. All times are in Central Time.
