= Daniel Sackey =

Canadian basketball player (born 1999)

No. 0 – Hyères-Toulon
- Position: Point guard

Personal information
- Born: April 9, 1999 (age 27) Winnipeg, Manitoba, Canada
- Listed height: 1.75 m (5 ft 9 in)
- Listed weight: 175 lb (79 kg)

Career information
- High school: Thornlea Secondary School (Thornhill, Ontario)
- College: Valparaiso (2018–2021); New Orleans (2021–2023)
- NBA draft: 2024: undrafted
- Playing career: 2024–present

Career history
- 2024: Sudbury Five
- 2024–present: HTV Basket

Daniel Sackey (born April 9, 1999) is a Canadian professional basketball player for HTV Basket. He played college basketball for the New Orleans Privateers of the Southland Conference. He previously played for the Valparaiso Beacons of the Missouri Valley Conference.

== Early life and high school ==
Sackey was born on April 9, 1999, in Winnipeg, Manitoba and is the son of Ghanaian immigrants. His parents moved to Canada from Ghana in the 1990's. His father is a custodian in the Winnipeg School Division and his mother is a vice principal at Lord Nelson School. His mother is also a pastor.

Sackey played his final season of prep basketball for Thornlea Secondary School in Thornhill, Ontario. He earned First Team All-Star honors from the Ontario Scholastic Basketball Association. He was ranked number 16 in his class in Canada by North Pole Hoops. He was also selected to the 2018 BioSteel All-Canadian Game. He won the Slam Dunk Contest and then finished with 17 points, 5 rebounds and 4 assists.

== College career ==
=== Valparaiso University (2018-2021) ===
On April 11, 2018, Sackey signed a National Letter of Intent to join Valparaiso University for the 2018-2019 season.

During the 2018-2019 season, Sackey appeared in all 33 games for Valparaiso University as a freshman and started 17 times. He averaged 4.1 points and 1.8 assists per game. He led his team in assists on seven occasions.

During the 2019-2020 season, he ranked fifth in the Missouri Valley Conference and second among sophomores at 3.6 assists per game. He averaged 6.3 points and 2.5 rebounds per game. Months before the season began, he started the year with an appearance on SportsCenter's Top 10 plays, coming in at number 9 after knocking down a buzzer-beating triple to beat Carleton University.

On November 9, 2019, Sackey had a career high 22 points during a game against Saint Louis Billikens.

During the 2020-2021 season, he played in 25 games and started 22 of them. He averaged 5.3 points, 3.5 assists and 2.6 rebounds per game.

=== University of New Orleans (2021-2023) ===
On April 15, 2021, Sackey transferred to University of New Orleans where he had two years of eligibility remaining.

During the 2021-2022 season, Sackey played in 31 games and started in 26 games. He averaged 6.6 points and 2.8 assists per game, which was the most on the team.

During the 2022-2023 season, Sackey played in 27 games and started in 11 games. He averaged 3.1 points, 2.2 assists and 1 rebound per game.

On May 19, 2023, Sackey graduated from the university with a Bachelor's Degree in Behavioral Studie s.

== Professional career ==
=== Sudbury Five (2024) ===
On March 23, 2024, Sackey signed to play with Sudbury Five of the BSL.

=== Hyeres-Toulon Var Basket (2024-Present) ===
On October 25, 2024, Sackey signed with HTV Basket.

== National team ==
He was part of the Canadian squad that finished with a 6–1 record at the 2016 FIBA Under-17 World Championship. Sackey averaged 3.3 assists per game in the group phase, ranking him 7th among all players.
