= Dana Ford =

American college basketball coach

Current position
- Title: Assistant coach
- Team: SMU
- Conference: ACC

Biographical details
- Born: June 9, 1984 (age 42); Tamms, Illinois, U.S.

Playing career
- 2002–2006: Illinois State

Coaching career (HC unless noted)
- 2006–2007: Winthrop (GA)
- 2007–2008: Wichita State (GA)
- 2008–2009: Chipola (assistant)
- 2009–2011: Tennessee State (assistant)
- 2011–2012: Wichita State (assistant)
- 2012–2014: Illinois State (assistant)
- 2014–2018: Tennessee State
- 2018–2024: Missouri State
- 2024–present: SMU (assistant)

Head coaching record
- Overall: 163–146 (.528)
- Tournaments: 0–1 (NIT); 0–1 (CIT)

Accomplishments and honors

Awards
- OVC Coach of the Year (2016); Ben Jobe Award (2016)

Dana Ford (born June 9, 1984) is an American college basketball coach who is an assistant coach at SMU. He was formerly the head coach at Missouri State University from March 21, 2018, until he was relieved of his duties on March 10, 2024. Prior to coaching the Bears, he was the head coach at Tennessee State from 2014 through the 2018 season. Ford is a former basketball player, having played at Illinois State from 2002 to 2006. After not being selected in the 2006 NBA draft, the Tamms, Illinois, native joined the Tennessee State Tigers' coaching staff under head coach John Cooper. He has previously been with Wichita State and Illinois State through his coaching career, playing a key role in the teams' recruiting and overall success.

== Playing career ==
Ford attended Egyptian Senior High School in Tamms, Illinois. He became one of the most dangerous high school guards in the area and broke the school record for points scored by the end of his final season. Ford was coached by former All-State point guard Brad Sinks. Sinks would refer to Ford as “the puppet master” because of the way Ford could handle it on a string. To this day, Ford credits Coach Sinks for teaching him to play angry and hard nosed, which is seen in his coaching. Ford was named First Team Class A All-State and a two-time conference player of the year. At the conclusion of his basketball years in high school, the shooting guard averaged 22 points per game. It was highly anticipated that he would bring his talent to the Illinois State Redbirds men's basketball team, choosing the school over other possibilities such as Evansville, Southern Illinois, and Southeast Missouri State.

In his first season with Illinois State, Ford hardly made a significant impact on the team's backcourt scoring. He finished the season averaging 2.0 points, 2.5 rebounds, and 0.6 assists. Ford made eight starts in the entire year and scored his first points in his fourth collegiate appearance against Chattanooga. His sophomore year would be far less successful, with Ford playing just twenty games in the season. Similarly went the following season, but he scored double-digits in the team's postseason game against Creighton. In Ford's final season, he recorded over nine points eight times through the season and logged a career-high 16 points as a starting guard against Grambling State. By the end of his senior year, he ranked within the Missouri Valley Conference's Top 10 under the steals and blocks categories. Ford was also named the squad's defensive player of the year due to this success.

Ford entered the 2006 NBA draft, which turned unsuccessful after he was not selected by a single team at the conclusion of the event.

== Coaching career ==
Ford began his career on the coaching staff at Winthrop, when he was named a graduate assistant. Under head coach Gregg Marshall, the team qualified for an NCAA Tournament berth. He continued holding the same position as he joined Wichita State with Marshall the next season. The Shockers continued to prevail and made another appearance in their postseason tournament.

Ford's first year serving as an assistant coach was at Chipola College, where he led the Indians to an impressive 35–2 overall record and a third-place spot in the NJCAA National Tournament. The team also won its fifth consecutive FCCAA State Championship. His second team as an assistant coach was Tennessee State, where he helped John Cooper lead the team. The Tigers finished with a winning record and an exceptional performance against Murray State. Ford most notably helped in recruiting NBA player Robert Covington to his team roster.

After Tennessee State, Ford returned to Wichita State to serve as an assistant coach under Gregg Marshall. This was his third time coaching alongside Marshall, who made the remark, "This is how much I think of Dana Ford. At age 26, this is the third time I have invited Dana to join my staff…he was first my graduate assistant at Winthrop, followed me to Wichita State, and then after sending him out into the world to Chipola, and to Tennessee State, where he has helped coach Cooper recruit a fine young group of players, I am inviting him back." The Shockers finished the season and Ford was instrumental to their conference tournament victory and an NCAA Tournament appearance.

Ford came back to Illinois State to become the team's assistant coach. He was also named the recruiting coordinator to add on to his original coaching duties.

Following his two seasons with his alma mater, Ford returned to Tennessee State for his first experience as a head coach. The position was secured after Travis Williams left the team following a 5–25 season.

After going 5–26 in his inaugural season as head coach, Ford orchestrated the largest NCAA turnaround from 2014–15 to 2015–16 with a 15-win difference. In 2015–16, Ford was named the OVC Coach of the Year, led his team to 20 wins, and a berth in the CIT postseason tournament. He was also named the 2016 National Association of Basketball Coaches (NABC) District 19 Coach of the Year, CollegeInsiders.com's Ben Jobe Award Winner, and the BOXTOROW Coach of the Year.

== Head coaching record ==
Record table
Season	Team	Overall	Conference	Standing	Postseason
Tennessee State Tigers (Ohio Valley Conference) (2014–2018)
2014–15	Tennessee State	5–26	2–14	6th (East)	
2015–16	Tennessee State	20–11	11–5	T–2nd (East)	CIT First Round
2016–17	Tennessee State	17–13	8–8	T–4th (East)	
2017–18	Tennessee State	15–15	10–8	T–5th	
Tennessee State:		57–65 (.467)	31–35 (.470)		
Missouri State Bears (Missouri Valley Conference) (2018–2024)
2018–19	Missouri State	16–16	10–8	T–3rd	
2019–20	Missouri State	16–17	9–9	T–6th	
2020–21	Missouri State	17–7	12–6	3rd	
2021–22	Missouri State	23–11	13–5	T–2nd	NIT First Round
2022–23	Missouri State	17–15	12–8	6th	
2023–24	Missouri State	17–16	8–12	9th	
Missouri State:		106–82 (.564)	64–48 (.571)		
Total:		163–147 (.526)	95–83 (.534)		
National champion Postseason invitational champion Conference regular season champion Conference regular season and conference tournament champion Division regular season champion Division regular season and conference tournament champion Conference tournament champion

== Personal life ==
Ford is a Christian. Ford is married to Christina Ford. They have three daughters, Charlie Rose, Cline and Courtney as well as three sons, Cameron, Carson, and Crain. Their daughter, Promise, died in infancy.

Ford is a supporter of his wife's charity, The Rebound Foundation, a non-profit that works to provide transitional housing to women and children who've experienced domestic abuse and educate on healthy relationships.
