= 2018–19 Western Athletic Conference men's basketball season =

- League: NCAA Division I
- Sport: Basketball
- Teams: 9

Regular season
- Champion: New Mexico State
- Season MVP: Jake Toolson, UVU

Tournament
- Champions: New Mexico State
- Runners-up: Grand Canyon
- Finals MVP: Trevelin Queen, NMSU

Basketball seasons
- ← 2017–18 2019–20 →

2018–19 WAC men's basketball standings
	Conf.				Overall
Team	W		L	PCT	W		L	PCT
New Mexico State †	15	–	1	.938	30	–	5	.857
Utah Valley	12	–	4	.750	25	–	10	.714
Grand Canyon	10	–	6	.625	20	–	14	.588
Texas–Rio Grande Valley	9	–	7	.563	20	–	17	.541
California Baptist *	7	–	9	.438	16	–	15	.516
Cal State Bakersfield	7	–	9	.438	18	–	16	.529
Seattle	6	–	10	.375	18	–	15	.545
UMKC	6	–	10	.375	11	–	21	.344
Chicago State	0	–	16	.000	3	–	29	.094
† 2019 WAC tournament winner * Ineligible for WAC tournament (reclassification from NCAA Division II)

The 2018–19 Western Athletic Conference men's basketball season began with practices in September 2018 and ended with the 2019 WAC men's basketball tournament March 2019 at the Orleans Arena in Las Vegas, NV. The season marks 56th season of Western Athletic Conference.

== Pre-season ==
The WAC conducted a media teleconference on October 10, 2018 and released the media and coaches poll, as well as the preseason All-WAC teams and player of the year.

=== WAC Media Poll ===
Rank	Team	Votes
1	New Mexico State (22)	214
2	Grand Canyon (2)	180
3	Utah Valley	162
4	Seattle	150
5	Cal State Bakersfield	117
6	Texas Rio Grande Valley	89
7	Missouri-Kansas City	73
8	California Baptist	63
9	Chicago State	66

=== Media All-WAC Team ===
First Team

- Damiyne Durham, CSU Bakersfield
- AJ Harris, NM State
- Matej Kavas, Seattle U
- Alessandro Lever, Grand Canyon
- Conner Toolson, Utah Valley

Second Team

- Xavier Bishop, Kansas City
- Eli Chuha, NM State
- Oscar Frayer, Grand Canyon
- Jake Toolson, Utah Valley
- Terry Winn III, UT Rio Grande Valley

Player of the Year

- Alessandro Lever, Grand Canyon

=== WAC coaches poll ===
Rank	Team	Votes
1	New Mexico State (7)	63
2	Grand Canyon (2)	58
3	Seattle	45
4	Utah Valley	43
5	Cal State Bakersfield	35
6	Texas Rio Grande Valley	28
7	Missouri-Kansas City	24
8	California Baptist	20
9	Chicago State	8

=== Coaches All-WAC Team ===
First Team

- Oscar Frayer, Grand Canyon
- AJ Harris, NM State
- Matej Kavas, Seattle U
- Alessandro Lever, Grand Canyon
- Conner Toolson, Utah Valley

Second Team

- Xavier Bishop, Kansas City
- Eli Chuha, NM State
- Damiyne Durham, CSU Bakersfield
- Jake Toolson, Utah Valley
- Terry Winn III, UT Rio Grande Valley

Player of the Year

- Alessandro Lever, Grand Canyon

== Regular season ==
=== Conference matrix ===
This table summarizes the head-to-head results between teams in conference play. (x) indicates games remaining this season.

	California Baptist	CS Bakersfield	Chicago St.	Grand Canyon	NM St.	Seattle	UTRGV	UMKC	Utah Valley
vs. California Baptist	–	1–1	0–2	2–0	1–1	1–1	1–1	1–1	2–0
vs. Cal State Bakersfield	1–1	-	0–2	2–0	2–0	1–1	1–1	1–1	1–1
vs. Chicago State	2–0	2–0	–	2–0	2–0	2–0	2–0	2–0	2–0
vs. Grand Canyon	0–2	0–2	0–2	-	2–0	1–1	1–1	1–1	1–1
vs. New Mexico State	1–1	0–2	0–2	0–2	-	0–2	0–2	0–2	0–2
vs. Seattle	1–1	1–1	0–2	1–1	2–0	-	2–0	1–1	2–0
vs. Texas - Rio Grande Valley	1–1	1–1	0–2	1–1	2–0	0–2	-	0–2	2–0
vs. UMKC	1–1	1–1	0–2	1–1	2–0	1–1	2–0	-	2–0
vs. Utah Valley	0–2	1–1	0–2	1–1	2–0	0–2	0–2	0–2	-
Total	7–9	7–9	0–16	10–6	15–1	6–10	9–7	6–10	12–4
