= 2018–19 New Mexico State Aggies men's basketball team =

American college basketball season

2018–19 New Mexico State Aggies men's basketball

WAC regular season and tournament champions

NCAA tournament, First Round
- Conference: Western Athletic Conference
- Record: 30–5 (15–1 WAC)
- Head coach: Chris Jans (2nd season)
- Assistant coaches: James Miller; David Anwar; Jeff Mailhot
- Home arena: Pan American Center

2018–19 WAC men's basketball standings
	Conf.				Overall
Team	W		L	PCT	W		L	PCT
New Mexico State †	15	–	1	.938	30	–	5	.857
Utah Valley	12	–	4	.750	25	–	10	.714
Grand Canyon	10	–	6	.625	20	–	14	.588
Texas–Rio Grande Valley	9	–	7	.563	20	–	17	.541
California Baptist *	7	–	9	.438	16	–	15	.516
Cal State Bakersfield	7	–	9	.438	18	–	16	.529
Seattle	6	–	10	.375	18	–	15	.545
UMKC	6	–	10	.375	11	–	21	.344
Chicago State	0	–	16	.000	3	–	29	.094
† 2019 WAC tournament winner * Ineligible for WAC tournament (reclassification from NCAA Division II)

The 2018–19 New Mexico State Aggies men's basketball team represented New Mexico State University during the 2018–19 NCAA Division I men's basketball season. The Aggies, led by second-year head coach Chris Jans, played their home games at the Pan American Center in Las Cruces, New Mexico as members of the Western Athletic Conference. They finished the regular season 27–4 and 15–1 in WAC play to win the WAC regular season championship. In the WAC tournament, they defeated Chicago State, Texas–Rio Grande Valley, and Grand Canyon to become WAC Tournament champions. They received the WAC's automatic bid to the NCAA tournament, where they lost in the first round to Auburn. They also set a school record for wins in a season and won 30 games for the first time in team history.

== Previous season ==
The Aggies finished the 2017–18 season 28–6, 12–2 in WAC play to win the WAC regular season championship. In the WAC tournament, they defeated Chicago State, Seattle, and Grand Canyon to become WAC Tournament champions. They received the WAC's automatic bid to the NCAA tournament where they lost in the first round to Clemson.

== Roster ==
2018–19 New Mexico State Aggies men's basketball team
Players
Coaches

Pos.	#	Name	Height	Weight	Year	Previous school	Hometown
G	0	Berrick JeanLouis	6 ft 4 in (1.93 m)	190 lb (86 kg)	Fr	Canterbury School	Lehigh Acres, FL
G	1	Shunn Buchanan	6 ft 0 in (1.83 m)	170 lb (77 kg)	Jr	Madison Central HS; Northeast Mississippi CC	Durant, MS
G	3	Terrell Brown	6 ft 1 in (1.85 m)	165 lb (75 kg)	Jr	Moreau Catholic HS; CCSF	Hayward, CA
G	4	JoJo Zamora	6 ft 2 in (1.88 m)	180 lb (82 kg)	RS Sr	Newark Memorial HS; Utah	Oakland, CA
G	5	Clayton Henry	6 ft 4 in (1.93 m)	195 lb (88 kg)	Jr	Bishop McNally HS; Palm Beach State	Calgary, Alberta, Canada
G	10	Sir'Jabari Rice	6 ft 4 in (1.93 m)	165 lb (75 kg)	RS Fr	Fort Bend Marshall HS	Houston, TX
G	11	Keyon Jones	6 ft 1 in (1.85 m)	195 lb (88 kg)	Sr	Milton HS; Odessa College	Dorchester, Massachusetts
G	12	AJ Harris	5 ft 9 in (1.75 m)	170 lb (77 kg)	RS Jr	Dunbar HS; Ohio State	Dayton, OH
F	13	C.J. Bobbitt	6 ft 7 in (2.01 m)	225 lb (102 kg)	RS Jr	Harker Heights HS; Denver	Killeen, TX
F	15	Ivan Aurrecoechea	6 ft 8 in (2.03 m)	240 lb (109 kg)	Jr	Canarias Basketball Academy; Indian Hills CC	Madrid, Spain
G	20	Trevelin Queen	6 ft 6 in (1.98 m)	190 lb (86 kg)	Jr	North County HS	Glen Burnie, MD
G	21	Addison Wallace	6 ft 3 in (1.91 m)	200 lb (91 kg)	Fr	Cleburne HS	Cleburne, TX
F	22	Eli Chuha	6 ft 7 in (2.01 m)	230 lb (104 kg)	RS Sr	Redlands East Valley HS	Redlands, CA
F	23	Mohamed Thiam	6 ft 9 in (2.06 m)	210 lb (95 kg)	Jr	Lycee Saidou Nourou Tall; Marshalltown CC	Dakar, Senegal
F	25	Robert Brown	6 ft 9 in (2.06 m)	230 lb (104 kg)	RS Fr	Advanced Preparatory International	Dallas, TX
F	35	Johnny McCants	6 ft 7 in (2.01 m)	225 lb (102 kg)	RS So	Oñate HS	Las Cruces, NM
G		Tennessee Owens	5 ft 11 in (1.8 m)	165 lb (75 kg)	RS Fr	Centennial HS; Alabama–Huntsville	Las Cruces, NM

Head coach

- Chris Jans (Loras)

Assistant coach(es)

- James Miller (CSU Pueblo)
- David Anwar (Fitchburg State)
- Jeff Mailhot (San Jacinto)

Legend

- (C) Team captain
- (S) Suspended
- (I) Ineligible
- (W) Walk-on
- Injured
- Current redshirt

Roster
Last update: November 8, 2018

== Schedule and results ==
Date time, TV	Rank^{#}	Opponent^{#}	Result	Record	High points	High rebounds	High assists	Site (attendance) city, state
Regular season
Nov 6, 2018*; 7:00 pm, AggieVision		North Dakota State; WAC/Summit League Challenge	W 73–56	1–0	16 – Zamora	7 – Henry	2 – Tied	Pan American Center (4,358); Las Cruces, NM
Nov 9, 2018*; 7:00 pm, WAC DN		UTEP; Battle of I-10	W 96–69	2–0	14 – Henry	6 – Tied	3 – Harris	Pan American Center (6,125); Las Cruces, NM
Nov 14, 2018*; 7:00 pm, AggieVision		Saint Mary's	L 58–73	2–1	17 – Harris	6 – Tied	2 – Brown	Pan American Center (6,660); Las Cruces, NM
Nov 17, 2018*; 4:00 pm, ATTSNSW		at New Mexico; Rio Grande Rivalry	W 98–94	3–1	31 – Harris	9 – Thiam	2 – Harris	The Pit (15,411); Albuquerque, NM
Nov 21, 2018*; 6:00 pm, WAC DN		Eastern New Mexico	W 92–65	4–1	14 – Brown	8 – Thiam	6 – Buchanan	Pan American Center (3,807); Las Cruces, NM
Nov 28, 2018*; 7:00 pm, CUSA TV		at UTEP; Battle of I-10	W 62–58	5–1	15 – Aurrecoechea	6 – Aurrecoechea	3 – Harris	Don Haskins Center (6,106); El Paso, TX
Dec 1, 2018*; 7:00 pm, WAC DN		Washington State	W 69–63	6–1	15 – Bobbitt	7 – Tied	7 – Buchanan	Pan American Center (4,880); Las Cruces, NM
Dec 4, 2018*; 7:00 pm, AggieVision		New Mexico; Rio Grande Rivalry	W 100–65	7–1	27 – Zamora	11 – Aurrecoechea	6 – Tied	Pan American Center (6,777); Las Cruces, NM
Dec 8, 2018*; 6:30 pm, ESPN2		at No. 2 Kansas; Jayhawk Shootout	L 60–63	7–2	15 – Zamora	6 – McCants	6 – Aurrecoechea	Sprint Center (15,210); Kansas City, MO
Dec 17, 2018*; 7:00 pm, AggieVision		Northern Colorado; Las Vegas Classic campus game	W 74–62	8–2	20 – Aurrecoechea	10 – Aurrecoechea	3 – Harris	Pan American Center (4,304); Las Cruces, NM
Dec 19, 2018*; 7:00 pm, WAC DN		Cal State Northridge; Las Vegas Classic campus game	W 92–57	9–2	21 – Jones	9 – Chuha	4 – Harris	Pan American Center (5,334); Las Cruces, NM
Dec 22, 2018*; 5:30 pm, FS2		vs. Drake; Las Vegas Classic semifinals	L 63–66	9–3	17 – Brown	10 – Aurrecoechea	2 – Tied	Orleans Arena (2,232); Paradise, NV
Dec 23, 2018*; 8:35 pm, FS2		vs. Washington State; Las Vegas Classic 3rd place game	W 75–72	10–3	28 – Zamora	12 – Chuha	7 – Zamora	Orleans Arena; Paradise, NV
Dec 30, 2018*; 2:00 pm, ATTSNRM		at Colorado State	W 88–68	11–3	22 – Bobbitt	10 – Aurrecoechea	4 – Tied	Moby Arena (3,218); Fort Collins, CO
Jan 3, 2019; 8:00 pm, WAC DN		at California Baptist	L 76–82	11–4 (0–1)	22 – Brown	16 – McCants	3 – Tied	CBU Events Center (3,304); Riverside, CA
Jan 10, 2019; 7:00 pm, AggieVision		Grand Canyon	W 77–75	12–4 (1–1)	20 – Aurrecoechea	11 – Aurrecoechea	7 – Harris	Pan American Center (5,482); Las Cruces, NM
Jan 12, 2019; 4:00 pm, WAC DN		Cal State Bakersfield	W 73–62	13–4 (2–1)	19 – Brown	11 – Chuha	8 – Buchanan	Pan American Center (4,702); Las Cruces, NM
Jan 17, 2019; 8:00 pm, ESPN+		at Seattle	W 87–60	14–4 (3–1)	13 – Chuha	10 – Chuha	4 – Harris	Redhawk Center (999); Seattle, WA
Jan 19, 2019; 7:00 pm, WAC DN		at Utah Valley	W 83–78	15–4 (4–1)	20 – Chuha	14 – Chuha	5 – Harris	UCCU Center (4,521); Orem, UT
Jan 26, 2019; 6:00 pm, WAC DN		at Texas–Rio Grande Valley	W 63–61	16–4 (5–1)	12 – Tied	6 – Chuha	5 – Queen	UTRGV Fieldhouse (1,104); Edinburg, TX
Jan 31, 2019; 7:00 pm, AggieVision		UMKC	W 70–54	17–4 (6–1)	15 – Brown	6 – Chuha	6 – Harris	Pan American Center (5,029); Las Cruces, NM
Feb 2, 2019; 4:00 pm, AggieVision		Chicago State	W 83–39	18–4 (7–1)	19 – Brown	10 – Thiam	3 – Tied	Pan American Center (5,375); Las Cruces, NM
Feb 7, 2019; 8:00 pm, ESPN3		at Cal State Bakersfield	W 71–70 ^{OT}	19–4 (8–1)	13 – Tied	11 – Chuha	4 – Chuha	Icardo Center (2,789); Bakersfield, CA
Feb 9, 2019; 7:00 pm, ESPN3		at Grand Canyon	W 67–64	20–4 (9–1)	15 – Chuha	7 – Tied	3 – Tied	GCU Arena (7,495); Phoenix, AZ
Feb 14, 2019; 7:00 pm, AggieVision		Utah Valley	W 84–77	21–4 (10–1)	21 – Chuha	10 – Chuha	4 – Buchanan	Pan American Center (4,628); Las Cruces, NM
Feb 16, 2019; 7:00 pm, AggieVision		Seattle	W 59–53	22–4 (11–1)	13 – Queen	5 – Tied	3 – Harris	Pan American Center (11,889); Las Cruces, NM
Feb 19, 2019*; 7:00 pm, WAC DN		Texas A&M International	W 80–42	23–4	14 – Tied	11 – Thiam	5 – Buchanan	Pan American Center (4,399); Las Cruces, NM
Feb 23, 2019; 4:00 pm, WAC DN		Texas–Rio Grande Valley	W 88–79	24–4 (12–1)	20 – Aurrecoechea	7 – Aurrecoechea	4 – Tied	Pan American Center (5,446); Las Cruces, NM
Feb 28, 2019; 5:00 pm, ESPN+		at UMKC	W 75–55	25–4 (13–1)	12 – Tied	7 – McCants	3 – Tied	Swinney Recreation Center (1,194); Kansas City, MO
Mar 2, 2019; 1:00 pm, WAC DN		at Chicago State	W 92–58	26–4 (14–1)	17 – Aurrecoechea	7 – Tied	4 – Bobbitt	Jones Convocation Center (555); Chicago, IL
Mar 9, 2019; 7:00 pm, WAC DN		California Baptist	W 75–63	27–4 (15–1)	18 – Queen	10 – Aurrecoechea	5 – Buchanan	Pan American Center (11,212); Las Cruces, NM
WAC tournament
Mar 14, 2019; 1:00 pm, ESPN+	(1)	vs. (8) Chicago State; Quarterfinals	W 86–49	28–4	14 – Chuha	8 – McCants	4 – Buchanan	Orleans Arena (2,374); Paradise, NV
Mar 15, 2019; 7:00 pm, ESPN+	(1)	vs. (4) Texas–Rio Grande Valley; Semifinals	W 79–72	29–4	19 – Brown	7 – Chuha	3 – Tied	Orleans Arena; Paradise, NV
Mar 16, 2019; 8:00 pm, ESPNU	(1)	vs. (3) Grand Canyon; Championship	W 89–57	30–4	27 – Queen	7 – Tied	9 – Harris	Orleans Arena (3,598); Paradise, NV
NCAA tournament
Mar 21, 2019*; 11:30 am, TNT	(12 MW)	vs. (5 MW) No. 14 Auburn; First Round	L 77–78	30–5	16 – McCants	9 – Aurrecoechea	5 – Brown	Vivint Smart Home Arena (16,576); Salt Lake City, UT
*Non-conference game. ^{#}Rankings from AP Poll. (#) Tournament seedings in parentheses. MW=Midwest. All times are in Mountain Time Source.
