= 2018–19 California Baptist Lancers men's basketball team =

American college basketball season

2018–19 California Baptist Lancers men's basketball

CBI, First round
- Conference: Western Athletic Conference
- Record: 16–15 (7–9 WAC)
- Head coach: Rick Croy (6th season)
- Assistant coaches: Hardy Asprilla; Josh Dunaj; Doc Wellman; Geoffrey McIntosh
- Home arena: CBU Events Center

2018–19 WAC men's basketball standings
	Conf.				Overall
Team	W		L	PCT	W		L	PCT
New Mexico State †	15	–	1	.938	30	–	5	.857
Utah Valley	12	–	4	.750	25	–	10	.714
Grand Canyon	10	–	6	.625	20	–	14	.588
Texas–Rio Grande Valley	9	–	7	.563	20	–	17	.541
California Baptist *	7	–	9	.438	16	–	15	.516
Cal State Bakersfield	7	–	9	.438	18	–	16	.529
Seattle	6	–	10	.375	18	–	15	.545
UMKC	6	–	10	.375	11	–	21	.344
Chicago State	0	–	16	.000	3	–	29	.094
† 2019 WAC tournament winner * Ineligible for WAC tournament (reclassification from NCAA Division II)

The 2018–19 California Baptist Lancers men's basketball team represented California Baptist University during the 2018–19 NCAA Division I men's basketball season. They were led by head coach Rick Croy who was in his sixth season at California Baptist. The Lancers played their home games at the CBU Events Center in Riverside, California as members of the Western Athletic Conference.

This season was CBU's first of a four-year transition period from Division II to Division I. As a result, the Lancers were not eligible for NCAA postseason play and did not participate in the WAC tournament. They were eligible to play in the CollegeInsider.com Postseason Tournament or College Basketball Invitational. They finished the season 16–15, 7–9 in WAC play to finish in a tie for fifth place. The Lancers accepted an invitation to play in the CBI where they were defeated in the first round by Loyola Marymount.

== Departures ==
=== Incoming recruits ===
- Adam Hess (6'5, Guard)
- Glenn Morison (6'10, Forward)

== Roster ==
2018–19 California Baptist Lancers men's basketball team
Players
Coaches

Pos.	#	Name	Height	Weight	Year	Previous school	Hometown
G	0	Milan Acquaah	6 ft 2 in (1.88 m)	185 lb (84 kg)	Jr	Cathedral HS/Washington State	Los Angeles, CA
G	2	Marquise Mosley	5 ft 9 in (1.75 m)	170 lb (77 kg)	RS Jr	Renaissance Academy (Los Angeles)	Pasadena, CA
F	4	Omar Lo (W)	6 ft 9 in (2.06 m)	209 lb (95 kg)	Sr	RFK Community Schools/Peninsula College (WA)	Calabasas, CA
G	5	Jeremy Smith	6 ft 0 in (1.83 m)	165 lb (75 kg)	Jr	Great Oak HS/Citrus College	Temecula, CA
G	10	Adam Hess	6 ft 5 in (1.96 m)	195 lb (88 kg)	Fr	Westlake HS	Thousand Oaks, CA
F	11	Bul Kuol	6 ft 7 in (2.01 m)	210 lb (95 kg)	Jr	Lake Ginninderra College	Canberra, ACT, Australia
C	12	Glenn Morison	6 ft 10 in (2.08 m)	230 lb (104 kg)	Fr	Lake Ginninderra College	Belconnen, ACT, Australia
G	15	Jordan Heading	6 ft 2 in (1.88 m)	190 lb (86 kg)	RS Sr	Sunrise Christian School	Adelaide, ACT, South Australia
F	22	Ty Rowell	6 ft 2 in (1.88 m)	180 lb (82 kg)	So	Walnut Grove School	Langley, BC
G	23	Jordan Gonzalez	6 ft 2 in (1.88 m)	185 lb (84 kg)	RS Fr	Bishop Amat Memorial HS	Pasadena, CA
F	24	Mike Henn	6 ft 8 in (2.03 m)	230 lb (104 kg)	RS So	Bellevue HS/UC Davis	Bellevue, WA
G	31	Ferron Flowers Jr.	6 ft 4 in (1.93 m)	180 lb (82 kg)	Jr	Federal Way HS/South Mountain CC (AZ)	Federal Way, WA
G	32	Micah Robinson (W)	6 ft 4 in (1.93 m)	180 lb (82 kg)	RS Jr	Damien HS/Chaffey College	Rancho Cucamonga, CA
C	33	Zach Pirog	6 ft 11 in (2.11 m)	225 lb (102 kg)	RS Jr	ThunderRidge HS/Nebraska-Omaha	Highlands Ranch, CO
F	35	De'Jon Davis	6 ft 7 in (2.01 m)	225 lb (102 kg)	Jr	Oakland Tech HS	Oakland, CA

Head coach

- Rick Croy (Azusa Pacific)

Assistant coach(es)

- Hardy Asprilla (Cal State Fullerton)
- Josh Dunaj (Azusa Pacific)
- Doc Wellman (Azusa Pacific)
- Geoffrey McIntosh (Cal State Monterey Bay)

Legend

- (C) Team captain
- (S) Suspended
- (I) Ineligible
- (W) Walk-on
- Injured
- Current redshirt

Roster

== Schedule and results ==
Date time, TV	Opponent	Result	Record	High points	High rebounds	High assists	Site (attendance) city, state
Non-conference regular season
November 9, 2018*; 7:00 pm	San Diego Christian	W 87–71	1–0	22 – Acquaah	11 – Davis	8 – Heading	CBU Events Center (5,089); Riverside, CA
November 13, 2018*; 5:00 pm	at Oral Roberts; Summit/WAC Challenge	W 70–69	2–0	20 – Heading	8 – Morison	5 – Acquaah	Mabee Center (1,792); Tulsa, OK
November 16, 2018*; 10:00 am	at Tulsa; Las Vegas Holiday Invitational campus game	L 79–82	2–1	20 – Acquaah	8 – Tied	11 – Acquaah	Reynolds Center (6,330); Tulsa, OK
November 19, 2018*; 7:00 pm, Stadium	at No. 6 Nevada; Las Vegas Holiday Invitational campus game	L 55–90	2–2	12 – Tied	6 – Pirog	5 – Acquaah	Lawlor Events Center (9,395); Reno, NV
November 23, 2018*; 10:00 am	vs. Arkansas–Pine Bluff; Las Vegas Holiday Invitational regional semifinals	L 107–115 ^{3OT}	2–3	26 – Acquaah	8 – Heading	6 – Heading	Jack Stephens Center; Little Rock, AR
November 24, 2018*; 11:00 am	vs. Howard; Las Vegas Holiday Invitational regional 3rd place game	L 84–86	2–4	26 – Davis	11 – Davis	4 – Heading	Jack Stephens Center; Little Rock, AR
November 29, 2018*; 7:00 pm	at UC Riverside	W 80–70	3–4	24 – Acquaah	14 – Davis	3 – Heading	Student Recreation Center Arena (1,328); Riverside, CA
December 1, 2018*; 7:00 pm	Mississippi Valley State	W 107–71	4–4	30 – Acquaah	7 – Henn	5 – Tied	CBU Events Center (2,742); Riverside, CA
December 5, 2018*; 7:00 pm	UC Irvine	L 66–69	4–5	25 – Acquaah	10 – Davis	2 – Heading	CBU Events Center (2,833); Riverside, CA
December 8, 2018*; 7:00 pm	Caltech	W 87–48	5–5	15 – Henn	7 – Tied	2 – 3 tied	CBU Events Center (1,810); Riverside, CA
Dec 17, 2018*; 5:30 pm	at Southeastern Louisiana	W 73–52	6–5	24 – Heading	11 – Davis	3 – Acquaah	University Center (559); Hammond, LA
December 19, 2018*; 12:30 pm	at Southern	W 79–76	7–5	25 – Acquaah	9 – Davis	4 – Tied	F.G. Clark Center (201); Baton Rouge, LA
December 29, 2018*; 7:00 pm	La Verne	W 97–46	8–5	29 – Acquaah	11 – Acquaah	6 – Smith	CBU Events Center (1,640); Riverside, CA
WAC regular season
January 3, 2019; 7:00 pm	New Mexico State	W 82–76	9–5 (1–0)	36 – Acquaah	7 – Tied	3 – Heading	CBU Events Center (3,304); Riverside, CA
January 5, 2019; 7:00 pm	Texas–Rio Grande Valley	L 74–81	9–6 (1–1)	20 – Acquaah	9 – Tied	5 – Heading	CBU Events Center (2,461); Riverside, CA
January 10, 2019; 4:00 pm	at UMKC	L 68–84	9–7 (1–2)	23 – Heading	8 – Henn	3 – Rowell	Swinney Recreation Center (924); Kansas City, MO
January 12, 2019; 12:00 pm	at Chicago State	W 77–75	10–7 (2–2)	24 – Heading	10 – Davis	8 – Acquaah	Jones Convocation Center; Chicago, IL
January 24, 2019; 7:00 pm	Cal State Bakersfield	L 84–88	10–8 (2–3)	27 – Acquaah	7 – Davis	6 – Acquaah	CBU Events Center (3,005); Riverside, CA
January 26, 2019; 7:00 pm, ESPN+	Grand Canyon	L 73–90	10–9 (2–4)	15 – Tied	10 – Davis	4 – Acquaah	CBU Events Center (4,948); Riverside, CA
January 30, 2019; 6:00 pm	at Utah Valley	L 62–79	10–10 (2–5)	20 – Acquaah	5 – Tied	7 – Acquaah	UCCU Center (4,662); Orem, UT
February 2, 2019; 7:00 pm	at Seattle	W 75–64	11–10 (3–5)	22 – Heading	11 – Davis	3 – Acquaah	Redhawk Center (999); Seattle, WA
February 7, 2019; 7:00 pm	Chicago State	W 94–44	12–10 (4–5)	23 – Acquaah	8 – Davis	7 – Heading	CBU Events Center; Riverside, CA
February 9, 2019; 7:00 pm	UMKC	W 70–60	13–10 (5–5)	24 – Heading	12 – Davis	3 – Acquaah	CBU Events Center; Riverside, CA
February 12, 2019*; 7:00 pm	Bethesda	W 115–65	14–10	20 – Smith	14 – Davis	9 – Mosley	CBU Events Center; Riverside, CA
February 21, 2019; 7:00 pm, ESPN3	at Grand Canyon	L 58–91	14–11 (5–6)	15 – Heading	12 – Davis	3 – Acquaah	GCU Arena; Phoenix, AZ
February 23, 2019; 7:00 pm, ESPN3	at Cal State Bakersfield	W 72–58	15–11 (6–6)	28 – Heading	12 – Davis	8 – Acquaah	Icardo Center; Bakersfield, CA
February 28, 2019; 7:00 pm	Seattle	L 65–67	15–12 (6–7)	23 – Acquaah	13 – Davis	3 – Heading	CBU Events Center; Riverside, CA
March 2, 2019; 7:00 pm	Utah Valley	L 63–64	15–13 (6–8)	21 – Acquaah	8 – Pirog	4 – Smith	CBU Events Center; Riverside, CA
March 7, 2019; 7:00 pm	at Texas–Rio Grande Valley	W 82–79	16–13 (7–8)	26 – Heading	10 – Davis	4 – Mosley	UTRGV Fieldhouse (1,162); Edinburg, TX
March 9, 2019; 6:00 pm	at New Mexico State	L 63–75	16–14 (7–9)	18 – Davis	13 – Acquaah	3 – Acquaah	Pan American Center (11,212); Las Cruces, NM
College Basketball Invitational
March 20, 2019*; 7:00 pm, WAC DN	Loyola Marymount; First round	L 55–56	16–15	13 – Acquaah	13 – Davis	3 – Acquaah	CBU Events Center (2,346); Riverside, CA
*Non-conference game. ^{#}Rankings from AP Poll. (#) Tournament seedings in parentheses. All times are in Pacific Time.

== See also ==
- 2018–19 California Baptist Lancers women's basketball team
