= 2019 WAC men's basketball tournament =

- Classification: Division I
- Season: 2018–19
- Teams: 8
- Site: Orleans Arena; Paradise, Nevada
- Champions: New Mexico State (9th title)
- Winning coach: Chris Jans (2nd title)
- MVP: Trevelin Queen (New Mexico State)
- Television: ESPN3, ESPNU

2018–19 WAC men's basketball standings
	Conf.				Overall
Team	W		L	PCT	W		L	PCT
New Mexico State †	15	–	1	.938	30	–	5	.857
Utah Valley	12	–	4	.750	25	–	10	.714
Grand Canyon	10	–	6	.625	20	–	14	.588
Texas–Rio Grande Valley	9	–	7	.563	20	–	17	.541
California Baptist *	7	–	9	.438	16	–	15	.516
Cal State Bakersfield	7	–	9	.438	18	–	16	.529
Seattle	6	–	10	.375	18	–	15	.545
UMKC	6	–	10	.375	11	–	21	.344
Chicago State	0	–	16	.000	3	–	29	.094
† 2019 WAC tournament winner * Ineligible for WAC tournament (reclassification from NCAA Division II)

The 2019 WAC men's basketball tournament was the postseason men's basketball tournament for the Western Athletic Conference during the 2018–19 season. All tournament games were played at the Orleans Arena in Paradise, Nevada, from March 14–16, 2019. New Mexico State defeated Grand Canyon 89–57 in the championship to win the tournament, and received the conference's automatic bid to the 2019 NCAA tournament. The win was New Mexico State's WAC leading ninth championship, and seventh in the last eight seasons.

== Seeds ==
8 of the 9 teams in the WAC were eligible to compete in the conference tournament. California Baptist is ineligible due to their transition from Division II to Division I. Teams were seeded by record within the conference, with a tiebreaker system to seed teams with identical conference records.

Seed	School	Conference	Tiebreaker	Tiebreaker 2
1	New Mexico State	15–1		
2	Utah Valley	12–4		
3	Grand Canyon	10–6		
4	UTRGV	9–7		
5	Cal State Bakersfield	7–9		
6	Seattle	6–10	H2H and through the conference tied	Higher NET Rankings
7	UMKC	6–10	H2H and through the conference tied	Lower NET Rankings
8	Chicago State	0–16		

== Schedule and results ==
Game	Time	Matchup	Score	Television
Quarterfinals – Thursday, March 14
1	12:00 pm	No. 1 New Mexico State vs No. 8 Chicago State	86–49	ESPN+
2	2:30 pm	No. 4 UTRGV vs. No. 5 Cal State Bakersfield	85–70	ESPN+
3	6:00 pm	No. 2 Utah Valley vs. No. 7 UMKC	71–64	ESPN+
4	8:30 pm	No. 3 Grand Canyon vs. No. 6 Seattle	84–75	ESPN+
Semifinals – Friday, March 15
5	6:00 pm	No. 1 New Mexico State vs. No. 4 UTRGV	79–72	ESPN+
6	8:30 pm	No. 2 Utah Valley vs. No. 3 Grand Canyon	74–78	ESPN+
Final – Saturday, March 16
7	7:00 pm	No. 1 New Mexico State vs. No. 3 Grand Canyon	89–57	ESPNU
Game times in PDT. Rankings denote tournament seed.

== Bracket ==
Quarterfinals; March 14; ESPN3
1	New Mexico State	86
8	Chicago State	49
4	UTRGV	85
5	Cal State Bakersfield	70
2	Utah Valley	71
7	UMKC	64
3	Grand Canyon	84
6	Seattle	75

Semifinals; March 15; ESPN3
1	New Mexico State	79
4	UTRGV	72
2	Utah Valley	74
3	Grand Canyon	78

Championship; March 16; ESPNU
1	New Mexico State	89
3	Grand Canyon	57
