= 2018–19 Utah Valley Wolverines men's basketball team =

American college basketball season

2018–19 Utah Valley Wolverines men's basketball

MGM Resorts Main Event Middleweight champions

CBI, Quarterfinals
- Conference: Western Athletic Conference
- Record: 25–10 (12–4 WAC)
- Head coach: Mark Pope (4th season)
- Assistant coaches: Cody Fueger; Chris Burgess; Eric Daniels
- Home arena: UCCU Center

2018–19 WAC men's basketball standings
	Conf.				Overall
Team	W		L	PCT	W		L	PCT
New Mexico State †	15	–	1	.938	30	–	5	.857
Utah Valley	12	–	4	.750	25	–	10	.714
Grand Canyon	10	–	6	.625	20	–	14	.588
Texas–Rio Grande Valley	9	–	7	.563	20	–	17	.541
California Baptist *	7	–	9	.438	16	–	15	.516
Cal State Bakersfield	7	–	9	.438	18	–	16	.529
Seattle	6	–	10	.375	18	–	15	.545
UMKC	6	–	10	.375	11	–	21	.344
Chicago State	0	–	16	.000	3	–	29	.094
† 2019 WAC tournament winner * Ineligible for WAC tournament (reclassification from NCAA Division II)

The 2018–19 Utah Valley Wolverines men's basketball team represented Utah Valley University in the 2018–19 NCAA Division I men's basketball season. The Wolverines, led by fourth-year head coach Mark Pope, played their home games at the UCCU Center in Orem, Utah as members of the Western Athletic Conference. They finished the season 25–10, 12–4 in WAC play to finish in second place. They defeated UMKC in the quarterfinals of the WAC tournament before losing in the semifinals to Grand Canyon. They were invited to the College Basketball Invitational where they defeated Cal State Northridge in the first round before losing in the quarterfinals to South Florida.

== Previous season ==
The Wolverines finished the 2017–18 season 23–11, 10–4 in WAC play to finish in second place. They defeated Cal State Bakersfield in the quarterfinals of the WAC tournament before losing in the semifinals to Grand Canyon. They were invited to the College Basketball Invitational where they defeated Eastern Washington in the first round before losing in the quarterfinals to San Francisco.

== Roster ==
2018–19 Utah Valley Wolverines men's basketball team
Players
Coaches

Pos.	#	Name	Height	Weight	Year	Previous school	Hometown
G	00	Brandon Averette	5 ft 11 in (1.8 m)	185 lb (84 kg)	RS Fr	Richardson HS	Richardson, TX
G	0	Isaiah White	6 ft 7 in (2.01 m)	205 lb (93 kg)	So	Damien HS	Rancho Cucamonga, CA
G	2	Jake Toolson	6 ft 5 in (1.96 m)	205 lb (93 kg)	RS Jr	Highland; BYU	Gilbert, AZ
G	3	T. J. Washington	6 ft 0 in (1.83 m)	175 lb (79 kg)	Jr	Jenks	Tulsa, OK
G	4	Cache Fields	6 ft 5 in (1.96 m)	185 lb (84 kg)	Fr	Pinewood School	Palo Alto, CA
G	5	Hayden Scheneck	6 ft 4 in (1.93 m)	195 lb (88 kg)	RS Jr	Weber; Salt Lake CC	Eden, UT
G	10	Ben Nakwaasah	6 ft 2 in (1.88 m)	175 lb (79 kg)	Sr	Richardson; Jacksonville College	Richardson, TX
G	11	Connor Toolson	6 ft 4 in (1.93 m)	185 lb (84 kg)	Sr	Lone Peak; Jacksonville College	Highland, UT
F	15	Connor MacDougall	6 ft 9 in (2.06 m)	240 lb (109 kg)	Sr	Corona del Sol; South Mountain CC; Arizona State; New Mexico	Tempe, AZ
G	20	Drew Cotton	6 ft 2 in (1.88 m)	180 lb (82 kg)	Fr	Mountain View	Tucson, AZ
G	21	Ege Havsa	6 ft 4 in (1.93 m)	165 lb (75 kg)	RS Fr	Esenyurt Okyanus	Istanbul, Turkey
G/F	22	Casdon Jardine	6 ft 7 in (2.01 m)	218 lb (99 kg)	RS Fr	Twin Falls HS	Twin Falls, ID
F	25	Wyatt Lowell	6 ft 10 in (2.08 m)	205 lb (93 kg)	Fr	Williams Field	Gilbert, AZ
C	44	Baylee Steele (redshirt)	6 ft 11 in (2.11 m)	245 lb (111 kg)	RS Jr	Norwalk; Eastern Michigan	Norwalk, IA
C	55	Richard Harward	6 ft 11 in (2.11 m)	255 lb (116 kg)	So	Orem	Orem, UT

Head coach

- Mark Pope (Kentucky)

Assistant coach(es)

- Cody Fueger (Utah)
- Chris Burgess (Utah)
- Eric Daniels (Johnson & Wales)

Legend

- (C) Team captain
- (S) Suspended
- (I) Ineligible
- (W) Walk-on
- Injured
- Current redshirt

Roster
Last update: November 7, 2018

== Schedule and results ==
Date time, TV	Rank^{#}	Opponent^{#}	Result	Record	Site (attendance) city, state
Exhibition
October 30, 2018*; 7:00pm, WAC DN		Dixie State	W 88–70		UCCU Center; Orem, UT
Non-conference regular season
Nov 6, 2018*; 7:00 pm, UVUtv		Westminster (UT)	W 96–71	1–0	UCCU Center (4,327); Orem, UT
Nov 9, 2018*; 8:00 pm, BYUtv		at BYU; UCCU Crosstown Clash	L 65–75	1–1	Marriott Center (14,628); Provo, UT
Nov 11, 2018*; 6:00 pm, TheW.tv		at Saint Mary's; MGM Resorts Main Event campus-site game	L 63–92	1–2	McKeon Pavilion (2,751); Moraga, CA
Nov 16, 2018*; 7:00 pm, MW Net		at Utah State; MGM Resort Main Event campus-site game	L 46–65	1–3	Smith Spectrum (6,474); Logan, UT
Nov 19, 2018*; 12:00 pm, BD Global		vs. Hartford; MGM Resorts Main Event Middleweight semifinal	W 72–65	2–3	Cox Pavilion; Paradise, NV
Nov 21, 2018*; 3:00 pm, BD Global		vs. Long Beach State; MGM Resorts Main Event Middleweight championship	W 87–72	3–3	Cox Pavilion; Paradise, NV
Nov 24, 2018*; 4:00 pm, WAC DN		North Dakota	W 74–68	4–3	UCCU Center (1,938); Orem, UT
Nov 28, 2018*; 7:00 pm, UVUtv		Western State Colorado	W 82–59	5–3	UCCU Center (1,703); Orem, UT
Dec 1, 2018*; 7:00 pm, UVUtv		Denver; Summit League/WAC Challenge	W 98–75	6–3	UCCU Center (2,613); Orem, UT
Dec 6, 2018*; 7:00 pm, P12N		at Arizona	L 69–80	6–4	McKale Center (13,724); Tucson, AZ
Dec 8, 2018*; 6:00 pm, KASW		at Northern Arizona	W 98–78	7–4	Walkup Skydome (1,532); Flagstaff, AZ
Dec 15, 2018*; 7:00 pm, KJZZ		at Weber State	W 75–63	8–4	Dee Events Center (7,021); Ogden, UT
Dec 19, 2018*; 7:00 pm, WAC DN		Idaho State	W 88–77	9–4	UCCU Center (1,994); Orem, UT
Dec 22, 2018*; 2:00 pm, WAC DN		Sam Houston State	W 85–79	10–4	UCCU Center (1,920); Orem, UT
Dec 29, 2018*; 5:00 pm, MW Net		at Fresno State	W 64–60	11–4	Save Mart Center (5,217); Fresno, CA
WAC regular season
Jan 3, 2019; 6:00 pm, ESPN3		at Grand Canyon	L 60–71	11–5 (0–1)	GCU Arena (7,205); Phoenix, AZ
Jan 5, 2019; 8:00 pm, ESPN3		at Cal State Bakersfield	L 71–73	11–6 (0–2)	Icardo Center (2,677); Bakersfield, CA
Jan 12, 2019; 7:00 pm, WAC DN		Seattle	W 88–78	12–6 (1–2)	UCCU Center (3,258); Orem, UT
Jan 17, 2019; 7:00 pm, UVUtv		Texas–Rio Grande Valley	W 82–61	13–6 (2–2)	UCCU Center (1,907); Orem, UT
Jan 19, 2019; 7:00 pm, UVUtv		New Mexico State	L 78–83	13–7 (2–3)	UCCU Center (4,521); Orem, UT
Jan 24, 2019; 5:00 pm, WAC DN		at UMKC	W 75–67	14–7 (3–3)	Swinney Recreation Center (1,076); Kansas City, MO
Jan 26, 2019; 1:00 pm, WAC DN		at Chicago State	W 74–60	15–7 (4–3)	Jones Convocation Center (400); Chicago, IL
Jan 30, 2019; 7:00 pm, WAC DN		California Baptist	W 79–62	16–7 (5–3)	UCCU Center (4,662); Orem, UT
Feb 14, 2019; 7:00 pm, WAC DN		at New Mexico State	L 77–84	16–8 (5–4)	Pan American Center (4,628); Las Cruces, NM
Feb 16, 2019; 6:00 pm, WAC DN		at Texas–Rio Grande Valley	W 76–64	17–8 (6–4)	UTRGV Fieldhouse (1,123); Edinburg, TX
Feb 21, 2019; 7:00 pm, ESPN+		Chicago State	W 103–71	18–8 (7–4)	UCCU Center (2,898); Orem, UT
Feb 23, 2019; 7:00 pm, WAC DN		UMKC	W 79–67	19–8 (8–4)	UCCU Center (3,805); Orem, UT
Feb 26, 2019; 8:00 pm, WAC DN		at Seattle	W 77–68	20–8 (9–4)	Redhawk Center (956); Seattle, WA
Mar 2, 2019; 8:00 pm, WAC DN		at California Baptist	W 64–63	21–8 (10–4)	CBU Events Center (4,346); Riverside, CA
Mar 7, 2019; 7:00 pm, UVUtv		Grand Canyon	W 82–70	22–8 (11–4)	UCCU Center (3,897); Orem, UT
Mar 9, 2019; 7:00 pm, ESPN+		Cal State Bakersfield	W 76–61	23–8 (12–4)	UCCU Center (4,167); Orem, UT
WAC tournament
Mar 14, 2019; 7:00 pm, ESPN+	(2)	vs. (7) UMKC; Quarterfinals	W 71–64	24–8	Orleans Arena; Paradise, NV
Mar 15, 2019; 9:30 pm, ESPN+	(2)	vs. (3) Grand Canyon; Semifinals	L 74–78	24–9	Orleans Arena; Paradise, NV
College Basketball Invitational
Mar 19, 2019*; 7:00 pm, WAC DN		Cal State Northridge; First round	W 86–82	25–9	UCCU Center (375); Orem, UT
Mar 25, 2019*; 7:00 pm, Bullvision		at South Florida; Quarterfinals	L 57–66	25–10	Yuengling Center (1,679); Tampa, FL
*Non-conference game. ^{#}Rankings from AP Poll. (#) Tournament seedings in parentheses. All times are in Mountain Time.
