= Trevelin Queen =

American basketball player (born 1997)

- With the Lokomotiv Kuban (2026)

No. 10 – Lokomotiv Kuban
- Position: Shooting guard
- League: VTB United League

Personal information
- Born: February 25, 1997 (age 29) Baltimore, Maryland, U.S.
- Listed height: 6 ft 5 in (1.96 m)
- Listed weight: 190 lb (86 kg)

Career information
- High school: North County (Glen Burnie, Maryland)
- College: Marin (2016–2017); New Mexico Military (2017–2018); New Mexico State (2018–2020)
- NBA draft: 2020: undrafted
- Playing career: 2020–present

Career history
- 2020-2021: Rio Grande Valley Vipers
- 2021–2022: Houston Rockets
- 2021–2022: →Rio Grande Valley Vipers
- 2022–2023: Indiana Pacers
- 2022–2023: →Fort Wayne Mad Ants
- 2023–2025: Orlando Magic
- 2023–2025: →Osceola Magic
- 2025–2026: Guangdong Southern Tigers
- 2026–present: Lokomotiv Kuban

Career highlights
- NBA G League champion (2022); NBA G League Finals MVP (2022); NBA G League Most Valuable Player (2022); All-NBA G League First Team (2022); All-NBA G League Second Team (2024); NBA G League All-Defensive Team (2022); 3× NBA G League Next Up Game (2023–2025); NBA G League Next Up Game MVP (2024); Second-team All-WAC (2020); WAC tournament MVP (2019); All-WJCAC Team (2018)
- Stats at NBA.com
- Stats at Basketball Reference

Trevelin Marleto Queen (born February 25, 1997) is an American professional basketball player for Lokomotiv Kuban of the VTB United League. He has previously played in the National Basketball Association (NBA) for the Houston Rockets, Indiana Pacers, and Orlando Magic. He played college basketball for the New Mexico State Aggies, as well as at College of Marin and New Mexico Military Institute.

== Early life ==
Queen began playing basketball at the age of four at a hoop in his garage. He played shortstop and pitcher on the baseball field growing up, which he said was his best sport. Queen played football for the FAB Phenoms Amateur Athletic Union (AAU) program. He played basketball for North County High School in his hometown of Glen Burnie, Maryland. He began playing for the varsity team as a sophomore for the final playoff game of the season. Queen moved to a high school in Florida for his junior season but was not allowed to play basketball because he had transferred too late. Queen returned to North County as a senior and played nine games. He had no college basketball offers by the end of his high school career.

== College career ==
Queen originally planned to attend Prince George's Community College due to a mutual relationship between the school's basketball coach and his AAU coach, but he redshirted his first season because of paperwork issues. He began playing college basketball at College of Marin in Marin County, California. While attending the school, Queen lived in crowded conditions at a retirement home before he and his roommates were kicked out. For one week, he lived with three teammates in a car in East Oakland, before moving into the home of his teammate's relative. Queen scored a freshman season-high 29 points, to go with 11 rebounds and eight steals, in a December 10, 2016 win over Feather River College. In 14 games with Marin, he averaged a team-high 21.3 points, 7.9 rebounds and 2.4 assists per game.

As a sophomore, Queen moved to New Mexico Military Institute in Roswell, New Mexico upon his family's advice. In his season debut, he scored 40 points in a November 1, 2017 victory over Northern New Mexico JV. On November 4, Queen recorded a season-high 41 points in a loss to New Mexico Junior College. By the end of the season, he was averaging 26 points, which ranked fourth in the National Junior College Athletic Association, to go with 7.3 rebounds and 2.2 assists per game. Queen was selected to the All-Western Junior College Athletic Conference team. He committed to play NCAA Division I basketball for Western Kentucky and enrolled at the school but departed in September 2018. He later committed to New Mexico State.

As a junior, Queen averaged 7.8 points, 2.9 rebounds and 1.7 assists per game as one of the top reserves for the Aggies. He scored a season-high 27 points in the WAC tournament title game against Grand Canyon. He was named the 2019 WAC tournament MVP. In the first round of the 2019 NCAA tournament, he scored 14 points but missed a potential game-winning three-pointer in a 78–77 loss to fifth-seeded Auburn, who would advance to the Final Four. As a senior, Queen averaged 13.2 points and 5.2 rebounds per game and was one of the top defenders in the conference. He missed three weeks with a knee injury. Queen was named to the Second Team All-WAC. He scored a season-high 23 points and nine rebounds on November 22, 2019, in a 78–77 loss to New Mexico.

== Professional career ==
=== Rio Grande Valley Vipers (2020-2021) ===
After going undrafted in the 2020 NBA draft, Queen signed with the Houston Rockets on November 12, 2020. He was waived in training camp on December 16. He then joined the Rockets' NBA G League affiliate, the Rio Grande Valley Vipers, making his debut on February 10, 2021. Queen averaged 10 points, 2.3 rebounds, 1.2 assists and 1.2 steals per game, shooting 45.8 percent from the floor.

On September 29, 2021, Queen signed a partially guaranteed training camp deal with the Los Angeles Lakers, but was waived on October 15. Queen subsequently rejoined the Rio Grande Valley Vipers. In 10 games, he averaged 22.0 points, 6.3 rebounds, 4.1 assists, 3.0 steals and 2.6 three-pointers made.

=== Houston Rockets (2021–2022) ===
On December 18, 2021, Queen signed a two-way contract with the Houston Rockets. On April 7, 2022, he was named the 2021–22 NBA G League Most Valuable Player.

On July 1, 2022, Queen signed a two-year, $3.5 million contract with the Philadelphia 76ers. Queen was waived by the 76ers after suffering a head injury in an opening preseason game.

=== Indiana Pacers (2022–2023) ===
On October 11, 2022, Queen signed a two-way contract with the Indiana Pacers, splitting time with their G League affiliate, the Fort Wayne Mad Ants. He was named to the G League's inaugural Next Up Game for the 2022–23 season. On March 27, 2023, the G League suspended Queen for one game without pay for directing threatening language toward a game official in a 125–121 win over the Delaware Blue Coats two days earlier. This caused him to miss the Mad Ants' first-round playoff game against the Capital City Go-Go, which the Mad Ants lost.

On March 29, the Pacers waived Queen.

=== Orlando Magic (2023–2025) ===
On September 12, 2023, Queen signed with the Orlando Magic and on October 21, his deal was converted into a two-way contract.

On July 5, 2024, Queen signed another two-way contract with Orlando. On April 11, 2025, he scored a career-high 25 points and made five 3-pointers in the Magic's 129–115 win over the Indiana Pacers. He made 32 appearances (two starts) for Orlando during the 2024–25 NBA season, averaging 4.9 points, 1.7 rebounds, and 1.2 assists.

=== Guangdong Southern Tigers (2025–2026) ===
On September 18, 2025, Queen signed with the Guangdong Southern Tigers of the Chinese Basketball Association.

=== Lokomotiv Kuban (2026–present) ===
On July 31, 2026, Queen signed with PBC Lokomotiv Kuban of the Russian VTB United League.

== Career statistics ==
Legend
| GP | Games played | GS | Games started | MPG | Minutes per game |
| FG% | Field goal percentage | 3P% | 3-point field goal percentage | FT% | Free throw percentage |
| RPG | Rebounds per game | APG | Assists per game | SPG | Steals per game |
| BPG | Blocks per game | PPG | Points per game | **Bold** | Career high |

=== NBA ===
==== Regular season ====
| Year | Team | GP | GS | MPG | FG% | 3P% | FT% | RPG | APG | SPG | BPG | PPG |
|---|---|---|---|---|---|---|---|---|---|---|---|---|
| 2021–22 | Houston | 10 | 0 | 7.4 | **.455** | **.375** | **1.000** | 1.6 | .4 | .5 | .1 | 4.3 |
| 2022–23 | Indiana | 7 | 0 | 10.0 | .241 | .133 | **1.000** | **2.4** | .9 | .3 | **.7** | 3.0 |
| 2023–24 | Orlando | 14 | 0 | 11.8 | .368 | .176 | .750 | 1.4 | **1.3** | .5 | .4 | 2.9 |
| 2024–25 | Orlando | **31** | **2** | **13.9** | .381 | .286 | .857 | 1.7 | 1.2 | **1.0** | .3 | **4.9** |
| Career | | 62 | 2 | 11.9 | .372 | .271 | .857 | 1.7 | 1.1 | .7 | .3 | 4.1 |

=== College ===
| Year | Team | GP | GS | MPG | FG% | 3P% | FT% | RPG | APG | SPG | BPG | PPG |
|---|---|---|---|---|---|---|---|---|---|---|---|---|
| 2018–19 | New Mexico State | 25 | 0 | 15.2 | **.475** | .350 | .615 | 2.9 | 1.7 | 1.0 | **.8** | 7.8 |
| 2019–20 | New Mexico State | **26** | **25** | **27.5** | .471 | **.387** | **.814** | **5.2** | **2.4** | **1.7** | .3 | **13.2** |
| Career | | 51 | 25 | 21.5 | .472 | .373 | .739 | 4.1 | 2.1 | 1.4 | .5 | 10.5 |
