= 2018–19 Texas–Rio Grande Valley Vaqueros men's basketball team =

American college basketball season

2018–19 Texas–Rio Grande Valley Vaqueros men's basketball
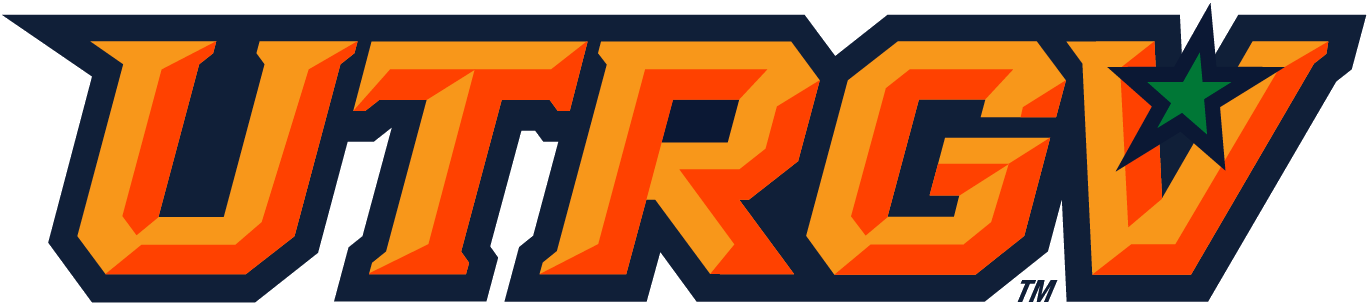

CIT, Second round
- Conference: Western Athletic Conference
- Record: 20–17 (9–7 WAC)
- Head coach: Lew Hill (3rd season)
- Assistant coaches: Jai Steadman; Kenya Crandell; Luke Mackay
- Home arena: UTRGV Fieldhouse

2018–19 WAC men's basketball standings
| | Conf. | | | | Overall |
| Team | W | | L | PCT | W | | L | PCT |
|---|---|---|---|---|---|---|---|---|
| New Mexico State † | 15 | – | 1 | .938 | 30 | – | 5 | .857 |
| Utah Valley | 12 | – | 4 | .750 | 25 | – | 10 | .714 |
| Grand Canyon | 10 | – | 6 | .625 | 20 | – | 14 | .588 |
| Texas–Rio Grande Valley | 9 | – | 7 | .563 | 20 | – | 17 | .541 |
| California Baptist * | 7 | – | 9 | .438 | 16 | – | 15 | .516 |
| Cal State Bakersfield | 7 | – | 9 | .438 | 18 | – | 16 | .529 |
| Seattle | 6 | – | 10 | .375 | 18 | – | 15 | .545 |
| UMKC | 6 | – | 10 | .375 | 11 | – | 21 | .344 |
| Chicago State | 0 | – | 16 | .000 | 3 | – | 29 | .094 |
† 2019 WAC tournament winner * Ineligible for WAC tournament (reclassification from NCAA Division II)

The 2018–19 Texas–Rio Grande Valley Vaqueros men's basketball team represented the University of Texas Rio Grande Valley during the 2018–19 NCAA Division I men's basketball season. The Vaqueros, led by third-year head coach Lew Hill, played their home games at the UTRGV Fieldhouse, with one home game at Bert Ogden Arena, as members of the Western Athletic Conference (WAC). With their win on February 28, the Vaqueros clinched a winning regular season record for the first time since the 2007–08 season. They finished the season 20–17, 9–7 in WAC play, to finish in fourth place. They defeated Cal State Bakersfield in the quarterfinals of the WAC tournament before losing in the semifinals to New Mexico State. They were invited to the CollegeInsider.com Tournament where they defeated Grambling State in the first round before losing in the second round to Texas Southern.

== Previous season ==
They finished the 2017–18 season 15–18, 6–8 in WAC play to finish in fifth place. They lost in the quarterfinals of the WAC tournament to Seattle. They were invited to the College Basketball Invitational where they lost in the first round to New Orleans.

== Roster ==
2018–19 Texas–Rio Grande Valley Vaqueros men's basketball team
Players
Coaches

| Pos. | # | Name | Height | Weight | Year | Previous school | Hometown |
|---|---|---|---|---|---|---|---|
| G | 0 | Greg Bowie II (C) | 6 ft 3 in (1.91 m) | 165 lb (75 kg) | So | Athlos Leadership Academy | San Antonio, TX |
| C | 2 | Solomon Hainna | 6 ft 7 in (2.01 m) | 200 lb (91 kg) | Sr | Palisades; Midland College; Evansville | Inglewood, CA |
| G | 3 | Quinton Johnson II | 6 ft 4 in (1.93 m) | 240 lb (109 kg) | Fr | Centennial HS | Oklahoma City, OK |
| F | 3 | Terry Winn (C) | 6 ft 7 in (2.01 m) | 240 lb (109 kg) | RS Sr | Westwind Preparatory Academy; UTEP | Monroe, LA |
| F | 5 | Jamal Gaines | 6 ft 8 in (2.03 m) | 215 lb (98 kg) | Fr | Universal Academy | Dallas, TX |
| G | 10 | Nick Mora | 6 ft 1 in (1.85 m) | 167 lb (76 kg) | Jr | Weslaco HS | Weslaco, TX |
| F | 11 | Lesley Varner II | 6 ft 7 in (2.01 m) | 185 lb (84 kg) | Jr | Cedar Hill | Dallas, TX |
| F | 12 | Ndene Gueye | 6 ft 10 in (2.08 m) | 230 lb (104 kg) | RS Jr | Redemption Christian Academy; Kilgore College | Dakar, Senegal |
| G | 14 | Javon Levi | 5 ft 10 in (1.78 m) | 165 lb (75 kg) | So | Shoemaker | Killeen, TX |
| G | 15 | Uche Dibiamaka | 6 ft 3 in (1.91 m) | 200 lb (91 kg) | Fr | Second Baptist School | Adelaide, Australia |
| C | 20 | Johnny Crnograc | 7 ft 1 in (2.16 m) | 225 lb (102 kg) | RS Sr | Marshall Academy; SW Tennessee CC | Sydney, Australia |
| F | 21 | Isaiah Fontaine | 6 ft 9 in (2.06 m) | 200 lb (91 kg) | Jr | Brimmer and May School; Southern; Tyler Junior College | Chelsea, MA |
| G | 22 | Jordan Jackson | 6 ft 3 in (1.91 m) | 180 lb (82 kg) | RS Jr | St. Pius X Midland College | Houston, TX |
| G | G | Tyson Smith (C) | 6 ft 1 in (1.85 m) | 185 lb (84 kg) | Sr | Westwind Prep; Southern Idaho; Loyola Chicago | Baltimore, MD |
| G | 24 | Marlon Williams | 6 ft 2 in (1.88 m) | 188 lb (85 kg) | Fr | United | Laredo, TX |

Head coach

- Lew Hill (Wichita State)

Assistant coach(es)

- Jai Steadman (Nebraska)
- Kenya Crandell (Nebraska–Kearney)
- Luke Mackay (East Carolina)

Legend

- (C) Team captain
- (S) Suspended
- (I) Ineligible
- (W) Walk-on
- Injured
- Current redshirt

Roster
Last update: June 5, 2024

== Schedule and results ==
The Vaqueros's schedule was released on August 7, 2018. The team played a two-game foreign exhibition series in Costa Rica in August.

| Date time, TV | Rank^{#} | Opponent^{#} | Result | Record | Site (attendance) city, state |
Costa Rica Foreign Tour
| Aug 18, 2018*; 7:30 p.m. | | vs. Coopenae San Ramon ARBA | W 85–56 | | San José, Costa Rica |
| Aug 19, 2018*; 7:30 p.m. | | Costa Rica national team | W 87–68 | | San José, Costa Rica |
Regular season
| November 6, 2018*; 7:00 p.m., WAC DN | | Texas A&M–Commerce | W 91–84 | 1–0 | UTRGV Fieldhouse (1,032); Edinburg, TX |
| November 9, 2018*; 7:30 p.m., FSSW+/FCS-P | | Oklahoma | L 76–91 | 1–1 | Bert Ogden Arena (5,071); Edinburg, TX |
| November 12, 2018*; 7:00 p.m., KDF | | at Texas A&M–Corpus Christi; South Texas Showcase | W 76–69 | 2–1 | American Bank Center (1,160); Corpus Christi, TX |
| November 14, 2018*; 7:00 p.m., WAC DN | | Prairie View A&M | W 70–57 | 3–1 | UTRGV Fieldhouse (416); Edinburg, TX |
| November 19, 2018*; 6:00 p.m. | | at East Carolina | L 64–69 | 3–2 | Williams Arena (3,144); Greenville, NC |
| November 21, 2018*; 6:30 p.m., ACCN Extra | | at Georgia Tech | L 44–72 | 3–3 | McCamish Pavilion (4,175); Atlanta, GA |
| November 23, 2018*; 7:00 p.m., WAC DN | | Lamar | W 77–75 | 4–3 | UTRGV Fieldhouse (424); Edinburg, TX |
| November 26, 2019*; 7:00 p.m., WAC DN | | Texas A&M–Corpus Christi | W 68–59 | 5–3 | UTRGV Fieldhouse (695); Edinburg, TX |
| November 28, 2018*; 7:00 p.m. | | at Houston | L 53–58 | 5–4 | H&PE Arena (3,972); Houston, TX |
| December 1, 2018*; 7:00 p.m., ESPN+ | | at UT Arlington | W 76–65 | 6–4 | College Park Center (1,330); Arlington, TX |
| December 5, 2018*; 7:00 p.m., WAC DN | | North Dakota; Summit League/WAC Challenge | W 70–56 | 7–4 | UTRGV Fieldhouse (527); Edinburg, TX |
| December 15, 2018*; 7:00 p.m., WAC DN | | Texas State | L 68–77 | 7–5 | UTRGV Fieldhouse (733); Edinburg, TX |
| December 18, 2018*; 7:00 p.m., WAC DN | | Rice | L 67–75 | 7–6 | UTRGV Fieldhouse (418); Edinburg, TX |
| December 22, 2018*; 7:00 p.m., WAC DN | | McNeese State | W 68–64 | 8–6 | UTRGV Fieldhouse (456); Edinburg, TX |
| December 28, 2018*; 6:00 p.m., FSSW+ | | at No. 11 Texas Tech | L 46–71 | 8–7 | United Supermarkets Arena (11,418); Lubbock, TX |
| January 3, 2019*; 9:00 p.m., Big West TV | | at UC Irvine | L 74–85 | 8–8 | Bren Events Center (1,694); Irvine, CA |
| January 5, 2019; 9:00 p.m., WAC DN | | at California Baptist | W 81–74 | 9–8 (1–0) | CBU Events Center (2,461); Riverside, CA |
| January 10, 2019; 7:00 p.m., WAC DN | | Cal State Bakersfield | W 75–69 | 9–9 (1–1) | UTRGV Fieldhouse (802); Edinburg, TX |
| January 12, 2019; 7:00 p.m., ESPN+ | | Grand Canyon | L 65–69 | 9–10 (1–2) | UTRGV Fieldhouse (725); Edinburg, TX |
| January 17, 2019; 8:00 p.m., WAC DN | | at Utah Valley | L 61–82 | 9–11 (1–3) | UCCU Center (1,907); Orem, UT |
| January 19, 2019; 9:00 p.m., WAC DN | | at Seattle | W 67–62 | 10–11 (2–3) | Redhawk Center (999); Seattle, WA |
| January 26, 2019; 7:00 p.m., WAC DN | | New Mexico State | L 61–63 | 10–12 (2–4) | UTRGV Fieldhouse (1,104); Edinburg, TX |
| January 31, 2019; 7:00 p.m., WAC DN | | Chicago State | W 77–46 | 11–12 (3–4) | UTRGV Fieldhouse (1,056); Edinburg, TX |
| February 2, 2019; 7:00 p.m., WAC DN | | UMKC | W 75–63 | 12–12 (4–4) | UTRGV Fieldhouse (846); Edinburg, TX |
| February 7, 2019; 8:00 p.m., ESPN3 | | at Grand Canyon | W 72–69 | 13–12 (5–4) | GCU Arena; Phoenix, AZ |
| February 9, 2019; 9:00 p.m., ESPN3 | | at Cal State Bakersfield | W 79–74 | 14–12 (6–4) | Icardo Center; Bakersfield, CA |
| February 14, 2019; 7:00 p.m., WAC DN | | Seattle | W 59–44 | 15–12 (7–4) | UTRGV Fieldhouse; Edinburg, TX |
| February 16, 2019; 7:00 p.m., WAC DN | | Utah Valley | L 64–76 | 15–13 (7–5) | UTRGV Fieldhouse; Edinburg, TX |
| February 19, 2019*; 7:00 p.m., WAC DN | | Wayland Baptist | W 85–66 | 16–13 (7–5) | UTRGV Fieldhouse; Edinburg, TX |
| February 23, 2019; 5:00 p.m., WAC DN | | at New Mexico State | L 79–88 | 16–14 (7–6) | Pan American Center; Las Cruces, NM |
| February 28, 2019; 7:00 p.m., WAC DN | | at Chicago State | W 82–77 | 17–14 (8–6) | Jones Convocation Center; Chicago, IL |
| March 2, 2019; 6:00 p.m., WAC DN | | at UMKC | W 75–70 | 18–14 (9–6) | Swinney Recreation Center; Kansas City, MO |
| March 7, 2019; 7:00 p.m., WAC DN | | California Baptist | L 79–82 | 18–15 (9–7) | UTRGV Fieldhouse (1,162); Edinburg, TX |
WAC tournament
| March 14, 2019; 4:30 p.m., ESPN+ | (4) | vs. (5) Cal State Bakersfield; Quarterfinals | W 85–70 | 19–15 | Orleans Arena; Paradise, NV |
| March 15, 2019; 8:00 p.m., ESPN+ | (4) | vs. (1) New Mexico State; Semifinals | L 72–79 | 19–16 | Orleans Arena; Paradise, NV |
CollegeInsider.com Postseason Tournament
| March 20, 2019*; 7:00 p.m., CBS Sports Live | | Grambling State; First round | W 74–73 | 20–16 | UTRGV Fieldhouse (2,071); Edinburg, TX |
| March 25, 2019*; 7:00 p.m., CBS Sports Live | | Texas Southern; Second round | L 85–94 | 20–17 | UTRGV Fieldhouse (2,216); Edinburg, TX |
*Non-conference game. ^{#}Rankings from AP poll. (#) Tournament seedings in parentheses. All times are in Central.

== See also ==
- 2018–19 Texas–Rio Grande Valley Vaqueros women's basketball team
