= 2018–19 UMKC Kangaroos men's basketball team =

American college basketball season

2018–19 UMKC Kangaroos men's basketball
- Conference: Western Athletic Conference
- Record: 11–21 (6–10 WAC)
- Head coach: Kareem Richardson (6th season)
- Associate head coach: Angres Thorpe (6th season)
- Assistant coaches: Conner Hampton (3rd season); Josh Sash (2nd season)
- Home arena: Swinney Recreation Center, Municipal Auditorium

2018–19 WAC men's basketball standings
	Conf.				Overall
Team	W		L	PCT	W		L	PCT
New Mexico State †	15	–	1	.938	30	–	5	.857
Utah Valley	12	–	4	.750	25	–	10	.714
Grand Canyon	10	–	6	.625	20	–	14	.588
Texas–Rio Grande Valley	9	–	7	.563	20	–	17	.541
California Baptist *	7	–	9	.438	16	–	15	.516
Cal State Bakersfield	7	–	9	.438	18	–	16	.529
Seattle	6	–	10	.375	18	–	15	.545
UMKC	6	–	10	.375	11	–	21	.344
Chicago State	0	–	16	.000	3	–	29	.094
† 2019 WAC tournament winner * Ineligible for WAC tournament (reclassification from NCAA Division II)

The 2018–19 UMKC Kangaroos men's basketball team represented the University of Missouri–Kansas City during the 2018–19 NCAA Division I men's basketball season. The Kangaroos, led by sixth-year head coach Kareem Richardson, played their home conference games on-campus at Swinney Recreation Center and home non-conference games off-campus at Municipal Auditorium in Kansas City, Missouri as a member of the Western Athletic Conference (WAC).

The Kangaroos finished the season 11–21, 6–10 in WAC play to finish in a tie for seventh place. They were defeated by Utah Valley University in the WAC tournament quarterfinal round.

Following the elimination in the conference tournament, Richardson was told he would not lead the program for a seventh season.

== Previous season ==
The Kangaroos finished the 2017–18 season with a record of 10–22 overall, 10–6 in conference to finish in a tie for sixth place.

== Roster ==
2018–19 UMKC Kangaroos men's basketball team
Players
Coaches

Pos.	#	Name	Height	Weight	Year	Previous school	Hometown
F/C	30	Aleer Leek	6 ft 9 in (2.06 m)	225 lb (102 kg)	Sr	Victory Rock Prep/ IMG Academy	Juba, South Sudan
F	4	Danny Dixon	6 ft 10 in (2.08 m)	230 lb (104 kg)	RS Jr	George Mason; Grosse Pointe South HS	Grosse Pointe Park, MI
F	13	Jamel Allen	6 ft 7 in (2.01 m)	210 lb (95 kg)	Jr		Brentwood, NY
G	0	Xavier Bishop	5 ft 8 in (1.73 m)	150 lb (68 kg)	Jr	Lanphier HS	Springfield, IL
F	5	Jordan Giles	6 ft 7 in (2.01 m)	225 lb (102 kg)	Jr	Tennessee Christian Preparatory/ Holy Spirit Catholic	Tuscaloosa, AL
G	2	Rob Whitfield	6 ft 3 in (1.91 m)	175 lb (79 kg)	Jr	Hutchinson CC; Wake Christian Academy	Raleigh, NC
F	22	Brandon Suggs	6 ft 8 in (2.03 m)	220 lb (100 kg)	RS So	Bethune–Cookman; Winnebago HS	Rockford, IL
G	25	Steve Dulley (W)	6 ft 3 in (1.91 m)	200 lb (91 kg)	So	Lincoln College Preparatory	Kansas City, MO
G/F	11	Tony Jackson	6 ft 5 in (1.96 m)	205 lb (93 kg)	So	North Hardin HS	Montgomery, AL
G	3	Brandon McKissic	6 ft 3 in (1.91 m)	195 lb (88 kg)	So	St. Louis University HS	Ferguson, MO
G	33	Marvin Nesbitt, Jr.	6 ft 4 in (1.93 m)	180 lb (82 kg)	So	Butler College Preparatory HS	Chicago, IL
G/F	1	Marco Smith	6 ft 2 in (1.88 m)	165 lb (75 kg)	So	Washington HS	Kansas City, KS
G	12	Kaleb Roy (W)	6 ft 3 in (1.91 m)	180 lb (82 kg)	RS Fr	Shaker Heights HS	Shaker Heights, OH
G	15	Kenny Strawbridge	6 ft 4 in (1.93 m)	190 lb (86 kg)	RS Fr		Rockford, IL
G	10	Will Mangum	6 ft 7 in (2.01 m)	195 lb (88 kg)	Fr		Memphis, TN

Head coach

- Kareem Richardson (Evansville)

Assistant coach(es)

- Angres Thorpe (Saint Leo)
- Conner Hampton (Tabor)
- Josh Sash (William Penn)

Legend

- (C) Team captain
- (S) Suspended
- (I) Ineligible
- (W) Walk-on
- (5Y) Fifth-year Senior
- Injured
- Current redshirt

Roster
Last update: November 3, 2024

== Schedule & Results ==
Date time, TV	Rank^{#}	Opponent^{#}	Result	Record	High points	High rebounds	High assists	Site (attendance) city, state
Non–Conference Regular Season
November 6, 2018*; 8:00 PM, NBCSC		at Loyola Chicago	L 45–76	0–1	15 – McKissic	6 – Allen	4 – Bishop	Joseph J. Gentile Arena (3,795); Chicago, IL
November 8, 2018*; 7:00 PM, BTN+		at Iowa; 2K Classic benefiting Wounded Warrior Project [Regional Round]	L 63–77	0–2	14 – Bishop, McKissic	6 – Leek	4 – Bishop	Carver–Hawkeye Arena (9,317); Iowa City, IA
November 11, 2018*; 4:00 PM, SNY		at UConn; 2K Classic benefiting Wounded Warrior Project [Regional Round]	L 66–94	0–3	15 – Dixon	6 – Dixon	3 – Bishop, McKissic	Harry A. Gampel Pavilion (7,261); Storrs, CT
November 16, 2018*; 4:30 PM		vs. Morehead State; 2K Classic benefiting Wounded Warrior Project [Subregional Semifinal]	L 89–99	0–4	23 – Bishop	7 – Allen	6 – Bishop	Reese Court (166); Cheney, WA
November 16, 2018*; 5:15 PM		at Eastern Washington; 2K Classic benefiting Wounded Warrior Project [Subregional Consolation]	L 80–87 ^{OT}	0–5	28 – Bishop	12 – Dixon	5 – Bishop	Reese Court; Cheney, WA
November 21, 2018*; 6:00 PM, WAC DN		Drake	L 63–66	0–6	27 – Bishop	6 – McKissic	2 – Bishop, Whitfield	Municipal Auditorium (2,186); Kansas City, MO
November 24, 2018*; 2:00 PM, WAC DN		Avila	W 94–58	1–6	18 – Bishop	10 – Dixon	6 – Nesbitt, Jr.	Municipal Auditorium (862); Kansas City, MO
November 28, 2018*; 7:00 PM, ESPN+		at South Dakota State	L 47–75	1–7	11 – Bishop	5 – Giles	4 – Bishop	Frost Arena (1,494); Bookings, SD
December 1, 2018*; 1:00 PM		at Purdue Fort Wayne; The Summit League/WAC; Basketball Challenge	W 90–73	2–7	23 – Whitfield	5 – Bishop	7 – Bishop	Allen County; War Memorial Coliseum (1,389); Fort Wayne, IN
December 8, 2018*; 1:00 PM		at South Dakota	W 65–63	3–7	15 – Bishop	6 – Whitfield	7 – Bishop	Sanford Coyote Sports Center (1,827); Vermillion, SD
December 13, 2018*; 6:00 PM, WAC DN		Milwaukee	L 66–69	3–8	16 – Bishop	5 – Dixon	5 – Bishop	Municipal Auditorium (987); Kansas City, MO
December 15, 2018*; 6:00 PM, WAC DN		McNeese	W 80–67	4–8	19 – Whitfield	5 – Dixon	7 – Bishop	Municipal Auditorium (1,012); Kansas City, MO
December 19, 2018*; 6:00 PM, ESPN+		at Central Michigan	L 72–81	4–9	19 – Bishop	5 – Dixon, Allen	3 – Bishop, McKissic	McGuirk Arena (1,569); Mount Pleasant, MI
December 22, 2018*; 2:00 PM, WAC DN		Elon	W 95–59	5–9	18 – Allen	7 – Nesbitt, Jr.	6 – Bishop	Municipal Auditorium (948); Kansas City, MO
December 27, 2018*; 7:00 PM, FS1		at Creighton	L 53–89	5–10	11 – McKissic	8 – Nesbitt, Jr.	3 – Bishop	CHI Health Center (17,608); Omaha, NE
Conference Regular Season
January 5, 2019; 2:00 PM, WAC DN		Chicago State	W 80–72	6–10 (1–0)	21 – McKissic	6 – Allen	5 – Nesbitt, Jr.	Swinney Recreation Center (894); Kansas City, MO
January 10, 2019; 6:00 PM, WAC DN		California Baptist	W 84–68	7–10 (2–0)	17 – Giles, McKissic	7 – Nesbitt, Jr.	3 – Bishop	Swinney Recreation Center (924); Kansas City, MO
January 17, 2019; 9:00 PM, ESPN3		at CSU Bakersfield	L 73–74	7–11 (2–1)	19 – Bishop	9 – Nesbitt, Jr.	4 – Bishop	Jimmie and Marjorie; Icardo Center (2,133); Bakersfield, CA
January 19, 2019; 8:00 PM, ESPN3		at Grand Canyon	L 50–78	7–12 (2–2)	11 – Bishop	8 – Nesbitt, Jr.	5 – Bishop	GCU Arena (7,215); Phoenix, AZ
January 24, 2019; 6:00 PM, WAC DN		Utah Valley	L 67–75	7–13 (2–3)	22 – Bishop	4 – Dixon	4 – Bishop	Swinney Recreation Center (1,076); Kansas City, MO
January 26, 2019; 6:00 PM, WAC DN		Seattle	W 63–54	8–13 (3–3)	22 – Bishop	7 – Nesbitt, Jr/	3 – McKissic, Whitfield	Swinney Recreation Center (1,372); Kansas City, MO
January 31, 2019; 8:00 PM		at New Mexico State	L 54–70	8–14 (3–4)	16 – Whitfield	4 – Allen	3 – McKissic	Pan American Center (5,029); Las Cruces, NM
February 2, 2019; 7:00 PM, WAC DN		at UT Rio Grande Valley	L 63–75	8–15 (3–5)	13 – McKissic	7 – Dixon	5 – Whitfield	UTRGV Fieldhouse (846); Edinburg, TX
February 9, 2019; 9:00 PM, FSW		at California Baptist	L 60–70	8–16 (3–6)	17 – Whitfield	4 – Giles	3 – McKissic	CBU Events Center (4,813); Riverside, CA
February 14, 2019; 6:00 PM, WAC DN		Grand Canyon	W 87–75 ^{OT}	9–16 (4–6)	19 – Whitfield	5 – Suggs	5 – McKissic	Swinney Recreation Center (1,026); Kansas City, MO
February 16, 2019; 6:00 PM, WAC DN		CSU Bakersfield	W 75–67	10–16 (5–6)	14 – Bishop, Giles	7 – Nesbitt, Jr.	5 – Bishop	Swinney Recreation Center (1,461); Kansas City, MO
February 21, 2019; 9:00 PM, WAC DN		at Seattle	L 64–69	10–17 (5–7)	14 – Bishop	13 – Suggs	1 – Dixon, Bishop, Giles, Whitfield, Suggs, McKissic, Nesbitt, Jr.	Redhawk Center (999); Seattle, WA
February 23, 2019; 8:00 PM, WAC DN		at Utah Valley	L 67–69	10–18 (5–8)	19 – Bishop	5 – Suggs, Nesbitt, Jr.	6 – Bishop	UCCU Center (2,805); Orem, UT
February 28, 2019; 6:00 PM, ESPN+		New Mexico State	L 55–75	10–19 (5–9)	15 – Bishop	4 – Giles	2 – Bishop, McKissic, Nesbitt, Jr.	Swinney Recreation Center (1,194); Kansas City, MO
March 2, 2019; 6:00 PM, WAC DN		UT Rio Grande Valley	L 70–75	10–20 (5–10)	20 – McKissic	5 – Dixon	7 – Bishop	Swinney Recreation Center (1,537); Kansas City, MO
March 9, 2019; 2:00 PM, WAC DN		at Chicago State	W 76–61	11–20 (6–10)	17 – Giles	9 – Giles	6 – Bishop	Emil and Patricia; Jones Convocation Center (534); Chicago, IL
Conference Tournament
March 14, 2019*; 8:00 PM, ESPN+	(7)	vs. (2) Utah Valley [Quarterfinal]	L 64–71	11–21	17 – Bishop	5 – Allen, Giles	4 – Bishop	Orleans Arena (1,837); Paradise, NV
*Non-conference game. ^{#}Rankings from AP Poll. (#) Tournament seedings in parentheses. All times are in Central Standard Time (CST).
