= 2019 College Basketball Invitational =

College basketball tournament

- Teams: 16
- Finals site: Yuengling Center; McGrath–Phillips Arena, Tampa, Florida; Chicago, Illinois
- Champions: South Florida Bulls (1st title)
- Runner-up: DePaul Blue Demons (1st title game)
- Semifinalists: Loyola Marymount Lions (1st semifinal); Coastal Carolina Chanticleers (2nd semifinal)
- Winning coach: Brian Gregory (1st title)
- MVP: David Collins (South Florida)
- Attendance: 32,449

The 2019 College Basketball Invitational (CBI) was a single-elimination men's college basketball tournament consisting of 16 National Collegiate Athletic Association (NCAA) Division I teams that did not participate in the 2019 NCAA Men's Division I Basketball Tournament or the NIT. It was held from March 19 through April 5, 2019 in various arenas. This event marked the 12th year the tournament has been held.

== Participating teams ==
The following teams were announced as participants Sunday, March 17 after the NCAA Selection Show.

Team	Conference	Overall record	Conference record
Brown	Ivy	19–11	7–7
Cal State Northridge	Big West	13–20	7–9
California Baptist	WAC	16–14	7–9
Central Michigan	MAC	23–11	10–8
Coastal Carolina	Sun Belt	15–16	9–9
DePaul	Big East	15–15	7–11
Loyola Marymount	West Coast	20–11	8–8
Longwood	Big South	15–17	5–11
Grand Canyon	WAC	20–13	10–6
Howard	MEAC	17–16	10–6
South Florida	American	19–13	8–10
Southern Miss	Conference USA	20–12	11–7
Stony Brook	America East	24–8	12–4
UAB	Conference USA	20–14	10–8
Utah Valley	WAC	24–9	12–4
West Virginia	Big 12	14–20	4–14

=== Declined invitations ===
The following programs declined an invitation to play in the CBI.

- Bowling Green
- BYU
- Fresno State
- Jacksonville State
- Omaha
- San Francisco
- UTSA

== Format ==
The 2019 CBI had 16 teams organized into four regional brackets of four teams. The four teams that advanced to the semifinals were reseeded. The finals were a best-of-three series.

== Schedule ==
Date	Time*	Matchup	Television	Score	Attendance
First round
March 19	9:00 pm	Cal State Northridge at **Utah Valley**	WAC DN	84–92	375
March 20	7:00 pm	Grand Canyon at **West Virginia**	Frontier	63–77	5,313
March 20	7:00 pm	Howard at **Coastal Carolina**	ESPN+	72–81	779
March 20	7:00 pm	Stony Brook at **South Florida**	Bullvision	79–82^{OT}	1,705
March 20	7:00 pm	Southern Miss at **Longwood**	ESPN+	68–90	1,372
March 20	7:00 pm	UAB at **Brown**	ESPN+	78–83	683
March 20	8:00 pm	Central Michigan at **DePaul**		86–100	1,173
March 20	10:00 pm	**Loyola Marymount** at California Baptist	WAC DN	56–55	2,346
Quarterfinals
March 25	7:00 pm	**Coastal Carolina** at West Virginia		109–91	6,775
March 25	7:00 pm	Utah Valley at **South Florida**	Bullvision	57–66	1,679
March 25	8:00 pm	Longwood at **DePaul**	NBCSN Chicago+	89–97	1,040
March 25	10:00 pm	Brown at **Loyola Marymount**	TheW.tv	63–81	657
Semifinals
March 27	8:00 pm	Coastal Carolina at **DePaul**		87–92	939
March 28	7:00 pm	Loyola Marymount at **South Florida**		47–56	1,658
Finals
April 1	7:00 pm	DePaul at **South Florida**	ESPNU	61–63	2,375
April 3	8:00 pm	South Florida at **DePaul**	ESPNU	96–100^{OT}	1,704
April 5	7:00 pm	**South Florida** at DePaul	ESPNU	77–65	1,876
*All times are listed as Eastern Daylight Time (UTC-4). Winning team in **bold**.

== Bracket ==
First round March 19–20
DePaul	100
Central Michigan	86
Longwood	90
Southern Miss	68
West Virginia	77
Grand Canyon	63
Coastal Carolina	81
Howard	72
South Florida	82*
Stony Brook	79
Utah Valley	92
Cal State Northridge	84
California Baptist	55
Loyola Marymount	56
Brown	83
UAB	78

Quarterfinals; March 25
DePaul	97
Longwood	89
West Virginia	91
Coastal Carolina	109
South Florida	66
Utah Valley	57
Loyola Marymount	81
Brown	63

Semifinals (Reseeded); March 27–28
DePaul	92
Coastal Carolina	87
South Florida	56
Loyola Marymount	47

Finals (Best of three); April 1, 3, 5
DePaul	61	100*	65
South Florida	63	96	77

Home teams listed first.
* Denotes overtime period.
