= 2018–19 Seattle Redhawks men's basketball team =

American college basketball season

2018–19 Seattle Redhawks men's basketball

CIT, First round
- Conference: Western Athletic Conference
- Record: 18–15 (6–10 WAC)
- Head coach: Jim Hayford (2nd season)
- Assistant coaches: Chris Victor; Nick Robinson; Sam Kirby
- Home arena: Redhawk Center; ShoWare Center

2018–19 WAC men's basketball standings
	Conf.				Overall
Team	W		L	PCT	W		L	PCT
New Mexico State †	15	–	1	.938	30	–	5	.857
Utah Valley	12	–	4	.750	25	–	10	.714
Grand Canyon	10	–	6	.625	20	–	14	.588
Texas–Rio Grande Valley	9	–	7	.563	20	–	17	.541
California Baptist *	7	–	9	.438	16	–	15	.516
Cal State Bakersfield	7	–	9	.438	18	–	16	.529
Seattle	6	–	10	.375	18	–	15	.545
UMKC	6	–	10	.375	11	–	21	.344
Chicago State	0	–	16	.000	3	–	29	.094
† 2019 WAC tournament winner * Ineligible for WAC tournament (reclassification from NCAA Division II)

The 2018–19 Seattle Redhawks men's basketball team represented Seattle University during the 2018–19 NCAA Division I men's basketball season. The Redhawks, led by second-year head coach Jim Hayford, played their home games at the Redhawk Center, with two home games at the ShoWare Center, as members of the Western Athletic Conference. They finished the season 18–15, 6–10 in WAC play to finish in a tie for seventh place. They were defeated by Grand Canyon in the quarterfinals of the WAC tournament. They received an invitation to the CollegeInsider.com Tournament, where they lost in the first round to Presbyterian.

== Previous season ==
The Redhawks finished the 2017–18 season 20–14, 8–6 in WAC play to finish in fourth place. It was the Redhawks' first 20-win season since 2008 and first 20-win season in Division I play since the 1960s.

In the postseason, they defeated Texas–Rio Grande Valley to advance to the semifinals of the WAC tournament where they lost to New Mexico State. They received an invitation to the College Basketball Invitational where they lost in the first round to Central Arkansas.

== Roster ==
2018–19 Seattle Redhawks men's basketball team
Players
Coaches

Pos.	#	Name	Height	Weight	Year	Hometown
G	0	Dashawn McDowell	6 ft 5 in (1.96 m)	185 lb (84 kg)	RS So	Oklahoma City, Oklahoma
F	1	Myles Carter	6 ft 9 in (2.06 m)	230 lb (104 kg)	RS Jr	Chicago, Illinois
G	2	Ian Burke	6 ft 5 in (1.96 m)	180 lb (82 kg)	Fr	Phoenix, Arizona
G	5	Matej Kavas	6 ft 8 in (2.03 m)	200 lb (91 kg)	RS So	Ljubljana, Slovenia
G	10	Aaron Nettles	5 ft 11 in (1.8 m)	175 lb (79 kg)	RS So	Seattle, Washington
G	11	Rip Economou	6 ft 8 in (2.03 m)	180 lb (82 kg)	Fr	Santa Monica, California
G	12	Mattia Da Campo	6 ft 5 in (1.96 m)	210 lb (95 kg)	Jr	Venice, Italy
G	13	Morgan Means	6 ft 3 in (1.91 m)	175 lb (79 kg)	RS Jr	Compton, California
F	14	Matt Vail	6 ft 5 in (1.96 m)	190 lb (86 kg)	Fr	Stanwood, Washington
G	15	Trey Hopkins	6 ft 4 in (1.93 m)	163 lb (74 kg)	Fr	Midwest City, Oklahoma
G	23	Terrell Brown Jr.	6 ft 1 in (1.85 m)	175 lb (79 kg)	RS So	Seattle, Washington
G	24	Delante Jones	6 ft 5 in (1.96 m)	195 lb (88 kg)	RS Jr	Chantilly, Virginia
F	25	Anand Hundal	6 ft 10 in (2.08 m)	230 lb (104 kg)	Jr	Manteca, California
F	30	Jacob Eyman	6 ft 9 in (2.06 m)	205 lb (93 kg)	Fr	Los Alamitos, California
G/F	35	Riley Grigsby	6 ft 6 in (1.98 m)	220 lb (100 kg)	Fr	San Jose, California
F	41	Joe Wall	6 ft 7 in (2.01 m)	215 lb (98 kg)	Fr	Portland, Oregon

Head coach

- Jim Hayford (Azusa Pacific)

Assistant coach(es)

- Chris Victor (Concordia–Irvine)
- Nick Robinson (Stanford)
- Sam Kirby (West Georgia)

Legend

- (C) Team captain
- (S) Suspended
- (I) Ineligible
- (W) Walk-on
- Injured
- Current redshirt

Roster
Last update: November 8, 2018

== Schedule and results ==
Date time, TV	Rank^{#}	Opponent^{#}	Result	Record	Site (attendance) city, state
Non-conference regular season
Nov 6, 2018*; 7:00 pm, P12N		at Stanford	L 74–96	0–1	Maples Pavilion (3,365); Stanford, CA
Nov 8, 2018*; 7:00 pm		Puget Sound	W 95–67	1–1	Redhawk Center (999); Seattle, WA
Nov 11, 2018*; 7:00 pm		Bryant	W 82–59	2–1	ShoWare Center (1,236); Kent, WA
Nov 14, 2018*; 7:00 pm		Washington State	W 78–69	3–1	ShoWare Center (1,977); Kent, WA
Nov 18, 2018*; 1:00 pm		Southern Utah	L 70–73	3–2	Redhawk Center (999); Seattle, WA
Nov 23, 2018*; 12:00 pm		Denver; Elgin Baylor Classic	W 82–63	4–2	Redhawk Center (883); Seattle, WA
Nov 24, 2018*; 3:00 pm		Fairfield; Elgin Baylor Classic	W 83–80	5–2	Redhawk Center (809); Seattle, WA
Nov 25, 2018*; 3:00 pm		Longwood; Elgin Baylor Classic	W 70–50	6–2	Redhawk Center (753); Seattle, WA
Nov 28, 2018*; 7:00 pm		Northwest; Elgin Baylor Classic	W 107–72	7–2	Redhawk Center (883); Seattle, WA
Dec 1, 2018*; 5:00 pm		Eastern Washington	W 88–68	8–2	Redhawk Center (999); Seattle, WA
Dec 6, 2018*; 7:00 pm		Omaha; Summit League/WAC Challenge	W 90–72	9–2	Redhawk Center (873); Seattle, WA
Dec 9, 2018*; 6:00 pm, P12N		at Washington	L 62–70	9–3	Hec Edmundson Pavilion (6,688); Seattle, WA
Dec 17, 2018*; 6:00 pm		at Portland	W 67–56	10–3	Chiles Center (1,553); Portland, OR
Dec 20, 2018*; 7:00 pm		Prairie View A&M	W 102–64	11–3	Redhawk Center (965); Seattle, WA
Dec 29, 2018*; 5:00 pm, P12N		at California	W 82–73	12–3	Haas Pavilion (4,104); Berkeley, CA
WAC regular season
Jan 3, 2019; 7:00 pm, ESPN3		at Cal State Bakersfield	L 71–83	12–4 (0–1)	Icardo Center (2,398); Bakersfield, CA
Jan 5, 2019; 6:00 pm, ESPN3		at Grand Canyon	L 57–71	12–5 (0–2)	GCU Arena (7,293); Phoenix, AZ
Jan 12, 2019; 6:00 pm		at Utah Valley	L 78–88	12–6 (0–3)	UCCU Center (3,258); Orem, UT
Jan 17, 2019; 7:00 pm		New Mexico State	L 60–87	12–7 (0–4)	Redhawk Center (999); Seattle, WA
Jan 19, 2019; 7:00 pm		Texas–Rio Grande Valley	L 62–67	12–8 (0–5)	Redhawk Center (999); Seattle, WA
Jan 24, 2019; 5:00 pm		at Chicago State	W 75–47	13–8 (1–5)	Jones Convocation Center; Chicago, IL
Jan 26, 2019; 4:00 pm		at UMKC	L 54–63	13–9 (1–6)	Swinney Recreation Center (1,220); Kansas City, MO
Feb 2, 2019; 7:00 pm		California Baptist	L 64–75	13–10 (1–7)	Redhawk Center (999); Seattle, WA
Feb 9, 2019; 1:00 pm		Utah Valley	Postponed (weather)		Redhawk Center; Seattle, WA
Feb 14, 2019; 4:00 pm		at Texas–Rio Grande Valley	L 44–59	13–11 (1–8)	UTRGV Fieldhouse (1,103); Edinburg, TX
Feb 16, 2019; 6:00 pm		at New Mexico State	L 53–59	13–12 (1–9)	Pan American Center (11,889); Las Cruces, NM
Feb 21, 2019; 7:00 pm		UMKC	W 69–64	14–12 (2–9)	Redhawk Center (999); Seattle, WA
Feb 23, 2019; 1:00 pm		Chicago State	W 77–57	15–12 (3–9)	Redhawk Center (999); Seattle, WA
Feb 26, 2019; 7:00 pm		Utah Valley	L 68–77	15–13 (3–10)	Redhawk Center; Seattle, WA
Feb 28, 2019; 7:00 pm		at California Baptist	W 67–65	16–13 (4–10)	CBU Events Center; Riverside, CA
Mar 7, 2019; 7:00 pm		Cal State Bakersfield	W 63–57	17–13 (5–10)	Redhawk Center (969); Seattle, WA
Mar 9, 2019; 1:00 pm		Grand Canyon	W 83–76	18–13 (6–10)	Redhawk Center (999); Seattle, WA
WAC tournament
Mar 14, 2019; 8:30 pm	(6)	vs. (3) Grand Canyon; Quarterfinals	L 75–84	18–14	Orleans Arena (2,374); Paradise, NV
CollegeInsider.com Postseason tournament
Mar 20, 2019*; 7:00 pm, CBS Sports Live		Presbyterian; First round	L 68–72	18–15	Redhawk Center (472); Seattle, WA
*Non-conference game. ^{#}Rankings from AP Poll. (#) Tournament seedings in parentheses. All times are in Pacific Time Source:.
