= 2018–19 Cal State Bakersfield Roadrunners men's basketball team =

American college basketball season

2018–19 Cal State Bakersfield Roadrunners men's basketball
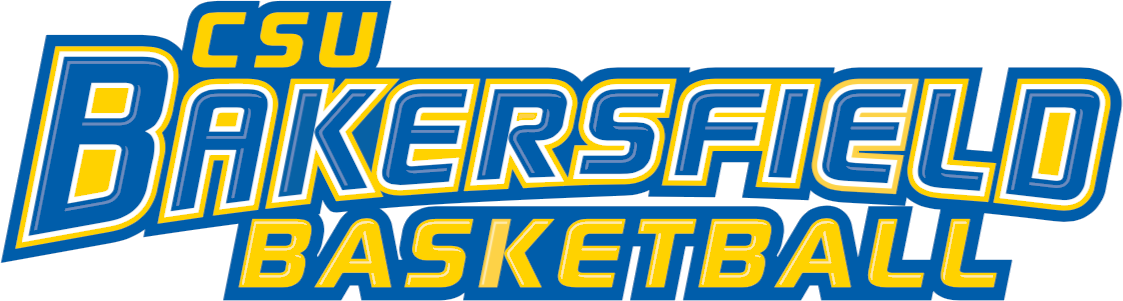

Riley Wallace Classic champions

CIT, Quarterfinals
- Conference: Western Athletic Conference
- Record: 18–16 (7–9 WAC)
- Head coach: Rod Barnes (8th season)
- Assistant coaches: Jeff Conarroe; Benjy Taylor; Mike Scott
- Home arena: Icardo Center (Capacity: 3,497)

2018–19 WAC men's basketball standings
| | Conf. | | | | Overall |
| Team | W | | L | PCT | W | | L | PCT |
|---|---|---|---|---|---|---|---|---|
| New Mexico State † | 15 | – | 1 | .938 | 30 | – | 5 | .857 |
| Utah Valley | 12 | – | 4 | .750 | 25 | – | 10 | .714 |
| Grand Canyon | 10 | – | 6 | .625 | 20 | – | 14 | .588 |
| Texas–Rio Grande Valley | 9 | – | 7 | .563 | 20 | – | 17 | .541 |
| California Baptist * | 7 | – | 9 | .438 | 16 | – | 15 | .516 |
| Cal State Bakersfield | 7 | – | 9 | .438 | 18 | – | 16 | .529 |
| Seattle | 6 | – | 10 | .375 | 18 | – | 15 | .545 |
| UMKC | 6 | – | 10 | .375 | 11 | – | 21 | .344 |
| Chicago State | 0 | – | 16 | .000 | 3 | – | 29 | .094 |
† 2019 WAC tournament winner * Ineligible for WAC tournament (reclassification from NCAA Division II)

The 2018–19 Cal State Bakersfield Roadrunners men's basketball team represented California State University, Bakersfield in the 2018–19 NCAA Division I men's basketball season. The Roadrunners were led by eighth-year head coach Rod Barnes and competed at the Icardo Center. CSU Bakersfield was a member of the Western Athletic Conference. They finished the season 18–16, 7–9 in WAC play to finish in a tie for fifth place. They lost in the quarterfinals of the WAC tournament to Texas–Rio Grande Valley. They were invited to the CollegeInsider.com Tournament where they defeated Cal State Fullerton in the first round to win the Riley Wallace Classic and defeated Southern Utah in the second round before losing in the quarterfinals to Green Bay.

== Before the season ==
The Roadrunners finished 12–18 overall, and 5–9 in the conference. During the season, the Roadrunners participated in the Great Alaska Shootout, which was held in Anchorage, Alaska. The Roadrunners finished as a runner–up from defeating Alaska Anchorage and Idaho but losing to Central Michigan. In the postseason, CSU Bakersfield lost to Utah Valley in the quarterfinals of the 2018 WAC men's basketball tournament in Paradise, Nevada.

== Roster ==
2018–19 Cal State Bakersfield Roadrunners men's basketball team
Players
Coaches

| Pos. | # | Name | Height | Weight | Year | Previous school | Hometown |
|---|---|---|---|---|---|---|---|
| G | 0 | Jarkel Joiner | 6 ft 1 in (1.85 m) | 170 lb (77 kg) | So | Oxford High School | Oxford, Mississippi |
| F | 1 | Darius Williams | 6 ft 9 in (2.06 m) | 200 lb (91 kg) | Jr | Paris Junior College | Newark, New Jersey |
| G | 2 | Rickey Holden | 5 ft 10 in (1.78 m) | 180 lb (82 kg) | Sr | Jones County Junior College | Laurel, Mississippi |
| F | 3 | Tazé Moore | 6 ft 5 in (1.96 m) | 180 lb (82 kg) | RS So | Southaven High School | Southaven, Mississippi |
| F | 4 | James Suber | 6 ft 7 in (2.01 m) | 220 lb (100 kg) | RS Sr | Panola College | Philadelphia, Pennsylvania |
| G | 5 | Jeremiah Dickerson | 5 ft 10 in (1.78 m) | 155 lb (70 kg) | RS Fr | Bakersfield High School | Bakersfield, California |
| G/F | 10 | Justin Edler | 6 ft 4 in (1.93 m) | 215 lb (98 kg) | RS So | Morse High School | San Diego, California |
| G | 11 | Kevin McNeal | 6 ft 5 in (1.96 m) | 175 lb (79 kg) | Jr | San Bernardino Valley College | San Bernardino, California |
| G | 13 | De'Monte Buckingham | 6 ft 4 in (1.93 m) | 220 lb (100 kg) | Jr | Richmond | Richmond, Virginia |
| F | 21 | Greg Lee | 6 ft 9 in (2.06 m) | 210 lb (95 kg) | RS So | Westside High School | Rockford, Illinois |
| G/F | 22 | Justin McCall | 6 ft 6 in (1.98 m) | 210 lb (95 kg) | So | Ridgeview High School | Bakersfield, California |
| G | 23 | Damiyne Durham | 6 ft 4 in (1.93 m) | 180 lb (82 kg) | RS Sr | Oakwood High School | Oakwood, Texas |
| F | 24 | Bray Barnes | 6 ft 5 in (1.96 m) | 195 lb (88 kg) | RS Sr | Liberty High School | Bakersfield, California |
| F | 25 | Darrin Person | 6 ft 7 in (2.01 m) | 225 lb (102 kg) | RS Fr | Immanuel High School | Fresno, California |
| F | 35 | Cartrell Johnson | 6 ft 8 in (2.03 m) | 200 lb (91 kg) | RS Fr | Price High School | Compton, California |

Head coach

- Rod Barnes (Ole Miss)

Assistant coach(es)

- Jeff Conarroe (Colorado College)
- Benjy Taylor (Richmond)
- Mike Scott (Fairleigh Dickinson)

Legend

- (C) Team captain
- (S) Suspended
- (I) Ineligible
- (W) Walk-on
- Injured
- Current redshirt

Roster
Last update: 29 September 2018

== Schedule ==
| Date time, TV | Rank^{#} | Opponent^{#} | Result | Record | High points | High rebounds | High assists | Site (attendance) city, state |
Regular season
| November 7, 2018*; 6:00 pm, FSSW | | at No. 20 TCU | L 61–66 | 0–1 | 18 – Joiner | 4 – Tied | 5 – Tied | Schollmaier Arena (6,819); Fort Worth, TX |
| November 9, 2018*; 11:00 am, ESPN3 | | Antelope Valley | W 111–75 | 1–1 | 25 – Holden | 8 – Edler-Davis | 6 – Joiner | Icardo Center (3,633); Bakersfield, CA |
| November 15, 2018*; 3:00 pm | | vs. Central Michigan; Junkanoo Jam | L 55–67 | 1–2 | 16 – Durham | 9 – Lee | 3 – Holden | Gateway Christian Academy (325); Bimini, Bahamas |
| November 17, 2018*; 6:00 pm | | vs. San Jose State; Junkanoo Jam | W 73–72 | 2–2 | 22 – Joiner | 5 – Tied | 8 – Holden | Gateway Christian Academy (325); Bimini, Bahamas |
| November 18, 2018*; 8:30 pm | | vs. Weber State; Junkanoo Jam | W 68–67 | 3–2 | 17 – Lee | 8 – Joiner | 3 – Tied | Gateway Christian Academy (521); Bimini, Bahamas |
| November 25, 2018*; 4:00 pm, P12N | | at USC | L 75–90 | 3–3 | 22 – Durham | 9 – Suber | 4 – Tied | Galen Center (2,348); Los Angeles, CA |
| December 1, 2018*; 2:30 pm, ESPN3 | | at South Dakota | L 56–68 | 3–4 | 14 – Tied | 11 – Suber | 5 – Holden | Sanford Center (2,063); Vermillion, SD |
| December 4, 2018*; 7:00 pm, ESPN3 | | UC Merced | W 67–53 | 4–4 | 22 – Joiner | 19 – Suber | 6 – Tied | Icardo Center (1,907); Bakersfield, CA |
| December 8, 2018*; 7:00 pm | | at Idaho | W 73–67 | 5–4 | 20 – Suber | 13 – Suber | 4 – Holden | Cowan Spectrum (539); Moscow, ID |
| December 13, 2018*; 7:00 pm, ESPN3 | | Lamar | W 86–65 | 6–4 | 20 – Holden | 8 – Suber | 9 – Holden | Icardo Center (1,794); Bakersfield, CA |
| December 18, 2018*; 7:00 pm, ESPN3 | | Cal Poly | W 74–61 | 7–4 | 15 – Edler-Davis | 11 – Joiner | 7 – Moore | Icardo Center (1,987); Bakersfield, CA |
| December 20, 2018*; 7:00 pm | | at Portland State | W 76–71 | 8–4 | 24 – Joiner | 9 – Suber | 3 – Holden | Viking Pavilion (646); Portland, OR |
| December 31, 2018*; 6:00 pm, RTNW | | at No. 7 Gonzaga | L 54–89 | 8–5 | 24 – Joiner | 7 – Suber | 2 – Joiner | McCarthey Center (6,000); Spokane, WA |
| January 3, 2019; 7:00 pm, ESPN3 | | Seattle | W 83–71 | 9–5 (1–0) | 20 – Durham | 6 – Elder-Davis | 7 – Holden | Icardo Center (2,398); Bakersfield, CA |
| January 5, 2019; 7:00 pm, ESPN3 | | Utah Valley | W 73–71 | 10–5 (2–0) | 16 – Tied | 8 – Elder-Davis | 8 – Holden | Icardo Center (2,677); Bakersfield, CA |
| January 10, 2019; 5:00 pm | | at Texas–Rio Grande Valley | W 75–69 | 11–5 (3–0) | 19 – Elder-Davis | 11 – Suber | 6 – Durham | UTRGV Fieldhouse (802); Edinburg, TX |
| January 12, 2019; 3:00 pm | | at New Mexico State | L 62–73 | 11–6 (3–1) | 19 – Holden | 6 – Tied | 3 – Holden | Pan American Center (4,702); Las Cruces, NM |
| January 17, 2019; 7:00 pm, ESPN3 | | UMKC | W 74–73 | 12–6 (4–1) | 16 – Edler | 8 – Edler | 5 – Holden | Icardo Center (2,133); Bakersfield, CA |
| January 19, 2019; 7:00 pm, ESPN3 | | Chicago State | W 86–73 | 13–6 (5–1) | 22 – Joiner | 7 – Edler | 3 – Holden | Icardo Center (2,544); Bakersfield, CA |
| January 24, 2019; 7:00 pm | | at California Baptist | W 88–84 | 14–6 (6–1) | 34 – Joiner | 11 – Suber | 9 – Holden | CBU Events Center (3,005); Riverside, CA |
| January 29, 2019*; 7:00 pm, ESPN3 | | UC Santa Cruz | W 81–54 | 15–6 | 12 – Durham | 6 – Suber | 4 – Dickerson | Icardo Center (3,211); Bakersfield, CA |
| February 2, 2019; 7:00 pm, ESPN3 | | Grand Canyon | L 59–72 | 15–7 (6–2) | 27 – Joiner | 8 – Suber | 2 – Joiner | Icardo Center (3,515); Bakersfield, CA |
| February 7, 2019; 7:00 pm, ESPN3 | | New Mexico State | L 70–71 ^{OT} | 15–8 (6–3) | 25 – Joiner | 7 – Joiner | 2 – Edler | Icardo Center (2,789); Bakersfield, CA |
| February 9, 2019; 7:00 pm, ESPN3 | | Texas–Rio Grande Valley | L 74–79 ^{OT} | 15–9 (6–4) | 20 – Joiner | 10 – Edler | 4 – Holden | Icardo Center (2,790); Bakersfield, CA |
| February 14, 2019; 5:00 pm | | at Chicago State | W 75–62 | 16–9 (7–4) | 16 – Joiner | 13 – Suber | 4 – Holden | Convocation Center (355); Chicago, IL |
| February 16, 2019; 4:00 pm | | at UMKC | L 67–75 | 16–10 (7–5) | 19 – Joiner | 11 – Suber | 5 – Holden | Swinney Recreation Center (1,461); Kansas City, MO |
| February 23, 2019; 7:00 pm, ESPN3 | | California Baptist | L 58–72 | 16–11 (7–6) | 22 – Joiner | 11 – Suber | 3 – Moore | Icardo Center (3,211); Bakersfield, CA |
| March 2, 2019; 6:00 pm, ESPN3 | | at Grand Canyon | L 69–73 | 16–12 (7–7) | 29 – Joiner | 10 – Suber | 3 – Edler | GCU Arena (7,497); Phoenix, AZ |
| March 7, 2019; 7:00 pm | | at Seattle | L 57–63 ^{OT} | 16–13 (7–8) | 12 – Joiner | 13 – Suber | 4 – Holden | KeyArena (969); Seattle, WA |
| March 9, 2019; 6:00 pm | | at Utah Valley | L 61–76 | 16–14 (7–9) | 15 – Holden | 4 – Moore | 2 – Holden | UCCU Center (4,167); Orem, UT |
WAC tournament
| March 14, 2019; 2:30 pm, ESPN+ | (5) | vs. (4) Texas–Rio Grande Valley; Quarterfinals | L 70–85 | 16–15 | 16 – Joiner | 9 – Moore | 2 – Holden | Orleans Arena (2,374); Paradise, NV |
CollegeInsider.com Postseason tournament
| March 21, 2019*; 7:00 pm, watchcit.com | | at Cal State Fullerton; First round – Riley Wallace Classic | W 66–58 | 17–15 | 17 – Tied | 12 – Suber | 3 – Holden | Titan Gym (677); Fullerton, CA |
| March 25, 2019*; 5:30, watchcit.com | | at Southern Utah; Second round | W 70–67 | 18–15 | 15 – Lee | 8 – Suber | 3 – Holden | America First Events Center (3,027); Cedar City, UT |
| March 29, 2019*; 4:00 pm, watchcit.com | | at Green Bay; Quarterfinals | L 65–80 | 18–16 | 18 – Tied | 11 – Suber | 2 – Tied | Kress Events Center (1,822); Green Bay, WI |
*Non-conference game. ^{#}Rankings from AP Poll. (#) Tournament seedings in parentheses. All times are in Pacific.
