= 2018–19 Chicago State Cougars men's basketball team =

American college basketball season

2018–19 Chicago State Cougars men's basketball
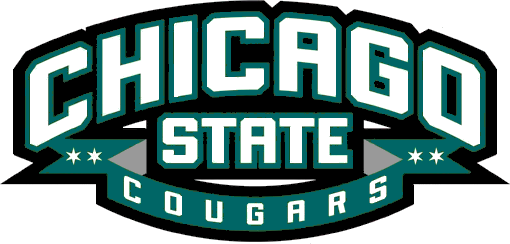
- Conference: Western Athletic Conference
- Record: 3–29 (0–16 WAC)
- Head coach: Lance Irvin (1st season)
- Assistant coaches: Rodell Davis; Brett Putz
- Home arena: Jones Convocation Center

2018–19 WAC men's basketball standings
	Conf.				Overall
Team	W		L	PCT	W		L	PCT
New Mexico State †	15	–	1	.938	30	–	5	.857
Utah Valley	12	–	4	.750	25	–	10	.714
Grand Canyon	10	–	6	.625	20	–	14	.588
Texas–Rio Grande Valley	9	–	7	.563	20	–	17	.541
California Baptist *	7	–	9	.438	16	–	15	.516
Cal State Bakersfield	7	–	9	.438	18	–	16	.529
Seattle	6	–	10	.375	18	–	15	.545
UMKC	6	–	10	.375	11	–	21	.344
Chicago State	0	–	16	.000	3	–	29	.094
† 2019 WAC tournament winner * Ineligible for WAC tournament (reclassification from NCAA Division II)

The 2018–19 Chicago State Cougars men's basketball team were led by first-year head coach Lance Irvin. Their home games were held on campus at the Emil and Patricia Jones Convocation Center. The Cougars are members of the Western Athletic Conference. They finished the season 3–29, 0–16 in WAC play to finish in last place. They lost in the quarterfinals of the WAC tournament to New Mexico State.

== Previous season ==
The Cougars finished the 2017–18 season 3–29, 1–13 in WAC play to finish in last place. They lost in the quarterfinals of the WAC tournament to New Mexico State.

The Cougars had the worst average point margin in Division I at –22.7 points, despite winning two games by over 40 points.

After the season, Chicago State fired head coach Tracy Dildy during the week of March 5, 2018, although it was not officially announced until a week later. After a nearly a five-month search, Lance Irvin, a Chicago native and former assistant coach at DePaul and several other schools, was named the new head coach of the Cougars on August 7.

== Roster ==
2018–19 Chicago State Cougars men's basketball team
Players
Coaches

Pos.	#	Name	Height	Weight	Year	Hometown
F	0	Ken Odiase	6 ft 7 in (2.01 m)	205 lb (93 kg)	RS Sr	Glenwood, Illinois
G	1	Rob Shaw	6 ft 0 in (1.83 m)	180 lb (82 kg)	Sr	Louisville, Kentucky
G	2	Delshon Strickland	6 ft 4 in (1.93 m)	185 lb (84 kg)	RS Sr	Minneapolis, Minnesota
G	3	Travon Bell	6 ft 3 in (1.91 m)	180 lb (82 kg)	So	Chicago, Illinois
G	4	Miles Oliver	6 ft 2 in (1.88 m)	180 lb (82 kg)	Fr	San Bernardino, California
G	5	Jordan Reed	6 ft 0 in (1.83 m)	160 lb (73 kg)	RS So	Bolingbrook, Illinois
G	10	Anthony Harris	6 ft 5 in (1.96 m)	203 lb (92 kg)	Sr	Gary, Indiana
G	11	Delundre Dixon	6 ft 4 in (1.93 m)	220 lb (100 kg)	RS Jr	Rockford, Illinois
F	13	Christian Jacob	6 ft 8 in (2.03 m)	230 lb (104 kg)	Jr	Gary, Indiana
C	15	Noah Bigirumwami	6 ft 10 in (2.08 m)	210 lb (95 kg)	So	Santa Clara, California
F	21	Cameron Bowles	6 ft 7 in (2.01 m)	195 lb (88 kg)	So	Chicago, Illinois
G	22	Michael Johnson	6 ft 1 in (1.85 m)	180 lb (82 kg)	RS So	Chicago, Illinois
F/C	23	Patrick Szpir	6 ft 9 in (2.06 m)	230 lb (104 kg)	Jr	Wheeling, Illinois
F	32	Eugene Witherspoon	6 ft 6 in (1.98 m)	200 lb (91 kg)	Jr	Chicago, IL

Head coach

- Lance Irvin (Idaho)

Assistant coach(es)

- Rodell Davis (Iowa)
- Brett Putz (St. Cloud State)

Legend

- (C) Team captain
- (S) Suspended
- (I) Ineligible
- (W) Walk-on
- Injured
- Current redshirt

Roster
Last update: November 14, 2018

== Schedule and results ==
Date time, TV	Rank^{#}	Opponent^{#}	Result	Record	Site (attendance) city, state
Non-conference regular season
Nov 6, 2018*; 5:30 pm, BTN		at Indiana	L 55–104	0–1	Simon Skjodt Assembly Hall (17,222); Bloomington, IN
Nov 8, 2018*; 6:00 pm, ACCN Extra		at Notre Dame	L 62–89	0–2	Edmund P. Joyce Center (6,684); South Bend, IN
Nov 9, 2018*; 6:00 pm, ESPN3		at Central Michigan	L 60–101	0–3	McGuirk Arena (2,110); Mount Pleasant, MI
Nov 13, 2018*; 7:00 pm, ESPN3		at Illinois State; Cayman Islands Classic campus game	L 71–75	0–4	Redbird Arena (4,320); Normal, IL
Nov 16, 2018*; 6:00 pm, ESPN3		at Akron; Cayman Islands Classic campus game	L 46–87	0–5	James A. Rhodes Arena (2,285); Akron, OH
Nov 19, 2018*; 7:00 pm, ESPN+		at East Tennessee State; Cayman Islands Classic regional semifinals	L 61–86	0–6	Freedom Hall Civic Center (3,325); Johnson City, TN
Nov 20, 2018*; 3:00 pm		vs. Jackson State; Cayman Islands Classic regional	L 68–81	0–7	Freedom Hall Civic Center (329); Johnson City, TN
Nov 24, 2018*; 1:00 pm, ESPN3		at Bradley	L 70–86	0–8	Carver Arena (4,952); Peoria, IL
Nov 29, 2018*; 7:00 pm		East–West	W 90–67	1–8	Jones Convocation Center (450); Chicago, IL
Dec 1, 2018*; 2:00 pm		Eastern Illinois	W 80–72	2–8	Jones Convocation Center (550); Chicago, IL
Dec 6, 2018*; 7:00 pm		Trinity Christian	W 84–82	3–8	Jones Convocation Center (350); Chicago, IL
Dec 12, 2018*; 7:00 pm, FS1		at DePaul	L 70–104	3–9	Wintrust Arena (3,729); Chicago, IL
Dec 17, 2018*; 8:00 pm, ESPNU		at Northwestern	L 46–88	3–10	Welsh–Ryan Arena (5,954); Evanston, IL
Dec 20, 2018*; 2:00 pm		at Western Illinois	L 52–81	3–11	Western Hall (352); Macomb, IL
Dec 22, 2018*; 2:00 pm, ESPN+		at Northern Illinois	L 59–100	3–12	Convocation Center (765); DeKalb, IL
WAC regular season
Jan 5, 2019; 2:00 pm		at UMKC	L 72–80	3–13 (0–1)	Swinney Recreation Center (894); Kansas City, MO
Jan 12, 2018; 2:00 pm		California Baptist	L 75–77	3–14 (0–2)	Jones Convocation Center; Chicago, IL
Jan 17, 2019; 9:00 pm, ESPN3		at Grand Canyon	L 46–80	3–15 (0–3)	GCU Arena (7,113); Phoenix, AZ
Jan 19, 2019; 9:00 pm, ESPN3		at Cal State Bakersfield	L 73–86	3–16 (0–4)	Icardo Center (2,544); Bakersfield, CA
Jan 24, 2018; 7:00 pm		Seattle	L 47–75	3–17 (0–5)	Jones Convocation Center; Chicago, IL
Jan 26, 2018; 2:00 pm		Utah Valley	L 60–74	3–18 (0–6)	Jones Convocation Center (400); Chicago, IL
Jan 31, 2019; 7:00 pm		at Texas–Rio Grande Valley	L 46–77	3–19 (0–7)	UTRGV Fieldhouse (1,056); Edinburg, TX
Feb 2, 2019; 5:00 pm		at New Mexico State	L 39–83	3–20 (0–8)	Pan American Center (5,375); Las Cruces, NM
Feb 7, 2019; 9:00 pm		at California Baptist	L 44–94	3–21 (0–9)	CBU Events Center (3,027); Riverside, CA
Feb 14, 2018; 7:00 pm		Cal State Bakersfield	L 62–75	3–22 (0–10)	Jones Convocation Center (355); Chicago, IL
Feb 16, 2018; 2:00 pm		Grand Canyon	L 59–90	3–23 (0–11)	Jones Convocation Center (555); Chicago, IL
Feb 21, 2019; 8:00 pm		at Utah Valley	L 71–103	3–24 (0–12)	UCCU Center (2,898); Orem, UT
Feb 23, 2019; 3:00 pm		at Seattle	L 57–77	3–25 (0–13)	Redhawk Center (999); Seattle, WA
Feb 28, 2018; 7:00 pm		Texas–Rio Grande Valley	L 77–82	3–26 (0–14)	Jones Convocation Center (555); Chicago, IL
Mar 2, 2018; 2:00 pm		New Mexico State	L 58–92	3–27 (0–15)	Jones Convocation Center (555); Chicago, IL
Mar 9, 2018; 2:00 pm		UMKC	L 61–76	3–28 (0–16)	Jones Convocation Center (534); Chicago, IL
WAC tournament
Mar 14, 2019; 3:00 pm, ESPN+	(8)	vs. (1) New Mexico State; Quarterfinals	L 49–86	3–29	Orleans Arena; Paradise, NV
*Non-conference game. ^{#}Rankings from AP Poll. (#) Tournament seedings in parentheses. All times are in Central.

Source Source
