= 2018–19 Central Michigan Chippewas men's basketball team =

American college basketball season

2018–19 Central Michigan Chippewas men's basketball

Junkanoo Jam Champions

CBI, First Round
- Conference: Mid-American Conference
- West Division
- Record: 23–12 (10–8 MAC)
- Head coach: Keno Davis (7th season)
- Assistant coaches: Chris Davis; Jeff Smith; Kyle Gerdeman
- Home arena: McGuirk Arena

2018–19 Mid-American Conference men's basketball standings
	Conf.				Overall
Team	W		L	PCT	W		L	PCT
East
No. 15 Buffalo †	16	–	2	.889	32	–	4	.889
Bowling Green	12	–	6	.667	22	–	12	.647
Kent State	11	–	7	.611	22	–	11	.667
Akron	8	–	10	.444	17	–	16	.515
Miami (OH)	7	–	11	.389	15	–	17	.469
Ohio	6	–	12	.333	14	–	17	.452
West
Toledo	13	–	5	.722	25	–	8	.758
Central Michigan	10	–	8	.556	23	–	12	.657
Eastern Michigan	9	–	9	.500	15	–	17	.469
Northern Illinois	8	–	10	.444	17	–	17	.500
Ball State	6	–	12	.333	16	–	17	.485
Western Michigan	2	–	16	.111	8	–	24	.250
† 2019 MAC tournament winner Rankings from AP Poll

The 2018–19 Central Michigan Chippewas men's basketball team represented Central Michigan University during the 2018–19 NCAA Division I men's basketball season. The Chippewas, led by seventh-year head coach Keno Davis, played their home games at McGuirk Arena as members of the West Division of the Mid-American Conference. They finished the season 23–12, 10–8 in MAC play to finish in second place in the West Division. They defeated Western Michigan and Kent State to advance to the semifinals of the MAC tournament where they lost to Buffalo. They were invited to the College Basketball Invitational where they lost in the first round to DePaul.

== Previous season ==
The Chippewas finished the 2017–18 season 21–14, 7–11 in MAC play to finish in fifth place in the West Division. They defeated Bowling Green in the first round of the MAC tournament before losing in the quarterfinals to Buffalo. They were invited to the CollegeInsider.com Tournament where they defeated Fort Wayne and Wofford to advance to the quarterfinals where they lost to Liberty.

== Offseason ==
=== Departures ===
Name	Number	Pos.	Height	Weight	Year	Hometown	Reason for departure
Gavin Peppers	0	G	6'2"	194	RS Junior	Brookeville, MD	Graduate transferred to Nicholls State
A. J. Bullard	3	G	6'9"	187	Freshman	Houston, TX	Transferred to Kilgore College
Andrew Myers	4	G	5'11"	185	RS Junior	Clarkston, MI	Walk-on; didn't return
JaMarrio Rule	10	F	6'3"	260	Freshman	Chicago, IL	Walk-on; left the team for personal reasons
Josh Kozinski	12	G	6'4"	188	RS Senior	Edwardsburg, MI	Graduated
Adam Kozinski	13	G	6'0"	170	Freshman	Edwardsburg, MI	Walk-on; left the team for personal reasons
Cecil Williams	21	F	6'6"	215	Senior	Columbia, MO	Graduated
Luke Meyer	24	F	6'10"	224	Senior	Addison, MI	Graduated
John McCarty	35	F	6'5"	205	Senior	Lake Orion, MI	Walk-on; graduated

=== Incoming transfers ===
Name	Number	Pos.	Height	Weight	Year	Hometown	Previous School
Larry Austin, Jr.	0	G	6'2"	182	RS Senior	Springfield, IL	Transferred from Vanderbilt. Will be eligible to play immediately since Austin, Jr. graduated from Vanderbilt.
Mikhail Myles	4	G/F	6'4"	195	RS Junior	Corunna, MI	Transferred from Davenport. Under NCAA transfer rules, Myles will have to sit out for the 2018–19 season. Will have two years of remaining eligibility. Will join the team as a walk-on.
Rob Montgomery	5	F	6'6"	210	Sophomore	Montgomery Village, MD	Junior college transferred from Indian Hills Community College
Kevin Hamlet	12	F	6'7"	209	Junior	Scarborough, ON	Junior college transferred from Mineral Area College
Dallas Morgan	23	G	6'1"	190	Junior	Chicago, IL	Junior college transferred from Moberly Area Community College
Melo Burrell	24	F	6'7"		Sophomore	Chicago, IL	Junior college transferred from John A. Logan College

=== Recruiting class of 2018 ===
College recruiting information
Name	Hometown	School	Height	Weight	Commit date
P.J. Mitchell; PG	Detroit, MI	Loyola High School	5 ft 9 in (1.75 m)	N/A	
P.J. Mitchell; PG	Recruit ratings: Scout: Rivals: (NR)				
Overall recruit ranking:
Note: In many cases, Scout, Rivals, 247Sports, On3, and ESPN may conflict in their listings of height and weight.; In these cases, the average was taken. ESPN grades are on a 100-point scale.; Sources: "2018 Team Ranking". Rivals.

=== Recruiting class of 2019 ===
College recruiting information (2019)
Name	Hometown	School	Height	Weight	Commit date
Caleb Hodgson #49 C	Dansville, MI	Dansville High School	6 ft 9 in (2.06 m)	225 lb (102 kg)	Oct 10, 2018
Caleb Hodgson #49 C	Recruit ratings: Scout: Rivals: (75)				
Devontae Lane; PG	Iowa City, IA	Indian Hills Community College	6 ft 2 in (1.88 m)	200 lb (91 kg)	Sep 26, 2018
Devontae Lane; PG	Recruit ratings: Scout: Rivals: (JR)				
Travon Broadway; SF	Hollywood, FL	Iowa Western Community College	6 ft 5 in (1.96 m)	200 lb (91 kg)	Oct 16, 2018
Travon Broadway; SF	Recruit ratings: Scout: Rivals: (JR)				
Overall recruit ranking:
Note: In many cases, Scout, Rivals, 247Sports, On3, and ESPN may conflict in their listings of height and weight.; In these cases, the average was taken. ESPN grades are on a 100-point scale.; Sources: "2019 Team Ranking". Rivals.

== Roster ==
2018–19 Central Michigan Chippewas men's basketball team
Players
Coaches

Pos.	#	Name	Height	Weight	Year	Previous school	Hometown
G	0	Larry Austin Jr.	6 ft 2 in (1.88 m)	182 lb (83 kg)	RS Sr	Lanphier; Vanderbilt	Springfield, IL
G	1	Corey Redman	6 ft 6 in (1.98 m)	192 lb (87 kg)	RS Jr	Boyne City	Boyne City, MI
G	2	Shawn Roundtree	6 ft 0 in (1.83 m)	185 lb (84 kg)	RS Sr	Edwardsville; Mineral Area College	Edwardsville, IL
G	3	P. J. Mitchell	6 ft 1 in (1.85 m)	175 lb (79 kg)	Fr	Detroit Edison	Detroit, MI
G	4	Mikhail Myles (W)	6 ft 3 in (1.91 m)	195 lb (88 kg)	RS Jr	Corunna; Davenport	Corunna, MI
F	5	Rob Montgomery	6 ft 6 in (1.98 m)	225 lb (102 kg)	Jr	Mount Zion Baptist Christian School; Indian Hills CC	Montgomery Village, MD
G	10	Colton Webber-Mitchell (W)	6 ft 1 in (1.85 m)	180 lb (82 kg)	Fr	Lakewood	Lake Odessa, MI
C	11	Innocent Nwoko	6 ft 11 in (2.11 m)	232 lb (105 kg)	RS So	New Haven	New Haven, MI
F	12	Kevin Hamlet	6 ft 7 in (2.01 m)	209 lb (95 kg)	Jr	First Love Christian Academy; Mineral Area College	Scarborough, ON
F	14	David DiLeo	6 ft 7 in (2.01 m)	216 lb (98 kg)	Jr	New Hampton School	Iowa City, IA
G	15	Matty Smith	5 ft 11 in (1.8 m)	180 lb (82 kg)	Jr	South Elgin	Elgin, IL
G	20	Kevin McKay	6 ft 5 in (1.96 m)	222 lb (101 kg)	Jr	Warren De La Salle	Warren, MI
G	22	Matt Beachler	6 ft 4 in (1.93 m)	192 lb (87 kg)	So	Lowell	Lowell, MI
G	23	Dallas Morgan	6 ft 1 in (1.85 m)	190 lb (86 kg)	Jr	Metamora; Mineral Area College	Peoria, IL
F	24	Romelo Burrell	6 ft 7 in (2.01 m)	195 lb (88 kg)	So	Morgan Park; John A. Logan College	Chicago, IL
F	25	Austin Ervin (W)	6 ft 5 in (1.96 m)	247 lb (112 kg)	RS Jr	St. Johns	St. Johns, MI
F	31	Michael Kemp (W)	6 ft 3 in (1.91 m)	195 lb (88 kg)	So	Unionville-Sebewaing	Unionville, MI

Head coach

- Keno Davis (Iowa)

Assistant coach(es)

- Chris Davis (Michigan)
- Jeff Smith (Southeast Missouri State)
- Kyle Gerdeman (Alma)

Legend

- (C) Team captain
- (S) Suspended
- (I) Ineligible
- (W) Walk-on
- Injured
- Current redshirt

Roster

== Schedule and results ==
Date time, TV	Rank^{#}	Opponent^{#}	Result	Record	Site (attendance) city, state
Exhibition
Oct 30, 2018*; 7:00 pm		Davenport	W 89–84		McGuirk Arena (1,831); Mount Pleasant, MI
Non-conference regular season
Nov 6, 2018*; 7:00 pm, CSN Digital		Concordia (MI); Junkaoo Jam campus site game	W 98–67	1–0	McGuirk Arena (2,137); Mount Pleasant, MI
Nov 9, 2018*; 7:00 pm, ESPN3		Chicago State	W 101–60	2–0	McGuirk Arena (2,110); Mount Pleasant, MI
Nov 15, 2018*; 6:00 pm, FloHoops		vs. Cal State Bakersfield; Junkanoo Jam Junkanoo Division quarterfinals	W 67–55	3–0	Gateway Christian Academy (325); Bimini, Bahamas
Nov 16, 2018*; 8:30 pm, FloHoops		vs. Weber State; Junkanoo Jam Junkanoo Division	L 76–78	3–1	Gateway Christian Academy; Bimini, Bahamas
Nov 18, 2018*; 6:00 pm, FloHoops		vs. San Jose State; Junkanoo Jam Junkanoo Division	W 76–74	4–1	Gateway Christian Academy (521); Bimini, Bahamas
Nov 25, 2018*; 1:00 pm, CSN Digital		Siena Heights	W 103–75	5–1	McGuirk Arena (1,522); Mount Pleasant, MI
Nov 28, 2018*; 7:30 pm		at Sam Houston State	W 81–65	6–1	Bernard Johnson Coliseum (754); Huntsville, TX
Nov 30, 2018*; 7:30 pm, FSSW		at TCU	L 62–89	6–2	Schollmaier Arena (6,802); Fort Worth, TX
Dec 4, 2018*; 7:00 pm		at Youngstown State	W 100–94 ^{3OT}	7–2	Beeghly Center (1,370); Youngstown, OH
Dec 8, 2018*; 4:30 pm, ESPN3		Southern Utah	W 95–86	8–2	McGuirk Arena (1,832); Mount Pleasant, MI
Dec 19, 2018*; 7:00 pm, ESPN+		UMKC	W 81–72	9–2	McGuirk Arena (1,569); Mount Pleasant, MI
Dec 22, 2018*; 1:00 pm, ESPN3		Jackson State	W 81–72	10–2	McGuirk Arena (1,689); Mount Pleasant, MI
Dec 30, 2018*; 1:00 pm, CSN Digital		IU South Bend	W 123–76	11–2	McGuirk Arena (1,673); Mount Pleasant, MI
MAC regular season
Jan 5, 2019; 2:00 pm, ESPN3		at Miami (OH)	W 84–77	12–2 (1–0)	Millett Hall (1,578); Oxford, OH
Jan 8, 2019; 7:00 pm, ESPN+		Akron	W 88–86	13–2 (2–0)	McGuirk Arena (2,126); Mount Pleasant, MI
Jan 12, 2019; 4:30 pm		Bowling Green	W 97–87 ^{OT}	13–3 (2–1)	McGuirk Arena (3,315); Mount Pleasant, MI
Jan 15, 2019; 8:00 pm, ESPN+		at Northern Illinois	W 78–69	14–3 (3–1)	Convocation Center (1,001); DeKalb, IL
Jan 19, 2019; 4:30 pm, ESPN3		Ball State	L 72–83	14–4 (3–2)	McGuirk Arena (2,204); Mount Pleasant, MI
Jan 22, 2019; 7:00 pm, ESPN+		at Akron	L 67–70	14–5 (3–3)	James A. Rhodes Arena (2,254); Akron, OH
Jan 26, 2019; 7:00 pm, ESPN3		at Toledo	L 72–76	14–6 (3–4)	Savage Arena (5,211); Toledo, OH
Jan 29, 2019; 7:00 pm, ESPN+		Eastern Michigan; Michigan MAC Trophy	W 86–82	15–6 (4–4)	McGuirk Arena (1,719); Mount Pleasant, MI
Feb 2, 2019; 7:00 pm, ESPN+		Western Michigan; Michigan MAC Trophy	W 85–64	16–6 (5–4)	McGuirk Arena (3,325); Mount Pleasant, MI
Feb 9, 2019; 4:30 pm, ESPN+		at No. 23 Buffalo	L 76–90	16–7 (5–5)	Alumni Arena (6,437); Amherst, NY
Feb 12, 2019; 7:00 pm, ESPN+		at Bowling Green	L 72–79	16–8 (5–6)	Stroh Center (1,445); Bowling Green, OH
Feb 16, 2019; 4:30 pm, ESPN+		Ohio	W 87–80	17–8 (6–6)	McGuirk Arena (2,466); Mount Pleasant, MI
Feb 19, 2019; 7:00 pm, ESPN+		Kent State	W 84–74	18–8 (7–6)	McGuirk Arena (1,875); Mount Pleasant, MI
Feb 23, 2019; TBA		at Ball State	W 64–57	19–8 (8–6)	Worthen Arena (4,834); Muncie, IN
Feb 26, 2019; 7:00 pm, ESPN+		at Eastern Michigan; Michigan MAC Trophy	W 77–66	20–8 (9–6)	Convocation Center (1,455); Ypsilanti, MI
Mar 2, 2019; 4:30 pm, ESPN+		Toledo	L 68–80	20–9 (9–7)	McGuirk Arena (2,216); Mount Pleasant, MI
Mar 5, 2019; 7:00 pm, ESPN+		Northern Illinois	L 86–89	20–10 (9–8)	McGuirk Arena (1,709); Mount Pleasant, MI
Mar 8, 2019; 7:00 pm		at Western Michigan; Michigan MAC Trophy	W 82–75	21–10 (10–8)	University Arena (2,686); Kalamazoo, MI
MAC tournament
Mar 11, 2019; 7:00 pm, ESPN+	(5)	(12) Western Michigan; First round	W 81–67	22–10	McGuirk Arena (2,211); Mount Pleasant, MI
Mar 14, 2019; 2:30 pm, ESPN+	(5)	vs. (4) Kent State; Quarterfinals	W 89–81	23–10	Quicken Loans Arena; Cleveland, OH
Mar 15, 2019; 6:30 pm, CBSSN	(5)	vs. (1) No. 18 Buffalo; Semifinals	L 81-85	23–11	Quicken Loans Arena; Cleveland, OH
College Basketball Invitational
Mar 20, 2019*; 8:00 pm		at DePaul; First round	L 86–100	23–12	McGrath–Phillips Arena (1,173); Chicago, IL
*Non-conference game. ^{#}Rankings from AP Poll. (#) Tournament seedings in parentheses. All times are in Eastern Time.

== See also ==
- 2018–19 Central Michigan Chippewas women's basketball team
