= 2018–19 Grand Canyon Antelopes men's basketball team =

American college basketball season

2018–19 Grand Canyon Antelopes men's basketball

CBI, first round
- Conference: Western Athletic Conference
- Record: 20–14 (10–6 WAC)
- Head coach: Dan Majerle (6th season)
- Assistant coaches: Louis Wilson; Chris Crevelone; T. J. Benson
- Home arena: GCU Arena

2018–19 WAC men's basketball standings
	Conf.				Overall
Team	W		L	PCT	W		L	PCT
New Mexico State †	15	–	1	.938	30	–	5	.857
Utah Valley	12	–	4	.750	25	–	10	.714
Grand Canyon	10	–	6	.625	20	–	14	.588
Texas–Rio Grande Valley	9	–	7	.563	20	–	17	.541
California Baptist *	7	–	9	.438	16	–	15	.516
Cal State Bakersfield	7	–	9	.438	18	–	16	.529
Seattle	6	–	10	.375	18	–	15	.545
UMKC	6	–	10	.375	11	–	21	.344
Chicago State	0	–	16	.000	3	–	29	.094
† 2019 WAC tournament winner * Ineligible for WAC tournament (reclassification from NCAA Division II)

The 2018–19 Grand Canyon Antelopes men's basketball team represented Grand Canyon University during the 2018–19 NCAA Division I men's basketball season. They were led by head coach Dan Majerle in his sixth season at Grand Canyon. The Antelopes played their home games at the GCU Arena in Phoenix, Arizona as members of the Western Athletic Conference (WAC). They finished the season 20–14, 10–6 in WAC play, to finish in third place. They defeated Seattle and Utah Valley to advance to the championship game of the WAC tournament, where they lost to New Mexico State. They were invited to the College Basketball Invitational, where they lost in the first round to West Virginia.

== Previous season ==
The Antelopes finished the 2017–18 season 22–12, 9–5 in WAC play, to finish in third place. They defeated UMKC and Utah Valley to advance to the championship game of the WAC tournament where they lost to New Mexico State. They were invited to the College Basketball Invitational where they lost in the first round to Mercer.

== Roster ==
2018–19 Grand Canyon Antelopes men's basketball team
Players
Coaches

Pos.	#	Name	Height	Weight	Year	Hometown
G	0	J.J. Rhymes	6 ft 4 in (1.93 m)	205 lb (93 kg)	Jr	Phoenix, AZ
G	1	Isiah Brown	6 ft 2 in (1.88 m)	175 lb (79 kg)	Jr	Lynnwood, WA
G	2	Trey Drechsel	6 ft 6 in (1.98 m)	205 lb (93 kg)	RS Sr	Woodinville, WA
F	3	Brent Hibbitts	6 ft 8 in (2.03 m)	210 lb (95 kg)	RS Jr	Hudsonville, MI
F	4	Oscar Frayer	6 ft 7 in (2.01 m)	199 lb (90 kg)	Jr	Oakland, CA
F	5	Matt Jackson	6 ft 8 in (2.03 m)	230 lb (104 kg)	RS Sr	Melbourne, Australia
G	11	Damari Milstead	6 ft 2 in (1.88 m)	190 lb (86 kg)	So	Oakland, CA
F	12	Roberts Blumbergs	6 ft 10 in (2.08 m)	220 lb (100 kg)	So	Ventspils, Latvia
F	15	Raef Gerdes	6 ft 7 in (2.01 m)	185 lb (84 kg)	Fr	Lee's Summit, MO
G	22	Caleb Holifield	6 ft 2 in (1.88 m)	185 lb (84 kg)	Fr	Duluth, GA
G	23	Carlos Johnson	6 ft 3 in (1.91 m)	215 lb (98 kg)	Jr	Centralia, IL
G	24	Tim Finke	6 ft 6 in (1.98 m)	215 lb (98 kg)	Fr	Champaign, IL
F	25	Alessandro Lever	6 ft 10 in (2.08 m)	230 lb (104 kg)	So	Bolzano, Italy
G	35	Quinn Smith	6 ft 6 in (1.98 m)	205 lb (93 kg)	Fr	Brooklyn Park, MN
G	42	Gerard Martin	6 ft 7 in (2.01 m)	225 lb (102 kg)	RS Sr	Manly, Australia
F	43	Michael Finke	6 ft 10 in (2.08 m)	235 lb (107 kg)	RS Sr	Champaign, IL

Head coach

- Dan Majerle (Central Michigan)

Assistant coach(es)

- Louis Wilson (William Jewell)
- Chris Crevelone (Adams State)
- T. J. Benson (Grand Canyon)

Legend

- (C) Team captain
- (S) Suspended
- (I) Ineligible
- (W) Walk-on
- Injured
- Current redshirt

Roster
Last update: May 4, 2025

== Schedule and results ==
Date time, TV	Rank^{#}	Opponent^{#}	Result	Record	Site (attendance) city, state
Exhibition
October 30, 2018*; 7:00 p.m., YurView/ESPN3		Montana State Billings	W 97–60		GCU Arena (6,115); Phoenix, AZ
Regular season
November 6, 2018*; 6:00 p.m., ESPN3		at South Dakota State; Summit/WAC Challenge	L 74–79	0–1	Frost Arena (1,933); Brookings, SD
November 10, 2018*; 7:00 p.m., YurView/ESPN3		Delaware State	W 89–47	1–1	GCU Arena (7,122); Phoenix, AZ
November 12, 2018*; 7:00 p.m., YurView/ESPN3		Jacksonville	W 76–59	2–1	GCU Arena (6,572); Phoenix, AZ
November 16, 2018*; 7:00 p.m., YurView/ESPN3		Arkansas State	W 96–72	3–1	GCU Arena (7,121); Phoenix, AZ
November 22, 2018*; 7:00 p.m., ESPN3		vs. Seton Hall; Wooden Legacy quarterfinals	L 75–82	3–2	Titan Gym; Fullerton, CA
November 23, 2018*; 7:00 p.m., ESPN3		vs. Utah; Wooden Legacy consolation	L 66–75	3–3	Titan Gym (2,089); Fullerton, CA
November 25, 2018*; 6:00 p.m., ESPN3		vs. La Salle; Wooden Legacy 7th-place game	W 82–70	4–3	Titan Gym; Fullerton, CA
December 1, 2018*; 7:00 p.m., YurView/ESPN3		Boise State	W 69–67	5–3	GCU Arena (7,317); Phoenix, AZ
December 9, 2018*; 3:30 p.m., ESPNU		vs. No. 6 Nevada; Jerry Colangelo Classic	L 66–74	5–4	Talking Stick Resort Arena (10,172); Phoenix, AZ
December 15, 2018*; 4:00 p.m., LHN		at Texas	L 60–98	5–5	Frank Erwin Center (8,265); Austin, TX
December 19, 2018*; 6:30 p.m., ESPN+		at Northern Iowa	W 73–62	6–5	McLeod Center (3,394); Cedar Falls, IA
December 22, 2018*; 7:00 p.m., YurView/ESPN3		Mississippi Valley State	W 85–64	7–5	GCU Arena (7,255); Phoenix, AZ
December 29, 2018*; 8:00 p.m., TheW.tv		at San Diego	L 58–61	7–6	Jenny Craig Pavilion (2,603); San Diego, CA
January 3, 2019; 6:00 p.m., YurView/ESPN3		Utah Valley	W 71–60	8–6 (1–0)	GCU Arena (7,205); Phoenix, AZ
January 5, 2019; 6:00 p.m., YurView/ESPN3		Seattle	W 71–57	9–6 (2–0)	GCU Arena (7,293); Phoenix, AZ
January 10, 2019; 7:00 p.m., FSAZ+		at New Mexico State	L 75–77	9–7 (2–1)	Pan American Center (5,482); Las Cruces, NM
January 12, 2019; 6:00 p.m., ESPN+		at Texas–Rio Grande Valley	W 69–65	10–7 (3–1)	UTRGV Fieldhouse (725); Edinburg, TX
January 17, 2019; 7:00 p.m., YurView/ESPN3		Chicago State	W 80–46	11–7 (4–1)	GCU Arena (7,113); Phoenix, AZ
January 19, 2019; 7:00 p.m., YurView/ESPN3		UMKC	W 78–50	12–7 (5–1)	GCU Arena (7,215); Phoenix, AZ
January 26, 2019; 8:00 p.m., ESPN+		at California Baptist	W 90–73	13–7 (6–1)	CBU Events Center (4,948); Riverside, CA
February 2, 2019; 8:00 p.m., ESPN3		at Cal State Bakersfield	W 72–59	14–7 (7–1)	Icardo Center (3,515); Bakersfield, CA
February 7, 2019; 7:00 p.m., YurView/ESPN3		Texas–Rio Grande Valley	L 69–72	14–8 (7–2)	GCU Arena (7,097); Phoenix, AZ
February 9, 2019; 7:00 p.m., YurView/ESPN3		New Mexico State	L 64–67	14–9 (7–3)	GCU Arena (7,495); Phoenix, AZ
February 14, 2019; 5:00 p.m., WAC DN		at UMKC	L 75–87 ^{OT}	14–10 (7–4)	Municipal Auditorium; Kansas City, MO
February 16, 2019; 1:00 p.m., WAC DN		at Chicago State	W 90–59	15–10 (8–4)	Jones Convocation Center (555); Chicago, IL
February 21, 2019; 7:00 p.m., YurView/ESPN3		California Baptist	W 91–58	16–10 (9–4)	GCU Arena (7,094); Phoenix, AZ
February 27, 2019*; 7:00 p.m., YurView/ESPN3		Eastern New Mexico	W 95–64	17–10	GCU Arena (6,979); Phoenix, AZ
March 2, 2019; 7:00 p.m., YurView/ESPN3		Cal State Bakersfield	W 73–69	18–10 (10–4)	GCU Arena (7,497); Phoenix, AZ
March 7, 2019; 7:00 p.m., WAC DN		at Utah Valley	L 70–82	18–11 (10–5)	UCCU Center (3,897); Orem, UT
March 9, 2019; 2:00 p.m., WAC DN		at Seattle	L 76–83 ^{OT}	18–12 (10–6)	Redhawk Center (999); Seattle, WA
WAC tournament
March 14, 2019; 8:30 p.m., ESPN+	(3)	vs. (6) Seattle; Quarterfinals	W 84–75	19–12	Orleans Arena (2,374); Paradise, NV
March 15, 2019; 8:30 p.m., ESPN+	(3)	vs. (2) Utah Valley; Semifinals	W 78–74	20–12	Orleans Arena; Paradise, NV
March 16, 2019; 8:30 p.m., ESPNU	(3)	vs. (1) New Mexico State; Championship	L 57–89	20–13	Orleans Arena (3,598); Paradise, NV
College Basketball Invitational
March 20, 2019*; 4:00 p.m.		at West Virginia; First round	L 63–77	20–14	WVU Coliseum (5,313); Morgantown, WV
*Non-conference game. ^{#}Rankings from AP poll. (#) Tournament seedings in parentheses. All times are in Mountain.
