= 2018–19 Mountain West Conference men's basketball season =

- League: NCAA Division I
- Sport: Basketball
- Duration: November 2018 through March 2019
- Teams: 11
- TV partner(s): ESPN, CBSSN, CBS

Regular Season
- League champions: Nevada
- Season MVP: Sam Merrill

Tournament

Mountain West Conference men's basketball seasons
- ← 2017–18 2019–20 →

2018–19 Mountain West Conference men's basketball standings
	Conf.				Overall
Team	W		L	PCT	W		L	PCT
No. 20 Nevada	15	–	3	.833	29	–	5	.853
No. 25 Utah State †	15	–	3	.833	28	–	7	.800
Fresno State	13	–	5	.722	23	–	9	.719
San Diego State	11	–	7	.611	21	–	13	.618
UNLV	11	–	7	.611	17	–	14	.548
Air Force	8	–	10	.444	14	–	18	.438
New Mexico	7	–	11	.389	14	–	18	.438
Boise State	7	–	11	.389	13	–	20	.394
Colorado State	7	–	11	.389	12	–	20	.375
Wyoming	4	–	14	.222	8	–	24	.250
San Jose State	1	–	17	.056	4	–	27	.129
† Mountain West Conference tournament winner Rankings from AP Poll

The 2018–19 Mountain West Conference men's basketball season began with practices in October 2018, followed by the start of the 2018–19 NCAA Division I men's basketball season in November. Conference play begins in January 2019 and concludes in February 2019. The season marks the 19th season of Mountain West Conference basketball.

== Preseason ==
=== Coaching changes ===
On February 26, 2018, Colorado State coach Larry Eustachy resigned after being placed on administrative leave. On March 22, Drake head coach and former CSU assistant coach Niko Medved was hired as the new head coach of Colorado State.

On March 12, 2018, Fresno State head coach Rodney Terry left Fresno State to become head coach at UTEP. He finished at Fresno State with a seven-year record of 126–108. On April 5, it was announced that the school had hired San Diego State assistant coach Justin Hutson as head coach.

On March 11, 2018, Utah State head coach Tim Duryea was fired after three seasons. He finished at Utah State with a three-year record of 47–49. On March 25, reports indicated that the school had hired South Dakota head coach Craig Smith as head coach, which was confirmed the next day.

=== Conference predictions ===
==== Predicted Mountain West results ====
Rank	Team
1.	Nevada (18)
2.	San Diego State (1)
3.	New Mexico
4.	Boise State
5.	Fresno State
6.	UNLV
7.	Wyoming
8.	Colorado State
9.	Utah State
10.	Air Force
11.	San Jose State
(first place votes)

==== Preseason Mountain West teams ====
Honor	Recipient
Preseason Player of the Year	Caleb Martin, Nevada
Preseason Freshman of the Year	Jordan Brown, Nevada
Preseason All-MWC Team
Preseason All-MWC Team	Jordan Caroline, Nevada
Preseason All-MWC Team	Justin James, Wyoming
Preseason All-MWC Team	Caleb Martin, Nevada
Preseason All-MWC Team	Cody Martin, Nevada
Preseason All-MWC Team	Deshon Taylor, Fresno State

== Regular season ==
=== Conference matrix ===
This table summarizes the head-to-head results between teams in conference play.

	Air Force	Boise St	Colorado St	Fresno St	Nevada	New Mexico	San Diego St	San Jose St	UNLV	Utah St	Wyoming
vs. Air Force	–	1–1	2–0	0–1	2–0	1–0	1–1	0–2	1–1	2–0	0–2
vs. Boise St	1–1	–	1–1	2–0	2–0	1–0	1–1	0–2	2–0	1–0	0–2
vs. Colorado St	0–2	1–1	–	1–1	2–0	1–1	1–0	0–1	2–0	2–0	1–1
vs. Fresno St	1–0	0–2	1–1	–	2–0	0–2	0–2	0–2	0–1	1–1	0–2
vs. Nevada	0–2	0–2	0–2	0–2	–	1–1	1–1	0–1	0–2	1–1	0–1
vs. New Mexico	0–1	0–1	1–1	2–0	1–1	–	1–1	1–1	2–0	2–0	1–1
vs. San Diego St	1–1	1–1	0–1	2–0	1–1	1–1	–	0–2	0–2	1–1	0–1
vs. San Jose St	2–0	2–0	1–0	2–0	1–0	1–1	2–0	–	2–0	2–0	2–0
vs. UNLV	1–1	0–2	0–2	1–0	2–0	0–2	2–0	0–2	–	1–0	0–2
vs. Utah St	0–2	0–1	0–2	1–1	1–1	0–2	1–1	0–2	0–1	–	0–2
vs. Wyoming	2–0	2–0	1–1	2–0	1–0	1–1	1–0	0–2	2–0	2–0	–
Total	8–10	7–11	7–11	13–5	15–3	7–11	11–7	1–17	11–7	15–3	4–14
