= 2018–19 San Jose State Spartans men's basketball team =

American college basketball season

2018–19 San Jose State Spartans men's basketball
- Conference: Mountain West Conference
- Record: 4–27 (1–17 MW)
- Head coach: Jean Prioleau (2nd season)
- Assistant coaches: Ryan Cooper; Will Kimble; Jay Morris
- Home arena: Event Center Arena (Capacity: 5,000)

2018–19 Mountain West Conference men's basketball standings
	Conf.				Overall
Team	W		L	PCT	W		L	PCT
No. 20 Nevada	15	–	3	.833	29	–	5	.853
No. 25 Utah State †	15	–	3	.833	28	–	7	.800
Fresno State	13	–	5	.722	23	–	9	.719
San Diego State	11	–	7	.611	21	–	13	.618
UNLV	11	–	7	.611	17	–	14	.548
Air Force	8	–	10	.444	14	–	18	.438
New Mexico	7	–	11	.389	14	–	18	.438
Boise State	7	–	11	.389	13	–	20	.394
Colorado State	7	–	11	.389	12	–	20	.375
Wyoming	4	–	14	.222	8	–	24	.250
San Jose State	1	–	17	.056	4	–	27	.129
† Mountain West Conference tournament winner Rankings from AP Poll

The 2018–19 San Jose State Spartans men's basketball team represented San Jose State University in the 2018–19 NCAA Division I men's basketball season. Led by second-year head coach Jean Prioleau, the Spartans played their home games at the Event Center Arena as members of the Mountain West Conference. They finished the season 4–27, 1–17 in Mountain West play to finish in last place. They lost in the first round of the Mountain West tournament to Air Force.

== Previous season ==
The Spartans finished the 2017–18 season 4–26, 1–17 in Mountain West play to finish in last place. They lost in the first round of the Mountain West tournament to Wyoming.

== Off-season ==
=== Departures ===
Name	Number	Pos.	Height	Weight	Year	Hometown	Reason for departure
Nai Carlisle	2	G	6'2"	200	RS Freshman	West Lafayette, IN	Transferred to Cal State East Bay
Walter Graves III	4	F	6'7"	192	Freshman	Clovis, CA	Transferred to City College of San Francisco
Keith Fisher III	5	F	6'8"	215	RS Freshman	Los Angeles, CA	Transferred to Illinois State
Ryan Parilla	11	G	5'10"	160	Freshman	Union City, CA	Walk-on; transferred to Chabot College
Jalen James	21	G	6'4"	175	Senior	Chicago, IL	Graduated
Ryan Singer	24	F	6'10"	235	RS Junior	Littleton, CO	Left the team for personal reasons
Jaycee Hillsman	25	G	6'6"	213	Junior	Champaign, IL	Transferred to Illinois State
Ryan Welage	32	F	6'9"	205	Junior	Greensburg, IN	Transferred to Xavier

=== Incoming transfers ===
Name	Number	Pos.	Height	Weight	Year	Hometown	Previous college
Michael Steadman	1	F	6'10"	215	Junior	Union City, CA	Junior college transferred from City College of San Francisco
Brae Ivey	2	G	6'2"	175	Junior	Huntington Beach, CA	Junior college transferred from Riverside City College
Sam Japhet-Mathias	14	C	6'11"	280	Junior	London, England	Transferred from Wake Forest. Under NCAA transfer rules, Japhet-Mathias will have to sit out from the 2018–19 season. Will have two years of remaining eligibility.
Craig LeCesne	25	F	6'9"	215	Sophomore	Malmö, Sweden	Junior college transferred from San Bernardino Valley College
Brian Rodriguez	34	G	6'5"	200	Junior	Phoenix, AZ	Junior college transferred from South Mountain CC

=== 2018 recruiting class ===
College recruiting information
Name	Hometown	School	Height	Weight	Commit date
Zach Chappell; PG	Sacramento, CA	Capital Christian	6 ft 3 in (1.91 m)	175 lb (79 kg)	Apr 19, 2018
Zach Chappell; PG	Recruit ratings: Scout: Rivals: 247Sports: ESPN:				
Kaison Hammonds; PG	Highlands Ranch, CO	ThunderRidge High School	6 ft 4 in (1.93 m)	170 lb (77 kg)	May 6, 2018
Kaison Hammonds; PG	Recruit ratings: Scout: Rivals: 247Sports: ESPN:				
Seneca Knight; SG	Lafayette, LA	Northside High School	6 ft 6 in (1.98 m)	N/A	
Seneca Knight; SG	Recruit ratings: No ratings found				
Christian Anigwe; SF	Phoenix, AZ	Desert Vista High School	6 ft 8 in (2.03 m)	190 lb (86 kg)	
Christian Anigwe; SF	Recruit ratings: No ratings found				
Overall recruit ranking: Scout: – Rivals: –
Note: In many cases, Scout, Rivals, 247Sports, On3, and ESPN may conflict in their listings of height and weight.; In these cases, the average was taken. ESPN grades are on a 100-point scale.; Sources: "2017 San Jose State Basketball Recruiting Commits". Scout.; "Scout.com Team Recruiting Rankings". Scout.; "2018 Team Ranking". Rivals.

== Roster ==
2018–19 San Jose State Spartans men's basketball team
Players
Coaches

Pos.	#	Name	Height	Weight	Year	Previous school	Hometown
F	1	Michael Steadman	6 ft 10 in (2.08 m)	210 lb (95 kg)	Jr	City College of San Francisco	Union City, California
G	2	Brae Ivey	6 ft 2 in (1.88 m)	185 lb (84 kg)	Jr	Riverside City College	Huntington Beach, California
G	4	Zach Chappell	6 ft 3 in (1.91 m)	175 lb (79 kg)	Fr	Capital Christian HS	Sacramento, California
G	10	Isaiah Nichols	6 ft 5 in (1.96 m)	180 lb (82 kg)	Jr	Santa Clara HS	Oxnard, California
F	11	Christian Anigwe	6 ft 9 in (2.06 m)	190 lb (86 kg)	Fr	Desert Vista HS	Phoenix, Arizona
G	12	Caleb Simmons	6 ft 6 in (1.98 m)	195 lb (88 kg)	Fr	Desert Vista HS	Vallejo, California
C	13	Oumar Barry	6 ft 11 in (2.11 m)	230 lb (104 kg)	Jr	Iowa Western CC	Conakry, Guinea
C	14	Samuel Japhet-Mathias (redshirt)	6 ft 11 in (2.11 m)	280 lb (127 kg)	Jr	Wake Forest	London, England
G/F	20	Noah Baumann	6 ft 5 in (1.96 m)	180 lb (82 kg)	So	Desert Vista HS	Phoenix, Arizona
G	21	Kaison Hammonds	6 ft 4 in (1.93 m)	170 lb (77 kg)	Fr	ThunderRidge HS	Highlands Ranch, Colorado
G/F	23	Seneca Knight	6 ft 6 in (1.98 m)	190 lb (86 kg)	Fr	Northside HS	Lafayette, Louisiana
F/C	25	Craig LeCesne	6 ft 9 in (2.06 m)	225 lb (102 kg)	Fr	San Bernardino Valley College	Malmö, Sweden
G	34	Brian Rodriguez-Flores	6 ft 4 in (1.93 m)	180 lb (82 kg)	Jr	South Mountain CC	Phoenix, Arizona
C	41	Ashtin Chastain	6 ft 11 in (2.11 m)	245 lb (111 kg)	RS So	Norco HS	Norco, California
G	44	Trey Smith (W)	6 ft 3 in (1.91 m)	175 lb (79 kg)	Fr	Saddleback Valley Christian HS	Cypress, California

Head coach

- Jean Prioleau (Fordham)

Assistant coach(es)

- Ryan Cooper (Notre Dame de Namur)
- Will Kimble (Pepperdine)
- Jay Morris (CSU Dominguez Hills)

Legend

- (C) Team captain
- (S) Suspended
- (I) Ineligible
- (W) Walk-on
- Injured
- Current redshirt

Roster

== Schedule and results ==
Date time, TV	Rank^{#}	Opponent^{#}	Result	Record	High points	High rebounds	High assists	Site city, state
Non-conference regular season
Nov 7, 2018*; 7:00 pm		Life Pacific	W 89–72	1–0	18 – Ivey	13 – Steadman	6 – Ivey	Event Center Arena (1,427); San Jose, CA
Nov 10, 2018*; 6:00 pm		Southern Utah	L 58–66	1–1	15 – LeCesne	14 – Steadman	5 – Ivey	Event Center Arena (371); San Jose, CA
Nov 15, 2018*; 5:30 pm		vs. Weber State; Junkanoo Jam	L 77–85	1–2	20 – Anigwe	13 – Anigwe	7 – Ivey	Gateway Christian Academy; Bimini, Bahamas
Nov 17, 2018*; 3:00 pm		vs. Cal State Bakersfield; Junkanoo Jam	L 72–73	1–3	22 – Ivey	8 – LeCesne	6 – Ivey	Gateway Christian Academy; Bimini, Bahamas
Nov 18, 2018*; 3:00 pm		vs. Central Michigan; Junkanoo Jam	L 74–76	1–4	13 – Tied	7 – Steadman	6 – Ivey	Gateway Christian Academy (521); Bimini, Bahamas
Nov 24, 2018*; 3:00 pm		Santa Clara	L 63–71	1–5	21 – Steadman	11 – Steadman	6 – Ivey	Event Center Arena (1,665); San Jose, CA
Nov 28, 2018*; 7:00 pm		Indiana State; MW–MVC Challenge	L 57–86	1–6	13 – Steadman	4 – Tied	3 – Chastain	Event Center Arena (1,523); San Jose, CA
Dec 6, 2018*; 7:00 pm		Bethune–Cookman	W 67–65	2–6	15 – Steadman	13 – Steadman	4 – Ivey	Event Center Arena (1,497); San Jose, CA
Dec 15, 2018*; 7:00 pm		Northern Arizona	W 79–74	3–6	23 – Baumann	13 – Barry	7 – Ivey	Event Center Arena (1,625); San Jose, CA
Dec 18, 2018*; 7:00 pm, P12N		at Stanford; Rivalry	L 73–78	3–7	17 – Steadman	11 – Steadman	5 – Baumann	Maples Pavilion (2,821); Stanford, CA
Dec 21, 2018*; 7:00 pm, P12N		at California	L 80–88	3–8	18 – Tied	13 – Steadman	4 – Ivey	Haas Pavilion (3,443); Berkeley, CA
Dec 29, 2018*; 5:00 pm		at Saint Mary's	L 45–75	3–9	11 – Barry	7 – Knight	2 – Tied	McKeon Pavilion (3,500); Moraga, CA
Mountain West regular season
Jan 2, 2019; 7:00 pm		Fresno State; Rivalry	L 53–73	3–10 (0–1)	18 – Steadman	10 – Steadman	4 – LeCesne	Event Center Arena (1,886); San Jose, CA
Jan 9, 2019; 8:00 pm, CBSSN		at No. 10 Nevada	L 53–92	3–11 (0–2)	10 – Ivey	12 – Steadman	2 – Tied	Lawlor Events Center (10,432); Reno, NV
Jan 12, 2019; 12:00 pm		at Boise State	L 64–87	3–12 (0–3)	16 – Barry	6 – Barry	7 – Chappell	Event Center Arena (1,419); San Jose, CA
Jan 16, 2019; 7:00 pm		Utah State	L 63–81	3–13 (0–4)	29 – Baumann	6 – LeCesne	3 – Chappell	Event Center Arena (1,388); San Jose, CA
Jan 19, 2019; 4:30 pm, ATTSNRM		at UNLV	L 56–94	3–14 (0–5)	14 – Steadman	7 – Steadman	4 – LeCesne	Thomas & Mack Center (8,623); Paradise, NV
Jan 23, 2019; 6:00 pm		at Wyoming	L 46–59	3–15 (0–6)	10 – Steadman	8 – Steadman	4 – LeCesne	Arena-Auditorium (5,787); Laramie, WY
Jan 26, 2019; 6:00 pm		Air Force	L 71–73 ^{2OT}	3–16 (0–7)	24 – Steadman	13 – Chastain	9 – LeCesne	Event Center Arena (1,498); San Jose, CA
Jan 30, 2019; 6:00 pm		at Utah State	L 73–103	3–17 (0–8)	20 – Steadman	9 – LeCesne	5 – Ivey	Smith Spectrum (6,599); Logan, UT
Feb 2, 2019; 6:00 pm		San Diego State	L 56–67	3–18 (0–9)	14 – LeCesne	11 – Steadman	5 – Ivey	Event Center Arena (2,430); San Jose, CA
Feb 9, 2019; 11:00 am		at Boise State	L 57–105	3–19 (0–10)	16 – Steadman	12 – Anigwe	2 – Baumann	Taco Bell Arena (3,608); Boise, ID
Feb 13, 2019; 6:00 pm, ATTSNRM		at New Mexico	L 60–92	3–20 (0–11)	10 – Baumann	11 – Chastain	3 – Baumann	Dreamstyle Arena (10,469); Albuquerque, NM
Feb 16, 2019; 2:00 pm, ATTSNRM		UNLV	L 64–71	3–21 (0–12)	16 – Steadman	7 – Steadman	9 – Chappell	Event Center Arena (1,658); San Jose, CA
Feb 20, 2019; 7:00 pm		Colorado State	L 70–91	3–22 (0–13)	14 – Knight	8 – Steadman	5 – Ivey	Event Center Arena (1,467); San Jose, CA
Feb 23, 2019; 1:00 pm		at Air Force	L 68–82	3–23 (0–14)	21 – Steadman	17 – Steadman	3 – Ivey	Clune Arena (2,360); Colorado Springs, CO
Feb 26, 2019; 7:00 pm, ATTSNRM		New Mexico	W 89–82	4–23 (1–14)	26 – Baumann	11 – Steadman	9 – Chappell	Event Center Arena (2,053); San Jose, CA
Mar 2, 2019; 7:00 pm		at San Diego State	L 56–84	4–24 (1–15)	14 – Chappell	11 – Steadman	5t – Chappell	Viejas Arena (11,258); San Diego, CA
Mar 6, 2019; 7:00 pm		Wyoming	L 71–81	4–25 (1–16)	27 – Baumann	10 – Steadman	5 – Ivey	Event Center Arena (2,960); San Jose, CA
Mar 9, 2019; 4:00 pm		at Fresno State; Rivalry	L 81–121	4–26 (1–17)	21 – Steadman	9 – Steadman	6 – Chappell	Save Mart Center (7,615); Fresno, CA
Mountain West tournament
Mar 13, 2019; 4:00 pm	(11)	vs. (6) Air Force; First round	L 56–87	4–27	15 – Knight	8 – Steadman	4 – Chappell	Thomas & Mack Center (5,578); Paradise, NV
*Non-conference game. ^{#}Rankings from AP Poll. (#) Tournament seedings in parentheses. All times are in Pacific Time.
