= 2018–19 Wyoming Cowboys basketball team =

American college basketball season

2018–19 Wyoming Cowboys basketball
- Conference: Mountain West Conference
- Record: 8–24 (4–14 MW)
- Head coach: Allen Edwards (3rd season)
- Assistant coaches: Jeremy Shyatt; Jermaine Kimbrough; Shaun Vandiver
- Home arena: Arena-Auditorium

2018–19 Mountain West Conference men's basketball standings
	Conf.				Overall
Team	W		L	PCT	W		L	PCT
No. 20 Nevada	15	–	3	.833	29	–	5	.853
No. 25 Utah State †	15	–	3	.833	28	–	7	.800
Fresno State	13	–	5	.722	23	–	9	.719
San Diego State	11	–	7	.611	21	–	13	.618
UNLV	11	–	7	.611	17	–	14	.548
Air Force	8	–	10	.444	14	–	18	.438
New Mexico	7	–	11	.389	14	–	18	.438
Boise State	7	–	11	.389	13	–	20	.394
Colorado State	7	–	11	.389	12	–	20	.375
Wyoming	4	–	14	.222	8	–	24	.250
San Jose State	1	–	17	.056	4	–	27	.129
† Mountain West Conference tournament winner Rankings from AP Poll

The 2018–19 Wyoming Cowboys basketball team represented the University of Wyoming during the 2018–19 NCAA Division I men's basketball season. They were led by Allen Edwards in his third year as head coach at Wyoming. The Cowboys played their home games at the Arena-Auditorium in Laramie, Wyoming as members of the Mountain West Conference. They finished the season 8–24, 4–14 in Mountain West play to finish in tenth place. They lost in the first round of the Mountain West tournament to New Mexico.

== Previous season ==
The Cowboys finished the 2017–18 season 20–13, 10–8 in Mountain West play to finish in sixth place. They defeated San Jose State in the first round of the Mountain West tournament before losing in the quarterfinals to New Mexico. They did not compete in a post-season tournament.

== Offseason ==
=== Departures ===
Name	Number	Pos.	Height	Weight	Year	Hometown	Reason for departure
Andrew Moemeka	2	F	6'8"	210	RS sophomore	Lake City, FL	Transferred to Palm Beach Atlantic
Alexander Aka Gorski	3	F	6'5"	205	Senior	Lund, Sweden	Graduated
Alan Herndon	5	F	6'9"	210	RS senior	Colorado Springs, CO	Graduated
Cody Kelley	10	G	5'11"	180	RS sophomore	Gillette, WY	Graduate transferred to South Dakota
Sam Averbuck	13	F	6'4"	185	RS sophomore	Santa Rosa, CA	Walk–on; graduate transferred to Dominican University of California
Brodricks Jones	15	F	6'10"	220	RS sophomore	Los Angeles, CA	Transferred to Georgetown College
Hayden Dalton	20	F	6'8"	185	Senior	Parker, CO	Graduated
Louis Adams	24	G	6'4"	185	Senior	Chicago, IL	Graduated
Anthony Mack	25	G	6'6"	218	Freshman	Las Vegas, NV	Transferred to Miami (FL)

=== Incoming transfers ===
Name	Number	Pos.	Height	Weight	Year	Hometown	Previous School
Jake Hendricks	0	G	6'5"	180	Junior	Smithfield, UT	Junior college transfer from College of Southern Idaho
A.J. Banks	2	G	6'2"	175	Junior	Las Vegas, NV	Junior college transfer from Pratt Community College
Lwal Dung	34	F	6'7"	180	Junior	Adelaide, Australia	Junior college transfer from Neosho County CC

=== 2018 recruiting class ===
College recruiting
Name	Hometown	School	Height	Weight	Commit date
Trevon Taylor; SF	Virginia Beach, VA	Hillcrest Preparatory Academy	6 ft 6 in (1.98 m)	185 lb (84 kg)	Oct 14, 2017
Trevon Taylor; SF	Recruit ratings: Scout: Rivals: 247Sports: ESPN:				
Bradley Belt; PG	Huntsville, AL	Washington Academy	6 ft 4 in (1.93 m)	205 lb (93 kg)	Nov 28, 2017
Bradley Belt; PG	Recruit ratings: Scout: Rivals: 247Sports: ESPN:				
Brandon Porter; SF	Virginia Beach, VA	Washington Academy	6 ft 7 in (2.01 m)	190 lb (86 kg)	Jan 12, 2018
Brandon Porter; SF	Recruit ratings: Scout: Rivals: 247Sports: ESPN:				
Tariq Johnson; SG	Baltimore, MD	Mt. Zion Prep	6 ft 5 in (1.96 m)	205 lb (93 kg)	Mar 26, 2018
Tariq Johnson; SG	Recruit ratings: Scout: Rivals: 247Sports: ESPN:				
Trace Young; SF	Hartford, KY	Mt. Zion Prep	6 ft 8 in (2.03 m)	190 lb (86 kg)	Apr 13, 2018
Trace Young; SF	Recruit ratings: Scout: Rivals: 247Sports: ESPN:				
Overall recruit ranking: Scout: – Rivals: –
Note: In many cases, Scout, Rivals, 247Sports, On3, and ESPN may conflict in their listings of height and weight.; In these cases, the average was taken. ESPN grades are on a 100-point scale.; Sources: "ESPN – Wyoming Cowboys Basketball Recruiting 2018". ESPN.; "2018 Team Ranking". Rivals.

== Roster ==
2018–19 Wyoming Cowboys men's basketball team
Players
Coaches

Pos.	#	Name	Height	Weight	Year	Previous school	Hometown
G	0	Jake Hendricks (injured)	6 ft 5 in (1.96 m)	180 lb (82 kg)	RS Jr	Sky View HS; College of Southern Idaho	Smithfield, UT
G	1	Justin James	6 ft 7 in (2.01 m)	180 lb (82 kg)	Sr	Oldsmar Christian HS	Port Saint Lucie, FL
G	2	A. J. Banks	6 ft 2 in (1.88 m)	175 lb (79 kg)	Jr	Cheyenne HS; Pratt CC	Las Vegas, NV
G	5	Tariq Johnson (redshirt)	6 ft 5 in (1.96 m)	200 lb (91 kg)	Fr	Mt. Zion Prep	College Park, MD
F	10	Hunter Thompson	6 ft 10 in (2.08 m)	225 lb (102 kg)	RS Fr	Pine Bluffs HS	Pine Bluffs, WY
G/F	11	Trace Young	6 ft 9 in (2.06 m)	210 lb (95 kg)	Fr	Mt. Zion Prep	Owensboro, KY
G	12	Bradley Belt (redshirt)	6 ft 4 in (1.93 m)	205 lb (93 kg)	Fr	Washington Academy	Huntsville, AL
G/F	13	T. J. Taylor	6 ft 6 in (1.98 m)	185 lb (84 kg)	Fr	Hillcrest Prep	Chesapeake, VA
F	14	Austin Mueller (injured)	6 ft 6 in (1.98 m)	200 lb (91 kg)	RS So	ThunderRidge HS	Highlands Ranch, CO
F	22	Brandon Porter	6 ft 8 in (2.03 m)	190 lb (86 kg)	Fr	Washington Academy	Virginia Beach, VA
G	24	Hunter Maldonado (injured) (redshirt)	6 ft 7 in (2.01 m)	185 lb (84 kg)	So	Vista Ridge HS	Colorado Springs, SO
F	33	Jordan Naughton	6 ft 10 in (2.08 m)	225 lb (102 kg)	Sr	Etiwanda HS	Rancho Cucamonga, CA
G	40	KC Henry (W)	6 ft 0 in (1.83 m)	195 lb (88 kg)	RS So	Lingle-Fort Laramie HS	Lingle, WY
G	55	Haize Fornstrom (W)	6 ft 4 in (1.93 m)	185 lb (84 kg)	Fr	Pine Bluffs HS	Pine Bluffs, WY

Head coach

- Allen Edwards (Kentucky)

Assistant coach(es)

- Jeremy Shyatt (Clemson)
- Shaun Vandiver (Colorado)
- Jermaine Kimbrough (Virginia Tech)

Legend

- (C) Team captain
- (S) Suspended
- (I) Ineligible
- (W) Walk-on
- Injured
- Current redshirt

Roster
Last update: January 12, 2019

== Statistics ==
Player	GP	GS	MPG	FG%	3FG%	FT%	RPG	APG	BPG	SPG	PPG
A.J. Banks	32	18	23.4	.504	.324	.737	2.9	1.5	0.4	0.9	5.2
Lwal Dung	4	0	9.3	.600	.000	.333	1.3	0.3	0.0	0.0	1.8
Haize Fronstrom	12	0	4.5	.500	.429	1.000	0.7	0.2	0.0	0.1	1.3
Jake Hendricks	23	20	36.0	.398	.406	.636	2.9	1.0	0.0	1.0	10.8
KC Henry	4	0	1.5	.000	.000	.000	0.3	0.0	0.0	0.0	0.0
Justin James	32	32	38.2	.409	.296	.741	8.5	4.4	0.6	1.5	22.1
Tariq Johnson	9	0	7.9	.231	.286	.625	0.6	0.0	0.0	0.0	1.4
Hunter Maldonado	8	5	32.5	.420	.333	.625	6.8	2.3	0.5	1.1	13.8
Austin Mueller	8	8	29.5	.345	.222	.750	3.6	0.6	0.6	1.0	3.9
Jordan Naughton	22	10	15.3	.484	.000	.727	2.0	0.4	0.5	0.2	4.5
Brandon Porter	31	1	9.3	.370	.349	.667	1.1	0.2	0.1	0.3	2.5
Nyaires Redding	9	9	28.7	.357	.222	.852	2.2	1.9	0.1	0.6	6.3
TJ Taylor	31	22	26.7	.439	.309	.756	3.1	0.7	0.4	0.5	6.6
Hunter Thompson	27	22	28.1	.427	.375	.707	2.9	0.8	0.5	0.2	8.8
Trace Young	20	13	23.8	.394	.370	.471	3.4	0.8	0.5	0.8	6.8

== Schedule and results ==
Date time, TV	Rank^{#}	Opponent^{#}	Result	Record	Site (attendance) city, state
Exhibition
Nov 1, 2018*; 7:00 pm		Colorado Christian	W 72–69		Arena-Auditorium (3,704); Laramie, WY
Non-conference regular season
Nov 6, 2018*; 8:00 pm, ATTSNRM		UC Santa Barbara	L 66–76	0–1	Arena-Auditorium (3,373); Laramie, WY
Nov 10, 2018*; 1:00 pm, P12N		at Oregon State	L 63–84	0–2	Gill Coliseum (3,791); Corvallis, OR
Nov 14, 2018*; 7:00 pm		Grambling State; Fort Myers Tip-Off	W 86–78	1–2	Arena-Auditorium (3,374); Laramie, WY
Nov 16, 2018*; 7:00 pm		Niagara; Fort Myers Tip-Off	L 69–72	1–3	Arena-Auditorium (2,487); Laramie, WY
Nov 19, 2018*; 7:00 pm, FS1		vs. Boston College; Fort Myers Tip-Off semifinals	L 76–88	1–4	Suncoast Credit Union Arena (4,721); Fort Myers, FL
Nov 21, 2018*; 3:00 pm, FS1		vs. Richmond; Fort Myers Tip-Off consolation final	W 68–66	2–4	Suncoast Credit Union Arena (1,250); Fort Myers, FL
Nov 28, 2018*; 5:00 pm		at Evansville; MW–MVC Challenge	L 78–86	2–5	Ford Center (4,709); Evansville, IN
Dec 1, 2018*; 4:00 pm		Northern Colorado	L 80–85	2–6	Arena-Auditorium (2,752); Laramie, WY
Dec 5, 2018*; 7:00 pm, Stadium		South Carolina	W 73–64	3–6	Arena-Auditorium (3,657); Laramie, WY
Dec 11, 2018*; 7:00 pm		Denver	L 87–90 ^{OT}	3–7	Arena-Auditorium (3,422); Laramie, WY
Dec 21, 2018*; 5:00 pm		vs. East Tennessee State; Sun Bowl Invitational semifinals	L 53–76	3–8	Don Haskins Center (4,284); El Paso, TX
Dec 22, 2018*; 5:00 pm		at UTEP; Sun Bowl Invitational 3rd place game	L 65–76	3–9	Don Haskins Center (4,011); El Paso, TX
Dec 29, 2018*; 4:00 pm		Dixie State	W 65–63	4–9	Arena-Auditorium (3,626); Laramie, WY
Mountain West regular season
Jan 2, 2019; 7:00 pm, Stadium		Boise State	L 55–69	4–10 (0–1)	Arena-Auditorium (3,395); Laramie, WY
Jan 5, 2019; 8:00 pm, ESPNU		at UNLV	L 56-68	4–11 (0–2)	Thomas & Mack Center (7,903); Paradise, NV
Jan 8, 2019; 8:00 pm, CBSSN		at San Diego State	L 54–84	4–12 (0–3)	Viejas Arena (10,130); San Diego, CA
Jan 12, 2019; 4:00 pm, ATTSNRM		Utah State	L 55–71	4–13 (0–4)	Arena-Auditorium (3,426); Laramie, WY
Jan 19, 2019; 4:00 pm, ESPN3		at New Mexico	L 53–83	4–14 (0–5)	Dreamstyle Arena (11,744); Albuquerque, NM
Jan 23, 2019; 7:00 pm		San Jose State	W 59–46	5–14 (1–5)	Arena-Auditorium (5,787); Laramie, WY
Jan 26, 2019; 2:00 pm, Stadium		at Boise State	L 52–77	5–15 (1–6)	Taco Bell Arena (5,093); Boise, ID
Jan 30, 2019; 7:00 pm		Fresno State	L 62–75	5–16 (1–7)	Arena-Auditorium (3,606); Laramie, WY
Feb 6, 2019; 7:00 pm		at Air Force	L 76–81	5–17 (1–8)	Clune Arena (1,798); Colorado Springs, CO
Feb 9, 2019; 12:00 pm, ATTSNRM		Colorado State; Border War	W 74–66	6–17 (2–8)	Arena-Auditorium (5,055); Laramie, WY
Feb 13, 2019; 7:00 pm		at Utah State	L 59–76	6–18 (2–9)	Smith Spectrum (5,458); Logan, UT
Feb 16, 2019; 8:00 pm, ESPNU		No. 7 Nevada	L 49–82	6–19 (2–10)	Arena-Auditorium (5,287); Laramie, WY
Feb 19, 2019; 8:00 pm, CBSSN		UNLV	L 56–66	6–20 (2–11)	Arena-Auditorium (3,432); Laramie, WY
Feb 23, 2019; 12:00 pm, ATTSNRM		at Colorado State; Border War	L 48–83	6–21 (2–12)	Moby Arena (5,026); Fort Collins, CO
Feb 27, 2019; 8:00 pm		at Fresno State	L 60–71	6–22 (2–13)	Save Mart Center (5,339); Fresno, CA
Mar 2, 2019; 4:00 pm, ATTSNRM		Air Force	L 72–80	6–23 (2–14)	Arena-Auditorium (3,991); Laramie, WY
Mar 6, 2019; 8:00 pm		at San Jose State	W 81–71	7–23 (3–14)	Event Center Arena (2,960); San Jose, CA
Mar 9, 2019; 4:00 pm, ESPN3		New Mexico	W 88–81	8–23 (4–14)	Arena-Auditorium (4,113); Laramie, WY
Mountain West tournament
Mar 13, 2019; 2:30 pm	(10)	vs. (7) New Mexico; First round	L 68–78	8–24	Thomas & Mack Center (5,578); Paradise, NV
*Non-conference game. ^{#}Rankings from AP Poll. (#) Tournament seedings in parentheses. All times are in Mountain Time.
