= 2018–19 UNLV Runnin' Rebels basketball team =

American college basketball season

2018–19 UNLV Runnin' Rebels basketball
- Conference: Mountain West Conference
- Record: 17–14 (11–7 MW)
- Head coach: Marvin Menzies (3rd season)
- Assistant coaches: Andre LaFleur; Rob Jeter; Eric Brown
- Home arena: Thomas & Mack Center

2018–19 Mountain West Conference men's basketball standings
	Conf.				Overall
Team	W		L	PCT	W		L	PCT
No. 20 Nevada	15	–	3	.833	29	–	5	.853
No. 25 Utah State †	15	–	3	.833	28	–	7	.800
Fresno State	13	–	5	.722	23	–	9	.719
San Diego State	11	–	7	.611	21	–	13	.618
UNLV	11	–	7	.611	17	–	14	.548
Air Force	8	–	10	.444	14	–	18	.438
New Mexico	7	–	11	.389	14	–	18	.438
Boise State	7	–	11	.389	13	–	20	.394
Colorado State	7	–	11	.389	12	–	20	.375
Wyoming	4	–	14	.222	8	–	24	.250
San Jose State	1	–	17	.056	4	–	27	.129
† Mountain West Conference tournament winner Rankings from AP Poll

The 2018–19 UNLV Runnin' Rebels basketball team represented the University of Nevada, Las Vegas during the 2018–19 NCAA Division I men's basketball season. The Runnin' Rebels were led by third-year head coach Marvin Menzies and played their home games at the Thomas & Mack Center in Paradise, Nevada as members of the Mountain West Conference. They finished the season 17–14, 11–7 in Mountain West play to finish in a tie for fourth place. They lost in the quarterfinals of the Mountain West tournament to San Diego State.

On March 15, head coach Marvin Menzies was fired. He finished at UNLV with a three-year record of 48–48.

On March 27, UNLV hired South Dakota State head coach T. J. Otzelberger as their next head coach.

== Previous season ==
The Runnin' Rebels finished the 2017–18 season 20–13, 8–10 in Mountain West play to finish in a tie for seventh place. They defeated Air Force in the first round of the Mountain West tournament before losing in the quarterfinals to Nevada. Despite having 20 wins, they did not participate in a postseason tournament after declining an invite to the CBI Tournament.

== Offseason ==
=== Departures ===
Name	Number	Pos.	Height	Weight	Year	Hometown	Reason for departure
Jordan Johnson	24	G	5'11"	175	RS Senior	Waukegan, IL	Graduated
Brandon McCoy	44	F	7'0"	250	Freshman	San Diego, CA	Declared for 2018 NBA draft. Went undrafted
Jovan Mooring	30	G	6'2"	200	Senior	Country Club Hills, IL	Graduated

=== 2018 recruiting class ===
College recruiting information
Name	Hometown	School	Height	Weight	Commit date
Bryce Hamilton #61 SG	Pasadena, CA	Pasadena High School	6 ft 2 in (1.88 m)	160 lb (73 kg)	Oct 23, 2017
Bryce Hamilton #61 SG	Recruit ratings: Scout: Rivals: 247Sports: ESPN: (75)				
Joel Ntambwe #39 PF	Kernersville, NC	Forest Trail Academy	6 ft 8 in (2.03 m)	N/A	
Joel Ntambwe #39 PF	Recruit ratings: Scout: Rivals: 247Sports: ESPN: (79)				
Jonathan Tchamwa Tchatchoua; PF	Douala, Cameroon	NBA Global Academy	6 ft 8 in (2.03 m)	230 lb (100 kg)	
Jonathan Tchamwa Tchatchoua; PF	Recruit ratings: Scout: Rivals: 247Sports: ESPN: (0)				
Trey Woodbury #50 SG	Las Vegas, NV	Ed W. Clark High School	6 ft 4 in (1.93 m)	170 lb (77 kg)	Aug 1, 2017
Trey Woodbury #50 SG	Recruit ratings: Scout: Rivals: 247Sports: ESPN: (78)				
Overall recruit ranking:
Note: In many cases, Scout, Rivals, 247Sports, On3, and ESPN may conflict in their listings of height and weight.; In these cases, the average was taken. ESPN grades are on a 100-point scale.; Sources: "2018 UNLV Basketball Commitments". Rivals.; "2018 Team Ranking". Rivals.

=== 2019 recruiting class ===
College recruiting information (2019)
Name	Hometown	School	Height	Weight	Commit date
Ethan Anderson #29 PG	Los Angeles, CA	Fairfax High School	6 ft 4 in (1.93 m)	170 lb (77 kg)	Aug 1, 2017
Ethan Anderson #29 PG	Recruit ratings: Scout: Rivals: 247Sports: ESPN: (80)				
Overall recruit ranking:
Note: In many cases, Scout, Rivals, 247Sports, On3, and ESPN may conflict in their listings of height and weight.; In these cases, the average was taken. ESPN grades are on a 100-point scale.; Sources: "2019 UNLV Basketball Commitments". Rivals.; "2019 Team Ranking". Rivals.

== Roster ==
2018–19 UNLV Runnin' Rebels men's basketball team
Players
Coaches

Pos.	#	Name	Height	Weight	Year	Previous school	Hometown
G	0	Jay Green	6 ft 5 in (1.96 m)	200 lb (91 kg)	So	Hillcrest Prep	Sydney, AU
G	1	Kris Clyburn	6 ft 6 in (1.98 m)	175 lb (79 kg)	Sr	Ranger College	Romulus, MI
G	2	Ben Coupet Jr.	6 ft 7 in (2.01 m)	185 lb (84 kg)	RS So	Simeon Career Academy	Chicago, IL
G	3	Amauri Hardy	6 ft 2 in (1.88 m)	195 lb (88 kg)	So	North Farmington HS	Farmington Hills, MI
G	5	Noah Robotham	6 ft 1 in (1.85 m)	165 lb (75 kg)	RS Sr	Akron	Las Vegas, NV
F	10	Shakur Juiston	6 ft 7 in (2.01 m)	220 lb (100 kg)	Sr	Hutchinson C.C.	Paterson, NJ
F	12	Djordjije Sljivancanin	6 ft 10 in (2.08 m)	230 lb (104 kg)	Jr	IMG Academy	Belgrade, Serbia
G	13	Bryce Hamilton	6 ft 4 in (1.93 m)	200 lb (91 kg)	Fr	Pasadena HS	Pasadena, CA
F	14	Tervell Beck	6 ft 7 in (2.01 m)	230 lb (104 kg)	So	Cleveland Central Catholic HS	Cleveland, OH
F	15	Cheickna Dembélé	6 ft 11 in (2.11 m)	245 lb (111 kg)	Jr	Scotland Performance Institute	Mali, Africa
F	20	Nick Blair (W)	6 ft 5 in (1.96 m)	215 lb (98 kg)	RS Jr	Idaho	Las Vegas, NV
G	22	Trey Woodbury	6 ft 4 in (1.93 m)	200 lb (91 kg)	Fr	Ed W. Clark HS	Las Vegas, NV
F	24	Joel Ntambwe	6 ft 9 in (2.06 m)	210 lb (95 kg)	Fr	Forest Trail Academy	Kinshasa, Congo
F	30	Jonathan Tchamwa Tchatchoua	6 ft 8 in (2.03 m)	230 lb (104 kg)	Fr	NBA Global Academy	Douala, Cameroon
G	31	Marvin Coleman (W)	6 ft 2 in (1.88 m)	180 lb (82 kg)	Fr	Foothill HS	Las Vegas, NV
F	34	Cheikh Mbacke Diong	6 ft 11 in (2.11 m)	220 lb (100 kg)	So	Florida Preparatory Academy	Senegal, Africa
C	43	Louis Bangai (W)	6 ft 10 in (2.08 m)	230 lb (104 kg)	Fr	Scotland Campus Prep	Yaoundé, Cameroon

Head coach

- Marvin Menzies (UCLA)

Assistant coach(es)

- Andre LaFleur (Northeastern)
- Preston Laird (Memphis)
- Eric Brown (Cal State Fullerton)

Legend

- (C) Team captain
- (S) Suspended
- (I) Ineligible
- (W) Walk-on
- Injured
- Current redshirt

Roster

== Schedule and results ==
Date time, TV	Rank^{#}	Opponent^{#}	Result	Record	Site (attendance) city, state
Exhibition
Nov 2, 2018*; 7:00 pm		Montana State Billings	W 83–81		Thomas & Mack Center; Paradise, NV
Non-conference regular season
Nov 10, 2018*; 7:00 pm, ATTSNRM		Loyola Marymount	L 50–61	0–1	Thomas & Mack Center (8,501); Paradise, NV
Nov 13, 2018*; 7:00 pm		UC Riverside	W 72–51	1–1	Thomas & Mack Center (7,327); Paradise, NV
Nov 16, 2018*; 7:00 pm		Oakland	W 74–61	2–1	Thomas & Mack Center (7,439); Paradise, NV
Nov 20, 2018*; 7:00 pm, ATTSNRM		Pacific	W 96–70	3–1	Thomas & Mack Center (7,338); Paradise, NV
Nov 23, 2018*; 7:00 pm		Southern Utah	W 76–71	4–1	Thomas & Mack Center (7,567); Paradise, NV
Nov 28, 2018; 7:30 pm, ATTSNRM		Valparaiso; MW–MVC Challenge	L 64–72	4–2	Thomas & Mack Center (7,587); Paradise, NV
Dec 1, 2018*; 3:00 pm, CBSSN		Cincinnati	L 61–65	4–3	Thomas & Mack Center (9,572); Paradise, NV
Dec 8, 2018*; 11:00 am, BTN		at Illinois	L 74–77	4–4	State Farm Center (12,268); Champaign, IL
Dec 15, 2018*; 5:30 pm, ESPN3		vs. BYU; MGM Resorts Showcase	W 92–90 ^{OT}	5–4	T-Mobile Arena (5,107); Paradise, NV
Dec 22, 2018*; 2:30 pm, ESPNU		at Hawaii; Diamond Head Classic quarterfinals	W 73–59	6–4	Stan Sheriff Center (6,049); Honolulu, HI
Dec 23, 2018*; 1:30 pm, ESPN2		vs. Indiana State; Diamond Head Classic semifinals	L 79–84	6–5	Stan Sheriff Center (5,470); Honolulu, HI
Dec 25, 2018*; 3:30 pm, ESPNU		vs. Bucknell; Diamond Head Classic 3rd place game	L 72–97	6–6	Stan Sheriff Center (5,752); Honolulu, HI
Mountain West regular season
Jan 2, 2019; 7:30 pm, CBSSN		Colorado State	W 78–76	7–6 (1–0)	Thomas & Mack Center (7,881); Paradise, NV
Jan 5, 2019; 7:00 pm, ESPNU		Wyoming	W 68-56	8–6 (2–0)	Thomas & Mack Center (7,903); Paradise, NV
Jan 9, 2019; 8:00 pm, ESPN2		at New Mexico	W 80–69	9–6 (3–0)	Dreamstyle Arena (10,242); Albuquerque, NM
Jan 16, 2019; 8:00 pm, ESPNU		at Air Force	L 88–106	9–7 (3–1)	Clune Arena (3,761); Colorado Springs, CO
Jan 19, 2019; 4:30 pm, ATTSNRM		San Jose State	W 94–56	10–7 (4–1)	Thomas & Mack Center (8,623); Paradise, NV
Jan 22, 2019; 7:00 pm, CBSSN		New Mexico	W 74–58	11–7 (5–1)	Thomas & Mack Center (8,432); Paradise, NV
Jan 26, 2019; 5:00 pm, CBSSN		at San Diego State	L 77–94	11–8 (5–2)	Viejas Arena (11,254); San Diego, CA
Jan 29, 2019; 8:00 pm, ESPN2		No. 8 Nevada	L 70–87	11–9 (5–3)	Thomas & Mack Center (15,786); Paradise, NV
Feb 2, 2019; 1:30 pm, ATTSNRM		at Utah State	L 65–82	11–10 (5–4)	Smith Spectrum (7,157); Logan, UT
Feb 6, 2019; 8:00 pm, ESPNU		at Boise State	W 83–72	12–10 (6–4)	Taco Bell Arena (3,200); Boise, ID
Feb 9, 2019; 2:00 pm, ESPN3		Fresno State	L 65–83	12–11 (6–5)	Thomas & Mack Center (8,324); Paradise, NV
Feb 12, 2019; 7:30 pm, CBSSN		Air Force	W 77–72	13–11 (7–5)	Thomas & Mack Center (7,550); Paradise, NV
Feb 16, 2019; 2:00 pm, ATTSNRM		at San Jose State	W 71–64	14–11 (8–5)	Event Center Arena (1,658); San Jose, CA
Feb 20, 2019; 7:00 pm, CBSSN		at Wyoming	W 66–56	15–11 (9–5)	Arena-Auditorium (3,432); Laramie, WY
Feb 23, 2019; 7:00 pm, ESPNU		San Diego State	L 59–60	15–12 (9–6)	Thomas & Mack Center (10,427); Paradise, NV
Feb 27, 2019; 8:00 pm, CBSSN		at No. 12 Nevada	L 73–89	15–13 (9–7)	Lawlor Events Center (11,289); Reno, NV
Mar 2, 2019; 7:30 pm, CBSSN		Boise State	W 85–81 ^{OT}	16–13 (10–7)	Thomas & Mack Center (9,301); Paradise, NV
Mar 9, 2019; 1:00 pm, ESPN3		at Colorado State	W 65–60	17–13 (11–7)	Moby Arena (3,505); Fort Collins, CO
Mountain West tournament
Mar 14, 2019; 5:30 pm, CBSSN	(5)	(4) San Diego State; Quarterfinals	L 55–63	17–14	Thomas & Mack Center (7,309); Paradise, NV
*Non-conference game. ^{#}Rankings from AP Poll. (#) Tournament seedings in parentheses. All times are in Pacific Time.
