= 2018–19 San Diego State Aztecs men's basketball team =

American college basketball season

2018–19 San Diego State Aztecs men's basketball
- Conference: Mountain West Conference
- Record: 21–13 (11–7 MW)
- Head coach: Brian Dutcher (2nd season)
- Assistant coaches: Dave Velasquez; Rod Palmer; Jay Morris
- Home arena: Viejas Arena (Capacity: 12,414)

2018–19 Mountain West Conference men's basketball standings
	Conf.				Overall
Team	W		L	PCT	W		L	PCT
No. 20 Nevada	15	–	3	.833	29	–	5	.853
No. 25 Utah State †	15	–	3	.833	28	–	7	.800
Fresno State	13	–	5	.722	23	–	9	.719
San Diego State	11	–	7	.611	21	–	13	.618
UNLV	11	–	7	.611	17	–	14	.548
Air Force	8	–	10	.444	14	–	18	.438
New Mexico	7	–	11	.389	14	–	18	.438
Boise State	7	–	11	.389	13	–	20	.394
Colorado State	7	–	11	.389	12	–	20	.375
Wyoming	4	–	14	.222	8	–	24	.250
San Jose State	1	–	17	.056	4	–	27	.129
† Mountain West Conference tournament winner Rankings from AP Poll

The 2018–19 San Diego State men's basketball team represented San Diego State University during the 2018–19 NCAA Division I men's basketball season. The Aztecs, led by second-year head coach Brian Dutcher, played their home games at Viejas Arena as members in the Mountain West Conference. They finished the season 21–13, 11–7 in Mountain West play to finish in a tie for fourth place. They defeated UNLV and Nevada to advance to the championship game of the Mountain West tournament where they lost to Utah State.

== Previous season ==
The Aztecs finished the season 22–11, 11–7 in Mountain West play to finish in a tie for fourth place. They defeated Fresno State, Nevada, and New Mexico to become champions of the Mountain West tournament. As a result, they received the Mountain West's automatic bid to the NCAA tournament. As the No. 11 seed in the West region, they lost to Houston in the first round.

== Offseason ==
=== Departures ===
Name	Number	Pos.	Height	Weight	Year	Hometown	Reason for departure
Patrick Fisher	13	G	6'4"	200	Sophomore	Dallas, TX	Walk-on; didn't return
Montaque Gill-Caesar	31	G	6'6"	216	RS Junior	Vaughan, ON	Left the team for personal reasons
Trey Kell	3	G	6'4"	216	Senior	San Diego, CA	Graduated
Max Montana	10	F	6'9"	210	RS Junior	Calabasas, CA	Left the team to pursue professional opportunities
Malik Pope	21	F	6'10"	220	Senior	Sacramento, CA	Graduated/Went undrafted in 2018 NBA draft
Kameron Rooks	45	C	7'1"	266	RS Senior	San Marcos, CA	Graduated

=== Incoming transfers ===
Name	Number	Pos.	Height	Weight	Year	Hometown	Previous school
Malachi Flynn	22	G	6'1"	170	Junior	Tacoma, WA	Transferred from Washington State. Under NCAA transfer rules, Flynn will have to sit out for the 2018–19 season. Will have two years of remaining eligibility.

=== 2018 recruiting class ===
College recruiting information
Name	Hometown	School	Height	Weight	Commit date
Aguek Arop; SG	Omaha, NE	The B.E.S.T. Academy	6 ft 6 in (1.98 m)	210 lb (95 kg)	May 16, 2018
Aguek Arop; SG	Recruit ratings: Scout: Rivals: 247Sports: ESPN: (N/A)				
Ed Chang #28 PF	Seattle, WA	Garfield High School	6 ft 7 in (2.01 m)	180 lb (82 kg)	Jun 18, 2018
Ed Chang #28 PF	Recruit ratings: Scout: Rivals: 247Sports: ESPN: (81)				
Joel Mensah #26 C	Accra, Ghana	Junípero Serra High School	6 ft 10 in (2.08 m)	210 lb (95 kg)	Aug 12, 2017
Joel Mensah #26 C	Recruit ratings: Scout: Rivals: 247Sports: ESPN: (80)				
Nathan Mensah #34 C	Accra, Ghana	Findlay Prep	6 ft 10 in (2.08 m)	210 lb (95 kg)	Oct 4, 2017
Nathan Mensah #34 C	Recruit ratings: Scout: Rivals: 247Sports: ESPN: (80)				
Overall recruit ranking:
Note: In many cases, Scout, Rivals, 247Sports, On3, and ESPN may conflict in their listings of height and weight.; In these cases, the average was taken. ESPN grades are on a 100-point scale.; Sources: "2018 San Diego St. Basketball Commitment List". Rivals.; "2018 San Diego St. Player Commits". ESPN.; "2018 Team Ranking". Rivals.

== Roster ==
2018–19 San Diego State Aztecs men's basketball team
Players
Coaches

Pos.	#	Name	Height	Weight	Year	Previous school	Hometown
G	0	Devin Watson	6 ft 1 in (1.85 m)	172 lb (78 kg)	RS Sr	El Camino HS; San Francisco	Oceanside, California
G	2	Adam Seiko	6 ft 3 in (1.91 m)	195 lb (88 kg)	RS Fr	Sierra Canyon	Boston, Massachusetts
F	3	Aguek Arop	6 ft 6 in (1.98 m)	216 lb (98 kg)	Fr	Omaha South HS	Omaha, Nebraska
G	4	Michael Sohikish (W)	5 ft 9 in (1.75 m)	160 lb (73 kg)	Sr	University City HS	San Diego, California
F	5	Jalen McDaniels	6 ft 10 in (2.08 m)	195 lb (88 kg)	RS So	Federal Way HS	Federal Way, Washington
G/F	11	Matt Mitchell	6 ft 6 in (1.98 m)	230 lb (104 kg)	So	Roosevelt HS	Riverside, California
G	20	Jordan Schakel	6 ft 6 in (1.98 m)	195 lb (88 kg)	So	Bishop Montgomery HS	Torrance, California
G	22	Malachi Flynn (redshirt)	6 ft 1 in (1.85 m)	177 lb (80 kg)	Jr	Bellarmine Prep; Washington State	Tacoma, Washington
G/F	23	Ed Chang	6 ft 8 in (2.03 m)	210 lb (95 kg)	Fr	Garfield HS	Papillion, Nebraska
C	24	Nolan Narain	6 ft 10 in (2.08 m)	230 lb (104 kg)	RS Jr	La Lumiere School	Hamilton, Ontario
F/C	31	Nathan Mensah	6 ft 10 in (2.08 m)	210 lb (95 kg)	Fr	Findlay Prep	Accra, Ghana
F/C	35	Joel Mensah	6 ft 10 in (2.08 m)	215 lb (98 kg)	Fr	JSerra Catholic HS	Accra, Ghana
G	42	Jeremy Hemsley	6 ft 4 in (1.93 m)	200 lb (91 kg)	Sr	Damien HS	La Verne, California

Head coach

- Brian Dutcher (Minnesota)

Assistant coach(es)

- Dave Velasquez (San Diego State)
- Rod Palmer (UC Irvine)
- Jay Morris (CSU Dominguez Hills)

Legend

- (C) Team captain
- (S) Suspended
- (I) Ineligible
- (W) Walk-on
- Injured
- Current redshirt

Roster

== Schedule and results ==
Date time, TV	Rank^{#}	Opponent^{#}	Result	Record	High points	High rebounds	High assists	Site (attendance) city, state
Exhibition
Nov 1, 2018*; 7:00 pm		Chaminade	W 68–63	–	16 – Tied	7 – Tied	4 – Tied	Viejas Arena (10,675); San Diego, CA
Non-conference regular season
Nov 6, 2018*; 7:00 pm		Arkansas–Pine Bluff	W 76–60	1–0	20 – Watson	9 – McDaniels	5 – McDaniels	Viejas Arena (11,077); San Diego, CA
Nov 14, 2018*; 7:00 pm		Texas Southern; Maui Invitational campus game	W 103–64	2–0	21 – Mitchell	9 – McDaniels	8 – Watson	Viejas Arena (10,507); San Diego, CA
Nov 19, 2018*; 2:00 pm, ESPN2		vs. No. 1 Duke; Maui Invitational quarterfinals	L 64–90	2–1	15 – Watson	5 – McDaniels	3 – Tied	Lahaina Civic Center (2,400); Maui, HI
Nov 20, 2018*; 11:30 am, ESPN2		vs. Xavier; Maui Invitational consolation 2nd round	W 79–74	3–1	26 – McDaniels	8 – McDaniels	7 – Watson	Lahaina Civic Center (2,400); Maui, HI
Nov 21, 2018*; 11:30 am, ESPN2		vs. Iowa State; Maui Invitational 5th place game	L 57–87	3–2	14 – Mitchell	7 – McDaniels	2 – Tied	Lahaina Civic Center (2,400); Maui, HI
Nov 27, 2018*; 7:30 pm, FSSD		Jackson State	W 87–44	4–2	15 – Tied	11 – Mensah	4 – Tied	Viejas Arena (10,453); San Diego, CA
Dec 1, 2018*; 12:00 pm, ESPN3		at Illinois State; MW–MVC Challenge	W 75–65	5–2	23 – Watson	15 – McDaniels	7 – Watson	Redbird Arena (6,245); Normal, IL
Dec 5, 2018*; 7:00 pm, Stadium		San Diego; City Championship	L 61–73	5–3	22 – Watson	8 – McDaniels	3 – Tied	Viejas Arena (11,082); San Diego, CA
Dec 8, 2018*; 7:30 pm, P12N		at California	L 83–89	5–4	20 – McDaniels	6 – Tied	7 – Watson	Haas Pavilion (5,268); Berkeley, CA
Dec 12, 2018*; 7:00 pm		Cal State Dominguez Hills	W 99–46	6–4	20 – Mitchell	7 – Tied	8 – Watson	Viejas Arena (10,283); San Diego, CA
Dec 22, 2018*; 4:00 pm, CBSSN		BYU	W 90–81	7–4	23 – Watson	8 – Schakel	8 – Watson	Viejas Arena (11,321); San Diego, CA
Dec 29, 2018*; 5:00 pm, FSSD		Brown	L 61–82	7–5	19 – McDaniels	7 – Mensah	5 – Watson	Viejas Arena (10,821); San Diego, CA
Jan 1, 2019*; 12:00 pm		Cal State Northridge	W 65–60	8–5	20 – McDaniels	13 – McDaniels	6 – Watson	Viejas Arena (9,971); San Diego, CA
Mountain West regular season
Jan 5, 2019; 7:00 pm, CBSSN		at Boise State	L 64–88	8–6 (0–1)	24 – Watson	5 – McDaniels	3 – Watson	Taco Bell Arena (5,425); Boise, ID
Jan 8, 2019; 7:00 pm, CBSSN		Wyoming	W 84–54	9–6 (1–1)	22 – McDaniels	12 – McDaniels	8 – Watson	Viejas Arena (10,130); San Diego, CA
Jan 12, 2019; 1:00 pm, ESPN3		at Air Force	L 48–62	9–7 (1–2)	18 – McDaniels	11 – McDaniels	4 – Watson	Clune Arena (2,346); Colorado Springs, CO
Jan 16, 2019; 8:00 pm, CBSSN		New Mexico	W 97–77	10–7 (2–2)	24 – McDaniels	11 – McDaniels	9 – Mitchell	Viejas Arena (10,277); San Diego, CA
Jan 22, 2019; 8:00 pm, ESPNU		at Fresno State; Rivalry	L 62–66	10–8 (2–3)	19 – McDaniels	10 – McDaniels	3 – Watson	Save Mart Center (5,792); Fresno, CA
Jan 26, 2019; 5:00 pm, CBSSN		UNLV	W 94–77	11–8 (3–3)	30 – McDaniels	13 – McDaniels	4 – McDaniels	Viejas Arena (11,254); San Diego, CA
Jan 30, 2019; 7:00 pm, Stadium		Air Force	W 66–51	12–8 (4–3)	15 – Watson	11 – McDaniels	5 – Hemsley	Viejas Arena (10,107); San Diego, CA
Feb 2, 2019; 6:00 pm		at San Jose State	W 67–56	13–8 (5–3)	27 – Watson	9 – McDaniels	6 – Watson	Event Center Arena (2,430); San Jose, CA
Feb 6, 2019; 8:00 pm, ESPN2		at New Mexico	L 70–83	13–9 (5–4)	25 – McDaniels	9 – McDaniels	3 – Watson	Dreamstyle Arena (10,279); Albuquerque, NM
Feb 9, 2019; 7:00 pm, ESPN3		Utah State	W 68–63	14–9 (6–4)	23 – Watson	10 – Mensah	3 – Watson	Viejas Arena (10,631); San Diego, CA
Feb 12, 2019; 8:00 pm, ESPN2		at Colorado State	W 71–60	15–9 (7–4)	21 – Watson	12 – McDaniels	3 – Arop	Moby Arena (2,596); Fort Collins, CO
Feb 16, 2019; 4:00 pm, CBSSN		Boise State	W 71–65	16–9 (8–4)	19 – Watson	8 – Mensah	6 – Hemsley	Viejas Arena (11,040); San Diego, CA
Feb 20, 2019; 8:00 pm, CBSSN		No. 6 Nevada	W 65–57	17–9 (9–4)	15 – Tied	9 – Mitchell	8 – Watson	Viejas Arena (12,414); San Diego, CA
Feb 23, 2019; 7:00 pm, ESPNU		at UNLV	W 60–59	18–9 (10–4)	16 – McDaniels	6 – Schakel	4 – Watson	Thomas & Mack Center (10,427); Paradise, NV
Feb 26, 2019; 6:30 pm, CBSSN		at Utah State	L 54–70	18–10 (10–5)	15 – Schakel	8 – Mensah	3 – Arop	Smith Spectrum (8,160); Logan, UT
Mar 2, 2019; 7:00 pm, FSSD		San Jose State	W 84–56	19–10 (11–5)	15 – Hemsley	11 – Mensah	6 – Hemsley	Viejas Arena (11,258); San Diego, CA
Mar 6, 2019; 7:00 pm, CBSSN		Fresno State; Rivalry	L 74–76	19–11 (11–6)	16 – McDaniels	7 – McDaniels	3 – Watson	Viejas Arena (12,414); San Diego, CA
Mar 9, 2019; 7:30 pm, CBSSN		at No. 17 Nevada	L 53–81	19–12 (11–7)	16 – Hemsley	9 – Mitchell	3 – Hemsley	Lawlor Events Center (11,243); Reno, NV
Mountain West tournament
Mar 14, 2019; 2:30 pm, CBSSN	(4)	at (5) UNLV; Quarterfinals	W 63–55	20–12	25 – McDaniels	14 – McDaniels	4 – Watson	Thomas & Mack Center (7,309); Paradise, NV
Mar 14, 2019; 6:00 pm, CBSSN	(4)	vs. (1) No. 14 Nevada; Semifinals	W 65–56	21–12	20 – Watson	10 – McDaniels	5 – Watson	Thomas & Mack Center (8,764); Paradise, NV
Mar 15, 2019; 3:00 pm, CBS	(4)	vs. (2) Utah State; Championship	L 57–64	21–13	18 – Watson	7 – Mensah	3 – Watson	Thomas & Mack Center (8,969); Paradise, NV
*Non-conference game. ^{#}Rankings from AP Poll. (#) Tournament seedings in parentheses. All times are in Pacific Time.
