= 2018–19 New Mexico Lobos men's basketball team =

American college basketball season

2018–19 New Mexico Lobos men's basketball
- Conference: Mountain West Conference
- Record: 14–18 (7–11 MW)
- Head coach: Paul Weir (2nd season)
- Assistant coaches: Chris Harriman; Brandon Mason; Jerome Robinson
- Home arena: Dreamstyle Arena

2018–19 Mountain West Conference men's basketball standings
	Conf.				Overall
Team	W		L	PCT	W		L	PCT
No. 20 Nevada	15	–	3	.833	29	–	5	.853
No. 25 Utah State †	15	–	3	.833	28	–	7	.800
Fresno State	13	–	5	.722	23	–	9	.719
San Diego State	11	–	7	.611	21	–	13	.618
UNLV	11	–	7	.611	17	–	14	.548
Air Force	8	–	10	.444	14	–	18	.438
New Mexico	7	–	11	.389	14	–	18	.438
Boise State	7	–	11	.389	13	–	20	.394
Colorado State	7	–	11	.389	12	–	20	.375
Wyoming	4	–	14	.222	8	–	24	.250
San Jose State	1	–	17	.056	4	–	27	.129
† Mountain West Conference tournament winner Rankings from AP Poll

The 2018–19 New Mexico Lobos men's basketball team represented the University of New Mexico during the 2018–19 NCAA Division I men's basketball season. The Lobos were led by second-year head coach Paul Weir. They played their home games at Dreamstyle Arena, more commonly known as The Pit, in Albuquerque, New Mexico as members of the Mountain West Conference. They finished the season 14–18, 7–11 in Mountain West play to finish in a three-way tie for seventh place. They defeated Wyoming in the first round of the Mountain West tournament before losing in the quarterfinals to Utah State.

== Previous season ==
The Lobos finished the season 19–15, 12–6 in Mountain West play to finish in third place. They defeated Wyoming and Utah State to advance to the championship game of the Mountain West tournament where they lost to San Diego State.

== Offseason ==
=== Departures ===
Name	Number	Pos.	Height	Weight	Year	Hometown	Reason for departure
Matt Vail	0	G	6'0"	145	Freshman	Grants, NM	Walk-on; didn't return
Chris McNeal	1	G	6'1"	185	Junior	Jackson, TN	Transferred to Tennessee Tech
Sam Logwood	2	G/F	6'7"	215	Senior	Indianapolis, IN	Graduated
Antino Jackson	3	G	5'11"	170	Senior	Houston, TX	Graduated
Joe Furstinger	5	F	6'9"	230	Senior	Rancho Santa Margarita, CA	Graduated
Jachai Simmons	11	G/F	6'7"	180	Junior	Plainfield, NJ	Transferred
Troy Simons	31	G	6'2"	195	Junior	Pittsburgh, PA	Transferred to Kent State
Connor MacDougall	55	F	6'9"	230	RS Junior	Tempe, AZ	Graduate transferred to Utah Valley

=== Incoming transfers ===
Name	Number	Pos.	Height	Weight	Year	Hometown	Previous college
Zane Martin	0	G	6'4"	205	Junior	Philadelphia, PA	Transfer from Towson. Under NCAA transfer rules, Martin will have to sit out the 2018–19 season. Will have two years of remaining eligibility.
Corey Manigault	1	F	6'9"	230	Junior	Suitland, MD	Junior college transfer from Indian Hills CC. Manigault is eligible to play immediately.
Keith McGee	3	G	6'2"		Sophomore	Rochester, NY	Junior college transfer from South Plains College. McGee is eligible to play immediately.
Karim Ezzeddine	25	F	6'9"		Junior	Paris, France	Junior college transfer from Northwest Florida State College. Ezzeddine is eligible to play immediately.
Carlton Bragg Jr.		F	6'10"	240	RS Junior	Cleveland, OH	Mid-season transfer from Arizona State. Pending NCAA decision, Bragg will either sit out the first half of the season or have immediate eligibility.

=== 2018 recruiting class ===
College recruiting information
Name	Hometown	School	Height	Weight	Commit date
Drue Drinnon #31 PG	Mableton, GA	University School	6 ft 0 in (1.83 m)	165 lb (75 kg)	Oct 29, 2017
Drue Drinnon #31 PG	Recruit ratings: Scout: Rivals: 247Sports: ESPN: (81)				
Tavian Percy; PG	Pasadena, CA	Pasadena High School	6 ft 5 in (1.96 m)	185 lb (84 kg)	May 9, 2018
Tavian Percy; PG	Recruit ratings: Scout: Rivals: 247Sports: ESPN: (NR)				
Overall recruit ranking:
Note: In many cases, Scout, Rivals, 247Sports, On3, and ESPN may conflict in their listings of height and weight.; In these cases, the average was taken. ESPN grades are on a 100-point scale.; Sources:

== Roster ==
2018–19 New Mexico Lobos men's basketball team
Players
Coaches

Pos.	#	Name	Height	Weight	Year	Previous school	Hometown
G	0	Zane Martin (redshirt)	6 ft 4 in (1.93 m)	205 lb (93 kg)	Jr	Towson	Philadelphia, Pennsylvania
F	1	Corey Manigault	6 ft 9 in (2.06 m)	225 lb (102 kg)	Jr	Indian Hills C.C.	Suitland, Maryland
G/F	2	Vance Jackson	6 ft 9 in (2.06 m)	230 lb (104 kg)	RS So	Connecticut	Los Angeles, California
PG	3	Keith McGee	6 ft 3 in (1.91 m)	175 lb (79 kg)	RS So	South Plains College	Rochester, New York
G	4	Tavian Percy	6 ft 5 in (1.96 m)	195 lb (88 kg)	Fr	Pasadena HS	Miami, Florida
G/F	10	Makuach Maluach	6 ft 7 in (2.01 m)	190 lb (86 kg)	So	Newington College	Sydney, Australia
G	13	JaQuan Lyle	6 ft 5 in (1.96 m)	210 lb (95 kg)	RS Jr	Ohio State	Evansville, Indiana
G/F	14	Dane Kuiper	6 ft 7 in (2.01 m)	205 lb (93 kg)	Sr	Corona del Sol HS	Wasilla, Alaska
F/C	15	Vladimir Pinchuk	6 ft 11 in (2.11 m)	235 lb (107 kg)	So	Phoenix Hagen	Hagen, Germany
G	22	Drue Drinnon	6 ft 0 in (1.83 m)	170 lb (77 kg)	Fr	NSU University School	Smyrna, Georgia
F	25	Karim Ezzeddine	6 ft 8 in (2.03 m)	225 lb (102 kg)	Jr	NW Florida State College	Paris, France
G	32	Anthony Mathis	6 ft 3 in (1.91 m)	175 lb (79 kg)	Sr	West Linn High HS	West Linn, Oregon
F	33	Jordan Arroyo (W)	6 ft 7 in (2.01 m)	205 lb (93 kg)	Fr	Atrisco Heritage Academy	Albuquerque, New Mexico
F	35	Carlton Bragg Jr.	6 ft 10 in (2.08 m)	225 lb (102 kg)	RS Jr	Arizona State	Cleveland, Ohio

Head coach

- Paul Weir (York)

Assistant coach(es)

- Chris Harriman (Augusta State)
- Brandon Mason (New Mexico State)
- Jerome Robinson (Bradley)

Legend

- (C) Team captain
- (S) Suspended
- (I) Ineligible
- (W) Walk-on
- Injured
- Current redshirt

Roster

== Schedule and results ==
Date time, TV	Rank^{#}	Opponent^{#}	Result	Record	Site (attendance) city, state
Exhibition
Nov 10, 2018*; 7:00 pm		Northern New Mexico	W 115–66		Dreamstyle Arena (10,810); Albuquerque, NM
Non-conference regular season
Nov 6, 2018*; 8:00 pm		at Cal State Northridge	W 87–84	1–0	Matadome (1,896); Northridge, CA
Nov 13, 2018*; 7:00 pm		Iona	W 90–83	2–0	Dreamstyle Arena (10,188); Albuquerque, NM
Nov 17, 2018*; 4:00 pm, ATTSNRM		New Mexico State; Rio Grande Rivalry	L 94–98	2–1	Dreamstyle Arena (14,393); Albuquerque, NM
Nov 24, 2018*; 5:30 pm		UTEP	W 84–78	3–1	Dreamstyle Arena (11,266); Albuquerque, NM
Dec 1, 2018*; 6:00 pm		at Bradley; MW–MVC Challenge	W 85–75	4–1	Carver Arena (5,494); Peoria, IL
Dec 4, 2018*; 7:00 pm		at New Mexico State; Rio Grande Rivalry	L 65–100	4–2	Pan American Center (6,777); Las Cruces, NM
Dec 7, 2018*; 5:00 pm		vs. Saint Mary's; Basketball Hall of Fame Classic	L 60–85	4–3	Staples Center (7,235); Los Angeles, CA
Dec 11, 2018*; 7:00 pm, ESPN2		Colorado	L 75–78	4–4	Dreamstyle Arena (10,800); Albuquerque, NM
Dec 16, 2018*; 2:00 pm, ATTSNRM		Central Arkansas	W 82–70	5–4	Dreamstyle Arena (10,082); Albuquerque, NM
Dec 18, 2018*; 7:00 pm		North Texas	L 65–74	5–5	Dreamstyle Arena (9,944); Albuquerque, NM
Dec 22, 2018*; 2:00 pm		Penn	L 65–75	5–6	Dreamstyle Arena (10,874); Albuquerque, NM
Dec 30, 2018*; 2:00 pm		at Southwest (NM)	W 103–47	6–6	Ralph Tasker Arena (1,200); Hobbs, NM
Mountain West regular season
Jan 2, 2019; 7:00 pm, ATTSNRM		at Air Force	W 65–58	7–6 (1–0)	Clune Arena (1,927); Colorado Springs, CO
Jan 5, 2019; 6:00 pm, ESPNU		No. 6 Nevada	W 85–58	8–6 (2–0)	Dreamstyle Arena (12,702); Albuquerque, NM
Jan 8, 2019; 9:00 pm, ESPN2		UNLV	L 69–80	8–7 (2–1)	Dreamstyle Arena (10,242); Albuquerque, NM
Jan 12, 2019; 2:00 pm, CBSSN		at Colorado State	L 76–91	8–8 (2–2)	Moby Arena (3,057); Fort Collins, CO
Jan 15, 2019; 9:00 pm, CBSSN		at San Diego State	L 77–97	8–9 (2–3)	Viejas Arena (10,277); San Diego, CA
Jan 19, 2019; 4:00 pm, ESPN3		Wyoming	W 83–53	9–9 (3–3)	Dreamstyle Arena (11,744); Albuquerque, NM
Jan 22, 2019; 8:00 pm, CBSSN		at UNLV	L 58–74	9–10 (3–4)	Thomas & Mack Center (8,432); Paradise, NV
Jan 26, 2019; 2:00 pm, CBSSN		Utah State	W 68–66	9–11 (3–5)	Dreamstyle Arena (10,752); Albuquerque, NM
Feb 2, 2019; 8:00 pm, ESPNU		at Fresno State	L 70–82	9–12 (3–6)	Save Mart Center (7,657); Fresno, CA
Feb 5, 2019; 9:00 pm, ESPN2		San Diego State	W 83–70	10–12 (4–6)	Dreamstyle Arena (10,279); Albuquerque, NM
Feb 9, 2019; 4:00 pm, CBSSN		at No. 6 Nevada	L 62–91	10–13 (4–7)	Lawlor Events Center (11,197); Reno, NV
Feb 13, 2019; 7:00 pm, ATTSNRM		San Jose State	W 92–60	11–13 (5–7)	Dreamstyle Arena (10,469); Albuquerque, NM
Feb 16, 2019; 5:00 pm, ESPN3		Fresno State	L 73–81	11–14 (5–8)	Dreamstyle Arena (12,494); Albuquerque, NM
Feb 20, 2019; 9:00 pm, ESPNU		at Utah State	L 55–71	11–15 (5–9)	Smith Spectrum (6,273); Logan, UT
Feb 26, 2019; 8:00 pm, ATTSNRM		at San Jose State	L 82–89	11–16 (5–10)	Event Center Arena (2,053); San Jose, CA
Mar 2, 2019; 8:00 pm, ESPNU		Colorado State	W 77–65	12–16 (6–10)	Dreamstyle Arena (11,207); Albuquerque, NM
Mar 6, 2019; 7:00 pm, ESPN3		Boise State	W 73–72	13–16 (7–10)	Dreamstyle Arena (10,279); Albuquerque, NM
Mar 9, 2019; 4:00 pm, ESPN3		at Wyoming	L 81–88	13–17 (7–11)	Arena-Auditorium (4,113); Laramie, WY
Mountain West tournament
Mar 13, 2019; 2:30 pm, Stadium	(7)	vs. (10) Wyoming; First round	W 78–68	14–17	Thomas & Mack Center (5,578); Paradise, NV
Mar 14, 2019; 7:00 pm, CBSSN	(7)	vs. (2) Utah State; Quarterfinals	L 83–91	14–18	Thomas & Mack Center (7,518); Paradise, NV
*Non-conference game. ^{#}Rankings from AP Poll. (#) Tournament seedings in parentheses. All times are in Mountain Time.
