= 2018–19 Air Force Falcons men's basketball team =

American college basketball season

2018–19 Air Force Falcons men's basketball
- Conference: Mountain West Conference
- Record: 14–18 (8–10 MW)
- Head coach: Dave Pilipovich (7th season)
- Assistant coaches: Kurt Kanaskie; Andrew Moore; Nate Zandt; Chris Davis
- Home arena: Clune Arena

2018–19 Mountain West Conference men's basketball standings
	Conf.				Overall
Team	W		L	PCT	W		L	PCT
No. 20 Nevada	15	–	3	.833	29	–	5	.853
No. 25 Utah State †	15	–	3	.833	28	–	7	.800
Fresno State	13	–	5	.722	23	–	9	.719
San Diego State	11	–	7	.611	21	–	13	.618
UNLV	11	–	7	.611	17	–	14	.548
Air Force	8	–	10	.444	14	–	18	.438
New Mexico	7	–	11	.389	14	–	18	.438
Boise State	7	–	11	.389	13	–	20	.394
Colorado State	7	–	11	.389	12	–	20	.375
Wyoming	4	–	14	.222	8	–	24	.250
San Jose State	1	–	17	.056	4	–	27	.129
† Mountain West Conference tournament winner Rankings from AP Poll

The 2018–19 Air Force Falcons men's basketball team represented the United States Air Force Academy during the 2018–19 NCAA Division I men's basketball season. The Falcons, led by seventh-year head coach Dave Pilipovich, played their home games at Clune Arena on the Air Force Academy's main campus in Colorado Springs, Colorado. They finished the season 14–18, 8–10 in Mountain West play, and had the sixth-best conference record in the Mountain West. They defeated San Jose State in the first round of the Mountain West tournament before losing in the quarterfinals to Fresno State.

== Previous season ==
The Falcons finished the 2017–18 season 12–19, 6–12 in Mountain West play, to finish in ninth place. They lost in the first round of the Mountain West tournament to UNLV.

== Offseason ==
=== Departures ===
Name	Number	Pos.	Height	Weight	Year	Hometown	Reason for departure
Dane Norman	1	F	6'9"	190	Junior	San Diego, CA	Left team
C. J. Siples	2	G	6'3"	170	Junior	Cibolo, TX	Left team
Jacob Van	15	G	6'1"	175	Senior	Mansfield, TX	Graduated
Trevor Lyons	20	G	6'3"	190	Senior	Newport News, VA	Graduated
Javen Gumber	21	F	6'8"	200	Freshman	Craig, CO	Left team
Bryce Hughes	25	G	6'3"	190	Freshman	San Antonio, TX	Left team
Jonathan DeWane	30	F	6'8"	205	Sophomore	Jacksonville, FL	Left team
Ryan Manning	32	F	6'6"	200	Senior	Sacramento, CA	Graduated
Frank Toohey	33	C	6'7"	220	Senior	Elmhurst, IL	Graduated
Kole Cerjan	40	C	6'7"	210	Freshman	Colorado Springs, CO	Left team
Peyton Spires	41	F	6'7"	225	Freshman	Mobile, AL	Left team

=== 2018 recruiting class ===
There was no recruiting class for 2018.

== Roster ==
2018–19 Air Force Falcons men's basketball team
Players
Coaches

Pos.	#	Name	Height	Weight	Year	Previous school	Hometown
G	0	Caleb Morris	6 ft 4 in (1.93 m)	185 lb (84 kg)	Jr	Army and Navy Academy	Vista, CA
G	2	Zach Couper	6 ft 4 in (1.93 m)	205 lb (93 kg)	Fr	Boylan Catholic	Rockford, IL
G	3	Sid Tomes	6 ft 4 in (1.93 m)	205 lb (93 kg)	Jr	East Ridge	Woodbury, MN
G	5	Christopher Joyce	6 ft 6 in (1.98 m)	196 lb (89 kg)	So	Bishop Kenny	Jacksonville, FL
G	10	A. J. Walker	6 ft 2 in (1.88 m)	190 lb (86 kg)	Fr	St. Mary's Hall	San Angelo, TX
F	11	Ameka Akaya	6 ft 6 in (1.98 m)	215 lb (98 kg)	So	St. Maria Goretti	Hagerstown, MD
F	12	Lavelle Scottie	6 ft 6 in (1.98 m)	200 lb (91 kg)	Jr	Arlington Heights	Fort Worth, TX
G	13	LeSean Brown	6 ft 2 in (1.88 m)	185 lb (84 kg)	Jr	TMI Episcopal	San Antonio, TX
G	14	Nic Wells	6 ft 6 in (1.98 m)	210 lb (95 kg)	Jr	Walton	Riverdale, GA
F	15	Abe Kinrade	6 ft 7 in (2.01 m)	180 lb (82 kg)	Fr	Maquoketa	Maquoketa, IA
F	20	Isaac Monson	6 ft 8 in (2.03 m)	205 lb (93 kg)	Fr	Olympus	Salt Lake City, UT
G	21	Nick Rene	6 ft 0 in (1.83 m)	180 lb (82 kg)	Fr	Lakeview Centennial	Garland, TX
G	22	Pervis Louder	6 ft 4 in (1.93 m)	187 lb (85 kg)	Sr	Village Christian Academy	Raleigh, NC
G	24	Charles O'Briant	6 ft 8 in (2.03 m)	205 lb (93 kg)	So	Greater Atlanta Christian	Johns Creek, GA
G	25	Bryce Hughes	6 ft 4 in (1.93 m)	195 lb (88 kg)	So	Johnson	San Antonio, TX
F	34	Ryan Swan	6 ft 6 in (1.98 m)	225 lb (102 kg)	Jr	Overland	Aurora, CO
F	35	James Edwards	6 ft 0 in (1.83 m)	165 lb (75 kg)	So	Plum	Allison Park, PA
G	44	Keaton Van Soelen	6 ft 7 in (2.01 m)	190 lb (86 kg)	So	Des Moines Christian	Waukee, IA

Head coach

- Dave Pilipovich (Thiel)

Assistant coach(es)

- Kurt Kanaskie (La Salle)
- Andy Moore (Muskingum)
- Nate Zandt (Michigan)
- Chris Davis (Michigan)

Legend

- (C) Team captain
- (S) Suspended
- (I) Ineligible
- (W) Walk-on
- Injured
- Current redshirt

Roster
Last update: August 2, 2024

== Schedule and results ==
Date time, TV	Rank^{#}	Opponent^{#}	Result	Record	Site (attendance) city, state
Exhibition
November 1, 2018*; 7:00 p.m.		Western State Colorado	L 64–84		Clune Arena; Colorado Springs, CO
Non-conference regular season
November 6, 2018*; 5:00 p.m.		Johnson & Wales (CO)	W 90–65	1–0	Clune Arena (1,083); Colorado Springs, CO
November 9, 2018*; 6:00 p.m.		at Texas State	L 57–67	1–1	Strahan Coliseum (4,058); San Marcos, TX
November 16, 2018*; 1:30 p.m.		vs. UMBC; Bimini Jam	L 72–77 ^{2OT}	1–2	Gateway Christian Academy (527); Bimini, Bahamas
November 18, 2018*; 1:30 p.m.		vs. South Dakota; Bimini Jam	W 65–62	2–2	Gateway Christian Academy (514); Bimini, Bahamas
November 19, 2018*; 4:00 p.m.		vs. High Point; Bimini Jam	L 62–69	2–3	Gateway Christian Academy (561); Bimini, Bahamas
November 24, 2018*; 4:00 p.m., ATTSNRM		Colorado	L 56–93	2–4	Clune Arena (2,704); Colorado Springs, CO
November 28, 2018*; 7:15 p.m.		Missouri State; MW–MVC Challenge	W 88–69	3–4	Clune Arena (1,629); Colorado Springs, CO
December 1, 2018*; 8:00 p.m.		at Pacific	L 69–82	3–5	Alex G. Spanos Center (1,767); Stockton, CA
December 5, 2018*; 7:00 p.m.		Denver	W 73–65	4–5	Clune Arena (1,601); Colorado Springs, CO
December 8, 2018*; 2:00 p.m.		Army	L 61–66	4–6	Clune Arena (1,976); Colorado Springs, CO
December 22, 2018*; 2:00 p.m., BTN		at No. 4 Michigan	L 50–71	4–7	Crisler Arena (12,707); Ann Arbor, MI
December 28, 2018*; 6:00 p.m.		UC Riverside	W 72–60	5–7	Clune Arena (1,366); Colorado Springs, CO
Mountain West regular season
January 2, 2019; 7:00 p.m., ATTSNRM		New Mexico	L 58–65	5–8 (0–1)	Clune Arena (1,927); Colorado Springs, CO
January 5, 2019; 7:00 p.m.		at Utah State	L 62–79	5–9 (0–2)	Smith Spectrum (8,412); Logan, UT
January 8, 2019; 7:00 p.m., ATTSNRM		at Colorado State	L 64–87	5–10 (0–3)	Moby Arena (2,268); Fort Collins, CO
January 12, 2019; 2:00 p.m., ESPN3		San Diego State	W 62–48	6–10 (1–3)	Clune Arena (2,346); Colorado Springs, CO
January 16, 2019; 9:00 p.m., ESPNU		UNLV	W 106–88	7–10 (2–3)	Clune Arena (3,761); Colorado Springs, CO
January 19, 2019; 8:00 p.m., ESPNU		at No. 10 Nevada	L 52–67	7–11 (2–4)	Lawlor Events Center (11,222); Reno, NV
January 22, 2019; 7:00 p.m., ATTSNRM		Boise State	W 74–60	8–11 (3–4)	Clune Arena (1,790); Colorado Springs, CO
January 26, 2019; 7:00 p.m.		at San Jose State	W 73–71 ^{2OT}	9–11 (4–4)	Event Center Arena (1,498); San Jose, CA
January 30, 2019; 8:00 p.m., Stadium		at San Diego State	L 51–66	9–12 (4–5)	Viejas Arena (10,107); San Diego, CA
February 2, 2019; 2:00 p.m.		Colorado State	L 53–85	9–13 (4–6)	Clune Arena (3,215); Colorado Springs, CO
February 6, 2019; 7:00 p.m.		Wyoming	W 81–76	10–13 (5–6)	Clune Arena (1,798); Colorado Springs, CO
February 12, 2019; 8:30 p.m., CBSSN		at UNLV	L 72–77	10–14 (5–7)	Thomas & Mack Center (7,550); Paradise, NV
February 16, 2019; 2:00 p.m.		Utah State	L 62–76	10–15 (5–8)	Clune Arena (3,037); Colorado Springs, CO
February 20, 2019; 8:00 p.m., ATTSNRM		at Fresno State	W 64–60	11–15 (6–8)	Save Mart Center (5,190); Fresno, CA
February 23, 2019; 2:00 p.m.		San Jose State	W 82–68	12–15 (7–8)	Clune Arena (2,360); Colorado Springs, CO
March 2, 2019; 4:00 p.m., ATTSN		at Wyoming	W 80–72	13–15 (8–8)	Arena-Auditorium (3,991); Laramie, WY
March 5, 2019; 9:00 p.m., ESPN2		No. 17 Nevada	L 79–90	13–16 (8–9)	Clune Arena (3,852); Colorado Springs, CO
March 9, 2019; 5:00 p.m., ATTSNRM		at Boise State	W 80–52	13–17 (8–10)	Taco Bell Arena (5,677); Boise, ID
Mountain West tournament
March 13, 2019; 4:00 p.m., Stadium	(6)	vs. (11) San Jose State; First round	W 87–56	14–17	Thomas & Mack Center (5,578); Paradise, NV
March 14, 2019; 7:30 p.m., CBSSN	(6)	vs. (3) Fresno State; Quarterfinals	L 50–76	14–18	Thomas & Mack Center (7,518); Paradise, NV
*Non-conference game. ^{#}Rankings from AP poll. (#) Tournament seedings in parentheses. All times are in Mountain.
