= 2018–19 Colorado State Rams men's basketball team =

American college basketball season

2018–19 Colorado State Rams men's basketball
- Conference: Mountain West Conference
- Record: 12–20 (7–11 MW)
- Head coach: Niko Medved (1st season)
- Assistant coaches: Dave Thorson; JR Blount; Ali Farokhmanesh
- Home arena: Moby Arena

2018–19 Mountain West Conference men's basketball standings
	Conf.				Overall
Team	W		L	PCT	W		L	PCT
No. 20 Nevada	15	–	3	.833	29	–	5	.853
No. 25 Utah State †	15	–	3	.833	28	–	7	.800
Fresno State	13	–	5	.722	23	–	9	.719
San Diego State	11	–	7	.611	21	–	13	.618
UNLV	11	–	7	.611	17	–	14	.548
Air Force	8	–	10	.444	14	–	18	.438
New Mexico	7	–	11	.389	14	–	18	.438
Boise State	7	–	11	.389	13	–	20	.394
Colorado State	7	–	11	.389	12	–	20	.375
Wyoming	4	–	14	.222	8	–	24	.250
San Jose State	1	–	17	.056	4	–	27	.129
† Mountain West Conference tournament winner Rankings from AP Poll

The 2018–19 Colorado State Rams men's basketball team represented Colorado State University during the 2018–19 NCAA Division I men's basketball season. The team was coached by Niko Medved in his first season. The Rams played their home games at Moby Arena on CSU's main campus in Fort Collins, Colorado as members of the Mountain West Conference. They finished the season 12–20, 7–11 in Mountain West play to finish in a three-way tie for seventh place. They lost in the first round of the Mountain West tournament to Boise State.

== Previous season ==
The Rams finished the 2017–18 season 11–21, 4–14 in Mountain West play to finish in tenth place. They lost in the first round of the Mountain West tournament to Utah State.

On February 3, 2018, prior to their game against Nevada, head coach Larry Eustachy was placed on administrative leave amid an internal investigation by Colorado State of Eustachy's conduct with players and other staff members. Eustachy had previously been reprimanded by the university in 2017 for the same type of behavior from a 2014 university led investigation. On February 8, players boycotted practice because of the lack of communication from the athletic department as to the situation. On the same day, it was reported that Eustachy would be fired by the school.

The Rams were initially led by assistant coach Steve Barnes for the first 2 games of Eustachy's absence. However, prior to the team's home game against San Jose State on February 10, he was also placed on administrative leave. Assistant coach Jase Herl took over as interim head coach for the rest of the season.

On February 26, Eustachy officially resigned from Colorado State.

On March 22, Drake head coach and former CSU assistant coach Niko Medved was hired as the new head coach of the Rams.

== Offseason ==
=== Departures ===
Name	Number	Pos.	Height	Weight	Year	Hometown	Reason for departure
Raquan Mitchell	3	G	6'3"	185	RS Sophomore	Homestead, FL	Graduate transferred to New Mexico Highlands
Che Bob	10	G	6'6"	220	Senior	Charlotte, NC	Graduated
Prentiss Nixon	11	G	6'1"	180	Junior	Bolingbrook, IL	Transferred to Iowa State

=== Incoming transfers ===
Name	Number	Pos.	Height	Weight	Year	Hometown	Previous School
Hyron Edwards	0	G	6'0"	170	Junior	East Chicago, IN	Transferred from Texas Tech. Under NCAA transfer rules, Edwards will have to sit out for the 2018–19 season. Will have two years of remaining eligibility.

=== 2018 recruiting class ===
College recruiting information
Name	Hometown	School	Height	Weight	Commit date
Jack Schoemann; SF	Shawnee Mission, KS	Shawnee Mission East High School	6 ft 7 in (2.01 m)	175 lb (79 kg)	
Jack Schoemann; SF	Recruit ratings: Scout: Rivals: ESPN: (0)				
Adam Thistlewood; SF	Golden, CO	Golden High School	6 ft 7 in (2.01 m)	180 lb (82 kg)	Apr 6, 2018
Adam Thistlewood; SF	Recruit ratings: Scout: Rivals: ESPN: (0)				
Jack Schoemann; SF	Shawnee Mission, KS	Shawnee Mission East High School	6 ft 7 in (2.01 m)	175 lb (79 kg)	
Jack Schoemann; SF	Recruit ratings: Scout: Rivals: ESPN: (0)				
Overall recruit ranking: Scout: – Rivals: –
Note: In many cases, Scout, Rivals, 247Sports, On3, and ESPN may conflict in their listings of height and weight.; In these cases, the average was taken. ESPN grades are on a 100-point scale.; Sources: "Colorado State Commit List for 2018". Rivals.; "Men's Basketball Recruiting". Scout.; "ESPN – Colorado State Rams Basketball Recruiting 2018". ESPN.; "Scout.com Team Recruiting Rankings". Scout.; "2018 Team Ranking". Rivals.

== Roster ==
2018–19 Colorado State Rams men's basketball team
Players
Coaches

Pos.	#	Name	Height	Weight	Year	Previous school	Hometown
G	0	Hyron Edwards	6 ft 0 in (1.83 m)	170 lb (77 kg)	RS Jr	East Chicago Central; Texas Tech	East Chicago, IN
F	1	Zo Tyson	6 ft 9 in (2.06 m)	195 lb (88 kg)	RS Jr	Trinity Christian HS; Cape Fear CC	Fayetteville, NC
G	3	Kendle Moore	5 ft 10 in (1.78 m)	—	Fr	Danville HS	Danville, IL
G	12	Juan Sabino II (W)	5 ft 11 in (1.8 m)	170 lb (77 kg)	RS Jr	Fountain-Fort Carson HS	Fountain, CO
G	13	Lorenzo Jenkins	6 ft 7 in (2.01 m)	210 lb (95 kg)	RS Jr	First Baptist Academy; Arkansas	Naples, FL
G	14	Robbie Berwick	6 ft 4 in (1.93 m)	195 lb (88 kg)	RS Sr	Atascadero HS; Florida State	Atascadero, CA
G	15	Anthony Masinton-Bonner	6 ft 2 in (1.88 m)	170 lb (77 kg)	RS Jr	Lawrence HS	Lawrence, KS
F	20	Deion James	6 ft 8 in (2.03 m)	215 lb (98 kg)	Sr	Empire HS; Pime CC	Tucson, AZ
F	21	Logan Ryan	6 ft 9 in (2.06 m)	—	So	International Sports Academy	Plymouth, MI
G	22	J. D. Page	6 ft 3 in (1.91 m)	166 lb (75 kg)	RS Sr	Rangeview HS	Aurora, CO
G	30	Kris Martin	6 ft 6 in (1.98 m)	180 lb (82 kg)	RS Jr	Kimball HS; Oral Roberts	Frisco, TX
F	31	Adam Thistlewood	6 ft 6 in (1.98 m)	195 lb (88 kg)	Fr	Golden HS	Golden, CO
F/C	32	Nico Carvacho	6 ft 10 in (2.08 m)	240 lb (109 kg)	RS Jr	Sunrise Christian Academy	Frisco, TX
F	33	Jack Schoemann	6 ft 7 in (2.01 m)	190 lb (86 kg)	Fr	Shawnee Mission East HS	Prairie Village, KS

Head coach

- Niko Medved (Minnesota)

Assistant coach(es)

- Dave Thorson (Hamline)
- JR Blount (Loyola Chicago)
- Ali Farokhmanesh (Northern Iowa)

Legend

- (C) Team captain
- (S) Suspended
- (I) Ineligible
- (W) Walk-on
- Injured
- Current redshirt

Roster

== Schedule and results ==
Date time, TV	Rank^{#}	Opponent^{#}	Result	Record	Site (attendance) city, state
Exhibition
Nov 2, 2018*; 2:00 pm		CSU–Pueblo	W 87–67		Moby Arena (2,142); Fort Collins, CO
Non-conference regular season
Nov 7, 2018*; 7:00 pm		Colorado Christian; Gulf Coast Showcase	W 100–66	1–0	Moby Arena (2,220); Fort Collins, CO
Nov 10, 2018*; 2:00 pm		Arkansas–Pine Bluff	W 92–67	2–0	Moby Arena (2,208); Fort Collins, CO
Nov 14, 2018*; 7:00 pm		Montana State	W 81–77	3–0	Moby Arena (2,243); Fort Collins, CO
Nov 19, 2018*; 3:00 pm		vs. Louisiana; Gulf Coast Showcase quarterfinals	L 73–91	3–1	Hertz Arena (598); Estero, FL
Nov 20, 2018*; 3:00 pm		vs. Florida Gulf Coast; Gulf Coast Showcase consolation second round	W 82–74	4–1	Hertz Arena (1,245); Estero, FL
Nov 21, 2018*; 12:30 pm		vs. South Dakota State; Gulf Coast Showcase 5th place game	L 65–78	4–2	Hertz Arena; Estero, FL
Nov 27, 2018*; 7:00 pm		Southern Illinois; MW–MVC Challenge	L 67–82	4–3	Moby Arena (2,566); Fort Collins, CO
Dec 1, 2018*; 1:00 pm, P12N		at Colorado	L 80–86	4–4	CU Events Center (7,887); Boulder, CO
Dec 5, 2018*; 8:00 pm, CBSSN		Arkansas	L 74–98	4–5	Moby Arena (3,238); Fort Collins, CO
Dec 8, 2018*; 2:00 pm		Sam Houston State	W 71–65	5–5	Moby Arena (2,298); Fort Collins, CO
Dec 16, 2018*; 2:00 pm		South Dakota	L 63–68	5–6	Moby Arena (2,302); Fort Collins, CO
Dec 22, 2018*; 3:00 pm		at Long Beach State	L 61–64	5–7	Walter Pyramid (1,727); Long Beach, CA
Dec 30, 2018*; 2:00 pm, ATTSNRM		New Mexico State	L 68–88	5–8	Moby Arena (3,218); Fort Collins, CO
Mountain West regular season
Jan 2, 2019; 8:30 pm, CBSSN		at UNLV	L 76–78	5–9 (0–1)	Thomas & Mack Center (7,881); Paradise, NV
Jan 5, 2019; 8:00 pm, ATTSNRM		at Fresno State	L 67–78	5–10 (0–2)	Save Mart Center (5,481); Fresno, CA
Jan 8, 2019; 7:00 pm, ATTSNRM		Air Force	W 87–64	6–10 (1–2)	Moby Arena (2,268); Fort Collins, CO
Jan 12, 2019; 2:00 pm, CBSSN		New Mexico	W 91–76	7–10 (2–2)	Moby Arena (3,057); Fort Collins, CO
Jan 19, 2019; 7:00 pm		at Utah State	L 72–87	7–11 (2–3)	Smith Spectrum (7,509); Logan, UT
Jan 23, 2019; 9:00 pm, CBSSN		at No. 7 Nevada	L 60–100	7–12 (2–4)	Lawlor Events Center (10,931); Reno, NV
Jan 26, 2019; 2:00 pm, ATTSNRM		Fresno State	W 74–65	8–12 (3–4)	Moby Arena (2,877); Fort Collins, CO
Jan 30, 2019; 7:00 pm, ATTSNRM		Boise State	L 68–70	8–13 (3–5)	Moby Arena (2,669); Fort Collins, CO
Feb 2, 2019; 2:00 pm		at Air Force	W 85–53	9–13 (4–5)	Clune Arena (3,215); Colorado Springs, CO
Feb 6, 2019; 8:00 pm, CBSSN		No. 6 Nevada	L 82–98	9–14 (4–6)	Moby Arena (3,765); Fort Collins, CO
Feb 9, 2019; 12:00 pm, ATTSNRM		at Wyoming; Border War	L 66–74	9–15 (4–7)	Arena-Auditorium (5,055); Laramie, WY
Feb 13, 2019; 9:00 pm, ESPN2		San Diego State	L 60–71	9–16 (4–8)	Moby Arena (2,596); Fort Collins, CO
Feb 20, 2019; 8:00 pm		at San Jose State	W 91–70	10–16 (5–8)	Event Center Arena (1,467); San Jose, CA
Feb 23, 2019; 12:00 pm, ATTSNRM		Wyoming; Border War	W 83–48	11–16 (6–8)	Moby Arena (5,026); Fort Collins, CO
Feb 27, 2019; 7:00 pm, Stadium		at Boise State	W 76–62	12–16 (7–8)	Taco Bell Arena (5,151); Boise, ID
Mar 2, 2019; 8:00 pm, ESPNU		at New Mexico	L 65–77	12–17 (7–9)	Dreamstyle Arena (11,207); Albuquerque, NM
Mar 6, 2019; 7:00 pm, ATTSNRM		Utah State	L 96–100 ^{OT}	12–18 (7–10)	Moby Arena (2,548); Fort Collins, CO
Mar 9, 2019; 2:00 pm, ESPN3		UNLV	L 60–65	12–19 (7–11)	Moby Arena (3,505); Fort Collins, CO
Mountain West tournament
Mar 13, 2019; 12:00 pm	(8)	vs. (9) Boise State; First round	L 57–66	12–20	Thomas & Mack Center (5,578); Paradise, NV
*Non-conference game. ^{#}Rankings from AP Poll. (#) Tournament seedings in parentheses. All times are in Mountain Time.
