= 2018–19 Boise State Broncos men's basketball team =

American college basketball season

2018–19 Boise State Broncos men's basketball
- Conference: Mountain West Conference
- Record: 13–20 (7–11 MW)
- Head coach: Leon Rice (9th season)
- Assistant coaches: Chris Acker; Mike Burns; Tim Duryea
- Home arena: Taco Bell Arena

2018–19 Mountain West Conference men's basketball standings
	Conf.				Overall
Team	W		L	PCT	W		L	PCT
No. 20 Nevada	15	–	3	.833	29	–	5	.853
No. 25 Utah State †	15	–	3	.833	28	–	7	.800
Fresno State	13	–	5	.722	23	–	9	.719
San Diego State	11	–	7	.611	21	–	13	.618
UNLV	11	–	7	.611	17	–	14	.548
Air Force	8	–	10	.444	14	–	18	.438
New Mexico	7	–	11	.389	14	–	18	.438
Boise State	7	–	11	.389	13	–	20	.394
Colorado State	7	–	11	.389	12	–	20	.375
Wyoming	4	–	14	.222	8	–	24	.250
San Jose State	1	–	17	.056	4	–	27	.129
† Mountain West Conference tournament winner Rankings from AP Poll

The 2018–19 Boise State Broncos men's basketball team represented Boise State University during the 2018–19 NCAA Division I men's basketball season. The Broncos, led by ninth-year head coach Leon Rice, played their home games at Taco Bell Arena as a member of the Mountain West Conference. They finished the season 13–20, 7–11 in Mountain West play to finish in a three-way tie for seventh place. They defeated Colorado State in the first round of the Mountain West tournament to advance to the quarterfinals where they lost to Nevada. This was the first time in Boise State history that they lost 20 games in a season.

== Previous season ==
The Broncos finished the season 23–9, 13–5 in Mountain West play to finish in second place. They lost in the quarterfinals of the Mountain West tournament to Utah State. They received an invitation to the National Invitation Tournament where they lost in the first round to Washington.

== Offseason ==
=== Departures ===
Name	Number	Pos.	Height	Weight	Year	Hometown	Reason for departure
Chandler Hutchison	15	F	6'7"	197	Senior	Mission Viejo, CA	Graduated / Selected in the 1st round of the 2018 NBA draft (22nd overall) by the Chicago Bulls
Cameron Christon	1	F	6'6"	188	Sophomore	Allen, TX	Transferred midseason
Casdon Jardine	22	G/F	6'7"	218	Sophomore	Twin Falls, ID	Transferred to Utah Valley
Christian Sengfelder	43	F	6'9"	246	Senior	Leverkusen, Germany	Graduated
Matt Serven	4	G	6'4"	166	Freshman	Huntington Beach, CA	Walk-on; didn't return
Lexus Williams	2	G	6'0"	167	RS Senior	Chicago, IL	Graduated

=== Incoming transfers ===
Name	Number	Pos.	Height	Weight	Year	Hometown	Previous college
Patrick Dembley	13	G	6'1"	171	Junior	Minneapolis, MN	Junior college transferred from Iowa Western CC
Rodrick Williams	23	G/F	6'7"	215	Junior	Los Angeles, CA	Junior college transferred from East Los Angeles College

=== 2018 recruiting class ===
College recruiting information
Name	Hometown	School	Height	Weight	Commit date
Michael Frazier; PF	Salt Lake City, UT	East High School	6 ft 9 in (2.06 m)	245 lb (111 kg)	Sep 25, 2017
Michael Frazier; PF	Recruit ratings: Scout: Rivals: (NR)				
Jaycson BeReal; SF	Tulsa, OK	Booker T. Washington High School	6 ft 7 in (2.01 m)	200 lb (91 kg)	Jun 14, 2017
Jaycson BeReal; SF	Recruit ratings: Scout: Rivals: (NR)				
Riley Abercrombie; F	Wollongong, Australia	Clear Lake High School	6 ft 8 in (2.03 m)	205 lb (93 kg)	Sep 29, 2017
Riley Abercrombie; F	Recruit ratings: Scout: Rivals: (NR)				
Overall recruit ranking: Scout: – Rivals: –
Note: In many cases, Scout, Rivals, 247Sports, On3, and ESPN may conflict in their listings of height and weight.; In these cases, the average was taken. ESPN grades are on a 100-point scale.; Sources: "2018 Team Ranking". Rivals.

== Roster ==
2018–19 Boise State Broncos men's basketball team
Players
Coaches

Pos.	#	Name	Height	Weight	Year	Previous school	Hometown
G	0	Marcus Dickinson	6 ft 2 in (1.88 m)	177 lb (80 kg)	Jr	Norman North HS	Norman, OK
G	2	Jaycson Bereal	6 ft 6 in (1.98 m)	188 lb (85 kg)	Fr	Booker T. Washington HS	Tulsa, OK
G	3	Justinian Jessup	6 ft 6 in (1.98 m)	200 lb (91 kg)	Jr	Longmont HS	Longmont, CO
G	4	Bing Huang (W)	6 ft 4 in (1.93 m)	171 lb (78 kg)	Fr	Brewster Academy	Westlake Village, CA
G	5	Malek Harwell	6 ft 5 in (1.96 m)	188 lb (85 kg)	RS Jr	Century HS	Pocatello, ID
F	10	Robin Jorch	6 ft 11 in (2.11 m)	245 lb (111 kg)	Sr	International Berlin Basketball Academy	Berlin, Germany
F	11	Zach Haney	6 ft 11 in (2.11 m)	239 lb (108 kg)	RS Sr	Atascocita HS	Humble, TX
G	12	Max Rice (W)	6 ft 4 in (1.93 m)	198 lb (90 kg)	Fr	Bishop Kelly HS	Boise, ID
G	13	Pat Dembley	6 ft 1 in (1.85 m)	174 lb (79 kg)	Jr	Minneapolis North HS; Iowa Western CC	Minneapolis, MN
G	21	Derrick Alston Jr. (W)	6 ft 8 in (2.03 m)	153 lb (69 kg)	RS So	Strake Jesuit HS	Houston, TX
F	22	Riley Abercrombie	6 ft 8 in (2.03 m)	208 lb (94 kg)	Fr	Clear Lake HS	Wollongong, Australia
G	23	RJ Williams	6 ft 7 in (2.01 m)	209 lb (95 kg)	Jr	Price HS; East Los Angeles College	Los Angeles, CA
F	33	David Wacker	6 ft 10 in (2.08 m)	236 lb (107 kg)	RS Sr	Judson HS	Converse, TX
G	34	Alex Hobbs	6 ft 4 in (1.93 m)	191 lb (87 kg)	Jr	La Porte HS	La Porte, TX
F	45	Mikey Frazier	6 ft 10 in (2.08 m)	244 lb (111 kg)	Fr	East HS	Salt Lake City, UT

Head coach

- Leon Rice (Washington State)

Assistant coach(es)

- Chris Acker (Chaminade)
- Mike Burns (Central Washington)
- Tim Duryea (North Texas)

Legend

- (C) Team captain
- (S) Suspended
- (I) Ineligible
- (W) Walk-on
- Injured
- Current redshirt

Roster

== Schedule and results ==
Date time, TV	Rank^{#}	Opponent^{#}	Result	Record	Site (attendance) city, state
Exhibition
Nov 5, 2018*; 7:00 pm		Vanguard	W 89–63		Taco Bell Arena (2,294); Boise, ID
Non-conference regular season
Nov 10, 2018*; 7:00 pm		Idaho State	L 70–72	0–1	Taco Bell Arena (5,001); Boise, ID
Nov 16, 2018*; 8:00 pm		Jackson State; Cayman Islands Classic on-campus game	W 70–53	1–1	Taco Bell Arena (2,952); Boise, ID
Nov 19, 2018*; 5:30 pm, Stadium		vs. Creighton; Cayman Islands Classic Quarterfinals	L 82–94	1–2	John Gray Gymnasium (1,512); George Town, Cayman Islands
Nov 20, 2018*; 3:00 pm, Stadium		vs. St. Bonaventure; Cayman Islands Classic consolation round	W 72–52	2–2	John Gray Gymnasium (829); George Town, Cayman Islands
Nov 21, 2018*; 12:30 pm, Stadium		vs. Illinois State; Cayman Islands Classic consolation final	L 70–73	2–3	John Gray Gymnasium (525); George Town, Cayman Islands
Nov 27, 2018*; 5:00 pm, ESPN+		at Drake; MW–MVC Challenge	L 74–83	2–4	Knapp Center (2,543); Des Moines, IA
Dec 1, 2018*; 7:00 pm, ESPN3		at Grand Canyon	L 67–69	2–5	GCU Arena (7,317); Phoenix, AZ
Dec 8, 2018*; 2:00 pm		Central Washington	W 82–62	3–5	Taco Bell Arena (3,879); Boise, ID
Dec 12, 2018*; 7:00 pm		Alabama State	W 67–57	4–5	Taco Bell Arena (3,476); Boise, ID
Dec 15, 2018*; 7:00 pm, P12N		at Oregon	L 54–66	4–6	Matthew Knight Arena (8,506); Eugene, OR
Dec 19, 2018*; 8:00 pm		at Loyola Marymount	L 69–70	4–7	Gersten Pavilion (1,279); Los Angeles, CA
Dec 22, 2018*; 1:00 pm		Pacific	W 83–71	5–7	Taco Bell Arena (3,549); Boise, ID
Dec 29, 2018*; 5:30 pm, CBSSN		Oregon	L 50–62	5–8	Taco Bell Arena (7,563); Boise, ID
Mountain West regular season
Jan 2, 2019; 7:00 pm, Stadium		at Wyoming	W 69–55	6–8 (1–0)	Arena-Auditorium (3,395); Laramie, WY
Jan 5, 2019; 8:00 pm, CBSSN		San Diego State	W 88–64	7–8 (2–0)	Taco Bell Arena (5,425); Boise, ID
Jan 12, 2019; 1:00 pm		at San Jose State	W 87–64	8–8 (3–0)	Event Center Arena (1,419); San Jose, CA
Jan 15, 2019; 7:00 pm, CBSSN		No. 10 Nevada	L 71–72	8–9 (3–1)	Taco Bell Arena (8,022); Boise, ID
Jan 19, 2019; 3:30 pm, ATTSNRM		Fresno State	L 53–63	8–10 (3–2)	Taco Bell Arena (6,437); Boise, ID
Jan 22, 2019; 7:00 pm, ATTSNRM		at Air Force	L 60–74	8–11 (3–3)	Clune Arena (1,790); Colorado Springs, CO
Jan 26, 2019; 2:00 pm, Stadium		Wyoming	W 77–52	9–11 (4–3)	Taco Bell Arena (5,093); Boise, ID
Jan 29, 2019; 7:00 pm, ATTSNRM		at Colorado State	W 70–68	10–11 (5–3)	Moby Arena (2,669); Fort Collins, CO
Feb 2, 2019; 4:00 pm, CBSSN		at No. 8 Nevada	L 73–93	10–12 (5–4)	Lawlor Events Center (11,207); Reno, NV
Feb 6, 2019; 9:00 pm, ESPNU		UNLV	L 72–83	10–13 (5–5)	Taco Bell Arena (3,200); Boise, ID
Feb 9, 2019; 12:00 pm		San Jose State	W 105–57	11–13 (6–5)	Taco Bell Arena (3,608); Boise, ID
Feb 13, 2019; 8:30 pm, CBSSN		at Fresno State	L 63–65	11–14 (6–6)	Save Mart Center (5,548); Fresno, CA
Feb 16, 2019; 5:00 pm, CBSSN		at San Diego State	L 65–71	11–15 (6–7)	Viejas Arena (11,040); San Diego, CA
Feb 23, 2019; 2:00 pm, Stadium		Utah State	L 71–78 ^{OT}	11–16 (6–8)	Taco Bell Arena (6,581); Boise, ID
Feb 27, 2019; 7:00 pm, Stadium		Colorado State	L 62–76	11–17 (6–9)	Taco Bell Arena (5,151); Boise, ID
Mar 2, 2019; 8:30 pm, CBSSN		at UNLV	L 81–85 ^{OT}	11–18 (6–10)	Thomas & Mack Center (9,301); Paradise, NV
Mar 6, 2019; 7:00 pm, ESPN3		at New Mexico	L 72–73	11–19 (6–11)	Dreamstyle Arena (10,279); Albuquerque, NM
Mar 9, 2019; 5:00 pm, ATTSNRM		Air Force	W 80–52	12–19 (7–11)	Taco Bell Arena (5,677); Boise, ID
Mountain West tournament
Mar 13, 2019; 12:00 pm, Stadium	(8)	vs. (9) Colorado State; First round	W 80–52	13–19	Thomas & Mack Center (5,578); Paradise, NV
Mar 14, 2019; 1:00 pm, CBSSN	(8)	vs. (1) No. 14 Nevada; Quarterfinals	L 69–77	13–20	Thomas & Mack Center (7,518); Paradise, NV
*Non-conference game. ^{#}Rankings from AP Poll. (#) Tournament seedings in parentheses. All times are in Mountain Time Source.
