= Deshon Taylor =

American basketball player (born 1996)

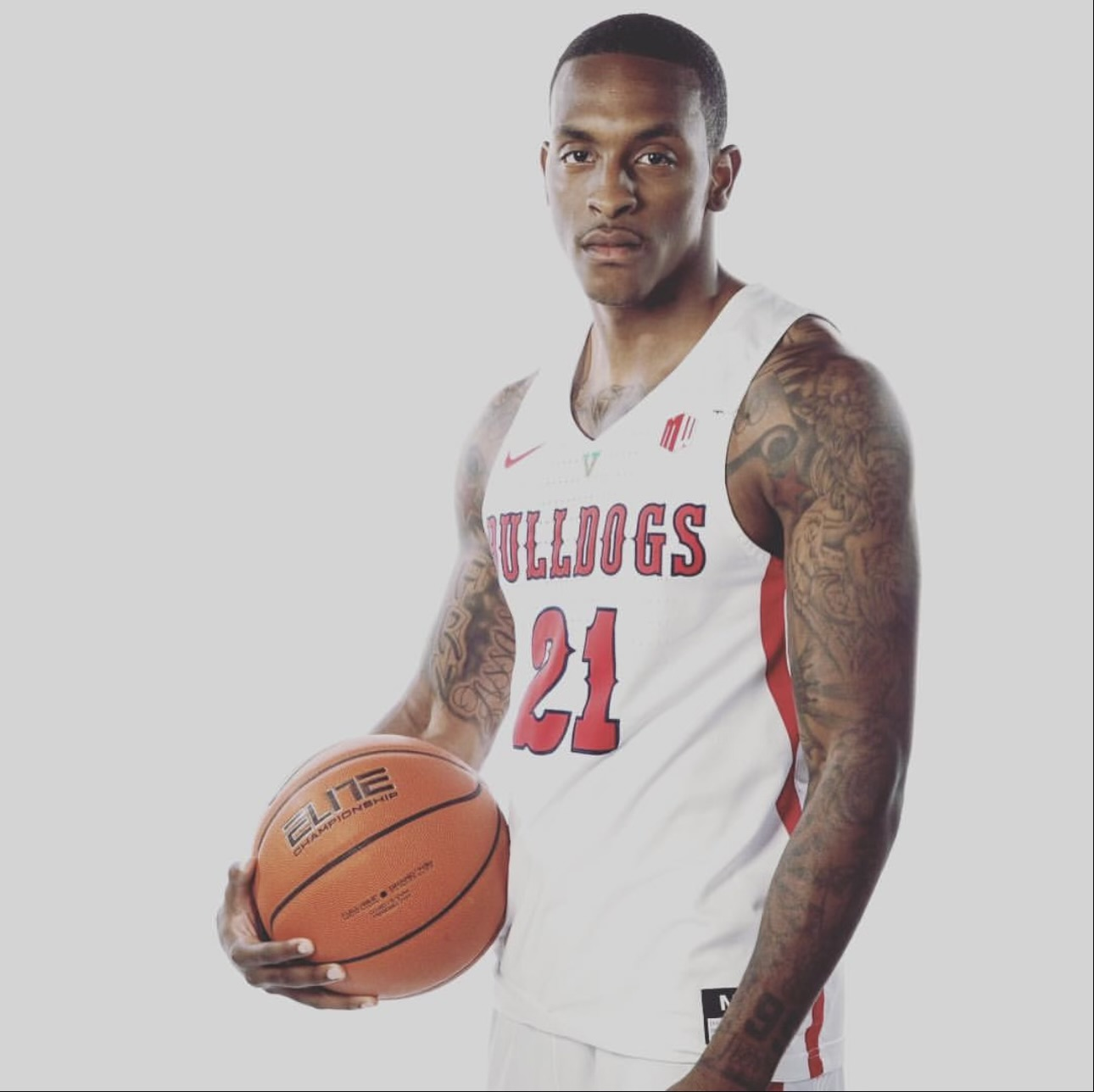

No. 21 – Uni Baskets Münster
- Position: Point guard
- League: ProA

Personal information
- Born: March 17, 1996 (age 30) Los Angeles, California, U.S.
- Listed height: 6 ft 2 in (1.88 m)
- Listed weight: 185 lb (84 kg)

Career information
- High school: John W. North (Riverside, California)
- College: Kansas City (2014–2015); Fresno State (2016–2019)
- NBA draft: 2019: undrafted
- Playing career: 2019–present

Career history
- 2019–2020: Sydney Kings
- 2021: Canterbury Rams
- 2021: Kouvot
- 2021–2022: Atomerőmű SE
- 2022–2023: Kouvot
- 2023–2024: Final Gençlik
- 2024: Hapoel Haifa
- 2024: Cairns Taipans
- 2025: KTP Basket
- 2026: Uni Baskets Münster

Career highlights
- 2× First-team All-Mountain West (2018, 2019); Third-team All-Mountain West (2017); 2× Mountain West All-Defensive Team (2018, 2019)

Deshon Davion Taylor (born March 17, 1996) is an American professional basketball player currently playing with Uni Baskets Münster of the ProA. He played college basketball for the UMKC Kangaroos and Fresno State Bulldogs.

== High school career ==
Taylor was born in Los Angeles, California, to Desha Taylor and Terri Bailey. He played at John W. North High School in Riverside, California, and helped lead his team to four consecutive league titles. As a senior, Taylor averaged 24.2 points, 4.7 rebounds, 2.3 assists and 2.6 steals a game while earning conference MVP, first-team all-state and all-county honors. He was recruited by Hawaii, UC Riverside and Portland State, but committed to play for the UMKC Kangaroos.

== College career ==
=== UMKC ===
As a freshman at the University of Missouri–Kansas City in 2014–15, Taylor started 10 of his 33 games. He averaged 7.6 points, 2.0 rebounds and 1.3 assists a game. At the season's end, he elected to transfer from the program.

=== Fresno State ===
Taylor chose to transfer to Fresno State as a walk-on due to the university being close to home and wanting to reunite with past teammates who were on the roster. Per National Collegiate Athletic Association (NCAA) regulations, Taylor redshirted during the Bulldogs' 2015–16 season.

In his sophomore season and debut season in 2016–17 at Fresno State, Taylor played a sixth man role, starting 15 of his 33 games. He averaged 12.5 points, 2.4 rebounds, 2.1 assists, and 1.2 steals (9th), while leading the Mountain West Conference with a free throw percentage of .879. Taylor was named to the All-Mountain West Third Team.

During his junior season in 2017–18, Taylor was elevated to a permanent starting position. He scored a career-high 32 points against Nevada on January 31, 2018. He averaged team-highs in points (17.8; in the Mountain West Conference (MWC)) and assists (2.6), as well as 3.2 rebounds and 1.5 steals (3rd) a game, with a free throw percentage of .833 (5th). His 200 made free throws were a single season program record. Taylor was named to the All-Mountain West First Team and All-Defense Team. He initially declared for the 2018 NBA draft, but elected to return to Fresno State for his senior season.

Before the start of his final 2018–19 season at Fresno State, Taylor was named to the 2018–19 Mountain West Preseason All-Conference Team. On March 10, 2019, Taylor set a new career high in points with 37 to help win Fresno State's regular season finale against San Jose State. This game, coupled with a 25-point performance in a win against San Diego State, earned Taylor his first MW Player of the Week award on March 11, 2019. In the quarterfinals of the 2019 Mountain West Conference tournament against Air Force, Taylor led his team to a win with 18 points and set a career-high in assists with 10. In his final game for Fresno State, Taylor scored six points in a loss to Utah State in the Mountain West Conference tournament semifinals. Taylor finished the season averaging 17.9 points (5th in the MWC), 3.7 rebounds, 5.0 assists (2nd), and 1.4 steals (3rd) a game, with a free throw percentage of .784 (6th). He ranked in the top 10 in nine of the 13 major individual statistical categories in the Mountain West, which was the most of any player in the conference. Taylor finished his career at Fresno State as the program's seventh all-time leading scorer with 1,482 points.

== Professional career ==
After going undrafted in the 2019 NBA draft, Taylor played for the Philadelphia 76ers during the NBA Summer League. He signed with the Adelaide 36ers of the Australian National Basketball League (NBL) but was released before the start of the regular season after the team decided to re-sign Jerome Randle. Taylor then had a probationary period with Latvian team VEF Rīga where he did not appear in a game but participated in team practices.

On October 31, 2019, Taylor returned to Australia after signing with the Sydney Kings as an injury replacement for Kevin Lisch. Upon Lisch's return, Taylor's stint with the Kings was extended when he was nominated to serve as an injury replacement for Craig Moller. He was removed from the playing roster prior to the start of the playoffs due to the team's return to health but stayed with the Kings while they appeared in the 2020 NBL Finals, where they lost in a shortened finals series to the Perth Wildcats. In 22 games for the Kings, he averaged 6.6 points in 14.9 minutes per game.

On January 12, 2021, Taylor signed with the Canterbury Rams of the New Zealand National Basketball League (NZNBL) for the 2021 season. In 18 games, he averaged 22.9 points, 4.8 rebounds, 4.8 assists, and 2.5 steals per game.

For the 2021–22 season, Taylor joined Kouvot of the Finnish Korisliiga. In 13 games, he averaged 17.0 points, 3.9 rebounds, 3.0 assists and 2.0 steals per game. In December 2021, he joined Atomerőmű SE of the Hungarian Nemzeti Bajnokság I/A. With them, in 23 games he averaged 12.9 points per game.

Taylor re-joined Kouvot for the 2022–23 season. He was named as the league's player of the month in October 2022 as he averaged 27.3 points per game. For the season, in 26 games with the team he averaged a league-leading 25.4 points per game.

On August 9, 2023, Taylor signed with Final Gençlik of the Türkiye Basketbol Ligi (TBL). For the season, he averaged 19.7 points per game.

Taylor began the 2024–25 season with Hapoel Haifa of the Israeli Basketball Premier League. He played in the team's three games in the Winner Cup. On October 30, 2024, he signed with the Cairns Taipans of the Australian NBL as an injury replacement for Pedro Bradshaw. He played three games for the Taipans. On January 17, 2025, Taylor signed with ESSM Le Portel of the LNB Élite; he departed six days later without appearing in a game. On January 26, Taylor signed with KTP Basket in a return to the Korisliiga.

On January 22, 2026, Taylor joined Uni Baskets Münster of the ProA for the remainder of the season.

== Career statistics ==
Legend
GP	Games played	GS	Games started	MPG	Minutes per game
FG%	Field goal percentage	3P%	3-point field goal percentage	FT%	Free throw percentage
RPG	Rebounds per game	APG	Assists per game	SPG	Steals per game
BPG	Blocks per game	PPG	Points per game	**Bold**	Career high

=== College ===
Year	Team	GP	GS	MPG	FG%	3P%	FT%	RPG	APG	SPG	BPG	PPG
2014–15	UMKC	**33**	10	23.2	.408	.394	.803	2.0	1.3	.9	.1	7.6
2016–17	Fresno State	**33**	16	28.2	.443	**.403**	**.879**	2.4	2.1	1.2	.1	12.5
2017–18	Fresno State	32	**30**	33.8	.439	.386	.833	3.2	2.6	**1.5**	**.2**	17.8
2018–19	Fresno State	28	27	**35.6**	**.446**	.401	.784	**3.7**	**5.0**	1.4	**.2**	**17.9**
Career		126	83	29.9	.437	.396	.829	2.8	2.7	1.3	.1	13.7

== Personal life ==
Taylor is a cousin of former NBA player Quincy Pondexter. He has a son.
