= 2018–19 Fresno State Bulldogs men's basketball team =

American college basketball season

2018–19 Fresno State Bulldogs men's basketball
- Conference: Mountain West Conference
- Record: 23–9 (13–5 MW)
- Head coach: Justin Hutson (1st season)
- Assistant coaches: Keith Brown; Tarvish Felton; Tim Shelton
- Home arena: Save Mart Center (Capacity: 15,596)

2018–19 Mountain West Conference men's basketball standings
	Conf.				Overall
Team	W		L	PCT	W		L	PCT
No. 20 Nevada	15	–	3	.833	29	–	5	.853
No. 25 Utah State †	15	–	3	.833	28	–	7	.800
Fresno State	13	–	5	.722	23	–	9	.719
San Diego State	11	–	7	.611	21	–	13	.618
UNLV	11	–	7	.611	17	–	14	.548
Air Force	8	–	10	.444	14	–	18	.438
New Mexico	7	–	11	.389	14	–	18	.438
Boise State	7	–	11	.389	13	–	20	.394
Colorado State	7	–	11	.389	12	–	20	.375
Wyoming	4	–	14	.222	8	–	24	.250
San Jose State	1	–	17	.056	4	–	27	.129
† Mountain West Conference tournament winner Rankings from AP Poll

The 2018–19 Fresno State Bulldogs men's basketball team represented California State University, Fresno in the 2018–19 NCAA Division I men's basketball season. The Bulldogs were led by first-year head coach Justin Hutson and played their home games at the Save Mart Center as members of the Mountain West Conference. They finished the season 23–9, 13–5 in Mountain West play to finish in third place. They defeated Air Force in the quarterfinals of the Mountain West tournament before losing in the semifinals to Utah State. Despite having 23 wins, they did not participate in a postseason tournament.

== Previous season ==
The Bulldogs finished the season 21–11, 11–7 in Mountain West play to finish in a tie for fourth place. They lost in the quarterfinals of the Mountain West Conference tournament to San Diego State. Despite having 21 wins, they did not participate in a postseason tournament.

On March 12, 2018, head coach Rodney Terry left Fresno State to become head coach at UTEP. He finished at Fresno State with a seven-year record of 126–108. On April 5, it was announced that the school had hired San Diego State assistant coach Justin Hutson as head coach.

== Offseason ==
=== Departures ===
Name	Number	Pos.	Height	Weight	Year	Hometown	Reason for departure
Jaron Hopkins	1	G	6'6"	210	RS Senior	Mesa, AZ	Graduated
Jahmel Taylor	5	G	6'0"	175	RS Senior	Los Angeles, CA	Graduated
Bryson Williams	11	F	6'8"	230	Sophomore	Fresno, CA	Transferred to UTEP
Gilles Dekonick	15	F	6'6"	210	Freshman	Diest, Belgium	Walk-on; transferred to UTEP
Ray Bowles Jr.	22	G	6'5"	205	RS Senior	Modesto, CA	Graduated
Terrell Carter II	34	C	6'10"	290	Senior	Los Angeles, CA	Graduated

=== Incoming transfers ===
Name	Number	Pos.	Height	Weight	Year	Hometown	Previous college
Chris Seeley	1	F	6'8"	215	Junior	Fresno, CA	Transferred from Utah. Under NCAA transfer rules, Seeley will have to sit out for the 2018–19 season. Will have two years of remaining eligibility.
Christian Gray	11	F	6'6"	221	Sophomore	San Bernardino, CA	Junior college transferred from Salt Lake CC

=== 2018 recruiting class ===
College recruiting information
Name	Hometown	School	Height	Weight	Commit date
Assane Diouf #43 C	Denver, CO	East High School	6 ft 11 in (2.11 m)	235 lb (107 kg)	Apr 23, 2018
Assane Diouf #43 C	Recruit ratings: Scout: Rivals: 247Sports: ESPN: (78)				
Aguir Agau; SG	Los Angeles, CA	Middlebrooks Academy	6 ft 6 in (1.98 m)	190 lb (86 kg)	May 11, 2018
Aguir Agau; SG	Recruit ratings: Scout: Rivals: 247Sports: ESPN: (NR)				
Overall recruit ranking: Scout: – Rivals: –
Note: In many cases, Scout, Rivals, 247Sports, On3, and ESPN may conflict in their listings of height and weight.; In these cases, the average was taken. ESPN grades are on a 100-point scale.; Sources: "Fresno State Commit List for 2018". Rivals.; "Men's Basketball Recruiting". Scout.; "ESPN – Fresno State Bulldogs Basketball Recruiting 2018". ESPN.; "Scout.com Team Recruiting Rankings". Scout.; "2018 Team Ranking". Rivals.

== Roster ==
2018–19 Fresno State Bulldogs men's basketball team
Players
Coaches

Pos.	#	Name	Height	Weight	Year	Previous school	Hometown
G	0	New Williams	6 ft 2 in (1.88 m)	175 lb (79 kg)	RS So	Auburn	Inglewood, California
F	1	Chris Seeley (redshirt)	6 ft 8 in (2.03 m)	215 lb (98 kg)	Jr	Utah	Fresno, California
G	3	Johnny McWilliams	6 ft 6 in (1.98 m)	200 lb (91 kg)	Jr	San Marcos HS	San Marcos, California
G	4	Braxton Huggins	6 ft 4 in (1.93 m)	195 lb (88 kg)	RS Sr	New Mexico State	Bakersfield, California
G	10	Amrit Dhaliwal	5 ft 11 in (1.8 m)	165 lb (75 kg)	Fr	Central Catholic HS	Modesto, California
F	11	Christian Gray	6 ft 6 in (1.98 m)	240 lb (109 kg)	Jr	Salt Lake CC	Moreno Valley, California
F	12	Myles Fitzgerald-Warren	6 ft 3 in (1.91 m)	180 lb (82 kg)	So	Madison HS	Portland, Oregon
G	13	Aguir Agau	6 ft 7 in (2.01 m)	190 lb (86 kg)	Fr	Cathedral HS	Omaha, Nebraska
G	20	Sam Bittner (W)	6 ft 6 in (1.98 m)	210 lb (95 kg)	Sr	Trinity International HS	Las Vegas, Nevada
G	21	Deshon Taylor	6 ft 2 in (1.88 m)	185 lb (84 kg)	RS Sr	UMKC	Riverside, California
F	32	Nate Grimes	6 ft 8 in (2.03 m)	225 lb (102 kg)	RS Jr	Quality Education HS	Las Vegas, Nevada
C	34	Assane Diouf	7 ft 1 in (2.16 m)	275 lb (125 kg)	Fr	DME Academy	Dakar, Senegal
F/C	35	Lázaro Rojas	6 ft 11 in (2.11 m)	235 lb (107 kg)	RS So	Score Academy HS	São José dos Campos, Brazil
G	55	Noah Blackwell	6 ft 3 in (1.91 m)	190 lb (86 kg)	RS Jr	Long Beach State	Roseville, California

Head coach

- Justin Hutson (Cal State Bakersfield)

Assistant coach(es)

- Keith Brown (Pacific)
- Tarvish Felton (Southern Utah)
- Tim Shelton (San Diego State)

Legend

- (C) Team captain
- (S) Suspended
- (I) Ineligible
- (W) Walk-on
- Injured
- Current redshirt

Roster

== Schedule and results ==
Date time, TV	Rank^{#}	Opponent^{#}	Result	Record	High points	High rebounds	High assists	Site (attendance) city, state
Exhibition
Nov 2, 2018*; 7:00 pm		Humboldt State	W 78–50		15 – Williams	7 – Tied	3 – Gray	Save Mart Center (4,795); Fresno, CA
Non-conference regular season
Nov 6, 2018*; 7:00 pm		Alaska Anchorange	W 91–63	1–0	23 – Huggins	8 – Gray	6 – Taylor	Save Mart Center (4,614); Fresno, CA
Nov 15, 2018*; 6:00 pm, FSSW		at No. 21 TCU	L 69–77	1–1	18 – Huggins	7 – Bittner	8 – Blackwell	Schollmaier Arena (6,315); Fort Worth, TX
Nov 22, 2018*; 1:30 pm, ESPNU		vs. Northwestern; Wooden Legacy quarterfinals	W 78–59	2–1	17 – Huggins	9 – Grimes	5 – Taylor	Titan Gym; Fullerton, CA
Nov 23, 2018*; 11:00 am, ESPN2		vs. Miami (FL); Wooden Legacy semifinals	L 76–78	2–2	28 – Huggins	15 – Grimes	6 – Bittner	Titan Gym; Fullerton, CA
Nov 25, 2018*; 1:00 pm, ESPNU		vs. Hawaii; Wooden Legacy 3rd place game	W 79–64	3–2	20 – Taylor	7 – Grimes	5 – Taylor	Titan Gym; Fullerton, CA
Nov 28, 2018*; 7:00 pm		Pacific	W 81–78 ^{OT}	4–2	22 – Taylor	9 – Rojas	7 – Taylor	Save Mart Center (5,494); Fresno, CA
Dec 1, 2018*; 4:00 pm		Cal Poly	W 76–67	5–2	32 – Taylor	7 – Bittner	6 – Taylor	Save Mart Center (4,724); Fresno, CA
Dec 5, 2018*; 7:00 pm		Weber State	W 71–52	6–2	17 – Huggins	8 – Taylor	5 – Taylor	Save Mart Center (4,597); Fresno, CA
Dec 8, 2018*; 4:00 pm		Long Beach State	W 92–71	7–2	22 – Blackwell	14 – Grimes	6 – Blackwell	Save Mart Center (5,945); Fresno, CA
Dec 19, 2018*; 7:00 pm, Stadium		California	W 95–73	8–2	19 – Williams	7 – Blackwell	9 – Blackwell	Save Mart Center (5,836); Fresno, CA
Dec 22, 2018*; 4:00 pm		UT Martin	W 93–53	9–2	20 – Huggins	7 – Williams	8 – Blackwell	Save Mart Center (4,988); Fresno, CA
Dec 29, 2018*; 4:00 pm		Utah Valley	L 60–64	9–3	19 – Huggins	13 – Grimes	5 – Blackwell	Save Mart Center (5,217); Fresno, CA
Mountain West regular season
Jan 2, 2019; 7:00 pm		at San Jose State	W 73–53	10–3 (1–0)	19 – Grimes	12 – Grimes	6 – Blackwell	Event Center Arena (1,886); San Jose, CA
Jan 5, 2019; 7:00 pm, ATTSNRM		Colorado State	W 78–67	11–3 (2–0)	21 – Taylor	10 – Grimes	7 – Taylor	Save Mart Center (5,481); Fresno, CA
Jan 9, 2019; 6:00 pm		at Utah State	W 78–77	12–3 (3–0)	33 – Huggins	8 – Grimes	6 – Blackwell	Smith Spectrum (6,379); Logan, UT
Jan 12, 2019; 5:00 pm, ESPNU		No. 10 Nevada	L 64–74	12–4 (3–1)	25 – Huggins	11 – Grimes	5 – Blackwell	Save Mart Center (9,586); Fresno, CA
Jan 19, 2019; 2:30 pm, ATTSNRM		at Boise State	W 63–53	13–4 (4–1)	15 – Taylor	8 – Grimes	4 – Taylor	Taco Bell Arena (6,437); Boise, ID
Jan 22, 2019; 8:00 pm, ESPNU		San Diego State	W 66–62	14–4 (5–1)	20 – Huggins	16 – Grimes	5 – Huggins	Save Mart Center (5,792); Fresno, CA
Jan 26, 2019; 1:00 pm, ATTSNRM		at Colorado State	L 65–74	14–5 (5–2)	24 – Taylor	12 – Grimes	7 – Taylor	Moby Arena (2,877); Fort Collins, CO
Jan 30, 2019; 6:00 pm		at Wyoming	W 75–62	15–5 (6–2)	24 – Williams	6 – Bittner	3 – Blackwell	Arena-Auditorium (3,606); Laramie, WY
Feb 2, 2019; 7:00 pm, ESPNU		New Mexico	W 82–70	16–5 (7–2)	22 – Huggins	19 – Grimes	4 – Taylor	Save Mart Center (7,657); Fresno, CA
Feb 5, 2019; 7:30 pm, ATTSNRM		Utah State	L 81–82	16–6 (7–3)	26 – Huggins	6 – Huggins	4 – Blackwell	Save Mart Center (5,091); Fresno, CA
Feb 9, 2019; 2:00 pm, ESPN3		at UNLV	W 83–65	17–6 (8–3)	31 – Huggins	11 – Grimes	3 – Taylor	Thomas & Mack Center (8,324); Paradise, NV
Feb 13, 2019; 7:30 pm, CBSSN		Boise State	W 65–63	18–6 (9–3)	26 – Huggins	15 – Grimes	3 – Huggins	Save Mart Center (5,548); Fresno, CA
Feb 16, 2019; 4:00 p.m., ESPN3		at New Mexico	W 81–73	19–6 (10–3)	26 – Taylor	6 – Bittner	5 – Taylor	Dreamstyle Arena (12,494); Albuquerque, NM
Feb 20, 2019; 7:00 pm, ATTSNRM		Air Force	L 61–64	19–7 (10–4)	23 – Taylor	9 – Grimes	5 – Taylor	Save Mart Center (5,190); Fresno, CA
Feb 23, 2019; 5:00 pm, CBSSN		at No. 6 Nevada	L 68–74	19–8 (10–5)	30 – Taylor	11 – Grimes	8 – Taylor	Lawlor Events Center (11,019); Reno, NV
Feb 27, 2019; 7:00 pm		Wyoming	W 71–60	20–8 (11–5)	30 – Huggins	14 – Grimes	5 – Taylor	Save Mart Center (5,339); Fresno, CA
Mar 6, 2019; 7:00 pm, CBSSN		at San Diego State	W 76–74	21–8 (12–5)	25 – Taylor	7 – Gray	5 – Taylor	Viejas Arena (12,414); San Diego, CA
Mar 9, 2019; 4:00 pm		San Jose State	W 121–81	22–8 (13–5)	37 – Taylor	12 – Grimes	8 – Taylor	Save Mart Center (7,615); Fresno, CA
Mountain West tournament
Mar 14, 2019; 8:30 pm, CBSSN	(3)	vs. (6) Air Force; Quarterfinals	W 76–50	23–8	18 – Taylor	8 – Williams	10 – Taylor	Thomas & Mack Center (7,518); Paradise, NV
Mar 15, 2019; 8:30 pm, CBSSN	(3)	vs. (2) Utah State; Semifinals	L 60–85	23–9	21 – Grimes	6 – Grimes	5 – Taylor	Thomas & Mack Center (8,764); Paradise, NV
*Non-conference game. ^{#}Rankings from AP Poll. (#) Tournament seedings in parentheses. All times are in Pacific Time.
