= 2019 Mountain West Conference men's basketball tournament =

- Classification: Division I
- Season: 2018–19
- Teams: 11
- Site: Thomas & Mack Center; Paradise, Nevada
- Champions: Utah State (1st title)
- Winning coach: Craig Smith (1st title)
- MVP: Sam Merrill (Utah State)
- Attendance: 38,128
- Television: Stadium, CBSSN, CBS

2018–19 Mountain West Conference men's basketball standings
	Conf.				Overall
Team	W		L	PCT	W		L	PCT
No. 20 Nevada	15	–	3	.833	29	–	5	.853
No. 25 Utah State †	15	–	3	.833	28	–	7	.800
Fresno State	13	–	5	.722	23	–	9	.719
San Diego State	11	–	7	.611	21	–	13	.618
UNLV	11	–	7	.611	17	–	14	.548
Air Force	8	–	10	.444	14	–	18	.438
New Mexico	7	–	11	.389	14	–	18	.438
Boise State	7	–	11	.389	13	–	20	.394
Colorado State	7	–	11	.389	12	–	20	.375
Wyoming	4	–	14	.222	8	–	24	.250
San Jose State	1	–	17	.056	4	–	27	.129
† Mountain West Conference tournament winner Rankings from AP Poll

The 2019 Mountain West Conference men's basketball tournament was the postseason men's basketball tournament for the Mountain West Conference. It was held from March 13–16, 2019 at the Thomas & Mack Center on the campus of University of Nevada, Las Vegas, in Las Vegas, Nevada. Utah State defeated San Diego State 64–57 in the championship to earn the Mountain West's automatic bid to the NCAA tournament.

== Seeds ==
All 11 MW schools were eligible to participate in the tournament. Teams were seeded by conference record. Ties were broken by record between the tied teams, followed by record against the regular-season champion, if necessary. As a result, the top five teams (Utah State, Nevada, Fresno State, San Diego State and UNLV) received byes into the tournament quarterfinals. The remaining teams will play in the first round. Tie-breaking procedures will remain unchanged from the 2018 tournament:

- Head-to-head record between the tied teams
- Record against the highest-seeded team not involved in the tie, going down through the seedings as necessary
- Higher RPI:

Seed	School	Conf	Tiebreaker(s)
1	Nevada	15–3	2–0 vs. Fresno State
2	Utah State	15–3	1–1 vs. Fresno State
3	Fresno State	13–5	
4	San Diego State	11–7	2–0 vs. UNLV
5	UNLV	11–7	0–2 vs. San Diego State
6	Air Force	8–10	
7	New Mexico	7–11	2–1 vs. CSU/Boise
8	Boise State	7–11	1–1 vs. CSU, 0–3 vs. Nevada/Utah State
9	Colorado State	7–11	1–1 vs. Boise, 0–4 vs. Nevada/Utah State
10	Wyoming	4–14	
11	San Jose State	1–17	

== Schedule ==
Game	Time	Matchup	Score	Television	Attendance
First round – Wednesday, March 13
1	11:00 am	No. 8 Boise State vs. No. 9 Colorado State	66–57	Stadium	5,578
2	1:30 pm	No. 7 New Mexico vs. No. 10 Wyoming	78–68	Stadium	5,578
3	4:00 pm	No. 6 Air Force vs. No. 11 San Jose State	87–56	Stadium	5,578
Quarterfinals – Thursday, March 14
4	Noon	No. 1 Nevada vs. No. 8 Boise State	77–69	CBSSN	7,309
5	2:30 pm	No. 4 San Diego State vs. No. 5 UNLV	63–55	CBSSN	7,309
6	6:00 pm	No. 2 Utah State vs. No. 7 New Mexico	91–83	CBSSN	7,508
7	8:30 pm	No. 3 Fresno State vs. No. 6 Air Force	76–50	CBSSN	7,508
Semifinals – Friday, March 15
8	6:00 pm	No. 1 Nevada vs. No. 4 San Diego State	56–65	CBSSN	8,764
9	8:30 pm	No. 2 Utah State vs. No. 3 Fresno State	85–60	CBSSN	8,764
Championship – Saturday, March 16
10	3:00 pm	No. 2 Utah State vs. No. 4 San Diego State	64–57	CBS	8,969
Game times in PT. Rankings denote tournament seeding.

== Bracket ==
First round Wednesday, March 13; Stadium
8	Boise State	66
9	Colorado State	57
7	New Mexico	78
10	Wyoming	68
6	Air Force	87
11	San Jose State	56

Quarterfinals; Thursday, March 14; CBSSN
1	Nevada	77
8	Boise State	69
4	San Diego State	63
5	UNLV	55
2	Utah State	91
7	New Mexico	83
3	Fresno State	76
6	Air Force	50

Semifinals; Friday, March 15; CBSSN
1	Nevada	56
4	San Diego State	65
2	Utah State	85
3	Fresno State	60

Championship; Saturday, March 16; CBS
4	San Diego State	57
2	Utah State	64

* denotes overtime period

== See also ==
- 2019 Mountain West Conference women's basketball tournament
