= 2017–18 Cleveland State Vikings men's basketball team =

American college basketball season

2017–18 Cleveland State Vikings men's basketball
- Conference: Horizon League
- Record: 12–23 (6–12 Horizon)
- Head coach: Dennis Felton (1st season)
- Assistant coaches: Lou Dawkins; Bryan Tibaldi; Dražen Zlovarić
- Home arena: Wolstein Center

2017–18 Horizon League men's basketball standings
| | Conf. | | | | Overall |
| Team | W | | L | PCT | W | | L | PCT |
|---|---|---|---|---|---|---|---|---|
| Northern Kentucky | 15 | – | 3 | .833 | 22 | – | 10 | .688 |
| Wright State † | 14 | – | 4 | .778 | 25 | – | 10 | .714 |
| UIC | 12 | – | 6 | .667 | 20 | – | 16 | .556 |
| Oakland | 10 | – | 8 | .556 | 19 | – | 14 | .576 |
| Milwaukee | 8 | – | 10 | .444 | 16 | – | 17 | .485 |
| IUPUI | 8 | – | 10 | .444 | 11 | – | 19 | .367 |
| Green Bay | 7 | – | 11 | .389 | 13 | – | 20 | .394 |
| Cleveland State | 6 | – | 12 | .333 | 12 | – | 23 | .343 |
| Youngstown State | 6 | – | 12 | .333 | 8 | – | 24 | .250 |
| Detroit | 4 | – | 14 | .222 | 8 | – | 24 | .250 |
† 2018 Horizon League Tournament winner

The 2017–18 Cleveland State Vikings men's basketball team represented Cleveland State University in the 2017–18 NCAA Division I men's basketball season. They were coached by first-year head coach Dennis Felton. The Vikings played their home games at the Wolstein Center as members of the Horizon League. They finished the season 12–23, 6–12 in Horizon League play to finish in a tie for eighth place. As the No. 8 seed at the Horizon League tournament, they defeated Youngstown State and upset No. 1 seed Northern Kentucky and No. 4 seed Oakland to advance to the championship game, where they lost to Wright State.

== Previous season ==
The Vikings finished the 2016–17 season 9–22, 5–13 in Horizon League play to finish in ninth place. They lost in the first round of the Horizon League tournament to Youngstown State.

On March 7, 2017, head coach Gary Waters retired. He finished at Cleveland State with an 11-year record of 194–172. On March 24, the school hired former Georgia and Western Kentucky head coach Dennis Felton.

== Offseason ==
=== Departures ===
| Name | Number | Pos. | Height | Weight | Year | Hometown | Reason for departure |
|---|---|---|---|---|---|---|---|
| Gavin Peppers | 2 | G | 6'2" | 190 | Junior | Brookeville, MD | Graduate transferred to Central Michigan |
| Rob Edwards | 3 | G | 6'4" | 200 | Sophomore | Detroit, MI | Transferred to Arizona State |
| Jibri Blount | 5 | F | 6'7" | 220 | Sophomore | Pittsburgh, PA | Transferred to North Carolina Central |
| Nelson Maxwell | 13 | G | 6'0" | 170 | Sophomore | Orange Village, OH | Transferred to Mercyhurst |
| Tim Hasbargen | 21 | G | 6'4" | 200 | Junior | Munich, Germany | Graduate transferred to Babson College |
| Demonte Flannigan | 33 | F | 6'8" | 240 | Senior | Richmond Heights, OH | Graduated |
| P. J. Posey | 35 | C | 6'8" | 275 | Senior | Milwaukee, WI | Graduate transferred to William Jessup |
| Andy Lucien | 41 | F | 6'7" | 190 | Freshman | North Olmsted, OH | Transferred to Walsh |
| Daniel Levitt | 55 | G | 6'1" | 170 | Sophomore | Montreal, QE | Walk-on; left the team for personal reasons |

=== Incoming transfers ===
| Name | Number | Pos. | Height | Weight | Year | Hometown | Previous school |
|---|---|---|---|---|---|---|---|
| Dontel Highsmith | 3 | G | 6'2" | 200 | RS Senior | Dowagiac, MI | Transferred from Northern Illinois. Will eligible to play since Highsmith graduated from Northern Illinois. |
| Al Eichelberger | 24 | F | 6'7" | 251 | Sophomore | Saginaw, MI | Transferred from DePaul. Under NCAA transfer rules, Eichelberger will have to sit out the 2017–18 season. Will have three years of remaining eligibility. |

=== 2017 recruiting class ===
College recruiting information
| Name | Hometown | School | Height | Weight | Commit date |
|---|---|---|---|---|---|
| Shawn Christian; PG | Garfield Heights, OH | Garfield Heights High School | 5 ft 11 in (1.80 m) | 164 lb (74 kg) | |
| Shawn Christian; PG | Recruit ratings: Scout: Rivals: (NR) | | | | |
Overall recruit ranking:
Note: In many cases, Scout, Rivals, 247Sports, On3, and ESPN may conflict in their listings of height and weight.; In these cases, the average was taken. ESPN grades are on a 100-point scale.; Sources: "2017 Team Ranking". Rivals.

== Roster ==
2017–18 Cleveland State Vikings men's basketball team
Players
Coaches

| Pos. | # | Name | Height | Weight | Year | Previous school | Hometown |
|---|---|---|---|---|---|---|---|
| F | 0 | Derek Sloan | 6 ft 6 in (1.98 m) | 225 lb (102 kg) | Sr | Saint Ignatius High School | Moreland Hills, Ohio |
| G | 1 | Kasheem Thomas | 6 ft 0 in (1.83 m) | 165 lb (75 kg) | So | Champlain College Saint-Lambert | Châteauguay, Quebec, Canada |
| G/F | 2 | Anthony Wright | 6 ft 7 in (2.01 m) | 200 lb (91 kg) | Sr | Harcum College | Harrisburg, Pennsylvania |
| G | 3 | Dontel Highsmith | 6 ft 2 in (1.88 m) | 200 lb (91 kg) | RS Sr | Northern Illinois | Dowagiac, Michigan |
| G | 4 | Kenny Carpenter | 6 ft 5 in (1.96 m) | 180 lb (82 kg) | Sr | Cass Technical High School | Detroit, Michigan |
| G | 5 | Tyree Appleby | 6 ft 1 in (1.85 m) | 165 lb (75 kg) | Fr | Jacksonville High School | Jacksonville, Arkansas |
| G | 12 | Shawn Christian Jr. | 6 ft 0 in (1.83 m) | 175 lb (79 kg) | Fr | Garfield Heights High School | Garfield Heights, Ohio |
| F | 13 | Stefan Kenić | 6 ft 9 in (2.06 m) | 220 lb (100 kg) | Fr | KK Smederevo | Belgrade, Serbia |
| G | 15 | Deven Stover | 6 ft 5 in (1.96 m) | 210 lb (95 kg) | Fr | Saint Ignatius High School | Solon, Ohio |
| G | 20 | Bobby Word | 6 ft 4 in (1.93 m) | 180 lb (82 kg) | RS Sr | Oral Roberts | Lancaster, Texas |
| F | 22 | Evan Clayborne | 6 ft 8 in (2.03 m) | 240 lb (109 kg) | So | Thurgood Marshall High School | Dayton, Ohio |
| F | 23 | Jamarcus Hairston | 6 ft 8 in (2.03 m) | 230 lb (104 kg) | Sr | Louisburg College | Danville, Georgia |
| F | 24 | Al Eichelberger (redshirt) | 6 ft 7 in (2.01 m) | 251 lb (114 kg) | So | DePaul | Saginaw, Michigan |
| F | 25 | David Payne (W) | 6 ft 5 in (1.96 m) | 205 lb (93 kg) | Jr | Malcolm X | Chicago, Illinois |

Head coach

- Dennis Felton (Howard)

Assistant coach(es)

- Lou Dawkins (Tulsa)
- Bryan Tibaldi (Michigan State)
- Dražen Zlovarić (Chattanooga)

Legend

- (C) Team captain
- (S) Suspended
- (I) Ineligible
- (W) Walk-on
- Injured
- Current redshirt

Roster

== Schedule and results ==
| Date time, TV | Rank^{#} | Opponent^{#} | Result | Record | Site (attendance) city, state |
Exhibition
| Nov 2, 2017*; 7:00 pm | | Cedarville | W 78–60 | | Wolstein Center; Cleveland, OH |
Non-Conference regular season
| Nov 11, 2017*; 7:00 pm, ESPN3 | | at Akron; Northeast Ohio Coaches vs Cancer Doubleheader | L 57–67 | 0–1 | James A. Rhodes Arena (4,036); Akron, OH |
| Nov 14, 2017*; 7:00 pm, BTN | | at Rutgers; Showcase on the Banks | L 38–70 | 0–2 | Louis Brown Athletic Center (3,292); Piscataway, NJ |
| Nov 17, 2017*; 7:00 pm, ESPN3 | | Coppin State; Showcase on the Banks | W 80–56 | 1–2 | Wolstein Center (1,931); Cleveland, OH |
| Nov 20, 2017*; 7:00 pm, ESPN3 | | at East Carolina; Showcase on the Banks | L 69–72 | 1–3 | Williams Arena (2,907); Greenville, NC |
| Nov 24, 2017*; 5:00 pm, ESPN3 | | Central Connecticut; Showcase on the Banks | L 73–74 | 1–4 | Wolstein Center (1,121); Cleveland, OH |
| Nov 29, 2017*; 7:00 pm, ESPN3 | | Arkansas State | W 75–72 | 2–4 | Wolstein Center (1,175); Cleveland, OH |
| Dec 2, 2017*; 7:00 pm, ESPN3 | | at Kent State | L 62–72 | 2–5 | MAC Center (2,511); Toledo, OH |
| Dec 6, 2017*; 7:00 pm, ESPN3 | | at Western Michigan | L 67–78 | 2–6 | University Arena (1,923); Kalamazoo, MI |
| Dec 10, 2017*; 2:00 pm, ESPN3 | | Notre Dame (OH) | W 89–56 | 3–6 | Wolstein Center (1,033); Cleveland, OH |
| Dec 19, 2017*; 7:00 pm | | at Niagara | L 77–79 | 3–7 | Gallagher Center (934); Lewiston, NY |
| Dec 21, 2017*; 7:00 pm, ESPN3 | | at No. 20 Cincinnati | L 62–81 | 3–8 | BB&T Arena (7,988); Highland Heights, KY |
| Dec 23, 2017*; 2:00 pm, ESPN3 | | Toledo | L 62–77 | 3–9 | Wolstein Center (1,597); Cleveland, OH |
| Dec 29, 2017*; 6:00 pm, BTN | | at No. 2 Michigan State | L 61–111 | 3–10 | Breslin Center (14,797); East Lansing, MI |
Horizon League regular season
| Jan 1, 2018; 1:00 pm, ESPN3 | | Youngstown State | L 77–80 | 3–11 (0–1) | Wolstein Center (1,221); Cleveland, OH |
| Jan 4, 2018; 7:00 pm, ESPN3 | | Green Bay | W 80–79 | 4–11 (1–1) | Wolstein Center (1,095); Cleveland, OH |
| Jan 6, 2018; 3:30 pm, ESPN3 | | Milwaukee | L 63–67 | 4–12 (1–2) | Wolstein Center (1,027); Cleveland, OH |
| Jan 10, 2018; 7:00 pm, ESPN3 | | at Detroit | L 84–85 | 4–13 (1–3) | Calihan Hall (1,027); Detroit, MI |
| Jan 12, 2018; 7:00 pm, ESPN3 | | at Oakland | L 68–81 | 4–14 (1–4) | Athletics Center O'rena (3,156); Rochester, MI |
| Jan 15, 2018; 7:30 pm, ESPN3 | | at Northern Kentucky | L 55–70 | 4–15 (1–5) | BB&T Arena (3,812); Highland Heights, KY |
| Jan 18, 2018; 7:00 pm, ESPN3 | | IUPUI | W 70–67 | 5–15 (2–5) | Wolstein Center (1,125); Cleveland, OH |
| Jan 20, 2018; 3:30 pm, ESPN3 | | UIC | L 80–87 | 5–16 (2–6) | Wolstein Center (1,531); Cleveland, OH |
| Jan 25, 2018; 8:00 pm, ESPN3 | | at Green Bay | L 44–66 | 5–17 (2–7) | Resch Center (2,325); Green Bay, WI |
| Jan 27, 2018; 2:00 pm, ESPN3 | | at Milwaukee | L 47–70 | 5–18 (2–8) | UW–Milwaukee Panther Arena (1,865); Milwaukee, WI |
| Feb 1, 2018; 7:00 pm, ESPN3 | | Wright State | W 77–74 | 6–18 (3–8) | Wolstein Center (1,411); Cleveland, OH |
| Feb 3, 2018; 3:00 pm, ESPN3 | | Northern Kentucky | L 61–78 | 6–19 (3–9) | Wolstein Center (1,853); Cleveland, OH |
| Feb 8, 2018; 7:00 pm, ESPN3 | | at IUPUI | L 73–78 | 6–20 (3–10) | Indiana Farmers Coliseum (910); Indianapolis, IN |
| Feb 10, 2018; 8:00 pm, ESPN3 | | at UIC | W 86–78 | 7–20 (4–10) | UIC Pavilion (1,185); Chicago, IL |
| Feb 14, 2018; 7:00 pm, ESPN3 | | Detroit | L 72–75 | 8–20 (5–10) | Wolstein Center (1,101); Cleveland, OH |
| Feb 16, 2018; 7:00 pm, ESPN3 | | Oakland | L 66–82 | 8–21 (5–11) | Wolstein Center (1,725); Cleveland, OH |
| Feb 19, 2018; 7:30 pm, ESPN3 | | at Wright State | L 63–72 | 8–22 (5–12) | Nutter Center (3,745); Fairborn, OH |
| Feb 24, 2018; 7:00 pm, ESPN3 | | at Youngstown State | W 99–94 ^{2OT} | 9–22 (6–12) | Beeghly Center (5,483); Youngstown, OH |
Horizon League tournament
| Mar 2, 2018; 8:00 pm, ESPN3 | (8) | vs. (9) Youngstown State; First round | W 72–71 | 10–22 | Little Caesars Arena (4,248); Detroit, MI |
| Mar 3, 2018; 8:00 pm, ESPN3 | (8) | vs. (1) Northern Kentucky; Quarterfinal | W 89–80 | 11–22 | Little Caesars Arena (6,276); Detroit, MI |
| Mar 5, 2018; 7:00 pm, ESPNU | (8) | vs. (4) Oakland; Semifinal | W 44–43 | 12–22 | Little Caesars Arena (5,398); Detroit, MI |
| Mar 6, 2018; 7:00 pm, ESPN | (8) | vs. (2) Wright State; Championship game | L 57–74 | 12–23 | Little Caesars Arena (7,595); Detroit, MI |
*Non-conference game. ^{#}Rankings from ESPN/USA Today Coaches Poll. (#) Tournament seedings in parentheses. All times are in Eastern Time.

- Source
