= 2017–18 UIC Flames men's basketball team =

American college basketball season

2017–18 UIC Flames men's basketball

CIT, runner-up
- Conference: Horizon League
- Record: 20–16 (12–6 Horizon)
- Head coach: Steve McClain (3rd season)
- Assistant coaches: Seth Cooper; Tony Harvey; Dee Brown
- Home arena: UIC Pavilion

2017–18 Horizon League men's basketball standings
	Conf.				Overall
Team	W		L	PCT	W		L	PCT
Northern Kentucky	15	–	3	.833	22	–	10	.688
Wright State †	14	–	4	.778	25	–	10	.714
UIC	12	–	6	.667	20	–	16	.556
Oakland	10	–	8	.556	19	–	14	.576
Milwaukee	8	–	10	.444	16	–	17	.485
IUPUI	8	–	10	.444	11	–	19	.367
Green Bay	7	–	11	.389	13	–	20	.394
Cleveland State	6	–	12	.333	12	–	23	.343
Youngstown State	6	–	12	.333	8	–	24	.250
Detroit	4	–	14	.222	8	–	24	.250
† 2018 Horizon League Tournament winner

The 2017–18 UIC Flames men's basketball team represented the University of Illinois at Chicago in the 2017–18 NCAA Division I men's basketball season. The Flames, led by third-year head coach Steve McClain, played their home games at the UIC Pavilion as members of the Horizon League. They finished the season 20–16, 12–6 in Horizon League play, to finish in third place. They lost in the quarterfinals of the Horizon League tournament to Milwaukee. They were invited to the CollegeInsider.com Tournament where they defeated Saint Francis (PA), Austin Peay and Liberty to advance to the championship game where they lost to Northern Colorado.

== Previous season ==
The Flames finished the 2016–17 season 17–19, 7–11 in Horizon League play, to finish in sixth place. They defeated Green Bay in the quarterfinals of the Horizon League tournament before losing to Milwaukee in the semifinals. They were invited to the College Basketball Invitational where they defeated Stony Brook and George Washington before losing in the semifinals to Coastal Carolina.

== Departures ==
Name	Number	Pos.	Height	Weight	Year	Hometown	Reason for departure
Michael Kolawole	1	G	6'5"	195	Sophomore	Rowlett, TX	Transferred to Lamar
K. J. Santos	2	F	6'8"	200	Freshman	Geneva, IL	Transferred to Tallahassee CC
Hassan Thomas	3	F	6'7"	210	Sophomore	Dallas, TX	Graduate transferred to Emporia State
Lance Whitaker	4	G/F	6'4"	210	RS Junior	Bartlett, IL	Left the team for personal reasons
Kyle Guice	22	F/C	6'8"	225	Junior	Coeur d'Alene, ID	Left the team for personal reasons
Josh Joiner	25	G	6'1"	170	Senior	Chicago, IL	Walk-on; graduated

=== Incoming transfers ===
Name	Number	Pos.	Height	Weight	Year	Hometown	Previous school
Naradain James	22	F	6'7"	205	Junior	Mansfield, OH	Junior college transferred from Garden City CC

== Recruiting class of 2017 ==
College recruiting
Name	Hometown	School	Height	Weight	Commit date
Ralph Bissainthe; SG	Hollywood, FL	MacArthur High School	6 ft 6 in (1.98 m)	190 lb (86 kg)	May 26, 2017
Ralph Bissainthe; SG	Recruit ratings: Scout: Rivals: (NR)				
Jacob Wiley; PF	Houston, TX	Sam Houston High School	6 ft 4 in (1.93 m)	N/A	
Jacob Wiley; PF	Recruit ratings: Scout: Rivals: (NR)				
Michael Diggins; SF	Las Vegas, NV	Durango High School	6 ft 8 in (2.03 m)	185 lb (84 kg)	
Michael Diggins; SF	Recruit ratings: Scout: Rivals: (NR)				
Overall recruit ranking:
Note: In many cases, Scout, Rivals, 247Sports, On3, and ESPN may conflict in their listings of height and weight.; In these cases, the average was taken. ESPN grades are on a 100-point scale.; Sources: "2017 Team Ranking". Rivals.

== Roster ==
2017–18 UIC Flames men's basketball team
Players
Coaches

Pos.	#	Name	Height	Weight	Year	Previous school	Hometown
G	0	Dominique Matthews	6 ft 2 in (1.88 m)	200 lb (91 kg)	RS So	St. Rita of Cascia High School	Chicago, IL
G	1	Marcus Ottey	6 ft 2 in (1.88 m)	185 lb (84 kg)	So	SPIRE Academy	Ajax, ON
F	2	Michael Diggins	6 ft 8 in (2.03 m)	185 lb (84 kg)	Fr	Durango High School	Las Vegas, NV
F	3	Jacob Wiley	6 ft 7 in (2.01 m)	200 lb (91 kg)	Fr	Sam Houston Math, Science, and Technology Center	Houston, TX
G/F	4	Tarkus Ferguson	6 ft 4 in (1.93 m)	190 lb (86 kg)	So	Althoff Catholic High School	Belleville, IL
G	5	Ralph Bissainthe	6 ft 6 in (1.98 m)	200 lb (91 kg)	Fr	McArthur High School	North Miami, FL
F	10	Dikembe Dixson	6 ft 7 in (2.01 m)	200 lb (91 kg)	RS So	Mingo Central Comprehensive High School	Matewan, WV
F	13	Jordan Blount	6 ft 8 in (2.03 m)	220 lb (100 kg)	So	SPIRE Academy	Cork, Ireland
G	15	Godwin Boahen	5 ft 11 in (1.8 m)	175 lb (79 kg)	So	The Hill Academy	Toronto, ON
F/C	21	Tai Odiase	6 ft 9 in (2.06 m)	240 lb (109 kg)	Sr	Homewood-Flossmoor High School	Glenwood, IL
F	22	Naradain James	6 ft 7 in (2.01 m)	205 lb (93 kg)	Jr	Mansfield Senior High School; Garden City Community College	Kalamazoo, MI
F/C	32	Clint Robinson	6 ft 8 in (2.03 m)	235 lb (107 kg)	Sr	Charles Herbert Flowers High School; State Fair Community College	Montego Bay, Jamaica

Head coach

- Steve McClain (Chadron State)

Assistant coach(es)

- Seth Cooper (Edgewood)
- Tony Harvey (Cameron)
- Dee Brown (Illinois)

Legend

- (C) Team captain
- (S) Suspended
- (I) Ineligible
- (W) Walk-on
- Injured
- Current redshirt

Roster
Last update: August 20, 2024

== Schedule and results ==
Date time, TV	Rank^{#}	Opponent^{#}	Result	Record	High points	High rebounds	High assists	Site (attendance) city, state
Exhibition
October 25, 2017*; 6:30 p.m.		St. Francis (IL)	W 97–62		21 – Odiase	7 – Robinson	13 – Ferguson	UIC Pavilion; Chicago, IL
November 22, 2017*; 7:00 p.m., ESPN3		Olivet Nazarene; Exhibition	W 107–83		23 – Ottey	7 – Blount	13 – Ferguson	UIC Pavilion (542); Chicago, IL
Non-conference season
November 10, 2017*; 7:00 p.m., ESPN3		North Carolina Central	W 65–55	1–0	15 – Boahen	8 – Odiase	5 – Blount	UIC Pavilion (2,788); Chicago, IL
November 13, 2017*; 7:00 p.m., NBCSC		Saint Joseph's	L 82–86 ^{OT}	1–1	23 – Dixson	9 – Odiase	7 – Ferguson	UIC Pavilion (3,175); Chicago, IL
November 16, 2017*; 7:00 p.m., ESPN3		Delaware State; Adolph Rupp Classic	L 55–95	2–1	16 – Dixson	7 – Blount	5 – tied	UIC Pavilion (1,537); Chicago, IL
November 18, 2017*; 3:00 p.m., ESPN3		Fort Wayne; Adolph Rupp Classic	L 51–67	2–2	12 – Ottey	10 – Odiase	3 – Boahen	UIC Pavilion (1,947); Chicago, IL
November 26, 2017*; 5:00 p.m., SECN		at No. 8 Kentucky; Adolph Rupp Classic	L 73–107	2–3	17 – Boahen	8 – Odiase	2 – Ferguson	Rupp Arena (20,212); Lexington, KY
November 29, 2017*; 7:00 p.m., ESPN3		at Troy; Adolph Rupp Classic	L 66–87	2–4	14 – Matthews	7 – Boahen	4 – Ottey	Trojan Arena (1,093); Troy, AL
December 2, 2017*; 3:00 p.m., ESPN3		at Loyola–Chicago	L 61–85	2–5	16 – Ottey	6 – Robinson	2 – tied	Joseph J. Gentile Arena (3,024); Chicago, IL
December 6, 2017*; 7:00 p.m., ESPN3		Wisconsin–Parkside	W 76–48	3–5	17 – Dixson	9 – tied	4 – Boahen	UIC Pavilion (1,323); Chicago, IL
December 9, 2017*; 3:00 p.m., NBCSC		DePaul	L 55–65	3–6	13 – Matthews	8 – Blount	2 – tied	UIC Pavilion (3,229); Chicago, IL
December 15, 2017*; 7:00 p.m., ESPN3		Dartmouth	W 76–60	4–6	19 – Dixson	7 – Boahen	10 – Blount	UIC Pavilion (1,275); Chicago, IL
December 19, 2017*; 7:00 p.m., NBCSC		at Illinois State	L 70–71	4–7	23 – Ottey	11 – Blount	4 – Blount	Redbird Arena (4,062); Normal, IL
December 21, 2017*; 7:00 p.m., ESPN3		at Northern Illinois	L 63–69	4–8	17 – tied	10 – Blount	4 – Blount	Convocation Center (889); DeKalb, IL
December 23, 2017*; 3:00 p.m., ESPN3		Trinity Christian	W 84–45	5–8	25 – Dixson	8 – Robinson	4 – Blount	UIC Pavilion (764); Chicago, IL
Horizon League regular season
December 28, 2017; 6:00 p.m., ESPN3		at Wright State	L 61–65	5–9 (0–1)	16 – Ottey	7 – tied	3 – Ottey	Nutter Center (3,397); Fairborn, OH
December 30, 2017; 6:00 p.m., ESPN3		at Northern Kentucky	L 51–86	5–10 (0–2)	15 – Ottey	8 – Blount	2 – Boahen	BB&T Arena (3,688); Highland Heights, KY
January 4, 2018; 6:00 p.m., ESPN3		at IUPUI	W 70–65	6–10 (1–2)	19 – tied	7 – Blount	4 – Blount	Indiana Farmers Coliseum (815); Indianapolis, IN
January 10, 2018; 7:00 p.m., ESPN3		Green Bay	W 84–73	7–10 (2–2)	23 – Dixson	7 – Blount	12 – Ferguson	UIC Pavilion (1,595); Chicago, IL
January 12, 2018; 7:00 p.m., ESPN3		Milwaukee	W 88–73	8–10 (3–2)	22 – Dixson	7 – Ferguson	9 – Ferguson	UIC Pavilion (1,643); Chicago, IL
January 15, 2018; 7:00 p.m., NBCSC		Oakland	L 68–78	8–11 (3–3)	13 – Dixson	9 – Blount	6 – Ferguson	UIC Pavilion (2,080); Chicago, IL
January 18, 2018; 6:00 p.m., ESPN3		at Youngstown State	W 92–78	9–11 (4–3)	28 – Ottey	8 – Blount	10 – Ferguson	Beeghly Center (1,686); Youngstown, OH
January 20, 2018; 2:30 p.m., ESPN3		at Cleveland State	W 87–80	10–11 (5–3)	18 – Boahen	11 – Blount	3 – Matthews	Wolstein Center (1,531); Cleveland, OH
January 27, 2018; 3:00 p.m., NBCSC		IUPUI	W 71–62	11–11 (6–3)	18 – Ottey	14 – Blount	7 – Blount	UIC Pavilion (3,373); Chicago, IL
January 29, 2018; 7:00 p.m., ESPN3		at Milwaukee	W 74–56	12–11 (7–3)	19 – Ferguson	10 – Blount	5 – Ferguson	UW–Milwaukee Panther Arena (1,057); Milwaukee, WI
February 2, 2018; 8:00 p.m., ESPNU		at Oakland	W 79–73	13–11 (8–3)	19 – Odiase	10 – Robinson	7 – Ferguson	Athletics Center O'rena (3,182); Rochester, MI
February 4, 2018; 1:00 p.m., ESPN3		at Detroit	W 78–69	14–11 (9–3)	23 – Dixson	11 – Ferguson	3 – tied	Calihan Hall (1,113); Detroit, MI
February 8, 2018; 7:00 p.m., NBCSC		Youngstown State	W 100–75	15–11 (10–3)	22 – Dixson	8 – Ferguson	10 – Ferguson	UIC Pavilion (2,033); Chicago, IL
February 10, 2018; 7:00 p.m., ESPN3		Cleveland State	L 78–86	15–12 (10–4)	14 – Ottey	7 – Odiase	5 – Ferguson	UIC Pavilion (1,185); Chicago, IL
February 16, 2018; 8:00 p.m., ESPN3		at Green Bay	W 83–75	16–12 (11–4)	18 – Dixson	15 – Blount	4 – Ferguson	Kress Events Center (3,872); Green Bay, WI
February 19, 2018; 7:00 p.m., ESPN3		Detroit	W 94–87	17–12 (12–4)	20 – tied	10 – Blount	5 – Ferguson	UIC Pavilion (1,206); Chicago, IL
February 23, 2018; 7:00 p.m., ESPN3		Northern Kentucky	L 72–79	17–13 (12–5)	14 – Odiase	9 – Odiase	5 – Ferguson	UIC Pavilion (3,168); Chicago, IL
February 25, 2018; 5:00 p.m., NBCSC		Wright State	L 81–88	17–14 (12–6)	19 – Dixson	8 – Ferguson	8 – Ferguson	UIC Pavilion (3,091); Chicago, IL
Horizon League tournament
March 4, 2018; 5:00 p.m., ESPN3	(3)	vs. (6) Milwaukee; Quarterfinals	L 75–80	17–15	23 – Ferguson	7 – Blount	7 – Ferguson	Little Caesars Arena (6,771); Detroit, MI
CIT
March 14, 2018*; 7:00 p.m.		Saint Francis (PA); First round	W 84–61	18–15	15 – Robinson	10 – Ferguson	9 – Boahen	UIC Pavilion (1,137); Chicago, IL
March 21, 2018*; 7:00 p.m.		at Austin Peay; Quarterfinals	W 83–81	19–15	21 – Ferguson	9 – Ferguson	4 – Ferguson	Dunn Center (1,121); Clarksville, TN
March 28, 2018*; 6:00 p.m., CBSSN		at Liberty; Semifinals	W 67–51	20–15	16 – Ferguson	9 – Robinson	3 – Ottey	Vines Center (2,248); Lynchburg, VA
March 30, 2018*; 6:00 p.m., CBSSN		at Northern Colorado; Championship	L 71–76	20–16	25 – Ottey	10 – Ferguson	3 – Ferguson	Bank of Colorado Arena (3,198); Greeley, CO
*Non-conference game. ^{#}Rankings from AP poll. (#) Tournament seedings in parentheses. All times are in Central.
