= 2017–18 Detroit Titans men's basketball team =

American college basketball season

2017–18 Detroit Titans men's basketball
- Conference: Horizon League
- Record: 8–24 (4–14 Horizon)
- Head coach: Bacari Alexander (2nd season)
- Assistant coaches: Jermaine Jackson; Canaan Chatman; Pete Kahler
- Home arena: Calihan Hall

2017–18 Horizon League men's basketball standings
	Conf.				Overall
Team	W		L	PCT	W		L	PCT
Northern Kentucky	15	–	3	.833	22	–	10	.688
Wright State †	14	–	4	.778	25	–	10	.714
UIC	12	–	6	.667	20	–	16	.556
Oakland	10	–	8	.556	19	–	14	.576
Milwaukee	8	–	10	.444	16	–	17	.485
IUPUI	8	–	10	.444	11	–	19	.367
Green Bay	7	–	11	.389	13	–	20	.394
Cleveland State	6	–	12	.333	12	–	23	.343
Youngstown State	6	–	12	.333	8	–	24	.250
Detroit	4	–	14	.222	8	–	24	.250
† 2018 Horizon League Tournament winner

The 2017–18 Detroit Titans men's basketball team, also known as Detroit Mercy, represented the University of Detroit Mercy during the 2017–18 NCAA Division I men's basketball season. The Titans, led by second-year head coach Bacari Alexander, played their home games at Calihan Hall as members of the Horizon League. They finished the season 8–24, 4–14 in Horizon League play to finish in last place. They lost in the first round of the Horizon League tournament to Green Bay.

On March 26, 2018, the school fired head coach Bacari Alexander after two seasons. On June 5, the school hired Texas Southern head coach Mike Davis as the Titans' new coach.

== Previous season ==
The Titans finished the season 8–23, 6–12 in Horizon League play to finish in seventh place. As the No. 7 seed in the Horizon League tournament, they lost Milwaukee in the first round.

== Departures ==
Name	Number	Pos.	Height	Weight	Year	Hometown	Reason for departure
Chris Jenkins	0	G/F	6'8"	200	RS Senior	Detroit, MI	Graduated
Patrick Robinson Jr.	2	G	5'11"	170	Senior	Brampton, ON	Graduated
Matthew Grant	5	G	6'0"	177	Senior	Los Angeles, CA	Graduated
Jarod Williams	11	G	6'3"	220	Senior	Danville, VA	Graduated
Aaron Foster-Smith	15	F	6'7"	236	Sophomore	Taylor, MI	Transferred

=== Incoming transfers ===
Name	Number	Pos.	Height	Weight	Year	Hometown	Previous School
Roschon Price	2	F	6'6"	235	RS Senior	Long Beach, CA	Transferred from Long Beach State. Will eligible to play since Price graduated from Long Beach State.
Tariiq Jones	10	F	6'7"	200	Junior	Detroit, MI	Junior college transferred from Schoolcraft College
Musiol Gjysma	55	F	6’7	235	Junior	Sterling Heights, Michigan	Transferred From Rochester College

== Recruiting class of 2017 ==
College recruiting
Name	Hometown	School	Height	Weight	Commit date
Jermaine Jackson, Jr. PG	Detroit, MI	Dakota High School	5 ft 10 in (1.78 m)	160 lb (73 kg)	Jul 20, 2013
Jermaine Jackson, Jr. PG	Recruit ratings: Scout: Rivals: (NR)				
Jack Ballantyne; PF	Warren, MI	Dakota High School	6 ft 9 in (2.06 m)	250 lb (110 kg)	Oct 1, 2016
Jack Ballantyne; PF	Recruit ratings: Scout: Rivals: (NR)				
Overall recruit ranking:
Note: In many cases, Scout, Rivals, 247Sports, On3, and ESPN may conflict in their listings of height and weight.; In these cases, the average was taken. ESPN grades are on a 100-point scale.; Sources: "2017 Team Ranking". Rivals.

== Schedule and results ==
Date time, TV	Rank^{#}	Opponent^{#}	Result	Record	High points	High rebounds	High assists	Site (attendance) city, state
Exhibition
Nov 4, 2017*; 7:00 pm		Wayne State (MI); City College Series	L 77–79		19 – Jackson	8 – Allen	3 – Black	Calihan Hall (3,089); Detroit, MI
Non-conference regular season
Nov 10, 2017*; 6:00 pm, ACCN Extra		at Virginia Tech; 2K Sports Classic campus game	L 79–111	0–1	23 – Chatman	7 – Tied	4 – Allen	Cassell Coliseum (9,275); Blacksburg, VA
Nov 13, 2017*; 7:00 pm, ESPN3		Michigan–Dearborn	W 105–82	1–1	17 – Chatham	7 – Tied	5 – Tied	Calihan Hall (1,112); Detroit, MI
Nov 18, 2017*; 2:00 pm		vs. Seattle; 2K Sports Classic	L 71–102	1–2	18 – Allen	6 – Prince	2 – Jackson Jr	Curb Event Center; Nashville, TN
Nov 19, 2017*; 4:00 pm		vs. Houston Baptist; 2K Sports Classic	W 116–109 ^{OT}	2–2	39 – Allen	16 – Chatman	8 – Jackson Jr.	Curb Event Center (350); Nashville, TN
Nov 22, 2017*; 8:00 pm, FSMW		at Saint Louis; 2K Sports Classic	W 72–70	3–2	22 – McFolley	9 – Tied	4 – Allen	Chaifetz Arena (6,026); St. Louis, MO
Nov 25, 2017*; 7:00 pm, ESPN3		Siena Heights	W 131–69	4–2	23 – Chatman	9 – Chatman	13 – Jackson Jr.	Calihan Hall (1,137); Detroit, MI
Nov 28, 2017*; 7:05 pm, CN81		at Fort Wayne	L 82–91	4–3	31 – Chatman	10 – Chatman	2 – 3 tied	Memorial Coliseum (1,357); Fort Wayne, IN
Dec 3, 2017*; 9:00 pm, P12N		at UCLA	L 73–106	4–4	18 – Chatman	7 – Chatman	3 – Tied	Pauley Pavilion (6,109); Los Angeles, CA
Dec 6, 2017*; 7:00 pm, WADL/ESPN3		Toledo	L 86–89	4–5	24 – McFolley	8 – Chatman	4 – Jackson Jr	Calihan Hall (1,218); Detroit, MI
Dec 9, 2017*; 2:00 pm, WADL/ESPN3		Western Michigan	L 79–87	4–6	32 – Allen	10 – Hogan	2 – 3 tied	Calihan Hall (1,307); Detroit, MI
Dec 16, 2017*; 12:00 pm, ESPNU		vs. Michigan; Detroit Showcase	L 58–90	4–7	18 – Chatman	13 – Chatman	2 – McFolley	Little Caesars Arena (20,645); Detroit, MI
Dec 19, 2017*; 7:00 pm, ESPN3		East Tennessee State	L 73–81	4–8	20 – Chatman	10 – Chatman	4 – Long	Calihan Hall (893); Detroit, MI
Dec 22, 2017*; 7:00 pm, WADL/ESPN3		Murray State	L 72–81	4–9	16 – Tied	7 – Prince	4 – Jackson Jr.	Calihan Hall (1,107); Detroit, MI
Horizon League regular season
Dec 28, 2017; 8:00 pm, ESPN3		at Green Bay	L 83–95	4–10 (0–1)	25 – Jackson Jr.	11 – Chatman	5 – Tied	Resch Center (2,284); Green Bay, WI
Dec 30, 2017; 7:00 pm, ESPN3		at Milwaukee	L 79–87	4–11 (0–2)	20 – Chatman	10 – Prince	3 – Chatman	UW–Milwaukee Panther Arena (986); Milwaukee, WI
Jan 5, 2018; 9:00 pm, ESPNU		Wright State	L 73–80	4–12 (0–3)	13 – Chatman	12 – Chatman	4 – Tied	Calihan Hall (561); Detroit, MI
Jan 7, 2018; 2:00 pm, WADL/ESPN3		Northern Kentucky	L 54–56	4–13 (0–4)	10 – 3 tied	13 – Allen	3 – Tied	Calihan Hall (1,061); Detroit, MI
Jan 10, 2018; 7:00 pm, WADL/ESPN3		Cleveland State	W 85–84	5–13 (1–4)	25 – Allen	8 – Tied	5 – Allen	Calihan Hall (1,027); Detroit, MI
Jan 12, 2018; 7:00 pm, WADL/ESPN3		Youngstown State	W 93–91	6–13 (2–4)	34 – Allen	9 – Prince	5 – Long	Calihan Hall (1,154); Detroit, MI
Jan 16, 2018; 7:00 pm, ESPN3		at IUPUI	L 73–80	6–14 (2–5)	15 – Jones	12 – Chatman	4 – Tied	Indiana Farmers Coliseum (561); Indianapolis, IN
Jan 20, 2018; 4:00 pm, WADL/ESPN3		Oakland	L 86–92	6–15 (2–6)	24 – Tied	10 – Chatman	3 – Tied	Calihan Hall (3,257); Detroit, MI
Jan 26, 2018; 7:00 pm, ESPN3		at Wright State	L 55–87	6–16 (2–7)	24 – Chatman	6 – Chatman	3 – Tied	Nutter Center (7,453); Fairborn, OH
Jan 28, 2018; 1:00 pm, ESPN3		at Northern Kentucky	L 44–72	6–17 (2–8)	11 – Allen	10 – Chatman	3 – Chatman	BB&T Arena (3,696); Highland Heights, KY
Feb 2, 2018; 7:00 pm, WADL/ESPN3		IUPUI	W 74–60	7–17 (3–8)	21 – Chatman	8 – Chatman	7 – Long	Calihan Hall (1,018); Detroit, MI
Feb 4, 2018; 2:00 pm, WADL/ESPN3		UIC	L 69–78	7–18 (3–9)	30 – McFolley	10 – Chatman	8 – Black	Calihan Hall (1,113); Detroit, MI
Feb 9, 2018; 7:00 pm, ESPN2		at Oakland	L 78–87	7–19 (3–10)	23 – Chatman	13 – Price	4 – Black	Athletics Center O'rena (3,664); Rochester, MI
Feb 14, 2018; 7:00 pm, ESPN3		at Cleveland State	L 72–75	7–20 (3–11)	22 – Prince	9 – Prince	6 – Allen	Wolstein Center (1,101); Cleveland, OH
Feb 16, 2018; 7:00 pm, ESPN3		at Youngstown State	W 94–84	8–20 (4–11)	26 – Chatman	11 – Chatman	3 – Tied	Beeghly Center (3,137); Youngstown, OH
Feb 19, 2018; 8:00 pm, ESPN3		at UIC	L 87–94	8–21 (4–12)	30 – Chatman	9 – Chatman	5 – Tied	UIC Pavilion (1,206); Chicago, IL
Feb 22, 2018; 7:00 pm, WADL/ESPN3		Milwaukee	L 49–72	8–22 (4–13)	13 – Allen	7 – Chatman	2 – Tied	Calihan Hall (1,102); Detroit, MI
Feb 24, 2018; 2:00 pm, WADL/ESPN3		Green Bay	L 97–107	8–23 (4–14)	34 – McFolley	10 – Prince	5 – Black	Calihan Hall (1,547); Detroit, MI
Horizon League tournament
Mar 2, 2018; 5:30 pm, ESPN3	(10)	vs. (7) Green Bay; First round	L 81–93	8–24	20 – Chatman	6 – Prince	5 – Prince	Little Caesars Arena (4,248); Detroit, MI
*Non-conference game. ^{#}Rankings from AP Poll. (#) Tournament seedings in parentheses. All times are in Eastern Time.
