= 2017–18 Northern Kentucky Norse men's basketball team =

American college basketball season

2017–18 Northern Kentucky Norse men's basketball
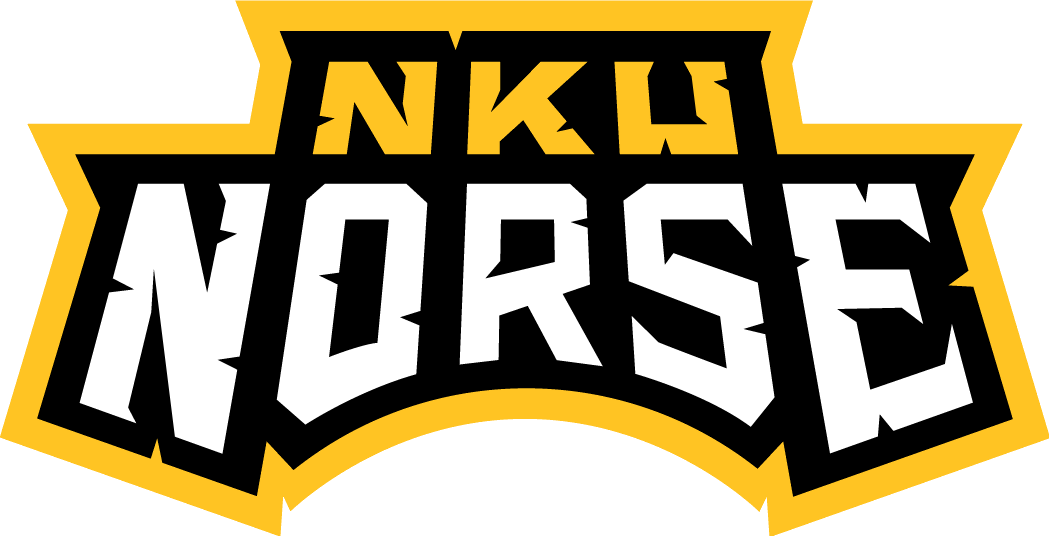

Horizon League regular season champions

NIT, First round
- Conference: Horizon League
- Record: 22–10 (15–3 Horizon)
- Head coach: John Brannen (3rd season)
- Assistant coaches: Sean Dwyer; Tim Morris; Chris Shumate
- Home arena: BB&T Arena

2017–18 Horizon League men's basketball standings
	Conf.				Overall
Team	W		L	PCT	W		L	PCT
Northern Kentucky	15	–	3	.833	22	–	10	.688
Wright State †	14	–	4	.778	25	–	10	.714
UIC	12	–	6	.667	20	–	16	.556
Oakland	10	–	8	.556	19	–	14	.576
Milwaukee	8	–	10	.444	16	–	17	.485
IUPUI	8	–	10	.444	11	–	19	.367
Green Bay	7	–	11	.389	13	–	20	.394
Cleveland State	6	–	12	.333	12	–	23	.343
Youngstown State	6	–	12	.333	8	–	24	.250
Detroit	4	–	14	.222	8	–	24	.250
† 2018 Horizon League Tournament winner

The 2017–18 Northern Kentucky Norse men's basketball team represented Northern Kentucky University (NKU) during the 2017–18 NCAA Division I men's basketball season. The Norse, led by third-year head coach John Brannen, played their home games at BB&T Arena in Highland Heights, Kentucky as members of the Horizon League. They finished the season 22–10, 15–3 in Horizon League play to win the Horizon League regular season championship. They were upset in the quarterfinals of the Horizon League tournament by No. 8 seed Cleveland State. As a regular season league champion who failed to win their league tournament, they received an automatic bid to the National Invitation Tournament where they lost in the first round to Louisville.

The Norse shared their home arena, BB&T Arena, with the University of Cincinnati's men's basketball team during the season while Cincinnati's home arena, Fifth Third Arena, underwent renovations during the season.

== Previous season ==
The Norse finished the 2016–17 season 24–11, 13–6 in Horizon League play to finish in a tie for third place. As the No. 4 seed in the Horizon League tournament, they defeated Wright State, Youngstown State, and Milwaukee to win the Horizon League tournament. They received the conference's automatic bid to the NCAA tournament in the school's first year of eligibility after its transition to a Division I school. They lost in the first round to Kentucky.

== Offseason ==
=== Departures ===
Name	Number	Pos.	Height	Weight	Year	Hometown	Reason for departure
Brandon Maxwell	2	G	6'2"	190	Sophomore	Orlando, FL	Transferred
Blake Spellman	3	G	5'11"	180	Freshman	Lee's Summit, MO	Transferred to Central Missouri
Brennan Gillis	13	F	6'7"	215	Sophomore	Indianapolis, IN	Left the team for personal reasons
Matt Rosenwinkel	22	G	6'2"	230	Senior	Rochelle, IL	Walk-on; graduated
Cole Murray	25	G	6'7"	210	Senior	Delphi, IN	Graduated

=== Incoming transfers ===
Name	Number	Pos.	Height	Weight	Year	Hometown	Previous School
Tyler Sharpe	15	G	6'1"	185	Sophomore	Louisville, KY	Transferred from Louisville. Under NCAA transfer rules, Sharpe will have to sit out for the 2017–18 season. Will have three years of remaining eligibility.

=== Recruiting class of 2017 ===
College recruiting information
Name	Hometown	School	Height	Weight	Commit date
Paul Djoko; PG	France	Champagne Châlons-reims Basket	6 ft 4 in (1.93 m)	190 lb (86 kg)	
Paul Djoko; PG	Recruit ratings: Scout: Rivals: (0)				
Chris Vogt; C	Mayfield, KY	Graves County High School	7 ft 0 in (2.13 m)	215 lb (98 kg)	
Chris Vogt; C	Recruit ratings: Scout: Rivals: (0)				
Overall recruit ranking:
Note: In many cases, Scout, Rivals, 247Sports, On3, and ESPN may conflict in their listings of height and weight.; In these cases, the average was taken. ESPN grades are on a 100-point scale.; Sources: "2017 Team Ranking". Rivals.

== Roster ==
2017–18 Northern Kentucky Norse men's basketball team
Players
Coaches

Pos.	#	Name	Height	Weight	Year	Previous school	Hometown
F	1	Jordan Garnett	6 ft 5 in (1.96 m)	220 lb (100 kg)	Sr	Warren Central High School	Indianapolis, Indiana
G	2	Paul Djoko	6 ft 4 in (1.93 m)	190 lb (86 kg)	Fr	Champagne Châlons-Reims Basket	Strasbourg, France
G	3	Tre Cobbs	5 ft 10 in (1.78 m)	185 lb (84 kg)	So	Lima Central Catholic High School	Lima, Ohio
F	4	Jeff Garrett	6 ft 6 in (1.98 m)	220 lb (100 kg)	RS Jr	Oldsmar Christian School; Alabama	Gadsden, Alabama
F	5	Jalen Tate	6 ft 5 in (1.96 m)	170 lb (77 kg)	RS Fr	Pickerington High School Central	Pickerington, Ohio
G	11	Mason Faulkner	6 ft 1 in (1.85 m)	165 lb (75 kg)	Fr	Caverna High School	Glasgow, Kentucky
G	15	Tyler Sharpe (redshirt)	6 ft 1 in (1.85 m)	185 lb (84 kg)	So	Bullitt East High School; Louisville	Mt. Washington, Kentucky
G	20	Nick Ayers (W)	6 ft 3 in (1.91 m)	190 lb (86 kg)	Sr	Simon Kenton High School	Independence, Kentucky
F	22	Darian Childress (W)	6 ft 8 in (2.03 m)	180 lb (82 kg)	Fr	Fern Creek High School	Louisville, Kentucky
F	23	Carson Williams	6 ft 5 in (1.96 m)	230 lb (104 kg)	So	Owen County High School	Owenton, Kentucky
G	30	Lavone Holland II	6 ft 1 in (1.85 m)	185 lb (84 kg)	Sr	Ballard High School; Coffeyville Community College	Louisville, Kentucky
G	32	Dantez Walton	6 ft 5 in (1.96 m)	205 lb (93 kg)	So	Lima Central Catholic High School	Lima, Ohio
C	33	Chris Vogt	7 ft 0 in (2.13 m)	240 lb (109 kg)	Fr	Graves County High School	Mayfield, Kentucky
F/C	34	Drew McDonald	6 ft 7 in (2.01 m)	250 lb (113 kg)	Jr	Newport Central Catholic High School	Cold Spring, Kentucky

Head coach

- John Brannen (Marshall)

Assistant coach(es)

- Sean Dwyer (Michigan State)
- Tim Morris (Stanford)
- Chris Shumate (Murray State)

Legend

- (C) Team captain
- (S) Suspended
- (I) Ineligible
- (W) Walk-on
- Injured
- Current redshirt

Roster
Last update: November 1, 2017

== Schedule and results ==
Date time, TV	Rank^{#}	Opponent^{#}	Result	Record	High points	High rebounds	High assists	Site (attendance) city, state
Exhibition
November 4, 2017*; 2:30 pm		Urbana	W 81–26		17 – McDonald	8 – Garrett	7 – Faulkner	BB&T Arena (2,713); Highland Heights, KY
Non-conference regular season
November 10, 2017*; 7:00 pm, ESPN3		East Tennessee State	W 81–63	1–0	22 – McDonald	10 – McDonald	5 – Faulkner/Holland	BB&T Arena (3,586); Highland Heights, KY
November 12, 2017*; 1:00 pm, ESPN3		Wilmington (OH)	W 93–65	2–0	18 – McDonald	15 – Garrett	5 – Walton	BB&T Arena (2,491); Highland Heights, KY
November 17, 2017*; 5:00 pm		vs. James Madison; The Islands of the Bahamas Showcase Quarterfinals	W 87–78	3–0	24 – Holland	7 – Williams	5 – Holland	Kendal Isaacs National Gymnasium; Nassau, Bahamas
November 18, 2017*; 8:00 pm		vs. Iona; The Islands of the Bahamas Showcase Semifinals	W 85–72	4–0	20 – Williams	6 – Williams	5 – Garnett/Holland	Kendal Isaacs National Gymnasium (417); Nassau, Bahamas
November 19, 2017*; 8:00 pm		vs. Vermont; The Islands of the Bahamas Showcase Championship	L 64–66	4–1	14 – Holland	6 – McDonald	5 – Holland	Kendal Isaacs National Gymnasium (477); Nassau, Bahamas
November 25, 2017*; 6:00 pm, ESPN3		at Memphis	L 74–76	4–2	19 – Holland	8 – McDonald	8 – Holland	FedExForum (5,369); Memphis, TN
November 29, 2017*; 7:00 pm, ESPN3		Berea	W 112–33	5–2	18 – Williams	8 – Garrett	7 – Faulkner	BB&T Arena (2,506); Highland Heights, KY
December 2, 2017*; 7:00 pm, CW Cincinnati		Morehead State	W 86–49	6–2	22 – McDonald	7 – Garrett	4 – Holland	BB&T Arena (4,064); Highland Heights, KY
December 6, 2017*; 7:00 pm, ESPN3		at East Tennessee State	L 71–84	6–3	22 – Williams	6 – McDonald	5 – Holland	Freedom Hall Civic Center (3,484); Johnson City, TN
December 10, 2017*; 6:00 pm, CW Cincinnati		Eastern Kentucky	W 91–63	7–3	23 – McDonald	9 – McDonald	6 – Faulkner	BB&T Arena (3,622); Highland Heights, KY
December 17, 2017*; 12:00 pm, ESPN3		at UMBC	L 75–76	7–4	24 – McDonald	11 – McDonald	6 – Holland	Retriever Activities Center (781); Catonsville, MD
December 19, 2017*; 8:00 pm, SECN+		at No. 8 Texas A&M	L 58–64	7–5	16 – McDonald	11 – McDonald	7 – Holland	Reed Arena (6,595); College Station, TX
Horizon League regular season
December 28, 2017; 7:30 pm, ESPN3		IUPUI	W 77–59	8–5 (1–0)	27 – McDonald	10 – McDonald	8 – Holland	BB&T Arena (4,203); Highland Heights, KY
December 30, 2017; 7:00 pm, CW Cincinnati		UIC	W 86–51	9–5 (2–0)	19 – McDonald	12 – McDonald	5 – Holland/Tate	BB&T Arena (3,688); Highland Heights, KY
January 5, 2018; 9:00 pm, ESPN2		at Oakland	W 87–83	10–5 (3–0)	21 – Williams	12 – McDonald	3 – Holland	Athletics Center O'rena (3,411); Rochester, MI
January 7, 2018; 2:00 pm, ESPN3		at Detroit	W 56–54	11–5 (4–0)	16 – McDonald	9 – McDonald	3 – Garnett	Calihan Hall (1,061); Detroit, MI
January 11, 2018; 7:00 pm, ESPN3		Wright State	L 81–84	11–6 (4–1)	22 – Holland	10 – McDonald	5 – Holland	BB&T Arena (4,987); Highland Heights, KY
January 15, 2018; 7:30 pm, ESPN3		Cleveland State	W 70–55	12–6 (5–1)	16 – Faulkner	9 – Williams	5 – McDonald	BB&T Arena (3,812); Highland Heights, KY
January 18, 2018; 8:00 pm, ESPN3		at Milwaukee	W 91–64	13–6 (6–1)	25 – McDonald	12 – McDonald	10 – Holland	UW–Milwaukee Panther Arena (1,009); Milwaukee, WI
January 20, 2018; 1:00 pm, ESPN3		at Green Bay	W 77–65	14–6 (7–1)	16 – Holland	6 – Garnett/Holland	4 – Garnett/Holland	Resch Center (3,119); Green Bay, WI
January 26, 2018; 9:00 pm, ESPNU		Oakland	L 70–83	14–7 (7–2)	19 – McDonald	10 – McDonald	5 – Faulkner	BB&T Arena (5,362); Highland Heights, KY
January 28, 2018; 1:00 pm, CW Cincinnati		Detroit	W 72–44	15–7 (8–2)	13 – Williams	13 – McDonald	5 – Tate	BB&T Arena (3,696); Highland Heights, KY
February 1, 2018; 7:00 pm, ESPN3		at Youngstown State	W 95–84	16–7 (9–2)	26 – McDonald	16 – McDonald	6 – Garnett	Beeghly Center (1,391); Youngstown, OH
February 3, 2018; 3:00 pm, ESPN3		at Cleveland State	W 78–61	17–7 (10–2)	21 – Holland	11 – Williams	7 – McDonald	Wolstein Center (1,853); Cleveland, OH
February 8, 2018; 7:30 pm, ESPN3		Milwaukee	W 54–52	18–7 (11–2)	16 – McDonald	10 – McDonald	6 – Holland	BB&T Arena (4,819); Highland Heights, KY
February 10, 2018; 7:00 pm, CW Cincinnati		Green Bay	W 86–80	19–7 (12–2)	19 – Sharpe	15 – McDonald	6 – Garnett	BB&T Arena (6,455); Highland Heights, KY
February 16, 2018; 7:00 pm, ESPN3		at Wright State	L 67–69	19–8 (12–3)	16 – Sharpe	12 – McDonald	4 – Holland	Nutter Center (7,205); Fairborn, OH
February 19, 2018; 7:30 pm, ESPN3		Youngstown State	W 70–51	20–8 (13–3)	27 – McDonald	12 – McDonald	4 – Holland	BB&T Arena (4,001); Highland Heights, KY
February 23, 2018; 8:00 pm, ESPN3		at UIC	W 79–72	21–8 (14–3)	25 – Holland	7 – McDonald	3 – Faulkner/Holland/Tate	UIC Pavilion (3,168); Chicago, IL
February 25, 2018; 1:00 pm, ESPN3		at IUPUI	W 75–56	22–8 (15–3)	17 – Holland	11 – McDonald	3 – Holland	Indiana Farmers Coliseum (1,534); Indianapolis, IN
Horizon League tournament
March 3, 2018; 8:00 pm, ESPN3	(1)	vs. (8) Cleveland State; Quarterfinals	L 80–89	22–9	24 – McDonald	13 – McDonald	5 – Holland	Little Caesars Arena (6,726); Detroit, MI
NIT
March 13, 2018*; 7:00 pm, ESPN	(7)	at (2) Louisville; First round – Baylor Bracket	L 58–66	22–10	19 – McDonald	13 – McDonald	3 – Tate	KFC Yum! Center (9,974); Louisville, KY
*Non-conference game. ^{#}Rankings from AP Poll. (#) Tournament seedings in parentheses. All times are in Eastern Time.
