= 2017–18 Milwaukee Panthers men's basketball team =

American college basketball season

2017–18 Milwaukee Panthers men's basketball
- Conference: Horizon League
- Record: 16–17 (8–10 Horizon)
- Head coach: Patrick Baldwin (1st season)
- Assistant coaches: Paris Parham; Terrance McGee; Pat Monaghan
- Home arena: UW–Milwaukee Panther Arena; Klotsche Center

2017–18 Horizon League men's basketball standings
	Conf.				Overall
Team	W		L	PCT	W		L	PCT
Northern Kentucky	15	–	3	.833	22	–	10	.688
Wright State †	14	–	4	.778	25	–	10	.714
UIC	12	–	6	.667	20	–	16	.556
Oakland	10	–	8	.556	19	–	14	.576
Milwaukee	8	–	10	.444	16	–	17	.485
IUPUI	8	–	10	.444	11	–	19	.367
Green Bay	7	–	11	.389	13	–	20	.394
Cleveland State	6	–	12	.333	12	–	23	.343
Youngstown State	6	–	12	.333	8	–	24	.250
Detroit	4	–	14	.222	8	–	24	.250
† 2018 Horizon League Tournament winner

The 2017–18 Milwaukee Panthers men's basketball team represented the University of Wisconsin–Milwaukee during the 2017–18 NCAA Division I men's basketball season. The Panthers, led by first-year head coach Pat Baldwin, played their home games at the UW–Milwaukee Panther Arena and the Klotsche Center as members of the Horizon League. They finished the season 16–17, 8–10 in Horizon League play to finish in a tie for fifth place. They defeated UIC in the quarterfinals of the Horizon League tournament before losing in the semifinals to Wright State.

== Previous season ==
The Panthers finished the 2016–17 season 11–24, 4–14 in Horizon League play to finish in last place. They defeated Detroit, Valparaiso, and UIC to advance to the championship game of the Horizon League tournament where they lost to Northern Kentucky.

On June 12, 2017, head coach LaVall Jordan left the school to accept the head coaching position at Butler, his alma mater. On June 20, the school named Patrick Baldwin head coach.

== Offseason ==
=== Departures ===
Name	Number	Pos.	Height	Weight	Year	Hometown	Reason for departure
Cody Wichmann	5	G	6'5"	210	Senior	Pulaski, WI	Graduated
Zac Saddler	11	F	6'7"	200	Freshman	New Braunfels, TX	Transferred to Western Texas College
Dan Studer	21	F	6'7"	230	Senior	Germantown, WI	Walk-on; graduated
Cameron Harvey	31	G	6'3"	205	RS Senior	Collegeville, PA	Graduated

=== Incoming transfers ===
Name	Number	Pos.	Height	Weight	Year	Hometown	Previous School
Vance Johnson	14	F	6'9"	240	Junior	Chicago, IL	Junior college transferred from Northeast CC

=== Recruiting class of 2017 ===
College recruiting
Name	Hometown	School	Height	Weight	Commit date
Carson Warren-Newsome; SG	Waukegan, IL	Waukegan High School	6 ft 6 in (1.98 m)	180 lb (82 kg)	Jun 18, 2016
Carson Warren-Newsome; SG	Recruit ratings: Scout: Rivals: (NR)				
Overall recruit ranking:
Note: In many cases, Scout, Rivals, 247Sports, On3, and ESPN may conflict in their listings of height and weight.; In these cases, the average was taken. ESPN grades are on a 100-point scale.; Sources: "2017 Team Ranking". Rivals.

=== Recruiting class of 2018 ===
College recruiting (2018)
Name	Hometown	School	Height	Weight	Commit date
Shea Mitchell #58 SF	Lakeville, MN	Lakeville South High School	6 ft 6 in (1.98 m)	N/A	Sep 10, 2017
Shea Mitchell #58 SF	Recruit ratings: Scout: Rivals: (78)				
Overall recruit ranking:
Note: In many cases, Scout, Rivals, 247Sports, On3, and ESPN may conflict in their listings of height and weight.; In these cases, the average was taken. ESPN grades are on a 100-point scale.; Sources: "2017 Team Ranking". Rivals.

== Roster ==
2017–18 Milwaukee Panthers men's basketball team
Players
Coaches

Pos.	#	Name	Height	Weight	Year	Previous school	Hometown
G	0	Bryce Barnes	5 ft 11 in (1.8 m)	172 lb (78 kg)	So	Bogan High School	Chicago, Illinois
G	1	Jeremiah Bell	6 ft 0 in (1.83 m)	171 lb (78 kg)	Jr	Vincennes	Louisville, Kentucky
G	3	Brock Stull	6 ft 4 in (1.93 m)	195 lb (88 kg)	RS Jr	Boylan Catholic High School	Rockford, Illinois
G	4	Jeremy Johnson	6 ft 3 in (1.91 m)	175 lb (79 kg)	RS So	Champlin Park High School	Brooklyn Park, Minnesota
G	5	Carson Warren-Newsome	6 ft 5 in (1.96 m)	175 lb (79 kg)	Fr	Waukegan High School	Waukegan, Illinois
G	10	Sam Burkart (W)	5 ft 11 in (1.8 m)	195 lb (88 kg)	So	Xavier High School	Kaukauna, Wisconsin
G	13	August Haas	6 ft 1 in (1.85 m)	187 lb (85 kg)	So	Gammel Hellerup Gymnasium	Copenhagen, Denmark
F	14	Vance Johnson	6 ft 9 in (2.06 m)	225 lb (102 kg)	Jr	Northeast Community College	Chicago, Illinois
G	15	Baylor Peterson (W)	6 ft 2 in (1.88 m)	180 lb (82 kg)	Jr	Edina High School	Edina, Minnesota
F	23	Seth Dittmer (W)	6 ft 9 in (2.06 m)	210 lb (95 kg)	So	Homeschooled	Pewaukee, Wisconsin
F	24	Bryce Nze	6 ft 7 in (2.01 m)	230 lb (104 kg)	So	Arrowhead High School	Hartland, Wisconsin
F	50	Brett Prahl	6 ft 9 in (2.06 m)	225 lb (102 kg)	RS Sr	East Troy High School	East Troy, Wisconsin
F	52	Alex Prahl	6 ft 9 in (2.06 m)	225 lb (102 kg)	RS Sr	East Troy High School	East Troy, Wisconsin

Head coach

- Patrick Baldwin (Northwestern)

Assistant coach(es)

- Paris Parham (Minnesota State)
- Terrance McGee (Missouri State)
- Pat Monaghan (Lewis)

Legend

- (C) Team captain
- (S) Suspended
- (I) Ineligible
- (W) Walk-on
- Injured
- Current redshirt

Roster

== Schedule and results ==
Date time, TV	Rank^{#}	Opponent^{#}	Result	Record	Site (attendance) city, state
Exhibition
Oct 22, 2017*; 4:00 pm		at Marquette; Charity relief exhibition	L 63–78		Al McGuire Center (2,108); Milwaukee, WI
Nov 2, 2017*; 7:00 pm		Wisconsin Lutheran	W 92–64		Klotsche Center (825); Milwaukee, WI
Non-conference regular season
Nov 10, 2017*; 7:00 pm, ESPN3		Wisconsin–La Crosse; Black & Gold Shootout	W 83–73	1–0	UW–Milwaukee Panther Arena (1,492); Milwaukee, WI
Nov 13, 2017*; 7:00 pm, Cyclones.tv		at Iowa State	W 74–56	2–0	Hilton Coliseum (13,853); Ames, IA
Nov 17, 2017*; 8:00 pm, ESPN3		Concordia–St. Paul; Black & Gold Shootout	L 55–69	2–1	UW–Milwaukee Panther Arena (1,686); Milwaukee, WI
Nov 18, 2017*; 5:30 pm, ESPN3		FIU; Black & Gold Shootout	W 66–51	3–1	UW–Milwaukee Panther Arena (1,313); Milwaukee, WI
Nov 19, 2017*; 3:30 pm, ESPN3		Elon; Black & Gold Shootout	W 72–71	4–1	UW–Milwaukee Panther Arena (1,103); Milwaukee, WI
Nov 24, 2017*; 8:00 pm, BTN		at Wisconsin	L 49–71	4–2	Kohl Center (17,287); Madison, WI
Nov 29, 2017*; 8:30 pm, ESPN3		at Northern Illinois	W 75–62	5–2	Convocation Center (1,216); DeKalb, IL
Dec 2, 2017*; 3:00 pm, FSWI		Montana State	L 64–68	5–3	UW–Milwaukee Panther Arena (1,596); Milwaukee, WI
Dec 5, 2017*; 6:00 pm, ESPN3		at Jacksonville	W 62–52	6–3	Swisher Gymnasium (619); Jacksonville, FL
Dec 9, 2017*; 7:00 pm		at Western Illinois	L 69–90	6–4	Western Hall (663); Macomb, IL
Dec 13, 2017*; 6:30 pm		at Belmont	L 63–82	6–5	Curb Event Center (1,612); Nashville
Dec 16, 2017*; 1:00 pm, FSWI		Loyola–Chicago	W 73–56	7–5	UW–Milwaukee Panther Arena (1,705); Milwaukee, WI
Dec 22, 2017*; 7:00 pm, ESPN3		Western Michigan	L 63–66	7–6	UW–Milwaukee Panther Arena (1,115); Milwaukee, WI
Horizon League regular season
Dec 28, 2017; 7:00 pm, ESPN3		Oakland	L 68–76	7–7 (0–1)	UW–Milwaukee Panther Arena (1,312); Milwaukee, WI
Dec 30, 2017; 6:00 pm, ESPN3		Detroit	W 87–79	8–7 (1–1)	UW–Milwaukee Panther Arena (986); Milwaukee, WI
Jan 4, 2018; 6:35 pm, ESPN3		at Youngstown State	L 63–72	8–8 (1–2)	Beeghly Center (1,484); Youngstown, OH
Jan 6, 2018; 2:30 pm, ESPN3		at Cleveland State	W 67–63	9–8 (2–2)	Wolstein Center (1,027); Cleveland, OH
Jan 10, 2018; 6:00 pm, ESPN3		at IUPUI	L 71–72	9–9 (2–3)	Indiana Farmers Coliseum (1,002); Indianapolis, IN
Jan 12, 2018; 7:00 pm, ESPN3		at UIC	L 73–88	9–10 (2–4)	UIC Pavilion (1,643); Chicago, IL
Jan 15, 2018; 7:00 pm, ESPN3		at Green Bay	L 92–99 ^{OT}	9–11 (2–5)	Resch Center (2,630); Green Bay, WI
Jan 18, 2018; 7:00 pm, ESPN3		Northern Kentucky	L 64–91	9–12 (2–6)	UW–Milwaukee Panther Arena (1,009); Milwaukee, WI
Jan 20, 2018; 7:00 pm, ESPN3		Wright State	W 66–61	10–12 (3–6)	UW–Milwaukee Panther Arena (1,603); Milwaukee, WI
Jan 25, 2018; 7:00 pm, FSWI		Youngstown State	W 66–55	11–12 (4–6)	UW–Milwaukee Panther Arena (1,677); Milwaukee, WI
Jan 27, 2018; 1:00 pm, FSWI		Cleveland State	W 70–47	12–12 (5–6)	UW–Milwaukee Panther Arena (1,865); Milwaukee, WI
Jan 29, 2018; 1:00 pm, ESPN3		UIC	L 56–74	12–13 (5–7)	UW–Milwaukee Panther Arena (1,057); Milwaukee, WI
Feb 2, 2018; 7:00 pm, ESPN3		Green Bay	W 76–58	13–13 (6–7)	UW–Milwaukee Panther Arena (1,973); Milwaukee, WI
Feb 8, 2018; 6:30 pm, ESPN3		at Northern Kentucky	L 52–54	13–14 (6–8)	BB&T Arena (4,819); Highland Heights, KY
Feb 10, 2018; 6:00 pm, ESPN3		at Wright State	W 74–73	14–14 (7–8)	Nutter Center (5,713); Fairborn, OH
Feb 16, 2018; 7:00 pm, ESPN3		IUPUI	L 71–76 ^{OT}	14–15 (7–9)	UW–Milwaukee Panther Arena (2,871); Milwaukee, WI
Feb 22, 2018; 6:00 pm, ESPN3		at Detroit	W 72–49	15–15 (8–9)	Calihan Hall (1,102); Detroit, MI
Feb 24, 2018; 2:00 pm, ESPN3		at Oakland	L 70–72	15–16 (8–10)	Athletics Center O'rena; Rochester, MI
Horizon League tournament
Mar 4, 2018; 5:00 pm, ESPN3	(6)	vs. (3) UIC; Quarterfinals	W 80–75	16–16	Little Caesars Arena (6,771); Detroit, MI
Mar 5, 2018; 9:30 pm, ESPNU	(6)	vs. (2) Wright State; Semifinals	L 53–59	16–17	Little Caesars Arena (5,398); Detroit, MI
*Non-conference game. ^{#}Rankings from AP Poll. (#) Tournament seedings in parentheses. All times are in Eastern Time.
