= 2017–18 Oakland Golden Grizzlies men's basketball team =

American college basketball season

2017–18 Oakland Golden Grizzlies men's basketball
- Conference: Horizon League
- Record: 19–14 (10–8 Horizon)
- Head coach: Greg Kampe (34th season)
- Associate head coach: Dan Hipsher
- Assistant coaches: Tony Jones; Mychal Covington
- Home arena: Athletics Center O'rena

2017–18 Horizon League men's basketball standings
| | Conf. | | | | Overall |
| Team | W | | L | PCT | W | | L | PCT |
|---|---|---|---|---|---|---|---|---|
| Northern Kentucky | 15 | – | 3 | .833 | 22 | – | 10 | .688 |
| Wright State † | 14 | – | 4 | .778 | 25 | – | 10 | .714 |
| UIC | 12 | – | 6 | .667 | 20 | – | 16 | .556 |
| Oakland | 10 | – | 8 | .556 | 19 | – | 14 | .576 |
| Milwaukee | 8 | – | 10 | .444 | 16 | – | 17 | .485 |
| IUPUI | 8 | – | 10 | .444 | 11 | – | 19 | .367 |
| Green Bay | 7 | – | 11 | .389 | 13 | – | 20 | .394 |
| Cleveland State | 6 | – | 12 | .333 | 12 | – | 23 | .343 |
| Youngstown State | 6 | – | 12 | .333 | 8 | – | 24 | .250 |
| Detroit | 4 | – | 14 | .222 | 8 | – | 24 | .250 |
† 2018 Horizon League Tournament winner

The 2017–18 Oakland Golden Grizzlies men's basketball team represented Oakland University (OU) during the 2017–18 NCAA Division I men's basketball season. The Golden Grizzlies were led by 34th-year head coach Greg Kampe and played their home games at the Athletics Center O'rena in Rochester, Michigan as members of the Horizon League.

Oakland made a three-point field goal in every game of the season, increasing their steak to 937 consecutive games, the eighth-longest active NCAA Division I streak (at the time). They last finished a game without a three-pointer on January 30, 1988.

== Previous season ==
The Golden Grizzlies finished the 2016–17 season 25–9, 14–4 in Horizon League play to win a share for the Horizon League regular season championship. As the No. 1 seed in the Horizon League tournament, they were upset in the quarterfinals by Youngstown State. As a conference champion and No. 1 seed who failed to win their conference tournament, they received an automatic bid to the National Invitation Tournament where they defeated Clemson in the first round before losing to Richmond in the second round.

== Off-season ==
=== Roster changes ===
The Golden Grizzlies lost Sherron Dorsey-Walker, a guard on the 2016–17 team, to graduation. Prior to the season, sophomore Isaiah Brock unexpectedly decided to leave the team. Brock was named to the Horizon League's All-Defensive Team and All-Freshman Team. Senior guard Stevie Clark also left the team, transferring to Louisiana State University in Shreveport.

=== 2017 recruiting class ===
College recruiting information
| Name | Hometown | School | Height | Weight | Commit date |
|---|---|---|---|---|---|
| James Beck; SF | Grand Rapids, MI | Grand Rapids Christian High School | 6 ft 7 in (2.01 m) | N/A | |
| James Beck; SF | Recruit ratings: No ratings found | | | | |
| Stan Scott; SF | Williamsport, PA | Williamsport High School | N/A | N/A | |
| Stan Scott; SF | Recruit ratings: No ratings found | | | | |
Overall recruit ranking:
Note: In many cases, Scout, Rivals, 247Sports, On3, and ESPN may conflict in their listings of height and weight.; In these cases, the average was taken. ESPN grades are on a 100-point scale.; Sources: "Oakland Golden Grizzlies". ESPN.; "2017 Team Ranking". Rivals.

== Preseason polls ==
Preseason poll
| School | Points |
| Oakland (31) | 453 |
| Northern Kentucky (10) | 414 |
| UIC (3) | 347 |
| Detroit (1) | 273 |
| Wright State | 259 |
| Green Bay | 249 |
| Youngstown State (1) | 209 |
| Milwaukee (1) | 161 |
| Cleveland State | 125 |
| IUPUI | 95 |
First place votes in parentheses.

Oakland was picked by coaches, media and sports information directors to finish first the Horizon League. Oakland received 31 of the 47 votes for first place ahead of second place Northern Kentucky. The adjacent table shows the complete preseason poll. Seniors Jalen Hayes and Martez Walker were selected to the preseason first team and Kendrick Nunn was selected to the second team.

Oakland played three exhibition games, defeating Central Michigan, Rochester College and Davenport in games at the O'rena. The 108–88 victory against Central Michigan was a special game to raise money for the American Red Cross and hurricane relief.

== Roster ==
The following table lists Oakland's roster.

2017–18 Oakland Golden Grizzlies men's basketball team
Players
Coaches

| Pos. | # | Name | Height | Weight | Year | Previous school | Hometown |
|---|---|---|---|---|---|---|---|
| G | 22 | James Beck | 6 ft 8 in (2.03 m) | 210 lb (95 kg) | Fr | Grand Rapids Christian H.S. | Grand Rapids, Michigan |
| C | 13 | Brad Brechting (injured) | 6 ft 11 in (2.11 m) | 217 lb (98 kg) | Jr | Cedar Springs H.S. | Cedar Springs, Michigan |
| F | 10 | Isaiah Brock | 6 ft 8 in (2.03 m) | 191 lb (87 kg) | So | Forest Park H.S. | Baltimore, Maryland |
| F | 32 | Tom Cotter (W) | 6 ft 8 in (2.03 m) | 232 lb (105 kg) | Sr | Wayne State | Williamston, Michigan |
| G | 21 | Jaevin Cumberland (injured) | 6 ft 2 in (1.88 m) | 179 lb (81 kg) | Jr | Wilmington H.S. | Wilmington, Ohio |
| G | 2 | Nick Daniels | 6 ft 1 in (1.85 m) | 170 lb (77 kg) | RS Sr | John Glenn H.S. | Westland, Michigan |
| G | 0 | Chris Gilbert (W) | 6 ft 2 in (1.88 m) | 181 lb (82 kg) | RS Fr | Fenton H.S. | Fenton, Michigan |
| F | 4 | Jalen Hayes | 6 ft 7 in (2.01 m) | 213 lb (97 kg) | RS Sr | Sexton H.S. | Lansing, Michigan |
| F | 14 | Xavier Hill-Mais (redshirt) | 6 ft 7 in (2.01 m) | 248 lb (112 kg) | Jr | Page H.S. | Greensboro, North Carolina |
| G | 11 | Brailen Neely (injured) | 5 ft 9 in (1.75 m) | 154 lb (70 kg) | So | Western H.S. | Detroit, Michigan |
| G | 24 | Karmari Newman (redshirt) | 6 ft 4 in (1.93 m) | 170 lb (77 kg) | So | George Mason | Detroit, Michigan |
| G | 1 | Kendrick Nunn | 6 ft 3 in (1.91 m) | 193 lb (88 kg) | RS Sr | Illinois | Chicago, Illinois |
| F | 44 | Julius Palmer | 6 ft 9 in (2.06 m) | 215 lb (98 kg) | Jr | McLennan C.C. | Detroit, Michigan |
| G/F | 15 | Chris Palombizio | 6 ft 6 in (1.98 m) | 212 lb (96 kg) | So | Don Bosco Prep | Chesterton, Indiana |
| G | 12 | Stan Scott | 6 ft 3 in (1.91 m) | 180 lb (82 kg) | Fr | Williamsport H.S. | Williamsport, Pennsylvania |
| G | 35 | Martez Walker (injured) | 6 ft 6 in (1.98 m) | 185 lb (84 kg) | RS Sr | Texas | Detroit, Michigan |

Head coach

- Greg Kampe

Assistant coach(es)

- Dan Hipsher
- Tony Jones
- Mychal Covington

Legend

- (C) Team captain
- (S) Suspended
- (I) Ineligible
- (W) Walk-on
- Injured
- Current redshirt

Roster
Last update: February 15, 2018

== Schedule and results ==
The following is Oakland's schedule.

| Date time, TV | Rank^{#} | Opponent^{#} | Result | Record | Site (attendance) city, state |
Exhibition
| October 29, 2017*; 1:00 pm | | Central Michigan; Hurricane Relief Charity Game | W 108–88 | | Athletics Center O'rena; Rochester, MI |
| November 2, 2017*; 7:00 pm, ESPN3 | | Rochester College | W 91–73 | | Athletics Center O'rena (1,745); Rochester, MI |
| November 6, 2017*; 7:00 pm, ESPN3 | | Davenport | W 102–61 | | Athletics Center O'rena (1,701); Rochester, MI |
Non-conference regular season
| November 10, 2017*; 7:00 pm, WMYD/ESPN3 | | Fort Wayne | W 85–71 | 1–0 | Athletics Center O'rena (3,579); Rochester, MI |
| November 13, 2017*; 7:00 pm, WMYD/ESPN3 | | New Orleans | W 87–68 | 2–0 | Athletics Center O'rena (2,944); Rochester, MI |
| November 18, 2017*; 7:00 pm, ESPN3 | | at Toledo; Hoophall Miami Invitational | L 74-87 | 2–1 | Savage Arena (4,436); Toledo, OH |
| November 20, 2017*; 7:00 pm, ESPN3 | | at Syracuse; Hoophall Miami Invitational | L 50-74 | 2–2 | Carrier Dome (15,534); Syracuse, NY |
| November 24, 2017*; 8:00 pm, ESPN3 | | at No. 3 Kansas; Hoophall Miami Invitational | L 59-102 | 2–3 | Allen Fieldhouse (16,300); Lawrence, KS |
| November 27, 2017*; 8:00 pm, ESPN3 | | at Oral Roberts | W 93–86 ^{OT} | 3–3 | Mabee Center (1,754); Tulsa, OK |
| November 30, 2017*; 7:00 pm, WMYD/ESPN3 | | Texas Southern; Hoophall Miami Invitational | W 97–87 | 4–3 | Athletics Center O'rena (2,854); Rochester, MI |
| December 2, 2017*; 2:00 pm, ESPN3 | | at Western Michigan | W 78–73 | 5–3 | University Arena (2,418); Kalamazoo, MI |
| December 6, 2017*; 7:00 pm, ESPN3 | | at Eastern Michigan | L 89-95 | 5–4 | Convocation Center (1,666); Ypsilanti, MI |
| December 9, 2017*; 3:00 pm, WMYD/ESPN3 | | Chicago State | W 82–50 | 6–4 | Athletics Center O'rena (3,286); Rochester, MI |
| December 16, 2017*; 2:30 pm, ESPNU | | vs. No. 2 Michigan State; Hitachi College Basketball Showcase | L 73-86 | 6–5 | Little Caesars Arena (20,695); Detroit, MI |
| December 20, 2017*; 7:00 pm, WMYD/ESPN3 | | Towson | W 97–86 | 7–5 | Athletics Center O'rena (2,422); Rochester, MI |
| December 22, 2017*; 7:00 pm, WMYD/ESPN3 | | Eastern Michigan | W 86–81 | 8–5 | Athletics Center O'rena (3,661); Rochester, MI |
Horizon League regular season
| December 28, 2017; 8:00 pm, ESPN3 | | at Milwaukee | W 76–68 | 9–5 (1–0) | UW–Milwaukee Panther Arena (1,312); Milwaukee, WI |
| December 30, 2017; 1:00 pm, ESPN3 | | at Green Bay | L 79-80 | 9–6 (1–1) | Resch Center (2,683); Green Bay, WI |
| January 5, 2018; 9:00 pm, ESPN2 | | Northern Kentucky | L 83-87 | 9–7 (1–2) | Athletics Center O'rena (3,411); Rochester, MI |
| January 7, 2018; 3:00 pm, WMYD/ESPN3 | | Wright State | L 81-86 ^{OT} | 9–8 (1–3) | Athletics Center O'rena (3,208); Rochester, MI |
| January 10, 2018; 7:00 pm, ESPN3 | | Youngstown State | W 95–82 | 10–8 (2–3) | Athletics Center O'rena (2,657); Rochester, MI |
| January 12, 2018; 7:00 pm, WMYD/ESPN3 | | Cleveland State | W 81–68 | 11–8 (3–3) | Athletics Center O'rena (3,156); Rochester, MI |
| January 15, 2018; 8:00 pm, NBCSC | | at UIC | W 78–68 | 12–8 (4–3) | UIC Pavilion (2,080); Chicago, IL |
| January 20, 2018; 4:00 pm, WADL/ESPN3 | | at Detroit | W 92–86 | 13–8 (5–3) | Calihan Hall (3,257); Detroit, MI |
| January 26, 2018; 9:00 pm, ESPNU | | at Northern Kentucky | W 83–70 | 14–8 (6–3) | BB&T Arena (5,362); Highland Heights, KY |
| January 28, 2018; 2:00 pm, ESPN3 | | at Wright State | L 51-64 | 14–9 (6–4) | Nutter Center (4,491); Dayton, OH |
| February 2, 2018; 9:00 pm, ESPNU | | UIC | L 73-79 | 14–10 (6–5) | Athletics Center O'rena (3,182); Rochester, MI |
| February 4, 2018; Noon, ESPN3 | | IUPUI | W 82–74 | 15–10 (7–5) | Athletics Center O'rena (2,710); Rochester, MI |
| February 9, 2018; 9:00 pm, ESPN2 | | Detroit | W 87–78 | 16–10 (8–5) | Athletics Center O'rena (3,664); Rochester, MI |
| February 14, 2018; 7:00 pm, ESPN3 | | at Youngstown State | L 73-75 | 16–11 (8–6) | Beeghly Center (1,513); Youngstown, OH |
| February 16, 2018; 7:00 pm, ESPN3 | | at Cleveland State | W 82–66 | 17–11 (9–6) | Wolstein Center (1,725); Cleveland, OH |
| February 19, 2018; 7:00 pm, ESPN3 | | at IUPUI | L 67-74 | 17–12 (9–7) | Indiana Farmers Coliseum (1,063); Indianapolis, IN |
| February 22, 2018; 7:00 pm, WMYD/ESPN3 | | Green Bay | L 90-96 | 17–13 (9–8) | Athletics Center O'rena (3,211); Rochester, MI |
| February 24, 2018; 3:00 pm, WMYD/ESPN3 | | Milwaukee | W 72–70 | 18–13 (10–8) | Athletics Center O'rena (3,508); Rochester, MI |
Horizon League tournament
| March 4, 2018; 7:30 pm, ESPN3 | (4) | vs. (5) IUPUI; Quarterfinals | W 62–55 | 19–13 | Little Caesars Arena (6,771); Detroit, MI |
| March 5, 2018; 7:00 pm, ESPN3 | (4) | vs. (8) Cleveland State; Semifinals | L 43–44 | 19–14 | Little Caesars Arena (5,398); Detroit, MI |
*Non-conference game. ^{#}Rankings from AP Poll. (#) Tournament seedings in parentheses. All times are in Eastern Time.

== Rankings ==
Oakland received 19 points in the preseason Coaches Poll and 2 points in the AP Poll. USA Today named the Golden Grizzlies a team that was "snubbed" by not being ranked in the preseason Top 25.

The team was also ranked No. 5 in the preseason Collegeinsider.com Mid-Major Top 25.

Ranking movements Legend: ██ Increase in ranking ██ Decrease in ranking — = Not ranked RV = Received votes
| | Week | | | | | | | | | | | | | | | | | | | |
| Poll | Pre | 1 | 2 | 3 | 4 | 5 | 6 | 7 | 8 | 9 | 10 | 11 | 12 | 13 | 14 | 15 | 16 | 17 | 18 | Final |
|---|---|---|---|---|---|---|---|---|---|---|---|---|---|---|---|---|---|---|---|---|
| AP | RV | RV | — | — | — | — | — | — | — | | | | | | | | | | | Not released |
| Coaches | RV | RV | RV | — | — | — | — | — | — | | | | | | | | | | | |
| Mid-Major Top 25 | 5 | 5 | 7 | 15 | 13 | RV | RV | 25 | — | | | | | | | | | | | |
