= 2018 Horizon League men's basketball tournament =

- Classification: Division I
- Season: 2017–18
- Teams: 10
- Site: Little Caesars Arena; Detroit, Michigan
- Champions: Wright State (2nd title)
- Winning coach: Scott Nagy (1st title)
- MVP: Grant Benzinger (Wright State)
- Television: ESPN, ESPNU, ESPN3

2017–18 Horizon League men's basketball standings
	Conf.				Overall
Team	W		L	PCT	W		L	PCT
Northern Kentucky	15	–	3	.833	22	–	10	.688
Wright State †	14	–	4	.778	25	–	10	.714
UIC	12	–	6	.667	20	–	16	.556
Oakland	10	–	8	.556	19	–	14	.576
Milwaukee	8	–	10	.444	16	–	17	.485
IUPUI	8	–	10	.444	11	–	19	.367
Green Bay	7	–	11	.389	13	–	20	.394
Cleveland State	6	–	12	.333	12	–	23	.343
Youngstown State	6	–	12	.333	8	–	24	.250
Detroit	4	–	14	.222	8	–	24	.250
† 2018 Horizon League Tournament winner

The 2018 Horizon League men's basketball tournament (also known as Motor City Madness) was the postseason men's basketball tournament for the Horizon League of the 2017–18 NCAA Division I men's basketball season. It was held from March 2 through March 6, 2018 at Little Caesars Arena in Detroit. The tournament was won by No. 2 seed Wright State, who defeated No. 8 seed Cleveland State in the championship game, and received the conference's automatic berth into the NCAA tournament.

== Seeds ==
All 10 teams participated in the tournament. The top six teams received a bye into the quarterfinals. Teams were seeded by record within the conference, with a tiebreaker system to seed teams with identical conference records.

Seed	School	Conference	Tiebreaker
1	Northern Kentucky	15–3	
2	Wright State	14–4	
3	UIC	12–6	
4	Oakland	10–8	
5	IUPUI	8–10	2–0 vs. Milwaukee
6	Milwaukee	8–10	0–2 vs. IUPUI
7	Green Bay	7–11	
8	Cleveland State	6–12	1–1 vs. YSU, 0–2 vs. NKU, 1–1 vs. WSU
9	Youngstown State	6–12	1–1 vs. CSU, 0–2 vs. NKU, 0–2 vs. WSU
10	Detroit	4–14	

== Schedule ==
Game	Time	Matchup	Score	Television
First round – Friday, March 2
1	5:30 pm	No. 7 Green Bay vs. No. 10 Detroit	93–81	ESPN3
2	8:00 pm	No. 8 Cleveland State vs. No. 9 Youngstown State	72–71	ESPN3
Quarterfinals – Saturday, March 3
3	5:30 pm	No. 2 Wright State vs. No. 7 Green Bay	87–72	ESPN3
4	8:00 pm	No. 1 Northern Kentucky vs. No. 8 Cleveland State	80–89	ESPN3
Quarterfinals – Sunday, March 4
5	5:00 pm	No. 3 UIC vs. No. 6 Milwaukee	75–80	ESPN3
6	7:30 pm	No. 4 Oakland vs. No. 5 IUPUI	62–55	ESPN3
Semifinals – Monday, March 5
7	7:00 pm	No. 4 Oakland vs. No. 8 Cleveland State	43–44	ESPNU
8	9:30 pm	No. 2 Wright State vs. No. 6 Milwaukee	59–53	ESPNU
Finals – Tuesday, March 6
9	7:00 pm	No. 2 Wright State vs. No. 8 Cleveland State	74–57	ESPN
All game times in Eastern Time Zone. Rankings denote tournament seed

== Bracket ==
First round Friday, March 2 ESPN3
8	Cleveland State	72
9	Youngstown State	71
7	Green Bay	93
10	Detroit	81

Quarterfinals; Saturday/Sunday, March 3/4; ESPN3
1	Northern Kentucky	80
8	Cleveland State	89
4	Oakland	62
5	IUPUI	55
2	Wright State	87
7	Green Bay	72
3	UIC	75
6	Milwaukee	80

Semifinals; Monday, March 5 ESPNU
8	Cleveland State	44
4	Oakland	43
2	Wright State	59
6	Milwaukee	53

Finals; Tuesday, March 6 ESPN
8	Cleveland State	57
2	Wright State	74
