= 2017–18 IUPUI Jaguars men's basketball team =

American college basketball season

2017–18 IUPUI Jaguars men's basketball
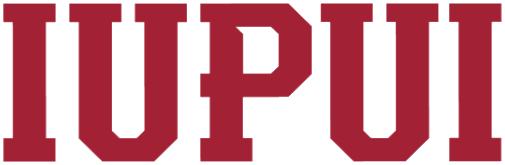
- Conference: Horizon League
- Record: 11–19 (8–10 Horizon)
- Head coach: Jason Gardner (4th season)
- Assistant coaches: Matt Crenshaw; Roy Hairston; Matt Bringman
- Home arena: Indiana Farmers Coliseum; The Jungle

2017–18 Horizon League men's basketball standings
	Conf.				Overall
Team	W		L	PCT	W		L	PCT
Northern Kentucky	15	–	3	.833	22	–	10	.688
Wright State †	14	–	4	.778	25	–	10	.714
UIC	12	–	6	.667	20	–	16	.556
Oakland	10	–	8	.556	19	–	14	.576
Milwaukee	8	–	10	.444	16	–	17	.485
IUPUI	8	–	10	.444	11	–	19	.367
Green Bay	7	–	11	.389	13	–	20	.394
Cleveland State	6	–	12	.333	12	–	23	.343
Youngstown State	6	–	12	.333	8	–	24	.250
Detroit	4	–	14	.222	8	–	24	.250
† 2018 Horizon League Tournament winner

The 2017–18 IUPUI Jaguars men's basketball team represented Indiana University–Purdue University Indianapolis during the 2017–18 NCAA Division I men's basketball season. The Jaguars, led by fourth-year head coach Jason Gardner, played their home games at Indiana Farmers Coliseum in Indianapolis, Indiana, with one home game at The Jungle, as first-year members of the Horizon League. They finished the season 11–19, 8–10 in Horizon League play, to finish in a tie for fifth place. They lost in the quarterfinals of the Horizon League tournament to Oakland.

The season marked the first season as members of the Horizon League as IUPUI replaced Valparaiso who left to join the Missouri Valley Conference.

== Previous season ==
The Jaguars finished the season 14–18, 7–9 in Summit League play, to finish in seventh place. They defeated North Dakota State in the quarterfinals of the Summit League tournament to advance to the semifinals where they lost to Omaha.

This was the Jaguars' final season as a member of the Summit League as the school announced on June 28, 2017, that it would be joining the Horizon League effective July 1, 2017.

== Departures ==
Name	Number	Pos.	Height	Weight	Year	Hometown	Reason for departure
Darell Combs	0	G	6'2"	195	RS Senior	Chicago, IL	Graduated
Anthony Jones	2	G	6'5"	210	RS Freshman	Indianapolis, IN	Transferred to Coffeyville CC
Kellon Thomas	5	G	5'11"	190	RS Senior	Indianapolis, IN	Graduated
Josh James	11	F/C	6'9"	225	Junior	Cedar Lake, IN	Left the team for personal reasons
Matt O'Leary	15	F	6'8"	225	RS Senior	Terre Haute, IN	Graduated
Grant Sinn	20	G	6'2"	180	RS Freshman	Spencerville, IN	Walk-on; left the team for personal reasons
Giovanni Fraser	33	F	6'8"	235	Freshman	Coral Springs, FL	Transferred to Daytona State College

=== Incoming transfers ===
Name	Number	Pos.	Height	Weight	Year	Hometown	Previous school
Camron Justice	5	G	6'3"	180	Junior	Hindman, KY	Transferred from Vanderbilt. Under NCAA transfer rules, Justice will have to sit out for the 2017–18 season. Will have two years of remaining eligibility.
Ahmed Ismail	15	C	7'2"	285	Senior	Cairo, Egypt	Transferred from Manhattan. Under NCAA transfer rules, Ismail will have to sit out for the 2017–18 season. Will have one year of remaining eligibility.
Maurice Kirby	31	F	6'9"	240	Senior	Chandler, AZ	Transferred from Loyola–Chicago. Will be eligible to play immediately since Kirby graduated from Loyola–Chicago.

== Recruiting class of 2017 ==
College recruiting information
Name	Hometown	School	Height	Weight	Commit date
Jaylen Minnett; PG	Terre Haute, IN	South Vigo High School	6 ft 0 in (1.83 m)	150 lb (68 kg)	Feb 1, 2016
Jaylen Minnett; PG	Recruit ratings: Scout: Rivals: (NR)				
Overall recruit ranking:
Note: In many cases, Scout, Rivals, 247Sports, On3, and ESPN may conflict in their listings of height and weight.; In these cases, the average was taken. ESPN grades are on a 100-point scale.; Sources: "2017 Team Ranking". Rivals.

== Roster ==
2017–18 IUPUI Jaguars men's basketball team
Players
Coaches

Pos.	#	Name	Height	Weight	Year	Previous school	Hometown
G	0	Jaylen Minnett	6 ft 1 in (1.85 m)	180 lb (82 kg)	RS Fr	Terre Haute South	Terre Haute, IN
G	1	T. J. Henderson	6 ft 0 in (1.83 m)	160 lb (73 kg)	Jr	Scecina	Indianapolis, IN
G	5	Camron Justice (redshirt)	6 ft 3 in (1.91 m)	180 lb (82 kg)	Jr	Knott County Central; Vanderbilt	Hindman, KY
G	10	Nick Rogers	6 ft 1 in (1.85 m)	170 lb (77 kg)	RS So	Traders Point Academy; Toledo	Indianapolis, IN
G	12	Chad Hudson	5 ft 11 in (1.8 m)	175 lb (79 kg)	So	Jeffersonville/Don Bosco Prep	Jeffersonville, IN
C	15	Ahmed Ismail (redshirt)	7 ft 1 in (2.16 m)	260 lb (118 kg)	Sr	Nakhas Zagazig; Manhattan	Cairo, Egypt
G	22	D. J. McCall	6 ft 6 in (1.98 m)	190 lb (86 kg)	RS Jr	Concordia Lutheran	Fort Wayne, IN
F	24	Evan Hall	6 ft 7 in (2.01 m)	200 lb (91 kg)	Jr	Hindman, KY
G	25	Ron Patterson	6 ft 2 in (1.88 m)	200 lb (91 kg)	RS Sr	Knott County Central	Indianapolis, IN
G	31	Maurice Kirby	6 ft 9 in (2.06 m)	240 lb (109 kg)	RS Sr	Basha; Loyola–Chicago	Chandler, AZ
F	32	Elyjah Goss	6 ft 7 in (2.01 m)	190 lb (86 kg)	RS Fr	Plainfield East	Plainfield, IL
F/C	35	Noah Thomas	6 ft 9 in (2.06 m)	235 lb (107 kg)	RS So	Bridgton Academy	Lafayette, IN
F	40	Evan Borgman (W)	6 ft 9 in (2.06 m)	205 lb (93 kg)	RS Fr	Jac-Cen-Del	Batesville, IN
F	45	Aaron Brennan	6 ft 6 in (1.98 m)	200 lb (91 kg)	Sr	Guerin Catholic	Noblesville, IN

Head coach

- Jason Gardner (Arizona)

Assistant coach(es)

- Matt Crenshaw (IUPUI)
- Roy Hairston (Purdue)
- Matt Bringman (Palm Beach Atlantic)

Legend

- (C) Team captain
- (S) Suspended
- (I) Ineligible
- (W) Walk-on
- Injured
- Current redshirt

Roster
Last update: August 11, 2024

== Schedule and results ==
Date time, TV	Rank^{#}	Opponent^{#}	Result	Record	Site (attendance) city, state
Exhibition
November 3, 2017*; 7:00 p.m., ESPN3		Carroll	W 65–56		Indiana Farmers Coliseum (784); Indianapolis, IN
Non-conference regular season
November 11, 2017*; 2:00 p.m., ESPN3		at Bradley	L 53–68	0–1	Carver Arena (4,936); Peoria, IL
November 13, 2017*; 7:00 p.m., ESPN3		Anderson (IN)	W 75–43	1–1	Indiana Farmers Coliseum (1,175); Indianapolis, IN
November 17, 2017*; 8:30 p.m.		at Eastern Illinois	L 79–80	1–2	Lantz Arena (769); Charleston, IL
November 21, 2017*; 7:00 p.m., ESPN3		Morehead State	W 67–61	2–2	Indiana Farmers Coliseum (1,012); Indianapolis, IN
November 28, 2017*; 8:00 p.m., ESPN3		at Western Illinois	L 77–90	2–3	Western Hall (589); Macomb, IL
December 2, 2017*; 2:00 p.m., ESPN3		at Ball State	L 64–83	2–4	Worthen Arena (3,505); Muncie, IN
December 6, 2017*; 7:00 p.m., ESPN3		SIU Edwardsville	L 81–82	2–5	Indiana Farmers Coliseum (809); Indianapolis, IN
December 10, 2017*; 7:00 p.m., BTN		at No. 21 Purdue	L 61–86	2–6	Mackey Arena (13,641); West Lafayette, IN
December 16, 2017*; 6:00 p.m., P12N		at Washington State	L 59–72	2–7	Beasley Coliseum (2,240); Pullman, WA
December 18, 2017*; 9:00 p.m., RTNW		at No. 12 Gonzaga	L 71–101	2–8	McCarthey Athletic Center (6,000); Spokane, WA
December 22, 2017*; 12:00 p.m., ESPN3		IU Kokomo	W 87–76	3–8	The Jungle (615); Indianapolis, IN
Horizon League regular season
December 28, 2017; 7:30 p.m., ESPN3		at Northern Kentucky	L 59–77	3–9 (0–1)	BB&T Arena (4,203); Highland Heights, KY
December 30, 2017; 4:00 p.m., ESPN3		at Wright State	L 52–60	3–10 (0–2)	Nutter Center (3,649); Fairborn, OH
January 2, 2018; 8:00 p.m., ESPN3		at Green Bay	W 67–63	4–10 (1–2)	Resch Center (1,932); Green Bay, WI
January 4, 2018; 7:00 p.m., ESPN3		UIC	L 65–70	4–11 (1–3)	Indiana Farmers Coliseum (815); Indianapolis, IN
January 10, 2018; 7:00 p.m., ESPN3		Milwaukee	W 72–71	5–11 (2–3)	Indiana Farmers Coliseum (1,002); Indianapolis, IN
January 12, 2018; 7:00 p.m., ESPN3		Green Bay	W 67–61	6–11 (3–3)	Indiana Farmers Coliseum (827); Indianapolis, IN
January 16, 2018; 7:00 p.m., ESPN3		Detroit	W 81–66	7–11 (4–3)	Indiana Farmers Coliseum (802); Indianapolis, IN
January 18, 2018; 7:00 p.m., ESPN3		at Cleveland State	L 67–70	7–12 (4–4)	Wolstein Center (1,125); Cleveland, OH
January 20, 2018; 7:00 p.m., ESPN3		at Youngstown State	L 62–85	7–13 (4–5)	Beeghly Center (3,222); Youngstown, OH
January 27, 2018; 4:00 p.m., ESPN3		at UIC	L 62–71	7–14 (4–6)	UIC Pavilion (3,373); Chicago, IL
February 2, 2018; 7:00 p.m., ESPN3		at Detroit	L 60–74	7–15 (4–7)	Calihan Hall (1,018); Detroit, MI
February 4, 2018; 12:00 p.m., ESPN3		at Oakland	L 74–82	7–16 (4–8)	Athletics Center O'rena (2,710); Rochester, MI
February 8, 2018; 7:00 p.m., ESPN3		Cleveland State	W 78–73	8–16 (5–8)	Indiana Farmers Coliseum (910); Indianapolis, IN
February 10, 2018; 1:00 p.m., ESPN3		Youngstown State	L 80–84	8–17 (5–9)	Indiana Farmers Coliseum (905); Indianapolis, IN
February 16, 2018; 8:00 p.m., ESPN3		at Milwaukee	W 76–71 ^{OT}	9–17 (6–9)	UW–Milwaukee Panther Arena (2,871); Milwaukee, WI
February 19, 2018; 7:00 p.m., ESPN3		Oakland	W 74–67	10–17 (7–9)	Indiana Farmers Coliseum (1,063); Indianapolis, IN
February 23, 2018; 11:00 a.m., ESPN3		Wright State	W 66–56	11–17 (8–9)	Indiana Farmers Coliseum (2,263); Indianapolis, IN
February 25, 2018; 1:00 p.m., ESPN3		Northern Kentucky	L 56–75	11–18 (8–10)	Indiana Farmers Coliseum (1,534); Indianapolis, IN
Horizon League tournament
March 4, 2018; 7:30 p.m., ESPN3	(5)	vs. (4) Oakland; Quarterfinals	L 55–62	11–19	Little Caesars Arena (6,771); Detroit, MI
*Non-conference game. ^{#}Rankings from AP poll. (#) Tournament seedings in parentheses. All times are in Eastern.
