= 2017–18 Wright State Raiders men's basketball team =

American college basketball season

2017–18 Wright State Raiders men's basketball

Horizon League tournament champions

NCAA tournament, First Round
- Conference: Horizon League
- Record: 25–10 (14–4 Horizon)
- Head coach: Scott Nagy (2nd season)
- Assistant coaches: Brian Cooley; Sharif Chambliss; Clint Sargent
- Home arena: Nutter Center

2017–18 Horizon League men's basketball standings
	Conf.				Overall
Team	W		L	PCT	W		L	PCT
Northern Kentucky	15	–	3	.833	22	–	10	.688
Wright State †	14	–	4	.778	25	–	10	.714
UIC	12	–	6	.667	20	–	16	.556
Oakland	10	–	8	.556	19	–	14	.576
Milwaukee	8	–	10	.444	16	–	17	.485
IUPUI	8	–	10	.444	11	–	19	.367
Green Bay	7	–	11	.389	13	–	20	.394
Cleveland State	6	–	12	.333	12	–	23	.343
Youngstown State	6	–	12	.333	8	–	24	.250
Detroit	4	–	14	.222	8	–	24	.250
† 2018 Horizon League Tournament winner

The 2017–18 Wright State Raiders men's basketball team represented Wright State University during the 2017–18 NCAA Division I men's basketball season. The Raiders, led by second-year head coach Scott Nagy, played their home games at the Nutter Center in Fairborn, Ohio, as members of the Horizon League. They finished the season 25–10, 14–4 in Horizon League play to finish in second place. In the Horizon League tournament, they defeated Green Bay, Milwaukee, and Cleveland State to become Horizon League Tournament champions. This received the Horizon League's automatic bid to the NCAA tournament, where they lost to Tennessee in the first round.

== Previous season ==
The Raiders finished the 2016–17 season 20–12, 11–7 in Horizon League play to finish fifth place. In the Horizon League tournament, they lost to Northern Kentucky in the quarterfinals. Despite having 20 wins, they did not participate in a postseason tournament.

== Offseason ==
=== Departures ===
Name	Number	Pos.	Height	Weight	Year	Hometown	Reason for departure
Steven Davis	0	F	6'7"	220	RS Senior	Indianapolis, IN	Graduated
Mike LaTulip	5	G	6'1"	175	RS Senior	Arlington Heights, IL	Graduated
Mark Alstork	24	G	6'5"	190	RS Junior	Dayton, OH	Graduate transferred to Illinois

=== Incoming transfers ===
Name	Number	Pos.	Height	Weight	Year	Hometown	Previous school
Billy Wampler	2	F	6'6"	200	Junior	Eau Claire, WI	Transferred from Drake. Under NCAA transfer rules, Wampler will have to sit out for the 2017–18 season. Will have two years of remaining eligibility.

=== Recruiting class of 2017 ===
College recruiting information
Name	Hometown	School	Height	Weight	Commit date
Tyler Mitchell; PG	Kings Mill, OH	Kings High School	6 ft 0 in (1.83 m)	180 lb (82 kg)	Sep 26, 2016
Tyler Mitchell; PG	Recruit ratings: Scout: Rivals: (NR)				
Jaylon Hall; SG	Louisville, KY	Doss High School	6 ft 5 in (1.96 m)	200 lb (91 kg)	Sep 20, 2016
Jaylon Hall; SG	Recruit ratings: Scout: Rivals: (NR)				
James Manns, Jr. SF	Columbus, OH	Kingston Academy	6 ft 7 in (2.01 m)	205 lb (93 kg)	
James Manns, Jr. SF	Recruit ratings: Scout: Rivals: (NR)				
Overall recruit ranking:
Note: In many cases, Scout, Rivals, 247Sports, On3, and ESPN may conflict in their listings of height and weight.; In these cases, the average was taken. ESPN grades are on a 100-point scale.; Sources: "2017 Team Ranking". Rivals.

=== Recruiting class of 2018 ===
College recruiting information (2018)
Name	Hometown	School	Height	Weight	Commit date
Skyelar Potter; PG	Bowling Green, KY	Warren Central High School	6 ft 2 in (1.88 m)	170 lb (77 kg)	Nov 7, 2017
Skyelar Potter; PG	Recruit ratings: Scout: Rivals: (NR)				
Malachi Smith; SG	Belleville, IL	Belleville West High School	6 ft 3 in (1.91 m)	182 lb (83 kg)	Oct 20, 2017
Malachi Smith; SG	Recruit ratings: Scout: Rivals: (NR)				
Jeremiah Davenport; SF	Cincinnati, OH	Archbishop Moeller High School	6 ft 5 in (1.96 m)	190 lb (86 kg)	Oct 16, 2017
Jeremiah Davenport; SF	Recruit ratings: Scout: Rivals: (NR)				
Grant Basile; PF	Pewaukee, WI	Pewaukee High School	6 ft 8 in (2.03 m)	200 lb (91 kg)	Jul 15, 2017
Grant Basile; PF	Recruit ratings: Scout: Rivals: (NR)				
Overall recruit ranking:
Note: In many cases, Scout, Rivals, 247Sports, On3, and ESPN may conflict in their listings of height and weight.; In these cases, the average was taken. ESPN grades are on a 100-point scale.; Sources: "2018 Team Ranking". Rivals.

== Roster ==
2017–18 Wright State Raiders men's basketball team
Players
Coaches

Pos.	#	Name	Height	Weight	Year	Previous school	Hometown
G	0	Jaylon Hall	6 ft 5 in (1.96 m)	175 lb (79 kg)	Fr	Doss HS	Houston, TX
G	1	Justin Mitchell	6 ft 4 in (1.93 m)	190 lb (86 kg)	Sr	Wayne HS	Fort Wayne, IN
G/F	2	Everett Winchester	6 ft 6 in (1.98 m)	195 lb (88 kg)	So	Gilman School	Baltimore, MD
G	3	Mark Hughes	6 ft 4 in (1.93 m)	180 lb (82 kg)	Jr	Ursuline HS	Youngstown, OH
G	4	Alan Vest	6 ft 3 in (1.91 m)	185 lb (84 kg)	Jr	Chaminade-Julienne HS	Kettering, OH
G	5	Tyler Mitchell	6 ft 0 in (1.83 m)	180 lb (82 kg)	Fr	Kings HS	Kings Mills, OH
G	10	Adam Giles (W)	6 ft 3 in (1.91 m)	195 lb (88 kg)	Jr	Miamisburg HS	Miamisburg, OH
C	11	Loudon Love	6 ft 9 in (2.06 m)	275 lb (125 kg)	RS Fr	Geneva HS	Geneva, IL
G	12	Tye Wilburn (W)	5 ft 11 in (1.8 m)	185 lb (84 kg)	RS Jr	Lake Central HS; Kilgore	Schereville, IN
G	13	Grant Benzinger	6 ft 3 in (1.91 m)	190 lb (86 kg)	Sr	Moeller HS	Cincinnati, OH
F	15	James Manns	6 ft 7 in (2.01 m)	205 lb (93 kg)	Fr	Walnut Ridge HS	Columbus, OH
F	20	Bill Wampler (redshirt)	6 ft 6 in (1.98 m)	200 lb (91 kg)	Jr	Regis HS; Drake	Eau Claire, WI
G	21	Trey Stacey (W)	6 ft 4 in (1.93 m)	200 lb (91 kg)	Sr	Moeller HS	Cincinnati, OH
F/C	22	Parker Ernsthausen (W)	6 ft 11 in (2.11 m)	235 lb (107 kg)	RS Jr	Toledo St. John's HS	Bowling Green, OH
G	31	Cole Gentry	5 ft 10 in (1.78 m)	170 lb (77 kg)	RS So	St. Charles East HS; South Dakota State	St. Charles, IL
F	33	Ryan Custer	6 ft 7 in (2.01 m)	235 lb (107 kg)	So	Elder HS	Cincinnati, OH

Head coach

- Scott Nagy (Delta State)

Assistant coach(es)

- Brian Cooley (Nebraska Wesleyan)
- Sharif Chambliss (Wisconsin)
- Clint Sargent (South Dakota State)

Legend

- (C) Team captain
- (S) Suspended
- (I) Ineligible
- (W) Walk-on
- Injured
- Current redshirt

Roster
Last update: November 2, 2017

== Schedule and results ==
Date time, TV	Rank^{#}	Opponent^{#}	Result	Record	High points	High rebounds	High assists	Site (attendance) city, state
Exhibition
Nov 3, 2017*; 7:00 pm		Wayne State (NE)	W 73–58		23 – Mitchell	12 – Tied	3 – Tied	Nutter Center; Fairborn, OH
Non-Conference regular season
Nov 10, 2017*; 8:00 pm, ESPN3		at Loyola–Chicago	L 80–84	0–1	16 – Benzinger	8 – Mitchell	4 – Tied	Joseph J. Gentile Arena (2,814); Chicago, IL
Nov 14, 2017*; 7:00 pm, ESPN3		at Miami (OH)	L 67–73 ^{OT}	0–2	14 – Hughes	12 – Love	3 – Wilburn	Millett Hall (996); Oxford, OH
Nov 18, 2017*; 7:00 pm, ESPN3		Murray State	L 61–80	0–3	14 – Love	8 – Love	2 – Tied	Nutter Center (4,009); Fairborn, OH
Nov 20, 2017*; 7:00 pm, ESPN3		Tiffin; Wright State Tournament	W 73–49	1–3	18 – Winchester	7 – Winchester	5 – Mitchell	Nutter Center (3,133); Fairborn, OH
Nov 24, 2017*; 7:00 pm, ESPN3		Gardner–Webb; Wright State Tournament	W 64–47	2–3	18 – Benzinger	9 – Love	4 – Mitchell	Nutter Center (3,456); Fairborn, OH
Nov 25, 2017*; 5:00 pm, ESPN3		Jacksonville; Wright State Tournament	W 68–44	3–3	16 – Benzinger	9 – Love	4 – Ernsthausen	Nutter Center (3,030); Fairborn, OH
Nov 26, 2017*; 3:30 pm, ESPN3		Fairfield; Wright State Tournament	W 57–56	4–3	21 – Mitchell	13 – Love	3 – Mitchell	Nutter Center (3,045); Fairborn, OH
Dec 2, 2017*; 5:00 pm, FCS Central		at Western Kentucky	L 60–78	4–4	19 – Benzinger	7 – Tied	7 – Mitchell	E.A. Diddle Arena (4,165); Bowling Green, KY
Dec 5, 2017*; 7:00 pm, ESPN3		Ohio Valley	W 98–68	5–4	17 – Hall	9 – Love	4 – Winchester	Nutter Center (3,060); Fairborn, OH
Dec 9, 2017*; 3:00 pm, ESPN3		Kent State	W 63–54	6–4	13 – Benzinger	11 – Mitchell	4 – Hughes	Nutter Center (3,448); Fairborn, OH
Dec 16, 2017*; 2:00 pm, ESPN3		at Toledo	W 77–69	7–4	18 – Mitchell	12 – Tied	3 – Hughes	Savage Arena (3,932); Toledo, OH
Dec 19, 2017*; 8:00 pm, ESPN3		at Missouri State	L 50–66	7–5	18 – Mitchell	8 – Love	4 – Hughes	JQH Arena (3,123); Springfield, MO
Dec 22, 2017*; 9:00 pm, RSN		at Georgia Tech	W 85–81	8–5	22 – Benzinger	12 – Love	7 – Hughes	McCamish Pavilion (4,522); Atlanta, GA
Horizon League regular season
Dec 28, 2017; 7:00 pm, ESPN3		UIC	W 65–61	9–5 (1–0)	14 – Mitchell	11 – Benzinger	5 – Hughes	Nutter Center (3,397); Fairborn, OH
Dec 30, 2017; 4:00 pm, ESPN3		IUPUI	W 60–52	10–5 (2–0)	16 – Benzinger	13 – Mitchell	4 – Mitchell	Nutter Center (3,649); Fairborn, OH
Jan 5, 2018; 9:00 pm, ESPNU		at Detroit	W 80–73	11–5 (3–0)	23 – Benzinger	14 – Love	5 – Ernsthausen	Calihan Hall (561); Detroit, MI
Jan 7, 2018; 3:00 pm, ESPN3		at Oakland	W 86–81 ^{OT}	12–5 (4–0)	25 – Love	17 – Love	7 – Gentry	Athletics Center O'rena (3,208); Rochester, MI
Jan 11, 2018; 7:00 pm, ESPN3		at Northern Kentucky	W 84–81	13–5 (5–0)	31 – Benzinger	10 – Love	3 – Tied	BB&T Arena (4,987); Highland Heights, KY
Jan 15, 2018; 4:00 pm, ESPN3		Youngstown State	W 77–67	14–5 (6–0)	16 – Hall/Love	8 – Benzinger	6 – Gentry	Nutter Center (4,409); Fairborn, OH
Jan 18, 2018; 8:00 pm, ESPN3		at Green Bay	W 80–67	15–5 (7–0)	23 – Gentry	14 – Love	5 – Ernsthausen	Resch Center (2,264); Green Bay, WI
Jan 20, 2018; 8:00 pm, ESPN3		at Milwaukee	L 61–66	15–6 (7–1)	16 – Love	7 – Tied	3 – Tied	UW–Milwaukee Panther Arena (1,603); Milwaukee, WI
Jan 26, 2018; 7:00 pm, ESPN3		Detroit	W 87–55	16–6 (8–1)	17 – Benzinger	5 – Tied	4 – Gentry	Nutter Center (7,543); Fairborn, OH
Jan 28, 2018; 2:00 pm, ESPN3		Oakland	W 64–51	17–6 (9–1)	18 – Love	17 – Love	4 – Gentry	Nutter Center (4,491); Fairborn, OH
Feb 1, 2018; 7:00 pm, ESPN3		at Cleveland State	L 74–77	17–7 (9–2)	20 – Tied	12 – Love	7 – Hughes	Wolstein Center (1,411); Cleveland, OH
Feb 3, 2018; 7:00 pm, ESPN3		at Youngstown State	W 83–57	18–7 (10–2)	21 – Gentry	9 – Tied	5 – Tied	Beeghly Center (5,371); Youngstown, OH
Feb 8, 2018; 7:30 pm, ESPN3		Green Bay	W 68–64	19–7 (11–2)	22 – Benzinger	14 – Hughes	3 – Tied	Nutter Center (4,714); Fairborn, OH
Feb 10, 2018; 7:00 pm, ESPN3		Milwaukee	L 73–74	19–8 (11–3)	20 – Love	19 – Love	3 – Tied	Nutter Center (5,713); Fairborn, OH
Feb 16, 2018; 7:00 pm, ESPN3		Northern Kentucky	W 69–67	20–8 (12–3)	15 – Love	6 – Tied	3 – Tied	Nutter Center (7,205); Fairborn, OH
Feb 19, 2018; 7:30 pm, ESPN3		Cleveland State	W 72–63	21–8 (13–3)	20 – Benzinger	6 – Tied	5 – Benzinger	Nutter Center (3,745); Fairborn, OH
Feb 23, 2018; 11:00 am, ESPN3		at IUPUI	L 56–66	21–9 (13–4)	12 – Winchester	8 – Love	3 – Gentry	Indiana Farmers Coliseum (2,263); Indianapolis, IN
Feb 25, 2018; 6:00 pm, ESPN3		at UIC	W 88–81	22–9 (14–4)	23 – Love	15 – Love	5 – Love	UIC Pavilion (3,091); Chicago, IL
Horizon League tournament
Mar 3, 2018; 5:30 pm, ESPN3	(2)	vs. (7) Green Bay; Quarterfinals	W 87–72	23–9	17 – Love	9 – Benzinger	5 – Gentry	Little Caesars Arena (6,276); Detroit, MI
Mar 5, 2018; 9:30 pm, ESPNU	(2)	vs. (6) Milwaukee; Semifinals	W 59–53	24–9	18 – Love	12 – Love	2 – Tied	Little Caesars Arena (5,398); Detroit, MI
Mar 6, 2018; 7:00 pm, ESPN	(2)	vs. (8) Cleveland State; Championship	W 74–57	25–9	19 – Benzinger	12 – Love	3 – Tied	Little Caesars Arena (7,595); Detroit, MI
NCAA tournament
Mar 15, 2018*; 12:40 pm, truTV	(14 S)	vs. (3 S) No. 13 Tennessee; First Round	L 47–73	25–10	12 – Love	9 – Love	4 – Hughes	American Airlines Center (15,802); Dallas, TX
*Non-conference game. ^{#}Rankings from AP Poll. (#) Tournament seedings in parentheses. S=South. All times are in Eastern Time.

== Awards and honors ==
Grant Benzinger	MVP
Grant Benzinger	Kendall Griffin Raider Award
Grant Benzinger	First Team All Horizon League
Loudon Love	Horizon League all Newcomer Team
Mark Hughes	Horizon League All Defensive Team
Scott Nagy	Horizon League Coach of the Year

== Statistics ==
Number	Name	Games	Average	Points	Assists	Rebounds
13	Grant Benzinger	35	14.3	499	41	189
11	Loudon Love	35	12.9	451	38	341
3	Mark Hughes	35	9.7	340	105	109
00	Jaylon Hall	33	9.1	300	47	84
02	Everett Winchester	33	8.0	264	37	124
31	Cole Gentry	25	9.1	228	65	71
22	Parker Ernsthausen	35	5.3	186	56	90
1	Justin Mitchell	16	11.1	178	50	113
12	Tye Wilburn	20	2.0	40	16	37
4	Alan Vest	14	0.8	11	4	13
21	Trey Stacey	9	0.2	2	0	4
10	Adam Giles	7	0.1	1	1	3
