= 2017–18 Youngstown State Penguins men's basketball team =

American college basketball season

2017–18 Youngstown State Penguins men's basketball
- Conference: Horizon League
- Record: 8–24 (6–12 Horizon)
- Head coach: Jerrod Calhoun (1st season)
- Assistant coaches: Bobby Steinburg; Paul Molinari; Jason Slay
- Home arena: Beeghly Center

2017–18 Horizon League men's basketball standings
	Conf.				Overall
Team	W		L	PCT	W		L	PCT
Northern Kentucky	15	–	3	.833	22	–	10	.688
Wright State †	14	–	4	.778	25	–	10	.714
UIC	12	–	6	.667	20	–	16	.556
Oakland	10	–	8	.556	19	–	14	.576
Milwaukee	8	–	10	.444	16	–	17	.485
IUPUI	8	–	10	.444	11	–	19	.367
Green Bay	7	–	11	.389	13	–	20	.394
Cleveland State	6	–	12	.333	12	–	23	.343
Youngstown State	6	–	12	.333	8	–	24	.250
Detroit	4	–	14	.222	8	–	24	.250
† 2018 Horizon League Tournament winner

The 2017–18 Youngstown State Penguins men's basketball team represented Youngstown State University during the 2017–18 NCAA Division I men's basketball season. The Penguins, led by first-year head coach Jerrod Calhoun, played their home games at the Beeghly Center as members of the Horizon League. They finished the season 8–24, 6–12 in Horizon League play to finish in a tie for eighth place. They lost in the first round of the Horizon League tournament to Cleveland State.

== Previous season ==
The Penguins finished the 2016–17 season 13–21, 5–13 in Horizon League play to finish in a tie for eighth place. As the No. 9 seed in the Horizon League tournament, they defeated Cleveland State and Oakland before losing to Northern Kentucky in the semifinals.

On March 7, 2017, Jerry Slocum announced he was retiring as head coach at Youngstown State. He had a record of 142–232 in 12 years at the school. On March 27, the school hired Jerrod Calhoun from Division II Fairmont State as the new head coach.

== Offseason ==
=== Departures ===
Name	Number	Pos.	Height	Weight	Year	Hometown	Reason for departure
Matt Donlan	0	F	6'7"	190	RS Senior	Melbourne, Australia	Graduated
Latin Davis	11	G	5'11"	165	Sophomore	Ypsilanti, MI	Graduate transferred to Wayne State
Noah Dean	12	G	6'4"	175	Freshman	Greenville, SC	Walk-on; transferred
Tyler Warford	14	G	6'1"	170	Senior	Pittsburgh, PA	Walk-on; graduated
Brett Frantz	15	G	6'3"	185	RS Senior	Lawrence, KS	Graduated
Stefan Rosic	21	F	6'7"	200	Junior	Kragujevac, Serbia	Graduate transferred to Southeastern Oklahoma State
Rahim Williams	22	G/F	6'6"	190	Junior	Toronto, ON	Graduate transferred to Shaw
Jordan Kaufman	32	C	7'0"	250	RS Senior	Andover, KS	Graduated

=== Incoming transfers ===
Name	Number	Pos.	Height	Weight	Year	Hometown	Previous School
Tyree Robinson	0	F	6'4"	200	Junior	Fitchburg, MA	Junior college transferred from Odessa College
Jaylen Benton	4	G	6'3"	180	Senior	Columbus, OH	Transferred from Southeast Missouri State. Will be eligible to play immediately since Benton graduated from Southeast Missouri State. Will join the team as a walk-on.
Alex Wilbourn	13	C	6'11"	205	Junior	San Diego, CA	Junior college transferred from San Diego City College.
Noe Anabir	21	F	6'7"	220	Junior	Geneva, Switzerland	Junior college transferred from Mesa CC
Devin Morgan	22	G	5'10"	180	Junior	Chester, VA	Transferred from Delaware State. Under NCAA transfer rules, Morgan will have to sit out for the 2017–18 season. Will have two years of remaining eligibility.

=== Recruiting class of 2017 ===
College recruiting information
Name	Hometown	School	Height	Weight	Commit date
Garrett Covington; SG	Carmel, IN	Don Bosco Preparatory School	6 ft 5 in (1.96 m)	190 lb (86 kg)	Apr 15, 2017
Garrett Covington; SG	Recruit ratings: Scout: Rivals: (NR)				
Michael Akuchie; SF	Fort Lauderdale, FL	St. Thomas Aquinas High School	6 ft 8 in (2.03 m)	215 lb (98 kg)	Apr 25, 2017
Michael Akuchie; SF	Recruit ratings: Scout: Rivals: (NR)				
Naz Bohannon; SF	Lorain, OH	Lorain High School	6 ft 6 in (1.98 m)	215 lb (98 kg)	Apr 18, 2017
Naz Bohannon; SF	Recruit ratings: Scout: Rivals: (NR)				
Jacob Brown; PF	Clemmons, NC	Forest Trails Academy	6 ft 9 in (2.06 m)	190 lb (86 kg)	Apr 15, 2017
Jacob Brown; PF	Recruit ratings: Scout: Rivals: (NR)				
Overall recruit ranking:
Note: In many cases, Scout, Rivals, 247Sports, On3, and ESPN may conflict in their listings of height and weight.; In these cases, the average was taken. ESPN grades are on a 100-point scale.; Sources: "2017 Team Ranking". Rivals.

=== Recruiting class of 2018 ===
College recruiting information (2018)
Name	Hometown	School	Height	Weight	Commit date
Darius Quisenberry; PG	Dayton, OH	Wayne High School	6 ft 0 in (1.83 m)	160 lb (73 kg)	Sep 19, 2017
Darius Quisenberry; PG	Recruit ratings: Scout: Rivals: (NR)				
Jelani Simmons; SG/SF	Columbus, OH	Beechcroft High School	6 ft 6 in (1.98 m)	180 lb (82 kg)	Aug 2, 2017
Jelani Simmons; SG/SF	Recruit ratings: Scout: Rivals: (NR)				
Overall recruit ranking:
Note: In many cases, Scout, Rivals, 247Sports, On3, and ESPN may conflict in their listings of height and weight.; In these cases, the average was taken. ESPN grades are on a 100-point scale.; Sources: "2018 Team Ranking". Rivals.

== Roster ==
2017–18 Youngstown State Penguins men's basketball team
Players
Coaches

Pos.	#	Name	Height	Weight	Year	Previous school	Hometown
F	0	Tyree Robinson	6 ft 5 in (1.96 m)	220 lb (100 kg)	Jr	Durfee High School; Odessa College	Fall River, MA
G	1	Braun Hartfield	6 ft 6 in (1.98 m)	185 lb (84 kg)	So	Garfield Heights High School	Cleveland, OH
F	2	Devin Haygood	6 ft 7 in (2.01 m)	185 lb (84 kg)	Jr	Lincoln High School	Ypsilanti, MI
G	4	Jaylen Benton (W)	6 ft 3 in (1.91 m)	180 lb (82 kg)	Sr	Westerville North High School; Southeast Missouri State	Columbus, OH
G	5	Jeremiah Ferguson	6 ft 2 in (1.88 m)	180 lb (82 kg)	So	Marist High School	Naperville, IL
G	10	Ryan Strollo (W)	6 ft 2 in (1.88 m)	190 lb (86 kg)	RS Sr	Ursuline High School	Youngstown, OH
G	11	Dan Ritter (W)	6 ft 3 in (1.91 m)	176 lb (80 kg)	Fr	South Range High School	North Lima, OH
C	13	Alex Wilbourn	7 ft 0 in (2.13 m)	204 lb (93 kg)	Jr	Mission Bay High School; San Diego CC	San Diego, CA
F	14	Jacob Brown	6 ft 9 in (2.06 m)	195 lb (88 kg)	Fr	Forest Hill Academy	Clemmons, NC
G	20	Geoff Hamperian (W)	6 ft 4 in (1.93 m)	200 lb (91 kg)	RS Fr	University High School	Morgantown, WV
F	21	Noe Anabir	6 ft 8 in (2.03 m)	226 lb (103 kg)	Jr	Lions of Geneva; Mesa CC	Geneva, Switzerland
G	22	Devin Morgan	5 ft 10 in (1.78 m)	180 lb (82 kg)	Jr	Matoaca High School; Delaware State	Chester, VA
G	23	Francisco Santiago	6 ft 1 in (1.85 m)	160 lb (73 kg)	RS Sr	Saint Ignatius High School; Wheeling Jesuit	Cleveland, OH
G	24	Cameron Morse	6 ft 3 in (1.91 m)	185 lb (84 kg)	Sr	Carman-Ainsworth High School	Flint, MI
G	30	John Kirincic (W)	6 ft 1 in (1.85 m)	175 lb (79 kg)	So	Spire Academy	University Heights, OH
F	31	Michael Akuchie	6 ft 8 in (2.03 m)	215 lb (98 kg)	Fr	St. Thomas Aquinas High School	Plantation, FL
G	32	Garrett Covington	6 ft 5 in (1.96 m)	195 lb (88 kg)	Fr	Carmel High School	Carmel, IN
F	33	Naz Bohannon	6 ft 6 in (1.98 m)	230 lb (104 kg)	Fr	Lorain High School	Lorain, OH
G	34	Justin Bofenkamp (W)	6 ft 0 in (1.83 m)	180 lb (82 kg)	Fr	Warren JFK High School	Vienna, OH
C	50	John Jr. Sally (W)	6 ft 11 in (2.11 m)	250 lb (113 kg)	Fr	Benedictine College Prep	Disputanta, VA

Head coach

- Jerrod Calhoun (Cincinnati)

Assistant coach(es)

- Bobby Steinburg (Middle Tennessee)
- Paul Molinari (Villanova)
- Jason Slay (West Virginia State)

Legend

- (C) Team captain
- (S) Suspended
- (I) Ineligible
- (W) Walk-on
- Injured
- Current redshirt

Roster

== Schedule and results ==
Date time, TV	Rank^{#}	Opponent^{#}	Result	Record	Site (attendance) city, state
Exhibition
Oct 24, 2017*; 7:30 pm		Thiel	W 106–74		Beeghly Center; Youngstown, OH
Non-Conference regular season
Nov 11, 2017*; 9:00 pm, ESPN3		vs. Kent State; Northeast Ohio Coaches vs Cancer Doubleheader	L 78–111	0–1	James A. Rhodes Arena (2,434); Akron, OH
Nov 14, 2017*; 7:30 pm, ESPN3		Franciscan	W 134–46	1–1	Beeghly Center (4,104); Youngstown, OH
Nov 18, 2017*; 7:00 pm, ESPN3		at Canisius	L 84–104	1–2	Koessler Athletic Center (1,245); Buffalo, NY
Nov 21, 2017*; 7:00 pm, ESPN3		Westminster (PA); Sanford Pentagon Showcase	W 91–83	2–2	Beeghly Center (2,283); Youngstown, OH
Nov 24, 2017*; 9:00 pm		vs. Northern Colorado; Sanford Pentagon Showcase	L 67–80	2–3	Sanford Pentagon (1,105); Sioux Falls, SD
Nov 25, 2017*; 5:00 pm		vs. Southern Miss; Sanford Pentagon Showcase	W 71–64	2–4	Sanford Pentagon (343); Sioux Falls, SD
Nov 26, 2017*; 3:00 pm		vs. South Dakota; Sanford Pentagon Showcase	L 53–81	2–5	Sanford Pentagon (467); Sioux Falls, SD
Nov 29, 2017*; 7:00 pm, ESPN3		Robert Morris	L 74–81	2–6	Beeghly Center (1,786); Youngstown, OH
Dec 2, 2017*; 2:00 pm, FSN		at DePaul	L 73–89	2–7	Wintrust Arena (4,732); Chicago, IL
Dec 9, 2017*; 12:00 pm, FSN		at Butler	L 67–95	2–8	Hinkle Fieldhouse (8,022); Indianapolis, IN
Dec 18, 2017*; 8:00 pm		at Idaho State	L 62–86	2–9	Holt Arena (1,464); Pocatello, ID
Dec 20, 2017*; 8:00 pm		at Utah State	L 74–91	2–10	Smith Spectrum (6,054); Logan, UT
Dec 29, 2017*; 8:00 pm, BTN		at Indiana	L 51–79	2–11	Simon Skjodt Assembly Hall (14,122); Bloomington, IN
Horizon League regular season
Jan 1, 2018; 1:00 pm, ESPN3		at Cleveland State	W 80–77	3–11 (1–0)	Wolstein Center (1,221); Cleveland, OH
Jan 4, 2018; 7:30 pm, ESPN3		Milwaukee	W 72–63	4–11 (2–0)	Beeghly Center (1,484); Youngstown, OH
Jan 6, 2018; 7:00 pm, ESPN3		Green Bay	W 85–74	5–11 (3–0)	Beeghly Center (4,470); Youngstown, OH
Jan 10, 2018; 7:00 pm, ESPN3		at Oakland	L 82–95	5–12 (3–1)	Athletics Center O'rena (2,657); Rochester, MI
Jan 12, 2018; 7:00 pm, ESPN3		at Detroit	L 91–93	5–13 (3–2)	Calihan Hall (1,154); Detroit, MI
Jan 15, 2018; 4:00 pm, ESPN3		at Wright State	L 67–77	5–14 (3–3)	Nutter Center (4,409); Fairborn, OH
Jan 18, 2018; 7:00 pm, ESPN3		UIC	L 78–92	5–15 (3–4)	Beeghly Center (1,686); Youngstown, OH
Jan 20, 2018; 7:00 pm, ESPN3		IUPUI	W 85–62	6–15 (4–4)	Beeghly Center (3,222); Youngstown, OH
Jan 25, 2018; 8:00 pm, ESPN3		at Milwaukee	L 55–66	6–16 (4–5)	UW–Milwaukee Panther Arena (1,677); Milwaukee, WI
Jan 27, 2018; 4:00 pm, ESPN3		at Green Bay	L 67–85	6–17 (4–6)	Resch Center (2,992); Green Bay, WI
Feb 1, 2018; 7:00 pm, ESPN3		Northern Kentucky	L 85–95	6–18 (4–7)	Beeghly Center (1,391); Youngstown, OH
Feb 3, 2018; 7:00 pm, ESPN3		Wright State	L 57–83	6–19 (4–8)	Beeghly Center (5,371); Youngstown, OH
Feb 8, 2018; 8:00 pm, ESPN3		at UIC	L 75–100	6–20 (4–9)	UIC Pavilion (2,033); Chicago, IL
Feb 10, 2018; 1:00 pm, ESPN3		at IUPUI	W 84–80	7–20 (5–9)	Indiana Farmers Coliseum (905); Indianapolis, IN
Feb 14, 2018; 7:00 pm, ESPN3		Oakland	W 75–73	8–20 (6–9)	Beeghly Center (1,513); Youngstown, OH
Feb 16, 2018; 7:00 pm, ESPN3		Detroit	L 84–94	8–21 (6–10)	Beeghly Center (3,137); Youngstown, OH
Feb 19, 2018; 7:30 pm, ESPN3		at Northern Kentucky	L 51–70	8–22 (6–11)	BB&T Arena (4,001); Highland Heights, KY
Feb 24, 2018; 7:00 pm, ESPN3		Cleveland State	L 94–99 ^{2OT}	8–23 (6–12)	Beeghly Center (5,483); Youngstown, OH
Horizon League tournament
Mar 2, 2018; 8:00 pm, ESPN3	(9)	vs. (8) Cleveland State; First round	L 71–72	8–24	Little Caesars Arena (4,248); Detroit, MI
*Non-conference game. ^{#}Rankings from AP Poll. (#) Tournament seedings in parentheses. All times are in Eastern Time Source.
