= 2017–18 Green Bay Phoenix men's basketball team =

American college basketball season

2017–18 Green Bay Phoenix men's basketball
- Conference: Horizon League
- Record: 13–20 (7–11 Horizon)
- Head coach: Linc Darner (3rd season)
- Assistant coaches: Randall Herbst; Richard Davis; Ben Swank
- Home arena: Resch Center; Kress Events Center

2017–18 Horizon League men's basketball standings
	Conf.				Overall
Team	W		L	PCT	W		L	PCT
Northern Kentucky	15	–	3	.833	22	–	10	.688
Wright State †	14	–	4	.778	25	–	10	.714
UIC	12	–	6	.667	20	–	16	.556
Oakland	10	–	8	.556	19	–	14	.576
Milwaukee	8	–	10	.444	16	–	17	.485
IUPUI	8	–	10	.444	11	–	19	.367
Green Bay	7	–	11	.389	13	–	20	.394
Cleveland State	6	–	12	.333	12	–	23	.343
Youngstown State	6	–	12	.333	8	–	24	.250
Detroit	4	–	14	.222	8	–	24	.250
† 2018 Horizon League Tournament winner

The 2017–18 Green Bay Phoenix men's basketball team represented the University of Wisconsin–Green Bay in the 2017–18 NCAA Division I men's basketball season. The Phoenix, led by third-year head coach Linc Darner, played their home games at the Resch Center, with one home game at the Kress Events Center, as members of the Horizon League. They finished the season 13–20, 7–11 in to finish in seventh place. They defeated Detroit in the first round of the Horizon League tournament before losing in the quarterfinals to eventual Horizon League Tournament champion Wright State.

== Previous season ==
The Phoenix finished the 2016–17 season 18–14, 12–6 in Horizon League play to finish in a tie for third place. In the Horizon League tournament, they lost to UIC in the quarterfinals. They received an invitation to the College Basketball Invitational where they lost in the first round to UMKC.

== Offseason ==
=== Departures ===
Name	Number	Pos.	Height	Weight	Year	Hometown	Notes
Kerem Kanter	1	F	6'10"	240	Junior (redshirt)	Istanbul, Turkey	Graduate transferred to Xavier
Turner Botz	2	G	6'7"	215	Senior	Little Chute, WI	Graduated
Jamar Hurdle	23	F	6'7"	200	Senior	Milwaukee, WI	Graduated
Tevin Findlay	32	G	6'4"	190	Senior	Malton, Ontario	Graduated
Charles Cooper	34	G	6'4"	220	Senior	Gary, IN	Graduated
Kenneth Lowe	45	G	6'8"	230	Senior	Little Chute, WI	Graduated
Trevor Anderson	12	G	6'2"	180	Senior	Stevens Point, WI	transferred to Wisconsin

=== Recruiting class of 2017 ===
College recruiting information
Name	Hometown	School	Height	Weight	Commit date
Manny Patterson #64 PF	Chicago, IL	Kenwood Academy High School	6 ft 7 in (2.01 m)	N/A	
Manny Patterson #64 PF	Recruit ratings: Scout: Rivals: (75)				
Will Chevalier; PF	Kimberly, WI	Kimberly High School	6 ft 8 in (2.03 m)	200 lb (91 kg)	Jul 25, 2016
Will Chevalier; PF	Recruit ratings: Scout: Rivals: (NR)				
Trevian Bell; SF	Joliet, IL	Joliet High School	6 ft 5 in (1.96 m)	N/A	
Trevian Bell; SF	Recruit ratings: Scout: Rivals: (NR)				
P.J. Pipes; PG	Lemont, IL	Lemont High School	6 ft 2 in (1.88 m)	180 lb (82 kg)	Sep 16, 2016
P.J. Pipes; PG	Recruit ratings: Scout: Rivals: (NR)				
Overall recruit ranking:
Note: In many cases, Scout, Rivals, 247Sports, On3, and ESPN may conflict in their listings of height and weight.; In these cases, the average was taken. ESPN grades are on a 100-point scale.; Sources: "2017 Team Ranking". Rivals.

== Roster ==
2017–18 Green Bay Phoenix men's basketball team
Players
Coaches

Pos.	#	Name	Height	Weight	Year	Previous school	Hometown
F	0	TJ Parham	6 ft 7 in (2.01 m)	210 lb (95 kg)	RS So	Marian Catholic High School; Wabash Valley College	Chicago, Illinois
G	1	Sandy Cohen III	6 ft 6 in (1.98 m)	200 lb (91 kg)	RS Jr	Seymour Community High School; Marquette	Seymour, Wisconsin
G	2	PJ Pipes	6 ft 2 in (1.88 m)	195 lb (88 kg)	Fr	Lemont High School	Woodridge, Illinois
G	3	Khalil Small	6 ft 2 in (1.88 m)	215 lb (98 kg)	Sr	Providence St. Mel School	Chicago, Illinois
G	4	Simeon Parker (W)	5 ft 9 in (1.75 m)	170 lb (77 kg)	Fr	Madison West High School	Madison, Wisconsin
F	11	Sukhjot Bains	6 ft 6 in (1.98 m)	205 lb (93 kg)	Jr	Northwest College	Delta, British Columbia
G	13	Trevian Bell	6 ft 6 in (1.98 m)	220 lb (100 kg)	Fr	Joliet West High School	Joliet, Illinois
F	15	Manny Patterson	6 ft 8 in (2.03 m)	220 lb (100 kg)	Fr	Kenwood Academy	Chicago, Illinois
F	20	Tyrone Powell (W)	6 ft 5 in (1.96 m)	210 lb (95 kg)	Fr	Wauwatosa West High School	Wauwatosa, Wisconsin
F	21	Kameron Hankerson	6 ft 5 in (1.96 m)	200 lb (91 kg)	So	Novi High School	Novi, Michigan
G	30	Hunter Crist	6 ft 3 in (1.91 m)	190 lb (86 kg)	Fr	Don Bosco Preparatory High School	Crown Point, Indiana
G	33	Cody Schwartz	6 ft 8 in (2.03 m)	210 lb (95 kg)	Jr	West De Pere High School; San Jose State	De Pere, Wisconsin
F	34	Will Chevalier	6 ft 8 in (2.03 m)	225 lb (102 kg)	Fr	Kimberly High School	Kimberly, Wisconsin
F	42	David Jesperson	6 ft 8 in (2.03 m)	220 lb (100 kg)	RS Sr	Merrill High School; Pepperdine	Merrill, Wisconsin

Head coach

- Linc Darner (Purdue)

Assistant coach(es)

- Randall Herbst (Waldorf)
- Richard Davis (Ashland)
- Ben Swank (Edinboro)

Legend

- (C) Team captain
- (S) Suspended
- (I) Ineligible
- (W) Walk-on
- Injured
- Current redshirt

Roster
Last update: November 2, 2017

== Schedule and results ==
Date time, TV	Rank^{#}	Opponent^{#}	Result	Record	High points	High rebounds	High assists	Site (attendance) city, state
Exhibition
Oct. 30, 2017*; 7:00 pm		Ripon	W 100–70		15 – Hankerson/Pipes/Small	8 – Patterson	8 – Hankerson	Resch Center (1,835); Green Bay, WI
Nov. 5, 2017*; 12:00 pm, BTN Plus		at No. 15 Minnesota; ARC Hurricane Relief	L 86–115		20 – Small	10 – Small	6 – Small	Maturi Pavilion (2,381); Minneapolis, MN
Non-Conference regular season
Nov 14, 2017*; 7:00 pm, ESPN3		at Northern Illinois	L 65–85	0–1	13 – Small	10 – Small	4 – Hankerson	Convocation Center (858); DeKalb, IL
Nov 17, 2017*; 7:00 pm, ESPN3		Lakeland; Hoops In The Heartland	W 98–27	1–1	17 – Hankerson	12 – Small	6 – Small	Resch Center (2,156); Green Bay, WI
Nov 20, 2017*; 7:00 pm, SECN+		at Mississippi State; Hoops In The Heartland	L 68–77	1–2	15 – Parham/Small	7 – Small	5 – Crist	Humphrey Coliseum (6,359); Starkville, MS
Nov 24, 2017*; 6:00 pm, ESPN3		Florida A&M; Hoops In The Heartland	W 57–50	2–2	16 – Small	9 – Patterson	3 – Pipes/Small	Resch Center (2,239); Green Bay, WI
Nov 27, 2017*; 7:00 pm, ESPN3		Stetson; Hoops In The Heartland	L 71–83	2–3	19 – Small	6 – Jesperson/Small	4 – Hankerson	Resch Center (1,836); Green Bay, WI
Dec 2, 2017*; 1:00 pm		at Belmont	L 75–86	2–4	16 – Hankerson/Jesperson	7 – Hankerson	7 – Small	Curb Event Center (1,086); Nashville, TN
Dec 6, 2017*; 7:00 pm, ESPN3		Eastern Illinois	W 59–57	3–4	20 – Small	5 – Jesperson	5 – Parham	Resch Center (1,925); Green Bay, WI
Dec 9, 2017*; 8:00 pm, SECN		at Missouri	L 77–100	3–5	17 – Jesperson	7 – Parham	3 – Hankerson/Small	Mizzou Arena (15,061); Columbia, MO
Dec 12, 2017*; 6:00 pm, ESPN3		at Indiana State	L 63–85	3–6	15 – Small	6 – Small	2 – Bains/Hankerson/Small	Hulman Arena (2,924); Terre Haute, IN
Dec 16, 2017*; 6:00 pm		Wisconsin–Parkside	W 86–50	4–6	16 – Crist	7 – Crist	4 – Hankerson/Pipes	Resch Center (2,458); Green Bay, WI
Dec 18, 2017*; 7:00 pm, ESPN3		Rockford	W 108–64	5–6	29 – Small	9 – Patterson	8 – Pipes	Resch Center (1,913); Green Bay, WI
Dec 21, 2017*; 6:00 pm, SPEC		Bowling Green	L 78–81 ^{OT}	5–7	19 – Small	9 – Small	4 – Bains/Pipes	Resch Center (2,973); Green Bay, WI
Dec 23, 2017*; 4:30 pm, BTN		at Wisconsin	L 60–81	5–8	13 – Cohen	4 – Jesperson	3 – Cohen/Crist	Kohl Center (17,287); Madison, WI
Horizon League regular season
Dec 28, 2017; 7:00 pm, ESPN3		Detroit	W 95–83	6–9 (1–0)	24 – Cohen	8 – Small	6 – Small	Resch Center (2,284); Green Bay, WI
Dec 30, 2017; 12:00 pm, ESPN3		Oakland	W 80–79	7–9 (2–0)	19 – Hankerson	12 – Cohen	4 – Cohen/Small	Resch Center (2,683); Green Bay, WI
Jan 2, 2018; 7:00 pm, ESPN3		IUPUI	L 63–67	7–9 (2–1)	18 – Small	6 – Cohen	2 – 6 Players Tied	Resch Center (1,932); Green Bay, WI
Jan 4, 2018; 6:00 pm, ESPN3		at Cleveland State	L 79–80	7–10 (2–2)	30 – Small	9 – Small	3 – 4 Players Tied	Wolstein Center (1,095); Cleveland, OH
Jan 6, 2018; 6:00 pm, ESPN3		at Youngstown State	L 74–85	7–11 (2–3)	27 – Cohen	7 – Bains	3 – Bains	Beeghly Center (4,470); Youngstown, OH
Jan 10, 2018; 6:00 pm, ESPN3		at UIC	L 73–84	7–12 (2–4)	27 – Small	9 – Small	9 – Hankerson	UIC Pavilion (1,595); Chicago, IL
Jan 12, 2018; 6:00 pm, ESPN3		at IUPUI	L 61–67	7–13 (2–5)	16 – Hankerson	8 – Patterson	3 – Hankerson	Indiana Farmers Coliseum (827); Indianapolis, IN
Jan 15, 2018; 7:00 pm, ESPN3		Milwaukee	W 99–92 ^{OT}	8–13 (3–5)	29 – Cohen	14 – Patterson	5 – Pipes/Small	Resch Center (2,630); Green Bay, WI
Jan 18, 2018; 7:00 pm, ESPN3		Wright State	W 80–67	8–14 (3–6)	20 – Small	8 – Small	5 – Small	Resch Center (2,264); Green Bay, WI
Jan 20, 2018; 12:00 pm, ESPN3		Northern Kentucky	L 65–77	8–15 (3–7)	17 – Small	8 – Small	4 – Small	Resch Center (3,119); Green Bay, WI
Jan 25, 2018; 7:00 pm, ESPN3		Cleveland State	W 66–44	9–15 (4–7)	25 – Small	13 – Patterson	3 – Pipes	Resch Center (2,325); Green Bay, WI
Jan 27, 2018; 12:00 pm, ESPN3		Youngstown State	W 85–67	10–15 (5–7)	27 – Small	7 – Small	4 – Small	Resch Center (2,992); Green Bay, WI
Feb 2, 2018; 7:00 pm, ESPN3		at Milwaukee	L 58–76	10–16 (5–8)	13 – Patterson	9 – Patterson	3 – Cohen	UW–Milwaukee Panther Arena (1,973); Milwaukee, WI
Feb 8, 2018; 6:30 pm, ESPN3		at Wright State	L 64–68	10–17 (5–9)	21 – Cohen	10 – Cohen	4 – Small	Nutter Center (4,714); Fairborn, OH
Feb 10, 2018; 6:00 pm, ESPN3		at Northern Kentucky	L 80–86	10–18 (5–10)	20 – Small	7 – Cohen	7 – Hankerson	BB&T Arena (6,455); Highland Heights, KY
Feb 16, 2018; 8:00 pm, ESPN3		UIC	L 75–83	10–19 (5–11)	25 – Cohen	7 – Cohen/Jesperson	4 – Hankerson/Small	Kress Events Center (3,872); Green Bay, WI
Feb 22, 2018; 6:00 pm, ESPN3		at Oakland	W 96–90	11–19 (6–11)	36 – Cohen	11 – Cohen	5 – Cohen	Athletics Center O'rena (3,211); Rochester, MI
Feb 24, 2018; 1:00 pm, ESPN3		at Detroit	W 107–97	12–19 (7–11)	31 – Cohen	10 – Small	5 – Cohen	Calihan Hall (1,547); Detroit, MI
Horizon League tournament
Mar 2, 2018; 5:30 pm, ESPN3	(7)	vs. (10) Detroit; First round	W 93–81	13–19	36 – Hankerson	11 – Cohen	6 – Cohen	Little Caesars Arena (4,248); Detroit, MI
Mar 3, 2018; 5:30 pm, ESPN3	(7)	vs. (2) Wright State; Quarterfinals	L 72–87	13–20	34 – Small	11 – Small	6 – Small	Little Caesars Arena (6,276); Detroit, MI
*Non-conference game. ^{#}Rankings from AP Poll. (#) Tournament seedings in parentheses. All times are in Central Time.
