= Dražen Zlovarić =

Serbian professional basketball coach and former player

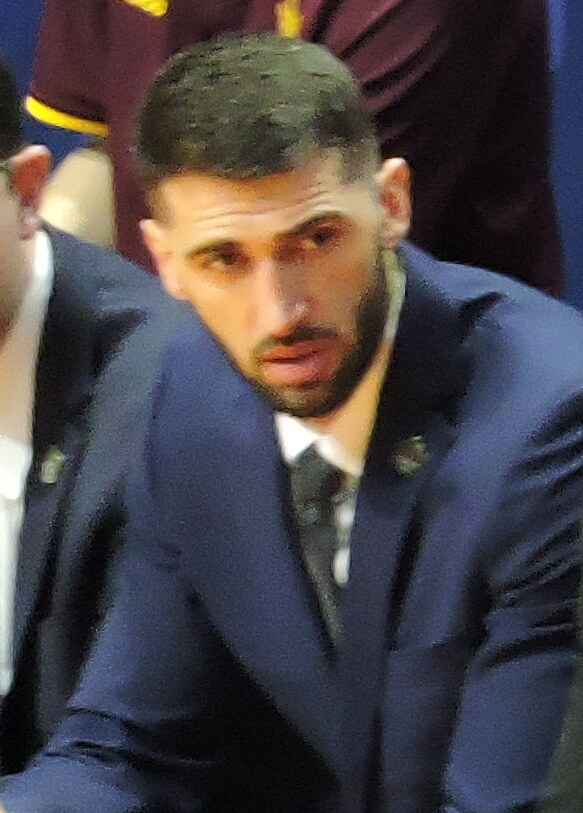
- Zlovarić in 2019

Personal information
- Born: 23 March 1989 (age 37) Osijek, SR Croatia, SFR Yugoslavia
- Listed height: 2.07 m (6 ft 9 in)
- Listed weight: 99 kg (218 lb)

Career information
- High school: Cleveland (Cleveland, Tennessee)
- College: Georgia (2008–2010); Chattanooga (2011–2013)
- NBA draft: 2013: undrafted
- Playing career: 2013–2015
- Position: Power forward
- Coaching career: 2017–2019

Career history

Playing
- 2013: Best Balıkesir
- 2013: Zepter Vienna
- 2014–2015: Igokea

Coaching
- 2017–2018: Cleveland State (assistant)
- 2018–2019: Arizona State (assistant)

Career highlights
- As Player: Bosnian and Herzegovinan League champion (2015); Bosnian and Herzegovinan Cup champion (2015); Austrian League champion (2013)

Dražen Zlovarić (Serbian Cyrillic: Дражен Зловарић, born 23 March 1989) is a Serbian former professional basketball player and coach who played as a power forward. He worked as an assistant coach for the Arizona State Sun Devils.

== Playing career ==
Zlovarić played university basketball at the University of Georgia and the University of Tennessee at Chattanooga. After returning to Europe, he had stints with Best Balıkesir, Zepter Vienna, and Igokea.

On 19 March 2015, it was announced that Zlovarić decided to finish his playing career and concentrate on continuing his studies and pursuing a career outside professional basketball.

== Coaching career ==
On 9 May 2017, Zlovarić was announced as an assistant coach on Cleveland State University's men's basketball staff under head coach Dennis Felton.

In September 2018, Zlovarić was hired by Arizona State to be assistant coach under head coach Bobby Hurley.
