= 2018–19 Mid-American Conference men's basketball season =

Basketball season in NCAA Division I

2018–19 Mid–American Conference men's basketball season
- League: NCAA Division I
- Sport: Basketball
- Duration: November 2018 through March 2019
- Teams: 12
- TV partner(s): ESPN+, ESPN, ESPN3, CBSSN

Regular Season
- Champion: Buffalo
- Season MVP: C. J. Massinburg, Buffalo

Tournament
- Champions: Buffalo
- Runners-up: Bowling Green
- Finals MVP: Jeremy Harris

Mid–American Conference men's basketball seasons
- 2017–18 2019–20

2018–19 Mid-American Conference men's basketball standings
	Conf.				Overall
Team	W		L	PCT	W		L	PCT
East
No. 15 Buffalo †	16	–	2	.889	32	–	4	.889
Bowling Green	12	–	6	.667	22	–	12	.647
Kent State	11	–	7	.611	22	–	11	.667
Akron	8	–	10	.444	17	–	16	.515
Miami (OH)	7	–	11	.389	15	–	17	.469
Ohio	6	–	12	.333	14	–	17	.452
West
Toledo	13	–	5	.722	25	–	8	.758
Central Michigan	10	–	8	.556	23	–	12	.657
Eastern Michigan	9	–	9	.500	15	–	17	.469
Northern Illinois	8	–	10	.444	17	–	17	.500
Ball State	6	–	12	.333	16	–	17	.485
Western Michigan	2	–	16	.111	8	–	24	.250
† 2019 MAC tournament winner Rankings from AP Poll

The 2018–19 Mid-American Conference men's basketball season began with practices in October 2018, followed by the start of the 2018–19 NCAA Division I men's basketball season in November. Conference play began in January 2019 and concluded in March 2019. The season marked the 76th season of Mid–American Conference basketball.

== Preseason ==
In the preseason, Buffalo, which returned five of its six leading scorers from a team that defeated Arizona Wildcats men's basketball in the NCAA tournament, was discussed as a team that could potentially make a "Cinderalla run" in the NCAA Tournament.

The preseason poll and league awards were announced by the league office on October 30, 2019.

=== Preseason men's basketball poll ===
(First place votes in parentheses)

==== East Division ====
1. Buffalo 210 (35)
2. Miami 127
3. Kent State 122
4. Ohio 121
5. Akron 97
6. Bowling Green 58

==== West Division ====
1. Eastern Michigan 183 (17)
2. Ball State 175 (11)
3. Toledo 156 (5)
4. Western Michigan 81 (1)
5. Northern Illinois 73
6. Central Michigan 67 (1)

==== Tournament Champs ====
Buffalo (25), Eastern Michigan (3), Toledo (3), Central Michigan (1), Miami (1), Northern Illinois (1), Western Michigan (1)

=== Honors ===
Honor	Recipient
Preseason All-MAC East	Demajeo Wiggins, Sr., Forward, Bowling Green
Preseason All-MAC East	C.J. Massinburg, Sr., Guard, Buffalo
Preseason All-MAC East	Jeremy Harris, Sr., Guard, Buffalo
Preseason All-MAC East	Nick Perkins, Sr., Forward, Buffalo
Preseason All-MAC East	Jaylin Walker, Sr., Guard, Kent State
Preseason All-MAC West	Tayler Persons, Sr., Guard, Ball State
Preseason All-MAC West	James Thompson IV, Sr., Forward/Center, Eastern Michigan
Preseason All-MAC West	Elijah Minnie, Sr., Forward, Eastern Michigan
Preseason All-MAC West	Eugene German, Jr., Guard, Northern Illinois
Preseason All-MAC West	Jaelan Sanford, Sr., Guard, Toledo

== Regular season ==
=== Conference matrix ===
This table summarizes the head-to-head results between teams in conference play.

	Akron	Ball St	BGSU	Buffalo	CMU	EMU	Kent St	Miami	N. Illinois	Ohio	Toledo	WMU
vs. Akron	–	1–0	1–1	2–0	1–1	0–1	–1	1–1	1–1	1–1	1–0	0–1
vs. Ball St.	0–1	–	1–0	1–0	1–1	2–0	1–0	2–0	1–1	2–0	1–1	0–2
vs. BGSU	1–1	0–1	–	1–1	0–2	0–1	0–	2–0	0–1	1–1	1–0	0–2
vs. Buffalo	0–2	0–1	1–1	–	0–1	0–2	0–2	0–2	1–0	0–2	0–2	0–1
vs. CMU	1–1	1–1	2–0	1–0	–	0–2	0–1	0–1	1–1	0–1	2–0	0–2
vs. EMU	1–0	0–2	1–0	2–0	2–0	–	1–1	1–0	0–2	0–1	1–1	0–2
vs. Kent St.	1–1	0–1	2–0	2–0	1–0	1–1	–	0–2	0–1	0–2	0–1	0–2
vs. Miami	1–1	0–2	0–2	2–0	1–0	0–1	2–0	–	1–0	1–1	2–0	1–0
vs. N. Illinois	1–1	1–1	1–0	0–1	1–1	2–0	1–0	0–1	–	0–2	2–0	1–1
vs. Ohio	1–1	0–2	1–1	2–0	1–0	1–0	2–0	1–1	2–0	–	1–0	0–1
vs. Toledo	0–1	1–1	0–1	2–0	0–2	1–1	1–0	0–2	0–2	0–1	–	0–2
vs. WMU	1–0	2–0	2–0	1–0	2–0	2–0	2–0	0–1	1–1	1–0	2–0	–
Total	8–10	6–12	12–6	16–2	10–8	9–9	11–7	7–11	8–10	6–12	13–5	2–16

== Awards and honors ==
=== Honors ===
Honor	Recipient
All-MAC First Team	Justin Turner, G, Bowling Green, R-So.
All-MAC First Team	C.J. Massinburg, G, Buffalo, Sr.
All-MAC First Team	Nick Perkins, F, Buffalo, Sr.
All-MAC First Team	Jaylin Walker, G, Kent State, Sr.
All-MAC First Team	Jaelan Sanford, G, Toledo, Sr.
All-MAC Second Team	Demajeo Wiggins, F, Bowling Green, Sr.
All-MAC Second Team	Jeremy Harris, G, Buffalo, Sr.
All-MAC Second Team	Larry Austin Jr., G, Central Michigan, Sr.
All-MAC Second Team	James Thompson IV, F/C, Eastern Michigan, Sr.
All-MAC Second Team	Eugene German, G, Northern Illinois, Jr.
All-MAC Third Team	Tayler Persons, G, Ball State, R-Sr.
All-MAC Third Team	Shawn Roundtree Jr., G, Central Michigan, Sr.
All-MAC Third Team	Nike Sibande, G, Miami, So.
All-MAC Third Team	Jason Carter, F, Ohio, R-So.
All-MAC Third Team	Seth Dugan, C, Western Michigan, Sr.
All-MAC Honorable Mention	Daniel Utomi, F, Akron, Jr.
All-MAC Honorable Mention	Paul Jackson, G, Eastern Michigan, R-Sr.
All-MAC Honorable Mention	Elijah Minnie F, Eastern Michigan, R-Sr.
All-MAC Honorable Mention	Nate Navigato, F, Toledo, Sr.
All-MAC Honorable Mention	Marreon Jackson, G, Toledo, So.
All-MAC Freshman Team	Anthony Roberts, G, Kent State, Fr.
All-MAC Freshman Team	Mekhi Lairy, G, Miami, Fr.
All-MAC Freshman Team	Ben Vander Plas, F, Ohio, Fr.
All-MAC Freshman Team	Jason Preston, G, Ohio, Fr.
All-MAC Freshman Team	AJ Edu, F, Toledo, Fr.
All-MAC Defensive Team	Dontay Caruthers, G, Buffalo, Sr.
All-MAC Defensive Team	Davonta Jordan, G, Buffalo, Jr.
All-MAC Defensive Team	Larry Austin Jr., G, Central Michigan, Sr.
All-MAC Defensive Team	James Thompson IV, F/C, Eastern Michigan, Sr.
All-MAC Defensive Team	Darrian Ringo, G, Miami, Sr.

== See also ==
2018–19 Mid-American Conference women's basketball season
