= 2018–19 Ball State Cardinals men's basketball team =

American college basketball season

2018–19 Ball State Cardinals men's basketball
- Conference: Mid-American Conference
- West Division
- Record: 16–17 (6–12 MAC)
- Head coach: James Whitford (6th season)
- Assistant coaches: Jason Grunkemeyer; Ben Botts (1st season); Matt Crenshaw
- Home arena: Worthen Arena

2018–19 Mid-American Conference men's basketball standings
	Conf.				Overall
Team	W		L	PCT	W		L	PCT
East
No. 15 Buffalo †	16	–	2	.889	32	–	4	.889
Bowling Green	12	–	6	.667	22	–	12	.647
Kent State	11	–	7	.611	22	–	11	.667
Akron	8	–	10	.444	17	–	16	.515
Miami (OH)	7	–	11	.389	15	–	17	.469
Ohio	6	–	12	.333	14	–	17	.452
West
Toledo	13	–	5	.722	25	–	8	.758
Central Michigan	10	–	8	.556	23	–	12	.657
Eastern Michigan	9	–	9	.500	15	–	17	.469
Northern Illinois	8	–	10	.444	17	–	17	.500
Ball State	6	–	12	.333	16	–	17	.485
Western Michigan	2	–	16	.111	8	–	24	.250
† 2019 MAC tournament winner Rankings from AP Poll

The 2018–19 Ball State Cardinals men's basketball team represented Ball State University during the 2018–19 NCAA Division I men's basketball season. The Cardinals, led by sixth-year head coach James Whitford, played their home games at Worthen Arena as members of the West Division of the Mid-American Conference. They finished the season 16–17, 6–12 in MAC play to finish in fifth place in the West Division. They defeated Eastern Michigan in the first round of the MAC tournament before losing in the quarterfinals to Bowling Green.

== Previous season ==
The Cardinals finished the 2017–18 season 19–13, 10–8 to finish in third place in the MAC West division. They lost in the quarterfinals of the MAC tournament to Kent State.

== Offseason ==
=== Departures ===
Name	Number	Pos.	Height	Weight	Year	Hometown	Reason for departure
Francis Kiapway	0	G	6'3"	190	Senior	Hamilton, ON	Graduated
Jontrell Walker	1	G	6'1'	182	RS Junior	Aurora, IL	Graduate transferred to Jackson State
Tyler Leedy	11	G	6'0"	146	Freshman	Zionsville, IN	Walk-on; left the team for personal reasons
Sean Sellers	34	G/F	6'6"	216	Senior	Greensburg, IN	Graduated

=== Incoming transfers ===
Name	Number	Pos.	Height	Weight	Year	Hometown	Previous School
Miryne Thomas	1	F	6'8"	190	Sophomore	Cleveland, OH	Transferred from Maryland Eastern Shore. Under NCAA transfer rules, Thomas will have to sit out for the 2018–19 season. Will have three years of remaining eligibility.
Austin Nehls	20	G	6'3"	185	Senior	Tucson, AZ	Transferred from Central Connecticut. Will be eligible to play immediately since Nehls graduated from Central Connecticut.

=== Recruiting class of 2018 ===
College recruiting information
Name	Hometown	School	Height	Weight	Commit date
Jarron Coleman; SG	Indianapolis, IN	Cathedral High School	6 ft 5 in (1.96 m)	190 lb (86 kg)	Apr 26, 2017
Jarron Coleman; SG	Recruit ratings: Scout: Rivals: 247Sports: (NR)				
Kani Acree; SF	Carbondale, IL	Carbondale Community High School	6 ft 6 in (1.98 m)	190 lb (86 kg)	Jul 13, 2017
Kani Acree; SF	Recruit ratings: Scout: Rivals: 247Sports: (NR)				
Overall recruit ranking:
Note: In many cases, Scout, Rivals, 247Sports, On3, and ESPN may conflict in their listings of height and weight.; In these cases, the average was taken. ESPN grades are on a 100-point scale.; Sources: "2018 Team Ranking". Rivals.

=== Recruiting class of 2019 ===
College recruiting information (2019)
Name	Hometown	School	Height	Weight	Commit date
Lucas Kroft; SG	Fort Wayne, IN	North Side High School	6 ft 5 in (1.96 m)	195 lb (88 kg)	Jun 22, 2018
Lucas Kroft; SG	Recruit ratings: Scout: Rivals: 247Sports: (NR)				
Luke Bumbalough; SG	New Castle, IN	New Castle High School	6 ft 5 in (1.96 m)	195 lb (88 kg)	Jun 24, 2018
Luke Bumbalough; SG	Recruit ratings: Scout: Rivals: 247Sports: (NR)				
Overall recruit ranking:
Note: In many cases, Scout, Rivals, 247Sports, On3, and ESPN may conflict in their listings of height and weight.; In these cases, the average was taken. ESPN grades are on a 100-point scale.; Sources: "2019 Team Ranking". Rivals.

== Roster ==
2018–19 Ball State Cardinals men's basketball team
Players
Coaches

Pos.	#	Name	Height	Weight	Year	Previous school	Hometown
F	0	Miryne Thomas (redshirt)	6 ft 8 in (2.03 m)	199 lb (90 kg)	So	Central Catholic; Maryland Eastern Shore	Cleveland, OH
G	1	K. J. Walton	6 ft 3 in (1.91 m)	200 lb (91 kg)	RS Jr	Brownsburg; Missouri	Indianapolis, IN
G	2	Tayler Persons	6 ft 3 in (1.91 m)	196 lb (89 kg)	RS Sr	Kokomo; Northern Kentucky	Kokomo, IN
G	3	Josh Thompson (W)	6 ft 0 in (1.83 m)	194 lb (88 kg)	RS Jr	Lawrence North	Indianapolis, IN
G	5	Ishmael El-Amin	6 ft 1 in (1.85 m)	195 lb (88 kg)	So	Hopkins	Minneapolis, MN
G	11	Jarron Coleman	6 ft 5 in (1.96 m)	208 lb (94 kg)	Fr	Cathedral	Indianapolis, IN
F	12	Brachen Hazen	6 ft 8 in (2.03 m)	211 lb (96 kg)	RS So	Columbia City; Arkansas	Columbia City, IN
G/F	13	Kani Acree	6 ft 6 in (1.98 m)	205 lb (93 kg)	Fr	Carbondale Community	Carbondale, IL
F	14	Kyle Mallers	6 ft 7 in (2.01 m)	217 lb (98 kg)	Jr	Carroll	Fort Wayne, IN
F	15	Zach Gunn	6 ft 6 in (1.98 m)	210 lb (95 kg)	So	Hamilton Southeastern	Fishers, IN
G	20	Austin Nehls	6 ft 3 in (1.91 m)	182 lb (83 kg)	Sr	Cheshire Academy; Central Connecticut State	Tucson, AZ
C	24	Trey Moses	6 ft 9 in (2.06 m)	245 lb (111 kg)	Sr	Eastern	Louisville, KY
F	25	Tahjai Teague	6 ft 8 in (2.03 m)	215 lb (98 kg)	RS Jr	Pike	Indianapolis, IN
C	44	Blake Huggins	6 ft 10 in (2.08 m)	245 lb (111 kg)	RS Fr	Obion County Central	Union City, TN

Head coach

- James Whitford (Wisconsin)

Assistant coach(es)

- Jason Grunkemeyer (Miami (OH))
- Ben Botts (Purdue Fort Wayne)
- Matt Crenshaw (IUPUI)

Legend

- (C) Team captain
- (S) Suspended
- (I) Ineligible
- (W) Walk-on
- Injured
- Current redshirt

Roster

== Schedule and results ==
Date time, TV	Rank^{#}	Opponent^{#}	Result	Record	Site (attendance) city, state
Exhibition
Nov 2, 2018*; 7:00 pm		Indianapolis	W 92–76		Worthen Arena (3,214); Muncie, IN
Non-conference regular season
Nov 6, 2018*; 7:00 pm, ESPN+		Indiana State	W 86–69	1–0	Worthen Arena (4,022); Muncie, IN
Nov 10, 2018*; 8:00 pm, BTN		at No. 24 Purdue; Charleston Classic non-bracket game	L 75–84	1–1	Mackey Arena (14,804); West Lafayette, IN
Nov 15, 2018*; 11:30 am, ESPN2		vs. No. 16 Virginia Tech; Charleston Classic quarterfinals	L 64–73	1–2	TD Arena (2,648); Charleston, SC
Nov 16, 2018*; 1:30 pm, ESPNU		vs. Alabama; Charleston Classic consolation 2nd round	L 61–79	1–3	TD Arena (2,752); Charleston, SC
Nov 18, 2018*; 11:00 am, ESPN3		vs. Appalachian State; Charleston Classic 7th place game	W 94–86 ^{OT}	2–3	TD Arena (2,862); Charleston, SC
Nov 24, 2018*; 2:00 pm, ESPN3		Evansville	W 82–72	3–3	Worthen Arena (3,224); Muncie, IN
Nov 27, 2018*; 7:00 pm, ESPN+		Tiffin	W 108–62	4–3	Worthen Arena (3,609); Muncie, IN
Dec 1, 2018*; 1:00 pm, ESPN3		at IUPUI	W 85–75	5–3	Indiana Farmers Coliseum (2,150); Indianapolis, IN
Dec 5, 2018*; 9:00 pm, NBCSCH/ESPN+		at Loyola–Chicago	W 75-69	6-3	Joseph J. Gentile Arena (2,831); Chicago, IL
Dec 9, 2018*; 3:00 pm, ESPN+		at Evansville	L 77-89	6-4	Ford Center (5,672); Evansville, IN
Dec 17, 2018*; 8:00 pm, ESPN+		at Valparaiso	W 77-61	7-4	Athletics–Recreation Center (3,636); Valparaiso, IN
Dec 20, 2018*; 7:00 pm, ESPN+		Howard	W 98–71	8–4	Worthen Arena (3,324); Muncie, IN
Dec 29, 2018*; 2:00 pm, ESPN3		Delaware State	W 116–57	9–4	Worthen Arena (3,424); Muncie, IN
MAC regular season
Jan 4, 2019; 7:00 pm, CBSSN		at Toledo	W 79–64	10–4 (1–0)	Savage Arena (5,023); Toledo, OH
Jan 8, 2019; 7:00 pm, ESPN+		Eastern Michigan	W 84–82 ^{2OT}	10–5 (1–1)	Worthen Arena (4,248); Muncie, IN
Jan 12, 2019; 12:00 pm, ESPN+		Ohio	W 70–52	10–6 (1–2)	Worthen Arena (4,076); Muncie, IN
Jan 15, 2019; 7:00 pm, ESPN+		at Bowling Green	W 79–78	10–7 (1–3)	Stroh Center (1,507); Bowling Green, OH
Jan 19, 2019; 4:30 pm, ESPN3		at Central Michigan	W 83–72	11–7 (2–3)	McGuirk Arena (2,204); Mount Pleasant, MI
Jan 22, 2019; 7:00 pm, ESPN+		Miami (OH)	W 71–65	11–8 (2–4)	Worthen Arena (3,742); Muncie, IN
Jan 26, 2019; 2:00 pm, ESPN3		at Ohio	L 74–78	11–9 (2–5)	Convocation Center (6,556); Athens, OH
Jan 29, 2019; 7:00 pm, ESPN3		at No. 18 Buffalo	L 59–83	11–10 (2–6)	Alumni Arena (4,747); Amherst, NY
Feb 2, 2019; 12:00 pm, CBSSN		Kent State	W 83–80 ^{OT}	11–11 (2–7)	Worthen Arena (4,024); Muncie, IN
Feb 5, 2019; 8:00 pm, ESPN+		at Northern Illinois	W 72–71	12–11 (3–7)	Convocation Center (462); DeKalb, IL
Feb 9, 2019; 2:00 pm, ESPN+		Western Michigan	W 79–59	13–11 (4–7)	Worthen Arena (4,312); Muncie, IN
Feb 16, 2019; 2:00 pm, ESPN3		Akron	W 57–56	14–11 (5–7)	Worthen Arena (4,577); Muncie, IN
Feb 19, 2019; 7:00 pm, ESPN+		at Miami (OH)	W 69–66	14–12 (5–8)	Millett Hall (1,871); Oxford, OH
Feb 23, 2019; 2:00 pm, ESPN+		Central Michigan	L 57–64	14–13 (5–9)	Worthen Arena (4,834); Muncie, IN
Feb 26, 2019; 7:00 pm, ESPN+		Toledo	L 72–80	14–14 (5–10)	Worthen Arena (4,691); Muncie, IN
Mar 2, 2019; 4:00 pm, ESPN+		at Western Michigan	W 60–58	15–14 (6–10)	University Arena (2,441); Kalamazoo, MI
Mar 5, 2019; 7:00 pm, ESPN+		at Eastern Michigan	L 61–68	15–15 (6–11)	Convocation Center (1,780); Ypsilanti, MI
Mar 8, 2019; 7:00 pm, ESPN+		Northern Illinois	W 64–57	15–16 (6–12)	Worthen Arena (5,524); Muncie, IN
MAC tournament
Mar 11, 2019; 7:00 pm, ESPN+	(11)	at (6) Eastern Michigan; First Round	W 61–43	16–16	Convocation Center (1,265); Ypsilanti, MI
Mar 14, 2019; 9:00 pm, ESPN+	(11)	vs. (3) Bowling Green; Quarterfinals	L 86–99	16–17	Quicken Loans Arena (2,499); Cleveland, OH
*Non-conference game. ^{#}Rankings from AP Poll. (#) Tournament seedings in parentheses. All times are in Eastern Time Source.

== See also ==
- 2018–19 Ball State Cardinals women's basketball team
