= 2018–19 Northern Illinois Huskies men's basketball team =

American college basketball season

2018–19 Northern Illinois Huskies men's basketball

Oakland Hoops Challenge champions
- Conference: Mid-American Conference
- West Division
- Record: 17–17 (8–10 MAC)
- Head coach: Mark Montgomery (8th season)
- Associate head coach: Jon Borovich
- Assistant coaches: Lamar Chapman; Brandon Watkins
- Home arena: Convocation Center

2018–19 Mid-American Conference men's basketball standings
	Conf.				Overall
Team	W		L	PCT	W		L	PCT
East
No. 15 Buffalo †	16	–	2	.889	32	–	4	.889
Bowling Green	12	–	6	.667	22	–	12	.647
Kent State	11	–	7	.611	22	–	11	.667
Akron	8	–	10	.444	17	–	16	.515
Miami (OH)	7	–	11	.389	15	–	17	.469
Ohio	6	–	12	.333	14	–	17	.452
West
Toledo	13	–	5	.722	25	–	8	.758
Central Michigan	10	–	8	.556	23	–	12	.657
Eastern Michigan	9	–	9	.500	15	–	17	.469
Northern Illinois	8	–	10	.444	17	–	17	.500
Ball State	6	–	12	.333	16	–	17	.485
Western Michigan	2	–	16	.111	8	–	24	.250
† 2019 MAC tournament winner Rankings from AP Poll

The 2018–19 Northern Illinois Huskies men's basketball team represented Northern Illinois University during the 2018–19 NCAA Division I men's basketball season. The Huskies were led by eighth-year head coach Mark Montgomery, and played their home games at the Convocation Center in DeKalb, Illinois as members of the West Division of the Mid-American Conference (MAC). They finished the season 17–17 overall, 8–10 in MAC play, to finish in fourth place in the West Division. As the No. 7 seed in the MAC tournament, they advanced to the semifinals, where they lost to Bowling Green.

== Previous season ==
The Huskies finished the 2017–18 season 13–19, 6–12 in MAC play, to finish in last place in the West Division. They lost in the first round of the MAC tournament to Kent State.

== Offseason ==
=== Departures ===
Name	Number	Pos.	Height	Weight	Year	Hometown	Reason for departure
Marlo Brown	3	G	6'5"	200	Freshman	Southfield, MI	Transferred to Tyler JC
Andrew Zelis	32	C	7'0"	255	RS Senior	Wheaton, IL	Graduated
Owen Hamilton	33	C	7'0"	2255	Freshman	Prescott, WI	Transferred to Wisconsin

=== Incoming transfers ===
Name	Number	Pos.	Height	Weight	Year	Hometown	Previous school
Zaire Mateen	5	G	6'0"	165	Sophomore	Queens, NY	Junior college transferred from Laramie County CC
Alize Travis	21	G	6'1"	175	Junior	Victorville, CA	Junior college transferred Pima CC

=== 2018 recruiting class ===
College recruiting information
Name	Hometown	School	Height	Weight	Commit date
Austin Richie; SF	Chicago Heights, IL	Bosco Institute	6 ft 6 in (1.98 m)	225 lb (102 kg)	Aug 3, 2017
Austin Richie; SF	Recruit ratings: Scout: Rivals: (NR)				
Justin Lee; SF	Lawrenceville, GA	Collins Hill High School	6 ft 8 in (2.03 m)	180 lb (82 kg)	Oct 11, 2017
Justin Lee; SF	Recruit ratings: Scout: Rivals: 247Sports: (NR)				
Overall recruit ranking:
Note: In many cases, Scout, Rivals, 247Sports, On3, and ESPN may conflict in their listings of height and weight.; In these cases, the average was taken. ESPN grades are on a 100-point scale.; Sources: "2018 Team Ranking". Rivals.

=== 2019 recruiting class ===
College recruiting information (2019)
Name	Hometown	School	Height	Weight	Commit date
Tyler Cochran; PG	Bolingbrook, IL	Bolingbrook High School	6 ft 1 in (1.85 m)	195 lb (88 kg)	Sep 14, 2018
Tyler Cochran; PG	Recruit ratings: Scout: Rivals: (NR)				
Keenon Cole; PF	Streamwood, IL	Streamwood High School	6 ft 7 in (2.01 m)	N/A	Jun 29, 2018
Keenon Cole; PF	Recruit ratings: Scout: Rivals: (NR)				
Overall recruit ranking:
Note: In many cases, Scout, Rivals, 247Sports, On3, and ESPN may conflict in their listings of height and weight.; In these cases, the average was taken. ESPN grades are on a 100-point scale.; Sources: "2019 Team Ranking". Rivals.

== Roster ==
2018–19 Northern Illinois Huskies men's basketball team
Players
Coaches

Pos.	#	Name	Height	Weight	Year	Previous school	Hometown
G	0	Dante Thorpe	6 ft 4 in (1.93 m)	195 lb (88 kg)	Sr	Friendship Collegiate Academy; Triton College	Washington, D.C.
G	1	Trendon Hankerson (W)	6 ft 2 in (1.88 m)	185 lb (84 kg)	Fr	Novi	Novi, MI
G	2	Gairges Daow	6 ft 4 in (1.93 m)	190 lb (86 kg)	So	Victory Rock Academy	Melbourne, Australia
G/F	3	Justin Lee	6 ft 8 in (2.03 m)	210 lb (95 kg)	Fr	Collins Hill	Lawrenceville, GA
F	4	Lacey James	6 ft 9 in (2.06 m)	240 lb (109 kg)	RS Jr	Wayland Union; Rider	Grand Rapids, MI
G	5	Zaire Mateen	6 ft 0 in (1.83 m)	170 lb (77 kg)	So	South Shore; Laramie County CC	Queens, NY
G	10	Eugene German	6 ft 0 in (1.83 m)	185 lb (84 kg)	Jr	21st Century Charter	Gary, IN
F	11	Noah McCarty	6 ft 8 in (2.03 m)	240 lb (109 kg)	Jr	Sterling Newman	Rock Falls, IL
G/F	12	Anastasios Demogerontas	6 ft 7 in (2.01 m)	215 lb (98 kg)	Sr	Carl Sandburg; Moraine Valley CC	Orland Park, IL
F	15	Jaylen Key	6 ft 8 in (2.03 m)	230 lb (104 kg)	Sr	Homestead	Milwaukee, WI
G	20	Caleb Oehlberg (W)	6 ft 0 in (1.83 m)	180 lb (82 kg)	Jr	DeKalb	DeKalb, IL
G	21	Alize Travis	6 ft 0 in (1.83 m)	170 lb (77 kg)	Jr	Eleanor Roosevelt; Pima CC	Victorville, CA
G	22	Rod Henry-Hayes	6 ft 4 in (1.93 m)	185 lb (84 kg)	So	Zion-Benton Township	Zion, IL
G/F	32	Austin Richie	6 ft 6 in (1.98 m)	225 lb (102 kg)	Fr	Don Bosco Prep	Glenwood, IL
G/F	42	Levi Bradley	6 ft 7 in (2.01 m)	210 lb (95 kg)	Sr	Pius XI	Milwaukee, WI
G	55	Brandon Danowski (W)	5 ft 11 in (1.8 m)	180 lb (82 kg)	So	Loyola Academy	Wilmette, IL

Head coach

- Mark Montgomery (Michigan State)

Assistant coach(es)

- Jon Borovich (Central Michigan)
- Lamar Chapman (Lane College)
- Brandon Watkins (Penn State)

Legend

- (C) Team captain
- (S) Suspended
- (I) Ineligible
- (W) Walk-on
- Injured
- Current redshirt

Roster
Last update: August 28, 2024

== Schedule and results ==
Date time, TV	Rank^{#}	Opponent^{#}	Result	Record	Site (attendance) city, state
Non-conference regular season
November 6, 2018*; 7:00 p.m.		Rockford; Battle for the 16th District	W 93–54	1–0	Convocation Center (843); DeKalb, IL
November 9, 2018*; 6:00 p.m., ESPN+		Northern Kentucky	L 85–88 ^{2OT}	1–1	Convocation Center (895); DeKalb, IL
November 17, 2018*; 2:00 p.m.		Illinois Tech; Men Against Breast Cancer Hoop Showcase	W 73–66	2–1	Convocation Center (673); DeKalb, IL
November 23, 2018*; 11:00 a.m.		vs. Oral Roberts; Men Against Breast Cancer Hoop Showcase	W 87–66	3–1	Athletics Center O'rena; Rochester, MI
November 24, 2018*; 11:00 a.m.		vs. James Madison; Men Against Breast Cancer Hoop Showcase	L 74–78	3–2	Athletics Center O'rena; Rochester, MI
November 25, 2018*; 1:30 p.m., ESPN+		at Oakland; Men Against Breast Cancer Hoop Showcase	W 92–72	4–2	Athletics Center O'rena (2.093); Rochester, MI
November 28, 2018*; 7:00 p.m., ESPN+		at Green Bay	L 83–85	4–3	Resch Center (1,669); Green Bay, WI
December 5, 2018*; 7:00 p.m., ESPN3		UC Davis	W 71–62	5–3	Convocation Center (910); DeKalb, IL
December 8, 2018*; 3:30 p.m., FS1		at Butler	L 68–95	5–4	Hinkle Fieldhouse (8,247); Indianapolis, IN
December 17, 2018*; 8:00 p.m., ESPN+		Western Illinois	W 91–76	6–4	Convocation Center (1,012); DeKalb, IL
December 20, 2018*; 6:00 p.m., ESPN+		at Northern Kentucky	L 62–65	6–5	BB&T Arena (2,757); Highland Heights, KY
December 22, 2018*; 1:00 p.m., ESPN+		Chicago State	W 100–59	7–5	Convocation Center (765); DeKalb, IL
December 29, 2018*; 1:00 p.m., BTN		at No. 8 Michigan State	L 60–88	7–6	Breslin Center (14,796); East Lansing, MI
MAC regular season
January 5, 2019; 1:00 p.m., ESPN3		at Ohio	W 72–66 ^{OT}	8–6 (1–0)	Convocation Center (5,121); Athens, OH
January 8, 2019; 6:00 p.m., ESPN+		at Miami (OH)	W 83–70	9–6 (2–0)	Millett Hall (1,611); Oxford, OH
January 12, 2019; 3:30 p.m., ESPN+		Akron	W 73–56	10–6 (3–0)	Convocation Center (906); DeKalb, IL
January 15, 2019; 7:00 p.m., ESPN+		Central Michigan	L 69–78	10–7 (3–1)	Convocation Center (1,001); DeKalb, IL
January 19, 2019; 6:00 p.m., ESPN3		at Kent State	L 68–78	10–8 (3–2)	MAC Center (2,291); Kent, OH
January 22, 2019; 7:00 p.m., ESPN+		No. 14 Buffalo	W 77–75	11–8 (4–2)	Convocation Center (1,284); DeKalb, IL
January 26, 2019; 4:00 p.m., ESPN+		at Akron	L 65–67	11–9 (4–3)	James A. Rhodes Arena (2,996); Akron, OH
January 29, 2019; 7:00 p.m., ESPN3		Ohio	W 71–60	12–9 (5–3)	Convocation Center (737); DeKalb, IL
February 2, 2019; 2:00 p.m., ESPN+		Toledo	L 55–69	12–10 (5–4)	Convocation Center (1,348); DeKalb, IL
February 5, 2019; 7:00 p.m., ESPN+		Ball State	L 71–72	12–11 (5–5)	Convocation Center (462); DeKalb, IL
February 9, 2019; 1:00 p.m., ESPN+		at Eastern Michigan	L 49–57	12–12 (5–6)	Convocation Center (1,634); Ypsilanti, MI
February 12, 2019; 6:00 p.m., ESPN+		at Western Michigan	L 74–76	12–13 (5–7)	University Arena (1,760); Kalamazoo, MI
February 16, 2019; 3:30 p.m., ESPN3		Bowling Green	L 67–87	12–14 (5–8)	Convocation Center (2,869); DeKalb, IL
February 23, 2019; 6:00 p.m., CBSSN		at Toledo	L 54–57	12–15 (5–9)	Savage Arena (5,534); Toledo, OH
February 26, 2019; 7:00 p.m., ESPN+		Western Michigan	W 70–65	13–15 (6–9)	Convocation Center (1,115); DeKalb, IL
March 2, 2019; 2:00 p.m., ESPN+		Eastern Michigan	L 69–75	13–16 (6–10)	Convocation Center (1,439); DeKalb, IL
March 5, 2019; 6:00 p.m., ESPN+		at Central Michigan	W 89–86	14–16 (7–10)	McGuirk Arena (1,709); Mount Pleasant, MI
March 8, 2019; 6:00 p.m., ESPN+		at Ball State	W 64–57	15–16 (8–10)	Worthen Arena; Muncie, IN
MAC tournament
March 11, 2019; 8:00 p.m., ESPN+	(7)	(10) Ohio; First round	W 80–61	16–16	Convocation Center (1,070); DeKalb, IL
March 14, 2019; 5:30 p.m., ESPN+	(7)	vs. (2) Toledo; Quarterfinals	W 80–76	17–16	Quicken Loans Arena; Cleveland, OH
March 15, 2019; 8:00 p.m., FCS	(7)	vs. (3) Bowling Green; Semifinals	L 67–71	17–17	Quicken Loans Arena; Cleveland, OH
*Non-conference game. ^{#}Rankings from AP poll. (#) Tournament seedings in parentheses. All times are in Central.
