= 2018–19 Toledo Rockets men's basketball team =

American college basketball season

2018–19 Toledo Rockets men's basketball

Gulf Coast Showcase champions MAC West division champions

NIT, First Round
- Conference: Mid-American Conference
- West Division
- Record: 25–8 (13–5 MAC)
- Head coach: Tod Kowalczyk (9th season)
- Assistant coaches: Jeff Massey; Kyle Barlow; Justin Ingram
- Home arena: Savage Arena

2018–19 Mid-American Conference men's basketball standings
| | Conf. | | | | Overall |
| Team | W | | L | PCT | W | | L | PCT |
|---|---|---|---|---|---|---|---|---|
East
| No. 15 Buffalo † | 16 | – | 2 | .889 | 32 | – | 4 | .889 |
| Bowling Green | 12 | – | 6 | .667 | 22 | – | 12 | .647 |
| Kent State | 11 | – | 7 | .611 | 22 | – | 11 | .667 |
| Akron | 8 | – | 10 | .444 | 17 | – | 16 | .515 |
| Miami (OH) | 7 | – | 11 | .389 | 15 | – | 17 | .469 |
| Ohio | 6 | – | 12 | .333 | 14 | – | 17 | .452 |
West
| Toledo | 13 | – | 5 | .722 | 25 | – | 8 | .758 |
| Central Michigan | 10 | – | 8 | .556 | 23 | – | 12 | .657 |
| Eastern Michigan | 9 | – | 9 | .500 | 15 | – | 17 | .469 |
| Northern Illinois | 8 | – | 10 | .444 | 17 | – | 17 | .500 |
| Ball State | 6 | – | 12 | .333 | 16 | – | 17 | .485 |
| Western Michigan | 2 | – | 16 | .111 | 8 | – | 24 | .250 |
† 2019 MAC tournament winner Rankings from AP Poll

The 2018–19 Toledo Rockets men's basketball team represented the University of Toledo during the 2018–19 NCAA Division I men's basketball season. The Rockets were led by eighth-year head coach Tod Kowalczyk, and played their home games at Savage Arena, as members of the West Division of the Mid-American Conference. They finished the season 25–8, 13–5 in MAC play to be champions of the West Division. They lost in the quarterfinals of the MAC tournament to Northern Illinois. They received an at-large bid to the National Invitation Tournament, where they lost in the first round to Xavier.

== Previous season ==
The Rockets finished the 2017–18 season 23–11, 13–5 in MAC play to win the MAC West division championship. As the No. 2 seed in the MAC tournament, they defeated Miami and Eastern Michigan before losing to Buffalo in the tournament championship. Despite winning 23 games, they did not participate in a postseason tournament.

== Offseason ==
=== Departures ===
| Name | Number | Pos. | Height | Weight | Year | Hometown | Reason for departure |
|---|---|---|---|---|---|---|---|
| Dwayne Rose Jr. | 1 | G | 6'3" | 185 | Freshman | Crete, IL | Transferred to Southwestern Illinois College |
| Taylor Adway | 2 | F | 6'9" | 215 | Junior | Hazel Crest, IL | Graduate transferred to Ferris State |
| Tre'Shaun Fletcher | 4 | G/F | 6'7" | 205 | Senior | Wilmar, AR | Graduated |
| Justin Roberts | 5 | G | 5'10" | 170 | Sophomore | Lawrence, KS | Transferred to Niagara |
| Vicpatrick Harris | 10 | G | 6'2" | 195 | Senior | Chicago, IL | Graduated |

=== Incoming transfers ===
| Name | Number | Pos. | Height | Weight | Year | Hometown | Previous college |
|---|---|---|---|---|---|---|---|
| Chris Darrington | 32 | G | 6'1" | 179 | Senior | Toledo, OH | Transferred from Tennessee. Was eligible to play immediately since Darrington graduated from Tennessee. |

=== Recruiting class of 2018 ===
College recruiting
| Name | Hometown | School | Height | Weight | Commit date |
|---|---|---|---|---|---|
| Keshaun Saunders; SG | Brampton, ON | Orangeville Prep | 6 ft 4 in (1.93 m) | 185 lb (84 kg) | Feb 13, 2018 |
| Keshaun Saunders; SG | Recruit ratings: Scout: Rivals: (NR) | | | | |
| T. J. Smith; SG | Matteson, IL | Marian Catholic High School | 6 ft 4 in (1.93 m) | 170 lb (77 kg) | Nov 22, 2017 |
| T. J. Smith; SG | Recruit ratings: Scout: Rivals: (NR) | | | | |
| A. J. Edu; PF | England | South Gloucestershire and Stroud College | 6 ft 10 in (2.08 m) | 250 lb (110 kg) | Apr 12, 2018 |
| A. J. Edu; PF | Recruit ratings: Scout: Rivals: (NR) | | | | |
Overall recruit ranking:
Note: In many cases, Scout, Rivals, 247Sports, On3, and ESPN may conflict in their listings of height and weight.; In these cases, the average was taken. ESPN grades are on a 100-point scale.; Sources: "2018 Team Ranking". Rivals.

=== Recruiting class of 2019 ===
College recruiting (2019)
| Name | Hometown | School | Height | Weight | Commit date |
|---|---|---|---|---|---|
| Luke Maranka; PF | Ada, MI | Grand Rapids Angels Homeschool | 6 ft 11 in (2.11 m) | 215 lb (98 kg) | Sep 19, 2018 |
| Luke Maranka; PF | Recruit ratings: Scout: Rivals: (NR) | | | | |
| Donavan Moore; SG | West Bloomfield, MI | West Bloomfield High School | 6 ft 3 in (1.91 m) | N/A | Jul 17, 2017 |
| Donavan Moore; SG | Recruit ratings: Scout: Rivals: (NR) | | | | |
| Aaron Etherington; SF | Fishers, IN | Hamilton Southeastern High School | 6 ft 5 in (1.96 m) | 190 lb (86 kg) | Jul 2, 2018 |
| Aaron Etherington; SF | Recruit ratings: Scout: Rivals: 247Sports: (NR) | | | | |
Overall recruit ranking:
Note: In many cases, Scout, Rivals, 247Sports, On3, and ESPN may conflict in their listings of height and weight.; In these cases, the average was taken. ESPN grades are on a 100-point scale.; Sources: "2019 Team Ranking". Rivals.

== Roster ==
2018–19 Toledo Rockets men's basketball team
Players
Coaches

| Pos. | # | Name | Height | Weight | Year | Previous school | Hometown |
|---|---|---|---|---|---|---|---|
| F | 0 | James Gordon IV | 6 ft 5 in (1.96 m) | 225 lb (102 kg) | RS So | Chicago Simeon | Shelbyville, KY |
| F | 1 | T. J. Smith | 6 ft 8 in (2.03 m) | 195 lb (88 kg) | Fr | Aspire Academy | Matteson, IL |
| G | 3 | Marreon Jackson | 6 ft 0 in (1.83 m) | 175 lb (79 kg) | So | Garfield Heights | Cleveland, OH |
| G | 11 | Spencer Littleson | 6 ft 4 in (1.93 m) | 200 lb (91 kg) | RS So | Rochester Adams; Duquesne | Rochester Hills, MI |
| G | 13 | Jaelan Sanford | 6 ft 4 in (1.93 m) | 200 lb (91 kg) | Sr | Reitz | Evansville, IN |
| F | 15 | A. J. Edu | 6 ft 10 in (2.08 m) | 215 lb (98 kg) | Fr | South Gloucestershire and Stroud College | Colchester, England |
| G | 20 | Matt Schaffer (W) | 6 ft 1 in (1.85 m) | 185 lb (84 kg) | Jr | Southview | Sylvania, OH |
| G | 21 | Dylan Alderson | 6 ft 5 in (1.96 m) | 205 lb (93 kg) | So | Clarkston | Clarkston, MI |
| G | 22 | Blake Williams (W) | 6 ft 0 in (1.83 m) | 185 lb (84 kg) | So | St. John's Jesuit | Holland, OH |
| F | 23 | Willie Jackson | 6 ft 6 in (1.98 m) | 215 lb (98 kg) | Jr | Garfield Heights; Missouri | Cleveland, OH |
| G | 24 | Keshaun Saunders | 6 ft 5 in (1.96 m) | 190 lb (86 kg) | Fr | Orangeville Prep | Brampton, ON |
| C | 30 | Luke Knapke | 6 ft 11 in (2.11 m) | 245 lb (111 kg) | RS Jr | Marion Local | Maria Stein, OH |
| G | 32 | Chris Darrington | 6 ft 1 in (1.85 m) | 185 lb (84 kg) | Sr | Scott; Tennessee | Toledo, OH |
| F | 35 | Nate Navigato | 6 ft 8 in (2.03 m) | 225 lb (102 kg) | Sr | Geneva | Geneva, IL |
| F | 41 | Logan Hill | 6 ft 7 in (2.01 m) | 215 lb (98 kg) | RS Fr | Jackson | Massillon, OH |

Head coach

- Tod Kowalczyk (Minnesota Duluth)

Assistant coach(es)

- Jeff Massey (Xavier)
- Kyle Barlow (Concordia (MI))
- Justin Ingram (Toledo)

Legend

- (C) Team captain
- (S) Suspended
- (I) Ineligible
- (W) Walk-on
- Injured
- Current redshirt

Roster

== Schedule and results ==
| Date time, TV | Rank^{#} | Opponent^{#} | Result | Record | Site (attendance) city, state |
Exhibition
| Nov 3, 2018*; 2:30 pm | | Hillsdale | W 72–63 | | Savage Arena; Toledo, OH |
Non-conference regular season
| Nov 9, 2018*; 7:00 pm, ESPN3 | | at Oakland | W 87–86 | 1–0 | Athletics Center O'rena (3,841); Rochester, MI |
| Nov 10, 2018*; 7:00 pm, ESPN3 | | Wilberforce; Gulf Coast Showcase campus site game | W 99–58 | 2–0 | Savage Arena (4,839); Toledo, OH |
| Nov 14, 2018*; 4:00 pm, ESPN+ | | at Wright State | L 74–84 | 2–1 | Nutter Center (3,263); Fairborn, OH |
| Nov 19, 2018*; 7:30 pm | | vs. Florida Gulf Coast; Gulf Coast Showcase Quarterfinals | W 90–62 | 3–1 | Hertz Arena; Estero, FL |
| Nov 20, 2018*; 7:30 pm | | vs. Louisiana; Gulf Coast Showcase Semifinals | W 77–64 | 4–1 | Hertz Arena (567); Estero, FL |
| Nov 21, 2018*; 7:30 pm | | vs. UC Irvine; Gulf Coast Showcase championship | W 67–60 | 5–1 | Hertz Arena (1,031); Estero, FL |
| Nov 28, 2018*; 7:00 pm, ESPN+ | | North Alabama | W 80–59 | 6–1 | Savage Arena (3,714); Toledo, OH |
| Dec 1, 2018*; 2:00 pm, ESPN+ | | Cleveland State | W 80–67 | 7–1 | Savage Arena (4,636); Toledo, OH |
| Dec 5, 2018*; 7:00 pm, ESPN3 | | Detroit Mercy | W 101–57 | 8–1 | Savage Arena (3,629); Toledo, OH |
| Dec 8, 2018*; 2:30 pm | | at Marshall | W 75–74 ^{OT} | 9–1 | Cam Henderson Center (6,232); Huntington, WV |
| Dec 15, 2018*; 7:00 pm, ESPN+ | | Middle Tennessee | W 84–62 | 10–1 | Savage Arena (4,205); Toledo, OH |
| Dec 19, 2018*; 7:00 pm, ESPN+ | | Cornell | W 86–70 | 11–1 | Savage Arena (3,748); Toledo, OH |
| Dec 29, 2018*; 7:00 pm, ESPN+ | | Penn | W 77–45 | 12–1 | Savage Arena (4,786); Toledo, OH |
MAC regular season
| Jan 4, 2019; 7:00 pm, CBSSN | | Ball State | L 64–79 | 12–2 (0–1) | Savage Arena (5,023); Toledo, OH |
| Jan 8, 2019; 7:00 pm, ESPN+ | | at No. 19 Buffalo | L 80–110 | 12–3 (0–2) | Alumni Arena (5,144); Amherst, NY |
| Jan 12, 2019; 7:00 pm, ESPN+ | | at Western Michigan | W 85–77 | 13–3 (1–2) | University Arena (5,421); Kalamazoo, MI |
| Jan 15, 2019; 7:00 pm, ESPN3 | | Miami (OH) | W 71–59 | 14–3 (2–2) | Savage Arena (4,386); Toledo, OH |
| Jan 18, 2019; 7:00 pm, CBSSN | | Ohio | W 75–52 | 15–3 (3–2) | Savage Arena (5,037); Toledo, OH |
| Jan 22, 2019; 7:00 pm, ESPN+ | | at Kent State | L 85–87 ^{OT} | 15–4 (3–3) | MAC Center (2,205); Kent, OH |
| Jan 26, 2019; 7:00 pm, ESPN+ | | Central Michigan | W 76–72 | 16–4 (4–3) | Savage Arena (5,211); Toledo, OH |
| Jan 29, 2019; 7:00 pm, ESPN+ | | at Miami (OH) | W 66–63 | 17–4 (5–3) | Millett Hall (1,677); Oxford, OH |
| Feb 2, 2019; 3:00 pm, ESPN+ | | at Northern Illinois | W 69–55 | 18–4 (6–3) | Convocation Center (1,348); DeKalb, IL |
| Feb 5, 2019; 7:00 pm, ESPN+ | | Akron | W 63–52 | 19–4 (7–3) | Savage Arena (3,895); Toledo, OH |
| Feb 9, 2019; 6:00 pm, ESPN3 | | at Bowling Green | W 78–71 | 20–4 (8–3) | Stroh Center (5,000); Bowling Green, OH |
| Feb 15, 2019; 7:00 pm, ESPNU | | No. 25 Buffalo | L 82–88 | 20–5 (8–4) | Savage Arena (7,401); Toledo, OH |
| Feb 19, 2019; 7:00 pm, ESPN+ | | at Eastern Michigan | L 69–76 | 20–6 (8–5) | Convocation Center (1,849); Ypsilanti, MI |
| Feb 23, 2019; 6:00 pm, CBSSN | | Northern Illinois | W 57–54 | 21–6 (9–5) | Savage Arena (5,534); Toledo, OH |
| Feb 26, 2019; 7:00 pm, ESPN+ | | at Ball State | W 80–72 | 22–6 (10–5) | Worthen Arena (4,691); Muncie, IN |
| Mar 2, 2019; 4:30 pm, ESPN+ | | at Central Michigan | W 80–68 | 23–6 (11–5) | McGuirk Arena (2,216); Mount Pleasant, MI |
| Mar 5, 2019; 7:00 pm, ESPN+ | | Western Michigan | W 76–57 | 24–6 (12–5) | Savage Arena (4,233); Toledo, OH |
| Mar 8, 2019; 7:00 pm, ESPN+ | | Eastern Michigan | W 64–58 | 25–6 (13–5) | Savage Arena (6,061); Toledo, OH |
MAC tournament
| Mar 14, 2019; 6:30 pm, ESPN+ | (2) | vs. (7) Northern Illinois; Quarterfinals | L 76–80 | 25–7 | Quicken Loans Arena; Cleveland, OH |
NIT
| Mar 20, 2019*; 7:00 pm, ESPN3 | (6) | at (3) Xavier; First round – Alabama bracket | L 64–78 | 25–8 | Cintas Center (5,769); Cincinnati, OH |
*Non-conference game. ^{#}Rankings from AP Poll. (#) Tournament seedings in parentheses. All times are in Eastern Time.
