= 2018–19 Eastern Michigan Eagles men's basketball team =

American college basketball season

2018–19 Eastern Michigan Eagles men's basketball
- Conference: Mid-American Conference
- West Division
- Record: 15–17 (9–9 MAC)
- Head coach: Rob Murphy (8th season)
- Assistant coaches: Kevin Mondro; Matt Cline; Jimmy Wooten
- Home arena: Convocation Center

2018–19 Mid-American Conference men's basketball standings
	Conf.				Overall
Team	W		L	PCT	W		L	PCT
East
No. 15 Buffalo †	16	–	2	.889	32	–	4	.889
Bowling Green	12	–	6	.667	22	–	12	.647
Kent State	11	–	7	.611	22	–	11	.667
Akron	8	–	10	.444	17	–	16	.515
Miami (OH)	7	–	11	.389	15	–	17	.469
Ohio	6	–	12	.333	14	–	17	.452
West
Toledo	13	–	5	.722	25	–	8	.758
Central Michigan	10	–	8	.556	23	–	12	.657
Eastern Michigan	9	–	9	.500	15	–	17	.469
Northern Illinois	8	–	10	.444	17	–	17	.500
Ball State	6	–	12	.333	16	–	17	.485
Western Michigan	2	–	16	.111	8	–	24	.250
† 2019 MAC tournament winner Rankings from AP Poll

The 2018–19 Eastern Michigan Eagles men's basketball team represented Eastern Michigan University during the 2018–19 NCAA Division I men's basketball season. The Eagles, led by eighth-year head coach Rob Murphy, played their home games at the Convocation Center in Ypsilanti, Michigan as members of the West Division of the Mid-American Conference. They finished the season 15–17, 9–9 in MAC play to finish in third place in the West Division. They lost in the first round of the MAC tournament to Ball State.

== Previous season ==
They finished the season 22–13, 11–7 in MAC play to finish in second place in the West Division. They defeated Akron in the quarterfinals of the MAC tournament before losing in the semifinals to Toledo. They were invited to the CollegeInsider.com Tournament where they defeated Niagara in the first round before losing in the second round to Sam Houston State.

== Offseason ==
=== Departures ===
Name	Number	Pos.	Height	Weight	Year	Hometown	Notes
Tim Bond	1	G	6'7"	160	RS Senior	Baltimore, MD	Graduated
Terry Harris	4	G/F	6'6"	215	Junior	Dix Hills, NY	Transferred
Jalen Brown	12	G	5'9"	160	Sophomore	Harper Woods, MI	
Jordan Nobles	15	F	6'9"	195	Junior	Canton, MI	Transferred to Oakland

=== Incoming transfers ===
Name	Number	Pos.	Height	Weight	Year	Hometown	Previous School
Daivon Stephens	1	F	6'6"	206	Freshman	Pittsburgh, PA	Penn Hills Senior
Boubacar Toure	12	C	6'11"	241	RS Junior	Sakar, Senegal	Phase One Academy/Grand Canyon
Damari Parris	23	G	6'1"	157	Junior	Bowie, MD	Evelyn Mack Academy/Trinity Valley CC
Andre Rafus Jr.	25	G/F	6'9"	178	Freshman	Baltimore, MD	Reach Partnership at Lake Clifton

== Roster ==
2018–19 Eastern Michigan Eagles men's basketball team
Players
Coaches

Pos.	#	Name	Height	Weight	Year	Previous school	Hometown
G	0	Jorden Peterson	6 ft 4 in (1.93 m)	75 lb (34 kg)	RS Fr	CMA	Detroit, MI
F	1	Daivon Stephens	6 ft 6 in (1.98 m)	206 lb (93 kg)	Fr	Penn Hills Senior	Pittsburgh, PA
F/C	2	James Thompson IV	6 ft 10 in (2.08 m)	241 lb (109 kg)	Sr	Parkview Baptist	Baton Rouge, LA
G	3	Paul Jackson	6 ft 2 in (1.88 m)	178 lb (81 kg)	RS Sr	Martin Luther King Jr./Eastern Kentucky	Stone Mountain, GA
F	5	Elijah Minnie	6 ft 9 in (2.06 m)	212 lb (96 kg)	RS Sr	Lincoln Park/Robert Morris	Pittsburgh, PA
G	10	Malik Ellison	5 ft 8 in (1.73 m)	170 lb (77 kg)	So	Beecher	Flint, MI
C	12	Boubacar Toure	6 ft 11 in (2.11 m)	241 lb (109 kg)	RS Jr	Phase One Academy/Grand Canyon	Dakar, Senegal
F	20	Bud Jones	6 ft 8 in (2.03 m)	265 lb (120 kg)	So	TL Hanna	Anderson, SC
G	21	Kevin McAdoo	6 ft 2 in (1.88 m)	167 lb (76 kg)	So	West Bloomfield	Pontiac, MI
G	22	Tariq Silver	6 ft 5 in (1.96 m)	202 lb (92 kg)	RS Fr	Northwest	Clarksville, TN
G	23	Damari Parris	6 ft 1 in (1.85 m)	157 lb (71 kg)	Jr	Evelyn Mack Academy/ Trinity VAlley CC	Bowie, MD
G/F	25	Andre Rafus Jr.	6 ft 9 in (2.06 m)	178 lb (81 kg)	Fr	Reach Partnership at Lake Clifton	Baltimore, MD
F	30	Jalen King	6 ft 9 in (2.06 m)	215 lb (98 kg)	So	Kings Academy	Pasco, WA
F	31	Ty Groce	6 ft 7 in (2.01 m)	207 lb (94 kg)	RS So	Lincoln	Ypsilanti, MI
F	32	Isaiah Green	6 ft 7 in (2.01 m)	204 lb (93 kg)	Sr	Southfield/Lansing CC	Southfield, MI
F	33	Derek Ballard Jr.	6 ft 8 in (2.03 m)	229 lb (104 kg)	RS Fr	Southfield-Lathrup	Southfield, MI

Head coach

- Rob Murphy (Central State)

Assistant coach(es)

- Kevin Mondro (Detroit Mercy)
- Matt Kline (South Alabama)
- Jimmy Wooten (Arkansas State)

Legend

- (C) Team captain
- (S) Suspended
- (I) Ineligible
- (W) Walk-on
- Injured
- Current redshirt

Roster
Last update: Oct. 5, 2018

== Preseason ==
The Eagles were predicted to finish first in the MAC West by several college basketball preseason magazines. Those included Lindy's Sports College BasketballLindy's Sports, Athlon Sports College Basketball and Street & Smith's Basketball Yearbook.

=== Preseason Awards ===
Kareem Abdul-Jabbar Award Preseason Watch List

- James Thompson IV

Julius Erving Award Watch List

- Elijah Minnie

==== Street & Smith's Basketball ====
All Conference

- James Thompson IV

All Newcomer

- Andre Rafus Jr.

All Defense

- James Thompson IV

All Sharpshooter

- Elijah Minnie

==== Athlon Sports ====
All MAC First Team

- James Thompson IV

==== Lindy's Sports ====
All Conference First Team

- James Thompson IV

All Conference Second Team

- Elijah Minnie

Player of the Year

- James Thompson IV

Best Rebounder

- James Thompson IV

Best Defender

- James Thompson IV

Most Versatile

- Elijah Minnie

Best NBA Prospect

- James Thompson IV

== Schedule and results ==
Date time, TV	Rank^{#}	Opponent^{#}	Result	Record	High points	High rebounds	High assists	Site (attendance) city, state
Non-conference regular season
November 6, 2018*; 6:00 pm, ESPN+		Rochester	W 77–67	1–0	27 – Jackson	14 – Toure	7 – Jackson	Convocation Center (1,193); Ypsilanti, MI
November 9, 2018*; 11:00 am, ESPN+		Drexel; Hub City Classic	W 66–62	2–0	20 – Jackson	11 – Thompson IV	6 – Jackson	Convocation Center (3,895); Ypsilanti, MI
November 11, 2018*; 2:00 pm, ESPN+		Goshen; Hub City Classic	W 97–74	3–0	17 – Minnie	9 – Thompson IV	5 – Jackson	Convocation Center (1,056); Ypsilanti, MI
November 14, 2018*; 7:00 pm, RSN \ ESPN+		at No. 1 Duke	L 46–84	3–1	9 – McAdoo	7 – Thompson IV	3 – Ellison	Cameron Indoor Stadium (9,314); Durham, NC
November 17, 2018*; 2:30 pm, ESPN+		Boston University; Hub City Classic	W 80–62	4–1	28 – Minnie	14 – Thompson IV	4 – Jackson	Convocation Center (2,059); Ypsilanti, MI
November 19, 2018*; 7:00 pm, BTN		at Rutgers; Hub City Classic	L 36–63	4–2	7 – Toure	8 – Thompson IV	3 – Jackson	Louis Brown Athletic Center (4,473); Piscataway, NJ
November 24, 2018*; 2:00 pm, ESPN+		Detroit	L 74–78	4–3	24 – Thompson IV	15 – Toure	4 – 3 Tied	Convocation Center (1,226); Ypsilanti, MI
November 26, 2018*; 8:30 pm, FSSW		at TCU	L 69–87	4–4	20 – Toure	12 – Toure	7 – Parris	Schollmaier Arena (6,219); Fort Worth, TX
December 1, 2018*; 3:00 pm		at Northeastern	L 67–81	4–5	24 – Minnie	9 – Thompson IV	8 – Parris	Matthews Arena (1,147); Boston, MA
December 8, 2018*; 12:00 pm, ESPN+		Central State	W 105–53	5–5	16 – Tied	9 – Groce	7 – Parris	Convocation Center (1,153); Ypsilanti, MI
December 19, 2018*; 7:00 pm, ESPN+		UC Irvine	L 48–52	5–6	15 – Minnie	7 – Tied	2 – Jackson	Convocation Center (1,187); Ypsilanti, MI
December 22, 2018*; 2:00 pm, ESPN+		Siena Heights	W 90–72	6–6	18 – McAdoo	16 – Thompson IV	4 – Groce	Convocation Center (1,259); Ypsilanti, MI
December 29, 2018*; 2:00 pm, JTV/ESPN+		at No. 5 Kansas	L 63–87	6–7	15 – Thompson IV	14 – Thompson IV	3 – Ellison	Allen Fieldhouse (16,300); Lawrence, KS
MAC regular season
January 4, 2019; 9:00 pm, CBSSN		No. 20 Buffalo	L 58–74	6–8 (0–1)	21 – Minnie	12 – Thompson IV	4 – Jackson	Convocation Center (2,378); Ypsilanti, MI
January 8, 2019; 8:00 pm, ESPN+		at Ball State	W 84–82 ^{2OT}	7–8 (1–1)	25 – Minnie	19 – Thompson IV	5 – Jackson	Worthen Arena (4,248); Muncie, IN
January 12, 2019; 12:00 pm, ESPN+		Kent State	W 95–61	8–8 (2–1)	22 – Minnie	8 – Tied	7 – Jackson	Convocation Center (1,827); Ypsilanti, MI
January 15, 2019; 7:00 pm, ESPN+		at Akron	L 49–51	8–9 (2–2)	15 – Tied	11 – Thompson IV	5 – Jackson	James A. Rhodes Arena (2,334); Akron, OH
January 18, 2019; 7:00 pm, ESPNU		at No. 16 Buffalo	L 65–77	8–10 (2–3)	12 – Jackson	12 – Thompson IV	6 – Jackson	Alumni Arena (6,193); Amherst, NY
January 22, 2019; 7:00 pm, ESPN+		Bowling Green	L 67–80	8–11 (2–4)	16 – Thompson IV	12 – Thompson IV	3 – McAdoo	Convocation Center (1,509); Ypsilanti, MI
January 26, 2019; 2:00 pm, ESPN+		at Western Michigan; Michigan MAC Trophy	W 93–67	9–11 (3–4)	29 – Minnie	14 – Thompson IV	10 – Jackson	University Arena (2,514); Kalamazoo, MI
January 29, 2019; 7:00 pm, ESPN+		at Central Michigan; Michigan MAC Trophy	L 82–86	9–12 (3–5)	21 – Jackson	10 – Toure	4 – Jackson	McGuirk Arena (1,719); Mount Pleasant, MI
February 2, 2019; 12:00 pm, ESPN+		Miami (OH)	L 48–59	9–13 (3–6)	16 – Jackson	14 – Toure	5 – Jackson	Convocation Center (1,658); Ypsilanti, MI
February 9, 2019; 2:00 pm, ESPN+		Northern Illinois	W 57–49	10–13 (4–6)	23 – Jackson	10 – Toure	6 – Jackson	Convocation Center (1,634); Ypsilanti, MI
February 12, 2019; 7:00 pm, ESPN+		at Ohio	W 66–57	11–13 (5–6)	19 – Minnie	15 – Thompson IV	7 – Jackson	Convocation Center (5,522); Athens, OH
February 16, 2019; 7:00 pm, ESPN+		at Kent State	L 58–71	11–14 (5–7)	13 – McAdoo	9 – Thompson IV	3 – Jackson	Memorial Athletic and Convocation Center (3,491); Kent, OH
February 19, 2019; 7:00 pm, ESPN+		Toledo	W 76–69	12–14 (6–7)	23 – Minnie	9 – Minnie	5 – Jackson	Convocation Center (1,849); Ypsilanti, MI
February 23, 2019; 2:00 pm, ESPN3		Western Michigan; Michigan MAC Trophy	W 77–76 ^{OT}	13–14 (7–7)	18 – Jackson	11 – Thompson IV	7 – Jackson	Convocation Center (2,068); Ypsilanti, MI
February 26, 2019; 7:00 pm, ESPN+		Central Michigan; Michigan MAC Trophy	L 66–67	13–15 (7–8)	19 – Jackson	12 – Thompson IV	5 – Jackson	Convocation Center (1,455); Ypsilanti, MI
March 2, 2019; 7:00 pm, ESPN+		at Northern Illinois	W 75–69	14–15 (8–8)	19 – Jackson	17 – Thompson IV	6 – Jackson	Convocation Center (1,439); DeKalb, IL
March 5, 2019; 7:00 pm, ESPN+		Ball State	W 68–61	15–15 (9–8)	20 – Thompson IV	23 – Thompson IV	4 – Jackson	Convocation Center (1,780); Ypsilanti, MI
March 8, 2019; 7:00 pm, ESPN+		at Toledo	L 58–64	15–16 (9–9)	17 – Jackson	11 – Thompson IV	3 – Jackson	Savage Arena (6,061); Toledo, OH
MAC tournament
March 11, 2019; 7:00 pm, ESPN+	(6)	(11) Ball State; First round	L 43–61	15–17	12 – Jackson	9 – Thompson IV	4 – Jackson	Convocation Center (1,265); Ypsilanti, MI
*Non-conference game. ^{#}Rankings from AP Poll. (#) Tournament seedings in parentheses. All times are in Eastern Time Source.

== Game notes ==
=== Drexel ===
- Education Day
