= 2018–19 Western Michigan Broncos men's basketball team =

American college basketball season

2018–19 Western Michigan Broncos men's basketball
- Conference: Mid-American Conference
- West Division
- Record: 8–24 (2–16 MAC)
- Head coach: Steve Hawkins (16th season)
- Assistant coaches: Clayton Bates; Thomas Kelley; Glen Heffernan
- Home arena: University Arena

2018–19 Mid-American Conference men's basketball standings
	Conf.				Overall
Team	W		L	PCT	W		L	PCT
East
No. 15 Buffalo †	16	–	2	.889	32	–	4	.889
Bowling Green	12	–	6	.667	22	–	12	.647
Kent State	11	–	7	.611	22	–	11	.667
Akron	8	–	10	.444	17	–	16	.515
Miami (OH)	7	–	11	.389	15	–	17	.469
Ohio	6	–	12	.333	14	–	17	.452
West
Toledo	13	–	5	.722	25	–	8	.758
Central Michigan	10	–	8	.556	23	–	12	.657
Eastern Michigan	9	–	9	.500	15	–	17	.469
Northern Illinois	8	–	10	.444	17	–	17	.500
Ball State	6	–	12	.333	16	–	17	.485
Western Michigan	2	–	16	.111	8	–	24	.250
† 2019 MAC tournament winner Rankings from AP Poll

The 2018–19 Western Michigan Broncos men's basketball team represented Western Michigan University during the 2018–19 NCAA Division I men's basketball season. The Broncos were led by 16th-year head coach Steve Hawkins, and played their home games at University Arena as members of the West Division of the Mid-American Conference. They finished the season 8–24 overall, 2–16 in MAC play to finish in last place in the West Division. As the No. 12 seed in the MAC tournament, they lost in the first round to Central Michigan.

== Previous season ==
The Broncos finished the 2016–17 season 17–15, 9–9 in MAC play to finish fourth in the West Division. As the No. 8 seed in the MAC tournament, they lost in the first round to Akron.

== Offseason ==
=== Departures ===
Name	Number	Pos.	Height	Weight	Year	Hometown	Reason for departure
Kyle McDermed	2	G	6'2"	175	Freshman	Frankfort, IL	Walk-on; transferred to Bryant & Stratton College
Thomas Wilder	10	G	6'3"	190	Senior	Montgomery, IL	Graduated/signed to play professional in Germany with Riesen Ludwigsburg
Jarrin Randall	12	G	5'11"	165	Sophomore	Chicago, IL	Transferred to Davenport
Reggie Jones	23	G/F	6'6"	215	Sophomore	Marion, IN	Transferred to Tulsa
Drake LaMont	42	C	6'10"	250	Senior	Plantation, FL	Graduated

=== Incoming transfers ===
Name	Number	Pos.	Height	Weight	Year	Hometown	Previous School
Kawanise Wilkins	11	G	6'5"	230	Sophomore	Chicago, IL	Junior college transferred from Barton Community College

=== Recruiting class of 2018 ===
College recruiting information
Name	Hometown	School	Height	Weight	Commit date
William Boyer-Richard; PG	Drummondville, QC	Collège Jean-de-Brébeuf	6 ft 1 in (1.85 m)	N/A	Nov 17, 2017
William Boyer-Richard; PG	Recruit ratings: Scout: Rivals: (NR)				
Adrian Martin; SG	Sugar Hill, GA	Lanier High School	6 ft 3 in (1.91 m)	170 lb (77 kg)	Apr 17, 2018
Adrian Martin; SG	Recruit ratings: Scout: Rivals: (NR)				
Patrick Emilien; SF	Toronto, ON	Athlete Institute Basketball Academy	6 ft 7 in (2.01 m)	175 lb (79 kg)	Mar 21, 2018
Patrick Emilien; SF	Recruit ratings: Scout: Rivals: (NR)				
Overall recruit ranking:
Note: In many cases, Scout, Rivals, 247Sports, On3, and ESPN may conflict in their listings of height and weight.; In these cases, the average was taken. ESPN grades are on a 100-point scale.; Sources: "2018 Western Michigan Basketball Commits". Rivals.; "2018 Western Michigan Basketball Commits". Scout.; "2018 Western Michigan Basketball Commits". ESPN.; "Scout.com Team Recruiting Rankings". Scout.; "2018 Team Ranking". Rivals.

=== Recruiting class of 2019 ===
College recruiting information (2019)
Name	Hometown	School	Height	Weight	Commit date
B. Artis White; PG	Detroit, MI	Detroit, MICanton High School	5 ft 10 in (1.78 m)	132 lb (60 kg)	Sep 29, 2018
B. Artis White; PG	Recruit ratings: Scout: Rivals: (NR)				
Chase Barrs; PF	Tampa, FL	Berkeley Prep	6 ft 8 in (2.03 m)	180 lb (82 kg)	Sep 29, 2018
Chase Barrs; PF	Recruit ratings: Scout: Rivals: (NR)				
Overall recruit ranking:
Note: In many cases, Scout, Rivals, 247Sports, On3, and ESPN may conflict in their listings of height and weight.; In these cases, the average was taken. ESPN grades are on a 100-point scale.; Sources: "2019 Western Michigan Basketball Commits". Rivals.; "2019 Western Michigan Basketball Commits". Scout.; "2019 Western Michigan Basketball Commits". ESPN.; "Scout.com Team Recruiting Rankings". Scout.; "2019 Team Ranking". Rivals.

== Roster ==
2018–19 Western Michigan Broncos men's basketball team
Players
Coaches

Pos.	#	Name	Height	Weight	Year	Previous school	Hometown
G	0	Bryce Moore	6 ft 2 in (1.88 m)	195 lb (88 kg)	Sr	Park Tudor	Indianapolis, IN
G	1	D. J. Houston (W)	5 ft 11 in (1.8 m)	—	Fr	Crossroads	Santa Monica, CA
G	2	Adrian Martin	6 ft 3 in (1.91 m)	170 lb (77 kg)	Fr	Lanier	Sugar Hill, GA
G/F	3	Josh Davis	6 ft 5 in (1.96 m)	200 lb (91 kg)	Sr	Henry J. Ford	Detroit, MI
G	4	Jared Printy	6 ft 4 in (1.93 m)	185 lb (84 kg)	Jr	Linn-Mar	Cedar Rapids, IA
G	10	Luke Toliver (W)	5 ft 11 in (1.8 m)	—	Fr	Paw Paw	Paw Paw, MI
F	11	Kawanise Wilkins	6 ft 5 in (1.96 m)	235 lb (107 kg)	So	Farragut; Barton CC	Chicago, IL
G	12	Michael Flowers	6 ft 1 in (1.85 m)	195 lb (88 kg)	So	Southfield A&T	Southfield, MI
F	15	Patrick Emilien	6 ft 6 in (1.98 m)	190 lb (86 kg)	Fr	Toronto Basketball Academy	Toronto, ON
G	20	William Boyer-Richard	6 ft 1 in (1.85 m)	185 lb (84 kg)	Fr	Collège Jean-de-Brébeuf	Drummondville, QC
F	24	Adida Ikongshul	6 ft 6 in (1.98 m)	195 lb (88 kg)	Jr	Madison Consolidated	Madison, IN
G	30	Jason Whitens	6 ft 5 in (1.96 m)	200 lb (91 kg)	So	Powers North Central	Powers, MI
F	32	T. J. Clifford	6 ft 5 in (1.96 m)	225 lb (102 kg)	So	Downers Grove South	Downers Grove, IL
F	35	Brandon Johnson	6 ft 8 in (2.03 m)	210 lb (95 kg)	Jr	Thea Bowman Leadership Academy	Chicago, IL
C	50	Seth Dugan	7 ft 0 in (2.13 m)	240 lb (109 kg)	Sr	Otsego	Otsego, MI

Head coach

- Steve Hawkins (South Alabama)

Assistant coach(es)

- Clayton Bates (Florida)
- Thomas Kelley (Michigan State)
- Glen Heffernan (Cardinal Stritch)

Legend

- (C) Team captain
- (S) Suspended
- (I) Ineligible
- (W) Walk-on
- Injured
- Current redshirt

Roster

== Schedule and results ==
Date time, TV	Rank^{#}	Opponent^{#}	Result	Record	Site (attendance) city, state
Exhibition
Oct 27, 2018*; 2:00 pm		Northwood	W 86–66		University Arena (1,319); Kalamazoo, MI
Nov 3, 2018*; 2:00 pm		Kalamazoo	W 110–70		University Arena (1,760); Kalamazoo, MI
Non-conference regular season
Nov 6, 2018*; 7:00 pm, ESPN3		Detroit Mercy	W 89–76	1–0	University Arena (1,798); Kalamazoo, MI
Nov 10, 2018*; 4:00 pm, SECN+		at Ole Miss; Emerald Coast Classic	L 64–90	1–1	The Pavilion at Ole Miss (5,205); Oxford, MS
Nov 13, 2018*; 7:00 pm, ESPN+		at Oakland	W 85–77 ^{OT}	2–1	Athletics Center O'rena (2,897); Rochester, MI
Nov 17, 2018*; 2:00 pm		Aquinas	W 99–52	3–1	University Arena (1,871); Kalamazoo, MI
Nov 19, 2018*; 7:00 pm		at Cincinnati; Emerald Coast Classic	L 52–78	3–2	Fifth Third Arena (8,998); Cincinnati, OH
Nov 23, 2018*; 1:30 pm		vs. Southern; Emerald Coast Classic Visitors semifinals	W 85–70	4–2	The Arena at NFSC (125); Niceville, FL
Nov 24, 2018*; 1:30 pm		vs. Nicholls State; Emerald Coast Classic Visitors finals	L 61–62 ^{OT}	4–3	The Arena at NFSC (125); Niceville, FL
Dec 1, 2018*; 2:00 pm		USC Upstate	L 66–71	4–4	University Arena (1,845); Kalamazoo, MI
Dec 8, 2018*; 2:00 pm		at Youngstown State	W 88–77	5–4	Beeghly Center (3,449); Youngstown, OH
Dec 15, 2018*; 2:00 pm, BTN		at No. 5 Michigan	L 62–70	5–5	Crisler Center (12,707); Ann Arbor, MI
Dec 19, 2018*; 7:00 pm, ESPN+		at Dayton	L 72–85	5–6	UD Arena (12,590); Dayton, OH
Dec 22, 2018*; 3:00 pm, ESPN3		Milwaukee	L 66–67	5–7	University Arena (2,078); Kalamazoo, MI
Dec 30, 2018*; 4:00 pm, ESPN3		UC Riverside	W 73–64	6–7	University Arena (2,085); Kalamazoo, MI
MAC regular season
Jan 5, 2019; 2:00 pm, ESPN3		at Akron	L 48–56	6–8 (0–1)	James A. Rhodes Arena (2,276); Akron, OH
Jan 8, 2019; 7:00 pm		at Kent State	L 73–88	6–9 (0–2)	MAC Center (1,895); Kent, OH
Jan 12, 2019; 7:00 pm		Toledo	L 77–85	6–10 (0–3)	University Arena (2,310); Kalamazoo, MI
Jan 15, 2019; 7:00 pm, ESPN+		No. 16 Buffalo	L 79–88	6–11 (0–4)	University Arena (2,179); Kalamazoo, MI
Jan 19, 2019; 6:00 pm, ESPN3		at Bowling Green	L 48–79	6–12 (0–5)	Stroh Center (2,467); Bowling Green, OH
Jan 22, 2019; 7:00 pm, ESPN+		at Ohio	L 76–81	6–13 (0–6)	Convocation Center (6,029); Athens, OH
Jan 26, 2019; 2:00 pm, ESPN+		Eastern Michigan; Michigan MAC Trophy	L 67–93	6–14 (0–7)	University Arena (2,514); Kalamazoo, MI
Feb 2, 2019; 4:30 pm, ESPN+		at Central Michigan; Michigan MAC Trophy	L 64–85	6–15 (0–8)	McGuirk Arena (3,325); Mount Pleasant, MI
Feb 5, 2019; 7:00 pm, ESPN+		Bowling Green	L 72–85	6–16 (0–9)	University Arena (1,831); Kalamazoo, MI
Feb 9, 2019; 2:00 pm, ESPN+		at Ball State	L 59–79	6–17 (0–10)	Worthen Arena (4,312); Muncie, IN
Feb 12, 2019; 7:00 pm, ESPN+		Northern Illinois	W 76–74	7–17 (1–10)	University Arena (1,760); Kalamazoo, MI
Feb 14, 2019; 7:00 pm, ESPN+		Kent State	L 63–82	7–18 (1–11)	University Arena (1,683); Kalamazoo, MI
Feb 16, 2019; 2:00 pm, ESPN3		Miami (OH)	W 84–79	8–18 (2–11)	University Arena (2,127); Kalamazoo, MI
Feb 23, 2019; 2:00 pm, ESPN+		at Eastern Michigan; Michigan MAC Trophy	L 76–77	8–19 (2–12)	Convocation Center (2,068); Ypsilanti, MI
Feb 26, 2019; 8:00 pm, ESPN+		at Northern Illinois	L 65–70	8–20 (2–13)	Convocation Center (1,115); DeKalb, IL
Mar 2, 2019; 4:00 pm, ESPN+		Ball State	L 58–60	8–21 (2–14)	University Arena (2,441); Kalamazoo, MI
Mar 5, 2019; 7:00 pm, ESPN+		at Toledo	L 57–76	8–22 (2–15)	Savage Arena (4,233); Toledo, OH
Mar 8, 2019; 7:00 pm, ESPN+		Central Michigan; Michigan MAC Trophy	L 75–82	8–23 (2–16)	University Arena (2,686); Kalamazoo, MI
MAC tournament
Mar 11, 2019; 7:00 pm, ESPN+	(12)	at (5) Central Michigan; First Round	L 67–81	8–24	McGuirk Arena (2,211); Mt. Pleasant, MI
*Non-conference game. ^{#}Rankings from AP Poll. (#) Tournament seedings in parentheses. All times are in Eastern Time Zone.

== See also ==
- 2018–19 Western Michigan Broncos women's basketball team
