= 2019 MAC men's basketball tournament =

- Classification: Division I
- Season: 2018–19
- Teams: 12
- Site: Quicken Loans Arena; Cleveland, Ohio
- First round site: Campus sites
- Champions: Buffalo (4th title)
- Winning coach: Nate Oats (3rd title)
- MVP: Jeremy Harris (Buffalo)
- Television: CBSSN, ESPN2, ESPN+, FCS
- MAC men's basketball tournaments

2018–19 Mid-American Conference men's basketball standings
	Conf.				Overall
Team	W		L	PCT	W		L	PCT
East
No. 15 Buffalo †	16	–	2	.889	32	–	4	.889
Bowling Green	12	–	6	.667	22	–	12	.647
Kent State	11	–	7	.611	22	–	11	.667
Akron	8	–	10	.444	17	–	16	.515
Miami (OH)	7	–	11	.389	15	–	17	.469
Ohio	6	–	12	.333	14	–	17	.452
West
Toledo	13	–	5	.722	25	–	8	.758
Central Michigan	10	–	8	.556	23	–	12	.657
Eastern Michigan	9	–	9	.500	15	–	17	.469
Northern Illinois	8	–	10	.444	17	–	17	.500
Ball State	6	–	12	.333	16	–	17	.485
Western Michigan	2	–	16	.111	8	–	24	.250
† 2019 MAC tournament winner Rankings from AP Poll

The 2019 Mid-American Conference men's basketball tournament was the postseason men's basketball tournament for the Mid-American Conference (MAC). Tournament first-round games were held on campus sites at the higher seed on March 11. The remaining rounds were held at Quicken Loans Arena, now known as Rocket Mortgage FieldHouse, in Cleveland, Ohio March 14–16, 2019. Buffalo defeated Bowling Green in the championship game to become the 2019 MAC tournament champions, and received the conference's automatic bid to the 2019 NCAA tournament.

== Seeds ==
All 12 MAC teams participated in the tournament. Teams were seeded by record within the conference, with a tiebreaker system to seed teams with identical conference records. The top four teams received a bye to the quarterfinals.

Seed	School	Conference record	Division	Tiebreaker
1	Buffalo	16–2	East	
2	Toledo	13–5	West	
3	Bowling Green	12–6	East	
4	Kent State	11–7	East	
5	Central Michigan	10–8	West	
6	Eastern Michigan	9–9	West	
7	Northern Illinois	8–10	West	No. 1: 1–1 vs. Akron; No. 2: 1–0 (1.000) vs. No. 1 UB
8	Akron	8–10	East	No. 1: 1–1 vs. NIU; No. 2: 0–2 (.000) vs. No. 1 UB
9	Miami (OH)	7–11	East	
10	Ohio	6–12	East	2–0 vs. BSU
11	Ball State	6–12	West	0–2 vs. Ohio
12	Western Michigan	2–16	West	

== Schedule ==
Game	Time	Matchup	Score	Television
First round – Monday March 11 – Campus sites
1	8:00 pm	No. 9 Miami (OH) at No. 8 Akron	51–80	ESPN+
2	7:00 pm	No. 12 Western Michigan at No. 5 Central Michigan	67–81	ESPN+
3	9:00 pm	No. 10 Ohio at No. 7 Northern Illinois	61–80	ESPN+
4	7:00 pm	No. 11 Ball State at No. 6 Eastern Michigan	61–43	ESPN+
Quarterfinals – Thursday March 14 – Quicken Loans Arena, Cleveland, OH
5	12:00 pm	No. 8 Akron vs. No. 1 Buffalo	46–82	ESPN+
6	2:30 pm	No. 5 Central Michigan vs. No. 4 Kent State	89–81	ESPN+
7	6:30 pm	No. 7 Northern Illinois vs No. 2 Toledo	80–76	ESPN+
8	9:00 pm	No. 11 Ball State vs. No. 3 Bowling Green	86–99	ESPN+
Semifinals – Friday March 15 – Quicken Loans Arena, Cleveland, OH
9	6:30 pm	No. 5 Central Michigan vs. No. 1 Buffalo	81–85	CBSSN
10	9:00 pm	No. 7 Northern Illinois vs. No. 3 Bowling Green	67–71	Fox College Sports
Championship – Saturday March 16 – Quicken Loans Arena, Cleveland, OH
11	7:30 pm	No. 3 Bowling Green vs. No. 1 Buffalo	73–87	ESPN2/WatchESPN
Game times in ET. Rankings denote tournament seed

== Bracket ==
First round Monday, March 11
8	Akron	80
9	Miami (OH)	51
5	Central Michigan	81
12	Western Michigan	67
7	Northern Illinois	80
10	Ohio	61
6	Eastern Michigan	43
11	Ball State	61

Quarterfinals; Thursday, March 14
1	Buffalo	82
8	Akron	46
4	Kent State	81
5	Central Michigan	89
2	Toledo	76
7	Northern Illinois	80
3	Bowling Green	99
11	Ball State	86

Semifinals; Friday, March 15
1	Buffalo	85
5	Central Michigan	81
7	Northern Illinois	67
3	Bowling Green	71

Championship; Saturday, March 16
1	Buffalo	87
3	Bowling Green	73

* denotes overtime period

== All-Tournament Team ==
Tournament MVP – Jeremy Harris, Buffalo

Player	Team
CJ Massinburg	Buffalo
Jeremy Harris	Buffalo
Demajeo Wiggins	Bowling Green
Dylan Frye	Bowling Green
Eugene German	Northern Illinois
