= 2018–19 Bowling Green Falcons men's basketball team =

American college basketball season

2018–19 Bowling Green Falcons men's basketball
- Conference: Mid-American Conference
- East Division
- Record: 22–12 (12–6 MAC)
- Head coach: Michael Huger (4th season)
- Assistant coaches: Anthony Stacey; Mike Summey; Kevin Noon
- Home arena: Stroh Center

2018–19 Mid-American Conference men's basketball standings
	Conf.				Overall
Team	W		L	PCT	W		L	PCT
East
No. 15 Buffalo †	16	–	2	.889	32	–	4	.889
Bowling Green	12	–	6	.667	22	–	12	.647
Kent State	11	–	7	.611	22	–	11	.667
Akron	8	–	10	.444	17	–	16	.515
Miami (OH)	7	–	11	.389	15	–	17	.469
Ohio	6	–	12	.333	14	–	17	.452
West
Toledo	13	–	5	.722	25	–	8	.758
Central Michigan	10	–	8	.556	23	–	12	.657
Eastern Michigan	9	–	9	.500	15	–	17	.469
Northern Illinois	8	–	10	.444	17	–	17	.500
Ball State	6	–	12	.333	16	–	17	.485
Western Michigan	2	–	16	.111	8	–	24	.250
† 2019 MAC tournament winner Rankings from AP Poll

The 2018–19 Bowling Green Falcons men's basketball team represented Bowling Green State University during the 2017–18 NCAA Division I men's basketball season. The Falcons were led by fourth-year head coach Michael Huger, and played their home games at the Stroh Center as members of the East Division of the Mid-American Conference. They finished the season 22–12 overall, 12–6 in MAC play to finish second place in the East Division. As the No. 3 seed in the MAC tournament, they advanced to the championship game, where they were defeated by Buffalo. They declined any offer to play in a postseason tournament.

== Previous season ==
The Falcons finished the 2017–18 season 16–16, 7–11 in MAC play to finish in a tie for fourth place. As the No. 9 seed in the MAC tournament, they lost in the first round to Central Michigan.

== Roster ==
2018–19 Bowling Green Falcons men's basketball team
Players
Coaches

Pos.	#	Name	Height	Weight	Year	Previous school	Hometown
G	0	Michael Laster	6 ft 1 in (1.85 m)	175 lb (79 kg)	Jr	Institute of Collaborative Education; Central Georgia Tech	Manhattan, NY
F	1	Demajeo Wiggins	6 ft 10 in (2.08 m)	240 lb (109 kg)	Sr	Springfield HS	Toledo, OH
C	2	Tayler Mattos	6 ft 11 in (2.11 m)	240 lb (109 kg)	Fr	Kearsarge	New London, NH
G	3	Caleb Fields	6 ft 2 in (1.88 m)	185 lb (84 kg)	Fr	Wildwood Catholic	Cape May Court House, NJ
	5	Dylan Frye	6 ft 2 in (1.88 m)	185 lb (84 kg)	Jr	Mater Academy	Miami, FL
G	10	Justin Turner	6 ft 4 in (1.93 m)	205 lb (93 kg)	RS So	Renaissance	Detroit, Michigan / Detroit, MI
G	15	Ethan Good (W)	6 ft 1 in (1.85 m)	180 lb (82 kg)	Jr	Wapakoneta HS	Wapakoneta, OH
F	21	Matiss Kulackovskis	6 ft 9 in (2.06 m)	215 lb (98 kg)	RS Fr	Archbishop Ryan	Saldus, Latvia
F	22	Marlon Sierra	6 ft 7 in (2.01 m)	225 lb (102 kg)	Jr	Miami Senior; Western Nebraska	Miami, FL
G	23	De Andre' Austin (W)	5 ft 9 in (1.75 m)	155 lb (70 kg)	Sr	University School; Wooster	Warrensville Heights, OH
G/F	25	Daeqwon Plowden	6 ft 6 in (1.98 m)	210 lb (95 kg)	So	Mastery Charter North	Philadelphia, PA
G	52	Joniya Gadson	6 ft 10 in (2.08 m)	245 lb (111 kg)	So	Dillard HS	Miami Gardens, FL

Head coach

- Michael Huger (Bowling Green)

Assistant coach(es)

- Anthony Stacey (Bowling Green)
- Mike Summey (NC State)
- Kevin Noon (Rider/Bowling Green)

Legend

- (C) Team captain
- (S) Suspended
- (I) Ineligible
- (W) Walk-on
- Injured
- Current redshirt

Roster
Last update: November 4, 2018

== Schedule and results ==
The 2018-19 schedule was released on August 1, 2018. The Falcons will participate in the Legends Classic, competing in the Detroit Subregional.

Date time, TV	Rank^{#}	Opponent^{#}	Result	Record	Site (attendance) city, state
Exhibition
Nov 1, 2018*; 6:00pm, FAA		Bluffton	W 86–50		Stroh Center (1,267); Bowling Green, OH
Non-conference regular season
Nov 6, 2018*; 7:00pm, FAA		Tiffin	W 91–52	1–0	Stroh Center (1,374); Bowling Green, OH
Nov 9, 2018*; 6:30pm, FS2		at St. John's; Legends Classic campus-site game	L 80–84	1–1	Carnesecca Arena (5,174); Queens, NY
Nov 12, 2018*; 7:00pm, MASN / ESPN+		at VCU; Legends Classic campus-site game	L 61–72	1–2	Stuart C. Siegel Center (7,637); Richmond, VA
Nov 15, 2018*; 7:00pm, ESPN3		North Carolina Central	W 75–60	2–2	Stroh Center (1,363); Bowling Green, OH
Nov 19, 2018*; 5:00pm, FloHoops		vs. Hampton; Legends Classic	W 81–79	3–2	Calihan Hall; Detroit, MI
Nov 20, 2018*; 7:30pm, FloHoops		at Detroit; Legends Classic	L 67–82	3–3	Calihan Hall (1,367); Detroit, MI
Nov 25, 2018*; 3:00pm, ESPN+		Drexel	W 81–71	4–3	Stroh Center (1,410); Bowling Green, OH
Dec 1, 2018*; 2:00pm		at Hartford	L 63–76	4–4	Chase Arena at Reich Family Pavilion (732); West Hartford, CT
Dec 5, 2018*; 7:30pm, ESPN+		at Cleveland State	L 64–82	4–5	Wolstein Center (1,322); Cleveland, OH
Dec 8, 2018*; 6:00pm, ESPN+		Green Bay	W 97–68	5–5	Stroh Center (1,911); Bowling Green, OH
Dec 16, 2018*; 4:00pm, ESPN3		Findlay	W 82–57	6–5	Stroh Center (2,426); Bowling Green, OH
Dec 21, 2018*; 1:00pm, FAA		Western Carolina	W 73–52	7–5	Stroh Center (1,715); Bowling Green, OH
Dec 30, 2018*; 2:30pm, FAA		UT Martin	W 94–80	8–5	Stroh Center; Bowling Green, OH
MAC regular season
Jan 5, 2019; 7:00pm, ESPN3		at Kent State	W 86–64	9–5 (1–0)	Memorial Athletic and Convocation Center (2,843); Kent, OH
Jan 8, 2019; 7:00pm, ESPN+		Ohio	W 82–63	10–5 (2–0)	Stroh Center (1,442); Bowling Green, OH
Jan 12, 2019; 4:30pm		at Central Michigan	W 97–87 ^{OT}	11–5 (3–0)	McGuirk Arena (3,315); Mount Pleasant, MI
Jan 15, 2019; 7:00pm, ESPN+		Ball State	W 79–78	12–5 (4–0)	Stroh Center (1,507); Bowling Green, OH
Jan 19, 2019; 6:00pm, ESPN3		Western Michigan	W 79–48	13–5 (5–0)	Stroh Center (2,467); Bowling Green, OH
Jan 22, 2019; 7:00pm, ESPN3		at Eastern Michigan	W 80–67	14–5 (6–0)	Convocation Center (1,509); Ypsilanti, MI
Jan 26, 2019; 3:30pm, ESPN3		at Miami (OH)	L 53–67	14–6 (6–1)	Millett Hall (2,257); Oxford, OH
Feb 2, 2019; 6:00pm, CBSSN		No. 18 Buffalo	W 92–88	15–6 (7–1)	Stroh Center (5,000); Bowling Green, OH
Feb 5, 2019; 7:00pm, ESPN+		at Western Michigan	W 85–72	16–6 (8–1)	University Arena (1,831); Kalamazoo, MI
Feb 9, 2019; 6:00pm, ESPN3		Toledo	L 71–78	16–7 (8–2)	Stroh Center (5,000); Bowling Green, OH
Feb 12, 2019; 7:00pm, ESPN+		Central Michigan	W 79–72	17–7 (9–2)	Stroh Center (1,445); Bowling Green, OH
Feb 16, 2019; 4:30pm, ESPN3		at Northern Illinois	W 87–67	18–7 (10–2)	Convocation Center (2,869); DeKalb, IL
Feb 19, 2019; 7:00pm, ESPN+		Akron	W 73–69	19–7 (11–2)	Stroh Center (1,954); Bowling Green, OH
Feb 23, 2019; 2:00pm, CBSSN		at Ohio	L 87–92 ^{OT}	19–8 (11–3)	Convocation Center (6,008); Athens, OH
Feb 26, 2019; 7:00pm, ESPN+		Miami	L 69–82	19–9 (11–4)	Stroh Center (2,225); Bowling Green, OH
Mar 2, 2019; 4:00pm, CBSSN		Kent State	W 77–72	20–9 (12–4)	Stroh Center (3,011); Bowling Green, OH
Mar 5, 2019; 7:00pm, ESPN+		at Akron	L 67–91	20–10 (12–5)	James A. Rhodes Arena (2,902); Akron, OH
Mar 8, 2019; 7:00pm, ESPN3/ESPN+		at No. 19 Buffalo	L 73–84	20–11 (12–6)	Alumni Arena (6,709); Amherst, NY
MAC tournament
Mar 14, 2019; 9:00pm, ESPN+	(3)	vs. (11) Ball State; Quarterfinals	W 99–86	21–11	Quicken Loans Arena; Cleveland, OH
Mar 15, 2019; 9:00pm, FCS	(3)	vs. (7) Northern Illinois; Semifinals	W 71–67	22–11	Quicken Loans Arena; Cleveland, OH
Mar 16, 2019; 7:30pm, ESPN2	(3)	vs. (1) No. 18 Buffalo; Championship	L 73–87	22–12	Quicken Loans Arena; Cleveland, OH
*Non-conference game. ^{#}Rankings from AP Poll. (#) Tournament seedings in parentheses. All times are in Eastern Time.

== See also ==
2018–19 Bowling Green Falcons women's basketball team
