= 2018–19 Ohio Bobcats men's basketball team =

American college basketball season

2018–19 Ohio Bobcats men's basketball
- Conference: Mid-American Conference
- East Division
- Record: 14–17 (6–12 MAC)
- Head coach: Saul Phillips (5th season)
- Assistant coaches: Will Ryan; Jason Kemp; Jared Swanson
- Home arena: Convocation Center

2018–19 Mid-American Conference men's basketball standings
	Conf.				Overall
Team	W		L	PCT	W		L	PCT
East
No. 15 Buffalo †	16	–	2	.889	32	–	4	.889
Bowling Green	12	–	6	.667	22	–	12	.647
Kent State	11	–	7	.611	22	–	11	.667
Akron	8	–	10	.444	17	–	16	.515
Miami (OH)	7	–	11	.389	15	–	17	.469
Ohio	6	–	12	.333	14	–	17	.452
West
Toledo	13	–	5	.722	25	–	8	.758
Central Michigan	10	–	8	.556	23	–	12	.657
Eastern Michigan	9	–	9	.500	15	–	17	.469
Northern Illinois	8	–	10	.444	17	–	17	.500
Ball State	6	–	12	.333	16	–	17	.485
Western Michigan	2	–	16	.111	8	–	24	.250
† 2019 MAC tournament winner Rankings from AP Poll

The 2018–19 Ohio Bobcats men's basketball team represented Ohio University during the 2018–19 NCAA Division I men's basketball season. The Bobcats, led by fifth-year head coach Saul Phillips, played their home games at the Convocation Center in Athens, Ohio as a member of the East Division of the Mid-American Conference. In non-conference play they had wins over eventual MAAC champion Iona, and both co-champions of the Big South in Radford and Campbell as well as a win over their rival and eventual CIT champion Marshall. They finished the season 14–17 overall, 6–12 in MAC play to finish in last place in the East Division. As the No. 10 seed in the MAC tournament, they were defeated in the first round by Northern Illinois.

On March 13, 2019, head coach Saul Phillips was fired. He finished his five-year tenure at Ohio with an 81–77 overall record. Five days later, the school named Ohio alum Jeff Boals, head coach at Stony Brook, as their new head coach.

== Previous season ==
The Bobcats finished the 2017–18 season 14–17, 7–11 in MAC play to finish in a tie for fourth place in the East Division. They lost in the first round of the MAC tournament to Miami (OH).

== Offseason ==
=== Departures ===
Departures
Name	Number	Pos.	Height	Weight	Year	Hometown	Reason
Zach Butler	0	G	6'3"	193	Freshman	Spartanburg, SC	Transferred to Florida SouthWestern State College
Antonio Bisutti	10	G	6'2"	192	Senior	Dublin, OH	Graduated

== Roster ==
2018–19 Ohio Bobcats men's basketball team
Players
Coaches

Pos.	#	Name	Height	Weight	Year	Previous school	Hometown
G	0	Jason Preston	6 ft 4 in (1.93 m)	187 lb (85 kg)	Fr	Believe Sports Academy	Orlando, FL
F	1	Jason Carter	6 ft 8 in (2.03 m)	227 lb (103 kg)	RS So	Johnstown-Monroe	Johnstown, OH
F	2	Nate Springs	6 ft 10 in (2.08 m)	—	RS Fr	United Faith Christian Academy	Charlotte, NC
G	3	James Gollon	6 ft 5 in (1.96 m)	—	RS Jr	Pacelli	Stevens Point, WI
G	4	Teyvion Kirk	6 ft 4 in (1.93 m)	185 lb (84 kg)	So	Joliet West HS	Joliet, IL
F	5	Ben Vander Plas	6 ft 8 in (2.03 m)	232 lb (105 kg)	RS Fr	Ripon	Ripon, WI
G	10	Connor Murrell	6 ft 7 in (2.01 m)	215 lb (98 kg)	RS So	Sioux City East	Sioux City, IA
G	11	Torey James	6 ft 5 in (1.96 m)	—	Fr	Hickory	Hickory, NC
G	12	John Tenerowicz (W)	6 ft 1 in (1.85 m)	185 lb (84 kg)	Fr	St. Ignatius	Cleveland, OH
F	14	Chris McGraw (W)	5 ft 11 in (1.8 m)	—	Fr	Bishop Watterson	Columbus, OH
F	21	Jarrell Reeves (W)	6 ft 5 in (1.96 m)	—	RS So	Blackman	Murfreesboro, TN
G/F	22	Gavin Block	6 ft 7 in (2.01 m)	209 lb (95 kg)	Sr	Lincoln Community High School	Lincoln, IL
G	23	Antonio Cowart Jr.	6 ft 2 in (1.88 m)	—	Jr	McComb	McComb, MS
F	24	Mason McMurray	6 ft 7 in (2.01 m)	220 lb (100 kg)	Fr	Stow-Munroe Falls	Stow, OH
G	35	Jordan Dartis	6 ft 3 in (1.91 m)	—	Sr	Northland High School	Newark, OH
F	45	Doug Taylor	6 ft 9 in (2.06 m)	258 lb (117 kg)	So	Northland High School	Columbus, OH

Head coach

- Saul Phillips (UW–Platteville)

Assistant coach(es)

- Will Ryan (Wisconsin)
- Jason Kemp (UW–La Crosse)
- Jared Swanson (Concordia-Moorhead)

Legend

- (C) Team captain
- (S) Suspended
- (I) Ineligible
- (W) Walk-on
- Injured
- Current redshirt

Roster

== Preseason ==
The preseason poll and league awards were announced by the league office on October 30, 2019. Ohio was picked to finish fourth and had no members of the preseason All-MAC team

=== Preseason men's basketball poll ===
(First place votes in parentheses)

==== East Division ====
1. Buffalo 210 (35)
2. Miami 127
3. Kent State 122
4. Ohio 121
5. Akron 97
6. Bowling Green 58

==== West Division ====
1. Eastern Michigan 183 (17)
2. Ball State 175 (11)
3. Toledo 156 (5)
4. Western Michigan 81 (1)
5. Northern Illinois 73
6. Central Michigan 67 (1)

==== Tournament Champs ====
Buffalo (25), Eastern Michigan (3), Toledo (3), Central Michigan (1), Miami (1), Northern Illinois (1), Western Michigan (1)

== Schedule and results ==
Date time, TV	Rank^{#}	Opponent^{#}	Result	Record	Site (attendance) city, state
Exhibition
November 3, 2018; 3:30 pm		Rio Grande	W 93–58		Convocation Center; Athens, OH
Non-conference regular season
November 7, 2018*; 7:00 pm, ESPN3		Wilberforce	W 97–61	1–0	Convocation Center (4,032); Athens, OH
November 12, 2018*; 7:00 pm, ESPN3		Campbell; Jamaica Classic campus game	W 81–73	2–0	Convocation Center (4,312); Athens, OH
November 16, 2017*; 4:30 pm		vs. South Florida; Jamaica Classic	L 46–73	2–1	Montego Bay Convention Centre; Montego Bay, Jamaica
November 18, 2018*; 6:30 pm		vs. Loyola Marymount; Jamaica Classic	L 56–65	2–2	Montego Bay Convention Centre; Montego Bay, Jamaica
November 24, 2018*; 2:00 pm		Austin Peay; Jamaica Classic campus game	W 85–82 ^{OT}	3–2	Convocation Center (3,474); Athens, OH
November 27, 2018*; 7:00 pm, ESPN+		Iona	W 89–65	4–2	Convocation Center (5,227); Athens, OH
December 1, 2018*; 3:30 pm, ESPN+		Marshall	W 101-84	5–2	Convocation Center (6,301); Athens, OH
December 5, 2018*; 6:30 pm, FS1		at Xavier	L 61–82	5–3	Cintas Center (10,405); Cincinnati, OH
December 8, 2018*; 3:30 pm, ESPN3		Radford	W 78–69	6–3	Convocation Center (5,974); Athens, OH
December 15, 2018*; 1:00 pm		at Detroit Mercy	W 63–61	7–3	Calihan Hall (1,656); Detroit, MI
December 20, 2018*; 7:00 pm, BTN		at Purdue	L 67–95	7–4	Mackey Arena (13,840); West Lafayette, IN
December 30, 2018*; 2:00 pm		Florida International	W 68-66	8-4	Convocation Center (3,451); Athens, OH
MAC regular season
January 5, 2019; 2:00 pm, ESPN3		Northern Illinois	L 66-72 ^{OT}	8-5 (0-1)	Convocation Center (5,121); Athens, OH
January 8, 2019; 7:00 pm, ESPN+		at Bowling Green	L 63-82	8-6 (0-2)	Stroh Center (1,442); Bowling Green, OH
January 12, 2019; 7:00 pm, ESPN+		at Ball State	W 70-52	9-6 (1-2)	Worthen Arena (4,076); Muncie, IN
January 15, 2019; 7:00 pm, ESPN+		Kent State	L 52-66	9-7 (1-3)	Convocation Center (6,560); Athens, OH
January 18, 2019; 7:00 pm, CBSSN		at Toledo	L 52-75	9-8 (1-4)	Savage Arena (5,037); Toledo, OH
January 22, 2019; 7:00 pm, ESPN+		Western Michigan	W 81-76	10-8 (2-4)	Convocation Center (6,029); Athens, OH
January 26, 2019; 7:00 pm, ESPN3		Ball State	W 78-74	11-8 (3-4)	Convocation Center (6,556); Athens, OH
January 29, 2019; 6:00 pm		Northern Illinois	L 60-71	11-9 (3-5)	NIU Convocation Center (737); Athens, OH
February 2, 2019; 3:30 pm, ESPN+		Akron	L 53-65	11-10 (3-6)	Convocation Center (7,887); Athens, OH
February 9, 2019; 7:00 pm, ESPN+		at Miami (OH)	L 59-79	11-11 (3-7)	Millett Hall (2,319); Oxford, OH
February 12, 2019; 7:00 pm, ESPN+		Kent State	L 57-66	11-12 (3-8)	Convocation Center (5,522); Athens, OH
February 16, 2019; 4:30 pm, ESPN+		at Central Michigan	L 80-87	11-13 (3-9)	McGuirk Arena (2,466); Mount Pleasant, MI
February 19, 2019; 7:00 pm, ESPN+		No. 25 Buffalo	L 67-114	11-14 (3-10)	Alumni Arena; Amherst, NY
February 22, 2019; 6:30 pm, CBSSN		Bowling Green	W 92-87 ^{OT}	12-14 (4-10)	Convocation Center (6,008); Athens, OH
February 26, 2019; 4:30 pm, ESPN+		at Kent State	L 73-78	12-15 (4-11)	Memorial Athletic and Convocation Center (2,891); Kent, OH
March 2, 2019; 2:00 pm, ESPN+		at Akron	W 73-49	13-15 (5-11)	James A. Rhodes Arena (2,714); Akron, OH
March 5, 2019; 7:00 pm, ESPN+		No. 19 Buffalo	L 79-82	13-16 (5-12)	Convocation Center (5,834); Athens, OH
March 8, 2019; 7:00 pm, ESPN+		Miami (OH)	W 66–57	14–16 (6–12)	Convocation Center; Athens, OH
MAC tournament
March 11, 2019; 9:00 pm, ESPN+	(10)	at (7) Northern Illinois; First round	L 61–80	14–17	Convocation Center (1,070); DeKalb, IL
*Non-conference game. ^{#}Rankings from AP Poll. (#) Tournament seedings in parentheses. All times are in Eastern Time.

== Statistics ==
=== Team statistics ===
Final 2018–19 statistics

Record	Ohio	OPP
Scoring	2174	2288
Scoring Average	70.13	73.81
Field goals – Att	803–1838	812–1861
3-pt. Field goals – Att	187–633	260–727
Free throws – Att	381–602	404–572
Rebounds	1152	1114
Assists	451	417
Turnovers	448	416
Steals	200	238
Blocked Shots	115	73

=== Player statistics ===
			Minutes		Scoring		Total FGs			3-point FGs			Free-Throws			Rebounds								
Player	GP	GS	Tot	Avg	Pts	Avg	FG	FGA	Pct	3FG	3FA	Pct	FT	FTA	Pct	Off	Def	Tot	Avg	A	PF	TO	Stl	Blk
Jason Carter	31	31	962	31	510	16.5	180	374	0.481	23	67	0.343	127	177	0.718	65	143	208	6.7	61	77	55	20	21
Teyvion Kirk	31	30	945	30.5	436	14.1	174	415	0.419	10	47	0.213	78	148	0.527	47	125	172	5.5	76	84	137	41	5
Doug Taylor	31	31	779	25.1	267	8.6	105	169	0.621	1	4	0.25	56	98	0.571	82	128	210	6.8	15	98	46	25	56
Ben Vander Plas	31	2	719	23.2	267	8.6	94	231	0.407	50	162	0.309	29	41	0.707	40	122	162	5.2	48	55	33	28	15
Gavin Block	31	15	724	23.4	194	6.3	62	167	0.371	46	130	0.354	24	41	0.585	13	51	64	2.1	68	50	40	25	5
Jason Preston	30	21	886	29.5	180	6	72	166	0.434	10	48	0.208	26	34	0.765	21	86	107	3.6	103	31	37	25	3
Antonio Cowart Jr	31	24	812	26.2	173	5.6	64	173	0.37	30	104	0.288	15	22	0.682	20	84	104	3.4	51	62	60	25	4
Connor Murrell	25	0	234	9.4	78	3.1	29	80	0.363	8	33	0.242	12	21	0.571	6	19	25	1	13	22	16	6	2
James Gollon	6	0	72	12	35	5.8	10	20	0.5	6	13	0.462	9	11	0.818	0	6	6	1	5	6	8	3	1
Mason McMurray	9	0	53	5.9	13	1.4	5	14	0.357	1	9	0.111	2	2	1	3	6	9	1	5	9	4	1	1
Torey James	14	0	67	4.8	11	0.8	4	22	0.182	2	15	0.133	1	3	0.333	2	7	9	0.6	5	9	4	1	0
Jarrell Reeves	6	0	9	1.5	8	1.3	4	5	0.8	0	0	0	0	2	0	3	2	5	0.8	0	1	0	0	2
John Tenerowicz	4	0	6	1.5	2	0.5	0	1	0	0	1	0	2	2	1	0	1	1	0.3	1	0	0	0	0
Chris McGraw	4	0	6	1.5	0	0	0	1	0	0	0	0	0	0	0	0	0	0	0	0	0	2	0	0
Total	31	-	6275	-	2174	70.1	803	1838	0.437	187	633	0.295	381	602	0.633	332	820	1152	37.2	451	504	448	200	115
Opponents	31	-	6275	-	2288	73.8	812	1861	0.436	260	727	0.358	404	572	0.706	300	814	1114	35.9	417	558	416	238	73

Legend
GP	Games played	GS	Games started	Avg	Average per game
FG	Field-goals made	FGA	Field-goal attempts	Off	Offensive rebounds
Def	Defensive rebounds	A	Assists	TO	Turnovers
Blk	Blocks	Stl	Steals	High	Team high

== Awards and honors ==
=== All-MAC Awards ===
Postseason All-MAC teams
Team	Player	Position	Year
All-MAC Third Team	Jason Carter	F	RS-So.
All-MAC Freshman Team	Ben Vander Plas	F	RS-Fr.
All-MAC Freshman Team	Jason Preston	G	Fr.

== See also ==
- 2018–19 Ohio Bobcats women's basketball team
