= 2018–19 Kent State Golden Flashes men's basketball team =

American college basketball season

2018–19 Kent State Golden Flashes men's basketball

CIT, First round
- Conference: Mid-American Conference
- East Division
- Record: 22–11 (11–7 MAC)
- Head coach: Rob Senderoff (8th season)
- Assistant coaches: Eric Haut; Matt Sligh; Julian Sullinger
- Home arena: MAC Center

2018–19 Mid-American Conference men's basketball standings
	Conf.				Overall
Team	W		L	PCT	W		L	PCT
East
No. 15 Buffalo †	16	–	2	.889	32	–	4	.889
Bowling Green	12	–	6	.667	22	–	12	.647
Kent State	11	–	7	.611	22	–	11	.667
Akron	8	–	10	.444	17	–	16	.515
Miami (OH)	7	–	11	.389	15	–	17	.469
Ohio	6	–	12	.333	14	–	17	.452
West
Toledo	13	–	5	.722	25	–	8	.758
Central Michigan	10	–	8	.556	23	–	12	.657
Eastern Michigan	9	–	9	.500	15	–	17	.469
Northern Illinois	8	–	10	.444	17	–	17	.500
Ball State	6	–	12	.333	16	–	17	.485
Western Michigan	2	–	16	.111	8	–	24	.250
† 2019 MAC tournament winner Rankings from AP Poll

The 2018–19 Kent State Golden Flashes men's basketball team represented Kent State University during the 2018–19 NCAA Division I men's basketball season. The Golden Flashes, led by eighth-year head coach Rob Senderoff, played their home games at the Memorial Athletic and Convocation Center, also known as the MAC Center, as members of the East Division of the Mid-American Conference. They finished the season 22–11, 11–7 in MAC play to finish in third place in the East Division. They lost in the quarterfinals of the MAC tournament to Central Michigan. They were invited to the CollegeInsider.com Tournament where they lost in the first round to Louisiana–Monroe.

== Previous season ==
In the 2017–18 season, the Golden Flashes finished the season 17–17, 9–9 in MAC play to finish in second place in the MAC East division. They defeated Northern Illinois and Ball State in the MAC tournament before losing to Buffalo in the semifinals.

== Roster ==
2018–19 Kent State Golden Flashes men's basketball team
Players
Coaches

Pos.	#	Name	Height	Weight	Year	Previous school	Hometown
G	0	Jalen Avery	6 ft 0 in (1.83 m)	186 lb (84 kg)	Sr	Shroder HS	Covington, KY
G	1	CJ Williamson	6 ft 6 in (1.98 m)	200 lb (91 kg)	Jr	Evans; Texas Tech; Chipola College	Orlando, FL
F	2	BJ Duling	6 ft 7 in (2.01 m)	235 lb (107 kg)	So	Newark HS	Newark, OH
F	3	Akiean Frederick	6 ft 9 in (2.06 m)	231 lb (105 kg)	Sr	Franklin Heights; Sinclair CC	Columbus, OH
G	4	Antonio Williams	6 ft 0 in (1.83 m)	185 lb (84 kg)	Jr	Proviso East; Indian Hills CC	Chicago, IL
F	5	Danny Pippen (injured) (redshirt)	6 ft 9 in (2.06 m)	222 lb (101 kg)	Jr	Allen Academy	Detroit, MI
G	11	Kain Harris	6 ft 4 in (1.93 m)	200 lb (91 kg)	Jr	St. Rita of Cascia; Tulane	Chicago, IL
G	13	Mitch Peterson	6 ft 5 in (1.96 m)	199 lb (90 kg)	Jr	Walsh Jesuit	Richfield, OH
G	14	Sam Norton	6 ft 0 in (1.83 m)	160 lb (73 kg)	Fr	Mooresville HS	Mooresville, IN
G	15	Anthony Roberts	6 ft 4 in (1.93 m)	190 lb (86 kg)	Fr	Henry Ford	Detroit, MI
C	20	Antonio Givens	6 ft 8 in (2.03 m)	260 lb (118 kg)	Jr	West HS; Wabash Valley College	Columbus, OH
G	22	DeAndre Gholston	6 ft 5 in (1.96 m)	170 lb (77 kg)	Fr	21st Century	Gary, IN
G	23	Jaylin Walker	6 ft 3 in (1.91 m)	187 lb (85 kg)	Sr	Romulus HS	Inkster, MI
F	25	Philip Whittington	6 ft 8 in (2.03 m)	227 lb (103 kg)	Jr	Northside HS; USC Upstate	Columbus, GA
G	31	Troy Simons	6 ft 3 in (1.91 m)	195 lb (88 kg)	Sr	Renaissance Christian Academy; Polk State College; New Mexico	Pittsburgh, PA

Head coach

- Rob Senderoff (Albany/Miami (FL))

Assistant coach(es)

- Eric Haut (Kent State)
- Matt Sligh (Northwest Missouri State)
- Julian Sullinger (Kent State)

Legend

- (C) Team captain
- (S) Suspended
- (I) Ineligible
- (W) Walk-on
- Injured
- Current redshirt

Roster
Last update: 4 November 2018

== Schedule and results ==
The 2018–19 schedule was released on August 1, 2018.

Date time, TV	Rank^{#}	Opponent^{#}	Result	Record	Site (attendance) city, state
Exhibition
Oct 21, 2018; 12:00pm		Robert Morris; Hurricane Relief Exhibition	W 89–62		MAC Center; Kent, OH
Non-conference regular season
Nov 10, 2018*; 7:00pm, ESPN3		at Cleveland State; Northeast Ohio Coaches vs Cancer Doubleheader	W 83–79	1–0	Wolstein Center (2,052); Cleveland, OH
Nov 13, 2018*; 7:00pm, ESPN+		Shawnee State	W 90–69	2–0	MAC Center (3,140); Kent, OH
Nov 16, 2018*; 7:00pm, ESPN3		Liberty	L 70–77	2–1	MAC Center (2,214); Kent, OH
Nov 18, 2018; 4:00pm, ESPN+		Alcorn State	W 79–48	3–1	MAC Center (2,031); Kent, OH
Nov 20, 2018*; 7:00pm, ESPN+		Savannah State	W 104–84	4–1	MAC Center (1,925); Kent, OH
Nov 23, 2018*; 5:00pm, SECN+		at Vanderbilt	W 77–75	5–1	Memorial Gymnasium (9,061); Nashville, TN
Nov 28, 2018*; 7:00pm, ESPN3		at Detroit Mercy	W 76–72	6–1	Calihan Hall (1,170); Detroit, MI
Dec 1, 2018*; 4:00pm, ESPN+		Norfolk State	W 78–67	7–1	MAC Center (1,927); Kent, OH
Dec 9, 2018*; 7:00pm, ESPN+		Wright State	W 83–76	8–1	MAC Center; Kent, OH
Dec 15, 2018*; 4:00pm, ACCRSN		at Louisville	L 70–83	8–2	KFC Yum! Center (15,117); Louisville, KY
Dec 21, 2018*; 3:00pm, P12N		at Oregon State	W 66–63	9–2	Gill Coliseum (4,587); Corvallis, OR
Dec 28, 2018*; 7:00pm, ESPN+		Albany	W 70–68	10–2	MAC Center (2,114); Kent, OH
Dec 31, 2018*; 2:00pm, ESPN+		Oberlin College	W 71–48	11–2	MAC Center (1,952); Kent, OH
MAC regular season
Jan 5, 2019; 7:00pm, ESPN3		Bowling Green	L 64–86	11–3 (0–1)	MAC Center (2,843); Kent, OH
Jan 8, 2019; 7:00pm, ESPN3		Western Michigan	W 88–73	12–3 (1–1)	MAC Center (1,895); Kent, OH
Jan 12, 2019; 12:00pm, ESPN+		at Eastern Michigan	L 61–95	12–4 (1–2)	Convocation Center (1,827); Ypsilanti, MI
Jan 15, 2019; 12:00pm, ESPN+		at Ohio	W 66–52	13–4 (2–2)	Convocation Center (6,560); Athens, OH
Jan 19, 2019; 7:00pm, ESPN3		Northern Illinois	W 78–68	14–4 (3–2)	MAC Center (2,291); Kent, OH
Jan 22, 2019; 7:00pm, ESPN+		Toledo	W 87–85 ^{OT}	15–4 (4–2)	MAC Center (2,205); Kent, OH
Jan 25, 2019; 6:30pm, CBSSN		No. 14-T Buffalo	L 79–88	15–5 (4–3)	MAC Center (5,133); Kent, OH
Feb 2, 2019; 12:00 pm, CBSSN		at Ball State	W 83–80	16–5 (5–3)	Worthen Arena (4,024); Muncie, IN
Feb 5, 2018; 7:00pm, ESPN+		Miami (OH)	W 70–67	17–5 (6–3)	MAC Center (2,236); Kent, OH
Feb 8, 2019; 9:00pm, ESPNU		at Akron	L 53–72	17–6 (6–4)	James A. Rhodes Arena (4,289); Akron, OH
Feb 14, 2019; 7:00pm, ESPN+		at Western Michigan	W 82–63	18–6 (7–4)	University Arena (1,683); Kalamazoo, MI
Feb 16, 2019; 7:00pm, ESPN+		Eastern Michigan	W 71–58	19–6 (8–4)	MAC Center (3,491); Kent, OH
Feb 19, 2019; 7:00pm, ESPN+		at Central Michigan	L 74–84	19–7 (8–5)	McGuirk Arena (1,875); Mount Pleasant, MI
Feb 22, 2019; 7:00pm, ESPN2		at No. 25 Buffalo	L 57–80	19–8 (8–6)	Alumni Arena (6,688); Amherst, NY
Feb 26, 2019; 7:00pm, ESPN+		Ohio	W 78–73	20–8 (9–6)	MAC Center (2,891); Kent, OH
Mar 2, 2019; 4:00pm, CBSSN		at Bowling Green	L 72–77	20–9 (9–7)	Stroh Center (3,011); Bowling Green, OH
Mar 5, 2019; 7:00pm, ESPN+		at Miami (OH)	W 75–66	21–9 (10–7)	Millett Hall (2,343); Oxford, OH
Mar 8, 2019; 7:00pm, CBSSN		Akron	W 68–65	22–9 (11–7)	MAC Center (6,168); Kent, OH
MAC tournament
Mar 14, 2019; 2:30pm, ESPN+	(4)	vs. (5) Central Michigan; Quarterfinals	L 81–89	22–10	Quicken Loans Arena; Cleveland, OH
CollegeInsider.com Postseason tournament
Mar 21, 2019*; 8:00pm		at Louisiana–Monroe; First round – Lou Henson Classic	L 77–87	22–11	Fant–Ewing Coliseum (5,742); Monroe, LA
*Non-conference game. ^{#}Rankings from AP Poll. (#) Tournament seedings in parentheses. All times are in Eastern Time.

== See also ==
- 2018–19 Kent State Golden Flashes women's basketball team
