= 2018–19 Akron Zips men's basketball team =

American college basketball season

2018–19 Akron Zips men's basketball
- Conference: Mid-American Conference
- East Division
- Record: 17–16 (8–10 MAC)
- Head coach: John Groce (2nd season)
- Associate head coach: Dustin Ford
- Assistant coaches: Rob Fulford; Robby Pridgen
- Home arena: James A. Rhodes Arena

2018–19 Mid-American Conference men's basketball standings
	Conf.				Overall
Team	W		L	PCT	W		L	PCT
East
No. 15 Buffalo †	16	–	2	.889	32	–	4	.889
Bowling Green	12	–	6	.667	22	–	12	.647
Kent State	11	–	7	.611	22	–	11	.667
Akron	8	–	10	.444	17	–	16	.515
Miami (OH)	7	–	11	.389	15	–	17	.469
Ohio	6	–	12	.333	14	–	17	.452
West
Toledo	13	–	5	.722	25	–	8	.758
Central Michigan	10	–	8	.556	23	–	12	.657
Eastern Michigan	9	–	9	.500	15	–	17	.469
Northern Illinois	8	–	10	.444	17	–	17	.500
Ball State	6	–	12	.333	16	–	17	.485
Western Michigan	2	–	16	.111	8	–	24	.250
† 2019 MAC tournament winner Rankings from AP Poll

The 2018–19 Akron Zips men's basketball team represented the University of Akron during the 2018–19 NCAA Division I men's basketball season. The Zips, led by second-year head coach John Groce, played their home games at the James A. Rhodes Arena as members of the East Division of the Mid-American Conference. They finished the season 17–16, 8–10 in MAC play to finish in fourth place in the East Division. They defeated Miami (OH) in the first round of the MAC tournament before losing in the quarterfinals to Buffalo.

== Previous season ==
The Zips finished the 2017–18 season 14–18, 6–12 in MAC play to finish in last place in the East Division. In the MAC tournament, they defeated Western Michigan in the first round before losing to Eastern Michigan in the quarterfinals.

== Offseason ==
=== Departures ===
Name	Number	Pos.	Height	Weight	Year	Hometown	Reason for departure
Malcon Duvivier	4	G	6'2"	210	RS senior	Toronto, ON	Graduated
Craig Eurbanks	5	G	6'4"	200	Senior	Cleveland, OH	Walk-on; graduated
Virshon Cotton	11	G	6'1"	165	Freshman	Milwaukee, WI	Transferred to LIU Brooklyn
Sina Gbadebo	14	G	6'1"	190	Freshman	Windsor, ON	Walk-on; left the team for personal reasons
Eric Parrish	20	G	6'6"	195	Freshman	Cypress, TX	Transferred to Bossier Parish CC
Torrey Patton	24	G	6'4"	195	Freshman	Trotwood, OH	Transferred to Indian Hills CC

=== Incoming transfers ===
Name	Number	Pos.	Height	Weight	Year	Hometown	Previous school
Tyler Cheese	4	G	6'4"	190	Junior	Albany, GA	Junior college transferred to Florida SouthWestern State College
LePear Toles	5	G	6'6"		Sophomore	Canton, OH	Junior college transferred from State Fair Community College
Channel Banks	11	G	6'4"	185	Sophomore	Las Vegas, NV	Junior college transferred from Sheridan College
Jeremy Roscoe	13	G	6'3"		RS sophomore	Chicago, IL	Junior college transferred from Chipola College
Xeryius Williams	20	F	6'9"	205	Senior	Huber Heights, OH	Transferred from Dayton. Under NCAA transfer rules, Williams will have to sit out for the 2018–19 season. Will have one year of remaining eligibility.
Khadim Gueye	50	F	7'0"	248	Junior	Dakar, Senegal	Transferred from South Carolina. Under NCAA transfer rules, Gueye will have to sit out for the 2018–19 season. Will have two years of remaining eligibility.

=== Recruiting class of 2018 ===
There was no recruiting class for Akron in 2018.

=== Recruiting class of 2019 ===
College recruiting (2019)
Name	Hometown	School	Height	Weight	Commit date
Mikal Dawson; SG	Huntington, WV	Huntington Prep School	6 ft 4 in (1.93 m)	200 lb (91 kg)	Aug 26, 2018
Mikal Dawson; SG	Recruit ratings: Scout: Rivals: (NR)				
Ali Ali; SF	Kendallville, IN	East Noble High School	6 ft 7 in (2.01 m)	185 lb (84 kg)	Aug 29, 2018
Ali Ali; SF	Recruit ratings: Scout: Rivals: (NR)				
Camron Reece; PF	Oakland, CA	Sheridan College	6 ft 6 in (1.98 m)	220 lb (100 kg)	Sep 30, 2018
Camron Reece; PF	Recruit ratings: Scout: Rivals: (NR)				
Overall recruit ranking:
Note: In many cases, Scout, Rivals, 247Sports, On3, and ESPN may conflict in their listings of height and weight.; In these cases, the average was taken. ESPN grades are on a 100-point scale.; Sources: "2019 Team Ranking". Rivals.

== Roster ==
2018–19 Akron Zips men's basketball team
Players
Coaches

Pos.	#	Name	Height	Weight	Year	Previous school	Hometown
G	0	Jimond Ivey	6 ft 5 in (1.96 m)	200 lb (91 kg)	Sr	Glenville	Cleveland, OH
G	1	Loren Cristian Jackson	5 ft 8 in (1.73 m)	160 lb (73 kg)	RS So	Victory Rock Prep; Long Beach State	Chicago, IL
F	3	Daniel Utomi	6 ft 6 in (1.98 m)	215 lb (98 kg)	Jr	Westside	Houston, TX
G	4	Tyler Cheese	6 ft 5 in (1.96 m)	195 lb (88 kg)	Jr	Albany; Florida Southwestern State	Albany, GA
G	5	LePear Toles	6 ft 6 in (1.98 m)	195 lb (88 kg)	So	Canton McKinley; State Fair CC	Canton, OH
C	10	Deng Riak	6 ft 10 in (2.08 m)	225 lb (102 kg)	RS Jr	Victory Rock Prep; East Carolina	Melbourne, Australia
G	11	Channel Banks	6 ft 4 in (1.93 m)	186 lb (84 kg)	Jr	Hillcrest Prep; Sheridan College	Las Vegas, NV
G	12	Marquelle Mcintyre (W)	5 ft 10 in (1.78 m)	175 lb (79 kg)	Jr	Greensboro Day School	Greensboro, NC
G	13	Jeremy Roscoe	6 ft 2 in (1.88 m)	190 lb (86 kg)	Jr	Uplift; Panola College	Chicago, IL
G	14	Scott Walter (W)	5 ft 10 in (1.78 m)	170 lb (77 kg)	Fr	St. Vincent-St. Mary	Akron, OH
F	20	Xeyrius Williams (redshirt)	6 ft 9 in (2.06 m)	205 lb (93 kg)	Sr	Wayne; Dayton	Huber Heights, OH
F	22	Emmanuel Plojakpoke	6 ft 8 in (2.03 m)	190 lb (86 kg)	Jr	Cypress Springs	Houston, TX
F	23	Jaden Sayles	6 ft 9 in (2.06 m)	235 lb (107 kg)	So	Sycamore	Cincinnati, OH
G	24	Jake Fischer (W)	6 ft 4 in (1.93 m)	180 lb (82 kg)	Fr	Bishop Harley	Columbus, OH
G	25	Lucas Smith (W)	6 ft 5 in (1.96 m)	195 lb (88 kg)	Sr	Bellevue East; Iowa Lakes CC	Omaha, NE
C	44	Mark Kostelac	6 ft 11 in (2.11 m)	250 lb (113 kg)	So	Notre Dame Cathedral Latin	Cleveland, OH
F	50	Khadim Gueye (redshirt)	7 ft 0 in (2.13 m)	245 lb (111 kg)	Jr	Victory Rock Prep; South Carolina	Dakar, Senegal

Head coach

- John Groce (Taylor)

Assistant coach(es)

- Dustin Ford (Ohio)
- Rob Fulford (Marshall)
- Robby Pridgen (Roanoke)

Legend

- (C) Team captain
- (S) Suspended
- (I) Ineligible
- (W) Walk-on
- Injured
- Current redshirt

Roster

== Schedule and results ==
Date time, TV	Rank^{#}	Opponent^{#}	Result	Record	Site (attendance) city, state
Non-conference regular season
Nov 6, 2018*; 7:00 pm, ESPN3		Cedarville	W 70–50	1–0	James A. Rhodes Arena (2,261); Akron, OH
Nov 10, 2018*; 4:30 pm, ESPN3		vs. Youngstown State; Northeast Ohio Coaches vs. Cancer	W 98–69	2–0	Quicken Loans Arena; Cleveland, OH
Nov 16, 2018*; 7:00 pm, ESPN3		Chicago State; Cayman Islands Classic on-campus game	W 87–46	3–0	James A. Rhodes Arena (2,285); Akron, OH
Nov 19, 2018*; 11:00 am, Stadium		vs. No. 16 Clemson; Cayman Islands Classic Quarterfinals	L 69–72	3–1	John Gray Gymnasium (1,050); George Town, Cayman Islands
Nov 20, 2018*; 12:00 pm, Stadium		vs. Illinois State; Cayman Islands Classic consolation semi finals	L 68–73	3–2	John Gray Gymnasium (667); George Town, Cayman Islands
Nov 21, 2018*; 10:00 am, Stadium		vs. St. Bonaventure; Cayman Islands Classic 7th place game	W 61–49	4–2	John Gray Gymnasium (566); George Town, Cayman Islands
Nov 28, 2018*; 7:00 pm, ESPN+		Alabama State	W 86–54	5–2	James A. Rhodes Arena (2,294); Akron, OH
Dec 1, 2018*; 5:00 pm, ESPN3		Detroit Mercy	W 71–59	6–2	James A. Rhodes Arena (2,364); Akron, OH
Dec 5, 2018*; 7:00 pm		at Purdue Fort Wayne	L 65–68	6–3	Memorial Coliseum (1,274); Fort Wayne, IN
Dec 15, 2018*; 2:00 pm, ESPN+		Marshall	L 74–75	6–4	James A. Rhodes Arena (2,748); Akron, OH
Dec 18, 2018*; 7:00 pm, ESPN+		Tennessee State	W 82–60	7–4	James A. Rhodes Arena (2,151); Akron, OH
Dec 22, 2018*; 4:00 pm, ESPN3		at No. 6 Nevada	L 62–68	7–5	Lawlor Events Center (10,825); Reno, NV
Dec 30, 2018*; 2:00 pm, ESPN3		Carnegie Mellon	W 82–55	8–5	James A. Rhodes Arena (2,446); Akron, OH
MAC regular season
Jan 5, 2019; 2:00 pm, ESPN3		Western Michigan	W 56–48	9–5 (1–0)	James A. Rhodes Arena (2,276); Akron, OH
Jan 8, 2019; 7:00 pm, ESPN+		at Central Michigan	L 86–88 ^{OT}	9–6 (1–1)	McGuirk Arena (2,126); Mount Pleasant, MI
Jan 12, 2019; 3:30 pm, ESPN+		at Northern Illinois	L 56–73	9–7 (1–2)	Convocation Center (906); DeKalb, IL
Jan 15, 2019; 7:00 pm, ESPN+		Eastern Michigan	W 51–49	10–7 (2–2)	James A. Rhodes Arena (2,334); Akron, OH
Jan 19, 2019; 3:30 pm, ESPN3		at Miami (OH)	L 61–68	10–8 (2–3)	Millett Hall (1,202); Oxford, OH
Jan 22, 2019; 7:00 pm, ESPN+		Central Michigan	W 70–67	11–8 (3–3)	James A. Rhodes Arena (2,254); Akron, OH
Jan 26, 2019; 5:00 pm, ESPN+		Northern Illinois	W 67–65	12–8 (4–3)	James A. Rhodes Arena (2,996); Akron, OH
Feb 2, 2019; 3:30 pm, ESPN3		at Ohio	W 65–53	13–8 (5–3)	Convocation Center (7,887); Athens, OH
Feb 5, 2019; 7:00 pm, ESPN+		at Toledo	L 52–63	13–9 (5–4)	Savage Arena (3,895); Toledo, OH
Feb 8, 2019; 9:00 pm, ESPNU		Kent State	W 72–53	14–9 (6–4)	James A. Rhodes Arena (4,289); Akron, OH
Feb 12, 2019; 7:00 pm, ESPN+		No. 25 Buffalo	L 70–76	14–10 (6–5)	James A. Rhodes Arena (2,646); Akron, OH
Feb 16, 2019; 2:00 p.m., ESPN3		at Ball State	L 56–57	14–11 (6–6)	Worthen Arena (4,577); Muncie, IN
Feb 19, 2019; 7:00 pm, ESPN+		at Bowling Green	L 69–73	14–12 (6–7)	Stroh Center (1,954); Bowling Green, OH
Feb 23, 2019; 2:00 pm, ESPN+		Miami (OH)	W 70–58	15–12 (7–7)	James A. Rhodes Arena (3,026); Akron, OH
Feb 26, 2019; 7:00 pm, ESPN+		at No. 21 Buffalo	L 64–77	15–13 (7–8)	Alumni Arena (5,789); Amherst, NY
Mar 2, 2019; 2:00 pm, ESPN+		Ohio	L 49–73	15–14 (7–9)	James A. Rhodes Arena (2,714); Akron, OH
Mar 5, 2019; 7:00 pm, ESPN+		Bowling Green	W 91–67	16–14 (8–9)	James A. Rhodes Arena (2,902); Akron, OH
Mar 8, 2019; 6:30 pm, ESPN+		at Kent State	L 65-68	16–15 (8–10)	MAC Center (6,168); Kent, OH
MAC tournament
Mar 11, 2019; 8:00 pm, ESPN+	(8)	(9) Miami (OH); First round	W 80–51	17–15	James A. Rhodes Arena (2,376); Akron, OH
Mar 14, 2019; 12:00 pm, ESPN+	(8)	vs. (1) No. 18 Buffalo; Quarterfinals	L 46–82	17–16	Quicken Loans Arena (2,499); Cleveland, OH
*Non-conference game. ^{#}Rankings from AP Poll. (#) Tournament seedings in parentheses. All times are in Eastern Time.
