= 2018–19 Miami RedHawks men's basketball team =

American college basketball season

2018–19 Miami RedHawks men's basketball
- Conference: Mid-American Conference
- East Division
- Record: 15–17 (7–11 MAC)
- Head coach: Jack Owens (2nd season)
- Assistant coaches: Jeff Rutter; J.R. Reynolds; Kenneth Lowe
- Home arena: Millett Hall

2018–19 Mid-American Conference men's basketball standings
	Conf.				Overall
Team	W		L	PCT	W		L	PCT
East
No. 15 Buffalo †	16	–	2	.889	32	–	4	.889
Bowling Green	12	–	6	.667	22	–	12	.647
Kent State	11	–	7	.611	22	–	11	.667
Akron	8	–	10	.444	17	–	16	.515
Miami (OH)	7	–	11	.389	15	–	17	.469
Ohio	6	–	12	.333	14	–	17	.452
West
Toledo	13	–	5	.722	25	–	8	.758
Central Michigan	10	–	8	.556	23	–	12	.657
Eastern Michigan	9	–	9	.500	15	–	17	.469
Northern Illinois	8	–	10	.444	17	–	17	.500
Ball State	6	–	12	.333	16	–	17	.485
Western Michigan	2	–	16	.111	8	–	24	.250
† 2019 MAC tournament winner Rankings from AP Poll

The 2018–19 Miami RedHawks men's basketball team represented Miami University during the 2018–19 NCAA Division I men's basketball season. The RedHawks, led by second-year head coach Jack Owens, played their home games at Millett Hall, as members of the East Division of the Mid-American Conference. They finished the season 15–17 overall, 7–11 in MAC play to finish in fifth place in the East Division. As the No. 9 seed in the MAC tournament, they were defeated in the first round by Akron.

== Previous season ==
The RedHawks finished with a record of 16-18, 8-10 in MAC play for the 2017–18 season which netted them a third place finish. They lost to Western Michigan as a No. 12 seed in the MAC tournament. In the first round of the MAC tournament they advanced by defeating Ohio after which in the quarterfinals they lost to Toledo. They were invited to the College Basketball Invitational where they lost in the first round to Campbell.

== Roster ==
2018–19 Miami RedHawks men's basketball team
Players
Coaches

Pos.	#	Name	Height	Weight	Year	Previous school	Hometown
F	21	Aleks Abrams	6 ft 8 in (2.03 m)	250 lb (113 kg)	RS Sr	Oaks Christian	Newbury Park, CA
G	3	Jalen Adaway	6 ft 5 in (1.96 m)	201 lb (91 kg)	So	Logansport HS	Logansport, IN
F	5	Precious Ayah	6 ft 6 in (1.98 m)	225 lb (102 kg)	RS So	Greenforest (GA)	Bayelsia State, Nigeria
F	14	Bam Bowman	6 ft 8 in (2.03 m)	267 lb (121 kg)	Jr	Warren Central/Shawnee	Bowling Green, KY
F	13	Dalonte Brown	6 ft 7 in (2.01 m)	201 lb (91 kg)	So	Bowsher	Toledo, OH
G	4	Isaiah Coleman-Lands	6 ft 0 in (1.83 m)	161 lb (73 kg)	So	La Lumiere School	Indianapolis, IN
G	30	Abdoulaye Harouna	6 ft 5 in (1.96 m)	180 lb (82 kg)	RS Sr	South Kent, CT/Southern Idaho	Niamey, Niger
G	15	Milos Jovic	6 ft 4 in (1.93 m)	195 lb (88 kg)	So	GB Academy (Czech Republic)	Leskovac, Serbia
G	2	Mekhi Lairy	5 ft 8 in (1.73 m)	140 lb (64 kg)	Fr	Evansville Bosse	Evansville, IN
G	3	Benjamin Litteken	6 ft 0 in (1.83 m)	185 lb (84 kg)	So	Clayton	St. Louis, MO
F	22	Elijah McNamara	6 ft 9 in (2.06 m)	200 lb (91 kg)	Fr	Pickerington North	Pickerington, IN
G	12	Darrian Ringo	6 ft 2 in (1.88 m)	173 lb (78 kg)	Sr	Brownsburg HS	Brownsburg, IN
G	21	Michael Ritchie	6 ft 5 in (1.96 m)	194 lb (88 kg)	So	Mt. Prospect HS	Mt. Prospect, IL
G	1	Nike Sibande	6 ft 4 in (1.93 m)	185 lb (84 kg)	So	Crispus Attucks	Indianapolis, IN
G	11	Myja White	6 ft 1 in (1.85 m)	184 lb (83 kg)	Fr	Brebeuf Jesuit	Terre Haute, IN

Head coach

- Jack Owens (Eastern Illinois)

Assistant coach(es)

- Jeff Rutter (Winona State)
- J.R. Reynolds (Eastern Illinois)
- Kenneth Lowe (Purdue)

Legend

- (C) Team captain
- (S) Suspended
- (I) Ineligible
- (W) Walk-on
- Injured
- Current redshirt

Roster
Last update: November 3, 2018

== Schedule and results ==
The 2018-19 non-conference schedule was released on July 20, 2018. The MAC conference schedule was announced on August 1, 2018. The RedHawks will participate in the Islands of Bahamas Showcase in Nassau, Bahamas.

Date time, TV	Rank^{#}	Opponent^{#}	Result	Record	Site (attendance) city, state
Exhibition
Nov 5, 2018*; 7:00 p.m.		Taylor	W 84–53		Millett Hall; Oxford, OH
Non-conference regular season
Nov 10, 2018*; 7:00 p.m., FSN		at Butler	L 68–90	0–1	Hinkle Fieldhouse (9,171); Indianapolis, IN
Nov 12, 2018*; 7:00 p.m., ESPN3		Midway	W 91–42	1–1	Millett Hall (945); Oxford, OH
Nov 16, 2018*; 2:00 p.m., BD Global		vs. North Dakota State; Islands of the Bahamas Showcase	W 89–78	2–1	Kendal Isaacs National Gymnasium (325); Nassau, Bahamas
Nov 17, 2018*; 5:00 p.m.		vs. Montana; Islands of the Bahamas Showcase semifinals	L 71–73	2–2	Kendal Isaacs National Gymnasium (543); Nassau, Bahamas
Nov 18, 2018*; 5:00 p.m.		vs. Pepperdine; Islands of the Bahamas Showcase 3rd place game	L 80–86	2–3	Kendal Isaacs National Gymnasium (427); Nassau, Bahamas
Nov 24, 2018*; 2:00 p.m., ESPN+		Army	W 85–55	3–3	Millett Hall (1,307); Oxford, OH
Nov 28, 2018*; 6:30 p.m., FS1		at Xavier	L 55–82	3–4	Cintas Center (10,394); Cincinnati, OH
Dec 1, 2018*; 2:00 p.m., ESPN3		Wilberforce	W 88–57	4–4	Millett Hall (1,170); Oxford, OH
Dec 5, 2018*; 7:00 p.m., ESPN3		at Wright State	W 65–62	5–4	Nutter Center (4,095); Fairborn, OH
Dec 8, 2018*; 2:00 p.m., ESPN+		Purdue Fort Wayne	W 85–79	6–4	Millett Hall (1,451); Oxford, OH
Dec 16, 2018*; 7:00 p.m., ESPN3		at Northern Kentucky	L 66–72	6–5	BB&T Arena (3,100); Highland Heights, KY
Dec 20, 2018*; 7:00 p.m., ESPN+		South Carolina State	W 79–55	7–5	Millett Hall; Oxford, OH
Dec 30, 2018*; 1:00 p.m., ESPN+		Evansville	W 70–67	8–5	Millett Hall (1,456); Oxford, OH
MAC regular season
Jan 5, 2019; 2:00 p.m., ESPN3		Central Michigan	L 77–84	8–6 (0–1)	Millett Hall (1,578); Oxford, OH
Jan 8, 2019; 7:00 p.m., ESPN+		Northern Illinois	L 70–83	8–7 (0–2)	Millett Hall (1,611); Oxford, OH
Jan 12, 2019; 12:00 p.m., CBSSN		at No. 19 Buffalo	L 64–88	8–8 (0–3)	Alumni Arena (6,177); Buffalo, NY
Jan 15, 2019; 7:00 p.m., ESPN3		at Toledo	L 59–71	8–9 (0–4)	Savage Arena (4,386); Toledo, OH
Jan 19, 2019; 3:30 p.m., ESPN3		Akron	W 68–61	9–9 (1–4)	Millett Hall (1,202); Oxford, OH
Jan 22, 2019; 7:00 p.m., ESPN+		at Ball State	W 71–65	10–9 (2–4)	Worthen Arena (3,742); Muncie, IN
Jan 26, 2019; 3:30 p.m., ESPN3		Bowling Green	W 67–53	11–9 (3–4)	Millett Hall (2,257); Oxford, OH
Jan 29, 2019; 7:00 p.m., ESPN+		Toledo	L 63–66	11–10 (3–5)	Millett Hall (1,677); Oxford, OH
Feb 2, 2019; 12:00 p.m., ESPN+		at Eastern Michigan	W 59–48	12–10 (4–5)	Convocation Center; Ypsilanti, MI
Feb 5, 2019; 7:00 p.m., ESPN+		at Kent State	L 67-70	12–11 (4–6)	Memorial Athletic and Convocation Center (2,236); Kent, OH
Feb 9, 2019; 2:00 p.m., ESPN+		Ohio	W 79-59	13-11 (5-6)	Millett Hall (2,319); Oxford, OH
Feb 16, 2019; 2:00 p.m., ESPN3		at Western Michigan	L 79-84 ^{OT}	13-12 (5-7)	University Arena (2,127); Kalamazoo, MI
Feb 19, 2019; 7:00 p.m., ESPN+		Ball State	W 69-66	14-12 (6-7)	Millett Hall (1,871); Oxford, OH
Feb 23, 2019; 2:00 p.m., ESPN+		at Akron	L 58-70	14-13 (6-8)	James A. Rhodes Arena (3,026); Akron, OH
Feb 26, 2019; 7:00 p.m., ESPN+		at Bowling Green	W 82-69	15-13 (7-8)	Stroh Center (2,225); Bowling Green
Mar 2, 2019; 2:00 p.m., CBSSN		No. 21 Buffalo	L 69-77	15-14 (7-9)	Millett Hall (3,026); Oxford, OH
Mar 5, 2019; 7:00 p.m., ESPN+		Kent State	L 66-75	15-15 (7-10)	Millett Hall (2,343); Oxford, OH
Mar 8, 2019; 7:00 p.m., ESPN+		at Ohio	L 57-66	15-16 (7-11)	Convocation Center; Athens, OH
MAC tournament
Mar 1, 2019; 8:00 p.m., ESPN+		at Akron	L 51–80	15–17	James A. Rhodes Arena (2,376); Akron, OH
*Non-conference game. ^{#}Rankings from AP Poll. (#) Tournament seedings in parentheses. All times are in Eastern Time.

== See also ==
- 2018–19 Miami RedHawks women's basketball team
