= Obion County Central High School =

Location
- 528 Highway 51 North; Troy, Tennessee 38260; United States; 36.3429°N 89.1563°W

Information
- School type: Public, high school
- School district: Obion County Schools
- Superintendent: Tim Watkins
- NCES School ID: 470327001406
- Principal: Chris Lownsdale
- Faculty: 52.00 (FTE)
- Grades: 9–12
- Enrollment: 652 (2024-2025)
- Colors: Red; White; Blue
- Athletics conference: TSSAA
- Nickname: Rebels
- Website: Official site

Obion County Central High School is a public high school in Troy, Tennessee, United States. It is part of the Obion County Schools system. As of 2024–2025, it has an enrollment of approximately 652 students. The current principal is Chris Lownsdale.

In 2025, the school was ranked as a level 5 school by the Tennessee Department of Education for its student success and college-readiness for the 2023-2024 school year.

== Athletics ==
Obion County Central plays in the TSSAA's west grand division and 8th athletic district as the Rebels and Lady Rebels. OCCHS competes in baseball, basketball, cross country, football, golf, soccer, softball, tennis, track and field, and volleyball.

The Rebels hold the following titles:

OCCHS has also made numerous state tournament appearances for football and boys' cross country. The co-ed cheerleading also won the Deep South Beach Nationals Coed Non-Tumble Championship.

Team State Titles
Year	Sport	Class	Award	Details
1922	Girls' Basketball		Runner-Up	
1986	Boys' Basketball	AA	Champions	(34-5)
1985	Girls' Basketball	AA	Runner-Up	(28-6)
2012	Girls' Basketball	AA	Runner-Up	(35-3)

Individual State Titles
Year	Sport	Class	Award	Details / Name
2000	Girls' Cross Country	A-AA	Runner-Up	Jill Konkil
2002	Girls' Cross Country	A-AA	Runner-Up	Jill Konkil

== Controversy ==
In 2015, the students and community reacted against the director of schools' decision in removing the confederate flag from the school's signage. Multiple individuals, including a member of the Obion County School Board, labelled it an act of history erasure.

In 2022, the treasurer for the school's baseball booster club was indicted for financial fraud and theft of the club's funds. This followed an active investigation made by the Tennessee Comptroller's Office, responsible for public funds.
