= Eugene German =

American basketball player

No. 1 – Hapoel Tel Aviv
- Position: Point guard
- League: Israeli Basketball Premier League; EuroLeague

Personal information
- Born: December 2, 1997 (age 28) Gary, Indiana, U.S.
- Listed height: 6 ft 0 in (1.83 m)
- Listed weight: 185 lb (84 kg)

Career information
- High school: 21st Century (Gary, Indiana)
- College: Northern Illinois (2016–2020)
- NBA draft: 2020: undrafted
- Playing career: 2021–present

Career history
- 2021–2022: Ionikos Nikaias
- 2022: Merkezefendi
- 2022–2023: Qingdao Eagles
- 2023–2024: Fujian Sturgeons
- 2024: Merkezefendi
- 2024–2026: Beijing Ducks
- 2026: Indios de Mayagüez
- 2026–present: Hapoel Tel Aviv

Career highlights
- First-team All-MAC (2020); 2× Second-team All-MAC (2018, 2019); MAC All-Freshman Team (2017)

Eugene Anthony German (born December 2, 1997) is an American professional basketball player for the Hapoel Tel Aviv of the Israeli Basketball Premier League and the EuroLeague. He played college basketball for the Northern Illinois Huskies, and left as the program's all-time leading scorer and a conference champion.

== High school career ==
German grew up in Gary, Indiana, and played basketball from an early age under his father's guidance. At age 10, he was noticed by an Amateur Athletic Union coach at a church camp tournament and began playing around the state and country. German started high school at Andrean High School in Merrillville, Indiana, but moved to Theodore Roosevelt High School in Gary, Indiana before playing a basketball game for Andrean. He did not play for Roosevelt either due to a left hip fracture.

For his sophomore season, German transferred to 21st Century Charter School in Gary, averaging 17.4 points per game. As a junior, he averaged a state-high 32 points, six rebounds, three assists, and three steals per game, and was named to the Small School All-State team. After the season, he committed to play college basketball for Northern Illinois.

As a senior, German averaged 33.5 points, 5.6 rebounds, and four assists per game, helping 21st Century win a regional title. He had nine 40-point games, and scored 51 points in a loss to national powerhouse La Lumiere School. He led the state of Indiana in scoring for a second straight year, becoming the first player to do so since Deshaun Thomas in 2009 and 2010. German earned Post-Tribune Player of the Year and Small School All-State honors. German finished his high school career as 21st Century's all-time leading scorer with 2,020 points.

== College career ==
On February 18, 2017, German scored a freshman season-high 27 points in an 88–80 overtime loss to Toledo. As a freshman, he averaged nine points, 1.4 rebounds, and 0.9 assists per game while shooting 47.2% from the floor, and was named to the Mid-American Conference (MAC) All-Freshman Team.

German gained about 15 pounds after his freshman season and had breakout success as a sophomore. On February 17, 2018, he scored a season-high 31 points in a 75–67 win over Western Michigan. In his sophomore season, German led the MAC with 20.6 points per game, while averaging 3.8 rebounds and 1.7 assists per game, while shooting 47.1% from the floor (5th in the conference), and was named to the second team All-MAC.

On November 28, as a junior, he recorded a career-high 33 points and five rebounds in an 85–83 loss to Green Bay. German averaged 20.4 points (2nd in the conference), 5.2 rebounds, 2.9 assists, and 1.2 steals per game, while shooting 49.0% from the floor (6th) and 41.4% from three-point range, to earn second-team All-MAC honors. He was also named to the MAC All-Tournament Team after averaging 27 points per game at the 2019 MAC tournament.

Against Miami (Ohio) on February 1, 2020, as a senior, German passed T. J. Lux as Northern Illinois' all-time leading scorer and became the first player in program history to score 2,000 career points. In his senior season, he averaged a MAC-leading 20.5 points, 4.1 rebounds, 2.7 assists, and 1.0 steals per game. German was named to the Lou Henson All-America Team by Collegeinsider.com and to the first team All-MAC. He finished his career at Northern Illinois with 2,203 points, which ranked fifth in MAC history.

== Professional career ==
On August 9, 2021, German signed with Greek club Ionikos Nikaias. In 2021-22 he averaged 20 points, 2.8 rebounds, and 2.3 assists per game.

On February 10, 2022, German signed with Merkezefendi Belediyesi Denizli Basket of the Basketbol Süper Ligi. In 2022 he played 10 games for the team, and averaged 34.7 minutes, 23.8 points, 3.1 rebounds, and 2.9 assists per game, while shooting 53.0% from the floor and 43.7% from three-point range.

On May 25, 2022, German signed with Qingdao Eagles of the Chinese Basketball Association. In 2022-23 he played 41 games for the team, and averaged 22.1 minutes, 24.2 points, 5.3 rebounds, 3.7 assists, and 1.1 steals per game.

In 2023–24, he played 47 games for the Fujian Sturgeons of the Chinese Basketball Association, and averaged 25.1 minutes, 22.4 points, 4.9 rebounds, 5.1 assists, and 1.2 steals per game, while shooting 47.2% from the field and 82.1% from the free throw line.

On April 4, 2024, he signed with Yukatel Merkezefendi of the Basketbol Süper Ligi (BSL) for a second stint, in which he played three games and averaged 18.0 points per game.

On October 2, 2024, German signed with Beijing Ducks of the Chinese Basketball Association (CBA). In 2024-25 he played 59 games for the team, and averaged 29.8 minutes, 18.2 points, 4.4 rebounds, 7.1 assists, and 1.2 steals per game, shooting 47.0% from the field.

In 2025-26 for the Ducks he played 48 games for the team, and averaged 27.1 minutes, 18.3 points, 3.2 rebounds, 4.8 assists, and 1.0 steals per game, shooting 46.2% from the field and 83.9% from the free throw line.

That season he played 8 games for Indios de Mayaguez in Puerto Rico, and averaged 32.7 minutes, 17.4 points, 3.5 rebounds, and 4.5 assists per game, shooting 87.5% from the free throw line.

On July 22, 2026, German made his debut on the streetball TNC league at the Summit 03 event. He defeated YouTube personality Moon at the event with a score of 30–15.

On August 1, 2026, German signed a one-year deal with Hapoel Tel Aviv of the Israeli Basketball Premier League.

== Personal life ==
German's father, David German Sr., played basketball for Horace Mann School in the 1980s. His mother, Eugenia, ran track for Mann. German's sister, Princess, played college basketball for Milwaukee and Indianapolis. His brother, David Jr., played basketball for 21st Century Charter School.
