= 2018–19 Youngstown State Penguins men's basketball team =

American college basketball season

2018–19 Youngstown State Penguins men's basketball
- Conference: Horizon League
- Record: 12–20 (8–10 Horizon)
- Head coach: Jerrod Calhoun (2nd season)
- Assistant coaches: Paul Molinari; Jason Slay; Brady Trenkle
- Home arena: Beeghly Center

2018–19 Horizon League men's basketball standings
	Conf.				Overall
Team	W		L	PCT	W		L	PCT
Wright State	13	–	5	.722	21	–	14	.600
Northern Kentucky †	13	–	5	.722	26	–	9	.743
Oakland	11	–	7	.611	16	–	17	.485
Green Bay	10	–	8	.556	21	–	17	.553
UIC	10	–	8	.556	16	–	16	.500
Youngstown State	8	–	10	.444	12	–	20	.375
Detroit Mercy	8	–	10	.444	11	–	20	.355
IUPUI	8	–	10	.444	16	–	17	.485
Cleveland State	5	–	13	.278	10	–	21	.323
Milwaukee	4	–	14	.222	9	–	22	.290
† 2019 Horizon League tournament winner

The 2018–19 Youngstown State Penguins men's basketball team represented Youngstown State University during the 2018–19 NCAA Division I men's basketball season. The Penguins, led by second-year head coach Jerrod Calhoun, played their home games at the Beeghly Center in Youngstown, Ohio as members of the Horizon League. They finished the season 12–20, 8–10 in Horizon League play, to finish in a three-way tie for sixth place. They lost in the quarterfinals of the Horizon League tournament to Oakland.

== Previous season ==
The Penguins finished the 2017–18 season 8–24, 6–12 in Horizon League play, to finish in a tie for eighth place. They lost in the first round of the Horizon League tournament to Cleveland State.

== Roster ==
2018–19 Youngstown State Penguins men's basketball team
Players
Coaches

Pos.	#	Name	Height	Weight	Year	Hometown
F	0	Antwan Jr. Maxwell	6 ft 7 in (2.01 m)	220 lb (100 kg)	Jr	Savannah, GA
G	1	Atiba Taylor	6 ft 4 in (1.93 m)	178 lb (81 kg)	Fr	Hackensack, NJ
G	2	Jalani Simmons	6 ft 5 in (1.96 m)	190 lb (86 kg)	Fr	Columbus, OH
G	3	Darius Quisenberry	6 ft 1 in (1.85 m)	186 lb (84 kg)	Fr	Springfield, OH
G	4	Cameron Kane-Johnson	5 ft 11 in (1.8 m)	220 lb (100 kg)	Jr	Niles, Ohio
G	5	Kendale Hampton	6 ft 3 in (1.91 m)	200 lb (91 kg)	Jr	Columbia, SC
G	13	Donel Cathcart	6 ft 5 in (1.96 m)	190 lb (86 kg)	Jr	Buffalo, NY
G	20	Geoff Hamperian (W)	6 ft 4 in (1.93 m)	200 lb (91 kg)	RS Fr	Morgantown, WV
F	21	Noe Anabir	6 ft 8 in (2.03 m)	229 lb (104 kg)	Sr	Geneva, Switzerland
G	22	Devin Morgan	5 ft 10 in (1.78 m)	212 lb (96 kg)	RS Jr	Chester, VA
F	23	Olamide Pedersen	6 ft 9 in (2.06 m)	209 lb (95 kg)	RS Fr	Brønshøj, Denmark
F	31	Michael Akuchie	6 ft 8 in (2.03 m)	212 lb (96 kg)	So	Plantation, FL
G	32	Garrett Covington	6 ft 6 in (1.98 m)	230 lb (104 kg)	So	Carmel, IN
F	33	Naz Bohannon	6 ft 6 in (1.98 m)	230 lb (104 kg)	So	Lorain, OH
G	34	Justin Bofenkamp (W)	6 ft 0 in (1.83 m)	184 lb (83 kg)	RS Fr	Vienna, OH
F	42	Alex Holcombe	6 ft 9 in (2.06 m)	244 lb (111 kg)	RS Jr	Houston, TX
C	50	John Jr. Sally (W)	6 ft 11 in (2.11 m)	250 lb (113 kg)	RS Fr	Disputanta, VA

Head coach

- Jerrod Calhoun (Cincinnati)

Assistant coach(es)

- Paul Molinari (Villanova)
- Jason Slay (West Virginia State)
- Brady Trenkle (San Diego State)

Legend

- (C) Team captain
- (S) Suspended
- (I) Ineligible
- (W) Walk-on
- Injured
- Current redshirt

Roster
Last update: September 19, 2025

== Schedule and results ==
Date time, TV	Rank^{#}	Opponent^{#}	Result	Record	Site (attendance) city, state
Non-conference regular season
November 6, 2018*; 7:00 p.m., ACCN Extra		at Pittsburgh	L 53–69	0–1	Petersen Events Center (4,729); Pittsburgh, PA
November 10, 2018*; 7:00 p.m., ESPN3		vs. Akron; Northeast Ohio Coaches vs Cancer Doubleheader	L 69–98	0–2	Wolstein Center (2,052); Cleveland, OH
November 12, 2018*; 7:00 p.m., ESPN+		Heidelberg	W 106–83	1–2	Beeghly Center (1,538); Youngstown, OH
November 16, 2018*; 8:30 p.m.		vs. Columbia; John Bach Classic	W 94–83	2–2	Rose Hill Gymnasium (1,765); The Bronx, NY
November 17, 2018*; 3:30 p.m., ESPN+		at Fordham; John Bach Classic	L 61–67	2–3	Rose Hill Gymnasium (1,809); The Bronx, NY
November 18, 2018*; 12:00 p.m.		vs. FIU; John Bach Classic	L 93–102	2–4	Rose Hill Gymnasium (123); The Bronx, NY
November 21, 2018*; 7:00 p.m., ESPN3		Westminster (PA); John Bach Classic	W 104–66	3–4	Beeghly Center (1,838); Youngstown, OH
November 28, 2018*; 7:00 p.m., ESPN+		at Robert Morris	L 56–76	3–5	North Athletic Complex (1,016); Pittsburgh, PA
December 1, 2018*; 4:00 p.m., ATTSNPT		at West Virginia	L 72–106	3–6	WVU Coliseum (10,849); Morgantown, WV
December 4, 2018*; 7:00 p.m., ESPN+		Central Michigan	L 94–100 ^{3OT}	3–7	Beeghly Center (1,370); Youngstown, OH
December 8, 2018*; 2:00 p.m., ESPN3		Western Michigan	L 77–88	3–8	Beeghly Center (3,449); Youngstown, OH
December 15, 2018*; 2:00 p.m.		at Binghamton	W 58–48	4–8	Binghamton University Events Center (1,527); Vestal, NY
December 18, 2018*; 7:00 p.m., BTN		at No. 15 Ohio State	L 56–75	4–9	Value City Arena (12,637); Columbus, OH
Horizon League regular season
December 28, 2018; 2:00 p.m., ESPN+		Detroit Mercy	L 66–78	4–10 (0–1)	Beeghly Center (2,129); Youngstown, OH
December 30, 2018; 2:00 p.m., ESPN3		Oakland	L 74–76	4–11 (0–2)	Beeghly Center (2,804); Youngstown, OH
January 3, 2019; 8:00 p.m., ESPN+		at Green Bay	L 93–99 ^{OT}	4–12 (0–3)	Resch Center (2,023); Ashwaubenon, WI
January 5, 2019; 5:00 p.m., ESPN+		at Milwaukee	W 76–51	5–12 (1–3)	UW–Milwaukee Panther Arena (1,160); Milwaukee, WI
January 10, 2019; 8:00 p.m., ESPN+		at UIC	L 63–78	5–13 (1–4)	Credit Union 1 Arena (2,026); Chicago, IL
January 12, 2019; 1:00 p.m., ESPN3		at IUPUI	W 82–76	6–13 (2–4)	Indiana Farmers Coliseum (890); Indianapolis, IN
January 17, 2019; 1:00 p.m., ESPN+		Wright State	L 74–80	6–14 (2–5)	Beeghly Center (1,598); Youngstown, OH
January 19, 2019; 6:00 p.m., ESPN3		Northern Kentucky	L 74–82	6–15 (2–6)	Beeghly Center (2,950); Youngstown, OH
January 26, 2019; 7:00 p.m., ESPN+		at Cleveland State	L 62–72	6–16 (2–7)	Wolstein Center (1,103); Cleveland, OH
January 31, 2019; 7:00 p.m., ESPN3		at Oakland	W 75–74	7–16 (3–7)	Athletics Center O'rena (2,371); Auburn Hills, MI
February 2, 2019; 1:00 p.m., ESPN3		at Detroit Mercy	W 72–70	8–16 (4–7)	Calihan Hall (1,817); Detroit, MI
February 7, 2019; 7:00 p.m., ESPN3		Milwaukee	W 72–71	9–16 (5–7)	Beeghly (1,572); Youngstown, OH
February 9, 2019; 6:00 p.m., ESPN3		Green Bay	W 96–77	10–16 (6–7)	Beeghly Center (2,170); Youngstown, OH
February 14, 2019; 6:00 p.m., ESPN+		IUPUI	W 75–73	11–16 (7–7)	Beeghly Center (1,697); Youngstown, OH
February 16, 2019; 6:00 p.m., ESPN+		UIC	W 81–73	12–16 (8–7)	Beeghly Center (4,917); Youngstown, OH
February 21, 2019; 7:00 p.m., ESPN3		at Northern Kentucky	L 69–76	12–17 (8–8)	BB&T Arena (3,408); Highland Heights, KY
February 23, 2019; 3:00 p.m., ESPN3		at Wright State	L 54–82	12–18 (8–9)	Nutter Center (5,743); Fairborn, OH
March 2, 2019; 6:00 p.m., ESPN3		Cleveland State	L 80–89 ^{OT}	12–19 (8–10)	Beeghly Center (4,011); Youngstown, OH
Horizon League tournament
March 6, 2019; 7:00 p.m., ESPN+	(6)	at (3) Oakland; Quarterfinals	L 84–88	12–20	Athletics Center O'rena (3,386); Auburn Hills, MI
*Non-conference game. ^{#}Rankings from AP poll. (#) Tournament seedings in parentheses. All times are in Eastern.
