= 2019 Horizon League men's basketball tournament =

- Classification: Division I
- Season: 2018–19
- Teams: 8
- Site: Campus sites (Quarterfinals); Little Caesars Arena (Semifinals and Finals); Detroit, Michigan
- Champions: Northern Kentucky (2nd title)
- Winning coach: John Brannen (2nd title)
- MVP: Drew McDonald (Northern Kentucky)
- Television: ESPN/ESPN2, ESPNU, ESPN+

2018–19 Horizon League men's basketball standings
	Conf.				Overall
Team	W		L	PCT	W		L	PCT
Wright State	13	–	5	.722	21	–	14	.600
Northern Kentucky †	13	–	5	.722	26	–	9	.743
Oakland	11	–	7	.611	16	–	17	.485
Green Bay	10	–	8	.556	21	–	17	.553
UIC	10	–	8	.556	16	–	16	.500
Youngstown State	8	–	10	.444	12	–	20	.375
Detroit Mercy	8	–	10	.444	11	–	20	.355
IUPUI	8	–	10	.444	16	–	17	.485
Cleveland State	5	–	13	.278	10	–	21	.323
Milwaukee	4	–	14	.222	9	–	22	.290
† 2019 Horizon League tournament winner

The 2019 Horizon League men's basketball tournament (also known as Motor City Madness) was the final event of the 2018–19 men's basketball season of the Horizon League. It began on March 5, 2019, and ended on March 12; first-round games were played at the home courts of the top four teams in regular-season league play, with all remaining games at Little Caesars Arena in Detroit.

Northern Kentucky, which shared the regular-season conference title with Wright State, won the tournament and thus received the conference's automatic berth into the NCAA tournament.

== Seeds ==
The top 8 teams participated in the tournament. Teams were seeded by record within the conference, with the following tiebreaker system used to seed teams with identical conference records:

- Head-to-head record against the other team(s) involved in the tie.
- Record against the highest-placed team in the conference table not involved in the tie. If still tied, proceed down the conference standings.
  - If two or more teams are tied for a league placement, they are considered a single entry for tiebreaking purposes, with collective records against said teams considered.
- If three or more teams are involved in a tie for a given seed, the above procedure is followed until the tie is either broken, or reduced to a two-team tie. If reduced to a two-team tie, the procedure restarts, this time with only the surviving teams analyzed.
- If teams remain tied after all of the following, the team with the higher NET (Note: NCAA Evaluation Tool, a metric officially used by the NCAA in its tournament selection process.) rating at the end of the regular season, as published by the NCAA immediately after the end of the Horizon regular season, receives the higher seed.

Seed	School	Conference	Tiebreaker 1	Tiebreaker 2
1	Wright State	13–5	1–1 vs. NKU	2–0 vs. Oakland
2	Northern Kentucky	13–5	1–1 vs. Wright	1–1 vs. Oakland
3	Oakland	11–7		
4	Green Bay	10–8	2–0 vs. UIC	
5	UIC	10–8	0–2 vs. Green Bay	
6	Youngstown State	8–10	3–1 vs. UDM/IUPUI	
7	Detroit Mercy	8–10	2–2 vs. IUPUI/YSU	
8	IUPUI	8–10	1–3 vs. UDM/YSU	
DNQ	Cleveland State	5–13		
DNQ	Milwaukee	4–14		

== Schedule ==
Game	Time	Matchup	Score	Television
Quarterfinals – Tuesday, March 5
1	8:00 pm	No. 8 IUPUI at No. 1 Wright State	56–71	ESPN+
2	8:00 pm	No. 5 UIC at No. 4 Green Bay	77–82	ESPN+
Quarterfinals – Wednesday, March 6
3	7:00 pm	No. 6 Youngstown State at No. 3 Oakland	84–88	ESPN+
4	7:00 pm	No. 7 Detroit Mercy at No. 2 Northern Kentucky	88–99	ESPN+
Semifinals – Monday, March 11
5	7:00 pm	No. 4 Green Bay vs. No. 1 Wright State	54–66	ESPNU
6	9:30 pm	No.3 Oakland vs. No. 2 Northern Kentucky	63–64	ESPNU
Finals – Tuesday, March 12
7	7:00 pm	No. 2 Northern Kentucky vs. No. 1 Wright State	77–66	ESPN
All game times in Eastern Time Zone. Rankings denote tournament seed

== Bracket ==
Quarterfinals; Tuesday/Wednesday, March 5/6; ESPN+
1	Wright State	71
8	IUPUI	56
4	Green Bay	82
5	UIC	77
2	Northern Kentucky	99
7	Detroit Mercy	88
3	Oakland	88
6	Youngstown State	84

Semifinals; Monday, March 11; ESPNU
1	Wright State	66
4	Green Bay	54
2	Northern Kentucky	64
3	Oakland	63

Championship; Tuesday, March 12; ESPN
1	Wright State	66
2	Northern Kentucky	77
