= 2018–19 Green Bay Phoenix men's basketball team =

American college basketball season

2018–19 Green Bay Phoenix men's basketball

2K Sports Classic subregional champions Hugh Durham Classic champions

CIT, runner-up
- Conference: Horizon League
- Record: 21–17 (10–8 Horizon)
- Head coach: Linc Darner (4th season)
- Assistant coaches: Randall Herbst; Richard Davis; Ben Swank
- Home arena: Resch Center; Kress Events Center

2018–19 Horizon League men's basketball standings
| | Conf. | | | | Overall |
| Team | W | | L | PCT | W | | L | PCT |
|---|---|---|---|---|---|---|---|---|
| Wright State | 13 | – | 5 | .722 | 21 | – | 14 | .600 |
| Northern Kentucky † | 13 | – | 5 | .722 | 26 | – | 9 | .743 |
| Oakland | 11 | – | 7 | .611 | 16 | – | 17 | .485 |
| Green Bay | 10 | – | 8 | .556 | 21 | – | 17 | .553 |
| UIC | 10 | – | 8 | .556 | 16 | – | 16 | .500 |
| Youngstown State | 8 | – | 10 | .444 | 12 | – | 20 | .375 |
| Detroit Mercy | 8 | – | 10 | .444 | 11 | – | 20 | .355 |
| IUPUI | 8 | – | 10 | .444 | 16 | – | 17 | .485 |
| Cleveland State | 5 | – | 13 | .278 | 10 | – | 21 | .323 |
| Milwaukee | 4 | – | 14 | .222 | 9 | – | 22 | .290 |
† 2019 Horizon League tournament winner

The 2018–19 Green Bay Phoenix men's basketball team represented the University of Wisconsin–Green Bay in the 2018–19 NCAA Division I men's basketball season. The Phoenix, led by fourth-year head coach Linc Darner, played their home games at the Resch Center, with five home games at the Kress Events Center, as members of the Horizon League. They finished the season 21–17, 10–8 in Horizon League play to finish in a tie for fourth place. They defeated UIC in the quarterfinals of the Horizon League tournament before losing in the semifinals to Wright State. They were invited to the CollegeInsider.com Tournament where they defeated East Tennessee State, FIU, Cal State Bakersfield, and Texas Southern to advance to the championship game where they lost to Marshall.

== Previous season ==
The Phoenix finished the 2017–18 season 13–20, 7–11 in to finish in seventh place. They defeated Detroit in the first round of the Horizon League tournament before losing in the quarterfinals to eventual Horizon League Tournament champion Wright State.

== Roster ==
2018–19 Green Bay Phoenix men's basketball team
Players
Coaches

| Pos. | # | Name | Height | Weight | Year | Hometown |
|---|---|---|---|---|---|---|
| F | 0 | TJ Parham | 6 ft 7 in (2.01 m) | 210 lb (95 kg) | RS Jr | Chicago, Illinois |
| G | 1 | Sandy Cohen III | 6 ft 6 in (1.98 m) | 200 lb (91 kg) | RS Sr | Seymour, Wisconsin |
| G | 2 | PJ Pipes | 6 ft 2 in (1.88 m) | 195 lb (88 kg) | So | Woodridge, Illinois |
| G | 5 | Bansi King | 6 ft 2 in (1.88 m) | 175 lb (79 kg) | Fr | Lawrence, Kansas |
| F | 10 | Shanquan "Tank" Hemphill | 6 ft 6 in (1.98 m) | 190 lb (86 kg) | Jr | Gary, Indiana |
| G | 11 | JayQuan McCloud | 6 ft 2 in (1.88 m) | 195 lb (88 kg) | RS Jr | North Chicago, Illinois |
| F | 12 | Josh McNair | 6 ft 6 in (1.98 m) | 220 lb (100 kg) | Jr | Thornton, Colorado |
| G | 13 | Trevian Bell | 6 ft 7 in (2.01 m) | 205 lb (93 kg) | So | Joliet, Illinois |
| F | 15 | Manny Patterson | 6 ft 8 in (2.03 m) | 220 lb (100 kg) | So | Chicago, Illinois |
| F | 20 | Tyrone Powell | 6 ft 5 in (1.96 m) | 210 lb (95 kg) | So | Wauwatosa, Wisconsin |
| F | 21 | Kameron Hankerson | 6 ft 5 in (1.96 m) | 200 lb (91 kg) | Jr | Novi, Michigan |
| G | 24 | Jevon Smith | 6 ft 5 in (1.96 m) | 200 lb (91 kg) | Jr | Milwaukee, Wisconsin |
| G | 30 | Hunter Crist | 6 ft 3 in (1.91 m) | 190 lb (86 kg) | So | Crown Point, Indiana |
| G | 33 | Cody Schwartz | 6 ft 8 in (2.03 m) | 220 lb (100 kg) | RS Jr | De Pere, Wisconsin |
| F | 34 | Will Chevalier | 6 ft 9 in (2.06 m) | 240 lb (109 kg) | So | Kimberly, Wisconsin |

Head coach

- Linc Darner (Purdue)

Assistant coach(es)

- Randall Herbst (Waldorf)
- Richard Davis (Ashland)
- Ben Swank (Edinboro)

Legend

- (C) Team captain
- (S) Suspended
- (I) Ineligible
- (W) Walk-on
- Injured
- Current redshirt

Roster
Last update: November 1, 2018

== Schedule and results ==
| Date time, TV | Rank^{#} | Opponent^{#} | Result | Record | Site (attendance) city, state |
Exhibition
| Nov 1, 2018*; 7:00 pm | | Michigan Tech | W 94–74 | | Kress Events Center; Green Bay, WI |
Non-conference regular season
| Nov 6, 2018*; 11:30 am, ESPN+ | | Wisconsin Lutheran | W 110–54 | 1–0 | Kress Events Center (1,042); Green Bay, WI |
| Nov 9, 2018*; 3:30 pm, ESPN3 | | Indiana State | L 74–78 | 1–1 | Kress Events Center (1,469); Green Bay, WI |
| Nov 11, 2018*; 2:00 pm, BTN Plus | | at Iowa; 2K Classic campus game | L 82–93 | 1–2 | Carver–Hawkeye Arena (10,597); Iowa City, IA |
| Nov 16, 2018*; 6:00 pm | | at Eastern Washington; 2K Classic regional semifinals | W 82–78 ^{OT} | 2–2 | Reese Court (1,076); Cheney, WA |
| Nov 17, 2018*; 3:05 pm | | vs. Morehead State; 2K Classic sub-regional championship | W 87–70 | 3–2 | Reese Court; Cheney, WA |
| Nov 20, 2018*; 9:00 pm, P12N | | at No. 21 Oregon; 2K Classic campus game | L 72–83 | 3–3 | Matthew Knight Arena (6,569); Eugene, OR |
| Nov 28, 2018*; 7:00 pm, ESPN+ | | Northern Illinois | W 85–83 | 4–3 | Resch Center (1,669); Ashwaubenon, WI |
| Dec 1, 2018*; 1:00 pm, ESPN3 | | Belmont | W 100–92 | 5–3 | Resch Center (2,125); Ashwaubenon, WI |
| Dec 8, 2018*; 5:00 pm, ESPN+ | | at Bowling Green | L 68–97 | 5–4 | Stroh Center (1,911); Bowling Green, OH |
| Dec 11, 2018*; 7:00 pm, ESPN3 | | UW–Stout | W 112–46 | 6–4 | Kress Events Center (1,152); Green Bay, WI |
| Dec 14, 2018*; 8:00 pm, FS1 | | at Creighton | L 65–86 | 6–5 | CHI Health Center Omaha (17,147); Omaha, NE |
| Dec 16, 2018*; 4:00 pm, BTN | | at No. 9 Michigan State | L 83–104 | 6–6 | Breslin Center (14,797); East Lansing, MI |
| Dec 22, 2018*; 4:00 pm, ESPN+ | | at Evansville | L 75–80 | 6–7 | Ford Center (5,011); Evansville, IN |
Horizon League regular season
| Dec 29, 2018; 7:00 pm, ESPN+ | | at Milwaukee | W 92–82 | 7–7 (1–0) | UW–Milwaukee Panther Arena (1,634); Milwaukee, WI |
| Jan 3, 2019; 7:00 pm, ESPN+ | | Youngstown State | W 99–93 ^{OT} | 8–7 (2–0) | Resch Center (2,023); Ashwaubenon, WI |
| Jan 5, 2019; 12:00 pm, ESPN3 | | Cleveland State | W 90–89 | 9–7 (3–0) | Resch Center (2,470); Ashwaubenon, WI |
| Jan 10, 2019; 6:00 pm, ESPN+ | | at Detroit Mercy | L 83–101 | 9–8 (3–1) | Calihan Hall (1,405); Detroit, MI |
| Jan 12, 2019; 2:00 pm, ESPN+ | | at Oakland | L 78–90 | 9–9 (3–2) | Athletics Center O'rena (3,789); Auburn Hills, MI |
| Jan 17, 2019; 7:00 pm, ESPN+ | | IUPUI | L 70–76 | 9–10 (3–3) | Resch Center (2,655); Ashwaubenon, WI |
| Jan 19, 2019; 12:00 pm, ESPN+ | | UIC | W 90–85 | 10–10 (4–3) | Resch Center (2,321); Ashwaubenon, WI |
| Jan 24, 2019; 6:00 pm, ESPN+ | | at Northern Kentucky | L 65–87 | 10–11 (4–4) | BB&T Arena (3,257); Highland Heights, KY |
| Jan 26, 2019; 6:00 pm, ESPN3 | | at Wright State | L 75–87 | 10–12 (4–5) | Nutter Center (6,112); Fairborn, OH |
| Feb 1, 2019; 7:00 pm, ESPN+ | | Milwaukee | W 90–74 | 11–12 (5–5) | Kress Center (3,720); Green Bay, WI |
| Feb 7, 2019; 6:00 pm, ESPN+ | | at Cleveland State | W 82–65 | 12–12 (6–5) | Wolstein Center (1,144); Cleveland, OH |
| Feb 9, 2019; 5:00 pm, ESPN3 | | at Youngstown State | L 77–96 | 12–13 (6–6) | Beeghly Center (2,170); Youngstown, OH |
| Feb 14, 2019; 7:00 pm, ESPN+ | | Oakland | W 66–54 | 13–13 (7–6) | Resch Center (2,239); Ashwaubenon, WI |
| Feb 16, 2019; 12:00 pm, ESPN3 | | Detroit Mercy | W 82–73 | 14–13 (8–6) | Resch Center (2,419); Ashwaubenon, WI |
| Feb 22, 2019; 8:00 pm, ESPNU | | at UIC | W 63–62 | 15–13 (9–6) | Credit Union 1 Arena (2,191); Chicago, IL |
| Feb 24, 2019; 12:00 pm, ESPN+ | | at IUPUI | L 68–79 | 15–14 (9–7) | Indiana Farmers Coliseum (1,429); Indianapolis, IN |
| Feb 28, 2019; 7:00 pm, ESPN+ | | Wright State | W 70–67 | 16–14 (10–7) | Resch Center (2,281); Ashwaubenon, WI |
| Mar 2, 2019; 12:00 pm, ESPN+ | | Northern Kentucky | L 82–86 | 16–15 (10–8) | Resch Center (2,889); Ashwaubenon, WI |
Horizon League tournament
| Mar 5, 2019; 7:00 pm, ESPN+ | (4) | (5) UIC; Quarterfinals | W 82–77 | 17–15 | Resch Center (1,727); Ashwaubenon, WI |
| Mar 11, 2019; 7:00 pm, ESPNU | (4) | vs. (1) Wright State; Semifinals | L 54–66 | 17–16 | Little Caesars Arena; Detroit, MI |
CollegeInsider.com Postseason tournament
| Mar 20, 2019*; 6:00 pm, CBS Sports Live | | at East Tennessee State; First round – Hugh Durham Classic | W 102–94 | 18–16 | Freedom Hall Civic Center (2,817); Johnson City, TN |
| Mar 26, 2019*; 7:00 pm, CBS Sports Live | | FIU; Second round | W 98–68 | 19–16 | Kress Events Center (1,341); Green Bay, WI |
| Mar 29, 2019*; 6:00 pm, CBS Sports Live | | Cal State Bakersfield; Quarterfinals | W 80–65 | 20–16 | Kress Events Center (1,822); Green Bay, WI |
| Apr 2, 2019*; 7:00 pm, CBS Sports Live | | Texas Southern; Semifinals | W 87–86 ^{OT} | 21–16 | Kress Events Center (2,269); Green Bay, WI |
| Apr 4, 2019*; 7:00 pm, CBSSN | | at Marshall; Final | L 70–90 | 21–17 | Cam Henderson Center (5,748); Huntington, WV |
*Non-conference game. ^{#}Rankings from AP Poll. (#) Tournament seedings in parentheses. All times are in Central Time.
