= 2018–19 IUPUI Jaguars men's basketball team =

American college basketball season

2018–19 IUPUI Jaguars men's basketball
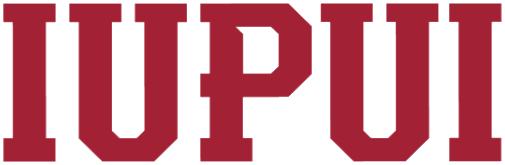

Fort Myers Tip-Off regional champions

CIT, first round
- Conference: Horizon League
- Record: 16–17 (8–10 Horizon)
- Head coach: Jason Gardner (5th season)
- Assistant coaches: Matt Crenshaw; Matt Dunn; Isaac Loechle
- Home arena: Indiana Farmers Coliseum; The Jungle

2018–19 Horizon League men's basketball standings
	Conf.				Overall
Team	W		L	PCT	W		L	PCT
Wright State	13	–	5	.722	21	–	14	.600
Northern Kentucky †	13	–	5	.722	26	–	9	.743
Oakland	11	–	7	.611	16	–	17	.485
Green Bay	10	–	8	.556	21	–	17	.553
UIC	10	–	8	.556	16	–	16	.500
Youngstown State	8	–	10	.444	12	–	20	.375
Detroit Mercy	8	–	10	.444	11	–	20	.355
IUPUI	8	–	10	.444	16	–	17	.485
Cleveland State	5	–	13	.278	10	–	21	.323
Milwaukee	4	–	14	.222	9	–	22	.290
† 2019 Horizon League tournament winner

The 2018–19 IUPUI Jaguars men's basketball team represented Indiana University – Purdue University Indianapolis during the 2018–19 NCAA Division I men's basketball season. The Jaguars, led by fifth-year head coach Jason Gardner, played their home games at Indiana Farmers Coliseum in Indianapolis, Indiana as second-year members of the Horizon League. They finished the season 16–17, 8–10 in Horizon League play, to finish in a three-way tie for sixth place. They lost in the quarterfinals of the Horizon League tournament to Wright State. They were invited to the CollegeInsider.com Tournament where they lost in the first round to Marshall.

== Previous season ==
The Jaguars finished the 2017–18 season 11–19, 8–10 in Horizon League play, to finish in a tie for fifth place. They lost in the quarterfinals of the Horizon League tournament to Oakland.

The season marked the first season as members of the Horizon League as IUPUI replaced Valparaiso who left to join the Missouri Valley Conference.

== Roster ==
2018–19 IUPUI Jaguars men's basketball team
Players
Coaches

Pos.	#	Name	Height	Weight	Year	Hometown
G	0	Jaylen Minnett	6 ft 1 in (1.85 m)	180 lb (82 kg)	RS So	Terre Haute, IN
G/F	1	Jamil Jr. Jackson	6 ft 6 in (1.98 m)	190 lb (86 kg)	Jr	Minneapolis, MN
F	2	Jakoby Kemp	6 ft 8 in (2.03 m)	190 lb (86 kg)	So	Layton, UT
F	4	Jack Hansen	6 ft 7 in (2.01 m)	205 lb (93 kg)	Fr	Noblesville, IN
G	5	Camron Justice	6 ft 3 in (1.91 m)	180 lb (82 kg)	RS Jr	Hindman, KY
G	10	Nick Rogers	6 ft 1 in (1.85 m)	170 lb (77 kg)	RS Jr	Indianapolis, IN
G	12	Chad Hudson	5 ft 11 in (1.8 m)	175 lb (79 kg)	So	Caledonia, ON
G	14	Marcus Burk (redshirt)	6 ft 3 in (1.91 m)	205 lb (93 kg)	Jr	Indianapolis, IN
C	15	Ahmed Ismail	7 ft 1 in (2.16 m)	260 lb (118 kg)	RS Sr	Cairo, Egypt
G	22	D. J. McCall	6 ft 6 in (1.98 m)	190 lb (86 kg)	RS Sr	Fort Wayne, IN
G	23	Grant Weatherford	6 ft 2 in (1.88 m)	185 lb (84 kg)	Jr	Cicero, IN
F	24	Evan Hall	6 ft 7 in (2.01 m)	230 lb (104 kg)	Sr	Hindman, KY
G	25	Trevor Johnson	6 ft 2 in (1.88 m)	170 lb (77 kg)	RS Jr	Flagstaff, AZ
F	32	Elyjah Goss	6 ft 7 in (2.01 m)	195 lb (88 kg)	RS So	Bolingbrook, IL
F	55	Daniel Alston	6 ft 0 in (1.83 m)	175 lb (79 kg)	Fr	Champaign, IL

Head coach

- Jason Gardner (Arizona)

Assistant coach(es)

- Matt Bringman (Palm Beach Atlantic)
- Matt Dunn (Fort Hays State)
- Isaac Loechle (Anderson (IN))

Legend

- (C) Team captain
- (S) Suspended
- (I) Ineligible
- (W) Walk-on
- Injured
- Current redshirt

Roster
Last update: August 5, 2024

== Schedule and results ==
Date time, TV	Rank^{#}	Opponent^{#}	Result	Record	Site (attendance) city, state
Exhibition
Oct 29, 2018*; 7:00 p.m., ESPN+		Central State	W 86–52		Indiana Farmers Coliseum (875); Indianapolis, IN
Non-conference regular season
November 6, 2018*; 8:30 p.m., FS2		at Xavier	L 69–82	0–1	Cintas Center (10,224); Cincinnati, OH
November 10, 2018*; 1:00 p.m., ESPN3		Eastern Illinois	W 71–65	1–1	Indiana Farmers Coliseum (1,350); Indianapolis, IN
November 14, 2018*; 7:30 p.m., ACCNX		at Boston College; Fort Myers Tip-Off	W 76–69	2–1	Conte Forum (3,244); Chestnut Hill, MA
November 16, 2018*; 7:00 p.m., ESPN+		at Richmond; Fort Myers Tip-Off	L 70–78	2–2	Robins Center (5,015); Richmond, VA
November 23, 2018*; 7:00 p.m.		vs. St. Francis Brooklyn; Fort Myers Tip-Off regional semifinals	W 68–48	3–2	Gallagher Center (910); Lewiston, NY
November 24, 2018*; 7:00pm		vs. Grambling State; Fort Myers Tip-Off regional finals	W 80–69	4–2	Gallagher Center (635); Lewiston, NY
November 28, 2018*; 7:00 p.m., ESPN+		Bradley	W 85–73	5–2	Indiana Farmers Coliseum (1,383); Indianapolis, IN
December 1, 2018*; 1:00 p.m., ESPN3		Ball State	L 75–85	5–3	Indiana Farmers Coliseum (2,150); Indianapolis, IN
December 6, 2018*; 7:00 p.m., ESPN+		IU Kokomo	W 95–64	6–3	Indiana Farmers Coliseum (1,287); Indianapolis, IN
December 12, 2018*; 7:00 p.m., ESPN+		IU Northwest	W 116–79	7–3	Indiana Farmers Coliseum (927); Indianapolis, IN
December 15, 2018*; 1:00 p.m., ESPN3		Western Illinois	W 82–68	8–3	Indiana Farmers Coliseum (980); Indianapolis, IN
December 18, 2018*; 7:00 p.m.		at Purdue Fort Wayne	L 77–87	8–4	Memorial Coliseum (1,984); Fort Wayne, IN
December 21, 2018*; 5:30 p.m., ESPN+		at Morehead State	L 70–74	8–5	Ellis Johnson Arena (2,874); Morehead, KY
Horizon League regular season
December 28, 2018; 7:00 p.m., ESPN+		at Northern Kentucky	L 77–92	8–6 (0–1)	BB&T Arena (3,303); Highland Heights, KY
December 30, 2018; 3:00 p.m., ESPN3		at Wright State	L 64–72	8–7 (0–2)	Nutter Center (3,795); Fairborn, OH
January 4, 2018; 7:00 p.m., ESPNU		at UIC	W 66–64	9–7 (1–2)	Credit Union 1 Arena (2,077); Chicago, IL
January 10, 2018; 7:00 p.m., ESPN3		Cleveland State	W 90–74	10–7 (2–2)	Indiana Farmers Coliseum (1,191); Indianapolis, IN
January 12, 2018; 1:00 p.m., ESPN3		Youngstown State	L 76–82	10–8 (2–3)	Indiana Farmers Coliseum (890); Indianapolis, IN
January 17, 2018; 8:00 p.m., ESPN+		at Green Bay	W 76–70	11–8 (3–3)	Resch Center (2,655); Ashwaubenon, WI
January 19, 2018; 7:00 p.m., ESPN3		at Milwaukee	L 57–64	11–9 (3–4)	UW–Milwaukee Panther Arena (1,613); Milwaukee, WI
January 24, 2018; 11:00 a.m., ESPN+		Oakland	W 73–71	12–9 (4–4)	Indiana Farmers Coliseum (2,285); Indianapolis, IN
January 26, 2018; 1:00 p.m., ESPN+		Detroit Mercy	W 80–65	13–9 (5–4)	Indiana Farmers Coliseum (1,482); Indianapolis, IN
February 1, 2018; 7:00 p.m., ESPN3		Northern Kentucky	W 83–77	14–9 (6–4)	Indiana Farmers Coliseum (1,169); Indianapolis, IN
February 3, 2018; 1:00 p.m., ESPN+		Wright State	L 74–79	14–10 (6–5)	Indiana Farmers Coliseum (1,112); Indianapolis, IN
February 9, 2018; 1:00 p.m., ESPN3		UIC	L 75–76	14–11 (6–6)	Indiana Farmers Coliseum (1,141); Indianapolis, IN
February 14, 2018; 7:00 p.m., ESPN+		at Youngstown State	L 73–75	14–12 (6–7)	Beeghly Center (1,697); Youngstown, OH
February 16, 2018; 7:00 p.m., ESPN3		at Cleveland State	L 86–89	14–13 (6–8)	Wolstein Center (1,567); Cleveland, OH
February 22, 2018; 7:00 p.m., ESPN+		Milwaukee	W 67–60	15–13 (7–8)	Indiana Farmers Coliseum (1,405); Indianapolis, IN
February 24, 2018; 1:00 p.m., ESPN+		Green Bay	W 79–68	16–13 (8–8)	Indiana Farmers Coliseum (1,429); Indianapolis, IN
February 28, 2018; 8:00 p.m., ESPN+		at Detroit Mercy	L 85–87	16–14 (8–9)	Calihan Hall (1,786); Detroit, MI
March 2, 2018; 4:00 p.m., ESPN3		at Oakland	L 63–74	16–15 (8–10)	Athletics Center O'rena (3,699); Auburn Hills, MI
Horizon League tournament
March 4, 2019; 7:00 p.m., ESPN+	(8)	(1) Wright State; Quarterfinals	L 56–71	16–16	Nutter Center (4,936); Fairborn, OH
CollegeInsider.com Postseason tournament
March 19, 2019*; 7:00 p.m.		at Marshall; First round – Jim Phelan Classic	L 73–78	16–17	Cam Henderson Center (3,725); Huntington, WV
*Non-conference game. ^{#}Rankings from AP Poll. (#) Tournament seedings in parentheses. All times are in Eastern.
