= 2018–19 Northern Kentucky Norse men's basketball team =

American college basketball season

2018–19 Northern Kentucky Norse men's basketball
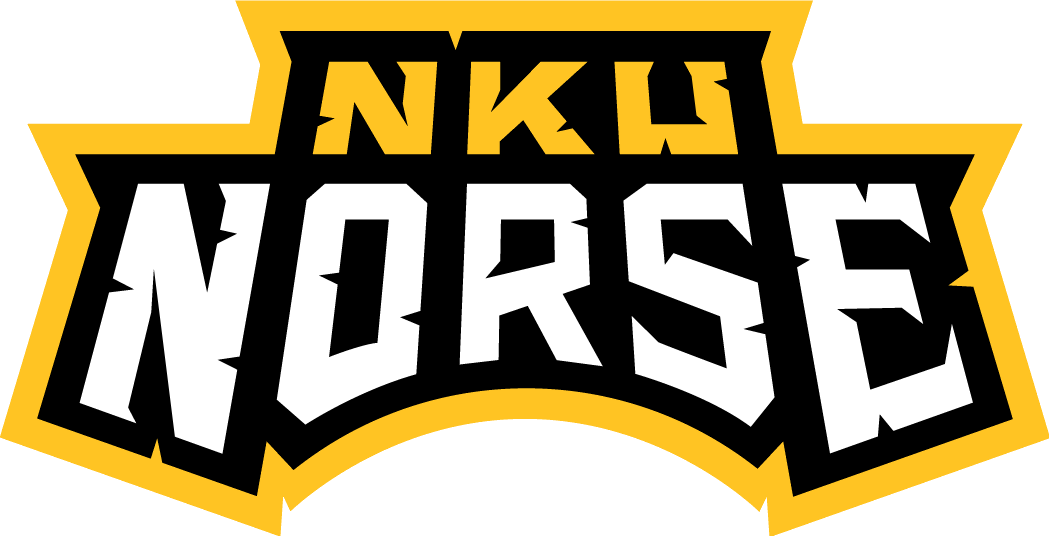

Horizon League Tournament champions Horizon League regular season co-champions NKU Basketball Classic champions

NCAA tournament, First Round
- Conference: Horizon League
- Record: 26–9 (13–5 Horizon)
- Head coach: John Brannen (4th season)
- Assistant coaches: Sean Dwyer; Tim Morris; Chris Shumate
- Home arena: BB&T Arena

2018–19 Horizon League men's basketball standings
	Conf.				Overall
Team	W		L	PCT	W		L	PCT
Wright State	13	–	5	.722	21	–	14	.600
Northern Kentucky †	13	–	5	.722	26	–	9	.743
Oakland	11	–	7	.611	16	–	17	.485
Green Bay	10	–	8	.556	21	–	17	.553
UIC	10	–	8	.556	16	–	16	.500
Youngstown State	8	–	10	.444	12	–	20	.375
Detroit Mercy	8	–	10	.444	11	–	20	.355
IUPUI	8	–	10	.444	16	–	17	.485
Cleveland State	5	–	13	.278	10	–	21	.323
Milwaukee	4	–	14	.222	9	–	22	.290
† 2019 Horizon League tournament winner

The 2018–19 Northern Kentucky Norse men's basketball team represented Northern Kentucky University (NKU) during the 2018–19 NCAA Division I men's basketball season. The Norse, led by fourth-year head coach John Brannen, played their home games at BB&T Arena in Highland Heights, Kentucky as members of the Horizon League. They finished the season 26–9, 13–5 in Horizon League play, to win a share of the regular season championship with Wright State. They defeated Detroit Mercy, Oakland, and Wright State to be champions of the Horizon League tournament. They received the Horizon League's automatic-bid to the NCAA tournament where they lost in the first round to Texas Tech.

During the season, forward Drew McDonald became the school's all-time career leader in both scoring and rebounds. He passed LaRon Moore's previous record of 859 rebounds in a December 8 loss to Eastern Kentucky, and passed Craig Sanders' previous record of 2,007 points in a win over Green Bay in the team's final regular-season game on March 2.

== Previous season ==
The Norse finished the 2017–18 season 22–10, 15–3 in Horizon League play, to win the Horizon League regular season championship. They were upset in the quarterfinals of the Horizon League tournament by No. 8 seed Cleveland State. As a regular season league champion who failed to win their league tournament, they received an automatic bid to the National Invitation Tournament where they lost in the first round to Louisville.

== Roster ==
2018–19 Northern Kentucky Norse men's basketball team
Players
Coaches

Pos.	#	Name	Height	Weight	Year	Previous school	Hometown
F	0	Silas Adheke	6 ft 10 in (2.08 m)	240 lb (109 kg)	RS So	Evansville	Chattanooga, TN
G	2	Paul Djoko	6 ft 5 in (1.96 m)	200 lb (91 kg)	RS Fr	Châlons-Reims	Strasbourg, France
G	3	Tre Cobbs	6 ft 1 in (1.85 m)	200 lb (91 kg)	Jr	Lima Central Catholic	Lima, OH
F	4	Adrian Nelson	6 ft 8 in (2.03 m)	220 lb (100 kg)	RS Fr	Pickerington Central	Pickerington, OH
G	5	Zaynah Robinson	6 ft 0 in (1.83 m)	180 lb (82 kg)	GS	Norfolk State	Atlanta, GA
G	10	Gerald Gray Jr.	6 ft 3 in (1.91 m)	170 lb (77 kg)	RS Fr	Pleasure Ridge Park	Louisville, KY
G/F	11	Jalen Tate	6 ft 6 in (1.98 m)	170 lb (77 kg)	RS So	Pickerington Central	Pickerington, OH
G	12	Trevon Faulkner	6 ft 4 in (1.93 m)	195 lb (88 kg)	RS Fr	Mercer County	Harrodsburg, KY
G	15	Tyler Sharpe	6 ft 1 in (1.85 m)	195 lb (88 kg)	Jr	Bullitt East	Mount Washington, KY
G	24	Brooks Ely	6 ft 4 in (1.93 m)	205 lb (93 kg)	Jr	Glenville State	Lexington, KY
G/F	25	Bryant Mocaby	6 ft 6 in (1.98 m)	210 lb (95 kg)	Fr	Derby	Derby, KS
G	32	Dantez Walton	6 ft 7 in (2.01 m)	210 lb (95 kg)	Jr	Lima Central Catholic	Lima, OH
C	33	Chris Vogt	7 ft 1 in (2.16 m)	240 lb (109 kg)	So	Graves County	Mayfield, KY
F/C	34	Drew McDonald	6 ft 8 in (2.03 m)	250 lb (113 kg)	Sr	Newport Central Catholic	Cold Spring, KY
F/C	44	David Wassler	6 ft 10 in (2.08 m)	235 lb (107 kg)	Fr	St. Xavier	Cincinnati, OH

Head coach

- John Brannen (Marshall)

Assistant coach(es)

- Sean Dwyer (Michigan State)
- Tim Morris (Stanford)
- Chris Shumate (Murray State)

Legend

- (C) Team captain
- (S) Suspended
- (I) Ineligible
- (W) Walk-on
- Injured
- Current redshirt

Roster

== Schedule and results ==
Date time, TV	Rank^{#}	Opponent^{#}	Result	Record	Site (attendance) city, state
Exhibition
Oct 30, 2018*; 7:00 pm		Urbana	W 84–47		BB&T Arena (2,973); Highland Heights, KY
Non-conference regular season
Nov 6, 2018*; 7:00 pm, ESPN+		Wilmington (OH)	W 102–38	1–0	BB&T Arena (2,454); Highland Heights, KY
Nov 9, 2018*; 7:00 pm, ESPN+		at Northern Illinois	W 88–85 ^{2OT}	2–0	Convocation Center (895); DeKalb, IL
Nov 11, 2018*; 6:00 pm, ESPN+		Wabash; NKU Basketball Classic	W 99–59	3–0	BB&T Arena (2,472); Highland Heights, KY
Nov 16, 2018*; 7:00 pm, ESPN3		UNC Asheville; NKU Basketball Classic	W 77–50	4–0	BB&T Arena (2,936); Highland Heights, KY
Nov 17, 2018*; 7:00 pm, ESPN3		Manhattan; NKU Basketball Classic	W 59–53	5–0	BB&T Arena (3,351); Highland Heights, KY
Nov 18, 2018*; 6:00 pm, FSOH		Coastal Carolina; NKU Basketball Classic	W 89–83	6–0	BB&T Arena (2,718); Highland Heights, KY
Nov 24, 2018*; 6:00 pm, ESPN3		at UCF	L 53–66	6–1	CFE Arena (3,374); Orlando, FL
Nov 27, 2018*; 7:30 pm, ESPN+		at Morehead State	W 93–71	7–1	Ellis Johnson Arena (2,874); Morehead, KY
Nov 30, 2018*; 7:00 pm, ESPN+		UMBC	W 78–60	8–1	BB&T Arena (3,462); Highland Heights, KY
Dec 4, 2018*; 7:00 pm, FSOH		at Cincinnati	L 65–78	8–2	Fifth Third Arena (11,218); Cincinnati, OH
Dec 8, 2018*; 6:00 pm, ESPN+		at Eastern Kentucky	L 74–76	8–3	McBrayer Arena (3,035); Richmond, KY
Dec 16, 2018*; 7:00 pm, FSOH		Miami (OH)	W 72–66	9–3	BB&T Arena (3,100); Highland Heights, KY
Dec 20, 2018*; 7:00 pm, ESPN+		Northern Illinois	W 65–62	10–3	BB&T Arena (2,757); Highland Heights, KY
Horizon League regular season
Dec 28, 2018; 7:00 pm, ESPN+		IUPUI	W 92–77	11–3 (1–0)	BB&T Arena (3,303); Highland Heights, KY
Dec 30, 2018; 6:00 pm, FSOH		UIC	W 73–58	12–3 (2–0)	BB&T Arena (2,923); Highland Heights, KY
Jan 3, 2019; 7:00 pm, ESPN+		at Oakland	L 74–76	12–4 (2–1)	Athletics Center O'rena (3,281); Auburn Hills, MI
Jan 5, 2019; 1:00 pm, ESPN+		at Detroit Mercy	W 95–73	13–4 (3–1)	Calihan Hall (1,241); Detroit, MI
Jan 11, 2019; 7:00 pm, ESPN2		Wright State; Men's Basketball Alumni Night	W 68–64	14–4 (4–1)	BB&T Arena (5,848); Highland Heights, KY
Jan 17, 2019; 7:00 pm, ESPN+		at Cleveland State	W 91–76	15–4 (5–1)	Wolstein Center (866); Cleveland, OH
Jan 19, 2019; 6:00 pm, ESPN3		at Youngstown State	W 82–74	16–4 (6–1)	Beeghly Center (2,950); Youngstown, OH
Jan 24, 2019; 7:00 pm		Green Bay	W 87–65	17–4 (7–1)	BB&T Arena (3,257); Highland Heights, KY
Jan 26, 2019; 7:00 pm		Milwaukee	W 73–60	18–4 (8–1)	BB&T Arena (4,225); Highland Heights, KY
Feb 1, 2019; 7:00 pm, ESPN+		at IUPUI	L 77–83	18–5 (8–2)	Indiana Farmers Coliseum (1,169); Indianapolis, IN
Feb 3, 2019; 4:00 pm, ESPN+		at UIC	L 67–69	18–6 (8–3)	Credit Union 1 Arena (1,060); Chicago, IL
Feb 7, 2019; 7:00 pm, ESPN+		Detroit Mercy	W 97–65	19–6 (9–3)	BB&T Arena (3,025); Highland Heights, KY
Feb 9, 2018; 7:00 pm, ESPN3		Oakland; Homecoming	W 79–64	20–6 (10–3)	BB&T Arena (6,792); Highland Heights, KY
Feb 15, 2019; 9:00 pm, ESPNU		at Wright State	L 77–81	20–7 (10–4)	Nutter Center (6,233); Fairborn, OH
Feb 21, 2019; 7:00 pm, ESPN+		Youngstown State	W 76–69	21–7 (11–4)	BB&T Arena (3,408); Highland Heights, KY
Feb 23, 2018; 7:00 pm, ESPN3		Cleveland State; Senior Night	L 77–83	21–8 (11–5)	BB&T Arena (5,047); Highland Heights, KY
Feb 28, 2019; 8:00 pm		at Milwaukee	W 65–55	22–8 (12–5)	UW–Milwaukee Panther Arena (1,792); Milwaukee, WI
Mar 2, 2019; 1:00 pm, ESPN+		at Green Bay	W 86–82	23–8 (13–5)	Resch Center (2,889); Ashwaubenon, WI
Horizon League tournament
Mar 6, 2019; 7:00 pm, ESPN+	(2)	(7) Detroit Mercy; Quarterfinals	W 99–88	24–8	BB&T Arena (3,394); Highland Heights, KY
Mar 11, 2019; 9:30 pm, ESPNU	(2)	vs. (3) Oakland; Semifinals	W 64–63	25–8	Little Caesars Arena (5,280); Detroit, MI
Mar 12, 2019; 7:00 pm, ESPN	(2)	vs. (1) Wright State; Championship	W 77–66	26–8	Little Caesars Arena (5,612); Detroit, MI
NCAA tournament
Mar 22, 2019*; 1:30 pm, TNT	(14 W)	vs. (3 W) No. 9 Texas Tech; First Round	L 57–72	26–9	BOK Center (12,352); Tulsa, OK
*Non-conference game. ^{#}Rankings from AP poll. (#) Tournament seedings in parentheses. W=West region. All times are in Eastern Time.

== Awards and honors ==
=== All-American ===
- Honorable Mention: Drew McDonald
