= 2018–19 Detroit Mercy Titans men's basketball team =

American college basketball season

2018–19 Detroit Mercy Titans men's basketball
- Conference: Horizon League
- Record: 11–20 (8–10 Horizon)
- Head coach: Mike Davis (1st season)
- Assistant coaches: Mike Davis Jr.; Tracy Dildy; Keith Legree
- Home arena: Calihan Hall

2018–19 Horizon League men's basketball standings
| | Conf. | | | | Overall |
| Team | W | | L | PCT | W | | L | PCT |
|---|---|---|---|---|---|---|---|---|
| Wright State | 13 | – | 5 | .722 | 21 | – | 14 | .600 |
| Northern Kentucky † | 13 | – | 5 | .722 | 26 | – | 9 | .743 |
| Oakland | 11 | – | 7 | .611 | 16 | – | 17 | .485 |
| Green Bay | 10 | – | 8 | .556 | 21 | – | 17 | .553 |
| UIC | 10 | – | 8 | .556 | 16 | – | 16 | .500 |
| Youngstown State | 8 | – | 10 | .444 | 12 | – | 20 | .375 |
| Detroit Mercy | 8 | – | 10 | .444 | 11 | – | 20 | .355 |
| IUPUI | 8 | – | 10 | .444 | 16 | – | 17 | .485 |
| Cleveland State | 5 | – | 13 | .278 | 10 | – | 21 | .323 |
| Milwaukee | 4 | – | 14 | .222 | 9 | – | 22 | .290 |
† 2019 Horizon League tournament winner

The 2018–19 Detroit Mercy Titans men's basketball team represented the University of Detroit Mercy during the 2018–19 NCAA Division I men's basketball season. The Titans, led by first-year head coach Mike Davis, played their home games at Calihan Hall as members of the Horizon League. They finished the season 11–20 overall, 8–10 in Horizon League play, ending in a 3-way tie for sixth place. As the No. 7 seed in the Horizon League tournament, they lost in the quarterfinals to eventual tournament champion Northern Kentucky,

== Previous season ==
The Titans finished the season 8–24, 4–14 in Horizon League play to finish in last place. They lost in the first round of the Horizon League tournament to Green Bay.

On March 26, 2018, the school fired head coach Bacari Alexander after two seasons. On June 13, the school hired Texas Southern head coach Mike Davis as the Titans' new coach.

== Departures ==
| Name | Number | Pos. | Height | Weight | Year | Hometown | Reason for departure |
|---|---|---|---|---|---|---|---|
| Kameron Chatman | 0 | G/F | 6'9" | 225 | RS Junior | Portland, OR | Declared for Draft |
| Jermaine Jackson Jr. | 1 | G | 5'10" | 172 | Freshman | Shelby Township, MI | Transferred |
| Roschon Prince | 2 | F | 6'6" | 235 | Senior | Long Beach, CA | Graduated |
| DeShawndre Black | 4 | G | 6'2" | 185 | Senior | Westland, MI | Graduated |
| Corey Allen | 5 | G | 6'3" | 206 | Sophomore | Ypsilanti, MI | Transferred to Georgia State |
| Tariq Jones | 10 | F | 6'7" | 200 | Junior | Detroit, MI | Transferred |
| Malik Eichler | 12 | F/C | 7'0" | 226 | Sophomore | Berlin, Germany | Transferred to Madonna |
| Jake Ballantyne | 13 | F | 6'9" | 240 | Freshman | Shelby Township, MI | Transferred to LIU Brooklyn |
| Jacob Joubert | 15 | G | 6'2" | 187 | Freshman | Farmington Hills, MI | Transferred to Wayne State |
| Bass Ollie | 20 | G | 6'4" | 182 | Freshman | Kalamazoo, MI | Transferred to Kalamazoo College |
| Jaleel Hogan | 21 | F | 6'7" | 260 | Senior | Saginaw, MI | Graduated |
| Ed Carter III | 24 | G | 6'1" | 179 | Sophomore | Detroit, MI | Transferred to Xavier University of Louisiana |
| Isaiah Jones | 35 | C/F | 6'11" | 222 | Senior | Antelope, CA | Graduated |

== Roster ==
2018–19 Detroit Titans men's basketball team
Players
Coaches

| Pos. | # | Name | Height | Weight | Year | Previous school | Hometown |
|---|---|---|---|---|---|---|---|
| G | 0 | Antoine Davis | 6 ft 1 in (1.85 m) | 170 lb (77 kg) | Fr | Homeschool | Birmingham, AL |
| G/F | 1 | Marquis Moore | 6 ft 6 in (1.98 m) | 215 lb (98 kg) | Fr | Woodstock Academy (CT) | Los Angeles, CA |
| G | 2 | Tra'Quan Knight | 6 ft 3 in (1.91 m) | 180 lb (82 kg) | Jr | Pensacola; Shelton State CC | Pensacola, FL |
| G | 4 | Jacob Holland | 6 ft 4 in (1.93 m) | 200 lb (91 kg) | RS Sr | Los Lunas; New Mexico Highlands; Fresno State; Otero JC | Los Lunas, NM |
| G | 5 | Juan Parrilla Jr. | 6 ft 0 in (1.83 m) | 180 lb (82 kg) | Jr | Crosby; College of the Siskiyous | Waterbury, CN |
| F | 10 | Boe Nguidjol | 6 ft 8 in (2.03 m) | 220 lb (100 kg) | Fr | Middlebrooks Academy | Los Angeles, CA |
| F | 11 | Cole Long | 6 ft 8 in (2.03 m) | 206 lb (93 kg) | Jr | Athlete Institute | St. John's, Newfoundland and Labrador |
| G/F | 13 | Chris Brandon | 6 ft 7 in (2.01 m) | 200 lb (91 kg) | Fr | Bellaire | Houston, TX |
| G/F | 14 | Derrien King | 6 ft 7 in (2.01 m) | 180 lb (82 kg) | RS Sr | Cathedral; Angelo State | Wichita, KS |
| G | 15 | Darrell Riley Jr. | 5 ft 8 in (1.73 m) | 160 lb (73 kg) | Jr | North Division; Williston State | Milwaukee, WI |
| G | 21 | Lamar Hamrick | 6 ft 4 in (1.93 m) | 190 lb (86 kg) | Jr | St. Georges Technical; San Jacinto College | New Castle, DE |
| G | 23 | Josh McFolley | 6 ft 1 in (1.85 m) | 174 lb (79 kg) | Sr | Western International High School | Detroit, MI |
| F | 24 | Harrison Curry | 6 ft 7 in (2.01 m) | 230 lb (104 kg) | Jr | Legacy (SC); Louisiana Tech | Ann Arbor, MI |
| F | 25 | Gerald Blackshear Jr. | 6 ft 9 in (2.06 m) | 220 lb (100 kg) | Sr | Western International High School | Detroit, MI |
| G | 35 | Jordan Gorman | 5 ft 9 in (1.75 m) | 155 lb (70 kg) | So | Nelson Snider; Wright State Lake Campus | Fort Wayne, IN |
| F | 41 | Willy Isiani | 6 ft 8 in (2.03 m) | 235 lb (107 kg) | Fr | ASI Prep (CA) | Tbilisi, Georgia |
| F | 55 | Musiol Gjysma | 6 ft 7 in (2.01 m) | 235 lb (107 kg) | RS Sr | Sterling Heights High School; Rochester College | Sterling Heights, MI |

Head coach

- Mike Davis (basketball coach) (Alabama)

Assistant coach(es)

- Mike Davis Jr. (UAB)
- Tracy Dildy (UIC)
- Keith Legree (Cincinnati)

Legend

- (C) Team captain
- (S) Suspended
- (I) Ineligible
- (W) Walk-on
- Injured
- Current redshirt

Roster
Last update: October 9, 2018

== Schedule and results ==
| Date time, TV | Rank^{#} | Opponent^{#} | Result | Record | High points | High rebounds | High assists | Site (attendance) city, state |
Exhibition
| Nov 3, 2018*; 7:30 pm | | Wayne State (MI); City College Series | W 79–76 | | 20 – Davis | 9 – Brandon | 4 – Davis | Calihan Hall; Detroit, MI |
Non-conference regular season
| Nov 6, 2018*; 6:00 pm, ESPN3 | | at Western Michigan | L 76–89 | 0–1 | 32 – Davis | 10 – Blackshear Jr. | 3 – Tied | University Arena (1798); Kalamazoo, MI |
| Nov 9, 2018*; 7:00 pm, ESPN3 | | at Temple; Legends Classic | L 67–83 | 0–2 | 30 – Davis | 9 – Brandon | 6 – McFolley | Liacouras Center (4,649); Philadelphia, PA |
| Nov 12, 2018*; 6:30 pm, FS1 | | at Butler | L 63–84 | 0–3 | 20 – Davis | 7 – Blackshear Jr. | 2 – Tied | Hinkle Fieldhouse (7,741); Indianapolis, IN |
| Nov 15, 2018*; 10:00 pm, P12N | | at California; Legends Classic | Cancelled | | | | | Haas Pavilion; Berkeley, CA |
| Nov 19, 2018*; 7:30 pm, FloHoops | | at Loyola (MD); Legends Classic | W 91–63 | 1–3 | 42 – Davis | 9 – Blackshear Jr. | 5 – Davis | Calihan Hall (1,343); Detroit, MI |
| Nov 20, 2018*; 7:30 pm, FloHoops | | at Bowling Green; Legends Classic | W 82–67 | 2–3 | 32 – Davis | 7 – King | 56 – Davis | Calihan Hall (1,367); Detroit, MI |
| Nov 24, 2018*; 2:00 pm, ESPN+ | | at Eastern Michigan | W 78–74 | 3–3 | 24 – Davis | 7 – Davis | 7 – Davis | Convocation Center (1,226); Ypsilanti, MI |
| Nov 28, 2018*; 7:05 pm, ESPN3 | | Kent State | L 72–76 | 3–4 | 30 – Davis | 9 – Hamrick | 4 – Hamrick | Calihan Hall (1,170); Detroit, MI |
| Dec 1, 2018*; 5:00 pm, ESPN3 | | at Akron | L 59–71 | 3–5 | 27 – Davis | 7 – McFolley | 2 – Davis | James A. Rhodes Arena (2,364); Akron, OH |
| Dec 4, 2018*; 7:00 pm, ESPN+ | | at Dayton | L 59–98 | 3–6 | 18 – Davis | 4 – 3 6ied | 4 – Davis | UD Arena (12,700); Dayton, OH |
| Dec 5, 2018*; 7:00 pm, ESPN3 | | at Toledo | L 57–101 | 3–7 | 19 – Davis | 6 – Davis | 4 – Davis | Savage Arena (3,629); Toledo, OH |
| Dec 15, 2018*; 1:0 pm, ESPN+ | | Ohio | L 61–63 | 3–8 | 19 – Davis | 9 – Brandon | 2 – 3 tied | Calihan Hall (1,656); Detroit, MI |
| Dec 21, 2018*; 7:00 pm, FS2 | | at Xavier | L 55–69 | 3–9 | 19 – Davis | 8 – King | 6 – McFolley | Cintas Center (10,224); Cincinnati, OH |
Horizon League regular season
| Dec 28, 2018; 2:00 pm, ESPN+ | | at Youngstown State | W 78–66 | 4–9 (1–0) | 27 – Davis | 8 – Hamrick | 4 – Hamrick | Beeghly Center (2,129); Youngstown, OH |
| Dec 30, 2018; 5:00 pm, ESPN+ | | at Cleveland State | W 73–61 | 5–9 (2–0) | 17 – Davis | 11 – Hamrick | 6 – Davis | Wolstein Center (885); Cleveland, OH |
| Jan 3, 2019; 7:00 pm, ESPN+ | | Wright State | W 79–58 | 6–9 (3–0) | 48 – Davis | 8 – Blackshear Jr. | 5 – McFolley | Calihan Hall (1,243); Detroit, MI |
| Jan 5, 2019; 1:00 pm, ESPN+ | | Northern Kentucky | L 73–95 | 6–10 (3–1) | 33 – Davis | 6 – Tied | 4 – McFolley | Calihan Hall (1,241); Detroit, MI |
| Jan 10, 2019; 7:00 pm, ESPN+ | | Green Bay | W 101–83 | 7–10 (4–1) | 29 – McFolley | 10 – Curry | 5 – Davis | Calihan Hall (1,405); Detroit, MI |
| Jan 12, 2019; 1:00 pm, ESPN+ | | Milwaukee | W 93–84 | 8–10 (5–1) | 32 – Davis | 8 – Brandon | 7 – Davis | Calihan Hall (3,010); Detroit, MI |
| Jan 19, 2019; 2:00 pm, ESPN+ | | Oakland | L 73–79 | 8–11 (5–2) | 19 – Davis | 8 – Blackshear Jr. | 4 – Moore | Calihan Hall (4,125); Detroit, MI |
| Jan 24, 2019; 8:00 pm, ESPN+ | | at UIC | L 67–79 | 8–12 (5–3) | 28 – Davis | 8 – Blackshear Jr. | 4 – King | Credit Union 1 Arena (2,782); Chicago, IL |
| Jan 26, 2019; 1:00 pm, ESPN+ | | at IUPUI | L 65–80 | 8–13 (5–4) | 20 – Isiana | 7 – Curry | 7 – Riley Jr. | Indiana Farmers Coliseum (1,482); Indianapolis, IN |
| Jan 31, 2019; 7:00 pm, ESPN+ | | Cleveland State | W 78–64 | 9–13 (6–4) | 29 – Davis | 14 – Blackshear Jr. | 4 – Isiana | Calihan Hall (1,805); Detroit, MI |
| Feb 2, 2019; 1:00 pm, ESPN3 | | Youngstown State | L 70–72 | 9–14 (6–5) | 23 – Davis | 11 – Blackshear Jr. | 3 – Hamrick | Calihan Hall (1,817); Detroit, MI |
| Feb 7, 2019; 7:00 pm, ESPN+ | | at Northern Kentucky | L 65–97 | 9–15 (6–6) | 26 – Davis | 5 – Curry | 4 – Davis | BB&T Arena (3,025); Highland Heights, KY |
| Feb 9, 2019; 7:00 pm, ESPN+ | | at Wright State | L 60–83 | 9–16 (6–7) | 17 – Davis | 8 – Curry | 1 – Davis | Nutter Center (5,045); Fairborn, OH |
| Feb 14, 2019; 8:00 pm, ESPN+ | | at Milwaukee | W 90–84 | 10–16 (7–7) | 27 – Davis | 11 – Moore | 4 – Davis | UW–Milwaukee Panther Arena (1,506); Milwaukee, WI |
| Feb 16, 2019; 1:00 pm, ESPN3 | | at Green Bay | L 73–82 | 10–17 (7–8) | 22 – Davis | 7 – Curry | 4 – Davis | Resch Center (2,419); Ashwaubenon, WI |
| Feb 23, 2019; 3:00 pm, ESPN3 | | at Oakland | L 75–95 | 10–18 (7–9) | 20 – Davis | 10 – Blackshear Jr. | 6 – Davis | Athletics Center O'rena (4,141); Auburn Hills, MI |
| Feb 28, 2019; 8:00 pm, ESPN+ | | IUPUI | W 87–85 | 11–18 (8–9) | 23 – McFolley | 10 – Moore | 6 – Davis | Calihan Hall (1,786); Detroit, MI |
| Mar 2, 2019; 4:00 pm, ESPN+ | | UIC | L 71–80 | 11–19 (8–10) | 25 – Davis | 7 – Blackshear Jr. | 4 – McFolley | Calihan Hall (1,963); Detroit, MI |
Horizon League tournament
| March 6, 2019; 7:00 pm, ESPN+ | (7) | (2) Northern Kentucky; Quarterfinals | L 88–99 | 11–20 | 30 – Davis | 8 – Moore | 8 – Davis | BB&T Arena (3,394); Highland Heights, KY |
*Non-conference game. ^{#}Rankings from AP Poll. (#) Tournament seedings in parentheses. All times are in Eastern Time.
