= John Brannen (basketball) =

American basketball coach

Biographical details
- Born: January 18, 1974 (age 52); Alexandria, Kentucky, U.S.

Playing career
- 1992–1994: Morehead State
- 1995–1997: Marshall

Coaching career (HC unless noted)
- 1999–2000: Charleston (assistant)
- 2000–2003: Eastern Kentucky (assistant)
- 2003–2006: St. Bonaventure (assistant)
- 2006–2009: VCU (assistant)
- 2009–2013: Alabama (assistant)
- 2013–2015: Alabama (assoc. HC)
- 2015: Alabama (interim HC)
- 2015–2019: Northern Kentucky
- 2019–2021: Cincinnati
- 2022–2023: Dayton (analyst & special asst.)

Head coaching record
- Overall: 114–72 (.613)
- Tournaments: 0–2 (NCAA Division I); 1–2 (NIT)

Accomplishments and honors

Championships
- 2 Horizon League tournament (2017, 2019); 2 Horizon League regular season (2018, 2019); AAC regular season (2020)

Awards
- Horizon League Coach of the Year (2017)

John Brannen (born January 18, 1974) is an American basketball coach, mostly recently serving as a program analyst and senior special assistant for the University of Dayton Flyers. Brannen previously spent two seasons as the men's basketball coach of the University of Cincinnati Bearcats and four seasons as the head coach for the Northern Kentucky University Norse. Before that he spent nine seasons as an assistant coach to Anthony Grant at both VCU and Alabama. For the Tide's two games in the 2015 National Invitation Tournament, Brannen served as interim head coach.

== Playing career ==
Brannen played at Newport Central Catholic High School in Newport, Kentucky, followed by a college career at Morehead State before transferring to Marshall for his final two seasons. As a junior, Brannen would play with teammate Jason Williams and was coached by Billy Donovan and then assistant Gregg Marshall. As a senior, Brannen led the Southern Conference in scoring and was named the 1997 league tournament MVP. Brannen played two seasons of professional basketball in Belgium's First Division before returning to the States to begin his coaching career.

He was inducted into the Marshall Athletics Hall of Fame in 2019.

== Coaching career ==
Brannen held assistant coaching positions at Charleston, Eastern Kentucky and St. Bonaventure before being hired by former Marshall assistant Anthony Grant, who had just been named head coach at VCU. Brannen spent three seasons at VCU before following Grant to Alabama, where he was an assistant for six seasons (the last two as associate head coach). When Grant was fired following the Tide's 2015 SEC tournament loss, Brannen was named interim head coach for the team's NIT appearance. The Tide were knocked out of the tournament by Miami in the second round following a first round home win over Illinois.

=== Northern Kentucky ===
Brannen is a Kentucky native and was named the head coach of NKU, the fifth in program history, on April 7, 2015. In 2017, Brannen led the Norse to the Horizon League championship and the NCAA tournament in the school's first season of full Division I eligibility, the first team since 1970 to do so. Brannen was also named the 2017 Coach of the Year in the Horizon League. In his four seasons with the Norse Brannen earned two NCAA berths, two Horizon League regular season titles, and two Horizon League tournament championships.

=== Cincinnati ===
On April 14, 2019, Brannen was named the new head coach of Cincinnati.

In his first season, Brannen lead the Bearcats to a 20–10 record earning a share of the regular season American Athletic Conference title and the 1st overall seed in the conference tournament. However, the season was abruptly ended due to the ongoing COVID-19 pandemic. The Bearcats were led by Jarron Cumberland and Trevon Scott, playing in a 2019–20 season record seven overtime games over the course of the season.

With a new roster and added struggles including a 25-day COVID-19 pause, the Bearcats ended Brannen's second year fifth overall in the regular season with a 12–11 overall record. The team did make a surprise run to the conference tournament championship game before losing to an eventual Final Four team in Houston.

==== Dismissal ====
Within two days after the conference tournament championship, the Bearcats saw six players enter the transfer portal. On March 26, the AD John Cunningham announced the university would begin investigating allegations against the program. On April 3, it was announced that Brannen was placed on indefinite leave. On April 9, Cincinnati announced John Brannen had been relieved of his duties effective immediately. On September 8, 2022, it was announced that Brannen and the University of Cincinnati had reached an amicable resolution, later announced to be a $2.75 million settlement.

=== Return to coaching ===
Brannen rejoined Anthony Grant as a program analyst and senior special assistant for Dayton for the 2022–23 season. Brannen left the program after one year.

== Personal life ==
Brannen is married to Lisa (née Elswick), with whom he has twin daughters. He is originally from Alexandria, Kentucky. He received his bachelor's degree in business management from Marshall University in 1997 and was a Rhodes Scholar finalist as a college senior.

== Head coaching record ==
Record table
| Season | Team | Overall | Conference | Standing | Postseason |
|---|---|---|---|---|---|
Alabama Crimson Tide (Southeastern Conference) (2015)
| 2014–15 | Alabama | 1–1 | 0–0 | | NIT Second Round |
| Alabama: | | 1–1 (.500) | | | |
Northern Kentucky Norse (Horizon League) (2015–2019)
| 2015–16 | Northern Kentucky | 9–21 | 5–13 | 8th | |
| 2016–17 | Northern Kentucky | 24–11 | 12–6 | T–3rd | NCAA Division I Round of 64 |
| 2017–18 | Northern Kentucky | 22–10 | 15–3 | 1st | NIT First Round |
| 2018–19 | Northern Kentucky | 26–9 | 13–5 | T–1st | NCAA Division I Round of 64 |
| Northern Kentucky: | | 81–51 (.614) | 45–27 (.625) | | |
Cincinnati Bearcats (American Athletic Conference) (2019–2021)
| 2019–20 | Cincinnati | 20–10 | 13–5 | T–1st | No postseason held |
| 2020–21 | Cincinnati | 12–11 | 8–6 | 5th | |
| Cincinnati: | | 32–20 (.604) | 21–11 (.656) | | |
| Total: | | 114–72 (.613) | | | |
National champion Postseason invitational champion Conference regular season champion Conference regular season and conference tournament champion Division regular season champion Division regular season and conference tournament champion Conference tournament champion

1.Cancelled due to the Coronavirus Pandemic
