= 2018–19 Milwaukee Panthers men's basketball team =

American college basketball season

2018–19 Milwaukee Panthers men's basketball
- Conference: Horizon League
- Record: 9–22 (4–14 Horizon)
- Head coach: Pat Baldwin (2nd season)
- Assistant coaches: Paris Parham; Terrance McGee; Pat Monaghan
- Home arena: UW–Milwaukee Panther Arena; Klotsche Center

2018–19 Horizon League men's basketball standings
	Conf.				Overall
Team	W		L	PCT	W		L	PCT
Wright State	13	–	5	.722	21	–	14	.600
Northern Kentucky †	13	–	5	.722	26	–	9	.743
Oakland	11	–	7	.611	16	–	17	.485
Green Bay	10	–	8	.556	21	–	17	.553
UIC	10	–	8	.556	16	–	16	.500
Youngstown State	8	–	10	.444	12	–	20	.375
Detroit Mercy	8	–	10	.444	11	–	20	.355
IUPUI	8	–	10	.444	16	–	17	.485
Cleveland State	5	–	13	.278	10	–	21	.323
Milwaukee	4	–	14	.222	9	–	22	.290
† 2019 Horizon League tournament winner

The 2018–19 Milwaukee Panthers men's basketball team represented the University of Wisconsin–Milwaukee during the 2018–19 NCAA Division I men's basketball season. The Panthers, led by second-year head coach Pat Baldwin, played their home games at the UW–Milwaukee Panther Arena and the Klotsche Center as members of the Horizon League. They finished the season 9–22, 4–14 in Horizon League play to finish in last place. They failed to qualify for the Horizon League tournament.

== Previous season ==
The Panthers finished the 2017–18 season 16–17, 8–10 in Horizon League play to finish in a tie for fifth place. They defeated UIC in the quarterfinals of the Horizon League tournament before losing in the semifinals to Wright State.

== Roster ==
2018–19 Milwaukee Panthers men's basketball team
Players
Coaches

Pos.	#	Name	Height	Weight	Year	Hometown
G	0	Bryce Barnes	5 ft 11 in (1.8 m)	172 lb (78 kg)	Jr	Chicago, Illinois
G	1	DeAndre Abram	6 ft 8 in (2.03 m)	205 lb (93 kg)	RS Jr	Carrollton, Texas
G	2	Bobby Arthur-Williams	6 ft 7 in (2.01 m)	217 lb (98 kg)	Jr	Potomac, Maryland
G	3	Te'Jon Lucas (redshirt)	6 ft 3 in (1.91 m)	180 lb (82 kg)	Jr	Milwaukee, Wisconsin
F/C	4	Wil Sessoms	6 ft 8 in (2.03 m)	220 lb (100 kg)	Jr	Linden, New Jersey
G	5	Carson Warren-Newsome	6 ft 5 in (1.96 m)	185 lb (84 kg)	So	Waukegan, Illinois
F	11	Vancee Johnson	6 ft 8 in (2.03 m)	230 lb (104 kg)	Sr	Calumet City, Illinois
F/C	12	Amir Allen	6 ft 8 in (2.03 m)	210 lb (95 kg)	So	Randolph, New Jersey
G	13	Jake Wright	6 ft 4 in (1.93 m)	190 lb (86 kg)	Sr	Hopkins, Minnesota
F/C	14	Harrison Henderson	6 ft 10 in (2.08 m)	225 lb (102 kg)	Jr	Dallas, Texas
G	20	Darius Roy	6 ft 2 in (1.88 m)	180 lb (82 kg)	Jr	Lawton, Oklahoma
G/F	22	Shae Mitchell	6 ft 7 in (2.01 m)	175 lb (79 kg)	Fr	Lakeville, Minnesota
G	25	Jamar Madge	6 ft 3 in (1.91 m)	170 lb (77 kg)	Fr	Kansas City, Missouri
G	34	Tyler Behrendt	5 ft 11 in (1.8 m)	165 lb (75 kg)	RS So	Germantown, Wisconsin
F	54	Elijah Goodman	6 ft 5 in (1.96 m)	225 lb (102 kg)	RS Sr	Brookfield, Wisconsin

Head coach

- Patrick Baldwin (Northwestern)

Assistant coach(es)

- Paris Parham (Minnesota State)
- Terrance McGee (Missouri State)
- Pat Monaghan (Lewis)

Legend

- (C) Team captain
- (S) Suspended
- (I) Ineligible
- (W) Walk-on
- Injured
- Current redshirt

Roster
Last update: February 4, 2024

== Schedule and results ==
Date time, TV	Opponent	Result	Record	Site (attendance) city, state
Exhibition
Oct 31, 2018*; 7:00 pm	Concordia (WI)	W 92–64		Klotsche Center (825); Milwaukee, WI
Non-conference regular season
Nov 6, 2018*; 6:00 pm, ACCN Extra	at Boston College	L 53–73	0–1	Conte Forum (3,763); Chestnut Hill, MA
Nov 10, 2018*; 6:00 pm, ESPN3	North Dakota	L 60–63	0–2	UW–Milwaukee Panther Arena (2,165); Milwaukee, WI
Nov 13, 2018*; 6:00 pm	at FIU	L 83–86	0–3	Ocean Bank Convocation Center (773); Miami, FL
Nov 16, 2018*; 6:00 pm, ESPN3	at Cincinnati	L 63–74	0–4	Fifth Third Arena (10,163); Cincinnati, OH
Nov 20, 2018*; 7:00 pm	LIU Brooklyn; Basketball Hall of Fame Belfast Classic campus game	W 92–87 ^{OT}	1–4	UW–Milwaukee Panther Arena (895); Milwaukee, WI
Nov 23, 2018*; 7:00 pm	Albany; Basketball Hall of Fame Belfast Classic campus game	W 79–70	2–4	UW–Milwaukee Panther Arena (952); Milwaukee, WI
Nov 30, 2018*; 4:30 am, BBC Sport	vs. No. 21 Buffalo; Basketball Hall of Fame Belfast Classic semifinals	L 77–96	2–5	SSE Arena; Belfast, Northern Ireland
Dec 1, 2018*; 7:00 am, CBSSN	vs. Stephen F. Austin; Basketball Hall of Fame Belfast Classic 3rd-place game	L 51–66	2–6	SSE Arena; Belfast, Northern Ireland
Dec 6, 2018*; 7:00 pm, FSWI	Drake	L 61–75	2–7	UW–Milwaukee Panther Arena (1,395); Milwaukee, WI
Dec 9, 2018*; 3:00 pm, FSWI	at North Dakota	L 72–83	2–8	Betty Engelstad Sioux Center (1,547); Grand Forks, ND
Dec 13, 2018*; 6:00 pm	at UMKC	W 69–66	3–8	Municipal Auditorium (987); Kansas City, MO
Dec 16, 2018*; 4:00 pm	Wisconsin Lutheran	W 87–64	4–8	Klotsche Center (870); Milwaukee, WI
Dec 22, 2018*; 2:00 pm	at Western Michigan	W 67–66	5–8	University Arena (2,078); Kalamazoo, MI
Horizon League regular season
Dec 29, 2018; 7:00 pm, FSWI	Green Bay	L 82–92	5–9 (0–1)	UW–Milwaukee Panther Arena (1,634); Milwaukee, WI
Jan 3, 2019; 7:00 pm, ESPN+	Cleveland State	W 83–76	6–9 (1–1)	UW–Milwaukee Panther Arena (1,001); Milwaukee, WI
Jan 5, 2019; 4:00 pm, MY24 Sports	Youngstown State	L 51–76	6–10 (1–2)	UW–Milwaukee Panther Arena (1,160); Milwaukee, WI
Jan 10, 2019; 6:00 pm, ESPN+	at Oakland	W 67–64	7–10 (2–2)	Athletics Center O'rena (2,752); Auburn Hills, MI
Jan 12, 2019; 12:00 pm, ESPN+	at Detroit Mercy	L 84–93	7–11 (2–3)	Calihan Hall (3,010); Detroit, MI
Jan 17, 2019; 7:00 pm, FSWI	UIC	W 81–69	8–11 (3–3)	UW–Milwaukee Panther Arena (1,654); Milwaukee, WI
Jan 19, 2019; 6:00 pm, ESPN3	IUPUI	W 64–57	9–11 (4–3)	UW–Milwaukee Panther Arena (1,613); Milwaukee, WI
Jan 24, 2019; 6:00 pm, ESPN+	at Wright State	L 54–56	9–12 (4–4)	Nutter Center (3,469); Fairborn, OH
Jan 26, 2019; 6:00 pm, FSWI+	at Northern Kentucky	L 60–73	9–13 (4–5)	BB&T Arena (4,225); Highland Heights, KY
Feb 1, 2019; 7:00 pm, ESPN+	at Green Bay	L 74–90	9–14 (4–6)	Resch Center (3,720); Ashwaubenon, WI
Feb 7, 2019; 6:00 pm, ESPN3	at Youngstown State	L 71–72	9–15 (4–7)	Beeghly Center (1,572); Youngstown, OH
Feb 9, 2019; 2:00 pm, ESPN+	at Cleveland State	L 68–78	9–16 (4–8)	Wolstein Center (1,708); Cleveland, OH
Feb 14, 2019; 7:00 pm, ESPN+	Detroit Mercy	L 84–90	9–17 (4–9)	UW–Milwaukee Panther Arena (1,506); Milwaukee, WI
Feb 16, 2019; 6:00 pm, ESPN3	Oakland	L 73–89	9–18 (4–10)	UW–Milwaukee Panther Arena (2,440); Milwaukee, WI
Feb 22, 2019; 6:00 pm, ESPN+	at IUPUI	L 60–67	9–19 (4–11)	Indiana Farmers Coliseum (1,405); Indianapolis, IN
Feb 24, 2019; 3:15 pm, ESPN+	at UIC	L 59–74	9–20 (4–12)	Credit Union 1 Arena (2,325); Chicago, IL
Feb 28, 2019; 7:00 pm, FSWI	Northern Kentucky	L 55–65	9–21 (4–13)	UW–Milwaukee Panther Arena (1,792); Milwaukee, WI
Mar 2, 2019; 6:00 pm, ESPN+	Wright State	L 62–65	9–22 (4–14)	UW–Milwaukee Panther Arena (2,114); Milwaukee, WI
*Non-conference game. ^{#}Rankings from AP Poll. (#) Tournament seedings in parentheses. All times are in Eastern Time.
