= 2018–19 UIC Flames men's basketball team =

American college basketball season

2018–19 UIC Flames men's basketball
- Conference: Horizon League
- Record: 16–16 (10–8 Horizon)
- Head coach: Steve McClain (4th season)
- Assistant coaches: Seth Cooper; Tony Harvey; Dee Brown
- Home arena: Credit Union 1 Arena

2018–19 Horizon League men's basketball standings
	Conf.				Overall
Team	W		L	PCT	W		L	PCT
Wright State	13	–	5	.722	21	–	14	.600
Northern Kentucky †	13	–	5	.722	26	–	9	.743
Oakland	11	–	7	.611	16	–	17	.485
Green Bay	10	–	8	.556	21	–	17	.553
UIC	10	–	8	.556	16	–	16	.500
Youngstown State	8	–	10	.444	12	–	20	.375
Detroit Mercy	8	–	10	.444	11	–	20	.355
IUPUI	8	–	10	.444	16	–	17	.485
Cleveland State	5	–	13	.278	10	–	21	.323
Milwaukee	4	–	14	.222	9	–	22	.290
† 2019 Horizon League tournament winner

The 2018–19 UIC Flames men's basketball team represented the University of Illinois at Chicago in the 2018–19 NCAA Division I men's basketball season. The Flames, led by fourth-year head coach Steve McClain, played their home games at Credit Union 1 Arena as members of the Horizon League. They finished the season 16–16, 10–8 in Horizon League play to finish in a tie for fourth place. They lost in the quarterfinals of the Horizon League tournament to Green Bay.

== Previous season ==
The Flames finished the 2017–18 season 20–16, 12–6 in Horizon League play to finish in third place. They lost in the quarterfinals of the Horizon League tournament to Milwaukee. They were invited to the CollegeInsider.com Tournament where they defeated Saint Francis (PA), Austin Peay, and Liberty to advance to the championship game where they lost to Northern Colorado.

== Roster ==
2018–19 UIC Flames men's basketball team
Players
Coaches

Pos.	#	Name	Height	Weight	Year	Hometown
G	0	Dominique Matthews	6 ft 2 in (1.88 m)	200 lb (91 kg)	RS Jr	Chicago, Illinois
G	1	Marcus Ottey	6 ft 2 in (1.88 m)	185 lb (84 kg)	Jr	Ajax, Ontario, Canada
F	2	Michael Diggins	6 ft 8 in (2.03 m)	190 lb (86 kg)	So	Las Vegas, Nevada
F	3	Jacob Wiley	6 ft 7 in (2.01 m)	205 lb (93 kg)	So	Houston, Texas
G/F	4	Tarkus Ferguson	6 ft 4 in (1.93 m)	190 lb (86 kg)	Jr	Belleville, Illinois
G	5	Ralph Bissainthe	6 ft 6 in (1.98 m)	205 lb (93 kg)	So	North Miami, Florida
F	10	Deon Ejim	6 ft 7 in (2.01 m)	240 lb (109 kg)	RS Fr	Toronto, Ontario, Canada
F	13	Jordan Blount	6 ft 8 in (2.03 m)	235 lb (107 kg)	Jr	Cork, Ireland
F	14	Brandon John	6 ft 9 in (2.06 m)	200 lb (91 kg)	So	Brantford, Ontario, Canada
G/F	20	Jamie Ahale	6 ft 5 in (1.96 m)	200 lb (91 kg)	So	Montrose, Australia
F	22	Rob Howard	6 ft 8 in (2.03 m)	230 lb (104 kg)	Jr	Gary, Indiana
C	23	Abraham Makumator	7 ft 0 in (2.13 m)	235 lb (107 kg)	Fr	Accra, Ghana
G	25	Godwin Boahen	5 ft 11 in (1.8 m)	180 lb (82 kg)	Jr	Toronto, Ontario, Canada
G	33	Muhammed Edunjobi	6 ft 4 in (1.93 m)	210 lb (95 kg)	Fr	Crete, Illinois
F	35	Travell Washington	6 ft 9 in (2.06 m)	235 lb (107 kg)	Fr	San Bernardino, California

Head coach

- Steve McClain (Chadron State)

Assistant coach(es)

- Seth Cooper (Edgewood)
- Tony Harvey (Cameron)
- Dee Brown (Illinois)

Legend

- (C) Team captain
- (S) Suspended
- (I) Ineligible
- (W) Walk-on
- Injured
- Current redshirt

Roster
Last update: November 3, 2018

== Schedule and results ==
Date time, TV	Rank^{#}	Opponent^{#}	Result	Record	Site (attendance) city, state
Exhibition
Nov 1, 2018*; 7:00 pm		Illinois Wesleyan	W 81–60		UIC Pavilion (Note: UIC Pavilion was renamed Credit Union 1 Arena on November 15, 2018.) (1,043); Chicago, IL
Non-conference season
Nov 6, 2018*; 6:00 pm, ACCN Extra		at Notre Dame; Gotham Classic	L 67–84	0–1	Edmund P. Joyce Center (6,462); South Bend, IN
Nov 9, 2018*; 8:00 pm, ESPN+		at Radford; Gotham Classic	L 78–88	0–2	Dedmon Center (1,477); Radford, VA
Nov 12, 2018*; 7:00 pm, ESPN+		at Duquesne; Gotham Classic	L 88–89 ^{OT}	0–3	Palumbo Center (1,540); Pittsburgh, PA
Nov 15, 2018*; 7:00 pm, NBCSC		William & Mary; Gotham Classic	W 100–95 ^{OT}	1–3	Credit Union 1 Arena (2,409); Chicago, IL
Nov 17, 2018*; 7:00 pm, ESPN3		Bradley	W 71–70	2–3	Credit Union 1 Arena (1,423); Chicago, IL
Nov 24, 2018*; 3:15 pm, ESPN+		UW–Parkside	W 94–74	3–3	Credit Union 1 Arena (1,031); Chicago, IL
Nov 28, 2018*; 6:00 pm, NBCSC		at Saint Joseph's	L 75–89	3–4	Hagan Arena (3,019); Philadelphia, PA
Dec 1, 2018*; 3:15 pm, NBCSC		Loyola–Chicago	L 64–73	3–5	Credit Union 1 Arena (3,539); Chicago, IL
Dec 5, 2018*; 6:00 pm, NBCSC		Illinois State	W 94–75	4–5	Credit Union 1 Arena (2,197); Chicago, IL
Dec 8, 2018*; 5:00 pm, P12N		at Colorado	L 72-84	4-6	CU Events Center (7,277); Boulder, CO
Dec 14, 2018*; 6:00 pm, FS1		at DePaul	L 70-90	4-7	Wintrust Arena (4,136); Chicago, IL
Dec 17, 2018*; 7:00 pm, ESPN+		Incarnate Word	W 63-57	5-7	Credit Union 1 Arena (1,152); Chicago, IL
Dec 21, 2018*; 7:00 pm, NBCSC		St. Francis (IL)	W 76-55	6-7	Credit Union 1 Arena (1,096); Chicago, IL
Horizon League regular season
Dec 28, 2018; 6:00 pm, ESPN2		at Wright State	W 75–72 ^{OT}	7–7 (1–0)	Nutter Center (3,506); Fairborn, OH
Dec 30, 2018; 5:00 pm, ESPN+		at Northern Kentucky	L 58–73	7–8 (1–1)	BB&T Arena (2,939); Highland Heights, KY
Jan 4, 2019; 6:00 pm, ESPNU		IUPUI	L 64–66	7–9 (1–2)	Credit Union 1 Arena (2,077); Chicago, IL
Jan 10, 2019; 7:00 pm, ESPN3		Youngstown State	W 78–63	8–9 (2–2)	Credit Union 1 Arena (2,026); Chicago, IL
Jan 12, 2019; 3:15 pm, ESPN3		Cleveland State	W 73–56	9–9 (3–2)	Credit Union 1 Arena (2,068); Chicago, IL
Jan 17, 2019; 7:00 pm, ESPN+		at Milwaukee	L 69–81	9–10 (3–3)	UW–Milwaukee Panther Arena (1,654); Milwaukee, WI
Jan 19, 2019; 12:00 pm, ESPN+		at Green Bay	L 85–90	9–11 (3–4)	Resch Center (2,321); Ashwaubenon, WI
Jan 24, 2019; 7:00 pm, ESPN+		Detroit Mercy	W 79–67	10–11 (4–4)	Credit Union 1 Arena (2,782); Chicago, IL
Jan 26, 2019; 3:15 pm, ESPN3		Oakland	L 67–80	10–12 (4–5)	Credit Union 1 Arena (3,060); Chicago, IL
Feb 1, 2019; 8:00 pm, ESPNU		Wright State	W 67–53	11–12 (5–5)	Credit Union 1 Arena (2,156); Chicago, IL
Feb 3, 2019; 3:15 pm, ESPN+		Northern Kentucky	W 69–67	12–12 (6–5)	Credit Union 1 Arena (1,060); Chicago, IL
Feb 9, 2019; 12:00 pm, ESPN3		at IUPUI	W 76–75	13–12 (7–5)	Indiana Farmers Coliseum (1,141); Indianapolis, IN
Feb 14, 2019; 6:00 pm, ESPN+		at Cleveland State	W 81–77	14–12 (8–5)	Wolstein Center (798); Cleveland, OH
Feb 16, 2019; 5:00 pm, ESPN+		at Youngstown State	L 73–81	14–13 (8–6)	Beeghly Center (4,917); Youngstown, OH
Feb 22, 2019; 8:00 pm, ESPNU		Green Bay	L 62–63	14–14 (8–7)	Credit Union 1 Arena (2,191); Chicago, IL
Feb 24, 2019; 3:15 pm, ESPN+		Milwaukee	W 74-59	15-14 (9-7)	Credit Union 1 Arena; Chicago, IL
Feb 28, 2019; 6:00 pm, ESPN+		at Oakland	L 72–86	15–15 (9–8)	Athletics Center O'rena (2,325); Auburn Hills, MI
Mar 2, 2019; 3:00 pm, ESPN+		at Detroit Mercy	W 80–71	16–15 (10–8)	Calihan Hall (1,963); Detroit, MI
Horizon League tournament
March 5, 2019; 7:00 pm, ESPN+	(5)	(4) Green Bay; Quarterfinals	L 77–82	16–16	Resch Center (1,727); Ashwaubenon, WI
*Non-conference game. ^{#}Rankings from AP Poll. (#) Tournament seedings in parentheses. All times are in Central Time.
