= 2018–19 DePaul Blue Demons men's basketball team =

American college basketball season

2018–19 DePaul Blue Demons men's basketball
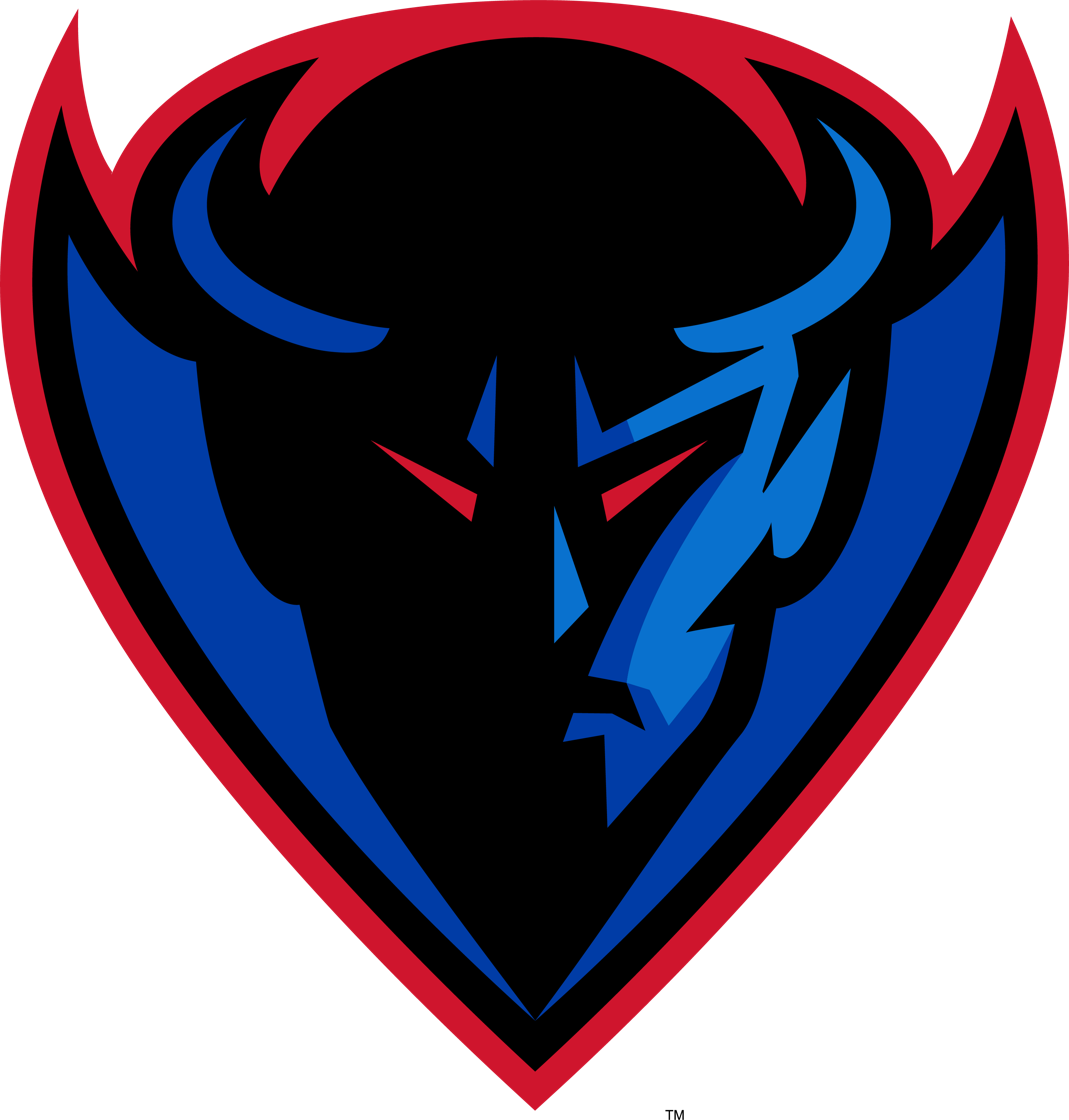

CBI, Runner-up
- Conference: Big East Conference
- Record: 19–17 (7–11 Big East)
- Head coach: Dave Leitao (4th straight, 7th overall season)
- Assistant coaches: Tim Anderson; Bill Courtney; Shane Heirman
- Home arena: Wintrust Arena; McGrath–Phillips Arena

2018–19 Big East men's basketball standings
	Conf.				Overall
Team	W		L	PCT	W		L	PCT
No. 23 Villanova †	13	–	5	.722	26	–	10	.722
Marquette	12	–	6	.667	24	–	10	.706
Seton Hall	9	–	9	.500	20	–	14	.588
Xavier	9	–	9	.500	19	–	16	.543
Creighton	9	–	9	.500	20	–	15	.571
Georgetown	9	–	9	.500	19	–	14	.576
St. John's	8	–	10	.444	21	–	13	.618
Providence	7	–	11	.389	18	–	16	.529
Butler	7	–	11	.389	16	–	17	.485
DePaul	7	–	11	.389	19	–	17	.528
† 2019 Big East tournament winner Rankings from AP Poll

The 2018–19 DePaul Blue Demons men's basketball team represented DePaul University during the 2018–19 NCAA Division I men's basketball season. They were led by fourth-year (seventh overall with DePaul) head coach Dave Leitao and played their home games at the Wintrust Arena in Chicago as members of the Big East Conference. They finished the season 19–17, 7–11 in Big East play to finish in a three-way tie for last place. As the No. 10 seed in the Big East tournament, they lost in the first round to St. John's. They received a bid to the College Basketball Invitational where they defeated Central Michigan, Longwood, and Coastal Carolina to advance to the championship series against South Florida. There, in a best-of-three series, they lost to South Florida two games to one.

== Previous season ==
The Blue Demons finished the 2017–18 season 11–20, 4–14 in Big East play to finish in a tie for ninth place. They lost in the first round of the Big East tournament to Marquette.

== Offseason ==
=== Departures ===
Name	Number	Pos.	Height	Weight	Year	Hometown	Reason for departure
Justin Roberts	0	G	6'0"	170	Freshman	Indianapolis, IN	Transferred to Georgia State
Austin Grandstaff	1	G	6'2"	185	RS Sophomore	Rockwall, TX	Transferred to Texas A&M–Commerce
Brandon Cyrus	4	G	6'5"	190	Sophomore	Toronto, ON	Transferred to UC Santa Barbara
Tre'Darius McCallum	10	F	6'7"	220	RS Senior	Myrtle Beach, SC	Graduated
Tobias Dwimaah	22	F	6'5"	220	Senior	Chicago, IL	Graduated
Peter Ryckbosch	30	F	6'10"	230	RS Senior	Chicago, IL	Graduated
Joe Hanel	33	F	6'7"	218	Senior	Savage, MN	Graduated
Marin Maric	34	C	6'11"	240	RS Senior	Split, Croatia	Graduated

=== Incoming transfers ===
Name	Number	Pos.	Height	Weight	Year	Hometown	Previous School
Lyrik Shreiner	0	G	6'3	190	Junior	Phoenix, AZ	Cal State Northridge
Darious Hall	13	F	6'6	210	Sophomore	Little Rock, AR	Arkansas
Femi Olujobi	25	F	6'8"	233	RS Senior	Long Island, NY	North Carolina A&T

=== 2018 recruiting class ===
College recruiting
Name	Hometown	School	Height	Weight	Commit date
John Diener; SG	Cedarburg, WI	Cedarburg High School	6 ft 4 in (1.93 m)	170 lb (77 kg)	May 4, 2016
John Diener; SG	Recruit ratings: Scout: Rivals: 247Sports: ESPN:				
George Maslennikov; PF	Ukraine	Holy Spirit Preparatory School	6 ft 9 in (2.06 m)	230 lb (100 kg)	May 4, 2016
George Maslennikov; PF	Recruit ratings: Scout: Rivals: 247Sports: ESPN:				
Overall recruit ranking:
Note: In many cases, Scout, Rivals, 247Sports, On3, and ESPN may conflict in their listings of height and weight.; In these cases, the average was taken. ESPN grades are on a 100-point scale.; Sources: "2018 DePaul Signees". Rivals.; "2018 DePaul Signees". ESPN.; "2018 Team Ranking". Rivals.

=== 2019 recruiting class ===
College recruiting (2018)
Name	Hometown	School	Height	Weight	Commit date
Romeo Weems; G/F	New Haven, MI	New Haven High School	6 ft 7 in (2.01 m)	215 lb (98 kg)	May 23, 2018
Romeo Weems; G/F	Recruit ratings: Scout: Rivals: 247Sports: (89)				
Overall recruit ranking:
Note: In many cases, Scout, Rivals, 247Sports, On3, and ESPN may conflict in their listings of height and weight.; In these cases, the average was taken. ESPN grades are on a 100-point scale.; Sources: "2019 DePaul Signees". Rivals.; "2019 DePaul Signees". ESPN.; "2019 Team Ranking". Rivals.

== Roster ==
2018–19 DePaul Blue Demons men's basketball team
Players
Coaches

Pos.	#	Name	Height	Weight	Year	Previous school	Hometown
G	0	Lyrik Shreiner	6 ft 3 in (1.91 m)	190 lb (86 kg)	RS Jr	Hillcrest Academy; TCU; CSUN	Phoenix, AZ
F	2	Jaylen Butz	6 ft 9 in (2.06 m)	224 lb (102 kg)	So	North Side	Fort Wayne, IN
G	3	Devin Gage	6 ft 2 in (1.88 m)	195 lb (88 kg)	RS So	Curie	Chicago, IL
F	4	Paul Reed	6 ft 9 in (2.06 m)	210 lb (95 kg)	So	Wekiva	Orlando, FL
G	5	Jalen Coleman-Lands	6 ft 3 in (1.91 m)	185 lb (84 kg)	RS Jr	La Lumiere School; Illinois	Indianapolis, IN
G	11	Eli Cain	6 ft 6 in (1.98 m)	200 lb (91 kg)	Sr	St. Benedict's Prep	Willingboro, NJ
G	12	Jason Malonga (W)	6 ft 4 in (1.93 m)	180 lb (82 kg)	So	Benet Academy	Bolingbrook, IL
F	13	Darious Hall (redshirt)	6 ft 7 in (2.01 m)	200 lb (91 kg)	So	Mills University Studies; Arkansas	Little Rock, AR
G	21	Flynn Cameron	6 ft 3 in (1.91 m)	198 lb (90 kg)	RS Fr	Hillcrest Christian College	Auckland, New Zealand
F	22	George Maslennikov	6 ft 10 in (2.08 m)	234 lb (106 kg)	Fr	Holy Spirit Prep	Odesa, Ukraine
F	23	Mick Sullivan (W)	6 ft 8 in (2.03 m)	241 lb (109 kg)	Fr	Marmion Academy	Aurora, IL
F	25	Femi Olujobi	6 ft 9 in (2.06 m)	258 lb (117 kg)	RS Sr	Brentwood; North Carolina A&T	Long Island, NY
G	31	Max Strus	6 ft 6 in (1.98 m)	205 lb (93 kg)	RS Sr	Amos Alonzo Stagg; Lewis University	Hickory Hills, IL
G	33	John Diener	6 ft 5 in (1.96 m)	203 lb (92 kg)	Fr	Cedarburg	Cedarburg, WI
G	35	Pantelis Xidias (W)	5 ft 10 in (1.78 m)	165 lb (75 kg)	So	La Lumiere	Michigan City, IN

Head coach

- Dave Leitao (Northeastern)

Assistant coach(es)

- Tim Anderson (Oklahoma Panhandle State)
- Bill Courtney (Bucknell)
- Shane Heirman (Tulsa)

Legend

- (C) Team captain
- (S) Suspended
- (I) Ineligible
- (W) Walk-on
- Injured
- Current redshirt

Roster

== Schedule and results ==
Date time, TV	Rank^{#}	Opponent^{#}	Result	Record	High points	High rebounds	High assists	Site (attendance) city, state
Exhibition
November 1, 2018*; 7:00 pm		Rockhurst	W 72–65	–	19 – Cain	11 – Reed	5 – Tied	Wintrust Arena (3,624); Chicago, IL
Non-conference regular season
November 7, 2018*; 6:30 pm, FS1		Bethune–Cookman	W 80–58	1–0	25 – Strus	8 – Reed	8 – Cain	Wintrust Arena (3,710); Chicago, IL
November 12, 2018*; 7:30 pm, FS1		Morgan State	W 91–63	2–0	25 – Strus	9 – Tied	9 – Gage	Wintrust Arena (3,664); Chicago, IL
November 15, 2018*; 8:00 pm, FS1		Penn State; Gavitt Tipoff Games	W 72–70 ^{OT}	3–0	21 – Strus	15 – Butz	6 – Cain	Wintrust Arena (3,926); Chicago, IL
November 24, 2018*; 11:00 am, ACCN Extra		at Notre Dame	L 70–95	3–1	15 – Strus	6 – Tied	4 – Cain	Edmund P. Joyce Center (6,751); South Bend, IN
November 28, 2018*; 7:00 pm, FS2		Cleveland State	W 83–73	4–1	26 – Cain	8 – Tied	7 – Strus	Wintrust Arena (3,741); Chicago, IL
December 3, 2018*; 7:30 pm, FS1		Florida A&M	W 65–50	5–1	16 – Olujobi	14 – Reed	4 – Cain	Wintrust Arena (3,763); Chicago, IL
December 8, 2018*; 11:00 am, BTN		at Northwestern	L 68–75	5–2	22 – Olujobi	9 – Strus	4 – Tied	Welsh-Ryan Arena (7,039); Evanston, IL
December 12, 2018*; 7:00 pm, FS1		Chicago State	W 104–70	6–2	27 – Strus	8 – Strus	11 – Cain	Wintrust Arena (3,729); Chicago, IL
December 14, 2018*; 6:00 pm, FS1		UIC	W 90–70	7–2	34 – Strus	13 – Strus	5 – Gage	Wintrust Arena (4,136); Chicago, IL
December 19, 2018*; 7:30 pm, FS2		Incarnate Word	W 81–71	8–2	20 – Cain	6 – Reed	6 – Gage	Wintrust Arena (3,705); Chicago, IL
December 22, 2018*; 2:30 pm, FS1		Boston College	L 62–65	8–3	16 – Strus	11 – Reed	4 – Tied	Wintrust Arena (4,741); Chicago, IL
Big East regular season
December 29, 2018; 1:00 pm, FS1		Xavier	L 65–74	8–4 (0–1)	17 – Reed	9 – Reed	3 – Shreiner	Wintrust Arena (5,632); Chicago, IL
January 2, 2019; 7:30 pm, FS1		at Villanova	L 68–73	8–5 (0–2)	16 – Tied	8 – Strus	5 – Gage	Finneran Pavilion (6,501); Villanova, PA
January 6, 2019; 12:00 pm, FS1		Seton Hall	W 75–74	9–5 (1–2)	21 – Strus	9 – Tied	6 – Gage	Wintrust Arena (4,068); Chicago, IL
January 12, 2019; 5:00 pm, CBSSN		at No. 24 St. John's	W 79–71	10–5 (2–2)	27 – Olujobi	12 – Strus	4 – Gage	Carnesecca Arena (5,602); Queens, NY
January 16, 2019; 8:30 pm, FS1		Butler	L 69–87	10–6 (2–3)	23 – Olujobi	12 – Reed	4 – Tied	Wintrust Arena (4,616); Chicago, IL
January 19, 2019; 7:00 pm, FS1		at Seton Hall	W 97–93	11–6 (3–3)	22 – Tied	14 – Reed	3 – Tied	Prudential Center (9,023); Newark, NJ
January 23, 2019; 7:30 pm, FS1		at No. 12 Marquette	L 69–79	11–7 (3–4)	18 – Reed	11 – Olujobi	5 – Tied	Fiserv Forum (14,283); Milwaukee, WI
January 27, 2019; 11:00 am, FS1		at Providence	L 67–70	11–8 (3–5)	20 – Reed	9 – Reed	5 – Gage	Dunkin' Donuts Center (12,009); Providence, RI
January 30, 2019; 7:00 pm, CBSSN		No. 14 Villanova	L 74–86	11–9 (3–6)	20 – Olujobi	8 – Olujobi	6 – Gage	Wintrust Arena (5,002); Chicago, IL
February 2, 2019; 1:30 pm, FS1		Providence	W 67–55	12–9 (4–6)	18 – Reed	15 – Reed	4 – Cain	Wintrust Arena (5,173); Chicago, IL
February 9, 2019; 7:00 pm, FS1		at Xavier	W 74–62	13–9 (5–6)	17 – Strus	9 – Olujobi	4 – Gage	Cintas Center (10,242); Cincinnati, OH
February 12, 2019; 7:30 pm, FSN		No. 10 Marquette	L 73–92	13–10 (5–7)	16 – Strus	11 – Reed	4 – Gage	Wintrust Arena (6,836); Chicago, IL
February 16, 2019; 7:00 pm, FS1		at Butler	L 78–91	13–11 (5–8)	23 – Strus	8 – Butz	4 – Cain	Hinkle Fieldhouse (9,100); Indianapolis, IN
February 20, 2019; 8:00 pm, FSN		Creighton	L 67–79	13–12 (5–9)	18 – Strus	8 – Strus	4 – Cain	Wintrust Arena (4,238); Chicago, IL
February 27, 2019; 6:05 pm, CBSSN		at Georgetown	L 73–82	13–13 (5–10)	25 – Strus	12 – Reed	5 – Gage	Capital One Arena (5,176); Washington, D.C.
March 3, 2019; 11:00 am, FS1		St. John's	W 92–83	14–13 (6–10)	43 – Strus	10 – Olujobi	5 – Cain	Wintrust Arena (5,376); Chicago, IL
March 6, 2019; 7:45 pm, FS1		Georgetown	W 101–69	15–13 (7–10)	30 – Strus	10 – Reed	10 – Gage	Wintrust Arena (4,756); Chicago, IL
March 9, 2019; 7:00 pm, FS1		at Creighton	L 78–91	15–14 (7–11)	19 – Tied	10 – Reed	10 – Gage	CHI Health Center Omaha (17,083); Omaha, NE
Big East tournament
March 13, 2019; 8:30 pm, FS1	(10)	vs. (7) St. John’s; First Round	L 74–82	15–15	23 – Cain	14 – Butz	5 – Butz	Madison Square Garden (19,812); New York City, NY
College Basketball Invitational
March 20, 2019*; 7:00 pm		Central Michigan; First round	W 100–86	16–15	33 – Strus	12 – Butz	7 – Cain	McGrath–Phillips Arena (1,173); Chicago, IL
March 25, 2019*; 7:00 pm, NBCSC+		Longwood; Quarterfinals	W 97–89	17–15	38 – Strus	12 – Reed	2 – Tied	McGrath–Phillips Arena (1,040); Chicago, IL
March 27, 2019*; 7:00 pm		Coastal Carolina; Semifinals	W 92–87	18–15	24 – Tied	8 – Olujobi	6 – Shreiner	McGrath–Phillips Arena (939); Chicago, IL
April 1, 2019*; 6:00 pm, ESPNU		at South Florida; Finals – Game 1	L 61–63	18–16	19 – Cain	12 – Reed	3 – Tied	Yuengling Center (2,375); Tampa, FL
April 3, 2019*; 7:00 pm, ESPNU		South Florida; Finals – Game 2	W 100–96 ^{OT}	19–16	32 – Strus	16 – Reed	7 – Shreiner	McGrath–Phillips Arena (1,704); Chicago, IL
April 5, 2019*; 6:00 pm, ESPNU		South Florida; Finals – Game 3	L 65–77	19–17	19 – Gage	10 – Olujobi	3 – Cameron	McGrath–Phillips Arena (1,876); Chicago, IL
*Non-conference game. ^{#}Rankings from AP Poll. (#) Tournament seedings in parentheses. All times are in Central Time.
