= 2018–19 Wright State Raiders men's basketball team =

American college basketball season

2018–19 Wright State Raiders men's basketball

Horizon League regular season co-champions

NIT, first round
- Conference: Horizon League
- Record: 21–14 (13–5 Horizon)
- Head coach: Scott Nagy (3rd season)
- Assistant coaches: Brian Cooley; Sharif Chambliss; Clint Sargent
- Home arena: Nutter Center

2018–19 Horizon League men's basketball standings
	Conf.				Overall
Team	W		L	PCT	W		L	PCT
Wright State	13	–	5	.722	21	–	14	.600
Northern Kentucky †	13	–	5	.722	26	–	9	.743
Oakland	11	–	7	.611	16	–	17	.485
Green Bay	10	–	8	.556	21	–	17	.553
UIC	10	–	8	.556	16	–	16	.500
Youngstown State	8	–	10	.444	12	–	20	.375
Detroit Mercy	8	–	10	.444	11	–	20	.355
IUPUI	8	–	10	.444	16	–	17	.485
Cleveland State	5	–	13	.278	10	–	21	.323
Milwaukee	4	–	14	.222	9	–	22	.290
† 2019 Horizon League tournament winner

The 2018–19 Wright State Raiders men's basketball team represented Wright State University during the 2018–19 NCAA Division I men's basketball season. The Raiders, led by third-year head coach Scott Nagy, played their home games at the Nutter Center in Fairborn, Ohio, as members of the Horizon League. They finished the season 21–14, 13–5 in Horizon League to be regular season co-champions with Northern Kentucky. They defeated IUPUI and Green Bay to advance to the championship game of the Horizon League tournament where they lost to Northern Kentucky. As regular season league champion, and number 1 seed in their league tournament, who failed to win their league tournament, they received an automatic bid to the National Invitation Tournament where they lost in the first round to Clemson.

== Previous season ==
The Raiders finished the 2017–18 season 25–10, 14–4 in Horizon League play to finish in second place. In the Horizon League tournament, they defeated Green Bay, Milwaukee, and Cleveland State to become Horizon League Tournament champions. This received the Horizon League's automatic bid to the NCAA tournament, where they lost to Tennessee in the first round.

== Roster ==
2018–19 Wright State Raiders men's basketball team
Players
Coaches

Pos.	#	Name	Height	Weight	Year	Previous school	Hometown
G	0	Jaylon Hall	6 ft 5 in (1.96 m)	190 lb (86 kg)	So	Doss HS	Houston, TX
F	1	Bill Wampler	6 ft 6 in (1.98 m)	220 lb (100 kg)	Jr	Regis, HS	Eau Claire, WI
G	3	Mark Hughes	6 ft 4 in (1.93 m)	205 lb (93 kg)	Sr	Ursuline HS	Youngstown, OH
G	4	Alan Vest	6 ft 3 in (1.91 m)	195 lb (88 kg)	Sr	Chaminade-Julienne HS	Kettering, OH
G	5	Skyelar Potter	6 ft 3 in (1.91 m)	200 lb (91 kg)	Fr	Bowling Green, KY
G	10	Adam Giles (W)	6 ft 3 in (1.91 m)	205 lb (93 kg)	Sr	Miamisburg HS	Miamisburg, OH
C	11	Loudon Love	6 ft 9 in (2.06 m)	280 lb (127 kg)	RS So	Geneva HS	Geneva, IL
G	13	Malachi Smith	6 ft 3 in (1.91 m)	195 lb (88 kg)	Fr	West HS	Belleville, IL
G	15	Jack Hendricks	5 ft 11 in (1.8 m)	170 lb (77 kg)	Fr	Fairmont HS	Kettering, OH
F	20	Andy Neff	6 ft 7 in (2.01 m)	210 lb (95 kg)	Fr	Oakwood HS	Oakwood, OH
F	21	Grant Basile	6 ft 8 in (2.03 m)	215 lb (98 kg)	Fr	Pewaukee HS	Pewaukee, WI
F/C	22	Parker Ernsthausen	6 ft 11 in (2.11 m)	240 lb (109 kg)	RS Sr	Toledo St. John's HS	Bowling Green, OH
F	23	James Manns	6 ft 7 in (2.01 m)	210 lb (95 kg)	RS Fr	Walnut Ridge HS	Columbus, OH
G	31	Cole Gentry	5 ft 10 in (1.78 m)	180 lb (82 kg)	RS Jr	St. Charles East HS	St. Charles, IL
F	33	Ryan Custer	6 ft 7 in (2.01 m)	235 lb (107 kg)	Jr	Elder HS	Cincinnati, OH

Head coach

- Scott Nagy (Delta State)

Assistant coach(es)

- Brian Cooley (Nebraska Wesleyan)
- Sharif Chambliss (Wisconsin)
- Clint Sargent (South Dakota State)

Legend

- (C) Team captain
- (S) Suspended
- (I) Ineligible
- (W) Walk-on
- Injured
- Current redshirt

Roster
Last update: November 7, 2018

== Schedule and results ==
Date time, TV	Rank^{#}	Opponent^{#}	Result	Record	Site (attendance) city, state
Exhibition
Oct 31, 2018*; 7:00 pm		Notre Dame College	W 86–51		Nutter Center; Fairborn, OH
Non-conference regular season
Nov 7, 2018*; 7:00 pm, ESPN+		Western Carolina; Cancún Challenge campus game	W 96–73	1–0	Nutter Center (3,292); Fairborn, OH
Nov 10, 2018*; 7:00 pm, ESPN+		at Murray State	L 54–73	1–1	CFSB Center (5,066); Murray, KY
Nov 14, 2018*; 7:00 pm, ESPN+		Toledo; Cancún Challenge campus game	W 84–74	2–1	Nutter Center (3,263); Fairborn, OH
Nov 17, 2018*; 3:00 pm, ESPN3		North Florida	W 89–72	3–1	Nutter Center (3,207); Fairborn, OH
Nov 20, 2018*; 8:30 pm, CBSSN		vs. Penn State; Cancún Challenge Riviera Division semifinals	L 59–77	3–2	Hard Rock Hotel Riviera Convention Center; Cancún, Mexico
Nov 21, 2018*; 6:00 pm, CBSSN		vs. SMU; Cancún Challenge Mayan Division consolation game	L 76–77	3–3	Hard Rock Hotel Riviera Convention Center; Cancún, Mexico
Nov 27, 2018*; 7:00 pm, ESPN+		Cedarville	W 58–39	4–3	Nutter Center (3,317); Fairborn, OH
Dec 1, 2018*; 2:00 pm, ESPN+		at Indiana State	L 63–69	4–4	Hulman Center (3,499); Terre Haute, IN
Dec 5, 2018*; 7:00 pm, ESPN3		Miami (OH)	L 62–65	4–5	Nutter Center (4,095); Fairborn, OH
Dec 8, 2018*; 4:00 pm, ESPN+		at Kent State	L 76–83	4–6	MAC Center; Kent, OH
Dec 13, 2018*; 7:00 pm, ESPN+		Northwestern Ohio	W 91–52	5–6	Nutter Center (3,169); Fairborn, OH
Dec 18, 2018*; 7:00 pm, ESPN+		Morehead State	W 78–67	6–6	Nutter Center (3,133); Fairborn, OH
Dec 22, 2018*; 7:00 pm, SECN		vs. No. 17 Mississippi State; Jackson Showcase	L 63–67	6–7	Mississippi Coliseum (3,021); Jackson, MS
Horizon League regular season
Dec 28, 2018; 7:00 pm, ESPN2		UIC	L 72–75 ^{OT}	6–8 (0–1)	Nutter Center (3,506); Fairborn, OH
Dec 30, 2018; 3:00 pm, ESPN3		IUPUI	W 72–64	7–8 (1–1)	Nutter Center (3,795); Fairborn, OH
Jan 3, 2019; 7:00 pm, ESPN+		at Detroit Mercy	L 58–79	7–9 (1–2)	Calihan Hall (1,243); Detroit, MI
Jan 5, 2019; 3:00 pm, ESPN+		at Oakland	W 89–73	8–9 (2–2)	Athletics Center O'rena (3,490); Auburn Hills, MI
Jan 11, 2019; 7:00 pm, ESPN2		at Northern Kentucky	L 64–68	8–10 (2–3)	BB&T Arena (5,848); Highland Heights, KY
Jan 17, 2019; 7:00 pm, ESPN+		at Youngstown State	W 80–74	9–10 (3–3)	Beeghly Center (1,598); Youngstown, OH
Jan 19, 2019; 7:00 pm, ESPN+		at Cleveland State	W 89–66	10–10 (4–3)	Wolstein Center (942); Cleveland, OH
Jan 24, 2019; 7:00 pm, ESPN+		Milwaukee	W 56–54	11–10 (5–3)	Nutter Center (3,469); Fairborn, OH
Jan 26, 2019; 7:00 pm, ESPN3		Green Bay	W 87–75	12–10 (6–3)	Nutter Center (6,112); Fairborn, OH
Feb 1, 2019; 9:00 pm, ESPNU		at UIC	L 53-67	12–11 (6–4)	Credit Union 1 Arena (2,156); Chicago, IL
Feb 3, 2019; 1:00 pm, ESPN+		at IUPUI	W 79–74	13–11 (7–4)	Indiana Farmers Coliseum (1,112); Indianapolis, IN
Feb 7, 2019; 7:00 pm, ESPN+		Oakland	W 76–62	14–11 (8–4)	Nutter Center (3,498); Fairborn, OH
Feb 9, 2019; 7:00 pm, ESPN+		Detroit Mercy	W 83–60	15–11 (9–4)	Nutter Center (5,045); Fairborn, OH
Feb 15, 2019; 9:00 pm, ESPNU		Northern Kentucky	W 81–77	16–11 (10–4)	Nutter Center (6,233); Fairborn, OH
Feb 21, 2019; 7:00 pm, ESPN+		Cleveland State	W 87–61	17–11 (11–4)	Nutter Center (4,655); Fairborn, OH
Feb 23, 2019; 3:00 pm, ESPN3		Youngstown State	W 82–54	18–11 (12–4)	Nutter Center (5,743); Fairborn, OH
Feb 28, 2019; 8:00 pm, ESPN+		at Green Bay	L 67–70	18–12 (12–5)	Resch Center (2,281); Ashwaubenon, WI
Mar 2, 2019; 7:00 pm, ESPN+		at Milwaukee	W 65–62	19–12 (13–5)	UW–Milwaukee Panther Arena (2,114); Milwaukee, WI
Horizon League tournament
March 5, 2019; 8:00 pm, ESPN+	(1)	(8) IUPUI; Quarterfinals	W 71–56	20–12	Nutter Center (4,936); Fairborn, OH
March 11, 2019; 7:00 pm, ESPNU	(1)	vs. (4) Green Bay; Semifinals	W 66–54	21–12	Little Caesars Arena; Detroit, MI
March 12, 2019; 7:00 pm, ESPN	(1)	vs. (2) Northern Kentucky; Championship	L 66–77	21–13	Little Caesars Arena; Detroit, MI
NIT
March 19, 2019*; 7:00 pm, ESPNU	(7)	at (2) Clemson; First round – Indiana bracket	L 69–75	21–14	Littlejohn Coliseum (1,718); Clemson, SC
*Non-conference game. ^{#}Rankings from AP Poll. (#) Tournament seedings in parentheses. All times are in Eastern Time.

== Awards and honors ==
Loudon Love	First Team All Horizon League
Bill Wampler	Second Team All Horizon League
Parker Ernsthausen	Horizon League All Defensive Team
Mark Hughes	Horizon League All Defensive Team
Malachi Smith	Horizon League All Newcomer Team
Scott Nagy	Horizon League Coach of the Year

== Statistics ==
Number	Name	Games	Average	Points	Assists	Rebounds
1	Bill Wampler	35	15.0	525	42	118
11	Loudon Love	34	15.1	513	32	280
31	Cole Gentry	35	11.7	411	113	86
3	Mark Hughes	35	9.3	324	101	149
5	Skyelar Potter	35	5.8	204	20	134
13	Malachi Smith	35	5.4	190	59	100
22	Parker Ernsthausen	35	4.9	173	81	108
4	Alan Vest	35	4.9	173	31	138
23	James Manns	16	1.9	31	1	5
20	Andy Neff	8	0.8	6	0	3
10	Adam Giles	14	0.4	5	2	4
21	Grant Basile	3	1.3	4	0	3
00	Jaylon Hall	1	2.0	2	2	2
