= 2018–19 Cleveland State Vikings men's basketball team =

American college basketball season

2018–19 Cleveland State Vikings men's basketball
- Conference: Horizon League
- Record: 10–21 (5–13 Horizon)
- Head coach: Dennis Felton (2nd season)
- Assistant coaches: Lou Dawkins; Bryan Tibaldi; Sam Ferry
- Home arena: Wolstein Center

2018–19 Horizon League men's basketball standings
	Conf.				Overall
Team	W		L	PCT	W		L	PCT
Wright State	13	–	5	.722	21	–	14	.600
Northern Kentucky †	13	–	5	.722	26	–	9	.743
Oakland	11	–	7	.611	16	–	17	.485
Green Bay	10	–	8	.556	21	–	17	.553
UIC	10	–	8	.556	16	–	16	.500
Youngstown State	8	–	10	.444	12	–	20	.375
Detroit Mercy	8	–	10	.444	11	–	20	.355
IUPUI	8	–	10	.444	16	–	17	.485
Cleveland State	5	–	13	.278	10	–	21	.323
Milwaukee	4	–	14	.222	9	–	22	.290
† 2019 Horizon League tournament winner

The 2018–19 Cleveland State Vikings men's basketball team represented Cleveland State University in the 2018–19 NCAA Division I men's basketball season. They were coached by second-year head coach Dennis Felton. The Vikings played their home games at the Wolstein Center as members of the Horizon League. They finished the season 10–21, 5–13 in Horizon League play to finish in eighth place. They failed to qualify for the Horizon League tournament.

On July 12, 2019, head coach Dennis Felton was fired. He finished at Cleveland State with a record of 22–44.

== Previous season ==
The Vikings finished the 2017–18 season 12–23, 6–12 in Horizon League play to finish in a tie for eighth place. As the No. 8 seed at the Horizon League tournament, they defeated Youngstown State and upset No. 1 seed Northern Kentucky and No. 4 seed Oakland to advance to the championship game where they lost to Wright State.

== Roster ==
2018–19 Cleveland State Vikings men's basketball team
Players
Coaches

Pos.	#	Name	Height	Weight	Year	Hometown
F	0	Rasheem Dunn	6 ft 2 in (1.88 m)	190 lb (86 kg)	Jr	Brooklyn, NY
G	1	Tyree Appleby	6 ft 1 in (1.85 m)	165 lb (75 kg)	So	Jacksonville, Arkansas
G	2	Kasheem Thomas	6 ft 0 in (1.83 m)	185 lb (84 kg)	Jr	Montreal, Quebec, Canada
G	3	Gregory Kolomoisky	6 ft 4 in (1.93 m)	210 lb (95 kg)	RS Fr	Geneva, Switzerland
G	4	Setric Millner Jr.	6 ft 6 in (1.98 m)	200 lb (91 kg)	Fr	Little Rock, Arkansas
G	5	Rashad Williams	6 ft 2 in (1.88 m)	180 lb (82 kg)	Fr	Detroit, Michigan
G	11	Dontel Highsmith	6 ft 2 in (1.88 m)	200 lb (91 kg)	Sr	Dowagiac, Michigan
F	12	Algebon Eichelberger	6 ft 8 in (2.03 m)	250 lb (113 kg)	So	Saginaw, Michigan
F	13	Stefan Kenić	6 ft 9 in (2.06 m)	230 lb (104 kg)	So	Belgrade, Serbia
F	22	Jaalam Hill	6 ft 7 in (2.01 m)	225 lb (102 kg)	Jr	Louisville, Kentucky
F	24	Dibaji Walker	6 ft 7 in (2.01 m)	190 lb (86 kg)	Fr	Columbus, Ohio
F	25	David Payne	6 ft 5 in (1.96 m)	215 lb (98 kg)	Sr	Chicago, Illinois
F	35	Deante Johnson	6 ft 9 in (2.06 m)	210 lb (95 kg)	Fr	Detroit, MI
F	44	Aleska Popovic	6 ft 9 in (2.06 m)	215 lb (98 kg)	Fr	Belgrade, Serbia

Head coach

- Dennis Felton (Howard)

Assistant coach(es)

- Lou Dawkins (Tulsa)
- Bryan Tibaldi (Michigan State)
- Sam Ferry (Vanderbilt)

Legend

- (C) Team captain
- (S) Suspended
- (I) Ineligible
- (W) Walk-on
- Injured
- Current redshirt

Roster
Last update: October 31, 2018

== Schedule and results ==
Date time, TV	Opponent	Result	Record	Site (attendance) city, state
Exhibition
Oct 30, 2018*; 7:00 pm	Ohio Valley	W 102–55		Wolstein Center; Cleveland, OH
Non-Conference regular season
Nov 6, 2018*; 7:00 pm, ESPN+	at Davidson	L 63–83	0–1	John M. Belk Arena (2,663); Davidson, NC
Nov 10, 2018*; 7:00 pm, ESPN3	Kent State; Northeast Ohio Coaches vs Cancer Doubleheader	L 79–83	0–2	Wolstein Center (2,052); Cleveland, OH
Nov 13, 2018*; 7:00 pm, ESPN+	Urbana	W 94–65	1–2	Wolstein Center (951); Cleveland, OH
Nov 16, 2018*; 7:00 pm, ESPN+	South Carolina State; Buckeye Basketball Classic	W 84–69	2–2	Wolstein Center (1,071); Cleveland, OH
Nov 18, 2018*; 5:00 pm, ESPN+	Samford; Buckeye Basketball Classic	L 60–73	2–3	Wolstein Center (818); Cleveland, OH
Nov 23, 2018*; 5:00 pm, FS1	at No. 23 Ohio State; Buckeye Basketball Classic	L 62–89	2–4	Value City Arena (13,276); Columbus, OH
Nov 25, 2018*; 5:00 pm, ESPN+	Purdue Fort Wayne; Buckeye Basketball Classic	L 79–82	2–5	Wolstein Center (777); Cleveland, OH
Nov 28, 2018*; 8:00 pm, FS2	at DePaul	L 73–83	2–6	Wintrust Arena (3,741); Chicago, IL
Dec 1, 2018*; 2:00 pm	at Toledo	L 67–80	2–7	Savage Arena (4,636); Toledo, OH
Dec 5, 2018*; 7:30 pm, ESPN+	Bowling Green	W 82–64	3–7	Wolstein Center (1,322); Cleveland, OH
Dec 9, 2018*; 1:00 pm, ESPN+	Notre Dame (OH)	W 77–56	4–7	Wolstein Center (724); Cleveland, OH
Dec 16, 2018*; 2:00 pm, ESPN+	at Illinois State	L 77–88 ^{OT}	4–8	Redbird Arena (4,225); Normal, IL
Dec 19, 2018*; 7:30 pm, ESPN3	Niagara	W 82–60	5–8	Wolstein Center (1,185); Cleveland, OH
Horizon League regular season
Dec 28, 2018; 7:00 pm, ESPN+	Oakland	L 77–89	5–9 (0–1)	Wolstein Center (1,043); Cleveland, OH
Dec 30, 2018; 7:00 pm, ESPN+	Detroit Mercy	L 61–73	5–10 (0–2)	Wolstein Center (885); Cleveland, OH
Jan 3, 2019; 8:00 pm, ESPN+	at Milwaukee	L 76–83	5–11 (0–3)	UW–Milwaukee Panther Arena (1,001); Milwaukee, WI
Jan 5, 2019; 1:00 pm, ESPN3	at Green Bay	L 89–90	5–12 (0–4)	Resch Center (2,470); Ashwaubenon, WI
Jan 10, 2019; 7:00 pm, ESPN3	at IUPUI	L 74–90	5–13 (0–5)	Indiana Farmers Coliseum (1,191); Indianapolis, IN
Jan 12, 2019; 4:00 pm, ESPN+	at UIC	L 56–73	5–14 (0–6)	Credit Union 1 Arena (56–73); Chicago, IL
Jan 17, 2019; 7:00 pm, ESPN+	Northern Kentucky	L 76–91	5–15 (0–7)	Wolstein Center (866); Cleveland, OH
Jan 19, 2019; 7:00 pm, ESPN+	Wright State	L 66–89	5–16 (0–8)	Wolstein Center (942); Cleveland, OH
Jan 26, 2019; 7:00 pm, ESPN+	Youngstown State	W 72–62	6–16 (1–8)	Wolstein Center (1,103); Cleveland, OH
Jan 31, 2019; 7:00 pm, ESPN+	at Detroit Mercy	L 64–78	6–17 (1–9)	Calihan Hall (1,805); Detroit, MI
Feb 2, 2019; 3:00 pm, ESPN3	at Oakland	L 68–83	6–18 (1–10)	Athletics Center O'rena (3,705); Auburn Hills, MI
Feb 7, 2019; 7:00 pm, ESPN+	Green Bay	L 65–82	6–19 (1–11)	Wolstein Center (1,144); Cleveland, OH
Feb 9, 2019; 3:00 pm, ESPN+	Milwaukee	W 78–68	7–19 (2–11)	Wolstein Center (1,708); Cleveland, OH
Feb 14, 2019; 7:00 pm, ESPN+	UIC	L 77–81	7–20 (2–12)	Wolstein Center (798); Cleveland, OH
Feb 16, 2019; 3:00 pm, ESPN+	IUPUI	W 89–86	8–20 (3–12)	Wolstein Center (1,567); Cleveland, OH
Feb 21, 2019; 7:00 pm, ESPN+	at Wright State	L 61–87	8–21 (3–13)	Nutter Center (4,655); Fairborn, OH
Feb 23, 2019; 7:00 pm, ESPN3	at Northern Kentucky	W 83–77	9–21 (4–13)	BB&T Arena (5,047); Highland Heights, KY
Mar 2, 2019; 7:00 pm, ESPN3	at Youngstown State	W 89–80 ^{OT}	10–21 (5–13)	Beeghly Center (4,011); Youngstown, OH
*Non-conference game. ^{#}Rankings from AP Poll. (#) Tournament seedings in parentheses. All times are in Eastern Time.
