= 2018–19 Oakland Golden Grizzlies men's basketball team =

American college basketball season

2018–19 Oakland Golden Grizzlies men's basketball
- Conference: Horizon League
- Record: 16–17 (11–7 Horizon)
- Head coach: Greg Kampe (35th season)
- Associate head coach: Dan Hipsher
- Assistant coaches: Tony Jones; Mychal Covington
- Home arena: Athletics Center O'rena

2018–19 Horizon League men's basketball standings
	Conf.				Overall
Team	W		L	PCT	W		L	PCT
Wright State	13	–	5	.722	21	–	14	.600
Northern Kentucky †	13	–	5	.722	26	–	9	.743
Oakland	11	–	7	.611	16	–	17	.485
Green Bay	10	–	8	.556	21	–	17	.553
UIC	10	–	8	.556	16	–	16	.500
Youngstown State	8	–	10	.444	12	–	20	.375
Detroit Mercy	8	–	10	.444	11	–	20	.355
IUPUI	8	–	10	.444	16	–	17	.485
Cleveland State	5	–	13	.278	10	–	21	.323
Milwaukee	4	–	14	.222	9	–	22	.290
† 2019 Horizon League tournament winner

The 2018–19 Oakland Golden Grizzlies men's basketball team represented Oakland University during the 2018–19 NCAA Division I men's basketball season. The Golden Grizzlies, led by 35th-year head coach Greg Kampe, played their home games at the Athletics Center O'rena in Auburn Hills, Michigan as members of the Horizon League. They finished the season 16–17, 11–7 in Horizon League play to finish in third place. They defeated Youngstown State in the quarterfinals of the Horizon League tournament before losing in the semifinals to Northern Kentucky.

== Previous season ==
The Golden Grizzlies finished the 2017–18 season 19–14, 10–8 in Horizon League play to finish in fourth place. They defeated IUPUI in the quarterfinals of the Horizon League tournament before losing in the semifinals to Cleveland State.

== Roster ==
2018–19 Oakland Golden Grizzlies men's basketball team
Players
Coaches

Pos.	#	Name	Height	Weight	Year	Previous school	Hometown
G	1	Braden Norris	5 ft 11 in (1.8 m)	180 lb (82 kg)	Fr	Hilliard Bradley HS	Hilliard, Ohio
G	2	Tray Maddox, Jr.	6 ft 5 in (1.96 m)	190 lb (86 kg)	Fr	Novi HS	Novi, Michigan
F	4	Stan Scott	6 ft 3 in (1.91 m)	180 lb (82 kg)	So	Williamsport HS	Williamsport, Pennsylvania
G	10	Karmari Newman	6 ft 4 in (1.93 m)	170 lb (77 kg)	RS So	George Mason	Detroit, Michigan
G	11	Brailen Neely	5 ft 9 in (1.75 m)	154 lb (70 kg)	Jr	Western HS	Detroit, Michigan
C	13	Brad Brechting	6 ft 11 in (2.11 m)	217 lb (98 kg)	RS Jr	Cedar Springs HS	Cedar Springs, Michigan
F	14	Xavier Hill-Mais	6 ft 7 in (2.01 m)	248 lb (112 kg)	RS Jr	Page HS	Greensboro, North Carolina
F	15	Jordan Nobles	6 ft 9 in (2.06 m)	195 lb (88 kg)	Sr	Eastern Michigan	Canton, Michigan
C	20	Babatunde Sowunmi	6 ft 10 in (2.08 m)	245 lb (111 kg)	Fr	Solid Rock Academy	Fayetteville, Georgia
G	21	Jaevin Cumberland	6 ft 2 in (1.88 m)	179 lb (81 kg)	RS Jr	Wilmington HS	Wilmington, Ohio
G	22	James Beck	6 ft 8 in (2.03 m)	210 lb (95 kg)	So	Grand Rapids Christian HS	Grand Rapids, Michigan
G	24	Kenny Pittman, Jr.	6 ft 3 in (1.91 m)	180 lb (82 kg)	Fr	Simeon Career Academy	Chicago, Illinois

Head coach

- Greg Kampe

Assistant coach(es)

- Dan Hipsher
- Tony Jones
- Mychal Covington

Legend

- (C) Team captain
- (S) Suspended
- (I) Ineligible
- (W) Walk-on
- Injured
- Current redshirt

Roster
Last update: November 2, 2018

== Schedule and results ==
Date time, TV	Rank^{#}	Opponent^{#}	Result	Record	Site (attendance) city, state
Exhibition
Oct 24, 2018*; 7:00 pm, ESPN+		Hillsdale	W 67–61		Athletics Center O'rena (1,682); Auburn Hills, MI
Nov 6, 2018*; 7:00 pm, ESPN+		Kalamazoo	W 99–45		Athletics Center O'rena (1,856); Auburn Hills, MI
Non-conference regular season
Nov 9, 2018*; 7:00 pm, ESPN3		Toledo	L 86–87	0–1	Athletics Center O'rena (3,841); Auburn Hills, MI
Nov 13, 2018*; 7:00 pm, ESPN+		Western Michigan	L 77–85 ^{OT}	0–2	Athletics Center O'rena (2,897); Auburn Hills, MI
Nov 16, 2018*; 10:00 pm, MWN		at UNLV	L 61–74	0–3	Thomas & Mack Center (7,439); Paradise, NV
Nov 19, 2018*; 7:00 pm, ESPN+		Defiance; Men Against Breast Cancer Oakland Hoops Challenge	W 91–47	1–3	Athletics Center O'rena (1,888); Auburn Hills, MI
Nov 23, 2018*; 2:30 pm, ESPN3		James Madison; Men Against Breast Cancer Oakland Hoops Challenge	W 77–69	2–3	Athletics Center O'rena (1,821); Auburn Hills, MI
Nov 24, 2018*; 2:30 pm, ESPN3		Oral Roberts; Men Against Breast Cancer Oakland Hoops Challenge	W 87–76	3–3	Athletics Center O'rena (1,610); Auburn Hills, MI
Nov 25, 2018*; 2:30 pm, TV20/ESPN+		Northern Illinois; Men Against Breast Cancer Oakland Hoops Challenge	L 72–92	3–4	Athletics Center O'rena (2,093); Auburn Hills, MI
Dec 1, 2018*; Noon, FS1		at Xavier	L 63–73	3–5	Cintas Center (10,331); Cincinnati, OH
Dec 6, 2018*; 7:00 pm, ESPN3		at Fairfield	W 87–86	4–5	Alumni Hall (1,871); Fairfield, CT
Dec 8, 2018*; 4:00 pm, NESN		at Northeastern	L 83–92	4–6	Matthews Arena (763); Boston, MA
Dec 16, 2018*; 4:30 pm		at Hartford	L 82–87	4–7	Chase Arena (1,179); West Hartford, CT
Dec 18, 2018*; 7:00 pm, SECN+		at Georgia	L 69–81	4–8	Stegeman Coliseum (7,518); Athens, GA
Dec 21, 2018*; 7:00 pm, BTN		at No. 10 Michigan State	L 69–99	4–9	Breslin Center (14,797); East Lansing, MI
Horizon League regular season
Dec 28, 2018; 7:00 pm, ESPN+		at Cleveland State	W 89–77	5–9 (1–0)	Wolstein Center (1,043); Cleveland, OH
Dec 30, 2018; 2:00 pm, ESPN3		at Youngstown State	W 76–74	6–9 (2–0)	Beeghly Center (2,804); Youngstown, OH
Jan 3, 2019; 7:00 pm, ESPN+		Northern Kentucky	W 76–74	7–9 (3–0)	Athletics Center O'rena (3,281); Auburn Hills, MI
Jan 5, 2019; 3:00 pm, ESPN+		Wright State	L 73–89	7–10 (3–1)	Athletics Center O'rena (3,490); Auburn Hills, MI
Jan 10, 2019; 7:00 pm, ESPN+		Milwaukee	L 64–67	7–11 (3–2)	Athletics Center O'rena (2,752); Auburn Hills, MI
Jan 12, 2019; 3:00 pm, ESPN+		Green Bay	W 90–78	8–11 (4–2)	Athletics Center O'rena (3,789); Auburn Hills, MI
Jan 19, 2019; 2:00 pm, ESPN+		at Detroit Mercy	W 79–73	9–11 (5–2)	Calihan Hall (4,125); Detroit, MI
Jan 24, 2019; 11:00 am, ESPN+		at IUPUI	L 71–73	9–12 (5–3)	Indiana Farmers Coliseum (2,285); Indianapolis, IN
Jan 26, 2019; 4:15 pm, ESPN3		at UIC	W 80–67	10–12 (6–3)	Credit Union 1 Arena (3,060); Chicago, IL
Jan 31, 2019; 7:00 pm, ESPN3		Youngstown State	L 74–75	10–13 (6–4)	Athletics Center O'rena (2,371); Auburn Hills, MI
Feb 2, 2019; 3:00 pm, ESPN+		Cleveland State	W 83–68	11–13 (7–4)	Athletics Center O'rena (3,705); Auburn Hills, MI
Feb 7, 2019; 7:00 pm, ESPN+		at Wright State	L 62–76	11–14 (7–5)	Nutter Center (3,498); Fairborn, OH
Feb 9, 2019; 7:00 pm, ESPN3		at Northern Kentucky	L 64–79	11–15 (7–6)	BB&T Arena (6,792); Highland Heights, KY
Feb 14, 2019; 8:00 pm, ESPN+		at Green Bay	L 54–66	11–16 (7–7)	Resch Center (2,239); Ashwaubenon, WI
Feb 16, 2019; 7:00 pm, ESPN3		at Milwaukee	W 89–73	12–16 (8–7)	UW–Milwaukee Panther Arena (2,440); Milwaukee, WI
Feb 23, 2019; 3:00 pm, ESPN3		Detroit Mercy	W 95–75	13–16 (9–7)	Athletics Center O'rena (4,141); Auburn Hills, MI
Feb 28, 2019; 7:00 pm, ESPN+		UIC	W 86–72	14–16 (10–7)	Athletics Center O'rena (3,512); Auburn Hills, MI
Mar 2, 2019; 4:00 pm, ESPN3		IUPUI	W 74–63	15–16 (11–7)	Athletics Center O'rena (3,699); Auburn Hills, MI
Horizon League tournament
March 6, 2019; 7:00 pm, ESPN+	(3)	(6) Youngstown State; Quarterfinals	W 88–84	16–16	Athletics Center O'rena (3,386); Auburn Hills, MI
March 11, 2019; 9:30 pm, ESPNU	(3)	vs. (2) Northern Kentucky; Semifinals	L 63–64	16–17	Little Caesars Arena; Detroit, MI
*Non-conference game. ^{#}Rankings from AP Poll. (#) Tournament seedings in parentheses. All times are in Eastern Time.
