= Naz Bohannon =

American basketball player (born 1999)

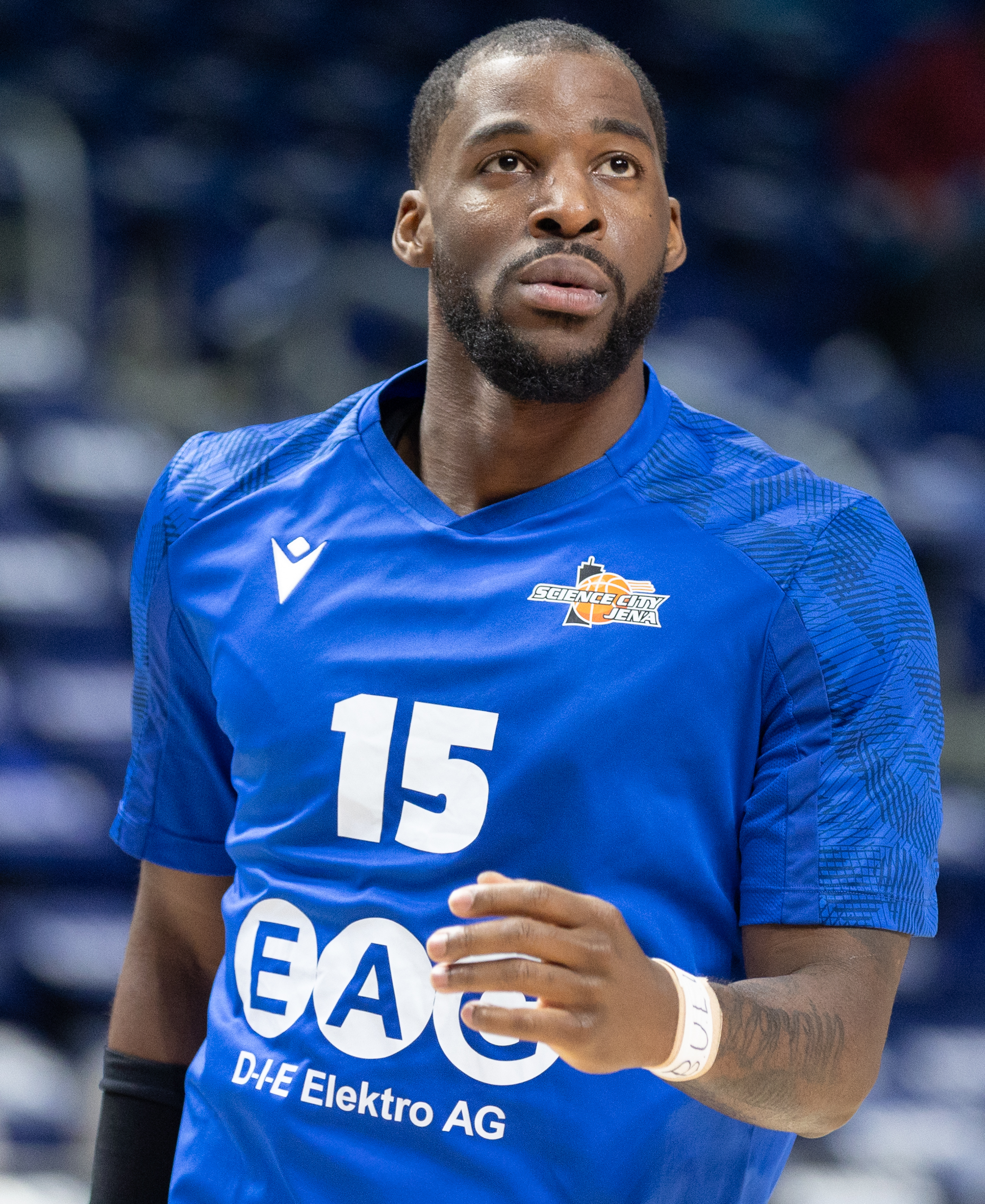
- Bohannon with Science City Jena in 2025

No. 32 – Artland Dragons
- Position: Power forward
- League: ProA

Personal information
- Born: 22 January 1999 (age 27) Lorain, Ohio, U.S.
- Listed height: 6 ft 6 in (1.98 m)
- Listed weight: 230 lb (104 kg)

Career information
- High school: Lorain (Lorain, Ohio)
- College: Youngstown State (2017–2021); Clemson (2021–2022)
- NBA draft: 2022: undrafted
- Playing career: 2023–present

Career history
- 2023: Rasta Vechta
- 2023–2025: Phoenix Hagen
- 2025–2026: Science City Jena
- 2026–present: Artland Dragons

Nazihar Deonte Bohannon (born 22 January 1999) is an American professional basketball player for the Artland Dragons of the German ProA. He played college basketball for Youngstown State and Clemson. Bohannon is a 1.98 m (6' 6") power forward.

== Early life ==
Naz Bohannon is originally from Ohio.

== Professional career ==
After he failed to make it to the roster of the Jacksonville Jaguars he signed in February 2023 with Rasta Vechta for the rest of the season.

In July 2023, Bohannon signed with Phoenix Hagen of the German ProA league.

On June 27, 2025, he signed with Science City Jena of the German Basketball Bundesliga.

On September 14, 2026, he signed with Artland Dragons of the German ProA.

== Player profile ==
Phoenix Hagen head coach Chris Harris raved about his new player: “..strengths are above all his physicality, but also his qualities as a "leader and his great character" Further, Harris stated that Bohannon "..is a great finisher around the basket.”

== Miscellaneous ==
Bohannon had played American football and baseball as well as basketball at high school, had been active in the NCAA college league for five years and was on the verge of signing a professional contract in American football before deciding to play basketball.
