= List of Buffalo Bulls men's basketball seasons =

This is a list of the seasons completed by the Buffalo Bulls men's basketball program.

== Season-by-season results ==
Statistics overview
Season	Coach	Overall	Conference	Standing	Postseason
Dreher (1905–1906)
1905–06 (Note: The 1915–16 season is considered by the University at Buffalo to be the first "official" season of the basketball team. The wins and losses from the seasons before 1915–16 are therefore not counted in the total win–loss record below.)	Dreher	1–3	—	—	—
Alfred Heerdt (1906–1907)
1906–07	Alfred Heerdt	6–2	—	—	—
Edward G. Froeber (1913–1914)
1913–14	Edward G. Froeber	2–4	—	—	—
Mike Maher (1914–1915)
1914–15	Mike Maher	0–5	—	—	—
Art Powell (1915–1943)
1915–16	Art Powell	7–4	—	—	—
1916–17	Art Powell	6–8	—	—	—
1917–18	Art Powell	6–2	—	—	—
1918–19	Art Powell	8–5	—	—	—
1919–20	Art Powell	9–1	—	—	—
1920–21	Art Powell	12–6	—	—	—
1921–22	Art Powell	5–7	—	—	—
1922–23	Art Powell	7–5	—	—	—
1923–24	Art Powell	7–6	—	—	—
1924–25	Art Powell	7–6	—	—	—
1925–26	Art Powell	11–6	—	—	—
1926–27	Art Powell	11–4	—	—	—
1927–28	Art Powell	8–8	—	—	—
1928–29	Art Powell	7–11	—	—	—
1929–30	Art Powell	15–1	—	—	—
1930–31	Art Powell	15–0	—	—	—
1931–32	Art Powell	15–4	—	—	—
1932–33	Art Powell	10–9	—	—	—
1933–34	Art Powell	5–10	—	—	—
1934–35	Art Powell	3–9	—	—	—
1935–36	Art Powell	0–13	—	—	—
1936–37	Art Powell	4–10	—	—	—
1937–38	Art Powell	4–9	—	—	—
1938–39	Art Powell	2–12	—	—	—
1939–40	Art Powell	1–10	—	—	—
1940–41	Art Powell	4–9	—	—	—
1941–42	Art Powell	2–8	—	—	—
1942–43	Art Powell	7–6	—	—	—
Art Powell:		198–190 (.510)	—		
Robert Harrington (1945–1946)
1945–46	Robert Harrington	5–10	—	—	—
Malcolm S. Eiken (1946–1956)
1946–47	Malcolm Eiken	12–5	—	—	—
1947–48	Malcolm Eiken	13–8	—	—	—
1948–49	Malcolm Eiken	11–9	—	—	—
1949–50	Malcolm Eiken	15–10	—	—	—
1950–51	Malcolm Eiken	13–8	—	—	—
1951–52	Malcolm Eiken	18–6	—	—	—
1952–53	Malcolm Eiken	10–9	—	—	—
1953–54	Malcolm Eiken	15–8	—	—	—
1954–55	Malcolm Eiken	16–6	—	—	—
1955–56	Malcolm Eiken	17–3	—	—	—
Malcolm S. Eiken:		140–72 (.660)	—		
Len T. Serfustini (1956–1970)
1956–57	Len Serfustini	18–7	—	—	NCAA College Division Elite Eight
1957–58	Len Serfustini	17–5	—	—	NCAA College Division first round
1958–59	Len Serfustini	16–7	—	—	NCAA College Division first round
1959–60	Len Serfustini	15–6	—	—	NCAA College Division first round
1960–61	Len Serfustini	18–5	—	—	—
1961–62	Len Serfustini	14–7	—	—	—
1962–63	Len Serfustini	16–7	—	—	NCAA College Division first round
1963–64	Len Serfustini	14–8	—	—	—
1964–65	Len Serfustini	19–3	—	—	NCAA College Division second round
1965–66	Len Serfustini	14–8	—	—	—
1966–67	Len Serfustini	9–11	—	—	—
1967–68	Len Serfustini	11–10	—	—	—
1968–69	Len Serfustini	12–9	—	—	—
1969–70	Len Serfustini	11–11	—	—	—
Len T. Serfustini:		204–104 (.662)	—		
Edwin D. Muto (1970–1973)
1970–71	Edwin Muto	9–13	—	—	—
1971–72	Edwin Muto	12–12	—	—	—
1972–73	Edwin Muto	16–8	—	—	—
Edwin D. Muto:		37–33 (.529)	—		
Leo Richardson (1973–1977)
1973–74	Leo Richardson	5–20	—	—	—
1974–75	Leo Richardson	8–17	—	—	—
1975–76	Leo Richardson	10–16	—	—	—
1976–77	Leo Richardson	5–21	—	—	—
Leo Richardson:		28–74 (.275)	—		
V. William Hughes (State University of New York Athletic Conference) (1978–1988)
1978–79	V. William Hughes	7–18	7–4	—	—
1979–80	V. William Hughes	17–10	10–0	—	—
1980–81	V. William Hughes	12–15	7–1	—	—
1981–82	V. William Hughes	13–17	8–3	—	NCAA Division III first round
V. William Hughes:		49–60 (.450)	32–8 (.800)		
Kenneth Pope (State University of New York Athletic Conference) (1982–1983)
1982–83	Kenneth Pope	12–15	6–4	—	—
Daniel J. Bazzani (State University of New York Athletic Conference) (1983–1988)
1983–84	Daniel Bazzani	14–13	5–5	—	—
1984–85	Daniel Bazzani	5–19	5–5	—	—
1985–86	Daniel Bazzani	14–11	5–5	—	—
1986–87	Daniel Bazzani	15–10	5–5	—	—
1987–88	Daniel Bazzani	14–13	6–6	—	—
Daniel J. Bazzani (Mideast Conference) (1988–1991)
1988–89	Daniel Bazzani	16–14	4–8	—	—
1989–90	Daniel Bazzani	14–13	4–8	—	—
1990–91	Daniel Bazzani	13–14	4–6	—	—
Daniel J. Bazzani (East Coast Conference) (1991–1992)
1991–92	Daniel Bazzani	2–26	0–12	7th	—
Daniel J. Bazzani (NCAA D-I independent) (1992–1993)
1992–93	Daniel Bazzani	5–22	—	—	—
Daniel J. Bazzani:		112–155 (.419)	38–60 (.388)		
Tim Cohane (East Coast Conference) (1993–1994)
1993–94	Tim Cohane	10–18	3–2	3rd	—
Tim Cohane (Mid-Continent Conference) (1994–1998)
1994–95	Tim Cohane	18–10	12–6	3rd	—
1995–96	Tim Cohane	13–14	10–8	4th	—
1996–97	Tim Cohane	17–11	11–5	2nd	—
1997–98	Tim Cohane	15–13	9–7	5th	—
Tim Cohane (Mid-American Conference) (1998–1999)
1998–99	Tim Cohane	5–24	1–17	7th (East)	—
Tim Cohane / Reggie Witherspoon (Mid-American Conference) (1999–2000)
1999–2000	Tim Cohane (2–3); Reggie Witherspoon (3–20)	5–23	3–15	7th (East)	—
Tim Cohane:		80–93 (.462)	46–45 (.505)		
Reggie Witherspoon (Mid-American Conference) (2000–2013)
2000–01	Reggie Witherspoon	4–24	2–16	7th (East)	—
2001–02	Reggie Witherspoon	12–18	7–11	6th (East)	—
2002–03	Reggie Witherspoon	5–23	2–16	6th (East)	—
2003–04	Reggie Witherspoon	17–12	11–7	3rd (East)	—
2004–05	Reggie Witherspoon	23–10	11–7	T-2nd (East)	NIT first round
2005–06	Reggie Witherspoon	19–13	8–10	5th (East)	—
2006–07	Reggie Witherspoon	12–19	4–12	5th (East)	—
2007–08	Reggie Witherspoon	10–20	3–13	6th (East)	—
2008–09	Reggie Witherspoon	21–12	11–5	T-1st (East)	CBI first round
2009–10	Reggie Witherspoon	18–12	9–7	T-3rd (East)	—
2010–11	Reggie Witherspoon	20–14	8–8	T-5th (East)	CIT quarterfinals
2011–12	Reggie Witherspoon	20–11	12–4	2nd (East)	CIT second round
2012–13	Reggie Witherspoon	14–20	7–9	T-4th (East)	—
Reggie Witherspoon:		198–228 (.465)	96–142 (.403)		
Bobby Hurley (Mid-American Conference) (2013–2015)
2013–14	Bobby Hurley	19–10	13–5	1st (East)	—
2014–15	Bobby Hurley	23–10	12–6	T-1st (East)	NCAA Division I Round of 64
Bobby Hurley:		42–20 (.677)	25–11 (.694)		
Nate Oats (Mid-American Conference) (2015–2019)
2015–16	Nate Oats	20–15	10–8	T-3rd (East)	NCAA Division I Round of 64
2016–17	Nate Oats	17–15	11–7	3rd (East)	—
2017–18	Nate Oats	27–9	15–3	1st (East)	NCAA Division I Round of 32
2018–19	Nate Oats	32–4	16–2	1st (East)	NCAA Division I Round of 32
Nate Oats:		96–43 (.691)	52–20 (.722)		
Jim Whitesell (Mid-American Conference) (2019–2023)
2019–20	Jim Whitesell	20–12	11–7	3rd (East)	—
2020–21	Jim Whitesell	16–9	12–5	2nd	NIT first round
2021–22	Jim Whitesell	19–11	13–6	5th	—
2022–23	Jim Whitesell	15–17	9–9	T-6th	—
Jim Whitesell:		70–49 (.588)	45–27 (.625)		
George Halcovage (Mid-American Conference) (2023–2025)
2023–24	George Halcovage	4–27	2–16	12th	—
2024–25	George Halcovage	9–22	4–14	11th	—
2025–26	George Halcovage	17–15	7–11	T–7th	—
George Halcovage:		30–64 (.319)	13–41 (.241)		
Total:		1,301–1,210 (.518)			
National champion Postseason invitational champion Conference regular season champion Conference regular season and conference tournament champion Division regular season champion Division regular season and conference tournament champion Conference tournament champion
