= Buffalo Bulls men's basketball statistical leaders =

The Buffalo Bulls men's basketball statistical leaders are individual statistical leaders of the Buffalo Bulls men's basketball program in various categories, including points, rebounds, assists, steals, and blocks. Within those areas, the lists identify single-game, single-season, and career leaders. The Bulls represent the University at Buffalo in the NCAA's Mid-American Conference.

Buffalo began competing in intercollegiate basketball in 1915. However, the school's record book does not generally list records from before the 1950s, as records from before this period are often incomplete and inconsistent. Since scoring was much lower in this era, and teams played much fewer games during a typical season, it is likely that few or no players from this era would appear on these lists anyway.

The NCAA did not officially record assists as a stat until the 1983–84 season, and blocks and steals until the 1985–86 season, but Buffalo's record books includes players in these stats before these seasons. These lists are updated through the end of the 2020–21 season.

== Scoring ==
Career
Rk	Player	Points	Seasons
1	Javon McCrea	2,004	2010–11 2011–12 2012–13 2013–14
2	CJ Massinburg	1,990	2015–16 2016–17 2017–18 2018–19
3	Rasaun Young	1,908	1993–94 1994–95 1996–97 1997–98
4	Jim Horne	1,833	1951–52 1952–53 1953–54 1954–55
5	Nick Perkins	1,772	2015–16 2016–17 2017–18 2018–19
6	Mike Martinho	1,708	1994–95 1995–96 1996–97 1997–98
7	Yassin Idbihi	1,514	2003–04 2004–05 2005–06 2006–07
8	Jeenathan Williams	1,478	2018–19 2019–20 2020–21 2021–22
9	Jayvon Graves	1,436	2017–18 2018–19 2019–20 2020–21
10	Turner Battle	1,414	2001–02 2002–03 2003–04 2004–05

Season
Rk	Player	Points	Season
1	CJ Massinburg	636	2018–19
2	Javon McCrea	611	2012–13
	CJ Massinburg	611	2017–18
4	Ryan Sabol	603	2025–26
5	Calvin Cage	592	2005–06
6	John Blalock	590	1991–92
7	Nick Perkins	584	2017–18
8	Justin Moss	579	2014–15
9	Sy Chatman	563	2023–24
10	Blake Hamilton	559	2016–17

Single game
Rk	Player	Points	Season	Opponent
1	Mike Martinho	44	1997–98	Rochester
2	CJ Massinburg	43	2018–19	West Virginia
3	Jim Horne	41	1954–55	Rochester
4	Darryl Hall	39	1987–88	Saint Anselm
	Rasaun Young	39	1996–97	Northeastern Illinois
6	Otis Horne	38	1974–75	Catholic
7	Calvin Cage	37	2005–06	Kent State
	Curtis Blackmore	37	1972–73	Chattanooga
	Jack Chalmers	37	1950–51	Hobart
	Mike Martinho	37	1995–96	Troy State

== Rebounds ==
Career
Rk	Player	Rebounds	Seasons
1	Sam Pellom	1,297	1974–75 1975–76 1976–77 1977–78
2	Curtis Blackmore	1,175	1970–71 1971–72 1972–73
3	Javon McCrea	988	2010–11 2011–12 2012–13 2013–14
4	Nick Perkins	848	2015–16 2016–17 2017–18 2018–19
5	Yassin Idbihi	844	2003–04 2004–05 2005–06 2006–07
6	Josh Mballa	785	2019–20 2020–21 2021–22
7	CJ Massinburg	769	2015–16 2016–17 2017–18 2018–19

Season
Rk	Player	Rebounds	Season
1	Curtis Blackmore	427	1972–73
2	Sam Pellom	420	1975–76
3	Curtis Blackmore	403	1971–72
4	Jim Horne	366	1954–55
5	Sam Pellom	311	1977–78
6	Josh Mballa	308	2019–20
7	Justin Moss	303	2014–15
8	Javon McCrea	286	2013–14
9	Sam Pellom	275	1974–75
10	Sam Pellom	273	1976–77

Single game
Rk	Player	Rebounds	Season	Opponent
1	Curtis Blackmore	32	1972–73	Chattanooga
2	Sam Pellom	31	1975–76	VCU
3	Curtis Blackmore	29	1970–71	Stony Brook
4	Sam Pellom	28	1975–76	Army
5	Sam Pellom	26	1974–75	Rochester
	Curtis Blackmore	26	1971–72	Georgia State
7	Sam Pellom	24	1977–78	Temple
8	Yassin Idbihi	20	2006–07	Bowling Green
	Sam Pellom	20	1976–77	Le Moyne
	Curtis Blackmore	20	1970–71	
	Javon McCrea	20	2013–14	Central Michigan
	Josh Mballa	20	2020–21	Akron

== Assists ==
Career
Rk	Player	Assists	Seasons
1	Gary Domzalski	565	1972–73 1973–74 1974–75 1975–76
2	Davonta Jordan	522	2016–17 2017–18 2018–19 2019–20
3	Michael Washington	518	1986–87 1987–88 1988–89
4	Turner Battle	458	2001–02 2002–03 2003–04 2004–05
5	Jarod Oldham	409	2010–11 2011–12 2012–13 2013–14

Season
Rk	Player	Assists	Season
1	Gary Domzalski	235	1974–75
2	Michael Washington	200	1986–87
3	Gary Domzalski	185	1975–76
4	Jarod Oldham	183	2011–12
5	Modie Cox	182	1994–95
6	Davonta Jordan	168	2019–20
7	Tyson Dunn	165	2024–25
8	John Boyer	159	2009–10
9	Ken Pope	156	1973–74
10	Byron Mulkey	154	2010–11

Single game
Rk	Player	Assists	Season	Opponent
1	Gary Domzalski	22	1974–75	Youngstown State
2	George Cooper	18	1975–76	
3	Modie Cox	15	1994–95	Chicago State
	Ken Pope	15	1973–74	Rochester
5	Byron Mulkey	14	2006–07	Ohio
	Michael Washington	14	1988–89	Mansfield
	Michael Washington	14	1988–89	Pitt-Johnstown
	Michael Washington	14	1988–89	Queens
	Tyson Dunn	14	2024–25	Fredonia State
10	Steve Fox	13	1983–84	Geneseo

== Steals ==
Career
Rk	Player	Steals	Seasons
1	Louis Campbell	198	1998–99 1999–00 2000–01 2001–02
2	Andy Robinson	187	2005–06 2006–07 2007–08 2008–09
3	Michael Washington	184	1986–87 1987–88 1988–89
4	Davonta Jordan	179	2016–17 2017–18 2018–19 2019–20
5	Rasaun Young	172	1993–94 1994–95 1996–97 1997–98

Season
Rk	Player	Steals	Season
1	Byron Mulkey	85	2010–11
2	Brian Houston	76	1989–90
3	Michael Washington	74	1987–88
4	John Blalock	70	1991–92
	Ron Downs	70	1982–83
6	Modie Cox	68	1994–95
7	Gary Domzalski	67	1974–75
	Davonta Jordan	67	2019–20
9	Bernard Wheeler	66	1995–96
10	Woodrow Williams	61	1993–94

Single game
Rk	Player	Steals	Season	Opponent
1	Yazid Powell	8	2022–23	Miami U.
	Modie Cox	8	1994–95	Iona
	Michael Washington	8	1987–88	Pace
	Gary Domzalski	8	1973–74	

== Blocks ==
Career
Rk	Player	Blocks	Seasons
1	Sam Pellom	375	1974–75 1975–76 1976–77 1977–78
2	Javon McCrea	250	2010–11 2011–12 2012–13 2013–14
3	Mitchell Watt	196	2008–09 2009–10 2010–11 2011–12
4	Kelvin Robinson	148	1993–94 1994–95
5	Mark Bortz	127	2001–02 2002–03 2003–04 2004–05

Season
Rk	Player	Blocks	Season
1	Sam Pellom	155	1974–75
2	Sam Pellom	97	1975–76
3	Javon McCrea	89	2012–13
4	Kelvin Robinson	80	1994–95
5	Mitchell Watt	74	2010–11
6	Kelvin Robinson	68	1993–94
	Mitchell Watt	68	2011–12
8	Javon McCrea	65	2013–14
9	Sam Pellom	64	1977–78
10	Mike McKie	63	1999–00

Single game
Rk	Player	Blocks	Season	Opponent
1	Sam Pellom	13	1975–76	Cleveland State
2	Sam Pellom	9	1974–75	
3	Javon McCrea	8	2012–13	Kent State
	Maliso Libomi	8	1998–99	Northern Illinois
	Kelvin Robinson	8	1993–94	Northeastern Illinois
	Mitchell Watt	8	2010–11	Kent State
	Javon McCrea	8	2013–14	Northern Illinois
	Raheem Johnson	8	2016–17	Bowling Green
9	Kelvin Robinson	7	1994–95	UNC Greensboro
	Kelvin Robinson	7	1994–95	Youngstown State
	Kelvin Robinson	7	1994–95	Western Illinois
	Darryl Hall	7	1987–88	Saginaw Valley State
	Derwin Harris	7	1982–83	Brockport Golden Eagles
	Otis Horne	7	1973–74	
