= List of Buffalo Bulls men's basketball head coaches =

The following is a list of Buffalo Bulls men's basketball head coaches. The Bulls have had 15 coaches in their 106-season history.

Buffalo's current head coach is George Halcovage. He was hired in March 2023 to replace Jim Whitesell, who was fired after the 2022–23 season.

| No. | Tenure | Coach | Years | Record | Pct. |
|---|---|---|---|---|---|
| 1 | 1915–1943 | Art Powell | 28 | 198–190 | .510 |
| 2 | 1945–1946 | Robert Harrington | 1 | 5–10 | .333 |
| 3 | 1946–1956 | Malcolm Eiken | 10 | 140–73 | .657 |
| 4 | 1956–1970 | Len Serfustini | 14 | 206–105 | .662 |
| 5 | 1970–1973 | Edwin Muto | 3 | 37–33 | .529 |
| 6 | 1973–1978 | Leo Richardson | 5 | 35–92 | .276 |
| 7 | 1978–1982 | V. William Hughes | 4 | 49–60 | .450 |
| 8 | 1982–1983 | Kenneth Pope | 1 | 12–15 | .444 |
| 9 | 1983–1993 | Daniel Bazzani | 10 | 111–154 | .419 |
| 10 | 1993–1999 (Note: Cohane resigned five games into the 1999–2000 season amidst an NCAA investigation. Witherspoon was named interim head coach, and was named permanent head coach in March of 2000.) | Tim Cohane | 7 | 80–93 | .462 |
| 11 | 1999–2013 | Reggie Witherspoon | 14 | 198–228 | .465 |
| 12 | 2013–2015 | Bobby Hurley | 2 | 42–20 | .677 |
| 13 | 2015–2019 | Nate Oats | 4 | 96–43 | .691 |
| 14 | 2019–2023 | Jim Whitesell | 4 | 70–49 | .588 |
| 15 | 2023–present | George Halcovage | 1 | 0–0 | – |
| Totals | | 15 coaches | 106 seasons | 1,279–1,165 | .523 |
Records updated through end of 2022–23 season Source
