= 1924–25 Buffalo Bisons men's basketball team =

American college basketball season

1924–25 Buffalo Bisons men's basketball
- Conference: Independent
- Record: 7–6
- Head coach: Art Powell (10th season)

The 1924–25 Buffalo Bisons men's basketball team represented the University of Buffalo during the 1924–25 NCAA college men's basketball season. The head coach was Art Powell, coaching his tenth season with the Bisons.

== Schedule ==
Date time, TV	Opponent	Result	Record	Site city, state
	at Mechanics	W 40–09	1–0	
	at Toronto	W 37–22	2–0	Toronto, ON
	Cornell	L 12–14	2–1	Buffalo, NY
	Queen's	W 36–07	3–1	Buffalo, NY
	Hobart	W 43–21	4–1	Buffalo, NY
	Colgate	L 28–35	4–2	Buffalo, NY
	R.P.I.	L 14–27	4–3	Buffalo, NY
	Davis-Elkins	L 23–27	4–4	Buffalo, NY
	at Hobart	W 35–12	5–4	Geneva, NY
	Rochester	L 19–22	5–5	Buffalo, NY
	at Colgate	L 22–23	5–6	Hamilton, NY
	St. Lawrence	W 33–14	6–6	Buffalo, NY
	Alfred	W 28–19	7–6	Buffalo, NY
*Non-conference game. (#) Tournament seedings in parentheses.
