= Erwin A. Heers =

American football and basketball player and coach

Biographical details
- Born: July 4, 1896; Wellsville, New York, U.S.
- Died: June 11, 1960 (aged 63)

Playing career
- 1920–1922: Syracuse

Coaching career (HC unless noted)

Football
- 1923–1924: Syracuse (assistant)
- 1926–1929: Alfred
- 1931: Rider (freshmen)

Basketball
- 1926–1930: Alfred

Administrative career (AD unless noted)
- 1926–1930: Alfred

Erwin A. Heers (July 4, 1896 – 11 June 1960) was an American college football and basketball player and coach. He served as the head football coach at Alfred University in Alfred, New York from 1926 to 1929. He also served as the freshmen football coach at Rider University in 1931. The school had no varsity team that year.
