= 1933–34 Niagara Purple Eagles men's basketball team =

American college basketball season

1933–34 Niagara Purple Eagles men's basketball
- Conference: Independent
- Record: 11–9
- Head coach: John Gallagher (3rd season)

The 1933–34 Niagara Purple Eagles men's basketball team represented Niagara University during the 1933–34 NCAA college men's basketball season. The head coach was John Gallagher, coaching his third season with the Purple Eagles.

== Schedule ==
Date time, TV	Opponent	Result	Record	Site city, state
12/08/1933	St. Michael's (Ont.)	W 44–12	1–0	Lewiston, NY
12/12/1933	at Colgate	L 34–39	1–1	Hamilton, NY
12/15/1933	Toronto	W 33–23	2–1	Lewiston, NY
12/19/1933	Hobart	W 35–14	3–1	Lewiston, NY
12/29/1933	at Brooklyn K of C	L 25–27	3–2	
12/30/1933	at St. John's	L 21–35	3–3	Old Madison Square Garden; Queens, NY
1/01/1934	at John Marshall	W 52–22	4–3	Jersey City, NJ
1/02/1934	at La Salle	W 33–28	5–3	Philadelphia, PA
1/13/1934	at Alfred	L 20–30	5–4	Alfred, NY
1/17/1934	Buffalo	W 36–29	6–4	Lewiston, NY
1/21/1934	at St. Bonaventure	L 22–26	7–4	Butler Gym; Olean, NY
1/27/1934	at Canisius	L 34–36	7–5	Buffalo, NY
2/04/1934	Niagara Freshman	W 46–33	7–6	Lewiston, NY
2/09/1934	at St. Lawrence	L 17–24	7–7	Canton, NY
2/10/1934	at Clarkson Tech	L 27–30	7–8	
2/14/1934	Buffalo State	W 43–23	8–8	Lewiston, NY
2/18/1934	at St. Bonaventure	W 48–33	9–8	Lewiston, NY
2/21/1934	at Syracuse	L 15–51	9–9	Archbold Gymnasium; Syracuse, NY
2/25/1934	Canisius	W 29–25	10–9	Lewiston, NY
3/03/1934	at Buffalo	W 37–24	11–9	Elmwood Music Hall; Buffalo, NY
*Non-conference game. (#) Tournament seedings in parentheses.
