= 1933–34 Buffalo Bulls men's basketball team =

American college basketball season

1933–34 Buffalo Bulls men's basketball
- Conference: Independent
- Record: 5–10
- Head coach: Art Powell (19th season)

The 1933–34 Buffalo Bulls men's basketball team represented the University of Buffalo during the 1933–34 NCAA college men's basketball season. The head coach was Art Powell, coaching his nineteenth season with the Bulls.

== Schedule ==
Date time, TV	Opponent	Result	Record	Site city, state
	Toronto	W 41–16	1–0	Buffalo, NY
	Hobart	W 34–30	2–0	Buffalo, NY
	Syracuse	L 23–42	2–1	Buffalo, NY
	at St. Lawrence	L 27–33	2–2	Canton, NY
	at Clarkson	W 31–29	3–2	Potsdam, NY
	at Michigan State	L 30–37	3–3	Detroit, MI
	at Niagara	L 28–36	3–4	Lewiston, NY
	at Alfred	L 26–28	3–5	Alfred, NY
	Alfred	W 33–31	4–5	Buffalo, NY
	Clarkson	L 29–34	4–6	Buffalo, NY
	St. Lawrence	L 27–32	4–7	Buffalo, NY
	Colgate	L 24–27	4–8	Buffalo, NY
	at Hobart	W 31–17	5–8	Geneva, NY
	at Syracuse	L 23–62	5–9	Archbold Gymnasium; Syracuse, NY
	Niagara	L 24–37	5–10	Buffalo, NY
*Non-conference game. (#) Tournament seedings in parentheses.
