= 1941–42 Buffalo Bulls men's basketball team =

American college basketball season

1941–42 Buffalo Bulls men's basketball
- Conference: Independent
- Record: 2–8
- Head coach: Art Powell (26th season)

The 1941–42 Buffalo Bulls men's basketball team represented the University of Buffalo during the 1941–42 NCAA college men's basketball season. The head coach was Art Powell, coaching his twenty-sixth season with the Bulls.

== Schedule ==
Date time, TV	Opponent	Result	Record	Site city, state
1/09/1942	Hamilton	L 34–47	0–1	Hamilton, NY
1/10/1942	at Union	L 29–50	0–2	Schenectady, NY
2/02/1942	at Marietta	L 31–54	0–3	Buffalo, NY
2/04/1942	Rochester	L 27–37	0–4	Buffalo, NY
2/07/1942	Alfred	W 47–34	1–4	Buffalo, NY
2/13/1942	at Hobart	L 36–51	1–5	Geneva, NY
2/18/1942	at Rochester	L 35–47	1–6	Rochester, NY
2/20/1942	at Alfred	L 37–59	1–7	Alfred, NY
3/04/1942	Hobart	L 33–36	1–8	Buffalo, NY
3/07/1942	Susquehanna	W 40–27	2–8	Buffalo, NY
*Non-conference game. (#) Tournament seedings in parentheses.
