= 1939–40 Buffalo Bulls men's basketball team =

American college basketball season

1939–40 Buffalo Bulls men's basketball
- Conference: Independent
- Record: 1–10
- Head coach: Art Powell (24th season)

The 1939–40 Buffalo Bulls men's basketball team represented the University of Buffalo during the 1939–40 NCAA college men's basketball season. The head coach was Art Powell, coaching his twenty-fourth season with the Bulls.

== Schedule ==
Date time, TV	Opponent	Result	Record	Site city, state
12/14/1939	McMaster	W 40–19	1–0	Buffalo, NY
12/23/1939	Ohio Wesleyan	L 35–61	1–1	Buffalo, NY
1/02/1940	Ohio	L 23–78	1–2	Buffalo, NY
1/06/1940	at Colgate	L 31–73	1–3	Hamilton, NY
1/12/1940	Western Res.	L 37–58	1–4	Buffalo, NY
2/03/1940	Wayne	L 22–49	1–5	Buffalo, NY
2/10/1940	at Rochester	L 34–42	1–6	Rochester, NY
2/13/1940	at Hobart	L 17–48	1–7	Geneva, NY
2/17/1940	Rochester	L 25–55	1–8	Buffalo, NY
2/24/1940	Alfred	L 30–34	1–9	Buffalo, NY
3/03/1940	Hobart	L 46–47	1–10	Buffalo, NY
*Non-conference game. (#) Tournament seedings in parentheses.
