= 1934–35 Buffalo Bulls men's basketball team =

American college basketball season

1934–35 Buffalo Bulls men's basketball
- Conference: Independent
- Record: 3–9
- Head coach: Art Powell (20th season)

The 1934–35 Buffalo Bulls men's basketball team represented the University of Buffalo during the 1934–35 NCAA college men's basketball season. The head coach was Art Powell, coaching his twentieth season with the Bulls.

== Schedule ==
Date time, TV	Opponent	Result	Record	Site city, state
	Toronto	L 38–44	0–1	Buffalo, NY
	Michigan	L 21–41	0–2	Buffalo, NY
	Cornell	W 32–31	1–2	Buffalo, NY
	at Clarkson	L 31–47	1–3	Potsdam, NY
	at St. Lawrence	L 20–28	1–4	Canton, NY
	at Alfred	L 21–22	1–5	Alfred, NY
	Alfred	W 30–28	2–5	Buffalo, NY
	at Hobart	L 27–29	2–6	Geneva, NY
	Clarkson	L 20–32	2–7	Buffalo, NY
	St. Lawrence	L 37–51	2–8	Buffalo, NY
	Colgate	L 26–33	2–9	Buffalo, NY
	Hobart	W 43–26	3–9	Buffalo, NY
*Non-conference game. (#) Tournament seedings in parentheses.
