= 1932–33 Buffalo Bulls men's basketball team =

American college basketball season

1932–33 Buffalo Bulls men's basketball
- Conference: Independent
- Record: 10–9
- Head coach: Art Powell (18th season)

The 1931–32 Buffalo Bulls men's basketball team represented the University of Buffalo during the 1932–33 NCAA college men's basketball season. The head coach was Art Powell, coaching his eighteenth season with the Bulls.

== Schedule ==
Date time, TV	Opponent	Result	Record	Site city, state
	Ithaca	L 20–23	0–1	Buffalo, NY
	Toronto	W 37–24	1–1	Buffalo, NY
	at Hobart	W 20–18	2–1	Geneva, NY
	Cornell	L 26–35	2–2	Buffalo, NY
	Syracuse	L 24–37	2–3	Buffalo, NY
	at Clarkson	W 35–30	3–3	
	at St. Lawrence	L 23–44	3–4	Canton, NY
	Allegheny	W 30–28	4–4	Buffalo, NY
	at Rochester	W 38–21	5–4	Rochester, NY
	Michigan State	L 18–29	5–5	Buffalo, NY
	Niagara	L 25–29	5–6	Buffalo, NY
	Alfred	W 42–32	6–6	Buffalo, NY
	at Alfred	L 39–40	6–7	Alfred, NY
	at Syracuse	L 22–48	6–8	Archbold Gymnasium; Syracuse, NY
	Clarkson	W 45–38	7–8	Buffalo, NY
	St. Lawrence	W 37–34	8–8	Buffalo, NY
	at Niagara	L 37–44	8–9	Lewiston, NY
	Hobart	W 53–20	9–9	Buffalo, NY
	Rochester	W 30–26	10–9	Buffalo, NY
*Non-conference game. (#) Tournament seedings in parentheses.
