= 1920–21 Buffalo Bisons men's basketball team =

American college basketball season

1920–21 Buffalo Bisons men's basketball
- Conference: Independent
- Record: 12–6
- Head coach: Art Powell (6th season)

The 1920–21 Buffalo Bisons men's basketball team represented the University of Buffalo during the 1920–21 NCAA college men's basketball season. The head coach was Art Powell, coaching his sixth season with the Bisons.

== Schedule ==
Date time, TV	Opponent	Result	Record	Site city, state
	at Syracuse	L 16–24	0–1	Archbold Gymnasium; Syracuse, NY
	Yale	L 26–29	0–2	Buffalo, NY
	Cornell	W 23–22	1–2	Buffalo, NY
	at Alfred	W 29–07	2–2	Alfred, NY
	Westminster	W 38–06	3–2	Buffalo, NY
	at Thiel	W 49–19	4–2	Buffalo, NY
	at Cornell	L 14–26	4–3	Barton Hall; Ithaca, NY
	Syracuse	W 18–10	5–3	Buffalo, NY
	Union	W 33–20	6–3	Buffalo, NY
	Carnegie Tech	W 35–18	7–3	Buffalo, NY
	at Allegheny	L 22–23	7–4	Meadville, PA
	at Carnegie Tech	W 29–24	8–4	Pittsburgh, PA
	Geneva	L 23–25	8–5	Beaver Falls, PA
	Penn State	L 16–43	8–6	Armory; University Park, PA
	Centre	W 40–28	9–6	Buffalo, NY
	Allegheny	W 26–14	10–6	Buffalo, NY
	Canisius	W 31–21	11–6	Buffalo, NY
	Canisius	W 22–12	12–6	Buffalo, NY
*Non-conference game. (#) Tournament seedings in parentheses.
