= 1932–33 Niagara Purple Eagles men's basketball team =

American college basketball season

1932–33 Niagara Purple Eagles men's basketball
- Conference: Independent
- Record: 13–6
- Head coach: John Gallagher (2nd season)

The 1932–33 Niagara Purple Eagles men's basketball team represented Niagara University during the 1932–33 NCAA college men's basketball season. The head coach was John Gallagher, coaching his second season with the Purple Eagles.

== Schedule ==
Date time, TV	Opponent	Result	Record	Site city, state
	Toronto	W 36–25	1–0	Lewiston, NY
	St. Michael's Ont.	W 34–20	2–0	Lewiston, NY
	Buffalo State	W 37–25	3–0	Lewiston, NY
12/31/1932	at St. John's	L 23–26	3–1	Old Madison Square Garden; Queens, NY
	at Brooklyn K of C	L 22–25	3–2	
	at Manhattan	L 21–30	3–3	Riverdale, NY
	at Rochester	W 23–20	4–3	Rochester, NY
	at Cornell	L 28–61	4–4	Barton Hall; Ithaca, NY
	Alfred	W 47–23	5–4	Lewiston, NY
	at Buffalo	W 29–25	6–4	Buffalo, NY
1/22/1933	St. Bonaventure	W 32–28	7–4	Lewiston, NY
1/29/1933	at St. Bonaventure	L 20–30	7–5	Butler Gym; Olean, NY
2/05/1933	Canisius	W 35–32 ^{OT}	8–5	Lewiston, NY
	at Hobart	W 47–29	9–5	Chicago, IL
	Clarkson Tech	W 40–33	10–5	Lewiston, NY
	St. Lawrence	W 32–24	11–5	Lewiston, NY
3/18/1933	at Syracuse	L 16–37	11–6	Archbold Gymnasium; Syracuse, NY
	Buffalo	W 44–37	12–6	Lewiston, NY
	at Canisius	W 45–43	13–6	Buffalo, NY
*Non-conference game. (#) Tournament seedings in parentheses.
