= 1940–41 Buffalo Bulls men's basketball team =

American college basketball season

1940–41 Buffalo Bulls men's basketball
- Conference: Independent
- Record: 4–9
- Head coach: Art Powell (25th season)

The 1940–41 Buffalo Bulls men's basketball team represented the University of Buffalo during the 1940–41 NCAA college men's basketball season. The head coach was Art Powell, coaching his twenty-fifth season with the Bulls.

== Schedule ==
Date time, TV	Opponent	Result	Record	Site city, state
	Alumni	W 49–29	1–0	Buffalo, NY
1/10/1941	at Wayne	L 26–35	1–1	
1/11/1941	at Western Res.	L 42–53	1–2	
2/05/1941	at Rochester	L 22–34	1–3	Buffalo, NY
2/07/1941	Oberlin	L 40–53	1–4	Buffalo, NY
2/12/1941	Alfred	W 45–40	2–4	Buffalo, NY
2/14/1941	Western Reserve	W 47–42	3–4	Buffalo, NY
2/15/1941	at Rochester	L 32–43	3–5	Rochester, NY
2/18/1941	Hobart	L 39–43	3–6	Geneva, NY
2/21/1940	Colgate	L 38–41	3–7	Buffalo, NY
2/26/1941	Alfred	W 55–40	4–7	Buffalo, NY
3/01/1941	Hobart	L 36–40	4–8	Buffalo, NY
3/03/1940	Allegheny	L 44–62	4–9	Buffalo, NY
*Non-conference game. (#) Tournament seedings in parentheses.
