= 1935–36 Buffalo Bulls men's basketball team =

American college basketball season

1935–36 Buffalo Bulls men's basketball
- Conference: Independent
- Record: 0–13
- Head coach: Art Powell (21st season)

The 1935–36 Buffalo Bulls men's basketball team represented the University of Buffalo during the 1935–36 NCAA college men's basketball season. The head coach was Art Powell, coaching his twenty-first season with the Bulls.

The season was described in The Buffalo Times as the "most disastrous" in Powell's tenure as coach.

== Schedule ==
Date time, TV	Opponent	Result	Record	Site city, state
12/14/1935	McMaster	L 19–36	0–1	Buffalo, NY
12/18/1935	Alfred	L 21–55	0–2	Buffalo, NY
1/04/1936	Oberlin	L 28–43	0–3	Buffalo, NY
1/10/1936	at St. Lawrence	L 16–53	0–4	Canton, NY
1/11/1936	at Clarkson	L 20–28	0–5	Potsdam, NY
2/01/1936	at Alfred	L 21–22	0–6	Alfred, NY
2/04/1936	Rochester	L 14–50	0–7	Buffalo, NY
2/08/1936	at Hobart	L 19–33	0–8	Geneva, NY
2/13/1936	Clarkson	L 19–32	0–9	Buffalo, NY
2/15/1936	St. Lawrence	L 26–52	0–10	Buffalo, NY
2/22/1936	Colgate	L 17–54	0–11	Buffalo, NY
2/29/1936	Hobart	L 19–37	0–12	Buffalo, NY
3/07/1936	Rochester	L 24–26	0–13	Buffalo, NY
*Non-conference game. (#) Tournament seedings in parentheses.
