= 1945–46 Buffalo Bulls men's basketball team =

American college basketball season

1945–46 Buffalo Bulls men's basketball
- Conference: Independent
- Record: 5–10
- Head coach: Robert Harrington (1st season)

The 1945–46 Buffalo Bulls men's basketball team represented the University of Buffalo during the 1945–46 NCAA college men's basketball season. The head coach was Robert Harrington, coaching his first season with the Bulls.

== Schedule ==
Date time, TV	Opponent	Result	Record	Site city, state
	at Toronto	L 11–91	0–1	Toronto, On
	Niagara	L 28–51	0–2	Buffalo, NY
	at Alfred	L 32–52	0–3	Alfred, NY
	McMaster	W 39–29	1–3	Buffalo, NY
	at Fredonia State	W 48–46	2–3	Fredonia, NY
	Toronto	L 31–55	2–4	Buffalo, NY
	Fredonia State	W 47–46	3–4	Buffalo, NY
	at Niagara	L 59–60	3–5	Lewiston, NY
	at West. Ontario	L 26–58	3–6	London, Ontario
	at Ontario	L 57–61	3–7	Ontario, Canada
	at Buffalo State	L 31–47	3–8	Buffalo, NY
	Western Ontario	L 42–51	3–9	Buffalo, NY
	Alfred	L 37–48	3–10	Buffalo, NY
	Buffalo State	W 54–44	4–10	Buffalo, NY
	Ontario	W 67–47	5–10	Buffalo, NY
*Non-conference game. (#) Tournament seedings in parentheses.
