= 1949–50 Buffalo Bulls men's basketball team =

American college basketball season

1949–50 Buffalo Bulls men's basketball
- Conference: Independent
- Record: 15–10
- Head coach: Malcolm S. Eiken (4th season)

The 1949–50 Buffalo Bulls men's basketball team represented the University of Buffalo during the 1949–50 NCAA college men's basketball season. The head coach was Malcolm S. Eiken, coaching his fourth season with the Bulls.

== Schedule ==
Date time, TV	Opponent	Result	Record	Site city, state
November 26, 1949	Wash. & Jeff.	L 40–64	0–1	Buffalo, New York
December 3, 1949	at Alfred	W 59–46	1–1	Alfred, New York
December 6, 1949	Cornell	L 36–66	1–2	Barton Hall; Ithaca, New York
December 9, 1949	at Western Reserve	W 61–50	2–2	Hudson, Ohio
December 10, 1949	at Case	L 56–58	2–3	Cleveland, Ohio
December 16, 1949	Toronto	W 60–34	3–3	Buffalo, New York
December 17, 1949	Washington St.	L 44–56	3–4	Buffalo, New York
December 23, 1949	Temple	W 62–56	3–5	Buffalo, New York
December 28, 1949	Colby	W 78–58	4–5	Buffalo, New York
December 30, 1949	Mississippi College	W 70–51	5–5	Buffalo, New York
January 3, 1950	at Rochester	W 67–58	6–5	Rochester, New York
January 6, 1950	Oberlin	W 67–34	7–5	Buffalo, New York
January 27, 1950	Alfred	W 75–34	8–5	Buffalo, New York
January 28, 1950	Connecticut	L 40–56	8–6	Buffalo, New York
January 30, 1950	Fredonia State	W 75–35	9–6	Buffalo, New York
February 2, 1950	Niagara	L 49–51	9–7	Buffalo, New York
February 8, 1950	at Toronto	W 57–29	10–7	Toronto, Ontario
February 10, 1950	Hamilton	W 67–41	11–7	Hamilton, New York
February 11, 1950	at Union	L 54–58	11–8	Schenectady, New York
February 16, 1950	at Hobart	W 66–46	12–8	Geneva, New York
February 17, 1950	at R.P.I.	L 53–59	12–9	Troy, New York
February 18, 1950	at Hawaii	W 69–50	13–9	Troy, New York
February 24, 1950	Western Reserve	W 77–64	14–9	Buffalo, New York
February 28, 1950	at Lafayette	L 49–67	14–10	Buffalo, New York
March 3, 1950	Hobart	W 54–51	15–10	Buffalo, New York
*Non-conference game. (#) Tournament seedings in parentheses.
