= 1947–48 Buffalo Bulls men's basketball team =

American college basketball season

1947–48 Buffalo Bulls men's basketball
- Conference: Independent
- Record: 13–8
- Head coach: Malcolm S. Eiken (2nd season)

The 1947–48 Buffalo Bulls men's basketball team represented the University of Buffalo during the 1947–48 NCAA college men's basketball season. The head coach was Malcolm S. Eiken, coaching his second season with the Bulls.

== Schedule ==
Date time, TV	Opponent	Result	Record	Site city, state
11/29/1947	Ontario	W 68–32	1–0	Buffalo, NY
12/05/1947	at Case	L 50–58	1–1	Cleveland, OH
12/09/1947	at West. Reserve	L 49–57	1–2	
12/12/1947	Hartwick	W 56–51	2–2	Buffalo, NY
12/13/1947	Hobart	W 52–40	3–2	Buffalo, NY
12/19/1947	Toronto	W 55–50	4–2	Buffalo, NY
12/30/1947	Missouri	L 50–51	4–3	Buffalo, NY
1/03/1948	Delaware	L 43–46	4–4	Buffalo, NY
1/08/1948	Western Reserve	W 45–40	5–4	Buffalo, NY
1/09/1948	at Alfred	W 54–50	6–4	Alfred, NY
1/15/1948	at Hobart	L 57–58	6–5	Geneva, NY
1/17/1948	at Toronto	W 68–42	7–5	Toronto, Ontario
	at Sampson	W 71–44	8–5	Seneca Lake, NY
2/09/1948	Fredonia State	W 58–29	9–5	Buffalo, NY
2/13/1948	at Grove City	L 48–63	9–6	Grove City, PA
2/14/1948	at Allegheny	W 46–45	10–6	Meadville, PA
2/19/1948	at Oberlin	W 56–53	11–6	Buffalo, NY
2/21/1948	R.P.I.	W 62–52	12–6	Buffalo, NY
2/26/1948	Niagara	L 49–69	12–7	Buffalo, NY
	Sampson	L 60–62	12–8	Buffalo, NY
3/03/1948	Alfred	W 50–39	13–8	Buffalo, NY
*Non-conference game. (#) Tournament seedings in parentheses.
