= 1942–43 Buffalo Bulls men's basketball team =

American college basketball season

1942–43 Buffalo Bulls men's basketball
- Conference: Independent
- Record: 7–6
- Head coach: Art Powell (27th season)

The 1942–43 Buffalo Bulls men's basketball team represented the University of Buffalo during the 1942–43 NCAA college men's basketball season. The head coach was Art Powell, coaching his twenty-seventh season with the Bulls.

== Schedule ==
Date time, TV	Opponent	Result	Record	Site city, state
12/02/1942	Fort Niagara	L 33–36	0–1	Buffalo, NY
12/05/1942	at Cornell	W 50–46	1–1	Barton Hall; Ithaca, NY
12/10/1942	Fredonia State	L 31–32	1–2	Buffalo, NY
12/18/1942	Hartwick	W 49–29	2–2	Buffalo, NY
12/19/1942	RPI	W 35–31	3–2	Buffalo, NY
1/09/1943	at Rochester	W 45–40	4–2	Rochester, NY
1/15/1943	Western Reserve	W 46–34	5–2	Buffalo, NY
	Buffalo State	L 33–35	5–3	Buffalo State
	Rochester	L 30–37	5–4	Buffalo, NY
	Hamilton	L 27–36	5–5	Buffalo, NY
	Fort Niagara	W 40–36	6–5	Buffalo, NY
	Colgate	W 46–26	6–6	Buffalo, NY
	Buffalo State	W 46–26	7–6	Buffalo, NY
*Non-conference game. (#) Tournament seedings in parentheses.
