= 1921–22 Buffalo Bisons men's basketball team =

American college basketball season

1921–22 Buffalo Bisons men's basketball
- Conference: Independent
- Record: 5–7
- Head coach: Art Powell (7th season)

The 1921–22 Buffalo Bisons men's basketball team represented the University of Buffalo during the 1921–22 NCAA college men's basketball season. The head coach was Art Powell, coaching his seventh season with the Bisons.

== Schedule ==
Date time, TV	Opponent	Result	Record	Site city, state
	at Rochester Opt.	W 33–21	1–0	
	Toronto	L 28–30	1–1	Buffalo, NY
	Cornell	L 13–36	1–2	Buffalo, NY
	Alumni	L 20–24	1–3	Buffalo, NY
	Ithaca	W 39–12	2–3	Buffalo, NY
	at Hobart	L 30–37	2–4	Geneva, NY
	Clarkson	W 25–18	3–4	Buffalo, NY
	Thiel	W 31–20	4–4	Buffalo, NY
	Rochester	W 21–11	5–4	Buffalo, NY
	Oberlin	L 26–27	5–5	Buffalo, NY
	Bethany	L 14–21	5–6	Buffalo, NY
	Creighton	L 27–36	5–7	Buffalo, NY
*Non-conference game. (#) Tournament seedings in parentheses.
