= 1923–24 Buffalo Bisons men's basketball team =

American college basketball season

1923–24 Buffalo Bisons men's basketball
- Conference: Independent
- Record: 7–6
- Head coach: Art Powell (9th season)

The 1923–24 Buffalo Bisons men's basketball team represented the University of Buffalo during the 1923–24 NCAA college men's basketball season. The head coach was Art Powell, coaching his ninth season with the Bisons.

== Schedule ==
Date time, TV	Opponent	Result	Record	Site city, state
	Mechanics	W 40–05	1–0	Buffalo, NY
	Toronto	W 37–22	2–0	Buffalo, NY
	Cornell	L 26–30	2–1	Buffalo, NY
	Hobart	W 31–17	3–1	Buffalo, NY
	Ithaca	W 39–12	2–3	Buffalo, NY
	at Rochester	L 17–35	3–2	Rochester, NY
	at Colgate	L 30–31	3–3	Hamilton, NY
	Rochester	L 23–29	3–4	Buffalo, NY
	at R.P.I.	L 27–30	3–5	Troy, NY
	Oberlin	W 27–17	4–5	Buffalo, NY
	Hobart	W 34–21	5–5	Buffalo, NY
	Colgate	L 17–24	5–6	Buffalo, NY
	at Lafayette	W 29–21	6–6	Buffalo, NY
	Alumni	W 35–13	7–6	Buffalo, NY
*Non-conference game. (#) Tournament seedings in parentheses.
