= 1938–39 Buffalo Bulls men's basketball team =

American college basketball season

1938–39 Buffalo Bulls men's basketball
- Conference: Independent
- Record: 2–12
- Head coach: Art Powell (23rd season)

The 1938–39 Buffalo Bulls men's basketball team represented the University of Buffalo during the 1938–39 NCAA college men's basketball season. The head coach was Art Powell, coaching his twenty-third season with the Bulls.

== Schedule ==
Date time, TV	Opponent	Result	Record	Site city, state
12/15/1938	McMaster	W 40–19	1–0	Buffalo, NY
12/17/1938	Ohio Wesleyan	L 35–61	1–1	Buffalo, NY
12/19/1938	at Ohio	L 38–58	2–1	Geneva, NY
1/06/1939	at Hamilton	L 36–43	1–3	Hamilton, NY
1/07/1939	at Union	L 50–54	1–4	Schenectady, NY
1/14/1939	Wayne	L 34–55	1–5	Buffalo, NY
2/03/1939	Marietta	L 35–49	1–6	Buffalo, NY
2/08/1939	Kent State	L 33–47	1–7	Buffalo, NY
2/11/1939	St. Lawrence	L 32–44	1–8	Buffalo, NY
2/13/1939	Rochester	L 29–52	1–9	Buffalo, NY
2/21/1939	at Hobart	L 29–42	1–10	Geneva, NY
2/24/1939	Hamilton	W 62–40	2–10	Buffalo, NY
2/25/1939	at Rochester	L 33–65	2–11	Rochester, NY
3/04/1939	Hobart	L 37–39	2–12	Buffalo, NY
*Non-conference game. (#) Tournament seedings in parentheses.
