= 1933–34 La Salle Explorers men's basketball team =

American college basketball season

1933–34 La Salle Explorers men's basketball
- Conference: Independent
- Record: 14–3
- Head coach: Leonard Tanseer (1st season)
- Captain: Clem Meehan
- Home arena: Wister Hall

The 1933–34 La Salle Explorers men's basketball team represented La Salle University during the 1933–34 NCAA men's basketball season. The head coach was Leonard Tanseer, coaching the explorers in his first season. The team finished with an overall record of 14–3.

== Schedule ==
Date time, TV	Opponent	Result	Record	Site city, state
Dec 8, 1933*	Penn A.C.	W 29–18	1–0	Wister Hall; Philadelphia, PA
Dec 13, 1933*	Pennsylvania	L 22–35	1–1	Wister Hall; Philadelphia, PA
Dec 16, 1933*	Catholic	W 34–30	2–1	Wister Hall; Philadelphia, PA
Jan. 2, 1934*	Niagara	L 28–33	2–2	Wister Hall; Philadelphia, PA
Jan. 5, 1934*	Baltimore	W 35–32	3–2	Wister Hall; Philadelphia, PA
Jan 10, 1934*	at Rider	W 38–25	4–2	Lawrenceville, NJ
Jan 16, 1934*	at Penn A.C.	W 37–24	5–2	Philadelphia, PA
Jan 26, 1934*	Scranton	W 25–22	6–2	Wister Hall; Philadelphia, PA
Jan. 30, 1934*	West Chester	W 37–23	7–2	Wister Hall; Philadelphia, PA
Feb. 3, 1934*	Saint Joseph's	W 27–15	8–2	Wister Hall; Philadelphia, PA
Feb. 7, 1934*	Morris-Harvey	W 38–36	9–2	Wister Hall; Philadelphia, PA
Feb. 10, 1934*	Saint Joseph's	W 39–20	10–2	Wister Hall; Philadelphia, PA
Feb. 18, 1934*	West Chester	W 25–24	11–2	Wister Hall; Philadelphia, PA
Feb. 22, 1934*	Loyola (MD)	W 49–25	12–2	Wister Hall; Philadelphia, PA
Feb. 28, 1934*	Phila. Osteopathy	W 32–13	13–2	Wister Hall; Philadelphia, PA
Mar. 2, 1934*	Scranton	W 28–23	14–2	Wister Hall; Philadelphia, PA
Mar. 7, 1934*	Villanova	L 23–25	14–3	Wister Hall; Philadelphia, PA
*Non-conference game. (#) Tournament seedings in parentheses.
