= 1946–47 Buffalo Bulls men's basketball team =

American college basketball season

1946–47 Buffalo Bulls men's basketball
- Conference: Independent
- Record: 12–5
- Head coach: Malcolm S. Eiken (1st season)

The 1946–47 Buffalo Bulls men's basketball team represented the University of Buffalo during the 1946–47 NCAA college men's basketball season. The head coach was Malcolm S. Eiken, coaching his first season with the Bulls.

== Schedule ==
Date time, TV	Opponent	Result	Record	Site city, state
	at Sampson	W 44–34	1–0	Toronto, On
12/14/1947	at Alfred	L 47–58	1–1	Alfred, NY
12/17/1946	at Hobart	W 57–47	2–1	Geneva, NY
12/21/1946	McMaster	W 92–29	3–1	Buffalo, NY
1/01/1947	SMU	L 37–64	3–2	Buffalo, NY
1/04/1947	Carnegie	W 45–31	4–2	Buffalo, NY
1/08/1947	at Niagara	L 24–63	4–3	Lewiston, NY
1/11/1947	Alfred	W 44–38	5–3	Buffalo, NY
	at West. Ontario	L 44–47	5–4	London, Ontario
	at Ontario	W 84–33	6–4	Ontario, Canada
1/18/1946	Hobart	W 48–26	7–4	Buffalo, NY
	Sampson AFB	W 58–51	8–4	Buffalo, NY
2/15/1947	Allegheny	W 46–43	9–4	Buffalo, NY
2/17/1947	Niagara	L 39–57	9–5	Buffalo, NY
2/22/1947	Case West. Res.	W 83–44	10–5	Buffalo, NY
2/26/1946	Fredonia State	W 61–28	11–5	Buffalo, NY
3/01/1947	Buffalo State	W 51–37	12–5	Buffalo, NY
*Non-conference game. (#) Tournament seedings in parentheses.
