= 1948–49 Buffalo Bulls men's basketball team =

American college basketball season

1948–49 Buffalo Bulls men's basketball
- Conference: Independent
- Record: 11–9
- Head coach: Malcolm S. Eiken (3rd season)

The 1948–49 Buffalo Bulls men's basketball team represented the University of Buffalo during the 1948–49 NCAA college men's basketball season. The head coach was Malcolm S. Eiken, coaching his third season with the Bulls.

== Schedule ==
Date time, TV	Opponent	Result	Record	Site city, state
12/04/1948	Hobart	W 54–36	1–0	Buffalo, NY
12/08/1948	at Case	L 44–67	1–1	Ithaca, NY
12/10/1948	Case	W 63–57	2–1	Buffalo, NY
12/17/1948	Toronto	W 69–45	3–1	Buffalo, NY
12/18/1948	Georgia	L 51–56	3–2	Buffalo, NY
12/27/1948	Lafayette	W 65–59	4–2	Buffalo, NY
12/30/1948	at Connecticut	L 39–52	4–3	Hawley Armory; Storrs, Connecticut
12/31/1948	Mississippi College	W 62–56	5–3	Buffalo, NY
1/08/1949	Alfred	L 45–54	5–4	Buffalo, NY
1/31/1949	at Fredonia State	W 59–31	6–4	Buffalo, NY
2/03/1949	at Niagara	W 59–53	7–4	Buffalo, NY
2/05/1949	at Oberlin	L 52–53	7–5	Oberlin, Ohio
2/09/1949	at Toronto	L 46–55	7–6	Toronto, Ontario
2/11/1949	Union	W 50–47	8–6	Buffalo, NY
2/17/1949	at Alfred	W 65–45	9–6	Alfred, New York
2/19/1949	Bucknell	W 58–50	10–6	Buffalo, NY
2/23/1949	at Hobart	W 67–55	11–6	Geneva, NY
2/25/1949	Grove City	L 42–46	11–7	Buffalo, NY
3/04/1949	at Hartwick	L 56–68	11–8	Oneonta, NY
3/05/1949	at R.P.I.	L 40–58	11–9	Troy, NY
*Non-conference game. (#) Tournament seedings in parentheses.
