= 1951–52 Buffalo Bulls men's basketball team =

American college basketball season

1951–52 Buffalo Bulls men's basketball
- Conference: Independent
- Record: 18–6
- Head coach: Malcolm S. Eiken (6th season)

The 1951–52 Buffalo Bulls men's basketball team represented the University of Buffalo during the 1951–52 NCAA college men's basketball season. The head coach was Malcolm S. Eiken, coaching his sixth season with the Bulls.

== Schedule ==
Date time, TV	Opponent	Result	Record	Site city, state
11/21/1951	Ontario	W 108–37	1–0	Buffalo, NY
11/24/1951	Grove City	W 62–57	2–0	Buffalo, NY
11/30/1951	McMaster	W 106–40	3–0	Buffalo, NY
12/5/1951	at Alfred	W 63–55	4–0	Alfred, NY
12/8/1951*	at Connecticut	L 69–72	4–1	Hawley Armory; Storrs, CT
12/10/1951	Hobart	W 70–47	5–1	Buffalo, NY
12/12/1951	Toronto	W 81–54	6–1	Buffalo, NY
	Buffalo State	W 74–65	7–1	Buffalo, NY
12/20/1951	Colgate	L 60-68	7-2	Buffalo, NY
12/21/1951	at Case	W 92-70	8–2	Cathedral Latin Gym; Cleveland, OH
12/22/1951	at Western Reserve	W 63-59	9–2	Cleveland, OH
12/27/1951	Connecticut	W 65-58	10–2	Buffalo, NY
1/2/1952	Colby	W 65-48	11–2	Buffalo, NY
1/8/1952	Niagara	W 80-78	12–2	Buffalo, NY
1/11/1952	Gannon	W 72-50	13–2	Buffalo, NY
1/11/1952	Alfred	W 69–59	14-2	Buffalo, NY
2/9/1952	at Rochester	L 64–65	14-3	Rochester, NY
2/12/1952	Canisius	L 77–83	14–4	Buffalo, NY
2/16/1952	Bucknell	W 91-75	15–4	Buffalo, NY
2/22/1952	Western Reserve	W 88-67	16–4	Buffalo, NY
2/23/1952	Lafayette	L 61-67	16–5	Buffalo, NY
	at R.P.I.	W 68-63	17–5	Troy, NY
	at Hobart	W 72-55	18–5	Troy, NY
NAIA District Playoffs
3/1/1952	Farliegh Dickinson	L 55-63	18–6	
*Non-conference game. (#) Tournament seedings in parentheses.
