= 1952–53 Buffalo Bulls men's basketball team =

American college basketball season

1952–53 Buffalo Bulls men's basketball
- Conference: Independent
- Record: 10–9
- Head coach: Malcolm S. Eiken (7th season)

The 1952–53 Buffalo Bulls men's basketball team represented the University of Buffalo during the 1952–53 NCAA college men's basketball season. The head coach was Malcolm S. Eiken, coaching his seventh season with the Bulls.

== Schedule ==
Date time, TV	Opponent	Result	Record	Site city, state
	Wash. & Jeff.	W 63–55	1–0	Buffalo, NY
	Grove City	W 87–63	2–0	Buffalo, NY
	at Hobart	W 58–52	3–0	Geneva, NY
	Alfred	W 73–58	4–0	Buffalo, NY
	R.P.I.	W 78–51	5–0	Buffalo, NY
	Case	L 81–82	5–1	Buffalo, NY
	at Canisius	L 55–71	5–2	Buffalo, NY
	Ontario	W 88–39	6–2	Buffalo, NY
	at Colgate	L 67-82	6-3	Hamilton, NY
	Niagara	L 46-57	6–4	Buffalo, NY
	at Buffalo State	W 84-70	7–4	Buffalo, NY
	Rochester	W 82-71	8–4	Buffalo, NY
	at Gannon	L 63-77	8–5	Erie, PA
	Canisius	L 59-69	8–6	Buffalo, NY
	at Alfred	L 56-71	8–7	Alfred, NY
	Lafayette	L 55–58	8-8	Buffalo, NY
	Hobart	W 71–57	9–8	Buffalo, NY
	Bucknell	W 82–58	10–8	Buffalo, NY
	at Toronto	L 50–80	10–9	Toronto, Ontario
*Non-conference game. (#) Tournament seedings in parentheses.
