= Reggie Witherspoon (basketball) =

American basketball coach (born 1961)

- Witherspoon at Alumni Arena in 2006

Biographical details
- Born: February 21, 1961 (age 65); Buffalo, New York, U.S.
- Education: Empire State College ('95)

Playing career
- Erie CC
- Wheeling Jesuit

Coaching career (HC unless noted)
- 1984–1992: Sweet Home HS (assistant)
- 1992–1997: Sweet Home HS
- 1997–1999: Erie CC
- 1999–2013: Buffalo
- 2014–2015: Alabama (assistant)
- 2015–2016: Chattanooga (assistant)
- 2016–2024: Canisius

Head coaching record
- Overall: 306–358 (.461) 43–15 (.741) (NJCAA)
- Tournaments: 1–1 (NIT); 0–2 (CBI); 3–3 (CIT)

Accomplishments and honors

Championships
- MAC regular season champion (2009); MAAC regular season champion (2018)

Awards
- MAC Coach of the Year (2004)

Phillip Reginald Witherspoon (born February 21, 1961) is an American college basketball coach who is the former men's basketball head coach of the Canisius Golden Griffins and the Buffalo Bulls.

Witherspoon played college basketball at Erie Community College under John Beilein and then at Wheeling Jesuit under Jim O'Brien.

He was the head coach at Erie Community College, and head coach and assistant coach at Sweet Home High School before he was hired as the interim head coach at Buffalo in December 1999. Witherspoon was named full-time head coach on March 10, 2000. He was the first African American named head coach of a varsity sports team in any Western New York suburban school district. He was fired after the 2012–13 season, finishing his 14 season run with a 198–228 record. Witherspoon served one season as an assistant at Alabama under head coach Anthony Grant. In 2015, Witherspoon was let go by Alabama when Grant was replaced by Avery Johnson. He was subsequently named as an assistant on Matt McCall's staff at UT-Chattanooga.

In May 2016, Witherspoon was hired to replace the retiring Jim Baron at Canisius College. In the 2017–18 season, the Golden Griffins finished tied for a share of the Metro Atlantic Athletic Conference regular-season title and qualified for the 2018 College Basketball Invitational.

On March 16, 2024, Canisius announced that it had parted ways with Witherspoon after eight seasons.

== Head coaching record ==
Record table
Season	Team	Overall	Conference	Standing	Postseason
Erie Community College (NJCAA Region III) (1997–1999)
1997–98	Erie CC	19–10			
1998–99	Erie CC	24–5			
Erie CC:		43–15 (.741)			
University at Buffalo (Mid-American Conference) (1999–2013)
1999–00*	Buffalo	3–20 (5–23)	1–17	12th	
2000–01	Buffalo	4–24	2–16	12th	
2001–02	Buffalo	12–18	7–11	10th	
2002–03	Buffalo	5–23	2–16	13th	
2003–04	Buffalo	17–12	11–7	5th	
2004–05	Buffalo	23–10	11–7	T–2nd	NIT First Round
2005–06	Buffalo	19–13	8–10	8th	
2006–07	Buffalo	12–19	4–12	T–10th	
2007–08	Buffalo	10–20	3–13	12th	
2008–09	Buffalo	21–12	11–5	T–1st	CBI First Round
2009–10	Buffalo	18–12	9–7	T–3rd	
2010–11	Buffalo	20–14	8–8	T–5th	CIT Quarterfinals
2011–12	Buffalo	20–11	12–4	2nd	CIT Second Round
2012–13	Buffalo	14–20	7–9	8th	
Buffalo:		198–228 (.465)	96–142 (.403)		
Canisius College (Metro Atlantic Athletic Conference) (2016–2024)
2016–17	Canisius	18–16	10–10	T–6th	CIT First Round
2017–18	Canisius	21–12	15–3	T–1st	CBI First Round
2018–19	Canisius	15–17	11–7	T–2nd	
2019–20	Canisius	12–20	7–13	10th	
2020–21	Canisius	7–6	7–5	4th	
2021–22	Canisius	11–21	7–13	T–10th	
2022–23	Canisius	10–20	8–12	T–8th	
2023–24	Canisius	14–18	8–12	9th	
Canisius College:		108–130 (.454)	73–75 (.493)		
Total:		306–358 (.461)			
National champion Postseason invitational champion Conference regular season champion Conference regular season and conference tournament champion Division regular season champion Division regular season and conference tournament champion Conference tournament champion

* Hired as interim coach after Tim Cohane resigned after 5 games
