= 1950–51 Buffalo Bulls men's basketball team =

American college basketball season

1950–51 Buffalo Bulls men's basketball
- Conference: Independent
- Record: 13–8
- Head coach: Malcolm S. Eiken (5th season)

The 1950–51 Buffalo Bulls men's basketball team represented the University of Buffalo during the 1950–51 NCAA college men's basketball season. The head coach was Malcolm S. Eiken, coaching his fifth season with the Bulls.

== Schedule ==
Date time, TV	Opponent	Result	Record	Site city, state
11/25/1950	Wash. & Jeff.	L 62–64	0–1	Buffalo, NY
	at Siena	W 59–46	0–2	Loudonville, NY
12/08/1950	Grove City	W 75–62	1–2	Buffalo, NY
12/15/1950	Toronto	W 78–57	2–2	Buffalo, NY
	Delaware	W 56–38	3–2	Buffalo, NY
12/16/1950	Washington St.	L 49–70	3–3	Buffalo, NY
12/19/1950	at Hobart	W 87–50	4–3	Geneva, NY
12/22/1950	Alfred	W 75–44	5–3	Buffalo, NY
	Connecticut	L 51–61	5–4	Buffalo, NY
12/28/1950	Case	W 56–53	6–4	Buffalo, NY
12/30/1950	Williams	W 68–49	7–4	Buffalo, NY
1/01/1951	Colby	L 56–76	7–5	Buffalo, NY
1/05/1951	Rochester	W 56–55	8–5	Buffalo, NY
1/11/1951	Niagara	L 41–59	8–6	Buffalo, NY
1/12/1951	at Alfred	W 47–45	9–6	Alfred, NY
2/05/1951	at Colgate	L 73–77	9–7	Hamilton, NY
	at Toronto	W 74–60	10–7	Toronto, Ontario
2/17/1951	Lafayette	W 69–55	11–7	Buffalo, NY
2/22/1951	Wake Forest	L 59–77	11–8	Buffalo, NY
2/24/1951	R.P.I.	W 82–66	12–8	Buffalo, NY
3/02/1951	Hobart	W 83–51	13–8	Buffalo, NY
*Non-conference game. (#) Tournament seedings in parentheses.
