= Sam Pellom =

American basketball player

Personal information
- Born: October 2, 1951 (age 75) Wilmington, North Carolina, U.S.
- Listed height: 6 ft 9 in (2.06 m)
- Listed weight: 224 lb (102 kg)

Career information
- High school: Leland (Leland, North Carolina)
- College: Buffalo (1974–1978)
- NBA draft: 1978: undrafted
- Playing career: 1979–1985
- Position: Power forward / center
- Number: 41

Career history
- 1979–1982: Atlanta Hawks
- 1982–1983: Milwaukee Bucks
- 1983: Lancaster Lightning
- 1983–1984: Tours BC
- 1984: C.D. San Andrés
- 1984−1985: Breogán Lugo

Career highlights
- NCAA rebounding leader (1976); No. 50 retired by Buffalo Bulls
- Stats at NBA.com
- Stats at Basketball Reference

Samuel Troy Pellom (born October 2, 1951) is an American former professional basketball player born in Wilmington, North Carolina. The 6'9" forward-center played professionally for the Atlanta Hawks and the Milwaukee Bucks of the NBA and played college basketball for the Buffalo Bulls, and was the first player from UB's basketball team to play in the NBA. Pellom also played for the Washington Generals, the team that plays the Harlem Globetrotters.

== Career statistics ==
Legend
GP	Games played	GS	Games started	MPG	Minutes per game
FG%	Field goal percentage	3P%	3-point field goal percentage	FT%	Free throw percentage
RPG	Rebounds per game	APG	Assists per game	SPG	Steals per game
BPG	Blocks per game	PPG	Points per game	**Bold**	Career high

=== NBA ===
==== Regular season ====
Year	Team	GP	GS	MPG	FG%	3P%	FT%	RPG	APG	SPG	BPG	PPG
1979–80	Atlanta	44		8.5	.407	–	.700	2.1	.4	.3	.3	2.5
1980–81	Atlanta	**77**		**19.1**	**.489**	.000	.698	**4.6**	**.6**	**.6**	**1.2**	**5.9**
1981–82	Atlanta	69	**4**	15.0	.454	.000	**.772**	3.3	.4	.4	.7	4.2
1982–83	Atlanta	2	0	4.5	.333	–	–	.0	.5	.0	.0	2.0
1982–83	Milwaukee	4	0	5.0	.400	–	–	2.0	.0	.0	.0	2.0
Career		196	4	14.9	.464	.000	.724	3.5	.5	.5	.8	4.4

==== Playoffs ====
Year	Team	GP	MPG	FG%	3P%	FT%	RPG	APG	SPG	BPG	PPG
1980	Atlanta	**4**	**4.5**	.000	–	**.333**	.0	**.3**	.0	**.3**	.3
1982	Atlanta	1	4.0	**.333**	–	–	**1.0**	.0	.0	.0	**2.0**
Career		5	4.4	.167	–	.333	.2	.2	.0	.2	.6
