= George Halcovage =

American college basketball coach (born 1986)

Current position
- Title: Head coach
- Team: Buffalo
- Conference: MAC
- Record: 32–67 (.323)
- Annual salary: $325,000

Biographical details
- Born: January 13, 1986 (age 40); Pottsville, Pennsylvania, U.S.

Playing career
- 2004–2008: Babson
- Position: Guard

Coaching career (HC unless noted)
- 2017–2021: Villanova (assistant)
- 2021–2023: Villanova (associate HC)
- 2023–present: Buffalo

Head coaching record
- Overall: 32–67 (.323)

George F. Halcovage III (born January 13, 1986) is an American college basketball coach, currently the head men's coach for the Buffalo Bulls men's basketball team.

== Early life ==
Halcovage grew up in Pottsville, Pennsylvania. Both of his parents were alumni of Villanova University and his uncle, Marty McCarthy, played for the Villanova Wildcats men's basketball team in the 1990s.

== Playing career ==
From 2004 to 2008, Halcovage played college basketball at Babson.

== Coaching career ==
Following his graduation from Babson, Halcovage's uncle, who had played under Jay Wright when he was an assistant at Villanova, put in a word on his nephew's behalf. Halcovage joined Wright at Villanova in 2008 as a graduate assistant and occupied various roles including video coordinator and director of basketball operations until 2017 when he was elevated to an assistant coach. Halcovage earned an MBA from Villanova in 2012. Upon Wright's retirement in 2022, Halcovage was retained as an assistant coach under Kyle Neptune. During his time with the Wildcats, he was part of seven Big East regular-season champion squads as well as four Final Four teams, including the 2016 and 2018 national championship teams.

On March 31, 2023, Halcovage was hired as head coach at Buffalo to replace Jim Whitesell.

== Head coaching record ==
Record table
Season	Team	Overall	Conference	Standing	Postseason
Buffalo Bulls (MAC) (2023–present)
2023–24	Buffalo	4–27	2–16	12th	
2024–25	Buffalo	9–22	4–14	11th	
2025–26	Buffalo	17–15	7–11	T–7th	
2026–27	Buffalo	2–3	0–0		
Buffalo:		32–67 (.323)	13–41 (.241)		
Total:		32–67 (.323)			
National champion Postseason invitational champion Conference regular season champion Conference regular season and conference tournament champion Division regular season champion Division regular season and conference tournament champion Conference tournament champion
