= 2018–19 Buffalo Bulls men's basketball team =

American college basketball season

2018–19 Buffalo Bulls men's basketball

Basketball Hall of Fame Belfast Classic Goliath Champions MAC East Division and regular season and tournament champions

NCAA tournament, Second Round
- Conference: Mid-American Conference
- East Division

Ranking
- Coaches: No. 17
- AP: No. 15
- Record: 32–4 (16–2 MAC)
- Head coach: Nate Oats (4th season)
- Assistant coaches: Jim Whitesell (4th season); Bryan Hodgson (4th season); Jamie Quarles (2nd season)
- Home arena: Alumni Arena

2018–19 Mid-American Conference men's basketball standings
	Conf.				Overall
Team	W		L	PCT	W		L	PCT
East
No. 15 Buffalo †	16	–	2	.889	32	–	4	.889
Bowling Green	12	–	6	.667	22	–	12	.647
Kent State	11	–	7	.611	22	–	11	.667
Akron	8	–	10	.444	17	–	16	.515
Miami (OH)	7	–	11	.389	15	–	17	.469
Ohio	6	–	12	.333	14	–	17	.452
West
Toledo	13	–	5	.722	25	–	8	.758
Central Michigan	10	–	8	.556	23	–	12	.657
Eastern Michigan	9	–	9	.500	15	–	17	.469
Northern Illinois	8	–	10	.444	17	–	17	.500
Ball State	6	–	12	.333	16	–	17	.485
Western Michigan	2	–	16	.111	8	–	24	.250
† 2019 MAC tournament winner Rankings from AP Poll

The 2018–19 Buffalo Bulls men's basketball team represented the State University of New York at Buffalo during the 2018–19 NCAA Division I men's basketball season. The Bulls, led by fourth-year head coach Nate Oats, played their home games at Alumni Arena in Amherst, New York as members of the East Division of the Mid-American Conference (MAC).

The Bulls posted a school-record 32 wins, including an NCAA tournament victory over former head coach Bobby Hurley and Arizona State. Their season, which to that point was punctuated by a 13-game winning streak and MAC conference titles (regular and post-season), ended in a 78–58 loss to Texas Tech in the second round. At season's end, Oats departed to become head coach at Alabama, despite signing an extension with Buffalo a week earlier. 32 wins continues to be a MAC record shared with the 2025–26 Miami RedHawks men's basketball team.

== Previous season ==
The bulls finished the 2017–18 season 27–9, 15–3 in MAC play to win the MAC East Division and regular season championships. They defeated Central Michigan, Kent State, and Toledo to win the MAC tournament championship. As a result, they received the conference's automatic bid to the NCAA tournament. As the No. 13 seed in the South region, they upset Arizona in the first round before losing to Kentucky in the second round.

=== 2018 recruiting class ===
College recruiting
Name	Hometown	School	Height	Weight	Commit date
Jeenathan Williams; SF	Rochester, NY	Prolific Prep	6 ft 5 in (1.96 m)	190 lb (86 kg)	Sep 24, 2017
Jeenathan Williams; SF	Recruit ratings: Scout: Rivals: 247Sports: ESPN:				
Ronaldo Segu; PG	Orlando, Florida	Orlando Christian Prep	6 ft 0 in (1.83 m)	165 lb (75 kg)	Oct 1, 2017
Ronaldo Segu; PG	Recruit ratings: Scout: Rivals: 247Sports: ESPN:				
Overall recruit ranking:
Note: In many cases, Scout, Rivals, 247Sports, On3, and ESPN may conflict in their listings of height and weight.; In these cases, the average was taken. ESPN grades are on a 100-point scale.; Sources: "2018 Buffalo Bulls commits". Rivals.; "2018 Team Ranking". Rivals.

== Roster ==
2018–19 Buffalo Bulls men's basketball team
Players
Coaches

Pos.	#	Name	Height	Weight	Year	Previous school	Hometown
F	1	Montrell McRae	6 ft 10 in (2.08 m)	198 lb (90 kg)	Sr	Cleveland Central Catholic; South Plains College	Cleveland, OH
G	2	Jeremy Harris	6 ft 7 in (2.01 m)	185 lb (84 kg)	Sr	Page; Gulf Coast State College	Greensboro, NC
G	3	Jayvon Graves	6 ft 3 in (1.91 m)	193 lb (88 kg)	So	St. Vincent–St. Mary	Malvern, OH
G	4	Davonta Jordan	6 ft 2 in (1.88 m)	187 lb (85 kg)	Jr	Montverde Academy	Cocoa, FL
G	5	C. J. Massinburg	6 ft 3 in (1.91 m)	194 lb (88 kg)	Sr	South Oak Cliff	Dallas, TX
G	10	Ronaldo Segu	6 ft 0 in (1.83 m)	160 lb (73 kg)	Fr	Orlando Christian Prep	Orlando, FL
F	11	Jeenathan Williams	6 ft 5 in (1.96 m)	203 lb (92 kg)	Fr	Prolific Prep	Rochester, NY
G	20	Colby Moultrie	6 ft 3 in (1.91 m)	190 lb (86 kg)	So	Canisius HS	North Tonawanda, NY
F	21	Dominic Johnson	6 ft 5 in (1.96 m)	230 lb (104 kg)	So	Catholic Central	Windsor, ON
G	22	Dontay Caruthers	6 ft 1 in (1.85 m)	191 lb (87 kg)	Sr	East; Midland/Indian Hills	Rochester, NY
G	23	Jamon Bivens	6 ft 3 in (1.91 m)	190 lb (86 kg)	So	Fayette County HS	Atlanta, GA
F	24	Tra'von Fagan	6 ft 8 in (2.03 m)	200 lb (91 kg)	So	Cedar Falls; Florida SouthWestern State	Waterloo, IA
F	33	Nick Perkins	6 ft 8 in (2.03 m)	250 lb (113 kg)	Sr	Milan HS	Ypsilanti, MI
C	41	Brock Bertram	6 ft 11 in (2.11 m)	250 lb (113 kg)	So	Apple Valley	Apple Valley, MN

Head coach

- Nate Oats (Maranatha Baptist)

Assistant coach(es)

- Jim Whitesell (Luther)
- Bryan Hodgson (Fredonia State)
- Jamie Quarles (Augusta State)

Legend

- (C) Team captain
- (S) Suspended
- (I) Ineligible
- (W) Walk-on
- Injured
- Current redshirt

Roster
Last update: 4 November 2018

== Schedule and results ==
The 2018-19 schedule was released on August 1, 2018. The Bulls participated in the Basketball Hall of Fame Belfast Classic in Belfast, Northern Ireland. 32 wins was both a school record and a Mid-American Conference record, which was tied by the 2025–26 Miami RedHawks men's basketball team.

Date time, TV	Rank^{#}	Opponent^{#}	Result	Record	High points	High rebounds	High assists	Site (attendance) city, state
Exhibition
October 26, 2018*; 7:00 pm, ESPN+		Daemen	W 97–50		14 – Segu	9 – Harris	7 – Segu	Alumni Arena (2,860); Amherst, NY
Non-conference regular season
November 6, 2018*; 4:00pm, ESPN+		Saint Francis (PA)	W 82–67	1–0	16 – Perkins	9 – Perkins	5 – Tied	Alumni Arena (1,852); Amherst, NY
November 9, 2018*; 9:00pm, ESPNU		at No. 13 West Virginia	W 99–94 ^{OT}	2–0	43 – Massinburg	14 – Massingburg	5 – Tied	WVU Coliseum (12,657); Morgantown, WV
November 12, 2018*; 8:00pm, ESPN+	No. 25	at Southern Illinois	W 62–53	3–0	11 – Tied	11 – Perkins	5 – Jordan	SIU Arena (4,373); Carbondale, IL
November 21, 2018*; 7:00pm, ESPN+	No. 22	Dartmouth; Basketball Hall of Fame Belfast Classic campus game	W 110–71	4–0	18 – Perkins	10 – Perkins	6 – Graves	Alumni Arena (3,573); Amherst, NY
November 24, 2018*; 2:00pm, ESPN3	No. 22	Marist; Basketball Hall of Fame Belfast Classic campus game	W 76–49	5–0	21 – Massinburg	7 – Perkins	8 – Harris	Alumni Arena (4,589); Amherst, NY
November 30, 2018*; 5:30am, BBC Sport	No. 21	vs. Milwaukee; Basketball Hall of Fame Belfast Classic semifinals	W 96–77	6–0	21 – Harris	10 – McRae	4 – Tied	SSE Arena; Belfast, Northern Ireland
December 1, 2018*; 10:30am, CBSSN	No. 21	vs. San Francisco; Basketball Hall of Fame Belfast Classic championship	W 85–81	7–0	22 – Perkins	8 – Tied	5 – Graves	SSE Arena; Belfast, Northern Ireland
December 5, 2018*; 7:00pm, ESPN3	No. 17	Le Moyne	W 89–55	8–0	20 – Caruthers	13 – Massinburg	10 – Massinburg	Alumni Arena (4,412); Amherst, NY
December 8, 2018*; 4:00pm, ESPN+	No. 17	at St. Bonaventure	W 80–62	9–0	19 – Graves	9 – Massinburg	7 – Jordan	Reilly Center (5,480); St. Bonaventure, NY
December 15, 2018*; 2:00pm, ESPN+	No. 14	Southern Illinois	W 73–65	10–0	20 – Perkins	11 – Perkins	4 – Jordan	Alumni Arena (5,513); Amherst, NY
December 18, 2018*; 8:00pm, ESPN2	No. 14	at Syracuse	W 71–59	11–0	25 – Massinburg	12 – Perkins	5 – Massinburg	Carrier Dome (18,620); Syracuse, NY
December 21, 2018*; 8:30pm, FS1	No. 14	at No. 20 Marquette	L 85–103	11–1	20 – Harris	7 – Tied	7 – Jordan	Fiserv Forum (17,567); Milwaukee, WI
December 29, 2018*; 7:00pm, ESPN+	No. 21	at Canisius	W 87–72	12–1	22 – Massinburg	9 – Tied	6 – Caruthers	Koessler Athletic Center (2,196); Buffalo, NY
MAC regular season
January 4, 2019; 9:00pm, CBSSN	No. 20	at Eastern Michigan	W 74–58	13–1 (1–0)	18 – McRae	12 – Harris	4 – Massinburg	Convocation Center (2,378); Ypsilanti, MI
January 8, 2019; 7:00pm, ESPN+	No. 19	Toledo	W 110–80	14–1 (2–0)	34 – Harris	12 – Graves	7 – Massinburg	Alumni Arena (5,144); Amherst, NY
January 12, 2019; 12:00pm, CBSSN	No. 19	Miami (OH)	W 88–64	15–1 (3–0)	17 – Harris	9 – Massinburg	6 – Caruthers	Alumni Arena (6,177); Amherst, NY
January 15, 2019; 7:00pm, ESPN+	No. 16	at Western Michigan	W 88–79	16–1 (4–0)	20 – Harris	11 – Harris	3 – Jordan	University Arena (2,179); Kalamazoo, MI
January 18, 2019; 7:00pm, ESPNU	No. 16	Eastern Michigan	W 77–65	17–1 (5–0)	31 – Massinburg	6 – Tied	8 – Jordan	Alumni Arena (6,193); Amherst, NY
January 22, 2019; 8:00pm, ESPN+	No. 14-T	at Northern Illinois	L 75–77	17–2 (5–1)	23 – Massinburg	8 – Harris	4 – Massinburg	Convocation Center (1,284); DeKalb, IL
January 25, 2019; 6:30pm, CBSSN	No. 14-T	at Kent State	W 88–79	18–2 (6–1)	20 – Tied	8 – Tied	5 – Caruthers	MAC Center (5,133); Kent, OH
January 29, 2019; 7:00pm, ESPN3	No. 18	Ball State	W 83–59	19–2 (7–1)	21 – Caruthers	12 – Graves	4 – Tied	Alumni Arena (4,747); Amherst, NY
February 1, 2019; 8:00pm, CBSSN	No. 18	at Bowling Green	L 88–92	19–3 (7–2)	28 – Caruthers	9 – McRae	4 – Jordan	Stroh Center (5,000); Bowling Green, OH
February 9, 2019; 3:30pm, ESPN+	No. 23	Central Michigan	W 90–76	20–3 (8–2)	19 – Harris	8 – Harris	8 – Jordan	Alumni Arena (6,437); Amherst, NY
February 12, 2019; 7:00pm, ESPN+	No. 25	at Akron	W 76–70	21–3 (9–2)	21 – Massinburg	9 – Perkins	2 – Tied	James A. Rhodes Arena (2,646); Akron, OH
February 15, 2019; 7:00pm, ESPNU	No. 25	at Toledo	W 88–82	22–3 (10–2)	26 – Perkins	10 – Harris	3 – Tied	Savage Arena (7,401); Toledo, OH
February 19, 2019; 7:00pm, ESPN+	No. 25	Ohio	W 114–67	23–3 (11–2)	26 – Graves	8 – Williams	9 – Jordan	Alumni Arena (6,231); Amherst, NY
February 22, 2019; 7:00pm, ESPN2	No. 25	Kent State	W 80–57	24–3 (12–2)	27 – Perkins	7 – Tied	8 – Jordan	Alumni Arena (6,688); Amherst, NY
February 26, 2019; 7:00pm, ESPN+	No. 21	Akron	W 77–64	25–3 (13–2)	25 – Perkins	10 – Massinburg	6 – Massinburg	Alumni Arena (5,789); Amherst, NY
March 1, 2019; 8:00pm, CBSSN	No. 21	at Miami (OH)	W 77–69	26–3 (14–2)	20 – Massinburg	10 – Massinburg	6 – Jordan	Millett Hall (3,026); Oxford, OH
March 5, 2019; 7:00pm, ESPN+	No. 19	at Ohio	W 82–79	27–3 (15–2)	20 – Harris	8 – Perkins	6 – Massinburg	Convocation Center (5,834); Athens, OH
March 8, 2019; 6:00pm, ESPNU	No. 19	Bowling Green	W 84–73	28–3 (16–2)	22 – Perkins	6 – Tied	8 – Caruthers	Alumni Arena (6,709); Amherst, NY
MAC Tournament
Mar 14, 2019; 12:00pm, ESPN+	(1) No. 18	vs. (8) Akron; Quarterfinals	W 82–46	29–3	23 – Harris	9 – Massinburg	3 – Tied	Quicken Loans Arena (2,499); Cleveland, OH
Mar 15, 2019; 6:00 pm, CBSSN	(1) No. 18	vs. (5) Central Michigan; Semifinals	W 85–81	30–3	21 – Massinburg	9 – Tied	4 – Graves	Quicken Loans Arena (6,044); Cleveland, OH
Mar 16, 2019; 7:30 pm, ESPN2	(1) No. 18	vs. (3) Bowling Green; Championship	W 87–73	31–3	31 – Harris	10 – Massinburg	4 – Jordan	Quicken Loans Arena (7,813); Cleveland, OH
NCAA tournament
March 22, 2019*; 4:00 pm, TNT	(6 W) No. 15	vs. (11 W) Arizona State; First Round	W 91–74	32–3	21 – Tied	10 – Tied	7 – Jordan	BOK Center (12,352); Tulsa, OK
March 24, 2019*; 6:10 pm, TNT	(6 W) No. 15	vs. (3 W) No. 9 Texas Tech; Second Round	L 58–78	32–4	17 – Perkins	10 – Perkins	5 – Harris	BOK Center (12,606); Tulsa, OK
*Non-conference game. ^{#}Rankings from AP Poll. (#) Tournament seedings in parentheses. All times are in Eastern Time.

== Rankings ==
Ranking movements Legend: ██ Increase in ranking ██ Decrease in ranking RV = Received votes т = Tied with team above or below
	Week																				
Poll	Pre	1	2	3	4	5	6	7	8	9	10	11	12	13	14	15	16	17	18	19	Final
AP	RV	25	22	21	17	14	14	21	20	19	16	14-T	18	23	25	25	21	19	18	15	Not released
Coaches'	RV	RV	25	20	18	15	15	22	20-T	20	17-T	14	17	25	24	24	23	20	16	16	17
