= Leo Richardson =

American basketball and football coach (1931–2023)

Biographical details
- Born: December 19, 1931; Gresham, South Carolina, U.S.
- Died: July 23, 2023 (aged 91); South Carolina, U.S.

Playing career

Football
- c. 1953: Morris

Basketball
- c. 1953: Morris
- Position: Guard

Coaching career (HC unless noted)

Football
- 1961–1963: Morris
- 1964–1968: Savannah State

Basketball
- 1964–1971: Savannah State
- 1973–1978: Buffalo

Head coaching record
- Overall: 28–38–4 (football)

Accomplishments and honors

Awards
- SIAC Basketball Coach of the Year (1970); Savannah State University Sports Hall of Fame inductee (2010)

Leo Richardson (December 19, 1931 – July 23, 2023) was an American basketball and football coach. Richardson was the head basketball coach at Savannah State University from 1964 to 1971, and the University at Buffalo from 1973 to 1978. He compiled an overall basketball coaching record of 146–176. Richardson led the Savannah State basketball team to a Southern Intercollegiate Athletic Conference conference tournament title in 1970, for which he was named coach of the year. He was the University at Buffalo's first African American head basketball coach. He also served as the head football coach at Savannah State from 1964 to 1968, compiling a record of 13–25–2. Richardson was elected to the Savannah State University Sports Hall of Fame in 2010.

Richardson was born in Gresham, South Carolina and attended elementary and high school in Loris, South Carolina. He played football and basketball at Morris College in Sumter, South Carolina before graduating in 1954. Richardson then coached football and basketball at A. L. Corbett High School in Wagener, South Carolina. Richardson earned a master's degree from the Tuskegee Institute—now known as Tuskegee University—in 1961. Richardson died in South Carolina on July 23, 2023, at the age of 91.

== Head coaching record ==
=== Football ===
Year	Team	Overall	Conference	Standing	Bowl/playoffs
Morris Hornets (Southeastern Athletic Conference) (1961–1963)
1961	Morris	3–5–2	1–3–1	5th	
1962	Morris	5–5			
1963	Morris	7–3			
Morris:		15–13–2			
Savannah State Tigers (NCAA College Division independent) (1964–1968)
1964	Savannah State	1–6			
1965	Savannah State	1–6–1			
1966	Savannah State	3–5			
1967	Savannah State	6–2–1			
1968	Savannah State	2–6			
Savannah State:		13–25–2			
Total:		28–38–4			

=== Basketball ===
Record table
Season	Team	Overall	Conference	Standing	Postseason
Savannah State Tigers (NCAA College Division independent) (1964–1969)
1964–65	Savannah State	9–20			
1965–66	Savannah State	17–6			
1966–67	Savannah State	15–13			
1967–68	Savannah State	20–9			
1968–69	Savannah State	15–16			
Savannah State Tigers (Southern Intercollegiate Athletic Conference) (1969–1971)
1969–70	Savannah State	18–9			
1970–71	Savannah State	18–11			
Savannah State:		112–84 (.571)			
Buffalo Bulls (NCAA Division I independent) (1973–1978)
1973–74	Buffalo	5–20			
1974–75	Buffalo	8–17			
1975–76	Buffalo	10–16			
1976–77	Buffalo	5–21			
1977–78	Buffalo	6–18			
Buffalo:		34–92 (.270)			
Total:		146–176 (.453)			
National champion Postseason invitational champion Conference regular season champion Conference regular season and conference tournament champion Division regular season champion Division regular season and conference tournament champion Conference tournament champion
