= Tim Cohane =

American basketball coach (born 1942)

Biographical details
- Born: May 22, 1942 (age 84)

Playing career
- 1960s: Navy

Coaching career (HC unless noted)
- 1970–1974: Iona Prep
- 1974–1979: Manhattanville
- 1979–1983: Dartmouth
- 1988–1990: Merchant Marine
- 1993–1999: Buffalo
- 2010–present: Roger Williams (assistant)

Head coaching record
- Overall: 223–236
- Tournaments: 1–5 (NCAA Division III)

Tim Cohane (born May 22, 1942) is an American college basketball coach, Wall Street entrepreneur and sports lawyer.

== Early life ==
Cohane played basketball at Archbishop Stepinac High School in White Plains, New York where he was the basketball captain of the Catholic High School Athletic Association championship in 1960. After high school, Cohane enrolled at College of the Holy Cross on a full basketball scholarship. After his Freshman season, he transferred to the U.S. Naval Academy and played for that school's basketball team. After graduating, Cohane volunteered for duty in Vietnam on the rivers of the Mekong Delta. For his service, he was awarded two Bronze Stars, a Purple Heart and a dozen other commendations. After a year in Vietnam, Cohane was stationed in Naval Station Newport in Rhode Island where he coached a basketball team on-base.

== Coaching career ==
After leaving the service, Cohane spent four years at Iona Preparatory School in New Rochelle, New York where he taught history and coached the boys' basketball team. Cohane was then hired by Manhattanville College which had recently begun accepting male students; he became the first coach of the school's men's basketball team. He led Manhattanville to consecutive appearances in the NCAA Division III men's basketball tournament in his final two seasons with the program.

Cohane was hired away from Manhattanville by Dartmouth College where he admitted he "alienated half the administration" by complaining about recruiting problems. He resigned from the Dartmouth job shortly after the end of the 1982–83 season, his fourth with the school.

After leaving Dartmouth, Cohane was introduced to the trading floor of New York Stock Exchange by a friend. Cohane was hired by Salomon Brothers but later met and befriended Larry Rafferty and together they founded Cohane-Raffertry Securities a firm that became a leader in transactions between banks.>ref. Banking News "Cohane to Don Basketball Shoes". While working on Wall Street, he was hired to fill the coaching vacancy at the U.S. Merchant Marine Academy. He spent two seasons as the unpaid head coach of the Mariners with a record of 45-12 and the school received their first NCAA Bid. Cohane was named New York Metropolitan Coach of the Year."Tim Cohane Terence Cardinal Cooke Humanitarian Award".

Between his first three college head coaching jobs and his stint at the University at Buffalo, Cohane compiled an overall record of 223–236. After rebuilding the Buffalo Program > "UB Awards Contract Extension" Buffalo Sports Information>Cohane resigned as head coach at Buffalo five games into the 1999–2000 season, as a result of an NCAA investigation in which he was alleged to have violated NCAA rules.. In 2004 Cohane filed a long-running lawsuit against the NCAA, the University at Buffalo, and the Mid-American Conference, accusing them of conspiring to remove him as coach and denying Cohane of due process.To facilitate his law suit Cohane, at the age of 65, graduated from Roger Williams School of Law.> "Tim Cohane Terence Cardinal Cooke Humanitarian Award". Among other things, Cohane alleged that the NCAA knew UB officials coerced players into implicating him; he claimed that UB officials threatened to strip Bulls players of their eligibility and block seniors from graduating unless they corroborated claims of violations by Cohane. On May 15, 2015, the United States Court of Appeals for the Second Circuit ruled in favor of the NCAA in the case. Cohane is also a 2005 graduate of the Roger Williams University School of Law, and has developed a law practice specializing in assuring due-process and related protections to coaches and student-athletes alike.

== Head coaching record ==
Record table
Season	Team	Overall	Conference	Standing	Postseason
Manhattanville Valiants () (1974–1979)
1974–75	Manhattanville	9–14			
1975–76	Manhattanville	9–14			
1976–77	Manhattanville	17–9			
1977–78	Manhattanville	17–11			NCAA NCAA Division III Regional Fourth Place
1978–79	Manhattanville	17–11			NCAA NCAA Division III Regional Fourth Place
Manhattanville:		69–59 (.539)			
Dartmouth Big Green (Ivy League) (1979–1983)
1979–80	Dartmouth	6–20	3–11	T–7th	
1980–81	Dartmouth	10–16	3–11	8th	
1981–82	Dartmouth	7–19	1–13	8th	
1982–83	Dartmouth	7–19	3–11	8th	
Dartmouth:		30–74 (.288)	10–46 (.179)		
Merchant Marine Mariners () (1988–1990)
1988–89	Merchant Marine	24–3			NCAA Division III Regional third place
1989–90	Merchant Marine	20–7			
Merchant Marine:		44–10 (.815)			
Buffalo Bulls (East Coast Conference) (1993–1994)
1993–94	Buffalo	10–18	3–2	3rd	
Buffalo:		10–18 (.357)			
Buffalo Bulls (Mid–Continent Conference) (1994–1998)
1994–95	Buffalo	18–10	12–6	3rd	
1995–96	Buffalo	13–14	10–8	T–3rd	
1996–97	Buffalo	17–11	11–5	T–2nd	
1997–98	Buffalo	15–13	9–7	5th	
Buffalo Bulls (Mid–American Conference) (1998–1999)
1998–99	Buffalo	5–24	1–17	7th (East)	
1999–00	Buffalo	2–3	0–0		
Buffalo:		80–93 (.462)	46–45 (.505)		
Total:		223–236 (.442)			
National champion Postseason invitational champion Conference regular season champion Conference regular season and conference tournament champion Division regular season champion Division regular season and conference tournament champion Conference tournament champion
