= Art Powell (coach) =

American sports player and coach (1884–1969)

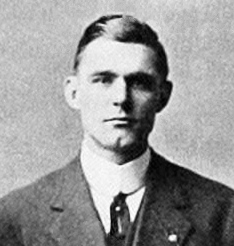

Biographical details
- Born: May 14, 1884; Toronto, Ontario, Canada
- Died: March 10, 1969 (aged 84); Kenmore, New York, U.S.

Playing career

Football
- 1904–1905: Syracuse

Basketball
- 1903–1907: Syracuse
- Positions: Quarterback (football); Center (basketball)

Coaching career (HC unless noted)

Football
- 1916–1921: Buffalo

Basketball
- 1907–1912: Rochester
- 1912–1913: Indiana
- 1915–1943: Buffalo
- 1944–1946: Canisius

Head coaching record
- Overall: 13–22–5 (football); 203–201 (basketball)

Arthur L. Powell (May 14, 1884 – March 10, 1969) was an American college basketball and college football player and coach.

== Early life and playing career ==
Powell was born in Toronto, Ontario in 1884 and was brought to Buffalo, New York as an infant. As a teenager, Powell learned the game of basketball from the Buffalo Germans team. The Germans became the most-feared team in the country, playing against the best pro and amateur teams in the world, and winning with relative ease. In 1961, the Buffalo Germans basketball team was enshrined in the Basketball Hall of Fame.

Following graduation from Masten Park High School in Buffalo, he starred in basketball, baseball and football at Syracuse University in the early 1900s graduating in 1907. Although he was five feet four inches tall, he jumped center for the Syracuse basketball team and was twice named captain. He weighed less than 140 pounds but was the Syracuse football quarterback for three years.

== Coaching career ==
Powell began his basketball coaching career in 1907 at the University of Rochester. His 1909–10 Rochester basketball team finished with 16 wins and 2 losses and made a valid claim as the best Eastern college team.

In 1912, Powell was recruited to Bloomington, Indiana, to serve as the head coach of the Indiana Hoosiers men's basketball team. He stayed just that one season (1912–13) finishing 5–11 and last in the Big Ten Conference.

In 1915, Powell returned to Buffalo, and spent the next 27 years as the head coach of the Buffalo Bisons men's basketball program, from 1915 to 1943. He also coached the Buffalo Bisons football team from 1916 to 1921. As the basketball coach at Buffalo, Powell had a 198–190 record in 28 seasons, including 28 straight wins and a 45–5 record over three seasons (1929–1932), with triumphs over Pittsburgh, West Virginia, Syracuse and Yale. Powell's 1930–31 team was 15–0, the best mark in Buffalo basketball history. However, Powell lost more games in his final decade as coach of Buffalo's basketball team than in his first 18 seasons. His record in his first 18 years at Buffalo was 166–94 (.638) but his record in his final ten seasons was 32–96 (.250).

When the University of Buffalo suspended intercollegiate athletics in 1943 for the duration of World War II, Powell left and coached basketball at Canisius College for two seasons (1944–45 and 1945–46). His top achievement with the Canisius Golden Griffins was a victory over Nat Holman's CCNY team.

== Later years ==
When his career ended, Powell had coached men's basketball for 38+ seasons at the University of Rochester, Indiana University, University of Buffalo and Canisius College. He died in Kenmore, New York at the age of 85 in 1969. In 1984, he was inducted into the University at Buffalo Athletics Hall of Fame.

== Head coaching record ==
=== Football ===
Year	Team	Overall	Conference	Standing	Bowl/playoffs
Buffalo Bisons (Independent) (1916–1921)
1916	Buffalo	3–5–2			
1917	Buffalo	4–4			
1918	Buffalo	6–1			
1919	Buffalo	0–5–1			
1920	Buffalo	1–4			
1921	Buffalo	2–3–2			
Buffalo:		13–22–5			
Total:		13–22–5			

=== Basketball ===
Record table
Season	Team	Overall	Conference	Standing	Postseason
Indiana Hoosiers (Big Ten Conference) (1912–1913)
1912–13	Indiana	5–11	0–10	9th	
Indiana:		5–11 (.313)	0–10		
Buffalo Bisons (Independent) (1915–1943)
1915–16	Buffalo	7–4			
1916–17	Buffalo	6–8			
1917–18	Buffalo	6–2			
1918–19	Buffalo	8–5			
1919–20	Buffalo	9–1			
1920–21	Buffalo	12–6			
1921–22	Buffalo	5–7			
1922–23	Buffalo	7–5			
1923–24	Buffalo	7–6			
1924–25	Buffalo	7–6			
1925–26	Buffalo	11–6			
1926–27	Buffalo	11–4			
1927–28	Buffalo	8–8			
1928–29	Buffalo	7–11			
1929–30	Buffalo	15–1			
1930–31	Buffalo	15–0			
1931–32	Buffalo	15–4			
1932–33	Buffalo	10–9			
1933–34	Buffalo	5–10			
1934–35	Buffalo	3–9			
1935–36	Buffalo	0–13			
1936–37	Buffalo	4–10			
1937–38	Buffalo	4–9			
1938–39	Buffalo	2–12			
1939–40	Buffalo	1–10			
1940–41	Buffalo	4–9			
1941–42	Buffalo	2–8			
1942–43	Buffalo	7–6			
Buffalo:		198–190 (.510)			
Total:					
