= Alfred Saxons =

Athletics programs of Alfred University

- University: Alfred University
- Association: Division III
- Conference: Empire 8
- Athletic director: Paul Vecchio
- Location: Alfred, New York
- Varsity teams: 21
- Football stadium: Yunevich Stadium
- Arena: Terry S. Galanis Family Arena
- Nickname: Saxons
- Colors: Purple and Gold
- Website: gosaxons.com

The Alfred Saxons are composed of 21 teams representing Alfred University in intercollegiate athletics, including men and women's alpine skiing, basketball, cross country, equestrian, lacrosse, soccer, swimming & diving, tennis, and track and field. Men's sports include football. Women's sports include softball and volleyball. The Saxons compete in the NCAA Division III and are members of the Empire 8 for all sports except for alpine skiing, which is governed by the USCSA, and the equestrian team, which is governed by the IHSA.

== Teams ==
Men's sports	Women's sports
Alpine Skiing	Alpine Skiing
Basketball	Basketball
Cross Country	Cross Country
Football	Lacrosse
Lacrosse	Soccer
Soccer	Softball
Swimming & Diving	Swimming & Diving
Tennis	Tennis
Track and Field	Track and Field
Baseball	Volleyball
Co-ed sports
Hunt seat equestrian
Western Equestrian

== Baseball ==
Alfred has had five Major League Baseball draft selections since the draft began in 1965.

Year	Player	Round	Team
1970	David Wisniewski	4	Senators
1984	Jovon Edwards	4	Dodgers
1988	Greg Prusia	36	Royals
1997	Geronimo Cruz	17	Rangers
2000	Andy Hutchings	27	Astros
