= Jordan Schakel =

American basketball player (born 1998)

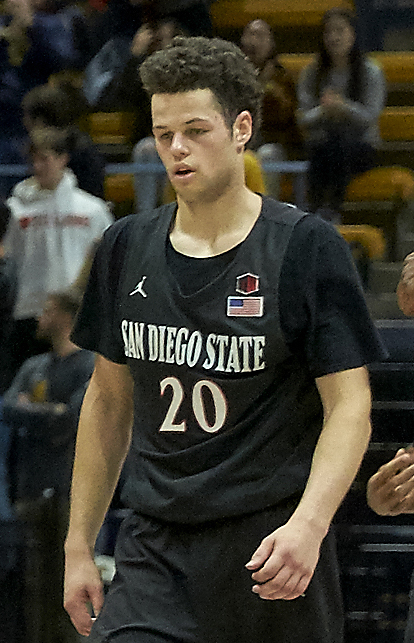
- Schakel with San Diego State in 2018

No. 8 – Valley Suns
- Position: Shooting guard / small forward
- League: NBA G League

Personal information
- Born: June 13, 1998 (age 28) Torrance, California, U.S.
- Listed height: 6 ft 6 in (1.98 m)
- Listed weight: 200 lb (91 kg)

Career information
- High school: Bishop Montgomery (Torrance, California)
- College: San Diego State (2017–2021)
- NBA draft: 2021: undrafted
- Playing career: 2021–present

Career history
- 2021–2022: Capital City Go-Go
- 2021–2022: Washington Wizards
- 2022–2023: Capital City Go-Go
- 2023: Santa Cruz Warriors
- 2023–2025: Maine Celtics
- 2024: Leones de Ponce
- 2025: Filou Oostende
- 2025–2026: Niners Chemnitz
- 2026–present: Valley Suns

Career highlights
- Second-team All-Mountain West (2021)
- Stats at NBA.com
- Stats at Basketball Reference

Jordan Schakel (born June 13, 1998) is an American professional basketball player for the Valley Suns of the NBA G League. He played college basketball for the San Diego State Aztecs. For his college career, Schakel scored 225 field goals from behind the 3-point line, ranking third in SDSU's history, and ended his college career with a total 1,034 points. He averaged 42.7% from behind the three-point line and 46.1% during his final year, ranking third nationally in the 2020–21 season. Schakel graduated with a degree in marketing from the SDSU Fowler College of Business and was named a Scholar Athlete in each semester.

Before joining the Aztecs, Schakel graduated from Bishop Montgomery High School in Torrance, California. In high school, he was part of the team that won the state's Division IV Championship of California Interscholastic Federation in his freshman year and, as a senior, helped his team win the Open Division Championship, the top high school basketball title in California. Schakel was ranked by ESPN as a 4-star recruit of the class of 2017 and was named to the first-team All-CIF, All-Del Rey League, and All-CIF Southern Section Open Division, and the Daily Breeze's All-Area First Team.

== Early life ==
Schakel was born on June 13, 1998, in Torrance, California. He began playing football and basketball at an early age. In third grade, he played in a local 3-on-3 basketball tournament in Long Beach, California.

== High school career ==
As a freshman on the Bishop Montgomery High School basketball team, Schakel played in the CIF State Division IV Championship. As a sophomore, his team instead took part in the top Open Division championships. In Spring 2015 postseason, they made it as far as to win the Southern Section championship game over Etiwanda High School in which Schakel scored nineteen points, ten of which in a single quarter. He has played on the Bishop Montgomery basketball team for all four years of his high school career. In December 2015, Schakel was named MVP of the Mission Prep Christmas Classic in which his team was tournament champions. He is notable for his three-point shooting prowess, scoring 81 three-pointers in 2016.

During the 2017 season, Schakel led his team during the CIF Southern Section Open Division semifinals win over No. 1-seed Sierra Canyon. In this game on February 24, 2017, he scored 20 points in the 70–63 upset which included a game-changing series of three consecutive three-point field goals. Schakel broke his high school's record for most career wins.

He also played an important part in his team winning the championship in the state's top division. On March 25, 2017, Schakel scored twenty points with four three-pointers in Bishop Montgomery's 74–67 win over Woodcreek High School to become CIF State Open Division champions. He led the team in rebounds in 2017 and finished his career with a program-record 118 wins. Schakel was named to the first-team All-CIF, All-Del Rey League, and All-CIF Southern Section Open Division, and the Daily Breeze's All-Area First Team. He graduated from high school with a 4.2 grade point average.

=== Recruiting ===
In July 2016, Schakel announced his commitment to attend San Diego State University (SDSU) beginning in fall 2017. In doing so, he turned down offers from USC, where both his parents attended college, as well as Stanford University, Rice University and the University of California, Berkeley. In November 2016, he affirmed his commitment in writing.

College recruiting
| Name | Hometown | School | Height | Weight | Commit date |
|---|---|---|---|---|---|
| Jordan Schakel; SF | Torrance, CA | Bishop Montgomery (CA) | 6 ft 6 in (1.98 m) | 188 lb (85 kg) | Jul 20, 2016 |
| Jordan Schakel; SF | Recruit ratings: Scout: Rivals: 247Sports: ESPN: (81) | | | | |
Overall recruit ranking:
Note: In many cases, Scout, Rivals, 247Sports, On3, and ESPN may conflict in their listings of height and weight.; In these cases, the average was taken. ESPN grades are on a 100-point scale.; Sources: "2017 San Diego State Basketball Commitment List". Rivals.; "2017 San Diego State Aztecs Recruiting Class". ESPN.; "2017 Team Ranking". Rivals.

== College career ==
In 2017–18 season with the San Diego State Aztecs men's basketball team, Schakel participated in 33 games averaging 14 minutes per game. The freshman scored 106 points, with 12 steals, 19 assists, 27 three-pointers, and only 9 turnovers in 455 minutes of playing time for the season. After winning the Mountain West Conference tournament, his team qualified as 11 seed at the 2018 NCAA tournament but lost in the first round to the sixth-seeded, 21st-ranked Houston Cougars 67–65.

As a sophomore in the 2018–19 season, Schakel started in 16 of the 28 games in which he participated, averaging 23.3 minutes per game. He scored 207 points, with 22 steals, 30 assists, 44 three-pointers, and only 15 turnovers in 651 minutes of playing time for the season. The team made it to the final game of the 2019 Mountain West Conference tournament but lost to Utah State and failed to qualify for the NCAA tournament.

As a junior in the 2019–20 season, Schakel became a regular starter, averaging 10 points and 3.4 rebounds per game. He started in 31 of the 32 games he participated in and recorded 27 steals, 18 assists, 2 blocks, and only 17 turnovers in 850 minutes of playing time. On February 12, 2020, SDSU clinched the Mountain West Conference regular-season title. The Aztecs only lost a single game in the regular season. The team had its second loss in the finals of the 2020 Mountain West Conference tournament and were projected to be a top seed in the NCAA tournament before it was cancelled due to the COVID-19 pandemic.

In 2020–21 season, Schakel scored on 46.11 percent of his 3-pointer attempts, ranking third in the nation. He was twice named Mountain West Conference's Player of the Week during the season. On January 4, 2021, Schakel recorded 28 points and nine rebounds in a 78–65 win over Colorado State. He made eight three-pointers, the second-most in a game in program history. On March 3, 2021, SDSU clinched the Mountain West Conference regular-season title for the second year in row. At the 2021 Mountain West Conference tournament, the team beat Utah State 68–57 to win the conference tournament championship, with Schakel named to the All-Tournament Team. The Aztecs were seeded 6th in the 2021 NCAA tournament but lost in the first round to 11-seed Syracuse Orange.

Throughout his college career, Schakel scored 225 field goals from behind the 3-point line, ranking third in SDSU's history, and ended his college career with a total 1,034 points. He finished his career as SDSU's all-time leader in career free-throw percentage at 87 percent. San Diego State announced that Schakel will participate in the State Farm College 3-point Championships. A few hours later, Schakel announced he would pursue a professional career by entering the 2021 NBA draft. He graduated with a degree in marketing from the SDSU Fowler College of Business and was named a Scholar Athlete in each semester of college.

== Professional career ==
=== Washington Wizards / Capital City Go-Go (2021–2023) ===
After going undrafted in the 2021 NBA draft, Schakel joined the Golden State Warriors for the 2021 NBA Summer League and later joined the Sacramento Kings in the Las Vegas Summer League. The Kings, including Schakel, won the Summer League Championship in 2021. On September 21, 2021, he signed with the Washington Wizards. However, he was waived by the Wizards on October 13. Thirteen days later, Schakel joined the Capital City Go-Go as an affiliate player. In 14 games, he averaged 13.8 points and 3.2 rebounds per game while shooting .396 from three-point range. He led the NBA G League in made threes during that stretch with 44.

On December 22, 2021, Schakel signed a 10-day contract with the Washington Wizards. On January 1, 2022, Schakel was reacquired and activated by the Capital City Go-Go after his 10-day contract expired.

On March 9, 2022, Schakel signed a two-way contract with the Washington Wizards. He appeared in 4 games for the Washington Wizards during the 2021–22 NBA season.

On November 20, 2022, Schakel was waived by the Wizards. On November 23, he was reacquired by the Capital City Go-Go.

=== Santa Cruz Warriors (2023) ===
On January 11, 2023, Schakel was traded to the Santa Cruz Warriors.

=== Maine Celtics and Leones de Ponce (2023–2025) ===
On September 27, 2023, Schakel signed with the Boston Celtics, but was waived the next day. On October 28, he joined the Maine Celtics.

On July 17, 2024, Schakel signed with the Leones de Ponce of the Baloncesto Superior Nacional.

On September 11, 2024, Schakel signed with the Boston Celtics, but was waived two days later. On October 18, he re-signed with Boston, but was waived the next day and on October 26, he re-joined the Maine Celtics.

=== Filou Oostende (2025) ===
For the 2025–26 season Schakel signed with Filou Oostende of Belgian BNXT League and the Champions League. On December 3, 2025, he left the team after playing in four games. He averaged 5.8 points and 1.8 rebounds. He also played 9 games in the BNXT League where he had 10 points per game and 2.1 rebounds per game.

=== Niners Chemnitz (2025–2026) ===
On December 20, 2025, Schakel signed with Niners Chemnitz of German Basketball Bundesliga (BBL).

=== Valley Suns (2026–present) ===
On September 16, 2026, Schakel signed an Exhibit 10 contract with the Phoenix Suns, but was waived by the team the following day.

== Career statistics ==
Legend
| GP | Games played | GS | Games started | MPG | Minutes per game |
| FG% | Field goal percentage | 3P% | 3-point field goal percentage | FT% | Free throw percentage |
| RPG | Rebounds per game | APG | Assists per game | SPG | Steals per game |
| BPG | Blocks per game | PPG | Points per game | **Bold** | Career high |

=== NBA ===
| Year | Team | GP | GS | MPG | FG% | 3P% | FT% | RPG | APG | SPG | BPG | PPG |
|---|---|---|---|---|---|---|---|---|---|---|---|---|
| 2021–22 | Washington | **4** | 0 | **7.5** | .091 | .167 | 1.000 | **2.0** | .0 | .3 | .0 | 1.3 |
| 2022–23 | Washington | 2 | 0 | 3.0 | **.500** | **1.000** | – | .0 | **.5** | **.5** | .0 | **1.5** |
| Career | | 6 | 0 | 6.0 | .154 | .286 | 1.000 | 1.3 | .2 | .3 | .0 | 1.3 |

=== College ===
| Year | Team | GP | GS | MPG | FG% | 3P% | FT% | RPG | APG | SPG | BPG | PPG |
|---|---|---|---|---|---|---|---|---|---|---|---|---|
| 2017–18 | San Diego State | **33** | 0 | 13.8 | .330 | .346 | .684 | 2.1 | .6 | .4 | **.1** | 3.2 |
| 2018–19 | San Diego State | 28 | 16 | 23.3 | .447 | .415 | .841 | 3.6 | **1.1** | .8 | **.1** | 7.4 |
| 2019–20 | San Diego State | 32 | **31** | 26.5 | .453 | .436 | **.927** | 3.4 | .6 | .8 | **.1** | 10.0 |
| 2020–21 | San Diego State | 28 | 27 | **29.2** | **.473** | **.461** | .908 | **4.4** | 1.0 | **1.0** | **.1** | **14.4** |
| Career | | 121 | 74 | 22.9 | .443 | .427 | .870 | 3.3 | .8 | .7 | .1 | 8.5 |

== Personal life ==
Schakel's mother, Dr. Stefanie Bodison, is a former All-American volleyball player at USC and an assistant professor at the University of Florida.

Schakel holds a German passport.
