= 2017–18 Air Force Falcons men's basketball team =

American college basketball season

2017–18 Air Force Falcons men's basketball
- Conference: Mountain West Conference
- Record: 12–19 (6–12 MW)
- Head coach: Dave Pilipovich (6th season)
- Assistant coaches: Kurt Kanaskie; Andrew Moore; Nate Zandt; Evan Washington
- Home arena: Clune Arena

2017–18 Mountain West Conference men's basketball standings
	Conf.				Overall
Team	W		L	PCT	W		L	PCT
No. 24 Nevada	15	–	3	.833	29	–	8	.784
Boise State	13	–	5	.722	23	–	9	.719
New Mexico	12	–	6	.667	19	–	15	.559
Fresno State	11	–	7	.611	21	–	11	.656
San Diego State †	11	–	7	.611	22	–	11	.667
Wyoming	10	–	8	.556	20	–	13	.606
UNLV	8	–	10	.444	20	–	13	.606
Utah State	8	–	10	.444	17	–	17	.500
Air Force	6	–	12	.333	12	–	19	.387
Colorado State	4	–	14	.222	11	–	21	.344
San Jose State	1	–	17	.056	4	–	26	.133
† Conference tournament winner Rankings from AP poll

The 2017–18 Air Force Falcons men's basketball team represented the United States Air Force Academy during the 2017–18 NCAA Division I men's basketball season. The Falcons, led by sixth-year head coach Dave Pilipovich, played their home games at Clune Arena on the Air Force Academy's main campus in Colorado Springs, Colorado. They finished the season 12–19, with a 6–12 record in Mountain West play. Air Force finished with the ninth-best in-conference record. They lost in the first round of the Mountain West tournament to UNLV.

== Previous season ==
The Falcons finished the season 12–21, 4–14 in Mountain West play to finish in a tie for tenth place. They defeated Wyoming in the first round of the Mountain West tournament to advance to the quarterfinals where they lost to Colorado State.

== Offseason ==
=== Departures ===
Name	Number	Pos.	Height	Weight	Year	Hometown	Notes
Daniel Hummer	4	G	6'0"	175	Sophomore	Upper Arlington, OH	Transferred to Ohio State
Zach Kocur	5	G	6'3"	200	Senior	Denver, CO	Graduated
Nicholas Wells	10	G	6'5"	194	Freshman	Marietta, GA	No longer on team roster
Kyle Broekhuis	25	F	6'7"	200	Senior	Colorado Springs, CO	Graduated
Garrett Scheer	31	F	6'6"	185	Freshman	Las Vegas, NV	No longer on team roster
Hayden Graham	35	F	6'5"	195	Senior	Austin, TX	Graduated
Brendan Leonard	40	C	6'8"	235	Junior	Olympia, WA	No longer on team roster
Keegan Culp	41	F	6'4"	186	Freshman	Carmel, IN	Left the team for personal reasons
Ryan Swan	43	F	6'6"	227	Freshman	Aurora, CO	No longer on team roster

=== 2017 recruiting class ===
College recruiting information
Name	Hometown	School	Height	Weight	Commit date
Jeff Fesperman; SG	San Antonio, TX	Churchill High School	6 ft 3 in (1.91 m)	190 lb (86 kg)	
Jeff Fesperman; SG	Recruit ratings: Scout: Rivals: (N/A)				
Abraham Kinrade; SF	Maquoketa, IA	Maquoketa High School	6 ft 6 in (1.98 m)	175 lb (79 kg)	Sep 13, 2016
Abraham Kinrade; SF	Recruit ratings: Scout: Rivals: (N/A)				
A.J. Walker; SG	San Angelo, TX	St. Mary's Hall	6 ft 3 in (1.91 m)	N/A	Sep 27, 2016
A.J. Walker; SG	Recruit ratings: Scout: Rivals: (N/A)				
Charlie O'Briant; PF	Atlanta, GA	Greater Atlanta Christian School	6 ft 8 in (2.03 m)	200 lb (91 kg)	Oct 3, 2016
Charlie O'Briant; PF	Recruit ratings: Scout: Rivals: (N/A)				
Zach Couper; SG	Rockford, IL	Boylan Central Catholic High School	6 ft 4 in (1.93 m)	200 lb (91 kg)	Oct 24, 2016
Zach Couper; SG	Recruit ratings: Scout: Rivals: (N/A)				
Overall recruit ranking: Scout: – Rivals: –
Note: In many cases, Scout, Rivals, 247Sports, On3, and ESPN may conflict in their listings of height and weight.; In these cases, the average was taken. ESPN grades are on a 100-point scale.; Sources: "2017 Team Ranking". Rivals.

== Preseason ==
In a vote by conference media at the Mountain West media day, the Falcons were picked to finish in last place in the Mountain West.

== Roster ==
2017–18 Air Force Falcons men's basketball team
Players
Coaches

Pos.	#	Name	Height	Weight	Year	Previous school	Hometown
G	0	Caleb Morris	6 ft 4 in (1.93 m)	185 lb (84 kg)	So	Army and Navy Academy	Vista, CA
F	1	Dane Norman	6 ft 9 in (2.06 m)	190 lb (86 kg)	Jr	Foothills Christian High School	San Diego, CA
G	2	C. J. Siples	6 ft 3 in (1.91 m)	175 lb (79 kg)	Sr	USAFA Prep School	Cibolo, TX
G	3	Sid Tomes	6 ft 4 in (1.93 m)	200 lb (91 kg)	So	East Ridge	Woodbury, MN
G	5	Christopher Joyce	6 ft 6 in (1.98 m)	196 lb (89 kg)	Fr	Bishop Kenny	Jacksonville, FL
F	11	Ameka Akaya	6 ft 6 in (1.98 m)	215 lb (98 kg)	Fr	St. Maria Goretti	Hagerstown, MD
F	12	Lavelle Scottie	6 ft 6 in (1.98 m)	200 lb (91 kg)	So	Arlington Heights	Fort Worth, TX
G	13	LeSean Brown	6 ft 2 in (1.88 m)	185 lb (84 kg)	So	TMI Episcopal	San Antonio, TX
G	15	Jacob Van	6 ft 1 in (1.85 m)	175 lb (79 kg)	Sr	Mansfield Lake Ridge	Mansfield, TX
G	20	Trevor Lyons	6 ft 3 in (1.91 m)	190 lb (86 kg)	Sr	USAFA Prep School	Newport News, VA
F	21	Javen Gumber	6 ft 8 in (2.03 m)	200 lb (91 kg)	Fr	Fruita Monument	Craig, CO
G	22	Pervis Louder	6 ft 4 in (1.93 m)	187 lb (85 kg)	Jr	Village Christian Academy	Raleigh, NC
G	23	Kobi Betts	6 ft 3 in (1.91 m)	190 lb (86 kg)	So	Central	Pueblo, CO
G	24	Charles O'Briant	6 ft 8 in (2.03 m)	200 lb (91 kg)	Fr	Greater Atlanta Christian	Johns Creek, GA
G	25	Bryce Hughes	6 ft 3 in (1.91 m)	190 lb (86 kg)	Fr	Lady Bird Johnson	San Antonio, TX
F	30	Jonathan DeWane	6 ft 8 in (2.03 m)	205 lb (93 kg)	So	Bolles	Jacksonville, FL
F	32	Ryan Manning	6 ft 6 in (1.98 m)	200 lb (91 kg)	Sr	USAFA Prep School	Sacramento, CA
C	33	Frank Toohey	6 ft 7 in (2.01 m)	220 lb (100 kg)	Sr	York Community	Elmhurst, IL
F	35	James Edwards	6 ft 0 in (1.83 m)	165 lb (75 kg)	Fr	Plum	Allison Park, PA
C	40	Kole Cerjan	6 ft 7 in (2.01 m)	210 lb (95 kg)	Fr	Rampart	Colorado Springs, CO
F	41	Peyton Spires	6 ft 7 in (2.01 m)	225 lb (102 kg)	Fr	St. Paul's Episcopal	Mobile, AL
G	44	Keaton Van Soelen	6 ft 7 in (2.01 m)	190 lb (86 kg)	Fr	Des Moines Christian	Waukee, IA

Head coach

- Dave Pilipovich (Thiel)

Assistant coach(es)

- Kurt Kanaskie (La Salle)
- Andy Moore (Muskingum)
- Nate Zandt (Michigan)
- Evan Washington (Air Force)

Legend

- (C) Team captain
- (S) Suspended
- (I) Ineligible
- (W) Walk-on
- Injured
- Current redshirt

Roster
Last update: 10/2/2017

== Schedule and results ==
Date time, TV	Rank^{#}	Opponent^{#}	Result	Record	Site (attendance) city, state
Exhibition
Nov 7, 2017*; 7:00 pm		Colorado Christian	W 97–74		Clune Arena; Colorado Springs, CO
Non-conference regular season
Nov 12, 2017*; 2:00 pm, ESPN3		Texas State; Men Against Breast Cancer Showcase	W 65–57	1–0	Clune Arena (1,511); Colorado Springs, CO
Nov 14, 2017*; 5:00 pm		Canisius; Men Against Breast Cancer Showcase	W 93–79	2–0	Clune Arena (1,002); Colorado Springs, CO
Nov 20, 2017*; 7:00 pm		Arkansas–Pine Bluff; Men Against Breast Cancer Showcase	W 57–47	3–0	Clune Arena (1,355); Colorado Springs, CO
Nov 21, 2017*; 7:00 pm		Pacific; Men Against Breast Cancer Showcase	L 71–83	3–1	Clune Arena (1,510); Colorado Springs, CO
Nov 26, 2017*; 2:00 pm, P12N		at Colorado	L 69–81	3–2	Coors Events Center (7,427); Boulder, CO
Nov 29, 2017*; 5:00 pm, ESPN3		at Indiana State; MW–MVC Challenge	L 64–74	3–3	Hulman Center (3,797); Terre Haute, IN
Dec 2, 2017*; 1:00 pm		at Denver	W 61–59	4–3	Magness Arena (1,401); Denver, CO
Dec 4, 2017*; 7:00 pm		Western State (CO)	W 79–67	5–3	Clune Arena (1,535); Colorado Springs, CO
Dec 6, 2017*; 7:00 pm		Abilene Christian	L 58–62	5–4	Clune Arena (1,602); Colorado Springs, CO
Dec 8, 2017*; 8:00 pm		at UC Riverside	L 48–67	5–5	SRC Arena (899); Riverside, CA
Dec 17, 2017*; 11:30 am		vs. Army; Madison Square Garden Holiday Festival	L 54–79	5–6	Madison Square Garden (9,515); New York City, NY
Dec 22, 2017*; 2:00 pm		Johnson & Wales (CO)	W 111–68	6–6	Clune Arena (1,818); Colorado Springs, CO
Mountain West regular season
Dec 27, 2017; 7:00 pm, ATTSNRM		at New Mexico	L 58–87	6–7 (0–1)	The Pit (10,514); Albuquerque, NM
Dec 30, 2017; 5:00 pm		at Fresno State	L 59–71	6–8 (0–2)	Save Mart Center (6,188); Fresno, CA
Jan 6, 2018; 12:00 pm, ATTSNRM		Nevada	L 75–86	6–9 (0–3)	Clune Arena (2,254); Colorado Springs, CO
Jan 10, 2018; 8:00 pm, ATTSNRM		UNLV	L 76–81	6–10 (0–4)	Clune Arena (1,911); Colorado Springs, CO
Jan 13, 2018; 3:00 pm		at San Jose State	W 78–71	7–10 (1–4)	Event Center Arena (1,405); San Jose, CA
Jan 17, 2018; 7:00 pm, ATTSNRM		at Colorado State	W 76–71	8–10 (2–4)	Moby Arena (3,216); Fort Collins, CO
Jan 20, 2018; 2:00 pm, ATTSNRM		Fresno State	Postponed^{1}		Clune Arena; Colorado Springs, CO
Jan 24, 2018; 7:00 pm		at Utah State	L 49–71	8–11 (2–5)	Smith Spectrum (6,974); Logan, UT
Jan 27, 2018; 8:00 pm, ESPNU		Boise State	L 64–70	8–12 (2–6)	Clune Arena (2,436); Colorado Springs, CO
Feb 3, 2018; 8:00 pm, ESPN3		at San Diego State	L 51–80	8–13 (2–7)	Viejas Arena (11,482); San Diego, CA
Feb 6, 2018; 8:00 pm, ATTSNRM		Colorado State	W 78–73	9–13 (3–7)	Clune Arena (2,556); Colorado Springs, CO
Feb 10, 2018; 2:00 pm, ESPN3		New Mexico	W 100–92	10–13 (4–7)	Clune Arena (2,851); Colorado Springs, CO
Feb 14, 2018; 8:00 pm, ATTSNRM		at UNLV	L 73–81	10–14 (4–8)	Thomas & Mack Center (9,027); Paradise, NV
Feb 17, 2018; 7:00 pm, ATTSNRM		at Boise State	L 52–76	10–15 (4–9)	Taco Bell Arena (7,530); Boise, ID
Feb 21, 2018; 8:30 pm, CBSSN		San Diego State	L 56–67	10–16 (4–10)	Clune Arena (1,868); Colorado Springs, CO
Feb 24, 2018; 2:00 pm		Utah State	W 75–65	11–16 (5–10)	Clune Arena (3,267); Colorado Springs, CO
Feb 26, 2018; 7:00 pm, ATTSNRM		Fresno State	L 48–54	11–17 (5–11)	Clune Arena (2,150); Colorado Springs, CO
Feb 28, 2018; 7:00 pm		at Wyoming	L 54–66	11–18 (5–12)	Arena-Auditorium (5,731); Laramie, WY
Mar 3, 2018; 2:00 pm		San Jose State	W 83–61	12–18 (6–12)	Clune Arena (3,018); Colorado Springs, CO
Mountain West tournament
Mar 7, 2018; 12:00 pm, Stadium	(9)	at (8) UNLV; First round	L 90–97 ^{OT}	12–19	Thomas & Mack Center (4,994); Paradise, NV
*Non-conference game. ^{#}Rankings from AP Poll. (#) Tournament seedings in parentheses. All times are in Mountain Time.

- ^{1} Game originally canceled due to the January 2018 United States federal government shutdown. Rescheduled to February 26.
