= 2017–18 Colorado State Rams men's basketball team =

American college basketball season

2017–18 Colorado State Rams men's basketball
- Conference: Mountain West Conference
- Record: 11–21 (4–14 MW)
- Head coach: Larry Eustachy (First 24 games); Steve Barnes (interim, 2 games); Jase Herl (interim, final 6 games)
- Assistant coach: Willie Glover
- Home arena: Moby Arena

2017–18 Mountain West Conference men's basketball standings
	Conf.				Overall
Team	W		L	PCT	W		L	PCT
No. 24 Nevada	15	–	3	.833	29	–	8	.784
Boise State	13	–	5	.722	23	–	9	.719
New Mexico	12	–	6	.667	19	–	15	.559
Fresno State	11	–	7	.611	21	–	11	.656
San Diego State †	11	–	7	.611	22	–	11	.667
Wyoming	10	–	8	.556	20	–	13	.606
UNLV	8	–	10	.444	20	–	13	.606
Utah State	8	–	10	.444	17	–	17	.500
Air Force	6	–	12	.333	12	–	19	.387
Colorado State	4	–	14	.222	11	–	21	.344
San Jose State	1	–	17	.056	4	–	26	.133
† Conference tournament winner Rankings from AP poll

The 2017–18 Colorado State Rams men's basketball team represented Colorado State University during the 2017–18 NCAA Division I men's basketball season. The team was coached by Larry Eustachy in his sixth season. The Rams played their home games at Moby Arena on CSU's main campus in Fort Collins, Colorado as members of the Mountain West Conference.

On February 3, 2018, prior to their game against Nevada, Eustachy was placed on administrative leave amid an internal investigation by Colorado State of Eustachy's conduct with players and other staff members. Eustachy had previously been reprimanded by the university in 2017 for the same type of behavior from a 2014 university led investigation. On February 8, players boycotted practice because of the lack of communication from the athletic department as to the situation. On the same day, it was reported that Eustachy would be fired by the school.

The Rams were initially led by assistant coach Steve Barnes for the first 2 games of Eustachy's absence. However, prior to the team's home game against San Jose State on February 10, he was also placed on administrative leave. Assistant coach Jase Herl took over as interim head coach for the rest of the season.

On February 26, Eustachy officially resigned from Colorado State.

The Rams finished the season 11–21, 4–14 in Mountain West play to finish in tenth place. They lost in the first round of the Mountain West tournament to Utah State.

On March 22, Drake head coach and former CSU assistant coach Niko Medved was hired as the new head coach of the Rams.

== Previous season ==
The Rams finished the 2016–17 season 24–12, 13–5 in Mountain West play to finish in second place. They defeated Air Force and San Diego State to advance to the championship game of the Mountain West tournament where they lost to Nevada. They were invited to the 2017 National Invitation Tournament where they defeated the College of Charleston in the first round before losing in the second round to Cal State Bakersfield.

== Offseason ==
=== Departures ===
Name	Number	Pos.	Height	Weight	Year	Hometown	Reason for departure
Kimani Jackson	0	F	6'8"	223	RS Junior	Arlington, TX	Graduate transferred to Nicholls State
Devocio Butler	1	G	6'5"	205	Junior	Atlanta, GA	Transferred to Texas Southern
Emmanuel Omogbo	2	F	6'8"	210	Senior	Hyattsville, MD	Graduated
Gian Clavell	3	G	6'4"	185	RS Senior	Caguas, PR	Graduated
Kevin Little	4	G	6'0"	160	Junior	Wyandanch, NY	Transferred to UT Martin
Kevin Dorsey	5	G	6'0"	175	Sophomore	Waldorf, MD	Transferred to Indian Hills CC
Alex Tarkanian	12	G	5'11"	167	RS Freshman	Las Vegas, NV	Walk-on; didn't return
Braiden Koelliker	33	F/C	6'8"	225	Sophomore	Kaysville, UT	Transferred to Chaminade

=== Incoming transfers ===
Name	Number	Pos.	Height	Weight	Year	Hometown	Previous School
Alonzo Tyson	0	F	6'8"	190	Junior	Fayetteville, NC	Junior college transferred from Cape Fear CC
Raquan Mitchell	3	G	6'2"		RS Sophomore	Miami, FL	Junior college transferred from South Plains College
Deion James	20	F	6'8"	195	Junior	Tucson, AZ	Junior college transferred from Pima CC
Kris Martin	30	G	6'6"	186	Junior	Frisco, TX	Transferred from Oral Roberts. Under NCAA transfer rules, Martin will have to sit out for the 2017–18 season. Will have two years of remaining eligibility.

=== 2017 recruiting class ===
College recruiting information
Name	Hometown	School	Height	Weight	Commit date
Logan Ryan; PF	Canton, MI	International Sports Academy of Naples	6 ft 8 in (2.03 m)	225 lb (102 kg)	
Logan Ryan; PF	Recruit ratings: Scout: Rivals: ESPN:				
Overall recruit ranking: Scout: – Rivals: –
Note: In many cases, Scout, Rivals, 247Sports, On3, and ESPN may conflict in their listings of height and weight.; In these cases, the average was taken. ESPN grades are on a 100-point scale.; Sources: "Colorado State Commit List for 2017". Rivals.; "Men's Basketball Recruiting". Scout.; "ESPN – Colorado State Rams Basketball Recruiting 2017". ESPN.; "Scout.com Team Recruiting Rankings". Scout.; "2017 Team Ranking". Rivals.

== Preseason ==
In a vote by conference media at the Mountain West media day, the Rams were picked to finish in fifth place in the Mountain West.

== Roster ==
2017–18 Colorado State Rams men's basketball team
Players
Coaches

Pos.	#	Name	Height	Weight	Year	Previous school	Hometown
F	1	Zo Tyson (redshirt)	6 ft 9 in (2.06 m)	195 lb (88 kg)	Jr	Trinity Christian HS; Cape Fear CC	Fayetteville, NC
G	3	Raquan Mitchell	6 ft 3 in (1.91 m)	185 lb (84 kg)	RS So	Miami Southridge HS; South Plains College	Homestead, FL
G	10	Che Bob	6 ft 6 in (1.98 m)	220 lb (100 kg)	Sr	Kennedy Charter; South Plains College	Charlotte, NC
G	11	Prentiss Nixon	6 ft 1 in (1.85 m)	180 lb (82 kg)	Jr	Bolingbrook HS	Bolingbrook, IL
G	12	Juan Sabino II (W)	5 ft 11 in (1.8 m)	170 lb (77 kg)	RS Fr	Fountain-Fort Carson HS	Fountain, CO
G	13	Lorenzo Jenkins	6 ft 7 in (2.01 m)	210 lb (95 kg)	RS So	First Baptist Academy; Arkansas	Naples, FL
G	14	Robbie Berwick	6 ft 4 in (1.93 m)	195 lb (88 kg)	RS Jr	Atascadero HS; Florida State	Atascadero, CA
G	15	Anthony Bonner	6 ft 2 in (1.88 m)	170 lb (77 kg)	RS So	Lawrence HS	Lawrence, KS
F	20	Deion James	6 ft 8 in (2.03 m)	215 lb (98 kg)	Jr	Empire HS; Pima CC	Tucson, AZ
F	21	Logan Ryan	6 ft 9 in (2.06 m)	—	Fr	International Sports Academy	Plymouth, MI
G	22	J. D. Page	6 ft 3 in (1.91 m)	166 lb (75 kg)	RS Jr	Rangeview HS	Aurora, CO
G	30	Kris Martin (I) (redshirt)	6 ft 6 in (1.98 m)	180 lb (82 kg)	Jr	Kimball HS; Oral Roberts	Frisco, TX
F/C	32	Nico Carvacho	6 ft 10 in (2.08 m)	225 lb (102 kg)	RS So	Sunrise Christian Academy	Frisco, TX

Head coach

- Larry Eustachy (Long Beach State)

Assistant coach(es)

- Steve Barnes (Azusa Pacific)
- Jase Herl (Colorado Mesa)
- Willie Glover (Southern Miss)

Legend

- (C) Team captain
- (S) Suspended
- (I) Ineligible
- (W) Walk-on
- Injured
- Current redshirt

Roster

== Schedule and results ==
Date time, TV	Rank^{#}	Opponent^{#}	Result	Record	Site (attendance) city, state
Exhibition
Nov 3, 2017*; 7:00 pm		Colorado Mesa	W 86–75		Moby Arena (2,845); Fort Collins, CO
Nov 5, 2017*; 5:00 pm		Northern Colorado; Puerto Rico relief fund exhibition game	W 83–79		Moby Arena (1,079); Fort Collins, CO
Non-conference regular season
Nov 10, 2017*; 7:30 pm		Sacramento State	W 72–61	1–0	Moby Arena (3,797); Fort Collins, CO
Nov 14, 2017*; 7:00 pm		Winthrop; Jamaica Classic Montego Bay campus-site game	W 80–76	2–0	Moby Arena (2,697); Fort Collins, CO
Nov 17, 2017*; 12:00 pm, CBSSN		vs. Tulane; Jamaica Classic Montego Bay	L 53–80	2–1	Montego Bay Convention Center (235); Montego Bay, Jamaica
Nov 19, 2017*; 3:00 pm, CBSSN		vs. Florida State; Jamaica Classic Montego Bay	L 73–90	2–2	Montego Bay Convention Center (278); Montego Bay, Jamaica
Nov 22, 2017*; 7:00 pm		at New Mexico State	L 76–89	2–3	Pan American Center (3,883); Las Cruces, NM
Nov 24, 2017*; 7:00 pm		Northwestern State; Jamaica Classic Montego Bay campus-site game	W 72–60	3–3	Moby Arena (2,819); Fort Collins, CO
Nov 28, 2017*; 6:00 pm, ESPN3		at Missouri State; MW–MVC Challenge	L 67–77	3–4	JQH Arena (4,895); Springfield, MO
Dec 2, 2017*; 11:00 am, ATTSNRM		Colorado	W 72–63	4–4	Moby Arena (5,217); Fort Collins, CO
Dec 5, 2017*; 6:00 pm		at Arkansas	L 66–92	4–5	Bud Walton Arena (13,634); Fayetteville, AR
Dec 9, 2017*; 8:00 pm, P12N		at Oregon	L 65–95	4–6	Matthew Knight Arena (7,153); Eugene, OR
Dec 17, 2017*; 3:00 pm		Texas State	W 66–58	5–6	Moby Arena (2,737); Fort Collins, CO
Dec 17, 2017*; 7:00 pm		Arkansas–Fort Smith	W 87–73	6–6	Moby Arena (2,370); Fort Collins, CO
Dec 23, 2017*; 2:00 pm		Long Beach State	W 68–66	7–6	Moby Arena (2,752); Fort Collins, CO
Mountain West regular season
Dec 27, 2017; 7:30 pm, CBSSN		at Boise State	L 71–93	7–7 (0–1)	Taco Bell Arena (7,538); Boise, ID
Dec 30, 2017; 3:00 pm		at San Jose State	W 59–52	8–7 (1–1)	Event Center Arena (1,385); San Jose, CA
Jan 3, 2018; 7:00 pm, CBSSN		San Diego State	L 68–77	8–8 (1–2)	Moby Arena (3,020); Fort Collins, CO
Jan 6, 2018; 3:30 pm, CBSSN		Fresno State	L 79–82 ^{OT}	8–9 (1–3)	Moby Arena (3,541); Fort Collins, CO
Jan 10, 2018; 7:00 pm		at Utah State	W 84–75	9–9 (2–3)	Smith Spectrum (6,144); Logan, UT
Jan 13, 2018; 2:00 pm, CBSSN		at Wyoming; Border War	W 78–73	10–9 (3–3)	Arena-Auditorium (7,014); Laramie, WY
Jan 17, 2018; 7:00 pm, ATTSNRM		Air Force	L 71–76	10–10 (3–4)	Moby Arena (3,216); Fort Collins, CO
Jan 20, 2018; 3:00 pm, CBSSN		UNLV	L 74–79	10–11 (3–5)	Moby Arena (4,383); Fort Collins, CO
Jan 24, 2018; 9:00 pm, CBSSN		at San Diego State	L 78–97	10–12 (3–6)	Viejas Arena (11,144); San Diego, CA
Jan 27, 2018; 8:00 pm, ESPN3		at New Mexico	L 65–80	10–13 (3–7)	Dreamstyle Arena (12,438); Albuquerque, NM
Jan 31, 2018; 7:00 pm, ATTSNRM		Wyoming; Border War	L 86–91 ^{2OT}	10–14 (3–8)	Moby Arena (4,177); Fort Collins, CO
Feb 3, 2018; 6:00 pm, ESPNU		Nevada	L 67–76	10–15 (3–9)	Moby Arena (3,978); Fort Collins, CO
Feb 7, 2018; 8:00 pm, ATTSNRM		at Air Force	L 73–78	10–16 (3–10)	Clune Arena (2,556); Colorado Springs, CO
Feb 10, 2018; 2:00 pm		San Jose State	W 90–79	11–16 (4–10)	Moby Arena (2,984); Fort Collins, CO
Feb 17, 2018; 5:00 pm, ESPN3		at Fresno State	L 65–86	11–17 (4–11)	Save Mart Center (6,882); Fresno, CA
Feb 21, 2018; 7:00 pm, ESPN3		Boise State	L 54–87	11–18 (4–12)	Moby Arena (2,850); Fort Collins, CO
Feb 25, 2018; 2:00 pm, CBSSN		at No. 20 Nevada	L 83–92	11–19 (4–13)	Lawlor Events Center (10,273); Reno, NV
Feb 28, 2018; 7:00 pm, ATTSNRM		New Mexico	L 87–108	11–20 (4–14)	Moby Arena (2,917); Fort Collins, CO
Mountain West tournament
Mar 7, 2018; 2:30 pm, Stadium	(10)	vs. (7) Utah State; First round	L 65–76	11–21	Thomas & Mack Center (4,994); Paradise, NV
*Non-conference game. ^{#}Rankings from AP Poll. (#) Tournament seedings in parentheses. All times are in Mountain Time.
