= 2017–18 New Mexico Lobos men's basketball team =

American college basketball season

2017–18 New Mexico Lobos men's basketball
- Conference: Mountain West Conference
- Record: 19–15 (12–6 MW)
- Head coach: Paul Weir (1st season)
- Assistant coaches: Chris Harriman; Brandon Mason; Jerome Robinson
- Home arena: Dreamstyle Arena

2017–18 Mountain West Conference men's basketball standings
	Conf.				Overall
Team	W		L	PCT	W		L	PCT
No. 24 Nevada	15	–	3	.833	29	–	8	.784
Boise State	13	–	5	.722	23	–	9	.719
New Mexico	12	–	6	.667	19	–	15	.559
Fresno State	11	–	7	.611	21	–	11	.656
San Diego State †	11	–	7	.611	22	–	11	.667
Wyoming	10	–	8	.556	20	–	13	.606
UNLV	8	–	10	.444	20	–	13	.606
Utah State	8	–	10	.444	17	–	17	.500
Air Force	6	–	12	.333	12	–	19	.387
Colorado State	4	–	14	.222	11	–	21	.344
San Jose State	1	–	17	.056	4	–	26	.133
† Conference tournament winner Rankings from AP poll

The 2017–18 New Mexico Lobos men's basketball team represented the University of New Mexico during the 2017–18 NCAA Division I men's basketball season. The Lobos were led by first-year head coach Paul Weir. They played their home games at Dreamstyle Arena, more commonly known as The Pit, in Albuquerque, New Mexico as members of the Mountain West Conference. They finished the season 19–15, 12–6 in Mountain West play to finish in third place. They defeated Wyoming and Utah State to advance to the championship game of the Mountain West tournament where they lost to San Diego State.

== Previous season ==
The Lobos finished the season 17–14, 10–8 in Mountain West play to finish in fifth place. They lost in the quarterfinals of the Mountain West tournament to Fresno State. On March 31, head coach Craig Neal was fired from the program.

== Offseason ==
=== Departures ===
Name	Pos.	Height	Weight	Year	Hometown	Reason for departure
Adam Cumber	G	6'2"	185	RS So.	Albuquerque, NM	Walk-on; Left team.
Aher Uguak	G/F	6'7"	206	Fr.	Edmonton, Alberta	Transferred to Loyola–Chicago
Damien Jefferson	G/F	6'5"	190	Fr.	East Chicago, Indiana	Transferred to Creighton.
Elijah Brown	G	6'4"	200	RS Jr.	Orange County, California	Graduated; Transferred to Oregon.
Holt Shelley	F	6'9"	221	Fr.	Cliff, New Mexico	Walk-on; left team for personal reasons.
Jalen Harris	G	6'2"	156	Fr.	Wilson, North Carolina	Transferred to Arkansas.
Jordan Hunter	G	5'11"	180	So.	Beaumont, Texas	Transferred to Lamar.
Obij Aget	C	7'1"	220	Sr.	Juba, South Sudan	Graduated.
Tim Williams	F	6'8"	240	RS Sr.	Flossmoor, Illinois	Graduated.
Xavier Adams	G	6'4"	205	Jr.	Flower Mound, Texas	Transferred to Pittsburg State.

=== Incoming transfers ===
Name	Pos.	Height	Weight	Year	Hometown	Notes
Antino Jackson	G	6'0"	170	Sr.	Houston, TX	Graduate transfer from Akron. Will be eligible to play immediately.
Chris McNeal	G	6'1"	185	Jr.	Jackson, TN	Junior college transfer from Indian Hills Community College. McNeal is eligible to play immediately.
Jachai Simmons	F	6'8"	190	Jr.	Plainfield, NJ	Junior college transfer from Midland College. Simmons is eligible to play immediately.
JaQuan Lyle	G	6'5"	210	Jr.	Evansville, IN	Transfer from Ohio State. Will have to redshirt for the 2017–18 season due to NCAA transfer rules, with 2 years of remaining eligibility.
Troy Simons	G	6'3"	195	Jr.	Pittsburgh, PA	Junior college transfer from Polk State College. Simons is eligible to play immediately.
Vance Jackson	F	6'9"	235	So.	Los Angeles, CA	Transfer from Connecticut. Will have to redshirt for the 2017–18 season due to NCAA transfer rules, with 3 years of remaining eligibility.

=== 2017 recruiting class ===
College recruiting information
Name	Hometown	School	Height	Weight	Commit date
Makuach Maluach; F	Sydney, Australia	Newington College	6 ft 5 in (1.96 m)	190 lb (86 kg)	Jul 20, 2017
Makuach Maluach; F	Recruit ratings: Scout: Rivals: 247Sports: ESPN: (N/A)				
Vladimir Pinchuk; F	Hagen, Germany	Phoenix Hagen	6 ft 9 in (2.06 m)	210 lb (95 kg)	Aug 11, 2017
Vladimir Pinchuk; F	Recruit ratings: Scout: Rivals: 247Sports: ESPN: (N/A)				
Overall recruit ranking:
Note: In many cases, Scout, Rivals, 247Sports, On3, and ESPN may conflict in their listings of height and weight.; In these cases, the average was taken. ESPN grades are on a 100-point scale.; Sources: "2017 New Mexico Basketball Commits". ESPN.

=== 2018 Recruiting class ===
College recruiting information
Name	Hometown	School	Height	Weight	Commit date
Drue Drinnon; PG	Mableton, GA	University School	6 ft 0 in (1.83 m)	165 lb (75 kg)	Oct 29, 2017
Drue Drinnon; PG	Recruit ratings: Scout: Rivals: 247Sports: ESPN: (82)				
Overall recruit ranking:
Note: In many cases, Scout, Rivals, 247Sports, On3, and ESPN may conflict in their listings of height and weight.; In these cases, the average was taken. ESPN grades are on a 100-point scale.; Sources:

== Preseason ==
In a vote by conference media at the Mountain West media day, the Lobos were picked to finish in ninth place in the Mountain West.

== Roster ==
2017–18 New Mexico Lobos men's basketball team
Players
Coaches

Pos.	#	Name	Height	Weight	Year	Previous school	Hometown
G	0	Matt Vail (W)	6 ft 0 in (1.83 m)	145 lb (66 kg)	Fr	Grants HS	Grants, New Mexico
G	1	Chris McNeal	6 ft 1 in (1.85 m)	185 lb (84 kg)	Jr	Indian Hills C.C.	Jackson, Tennessee
G/F	2	Sam Logwood	6 ft 7 in (2.01 m)	215 lb (98 kg)	Sr	La Lumiere School	Indianapolis, Indiana
G	3	Antino Jackson	5 ft 11 in (1.8 m)	170 lb (77 kg)	Sr	Akron	Houston, Texas
F	5	Joe Furstinger	6 ft 9 in (2.06 m)	230 lb (104 kg)	Sr	Santa Margarita Catholic HS	Rancho Santa Margarita, California
G/F	10	Makuach Maluach	6 ft 5 in (1.96 m)	190 lb (86 kg)	Fr	Newington College	Sydney, Australia
G/F	11	Jachai Simmons	6 ft 7 in (2.01 m)	180 lb (82 kg)	Jr	Midland	Plainfield, New Jersey
G	13	JaQuan Lyle (redshirt)	6 ft 5 in (1.96 m)	210 lb (95 kg)	Jr	Ohio State	Evansville, Indiana
G/F	14	Dane Kuiper	6 ft 7 in (2.01 m)	200 lb (91 kg)	Jr	Corona del Sol HS	Wasilla, Alaska
F/C	15	Vladimir Pinchuk	6 ft 10 in (2.08 m)	230 lb (104 kg)	Fr	Phoenix Hagen	Hagen, Germany
F	22	Vance Jackson (redshirt)	6 ft 8 in (2.03 m)	235 lb (107 kg)	So	Connecticut	Los Angeles, California
G	31	Troy Simons	6 ft 2 in (1.88 m)	195 lb (88 kg)	Jr	Polk State	Pittsburgh, Pennsylvania
G	32	Anthony Mathis	6 ft 3 in (1.91 m)	175 lb (79 kg)	Jr	West Linn High HS	West Linn, Oregon
F	55	Connor MacDougall	6 ft 9 in (2.06 m)	230 lb (104 kg)	RS Jr	South Mountain C.C.	Tempe, Arizona

Head coach

- Paul Weir (York)

Assistant coach(es)

- Chris Harriman (Augusta State)
- Brandon Mason (New Mexico State)
- Jerome Robinson (Bradley)

Legend

- (C) Team captain
- (S) Suspended
- (I) Ineligible
- (W) Walk-on
- Injured
- Current redshirt

Roster

== Schedule and results ==
Date time, TV	Rank^{#}	Opponent^{#}	Result	Record	Site (attendance) city, state
Exhibition
Oct 27, 2017*; 7:00 pm		BYU; Charity Exhibition for Hurricane Victims	L 73–79		Dreamstyle Arena (4,902); Albuquerque, NM
Non-conference regular season
Nov 11, 2017*; 7:00 pm		Northern New Mexico	W 147–76	1–0	Dreamstyle Arena (10,695); Albuquerque, NM
Nov 14, 2017*; 7:00 pm		Omaha; Emerald Coast Classic campus-site game	W 103–71	2–0	Dreamstyle Arena (9,601); Albuquerque, NM
Nov 17, 2017*; 7:00 pm		at New Mexico State; Rio Grande Rivalry	L 56–75	2–1	Pan American Center (6,839); Las Cruces, NM
Nov 21, 2017*; 7:00 pm		Tennessee Tech; Emerald Coast Classic campus-site game	L 96-104	2–2	Dreamstyle Arena (9,703); Albuquerque, NM
Nov 24, 2017*; 5:00 pm, CBSSN		vs. TCU; Emerald Coast Classic semifinals	L 67–69	2–3	The Arena at NWFSC (1,000); Niceville, FL
Nov 25, 2017*; 2:00 pm		vs. Maryland; Emerald Coast Classic 3rd place game	L 65–80	2–4	The Arena at NWFSC (1,250); Niceville, FL
Nov 29, 2017*; 7:00 pm, ATTSNRM		Evansville; MW–MVC Challenge	W 78–59	3–4	Dreamstyle Arena (8,943); Albuquerque, NM
Dec 2, 2017*; 7:00 pm		at UTEP	L 76–88	3–5	Don Haskins Center (6,394); El Paso, TX
Dec 6, 2017*; 7:00 pm, P12N		at Colorado	L 57–75	3–6	Coors Events Center (6,610); Boulder, CO
Dec 9, 2017*; 7:00 pm, ESPN3		New Mexico State; Rio Grande Rivalry	L 62–65	3–7	Dreamstyle Arena (12,768); Albuquerque, NM
Dec 16, 2017*; 6:00 pm, CBSSN		No. 23 Arizona	L 73–89	3–8	Dreamstyle Arena (13,207); Albuquerque, NM
Dec 19, 2017*; 7:30 pm, ATTSNRM		Rice	W 78–69	4–8	Dreamstyle Arena (9,415); Albuquerque, NM
Dec 22, 2017*; 7:00 pm, ATTSNRM		Prairie View A&M	W 87–78	5–8	Dreamstyle Arena (9,423); Albuquerque, NM
Mountain West regular season
Dec 27, 2017; 7:00 pm, ATTSNRM		Air Force	W 87–58	6–8 (1–0)	Dreamstyle Arena (10,514); Albuquerque, NM
Dec 30, 2017; 3:00 pm, ATTSNRM		at Nevada	L 74–77	6–9 (1–1)	Lawlor Events Center (9,530); Reno, NV
Jan 3, 2018; 7:00 pm, ESPN3		at Boise State	L 62–90	6–10 (1–2)	Taco Bell Arena (7,557); Boise, ID
Jan 6, 2018; 7:00 pm		San Jose State	W 80–47	7–10 (2–2)	Dreamstyle Arena (10,799); Albuquerque, NM
Jan 10, 2018; 7:00 pm, Stadium		Wyoming	W 75–66	8–10 (3–2)	Dreamstyle Arena (9,846); Albuquerque, NM
Jan 13, 2018; 5:00 pm, ESPN3		at Fresno State	L 80–89	8–11 (3–3)	Save Mart Center (6,244); Fresno, CA
Jan 17, 2018; 8:00 pm, ESPN3		at UNLV	W 85–81	9–11 (4–3)	Thomas & Mack Center (10,546); Paradise, NV
Jan 20, 2018; 5:00 pm, CBSSN		San Diego State	W 79–75	10–11 (5–3)	Dreamstyle Arena (11,418); Albuquerque, NM
Jan 27, 2018; 7:00 pm, ESPN3		Colorado State	W 80–65	11–11 (6–3)	Dreamstyle Arena (12,438); Albuquerque, NM
Jan 31, 2018; 7:00 pm		at Utah State	L 80–89	11–12 (6–4)	Smith Spectrum (6,345); Logan, UT
Feb 3, 2018; 4:00 pm, ATTSNRM		at San Jose State	W 71–68	12–12 (7–4)	Event Center Arena (2,151); San Jose, CA
Feb 6, 2018; 8:00 pm, ESPNU		Boise State	L 71–73	12–13 (7–5)	Dreamstyle Arena (11,357); Albuquerque, NM
Feb 10, 2018; 2:00 pm, ESPN3		at Air Force	L 92–100	12–14 (7–6)	Clune Arena (2,851); Colorado Springs, CO
Feb 14, 2018; 7:00 pm		Utah State	W 78–63	13–14 (8–6)	Dreamstyle Arena (9,737); Albuquerque, NM
Feb 21, 2018; 7:00 pm, ATTSNRM		at Wyoming	W 119–114	14–14 (9–6)	Arena-Auditorium (4,321); Laramie, WY
Feb 24, 2018; 12:00 pm, CBSSN		UNLV	W 91–90	15–14 (10–6)	Dreamstyle Arena (12,080); Albuquerque, NM
Feb 28, 2018; 7:00 pm, ATTSNRM		at Colorado State	W 108–87	16–14 (11–6)	Moby Arena (2,917); Fort Collins, CO
Mar 3, 2018; 7:00 pm, ESPN3		Fresno State	W 95–86	17–14 (12–6)	Dreamstyle Arena (13,069); Albuquerque, NM
Mountain West tournament
Mar 8, 2018; 8:30 pm, CBSSN	(3)	vs. (6) Wyoming; Quarterfinals	W 85–75	18–14	Thomas & Mack Center (6,753); Paradise, NV
Mar 9, 2018; 8:30 pm, CBSSN	(3)	vs. (7) Utah State; Semifinals	W 83–68	19–14	Thomas & Mack Center (8,224); Paradise, NV
Mar 10, 2018; 4:00 pm, CBS	(3)	vs. (5) San Diego State; Championship Game	L 75–82	19–15	Thomas & Mack Center (8,456); Paradise, NV
*Non-conference game. ^{#}Rankings from AP Poll. (#) Tournament seedings in parentheses. All times are in Mountain Time.
