= 2017–18 Utah State Aggies men's basketball team =

American college basketball season

2017–18 Utah State Aggies men's basketball
- Conference: Mountain West Conference
- Record: 17–17 (8–10 MW)
- Head coach: Tim Duryea (3rd season)
- Assistant coaches: Tarvish Felton; Louis Wilson; Spencer Nelson
- Home arena: Smith Spectrum

2017–18 Mountain West Conference men's basketball standings
	Conf.				Overall
Team	W		L	PCT	W		L	PCT
No. 24 Nevada	15	–	3	.833	29	–	8	.784
Boise State	13	–	5	.722	23	–	9	.719
New Mexico	12	–	6	.667	19	–	15	.559
Fresno State	11	–	7	.611	21	–	11	.656
San Diego State †	11	–	7	.611	22	–	11	.667
Wyoming	10	–	8	.556	20	–	13	.606
UNLV	8	–	10	.444	20	–	13	.606
Utah State	8	–	10	.444	17	–	17	.500
Air Force	6	–	12	.333	12	–	19	.387
Colorado State	4	–	14	.222	11	–	21	.344
San Jose State	1	–	17	.056	4	–	26	.133
† Conference tournament winner Rankings from AP poll

The 2017–18 Utah State Aggies men's basketball team represented Utah State University in the 2017–18 NCAA Division I men's basketball season. The Aggies, led by third-year head coach Tim Duryea, played their home games at the Smith Spectrum in Logan, Utah as members of the Mountain West Conference. They finished the season 17–17 overall and 8–10 in conference play, finishing tied for 7th. In the Mountain West Conference tournament, they defeated Colorado State in the first round and Boise State in the quarterfinals before losing to New Mexico in the semi-finals.

On March 11, 2018, head coach Tim Duryea was fired after three seasons. He finished at Utah State with a three-year record of 47–49. On March 25, reports indicated that the school had hired South Dakota head coach Craig Smith as head coach, which was confirmed the next day.

== Previous season ==
The Aggies finished the 2016–17 season 14–17, 7–11 in Mountain West play to finish in tie for eighth place. They defeated San Jose State in the first round of the Mountain West tournament to advance to the quarterfinals where they lost to Nevada.

== Offseason ==
=== Departures ===
Name	Number	Pos.	Height	Weight	Year	Hometown	Reason for departure
Shane Rector	0	G	6'2"	180	Senior	Bronx, NY	Graduated
Ngor Barnaba	13	F	6'8"	235	Junior	Rochester, MN	Graduate transferred to Northwest Nazarene
Jalen Moore	14	G/F	6'9"	220	Senior	Smithfield, UT	Graduated
Connor Garner	25	G	6'3"	200	Senior	Raft River, ID	Graduated
Trevin Dorius	32	F	6'10"	215	Freshman	Heber City, UT	Walk-on; didn't return

=== Incoming transfers ===
Name	Number	Pos.	Height	Weight	Year	Hometown	Notes
Deangelo Isby	0	F	6'5"	195	Junior	Chicago, IL	Junior college transferred from Wabash Valley College
Dwayne Brown Jr.	25	F	6'7"	220	Junior	Conyers, GA	Junior college transferred from Northern Oklahoma College

=== Recruiting ===
Utah State did not have any incoming players in the 2017 recruiting class.

== Preseason ==
In a vote by conference media at the Mountain West media day, the Aggies were picked to finish in eighth place in the Mountain West. Sophomore guard Koby McEwen was named to the preseason All-Mountain West team.

== Roster ==
2017–18 Utah State Aggies men's basketball team
Players
Coaches

Pos.	#	Name	Height	Weight	Year	Previous school	Hometown
G	0	DeAngelo Isby	6 ft 5 in (1.96 m)	200 lb (91 kg)	Jr	Hillcrest HS; Wabash Valley JC	Chicago, IL
G	1	Koby McEwen	6 ft 4 in (1.93 m)	200 lb (91 kg)	So	Wasatch Academy	Toronto, ON
F	2	Klay Stall	6 ft 10 in (2.08 m)	240 lb (109 kg)	RS Fr	Basha HS	Chandler, AZ
G	3	Sam Merrill	6 ft 5 in (1.96 m)	210 lb (95 kg)	So	Bountiful HS	Bountiful, UT
G	4	Crew Ainge (W)	5 ft 11 in (1.8 m)	180 lb (82 kg)	RS Fr	Kimball Union Academy	Wellesley, MA
G	5	Julion Pearre	6 ft 3 in (1.91 m)	205 lb (93 kg)	Sr	McKinney North HS	McKinney, TX
F	10	Quinn Taylor	6 ft 8 in (2.03 m)	240 lb (109 kg)	RS Jr	Langham Creek	Houston, TX
F	11	Alex Dargenton	6 ft 8 in (2.03 m)	205 lb (93 kg)	RS Sr	Laramie County CC	Fort-de-France, Martinique
F	12	Justin Bean (W) (redshirt)	6 ft 7 in (2.01 m)	205 lb (93 kg)	Fr	Southmoore HS	Moore, OK
G	13	Taylor Larson	6 ft 4 in (1.93 m)	210 lb (95 kg)	So	American Fork HS	Highland, UT
F	15	Norbert Janicek	6 ft 11 in (2.11 m)	250 lb (113 kg)	Jr	Canarias Basketball Academy; Snow College	Dražkovce, Slovakia
G	22	Brock Miller	6 ft 6 in (1.98 m)	200 lb (91 kg)	Fr	Brighton HS	Sandy, UT
F	23	Daron Henson	6 ft 7 in (2.01 m)	205 lb (93 kg)	RS Fr	Cathedral HS	Pasadena, CA
G	24	Diogo Brito	6 ft 5 in (1.96 m)	205 lb (93 kg)	RS So	Mountain Mission School	Póvoa de Varzim, Portugal
F	25	Dwayne Brown Jr.	6 ft 6 in (1.98 m)	220 lb (100 kg)	Jr	Rockdale County HS; Northern Oklahoma CC	Conyers, GA
G	30	Abel Porter	6 ft 3 in (1.91 m)	195 lb (88 kg)	RS Fr	Davis HS	Farmington, UT

Head coach

- Tim Duryea (North Texas)

Assistant coach(es)

- Tarvish Felton (Southern Utah University)
- Louis Wilson (William Jewell College)
- Spencer Nelson (Utah State)

Legend

- (C) Team captain
- (S) Suspended
- (I) Ineligible
- (W) Walk-on
- Injured
- Current redshirt

== Schedule and results ==
Date time, TV	Rank^{#}	Opponent^{#}	Result	Record	Site (attendance) city, state
Exhibition
11/03/2017*; 7:00 pm		Providence (MT)	W 98–54		Smith Spectrum (6,201); Logan, UT
Non-conference regular season
11/10/2017*; 7:00 pm		at Weber State; Old Oquirrh Bucket	L 59–65	0–1	Dee Events Center (8,592); Ogden, UT
11/13/2017*; 7:00 pm		Montana State	W 81–73	1–1	Smith Spectrum (7,154); Logan, UT
11/15/2017*; 7:00 pm		Mississippi Valley State	W 83–47	2–1	Smith Spectrum (7,244); Logan, UT
11/18/2017*; 8:00 pm, ATTSNRM		at No. 17 Gonzaga; Phil Knight Invitational	L 66–79	2–2	McCarthey Athletic Center (6,000); Spokane, WA
11/20/2017*; 8:00 pm		at Portland State; Phil Knight Invitational	L 79–83	2–3	Veterans Memorial Coliseum (804); Portland, OR
11/24/2017*; 1:00 pm		vs. Northeastern; Phil Knight Invitational sub-regional	W 71–67	3–3	Nashville Municipal Auditorium (400); Nashville, TN
11/26/2017*; 11:00 am		vs. New Hampshire; Phil Knight Invitational sub-regional	W 77–63	4–3	Nashville Municipal Auditorium (400); Nashville, TN
11/28/2017*; 6:00 pm		at Valparaiso; MW–MVC Challenge	L 65–72	4–4	Athletics–Recreation Center (2,949); Valparaiso, IN
12/02/2017*; 7:00 pm, ATTSNRM		BYU; Old Oquirrh Bucket	L 66–75	4–5	Smith Spectrum (10,206); Logan, UT
12/06/2017*; 7:00 pm		UC Irvine	L 66–75	5–5	Smith Spectrum (5,443); Logan, UT
12/09/2017*; 5:30 pm, P12N		vs. Utah; Old Oquirrh Bucket/Beehive Classic	L 67–77	5–6	Vivint Smart Home Arena (7,729); Salt Lack City, UT
12/16/2017*; 7:00 pm		Life Pacific	W 96–62	6–6	Smith Spectrum (6,342); Logan, UT
12/20/2017*; 7:00 pm		Youngstown State	W 91–74	7–6	Smith Spectrum (6,054); Logan, UT
Mountain West regular season
12/27/2017; 7:00 pm		San Jose State	W 86–72	8–6 (1–0)	Smith Spectrum (6,759); Logan, UT
12/30/2017; 8:00 pm, ESPN3		at San Diego State	L 59–79	8–7 (1–1)	Viejas Arena (12,414); San Diego, CA
01/03/2018; 7:00 pm		Fresno State	W 81–79 ^{OT}	9–7 (2–1)	Smith Spectrum (8,276); Logan, UT
01/06/2018; 8:00 pm, ATTSNRM		at UNLV	W 85–78	10–7 (3–1)	Thomas & Mack Center (12,386); Paradise, NV
01/10/2018; 7:00 pm		Colorado State	L 75–84	10–8 (3–2)	Smith Spectrum (6,144); Logan, UT
01/13/2018; 6:00 pm, ESPN3		at Nevada	L 57–83	10–9 (3–3)	Lawlor Events Center (9,976); Reno, NV
01/17/2018; 7:00 pm, Stadium		at Boise State	L 67–71	10–10 (3–4)	Taco Bell Arena (7,002); Boise, ID
01/20/2018; 7:00 pm		Wyoming	L 77–85	10–11 (3–5)	Smith Spectrum (7,148); Logan, UT
01/24/2018; 7:00 pm		Air Force	W 71–49	11–11 (4–5)	Smith Spectrum (6,974); Logan, UT
01/27/2018; 5:00 pm		at Fresno State	W 65–62	12–11 (5–5)	Save Mart Center (7,317); Fresno, CA
01/31/2018; 7:00 pm		New Mexico	W 89–80	13–11 (6–5)	Smith Spectrum (6,345); Logan, UT
02/07/2018; 7:00 pm		at Wyoming	L 65–83	13–12 (6–6)	Arena-Auditorium (4,672); Laramie, WY
02/10/2018; 7:00 pm, ATTSNRM		Boise State	W 71–65	14–12 (7–6)	Smith Spectrum (8,421); Logan, UT
02/14/2018; 7:00 pm		at New Mexico	L 63–78	14–13 (7–7)	The Pit (9,737); Albuquerque, NM
02/17/2018; 4:00 pm, CBSSN		No. 24 Nevada	L 87–93	14–14 (7–8)	Smith Spectrum (5,796); Logan, UT
02/24/2018; 2:00 pm		at Air Force	L 65–75	14–15 (7–9)	Clune Arena (3,267); Colorado Springs, CO
02/28/2018; 8:00 pm		at San Jose State	L 62–64	14–16 (7–10)	Event Center Arena (1,761); San Jose, CA
03/03/2018; 7:00 pm, ESPN3		UNLV	W 79–67	15–16 (8–10)	Smith Spectrum (5,853); Logan, UT
Mountain West tournament
03/07/2018; 2:30 pm, Stadium	(7)	vs. (10) Colorado State; First round	W 76–65	16–16	Thomas & Mack Center (4,994); Paradise, NV
03/08/2018; 7:00 pm, CBSSN	(7)	vs. (2) Boise State; Quarterfinals	W 78–75	17–16	Thomas & Mack Center (7,138); Paradise, NV
03/09/2018; 8:30 pm, CBSSN	(7)	vs. (3) New Mexico; Semifinals	L 68–83	17–17	Thomas & Mack Center (8,224); Paradise, NV
*Non-conference game. ^{#}Rankings from AP Poll. (#) Tournament seedings in parentheses. All times are in Mountain Source.
