= 2017–18 Fresno State Bulldogs men's basketball team =

American college basketball season

2017–18 Fresno State Bulldogs men's basketball
- Conference: Mountain West Conference
- Record: 21–11 (11–7 MW)
- Head coach: Rodney Terry (7th season)
- Assistant coaches: Jerry Wainwright; Byron Jones; Nick Matson
- Home arena: Save Mart Center (Capacity: 15,596)

2017–18 Mountain West Conference men's basketball standings
	Conf.				Overall
Team	W		L	PCT	W		L	PCT
No. 24 Nevada	15	–	3	.833	29	–	8	.784
Boise State	13	–	5	.722	23	–	9	.719
New Mexico	12	–	6	.667	19	–	15	.559
Fresno State	11	–	7	.611	21	–	11	.656
San Diego State †	11	–	7	.611	22	–	11	.667
Wyoming	10	–	8	.556	20	–	13	.606
UNLV	8	–	10	.444	20	–	13	.606
Utah State	8	–	10	.444	17	–	17	.500
Air Force	6	–	12	.333	12	–	19	.387
Colorado State	4	–	14	.222	11	–	21	.344
San Jose State	1	–	17	.056	4	–	26	.133
† Conference tournament winner Rankings from AP poll

The 2017–18 Fresno State Bulldogs men's basketball team represented California State University, Fresno in the 2017–18 NCAA Division I men's basketball season. The Bulldogs were led by seventh-year head coach Rodney Terry and played their home games at the Save Mart Center as members of the Mountain West Conference. They finished the season 21–11, 11–7 in Mountain West play to finish in a tie for fourth place. They lost in the quarterfinals of the Mountain West Conference tournament to San Diego State. Despite having 21 wins, they did not participate in a postseason tournament.

On March 12, 2018, head coach Rodney Terry left Fresno State to become head coach at UTEP. He finished at Fresno State with a seven-year record of 126–108. On April 5, it was announced that the school had hired San Diego State assistant coach Justin Hutson as head coach.

== Previous season ==
The Bulldogs finished the season 20–13 overall; and 11–7 in the conference. During the season, Fresno State was invited and participated in the Mountain West–Missouri Valley Challenge, where they defeated Drake in Des Moines, Iowa. In the postseason, Fresno State won against New Mexico but lost to Nevada in the semifinals of the 2017 Mountain West Conference men's basketball tournament in Paradise, Nevada. The Bulldogs were invited and participated in the 2017 National Invitation Tournament, where they lost to TCU in the first round in Fort Worth, Texas.

== Offseason ==
=== Departures ===
Name	Number	Pos.	Height	Weight	Year	Hometown	Notes
Darryl McDowell-White	0	G	6'1"	175	Freshman	Brisbane, Australia	Dismissed due to academic probation
William McDowell-White	2	G	6'5"	185	Freshman	Brisbane, Australia	Dismissed due to academic probation
Paul Watson	3	G/F	6'7"	210	Senior	Phoenix, AZ	Graduated
Karachi Edo	4	F	6'6"	230	Senior	Richardson, TX	Dismissed due to domestic violence
Cullen Russo	13	F	6'9"	225	Senior	Bloomington, Minnesota	Graduated|
Ryan Beddeo	14	G	6'2"	185	Freshman	Valencia, CA	Transferred Canyons CC
Grant Shell	15	G	6'3"	175	Sophomore	Burlington, KS	Transferred to Emporia State
Ountae Campbell	22	G	6'4"	195	Sophomore	Los Angeles, CA	Transferred to Casper CC
Jacob Holland	24	G	6'4"	195	Junior	Los Lunas, NM	Transferred to New Mexico Highlands

=== Incoming transfers ===
Name	Number	Pos.	Height	Weight	Year	Hometown	Notes
New Williams	0	G	6'2"	170	Sophomore	Inglewood, CA	Transferred from Auburn. Under NCAA transfer rules, Williams will have to sit out for the 2017–18 season. Will have three years of remaining eligibility.
Braxton Huggins	4	G	6'3"	184	Senior	Bakersfield, CA	Transferred from New Mexico State. Under NCAA transfer rules, Williams will have to sit out for the 2017–18 season. Will have one year of remaining eligibility.
Eric Vila	10	F	6'11"	206	Sophomore	Girona, Spain	Transferred from Texas A&M. Under NCAA transfer rules, Vila will have to sit out for the 2017–18 season. Will have three years of remaining eligibility.
Ray Bowles Jr.	22	G/F	6'5"	215	RS Senior	Modesto, CA	Transferred from Pacific. Will be eligible to play immediately since Bowles Jr. graduated from Pacific.
Noah Blackwell	55	G	6'2"	190	Junior	Roseville, CA	Transferred from Long Beach State. Under NCAA transfer rules, Blackwell will have to sit out for the 2017–18 season. Will have two years of remaining eligibility.

=== 2017 recruiting class ===
College recruiting information
Name	Hometown	School	Height	Weight	Commit date
Myles Fitzgerald-Warren; PG	Portland, OR	Madison High School	6 ft 3 in (1.91 m)	176 lb (80 kg)	Mar 20, 2017
Myles Fitzgerald-Warren; PG	Recruit ratings: Scout: Rivals: (NR)				
Overall recruit ranking: Scout: – Rivals: –
Note: In many cases, Scout, Rivals, 247Sports, On3, and ESPN may conflict in their listings of height and weight.; In these cases, the average was taken. ESPN grades are on a 100-point scale.; Sources: "Fresno State Commit List for 2017". Rivals.; "Men's Basketball Recruiting". Scout.; "ESPN – Fresno State Bulldogs Basketball Recruiting 2017". ESPN.; "Scout.com Team Recruiting Rankings". Scout.; "2017 Team Ranking". Rivals.

=== 2018 recruiting class ===
College recruiting information (2018)
Name	Hometown	School	Height	Weight	Commit date
Isaac Likekele; PG	Arlington, TX	Timberview High School	6 ft 4 in (1.93 m)	205 lb (93 kg)	Sep 10, 2017
Isaac Likekele; PG	Recruit ratings: Scout: Rivals: (NR)				
Efe Odigie; PF	Houston, TX	Pro-Vision Academy	6 ft 7 in (2.01 m)	220 lb (100 kg)	Sep 25, 2017
Efe Odigie; PF	Recruit ratings: Scout: Rivals: (NR)				
Overall recruit ranking: Scout: – Rivals: –
Note: In many cases, Scout, Rivals, 247Sports, On3, and ESPN may conflict in their listings of height and weight.; In these cases, the average was taken. ESPN grades are on a 100-point scale.; Sources: "Fresno State Commit List for 2018". Rivals.; "Men's Basketball Recruiting". Scout.; "ESPN – Fresno State Bulldogs Basketball Recruiting 2018". ESPN.; "Scout.com Team Recruiting Rankings". Scout.; "2018 Team Ranking". Rivals.

== Preseason ==
In a vote by conference media at the Mountain West media day, the Brulldogs were picked to finish in fourth place in the Mountain West.

== Roster ==
2017–18 Fresno State Bulldogs men's basketball team
Players
Coaches

Pos.	#	Name	Height	Weight	Year	Previous school	Hometown
G	0	New Williams (redshirt)	6 ft 2 in (1.88 m)	175 lb (79 kg)	So	Auburn	Inglewood, California
G	1	Jaron Hopkins	6 ft 6 in (1.98 m)	210 lb (95 kg)	RS Sr	Colorado	Mesa, Arizona
G	3	Johnny McWilliams	6 ft 6 in (1.98 m)	210 lb (95 kg)	So	San Marcos HS	San Marcos, California
G	4	Braxton Huggins (redshirt)	6 ft 3 in (1.91 m)	184 lb (83 kg)	Sr	New Mexico State	Bakersfield, California
G	5	Jahmel Taylor	6 ft 0 in (1.83 m)	175 lb (79 kg)	RS Sr	Washington	Los Angeles, California
F	10	Eric Vila (redshirt)	6 ft 11 in (2.11 m)	210 lb (95 kg)	So	Texas A&M	Girona, Spain
F	11	Bryson Williams	6 ft 8 in (2.03 m)	230 lb (104 kg)	So	Roosevelt HS	Fresno, California
F	12	Myles Fitzgerald-Warren	6 ft 3 in (1.91 m)	180 lb (82 kg)	Fr	Madison HS	Portland, Oregon
F	15	Gilles Dekoninck	6 ft 6 in (1.98 m)	210 lb (95 kg)	Fr	Huntington Prep	Diest, Belgium
G	20	Sam Bittner (W)	6 ft 6 in (1.98 m)	210 lb (95 kg)	Jr	Trinity International HS	Las Vegas, Nevada
G	21	Deshon Taylor	6 ft 2 in (1.88 m)	185 lb (84 kg)	RS Jr	UMKC	Riverside, California
G	22	Ray Bowles Jr.	6 ft 5 in (1.96 m)	205 lb (93 kg)	RS Sr	Pacific	Modesto, California
F	32	Nate Grimes	6 ft 8 in (2.03 m)	225 lb (102 kg)	RS So	Quality Education HS	Las Vegas, Nevada
C	34	Terrell Carter II	6 ft 10 in (2.08 m)	290 lb (132 kg)	Sr	Redondo Union HS	Los Angeles, California
F/C	35	Lázaro Rojas	6 ft 11 in (2.11 m)	235 lb (107 kg)	RS Fr	Score Academy HS	São José dos Campos, Brazil
G	55	Noah Blackwell (redshirt)	6 ft 3 in (1.91 m)	190 lb (86 kg)	Jr	Long Beach State	Roseville, California

Head coach

- Rodney Terry (St. Edward's)

Assistant coach(es)

- Jerry Wainwright (Colorado College)
- Byron Jones (Central Oklahoma)
- Nick Matson (VMI)

Legend

- (C) Team captain
- (S) Suspended
- (I) Ineligible
- (W) Walk-on
- Injured
- Current redshirt

Roster

== Schedule and results ==
Date time, TV	Rank^{#}	Opponent^{#}	Result	Record	High points	High rebounds	High assists	Site (attendance) city, state
Exhibition
October 25, 2017*; 8:00 pm		at Saint Mary's; Charity Exhibition benefiting North Bay Fire relief	L 76–85		22 – D. Taylor	7 – Hopkins	3 – Tied	McKeon Pavilion; Moraga, CA
October 30, 2017*; 7:00 pm		Pacific Union	W 99–56		19 – Williams	11 – Williams	6 – J. Taylor	Save Mart Center (4,523); Fresno, CA
November 3, 2017*; 7:00 pm		UC Merced	W 79–39		20 – J. Taylor	7 – Willams	5 – Bowles	Save Mart Center (4,645); Fresno, CA
Non-conference regular season
November 10, 2017*; 5:00 pm		UC Santa Cruz	W 86–65	1–0	16 – D. Taylor	8 – Grimes	6 – Tied	Save Mart Center (5,169); Fresno, CA
November 13, 2017*; 7:00 pm		Cal State Northridge; Cancún Challenge	W 89–73	2–0	18 – Tied	10 – Hopkins	5 – Bowles Jr.	Save Mart Center (4,864); Fresno, CA
November 17, 2017*; 5:00 pm		at Arkansas	L 75–83	2–1	22 – Williams	10 – Hopkins	10 – Hopkins	Bud Walton Arena (15,051); Fayetteville, AR
November 21, 2017*; 5:30 pm, CBSSN		vs. Evansville; Cancún Challenge Riviera Division semifinals	L 57–59	2–2	12 – D. Taylor	11 – Williams	5 – D. Taylor	Hard Rock Hotel Riviera Maya (982); Cancún, Mexico
November 22, 2017*; 3:00 pm, CBSSN		vs. George Mason; Cancún Challenge Riviera Division third place game	W 79–73	3–2	23 – D. Taylor	10 – Williams	3 – Tied	Hard Rock Hotel Riviera Maya (982); Cancún, Mexico
November 26, 2017*; 12:00 pm		Montana State; Cancún Challenge	W 80–67	4–2	31 – D. Taylor	7 – Tied	3 – Bowles	Save Mart Center (5,097); Fresno, CA
November 30, 2017*; 7:00 pm		Weber State	W 83–71	5–2	29 – Hopkins	8 – Williams	4 – Tied	Save Mart Center (5,105); Fresno, CA
December 2, 2017*; 4:00 pm		at Long Beach State	W 106–70	6–2	26 – Hopkins	7 – Bowles	6 – J. Taylor	Walter Pyramid (3,706); Long Beach, CA
December 5, 2017*; 7:00 pm		Cal State Bakersfield	W 70–55	7–2	19 – D. Taylor	13 – Williams	5 – J. Taylor	Save Mart Center (5,040); Fresno, CA
December 9, 2017*; 7:00 pm		at Cal Poly	W 83–63	8–2	21 – D. Taylor	7 – Tied	3 – 3 tied	Mott Athletic Center (1,994); San Luis Obispo, CA
December 13, 2017*; 7:00 pm		Arkansas–Pine Bluff	W 78–52	9–2	19 – Carter II	6 – Tied	7 – J. Taylor	Save Mart Center (4,530); Fresno, CA
December 16, 2017*; 3:00 pm, CBSSN		Oregon	L 61–68	9–3	19 – Tied	8 – Williams	3 – J. Taylor	Save Mart Center (9,225); Fresno, CA
December 18, 2017*; 7:00 pm		Cal State Monterey Bay	W 93–56	10–3	30 – Williams	17 – Grimes	9 – D. Taylor	Save Mart Center (4,747); Fresno, CA
Mountain West regular season
December 27, 2017; 7:00 pm, ESPN3		Nevada	L 65–80	10–4 (0–1)	16 – D. Taylor	8 – Hopkins	4 – J. Taylor	Save Mart Center (6,008); Fresno, CA
December 30, 2017; 4:00 pm		Air Force	W 71–59	11–4 (1–1)	18 – D. Taylor	6 – Tied	4 – Tied	Save Mart Center (6,188); Fresno, CA
January 3, 2018; 6:00 pm		at Utah State	L 79–81 ^{OT}	11–5 (1–2)	24 – D. Taylor	10 – Grimes	3 – Tied	Smith Spectrum (8,276); Logan, UT
January 6, 2018; 2:30 pm, CBSSN		at Colorado State	W 82–79 ^{OT}	12–5 (2–2)	22 – D. Taylor	7 – Williams	3 – 3 tied	Moby Arena (3,541); Fort Collins, CO
January 9, 2018; 8:00 pm, ESPNU		Boise State	L 64–70	12–6 (2–3)	15 – D. Taylor	6 – Tied	5 – Hopkins	Save Mart Center (4,980); Fresno, CA
January 13, 2018; 4:00 pm, ESPN3		New Mexico	W 89–80	13–6 (3–3)	22 – D. Taylor	9 – Hopkins	4 – Tied	Save Mart Center (6,244); Fresno, CA
January 17, 2018; 8:00 pm, ESPNU		at San Diego State	W 77–73	14–6 (4–3)	22 – D. Taylor	10 – Grimes	3 – Tied	Viejas Arena (11,358); San Diego, CA
January 20, 2018; 1:00 pm, ATTSNRM		at Air Force; Postponed due to government shutdown Make up date 2/26/18						Clune Arena; Colorado Springs, CO
January 23, 2018; 8:00 pm, CBSSN		UNLV	W 69–63	15–6 (5–3)	20 – Williams	6 – Tied	4 – Williams	Save Mart Center (5,385); Fresno, CA
January 27, 2018; 4:00 pm		Utah State	L 62–65	15–7 (5–4)	15 – D. Taylor	11 – Hopkins	4 – Hopkins	Save Mart Center (7,317); Fresno, CA
January 31, 2018; 8:00 pm, CBSSN		at Nevada	L 92–102	15–8 (5–5)	30 – D. Taylor	8 – Hopkins	5 – Hopkins	Lawlor Events Center (8,521); Reno, NV
February 3, 2018; 11:00 am, ATTSNRM		at Wyoming	W 80–62	16–8 (6–5)	20 – Grimes	12 – Grimes	6 – Hopkins	Arena-Auditorium (5,690); Laramie, WY
February 6, 2018; 8:00 pm, CBSSN		San Diego State	W 79–61	17–8 (7–5)	20 – Hopkins	6 – Grimes	5 – Hopkins	Save Mart Center (6,128); Fresno, CA
February 14, 2018; 7:00 pm		at San Jose State	W 77–57	18–8 (8–5)	20 – Hopkins	7 – Tied	4 – Hopkins	Event Center Arena (1,682); San Jose, CA
February 17, 2018; 4:00 pm, ESPN3		Colorado State	W 86–65	19–8 (9–5)	19 – Williams	10 – Williams	6 – Hopkins	Save Mart Center (6,882); Fresno, CA
February 21, 2018; 7:00 pm, ESPN3		at UNLV	W 77–64	20–8 (10–5)	22 – D. Taylor	9 – Hopkins	4 – Hopkins	Thomas & Mack Center (9,302); Paradise, NV
February 24, 2018; 7:00 pm, ESPNU		Wyoming	L 68–78	20–9 (10–6)	16 – Tied	10 – Grimes	4 – J. Taylor	Save Mart Center (9,645); Fresno, CA
February 26, 2018; 6:00 pm		at Air Force	W 54–48	21–9 (11–6)	15 – Williams	8 – Williams	4 – D. Taylor	Clune Arena (2,150); Colorado Springs, CO
March 3, 2018; 6:00 pm, ESPN3		at New Mexico	L 86–95 ^{OT}	21–10 (11–7)	23 – Tied	8 – Williams	2 – Tied	The Pit (13,069); Albuquerque, NM
Mountain West tournament
March 8, 2018; 2:30 pm, CBSSN	(4)	vs. (5) San Diego State; Quarterfinals	L 52–64	21–11	23 – Williams	9 – Williams	2 – Tied	Thomas & Mack Center (6,753); Paradise, NV
*Non-conference game. ^{#}Rankings from AP Poll. (#) Tournament seedings in parentheses. All times are in Pacific Time.
