= 2017–18 San Jose State Spartans men's basketball team =

American college basketball season

2017–18 San Jose State Spartans men's basketball
- Conference: Mountain West Conference
- Record: 4–26 (1–17 MW)
- Head coach: Jean Prioleau (1st season)
- Assistant coaches: Ryan Cooper; Will Kimble; Jay Morris
- Home arena: Event Center Arena (Capacity: 5,000)

2017–18 Mountain West Conference men's basketball standings
	Conf.				Overall
Team	W		L	PCT	W		L	PCT
No. 24 Nevada	15	–	3	.833	29	–	8	.784
Boise State	13	–	5	.722	23	–	9	.719
New Mexico	12	–	6	.667	19	–	15	.559
Fresno State	11	–	7	.611	21	–	11	.656
San Diego State †	11	–	7	.611	22	–	11	.667
Wyoming	10	–	8	.556	20	–	13	.606
UNLV	8	–	10	.444	20	–	13	.606
Utah State	8	–	10	.444	17	–	17	.500
Air Force	6	–	12	.333	12	–	19	.387
Colorado State	4	–	14	.222	11	–	21	.344
San Jose State	1	–	17	.056	4	–	26	.133
† Conference tournament winner Rankings from AP poll

The 2017–18 San Jose State Spartans men's basketball team represented San Jose State University in the 2017–18 NCAA Division I men's basketball season. Led by first-year head coach Jean Prioleau, the Spartans played their home games at the Event Center Arena as members of the Mountain West Conference. They finished the season 4–26, 1–17 in Mountain West play to finish in last place. They lost in the first round of the Mountain West tournament to Wyoming.

== Previous season ==
The Spartans finished the 2016–17 season 14–16, 7–11 in MW play to finish in eighth place. They lost to Utah State in the first round of the Mountain West tournament.

On July 10, 2017 Dave Wojcik resigned as head coach for personal reasons. On August 4, the school hired Jean Prioleau as head coach.

== Off-season ==
=== Departures ===
Name	Number	Pos.	Height	Weight	Year	Hometown	Notes
E.J. Boyce	11	G	6'2"	170	Sophomore	Boise, ID	Transferred to Saint Martin's
Terrell Brown	0	G	6'2"	160	Freshman	Hayward, CA	Dismissed due to robbery
Brandon Clarke	15	F	6'8"	205	Sophomore	Phoenix, AZ	Transferred to Gonzaga
Brandon Mitchell	4	F	6'6"	210	Junior	Memphis, TN	Switched to football
Cody Schwartz	33	F	6'8"	210	Sophomore	De Pere, WI	Transferred to Green Bay
Isaac Thornton	20	G	6'2"	185	Senior	San Antonio, TX	Graduated
Gary Williams, Jr.	2	G	6'5"	215	Senior	Vallejo, CA	Graduated

=== Incoming transfers ===
Name	Number	Pos.	Height	Weight	Year	Hometown	Notes
Oumar Barry	13	C	6'11"	230	Junior	Conakry, Guinea	Transferred from Iowa Western CC

=== 2017 recruiting class ===
College recruiting
Name	Hometown	School	Height	Weight	Commit date
Noah Baumann; G/F	Phoenix, Arizona	Desert Vista HS	6 ft 5 in (1.96 m)	180 lb (82 kg)	Jun 13, 2016
Noah Baumann; G/F	Recruit ratings: Scout: Rivals: 247Sports: ESPN:				
Overall recruit ranking: Scout: – Rivals: –
Note: In many cases, Scout, Rivals, 247Sports, On3, and ESPN may conflict in their listings of height and weight.; In these cases, the average was taken. ESPN grades are on a 100-point scale.; Sources: "2017 San Jose State Basketball Recruiting Commits". Scout.; "Scout.com Team Recruiting Rankings". Scout.; "2017 Team Ranking". Rivals.

== Preseason ==
In a vote by conference media at the Mountain West media day, the Spartans were picked to finish in 10th place in the Mountain West.

== Roster ==
2017–18 San Jose State Spartans men's basketball team
Players
Coaches

Pos.	#	Name	Height	Weight	Year	Previous school	Hometown
G	2	Nai Carlisle	6 ft 2 in (1.88 m)	200 lb (91 kg)	RS Fr	West Lafayette HS	West Lafayette, Indiana
F	4	Walter Graves III (redshirt)	6 ft 7 in (2.01 m)	192 lb (87 kg)	Fr	Clovis North HS	Clovis, California
F	5	Keith Fisher III	6 ft 8 in (2.03 m)	215 lb (98 kg)	RS Fr	Westchester HS	Los Angeles, California
G	10	Isaiah Nichols	6 ft 5 in (1.96 m)	180 lb (82 kg)	So	Santa Clara HS	Oxnard, California
G	11	Ryan Parilla	5 ft 10 in (1.78 m)	160 lb (73 kg)	Fr	James Logan HS	Union City, California
G	12	Caleb Simmons	6 ft 6 in (1.98 m)	195 lb (88 kg)	Fr	Desert Vista HS	Vallejo, California
C	13	Oumar Barry	6 ft 11 in (2.11 m)	230 lb (104 kg)	Jr	Iowa Western CC	Conakry, Guinea
G/F	20	Noah Baumann	6 ft 5 in (1.96 m)	180 lb (82 kg)	Fr	Desert Vista HS	Phoenix, Arizona
G	21	Jalen James	6 ft 4 in (1.93 m)	175 lb (79 kg)	Sr	La Lumiere HS	Chicago, Illinois
F	24	Ryan Singer	6 ft 10 in (2.08 m)	235 lb (107 kg)	RS Jr	Massanutten Military Academy	Littleton, Colorado
G	25	Jaycee Hillsman	6 ft 6 in (1.98 m)	213 lb (97 kg)	Jr	Simeon Career Academy	Champaign, Illinois
F	32	Ryan Welage	6 ft 9 in (2.06 m)	205 lb (93 kg)	Jr	Greensburg HS	Greensburg, Indiana
C	41	Ashtin Chastain	6 ft 11 in (2.11 m)	245 lb (111 kg)	RS So	Norco HS	Norco, California

Head coach

- Jean Prioleau (Fordham)

Assistant coach(es)

- Ryan Cooper (Notre Dame de Namur)
- Will Kimble (Pepperdine)
- Jay Morris (CSU Dominguez Hills)

Legend

- (C) Team captain
- (S) Suspended
- (I) Ineligible
- (W) Walk-on
- Injured
- Current redshirt

Roster

== Schedule and results ==
Date time, TV	Rank^{#}	Opponent^{#}	Result	Record	High points	High rebounds	High assists	Site (attendance) city, state
Exhibition
October 29, 2017*; 2:00 p.m.		Dominican	W 95–61	–	16 – Hillsman	7 – Tied	6 – Baumann	Event Center Arena (1,424); San Jose, CA
November 5, 2017*; 5:00 p.m.		Notre Dame de Namur	W 90–40	–	16 – Tied	9 – Welage	4 – Tied	Event Center Arena (1,660); San Jose, CA
Non-conference regular season
November 10, 2017*; 7:00 p.m.		Antelope Valley	W 97–45	1–0	30 – Welage	10 – Nichols	6 – Nichols	Event Center Arena (1,343); San Jose, CA
November 12, 2017*; 2:00 p.m.		San Diego	L 64–81	1–1	17 – Welage	8 – Nichols	4 – Baumann	Event Center Arena (1,433); San Jose, CA
November 16, 2017*; 5:30 p.m., Pluto TV		at Southern Utah	L 69–81	1–2	21 – Welage	7 – Tied	3 – Hillsman	America First Events Center (1,515); Cedar City, UT
November 19, 2017*; 5:00 p.m., Stadium		No. 21 Saint Mary's	L 61–79	1–3	20 – Welage	6 – Nichols	4 – Tied	Event Center Arena (2,377); San Jose, CA
November 22, 2017*; 7:00 p.m.		Idaho State	W 62–54	2–3	15 – Hillsman	8 – Chastain	4 – Carlisle	Event Center Arena (1,278); San Jose, CA
November 29, 2017*; 4:00 p.m., ESPN3		at Bowling Green	L 79–85	2–4	23 – Welage	11 – Fisher III	5 – Carlisle	Stroh Center (1,635); Bowling Green, OH
December 2, 2017*; 1:00 p.m., ESPN3		at Southern Illinois; MW–MVC Challenge	L 58–76	2–5	15 – Hillsman	7 – Fisher III	2 – Tied	SIU Arena (4,026); Carbondale, IL
December 5, 2017*; 6:00 p.m., Altitude		at Denver	L 56–58	2–6	12 – Welage	8 – Nichols	4 – Carlisle	Magness Arena (1,028); Denver, CO
December 10, 2017*; 7:00 p.m., TheW.tv		at Portland	L 55–64	2–7	21 – Welage	6 – Tied	2 – Tied	Chiles Center (2,098); Portland, OR
December 17, 2017*; 2:00 p.m.		South Dakota	L 62–76	2–8	17 – Mitchell	8 – Fisher III	2 – Tied	Event Center Arena (1,424); San Jose, CA
December 21, 2017*; 7:00 p.m., TheW.tv		at Santa Clara; Cable Car Classic	W 75–63	3–8	21 – Welage	13 – Fisher III	4 – Tied	Leavey Center (2,406); Santa Clara, CA
Mountain West regular season
December 27, 2017; 6:00 p.m.		at Utah State	L 72–86	3–9 (0–1)	22 – Welage	8 – Welage	3 – Tied	Smith Spectrum (6,759); Logan, UT
December 30, 2017; 2:00 p.m.		Colorado State	L 52–59	3–10 (0–2)	16 – Welage	10 – Fisher III	3 – Fisher III	Event Center Arena (1,385); San Jose, CA
January 3, 2018; 8:00 p.m., AT&TSN		UNLV	L 76–82 ^{OT}	3–11 (0–3)	23 – Welage	6 – Welage	4 – Carlisle	Event Center Arena (1,376); San Jose, CA
January 6, 2018; 6:00 p.m.		at New Mexico	L 47–80	3–12 (0–4)	17 – Welage	7 – Tied	3 – Nichols	The Pit (10,799); Albuquerque, NM
January 9, 2018; 8:00 p.m., CBSSN		at San Diego State	L 49–85	3–13 (0–5)	14 – Fisher III	8 – Welage	1 – 4 tied	Viejas Arena (11,761); San Diego, CA
January 13, 2018; 2:00 p.m.		Air Force	L 71–78	3–14 (0–6)	17 – Welage	8 – Welage	4 – James	Event Center Arena (1,405); San Jose, CA
January 17, 2018; 7:30 p.m., CBSSN		Nevada	L 54–71	3–15 (0–7)	18 – Mitchell	7 – Mitchell	2 – 3 tied	Event Center Arena (1,738); San Jose, CA
January 24, 2018; 7:00 p.m., AT&TSN		at Boise State	L 71–94	3–16 (0–8)	22 – Welage	7 – Welage	5 – Hillsman	Taco Bell Arena (7,378); Boise, ID
January 27, 2018; 2:00 p.m.		Wyoming	L 86–90 ^{OT}	3–17 (0–9)	37 – Welage	9 – James	8 – James	Event Center Arena (1,742); San Jose, CA
January 31, 2018; 8:00 p.m., AT&TSN		at UNLV	L 67–76	3–18 (0–10)	21 – Welage	6 – Fisher III	5 – Baumann	Thomas & Mack Center (11,344); Paradise, NV
February 3, 2018; 3:00 p.m., AT&TSN		New Mexico	L 68–71	3–19 (0–11)	22 – Welage	11 – Hillsman	5 – James	Event Center Arena (2,151); San Jose, CA
February 10, 2018; 1:00 p.m.		at Colorado State	L 79–90	3–20 (0–12)	23 – Fisher III	9 – Fisher III	5 – James	Moby Arena (2,984); Fort Collins, CO
February 14, 2018; 7:00 p.m.		Fresno State; Rivalry	L 57–77	3–21 (0–13)	17 – Fisher III	13 – Fisher III	4 – Hillsman	Event Center Arena (1,682); San Jose, CA
February 17, 2018; 1:00 p.m.		at Wyoming	L 75–89	3–22 (0–14)	26 – Fisher III	10 – Tied	3 – Hillsman	Arena-Auditorium (5,731); Laramie, WY
February 21, 2018; 7:00 p.m., ESPN3		at No. 20 Nevada	L 67–80	3–23 (0–15)	22 – Welage	9 – Welage	3 – 4 tied	Lawlor Events Center (8,096); Reno, NV
February 24, 2018; 7:00 p.m., ESPN3		San Diego State	L 59–71	3–24 (0–16)	21 – Fisher III	8 – Welage	5 – Hillsman	Event Center Arena (2,642); San Jose, CA
February 28, 2018; 7:00 p.m.		Utah State	W 64–62	4–24 (1–16)	19 – Hillsman	9 – Fisher III	2 – 3 tied	Event Center Arena (1,761); San Jose, CA
March 3, 2018; 1:00 p.m.		at Air Force	L 61–83	4–25 (1–17)	18 – Fisher III	8 – Fisher III	3 – Tied	Clune Arena (3,018); Colorado Springs, CO
Mountain West tournament
March 7, 2018; 4:00 p.m., Stadium	(11)	vs. (6) Wyoming; First round	L 61–74	4–26	25 – Welage	5 – Tied	4 – Hillsman	Thomas & Mack Center (4,994); Paradise, NV
*Non-conference game. ^{#}Rankings from AP Poll. (#) Tournament seedings in parentheses. All times are in Pacific Time.

All games where a television provider is not indicated are televised on the Mountain West Network.
