= Brian Dutcher =

American basketball coach (born 1959)

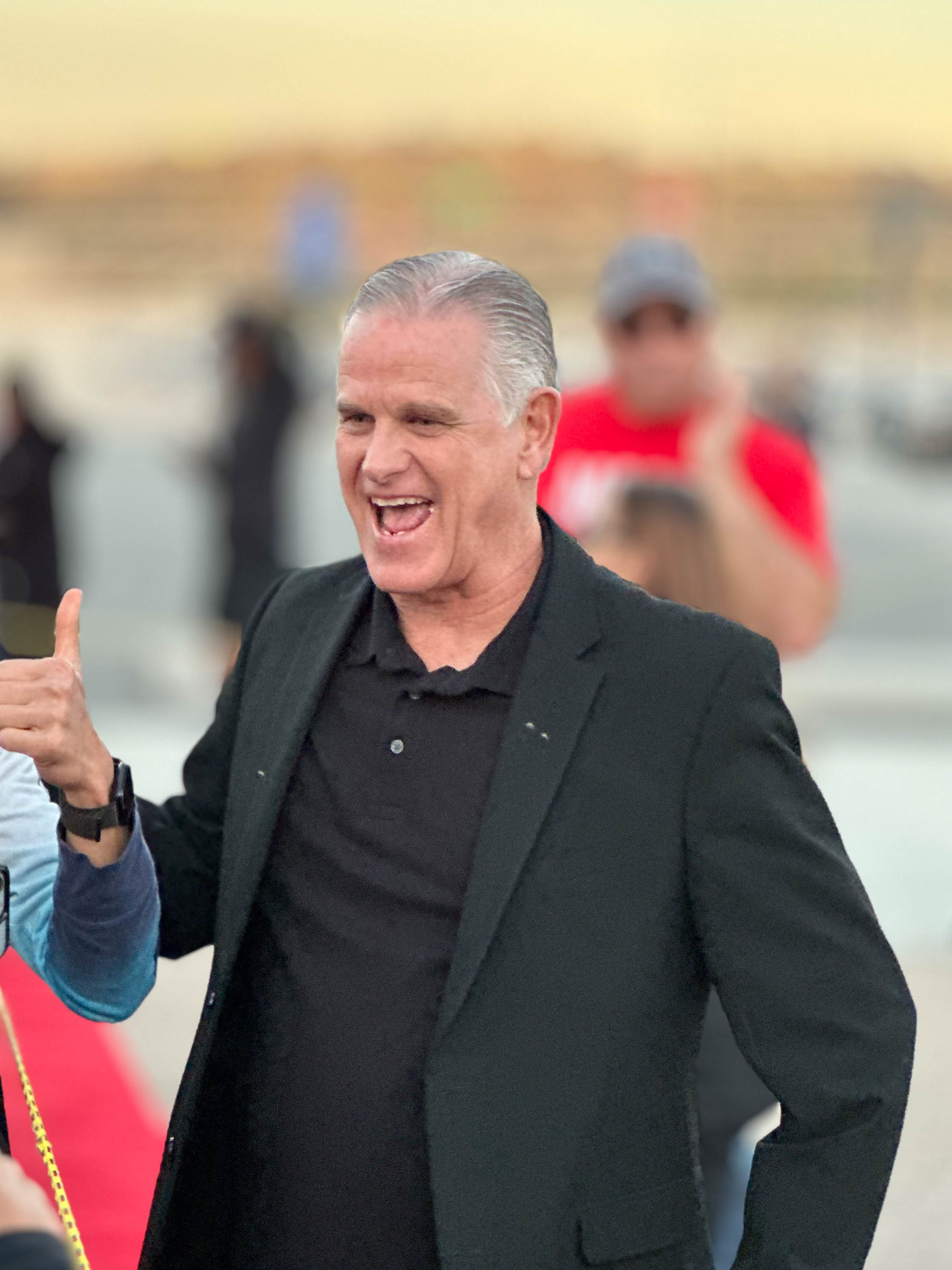
- Dutcher posing for a picture in 2023

Current position
- Title: Head coach
- Team: San Diego State
- Conference: Pac-12
- Record: 225–79 (.740)

Biographical details
- Born: October 30, 1959 (age 67); Alpena, Michigan, U.S.
- Education: Minnesota ('82)

Coaching career (HC unless noted)
- 1983–1985: Illinois (GA)
- 1986–1988: South Dakota State (assistant)
- 1989–1998: Michigan (associate HC)
- 1999–2017: San Diego State (associate HC)
- 2017–present: San Diego State

Head coaching record
- Overall: 225–79 (.740)
- Tournaments: 7–6 (NCAA Division I); 17–5 (Mountain West)

Accomplishments and honors

Championships
- NCAA Division I Regional – Final Four (2023); 3 MW tournament (2018, 2021, 2023); 3 MW regular season (2020, 2021, 2023)

Awards
- 2× MW Coach of the Year (2020, 2021)

Brian James Dutcher (born October 30, 1959) is an American college basketball coach who is the head coach of the San Diego State Aztecs men's basketball team at San Diego State University (SDSU). He was an assistant under head coach Steve Fisher with the Michigan Wolverines and San Diego State, succeeding Fisher as the Aztecs' head coach upon his retirement in 2017.

== Coaching career ==
Dutcher has more than 30 years of coaching experience, including 18 seasons as an assistant to Steve Fisher at San Diego State preceded by nine at the University of Michigan. He joined then-interim coach Fisher in 1989 when Michigan won the national championship. Dutcher is credited for having a central role in recruiting the Fab Five to Michigan and for bringing Kawhi Leonard to San Diego State. He was named San Diego State's "head coach in waiting" in 2011. Following Fisher's decision to retire, Dutcher was formally named as his replacement on April 11, 2017.

Thanks to Dutcher bringing in transfers Malachi Flynn, Yanni Wetzell, K.J. Feagin, and Trey Pulliam, along with the development of returnees Matt Mitchell, Jordan Shackel, Nathan Mensah, and Adam Seiko, the Aztecs started the 2019–20 season 26–0, with impressive road/neutral site wins over BYU, Creighton, Iowa, and Utah State - the preseason Mountain West favorite. This resulted in a #4 ranking for five straight weeks for San Diego State while Dutcher was named to the Naismith Coach of the Year Late-Season Watch List. Dutcher was named Mountain West Conference Coach of the Year on March 3, 2020.

== Personal life ==
Dutcher and his wife, Jan, have two daughters: Erin and Liza. He is the son of Jim Dutcher, a former head coach at Eastern Michigan and Minnesota.

== Head coaching record ==
Record table
Season	Team	Overall	Conference	Standing	Postseason
San Diego State Aztecs (Mountain West Conference) (2017–2026)
2017–18	San Diego State	22–11	11–7	T–4th	NCAA Division I Round of 64
2018–19	San Diego State	21–13	11–7	T–4th	
2019–20	San Diego State	30–2	17–1	1st	NCAA Tournament Canceled*
2020–21	San Diego State	23–5	14–3	1st	NCAA Division I Round of 64
2021–22	San Diego State	23–9	13–4	3rd	NCAA Division I Round of 64
2022–23	San Diego State	32–7	15–3	1st	NCAA Division I Runner-up
2023–24	San Diego State	26–11	11–7	5th	NCAA Division I Sweet 16
2024–25	San Diego State	21–10	14–6	T–4th	NCAA Division I First Four
2025–26	San Diego State	22–11	14–6	2nd	
San Diego State Aztecs (Pac-12 Conference) (2026–present)
2026–27	San Diego State	5–0	0–0		
San Diego State:		225–79 (.740)	125–42 (.749)		
Total:		225–79 (.740)			
National champion Postseason invitational champion Conference regular season champion Conference regular season and conference tournament champion Division regular season champion Division regular season and conference tournament champion Conference tournament champion

*The 2020 NCAA tournament was canceled due to concerns over the coronavirus pandemic.
