= 2017–18 Wyoming Cowboys basketball team =

American college basketball season

2017–18 Wyoming Cowboys basketball
- Conference: Mountain West Conference
- Record: 20–13 (10–8 MW)
- Head coach: Allen Edwards (2nd season)
- Assistant coaches: Jeremy Shyatt; Tony Pujol; Jermaine Kimbrough
- Home arena: Arena-Auditorium

2017–18 Mountain West Conference men's basketball standings
	Conf.				Overall
Team	W		L	PCT	W		L	PCT
No. 24 Nevada	15	–	3	.833	29	–	8	.784
Boise State	13	–	5	.722	23	–	9	.719
New Mexico	12	–	6	.667	19	–	15	.559
Fresno State	11	–	7	.611	21	–	11	.656
San Diego State †	11	–	7	.611	22	–	11	.667
Wyoming	10	–	8	.556	20	–	13	.606
UNLV	8	–	10	.444	20	–	13	.606
Utah State	8	–	10	.444	17	–	17	.500
Air Force	6	–	12	.333	12	–	19	.387
Colorado State	4	–	14	.222	11	–	21	.344
San Jose State	1	–	17	.056	4	–	26	.133
† Conference tournament winner Rankings from AP poll

The 2017–18 Wyoming Cowboys basketball team represented the University of Wyoming during the 2017–18 NCAA Division I men's basketball season. They were led by Allen Edwards in his second year as head coach at Wyoming. The Cowboys played their home games at the Arena-Auditorium in Laramie, Wyoming as members of the Mountain West Conference. They finished the season 20–13, 10–8 in Mountain West play to finish in sixth place. They defeated San Jose State in the first round of the Mountain West tournament before losing in the quarterfinals to New Mexico. Despite having 20 wins, they did not participate in a postseason tournament.

== Previous season ==
The Cowboys finished the 2016–17 season 23–15, 8–10 in Mountain West play to finish in seventh place. They lost in the first round of the Mountain West tournament to Air Force. They were invited to the College Basketball Invitational (CBI) where they defeated Eastern Washington, UMKC, and Utah Valley to advance to the best-of-three championship series against Coastal Carolina. They defeated Coastal Carolina two-games-to-one to win the CBI championship. The Cowboys were the second consecutive Mountain West team to win the CBI after Nevada did so in 2016.

== Offseason ==
=== Departures ===
Name	Number	Pos.	Height	Weight	Year	Hometown	Reason for departure
Jeremy Lieberman	11	G	6'1"	175	Junior	Calabasas, CA	Graduate transferred to California Baptist
Jonathan Barnes	21	C	6'10"	245	Junior	Parker, CO	Graduate transferred to UC–Colorado Springs
Jason McManamen	23	G	6'5"	195	RS Senior	Torrington, WY	Graduated
Morris Marshall	25	G	6'4"	180	Senior	White Springs, FL	Graduated

=== 2017 recruiting class ===
College recruiting information
Name	Hometown	School	Height	Weight	Commit date
Hunter Thompson #38 PF	Pine Bluffs, WY	Pine Bluffs High School	6 ft 9 in (2.06 m)	225 lb (102 kg)	Sep 6, 2016
Hunter Thompson #38 PF	Recruit ratings: Scout: Rivals: 247Sports: ESPN:				
Anthony Mack #72 SF	Blairstown, NJ	Blair Academy	6 ft 5 in (1.96 m)	215 lb (98 kg)	Nov 2, 2016
Anthony Mack #72 SF	Recruit ratings: Scout: Rivals: 247Sports: ESPN:				
Hunter Maldonado #98 SF	Colorado Springs, CO	Vista Ridge HS	6 ft 5 in (1.96 m)	180 lb (82 kg)	Jun 6, 2016
Hunter Maldonado #98 SF	Recruit ratings: Scout: Rivals: 247Sports: ESPN:				
Overall recruit ranking: Scout: – Rivals: –
Note: In many cases, Scout, Rivals, 247Sports, On3, and ESPN may conflict in their listings of height and weight.; In these cases, the average was taken. ESPN grades are on a 100-point scale.; Sources: "ESPN – Wyoming Cowboys Basketball Recruiting 2017". ESPN.; "2017 Team Ranking". Rivals.

== Preseason ==
In a vote by conference media at the Mountain West media day, the Cowboys were picked to finish in seventh place in the Mountain West.

== Roster ==
2017–18 Wyoming Cowboys men's basketball team
Players
Coaches

Pos.	#	Name	Height	Weight	Year	Previous school	Hometown
G	0	Nyaires Redding	6 ft 2 in (1.88 m)	166 lb (75 kg)	RS Jr	Westwind Prep; Washington State	Solon, OH
G	1	Justin James	6 ft 7 in (2.01 m)	180 lb (82 kg)	Jr	Oldsmar Christian HS	Port Saint Lucie, FL
F	2	Andrew Moemeka	6 ft 8 in (2.03 m)	210 lb (95 kg)	RS So	Oldsmar Christian HS	Lake City, FL
G	3	Alexander Aka Gorski	6 ft 5 in (1.96 m)	205 lb (93 kg)	Sr	Sunrise Christian Academy	Lund, Sweden
F	5	Alan Herndon	6 ft 9 in (2.06 m)	210 lb (95 kg)	RS Sr	Widefield HS	Colorado Springs, CO
F	5	Hunter Thompson	6 ft 10 in (2.08 m)	225 lb (102 kg)	Fr	Pine Bluffs HS	Pine Bluffs, WY
G	10	Cody Kelly (W)	5 ft 11 in (1.8 m)	180 lb (82 kg)	RS So	Campbell County HS	Gillette, WY
G	12	Hunter Maldonado	6 ft 7 in (2.01 m)	185 lb (84 kg)	Fr	Vista Ridge HS	Colorado Springs, SO
G	13	Sam Averbuck (W)	6 ft 4 in (1.93 m)	185 lb (84 kg)	RS So	Suffield Academy	Santa Rosa, CA
F	14	Austin Mueller	6 ft 6 in (1.98 m)	200 lb (91 kg)	RS Fr	ThunderRidge HS	Highlands Ranch, CO
F	15	Brodricks Jones	6 ft 10 in (2.08 m)	220 lb (100 kg)	RS So	Lawndale HS; UTEP	Los Angeles, CA
F	20	Hayden Dalton	6 ft 8 in (2.03 m)	185 lb (84 kg)	Sr	Chaparral HS; Central Wyoming College	Parker, CO
G	24	Louis Adams	6 ft 4 in (1.93 m)	185 lb (84 kg)	Sr	Orr Academy HS; Odessa College	Chicago, IL
G	25	Anthony Mack	6 ft 6 in (1.98 m)	218 lb (99 kg)	Fr	Blair Academy	Las Vegas, NV
F	33	Jordan Naughton	6 ft 10 in (2.08 m)	225 lb (102 kg)	Jr	Etiwanda HS	Rancho Cucamonga, CA

Head coach

- Allen Edwards (Kentucky)

Assistant coach(es)

- Jeremy Shyatt (Clemson)
- Tony Pujol (Sterling (KS))
- Jermaine Kimbrough (Virginia Tech)

Legend

- (C) Team captain
- (S) Suspended
- (I) Ineligible
- (W) Walk-on
- Injured
- Current redshirt

Roster
Last update: 10/17/17

== Statistics ==
Player	GP	GS	MPG	FG%	3FG%	FT%	RPG	APG	BPG	SPG	PPG
Louis Adams	31	3	19.2	.479	.426	.705	2.6	1.5	0.3	0.6	9.7
Alexander Aka Gorski	31	11	22.5	.344	.288	.744	1.9	1.0	0.0	0.4	6.8
Sam Averbuck	10	0	3.1	.000	.000	.000	0.3	0.2	0.0	0.1	0.0
Hayden Dalton	33	33	33.3	.458	.403	.838	7.8	2.6	0.5	0.9	17.7
Alan Herndon	33	32	31.9	.512	.336	.609	5.7	2.0	2.2	0.8	11.8
Justin James	32	32	31.2	.472	.308	.726	6.0	3.1	0.5	1.1	18.9
Brodricks Jones	15	0	4.6	.167	.125	1.000	0.4	0.2	0.0	0.0	0.7
Cody Kelley	33	23	23.2	.390	.351	.641	2.4	2.9	0.0	0.9	5.2
Hunter Maldonado	29	19	21.2	.388	.304	.735	2.2	1.4	0.2	1.0	5.3
Andrew Moemeka	29	3	10.7	.541	.000	.684	2.2	0.2	0.3	0.5	1.8
Austin Mueller	13	0	6.5	.556	.500	1.000	0.5	0.1	0.1	0.1	1.1
Jordan Naughton	9	0	6.9	.571	.000	.667	1.2	0.0	0.1	0.1	2.0
Nyaires Redding	32	9	13.9	.359	.394	.877	1.0	1.3	0.0	0.5	3.7

== Schedule and results ==
Date time, TV	Rank^{#}	Opponent^{#}	Result	Record	Site (attendance) city, state
Exhibition
Nov 3, 2017*; 8:30 pm		Regis	W 75–65		Arena-Auditorium (6,058); Laramie, WY
Non-conference regular season
Nov 10, 2017*; 7:00 pm		Chattanooga; Cayman Islands Classic	W 74–65	1–0	Arena-Auditorium (5,056); Laramie, WY
Nov 13, 2017*; 9:00 pm, P12N		at Oregon State	W 75–66	2–0	Gill Coliseum (3,874); Corvallis, OR
Nov 20, 2017*; 12:30 pm		vs. South Dakota State; Cayman Islands Classic quarterfinals	W 77–65	3–0	John Gray Gymnasium (900); George Town, Cayman Islands
Nov 21, 2017*; 12:30 pm		vs. Louisiana; Cayman Islands Classic semifinals	W 70–61	4–0	John Gray Gymnasium (654); George Town, Cayman Islands
Nov 22, 2017*; 5:30 pm		vs. No. 12 Cincinnati; Cayman Islands Classic championship game	L 53–78	4–1	John Gray Gymnasium (1,530); George Town, Cayman Islands
Nov 26, 2017*; 4:00 pm		New Mexico Highlands	W 83–70	5–1	Arena-Auditorium (4,205); Laramie, WY
Nov 29, 2017*; 7:00 pm		at Denver	L 78–88	5–2	Magness Arena (1,662); Denver, CO
Dec 2, 2017*; 4:00 pm		Drake; MW–MWC Challenge	W 96–89 ^{2OT}	6–2	Arena-Auditorium (4,853); Laramie, WY
Dec 6, 2017*; 5:00 pm, SECN+		at South Carolina	L 64–80	6–3	Colonial Life Arena (10,205); Columbia, SC
Dec 9, 2017*; 4:00 pm		Pacific	W 86–72	7–3	Arena-Auditorium (4,606); Laramie, WY
Dec 12, 2017*; 7:00 pm		Eastern Washington	W 93–88 ^{OT}	8–3	Arena-Auditorium (4,363); Laramie, WY
Dec 16, 2017*; 8:00 pm		Texas Southern	W 72–66	9–3	Arena-Auditorium (4,487); Laramie, WY
Dec 19, 2017*; 7:00 pm		Northern Colorado	L 84–91	9–4	Arena-Auditorium (4,289); Laramie, WY
Mountain West regular season
Dec 27, 2017; 7:00 pm, ESPN3		San Diego State	W 82–69	10–4 (1–0)	Arena-Auditorium (4,823); Laramie, WY
Jan 3, 2018; 8:30 pm, CBSSN		at Nevada	L 83–92	10–5 (1–1)	Lawlor Events Center (9,188); Reno, NV
Jan 6, 2018; 6:00 pm, ATTSNRM		Boise State	W 79–78 ^{OT}	11–5 (2–1)	Arena-Auditorium (5,301); Laramie, WY
Jan 10, 2018; 7:00 pm, Stadium		at New Mexico	L 66–75	11–6 (2–2)	The Pit (9,846); Albuquerque, NM
Jan 13, 2018; 2:00 pm, CBSSN		Colorado State; Border War	L 73–78	11–7 (2–3)	Arena-Auditorium (7,014); Laramie, WY
Jan 20, 2018; 7:00 pm		at Utah State	W 85–77	12–7 (3–3)	Smith Spectrum (7,148); Logan, UT
Jan 24, 2018; 9:00 pm, ESPNU		No. 23 Nevada	W 104–103 ^{2OT}	13–7 (4–3)	Arena-Auditorium (5,017); Laramie, WY
Jan 27, 2018; 3:00 pm		at San Jose State	W 90–86 ^{OT}	14–7 (5–3)	Event Center Arena (1,742); San Jose, CA
Jan 31, 2018; 7:00 pm, ATTSNRM		at Colorado State; Border War	W 91–86 ^{2OT}	15–7 (6–3)	Moby Arena (4,177); Fort Collins, CO
Feb 3, 2018; 12:00 pm, ATTSNRM		Fresno State	L 62–80	15–8 (6–4)	Arena-Auditorium (5,690); Laramie, WY
Feb 7, 2018; 7:00 pm		Utah State	W 83–65	16–8 (7–4)	Arena-Auditorium (4,672); Laramie, WY
Feb 10, 2018; 6:00 pm, CBSSN		at UNLV	L 70–85	16–9 (7–5)	Thomas & Mack Center (11,421); Paradise, NV
Feb 14, 2018; 9:00 pm, CBSSN		at San Diego State	L 77–87	16–10 (7–6)	Viejas Arena (10,494); San Diego, CA
Feb 17, 2018; 2:00 pm		San Jose State	W 89–75	17–10 (8–6)	Arena-Auditorium (5,731); Laramie, WY
Feb 20, 2018; 7:00 pm, ATTSNRM		New Mexico	L 114–119	17–11 (8–7)	Arena-Auditorium (4,321); Laramie, WY
Feb 24, 2018; 8:00 pm, ESPNU		at Fresno State	W 78–68	18–11 (9–7)	Save Mart Center (9,645); Fresno, CA
Feb 28, 2018; 7:00 pm		Air Force	W 66–54	19–11 (10–7)	Arena-Auditorium (5,731); Laramie, WY
Mar 3, 2018; 5:00 pm, ATTSNRM		at Boise State	W 95–87	19–12 (10–8)	Taco Bell Arena (10,303); Boise, ID
Mountain West tournament
Mar 7, 2018; 4:00 pm, Stadium	(6)	vs. (11) San Jose State; First round	W 74–61	20–12	Thomas & Mack Center (4,994); Paradise, NV
Mar 8, 2018; 9:30 pm, CBSSN	(6)	vs. (3) New Mexico; Quarterfinals	L 75–85	20–13	Thomas & Mack Center (7,138); Paradise, NV
*Non-conference game. ^{#}Rankings from AP Poll. (#) Tournament seedings in parentheses. All times are in Mountain Time.
