= 2017–18 San Diego State Aztecs men's basketball team =

American college basketball season

2017–18 San Diego State Aztecs men's basketball

Mountain West tournament champions

NCAA tournament, First Round
- Conference: Mountain West Conference
- Record: 22–11 (11–7 MW)
- Head coach: Brian Dutcher (1st season)
- Assistant coaches: Justin Hutson; Dave Velasquez; Tim Shelton
- Home arena: Viejas Arena (Capacity: 12,414)

2017–18 Mountain West Conference men's basketball standings
	Conf.				Overall
Team	W		L	PCT	W		L	PCT
No. 24 Nevada	15	–	3	.833	29	–	8	.784
Boise State	13	–	5	.722	23	–	9	.719
New Mexico	12	–	6	.667	19	–	15	.559
Fresno State	11	–	7	.611	21	–	11	.656
San Diego State †	11	–	7	.611	22	–	11	.667
Wyoming	10	–	8	.556	20	–	13	.606
UNLV	8	–	10	.444	20	–	13	.606
Utah State	8	–	10	.444	17	–	17	.500
Air Force	6	–	12	.333	12	–	19	.387
Colorado State	4	–	14	.222	11	–	21	.344
San Jose State	1	–	17	.056	4	–	26	.133
† Conference tournament winner Rankings from AP poll

The 2017–18 San Diego State men's basketball team represented San Diego State University during the 2017–18 NCAA Division I men's basketball season. The Aztecs, led by first-year head coach Brian Dutcher, played their home games at Viejas Arena as members in the Mountain West Conference. They finished the season 22–11, 11–7 in Mountain West play to finish in a tie for fourth place. They defeated Fresno State, Nevada, and New Mexico to become champions of the Mountain West tournament. As a result, they received the Mountain West's automatic bid to the NCAA tournament. As the No. 11 seed in the West region, they lost to Houston in the first round.

== Previous season ==
The Aztecs finished the season 19–14, 9–9 in Mountain West play to finish in a tie for fifth place. They defeated UNLV and Boise State to advance to the semifinals of the Mountain West tournament where they lost to Colorado State. They Aztecs did not participate in a postseason tournament for the first time since the 2004–05 season.

On April 11, 2017, head coach Steve Fisher announced his retirement after 18 seasons at San Diego State and 27 seasons overall as NCAA head coach, handing over the head coaching job to his longtime assistant Brian Dutcher.

== Offseason ==
=== Departures ===
Name	Number	Pos.	Height	Weight	Year	Hometown	Reason for departure
Ben Perez	2	G	6'3"	175	Sophomore	San Marcos, CA	Walk-on; transferred to South Plains College
Dakarai Allen	4	G	6'5"	200	Senior	Sacramento, CA	Graduated, now plays in NBA G League
D'Erryl Williams	11	G	6'3"	205	Senior	Sacramento, CA	Graduated
Emmanuel Wilson	12	G	6'2"	185	RS Freshman	Dallas, TX	Walk-on; didn't return
Zylan Cheatham	14	F	6'9"	220	RS Sophomore	Phoenix, AZ	Transferred to Arizona State
Matt Shrigley	20	F	6'6"	190	RS Senior	Encinitas, CA	Graduated
Niksha Federico	33	F	6'7"	200	Senior	San Diego, CA	Walk-on; graduated
Valentine Izundu	45	C	6'10"	240	RS Senior	Houston, TX	Graduated

=== Incoming transfers ===
Name	Number	Pos.	Height	Weight	Year	Hometown	Previous school
Patrick Fisher	13	G	6'4"	200	Sophomore	Carlsbad, CA	Transferred from Winthrop. Under NCAA transfer rules, Fisher will have to sit out for the 2017–18 season. Will have three years of remaining eligibility. Will join the team as a preferred walk-on.
Kameron Rooks	45	C	7'1"	265	RS Senior	San Marcos, CA	Transferred from California. Will be eligible to play immediately since Rooks graduated from California.

=== 2017 recruiting class ===
College recruiting information
Name	Hometown	School	Height	Weight	Commit date
Jordan Schakel #31 SF	Torrance, CA	Bishop Montgomery High School	6 ft 5 in (1.96 m)	180 lb (82 kg)	Jul 21, 2016
Jordan Schakel #31 SF	Recruit ratings: Scout: Rivals: 247Sports: ESPN:				
Adam Seiko #76 PG	Chatsworth, CA	Sierra Canyon High School	6 ft 2 in (1.88 m)	175 lb (79 kg)	Jun 16, 2016
Adam Seiko #76 PG	Recruit ratings: Scout: Rivals: 247Sports: ESPN:				
Matt Mitchell #81 SF	Corona, CA	Eleanor Roosevelt High School	6 ft 4 in (1.93 m)	180 lb (82 kg)	Aug 14, 2017
Matt Mitchell #81 SF	Recruit ratings: Scout: Rivals: 247Sports: ESPN:				
Overall recruit ranking:
Note: In many cases, Scout, Rivals, 247Sports, On3, and ESPN may conflict in their listings of height and weight.; In these cases, the average was taken. ESPN grades are on a 100-point scale.; Sources: "2017 San Diego St. Basketball Commitment List". Rivals.; "2017 San Diego St. Player Commits". ESPN.; "2017 Team Ranking". Rivals.

=== 2018 Recruiting class ===
College recruiting information (2018)
Name	Hometown	School	Height	Weight	Commit date
Jordan Campbell #73 SG	Victorville, CA	Scale Prep	6 ft 2 in (1.88 m)	160 lb (73 kg)	Aug 14, 2017
Jordan Campbell #73 SG	Recruit ratings: Scout: Rivals: 247Sports: ESPN:				
Nathan Mensah; PF	Accra, Ghana	Findlay Prep	6 ft 10 in (2.08 m)	210 lb (95 kg)	Oct 4, 2017
Nathan Mensah; PF	Recruit ratings: Scout: Rivals: 247Sports: ESPN:				
Joel Mensah; PF	Accra, Ghana	Junípero Serra High School	6 ft 10 in (2.08 m)	210 lb (95 kg)	Aug 12, 2017
Joel Mensah; PF	Recruit ratings: Scout: Rivals: 247Sports: ESPN:				
Overall recruit ranking:
Note: In many cases, Scout, Rivals, 247Sports, On3, and ESPN may conflict in their listings of height and weight.; In these cases, the average was taken. ESPN grades are on a 100-point scale.; Sources: "2018 San Diego St. Basketball Commitment List". Rivals.; "2018 San Diego St. Player Commits". ESPN.; "2018 Team Ranking". Rivals.

== Preseason ==
In a vote by conference media at the Mountain West media day, the Aztecs were picked to finish in second place in the Mountain West. Senior guard Trey Kell was named to the preseason All-Mountain West team.

== Roster ==
2017–18 San Diego State Aztecs men's basketball team
Players
Coaches

Pos.	#	Name	Height	Weight	Year	Previous school	Hometown
G	0	Devin Watson	6 ft 1 in (1.85 m)	172 lb (78 kg)	RS Jr	El Camino HS/San Francisco	Oceanside, California
G	2	Adam Seiko (redshirt)	6 ft 3 in (1.91 m)	195 lb (88 kg)	Fr	Sierra Canyon	Boston, Massachusetts
G	3	Trey Kell	6 ft 4 in (1.93 m)	216 lb (98 kg)	Sr	St. Augustine HS	San Diego, California
G	4	Michael Sohikish (W)	5 ft 9 in (1.75 m)	160 lb (73 kg)	Jr	University City HS	San Diego, California
F	5	Jalen McDaniels	6 ft 10 in (2.08 m)	195 lb (88 kg)	RS Fr	Federal Way HS	Federal Way, Washington
F	10	Max Montana	6 ft 9 in (2.06 m)	210 lb (95 kg)	RS Jr	Wilbraham & Monson Academy/Indiana	Calabasas, California
G	11	Matt Mitchell	6 ft 6 in (1.98 m)	230 lb (104 kg)	Fr	Roosevelt HS	Riverside, California
G	13	Patrick Fisher (W) (redshirt)	6 ft 4 in (1.93 m)	200 lb (91 kg)	So	Vermont Academy/Winthrop	Dallas, Texas
G	20	Jordan Schakel	6 ft 6 in (1.98 m)	195 lb (88 kg)	Fr	Bishop Montgomery HS	Torrance, California
F	21	Malik Pope	6 ft 10 in (2.08 m)	220 lb (100 kg)	Sr	Laguna Creek H.S.	Sacramento, California
C	24	Nolan Narain	6 ft 10 in (2.08 m)	230 lb (104 kg)	RS So	La Lumiere School	Hamilton, Ontario
G	31	Montaque Gill–Caesar	6 ft 6 in (1.98 m)	216 lb (98 kg)	RS Jr	Huntington Prep School/Missouri	Vaughan, Ontario
G	42	Jeremy Hemsley	6 ft 3 in (1.91 m)	200 lb (91 kg)	Jr	Damien HS	La Verne, California
C	45	Kameron Rooks	7 ft 1 in (2.16 m)	266 lb (121 kg)	RS Sr	Mission Hills HS/California	San Marcos, California

Head coach

- Brian Dutcher (Minnesota)

Assistant coach(es)

- Justin Hutson (Cal State Bakersfield)
- Dave Velasquez (San Diego State)
- Tim Shelton (San Diego State)

Legend

- (C) Team captain
- (S) Suspended
- (I) Ineligible
- (W) Walk-on
- Injured
- Current redshirt

Roster

== Schedule and results ==
Date time, TV	Rank^{#}	Opponent^{#}	Result	Record	Site (attendance) city, state
Exhibition
Nov 02, 2017*; 7:00 pm		UC San Diego	W 98–79	–	Viejas Arena (10,581); San Diego, CA
Non-conference regular season
Nov 10, 2017*; 7:00 pm		San Diego Christian	W 91–52	1–0	Viejas Arena (11,285); San Diego, CA
Nov 14, 2017*; 6:00 pm, P12N		at Arizona State	L 68–90	1–1	Wells Fargo Arena (6,640); Tempe, AZ
Nov 17, 2017*; 7:30 pm, FSSD		McNeese State	W 83–52	2–1	Viejas Arena (10,702); San Diego, CA
Nov 20, 2017*; 7:30 pm, FSSD		Eastern Illinois	W 94–63	3–1	Viejas Arena (9,821); San Diego, CA
Nov 23, 2017*; 10:00 pm, ESPNU		vs. Sacramento State; Wooden Legacy quarterfinals	W 89–52	4–1	Titan Gym (2,131); Fullerton, CA
Nov 24, 2017*; 4:00 pm, ESPN2		vs. Georgia; Wooden Legacy semifinals	W 75–68	5–1	Titan Gym (2,513); Fullerton, CA
Nov 26, 2017*; 9:00 pm, ESPN2		vs. Washington State; Wooden Legacy championship	L 86–93	5–2	Titan Gym (1,733); Fullerton, CA
Nov 30, 2017*; 7:00 pm, FSW		at San Diego; City Championship	W 66–57	6–2	Jenny Craig Pavilion (4,536); San Diego, CA
Dec 3, 2017*; 3:00 pm, Stadium		Bradley; MW–MVC Challenge	W 75–52	7–2	Viejas Arena (11,102); San Diego, CA
Dec 9, 2017*; 2:00 pm, CBSSN		California	L 62–63	7–3	Viejas Arena (11,381); San Diego, CA
Dec 21, 2017*; 7:00 pm, CBSSN		No. 12 Gonzaga	W 72–70	8–3	Viejas Arena (12,414); San Diego, CA
Mountain West regular season
Dec 27, 2017; 6:00 pm, ESPN3		at Wyoming	L 69–82	8–4 (0–1)	Arena-Auditorium (4,823); Laramie, WY
Dec 30, 2017; 7:00 pm, ESPN3		Utah State	W 79–59	9–4 (1–1)	Viejas Arena (12,414); San Diego, CA
Jan 2, 2018; 6:00 pm, CBSSN		at Colorado State	W 77–68	10–4 (2–1)	Moby Arena (3,020); Fort Collins, CO
Jan 9, 2018; 8:00 pm, CBSSN		San Jose State	W 85–49	11–4 (3–1)	Viejas Arena (11,761); San Diego, CA
Jan 13, 2018; 7:00 pm, ESPN2		at Boise State	L 80–83	11–5 (3–2)	Taco Bell Arena (10,874); Boise, ID
Jan 17, 2018; 8:00 pm, ESPNU		Fresno State	L 73–77	11–6 (3–3)	Viejas Arena (11,358); San Diego, CA
Jan 20, 2018; 4:00 pm, CBSSN		at New Mexico	L 75–79	11–7 (3–4)	The Pit (11,418); Albuquerque, NM
Jan 24, 2018; 8:00 pm, CBSSN		Colorado State	W 97–78	12–7 (4–4)	Viejas Arena (11,144); San Diego, CA
Jan 27, 2018; 7:00 pm, CBSSN		at UNLV	L 78–88	12–8 (4–5)	Thomas & Mack Center (11,137); Paradise, NV
Feb 3, 2018; 7:00 pm, ESPN3		Air Force	W 81–50	13–8 (5–5)	Viejas Arena (11,482); San Diego, CA
Feb 6, 2018; 8:00 pm, CBSSN		at Fresno State	L 61–79	13–9 (5–6)	Save Mart Center (6,128); Fresno, CA
Feb 10, 2018; 5:00 pm, ESPN2		at No. 23 Nevada	L 58–83	13–10 (5–7)	Lawlor Events Center (10,134); Reno, NV
Feb 14, 2018; 8:00 pm, CBSSN		Wyoming	W 87–77	14–10 (6–7)	Viejas Arena (10,494); San Diego, CA
Feb 17, 2018; 1:00 pm, CBSSN		UNLV	W 94–56	15–10 (7–7)	Viejas Arena (11,180); San Diego, CA
Feb 21, 2018; 6:30 pm, ESPN2		at Air Force	W 67–56	16–10 (8–7)	Clune Arena (1,868); Colorado Springs, CO
Feb 24, 2018; 7:00 pm, ESPN3		at San Jose State	W 71–59	17–10 (9–7)	Event Center Arena (2,642); San Jose, CA
Feb 27, 2018; 8:00 pm, CBSSN		Boise State	W 72–64	18–10 (10–7)	Viejas Arena (11,211); San Diego, CA
Mar 3, 2018; 7:00 pm, CBSSN		No. 21 Nevada	W 79–74	19–10 (11–7)	Viejas Arena (12,414); San Diego, CA
Mountain West tournament
Mar 8, 2018; 2:30 pm, CBSSN	(5)	vs. (4) Fresno State; Quarterfinals	W 64–52	20–10	Thomas & Mack Center (6,753); Paradise, NV
Mar 9, 2018; 6:00 pm, CBSSN	(5)	vs. (1) No. 22 Nevada; Semifinals	W 90–73	21–10	Thomas & Mack Center (8,456); Paradise, NV
Mar 10, 2018; 3:00 pm, CBS	(5)	vs. (3) New Mexico; Championship	W 82–75	22–10	Thomas & Mack Center (8,456); Paradise, NV
NCAA tournament
Mar 15, 2018*; 4:20 pm, TBS	(11 W)	vs. (6 W) No. 21 Houston; First Round	L 65–67	22–11	Intrust Bank Arena (14,019); Wichita, KS
*Non-conference game. ^{#}Rankings from AP Poll. (#) Tournament seedings in parentheses. W=West. All times are in Pacific Time.
