= 2017–18 Boise State Broncos men's basketball team =

American college basketball season

2017–18 Boise State Broncos men's basketball

NIT, First Round
- Conference: Mountain West Conference
- Record: 23–9 (13–5 MW)
- Head coach: Leon Rice (8th season)
- Assistant coaches: Phil Beckner; Mike Burns; Chris Acker
- Home arena: Taco Bell Arena

2017–18 Mountain West Conference men's basketball standings
	Conf.				Overall
Team	W		L	PCT	W		L	PCT
No. 24 Nevada	15	–	3	.833	29	–	8	.784
Boise State	13	–	5	.722	23	–	9	.719
New Mexico	12	–	6	.667	19	–	15	.559
Fresno State	11	–	7	.611	21	–	11	.656
San Diego State †	11	–	7	.611	22	–	11	.667
Wyoming	10	–	8	.556	20	–	13	.606
UNLV	8	–	10	.444	20	–	13	.606
Utah State	8	–	10	.444	17	–	17	.500
Air Force	6	–	12	.333	12	–	19	.387
Colorado State	4	–	14	.222	11	–	21	.344
San Jose State	1	–	17	.056	4	–	26	.133
† Conference tournament winner Rankings from AP poll

The 2017–18 Boise State Broncos men's basketball team represented Boise State University during the 2017–18 NCAA Division I men's basketball season. The Broncos, led by eighth-year head coach Leon Rice, played their home games at Taco Bell Arena as a member of the Mountain West Conference. They finished the season 23–9, 13–5 in Mountain West play to finish in second place. They lost in the quarterfinals of the Mountain West tournament to Utah State. They received an invitation to the National Invitation Tournament where they lost in the first round to Washington.

== Previous season ==
The Broncos finished the season 20–12, 12–6 in Mountain West play to finish in third place. They lost in the quarterfinals of the Mountain West tournament to San Diego State. They received an invitation to the National Invitation Tournament where they defeated Utah in the first round before losing in the second round to Illinois.

== Offseason ==
=== Departures ===
Name	Number	Pos.	Height	Weight	Year	Hometown	Reason for departure
Nicholas Duncan	13	F	6'8"	265	Senior	Sydney, Australia	Graduated
Cameron Oluyitan	23	F	6'6"	183	Sophomore	Houston, TX	Transferred to Southern Utah
Paris Austin	30	G	6'0"	175	Sophomore	Oakland, CA	Transferred to California
Matt Grooms	40	F	6'4"	215	RS Junior	Meridan, ID	Walk-on; didn't return
James Reid	55	G	6'3"	193	RS Senior	Bend, OR	Graduated

=== Incoming transfers ===
Name	Number	Pos.	Height	Weight	Year	Hometown	Notes
Lexus Williams	2	F	6'0"	167	Senior	Chicago, IL	Transferred from Valparaiso. Will be eligible to play immediately since Williams graduated from Valparaiso.
Casdon Jardine	22	F	6'7"	220	Sophomore	Twin Falls, ID	Junior college transferred from College of Idaho.
Christian Sengfelder	43	F	6'7"	238	Senior	Leverkusen, Germany	Transferred from Fordham. Will be eligible to play immediately since Sengfelder graduated from Fordham.

=== 2017 recruiting class ===
College recruiting
Name	Hometown	School	Height	Weight	Commit date
Cameron Christon; SG	Allen, TX	Allen High School	6 ft 5 in (1.96 m)	N/A	Apr 20, 2017
Cameron Christon; SG	Recruit ratings: Scout: Rivals: (NR)				
Overall recruit ranking: Scout: – Rivals: –
Note: In many cases, Scout, Rivals, 247Sports, On3, and ESPN may conflict in their listings of height and weight.; In these cases, the average was taken. ESPN grades are on a 100-point scale.; Sources: "2017 Team Ranking". Rivals.

=== 2018 recruiting class ===
College recruiting (2018)
Name	Hometown	School	Height	Weight	Commit date
Michael Frazier; PF	Salt Lake City, UT	East High School	6 ft 9 in (2.06 m)	245 lb (111 kg)	Sep 25, 2017
Michael Frazier; PF	Recruit ratings: Scout: Rivals: (NR)				
Jaycson BeReal; SF	Tulsa, OK	Booker T. Washington High School	6 ft 7 in (2.01 m)	200 lb (91 kg)	Jun 14, 2017
Jaycson BeReal; SF	Recruit ratings: Scout: Rivals: (NR)				
Riley Abercrombie; SF	Houston, TX	Clear Lake High School	6 ft 8 in (2.03 m)	205 lb (93 kg)	Sep 29, 2017
Riley Abercrombie; SF	Recruit ratings: Scout: Rivals: (NR)				
Overall recruit ranking: Scout: – Rivals: –
Note: In many cases, Scout, Rivals, 247Sports, On3, and ESPN may conflict in their listings of height and weight.; In these cases, the average was taken. ESPN grades are on a 100-point scale.; Sources: "2018 Team Ranking". Rivals.

== Preseason ==
In a vote by conference media at the Mountain West media day, the Broncos were picked to finish in third place in the Mountain West. Senior guard Chandler Hutchison was named the preseason All-Mountain West Player of the Year.

== Roster ==
2017–18 Boise State Broncos men's basketball team
Players
Coaches

Pos.	#	Name	Height	Weight	Year	Previous school	Hometown
G	0	Marcus Dickinson	6 ft 2 in (1.88 m)	177 lb (80 kg)	So	Norman North HS	Norman, OK
G	1	Cameron Christon	6 ft 6 in (1.98 m)	188 lb (85 kg)	Fr	Allen HS	Allen, TX
G	2	Lexus Williams	6 ft 0 in (1.83 m)	167 lb (76 kg)	RS Sr	Marist HS; Valparaiso	Chicago, IL
G	3	Justinian Jessup	6 ft 6 in (1.98 m)	200 lb (91 kg)	So	Longmont HS	Longmont, CO
G	4	Matt Serven (W)	6 ft 4 in (1.93 m)	166 lb (75 kg)	Fr	Edison HS	Huntington Beach, CA
G	5	Malek Harwell	6 ft 5 in (1.96 m)	188 lb (85 kg)	RS So	Century HS	Pocatello, ID
F	10	Robin Jorch	6 ft 11 in (2.11 m)	245 lb (111 kg)	Jr	International Berlin Basketball Academy	Berlin, Germany
F	11	Zach Haney	6 ft 11 in (2.11 m)	239 lb (108 kg)	RS Jr	Atascocita HS	Humble, TX
F	15	Chandler Hutchison	6 ft 7 in (2.01 m)	197 lb (89 kg)	Sr	Mission Viejo HS	Mission Viejo, CA
G	21	Derrick Alston Jr. (W)	6 ft 8 in (2.03 m)	153 lb (69 kg)	RS Fr	Strake Jesuit HS	Houston, TX
G/F	22	Casdon Jardine	6 ft 7 in (2.01 m)	218 lb (99 kg)	So	Twin Falls HS; CSI	Twin Falls, ID
C	33	David Wacker	6 ft 10 in (2.08 m)	236 lb (107 kg)	RS Jr	Judson HS	Converse, TX
G	34	Alex Hobbs	6 ft 4 in (1.93 m)	191 lb (87 kg)	So	La Porte HS	La Porte, TX
F	43	Christian Sengfelder	6 ft 9 in (2.06 m)	246 lb (112 kg)	Sr	Fordham	Leverkusen, Germany

Head coach

- Leon Rice (Washington State)

Assistant coach(es)

- Phil Beckner (Kansas Wesleyan)
- Mike Burns (Central Washington)
- Chris Acker (Chaminade)

Legend

- (C) Team captain
- (S) Suspended
- (I) Ineligible
- (W) Walk-on
- Injured
- Current redshirt

Roster

== Schedule and results ==
Date time, TV	Rank^{#}	Opponent^{#}	Result	Record	Site (attendance) city, state
Exhibition
Nov 2, 2017*; 7:00 pm		College of Idaho	W 74–69		Taco Bell Arena (3,516); Boise, ID
Non-conference regular season
Nov 10, 2017*; 8:00 pm		Eastern Oregon	W 104–65	1–0	Taco Bell Arena (4,095); Boise, ID
Nov 12, 2017*; 2:00 pm		Southern Utah	W 90–69	2–0	Taco Bell Arena (3,052); Boise, ID
Nov 16, 2017*; 12:00 pm, ESPNU		vs. UTEP; Puerto Rico Tip-Off quarterfinals	W 58–56	3–0	HTC Center (701); Conway, SC
Nov 17, 2017*; 11:00 am, ESPN2		vs. Illinois State; Puerto Rico Tip-Off semifinals	W 82–64	4–0	HTC Center (875); Conway, SC
Nov 19, 2017*; 5:30 pm, ESPN2		vs. Iowa State; Puerto Rico Tip-Off championship game	L 64–75	4–1	HTC Center (2,119); Conway, SC
Nov 25, 2017*; 7:00 pm		Loyola Marymount	W 68–48	5–1	Taco Bell Arena (5,750); Boise, ID
Nov 28, 2017*; 7:00 pm		Loyola–Chicago; MW–MVC Challenge	W 87–53	6–1	Taco Bell Arena (3,738); Boise, ID
Dec 1, 2017*; 7:30 pm, P12N		at Oregon	W 73–70	7–1	Matthew Knight Arena (7,688); Eugene, OR
Dec 3, 2017*; 2:00 pm		Portland	W 77–54	8–1	Taco Bell Arena (4,518); Boise, ID
Dec 9, 2017*; 2:00 pm		Sacramento State	W 77–54	9–1	Taco Bell Arena (4,648); Boise, ID
Dec 13, 2017*; 7:00 pm		Grand Canyon	W 85–80 ^{2OT}	10–1	Taco Bell Arena (4,628); Boise, ID
Dec 18, 2017*; 7:00 pm, ESPNU		at SMU	L 63–86	10–2	Moody Coliseum (6,551); Dallas, TX
Mountain West regular season
Dec 27, 2017; 7:30 pm, CBSSN		Colorado State	W 93–71	11–2 (1–0)	Taco Bell Arena (7,538); Boise, ID
Dec 30, 2017; 9:00 pm, ATTSNRM		at UNLV	W 83–74	12–2 (2–0)	Thomas & Mack Center (11,892); Paradise, NV
Jan 3, 2018; 7:00 pm, ESPN3		New Mexico	W 90–62	13–2 (3–0)	Taco Bell Arena (7,557); Boise, ID
Jan 6, 2018; 6:00 pm, ATTSNRM		at Wyoming	L 78–79 ^{OT}	13–3 (3–1)	Arena-Auditorium (5,301); Laramie, WY
Jan 9, 2018; 9:00 pm, ESPNU		at Fresno State	W 70–64	14–3 (4–1)	Save Mart Center (4,980); Fresno, CA
Jan 13, 2018; 8:00 pm, ESPN2		San Diego State	W 83–80	15–3 (5–1)	Taco Bell Arena (10,874); Boise, ID
Jan 17, 2018; 7:00 pm, Stadium		Utah State	W 71–67	16–3 (6–1)	Taco Bell Arena (7,002); Boise, ID
Jan 20, 2018; 8:00 pm, ESPN2		at Nevada	L 68–74	16–4 (6–2)	Lawlor Events Center (11,164); Reno, NV
Jan 24, 2018; 8:00 pm, ATTSNRM		San Jose State	W 94–71	17–4 (7–2)	Taco Bell Arena (7,378); Boise, ID
Jan 27, 2018; 8:00 pm, ESPNU		at Air Force	W 70–64	18–4 (8–2)	Clune Arena (2,436); Colorado Springs, CO
Feb 3, 2018; 6:00 pm, CBSSN		UNLV	W 93–91 ^{OT}	19–4 (9–2)	Taco Bell Arena (10,737); Boise, ID
Feb 6, 2018; 8:00 pm, ESPNU		at New Mexico	W 73–71	20–4 (10–2)	The Pit (11,357); Albuquerque, NM
Feb 10, 2018; 7:00 pm, ATTSNRM		at Utah State	L 65–71	20–5 (10–3)	Smith Spectrum (8,421); Logan, UT
Feb 14, 2018; 9:00 pm, ESPNU		No. 24 Nevada	L 72–77	20–6 (10–4)	Taco Bell Arena (8,611); Boise, ID
Feb 17, 2018; 12:00 pm, ATTSNRM		Air Force	W 76–52	21–6 (11–4)	Taco Bell Arena (7,530); Boise, ID
Feb 21, 2018; 7:00 pm, ESPN3		at Colorado State	W 87–54	22–6 (12–4)	Moby Arena (2,850); Fort Collins, CO
Feb 27, 2018; 9:00 pm, CBSSN		at San Diego State	L 64–72	22–7 (12–5)	Viejas Arena (11,211); San Diego, CA
Mar 3, 2018; 5:00 pm, ATTSNRM		Wyoming	W 95–87	23–7 (13–5)	Taco Bell Arena (10,303); Boise, ID
Mountain West tournament
Mar 8, 2018; 7:00 pm, CBSSN	(2)	vs. (7) Utah State; Quarterfinals	L 75–78	23–8	Thomas & Mack Center (7,138); Paradise, NV
NIT
Mar 14, 2018*; 8:00 pm, ESPN3	(4)	at (5) Washington; First Round – Saint Mary's Bracket	L 74–77	23–9	Alaska Airlines Arena (3,119); Seattle, WA
*Non-conference game. ^{#}Rankings from AP Poll. (#) Tournament seedings in parentheses. All times are in Mountain Time Source.
