= 2018 Mountain West Conference men's basketball tournament =

- Classification: Division I
- Season: 2017–18
- Teams: 11
- Site: Thomas & Mack Center; Paradise, Nevada
- Champions: San Diego State (5th title)
- Winning coach: Brian Dutcher (1st title)
- MVP: Trey Kell (San Diego State)
- Attendance: 35,565
- Television: Stadium, CBSSN, CBS

2017–18 Mountain West Conference men's basketball standings
	Conf.				Overall
Team	W		L	PCT	W		L	PCT
No. 24 Nevada	15	–	3	.833	29	–	8	.784
Boise State	13	–	5	.722	23	–	9	.719
New Mexico	12	–	6	.667	19	–	15	.559
Fresno State	11	–	7	.611	21	–	11	.656
San Diego State †	11	–	7	.611	22	–	11	.667
Wyoming	10	–	8	.556	20	–	13	.606
UNLV	8	–	10	.444	20	–	13	.606
Utah State	8	–	10	.444	17	–	17	.500
Air Force	6	–	12	.333	12	–	19	.387
Colorado State	4	–	14	.222	11	–	21	.344
San Jose State	1	–	17	.056	4	–	26	.133
† Conference tournament winner Rankings from AP poll

The 2018 Mountain West Conference men's basketball tournament was the postseason men's basketball tournament for the Mountain West Conference. It was held from March 7–10, 2018 at the Thomas & Mack Center on the campus of University of Nevada, Las Vegas, in Las Vegas, Nevada. San Diego State defeated New Mexico in the championship game to win the tournament receive the conference's automatic bid to the NCAA tournament.

== Seeds ==
All 11 MW schools were eligible to participate in the tournament. Teams were seeded by conference record, with a ties broken by record between the tied teams followed by record against the regular-season champion, if necessary. As a result, the top five teams receive a bye to the quarterfinals of the tournament. Tiebreaking procedures will remain unchanged from the 2017 tournament:

- Record between the tied teams
- Record against the highest-seeded team not involved in the tie, going down through the seedings as necessary
- Higher RPI:
- Head-to-head

Seed	School	Conf	Tiebreaker
1	Nevada	15–3	
2	Boise State	13–5	
3	New Mexico	12–6	
4	Fresno State	11–7	2–0 vs San Diego State
5	San Diego State	11–7	0–2 vs Fresno State
6	Wyoming	10–8	
7	Utah State	8–10	2–0 vs UNLV
8	UNLV	8–10	0–2 vs Utah State
9	Air Force	6–12	
10	Colorado State	4–14	
11	San Jose State	1–17	

== Schedule ==
Game	Time	Matchup	Score	Television	Attendance
First round – Wednesday, March 7
1	11:00 am	No. 8 UNLV vs. No. 9 Air Force	97–90 ^{OT}	Stadium	4,994
2	1:30 pm	No. 7 Utah State vs. No. 10 Colorado State	76–65	Stadium	4,994
3	4:00 pm	No. 6 Wyoming vs. No. 11 San Jose State	74–61	Stadium	4,994
Quarterfinals – Thursday, March 8
4	Noon	No. 1 Nevada vs. No. 8 UNLV	79–74	CBSSN	6,753
5	2:30 pm	No. 4 Fresno State vs. No. 5 San Diego State	52–64	CBSSN	6,753
6	6:00 pm	No. 2 Boise State vs. No. 7 Utah State	75–78	CBSSN	7,138
7	8:30 pm	No. 3 New Mexico vs. No. 6 Wyoming	85–75	CBSSN	7,138
Semifinals – Friday, March 9
8	6:00 pm	No. 1 Nevada vs. No. 5 San Diego State	73–90	CBSSN	8,224
9	8:30 pm	No. 3 New Mexico vs. No. 7 Utah State	83–68	CBSSN	8,224
Championship – Saturday, March 10
10	3:00 pm	No. 3 New Mexico vs. No. 5 San Diego State	75–82	CBS	8,456
Game times in PT. Rankings denote tournament seeding.

== Bracket ==
First round Wednesday, March 7
8	UNLV	97*
9	Air Force	90
7	Utah State	76
10	Colorado State	65
6	Wyoming	74
11	San Jose State	61

Quarterfinals; Thursday, March 8
1	Nevada	79
8	UNLV	74
4	Fresno State	52
5	San Diego State	64
2	Boise State	75
7	Utah State	78
3	New Mexico	85
6	Wyoming	75

Semifinals; Friday, March 9
1	Nevada	73
5	San Diego State	90
7	Utah State	68
3	New Mexico	83

Championship; Saturday, March 10
5	San Diego State	82
3	New Mexico	75

* denotes overtime period

== See also ==
- 2018 Mountain West Conference women's basketball tournament
