= Kareem Richardson =

American basketball coach (born 1974)

- Richardson in 2026

Xavier Musketeers
- Title: Assistant coach
- Conference: Big East Conference

Personal information
- Born: August 8, 1974 (age 52) Tacoma, Washington, U.S.

Career information
- High school: Rantoul Township (Rantoul, Illinois)
- College: East Carolina (1993-1995); Evansville (1995-1997)
- Position: Point guard
- Coaching career: 1997–present

Career history

Coaching
- 1997–1999: Indianapolis (assistant)
- 1999–2002: Indiana State (assistant)
- 2002–2003: Wright State (assistant)
- 2003–2007: Evansville (assistant)
- 2007–2008: Kansas City (assistant)
- 2008–2011: Drake (assistant)
- 2011–2012: Xavier (assistant)
- 2012–2013: Louisville (assistant)
- 2013–2019: Kansas City
- 2019–2021: Indiana State (assistant)
- 2021–2022: Clemson (assistant)
- 2022–2025: NC State (assistant)
- 2025–present: Xavier (assistant)

Career highlights
- As assistant coach: NCAA champion (2013); MVC tournament champion (2001)

Kareem Andre Richardson (born August 8, 1974) is an American college basketball coach who is currently in his second stint as an assistant coach at Xavier University. He was formerly an assistant coach at Indianapolis, Indiana State, Wright State, Evansville, Kansas City, Drake, Louisville, Clemson, and NC State, as well as the head coach at Kansas City.

== Career ==
Richardson played college basketball at East Carolina University and the University of Evansville, graduating as team captain from the latter in 1997.

Following his playing career, he worked as an assistant coach for several different schools before accepting the head coaching position at the University of Missouri-Kansas City. Richardson was fired as head coach of UMKC on March 17, 2019, after compiling a 75–118 record in six seasons.

He was hired as an assistant coach at Clemson University on April 22, 2021. In 2022 he joined Kevin Keatts's staff at North Carolina State University.

On April 29, 2025, Richardson was hired as an assistant coach at Xavier University, joining new head coach Richard Pitino's inaugural staff.

== Head coaching record ==
Record table
Season	Team	Overall	Conference	Standing	Postseason
UMKC Kangaroos (Western Athletic Conference) (2013–2019)
2013–14	UMKC	10–20	7–9	T–5th	
2014–15	UMKC	14–19	8–6	T–2nd	
2015–16	UMKC	12–19	4–10	T–6th	
2016–17	UMKC	18–17	8–6	4th	CBI Quarterfinals
2017–18	UMKC	10–22	5–9	T–6th	
2018–19	UMKC	11–21	6–10	6th	
UMKC:		75–118 (.389)	38–50 (.432)		
Total:		75–118 (.389)			
National champion Postseason invitational champion Conference regular season champion Conference regular season and conference tournament champion Division regular season champion Division regular season and conference tournament champion Conference tournament champion
