= 2016–17 New Mexico State Aggies men's basketball team =

American college basketball season

2016–17 New Mexico State Aggies men's basketball

WAC tournament champions

NCAA tournament, First Round
- Conference: Western Athletic Conference
- Record: 28–6 (11–3 WAC)
- Head coach: Paul Weir (1st season)
- Assistant coaches: Jesse Bopp; Aerick Sanders; Marc Hsu
- Home arena: Pan American Center

2016–17 WAC men's basketball standings
	Conf.				Overall
Team	W		L	PCT	W		L	PCT
Cal State Bakersfield	12	–	2	.857	25	–	10	.714
New Mexico State †	11	–	3	.786	28	–	6	.824
Grand Canyon *	11	–	3	.786	22	–	9	.710
UMKC	8	–	6	.571	18	–	17	.514
Utah Valley	6	–	8	.429	17	–	17	.500
Seattle	5	–	9	.357	13	–	17	.433
Texas–Rio Grande Valley	2	–	12	.143	10	–	22	.313
Chicago State	1	–	13	.071	6	–	26	.188
† 2017 WAC tournament winner * Ineligible for postseason during transition to NCAA Division I.

The 2016–17 New Mexico State Aggies men's basketball team represented New Mexico State University during the 2016–17 NCAA Division I men's basketball season. The Aggies, led by first-year head coach Paul Weir, played their home games at the Pan American Center in Las Cruces, New Mexico as members of the Western Athletic Conference. They finished the season 28–6, 11–3 in WAC play to finish in a tie for second place. They defeated Chicago State, UMKC, and Cal State Bakersfield to win the WAC tournament. As a result, they received the conference's automatic bid to the NCAA tournament where they lost in the first round to Baylor.

On April 11, 2017, head coach Paul Weir resigned to become the head coach at New Mexico. On April 17, the school hired Chris Jans as head coach.

== Previous season ==
The Aggies finished the 2015–16 season 23–11, 13–1 in WAC play to win the WAC regular season championship. They defeated UMKC to advance to the championship game of the WAC tournament where they lost to Cal State Bakersfield. As a regular season conference champion who failed to win their conference tournament, they received an automatic bid to the National Invitation Tournament where they lost in the first round to Saint Mary's.

On April 16, 2016, head coach Marvin Menzies left the school to accept the head coaching position at UNLV. On April 26, the school hired Paul Weir, an assistant coach under Menzies, as head coach.

== Departures ==
Name	Number	Pos.	Height	Weight	Year	Hometown	Notes
Harold Givens	1	F	6'7"	200	RS Freshman	Norcross, GA	Transferred to Pearl River CC
Rashawn Browne	10	G	6'1"	170	RS Freshman	Toronto, ON	Transferred to California (PA)
Jose Campo	14	F	6'11"	206	RS Freshman	Riohacha, Colombia	Left the team for personal reasons
Rene Esparza	15	G	6'3"	175	Junior	Ciudad Juárez, Mexico	Left the team for personal reasons
Pascal Siakam	43	F	6'9"	230	Sophomore	Donala, Cameroon	Declare for 2016 NBA draft

=== Incoming transfers ===
Name	Number	Pos.	Height	Weight	Year	Hometown	Previous School
Chance Ellis	3	G	6'3"	223	Sophomore	New York, NY	Junior college transferred from New Mexico Military Institute
Jemerrio Jones	10	F	6'6"	190	Junior	Memphis, TN	Junior college transferred from Hill College
A. J. Harris	12	G	5'9"	157	Sophomore	Dayton, OH	Transferred from Ohio State. Under NCAA transfer rules, Harris will have to sit out for the 2016–17 season. Will have three years of remaining eligibility.
Marlon Jones	23	F	6'7"	218	Junior	Chicago, IL	Junior college transferred from South Plains College

=== 2016 Recruiting Class ===
College recruiting information
Name	Hometown	School	Height	Weight	Commit date
Johnny McCants; F	Las Cruces, NM	Oñate High School	6 ft 7 in (2.01 m)	205 lb (93 kg)	Jun 7, 2016
Johnny McCants; F	Recruit ratings: Rivals:				
Chance Ellis; G	New York, NY	New Mexico Military Institute	6 ft 3 in (1.91 m)	223 lb (101 kg)	
Chance Ellis; G	Recruit ratings: No ratings found				
A.J. Harris; G	Dayton, OH	Ohio State	5 ft 9 in (1.75 m)	157 lb (71 kg)	
A.J. Harris; G	Recruit ratings: Scout: Rivals: 247Sports: (84)				
Jemerrio Jones; F	Memphis, TN	Hill JC	6 ft 6 in (1.98 m)	190 lb (86 kg)	
Jemerrio Jones; F	Recruit ratings: Rivals: (62)				
Marlon Jones; F	Chicago, IL	South Plains JC	6 ft 7 in (2.01 m)	218 lb (99 kg)	
Marlon Jones; F	Recruit ratings: Scout: Rivals: 247Sports: (73)				
Overall recruit ranking:
Note: In many cases, Scout, Rivals, 247Sports, On3, and ESPN may conflict in their listings of height and weight.; In these cases, the average was taken. ESPN grades are on a 100-point scale.; Sources: "2016 New Mexico State Basketball Commits". ESPN.

== Roster ==
2016–17 New Mexico State Aggies men's basketball team
Players
Coaches

Pos.	#	Name	Height	Weight	Year	Previous school	Hometown
G	0	Travon Landry (injured)	6 ft 1 in (1.85 m)	184 lb (83 kg)	RS Jr	Huntington Prep	San Antonio, TX
G	1	Jermaine Haley	6 ft 7 in (2.01 m)	185 lb (84 kg)	RS Fr	Sunrise Christian Academy	Burnaby, BC
G	2	Braxton Huggins	6 ft 3 in (1.91 m)	184 lb (83 kg)	Jr	Mira Monte HS	Bakersfield, CA
G	3	Chance Ellis	6 ft 3 in (1.91 m)	217 lb (98 kg)	So	St. Andrew's HS; New Mexico Military Institute	Queens, NY
G	4	Ian Baker	6 ft 0 in (1.83 m)	190 lb (86 kg)	Sr	Arlington Country Day HS	Washington, D.C.
G	5	Matt Taylor	6 ft 4 in (1.93 m)	173 lb (78 kg)	Jr	Future College Prep	Toronto, ON
F	10	Jemerrio Jones	6 ft 5 in (1.96 m)	174 lb (79 kg)	RS Jr	Melrose HS; Hill College	Memphis, TN
F	11	Johnathon Wilkins	6 ft 10 in (2.08 m)	218 lb (99 kg)	RS Jr	La Lumiere HS	Lille, France
G	12	A. J. Harris (I)	5 ft 9 in (1.75 m)	163 lb (74 kg)	So	Dunbar HS; Ohio State	Dayton, OH
G	13	Sidy Ndir	6 ft 2 in (1.88 m)	185 lb (84 kg)	RS So	West Oaks Academy	Cosne-Cours-sur-Loire, France
G	14	Joe Garza (W)	6 ft 0 in (1.83 m)	175 lb (79 kg)	Jr	Las Cruces HS	Las Cruces, NM
C	21	Tanveer Bhullar	7 ft 2 in (2.18 m)	285 lb (129 kg)	RS Jr	Father Henry Carr Secondary	Toronto, ON
F	22	Eli Chuha	6 ft 8 in (2.03 m)	228 lb (103 kg)	RS So	Redlands East Valley HS	Redlands, CA
F	23	Marlon Jones	6 ft 9 in (2.06 m)	222 lb (101 kg)	Jr	Orr Academy HS; South Plains College	Chicago, IL
F	33	Johnny McCants (redshirt)	6 ft 7 in (2.01 m)	198 lb (90 kg)	Fr	Oñate HS	Las Cruces, NM
C	34	Bollo Gnahore (injured)	6 ft 10 in (2.08 m)	258 lb (117 kg)	RS Fr	New Hope Christian Academy	Abidjan, Ivory Coast
G	35	Jalyn Pennie	6 ft 5 in (1.96 m)	185 lb (84 kg)	Jr	Christian Faith Center Academy	Toronto, ON

Head coach

- Paul Weir (York)

Assistant coach(es)

- Jesse Bopp (Plymouth State)
- Aerick Sanders (San Diego State)
- Marc Hsu (Cabrini)

Legend

- (C) Team captain
- (S) Suspended
- (I) Ineligible
- (W) Walk-on
- Injured
- Current redshirt

Roster

== Schedule and results ==
Date time, TV	Rank^{#}	Opponent^{#}	Result	Record	High points	High rebounds	High assists	Site (attendance) city, state
Regular season
11/11/2016*; 7:30 pm		Arizona Christian	W 100–52	1–0	14 – N'Dir	12 – Chuha	4 – 2 Tied	Pan American Center (5,803); Las Cruces, NM
11/13/2016*; 2:00 pm, RTRM		at Colorado State	L 61–64	1–1	16 – Baker	9 – J. Jones	3 – N'Dir	Moby Arena (2,264); Fort Collins, CO
11/16/2016*; 7:00 pm		Samford; San Diego Classic	W 58–48	2–1	16 – Chuha	13 – Chuha	4 – J. Jones	Pan American Center (3,373); Las Cruces, NM
11/18/2016*; 7:00 pm, ESPN3		at New Mexico; Rio Grande Rivalry	L 59–72	2–2	25 – Baker	10 – Bhullar	3 – N'Dir	The Pit (13,892); Albuquerque, NM
11/20/2016*; 3:00 pm		Bethune-Cookman; San Diego Classic	W 89–73	3–2	28 – Huggins	7 – Bhullar	4 – N'Dir	Pan American Center (4,323); Las Cruces, NM
11/22/2016*; 7:00 pm		Nicholls State; San Diego Classic	W 86–74	4–2	24 – J. Jones	9 – J. Jones	4 – 3 Tied	Pan American Center (3,301); Las Cruces, NM
11/26/2016*; 3:00 pm		at San Diego; San Diego Classic	W 56–51	5–2	15 – Baker	9 – 2 Tied	2 – Huggins	Jenny Craig Pavilion (1,008); San Diego, CA
11/30/2016*; 7:30 pm		Air Force	W 78–70	6–2	15 – 2 Tied	7 – J. Jones	7 – 2 Tied	Pan American Center (4,382); Las Cruces, NM
12/03/2016*; 7:00 pm		Long Beach State	W 93–85	7–2	26 – Huggins	13 – J. Jones	3 – 2 Tied	Pan American Center (3,679); Las Cruces, NM
12/10/2016*; 8:00 pm, ESPN3		New Mexico; Rio Grande Rivalry	W 84–71	8–2	26 – Baker	14 – Chuha	3 – 2 Tied	Pan American Center (6,298); Las Cruces, NM
12/13/2016*; 7:00 pm		at UTEP; Battle of I-10	W 79–68	9–2	20 – Baker	13 – J. Jones	3 – 2 Tied	Don Haskins Center (6,815); El Paso, TX
12/17/2016*; 6:00 pm, P12N		at Arizona State	W 81–70	10–2	24 – Huggins	11 – Chuha	7 – Baker	Wells Fargo Arena (5,426); Tempe, AZ
12/19/2016*; 7:00 pm		UC Irvine	W 85–79 ^{OT}	11–2	24 – Huggins	18 – J. Jones	8 – Baker	Pan American Center (3,794); Las Cruces, NM
12/27/2016*; 7:00 pm		Eastern New Mexico	W 84–50	12–2	18 – Baker	9 – 2 Tied	5 – J. Jones	Pan American Center (3,912); Las Cruces, NM
12/30/2016*; 7:00 pm, ESPN3		UTEP; Battle of I-10	W 79–70	13–2	24 – Baker	11 – J. Jones	4 – 2 Tied	Pan American Center (5,639); Las Cruces, NM
01/05/2017; 5:00 pm, ASN		at UMKC	W 77–64	14–2 (1–0)	31 – Huggins	10 – Chuha	10 – Baker	Municipal Auditorium (1,024); Kansas City, MO
01/07/2017; 1:05 pm		at Chicago State	W 78–62	15–2 (2–0)	27 – Huggins	10 – Chuha	6 – Baker	Jones Convention Center (1,636); Chicago, IL
01/12/2017; 7:00 pm, ESPN3		Grand Canyon	W 81–69	16–2 (3–0)	19 – J. Jones	13 – Chuha	5 – Baker	Pan American Center (4,800); Las Cruces, NM
01/14/2017; 7:00 pm		Cal State Bakersfield	W 63–58	17–2 (4–0)	13 – Baker	16 – J. Jones	4 – Baker	Pan American Center (4,295); Las Cruces, NM
01/21/2017; 7:00 pm		UMKC	W 94–71	18–2 (5–0)	20 – Baker	14 – J. Jones	6 – Taylor	Pan American Center (9,893); Las Cruces, NM
01/26/2017; 8:00 pm		at Seattle	W 71–56	19–2 (6–0)	19 – Baker	11 – Baker	5 – J. Jones	KeyArena (1,267); Seattle, WA
01/28/2017; 7:00 pm		at Utah Valley	W 74–69	20–2 (7–0)	24 – Baker	13 – J. Jones	6 – Haley	UCCU Center (6,246); Orem, UT
01/30/2017*; 7:00 pm		vs. Northern New Mexico	W 98–75	21–2	27 – Baker	11 – Chuha	5 – Haley	Santa Ana Star Center (2,033); Rio Rancho, NM
02/04/2017; 7:00 pm		Chicago State	W 86–51	22–2 (8–0)	15 – Taylor	11 – Chuha	8 – Haley	Pan American Center (5,445); Las Cruces, NM
02/09/2017; 8:00 pm		at Cal State Bakersfield	L 53–72	22–3 (8–1)	19 – Baker	16 – J. Jones	3 – Baker	Icardo Center (3,497); Bakersfield, CA
02/11/2017; 7:00 pm, ESPN3		at Grand Canyon	L 71–83	22–4 (8–2)	19 – Baker	11 – Chuha	6 – Baker	GCU Arena (7,479); Phoenix, AZ
02/18/2017; 6:00 pm		at Texas–Rio Grande Valley	W 107–101	23–4 (9–2)	36 – Baker	9 – J. Jones	7 – Baker	UTRGV Fieldhouse (2,234); Edinburg, TX
02/23/2017; 7:00 pm		Utah Valley	L 72–84	23–5 (9–3)	21 – Baker	10 – Chuha	3 – Huggins	Pan American Center (4,151); Las Cruces, NM
02/25/2017; 7:00 pm		Seattle	W 86–53	24–5 (10–3)	17 – Chuha	11 – Chuha	9 – Baker	Pan American Center (4,744); Las Cruces, NM
03/04/2017; 7:00 pm		Texas–Rio Grande Valley	W 107–81	25–5 (11–3)	28 – Chuha	10 – J. Jones	7 – Baker	Pan American Center (5,233); Las Cruces, NM
WAC tournament
03/09/2017; 5:30 pm	(2)	vs. (7) Chicago State; Quarterfinals	W 67–53	26–5	15 – Baker	11 – Chuha	5 – Baker	Orleans Arena (1,854); Paradise, NV
03/10/2017; 9:30 pm, ESPN3	(2)	vs. (3) UMKC; Semifinals	W 78–60	27–5	18 – 2 Tied	13 – J. Jones	4 – 2 Tied	Orleans Arena (2,190); Paradise, NV
03/11/2017; 9:00 pm, ESPNU	(2)	vs. (1) Cal State Bakersfield; Championship	W 70–60	28–5	16 – Chuha	11 – Chuha	6 – Baker	Orleans Arena (2,444); Paradise, NV
NCAA tournament
03/17/17*; 11:40 am, truTV	(14 E)	vs. (3 E) No. 9 Baylor; First Round	L 73–91	28–6	19 – 2 Tied	6 – 2 Tied	7 – J. Jones	BOK Center (13,571); Tulsa, OK
*Non-conference game. ^{#}Rankings from AP Poll. (#) Tournament seedings in parentheses. E=East Region. All times are in Mountain Time Source.
