= 2016–17 Wyoming Cowboys basketball team =

American college basketball season

2016–17 Wyoming Cowboys basketball

CBI champion
- Conference: Mountain West Conference
- Record: 23–15 (8–10 MW)
- Head coach: Allen Edwards (1st season)
- Assistant coaches: Jeremy Shyatt; Tony Pujol; Jermaine Kimbrough
- Home arena: Arena-Auditorium

2016–17 Mountain West Conference men's basketball standings
	Conf.				Overall
Team	W		L	PCT	W		L	PCT
Nevada †	14	–	4	.778	28	–	7	.800
Colorado State	13	–	5	.722	24	–	12	.667
Boise State	12	–	6	.667	20	–	12	.625
Fresno State	11	–	7	.611	20	–	13	.606
New Mexico	10	–	8	.556	17	–	14	.548
San Diego State	9	–	9	.500	19	–	14	.576
Wyoming	8	–	10	.444	23	–	15	.605
San Jose State	7	–	11	.389	14	–	16	.467
Utah State	7	–	11	.389	14	–	17	.452
Air Force	4	–	14	.222	12	–	21	.364
UNLV	4	–	14	.222	11	–	21	.344
† Conference tournament winner

The 2016–17 Wyoming Cowboys basketball team represented the University of Wyoming during the 2016–17 NCAA Division I men's basketball season. Their head coach was Allen Edwards in his first year. They played their home games at the Arena-Auditorium in Laramie, Wyoming as a member of the Mountain West Conference. They finished the season 23–15, 8–10 in Mountain West play to finish in seventh place. They lost in the first round of the Mountain West tournament to Air Force. They were invited to the College Basketball Invitational, where they defeated Eastern Washington, UMKC and Utah Valley to advance to the best-of-three finals series against Coastal Carolina. They defeated Coastal Carolina 2 games to 1 to become CBI champions. They become the second consecutive Mountain West team to win the CBI after Nevada in 2016.

== Previous season ==
The Cowboys finished the season 14–18, 7–11 in Mountain West play to finish in a tie for eighth place. They lost in the first round of the Mountain West tournament to Utah State. On March 21, head coach Larry Shyatt resigned.

== Departures ==
Name	Number	Pos.	Height	Weight	Year	Hometown	Reason for departure
Austin Conway	2	G	5'8"	175	RS freshman	Aurora, CO	Would play football at Wyoming
Josh Adams	14	G	6'2"	190	Senior	Parker, CO	Graduated
Trey Washington III	55	G	5'11"	185	RS sophomore	Dallas, TX	Transferred to Texas A&M–Commerce

== Incoming transfers ==
Name	Number	Pos.	Height	Weight	Year	Hometown	Previous school
Nyaires Redding	0	G	6'2"	166	Junior	Solon, OH	Transferred from Washington State. Under NCAA transfer rules, Redding sat out the 2016–17 season. Had two years of eligibility remaining. Was a walk-on at Wyoming.
Brodricks Jones	15	F	6'10"	220	Sophomore	Los Angeles, CA	Transferred from UTEP. Under NCAA transfer rules, Jones sat out the 2016–17 season. Had three years of eligibility remaining.
Louis Adams	24	G	6'4"	185	Junior	Chicago, IL	Junior college transfer from Odessa College

== Incoming recruits ==
College recruiting
Name	Hometown	School	Height	Weight	Commit date
Austin Mueller #72 PF	Highlands Ranch, CO	ThunderRidge HS	6 ft 6 in (1.98 m)	210 lb (95 kg)	Jun 17, 2015
Austin Mueller #72 PF	Recruit ratings: Scout: Rivals: (69)				
Overall recruit ranking: Scout: – Rivals: –
Note: In many cases, Scout, Rivals, 247Sports, On3, and ESPN may conflict in their listings of height and weight.; In these cases, the average was taken. ESPN grades are on a 100-point scale.; Sources: "2016 Team Ranking". Rivals.

=== 2017 recruiting class ===
College recruiting (2017)
Name	Hometown	School	Height	Weight	Commit date
Hunter Maldonado; SF	Colorado Springs, CO	Vista Ridge HS	6 ft 5 in (1.96 m)	180 lb (82 kg)	Jun 6, 2016
Hunter Maldonado; SF	Recruit ratings: Scout: Rivals: 247Sports: ESPN:				
Hunter Thompson; C	Pine Bluffs, WY	Pine Bluffs High School	6 ft 9 in (2.06 m)	225 lb (102 kg)	Sep 6, 2016
Hunter Thompson; C	Recruit ratings: Scout: Rivals: 247Sports: ESPN:				
Anthony Mack; SG	Blairstown, NJ	Blair Academy	6 ft 5 in (1.96 m)	215 lb (98 kg)	Nov 2, 2016
Anthony Mack; SG	Recruit ratings: Scout: Rivals: 247Sports: ESPN:				
Overall recruit ranking: Scout: – Rivals: –
Note: In many cases, Scout, Rivals, 247Sports, On3, and ESPN may conflict in their listings of height and weight.; In these cases, the average was taken. ESPN grades are on a 100-point scale.; Sources: "ESPN – Wyoming Cowboys Basketball Recruiting 2017". ESPN.; "2017 Team Ranking". Rivals.

== Roster ==
2016–17 Wyoming Cowboys men's basketball team
Players
Coaches

Pos.	#	Name	Height	Weight	Year	Previous school	Hometown
G	0	Nyaires Redding (I, W) (redshirt)	6 ft 2 in (1.88 m)	166 lb (75 kg)	Jr	Westwind Prep; Washington State	Solon, OH
G	1	Justin James	6 ft 7 in (2.01 m)	180 lb (82 kg)	So	Oldsmar Christian HS	Port Saint Lucie, FL
G	3	Alexander Aka Gorski	6 ft 5 in (1.96 m)	205 lb (93 kg)	Jr	Sunrise Christian Academy	Lund, Sweden
F	5	Alan Herndon	6 ft 9 in (2.06 m)	210 lb (95 kg)	RS Jr	Widefield HS	Colorado Springs, CO
G	11	Jeremy Lieberman	6 ft 1 in (1.85 m)	175 lb (79 kg)	Jr	Calabasas HS	Calabasas, CA
G	12	Cody Kelly (W)	5 ft 11 in (1.8 m)	180 lb (82 kg)	RS Fr	Campbell County HS	Gillette, WY
G	13	Sam Averbuck (W)	6 ft 4 in (1.93 m)	185 lb (84 kg)	RS Fr	Suffield Academy	Santa Rosa, CA
F	14	Austin Mueller (redshirt)	6 ft 6 in (1.98 m)	200 lb (91 kg)	Fr	ThunderRidge HS	Highlands Ranch, CO
F	15	Brodricks Jones (I) (redshirt)	6 ft 10 in (2.08 m)	220 lb (100 kg)	So	Lawndale HS; UTEP	Los Angeles, CA
F	20	Hayden Dalton	6 ft 8 in (2.03 m)	185 lb (84 kg)	Jr	Chaparral HS; Central Wyoming College	Parker, CO
C	21	Jonathan Barnes	6 ft 10 in (2.08 m)	245 lb (111 kg)	Jr	Ponderosa HS	Parker, CO
G	23	Jason McManamen	6 ft 5 in (1.96 m)	195 lb (88 kg)	RS Sr	Torrington HS	Torrington, WY
G	24	Louis Adams	6 ft 4 in (1.93 m)	185 lb (84 kg)	Jr	Orr Academy HS; Odessa College	Chicago, IL
G	25	Morris Marshall	6 ft 4 in (1.93 m)	180 lb (82 kg)	Sr	Columbia HS; Santa Fe College	White Springs, FL
F	32	Andrew Moemeka	6 ft 8 in (2.03 m)	210 lb (95 kg)	RS Fr	Oldsmar Christian HS	Lake City, FL
F	33	Jordan Naughton	6 ft 10 in (2.08 m)	225 lb (102 kg)	So	Etiwanda HS	Rancho Cucamonga, CA

Head coach

- Allen Edwards (Kentucky)

Assistant coach(es)

- Jeremy Shyatt (Clemson)
- Tony Pujol (Sterling (KS))
- Jermaine Kimbrough (Virginia Tech)

Legend

- (C) Team captain
- (S) Suspended
- (I) Ineligible
- (W) Walk-on
- Injured
- Current redshirt

Roster

== Statistics ==
Player	GP	GS	MPG	FG%	3FG%	FT%	RPG	APG	BPG	SPG	PPG
Louis Adams	34	16	14.6	.434	.277	.756	2.6	1.0	0.2	0.4	7.6
Alexander Aka Gorski	33	15	21.5	.399	.344	.778	2.3	1.5	0.0	0.5	7.7
Sam Averbuck	6	0	5.3	.167	.000	1.000	0.3	0.7	0.0	0.0	0.7
Jonathan Barnes	15	5	5.4	.545	.000	.636	1.1	0.0	0.1	0.1	1.3
Hayden Dalton	38	3	27.0	.431	.347	.834	8.3	2.6	0.9	0.4	12.2
Alan Herndon	38	38	31.1	.466	.379	.629	6.0	1.3	1.9	0.6	11.1
Justin James	37	6	26.2	.462	.419	.762	5.0	2.2	0.5	0.8	16.0
Cody Kelley	34	1	12.6	.392	.385	.542	1.3	1.5	0.0	0.6	3.4
Jeremy Lieberman	37	37	22.6	.418	.293	.765	2.0	2.5	0.1	0.9	4.8
Morris Marshall	14	1	6.2	.318	.375	.778	1.1	0.3	0.1	0.1	1.7
Jason McManamen	38	38	31.9	.356	.331	.712	3.0	2.4	0.0	0.6	11.3
Andrew Moemeka	26	4	7.8	.667	.000	.500	2.5	0.2	0.4	0.5	1.7
Jordan Naughton	37	26	12.5	.602	.000	.554	2.8	0.2	0.5	0.1	4.4

== Schedule and results ==
Date time, TV	Rank^{#}	Opponent^{#}	Result	Record	Site (attendance) city, state
Exhibition
11/03/2016*; 7:00 pm		Chadron State	W 75–50		Petsch Activities Center (1,184); Torrington, WY
Non-conference regular season
11/11/2016*; 8:30 pm		Western State (CO)	W 88–49	1–0	Arena-Auditorium (5,008); Laramie, WY
11/14/2016*; 7:00 pm		at Montana	W 73–72	2–0	Dahlberg Arena (3,318); Missoula, MT
11/19/2016*; 7:00 pm		South Dakota State	W 77–67	3–0	Arena-Auditorium (6,833); Laramie, WY
11/22/2016*; 8:00 pm		at Pacific	L 65–73	3–1	Alex G. Spanos Center (1,730); Stockton, CA
11/24/2016*; 9:00 pm, P12N		at California	L 61–71	3–2	Haas Pavilion (8,355); Berkeley, CA
11/29/2016*; 7:00 pm		Denver	W 82–70	4–2	Arena-Auditorium (4,106); Laramie, WY
12/03/2016*; 1:00 pm, MWN		Northern Iowa; MW–MVC Challenge	W 81–73	5–2	Arena-Auditorium (5,539); Laramie, WY
12/05/2016*; 7:00 pm		Colorado Christian	W 67–60	6–2	Arena-Auditorium (3,204); Laramie, WY
12/10/2016*; 4:00 pm		Montana	W 85–83	7–2	Arena-Auditorium (4,749); Laramie, WY
12/17/2016*; 4:00 pm		Cornell; Las Vegas Classic	W 97–78	8–2	Arena-Auditorium (3,929); Laramie, WY
12/19/2016*; 7:00 pm		Troy; Las Vegas Classic	W 72–66	9–2	Arena-Auditorium (3,204); Laramie, WY
12/22/2016*; 5:30 pm, FS1		vs. DePaul; Las Vegas Classic semifinals	W 72–58	10–2	Orleans Arena (2,154); Paradise, NV
12/23/2016*; 9:00 pm, FS1		vs. No. 23 USC; Las Vegas Classic championship	L 92–94 ^{OT}	10–3	Orleans Arena (2,270); Paradise, NV
Mountain West regular season
12/28/2016; 7:00 pm		Air Force	W 84–72	11–3 (1–0)	Arena-Auditorium (5,021); Laramie, WY
12/31/2016; 2:00 pm		at UNLV	L 75–81	11–4 (1–1)	Thomas & Mack Center (9,352); Paradise, NV
01/04/2017; 8:00 pm		at Fresno State	L 70–85	11–5 (1–2)	Save Mart Center (6,437); Fresno, CA
01/11/2017; 7:00 pm, RTRM		Utah State	W 95–87	12–5 (2–2)	Arena-Auditorium (4,547); Laramie, WY
01/14/2017; 4:00 pm, ESPN3		Nevada	L 74–89	12–6 (2–3)	Arena-Auditorium (4,794); Laramie, WY
01/18/2017; 8:00 pm		at San Jose State	W 80–70	13–6 (3–3)	Event Center Arena (1,468); San Jose, CA
01/21/2017; 6:00 pm, CBSSN		at New Mexico	L 71–78	13–7 (3–4)	The Pit (12,501); Albuquerque, NM
01/25/2017; 7:00 pm		UNLV	W 66–65	14–7 (4–4)	Arena-Auditorium (5,019); Laramie, WY
01/28/2017; 4:00 pm, RTRM		Boise State	L 65–80	14–8 (4–5)	Arena-Auditorium (6,552); Laramie, WY
01/31/2017; 9:00 pm, CBSSN		at San Diego State	L 68–77	14–9 (4–6)	Viejas Arena (11,883); San Diego, CA
02/04/2017; 2:00 pm		at Air Force	W 83–74	15–9 (5–6)	Clune Arena (3,852); Colorado Springs, CO
02/08/2017; 7:00 pm		Fresno State	W 102–100 ^{4OT}	16–9 (6–6)	Arena-Auditorium (4,156); Laramie, WY
02/11/2017; 7:00 pm		at Utah State	L 74–81	16–10 (6–7)	Smith Spectrum (7,027); Logan, UT
02/15/2017; 7:00 pm, RTRM		Colorado State; Border War	L 73–78	16–11 (6–8)	Arena-Auditorium (5,812); Laramie, WY
02/18/2017; 4:00 pm, RTRM		at Boise State	L 87–91	16–12 (6–9)	Taco Bell Arena (7,420); Boise, ID
02/25/2017; 4:00 pm, ESPN3		New Mexico	W 82–71	17–12 (7–9)	Arena-Auditorium (5,354); Laramie, WY
03/01/2017; 8:00 pm, RTRM		at Colorado State; Border War	L 76–78	17–13 (7–10)	Moby Arena (7,883); Fort Collins, CO
03/04/2017; 2:00 pm		San Jose State	W 74–62	18–13 (8–10)	Arena-Auditorium (5,931); Laramie, WY
Mountain West tournament
03/08/2017; 2:30 pm, MWN	(7)	vs. (10) Air Force; First Round	L 68–83	18–14	Thomas & Mack Center (4,979); Paradise, NV
CBI
03/15/2017*; 7:00 pm		Eastern Washington; First Round	W 91–81	19–14	Arena-Auditorium (1,803); Laramie, WY
03/20/2017*; 7:00 pm		UMKC; Quarterfinals	W 72–61	20–14	Arena-Auditorium (2,311); Laramie, WY
03/22/2017*; 7:00 pm		Utah Valley; Semifinals	W 74–68	21–14	Arena-Auditorium (2,577); Laramie, WY
03/27/2017*; 6:30 pm, ESPNU		at Coastal Carolina; Finals – Game 1	L 81–91	21–15	HTC Center (1,583); Conway, SC
03/29/2017*; 6:30 pm, ESPNU		Coastal Carolina; Finals – Game 2	W 81–57	22–15	Arena-Auditorium (3,811); Laramie, WY
03/31/2017*; 5:00 pm, ESPNU		Coastal Carolina; Finals – Game 3	W 83–59	23–15	Arena-Auditorium (6,321); Laramie, WY
*Non-conference game. ^{#}Rankings from AP Poll. (#) Tournament seedings in parentheses. All times are in Mountain Time.
