= Paul Weir (basketball) =

Former basketball coach, current high school administrator (born 1979)

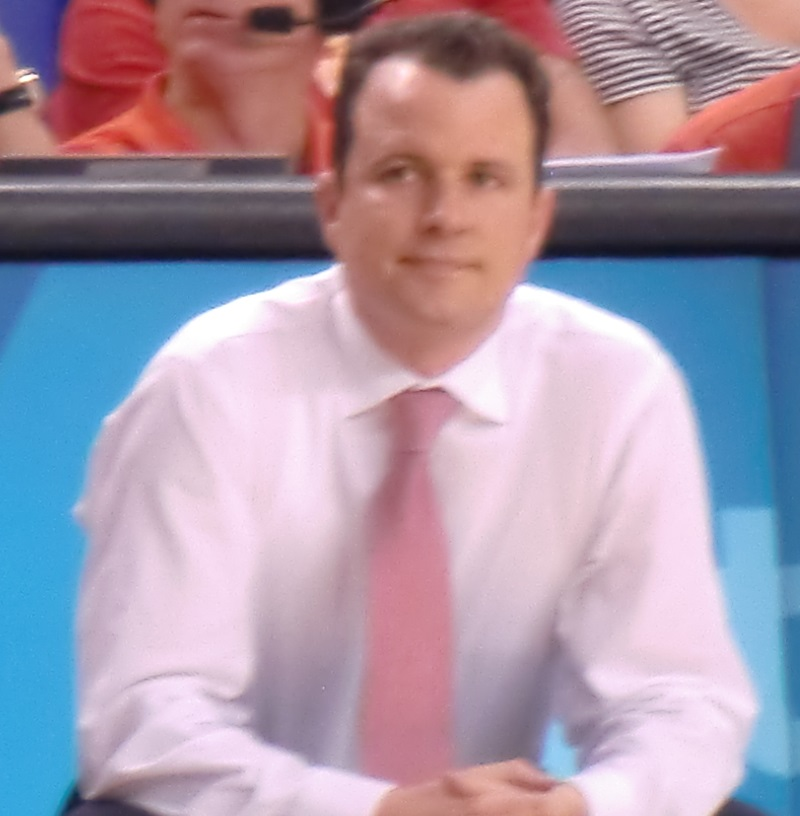
- Weir in 2018

Biographical details
- Born: June 12, 1979 (age 46); Toronto, Ontario, Canada

Playing career
- 1998–1999: York
- Position: Point guard

Coaching career (HC unless noted)
- 1999–2003: Don Bosco Catholic
- 2004–2005: Northwestern State (assistant)
- 2005–2007: Iowa (assistant)
- 2007–2016: New Mexico State (assistant)
- 2016–2017: New Mexico State
- 2017–2021: New Mexico

Administrative career (AD unless noted)
- 2021–2023: Eastern New Mexico
- 2023–2026: Abilene Christian University (Associate Vice President for Athletics)
- 2026–present: St. Michael's High School (President)

Head coaching record
- Overall: 86–69 (.555) (college)
- Tournaments: 0–1 (NCAA Division I)

Accomplishments and honors

Championships
- WAC tournament (2017)

Paul Michael Weir (born June 12, 1979) is the president of St. Michael's High School, a private Catholic school in Santa Fe, New Mexico. Weir was previously associate vice president for athletics at Abilene Christian University from 2023–26, and athletic director at Eastern New Mexico University from 2021–23.

Weir earned a doctorate degree in educational leadership from New Mexico State University in 2019. He also holds three master's degrees: in health and human performance from Northwestern State (2005); sports psychology from Iowa (2010); and business administration from New Mexico State (2012). Weir grew up in Toronto, Canada and graduated from Iona Catholic Secondary School, earning all-regional and city honors playing point guard for the basketball team. He earned a bachelor's degree from York University in Toronto in 2004.

Weir was formerly head men's basketball coach of the University of New Mexico from 2017 to 2021. He was previously head coach of New Mexico State for one season, going 28–6 and winning the Western Athletic Conference tournament. He was an assistant at NMSU from 2007 to 2016, including five seasons as associate head coach. Prior to that he spent two years as an assistant coach under Steve Alford at the University of Iowa, and served as director of basketball operations at Northwestern State for one season. Weir began his coaching career as head coach of Don Bosco Catholic Secondary School in Toronto from 1999 to 2003. He also served as an assistant coach for the Costa Rica national basketball team and head coach of the Canada U-19 team.

== Head coaching record ==
Record table
Season	Team	Overall	Conference	Standing	Postseason
New Mexico State Aggies (Western Athletic Conference) (2016–2017)
2016–17	New Mexico State	28–6	11–3	T–2nd	NCAA Division I first round
New Mexico State:		28–6 (.824)	11–3 (.786)		
New Mexico Lobos (Mountain West Conference) (2017–2021)
2017–18	New Mexico	19–15	12–6	3rd	
2018–19	New Mexico	14–18	7–11	T–7th	
2019–20	New Mexico	19–14	7–11	T–7th	
2020–21	New Mexico	6–16	2–15	11th	
New Mexico:		58–63 (.479)	28–43 (.394)		
Total:		86–69 (.555)			
National champion Postseason invitational champion Conference regular season champion Conference regular season and conference tournament champion Division regular season champion Division regular season and conference tournament champion Conference tournament champion
