= Louis Adams =

Louis Adams may refer to:

- Louis Adams (basketball, born 1996), American basketball player
- Louis Adams (basketball, born 1990), Senegalese basketball player
