= 2016–17 Cal State Bakersfield Roadrunners men's basketball team =

American college basketball season

2016–17 Cal State Bakersfield Roadrunners men's basketball
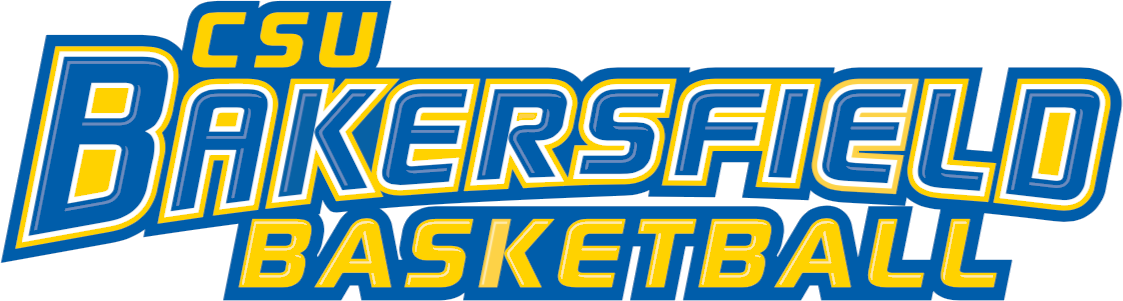

WAC regular season champions

NIT, Semifinals
- Conference: Western Athletic Conference
- Record: 25–10 (12–2 WAC)
- Head coach: Rod Barnes (6th season)
- Assistant coaches: Jeff Conarroe; Benjy Taylor
- Home arena: Icardo Center

2016–17 WAC men's basketball standings
	Conf.				Overall
Team	W		L	PCT	W		L	PCT
Cal State Bakersfield	12	–	2	.857	25	–	10	.714
New Mexico State †	11	–	3	.786	28	–	6	.824
Grand Canyon *	11	–	3	.786	22	–	9	.710
UMKC	8	–	6	.571	18	–	17	.514
Utah Valley	6	–	8	.429	17	–	17	.500
Seattle	5	–	9	.357	13	–	17	.433
Texas–Rio Grande Valley	2	–	12	.143	10	–	22	.313
Chicago State	1	–	13	.071	6	–	26	.188
† 2017 WAC tournament winner * Ineligible for postseason during transition to NCAA Division I.

The 2016–17 Cal State Bakersfield Roadrunners men's basketball team represented California State University, Bakersfield during the 2016–17 NCAA Division I men's basketball season. The Roadrunners, led by sixth-year head coach Rod Barnes, played their home games at the Icardo Center as members of the Western Athletic Conference. They finished the season 25–10, 12–2 in WAC play to win the regular season WAC championship. They defeated Utah Valley to advance to the championship game of the WAC tournament where they lost to New Mexico State. As a regular season conference champion who failed to win their conference tournament, they received an automatic bid to the National Invitation Tournament. As a No. 8 seed, they defeated California, Colorado State, and Texas–Arlington to become the first No. 8 seed to advance to the semifinals since the NIT introduced seeding in 2006. In the semifinals at Madison Square Garden they lost to Georgia Tech.

== Previous season ==
The Roadrunners finished the 2015–16 season 24–9, 11–3 in WAC play to finish in a tie for second place. They defeated Chicago State, Seattle, and New Mexico State to win the WAC tournament. As a result, they earned the conference's automatic bid to the NCAA tournament, their first ever appearance, where they lost in the first round to Oklahoma.

== Offseason ==
=== Departures ===
Name	Number	Pos.	Height	Weight	Year	Hometown	Notes
Kyle Ferreira	2	G	6'3"	190	Sophomore	Bakersfield, CA	Walk-on; left the team for personal reasons
Darryl Geyen	3	G	5'10"	165	Freshman	Houston, TX	Walk-on; left the team for personal reasons
Kevin Mays	10	F	6'4"	220	Senior	Queens, NY	Graduated
Ravonn Posey	12	F	6'8"	280	Junior	Milwaukee, WI	Transferred to Cleveland State
Justin Hollins	33	F	6'8"	205	Junior	Cypress, TX	Transferred
Aly Ahmed	42	C	6'9"	250	Senior	Alexandria, Egypt	Graduated

=== Incoming transfers ===
Name	Number	Pos.	Height	Weight	Year	Hometown	Previous School
James Suber	4	F	6'6"	210	Junior	Philadelphia, PA	Junior college transferred from Panola College
Fallou Ndoye	15	C	6'11"	220	RS Junior	Dakar, Senegal	Transferred from Mississippi State. Under NCAA transfer rules, Ndoye will have to sit out for the 2016–17 season. Will have two years of remaining eligibility.
Moataz Aly	22	F	6'9"	200	Junior	Alexandria, Egypt	Junior college transferred from Hutchinson CC

=== 2016 incoming recruits ===
College recruiting information
Name	Hometown	School	Height	Weight	Commit date
Justin Davis #86 SF	San Diego, CA	Morse High School	6 ft 4 in (1.93 m)	180 lb (82 kg)	Aug 8, 2015
Justin Davis #86 SF	Recruit ratings: Scout: Rivals: (64)				
Tazé Moore; SF	Southaven, MS	Southaven High School	6 ft 5 in (1.96 m)	180 lb (82 kg)	
Tazé Moore; SF	Recruit ratings: Scout: Rivals: (0)				
Greg Lee; SG	Houston, TX	Westside High School	6 ft 7 in (2.01 m)	185 lb (84 kg)	
Greg Lee; SG	Recruit ratings: Scout: Rivals: (0)				
Overall recruit ranking:
Note: In many cases, Scout, Rivals, 247Sports, On3, and ESPN may conflict in their listings of height and weight.; In these cases, the average was taken. ESPN grades are on a 100-point scale.; Sources: "2016 Team Ranking". Rivals.

=== 2017 recruiting class ===
College recruiting information (2017)
Name	Hometown	School	Height	Weight	Commit date
Darrin Persons #78 PF	Clovis, CA	Immanuel High School	6 ft 5 in (1.96 m)	195 lb (88 kg)	Aug 8, 2015
Darrin Persons #78 PF	Recruit ratings: Scout: Rivals: (64)				
Justin McCall; SG	Bakersfield, CA	Ridgeview High School	6 ft 5 in (1.96 m)	195 lb (88 kg)	Aug 15, 2016
Justin McCall; SG	Recruit ratings: Scout: Rivals: (NR)				
Overall recruit ranking:
Note: In many cases, Scout, Rivals, 247Sports, On3, and ESPN may conflict in their listings of height and weight.; In these cases, the average was taken. ESPN grades are on a 100-point scale.; Sources: "2017 Team Ranking". Rivals.

=== 2018 recruiting class ===
College recruiting information (2018)
Name	Hometown	School	Height	Weight	Commit date
Ronnie Stapp; SF	Bakersfield, CA	Bakersfield High School	6 ft 65 in (3.48 m)	195 lb (88 kg)	Apr 1, 2016
Ronnie Stapp; SF	Recruit ratings: Scout: Rivals: (NR)				
Overall recruit ranking:
Note: In many cases, Scout, Rivals, 247Sports, On3, and ESPN may conflict in their listings of height and weight.; In these cases, the average was taken. ESPN grades are on a 100-point scale.; Sources: "2018 Team Ranking". Rivals.

== Roster ==
2016–17 Cal State Bakersfield Roadrunners men's basketball team
Players
Coaches

Pos.	#	Name	Height	Weight	Year	Previous school	Hometown
F	0	Matt Smith	6 ft 6 in (1.98 m)	190 lb (86 kg)	RS Sr	Columbia State CC; Liberty Tech HS	Jackson, MS
G	1	Brent Wrapp	6 ft 3 in (1.91 m)	175 lb (79 kg)	RS Jr	Fairview HS	Boulder, CO
F	3	Tazé Moore	6 ft 5 in (1.96 m)	180 lb (82 kg)	Fr	Southaven HS	Southaven, MS
F	4	James Suber	6 ft 7 in (2.01 m)	210 lb (95 kg)	Jr	Panola College; Philadelphia Electrical & Tech Charter HS	Philadelphia, PA
G	5	Dedrick Basile	5 ft 10 in (1.78 m)	160 lb (73 kg)	Sr	Trinity CC; Madison HS	Houston, TX
G/F	10	Justin Davis	6 ft 4 in (1.93 m)	180 lb (82 kg)	Fr	Morse HS	San Diego, CA
F	11	Jaylin Airington	6 ft 4 in (1.93 m)	190 lb (86 kg)	RS Sr	Ventura College; Bowman Leadership Academy	East Chicago, IN
G/F	13	Shon Briggs	6 ft 4 in (1.93 m)	200 lb (91 kg)	RS Jr	San Francisco City; Heritage HS	Brentwood, CA
C	15	Fallou Ndoye	6 ft 11 in (2.11 m)	225 lb (102 kg)	RS Jr	Mississippi State; Findlay Prep	Ta'if, Senegal
G	21	Greg Lee	6 ft 7 in (2.01 m)	200 lb (91 kg)	Fr	Westside HS	Houston, TX
C	22	Moataz Aly	6 ft 10 in (2.08 m)	205 lb (93 kg)	Jr	Hutchinson CC; Sunrise Christian Academy	Alexandria, Egypt
G	23	Damiyne Durham	6 ft 4 in (1.93 m)	175 lb (79 kg)	RS So	Oakwood HS	Houston, TX
F	24	Bray Barnes (W)	6 ft 5 in (1.96 m)	185 lb (84 kg)	RS So	Liberty HS	Bakersfield, CA
G	51	Justin Pride	5 ft 10 in (1.78 m)	180 lb (82 kg)	Sr	Columbia State CC; Butler HS	Huntsville, AL

Head coach

- Rod Barnes (Mississippi)

Assistant coach(es)

- Jeff Conarroe (Colorado College)
- J. D. Pollock (Kennesaw State)
- Benjy Taylor (Richmond)

Legend

- (C) Team captain
- (S) Suspended
- (I) Ineligible
- (W) Walk-on
- Injured
- Current redshirt

Roster

== Schedule and results ==
Date time, TV	Rank^{#}	Opponent^{#}	Result	Record	Site (attendance) city, state
Exhibition
11/09/2016*; 7:00 pm		The Master's College	W 82–63		Icardo Center (1,232); Bakersfield, CA
Non-conference regular season
11/11/2016*; 7:00 pm		San Diego Christian	W 96–54	1–0	Icardo Center (1,566); Bakersfield, CA
11/15/2016*; 7:00 pm, P12N		at No. 10 Arizona	L 66–78	1–1	McKale Center (14,214); Tucson, AZ
11/19/2016*; 7:00 pm		UC Santa Barbara; Homecoming	W 77–70	2–1	Icardo Center (1,897); Bakersfield, CA
11/22/2016*; 7:00 pm		Fresno State	W 71–63	3–1	Icardo Center (3,497); Bakersfield, CA
11/25/2016*; 1:00 pm		at Wright State; Men vs. Cancer Classic	L 64–68	3–2	Nutter Center (3,123); Dayton, OH
11/26/2016*; 1:30 pm		vs. North Florida; Men vs. Cancer Classic	W 77–54	4–2	Nutter Center (3,024); Dayton, OH
11/27/2016*; 11:00 am		vs. North Dakota; Men vs. Cancer Classic	L 55–57	4–3	Nutter Center (2,975); Dayton, OH
11/30/2016*; 7:00 pm		Pacific Union	W 79–46	5–3	Icardo Center (1,699); Bakersfield, CA
12/02/2016*; 5:00 pm, ESPN3		at SMU	L 43–49	5–4	Moody Coliseum (6,852); Dallas, TX
12/05/2016*; 5:30 pm		at Northern Arizona	W 81–47	6–4	Walkup Skydome (678); Flagstaff, AZ
12/10/2016*; 7:00 pm		Portland State	W 81–79	7–4	Icardo Center (1,733); Bakersfield, CA
12/15/2016*; 12:00 pm		Bethesda	W 105–78	8–4	Icardo Center (3,497); Bakersfield, CA
12/22/2016*; 6:00 pm, BYUtv		at BYU	L 71–81	8–5	Marriott Center (15,073); Provo, UT
12/27/2016*; 7:00 pm		at UC Santa Barbara	L 60–62 ^{OT}	8–6	UCSB Events Center (1,191); Santa Barbara, CA
01/03/2017*; 4:00 pm		at Dartmouth	W 64–60	9–6	Leede Arena (400); Hanover, NH
WAC regular season
01/07/2017; 7:00 pm		Seattle	W 78–71	10–6 (1–0)	Icardo Center (2,967); Bakersfield, CA
01/12/2017; 5:00 pm		at Texas–Rio Grande Valley	W 88–81	11–6 (2–0)	UTRGV Fieldhouse (1,330); Edinburg, TX
01/14/2017; 6:00 pm		at New Mexico State	L 58–63	11–7 (2–1)	Pan American Center (4,295); Las Cruces, NM
01/21/2017; 7:00 pm, ASN		Utah Valley	W 68–65	12–7 (3–1)	Icardo Center (3,497); Bakersfield, CA
01/26/2017; 5:00 pm		at Chicago State	W 75–59	13–7 (4–1)	Jones Convention Center (1,354); Chicago, IL
01/28/2017; 5:00 pm		at UMKC	W 74–63	14–7 (5–1)	Municipal Auditorium (1,587); Kansas City, MO
02/04/2017; 6:00 pm		at Grand Canyon	W 65–62	15–7 (6–1)	GCU Arena (7,237); Phoenix, AZ
02/09/2017; 7:00 pm		New Mexico State	W 72–53	16–7 (7–1)	Icardo Center (3,497); Bakersfield, CA
02/11/2017; 7:00 pm		Texas–Rio Grande Valley	W 75–53	17–7 (8–1)	Icardo Center (2,312); Bakersfield, CA
02/16/2017; 6:00 pm		at Utah Valley	W 80–71	18–7 (9–1)	UCCU Center (1,255); Orem, UT
02/18/2017; 7:00 pm		at Seattle	W 51–48	19–7 (10–1)	Connolly Center (912); Seattle, WA
02/23/2017; 7:00 pm		UMKC	W 71–62	20–7 (11–1)	Icardo Center (2,233); Bakersfield, CA
02/25/2017; 7:00 pm		Chicago State	W 69–49	21–7 (12–1)	Icardo Center (3,213); Bakersfield, CA
03/04/2017; 7:30 pm, ASN		Grand Canyon	L 52–58	21–8 (12–2)	Icardo Center (3,298); Bakersfield, CA
WAC tournament
03/10/2017; 6:00 pm, ESPN3	(1)	vs. (4) Utah Valley; Semifinals	W 81–80 ^{4OT}	22–8	Orleans Arena (2,190); Paradise, NV
03/11/2017; 8:00 pm, ESPNU	(1)	vs. (2) New Mexico State; Championship	L 60–70	22–9	Orleans Arena (2,444); Paradise, NV
NIT
03/14/2017*; 8:15 pm, ESPN2	(8)	at (1) California; First Round – California Bracket	W 73–66	23–9	Haas Pavilion (1,778); Berkeley, CA
03/20/2017*; 8:15 pm, ESPN2	(8)	at (4) Colorado State; Second Round – California Bracket	W 81–63	24–9	Moby Arena (4,203); Fort Collins, CO
03/22/2017*; 6:00 pm, ESPNU	(8)	at (6) UT Arlington; Quarterfinals – California Bracket	W 80–76	25–9	College Park Center (6,336); Arlington, TX
03/28/2017*; 4:00 pm, ESPN	(8)	vs. (6) Georgia Tech; Semifinals	L 61–76	25–10	Madison Square Garden (5,210); New York City, NY
*Non-conference game. ^{#}Rankings from AP Poll. (#) Tournament seedings in parentheses. All times are in Pacific Time Source.
