= 2016–17 Seattle Redhawks men's basketball team =

American college basketball season

2016–17 Seattle Redhawks men's basketball
- Conference: Western Athletic Conference
- Record: 13–17 (5–9 WAC)
- Head coach: Cameron Dollar (8th season)
- Assistant coaches: Mike Jones; Lance LaVetter; Darren Talley
- Home arena: KeyArena; Connolly Center

2016–17 WAC men's basketball standings
	Conf.				Overall
Team	W		L	PCT	W		L	PCT
Cal State Bakersfield	12	–	2	.857	25	–	10	.714
New Mexico State †	11	–	3	.786	28	–	6	.824
Grand Canyon *	11	–	3	.786	22	–	9	.710
UMKC	8	–	6	.571	18	–	17	.514
Utah Valley	6	–	8	.429	17	–	17	.500
Seattle	5	–	9	.357	13	–	17	.433
Texas–Rio Grande Valley	2	–	12	.143	10	–	22	.313
Chicago State	1	–	13	.071	6	–	26	.188
† 2017 WAC tournament winner * Ineligible for postseason during transition to NCAA Division I.

The 2016–17 Seattle Redhawks men's basketball team represented Seattle University during the 2016–17 NCAA Division I men's basketball season. The Redhawks, led by eighth-year head coach Cameron Dollar, played their home games at KeyArena and six games at the Connolly Center as members of the Western Athletic Conference. They finished the season 13–17, 5–9 WAC play to finish in fifth place. Due to Grand Canyon's postseason ineligibility, they received the No. 4 seed in the WAC tournament where they lost in the quarterfinals to Utah Valley.

On March 13, 2017, the school fired head coach Cameron Dollar. His eight-year record at the school was 107–138. On March 29, the school hired Jim Hayford from in-state rival Eastern Washington as their new head coach.

== Previous season ==
The Redhawks finished the 2015–16 season 15–17, 7–7 in WAC play to finish in fourth place. They defeated Texas–Rio Grande Valley in the quarterfinals of the WAC tournament before losing to Cal State Bakersfield in the semifinals. They were invited to the College Basketball Invitational where they defeated Idaho in the first round to advance to the quarterfinals where they lost to Vermont.

== Offseason ==
=== Departures ===
Name	Number	Pos.	Height	Weight	Year	Hometown	Notes
Deshaun Sunderhaus	11	F	6'9"	215	RS Senior	Conyers, GA	Graduated
Jadon Cohee	12	G	6'4"	182	Sophomore	Langley, BC	Transferred to Southern Utah
Jack Crook	24	C	6'11"	255	Senior	Manchester, England	Graduated

=== Recruiting class of 2016 ===
College recruiting information
Name	Hometown	School	Height	Weight	Commit date
Morgan Means #70 SG	Torrance, CA	Redondo Union High School	6 ft 2 in (1.88 m)	165 lb (75 kg)	Mar 30, 2016
Morgan Means #70 SG	Recruit ratings: Scout: Rivals: (68)				
Marcel Kliniewski #82 C	Lee, ME	Lee Academy	7 ft 1 in (2.16 m)	262 lb (119 kg)	Nov 19, 2015
Marcel Kliniewski #82 C	Recruit ratings: Scout: Rivals: (56)				
Mattia Da Campo; SG	Rome, Italy	Stella Azzurra	6 ft 5 in (1.96 m)	N/A	
Mattia Da Campo; SG	Recruit ratings: Scout: Rivals: (NR)				
Overall recruit ranking:
Note: In many cases, Scout, Rivals, 247Sports, On3, and ESPN may conflict in their listings of height and weight.; In these cases, the average was taken. ESPN grades are on a 100-point scale.; Sources: "2016 Team Ranking". Rivals.

== Roster ==
2016–17 Seattle Redhawks men's basketball team
Players
Coaches

Pos.	#	Name	Height	Weight	Year	Previous school	Hometown
G	0	Brandan Westendorf	6 ft 5 in (1.96 m)	195 lb (88 kg)	RS Sr	Kentridge HS; Big Bend CC	Auburn, WA
G	1	Morgan Means	6 ft 0 in (1.83 m)	160 lb (73 kg)	Fr	Redondo Union HS	Compton, CA
G	2	Malik Montoya	6 ft 5 in (1.96 m)	190 lb (86 kg)	So	Federal Way HS	Federal Way, WA
G	5	Matej Kavas	6 ft 7 in (2.01 m)	200 lb (91 kg)	RS Fr	Gimnazija Bezigrad HS	Ljubljana, Slovenia
F	11	Scott Ulaneo	6 ft 10 in (2.08 m)	215 lb (98 kg)	Fr	Stella Azura Academy	Rome, Italy
G	12	Mattia Da Campo	6 ft 5 in (1.96 m)	210 lb (95 kg)	Fr	Stella Azura Academy	Venice, Italy
G	13	Emmanuel Chibuogwu (W)	6 ft 6 in (1.98 m)	215 lb (98 kg)	RS Sr	Shorecrest HS	Shoreline, WA
G	14	Jack Shaughnessy	6 ft 2 in (1.88 m)	190 lb (86 kg)	RS So	Etowah HS	Woodstock, GA
G	15	Jake Spurgeon	6 ft 5 in (1.96 m)	210 lb (95 kg)	So	Lakeridge HS	Lake Oswego, OR
F	21	William Powell	6 ft 6 in (1.98 m)	225 lb (102 kg)	Sr	IMG Acad. Huntsville HS	Huntsville, AL
G	23	Manroop Clair	6 ft 2 in (1.88 m)	185 lb (84 kg)	RS Sr	Hawaii; Huntington Prep	Vancouver, BC
F	30	Zack Moore	6 ft 5 in (1.96 m)	200 lb (91 kg)	So	Bellevue HS	Bellevue, WA
C	41	Aaron Menzies	7 ft 3 in (2.21 m)	295 lb (134 kg)	RS So	Loreto Academy	Manchester, England
F	42	Marko Cuze	6 ft 9 in (2.06 m)	235 lb (107 kg)	Fr	Spire Institute	Zagreb, Croatia

Head coach

- Cameron Dollar (UCLA)

Assistant coach(es)

- Mike Jones (Azusa Pacific)
- Lance LaVetter (Northern Arizona)
- Darren Talley (Chapman)

Legend

- (C) Team captain
- (S) Suspended
- (I) Ineligible
- (W) Walk-on
- Injured
- Current redshirt

Roster

== Schedule and results ==
Date time, TV	Rank^{#}	Opponent^{#}	Result	Record	Site (attendance) city, state
Non-conference regular season
11/11/2016*; 8:00 pm		Pacific Lutheran	W 76–65	1–0	Connolly Center (803); Seattle, WA
11/14/2016*; 6:00 pm, P12N		at Colorado; Legends Classic campus-site game	L 55–67	1–1	Coors Events Center (6,883); Boulder, CO
11/16/2016*; 4:00 pm, ACCN Extra		at Notre Dame; Legends Classic campus-site game	L 49–92	1–2	Edmund P. Joyce Center (6,598); South Bend, IN
11/21/2016*; 3:35 pm		vs. Louisiana–Monroe; Legends Classic	W 81–75 ^{OT}	2–2	Reese Court (300); Cheney, WA
11/22/2016*; 6:05 pm		at Eastern Washington; Legends Classic	L 76–80 ^{2OT}	2–3	Reese Court (922); Cheney, WA
11/26/2016*; 4:30 pm, ESPN3		at UCF; Orlando Classic	L 51–67	2–4	CFE Arena (6,804); Orlando, FL
12/01/2016*; 7:00 pm		Northwest	W 82–65	3–4	KeyArena (804); Seattle, WA
12/04/2016*; 1:00 pm		Eastern Washington	L 88–93	3–5	KeyArena (1,058); Seattle, WA
12/10/2016*; 7:00 pm		Great Falls	W 90–49	4–5	Connolly Center (788); Seattle, WA
12/12/2016*; 7:00 pm		Arkansas–Pine Bluff	W 63–58	5–5	Connolly Center (747); Seattle, WA
12/15/2016*; 7:00 pm		Mississippi Valley State	W 82–67	6–5	Connolly Center (811); Seattle, WA
12/19/2016*; 7:00 pm		Southern Utah	W 89–75	7–5	KeyArena (1,235); Seattle, WA
12/22/2016*; 7:00 pm		Washington; Elgin Baylor Classic	L 72–94	7–6	KeyArena (6,163); Seattle, WA
12/28/2016*; 7:00 pm		UC Davis	L 65–72	7–7	KeyArena (1,261); Seattle, WA
12/30/2016*; 7:00 pm		at UC Santa Barbara	W 76–70	8–7	The Thunderdome (1,175); Santa Barbara, CA
WAC regular season
01/07/2017; 7:00 pm		at Cal State Bakersfield	L 71–78	8–8 (0–1)	Icardo Center (2,967); Bakersfield, CA
01/12/2017; 7:00 pm		UMKC	L 68–84	8–9 (0–2)	KeyArena (1,031); Seattle, WA
01/14/2017; 7:00 pm		Chicago State	W 65–50	9–9 (1–2)	KeyArena (1,054); Seattle, WA
01/21/2017; 6:00 pm		at Grand Canyon	L 59–61	9–10 (1–3)	GCU Arena (7,320); Phoenix, AZ
01/26/2017; 7:00 pm		New Mexico State	L 56–71	9–11 (1–4)	KeyArena (1,267); Seattle, WA
01/28/2017; 7:00 pm		Texas–Rio Grande Valley	W 96–84	10–11 (2–4)	KeyArena (1,561); Seattle, WA
02/04/2017; 7:00 pm, ASN		Utah Valley	W 63–50	11–11 (3–4)	KeyArena (2,104); Seattle, WA
02/09/2017; 5:00 pm		at Chicago State	W 90–65	12–11 (4–4)	Jones Convocation Center (630); Chicago, IL
02/11/2017; 5:00 pm		at UMKC	L 72–102	12–12 (4–5)	Municipal Auditorium (1,788); Kansas City, MO
02/16/2017; 7:00 pm		Grand Canyon	L 58–61	12–13 (4–6)	Connolly Center (878); Seattle, WA
02/18/2017; 7:00 pm		Cal State Bakersfield	L 48–51	12–14 (4–7)	Connolly Center (912); Seattle, WA
02/23/2017; 5:00 pm		at Texas–Rio Grande Valley	W 86–77	13–14 (5–7)	UTRGV Fieldhouse (1,325); Edinburg, TX
02/25/2017; 6:00 pm		at New Mexico State	L 53–86	13–15 (5–8)	Pan American Center (4,744); Las Cruces, NM
03/04/2017; 6:00 pm		at Utah Valley	L 54–61	13–16 (5–9)	UCCU Center (5,467); Orem, UT
WAC tournament
03/09/2017; 2:00 pm	(5)	vs. (4) Utah Valley; Quarterfinals	L 53–65	13–17	Orleans Arena (1,854); Paradise, NV
*Non-conference game. ^{#}Rankings from AP Poll. (#) Tournament seedings in parentheses. All times are in Pacific Time Source.
