= 2016–17 Chicago State Cougars men's basketball team =

American college basketball season

2016–17 Chicago State Cougars men's basketball
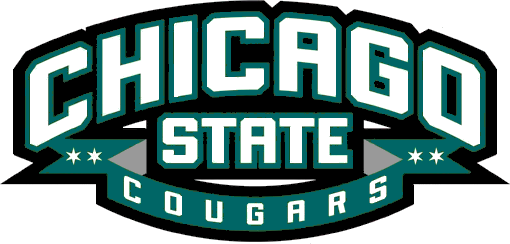
- Conference: Western Athletic Conference
- Record: 6–26 (1–13 WAC)
- Head coach: Tracy Dildy (7th season)
- Assistant coaches: James Farr; Matt Raidbard; Eddie Denard
- Home arena: Jones Convocation Center

2016–17 WAC men's basketball standings
	Conf.				Overall
Team	W		L	PCT	W		L	PCT
Cal State Bakersfield	12	–	2	.857	25	–	10	.714
New Mexico State †	11	–	3	.786	28	–	6	.824
Grand Canyon *	11	–	3	.786	22	–	9	.710
UMKC	8	–	6	.571	18	–	17	.514
Utah Valley	6	–	8	.429	17	–	17	.500
Seattle	5	–	9	.357	13	–	17	.433
Texas–Rio Grande Valley	2	–	12	.143	10	–	22	.313
Chicago State	1	–	13	.071	6	–	26	.188
† 2017 WAC tournament winner * Ineligible for postseason during transition to NCAA Division I.

The 2016–17 Chicago State Cougars men's basketball team represented Chicago State University during the 2016–17 NCAA Division I men's basketball season. The Cougars, led by seventh-year head coach Tracy Dildy, played their home games at the Emil and Patricia Jones Convocation Center as members of the Western Athletic Conference. They finished the season 6–26, 1–13 in WAC play to finish in last place. Due to Grand Canyon's ineligibility for postseason play, they received the No. 7 seed in the WAC tournament where they lost in the quarterfinals to New Mexico State.

== Previous season ==
The Cougars finished the 2015–16 season 4–28, 0–14 in WAC play to finish in last place. They lost in the quarterfinals of the WAC tournament to Cal State Bakersfield.

== Offseason ==
=== Departures ===
Name	Number	Pos.	Height	Weight	Year	Hometown	Notes
Jawad Adekoya	0	G/F	6'6"	190	Senior	Tinley Park, IL	Graduated
Kieran Woods	1	G	6'2"	185	Senior	Chicago, IL	Graduated
Elliot Cole	3	G	5'11"	170	Junior	Chicago, IL	Graduate transferred to College of Charleston
Jared Dimakos	11	G/F	6'5"	205	RS Senior	Lincolnshire, IL	Graduated
Devon Friend	35	F	6'6"	220	Senior	Joliet, IL	Graduated
Quron Davis	44	C	6'10"	235	Junior	Chicago, IL	Transferred

=== Incoming transfers ===
Name	Number	Pos.	Height	Weight	Year	Hometown	Previous School
Glen Burns	0	G	6'3"	190	Junior	West Memphis, AR	Junior college transferred from Danville Area CC
Deionte Simmons	3	C	6'8"	230	Junior	Detroit, MI	Junior college transferred from Danville Area CC
Alex Dubovitsky	10	F	6'6"	208	Junior	Moscow, Russia	Junior college transferred from Arizona Western College
Brian Greene Jr.	35	G	6'3"	210	RS Senior	Chicago, IL	Transferred from Florida Gulf Coast. Will be eligible to play immediately since Greene Jr. graduated from Florida Gulf Coast.

=== 2016 recruiting class ===
College recruiting information
Name	Hometown	School	Height	Weight	Commit date
Patrick Szpir; PF	Wheeling, IL	Wheeling High School	6 ft 9 in (2.06 m)	230 lb (100 kg)	Feb 23, 2016
Patrick Szpir; PF	Recruit ratings: Scout: Rivals: (NR)				
Overall recruit ranking:
Note: In many cases, Scout, Rivals, 247Sports, On3, and ESPN may conflict in their listings of height and weight.; In these cases, the average was taken. ESPN grades are on a 100-point scale.; Sources: "2016 Team Ranking". Rivals.

== Roster ==
2016–17 Chicago State Cougars men's basketball team
Players
Coaches

Pos.	#	Name	Height	Weight	Year	Previous school	Hometown
G	0	Glens Burns	6 ft 3 in (1.91 m)	205 lb (93 kg)	Jr	West Memphis Christian; Danville Area CC	West Memphis, AR
G	2	Clemmye Owens V	6 ft 2 in (1.88 m)	185 lb (84 kg)	Sr	Rogers; Bethune-Cookman	Toledo, OH
G	5	Anthony Eaves	6 ft 2 in (1.88 m)	160 lb (73 kg)	So	Ballard	Louisville, KY
G/F	10	Alex Dubovitsky	6 ft 6 in (1.98 m)	200 lb (91 kg)	Jr	Marianapolis Prep; Arizona Western College	Moscow, Russia
G	11	Delundre Dixon	6 ft 3 in (1.91 m)	180 lb (82 kg)	Fr	Auburn	Rockford, IL
G	14	Fred Sims, Jr.	6 ft 4 in (1.93 m)	193 lb (88 kg)	So	North Lawndale	Chicago, IL
G/F	15	Trayvon Palmer	6 ft 5 in (1.96 m)	200 lb (91 kg)	Sr	Brown Deer; North Dakota State College of Science	Milwaukee, WI
G	21	Joshua Batson	6 ft 0 in (1.83 m)	175 lb (79 kg)	Sr	Curie	Chicago, IL
F/C	23	Patrick Szpir	6 ft 9 in (2.06 m)	230 lb (104 kg)	Fr	Wheeling	Wheeling, IL
G	30	Gentry Hunt (W)	6 ft 3 in (1.91 m)	180 lb (82 kg)	Jr	Homewood-Flossmoor; Northeaster JC	Glenwood, IL
G	32	Montana Byrd	6 ft 4 in (1.93 m)	225 lb (102 kg)	Jr	Mount Carmel	Chicago, IL
F	33	Jordan Madrid-Andrews	6 ft 8 in (2.03 m)	240 lb (109 kg)	Sr	Bishop Machebeuf; Umpqua CC	Denver, CO
G	35	Brian Greene Jr.	6 ft 3 in (1.91 m)	210 lb (95 kg)	Sr	Thornton; Florida Gulf Coast	Chicago, IL
F	42	Charles Dent	6 ft 6 in (1.98 m)	239 lb (108 kg)	Jr	Chicago Military Academy	Chicago, IL

Head coach

- Tracy Dildy (UIC)

Assistant coach(es)

- James Farr (Creighton)
- Matt Raidbard (Indiana)
- Eddie Denard (Chicago State)

Legend

- (C) Team captain
- (S) Suspended
- (I) Ineligible
- (W) Walk-on
- Injured
- Current redshirt

Roster

== Schedule and results ==
Date time, TV	Rank^{#}	Opponent^{#}	Result	Record	Site (attendance) city, state
Regular season
11/12/2016*; 4:05 pm		Illinois Tech	W 97–89	1–0	Jones Convocation Center (1,065); Chicago, IL
11/17/2016*; 7:00 pm, ESPN3		at No. 9 Wisconsin	L 51–69	1–1	Kohl Center (17,278); Madison, WI
11/19/2016*; 2:00 pm, ESPN3		at Oakland	L 79–107	1–2	Athletics Center O'rena (2,301); Rochester, MI
11/22/2016*; 7:05 pm		East–West	W 103–75	2–2	Jones Convocation Center (550); Chicago, IL
11/26/2016*; 2:00 pm, ACCN Extra		at Notre Dame	L 60–91	2–3	Edmund P. Joyce Center (6,804); South Bend, IN
11/30/2016*; 7:00 pm		at UIC	L 58–74	2–4	UIC Pavilion (3,718); Chicago, IL
12/03/2016*; 2:00 pm		at Western Illinois	W 83–76 ^{OT}	3–4	Western Hall (823); Macomb, IL
12/10/2016*; 8:00 pm		at Bradley	L 48–83	3–5	Carver Arena (823); Peoria, IL
12/11/2016*; 2:00 pm		at Saint Louis	L 43–45	3–6	Chaifetz Arena (4,630); St. Louis, MO
12/14/2016*; 6:00 pm, BTN		at Northwestern	L 64–68	3–7	Welsh-Ryan Arena (5,723); Evanston, IL
12/17/2016*; 1:00 pm, FS1		at DePaul; Las Vegas Classic	L 61–109	3–8	Allstate Arena (4,592); Rosemont, IL
12/19/2016*; 8:35 pm		at Missouri State; Las Vegas Classic	L 46–66	3–9	JQH Arena (3,146); Springfield, MO
12/22/2016*; 2:00 pm		vs. Southeast Missouri State; Las Vegas Classic Visitors' Bracket semifinals	W 74–65	4–9	Orleans Arena; Paradise, NV
12/23/2016*; 4:30 pm		vs. Troy; Las Vegas Classic Visitors' Bracket championship	L 65–83	4–10	Orleans Arena; Paradise, NV
12/28/2016*; 7:00 pm, ESPN3		at Valparaiso	L 61–80	4–11	Athletics–Recreation Center (2,024); Valparaiso, IN
12/30/2016*; 5:30 pm, ESPN3		at Central Michigan	L 82–90	4–12	McGuirk Arena (2,450); Mount Pleasant, MI
01/05/2017; 7:05 pm		Texas–Rio Grande Valley	L 64–83	4–13 (0–1)	Jones Convocation Center (833); Chicago, IL
01/07/2017; 2:05 pm		New Mexico State	L 62–78	4–14 (0–2)	Jones Convocation Center (1,636); Chicago, IL
01/12/2017; 8:00 pm, ESPN3		at Utah Valley	W 70–61	5–14 (1–2)	UCCU Center (1,467); Orem, UT
01/14/2017; 9:00 pm		at Seattle	L 50–65	5–15 (1–3)	KeyArena (1,054); Seattle, WA
01/18/2017*; 7:05 pm		Roosevelt	W 77–57	6–15	Jones Convocation Center (1,015); Chicago, IL
01/21/2017; 7:00 pm		at Texas–Rio Grande Valley	L 77–85 ^{OT}	6–16 (1–4)	UTRGV Fieldhouse (1,308); Edinburg, TX
01/26/2017; 7:05 pm		Cal State Bakersfield	L 59–75	6–17 (1–5)	Jones Convocation Center (1,354); Chicago, IL
01/28/2017; 2:05 pm		Grand Canyon	L 77–85 ^{2OT}	6–18 (1–6)	Jones Convocation Center (1,526); Chicago, IL
02/04/2017; 8:00 pm		at New Mexico State	L 51–86	6–19 (1–7)	Pan American Center (5,445); Las Cruces, NM
02/09/2017; 7:05 pm		Seattle	L 65–90	6–20 (1–8)	Jones Convocation Center (630); Chicago, IL
02/11/2017; 2:05 pm		Utah Valley	L 54–87	6–21 (1–9)	Jones Convocation Center (973); Chicago, IL
02/18/2017; 5:05 pm		at UMKC	L 65–84	6–22 (1–10)	Municipal Auditorium (2,061); Kansas City, MO
02/23/2017; 8:00 pm		at Grand Canyon	L 59–82	6–23 (1–11)	GCU Arena (7,376); Phoenix, AZ
02/25/2017; 9:00 pm		at Cal State Bakersfield	L 49–69	6–24 (1–12)	Icardo Center (3,213); Bakersfield, CA
03/04/2017; 4:35 pm		UMKC	L 82–87	6–25 (1–13)	Jones Convocation Center (884); Chicago, IL
WAC tournament
03/09/2017; 6:30 pm	(7)	vs. (2) New Mexico State; Quarterfinals	L 53–67	6–26	Orleans Arena (1,854); Paradise, NV
*Non-conference game. ^{#}Rankings from AP Poll. (#) Tournament seedings in parentheses. All times are in Central Source.
