= Las Vegas Classic =

Former college basketball tournament

- Sport: College basketball
- Founded: 2011
- Folded: 2021
- No. of teams: 8
- Country: United States
- Venue: Orleans Arena
- Last champion: South Alabama Jaguars (1st title)
- Sponsor: Continental Tire

The Las Vegas Classic was an eight-team college basketball tournament held in December at Orleans Arena in Paradise, Nevada. Each team played four games in the Classic – the first two at on-campus sites and the final two rounds at the Orleans Arena. After being televised by FS1 for years, the tournament went untelevised in 2021, which turned out to be its final year.

== Brackets ==
* – Denotes overtime period

=== 2021 ===
Semifinals; November 25
UIC	80
Hawai'i	88
San Diego	67
South Alabama	68

Championship Game; November 26
Hawai'i	69
South Alabama	72
Consolation Game; November 26
UIC	52
San Diego	64

=== 2018 ===
Third Round; December 22
Drake	66
New Mexico State	63
San Diego	82
Washington State	75

Championship Round; December 23; FS1
Drake	110**
San Diego	103
3rd Place Game
New Mexico State	75
Washington State	72

Third Round; December 22
SIU Edwardsville	79
Cal State Northridge	85
Northern Colorado	67
Rider	74

Championship Round; December 23
Cal State Northridge	81
Rider	80
3rd Place Game
SIU Edwardsville	82
Northern Colorado	72

=== 2017 ===
Four schools: Duquesne, Nevada, San Francisco, and Southern Illinois would play in Las Vegas.

The opening round was played on December 15, 17 and 19 games were played in Orleans Arena. The format for the 2017 tournament was a showcase format.

==== Orleans Arena bracket ====
December 22; FS2		December 22; FS1
		Southern Illinois	64
San Francisco	65	Nevada	86
Duquesne	67

December 23; FS1		December 23; FS1
		San Francisco	66
Southern Illinois	74	Nevada	64
Duquesne	64

==== Visitors Bracket ====
Semifinals; December 22
Lamar	68
UC Davis	77
North Carolina A&T	60
Radford	66

Championship; December 23
UC Davis	62
Radford	72
Consolation; December 23
Lamar	70
North Carolina A&T	74

=== 2016 ===
Third Round; December 22
DePaul	58
Wyoming	72
23	USC	83
Missouri State	75

Championship Round; December 23; Fox Sports 1
Wyoming	92
23	USC	94
3rd Place Game; Fox Sports 1
DePaul	58
Missouri State	69

Third Round; December 22
Chicago State	74
Southeast Missouri State	65
Troy	92
Cornell	84

Championship Round; December 23
Chicago State	65
Troy	83
3rd Place Game
Southeast Missouri State	62
Cornell	78

=== 2015 ===
Third Round; December 22
Kent State	74
18	SMU	90
Colorado	71
Penn State	70

Championship Round; December 23; Fox Sports 1
18	SMU	70
Colorado	66
3rd Place Game; Fox Sports 1
Kent State	69
Penn State	75

Third Round; December 22
Hampton	81
Nicholls State	84
Canisius	108***
Louisiana–Monroe	96

Championship Round; December 23
Nicholls State	74
Canisius	83
3rd Place Game
Hampton	75
Louisiana–Monroe	64

=== 2014 ===
Third Round; December 22
Texas Tech	44
Loyola	62
Boise State	75*
Houston	73

Championship Round; December 23; Fox Sports 1
Loyola	48
Boise State	45
3rd Place Game
Texas Tech	69
Houston	82

Third Round; December 22
Southern Utah	61
Arkansas–Pine Bluff	70
Abilene Christian	65
South Carolina State	59

Championship Round; December 23
Arkansas–Pine Bluff	61
Abilene Christian	69
3rd Place Game
South Carolina State	56
Southern Utah	66

=== 2013 ===
Third Round; December 22
South Florida	66
Mississippi State	71
Santa Clara	71
UNLV	92

Championship Round; December 23; CBSSN
Mississippi State	66
UNLV	82
3rd Place Game
South Florida	65
Santa Clara	66

Third Round; December 22
Florida Gulf Coast	77
Florida A&M	68
Radford	94
Sacred Heart	81

Championship Round; December 23
Radford	64
Florida Gulf Coast	63
3rd Place Game
Sacred Heart	70
Florida A&M	75

=== 2012 ===
Third Round; December 22
Bradley	65
Virginia Tech	66
Portland	59
Colorado State	70

Championship Round; December 23; CBSSN
Virginia Tech	52
Colorado State	88
3rd Place Game
Bradley	55
Portland	57

Third Round; December 22
North Florida	52
Cal State Bakersfield	61
Mississippi Valley State	68
Georgia Southern	81

Championship Round; December 23
North Florida	74
Georgia Southern	46
3rd Place Game
Mississippi Valley State	64
Cal State Bakersfield	69

=== 2011 ===
Third Round; December 22; ESPN3
Missouri State	68
West Virginia	70
Saint Mary's	59
6	Baylor	72

Championship Round; December 23; ESPN2
West Virginia	81
6	Baylor	83
3rd Place Game; ESPN3
Missouri State	61
Saint Mary's	77

Third Round; December 22
Texas A&M–CC	52
Bethune-Cookman	61
Kennesaw State	68
Tennessee Tech	81

Championship Round; December 23
Bethune-Cookman	59
Tennessee Tech	67
3rd Place Game
Texas A&M–CC	55
Kennesaw State	69
