= 2016–17 Utah Valley Wolverines men's basketball team =

American college basketball season

2016–17 Utah Valley Wolverines men's basketball

CBI, Semifinals
- Conference: Western Athletic Conference
- Record: 17–17 (6–8 WAC)
- Head coach: Mark Pope (2nd season)
- Assistant coaches: Cody Fueger; Chris Burgess; Eric Daniels
- Home arena: UCCU Center

2016–17 WAC men's basketball standings
	Conf.				Overall
Team	W		L	PCT	W		L	PCT
Cal State Bakersfield	12	–	2	.857	25	–	10	.714
New Mexico State †	11	–	3	.786	28	–	6	.824
Grand Canyon *	11	–	3	.786	22	–	9	.710
UMKC	8	–	6	.571	18	–	17	.514
Utah Valley	6	–	8	.429	17	–	17	.500
Seattle	5	–	9	.357	13	–	17	.433
Texas–Rio Grande Valley	2	–	12	.143	10	–	22	.313
Chicago State	1	–	13	.071	6	–	26	.188
† 2017 WAC tournament winner * Ineligible for postseason during transition to NCAA Division I.

The 2016–17 Utah Valley Wolverines men's basketball team represented Utah Valley University during the 2016–17 NCAA Division I men's basketball season. The Wolverines were led by second-year head coach Mark Pope and played their home games at the UCCU Center in Orem, Utah, as members of the Western Athletic Conference. They finished the season with a record of 17–17 and a WAC record of 6–8, placing fifth in the conference. In the WAC tournament, they defeated Seattle in the quarterfinals but lost to Cal State Bakersfield in the semifinals. They received an invitation to the College Basketball Invitational, where they defeated Georgia Southern and Rice before losing in the semifinals to Wyoming.

== Previous season ==
The Wolverines finished the 2015–16 season with a record of 12–18. They also went 6–8 in WAC play, resulting in a fifth-place finish. They lost in the quarterfinals of the WAC tournament to UMKC.

== Offseason ==
=== Departures ===
Name	Number	Pos.	Height	Weight	Year	Hometown	Notes
Marcel Davis	0	G	6'2"	180	Senior	American Fork, UT	Graduated
Hayes Garrity	1	G	6'1"	185	RS Junior	Beaverton, OR	Graduate transferred to Idaho State
Jaden Jackson	2	G	6'2"	185	Senior	Salt Lake City, UT	Graduated
Darrious Hamilton	4	F	6'9"	245	Senior	San Antonio, TX	Graduated
Jordan Poydras	10	G	6'3"	185	Senior	Los Angeles, CA	Graduated
Konner Frey	11	G	6'5"	210	Junior	Bountiful, UT	Walk-on; graduate transferred to Montana State
Cory Cardwell	14	G	6'2"	180	Senior	Riverton, UT	Graduated
Josh Pollard	15	G	6'5"	200	Sophomore	Orem, UT	Walk-on; didn't return
Alex Carr	24	G	6'3"	200	Senior	Birmingham, AL	Graduated
Tyler Ott	25	G	6'5"	200	Sophomore	St. George, UT	Walk-on; left the team for personal reasons
Dayon Goodman	33	F	6'7"	220	Sophomore	Salt Lake City, UT	Transferred to Westminster

=== Incoming transfers ===
Name	Number	Pos.	Height	Weight	Year	Hometown	Previous School
Conner Toolson	10	G	6'3"	190	Sophomore	Highland, UT	Junior college transferred from Salt Lake CC
Kenneth Ogbe	25	G	6'6"	194	Senior	Ehingen, Germany	Transferred from Utah. Under NCAA transfer rules, Ogbe will have to sit out for the 2016–17 season. Will have one year of remaining eligibility.
Jake Toolson		G	6'5"	205	Junior	Gilbert, AZ	Transferred from BYU. Under NCAA transfer rules, Toolson will have to sit out for the 2016–17 season. Will have two years of remaining eligibility.

=== Recruiting class of 2016 ===
College recruiting information
Name	Hometown	School	Height	Weight	Commit date
Joonas Tahvanainen; SF	Helsinki, Finland	HBA-Marsky	6 ft 6 in (1.98 m)	220 lb (100 kg)	Aug 19, 2016
Joonas Tahvanainen; SF	Recruit ratings: Scout: Rivals: (NR)				
Jared Stutzman; SG	Idaho Falls, ID	Bonneville High School	6 ft 6 in (1.98 m)	205 lb (93 kg)	
Jared Stutzman; SG	Recruit ratings: Scout: Rivals: (NR)				
Overall recruit ranking:
Note: In many cases, Scout, Rivals, 247Sports, On3, and ESPN may conflict in their listings of height and weight.; In these cases, the average was taken. ESPN grades are on a 100-point scale.; Sources: "2016 Team Ranking". Rivals.

== Roster ==
2016–17 Utah Valley Wolverines men's basketball team
Players
Coaches

Pos.	#	Name	Height	Weight	Year	Previous school	Hometown
G	2	Jake Toolson (redshirt)	6 ft 5 in (1.96 m)	205 lb (93 kg)	So	Highland; BYU	Gilbert, AZ
G	3	Telly Davenport	6 ft 4 in (1.93 m)	195 lb (88 kg)	So	Bonneville	Idaho Falls, ID
G	5	Hayden Scheneck	6 ft 4 in (1.93 m)	195 lb (88 kg)	RS So	Weber; Salt Lake CC	Eden, UT
G	11	Conner Toolson	6 ft 4 in (1.93 m)	185 lb (84 kg)	So	Lone Peak; Salt Lake CC	Highland, UT
F	12	Joonas Tahvanainen	6 ft 6 in (1.98 m)	220 lb (100 kg)	Fr	HBA-Marksy	Helsinki, Finland
G	13	Ivory Young	6 ft 3 in (1.91 m)	185 lb (84 kg)	Sr	Strake Jesuit; Navarro College	Houston, TX
F	21	Zach Nelson	6 ft 7 in (2.01 m)	220 lb (100 kg)	RS Jr	Yuba City	Yuba City, CA
C	22	Isaac Neilson	6 ft 10 in (2.08 m)	245 lb (111 kg)	RS Jr	Mission Viejo; BYU	Mission Viejo, CA
G	23	Brandon Randolph	6 ft 2 in (1.88 m)	190 lb (86 kg)	RS Jr	Inglewood; Xavier	Inglewood, California
G	24	Jared Stutzman	6 ft 6 in (1.98 m)	205 lb (93 kg)	Fr	Bonneville	Idaho Falls, ID
G	25	Kenneth Ogbe (I) (redshirt)	6 ft 6 in (1.98 m)	190 lb (86 kg)	Sr	Urspring Academy; Utah	Ehingen, Germany
C	42	Andrew Bastien	6 ft 9 in (2.06 m)	235 lb (107 kg)	Sr	Orange Lutheran; Irvine Valley College	Tustin, CA

Head coach

- Mark Pope (Kentucky)

Assistant coach(es)

- Cody Fueger (Utah)
- Chris Burgess (Utah)
- Eric Daniels (Johnson & Wales)

Legend

- (C) Team captain
- (S) Suspended
- (I) Ineligible
- (W) Walk-on
- Injured
- Current redshirt

Roster

== Radio broadcasts and streams ==
All Wolverines games will air on KOVO, AKA ESPN 960 Sports. Games will be streamed online through ESPN 960's webpage and at Utah Valley's Stretch Internet feed.

== Schedule and results ==
Date time, TV	Rank^{#}	Opponent^{#}	Result	Record	Site (attendance) city, state
Exhibition
11/07/2016*; 7:00 pm		Western State	W 113–87		UCCU Center (1,123); Orem, UT
Non-conference regular season
11/11/2016*; 8:00 pm, RTNW		at No. 14 Gonzaga	L 69–92	0–1	McCarthey Athletic Center (6,000); Spokane, WA
11/16/2016*; 7:00 pm		Idaho State	W 82–72	1–1	UCCU Center (6,117); Orem, UT
11/19/2016*; 7:00 pm		Benedictine (Mesa); Homecoming	W 86–52	2–1	UCCU Center (1,140); Orem, UT
11/23/2016*; 7:00 pm		at Denver	W 88–85	3–1	Magness Arena (1,377); Denver, CO
11/26/2016*; 7:00 pm, BYUtv		at BYU; Old Oquirrh Bucket	W 114–101	4–1	Marriott Center (16,003); Provo, UT
11/30/2016*; 8:00 pm, P12N		at Washington State	L 76–83	4–2	Beasley Coliseum (2,314); Pullman, WA
12/03/2016*; 7:30 pm		UTSA	W 75–71	5–2	UCCU Center (1,676); Orem, UT
12/06/2016*; 6:00 pm, P12N		at Utah; Old Oquirrh Bucket	L 80–87	5–3	Jon M. Huntsman Center (12,457); Salt Lake City, UT
12/10/2016*; 7:00 pm		Utah State; Old Oquirrh Bucket	L 79–80 ^{OT}	5–4	UCCU Center (6,792); Orem, UT
12/17/2016*; 7:00 pm, KJZZ		at Weber State; Old Oquirrh Bucket	L 85–93	5–5	Dee Events Center (8,212); Ogden, UT
12/21/2016*; 7:30 pm		at UTSA	L 60–66	5–6	Covocation Center (753); San Antonio, TX
12/23/2017*; 7:00 pm		Montana Tech	W 72–47	6–6	UCCU Center (1,014); Orem, UT
12/28/2016*; 8:00 pm		at UC Riverside	W 73–64	7–6	The SRC (495); Riverside, CA
12/31/2016*; 3:00 pm		at UC Davis	L 69–83	7–7	The Pavilion (787); Davis, CA
01/02/2017*; 7:00 pm		Antelope Valley	W 102–62	8–7	UCCU Center (609); Orem, UT
WAC regular season
01/07/2017; 7:00 pm		at Grand Canyon	L 72–82	8–8 (0–1)	GCU Arena (6,933); Phoenix, AZ
01/12/2017; 7:00 pm, ESPN3		Chicago State	L 61–70	8–9 (0–2)	UCCU Center (1,467); Orem, UT
01/14/2017; 7:00 pm		UMKC	W 86–76	9–9 (1–2)	UCCU Center (1,823); Orem, UT
01/21/2017; 8:00 pm, ASN		at Cal State Bakersfield	L 65–68	9–10 (1–3)	Icardo Center (3,497); Bakersfield, CA
01/26/2017; 7:00 pm		Texas–Rio Grande Valley	W 92–81	10–10 (2–3)	UCCU Center (1,347); Orem, UT
01/28/2017; 7:00 pm		New Mexico State	L 69–74	10–11 (2–4)	UCCU Center (6,246); Orem, UT
02/04/2017; 8:00 pm, ASN		at Seattle	L 50–63	10–12 (2–5)	KeyArena (2,104); Seattle, WA
02/09/2017; 7:00 pm		at UMKC	L 76–84	10–13 (2–6)	Municipal Auditorium (1,277); Kansas City, MO
02/11/2017; 1:05 pm		at Chicago State	W 87–54	11–13 (3–6)	Jones Convention Center (973); Chicago, IL
02/16/2017; 7:00 pm		Cal State Bakersfield	L 71–80	11–14 (3–7)	UCCU Center (1,255); Orem, UT
02/18/2017; 7:00 pm		Grand Canyon	L 71–77	11–15 (3–8)	UCCU Center (3,265); Orem, UT
02/23/2017; 7:00 pm		at New Mexico State	W 84–72	12–15 (4–8)	Pan American Center (4,151); Las Cruces, NM
02/25/2017; 6:00 pm		at Texas–Rio Grande Valley	W 88–68	13–15 (5–8)	UTRGV Fieldhouse (1,465); Edinburg, TX
03/04/2017; 7:00 pm		Seattle	W 61–54	14–15 (6–8)	UCCU Center (5,467); Orem, UT
WAC tournament
03/09/2017; 3:00 pm	(4)	vs. (5) Seattle; Quarterfinals	W 65–53	15–15	Orleans Arena (1,854); Paradise, NV
03/10/2017; 7:00 pm, ESPN3	(4)	vs. (1) Cal State Bakersfield; Semifinals	L 80–81 ^{4OT}	15–16	Orleans Arena (2,190); Paradise, NV
CBI
03/15/2017*; 5:00 pm		at Georgia Southern; First Round	W 74–49	16–16	Hanner Fieldhouse (603); Statesboro, GA
03/20/2017*; 6:00 pm		at Rice; Quarterfinals	W 85–79	17–16	Tudor Fieldhouse (1,584); Houston, TX
03/22/2017*; 7:00 pm		at Wyoming; Semifinals	L 68–74	17–17	Arena-Auditorium (2,577); Laramie, WY
*Non-conference game. ^{#}Rankings from AP Poll. (#) Tournament seedings in parentheses. All times are in Mountain Time Source.
