= 2016–17 Texas–Rio Grande Valley Vaqueros men's basketball team =

American college basketball season

2016–17 Texas–Rio Grande Valley Vaqueros men's basketball
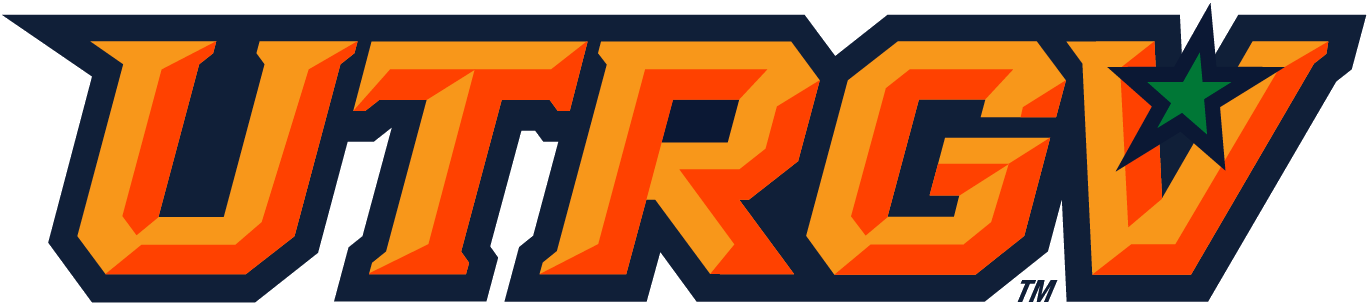

Emerald Coast Classic Pool B champions
- Conference: Western Athletic Conference
- Record: 10–22 (2–12 WAC)
- Head coach: Lew Hill (1st season)
- Assistant coaches: Jai Steadman; Kenya Crandell; Luke Mackay
- Home arena: UTRGV Fieldhouse

2016–17 WAC men's basketball standings
	Conf.				Overall
Team	W		L	PCT	W		L	PCT
Cal State Bakersfield	12	–	2	.857	25	–	10	.714
New Mexico State †	11	–	3	.786	28	–	6	.824
Grand Canyon *	11	–	3	.786	22	–	9	.710
UMKC	8	–	6	.571	18	–	17	.514
Utah Valley	6	–	8	.429	17	–	17	.500
Seattle	5	–	9	.357	13	–	17	.433
Texas–Rio Grande Valley	2	–	12	.143	10	–	22	.313
Chicago State	1	–	13	.071	6	–	26	.188
† 2017 WAC tournament winner * Ineligible for postseason during transition to NCAA Division I.

The 2016–17 Texas–Rio Grande Valley Vaqueros men's basketball team represented the University of Texas Rio Grande Valley during the 2016–17 NCAA Division I men's basketball season. The Vaqueros, led by first-year head coach Lew Hill, played their home games at the UTRGV Fieldhouse as members of the Western Athletic Conference. They finished the regular season 10–22, 2–12 in WAC play to finish in seventh place. Due to Grand Canyon's ineligibility for postseason play, they received the No. 6 seed in the WAC tournament where they lost in the quarterfinals to UMKC.

== Previous season ==
The Vaqueros finished the 2015–16 season 8–22, 4–10 in WAC play to finish in a tie for sixth place. They lost in the quarterfinals of the WAC tournament to Seattle.

On March 15, 2016, the school removed Dan Hipsher as head coach. On March 31, the school hired Lew Hill as head coach.

== Offseason ==
=== Departures ===
Name	Number	Pos.	Height	Weight	Year	Hometown	Notes
Everett Osborne	0	G	6'4"	190	RS Senior	Los Angeles, CA	Graduated
Mike Lopez	2	G	6'1"	185	Sophomore	Abilene, TX	Walk-on; left the team for personal reasons
J. J. Thompson	3	G	6'0"	190	RS Senior	Irving, TX	Graduated
Shaquille Hines	24	F	6'7"	215	Senior	Chicago, IL	Graduated
Joaquin Pistokache	30	G	6'2"	175	RS Junior	Mission, TX	Walk-on; left the team for personal reasons
Ot Elmore	33	G	6'2"	175	RS Sophomore	Charleston, WV	Transferred to Marshall
Dakota Slaughter	35	F	6'7"	222	RS Senior	Fishers, IN	Graduated
Christopher Ikuenobe	44	F	6'9"	240	RS Junior	Warri, Nigeria	Graduate transferred to Rogers State

=== Incoming transfers ===
Name	Number	Pos.	Height	Weight	Year	Hometown	Previous School
Michael Nwabuzor	0	G	6'2"	190	Junior	Lakewood, CA	Junior college transferred from Central Arizona College.
Gage Loy	35	F	6'9"	210	Junior	Wichita, KS	Junior college transferred from Garden City CC

== 2016 incoming recruits ==
College recruiting information
Name	Hometown	School	Height	Weight	Commit date
D. J. Johnson; SF	McAllen, TX	McAllen Memorial High School	6 ft 6 in (1.98 m)	195 lb (88 kg)	
D. J. Johnson; SF	Recruit ratings: Scout: Rivals: (NR)				
Anthony Thomas Jr. SF	Dallas, TX	Justin F. Kimball High School	6 ft 6 in (1.98 m)	195 lb (88 kg)	
Anthony Thomas Jr. SF	Recruit ratings: Scout: Rivals: (NR)				
Bryce Cheney; SF	Phoenix, AZ	Moon Valley High School	6 ft 7 in (2.01 m)	200 lb (91 kg)	
Bryce Cheney; SF	Recruit ratings: Scout: Rivals: (NR)				
Overall recruit ranking:
Note: In many cases, Scout, Rivals, 247Sports, On3, and ESPN may conflict in their listings of height and weight.; In these cases, the average was taken. ESPN grades are on a 100-point scale.; Sources: "2016 Team Ranking". Rivals.

== Roster ==
2016–17 Texas–Rio Grande Valley Vaqueros men's basketball team
Players
Coaches

Pos.	#	Name	Height	Weight	Year	Previous school	Hometown
G	0	Mike Nwabuzor	6 ft 2 in (1.88 m)	190 lb (86 kg)	Jr	Mayfair; Central Arizona College	Bellflower, CA
G	2	Solomon Yon (W)	6 ft 0 in (1.83 m)	175 lb (79 kg)	RS So	Cherokee Trail; Napa Valley College	Denver, CO
G	4	Nick Dixon	6 ft 2 in (1.88 m)	175 lb (79 kg)	RS Jr	Proviso West; Morton College	Hillside, IL
G	5	Walter Jones	6 ft 4 in (1.93 m)	200 lb (91 kg)	So	Sunshine	Newbern, AL
F	11	Lesley Varner II	6 ft 7 in (2.01 m)	185 lb (84 kg)	Fr	Cedar Hill	Dallas, TX
G	12	Nick Mora (W)	6 ft 0 in (1.83 m)	157 lb (71 kg)	Fr	Weslaco	Weslaco, TX
G	13	Lew Stallworth	6 ft 1 in (1.85 m)	187 lb (85 kg)	RS So	William S. Hart; UTEP	Santa Clarita, CA
F	15	Adrean Johnson	6 ft 9 in (2.06 m)	235 lb (107 kg)	Fr	Red Oak	Red Oak, TX
G	20	Moe McDonald	6 ft 4 in (1.93 m)	175 lb (79 kg)	RS Jr	IMG Academy; Highland CC	McAllen, TX
F	21	Mike Hoffman	6 ft 9 in (2.06 m)	215 lb (98 kg)	RS Jr	Nolan Catholic; Lafayette	Burleson, TX
F	23	Dan Kimasa	6 ft 10 in (2.08 m)	230 lb (104 kg)	So	Tampa Bay Christian Academy	Kigali City, Rwanda
G	25	Xavier McDaniel	6 ft 6 in (1.98 m)	170 lb (77 kg)	Fr	Hammond	Columbia, SC
G	30	Clarke Cooper (W)	6 ft 0 in (1.83 m)	155 lb (70 kg)	Fr	Westside	Houston, TX
F	32	Adonis Rwabigwi	6 ft 8 in (2.03 m)	220 lb (100 kg)	RS Jr	Tampa Prep; Furman	Kigali City, Rwanda
G	33	Onuralp Demirer (W)	6 ft 2 in (1.88 m)	177 lb (80 kg)	Fr	Istek Vakfi Bilge Kagan	Istanbul, Turkey
F	35	Gage Loy	6 ft 9 in (2.06 m)	210 lb (95 kg)	Jr	Wichita North; Garden City CC	Wichita, KS
G	55	Antonio Green	6 ft 2 in (1.88 m)	165 lb (75 kg)	So	Tupelo	Tupelo, MS

Head coach

- Lew Hill (Wichita State)

Assistant coach(es)

- Jai Steadman (Nebraska)
- Kenya Crandell (Nebraska–Kearney)
- Luke Mackay (East Carolina)

Legend

- (C) Team captain
- (S) Suspended
- (I) Ineligible
- (W) Walk-on
- Injured
- Current redshirt

Roster

== Schedule and results ==
Date time, TV	Rank^{#}	Opponent^{#}	Result	Record	Site (attendance) city, state
Exhibition
11/04/2016*; 7:00 pm		UT Tyler	W 101–75		UTRGV Fieldhouse; Edinburg, TX
Non-conference regular season
11/13/2016*; 7:00 pm		at UT Martin	L 80–88	0–1	Skyhawk Arena (1,094); Martin, TN
11/14/2016*; 7:00 pm, ESPN3		at Memphis; Emerald Coast Classic	L 75–94	0–2	FedEx Forum (9,217); Memphis, TN
11/16/2016*; 7:00 pm		Texas A&M–Corpus Christi; South Texas Showdown	L 72–94	0–3	UTRGV Fieldhouse (2,002); Edinburg, TX
11/20/2016*; 4:00 pm, BTN+		at Iowa; Emerald Coast Classic	L 67–95	0–4	Carver–Hawkeye Arena (11,596); Iowa City, IA
11/22/2016*; 7:00 pm		at Southeast Missouri State	L 72–83	0–5	Show Me Center (1,139); Cape Girardeau, MO
11/25/2016*; 12:30 pm		vs. Grambling State; Emerald Coast Classic Pool B semifinals	W 101–93	1–5	The Arena at NWFSC (380); Niceville, FL
11/25/2016*; 11:30 am		vs. St. Francis Brooklyn; Emerald Coast Classic Pool B championship	W 71–61	2–5	The Arena at NWFSC (200); Niceville, FL
11/29/2016*; 7:00 pm		at Texas A&M–Corpus Christi; South Texas Showdown	L 68–84	2–6	American Bank Center (2,003); Corpus Christi, TX
12/03/2016*; 6:05 pm		at Portland State	L 74–87	2–7	Peter Stott Center (408); Portland, OR
12/05/2016*; 9:00 pm		at Portland	L 89–90 ^{2OT}	2–8	Chiles Center (1,562); Portland, OR
12/07/2016*; 7:00 pm, SPCSN		Texas State	W 72–61	3–8	UTRGV Fieldhouse (1,126); Edinburg, TX
12/12/2016*; 7:00 pm, SPCSN		North Florida	W 98–84	4–8	UTRGV Fieldhouse (724); Edinburg, TX
12/16/2016*; 7:00 pm, SPCSN		Lamar	W 95–81	5–8	UTRGV Fieldhouse (835); Edinburg, TX
12/17/2016*; 7:00 pm, ESPN3		at Houston	L 58–83	5–9	Hofheinz Pavilion (2,856); Houston, TX
12/21/2016*; 7:00 pm, SPCSN		Wayland Baptist	W 86–55	6–9	UTRGV Fieldhouse (807); Edinburg, TX
12/29/2016*; 7:00 pm, SPCSN		Our Lady of the Lake	W 97–81	7–9	UTRGV Fieldhouse (1,028); Edinburg, TX
12/31/2016*; 2:00 pm, SPCSN		Texas A&M–Kingsville	W 96–78	8–9	UTRGV Fieldhouse (844); Edinburg, TX
WAC regular season
01/05/2017; 7:00 pm		at Chicago State	W 83–64	9–9 (1–0)	Jones Convocation Center (833); Chicago, IL
01/07/2017; 7:00 pm		at UMKC	L 79–83	9–10 (1–1)	Municipal Auditorium (1,539); Kansas City, MO
01/12/2017; 7:00 pm, SPCSN		Cal State Bakersfield	L 81–88	9–11 (1–2)	UTRGV Fieldhouse (1,330); Edinburg, TX
01/14/2017; 7:00 pm, ASN		Grand Canyon	L 66–79	9–12 (1–3)	UTRGV Fieldhouse (1,614); Edinburg, TX
01/21/2017; 7:00 pm, SPCSN		Chicago State	W 85–77 ^{OT}	10–12 (2–3)	UTRGV Fieldhouse (1,308); Edinburg, TX
01/26/2017; 8:00 pm		at Utah Valley	L 81–92	10–13 (2–4)	UCCU Center (1,347); Orem, UT
01/28/2017; 9:00 pm		at Seattle	L 84–96	10–14 (2–5)	KeyArena (1,561); Seattle, WA
02/04/2017; 7:00 pm, SPCSN		UMKC	L 60–73	10–15 (2–6)	UTRGV Fieldhouse (1,610); Edinburg, TX
02/09/2017; 8:00 pm		at Grand Canyon	L 57–76	10–16 (2–7)	GCU Arena (5,897); Phoenix, AZ
02/11/2017; 9:00 pm		at Cal State Bakersfield	L 53–75	10–17 (2–8)	Icardo Center (2,312); Bakersfield, CA
02/18/2017; 7:00 pm, SPCSN Alt.		New Mexico State	L 101–107	10–18 (2–9)	UTRGV Fieldhouse (2,234); Edinburg, TX
02/23/2017; 7:00 pm, SPCSN Alt.		Seattle	L 77–86	10–19 (2–10)	UTRGV Fieldhouse (1,325); Edinburg, TX
02/25/2017; 7:00 pm, SPCSN Alt.		Utah Valley	L 68–88	10–20 (2–11)	UTRGV Fieldhouse (1,465); Edinburg, TX
03/04/2017; 8:00 pm, AggieVision		at New Mexico State	L 81–107	10–21 (2–12)	Pan American Center (5,233); Las Cruces, NM
WAC tournament
03/09/2017; 9:00 pm	(6)	vs. (3) UMKC; Quarterfinals	L 78–82 ^{OT}	10–22	Orleans Arena (1,854); Paradise, NV
*Non-conference game. ^{#}Rankings from AP Poll. (#) Tournament seedings in parentheses. All times are in Central Source.

== See also ==
- 2016–17 Texas–Rio Grande Valley Vaqueros women's basketball team
