= 2016–17 UMKC Kangaroos men's basketball team =

American college basketball season

2016–17 UMKC Kangaroos men's basketball
- Conference: Western Athletic Conference
- Record: 18–17 (8–6 WAC)
- Head coach: Kareem Richardson (4th season)
- Associate head coach: Angres Thorpe (4th season)
- Assistant coaches: Chris Hollender (2nd season); Conner Hampton (1st season)
- Home arena: Municipal Auditorium, Swinney Recreation Center

2016–17 WAC men's basketball standings
	Conf.				Overall
Team	W		L	PCT	W		L	PCT
Cal State Bakersfield	12	–	2	.857	25	–	10	.714
New Mexico State †	11	–	3	.786	28	–	6	.824
Grand Canyon *	11	–	3	.786	22	–	9	.710
UMKC	8	–	6	.571	18	–	17	.514
Utah Valley	6	–	8	.429	17	–	17	.500
Seattle	5	–	9	.357	13	–	17	.433
Texas–Rio Grande Valley	2	–	12	.143	10	–	22	.313
Chicago State	1	–	13	.071	6	–	26	.188
† 2017 WAC tournament winner * Ineligible for postseason during transition to NCAA Division I.

The 2016–17 UMKC Kangaroos men's basketball team represented the University of Missouri–Kansas City during the 2016–17 NCAA Division I men's basketball season. The Kangaroos, led by fourth year head coach Kareem Richardson, played most of their home games off-campus at Municipal Auditorium (with one postseason game on-campus at Swinney Recreation Center) in Kansas City, Missouri as a member of the Western Athletic Conference (WAC).

The Kangaroos finished the season 18–17, 8–6 in WAC play to finish in fourth place. They were victorious over the University of Texas Rio Grande Valley in the WAC tournament quarterfinal round but were defeated by New Mexico State University in the semifinal round.

The Kangaroos accepted an invitation to the College Basketball Invitational (CBI) where they were victorious over the University of Wisconsin–Green Bay in the first round but were defeated by the University of Wyoming in the quarterfinal round.

== Previous season ==
The Kangaroos finished the 2015–16 season with a record of 12–19 overall, 4–10 in conference to finish in a tie for sixth place.

== Offseason ==
=== Departures ===
Pos.	#	Name	Height	Weight	Year	Hometown	Notes
F	22	Shayok Shayok	6'9"	225	RS Sr	Ottawa, ON	Graduated
C	21	Thaddeus Smith	6'9"	245	Sr	Washington, D. C.	Graduated
F	2	Ikem Eriobuna	6'9"	220	Jr	Lagos, Nigeria	Graduated, Allen
G/F	23	Darius Austin	6'9"	220	So	Centreveille, IL	Jackson State
G	42	Noah Knight	6'1"	200	So	Olathe, KS	Injury
G	10	Wayatt Voorhes	6'1"	185	So	Shawnee, KS	Personal

=== Incoming transfers ===
Pos.	#	Name	Height	Weight	Year	Previous School	Hometown
G	15	Robert Knar	6'1"	180	RS Jr	Northern Iowa	Mundelein, IL
G	10	Broderick Robinson	6'0"	170	Jr	Northwest Kansas Technical	Grand Junction, CO

=== 2016 incoming recruits ===
College recruiting information
Name	Hometown	School	Height	Weight	Commit date
Xavier Bishop; PG	Springfield, IL	Lanphier HS	5 ft 8 in (1.73 m)	150 lb (68 kg)	Feb 25, 2016
Xavier Bishop; PG	Recruit ratings: Scout: Rivals: 247Sports: (NR)				
Duane Clark; PF	St. Louis, MO	Christian Brothers College HS	6 ft 8 in (2.03 m)	245 lb (111 kg)	Sep 27, 2015
Duane Clark; PF	Recruit ratings: Scout: Rivals: 247Sports: (NR)				
Jordan Giles; PF	Tuscaloosa, AL	Tennessee Christian Preparatory	6 ft 6 in (1.98 m)	220 lb (100 kg)	
Jordan Giles; PF	Recruit ratings: Scout: Rivals: 247Sports: (NR)				
Daniel Hailey; SF	Stanberry, MO	Stanberry HS	6 ft 5 in (1.96 m)	200 lb (91 kg)	
Daniel Hailey; SF	Recruit ratings: Scout: Rivals: 247Sports: (NR)				
Isaiah Ross; SG	Davenport, IA	Hillcrest	6 ft 4 in (1.93 m)	200 lb (91 kg)	
Isaiah Ross; SG	Recruit ratings: Scout: Rivals: 247Sports: (NR)				
Overall recruit ranking:
Note: In many cases, Scout, Rivals, 247Sports, On3, and ESPN may conflict in their listings of height and weight.; In these cases, the average was taken. ESPN grades are on a 100-point scale.; Sources: "2016 Team Ranking". Rivals.

== Roster ==
2016–17 UMKC Kangaroos men's basketball team
Players
Coaches

Pos.	#	Name	Height	Weight	Year	Previous school	Hometown
G/F	25	Broderick Newbill	6 ft 5 in (1.96 m)	190 lb (86 kg)	RS Sr	Fresno State; Hogan Preparatory	Kansas City, MO
G/F	4	LaVell Boyd	6 ft 0 in (1.83 m)	175 lb (79 kg)	Sr	South Suburban; Farragut Career	Chicago, IL
G	12	Martez Harrison	5 ft 11 in (1.8 m)	200 lb (91 kg)	Sr	Brewster / University	Kansas City, MO
G/F	1	Dashawn King	6 ft 3 in (1.91 m)	195 lb (88 kg)	Sr	Erie CC; Scholarship and Entrepreneurship	Bronx, NY
F	3	Kyle Steward	6 ft 7 in (2.01 m)	195 lb (88 kg)	Sr	Butler CC/ Youngstown State; Cass Technical HS	Detroit, MI
C	54	Darnell Tillman	6 ft 8 in (2.03 m)	265 lb (120 kg)	Sr	Florida State–Jacksonville/ Southern Idaho; University City HS	St. Louis, MO
G	15	Robert Knar (I)	6 ft 1 in (1.85 m)	180 lb (82 kg)	RS Jr	Northern Iowa; Mundelein HS	Mundelein, IL
G	10	Broderick Robinson	6 ft 1 in (1.85 m)	175 lb (79 kg)	Jr	Northwest Kansas Technical; Grand Junction HS	Grand Junction, CO
G	11	Grant Leach	6 ft 3 in (1.91 m)	190 lb (86 kg)	So	Air Force Preparatory/ Hamilton Southeastern HS	Fishers, IN
F/C	30	Aleer Leek	6 ft 9 in (2.06 m)	220 lb (100 kg)	So	Victory Rock Prep/ IMG Academy	Juba, South Sudan
G	32	Broderick Ross	6 ft 1 in (1.85 m)	175 lb (79 kg)	So	Southern Illinois Edwardsville; Trinity Catholic HS	St. Louis, MO
G	0	Xavier Bishop	5 ft 8 in (1.73 m)	150 lb (68 kg)	Fr	Lanphier HS	Springfield, IL
F	22	Duane Clark	6 ft 8 in (2.03 m)	245 lb (111 kg)	Fr	Christian Brothers College HS	St. Louis, MO
F	5	Jordan Giles	6 ft 7 in (2.01 m)	220 lb (100 kg)	Fr	Tennessee Christian Preparatory/ Holy Spirit Catholic	Tuscaloosa, AL
G/F	42	Daniel Hailey (W)	6 ft 5 in (1.96 m)	200 lb (91 kg)	Fr	Stanberry HS	Stanberry, MO
G	2	Isaiah Ross	6 ft 4 in (1.93 m)	200 lb (91 kg)	Fr	Hillcrest/ Davenport West HS	Davenport, IA

Head coach

- Kareem Richardson (Evansville)

Assistant coach(es)

- Angres Thorpe (Saint Leo)
- Chris Hollender (Evansville)
- Conner Hampton (Tabor)

Legend

- (C) Team captain
- (S) Suspended
- (I) Ineligible
- (W) Walk-on
- (5Y) Fifth-year Senior
- Injured
- Current redshirt

Roster
Last update: November 3, 2024

== Schedule & Results ==
Date time, TV	Rank^{#}	Opponent^{#}	Result	Record	High points	High rebounds	High assists	Site (attendance) city, state
Exhibition Season
November 5, 2016*; 4:05 PM		Missouri S&T	W 79–55		14 – Harrison	7 – Giles	5 – Bishop	Municipal Auditorium; Kansas City, MO
Regular Season
November 11, 2016*; 8:00 PM, FS2		at No. 22 Creighton	L 82–89	0–1	17 – Harrison	7 – Steward, Tillman	4 – Boyd, Harrison	CenturyLink Center (16,686); Omaha, NE
November 15, 2016*; 6:35 PM		Drake	W 68–62	1–1	22 – Harrison	6 – Steward	3 – Harrison, Robinson	Municipal Auditorium (1,535); Kansas City, MO
November 19, 2016*; 3:00 PM, ESPN3		at Bowling Green; Bill Frack Tournament [Round–Robin]	W 71–69	2–1	23 – Harrison	8 – Tillman	4 – Harrison	Stroh Center (1,676); Bowling Green, OH
November 20, 2016*; 3:00 PM		vs. Murray State; Bill Frack Tournament [Round–Robin]	W 85–74	3–1	21 – Boyd	5 – Boyd, Robinson, Leek	4 – Boyd, Harrison	Stroh Center (1,514); Bowling Green, OH
November 21, 2016*; 3:00 PM		vs. Green Bay; Bill Frack Tournament [Round–Robin]	L 77–95	3–2	23 – Boyd	6 – Boyd	5 – Harrison	Stroh Center (1,545); Bowling Green, OH
November 25, 2016*; 7:35 PM		Arkansas–Monticello	W 97–82	4–2	21 – Boyd	4 – Newbill, Tillman	4 – Boyd, Harrison	Municipal Auditorium (1,045); Kansas City, MO
November 28, 2016*; 6:35 PM		Southeast Missouri State	W 86–75	5–2	24 – Boyd	6 – Steward	4 – Boyd	Municipal Auditorium (976); Kansas City, MO
November 30, 2016*; 6:35 PM		South Dakota	W 84–82	6–2	19 – Boyd	5 – Steward	8 – Boyd	Municipal Auditorium (1,230); Kansas City, MO
December 3, 2016*; 11:00 AM, KSMO–TV		at South Dakota State	L 68–77	6–3	19 – Boyd	9 – Tillman	6 – Boyd	Frost Arena (1,424); Brookings, SD
December 6, 2016*; 7:00 PM, ESPN3		at No. 3 Kansas	L 62–105	6–4	17 – Boyd	5 – Tillman	2 – Boyd, Tillman, Robinson	Allen Fieldhouse (16,300); Lawrence, KS
December 10, 2016*; 4:05 PM		William Jewell	W 93–71	7–4	21 – Boyd	4 – Steward	6 – Boyd	Municipal Auditorium (1,769); Kansas City, MO
December 15, 2016*; 6:35 PM, KSMO–TV		Omaha	L 75–80	7–5	27 – Boyd	6 – Newbill	6 – Boyd	Municipal Auditorium (1,216); Kansas City, MO
December 17, 2016*; 1:00 PM, RTPT		at No. 12 West Virginia	L 67–112	7–6	14 – Boyd	8 – Tillman	4 – Bishop	WVU Coliseum (8,800); Morgantown, WV
December 20, 2016*; 7:35 PM		UT Martin	L 66–77	7–7	32 – Boyd	9 – Tillman	3 – Steward, Robinson	Municipal Auditorium (1,048); Kansas City, MO
December 29, 2016*; 7:00 PM		at Mississippi State	L 54–77	7–8	15 – Steward	8 – Tillman	2 – Ross	Humphrey Coliseum (7,109); Starkville, MS
January 2, 2017*; 6:35 PM		USC Upstate	L 75–84	7–9	16 – Boyd	6 – Tillman	3 – Boyd	Municipal Auditorium (1,170); Kansas City, MO
January 5, 2017; 6:05 PM		New Mexico State	L 64–77	7–10 (0–1)	15 – Boyd	12 – Steward	2 – Steward	Municipal Auditorium (1,024); Kansas City, MO
January 7, 2017; 7:05 PM		UT Rio Grande Valley	W 83–79	8–10 (1–1)	17 – Boyd, Ross	9 – Boyd	6 – Boyd	Municipal Auditorium (1,539); Kansas City, MO
January 12, 2017; 9:00 PM		at Seattle	W 84–68	9–10 (2–1)	21 – Steward	9 – Steward	4 – Boyd	KeyArena (1,031); Seattle, WA
January 14, 2017; 8:00 PM, KSMO–TV		at Utah Valley	L 76–86	9–11 (2–2)	22 – Boyd	6 – Tillman, Robinson	3 – Newbill, Bishop	UCCU Center (1,823); Orem, UT
January 21, 2017; 8:00 PM, KSMO–TV		at New Mexico State	L 71–94	9–12 (2–3)	18 – Boyd	7 – Steward	3 – Boyd	Pan American Center (9,893); Las Cruces, NM
January 26, 2017; 6:05 PM		Grand Canyon	W 83–77	10–12 (3–3)	24 – Boyd	7 – Steward	6 – Boyd	Municipal Auditorium (1,178); Kansas City, MO
January 28, 2017; 7:05 PM		CSU Bakersfield	L 63–74	10–13 (3–4)	14 – Steward	6 – Robinson	4 – Bishop	Municipal Auditorium (1,587); Kansas City, MO
January 31, 2017*; 6:35 PM		Ottawa (Kansas)	W 93–67	11–13	20 – Newbill, Steward	7 – Giles	9 – Bishop	Municipal Auditorium (1,123); Kansas City, MO
February 4, 2017; 7:00 PM, KSMO–TV		at UT Rio Grande Valley	W 73–60	12–13 (4–4)	20 – Steward	14 – Steward	6 – Boyd	UTRGV Fieldhouse (1,610); Edinburg, TX
February 9, 2017; 6:35 PM		Utah Valley	W 84–76	13–13 (5–4)	20 – Steward	11 – Steward	5 – Boyd, Bishop	Municipal Auditorium (1,277); Kansas City, MO
February 11, 2017; 7:05 PM		Seattle	W 102–72	14–13 (6–4)	20 – Steward	7 – Steward, Robinson	4 – Boyd	Municipal Auditorium (1,788); Kansas City, MO
February 18, 2017; 5:05 PM		Chicago State	W 84–65	15–13 (7–4)	19 – Steward	7 – Steward	6 – Boyd	Municipal Auditorium (2,061); Kansas City, MO
February 23, 2017; 9:00 PM		at CSU Bakersfield	L 62–71	15–14 (7–5)	16 – King	6 – Tillman	7 – Boyd	Jimmie and Marjorie; Icardo Center (2,233); Bakersfield, CA
February 25, 2017; 8:00 PM, KSMO–TV		at Grand Canyon	L 77–84	15–15 (7–6)	22 – Boyd	6 – Newbill, King	7 – Boyd	GCU Arena (7,502); Phoenix, AZ
March 4, 2017; 4:35 PM, KSMO–TV		at Chicago State	W 87–82	16–15 (8–6)	25 – Boyd	8 – Tillman	4 – Boyd	Emil and Patricia; Jones Convocation Center (884); Chicago, IL
Conference Tournament
March 9, 2017*; 9:00 PM	(3)	vs. (6) Texas–Rio Grande Valley [Quarterfinal]	W 82–78 ^{OT}	17–15	22 – Boyd	12 – Steward	2 – Boyd, Steward, Tillman	Orleans Arena (1,854); Paradise, NV
March 10, 2017*; 10:30 PM, ESPN3	(3)	vs. (2) New Mexico State [Semifinal]	L 60–78	17–16	12 – King, Steward	8 – Tillman	4 – Boyd	Orleans Arena (2,190); Paradise, NV
College Basketball Invitational Presented by FIVE FOUR
March 15, 2017*; 7:05 PM		Green Bay [First Round]	W 92–82	18–16	28 – Boyd	7 – Boyd, Tillman	7 – Boyd	Swinney Recreation Center (1,128); Kansas City, MO
March 20, 2017*; 8:00 PM		at Wyoming [Quarterfinal]	L 61–72	18–17	16 – King	12 – Tillman	3 – Boyd	Arena–Auditorium (2,311); Laramie, WY
*Non-conference game. ^{#}Rankings from AP Poll. (#) Tournament seedings in parentheses. All times are in Central Standard Time (CST).
