= 2016–17 Grand Canyon Antelopes men's basketball team =

American college basketball season

2016–17 Grand Canyon Antelopes men's basketball
- Conference: Western Athletic Conference
- Record: 22–9 (11–3 WAC)
- Head coach: Dan Majerle (4th season)
- Assistant coaches: Todd Lee; Chris Crevelone; T. J. Benson
- Home arena: GCU Arena

2016–17 WAC men's basketball standings
	Conf.				Overall
Team	W		L	PCT	W		L	PCT
Cal State Bakersfield	12	–	2	.857	25	–	10	.714
New Mexico State †	11	–	3	.786	28	–	6	.824
Grand Canyon *	11	–	3	.786	22	–	9	.710
UMKC	8	–	6	.571	18	–	17	.514
Utah Valley	6	–	8	.429	17	–	17	.500
Seattle	5	–	9	.357	13	–	17	.433
Texas–Rio Grande Valley	2	–	12	.143	10	–	22	.313
Chicago State	1	–	13	.071	6	–	26	.188
† 2017 WAC tournament winner * Ineligible for postseason during transition to NCAA Division I.

The 2016–17 Grand Canyon Antelopes men's basketball team represented Grand Canyon University during the 2016–17 NCAA Division I men's basketball season. They were led by head coach Dan Majerle in his fourth season at Grand Canyon. The Antelopes played their home games at the GCU Arena in Phoenix, Arizona as members of the Western Athletic Conference.

The season was their fourth and final year of a four-year transition period from Division II to Division I. As a result, the Antelopes were not eligible for the NCAA postseason play and could not participate in the WAC tournament. They could have played in the CIT or CBI had they been invited.

They finished the season 22–9, 11–3 in WAC play to finish in a tie for second place. Citing injuries, they decided to not participate in a postseason tournament. They had participated in the CIT the previous three seasons.

== Previous season ==
The Antelopes finished the 2015–16 season 27–7, 11–3 in WAC play to finish in a tie for second place. They were invited to the CollegeInsider.com Tournament and defeated South Carolina State and Jackson State to advance to the quarterfinals where they lost to Coastal Carolina.

== Departures ==
Name	Number	Pos.	Height	Weight	Year	Hometown	Notes
Grandy Glaze	1	F	6'6"	235	RS Senior	Toronto, ON	Graduated
Grant White	3	G	6'1"	175	Senior	Monroeville, AL	Graduated
Ryan Majerle	4	G	6'3"	190	RS Senior	Rockford, MN	Graduated
Dominic Magee	10	G	6'4"	180	Freshman	Harvey, LA	Transferred to Southern Miss
De'Andre Davis	11	G	6'1"	180	Sophomore	Round Rock, TX	Transferred to New Mexico Highlands
Uros Ljeskovic	13	F	6'8"	240	Senior	Nikšić, Montenegro	Graduated
Jevon Estelle	23	G	6'3"	210	Senior	Winslow, AZ	Graduated
Zach Tolson	25	F	6'7"	200	RS Sophomore	Scottsdale, AZ	Walk-on; didn't return

=== Incoming transfers ===
Name	Number	Pos.	Height	Weight	Year	Hometown	Previous school
Shaquile Carr	3	G	6'1"	160	Junior	Las Vegas, NV	Junior college transferred from College of Southern Idaho
Darion Clark	23	F	6'7"	230	RS Senior	Conyers, GA	Transfer from USC. Will be eligible to play immediately since Clark graduated from USC.

== Incoming recruits ==
College recruiting information
Name	Hometown	School	Height	Weight	Commit date
Oscar Frayer #70 SF	Hayward, CA	Moreau Catholic High School	6 ft 6 in (1.98 m)	200 lb (91 kg)	Mar 1, 2016
Oscar Frayer #70 SF	Recruit ratings: Scout: Rivals: 247Sports: ESPN:				
Fiifi Aidoo; PG	Helsinki, FIN	Helsinki Basketball Academy	6 ft 2 in (1.88 m)	N/A	Jun 26, 2016
Fiifi Aidoo; PG	Recruit ratings: No ratings found				
Ibrahima Sankaré; PG	Thies, Senegal	St. Louis Christian Academy	6 ft 7 in (2.01 m)	N/A	Mar 8, 2016
Ibrahima Sankaré; PG	Recruit ratings: Scout: Rivals: 247Sports: ESPN:				
Overall recruit ranking:
Note: In many cases, Scout, Rivals, 247Sports, On3, and ESPN may conflict in their listings of height and weight.; In these cases, the average was taken. ESPN grades are on a 100-point scale.; Sources: "2016 Team Ranking". Rivals.

== Roster ==
2016–17 Grand Canyon Antelopes men's basketball team
Players
Coaches

Pos.	#	Name	Height	Weight	Year	Previous school	Hometown
G	0	DeWayne Russell	5 ft 11 in (1.8 m)	155 lb (70 kg)	RS Sr	Peoria; Northern Arizona	Peoria, AZ
G	1	Fiifi Aidoo	6 ft 2 in (1.88 m)	200 lb (91 kg)	Fr	Helsinki Basketball Academy	Helsinki, Finland
G	2	Joshua Braun	6 ft 4 in (1.93 m)	220 lb (100 kg)	RS Jr	Westwind Prep Academy	Anthem, AZ
G	10	Shaq Carr	6 ft 2 in (1.88 m)	172 lb (78 kg)	Jr	Canyon Springs; College of Southern Idaho	Las Vegas, NV
F	4	Oscar Frayer	6 ft 6 in (1.98 m)	191 lb (87 kg)	Fr	Moreau Catholic	Hayward, CA
F	5	Matt Jackson	6 ft 8 in (2.03 m)	230 lb (104 kg)	Jr	Diamond Valley	Diamond Creek, Australia
C	12	Boubacar Toure	6 ft 11 in (2.11 m)	240 lb (109 kg)	RS Fr	Phase One Academy	Dakar, Senegal
G	13	Ibrahima Sankaré	6 ft 7 in (2.01 m)	200 lb (91 kg)	Fr	SEED Academy	Thiès, Senegal
F	21	Kerwin Smith	6 ft 9 in (2.06 m)	222 lb (101 kg)	RS So	Woodrow Wilson	Dallas, TX
G	22	Adrian Carrion Armas (W)	5 ft 11 in (1.8 m)	173 lb (78 kg)	Jr	Canarias Basketball Academy	Seville, Spain
F	23	Darion Clark	6 ft 7 in (2.01 m)	235 lb (107 kg)	RS Sr	Oak Hill Academy; USC	Conyers, GA
F	24	Keonta Vernon	6 ft 6 in (1.98 m)	242 lb (110 kg)	RS Jr	Tulare Union; College of Southern Idaho	Tulare, CA
G	35	Kenzo Nudo	6 ft 4 in (1.93 m)	204 lb (93 kg)	RS Fr	Chaparral	Scottsdale, AZ
G	40	Nehemiah Allen (W)	6 ft 6 in (1.98 m)	170 lb (77 kg)	Fr	Lake Oswego	Lake Oswego, OR
G	42	Gerard Martin	6 ft 6 in (1.98 m)	223 lb (101 kg)	RS So	Australian Institute of Sport	Manly, Australia
G	3	Juwan Washington (W)	6 ft 1 in (1.85 m)	170 lb (77 kg)	Jr	Cheyenne HS	Las Vegas, NV

Head coach

- Dan Majerle (Central Michigan)

Assistant coach(es)

- Todd Lee (Azusa Pacific)
- Chris Crevelone (Adams State)
- T. J. Benson (Grand Canyon)

Legend

- (C) Team captain
- (S) Suspended
- (I) Ineligible
- (W) Walk-on
- Injured
- Current redshirt

Roster

== Schedule and results ==
Date time, TV	Opponent	Result	Record	Site (attendance) city, state
Exhibition
Nov 03, 2016*; 7:00 pm, Cox7	Adams State	W 88–83		GCU Arena; Phoenix, AZ
Regular season
Nov 12, 2016*; 5:00 pm, RSN	at No. 1 Duke; Hall of Fame Tip Off	L 61–96	0–1	Cameron Indoor Stadium (9,314); Durham, NC
Nov 15, 2016*; 5:00 pm, ESPN3	at Penn State; Hall of Fame Tip Off	L 76–85	0–2	Bryce Jordan Center (5,678); University Park, PA
Nov 19, 2016*; 6:00 pm, ESPN3	vs. Albany; Hall of Fame Tip Off	W 82–77	1–2	Mohegan Sun Arena; Uncasville, CT
Nov 20, 2016*; 4:00 pm, ESPN3	vs. Marist; Hall of Fame Tip Off	W 84–72	2–2	Mohegan Sun Arena (9,119); Uncasville, CT
Nov 25, 2016*; 7:00 pm, KASW	Coppin State	W 70–37	3–2	GCU Arena (7,258); Phoenix, AZ
Nov 28, 2016*; 7:00 pm, Cox7	SIU Edwardsville	L 64–76	3–3	GCU Arena (6,007); Phoenix, AZ
Dec 03, 2016*; 7:00 pm, KASW	No. 14 Louisville	L 70–79	3–4	GCU Arena (7,493); Phoenix, AZ
Dec 07, 2016*; 7:00 pm, KASW	San Diego State	W 76–72	4–4	GCU Arena (7,171); Phoenix, AZ
Dec 10, 2016*; 7:00 pm, ESPN3	UIC	W 73–69	5–4	GCU Arena (6,804); Phoenix, AZ
Dec 14, 2016*; 9:00 pm, ESPNU	at No. 19 Arizona	L 54–64	5–5	McKale Center (13,477); Tucson, AZ
Dec 17, 2016*; 7:00 pm, KASW	Mississippi Valley State	W 72–62	6–5	GCU Arena (5,926); Phoenix, AZ
Dec 20, 2016*; 7:00 pm, KASW	Alcorn State	W 63–53	7–5	GCU Arena (5,807); Phoenix, AZ
Dec 22, 2016*; 7:00 pm, KASW	Arkansas–Pine Bluff	W 89–49	8–5	GCU Arena (5,642); Phoenix, AZ
Dec 28, 2016*; 7:00 pm, KASW/ESPN3	Cal Poly	W 71–64	9–5	GCU Arena (6,757); Phoenix, AZ
Dec 31, 2016*; 2:00 pm	at UC Riverside	L 56–76	9–6	The SRC (470); Riverside, CA
Jan July 2017; 7:00 pm, KASW	Utah Valley	W 82–72	10–6 (1–0)	GCU Arena (6,933); Phoenix, AZ
Jan Dec 2017; 7:00 pm, ESPN3	at New Mexico State	L 69–81	10–7 (1–1)	Pan American Center (4,800); Las Cruces, NM
Jan 14, 2017; 6:00 pm, ASN	at Texas–Rio Grande Valley	W 79–66	11–7 (2–1)	UTRGV Fieldhouse (1,614); Edinburg, TX
Jan 17, 2017*; 7:00 pm, KASW	San Diego Christian	W 90–58	12–7	GCU Arena (6,877); Phoenix, AZ
Jan 21, 2017; 7:00 pm, KTVK	Seattle	W 61–59	13–7 (3–1)	GCU Arena (7,320); Phoenix, AZ
Jan 26, 2017; 6:00 pm, ASN	at UMKC	L 77–83	13–8 (3–2)	Municipal Auditorium (1,178); Kansas City, MO
Jan 28, 2017; 6:00 pm	at Chicago State	W 85–77 ^{2OT}	14–8 (4–2)	Jones Convocation Center (1,526); Chicago, IL
Jan 31, 2017*; 7:00 pm, Cox7	Bethesda	W 95–66	15–8	GCU Arena (7,222); Phoenix, AZ
Feb 04, 2017; 7:00 pm, KASW	Cal State Bakersfield	L 62–65	15–9 (4–3)	GCU Arena (7,237); Phoenix, AZ
Feb 09, 2017; 7:00 pm, Cox7	Texas–Rio Grande Valley	W 76–57	16–9 (5–3)	GCU Arena (5,897); Phoenix, AZ
Feb Nov 2017; 7:00 pm, KTVK	New Mexico State	W 83–71	17–9 (6–3)	GCU Arena (7,479); Phoenix, AZ
Feb 16, 2017; 8:00 pm	at Seattle	W 61–58	18–9 (7–3)	Connolly Center (878); Seattle, WA
Feb 18, 2017; 7:00 pm	at Utah Valley	W 77–71	19–9 (8–3)	UCCU Center (3,265); Orem, UT
Feb 23, 2017; 7:00 pm, Cox7	Chicago State	W 82–59	20–9 (9–3)	GCU Arena (7,376); Phoenix, AZ
Feb 25, 2017; 7:00 pm, KASW	UMKC	W 84–77	21–9 (10–3)	GCU Arena (7,502); Phoenix, AZ
Mar 04, 2017; 8:00 pm, ASN	at Cal State Bakersfield	W 58–52	22–9 (11–3)	Icardo Center (3,298); Bakersfield, CA
*Non-conference game. ^{#}Rankings from AP Poll. (#) Tournament seedings in parentheses. All times are in Mountain Time.
