= 2017 WAC men's basketball tournament =

2017 Western Athletic Conference men's basketball tournament
- Classification: Division I
- Season: 2016–17
- Teams: 7
- Site: Orleans Arena; Paradise, Nevada
- Champions: New Mexico State Aggies (7th title)
- Winning coach: Paul Weir (1st title)
- MVP: Ian Baker (New Mexico State)
- Television: ESPNU

2016–17 WAC men's basketball standings
	Conf.				Overall
Team	W		L	PCT	W		L	PCT
Cal State Bakersfield	12	–	2	.857	25	–	10	.714
New Mexico State †	11	–	3	.786	28	–	6	.824
Grand Canyon *	11	–	3	.786	22	–	9	.710
UMKC	8	–	6	.571	18	–	17	.514
Utah Valley	6	–	8	.429	17	–	17	.500
Seattle	5	–	9	.357	13	–	17	.433
Texas–Rio Grande Valley	2	–	12	.143	10	–	22	.313
Chicago State	1	–	13	.071	6	–	26	.188
† 2017 WAC tournament winner * Ineligible for postseason during transition to NCAA Division I.

The 2017 WAC men's basketball tournament is a postseason men's basketball tournament for the Western Athletic Conference. It was held from March 9–11, 2017 at Orleans Arena in Paradise, Nevada. The winner of the tournament, New Mexico State, received the conference's automatic bid to the NCAA tournament with a 70-60 win over California State-Bakersfield.

== Seeds ==
Grand Canyon was ineligible to participate in the conference tournament during its transition to Division I. The remaining seven teams participated in the tournament. The top seed received a bye to the semifinals. Teams were seeded by record within the conference, with a tiebreaker system to seed teams with identical conference records.

Seed	School	Conference
1	Cal State Bakersfield	12–2
2	New Mexico State	11–3
3	UMKC	8–6
4	Utah Valley	6–8
5	Seattle	5–9
6	UT Rio Grande Valley	2–12
7	Chicago State	1–13

== Schedule ==
Game	Time*	Matchup	Score	Television
Quarterfinals – Thursday, March 9
1	2:00 pm	No. 5 Seattle vs. No. 4 Utah Valley	53–65	WAC Digital Network
2	4:30 pm	No. 7 Chicago State vs. No. 2 New Mexico State	53–67	WAC Digital Network
3	7:00 pm	No. 6 UT Rio Grande Valley vs. No. 3 UMKC	78–82^{OT}	WAC Digital Network
Semifinals – Friday, March 10
4	6:00 pm	No. 4 Utah Valley vs. No. 1 Cal State Bakersfield	80–81^{4OT}	ESPN3
5	8:30 pm	No. 3 UMKC vs. No. 2 New Mexico State	60–78	ESPN3
Championship – Saturday, March 11
6	8:00 pm	No.1 Cal State Bakersfield vs. No. 2 New Mexico State	60–70	ESPNU
*Game times in PT. Rankings denote tournament seeding.

== Bracket ==
Quarterfinals; Thursday, March 9 WAC Digital Network
4	Utah Valley	65
5	Seattle	53
2	New Mexico State	67
7	Chicago State	53
3	UMKC	82
6	UT Rio Grande Valley	78 ^{OT}

Semifinals; Friday, March 10; ESPN3
1	Cal State Bakersfield	81
4	Utah Valley	80 ^{4OT}
2	New Mexico State	78
3	UMKC	60

Championship; Saturday, March 11; ESPNU
1	Cal State Bakersfield	60
2	New Mexico State	70
