= Louis Adams (basketball, born 1996) =

American basketball player (born 1996)

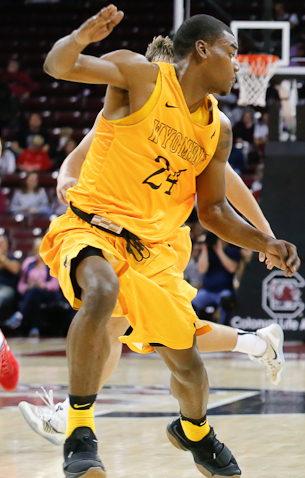

Personal information
- Born: 22 February 1996 (age 30) Chicago, Illinois, U.S.
- Listed height: 6 ft 4 in (1.93 m)
- Listed weight: 185 lb (84 kg)

Career information
- High school: Orr Academy (Chicago, Illinois)
- College: Indian Hills Community College (2014-2015); Odessa (2015–2016); Wyoming (2016–2018)
- NBA draft: 2018: undrafted
- Playing career: 2018–2020
- Position: Shooting guard / point guard

Career history
- 2018–2019: Champagne Châlons-Reims
- 2020: Ostioneros de Guaymas

Career highlights
- CBI champion (2017)

Louis Keyshaun Adams Jr. (born 22 February 1996) is an American basketball player for Ostioneros de Guaymas of the Mexican Circuito de Baloncesto de la Costa del Pacífico (CIBACOPA).

== Early life ==
Adams played basketball for his father, Louis Adams Sr, at Orr Academy High School.

== College career ==
In July 2016, Adams signed a letter of intent to play basketball for the University of Wyoming after transferring from Odessa College. He had a 31-point performance against New Mexico as a senior after missing two games with an ankle injury. As a senior, he averaged 9.7 points per game while shooting 42% from the three-point line.

== Professional career ==
On August 10, 2018, he signed with Champagne Châlons-Reims of the French side. He played there during the 2018–19 Pro A season.

In March 2020, Adams signed with Ostioneros de Guaymas in Mexico.
