= Ian Baker (basketball) =

American basketball player (born 1993)

Trefl Sopot
- Position: Point guard
- League: PLK

Personal information
- Born: February 9, 1993 (age 33)
- Listed height: 6 ft 1 in (1.85 m)
- Listed weight: 180 lb (82 kg)

Career information
- High school: Arlington Country Day (Jacksonville, Florida)
- College: New Mexico State (2013–2017)
- NBA draft: 2017: undrafted
- Playing career: 2017–present

Career history
- 2017–2018: South Bay Lakers
- 2018–present: Trefl Sopot

Career highlights
- WAC Player of the Year (2017); AP honorable mention All-American (2017)

Ian Baker (born February 9, 1993) is an American professional basketball player for Trefl Sopot of the Polish Basketball League (PLK). He played college basketball for New Mexico State.

== College career ==
As a junior, Baker averaged 13.8 points, 3.7 assists, 1.1 steals per game and was selected to the First Team All-WAC. He declared for the 2016 NBA draft, but did not hire an agent and ultimately returned to school. In his senior year, he was named WAC Player of the Year. Baker averaged 17.3 points, 5.1 assists (2nd in WAC), and 4.9 rebounds per game. Baker was named WAC player of the week three times. He was also named MVP of the 2017 WAC men's basketball tournament.

== Professional career ==
On August 1, 2017, Baker signed a two-year deal with Serbian club Partizan. On September 1, Baker and Partizan mutually agreed to part ways after Baker suffered a lower leg fracture.
