= 2017 College Basketball Invitational =

College basketball tournament

- Teams: 16
- Finals site: HTC Center/ Arena-Auditorium, Conway, South Carolina/ Laramie, Wyoming
- Champions: Wyoming Cowboys (1st title)
- Runner-up: Coastal Carolina Chanticleers (1st title game)
- Semifinalists: UIC Flames (1st semifinal); Utah Valley Wolverines (1st semifinal)
- Winning coach: Allen Edwards (1st title)
- MVP: Justin James (Wyoming)
- Attendance: 30,463

The 2017 College Basketball Invitational (CBI) was a single-elimination tournament of sixteen National Collegiate Athletic Association (NCAA) Division I teams that did not participate in the 2017 NCAA Men's Division I Basketball Tournament or the 2017 National Invitation Tournament. The opening round games were held on March 15 & 16 and the quarterfinal round games were held on March 20. After the quarterfinals, the brackets were reseeded for the semifinal round games which were held on March 22. A best of three final round series closed out the tournament on March 27, 29, and 31. All games were hosted in on-site campus venues.

== Participants ==
The following teams were announced as participants Sunday, March 12 after the NCAA Selection Show.

Team	Conference	Overall record	Conference record
Coastal Carolina	Sun Belt	16–17	10–8
Eastern Washington	Big Sky	22–11	13–5
George Mason	Atlantic 10	20–13	9–9
George Washington	Atlantic 10	19–14	10–8
Georgia Southern	Sun Belt	18–14	11–7
Green Bay	Horizon	18–13	12–6
Hampton	MEAC	14–16	11–5
UIC	Horizon	15–18	7–11
Loyola (MD)	Patriot	15–16	8–10
UMKC	WAC	17–16	8–6
Rice	C-USA	22–11	11–7
San Francisco	West Coast	20–12	10–8
Stony Brook	America East	18–13	12–4
Toledo	Mid-American	17–16	9–9
Utah Valley	WAC	15–16	6–8
Wyoming	Mountain West	18–14	8–10

=== Declined invitations ===
The following team declined an invitation to the 2017 CBI:

- Auburn

== Schedule ==
Date	Time*	Matchup	Television	Score	Attendance
First round
March 15	7:00 pm	Hampton at **Coastal Carolina**	Sinclair RSN's	67–83	937
March 15	7:00 pm	**Loyola (MD)** at George Mason	A10 DN	73–58	1,400
March 15	7:00 pm	Toledo at **George Washington**	A10 DN	69–73	1,016
March 15	7:00 pm	**Utah Valley** at Georgia Southern		74–49	603
March 15	8:00 pm	Green Bay at **UMKC**	Roo's All-Access	82–92	1,128
March 15	8:00 pm	San Francisco at **Rice**	CUSA.TV	76–85	1,349
March 15	9:00 pm	Eastern Washington at **Wyoming**	MW Net	81–91	1,803
March 16	8:00 pm	Stony Brook at **UIC**		69–71	1,197
Quarterfinals
March 20	7:00 pm	Loyola (MD) at **Coastal Carolina**	Sinclair RSN's	63–72	948
March 20	8:00 pm	George Washington at **UIC**	ESPN3	71–80	1,048
March 20	8:00 pm	**Utah Valley** at Rice	CUSA.TV	85–79	1,584
March 20	9:00 pm	UMKC at **Wyoming**	MW Net	61–72	2,311
Semifinals
March 22	7:00 pm	UIC at **Coastal Carolina**	Sinclair RSN's	78–89	847
March 22	9:00 pm	Utah Valley at **Wyoming**	MW Net	68–74	2,577
Finals
March 27	8:30 pm	Wyoming at **Coastal Carolina**	ESPNU	81–91	1,583
March 29	8:30 pm	Coastal Carolina at **Wyoming**	ESPNU	57–81	3,811
March 31	7:00 pm	Coastal Carolina at **Wyoming**	ESPNU	59–83	6,321
*All times are listed as Eastern Daylight Time (UTC-4). Winning team in **bold**.

== Bracket ==
First round March 15 & 16
Wyoming	91
Eastern Washington	81
UMKC	92
Green Bay	82
Rice	85
San Francisco	76
Georgia Southern	49
Utah Valley	74
Coastal Carolina	83
Hampton	67
George Mason	58
Loyola (MD)	73
UIC	71
Stony Brook	69
George Washington	73
Toledo	69

Quarterfinals; March 20
Wyoming	72
UMKC	61
Rice	79
Utah Valley	85
Coastal Carolina	72
Loyola (MD)	63
UIC	80
George Washington	71

Semifinals (Reseeded); March 22
Wyoming	74
Utah Valley	68
Coastal Carolina	89
UIC	78

Finals (Best of three); March 27, 29, 31
Wyoming	81	81	83
Coastal Carolina	91	57	59

Home teams listed first.
