= 2016–17 Utah State Aggies men's basketball team =

American college basketball season

2016–17 Utah State Aggies men's basketball
- Conference: Mountain West Conference
- Record: 14–17 (7–11 MW)
- Head coach: Tim Duryea (2nd season)
- Assistant coaches: Chris Jones; Tarvish Felton; Louis Wilson
- Home arena: Smith Spectrum

2016–17 Mountain West Conference men's basketball standings
	Conf.				Overall
Team	W		L	PCT	W		L	PCT
Nevada †	14	–	4	.778	28	–	7	.800
Colorado State	13	–	5	.722	24	–	12	.667
Boise State	12	–	6	.667	20	–	12	.625
Fresno State	11	–	7	.611	20	–	13	.606
New Mexico	10	–	8	.556	17	–	14	.548
San Diego State	9	–	9	.500	19	–	14	.576
Wyoming	8	–	10	.444	23	–	15	.605
San Jose State	7	–	11	.389	14	–	16	.467
Utah State	7	–	11	.389	14	–	17	.452
Air Force	4	–	14	.222	12	–	21	.364
UNLV	4	–	14	.222	11	–	21	.344
† Conference tournament winner

The 2016–17 Utah State Aggies men's basketball team represented Utah State University in the 2016–17 NCAA Division I men's basketball season. This was head coach Tim Duryea's second season at Utah State. The Aggies played their home games at the Dee Glen Smith Spectrum in Logan, Utah as members of the Mountain West Conference. They finished the season 14–17, 7–11 in Mountain West play to finish in tie for eighth place. They defeated San Jose State in the first round of the Mountain West tournament to advance to the quarterfinals where they lost to Nevada.

== Previous season ==
The Aggies finished the 2015–16 season 16–15, 7–11 in Mountain West play to finish in a tie for eighth place. They defeated Wyoming to advance to the quarterfinals of the Mountain West tournament where they lost to San Diego State.

== Departures ==
Name	Number	Pos.	Height	Weight	Year	Hometown	Notes
Trace Cureton	0	G/F	6'4"	185	Senior	Indianapolis, IN	Graduated
Darius Perkins	2	G	6'1"	200	Senior	Fort Myers, FL	Graduated
Lew Evans	12	F	6'6"	235	RS Junior	Salt Lake City, UT	Graduated transferred to Tennessee
David Collette	13	F	6'8"	220	Junior	Murray, UT	Transferred to Utah
Henry Bolton	20	G	6'3"	190	Sophomore	Portsmouth, RI	Transferred to USC Aiken
Jake Miles	21	G	6'2"	180	Freshman	Morgan, UT	Walk-on; didn't return
John Middleton	24	G	6'4"	215	Freshman	Atlantic City, NJ	Walk-on; transferred to Valparaiso
Grayson Moore	32	G	6'7"	200	RS Senior	North Logan, UT	Graduated
Chris Smith	34	G	6'4"	210	Senior	Sacramento, CA	Graduated
Elston Jones	50	F	6'9"	240	Sophomore	Goodyear, AZ	Transferred to UC Irvine

=== Incoming transfers ===
Name	Number	Pos.	Height	Weight	Year	Hometown	Notes
Ngor Barnaba	13	F	6'9"	225	Junior	Dražkovce, Slovakia	Junior college transferred from Missouri–West Plains.
Norbert Janicek	15	C	6'11"	230	Sophomore	Dražkovce, Slovakia	Junior college transferred from Snow College.

== Recruiting ==
College recruiting information
Name	Hometown	School	Height	Weight	Commit date
Koby McEwen #21 PG	Toronto, ON	Wasatch Academy	6 ft 3 in (1.91 m)	175 lb (79 kg)	Sep 7, 2015
Koby McEwen #21 PG	Recruit ratings: Scout: Rivals: (80)				
Daron Henson #61 PF	Los Angeles, CA	Cathedral High School	6 ft 7 in (2.01 m)	190 lb (86 kg)	Oct 16, 2015
Daron Henson #61 PF	Recruit ratings: Scout: Rivals: (73)				
Klay Stall #66 PF	Chandler, AZ	Basha High School	6 ft 9 in (2.06 m)	225 lb (102 kg)	Aug 7, 2015
Klay Stall #66 PF	Recruit ratings: Scout: Rivals: (70)				
Diogo Brito; SG	Grundy, VA	Mountain Mission School	6 ft 5 in (1.96 m)	195 lb (88 kg)	May 14, 2016
Diogo Brito; SG	Recruit ratings: Scout: Rivals: (NR)				
Overall recruit ranking: Scout: – Rivals: –
Note: In many cases, Scout, Rivals, 247Sports, On3, and ESPN may conflict in their listings of height and weight.; In these cases, the average was taken. ESPN grades are on a 100-point scale.; Sources: "2016 Team Ranking". Rivals.

== Roster ==
2016–17 Utah State Aggies men's basketball team
Players
Coaches

Pos.	#	Name	Height	Weight	Year	Previous school	Hometown
G	0	Shane Rector	6 ft 2 in (1.88 m)	180 lb (82 kg)	Sr	South Kent School; Miami Dade College	Bronx, NY
G	1	Koby McEwen	6 ft 3 in (1.91 m)	180 lb (82 kg)	Fr	Wasatch Academy	Toronto, ON
F	2	Klay Stall	6 ft 9 in (2.06 m)	225 lb (102 kg)	Fr	Basha HS	Chandler, AZ
G	3	Sam Merrill	6 ft 4 in (1.93 m)	195 lb (88 kg)	Fr	Bountiful HS	Bountiful, UT
G	5	Julion Pearre	6 ft 3 in (1.91 m)	195 lb (88 kg)	Jr	McKinney North HS	McKinney, TX
F	10	Quinn Taylor	6 ft 8 in (2.03 m)	225 lb (102 kg)	RS So	Langham Creek	Houston, TX
F	11	Alexis Dargenton	6 ft 8 in (2.03 m)	190 lb (86 kg)	RS So	Laramie County CC	Fort-de-France, Martinique
F	13	Ngor Barnaba	6 ft 8 in (2.03 m)	235 lb (107 kg)	Jr	John Marshall HS; Missouri–West Plains	Rochester, MN
G/F	14	Jalen Moore	6 ft 9 in (2.06 m)	220 lb (100 kg)	Sr	Sky View	Smithfield, UT
F	15	Norbert Janicek	6 ft 10 in (2.08 m)	235 lb (107 kg)	So	Canarias Basketball Academy; Snow College	Dražkovce, Slovakia
G/F	23	Daron Henson	6 ft 8 in (2.03 m)	190 lb (86 kg)	Fr	Cathedral HS	Los Angeles, CA
G	24	Diogo Brito	6 ft 5 in (1.96 m)	190 lb (86 kg)	So	Mountain Mission HS	Portugal
G	25	Connor Garner	6 ft 3 in (1.91 m)	200 lb (91 kg)	Sr	Declo HS	Raft River, ID
G	30	Abel Porter (W)	6 ft 2 in (1.88 m)	190 lb (86 kg)	Fr	Davis HS	Farmington, UT
F	32	Trevin Dorius (W)	6 ft 10 in (2.08 m)	215 lb (98 kg)	Fr	Wasatch HS	Heber City, UT

Head coach

- Tim Duryea (North Texas)

Assistant coach(es)

- Spencer Nelson (Utah State)
- Tarvish Felton (Southern Utah University)
- Louis Wilson (William Jewell College)

Legend

- (C) Team captain
- (S) Suspended
- (I) Ineligible
- (W) Walk-on
- Injured
- Current redshirt

== Schedule and results ==
Date time, TV	Rank^{#}	Opponent^{#}	Result	Record	Site (attendance) city, state
Exhibition
11/04/2016*; 7:00 pm		Southern Virginia	W 83–55		Smith Spectrum (5,710); Logan, UT
11/16/2016*; 7:00 pm		Bristol (CA)	W 96–53		Smith Spectrum (8,264); Logan, UT
Non-conference regular season
11/11/2016*; 8:00 pm		at UC Irvine	W 72–56	1–0	Bren Events Center (1,883); Irvine, CA
11/14/2016*; 7:00 pm		NJIT; Cancún Challenge	W 93–84	2–0	Smith Spectrum (8,584); Logan, UT
11/19/2016*; 7:00 pm		Idaho State; Cancún Challenge	W 85–51	3–0	Smith Spectrum (8,923); Logan, UT
11/22/2016*; 6:30 pm, CBSSN		vs. No. 17 Purdue; Cancún Challenge semifinals	L 64–85	3–1	Hard Rock Hotel Riviera Maya (1,610); Cancún, Mexico
11/23/2016*; 4:00 pm, CBSSN		vs. Texas Tech; Cancún Challenge 3rd place game	L 51–75	3–2	Hard Rock Hotel Riviera Maya (1,610); Cancún, Mexico
11/30/2016*; 7:00 pm, BYUtv		vs. BYU; Old Oquirrh Bucket	L 63–77	3–3	Vivint Smart Home Arena (12,187); Salt Lake City, UT
12/03/2016*; 7:00 pm		Indiana State; MW–MVC Challenge	L 61–62	3–4	Smith Spectrum (7,064); Logan, UT
12/06/2016*; 7:00 pm		Great Falls	W 84–51	4–4	Smith Spectrum (5,932); Logan, UT
12/10/2016*; 7:00 pm		at Utah Valley; Old Oquirrh Bucket	W 80–79 ^{OT}	5–4	UCCU Center (6,792); Orem, UT
12/19/2016*; 7:00 pm		New Orleans	W 76–66	6–4	Smith Spectrum (5,825); Logan, UT
12/21/2016*; 7:00 pm		Weber State; Old Oquirrh Bucket	L 71–77	6–5	Smith Spectrum (6,270); Logan, UT
Mountain West regular season
12/28/2016; 7:00 pm, RTUT		Boise State	L 80–83	6–6 (0–1)	Smith Spectrum (7,227); Logan, UT
12/31/2016; 12:00 pm, RTUT		at Air Force	L 73–78	6–7 (0–2)	Clune Arena (1,143); Colorado Springs, CO
01/04/2017; 9:00 pm, ESPNU		New Mexico	W 79–75	7–7 (1–2)	Smith Spectrum (3,897); Logan, UT
01/07/2017; 4:00 pm, CBSSN		UNLV	W 79–63	8–7 (2–2)	Smith Spectrum (6,080); Logan, UT
01/11/2017; 7:00 pm, RTUT		at Wyoming	L 87–95	8–8 (2–3)	Arena-Auditorium (4,547); Laramie, WY
01/14/2017; 8:00 pm, ESPN3		at San Diego State	L 55–74	8–9 (2–4)	Viejas Arena (12,414); San Diego, CA
01/21/2017; 7:00 pm, MWN		Colorado State	L 56–64	8–10 (2–5)	Smith Spectrum (8,854); Logan, UT
01/25/2017; 9:00 pm, ESPNU		at New Mexico	L 61–74	8–11 (2–6)	The Pit (10,698); Albuquerque, NM
01/28/2017; 7:00 pm		Fresno State	W 78–65	9–11 (3–6)	Smith Spectrum (6,835); Logan, UT
02/01/2017; 7:00 pm, ESPN3		Nevada	W 74–57	10–11 (4–6)	Smith Spectrum (6,122); Logan, UT
02/04/2017; 6:00 pm, ESPN3		at Boise State	L 70–72	10–12 (4–7)	Taco Bell Arena (7,560); Boise, ID
02/07/2017; 7:00 pm		at Colorado State	L 52–69	10–13 (4–8)	Moby Arena (2,763); Fort Collins, CO
02/11/2017; 7:00 pm		Wyoming	W 81–74	11–13 (5–8)	Smith Spectrum (7,027); Logan, UT
02/15/2017; 8:00 pm, CBSSN		San Diego State	L 62–66	11–14 (5–9)	Smith Spectrum (6,427); Logan, UT
02/18/2017; 6:00 pm, ESPN3		at Nevada	L 66–77	11–15 (5–10)	Lawlor Events Center (10,336); Reno, NV
02/22/2017; 8:00 pm		at San Jose State	W 81–75	12–15 (6–10)	Event Center Arena (2,316); San Jose, CA
02/25/2017; 7:00 pm, RTUT		Air Force	W 89–58	13–15 (7–10)	Smith Spectrum (8,015); Logan, UT
03/01/2017; 9:00 pm, ESPNU		at UNLV	L 59–66	13–16 (7–11)	Thomas & Mack Center (9,931); Paradise, NV
Mountain West tournament
03/08/2017; 12:00 pm, MWN	(8)	vs. (9) San Jose State; First round	W 90–64	14–16	Thomas & Mack Center (4,979); Paradise, NV
03/09/2017; 1:00 pm, CBSSN	(8)	vs. (1) Nevada; Quarterfinals	L 69–83	14–17	Thomas & Mack Center (5,866); Paradise, NV
*Non-conference game. ^{#}Rankings from AP Poll. (#) Tournament seedings in parentheses. All times are in Mountain Source.
