= Jordan Caroline =

American basketball player (born 1996)

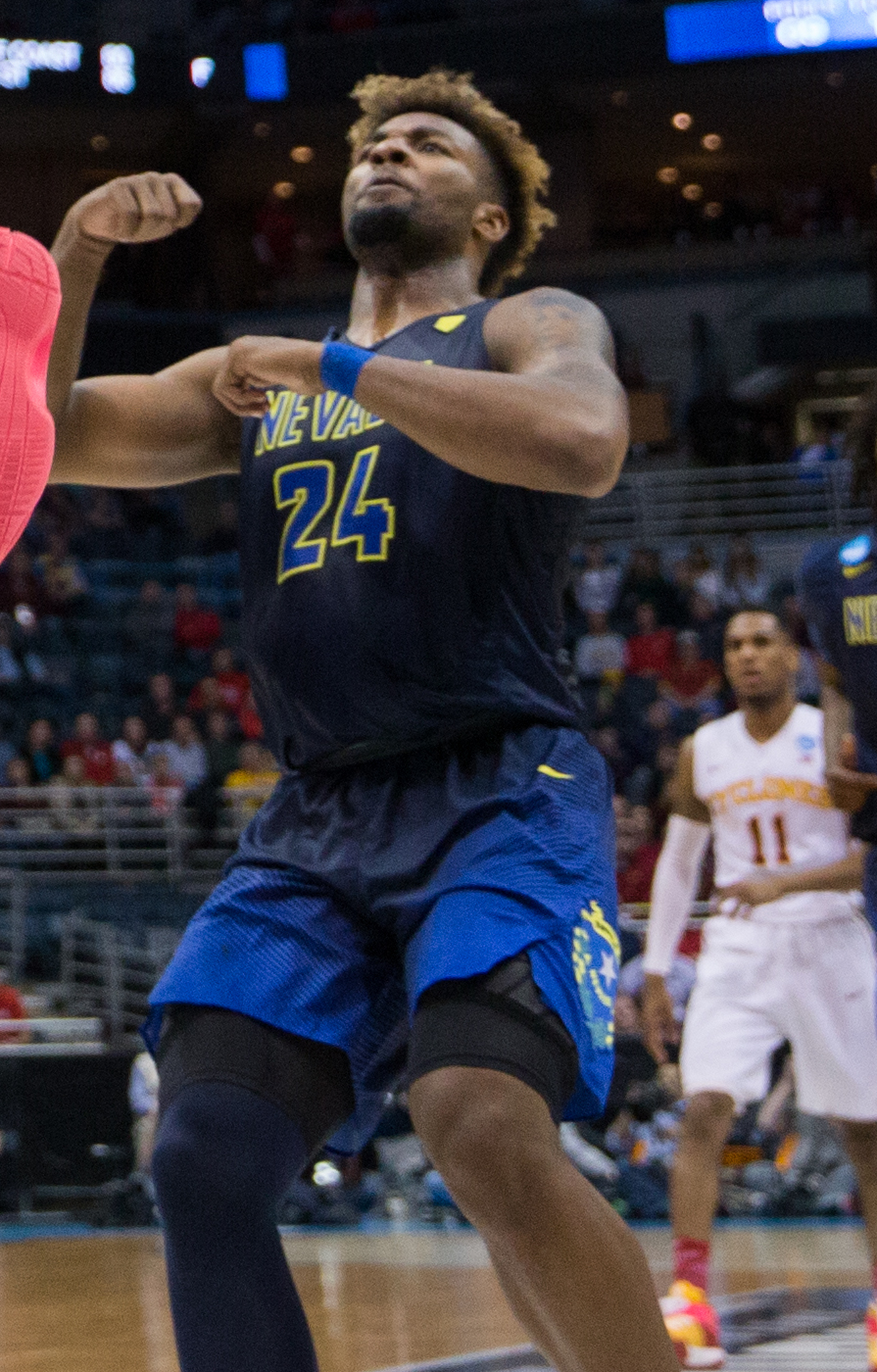
- Caroline with Nevada in 2017

No. 17 – TSG GhostHawks
- Position: Small forward / power forward
- League: P. League+

Personal information
- Born: January 15, 1996 (age 30) Champaign, Illinois, U.S.
- Listed height: 6 ft 7 in (2.01 m)
- Listed weight: 235 lb (107 kg)

Career information
- High school: Champaign Central (Champaign, Illinois); Montverde Academy (Montverde, Florida)
- College: Southern Illinois (2014–2015); Nevada (2016–2019)
- NBA draft: 2019: undrafted
- Playing career: 2019–present

Career history
- 2019–2020: South Bay Lakers
- 2020: Hapoel Eilat
- 2021: Kaohsiung Jeoutai Technology
- 2021–2022: Dolomiti Energia Trento
- 2022: Melbourne United
- 2022: Baxi Manresa
- 2023: Fuenlabrada
- 2023–2024: Kobe Storks
- 2025: Treviso
- 2025–2026: Saint-Quentin
- 2026: Rytas Vilnius
- 2026–present: TSG GhostHawks

Career highlights
- FIBA Champions League champion (2026); 2× First-team All-Mountain West (2018, 2019); Mountain West All-Defensive Team (2019); Second-team All-Mountain West (2017); Mountain West tournament MVP (2017); MVC All-Freshman Team (2015)
- Stats at Basketball Reference

Jordan Christopher Caroline (born January 15, 1996) is an American professional basketball player for TSG GhostHawks of the Taiwanese P. League+. He played college basketball for the Southern Illinois Salukis and the Nevada Wolf Pack.

== Early life and high school career ==
Caroline's maternal grandfather was J. C. Caroline, who was a running back for Illinois and led the nation in rushing as a sophomore in 1953 before playing 10 seasons for the Chicago Bears, primarily as a defensive back. His father, Simeon Rice, was an All-America defensive end at Illinois in 1994 and 1995 and was picked third in the NFL draft and played 12 NFL seasons. His mother Jayna Caroline, was a track athlete in high school and graduated from Illinois. Growing up, Jordan never felt any pressure to play football though did dabble in the sport as well as swimming, though he focused on basketball. In middle school he played on the same AAU program, Team Trouble, as future Loyola-Chicago forward Donte Ingram. Caroline went to Bristow Middle School in Brentwood, Ca and to Edison Middle School in Champaign, IL. Caroline played two years of high school basketball for Champaign Central High School before transferring to Montverde Academy. Playing alongside Ben Simmons and D'Angelo Russell, Caroline helped the team to back-to-back national titles in 2013 and 2014.

== College career ==
Caroline was named to the Missouri Valley Conference All-Freshman Team at Southern Illinois. He averaged 9.2 points and 6.2 rebounds per game as a freshman. After the season, decided to transfer and received scholarship offers from Cincinnati, Xavier and Minnesota before picking Nevada.

Caroline was named Most Outstanding Player of the South Point Holiday Hoops Classic in December 2016 after contributing 20 points and 12 rebounds in a 67–66 win over UC Santa Barbara. Caroline earned Second-team All-Mountain West and Mountain West tournament MVP honors his sophomore season in leading Nevada to a tournament title and NCAA Tournament berth. He averaged 15.0 points and 9.2 rebounds per game as a sophomore. Coming into his junior season, Caroline was named to the Preseason All-Conference Team. As a junior, he averaged 17.7 points and a Pack-leading 8.6 rebounds per game while shooting 47.4 percent from the field. Caroline was a first-team All-Mountain West selection by the conference coaches and media, first-team NABC District 17 and a USBWA District VIII selection. He was named to the Mountain West All-Tournament Team and led the Wolf Pack to the NCAA Tournament Sweet 16 after comeback wins over Texas and Cincinnati. Caroline tested the waters of the 2018 NBA draft, but ultimately opted to return to Nevada for his senior season.

Coming into his senior season, Caroline was named to the Preseason MWC Team. On March 2, 2019, Caroline scored his 2,000th career point in a loss to Utah State. He punched a glass fire extinguisher near the locker room after the game as part of a fracas in the handshake line. Caroline finished his senior season averaging 17.0 points per game, 9.6 rebounds, and 1.9 assists per game despite straining his Achilles late in the season. Caroline also broke the Mountain West record for the most double doubles in a career previously held by Utah's Andrew Bogut.

== Professional career ==
After going undrafted in the 2019 NBA draft, Caroline joined the Los Angeles Lakers for the 2019 NBA Summer League. He signed with the Lakers on July 20, but was waived on October 4 after undergoing surgery on his foot in September. He subsequently joined the Lakers' NBA G League affiliate, the South Bay Lakers. On January 3, 2020, he scored a season-high 20 points in a loss to the Sioux Falls Skyforce. Caroline had a groin injury in January and missed the remainder of the G League season. He averaged 11.6 points, 8.1 rebounds, and 2.5 assists per game.

On May 15, 2020, Caroline signed with Hapoel Eilat of the Israeli Basketball Premier League. He averaged 15.3 points and 9.9 rebounds per game during their resumed 2019–20 season following the league's COVID suspension.

On March 2, 2021, Caroline signed with Kaohsiung Jeoutai Technology of the Super Basketball League.

On June 30, 2021, Caroline signed with Dolomiti Energia Trento of the Italian Lega Basket Serie A (LBA).

On August 4, 2022, Caroline signed with Melbourne United in Australia for the 2022–23 NBL season. He was released by United on November 16, 2022.

On November 17, 2022, Caroline signed with Baxi Manresa of the Liga ACB. On December 31, his contract was terminated.

On January 4, 2023, Caroline signed with Fuenlabrada of the Liga ACB.

On August 3, 2023, Caroline signed with Kobe Storks of the B.League.

On January 9, 2025, Caroline signed with Treviso of the Lega Basket Serie A.

On June 27, 2025, he signed with Saint-Quentin of the LNB Pro A.

On January 2, 2026, Caroline signed with Rytas Vilnius of the Lithuanian Basketball League (LKL) and the Basketball Champions League (BCL).

== Career statistics ==
Legend
GP	Games played	GS	Games started	MPG	Minutes per game
FG%	Field goal percentage	3P%	3-point field goal percentage	FT%	Free throw percentage
RPG	Rebounds per game	APG	Assists per game	SPG	Steals per game
BPG	Blocks per game	PPG	Points per game	**Bold**	Career high

=== College ===
Year	Team	GP	GS	MPG	FG%	3P%	FT%	RPG	APG	SPG	BPG	PPG
2014–15	Southern Illinois	33	32	25.6	.448	**.667**	.660	6.2	.9	.7	.2	9.2
2015–16	Nevada	Redshirt										
2016–17	Nevada	35	34	35.1	.463	.337	.590	9.2	1.9	**1.1**	**.3**	15.0
2017–18	Nevada	**37**	**36**	34.9	**.474**	.324	**.709**	8.6	**2.2**	.7	.2	**17.7**
2018–19	Nevada	33	33	**35.5**	.452	.368	.628	**9.6**	1.9	.6	**.3**	17.0
Career		138	135	32.9	.461	.348	.646	8.4	1.8	.8	.3	14.8

== See also ==
- List of NCAA Division I men's basketball players with 2,000 points and 1,000 rebounds
