= 2016–17 Air Force Falcons men's basketball team =

American college basketball season

2016–17 Air Force Falcons men's basketball
- Conference: Mountain West Conference
- Record: 12–21 (4–14 MW)
- Head coach: Dave Pilipovich (5th season)
- Assistant coaches: Kurt Kanaskie; Andrew Moore; Nate Zandt; Evan Washington
- Home arena: Clune Arena

2016–17 Mountain West Conference men's basketball standings
	Conf.				Overall
Team	W		L	PCT	W		L	PCT
Nevada †	14	–	4	.778	28	–	7	.800
Colorado State	13	–	5	.722	24	–	12	.667
Boise State	12	–	6	.667	20	–	12	.625
Fresno State	11	–	7	.611	20	–	13	.606
New Mexico	10	–	8	.556	17	–	14	.548
San Diego State	9	–	9	.500	19	–	14	.576
Wyoming	8	–	10	.444	23	–	15	.605
San Jose State	7	–	11	.389	14	–	16	.467
Utah State	7	–	11	.389	14	–	17	.452
Air Force	4	–	14	.222	12	–	21	.364
UNLV	4	–	14	.222	11	–	21	.344
† Conference tournament winner

The 2016–17 Air Force Falcons men's basketball team represented the United States Air Force Academy during the 2016–17 NCAA Division I men's basketball season. The Falcons, led by fifth-year head coach Dave Pilipovich, played their home games at Clune Arena on the Air Force Academy's main campus in Colorado Springs, Colorado. They finished the season 12–21 with a 4–14 record in Mountain West play, tying for tenth place in the conference. They defeated Wyoming in the first round of the Mountain West tournament to advance to the quarterfinals where they lost to Colorado State.

== Previous season ==
The Falcons finished the 2015–16 season 14–18, 5–13 in Mountain West play to finish in tenth place in conference. They lost in the first round of the Mountain West tournament to UNLV.

== Departures ==
Name	Number	Pos.	Height	Weight	Year	Hometown	Notes
Jace Chacon	0	G	6'4"	195	Freshman	Everett, WA	Transferred
Dylan Clark	3	G	5'11"	165	Freshman	Cibolo, TX	No longer on team roster
David Louthan	12	G	6'2"	185	Freshman	Colorado Springs, CO	No longer on team roster
David Cooper	13	G	6'5"	190	Freshman	Olympia, WA	No longer on team roster
Dezmond James	24	G/F	6'4"	215	Sophomore	Parker, CO	No longer on team roster
Luke Lutes	31	F	6'7"	205	Sophomore	Sacramento, CA	Left the team for personal reasons
Zach Moer	41	C	6'11"	218	Senior	Dallas, TX	Graduated

== Recruiting Class of 2016 ==
College recruiting information
Name	Hometown	School	Height	Weight	Commit date
Ameka Akaya #116 SF	Hagerstown, MD	St. Maria Goretti High School	6 ft 4 in (1.93 m)	190 lb (86 kg)	Dec 7, 2015
Ameka Akaya #116 SF	Recruit ratings: Scout: Rivals: (59)				
Trey Smith; SG	Delphos, OH	Jefferson High School	6 ft 5 in (1.96 m)	195 lb (88 kg)	Jan 1, 2016
Trey Smith; SG	Recruit ratings: Scout: Rivals: (N/A)				
James Edwards; PG	Pittsburgh, PA	Plum Senior High School	6 ft 2 in (1.88 m)	165 lb (75 kg)	Sep 16, 2015
James Edwards; PG	Recruit ratings: Scout: Rivals: (N/A)				
Chris Joyce; SG	Jacksonville, FL	Bishop Kenny High School	6 ft 4 in (1.93 m)	N/A	Oct 5, 2015
Chris Joyce; SG	Recruit ratings: Scout: Rivals: (N/A)				
Breven Engelson; PF	Battle Mountain, NV	Battle Mountain High School	6 ft 8 in (2.03 m)	200 lb (91 kg)	Nov 4, 2015
Breven Engelson; PF	Recruit ratings: Scout: Rivals: (N/A)				
Matt Weir; PG	New Concord, OH	John Glenn High School	6 ft 1 in (1.85 m)	N/A	Nov 22, 2015
Matt Weir; PG	Recruit ratings: Scout: Rivals: (N/A)				
Isaac Monson; PF	Salt Lake City, UT	Olympus High School	6 ft 8 in (2.03 m)	N/A	
Isaac Monson; PF	Recruit ratings: Scout: Rivals: (N/A)				
Overall recruit ranking: Scout: – Rivals: –
Note: In many cases, Scout, Rivals, 247Sports, On3, and ESPN may conflict in their listings of height and weight.; In these cases, the average was taken. ESPN grades are on a 100-point scale.; Sources: "2016 Team Ranking". Rivals.

== Roster ==
2016–17 Air Force Falcons men's basketball team
Players
Coaches

Pos.	#	Name	Height	Weight	Year	Previous school	Hometown
G	0	Caleb Morris	6 ft 2 in (1.88 m)	188 lb (85 kg)	Fr	Army and Navy Academy	Vista, CA
F	1	Dane Norman	6 ft 7 in (2.01 m)	175 lb (79 kg)	So	Foothills Christian High School	San Diego, CA
G	2	C. J. Siples	6 ft 3 in (1.91 m)	170 lb (77 kg)	Jr	USAFA Prep School	Cibolo, TX
G	3	Sid Tomes	6 ft 4 in (1.93 m)	204 lb (93 kg)	Fr	East Ridge	Woodbury, MN
G	4	Daniel Hummer	6 ft 0 in (1.83 m)	175 lb (79 kg)	So	Upper Arlington	Upper Arlington, OH
G	5	Zach Kocur	6 ft 3 in (1.91 m)	200 lb (91 kg)	Sr	USAFA Prep School	Denver, CO
G	10	Nicholas Wells	6 ft 5 in (1.96 m)	194 lb (88 kg)	Fr	George Walton	Marietta, GA
F	12	Lavelle Scottie	6 ft 6 in (1.98 m)	181 lb (82 kg)	Fr	Arlington Heights	Fort Worth, TX
G	13	LeSean Brown	6 ft 0 in (1.83 m)	172 lb (78 kg)	Fr	TMI Episcopal	San Antonio, TX
G	15	Jacob Van	6 ft 2 in (1.88 m)	185 lb (84 kg)	Jr	Mansfield Lake Ridge	Mansfield, TX
G	20	Trevor Lyons	6 ft 3 in (1.91 m)	190 lb (86 kg)	Jr	USAFA Prep School	Newport News, VA
G	22	Pervis Louder	6 ft 2 in (1.88 m)	175 lb (79 kg)	So	Village Christian Academy	Raleigh, NC
G	23	Kobi Betts	6 ft 3 in (1.91 m)	190 lb (86 kg)	Fr	Central	Pueblo, CO
F	25	Kyle Broekhuis	6 ft 7 in (2.01 m)	200 lb (91 kg)	Sr	USAFA Prep School	Colorado Springs, CO
F	30	Jonathan DeWane	6 ft 8 in (2.03 m)	191 lb (87 kg)	Fr	Bolles	Jacksonville, FL
F	31	Garett Scheer	6 ft 6 in (1.98 m)	185 lb (84 kg)	Fr	West Career Tech	Las Vegas, NV
F	32	Ryan Manning	6 ft 6 in (1.98 m)	190 lb (86 kg)	Jr	USAFA Prep School	Sacramento, CA
C	33	Frank Toohey	6 ft 7 in (2.01 m)	215 lb (98 kg)	Jr	York Community	Elmhurst, IL
F	35	Hayden Graham	6 ft 5 in (1.96 m)	195 lb (88 kg)	Sr	Anderson	Austin, TX
C	40	Brendan Leonard	6 ft 8 in (2.03 m)	235 lb (107 kg)	Jr	Olympia	Olympia, WA
F	41	Keegan Culp	6 ft 4 in (1.93 m)	186 lb (84 kg)	Fr	Carmel	Carmel, IN
F	43	Ryan Swan	6 ft 6 in (1.98 m)	227 lb (103 kg)	Fr	Overland	Aurora, CO

Head coach

- Dave Pilipovich (Thiel)

Assistant coach(es)

- Kurt Kanaskie (La Salle)
- Andy Moore (Muskingum)
- Nate Zandt (Michigan)
- Evan Washington (Air Force)

Legend

- (C) Team captain
- (S) Suspended
- (I) Ineligible
- (W) Walk-on
- Injured
- Current redshirt

Roster

== Schedule and results ==
Date time, TV	Rank^{#}	Opponent^{#}	Result	Record	Site (attendance) city, state
Exhibition
11/04/2016*; 7:00 pm		Colorado Christian	W 81–71		Clune Arena; Colorado Springs, CO
Non-conference regular season
11/11/2016*; 5:00 pm		McPherson	W 88–71	1–0	Clune Arena (750); Colorado Springs, CO
11/14/2016*; 7:00 pm		Jacksonville	W 86–68	2–0	Clune Arena (870); Colorado Springs, CO
11/15/2016*; 7:00 pm		Johnson & Wales	W 105–62	3–0	Clune Arena (782); Colorado Springs, CO
11/20/2016*; 2:00 pm		Florida A&M; Savannah Invitational opening round	W 87–62	4–0	Clune Arena (836); Colorado Springs, CO
11/22/2016*; 7:00 pm		Stetson; Savannah Invitational opening round	W 85–72	5–0	Clune Arena (1,523); Colorado Springs, CO
11/25/2016*; 5:30 pm		vs. Akron; Savannah Invitational semifinals	L 75–84	5–1	Savannah Civic Center (2,263); Savannah, GA
11/26/2016*; 3:00 pm		vs. East Carolina; Savannah Invitational 3rd place game	L 63–70	5–2	Savannah Civic Center (2,391); Savannah, GA
11/30/2016*; 7:00 pm		at New Mexico State	L 70–78	5–3	Pan American Center (4,382); Las Cruces, NM
12/03/2016*; 7:00 pm		Missouri State; MW–MVC Challenge	W 83–70	6–3	Clune Arena (1,986); Colorado Springs, CO
12/07/2016*; 5:00 pm		at Army	L 71–79	6–4	Christl Arena (810); West Point, NY
12/10/2016*; 1:00 pm		Denver	L 65–77	6–5	Clune Arena (1,852); Colorado Springs, CO
12/19/2016*; 7:00 pm, CBSSN		Colorado	L 68–75	6–6	Clune Arena (3,530); Colorado Springs, CO
12/22/2016*; 2:00 pm		UC Davis	W 77–67	7–6	Clune Arena (1,021); Colorado Springs, CO
Mountain West regular season
12/28/2016; 7:00 pm		at Wyoming	L 72–84	7–7 (0–1)	Arena-Auditorium (5,021); Laramie, WY
12/31/2016; 12:00 pm, RTRM		Utah State	W 78–73	8–7 (1–1)	Clune Arena (1,143); Colorado Springs, CO
01/07/2017; 12:00 pm, RTRM		at Colorado State	L 58–85	8–8 (1–2)	Moby Arena (3,243); Fort Collins, CO
01/11/2017; 7:00 pm		Fresno State	W 81–72	9–8 (2–2)	Clune Arena (1,232); Colorado Springs, CO
01/14/2017; 2:00 pm		San Jose State	L 85–89	9–9 (2–3)	Clune Arena (2,417); Colorado Springs, CO
01/18/2017; 8:00 pm, RTRM		at Nevada	L 76–83	9–10 (2–4)	Lawlor Events Center (8,462); Reno, NV
01/21/2017; 4:00 pm, RTRM		at UNLV	L 85–87 ^{2OT}	9–11 (2–5)	Thomas & Mack Center (9,917); Paradise, NV
01/25/2017; 7:00 pm, ESPN3		San Diego State	W 60–57	10–11 (3–5)	Clune Arena (1,705); Colorado Springs, CO
02/01/2017; 8:00 pm, RTRM		at Fresno State	L 64–74	10–12 (3–6)	Save Mart Center (6,145); Fresno, CA
02/04/2017; 2:00 pm		Wyoming	L 74–83	10–13 (3–7)	Clune Arena (3,852); Colorado Springs, CO
02/08/2017; 7:00 pm, RTRM		New Mexico	L 67–74	10–14 (3–8)	Clune Arena (2,125); Colorado Springs, CO
02/11/2017; 4:00 pm, RTRM		at Boise State	L 66–76	10–15 (3–9)	Taco Bell Arena (7,208); Boise, ID
02/15/2017; 7:00 pm, ESPN3		Nevada	L 59–78	10–16 (3–10)	Clune Arena (1,623); Colorado Springs, CO
02/18/2017; 3:00 pm		at San Jose State	L 78–83 ^{OT}	10–17 (3–11)	Event Center Arena (2,254); San Jose, CA
02/22/2017; 2:00 pm		UNLV	W 81–58	11–17 (4–11)	Clune Arena (2,031); Colorado Springs, CO
02/25/2017; 7:00 pm, RTRM		at Utah State	L 58–89	11–18 (4–12)	Smith Spectrum (8,015); Logan, UT
03/01/2017; 8:00 pm, CBSSN		at San Diego State	L 38–51	11–19 (4–13)	Viejas Arena (12,044); San Diego, CA
03/04/2017; 2:00 pm, RTRM		Boise State	L 70–98	11–20 (4–14)	Clune Arena (2,118); Colorado Springs, CO
Mountain West tournament
03/08/2017; 2:30 pm, MWN	(10)	vs. (7) Wyoming; First round	W 83–68	12–20	Thomas & Mack Center (4,979); Paradise, NV
03/09/2017; 7:00 pm, CBSSN	(10)	vs. (2) Colorado State; Quarterfinals	L 55–81	12–21	Thomas & Mack Center (5,057); Paradise, NV
*Non-conference game. ^{#}Rankings from AP Poll. (#) Tournament seedings in parentheses. All times are in Mountain Time.

== See also ==
2016–17 Air Force Falcons women's basketball team
