= 2017 Mountain West Conference men's basketball tournament =

- Classification: Division I
- Season: 2016–17
- Teams: 11
- Site: Thomas & Mack Center; Paradise, Nevada
- Champions: Nevada Wolf Pack (1st title)
- Winning coach: Eric Musselman (1st title)
- MVP: Jordan Caroline (Nevada)
- Television: MW Net, CBSSN, CBS

2016–17 Mountain West Conference men's basketball standings
	Conf.				Overall
Team	W		L	PCT	W		L	PCT
Nevada †	14	–	4	.778	28	–	7	.800
Colorado State	13	–	5	.722	24	–	12	.667
Boise State	12	–	6	.667	20	–	12	.625
Fresno State	11	–	7	.611	20	–	13	.606
New Mexico	10	–	8	.556	17	–	14	.548
San Diego State	9	–	9	.500	19	–	14	.576
Wyoming	8	–	10	.444	23	–	15	.605
San Jose State	7	–	11	.389	14	–	16	.467
Utah State	7	–	11	.389	14	–	17	.452
Air Force	4	–	14	.222	12	–	21	.364
UNLV	4	–	14	.222	11	–	21	.344
† Conference tournament winner

The 2017 Mountain West Conference men's basketball tournament took place from March 8–11, 2017 at the Thomas & Mack Center in Las Vegas, Nevada. The winner, Nevada, received the conference's automatic bid to the 2017 NCAA tournament with a 79-71 win over Colorado State.

== Seeds ==
All 11 conference teams participated in the tournament. The top five seeds received first round byes.

Teams were seeded by record within the conference, with a tiebreaker system to seed teams with identical conference records.

Seed	School	Conference	Tiebreaker
1	Nevada	14–4	
2	Colorado State	13–5	
3	Boise State	12–6	
4	Fresno State	11–7	
5	New Mexico	10–8	
6	San Diego State	9–9	
7	Wyoming	8–10	
8	Utah State	7–11	1–0 vs. San Jose State
9	San Jose State	7–11	0–1 vs. Utah State
10	Air Force	4–14	1–1 vs. UNLV, 0–2 vs. NEV, 0–1 vs. CSU
11	UNLV	4–14	1–1 vs. AF, 0–2 vs. NEV, 0–2 vs. CSU

== Schedule ==
Game	Time*	Matchup^{#}	Television	TV announcers	MW radio announcers
First round – Wednesday, March 8
1	11:00 am	#8 Utah State 90 vs. #9 San Jose State 64	MW Net	Rich Cellini & Marty Fletcher	Nate Kreckman & Ray Giacoletti
2	1:30 pm	#7 Wyoming 68 vs. #10 Air Force 83	MW Net	Rich Cellini & Marty Fletcher	Chad Andrus & Ray Giacoletti
3	4:00 pm	#6 San Diego St 62 vs. #11 UNLV 52	MW Net	Rich Cellini & Marty Fletcher	Chad Andrus & Ray Giacoletti
Quarterfinals – Thursday, March 9
4	12:00 pm	#1 Nevada 83 vs. #8 Utah State 69	CBSSN	Brent Stover, Bob Wenzel & Evan Washburn	Nate Kreckman & Robert Smith
5	2:30 pm	#4 Fresno State 65 vs. #5 New Mexico 60	CBSSN	Brent Stover, Bob Wenzel & Evan Washburn	Chad Andrus & Robert Smith
6	6:00 pm	#2 Colorado State 81 vs. #10 Air Force 55	CBSSN	Andrew Catalon, Steve Lappas & Evan Washburn	Nate Kreckman & Marty Fletcher
7	8:30 pm	#3 Boise State 68 vs. #6 San Diego State 87	CBSSN	Andrew Catalon, Steve Lappas & Evan Washburn	Mitch Moss & Marty Fletcher
Semifinals – Friday, March 10
8	7:00 pm	#1 Nevada 83 vs. #4 Fresno State 72	CBSSN	Andrew Catalon, Steve Lappas, & Evan Washburn	
9	9:30 pm	#2 Colorado State 71 vs. #6 San Diego State 63	CBSSN	Andrew Catalon, Steve Lappas, & Evan Washburn	
Championship – Saturday, March 11
10	3:00 pm	#1 Nevada 79 vs. #2 Colorado State 71	CBS	Kevin Harlan, Reggie Miller, Dan Bonner, & Evan Washburn	
*Game times in PT. #-Rankings denote tournament seeding.

== Bracket ==
First round Wednesday, March 8 MWN
8	Utah State	90
9	San Jose State	64
7	Wyoming	68
10	Air Force	83
6	San Diego State	62*
11	UNLV	52

Quarterfinals; Thursday, March 9 CBSSN
1	Nevada	83
8	Utah State	69
4	Fresno State	65
5	New Mexico	60
2	Colorado State	81
10	Air Force	55
3	Boise State	68
6	San Diego State	87

Semifinals; Friday, March 10; CBSSN
1	Nevada	83
4	Fresno State	72
2	Colorado State	71
6	San Diego State	63

Championship; Saturday, March 11; CBS
1	Nevada	79
2	Colorado State	71

* denotes overtime period
