= 2016–17 Colorado State Rams men's basketball team =

American college basketball season

2016–17 Colorado State Rams men's basketball

NIT, Second Round
- Conference: Mountain West Conference
- Record: 24–12 (13–5 MW)
- Head coach: Larry Eustachy (5th season)
- Assistant coaches: Steve Barnes; Jase Herl; Willie Glover
- Home arena: Moby Arena

2016–17 Mountain West Conference men's basketball standings
	Conf.				Overall
Team	W		L	PCT	W		L	PCT
Nevada †	14	–	4	.778	28	–	7	.800
Colorado State	13	–	5	.722	24	–	12	.667
Boise State	12	–	6	.667	20	–	12	.625
Fresno State	11	–	7	.611	20	–	13	.606
New Mexico	10	–	8	.556	17	–	14	.548
San Diego State	9	–	9	.500	19	–	14	.576
Wyoming	8	–	10	.444	23	–	15	.605
San Jose State	7	–	11	.389	14	–	16	.467
Utah State	7	–	11	.389	14	–	17	.452
Air Force	4	–	14	.222	12	–	21	.364
UNLV	4	–	14	.222	11	–	21	.344
† Conference tournament winner

The 2016–17 Colorado State Rams men's basketball team represented Colorado State University during the 2016–17 NCAA Division I men's basketball season. The team was coached by Larry Eustachy in his fifth season. They played their home games at the Moby Arena on Colorado State University's main campus in Fort Collins, Colorado as members of the Mountain West Conference. They finished the season 24–12, 13–5 in Mountain West play to finish in second place. They defeated Air Force and San Diego State to advance to the championship game of the Mountain West tournament where they lost to Nevada. They were invited to the 2017 National Invitation Tournament where they defeated the College of Charleston in the first round before losing in the second round to Cal State Bakersfield.

== Previous season ==
The Rams finished the season 18–16, 8–10 in Mountain West play to finish in a tie for sixth place. They defeated San Jose State and Boise State to advance to the semifinals of the Mountain West tournament where they lost to Fresno State. They did not participate in a postseason tournament.

== Offseason ==
=== Departures ===
Name	Number	Pos.	Height	Weight	Year	Hometown	Notes
Antwan Scott	1	G	6'2"	178	RS Senior	Wylie, TX	Graduated
John Gillon	4	G	6'0"	168	RS Junior	Houston, TX	Graduate transferred to Syracuse
Fred Richardson III	5	G	6'7"	212	Senior	Houston, TX	Graduated
Joe De Ciman	10	G	6'6"	201	Senior	Regina, SK	Graduated
Mike Burnett	13	G	6'2"	175	RS Senior	Denver, CO	Walk-on; graduated
Tiel Daniels	15	F	6'7"	235	RS Senior	Wentzville, MO	Graduated
Toby Van Ry	41	F	6'10"	196	RS Freshman	Fort Collins, CO	Transferred to Northwest Kansas Technical College

=== Incoming transfers ===
Name	Number	Pos.	Height	Weight	Year	Hometown	Previous School
Devocio Butler	1	F	6'5"		Junior	Atlanta, GA	Junior college transferred from Hill College.
Kevin Little	4	G	6'0"	160	Junior	Wyandanch, NY	Transferred from Maine. Under NCAA transfer rules, Little will have to sit out for the 2016–17 season. Will have two years of remaining eligibility.
Kevin Dorsey	5	G	6'0"	175	Sophomore	Waldorf, MD	Transferred from Minnesota. Under NCAA transfer rules, Dorsey will have to sit out for the 2016–17 season. Will have three years of remaining eligibility.
Che Bob	10	F	6'6"	215	Junior	Charlotte, NC	Junior college transferred from South Plains College.
Lorenzo Jenkins	13	G	6'7"	210	Sophomore	Naples, FL	Transferred from Arkansas. Under NCAA transfer rules, Jenkins will have to sit out for the 2016–17 season. Will have three years of remaining eligibility.
Robbie Berwick	14	G	6'4"	188	Junior	Atascadero, CA	Transferred from Florida State. Under NCAA transfer rules, Berwick will have to sit out for the 2016–17 season. Will have two years of remaining eligibility.

=== 2016 recruiting class ===
Colorado State did not have any incoming players in the 2016 recruiting class.

=== 2017 recruiting class ===
College recruiting information (2017)
Name	Hometown	School	Height	Weight	Commit date
Felipe Haase #40 C	Los Angeles, CA	Cathedral High School	6 ft 8 in (2.03 m)	250 lb (110 kg)	May 2, 2016
Felipe Haase #40 C	Recruit ratings: Scout: Rivals: (76)				
Overall recruit ranking: Scout: – Rivals: –
Note: In many cases, Scout, Rivals, 247Sports, On3, and ESPN may conflict in their listings of height and weight.; In these cases, the average was taken. ESPN grades are on a 100-point scale.; Sources: "Colorado State Commit List for 2017". Rivals.; "Men's Basketball Recruiting". Scout.; "ESPN – Colorado State Rams Basketball Recruiting 2017". ESPN.; "Scout.com Team Recruiting Rankings". Scout.; "2017 Team Ranking". Rivals.

== Roster ==
2016–17 Colorado State Rams men's basketball team
Players
Coaches

Pos.	#	Name	Height	Weight	Year	Previous school	Hometown
F	0	Kimani Jackson	6 ft 8 in (2.03 m)	223 lb (101 kg)	RS Jr	Seguin HS; New Mexico JC	Arlington, TX
G	1	Devocio Butler	6 ft 5 in (1.96 m)	205 lb (93 kg)	Jr	South Cobb HS; Hill College	Atlanta, GA
F	2	Emmanuel Omogbo	6 ft 8 in (2.03 m)	210 lb (95 kg)	Sr	The Kiski School; South Plains College	Hyattsville, MD
G	3	Gian Clavell	6 ft 4 in (1.93 m)	185 lb (84 kg)	RS Sr	Hialeah Gardens HS; Northwest Kansas Tech Coll.	Caguas, PR
G	4	Kevin Little (I) (redshirt)	6 ft 0 in (1.83 m)	160 lb (73 kg)	Jr	Coastal Academy; Maine	Wyandanch, NY
G	5	Kevin Dorsey (I) (redshirt)	6 ft 0 in (1.83 m)	175 lb (79 kg)	So	Clinton Christian School; Minnesota	Waldorf, MD
G	10	Che Bob	6 ft 6 in (1.98 m)	220 lb (100 kg)	Jr	Kennedy Charter; South Plains College	Charlotte, NC
G	11	Prentiss Nixon	6 ft 1 in (1.85 m)	180 lb (82 kg)	So	Bolingbrook HS	Bolingbrook, IL
G	12	Alex Tarkanian (W)	5 ft 11 in (1.8 m)	167 lb (76 kg)	RS Fr	Northwest Career & Technical Academy; UNLV	Las Vegas, NV
G	13	Lorenzo Jenkins (I) (redshirt)	6 ft 7 in (2.01 m)	210 lb (95 kg)	So	First Baptist Academy; Arkansas	Naples, Florida
G	14	Robbie Berwick (I) (redshirt)	6 ft 4 in (1.93 m)	195 lb (88 kg)	Jr	Atascadero HS; Florida State	Atascadero, CA
G	15	Anthony Bonner	6 ft 2 in (1.88 m)	170 lb (77 kg)	RS Fr	Lawrence HS	Lawrence, KS
G	22	J. D. Page	6 ft 3 in (1.91 m)	166 lb (75 kg)	RS So	Rangeview HS	Aurora, CO
F/C	32	Nico Carvacho	6 ft 10 in (2.08 m)	225 lb (102 kg)	RS Fr	Sunrise Christian Academy	Frisco, TX
F/C	33	Braiden Koelliker (W)	6 ft 8 in (2.03 m)	225 lb (102 kg)	So	Davis HS; Snow College	Kaysville, UT

Head coach

- Larry Eustachy (Long Beach State)

Assistant coach(es)

- Steve Barnes (Azusa Pacific)
- Jase Herl (Colorado Mesa)
- Willie Glover (Southern Miss)

Legend

- (C) Team captain
- (S) Suspended
- (I) Ineligible
- (W) Walk-on
- Injured
- Current redshirt

Roster

== Schedule and results ==
Date time, TV	Rank^{#}	Opponent^{#}	Result	Record	Site (attendance) city, state
Exhibition
11/08/2016*; 7:00 pm		Regis	W 75–60		Moby Arena (2,051); Fort Collins, CO
Non-conference regular season
11/13/2016*; 2:00 pm, RTRM		New Mexico State	W 64–61	1–0	Moby Arena (2,264); Fort Collins, CO
11/16/2016*; 7:00 pm		Fort Lewis; California Bears Classic	W 84–75	2–0	Moby Arena (2,253); Fort Collins, CO
11/20/2016*; 4:00 pm, P12N		at Stanford	L 49–56	2–1	Maples Pavilion (4,661); Stanford, CA
11/23/2016*; 12:00 pm		Maryland Eastern Shore; California Bears Classic	W 76–65	3–1	Moby Arena (3,093); Fort Collins, CO
11/25/2016*; 2:00 pm		Southeastern Louisiana; California Bears Classic	W 67–59	4–1	Moby Arena (3,381); Fort Collins, CO
11/27/2016*; 12:00 pm		Alcorn State; California Bears Classic	W 80–58	5–1	Moby Arena (2,023); Fort Collins, CO
11/30/2016*; 7:00 pm, P12N		at Colorado	W 72–58	6–1	Coors Events Center (8,715); Boulder, CO
12/03/2016*; 3:00 pm, CBSSN		Wichita State; MW–MVC Challenge	L 67–82	6–2	Moby Arena (6,918); Fort Collins, CO
12/06/2016*; 7:00 pm		Arkansas–Fort Smith	W 93–69	7–2	Moby Arena (8,745); Fort Collins, CO
12/10/2016*; 2:00 pm		Northern Colorado	W 81–64	8–2	Moby Arena (3,114); Fort Collins, CO
12/17/2016*; 1:00 pm, CBSSN		vs. Kansas State; Denver Showcase	L 70–89	8–3	Pepsi Center (7,318); Denver, CO
12/19/2016*; 7:00 pm		Loyola Marymount	L 66–69	8–4	Moby Arena (2,476); Fort Collins, CO
12/22/2016*; 8:00 pm		at Long Beach State	L 55–56	8–5	Walter Pyramid (2,247); Long Beach, CA
Mountain West regular season
12/28/2016; 9:00 pm, ESPNU		UNLV	W 91–77	9–5 (1–0)	Moby Arena (2,464); Fort Collins, CO
12/31/2016; 4:00 pm, ESPN3		at Boise State	L 73–74	9–6 (1–1)	Taco Bell Arena (5,413); Boise, ID
01/04/2017; 8:00 pm		at San Jose State	W 76–71	10–6 (2–1)	Event Center Arena (1,523); San Jose, CA
01/07/2017; 12:00 pm, RTRM		Air Force	W 85–58	11–6 (3–1)	Moby Arena (3,243); Fort Collins, CO
01/14/2017; 12:00 pm, RTRM		New Mexico	L 71–84	11–7 (3–2)	Moby Arena (3,418); Fort Collins, CO
01/18/2017; 9:00 pm, CBSSN		at Fresno State	L 57–78	11–8 (3–3)	Save Mart Center (6,254); Fresno, CA
01/21/2017; 7:00 pm		at Utah State	W 64–56	12–8 (4–3)	Smith Spectrum (8,854); Logan, UT
01/25/2017; 7:00 pm, RTRM		San Jose State	W 81–72	13–8 (5–3)	Moby Arena (2,753); Fort Collins, CO
01/28/2017; 4:00 pm, CBSSN		at San Diego State	W 78–77	14–8 (6–3)	Viejas Arena (11,881); San Diego, CA
02/01/2017; 7:00 pm, ESPN3		Boise State	L 76–79	14–9 (6–4)	Moby Arena (3,926); Fort Collins, CO
02/04/2017; 4:00 pm, CBSSN		at UNLV	W 69–49	15–9 (7–4)	Thomas & Mack Center (12,434); Paradise, NV
02/07/2017; 7:00 pm, RTRM		Utah State	W 69–52	16–9 (8–4)	Moby Arena (2,763); Fort Collins, CO
02/11/2017; 2:00 pm, ESPN3		Fresno State	W 78–62	17–9 (9–4)	Moby Arena (5,233); Fort Collins, CO
02/14/2017; 7:00 pm, RTRM		at Wyoming; Border War	W 78–73	18–9 (10–4)	Arena-Auditorium (5,812); Laramie, WY
02/21/2017; 8:00 pm, CBSSN		at New Mexico	W 68–56	19–9 (11–4)	The Pit (12,078); Albuquerque, NM
02/25/2017; 6:00 pm, CBSSN		San Diego State	W 56–55	20–9 (12–4)	Moby Arena (7,856); Fort Collins, CO
03/01/2017; 8:00 pm, RTRM		Wyoming; Border War	W 78–76	21–9 (13–4)	Moby Arena (7,883); Fort Collins, CO
03/04/2017; 6:00 pm, ESPN3		at Nevada	L 72–85	21–10 (13–5)	Lawlor Events Center (11,662); Reno, NV
Mountain West tournament
03/09/2016; 7:00 pm, CBSSN	(2)	vs. (10) Air Force; Quarterfinals	W 81–55	22–10	Thomas & Mack Center (5,057); Paradise, NV
03/10/2016; 10:30 pm, CBSSN	(2)	vs. (6) San Diego State; Semifinals	W 71–63	23–10	Thomas & Mack Center (6,211); Paradise, NV
03/11/2016; 4:00 pm, CBS	(2)	vs. (1) Nevada; Championship	L 71–79	23–11	Thomas & Mack Center (5,602); Paradise, NV
NIT
03/14/2017*; 7:00 PM, ESPN3	(4)	(5) College of Charleston; First Round – California Bracket	W 81–74	24–11	Moby Arena (2,836); Fort Collins, CO
03/20/2017*; 9:15 PM, ESPN2	(4)	(8) Cal State Bakersfield; Second Round – California Bracket	L 63–81	24–12	Moby Arena (4,203); Fort Collins, CO
*Non-conference game. ^{#}Rankings from AP Poll. (#) Tournament seedings in parentheses. All times are in Mountain Time Source.
