= 2016–17 UNLV Runnin' Rebels basketball team =

American college basketball season

2016–17 UNLV Runnin' Rebels basketball
- Conference: Mountain West Conference
- Record: 11–21 (4–14 MW)
- Head coach: Marvin Menzies (1st season)
- Assistant coaches: Andre LaFleur; Rob Jeter; Eric Brown
- Home arena: Thomas & Mack Center

2016–17 Mountain West Conference men's basketball standings
	Conf.				Overall
Team	W		L	PCT	W		L	PCT
Nevada †	14	–	4	.778	28	–	7	.800
Colorado State	13	–	5	.722	24	–	12	.667
Boise State	12	–	6	.667	20	–	12	.625
Fresno State	11	–	7	.611	20	–	13	.606
New Mexico	10	–	8	.556	17	–	14	.548
San Diego State	9	–	9	.500	19	–	14	.576
Wyoming	8	–	10	.444	23	–	15	.605
San Jose State	7	–	11	.389	14	–	16	.467
Utah State	7	–	11	.389	14	–	17	.452
Air Force	4	–	14	.222	12	–	21	.364
UNLV	4	–	14	.222	11	–	21	.344
† Conference tournament winner

The 2016–17 UNLV Runnin' Rebels basketball team represented the University of Nevada, Las Vegas during the 2016–17 NCAA Division I men's basketball season. The Runnin' Rebels were led by first-year head coach Marvin Menzies. They played their home games at the Thomas & Mack Center in Paradise, Nevada as members of the Mountain West Conference. They finished the season 11–21, 4–14 in Mountain West play to finish in a tie for tenth place. They lost in the first round of the Mountain West tournament to San Diego State.

== Previous season ==
The 2015–16 Runnin' Rebels finished the 2015–16 season 18–15, 8–10 in Mountain West play to finish in a tie for sixth place. They defeated Air Force to advance to the quarterfinals of the Mountain West tournament, where they lost to Fresno State.

On January 10, 2016, UNLV announced that head coach Dave Rice and the school had mutually agreed for him to step down as head coach. Associate head coach Todd Simon was named interim head coach for the remainder of the season. On March 28, the school announced that Chris Beard had been hired as head coach. However, less than three weeks later, Beard left UNLV to accept the head coaching position at Texas Tech. On April 16, the school hired Mavin Menzies as head coach.

== Departures ==
Name	Number	Pos.	Height	Weight	Year	Hometown	Reason for departure
Ike Nwamu	34	G	6'5"	210	RS senior	Greensboro, NC	Graduated
Jerome Seagears	2	G	6'1"	180	RS senior	Silver Spring, MD	Graduated
Alex Perez	14	G	6'4"	180	Senior	San Diego, CA	Graduated
Daquan Cook	10	G	6'2"	170	Senior	Baltimore, MD	Dismissed from the team due to a DUI
Chris Obekpa	35	C	6'10"	225	Senior	Makurdi, Nigeria	Declared for 2016 NBA draft
Ben Carter	13	F	6'9"	225	RS junior	Las Vegas, NV	Graduate transferred to Michigan State
Patrick McCaw	22	G	6'7"	185	Sophomore	St. Louis, MO	Declared for 2016 NBA draft
Jordan Cornish	3	G	6'6"	220	Sophomore	New Orleans, LA	Transferred to Tulane
Goodluck Okonoboh	11	F/C	6'10"	225	Sophomore	Woburn, MA	Declared for 2016 NBA draft
Derrick Jones Jr.	1	F	6'7"	190	Freshman	Philadelphia, PA	Declared for 2016 NBA draft
Austin Starr	20	G	6'3"	185	Freshman	Las Vegas, NV	Transferred to College of Southern Idaho
Stephen Zimmerman	33	C	7'0"	240	Freshman	Las Vegas, NV	Declared for 2016 NBA draft

=== Incoming transfers ===
Name	Number	Pos.	Height	Weight	Year	Hometown	Notes
Kris Clyburn	1	G	6'3"	170	Sophomore	Romulus, MI	Junior college transferred from Ranger College
Uche Ofoegbu	2	F	6'4"	214	RS senior	San Antonio, TX	Transferred from San Francisco. Was eligible to play immediately since he graduated from San Francisco.
Christian Jones	20	F	6'7"	230	RS senior	Arlington, TX	Transferred from St. John's. Was eligible to play immediately since he graduated from St. John's.
Jordan Johnson	24	G	5'9"	175	Senior	Waukegan, IL	Transferred from Milwaukee. Under NCAA transfer rules, Johnson had to sit out for the 2016–17 season. Had one year of remaining eligibility.
Jovan Mooring	30	G	6'2"	205	Junior	Chicago, IL	Junior college transferred from South Suburban College

== 2016 recruiting class ==
College recruiting
Name	Hometown	School	Height	Weight	Commit date
Cheickna Dembele #18 C	Mali	Scotland Performance Institute	6 ft 10 in (2.08 m)	235 lb (107 kg)	Apr 30, 2016
Cheickna Dembele #18 C	Recruit ratings: Scout: Rivals: 247Sports: ESPN:				
Ben Coupet Jr. #39 SF	Chicago, IL	Simeon Career Academy	6 ft 7 in (2.01 m)	185 lb (84 kg)	May 9, 2016
Ben Coupet Jr. #39 SF	Recruit ratings: Scout: Rivals: 247Sports: ESPN:				
Zion Morgan; SG	Chicago, IL	Kenwood Academy High School	6 ft 4 in (1.93 m)	180 lb (82 kg)	May 12, 2016
Zion Morgan; SG	Recruit ratings: Scout: Rivals: 247Sports: ESPN:				
Jaylan Ballou; PG	Santa Fe Springs, CA	Saint Paul High School	6 ft 1 in (1.85 m)	180 lb (82 kg)	Jun 1, 2016
Jaylan Ballou; PG	Recruit ratings: Scout: Rivals: 247Sports: ESPN:				
Djordjije Sljivancanin; C	Belgrade, Serbia	IMG Academy	6 ft 11 in (2.11 m)	250 lb (110 kg)	May 18, 2016
Djordjije Sljivancanin; C	Recruit ratings: Scout: Rivals: 247Sports: ESPN:				
Overall recruit ranking:
Note: In many cases, Scout, Rivals, 247Sports, On3, and ESPN may conflict in their listings of height and weight.; In these cases, the average was taken. ESPN grades are on a 100-point scale.; Sources: "2016 UNLV Basketball Commitments". Rivals.; "2016 UNLV Player Commits". ESPN.; "2016 Team Ranking". Rivals.

== Roster ==
2016–17 UNLV Runnin' Rebels men's basketball team
Players
Coaches

Pos.	#	Name	Height	Weight	Year	Previous school	Hometown
G	0	Larry Bush (W)	6 ft 2 in (1.88 m)	165 lb (75 kg)	Jr	Moorpark College	Calabasas, CA
G	1	Kris Clyburn	6 ft 6 in (1.98 m)	170 lb (77 kg)	So	Ranger College	Romulus, MI
F	2	Uche Ofoegbu	6 ft 4 in (1.93 m)	220 lb (100 kg)	RS Sr	San Francisco	Chicago, IL
F	3	Tyrell Green	6 ft 7 in (2.01 m)	215 lb (98 kg)	Sr	Hill College	Toronto, ON
G	5	Jaylen Poyser	6 ft 4 in (1.93 m)	180 lb (82 kg)	So	Athlete Institute Basketball Academy	Malton, ON
G	10	Zion Morgan	6 ft 5 in (1.96 m)	180 lb (82 kg)	Fr	Kenwood Academy	Chicago, IL
F	11	Cheickna Dembélé	6 ft 11 in (2.11 m)	235 lb (107 kg)	Fr	Scotland Performance Institute	Mali, Africa
C	12	Djordjije Sljivancanin	6 ft 10 in (2.08 m)	230 lb (104 kg)	Fr	IMG Academy	Belgrade, Serbia
G	13	Ben Coupet Jr.	6 ft 7 in (2.01 m)	180 lb (82 kg)	Fr	Simeon Career Academy	Chicago, IL
F	15	Dwayne Morgan	6 ft 8 in (2.03 m)	215 lb (98 kg)	Jr	St. Frances Academy	Baltimore, MD
F	20	Christian Jones	6 ft 7 in (2.01 m)	225 lb (102 kg)	RS Sr	St. John's	Arlington, TX
G	22	Jaylan Ballou	6 ft 0 in (1.83 m)	175 lb (79 kg)	Fr	St. Paul HS	Santa Fe Springs, CA
G	24	Jordan Johnson (I) (redshirt)	5 ft 11 in (1.8 m)	175 lb (79 kg)	Sr	Wisconsin–Milwaukee	Waukegan, IL
G	30	Jovan Mooring	6 ft 2 in (1.88 m)	205 lb (93 kg)	Jr	South Suburban College	Country Club Hills, IL
F	31	Troy Baxter Jr.	6 ft 8 in (2.03 m)	190 lb (86 kg)	Fr	Oldsmar Christian HS	Tallahassee, FL

Head coach

- Marvin Menzies (UCLA)

Assistant coach(es)

- Andre LaFleur (Northeastern)
- Rob Jeter (UW–Platteville)
- Eric Brown (Cal State Fullerton)

Legend

- (C) Team captain
- (S) Suspended
- (I) Ineligible
- (W) Walk-on
- Injured
- Current redshirt

Roster

== Schedule and results ==
Date time, TV	Rank^{#}	Opponent^{#}	Result	Record	Site (attendance) city, state
Exhibition
11/01/2016*; 7:00 pm		Dakota Wesleyan	W 96–80		Thomas & Mack Center; Paradise, NV
11/05/2016*; 7:00 pm		New Mexico Highlands	W 92–66		Thomas & Mack Center; Paradise, NV
Non-conference regular season
11/11/2016*; 7:00 pm		South Alabama	L 68–76	0–1	Thomas & Mack Center (9,981); Paradise, NV
11/16/2016*; 7:00 pm		UC Riverside	W 74–62	1–1	Thomas & Mack Center (8,711); Paradise, NV
11/19/2016*; 7:00 pm		Cal State Fullerton; Global Sports Classic	W 77–68	2–1	Thomas & Mack Center (9,416); Paradise, NV
11/22/2016*; 7:00 pm		Northern Arizona; Global Sports Classic	W 110–71	3–1	Thomas & Mack Center (8,822); Paradise, NV
11/25/2016*; 7:30 pm		TCU; Global Sports Classic semifinals	L 59–63	3–2	Thomas & Mack Center (9,815); Paradise, NV
11/26/2016*; 5:00 pm		WKU; Global Sports Classic 3rd place game	W 71–61	4–2	Thomas & Mack Center (8,810); Paradise, NV
11/30/2016*; 6:00 pm		at Southern Utah	W 89–81	5–2	Centrum Arena (4,249); Cedar City, UT
12/03/2016*; 5:00 pm, P12N		at Arizona State	L 73–97	5–3	Wells Fargo Arena (7,707); Tempe, AZ
12/10/2016*; 2:15 pm, ESPN		vs. No. 5 Duke; T-Mobile Arena Showcase	L 45–94	5–4	T-Mobile Arena (19,107); Paradise, NV
12/14/2016*; 7:00 pm		Incarnate Word	W 92–64	6–4	Thomas & Mack Center (8,202); Paradise, NV
12/17/2016*; 7:00 pm, ESPN2		vs. No. 22 Oregon; Portland Showcase	L 63–83	6–5	Moda Center (9,728); Portland, OR
12/19/2016*; 7:00 pm		Southern Illinois; MW–MVC Challenge	W 68–61	7–5	Thomas & Mack Center (11,758); Paradise, NV
12/22/2016*; 6:00 pm, CBSSN		No. 3 Kansas	L 53–71	7–6	Thomas & Mack Center (14,116); Paradise, NV
Mountain West regular season
12/28/2016; 8:00 pm, ESPNU		at Colorado State	L 77–91	7–7 (0–1)	Moby Arena (2,464); Fort Collins, CO
12/31/2016; 1:00 pm		Wyoming	W 81–75	8–7 (1–1)	Thomas & Mack Center (9,352); Paradise, NV
01/04/2017; 8:00 pm, CBSSN		Boise State	L 59–77	8–8 (1–2)	Thomas & Mack Center (8,872); Paradise, NV
01/07/2017; 3:00 pm, CBSSN		at Utah State	L 63–79	8–9 (1–3)	Smith Spectrum (6,080); Logan, UT
01/10/2017; 6:00 pm, ESPN3		at New Mexico	W 71–66	9–9 (2–3)	The Pit (11,379); Albuquerque, NM
01/17/2017; 7:00 pm, ESPN3		San Diego State	L 51–64	9–10 (2–4)	Thomas & Mack Center (10,007); Paradise, NV
01/21/2017; 3:00 pm, RTRM		Air Force	W 87–85 ^{2OT}	10–10 (3–4)	Thomas & Mack Center (9,917); Paradise, NV
01/25/2017; 6:00 pm		at Wyoming	L 65–66	10–11 (3–5)	Arena-Auditorium (5,019); Laramie, WY
01/28/2017; 7:00 pm		at San Jose State	L 72–76	10–12 (3–6)	Event Center Arena (2,106); San Jose, CA
02/01/2017; 8:00 pm, CBSSN		New Mexico	L 77–80	10–13 (3–7)	Thomas & Mack Center (12,001); Paradise, NV
02/04/2017; 3:00 pm, CBSSN		Colorado State	L 49–69	10–14 (3–8)	Thomas & Mack Center (12,434); Paradise, NV
02/08/2017; 8:00 pm, CBSSN		at Nevada	L 77–104	10–15 (3–9)	Lawlor Events Center (11,841); Reno, NV
02/11/2017; 3:00 pm		San Jose State	L 74–76	10–16 (3–10)	Thomas & Mack Center (10,349); Paradise, NV
02/19/2017; 7:00 pm, CBSSN		at San Diego State	L 64–77	10–17 (3–11)	Viejas Arena (11,896); San Diego, CA
02/22/2017; 6:00 pm		at Air Force	L 58–81	10–18 (3–12)	Clune Arena (2,031); Colorado Springs, CO
02/25/2017; 3:00 pm, CBSSN		Nevada	L 58–94	10–19 (3–13)	Thomas & Mack Center (14,808); Paradise, NV
03/01/2017; 8:00 pm, ESPNU		Utah State	W 66–59	11–19 (4–13)	Thomas & Mack Center (9,931); Paradise, NV
03/04/2017; 4:00 pm, ESPN3		at Fresno State	L 59–72	11–20 (4–14)	Save Mart Center (8,236); Fresno, CA
Mountain West tournament
03/08/2017; 4:00 pm, MW Net	(11)	(6) San Diego State; First round	L 52–62 ^{OT}	11–21	Thomas & Mack Center (4,979); Paradise, NV
*Non-conference game. ^{#}Rankings from AP Poll. (#) Tournament seedings in parentheses. All times are in Pacific Time.
