= 2016–17 Fresno State Bulldogs men's basketball team =

American college basketball season

2016–17 Fresno State Bulldogs men's basketball

NIT, First round
- Conference: Mountain West Conference
- Record: 20–13 (11–7 MW)
- Head coach: Rodney Terry (6th season)
- Assistant coaches: Jerry Wainwright; Byron Jones; Kenton Paulino
- Home arena: Save Mart Center

2016–17 Mountain West Conference men's basketball standings
	Conf.				Overall
Team	W		L	PCT	W		L	PCT
Nevada †	14	–	4	.778	28	–	7	.800
Colorado State	13	–	5	.722	24	–	12	.667
Boise State	12	–	6	.667	20	–	12	.625
Fresno State	11	–	7	.611	20	–	13	.606
New Mexico	10	–	8	.556	17	–	14	.548
San Diego State	9	–	9	.500	19	–	14	.576
Wyoming	8	–	10	.444	23	–	15	.605
San Jose State	7	–	11	.389	14	–	16	.467
Utah State	7	–	11	.389	14	–	17	.452
Air Force	4	–	14	.222	12	–	21	.364
UNLV	4	–	14	.222	11	–	21	.344
† Conference tournament winner

The 2016–17 Fresno State Bulldogs men's basketball team represented California State University, Fresno during the 2016–17 NCAA Division I men's basketball season. This was head coach Rodney Terry's sixth season at Fresno State. The Bulldogs played their home games at Save Mart Center as members of the Mountain West Conference. They finished the season 20–13, 11–7 in Mountain West play to finish in fourth place. They defeated New Mexico in the quarterfinals of the Mountain West tournament to advance to the semifinals where they lost to Nevada. They were invited National Invitation Tournament where they lost in the first round to TCU.

== Previous season ==
The Bulldogs finished the 2015–16 season 25–10, 13–5 in Mountain West play to finish in second place. They defeated UNLV, Colorado State, and San Diego State to win the Mountain West tournament. As a result, they earned the conference's automatic bid to the NCAA tournament where they received a No. 14 seed and lost in the First round to Utah.

== Departures ==
Name	Number	Pos.	Height	Weight	Year	Hometown	Notes
Julien Lewis	0	G	6'4"	195	RS Senior	Galveston, TX	Graduated
Cezar Guerrero	12	G	6'1"	185	RS Senior	Huntington Park, CA	Graduated
Lionel Ellison III	15	G	6'2"	195	Junior	New Orleans, LA	Graduate transferred to William Penn
Marvelle Harris	23	G	6'4"	210	Senior	Rialto, CA	Graduated
Torren Jones	24	F	6'9"	235	Junior	Chandler, AZ	Dismissed from team for violation of team rules

=== Incoming transfers ===
Name	Number	Pos.	Height	Weight	Year	Hometown	Notes
Jacob Holland	24	G	6'4"	180	Junior	Los Lunas, NM	Junior college transferred from Otero Junior College

== Recruiting Class of 2016 ==
College recruiting information
Name	Hometown	School	Height	Weight	Commit date
Johnny McWilliams #67 SG	San Marcos, CA	San Marcos High School	6 ft 4 in (1.93 m)	175 lb (79 kg)	Oct 14, 2015
Johnny McWilliams #67 SG	Recruit ratings: Scout: Rivals: (69)				
Bryson Williams #77 PF	Fresno, CA	Roosevelt High School	6 ft 6 in (1.98 m)	180 lb (82 kg)	Feb 10, 2014
Bryson Williams #77 PF	Recruit ratings: Scout: Rivals: (73)				
William McDowell-White; PG	Brisbane, Australia	Wishart State School	6 ft 5 in (1.96 m)	185 lb (84 kg)	Apr 21, 2016
William McDowell-White; PG	Recruit ratings: Scout: Rivals: (NR)				
Lazaro Rojas; PF	São José dos Campos, Brazil	Score Sports Academy	6 ft 11 in (2.11 m)	235 lb (107 kg)	Apr 18, 2016
Lazaro Rojas; PF	Recruit ratings: Scout: Rivals: (NR)				
Darryl McDowell-White; SG	Brisbane, Australia	Wishart State School	6 ft 0 in (1.83 m)	N/A	Jan 29, 2016
Darryl McDowell-White; SG	Recruit ratings: Scout: Rivals: (NR)				
Overall recruit ranking: Scout: – Rivals: –
Note: In many cases, Scout, Rivals, 247Sports, On3, and ESPN may conflict in their listings of height and weight.; In these cases, the average was taken. ESPN grades are on a 100-point scale.; Sources: "Fresno State Commit List for 2016". Rivals.; "Men's Basketball Recruiting". Scout.; "ESPN – Fresno State Bulldogs Basketball Recruiting 2016". ESPN.; "Scout.com Team Recruiting Rankings". Scout.; "2016 Team Ranking". Rivals.

== Roster ==
2016–17 Fresno State Bulldogs men's basketball team
Players
Coaches

Pos.	#	Name	Height	Weight	Year	Previous school	Hometown
G	0	Darryl McDowell-White	6 ft 1 in (1.85 m)	175 lb (79 kg)	Fr	Wishart State School	Brisbane, Australia
G	1	Jaron Hopkins	6 ft 6 in (1.98 m)	205 lb (93 kg)	RS Jr	Dobson HS; Colorado	Mesa, AZ
G	2	William McDowell-White	6 ft 5 in (1.96 m)	185 lb (84 kg)	Fr	Wishart State School	Brisbane, Australia
G/F	3	Paul Watson	6 ft 7 in (2.01 m)	210 lb (95 kg)	Sr	Paradise Valley HS	Phoenix, AZ
F	4	Karachi Edo	6 ft 6 in (1.98 m)	230 lb (104 kg)	Sr	Berkner HS	Richardson, TX
G	5	Jahmel Taylor	5 ft 11 in (1.8 m)	175 lb (79 kg)	RS Jr	Pacific Hills School; Washington	Los Angeles, CA
G	10	Johnny McWilliams	6 ft 9 in (2.06 m)	195 lb (88 kg)	Fr	San Marcos HS	San Marcos, CA
F	11	Bryson Williams	6 ft 8 in (2.03 m)	225 lb (102 kg)	Fr	Roosevelt HS	Fresno, CA
F	13	Cullen Russo	6 ft 9 in (2.06 m)	225 lb (102 kg)	Sr	Southern Tech Academy; New Mexico JC	Bloomington, MN
G	14	Ryan Beddeo	6 ft 2 in (1.88 m)	185 lb (84 kg)	Fr	Brewster Academy	Valencia, CA
G	15	Grant Shell (W)	6 ft 3 in (1.91 m)	175 lb (79 kg)	So	Burlington HS	Burlington, KS
G	20	Sam Bittner (W)	6 ft 6 in (1.98 m)	195 lb (88 kg)	So	Trinity International HS	Las Vegas, NV
G	21	Deshon Taylor	6 ft 1 in (1.85 m)	175 lb (79 kg)	RS So	John W. North HS; UMKC	Riverside, CA
G	22	Ountae Campbell (W)	6 ft 4 in (1.93 m)	195 lb (88 kg)	So	Brentwood HS	Los Angeles, CA
G	24	Jacob Holland	6 ft 4 in (1.93 m)	195 lb (88 kg)	Jr	Los Lunas HS; Otero JC	Los Lunas, NM
F	32	Nate Grimes	6 ft 8 in (2.03 m)	200 lb (91 kg)	RS Fr	Quality Education Academy	Las Vegas, NV
C	34	Terrell Carter II	6 ft 9 in (2.06 m)	275 lb (125 kg)	Jr	Redondo Union HS	Redondo Beach, CA
F/C	35	Lázaro Rojas	6 ft 11 in (2.11 m)	235 lb (107 kg)	Fr	Score Academy	São José dos Campos, Brazil

Head coach

- Rodney Terry (St. Edward's)

Assistant coach(es)

- Jerry Wainwright (Colorado College)
- Byron Jones (Central Oklahoma)
- Kenton Paulino (Texas)

Legend

- (C) Team captain
- (S) Suspended
- (I) Ineligible
- (W) Walk-on
- Injured
- Current redshirt

Roster

== Schedule and results ==
Date time, TV	Rank^{#}	Opponent^{#}	Result	Record	Site (attendance) city, state
Exhibition
11/01/2016*; 7:00 pm		Cal State San Bernardino	W 76–69		Save Mart Center (5,012); Fresno, CA
Non-conference regular season
11/11/2016*; 7:00 pm		UTSA	W 69–66	1–0	Save Mart Center (6,088); Fresno, CA
11/14/2016*; 7:00 pm		Prairie View A&M	L 78–84	1–1	Save Mart Center (6,036); Fresno, CA
11/19/2016*; 11:00 am		Lamar	W 83–64	2–1	Save Mart Center (5,269); Fresno, CA
11/22/2016*; 7:00 pm		at Cal State Bakesfield	L 63–71	2–2	Icardo Center (3,497); Bakersfield, CA
11/25/2016*; 6:00 pm, P12N		at Oregon State	W 63–58	3–2	Gill Coliseum (5,005); Corvallis, OR
11/29/2016*; 7:00 pm		Menlo	W 80–67	4–2	Save Mart Center (5,147); Fresno, CA
12/03/2016*; 12:00 pm		at Drake; MW–MVC Challenge	W 78–76 ^{OT}	5–2	Knapp Center (2,633); Des Moines, IA
12/06/2016*; 4:30 pm, CBSSN		at Marquette	L 81–84	5–3	BMO Harris Bradley Center (11,550); Milwaukee, WI
12/10/2016*; 4:00 pm		Cal Poly	W 73–59	6–3	Save Mart Center (7,250); Fresno, CA
12/14/2016*; 7:00 pm		Holy Names	W 88–54	7–3	Save Mart Center (5,304); Fresno, CA
12/17/2016*; 7:00 pm		at Pacific	W 70–68 ^{OT}	8–3	Alex G. Spanos Center (2,051); Stockton, CA
12/20/2016*; 8:00 pm, P12N		at No. 20 Oregon	L 63–75	8–4	Matthew Knight Arena (7,169); Eugene, OR
Mountain West regular season
12/28/2016; 6:00 pm, ESPN3		at New Mexico	L 73–78	8–5 (0–1)	The Pit (11,844); Albuquerque, NM
12/31/2016; 4:00 pm, ESPN3		Nevada	W 77–76	9–5 (1–1)	Save Mart Center (6,043); Fresno, CA
01/04/2017; 7:00 pm		Wyoming	W 85–70	10–5 (2–1)	Save Mart Center (6,437); Fresno, CA
01/07/2017; 2:00 pm		at San Jose State	L 62–69	10–6 (2–2)	Event Center Arena (1,721); San Jose, CA
01/11/2017; 6:00 pm		at Air Force	L 72–81	10–7 (2–3)	Clune Arena (1,232); Colorado Springs, CO
01/14/2017; 4:00 pm		Boise State	W 89–80	11–7 (3–3)	Save Mart Center (6,978); Fresno, CA
01/18/2017; 8:00 pm, CBSSN		Colorado State	W 78–57	12–7 (4–3)	Save Mart Center (6,254); Fresno, CA
01/21/2017; 3:00 pm, CBSSN		at Nevada	W 81–76	13–7 (5–3)	Lawlor Events Center (10,236); Reno, NV
01/28/2017; 6:00 pm		at Utah State	L 65–78	13–8 (5–4)	Smith Spectrum (6,835); Logan, UT
02/01/2017; 7:00 pm, RTRM		Air Force	W 73–64	14–8 (6–4)	Save Mart Center (6,145); Fresno, CA
02/04/2017; 4:00 pm, ESPN3		San Diego State	L 67–70	14–9 (6–5)	Save Mart Center (8,882); Fresno, CA
02/08/2017; 7:00 pm		at Wyoming	L 100–102 ^{4OT}	14–10 (6–6)	Arena-Auditorium (4,156); Laramie, WY
02/11/2017; 1:00 pm, ESPN3		at Colorado State	L 62–78	14–11 (6–7)	Moby Arena (5,233); Fort Collins, CO
02/15/2017; 7:00 pm		San Jose State	W 77–59	15–11 (7–7)	Save Mart Center (5,914); Fresno, CA
02/18/2017; 3:00 pm, CBSSN		New Mexico	W 71–61	16–11 (8–7)	Save Mart Center (8,807); Fresno, CA
02/22/2017; 8:00 pm, CBSSN		at San Diego State	W 63–55	17–11 (9–7)	Viejas Arena (12,029); San Diego, CA
02/28/2017; 7:00 pm, CBSSN		at Boise State	W 74–67	18–11 (10–7)	Taco Bell Arena (5,804); Boise, ID
03/04/2017; 4:00 pm, ESPN3		UNLV	W 72–59	19–11 (11–7)	Save Mart Center (8,236); Fresno, CA
Mountain West tournament
03/09/2017; 2:30 pm, CBSSN	(4)	vs. (5) New Mexico; Quarterfinals	W 65–60	20–11	Thomas & Mack Center (5,866); Paradise, NV
03/10/2017; 7:00 pm, CBSSN	(4)	vs. (1) Nevada; Semifinals	L 72–83	20–12	Thomas & Mack Center (6,211); Paradise, NV
NIT
03/15/2017*; 5:00 pm, ESPN3	(5)	at (4) TCU; First round – Iowa bracket	L 59–66	20–13	Schollmaier Arena (4,271); Fort Worth, TX
*Non-conference game. ^{#}Rankings from AP Poll. (#) Tournament seedings in parentheses. All times are in Pacific Time Source.

== See also ==
- 2016–17 Fresno State Bulldogs women's basketball team
