= 2016–17 New Mexico Lobos men's basketball team =

American college basketball season

2016–17 New Mexico Lobos men's basketball
- Conference: Mountain West Conference
- Record: 17–14 (10–8 MW)
- Head coach: Craig Neal (4th season)
- Assistant coaches: Chris Harriman; Alan Huss; Terrence Rencher
- Home arena: The Pit

2016–17 Mountain West Conference men's basketball standings
	Conf.				Overall
Team	W		L	PCT	W		L	PCT
Nevada †	14	–	4	.778	28	–	7	.800
Colorado State	13	–	5	.722	24	–	12	.667
Boise State	12	–	6	.667	20	–	12	.625
Fresno State	11	–	7	.611	20	–	13	.606
New Mexico	10	–	8	.556	17	–	14	.548
San Diego State	9	–	9	.500	19	–	14	.576
Wyoming	8	–	10	.444	23	–	15	.605
San Jose State	7	–	11	.389	14	–	16	.467
Utah State	7	–	11	.389	14	–	17	.452
Air Force	4	–	14	.222	12	–	21	.364
UNLV	4	–	14	.222	11	–	21	.344
† Conference tournament winner

The 2016–17 New Mexico Lobos men's basketball team represented the University of New Mexico during the 2016–17 NCAA Division I men's basketball season as a member of the Mountain West Conference. They played their home games at The Pit in Albuquerque, New Mexico. The Lobos were led by fourth-year head coach Craig Neal. They finished the season 17–14, 10–8 in Mountain West play to finish in fifth place. They lost in the quarterfinals of the Mountain West tournament to Fresno State.

On March 31, 2017, head coach Craig Neal was fired after 4 seasons with the Lobos, 3 weeks after New Mexico Athletic Director Paul Krebs had stated that Neal would return next season. The school then hired Paul Weir from their in-state rival New Mexico State as the new head coach on April 11.

== Previous season ==
The Lobos finished the 2015–16 season 17–15, 10–8 in Mountain West play to finish in a tie for fourth place. They lost in the quarterfinals of the Mountain West tournament to Nevada.

== Offseason ==
=== Departures ===
Name	Number	Pos.	Height	Weight	Year	Hometown	Notes
J. J. N'Ganga	0	F	6'10"	240	Senior	Aubervilliers, France	Graduate transferred to Mercer
Cullen Neal	1	G	6'5"	195	RS Sophomore	Albuquerque, NM	Graduated. Transferred to Ole Miss
Devon Williams	12	G/F	6'8"	210	RS Junior	Dallas, TX	Career ending spinal injury. Became a graduate assistant
Tim Jacobs	25	G	6'0"	200	Senior	Las Cruces, NM	Graduated
Nikola Scekic	33	C	7'1"	255	Freshman	Belgrade, Serbia	Transferred to Hutchinson CC
Michael Nesbitt	34	F	6'7"	220	RS Senior	Evansville, IN	Graduated. Became graduate assistant.

=== Incoming transfers ===
Name	Number	Pos.	Height	Weight	Year	Hometown	Notes
Connor MacDougall	55	F	6'9"	240	Junior	Phoenix, AZ	Junior college transferred from South Mountain Community College

=== 2016 recruiting class ===
College recruiting information
Name	Hometown	School	Height	Weight	Commit date
Damien Jefferson #40 SF	East Chicago, IN	East Chicago Central High School	6 ft 5 in (1.96 m)	180 lb (82 kg)	Sep 19, 2015
Damien Jefferson #40 SF	Recruit ratings: Scout: Rivals: 247Sports: ESPN: (76)				
Jalen Harris; PG	Wilson, NC	Word of God Christian Academy	6 ft 1 in (1.85 m)	160 lb (73 kg)	Apr 10, 2016
Jalen Harris; PG	Recruit ratings: Scout: Rivals: 247Sports: ESPN: (NR)				
Aher Uguak; SF	Edmonton, AB	Harry Ainlay High School	6 ft 7 in (2.01 m)	N/A	Oct 21, 2015
Aher Uguak; SF	Recruit ratings: Scout: Rivals: 247Sports: ESPN: (NR)				
Overall recruit ranking:
Note: In many cases, Scout, Rivals, 247Sports, On3, and ESPN may conflict in their listings of height and weight.; In these cases, the average was taken. ESPN grades are on a 100-point scale.; Sources: "2016 New Mexico Basketball Commits". ESPN.

== Roster ==
2016–17 New Mexico Lobos men's basketball team
Players
Coaches

Pos.	#	Name	Height	Weight	Year	Previous school	Hometown
G/F	1	Aher Uguak	6 ft 7 in (2.01 m)	206 lb (93 kg)	Fr	Harry Ainlay High School	Edmonton, Canada
G	3	Jordan Hunter	5 ft 11 in (1.8 m)	180 lb (82 kg)	So	Clifton J. Ozen High School	Beaumont, Texas
G	4	Elijah Brown	6 ft 4 in (1.93 m)	200 lb (91 kg)	RS Jr	Butler	Orange County, California
G	5	Jalen Harris	6 ft 2 in (1.88 m)	156 lb (71 kg)	Fr	Word of God Christian Academy	Wilson, North Carolina
C	11	Obij Aget	7 ft 1 in (2.16 m)	220 lb (100 kg)	Sr	La Lumiere School	Juba, South Sudan
G/F	14	Dane Kuiper	6 ft 7 in (2.01 m)	200 lb (91 kg)	So	Corona del Sol High School	Wasilla, Alaska
G/F	20	Sam Logwood	6 ft 7 in (2.01 m)	210 lb (95 kg)	Jr	La Lumiere School	Indianapolis, Indiana
G	21	Xavier Adams	6 ft 4 in (1.93 m)	205 lb (93 kg)	Jr	Edward S. Marcus High School	Flower Mound, Texas
F	22	Holt Shelley (W)	6 ft 9 in (2.06 m)	221 lb (100 kg)	Fr	Cliff High School	Cliff, New Mexico
F	23	Joe Furstinger	6 ft 9 in (2.06 m)	215 lb (98 kg)	Jr	Santa Margarita Catholic High School	Rancho Santa Margarita, California
G/F	24	Damien Jefferson	6 ft 5 in (1.96 m)	190 lb (86 kg)	Fr	Central High School	East Chicago, Indiana
G	30	Adam Cumber (W)	6 ft 2 in (1.88 m)	185 lb (84 kg)	RS So	Sandia High School	Albuquerque, New Mexico
G	31	Anthony Mathis	6 ft 3 in (1.91 m)	170 lb (77 kg)	So	West Linn High School	West Linn, Oregon
F	32	Tim Williams	6 ft 8 in (2.03 m)	240 lb (109 kg)	RS Sr	Samford	Flossmoor, Illinois
F	55	Connor MacDougall	6 ft 9 in (2.06 m)	235 lb (107 kg)	RS So	South Mountain Community College	Tempe, Arizona

Head coach

- Craig Neal (Georgia Tech)

Assistant coach(es)

- Chris Harriman (Augusta State)
- Alan Huss (Creighton)
- Terrence Rencher (Texas)

Legend

- (C) Team captain
- (S) Suspended
- (I) Ineligible
- (W) Walk-on
- Injured
- Current redshirt

Roster

== Schedule ==
Date time, TV	Rank^{#}	Opponent^{#}	Result	Record	Site (attendance) city, state
Exhibition
Nov 2*; 7:00 pm		Western New Mexico	W 113–57		The Pit (9,587); Albuquerque, NM
Nov 4*; 7:00 pm		Eastern New Mexico	W 88–66		The Pit (10,283); Albuquerque, NM
Non-conference regular season
Nov 11*; 8:00 pm, RTRM		Idaho State	W 81–70	1–0	The Pit (11,293); Albuquerque, NM
Nov 14*; 7:00 pm, RTRM		Houston Baptist	W 95–79	2–0	The Pit (11,666); Albuquerque, NM
Nov 18*; 7:00 pm, ESPN3		New Mexico State; Rio Grande Rivalry	W 72–59	3–0	The Pit (13,892); Albuquerque, NM
Nov 24*; 2:30 pm, ESPN		vs. Virginia Tech; Wooden Legacy quarterfinals	L 72–92	3–1	Titan Gym; Fullerton, CA
Nov 25*; 1:00 pm, ESPNU		vs. Cal State Northridge; Wooden Legacy 2nd round consolation	W 105–89	4–1	Titan Gym; Fullerton, CA
Nov 27*; 12:00 pm, ESPNU		vs. Dayton; Wooden Legacy 5th place game	L 57–64	4–2	Honda Center; Anaheim, CA
Nov 30*; 7:00 pm, RTRM		Abilene Christian	W 64–55	5–2	The Pit (11,154); Albuquerque, NM
Dec 3*; 6:00 pm, ESPN3		at Illinois State; MWC–MVC Challenge	L 74–79	5–3	Redbird Arena (6,056); Normal, IL
Dec 7*; 7:00 pm, RTRM		UTEP	W 78–77	6–3	The Pit (11,838); Albuquerque, NM
Dec 10*; 7:30 pm, ESPN3		at New Mexico State; Rio Grande Rivalry	L 71–84	6–4	Pan American Center (6,298); Las Cruces, NM
Dec 17*; 6:00 pm, RTRM		Arkansas–Pine Bluff	W 83–43	7–4	The Pit (10,404); Albuquerque, NM
Dec 20*; 7:00 pm, P12N		at No. 18 Arizona	L 46–77	7–5	McKale Center (14,008); Tucson, AZ
Mountain West regular season
Dec 28; 7:00 pm, ESPN3		Fresno State	W 78–73	8–5 (2–0)	The Pit (11,844); Albuquerque, NM
Jan 1; 3:00 pm, CBSSN		at San Diego State	W 68–62	9–5 (2–0)	Viejas Arena (12,414); San Diego, CA
Jan 4; 9:00 pm, ESPNU		at Utah State	L 75–79	9–6 (2–1)	Smith Spectrum (3,897); Logan, UT
Jan 7; 9:15 pm, ESPN2		Nevada	L 104–105 ^{OT}	9–7 (2–2)	The Pit (11,235); Albuquerque, NM
Jan 10; 7:00 pm, ESPN3		UNLV	L 66–71	9–8 (2–3)	The Pit (11,379); Albuquerque, NM
Jan 14; 12:00 pm, RTRM		at Colorado State	W 84–71	10–8 (3–3)	Moby Arena (3,418); Fort Collins, CO
Jan 17; 9:00 pm, ESPNU		at Boise State	W 81–70	11–8 (4–3)	Taco Bell Arena (3,752); Boise, ID
Jan 21; 6:00 pm, CBSSN		Wyoming	W 78–71	12–8 (5–3)	The Pit (12,501); Albuquerque, NM
Jan 24; 9:00 pm, ESPNU		Utah State	W 74–61	13–8 (6–3)	The Pit (10,698); Albuquerque, NM
Jan 28; 2:00 pm, CBSSN		at Nevada	L 65–82	13–9 (6–4)	Lawlor Events Center (10,727); Reno, NV
Feb 1; 9:00 pm, CBSSN		at UNLV	W 80–77	14–9 (7–4)	Thomas & Mack Center (12,001); Paradise, NV
Feb 4; 4:00 pm, RTRM		San Jose State	L 68–78	14–10 (7–5)	The Pit (12,731); Albuquerque, NM
Feb 8; 7:00 pm, RTRM		at Air Force	W 74–67	15–10 (8–5)	Clune Arena (2,125); Colorado Springs, CO
Feb 14; 8:00 pm, CBSSN		Boise State	W 78–73	16–10 (9–5)	The Pit (11,071); Albuquerque, NM
Feb 18; 4:00 pm, CBSSN		at Fresno State	L 61–71	16–11 (9–6)	Save Mart Center (8,807); Fresno, CA
Feb 21; 8:00 pm, CBSSN		Colorado State	L 56–68	16–12 (9–7)	The Pit (12,078); Albuquerque, NM
Feb 25; 4:00 pm, CBSSN		at Wyoming	L 71–82	16–13 (9–8)	Arena-Auditorium (5,354); Laramie, WY
Mar 4; 8:00 pm, CBSSN		San Diego State	W 64–59	17–13 (10–8)	The Pit (13,958); Albuquerque, NM
Mountain West tournament
Mar 9; 3:30 pm, CBSSN	(5)	vs. (4) Fresno State; Quarterfinals	L 60–65	17–14	Thomas & Mack Center (5,866); Paradise, NV
*Non-conference game. ^{#}Rankings from AP poll. (#) Tournament seedings in parentheses. All times are in Mountain Time.
