= 2016–17 Boise State Broncos men's basketball team =

American college basketball season

2016–17 Boise State Broncos men's basketball

NIT, Second Round
- Conference: Mountain West Conference
- Record: 20–12 (12–6 MW)
- Head coach: Leon Rice (7th season)
- Assistant coaches: John Rillie; Phil Beckner; Mike Burns
- Home arena: Taco Bell Arena

2016–17 Mountain West Conference men's basketball standings
	Conf.				Overall
Team	W		L	PCT	W		L	PCT
Nevada †	14	–	4	.778	28	–	7	.800
Colorado State	13	–	5	.722	24	–	12	.667
Boise State	12	–	6	.667	20	–	12	.625
Fresno State	11	–	7	.611	20	–	13	.606
New Mexico	10	–	8	.556	17	–	14	.548
San Diego State	9	–	9	.500	19	–	14	.576
Wyoming	8	–	10	.444	23	–	15	.605
San Jose State	7	–	11	.389	14	–	16	.467
Utah State	7	–	11	.389	14	–	17	.452
Air Force	4	–	14	.222	12	–	21	.364
UNLV	4	–	14	.222	11	–	21	.344
† Conference tournament winner

The 2016–17 Boise State Broncos men's basketball team represented Boise State University during the 2016–17 NCAA Division I men's basketball season. The Broncos, led by seventh year head coach Leon Rice, played their home games at Taco Bell Arena as a member of the Mountain West Conference. They finished the season 20–12, 12–6 in Mountain West play to finish in third place. They lost in the quarterfinals of the Mountain West tournament to San Diego State. They received an invitation to the National Invitation Tournament where they defeated Utah in the first round before losing in the second round to Illinois.

== Previous season ==
The Broncos finished the season 20–12, 11–7 in Mountain West play to finish in third place. They lost in the first round of the Mountain West tournament to Colorado State. Despite having 20 wins, they did not participate in a postseason tournament after declining an invitation from the inaugural Vegas 16.

== Departures ==
Name	Number	Pos.	Height	Weight	Year	Hometown	Notes
Mikey Thompson	1	G	6'4"	180	RS Senior	North Las Vegas, NV	Graduated
Anthony Drmic	3	G/F	6'6"	203	RS Senior	Endeavour Hills, Australia	Graduated
Collin Landry	12	G	6'3"	180	Freshman	Portland, OR	Walk-on; didn't return
Cody Spjute	20	G	6'4"	195	Freshman	Boise, ID	Walk-on; didn't return
Montigo Alford	21	G	5'9"	168	Senior	Bloomington, CA	Graduated
James Webb III	23	F	6'9"	202	RS Junior	Augusta, GA	Declare for 2016 NBA draft
Lonnie Jackson	25	G	6'4"	178	RS Senior	Valencia, CA	Graduated

=== Incoming transfers ===
Name	Number	Pos.	Height	Weight	Year	Hometown	Notes
Cameron Oluyitan	23	G	6'7"	190	Sophomore	Sugar Land, TX	Junior college transferred from Gillette College.

== Recruiting ==
College recruiting information
Name	Hometown	School	Height	Weight	Commit date
Justinian Jessup; SF	Longmont, CO	Longmont High School	6 ft 5 in (1.96 m)	180 lb (82 kg)	Sep 12, 2015
Justinian Jessup; SF	Recruit ratings: Scout: Rivals: (68)				
Alex Hobbs; SG	La Porte, TX	La Porte High School	6 ft 4 in (1.93 m)	180 lb (82 kg)	Sep 9, 2015
Alex Hobbs; SG	Recruit ratings: Scout: Rivals: (NR)				
Marcus Dickinson; PG	Norman, OK	Norman North High School	6 ft 0 in (1.83 m)	175 lb (79 kg)	May 11, 2016
Marcus Dickinson; PG	Recruit ratings: Scout: Rivals: (NR)				
Overall recruit ranking: Scout: – Rivals: –
Note: In many cases, Scout, Rivals, 247Sports, On3, and ESPN may conflict in their listings of height and weight.; In these cases, the average was taken. ESPN grades are on a 100-point scale.; Sources: "2016 Team Ranking". Rivals.

== Roster ==
2016–17 Boise State Broncos men's basketball team
Players
Coaches

Pos.	#	Name	Height	Weight	Year	Previous school	Hometown
G	0	Marcus Dickinson	6 ft 2 in (1.88 m)	177 lb (80 kg)	Fr	Norman North HS	Norman, OK
G	3	Justinian Jessup	6 ft 6 in (1.98 m)	193 lb (88 kg)	Fr	Longmont HS	Longmont, CO
G	5	Malek Harwell	6 ft 4 in (1.93 m)	186 lb (84 kg)	RS Fr	Century HS	Pocatello, ID
F	10	Robin Jorch	6 ft 11 in (2.11 m)	253 lb (115 kg)	So	International Berlin Basketball Academy	Berlin, Germany
F	11	Zach Haney	6 ft 11 in (2.11 m)	242 lb (110 kg)	RS So	Atascocita HS	Humble, TX
F	13	Nicholas Duncan	6 ft 8 in (2.03 m)	265 lb (120 kg)	Sr	Australian Institute of Sport	Sydney, Australia
F	15	Chandler Hutchison	6 ft 7 in (2.01 m)	193 lb (88 kg)	Jr	Mission Viejo HS	Mission Viejo, CA
G	21	Derrick Alston Jr. (W)	6 ft 8 in (2.03 m)	153 lb (69 kg)	Fr	Strake Jesuit HS	Houston, TX
G	23	Cameron Oluyitan	6 ft 6 in (1.98 m)	183 lb (83 kg)	So	Gillette College	Houston, TX
G	30	Paris Austin	6 ft 0 in (1.83 m)	175 lb (79 kg)	So	Bishop O'Dowd HS	Oakland, CA
C	33	David Wacker	6 ft 10 in (2.08 m)	239 lb (108 kg)	RS So	Judson HS	Converse, TX
G	34	Alex Hobbs	6 ft 4 in (1.93 m)	189 lb (86 kg)	Fr	La Porte HS	La Porte, TX
F	40	Matt Grooms (W)	6 ft 4 in (1.93 m)	215 lb (98 kg)	RS Jr	Walla Walla CC	Meridian, ID
G	55	James Reid	6 ft 3 in (1.91 m)	193 lb (88 kg)	RS Sr	Arkansas–Little Rock	Bend, OR

Head coach

- Leon Rice (Washington State)

Assistant coach(es)

- John Rillie (Gonzaga)
- Phil Beckner (Kansas Wesleyan)
- Mike Burns (Central Washington)

Legend

- (C) Team captain
- (S) Suspended
- (I) Ineligible
- (W) Walk-on
- Injured
- Current redshirt

Roster

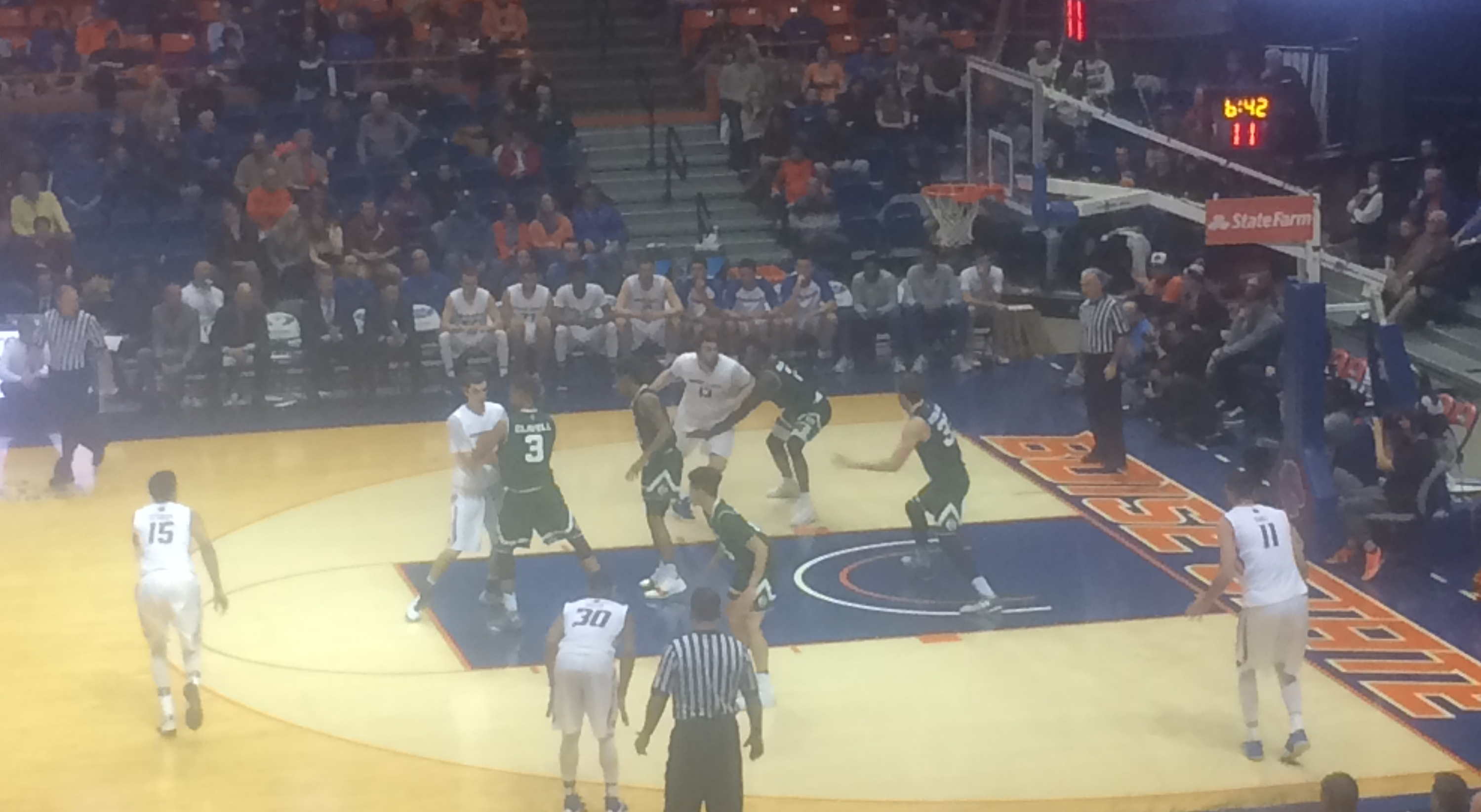
Boise State on offense in the second half vs Colorado State on 12/31/16.

== Schedule and results ==
Date time, TV	Rank^{#}	Opponent^{#}	Result	Record	Site (attendance) city, state
Costa Rica foreign tour
08/12/2016*; 5:00pm		vs. Brock	W 76–56		San Joaquín de Flores; Costa Rica
08/12/2016*; 7:00 pm		vs. Ottawa	L 88–90		San Joaquín de Flores, Costa Rica
08/13/2016*; 5:00 pm		vs. Costa Rica national team	W 74–54		Heredia, Costa Rica
08/14/2016*; 12:00 pm		vs. Ottawa	W 73–49		Palmares, Costa Rica
Exhibition
10/28/2016*; 7:00 pm		Lewis–Clark State	W 85–53		Taco Bell Arena (2,905); Boise, ID
11/05/2016*; 4:00 pm		Northwest Christian	W 91–76		Taco Bell Arena (2,812); Boise, ID
Non-conference regular season
11/12/2016*; 2:00 pm		Northwest	W 85–46	1–0	Taco Bell Arena (2,989); Boise, ID
11/17/2016*; 5:30 pm, ESPN3		at College of Charleston; Charleston Classic quarterfinals	L 47–60	1–1	TD Arena (3,430); Charleston, SC
11/18/2016*; 5:00 pm, ESPN3		vs. Mississippi State; Charleston Classic consolation round	L 68–80	1–2	TD Arena (3,517); Charleston, SC
11/20/2016*; 11:30 am, ESPN3		vs. Western Michigan; Charleston Classic 7th place game	W 91–70	2–2	TD Arena (1,293); Charleston, SC
11/25/2016*; 7:00 pm		Presbyterian	W 82–56	3–2	Taco Bell Arena (4,061); Boise, ID
11/28/2016*; 9:00 pm, P12N		at No. 23 Oregon	L 63–68	3–3	Matthew Knight Arena (6,824); Eugene, OR
11/30/2016*; 7:00 pm, MWN		SMU	W 71–62	4–3	Taco Bell Arena (4,812); Boise, ID
12/03/2016*; 12:00 pm, ESPN3		at Evansville; MW–MVC Challenge	L 67–72	4–4	Ford Center (3,773); Evansville, IN
12/05/2016*; 8:00 pm, theW.tv		at Loyola Marymount	W 80–79	5–4	Gersten Pavilion (1,332); Los Angeles, CA
12/10/2016*; 2:00 pm		Portland; Cancelled (travel conditions), game moved to 2017–18.			Taco Bell Arena; Boise, ID
12/18/2016*; 4:30 pm		Idaho State	W 82–59	6–4	Taco Bell Arena (4,303); Boise, ID
12/21/2016*; 7:00 pm		Cal State Northridge	W 79–62	7–4	Taco Bell Arena (3,468); Boise, ID
Mountain West regular season
12/28/2016; 7:00 pm, RTNW		at Utah State	W 83–80	8–4 (1–0)	Smith Spectrum (7,227); Logan, UT
12/31/2016; 4:00 pm, ESPN3		Colorado State	W 74–73	9–4 (2–0)	Taco Bell Arena (5,413); Boise, ID
01/04/2017; 9:00 pm, CBSSN		at UNLV	W 77–59	10–4 (3–0)	Thomas & Mack Center (8,872); Paradise, NV
01/07/2017; 9:15 pm, ESPNU		San Diego State	W 78–66	11–4 (4–0)	Taco Bell Arena (4,411); Boise, ID
01/14/2017; 5:00 pm		at Fresno State	L 80–89	11–5 (4–1)	Save Mart Center (6,978); Fresno, CA
01/17/2017; 9:00 pm, ESPNU		New Mexico	L 70–81	11–6 (4–2)	Taco Bell Arena (3,752); Boise, ID
01/21/2017; 3:00 pm		at San Jose State	W 75–65	12–6 (5–2)	Event Center Arena (1,907); San Jose, CA
01/25/2017; 8:00 pm, CBSSN		Nevada	L 57–76	12–7 (5–3)	Taco Bell Arena (7,059); Boise, ID
01/28/2017; 4:00 pm, RTNW		at Wyoming	W 80–65	13–7 (6–3)	Arena-Auditorium (6,552); Laramie, WY
01/31/2017; 7:00 pm, ESPN3		at Colorado State	W 79–76	14–7 (7–3)	Moby Arena (3,926); Fort Collins, CO
02/04/2017; 6:00 pm, ESPN3		Utah State	W 72–70	15–7 (8–3)	Taco Bell Arena (7,560); Boise, ID
02/11/2017; 4:00 pm, RTNW		Air Force	W 76–66	16–7 (9–3)	Taco Bell Arena (7,208); Boise, ID
02/14/2017; 8:00 pm, CBSSN		at New Mexico	L 73–78	16–8 (9–4)	The Pit (11,071); Albuquerque, NM
02/18/2017; 4:00 pm, RTNW		Wyoming	W 91–87	17–8 (10–4)	Taco Bell Arena (7,420); Boise, ID
02/22/2017; 8:00 pm, ESPN3		at Nevada	L 77–85	17–9 (10–5)	Lawlor Events Center (8,625); Reno, NV
02/25/2017; 2:00 pm		San Jose State	W 85–78	18–9 (11–5)	Taco Bell Arena (7,293); Boise, ID
02/28/2017; 8:00 pm, CBSSN		Fresno State	L 67–74	18–10 (11–6)	Taco Bell Arena (5,804); Boise, ID
03/04/2017; 2:00 pm, RTNW		at Air Force	W 98–70	19–10 (12–6)	Clune Arena (2,118); Colorado Springs, CO
Mountain West tournament
03/09/2017; 9:30 pm, CBSSN	(3)	vs. (6) San Diego State; Quarterfinals	L 68–87	19–11	Thomas & Mack Center (5,057); Paradise, NV
NIT
03/14/2017*; 8:00 pm, ESPNU	(6)	at (3) Utah; First Round – Illinois State Bracket	W 73–68	20–11	Jon M. Huntsman Center (4,097); Salt Lake City, UT
03/20/2017*; 7:00 pm, ESPN	(6)	at (2) Illinois; Second Round – Illinois State Bracket	L 56–71	20–12	State Farm Center (5,713); Champaign, IL
*Non-conference game. ^{#}Rankings from AP Poll. (#) Tournament seedings in parentheses. All times are in Mountain Time Source.
