= 2016–17 San Jose State Spartans men's basketball team =

American college basketball season

2016–17 San Jose State Spartans men's basketball
- Conference: Mountain West Conference
- Record: 14–16 (7–11 MW)
- Head coach: Dave Wojcik (4th season)
- Assistant coaches: Mike Lepore; Rodney Tention; Tyler Ojanen
- Home arena: Event Center Arena

2016–17 Mountain West Conference men's basketball standings
| | Conf. | | | | Overall |
| Team | W | | L | PCT | W | | L | PCT |
|---|---|---|---|---|---|---|---|---|
| Nevada † | 14 | – | 4 | .778 | 28 | – | 7 | .800 |
| Colorado State | 13 | – | 5 | .722 | 24 | – | 12 | .667 |
| Boise State | 12 | – | 6 | .667 | 20 | – | 12 | .625 |
| Fresno State | 11 | – | 7 | .611 | 20 | – | 13 | .606 |
| New Mexico | 10 | – | 8 | .556 | 17 | – | 14 | .548 |
| San Diego State | 9 | – | 9 | .500 | 19 | – | 14 | .576 |
| Wyoming | 8 | – | 10 | .444 | 23 | – | 15 | .605 |
| San Jose State | 7 | – | 11 | .389 | 14 | – | 16 | .467 |
| Utah State | 7 | – | 11 | .389 | 14 | – | 17 | .452 |
| Air Force | 4 | – | 14 | .222 | 12 | – | 21 | .364 |
| UNLV | 4 | – | 14 | .222 | 11 | – | 21 | .344 |
† Conference tournament winner

The 2016–17 San Jose State Spartans men's basketball team represented San Jose State University during the 2016–17 NCAA Division I men's basketball season. The Spartans, led by fourth year head coach Dave Wojcik, played their home games at the Event Center Arena as members of the Mountain West Conference. They finished the season 14–16, 7–11 in Mountain West play to finish in a tie for eighth place. They lost in the first round of the Mountain West tournament to Utah State.

On July 10, 2017, Dave Wojcik resigned as head coach for personal reasons. On August 4, the school hired Jean Prioleau as head coach.

== Previous season ==
The Spartans finished the season 9–22, 4–14 in Mountain West play to finish in last place. During the season, the Spartans were invited and participated in the Great Alaska Shootout in Anchorage, Alaska. During the tournament, they defeated San Diego and Alaska–Anchorage to earn 5th place. In the postseason, they lost in the first round of the Mountain West tournament to Colorado State.

== Offseason ==
=== Departures ===
| Name | Number | Pos. | Height | Weight | Year | Hometown | Notes |
|---|---|---|---|---|---|---|---|
| Ivo Basor | 10 | C | 6'8" | 240 | Senior | Watsonville, CA | Walk-on; graduated |
| Danny Mahoney | 11 | G | 6'0" | 160 | Sophomore | San Mateo, CA | Walk-on; left team |
| Frank Rogers | 14 | F | 6'9" | 225 | RS Senior | Salinas, CA | Graduated |
| Princeton Onwas | 23 | G | 6'6" | 215 | RS Senior | Houston, TX | Graduated |
| Leon Bahner | 25 | C | 6'11" | 225 | RS Freshman | Bonn, Germany | Transferred |

=== 2016 recruiting class ===
College recruiting
| Name | Hometown | School | Height | Weight | Commit date |
|---|---|---|---|---|---|
| Keith Fisher #58 PF | Los Angeles, CA | Westchester High School | 6 ft 7 in (2.01 m) | 210 lb (95 kg) | Sep 11, 2015 |
| Keith Fisher #58 PF | Recruit ratings: Scout: Rivals: ESPN: | | | | |
| Terrell Brown #76 SG | Hayward, CA | Moreau Catholic High School | 6 ft 2 in (1.88 m) | 185 lb (84 kg) | Aug 30, 2015 |
| Terrell Brown #76 SG | Recruit ratings: Scout: Rivals: ESPN: | | | | |
| Isaiah Nichols; PG | Oxnard, CA | Avon Old Farms School For Boys | 6 ft 5 in (1.96 m) | 180 lb (82 kg) | May 9, 2016 |
| Isaiah Nichols; PG | Recruit ratings: Scout: Rivals: ESPN: | | | | |
| Nai Carlisle; PG | West Lafayette, IN | West Lafayette High School | 6 ft 2 in (1.88 m) | 185 lb (84 kg) | Nov 11, 2015 |
| Nai Carlisle; PG | Recruit ratings: Scout: Rivals: | | | | |
Overall recruit ranking: Scout: – Rivals: –
Note: In many cases, Scout, Rivals, 247Sports, On3, and ESPN may conflict in their listings of height and weight.; In these cases, the average was taken. ESPN grades are on a 100-point scale.; Sources: "2016 San Jose State Basketball Recruiting Commits". Scout.; "Scout.com Team Recruiting Rankings". Scout.; "2016 Team Ranking". Rivals.

=== 2017 recruiting class ===
College recruiting (2017)
| Name | Hometown | School | Height | Weight | Commit date |
|---|---|---|---|---|---|
| Noah Baumann; SF | Phoenix, AZ | Desert Vista High School | 6 ft 5 in (1.96 m) | 180 lb (82 kg) | Jun 13, 2016 |
| Noah Baumann; SF | Recruit ratings: Scout: Rivals: (NR) | | | | |
Overall recruit ranking: Scout: – Rivals: –
Note: In many cases, Scout, Rivals, 247Sports, On3, and ESPN may conflict in their listings of height and weight.; In these cases, the average was taken. ESPN grades are on a 100-point scale.; Sources: "2016 San Jose State Basketball Recruiting Commits". Scout.; "Scout.com Team Recruiting Rankings". Scout.; "2017 Team Ranking". Rivals.

== Roster ==
2016–17 San Jose State Spartans men's basketball team
Players
Coaches

| Pos. | # | Name | Height | Weight | Year | Previous school | Hometown |
|---|---|---|---|---|---|---|---|
| G | 0 | Terrell Brown | 6 ft 2 in (1.88 m) | 160 lb (73 kg) | Fr | Moreau Catholic HS | Hayward, California |
| G | 2 | Gary Williams, Jr. (C) | 6 ft 5 in (1.96 m) | 215 lb (98 kg) | Sr | Castlemont HS; Indian Hills CC | Vallejo, California |
| F | 4 | Brandon Mitchell | 6 ft 6 in (1.98 m) | 210 lb (95 kg) | RS Jr | Ridgeway HS | Memphis, Tennessee |
| F | 5 | Keith Fisher III (injured) (redshirt) | 6 ft 8 in (2.03 m) | 215 lb (98 kg) | Fr | Westchester HS | Los Angeles, California |
| G | 10 | Isaiah Nichols | 6 ft 5 in (1.96 m) | 180 lb (82 kg) | Fr | Avon Old Farms HS | Oxnard, California |
| G | 11 | E. J. Boyce (W) | 6 ft 2 in (1.88 m) | 170 lb (77 kg) | So | College of Southern Idaho | Boise, Idaho |
| G | 15 | Brandon Clarke | 6 ft 8 in (2.03 m) | 205 lb (93 kg) | So | Desert Vista HS | Phoenix, Arizona |
| G | 20 | Isaac Thornton | 6 ft 2 in (1.88 m) | 185 lb (84 kg) | Sr | Sam Houston HS | San Antonio, Texas |
| G | 21 | Jalen James (C) | 6 ft 3 in (1.91 m) | 170 lb (77 kg) | RS Jr | La Lumiere School | Chicago, Illinois |
| G | 22 | Nai Carlisle | 6 ft 2 in (1.88 m) | 200 lb (91 kg) | Fr | West Lafayette HS | West Lafayette, Indiana |
| F | 24 | Ryan Singer | 6 ft 9 in (2.06 m) | 235 lb (107 kg) | RS So | Heritage HS; Massanutten Military Academy | Littleton, Colorado |
| G | 25 | Jaycee Hillsman | 6 ft 6 in (1.98 m) | 225 lb (102 kg) | So | Simeon Career Academy | Champaign, Illinois |
| F | 32 | Ryan Welage | 6 ft 9 in (2.06 m) | 205 lb (93 kg) | So | Greensburg HS | Greensburg, Indiana |
| F | 33 | Cody Schwartz | 6 ft 8 in (2.03 m) | 210 lb (95 kg) | So | West De Pere HS | De Pere, Wisconsin |
| C | 41 | Ashtin Chastain | 6 ft 11 in (2.11 m) | 245 lb (111 kg) | RS Fr | Norco HS | Norco, California |

Head coach

- Dave Wojcik (Loyola (MD))

Assistant coach(es)

- Mike Lepore (Wake Forest)
- Rodney Tention (San Francisco)
- Tyler Ojanen (California Baptist)

Legend

- (C) Team captain
- (S) Suspended
- (I) Ineligible
- (W) Walk-on
- Injured
- Current redshirt

Roster

== Schedule and results ==
| Date time, TV | Rank^{#} | Opponent^{#} | Result | Record | Site (attendance) city, state |
Exhibition
| 11/01/2016*; 7:30 pm | | Pacific Union | W 101–64 | | Event Center Arena (1,279); San Jose, CA |
| 11/06/2016*; 2:00 pm | | Cal State East Bay | W 96–80 | | Event Center Arena (1,031); San Jose, CA |
Non-conference regular season
| 11/12/2016*; 2:00 pm | | West Coast Baptist | W 109–70 | 1–0 | Event Center Arena (1,481); San Jose, CA |
| 11/15/2016*; 7:00 pm | | Portland | L 66–79 | 1–1 | Event Center Arena (1,623); San Jose, CA |
| 11/17/2016*; 7:00 pm | | Denver | L 69–74 | 1–2 | Event Center Arena (1,481); San Jose, CA |
| 11/22/2016*; 7:00 pm, CHN/TheW.tv | | at No. 15 Saint Mary's | L 64–81 | 1–3 | McKeon Pavilion (3,178); Moraga, CA |
| 11/27/2016*; 3:00 pm, P12N | | at Washington State | W 88–76 | 2–3 | Beasley Coliseum (2,317); Pullman, WA |
| 11/29/2016*; 7:00 pm | | at Idaho | W 58–49 | 3–3 | Memorial Gymnasium (674); Moscow, ID |
| 12/03/2016*; 7:00 pm | | Santa Clara; Clash of the County | W 55–40 | 4–3 | Event Center Arena (2,237); San Jose, CA |
| 12/07/2016*; 6:00 pm | | at Montana | L 62–81 | 4–4 | Dahlberg Arena (3,024); Missoula, MT |
| 12/10/2016*; 2:00 pm | | Life Pacific | W 109–70 | 5–4 | Event Center Arena (1,323); San Jose, CA |
| 12/18/2016*; 2:00 pm | | Bowling Green | W 77–76 | 6–4 | Event Center Arena (1,452); San Jose, CA |
| 12/21/2016*; 7:00 pm | | Southern Utah | W 92–82 | 7–4 | Event Center Arena (1,289); San Jose, CA |
Mountain West regular season
| 12/28/2016; 7:00 pm | | at Nevada | L 55–80 | 7–5 (0–1) | Lawlor Events Center (10,098); Reno, NV |
| 01/04/2017; 7:00 pm, MWN | | Colorado State | L 71–76 | 7–6 (0–2) | Event Center Arena (1,523); San Jose, CA |
| 01/07/2017; 2:00 pm | | Fresno State; Rivalry | W 69–62 | 8–6 (1–2) | Event Center Arena (1,721); San Jose, CA |
| 01/10/2017; 8:00 pm, ESPNU | | at San Diego State | L 61–76 | 8–7 (1–3) | Viejas Arena (12,414); San Diego, CA |
| 01/14/2017; 1:00 pm | | at Air Force | W 89–85 | 9–7 (2–3) | Clune Arena (2,417); Colorado Springs, CO |
| 01/18/2017; 7:00 pm | | Wyoming | L 70–80 | 9–8 (2–4) | Event Center Arena (1,468); San Jose, CA |
| 01/21/2017; 2:00 pm | | Boise State | L 65–75 | 9–9 (2–5) | Event Center Arena (1,907); San Jose, CA |
| 01/25/2017; 6:00 pm, RTRM | | at Colorado State | L 72–81 | 9–10 (2–6) | Moby Arena (2,753); Fort Collins, CO |
| 01/28/2017; 2:00 pm | | UNLV | W 76–72 | 10–10 (3–6) | Event Center Arena (2,106); San Jose, CA |
| 02/04/2017; 3:00 pm, RTRM | | at New Mexico | W 78–68 | 11–10 (4–6) | The Pit (12,731); Albuquerque, NM |
| 02/07/2017; 8:00 pm, CBSSN | | San Diego State | W 76–71 | 12–10 (5–6) | Event Center Arena (3,107); San Jose, CA |
| 02/11/2017; 3:00 pm, MWN | | at UNLV | W 76–74 | 13–10 (6–6) | Thomas & Mack Center (10,349); Paradise, NV |
| 02/15/2017; 7:00 pm | | at Fresno State; Rivalry | L 59–77 | 13–11 (6–7) | Save Mart Center (5,914); Fresno, CA |
| 02/18/2017; 2:00 pm | | Air Force | W 83–78 ^{OT} | 14–11 (7–7) | Event Center Arena (2,254); San Jose, CA |
| 02/22/2017; 7:00 pm | | Utah State | L 75–81 | 14–12 (7–8) | Event Center Arena (2,316); San Jose, CA |
| 02/25/2017; 1:00 pm | | at Boise State | L 78–85 | 14–13 (7–9) | Taco Bell Arena (7,293); Boise, ID |
| 03/01/2017; 7:00 pm, MWN | | Nevada | L 67–82 | 14–14 (7–10) | Event Center Arena (2,522); San Jose, CA |
| 03/04/2017; 1:00 pm | | at Wyoming | L 62–74 | 14–15 (7–11) | Arena-Auditorium (5,931); Laramie, WY |
Mountain West tournament
| 03/08/2016; 11:00 am, MWN | (9) | vs. (8) Utah State; First round | L 64–90 | 14–16 | Thomas & Mack Center (4,979); Paradise, NV |
*Non-conference game. ^{#}Rankings from AP Poll. (#) Tournament seedings in parentheses. All times are in Pacific Time.
