= 2016–17 Nevada Wolf Pack men's basketball team =

American college basketball season

2016–17 Nevada Wolf Pack men's basketball

Mountain West regular season champions Mountain West tournament champions

NCAA tournament, First Round
- Conference: Mountain West Conference
- Record: 28–7 (14–4 MW)
- Head coach: Eric Musselman (2nd season)
- Assistant coaches: Dave Rice; Yanni Hufnagel; Ronald Dupree
- Home arena: Lawlor Events Center

2016–17 Mountain West Conference men's basketball standings
	Conf.				Overall
Team	W		L	PCT	W		L	PCT
Nevada †	14	–	4	.778	28	–	7	.800
Colorado State	13	–	5	.722	24	–	12	.667
Boise State	12	–	6	.667	20	–	12	.625
Fresno State	11	–	7	.611	20	–	13	.606
New Mexico	10	–	8	.556	17	–	14	.548
San Diego State	9	–	9	.500	19	–	14	.576
Wyoming	8	–	10	.444	23	–	15	.605
San Jose State	7	–	11	.389	14	–	16	.467
Utah State	7	–	11	.389	14	–	17	.452
Air Force	4	–	14	.222	12	–	21	.364
UNLV	4	–	14	.222	11	–	21	.344
† Conference tournament winner

The 2016–17 Nevada Wolf Pack men's basketball team represented the University of Nevada, Reno during the 2016–17 NCAA Division I men's basketball season. The Wolf Pack, led by second-year head coach Eric Musselman, played their home games at the Lawlor Events Center in Reno, Nevada, as members of the Mountain West Conference. They finished the season 28–7, 14–4 in Mountain West play to win the Mountain West regular season championship. They defeated Utah State, Fresno State, and Colorado State to win the Mountain West tournament championship. They received the conference's automatic bid to the NCAA tournament where they lost in the first round to Iowa State.

== Previous season ==
The Wolf Pack finished the 2015–16 season 24–14, 10–8 in Mountain West play to finish in a tie for fourth place. They defeated New Mexico in the quarterfinals of the Mountain West tournament to advance to the semifinals where they lost to San Diego State. They were invited to the College Basketball Invitational where they defeated Montana, Eastern Washington, and Vermont to advance to the best-of-three finals series against Morehead State. They defeated Morehead State two games to one to become the CBI champions.

== Departures ==
Name	Number	Pos.	Height	Weight	Year	Hometown	Notes
Marqueze Coleman	1	G	6'4"	190	Senior	Mission Hills, CA	Graduated
Tyron Criswell	2	G	6'3"	205	Senior	Omaha, NE	Graduated
A. J. West	3	C	6'9"	235	Senior	Brooklyn, NY	Graduated
Kaileb Rodriguez	5	F	6'9"	235	Junior	Highlands Ranch, CO	Graduate transferred to Northwest Nazarene
Robyn Missa	20	F	6'9"	245	Sophomore	Berlin, Germany	Transferred
Eric Cooper, Jr.	21	G	6'3"	180	Sophomore	Long Beach, CA	Transferred to Pepperdine
Lucas Stivrins	34	F	6'11"	235	Senior	Scottsdale, AZ	Graduated

=== Incoming transfers ===
Name	Number	Pos.	Height	Weight	Year	Hometown	Notes
Hallice Cooke	3	G	6'3"	190	RS Junior	Union City, NJ	Transferred from Iowa State. Under NCAA transfer rules, Cooke will have to sit out for the 2016–17 season. Will have two years of remaining eligibility.
Cody Martin	5	G/F	6'7"	215	Junior	Mocksville, NC	Transferred from NC State. Under NCAA transfer rules, Cody Martin will have to sit out for the 2016–17 season. Will have two years of remaining eligibility.
Caleb Martin	10	G/F	6'7"	210	Junior	Mocksville, NC	Transferred from NC State. Under NCAA transfer rules, Caleb Martin will have to sit out for the 2016–17 season. Will have two years of remaining eligibility.
Kendall Stephens	21	G	6'6"	197	Senior	St. Charles, IL	Transferred from Purdue. Under NCAA transfer rules, Stephens will have to sit out for the 2016–17 season. Will have one year of remaining eligibility.

== Recruiting ==
College recruiting information
Name	Hometown	School	Height	Weight	Commit date
Kenneth Wooten #33 PF	Manteca, CA	Manteca High School	6 ft 9 in (2.06 m)	200 lb (91 kg)	Sep 14, 2015
Kenneth Wooten #33 PF	Recruit ratings: Scout: Rivals: (80)				
Devearl Ramsey #49 PG	Chatsworth, CA	Sierra Canyon High School	5 ft 10 in (1.78 m)	170 lb (77 kg)	Oct 5, 2015
Devearl Ramsey #49 PG	Recruit ratings: Scout: Rivals: (73)				
Joshua Hall #59 SF	Detroit, MI	Genesis Academy	6 ft 7 in (2.01 m)	195 lb (88 kg)	Oct 15, 2015
Joshua Hall #59 SF	Recruit ratings: Scout: Rivals: (72)				
Overall recruit ranking: Scout: – Rivals: –
Note: In many cases, Scout, Rivals, 247Sports, On3, and ESPN may conflict in their listings of height and weight.; In these cases, the average was taken. ESPN grades are on a 100-point scale.; Sources: "2016 Team Ranking". Rivals.

=== Recruiting class of 2017 ===
College recruiting information
Name	Hometown	School	Height	Weight	Commit date
Trevon Abdullah #69 SF	Las Vegas, NV	Desert Pines High School	6 ft 5 in (1.96 m)	210 lb (95 kg)	Sep 3, 2015
Trevon Abdullah #69 SF	Recruit ratings: Scout: Rivals: (63)				
Overall recruit ranking: Scout: – Rivals: –
Note: In many cases, Scout, Rivals, 247Sports, On3, and ESPN may conflict in their listings of height and weight.; In these cases, the average was taken. ESPN grades are on a 100-point scale.; Sources: "2017 Team Ranking". Rivals.

== Roster ==
2016–17 Nevada Wolf Pack men's basketball team
Players
Coaches

Pos.	#	Name	Height	Weight	Year	Previous school	Hometown
F	0	Cameron Oliver	6 ft 8 in (2.03 m)	225 lb (102 kg)	So	Grant Union HS	Sacramento, CA
G	1	Marcus Marshall	6 ft 3 in (1.91 m)	190 lb (86 kg)	RS Sr	Johnson Sr. HS; Missouri State	Saint Paul, MN
F	2	Leland King II (W)	6 ft 7 in (2.01 m)	215 lb (98 kg)	RS Jr	Brentwood HS; Brown	Inglewood, CA
G	3	Hallice Cooke (I) (redshirt)	6 ft 3 in (1.91 m)	190 lb (86 kg)	RS Jr	St. Anthony; Iowa State	Union City, NJ
G	4	Devearl Ramsey	5 ft 10 in (1.78 m)	170 lb (77 kg)	Fr	Sierra Canyon HS	Chatsworth, CA
G/F	5	Cody Martin (I) (redshirt)	6 ft 7 in (2.01 m)	210 lb (95 kg)	Jr	Oak Hill Academy; NC State	Mocksville, NC
G/F	10	Caleb Martin (I) (redshirt)	6 ft 7 in (2.01 m)	215 lb (98 kg)	Jr	Oak Hill Academy; NC State	Mocksville, NC
F	12	Elijah Foster	6 ft 7 in (2.01 m)	255 lb (116 kg)	Jr	Rainier Beach HS	Seattle, WA
G	14	Lindsey Drew	6 ft 4 in (1.93 m)	180 lb (82 kg)	So	Fairfax HS	Los Angeles, CA
G	15	DJ Fenner	6 ft 6 in (1.98 m)	205 lb (93 kg)	Sr	Seattle Prep	Seattle, WA
G	20	David Cunningham (W)	6 ft 4 in (1.93 m)	195 lb (88 kg)	So	Bella Vista HS	Sacramento, CA
G	21	Kendall Stephens (I) (redshirt)	6 ft 7 in (2.01 m)	205 lb (93 kg)	Sr	St. Charles East HS; Purdue	St. Charles, IL
G	23	Charlie Tooley (W)	6 ft 0 in (1.83 m)	190 lb (86 kg)	Fr	Granite Bay HS	Granite Bay, CA
F	24	Jordan Caroline	6 ft 7 in (2.01 m)	235 lb (107 kg)	RS So	Montverde Academy; Southern Illinois	Champaign, IL
F	33	Josh Hall	6 ft 6 in (1.98 m)	190 lb (86 kg)	Fr	Montverde Academy	Detroit, MI
F	34	John Carlson (W)	6 ft 8 in (2.03 m)	225 lb (102 kg)	So	Damonte Ranch; San Diego Christian	Reno, NV

Head coach

- Eric Musselman (San Diego)

Assistant coach(es)

- Dave Rice (UNLV)
- Yanni Hufnagel (Cornell)
- Ronald Dupree (LSU)

Legend

- (C) Team captain
- (S) Suspended
- (I) Ineligible
- (W) Walk-on
- Injured
- Current redshirt

Roster

== Schedule ==
Date time, TV	Rank^{#}	Opponent^{#}	Result	Record	Site (attendance) city, state
Exhibition
11/04/2016*; 7:00 pm		San Francisco State	W 88–58		Lawlor Events Center (4,120); Reno, NV
Non-conference regular season
11/11/2016*; 8:00 pm		at No. 17 Saint Mary's	L 63–81	0–1	McKeon Pavilion (3,500); Moraga, CA
11/14/2016*; 7:00 pm		Loyola Marymount	W 79–64	1–1	Lawlor Events Center (6,176); Reno, NV
11/18/2016*; 7:00 pm, ESPN3		Oregon State	W 83–58	2–1	Lawlor Events Center (8,090); Reno, NV
11/20/2016*; 5:00 pm		Iona; Great Alaska Shootout opening round	W 91–76	3–1	Lawlor Events Center (6,375); Reno, NV
11/23/2016*; 10:30 pm, CBSSN		vs. Oakland; Great Alaska Shootout quarterfinals	W 82–78	4–1	Alaska Airlines Center (2,606); Anchorage, AK
11/25/2016*; 6:30 pm, CBSSN		vs. Buffalo; Great Alaska Shootout semifinals	W 67–62	5–1	Alaska Airlines Center (2,723); Anchorage, AK
11/26/2016*; 9:30 pm, CBSSN		vs. Iona; Great Alaska Shootout championship	L 73–75	5–2	Alaska Airlines Center (3,233); Anchorage, AK
11/29/2016*; 7:00 pm		Pacific	W 77–67	6–2	Lawlor Events Center (6,920); Reno, NV
12/03/2016*; 5:00 pm		at Bradley; MW–MVC Challenge	W 91–69	7–2	Carver Arena (5,384); Peoria, IL
12/11/2016*; 5:00 pm, P12N		at Washington	W 87–85	8–2	Alaska Airlines Arena (8,171); Seattle, WA
12/14/2016*; 7:00 pm		UC Irvine	W 76–69	9–2	Lawlor Events Center (6,911); Reno, NV
12/21/2016*; 2:20 pm		vs. Towson; Las Vegas Holiday Hoops Classic	W 81–72	10–2	South Point Arena (218); Enterprise, NV
12/22/2016*; 2:30 pm		vs. UC Santa Barbara; Las Vegas Holiday Hoops Classic	W 67–66	11–2	South Point Arena (264); Enterprise, NV
Mountain West regular season
12/28/2016; 7:00 pm, MWN		San Jose State	W 80–55	12–2 (1–0)	Lawlor Events Center (10,098); Reno, NV
12/31/2016; 4:00 pm, ESPN3		at Fresno State	L 76–77	12–3 (1–1)	Save Mart Center (6,043); Fresno, CA
01/04/2017; 8:00 pm, ESPN2		San Diego State	W 72–69	13–3 (2–1)	Lawlor Events Center (8,461); Reno, NV
01/07/2017; 8:15 pm, ESPN2		at New Mexico	W 105–104 ^{OT}	14–3 (3–1)	The Pit (11,235); Albuquerque, NM
01/14/2017; 3:00 pm, ESPN3		at Wyoming	W 89–74	15–3 (4–1)	Arena-Auditorium (4,794); Laramie, WY
01/18/2017; 7:00 pm, RTRM		Air Force	W 83–76	16–3 (5–1)	Lawlor Events Center (8,462); Reno, NV
01/21/2017; 3:00 pm, CBSSN		Fresno State	L 76–81	16–4 (5–2)	Lawlor Events Center (10,236); Reno, NV
01/25/2017; 7:00 pm, CBSSN		at Boise State	W 76–57	17–4 (6–2)	Taco Bell Arena (7,059); Boise, ID
01/28/2017; 1:00 pm, CBSSN		New Mexico	W 82–65	18–4 (7–2)	Lawlor Events Center (10,727); Reno, NV
02/01/2017; 6:00 pm, ESPN3		at Utah State	L 57–74	18–5 (7–3)	Smith Spectrum (6,122); Logan, UT
02/08/2017; 8:00 pm, CBSSN		UNLV	W 104–77	19–5 (8–3)	Lawlor Events Center (11,841); Reno, NV
02/12/2017; 1:00 pm, CBSSN		at San Diego State	L 56–70	19–6 (8–4)	Viejas Arena (11,697); San Diego, CA
02/15/2017; 6:00 pm, ESPN3		at Air Force	W 78–59	20–6 (9–4)	Clune Arena (1,623); Colorado Springs, CO
02/18/2017; 7:00 pm, ESPN3		Utah State	W 77–66	21–6 (10–4)	Lawlor Events Center (10,336); Reno, NV
02/22/2017; 7:00 pm, ESPN3		Boise State	W 85–77	22–6 (11–4)	Lawlor Events Center (8,625); Reno, NV
02/25/2017; 3:00 pm, CBSSN		at UNLV	W 94–58	23–6 (12–4)	Thomas & Mack Center (14,808); Paradise, NV
03/01/2017; 7:00 pm, MWN		at San Jose State	W 82–67	24–6 (13–4)	Event Center Arena (2,522); San Jose, CA
03/04/2017; 5:00 pm, ESPN3		Colorado State	W 85–72	25–6 (14–4)	Lawlor Events Center (11,662); Reno, NV
Mountain West tournament
03/09/2017; 12:00 pm, CBSSN	(1)	vs. (8) Utah State; Quarterfinals	W 83–69	26–6	Thomas & Mack Center (5,866); Paradise, NV
03/10/2017; 7:00 pm, CBSSN	(1)	vs. (4) Fresno State; Semifinals	W 83–72	27–6	Thomas & Mack Center (6,211); Paradise, NV
03/11/2017; 3:00 pm, CBS	(1)	vs. (2) Colorado State; Championship	W 79–71	28–6	Thomas & Mack Center (5,602); Paradise, NV
NCAA tournament
03/16/2017*; 6:57 pm, truTV	(12 MW)	vs. (5 MW) No. 17 Iowa State; First Round	L 73–84	28–7	BMO Harris Bradley Center (18,025); Milwaukee, WI
*Non-conference game. (#) Tournament seedings in parentheses. MW=Midwest Region Source. All times are in Pacific Time.
