= Dražkovce =

Village and municipality in Slovakia

- Municipality
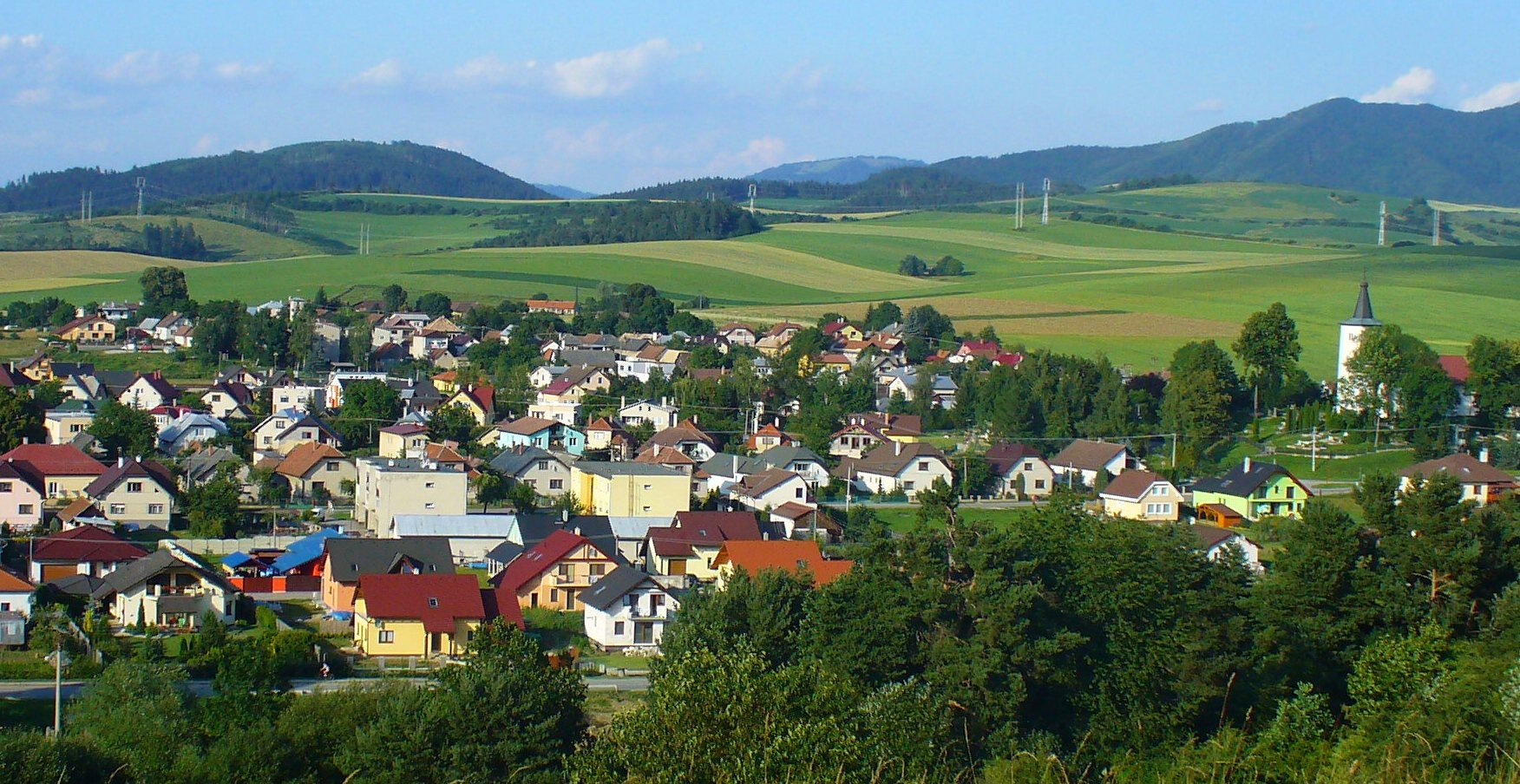

- Flag

- Location of Dražkovce in the Žilina Region Location of Dražkovce in Slovakia
- Coordinates: 49.05°N 18.97°E
- Country: Slovakia
- Region: Žilina Region
- District: Martin District
- First mentioned: 1260

Area
  - Total: 4.42 km^{2} (1.71 sq mi)
- Elevation: 426 m (1,398 ft)

Population (2025)
  - Total: 1,063
- Time zone: UTC+1 (CET)
  - Summer (DST): UTC+2 (CEST)
- Postal code: 380 2
- Area code: +421 43
- Vehicle registration plate (until 2022): MT
- Website: www.obecdrazkovce.sk

Dražkovce (Hungarian: Draskócvölgye, German: Andreas-Josef) is a village and municipality in Martin District in the Žilina Region of northern Slovakia.

== History ==
In historical records the village was first mentioned in 1260. Before the establishment of independent Czechoslovakia in 1918, it was part of Turóc County within the Kingdom of Hungary. From 1939 to 1945, it was part of the Slovak Republic.

== Geography ==
The municipality lies at an altitude of 426 metres (1,398 ft) and covers an area of 4.42 km^{2} (1.71 sq mi) (2025).

== Population ==
Population statistic (10 years)
Year	1995	2005	2015	2025
Count	493	611	960	1063
Difference		+23.93%	+57.11%	+10.72%

Population statistic
Year	2024	2025
Count	1063	1063
Difference		−1.42%

It has a population of 1063 people (31 December 2025).

=== Ethnicity ===
Census 2021 (1+ %)
Ethnicity	Number	Fraction
Slovak	971	95.28%
Not found out	41	4.02%
Total	1019	

In year 2021 was 1019 people by ethnicity 971 as Slovak, 41 as Not found out, 8 as Czech, 5 as Other, 4 as Ukrainian, 4 as Romani, 3 as Russian, 3 as Moravian, 2 as Rusyn, 1 as Jewish, 1 as Irish, 1 as German and 1 as Hungarian.

Note on population: The difference values of population numbers in the table "Population statistic" and in the sections "Ethnicity" & "Religion" is caused by the use of various statistical methods.

=== Religion ===
Census 2021 (1+ %)
Religion	Number	Fraction
None	415	40.73%
Roman Catholic Church	313	30.72%
Evangelical Church	231	22.67%
Not found out	41	4.02%
Total	1019	

In year 2021 was 1019 people by religion 415 from None, 313 from Roman Catholic Church, 231 from Evangelical Church, 41 from Not found out, 5 from Greek Catholic Church, 5 from Ad hoc movements, 4 from Other, 2 from Christian Congregations in Slovakia, 2 from Buddhism and 1 from United Methodist Church.

== Genealogical resources ==
The records for genealogical research are available at the state archive "Statny Archiv in Bytca, Slovakia"

- Roman Catholic church records (births/marriages/deaths): 1730-1900 (parish A)
- Lutheran church records (births/marriages/deaths): 1784-1904 (parish B)

== See also ==
- List of municipalities and towns in Slovakia
