= Diamond Head Classic =

College basketball tournament

- Current season, competition or edition: 2024 Diamond Head Classic
- Sport: College basketball
- Founded: 2009
- No. of teams: 8
- Country: United States
- Venues: Bankoh Arena at the Stan Sheriff Center; Honolulu, Hawaii
- Most recent champion: Nebraska
- Most titles: USC (2)
- Broadcasters: ESPNU, ESPN2
- Sponsor: Hawaiian Airlines
- Website: diamondheadclassic.com

The Diamond Head Classic is a three-day invitational college basketball tournament held at the Bankoh Arena at the Stan Sheriff Center in Honolulu, Hawaii on the campus of the University of Hawaiʻi at Mānoa. Each team plays three games, winners facing winners and losers facing losers. The Big West Conference serves as the host. The tournament is ESPN-owned and operated.

The inaugural tournament was won by USC in 2009. The most recent champions are the Nebraska Cornhuskers.

The 2025 edition will not be played and the future of the tournament is unclear.

== Yearly champions, runners-up, and MVPs ==
Year	Winner	Score	Opponent	Tournament MVP
2009	USC	67–56	UNLV	Mike Gerrity, USC
2010	Butler	84–68	Washington State	Matt Howard, Butler
2011	Kansas State	77–60	Long Beach State	Rodney McGruder, Kansas State
2012	Arizona	68–67	San Diego State	Solomon Hill, Arizona
2013	Iowa State	70–66	Boise State	DeAndre Kane, Iowa State
2014	George Washington	60–54	Wichita State	Kevin Larsen, George Washington
2015	Oklahoma	83–71	Harvard	Buddy Hield, Oklahoma
2016	San Diego State	62–48	San Francisco	Zylan Cheatham, San Diego State
2017	USC	77–72	New Mexico State	Bennie Boatwright, USC
2018	TCU	83–69	Indiana State	Alex Robinson, TCU
2019	Houston	75–71	Washington	Fabian White Jr., Houston
2020	Tournament not held due to the COVID-19 pandemic			
2021	The championship final between Stanford and Vanderbilt was canceled because of COVID-19 issues in the Cardinal camp. Vanderbilt awarded championship.			Darius McGhee, Liberty
2022	Hawai’i	58–57	SMU	JoVon McClanahan, Hawai’i
2023	Nevada	72–64	Georgia Tech	Jarod Lucas, Nevada
2024	Nebraska	78–66	Oregon State	Brice Williams, Nebraska
2025	Tournament not held			

== Appearances and championships ==
Team	Appearances	Years	Tournament record
Akron	2	2013, 2017	1–5 (1.67)
Arizona	1	2012	3–0 (1.000)
Auburn	2	2011, 2015	2–4 (.333)
Ball State	1	2019	1–2 (.333)
Baylor	1	2010	1–2 (.333)
Boise State	2	2013, 2019	4–2 (.667)
Bucknell	1	2018	2–1 (.667)
Butler	1	2010	3–0 (1.000)
BYU	2	2015, 2021	4–2 (.667)
Charleston	2	2009, 2024	3–3 (.500)
Charlotte	2	2018, 2024	1–5 (.167)
Clemson	1	2011	1–2 (.333)
Colorado	2	2014, 2018	2–4 (.333)
Davidson	1	2017	1–2 (.333)
DePaul	1	2014	0–3 (.000)
East Tennessee State	1	2012	0–3 (.000)
Florida State	1	2010	2–1 (.667)
George Mason	1	2013	1–2 (.333)
George Washington	2	2014, 2022	3–3 (.500)
Georgia Tech	2	2019, 2023	4–2 (.667)
Harvard	1	2015	2–1 (.667)
Hawai'i	12	2009–2019, 2021–2022, 2023–2024	21–20 (.515)
Houston	1	2019	3–0 (1.000)
Illinois State	1	2016	2–1 (.667)
Indiana State	2	2012, 2018	4–2 (.667)
Iona	1	2022	2–1 (.667)
Iowa State	1	2013	3–0 (1.000)
Kansas State	1	2011	3–0 (1.000)
Liberty	1	2021	1–2 (.333)
Long Beach State	1	2011	2–1 (.667)
Loyola Chicago	1	2024	0–3 (.000)
Loyola Marymount	1	2014	1–2 (.333)
Miami (FL)	2	2012, 2017	3–3 (.500)
Middle Tennessee State	1	2017	1–2 (.333)
Mississippi State	1	2010	1–2 (.333)
Murray State	1	2024	1–2 (.333)
Nebraska	2	2014, 2024	5–1 (.833)
Nevada	1	2023	3–0 (1.000)
New Mexico	1	2015	0–3 (.000)
New Mexico State	1	2017	2–1 (.667)
Northeastern	1	2009	1–2 (.333)
Northern Iowa	2	2015, 2021	1–4 (.200)
Oakland	1	2024	1–2 (.333)
Ohio	1	2014	1–2 (.333)
Oklahoma	1	2015	3–0 (1.000)
Old Dominion	1	2023	1–2 (.333)
Ole Miss	1	2012	2–1 (.667)
Oregon State	2	2013, 2024	3–3 (.500)
Pepperdine	1	2022	1–2 (.333)
Portland	2	2019, 2023	0–6 (.000)
Princeton	1	2017	2–1 (.667)
Rhode Island	1	2018	1–2 (.333)
Saint Mary's	2	2009, 2013	2–4 (.333)
San Diego	1	2010	1–2 (.333)
San Diego State	2	2012, 2016	5–1 (.833)
San Francisco	2	2012, 2016	3–3 (.500)
Seattle	1	2022	1–2 (.333)
SMU	2	2009, 2022	2–4 (.333)
South Carolina	1	2013	2–1 (.667)
South Florida	1	2021	1–2 (.333)
Southern Illinois	1	2011	0–3 (.000)
Southern Miss	1	2016	0–3 (.000)
Stanford	1	2021	2–0 (1.000)
Stephen F. Austin	1	2016	1–2 (.333)
TCU	2	2018, 2023	5–1 (.833)
Temple	1	2023	1–2 (.333)
Tulsa	1	2016	1–2 (.333)
UMass	1	2023	2–1 (.667)
UNLV	2	2009, 2018	3–3 (.500)
USC	2	2009, 2017	6–0 (1.000)
Utah	2	2010, 2016	2–4 (.333)
Utah State	1	2022	2–1 (.667)
UTEP	2	2011, 2019	3–3 (.500)
Vanderbilt	1	2021	2–0 (1.000)
Washington	1	2019	2–1 (.667)
Washington State	3	2010, 2015, 2022	4–5 (.444)
Western Michigan	1	2009	2–1 (.667)
Wichita State	1	2014	2–1 (.667)
Wyoming	1	2021	2–1 (.667)
Xavier	1	2011	1–2 (.333)
