= 2009 Diamond Head Classic =

College basketball competition

- Season: 2009–10
- Teams: 8
- Finals site: Stan Sheriff Center, Honolulu, Hawaii
- Champions: USC (1st title)
- Runner-up: UNLV (1st title game)
- Semifinalists: Hawai'i (1st semifinal); Saint Mary's (1st semifinal)
- Winning coach: Kevin O'Neill (1st title)
- MVP: Mike Gerrity (USC)

The 2009 Diamond Head Classic was a mid-season eight-team college basketball tournament played on December 22, 23, and 25 at the Stan Sheriff Center in Honolulu, Hawaii. It was the first annual Diamond Head Classic tournament and was part of the 2009–10 NCAA Division I men's basketball season. USC defeated No. 20-ranked UNLV to win the tournament championship. Mike Gerrity was named the tournament's MVP.

== Bracket ==
5th Place Game; December 25
Western Michigan | 66
Charleston | 63
7th Place Game; December 25
Northeastern | 73
SMU | 62

Consolation 2nd Round; December 23
Northeastern | 60
Western Michigan | 75
SMU | 71
Charleston | 72

First Round; December 22
Northeastern | 67
Saint Mary's | 78
Western Michigan | 51
USC | 55
SMU | 53
UNLV | 67
Charleston | 71
Hawai'i | 84

Semifinals; December 23
Saint Mary's | 49
USC | 60
UNLV | 77
Hawai'i | 53

Championship; December 25
USC | 67
UNLV | 56
3rd Place Game; December 25
Saint Mary's | 84
Hawai'i | 75

== All-tournament team ==
| Name | Position | College | Class |
|---|---|---|---|
| Mike Gerritry | PG | USC | SR |
| Dwain Williams | PG | Hawai'i | SR |
| Omar Samhan | C | Saint Mary's | SR |
| Tre'Von Willis | G | UNLV | JR |
| Marcus Johnson | F | USC | SR |
