= 2015 Diamond Head Classic =

College basketball competition

- Season: 2015–16
- Teams: 8
- Finals site: Stan Sheriff Center; Honolulu, Hawaii
- Champions: Oklahoma (1st title)
- Runner-up: Harvard (1st title game)
- Semifinalists: Auburn (2nd semifinal); Hawai'i (3rd semifinal)
- Winning coach: Lon Kruger (1st title)
- MVP: Buddy Hield (Oklahoma)

The 2015 Diamond Head Classic was a mid-season eight-team college basketball tournament that was played on December 22, 23, and 25 at the Stan Sheriff Center in Honolulu, Hawaii. It was the seventh annual Diamond Head Classic tournament and was part of the 2015–16 NCAA Division I men's basketball season. No. 3-ranked Oklahoma defeated Harvard to win the tournament championship. Buddy Hield was named the tournament's MVP.

== Bracket ==
* – Denotes overtime period

5th Place Game; December 25
BYU	84
Northern Iowa	76
7th Place Game; December 25
New Mexico	59
Washington State	82

Consolation 2nd Round; December 23
New Mexico	66
BYU	96
Washington State	59
Northern Iowa	63

First Round; December 22
Auburn	83
New Mexico	78
BYU	82
Harvard	85*
3	Oklahoma	88
Washington State	60
Northern Iowa	52
Hawai'i	68

Semifinals; December 23
Auburn	51
Harvard	69
3	Oklahoma	84
Hawai'i	81

Championship; December 25
Harvard	71
3	Oklahoma	83
3rd Place Game; December 25
Auburn	67
Hawai'i	79
