= 2016–17 San Diego State Aztecs men's basketball team =

American college basketball season

2016–17 San Diego State Aztecs men's basketball

Diamond Head Classic champions
- Conference: Mountain West Conference
- Record: 19–14 (9–9 MW)
- Head coach: Steve Fisher (18th season)
- Associate head coach: Brian Dutcher
- Assistant coaches: Justin Hutson; Dave Velasquez
- Home arena: Viejas Arena

2016–17 Mountain West Conference men's basketball standings
	Conf.				Overall
Team	W		L	PCT	W		L	PCT
Nevada †	14	–	4	.778	28	–	7	.800
Colorado State	13	–	5	.722	24	–	12	.667
Boise State	12	–	6	.667	20	–	12	.625
Fresno State	11	–	7	.611	20	–	13	.606
New Mexico	10	–	8	.556	17	–	14	.548
San Diego State	9	–	9	.500	19	–	14	.576
Wyoming	8	–	10	.444	23	–	15	.605
San Jose State	7	–	11	.389	14	–	16	.467
Utah State	7	–	11	.389	14	–	17	.452
Air Force	4	–	14	.222	12	–	21	.364
UNLV	4	–	14	.222	11	–	21	.344
† Conference tournament winner

The 2016–17 San Diego State men's basketball team represented San Diego State University during the 2016–17 NCAA Division I men's basketball season. This was head coach Steve Fisher's 18th season at San Diego State. The Aztecs played their home games at Viejas Arena as members in the Mountain West Conference. They finished the season 19–14, 9–9 in Mountain West play to finish in a tie for fifth place. They defeated UNLV and Boise State to advance to the semifinals of the Mountain West tournament where they lost to Colorado State. They Aztecs did not participate in a postseason tournament for the first time since the 2004–05 season.

On April 11, 2017, head coach Steve Fisher announced his retirement after 18 seasons at San Diego State and 27 seasons overall as NCAA head coach, handing over the head coaching job to his longtime assistant Brian Dutcher.

== Previous season ==
The Aztecs finished the 2015–16 season 28–10, 16–2 in Mountain West play to win the Mountain West regular season championship. They defeated Utah State and Nevada to advance to the championship game of the Mountain West tournament where they lost to Fresno State. As a regular season conference champion who failed to win their conference tournament, they received an automatic bid to the National Invitation Tournament where they defeated IPFW, Washington, and Georgia Tech to advance to the tournament semifinals at Madison Square Garden. There, they lost to eventual NIT Champion George Washington.

== Offseason ==
=== Departures ===
Name	Number	Pos.	Height	Weight	Year	Hometown	Notes
Skylar Spencer	0	F	6'10"	240	Senior	Inglewood, CA	Graduated
Angelo Chol	3	F	6'9"	215	RS Senior	San Diego, CA	Graduated
Winston Shepard	13	F	6'8"	210	Senior	Houston, TX	Graduated
Parker U'u	22	G	6'5"	220	RS Junior	Sacramento, CA	Graduate transferred to San Francisco State

=== Incoming transfers ===
Name	Number	Pos.	Height	Weight	Year	Hometown	Notes
Devin Watson	0	G	6'1"	165	Junior	Oceanside, CA	Transferred from San Francisco. Under NCAA transfer rules, Watson will have to sit out for the 2016–17 season. Will have two years of remaining eligibility.
Valentine Izundu	45	C	6'11"	235	RS Senior	Houston, TX	Transferred from Washington State. Will eligible to play since Izundu graduated from Washington State.

=== 2016 recruiting class ===
College recruiting information
Name	Hometown	School	Height	Weight	Commit date
Jalen McDaniels #40 PF	Federal Way, WA	Federal Way High School	6 ft 9 in (2.06 m)	195 lb (88 kg)	Aug 31, 2015
Jalen McDaniels #40 PF	Recruit ratings: Scout: Rivals: 247Sports: ESPN:				
Overall recruit ranking:
Note: In many cases, Scout, Rivals, 247Sports, On3, and ESPN may conflict in their listings of height and weight.; In these cases, the average was taken. ESPN grades are on a 100-point scale.; Sources: "2016 San Diego St. Basketball Commitment List". Rivals.; "2016 San Diego St. Player Commits". ESPN.; "2016 Team Ranking". Rivals.

College recruiting information (2017)
Name	Hometown	School	Height	Weight	Commit date
Adam Seiko #60 PG	Chatsworth, CA	Sierra Canyon High School	6 ft 2 in (1.88 m)	175 lb (79 kg)	Jun 16, 2016
Adam Seiko #60 PG	Recruit ratings: Scout: Rivals: 247Sports: ESPN:				
Overall recruit ranking:
Note: In many cases, Scout, Rivals, 247Sports, On3, and ESPN may conflict in their listings of height and weight.; In these cases, the average was taken. ESPN grades are on a 100-point scale.; Sources: "2017 San Diego St. Basketball Commitment List". Rivals.; "2017 San Diego St. Player Commits". ESPN.; "2017 Team Ranking". Rivals.

== Roster ==
2016–17 San Diego State Aztecs men's basketball team
Players
Coaches

Pos.	#	Name	Height	Weight	Year	Previous school	Hometown
G	0	Devin Watson (redshirt)	6 ft 1 in (1.85 m)	165 lb (75 kg)	Jr	El Camino/San Francisco	Oceanside, California
G	2	Ben Perez (W)	6 ft 3 in (1.91 m)	175 lb (79 kg)	So	USAFA Prep School	San Marcos, California
G	3	Trey Kell	6 ft 4 in (1.93 m)	210 lb (95 kg)	Jr	St. Augustine H.S.	San Diego, California
G	4	Dakarai Allen	6 ft 5 in (1.96 m)	200 lb (91 kg)	Sr	Sheldon H.S.	Sacramento, California
F	5	Jalen McDaniels	6 ft 10 in (2.08 m)	195 lb (88 kg)	Fr	Federal Way H.S.	Federal Way, Washington
F	10	Max Hoetzel	6 ft 9 in (2.06 m)	210 lb (95 kg)	RS So	Wilbraham & Monson/Indiana	Calabasas, California
G	11	D'Erryl Williams	6 ft 3 in (1.91 m)	205 lb (93 kg)	Sr	Sheldon H.S.	Sacramento, California
G	12	Emmanuel Wilson (W)	6 ft 2 in (1.88 m)	185 lb (84 kg)	RS Fr	Plano East Senior H.S.	Dallas, Texas
F	14	Zylan Cheatham	6 ft 9 in (2.06 m)	220 lb (100 kg)	RS So	South Mountain H.S.	Phoenix, Arizona
F	20	Matt Shrigley	6 ft 6 in (1.98 m)	190 lb (86 kg)	RS Sr	La Costa Canyon H.S.	Encinitas, California
F	21	Malik Pope	6 ft 10 in (2.08 m)	220 lb (100 kg)	Jr	Laguna Creek H.S.	Sacramento, California
G	23	Montaque Gill–Caesar	6 ft 6 in (1.98 m)	215 lb (98 kg)	RS So	Huntington Prep School/Missouri	Vaughan, Ontario
C	24	Nolan Narain	6 ft 10 in (2.08 m)	230 lb (104 kg)	RS Fr	La Lumiere School	Hamilton, Ontario
F	33	Niksha Federico (W)	6 ft 7 in (2.01 m)	200 lb (91 kg)	Sr	Cathedral Catholic H.S.	San Diego, California
G	42	Jeremy Hemsley	6 ft 3 in (1.91 m)	190 lb (86 kg)	So	Damien H.S.	La Verne, California
C	45	Valentine Izundu	6 ft 10 in (2.08 m)	240 lb (109 kg)	RS Sr	Lamar Consolidated H.S./Washington State	Houston, Texas

Head coach

- Steve Fisher (Illinois State)

Assistant coach(es)

- Brian Dutcher (Minnesota)
- Justin Hutson (Cal State Bakersfield)
- Dave Velasquez (San Diego State)

Legend

- (C) Team captain
- (S) Suspended
- (I) Ineligible
- (W) Walk-on
- Injured
- Current redshirt

Roster

== Schedule and results ==
Date time, TV	Rank^{#}	Opponent^{#}	Result	Record	Site (attendance) city, state
Exhibition
11/03/2016*; 7:00 pm		UC San Diego	W 76–63		Viejas Arena (12,414); San Diego, CA
11/07/2016*; 7:00 pm		Cal State San Marcos	W 80–42		Viejas Arena (12,414); San Diego, CA
Non-conference regular season
11/11/2016*; 8:00 pm, ESPNU		San Diego; City Championship	W 69–59	1–0	Viejas Arena (12,414); San Diego, CA
11/14/2016*; 9:00 pm, ESPN2		at No. 14 Gonzaga; College Hoops Tip-Off Marathon	L 48–69	1–1	McCarthey Athletic Center (6,000); Spokane, WA
11/16/2016*; 7:00 pm		San Diego Christian	W 81–58	2–1	Viejas Arena (12,414); San Diego, CA
11/21/2016*; 8:00 pm, P12N		vs. California; Sacramento Showcase	W 77–65	3–1	Golden 1 Center (10,104); Sacramento, CA
11/28/2016*; 7:00 pm		Savannah State	W 100–67	4–1	Viejas Arena (12,414); San Diego, CA
12/03/2016*; 1:00 pm, ESPN3		at Loyola–Chicago; MW–MVC Challenge	L 59–65	4–2	Joseph J. Gentile Arena (2,189); Chicago, IL
12/07/2016*; 6:00 pm, KASW		at Grand Canyon	L 72–76	4–3	GCU Arena (7,171); Phoenix, AZ
12/10/2016*; 4:00 pm, CBSSN		Arizona State	L 63–74	4–4	Viejas Arena (12,414); San Diego, CA
12/12/2016*; 7:00 pm		Alabama State	W 73–41	5–4	Viejas Arena (12,414); San Diego, CA
12/22/2016*; 4:00 pm, ESPN2		vs. Southern Miss; Diamond Head Classic quarterfinals	W 66–51	6–4	Stan Sheriff Center (5,942); Honolulu, HI
12/23/2016*; 1:30 pm, ESPN2		vs. Tulsa; Diamond Head Classic semifinals	W 82–63	7–4	Stan Sheriff Center (5,873); Honolulu, HI
12/25/2016*; 5:00 pm, ESPN2		vs. San Francisco; Diamond Head Classic championship	W 62–48	8–4	Stan Sheriff Center (6,119); Honolulu, HI
Mountain West regular season
01/01/2016; 2:00 pm, CBSSN		New Mexico	L 62–68	8–5 (0–1)	Viejas Arena (12,414); San Diego, CA
01/04/2017; 8:00 pm, ESPN2		at Nevada	L 69–72	8–6 (0–2)	Lawlor Events Center (8,461); Reno, NV
01/07/2017; 8:15 pm, ESPNU		at Boise State	L 66–78	8–7 (0–3)	Taco Bell Arena (4,411); Boise, ID
01/10/2017; 8:00 pm, ESPNU		San Jose State	W 76–61	9–7 (1–3)	Viejas Arena (12,414); San Diego, CA
01/14/2017; 7:00 pm, ESPN3		Utah State	W 74–55	10–7 (2–3)	Viejas Arena (12,414); San Diego, CA
01/17/2017; 7:00 pm, ESPN3		at UNLV	W 64–51	11–7 (3–3)	Thomas & Mack Center (10,007); Paradise, NV
01/24/2017; 6:00 pm, ESPN3		at Air Force	L 57–60	11–8 (3–4)	Clune Arena (1,705); Colorado Springs, CO
01/28/2017; 3:00 pm, CBSSN		Colorado State	L 77–78	11–9 (3–5)	Viejas Arena (11,881); San Diego, CA
02/01/2017; 8:00 pm, CBSSN		Wyoming	W 77–68	12–9 (4–5)	Viejas Arena (11,883); San Diego, CA
02/04/2017; 4:00 pm, ESPN3		at Fresno State	W 70–67	13–9 (5–5)	Save Mart Center (8,882); Fresno, CA
02/08/2017; 8:00 pm, CBSSN		at San Jose State	L 71–76	13–10 (5–6)	Event Center Arena (3,107); San Jose, CA
02/11/2017; 1:00 pm, CBSSN		Nevada	W 70–56	14–10 (6–6)	Viejas Arena (11,697); San Diego, CA
02/15/2017; 7:00 pm, CBSSN		at Utah State	W 66–62	15–10 (7–6)	Smith Spectrum (6,427); Logan, UT
02/19/2017; 1:00 pm, CBSSN		UNLV	W 77–64	16–10 (8–6)	Viejas Arena (11,896); San Diego, CA
02/22/2017; 8:00 pm, CBSSN		Fresno State	L 55–63	16–11 (8–7)	Viejas Arena (12,029); San Diego, CA
02/25/2017; 5:00 pm, CBSSN		at Colorado State	L 55–56	16–12 (8–8)	Moby Arena (7,856); Fort Collins, CO
03/01/2017; 7:00 pm, CBSSN		Air Force	W 51–38	17–12 (9–8)	Viejas Arena (12,044); San Diego, CA
03/04/2017; 7:00 pm, CBSSN		at New Mexico	L 59–64	17–13 (9–9)	The Pit (13,958); Albuquerque, NM
Mountain West tournament
03/08/2017; 4:00 pm, MWN	(6)	at (11) UNLV; First round	W 62–52 ^{OT}	18–13	Thomas & Mack Center (4,979); Paradise, NV
03/09/2017; 8:30 pm, CBSSN	(6)	vs. (3) Boise State; Quarterfinals	W 87–68	19–13	Thomas & Mack Center (5,057); Paradise, NV
03/10/2017; 9:30 pm, CBSSN	(6)	vs. (2) Colorado State; Semifinals	L 63–71	19–14	Thomas & Mack Center (5,602); Paradise, NV
*Non-conference game. ^{#}Rankings from AP Poll. (#) Tournament seedings in parentheses. All times are in Pacific Time.
