= 2012–13 Miami Hurricanes men's basketball team =

American college basketball season

2012–13 Miami Hurricanes men's basketball

ACC Regular Season Champions ACC tournament champions

NCAA tournament, Sweet Sixteen
- Conference: Atlantic Coast Conference

Ranking
- Coaches: No. 10
- AP: No. 5
- Record: 29–7 (15–3 ACC)
- Head coach: Jim Larrañaga (2nd season)
- Assistant coaches: Eric Konkol; Michael Huger; Chris Caputo
- Home arena: BankUnited Center

2012–13 ACC men's basketball standings
	Conf.				Overall
Team	W		L	PCT	W		L	PCT
No. 5 Miami (FL) †	15	–	3	.833	29	–	7	.806
No. 6 Duke	14	–	4	.778	30	–	6	.833
North Carolina	12	–	6	.667	25	–	11	.694
Virginia	11	–	7	.611	23	–	12	.657
NC State	11	–	7	.611	24	–	11	.686
Florida State	9	–	9	.500	18	–	16	.529
Maryland	8	–	10	.444	25	–	13	.658
Boston College	7	–	11	.389	16	–	17	.485
Georgia Tech	6	–	12	.333	16	–	15	.516
Wake Forest	6	–	12	.333	13	–	18	.419
Clemson	5	–	13	.278	13	–	18	.419
Virginia Tech	4	–	14	.222	13	–	19	.406
† 2013 ACC tournament winner As of April 2, 2013; Rankings from AP Poll

The 2012–13 Miami Hurricanes men's basketball team represented the University of Miami during the 2012–13 NCAA Division I men's basketball season. The Hurricanes, led by second-year head coach Jim Larrañaga, played their home games at the Bank United Center and were members of the Atlantic Coast Conference. With a veteran roster, the Hurricanes finished the regular season with a conference record of 15–3 and won the ACC regular season championship, marking the program's first-ever outright regular season conference championship.

The Hurricanes entered the ACC tournament as the top-seed and received a first-round bye. After defeating Boston College and NC State, they beat North Carolina to capture the 2013 ACC tournament championship, becoming the first ACC school other than Duke or North Carolina to win both the ACC regular season and tournament championships in the same season since the 1974 NC State team. The Hurricanes were selected as a 2-seed in the South Region of the 2013 NCAA tournament and beat 15-seed Pacific in the second round. The Hurricanes beat 7-seed Illinois in the third round to advance to the sweet sixteen, where they lost to Marquette. They finished the season 29–7, their most victories in a season. They would tie this number of wins ten years later.

== Previous season ==
The Hurricanes finished the 2011–12 season 20–13 overall, 9–7 in ACC play, and lost in the second round of the NIT to Minnesota.

=== Departures ===
Departures
Name	Number	Pos.	Height	Weight	Year	Hometown	Reason for departure
Malcolm Grant	3	G	6'1"	188	Senior	Brooklyn, NY	Graduated
DeQuan Jones	5	G/F	6'8"	221	Senior	Stone Mountain, GA	Graduated
Ryan Quigtar	11	G	5'11"	180	Senior	Skyway, WA	Graduated

=== 2012 recruiting class ===
College recruiting
Name	Hometown	School	Height	Weight	Commit date
Tonye Jekiri; C	Hialeah, FL	Champagnat Catholic (FL)	6 ft 11 in (2.11 m)	230 lb (100 kg)	Oct 31, 2011
Tonye Jekiri; C	Recruit ratings: Scout: Rivals: (91)				
Overall recruit ranking:
Note: In many cases, Scout, Rivals, 247Sports, On3, and ESPN may conflict in their listings of height and weight.; In these cases, the average was taken. ESPN grades are on a 100-point scale.; Sources: "Miami Hurricanes 2012 Basketball Commitments". Rivals.; "ESPN". ESPN.; "2012 Team Ranking". Rivals.

== Roster ==
2012–13 Miami Hurricanes men's basketball team
Players
Coaches

Pos.	#	Name	Height	Weight	Year	Hometown
G	0	Shane Larkin	5 ft 11 in (1.8 m)	176 lb (80 kg)	So	Cincinnati, OH
G	1	Durand Scott	6 ft 5 in (1.96 m)	203 lb (92 kg)	Sr	Bronx, NY
G	2	Bishop Daniels	6 ft 3 in (1.91 m)	175 lb (79 kg)	RS Fr	Raleigh, NC
G	3	Steve Sorenson (W)	6 ft 0 in (1.83 m)	151 lb (68 kg)	Fr	Dallas, TX
G	4	Trey McKinney-Jones	6 ft 5 in (1.96 m)	220 lb (100 kg)	RS Sr	Milwaukee, WI
F	10	Raphael Akpejiori	6 ft 10 in (2.08 m)	236 lb (107 kg)	Jr	Lagos, Nigeria
G	12	Justin Heller (W)	6 ft 2 in (1.88 m)	180 lb (82 kg)	Jr	Boca Raton, FL
G	15	Rion Brown	6 ft 6 in (1.98 m)	200 lb (91 kg)	Jr	Hinesville, GA
F	21	Erik Swoope	6 ft 6 in (1.98 m)	233 lb (106 kg)	Jr	Lake Elsinore, CA
C	23	Tonye Jekiri	7 ft 0 in (2.13 m)	227 lb (103 kg)	Fr	Hialeah, FL
G	25	Garrius Adams (redshirt)	6 ft 6 in (1.98 m)	195 lb (88 kg)	Sr	Apex, NC
F	35	Kenny Kadji	6 ft 11 in (2.11 m)	242 lb (110 kg)	RS Sr	Douala, Cameroon
C	42	Reggie Johnson	6 ft 10 in (2.08 m)	292 lb (132 kg)	Sr	Winston-Salem, NC
C	45	Julian Gamble	6 ft 10 in (2.08 m)	250 lb (113 kg)	Sr	Durham, NC

Head coach

- Jim Larrañaga (Providence)

Assistant coach(es)

- Eric Konkol (Wisconsin-Eau Claire)
- Michael Huger (Bowling Green)
- Chris Caputo (Westfield State)

Legend

- (C) Team captain
- (S) Suspended
- (I) Ineligible
- (W) Walk-on
- Injured
- Current redshirt

Roster
Last update: October 29, 2015

== Schedule and results ==
Date time, TV	Rank^{#}	Opponent^{#}	Result	Record	High points	High rebounds	High assists	Site (attendance) city, state
Exhibition
Nov 2, 2012*; 7:00 pm		Saint Leo	L 67–69	–	19 – McKinney-Jones	6 – McKinney-Jones	3 – Larkin	BankUnited Center (2,282); Coral Gables, FL
Non-conference regular season
Nov 9, 2012*; 5:30 pm, ESPN3		Stetson	W 87–79	1–0	22 – Johnson	12 – Kadji	6 – Larkin	BankUnited Center (3,160); Coral Gables, FL
Nov 13, 2012*; 7:05 pm		at Florida Gulf Coast	L 51–63	1–1	14 – Larkin	10 – Johnson	4 – Larkin	Alico Arena (4,552); Fort Myers, FL
Nov 16, 2012*; 7:00 pm, RSN		Jacksonville	W 73–57	2–1	27 – Larkin	7 – Brown	5 – Larkin	BankUnited Center (3,135); Coral Gables, FL
Nov 24, 2012*; 2:00 pm, ESPN3		Detroit	W 77–62	3–1	15 – Tied	11 – Kadji	3 – Tied	BankUnited Center (2,946); Coral Gables, FL
Nov 28, 2012*; 7:30 pm, ESPN		No. 13 Michigan State; ACC-Big Ten Challenge	W 67–59	4–1	18 – McKinney-Jones	11 – Johnson	2 – Tied	BankUnited Center (5,791); Coral Gables, FL
Dec 1, 2012*; 2:00 pm, CBSSN		at UMass	W 75–62	5–1	19 – Johnson	13 – Johnson	4 – Scott	Mullins Center (7,004); Amherst, MA
Dec 4, 2012*; 7:00 pm, RSN		Charlotte	W 77–46	6–1	17 – Kadji	12 – Scott	5 – Larkin	BankUnited Center (3,275); Coral Gables, FL
Dec 18, 2012*; 8:00 pm, CBSSN		at UCF	W 72–50	7–1	17 – Scott	13 – Johnson	6 – Larkin	UCF Arena (5,189); Orlando, FL
Dec 23, 2012*; 12:30 am, ESPNU		at Hawaii; Diamond Head Classic First Round	W 73–58	8–1	20 – Scott	13 – Gamble	5 – Scott	Stan Sheriff Center (8,120); Honolulu, HI
Dec 23, 2012*; 11:30 pm, ESPN2		vs. No. 4 Arizona; Diamond Head Classic Semifinals	L 50–69	8–2	19 – Kadji	4 – Tied	3 – Larkin	Stan Sheriff Center (6,564); Honolulu, HI
Dec 25, 2012*; 7:30 pm, ESPN2		vs. Indiana State; Diamond Head Classic 3rd Place	L 55–57 ^{OT}	8–3	13 – Kadji	11 – McKinney-Jones	4 – Larkin	Stan Sheriff Center (6,514); Honolulu, HI
Jan 2, 2013*; 9:00 pm, RSN		La Salle	W 76–59	9–3	18 – Tied	11 – Kadji	3 – Larkin	BankUnited Center (3,259); Coral Gables, FL
ACC regular season
Jan 5, 2013; 2:30 pm, ACCN		at Georgia Tech	W 62–49	10–3 (1–0)	22 – Brown	14 – Kadji	6 – Larkin	McCamish Pavilion (7,614); Atlanta, GA
Jan 10, 2013; 7:00 pm, ESPN		at North Carolina	W 68–59	11–3 (2–0)	18 – Kadji	9 – Kadji	5 – Scott	Dean E. Smith Center (20,516); Chapel Hill, NC
Jan 13, 2013; 8:00 pm, ESPNU		Maryland	W 54–47	12–3 (3–0)	14 – Kadji	9 – Gamble	7 – McKinney-Jones	BankUnited Center (5,809); Coral Gables, FL
Jan 16, 2013; 7:00 pm, RSN		at Boston College	W 60–59	13–3 (4–0)	15 – Scott	6 – Larkin	5 – Larkin	Conte Forum (3,624); Chestnut Hill, MA
Jan 23, 2013; 7:00 pm, ESPN	No. 25	No. 1 Duke	W 90–63	14–3 (5–0)	25 – Scott	10 – Tied	5 – Larkin	BankUnited Center (7,972); Coral Gables, FL
Jan 27, 2013; 6:00 pm, ESPNU	No. 25	Florida State	W 71–47	15–3 (6–0)	15 – McKinney-Jones	9 – Larkin	6 – Larkin	BankUnited Center (7,972); Coral Gables, FL
Jan 30, 2013; 9:00 pm, RSN	No. 14	at Virginia Tech	W 73–64	16–3 (7–0)	25 – Larkin	10 – Johnson	4 – McKinney-Jones	Cassell Coliseum (5,436); Blacksburg, VA
Feb 2, 2013; 4:00 pm, CBS	No. 14	at No. 19 NC State	W 79–78	17–3 (8–0)	18 – Scott	8 – Johnson	5 – Larkin	PNC Arena (19,557); Raleigh, NC
Feb 5, 2013; 7:00 pm, RSN	No. 8	Boston College	W 72–50	18–3 (9–0)	22 – Brown	9 – Johnson	5 – Larkin	BankUnited Center (5,149); Coral Gables, FL
Feb 9, 2013; 2:00 pm, ESPN	No. 8	North Carolina	W 87–61	19–3 (10–0)	18 – Larkin	6 – Tied	9 – Larkin	BankUnited Center (7,971); Coral Gables, FL
Feb 13, 2013; 7:00 pm, ESPN2	No. 3	at Florida State	W 74–68	20–3 (11–0)	22 – Larkin	8 – Johnson	4 – Larkin	Donald L. Tucker Civic Center (9,007); Tallahassee, FL
Feb 17, 2013; 6:00 pm, ESPNU	No. 3	at Clemson	W 45–43	21–3 (12–0)	12 – Kadji	11 – Scott	3 – Larkin	Littlejohn Coliseum (8,998); Clemson, SC
Feb 19, 2013; 9:00 pm, ESPNU	No. 2	Virginia	W 54–50	22–3 (13–0)	11 – Larkin	7 – Tied	6 – Larkin	BankUnited Center (7,972); Coral Gables, FL
Feb 23, 2013; 1:00 pm, RSN	No. 2	at Wake Forest	L 65–80	22–4 (13–1)	17 – Scott	6 – Tied	3 – Larkin	LJVM Coliseum (12,037); Winston-Salem, NC
Feb 27, 2013; 7:00 pm, RSN	No. 5	Virginia Tech	W 76–58	23–4 (14–1)	22 – Larkin	8 – Johnson	6 – Larkin	BankUnited Center (7,434); Coral Gables, FL
Mar 2, 2013; 6:00 pm, ESPN	No. 5	at No. 3 Duke	L 76–79	23–5 (14–2)	25 – Larkin	10 – Kadji	4 – Larkin	Cameron Indoor Stadium (9,314); Durham, NC
Mar 6, 2013; 9:00 pm, ACCN	No. 6	Georgia Tech	L 69–71	23–6 (14–3)	18 – Kadji	11 – Kadji	7 – Larkin	BankUnited Center (7,394); Coral Gables, FL
Mar 9, 2013; 2:30 pm, ACCN	No. 6	Clemson	W 62–49	24–6 (15–3)	23 – Kadji	12 – Kadji	3 – Larkin	BankUnited Center (7,972); Coral Gables, FL
ACC tournament
Mar 15, 2013; 12:00 pm, ESPN2	No. 9 (1)	vs. (8) Boston College; Quarterfinals	W 69–58	25–6	20 – Larkin	11 – Kadji	4 – Larkin	Greensboro Coliseum (22,169); Greensboro, NC
Mar 16, 2013; 1:00 pm, ESPN2	No. 9 (1)	vs. (5) NC State; Semifinals	W 81–71	26–6	32 – Scott	9 – Kadji	4 – Tied	Greensboro Coliseum (22,169); Greensboro, NC
Mar 17, 2013; 1:00 pm, ESPN	No. 9 (1)	vs. (3) North Carolina; Championship	W 87–77	27–6	28 – Larkin	10 – Gamble	7 – Larkin	Greensboro Coliseum (22,169); Greensboro, NC
NCAA tournament
Mar 22, 2013; 2:10 pm, TNT	No. 5 (2 E)	vs. (15 E) Pacific; Second Round	W 78–49	28–6	21 – Scott	10 – Johnson	9 – Larkin	Frank Erwin Center (13,784); Austin, TX
Mar 24, 2013; 9:04 pm, TNT	No. 5 (2 E)	vs. (7 E) Illinois; Third Round	W 63–59	29–6	21 – Brown	8 – Kadji	5 – Larkin	Frank Erwin Center (14,520); Austin, TX
Mar 28, 2013; 7:15 pm, CBS	No. 5 (2 E)	vs. No. 15 (3 E) Marquette; Sweet Sixteen	L 61–71	29–7	14 – Larkin	7 – Scott	5 – Scott	Verizon Center (19,731); Washington, D.C.
*Non-conference game. ^{#}Rankings from AP Poll. (#) Tournament seedings in parentheses. All times are in Eastern Time. (#) during NCAA Tournament is Seed with Region E=East.

== Rankings ==
Ranking movements Legend: ██ Increase in ranking ██ Decrease in ranking — = Not ranked RV = Received votes т = Tied with team above or below ( ) = First-place votes
	Week																				
Poll	Pre	1	2	3	4	5	6	7	8	9	10	11	12	13	14	15	16	17	18	19	Final
AP Poll	RV	RV	—	—	RV	RV	RV	—	—	—	RV	25	14	8	3 (17)	2 (20)	5	6	9	5	Not released
Coaches' Poll	RV	—	—	—	RV	—	—	—	—	—	RV	RV	15	11	4 (5)	2 (7)	7	7	10	4т	10
