= Mike Gerrity =

American basketball player and coach (born 1986)

Cleveland Cavaliers
- Title: Assistant coach
- League: NBA

Personal information
- Born: August 14, 1986 (age 40) Yorba Linda, California, U.S.
- Listed height: 6 ft 1 in (1.85 m)
- Listed weight: 190 lb (86 kg)

Career information
- High school: Mater Dei (CA)
- College: Pepperdine (2005-07); Charlotte (2007-09); USC (2009-10)
- NBA draft: 2010: undrafted
- Playing career: 2010–2012
- Position: Point guard
- Coaching career: 2013–present

Career history

Playing
- 2010: Dakota Wizards
- 2011-2012: Erie BayHawks
- 2012: Maine Red Claws

Coaching
- 2013–2016: Cleveland Cavaliers (Assistant video coordinator)
- 2016–2018: Canton Charge (Director of Player Development)
- 2018–2021: Cleveland Cavaliers (Director of Player Development, Assistant coach)
- 2022–2023: Cleveland Charge
- 2024–present: Cleveland Cavaliers (Assistant coach)

Career highlights
- As player: 1x WCC All-Freshman team (2006); 1x Diamond Head Classic MVP (2010); 1x Diamond Head Classic All- Tournament Team (2010); As coach: NBA champion (2016)

Michael Andrew Gerrity (born August 14, 1986) is an American professional basketball coach and former player who currently serves as an assistant coach for the Cleveland Cavaliers of the National Basketball Association (NBA). Gerrity has spent his entire NBA coaching career with the Cavaliers and their G-League affiliates. Gerrity served as head coach of the Cleveland Charge, the Cavaliers’ NBA G League affiliate from 2022 until 2024.

== Personal life ==
Gerrity was born August 14, 1986, in Yorba Linda, California. Gerrity attended Mater Dei High School. He played collegiate basketball at Pepperdine University, University of North Carolina at Charlotte, and the University of Southern California (USC). He earned a bachelor’s degree in sociology from USC.

== Coaching career ==
=== Cleveland Cavaliers ===
Gerrity joined the Cavaliers in 2013, originally as an assistant video coordinator. Gerrity was a part of the 2016 NBA Finals coaching staff. He later took a job with the Cavs G-league affiliate in 2016. Gerrity returned to the Cavs in 2018, being named the team's director of player development and assistant coach. He later dropped the director of player development role and is now just an assistant coach since 2021. Gerrity stepped away from the team again in 2022, to become the head coach of the Cleveland Charge. He returned to the Cavs 2024 as an assistant coach.

=== Canton/Cleveland Charge ===
Gerrity was hired by then named Canton Charge the Cavaliers NBA G League affiliate as their director of player development in 2016. He carried this role until he returned to the Cavaliers in 2018. On September 8, 2022, the Cleveland Charge, named Gerrity as their next head coach. Gerrity returned to the Cavaliers as an assistant coach in 2024.

== College career ==
=== Pepperdine ===
After graduation, Gerrity attended Pepperdine. During his freshman year in 2005, Gerrity appeared in all 21 games and started all 21. He averaged 14.1 points per game, shooting a 41.2% field goal percentage. He was named to the West Coast Conference all-Freshman team in 2006. Gerrity only appeared in one game during the 2006-07 season and transferred to Charlotte.

=== Charlotte ===
Gerrity transferred to the Charlotte in 2007. He appeared in 26 games, while only starting 4, averaging 4.7 points per game on 39% shooting. After just one season, Gerrity transferred to the University of Southern California, prior to his transfer, Gerrity almost transferred to Biola University.

=== USC ===
In 2008, Gerrity transferred to the University of Southern California for his senior year. Gerrity started all 22 games his senior year, averaging 9.3 points per game on 39.6% shooting. Gerrity was named MVP of the 2009 Diamond Head Classic, scoring 17 points in two separate contests against Western Michigan and Saint Mary's, and helped the Trojans defeated the No. 20 UNLV 67-56. On December 28. 2009 Gerrity was named the Pac-10 Player of the Week, averaging 15.7 points, 2.3 assists, 3.0 rebounds and 1.3 steals in the three games, while shooting 62.1%.

== Professional career ==
After graduating from USC, Gerrity declared for the 2010 NBA Draft and went undrafted. He was selected 105th overall in the 2010 NBA D-League Draft.

=== Dakota Wizards (2010) ===
After going undrafted in the NBA, Gerrity was selected 105th overall in the 2010 NBA D-League Draft by the Dakota Wizards. In 11 games with the Wizards, Gerrity averages 2.2 points per game, 1.6 rebounds per game and 2.8 assists per game. He was released by the Wizards on December 21, 2010.

=== Erie BayHawks (2011–2012) ===
In December 2011, Gerrity was acquired by the Erie BayHawks. During the 2011–12 season, he was waived and re-acquired multiple times during the season as part of standard D-League roster movement.

=== Maine Red Claws (2012) ===
In February 2012, Gerrity was acquired by the Maine Red Claws from the available player pool. With Maine, he provided depth at point guard and posted one of the team’s best assist-to-turnover ratios. He averaged 7.3 points per game in 18 total games during the 2011–12 season prior to his final waiver.

=== Retirement from Playing Career ===
Following the 2011–12 season, Gerrity retired from professional playing and transitioned into coaching and basketball operations, joining the Cleveland Cavaliers organization in 2013 as an assistant video coordinator, beginning his rise through NBA coaching and player development ranks.
