= 2009–10 USC Trojans men's basketball team =

American college basketball season

2009–10 USC Trojans men's basketball

Diamond Head Classic Champions
- Conference: Pacific-10 Conference
- Record: 16–14 (8–10 Pac-10)
- Head coach: Kevin O'Neill
- Home arena: Galen Center

2009–10 Pacific-10 Conference men's basketball standings
| | Conf. | | | | Overall |
| Team | W | | L | PCT | W | | L | PCT |
|---|---|---|---|---|---|---|---|---|
| California | 13 | – | 5 | .722 | 24 | – | 11 | .686 |
| Arizona State | 12 | – | 6 | .667 | 22 | – | 11 | .667 |
| Washington † | 11 | – | 7 | .611 | 26 | – | 10 | .722 |
| Arizona | 10 | – | 8 | .556 | 16 | – | 15 | .516 |
| USC* | 8 | – | 10 | .444 | 16 | – | 14 | .533 |
| Oregon State | 8 | – | 10 | .444 | 14 | – | 18 | .438 |
| UCLA | 8 | – | 10 | .444 | 14 | – | 18 | .438 |
| Stanford | 7 | – | 11 | .389 | 14 | – | 17 | .452 |
| Oregon | 7 | – | 11 | .389 | 16 | – | 16 | .500 |
| Washington State | 6 | – | 12 | .333 | 16 | – | 15 | .516 |
† Conference tournament winner As of March 25, 2010; Rankings from AP Poll * Ineligible for conference tournament

The 2009–10 USC Trojans men's basketball team represented the University of Southern California in the 2009–10 NCAA Division I men's basketball season. The Trojans are a member of the Pacific-10 Conference. USC finished the season 16–14 and 8–10 in the Pac-10 but did not participate in the 2010 Pacific-10 Conference men's basketball tournament due to self-imposed sanctions.

== Offseason ==
- June 9: Head coach, Tim Floyd, has resigned. His letter of resignation was published by the Clarion-Ledger newspaper in Mississippi. USC Athletic Director Mike Garrett accepted the resignation and said that he will quickly begin the search for a new head basketball coach. Kevin O'Neill was named the new head coach of the men's basketball team.

== Regular season ==
- In the early signing period, USC received four letter-of-intents for the next season: guard Bryce Jones (Woodland Hils, Calif./William Howard Taft), guard Maurice Jones (Saginaw, Mich./Arthur Hill), forward Curtis Washington of Elizabethtown, Ky./Elizabethtown) and forward Garrett Jackson (Portland, Ore./Westview). USC also is expecting Dwayne Polee (Los Angeles/Westchester to sign.
- On January 3, 2010, USC Athletic Director Mike Garrett announced that the school is forfeiting the 2007–08 season's victories, not participating in this year's post season tournaments, and reducing the number of scholarships for two years for violation of NCAA rules.
- January 4, 2010 – Rory Markas, play-by-play voice for the USC men's basketball team, died.

=== Class of 2009 ===
College recruiting
| Name | Hometown | School | Height | Weight | Commit date |
|---|---|---|---|---|---|
| Evan Smith; SF | Calabasas, CA | Calabasas HS | 6 ft 7 in (2.01 m) | 225 lb (102 kg) | |
| Evan Smith; SF | Recruit ratings: Scout: Rivals: 247Sports: (78) | | | | |
| Tyler Sugiyama; PG | Winnetka, IL | New Trier High School | 5 ft 10 in (1.78 m) | 150 lb (68 kg) | |
| Tyler Sugiyama; PG | Recruit ratings: No ratings found | | | | |
| Davis Rozitis; C | Cesis, Latvia | Cesis State Grammar School | 7 ft 0 in (2.13 m) | 240 lb (110 kg) | |
| Davis Rozitis; C | Recruit ratings: No ratings found | | | | |
| Daniel Munoz; G | Coto de Caza, CA | Santa Margarita | 5 ft 10 in (1.78 m) | 175 lb (79 kg) | |
| Daniel Munoz; G | Recruit ratings: No ratings found | | | | |
Overall Recruiting Rankings: Scout – UR Rivals – UR ESPN – UR

== Roster ==
| Number | Name | Height | Position | Class |
| 0 | Marcus Johnson | 6–6 | F | SR |
| 1 | Alex Stepheson | 6–9 | F | JR |
| 2 | Ryan Wetherell | 5–11 | G | JR |
| 4 | Leonard Washington | 6–7 | F | SO |
| 5 | Nikola Vucevic | 6–10 | F | SO |
| 10 | Tyler Sugiyama | 5–10 | G | FR |
| 13 | Davis Rozitis | 7–0 | F–C | FR |
| 14 | Donte Smith | 5–11 | G | JR |
| 15 | Percy Miller | 5–11 | G | SO |
| 20 | Marcus Simmons | 6–6 | G | JR |
| 21 | Dwight Lewis | 6–5 | G | SR |
| 22 | Evan Smith | 6–7 | F | FR |
| 33 | Jordan Cameron | 6–5 | F | JR |
| 34 | Korri Ennis | 6–0 | G | SO |
| 35 | Daniel Munoz | 5–10 | G | FR |
| 43 | Kasey Cunningham | 6–7 | F | JR |

=== Schedule ===
| Date | Location | Opponent | Result | Score | Record | Pac-10 Record |
| 11/17/2009 (usctrojans.com) | Galen Center – Los Angeles, CA | UC Riverside | W | 77–67 | 1–0 | |
| 11/21/2009 (usctrojans.com) | Galen Center – Los Angeles, CA | Loyola Marymount | L | 67–59 | 1–1 | |
| 11/27/2009 (usctrojans.com) | Galen Center – Los Angeles, CA | Coppin State | W | 74–43 | 2–1 | |
| 11/29/2009 (FSN) | Galen Center – Los Angeles, CA | Nebraska | L | 51–48 | 2–2 | |
| 12/3/2009 (ESPN2) | Frank Erwin Center – Austin, TX – Big 12/Pac-10 Hardwood Series | #2 Texas | L | 50–69 | 2–3 | |
| 12/5/2009 (FSS) | Alexander Memorial Coliseum – Atlanta, GA | #23 Georgia Tech | L | 79–53 | 2–4 | |
| 12/8/2009 (usctrojans.com) | Galen Center – Los Angeles, CA | Sacramento State | W | 51–36 | 3–4 | |
| 12/11/2009 (usctrojans.com) | Galen Center – Los Angeles, CA | Idaho State | W | 59–53 | 4–4 | |
| 12/19/2009 (FSN) | Galen Center – Los Angeles, CA | #8 Tennessee | W | 77–55 | 5–4 | |
| 12/22/2009 (ESPNU) | Stan Sheriff Center – Honolulu, HI – Diamond Head Classic | Western Michigan | W | 55–51 | 6–4 | |
| 12/23/2009 (ESPNU) | Stan Sheriff Center – Honolulu, HI – Diamond Head Classic | Saint Mary's | W | 60–49 | 7–4 | |
| 12/25/2009 (ESPN2) | Stan Sheriff Center – Honolulu, HI – Diamond Head Classic | #20 UNLV | W | 67–56 | 8–4 | |
| 12/31/2009 (Prime Ticket) | Galen Center – Los Angeles, CA | Arizona | W | 56–50 | 9–4 | 1–0 |
| 1/2/2010 (Prime Ticket) | Galen Center – Los Angeles, CA | Arizona State | W | 47–37 | 10–4 | 2–0 |
| 1/6/2010 | Maples Pavilion – Stanford, CA | Stanford | L | 54–53 | 10–5 | 2–1 |
| 1/9/2010 (FSN) | Haas Pavilion – Berkeley, CA | California | L | 67–59 | 10–6 | 2–2 |
| 1/16/2010 (Prime Ticket) | Pauley Pavilion – Los Angeles, CA | UCLA | W | 67–46 | 11–6 | 3–2 |
| 1/21/2010 (usctrojans.com Delayed) | Galen Center – Los Angeles, CA | Washington State | L | 67–60 | 11–7 | 3–3 |
| 1/23/2010 (FSN West) | Galen Center – Los Angeles, CA | Washington | W | 87–61 | 12–7 | 4–3 |
| 1/28/2010 | Gill Coliseum – Corvallis, OR | Oregon State | L | 51–45 | 12–8 | 4–4 |
| 1/30/2010 | McArthur Court – Eugene, OR | Oregon | L | 67–57 | 12–9 | 4–5 |
| 2/4/2010 (usctrojans.com Delayed) | Galen Center – Los Angeles, CA | California | W | 66–63 | 13–9 | 5–5 |
| 2/6/2010 (Prime Ticket) | Galen Center – Los Angeles, CA | Stanford | W | 54–49 | 14–9 | 6–5 |
| 2/14/2010 (FSN) | Galen Center – Los Angeles, CA | UCLA | W | 68–64 | 15–9 | 7–5 |
| 2/18/2010 (Prime Ticket) | Bank of America Arena – Seattle, WA | Washington | W | 67–64 | 16–9 | 8–5 |
| 2/20/2010 | Beasley Coliseum – Pullman, WA | Washington State | L | 51–47 | 16–10 | 8–6 |
| 2/25/2010 (usctrojans.com Delayed) | Galen Center – Los Angeles, CA | Oregon | L | 54–44 | 16–11 | 8–7 |
| 2/27/2010 (Prime Ticket) | Galen Center – Los Angeles, CA | Oregon State | L | 49–44 | 16–12 | 8–8 |
| 3/4/2010 (FSN) | Wells Fargo Arena – Tempe, AZ | Arizona State | L | 59–54 | 16–13 | 8–9 |
| 3/7/2010 | McKale Center – Tucson, AZ | Arizona | L | 86–84 | 16–14 | 8–10 |
Rankings reflect the USA Today Coaches Poll.

== Players drafted into the NBA ==
| Round | Pick | Player | NBA Club |
