= Cleveland Charge =

American professional basketball team of the NBA G League

- Conference: Eastern
- League: NBA G League
- Founded: 2001
- History: Huntsville Flight; 2001–2005; Albuquerque Thunderbirds; 2005–2010; New Mexico Thunderbirds; 2010–2011; Canton Charge; 2011–2021; Cleveland Charge; 2021–present
- Arena: Public Auditorium
- Location: Cleveland, Ohio
- Team colors: Wine, gold, black, white
- General manager: Liron Fanan
- Head coach: Eli Kell-Abrams
- Ownership: Cleveland Cavaliers
- Affiliation: Cleveland Cavaliers
- Championships: 1 (2006)
- Division/conference titles: 1 (2013)
- Website: cleveland.gleague.nba.com

The Cleveland Charge are an American professional basketball team in the NBA G League based in Cleveland. They are affiliated with the Cleveland Cavaliers, and play their home games at Public Auditorium in downtown Cleveland, though to begin the 2024–25 season, home games were played at Rocket Arena (home of the Cavaliers) due to renovations at Public Auditorium.

The franchise was founded in 2001 as the Huntsville Flight, based in Huntsville, Alabama, before moving to Albuquerque, New Mexico, in 2005, where they were known as the Albuquerque Thunderbirds until 2010. After playing the 2010–11 season in suburban Rio Rancho as the New Mexico Thunderbirds, the franchise was purchased by the Cavaliers and relocated to Canton, Ohio, where they played as the Canton Charge through the 2020–21 season.

The team has made the championship finals twice, once when playing in Huntsville and the other time when playing in Albuquerque; the team lost in 2004 and won the title in 2006. Since the move to Ohio, they have reached the semifinal round three times in 2012, 2015, and 2016. They are one of three surviving teams from the original eight that first played in the 2001–02 season, and are also one of only four teams to reach the playoffs at least ten times in league history.

== History ==
=== Huntsville ===
The team was formed in 2001 as the Huntsville Flight based in Huntsville, Alabama, as a founding member of the NBA Development League, the affiliate minor league of the National Basketball Association (NBA). They played home games at the Von Braun Center. In their first two seasons, they failed to make the playoffs, but in their third they reached the NBA D-League Finals, losing to the Asheville Altitude. The team ended its tenure in Alabama at the conclusion of the 2004–05 season after finishing third in the league and making the playoffs. The Flight were not affiliated with an NBA team.

=== Albuquerque ===
The team moved to Albuquerque, New Mexico, and became the Albuquerque Thunderbirds beginning in the 2005–06 season. They played home games at Tingley Coliseum. In their first season in New Mexico, the team won the 2006 NBA D-League Championship by defeating the Fort Worth Flyers in the championship game. In the 2006–07 season, they again made the playoffs, but were defeated by the Colorado 14ers. The Thunderbirds moved in 2010 to the Santa Ana Star Center in suburban Rio Rancho and were re-branded as the New Mexico Thunderbirds. They played just one season in Rio Rancho, finishing ninth and failing to make the playoffs for the fourth consecutive season. The Thunderbirds were affiliates of the Cleveland Cavaliers, Dallas Mavericks, Indiana Pacers, Miami Heat, New Orleans Hornets, Orlando Magic, Philadelphia 76ers, Phoenix Suns, Sacramento Kings, Seattle SuperSonics and Utah Jazz.

=== Canton ===
Logo used from 2011 to 2021 when the team was based in Canton.

It was announced on July 7, 2011, the Thunderbirds had been purchased by the Cleveland Cavaliers and were moving to Canton, Ohio, for the 2011–12 season. Alex Jensen was named the first head coach of the Charge on October 11. On October 13, the Canton Charge name, logo, colors, and court design were unveiled. On October 20, the team announced the first two players of the new team: Keith McLeod and Jamine Peterson. On October 25, the new uniforms were released. In the 2011 NBA D-League Draft, the Canton Charge selected Tyrell Biggs in the first round. In their first game as the Canton Charge, they were defeated by the 2010–11 champions Iowa Energy in an 100–82 game at home. Their first win came against the Texas Legends in their third game, which they won by 108–87.

Steve Hetzel was named head coach on September 11, 2013, for 2013–14.

=== Cleveland ===
The team's 10-year lease with the Canton Memorial Civic Center expired following the single-site and abbreviated 2020–21 season where the Charge had played in Orlando, Florida, within the G League bubble due to COVID-19 pandemic restrictions. The Cavaliers chose not to renew the lease in Canton and instead relocated the team to downtown Cleveland to play at Cleveland State University's Wolstein Center beginning with the 2021–22 season. The team was officially announced as the Cleveland Charge on July 26, 2021, with the team's logos and branding being largely unchanged other than the switch from Canton to Cleveland in the logo. In September 2021, Charge head coach Nate Reinking became an assistant with the Cavaliers and Cavs' assistant Dan Geriot took over as Charge head coach.

In September 2022, it was announced that Cavaliers assistant Mike Gerrity would take over as head coach of the Charge, trading places with Geriot.

On June 4, 2024, the Charge announced they would be moving their home games to the nearby Public Auditorium in downtown Cleveland, leaving the Wolstein Center after three seasons.

== Logos and uniforms ==
=== Huntsville Flight ===
The first logo of the team, when it still was the Huntsville Flight, consisted of a yellow basketball with a red fighter aircraft flying around the ball, and below it was written "Huntsville" in blue and "Flight" in yellow. Their colors were red, yellow, navy and white. The home uniform was white with "Huntsville" and the numbers written in red, near the arm and in the neck there were black and navy little lines. Their away uniform was similar, but it was red instead of white and the numbers in yellow.

=== Albuquerque/New Mexico Thunderbirds ===
Their logo as Albuquerque and New Mexico was the same, with just one difference, the name written below the logo. The logo consisted on a bird black head, with a basketball in its claw. Their colors were dark yellow, black, white and orange. As New Mexico, they removed the orange color and replaced with grey. Their home uniform was white, with "Thunderbirds" and the numbers written in orange, and black details on the side of the jersey. The away uniform was orange, with black details, and letters ("Albuquerque") in white. As New Mexico, it had a little change; the away uniform used "T-Birds" instead of "New Mexico".

=== Canton Charge ===
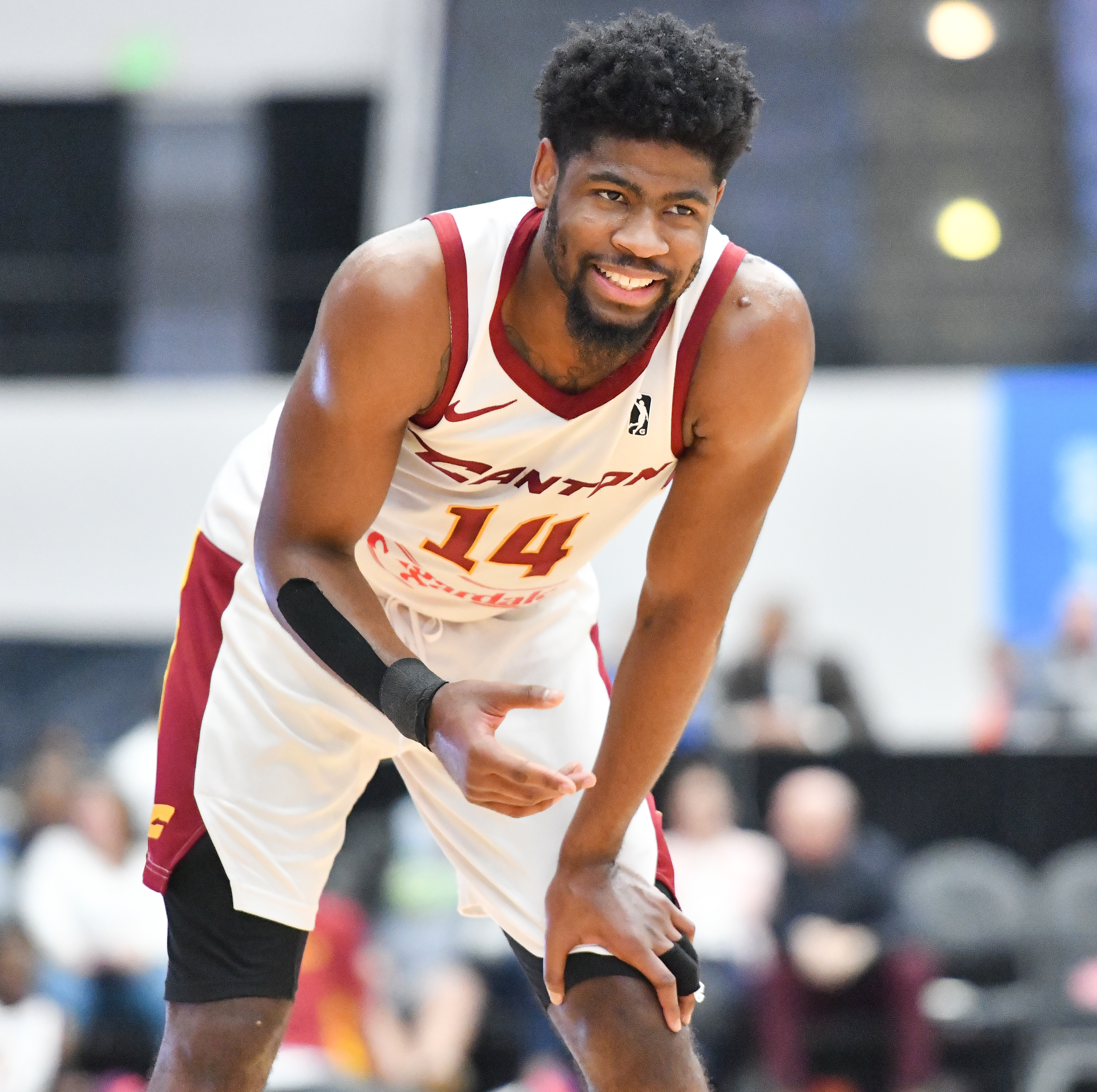
Malik Newman in 2020

Under the Cleveland Cavaliers ownership, the Charge adopted a similar style. The logo consists of a musketeer style soldier, with his sword pointing forward, and below him there is written "Canton Charge" in gold and white. The musketeer hat is wine and his clothes are gold. Their colors are wine, gold and white. They have an alternate logo, similar to the "C Sword Logo" from the Cavaliers, with a sword crossing a "C". Their original home uniform was gold with details, "Charge" and the numbers written in wine. The original away uniform was the same, only with the colors swapped. When Nike took over supplying uniforms for the NBA G League for the 2017–18 season, the Charge adopted a white uniform with wine letters and gold number accents while tweaking their wine uniform set to feature navy numbers with gold accents and lettering.

== Home arenas ==
- Von Braun Center (2001–2005)
- Tingley Coliseum (2005–2010)
- Santa Ana Star Center (2010–2011)
- Canton Memorial Civic Center (2011–2020) (Note: Played the 2020–21 NBA G League season in the G League bubble in Orlando, Florida due to the COVID-19 pandemic.)
- Wolstein Center (2021–2024)
- Public Auditorium (2024–present)

== Season-by-season ==
Season	Division	Regular season				Playoffs
Season	Division	Finish	Wins	Losses	Pct.	Playoffs
Huntsville Flight
2001–02		5th	26	30	.464	
2002–03		8th	22	28	.440	
2003–04		3rd	24	22	.522	Won Semifinals (Charleston) 108–100; Lost D-League Finals (Asheville) 106–108
2004–05		3rd	27	21	.563	Lost Semifinals (Asheville) 86–90
Albuquerque Thunderbirds
2005–06		2nd	26	22	.542	Won Semifinals (Florida) 80–71; Won D-League Finals (Fort Worth) 119–108
2006–07	Western	3rd	24	26	.480	Lost Semifinals (Colorado) 100–130
2007–08	Southwestern	4th	22	28	.440	
2008–09	Southwestern	3rd	24	26	.480	
2009–10	Western	7th	18	32	.360	
New Mexico Thunderbirds
2010–11	Western	9th	20	30	.400	
Canton Charge
2011–12	Eastern	4th	27	23	.540	Won First Round (Springfield) 2–1; Lost Semifinals (Austin) 1–2
2012–13	Eastern	1st	30	20	.600	Lost First Round (Tulsa) 1–2
2013–14	Eastern	2nd	28	22	.560	Lost First Round (Sioux Falls) 1–2
2014–15	Atlantic	2nd	31	19	.620	Won First Round (Sioux Falls) 2–1; Lost Semifinals (Fort Wayne) 0–2
2015–16	Central	2nd	31	19	.620	Won First Round (Maine) 2–0; Lost Semifinals (Sioux Falls) 0–2
2016–17	Central	3rd	29	21	.580	Lost First Round (Raptors) 0–2
2017–18	Central	4th	22	28	.440	
2018–19	Central	4th	22	28	.440	
2019–20	Central	2nd	29	14	.674	Season cancelled by COVID-19 pandemic
2020–21	—	14th	5	10	.333	
Cleveland Charge
2021–22	Eastern	15th	6	26	.188	
2022–23	Eastern	5th	18	14	.563	Won Quarterfinals (Maine) 113–100; Lost Semifinals (Long Island) 107–111
2023–24	Eastern	11th	15	19	.441	
2024–25	Eastern	11th	16	18	.471	
Regular season			542	556	.494	2001–present
Playoffs			13	18	.419	2001–present

== Current roster ==
Cleveland Charge roster
Players

Pos.	No.	Player	Height	Weight	DOB	From
F	34	Sy Chatman	6 ft 7 in (2.01 m)	220 lb (100 kg)	2000-07-08	Buffalo
F	13	Tristan Enaruna (TW)	6 ft 7 in (2.01 m)	220 lb (100 kg)	2001-06-26	Cleveland State
G	7	Ray Harrison	6 ft 4 in (1.93 m)	195 lb (88 kg)	2002-03-02	Grand Canyon
G	–	Ian Martinez	6 ft 3 in (1.91 m)	185 lb (84 kg)	2001-07-24	Utah State
G	12	Sean McNeil	6 ft 4 in (1.93 m)	205 lb (93 kg)	1998-08-17	Ohio State
F	22	Riley Minix (TW)	6 ft 7 in (2.01 m)	230 lb (104 kg)	2000-09-22	Morehead State
F	0	Micah Parrish	6 ft 6 in (1.98 m)	180 lb (82 kg)	2001-02-17	Ohio State
G	–	Kadary Richmond	6 ft 6 in (1.98 m)	205 lb (93 kg)	2001-08-25	St. John's
G/F	2	Jaxson Robinson	6 ft 7 in (2.01 m)	190 lb (86 kg)	2002-12-03	Kentucky
C	–	Ernest Udeh Jr. (TW)	6 ft 11 in (2.11 m)	266 lb (121 kg)	2004-01-08	Miami (FL)

Coaches
Head coach
- Chris Darnell
Assistant(s)
- Dan Vincent (Associate HC)
- Antoine Broxsie
- Sam Clancy Jr.
- Doron Perkins

Legend
- (DP) Unsigned draft pick
- (FA) Free agent
- (S) Suspended
- (P) Prospects
- (NBA) On assignment from NBA affiliate
- (TW) Two-way affiliate player
- Injured

Roster
Updated: July 1, 2026

== Head coaches ==
#	Head coach	Term	Regular season				Playoffs				Achievements
#	Head coach	Term	G	W	L	Win%	G	W	L	Win%	Achievements
1	Bob Thornton	2001–2002	56	26	30	.464	–	–	–	–	
2	Ralph Lewis	2002–2005	144	73	71	.507	3	1	2	.333	
3	Michael Cooper	2005–2007	98	50	48	.510	3	2	1	.667	NBA D-League champion (2006)
4	Jeff Ruland	2007–2008	50	22	28	.440	—	—	—	—	
5	John Coffino	2008–2010	100	42	58	.420	—	—	—	—	
6	Darvin Ham	2010–2011	50	20	30	.400	—	—	—	—	
7	Alex Jensen	2011–2013	100	57	43	.570	9	4	5	.444	
8	Steve Hetzel	2013–2014	50	28	22	.560	3	1	2	.333	
9	Jordi Fernández	2014–2016	100	62	38	.620	10	5	5	.500	
10	Nate Reinking	2016–2021	208	107	101	.514	2	0	2	.000	
11	Dan Geriot	2021–2022	32	6	26	.188	—	—	—	—	
12	Mike Gerrity	2022–2024	66	33	33	.500	2	1	1	.500	
13	Chris Darnell	2024–2025	34	16	18	.471	—	—	—	—	
14	Eli Kell-Abrams	2025–present	0	0	0	–	—	—	—	—	

== NBA affiliates ==
During the franchise's time in Huntsville, from 2001 to 2005, it did not have an official affiliation with any NBA team. Since 2005, the Charge franchise has been affiliated with 11 NBA teams for various amounts of time. Until the purchase by the Cleveland Cavaliers in 2011, the Charge franchise had affiliations with at least two NBA teams per season, with as many as four affiliations during the 2005–06 season.

- Sacramento Kings (2005–2006)
- Seattle SuperSonics (2005–2006)
- Utah Jazz (2005–2006)
- Phoenix Suns (2005–2008)
- Cleveland Cavaliers (2006–2007)
- Indiana Pacers (2006–2007)
- Philadelphia 76ers (2007–2008)
- Miami Heat (2008–2009)
- Dallas Mavericks (2008–2010)
- New Orleans Hornets (2009–2011)
- Orlando Magic (2010–2011)
- Cleveland Cavaliers (2011–present)

== Media ==
Charge games are heard online via the iHeart owned NEO Sports Radio.
