= 2016 Diamond Head Classic =

College basketball competition

- Season: 2016–17
- Teams: 8
- Finals site: Stan Sheriff Center; Honolulu, Hawaii
- Champions: San Diego State (1st title)
- Runner-up: San Francisco (1st title game)
- Semifinalists: Tulsa (1st semifinal); Illinois State (1st semifinal)
- Winning coach: Steve Fisher (1st title)
- MVP: Zylan Cheatham (San Diego State)

The 2016 Diamond Head Classic was a mid-season eight-team college basketball tournament that was played on December 22, 23, and 25 at the Stan Sheriff Center in Honolulu, Hawaii. It was the eighth annual Diamond Head Classic tournament and was part of the 2016-17 NCAA Division I men's basketball season. San Diego State defeated San Francisco to win the tournament championship. Zylan Cheatham was named the tournament's MVP.

== Bracket ==
5th Place Game; December 25
Stephen F. Austin	66
Utah	74
7th Place Game; December 25
Southern Miss	46
Hawaii	60

Consolation 2nd Round; December 23
Stephen F. Austin	67
Southern Miss	64
Utah	66
Hawai'i	52

First Round; December 22
Tulsa	74
Stephen F. Austin	51
San Diego State	66
Southern Miss	51
San Francisco	89
Utah	86
Illinois State	71
Hawai'i	45

Semifinals; December 23
Tulsa	63
San Diego State	82
San Francisco	66
Illinois State	58

Championship; December 25
San Diego State	62
San Francisco	48
3rd Place Game; December 25
Tulsa	56
Illinois State	68
