= 2012 Diamond Head Classic =

College basketball competition

- Season: 2012–13
- Teams: 8
- Finals site: Stan Sheriff Center; Honolulu, Hawaii
- Champions: Arizona (1st title)
- Runner-up: San Diego State (1st title game)
- Semifinalists: Indiana State (1st semifinal); Miami (1st semifinal)
- Winning coach: Sean Miller (1st title)
- MVP: Solomon Hill (Arizona)

The 2012 Diamond Head Classic was a mid-season eight-team college basketball tournament played on December 22, 23, and 25 at the Stan Sheriff Center in Honolulu, Hawaii. It was the fourth annual Diamond Head Classic tournament and was part of the 2012–13 NCAA Division I men's basketball season. No. 3-ranked Arizona defeated No. 17-ranked San Diego State to win the tournament championship. Solomon Hill was named the tournament's MVP.

== Bracket ==
* – Denotes overtime period

5th Place Game; December 25
Ole Miss	81
Hawai'i	66
7th Place Game; December 25
San Francisco	67
East Tennessee State	49

Consolation 2nd Round; December 23
Ole Miss	85
San Francisco	72
East Tennessee State	61
Hawai'i	84

First Round; December 22
Ole Miss	85
Indiana State	87*
18	San Diego State	80
San Francisco	58
4	Arizona	73
East Tennessee State	53
Miami (FL)	73
Hawaii	58

Semifinals; December 23
Indiana State	55
18	San Diego State	62
4	Arizona	69
Miami (FL)	50

Championship; December 25
17	San Diego State	67
3	Arizona	68
3rd Place Game; December 25
Indiana State	57*
Miami (FL)	55

== All-tournament team ==
Name	Position	College	Class
Solomon Hill	SF	Arizona	SR
Mark Lyons	G	Arizona	SR
Chase Tapley	G	San Diego State	SR
Murphy Halloway	PF	Ole Miss	SR
Jake Odum	G	Indiana State	JR
