= Zylan Cheatham =

American basketball player (born 1995)

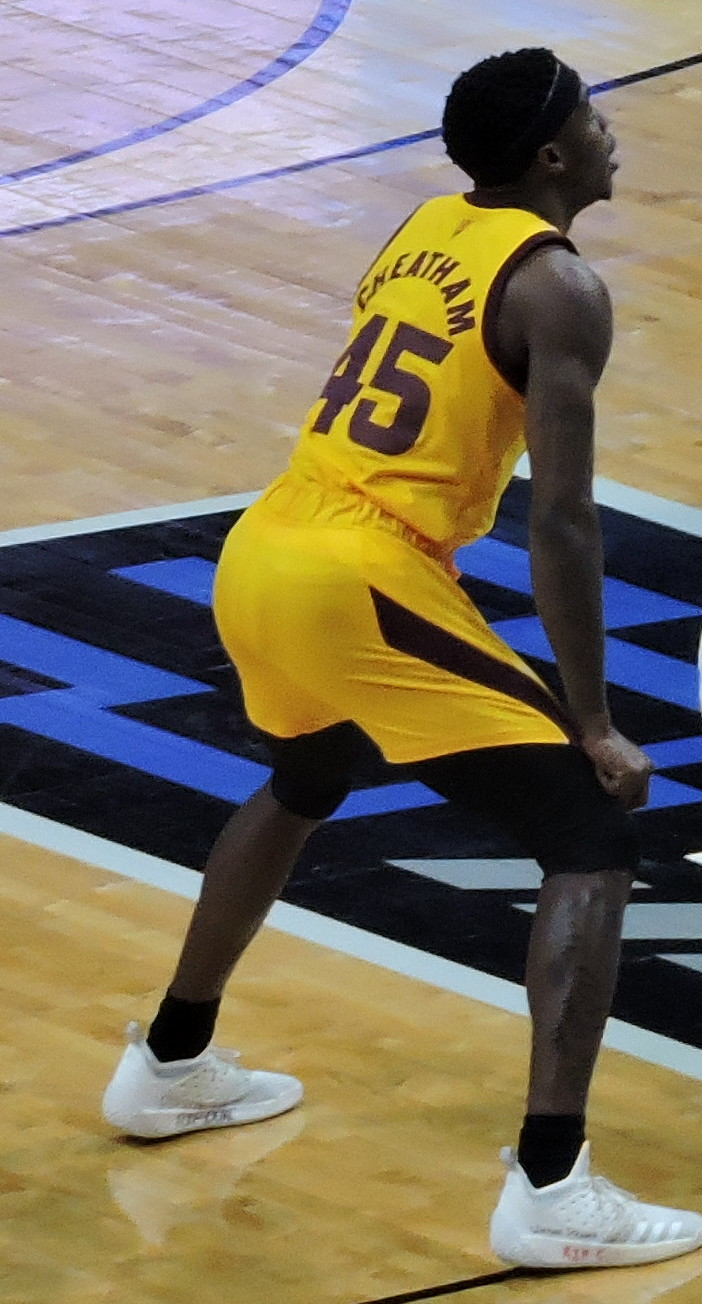
- Cheatham with the Arizona State Sun Devils in 2019

No. 45 – Adelaide 36ers
- Position: Power forward
- League: NBL

Personal information
- Born: November 17, 1995 (age 31) Phoenix, Arizona, U.S.
- Listed height: 203 cm (6 ft 8 in)
- Listed weight: 105 kg (231 lb)

Career information
- High school: St. Mary's (Phoenix, Arizona); Westwind Prep (Phoenix, Arizona); South Mountain (Phoenix, Arizona)
- College: San Diego State (2015–2017); Arizona State (2018–2019)
- NBA draft: 2019: undrafted
- Playing career: 2019–present

Career history
- 2019–2020: New Orleans Pelicans
- 2019–2020: →Erie BayHawks
- 2021: Iowa Wolves
- 2021–2023: Birmingham Squadron
- 2022: Utah Jazz
- 2022: →Salt Lake City Stars
- 2023: Bayern Munich
- 2023–2024: New Zealand Breakers
- 2024–2025: Nagoya Diamond Dolphins
- 2025–present: Adelaide 36ers

Career highlights
- All-NBL Second Team (2026); First-team All-Pac-12 (2019); Pac-12 All-Defensive Team (2019)
- Stats at NBA.com
- Stats at Basketball Reference
Medals
Men's basketball
Representing United States
FIBA AmeriCup
Bronze medal – third place	2022 Brazil

Zylan Anthony Cheatham (born November 17, 1995) is an American professional basketball player for the Adelaide 36ers of the National Basketball League (NBL). He played college basketball for the San Diego State Aztecs and the Arizona State Sun Devils.

== Early life ==
Cheatham grew up in South Phoenix and initially attended St. Mary's High School. He transferred to South Mountain High School after his freshman year, playing basketball there for two seasons before transferring to Westwind Preparatory Academy. Cheatham transferred back to South Mountain after learning the school did not meet the NCAA's academic standards and retook all of his junior courses simultaneously with his senior courseload in order to graduate on time. Ranked a consensus four star and top 100 recruit, Cheatham committed to San Diego State over offers from Arizona State, New Mexico, Georgetown, Miami and Utah.

== College career ==
=== San Diego State Aztecs (2015–2017) ===
Cheatham spent three seasons as a member of the San Diego State Aztecs, redshirting his freshman season after breaking the fifth metatarsal in his left foot. As a redshirt freshman in 2015–16, he averaged 7.9 points and 5.4 rebounds per game. In his redshirt sophomore season in 2016–17, Cheatham averaged 9.1 points and 6.3 rebounds and was named honorable mention All-Mountain West Conference. He was named the Most Outstanding Player of the 2016 Diamond Head Classic after averaging 15.7 points and 9.3 rebounds over four games as the Aztecs won the mid-season tournament. In April 2017, Cheatham announced that he would be leaving the program.

=== Arizona State Sun Devils (2018–2019) ===
Cheatham transferred to Arizona State University, citing a desire to play closer to home, but sat out the 2017–18 season due to NCAA transfer regulations. He joined the Sun Devils for the 2018–19 season. Cheatham decided to wear jersey number 45 in reference to Michael Jordan who wore it during his comeback. He averaged 12.2 points and a Pac-12 Conference-leading 10.3 rebounds per game. He was named first-team All-Pac-12 and earned All-Defensive team honors. He was named Pac-12 player of the week on December 3, 2018, following the second triple double in ASU history after recording 14 points, 11 rebounds and 10 assists in an 83–71 win over Texas.

== Professional career ==
=== New Orleans Pelicans (2019–2020) ===
Cheatham participated in the NBA G League Elite Camp in May 2019. After going undrafted in the 2019 NBA draft, he was immediately offered a two-way contract by the Oklahoma City Thunder but his deliberation meant that the team instead gave it to his Sun Devils teammate Luguentz Dort. Cheatham joined the New Orleans Pelicans for the 2019 NBA Summer League and later signed a two-way contract with the Pelicans on July 24, 2019. Cheatham made his NBA debut on November 16, 2019, in a 109–94 loss to the Miami Heat, recording two points, three rebounds and one assist in 14 minutes of play. He spent the majority of the 2019–20 season in the NBA G League with the Erie BayHawks.

=== Iowa Wolves (2021) ===
Cheatham was acquired by the Oklahoma City Thunder as part of a four-team trade on November 24, 2020, and his two-way contract was converted to a standard NBA contract. However, they waived him on December 2.

On December 18, 2020, Cheatham signed with the Minnesota Timberwolves, but was waived the next day. He subsequently played for the Iowa Wolves in the G League hub season between February and March 2021.

In August 2021, Cheatham played for the Denver Nuggets in the 2021 NBA Summer League.

=== Birmingham Squadron (2021–2022) ===
On September 24, 2021, Cheatham signed with the New Orleans Pelicans for training camp. He was waived on October 9 and subsequently joined the Birmingham Squadron for the 2021–22 NBA G League season.

On December 22, 2021, Cheatham signed a 10-day contract with the Miami Heat via a COVID-related hardship exception. Toward the end of his 10-day contract, with a huge outbreak on the team, Cheatham wound up testing positive for COVID as well. He did not appear in any games for the Heat during his tenure.

Cheatham re-joined the Squadron on January 3, 2022, but was removed from the team on January 6.

=== Utah Jazz (2022) ===
On January 12, 2022, Cheatham signed a 10-day contract with the Utah Jazz via another COVID-related hardship exception. He played five minutes for the Jazz that night against the Cleveland Cavaliers. It marked his only game for the Jazz. On January 19, he was assigned to the Jazz's G League affiliate, the Salt Lake City Stars. He played two games for the Stars.

=== Return to Birmingham (2022–2023) ===
On January 24, 2022, Cheatham returned to the Birmingham Squadron. On February 4, he signed a 10-day contract with the New Orleans Pelicans via another COVID-related hardship exception. However, he didn't play a game for the team. On February 14, Cheatham re-joined the Squadron once again.

Cheatham joined the Milwaukee Bucks for the 2022 NBA Summer League. He re-joined the Squadron for the 2022–23 NBA G League season, but later parted ways on February 28, 2023.

=== Bayern Munich (2023) ===
On March 6, 2023, Cheatham signed with Bayern Munich of the Basketball Bundesliga (BBL) and the EuroLeague for the rest of the 2022–23 season. In 19 BBL games, he averaged 8.8 points, 5.0 rebounds and 1.3 assists per game. He also averaged 11.5 points, 4.8 rebounds and 1.3 assists in six EuroLeague games.

=== New Zealand Breakers (2023–2024) ===
On July 18, 2023, Cheatham signed with the New Zealand Breakers of the National Basketball League (NBL) for the 2023–24 season. On October 27, 2023, he was ruled out for six to eight weeks with a fractured foot. He returned to active status with the Breakers in late December, 2023. He averaged 15 points and seven rebounds per game for the Breakers.

Cheatham played for the Brooklyn Nets in the 2024 NBA Summer League.

=== Nagoya Diamond Dolphins (2024–2025) ===
On August 1, 2024, Cheatham signed with Nagoya Diamond Dolphins of the B.League. He averaged over 12 points, seven rebounds and three assists per game.

=== Adelaide 36ers (2025–present) ===
On June 17, 2025, Cheatham signed with the Adelaide 36ers for the 2025–26 NBL season, returning to the league for a second stint. On December 21, 2025, he re-signed with the 36ers for two more seasons. He was named to the All-NBL Second Team. In game four of the Championship Series against the Sydney Kings, Cheatham recorded 23 points, nine assists, eight rebounds and two steals in a 92–91 win to level the series at 2–2.

On November 7, 2026, Cheatham recorded a triple-double with 21 points, 12 rebounds and 11 assists in a 106–78 win over the Illawarra Hawks.

== Personal life ==
Cheatham has 12 siblings. His brother, Wanyaa Stewart, was fatally shot on December 29, 2018, at a gas station in Tempe, Arizona.

Cheatham established a trucking business in Arizona in 2026.

== Career statistics ==
Legend
GP	Games played	GS	Games started	MPG	Minutes per game
FG%	Field goal percentage	3P%	3-point field goal percentage	FT%	Free throw percentage
RPG	Rebounds per game	APG	Assists per game	SPG	Steals per game
BPG	Blocks per game	PPG	Points per game	**Bold**	Career high

=== NBA ===
==== Regular season ====
Year	Team	GP	GS	MPG	FG%	3P%	FT%	RPG	APG	SPG	BPG	PPG
2019–20	New Orleans	**4**	0	**12.8**	**.667**	.000	–	**2.3**	**.8**	**.3**	**.3**	**3.0**
2021–22	Utah	1	0	5.0	.000	.000	–	.0	.0	.0	.0	.0
Career		5	0	11.2	.500	.000	–	1.8	.6	.2	.2	2.4

=== College ===
Year	Team	GP	GS	MPG	FG%	3P%	FT%	RPG	APG	SPG	BPG	PPG
2015–16	San Diego State	**38**	26	20.8	.528	.176	.716	5.4	.9	.6	.7	7.9
2016–17	San Diego State	31	22	23.4	.519	.167	**.756**	6.3	1.4	**1.1**	.6	9.1
2018–19	Arizona State	34	**34**	**32.4**	**.534**	**.440**	.618	**10.3**	**3.2**	.8	**.8**	**12.1**
Career		103	82	25.4	.528	.296	.687	7.3	1.8	.8	.7	9.7
