= Solomon Hill (basketball) =

American basketball player (born 1991)

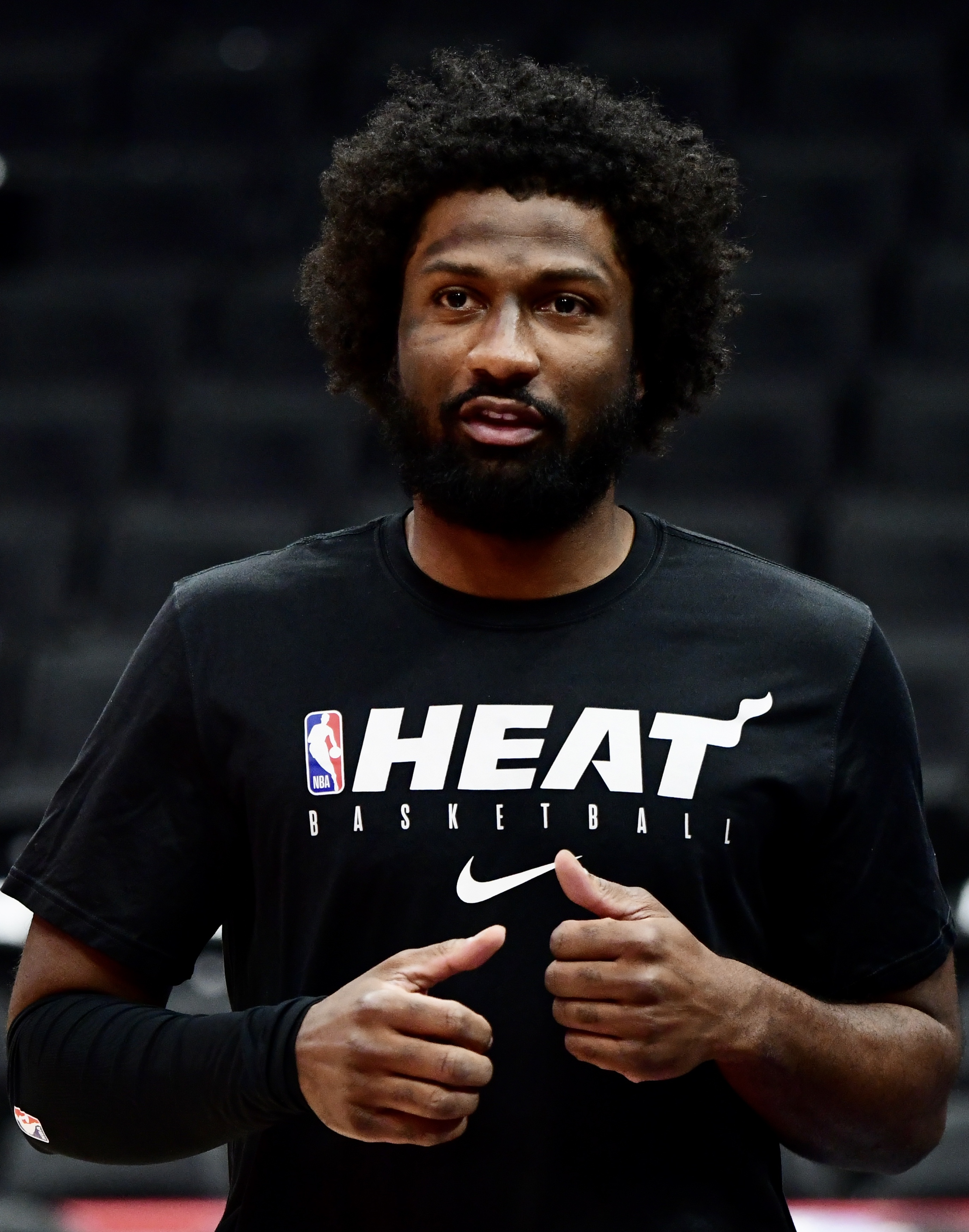
- Hill with the Miami Heat in 2020

Personal information
- Born: March 18, 1991 (age 35) Harvey, Illinois, U.S.
- Listed height: 6 ft 6 in (1.98 m)
- Listed weight: 226 lb (103 kg)

Career information
- High school: Fairfax (Los Angeles, California)
- College: Arizona (2009–2013)
- NBA draft: 2013: 1st round, 23rd overall pick
- Drafted by: Indiana Pacers
- Playing career: 2013–2022
- Position: Small forward / power forward
- Number: 9, 44, 18

Career history
- 2013–2016: Indiana Pacers
- 2013–2014: →Fort Wayne Mad Ants
- 2016–2019: New Orleans Pelicans
- 2019–2020: Memphis Grizzlies
- 2020: Miami Heat
- 2020–2022: Atlanta Hawks

Career highlights
- 2× First-team All-Pac-12 (2012, 2013)
- Stats at NBA.com
- Stats at Basketball Reference

Solomon Jamar Hill (born March 18, 1991) is an American former professional basketball player who played 9 seasons in the National Basketball Association (NBA). He played college basketball for the Arizona Wildcats.

== High school career ==
Hill attended Fairfax High School in Los Angeles. As a junior, he averaged 10.7 points and 8.7 rebounds per game. As a senior, he averaged 16.2 points, 11.7 rebounds and 5.1 assists per game. He finished his career as a two-time Los Angeles All-City selection and a third team all-state pick in 2009.

Considered a four-star recruit by Rivals.com, Hill was listed as the No. 3 small forward and the No. 27 player in the nation in 2009.

== College career ==
In his freshman season at Arizona, he was a steady contributor for the Wildcats both starting and off the bench. In 31 games (21 starts), he averaged 6.7 points, 4.4 rebounds and 1.7 assists in 25.3 minutes per game.

In his sophomore season, he was one of just three Wildcats to start every game. He was named to iBN Sports Las Vegas Invitational all-tournament team after averaging 11.0 points, 4.8 rebounds and 2.8 assists in event's four games. Head coach Sean Miller called Hill Arizona's most improved player in 2010–11. In 38 games (all starts), he averaged 8.0 points, 4.7 rebounds and 1.7 assists in 25.2 minutes per game.

In his junior season, he was named to the All-Pac-12 first team, the NABC All-District 20 first team and the Pacific Life Pac-12 All-Tournament team. He was also named Arizona's Most Outstanding Player by the coaching staff. In 35 games (all starts), he averaged 12.9 points, 7.7 rebounds, 2.6 assists and 1.0 steals in 32.4 minutes per game.

In his senior season, he was named to the All-Pac-12 first team and the NABC All-District 20 first team for the second straight year. He was also a USBWA all-District IX first team honoree and the winner of the Sapphire Award, given to Arizona's male athlete of the year. In 35 games (all starts), he averaged 13.4 points, 5.3 rebounds, 2.7 assists and 1.1 steals in 33.0 minutes per game. In December 2012, he was awarded the MVP of the 2012 Diamond Head Classic after averaging 12.0 points, 5.0 rebounds and 2.3 assists in the three games.

== Professional career ==
=== Indiana Pacers (2013–2016) ===
On June 27, 2013, Hill was selected with the 23rd overall pick by the Indiana Pacers in the 2013 NBA draft. On July 3, he signed his rookie scale contract with the Pacers and joined the team for the 2013 NBA Summer League. On December 29, 2013, he was assigned to the Fort Wayne Mad Ants. On January 4, 2014, he was recalled by the Pacers. On April 16, 2014, in the final regular season game, he played a season-high 28 minutes and pulled down a career-best five rebounds to go with five points on 2-for-6 shooting (1–2 3FG) in a win over the Orlando Magic. He appeared in 28 games during the 2013–14 regular season, posting averages of 1.7 points and 1.5 rebounds in 8.1 minutes per game.

An off-season right ankle injury forced Hill to miss the 2014 NBA Summer League. On October 9, 2014, the Pacers exercised their third-year team option on Hill's rookie scale contract, extending the contract through the 2015–16 season. On November 8, 2014, he scored a career-high 28 points in a 97–90 loss to the Washington Wizards. A week later, he recorded 21 points and a career-high 12 rebounds in a 99–90 win over the Chicago Bulls. Hill appeared in all 82 games for the Pacers in 2014–15, as the team missed the playoffs with a 38–44 win–loss record. Serving as the Pacers' starting small forward with Paul George out injured for most of the season, Hill managed 78 starts and finished with averages of 8.9 points, 3.8 rebounds and 2.2 assists in 29.0 minutes per game.

In July 2015, Hill re-joined the Pacers for the 2015 NBA Summer League. He shot poorly in three summer league games, going 18.2% from the field for a 4.7-point-per-game average. Hill's role and production decreased dramatically in 2015–16 thanks to the return of Paul George to full health. He scored in double figures just three times over the first five months of the season before scoring a then season-high 15 points on April 6, 2016, in a 123–109 win over the Eastern Conference-leading Cleveland Cavaliers. Four days later, he recorded his first double-double of the season with 13 points and 12 rebounds in a 129–103 win over the Brooklyn Nets. In the Pacers' regular season finale on April 13, Hill scored a season-high 25 points and went a career-best 7-of-11 from three-point range in a 97–92 win over the Milwaukee Bucks.

=== New Orleans Pelicans (2016–2019) ===
On July 21, 2016, Hill signed a four-year, $48 million contract with the New Orleans Pelicans. On February 15, 2017, he scored a then season-high 23 points in a 95–91 win over the Memphis Grizzlies. On March 17, Hill scored a career-high 30 points in a 128–112 win over the Houston Rockets. Hill was averaging just 6.5 points per game coming in, having spent most of the season focused on defense.

On August 27, 2017, Hill underwent surgery to repair a torn hamstring. He made his season debut on March 18, 2018, against the Boston Celtics. Hill played eight minutes and finished with one assist in a 108–89 win.

=== Memphis Grizzlies (2019–2020) ===
On July 6, 2019, Hill, the draft rights to De’Andre Hunter and Jordan Bone and a conditional 2023 second-round pick, were traded to the Atlanta Hawks for the draft rights to Jaxson Hayes, Nickeil Alexander-Walker and Marcos Louzada Silva, plus a conditional 2020 first-round pick. The next day, the Hawks traded him alongside Miles Plumlee to the Memphis Grizzlies for Chandler Parsons.

=== Miami Heat (2020) ===
On February 6, 2020, Hill was traded to the Miami Heat in a 3-team trade. The Heat reached the 2020 NBA Finals, before losing in 6 games to the Los Angeles Lakers.

=== Atlanta Hawks (2020–2022) ===
On November 25, 2020, Hill signed with the Atlanta Hawks.

On August 5, 2021, Hill re-signed with the Hawks. On December 5, he suffered a torn hamstring tendon in a 130–127 loss to the Charlotte Hornets. On December 8, it was confirmed to be a season-ending injury.

On January 13, 2022, the Hawks traded Hill, along with Cam Reddish, a 2025 second round draft pick and cash considerations, to the New York Knicks in exchange for Kevin Knox II and a protected future first round pick. On January 19, he was waived by the Knicks.

== Personal life ==
On November 26, 2023, Hill married his fiancée Brandi Byrd. Together, they have three children, with Hill having a daughter from a previous relationship with his ex-girlfriend Ashli Scott, who is currently married to NBA player Aaron Holiday. He also has a stepson, from Brandi's previous relationship.

== NBA career statistics ==
Legend
GP	Games played	GS	Games started	MPG	Minutes per game
FG%	Field goal percentage	3P%	3-point field goal percentage	FT%	Free throw percentage
RPG	Rebounds per game	APG	Assists per game	SPG	Steals per game
BPG	Blocks per game	PPG	Points per game	**Bold**	Career high

=== Regular season ===
Year	Team	GP	GS	MPG	FG%	3P%	FT%	RPG	APG	SPG	BPG	PPG
2013–14	Indiana	28	0	8.1	.425	.304	.857	1.5	.4	.2	.1	1.7
2014–15	Indiana	**82**	**78**	29.0	.396	.327	.824	**3.8**	**2.2**	.8	.2	**8.9**
2015–16	Indiana	59	3	14.7	**.447**	.324	.857	2.8	1.0	.6	.2	4.2
2016–17	New Orleans	80	71	**29.7**	.383	.348	.805	**3.8**	1.8	.9	.4	7.0
2017–18	New Orleans	12	1	15.6	.268	.190	.500	3.0	1.8	.6	.1	2.4
2018–19	New Orleans	44	15	20.0	.382	.317	.719	3.0	1.3	.5	.2	4.3
2019–20	Memphis	48	3	18.8	.412	**.381**	.684	3.0	2.0	.6	.1	5.7
2019–20	Miami	11	1	17.0	.311	.292	**.875**	1.9	.9	**1.1**	**.5**	4.5
2020–21	Atlanta	71	16	21.3	.359	.321	.761	3.0	1.1	.7	.2	4.5
2021–22	Atlanta	13	1	10.7	.150	.154	—	1.8	.9	.3	.2	.6
Career		448	189	21.5	.388	.331	.797	3.1	1.5	.7	.2	5.5

=== Playoffs ===
Year	Team	GP	GS	MPG	FG%	3P%	FT%	RPG	APG	SPG	BPG	PPG
2014	Indiana	1	0	1.0	—	—	—	.0	.0	.0	.0	.0
2016	Indiana	7	0	**28.3**	.452	**.579**	**.938**	**4.0**	**1.1**	**.3**	.0	**7.7**
2018	New Orleans	9	0	12.7	.360	.375	.900	1.9	.8	.1	**.1**	3.7
2020	Miami	7	0	6.0	**.556**	.333	—	1.0	.4	.1	.0	1.7
2021	Atlanta	**14**	**3**	10.4	.250	.167	.500	1.4	.1	.1	.0	1.2
Career		38	3	13.2	.382	.373	.867	1.9	.6	.2	.1	3.1
